= 2025 Bonn Open – Singles =

Singles
- 2025 Bonn Open

Final
- Champion: (Austria) Jurij Rodionov
- Runner-up: (Kazakhstan) Timofey Skatov
- Score: 3–6, 6–2, 6–4

Events
Singles	Doubles
- Bonn Open

Hugo Dellien was the defending champion but chose not to defend his title.

Jurij Rodionov won the title after defeating Timofey Skatov 3–6, 6–2, 6–4 in the final.

== Seeds ==
1. (Netherlands) Botic van de Zandschulp (withdrew)
2. (Belgium) Raphaël Collignon (semifinals)
3. (Denmark) Elmer Møller (second round)
4. (Lithuania) Vilius Gaubas (quarterfinals)
5. (United Kingdom) Jan Choinski (first round)
6. (Argentina) Federico Coria (second round)
7. (Austria) Jurij Rodionov (champion)
8. (Lebanon) Benjamin Hassan (first round)

== Draw ==
Key

- Q = Qualifier
- WC = Wild card
- LL = Lucky loser
- Alt = Alternate
- ITF = ITF entry
- PR = Protected ranking
- SR = Special ranking
- SE = Special exempt
- JE = Junior exempt
- JR = Junior Accelerator Programme entrant
- CO = College Accelerator Programme entrant
- NG = Next Gen Accelerator Program entrant
- w/o = Walkover
- r = Retired
- d = Defaulted

=== Finals ===
Semifinals
7	(Austria) Jurij Rodionov	1	6	6
NG	(Austria) Joel Schwärzler	6	2	4
(Kazakhstan) Timofey Skatov	6	4	7
2	(Belgium) Raphaël Collignon	4	6	5

Final
7	(Austria) Jurij Rodionov	3	6	6
(Kazakhstan) Timofey Skatov	6	2	4

=== Top half ===
First round
LL	(Germany) M Rosenkranz	6	7
(France) C Tabur	1	5
Q	(Brazil) P Boscardin Dias	2	1
(Argentina) L Midón	6	6
WC	(Germany) J Mackenzie	6	6
(Brazil) M Pucinelli de Almeida	0	4
Alt	(India) S Nagal	6^{2}	3
7	(Austria) J Rodionov	7^{7}	6
4	(Lithuania) V Gaubas	6	6
WC	(Germany) D Dedura	2	4
Q	(Czech Republic) M Krumich	6	6
(Germany) P Zahraj	4	4
NG	(Austria) J Schwärzler	7	6
(Germany) C Negritu	5	4
Q	(Italy) M Cecchinato	4	2
6	(Argentina) F Coria	6	6

Second round
LL	(Germany) M Rosenkranz	3	4
(Argentina) L Midón	6	6
WC	(Germany) J Mackenzie	3	4
7	(Austria) J Rodionov	6	6
4	(Lithuania) V Gaubas	4	6	6
Q	(Czech Republic) M Krumich	6	3	3
NG	(Austria) J Schwärzler	7^{7}	6
6	(Argentina) F Coria	6^{4}	1

Quarterfinals
(Argentina) L Midón	6^{2}	1
7	(Austria) J Rodionov	7^{7}	6
4	(Lithuania) V Gaubas	6	3	6^{4}
NG	(Austria) J Schwärzler	4	6	7^{7}

Semifinals
7	(Austria) J Rodionov	1	6	6
NG	(Austria) J Schwärzler	6	2	4

=== Bottom half ===
First round
8	(Lebanon) B Hassan	4	6	4
(Romania) FC Jianu	6	4	6
(Kazakhstan) T Skatov	6	7
(Kazakhstan) D Popko	2	5
WC	(Germany) N McDonald	6	4	4
Q	(Bulgaria) Y Milev	4	6	6
Q	(Argentina) G Villanueva	6^{4}	2
3	(Denmark) E Møller	7^{7}	6
5	(United Kingdom) J Choinski	3	0
(France) G Blancaneaux	6	6
(Brazil) JL Reis da Silva	6	5	6
SE	(Sweden) O Wallin	2	7	2
(Switzerland) J Kym	6	6
(Kazakhstan) D Yevseyev	2	4
Q	(Hungary) Péter Fajta	5	4
2	(Belgium) R Collignon	7	6

Second round
(Romania) FC Jianu	6^{0}	1
(Kazakhstan) T Skatov	7^{7}	6
Q	(Bulgaria) Y Milev	6	2	6
3	(Denmark) E Møller	2	6	2
(France) G Blancaneaux	4	2
(Brazil) JL Reis da Silva	6	6
(Switzerland) J Kym	2	5
2	(Belgium) R Collignon	6	7

Quarterfinals
(Kazakhstan) T Skatov	6	3
Q	(Bulgaria) Y Milev	0	0^{r}
(Brazil) JL Reis da Silva	3	5
2	(Belgium) R Collignon	6	7

Semifinals
(Kazakhstan) T Skatov	6	4	7
2	(Belgium) R Collignon	4	6	5
