= 2023 Layjet Open – Doubles =

Doubles
- 2023 Layjet Open

Final
- Champions: (Germany) Constantin Frantzen (Germany) Hendrik Jebens
- Runners-up: (Italy) Marco Bortolotti (Italy) Francesco Passaro
- Score: 6–1, 6–2

Events
Singles	Doubles
Layjet Open	· 2024 →

This was the first edition of the tournament.

Constantin Frantzen and Hendrik Jebens won the title after defeating Marco Bortolotti and Francesco Passaro 6–1, 6–2 in the final.

== Seeds ==
1. (Kazakhstan) Andrey Golubev / (Ukraine) Denys Molchanov (first round)
2. (Germany) Constantin Frantzen / (Germany) Hendrik Jebens (champions)
3. (France) Théo Arribagé / (France) Luca Sanchez (quarterfinals)
4. (Czech Republic) Roman Jebavý / (Czech Republic) Petr Nouza (first round)

== Draw ==
=== Key ===
- Q = Qualifier
- WC = Wild card
- LL = Lucky loser
- Alt = Alternate
- SE = Special exempt
- PR = Protected ranking
- ITF = ITF entry
- JE = Junior exempt
- w/o = Walkover
- r = Retired
- d = Defaulted
- SR = Special ranking

First round
1	(Kazakhstan) A Golubev (Ukraine) D Molchanov	6^{9}	7	[8]
(Spain) Í Cervantes (Spain) O Roca Batalla	7^{11}	5	[10]
I Liutarevich (Ukraine) V Manafov	6	7^{7}
Alt	(Italy) F Agamenone (Italy) R Brancaccio	4	6^{5}
3	(France) T Arribagé (France) L Sanchez	6	6
(Austria) N Oberleitner (Austria) P Oswald	4	4
(United States) H Reese (Poland) S Walków	4	2
(Italy) M Bortolotti (Italy) F Passaro	6	6
(Sweden) F Bergevi (Netherlands) M Veldheer	6	6
WC	(Austria) Syl Gaxherri (Austria) Jan Kobierski	4	1
(United Kingdom) J Choinski (Czech Republic) Z Kolář	7^{7}	6
4	(Czech Republic) R Jebavý (Czech Republic) P Nouza	6^{3}	4
(Poland) K Drzewiecki (Slovakia) I Zelenay	3	5
(Serbia) I Sabanov (Serbia) M Sabanov	6	7
WC	(Austria) D Pichler (Austria) Matthias Ujvary	4	4
2	(Germany) C Frantzen (Germany) H Jebens	6	6

Quarterfinals
(Spain) Í Cervantes (Spain) O Roca Batalla	4	6	[5]
I Liutarevich (Ukraine) V Manafov	6	3	[10]
3	(France) T Arribagé (France) L Sanchez	6^{4}	6^{1}
(Italy) M Bortolotti (Italy) F Passaro	7^{7}	7^{7}
(Sweden) F Bergevi (Netherlands) M Veldheer	6	6
(United Kingdom) J Choinski (Czech Republic) Z Kolář	3	0
(Serbia) I Sabanov (Serbia) M Sabanov	2	4
2	(Germany) C Frantzen (Germany) H Jebens	6	6

Semifinals
I Liutarevich (Ukraine) V Manafov	2	3
(Italy) M Bortolotti (Italy) F Passaro	6	6
(Sweden) F Bergevi (Netherlands) M Veldheer	6	6^{5}	[11]
2	(Germany) C Frantzen (Germany) H Jebens	4	7^{7}	[13]

Final
(Italy) M Bortolotti (Italy) F Passaro	1	2
2	(Germany) C Frantzen (Germany) H Jebens	6	6
