= 2024 Bad Waltersdorf Trophy – Doubles =

Doubles
- 2024 Bad Waltersdorf Trophy

Final
- Champions: (Czech Republic) Petr Nouza (Czech Republic) Patrik Rikl
- Runners-up: (Argentina) Guido Andreozzi (India) Sriram Balaji
- Score: 6–4, 4–6, [10–5]

Events
Singles	Doubles
← 2023 ·	Bad Waltersdorf Trophy	· 2025 →

Constantin Frantzen and Hendrik Jebens were the defending champions but chose not to defend their title.

Petr Nouza and Patrik Rikl won the title after defeating Guido Andreozzi and Sriram Balaji 6–4, 4–6, [10–5] in the final.

== Seeds ==
1. (Argentina) Guido Andreozzi / (India) Sriram Balaji (final)
2. (Romania) Victor Vlad Cornea / (Ukraine) Denys Molchanov (first round)
3. (Germany) Jakob Schnaitter / (Germany) Mark Wallner (semifinals)
4. (Czech Republic) Petr Nouza / (Czech Republic) Patrik Rikl (champions)

== Draw ==
=== Key ===
- Q = Qualifier
- WC = Wild card
- LL = Lucky loser
- Alt = Alternate
- ITF = ITF entry
- PR = Protected ranking
- SR = Special ranking
- SE = Special exempt
- JE = Junior exempt
- JR = Junior Accelerator Programme entrant
- CO = College Accelerator Programme entrant
- NG = Next Gen Accelerator Program entrant
- w/o = Walkover
- r = Retired
- d = Defaulted

=== Draw ===
First round
1	(Argentina) G Andreozzi (India) S Balaji	6	6
(Romania) A Jecan (Austria) D Pichler	3	4
(Italy) G Ricca (Italy) Augusto Virgili	6	6
(Colombia) DE Galán (Kazakhstan) D Popko	3	2
3	(Germany) J Schnaitter (Germany) M Wallner	6	7^{9}
PR	(Austria) M Neuchrist (Austria) S Weissborn	2	6^{7}
(Sweden) F Bergevi (Netherlands) M Veldheer	4	7	[10]
(Czech Republic) V Kopřiva (Czech Republic) M Vrbenský	6	5	[7]
WC	(Austria) N Oberleitner (Austria) J Schwärzler	6^{5}	6^{5}
(Germany) D Masur (Austria) L Miedler	7^{7}	7^{7}
Alt	(Croatia) M Dodig (Serbia) I Sabanov	1	3
4	(Czech Republic) P Nouza (Czech Republic) P Rikl	6	6
WC	(Austria) G Melzer (Austria) L Neumayer	4	7	[5]
(Spain) J Barranco Cosano (United States) N Moreno de Alboran	6	5	[10]
(Poland) K Drzewiecki (Poland) P Matuszewski	6	7^{7}
2	(Romania) V Cornea (Ukraine) D Molchanov	4	6^{3}

Quarterfinals
1	(Argentina) G Andreozzi (India) S Balaji	6	6
(Italy) G Ricca (Italy) A Virgili	1	2
3	(Germany) J Schnaitter (Germany) M Wallner	3	7^{7}	[10]
(Sweden) F Bergevi (Netherlands) M Veldheer	6	6^{4}	[8]
(Germany) D Masur (Austria) L Miedler	4	4
4	(Czech Republic) P Nouza (Czech Republic) P Rikl	6	6
(Spain) J Barranco Cosano (United States) N Moreno de Alboran	3	4
(Poland) K Drzewiecki (Poland) P Matuszewski	6	6

Semifinals
1	(Argentina) G Andreozzi (India) S Balaji	7^{7}	6
3	(Germany) J Schnaitter (Germany) M Wallner	6^{5}	1
4	(Czech Republic) P Nouza (Czech Republic) P Rikl	6	6
(Poland) K Drzewiecki (Poland) P Matuszewski	4	2

Final
1	(Argentina) G Andreozzi (India) S Balaji	4	6	[5]
4	(Czech Republic) P Nouza (Czech Republic) P Rikl	6	4	[10]
