= 2024 Bonn Open – Doubles =

Doubles
- 2024 Bonn Open

Final
- Champions: (France) Théo Arribagé (Brazil) Orlando Luz
- Runners-up: (India) Jeevan Nedunchezhiyan (India) Vijay Sundar Prashanth
- Score: 6–2, 6–4

Events
Singles	Doubles
Bonn Open	· 2025 →

This was the first edition of the tournament.

Théo Arribagé and Orlando Luz won the title after defeating Jeevan Nedunchezhiyan and Vijay Sundar Prashanth 6–2, 6–4 in the final.

== Seeds ==
1. (France) Théo Arribagé / (Brazil) Orlando Luz (champions)
2. (Germany) Jakob Schnaitter / (Germany) Mark Wallner (semifinals)
3. (Brazil) Fernando Romboli / (Brazil) Marcelo Zormann (first round)
4. (India) Jeevan Nedunchezhiyan / (India) Vijay Sundar Prashanth (final)

== Draw ==
=== Key ===
- Q = Qualifier
- WC = Wild card
- LL = Lucky loser
- Alt = Alternate
- ITF = ITF entry
- PR = Protected ranking
- SR = Special ranking
- SE = Special exempt
- JE = Junior exempt
- JR = Junior Accelerator Programme entrant
- CO = College Accelerator Programme entrant
- NG = Next Gen Accelerator Program entrant
- w/o = Walkover
- r = Retired
- d = Defaulted

=== Draw ===
First round
1	(France) T Arribagé (Brazil) O Luz	4	6	[10]
(Czech Republic) Jakub Nicod (Czech Republic) M Vrbenský	6	2	[6]
(Netherlands) D Pel (Netherlands) B Stevens	6	6
(France) L Sanchez (India) D Sharan	2	4
3	(Brazil) F Romboli (Brazil) M Zormann	3	3
(Spain) S Martos Gornés (Spain) D Vega Hernández	6	6
(United Kingdom) S Duncan (United States) H Reese	0^{d}
(France) G Blancaneaux (France) G Jacq	1
WC	(Germany) Christian Hansen (Germany) A Mies	7	3	[5]
(Serbia) I Sabanov (Serbia) M Sabanov	5	6	[10]
(Brazil) D Dutra da Silva (Brazil) M Pucinelli de Almeida	5	3
4	(India) J Nedunchezhiyan (India) VS Prashanth	7	6
(Sweden) F Bergevi (Netherlands) M Veldheer	3	7^{8}	[10]
WC	(Luxembourg) C Rodesch (Germany) P Zahraj	6	6^{6}	[6]
PR	(Croatia) Z Babić (Bulgaria) A Donski	3	3
2	(Germany) J Schnaitter (Germany) M Wallner	6	6

Quarterfinals
1	(France) T Arribagé (Brazil) O Luz	6	6
(Netherlands) D Pel (Netherlands) B Stevens	2	3
(Spain) S Martos Gornés (Spain) D Vega Hernández	3	1
(France) G Blancaneaux (France) G Jacq	6	6
(Serbia) I Sabanov (Serbia) M Sabanov	4	4
4	(India) J Nedunchezhiyan (India) VS Prashanth	6	6
(Sweden) F Bergevi (Netherlands) M Veldheer	4	6	[7]
2	(Germany) J Schnaitter (Germany) M Wallner	6	3	[10]

Semifinals
1	(France) T Arribagé (Brazil) O Luz	6	6
(France) G Blancaneaux (France) G Jacq	3	4
4	(India) J Nedunchezhiyan (India) VS Prashanth	7	7^{8}
2	(Germany) J Schnaitter (Germany) M Wallner	5	6^{6}

Final
1	(France) T Arribagé (Brazil) O Luz	6	6
4	(India) J Nedunchezhiyan (India) VS Prashanth	2	4
