= 2026 Bonn Open – Doubles =

Doubles
- 2026 Bonn Open

Final
- Champions: (India) Vijay Sundar Prashanth (India) Ramkumar Ramanathan
- Runners-up: (United Kingdom) Scott Duncan (Sweden) Adam Heinonen
- Score: 7–6^{(7–4)}, 6–3

Events
Singles	Doubles
- Bonn Open

Neil Oberleitner and Mick Veldheer were the defending champions but only Veldheer chose to defend his title, partnering Tim Rühl. They lost in the first round to Ignacio Carou and Federico Agustín Gómez.

Vijay Sundar Prashanth and Ramkumar Ramanathan won the title after defeating Scott Duncan and Adam Heinonen 7–6^{(7–4)}, 6–3 in the final.

== Seeds ==
1. (Germany) Hendrik Jebens / (Czech Republic) Matěj Vocel (first round)
2. (Germany) Tim Rühl / (Netherlands) Mick Veldheer (first round)
3. (Croatia) Admir Kalender / (Croatia) Nino Serdarušić (first round)
4. (India) Arjun Kadhe / (Poland) Szymon Kielan (quarterfinals)

== Draw ==
Key

- Q = Qualifier
- WC = Wild card
- LL = Lucky loser
- Alt = Alternate
- ITF = ITF entry
- PR = Protected ranking
- SR = Special ranking
- SE = Special exempt
- JE = Junior exempt
- JR = Junior Accelerator Programme entrant
- CO = College Accelerator Programme entrant
- NG = Next Gen Accelerator Program entrant
- w/o = Walkover
- r = Retired
- d = Defaulted

First round
1	(Germany) H Jebens (Czech Republic) M Vocel	6	6^{2}	[7]
(United Kingdom) F Bass (Netherlands) J Jans	4	7^{7}	[10]
WC	(Germany) Vincent Dullinger (Germany) Moritz Kudernatsch	6	6
(Serbia) I Sabanov (Serbia) M Sabanov	2	3
3	(Croatia) A Kalender (Croatia) N Serdarušić	6^{5}	3
(Venezuela) Juan José Bianchi (Spain) B Pujol Navarro	7^{7}	6
(Zimbabwe) CJ Lock (United States) Michael Zhu	6	3	[3]
(United Kingdom) S Duncan (Sweden) A Heinonen	3	6	[10]
(Germany) J Opitz (Germany) L Wessels	4	4
(India) VS Prashanth (India) R Ramanathan	6	6
WC	(Germany) Yannic Nittmann (Germany) Christopher Thies	4	4
4	(India) A Kadhe (Poland) S Kielan	6	6
(Netherlands) M Hermans (Morocco) Y Lalami	4	6^{5}
(Peru) A Merino (Italy) G Ricca	6	7^{7}
(Uruguay) I Carou (Argentina) FA Gómez	7^{14}	5	[10]
2	(Germany) T Rühl (Netherlands) M Veldheer	6^{12}	7	[8]

Quarterfinals
(United Kingdom) F Bass (Netherlands) J Jans	1	4
WC	(Germany) V Dullinger (Germany) M Kudernatsch	6	6
(Venezuela) JJ Bianchi (Spain) B Pujol Navarro	5	2
(United Kingdom) S Duncan (Sweden) A Heinonen	7	6
(India) VS Prashanth (India) R Ramanathan	6	6
4	(India) A Kadhe (Poland) S Kielan	3	4
(Peru) A Merino (Italy) G Ricca	2	6^{1}
(Uruguay) I Carou (Argentina) FA Gómez	6	7^{7}

Semifinals
WC	(Germany) V Dullinger (Germany) M Kudernatsch	5	5
(United Kingdom) S Duncan (Sweden) A Heinonen	7	7
(India) VS Prashanth (India) R Ramanathan	6	6
(Uruguay) I Carou (Argentina) FA Gómez	2	3

Final
(United Kingdom) S Duncan (Sweden) A Heinonen	6^{4}	3
(India) VS Prashanth (India) R Ramanathan	7^{7}	6
