= 2025 Bonn Open – Doubles =

Doubles
- 2025 Bonn Open

Final
- Champions: (Austria) Neil Oberleitner (Netherlands) Mick Veldheer
- Runners-up: (Germany) Tim Rühl (Germany) Patrick Zahraj
- Score: 4–6, 7–6^{(7–3)}, [12–10]

Events
Singles	Doubles
- Bonn Open

Théo Arribagé and Orlando Luz were the defending champions but only Arribagé chose to defend his title, partnering Luca Sanchez. They lost in the first round to Tim Rühl and Patrick Zahraj.

Neil Oberleitner and Mick Veldheer won the title after defeating Rühl and Zahraj 4–6, 7–6^{(7–3)}, [12–10] in the final.

== Seeds ==
1. (France) Théo Arribagé / (France) Luca Sanchez (first round)
2. (Denmark) Johannes Ingildsen / (India) Vijay Sundar Prashanth (first round)
3. (Peru) Alexander Merino / (Germany) Christoph Negritu (quarterfinals)
4. (Austria) Neil Oberleitner / (Netherlands) Mick Veldheer (champions)

== Draw ==
Key

- Q = Qualifier
- WC = Wild card
- LL = Lucky loser
- Alt = Alternate
- ITF = ITF entry
- PR = Protected ranking
- SR = Special ranking
- SE = Special exempt
- JE = Junior exempt
- JR = Junior Accelerator Programme entrant
- CO = College Accelerator Programme entrant
- NG = Next Gen Accelerator Program entrant
- w/o = Walkover
- r = Retired
- d = Defaulted

=== Draw ===
First round
1	(France) T Arribagé (France) L Sanchez	3	6^{2}
(Germany) T Rühl (Germany) P Zahraj	6	7^{7}
(Serbia) I Sabanov (Serbia) M Sabanov	6^{2}	3
WC	(Germany) N McDonald (Germany) M Schönhaus	7^{7}	6
3	(Peru) A Merino (Germany) C Negritu	6^{3}	6	[10]
WC	(Germany) J Opitz (Germany) Tom Zeuch	7^{7}	3	[6]
(Ukraine) Aleksandr Braynin (Austria) D Pichler	5	7^{7}	[6]
(South Korea) G Campaña Lee (United Kingdom) A Matusevich	7	6^{5}	[10]
(Argentina) L Midón (Argentina) G Villanueva	3	6	[10]
(Japan) K Uesugi (Japan) S Watanabe	6	3	[5]
(Netherlands) M Hermans (Australia) K Pearson	4	6^{4}
4	(Austria) N Oberleitner (Netherlands) M Veldheer	6	7^{7}
(Czech Republic) Jiří Barnat (Czech Republic) F Duda	7^{7}	4	[10]
(Romania) V Cornea (Spain) S Martos Gornés	6^{5}	6	[12]
(Kazakhstan) D Popko (Kazakhstan) D Yevseyev	6	6
2	(Denmark) J Ingildsen (India) VS Prashanth	4	4

Quarterfinals
(Germany) T Rühl (Germany) P Zahraj	6	6
WC	(Germany) N McDonald (Germany) M Schönhaus	3	1
3	(Peru) A Merino (Germany) C Negritu	6^{4}	6	[5]
(South Korea) G Campaña Lee (United Kingdom) A Matusevich	7^{7}	3	[10]
(Argentina) L Midón (Argentina) G Villanueva	4	3
4	(Austria) N Oberleitner (Netherlands) M Veldheer	6	6
(Romania) V Cornea (Spain) S Martos Gornés	w/o
(Kazakhstan) D Popko (Kazakhstan) D Yevseyev

Semifinals
(Germany) T Rühl (Germany) P Zahraj	6^{7}	6	[10]
(South Korea) G Campaña Lee (United Kingdom) A Matusevich	7^{9}	1	[7]
4	(Austria) N Oberleitner (Netherlands) M Veldheer	6	7^{7}
(Romania) V Cornea (Spain) S Martos Gornés	1	6^{3}

Final
(Germany) T Rühl (Germany) P Zahraj	6	6^{3}	[10]
4	(Austria) N Oberleitner (Netherlands) M Veldheer	4	7^{7}	[12]
