= 2024 Bonn Open – Singles =

Singles
- 2024 Bonn Open

Final
- Champion: (Bolivia) Hugo Dellien
- Runner-up: (Germany) Maximilian Marterer
- Score: 7–6^{(7–2)}, 6–0

Events
Singles	Doubles
Bonn Open	· 2025 →

This was the first edition of the tournament.

Hugo Dellien won the title after defeating Maximilian Marterer 7–6^{(7–2)}, 6–0 in the final.

== Seeds ==
1. (Bosnia and Herzegovina) Damir Džumhur (first round)
2. (Germany) Maximilian Marterer (final)
3. (Bolivia) Hugo Dellien (champion)
4. (Spain) Oriol Roca Batalla (second round)
5. (Lebanon) Benjamin Hassan (semifinals)
6. (Germany) Henri Squire (quarterfinals)
7. (France) Calvin Hemery (quarterfinals)
8. (Germany) Rudolf Molleker (first round)

== Draw ==
=== Key ===
- Q = Qualifier
- WC = Wild card
- LL = Lucky loser
- Alt = Alternate
- SE = Special exempt
- PR = Protected ranking
- ITF = ITF entry
- JE = Junior exempt
- w/o = Walkover
- r = Retired
- d = Defaulted
- SR = Special ranking

=== Finals ===
Semifinals
(Spain) Martín Landaluce	5	3
3	(Bolivia) Hugo Dellien	7	6
5	(Lebanon) Benjamin Hassan	3	6^{3}
2	(Germany) Maximilian Marterer	6	7^{7}

Final
3	(Bolivia) Hugo Dellien	7^{7}	6
2	(Germany) Maximilian Marterer	6^{2}	0

=== Top half ===
First round
1	(Bosnia and Herzegovina) D Džumhur	5	3
(France) G Blancaneaux	7	6
Q	(Argentina) JB Torres	2	3
(United Kingdom) J Choinski	6	6
(Argentina) GA Olivieri	1	4
Q	(Italy) M Cecchinato	6	6
(Spain) M Landaluce	2	7^{7}	6
8	(Germany) R Molleker	6	6^{2}	1
3	(Bolivia) H Dellien	6	6
WC	(Germany) MH Rehberg	3	1
Q	(Czech Republic) Jakub Nicod	6^{9}	3
(France) C Tabur	7^{11}	6
(Romania) FC Jianu	6	6
LL	(Brazil) D Dutra da Silva	4	2
(Germany) D Masur	3	4
7	(France) C Hemery	6	6

Second round
(France) G Blancaneaux	6^{5}	6	3
(United Kingdom) J Choinski	7^{7}	3	6
Q	(Italy) M Cecchinato	4	1
(Spain) M Landaluce	6	6
3	(Bolivia) H Dellien	6	6
(France) C Tabur	1	3
(Romania) FC Jianu	4	7^{7}	3
7	(France) C Hemery	6	6^{4}	6

Quarterfinals
(United Kingdom) J Choinski	2	3
(Spain) M Landaluce	6	6
3	(Bolivia) H Dellien	6	6
7	(France) C Hemery	0	1

Semifinals
(Spain) M Landaluce	5	3
3	(Bolivia) H Dellien	7	6

=== Bottom half ===
First round
5	(Lebanon) B Hassan	6	7^{11}
(Luxembourg) C Rodesch	2	6^{9}
(Czech Republic) M Vrbenský	1	7^{7}	2
(Italy) S Travaglia	6	6^{5}	6
Alt	(France) T Lamasine	3	3
(Czech Republic) D Svrčina	6	6
Alt	(Germany) S Fanselow	0	1
4	(Spain) O Roca Batalla	6	6
6	(Germany) H Squire	6	6
Q	(Bulgaria) Y Milev	3	4
Q	(Slovakia) M Kližan	7^{7}	6
WC	(Germany) J Engel	6^{4}	3
(Lebanon) H Habib	7^{7}	6
Q	(Belgium) R Collignon	6^{3}	2
WC	(Germany) M Topo	2	5
2	(Germany) M Marterer	6	7

Second round
5	(Lebanon) B Hassan	6	6
(Italy) S Travaglia	3	3
(Czech Republic) D Svrčina	3	6	6
4	(Spain) O Roca Batalla	6	1	4
6	(Germany) H Squire	6	7^{11}
Q	(Slovakia) M Kližan	4	6^{9}
(Lebanon) H Habib	6	6^{3}	4
2	(Germany) M Marterer	4	7^{7}	6

Quarterfinals
5	(Lebanon) B Hassan	6	6
(Czech Republic) D Svrčina	0	4
6	(Germany) H Squire	4	3
2	(Germany) M Marterer	6	6

Semifinals
5	(Lebanon) B Hassan	3	6^{3}
2	(Germany) M Marterer	6	7^{7}
