= 2024 Bad Waltersdorf Trophy – Singles =

Singles
- 2024 Bad Waltersdorf Trophy

Final
- Champion: (Spain) Jaume Munar
- Runner-up: (Brazil) Thiago Seyboth Wild
- Score: 6–2, 6–1

Events
Singles	Doubles
- Bad Waltersdorf Trophy

Andrea Pellegrino was the defending champion but withdrew from the tournament before his first round match.

Jaume Munar won the title after defeating Thiago Seyboth Wild 6–2, 6–1 in the final.

== Seeds ==
1. (Spain) Jaume Munar (champion)
2. (Brazil) Thiago Monteiro (quarterfinals, retired)
3. (Argentina) Federico Coria (first round)
4. (Brazil) Thiago Seyboth Wild (final)
5. (Italy) Francesco Passaro (first round)
6. (Serbia) Laslo Djere (semifinals)
7. (Spain) Albert Ramos Viñolas (second round)
8. (Colombia) Daniel Elahi Galán (second round)

== Draw ==
Key

- Q = Qualifier
- WC = Wild card
- LL = Lucky loser
- Alt = Alternate
- ITF = ITF entry
- PR = Protected ranking
- SR = Special ranking
- SE = Special exempt
- JE = Junior exempt
- JR = Junior Accelerator Programme entrant
- CO = College Accelerator Programme entrant
- NG = Next Gen Accelerator Program entrant
- w/o = Walkover
- r = Retired
- d = Defaulted

=== Finals ===
Semifinals
1	(Spain) Jaume Munar	5	7^{12}	6
(United States) Nicolas Moreno de Alboran	7	6^{10}	1
4	(Brazil) Thiago Seyboth Wild	6	6
6	(Serbia) Laslo Djere	1	4

Final
1	(Spain) Jaume Munar	6	6
4	(Brazil) Thiago Seyboth Wild	2	1

=== Top half ===
First round
1	(Spain) J Munar	5	6	6
(Chile) T Barrios Vera	7	4	2
LL	(Switzerland) K Feldbausch	4	3
Alt	(Austria) D Novak	6	6
Q	(Turkey) C İlkel	7	4	6^{1}
(Croatia) M Dodig	5	6	7^{7}
LL	(Croatia) N Serdarušić	7^{7}	1	4
8	(Colombia) DE Galán	6^{4}	6	6
3	(Argentina) F Coria	4	6^{5}
Q	(Switzerland) M Brunold	6	7^{7}
Q	(Austria) D Pichler	7^{7}	6^{6}	4
Alt	(France) G Blancaneaux	6^{4}	7^{8}	6
(United States) N Moreno de Alboran	6	6
Alt	(Italy) F Arnaboldi	1	3
(Germany) H Squire	6	7^{8}
5	(Italy) F Passaro	4	6^{6}

Second round
1	(Spain) J Munar	6	6
Alt	(Austria) D Novak	3	2
(Croatia) M Dodig	7^{7}	6
8	(Colombia) DE Galán	6^{5}	3
Q	(Switzerland) M Brunold	5	4
Alt	(France) G Blancaneaux	7	6
(United States) N Moreno de Alboran	6	6
(Germany) H Squire	3	4

Quarterfinals
1	(Spain) J Munar	6	6
(Croatia) M Dodig	1	4
Alt	(France) G Blancaneaux	2	1
(United States) N Moreno de Alboran	6	6

Semifinals
1	(Spain) J Munar	5	7^{12}	6
(United States) N Moreno de Alboran	7	6^{10}	1

=== Bottom half ===
First round
7	(Spain) A Ramos Viñolas	6	6
WC	(Austria) L Neumayer	2	2
Alt	(Spain) C Taberner	6	6
WC	(Austria) J Schwärzler	4	3
Q	(Czech Republic) M Vrbenský	5	6	6
(Spain) J Barranco Cosano	7	3	1
(Kazakhstan) D Popko	6^{5}	6	2
4	(Brazil) T Seyboth Wild	7^{7}	2	6
6	(Serbia) L Djere	7^{7}	0	6
Q	(United Kingdom) J Choinski	6^{4}	6	4
Q	(Germany) T Handel	6^{5}	5
Alt	(Austria) F Misolic	7^{7}	7
(Czech Republic) V Kopřiva	3	6	4
WC	(Austria) S Kopp	6	1	6
(Lithuania) V Gaubas	5	3
2	(Brazil) T Monteiro	7	6

Second round
7	(Spain) A Ramos Viñolas	1	7^{11}	1
Alt	(Spain) C Taberner	6	6^{9}	6
Q	(Czech Republic) M Vrbenský	1	4
4	(Brazil) T Seyboth Wild	6	6
6	(Serbia) L Djere	6	7^{7}
Alt	(Austria) F Misolic	4	6^{3}
WC	(Austria) S Kopp	1	6^{4}
2	(Brazil) T Monteiro	6	7^{7}

Quarterfinals
Alt	(Spain) C Taberner	2	2
4	(Brazil) T Seyboth Wild	6	6
6	(Serbia) L Djere	6	4
2	(Brazil) T Monteiro	4	1^{r}

Semifinals
4	(Brazil) T Seyboth Wild	6	6
6	(Serbia) L Djere	1	4
