= 2024 Bonn Open =

- Date: 5 – 11 August
- Edition: 1st
- Surface: Clay
- Location: Bonn, Germany

Champions

Singles
- (Bolivia) Hugo Dellien

Doubles
- (France) Théo Arribagé / (Brazil) Orlando Luz
Bonn Open	· 2025 →

The 2024 Bonn Open was a professional tennis tournament played on clay courts. It was the 1st edition of the tournament which was part of the 2024 ATP Challenger Tour. It took place in Bonn, Germany between 5 and 11 August 2024.

== Singles main-draw entrants ==
=== Seeds ===
Country	Player	Rank^{1}	Seed
BIH	Damir Džumhur	104	1
GER	Maximilian Marterer	116	2
BOL	Hugo Dellien	140	3
ESP	Oriol Roca Batalla	159	4
LIB	Benjamin Hassan	170	5
GER	Henri Squire	184	6
FRA	Calvin Hemery	195	7
GER	Rudolf Molleker	212	8

- ^{1} Rankings are as of 29 July 2024.

=== Other entrants ===
The following players received wildcards into the singles main draw:

- (Germany) Justin Engel
- (Germany) Max Hans Rehberg
- (Germany) Marko Topo

The following players received entry into the singles main draw as alternates:

- (Germany) Sebastian Fanselow
- (France) Tristan Lamasine

The following players received entry from the qualifying draw:

- (Italy) Marco Cecchinato
- (Belgium) Raphaël Collignon
- (Slovakia) Martin Kližan
- (Bulgaria) Yanaki Milev
- (Czech Republic) Jakub Nicod
- (Argentina) Juan Bautista Torres

The following player received entry as a lucky loser:

- (Brazil) Daniel Dutra da Silva

== Champions ==
=== Singles ===
- (Bolivia) Hugo Dellien def. (Germany) Maximilian Marterer 7–6^{(7–2)}, 6–0.

=== Doubles ===
- (France) Théo Arribagé / (Brazil) Orlando Luz def. (India) Jeevan Nedunchezhiyan / (India) Vijay Sundar Prashanth 6–2, 6–4.
