= 2025 Layjet Open – Doubles =

Doubles
- 2025 Layjet Open

Final
- Champions: (Austria) David Pichler (Croatia) Nino Serdarušić
- Runners-up: (Czech Republic) Jiří Barnat (Czech Republic) Filip Duda
- Score: 6–3, 6–3

Events
Singles	Doubles
- Layjet Open

Petr Nouza and Patrik Rikl were the defending champions but chose not to defend their title.

David Pichler and Nino Serdarušić won the title after defeating Jiří Barnat and Filip Duda 6–3, 6–3 in the final.

== Seeds ==
1. (Brazil) Marcelo Demoliner / (Brazil) Orlando Luz (first round)
2. (Poland) Karol Drzewiecki / (Poland) Piotr Matuszewski (first round)
3. (Spain) Íñigo Cervantes / (Netherlands) Mick Veldheer (first round)
4. (Romania) Victor Vlad Cornea / (Poland) Szymon Walków (first round)

== Draw ==
Key

- Q = Qualifier
- WC = Wild card
- LL = Lucky loser
- Alt = Alternate
- ITF = ITF entry
- PR = Protected ranking
- SR = Special ranking
- SE = Special exempt
- JE = Junior exempt
- JR = Junior Accelerator Programme entrant
- CO = College Accelerator Programme entrant
- NG = Next Gen Accelerator Program entrant
- w/o = Walkover
- r = Retired
- d = Defaulted

=== Draw ===
First round
1	(Brazil) M Demoliner (Brazil) O Luz	6^{5}	3
(Austria) N Oberleitner (Austria) J Schwärzler	7^{7}	6
WC	(Austria) N Hipfl (Austria) S Kopp	6^{3}	1
(Serbia) I Sabanov (Serbia) M Sabanov	7^{7}	6
4	(Romania) V Cornea (Poland) S Walków	4	6	[6]
(Austria) D Pichler (Croatia) N Serdarušić	6	3	[10]
(Czech Republic) Z Kolář (Ukraine) D Molchanov	2	6^{4}
(Spain) M Mansilla Díez (Spain) B Pujol Navarro	6	7^{7}
(Italy) G Ricca (Spain) D Vega Hernández	6^{6}	5
(Czech Republic) Jiří Barnat (Czech Republic) F Duda	7^{8}	7
(Poland) S Kielan (Ukraine) V Sachko	4	6	[10]
3	(Spain) Í Cervantes (Netherlands) M Veldheer	6	4	[7]
(Czech Republic) A Paulson (Czech Republic) M Vrbenský	6	7^{7}
WC	(Austria) Syl Gaxherri (Austria) Alex Huszar	1	6^{3}
(Bulgaria) A Donski (Serbia) S Latinović	6	7^{7}
2	(Poland) K Drzewiecki (Poland) P Matuszewski	2	6^{3}

Quarterfinals
(Austria) N Oberleitner (Austria) J Schwärzler	7^{9}	3	[13]
(Serbia) I Sabanov (Serbia) M Sabanov	6^{7}	6	[15]
(Austria) D Pichler (Croatia) N Serdarušić	6	6
(Spain) M Mansilla Díez (Spain) B Pujol Navarro	1	4
(Czech Republic) J Barnat (Czech Republic) F Duda	6	7^{7}
(Poland) S Kielan (Ukraine) V Sachko	3	6^{5}
(Czech Republic) A Paulson (Czech Republic) M Vrbenský	4	5
(Bulgaria) A Donski (Serbia) S Latinović	6	7

Semifinals
(Serbia) I Sabanov (Serbia) M Sabanov	4	6^{4}
(Austria) D Pichler (Croatia) N Serdarušić	6	7^{7}
(Czech Republic) J Barnat (Czech Republic) F Duda	6	6
(Bulgaria) A Donski (Serbia) S Latinović	4	4

Final
(Austria) D Pichler (Croatia) N Serdarušić	6	6
(Czech Republic) J Barnat (Czech Republic) F Duda	3	3
