= 2026 Bonn Open =

- Date: 27 July – 2 August
- Edition: 3rd
- Surface: Clay
- Location: Bonn, Germany

Champions

Singles
- (United Kingdom) Jan Choinski

Doubles
- (India) Vijay Sundar Prashanth / (India) Ramkumar Ramanathan
- Bonn Open

The 2026 Bonn Open was a professional tennis tournament played on clay courts. It was the third edition of the tournament which was part of the 2026 ATP Challenger Tour. It took place in Bonn, Germany between 27 July and 2 August 2026.

== Champions ==
=== Singles ===
- (United Kingdom) Jan Choinski def. (Germany) Jamie Mackenzie 6–3, 6–2.

=== Doubles ===
- (India) Vijay Sundar Prashanth / (India) Ramkumar Ramanathan def. (United Kingdom) Scott Duncan / (Sweden) Adam Heinonen 7–6^{(7–4)}, 6–3.

== Singles main-draw entrants ==
=== Seeds ===
Country	Player	Rank	Seed
GBR	Jan Choinski	90	1
ITA	Stefano Travaglia	143	2
AUT	Jurij Rodionov	145	3
FRA	Clément Tabur	161	4
ESP	Roberto Carballés Baena	177	5
GER	Tom Gentzsch	189	6
DEN	Elmer Møller	190	7
ARG	Federico Agustín Gómez	191	8

- ^{1} Rankings are as of 20 July 2026.

=== Other entrants ===
The following players received wildcards into the singles main draw:

- (Germany) Jamie Mackenzie
- (Germany) Niels McDonald
- (Germany) Max Hans Rehberg

The following player received entry into the singles main draw as a special exempt:

- (France) Matteo Martineau

The following player received entry into the singles main draw through the College Accelerator programme:

- (Sweden) Max Dahlin

The following player received entry into the singles main draw through the Junior Accelerator programme:

- (Germany) Max Schönhaus

The following player received entry into the singles main draw through the Next Gen Accelerator programme:

- (Germany) ~~Diego Dedura~~

The following player received entry into the singles main draw as an alternate:

- (Brazil) Pedro Boscardin Dias

The following players received entry from the qualifying draw:

- (Colombia) Daniel Elahi Galán
- (Italy) Samuele Pieri
- (Brazil) Matheus Pucinelli de Almeida
- (Greece) Dimitris Sakellaridis
- (Germany) Marko Topo
- (Sweden) Olle Wallin

The following player received entry as a lucky loser:

- (Switzerland) Johan Nikles
