= 2023 Layjet Open – Singles =

Singles
- 2023 Layjet Open

Final
- Champion: (Italy) Andrea Pellegrino
- Runner-up: (Austria) Dennis Novak
- Score: 1–6, 7–6^{(7–5)}, 6–3

Events
Singles	Doubles
- Layjet Open

This was the first edition of the tournament.

Andrea Pellegrino won the title after defeating Dennis Novak 1–6, 7–6^{(7–5)}, 6–3 in the final.

== Seeds ==
1. (Spain) Roberto Carballés Baena (first round)
2. (Spain) Bernabé Zapata Miralles (withdrew)
3. (Spain) Jaume Munar (first round)
4. (Spain) Albert Ramos Viñolas (semifinals)
5. (Austria) Jurij Rodionov (first round)
6. (Spain) Pedro Martínez (first round)
7. (France) Benoît Paire (first round)
8. (Kazakhstan) Timofey Skatov (first round)

== Draw ==
Key

- Q = Qualifier
- WC = Wild card
- LL = Lucky loser
- Alt = Alternate
- ITF = ITF entry
- PR = Protected ranking
- SR = Special ranking
- SE = Special exempt
- JE = Junior exempt
- JR = Junior Accelerator Programme entrant
- CO = College Accelerator Programme entrant
- NG = Next Gen Accelerator Program entrant
- w/o = Walkover
- r = Retired
- d = Defaulted

=== Finals ===
Semifinals
(Italy) Andrea Pellegrino	6	6
4	(Spain) Albert Ramos Viñolas	2	3
(Austria) Dennis Novak	3	7^{9}	6
(Czech Republic) Vít Kopřiva	6	6^{7}	2

Final
(Italy) Andrea Pellegrino	1	7^{7}	6
(Austria) Dennis Novak	6	6^{5}	3

=== Top half ===
First round
1	(Spain) R Carballés Baena	5	6	6^{6}
(Slovakia) J Kovalík	7	3	7^{8}
Q	(Turkey) E Kırkın	7	2	6
(Austria) L Neumayer	5	6	1
LL	(Poland) M Kaśnikowski	6	5	1
(Italy) F Passaro	0	7	6
(Italy) A Pellegrino	6^{6}	6	6
5	(Austria) J Rodionov	7^{8}	3	2
4	(Spain) A Ramos Viñolas	4	6	6
WC	(Austria) J Schwärzler	6	1	3
(Italy) F Agamenone	5	7^{7}	3
Q	(Czech Republic) P Nouza	7	6^{3}	6
Q	(Germany) Timo Stodder	1	7	3
(Austria) F Misolic	6	5	6
WC	(Italy) F Fognini	6	4	6
7	(France) B Paire	2	6	1

Second round
(Slovakia) J Kovalík	6	6
Q	(Turkey) E Kırkın	1	2
(Italy) F Passaro	6	2	2
(Italy) A Pellegrino	2	6	6
4	(Spain) A Ramos Viñolas	6	6
Q	(Czech Republic) P Nouza	2	3
(Austria) F Misolic	6	1
WC	(Italy) F Fognini	3	0^{r}

Quarterfinals
(Slovakia) J Kovalík	6^{4}	5
(Italy) A Pellegrino	7^{7}	7
4	(Spain) A Ramos Viñolas	6	4	6
(Austria) F Misolic	2	6	3

Semifinals
(Italy) A Pellegrino	6	6
4	(Spain) A Ramos Viñolas	2	3

=== Bottom half ===
First round
6	(Spain) P Martínez	5	4
(United Kingdom) J Choinski	7	6
WC	(Austria) Sebastian Sorger	1	5
(Czech Republic) Z Kolář	6	7
(Austria) D Novak	6	6
LL	(Austria) S Kopp	3	3
(Ukraine) V Sachko	7^{7}	7^{7}
3	(Spain) J Munar	6^{3}	6^{1}
8	(Kazakhstan) T Skatov	6^{1}	3
(Germany) R Molleker	7^{7}	6
(Czech Republic) V Kopřiva	6	3	7^{7}
Q	(Italy) Andrea Picchione	4	6	6^{5}
(Italy) R Brancaccio	7^{7}	5	6
Q	(Germany) H Squire	6^{4}	7	2
(Bulgaria) A Andreev	5	4
Q	(Germany) M Möller	7	6

Second round
(United Kingdom) J Choinski	2	6	7
(Czech Republic) Z Kolář	6	3	5
(Austria) D Novak	6	6
(Ukraine) V Sachko	4	4
(Germany) R Molleker	6	4	0^{r}
(Czech Republic) V Kopřiva	1	6	4
(Italy) R Brancaccio	3	3
Q	(Germany) M Möller	6	6

Quarterfinals
(United Kingdom) J Choinski	1	0
(Austria) D Novak	6	6
(Czech Republic) V Kopřiva	6	7
Q	(Germany) M Möller	4	5

Semifinals
(Austria) D Novak	3	7^{9}	6
(Czech Republic) V Kopřiva	6	6^{7}	2
