= 2026 Zagreb Open =

- Date: 11–16 May
- Edition: 21st (men); 7th (women)
- Category: ATP Challenger Tour; ITF Women's World Tennis Tour
- Surface: Clay
- Location: Zagreb, Croatia

Champions

Men's singles
- (United Kingdom) Jan Choinski

Women's singles
- Erika Andreeva

Men's doubles
- (United Kingdom) Finn Bass / (Bulgaria) Anthony Genov

Women's doubles
- (Switzerland) Naïma Karamoko / (Croatia) Tara Würth
- Zagreb Open

The 2026 Zagreb Open was a professional tennis tournament played on outdoor clay courts. It was part of the 2026 ATP Challenger Tour and the 2026 ITF Women's World Tennis Tour. It took place in Zagreb, Croatia between 11 and 16 May 2026.

== Men's singles main-draw entrants ==
=== Seeds ===
Country	Player	Rank^{1}	Seed
GBR	Jan Choinski	122	1
JPN	Shintaro Mochizuki	130	2
DEN	Elmer Møller	153	3
GBR	Arthur Fery	157	4
HUN	Zsombor Piros	163	5
LUX	Chris Rodesch	166	6
DEN	August Holmgren	167	7
ITA	Marco Cecchinato	182	8

- Rankings are as of 4 May 2026.

=== Other entrants ===
The following players received wildcards into the singles main draw:

- (Croatia) Emanuel Ivanišević
- (Croatia) Mili Poljičak
- (Croatia) Josip Šimundža

The following player received entry into the singles main draw through the College Accelerator programme:

- (United States) Stefan Dostanic

The following player received entry into the singles main draw through the Junior Accelerator programme:

- (France) Yannick Theodor Alexandrescou

The following player received entry into the singles main draw through the Next Gen Accelerator programme:

- (Germany) Diego Dedura

The following players received entry into the singles main draw as alternates:

- (Ecuador) Álvaro Guillén Meza
- (Brazil) Thiago Seyboth Wild
- (United Kingdom) Harry Wendelken

The following players received entry from the qualifying draw:

- (Bosnia and Herzegovina) Nerman Fatić
- (Czech Republic) Jonáš Forejtek
- (Colombia) Daniel Elahi Galán
- (Australia) Thanasi Kokkinakis
- (Brazil) Thiago Monteiro
- (Switzerland) Dominic Stricker

== Champions ==
=== Men's singles ===
- (United Kingdom) Jan Choinski def. (Hungary) Zsombor Piros 7–6^{(7–5)}, 7–6^{(7–2)}.

=== Women's singles ===
- Erika Andreeva def. (Germany) Ella Seidel 6–3, 3–6, 6–3.

=== Men's doubles ===
- (United Kingdom) Finn Bass / (Bulgaria) Anthony Genov def. (United States) George Goldhoff / (Denmark) Johannes Ingildsen 4–6, 6–3, [10–8].

=== Women's doubles ===
- (Switzerland) Naïma Karamoko / (Croatia) Tara Würth def. (Romania) Briana Szabó / (Latvia) Beatrise Zeltiņa 3–6, 7–6^{(7–4)}, [10–5].
