= 2026 Bonn Open – Singles =

Singles
- 2026 Bonn Open

Final
- Champion: (United Kingdom) Jan Choinski
- Runner-up: (Germany) Jamie Mackenzie
- Score: 6–3, 6–2

Events
Singles	Doubles
- Bonn Open

Jurij Rodionov was the defending champion but lost in the quarterfinals to Jamie Mackenzie.

Jan Choinski won the title after defeating Mackenzie 6–3, 6–2 in the final.

== Seeds ==
1. (United Kingdom) Jan Choinski (champion)
2. (Italy) Stefano Travaglia (first round)
3. (Austria) Jurij Rodionov (quarterfinals)
4. (France) Clément Tabur (first round)
5. (Spain) Roberto Carballés Baena (second round)
6. (Germany) Tom Gentzsch (second round)
7. (Denmark) Elmer Møller (second round)
8. (Argentina) Federico Agustín Gómez (semifinals)

== Draw ==
Key

- Q = Qualifier
- WC = Wild card
- LL = Lucky loser
- Alt = Alternate
- ITF = ITF entry
- PR = Protected ranking
- SR = Special ranking
- SE = Special exempt
- JE = Junior exempt
- JR = Junior Accelerator Programme entrant
- CO = College Accelerator Programme entrant
- NG = Next Gen Accelerator Program entrant
- w/o = Walkover
- r = Retired
- d = Defaulted

=== Finals ===
Semifinals
1	(United Kingdom) Jan Choinski	6	6
8	(Argentina) Federico Agustín Gómez	4	2
WC	(Germany) Jamie Mackenzie	6	5	6
CO	(Sweden) Max Dahlin	4	7	4

Final
1	(United Kingdom) Jan Choinski	6	6
WC	(Germany) Jamie Mackenzie	3	2

=== Top half ===
First round
1	(United Kingdom) J Choinski	6	6
(Italy) F Passaro	3	4
LL	(Switzerland) J Nikles	6	3	3
(Argentina) A Barrena	3	6	6
Q	(Sweden) O Wallin	3	6	6
(Italy) L Giustino	6	3	2
(Netherlands) M Houkes	4	6	2
5	(Spain) R Carballés Baena	6	3	6
4	(France) C Tabur	6	4	4
(Germany) H Squire	4	6	6
(Netherlands) G den Ouden	3	3
Q	(Brazil) M Pucinelli de Almeida	6	6
(Belgium) GA Bailly	2	3
Q	(Italy) S Pieri	6	6
JR	(Germany) M Schönhaus	4	2
8	(Argentina) FA Gómez	6	6

Second round
1	(United Kingdom) J Choinski	6	6
(Argentina) A Barrena	3	2
Q	(Sweden) O Wallin	6	1	6
5	(Spain) R Carballés Baena	3	6	1
(Germany) H Squire	2	6^{5}
Q	(Brazil) M Pucinelli de Almeida	6	7^{7}
Q	(Italy) S Pieri	3	3
8	(Argentina) FA Gómez	6	6

Quarterfinals
1	(United Kingdom) J Choinski	6	7
Q	(Sweden) O Wallin	4	5
Q	(Brazil) M Pucinelli de Almeida	6^{4}	6	5
8	(Argentina) FA Gómez	7^{7}	2	7

Semifinals
1	(United Kingdom) J Choinski	6	6
8	(Argentina) FA Gómez	4	2

=== Bottom half ===
First round
7	(Denmark) E Møller	6	7
Q	(Germany) M Topo	4	5
(Belgium) B Gadamauri	6^{4}	2
WC	(Germany) J Mackenzie	7^{7}	6
Q	(Greece) D Sakellaridis	3	6^{4}
WC	(Germany) N McDonald	6	7^{7}
Alt	(Brazil) P Boscardin Dias	3	4
3	(Austria) J Rodionov	6	6
6	(Germany) T Gentzsch	6	6
(Brazil) JL Reis da Silva	3	3
CO	(Sweden) M Dahlin	6	7
SE	(France) M Martineau	4	5
P Kotov	4	4
Q	(Colombia) DE Galán	6	6
WC	(Germany) MH Rehberg	6	6
2	(Italy) S Travaglia	3	1

Second round
7	(Denmark) E Møller	1	6	3
WC	(Germany) J Mackenzie	6	1	6
WC	(Germany) N McDonald	6^{3}	3
3	(Austria) J Rodionov	7^{7}	6
6	(Germany) T Gentzsch	4	6	6^{8}
CO	(Sweden) M Dahlin	6	3	7^{10}
Q	(Colombia) DE Galán	4	7^{7}	7^{7}
WC	(Germany) MH Rehberg	6	6^{3}	6^{4}

Quarterfinals
WC	(Germany) J Mackenzie	7^{7}	6
3	(Austria) J Rodionov	6^{5}	4
CO	(Sweden) M Dahlin	7^{7}	3	7
Q	(Colombia) DE Galán	6^{2}	6	5

Semifinals
WC	(Germany) J Mackenzie	6	5	6
CO	(Sweden) M Dahlin	4	7	4
