= 2025 Layjet Open – Singles =

Singles
- 2025 Layjet Open

Final
- Champion: (United Kingdom) Jan Choinski
- Runner-up: (Czech Republic) Vít Kopřiva
- Score: 7–5, 6–4

Events
Singles	Doubles
- Layjet Open

Jaume Munar was the defending champion but chose not to defend his title.

Jan Choinski won the title after defeating Vít Kopřiva 7–5, 6–4 in the final.

== Seeds ==
1. (Spain) Pedro Martínez (first round, retired)
2. (Czech Republic) Vít Kopřiva (final)
3. (Spain) Roberto Carballés Baena (semifinals)
4. (Argentina) Thiago Agustín Tirante (first round)
5. (Spain) Pablo Carreño Busta (quarterfinals)
6. (Serbia) Dušan Lajović (first round)
7. (Colombia) Daniel Elahi Galán (first round)
8. (Argentina) Román Andrés Burruchaga (quarterfinals)

== Draw ==
Key

- Q = Qualifier
- WC = Wild card
- LL = Lucky loser
- Alt = Alternate
- ITF = ITF entry
- PR = Protected ranking
- SR = Special ranking
- SE = Special exempt
- JE = Junior exempt
- JR = Junior Accelerator Programme entrant
- CO = College Accelerator Programme entrant
- NG = Next Gen Accelerator Program entrant
- w/o = Walkover
- r = Retired
- d = Defaulted

=== Finals ===
Semifinals
(United Kingdom) Jan Choinski	6	6
Q	(Czech Republic) Zdeněk Kolář	4	2
3	(Spain) Roberto Carballés Baena	1	3
2	(Czech Republic) Vít Kopřiva	6	6

Final
(United Kingdom) Jan Choinski	7	6
2	(Czech Republic) Vít Kopřiva	5	4

=== Top half ===
First round
1	(Spain) P Martínez	1	0^{r}
Q	(Germany) M Topo	6	3
(United Kingdom) J Choinski	6	6
(Ukraine) V Sachko	1	4
(France) L Pavlovic	6	6^{6}	6
Q	(Czech Republic) Tadeáš Paroulek	4	7^{8}	3
(Italy) F Passaro	6	5	6
6	(Serbia) D Lajović	1	7	4
4	(Argentina) TA Tirante	6	1	4
LL	(Italy) G Piraino	2	6	6
Alt	(Croatia) M Dodig	4	4
Q	(Czech Republic) Z Kolář	6	6
(Brazil) T Monteiro	6	6
(Spain) D Mérida	3	1
(Lithuania) V Gaubas	2	1
8	(Argentina) RA Burruchaga	6	6

Second round
Q	(Germany) M Topo	6	1	6^{6}
(United Kingdom) J Choinski	2	6	7^{8}
(France) L Pavlovic	2	2
(Italy) F Passaro	6	6
LL	(Italy) G Piraino	1	6	2
Q	(Czech Republic) Z Kolář	6	1	6
(Brazil) T Monteiro	4	7^{7}	0
8	(Argentina) RA Burruchaga	6	6^{2}	6

Quarterfinals
(United Kingdom) J Choinski	7^{7}	6
(Italy) F Passaro	6^{4}	3
Q	(Czech Republic) Z Kolář	6	6
8	(Argentina) RA Burruchaga	0	4

Semifinals
(United Kingdom) J Choinski	6	6
Q	(Czech Republic) Z Kolář	4	2

=== Bottom half ===
First round
7	(Colombia) DE Galán	4	2
Alt	(Argentina) F Díaz Acosta	6	6
LL	(Germany) M Möller	3	6	6^{5}
Q	(Czech Republic) H Bartoň	6	3	7^{7}
Alt	(Sweden) E Ymer	4	4
WC	(Austria) S Kopp	6	6
Q	(Austria) D Novak	3	1
3	(Spain) R Carballés Baena	6	6
5	(Spain) P Carreño Busta	7	4	6
(Austria) L Neumayer	5	6	3
WC	(Austria) Sebastian Sorger	6	5	6
Q	(Slovakia) J Kovalík	4	7	4
LL	(Germany) C-M Stebe	5	1
WC	(Austria) J Schwärzler	7	6
(Brazil) T Seyboth Wild	3	6	6^{1}
2	(Czech Republic) V Kopřiva	6	3	7^{7}

Second round
Alt	(Argentina) F Díaz Acosta	4	7	4
Q	(Czech Republic) H Bartoň	6	5	6
WC	(Austria) S Kopp	1	6	2
3	(Spain) R Carballés Baena	6	3	6
5	(Spain) P Carreño Busta	7	6
WC	(Austria) S Sorger	5	4
WC	(Austria) J Schwärzler	4	2
2	(Czech Republic) V Kopřiva	6	6

Quarterfinals
Q	(Czech Republic) H Bartoň	3	4
3	(Spain) R Carballés Baena	6	6
5	(Spain) P Carreño Busta	2	6	1
2	(Czech Republic) V Kopřiva	6	0	6

Semifinals
3	(Spain) R Carballés Baena	1	3
2	(Czech Republic) V Kopřiva	6	6
