= 2025 Dutch Open =

- Date: 14 – 20 July
- Surface: Clay
- Location: Bunschoten, Netherlands

Champions

Singles
- (United Kingdom) Jan Choinski

Doubles
- (Belgium) Michael Geerts / (Germany) Tim Rühl
- Dutch Open

The 2025 Dutch Open was a professional tennis tournament played on clay courts. It was the sixth edition of the Challenger tournament which was part of the 2025 ATP Challenger Tour. It took place in Bunschoten, Netherlands between 14 and 20 July 2025.

== Singles main draw entrants ==
=== Seeds ===
Country	Player	Rank^{1}	Seed
HUN	Zsombor Piros	160	1
NED	Guy den Ouden	174	2
LBN	Benjamin Hassan	193	3
FRA	Titouan Droguet	194	4
GBR	Jan Choinski	200	5
BEL	Gauthier Onclin	206	6
FRA	Clément Tabur	215	7
BUL	Dimitar Kuzmanov	226	8

- ^{1} Rankings are as of 30 June 2025.

=== Other entrants ===
The following players received wildcards into the singles main draw:

- (Netherlands) Manvydas Balciunas
- (Netherlands) Abel Forger
- (Netherlands) Mees Röttgering

The following player received entry into the singles main draw through the Next Gen Accelerator programme:

- (Croatia) Matej Dodig

The following players received entry into the singles main draw as alternates:

- (Netherlands) ~~Gijs Brouwer~~
- (Belgium) Michael Geerts
- (Brazil) Matheus Pucinelli de Almeida

The following players received entry from the qualifying draw:

- (Italy) Federico Bondioli
- (Argentina) Nicolás Kicker
- (Czech Republic) Martin Krumich
- (United Kingdom) Anton Matusevich
- (Germany) Marvin Möller
- (Netherlands) Stijn Slump

The following players received entry as lucky losers:

- (Brazil) Daniel Dutra da Silva
- (Netherlands) Jelle Sels

== Champions ==
=== Singles ===
- (United Kingdom) Jan Choinski def. (Belgium) Kimmer Coppejans 6–4, 3–6, 6–3.

=== Doubles ===
- (Belgium) Michael Geerts / (Germany) Tim Rühl def. (Netherlands) Mats Hermans / (Netherlands) Mick Veldheer 7–5, 7–6^{(7–4)}.
