= 2024 Bad Waltersdorf Trophy =

- Date: 16–22 September
- Edition: 2nd
- Surface: Clay
- Location: Bad Waltersdorf, Austria

Champions

Singles
- (Spain) Jaume Munar

Doubles
- (Czech Republic) Petr Nouza / (Czech Republic) Patrik Rikl
- Bad Waltersdorf Trophy

The 2024 Bad Waltersdorf Trophy was a professional tennis tournament played on clay courts. It was the second edition of the tournament which was part of the 2024 ATP Challenger Tour. It took place in Bad Waltersdorf, Austria between 16 and 22 September 2024.

== Singles main-draw entrants ==
=== Seeds ===
Country	Player	Rank^{1}	Seed
ESP	Jaume Munar	74	1
BRA	Thiago Monteiro	76	2
ARG	Federico Coria	79	3
BRA	Thiago Seyboth Wild	98	4
ITA	Francesco Passaro	106	5
SRB	Laslo Djere	121	6
ESP	Albert Ramos Viñolas	126	7
COL	Daniel Elahi Galán	130	8

^{1} Rankings are as of 9 September 2024.

=== Other entrants ===
The following players received wildcards into the singles main draw:

- (Austria) Sandro Kopp
- (Austria) Lukas Neumayer
- (Austria) Joel Schwärzler

The following players received entry into the singles main draw as alternates:

- (Italy) Federico Arnaboldi
- (France) Geoffrey Blancaneaux
- (Austria) Filip Misolic
- (Austria) Dennis Novak
- (Spain) Carlos Taberner

The following players received entry from the qualifying draw:

- (Switzerland) Mika Brunold
- (United Kingdom) Jan Choinski
- (Germany) Tim Handel
- (Turkey) Cem İlkel
- (Austria) David Pichler
- (Czech Republic) Michael Vrbenský

The following players received entry as lucky losers:

- (Switzerland) Kilian Feldbausch
- (Croatia) Nino Serdarušić

== Champions ==
=== Singles ===
- (Spain) Jaume Munar def. (Brazil) Thiago Seyboth Wild 6–2, 6–1.

=== Doubles ===
- (Czech Republic) Petr Nouza / (Czech Republic) Patrik Rikl def. (Argentina) Guido Andreozzi / (India) Sriram Balaji 6–4, 4–6, [10–5].
