= 2025 Dutch Open – Doubles =

Doubles
- 2025 Dutch Open

Final
- Champions: (Belgium) Michael Geerts (Germany) Tim Rühl
- Runners-up: (Netherlands) Mats Hermans (Netherlands) Mick Veldheer
- Score: 7–5, 7–6^{(7–4)}

Events
Singles	Doubles
- Dutch Open

Marcelo Demoliner and Guillermo Durán were the defending champions but chose not to defend their title.

Michael Geerts and Tim Rühl won the title after defeating Mats Hermans and Mick Veldheer 7–5, 7–6^{(7–4)} in the final.

== Seeds ==
1. (Romania) Victor Vlad Cornea / (Spain) Sergio Martos Gornés (quarterfinals)
2. (Czech Republic) Filip Duda / (Austria) Neil Oberleitner (quarterfinals)
3. (Netherlands) Mats Hermans / (Netherlands) Mick Veldheer (final)
4. (South Korea) Nam Ji-sung / (Japan) Seita Watanabe (quarterfinals)

== Draw ==
Key

- Q = Qualifier
- WC = Wild card
- LL = Lucky loser
- Alt = Alternate
- ITF = ITF entry
- PR = Protected ranking
- SR = Special ranking
- SE = Special exempt
- JE = Junior exempt
- JR = Junior Accelerator Programme entrant
- CO = College Accelerator Programme entrant
- NG = Next Gen Accelerator Program entrant
- w/o = Walkover
- r = Retired
- d = Defaulted

=== Draw ===
First round
1	(Romania) V Cornea (Spain) S Martos Gornés	6	6
(Zimbabwe) CJ Lock (Netherlands) T Loof	3	2
(Belgium) M Geerts (Germany) T Rühl	6	3	[10]
(France) G Blancaneaux (France) C Tabur	0	6	[5]
4	(South Korea) J-s Nam (Japan) S Watanabe	6	6
Alt	(Argentina) A Barrena (Argentina) N Kicker	1	4
(Brazil) D Dutra da Silva (Brazil) M Pucinelli de Almeida	6	6
PR	(Uruguay) I Carou (Netherlands) M Vervoort	2	3
WC	(Netherlands) Manvydas Balciunas (Netherlands) Abel Forger	4	6	[2]
(Spain) M Mansilla Díez (Spain) B Pujol Navarro	6	2	[10]
(Finland) Patrick Kaukovalta (Finland) P Niklas-Salminen	5	5
3	(Netherlands) M Hermans (Netherlands) M Veldheer	7	7
Alt	(Netherlands) Dax Donders (Netherlands) S Klaassen	4	6	[5]
(Poland) S Kielan (Poland) F Pieczonka	6	3	[10]
(Brazil) L Britto (Peru) A Huertas del Pino	3	7^{7}	[7]
2	(Czech Republic) F Duda (Austria) N Oberleitner	6	6^{5}	[10]

Quarterfinals
1	(Romania) V Cornea (Spain) S Martos Gornés	4	6^{4}
(Belgium) M Geerts (Germany) T Rühl	6	7^{7}
4	(South Korea) J-s Nam (Japan) S Watanabe	3	6	[7]
(Brazil) D Dutra da Silva (Brazil) M Pucinelli de Almeida	6	3	[10]
(Spain) M Mansilla Díez (Spain) B Pujol Navarro	3	5
3	(Netherlands) M Hermans (Netherlands) M Veldheer	6	7
(Poland) S Kielan (Poland) F Pieczonka	6	6
2	(Czech Republic) F Duda (Austria) N Oberleitner	4	4

Semifinals
(Belgium) M Geerts (Germany) T Rühl	7	6
(Brazil) D Dutra da Silva (Brazil) M Pucinelli de Almeida	5	2
3	(Netherlands) M Hermans (Netherlands) M Veldheer	7^{7}	1	[10]
(Poland) S Kielan (Poland) F Pieczonka	6^{5}	6	[7]

Final
(Belgium) M Geerts (Germany) T Rühl	7	7^{7}
3	(Netherlands) M Hermans (Netherlands) M Veldheer	5	6^{4}
