= 2023 Pune Challenger – Doubles =

Doubles
- 2023 Pune Challenger

Final
- Champions: (India) Anirudh Chandrasekar (India) Vijay Sundar Prashanth
- Runners-up: (Japan) Toshihide Matsui (Japan) Kaito Uesugi
- Score: 6–1, 4–6, [10–3]

Events
Singles	Doubles
- Pune Challenger

Purav Raja and Ramkumar Ramanathan were the defending champions but only Raja chose to defend his title, partnering Petr Nouza. Raja lost in the quarterfinals to Anirudh Chandrasekar and Vijay Sundar Prashanth.

Chandrasekar and Prashanth won the title after defeating Toshihide Matsui and Kaito Uesugi 6–1, 4–6, [10–3] in the final.

== Seeds ==
1. (Australia) Marc Polmans / (Australia) Max Purcell (withdrew)
2. (India) Arjun Kadhe / (Austria) Maximilian Neuchrist (semifinals, retired)
3. (Czech Republic) Marek Gengel / (Chinese Taipei) Hsu Yu-hsiou (withdrew)
4. (Czech Republic) Petr Nouza / (India) Purav Raja (quarterfinals)
5. (Japan) Toshihide Matsui / (Japan) Kaito Uesugi (final)

== Draw ==
Key

- Q = Qualifier
- WC = Wild card
- LL = Lucky loser
- Alt = Alternate
- ITF = ITF entry
- PR = Protected ranking
- SR = Special ranking
- SE = Special exempt
- JE = Junior exempt
- JR = Junior Accelerator Programme entrant
- CO = College Accelerator Programme entrant
- NG = Next Gen Accelerator Program entrant
- w/o = Walkover
- r = Retired
- d = Defaulted

First round
Alt	(India) M Sasikumar (India) V Vardhan	2	6	[10]
(Italy) F Maestrelli (Italy) L Nardi	6	3	[7]
(Zimbabwe) B Lock (Australia) A Santillan	4	6	[7]
(Australia) C Puttergill (Australia) D Sweeny	6	3	[10]
5	(Japan) T Matsui (Japan) K Uesugi	w/o
(Bulgaria) D Kuzmanov (Serbia) M Zekić
Alt	(Serbia) Boris Butulija (India) P Gunneswaran	6	6
WC	(India) Parikshit Somani (India) Manish Sureshkumar	2	2
Alt	(Australia) D Kelly (Ukraine) V Orlov	1	5
(India) A Chandrasekar (India) VS Prashanth	6	7
Alt	(France) H Mayot (Japan) Makoto Ochi	3	2
4	(Czech Republic) P Nouza (India) P Raja	6	6
(India) RC Bollipalli (India) N Kaliyanda Poonacha	6	6
(Japan) R Noguchi (Northern Mariana Islands) C Sinclair	4	4
WC	(India) Faisal Qamar (India) Fardeen Qamar	3	4
2	(India) A Kadhe (Austria) M Neuchrist	6	6

Quarterfinals
Alt	(India) M Sasikumar (India) V Vardhan	6	6
(Australia) C Puttergill (Australia) D Sweeny	2	3
5	(Japan) T Matsui (Japan) K Uesugi	7	6
Alt	(Serbia) B Butulija (India) P Gunneswaran	5	4
(India) A Chandrasekar (India) VS Prashanth	6	6
4	(Czech Republic) P Nouza (India) P Raja	2	2
(India) RC Bollipalli (India) N Kaliyanda Poonacha	1	3
2	(India) A Kadhe (Austria) M Neuchrist	6	6

Semifinals
Alt	(India) M Sasikumar (India) V Vardhan	2	5
5	(Japan) T Matsui (Japan) K Uesugi	6	7
(India) A Chandrasekar (India) VS Prashanth	4
2	(India) A Kadhe (Austria) M Neuchrist	0^{r}

Final
5	(Japan) T Matsui (Japan) K Uesugi	1	6	[3]
(India) A Chandrasekar (India) VS Prashanth	6	4	[10]
