= 2023 Pune Challenger – Singles =

Singles
- 2023 Pune Challenger

Final
- Champion: (Australia) Max Purcell
- Runner-up: (Italy) Luca Nardi
- Score: 6–2, 6–3

Events
Singles	Doubles
← 2019 ·	Pune Challenger	· 2024 →

James Duckworth was the defending champion but lost in the second round to Miljan Zekić.

Max Purcell won the title after defeating Luca Nardi 6–2, 6–3 in the final.

== Seeds ==
1. (Australia) James Duckworth (second round)
2. (Chinese Taipei) Tseng Chun-hsin (quarterfinals)
3. (Australia) Max Purcell (champion)
4. (Italy) Luca Nardi (final)
5. (Italy) Francesco Maestrelli (quarterfinals)
6. (Czech Republic) Dalibor Svrčina (first round)
7. (Chinese Taipei) Hsu Yu-hsiou (first round)
8. (Japan) Rio Noguchi (quarterfinals)

== Draw ==
Key

- Q = Qualifier
- WC = Wild card
- LL = Lucky loser
- Alt = Alternate
- ITF = ITF entry
- PR = Protected ranking
- SR = Special ranking
- SE = Special exempt
- JE = Junior exempt
- JR = Junior Accelerator Programme entrant
- CO = College Accelerator Programme entrant
- NG = Next Gen Accelerator Program entrant
- w/o = Walkover
- r = Retired
- d = Defaulted

=== Finals ===
Semifinals
(Serbia) Miljan Zekić	2	3
3	(Australia) Max Purcell	6	6
4	(Italy) Luca Nardi	7^{7}	1	7
Q	(Czech Republic) Dominik Palán	6^{4}	6	5

Final
3	(Australia) Max Purcell	6	6
4	(Italy) Luca Nardi	2	3

=== Top half ===
First round
1	(Australia) J Duckworth	6^{5}	6	6
Alt	(India) P Gunneswaran	7^{7}	2	3
(Serbia) M Zekić	6	6
Q	(South Korea) Y-s Chung	3	4
(Austria) M Neuchrist	6	7
WC	(India) A Kadhe	2	5
(France) H Mayot	6	6
7	(Chinese Taipei) Y-h Hsu	1	1
3	(Australia) M Purcell	3	6	6
WC	(India) M Sasikumar	6	3	0
Q	(Japan) Makoto Ochi	7	6^{1}	2
(Bulgaria) D Kuzmanov	5	7^{7}	6
(Australia) D Sweeny	6	6
LL	(United Kingdom) J Clarke	0	2
PR	(Australia) M Polmans	6	1	2
5	(Italy) F Maestrelli	1	6	6

Second round
1	(Australia) J Duckworth	6	4	6^{2}
(Serbia) M Zekić	4	6	7^{7}
(Austria) M Neuchrist	4	0^{r}
(France) H Mayot	6	0
3	(Australia) M Purcell	6	6
(Bulgaria) D Kuzmanov	2	4
(Australia) D Sweeny	7^{7}	3	5
5	(Italy) F Maestrelli	6^{2}	6	7

Quarterfinals
(Serbia) M Zekić	6	6
(France) H Mayot	2	4
3	(Australia) M Purcell	6	6
5	(Italy) F Maestrelli	0	2

Semifinals
(Serbia) M Zekić	2	3
3	(Australia) M Purcell	6	6

=== Bottom half ===
First round
8	(Japan) R Noguchi	4	6	7^{7}
(Czech Republic) M Gengel	6	2	6^{1}
(Portugal) F Ferreira Silva	7^{7}	6^{5}	4
Q	(Serbia) N Milojević	6^{1}	7^{7}	6
(Vietnam) NH Lý	1	1
(Italy) L Giustino	6	6
Q	(Zimbabwe) B Lock	1	5
4	(Italy) L Nardi	6	7
6	(Czech Republic) D Svrčina	4	6^{4}
Q	(Czech Republic) D Palán	6	7^{7}
(Japan) Y Uchiyama	6^{3}	6	4
WC	(India) S Nagal	7^{7}	4	6
(Serbia) H Međedović	6	6
Alt	(Japan) H Moriya	3	4
Q	(Australia) A Santillan	6	5	4
2	(Chinese Taipei) C-h Tseng	4	7	6

Second round
8	(Japan) R Noguchi	2	7	6
Q	(Serbia) N Milojević	6	5	3
(Italy) L Giustino	7^{13}	0	4
4	(Italy) L Nardi	6^{11}	6	6
Q	(Czech Republic) D Palán	4	6	6
WC	(India) S Nagal	6	3	4
(Serbia) H Međedović	4	4
2	(Chinese Taipei) C-h Tseng	6	6

Quarterfinals
8	(Japan) R Noguchi	3	0
4	(Italy) L Nardi	6	6
Q	(Czech Republic) D Palán	7^{7}	1	6
2	(Chinese Taipei) C-h Tseng	6^{4}	6	3

Semifinals
4	(Italy) L Nardi	7^{7}	1	7
Q	(Czech Republic) D Palán	6^{4}	6	5
