= 2026 Zagreb Open – Men's doubles =

Men's doubles
- 2026 Zagreb Open

Final
- Champions: (United Kingdom) Finn Bass (Bulgaria) Anthony Genov
- Runners-up: (United States) George Goldhoff (Denmark) Johannes Ingildsen
- Score: 4–6, 6–3, [10–8]

Events
Singles	men	women
Doubles	men	women
- Zagreb Open

Matej Dodig and Nino Serdarušić were the defending champions but chose to defend their title with different partners. Dodig partnered Alafia Ayeni but lost in the first round to George Goldhoff and Johannes Ingildsen. Serdarušić partnered Mili Poljičak but lost in the quarterfinals to Goldhoff and Ingildsen.

Finn Bass and Anthony Genov won the title after defeating Goldhoff and Ingildsen 4–6, 6–3, [10–8] in the final.

== Seeds ==
1. (Poland) Szymon Kielan / (Czech Republic) Andrew Paulson (quarterfinals)
2. (United States) George Goldhoff / (Denmark) Johannes Ingildsen (final)
3. (Czech Republic) Filip Duda / (Serbia) Stefan Latinović (first round)
4. (Sweden) Erik Grevelius / (Sweden) Adam Heinonen (first round)

== Draw ==
Key

- Q = Qualifier
- WC = Wild card
- LL = Lucky loser
- Alt = Alternate
- ITF = ITF entry
- PR = Protected ranking
- SR = Special ranking
- SE = Special exempt
- JE = Junior exempt
- JR = Junior Accelerator Programme entrant
- CO = College Accelerator Programme entrant
- NG = Next Gen Accelerator Program entrant
- w/o = Walkover
- r = Retired
- d = Defaulted

First round
1	(Poland) S Kielan (Czech Republic) A Paulson	w/o
(Ecuador) A Andrade (Ecuador) Á Guillén Meza
(United Kingdom) F Bass (Bulgaria) A Genov	6	7
(Bosnia and Herzegovina) M Bašić (Ukraine) D Molchanov	1	5
3	(Czech Republic) F Duda (Serbia) S Latinović	3	6	[3]
WC	(Croatia) Emanuel Ivanišević (Croatia) Josip Šimundža	6	3	[10]
Alt	(Croatia) D Ajduković (Croatia) A Kalender	5	2
(Venezuela) Juan José Bianchi (United States) J Sheehy	7	6
(United Kingdom) S Duncan (United Kingdom) M Whitehouse	7^{7}	7^{10}
(Bosnia and Herzegovina) N Fatić (Serbia) M Sabanov	6^{3}	6^{8}
WC	(Croatia) Vid Marić (Croatia) L Mikrut	7	6
4	(Sweden) E Grevelius (Sweden) A Heinonen	5	4
(Croatia) M Poljičak (Croatia) N Serdarušić	6	6
(Germany) T Rühl (Germany) K Wehnelt	3	2
(United States) A Ayeni (Croatia) M Dodig	2	4
2	(United States) G Goldhoff (Denmark) J Ingildsen	6	6

Quarterfinals
1	(Poland) S Kielan (Czech Republic) A Paulson	6	6^{3}	[8]
(United Kingdom) F Bass (Bulgaria) A Genov	4	7^{7}	[10]
WC	(Croatia) E Ivanišević (Croatia) J Šimundža	4	4
(Venezuela) JJ Bianchi (United States) J Sheehy	6	6
(United Kingdom) S Duncan (United Kingdom) M Whitehouse	4	4
WC	(Croatia) V Marić (Croatia) L Mikrut	6	6
(Croatia) M Poljičak (Croatia) N Serdarušić	3	7	[4]
2	(United States) G Goldhoff (Denmark) J Ingildsen	6	5	[10]

Semifinals
(United Kingdom) F Bass (Bulgaria) A Genov	6	6
(Venezuela) JJ Bianchi (United States) J Sheehy	3	4
WC	(Croatia) V Marić (Croatia) L Mikrut	2^{r}
2	(United States) G Goldhoff (Denmark) J Ingildsen	5

Final
(United Kingdom) F Bass (Bulgaria) A Genov	4	6	[10]
2	(United States) G Goldhoff (Denmark) J Ingildsen	6	3	[8]
