= 2023 Layjet Open =

- Date: 18–24 September
- Edition: 1st
- Surface: Clay
- Location: Bad Waltersdorf, Austria

Champions

Singles
- (Italy) Andrea Pellegrino

Doubles
- (Germany) Constantin Frantzen / (Germany) Hendrik Jebens
- Layjet Open

The 2023 Layjet Open was a professional tennis tournament played on clay courts. It was the 1st edition of the tournament which was part of the 2023 ATP Challenger Tour. It took place in Bad Waltersdorf, Austria between 18 and 24 September 2023.

== Singles main-draw entrants ==
=== Seeds ===
Country	Player	Rank^{1}	Seed
ESP	Roberto Carballés Baena	60	1
~~ESP~~	~~Bernabé Zapata Miralles~~	~~75~~	~~2~~
ESP	Jaume Munar	85	3
ESP	Albert Ramos Viñolas	95	4
AUT	Jurij Rodionov	109	5
ESP	Pedro Martínez	118	6
FRA	Benoît Paire	120	7
KAZ	Timofey Skatov	123	8

^{1} Rankings are as of 11 September 2023.

=== Other entrants ===
The following players received wildcards into the singles main draw:

- (Italy) Fabio Fognini
- (Austria) Joel Schwärzler
- (Austria) Sebastian Sorger

The following players received entry from the qualifying draw:

- (Turkey) Ergi Kırkın
- (Germany) Marvin Möller
- (Czech Republic) Petr Nouza
- (Italy) Andrea Picchione
- (Germany) Henri Squire
- (Germany) Timo Stodder

The following players received entry as lucky losers:

- (Poland) Maks Kaśnikowski
- (Austria) Sandro Kopp

== Champions ==
=== Singles ===
- (Italy) Andrea Pellegrino def. (Austria) Dennis Novak 1–6, 7–6^{(7–5)}, 6–3.

=== Doubles ===
- (Germany) Constantin Frantzen / (Germany) Hendrik Jebens def. (Italy) Marco Bortolotti / (Italy) Francesco Passaro 6–1, 6–2.
