= 2026 Zagreb Open – Men's singles =

Men's singles
- 2026 Zagreb Open

Final
- Champion: (United Kingdom) Jan Choinski
- Runner-up: (Hungary) Zsombor Piros
- Score: 7–6^{(7–5)}, 7–6^{(7–2)}

Events
Singles	men	women
Doubles	men	women
- Zagreb Open

Dino Prižmić was the defending champion but chose not to defend his title.

Jan Choinski won the title after defeating Zsombor Piros 7–6^{(7–5)}, 7–6^{(7–2)} in the final.

== Seeds ==
1. (United Kingdom) Jan Choinski (champion)
2. (Japan) Shintaro Mochizuki (first round)
3. (Denmark) Elmer Møller (semifinals)
4. (United Kingdom) Arthur Fery (semifinals)
5. (Hungary) Zsombor Piros (final)
6. (Luxembourg) Chris Rodesch (quarterfinals)
7. (Denmark) August Holmgren (second round)
8. (Italy) Marco Cecchinato (second round)

== Draw ==
Key

- Q = Qualifier
- WC = Wild card
- LL = Lucky loser
- Alt = Alternate
- ITF = ITF entry
- PR = Protected ranking
- SR = Special ranking
- SE = Special exempt
- JE = Junior exempt
- JR = Junior Accelerator Programme entrant
- CO = College Accelerator Programme entrant
- NG = Next Gen Accelerator Program entrant
- w/o = Walkover
- r = Retired
- d = Defaulted

=== Finals ===
Semifinals
1	(United Kingdom) Jan Choinski	5	7^{7}	6
4	(United Kingdom) Arthur Fery	7	6^{4}	2
3	(Denmark) Elmer Møller	2	6	4
5	(Hungary) Zsombor Piros	6	3	6

Final
1	(United Kingdom) Jan Choinski	7^{7}	7^{7}
5	(Hungary) Zsombor Piros	6^{5}	6^{2}

=== Top half ===
First round
1	(United Kingdom) J Choinski	2	6	6
(Argentina) JP Ficovich	6	4	4
Alt	(Brazil) T Seyboth Wild	4	3
Q	(Colombia) DE Galán	6	6
(Croatia) L Mikrut	6	3	6
(Germany) J Engel	4	6	2
CO	(United States) S Dostanic	7	4	2
6	(Luxembourg) C Rodesch	5	6	6
4	(United Kingdom) A Fery	7	6
(Ukraine) V Sachko	5	3
WC	(Croatia) M Poljičak	6^{5}	7^{7}	5
Q	(Switzerland) D Stricker	7^{7}	6^{2}	7
JR	(France) YT Alexandrescou	w/o
Q	(Australia) T Kokkinakis
(Croatia) M Dodig	6^{8}	6	3
7	(Denmark) A Holmgren	7^{10}	3	6

Second round
1	(United Kingdom) J Choinski	2	7^{7}	6
Q	(Colombia) DE Galán	6	6^{2}	4
(Croatia) L Mikrut	1	2
6	(Luxembourg) C Rodesch	6	6
4	(United Kingdom) A Fery	6	6
Q	(Switzerland) D Stricker	1	4
JR	(France) YT Alexandrescou	6^{3}	6	6
7	(Denmark) A Holmgren	7^{7}	3	3

Quarterfinals
1	(United Kingdom) J Choinski	6^{0}	6	7
6	(Luxembourg) C Rodesch	7^{7}	3	5
4	(United Kingdom) A Fery	3	7	6
JR	(France) YT Alexandrescou	6	5	3

Semifinals
1	(United Kingdom) J Choinski	5	7^{7}	6
4	(United Kingdom) A Fery	7	6^{4}	2

=== Bottom half ===
First round
8	(Italy) M Cecchinato	7	6
Alt	(United Kingdom) H Wendelken	5	4
Q	(Brazil) T Monteiro	6	4	4
(Ecuador) A Andrade	4	6	6
(Brazil) JL Reis da Silva	6	6
(France) L Pavlovic	4	1
Q	(Bosnia and Herzegovina) N Fatić	3	7^{7}	1
3	(Denmark) E Møller	6	6^{5}	6
5	(Hungary) Z Piros	4	6	6
Q	(Czech Republic) J Forejtek	6	1	0
Alt	(Ecuador) Á Guillén Meza	2	4^{r}
WC	(Croatia) Josip Šimundža	6	3
NG	(Germany) D Dedura	6	6
WC	(Croatia) Emanuel Ivanišević	1	3
(Austria) L Neumayer	6	6
2	(Japan) S Mochizuki	2	2

Second round
8	(Italy) M Cecchinato	4	4
(Ecuador) A Andrade	6	6
(Brazil) JL Reis da Silva	5	2
3	(Denmark) E Møller	7	6
5	(Hungary) Z Piros	6	6
WC	(Croatia) J Šimundža	4	4
NG	(Germany) D Dedura	4	4
(Austria) L Neumayer	6	6

Quarterfinals
(Ecuador) A Andrade	5	2
3	(Denmark) E Møller	7	6
5	(Hungary) Z Piros	4	6	6
(Austria) L Neumayer	6	4	3

Semifinals
3	(Denmark) E Møller	2	6	4
5	(Hungary) Z Piros	6	3	6
