= 2025 Dutch Open – Singles =

Singles
- 2025 Dutch Open

Final
- Champion: (United Kingdom) Jan Choinski
- Runner-up: (Belgium) Kimmer Coppejans
- Score: 6–4, 3–6, 6–3

Events
| Singles | Doubles |
- Dutch Open

Tomás Barrios Vera was the defending champion but chose not to defend his title.

Jan Choinski won the title after defeating Kimmer Coppejans 6–4, 3–6, 6–3 in the final.

== Seeds ==
1. (Hungary) Zsombor Piros (first round)
2. (Netherlands) Guy den Ouden (semifinals)
3. (Lebanon) Benjamin Hassan (quarterfinals)
4. (France) Titouan Droguet (second round)
5. (United Kingdom) Jan Choinski (champion)
6. (Belgium) Gauthier Onclin (quarterfinals)
7. (France) Clément Tabur (first round)
8. (Bulgaria) Dimitar Kuzmanov (second round)

== Draw ==
Key

- Q = Qualifier
- WC = Wild card
- LL = Lucky loser
- Alt = Alternate
- ITF = ITF entry
- PR = Protected ranking
- SR = Special ranking
- SE = Special exempt
- JE = Junior exempt
- JR = Junior Accelerator Programme entrant
- CO = College Accelerator Programme entrant
- NG = Next Gen Accelerator Program entrant
- w/o = Walkover
- r = Retired
- d = Defaulted

=== Finals ===
Semifinals
(Belgium) Kimmer Coppejans | 3 | 6 | 7^{7}
(Argentina) Alex Barrena | 6 | 2 | 6^{4}
5 | (United Kingdom) Jan Choinski | 7^{7} | 5 | 6
2 | (Netherlands) Guy den Ouden | 6^{5} | 7 | 2

Final
(Belgium) Kimmer Coppejans | 4 | 6 | 3
5 | (United Kingdom) Jan Choinski | 6 | 3 | 6

=== Top half ===
First round
1 | (Hungary) Z Piros | 3 | 6^{4}
Q | (Germany) M Möller | 6 | 7^{7}
LL | (Netherlands) J Sels | 6^{2} | 5
Q | (Argentina) N Kicker | 7^{7} | 7
(Brazil) JL Reis da Silva | 6 | 5 | 4
(Belgium) K Coppejans | 1 | 7 | 6
Q | (Czech Republic) M Krumich | 3 | 6 | 3
8 | (Bulgaria) D Kuzmanov | 6 | 3 | 6
4 | (France) T Droguet | 6 | 6
Q | (United Kingdom) A Matusevich | 3 | 1
(Argentina) A Barrena | 6 | 6
(Romania) FC Jianu | 4 | 3
LL | (Brazil) D Dutra da Silva | 4 | 6^{8}
Q | (Italy) F Bondioli | 6 | 7^{10}
(France) G Blancaneaux | 7^{7} | 7^{19}
7 | (France) C Tabur | 6^{5} | 6^{17}

Second round
Q | (Germany) M Möller | 5 | 4
Q | (Argentina) N Kicker | 7 | 6
(Belgium) K Coppejans | 7^{7} | 7
8 | (Bulgaria) D Kuzmanov | 6^{4} | 5
4 | (France) T Droguet | 6 | 2 | 5
(Argentina) A Barrena | 2 | 6 | 7
Q | (Italy) F Bondioli | 6^{4} | 6 | 5
(France) G Blancaneaux | 7^{7} | 3 | 7

Quarterfinals
Q | (Argentina) N Kicker | 5 | 6 | 0
(Belgium) K Coppejans | 7 | 4 | 6
(Argentina) A Barrena | 6 | 6
(France) G Blancaneaux | 4 | 4

Semifinals
(Belgium) K Coppejans | 3 | 6 | 7^{7}
(Argentina) A Barrena | 6 | 2 | 6^{4}

=== Bottom half ===
First round
5 | (United Kingdom) J Choinski | 6 | 6
WC | (Netherlands) Manvydas Balciunas | 1 | 2
NG | (Croatia) M Dodig | 4 | 6 | 6
Q | (Netherlands) Stijn Slump | 6 | 4 | 3
(Portugal) F Ferreira Silva | 7^{7} | 4 | 6
I Gakhov | 6^{1} | 6 | 4
WC | (Netherlands) M Röttgering | 4 | 4
3 | (Lebanon) B Hassan | 6 | 6
6 | (Belgium) G Onclin | 7 | 6
(Italy) L Giustino | 5 | 2
(Netherlands) M Houkes | 6 | 6
Alt | (Belgium) M Geerts | 4 | 4
(France) Mathys Erhard | 6 | 6^{2} | 6
WC | (Netherlands) Abel Forger | 4 | 7^{7} | 3
Alt | (Brazil) M Pucinelli de Almeida | 3 | 6 | 4
2 | (Netherlands) G den Ouden | 6 | 3 | 6

Second round
5 | (United Kingdom) J Choinski | 6 | 7
NG | (Croatia) M Dodig | 4 | 5
(Portugal) F Ferreira Silva | 1 | 6 | 0
3 | (Lebanon) B Hassan | 6 | 1 | 6
6 | (Belgium) G Onclin | 6 | 7
(Netherlands) M Houkes | 4 | 5
(France) M Erhard | 4 | 3
2 | (Netherlands) G den Ouden | 6 | 6

Quarterfinals
5 | (United Kingdom) J Choinski | 6 | 6
3 | (Lebanon) B Hassan | 2 | 2
6 | (Belgium) G Onclin | 2 | 3
2 | (Netherlands) G den Ouden | 6 | 6

Semifinals
5 | (United Kingdom) J Choinski | 7^{7} | 5 | 6
2 | (Netherlands) G den Ouden | 6^{5} | 7 | 2
