= 2025 Layjet Open =

- Date: 15–21 September
- Edition: 3rd
- Surface: Clay
- Location: Bad Waltersdorf, Austria

Champions

Singles
- (United Kingdom) Jan Choinski

Doubles
- (Austria) David Pichler / (Croatia) Nino Serdarušić
- Layjet Open

The 2025 Layjet Open presented by Kronen Zeitung was a professional tennis tournament played on clay courts. It was the third edition of the tournament which was part of the 2025 ATP Challenger Tour. It took place in Bad Waltersdorf, Austria between 15 and 21 September 2025.

== Singles main-draw entrants ==
=== Seeds ===
Country	Player	Rank^{1}	Seed
ESP	Pedro Martínez	67	1
CZE	Vít Kopřiva	88	2
ESP	Roberto Carballés Baena	109	3
ARG	Thiago Agustín Tirante	116	4
ESP	Pablo Carreño Busta	123	5
SRB	Dušan Lajović	127	6
COL	Daniel Elahi Galán	131	7
ARG	Román Andrés Burruchaga	143	8

^{1} Rankings are as of 8 September 2025.

=== Other entrants ===
The following players received wildcards into the singles main draw:

- (Austria) Sandro Kopp
- (Austria) Joel Schwärzler
- (Austria) Sebastian Sorger

The following player received entry into the singles main draw using a protected ranking:

- (Spain) ~~Pablo Llamas Ruiz~~

The following player received entry into the singles main draw as a special exempt:

- (Switzerland) ~~Kilian Feldbausch~~

The following players received entry into the singles main draw as alternates:

- (Argentina) Facundo Díaz Acosta
- (Croatia) Matej Dodig
- (Sweden) Elias Ymer

The following players received entry from the qualifying draw:

- (Czech Republic) Hynek Bartoň
- (Czech Republic) Zdeněk Kolář
- (Slovakia) Jozef Kovalík
- (Austria) Dennis Novak
- (Czech Republic) Tadeáš Paroulek
- (Germany) Marko Topo

The following players received entry as lucky losers:

- (Germany) Marvin Möller
- (Italy) Gabriele Piraino
- (Germany) Cedrik-Marcel Stebe

== Champions ==
=== Singles ===
- (United Kingdom) Jan Choinski def. (Czech Republic) Vít Kopřiva 7–5, 6–4.

=== Doubles ===
- (Austria) David Pichler / (Croatia) Nino Serdarušić def. (Czech Republic) Jiří Barnat / (Czech Republic) Filip Duda 6–3, 6–3.
