= 2025 Bonn Open =

- Date: 4 – 10 August
- Edition: 2nd
- Surface: Clay
- Location: Bonn, Germany

Champions

Singles
- (Austria) Jurij Rodionov

Doubles
- (Austria) Neil Oberleitner / (Netherlands) Mick Veldheer
- Bonn Open

The 2025 Bonn Open was a professional tennis tournament played on clay courts. It was the 2nd edition of the tournament which was part of the 2025 ATP Challenger Tour. It took place in Bonn, Germany between 4 and 10 August 2025.

== Champions ==
=== Singles ===
- (Austria) Jurij Rodionov def. (Kazakhstan) Timofey Skatov 3–6, 6–2, 6–4.

=== Doubles ===
- (Austria) Neil Oberleitner / (Netherlands) Mick Veldheer def. (Germany) Tim Rühl / (Germany) Patrick Zahraj 4–6, 7–6^{(7–3)}, [12–10].

== Singles main-draw entrants ==
=== Seeds ===
Country	Player	Rank	Seed
~~NED~~	~~Botic van de Zandschulp~~	~~87~~	~~1~~
BEL	Raphaël Collignon	90	2
DEN	Elmer Møller	105	3
LTU	Vilius Gaubas	149	4
GBR	Jan Choinski	151	5
ARG	Federico Coria	154	6
AUT	Jurij Rodionov	184	7
LBN	Benjamin Hassan	188	8

- ^{1} Rankings are as of 28 July 2025.

=== Other entrants ===
The following players received wildcards into the singles main draw:

- (Germany) Diego Dedura
- (Germany) Jamie Mackenzie
- (Germany) Niels McDonald

The following player received entry into the singles main draw as a special exempt:

- (Sweden) Olle Wallin

The following player received entry into the singles main draw through the Next Gen Accelerator programme:

- (Austria) Joel Schwärzler

The following player received entry into the singles main draw as an alternate:

- (India) Sumit Nagal

The following players received entry from the qualifying draw:

- (Brazil) Pedro Boscardin Dias
- (Italy) Marco Cecchinato
- (Hungary) Péter Fajta
- (Czech Republic) Martin Krumich
- (Bulgaria) Yanaki Milev
- (Argentina) Gonzalo Villanueva

The following player received entry as a lucky loser:

- (Germany) Mats Rosenkranz
