= Finn Bass =

English tennis player (born 1999)

- Country (sports): Great Britain
- Born: 9 October 1999 (age 27) Stevenage, England
- Height: 1.80 m (5 ft 11 in)
- Plays: Right-handed (two-handed backhand)
- College: Baylor
- Coach: Dan Kiernan
- Prize money: US $74,748

Singles
- Career record: 0–0 (at ATP Tour level, Grand Slam level, and in Davis Cup)
- Career titles: 0
- Highest ranking: No. 756 (10 September 2018)
- Current ranking: No. 1,183 (9 November 2026)

Doubles
- Career record: 0–0 (at ATP Tour level, Grand Slam level, and in Davis Cup)
- Career titles: 1 Challenger, 13 ITF
- Highest ranking: No. 173 (9 November 2026)
- Current ranking: No. 173 (9 November 2026)
- Last updated on: 9 November 2026.

Jake Finn Bass (born 9 October 1999) is an English tennis player. Bass has a career high ATP singles ranking of No. 756 achieved on 10 September 2018 and a career high ATP doubles ranking of No. 173 achieved on 9 November 2026.

Bass won his first ATP Challenger doubles title at the 2026 Zagreb Open, partnering with Anthony Genov to defeat George Goldhoff and Johannes Ingildsen in the final.

Bass played college tennis at Baylor.
