= Vijay Sundar Prashanth =

Indian tennis player (born 1986)

Vijay SP Natarajan
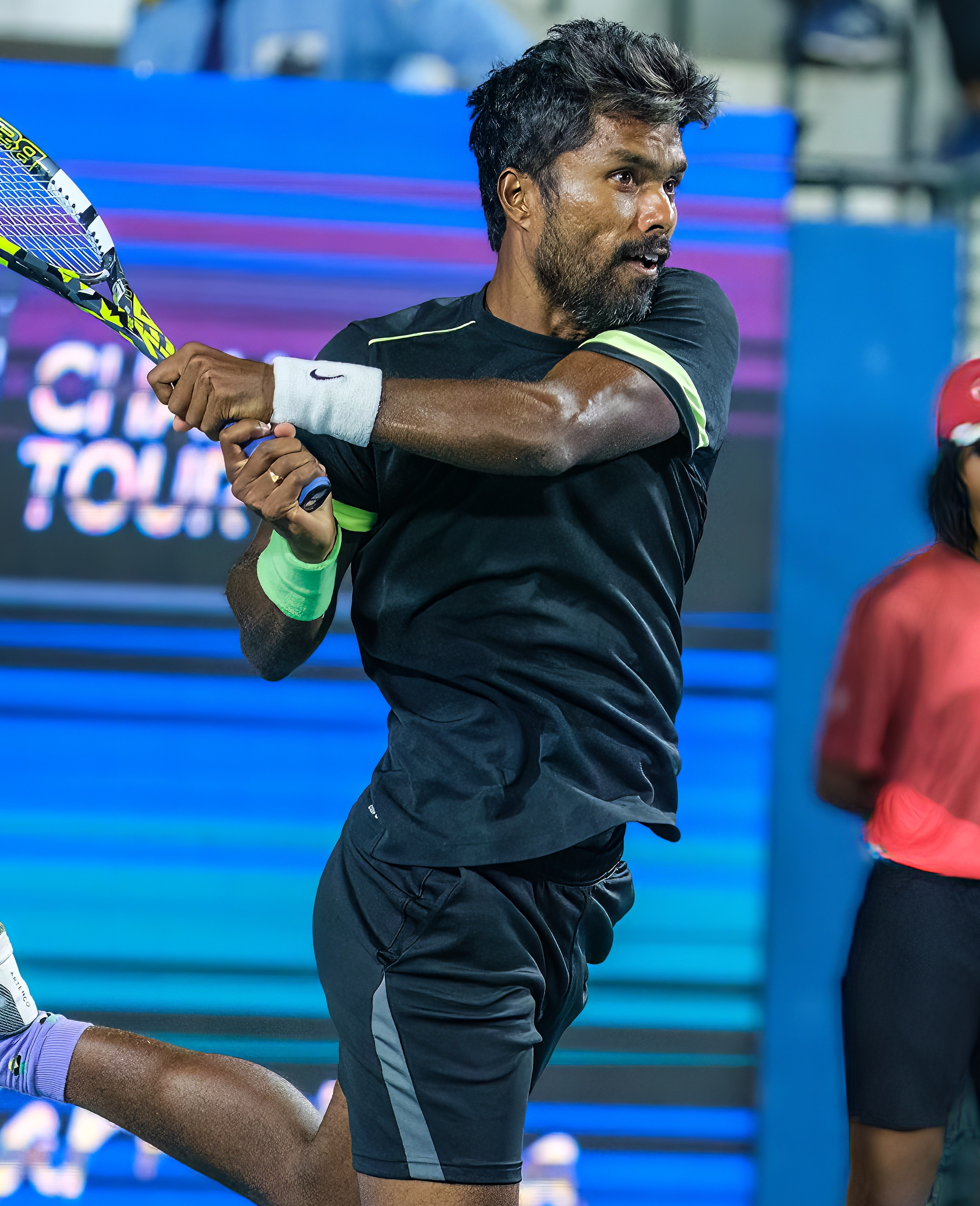
- Prashanth at the 2023 Bengaluru Open
- Full name: Vijay SP Natarajan
- Country (sports): India
- Residence: Chennai, India
- Born: 27 October 1986 (age 39) Chennai, India
- Height: 1.8 m (5 ft 11 in)
- Plays: Right-handed (two handed-backhand)
- Prize money: $ 289,429

Singles
- Career record: 0–1 (at ATP Tour level, Grand Slam level, and in Davis Cup)
- Career titles: 4 ITF
- Highest ranking: No. 335 (5 October 2015)

Doubles
- Career record: 10–15
- Career titles: 1
- Highest ranking: No. 80 (29 January 2024)
- Current ranking: No. 99 (16 June 2025)

Grand Slam doubles results
- Australian Open: 1R (2024, 2025)
- US Open: 2R (2025)
Medal record
Men's tennis
Representing India
Asian Indoor Games
Gold medal – first place	2017 Ashgabat	Men's doubles
Silver medal – second place	2017 Ashgabat	Men's singles
South Asian Games
Gold medal – first place	2016 Guwahati	Men's doubles
- Last updated on: 1 December 2025.

Vijay SP Natarajan (born 27 October 1986) is an Indian professional tennis player. He has a career-high ATP doubles ranking of No. 80 achieved on 29 January 2024. He also has a career-high ATP singles ranking of No. 335 achieved on 5 October 2015.

== Early life ==
Vijay was born in Chennai. He started playing tennis at the age of 5, when his grandfather introduced him to the sport.

He did his schooling at PSSB (Padma Seshadri Bala Bhavan) and completed his graduation from Loyola college.

== Professional career ==
=== 2015: ATP singles debut; National Games in Trivandrum, Kerala ===
He caught everyone's eye, when he won against Indian Davis Cup player Yuki Bhambri at 2015 Aircel Chennai Open. He went on to become the fourth Indian ever to qualify for the main draw.

Medalist at the 35th National Games held in Trivandrum, Kerala in 2015 [TEAM- Gold medal; INDIVIDUAL DOUBLES- Silver medal]

=== 2016: South Asian Games in Guwahati, India ===
Prashanth won the men's doubles gold medal at the 2016 South Asian Games.

=== 2017: Indoor Asian Games in Ashgabat, Turkmenistan ===
Prashanth won Individual Mens Doubles Gold and Individual Mens Singles Silver for India at the Indoor Asian Games held in Ashgabat, Turkmenistan in September 2017.

=== 2023: Doubles Top 100 ===
Prashanth cracked into the doubles Top 100 for the first time on 13 November 2023 after reaching the finals of the 2023 HPP Open in Helsinki, Finland.

=== 2024: Maiden ATP title at the Hangzhou Open ===
Partnering with Jeevan Nedunchezhiyan, Prashanth won the doubles title at the 2024 Hangzhou Open, defeating Constantin Frantzen and Hendrik Jebens in the final.

== ATP Tour finals ==
=== Doubles: 1 (1 title) ===
Legend Grand Slam tournaments (0–0) ATP World Tour Finals (0–0) ATP World Tour Masters 1000 (0–0) ATP World Tour 500 Series (0–0) ATP World Tour 250 Series (1–0)	Titles by surface Hard (1–0) Clay (0–0) Grass (0–0)	Titles by setting Outdoor (1–0) Indoor (0–0)

Result	W–L	Date	Tournament	Tier	Surface	Partner	Opponents	Score
Win	1–0	Sep 2024	Hangzhou Open, China	ATP 250	Hard	(India) Jeevan Nedunchezhiyan	(Germany) Hendrik Jebens (Germany) Constantin Frantzen	4–6, 7–6^{(7–5)}, [10–7]

== ATP Challenger and ITF Tour finals ==
=== Doubles: 68 (28–40) ===
Legend ATP Challengers (8–12) ITF Futures/World Tennis Tour (20–28)	Titles by surface Hard (18–30) Clay (10–10) Grass (0–0)

Result	W–L	Date	Tournament	Tier	Surface	Partner	Opponents	Score
Loss	0–1	Jul 2007	India F6, Chennai	Futures	Clay	(India) Sriram Balaji	(India) Jeevan Nedunchezhiyan (India) Vivek Shokeen	5–7, 4–6
Loss	0–2	Mar 2009	India F1, Chandigarh	Futures	Hard	(India) Mithun Murali	(India) Divij Sharan (India) Vishnu Vardhan	6–4, 5–7, [7–10]
Win	1–2	May 2011	India F5, Chennai	Futures	Hard	(India) Arun-Prakash Rajagopalan	(Indonesia) Elbert Sie (Thailand) Peerakiat Siriluethaiwattana	7–5, 6–4
Loss	1–3	Jun 2011	India F8, Delhi	Futures	Hard	(India) Arun-Prakash Rajagopalan	(Russia) Vitali Reshetnikov (India) Karunuday Singh	7–5, 2–6, [4–10]
Loss	1–4	Aug 2011	Turkey F23, Istanbul	Futures	Hard	(Italy) Riccardo Ghedin	(Australia) Brydan Klein (Australia) Dane Propoggia	3–6, 6–7^{(3–7)}
Loss	1–5	Dec 2011	India F12, Kolkata	Futures	Clay	(India) Jeevan Nedunchezhiyan	(India) Sriram Balaji (India) Vinayak Sharma Kaza	3–6, 6–4, [3–10]
Loss	1–6	Mar 2012	India F2, Bhopal	Futures	Hard	(India) Arun-Prakash Rajagopalan	(India) Sriram Balaji (India) Ranjeet Virali-Murugesan	6–7^{(5–7)}, 6–3, [6–10]
Loss	1–7	Mar 2012	India F3, Bhimavaram	Futures	Hard	(India) Arun-Prakash Rajagopalan	(India) Rohan Gajjar (India) Saketh Myneni	5–7, 3–6
Win	2–7	Apr 2012	India F4, Trichy	Futures	Clay	(India) Jeevan Nedunchezhiyan	(India) Rupesh Roy (India) Vivek Shokeen	7–6^{(7–3)}, 6–7^{(5–7)}, [10–7]
Win	3–7	Jul 2012	Germany F7, Römerberg	Futures	Clay	(India) Sriram Balaji	(Austria) Lukas Jastraunig (Austria) Marc Rath	7–5, 6–4
Loss	3–8	Jul 2012	India F10, Coimbatore	Futures	Hard	(India) Vinayak Sharma Kaza	(India) Saketh Myneni (India) Arun-Prakash Rajagopalan	3–6, 2–6
Loss	3–9	Dec 2012	India F15, Davanagere	Futures	Hard	(India) Arun-Prakash Rajagopalan	(India) Sriram Balaji (India) Jeevan Nedunchezhiyan	7–6^{(7–4)}, 4–6, [1–10]
Loss	3–10	Dec 2012	India F17, Belgaum	Futures	Hard	(India) Arun-Prakash Rajagopalan	(United States) Amrit Narasimhan (United States) Michael Shabaz	6–7^{(3–7)}, 5–7
Loss	3–11	Oct 2013	Great Britain F20, Sunderland	Futures	Hard	(Netherlands) David Pel	(United Kingdom) Josh Goodall (United Kingdom) Harry Meehan	3–6, 6–4, [8–10]
Win	4–11	Aug 2014	Iran F9, Tehran	Futures	Clay	(India) Vinayak Sharma Kaza	(Greece) Markos Kalovelonis (Iran) Amirvala Madanchi	6–3, 6–4
Loss	4–12	Nov 2014	India F6, Kolkata	Futures	Clay	(India) Vishnu Vardhan	(India) Sriram Balaji (India) Ranjeet Virali-Murugesan	4–6, 2–6
Loss	4–13	Nov 2014	India F7, Raipur	Futures	Hard	(India) Vinayak Sharma Kaza	(India) Jeevan Nedunchezhiyan (India) Vishnu Vardhan	6–2, 3–6, [6–10]
Loss	4–14	Nov 2014	India F8, Gwalior	Futures	Hard	(India) Vinayak Sharma Kaza	(India) Niki Kaliyanda Poonacha (India) Shahbaaz Khan	2–6, 3–6
Win	5–14	Mar 2015	India F1, Chandigarh	Futures	Hard	(India) Jeevan Nedunchezhiyan	(Spain) Enrique López Pérez (Spain) David Pérez Sanz	6–3, 6–4
Win	6–14	Aug 2015	India F11, Chennai	Futures	Hard	(India) Jeevan Nedunchezhiyan	(India) Mohit Mayur Jayaprakash (India) Vinayak Sharma Kaza	6–4, 7–6^{(7–5)}
Win	7–14	Sep 2015	India F12, Chennai	Futures	Hard	(India) Jeevan Nedunchezhiyan	(Greece) Markos Kalovelonis (Kazakhstan) Timur Khabibulin	4–6, 6–3, [10–4]
Loss	7–15	Sep 2015	India F13, Coimbatore	Futures	Hard	(India) Mohit Mayur Jayaprakash	(China) Gao Xin (China) Ouyang Bowen	6–2, 3–6, [5–10]
Win	8–15	Sep 2015	India F15, Madurai	Futures	Hard	(India) Sumit Nagal	(India) Anirudh Chandrasekar (India) Vignesh Peranamallur	6–3, 7–5
Loss	8–16	Oct 2015	Bangalore, India	Challenger	Hard	(United States) John Paul Fruttero	(India) Saketh Myneni (India) Sanam Singh	7–5, 4–6, [2–10]
Win	9–16	Apr 2016	China F5, Taizhou	Futures	Hard	(Indonesia) Christopher Rungkat	(Philippines) Jeson Patrombon (China) Wang Aoran	6–4, 6–0
Win	10–16	May 2016	India F3, Jassowal	Futures	Hard	(India) Sriram Balaji	(United States) John Lamble (Portugal) Bernardo Saraiva	6–3, 6–3
Win	11–16	Sep 2016	Thailand F2, Hua Hin	Futures	Hard	(India) Sriram Balaji	(Thailand) Pruchya Isaro (Japan) Ken Onishi	6–2, 6–2
Win	12–16	Sep 2016	India F4, Chennai	Futures	Clay	(India) Sriram Balaji	(India) Kunal Anand (India) Anvit Bendre	7–6^{(7–2)}, 6–1
Loss	12–17	Sep 2016	India F6, Coimbatore	Futures	Hard	(India) Anvit Bendre	(India) Sriram Balaji (India) Vishnu Vardhan	3–6, 1–6
Win	13–17	Feb 2017	India F1, Chandigarh	Futures	Hard	(India) Sanam Singh	(Germany) Pirmin Hänle (United States) Shane Vinsant	7–6^{(7–4)}, 6–4
Loss	13–18	Feb 2017	India F2, Jorhat	Futures	Hard	(India) Mohit Mayur Jayaprakash	(India) Sriram Balaji (India) Vishnu Vardhan	6–7^{(5–7)}, 6–4, [6–10]
Loss	13–19	Mar 2017	India F3, Guwahati	Futures	Hard	(India) Sanam Singh	(India) Sriram Balaji (India) Vishnu Vardhan	3–6, 6–3, [6–10]
Loss	13–20	Jul 2017	Båstad, Sweden	Challenger	Clay	(India) Sriram Balaji	(Turkey) Tuna Altuna (Czech Republic) Václav Šafránek	1–6, 4–6
Loss	13–21	Aug 2017	Thailand F6, Nonthaburi	Futures	Hard	(India) Vinayak Sharma Kaza	(Thailand) Pruchya Isaro (Japan) Sho Katayama	4–6, 6–2, [8–10]
Win	14–21	Oct 2017	Ho Chi Minh City, Vietnam	Challenger	Hard	(India) Saketh Myneni	(Japan) Ben McLachlan (Japan) Go Soeda	7–6^{(7–3)}, 7–6^{(7–5)}
Win	15–21	Dec 2017	Indonesia F8, Jakarta	Futures	Hard	(Indonesia) Justin Barki	(Japan) Sora Fukuda (Australia) Scott Puodziunas	4–6, 7–6^{(7–5)}, [10–4]
Loss	15–22	Mar 2018	India F1, Bhubaneswar	Futures	Hard	(India) Arjun Kadhe	(India) Sidharth Rawat (India) Manish Sureshkumar	3–6, 2–6
Win	16–22	Mar 2018	India F2, Kolkata	Futures	Hard	(India) Arjun Kadhe	(Spain) Carlos Boluda-Purkiss (Vietnam) Lý Hoàng Nam	6–2, 5–7, [10–5]
Win	17–22	Mar 2018	India F3, Chandigarh	Futures	Hard	(India) Arjun Kadhe	(India) Mohit Mayur Jayaprakash (India) Vinayak Sharma Kaza	6–3, 6–1
Win	18–22	Mar 2018	India F4, Trivandrum	Futures	Clay	(India) Arjun Kadhe	(Brazil) Caio Silva (Brazil) Thales Turini	6–7^{(5–7)}, 6–4, [10–7]
Loss	18–23	Apr 2018	Uzbekistan F2, Karshi	Futures	Hard	(India) Saketh Myneni	(Russia) Konstantin Kravchuk (Russia) Roman Safiullin	6–3, 5–7, [7–10]
Loss	18–24	Jun 2018	Fergana, Uzbekistan	Challenger	Hard	(India) Saketh Myneni	(Russia) Ivan Gakhov (Russia) Alexander Pavlioutchenkov	4–6, 4–6
Win	19–24	Nov 2018	Pune, India	Challenger	Hard	(India) Ramkumar Ramanathan	(Chinese Taipei) Hsieh Cheng-peng (Chinese Taipei) Yang Tsung-hua	7–6^{(7–3)}, 6–7^{(5–7)}, [10–7]
Loss	19–25	Jan 2019	M15 Anning, China	World Tennis Tour	Clay	(India) Anirudh Chandrasekar	(Chinese Taipei) Chen Ti (Chinese Taipei) Ray Ho	4–6, 6–7^{(8–10)}
Win	20–25	Mar 2019	M15 Manama, Bahrain	World Tennis Tour	Hard	(Russia) Alexander Igoshin	(Netherlands) Jesper de Jong (Netherlands) Sidane Pontjodikromo	6–7^{(5–7)}, 7–6^{(7–5)}, [10–8]
Loss	20–26	Apr 2019	M25+H Abuja, Nigeria	World Tennis Tour	Hard	(India) Arjun Kadhe	(France) Dan Added (Greece) Michail Pervolarakis	4–6, 4–6
Loss	20–27	May 2019	M25 Santa Margherita di Pula, Italy	World Tennis Tour	Clay	(Turkey) Tuna Altuna	(Peru) Alexander Merino (Argentina) Manuel Peña López	6–3, 4–6, [0–10]
Loss	20–28	Sep 2019	M15 Nanchang, China	World Tennis Tour	Clay	(India) Anirudh Chandrasekar	(Estonia) Vladimir Ivanov (Russia) Yan Sabanin	4–6, 5–7
Win	21–28	Oct 2019	M15 Nanchang, China	World Tennis Tour	Clay	(India) Anirudh Chandrasekar	(Chinese Taipei) Ray Ho (Hong Kong) Yeung Pak-long	7–6^{(7–5)}, 6–4
Loss	21–29	Mar 2021	M15 Lucknow, India	World Tennis Tour	Hard	(India) Vinayak Sharma Kaza	(India) Yuki Bhambri (India) Saketh Myneni	2–6, 3–6
Loss	21–30	Apr 2022	M25 Nottingham, United Kingdom	World Tennis Tour	Hard	(India) Anirudh Chandrasekar	(Belgium) Ruben Bemelmans (Belgium) Joris De Loore	5–7, 5–7
Loss	21–31	Apr 2022	M25 Nottingham, United Kingdom	World Tennis Tour	Hard	(India) Anirudh Chandrasekar	(United Kingdom) Julian Cash (United Kingdom) Henry Patten	1–6, 4–6
Win	22–31	Jun 2022	M25 Arlon, Belgium	World Tennis Tour	Clay	(India) Anirudh Chandrasekar	(Germany) Constantin Frantzen (Germany) Tim Sandkaulen	7–6^{(7–5)}, 6–4
Loss	22–32	Oct 2022	Fairfield, United States	Challenger	Hard	(India) Anirudh Chandrasekar	(United Kingdom) Julian Cash (United Kingdom) Henry Patten	3–6, 1–6
Loss	22–33	Feb 2023	Bangalore, India	Challenger	Hard	(India) Anirudh Chandrasekar	(South Korea) Chung Yun-seong (Chinese Taipei) Hsu Yu-hsiou	6–3, 6–7^{(7–9)}, [9–11]
Win	23–33	Feb 2023	Pune, India	Challenger	Hard	(India) Anirudh Chandrasekar	(Japan) Toshihide Matsui (Japan) Kaito Uesugi	6–1, 4–6, [10–3]
Win	24–33	Mar 2023	Les Franqueses del Vallès, Spain	Challenger	Hard	(India) Anirudh Chandrasekar	(India) Purav Raja (India) Divij Sharan	7–5, 6–1
Loss	24–34	Apr 2023	Split, Croatia	Challenger	Clay	(India) Anirudh Chandrasekar	(France) Sadio Doumbia (France) Fabien Reboul	4–6, 4–6
Win	25–34	Jun 2023	Vicenza, Italy	Challenger	Clay	(India) Anirudh Chandrasekar	(Brazil) Fernando Romboli (Brazil) Marcelo Zormann	6–3, 6–2
Loss	25–35	Jul 2023	Salzburg, Austria	Challenger	Clay	(India) Anirudh Chandrasekar	(Kazakhstan) Andrey Golubev (Ukraine) Denys Molchanov	4–6, 6–7^{(8–10)}
Loss	25–36	Aug 2023	Grodzisk Mazowiecki, Poland	Challenger	Hard	(India) Anirudh Chandrasekar	(France) Théo Arribagé (France) Luca Sanchez	4–6, 4–6
Loss	25–37	Nov 2023	Helsinki, Finland	Challenger	Hard (i)	(India) Jeevan Nedunchezhiyan	(India) Sriram Balaji (Germany) Andre Begemann	2–6, 6–7
Loss	25–38	Nov 2023	Danderyd, Sweden	Challenger	Hard (i)	(India) Jeevan Nedunchezhiyan	(United Kingdom) Julian Cash (Netherlands) Bart Stevens	7–6^{(9–7)}, 4–6, [7–10]
Loss	25–39	Jan 2024	Quimper, France	Challenger	Hard	(India) Anirudh Chandrasekar	(France) Théo Arribagé (France) Luca Sanchez	4–6, 4–6
Loss	25–40	Aug 2024	Bonn, Germany	Challenger	Clay	(India) Jeevan Nedunchezhiyan	(France) Théo Arribagé (Brazil) Orlando Luz	2–6, 4–6
Win	26–40	Feb 2025	Pune, India	Challenger	Hard	(India) Jeevan Nedunchezhiyan	(Australia) Blake Bayldon (Australia) Matthew Romios	3–6, 6–3, [10–0]
Win	27–40	Jun 2025	Poznań, Poland	Challenger	Clay	(Spain) Sergio Martos Gornés	(Romania) Alexandru Jecan (Romania) Bogdan Pavel	2–6, 7–5, [10–8]
Win	28–40	Jul 2026	Bonn, Germany	Challenger	Clay	(India) Ramkumar Ramanathan	(United Kingdom) Scott Duncan (Sweden) Adam Heinonen	7–6^{(7–4)}, 6–3

=== Doubles Highlights ===
WINNER – Doubles ATP Challenger 75 in Vicenza, June 2023.

WINNER – Doubles ATP Challenger 75 in Las Franquesas del Valles, March 2023.

WINNER - Doubles ATP Challenger 100 in Pune, March 2023.

FINALIST - Doubles ATP Challenger 100 in Bangalore, February 2023.

WINNER- Doubles Title at LTA British Tour Event in 2020.

WINNER- Doubles ATP Challenger in Pune, November 2018.

WINNER- Doubles ATP Challenger in Ho Chi Minh City, 2017.

=== Singles: 10 (4–6) ===
Legend ATP Challengers (0–0) ITF Futures/World Tennis Tour (4–6)	Titles by surface Hard (1–4) Clay (3–2) Grass (0–0)

Result	W–L	Date	Tournament	Tier	Surface	Opponent	Score
Loss	0–1	Feb 2011	Cambodia F2, Phnom Penh	Futures	Hard	(Hong Kong) Karan Rastogi	1–6, 3–6
Loss	0–2	Jul 2012	India F10, Coimbatore	Futures	Hard	(South Korea) Jeong Suk-young	2–6, 5–7
Loss	0–3	Sep 2012	Iran F1, Esfahan	Futures	Clay	(India) Sriram Balaji	3–6, 2–6
Loss	0–4	Mar 2013	India F2, Madurai	Futures	Clay	(Romania) Victor Crivoi	1–6, 1–6
Win	1–4	Mar 2015	India F3, Tiruchirappalli	Futures	Clay	(India) Ramkumar Ramanathan	6–3, 6–4
Win	2–4	Mar 2015	India F4, Chennai	Futures	Clay	(Russia) Ivan Gakhov	6–3, 3–6, 7–6^{(8–6)}
Win	3–4	Sep 2015	India F14, Chennai	Futures	Hard	(India) Sidharth Rawat	3–6, 6–4, 6–2
Loss	3–5	Aug 2017	Thailand F6, Nonthaburi	Futures	Hard	(Australia) Jacob Grills	6–7^{(4–7)}, 5–7
Loss	3–6	Mar 2018	India F1, Bhubaneswar	Futures	Hard	(India) Arjun Kadhe	3–6, 2–6
Win	4–6	Mar 2018	India F4, Trivandrum	Futures	Clay	(India) Arjun Kadhe	6–3, 6–3
