= Jamie Mackenzie (tennis) =

German tennis player (born 2008)

- Country (sports): Germany
- Born: 15 January 2008 (age 18) Auckland, New Zealand
- Height: 1.80 m (5 ft 11 in)
- Plays: Right-handed (two-handed backhand)
- Coach: Gero Kretschmer
- Prize money: US $30,446

Singles
- Career record: 0–0 (at ATP Tour level, Grand Slam level, and in Davis Cup)
- Career titles: 0
- Highest ranking: No. 573 (3 August 2026)
- Current ranking: No. 611 (31 August 2026)

Grand Slam singles results
- Australian Open Junior: QF (2026)
- French Open Junior: QF (2026)
- Wimbledon Junior: 3R (2026)
- US Open Junior: SF (2026)

Doubles
- Career record: 0–0 (at ATP Tour level, Grand Slam level, and in Davis Cup)
- Career titles: 0
- Highest ranking: No. 1,186 (3 August 2026)
- Current ranking: No. 1,204 (31 August 2026)

Grand Slam doubles results
- Australian Open Junior: QF (2025)
- French Open Junior: W (2026)
- Wimbledon Junior: 1R (2025, 2026)
- US Open Junior: SF (2025)
- Last updated on: 12 September 2026.

Jamie Mackenzie (born 15 January 2008) is a German tennis player. He has a career-high ATP singles ranking of No. 573 and a doubles ranking of No. 1,186, both achieved on 3 August 2026.

== Junior career ==
Mackenzie is a member of Rochusclub in Düsseldorf. He made his junior grand slam debut at the 2025 Australian Open and was ranked 23rd in the world in the junior rankings prior to the 2025 French Open.

He competed with compatriot Niels McDonald in the boys' doubles at the 2025 Wimbledon Championships where they were third seeds but lost to Jack Secord and Yannik Álvarez.

Mackenzie reached the semi-finals of the boys' doubles at the 2025 US Open alongside Dominick Mosejczuk, where they lost to seventh seeds Noah Johnston and Benjamin Willwerth.

Competing at the 2026 Australian Open in January, the German reached the quarter-finals of a junior major singles tournament for the first time in his career, and having not dropped a set. In the quarterfinals, he lost to third seed Ryo Tabata. In June, MacKenzie won the boys' doubles title at the French Open, playing alongside compatriot Vincent Reisach. At the 2026 US Open he reached the quarterfinals of the boys' singles before losing to Marcel Latak of the United States.

Mackenzie had successful results on the ITF junior circuit, maintaining a 150–64 singles win-loss record. He reached an ITF junior combined ranking of world No. 2 on 8 June 2026.

== Professional career ==
He became the third player born in 2008 to earn a win on the ATP Challenger Tour in Bonn at the age of 17 years-old when he defeated Matheus Pucinelli De Almeida in straight sets in August 2025.

== Personal life ==
Mackenzie lived in Auckland, New Zealand, prior to relocating to Germany at the age of 12 years-old. He has the nickname 'The Red Rocket', given to him by his mother as a child when he won a cross-country race.

== ATP Challenger Tour finals ==
=== Singles: 1 (runner-up) ===
Legend ATP Challenger (0–1)	Finals by surface Clay (0–1)

Result	W–L	Date	Tournament	Surface	Opponent	Score
Loss	0–1	Aug 2026	Bonn Open, Germany	Clay	(United Kingdom) Jan Choinski	3–6, 2–6

== ITF World Tennis Tour finals ==
=== Doubles: 1 (runner-up) ===
Legend ITF World Tennis (0–1)	Finals by surface Clay (0–1)

Result	W–L	Date	Tournament	Surface	Partner	Opponents	Score
Loss	0–1	Jul 2026	M25 Metzingen, Germany	Clay	(Poland) Tomasz Berkieta	(Czech Republic) Dominik Reček (Czech Republic) Daniel Siniakov	5–7, 6–3, [7–10]

== Junior Grand Slam finals ==
=== Doubles: 1 (title) ===
Result	Year	Tournament	Surface	Partner	Opponents	Score
Win	2026	French Open	Clay	(Germany) Vincent Reisach	(France) Mathys Domenc (France) Daniel Jade	6–1, 6–4
