= Bonn Open =

- 2024 Bonn Open

ATP Challenger Tour
- Location: Bonn, Germany
- Category: ATP Challenger Tour
- Surface: Clay

The Bonn Open is a professional tennis tournament played on clay courts. It is currently part of the ATP Challenger Tour. It was first held in Bonn, Germany in 2024.

== Past finals ==
=== Singles ===
Year	Champion	Runner-up	Score
2026	(United Kingdom) Jan Choinski	(Germany) Jamie Mackenzie	6–3, 6–2
2025	(Austria) Jurij Rodionov	(Kazakhstan) Timofey Skatov	3–6, 6–2, 6–4
2024	(Bolivia) Hugo Dellien	(Germany) Maximilian Marterer	7–6^{(7–2)}, 6–0

=== Doubles ===
Year	Champions	Runners-up	Score
2026	(India) Vijay Sundar Prashanth (India) Ramkumar Ramanathan	(United Kingdom) Scott Duncan (Sweden) Adam Heinonen	7–6^{(7–4)}, 6–3
2025	(Austria) Neil Oberleitner (Netherlands) Mick Veldheer	(Germany) Tim Rühl (Germany) Patrick Zahraj	4–6, 7–6^{(7–3)}, [12–10]
2024	(France) Théo Arribagé (Brazil) Orlando Luz	(India) Jeevan Nedunchezhiyan (India) Vijay Sundar Prashanth	6–2, 6–4
