= Bad Waltersdorf Trophy =

Layjet Open
- 2025 Layjet Open

ATP Challenger Tour
- Event name: Layjet Open
- Location: Bad Waltersdorf, Austria
- Category: ATP Challenger Tour 125
- Surface: Clay
- Website: Website

The Layjet Open by Kronen Zeitung (previously the Bad Waltersdorf Trophy) is a professional tennis tournament played on clay courts. It is currently part of the ATP Challenger Tour. It was first held in Bad Waltersdorf, Austria in 2023.

== Past finals ==
=== Singles ===
Year	Champion	Runner-up	Score
2025	(United Kingdom) Jan Choinski	(Czech Republic) Vít Kopřiva	7–5, 6–4
2024	(Spain) Jaume Munar	(Brazil) Thiago Seyboth Wild	6–2, 6–1
2023	(Italy) Andrea Pellegrino	(Austria) Dennis Novak	1–6, 7–6^{(7–5)}, 6–3

=== Doubles ===
Year	Champions	Runners-up	Score
2025	(Austria) David Pichler (Croatia) Nino Serdarušić	(Czech Republic) Jiří Barnat (Czech Republic) Filip Duda	6–3, 6–3
2024	(Czech Republic) Petr Nouza (Czech Republic) Patrik Rikl	(Argentina) Guido Andreozzi (India) Sriram Balaji	6–4, 4–6, [10–5]
2023	(Germany) Constantin Frantzen (Germany) Hendrik Jebens	(Italy) Marco Bortolotti (Italy) Francesco Passaro	6–1, 6–2
