= Mick Veldheer =

Dutch tennis player (born 1996)

- Country (sports): Netherlands
- Residence: Austria
- Born: 5 April 1996 (age 29) Dirksland, Netherlands
- Height: 1.85 m (6 ft 1 in)
- Plays: Left-handed (two-handed backhand)
- Prize money: $150,904

Singles
- Career record: 0–0
- Career titles: 1 ITF
- Highest ranking: No. 509 (24 August 2020)

Doubles
- Career record: 0–0
- Career titles: 5 Challenger, 11 ITF
- Highest ranking: No. 90 (22 September 2025)
- Current ranking: No. 115 (2 February 2026)
- Last updated on: 4 February 2026.

Mick Veldheer (born 5 April 1996) is a Dutch tennis player who specializes in doubles. He has a career high ATP doubles ranking of world No. 90 achieved on 22 September 2025. Veldheer has won five ATP Challenger doubles titles. He also has a career high ATP singles ranking of No. 509 achieved on 24 August 2020.

== Career ==
Veldheer has won five ATP Challenger doubles titles: three with Filip Bergevi, at the 2023 Keio Challenger, at the 2024 Open de Oeiras and at the 2024 HPP Open, one with Neil Oberleitner at the 2025 Bonn Open and one with Szymon Walków at the 2025 Genoa Open 125 Challenger.
