= Jan Choinski =

British tennis player (born 1996)

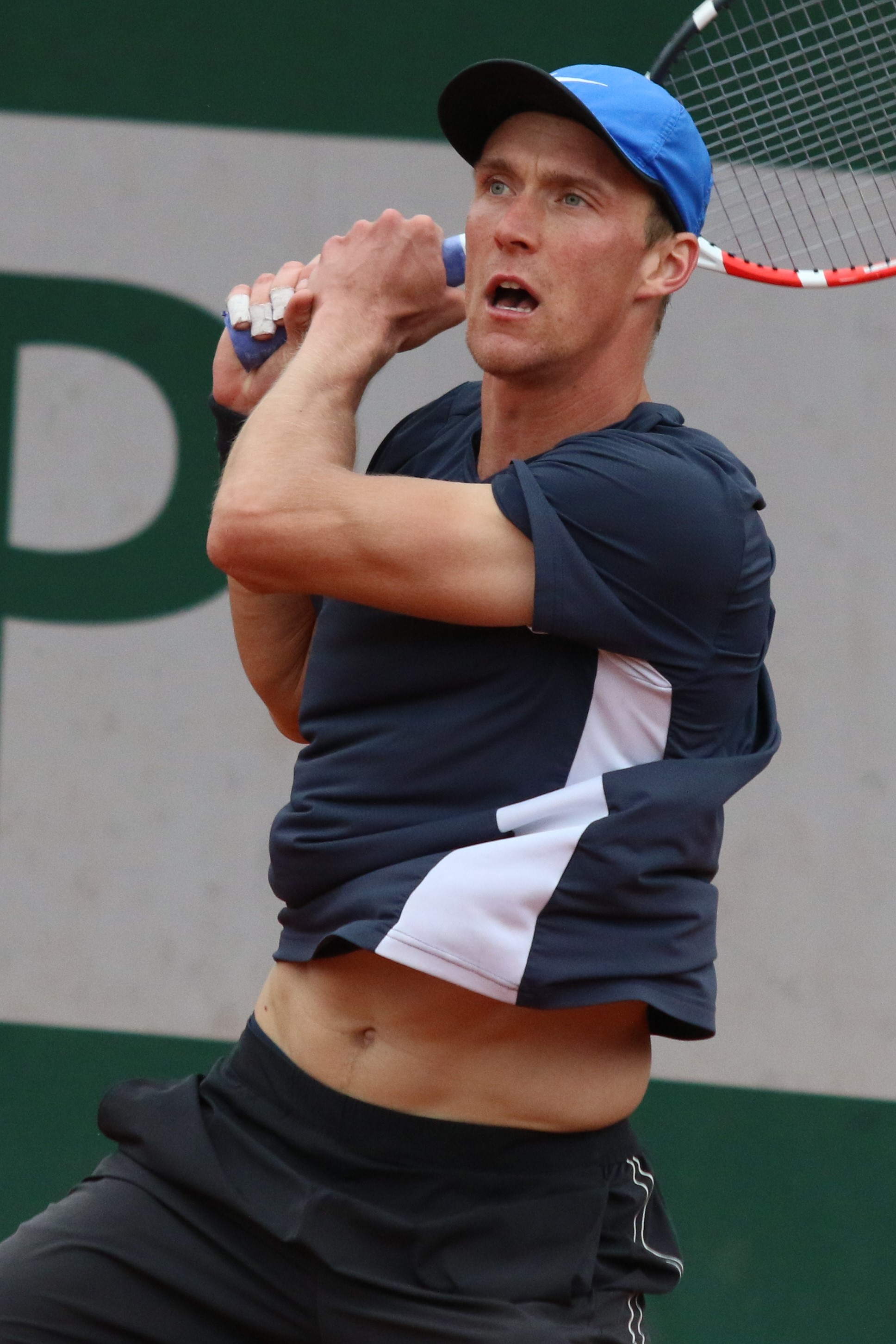
- Choinski at the 2023 French Open
- Country (sports): (United Kingdom) Great Britain (2019–); Germany (2011–18)
- Residence: Münstermaifeld, Germany, Dubai, United Arab Emirates
- Born: 10 June 1996 (age 30) Koblenz, Germany
- Height: 1.96 m (6 ft 5 in)
- Turned pro: 2014
- Plays: Right-handed (two-handed backhand)
- Coach: Andrzej Choinski, Günter Bresnik
- Prize money: US $1,666,443

Singles
- Career record: 5–18 (at ATP Tour level, Grand Slam level, and in Davis Cup)
- Career titles: 0
- Highest ranking: No. 74 (14 September 2026)
- Current ranking: No. 89 (21 September 2026)

Grand Slam singles results
- Australian Open: Q1 (2024, 2025, 2026)
- French Open: Q2 (2018, 2023, 2026)
- Wimbledon: 2R (2023, 2026)
- US Open: 1R (2024, 2026)

Doubles
- Career record: 1–1
- Career titles: 0
- Highest ranking: No. 571 (21 September 2026)
- Current ranking: No. 571 (21 September 2026)

Grand Slam doubles results
- US Open: 2R (2026)
- Last updated on: 21 September 2026.

Jan Choinski (Polish: Choiński; born 10 June 1996 in Germany) is a British tennis player who competes mainly on the ATP Challenger Tour. Choinski has a career high ATP singles ranking of world No. 74 achieved on 14 September 2026 and a doubles ranking of No. 571 achieved on 21 September 2026.

== Career ==
=== 2014: US Open Junior doubles semifinals, Turned Pro ===
Choinski reached the semifinals of the 2014 US Open – Boys' singles. He peaked at No. 17 combined world ranking, compiling a 78–30 match record in singles.

=== 2016: ATP debut ===
Choinski made his ATP main draw debut at the 2016 MercedesCup, where he was given a wildcard in singles.

=== 2022: Maiden Challenger title ===
Ranked No. 457, he reached his second Challenger final at the 2022 Campeonato Internacional de Tênis de Campinas being the first qualifier in the history of the tournament to do so. He won his maiden Challenger title defeating Juan Pablo Varillas, moving more than a 150 positions back up close to the top 300 at No. 301 on 10 October 2022. He reached the top 250 on 19 December 2022.

=== 2023: Wimbledon debut ===
Choinski was awarded a wildcard for his Grand Slam main draw debut at the 2023 Wimbledon Championships where he won his first Major match against Dušan Lajović before losing in the second round to 17th seed Hubert Hurkacz.

=== 2024: Consecutive Wimbledon wildcard, US Open debut ===
Ranked No. 188 he qualified for the Estoril Open and defeated wildcard João Fonseca, recording his first ATP win outside the Majors.

For a second consecutive year, he received a wildcard for the Wimbledon but lost in the first round to Luciano Darderi in five sets.

He won the Elesse Pro Tennis Challenge in Wyomissing, Berks County, Pennsylvania, defeating No. 220 ranked Canadian Alexis Galarneau.

Ranked No. 280, he qualified for the main draw of the US Open after saving three match points against American Maxime Cressy to make his debut at this Major. Choinski lost in the first round to Roberto Carballés Baena in five sets.

In September, Choinski won his third career Challenger title at the NÖ Open in Tulln, Austria, defeating Lukas Neumayer in the final.

=== 2025-2026: First ATP quarterfinal, top 100 ===
In July 2025, Choinski won his fourth Challenger title in Troyes, defeating Calvin Hemery in the final in three sets. His fifth Challenger title came just two weeks later when he defeated Kimmer Coppejans in the final at the Dutch Open.

In September 2025 , Choinski defeated Vít Kopřiva in the final at the Layjet Open in Austria and the following month at the Copa Faulcombridge in Valencia, Spain, he won his fourth Challenger title of the year, defeating Luka Mikrut in the final.

As top seed, Choinski claimed the eighth Challenger title of his career at the 2026 Zagreb Open, overcoming Zsombor Piros in the final.

Choinski reached the top 100 in the singles rankings on 29 June 2026, following his first career quarterfinal showing at the 2026 Eastbourne Open, becoming the first British male qualifier to reach the singles quarterfinals at the event. He defeated fellow compatriot and lucky loser Felix Gill who replaced top seed Taylor Fritz directly in the second round.

== Personal life ==
Choinski was born in Koblenz, Germany. He stated, "My mum's side of [the] family is fully British [and] my dad is from Poland." Both ballet dancers, his parents met while under contract in Germany, where they would later open a ballet school. His mother is from Southampton.

He represented Germany from the beginning of his career until the end of 2018. Since 2019, he switched nationality and represents Great Britain.

== Performance timeline ==
Key
W	F	SF	QF	#R	RR	Q#	DNQ	A	NH

(W) winner; (F) finalist; (SF) semifinalist; (QF) quarterfinalist; (#R) rounds 4, 3, 2, 1; (RR) round-robin stage; (Q#) qualification round; (DNQ) did not qualify; (A) absent; (NH) not held; (SR) strike rate (events won / competed); (W–L) win–loss record.
To avoid confusion and double counting, these charts are updated at the conclusion of a tournament or when the player's participation has ended.

=== Singles ===
	Germany			Great Britain										
Tournament	2016	2017	2018	2019	2020	2021	2022	2023	2024	2025	2026	SR	W–L	Win%
Grand Slam tournaments
Australian Open	A	A	A	A	A	A	A	A	Q1	Q1	Q1	0 / 0	0–0	–
French Open	A	A	Q2	A	A	A	A	Q2	Q1	Q1	Q2	0 / 0	0–0	–
Wimbledon	A	A	A	Q1	NH	A	A	2R	1R	Q1	2R	0 / 3	2–3	40%
US Open	A	A	A	A	A	A	A	Q1	1R	Q1		0 / 1	0–1	0%
Overall win–loss	0–0	0–0	0–0	0–0	0–0	0–0	0–0	1–1	0–2	0–0	0–1	0 / 4	1–4	20%
ATP Masters 1000
Indian Wells Masters	A	A	A	A	NH	A	A	A	A	A		0 / 0	0–0	–
Miami Open	A	A	A	A	NH	A	A	A	A	A		0 / 0	0–0	–
Monte Carlo Masters	A	A	A	A	NH	A	A	A	A	A		0 / 0	0–0	–
Madrid Open	A	A	A	A	NH	A	A	Q1	A	A		0 / 0	0-0	–
Italian Open	A	A	A	A	A	A	Q2	A	A	A		0 / 0	0–0	–
Canadian Open	A	A	A	A	NH	A	A	A	A	A		0 / 0	0–0	–
Cincinnati Masters	A	A	A	A	A	A	A	A	A	A		0 / 0	0–0	–
Shanghai Masters	A	A	A	A	NH			A	A	A		0 / 0	0–0	–
Paris Masters	A	A	A	A	A	A	A	A	A	A		0 / 0	0–0	–
Win–loss	0–0	0–0	0–0	0–0	0–0	0–0	0–0	0–0	0–0	0–0	0–0	0 / 0	0–0	–
Career statistics
Tournaments	1	0	0	0	0	0	0	4	3	1	5	14		
Overall win–loss	0–1	0–0	0–0	0–0	0–0	0–0	0–0	1–4	1–3	0–1	3–5	5–14		
Year-end ranking	606	296	292	264	347	602	248	160	173	125				

== ATP Challenger Tour finals ==
=== Singles: 11 (10–1) ===
Result	W–L	Date	Tournament	Surface	Opponent	Score
Loss	0–1	Aug 2018	Meerbusch, Germany	Clay	(Slovakia) Filip Horanský	7–6^{(9–7)}, 3–6, 3–6
Win	1–1	Oct 2022	Campinas, Brazil	Clay	(Peru) Juan Pablo Varillas	6–4, 6–4
Win	2–1	Aug 2023	Meerbusch, Germany	Clay	(Argentina) Camilo Ugo Carabelli	6–4, 6–0
Win	3–1	Sep 2024	Tulln, Austria	Clay	(Austria) Lukas Neumayer	6–4, 6–1
Win	4–1	Jun 2025	Troyes, France	Clay	(France) Calvin Hemery	6–4, 6–7^{(4–7)}, 6–2
Win	5–1	Jul 2025	Amersfoort, Netherlands	Clay	(Belgium) Kimmer Coppejans	6–4, 3–6, 6–3
Win	6–1	Sep 2025	Layjet Open, Austria	Clay	(Czech Republic) Vít Kopřiva	7–5, 6–4
Win	7–1	Oct 2025	Valencia, Spain	Clay	(Croatia) Luka Mikrut	4–6, 6–1, 6–2
Win	8–1	May 2026	Zagreb, Croatia	Clay	(Hungary) Zsombor Piros	7–6^{(7–5)}, 7–6^{(7–2)}
Win	9–1	Jul 2026	Braunschweig, Germany	Clay	(France) Hugo Gaston	4–6, 6–0, 6–4
Win	10–1	Jul 2026	Bonn, Germany	Clay	(Germany) Jamie Mackenzie	6–3, 6–2

=== Doubles: 1 (0–1) ===
Result	W–L	Date	Tournament	Surface	Partner	Opponents	Score
Loss	0–1	Jan 2023	Nonthaburi, Thailand	Hard	(United Kingdom) Stuart Parker	(South Korea) Nam Ji-sung (South Korea) Song Min-kyu	4–6, 4–6

== ITF Tour finals ==
=== Singles: 20 (11–9) ===
Result	W–L	Date	Tournament	Surface	Opponent	Score
Loss	0–1	Aug 2014	Germany F12, Karlsruhe	Clay	(Germany) Yannick Hanfmann	5–7, 1–6
Win	1–1	Aug 2014	Belgium F12, Huy	Clay	(Belgium) Julien Cagnina	3–6, 6–4, 7–6^{(7–3)}
Loss	1–2	Jul 2015	Germany F8, Trier	Clay	(Austria) Maximilian Neuchrist	7–6^{(7–5)}, 4–6, 3–6
Loss	1–3	Aug 2015	Germany F10, Wetzlar	Clay	(Bolivia) Hugo Dellien	3–6, 3–6
Win	2–3	Oct 2015	France F20, Forbach	Carpet (i)	(France) Ugo Humbert	6–3, 7–6^{(7–2)}
Loss	2–4	Oct 2015	Germany F15, Leimen	Hard (i)	(Germany) Mats Moraing	4–6, 6–3, 2–6
Loss	2–5	Feb 2016	Switzerland F1, Oberentfelden	Carpet (i)	(Belarus) Uladzimir Ignatik	4–6, 3–6
Loss	2–6	Sep 2016	USA F29, Irvine	Hard	(United States) Mackenzie McDonald	0–6, 3–6
Win	3–6	May 2017	Sweden F1, Karlskrona	Clay	(Bolivia) Hugo Dellien	7–5, 4–6, 6–2
Loss	3–7	Jul 2017	Germany F8, Kassel	Clay	(Estonia) Jürgen Zopp	3–6, 2–6
Win	4–7	Aug 2017	Germany F9, Essen	Clay	(Brazil) Daniel Dutra da Silva	6–4, 7–6^{(7–5)}
Win	5–7	Aug 2017	Germany F10, Wetzlar	Clay	(Germany) Elmar Ejupovic	7–5, 7–6^{(7–1)}
Win	6–7	Aug 2017	Germany F11, Karlsruhe	Clay	(Hungary) Máté Valkusz	6–2, 6–4
Loss	6–8	Mar 2018	USA F7, Bakersfield	Hard	(France) Mathias Bourgue	2–6, 3–6
Win	7–8	Aug 2018	Germany F11, Trier	Clay	(Germany) Benjamin Hassan	6–4, 3–6, 6–3
Win	8–8	Aug 2018	Belgium F9, Huy	Clay	(Northern Mariana Islands) Colin Sinclair	3–6, 7–6^{(7–0)}, 6–3
Win	9–8	Oct 2019	M15 Bad Salzdetfurth, Germany	Clay	(Germany) Stefan Seifert	6–3, 6–1
Loss	9–9	Dec 2019	M15 Santo Domingo, Dominican Rep.	Hard	(Germany) Daniel Altmaier	3–6, 6–4, 4–6
Win	10–9	Dec 2019	M15 Santo Domingo, Dominican Rep.	Hard	(Argentina) Camilo Ugo Carabelli	6–0, 6–0
Win	11–9	Aug 2022	M15 Frankfurt, Germany	Clay	(Spain) Imanol López Morillo	6–3, 7–6^{(7–4)}

=== Doubles: 7 (3–4) ===
Result	W–L	Date	Tournament	Surface	Partner	Opponents	Score
Loss	0–1	Feb 2015	Turkey F4, Antalya	Hard	(Germany) Kevin Krawietz	(China) Li Zhe (South Africa) Ruan Roelofse	3–6, 6–4, [2–10]
Win	1–1	May 2016	Czech Republic F3, Jablonec	Clay	(Germany) Tom Schönenberg	(Poland) Hubert Hurkacz (Poland) Szymon Walków	6–2, 7–6^{(9–7)}
Win	2–1	Jun 2017	Czech Republic F3, Jablonec	Clay	(Poland) Kamil Majchrzak	(Czech Republic) Petr Michnev (Czech Republic) Matěj Vocel	7–6^{(7–4)}, 6–3
Loss	2–2	Oct 2019	M15 Bad Salzdetfurth, Germany	Carpet	(Germany) Daniel Altmaier	(Germany) Lasse Muscheites (Germany) Stefan Seifert	6–2, 3–6, [9–11]
Win	3–2	Nov 2019	M15 Sarreguemines, France	Carpet	(Germany) Luca Gelhardt	(France) Arthur Bouquier (France) Louis Dussin	6–3, 6–4
Loss	3–3	Dec 2019	M15 Santo Domingo, Dominican Rep.	Hard	(France) Maxime Mora	(Peru) Arklon Huertas del Pino (Argentina) Camilo Ugo Carabelli	6–7^{(2–7)}, 3–6
Loss	3–4	May 2022	M15 Nottingham, United Kingdom	Hard	(United Kingdom) Charles Broom	(United Kingdom) Julian Cash (United Kingdom) Henry Patten	6–7^{(5–7)}, 2–6
