= 2024 Tennis Open Karlsruhe – Doubles =

Doubles
- 2024 Tennis Open Karlsruhe

Final
- Champions: (Germany) Jakob Schnaitter (Germany) Mark Wallner
- Runners-up: (France) Dan Added (France) Grégoire Jacq
- Score: 6–4, 6–0

Events
Singles	Doubles
← 2023 ·	Tennis Open Karlsruhe	· 2025 →

Neil Oberleitner and Tim Sandkaulen were the defending champions but chose not to defend their title.

Jakob Schnaitter and Mark Wallner won the title after defeating Dan Added and Grégoire Jacq 6–4, 6–0 in the final.

== Seeds ==
1. (Germany) Jakob Schnaitter / (Germany) Mark Wallner (champions)
2. (France) Dan Added / (France) Grégoire Jacq (final)
3. Ivan Liutarevich / (Spain) Sergio Martos Gornés (first round)
4. (India) Jeevan Nedunchezhiyan / (India) Vijay Sundar Prashanth (first round)

== Draw ==
=== Key ===
- Q = Qualifier
- WC = Wild card
- LL = Lucky loser
- Alt = Alternate
- ITF = ITF entry
- PR = Protected ranking
- SR = Special ranking
- SE = Special exempt
- JE = Junior exempt
- JR = Junior Accelerator Programme entrant
- CO = College Accelerator Programme entrant
- NG = Next Gen Accelerator Program entrant
- w/o = Walkover
- r = Retired
- d = Defaulted

=== Draw ===
First round
1	(Germany) J Schnaitter (Germany) M Wallner	7	7^{7}
(Belgium) J De Loore (Germany) D Masur	5	6^{1}
(Czech Republic) Jiří Barnat (Czech Republic) R Jebavý	7	7
(Slovakia) J Kovalík (Slovakia) I Zelenay	5	5
4	(India) J Nedunchezhiyan (India) VS Prashanth	4	5
(Uruguay) I Carou (Argentina) M Kestelboim	6	7
WC	(Germany) T Rühl (Germany) P Zahraj	6	4	[7]
(Venezuela) G Oliveira (Argentina) S Rodríguez Taverna	3	6	[10]
(Israel) D Cukierman (Brazil) D Dutra da Silva	6	6
WC	(Germany) J Engel (Germany) Lasse Pörtner	4	2
(Spain) D Rincón (Spain) N Sánchez Izquierdo	7^{7}	6
3	I Liutarevich (Spain) S Martos Gornés	6^{2}	4
(Germany) R Molleker (Kazakhstan) D Yevseyev	2	7^{7}	[10]
(United States) T Kodat (Latvia) R Strombachs	6	6^{5}	[5]
(Belgium) T Colson (Germany) Niklas Schell	4	5
2	(France) D Added (France) G Jacq	6	7

Quarterfinals
1	(Germany) J Schnaitter (Germany) M Wallner	3	6	[10]
(Czech Republic) J Barnat (Czech Republic) R Jebavý	6	3	[3]
(Uruguay) I Carou (Argentina) M Kestelboim	6	7^{8}
(Venezuela) G Oliveira (Argentina) S Rodríguez Taverna	2	6^{6}
(Israel) D Cukierman (Brazil) D Dutra da Silva	6	6
(Spain) D Rincón (Spain) N Sánchez Izquierdo	3	3
(Germany) R Molleker (Kazakhstan) D Yevseyev	7^{8}	3	[5]
2	(France) D Added (France) G Jacq	6^{6}	6	[10]

Semifinals
1	(Germany) J Schnaitter (Germany) M Wallner	6	6
(Uruguay) I Carou (Argentina) M Kestelboim	1	4
(Israel) D Cukierman (Brazil) D Dutra da Silva	6^{6}	6	[7]
2	(France) D Added (France) G Jacq	7^{8}	4	[10]

Final
1	(Germany) J Schnaitter (Germany) M Wallner	6	6
2	(France) D Added (France) G Jacq	4	0
