= 2026 Hamburg Ladies & Gents Cup – Men's singles =

Men's singles
- 2026 Hamburg Ladies & Gents Cup

Final
- Champion: (Czech Republic) Jan Kumstát
- Runner-up: (Germany) Marvin Möller
- Score: 4–6, 7–6^{(7–5)}, 7–5

Events
Singles	men	women
Doubles	men	women
- Hamburg Ladies & Gents Cup

Justin Engel was the defending champion but chose not to defend his title.

Jan Kumstát won the title after defeating Marvin Möller 4–6, 7–6^{(7–5)}, 7–5 in the final.

== Seeds ==
1. (Hungary) Zsombor Piros (first round, retired)
2. (Spain) Max Alcalá Gurri (first round)
3. (Denmark) Elmer Møller (first round)
4. (Germany) Tom Gentzsch (withdrew)
5. (Ukraine) Vitaliy Sachko (second round)
6. (Germany) Diego Dedura (first round)
7. (India) Sumit Nagal (first round)
8. (Italy) Raúl Brancaccio (second round)

== Draw ==
Key

- Q = Qualifier
- WC = Wild card
- LL = Lucky loser
- Alt = Alternate
- ITF = ITF entry
- PR = Protected ranking
- SR = Special ranking
- SE = Special exempt
- JE = Junior exempt
- JR = Junior Accelerator Programme entrant
- CO = College Accelerator Programme entrant
- NG = Next Gen Accelerator Program entrant
- w/o = Walkover
- r = Retired
- d = Defaulted

=== Finals ===
Semifinals
(Brazil) Matheus Pucinelli de Almeida	4	7	2
Q	(Czech Republic) Jan Kumstát	6	5	6
(Croatia) Matej Dodig	2	4
Alt	(Germany) Marvin Möller	6	6

Final
Q	(Czech Republic) Jan Kumstát	4	7^{7}	7
Alt	(Germany) Marvin Möller	6	6^{5}	5

=== Top half ===
First round
1	(Hungary) Z Piros	6	0	0^{r}
Alt	(Germany) M Schönhaus	1	6	0
(Brazil) M Pucinelli de Almeida	7^{7}	3	7
(Germany) F Broska	6^{1}	6	5
Q	(Ukraine) O Krutykh	3	6^{4}
CO	(Switzerland) D Dietrich	6	7^{7}
(Chinese Taipei) C-h Tseng	7	1	4
5	(Ukraine) V Sachko	5	6	6
Q	(Turkey) E Kırkın	6	4	4
(Bosnia and Herzegovina) A Nedić	3	6	6
Q	(Sweden) O Wallin	7	2	3
(Spain) C Taberner	5	6	6
WC	(Germany) J Mackenzie	7^{7}	3	3
Q	(Czech Republic) J Kumstát	6^{5}	6	6
(Netherlands) M Houkes	7	6
7	(India) S Nagal	5	2

Second round
Alt	(Germany) M Schönhaus	1	3
(Brazil) M Pucinelli de Almeida	6	6
CO	(Switzerland) D Dietrich	7^{8}	7^{7}
5	(Ukraine) V Sachko	6^{6}	6^{5}
(Bosnia and Herzegovina) A Nedić	7^{7}	4	0^{r}
(Spain) C Taberner	6^{5}	6	3
Q	(Czech Republic) J Kumstát	6	7^{7}
(Netherlands) M Houkes	4	6^{4}

Quarterfinals
(Brazil) M Pucinelli de Almeida	4	6	6
CO	(Switzerland) D Dietrich	6	3	4
(Spain) C Taberner	5	0^{r}
Q	(Czech Republic) J Kumstát	7	0

Semifinals
(Brazil) M Pucinelli de Almeida	4	7	2
Q	(Czech Republic) J Kumstát	6	5	6

=== Bottom half ===
First round
6	(Germany) D Dedura	1	4
PR	(Germany) MH Rehberg	6	6
Q	(Poland) Fryderyk Lechno-Wasiutyński	4	5
LL	(Georgia (country)) S Purtseladze	6	7
Q	(Kazakhstan) D Yevseyev	3	1
(Croatia) M Dodig	6	6
WC	(Germany) R Molleker	6	6
3	(Denmark) E Møller	1	3
8	(Italy) R Brancaccio	6	6
(Romania) FC Jianu	3	3
(Romania) C Crețu	1	7	4
Alt	(Germany) M Möller	6	5	6
WC	(Germany) Mika Petkovic	6	4	3
JR	(Germany) N McDonald	0	6	6
Alt	(Brazil) E Ribeiro	6	6
2	(Spain) M Alcalá Gurri	4	4

Second round
PR	(Germany) MH Rehberg	1	7	5
LL	(Georgia (country)) S Purtseladze	6	5	7
(Croatia) M Dodig	6	6
WC	(Germany) R Molleker	4	3
8	(Italy) R Brancaccio	7	6^{5}	6^{4}
Alt	(Germany) M Möller	5	7^{7}	7^{7}
JR	(Germany) N McDonald	4	6	6
Alt	(Brazil) E Ribeiro	6	3	4

Quarterfinals
LL	(Georgia (country)) S Purtseladze	2^{r}
(Croatia) M Dodig	2
Alt	(Germany) M Möller	6	6
JR	(Germany) N McDonald	4	0

Semifinals
(Croatia) M Dodig	2	4
Alt	(Germany) M Möller	6	6
