= 2025 Hamburg Ladies & Gents Cup – Women's singles =

Women's singles
- 2025 Hamburg Ladies & Gents Cup

Final
- Champion: Erika Andreeva
- Runner-up: (Spain) Kaitlin Quevedo
- Score: 6–4, 6–2

Events
Singles	men	women
Doubles	men	women
← 2024 ·	Hamburg Ladies & Gents Cup	· 2026 →

Erika Andreeva won the title, defeating Kaitlin Quevedo in the final, 6–4, 6–2.

Mona Barthel was the defending champion, but withdrew from her quarterfinal match against Andreeva.

== Seeds ==
1. (Spain) Kaitlin Quevedo (final)
2. (Germany) Mona Barthel (quarterfinals, withdrew)
3. (Germany) Katharina Hobgarski (first round)
4. (Germany) Tessa Brockmann (quarterfinals)
5. (Croatia) Lea Bošković (quarterfinals)
6. Erika Andreeva (champion)
7. (Poland) Martyna Kubka (quarterfinals)
8. (Germany) Antonia Schmidt (first round)

== Draw ==
=== Key ===
- Q = Qualifier
- WC = Wild card
- LL = Lucky loser
- Alt = Alternate
- ITF = ITF entry
- PR = Protected ranking
- SR = Special ranking
- SE = Special exempt
- JE = Junior exempt
- JR = Junior Accelerator Programme entrant
- CO = College Accelerator Programme entrant
- NG = Next Gen Accelerator Program entrant
- w/o = Walkover
- r = Retired
- d = Defaulted

=== Finals ===
Semifinals
1	(Spain) Kaitlin Quevedo	3	6	7
(Netherlands) Anouck Vrancken Peeters	6	3	5
(Turkey) Berfu Cengiz	6^{3}	2
6	Erika Andreeva	7^{7}	6

Final
1	(Spain) Kaitlin Quevedo	4	2
6	Erika Andreeva	6	6

=== Top half ===
First round
1	(Spain) K Quevedo	6	6
(United States) A Blokhina	4	3
(Greece) S Sakellaridi	1	3
Q	(Belgium) T Gadamauri	6	6
Q	(Germany) M Guth	6	6
SR	(Denmark) S Samavati	0	2
Q	(Netherlands) M Hageman	3	1
5	(Croatia) L Bošković	6	6
3	(Germany) K Hobgarski	2	1
(United States) J Adams	6	6
(Netherlands) A Vrancken Peeters	0	7	6
WC	(Germany) E Bennemann	6	5	4
(Poland) M Stankiewicz	6	6
Q	(Ukraine) A Burchak	1	3
WC	(Germany) S Triquart	2	3
7	(Poland) M Kubka	6	6

Second round
1	(Spain) K Quevedo	7	6
Q	(Belgium) T Gadamauri	5	2
Q	(Germany) M Guth	4	2
5	(Croatia) L Bošković	6	6
(United States) J Adams	5	3
(Netherlands) A Vrancken Peeters	7	6
(Poland) M Stankiewicz	7	1	2
7	(Poland) M Kubka	5	6	6

Quarterfinals
1	(Spain) K Quevedo	7^{8}	7
5	(Croatia) L Bošković	6^{6}	5
(Netherlands) A Vrancken Peeters	5	6	7^{7}
7	(Poland) M Kubka	7	4	6^{4}

Semifinals
1	(Spain) K Quevedo	3	6	7
(Netherlands) A Vrancken Peeters	6	3	5

=== Bottom half ===
First round
8	(Germany) A Schmidt	0	3
(Turkey) B Cengiz	6	6
(Germany) M Hodzic	6	6
(Belgium) A Van Impe	2	2
(Greece) V Grammatikopoulou	3	6	6
Q	(Switzerland) C Fontenel	6	2	4
WC	(Germany) A Petkovic	2	6^{4}
4	(Germany) T Brockmann	6	7^{7}
6	E Andreeva	6	6
WC	(Germany) S Zhenikhova	4	1
(Italy) L Mair	5	3
Q	(Poland) Z Kolonus	7	6
(Germany) V Steiner	6	6
Q	(Germany) J Silva	0	1
Q	(Czech Republic) A Suchá	5	6^{4}
2	(Germany) M Barthel	7	7^{7}

Second round
(Turkey) B Cengiz	6	6
(Germany) M Hodzic	3	4
(Greece) V Grammatikopoulou	7^{7}	2	0
4	(Germany) T Brockmann	6^{3}	6	6
6	E Andreeva	6	6
Q	(Poland) Z Kolonus	2	3
(Germany) V Steiner	1	3
2	(Germany) M Barthel	6	6

Quarterfinals
(Turkey) B Cengiz	6	6
4	(Germany) T Brockmann	3	2
6	E Andreeva	w/o
2	(Germany) M Barthel

Semifinals
(Turkey) B Cengiz	6^{3}	2
6	E Andreeva	7^{7}	6
