= 2025 Hamburg Ladies & Gents Cup – Men's singles =

Men's singles
- 2025 Hamburg Ladies & Gents Cup

Final
- Champion: (Germany) Justin Engel
- Runner-up: (Italy) Federico Cinà
- Score: 7–5, 7–6^{(7–4)}

Events
Singles	men	women
Doubles	men	women
- Hamburg Ladies & Gents Cup

Henri Squire was the defending champion but lost in the quarterfinals to George Loffhagen.

Justin Engel won the title after defeating Federico Cinà 7–5, 7–6^{(7–4)} in the final. Engel overtook Fonseca as the youngest Challenger winner of 2025, and was the fifth-youngest German champion in Challenger history.

== Seeds ==
1. (Spain) Daniel Mérida (first round)
2. (Luxembourg) Chris Rodesch (second round, retired)
3. (Belgium) Gauthier Onclin (first round)
4. (Germany) Justin Engel (champion)
5. (United Kingdom) George Loffhagen (semifinals)
6. (Italy) Federico Cinà (final)
7. (Spain) Alejandro Moro Cañas (semifinals)
8. (Croatia) Matej Dodig (quarterfinals)

== Draw ==
Key

- Q = Qualifier
- WC = Wild card
- LL = Lucky loser
- Alt = Alternate
- ITF = ITF entry
- PR = Protected ranking
- SR = Special ranking
- SE = Special exempt
- JE = Junior exempt
- JR = Junior Accelerator Programme entrant
- CO = College Accelerator Programme entrant
- NG = Next Gen Accelerator Program entrant
- w/o = Walkover
- r = Retired
- d = Defaulted

=== Finals ===
Semifinals
7	(Spain) Alejandro Moro Cañas	6^{3}	4
4	(Germany) Justin Engel	7^{7}	6
5	(United Kingdom) George Loffhagen	6^{5}	4
6	(Italy) Federico Cinà	7^{7}	6

Final
4	(Germany) Justin Engel	7	7^{7}
6	(Italy) Federico Cinà	5	6^{4}

=== Top half ===
First round
1	(Spain) D Mérida	5	6	6^{3}
(Belgium) M Geerts	7	2	7^{7}
PR	(Bulgaria) A Andreev	3	4
Q	(Belgium) B Gadamauri	6	6
(Germany) C Negritu	4	2
(France) Mathys Erhard	6	6
Q	(Germany) J Opitz	6	6^{3}	2
7	(Spain) A Moro Cañas	4	7^{7}	6
4	(Germany) J Engel	7^{7}	7^{12}
Q	(Netherlands) Sander Jong	6^{4}	6^{10}
PR	(Germany) C-M Stebe	6	6
WC	(Germany) N McDonald	4	4
WC	(Germany) J Mackenzie	6	6
PR	(Italy) F Forti	2	3
(Ivory Coast) E Coulibaly	4	3
8	(Croatia) M Dodig	6	6

Second round
(Belgium) M Geerts	5	3
Q	(Belgium) B Gadamauri	7	6
(France) M Erhard	6^{4}	4
7	(Spain) A Moro Cañas	7^{7}	6
4	(Germany) J Engel	2	6	7^{7}
PR	(Germany) C-M Stebe	6	3	6^{3}
WC	(Germany) J Mackenzie	1	7^{7}	3
8	(Croatia) M Dodig	6	6^{5}	6

Quarterfinals
Q	(Belgium) B Gadamauri	6	3	5
7	(Spain) A Moro Cañas	1	6	7
4	(Germany) J Engel	4	7^{7}	7^{7}
8	(Croatia) M Dodig	6	6^{4}	6^{5}

Semifinals
7	(Spain) A Moro Cañas	6^{3}	4
4	(Germany) J Engel	7^{7}	6

=== Bottom half ===
First round
5	(United Kingdom) G Loffhagen	6^{10}	7	6
(Germany) M Topo	7^{12}	5	1
Q	(Spain) P Vives Marcos	4	1
(Estonia) D Glinka	6	6
(France) M Martineau	6	6
Q	(Germany) M Möller	3	1
(Germany) H Squire	6	6
3	(Belgium) G Onclin	4	0
6	(Italy) F Cinà	7^{7}	5	6
Q	(Slovakia) M Karol	6^{5}	7	4
(Bulgaria) D Kuzmanov	2	6	6
WC	(Germany) Mika Petkovic	6	2	4
NG	(Czech Republic) Petr Brunclík	1	2
(Germany) T Gentzsch	6	6
SE	(Czech Republic) M Mrva	6	6^{3}	4
2	(Luxembourg) C Rodesch	4	7^{7}	6

Second round
5	(United Kingdom) G Loffhagen	w/o
(Estonia) D Glinka
(France) M Martineau	6^{2}	4
(Germany) H Squire	7^{7}	6
6	(Italy) F Cinà	6	6
(Bulgaria) D Kuzmanov	4	1
(Germany) T Gentzsch	5	3
2	(Luxembourg) C Rodesch	7	1^{r}

Quarterfinals
5	(United Kingdom) G Loffhagen	6	7^{7}
(Germany) H Squire	4	6^{5}
6	(Italy) F Cinà	6	6
(Germany) T Gentzsch	2	2

Semifinals
5	(United Kingdom) G Loffhagen	6^{5}	4
6	(Italy) F Cinà	7^{7}	6
