= 2023 Hamburg Ladies & Gents Cup – Women's singles =

Women's singles
- 2023 Hamburg Ladies & Gents Cup

Final
- Champion: Julia Avdeeva
- Runner-up: (Germany) Ella Seidel
- Score: 6–4, 7–6^{(7–2)}

Events
Singles	men	women
Doubles	men	women
← 2022 ·	Hamburg Ladies & Gents Cup	· 2024 →

Rebeka Masarova was the defending champion but chose to compete in Cluj-Napoca instead.

Julia Avdeeva won the title, defeating Ella Seidel in the final, 6–4, 7–6^{(7–2)}.

== Seeds ==
1. (Turkey) Berfu Cengiz (second round)
2. (Germany) Ella Seidel (final)
3. (Belgium) Sofia Costoulas (first round)
4. (Croatia) Lea Bošković (semifinals)
5. (Germany) Mona Barthel (quarterfinals)
6. Julia Avdeeva (champion)
7. (Germany) Julia Middendorf (second round)
8. (Belgium) Alison Van Uytvanck (first round, retired)

== Draw ==
=== Key ===
- Q = Qualifier
- WC = Wild card
- LL = Lucky loser
- Alt = Alternate
- ITF = ITF entry
- PR = Protected ranking
- SR = Special ranking
- SE = Special exempt
- JE = Junior exempt
- JR = Junior Accelerator Programme entrant
- CO = College Accelerator Programme entrant
- NG = Next Gen Accelerator Program entrant
- w/o = Walkover
- r = Retired
- d = Defaulted

=== Finals ===
Semifinals
6	Julia Avdeeva	7^{7}	7
4	(Croatia) Lea Bošković	6^{2}	5
Q	Alevtina Ibragimova	4	2
2	(Germany) Ella Seidel	6	6

Final
6	Julia Avdeeva	6	7^{7}
2	(Germany) Ella Seidel	4	6^{2}

=== Top half ===
First round
1	(Turkey) B Cengiz	7	6
(Czech Republic) T Smitková	5	4
Q	(Israel) V Ekshibarova	0	1
E Maklakova	6	6
(Germany) A Gabric	1	6	6
Q	(Germany) A Klasen	6	2	3
WC	(Germany) TJ Brockmann	1	6^{3}
6	J Avdeeva	6	7^{7}
4	(Croatia) L Bošković	7^{7}	7
(Turkey) A Aksu	6^{5}	5
(Czech Republic) I Šebestová	3	2
Q	(Germany) Y Morderger	6	6
WC	(Belgium) E Vanlangendonck	6	6
(United States) C Scholl	3	3
Q	(Belgium) A Waligora	6	4	0
7	(Germany) J Middendorf	1	6	6

Second round
1	(Turkey) B Cengiz	2	3
E Maklakova	6	6
(Germany) A Gabric	4	6^{7}
6	J Avdeeva	6	7^{9}
4	(Croatia) L Bošković	3	6	6
Q	(Germany) Y Morderger	6	4	1
WC	(Belgium) E Vanlangendonck	6	4	6
7	(Germany) J Middendorf	4	6	2

Quarterfinals
E Maklakova	2	4
6	J Avdeeva	6	6
4	(Croatia) L Bošković	6	6
WC	(Belgium) E Vanlangendonck	3	0

Semifinals
6	J Avdeeva	7^{7}	7
4	(Croatia) L Bošković	6^{2}	5

=== Bottom half ===
First round
8	(Belgium) A Van Uytvanck	1^{r}
(Germany) L Schmidt	2
WC	(Germany) J Stusek	6	1	6
Q	(Germany) J Silva	4	6	4
(Australia) TN Smith	6	6
WC	(Germany) S Herrmann	0	3
Q	A Ibragimova	2	6	6
3/JE	(Belgium) S Costoulas	6	4	4
5	(Germany) M Barthel	6	7
(Czech Republic) A Kučmová	4	5
SR	(Germany) S Wagner	6	5	6
Q	(Germany) T Morderger	1	7	2
Q	(Serbia) A Krunić	7	6
E Yashina	5	4
(Slovakia) R Zelníčková	4	1
2	(Germany) E Seidel	6	6

Second round
(Germany) L Schmidt	6	6
WC	(Germany) J Stusek	4	3
(Australia) TN Smith	0	0
Q	A Ibragimova	6	6
5	(Germany) M Barthel	4	7^{7}	6
SR	(Germany) S Wagner	6	6^{0}	4
Q	(Serbia) A Krunić	1	6	5
2	(Germany) E Seidel	6	2	7

Quarterfinals
(Germany) L Schmidt	6	4	2
Q	A Ibragimova	4	6	6
5	(Germany) M Barthel	4	4
2	(Germany) E Seidel	6	6

Semifinals
Q	A Ibragimova	4	2
2	(Germany) E Seidel	6	6
