= 2025 Hamburg Ladies & Gents Cup – Men's doubles =

Men's doubles
- 2025 Hamburg Ladies & Gents Cup

Final
- Champions: (Belgium) Michael Geerts (Germany) Tim Rühl
- Runners-up: (Slovakia) Miloš Karol (Finland) Patrik Niklas-Salminen
- Score: 7–6^{(8–6)}, 7–5

Events
Singles	men	women
Doubles	men	women
- Hamburg Ladies & Gents Cup

Mattia Bellucci and Rémy Bertola were the defending champions but chose not to defend their title.

Michael Geerts and Tim Rühl won the title after defeating Miloš Karol and Patrik Niklas-Salminen 7–6^{(8–6)}, 7–5 in the final.

== Seeds ==
1. (Peru) Alexander Merino / (Germany) Christoph Negritu (first round)
2. (Slovakia) Miloš Karol / (Finland) Patrik Niklas-Salminen (final)
3. (Serbia) Stefan Latinović / (Poland) Szymon Walków (quarterfinals)
4. (Czech Republic) Jiří Barnat / (Czech Republic) Filip Duda (first round)

== Draw ==
Key

- Q = Qualifier
- WC = Wild card
- LL = Lucky loser
- Alt = Alternate
- ITF = ITF entry
- PR = Protected ranking
- SR = Special ranking
- SE = Special exempt
- JE = Junior exempt
- JR = Junior Accelerator Programme entrant
- CO = College Accelerator Programme entrant
- NG = Next Gen Accelerator Program entrant
- w/o = Walkover
- r = Retired
- d = Defaulted

=== Draw ===
First round
1	(Peru) A Merino (Germany) C Negritu	6	6^{5}	[7]
(Spain) Iván Marrero Curbelo (Czech Republic) D Poljak	4	7^{7}	[10]
WC	(Germany) M Möller (Germany) Mika Petkovic
(Czech Republic) J Jermář (India) A Kalyanpur	w/o
4	(Czech Republic) Jiří Barnat (Czech Republic) F Duda	2	2
(Belgium) M Geerts (Germany) T Rühl	6	6
(Finland) Patrick Kaukovalta (Finland) E Vasa	3	7^{7}	[10]
Alt	(Belgium) B Gadamauri (Spain) P Vives Marcos	6	6^{2}	[4]
WC	(Germany) N McDonald (Germany) J Opitz	7	6
(Spain) M Damas (Spain) A Moro Cañas	5	3
(Italy) Simone Agostini (Canada) K Stevenson	2	3
3	(Serbia) S Latinović (Poland) S Walków	6	6
Alt	(Netherlands) J Jans (Netherlands) N Visker	6^{5}	4
(Serbia) I Sabanov (Serbia) M Sabanov	7^{7}	6
(Germany) D Masur (Germany) M Topo	4	4
2	(Slovakia) M Karol (Finland) P Niklas-Salminen	6	6

Quarterfinals
(Spain) I Marrero Curbelo (Czech Republic) D Poljak	2	6	[10]
(Czech Republic) J Jermář (India) A Kalyanpur	6	4	[6]
(Belgium) M Geerts (Germany) T Rühl	7^{7}	6
(Finland) P Kaukovalta (Finland) E Vasa	6^{5}	3
WC	(Germany) N McDonald (Germany) J Opitz	6	7^{7}
3	(Serbia) S Latinović (Poland) S Walków	3	6^{2}
(Serbia) I Sabanov (Serbia) M Sabanov	3	1
2	(Slovakia) M Karol (Finland) P Niklas-Salminen	6	6

Semifinals
(Spain) I Marrero Curbelo (Czech Republic) D Poljak	6^{2}	7	[1]
(Belgium) M Geerts (Germany) T Rühl	7^{7}	5	[10]
WC	(Germany) N McDonald (Germany) J Opitz	2	7^{7}	[8]
2	(Slovakia) M Karol (Finland) P Niklas-Salminen	6	6^{5}	[10]

Final
(Belgium) M Geerts (Germany) T Rühl	7^{8}	7
2	(Slovakia) M Karol (Finland) P Niklas-Salminen	6^{6}	5
