= 2020 Tennis Challenger Hamburg – Doubles =

Doubles
- 2020 Tennis Challenger Hamburg

Final
- Champions: (Switzerland) Marc-Andrea Hüsler (Poland) Kamil Majchrzak
- Runners-up: (United Kingdom) Lloyd Glasspool (United States) Alex Lawson
- Score: 6–3, 1–6, [20–18]

Events
Singles	Doubles
← 2019 ·	Tennis Challenger Hamburg	· 2022 →

James Cerretani and Maxime Cressy were the defending champions but chose to compete with different partners. Cerretani partnered Dustin Brown but lost in the semifinals to Lloyd Glasspool and Alex Lawson. Cressy partnered Albano Olivetti but lost in the first round to Marc-Andrea Hüsler and Kamil Majchrzak.

Hüsler and Majchrzak won the title after defeating Glasspool and Lawson 6–3, 1–6, [20–18] in the final.

== Seeds ==
1. (Germany) Andre Begemann / (Netherlands) David Pel (quarterfinals)
2. (India) Sriram Balaji / (Switzerland) Luca Margaroli (quarterfinals)
3. (Sweden) André Göransson / (Poland) Jan Zieliński (semifinals, withdrew)
4. (United Kingdom) Lloyd Glasspool / (United States) Alex Lawson (final)

== Draw ==
=== Key ===
- Q = Qualifier
- WC = Wild card
- LL = Lucky loser
- Alt = Alternate
- ITF = ITF entry
- PR = Protected ranking
- SR = Special ranking
- SE = Special exempt
- JE = Junior exempt
- JR = Junior Accelerator Programme entrant
- CO = College Accelerator Programme entrant
- NG = Next Gen Accelerator Program entrant
- w/o = Walkover
- r = Retired
- d = Defaulted

First round
1	(Germany) A Begemann (Netherlands) D Pel	6	7
WC	(Germany) M Möller (Germany) M Wiskandt	2	5
(United States) M Cressy (France) A Olivetti	7^{7}	4	[4]
(Switzerland) M-A Hüsler (Poland) K Majchrzak	6^{2}	6	[10]
3	(Sweden) A Göransson (Poland) J Zieliński	6^{3}	7	[10]
(France) S Doumbia (France) F Reboul	7^{7}	5	[3]
(Denmark) M Torpegaard (United States) J. J. Wolf	3	6	[9]
(France) H Gaston (France) A Rinderknech	6	4	[11]
WC	(Germany) B Sanchez Martinez (Germany) C-M Stebe	6	3	[10]
WC	(Germany) Fabien Fallert (Germany) M Rosenkranz	2	6	[7]
(Germany) J Lenz (Germany) Y Maden	3	2
4	(United Kingdom) L Glasspool (United States) A Lawson	6	6
PR	(Germany) D Brown (United States) J Cerretani	7^{7}	6
(Canada) B Schnur (United States) J Withrow	6^{5}	3
Alt	(Ukraine) I Marchenko (Russia) R Safiullin	1	6^{4}
2	(India) S Balaji (Switzerland) L Margaroli	6	7^{7}

Quarterfinals
1	(Germany) A Begemann (Netherlands) D Pel	6^{2}	3
(Switzerland) M-A Hüsler (Poland) K Majchrzak	7^{7}	6
3	(Sweden) A Göransson (Poland) J Zieliński	w/o
(France) H Gaston (France) A Rinderknech
WC	(Germany) B Sanchez Martinez (Germany) C-M Stebe	1	3
4	(United Kingdom) L Glasspool (United States) A Lawson	6	6
PR	(Germany) D Brown (United States) J Cerretani	6	6
2	(India) S Balaji (Switzerland) L Margaroli	4	4

Semifinals
(Switzerland) M-A Hüsler (Poland) K Majchrzak	w/o
3	(Sweden) A Göransson (Poland) J Zieliński
4	(United Kingdom) L Glasspool (United States) A Lawson	7	6
PR	(Germany) D Brown (United States) J Cerretani	5	3

Final
(Switzerland) M-A Hüsler (Poland) K Majchrzak	6	1	[20]
4	(United Kingdom) L Glasspool (United States) A Lawson	3	6	[18]
