= 2023 Hamburg Ladies & Gents Cup =

- Date: 16–22 October
- Edition: 4th
- Category: ATP Challenger Tour; ITF Women's World Tennis Tour
- Surface: Hard (Indoor)
- Location: Hamburg, Germany

Champions

Men's singles
- (Ukraine) Illya Marchenko

Women's singles
- Julia Avdeeva

Men's doubles
- (Austria) Dennis Novak / (Australia) Akira Santillan

Women's doubles
- (Germany) Tayisiya Morderger / (Germany) Yana Morderger
← 2022 ·	Hamburg Ladies & Gents Cup	· 2024 →

The 2023 Hamburg Ladies & Gents Cup was a professional tennis tournament played on indoor hard courts. It was the fourth edition of the tournament which was part of the 2023 ATP Challenger Tour and the 2023 ITF Women's World Tennis Tour. It took place in Hamburg, Germany between 16 and 22 October 2023.

== Champions ==
=== Men's singles ===
- (Ukraine) Illya Marchenko def. (Austria) Dennis Novak 6–2, 6–3.

=== Women's singles ===
- Julia Avdeeva def. (Germany) Ella Seidel, 6–4, 7–6^{(7–2)}

=== Men's doubles ===
- (Austria) Dennis Novak / (Australia) Akira Santillan def. (Romania) Alexandru Jecan / (Netherlands) Mick Veldheer 6–4, 3–6, [10–3].

=== Women's doubles ===
- (Germany) Tayisiya Morderger / (Germany) Yana Morderger def. Julia Avdeeva / Ekaterina Maklakova, 6–1, 6–4

== Men's singles main draw entrants ==
=== Seeds ===
Country	Player	Rank^{1}	Seed
AUT	Dennis Novak	196	1
AUS	Adam Walton	199	2
HUN	Máté Valkusz	214	3
GER	Rudolf Molleker	219	4
POR	Frederico Ferreira Silva	226	5
TUR	Cem İlkel	229	6
AUT	Maximilian Neuchrist	238	7
UKR	Oleksii Krutykh	242	8

- ^{1} Rankings are as of 2 October 2023.

=== Other entrants ===
The following players received wildcards into the singles main draw:

- (Germany) Rudolf Molleker
- (Germany) Marvin Möller
- (Germany) Marko Topo

The following players received entry into the singles main draw as alternates:

- (North Macedonia) Kalin Ivanovski
- (Turkey) Ergi Kırkın

The following players received entry from the qualifying draw:

- (Spain) Javier Barranco Cosano
- (Germany) Lucas Gerch
- (France) Tristan Lamasine
- (Germany) Daniel Masur
- (Australia) Akira Santillan
- (India) Mukund Sasikumar

== Women's singles main draw entrants ==
=== Seeds ===
Country	Player	Rank^{1}	Seed
TUR	Berfu Cengiz	237	1
GER	Ella Seidel	257	2
BEL	Sofia Costoulas	281	3
CRO	Lea Bošković	290	4
GER	Mona Barthel	297	5
	Julia Avdeeva	350	6
GER	Julia Middendorf	355	7
BEL	Alison Van Uytvanck	364	8

- ^{1} Rankings are as of 9 October 2023.

=== Other entrants ===
The following players received wildcards into the singles main draw:

- (Germany) Tessa Johanna Brockmann
- (Germany) Sina Herrmann
- (Germany) Julia Stusek
- (Belgium) Eliessa Vanlangendonck

The following players received entry from the qualifying draw:

- (Israel) Vlada Ekshibarova
- Alevtina Ibragimova
- (Germany) Anna Klasen
- (Serbia) Aleksandra Krunić
- (Germany) Tayisiya Morderger
- (Germany) Yana Morderger
- (Germany) Johanna Silva
- (Belgium) Amelia Waligora
