= 2025 Hamburg Ladies & Gents Cup =

- Date: 20–26 October
- Edition: 6th
- Category: ATP Challenger Tour; ITF Women's World Tennis Tour
- Surface: Hard (Indoor)
- Location: Hamburg, Germany

Champions

Men's singles
- (Germany) Justin Engel

Women's singles
- Erika Andreeva

Men's doubles
- (Belgium) Michael Geerts / (Germany) Tim Rühl

Women's doubles
- (Poland) Martyna Kubka / (Greece) Sapfo Sakellaridi
- Hamburg Ladies & Gents Cup

The 2025 Hamburg Ladies & Gents Cup was a professional tennis tournament played on indoor hardcourts. It was the sixth edition of the tournament which was part of the 2025 ATP Challenger Tour and the 2025 ITF Women's World Tennis Tour. It took place in Hamburg, Germany between 20 and 26 October 2025.

== Champions ==
=== Men's singles ===
- (Germany) Justin Engel def. (Italy) Federico Cinà 7–5, 7–6^{(7–4)}.

=== Women's singles ===
- Erika Andreeva def. (Spain) Kaitlin Quevedo 6–4, 6–2.

=== Men's doubles ===
- (Belgium) Michael Geerts / (Germany) Tim Rühl def. (Slovakia) Miloš Karol / (Finland) Patrik Niklas-Salminen 7–6^{(8–6)}, 7–5.

=== Women's doubles ===
- (Poland) Martyna Kubka / (Greece) Sapfo Sakellaridi def. (Germany) Tessa Brockmann / (Germany) Phillippa Preugschat 6–3, 6–2.

== Men's singles main draw entrants ==
=== Seeds ===
Country	Player	Rank^{1}	Seed
ESP	Daniel Mérida	163	1
LUX	Chris Rodesch	190	2
BEL	Gauthier Onclin	196	3
GER	Justin Engel	206	4
GBR	George Loffhagen	211	5
ITA	Federico Cinà	226	6
ESP	Alejandro Moro Cañas	249	7
CRO	Matej Dodig	257	8

- ^{1} Rankings are as of 13 October 2025.

=== Other entrants ===
The following players received wildcards into the singles main draw:

- (Germany) Jamie Mackenzie
- (Germany) Niels McDonald
- (Germany) Mika Petkovic

The following players received entry into the singles main draw using protected rankings:

- (Bulgaria) Adrian Andreev
- (Italy) Francesco Forti
- (Germany) Cedrik-Marcel Stebe

The following player received entry into the singles main draw as a special exempt:

- (Czech Republic) Maxim Mrva

The following player received entry into the singles main draw through the Next Gen Accelerator programme:

- (Czech Republic) Petr Brunclík

The following players received entry from the qualifying draw:

- (Belgium) Buvaysar Gadamauri
- (Netherlands) Sander Jong
- (Slovakia) Miloš Karol
- (Germany) Marvin Möller
- (Germany) Jannik Opitz
- (Spain) Pedro Vives Marcos

== Women's singles main draw entrants ==
=== Seeds ===
Country	Player	Rank^{1}	Seed
ESP	Kaitlin Quevedo	160	1
GER	Mona Barthel	208	2
GER	Katharina Hobgarski	272	3
GER	Tessa Brockmann	314	4
CRO	Lea Bošković	322	5
	Erika Andreeva	333	6
POL	Martyna Kubka	365	7
GER	Antonia Schmidt	374	8

- ^{1} Rankings are as of 13 October 2025.

=== Other entrants ===
The following players received wildcards into the singles main draw:

- (Germany) Eva Bennemann
- (Germany) Anna Petkovic
- (Germany) Sophie Triquart
- (Germany) Sonja Zhenikhova

The following player received entry into the singles main draw using a special ranking:

- (Denmark) Sofia Samavati

The following players received entry from the qualifying draw:

- (Ukraine) Anna Burchak
- (Switzerland) Chelsea Fontenel
- (Belgium) Tamila Gadamauri
- (Germany) Mara Guth
- (Netherlands) Madelief Hageman
- (Poland) Zuzanna Kolonus
- (Germany) Johanna Silva
- (Czech Republic) Amy Suchá
