= 2024 Tennis Open Karlsruhe – Singles =

Singles
- 2024 Tennis Open Karlsruhe

Final
- Champion: (Slovakia) Jozef Kovalík
- Runner-up: (Argentina) Camilo Ugo Carabelli
- Score: 6–3, 7–6^{(7–2)}

Events
| Singles | Doubles |
| ← 2023 · | Tennis Open Karlsruhe | · 2025 → |

Alejandro Tabilo was the defending champion but chose not to defend his title.

Jozef Kovalík won the title after defeating Camilo Ugo Carabelli 6–3, 7–6^{(7–2)} in the final.

== Seeds ==
1. (Argentina) Camilo Ugo Carabelli (final)
2. (Slovakia) Jozef Kovalík (champion)
3. (France) Pierre-Hugues Herbert (first round)
4. (Lebanon) Benjamin Hassan (quarterfinals)
5. (Kazakhstan) Denis Yevseyev (first round)
6. (Bolivia) Hugo Dellien (first round)
7. (Hungary) Zsombor Piros (semifinals)
8. (Belgium) Joris De Loore (first round)

== Draw ==
=== Key ===
- Q = Qualifier
- WC = Wild card
- LL = Lucky loser
- Alt = Alternate
- SE = Special exempt
- PR = Protected ranking
- ITF = ITF entry
- JE = Junior exempt
- w/o = Walkover
- r = Retired
- d = Defaulted
- SR = Special ranking

=== Finals ===
Semifinals
1 | (Argentina) Camilo Ugo Carabelli | 6 | 6
7 | (Hungary) Zsombor Piros | 4 | 0
(Germany) Daniel Masur | 7^{7} | 0 | 1
2 | (Slovakia) Jozef Kovalík | 6^{3} | 6 | 6

Final
1 | (Argentina) Camilo Ugo Carabelli | 3 | 6^{2}
2 | (Slovakia) Jozef Kovalík | 6 | 7^{7}

=== Top half ===
First round
1 | (Argentina) C Ugo Carabelli | 3 | 6 | 6
(Czech Republic) Z Kolář | 6 | 3 | 1
(Argentina) S Rodríguez Taverna | 6^{4} | 6^{6}
Q | A Zakharov | 7^{7} | 7^{8}
(Czech Republic) M Vrbenský | 6 | 3 | 6
WC | (Germany) N Kuhn | 1 | 6 | 4
Q | (Lithuania) E Butvilas | 5 | 6 | 7^{7}
6 | (Bolivia) H Dellien | 7 | 3 | 6^{3}
3 | (France) P-H Herbert | 4 | 4
WC | (Germany) J Engel | 6 | 6
(Switzerland) J Kym | 3 | 7^{7} | 5
(Bulgaria) A Andreev | 6 | 6^{4} | 7
(France) C Tabur | 6 | 6
Alt | (United States) T Kodat | 2 | 3
(Spain) N Sánchez Izquierdo | 6^{5} | 4
7 | (Hungary) Z Piros | 7^{7} | 6

Second round
1 | (Argentina) C Ugo Carabelli | 6 | 7
Q | A Zakharov | 4 | 5
(Czech Republic) M Vrbenský | 7 | 1 | 3
Q | (Lithuania) E Butvilas | 5 | 6 | 6
WC | (Germany) J Engel | 6 | 4 | 0
(Bulgaria) A Andreev | 4 | 6 | 6
(France) C Tabur | 7 | 4 | 3
7 | (Hungary) Z Piros | 5 | 6 | 6

Quarterfinals
1 | (Argentina) C Ugo Carabelli | 6 | 6
Q | (Lithuania) E Butvilas | 4 | 1
(Bulgaria) A Andreev | 6 | 3 | 3
7 | (Hungary) Z Piros | 3 | 6 | 6

Semifinals
1 | (Argentina) C Ugo Carabelli | 6 | 6
7 | (Hungary) Z Piros | 4 | 0

=== Bottom half ===
First round
5 | (Kazakhstan) D Yevseyev | 2 | 3
(Jordan) A Shelbayh | 6 | 6
(Germany) D Masur | 3 | 6 | 7
A Kachmazov | 6 | 4 | 5
Q | (Latvia) R Strombachs | 6 | 6
(Spain) D Rincón | 3 | 4
Q | (Germany) MH Rehberg | 1 | 4
4 | (Lebanon) B Hassan | 6 | 6
8 | (Belgium) J De Loore | 6^{5} | 6 | 3
(Germany) R Molleker | 7^{7} | 1 | 6
PR | (France) E Furness | 6 | 6
WC | (Germany) D Dedura-Palomero | 3 | 2
(Venezuela) G Oliveira | 3 | 2
Q | (Germany) Liam Gavrielides | 6 | 6
Q | (Germany) Niklas Schell | 1 | 2
2 | (Slovakia) J Kovalík | 6 | 6

Second round
(Jordan) A Shelbayh | 6^{6} | 3
(Germany) D Masur | 7^{8} | 6
Q | (Latvia) R Strombachs | 3 | 4
4 | (Lebanon) B Hassan | 6 | 6
(Germany) R Molleker | 6 | 6
PR | (France) E Furness | 4 | 2
Q | (Germany) L Gavrielides | 7 | 3 | 4
2 | (Slovakia) J Kovalík | 5 | 6 | 6

Quarterfinals
(Germany) D Masur | 6 | 6
4 | (Lebanon) B Hassan | 3 | 3
(Germany) R Molleker | 6^{6} | 2
2 | (Slovakia) J Kovalík | 7^{8} | 6

Semifinals
(Germany) D Masur | 7^{7} | 0 | 1
2 | (Slovakia) J Kovalík | 6^{3} | 6 | 6
