= 2024 Tennis Open Karlsruhe =

- Date: 1 – 7 July
- Edition: 2nd
- Surface: Clay
- Location: Karlsruhe, Germany

Champions

Singles
- (Slovakia) Jozef Kovalík

Doubles
- (Germany) Jakob Schnaitter / (Germany) Mark Wallner
← 2023 ·	Tennis Open Karlsruhe	· 2025 →

The 2024 Tennis Open Karlsruhe was a professional tennis tournament played on clay courts. It was the second edition of the tournament which was part of the 2024 ATP Challenger Tour. It took place in Karlsruhe, Germany between 1 and 7 July 2024.

== Singles main-draw entrants ==
=== Seeds ===
Country	Player	Rank^{1}	Seed
ARG	Camilo Ugo Carabelli	100	1
SVK	Jozef Kovalík	114	2
FRA	Pierre-Hugues Herbert	140	3
LIB	Benjamin Hassan	156	4
KAZ	Denis Yevseyev	163	5
BOL	Hugo Dellien	173	6
HUN	Zsombor Piros	183	7
BEL	Joris De Loore	191	8

- ^{1} Rankings are as of 24 June 2024.

=== Other entrants ===
The following players received wildcards into the singles main draw:

- (Germany) Diego Dedura-Palomero
- (Germany) Justin Engel
- (Germany) Nicola Kuhn

The following players received entry into the singles main using a protected ranking:

- (France) Evan Furness

The following player received entry into the singles main draw as an alternate:

- (United States) Toby Kodat

The following players received entry from the qualifying draw:

- (Lithuania) Edas Butvilas
- (Germany) Liam Gavrielides
- (Germany) Max Hans Rehberg
- (Germany) Niklas Schell
- (Latvia) Robert Strombachs
- Alexey Zakharov

== Champions ==
=== Singles ===
- (Slovakia) Jozef Kovalík def. (Argentina) Camilo Ugo Carabelli 6–3, 7–6^{(7–2)}.

=== Doubles ===
- (Germany) Jakob Schnaitter / (Germany) Mark Wallner def. (France) Dan Added / (France) Grégoire Jacq 6–4, 6–0.
