= 2020 Tennis Challenger Hamburg – Singles =

Singles
- 2020 Tennis Challenger Hamburg

Final
- Champion: (Japan) Taro Daniel
- Runner-up: (Austria) Sebastian Ofner
- Score: 6–1, 6–2

Events
Singles	Doubles
← 2019 ·	Tennis Challenger Hamburg	· 2022 →

Botic van de Zandschulp was the defending champion but withdrew before his semifinal match against Taro Daniel.

Daniel won the title after defeating Sebastian Ofner 6–1, 6–2 in the final.

== Seeds ==
1. (Poland) Kamil Majchrzak (semifinals)
2. (Japan) Taro Daniel (champion)
3. (United States) J. J. Wolf (second round)
4. (Germany) Daniel Altmaier (first round, retired)
5. (India) Sumit Nagal (first round, retired)
6. (Switzerland) Henri Laaksonen (quarterfinals)
7. (Serbia) Nikola Milojević (quarterfinals)
8. (Germany) Oscar Otte (second round)

== Draw ==
=== Key ===
- Q = Qualifier
- WC = Wild card
- LL = Lucky loser
- Alt = Alternate
- ITF = ITF entry
- PR = Protected ranking
- SR = Special ranking
- SE = Special exempt
- JE = Junior exempt
- JR = Junior Accelerator Programme entrant
- CO = College Accelerator Programme entrant
- NG = Next Gen Accelerator Program entrant
- w/o = Walkover
- r = Retired
- d = Defaulted

=== Finals ===
Semifinals
1	(Poland) Kamil Majchrzak	6^{3}	1
(Austria) Sebastian Ofner	7^{7}	6
(Netherlands) Botic van de Zandschulp
2	(Japan) Taro Daniel	w/o

Final
(Austria) Sebastian Ofner	1	2
2	(Japan) Taro Daniel	6	6

=== Top half ===
First round
1	(Poland) K Majchrzak	6	6
(Italy) R Marcora	3	3
(Belgium) K Coppejans	0	1
(Germany) Y Maden	6	6
SE	(Croatia) B Gojo	4	7^{8}	5
Q	(Russia) P Kotov	6	6^{6}	7
(Slovakia) L Lacko	5	4
7	(Serbia) N Milojević	7	6
3	(United States) J. J. Wolf	6	6
Q	(Germany) M Bachinger	4	3
Q	(Italy) S Napolitano	2	2
(Russia) R Safiullin	6	6
(Austria) S Ofner	7^{8}	6
PR	(Germany) D Brown	6^{6}	2
LL	(France) H Gaston	7	4
5	(India) S Nagal	5	1^{r}

Second round
1	(Poland) K Majchrzak	6	6
(Germany) Y Maden	4	4
Q	(Russia) P Kotov	6^{5}	1
7	(Serbia) N Milojević	7^{7}	6
3	(United States) J. J. Wolf	6^{1}	4
(Russia) R Safiullin	7^{7}	6
(Austria) S Ofner	7^{7}	6
LL	(France) H Gaston	6^{5}	2

Quarterfinals
1	(Poland) K Majchrzak	6	6
7	(Serbia) N Milojević	3	1
(Russia) R Safiullin	6^{4}	6	4
(Austria) S Ofner	7^{7}	4	6

Semifinals
1	(Poland) K Majchrzak	6^{3}	1
(Austria) S Ofner	7^{7}	6

=== Bottom half ===
First round
8	(Germany) O Otte	6	6
(Switzerland) M-A Hüsler	2	3
(Slovakia) F Horanský	2	4
(Germany) C-M Stebe	6	6
(Netherlands) B van de Zandschulp	6	7
SE	(France) B Bonzi	4	5
LL	(Ukraine) I Marchenko	6	3
4/WC	(Germany) D Altmaier	4	2^{r}
6	(Switzerland) H Laaksonen	6	3	6
(Denmark) M Torpegaard	3	6	4
(India) P Gunneswaran	6	4	1
Q	(Germany) T Kamke	3	6	6
(United States) M Cressy	4	4
WC	(Germany) M Marterer	6	6
(France) A Rinderknech	3	6	4
2	(Japan) T Daniel	6	3	6

Second round
8	(Germany) O Otte	3	3
(Germany) C-M Stebe	6	6
(Netherlands) B van de Zandschulp	6	7
LL	(Ukraine) I Marchenko	4	5
6	(Switzerland) H Laaksonen	7^{7}	7
Q	(Germany) T Kamke	6^{0}	5
WC	(Germany) M Marterer	6	4	3
2	(Japan) T Daniel	4	6	6

Quarterfinals
(Germany) C-M Stebe	3	3
(Netherlands) B van de Zandschulp	6	6
6	(Switzerland) H Laaksonen	1	4
2	(Japan) T Daniel	6	6

Semifinals
(Netherlands) B van de Zandschulp
2	(Japan) T Daniel	w/o
