= 2026 Hamburg Ladies & Gents Cup – Men's doubles =

Men's doubles
- 2026 Hamburg Ladies & Gents Cup

Final
- Champions: (Croatia) Admir Kalender (Croatia) Nino Serdarušić
- Runners-up: (Germany) Niels McDonald (Germany) Jannik Opitz
- Score: 6–3, 6–4

Events
Singles	men	women
Doubles	men	women
- Hamburg Ladies & Gents Cup

Michael Geerts and Tim Rühl were the defending champions but only Rühl chose to defend his title, partnering Mick Veldheer. They lost in the semifinals to Niels McDonald and Jannik Opitz.

Admir Kalender and Nino Serdarušić won the title after defeating McDonald and Opitz 6–3, 6–4 in the final.

== Seeds ==
1. (Netherlands) Thijmen Loof / (Japan) Kaito Uesugi (first round)
2. (Romania) Alexandru Jecan / (Romania) Bogdan Pavel (quarterfinals)
3. (Germany) Tim Rühl / (Netherlands) Mick Veldheer (semifinals)
4. (Spain) Sergio Martos Gornés / (Poland) Szymon Walków (semifinals)

== Draw ==
Key

- Q = Qualifier
- WC = Wild card
- LL = Lucky loser
- Alt = Alternate
- ITF = ITF entry
- PR = Protected ranking
- SR = Special ranking
- SE = Special exempt
- JE = Junior exempt
- JR = Junior Accelerator Programme entrant
- CO = College Accelerator Programme entrant
- NG = Next Gen Accelerator Program entrant
- w/o = Walkover
- r = Retired
- d = Defaulted

First round
1	(Netherlands) T Loof (Japan) K Uesugi	6	4	[6]
(Peru) A Merino (United States) Michael Zhu	2	6	[10]
(United Kingdom) F Bass (Netherlands) J Jans	4	7^{7}	[4]
(Croatia) A Kalender (Croatia) N Serdarušić	6	6^{4}	[10]
4	(Spain) S Martos Gornés (Poland) S Walków	6	6
(Venezuela) B Pérez (Brazil) E Ribeiro	3	4
(Bolivia) B Arias (Bolivia) F Zeballos	3	2
(India) R Ramanathan (Spain) D Vega Hernández	6	6
(United States) C Papa (China) B Zheng	6	2	[10]
(Spain) Í Cervantes (Ukraine) D Molchanov	2	6	[8]
(Czech Republic) D Poljak (Ukraine) V Sachko	4	2
3	(Germany) T Rühl (Netherlands) M Veldheer	6	6
WC	(Germany) N McDonald (Germany) J Opitz	7	6
WC	(Germany) M Möller (Germany) Mika Petkovic	5	3
(Venezuela) Juan José Bianchi (Spain) B Pujol Navarro	7^{7}	3	[8]
2	(Romania) A Jecan (Romania) B Pavel	6^{0}	6	[10]

Quarterfinals
(Peru) A Merino (United States) M Zhu	3	3
(Croatia) A Kalender (Croatia) N Serdarušić	6	6
4	(Spain) S Martos Gornés (Poland) S Walków	3	7	[10]
(India) R Ramanathan (Spain) D Vega Hernández	6	5	[7]
(United States) C Papa (China) B Zheng	3	4
3	(Germany) T Rühl (Netherlands) M Veldheer	6	6
WC	(Germany) N McDonald (Germany) J Opitz	6	7
2	(Romania) A Jecan (Romania) B Pavel	3	5

Semifinals
(Croatia) A Kalender (Croatia) N Serdarušić	6	6
4	(Spain) S Martos Gornés (Poland) S Walków	3	2
3	(Germany) T Rühl (Netherlands) M Veldheer	6^{5}	6^{0}
WC	(Germany) N McDonald (Germany) J Opitz	7^{7}	7^{7}

Final
(Croatia) A Kalender (Croatia) N Serdarušić	6	6
WC	(Germany) N McDonald (Germany) J Opitz	3	4
