= 2023 Hamburg Ladies & Gents Cup – Women's doubles =

Women's doubles
- 2023 Hamburg Ladies & Gents Cup

Final
- Champions: (Germany) Tayisiya Morderger (Germany) Yana Morderger
- Runners-up: Julia Avdeeva; Ekaterina Maklakova
- Score: 6–1, 6–4

Events
Singles	men	women
Doubles	men	women
- Hamburg Ladies & Gents Cup

Miriam Kolodziejová and Jesika Malečková were the defending champions but chose not to participate.

Tayisiya Morderger and Yana Morderger won the title, defeating Julia Avdeeva and Ekaterina Maklakova in the final, 6–1, 6–4.

== Seeds ==
1. (Czech Republic) Aneta Kučmová / Ekaterina Yashina (semifinals)
2. (Germany) Laura Böhner / (United States) Chiara Scholl (quarterfinals)
3. (Germany) Tayisiya Morderger / (Germany) Yana Morderger (champions)
4. (Turkey) Berfu Cengiz / (Slovakia) Viktória Morvayová (quarterfinals)

== Draw ==
Key

- Q = Qualifier
- WC = Wild card
- LL = Lucky loser
- Alt = Alternate
- ITF = ITF entry
- PR = Protected ranking
- SR = Special ranking
- SE = Special exempt
- JE = Junior exempt
- JR = Junior Accelerator Programme entrant
- CO = College Accelerator Programme entrant
- NG = Next Gen Accelerator Program entrant
- w/o = Walkover
- r = Retired
- d = Defaulted

First round
(Germany) TJ Brockmann (Belgium) E Vanlangendonck	3	2
(Germany) E Seidel (Germany) J Stusek	6	6
(Turkey) A Aksu (Croatia) E Kajević	1	4
(Belgium) S Costoulas (Netherlands) I de Vroome	6	6
A Ibragimova (Netherlands) L Tran	7^{7}	6
(Serbia) A Krunić (Serbia) E Milovanović	6^{5}	4
(Germany) P Preugschat (Germany) J Silva	4	3
4	(Turkey) B Cengiz (Slovakia) V Morvayová	6	6
J Avdeeva; E Maklakova	3	7	[10]
(Germany) A Klasen (Germany) J Middendorf	6	5	[7]

Quarterfinals
1	(Czech Republic) A Kučmová; E Yashina	6	3	[10]
(Germany) E Seidel (Germany) J Stusek	3	6	[4]
3	(Germany) T Morderger (Germany) Y Morderger	6	6
(Belgium) S Costoulas (Netherlands) I de Vroome	4	1
A Ibragimova (Netherlands) L Tran	7^{9}	6
4	(Turkey) B Cengiz (Slovakia) V Morvayová	6^{7}	0
J Avdeeva; E Maklakova	6	6
2	(Germany) L Böhner (United States) C Scholl	2	3

Semifinals
1	(Czech Republic) A Kučmová; E Yashina	6	5	[5]
3	(Germany) T Morderger (Germany) Y Morderger	3	7	[10]
A Ibragimova (Netherlands) L Tran	4	6	[6]
J Avdeeva; E Maklakova	6	3	[10]

Final
3	(Germany) T Morderger (Germany) Y Morderger	6	6
J Avdeeva; E Maklakova	1	4
