= 2022 Hamburg Ladies & Gents Cup – Women's doubles =

Women's doubles
- 2022 Hamburg Ladies & Gents Cup

Final
- Champions: (Czech Republic) Miriam Kolodziejová (Czech Republic) Jesika Malečková
- Runners-up: (Slovenia) Veronika Erjavec (Norway) Malene Helgø
- Score: 6–4, 6–2

Events
Singles	men	women
Doubles	men	women
- Hamburg Ladies & Gents Cup

Kamilla Bartone and Ylena In-Albon were the defending champions but chose not to participate.

Miriam Kolodziejová and Jesika Malečková won the title, defeating Veronika Erjavec and Malene Helgø in the final, 6–4, 6–2.

== Seeds ==
1. (Czech Republic) Miriam Kolodziejová / (Czech Republic) Jesika Malečková (champions)
2. Anastasia Tikhonova / (Latvia) Daniela Vismane (first round)
3. Ekaterina Makarova / (Bosnia and Herzegovina) Anita Wagner (first round)
4. Ekaterina Kazionova / Ekaterina Yashina (quarterfinals)

== Draw ==
Key

- Q = Qualifier
- WC = Wild card
- LL = Lucky loser
- Alt = Alternate
- ITF = ITF entry
- PR = Protected ranking
- SR = Special ranking
- SE = Special exempt
- JE = Junior exempt
- JR = Junior Accelerator Programme entrant
- CO = College Accelerator Programme entrant
- NG = Next Gen Accelerator Program entrant
- w/o = Walkover
- r = Retired
- d = Defaulted

=== Draw ===
First round
1	(Czech Republic) M Kolodziejová (Czech Republic) J Malečková	6	6
(Netherlands) I Haverlag (Germany) Jo Steur	3	4
(Germany) M Guth (Germany) N Noha Akugue	6^{1}	6	[10]
(Georgia (country)) E Gorgodze; E Koklina	7^{7}	3	[6]
4	E Kazionova; E Yashina	6	4	[10]
(Germany) T Morderger (Germany) Y Morderger	4	6	[6]
WC	(Germany) TJ Brockmann (Germany) C Kuhl	6^{0}	3
(Germany) N Schunk (Germany) E Seidel	7^{7}	6
WC	(Belgium) E Vanlangendonck (Germany) AM Weissheim	6^{4}	0
(Germany) A Klasen (Germany) J Middendorf	7^{7}	6
(Turkey) B Cengiz (Serbia) L Radivojević	6	6
3	E Makarova (Bosnia and Herzegovina) A Wagner	2	4
(Slovenia) V Erjavec (Norway) M Helgø	6	6
WC	(Germany) J Daems (Germany) N Niermann	1	3
(Romania) O Gavrilă (Romania) A Vasilescu	2	7^{10}	[10]
2	A Tikhonova (Latvia) D Vismane	6	6^{8}	[8]

Quarterfinals
1	(Czech Republic) M Kolodziejová (Czech Republic) J Malečková	6	6
(Germany) M Guth (Germany) N Noha Akugue	0	3
4	E Kazionova; E Yashina	2	6	[3]
(Germany) N Schunk (Germany) E Seidel	6	3	[10]
(Germany) A Klasen (Germany) J Middendorf	6	3	[7]
(Turkey) B Cengiz (Serbia) L Radivojević	3	6	[10]
(Slovenia) V Erjavec (Norway) M Helgø	6	6
(Romania) O Gavrilă (Romania) A Vasilescu	2	3

Semifinals
1	(Czech Republic) M Kolodziejová (Czech Republic) J Malečková	w/o
(Germany) N Schunk (Germany) E Seidel
(Turkey) B Cengiz (Serbia) L Radivojević	6^{6}	6^{3}
(Slovenia) V Erjavec (Norway) M Helgø	7^{8}	7^{7}

Final
1	(Czech Republic) M Kolodziejová (Czech Republic) J Malečková	6	6
(Slovenia) V Erjavec (Norway) M Helgø	4	2
