= 2025 Hamburg Ladies & Gents Cup – Women's doubles =

Women's doubles
- 2025 Hamburg Ladies & Gents Cup

Final
- Champions: (Poland) Martyna Kubka (Greece) Sapfo Sakellaridi
- Runners-up: (Germany) Tessa Brockmann (Germany) Phillippa Preugschat
- Score: 6–3, 6–2

Events
Singles	men	women
Doubles	men	women
← 2024 ·	Hamburg Ladies & Gents Cup	· 2026 →

Martyna Kubka and Sapfo Sakellaridi won the title, defeating Tessa Brockmann and Phillippa Preugschat in the final, 6–3, 6–2.

Madeleine Brooks and Isabelle Haverlag were the defending champions, but Brooks chose to compete in Rovereto and Haverlag chose to compete in Guangzhou instead.

== Seeds ==
1. (Poland) Martyna Kubka / (Greece) Sapfo Sakellaridi (champions)
2. (Greece) Valentini Grammatikopoulou / (Poland) Monika Stankiewicz (first round)
3. (Switzerland) Chelsea Fontenel / (Romania) Oana Gavrilă (quarterfinals, withdrew)
4. (Croatia) Mariana Dražić / (Belgium) Amélie Van Impe (semifinals)

== Draw ==
Key

- Q = Qualifier
- WC = Wild card
- LL = Lucky loser
- Alt = Alternate
- ITF = ITF entry
- PR = Protected ranking
- SR = Special ranking
- SE = Special exempt
- JE = Junior exempt
- JR = Junior Accelerator Programme entrant
- CO = College Accelerator Programme entrant
- NG = Next Gen Accelerator Program entrant
- w/o = Walkover
- r = Retired
- d = Defaulted

=== Draw ===
First round
WC	(Germany) I Abendroth (Germany) J Abendroth	5	6	[11]
(Germany) A Petkovic (Germany) A Wirges	7	3	[9]
3	(Switzerland) C Fontenel (Romania) O Gavrilă	6	5	[10]
(Poland) D Gorska (Ukraine) K Lazarenko	3	7	[7]
E Andreeva (Turkey) B Cengiz	6	6
(United States) A Blokhina (Denmark) R Munk Mortensen	1	3
(Germany) E Bennemann (Germany) S Zhenikhova	6	6
A Kostina; A Mozgaleva	1	4
(Germany) A Melosch (Germany) J Silva	5	2
4	(Croatia) M Dražić (Belgium) A Van Impe	7	6
(Germany) G Groth (Italy) L Mair	6	3	[10]
(Germany) F Gettwart (Germany) M Hodzic	4	6	[6]
(Germany) T Brockmann (Germany) P Preugschat	4	6	[10]
2	(Greece) V Grammatikopoulou (Poland) M Stankiewicz	6	2	[3]

Quarterfinals
1	(Poland) M Kubka (Greece) S Sakellaridi	6	6
WC	(Germany) I Abendroth (Germany) J Abendroth	4	2
3	(Switzerland) C Fontenel (Romania) O Gavrilă
E Andreeva (Turkey) B Cengiz	w/o
(Germany) E Bennemann (Germany) S Zhenikhova	5	6^{2}
4	(Croatia) M Dražić (Belgium) A Van Impe	7	7^{7}
(Germany) G Groth (Italy) L Mair	6^{3}	3
(Germany) T Brockmann (Germany) P Preugschat	7^{7}	6

Semifinals
1	(Poland) M Kubka (Greece) S Sakellaridi	6	6
E Andreeva (Turkey) B Cengiz	3	1
4	(Croatia) M Dražić (Belgium) A Van Impe	6	4	[6]
(Germany) T Brockmann (Germany) P Preugschat	4	6	[10]

Final
1	(Poland) M Kubka (Greece) S Sakellaridi	6	6
(Germany) T Brockmann (Germany) P Preugschat	3	2
