= 2025 BOSS Open – Doubles =

Doubles
- 2025 BOSS Open

Final
- Champions: (Mexico) Santiago González (United States) Austin Krajicek
- Runners-up: (United States) Alex Michelsen (United States) Rajeev Ram
- Score: 6–4, 6–4

Details
- Draw: 16
- Seeds: 4

Events
Singles	Doubles
← 2024 ·	Stuttgart Open	· 2026 →

Santiago González and Austin Krajicek defeated Alex Michelsen and Rajeev Ram in the final, 6–4, 6–4 to win the men's doubles tennis title at the 2025 Stuttgart Open.

Rafael Matos and Marcelo Melo were the defending champions, but lost in the quarterfinals to González and Krajicek.

== Seeds ==
1. (Germany) Kevin Krawietz / (Germany) Tim Pütz (quarterfinals)
2. (France) Sadio Doumbia / (France) Fabien Reboul (quarterfinals)
3. (India) Rohan Bopanna / (Belgium) Sander Gillé (quarterfinals)
4. (Brazil) Rafael Matos / (Brazil) Marcelo Melo (quarterfinals)

== Draw ==
=== Key ===
- Q = Qualifier
- WC = Wild card
- LL = Lucky loser
- Alt = Alternate
- ITF = ITF entry
- PR = Protected ranking
- SR = Special ranking
- SE = Special exempt
- JE = Junior exempt
- JR = Junior Accelerator Programme entrant
- CO = College Accelerator Programme entrant
- NG = Next Gen Accelerator Program entrant
- w/o = Walkover
- r = Retired
- d = Defaulted

=== Draw ===
First round
1	(Germany) K Krawietz (Germany) T Pütz	6	6
(Italy) M Arnaldi (Italy) L Sonego	4	2
WC	(Germany) Y Hanfmann (Germany) A Mies	5	6^{4}
(United States) A Michelsen (United States) R Ram	7	7^{7}
3	(India) R Bopanna (Belgium) S Gillé	6	5	[11]
(Germany) J Schnaitter (Germany) M Wallner	3	7	[9]
(United States) T Fritz (Czech Republic) J Lehečka	6	6^{2}	[10]
(Germany) H Jebens (France) A Olivetti	4	7^{7}	[4]
(India) Y Bhambri (United States) R Galloway	6^{5}	6^{5}
(Mexico) S González (United States) A Krajicek	7^{7}	7^{7}
WC	(Germany) J Engel (Germany) J-L Struff	7^{7}	3	[7]
4	(Brazil) R Matos (Brazil) M Melo	6^{4}	6	[10]
(Austria) A Erler (Germany) C Frantzen	3	6	[9]
(Portugal) F Cabral (Austria) L Miedler	6	4	[11]
(India) S Balaji (Mexico) MÁ Reyes-Varela	7^{7}	3	[5]
2	(France) S Doumbia (France) F Reboul	6^{5}	6	[10]

Quarterfinals
1	(Germany) K Krawietz (Germany) T Pütz	6^{5}	7^{7}	[5]
(United States) A Michelsen (United States) R Ram	7^{7}	6^{4}	[10]
3	(India) R Bopanna (Belgium) S Gillé	5	4
(United States) T Fritz (Czech Republic) J Lehečka	7	6
(Mexico) S González (United States) A Krajicek	7	6
4	(Brazil) R Matos (Brazil) M Melo	5	4
(Portugal) F Cabral (Austria) L Miedler	6	6
2	(France) S Doumbia (France) F Reboul	4	4

Semifinals
(United States) A Michelsen (United States) R Ram	7^{9}	6^{2}	[11]
(United States) T Fritz (Czech Republic) J Lehečka	6^{7}	7^{7}	[9]
(Mexico) S González (United States) A Krajicek	7^{7}	7^{7}
(Portugal) F Cabral (Austria) L Miedler	6^{5}	6^{3}

Final
(United States) A Michelsen (United States) R Ram	4	4
(Mexico) S González (United States) A Krajicek	6	6
