= 2023 Hamburg Ladies & Gents Cup – Men's doubles =

Men's doubles
- 2023 Hamburg Ladies & Gents Cup

Final
- Champions: (Austria) Dennis Novak (Australia) Akira Santillan
- Runners-up: (Romania) Alexandru Jecan (Netherlands) Mick Veldheer
- Score: 6–4, 3–6, [10–3]

Events
Singles	men	women
Doubles	men	women
- Hamburg Ladies & Gents Cup

Treat Huey and Max Schnur were the defending champions but chose not to defend their title.

Dennis Novak and Akira Santillan won the title after defeating Alexandru Jecan and Mick Veldheer 6–4, 3–6, [10–3] in the final.

== Seeds ==
1. (France) Dan Added / (Switzerland) Jakub Paul (quarterfinals)
2. (United States) Hunter Reese / (Australia) Adam Walton (quarterfinals)
3. (Romania) Alexandru Jecan / (Netherlands) Mick Veldheer (final)
4. (United Kingdom) Billy Harris / (Canada) Kelsey Stevenson (first round)

== Draw ==
Key

- Q = Qualifier
- WC = Wild card
- LL = Lucky loser
- Alt = Alternate
- ITF = ITF entry
- PR = Protected ranking
- SR = Special ranking
- SE = Special exempt
- JE = Junior exempt
- JR = Junior Accelerator Programme entrant
- CO = College Accelerator Programme entrant
- NG = Next Gen Accelerator Program entrant
- w/o = Walkover
- r = Retired
- d = Defaulted

First round
1	(France) D Added (Switzerland) J Paul	6	6
(Netherlands) M Hermans (Netherlands) J Sels	4	3
(Turkey) C İlkel (Turkey) E Kırkın	1	2
WC	(Germany) J Schnaitter (Germany) M Wallner	6	6
3	(Romania) A Jecan (Netherlands) M Veldheer	7^{8}	3	[10]
(Spain) J Barranco Cosano (Spain) D Jordà Sanchis	6^{6}	6	[8]
(Germany) D Masur (Germany) L Wessels	6	6
(Bosnia and Herzegovina) M Bašić (Croatia) N Serdarušić	3	4
(Lebanon) H Habib (India) Parikshit Somani	6	6
(Turkey) S Ağabigün (Turkey) A Çelikbilek	4	3
(Uzbekistan) D Istomin; E Karlovskiy	7^{7}	6
4	(United Kingdom) B Harris (Canada) K Stevenson	6^{4}	3
(Austria) D Novak (Australia) A Santillan	6	6
WC	(Turkey) T Duran (Germany) Noel Larwig	0	4
(Ukraine) O Krutykh (Germany) R Molleker
2	(United States) H Reese (Australia) A Walton	w/o

Quarterfinals
1	(France) D Added (Switzerland) J Paul	6	5	[7]
WC	(Germany) J Schnaitter (Germany) M Wallner	4	7	[10]
3	(Romania) A Jecan (Netherlands) M Veldheer	6	5	[10]
(Germany) D Masur (Germany) L Wessels	2	7	[5]
(Lebanon) H Habib (India) P Somani	4	6^{6}
(Uzbekistan) D Istomin; E Karlovskiy	6	7^{8}
(Austria) D Novak (Australia) A Santillan	6	7^{7}
2	(United States) H Reese (Australia) A Walton	1	6^{3}

Semifinals
WC	(Germany) J Schnaitter (Germany) M Wallner	7^{11}	5	[8]
3	(Romania) A Jecan (Netherlands) M Veldheer	6^{9}	7	[10]
(Uzbekistan) D Istomin; E Karlovskiy
(Austria) D Novak (Australia) A Santillan	w/o

Final
3	(Romania) A Jecan (Netherlands) M Veldheer	4	6	[3]
(Austria) D Novak (Australia) A Santillan	6	3	[10]
