= 2022 Hamburg Ladies & Gents Cup – Men's doubles =

Men's doubles
- 2022 Hamburg Ladies & Gents Cup

Final
- Champions: (Philippines) Treat Huey (United States) Max Schnur
- Runners-up: (Jamaica) Dustin Brown (Germany) Julian Lenz
- Score: 7–6^{(8–6)}, 6–4

Events
Singles	men	women
Doubles	men	women
- Hamburg Ladies & Gents Cup

Marc-Andrea Hüsler and Kamil Majchrzak were the defending champions but chose not to defend their title.

Treat Huey and Max Schnur won the title after defeating Dustin Brown and Julian Lenz 7–6^{(8–6)}, 6–4 in the final.

== Seeds ==
1. (Philippines) Treat Huey / (United States) Max Schnur (champions)
2. (Germany) Fabian Fallert / (Germany) Hendrik Jebens (quarterfinals)
3. (New Zealand) Artem Sitak / (Netherlands) Sem Verbeek (semifinals)
4. (Romania) Victor Vlad Cornea / (Czech Republic) Andrew Paulson (semifinals)

== Draw ==
Key

- Q = Qualifier
- WC = Wild card
- LL = Lucky loser
- Alt = Alternate
- ITF = ITF entry
- PR = Protected ranking
- SR = Special ranking
- SE = Special exempt
- JE = Junior exempt
- JR = Junior Accelerator Programme entrant
- CO = College Accelerator Programme entrant
- NG = Next Gen Accelerator Program entrant
- w/o = Walkover
- r = Retired
- d = Defaulted

First round
1	(Philippines) T Huey (United States) M Schnur	6	6
(Croatia) D Ajduković (Czech Republic) J Forejtek	0	1
(Lebanon) B Hassan (Netherlands) J Sels	6	7^{8}
(Czech Republic) P Nouza (Czech Republic) M Vrbenský	3	6^{6}
3	(New Zealand) A Sitak (Netherlands) S Verbeek	6	6
(Uzbekistan) S Fayziev; E Karlovskiy	2	4
(United Kingdom) B Harris (Canada) K Stevenson	6	3	[8]
WC	(Germany) T Sandkaulen (Germany) H Squire	3	6	[10]
(Germany) Niklas Schell (Germany) K Wehnelt	6	6
(France) K de Schepper (France) L Sanchez	4	3
WC	(Germany) N Kuhn (Germany) R Molleker	1	4
4	(Romania) VV Cornea (Czech Republic) A Paulson	6	6
(Turkey) E Kırkın (Ukraine) O Krutykh	3	6	[6]
2	(Germany) F Fallert (Germany) H Jebens	6	3	[10]

Quarterfinals
1	(Philippines) T Huey (United States) M Schnur	6	7^{7}
(Lebanon) B Hassan (Netherlands) J Sels	1	6^{4}
3	(New Zealand) A Sitak (Netherlands) S Verbeek	6	7^{7}
WC	(Germany) T Sandkaulen (Germany) H Squire	2	6^{5}
(Germany) N Schell (Germany) K Wehnelt	3	6	[7]
4	(Romania) VV Cornea (Czech Republic) A Paulson	6	1	[10]
(Jamaica) D Brown (Germany) J Lenz	6	7
2	(Germany) F Fallert (Germany) H Jebens	2	5

Semifinals
1	(Philippines) T Huey (United States) M Schnur	6	7^{7}
3	(New Zealand) A Sitak (Netherlands) S Verbeek	4	6^{4}
4	(Romania) VV Cornea (Czech Republic) A Paulson	4	2
(Jamaica) D Brown (Germany) J Lenz	6	6

Final
1	(Philippines) T Huey (United States) M Schnur	7^{8}	6
(Jamaica) D Brown (Germany) J Lenz	6^{6}	4
