= 2025 BOSS Open – Singles =

Singles
- 2025 BOSS Open

Final
- Champion: (United States) Taylor Fritz
- Runner-up: (Germany) Alexander Zverev
- Score: 6–3, 7–6^{(7–0)}

Details
- Draw: 28 (4 Q / 3 WC )
- Seeds: 8

Events
Singles	Doubles
- Stuttgart Open

Taylor Fritz defeated Alexander Zverev in the final, 6–3, 7–6^{(7–0)} to win the singles tennis title at the 2025 Stuttgart Open. He won the title without losing a set or having his serve broken during the tournament. It was Fritz's fourth grass court title, and ninth ATP Tour singles title overall.

Jack Draper was the reigning champion, but did not participate this year.

At 17 years and eight months old, Justin Engel was the second-youngest player since 1990 to win a tour-level match (excluding Davis Cup) on three surfaces, after Rafael Nadal. He became the youngest quarterfinalist in the tournament's history and the youngest at any grass-court tournament since Boris Becker at the 1985 Wimbledon Championships.

== Seeds ==
The top four seeds received a bye into the second round.

1. (Germany) Alexander Zverev (final)
2. (United States) Taylor Fritz (champion)
3. (United States) Ben Shelton (semifinals)
4. (Canada) Félix Auger-Aliassime (semifinals)
5. (Canada) Denis Shapovalov (first round)
6. (United States) Brandon Nakashima (quarterfinals)
7. (United States) Alex Michelsen (second round)
8. (Czech Republic) Jiří Lehečka (quarterfinals)

== Draw ==
Key

- Q = Qualifier
- WC = Wild card
- LL = Lucky loser
- Alt = Alternate
- ITF = ITF entry
- PR = Protected ranking
- SR = Special ranking
- SE = Special exempt
- JE = Junior exempt
- JR = Junior Accelerator Programme entrant
- CO = College Accelerator Programme entrant
- NG = Next Gen Accelerator Program entrant
- w/o = Walkover
- r = Retired
- d = Defaulted

=== Finals ===
Semifinals
1	(Germany) Alexander Zverev	7^{10}	7^{7}
3	(United States) Ben Shelton	6^{8}	6^{1}
4	(Canada) Félix Auger-Aliassime	4	6^{5}
2	(United States) Taylor Fritz	6	7^{7}

Final
1	(Germany) Alexander Zverev	3	6^{0}
2	(United States) Taylor Fritz	6	7^{7}

=== Top half ===
First round
WC	(Italy) F Fognini	4	7^{7}	3
(France) C Moutet	6	6^{3}	6
(United States) L Tien	6^{3}	7^{7}	0
(Japan) Y Nishioka	7^{7}	6^{3}	0^{r}
(United Kingdom) J Fearnley	6	6^{4}	1
6	(United States) B Nakashima	4	7^{7}	6
(Bosnia and Herzegovina) D Džumhur	4	0^{r}
Q	(France) P-H Herbert	6	3
(Italy) M Arnaldi	4	4
WC	(Germany) J-L Struff	6	6
(France) B Bonzi	4	4
8	(Czech Republic) J Lehečka	6	6

Second round
1	(Germany) A Zverev	6	7^{9}
(France) C Moutet	2	6^{7}
(United States) L Tien	6^{5}	3
6	(United States) B Nakashima	7^{7}	6
3	(United States) B Shelton	7^{7}	7
Q	(France) P-H Herbert	6^{4}	5
WC	(Germany) J-L Struff	4	5
8	(Czech Republic) J Lehečka	6	7

Quarterfinals
1	(Germany) A Zverev	7	6
6	(United States) B Nakashima	5	4
3	(United States) B Shelton	6	6
8	(Czech Republic) J Lehečka	4	4

Semifinals
1	(Germany) A Zverev	7^{10}	7^{7}
3	(United States) B Shelton	6^{8}	6^{1}

=== Bottom half ===
First round
7	(United States) A Michelsen	6	4	6
(France) G Monfils	4	6	3
WC	(Germany) J Engel	4	6	7^{7}
Q	(Australia) J Duckworth	6	4	6^{5}
R Safiullin	6^{10}	6	5
(France) G Mpetshi Perricard	7^{12}	3	7
5	(Canada) D Shapovalov	4	6	0
(France) A Rinderknech	6	2	6
Q	(Germany) Y Hanfmann	5	4
Q	(Hungary) M Fucsovics	7	6
(France) Q Halys	6^{6}	7	6
(Italy) L Sonego	7^{8}	5	4

Second round
7	(United States) A Michelsen	4	4
WC	(Germany) J Engel	6	6
(France) G Mpetshi Perricard	4	4
4	(Canada) F Auger-Aliassime	6	6
(France) A Rinderknech	6^{4}	3
Q	(Hungary) M Fucsovics	7^{7}	6
(France) Q Halys	3	6^{6}
2	(United States) T Fritz	6	7^{8}

Quarterfinals
WC	(Germany) J Engel	6^{3}	3
4	(Canada) F Auger-Aliassime	7^{7}	6
Q	(Hungary) M Fucsovics	3	4
2	(United States) T Fritz	6	6

Semifinals
4	(Canada) F Auger-Aliassime	4	6^{5}
2	(United States) T Fritz	6	7^{7}

== Qualifying ==
=== Seeds ===
1. (Australia) James Duckworth (qualified)
2. (United States) Eliot Spizzirri (first round)
3. (United States) Tristan Boyer (qualifying competition)
4. (Hungary) Márton Fucsovics (qualified)
5. (Georgia (country)) Nikoloz Basilashvili (qualifying competition)
6. (Germany) Yannick Hanfmann (qualified)
7. (France) Pierre-Hugues Herbert (qualified)
8. (Switzerland) Marc-Andrea Hüsler (first round)

=== Qualifiers ===
1. (Australia) James Duckworth
2. (France) Pierre-Hugues Herbert
3. (Germany) Yannick Hanfmann
4. (Hungary) Márton Fucsovics

=== Qualifying draw ===
==== First qualifier ====
First round
1	(Australia) James Duckworth	6	7^{7}
(Lebanon) Benjamin Hassan	3	6^{4}
(France) Hugo Grenier	6	6^{11}	2
5	(Georgia (country)) Nikoloz Basilashvili	2	7^{13}	6

Qualifying competition
1	(Australia) James Duckworth	6^{4}	7^{7}	6
5	(Georgia (country)) Nikoloz Basilashvili	7^{7}	6^{5}	3

==== Second qualifier ====
First round
2	(United States) Eliot Spizzirri	4	5
(Australia) Li Tu	6	7
Alt	(Germany) Maximilian Marterer	1	1
7	(France) Pierre-Hugues Herbert	6	6

Qualifying competition
(Australia) Li Tu	3	7^{7}	1
7	(France) Pierre-Hugues Herbert	6	6^{2}	6

==== Third qualifier ====
First round
3	(United States) Tristan Boyer	6^{5}	7^{9}	7^{7}
(Croatia) Duje Ajduković	7^{7}	6^{7}	6^{5}
WC	(Germany) Max Wiskandt	4	2
6	(Germany) Yannick Hanfmann	6	6

Qualifying competition
3	(United States) Tristan Boyer	6^{12}	4
6	(Germany) Yannick Hanfmann	7^{14}	6

==== Fourth qualifier ====
First round
4	(Hungary) Márton Fucsovics	6	6^{2}	7
WC	(Germany) Patrick Zahraj	4	7^{7}	5
(Kazakhstan) Beibit Zhukayev	6	5	6
8	(Switzerland) Marc-Andrea Hüsler	3	7	4

Qualifying competition
4	(Hungary) Márton Fucsovics	6^{5}	6	6
(Kazakhstan) Beibit Zhukayev	7^{7}	3	2
