= 2023 Hamburg Ladies & Gents Cup – Men's singles =

Men's singles
- 2023 Hamburg Ladies & Gents Cup

Final
- Champion: (Ukraine) Illya Marchenko
- Runner-up: (Austria) Dennis Novak
- Score: 6–2, 6–3

Events
Singles	men	women
Doubles	men	women
← 2022 ·	Hamburg Ladies & Gents Cup	· 2024 →

Alexander Ritschard was the defending champion but chose not to defend his title.

Illya Marchenko won the title after defeating Dennis Novak 6–2, 6–3 in the final.

== Seeds ==
1. (Austria) Dennis Novak (final)
2. (Australia) Adam Walton (quarterfinals)
3. (Hungary) Máté Valkusz (quarterfinals)
4. (Germany) Rudolf Molleker (first round)
5. (Portugal) Frederico Ferreira Silva (first round)
6. (Turkey) Cem İlkel (second round)
7. (Austria) Maximilian Neuchrist (second round)
8. (Ukraine) Oleksii Krutykh (first round)

== Draw ==
=== Key ===
- Q = Qualifier
- WC = Wild card
- LL = Lucky loser
- Alt = Alternate
- ITF = ITF entry
- PR = Protected ranking
- SR = Special ranking
- SE = Special exempt
- JE = Junior exempt
- JR = Junior Accelerator Programme entrant
- CO = College Accelerator Programme entrant
- NG = Next Gen Accelerator Program entrant
- w/o = Walkover
- r = Retired
- d = Defaulted

=== Finals ===
Semifinals
1	(Austria) Dennis Novak	4	6	6
Q	(France) Tristan Lamasine	6	3	4
(United Kingdom) Billy Harris	5	6	5
(Ukraine) Illya Marchenko	7	3	7

Final
1	(Austria) Dennis Novak	2	3
(Ukraine) Illya Marchenko	6	6

=== Top half ===
First round
1	(Austria) D Novak	7^{7}	6
WC	(Germany) M Topo	6^{2}	1
Q	(Germany) Lucas Gerch	3	6^{5}
(Switzerland) A Bellier	6	7^{7}
(France) D Added	2	7	4
Q	(Spain) J Barranco Cosano	6	5	6
(France) G Debru	6	6
5	(Portugal) F Ferreira Silva	4	1
4/WC	(Germany) R Molleker	3	4
Q	(Australia) A Santillan	6	6
(Slovakia) N Gombos	2	5
WC	(Germany) M Möller	6	7
Q	(France) T Lamasine	6	6
(France) M Guinard	0	0
(Tunisia) M Echargui	4	4
7	(Austria) M Neuchrist	6	6

Second round
1	(Austria) D Novak	6	7
(Switzerland) A Bellier	3	5
Q	(Spain) J Barranco Cosano	6	2	6
(France) G Debru	3	6	4
Q	(Australia) A Santillan	6	7
WC	(Germany) M Möller	4	5
Q	(France) T Lamasine	7	6
7	(Austria) M Neuchrist	5	4

Quarterfinals
1	(Austria) D Novak	6	6
Q	(Spain) J Barranco Cosano	2	2
Q	(Australia) A Santillan	4	2
Q	(France) T Lamasine	6	6

Semifinals
1	(Austria) D Novak	4	6	6
Q	(France) T Lamasine	6	3	4

=== Bottom half ===
First round
6	(Turkey) C İlkel	6	3
(Switzerland) H Laaksonen	2	1^{r}
(Spain) N Sánchez Izquierdo	4	2
(United Kingdom) B Harris	6	6
(Italy) S Napolitano	1	6	6
Q	(Germany) D Masur	6	2	4
(Croatia) N Serdarušić	4	4
3	(Hungary) M Valkusz	6	6
8	(Ukraine) O Krutykh	2	3
(Ukraine) I Marchenko	6	6
Q	(India) M Sasikumar	5	6^{3}
(Turkey) A Çelikbilek	7	7^{7}
Alt	(North Macedonia) K Ivanovski	2	4
(Netherlands) J Sels	6	6
Alt	(Turkey) E Kırkın	2	4
2	(Australia) A Walton	6	6

Second round
6	(Turkey) C İlkel	6^{4}	1
(United Kingdom) B Harris	7^{7}	6
(Italy) S Napolitano	7^{7}	4	4
3	(Hungary) M Valkusz	6^{5}	6	6
(Ukraine) I Marchenko	6	3	7^{7}
(Turkey) A Çelikbilek	4	6	6^{3}
(Netherlands) J Sels	6	3	3
2	(Australia) A Walton	3	6	6

Quarterfinals
(United Kingdom) B Harris	4	6	6
3	(Hungary) M Valkusz	6	0	2
(Ukraine) I Marchenko	6	6
2	(Australia) A Walton	4	1

Semifinals
(United Kingdom) B Harris	5	6	5
(Ukraine) I Marchenko	7	3	7
