= 2023 Tennis Open Karlsruhe – Singles =

Singles
- 2023 Tennis Open Karlsruhe

Final
- Champion: (Chile) Alejandro Tabilo
- Runner-up: (Italy) Giulio Zeppieri
- Score: 2–6, 1–0 ret.

Events
Singles	Doubles
Tennis Open Karlsruhe	· 2024 →

This was the first edition of the tournament.

Alejandro Tabilo won the title after Giulio Zeppieri retired leading 6–2, 0–1 in the final.

== Seeds ==
1. (Hungary) Zsombor Piros (semifinals)
2. Pavel Kotov (second round)
3. (Spain) Pedro Martínez (second round)
4. (Italy) Giulio Zeppieri (final, retired)
5. (Brazil) Thiago Seyboth Wild (quarterfinals)
6. (Kazakhstan) Timofey Skatov (semifinals)
7. Ivan Gakhov (quarterfinals)
8. (Chile) Alejandro Tabilo (champion)

== Draw ==
=== Key ===
- Q = Qualifier
- WC = Wild card
- LL = Lucky loser
- Alt = Alternate
- SE = Special exempt
- PR = Protected ranking
- ITF = ITF entry
- JE = Junior exempt
- w/o = Walkover
- r = Retired
- d = Defaulted
- SR = Special ranking

=== Finals ===
Semifinals
1	(Hungary) Zsombor Piros	6	3	3
4	(Italy) Giulio Zeppieri	2	6	6
6	(Kazakhstan) Timofey Skatov	4	1
8	(Chile) Alejandro Tabilo	6	6

Final
4	(Italy) Giulio Zeppieri	6	0^{r}
8	(Chile) Alejandro Tabilo	2	1

=== Top half ===
First round
1	(Hungary) Z Piros	7	7^{7}
(France) G Blancaneaux	5	6^{5}
Q	(Germany) T Handel	5	7	6
Q	(United States) Dali Blanch	7	5	0
(Serbia) M Zekić	3	4
WC	(Germany) M Topo	6	6
Q	(Kazakhstan) D Yevseyev	6	3	3
5	(Brazil) T Seyboth Wild	4	6	6
4	(Italy) G Zeppieri	6	7
Q	(Australia) A Santillan	3	5
(Argentina) H Casanova	3	5
(France) B Paire	6	7
(Belgium) M Geerts	6	3	5
(Germany) R Molleker	3	6	7
(Bosnia and Herzegovina) N Fatić	6^{6}	2
7	I Gakhov	7^{8}	6

Second round
1	(Hungary) Z Piros	7^{9}	6
Q	(Germany) T Handel	6^{7}	3
WC	(Germany) M Topo	4	2
5	(Brazil) T Seyboth Wild	6	6
4	(Italy) G Zeppieri	4	6	6
(France) B Paire	6	3	4
(Germany) R Molleker	4	6	3
7	I Gakhov	6	3	6

Quarterfinals
1	(Hungary) Z Piros	6	2	6
5	(Brazil) T Seyboth Wild	3	6	3
4	(Italy) G Zeppieri	6	6
7	I Gakhov	1	4

Semifinals
1	(Hungary) Z Piros	6	3	3
4	(Italy) G Zeppieri	2	6	6

=== Bottom half ===
First round
6	(Kazakhstan) T Skatov	6	3	6
(Luxembourg) C Rodesch	4	6	2
(Argentina) JP Ficovich	0	3
(Ukraine) V Sachko	6	6
Q	(Lebanon) H Habib	6	6
(Switzerland) H Laaksonen	1	3
(Slovakia) N Gombos	7^{7}	4	3
3	(Spain) P Martínez	6^{2}	6	6
8	(Chile) A Tabilo	7	6
WC	(Germany) H Squire	5	1
Q	(Spain) O Roca Batalla	6	6^{8}	6^{3}
WC	(Germany) Liam Gavrielides	2	7^{10}	7^{7}
(Czech Republic) V Kopřiva	6	3	2
(Switzerland) L Riedi	4	6	6
(Tunisia) A Dougaz	6	2	5
2	P Kotov	2	6	7

Second round
6	(Kazakhstan) T Skatov	3	7^{10}	7^{9}
(Ukraine) V Sachko	6	6^{8}	6^{7}
Q	(Lebanon) H Habib	7^{7}	7
3	(Spain) P Martínez	6^{2}	5
8	(Chile) A Tabilo	6	6
WC	(Germany) L Gavrielides	1	1
(Switzerland) L Riedi	6	7^{9}
2	P Kotov	2	6^{7}

Quarterfinals
6	(Kazakhstan) T Skatov	6	6
Q	(Lebanon) H Habib	3	2
8	(Chile) A Tabilo	6	3	7
(Switzerland) L Riedi	1	6	5

Semifinals
6	(Kazakhstan) T Skatov	4	1
8	(Chile) A Tabilo	6	6
