= 2022 Hamburg Ladies & Gents Cup – Men's singles =

Men's singles
- 2022 Hamburg Ladies & Gents Cup

Final
- Champion: (Switzerland) Alexander Ritschard
- Runner-up: (Switzerland) Henri Laaksonen
- Score: 7–5, 6–5 ret.

Events
Singles	men	women
Doubles	men	women
← 2020 ·	Hamburg Ladies & Gents Cup	· 2023 →

Taro Daniel was the defending champion but chose not to defend his title.

Alexander Ritschard won the title while leading 7–5, 6–5 after Henri Laaksonen retired in the final.

== Seeds ==
1. (France) Grégoire Barrère (quarterfinals)
2. (Netherlands) Jelle Sels (quarterfinals)
3. (Austria) Dennis Novak (first round)
4. (Switzerland) Alexander Ritschard (champion)
5. (Switzerland) Henri Laaksonen (final, retired)
6. (Turkey) Altuğ Çelikbilek (first round)
7. (Czech Republic) Jonáš Forejtek (quarterfinals)
8. (Ukraine) Oleksii Krutykh (first round)

== Draw ==
=== Key ===
- Q = Qualifier
- WC = Wild card
- LL = Lucky loser
- Alt = Alternate
- ITF = ITF entry
- PR = Protected ranking
- SR = Special ranking
- SE = Special exempt
- JE = Junior exempt
- JR = Junior Accelerator Programme entrant
- CO = College Accelerator Programme entrant
- NG = Next Gen Accelerator Program entrant
- w/o = Walkover
- r = Retired
- d = Defaulted

=== Finals ===
Semifinals
5	(Switzerland) Henri Laaksonen	6	6
(Netherlands) Robin Haase	4	4
4	(Switzerland) Alexander Ritschard	6^{8}	6	6
Q	(France) Matteo Martineau	7^{10}	4	2

Final
5	(Switzerland) Henri Laaksonen	5	5^{r}
4	(Switzerland) Alexander Ritschard	7	6

=== Top half ===
First round
1	(France) G Barrère	4	6	6
Alt	(Belgium) R Collignon	6	1	2
SE	(Germany) MH Rehberg	7^{7}	6
(United Kingdom) B Harris	6^{3}	2
(Lebanon) B Hassan	6	3	6
E Karlovskiy	3	6	4
A Vatutin	4	6	2
5	(Switzerland) H Laaksonen	6	2	6
3	(Austria) D Novak	6	1	6^{3}
Q	(Germany) J Lenz	4	6	7^{7}
Q	E Donskoy	6	6
(France) H Mayot	3	3
(Netherlands) R Haase	6	6
Q	(Turkey) E Kırkın	2	4
(Portugal) F Ferreira Silva	4	6	7^{7}
8	(Ukraine) O Krutykh	6	3	6^{4}

Second round
1	(France) G Barrère	6	6
SE	(Germany) MH Rehberg	2	1
(Lebanon) B Hassan	4	6	6^{6}
5	(Switzerland) H Laaksonen	6	3	7^{8}
Q	(Germany) J Lenz	6	6^{3}	7
Q	E Donskoy	2	7^{7}	5
(Netherlands) R Haase	6^{4}	6	7^{7}
(Portugal) F Ferreira Silva	7^{7}	4	6^{4}

Quarterfinals
1	(France) G Barrère	2	4
5	(Switzerland) H Laaksonen	6	6
Q	(Germany) J Lenz	4	6	6^{4}
(Netherlands) R Haase	6	4	7^{7}

Semifinals
5	(Switzerland) H Laaksonen	6	6
(Netherlands) R Haase	4	4

=== Bottom half ===
First round
7	(Czech Republic) J Forejtek	6	6
(Italy) S Caruso	3	2
(Croatia) D Ajduković	7^{7}	6
(Germany) H Squire	6^{0}	1
(Portugal) J Domingues	3	1
Q	(Czech Republic) A Paulson	6	6
WC	(Germany) R Molleker	5	4
4	(Switzerland) A Ritschard	7	6
6	(Turkey) A Çelikbilek	6	6^{4}	6^{5}
Q	(France) M Martineau	2	7^{7}	7^{7}
Q	(Germany) Jeremy Jahn	6	4	3
WC	(Germany) M Topo	3	6	6
WC	(Germany) N Kuhn	7^{7}	1
(Germany) M Moraing	6^{1}	0^{r}
(Poland) K Żuk	6^{3}	2
2	(Netherlands) J Sels	7^{7}	6

Second round
7	(Czech Republic) J Forejtek	6	7^{12}
(Croatia) D Ajduković	2	6^{10}
Q	(Czech Republic) A Paulson	1	0
4	(Switzerland) A Ritschard	6	6
Q	(France) M Martineau	4	6	7
WC	(Germany) M Topo	6	2	5
WC	(Germany) N Kuhn	6	4	1
2	(Netherlands) J Sels	4	6	6

Quarterfinals
7	(Czech Republic) J Forejtek	6	5	4
4	(Switzerland) A Ritschard	4	7	6
Q	(France) M Martineau	7^{8}	6
2	(Netherlands) J Sels	6^{6}	3

Semifinals
4	(Switzerland) A Ritschard	6^{8}	6	6
Q	(France) M Martineau	7^{10}	4	2
