= 2025 BOSS Open =

- Date: 9–15 June
- Edition: 47th
- Category: ATP 250
- Draw: 28S / 16D
- Prize money: €751,630
- Surface: Grass
- Location: Stuttgart, Germany
- Venue: Tennis Club Weissenhof

Champions

Singles
- (United States) Taylor Fritz

Doubles
- (Mexico) Santiago González / (United States) Austin Krajicek
← 2024 ·	Stuttgart Open	· 2026 →

The 2025 BOSS Open was a men's tennis tournament played on outdoor grass courts. It was the 47th edition of the Stuttgart Open and an ATP 250 tournament of the 2025 ATP Tour. It was held at the Tennis Club Weissenhof in Stuttgart, Germany, from 9 June until 15 June 2025.

== Champions ==
=== Singles ===
- (United States) Taylor Fritz def. (Germany) Alexander Zverev, 6–3, 7–6^{(7–0)}

=== Doubles ===
- (Mexico) Santiago González / (United States) Austin Krajicek def. (United States) Alex Michelsen / (United States) Rajeev Ram, 6–4, 6–4

== Point distribution ==
Event	W	F	SF	QF	R16	R32	Q	Q2	Q1
Singles	250	165	100	50	25	0	13	7	0
Doubles	250	150	90	45	0	—	—	—	—

== Singles main draw entrants ==
=== Seeds ===
Country	Player	Rank	Seed
GER	Alexander Zverev	3	1
USA	Taylor Fritz	4	2
USA	Ben Shelton	13	3
CAN	Félix Auger-Aliassime	27	4
CAN	Denis Shapovalov	31	5
USA	Brandon Nakashima	32	6
USA	Alex Michelsen	33	7
CZE	Jiří Lehečka	34	8

- Rankings are as of 26 May 2025.

=== Other entrants ===
The following players received wildcards into the main draw:

- (Germany) Justin Engel
- (Italy) Fabio Fognini
- (Germany) Jan-Lennard Struff

The following players received entry from the qualifying draw:

- (Australia) James Duckworth
- (Hungary) Márton Fucsovics
- (Germany) Yannick Hanfmann
- (France) Pierre-Hugues Herbert

=== Withdrawals ===
- (Italy) Matteo Berrettini → replaced by Roman Safiullin
- (Australia) Nick Kyrgios → replaced by (France) Corentin Moutet
- (Italy) Lorenzo Musetti → replaced by (Japan) Yoshihito Nishioka
- (United States) Tommy Paul → replaced by (United Kingdom) Jacob Fearnley
- (United States) Frances Tiafoe → replaced by (France) Benjamin Bonzi

== Doubles main draw entrants ==
=== Seeds ===
Country	Player	Country	Player	Rank	Seed
GER	Kevin Krawietz	GER	Tim Pütz	11	1
FRA	Sadio Doumbia	FRA	Fabien Reboul	48	2
IND	Rohan Bopanna	BEL	Sander Gillé	76	3
BRA	Rafael Matos	BRA	Marcelo Melo	79	4

- Rankings are as of 26 May 2025.

=== Other entrants ===
The following pairs received wildcards into the doubles main draw:

- (Germany) Justin Engel / (Germany) Jan-Lennard Struff
- (Germany) Yannick Hanfmann / (Germany) Andreas Mies

=== Withdrawals ===
- (El Salvador) Marcelo Arévalo / (Croatia) Mate Pavić → replaced by (Germany) Jakob Schnaitter / (Germany) Mark Wallner
- (Italy) Simone Bolelli / (Italy) Andrea Vavassori → replaced by (India) Sriram Balaji / (Mexico) Miguel Ángel Reyes-Varela
- (United States) Christian Harrison / (United States) Evan King → replaced by (Mexico) Santiago González / (United States) Austin Krajicek
- (Italy) Lorenzo Musetti / (Italy) Lorenzo Sonego → replaced by (Italy) Matteo Arnaldi / (Italy) Lorenzo Sonego
