= 2023 Tennis Open Karlsruhe – Doubles =

Doubles
- 2023 Tennis Open Karlsruhe

Final
- Champions: (Austria) Neil Oberleitner (Germany) Tim Sandkaulen
- Runners-up: (Czech Republic) Vít Kopřiva (Greece) Michail Pervolarakis
- Score: 6–1, 6–1

Events
Singles	Doubles
- Tennis Open Karlsruhe

This was the first edition of the tournament.

Neil Oberleitner and Tim Sandkaulen won the title after defeating Vít Kopřiva and Michail Pervolarakis 6–1, 6–1 in the final.

== Seeds ==
1. (Czech Republic) Roman Jebavý / (Netherlands) Sem Verbeek (first round)
2. (Poland) Karol Drzewiecki / (Czech Republic) Petr Nouza (withdrew)
3. Ivan Liutarevich / (Ukraine) Vladyslav Manafov (quarterfinals)
4. (Netherlands) Sander Arends / (Switzerland) Luca Margaroli (first round)
5. (Spain) Íñigo Cervantes / (Spain) Oriol Roca Batalla (semifinals)

== Draw ==
Key

- Q = Qualifier
- WC = Wild card
- LL = Lucky loser
- Alt = Alternate
- ITF = ITF entry
- PR = Protected ranking
- SR = Special ranking
- SE = Special exempt
- JE = Junior exempt
- JR = Junior Accelerator Programme entrant
- CO = College Accelerator Programme entrant
- NG = Next Gen Accelerator Program entrant
- w/o = Walkover
- r = Retired
- d = Defaulted

First round
1	(Czech Republic) R Jebavý (Netherlands) S Verbeek	3	3
(Austria) N Oberleitner (Germany) T Sandkaulen	6	6
(Latvia) M Lībietis (Poland) S Walków	6	6
WC	(Germany) Liam Gavrielides (Germany) D Masur	4	4
4	(Netherlands) S Arends (Switzerland) L Margaroli	4	7^{7}	[6]
Alt	(Argentina) H Casanova (Argentina) JP Ficovich	6	6^{4}	[10]
(Switzerland) L Riedi (Ukraine) V Sachko	2	3
(Poland) P Matuszewski (Australia) MC Romios	6	6
(Czech Republic) V Kopřiva (Greece) M Pervolarakis	7	6
(Brazil) F Romboli (Brazil) M Zormann	5	3
(Belgium) M Geerts (Mexico) H Hach Verdugo	6	5	[6]
3	I Liutarevich (Ukraine) V Manafov	4	7	[10]
WC	(Ukraine) Viacheslav Bielinskyi (United States) Dali Blanch	1	1
(France) G Blancaneaux (France) B Paire	6	6
(Germany) R Molleker (Australia) A Santillan	6	5	[10]
5	(Spain) Í Cervantes (Spain) O Roca Batalla	4	7	[12]

Quarterfinals
(Austria) N Oberleitner (Germany) T Sandkaulen	3	7^{7}	[11]
(Latvia) M Lībietis (Poland) S Walków	6	6^{5}	[9]
Alt	(Argentina) H Casanova (Argentina) JP Ficovich	1	4
(Poland) P Matuszewski (Australia) MC Romios	6	6
(Czech Republic) V Kopřiva (Greece) M Pervolarakis	7	1	[10]
3	I Liutarevich (Ukraine) V Manafov	5	6	[7]
(France) G Blancaneaux (France) B Paire	1	7^{8}	[7]
5	(Spain) Í Cervantes (Spain) O Roca Batalla	6	6^{6}	[10]

Semifinals
(Austria) N Oberleitner (Germany) T Sandkaulen	6	4	[10]
(Poland) P Matuszewski (Australia) MC Romios	3	6	[4]
(Czech Republic) V Kopřiva (Greece) M Pervolarakis	7	6
5	(Spain) Í Cervantes (Spain) O Roca Batalla	5	4

Final
(Austria) N Oberleitner (Germany) T Sandkaulen	6	6
(Czech Republic) V Kopřiva (Greece) M Pervolarakis	1	1
