= 2023 Tennis Open Karlsruhe =

- Date: 3 – 9 July
- Edition: 1st
- Surface: Clay
- Location: Karlsruhe, Germany

Champions

Singles
- (Chile) Alejandro Tabilo

Doubles
- (Austria) Neil Oberleitner / (Germany) Tim Sandkaulen
Tennis Open Karlsruhe	· 2024 →

The 2023 Tennis Open Karlsruhe was a professional tennis tournament played on clay courts. It was the first edition of the tournament which was part of the 2023 ATP Challenger Tour. It took place in Karlsruhe, Germany between 3 and 9 July 2023.

== Singles main-draw entrants ==
=== Seeds ===
Country	Player	Rank^{1}	Seed
HUN	Zsombor Piros	112	1
	Pavel Kotov	116	2
ESP	Pedro Martínez	122	3
ITA	Giulio Zeppieri	125	4
BRA	Thiago Seyboth Wild	131	5
KAZ	Timofey Skatov	138	6
	Ivan Gakhov	143	7
CHI	Alejandro Tabilo	144	8

- ^{1} Rankings are as of 26 June 2023.

=== Other entrants ===
The following players received wildcards into the singles main draw:

- (Germany) Liam Gavrielides
- (Germany) Henri Squire
- (Germany) Marko Topo

The following players received entry from the qualifying draw:

- (United States) Dali Blanch
- (Lebanon) Hady Habib
- (Germany) Tim Handel
- (Spain) Oriol Roca Batalla
- (Australia) Akira Santillan
- (Kazakhstan) Denis Yevseyev

== Champions ==
=== Singles ===
- (Chile) Alejandro Tabilo def. (Italy) Giulio Zeppieri 2–6, 1–0 ret.

=== Doubles ===
- (Austria) Neil Oberleitner / (Germany) Tim Sandkaulen def. (Czech Republic) Vít Kopřiva / (Greece) Michail Pervolarakis 6–1, 6–1.
