= 2020 Tennis Challenger Hamburg =

- Date: 26 October – 1 November
- Edition: 2nd
- Surface: Hard (indoor)
- Location: Hamburg, Germany

Champions

Singles
- (Japan) Taro Daniel

Doubles
- (Switzerland) Marc-Andrea Hüsler / (Poland) Kamil Majchrzak
- Tennis Challenger Hamburg

The 2020 Tennis Challenger Hamburg presented by Tannenhof was a professional tennis tournament played on indoor hard courts. It was the second edition of the tournament which was part of the 2020 ATP Challenger Tour. It took place in Hamburg, Germany between 26 October and 1 November 2020.

== Singles main-draw entrants ==
=== Seeds ===
Country	Player	Rank^{1}	Seed
POL	Kamil Majchrzak	105	1
JPN	Taro Daniel	121	2
USA	J. J. Wolf	122	3
GER	Daniel Altmaier	124	4
IND	Sumit Nagal	130	5
SUI	Henri Laaksonen	132	6
SRB	Nikola Milojević	135	7
GER	Oscar Otte	141	8

- ^{1} Rankings are as of 19 October 2020.

=== Other entrants ===
The following players received wildcards into the singles main draw:

- (Germany) Daniel Altmaier
- (Germany) Maximilian Marterer
- ~~(Germany) Daniel Masur~~

The following player received entry into the singles main draw using a protected ranking:

- (Germany) Dustin Brown

The following players received entry into the singles main draw as special exempts:

- (France) Benjamin Bonzi
- (Croatia) Borna Gojo

The following players received entry from the qualifying draw:

- (Germany) Matthias Bachinger
- (Germany) Tobias Kamke
- (Russia) Pavel Kotov
- (Italy) Stefano Napolitano

The following players received entry as lucky losers:

- (France) Hugo Gaston
- (Ukraine) Illya Marchenko

== Champions ==
=== Singles ===
- (Japan) Taro Daniel def. (Austria) Sebastian Ofner 6–1, 6–2.

=== Doubles ===
- (Switzerland) Marc-Andrea Hüsler / (Poland) Kamil Majchrzak def. (United Kingdom) Lloyd Glasspool / (United States) Alex Lawson 6–3, 1–6, [20–18].
