= 2022 Hamburg Ladies & Gents Cup =

Tennis tournament

- Date: 17–23 October 2022
- Edition: 3rd
- Category: ATP Challenger Tour; ITF Women's World Tennis Tour
- Surface: Hard (Indoor)
- Location: Hamburg, Germany

Champions

Men's singles
- (Switzerland) Alexander Ritschard

Women's singles
- (Spain) Rebeka Masarova

Men's doubles
- (Philippines) Treat Huey / (United States) Max Schnur

Women's doubles
- (Czech Republic) Miriam Kolodziejová / (Czech Republic) Jesika Malečková
- Hamburg Ladies & Gents Cup

The 2022 Hamburg Ladies & Gents Cup was a professional tennis tournament played on indoor hard courts. It was the third edition of the tournament which was part of the 2022 ATP Challenger Tour and the 2022 ITF Women's World Tennis Tour. It took place in Hamburg, Germany between 17 and 23 October 2022.

== Champions ==
=== Men's singles ===
- (Switzerland) Alexander Ritschard def. (Switzerland) Henri Laaksonen 7–5, 6–5 ret.

=== Women's singles ===
- (Spain) Rebeka Masarova def. (Belgium) Ysaline Bonaventure, 6–4, 6–3

=== Men's doubles ===
- (Philippines) Treat Huey / (United States) Max Schnur def. (Jamaica) Dustin Brown / (Germany) Julian Lenz 7–6^{(8–6)}, 6–4.

=== Women's doubles ===
- (Czech Republic) Miriam Kolodziejová / (Czech Republic) Jesika Malečková def. (Slovenia) Veronika Erjavec / (Norway) Malene Helgø, 6–4, 6–2

== Men's singles main draw entrants ==
=== Seeds ===
Country	Player	Rank^{1}	Seed
FRA	Grégoire Barrère	119	1
NED	Jelle Sels	141	2
AUT	Dennis Novak	145	3
SUI	Alexander Ritschard	182	4
SUI	Henri Laaksonen	183	5
TUR	Altuğ Çelikbilek	230	6
CZE	Jonáš Forejtek	238	7
UKR	Oleksii Krutykh	246	8

- ^{1} Rankings are as of 10 October 2022.

=== Other entrants ===
The following players received wildcards into the singles main draw:

- (Germany) Nicola Kuhn
- (Germany) Rudolf Molleker
- (Germany) Marko Topo

The following player received entry into the singles main draw as a special exempt:

- (Germany) Max Hans Rehberg

The following player received entry into the singles main draw as an alternate:

- (Belgium) Raphaël Collignon

The following players received entry from the qualifying draw:

- Evgeny Donskoy
- (Germany) Jeremy Jahn
- (Turkey) Ergi Kırkın
- (Germany) Julian Lenz
- (France) Matteo Martineau
- (Czech Republic) Andrew Paulson

== Women's singles main draw entrants ==
=== Seeds ===
Country	Player	Rank^{1}	Seed
BEL	Ysaline Bonaventure	126	1
~~UKR~~	~~Kateryna Baindl~~	~~133~~	~~2~~
ITA	Lucrezia Stefanini	140	3
GRE	Despina Papamichail	152	4
GEO	Ekaterine Gorgodze	161	5
ESP	Rebeka Masarova	180	6
GER	Nastasja Schunk	211	7
	Anastasia Tikhonova	234	8

- ^{1} Rankings are as of 10 October 2022.

=== Other entrants ===
The following players received wildcards into the singles main draw:

- (Germany) Mara Guth
- (Germany) Carolina Kuhl
- (Germany) Ella Seidel
- (Germany) Joëlle Steur

The following players received entry from the qualifying draw:

- (Norway) Malene Helgø
- (Germany) Julia Middendorf
- (Germany) Tayisiya Morderger
- (Germany) Yana Morderger
- (Czech Republic) Tereza Smitková
- (Germany) Julia Stusek
- (Romania) Arina Vasilescu
- Ekaterina Yashina

The following players received entry as lucky losers:

- (Germany) Selina Dal
- (Germany) Anna Klasen
