= 2022 Hamburg Ladies & Gents Cup – Women's singles =

Women's singles
- 2022 Hamburg Ladies & Gents Cup

Final
- Champion: (Spain) Rebeka Masarova
- Runner-up: (Belgium) Ysaline Bonaventure
- Score: 6–4, 6–3

Events
Singles	men	women
Doubles	men	women
- Hamburg Ladies & Gents Cup

Antonia Ružić was the defending champion but chose not to participate.

Rebeka Masarova won the title, defeating Ysaline Bonaventure in the final, 6–4, 6–3.

== Seeds ==
1. (Belgium) Ysaline Bonaventure (final)
2. (Ukraine) Kateryna Baindl (withdrew)
3. (Italy) Lucrezia Stefanini (first round)
4. (Greece) Despina Papamichail (second round)
5. (Georgia (country)) Ekaterine Gorgodze (first round)
6. (Spain) Rebeka Masarova (champion)
7. (Germany) Nastasja Schunk (first round)
8. Anastasia Tikhonova (quarterfinals)

== Draw ==
Key

- Q = Qualifier
- WC = Wild card
- LL = Lucky loser
- Alt = Alternate
- ITF = ITF entry
- PR = Protected ranking
- SR = Special ranking
- SE = Special exempt
- JE = Junior exempt
- JR = Junior Accelerator Programme entrant
- CO = College Accelerator Programme entrant
- NG = Next Gen Accelerator Program entrant
- w/o = Walkover
- r = Retired
- d = Defaulted

=== Finals ===
Semifinals
1	(Belgium) Ysaline Bonaventure	6	3
Q	(Czech Republic) Tereza Smitková	2	1^{r}
6	(Spain) Rebeka Masarova	4	7^{7}	6
(Turkey) Berfu Cengiz	6	6^{2}	1

Final
1	(Belgium) Ysaline Bonaventure	4	3
6	(Spain) Rebeka Masarova	6	6

=== Top half ===
First round
1	(Belgium) Y Bonaventure	6	6
(Croatia) J Fett	4	4
E Kazionova	6	4	4
(Philippines) A Eala	2	6	6
Q	(Norway) M Helgø	3	6	7^{7}
E Makarova	6	3	6^{4}
(Germany) N Noha Akugue	1	4
8	A Tikhonova	6	6
3	(Italy) L Stefanini	3	4
Q	E Yashina	6	6
(Czech Republic) J Malečková	3	6	5
Q	(Czech Republic) T Smitková	6	1	7
(Latvia) D Vismane	6	7^{7}
LL	(Germany) S Dal	3	6^{4}
Q	(Germany) Y Morderger	6	5	6
7	(Germany) N Schunk	4	7	3

Second round
1	(Belgium) Y Bonaventure	6	6
(Philippines) A Eala	4	0
Q	(Norway) M Helgø	4	2
8	A Tikhonova	6	6
Q	E Yashina	2	6	5
Q	(Czech Republic) T Smitková	6	3	7
(Latvia) D Vismane	7^{7}	4	2
Q	(Germany) Y Morderger	6^{3}	6	6

Quarterfinals
1	(Belgium) Y Bonaventure	6	6
8	A Tikhonova	1	3
Q	(Czech Republic) T Smitková	6	6
Q	(Germany) Y Morderger	2	2

Semifinals
1	(Belgium) Y Bonaventure	6	3
Q	(Czech Republic) T Smitková	2	1^{r}

=== Bottom half ===
First round
6	(Spain) R Masarova	2	6	6
(Germany) S Wagner	6	4	1
WC	(Germany) M Guth	6	7^{7}
WC	(Germany) Jo Steur	4	6^{3}
Q	(Germany) J Middendorf	5	7	6
WC	(Germany) C Kuhl	7	5	1
(Slovenia) V Erjavec	6	2	3
4	(Greece) D Papamichail	3	6	6
5	(Georgia (country)) E Gorgodze	5	2
WC	(Germany) E Seidel	7	6
Q	(Germany) J Stusek	6	6
Q	(Romania) A Vasilescu	2	0
(Germany) M Barthel	6^{9}	6^{5}
Q	(Germany) T Morderger	7^{11}	7^{7}
(Turkey) B Cengiz	6	6
LL	(Germany) A Klasen	1	1

Second round
6	(Spain) R Masarova	7^{8}	3	6
WC	(Germany) M Guth	6^{6}	6	3
Q	(Germany) J Middendorf	7^{7}	3	6
4	(Greece) D Papamichail	6^{3}	6	4
WC	(Germany) E Seidel	2	6	6
Q	(Germany) J Stusek	6	3	4
Q	(Germany) T Morderger	3	2
(Turkey) B Cengiz	6	6

Quarterfinals
6	(Spain) R Masarova	4	6	6
Q	(Germany) J Middendorf	6	2	1
WC	(Germany) E Seidel	6	4	0^{r}
(Turkey) B Cengiz	4	6	1

Semifinals
6	(Spain) R Masarova	4	7^{7}	6
(Turkey) B Cengiz	6	6^{2}	1
