= Tim Sandkaulen =

German tennis player

- Country (sports): Germany
- Born: 29 December 1997 (age 28) Mönchengladbach, Germany
- Height: 1.58 m (5 ft 2 in)
- Plays: Right-handed (one-handed backhand)
- College: Ole Miss
- Prize money: $31,730

Singles
- Career record: 0–0
- Career titles: 0
- Highest ranking: No. 977 (10 April 2023)

Doubles
- Career record: 0–0
- Career titles: 1 Challenger, 4 Futures
- Highest ranking: No. 172 (25 September 2023)

Tim Sandkaulen (born 29 December 1997) is a retired German tennis player who specialized in doubles.

Sandkaulen had a career high ATP doubles ranking of world No. 172 achieved on 25 September 2023.

He played college tennis at Ole Miss.

== Career ==
Sandkaulen won one ATP Challenger doubles title at the 2023 Tennis Open Karlsruhe with Neil Oberleitner.

== ATP Challenger and ITF Futures/World Tennis Tour finals ==
=== Doubles: 12 (5–7) ===
Legend ATP Challenger (1–2) ITF Futures/World Tennis Tour (4–5)	Finals by surface Hard (1–2) Clay (4–4) Grass (0–0) Carpet (0–1)

Result	W–L	Date	Tournament	Tier	Surface	Partner	Opponents	Score
Loss	0–1	Nov 2015	Ismaning, Germany	Futures	Carpet (i)	(Germany) Kevin Krawietz	(Austria) Alexander Erler (Germany) Constantin Frantzen	6–2, 6–7^{(5–7)}, [8–10]
Loss	0–2	Apr 2022	M15 Monastir, Tunisia	World Tour	Hard	(Germany) Constantin Frantzen	(Poland) Szymon Kielan (Poland) Michał Mikuła	6–7^{(4–7)}, 7–6^{(7–2)}, [2–10]
Win	1–2	May 2022	M15 Meerbusch, Germany	World Tour	Clay	(Germany) Constantin Frantzen	(Chile) Miguel Fernando Pereira (Brazil) Gabriel Roveri Sidney	7–6^{(7–5)}, 6–4
Win	2–2	May 2022	M25 Most, Czech Republic	World Tour	Clay	(Germany) Constantin Frantzen	(Czech Republic) Marek Gengel (Czech Republic) David Poljak	6–3, 4–6, [10–7]
Loss	2–3	Jun 2022	M25 Arlon, Belgium	World Tour	Clay	(Germany) Constantin Frantzen	(India) Anirudh Chandrasekar (India) Vijay Sundar Prashanth	6–7^{(5–7)}, 4–6
Win	3–3	Jul 2022	M25 Kassel, Germany	World Tour	Clay	(Germany) Constantin Frantzen	(Germany) Tom Gentzsch (Germany) Leopold Zima	6–4, 6–2
Loss	3–4	Aug 2022	M25 Wetzlar, Germany	World Tour	Clay	(Germany) Constantin Frantzen	(Lebanon) Benjamin Hassan (France) Tristan Lamasine	4–6, 3–6
Loss	3–5	Nov 2022	M25 Heraklion, Greece	World Tour	Hard	(Bulgaria) Alexander Donski	(Austria) Sandro Kopp (Austria) Neil Oberleitner	7–6^{(7–2)}, 3–6, [7–10]
Win	4–5	Nov 2022	M25 Heraklion, Greece	World Tour	Hard	(Austria) Neil Oberleitner	(Israel) Daniel Cukierman (Ukraine) Volodymyr Uzhylovskyi	6–2, 7–6^{(7–5)}
Loss	0–1	Jun 2023	Bratislava, Slovakia	Challenger	Clay	(Austria) Neil Oberleitner	(Uruguay) Ariel Behar (Czech Republic) Adam Pavlásek	4–6, 4–6
Win	1–1	Jul 2023	Karlsruhe, Germany	Challenger	Clay	(Austria) Neil Oberleitner	(Czech Republic) Vít Kopřiva (Greece) Michail Pervolarakis	6–1, 6–1
Loss	1–2	Aug 2023	Liberec, Czech Republic	Challenger	Clay	(Austria) Neil Oberleitner	(Czech Republic) Petr Nouza (Czech Republic) Andrew Paulson	3–6, 4–6
