= 2026 Hamburg Ladies & Gents Cup =

- Date: 10–16 August
- Edition: 7th
- Category: ATP Challenger Tour; ITF Women's World Tennis Tour
- Surface: Clay
- Location: Hamburg, Germany

Champions

Men's singles
- (Czech Republic) Jan Kumstát

Women's singles
- (Czech Republic) Anna Sisková

Men's doubles
- (Croatia) Admir Kalender / (Croatia) Nino Serdarušić

Women's doubles
- (Japan) Momoko Kobori / (Japan) Ayano Shimizu
- Hamburg Ladies & Gents Cup

The 2026 Hamburg Ladies & Gents Cup was a professional tennis tournament played on clay courts. It was the seventh edition of the tournament which was part of the 2026 ATP Challenger Tour and the 2026 ITF Women's World Tennis Tour. It took place in Hamburg, Germany between 10 and 16 August 2026.

== Champions ==
=== Men's singles ===
- (Czech Republic) Jan Kumstát def. (Germany) Marvin Möller 4–6, 7–6^{(7–5)}, 7–5.

=== Women's singles ===
- (Czech Republic) Anna Sisková def. (United States) Rasheeda McAdoo 7–6^{(8–6)}, 1–6, 6–3

=== Men's doubles ===
- (Croatia) Admir Kalender / (Croatia) Nino Serdarušić def. (Germany) Niels McDonald / (Germany) Jannik Opitz 6–3, 6–4.

=== Women's doubles ===
- (Japan) Momoko Kobori / (Japan) Ayano Shimizu def. (Ukraine) Valeriya Strakhova / Anastasia Tikhonova 6–4, 6–2

== Men's singles main draw entrants ==
=== Seeds ===
Country	Player	Rank^{1}	Seed
HUN	Zsombor Piros	123	1
ESP	Max Alcalá Gurri	171	2
DEN	Elmer Møller	184	3
~~GER~~	~~Tom Gentzsch~~	~~185~~	~~4~~
UKR	Vitaliy Sachko	189	5
GER	Diego Dedura	193	6
IND	Sumit Nagal	235	7
ITA	Raúl Brancaccio	237	8

- ^{1} Rankings are as of 3 August 2026.

=== Other entrants ===
The following players received wildcards into the singles main draw:

- (Germany) Jamie Mackenzie
- (Germany) Rudolf Molleker
- (Germany) Mika Petkovic

The following player received entry into the singles main draw using a protected ranking:

- (Germany) Max Hans Rehberg

The following player received entry into the singles main draw through the College Accelerator programme:

- (Switzerland) Dylan Dietrich

The following player received entry into the singles main draw through the Junior Accelerator programme:

- (Germany) Niels McDonald

The following players received entry into the singles main draw as alternates:

- (Germany) Marvin Möller
- (Brazil) Eduardo Ribeiro
- (Germany) Max Schönhaus

The following players received entry from the qualifying draw:

- (Turkey) Ergi Kırkın
- (Ukraine) Oleksii Krutykh
- (Czech Republic) Jan Kumstát
- (Poland) Fryderyk Lechno-Wasiutyński
- (Sweden) Olle Wallin
- (Kazakhstan) Denis Yevseyev

The following player received entry as a lucky loser:

- (Georgia (country)) Saba Purtseladze
