= Tennis Open Karlsruhe =

- 2024 Tennis Open Karlsruhe

ATP Challenger Tour
- Event name: Tennis Open Karlsruhe
- Location: Karlsruhe, Germany
- Category: ATP Challenger Tour
- Surface: Clay

The Tennis Open Karlsruhe is a professional tennis tournament played on clay courts. It is currently part of the ATP Challenger Tour. It was first held in Karlsruhe, Germany in 2023.

== Past finals ==
=== Singles ===
Year	Champion	Runner-up	Score
2023	(Chile) Alejandro Tabilo	(Italy) Giulio Zeppieri	2–6, 1–0 ret.
2024	(Slovakia) Jozef Kovalík	(Argentina) Camilo Ugo Carabelli	6–3, 7–6^{(7–2)}

=== Doubles ===
Year	Champions	Runners-up	Score
2023	(Austria) Neil Oberleitner (Germany) Tim Sandkaulen	(Czech Republic) Vít Kopřiva (Greece) Michail Pervolarakis	6–1, 6–1
2024	(Germany) Jakob Schnaitter (Germany) Mark Wallner	(France) Dan Added (France) Grégoire Jacq	6–4, 6–0
