= Niels McDonald =

German tennis player (born 2008)

- Country (sports): Germany
- Residence: Schwerin, Germany
- Born: 26 January 2008 (age 18) Cardiff, Wales
- Height: 1.91 m (6 ft 3 in)
- Plays: Right-handed (two-handed backhand)
- Prize money: US $61,236

Singles
- Career record: 0–1 (at ATP Tour level, Grand Slam level, and in Davis Cup)
- Career titles: 0
- Highest ranking: No. 448 (16 November 2026)
- Current ranking: No. 448 (16 November 2026)

Grand Slam singles results
- Australian Open Junior: 1R (2025)
- French Open Junior: W (2025)
- Wimbledon Junior: 2R (2025)
- US Open Junior: 1R (2025)

Doubles
- Career record: 0–0 (at ATP Tour level, Grand Slam level, and in Davis Cup)
- Career titles: 0
- Highest ranking: No. 504 (19 October 2026)
- Current ranking: No. 591 (16 November 2026)

Grand Slam doubles results
- Australian Open Junior: QF (2025)
- French Open Junior: 1R (2025)
- Wimbledon Junior: 1R (2025)
- US Open Junior: QF (2025)
- Last updated on: 16 November 2026.

Niels McDonald (born 26 January 2008) is a German tennis player. He has a career-high ATP singles ranking of No. 448 achieved on 16 November 2026 and a best doubles ranking of No. 504 achieved on 19 October 2026.

McDonald won the boys' singles title at the 2025 French Open.

== Early life ==
McDonald was born in Cardiff, Wales, to a German mother and a Scottish father. He lived near London until the age of four, when his family moved to Schwerin, Germany.

== Junior career ==
McDonald had significant results on ITF junior circuit. In May 2024, he won both the singles and doubles titles at the J200 tournament in Hanover. The following month, he and compatriot Diego Dedura-Palomero won the doubles title at the J300 tournament in Bamberg. The German also won the singles title and reached the semifinals in doubles at the J200 Babolat Cup in Plzeň.

In January 2025, McDonald and compatriot Jamie Mackenzie reached the boys' doubles quarterfinals of the Australian Open. The following month, at the J200 Bavarian Junior Winter Championships in Oberhaching, he reached the quarterfinals in singles and won the doubles title with compatriot Max Schönhaus. That March, he and Mackenzie won back-to-back J200 doubles titles in Valencia and Benicarló, Spain.

In June of that season, McDonald won the boys' singles title at the French Open, upsetting top seed Andrés Santamarta Roig in the process and defeating Schönhaus in the final. He was the first German boy to win a French Open singles title since Daniel Elsner in 1997, and the first to lift a major jr. title in singles since Alexander Zverev in 2014. In September 2025, he defeated Yannick Alexandrescou in the singles final of the U18 European Junior Championships.

He reached an ITF junior combined ranking of world No. 4 on 9 June 2025.

== Professional career ==
In July 2024, McDonald made his ATP Challenger Tour debut with a wildcard into the doubles main draw of the Brawo Open, partnering compatriot Nicola Kuhn; they reached the quarterfinals. In July 2026, he made his ATP Tour main draw debut at the Croatia Open Umag as a wild card.

== Personal life ==
McDonald currently trains at Good to Great Tennis Academy and plays for Oldenburger TeV in the 2. Tennis-Bundesliga.

== ATP Challenger Tour finals ==
=== Doubles: 1 (runner-up) ===
Finals by surface
Hard (0–0)
Clay (0–1)

Result	W–L	Date	Tournament	Tier	Surface	Partner	Opponents	Score
Loss	0–1	Aug 2026	Hamburg Ladies & Gents Cup, Germany	Challenger	Clay	(Germany) Jannik Opitz	(Croatia) Admir Kalender (Croatia) Nino Serdarušić	3–6, 4–6

== ITF World Tennis Tour finals ==
=== Singles: 2 (2 titles) ===
Result	W–L	Date	Tournament	Surface	Opponent	Score
Win	1–0	Jun 2026	M15 Rosbach, Germany	Clay	(Germany) Kai Wehnelt	6–7^{(2–7)}, 6–3, 6–4
Win	2–0	Jun 2026	M25 Värnamo, Sweden	Clay	(Austria) Sandro Kopp	7–6^{(7–5)}, 6–4

=== Doubles: 1 (title) ===
Result	W–L	Date	Tournament	Surface	Partner	Opponents	Score
Win	1–0	Apr 2026	M25 Pula, Italy	Clay	(Turkey) Ergi Kırkın	(South Africa) Philip Henning (Bulgaria) Yanaki Milev	6–1, 6–3

== Junior Grand Slam finals ==
=== Singles: 1 (title) ===
Result	Year	Tournament	Surface	Opponent	Score
Win	2025	French Open	Clay	(Germany) Max Schönhaus	6–7^{(5–7)}, 6–0, 6–3
