= Justin Engel =

German tennis player (born 2007)

- Country (sports): Germany
- Born: 1 October 2007 (age 18) Nuremberg, Germany
- Height: 1.88 m (6 ft 2 in)
- Turned pro: 2024
- Plays: Right-handed (two-handed backhand)
- Coach: Dieter Kindlmann
- Prize money: US $550,649

Singles
- Career record: 6–11 (at ATP Tour level, Grand Slam level, and in Davis Cup)
- Career titles: 0
- Highest ranking: No. 180 (5 January 2026)
- Current ranking: No. 218 (8 June 2026)

Grand Slam singles results
- Australian Open: Q1 (2026)
- US Open: Q1 (2025)

Doubles
- Career record: 2–4 (at ATP Tour level, Grand Slam level, and in Davis Cup)
- Career titles: 0
- Highest ranking: No. 280 (23 June 2025)

Team competitions
- Davis Cup: Q2 (2025)
- Last updated on: 9 June 2026.

Justin Engel (born 1 October 2007) is a German professional tennis player. He has a career-high ATP singles ranking of world No. 180 achieved on 5 January 2026 and a best doubles ranking of No. 280, reached on 23 June 2025.

== Professional career ==
=== 2023: Maiden ITF title ===
In May, at the age of 16, Engel became the youngest German men's title winner since 2003 when he won an ITF World Tennis Tour tournament in Villach, Austria.

=== 2024: ATP Tour debut ===
In July, Engel made his Challenger main draw debut at the Tennis Open Karlsruhe, having received a wildcard. He defeated world No. 138 and five-time major doubles champion Pierre-Hugues Herbert in the first round to claim his first Challenger main draw win and first top-150 win.

In October, at the age of 17, Engel made his ATP Tour main draw debut at the Almaty Open after receiving a main draw wildcard. He defeated Coleman Wong in straight sets to claim his first ATP Tour main draw win, becoming the youngest player to do so since Carlos Alcaraz at the 2020 Rio Open and the first player born in the year 2007 to win an ATP match.

=== 2025: ATP quarterfinal, Challenger title, top 200 ===
In May, at the 2025 Hamburg Open where he entered the main draw as wildcard, Engel defeated compatriot Jan-Lennard Struff to record only his second ATP Tour level win.

In June, at 17 years and eight months, at the 2025 BOSS Open, Engel became only the second-youngest player since 1990 to win a tour-level match (excluding Davis Cup) on three surfaces: hardcourt, clay court and grass after Rafael Nadal who accomplished the feat at a younger age (at 17 years and two months). It was his first professional win on grass courts. He reached his first quarterfinal on the ATP Tour by defeating seventh seed Alex Michelsen in the second round, his first win over a top 50 player. He became the youngest quarterfinalist in the history of the tournament and the youngest at a grass tournament since Boris Becker at Wimbledon in 1985. He lost to fourth seed Félix Auger-Aliassime in the quarterfinals.

In September, Engel became the second youngest player in the Germany Davis Cup team after Boris Becker when he beat Japanese Rei Sakamoto in his debut match. He reached his first semifinal at a Challenger 125 at the Orléans Open, losing to top seed Raphaël Collignon in the semifinal. As a result Engel entered the top 200 at world No. 191 on 29 September 2025, putting him at 10th position in the NextGen race to Jeddah.

In October, at 18 years and 25 days, Engel won his maiden Challenger title at the 2025 Hamburg Ladies & Gents Cup, defeating 18 year-old Federico Cinà, in the youngest Challenger final since Ancic-Nadal in 2003. Engel overtook Fonseca as the youngest Challenger winner of 2025, and was the fifth-youngest German champion in Challenger history. As a result he reached a new career-high ranking of No. 188 on 27 October 2025, and also moved into ninth position in the NextGen ATP race.

== Performance timeline ==
Key
W	F	SF	QF	#R	RR	Q#	DNQ	A	NH

(W) winner; (F) finalist; (SF) semifinalist; (QF) quarterfinalist; (#R) rounds 4, 3, 2, 1; (RR) round-robin stage; (Q#) qualification round; (DNQ) did not qualify; (A) absent; (NH) not held; (SR) strike rate (events won / competed); (W–L) win–loss record.
To avoid confusion and double counting, these charts are updated at the conclusion of a tournament or when the player's participation has ended.

=== Singles ===
Current through the 2026 Hamburg Open.

Tournament	2024	2025	2026	SR	W–L
Grand Slam tournaments
Australian Open	A	A	Q1	0 / 0	0–0
French Open	A	A	A	0 / 0	0–0
Wimbledon	A	A	A	0 / 0	0–0
US Open	A	Q1	A	0 / 0	0–0
Win–loss	0–0	0–0	0–0	0 / 0	0–0
National representation
Davis Cup	A	Q2	Q1	0 / 0	2–0
Career statistics
Tournaments	1	6	2	9	
Hard win–loss	1–1	1–3	1–0	0 / 2	3–4
Clay win–loss	0–0	1–3	0–2	0 / 5	1–5
Grass win–loss	0–0	2–2	0–0	0 / 2	2–2
Overall win–loss	1–1	4–8	1–2	0 / 9	6–11
Year-end ranking	396	187		35%	

== ATP Challenger Tour finals ==
=== Singles: 1 (title) ===
Legend ATP Challenger (1–0)	Finals by surface Hard (1–0) Clay (–)

Result	W–L	Date	Tournament	Surface	Opponent	Score
Win	1–0	Oct 2025	Hamburg Ladies & Gents Cup, Germany	Hard (i)	(Italy) Federico Cinà	7–5, 7–6^{(7–4)}

== ITF World Tennis Tour finals ==
=== Singles: 5 (5 titles) ===
Legend ITF WTT (5–0)	Finals by surface Hard (–) Clay (4–0) Carpet (1–0)

Result	W–L	Date	Tournament	Surface	Opponent	Score
Win	1–0	May 2024	M15 Villach, Austria	Clay	(Switzerland) Jérôme Kym	6–3, 3–6, 6–3
Win	2–0	Jul 2024	M15 Uslar, Germany	Clay	(Argentina) Lautaro Agustín Falabella	6–2, 6–4
Win	3–0	Aug 2024	M15 Trier, Germany	Clay	(Germany) Milan Welte	6–1, 6–4
Win	4–0	Sep 2024	M15 Cap d'Agde, France	Clay	(France) Lucas Bouquet	2–6, 6–2, 6–4
Win	5–0	Jan 2025	M15 Cadolzburg, Germany	Carpet (i)	(United Kingdom) Hamish Stewart	7–6^{(7–2)}, 6–3

=== Doubles: 1 (runner-up) ===
Legend ITF WTT (0–1)

Result	W–L	Date	Tournament	Surface	Partner	Opponents	Score
Loss	0–1	Sep 2023	M15 Oberhausen, Germany	Clay	(Germany) Yannik Kelm	(Germany) Adrian Oetzbach (Germany) Jakob Schnaitter	5–7, 4–6
