= Tessa Johanna Brockmann =

German tennis player

- Country (sports): Germany
- Born: 21 November 2005 (age 21)
- Height: 1.80 m (5 ft 11 in)
- Plays: Right-handed (two-handed backhand)
- Prize money: $98,157

Singles
- Career record: 131–93
- Career titles: 4 ITF
- Highest ranking: No. 254 (4 May 2026)
- Current ranking: No. 304 (9 November 2026)

Doubles
- Career record: 42–39
- Career titles: 3 ITF
- Highest ranking: No. 287 (9 November 2026)
- Current ranking: No. 287 (9 November 2026)
- Last updated on: 9 November 2026.

Tessa Johanna Brockmann (born 21 November 2005) is a German tennis player.

Brockmann has a career-high singles ranking by the WTA of No. 254, achieved on 4 May 2026, and a best doubles ranking of No. 287, attained on 9 November 2026.

== Career ==
Brockmann made her WTA Tour main-draw debut at the 2025 Hamburg Open in doubles, partnering with Sonja Zhenikhova as wildcards.

== ITF Circuit finals ==
=== Singles: 7 (4 titles, 3 runner-ups) ===
Legend W50 tournaments (0–1) W35 tournaments (1–0) W15 tournaments (3–2)	Finals by surface Hard (0–2) Clay (4–1)

Result	W–L	Date	Tournament	Tier	Surface	Opponent	Score
Loss	0–1	Jan 2024	ITF Monastir, Tunisia	W15	Hard	(Czech Republic) Amélie Šmejkalová	2–6, 3–6
Win	1–1	May 2025	ITF Kalmar, Sweden	W15	Clay	(Estonia) Elena Malõgina	2–6, 7–6^{(10–8)}, 7–6^{(7–4)}
Win	2–1	Jun 2025	ITF Merzig, Germany	W15	Clay	(Germany) Valentina Steiner	6–4, 6–0
Loss	2–2	Aug 2025	ITF Leipzig, Germany	W50	Clay	Alisa Oktiabreva	4–6, 2–6
Win	3–2	Aug 2025	ITF Erwitte, Germany	W35	Clay	(France) Alice Tubello	6–3, 6–3
Win	4–2	Aug 2025	ITF Kaltenkirchen, Germany	W15	Clay	(Ukraine) Polina Skliar	6–3, 7–5
Loss	4–3	Oct 2025	ITF Essen, Germany	W15	Hard (i)	(Germany) Eva Bennemann	6–1, 3–6, 1–6

=== Doubles: 7 (3 titles, 4 runner-ups) ===
Legend W75 tournaments (1–2) W35 tournaments (1–0) W15 tournaments (1–2)	Finals by surface Hard (2–2) Clay (1–1) Carpet (0–1)

Result	W–L	Date	Tournament	Tier	Surface	Partner	Opponents	Score
Loss	0–1	Apr 2024	ITF Monastir, Tunisia	W15	Hard	(Belgium) Ema Kovacevic	(South Korea) Jang Ga-eul; Mariia Tkacheva	5–7, 3–6
Loss	0–2	Apr 2025	ITF Antalya, Turkiye	W15	Clay	(Germany) Phillippa Preugschat	(Turkey) Defne Çırpanlı (Romania) Vanessa Popa Teiuşanu	5–7, 2–6
Win	1–2	Jul 2025	ITF Horb, Germany	W35	Clay	(Germany) Josy Daems	(Argentina) Jazmín Ortenzi (Brazil) Rebeca Pereira	5–7, 6–2, [10–2]
Win	2–2	Oct 2025	ITF Essen, Germany	W15	Hard (i)	(Germany) Laura Böhner	(Germany) Josy Daems (Ukraine) Anastasiia Firman	7–5, 6–4
Loss	2–3	Oct 2025	Hamburg Ladies Cup, Germany	W75	Hard (i)	(Germany) Phillippa Preugschat	(Poland) Martyna Kubka (Greece) Sapfo Sakellaridi	3–6, 2–6
Loss	2–4	Feb 2026	AK Ladies Open, Germany	W75	Carpet (i)	(Germany) Nastasja Schunk	(Poland) Martyna Kubka (Lithuania) Justina Mikulskytė	1–6, 2–6
Win	3–4	Nov 2026	Kyotec Open, Luxembourg	W75	Hard (i)	(Germany) Ella Seidel	(United States) Clervie Ngounoue (United States) Malkia Ngounoue	6–4, 6–3
