= Hamburg Ladies & Gents Cup =

- 2026 Hamburg Ladies & Gents Cup

Tournament information
- Event name: Hamburg Ladies & Gents Cup
- Founded: 2019
- Location: Hamburg, Germany
- Venue: Hamburger TennisVerband
- Surface: Hard (indoor), Clay (2026–)
- Website: hamburger-tennisverband.de
ATP Tour
- Category: ATP Challenger Tour
- Draw: 32S/16Q/16D
- Prize money: €54,000 (2025), €45,730
WTA Tour
- Category: ITF Women's World Tennis Tour
- Draw: 32S/32Q/16D
- Prize money: $60,000

The Hamburg Ladies & Gents Cup is a professional tennis tournament played on indoor hardcourts. It is currently part of the ATP Challenger Tour and the ITF Women's World Tennis Tour. It is held annually in Hamburg, Germany since 2019.

== Past finals ==
=== Men's singles ===
Year	Champion	Runner-up	Score
2026	(Czech Republic) Jan Kumstát	(Germany) Marvin Möller	4–6, 7–6^{(7–5)}, 7–5
2025	(Germany) Justin Engel	(Italy) Federico Cinà	7–5, 7–6^{(7–4)}
2024	(Germany) Henri Squire	(France) Clément Chidekh	6–4, 6–2
2023	(Ukraine) Illya Marchenko	(Austria) Dennis Novak	6–2, 6–3
2022	(Switzerland) Alexander Ritschard	(Switzerland) Henri Laaksonen	7–5, 6–5 ret.
2021	not held		
2020	(Japan) Taro Daniel	(Austria) Sebastian Ofner	6–1, 6–2
2019	(Netherlands) Botic van de Zandschulp	(Spain) Bernabé Zapata Miralles	6–3, 5–7, 6–1

=== Women's singles ===
Year	Champion	Runner-up	Score
2026	(Czech Republic) Anna Sisková	(United States) Rasheeda McAdoo	7–6^{(8–6)}, 1–6, 6–3
2025	Erika Andreeva	(Spain) Kaitlin Quevedo	6–4, 6–2
2024	(Germany) Mona Barthel	(United Kingdom) Sonay Kartal	6–4, 7–6^{(8–6)}
2023	Julia Avdeeva	(Germany) Ella Seidel	6–4, 7–6^{(7–2)}
2022	(Spain) Rebeka Masarova	(Belgium) Ysaline Bonaventure	6–4, 6–3
2021 (2)	(Croatia) Antonia Ružić	(Hungary) Tímea Babos	6–2, 4–1 ret.
2021 (1)	(China) Zheng Qinwen	(Czech Republic) Linda Fruhvirtová	6–2, 6–3

=== Men's doubles ===
Year	Champions	Runner-ups	Score
2026	(Croatia) Admir Kalender (Croatia) Nino Serdarušić	(Germany) Niels McDonald (Germany) Jannik Opitz	6–3, 6–4
2025	(Belgium) Michael Geerts (Germany) Tim Rühl	(Slovakia) Miloš Karol (Finland) Patrik Niklas-Salminen	7–6^{(8–6)}, 7–5
2024	(Italy) Mattia Bellucci (Switzerland) Rémy Bertola	(Poland) Karol Drzewiecki (Finland) Patrik Niklas-Salminen	6–4, 7–5
2023	(Austria) Dennis Novak (Australia) Akira Santillan	(Romania) Alexandru Jecan (Netherlands) Mick Veldheer	6–4, 3–6, [10–3]
2022	(Philippines) Treat Huey (United States) Max Schnur	(Jamaica) Dustin Brown (Germany) Julian Lenz	7–6^{(8–6)}, 6–4
2021	not held		
2020	(Switzerland) Marc-Andrea Hüsler (Poland) Kamil Majchrzak	(United Kingdom) Lloyd Glasspool (United States) Alex Lawson	6–3, 1–6, [20–18]
2019	(United States) James Cerretani (United States) Maxime Cressy	(United Kingdom) Ken Skupski (Australia) John-Patrick Smith	6–4, 6–4

=== Women's doubles ===
Year	Champions	Runner-ups	Score
2026	(Japan) Momoko Kobori (Japan) Ayano Shimizu	(Ukraine) Valeriya Strakhova; Anastasia Tikhonova	6–4, 6–2
2025	(Poland) Martyna Kubka (Greece) Sapfo Sakellaridi	(Germany) Tessa Brockmann (Germany) Phillippa Preugschat	6–3, 6–2
2024	(United Kingdom) Madeleine Brooks (Netherlands) Isabelle Haverlag	(India) Riya Bhatia (Netherlands) Lian Tran	6–3, 6–2
2023	(Germany) Tayisiya Morderger (Germany) Yana Morderger	Julia Avdeeva; Ekaterina Maklakova	6–1, 6–4
2022	(Czech Republic) Miriam Kolodziejová (Czech Republic) Jesika Malečková	(Slovenia) Veronika Erjavec (Norway) Malene Helgø	6–4, 6–2
2021 (2)	(Latvia) Kamilla Bartone (Switzerland) Ylena In-Albon	(Australia) Olivia Gadecki (Burundi) Sada Nahimana	6–4, 6–3
2021 (1)	(Hungary) Anna Bondár (Slovakia) Tereza Mihalíková	(France) Amandine Hesse (Belgium) Kimberley Zimmermann	6–4, 6–4
