= 2023 Schwaben Open – Doubles =

Doubles
- 2023 Schwaben Open

Final
- Champions: (Germany) Constantin Frantzen (Germany) Hendrik Jebens
- Runners-up: (France) Constantin Bittoun Kouzmine (Ukraine) Volodymyr Uzhylovskyi
- Score: 6–2, 6–2

Events
Singles	Doubles
← 2019 ·	Schwaben Open	· 2024 →

Andrei Vasilevski and Igor Zelenay were the defending champions but chose not to defend their title.

Constantin Frantzen and Hendrik Jebens won the title after defeating Constantin Bittoun Kouzmine and Volodymyr Uzhylovskyi 6–2, 6–2 in the final.

== Seeds ==
1. (Germany) Constantin Frantzen / (Germany) Hendrik Jebens (champions)
2. Ivan Liutarevich / (Ukraine) Vladyslav Manafov (quarterfinals)
3. (Austria) Neil Oberleitner / (Germany) Tim Sandkaulen (semifinals)
4. (India) Purav Raja / (India) Ramkumar Ramanathan (first round)

== Draw ==
Key

- Q = Qualifier
- WC = Wild card
- LL = Lucky loser
- Alt = Alternate
- ITF = ITF entry
- PR = Protected ranking
- SR = Special ranking
- SE = Special exempt
- JE = Junior exempt
- JR = Junior Accelerator Programme entrant
- CO = College Accelerator Programme entrant
- NG = Next Gen Accelerator Program entrant
- w/o = Walkover
- r = Retired
- d = Defaulted

First round
1	(Germany) C Frantzen (Germany) H Jebens	6^{5}	7^{7}	[10]
(Lebanon) H Habib (Lebanon) B Hassan	7^{7}	6^{2}	[8]
WC	(Germany) J Schnaitter (Germany) M Wallner	6	6
Alt	(Germany) N Kuhn (United States) A Martin	3	4
3	(Austria) N Oberleitner (Germany) T Sandkaulen	4	6	[10]
(Peru) A Merino (Germany) C Negritu	6	4	[7]
(Argentina) S Rodríguez Taverna (Argentina) JB Torres	7^{8}	7
(Austria) D Pichler (India) Parikshit Somani	6^{6}	5
(Spain) O Roca Batalla (Spain) N Sánchez Izquierdo	5	6	[10]
Alt	(United States) Nicholas Bybel (United States) O Crawford	7	3	[7]
(France) C Bittoun Kouzmine (Ukraine) V Uzhylovskyi	7^{7}	3	[10]
4	(India) P Raja (India) R Ramanathan	6^{5}	6	[8]
(United Kingdom) B Harris (Portugal) H Rocha	7	7
Alt	(Germany) Lucas Gerch (Germany) Timo Stodder	5	5
(Tunisia) M Echargui (Italy) Federico Iannaccone	4	3
2	I Liutarevich (Ukraine) V Manafov	6	6

Quarterfinals
1	(Germany) C Frantzen (Germany) H Jebens	6^{3}	6	[14]
WC	(Germany) J Schnaitter (Germany) M Wallner	7^{7}	3	[12]
3	(Austria) N Oberleitner (Germany) T Sandkaulen	6	6
(Argentina) S Rodríguez Taverna (Argentina) JB Torres	4	3
(Spain) O Roca Batalla (Spain) N Sánchez Izquierdo	5	4
(France) C Bittoun Kouzmine (Ukraine) V Uzhylovskyi	7	6
(United Kingdom) B Harris (Portugal) H Rocha	6	6
2	I Liutarevich (Ukraine) V Manafov	4	4

Semifinals
1	(Germany) C Frantzen (Germany) H Jebens	7^{7}	6
3	(Austria) N Oberleitner (Germany) T Sandkaulen	6^{3}	0
(France) C Bittoun Kouzmine (Ukraine) V Uzhylovskyi	6	6^{2}	[10]
(United Kingdom) B Harris (Portugal) H Rocha	3	7^{7}	[7]

Final
1	(Germany) C Frantzen (Germany) H Jebens	6	6
(France) C Bittoun Kouzmine (Ukraine) V Uzhylovskyi	2	2
