= 2025 Schwaben Open – Doubles =

Doubles
- 2025 Schwaben Open

Final
- Champions: (Germany) Daniel Masur (Germany) Benito Sanchez Martinez
- Runners-up: (Czech Republic) Jiří Barnat (Czech Republic) Filip Duda
- Score: 7–6^{(7–2)}, 6–2

Events
| Singles | Doubles |
- Schwaben Open

Jakob Schnaitter and Mark Wallner were the defending champions but chose not to defend their title.

Daniel Masur and Benito Sanchez Martinez won the title after defeating Jiří Barnat and Filip Duda 7–6^{(7–2)}, 6–2 in the final.

== Seeds ==
1. (Peru) Alexander Merino / (Germany) Christoph Negritu (first round)
2. (Czech Republic) Jiří Barnat / (Czech Republic) Filip Duda (final)
3. (Bolivia) Boris Arias / (Bolivia) Juan Carlos Prado Ángelo (semifinals)
4. (Germany) Tim Rühl / (Germany) Patrick Zahraj (semifinals)

== Draw ==
Key

- Q = Qualifier
- WC = Wild card
- LL = Lucky loser
- Alt = Alternate
- ITF = ITF entry
- PR = Protected ranking
- SR = Special ranking
- SE = Special exempt
- JE = Junior exempt
- JR = Junior Accelerator Programme entrant
- CO = College Accelerator Programme entrant
- NG = Next Gen Accelerator Program entrant
- w/o = Walkover
- r = Retired
- d = Defaulted

=== Draw ===
First round
1 | (Peru) A Merino (Germany) C Negritu | 0 | 2
(Germany) D Masur (Germany) B Sanchez Martinez | 6 | 6
(France) C Denolly (Slovakia) A Martin | 4 | 4
WC | (Germany) M Schönhaus (Germany) H Squire | 6 | 6
4 | (Germany) T Rühl (Germany) P Zahraj | 6 | 6
(Germany) Maik Steiner (Ukraine) V Uzhylovskyi | 3 | 3
(Norway) L Hellum Lilleengen (France) M Westphal | 3 | 4
(Croatia) L Mikrut (Croatia) M Poljičak | 6 | 6
(Italy) R Brancaccio (Spain) I Montes de la Torre | w/o
(Czech Republic) Matyáš Černý (Czech Republic) Matthew William Donald
(Belgium) B Gadamauri (Czech Republic) Tadeáš Paroulek | 2 | 4
3 | (Bolivia) B Arias (Bolivia) JC Prado Ángelo | 6 | 6
(Spain) N Sánchez Izquierdo (Argentina) JB Torres
(Germany) D Dedura (Spain) Imanol López Morillo | w/o
WC | (Germany) Nikolai Barsukov (Germany) Luca Wiedenmann | 2 | 2
2 | (Czech Republic) Jiří Barnat (Czech Republic) F Duda | 6 | 6

Quarterfinals
(Germany) D Masur (Germany) B Sanchez Martinez | 6 | 3 | [10]
WC | (Germany) M Schönhaus (Germany) H Squire | 3 | 6 | [7]
4 | (Germany) T Rühl (Germany) P Zahraj | 6 | 5 | [15]
(Croatia) L Mikrut (Croatia) M Poljičak | 4 | 7 | [13]
(Italy) R Brancaccio (Spain) I Montes de la Torre | 3 | 7 | [7]
3 | (Bolivia) B Arias (Bolivia) JC Prado Ángelo | 6 | 5 | [10]
(Germany) D Dedura (Spain) I López Morillo | 1 | 6 | [5]
2 | (Czech Republic) J Barnat (Czech Republic) F Duda | 6 | 4 | [10]

Semifinals
(Germany) D Masur (Germany) B Sanchez Martinez | 6 | 6
4 | (Germany) T Rühl (Germany) P Zahraj | 3 | 4
3 | (Bolivia) B Arias (Bolivia) JC Prado Ángelo | 4 | 3
2 | (Czech Republic) J Barnat (Czech Republic) F Duda | 6 | 6

Final
(Germany) D Masur (Germany) B Sanchez Martinez | 7^{7} | 6
2 | (Czech Republic) J Barnat (Czech Republic) F Duda | 6^{2} | 2
