= 2023 Schwaben Open – Singles =

Singles
- 2023 Schwaben Open

Final
- Champion: (Spain) Carlos Taberner
- Runner-up: (Spain) Oriol Roca Batalla
- Score: 6–4, 6–4

Events
Singles	Doubles
← 2019 ·	Schwaben Open	· 2024 →

Yannick Hanfmann was the defending champion but chose not to defend his title.

Carlos Taberner won the title after defeating Oriol Roca Batalla 6–4, 6–4 in the final.

== Seeds ==
1. (Argentina) Hernán Casanova (first round, retired)
2. (Lebanon) Benjamin Hassan (quarterfinals, retired)
3. (Argentina) Román Andrés Burruchaga (first round)
4. (Canada) Steven Diez (second round)
5. (France) Manuel Guinard (first round, retired)
6. (Argentina) Santiago Rodríguez Taverna (first round)
7. (Germany) Timo Stodder (semifinals)
8. (Spain) Nikolás Sánchez Izquierdo (first round)

== Draw ==
Key

- Q = Qualifier
- WC = Wild card
- LL = Lucky loser
- Alt = Alternate
- ITF = ITF entry
- PR = Protected ranking
- SR = Special ranking
- SE = Special exempt
- JE = Junior exempt
- JR = Junior Accelerator Programme entrant
- CO = College Accelerator Programme entrant
- NG = Next Gen Accelerator Program entrant
- w/o = Walkover
- r = Retired
- d = Defaulted

=== Finals ===
Semifinals
Q	(Brazil) Nicolas Zanellato	3	4
(Spain) Oriol Roca Batalla	6	6
(Spain) Carlos Taberner	6	6
7	(Germany) Timo Stodder	3	3

Final
(Spain) Oriol Roca Batalla	4	4
(Spain) Carlos Taberner	6	6

=== Top half ===
First round
1	(Argentina) H Casanova	4^{r}
(Germany) Lucas Gerch	5
LL	(Portugal) H Rocha	1	1
(Tunisia) M Echargui	6	6
(Germany) Elmar Ejupovic	6	4	2
Q	(Brazil) Nicolas Zanellato	3	6	6
WC	(Germany) M Möller	2	6	6
8	(Spain) N Sánchez Izquierdo	6	2	0
4	(Canada) S Diez	6	6^{8}	6
Q	(Austria) D Pichler	3	7^{10}	1
Q	(Germany) C Negritu	2	7^{8}	3
(Spain) O Roca Batalla	6	6^{6}	6
(Italy) Alexander Weis	2	7	4
(France) M Martineau	6	5	6
(Croatia) N Serdarušić	6	1
5	(France) M Guinard	1	0^{r}

Second round
(Germany) L Gerch	3	4
(Tunisia) M Echargui	6	6
Q	(Brazil) N Zanellato	3	7	6
WC	(Germany) M Möller	6	5	4
4	(Canada) S Diez	1	4
(Spain) O Roca Batalla	6	6
(France) M Martineau	3	6	4
(Croatia) N Serdarušić	6	4	6

Quarterfinals
(Tunisia) M Echargui	5	1
Q	(Brazil) N Zanellato	7	6
(Spain) O Roca Batalla	6	6
(Croatia) N Serdarušić	4	4

Semifinals
Q	(Brazil) N Zanellato	3	4
(Spain) O Roca Batalla	6	6

=== Bottom half ===
First round
6	(Argentina) S Rodríguez Taverna	5	6^{2}
(Germany) L Wessels	7	7^{7}
Q	(Italy) G Ferrari	6^{1}	6	6
(United Kingdom) B Harris	7^{7}	1	4
(United States) O Crawford	6	6
(Italy) G Fonio	2	3
(Spain) C Taberner	6	6
3	(Argentina) RA Burruchaga	1	4
7	(Germany) Timo Stodder	7	6
(Netherlands) M Houkes	5	1
Q	(Lebanon) H Habib	6^{4}	6	6^{2}
(United States) A Martin	7^{7}	3	7^{7}
(Belgium) G-A Bailly	6	6
WC	(Germany) M Topo	1	2
Q	(Germany) D Masur	2	6^{4}
2	(Lebanon) B Hassan	6	7^{7}

Second round
(Germany) L Wessels	2	4
Q	(Italy) G Ferrari	6	6
(United States) O Crawford	6	4	6^{3}
(Spain) C Taberner	3	6	7^{7}
7	(Germany) T Stodder	6	6
(United States) A Martin	1	1
(Belgium) G-A Bailly	4	4
2	(Lebanon) B Hassan	6	6

Quarterfinals
Q	(Italy) G Ferrari	4	1
(Spain) C Taberner	6	6
7	(Germany) T Stodder	4	7^{7}	5
2	(Lebanon) B Hassan	6	6^{4}	3^{r}

Semifinals
(Spain) C Taberner	6	6
7	(Germany) T Stodder	3	3
