= 2025 Schwaben Open – Singles =

Singles
- 2025 Schwaben Open

Final
- Champion: (Germany) Cedrik-Marcel Stebe
- Runner-up: (Switzerland) Alexander Ritschard
- Score: 6–3, 6–3

Events
Singles	Doubles
- Schwaben Open

Timofey Skatov was the defending champion but chose not to defend his title.

Cedrik-Marcel Stebe won the title after defeating Alexander Ritschard 6–3, 6–3 in the final.

== Seeds ==
1. (Bolivia) Juan Carlos Prado Ángelo (first round)
2. (Germany) Christoph Negritu (quarterfinals)
3. (Germany) Patrick Zahraj (first round)
4. (Croatia) Mili Poljičak (first round)
5. (Czech Republic) Hynek Bartoň (second round)
6. (Spain) Nikolás Sánchez Izquierdo (quarterfinals)
7. (France) Corentin Denolly (first round)
8. (Switzerland) Alexander Ritschard (final)

== Draw ==
Key

- Q = Qualifier
- WC = Wild card
- LL = Lucky loser
- Alt = Alternate
- ITF = ITF entry
- PR = Protected ranking
- SR = Special ranking
- SE = Special exempt
- JE = Junior exempt
- JR = Junior Accelerator Programme entrant
- CO = College Accelerator Programme entrant
- NG = Next Gen Accelerator Program entrant
- w/o = Walkover
- r = Retired
- d = Defaulted

=== Finals ===
Semifinals
(Czech Republic) Zdeněk Kolář	2	3
PR	(Germany) Cedrik-Marcel Stebe	6	6
(Germany) Henri Squire	3	6	2
8	(Switzerland) Alexander Ritschard	6	4	6

Final
PR	(Germany) Cedrik-Marcel Stebe	6	6
8	(Switzerland) Alexander Ritschard	3	3

=== Top half ===
First round
1	(Bolivia) JC Prado Ángelo	3	6	4
(Belgium) G-A Bailly	6	4	6
WC	(Germany) D Masur	3	5
Q	(Germany) B Sanchez Martinez	6	7
(Czech Republic) Z Kolář	6	6
(Croatia) L Mikrut	2	3
WC	(Germany) Mika Petkovic	2	4
5	(Czech Republic) H Bartoň	6	6
4	(Croatia) M Poljičak	1	6	0
PR	(Germany) C-M Stebe	6	0	6
(Italy) J Berrettini	7^{7}	6^{6}	6^{2}
Q	(Belgium) B Gadamauri	6^{3}	7^{8}	7^{7}
(Latvia) R Strombachs	6	6^{6}	5
Q	(Czech Republic) Matyáš Černý	3	7^{8}	7
Q	(Czech Republic) Tadeáš Paroulek	6	7^{7}
7	(France) C Denolly	2	6^{2}

Second round
(Belgium) G-A Bailly	3	6^{6}
Q	(Germany) B Sanchez Martinez	6	7^{8}
(Czech Republic) Z Kolář	6	6
5	(Czech Republic) H Bartoň	4	4
PR	(Germany) C-M Stebe	6	4	7^{8}
Q	(Belgium) B Gadamauri	2	6	6^{6}
Q	(Czech Republic) M Černý	6^{5}	7^{7}	6
Q	(Czech Republic) T Paroulek	7^{7}	6^{4}	2

Quarterfinals
Q	(Germany) B Sanchez Martinez	1	1
(Czech Republic) Z Kolář	6	6
PR	(Germany) C-M Stebe	6	3
Q	(Czech Republic) M Černý	0	1^{r}

Semifinals
(Czech Republic) Z Kolář	2	3
PR	(Germany) C-M Stebe	6	6

=== Bottom half ===
First round
6	(Spain) N Sánchez Izquierdo	7^{7}	3	6
(Italy) R Brancaccio	6^{4}	6	3
(Slovakia) A Martin	2	0
(Germany) D Dedura	6	6
(Argentina) JB Torres	5	6^{4}
(Germany) H Squire	7	7^{7}
(Spain) I Montes de la Torre	6	6
3	(Germany) P Zahraj	4	4
8	(Switzerland) A Ritschard	6	6
(Germany) R Molleker	1	2
WC	(Germany) M Schönhaus	1	7^{7}	3
Alt	(Czech Republic) Jakub Nicod	6	6^{4}	2^{r}
Q	(Germany) Nino Ehrenschneider	3	6^{7}
Q	(Serbia) Stefan Popović	6	7^{9}
(Germany) M Marterer	3	6	2
2	(Germany) C Negritu	6	4	6

Second round
6	(Spain) N Sánchez Izquierdo	6	7^{8}
(Germany) D Dedura	2	6^{6}
(Germany) H Squire	2	6	6
(Spain) I Montes de la Torre	6	2	4
8	(Switzerland) A Ritschard	7^{7}	0	7^{7}
WC	(Germany) M Schönhaus	6^{4}	6	6^{3}
Q	(Serbia) S Popović	7^{8}	5	4
2	(Germany) C Negritu	6^{6}	7	6

Quarterfinals
6	(Spain) N Sánchez Izquierdo	3	3
(Germany) H Squire	6	6
8	(Switzerland) A Ritschard	6	4	6
2	(Germany) C Negritu	4	6	4

Semifinals
(Germany) H Squire	3	6	2
8	(Switzerland) A Ritschard	6	4	6
