= 2024 Schwaben Open =

- Date: 20–25 May
- Edition: 3rd
- Location: Augsburg, Germany

Champions

Singles
- (Kazakhstan) Timofey Skatov

Doubles
- (Germany) Jakob Schnaitter / (Germany) Mark Wallner
- Schwaben Open

The 2024 Schwaben Open was a professional tennis tournament played on clay courts. It was the third edition of the tournament which was part of the 2024 ATP Challenger Tour. It took place in Augsburg, Germany between 20 and 25 May 2024.

== Singles main-draw entrants ==
=== Seeds ===
Country	Player	Rank^{1}	Seed
KAZ	Timofey Skatov	247	1
ARG	Andrea Collarini	279	2
LTU	Vilius Gaubas	285	3
CZE	Michael Vrbenský	296	4
PAR	Daniel Vallejo	299	5
DEN	August Holmgren	307	6
~~GER~~	~~Marvin Möller~~	~~308~~	~~7~~
DEN	Elmer Møller	310	8

- ^{1} Rankings are as of 6 May 2024.

=== Other entrants ===
The following players received wildcards into the singles main draw:

- (Germany) Liam Gavrielides
- (Germany) Tom Gentzsch
- (Germany) Oscar Otte

The following player received entry into the singles main draw using a protected ranking:

- (France) Evan Furness

The following players received entry into the singles main draw as alternates:

- (Germany) Lucas Gerch
- (United States) Toby Kodat

The following players received entry from the qualifying draw:

- (Germany) Diego Dedura-Palomero
- (Brazil) Daniel Dutra da Silva
- (Italy) Luca Giacomini
- (Slovakia) Norbert Gombos
- (Italy) Andrea Picchione
- (Italy) Luca Potenza

The following player received entry as a lucky loser:

- (Brazil) Mateus Alves

== Champions ==
=== Singles ===
- (Kazakhstan) Timofey Skatov def. (Denmark) Elmer Møller 3–6, 7–5, 6–3.

=== Doubles ===
- (Germany) Jakob Schnaitter / (Germany) Mark Wallner def. (Austria) David Pichler / (Czech Republic) Michael Vrbenský 3–6, 6–2, [10–8].
