= 2025 Heilbronner Neckarcup – Doubles =

Doubles
- 2025 Heilbronner Neckarcup

Final
- Champions: (United States) Vasil Kirkov (Netherlands) Bart Stevens
- Runners-up: (Germany) Jakob Schnaitter (Germany) Mark Wallner
- Score: 7–6^{(7–5)}, 4–6, [10–7]

Events
| Singles | Doubles |
- Heilbronner Neckarcup

Romain Arneodo and Geoffrey Blancaneaux were the defending champions but chose not to defend their title.

Vasil Kirkov and Bart Stevens won the title after defeating Jakob Schnaitter and Mark Wallner 7–6^{(7–5)}, 4–6, [10–7] in the final.

== Seeds ==
1. (Germany) Jakob Schnaitter / (Germany) Mark Wallner (final)
2. (Netherlands) Matwé Middelkoop / (Netherlands) Jean-Julien Rojer (first round)
3. (United States) Vasil Kirkov / (Netherlands) Bart Stevens (champions)
4. (Netherlands) Robin Haase / (Brazil) Marcelo Zormann (quarterfinals)

== Draw ==
Key

- Q = Qualifier
- WC = Wild card
- LL = Lucky loser
- Alt = Alternate
- ITF = ITF entry
- PR = Protected ranking
- SR = Special ranking
- SE = Special exempt
- JE = Junior exempt
- JR = Junior Accelerator Programme entrant
- CO = College Accelerator Programme entrant
- NG = Next Gen Accelerator Program entrant
- w/o = Walkover
- r = Retired
- d = Defaulted

=== Draw ===
First round
1 | (Germany) J Schnaitter (Germany) M Wallner | 6 | 7^{7}
(Romania) A Jecan (Romania) B Pavel | 4 | 6^{4}
(Netherlands) M Hermans (Italy) G Ricca | 6 | 7^{7}
(Czech Republic) Jiří Barnat (Czech Republic) F Duda | 2 | 6^{4}
4 | (Netherlands) R Haase (Brazil) M Zormann | 6 | 6
I Liutarevich (Greece) Pe Tsitsipas | 1 | 4
(Italy) M Bortolotti (Colombia) C Rodríguez | 6 | 6
(Venezuela) LD Martínez (Argentina) F Mena | 3 | 4
(India) S Nagal (Argentina) M Trungelliti | 5 | 4
WC | (Germany) T Handel (Germany) Lasse Pörtner | 7 | 6
WC | (Germany) M Rosenkranz (Germany) T Rühl | 3 | 3
3 | (United States) V Kirkov (Netherlands) B Stevens | 6 | 6
(Italy) F Passaro; M Sharipov | 6 | 6
(Italy) A Pellegrino (Spain) D Rincón | 4 | 1
(France) J Eysseric (Poland) S Walków | 3 | 6 | [12]
2 | (Netherlands) M Middelkoop (Netherlands) J-J Rojer | 6 | 3 | [10]

Quarterfinals
1 | (Germany) J Schnaitter (Germany) M Wallner | 7^{7} | 6
(Netherlands) M Hermans (Italy) G Ricca | 6^{2} | 4
4 | (Netherlands) R Haase (Brazil) M Zormann | 3 | 4
(Italy) M Bortolotti (Colombia) C Rodríguez | 6 | 6
WC | (Germany) T Handel (Germany) L Pörtner | 2 | 4
3 | (United States) V Kirkov (Netherlands) B Stevens | 6 | 6
(Italy) F Passaro; M Sharipov | 6 | 6
(France) J Eysseric (Poland) S Walków | 3 | 4

Semifinals
1 | (Germany) J Schnaitter (Germany) M Wallner | 7^{7} | 6
(Italy) M Bortolotti (Colombia) C Rodríguez | 6^{4} | 1
3 | (United States) V Kirkov (Netherlands) B Stevens | 6 | 6
(Italy) F Passaro; M Sharipov | 2 | 4

Final
1 | (Germany) J Schnaitter (Germany) M Wallner | 6^{5} | 6 | [7]
3 | (United States) V Kirkov (Netherlands) B Stevens | 7^{7} | 4 | [10]
