= 2026 Cincinnati Open – Men's doubles =

Men's doubles
- 2026 Cincinnati Open

Final
- Champions: (Brazil) Orlando Luz (Brazil) Rafael Matos
- Runners-up: (Germany) Constantin Frantzen (Netherlands) Robin Haase
- Score: 6–4, 3–6, [10–7]

Details
- Draw: 32 (3 WC )
- Seeds: 8

Events
Singles	men	women
Doubles	men	women
- Cincinnati Open

Orlando Luz and Rafael Matos defeated Constantin Frantzen and Robin Haase in the final, 6–4, 3–6, [10–7] to win the men's doubles tennis title at the 2026 Cincinnati Open. It was their second consecutive ATP Masters 1000 title, having previously won Montreal, thus becoming the first pair in men's doubles to win both the Canadian and Cincinnati Open titles in the same year since Pierre-Hugues Herbert and Nicolas Mahut in 2017, and the fifth pair overall to do so in the Open Era.

Nikola Mektić and Rajeev Ram were the defending champions, but did not compete together this year. Mektić partnered Austin Krajicek, but lost in the second round to Marcel Granollers and Horacio Zeballos. Ram partnered Joe Salisbury, but lost in the second round to Frantzen and Haase.

== Seeds ==
1. (Finland) Harri Heliövaara / (United Kingdom) Henry Patten (second round)
2. (Spain) Marcel Granollers / (Argentina) Horacio Zeballos (semifinals)
3. (El Salvador) Marcelo Arévalo / (Croatia) Mate Pavić (second round)
4. (Italy) Simone Bolelli / (Italy) Andrea Vavassori (quarterfinals)
5. (United States) Christian Harrison / (United Kingdom) Neal Skupski (first round)
6. (Germany) Kevin Krawietz / (Germany) Tim Pütz (first round)
7. (United Kingdom) Julian Cash / (United Kingdom) Lloyd Glasspool (first round)
8. (Argentina) Guido Andreozzi / (France) Manuel Guinard (first round)

== Draw ==
Key

- Q = Qualifier
- WC = Wild card
- LL = Lucky loser
- Alt = Alternate
- ITF = ITF entry
- PR = Protected ranking
- SR = Special ranking
- SE = Special exempt
- JE = Junior exempt
- JR = Junior Accelerator Programme entrant
- CO = College Accelerator Programme entrant
- NG = Next Gen Accelerator Program entrant
- w/o = Walkover
- r = Retired
- d = Defaulted

=== Finals ===
Semifinals
(Monaco) Hugo Nys (France) Édouard Roger-Vasselin	4	6	[2]
(Brazil) Orlando Luz (Brazil) Rafael Matos	6	2	[10]
Alt	(Germany) Constantin Frantzen (Netherlands) Robin Haase	6	3	[10]
2	(Spain) Marcel Granollers (Argentina) Horacio Zeballos	3	6	[5]

Final
(Brazil) Orlando Luz (Brazil) Rafael Matos	6	3	[10]
Alt	(Germany) Constantin Frantzen (Netherlands) Robin Haase	4	6	[7]

=== Top half ===
First round
1	(Finland) H Heliövaara (United Kingdom) H Patten	6	6
Alt	(Germany) Y Hanfmann (Serbia) M Kecmanović	4	2
Alt	(United Kingdom) L Johnson (Poland) J Zieliński	6	4	[3]
(Monaco) H Nys (France) É Roger-Vasselin	3	6	[10]
(Peru) I Buse (Italy) F Cobolli	7^{8}	2	[10]
(France) S Doumbia (France) F Reboul	6^{6}	6	[12]
(Germany) J Schnaitter (Germany) M Wallner	7^{7}	4	[10]
6	(Germany) K Krawietz (Germany) T Pütz	6^{4}	6	[8]
4	(Italy) S Bolelli (Italy) A Vavassori	7^{12}	3	[10]
(France) A Rinderknech (Monaco) V Vacherot	6^{10}	6	[5]
PR	(India) Y Bhambri (New Zealand) M Venus	4	4
Alt	(Czech Republic) A Pavlásek (Czech Republic) P Rikl	6	6
(Brazil) M Melo (Germany) A Zverev	7^{7}	6
Alt	(Argentina) M Navone (Chile) A Tabilo	6^{4}	3
(Brazil) O Luz (Brazil) R Matos	6	3	[10]
5	(United States) C Harrison (United Kingdom) N Skupski	2	6	[7]

Second round
1	(Finland) H Heliövaara (United Kingdom) H Patten	4	4
(Monaco) H Nys (France) É Roger-Vasselin	6	6
(France) S Doumbia (France) F Reboul	6	6
(Germany) J Schnaitter (Germany) M Wallner	4	4
4	(Italy) S Bolelli (Italy) A Vavassori	6	6
Alt	(Czech Republic) A Pavlásek (Czech Republic) P Rikl	3	4
(Brazil) M Melo (Germany) A Zverev	6^{4}	3
(Brazil) O Luz (Brazil) R Matos	7^{7}	6

Quarterfinals
(Monaco) H Nys (France) É Roger-Vasselin	4	7^{7}	[11]
(France) S Doumbia (France) F Reboul	6	6^{5}	[9]
4	(Italy) S Bolelli (Italy) A Vavassori	6^{7}	3
(Brazil) O Luz (Brazil) R Matos	7^{9}	6

Semifinals
(Monaco) H Nys (France) É Roger-Vasselin	4	6	[2]
(Brazil) O Luz (Brazil) R Matos	6	2	[10]

=== Bottom half ===
First round
7	(United Kingdom) J Cash (United Kingdom) L Glasspool	7^{7}	4	[10]
(United States) R Ram (United Kingdom) J Salisbury	6^{1}	6	[12]
(Austria) L Miedler (Australia) M Polmans	4	6^{3}
Alt	(Germany) C Frantzen (Netherlands) R Haase	6	7^{7}
(France) T Arribagé (France) A Olivetti	7	6^{2}	[10]
(United Kingdom) A Fery (Czech Republic) J Lehečka	5	7^{7}	[6]
K Khachanov; A Rublev	6	6^{2}	[3]
3	(El Salvador) M Arévalo (Croatia) M Pavić	2	7^{7}	[10]
8	(Argentina) G Andreozzi (France) M Guinard	7^{7}	6^{8}	[7]
WC	(United States) R Galloway (United States) E King	6^{4}	7^{10}	[10]
(Italy) M Arnaldi (Italy) L Musetti	5	6^{4}
(Italy) L Darderi (Argentina) TM Etcheverry	7	7^{7}
(United States) A Krajicek (Croatia) N Mektić	7	6
WC	(United States) R Cash (United States) B Nakashima	5	4
(Portugal) F Cabral (United States) JJ Tracy	6^{4}	2
2	(Spain) M Granollers (Argentina) H Zeballos	7^{7}	6

Second round
(United States) R Ram (United Kingdom) J Salisbury	6^{5}	6	[4]
Alt	(Germany) C Frantzen (Netherlands) R Haase	7^{7}	3	[10]
(France) T Arribagé (France) A Olivetti	4	6	[10]
3	(El Salvador) M Arévalo (Croatia) M Pavić	6	3	[5]
WC	(United States) R Galloway (United States) E King	4	7	[7]
(Italy) L Darderi (Argentina) TM Etcheverry	6	5	[10]
(United States) A Krajicek (Croatia) N Mektić	3	7	[4]
2	(Spain) M Granollers (Argentina) H Zeballos	6	5	[10]

Quarterfinals
Alt	(Germany) C Frantzen (Netherlands) R Haase	7^{7}	7^{7}
(France) T Arribagé (France) A Olivetti	6^{1}	6^{3}
(Italy) L Darderi (Argentina) TM Etcheverry	3	6^{8}
2	(Spain) M Granollers (Argentina) H Zeballos	6	7^{10}

Semifinals
Alt	(Germany) C Frantzen (Netherlands) R Haase	6	3	[10]
2	(Spain) M Granollers (Argentina) H Zeballos	3	6	[5]

== Seeded teams ==
The following are the seeded teams. Seedings are based on ATP rankings as of August 3, 2026.

Country	Player	Country	Player	Rank	Seed
FIN	Harri Heliövaara	GBR	Henry Patten	2	1
ESP	Marcel Granollers	ARG	Horacio Zeballos	7	2
ESA	Marcelo Arévalo	CRO	Mate Pavić	15	3
ITA	Simone Bolelli	ITA	Andrea Vavassori	15	4
USA	Christian Harrison	GBR	Neal Skupski	17	5
GER	Kevin Krawietz	GER	Tim Pütz	21	6
GBR	Julian Cash	GBR	Lloyd Glasspool	26	7
ARG	Guido Andreozzi	FRA	Manuel Guinard	31	8

== Other entry information ==
=== Wildcards ===
- ~~(United States) Jenson Brooksby / (United States) Zachary Svajda~~
- (United States) Robert Cash / (United States) Brandon Nakashima
- (United States) Robert Galloway / (United States) Evan King

=== Protected ranking ===
- (India) Yuki Bhambri / (New Zealand) Michael Venus

=== Alternates ===
- (Germany) Constantin Frantzen / (Netherlands) Robin Haase
- (Germany) Yannick Hanfmann / (Serbia) Miomir Kecmanović
- (United Kingdom) Luke Johnson / (Poland) Jan Zieliński
- (Argentina) Mariano Navone / (Chile) Alejandro Tabilo
- (Czech Republic) Adam Pavlásek / (Czech Republic) Patrik Rikl

=== Withdrawals ===
- (Portugal) Nuno Borges / (Argentina) Francisco Cerúndolo → replaced by (Argentina) Mariano Navone / (Chile) Alejandro Tabilo
- (United States) Jenson Brooksby / (United States) Zachary Svajda → replaced by (Czech Republic) Adam Pavlásek / (Czech Republic) Patrik Rikl
- (Sweden) André Göransson / (Norway) Casper Ruud → replaced by (Germany) Yannick Hanfmann / (Serbia) Miomir Kecmanović
- Daniil Medvedev / (United States) Learner Tien → replaced by (Germany) Constantin Frantzen / (Netherlands) Robin Haase
- (United States) Tommy Paul / (United States) Ben Shelton → replaced by (United Kingdom) Luke Johnson / (Poland) Jan Zieliński
