= 2019 Schwaben Open =

- Date: 5–11 August
- Edition: 1st
- Location: Augsburg, Germany

Champions

Singles
- (Germany) Yannick Hanfmann

Doubles
- (Belarus) Andrei Vasilevski / (Slovakia) Igor Zelenay
Schwaben Open	· 2023 →

The 2019 Schwaben Open was a professional tennis tournament played on clay courts. It was the 1st edition of the tournament which was part of the 2019 ATP Challenger Tour. It took place in Augsburg, Germany between 5 and 11 August 2019.

== Singles main-draw entrants ==
=== Seeds ===
Country	Player	Rank^{1}	Seed
SUI	Henri Laaksonen	113	1
GER	Matthias Bachinger	125	2
ITA	Filippo Baldi	144	3
~~GER~~	~~Rudolf Molleker~~	~~146~~	~~4~~
CZE	Lukáš Rosol	149	5
ESP	Pedro Martínez	150	6
ESP	Guillermo García López	158	7
GER	Mats Moraing	161	8
AUT	Sebastian Ofner	167	9
~~ITA~~	~~Roberto Marcora~~	~~183~~	~~10~~
GBR	Jay Clarke	184	11
FRA	Constant Lestienne	189	12
ESP	Mario Vilella Martínez	208	13
ESP	Bernabé Zapata Miralles	224	14
GER	Yannick Hanfmann	231	15
AUT	Lucas Miedler	258	16

- ^{1} Rankings are as of July 29, 2019.

=== Other entrants ===
The following players received wildcards into the singles main draw:

- (Germany) Daniel Altmaier
- (Germany) Jeremy Jahn
- (Germany) Kai Lemstra
- (Germany) Robert Strombachs
- (Germany) Louis Wessels

The following player received entry into the singles main draw using a protected ranking:

- (Georgia (country)) Aleksandre Metreveli

The following players received entry into the singles main draw using their ITF World Tennis Ranking:

- (Spain) Javier Barranco Cosano
- (Spain) Eduard Esteve Lobato
- (Germany) Peter Heller
- (France) Arthur Rinderknech
- (Belgium) Jeroen Vanneste

The following players received entry from the qualifying draw:

- (India) Sriram Balaji
- (France) Geoffrey Blancaneaux

The following players received entry as lucky losers:

- (Germany) Niklas Guttau
- (India) Vijay Sundar Prashanth

== Champions ==
=== Singles ===
- (Germany) Yannick Hanfmann def. (Finland) Emil Ruusuvuori 2–6, 6–4, 7–5.

=== Doubles ===
- (Belarus) Andrei Vasilevski / (Slovakia) Igor Zelenay def. (Croatia) Ivan Sabanov / (Croatia) Matej Sabanov 4–6, 6–4, [10–3].
