= 2019 Schwaben Open – Singles =

Singles
- 2019 Schwaben Open

Final
- Champion: (Germany) Yannick Hanfmann
- Runner-up: (Finland) Emil Ruusuvuori
- Score: 2–6, 6–4, 7–5

Events
Singles	Doubles
Schwaben Open	· 2023 →

This was the first edition of the tournament.

Yannick Hanfmann won the title after defeating Emil Ruusuvuori 2–6, 6–4, 7–5 in the final.

== Seeds ==
All seeds receive a bye into the second round.

1. (Switzerland) Henri Laaksonen (third round)
2. (Germany) Matthias Bachinger (third round)
3. (Italy) Filippo Baldi (third round)
4. (Germany) Rudolf Molleker (withdrew)
5. (Czech Republic) Lukáš Rosol (second round)
6. (Spain) Pedro Martínez (quarterfinals)
7. (Spain) Guillermo García López (quarterfinals)
8. (Germany) Mats Moraing (second round, retired)
9. (Austria) Sebastian Ofner (third round)
10. (Italy) Roberto Marcora (withdrew)
11. (United Kingdom) Jay Clarke (second round)
12. (France) Constant Lestienne (second round)
13. (Spain) Mario Vilella Martínez (third round)
14. (Spain) Bernabé Zapata Miralles (second round)
15. (Germany) Yannick Hanfmann (champion)
16. (Austria) Lucas Miedler (second round)

== Draw ==
Key

- Q = Qualifier
- WC = Wild card
- LL = Lucky loser
- Alt = Alternate
- ITF = ITF entry
- PR = Protected ranking
- SR = Special ranking
- SE = Special exempt
- JE = Junior exempt
- JR = Junior Accelerator Programme entrant
- CO = College Accelerator Programme entrant
- NG = Next Gen Accelerator Program entrant
- w/o = Walkover
- r = Retired
- d = Defaulted

=== Finals ===
Quarterfinals
(Finland) Emil Ruusuvuori	6	7^{7}
6	(Spain) Pedro Martínez	3	6^{5}
(Germany) Julian Lenz	7^{7}	3	7
7	(Spain) Guillermo García López	6^{4}	6	5
(Argentina) Facundo Mena	6	7^{7}
WC	(Germany) Daniel Altmaier	4	6^{2}
ITF	(Belgium) Jeroen Vanneste	2	1
15	(Germany) Yannick Hanfmann	6	6

Semifinals
(Finland) Emil Ruusuvuori	6	7
(Germany) Julian Lenz	3	5
(Argentina) Facundo Mena	1	1
15	(Germany) Yannick Hanfmann	6	6

Final
(Finland) Emil Ruusuvuori	6	4	5
15	(Germany) Yannick Hanfmann	2	6	7

=== Top half ===
==== Section 1 ====
First round
(Germany) J Härteis	6^{6}	5
WC	(Germany) L Wessels	7^{8}	7
(Finland) E Ruusuvuori	6	6
(Brazil) P Sakamoto	2	1
PR	(Georgia (country)) A Metreveli	1	2
(Estonia) J Zopp	6	6
ITF	(Spain) J Barranco Cosano	2	3
WC	(Germany) Jeremy Jahn	6	6

Second round
1	(Switzerland) H Laaksonen	6	6
WC	(Germany) L Wessels	2	4
(Finland) E Ruusuvuori	6	4	6
14	(Spain) B Zapata Miralles	3	6	3
9	(Austria) S Ofner	6	6
(Estonia) J Zopp	4	2
WC	(Germany) J Jahn	5	6	6^{4}
6	(Spain) P Martínez	7	4	7^{7}

Third round
1	(Switzerland) H Laaksonen	3	4
(Finland) E Ruusuvuori	6	6
9	(Austria) S Ofner	4	1
6	(Spain) P Martínez	6	6

Quarterfinals
(Finland) E Ruusuvuori	6	7^{7}
6	(Spain) P Martínez	3	6^{5}

==== Section 2 ====
First round
(Germany) J Lenz	4	6	6
ITF	(Spain) Eduard Esteve Lobato	6	4	4
(Spain) O Roca Batalla	5	7^{7}	4
ITF	(Germany) Peter Heller	7	6^{4}	6
ITF	(France) A Rinderknech	2	4
(Spain) C Taberner	6	6
(United Kingdom) J Choinski	4	4
(Argentina) R Olivo	6	6

Second round
LL	(India) VS Prashanth	5	1
(Germany) J Lenz	7	6
ITF	(Germany) P Heller	2	2
13	(Spain) M Vilella Martínez	6	6
12	(France) C Lestienne	2	1
(Spain) C Taberner	6	6
(Argentina) R Olivo	6^{2}	4
7	(Spain) G García López	7^{7}	6

Third round
(Germany) J Lenz	6	6
13	(Spain) M Vilella Martínez	1	2
(Spain) C Taberner	3	7	2
7	(Spain) G García López	6	5	6

Quarterfinals
(Germany) J Lenz	7^{7}	3	7
7	(Spain) G García López	6^{4}	6	5

=== Bottom half ===
==== Section 3 ====
First round
(France) TK Wang	2	4
(Germany) B Hassan	6	6
(Argentina) F Mena	6	6
WC	(Germany) Kai Lemstra	4	2
(India) S Mukund	6	1	6^{6}
WC	(Germany) D Altmaier	4	6	7^{8}
Q	(France) G Blancaneaux	6	6
(Czech Republic) A Pavlásek	1	4

Second round
5	(Czech Republic) L Rosol	4	4
(Germany) B Hassan	6	6
(Argentina) F Mena	6	7
LL	(Germany) Niklas Guttau	4	5
16	(Austria) L Miedler	3	3
WC	(Germany) D Altmaier	6	6
Q	(France) G Blancaneaux	6^{5}	4
3	(Italy) F Baldi	7^{7}	6

Third round
(Germany) B Hassan	6	1	0
(Argentina) F Mena	4	6	6
WC	(Germany) D Altmaier	7^{7}	6
3	(Italy) F Baldi	6^{3}	3

Quarterfinals
(Argentina) F Mena	6	7^{7}
WC	(Germany) D Altmaier	4	6^{2}

==== Section 4 ====
First round
(France) M Guinard	6	6
(Italy) R Brancaccio	3	4
(Belarus) U Ignatik	4	5
ITF	(Belgium) Jeroen Vanneste	6	7
(Slovakia) A Molčan	6	6^{4}	6
(Romania) D Dima	2	7^{7}	4
Q	(India) S Balaji	6	6
WC	(Germany) R Strombachs	1	1

Second round
8	(Germany) M Moraing	4	7	2^{r}
(France) M Guinard	6	5	1
ITF	(Belgium) J Vanneste	6	6
11	(United Kingdom) J Clarke	3	2
15	(Germany) Y Hanfmann	4	6	6
(Slovakia) A Molčan	6	2	1
Q	(India) S Balaji	4	1
2	(Germany) M Bachinger	6	6

Third round
(France) M Guinard	1	6	4
ITF	(Belgium) J Vanneste	6	0	6
15	(Germany) Y Hanfmann	6^{5}	6	6
2	(Germany) M Bachinger	7^{7}	2	1

Quarterfinals
ITF	(Belgium) J Vanneste	2	1
15	(Germany) Y Hanfmann	6	6
