= 2019 Schwaben Open – Doubles =

Doubles
- 2019 Schwaben Open

Final
- Champions: (Belarus) Andrei Vasilevski (Slovakia) Igor Zelenay
- Runners-up: (Croatia) Ivan Sabanov (Croatia) Matej Sabanov
- Score: 4–6, 6–4, [10–3]

Events
Singles	Doubles
Schwaben Open	· 2023 →

This was the first edition of the tournament.

Andrei Vasilevski and Igor Zelenay won the title after defeating Ivan and Matej Sabanov 4–6, 6–4, [10–3] in the final.

== Seeds ==
1. (Belarus) Andrei Vasilevski / (Slovakia) Igor Zelenay (champions)
2. (India) Sriram Balaji / (India) Vishnu Vardhan (semifinals)
3. (Poland) Karol Drzewiecki / (Poland) Szymon Walków (first round)
4. (Spain) Guillermo García López / (Spain) David Marrero (semifinals, withdrew)

== Draw ==
Key

- Q = Qualifier
- WC = Wild card
- LL = Lucky loser
- Alt = Alternate
- ITF = ITF entry
- PR = Protected ranking
- SR = Special ranking
- SE = Special exempt
- JE = Junior exempt
- JR = Junior Accelerator Programme entrant
- CO = College Accelerator Programme entrant
- NG = Next Gen Accelerator Program entrant
- w/o = Walkover
- r = Retired
- d = Defaulted

First round
1	(Belarus) A Vasilevski (Slovakia) I Zelenay	6	6
ITF	(Italy) R Brancaccio (Spain) Eduard Esteve Lobato	1	4
WC	(Germany) D Altmaier (Germany) J Härteis	4	6	[10]
(Romania) D Dima (Argentina) R Olivo	6	1	[4]
4	(Spain) G García López (Spain) D Marrero	6^{5}	6	[10]
ITF	(Argentina) F Mena (Peru) A Merino	7^{7}	4	[8]
WC	(Germany) Kai Lemstra (Germany) R Strombachs	6	6^{5}	[10]
WC	(Germany) C Frantzen (Germany) Luca Wiedenmann	4	7^{7}	[7]
(Croatia) I Sabanov (Croatia) M Sabanov	6	6
3	(Poland) K Drzewiecki (Poland) S Walków	3	3
(Croatia) T Draganja (Netherlands) M Vervoort	4	7^{10}	[7]
(India) VS Prashanth (Australia) S Puodziunas	6	6^{8}	[10]
PR	(Georgia (country)) A Metreveli (Spain) M Vilella Martínez
2	(India) S Balaji (India) V Vardhan	w/o

Quarterfinals
1	(Belarus) A Vasilevski (Slovakia) I Zelenay	6	3	[10]
WC	(Germany) D Altmaier (Germany) J Härteis	2	6	[5]
4	(Spain) G García López (Spain) D Marrero	6	6
(Germany) A Begemann (Romania) F Mergea	2	2
WC	(Germany) K Lemstra (Germany) R Strombachs	1	6	[7]
(Croatia) I Sabanov (Croatia) M Sabanov	6	1	[10]
(India) VS Prashanth (Australia) S Puodziunas	6	4	[4]
2	(India) S Balaji (India) V Vardhan	3	6	[10]

Semifinals
1	(Belarus) A Vasilevski (Slovakia) I Zelenay	w/o
4	(Spain) G García López (Spain) D Marrero
(Croatia) I Sabanov (Croatia) M Sabanov	6	7^{7}
2	(India) S Balaji (India) V Vardhan	4	6^{3}

Final
1	(Belarus) A Vasilevski (Slovakia) I Zelenay	4	6	[10]
(Croatia) I Sabanov (Croatia) M Sabanov	6	4	[3]
