= 2026 BMW Open – Doubles =

Doubles
- 2026 BMW Open

Final
- Champions: (Germany) Jakob Schnaitter (Germany) Mark Wallner
- Runners-up: (France) Théo Arribagé (France) Albano Olivetti
- Score: 6–4, 6–7^{(4–7)}, [12–10]

Events
Singles	Doubles
- BMW Open

Qualifiers Jakob Schnaitter and Mark Wallner defeated Théo Arribagé and Albano Olivetti in the final, 6–4, 6–7^{(4–7)}, [12–10] to win the doubles tennis title at the 2026 Munich Open. It was the first ATP Tour title for both players, and they saved a championship point in the final.

André Göransson and Sem Verbeek were the reigning champions, but Verbeek did not participate this year. Göransson partnererd Evan King, but lost in the first round to Petr Nouza and Bart Stevens.

== Seeds ==
1. (Germany) Kevin Krawietz / (Germany) Tim Pütz (first round)
2. (France) Sadio Doumbia / (France) Fabien Reboul (quarterfinals)
3. (Sweden) André Göransson / (United States) Evan King (first round)
4. (Austria) Alexander Erler / (Austria) Lucas Miedler (first round)

== Draw ==
Key

- Q = Qualifier
- WC = Wild card
- LL = Lucky loser
- Alt = Alternate
- ITF = ITF entry
- PR = Protected ranking
- SR = Special ranking
- SE = Special exempt
- JE = Junior exempt
- JR = Junior Accelerator Programme entrant
- CO = College Accelerator Programme entrant
- NG = Next Gen Accelerator Program entrant
- w/o = Walkover
- r = Retired
- d = Defaulted

=== Draw ===
First round
1	(Germany) K Krawietz (Germany) T Pütz	5	6^{2}
(India) Y Bhambri (New Zealand) M Venus	7	7^{7}
WC	(United States) R Seggerman (United States) B Shelton	7^{7}	3	[10]
(Italy) L Darderi (Mexico) S González	6^{4}	6	[12]
3	(Sweden) A Göransson (United States) E King	6	2	[9]
LL	(Czech Republic) P Nouza (Netherlands) B Stevens	3	6	[11]
(Netherlands) S Arends (Netherlands) D Pel	5	6	[6]
Q	(Germany) J Schnaitter (Germany) M Wallner	7	3	[10]
LL	(United States) R Galloway (Australia) J Peers	6^{8}	6	[7]
(Brazil) O Luz (Brazil) R Matos	7^{10}	4	[10]
(United Kingdom) L Johnson (Poland) J Zieliński	6	6^{2}	[10]
4	(Austria) A Erler (Austria) L Miedler	4	7^{7}	[6]
(Argentina) F Cerúndolo (United States) A Michelsen	0	7^{9}	[6]
(France) T Arribagé (France) A Olivetti	6	6^{7}	[10]
(Brazil) M Melo (Germany) A Zverev	3	3
2	(France) S Doumbia (France) F Reboul	6	6

Quarterfinals
(India) Y Bhambri (New Zealand) M Venus	6	6
(Italy) L Darderi (Mexico) S González	4	1
LL	(Czech Republic) P Nouza (Netherlands) B Stevens	6^{3}	6	[7]
Q	(Germany) J Schnaitter (Germany) M Wallner	7^{7}	3	[10]
(Brazil) O Luz (Brazil) R Matos	6	6
(United Kingdom) L Johnson (Poland) J Zieliński	4	4
(France) T Arribagé (France) A Olivetti	4	6	[10]
2	(France) S Doumbia (France) F Reboul	6	3	[8]

Semifinals
(India) Y Bhambri (New Zealand) M Venus	1	5
Q	(Germany) J Schnaitter (Germany) M Wallner	6	7
(Brazil) O Luz (Brazil) R Matos	7	3	[8]
(France) T Arribagé (France) A Olivetti	5	6	[10]

Final
Q	(Germany) J Schnaitter (Germany) M Wallner	6	6^{4}	[12]
(France) T Arribagé (France) A Olivetti	4	7^{7}	[10]

== Qualifying ==
=== Seeds ===
1. (Germany) Jakob Schnaitter / (Germany) Mark Wallner (qualified)
2. (United States) Robert Galloway / (Australia) John Peers (qualifying competition, lucky losers)

=== Qualifiers ===
1. (Germany) Jakob Schnaitter / (Germany) Mark Wallner

=== Lucky losers ===
1. (United States) Robert Galloway / (Australia) John Peers
2. (Czech Republic) Petr Nouza / (Netherlands) Bart Stevens

=== Qualifying draw ===
First round
1	(Germany) Jakob Schnaitter (Germany) Mark Wallner	6	6
WC	(Germany) Justin Engel (Germany) Max Hans Rehberg	4	1
(Czech Republic) Petr Nouza (Netherlands) Bart Stevens	6^{4}	6^{4}
2	(United States) Robert Galloway (Australia) John Peers	7^{7}	7^{7}

Qualifying competition
1	(Germany) Jakob Schnaitter (Germany) Mark Wallner	4	6	[11]
2	(United States) Robert Galloway (Australia) John Peers	6	2	[9]
