= 2026 French Open – Men's doubles =

Tennis championship

Men's doubles
- 2026 French Open

Final
- Champions: (Spain) Marcel Granollers (Argentina) Horacio Zeballos
- Runners-up: (Finland) Harri Heliövaara (United Kingdom) Henry Patten
- Score: 6–4, 6–2
- Date: 6 June 2026

Details
- Draw: 64
- Seeds: 16

Events
Singles	men	women		boys	girls
Doubles	men	women	mixed	boys	girls
WC Singles	men	women	quad	boys	girls
WC Doubles	men	women	quad	boys	girls
- French Open

Defending champions Marcel Granollers and Horacio Zeballos defeated Harri Heliövaara and Henry Patten in the final, 6–4, 6–2 to win the men's doubles tennis title at the 2026 French Open. It was their third major title. They did not lose a set during the tournament.

Heliövaara and Patten jointly attained the ATP No. 1 doubles ranking after reaching the final. Neal Skupski, Zeballos and the pair of Julian Cash and Lloyd Glasspool were also in contention at the beginning of the tournament.

== Seeds ==
1. (Spain) Marcel Granollers / (Argentina) Horacio Zeballos (champions)
2. (Finland) Harri Heliövaara / (United Kingdom) Henry Patten (final)
3. (United Kingdom) Julian Cash / (United Kingdom) Lloyd Glasspool (second round)
4. (United States) Christian Harrison / (United Kingdom) Neal Skupski (second round)
5. (Italy) Simone Bolelli / (Italy) Andrea Vavassori (semifinals)
6. (Germany) Kevin Krawietz / (Germany) Tim Pütz (third round)
7. (El Salvador) Marcelo Arévalo / (Croatia) Mate Pavić (third round)
8. (Portugal) Francisco Cabral / (United Kingdom) Joe Salisbury (first round)
9. (Argentina) Guido Andreozzi / (France) Manuel Guinard (withdrew)
10. (Monaco) Hugo Nys / (France) Édouard Roger-Vasselin (quarterfinals)
11. (France) Sadio Doumbia / (France) Fabien Reboul (first round)
12. (United States) Austin Krajicek / (Croatia) Nikola Mektić (second round)
13. (France) Théo Arribagé / (France) Albano Olivetti (first round)
14. (Austria) Alexander Erler / (Austria) Lucas Miedler (third round, retired)
15. (United States) Robert Cash / (United States) JJ Tracy (second round)
16. (Brazil) Orlando Luz / (Brazil) Rafael Matos (first round)

Click on the seed number of a player to go to their draw section.

== Draw ==
Key

- Q = Qualifier
- WC = Wild card
- LL = Lucky loser
- Alt = Alternate
- ITF = ITF entry
- PR = Protected ranking
- SR = Special ranking
- SE = Special exempt
- JE = Junior exempt
- JR = Junior Accelerator Programme entrant
- CO = College Accelerator Programme entrant
- NG = Next Gen Accelerator Program entrant
- w/o = Walkover
- r = Retired
- d = Defaulted

=== Finals ===
Quarterfinals
1	(Spain) Marcel Granollers (Argentina) Horacio Zeballos	6	6
10	(Monaco) Hugo Nys (France) Édouard Roger-Vasselin	3	4
(Czech Republic) Petr Nouza (Austria) Neil Oberleitner	7^{9}	1	6^{12}
5	(Italy) Simone Bolelli (Italy) Andrea Vavassori	6^{7}	6	7^{14}
(Netherlands) Sander Arends (Netherlands) David Pel	4	4
(France) Quentin Halys (France) Pierre-Hugues Herbert	6	6
(India) Sriram Balaji (Brazil) Marcelo Demoliner	3	4
2	(Finland) Harri Heliövaara (United Kingdom) Henry Patten	6	6

Semifinals
1	(Spain) Marcel Granollers (Argentina) Horacio Zeballos	7^{7}	6
5	(Italy) Simone Bolelli (Italy) Andrea Vavassori	6^{4}	4
(France) Quentin Halys (France) Pierre-Hugues Herbert	3	4
2	(Finland) Harri Heliövaara (United Kingdom) Henry Patten	6	6

Final
1	(Spain) Marcel Granollers (Argentina) Horacio Zeballos	6	6
2	(Finland) Harri Heliövaara (United Kingdom) Henry Patten	4	2

=== Top half ===
==== Section 1 ====
First round
1	(Spain) M Granollers (Argentina) H Zeballos	6	6
(Hungary) M Fucsovics (United States) M Giron	3	2
(France) C Moutet (France) L Van Assche	6^{2}	7	4
(United States) V Kirkov (Netherlands) B Stevens	7^{7}	5	6
(United States) B Kittay (United States) R Ram	bye	0	0
Alternates	0	0	0
(Australia) R Hijikata (United States) R Seggerman	6^{4}	6^{4}
14	(Austria) A Erler (Austria) L Miedler	7^{7}	7^{7}
10	(Monaco) H Nys (France) É Roger-Vasselin	2	7^{7}	6
(Czech Republic) V Kopřiva (Poland) F Pieczonka	6	6^{5}	1
(Peru) I Buse (United States) M Kiger	5	7^{7}	6^{7}
(Chinese Taipei) R Ho (Germany) H Jebens	7	6^{5}	7^{10}
(Argentina) JM Cerúndolo (Argentina) M Navone
(Mexico) MÁ Reyes-Varela (Chile) A Tabilo	w/o
WC	(France) A Reymond (France) L Sanchez	6	6
8	(Portugal) F Cabral (United Kingdom) J Salisbury	4	2

Second round
1	(Spain) M Granollers (Argentina) H Zeballos	6	6
(United States) V Kirkov (Netherlands) B Stevens	3	4
(United States) B Kittay (United States) R Ram	5	6	4
14	(Austria) A Erler (Austria) L Miedler	7	4	6
10	(Monaco) H Nys (France) É Roger-Vasselin	6	6
(Chinese Taipei) R Ho (Germany) H Jebens	4	3
(Mexico) MÁ Reyes-Varela (Chile) A Tabilo	7^{7}	4	7
WC	(France) A Reymond (France) L Sanchez	6^{5}	6	5

Third round
1	(Spain) M Granollers (Argentina) H Zeballos	6	1
14	(Austria) A Erler (Austria) L Miedler	4	1^{r}
10	(Monaco) H Nys (France) É Roger-Vasselin	7^{9}	6
(Mexico) MÁ Reyes-Varela (Chile) A Tabilo	6^{7}	2

Quarterfinals
1	(Spain) M Granollers (Argentina) H Zeballos	6	6
10	(Monaco) H Nys (France) É Roger-Vasselin	3	4

==== Section 2 ====
First round
3	(United Kingdom) J Cash (United Kingdom) L Glasspool	6	7^{7}
Alt	(Ecuador) G Escobar (Netherlands) J-J Rojer	3	6^{5}
Alt	(New Zealand) F Reynolds (New Zealand) J Watt	6^{4}	3
(Czech Republic) A Pavlásek (Czech Republic) P Rikl	7^{7}	6
(Belgium) Z Bergs (Belgium) R Collignon	7^{8}	7^{7}
(Belgium) S Gillé (Netherlands) S Verbeek	6^{6}	6^{3}
(Czech Republic) P Nouza (Austria) N Oberleitner	7^{7}	7^{8}
13	(France) T Arribagé (France) A Olivetti	6^{2}	6^{6}
11	(France) S Doumbia (France) F Reboul	4	6	3
(Czech Republic) T Macháč (Czech Republic) M Vocel	6	3	6
(Switzerland) J Paul (United Kingdom) M Willis	6	6^{4}	7^{10}
Alt	(India) A Chandrasekar (Japan) T Yuzuki	3	7^{7}	6^{3}
(Argentina) F Cerúndolo (Argentina) M Kestelboim	5	2
(India) Y Bhambri (New Zealand) M Venus	7	6
Alt	(Australia) J Duckworth (Argentina) M Trungelliti	2	4
5	(Italy) S Bolelli (Italy) A Vavassori	6	6

Second round
3	(United Kingdom) J Cash (United Kingdom) L Glasspool	4	4
(Czech Republic) A Pavlásek (Czech Republic) P Rikl	6	6
(Belgium) Z Bergs (Belgium) R Collignon
(Czech Republic) P Nouza (Austria) N Oberleitner	w/o
(Czech Republic) T Macháč (Czech Republic) M Vocel
(Switzerland) J Paul (United Kingdom) M Willis	w/o
(India) Y Bhambri (New Zealand) M Venus	3	4
5	(Italy) S Bolelli (Italy) A Vavassori	6	6

Third round
(Czech Republic) A Pavlásek (Czech Republic) P Rikl	2	7^{7}	3
(Czech Republic) P Nouza (Austria) N Oberleitner	6	6^{1}	6
(Switzerland) J Paul (United Kingdom) M Willis	4	3
5	(Italy) S Bolelli (Italy) A Vavassori	6	6

Quarterfinals
(Czech Republic) P Nouza (Austria) N Oberleitner	7^{9}	1	6^{12}
5	(Italy) S Bolelli (Italy) A Vavassori	6^{7}	6	7^{14}

=== Bottom half ===
==== Section 3 ====
First round
7	(El Salvador) M Arévalo (Croatia) M Pavić	6	6
Alt	(United States) T Hilderbrand (United Kingdom) J Paris	3	1
Alt	(Canada) C Harper (United States) R Stalder	3	4
(United States) R Galloway (Australia) J Peers	6	6
WC	(France) A Géa (France) K Jacquet	4	3
(Netherlands) S Arends (Netherlands) D Pel	6	6
WC	(France) A Mannarino (France) F Martin	4	4
12	(United States) A Krajicek (Croatia) N Mektić	6	6
15	(United States) R Cash (United States) JJ Tracy	6	1	6
WC	(France) M Kouamé (France) G Mpetshi Perricard	4	6	4
Alt	(Colombia) N Barrientos (Uruguay) A Behar	3	7^{7}	3
WC	(France) T Droguet (France) H Gaston	6	6^{3}	6
(France) Q Halys (France) P-H Herbert	4	6	7
WC	(France) B Bonzi (France) G Jacq	6	3	5
(Brazil) M Melo (Argentina) A Molteni	3	1
4	(United States) C Harrison (United Kingdom) N Skupski	6	6

Second round
7	(El Salvador) M Arévalo (Croatia) M Pavić	6	3	6
(United States) R Galloway (Australia) J Peers	4	6	3
(Netherlands) S Arends (Netherlands) D Pel	4	7^{9}	7^{12}
12	(United States) A Krajicek (Croatia) N Mektić	6	6^{7}	6^{10}
15	(United States) R Cash (United States) JJ Tracy	6^{4}	6	4
WC	(France) T Droguet (France) H Gaston	7^{7}	4	6
(France) Q Halys (France) P-H Herbert	6	7^{9}
4	(United States) C Harrison (United Kingdom) N Skupski	4	6^{7}

Third round
7	(El Salvador) M Arévalo (Croatia) M Pavić	6	6^{7}	6^{6}
(Netherlands) S Arends (Netherlands) D Pel	3	7^{9}	7^{10}
WC	(France) T Droguet (France) H Gaston	3	3
(France) Q Halys (France) P-H Herbert	6	6

Quarterfinals
(Netherlands) S Arends (Netherlands) D Pel	4	4
(France) Q Halys (France) P-H Herbert	6	6

==== Section 4 ====
First round
6	(Germany) K Krawietz (Germany) T Pütz	7	7^{7}
PR	(Kazakhstan) A Golubev (Kazakhstan) A Nedovyesov	5	6^{4}
(Argentina) M González (Mexico) S González	5	6	6^{10}
(Argentina) RA Burruchaga (Argentina) TA Tirante	7	3	7^{12}
(Germany) C Frantzen (Netherlands) R Haase	3	6	3
(India) S Balaji (Brazil) M Demoliner	6	4	6
(Germany) J Schnaitter (Germany) M Wallner	w/o
9	(Argentina) G Andreozzi (France) M Guinard
16	(Brazil) O Luz (Brazil) R Matos	6^{7}	3
(Sweden) A Göransson (United States) E King	7^{9}	6
(Ecuador) D Hidalgo (United States) P Trhac	6	3	6
(Brazil) F Romboli (Australia) J-P Smith	4	6	3
WC	(France) C Chidekh (France) V Royer	6^{3}	4
(Italy) M Bellucci (Hungary) F Marozsán	7^{7}	6
PR	(Portugal) N Borges (China) Z Zhang	3	3
2	(Finland) H Heliövaara (United Kingdom) H Patten	6	6

Second round
6	(Germany) K Krawietz (Germany) T Pütz	6	6
(Argentina) RA Burruchaga (Argentina) TA Tirante	3	4
(India) S Balaji (Brazil) M Demoliner	7	6
(Germany) J Schnaitter (Germany) M Wallner	5	2
(Sweden) A Göransson (United States) E King	7^{7}	7^{7}
(Ecuador) D Hidalgo (United States) P Trhac	6^{2}	6^{4}
(Italy) M Bellucci (Hungary) F Marozsán	1	4
2	(Finland) H Heliövaara (United Kingdom) H Patten	6	6

Third round
6	(Germany) K Krawietz (Germany) T Pütz	5	4
(India) S Balaji (Brazil) M Demoliner	7	6
(Sweden) A Göransson (United States) E King	3	4
2	(Finland) H Heliövaara (United Kingdom) H Patten	6	6

Quarterfinals
(India) S Balaji (Brazil) M Demoliner	3	4
2	(Finland) H Heliövaara (United Kingdom) H Patten	6	6

== Seeded teams ==
The following are the seeded players. Seedings are based on ATP rankings as of 18 May 2026.

Country	Player	Country	Player	Rank	Seed
ESP	Marcel Granollers	ARG	Horacio Zeballos	5	1
FIN	Harri Heliövaara	GBR	Henry Patten	8	2
GBR	Julian Cash	GBR	Lloyd Glasspool	12	3
USA	Christian Harrison	GBR	Neal Skupski	12	4
ITA	Simone Bolelli	ITA	Andrea Vavassori	19	5
GER	Kevin Krawietz	GER	Tim Pütz	25	6
ESA	Marcelo Arévalo	CRO	Mate Pavić	28	7
POR	Francisco Cabral	GBR	Joe Salisbury	29	8
~~ARG~~	~~Guido Andreozzi~~	~~FRA~~	~~Manuel Guinard~~	~~33~~	~~9~~
MON	Hugo Nys	FRA	Édouard Roger-Vasselin	39	10
FRA	Sadio Doumbia	FRA	Fabien Reboul	50	11
USA	Austin Krajicek	CRO	Nikola Mektić	51	12
FRA	Théo Arribagé	FRA	Albano Olivetti	54	13
AUT	Alexander Erler	AUT	Lucas Miedler	57	14
USA	Robert Cash	USA	JJ Tracy	63	15
BRA	Orlando Luz	BRA	Rafael Matos	63	16

== Other entry information ==
=== Wildcards ===
- (France) Benjamin Bonzi / (France) Grégoire Jacq
- (France) Clément Chidekh / (France) Valentin Royer
- (France) Titouan Droguet / (France) Hugo Gaston
- (France) Arthur Géa / (France) Kyrian Jacquet
- (France) Moïse Kouamé / (France) Giovanni Mpetshi Perricard
- (France) Adrian Mannarino / (France) Fabrice Martin
- (France) Arthur Reymond / (France) Luca Sanchez

=== Protected ranking ===
- (Portugal) Nuno Borges / (China) Zhang Zhizhen
- (Kazakhstan) Andrey Golubev / (Kazakhstan) Aleksandr Nedovyesov
- ~~(Serbia) Miomir Kecmanović / (Australia) Thanasi Kokkinakis~~

=== Alternates ===
- (Colombia) Nicolás Barrientos / (Uruguay) Ariel Behar
- (India) Anirudh Chandrasekar / (Japan) Takeru Yuzuki
- (Australia) James Duckworth / (Argentina) Marco Trungelliti
- (Ecuador) Gonzalo Escobar / (Netherlands) Jean-Julien Rojer
- (Canada) Cleeve Harper / (United States) Reese Stalder
- (United States) Trey Hilderbrand / (United Kingdom) Joshua Paris
- (New Zealand) Finn Reynolds / (New Zealand) James Watt

=== Withdrawals ===
- § (Argentina) Guido Andreozzi / (France) Manuel Guinard → not replaced, no alternates signed in
- § (Monaco) Romain Arneodo / (Australia) Marc Polmans → replaced by (Ecuador) Gonzalo Escobar / (Netherlands) Jean-Julien Rojer
- § (Kazakhstan) Alexander Bublik / (Kazakhstan) Alexander Shevchenko → not replaced, no alternates signed in
- § (Spain) Pablo Carreño Busta / (Spain) Jaume Munar → replaced by (Australia) James Duckworth / (Argentina) Marco Trungelliti
- § (Argentina) Juan Manuel Cerúndolo / (Argentina) Mariano Navone → not replaced, no alternates signed in
- § (Argentina) Tomás Martín Etcheverry / (Argentina) Camilo Ugo Carabelli → replaced by (India) Anirudh Chandrasekar / (Japan) Takeru Yuzuki
- § (Netherlands) Tallon Griekspoor / (Netherlands) Botic van de Zandschulp → replaced by (New Zealand) Finn Reynolds / (New Zealand) James Watt
- ‡ (United Kingdom) Luke Johnson / (Poland) Jan Zieliński → replaced by (Canada) Cleeve Harper / (United States) Reese Stalder
- § (Serbia) Miomir Kecmanović / (Australia) Thanasi Kokkinakis → replaced by (Colombia) Nicolás Barrientos / (Uruguay) Ariel Behar
- § (France) Arthur Rinderknech / (Monaco) Valentin Vacherot → replaced by (United States) Trey Hilderbrand / (United Kingdom) Joshua Paris

‡ – withdrew from entry list
§ – withdrew from main draw
