= 2025 Schwaben Open =

- Date: 18–23 August
- Edition: 4th
- Category: ATP Challenger
- Surface: Clay
- Location: Augsburg, Germany

Champions

Singles
- (Germany) Cedrik-Marcel Stebe

Doubles
- (Germany) Daniel Masur / (Germany) Benito Sanchez Martinez
- Schwaben Open

The 2025 Schwaben Open was a professional tennis tournament played on clay courts. It was the fourth edition of the tournament which was part of the 2025 ATP Challenger Tour. It took place in Augsburg, Germany between 18 and 23 August 2025.

== Singles main-draw entrants ==
=== Seeds ===
Country	Player	Rank^{1}	Seed
BOL	Juan Carlos Prado Ángelo	261	1
GER	Christoph Negritu	263	2
GER	Patrick Zahraj	270	3
CRO	Mili Poljičak	279	4
CZE	Hynek Bartoň	300	5
ESP	Nikolás Sánchez Izquierdo	306	6
FRA	Corentin Denolly	310	7
SUI	Alexander Ritschard	312	8

- ^{1} Rankings are as of 4 August 2025.

=== Other entrants ===
The following players received wildcards into the singles main draw:

- (Germany) Daniel Masur
- (Germany) Mika Petkovic
- (Germany) Max Schönhaus

The following player received entry into the singles main draw using a protected ranking:

- (Germany) Cedrik-Marcel Stebe

The following player received entry into the singles main draw as an alternate:

- (Czech Republic) Jakub Nicod

The following players received entry from the qualifying draw:

- (Czech Republic) Matyáš Černý
- (Germany) Nino Ehrenschneider
- (Belgium) Buvaysar Gadamauri
- (Czech Republic) Tadeáš Paroulek
- (Serbia) Stefan Popović
- (Germany) Benito Sanchez Martinez

== Champions ==
=== Singles ===
- (Germany) Cedrik-Marcel Stebe def. (Switzerland) Alexander Ritschard 6–3, 6–3.

=== Doubles ===
- (Germany) Daniel Masur / (Germany) Benito Sanchez Martinez def. (Czech Republic) Jiří Barnat / (Czech Republic) Filip Duda 7–6^{(7–2)}, 6–2.
