= 2024 Schwaben Open – Doubles =

Doubles
- 2024 Schwaben Open

Final
- Champions: (Germany) Jakob Schnaitter (Germany) Mark Wallner
- Runners-up: (Austria) David Pichler (Czech Republic) Michael Vrbenský
- Score: 3–6, 6–2, [10–8]

Events
Singles	Doubles
- Schwaben Open

Constantin Frantzen and Hendrik Jebens were the defending champions but chose not to defend their title.

Jakob Schnaitter and Mark Wallner won the title after defeating David Pichler and Michael Vrbenský 3–6, 6–2, [10–8] in the final.

== Seeds ==
1. (Germany) Jakob Schnaitter / (Germany) Mark Wallner (champions)
2. (Sweden) Simon Freund / (Denmark) Johannes Ingildsen (semifinals)
3. (Brazil) Mateus Alves / (Australia) Adam Taylor (first round)
4. (Belgium) Michael Geerts / (United States) Alex Lawson (semifinals)

== Draw ==
Key

- Q = Qualifier
- WC = Wild card
- LL = Lucky loser
- Alt = Alternate
- ITF = ITF entry
- PR = Protected ranking
- SR = Special ranking
- SE = Special exempt
- JE = Junior exempt
- JR = Junior Accelerator Programme entrant
- CO = College Accelerator Programme entrant
- NG = Next Gen Accelerator Program entrant
- w/o = Walkover
- r = Retired
- d = Defaulted

=== Draw ===
First round
1	(Germany) J Schnaitter (Germany) M Wallner	6	6
Alt	(Italy) R Bonadio (Italy) Andrea Picchione	4	3
(Italy) Federico Iannaccone (Italy) Luca Potenza	2	6^{3}
WC	(Germany) Yannik Kelm (Germany) Vincent Marysko	6	7^{7}
4	(Belgium) M Geerts (United States) A Lawson	6	6
PR	(France) E Furness (Brazil) Gabriel Roveri Sidney	3	2
(Croatia) Z Babić (Syria) H Naw	6	3	[12]
WC	(Germany) Michael Feucht (Germany) Christopher Frantzen	4	6	[10]
(Austria) D Pichler (Czech Republic) M Vrbenský	6	6
(Austria) S Kopp (Netherlands) M Veldheer	2	3
(Brazil) D Dutra da Silva (Brazil) PA Saraiva dos Santos	6	7
3	(Brazil) M Alves (Australia) A Taylor	2	5
(Argentina) FA Gómez (Paraguay) AD Vallejo	6	7^{7}
(Germany) Lucas Gerch (Denmark) A Holmgren	2	6^{5}
Alt	(Switzerland) Dario Huber (Germany) Jacob Kahoun	2	5
2	(Sweden) S Freund (Denmark) J Ingildsen	6	7

Quarterfinals
1	(Germany) J Schnaitter (Germany) M Wallner	6	6
WC	(Germany) Y Kelm (Germany) V Marysko	2	2
4	(Belgium) M Geerts (United States) A Lawson	6	4	[10]
(Croatia) Z Babić (Syria) H Naw	2	6	[6]
(Austria) D Pichler (Czech Republic) M Vrbenský	6	7
(Brazil) D Dutra da Silva (Brazil) PA Saraiva dos Santos	2	5
(Argentina) FA Gómez (Paraguay) AD Vallejo	3	5
2	(Sweden) S Freund (Denmark) J Ingildsen	6	7

Semifinals
1	(Germany) J Schnaitter (Germany) M Wallner	6	6
4	(Belgium) M Geerts (United States) A Lawson	2	3
(Austria) D Pichler (Czech Republic) M Vrbenský	7	6
2	(Sweden) S Freund (Denmark) J Ingildsen	5	4

Final
1	(Germany) J Schnaitter (Germany) M Wallner	3	6	[10]
(Austria) D Pichler (Czech Republic) M Vrbenský	6	2	[8]
