= 2024 Schwaben Open – Singles =

Singles
- 2024 Schwaben Open

Final
- Champion: (Kazakhstan) Timofey Skatov
- Runner-up: (Denmark) Elmer Møller
- Score: 3–6, 7–5, 6–3

Events
Singles	Doubles
- Schwaben Open

Carlos Taberner was the defending champion but lost in the quarterfinals to Elmer Møller.

Timofey Skatov won the title after defeating Møller 3–6, 7–5, 6–3 in the final.

== Seeds ==
1. (Kazakhstan) Timofey Skatov (champion)
2. (Argentina) Andrea Collarini (second round)
3. (Lithuania) Vilius Gaubas (second round)
4. (Czech Republic) Michael Vrbenský (second round)
5. (Paraguay) Daniel Vallejo (first round)
6. (Denmark) August Holmgren (first round)
7. (Germany) Marvin Möller (withdrew)
8. (Denmark) Elmer Møller (final)

== Draw ==
Key

- Q = Qualifier
- WC = Wild card
- LL = Lucky loser
- Alt = Alternate
- ITF = ITF entry
- PR = Protected ranking
- SR = Special ranking
- SE = Special exempt
- JE = Junior exempt
- JR = Junior Accelerator Programme entrant
- CO = College Accelerator Programme entrant
- NG = Next Gen Accelerator Program entrant
- w/o = Walkover
- r = Retired
- d = Defaulted

=== Finals ===
Semifinals
1	(Kazakhstan) Timofey Skatov	7	7
(Germany) Daniel Masur	5	5
8	(Denmark) Elmer Møller	3	6	7
(Italy) Riccardo Bonadio	6	2	5

Final
1	(Kazakhstan) Timofey Skatov	3	7	6
8	(Denmark) Elmer Møller	6	5	3

=== Top half ===
First round
1	(Kazakhstan) T Skatov	6	6
(Egypt) M Safwat	4	3
Q	(Italy) Andrea Picchione	4	7	4
Q	(Slovakia) N Gombos	6	5	6
Alt	(United States) T Kodat	7^{9}	4	6
WC	(Germany) O Otte	6^{7}	6	3
(Mexico) R Pacheco Méndez	6	6
5	(Paraguay) AD Vallejo	4	3
3	(Lithuania) V Gaubas	7^{7}	6
PR	(France) E Furness	6^{2}	3
(Belgium) M Geerts	1	7	4
(Germany) D Masur	6	5	6
Alt	(Germany) Lucas Gerch	6	7
Q	(Italy) Luca Giacomini	4	5
(Poland) D Michalski	6	6
6	(Denmark) A Holmgren	2	2

Second round
1	(Kazakhstan) T Skatov	6	2	6
Q	(Slovakia) N Gombos	4	6	1
Alt	(United States) T Kodat	6	6
(Mexico) R Pacheco Méndez	2	1
3	(Lithuania) V Gaubas	6^{5}	3
(Germany) D Masur	7^{7}	6
Alt	(Germany) L Gerch	3	6	6
(Poland) D Michalski	6	3	2

Quarterfinals
1	(Kazakhstan) T Skatov	7^{7}	6
Alt	(United States) T Kodat	6^{4}	4
(Germany) D Masur	6	6
Alt	(Germany) L Gerch	3	2

Semifinals
1	(Kazakhstan) T Skatov	7	7
(Germany) D Masur	5	5

=== Bottom half ===
First round
8	(Denmark) E Møller	6	7
(Germany) M Topo	4	5
WC	(Germany) T Gentzsch	6	7^{7}
(United Kingdom) F Gill	1	6^{3}
(Spain) C Taberner	6	6
(Tunisia) M Echargui	4	3
WC	(Germany) Liam Gavrielides	1	1
4	(Czech Republic) M Vrbenský	6	6
Q	(Brazil) D Dutra da Silva	7^{7}	5	2
Q	(Germany) D Dedura-Palomero	6^{1}	7	6
(Italy) R Bonadio	6	6
(Syria) H Naw	3	0
Q	(Italy) Luca Potenza	1	0
(Argentina) FA Gómez	6	6
LL	(Brazil) M Alves	3	1
2	(Argentina) A Collarini	6	6

Second round
8	(Denmark) E Møller	6	3
WC	(Germany) T Gentzsch	0	0^{r}
(Spain) C Taberner	7	6
4	(Czech Republic) M Vrbenský	5	4
Q	(Germany) D Dedura-Palomero	4	6^{5}
(Italy) R Bonadio	6	7^{7}
(Argentina) FA Gómez	6	6
2	(Argentina) A Collarini	3	4

Quarterfinals
8	(Denmark) E Møller	6	4	6
(Spain) C Taberner	4	6	4
(Italy) R Bonadio	1	6	6
(Argentina) FA Gómez	6	2	3

Semifinals
8	(Denmark) E Møller	3	6	7
(Italy) R Bonadio	6	2	5
