= 2025 French Open – Men's doubles =

Men's doubles
- 2025 French Open

Final
- Champions: (Spain) Marcel Granollers (Argentina) Horacio Zeballos
- Runners-up: (United Kingdom) Joe Salisbury (United Kingdom) Neal Skupski
- Score: 6–0, 6–7^{(5–7)}, 7–5

Events
Singles	men	women		boys	girls
Doubles	men	women	mixed	boys	girls
WC Singles	men	women	quad	boys	girls
WC Doubles	men	women	quad	boys	girls
- French Open

Marcel Granollers and Horacio Zeballos defeated Joe Salisbury and Neal Skupski in the final, 6–0, 6–7^{(5–7)}, 7–5 to win the men's doubles tennis title at the 2025 French Open. It was both players' first major men's doubles title, following five previous runner-up finishes for Granollers and three for Zeballos.

Marcelo Arévalo and Mate Pavić were the defending champions, but lost in the third round to Hugo Nys and Édouard Roger-Vasselin. Despite their loss, Arévalo and Pavić retained the world No. 1 doubles ranking after Harri Heliövaara lost in the quarterfinals.

This marked the final French Open appearance of former doubles world No. 1 and two-time doubles champion Nicolas Mahut, who announced that he would retire from professional tennis at the end of the 2025 season. He partnered Pierre-Hugues Herbert but they lost in the first round to Simone Bolelli and Andrea Vavassori.

== Seeds ==
1. (El Salvador) Marcelo Arévalo / (Croatia) Mate Pavić (third round)
2. (Finland) Harri Heliövaara / (United Kingdom) Henry Patten (quarterfinals)
3. (Germany) Kevin Krawietz / (Germany) Tim Pütz (second round)
4. (Italy) Simone Bolelli / (Italy) Andrea Vavassori (third round)
5. (Spain) Marcel Granollers / (Argentina) Horacio Zeballos (champions)
6. (United Kingdom) Julian Cash / (United Kingdom) Lloyd Glasspool (third round)
7. (Croatia) Nikola Mektić / (New Zealand) Michael Venus (second round)
8. (United Kingdom) Joe Salisbury / (United Kingdom) Neal Skupski (final)
9. (United States) Christian Harrison / (United States) Evan King (semifinals)
10. (Argentina) Máximo González / (Argentina) Andrés Molteni (first round)
11. (United States) Nathaniel Lammons / (United States) Jackson Withrow (first round)
12. (Sweden) André Göransson / (Netherlands) Sem Verbeek (second round)
13. (France) Sadio Doumbia / (France) Fabien Reboul (second round)
14. (United Kingdom) Jamie Murray / (United States) Rajeev Ram (first round)
15. (Australia) Matthew Ebden / (Australia) John Peers (quarterfinals)
16. (Monaco) Hugo Nys / (France) Édouard Roger-Vasselin (semifinals)

Click on the seed number of a player to go to their draw section.

== Draw ==
Key

- Q = Qualifier
- WC = Wild card
- LL = Lucky loser
- Alt = Alternate
- ITF = ITF entry
- PR = Protected ranking
- SR = Special ranking
- SE = Special exempt
- JE = Junior exempt
- JR = Junior Accelerator Programme entrant
- CO = College Accelerator Programme entrant
- NG = Next Gen Accelerator Program entrant
- w/o = Walkover
- r = Retired
- d = Defaulted

=== Finals ===
Quarterfinals
16	(Monaco) Hugo Nys (France) Édouard Roger-Vasselin	6	3	6
(Netherlands) Sander Arends (United Kingdom) Luke Johnson	4	6	2
(Croatia) Ivan Dodig (Brazil) Orlando Luz	2	6^{4}
5	(Spain) Marcel Granollers (Argentina) Horacio Zeballos	6	7^{7}
8	(United Kingdom) Joe Salisbury (United Kingdom) Neal Skupski	6^{4}	6	6
15	(Australia) Matthew Ebden (Australia) John Peers	7^{7}	4	4
9	(United States) Christian Harrison (United States) Evan King	6	6
2	(Finland) Harri Heliövaara (United Kingdom) Henry Patten	3	4

Semifinals
16	(Monaco) Hugo Nys (France) Édouard Roger-Vasselin	7^{7}	3	4
5	(Spain) Marcel Granollers (Argentina) Horacio Zeballos	6^{5}	6	6
8	(United Kingdom) Joe Salisbury (United Kingdom) Neal Skupski	6^{5}	6	7^{10}
9	(United States) Christian Harrison (United States) Evan King	7^{7}	3	6^{7}

Final
5	(Spain) Marcel Granollers (Argentina) Horacio Zeballos	6	6^{5}	7
8	(United Kingdom) Joe Salisbury (United Kingdom) Neal Skupski	0	7^{7}	5

=== Top half ===
==== Section 1 ====
First round
1	(El Salvador) M Arévalo (Croatia) M Pavić	6	6
(Spain) P Martínez (Spain) J Munar	3	2
(Italy) M Bellucci (Hungary) F Marozsán	6	6
PR	(United States) J Brooksby (United States) M Giron	4	4
Alt	(Australia) J Duckworth (Australia) A Vukic	7^{7}	6
(Tunisia) S Mansouri (Netherlands) J-J Rojer	6^{2}	2
(Uruguay) A Behar (Belgium) J Vliegen	7^{7}	6^{3}	3
16	(Monaco) H Nys (France) É Roger-Vasselin	6^{4}	7^{7}	6
10	(Argentina) M González (Argentina) A Molteni	6^{4}	5
Alt	(Switzerland) J Paul (Netherlands) D Pel	7^{7}	7
(Brazil) M Demoliner (Chile) N Jarry	6	3	6^{6}
(Netherlands) S Arends (United Kingdom) L Johnson	3	6	7^{10}
(United States) R Seggerman (United States) L Tien	6	4	6
WC	(France) A Géa (France) M Kouamé	4	6	3
(Australia) R Hijikata (Serbia) M Kecmanović	6	2	3
6	(United Kingdom) J Cash (United Kingdom) L Glasspool	4	6	6

Second round
1	(El Salvador) M Arévalo (Croatia) M Pavić	6	6
(Italy) M Bellucci (Hungary) F Marozsán	4	4
Alt	(Australia) J Duckworth (Australia) A Vukic	2	2
16	(Monaco) H Nys (France) É Roger-Vasselin	6	6
Alt	(Switzerland) J Paul (Netherlands) D Pel	4	1
(Netherlands) S Arends (United Kingdom) L Johnson	6	6
(United States) R Seggerman (United States) L Tien	5	6^{5}
6	(United Kingdom) J Cash (United Kingdom) L Glasspool	7	7^{7}

Third round
1	(El Salvador) M Arévalo (Croatia) M Pavić	6	1	4
16	(Monaco) H Nys (France) É Roger-Vasselin	1	6	6
(Netherlands) S Arends (United Kingdom) L Johnson	6	2	7^{10}
6	(United Kingdom) J Cash (United Kingdom) L Glasspool	3	6	6^{7}

Quarterfinals
16	(Monaco) H Nys (France) É Roger-Vasselin	6	3	6
(Netherlands) S Arends (United Kingdom) L Johnson	4	6	2

==== Section 2 ====
First round
3	(Germany) K Krawietz (Germany) T Pütz	6	6
Alt	(Poland) K Drzewiecki (Poland) P Matuszewski	3	3
WC	(France) G Blancaneaux (France) V Royer	6	3	4
(Croatia) I Dodig (Brazil) O Luz	3	6	6
(Brazil) F Romboli (Australia) J-P Smith	6	3	6
(Greece) Pe Tsitsipas (Greece) S Tsitsipas	4	6	3
WC	(France) A Cazaux (France) H Mayot	6	6
14	(United Kingdom) J Murray (United States) R Ram	4	4
11	(United States) N Lammons (United States) J Withrow	6	3	4
(Mexico) S González (United States) A Krajicek	4	6	6
(France) Q Halys (France) A Olivetti	7^{7}	7^{7}
(Australia) J Kubler (Australia) J Thompson	6^{5}	6^{3}
(Austria) A Erler (Germany) C Frantzen	2	6	7^{10}
(Italy) L Darderi (Ecuador) D Hidalgo	6	3	6^{5}
(Portugal) F Cabral (Austria) L Miedler	6^{2}	3
5	(Spain) M Granollers (Argentina) H Zeballos	7^{7}	6

Second round
3	(Germany) K Krawietz (Germany) T Pütz	6	6^{4}	3
(Croatia) I Dodig (Brazil) O Luz	3	7^{7}	6
(Brazil) F Romboli (Australia) J-P Smith	7	6^{7}	6
WC	(France) A Cazaux (France) H Mayot	5	7^{9}	4
(Mexico) S González (United States) A Krajicek	7^{7}	6
(France) Q Halys (France) A Olivetti	6^{5}	4
(Austria) A Erler (Germany) C Frantzen	3	1
5	(Spain) M Granollers (Argentina) H Zeballos	6	6

Third round
(Croatia) I Dodig (Brazil) O Luz	4	7^{7}	6
(Brazil) F Romboli (Australia) J-P Smith	6	6^{5}	4
(Mexico) S González (United States) A Krajicek	2	1
5	(Spain) M Granollers (Argentina) H Zeballos	6	6

Quarterfinals
(Croatia) I Dodig (Brazil) O Luz	2	6^{4}
5	(Spain) M Granollers (Argentina) H Zeballos	6	7^{7}

=== Bottom half ===
==== Section 3 ====
First round
8	(United Kingdom) J Salisbury (United Kingdom) N Skupski	6	6
Alt	(Germany) A Mies; R Safiullin	2	4
(Argentina) G Andreozzi (France) T Arribagé	6	6
(Argentina) S Báez (Argentina) F Comesaña	4	4
(Belgium) Z Bergs (Netherlands) J de Jong	6	2	3
(Portugal) N Borges (France) A Rinderknech	3	6	6
(France) G Mpetshi Perricard (France) A Müller	4	6^{6}
12	(Sweden) A Göransson (Netherlands) S Verbeek	6	7^{8}
15	(Australia) M Ebden (Australia) J Peers	3	6	7^{10}
WC	(France) U Blanchet (France) K Jacquet	6	3	6^{4}
(Germany) J Schnaitter (Germany) M Wallner	6	3	6
(Netherlands) T Griekspoor (Netherlands) B Stevens	2	6	3
(China) Y Bu (Argentina) C Ugo Carabelli	2	1
(India) S Balaji (Mexico) MÁ Reyes-Varela	6	6
WC	(France) P-H Herbert (France) N Mahut	6^{2}	2
4	(Italy) S Bolelli (Italy) A Vavassori	7^{7}	6

Second round
8	(United Kingdom) J Salisbury (United Kingdom) N Skupski	7	6
(Argentina) G Andreozzi (France) T Arribagé	5	4
(Portugal) N Borges (France) A Rinderknech	6	6
12	(Sweden) A Göransson (Netherlands) S Verbeek	3	2
15	(Australia) M Ebden (Australia) J Peers	7^{7}	6
(Germany) J Schnaitter (Germany) M Wallner	6^{4}	3
(India) S Balaji (Mexico) MÁ Reyes-Varela	3	4
4	(Italy) S Bolelli (Italy) A Vavassori	6	6

Third round
8	(United Kingdom) J Salisbury (United Kingdom) N Skupski	7^{7}	6
(Portugal) N Borges (France) A Rinderknech	6^{5}	4
15	(Australia) M Ebden (Australia) J Peers	6	7^{8}
4	(Italy) S Bolelli (Italy) A Vavassori	2	6^{6}

Quarterfinals
8	(United Kingdom) J Salisbury (United Kingdom) N Skupski	6^{4}	6	6
15	(Australia) M Ebden (Australia) J Peers	7^{7}	4	4

==== Section 4 ====
First round
7	(Croatia) N Mektić (New Zealand) M Venus	6	1	6
(France) G Jacq (Australia) MC Romios	4	6	4
(India) Y Bhambri (United States) R Galloway	6	6^{8}	6
(Netherlands) R Haase (Germany) H Jebens	3	7^{10}	3
(Brazil) R Matos (Brazil) M Melo	3	4
(Monaco) R Arneodo (France) M Guinard	6	6
(Belgium) S Gillé (Poland) J Zieliński	3	4
9	(United States) C Harrison (United States) E King	6	6
13	(France) S Doumbia (France) F Reboul	6	6
WC	(France) G Barrère (France) A Mannarino	3	1
(India) R Bopanna (Czech Republic) A Pavlásek	7^{8}	5	6
(United States) R Cash (United States) JJ Tracy	6^{6}	7	1
(Canada) G Diallo (United Kingdom) J Fearnley	6	6
(Colombia) N Barrientos (India) RC Bollipalli	0	2
(Czech Republic) P Nouza (Czech Republic) P Rikl	3	4
2	(Finland) H Heliövaara (United Kingdom) H Patten	6	6

Second round
7	(Croatia) N Mektić (New Zealand) M Venus	7^{7}	6^{4}	3
(India) Y Bhambri (United States) R Galloway	6^{4}	7^{7}	6
(Monaco) R Arneodo (France) M Guinard	4	0
9	(United States) C Harrison (United States) E King	6	6
13	(France) S Doumbia (France) F Reboul	7^{7}	6^{5}	2
(India) R Bopanna (Czech Republic) A Pavlásek	6^{2}	7^{7}	6
(Canada) G Diallo (United Kingdom) J Fearnley	2	3
2	(Finland) H Heliövaara (United Kingdom) H Patten	6	6

Third round
(India) Y Bhambri (United States) R Galloway	4	4
9	(United States) C Harrison (United States) E King	6	6
(India) R Bopanna (Czech Republic) A Pavlásek	2	6^{5}
2	(Finland) H Heliövaara (United Kingdom) H Patten	6	7^{7}

Quarterfinals
9	(United States) C Harrison (United States) E King	6	6
2	(Finland) H Heliövaara (United Kingdom) H Patten	3	4

== Seeded teams ==
The following are the seeded teams. Seedings are based on ATP rankings as of 19 May 2025.

Country	Player	Country	Player	Rank	Seed
ESA	Marcelo Arévalo	CRO	Mate Pavić	2	1
FIN	Harri Heliövaara	GBR	Henry Patten	7	2
GER	Kevin Krawietz	GER	Tim Pütz	11	3
ITA	Simone Bolelli	ITA	Andrea Vavassori	17	4
ESP	Marcel Granollers	ARG	Horacio Zeballos	21	5
GBR	Julian Cash	GBR	Lloyd Glasspool	29	6
CRO	Nikola Mektić	NZL	Michael Venus	31	7
GBR	Joe Salisbury	GBR	Neal Skupski	35	8
USA	Christian Harrison	USA	Evan King	37	9
ARG	Máximo González	ARG	Andrés Molteni	42	10
USA	Nathaniel Lammons	USA	Jackson Withrow	47	11
SWE	André Göransson	NED	Sem Verbeek	55	12
FRA	Sadio Doumbia	FRA	Fabien Reboul	56	13
GBR	Jamie Murray	USA	Rajeev Ram	58	14
AUS	Matthew Ebden	AUS	John Peers	66	15
MON	Hugo Nys	FRA	Édouard Roger-Vasselin	71	16

== Other entry information ==
=== Wildcards ===
- (France) Grégoire Barrère / (France) Adrian Mannarino
- (France) Geoffrey Blancaneaux / (France) Valentin Royer
- (France) Ugo Blanchet / (France) Kyrian Jacquet
- (France) Arthur Cazaux / (France) Harold Mayot
- ~~(France) Hugo Gaston / (France) Corentin Moutet~~
- (France) Arthur Géa / (France) Moïse Kouamé
- (France) Pierre-Hugues Herbert / (France) Nicolas Mahut

=== Protected ranking ===
- (United States) Jenson Brooksby / (United States) Marcos Giron

=== Alternates ===
- (Poland) Karol Drzewiecki / (Poland) Piotr Matuszewski
- (Australia) James Duckworth / (Australia) Aleksandar Vukic
- (Germany) Andreas Mies / Roman Safiullin
- (Switzerland) Jakub Paul / (Netherlands) David Pel

=== Withdrawals ===
- ‡ (Belgium) Zizou Bergs / (Belgium) Raphaël Collignon → replaced by (Belgium) Zizou Bergs / (Netherlands) Jesper de Jong
- § (Argentina) Francisco Cerúndolo / (Argentina) Tomás Martín Etcheverry → replaced by (Germany) Andreas Mies / Roman Safiullin
- § (Italy) Flavio Cobolli / (Czech Republic) Tomáš Macháč → replaced by (Poland) Karol Drzewiecki / (Poland) Piotr Matuszewski
- ‡ (Spain) Alejandro Davidovich Fokina / (Germany) Andreas Mies → replaced by (United States) Ryan Seggerman / (United States) Learner Tien
- ‡ (Brazil) Marcelo Demoliner / Daniil Medvedev → replaced by (Brazil) Marcelo Demoliner / (Chile) Nicolás Jarry
- § (Bosnia and Herzegovina) Damir Džumhur / (Serbia) Hamad Medjedovic → replaced by (Switzerland) Jakub Paul / (Netherlands) David Pel
- § (France) Hugo Gaston / (France) Corentin Moutet → replaced by (Australia) James Duckworth / (Australia) Aleksandar Vukic
- ‡ (Australia) Nick Kyrgios / (Australia) Jordan Thompson → replaced by (Australia) Jason Kubler / (Australia) Jordan Thompson

‡ – withdrew from entry list
§ – withdrew from main draw
