= Benito Sanchez Martinez =

German tennis player (born 2002)

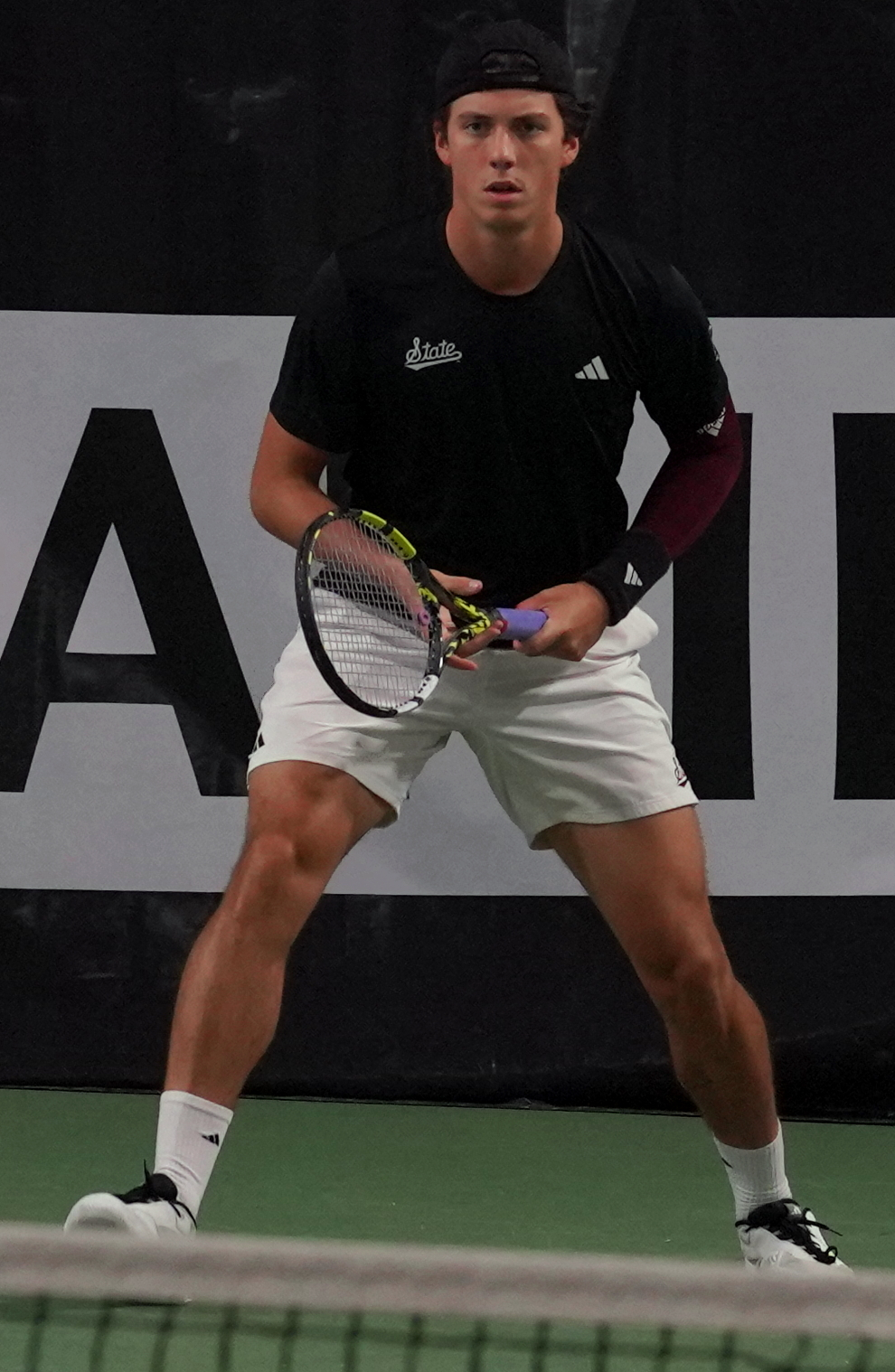
- Sanchez Martinez in 2025
- Country (sports): Germany
- Born: 30 April 2002 (age 24) Berlin, Germany
- Height: 1.85 m (6 ft 1 in)
- Plays: Left-handed
- College: Mississippi State
- Prize money: US $31,890

Singles
- Career record: 0–0 (at ATP Tour level, Grand Slam level, and in Davis Cup)
- Career titles: 1 ITF
- Highest ranking: No. 839 (25 August 2025)
- Current ranking: No. 850 (9 November 2026)

Doubles
- Career record: 0–0 (at ATP Tour level, Grand Slam level, and in Davis Cup)
- Career titles: 1 Challenger
- Highest ranking: No. 408 (25 August 2025)
- Current ranking: No. 1,299 (9 November 2026)
- Last updated on: 9 November 2026.

Benito Sanchez Martinez (born 30 April 2002) is a German tennis player. He has a career high ATP singles ranking of world No. 839 achieved on 25 August 2025, and a best doubles ranking of No. 408 attained on 25 August 2025.

Sanchez Martinez has won one ATP Challenger doubles title at the 2025 Schwaben Open.

Sanchez Martinez plays college tennis at Mississippi State.

== ATP Challenger Tour finals ==
=== Doubles: 1 (1 title) ===
Finals by surface
Hard (0–0)
Clay (1–0)

Result	W–L	Date	Tournament	Surface	Partner	Opponents	Score
Win	1–0	Aug 2025	Schwaben Open, Germany	Clay	(Germany) Daniel Masur	(Czech Republic) Jiří Barnat (Czech Republic) Filip Duda	7–6^{(7–2)}, 6–2

== ITF World Tennis Tour finals ==
=== Singles: 2 (1 title, 1 runner-up) ===
Result	W–L	Date	Tournament	Surface	Opponent	Score
Win	1–0	Sep 2024	M15 Fayetteville, United States	Hard	(Italy) Niccolò Baroni	6–2, 6–2
Loss	1–1	Jun 2026	M15 Kamen, Germany	Clay	(Ukraine) Oleksii Krutykh	1–6, 3–6

=== Doubles: 2 (1 title, 1 runner-up) ===
Result	W–L	Date	Tournament	Surface	Partner	Opponents	Score
Loss	0–1	Sep 2021	M15 Allershausen, Germany	Clay	(Germany) Milan Welte	(Germany) Niklas Schell (Germany) Constantin Schmitz	6–7^{(5–7)}, 3–6
Win	1–1	Oct 2026	M15 Monastir, Tunisia	Hard	(Germany) Tim Hammes	(France) César Bouchelaghem (Belgium) Lars Goran Verwerft	6–4, 7–6^{(7–4)}
