= Théo Arribagé =

French tennis player (born 2000)

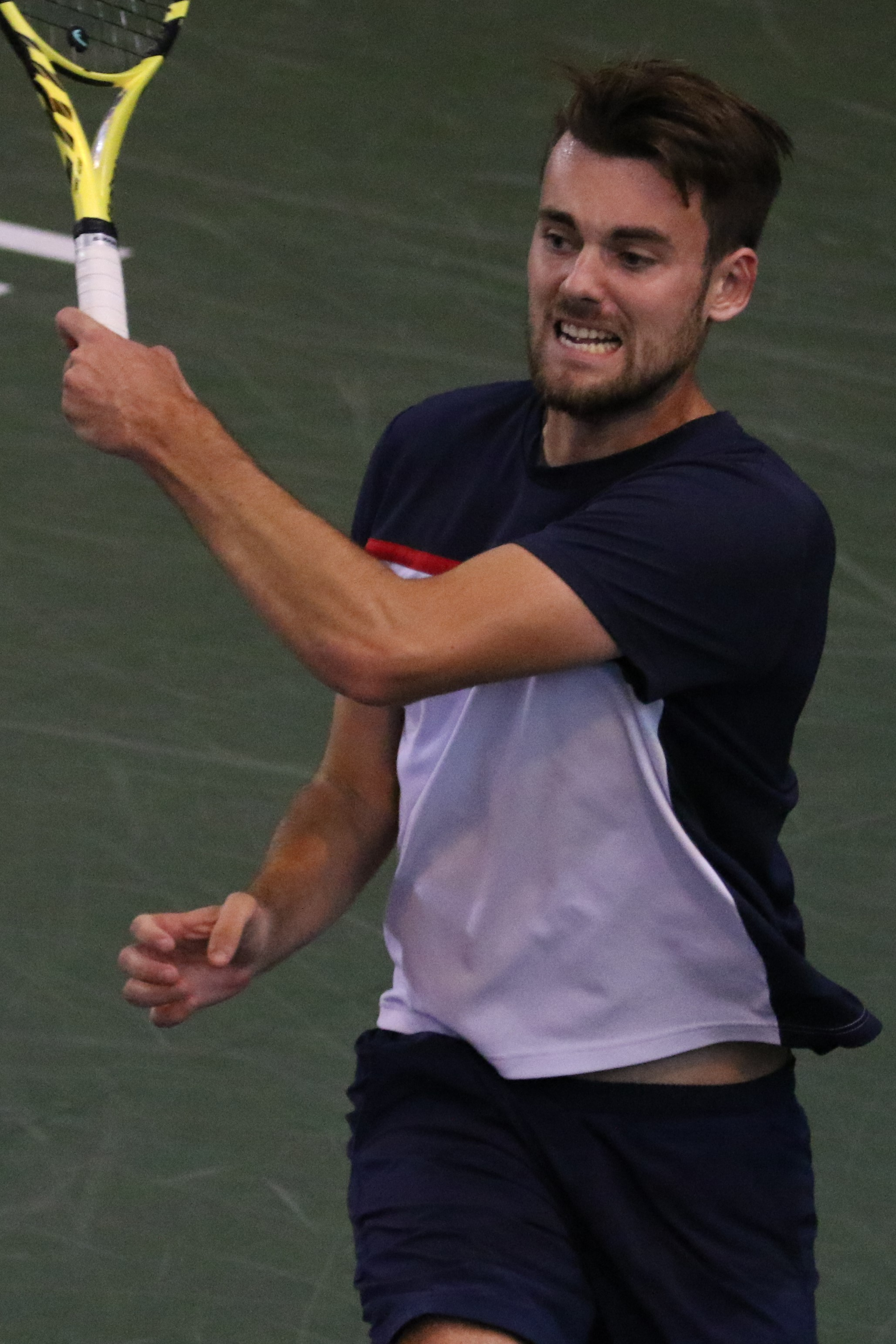
- Arribagé in 2022
- Country (sports): France
- Born: 9 October 2000 (age 26) Rennes, France
- Height: 1.91 m (6 ft 3 in)
- Plays: Left-handed (two-handed backhand)
- Prize money: US $1,217,691

Singles
- Career record: 0–0
- Career titles: 0
- Highest ranking: No. 1,053 (21 November 2022)

Doubles
- Career record: 88–59
- Career titles: 9
- Highest ranking: No. 13 (23 November 2026)
- Current ranking: No. 13 (23 November 2026)

Grand Slam doubles results
- Australian Open: 2R (2026)
- French Open: 2R (2023, 2024, 2025)
- Wimbledon: 2R (2025, 2026)
- US Open: 2R (2026)

Other doubles tournaments
- Tour Finals: W (2026)

Grand Slam mixed doubles results
- French Open: 1R (2026)
- Wimbledon: 1R (2026)
- Last updated on: 22 November 2026.

Théo Arribagé (born 9 October 2000) is a French professional tennis player, who specializes in doubles. He has a career-high ATP doubles ranking of world No. 13 achieved on 23 November 2026. He has won nine ATP Tour titles, including eight with Albano Olivetti.

== Personal life ==
He is the son of former football player and manager Dominique Arribagé and of politician Laurence Arribagé.

== Career ==
=== 2023: ATP Tour debut ===
In February, Arribagé made his ATP main draw debut at the 2023 Open Sud de France after entering the doubles main draw as alternates with Luca Sanchez. In June, Arribagé won his first Grand Slam match at the 2023 French Open, partnering with Luca Sanchez, after receiving a wildcard for the main draw.

=== 2024: Wimbledon debut ===
Arribagé also received a wildcard for the 2024 French Open partnering with Dan Added. Arribagé also made his Wimbledon debut, partnering with Marcus Daniell but lost in the first round to Julian Cash and Robert Galloway.

=== 2025–2026: ATP titles, New partnership, Top 20 ===
In February 2025, Arribagé won his maiden ATP title in Buenos Aires partnering with Guido Andreozzi. The pair defeated Rafael Matos and Marcelo Melo in the final.

With new partner Albano Olivetti, Arribagé won six doubles titles, including the first biggest title of his career, the ATP 500 2026 Dallas Open, defeating top seeds Marcel Granollers and Horacio Zeballos.

== Performance timeline ==
Key
| W | F | SF | QF | #R | RR | Q# | DNQ | A | NH |

(W) winner; (F) finalist; (SF) semifinalist; (QF) quarterfinalist; (#R) rounds 4, 3, 2, 1; (RR) round-robin stage; (Q#) qualification round; (DNQ) did not qualify; (A) absent; (NH) not held; (SR) strike rate (events won / competed); (W–L) win–loss record.

=== Doubles ===
Current through the 2026 Halle Open.

| Tournament | 2023 | 2024 | 2025 | 2026 | SR | W–L | Win% |
|---|---|---|---|---|---|---|---|
Grand Slam tournaments
| Australian Open | A | A | 1R | 2R | 0 / 2 | 1–2 | 33% |
| French Open | 2R | 2R | 2R | 1R | 0 / 4 | 3–4 | 43% |
| Wimbledon | A | 1R | 2R | | 0 / 2 | 0–2 | 0% |
| US Open | A | A | 1R | | 0 / 1 | 0–1 | 0% |
| Win–loss | 1–1 | 1–2 | 2–4 | 1–2 | 0 / 9 | 5–9 | 36% |
ATP Masters 1000
| Indian Wells Open | A | A | A | | 0 / 0 | 0–0 | – |
| Miami Open | A | A | 2R | | 0 / 1 | 1–1 | 50% |
| Monte Carlo Masters | A | A | A | | 0 / 0 | 0–0 | – |
| Madrid Open | A | A | A | | 0 / 0 | 0–0 | – |
| Italian Open | A | A | QF | | 0 / 1 | 3–1 | 75% |
| Canadian Open | A | A | A | | 0 / 0 | 0–0 | – |
| Cincinnati Open | A | A | A | | 0 / 0 | 0–0 | – |
| Shanghai Masters | A | A | A | | 0 / 0 | 0–0 | – |
| Paris Masters | A | A | A | | 0 / 0 | 0–0 | – |
| Win–loss | 0–0 | 0–0 | 3–2 | 0–0 | 0 / 2 | 4–2 | 60% |

== Significant finals ==
=== Year-end championships: 1 (title) ===
| Result | Year | Championship | Surface | Partner | Opponents | Score |
|---|---|---|---|---|---|---|
| Win | 2026 | ATP Finals, Turin | Hard (i) | (France) Albano Olivetti | (El Salvador) Marcelo Arévalo (Croatia) Mate Pavić | 3–6, 7–6^{(7–2)}, [10–6] |

== ATP Tour finals ==
=== Doubles: 13 (9 titles, 4 runner-ups) ===
| Legend Grand Slam (–) ATP Finals (1–0) ATP 1000 (–) ATP 500 (3–2) ATP 250 (5–2) | Finals by surface Hard (6–2) Clay (1–2) Grass (2–0) | Finals by setting Outdoor (4–3) Indoor (5–1) |

| Result | W–L | Date | Tournament | Tier | Surface | Partner | Opponents | Score |
|---|---|---|---|---|---|---|---|---|
| Win | 1–0 | Feb 2025 | Argentina Open, Argentina | ATP 250 | Clay | (Argentina) Guido Andreozzi | (Brazil) Rafael Matos (Brazil) Marcelo Melo | 7–5, 4–6, [10–7] |
| Win | 2–0 | Oct 2025 | Almaty Open, Kazakhstan | ATP 250 | Hard (i) | (France) Albano Olivetti | (Germany) Jakob Schnaitter (Germany) Mark Wallner | 6–4, 7–6^{(10–8)} |
| Win | 3–0 | Jan 2026 | Auckland Open, New Zealand | ATP 250 | Hard | (France) Albano Olivetti | (Austria) Alexander Erler (United States) Robert Galloway | 7–6^{(7–2)}, 6–4 |
| Win | 4–0 | Feb 2026 | Open Occitanie, France | ATP 250 | Hard (i) | (France) Albano Olivetti | (Germany) Constantin Frantzen (Netherlands) Robin Haase | 7–6^{(8–6)}, 6–1 |
| Win | 5–0 | Feb 2026 | Dallas Open, US | ATP 500 | Hard (i) | (France) Albano Olivetti | (Spain) Marcel Granollers (Argentina) Horacio Zeballos | 6–3, 7–6^{(7–4)} |
| Loss | 5–1 | Apr 2026 | Bavarian Championships, Germany | ATP 500 | Clay | (France) Albano Olivetti | (Germany) Jakob Schnaitter (Germany) Mark Wallner | 4–6, 7–6^{(7–4)}, [10–12] |
| Win | 6–1 | Jun 2026 | Halle Open, Germany | ATP 500 | Grass | (France) Albano Olivetti | (Germany) Daniel Altmaier (Brazil) João Fonseca | 7–6^{(7–2)}, 6–4 |
| Win | 7–1 | Jun 2026 | Mallorca Championships, Spain | ATP 250 | Grass | (France) Albano Olivetti | (Sweden) André Göransson (United States) Evan King | 7–6^{(8–6)}, 3–6, [11–9] |
| Loss | 7–2 | Jul 2026 | Swedish Open, Sweden | ATP 250 | Clay | (Portugal) Francisco Cabral | (France) Sadio Doumbia (France) Fabien Reboul | 3–6, 4–6 |
| Loss | 7–3 | Oct 2026 | Japan Open, Japan | ATP 500 | Hard | (France) Albano Olivetti | (United States) Austin Krajicek (Croatia) Nikola Mektić | 6–7^{(5–7)}, 7–5, [6–10] |
| Loss | 7–4 | Oct 2026 | ATP Lyon Open, France | ATP 250 | Hard (i) | (France) Albano Olivetti | (United Kingdom) Julian Cash (United Kingdom) Lloyd Glasspool | 6–4, 3–6, [8–10] |
| Win | 8–4 | Nov 2026 | Swiss Indoors, Switzerland | ATP 500 | Hard (i) | (France) Albano Olivetti | (Switzerland) Henry Bernet (Switzerland) Dominic Stricker | 7–6^{(8–6)}, 7–6^{(8–6)} |
| Win | 9–4 | Nov 2026 | ATP Finals, Italy | Tour Finals | Hard (i) | (France) Albano Olivetti | (El Salvador) Marcelo Arévalo (Croatia) Mate Pavić | 3–6, 7–6^{(7–2)}, [10–6] |
