= 2023 Schwaben Open =

- Date: 21–26 August
- Edition: 2nd
- Location: Augsburg, Germany

Champions

Singles
- (Spain) Carlos Taberner

Doubles
- (Germany) Constantin Frantzen / (Germany) Hendrik Jebens
- Schwaben Open

The 2023 Schwaben Open was a professional tennis tournament played on clay courts. It was the 2nd edition of the tournament which was part of the 2023 ATP Challenger Tour. It took place in Augsburg, Germany between 21 and 26 August 2023.

== Singles main-draw entrants ==
=== Seeds ===
Country	Player	Rank^{1}	Seed
ARG	Hernán Casanova	242	1
LIB	Benjamin Hassan	244	2
ARG	Román Andrés Burruchaga	254	3
CAN	Steven Diez	255	4
FRA	Manuel Guinard	259	5
ARG	Santiago Rodríguez Taverna	269	6
GER	Timo Stodder	274	7
ESP	Nikolás Sánchez Izquierdo	279	8

- ^{1} Rankings are as of 14 August 2023.

=== Other entrants ===
The following players received wildcards into the singles main draw:

- (Germany) Marvin Möller
- (Germany) ~~Max Hans Rehberg~~
- (Germany) Marko Topo

The following players received entry from the qualifying draw:

- (Italy) Gianmarco Ferrari
- (Lebanon) Hady Habib
- (Germany) Daniel Masur
- (Germany) Christoph Negritu
- (Austria) David Pichler
- (Brazil) Nicolas Zanellato

The following player received entry as a lucky loser:

- (Portugal) Henrique Rocha

== Champions ==
=== Singles ===
- (Spain) Carlos Taberner def. (Spain) Oriol Roca Batalla 6–4, 6–4.

=== Doubles ===
- (Germany) Constantin Frantzen / (Germany) Hendrik Jebens def. (France) Constantin Bittoun Kouzmine / (Ukraine) Volodymyr Uzhylovskyi 6–2, 6–2.
