= Filip Duda =

Czech tennis player (born 1998)

- Country (sports): Czech Republic
- Born: 30 September 1998 (age 28) Ostrov, Czech Republic
- Height: 1.83 m (6 ft 0 in)
- Plays: Right-handed (two-handed backhand)
- Prize money: US $96,416

Singles
- Career record: 0–0 (at ATP Tour level, Grand Slam level, and in Davis Cup)
- Career titles: 0
- Highest ranking: No. 743 (17 December 2018)

Doubles
- Career record: 0–0 (at ATP Tour level, Grand Slam level, and in Davis Cup)
- Career titles: 3 Challenger, 14 ITF
- Highest ranking: No. 113 (8 June 2026)
- Current ranking: No. 113 (8 June 2026)
- Last updated on: 8 June 2026.

Filip Duda (born 30 September 1998) is a Czech tennis player. Duda has a career high ATP singles ranking of No. 743 achieved on 17 December 2018 and a career high ATP doubles ranking of No. 113 achieved on 8 June 2026.

Duda has won his first ATP Challenger doubles title at the 2026 Oeiras Indoors II.

== ATP Challenger Tour finals ==
Result	W–L	Date	Tournament	Category	Surface	Partner	Opponents	Score
Loss	0–1	Jan 2025	Nottingham, United Kingdom	Challenger	Hard (i)	(Czech Republic) Jiří Barnát	(Czech Republic) Jonáš Forejtek (Czech Republic) Michael Vrbenský	6^{5}–7, 6^{5}–7
Loss	0–2	Jun 2025	Bratislava, Slovakia	Challenger	Clay	(Czech Republic) Jiří Barnát	(Czech Republic) Andrew Paulson (Czech Republic) Matěj Vocel	1–6, 4–6
Loss	0–3	Jul 2025	Liberec, Czechia	Challenger	Clay	(Czech Republic) Jiří Barnát	(Czech Republic) Andrew Paulson (Czech Republic) Michael Vrbenský	4–6, 1–6
Loss	0–4	Aug 2025	Augsburg, Germany	Challenger	Clay	(Czech Republic) Jiří Barnát	(Germany) Daniel Masur (Germany) Benito Sanchez Martinez	6^{2}–7, 2–6
Loss	0–5	Sep 2025	Bad Waltersdorf, Austria	Challenger	Clay	(Czech Republic) Jiří Barnát	(Austria) David Pichler (Croatia) Nino Serdarušić	3–6, 3–6
Win	1–5	Jan 2026	Oeiras, Portugal	Challenger	Hard (i)	(Czech Republic) Zdeněk Kolář	(Sweden) Erik Grevelius (Sweden) Adam Heinonen	6–3, 6–4
Loss	1–6	Feb 2026	Koblenz, Germany	Challenger	Hard (i)	(Serbia) Stefan Latinović	(Belgium) Tibo Colson (Netherlands) Thijmen Loof	6^{1}–7, 6–3, [6–10]
Win	2–6	Feb 2026	Tenerife, Spain	Challenger	Hard	(Czech Republic) David Poljak	(Croatia) Luka Mikrut (Portugal) Tiago Pereira	7–6^{0}, 6–3
Win	3–6	Mar 2026	Barletta, Italy	Challenger	Clay	(Serbia) Stefan Latinović	(Slovakia) Miloš Karol (Ukraine) Vitaliy Sachko	7–6^{(7–4)}, 6–7^{(6–8)}, [13–11]
Loss	3–7	May 2026	Istanbul, Turkey	Challenger	Clay	(Serbia) Stefan Latinović	(United States) George Goldhoff (United States) Theodore Winegar	5–7, 2–6
Win	4–7	Nov 2026	Monastir, Tunisia	Challenger	Hard	(Portugal) Tiago Pereira	(United Kingdom) James MacKinlay (India) Jeevan Nedunchezhiyan	7–6^{(7–1)}, 7–6^{(7–2)}
