= Jakob Schnaitter =

German tennis player (born 1996)

- Country (sports): Germany
- Born: 7 March 1996 (age 30) Wasserburg am Inn, Germany
- Height: 1.83 m (6 ft 0 in)
- Plays: Right-handed (two-handed backhand)
- College: Azusa Pacific, Wake Forest
- Coach: Marc Meigel, Marco Kirschner
- Prize money: US $598,832

Singles
- Career record: 0–0
- Career titles: 0
- Highest ranking: No. 686 (6 November 2023)

Doubles
- Career record: 43–40
- Career titles: 1
- Highest ranking: No. 31 (3 August 2026)
- Current ranking: No. 31 (3 August 2026)

Grand Slam doubles results
- Australian Open: 2R (2025)
- French Open: 2R (2025, 2026)
- Wimbledon: 2R (2025)
- US Open: 3R (2025, 2026)

Grand Slam mixed doubles results
- French Open: 2R (2026)
- Last updated on: 3 August 2026.

Jakob Schnaitter (born 7 March 1996) is a German tennis player who specializes in doubles. He has a career high ATP doubles ranking of world No. 31 achieved on 3 August 2026 and a singles ranking of No. 686 achieved on 6 November 2023.

== Career ==
Schnaitter played college tennis at Azusa Pacific before playing at Wake Forest as a graduate transfer.

=== 2024-2026: ATP debut, first title ===
Schnaitter made his ATP Tour main-draw debut at the 2024 BMW Open in Munich, where he partnered with Mark Wallner in doubles. He also entered directly into the main-draw in 2024 Hamburg Open with Wallner. After qualifying for the main-draw, Schnaitter combined with Wallner to win his first ATP Tour doubles title at the 2026 BMW Open, defeating Théo Arribagé and Albano Olivetti in the final which went to a deciding champions tiebreak.

== Doubles performance timeline ==
Key
W	F	SF	QF	#R	RR	Q#	DNQ	A	NH

(W) winner; (F) finalist; (SF) semifinalist; (QF) quarterfinalist; (#R) rounds 4, 3, 2, 1; (RR) round-robin stage; (Q#) qualification round; (DNQ) did not qualify; (A) absent; (NH) not held; (SR) strike rate (events won / competed); (W–L) win–loss record.
To avoid confusion and double counting, these charts are updated at the conclusion of a tournament or when the player's participation has ended.

Current through the 2026 Stockholm Open.

Tournament	2024	2025	2026	SR	W–L
Grand Slam tournaments
Australian Open	A	2R	1R	0 / 2	1–2
French Open	A	2R	2R	0 / 2	1–2
Wimbledon	A	2R	1R	0 / 2	1–2
US Open	A	3R	3R	0 / 2	4–2
Win–loss	0–0	5–4	2–4	0 / 8	7–8
ATP 1000 tournaments
Madrid Open	A	A	1R	0 / 1	0–1
Italian Open	A	A	2R	0 / 1	1–1
Canadian Open	A	A	1R	0 / 1	0–1
Cincinnati Open	A	A	2R	0 / 1	1–1
Shanghai Masters	A	QF	SF	0 / 2	4–2
Paris Masters	A	A	1R	0 / 1	0–1
Win–loss	0–0	2–1	4–6	0 / 7	6–7
Career statistics
Tournaments	5	17	30	52	
Titles	0	0	1	1	
Finals	0	2	2	4	
Overall win–loss	4–5	20–17	27–29	51–51	
Year-end ranking	80	45		50%	

== ATP Tour finals ==
=== Doubles: 4 (1 title, 3 runner-ups) ===
Legend Grand Slam (–) ATP 1000 (–) ATP 500 (1–0) ATP 250 (0–3)	Finals by surface Hard (0–1) Clay (1–2) Grass (–)

Result	W–L	Date	Tournament	Tier	Surface	Partner	Opponents	Score
Loss	0–1	Apr 2025	Țiriac Open, Romania	ATP 250	Clay	(Germany) Mark Wallner	(Spain) Marcel Granollers (Argentina) Horacio Zeballos	6–7^{(3–7)}, 4–6
Loss	0–2	Oct 2025	Almaty Open, Kazakhstan	ATP 250	Hard (i)	(Germany) Mark Wallner	(France) Théo Arribagé (France) Albano Olivetti	4–6, 6–7^{(8–10)}
Win	1–2	Apr 2026	Bavarian Championships, Germany	ATP 500	Clay	(Germany) Mark Wallner	(France) Théo Arribagé (France) Albano Olivetti	6–4, 6–7^{(4–7)}, [12–10]
Loss	1–3	Jul 2026	Austrian Open Kitzbühel, Austria	ATP 250	Clay	(Germany) Mark Wallner	(Austria) Lucas Miedler (Australia) Marc Polmans	2–6, 2–6

== ATP Challenger finals ==
=== Doubles: 15 (6 titles, 9 runner-ups) ===
Finals by surface
Hard (2–2)
Clay (4–7)

Result	W–L	Date	Tournament	Surface	Partner	Opponents	Score
Loss	0–1	Aug 2023	Lüdenscheid, Germany	Clay	(Germany) Kai Wehnelt	(Switzerland) Luca Margaroli (Argentina) Santiago Rodríguez Taverna	6–7^{(4–7)}, 4–6
Loss	0–2	Jan 2024	Buenos Aires, Argentina	Clay	(Germany) Mark Wallner	(Brazil) João Fonseca (Brazil) Pedro Sakamoto	2–6, 2–6
Loss	0–3	Feb 2024	Koblenz, Germany	Hard (i)	(Germany) Mark Wallner	(Netherlands) Sander Arends (Netherlands) Sem Verbeek	4–6, 2–6
Loss	0–4	Mar 2024	New Delhi, India	Hard	(Germany) Mark Wallner	(Poland) Piotr Matuszewski (Australia) Matthew Romios	4–6, 4–6
Loss	0–5	Apr 2024	Barcelona, Spain	Clay	(Germany) Mark Wallner	(Spain) Daniel Rincón (Spain) Oriol Roca Batalla	7–5, 4–6, [9–11]
Loss	0–6	Apr 2024	Ostrava, Czech Republic	Clay	(Germany) Mark Wallner	(Portugal) Jaime Faria (Portugal) Henrique Rocha	5–7, 3–6
Win	1–6	May 2024	Prague, Czech Republic	Clay	(Germany) Mark Wallner	(Czech Republic) Jiří Barnat (Czech Republic) Jan Hrazdil	6–3, 6–1
Win	2–6	May 2024	Augsburg, Germany	Clay	(Germany) Mark Wallner	(Austria) David Pichler (Czech Republic) Michael Vrbenský	3–6, 6–2, [10–8]
Loss	2–7	Jun 2024	Heilbronn, Germany	Clay	(Germany) Mark Wallner	(Monaco) Romain Arneodo (France) Geoffrey Blancaneaux	6–7^{(5–7)}, 7–5, [3–10]
Win	3–7	Jun 2024	Bratislava, Slovakia	Clay	(Germany) Mark Wallner	(Slovakia) Miloš Karol (Slovakia) Tomáš Lánik	6–4, 6–4
Loss	3–8	Jun 2024	Poznań, Poland	Clay	(Germany) Mark Wallner	(Brazil) Orlando Luz (Brazil) Marcelo Zormann	7–5, 2–6, [6–10]
Win	4–8	Jul 2024	Karlsruhe, Germany	Clay	(Germany) Mark Wallner	(France) Dan Added (France) Grégoire Jacq	6–4, 6–0
Win	5–8	Feb 2025	Pau, France	Hard (i)	(Germany) Mark Wallner	(Belgium) Alexander Blockx (Belgium) Raphaël Collignon	6–4, 6–7^{(5–7)}, [10–8]
Loss	5–9	Jun 2025	Heilbronn, Germany	Clay	(Germany) Mark Wallner	(United States) Vasil Kirkov (Netherlands) Bart Stevens	6–7^{(5–7)}, 6–4, [7–10]
Win	6–9	Nov 2025	Helsinki, Finland	Hard (i)	(Germany) Mark Wallner	(Romania) Alexandru Jecan (Romania) Bogdan Pavel	6–2, 4–6, [10–6]

== ITF World Tennis Tour finals ==
=== Singles: 2 (1–1) ===
Result	W–L	Date	Tournament	Surface	Opponent	Score
Loss	0–1	Aug 2023	M15 Frankfurt, Germany	Clay	(Germany) Lucas Gerch	4–6, 1–6
Win	1–1	Aug 2023	M15 Überlingen, Germany	Clay	(Germany) Max Hans Rehberg	6–7^{(2–7)}, 6–1, 6–2

=== Doubles: 19 (10–9) ===
Result	W–L	Date	Tournament	Surface	Partner	Opponents	Score
Loss	0–1	Oct 2022	M15 Ithaca, United States	Hard (i)	(Cyprus) Menelaos Efstathiou	(United States) John McNally (Japan) Shunsuke Mitsui	3–6, 4–6
Loss	0–2	Feb 2023	M15 Oberhaching, Germany	Hard (i)	(Germany) Johannes Härteis	(United Kingdom) Joshua Goodger (United Kingdom) Joe Tyler	6–7^{(4–7)}, 6–1, [7–10]
Loss	0–3	Mar 2023	M15 Sharm El Sheikh, Egypt	Hard	(Luxembourg) Alex Knaff	(Slovakia) Lukáš Pokorný (Georgia (country)) Saba Purtseladze	3–6, 4–6
Loss	0–4	Mar 2023	M15 Sharm El Sheikh, Egypt	Hard	(Germany) Luca Wiedenmann	(Italy) Federico Bondioli (Italy) Gabriele Bosio	5–7, 6–3, [7–10]
Loss	0–5	Mar 2023	M15 Sharm El Sheikh, Egypt	Hard	(Luxembourg) Alex Knaff	(South Africa) Alec Beckley (Bulgaria) Petr Nesterov	6–3, 3–6, [8–10]
Win	1–5	Apr 2023	M15 Lons-le-Saunier, France	Hard (i)	(Germany) Florian Broska	(Switzerland) Yannik Steinegger (Switzerland) Luca Castelnuovo	6–4, 4–6, [10–3]
Win	2–5	Apr 2023	M15 Monastir, Tunisia	Hard	(Germany) Mark Wallner	(Japan) Kokoro Isomura (Japan) Yamato Sueoka	6–3, 6–2
Win	3–5	Apr 2023	M15 Monastir, Tunisia	Hard	(Switzerland) Yannik Steinegger	Nikita Ianin (Tunisia) Aziz Ouakaa	w/o
Win	4–5	May 2023	M15 Monastir, Tunisia	Hard	(Tunisia) Skander Mansouri	(Japan) Kokoro Isomura (Japan) Yamato Sueoka	6–2, 6–0
Win	5–5	Jun 2023	M15 Nyíregyháza, Hungary	Clay	(Germany) Kai Wehnelt	(Sweden) Dragoș Nicolae Mădăraș (Romania) Călin Manda	w/o
Win	6–5	Jul 2023	M25 Telfs, Austria	Clay	(Germany) Mark Wallner	(Slovakia) Miloš Karol (Austria) Sandro Kopp	6–4, 6–7^{(7–9)}, [10–5]
Loss	6–6	Aug 2023	M15 Frankfurt, Germany	Clay	(Germany) Mark Wallner	(Germany) Johannes Härteis (Germany) Niklas Schell	6–3, 6–7^{(1–7)}, [8–10]
Loss	6–7	Aug 2023	M15 Überlingen, Germany	Clay	(Germany) Mark Wallner	(Germany) Taym Al Azmeh (Syria) Hazem Naw	5–7, 6–3, [7–10]
Win	7–7	Sep 2023	M15 Oberhausen, Germany	Clay	(Germany) Adrian Oetzbach	(Germany) Justin Engel (Germany) Yannik Kelm	7–5, 6–4
Loss	7–8	Sep 2023	M15 Danderyd, Sweden	Hard (i)	(Netherlands) Daniel de Jonge	(Germany) Adrian Oetzbach (Germany) Mats Rosenkranz	0–6, 3–6
Win	8–8	Oct 2023	M25 Nevers, France	Hard (i)	(Germany) Mark Wallner	(Switzerland) Jakub Paul (Switzerland) Yannik Steinegger	6–3, 6–4
Win	9–8	Oct 2023	M25 Sarreguemines, France	Carpet (i)	(Germany) Mark Wallner	(Germany) Jannik Opitz (Germany) Patrick Zahraj	6–3, 5–7, [10–8]
Win	10–8	Nov 2023	M15 Monastir, Tunisia	Hard	(Switzerland) Jakub Paul	(Peru) Alexander Merino (Germany) Christoph Negritu	7–6^{(7–5)}, 7–5
Loss	10–9	Nov 2023	M25 Monastir, Tunisia	Hard	(Germany) Mark Wallner	(Germany) Daniel Masur (Italy) Julian Ocleppo	6–0, 5–7, [3–10]
