= Mark Wallner =

German tennis player (born 1999)

- Country (sports): Germany
- Born: 20 July 1999 (age 27) Munich, Germany
- Height: 1.98 m (6 ft 6 in)
- Plays: Right-handed (two-handed backhand)
- College: Temple, Tennessee
- Coach: Marc Meigel, Marco Kirschner
- Prize money: US $583,169

Singles
- Career record: 0–0
- Career titles: 0
- Highest ranking: No. 1,095 (1 April 2024)

Doubles
- Career record: 43–40
- Career titles: 1
- Highest ranking: No. 31 (3 August 2026)
- Current ranking: No. 31 (3 August 2026)

Grand Slam doubles results
- Australian Open: 2R (2025)
- French Open: 2R (2025, 2026)
- Wimbledon: 2R (2025)
- US Open: 3R (2025, 2026)

Grand Slam mixed doubles results
- French Open: 2R (2026)
- Last updated on: 3 August 2026.

Mark Wallner (born 20 July 1999) is a German tennis player who specializes in doubles. He has a career high ATP doubles ranking of world No. 31 achieved on 3 August 2026.

== Career ==
Wallner played college tennis at Temple University before transferring to Tennessee.

=== 2024-2026: ATP debut, first title ===
Wallner made his ATP Tour main-draw debut at the 2024 BMW Open in Munich, where he partnered with Jakob Schnaitter in doubles. He also entered directly into the main-draw in 2024 Hamburg Open with Schnaitter. After qualifying for the main-draw, Wallner combined with Schnaitter to win his first ATP Tour doubles title at the 2026 BMW Open, defeating Théo Arribagé and Albano Olivetti in the final which went to a deciding champions tiebreak.

== Doubles performance timeline ==
Key
W	F	SF	QF	#R	RR	Q#	DNQ	A	NH

(W) winner; (F) finalist; (SF) semifinalist; (QF) quarterfinalist; (#R) rounds 4, 3, 2, 1; (RR) round-robin stage; (Q#) qualification round; (DNQ) did not qualify; (A) absent; (NH) not held; (SR) strike rate (events won / competed); (W–L) win–loss record.
To avoid confusion and double counting, these charts are updated at the conclusion of a tournament or when the player's participation has ended.

Current through the 2026 Stockholm Open.

Tournament	2024	2025	2026	SR	W–L
Grand Slam tournaments
Australian Open	A	2R	1R	0 / 2	1–2
French Open	A	2R	2R	0 / 2	1–2
Wimbledon	A	2R	1R	0 / 2	1–2
US Open	A	3R	3R	0 / 2	4–2
Win–loss	0–0	5–4	2–4	0 / 8	7–8
ATP 1000 tournaments
Madrid Open	A	A	1R	0 / 1	0–1
Italian Open	A	A	2R	0 / 1	1–1
Canadian Open	A	A	1R	0 / 1	0–1
Cincinnati Open	A	A	2R	0 / 1	1–1
Shanghai Masters	A	QF	SF	0 / 2	4–2
Paris Masters	A	A	1R	0 / 1	0–1
Win–loss	0–0	2–1	4–6	0 / 7	6–7
Career statistics
Tournaments	5	17	30	52	
Titles	0	0	1	1	
Finals	0	2	2	4	
Overall win–loss	4–5	20–17	27–29	51–51	
Year-end ranking	80	45		50%	

== ATP Tour finals ==
=== Doubles: 4 (1 title, 3 runner-ups) ===
Legend Grand Slam (–) ATP 1000 (–) ATP 500 (1–0) ATP 250 (0–3)	Finals by surface Hard (0–1) Clay (1–2) Grass (–)

Result	W–L	Date	Tournament	Tier	Surface	Partner	Opponents	Score
Loss	0–1	Apr 2025	Țiriac Open, Romania	ATP 250	Clay	(Germany) Jakob Schnaitter	(Spain) Marcel Granollers (Argentina) Horacio Zeballos	6–7^{(3–7)}, 4–6
Loss	0–2	Oct 2025	Almaty Open, Kazakhstan	ATP 250	Hard (i)	(Germany) Jakob Schnaitter	(France) Théo Arribagé (France) Albano Olivetti	4–6, 6–7^{(8–10)}
Win	1–2	Apr 2026	Bavarian Championships, Germany	ATP 500	Clay	(Germany) Jakob Schnaitter	(France) Théo Arribagé (France) Albano Olivetti	6–4, 6–7^{(4–7)}, [12–10]
Loss	1–3	Jul 2026	Austrian Open Kitzbühel, Austria	ATP 250	Clay	(Germany) Jakob Schnaitter	(Austria) Lucas Miedler (Australia) Marc Polmans	2–6, 2–6

== ATP Challenger finals ==
=== Doubles: 14 (6 titles, 8 runner-ups) ===
Finals by surface
Hard (2–2)
Clay (4–6)

Result	W–L	Date	Tournament	Surface	Partner	Opponents	Score
Loss	0–1	Jan 2024	Buenos Aires, Argentina	Clay	(Germany) Jakob Schnaitter	(Brazil) João Fonseca (Brazil) Pedro Sakamoto	2–6, 2–6
Loss	0–2	Feb 2024	Koblenz, Germany	Hard (i)	(Germany) Jakob Schnaitter	(Netherlands) Sander Arends (Netherlands) Sem Verbeek	4–6, 2–6
Loss	0–3	Mar 2024	New Delhi, India	Hard	(Germany) Jakob Schnaitter	(Poland) Piotr Matuszewski (Australia) Matthew Romios	4–6, 4–6
Loss	0–4	Apr 2024	Barcelona, Spain	Clay	(Germany) Jakob Schnaitter	(Spain) Daniel Rincón (Spain) Oriol Roca Batalla	7–5, 4–6, [9–11]
Loss	0–5	Apr 2024	Ostrava, Czech Republic	Clay	(Germany) Jakob Schnaitter	(Portugal) Jaime Faria (Portugal) Henrique Rocha	5–7, 3–6
Win	1–5	May 2024	Prague, Czech Republic	Clay	(Germany) Jakob Schnaitter	(Czech Republic) Jiří Barnat (Czech Republic) Jan Hrazdil	6–3, 6–1
Win	2–5	May 2024	Augsburg, Germany	Clay	(Germany) Jakob Schnaitter	(Austria) David Pichler (Czech Republic) Michael Vrbenský	3–6, 6–2, [10–8]
Loss	2–6	Jun 2024	Heilbronn, Germany	Clay	(Germany) Jakob Schnaitter	(Monaco) Romain Arneodo (France) Geoffrey Blancaneaux	6–7^{(5–7)}, 7–5, [3–10]
Win	3–6	Jun 2024	Bratislava, Slovakia	Clay	(Germany) Jakob Schnaitter	(Slovakia) Miloš Karol (Slovakia) Tomáš Lánik	6–4, 6–4
Loss	3–7	Jun 2024	Poznań, Poland	Clay	(Germany) Jakob Schnaitter	(Brazil) Orlando Luz (Brazil) Marcelo Zormann	7–5, 2–6, [6–10]
Win	4–7	Jul 2024	Karlsruhe, Germany	Clay	(Germany) Jakob Schnaitter	(France) Dan Added (France) Grégoire Jacq	6–4, 6–0
Win	5–7	Feb 2025	Pau, France	Hard (i)	(Germany) Jakob Schnaitter	(Belgium) Alexander Blockx (Belgium) Raphaël Collignon	6–4, 6–7^{(5–7)}, [10–8]
Loss	5–8	Jun 2025	Heilbronn, Germany	Clay	(Germany) Jakob Schnaitter	(United States) Vasil Kirkov (Netherlands) Bart Stevens	6–7^{(5–7)}, 6–4, [7–10]
Win	6–8	Nov 2025	Helsinki, Finland	Hard (i)	(Germany) Jakob Schnaitter	(Romania) Alexandru Jecan (Romania) Bogdan Pavel	6–2, 4–6, [10–6]

== ITF World Tennis Tour finals ==
=== Doubles: 11 (7–4) ===
Result	W–L	Date	Tournament	Surface	Partner	Opponents	Score
Loss	0–1	Apr 2023	M15 Monastir, Tunisia	Hard	(Germany) Luca Wiedenmann	(France) Constantin Bittoun Kouzmine (France) Axel Garcian	2–6, 1–6
Win	1–1	Apr 2023	M15 Monastir, Tunisia	Hard	(Germany) Jakob Schnaitter	(Japan) Kokoro Isomura (Japan) Yamato Sueoka	6–3, 6–2
Win	2–1	Jul 2023	M25 Telfs, Austria	Clay	(Germany) Jakob Schnaitter	(Slovakia) Miloš Karol (Austria) Sandro Kopp	6–4, 6–7^{(7–9)}, [10–5]
Win	3–1	Jul 2023	M25 Bolzano, Italy	Clay	(Germany) Jeremy Jahn	(Argentina) Alex Barrena (Argentina) Juan Bautista Otegui	7–6^{(13–11)}, 6–0
Loss	3–2	Aug 2023	M15 Frankfurt, Germany	Clay	(Germany) Jakob Schnaitter	(Germany) Johannes Härteis (Germany) Niklas Schell	6–3, 6–7^{(1–7)}, [8–10]
Loss	3–3	Aug 2023	M15 Überlingen, Germany	Clay	(Germany) Jakob Schnaitter	(Germany) Taym Al Azmeh (Syria) Hazem Naw	5–7, 6–3, [7–10]
Win	4–3	Sep 2023	M25 Bagnères-de-Bigorre, France	Hard	(Australia) Patrick Harper	(France) Robin Bertrand (United Kingdom) Millen Hurrion	3–6, 6–3, [10–7]
Win	5–3	Sep 2023	M25 Plaisir, France	Hard (i)	(Australia) Patrick Harper	(United States) Jack Vance (United States) Tennyson Whiting	6–4, 7–6^{(7–3)}
Win	6–3	Oct 2023	M25 Nevers, France	Hard (i)	(Germany) Jakob Schnaitter	(Switzerland) Jakub Paul (Switzerland) Yannik Steinegger	6–3, 6–4
Win	7–3	Oct 2023	M25 Sarreguemines, France	Carpet (i)	(Germany) Jakob Schnaitter	(Germany) Jannik Opitz (Germany) Patrick Zahraj	6–3, 5–7, [10–8]
Loss	7–4	Nov 2023	M25 Monastir, Tunisia	Hard	(Germany) Jakob Schnaitter	(Germany) Daniel Masur (Italy) Julian Ocleppo	6–0, 5–7, [3–10]
