= Schwaben Open =

- 2024 Schwaben Open

ATP Challenger Tour
- Event name: Schwaben Open by Great2Stay
- Location: Augsburg, Germany
- Venue: TC Augsburg Siebentisch
- Category: ATP Challenger Tour
- Surface: Clay
- Draw: 48S/4Q/16D
- Prize money: €36,900
- Website: website

The Schwaben Open by Great2Stay is a professional tennis tournament played on clay courts. It is currently part of the ATP Challenger Tour. It is held annually in Augsburg, Germany since 2019, replacing the IsarOpen.

== Past finals ==
=== Singles ===
Year	Champion	Runner-up	Score
2026	(Romania) Cezar Crețu	(Argentina) Facundo Mena	6–2, 6–0
2025	(Germany) Cedrik-Marcel Stebe	(Switzerland) Alexander Ritschard	6–3, 6–3
2024	(Kazakhstan) Timofey Skatov	(Denmark) Elmer Møller	3–6, 7–5, 6–3
2023	(Spain) Carlos Taberner	(Spain) Oriol Roca Batalla	6–4, 6–4
2020–22	Not held		
2019	(Germany) Yannick Hanfmann	(Finland) Emil Ruusuvuori	2–6, 6–4, 7–5

=== Doubles ===
Year	Champions	Runners-up	Score
2026	(Czech Republic) Dominik Reček (Czech Republic) Daniel Siniakov	(Argentina) Juan Manuel La Serna (Brazil) Eduardo Ribeiro	6–2, 6–3
2025	(Germany) Daniel Masur (Germany) Benito Sanchez Martinez	(Czech Republic) Jiří Barnat (Czech Republic) Filip Duda	7–6^{(7–2)}, 6–2
2024	(Germany) Jakob Schnaitter (Germany) Mark Wallner	(Austria) David Pichler (Czech Republic) Michael Vrbenský	3–6, 6–2, [10–8]
2023	(Germany) Constantin Frantzen (Germany) Hendrik Jebens	(France) Constantin Bittoun Kouzmine (Ukraine) Volodymyr Uzhylovskyi	6–2, 6–2
2020–22	Not held		
2019	(Belarus) Andrei Vasilevski (Slovakia) Igor Zelenay	(Croatia) Ivan Sabanov (Croatia) Matej Sabanov	4–6, 6–4, [10–3]
