= 2026 Internationaux de Tennis de Troyes – Doubles =

Doubles
- 2026 Internationaux de Tennis de Troyes

Final
- Champions: (Netherlands) Mats Hermans (Brazil) Igor Marcondes
- Runners-up: (Bulgaria) Anthony Genov (Germany) Kai Wehnelt
- Score: 6–3, 3–6, [10–7]

Events
Singles	Doubles
- Internationaux de Tennis de Troyes

Mario Mansilla Díez and Bruno Pujol Navarro were the defending champions but chose not to defend their title.

Mats Hermans and Igor Marcondes won the title after defeating Anthony Genov and Kai Wehnelt 6–3, 3–6, [10–7] in the final.

== Seeds ==
1. (United Kingdom) Finn Bass / (United Kingdom) James MacKinlay (quarterfinals)
2. (Peru) Alexander Merino / (Argentina) Franco Ribero (semifinals)
3. (Bulgaria) Anthony Genov / (Germany) Kai Wehnelt (final)
4. (Netherlands) Mats Hermans / (Brazil) Igor Marcondes (champions)

== Draw ==
Key

- Q = Qualifier
- WC = Wild card
- LL = Lucky loser
- Alt = Alternate
- ITF = ITF entry
- PR = Protected ranking
- SR = Special ranking
- SE = Special exempt
- JE = Junior exempt
- JR = Junior Accelerator Programme entrant
- CO = College Accelerator Programme entrant
- NG = Next Gen Accelerator Program entrant
- w/o = Walkover
- r = Retired
- d = Defaulted

First round
1	(United Kingdom) F Bass (United Kingdom) J MacKinlay	6	6
WC	(France) Lancelot Erler (France) Oscar Erler	0	1
(Chinese Taipei) J Hsu (United States) Michael Zhu	6	6
(Switzerland) K Feldbausch (France) Cosme Rolland de Ravel	3	3
4	(Netherlands) M Hermans (Brazil) I Marcondes	6	6
(New Zealand) I Becroft (Australia) Je Delaney	3	3
(France) G Blancaneaux (France) Yanis Ghazouani Durand	6	6
(Chinese Taipei) T-h Huang (China) B Zheng	3	4
(Japan) Yamato Sueoka (Japan) N Tajima	6	6
(Tunisia) Adam Nagoudi (France) Victor Paganetti	4	4
(United States) Zachary Fuchs (United States) Wally Thayne	4	3
3	(Bulgaria) A Genov (Germany) K Wehnelt	6	6
WC	(France) Julien Evrard (Spain) Abel Hernández Aguila	1	0
(India) M Dhamne (Poland) Piotr Pawlak	6	6
(Switzerland) Luca Stäheli (Germany) P Zahraj	4	6^{3}
2	(Peru) A Merino (Argentina) F Ribero	6	7^{7}

Quarterfinals
1	(United Kingdom) F Bass (United Kingdom) J MacKinlay	6	2	[6]
(Chinese Taipei) J Hsu (United States) M Zhu	1	6	[10]
4	(Netherlands) M Hermans (Brazil) I Marcondes	6	6
(France) G Blancaneaux (France) Y Ghazouani Durand	0	4
(Japan) Y Sueoka (Japan) N Tajima	2	2
3	(Bulgaria) A Genov (Germany) K Wehnelt	6	6
(India) M Dhamne (Poland) P Pawlak	6	2	[6]
2	(Peru) A Merino (Argentina) F Ribero	4	6	[10]

Semifinals
(Chinese Taipei) J Hsu (United States) M Zhu	3	2
4	(Netherlands) M Hermans (Brazil) I Marcondes	6	6
3	(Bulgaria) A Genov (Germany) K Wehnelt	6^{5}	6	[10]
2	(Peru) A Merino (Argentina) F Ribero	7^{7}	4	[8]

Final
4	(Netherlands) M Hermans (Brazil) I Marcondes	6	3	[10]
3	(Bulgaria) A Genov (Germany) K Wehnelt	3	6	[7]
