= 2024 Internationaux de Tennis de Troyes – Doubles =

Doubles
- 2024 Internationaux de Tennis de Troyes

Final
- Champions: (Austria) Neil Oberleitner (Switzerland) Jakub Paul
- Runners-up: (Uzbekistan) Denis Istomin; Evgeny Karlovskiy
- Score: 6–4, 7–6^{(7–1)}

Events
| Singles | Doubles |
- Internationaux de Tennis de Troyes

Manuel Guinard and Grégoire Jacq were the defending champions but chose not to defend their title.

Neil Oberleitner and Jakub Paul won the title after defeating Denis Istomin and Evgeny Karlovskiy 6–4, 7–6^{(7–1)} in the final.

== Seeds ==
1. (Austria) Neil Oberleitner / (Switzerland) Jakub Paul (champions)
2. (France) Constantin Bittoun Kouzmine / (Ukraine) Volodymyr Uzhylovskyi (quarterfinals)
3. (France) Corentin Denolly / (Switzerland) Damien Wenger (first round)
4. (France) Gabriel Debru / (France) Luca Sanchez (first round)

== Draw ==
Key

- Q = Qualifier
- WC = Wild card
- LL = Lucky loser
- Alt = Alternate
- ITF = ITF entry
- PR = Protected ranking
- SR = Special ranking
- SE = Special exempt
- JE = Junior exempt
- JR = Junior Accelerator Programme entrant
- CO = College Accelerator Programme entrant
- NG = Next Gen Accelerator Program entrant
- w/o = Walkover
- r = Retired
- d = Defaulted

=== Draw ===
First round
1 | (Austria) N Oberleitner (Switzerland) J Paul | 6 | 6
PR | (Croatia) Z Babić (Syria) H Naw | 1 | 3
(Brazil) Gabriel Roveri Sidney (Brazil) PA Saraiva dos Santos | 6 | 6
WC | (France) Hugo Chapoutot (France) Lancelot Erler | 2 | 2
4 | (France) G Debru (France) L Sanchez | 2 | 7 | [10]
(Bulgaria) A Genov (Spain) B Pujol Navarro | 6 | 5 | [12]
(Switzerland) L Castelnuovo (Ukraine) Vadym Ursu | 7^{7} | 2 | [7]
(Germany) S Fanselow (Belgium) M Geerts | 6^{5} | 6 | [10]
WC | (France) Julien Evrard (Spain) Abel Hernández Aguila | 2 | 2
(Spain) Carlos López Montagud (Spain) C Taberner | 6 | 6
(Zimbabwe) CJ Lock; M Sharipov | 7^{7} | 6
3 | (France) C Denolly (Switzerland) D Wenger | 6^{3} | 4
(Uzbekistan) D Istomin; E Karlovskiy | 4 | 6 | [10]
Alt | (France) Maxence Beaugé (France) Lucas Bouquet | 6 | 2 | [8]
PR | (Serbia) N Milojević (Uzbekistan) K Sultanov | 3 | 3
2 | (France) C Bittoun Kouzmine (Ukraine) V Uzhylovskyi | 6 | 6

Quarterfinals
1 | (Austria) N Oberleitner (Switzerland) J Paul | 1 | 6 | [13]
(Brazil) G Roveri Sidney (Brazil) PA Saraiva dos Santos | 6 | 3 | [11]
(Bulgaria) A Genov (Spain) B Pujol Navarro | 2 | 6 | [10]
(Germany) S Fanselow (Belgium) M Geerts | 6 | 4 | [5]
(Spain) C López Montagud (Spain) C Taberner
(Zimbabwe) CJ Lock; M Sharipov | w/o
(Uzbekistan) D Istomin; E Karlovskiy | 7 | 2 | [10]
2 | (France) C Bittoun Kouzmine (Ukraine) V Uzhylovskyi | 5 | 6 | [1]

Semifinals
1 | (Austria) N Oberleitner (Switzerland) J Paul | 6 | 6
(Bulgaria) A Genov (Spain) B Pujol Navarro | 2 | 2
(Zimbabwe) CJ Lock; M Sharipov | 5 | 2
(Uzbekistan) D Istomin; E Karlovskiy | 7 | 6

Final
1 | (Austria) N Oberleitner (Switzerland) J Paul | 6 | 7^{7}
(Uzbekistan) D Istomin; E Karlovskiy | 4 | 6^{1}
