= 2022 Internationaux de Tennis de Troyes – Doubles =

Doubles
- 2022 Internationaux de Tennis de Troyes

Final
- Champions: (Spain) Íñigo Cervantes (Spain) Oriol Roca Batalla
- Runners-up: (Argentina) Thiago Agustín Tirante (Argentina) Juan Bautista Torres
- Score: 6–1, 6–2

Events
| Singles | Doubles |
| Internationaux de Tennis de Troyes | · 2023 → |

This was the first edition of the tournament. It was originally supposed to be held in 2020 but was canceled due to the COVID-19 pandemic.

Íñigo Cervantes and Oriol Roca Batalla won the title after defeating Thiago Agustín Tirante and Juan Bautista Torres 6–1, 6–2 in the final.

== Seeds ==
1. (Argentina) Hernán Casanova / (Argentina) Genaro Alberto Olivieri (first round)
2. (France) Théo Arribagé / (France) Luca Sanchez (semifinals)
3. (Argentina) Thiago Agustín Tirante / (Argentina) Juan Bautista Torres (final)
4. (Spain) Íñigo Cervantes / (Spain) Oriol Roca Batalla (champions)

== Draw ==
=== Key ===
- Q = Qualifier
- WC = Wild card
- LL = Lucky loser
- Alt = Alternate
- SE = Special exempt
- PR = Protected ranking
- ITF = ITF entry
- JE = Junior exempt
- w/o = Walkover
- r = Retired
- d = Defaulted
- SR = Special ranking

First round
1 | (Argentina) H Casanova (Argentina) GA Olivieri | 3 | 5
(Germany) S Fanselow (South Africa) R Roelofse | 6 | 7
(Brazil) P Boscardin Dias (Brazil) Oscar José Gutierrez | 3 | 0
(France) M Martineau (Switzerland) J Paul | 6 | 6
4 | (Spain) Í Cervantes (Spain) O Roca Batalla | 6 | 6
WC | (France) Augustin Damonte (France) Stanislas de Samucewicz | 2 | 0
(Bulgaria) P Milushev (Bulgaria) R Shandarov | 4 | 3
(Romania) A Jecan (Romania) FC Jianu | 6 | 6
Andrey Chepelev (Kazakhstan) T Skatov | 6 | 6
(Croatia) Z Babić (Zimbabwe) CJ Lock | 3 | 4
WC | (France) Julien Evrard (Spain) Abel Hernández Aguila | 2 | 0
3 | (Argentina) TA Tirante (Argentina) JB Torres | 6 | 6
(France) A Fils (France) L Van Assche | 4 | 5
(France) A Reymond (France) C Tabur | 6 | 7
(Italy) R Brancaccio (Switzerland) J Nikles | 1 | 6 | [7]
2 | (France) T Arribagé (France) L Sanchez | 6 | 3 | [10]

Quarterfinals
(Germany) S Fanselow (South Africa) R Roelofse | 2 | 5
(France) M Martineau (Switzerland) J Paul | 6 | 7
4 | (Spain) Í Cervantes (Spain) O Roca Batalla | 7 | 6
(Romania) A Jecan (Romania) FC Jianu | 5 | 2
A Chepelev (Kazakhstan) T Skatov | 6^{8} | 1
3 | (Argentina) TA Tirante (Argentina) JB Torres | 7^{10} | 6
(France) A Reymond (France) C Tabur | 4 | 0
2 | (France) T Arribagé (France) L Sanchez | 6 | 6

Semifinals
(France) M Martineau (Switzerland) J Paul | 4 | 2
4 | (Spain) Í Cervantes (Spain) O Roca Batalla | 6 | 6
3 | (Argentina) TA Tirante (Argentina) JB Torres | 7^{8} | 6^{6} | [10]
2 | (France) T Arribagé (France) L Sanchez | 6^{6} | 7^{8} | [8]

Final
4 | (Spain) Í Cervantes (Spain) O Roca Batalla | 6 | 6
3 | (Argentina) TA Tirante (Argentina) JB Torres | 1 | 2
