= 2026 Taranto Tennis Cup =

- Date: 2 – 8 November
- Edition: 1st
- Location: Taranto, Italy

Champions

Singles
- (France) Matteo Martineau

Doubles
- (Tunisia) Skander Mansouri / (Austria) Maximilian Neuchrist
- Taranto Tennis Cup

The 2026 Taranto Tennis Cup was a professional tennis tournament played on hardcourts. It was the tournament's first edition and part of the 2026 ATP Challenger Tour. It took place in Taranto, Italy between 2 and 8 November 2026.

== Singles main-draw entrants ==
=== Seeds ===
Country	Player	Rank^{1}	Seed
ITA	Francesco Maestrelli	174	1
ESP	Iñaki Montes de la Torre	183	2
ITA	Gianluca Cadenasso	202	3
ITA	Raúl Brancaccio	219	4
GER	Marvin Möller	225	5
GBR	Felix Gill	226	6
CZE	Maxim Mrva	228	7
ITA	Lorenzo Giustino	229	8

- ^{1} Rankings are as of 26 October 2026.

=== Other entrants ===
The following players received wildcards into the singles main draw:

- (Italy) Pierluigi Basile
- (Italy) Gianluca Cadenasso
- (Italy) Filippo Romano

The following players received entry from the qualifying draw:

- (Bulgaria) Adrian Andreev
- (Hungary) Péter Makk
- (France) Loann Massard
- (Italy) Leonardo Rossi
- (Italy) Jacopo Vasamì
- (United Kingdom) Marcus Walters

== Champions ==
=== Singles ===
- (France) Matteo Martineau def. (Switzerland) Kilian Feldbausch 6–3, 6–2.

=== Doubles ===
- (Tunisia) Skander Mansouri / (Austria) Maximilian Neuchrist def. (Spain) Ignasi Forcano / (Spain) Rafael Izquierdo Luque 6–4, 7–5.
