= 2022 Internationaux de Tennis de Troyes – Singles =

Singles
- 2022 Internationaux de Tennis de Troyes

Final
- Champion: (Argentina) Juan Bautista Torres
- Runner-up: (Lebanon) Benjamin Hassan
- Score: 7–6^{(7–2)}, 6–2

Events
Singles	Doubles
Internationaux de Tennis de Troyes	· 2023 →

This was the first edition of the tournament. It was originally supposed to be held in 2020 but was canceled due to the COVID-19 pandemic.

Juan Bautista Torres won the title after defeating Benjamin Hassan 7–6^{(7–2)}, 6–2 in the final.

== Seeds ==
1. (Croatia) Nino Serdarušić (second round)
2. (Argentina) Thiago Agustín Tirante (semifinals)
3. (Argentina) Genaro Alberto Olivieri (first round)
4. (Kazakhstan) Timofey Skatov (second round)
5. Evgeny Karlovskiy (first round)
6. (Switzerland) Johan Nikles (first round)
7. (Belgium) Michael Geerts (quarterfinals)
8. (Poland) Daniel Michalski (second round)

== Draw ==
=== Key ===
- Q = Qualifier
- WC = Wild card
- LL = Lucky loser
- Alt = Alternate
- SE = Special exempt
- PR = Protected ranking
- ITF = ITF entry
- JE = Junior exempt
- w/o = Walkover
- r = Retired
- d = Defaulted
- SR = Special ranking

=== Finals ===
Semifinals
(Lebanon) Benjamin Hassan	6	7^{9}
(Italy) Raúl Brancaccio	2	6^{7}
(Argentina) Juan Bautista Torres	6	3	7
2	(Argentina) Thiago Agustín Tirante	4	6	5

Final
(Lebanon) Benjamin Hassan	6^{2}	2
(Argentina) Juan Bautista Torres	7^{7}	6

=== Top half ===
First round
1	(Croatia) N Serdarušić	6	6
PR	(Belgium) J De Loore	3	4
Q	(France) M Martineau	7^{7}	5	1
(Lebanon) B Hassan	6^{2}	7	6
WC	(France) A Fils	6	4	6
(Argentina) H Casanova	4	6	4
Q	(Italy) F Maestrelli	6	7
6	(Switzerland) J Nikles	1	5
4	(Kazakhstan) T Skatov	6	6
WC	(Spain) Abel Hernández Aguila	4	1
Q	(Bulgaria) A Andreev	4	6	2
(Spain) N Sánchez Izquierdo	6	0	6
(Italy) R Brancaccio	4	6	6
Alt	(France) T Lamasine	6	4	3
Alt	(Brazil) P Boscardin Dias	2	6	1
8	(Poland) D Michalski	6	3	6

Second round
1	(Croatia) N Serdarušić	6^{2}	3
(Lebanon) B Hassan	7^{7}	6
WC	(France) A Fils	6	6
Q	(Italy) F Maestrelli	1	2
4	(Kazakhstan) T Skatov	0	2
(Spain) N Sánchez Izquierdo	6	6
(Italy) R Brancaccio	5	6	6
8	(Poland) D Michalski	7	4	2

Quarterfinals
(Lebanon) B Hassan	6	0	7
WC	(France) A Fils	2	6	5
(Spain) N Sánchez Izquierdo	0	2
(Italy) R Brancaccio	6	6

Semifinals
(Lebanon) B Hassan	6	7^{9}
(Italy) R Brancaccio	2	6^{7}

=== Bottom half ===
First round
5	E Karlovskiy	0	6	2
WC	(France) L Van Assche	6	3	6
(Spain) O Roca Batalla	3	4
(France) C Hemery	6	6
(France) M Janvier	0	1
(Argentina) JB Torres	6	6
(Italy) L Giustino	7	6^{7}	6
3	(Argentina) GA Olivieri	5	7^{9}	1
7	(Belgium) M Geerts	6	6
Q	(Switzerland) J Paul	4	2
Q	(France) C Tabur	6	6
Q	Andrey Chepelev	3	4
(Germany) S Fanselow	2	4
(Romania) FC Jianu	6	6
(Poland) K Żuk	5	1
2	(Argentina) TA Tirante	7	6

Second round
WC	(France) L Van Assche	3	6	6^{2}
(France) C Hemery	6	3	7^{7}
(Argentina) JB Torres	6	6
(Italy) L Giustino	4	3
7	(Belgium) M Geerts	6	6
Q	(France) C Tabur	4	1
(Romania) FC Jianu	4	7^{7}	2
2	(Argentina) TA Tirante	6	6^{5}	6

Quarterfinals
(France) C Hemery	5	2
(Argentina) JB Torres	7	6
7	(Belgium) M Geerts	3	4
2	(Argentina) TA Tirante	6	6

Semifinals
(Argentina) JB Torres	6	3	7
2	(Argentina) TA Tirante	4	6	5
