= 2024 Internationaux de Tennis de Troyes – Singles =

Singles
- 2024 Internationaux de Tennis de Troyes

Final
- Champion: (France) Gabriel Debru
- Runner-up: (Kazakhstan) Timofey Skatov
- Score: 6–3, 6–7^{(1–7)}, 7–5

Events
Singles	Doubles
- Internationaux de Tennis de Troyes

Manuel Guinard was the defending champion but chose not to defend his title.

Gabriel Debru won the title after defeating Timofey Skatov 6–3, 6–7^{(1–7)}, 7–5 in the final.

== Seeds ==
1. (Argentina) Marco Trungelliti (first round)
2. (France) Calvin Hemery (first round, retired)
3. (Kazakhstan) Timofey Skatov (final)
4. (Ecuador) Álvaro Guillén Meza (first round)
5. (Lithuania) Vilius Gaubas (second round)
6. (France) Tristan Lamasine (first round)
7. (Denmark) Elmer Møller (first round)
8. (Spain) Martín Landaluce (quarterfinals)

== Draw ==
Key

- Q = Qualifier
- WC = Wild card
- LL = Lucky loser
- Alt = Alternate
- ITF = ITF entry
- PR = Protected ranking
- SR = Special ranking
- SE = Special exempt
- JE = Junior exempt
- JR = Junior Accelerator Programme entrant
- CO = College Accelerator Programme entrant
- NG = Next Gen Accelerator Program entrant
- w/o = Walkover
- r = Retired
- d = Defaulted

=== Finals ===
Semifinals
(Italy) Lorenzo Giustino	6^{5}	4
3	(Kazakhstan) Timofey Skatov	7^{7}	6
WC	(France) Lilian Marmousez	6	2	1
(France) Gabriel Debru	2	6	6

Final
3	(Kazakhstan) Timofey Skatov	3	7^{7}	5
(France) Gabriel Debru	6	6^{1}	7

=== Top half ===
First round
1	(Argentina) M Trungelliti	6	6^{4}	2
(Uzbekistan) K Sultanov	3	7^{7}	6
(Italy) L Giustino	6	6
Q	(France) C Bittoun Kouzmine	2	1
Q	E Karlovskiy	7	6
Q	(France) Maxence Beaugé	5	4
(Syria) H Naw	6	7^{7}
7	(Denmark) E Møller	4	6^{4}
3	(Kazakhstan) T Skatov	6	6^{5}	6
Q	(Switzerland) M Brunold	1	7^{7}	3
WC	(France) Maxence Rivet	6	2	2
(France) Mathys Erhard	3	6	6
Q	(Poland) Olaf Pieczkowski	6	6
(France) C Denolly	3	4
(Czech Republic) J Forejtek	7^{7}	6
6	(France) T Lamasine	6^{5}	3

Second round
(Uzbekistan) K Sultanov	2	2
(Italy) L Giustino	6	6
Q	E Karlovskiy	6	6
(Syria) H Naw	1	3
3	(Kazakhstan) T Skatov	6	6
(France) M Erhard	4	3
Q	(Poland) O Pieczkowski	6^{5}	2
(Czech Republic) J Forejtek	7^{7}	6

Quarterfinals
(Italy) L Giustino	6	6^{4}	7
Q	E Karlovskiy	0	7^{7}	5
3	(Kazakhstan) T Skatov	6	6
(Czech Republic) J Forejtek	3	3

Semifinals
(Italy) L Giustino	6^{5}	4
3	(Kazakhstan) T Skatov	7^{7}	6

=== Bottom half ===
First round
5	(Lithuania) V Gaubas	6	6
WC	(Spain) Abel Hernández Aguila	2	3
Q	(Austria) N Oberleitner	7	6
(Spain) Carlos López Montagud	5	3
WC	(France) Lilian Marmousez	6	6
(Austria) S Kopp	4	2
PR	(Spain) N Álvarez Varona	4	6	6
4	(Ecuador) Á Guillén Meza	6	2	3
8	(Spain) M Landaluce	6	2	6
(Spain) C Taberner	4	6	2
(Belgium) M Geerts	6	6
(Spain) D Jordà Sanchis	4	3
(Germany) S Fanselow	6	6
(Ukraine) Vadym Ursu	1	3
(France) G Debru	7	1
2	(France) C Hemery	5	0^{r}

Second round
5	(Lithuania) V Gaubas	4	2
Q	(Austria) N Oberleitner	6	6
WC	(France) L Marmousez	1	6	6
PR	(Spain) N Álvarez Varona	6	2	4
8	(Spain) M Landaluce	7^{7}	6
(Belgium) M Geerts	6^{4}	1
(Germany) S Fanselow	2	3
(France) G Debru	6	6

Quarterfinals
Q	(Austria) N Oberleitner	6	4	6^{5}
WC	(France) L Marmousez	2	6	7^{7}
8	(Spain) M Landaluce	7	2	6^{5}
(France) G Debru	5	6	7^{7}

Semifinals
WC	(France) L Marmousez	6	2	1
(France) G Debru	2	6	6
