= 2026 Taranto Tennis Cup – Singles =

Singles
- 2026 Taranto Tennis Cup

Final
- Champion: (France) Matteo Martineau
- Runner-up: (Switzerland) Kilian Feldbausch
- Score: 6–3, 6–2

Events
Singles	Doubles
- Taranto Tennis Cup

This was the first edition of the tournament.

Matteo Martineau won the title after defeating Kilian Feldbausch 6–3, 6–2 in the final.

== Seeds ==
1. (Italy) Francesco Maestrelli (quarterfinals)
2. (Spain) Iñaki Montes de la Torre (first round)
3. (Italy) Gianluca Cadenasso (second round)
4. (Italy) Raúl Brancaccio (first round)
5. (Germany) Marvin Möller (first round)
6. (United Kingdom) Felix Gill (semifinals)
7. (Czech Republic) Maxim Mrva (quarterfinals)
8. (Italy) Lorenzo Giustino (first round)

== Draw ==
Key

- Q = Qualifier
- WC = Wild card
- LL = Lucky loser
- Alt = Alternate
- ITF = ITF entry
- PR = Protected ranking
- SR = Special ranking
- SE = Special exempt
- JE = Junior exempt
- JR = Junior Accelerator Programme entrant
- CO = College Accelerator Programme entrant
- NG = Next Gen Accelerator Program entrant
- w/o = Walkover
- r = Retired
- d = Defaulted

=== Finals ===
Semifinals
(Italy) Carlo Alberto Caniato	4	4
(Switzerland) Kilian Feldbausch	6	6
6	(United Kingdom) Felix Gill	1	2
(France) Matteo Martineau	6	6

Final
(Switzerland) Kilian Feldbausch	3	2
(France) Matteo Martineau	6	6

=== Top half ===
First round
1	(Italy) F Maestrelli	6	6
(Italy) F Forti	3	2
WC	(Italy) F Romano	3	5
Q	(Hungary) Péter Makk	6	7
(South Africa) P Henning	6	6
(France) C Hemery	1	2
(Italy) CA Caniato	7^{7}	6
8	(Italy) L Giustino	6^{5}	4
4	(Italy) R Brancaccio	4	4
(Switzerland) K Feldbausch	6	6
Q	(Italy) Leonardo Rossi	3	3
(Switzerland) R Bertola	6	6
(India) S Nagal	7^{7}	6
(Ukraine) G Kravchenko	6^{4}	2
(France) H Grenier	7	6
5	(Germany) M Möller	5	3

Second round
1	(Italy) F Maestrelli	6	6
Q	(Hungary) P Makk	3	2
(South Africa) P Henning	6	1	6^{4}
(Italy) CA Caniato	4	6	7^{7}
(Switzerland) K Feldbausch	7^{7}	6^{4}	6
(Switzerland) R Bertola	6^{4}	7^{7}	2
(India) S Nagal	6	6
(France) H Grenier	3	2

Quarterfinals
1	(Italy) F Maestrelli	6^{5}	4
(Italy) CA Caniato	7^{7}	6
(Switzerland) K Feldbausch	6	5	7^{7}
(India) S Nagal	3	7	6^{4}

Semifinals
(Italy) CA Caniato	4	4
(Switzerland) K Feldbausch	6	6

=== Bottom half ===
First round
6	(United Kingdom) F Gill	7^{8}	7
Q	(United Kingdom) Marcus Walters	6^{6}	5
(Belgium) B Gadamauri	5	6	7^{7}
WC	(Italy) Pierluigi Basile	7	1	6^{4}
(United Kingdom) J Clarke	6	6
(Italy) F Bondioli	4	2
(France) F Bax	5	2
3/WC	(Italy) G Cadenasso	7	6
7	(Czech Republic) M Mrva	6	7
(Italy) M Ribecai	4	5
Q	(France) Loann Massard	5	0^{r}
(France) T Faurel	7	4
Q	(Bulgaria) A Andreev	3
Q	(Italy) J Vasamì	3^{r}
(France) M Martineau	6	6
2	(Spain) I Montes de la Torre	4	4

Second round
6	(United Kingdom) F Gill	7^{7}	7^{7}
(Belgium) B Gadamauri	6^{5}	6^{4}
(United Kingdom) J Clarke	6	6
3/WC	(Italy) G Cadenasso	2	4
7	(Czech Republic) M Mrva	7^{7}	1	6
(France) T Faurel	6^{3}	6	2
Q	(Bulgaria) A Andreev	4	6	5
(France) M Martineau	6	2	7

Quarterfinals
6	(United Kingdom) F Gill	6	4	6
(United Kingdom) J Clarke	4	6	2
7	(Czech Republic) M Mrva	5	7	4
(France) M Martineau	7	5	6

Semifinals
6	(United Kingdom) F Gill	1	2
(France) M Martineau	6	6
