= 2026 Aspria Tennis Cup – Doubles =

Doubles
- 2026 Aspria Tennis Cup

Final
- Champions: (Italy) Francesco Forti (Italy) Filippo Romano
- Runners-up: (India) Siddhant Banthia (India) Arjun Kadhe
- Score: 6–3, 7–6^{(7–5)}

Events
| Singles | Doubles |
- Aspria Tennis Cup

Matthew Romios and Ryan Seggerman were the defending champions but chose not to defend their title.

Francesco Forti and Filippo Romano won the title after defeating Siddhant Banthia and Arjun Kadhe 6–3, 7–6^{(7–5)} in the final.

== Seeds ==
1. (Germany) Tim Rühl / (Netherlands) Mick Veldheer (quarterfinals)
2. (Bolivia) Boris Arias / (Denmark) Johannes Ingildsen (quarterfinals)
3. (India) Siddhant Banthia / (India) Arjun Kadhe (final)
4. (Spain) Sergio Martos Gornés / (Poland) Szymon Walków (first round)

== Draw ==
Key

- Q = Qualifier
- WC = Wild card
- LL = Lucky loser
- Alt = Alternate
- ITF = ITF entry
- PR = Protected ranking
- SR = Special ranking
- SE = Special exempt
- JE = Junior exempt
- JR = Junior Accelerator Programme entrant
- CO = College Accelerator Programme entrant
- NG = Next Gen Accelerator Program entrant
- w/o = Walkover
- r = Retired
- d = Defaulted

First round
1 | (Germany) T Rühl (Netherlands) M Veldheer | 6 | 6
(Spain) Iván Marrero Curbelo (Venezuela) B Pérez | 4 | 4
(Sweden) Oliver Johansson (Ukraine) V Uzhylovskyi | 6^{3} | 4
WC | (Italy) Pierluigi Basile (Italy) Juan Cruz Martin Manzano | 7^{7} | 6
3 | (India) S Banthia (India) A Kadhe | 6^{2} | 6 | [10]
(Uruguay) I Carou (Argentina) FA Gómez | 7^{7} | 3 | [5]
(Italy) G Ricca (Brazil) M Zormann | 3 | 3
(Spain) B Pujol Navarro (Spain) D Vega Hernández | 6 | 6
(Spain) M Damas (Spain) O Roca Batalla | 6 | 6
WC | (Italy) Francesco Giuseppe Colasanto (Italy) Samuele Seghetti | 3 | 3
(Italy) F Forti (Italy) F Romano | 6 | 4 | [10]
4 | (Spain) S Martos Gornés (Poland) S Walków | 1 | 6 | [5]
(Italy) R Brancaccio (Italy) F Passaro | 6^{3} | 4
(Ukraine) G Kravchenko (Spain) A Sánchez Quílez | 7^{7} | 6
(Argentina) A Barrena (Argentina) A Collarini
2 | (Bolivia) B Arias (Denmark) J Ingildsen | w/o

Quarterfinals
1 | (Germany) T Rühl (Netherlands) M Veldheer | 3 | 7^{7} | [4]
WC | (Italy) P Basile (Italy) JC Martin Manzano | 6 | 6^{4} | [10]
3 | (India) S Banthia (India) A Kadhe | 7^{7} | 6
(Spain) B Pujol Navarro (Spain) D Vega Hernández | 6^{4} | 3
(Spain) M Damas (Spain) O Roca Batalla | 6 | 3 | [10]
(Italy) F Forti (Italy) F Romano | 2 | 6 | [12]
(Ukraine) G Kravchenko (Spain) A Sánchez Quílez | 6^{3} | 6 | [10]
2 | (Bolivia) B Arias (Denmark) J Ingildsen | 7^{7} | 2 | [6]

Semifinals
WC | (Italy) P Basile (Italy) JC Martin Manzano
3 | (India) S Banthia (India) A Kadhe | w/o
(Italy) F Forti (Italy) F Romano | 6 | 6
(Ukraine) G Kravchenko (Spain) A Sánchez Quílez | 3 | 1

Final
3 | (India) S Banthia (India) A Kadhe | 3 | 6^{5}
(Italy) F Forti (Italy) F Romano | 6 | 7^{7}
