= 2025 Internationaux de Tennis de Troyes – Doubles =

Doubles
- 2025 Internationaux de Tennis de Troyes

Final
- Champions: (Spain) Mario Mansilla Díez (Spain) Bruno Pujol Navarro
- Runners-up: (Czech Republic) David Poljak (Germany) Tim Rühl
- Score: 7–6^{(7–3)}, 7–6^{(7–2)}

Events
Singles	Doubles
- Internationaux de Tennis de Troyes

Neil Oberleitner and Jakub Paul were the defending champions but only Oberleitner chose to defend his title, partnering Mats Rosenkranz. They lost in the semifinals to David Poljak and Tim Rühl.

Mario Mansilla Díez and Bruno Pujol Navarro won the title after defeating Poljak and Rühl 7–6^{(7–3)}, 7–6^{(7–2)} in the final.

== Seeds ==
1. (Peru) Arklon Huertas del Pino / (Peru) Conner Huertas del Pino (quarterfinals)
2. (Czech Republic) David Poljak / (Germany) Tim Rühl (final)
3. (Bolivia) Boris Arias / (Israel) Roy Stepanov (quarterfinals)
4. (Philippines) Francis Alcantara / (India) Parikshit Somani (first round)

== Draw ==
Key

- Q = Qualifier
- WC = Wild card
- LL = Lucky loser
- Alt = Alternate
- ITF = ITF entry
- PR = Protected ranking
- SR = Special ranking
- SE = Special exempt
- JE = Junior exempt
- JR = Junior Accelerator Programme entrant
- CO = College Accelerator Programme entrant
- NG = Next Gen Accelerator Program entrant
- w/o = Walkover
- r = Retired
- d = Defaulted

=== Draw ===
First round
1	(Peru) A Huertas del Pino (Peru) C Huertas del Pino	6	7^{16}
(France) C Denolly (France) A Géa	2	6^{14}
(Spain) M Mansilla Díez (Spain) B Pujol Navarro	6	6
WC	(France) Augustin Damonte (France) Lancelot Erler	2	1
3	(Bolivia) B Arias (Israel) R Stepanov	6	6
(Italy) Simone Agostini (Brazil) PA Saraiva dos Santos	3	4
WC	(France) Constant de la Bassetière (France) Arthus Morisson de la Bassetière	2	3
(United Kingdom) S Duncan (United Kingdom) T Hands	6	6
(Spain) J Barranco Cosano (Spain) N Sánchez Izquierdo	4	1
(Austria) N Oberleitner (Germany) M Rosenkranz	6	6
(France) Axel Garcian (France) H Mayot	6	6
4	(Philippines) FC Alcantara (India) Parikshit Somani	4	3
Alt	(France) F Bax (Netherlands) J Sels	3	5
(Bulgaria) A Genov; M Sharipov	6	7
(France) A Reymond (Italy) Augusto Virgili	2	4
2	(Czech Republic) D Poljak (Germany) T Rühl	6	6

Quarterfinals
1	(Peru) A Huertas del Pino (Peru) C Huertas del Pino	6^{6}	6	[6]
(Spain) M Mansilla Díez (Spain) B Pujol Navarro	7^{8}	2	[10]
3	(Bolivia) B Arias (Israel) R Stepanov	2	3
(United Kingdom) S Duncan (United Kingdom) T Hands	6	6
(Austria) N Oberleitner (Germany) M Rosenkranz	7	5	[10]
(France) A Garcian (France) H Mayot	5	7	[5]
(Bulgaria) A Genov; M Sharipov	2	4
2	(Czech Republic) D Poljak (Germany) T Rühl	6	6

Semifinals
(Spain) M Mansilla Díez (Spain) B Pujol Navarro	6	6^{3}	[10]
(United Kingdom) S Duncan (United Kingdom) T Hands	4	7^{7}	[3]
(Austria) N Oberleitner (Germany) M Rosenkranz	2	7^{7}	[5]
2	(Czech Republic) D Poljak (Germany) T Rühl	6	6^{3}	[10]

Final
(Spain) M Mansilla Díez (Spain) B Pujol Navarro	7^{7}	7^{7}
2	(Czech Republic) D Poljak (Germany) T Rühl	6^{3}	6^{2}
