= 2026 Internationaux de Tennis de Troyes =

- Date: 29 June – 5 July
- Edition: 5th
- Surface: Clay
- Location: Troyes, France

Champions

Singles
- (Germany) Marvin Möller

Doubles
- (Netherlands) Mats Hermans / (Brazil) Igor Marcondes
- Internationaux de Tennis de Troyes

The 2026 Internationaux de Tennis de Troyes was a professional tennis tournament played on clay courts. It was the fifth edition of the tournament which was part of the 2026 ATP Challenger Tour. It took place in Troyes, France from 29 June and 5 July 2026.

== Singles main draw entrants ==
=== Seeds ===
Country	Player	Rank^{1}	Seed
ITA	Lorenzo Giustino	228	1
RSA	Philip Henning	252	2
SUI	Kilian Feldbausch	279	3
FRA	Calvin Hemery	282	4
USA	Dali Blanch	289	5
~~BRA~~	~~Thiago Seyboth Wild~~	~~292~~	~~6~~
FRA	Thomas Faurel	307	7
ESP	Iñaki Montes de la Torre	312	8

- ^{1} Rankings as of 22 June 2026.

=== Other entrants ===
The following players received wildcards into the singles main draw:

- (France) Mickael Kaouk
- (France) Leo Raquillet
- (France) Cosme Rolland de Ravel

The following player received entry into the singles main draw through the Junior Accelerator programme:

- (Bulgaria) Alexander Vasilev

The following players received entry into the singles main draw as alternates:

- (Italy) Samuele Pieri
- (Germany) Patrick Zahraj

The following players received entry from the qualifying draw:

- (Spain) Izan Almazán Valiente
- Svyatoslav Gulin
- Pavel Lagutin
- (Poland) Fryderyk Lechno-Wasiutyński
- (Switzerland) Luca Stäheli
- (Germany) Kai Wehnelt

The following player received entry as a lucky loser:

- (France) Maxime Chazal

== Champions ==
=== Singles ===
- (Germany) Marvin Möller def. (Switzerland) Kilian Feldbausch 7–6^{(7–5)}, 6–3.

=== Doubles ===
- (Netherlands) Mats Hermans / (Brazil) Igor Marcondes def. (Bulgaria) Anthony Genov / (Germany) Kai Wehnelt 6–3, 3–6, [10–7].
