= 2023 Internationaux de Tennis de Troyes – Singles =

Singles
- 2023 Internationaux de Tennis de Troyes

Final
- Champion: (France) Manuel Guinard
- Runner-up: (France) Calvin Hemery
- Score: 6–4, 6–3

Events
Singles	Doubles
- Internationaux de Tennis de Troyes

Juan Bautista Torres was the defending champion but chose not to defend his title.

Manuel Guinard won the title after defeating Calvin Hemery 6–4, 6–3 in the final.

== Seeds ==
1. (Argentina) Genaro Alberto Olivieri (second round)
2. Evgeny Donskoy (first round)
3. (Argentina) Marco Trungelliti (first round)
4. (France) Térence Atmane (quarterfinals)
5. (Italy) Gianluca Mager (second round)
6. (Italy) Lorenzo Giustino (quarterfinals)
7. (France) Titouan Droguet (withdrew)
8. (Lebanon) Benjamin Hassan (first round)

== Draw ==
Key

- Q = Qualifier
- WC = Wild card
- LL = Lucky loser
- Alt = Alternate
- ITF = ITF entry
- PR = Protected ranking
- SR = Special ranking
- SE = Special exempt
- JE = Junior exempt
- JR = Junior Accelerator Programme entrant
- CO = College Accelerator Programme entrant
- NG = Next Gen Accelerator Program entrant
- w/o = Walkover
- r = Retired
- d = Defaulted

=== Finals ===
Semifinals
Q	(France) Calvin Hemery	6	3	7^{7}
Q	(Spain) David Jordà Sanchis	4	6	6^{4}
Q	(Croatia) Duje Ajduković	3	6	0
Q	(France) Manuel Guinard	6	4	6

Final
Q	(France) Calvin Hemery	4	3
Q	(France) Manuel Guinard	6	6

=== Top half ===
First round
1	(Argentina) GA Olivieri	5	6	6
WC	(France) S Gueymard Wayenburg	7	4	0
Q	(France) Maxence Beaugé	3	6^{2}
Q	(France) C Hemery	6	7^{7}
(Germany) Lucas Gerch	6	6
(Germany) Elmar Ejupovic	3	2
(France) V Royer	4	4
6	(Italy) L Giustino	6	6
3	(Argentina) M Trungelliti	4	2
(Italy) G Fonio	6	6
(Tunisia) M Echargui	6	4	7^{8}
LL	(Georgia (country)) S Purtseladze	4	6	6^{6}
(Spain) D Rincón	6	5	6^{3}
Q	(Spain) D Jordà Sanchis	2	7	7^{7}
(Spain) A Moro Cañas	4	6^{1}
5	(Italy) G Mager	6	7^{7}

Second round
1	(Argentina) GA Olivieri	3	7	2
Q	(France) C Hemery	6	5	6
(Germany) L Gerch	3	6	3
6	(Italy) L Giustino	6	3	6
(Italy) G Fonio	6	6
(Tunisia) M Echargui	3	2
Q	(Spain) D Jordà Sanchis	6	7^{7}
5	(Italy) G Mager	4	6^{5}

Quarterfinals
Q	(France) C Hemery	6	4	6
6	(Italy) L Giustino	4	6	1
(Italy) G Fonio	2^{r}
Q	(Spain) D Jordà Sanchis	3

Semifinals
Q	(France) C Hemery	6	3	7^{7}
Q	(Spain) D Jordà Sanchis	4	6	6^{4}

=== Bottom half ===
First round
8	(Lebanon) B Hassan	6	4	4
Q	(Croatia) D Ajduković	4	6	6
(Serbia) N Milojević	3	3
Q	(France) M Martineau	6	6
(Spain) N Sánchez Izquierdo	6^{8}	6	4
(Bolivia) M Dellien	7^{10}	0	6
(Spain) P Martín Tiffon	2	5
4	(France) T Atmane	6	7
Q	(France) M Guinard	7^{7}	6
(France) M Janvier	6^{5}	3
(Spain) Á López San Martín	6	1	4
WC	(France) Mathys Erhard	2	6	6
(Norway) V Durasovic	6	6
WC	(Spain) Abel Hernández Aguila	1	4
(Canada) S Diez	6	6
2	E Donskoy	4	2

Second round
Q	(Croatia) D Ajduković	6	6
Q	(France) M Martineau	3	2
(Bolivia) M Dellien	6	2	4
4	(France) T Atmane	2	6	6
Q	(France) M Guinard	6	6
WC	(France) M Erhard	4	1
(Norway) V Durasovic	3	6	6
(Canada) S Diez	6	3	1

Quarterfinals
Q	(Croatia) D Ajduković	6^{4}	6	6
4	(France) T Atmane	7^{7}	3	2
Q	(France) M Guinard	6	6
(Norway) V Durasovic	4	2

Semifinals
Q	(Croatia) D Ajduković	3	6	0
Q	(France) M Guinard	6	4	6
