= 2026 Internationaux de Tennis de Troyes – Singles =

Singles
- 2026 Internationaux de Tennis de Troyes

Final
- Champion: (Germany) Marvin Möller
- Runner-up: (Switzerland) Kilian Feldbausch
- Score: 7–6^{(7–5)}, 6–3

Events
Singles	Doubles
- Internationaux de Tennis de Troyes

Jan Choinski was the defending champion but chose not to defend his title.

Marvin Möller won the title after defeating Kilian Feldbausch 7–6^{(7–5)}, 6–3 in the final.

== Seeds ==
1. (Italy) Lorenzo Giustino (semifinals)
2. (South Africa) Philip Henning (first round)
3. (Switzerland) Kilian Feldbausch (final)
4. (France) Calvin Hemery (semifinals)
5. (United States) Dali Blanch (first round)
6. (Brazil) Thiago Seyboth Wild (withdrew)
7. (France) Thomas Faurel (first round)
8. (Spain) Iñaki Montes de la Torre (quarterfinals)

== Draw ==
Key

- Q = Qualifier
- WC = Wild card
- LL = Lucky loser
- Alt = Alternate
- ITF = ITF entry
- PR = Protected ranking
- SR = Special ranking
- SE = Special exempt
- JE = Junior exempt
- JR = Junior Accelerator Programme entrant
- CO = College Accelerator Programme entrant
- NG = Next Gen Accelerator Program entrant
- w/o = Walkover
- r = Retired
- d = Defaulted

=== Finals ===
Semifinals
1	(Italy) Lorenzo Giustino	4	3
3	(Switzerland) Kilian Feldbausch	6	6
4	(France) Calvin Hemery	6^{5}	6^{7}
(Germany) Marvin Möller	7^{7}	7^{9}

Final
3	(Switzerland) Kilian Feldbausch	6^{5}	3
(Germany) Marvin Möller	7^{7}	6

=== Top half ===
First round
1	(Italy) L Giustino	6	1	6
Q	Svyatoslav Gulin	4	6	4
(Germany) M Topo	6	3	7
WC	(France) Leo Raquillet	1	6	5
(France) G Blancaneaux	7^{8}	3	2
Q	(Switzerland) Luca Stäheli	6^{6}	6	6
(Brazil) I Marcondes	7^{11}	3	6
7	(France) T Faurel	6^{9}	6	4
3	(Switzerland) K Feldbausch	6	6
Alt	(Italy) S Pieri	2	2
(India) M Dhamne	6^{9}	6^{7}
(Greece) Ioannis Xilas	7^{11}	7^{9}
LL	(France) M Chazal	7	3	6
Alt	(Germany) P Zahraj	5	6	1
(Italy) F Bondioli	3	6	1
8	(Spain) I Montes de la Torre	6	4	6

Second round
1	(Italy) L Giustino	6	7^{7}
(Germany) M Topo	1	6^{3}
Q	(Switzerland) L Stäheli	6^{4}	0
(Brazil) I Marcondes	7^{7}	6
3	(Switzerland) K Feldbausch	6	6
(Greece) I Xilas	1	4
LL	(France) M Chazal	5	1
8	(Spain) I Montes de la Torre	7	6

Quarterfinals
1	(Italy) L Giustino	4	7^{7}	6
(Brazil) I Marcondes	6	6^{4}	1
3	(Switzerland) K Feldbausch	6	6
8	(Spain) I Montes de la Torre	1	3

Semifinals
1	(Italy) L Giustino	4	3
3	(Switzerland) K Feldbausch	6	6

=== Bottom half ===
First round
Q	Pavel Lagutin	7	3	2
(Ivory Coast) E Coulibaly	5	6	6
JR	(Bulgaria) A Vasilev	1	6	6
Q	(Germany) K Wehnelt	6	1	1
(Italy) CA Caniato	6	6
Q	(Spain) Izan Almazán Valiente	2	1
(United Kingdom) A Matusevich	2	2
4	(France) C Hemery	6	6
5	(United States) Dali Blanch	5	6	6^{3}
WC	(France) Mickael Kaouk	7	3	7^{7}
(Germany) M Möller	6	6
Q	(Poland) Fryderyk Lechno-Wasiutyński	4	2
WC	(France) Cosme Rolland de Ravel	6^{4}	3
M Sharipov	7^{7}	6
(Switzerland) D Stricker	6	6
2	(South Africa) P Henning	2	4

Second round
(Ivory Coast) E Coulibaly	6	6
JR	(Bulgaria) A Vasilev	4	2
(Italy) CA Caniato	3	1
4	(France) C Hemery	6	6
WC	(France) M Kaouk	2	3
(Germany) M Möller	6	6
M Sharipov	4
(Switzerland) D Stricker	2^{r}

Quarterfinals
(Ivory Coast) E Coulibaly	2^{r}
4	(France) C Hemery	1
(Germany) M Möller	6	3	7^{7}
M Sharipov	2	6	6^{1}

Semifinals
4	(France) C Hemery	6^{5}	6^{7}
(Germany) M Möller	7^{7}	7^{9}
