= 2025 Internationaux de Tennis de Troyes =

- Date: 30 June – 6 July
- Edition: 4th
- Surface: Clay
- Location: Troyes, France

Champions

Singles
- (United Kingdom) Jan Choinski

Doubles
- (Spain) Mario Mansilla Díez / (Spain) Bruno Pujol Navarro
- Internationaux de Tennis de Troyes

The 2025 Internationaux de Tennis de Troyes was a professional tennis tournament played on clay courts. It was the fourth edition of the tournament which was part of the 2025 ATP Challenger Tour. It took place in Troyes, France from 30 June and 6 July 2025.

== Singles main draw entrants ==
=== Seeds ===
Country	Player	Rank^{1}	Seed
ARG	Marco Trungelliti	152	1
FRA	Calvin Hemery	180	2
GBR	Jan Choinski	202	3
KAZ	Timofey Skatov	212	4
FRA	Clément Tabur	215	5
BRA	João Lucas Reis da Silva	254	6
	Marat Sharipov	262	7
ITA	Lorenzo Giustino	275	8

- ^{1} Rankings as of 23 June 2025.

=== Other entrants ===
The following players received wildcards into the singles main draw:

- (France) Thomas Faurel
- (France) Benoît Paire
- (France) Théo Papamalamis

The following player received entry into the singles main draw using a protected ranking:

- (North Macedonia) Kalin Ivanovski

The following player received entry into the singles main draw as an alternate:

- (France) Florent Bax

The following players received entry from the qualifying draw:

- (Serbia) Branko Djuric
- (France) Tristan Lamasine
- (France) Harold Mayot
- (France) Cosme Rolland de Ravel
- (Netherlands) Niels Visker
- (Sweden) Mikael Ymer

== Champions ==
=== Singles ===
- (United Kingdom) Jan Choinski def. (France) Calvin Hemery 6–4, 6–7^{(4–7)}, 6–2.

=== Doubles ===
- (Spain) Mario Mansilla Díez / (Spain) Bruno Pujol Navarro def. (Czech Republic) David Poljak / (Germany) Tim Rühl 7–6^{(7–3)}, 7–6^{(7–2)}.
