= 2024 Internationaux de Tennis de Troyes =

- Date: 1 – 7 July
- Edition: 3rd
- Surface: Clay
- Location: Troyes, France

Champions

Singles
- (France) Gabriel Debru

Doubles
- (Austria) Neil Oberleitner / (Switzerland) Jakub Paul
← 2023 ·	Internationaux de Tennis de Troyes	· 2025 →

The 2024 Internationaux de Tennis de Troyes was a professional tennis tournament played on clay courts. It was the third edition of the tournament which was part of the 2024 ATP Challenger Tour. It took place in Troyes, France from 1 and 7 July 2024.

== Singles main draw entrants ==
=== Seeds ===
Country	Player	Rank^{1}	Seed
ARG	Marco Trungelliti	153	1
FRA	Calvin Hemery	200	2
KAZ	Timofey Skatov	229	3
ECU	Álvaro Guillén Meza	259	4
LTU	Vilius Gaubas	272	5
FRA	Tristan Lamasine	280	6
DEN	Elmer Møller	281	7
ESP	Martín Landaluce	303	8

- ^{1} Rankings as of 24 June 2024.

=== Other entrants ===
The following players received wildcards into the singles main draw:

- (Spain) Abel Hernández Aguila
- (France) Lilian Marmousez
- (France) Maxence Rivet

The following player received entry into the singles main draw using a protected ranking:

- (Spain) Nicolás Álvarez Varona

The following players received entry from the qualifying draw:

- (France) Maxence Beaugé
- (France) Constantin Bittoun Kouzmine
- (Switzerland) Mika Brunold
- Evgeny Karlovskiy
- (Austria) Neil Oberleitner
- (Poland) Olaf Pieczkowski

== Champions ==
=== Singles ===
- (France) Gabriel Debru def. (Kazakhstan) Timofey Skatov 6–3, 6–7^{(1–7)}, 7–5.

=== Doubles ===
- (Austria) Neil Oberleitner / (Switzerland) Jakub Paul def. (Uzbekistan) Denis Istomin / Evgeny Karlovskiy 6–4, 7–6^{(7–1)}.
