= 2026 Taranto Tennis Cup – Doubles =

Doubles
- 2026 Taranto Tennis Cup

Final
- Champions: (Tunisia) Skander Mansouri (Austria) Maximilian Neuchrist
- Runners-up: (Spain) Ignasi Forcano (Spain) Rafael Izquierdo Luque
- Score: 6–4, 7–5

Events
Singles	Doubles
- Taranto Tennis Cup

This was the first edition of the tournament.

Skander Mansouri and Maximilian Neuchrist won the title after defeating Ignasi Forcano and Rafael Izquierdo Luque 6–4, 7–5 in the final.

== Seeds ==
1. (United States) Benjamin Kittay / (Japan) Takeru Yuzuki (quarterfinals)
2. (Czech Republic) Filip Duda / (Portugal) Tiago Pereira (semifinals)
3. (Tunisia) Skander Mansouri / (Austria) Maximilian Neuchrist (champions)
4. (Spain) Ignasi Forcano / (Spain) Rafael Izquierdo Luque (final)

== Draw ==
Key

- Q = Qualifier
- WC = Wild card
- LL = Lucky loser
- Alt = Alternate
- ITF = ITF entry
- PR = Protected ranking
- SR = Special ranking
- SE = Special exempt
- JE = Junior exempt
- JR = Junior Accelerator Programme entrant
- CO = College Accelerator Programme entrant
- NG = Next Gen Accelerator Program entrant
- w/o = Walkover
- r = Retired
- d = Defaulted

First round
1	(United States) B Kittay (Japan) T Yuzuki	6	6
(Italy) Simone Agostini (Italy) Riccardo Perin	4	4
WC	(Italy) M Ribecai (Italy) Gabriele Volpi	1	3
(United Kingdom) James Hopper (United Kingdom) M Whitehouse	6	6
3	(Tunisia) S Mansouri (Austria) M Neuchrist	7	6
(Italy) F Bondioli (Italy) CA Caniato	5	3
(Netherlands) Brian Bozemoj (Netherlands) Stijn Pel	7^{7}	6
WC	(Italy) Leonardo Borrelli (Italy) Filiberto Fumagalli	6^{3}	3
(France) Marko Marić (Serbia) Tadija Radovanović	3	4
(Poland) Piotr Pawlak (United Kingdom) Marcus Walters	6	6
(Bulgaria) A Andreev (Bulgaria) R Shandarov	3	3
4	(Spain) Ignasi Forcano (Spain) Rafael Izquierdo Luque	6	6
(Italy) Andrea Colombo (Italy) Matteo Sciahbasi
(United Kingdom) J Clarke (India) J Nedunchezhiyan	w/o
(Switzerland) R Bertola (Italy) R Brancaccio	5	2
2	(Czech Republic) F Duda (Portugal) T Pereira	7	6

Quarterfinals
1	(United States) B Kittay (Japan) T Yuzuki	4	6	[8]
(United Kingdom) J Hopper (United Kingdom) M Whitehouse	6	2	[10]
3	(Tunisia) S Mansouri (Austria) M Neuchrist	7^{8}	6
(Netherlands) B Bozemoj (Netherlands) S Pel	6^{6}	3
(Poland) P Pawlak (United Kingdom) M Walters	4	5
4	(Spain) I Forcano (Spain) R Izquierdo Luque	6	7
(United Kingdom) J Clarke (India) J Nedunchezhiyan	3	3
2	(Czech Republic) F Duda (Portugal) T Pereira	6	6

Semifinals
(United Kingdom) J Hopper (United Kingdom) M Whitehouse	6^{4}	1
3	(Tunisia) S Mansouri (Austria) M Neuchrist	7^{7}	6
4	(Spain) I Forcano (Spain) R Izquierdo Luque	6	4	[10]
2	(Czech Republic) F Duda (Portugal) T Pereira	2	6	[5]

Final
3	(Tunisia) S Mansouri (Austria) M Neuchrist	6	7
4	(Spain) I Forcano (Spain) R Izquierdo Luque	4	5
