= 2021 Saint-Tropez Open – Singles =

Singles
- 2021 Saint-Tropez Open

Final
- Champion: (France) Benjamin Bonzi
- Runner-up: (Australia) Christopher O'Connell
- Score: 6–7^{(10–12)}, 6–1, 0–0 ret.

Events
Singles	Doubles
- Saint-Tropez Open

This was the first edition of the tournament.

Benjamin Bonzi won the title after Christopher O'Connell retired before the start of the third set in the final with the score at 6–7^{(10–12)}, 6–1.

== Seeds ==
1. (France) Benjamin Bonzi (champion)
2. (Australia) Christopher O'Connell (final, retired)
3. (France) Grégoire Barrère (quarterfinals)
4. (India) Prajnesh Gunneswaran (first round)
5. (Russia) Roman Safiullin (first round)
6. (Sweden) Elias Ymer (first round)
7. (Turkey) Altuğ Çelikbilek (first round)
8. (Australia) Thanasi Kokkinakis (semifinals)

== Draw ==
Key

- Q = Qualifier
- WC = Wild card
- LL = Lucky loser
- Alt = Alternate
- ITF = ITF entry
- PR = Protected ranking
- SR = Special ranking
- SE = Special exempt
- JE = Junior exempt
- JR = Junior Accelerator Programme entrant
- CO = College Accelerator Programme entrant
- NG = Next Gen Accelerator Program entrant
- w/o = Walkover
- r = Retired
- d = Defaulted

=== Finals ===
Semifinals
1	(France) Benjamin Bonzi	4	6	6
(France) Hugo Grenier	6	3	2
8	(Australia) Thanasi Kokkinakis	1	6^{3}
2	(Australia) Christopher O'Connell	6	7^{7}

Final
1	(France) Benjamin Bonzi	6^{10}	6	0
2	(Australia) Christopher O'Connell	7^{12}	1	0^{r}

=== Top half ===
First round
1	(France) B Bonzi	7^{7}	6
(France) M Bourgue	6^{5}	2
Alt	(France) K Jacquet	6	3	6
(Uzbekistan) D Istomin	4	6	1
Alt	(France) M Guinard	6^{5}	4
(France) E Couacaud	7^{7}	6
WC	(France) L Van Assche	6	6
6	(Sweden) E Ymer	4	3
4	(India) P Gunneswaran	5	3
(France) H Grenier	7	6
Q	(France) D Added	1	3
Q	(Canada) A Galarneau	6	6
LL	(France) M Hamou	1	4
Alt	(France) C Lestienne	6	6
(Italy) T Fabbiano	7^{7}	7^{7}
7	(Turkey) A Çelikbilek	6^{4}	6^{4}

Second round
1	(France) B Bonzi	7	6
Alt	(France) K Jacquet	5	3
(France) E Couacaud	6	6
WC	(France) L Van Assche	3	2
(France) H Grenier	6	6
Q	(Canada) A Galarneau	1	0
Alt	(France) C Lestienne	2	6	6
(Italy) T Fabbiano	6	1	4

Quarterfinals
1	(France) B Bonzi	6	6
(France) E Couacaud	1	4
(France) H Grenier	7	6
Alt	(France) C Lestienne	5	4

Semifinals
1	(France) B Bonzi	4	6	6
(France) H Grenier	6	3	2

=== Bottom half ===
First round
8	(Australia) T Kokkinakis	6	7
Alt	(United States) JC Aragone	3	5
Q	(Russia) B Bobrov	6	7
(Belgium) Z Bergs	4	5
LL	(Estonia) D Glinka	3	3
(Belgium) K Coppejans	6	6
WC	(France) V Royer	6^{4}	1
3	(France) G Barrère	7^{7}	6
5	(Russia) R Safiullin	7^{7}	6^{3}	1
WC	(France) A Cazaux	6^{4}	7^{7}	6
(France) A Müller	6	4	6
(Germany) D Masur	1	6	3
LL	(Sweden) DN Mădăraș	2	6	6
(Japan) G Soeda	6	4	3
Q	(France) Jurgen Briand	2	4
2	(Australia) C O'Connell	6	6

Second round
8	(Australia) T Kokkinakis	6	6
Q	(Russia) B Bobrov	0	2
(Belgium) K Coppejans	6	5	3
3	(France) G Barrère	1	7	6
WC	(France) A Cazaux	2	3
(France) A Müller	6	6
LL	(Sweden) DN Mădăraș	1	4
2	(Australia) C O'Connell	6	6

Quarterfinals
8	(Australia) T Kokkinakis	7^{7}	6^{4}	6
3	(France) G Barrère	6^{5}	7^{7}	4
(France) A Müller	6^{5}	4
2	(Australia) C O'Connell	7^{7}	6

Semifinals
8	(Australia) T Kokkinakis	1	6^{3}
2	(Australia) C O'Connell	6	7^{7}
