= 2025 Internationaux de Tennis de Troyes – Singles =

Singles
- 2025 Internationaux de Tennis de Troyes

Final
- Champion: (United Kingdom) Jan Choinski
- Runner-up: (France) Calvin Hemery
- Score: 6–4, 6–7^{(4–7)}, 6–2

Events
Singles	Doubles
- Internationaux de Tennis de Troyes

Gabriel Debru was the defending champion but chose not to defend his title.

Jan Choinski won the title after defeating Calvin Hemery 6–4, 6–7^{(4–7)}, 6–2 in the final.

== Seeds ==
1. (Argentina) Marco Trungelliti (semifinals)
2. (France) Calvin Hemery (final)
3. (United Kingdom) Jan Choinski (champion)
4. (Kazakhstan) Timofey Skatov (first round)
5. (France) Clément Tabur (first round)
6. (Brazil) João Lucas Reis da Silva (first round)
7. Marat Sharipov (first round)
8. (Italy) Lorenzo Giustino (first round)

== Draw ==
Key

- Q = Qualifier
- WC = Wild card
- LL = Lucky loser
- Alt = Alternate
- ITF = ITF entry
- PR = Protected ranking
- SR = Special ranking
- SE = Special exempt
- JE = Junior exempt
- JR = Junior Accelerator Programme entrant
- CO = College Accelerator Programme entrant
- NG = Next Gen Accelerator Program entrant
- w/o = Walkover
- r = Retired
- d = Defaulted

=== Finals ===
Semifinals
1	(Argentina) Marco Trungelliti	4	6	4
3	(United Kingdom) Jan Choinski	6	4	6
(Italy) Jacopo Berrettini	5	4
2	(France) Calvin Hemery	7	6

Final
3	(United Kingdom) Jan Choinski	6	6^{4}	6
2	(France) Calvin Hemery	4	7^{7}	2

=== Top half ===
First round
1	(Argentina) M Trungelliti	4	6	6
Alt	(France) F Bax	6	1	4
(France) M Martineau	6	6
WC	(France) B Paire	2	2
(Spain) N Sánchez Izquierdo	6	1	7^{7}
(Poland) D Michalski	3	6	6^{1}
Q	(France) Cosme Rolland de Ravel	3	6	6
6	(Brazil) JL Reis da Silva	6	4	4
3	(United Kingdom) J Choinski	7^{7}	6
WC	(France) T Papamalamis	6^{5}	3
Q	(Serbia) B Djuric	6	6
(France) C Denolly	3	3
(France) A Géa	2	6	6
(France) G Barrère	6	0	1
Q	(France) H Mayot	4	7^{7}	6
5	(France) C Tabur	6	6^{0}	3

Second round
1	(Argentina) M Trungelliti	2	6	6
(France) M Martineau	6	3	3
(Spain) N Sánchez Izquierdo	6	6
Q	(France) C Rolland de Ravel	2	4
3	(United Kingdom) J Choinski	6	7
Q	(Serbia) B Djuric	3	5
(France) A Géa	3	6	4
Q	(France) H Mayot	6	0	6

Quarterfinals
1	(Argentina) M Trungelliti	7^{7}	6
(Spain) N Sánchez Izquierdo	6^{4}	4
3	(United Kingdom) J Choinski	6	6
Q	(France) H Mayot	2	3

Semifinals
1	(Argentina) M Trungelliti	4	6	4
3	(United Kingdom) J Choinski	6	4	6

=== Bottom half ===
First round
8	(Italy) L Giustino	5	0
Q	(France) T Lamasine	7	6
Q	(Netherlands) N Visker	1	3
(Slovakia) N Gombos	6	6
(Italy) J Berrettini	7^{7}	7^{7}
(Germany) M Rosenkranz	6^{2}	6^{3}
WC	(France) T Faurel	6	4	6
4	(Kazakhstan) T Skatov	2	6	0
7	M Sharipov	2	5
(Spain) J Barranco Cosano	6	7
(United States) T Zink	2	5
(Netherlands) J Sels	6	7
Q	(Sweden) M Ymer	6	4	0^{r}
(Switzerland) M Brunold	4	6	3
PR	(North Macedonia) K Ivanovski	6^{6}	4
2	(France) C Hemery	7^{8}	6

Second round
Q	(France) T Lamasine	4	6	4
(Slovakia) N Gombos	6	3	6
(Italy) J Berrettini	4	6	6
WC	(France) T Faurel	6	4	3
(Spain) J Barranco Cosano	6	6
(Netherlands) J Sels	3	3
(Switzerland) M Brunold	2	6	3
2	(France) C Hemery	6	0	6

Quarterfinals
(Slovakia) N Gombos	3	6^{5}
(Italy) J Berrettini	6	7^{7}
(Spain) J Barranco Cosano	3	3
2	(France) C Hemery	6	6

Semifinals
(Italy) J Berrettini	5	4
2	(France) C Hemery	7	6
