= 2021 Saint-Tropez Open – Doubles =

Doubles
- 2021 Saint-Tropez Open

Final
- Champions: (Croatia) Antonio Šančić (New Zealand) Artem Sitak
- Runners-up: (Monaco) Romain Arneodo (France) Manuel Guinard
- Score: 7–6^{(7–5)}, 6–4

Events
Singles	Doubles
- Saint-Tropez Open

This was the first edition of the tournament.

Antonio Šančić and Artem Sitak won the title after defeating Romain Arneodo and Manuel Guinard 7–6^{(7–5)}, 6–4 in the final.

== Seeds ==
1. (Monaco) Romain Arneodo / (France) Manuel Guinard (final)
2. (Croatia) Antonio Šančić / (New Zealand) Artem Sitak (champions)
3. (India) Jeevan Nedunchezhiyan / (India) Purav Raja (quarterfinals)
4. (United States) JC Aragone / (Colombia) Nicolás Barrientos (first round)

== Draw ==
Key

- Q = Qualifier
- WC = Wild card
- LL = Lucky loser
- Alt = Alternate
- ITF = ITF entry
- PR = Protected ranking
- SR = Special ranking
- SE = Special exempt
- JE = Junior exempt
- JR = Junior Accelerator Programme entrant
- CO = College Accelerator Programme entrant
- NG = Next Gen Accelerator Program entrant
- w/o = Walkover
- r = Retired
- d = Defaulted

First round
WC	(United States) Jack Vance (United States) Tennyson Whiting	6	3	[12]
(Romania) VV Cornea (Greece) Pe Tsitsipas	3	6	[10]
4	(United States) JC Aragone (Colombia) N Barrientos	1	4
(France) D Added (Belgium) Z Bergs	6	6
(Uzbekistan) D Istomin (Russia) R Safiullin	6	6
(Romania) A Jecan (Sweden) DN Mădăraș	4	4
(France) H Grenier (France) A Müller	w/o
(France) K Jacquet (France) M Martineau
(France) M Bourgue (France) V Royer	6	2	[5]
3	(India) J Nedunchezhiyan (India) P Raja	4	6	[10]
(Russia) B Bobrov (Chinese Taipei) T-l Wu
WC	(France) M Chazal (France) Louis Tessa	w/o
(Italy) T Fabbiano (Germany) D Masur	6^{3}	2
2	(Croatia) A Šančić (New Zealand) A Sitak	7^{7}	6

Quarterfinals
1	(Monaco) R Arneodo (France) M Guinard	6	6
WC	(United States) Jac Vance (United States) T Whiting	4	4
(France) D Added (Belgium) Z Bergs	2	6	[8]
(Uzbekistan) D Istomin (Russia) R Safiullin	6	4	[10]
(France) H Grenier (France) A Müller	4	6	[10]
3	(India) J Nedunchezhiyan (India) P Raja	6	1	[2]
WC	(France) M Chazal (France) L Tessa	2	4
2	(Croatia) A Šančić (New Zealand) A Sitak	6	6

Semifinals
1	(Monaco) R Arneodo (France) M Guinard	7	7^{7}
(Uzbekistan) D Istomin (Russia) R Safiullin	5	6^{4}
(France) H Grenier (France) A Müller	2	6	[5]
2	(Croatia) A Šančić (New Zealand) A Sitak	6	3	[10]

Final
1	(Monaco) R Arneodo (France) M Guinard	6^{5}	4
2	(Croatia) A Šančić (New Zealand) A Sitak	7^{7}	6
