= 2023 Internationaux de Tennis de Troyes =

- Date: 3 – 9 July
- Edition: 2nd
- Surface: Clay
- Location: Troyes, France

Champions

Singles
- (France) Manuel Guinard

Doubles
- (France) Manuel Guinard / (France) Grégoire Jacq
← 2022 ·	Internationaux de Tennis de Troyes	· 2024 →

The 2023 Internationaux de Tennis de Troyes was a professional tennis tournament played on clay courts. It was the second edition of the tournament which was part of the 2023 ATP Challenger Tour. It took place in Troyes, France from 3 and 9 July 2023.

== Singles main draw entrants ==
=== Seeds ===
Country	Player	Rank^{1}	Seed
ARG	Genaro Alberto Olivieri	178	1
	Evgeny Donskoy	231	2
ARG	Marco Trungelliti	232	3
FRA	Térence Atmane	241	4
ITA	Gianluca Mager	245	5
ITA	Lorenzo Giustino	256	6
~~FRA~~	~~Titouan Droguet~~	~~261~~	~~7~~
LIB	Benjamin Hassan	264	8

- ^{1} Rankings as of 26 June 2023.

=== Other entrants ===
The following players received wildcards into the singles main draw:

- (France) Mathys Erhard
- (France) Sascha Gueymard Wayenburg
- (Spain) Abel Hernández Aguila

The following players received entry from the qualifying draw:

- (Croatia) Duje Ajduković
- (France) Maxence Beaugé
- (France) Manuel Guinard
- (France) Calvin Hemery
- (Spain) David Jordà Sanchis
- (France) Matteo Martineau

The following player received entry as a lucky loser:

- (Georgia (country)) Saba Purtseladze

== Champions ==
=== Singles ===
- (France) Manuel Guinard def. (France) Calvin Hemery 6–4, 6–3.

=== Doubles ===
- (France) Manuel Guinard / (France) Grégoire Jacq def. (Spain) Álvaro López San Martín / (Spain) Daniel Rincón by walkover.
