= 2026 Aspria Tennis Cup – Singles =

Singles
- 2026 Aspria Tennis Cup

Final
- Champion: (Argentina) Facundo Díaz Acosta
- Runner-up: (Italy) Marco Cecchinato
- Score: 6–7^{(0–7)}, 7–6^{(7–5)}, 7–6^{(7–5)}

Events
Singles	Doubles
- Aspria Tennis Cup

Marco Cecchinato was the defending champion but lost in the final to Facundo Díaz Acosta.

Díaz Acosta won the title after defeating Cecchinato 6–7^{(0–7)}, 7–6^{(7–5)}, 7–6^{(7–5)} in the final.

== Seeds ==
1. (Argentina) Francisco Comesaña (quarterfinals)
2. (Georgia (country)) Nikoloz Basilashvili (first round, retired)
3. (Argentina) Facundo Díaz Acosta (champion)
4. (Italy) Stefano Travaglia (first round)
5. (Brazil) Gustavo Heide (semifinals)
6. (Austria) Jurij Rodionov (first round)
7. (Denmark) Elmer Møller (second round)
8. (Bolivia) Juan Carlos Prado Ángelo (first round)

== Draw ==
Key

- Q = Qualifier
- WC = Wild card
- LL = Lucky loser
- Alt = Alternate
- ITF = ITF entry
- PR = Protected ranking
- SR = Special ranking
- SE = Special exempt
- JE = Junior exempt
- JR = Junior Accelerator Programme entrant
- CO = College Accelerator Programme entrant
- NG = Next Gen Accelerator Program entrant
- w/o = Walkover
- r = Retired
- d = Defaulted

=== Finals ===
Semifinals
(Spain) Daniel Rincón	6	4	3
3	(Argentina) Facundo Díaz Acosta	4	6	6
5	(Brazil) Gustavo Heide	1	5
(Italy) Marco Cecchinato	6	7

Final
3	(Argentina) Facundo Díaz Acosta	6^{0}	7^{7}	7^{7}
(Italy) Marco Cecchinato	7^{7}	6^{5}	6^{5}

=== Top half ===
First round
1	(Argentina) F Comesaña	6	6
Q	(Czech Republic) Matthew William Donald	1	2
(Germany) D Dedura	6	6
(Spain) M Damas	3	4
(Spain) D Rincón	6	1
JR	(Italy) J Vasamì	2	0^{r}
Q	(France) Mathys Erhard	6	6
6	(Austria) J Rodionov	3	2
3	(Argentina) F Díaz Acosta	6	6
NG	(Colombia) Miguel Tobón	2	2
(Italy) M Ribecai	6^{4}	4
Q	(Italy) Daniele Rapagnetta	7^{7}	6
JR	(Germany) N McDonald	5	1
WC	(Italy) Juan Cruz Martin Manzano	7	6
(Spain) D Jordà Sanchis	6	7^{7}
8	(Bolivia) JC Prado Ángelo	2	6^{2}

Second round
1	(Argentina) F Comesaña	7^{9}	6^{10}	6
(Germany) D Dedura	6^{7}	7^{12}	0
(Spain) D Rincón	6	7^{7}
Q	(France) M Erhard	4	6^{2}
3	(Argentina) F Díaz Acosta	6	6
Q	(Italy) D Rapagnetta	2	1
WC	(Italy) JC Martin Manzano	6	5	6
(Spain) D Jordà Sanchis	0	7	3

Quarterfinals
1	(Argentina) F Comesaña	4	7	6^{5}
(Spain) D Rincón	6	5	7^{7}
3	(Argentina) F Díaz Acosta	6	6
WC	(Italy) JC Martin Manzano	0	2

Semifinals
(Spain) D Rincón	6	4	3
3	(Argentina) F Díaz Acosta	4	6	6

=== Bottom half ===
First round
5	(Brazil) G Heide	6	6
(Argentina) FA Gómez	4	1
(Argentina) A Barrena	5	6	6
(Bolivia) H Dellien	7	1	4
Alt	(Poland) D Michalski	4	5
(Italy) F Passaro	6	7
Q	(Italy) E Dalla Valle	7^{7}	6
4	(Italy) S Travaglia	6^{3}	1
7	(Denmark) E Møller	7^{11}	6
Q	(Slovakia) N Gombos	6^{9}	1
Q	(Spain) O Roca Batalla	7^{7}	3	1
WC	(Italy) Pierluigi Basile	6^{4}	6	6
WC	(Italy) F Romano	7	2	1
(Italy) M Cecchinato	5	6	6
(Italy) R Brancaccio	6	2
2	(Georgia (country)) N Basilashvili	1	1^{r}

Second round
5	(Brazil) G Heide	6	7^{9}
(Argentina) A Barrena	0	6^{7}
(Italy) F Passaro	2	4
Q	(Italy) E Dalla Valle	6	6
7	(Denmark) E Møller	4	4
WC	(Italy) P Basile	6	6
(Italy) M Cecchinato	6	7^{7}
(Italy) R Brancaccio	2	6^{1}

Quarterfinals
5	(Brazil) G Heide	7^{7}	7^{7}
Q	(Italy) E Dalla Valle	6^{4}	6^{5}
WC	(Italy) P Basile	1	0^{r}
(Italy) M Cecchinato	6	3

Semifinals
5	(Brazil) G Heide	1	5
(Italy) M Cecchinato	6	7
