= 2022 Internationaux de Tennis de Troyes =

- Date: 27 June – 3 July
- Edition: 1st
- Surface: Clay
- Location: Troyes, France

Champions

Singles
- (Argentina) Juan Bautista Torres

Doubles
- (Spain) Íñigo Cervantes / (Spain) Oriol Roca Batalla
Internationaux de Tennis de Troyes	· 2023 →

The 2022 Internationaux de Tennis de Troyes was a professional tennis tournament played on clay courts. It was the first edition of the tournament which was part of the 2022 ATP Challenger Tour. It took place in Troyes, France between 27 June and 3 July 2022. The first edition was originally supposed to be held in 2020 but was canceled due to the COVID-19 pandemic.

== Singles main draw entrants ==
=== Seeds ===
Country	Player	Rank^{1}	Seed
CRO	Nino Serdarušić	170	1
ARG	Thiago Agustín Tirante	197	2
ARG	Genaro Alberto Olivieri	217	3
KAZ	Timofey Skatov	225	4
	Evgeny Karlovskiy	238	5
SUI	Johan Nikles	260	6
BEL	Michael Geerts	262	7
POL	Daniel Michalski	268	8

- ^{1} Rankings as of 20 June 2022.

=== Other entrants ===
The following players received wildcards into the singles main draw:

- (France) Arthur Fils
- (Spain) Abel Hernández Aguila
- (France) Luca Van Assche

The following player received entry into the singles main draw using a protected ranking:

- (Belgium) Joris De Loore

The following players received entry into the singles main draw as alternates:

- (Brazil) Pedro Boscardin Dias
- (France) Tristan Lamasine

The following players received entry from the qualifying draw:

- (Bulgaria) Adrian Andreev
- Andrey Chepelev
- (Italy) Francesco Maestrelli
- (France) Matteo Martineau
- (Switzerland) Jakub Paul
- (France) Clément Tabur

== Champions ==
=== Singles ===
- (Argentina) Juan Bautista Torres def. (Lebanon) Benjamin Hassan 7–6^{(7–2)}, 6–2.

=== Doubles ===
- (Spain) Íñigo Cervantes / (Spain) Oriol Roca Batalla def. (Argentina) Thiago Agustín Tirante / (Argentina) Juan Bautista Torres 6–1, 6–2.
