= 2023 Internationaux de Tennis de Troyes – Doubles =

Doubles
- 2023 Internationaux de Tennis de Troyes

Final
- Champions: (France) Manuel Guinard (France) Grégoire Jacq
- Runners-up: (Spain) Álvaro López San Martín (Spain) Daniel Rincón
- Score: Walkover

Events
Singles	Doubles
- Internationaux de Tennis de Troyes

Íñigo Cervantes and Oriol Roca Batalla were the defending champions but chose not to defend their title.

Manuel Guinard and Grégoire Jacq won the title after Álvaro López San Martín and Daniel Rincón withdrew before the final.

== Seeds ==
1. (France) Manuel Guinard / (France) Grégoire Jacq (champions)
2. (Bolivia) Murkel Dellien / (Brazil) Daniel Dutra da Silva (quarterfinals)
3. (France) Constantin Bittoun Kouzmine / (India) Parikshit Somani (semifinals)
4. (United States) George Goldhoff / (United States) Tyler Zink (first round, withdrew)

== Draw ==
Key

- Q = Qualifier
- WC = Wild card
- LL = Lucky loser
- Alt = Alternate
- ITF = ITF entry
- PR = Protected ranking
- SR = Special ranking
- SE = Special exempt
- JE = Junior exempt
- JR = Junior Accelerator Programme entrant
- CO = College Accelerator Programme entrant
- NG = Next Gen Accelerator Program entrant
- w/o = Walkover
- r = Retired
- d = Defaulted

First round
(Argentina) V Aboian (Argentina) G Villanueva	7^{7}	3	[5]
(Canada) S Diez (Norway) V Durasovic	6^{1}	6	[10]
3	(France) C Bittoun Kouzmine (India) Parikshit Somani	5
(Serbia) N Milojević (Ukraine) V Uzhylovskyi	2^{r}
Alt	(Italy) Facundo Juárez (Georgia (country)) S Purtseladze	7	6
WC	(France) Samy Chkiri (France) Julien Evrard	5	1
(Spain) A Moro Cañas (Argentina) M Trungelliti	w/o
4	(United States) G Goldhoff (United States) T Zink
WC	(France) Augustin Damonte (France) Lancelot Erler	0	2
(Spain) Á López San Martín (Spain) D Rincón	6	6
(Spain) P Martín Tiffon (Spain) N Sánchez Izquierdo	3	2
2	(Bolivia) M Dellien (Brazil) D Dutra da Silva	6	6

Quarterfinals
1	(France) M Guinard (France) G Jacq	7	6
(Canada) S Diez (Norway) V Durasovic	5	1
3	(France) C Bittoun Kouzmine (India) P Somani	2	6	[10]
(Germany) Lucas Gerch (Lebanon) B Hassan	6	1	[7]
Alt	(Italy) F Juárez (Georgia (country)) S Purtseladze	2	4
(Spain) A Moro Cañas (Argentina) M Trungelliti	6	6
(Spain) Á López San Martín (Spain) D Rincón	6	6
2	(Bolivia) M Dellien (Brazil) D Dutra da Silva	4	2

Semifinals
1	(France) M Guinard (France) G Jacq	6	6^{4}	[10]
3	(France) C Bittoun Kouzmine (India) P Somani	4	7^{7}	[4]
(Spain) A Moro Cañas (Argentina) M Trungelliti	6^{1}	1
(Spain) Á López San Martín (Spain) D Rincón	7^{7}	6

Final
1	(France) M Guinard (France) G Jacq	w/o
(Spain) Á López San Martín (Spain) D Rincón
