= 2026 Aspria Tennis Cup =

- Date: 29 June – 5 July
- Edition: 20th
- Surface: Clay
- Location: Milan, Italy

Champions

Singles
- (Argentina) Facundo Díaz Acosta

Doubles
- (Italy) Francesco Forti / (Italy) Filippo Romano
- Aspria Tennis Cup

The 2026 Aspria Tennis Cup Trofeo BCS was a professional tennis tournament played on clay courts. It was the 20th edition of the tournament which was part of the 2026 ATP Challenger Tour. It took place in Milan, Italy between 29 June and 5 July 2026.

== Singles main-draw entrants ==
=== Seeds ===
Country	Player	Rank^{1}	Seed
ARG	Francisco Comesaña	90	1
GEO	Nikoloz Basilashvili	112	2
ARG	Facundo Díaz Acosta	120	3
ITA	Stefano Travaglia	130	4
BRA	Gustavo Heide	138	5
AUT	Jurij Rodionov	139	6
DEN	Elmer Møller	149	7
BOL	Juan Carlos Prado Ángelo	156	8

- ^{1} Rankings are as of 22 June 2026.

=== Other entrants ===
The following players received wildcards into the singles main draw:

- (Italy) Pierluigi Basile
- (Italy) Juan Cruz Martin Manzano
- (Italy) Filippo Romano

The following players received entry into the singles main draw through the Junior Accelerator programme:

- (Germany) Niels McDonald
- (Italy) Jacopo Vasamì

The following player received entry into the singles main draw through the Next Gen Accelerator programme:

- (Colombia) Miguel Tobón

The following player received entry into the singles main draw as an alternate:

- (Poland) Daniel Michalski

The following players received entry from the qualifying draw:

- (Italy) Enrico Dalla Valle
- (Czech Republic) Matthew William Donald
- (France) Mathys Erhard
- (Slovakia) Norbert Gombos
- (Italy) Daniele Rapagnetta
- (Spain) Oriol Roca Batalla

== Champions ==
=== Singles ===
- (Argentina) Facundo Díaz Acosta def. (Italy) Marco Cecchinato 6–7^{(0–7)}, 7–6^{(7–5)}, 7–6^{(7–5)}.

=== Doubles ===
- (Italy) Francesco Forti / (Italy) Filippo Romano def. (India) Siddhant Banthia / (India) Arjun Kadhe 6–3, 7–6^{(7–5)}.
