= Marvin Möller =

German tennis player

- ITF name: Marvin Moeller
- Country (sports): Germany
- Residence: Hamburg, Germany
- Born: 18 January 1999 (age 27) Hamburg, Germany
- Height: 1.78 m (5 ft 10 in)
- Plays: Right-handed (two handed-backhand)
- Prize money: US $227,230

Singles
- Career record: 0–1
- Career titles: 0
- Highest ranking: No. 206 (16 November 2026)
- Current ranking: No. 206 (16 November 2026)

Doubles
- Career record: 0–2
- Career titles: 0
- Highest ranking: No. 618 (14 January 2019)
- Last updated on: 16 November 2026.

Marvin Möller (born 18 January 1999) is a German tennis player. He has a career high ATP singles ranking of world No. 206 achieved on 16 November 2026 and a doubles ranking of No. 618 achieved on 14 January 2019.

== Career ==
=== 2016: Juniors, ATP debut ===
On the junior tour, Möller has a career high ITF junior ranking of world No. 9, achieved in January 2017. He reached the quarterfinals of the 2016 French Open boys' singles event as a qualifier.

Möller made his ATP main draw debut at the 2016 German Open.

=== 2023-2026: Maiden Challenger title, Top 250 ===
In September 2023, following a quarterfinal showing at the new Bad Waltersdorf Challenger, he equalled his best ranking of No. 370 by a spot shy, climbing more than 60 positions, on 25 September 2023. He later reached a new career high singles ranking of No. 301 on 27 November 2023. In September 2024, playing with Ben Jones, Möller won the doubles title at the ITF tournament in Växjö, Sweden.

At the 2026 Internationaux de Tennis de Troyes Möller won his maiden Challenger title after defeating Kilian Feldbausch 7–6^{(7–5)}, 6–3 in the final.

== ATP Challenger finals ==
=== Singles: 3 (1 title, 2 runner-ups) ===
Finals by surface
Hard (0–1)
Clay (1–1)

Result	W–L	Date	Tournament	Surface	Opponent	Score
Win	1–0	Jul 2026	Internationaux de Tennis de Troyes, France	Clay	(Switzerland) Kilian Feldbausch	7–6^{(7–5)}, 6–3
Loss	1–1	Aug 2026	Hamburg Ladies & Gents Cup, Germany	Clay	(Czech Republic) Jan Kumstát	6–4, 6–7^{(5–7)}, 5–7
Loss	1–2	Nov 2026	Monastir Open, Tunisia	Hard	(Switzerland) Kilian Feldbausch	1–6, 2–6

== ITF Futures/World Tennis Tour finals ==
=== Singles: 20 (9–11) ===
Finals by surface
Hard (6–4)
Clay (2–5)
Carpet (1–2)

Result	W–L	Date	Tournament	Surface	Opponent	Score
Win	1–0	Oct 2017	Bad Salzdetfurth, Germany	Carpet (i)	(Russia) Evgeny Karlovskiy	6–3, 5–7, 7–5
Loss	1–1	Nov 2017	Říčany, Czech Republic	Hard (i)	(Czech Republic) Marek Jaloviec	6–7^{(4–7)}, 2–6
Loss	1–2	Feb 2018	Kaarst, Germany	Carpet (i)	(Netherlands) Igor Sijsling	2–6, 6–7^{(2–7)}
Loss	1–3	Jun 2018	Kaltenkirchen, Germany	Clay	(Bulgaria) Dimitar Kuzmanov	2–6, 3–6
Loss	1–4	Nov 2021	M15 Opava, Czech Republic	Carpet (i)	(Czech Republic) David Poljak	3–6, 6–7^{(5–7)}
Loss	1–5	Nov 2021	M15 Ostrava, Czech Republic	Hard (i)	(Czech Republic) Andrew Paulson	3–6, 6–7^{(6–8)}
Win	2–5	Feb 2022	M15 Oberhaching, Germany	Hard (i)	(France) Sascha Gueymard Wayenburg	6–3, 4–6, 7–5
Win	3–5	Mar 2022	M25 Trento, Italy	Hard (i)	(Czech Republic) Petr Nouza	6–3, 6–4
Win	4–5	Mar 2023	M15 Créteil, France	Hard (i)	(France) Tristan Lamasine	6–2, 6–0
Loss	4–6	Jul 2023	M15 Sofia, Bulgaria	Clay	(Portugal) Gonçalo Oliveira	3–6, 1–6
Loss	4–7	Jul 2023	M25 Uriage, France	Clay	(France) Ugo Blanchet	3–6, 4–6
Win	5–7	Aug 2023	M25 Ystad, Sweden	Clay	(Monaco) Valentin Vacherot	2–6, 6–3, 7–5
Win	6–7	Oct 2023	M25 Nevers, France	Hard (i)	(France) Sascha Gueymard Wayenburg	2–6, 7–6^{(7–4)}, 6–4
Loss	6–8	May 2024	M25 Värnamo, Sweden	Clay	(Italy) Edoardo Lavagno	2–6, 6–3, 3–6
Win	7–8	Sep 2024	M15 Växjö, Sweden	Hard (i)	(Sweden) Lucas Renard	6–4, 6–4
Loss	7–9	Feb 2025	M15 Oberhaching, Germany	Hard (i)	(Germany) Mats Rosenkranz	1–6, 2–6
Win	8–9	Jun 2025	M25 Brussels, Belgium	Clay	(France) Enzo Couacaud	walkover
Loss	8–10	Jul 2025	M15 Amstelveen, Netherlands	Clay	(France) Lilian Marmousez	3–6, 4–6
Loss	8–11	Feb 2026	M15 Oberhaching, Germany	Hard (i)	(United Kingdom) Paul Jubb	2–6, 0–6
Win	9–11	Mar 2026	M25 Créteil, France	Hard (i)	(United Kingdom) Charles Broom	6–3, 6–2

=== Doubles: 5 (2–3) ===
Finals by surface
Hard (2–2)
Clay (0–0)
Carpet (0–1)

Result	W–L	Date	Tournament	Surface	Partner	Opponents	Score
Loss	0–1	Oct 2016	Bad Salzdetfurth, Germany	Carpet (i)	(Germany) Tim Rühl	(Germany) Andreas Mies (Germany) Oscar Otte	7–6^{(7–3)}, 4–6, [7–10]
Loss	0–2	Nov 2016	Leimen, Germany	Hard (i)	(Germany) Tim Rühl	(Poland) Aleksander Charpantidis (Poland) Hubert Hurkacz	1–6, 3–6
Win	1–2	Oct 2017	Hamburg, Germany	Hard (i)	(France) Dan Added	(Turkey) Altuğ Çelikbilek (Turkey) Anıl Yüksel	6–7^{(3–7)}, 7–6^{(7–4)}, [10–2]
Loss	1–3	Sep 2021	M25 Jönköping, Sweden	Hard (i)	(Poland) Michal Dembek	(Japan) Yuta Shimizu (Uzbekistan) Khumoyun Sultanov	4–6, 6–4, [6–10]
Win	2–3	Sep 2024	M15 Växjö, Sweden	Hard (i)	(United Kingdom) Ben Jones	(United States) Phillip Jordan (United States) Karl Poling	1–6, 6–2, [10–7]
