= Tim Rühl =

German tennis player (born 1998)

- Country (sports): Germany
- Born: 31 March 1998 (age 28) Waldshut-Tiengen, Germany
- Height: 1.83 m (6 ft 0 in)
- Plays: Right-handed (two-handed backhand)
- College: Arizona State, TCU
- Prize money: US $66,581

Singles
- Career record: 0–0 (at ATP Tour level, Grand Slam level, and in Davis Cup)
- Career titles: 0
- Highest ranking: No. 962 (21 October 2024)

Doubles
- Career record: 0–1 (at ATP Tour level, Grand Slam level, and in Davis Cup)
- Career titles: 3 Challenger, 13 ITF
- Highest ranking: No. 120 (22 June 2026)
- Current ranking: No. 120 (22 June 2026)
- Last updated on: 22 June 2026.

Tim Rühl (born 31 March 1998) is a German tennis player who specializes in doubles. He has a career-high ATP doubles ranking of world No. 120 achieved on 22 June 2026 and a singles ranking of No. 962 achieved on 21 October 2024.

He won his maiden ATP Challenger doubles title at the 2025 Dutch Open.

Rühl played college tennis at Arizona State before transferring to TCU.

== ATP Challenger finals ==
=== Doubles: 8 (3 titles, 5 runner-ups) ===
Finals by surface
Hard (2–1)
Clay (1–4)

Result	W–L	Date	Tournament	Surface	Partner	Opponents	Score
Loss	0–1	Jul 2025	Internationaux de Troyes, France	Clay	(Czech Republic) David Poljak	(Spain) Mario Mansilla Díez (Spain) Bruno Pujol Navarro	6–7^{(3–7)}, 6–7^{(2–7)}
Win	1–1	Jul 2025	Dutch Open, Netherlands	Clay	(Belgium) Michael Geerts	(Netherlands) Mats Hermans (Netherlands) Mick Veldheer	7–5, 7–6^{(7–4)}
Loss	1–2	Aug 2025	Bonn Open, Germany	Clay	(Germany) Patrick Zahraj	(Austria) Neil Oberleitner (Netherlands) Mick Veldheer	6–4, 6–7^{(3–7)}, [10–12]
Win	2–2	Oct 2025	Hamburg Ladies & Gents Cup, Germany	Hard (i)	(Belgium) Michael Geerts	(Slovakia) Miloš Karol (Finland) Patrik Niklas-Salminen	7–6^{(8–6)}, 7–5
Win	3–2	Nov 2025	Charlottesville Challenger, United States	Hard (i)	(Germany) Patrick Zahraj	(Canada) Justin Boulais (United States) Mac Kiger	3–6, 7–5, [12–10]
Loss	3–3	Nov 2025	Trofeo Faip–Perrel, Italy	Hard (i)	(Czech Republic) David Poljak	(United Kingdom) Joshua Paris (United Kingdom) Marcus Willis	6–7^{(3–7)}, 4–6
Loss	3–4	Mar 2026	Napoli Tennis Cup, Italy	Clay	(Netherlands) Mick Veldheer	(Switzerland) Jakub Paul (Czech Republic) Matěj Vocel	2–6, 4–6
Loss	3–5	Jun 2026	Neckarcup 2.0, Germany	Clay	(Netherlands) Mick Veldheer	(Chinese Taipei) Jason Jung (Japan) Kaito Uesugi	6–7^{(4–7)}, 6–2, [10–12]
