= Juan Bautista Torres =

Argentine tennis player (born 2002)

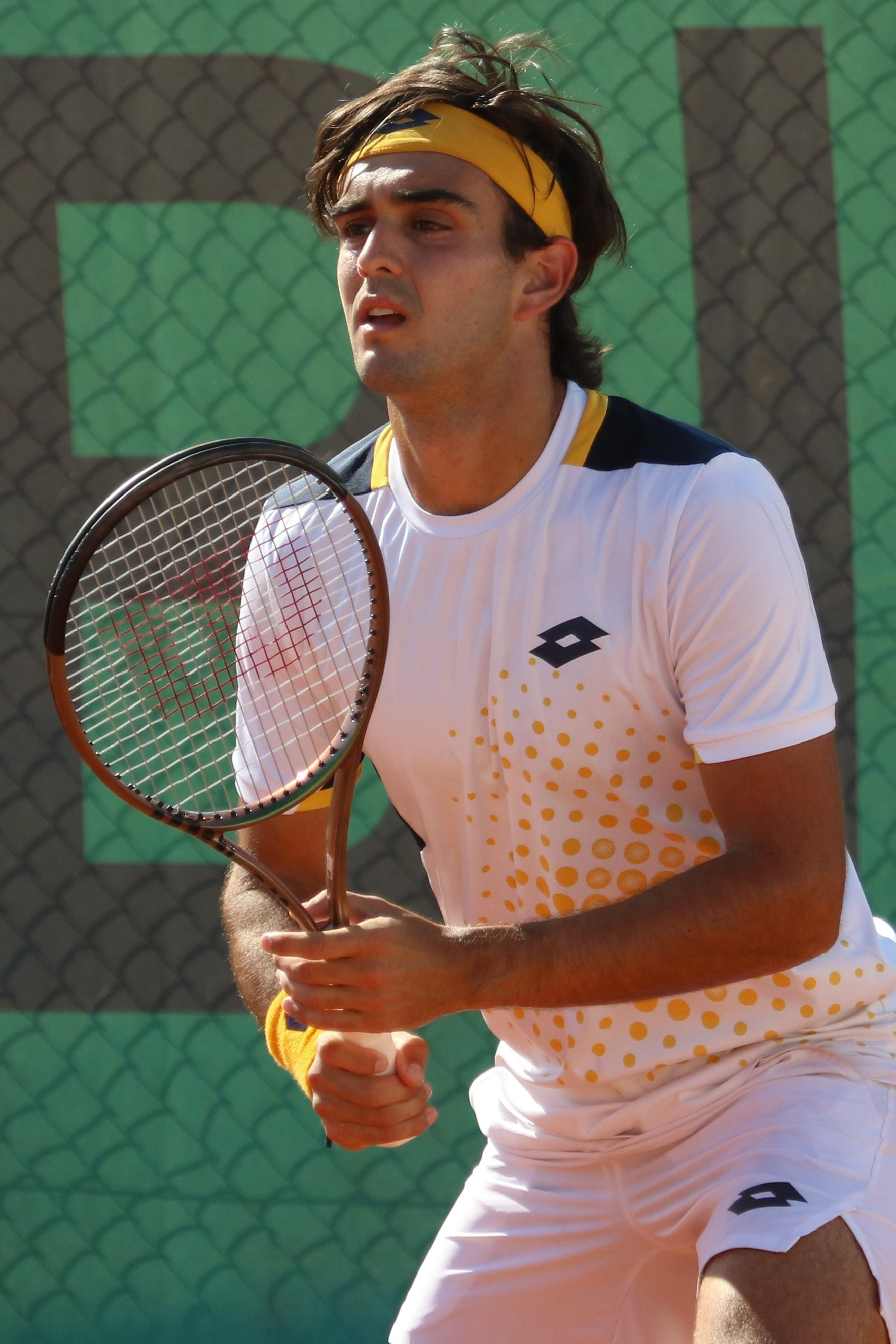
- Torres at the 2022 Internationaux de Blois
- Country (sports): Argentina
- Residence: Buenos Aires, Argentina
- Born: 2 April 2002 (age 24) Buenos Aires, Argentina
- Height: 1.78 m (5 ft 10 in)
- Plays: Right-handed (two-handed backhand)
- Coach: Mauro Aprile, Sebastián Gutiérrez
- Prize money: US $218,716

Singles
- Career record: 0–0
- Career titles: 0; 2 Challenger
- Highest ranking: No. 226 (1 August 2022)
- Current ranking: No. 324 (6 April 2026)

Grand Slam singles results
- US Open: Q1 (2022)

Doubles
- Career record: 0–2
- Career titles: 0; 1 Challenger
- Highest ranking: No. 262 (3 October 2022)
- Current ranking: No. 1,206 (6 April 2026)
- Last updated on: 6 April 2026.

Juan Bautista Torres (born 2 April 2002) is an Argentine professional tennis player. He has a career-high ATP singles ranking of No. 226 achieved on 1 August 2022 and a doubles ranking of No. 262, reached on 3 October 2022.

== Junior career ==
Torres had mixed results on the ITF junior circuit, maintaining a 54–40 singles win-loss record. In October 2018, he won the "Argentina Juniors Cup" in the boys' doubles category, playing alongside Luciano Darderi. The pair defeated fifth seeds Santiago de la Fuente and Román Andrés Burruchaga in the final.

In June 2019, Torres played the junior events at French Open. In the boys' singles, he lost to seventh seed and eventual champion Holger Rune in the second round. Partnering with Pablo Llamas Ruiz, he reached the quarterfinals in the doubles. The pair lost to eight seeds Sergey Fomin and Gauthier Onclin.

In October 2020, Torres had his best performance at a major jr. tournament, again in Paris – he reached the semifinals in singles, losing to eventual champion Dominic Stricker. In the boys' doubles, he partnered again with Llamas Ruiz – the pair lost in the second round to third seeds and future champions Stricker and Flavio Cobolli.

He reached an ITF junior combined ranking of No. 13 on 12 October 2020.

== Professional career ==
In October 2021, Torres won his maiden ATP Challenger title – in the doubles event – at the Buenos Aires Challenger, partnering with friend Luciano Darderi.

In June 2022, Torres won his first Challenger trophy in singles, at the Internationaux de Troyes, France. He defeated Benjamin Hassan in the final. At the same tournament, he was a runner-up in the doubles category, with compatriot Thiago Agustín Tirante. The pair lost to fourth seeds Íñigo Cervantes and Oriol Roca Batalla in straight sets.

In August 2024, the Argentine earned his second singles title at Challenger-level – at the inaugural Dobrich Challenger, Bulgaria.

== ATP Challenger Tour finals ==
=== Singles: 3 (2 titles, 1 runner-up) ===
Legend ATP Challenger Tour (2–1)

Result	W–L	Date	Tournament	Tier	Surface	Opponent	Score
Loss	0–1	Jan 2022	Aberto de Santa Catarina, Brazil	Challenger	Clay	(Brazil) Igor Marcondes	6–3, 5–7, 1–6
Win	1–1	Jun 2022	Internationaux de Troyes, France	Challenger	Clay	(Lebanon) Benjamin Hassan	7–6^{(7–2)}, 6–2
Win	2–1	Aug 2024	Izida Cup – Dobrich, Bulgaria	Challenger	Clay	Ivan Gakhov	5–7, 6–0, 7–5

=== Doubles: 3 (1 title, 2 runner-ups) ===
Legend ATP Challenger Tour (1–2)

Result	W–L	Date	Tournament	Tier	Surface	Partner	Opponents	Score
Win	1–0	Oct 2021	Buenos Aires Challenger, Argentina	Challenger	Clay	(Italy) Luciano Darderi	(Argentina) Hernán Casanova (Argentina) Santiago Rodríguez Taverna	7–6^{(7–5)}, 7–6^{(12–10)}
Loss	1–1	Apr 2022	Challenger de Tigre II, Argentina	Challenger	Clay	(Italy) Luciano Darderi	(Argentina) Guillermo Durán (Brazil) Felipe Meligeni Alves	6–3, 4–6, [3–10]
Loss	1–2	Jun 2022	Internationaux de Troyes, France	Challenger	Clay	(Argentina) Thiago Agustín Tirante	(Spain) Íñigo Cervantes (Spain) Oriol Roca Batalla	1–6, 2–6

== ITF World Tennis Tour finals ==
=== Singles: 6 (5 titles, 1 runner-up) ===
Legend ITF WTT (5–1)	Finals by surface Hard (–) Clay (5–1)

Result	W–L	Date	Tournament	Tier	Surface	Opponent	Score
Win	1–0	Dec 2020	M15 Cairo, Egypt	WTT	Clay	(United States) Toby Kodat	6–3, 6–3
Win	2–0	Aug 2021	M15 Cairo, Egypt	WTT	Clay	(Argentina) Alejo Lorenzo Lingua Lavallén	1–6, 6–1, 7–5
Win	3–0	Nov 2021	M15 Córdoba, Argentina	WTT	Clay	(Argentina) Francisco Comesaña	6–2, 6–2
Loss	3–1	Dec 2021	M25 Río Cuarto, Argentina	WTT	Clay	(Argentina) Santiago Rodríguez Taverna	2–6, 6–7^{(7–9)}
Win	4–1	Aug 2023	M25 Bielsko-Biała, Poland	WTT	Clay	(Czech Republic) Hynek Bartoň	6–4, 7–5
Win	5–1	Sep 2023	M25 Maribor, Slovenia	WTT	Clay	(Czech Republic) Michael Vrbenský	6–4, 7–5

=== Doubles: 3 (3 runner-ups) ===
Legend ITF WTT (0–3)

Result	W–L	Date	Tournament	Tier	Surface	Partner	Opponents	Score
Loss	0–1	Oct 2019	M15 Junín, Argentina	WTT	Clay	(Argentina) Nicolás Bianchi	(Argentina) Santiago Besada (Argentina) Francisco Comesaña	2–6, 4–6
Loss	0–2	Apr 2021	M15 Córdoba, Argentina	WTT	Clay	(Argentina) Santiago de la Fuente	(Argentina) Gabriel Alejandro Hidalgo (Argentina) Santiago Rodríguez Taverna	2–6, 6–1, [4–10]
Loss	0–3	Sep 2021	M25 Oviedo, Spain	WTT	Clay	(Chile) Miguel Fernando Pereira	(Brazil) Óscar José Gutierrez (Spain) Carlos López Montagud	6–7^{(5–7)}, 3–6
