= Taranto Tennis Cup =

- 2026 Taranto Tennis Cup

ATP Challenger Tour
- Location: Taranto, Italy
- Category: ATP Challenger Tour
- Surface: Hard

The Taranto Tennis Cup is a professional tennis tournament played on hardcourts. It is currently part of the ATP Challenger Tour. It was first held in Taranto, Italy in 2026.

== Past finals ==
=== Singles ===
Year	Champion	Runner-up	Score
2026	(France) Matteo Martineau	(Switzerland) Kilian Feldbausch	6–3, 6–2

=== Doubles ===
Year	Champions	Runners-up	Score
2026	(Tunisia) Skander Mansouri (Austria) Maximilian Neuchrist	(Spain) Ignasi Forcano (Spain) Rafael Izquierdo Luque	6–4, 7–5
