= Manuel Guinard =

French tennis player (born 1995)

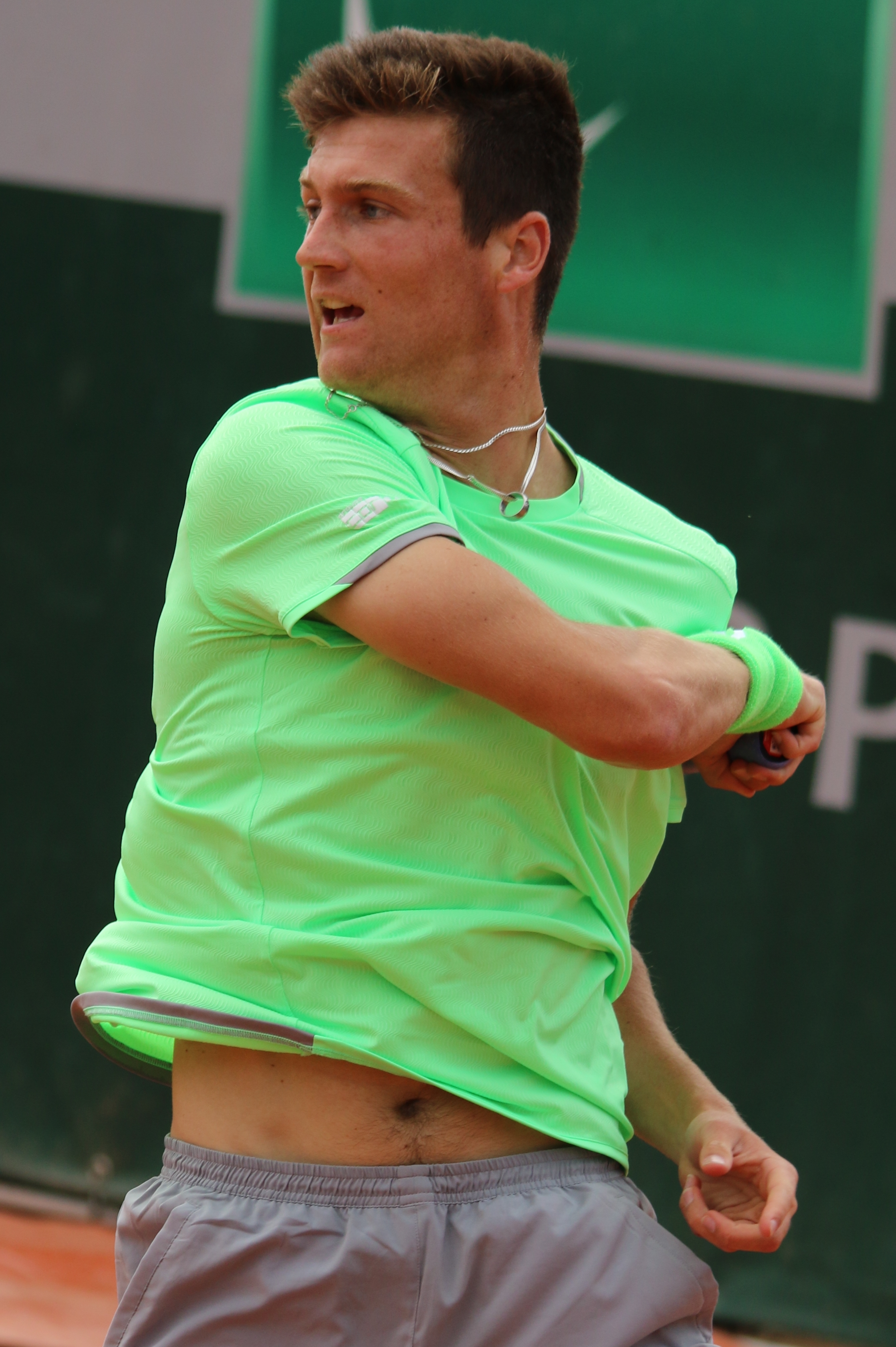
- Country (sports): France
- Born: 15 November 1995 (age 30) Saint-Malo, France
- Height: 1.98 m (6 ft 6 in)
- Turned pro: 2016
- Plays: Right-handed (two-handed backhand)
- Coach: Sébastien Villette
- Prize money: US $1,913,089

Singles
- Career record: 5–8
- Career titles: 0
- Highest ranking: No. 134 (31 October 2022)

Grand Slam singles results
- Australian Open: Q1 (2022, 2023)
- French Open: 1R (2022)
- Wimbledon: Q1 (2022, 2024)
- US Open: Q1 (2022)

Doubles
- Career record: 72–51
- Career titles: 3
- Highest ranking: No. 13 (14 September 2026)
- Current ranking: No. 13 (14 September 2026)

Grand Slam doubles results
- Australian Open: 1R (2025, 2026)
- French Open: 3R (2024)
- Wimbledon: QF (2026)
- US Open: QF (2026)

Grand Slam mixed doubles results
- Australian Open: F (2026)
- French Open: 2R (2026)
- Wimbledon: 1R (2026)
- Last updated on: 14 September 2026.

Manuel Guinard (born 15 November 1995) is a French professional tennis player who specializes in doubles. He has a career-high ATP doubles ranking of world No. 13 achieved on 14 September 2026 and a best singles ranking of No. 134, reached on 31 October 2022.

Guinard has won three ATP Tour doubles titles, including two Masters 1000-level events at the 2025 Monte-Carlo Masters and the 2026 Indian Wells Masters, with Romain Arneodo and Guido Andreozzi, respectively. On the ATP Challenger Tour, he won 15 doubles and two singles titles.

== Early life ==
Born in Saint-Malo, Guinard began playing tennis at the age of 5-6 at the TCJA Saint-Malo under the guidance of his first coach, Olivier Courteau. At 12, he joined a tennis-studies program in Quimperlé, where he trained from 5th to 3rd grade. He later spent four seasons at the French Tennis Academy near Gorron, Mayenne. Driven by his passion for tennis, he aimed to build a career as a professional player, setting long-term goals such as breaking into the Top 100 worldwide. Early international experiences included Futures and Challenger tournaments, where he advanced past qualifiers. Known for his strong serve and forehand, he continued refining his game, particularly in advancing to the net. By 19, Guinard sought to obtain a state diploma (Diplôme d'État en France) to qualify as a tennis coach while simultaneously working on his competitive career. He joined the Tennis Elite Team (TET) project in Saint-Malo, led by Christophe Cazuc, to support his progression on the professional circuit.

== Professional career ==
=== 2019–2020: Major debut and first win in doubles ===
Guinard made his Grand Slam tournament main draw debut at the 2019 French Open after receiving a wildcard for the doubles main draw, partnering Arthur Rinderknech.

At the 2020 French Open he reached the second round for his first Grand Slam tournament win in doubles also as a wildcard partnering Rinderknech.

=== 2021: First Challenger final, Top 250 ===
Guinard made his first Challenger final at the 2021 Open du Pays d'Aix where he lost to Carlos Taberner. He reached the top 250 on 8 November 2021 at world No. 247.

=== 2022: French Open singles debut, Top 150 in singles & doubles ===
Guinard reached a career-high doubles ranking of world No. 155 on 17 January 2022, after winning the 2022 Traralgon International with Zdeněk Kolář. In March, he won his maiden singles 2022 Challenger di Roseto degli Abruzzi II title as an alternate.

In April, Guinard made his ATP debut as a lucky loser at the 2022 Barcelona Open Banc Sabadell, where he lost to Hugo Dellien. He reached a career-high singles ranking of No. 151 on 25 April 2022. In May, Guinard was awarded wildcards into the main draw of the 2022 French Open in singles and doubles partnering Enzo Couacaud.

Guinard qualified for the 2022 ATP Lyon Open main draw and defeated compatriot world No. 68 and wildcard Hugo Gaston in the first round for his first tour-level win. He went on to defeat Michael Mmoh in the next round to reach the quarterfinals for the first time in his career. As a result, he reached the top 150 in the singles rankings.

=== 2023–2024: Two ATP finals in doubles, Challenger titles ===
In July 2023, Guinard won the 2023 Internationaux de Tennis de Troyes as a qualifier, defeating fellow countryman Calvin Hemery in the final. This was Guinard's first final on the ATP Challenger Tour in more than a year, allowing him to return into the Top 300 in the singles rankings. He also won the doubles title at the same tournament.

In six months starting in June 2023, Guinard won four doubles Challenger titles, and then another two in January 2024 (five of the titles won were with Grégoire Jacq). In March 2024, he won one more Challenger in Zadar also with Jacq.

The French pair Guinard/Jacq entered their home Slam, the 2024 French Open as alternates, and on their Major debut as a team, defeated 14th seeded American pair of Nathaniel Lammons and Jackson Withrow in the first round. They reached the third round with a win over Guido Andreozzi and Rinky Hijikata. They lost to the Tsitsipas brothers. As a result, Guinard reached the top 100 at world No. 92 in doubles on 10 June 2024.

Guinard reached his first ATP final with Jacq at the 2024 Swedish Open defeating defending champions and top seeded pair of Aleksandr Nedovyesov and Gonzalo Escobar. They lost to Brazilian duo Rafael Matos and Orlando Luz. The following week the pair reached their second ATP final at the 2024 Croatia Open Umag. Following one more Challenger final in Cassis, France, Guinard reached the top 70 in the doubles rankings on 9 September 2024.

In November 2024, Guinard played his first ATP Tour singles tournament in more than two years by entering the main draw of the 2024 Moselle Open as a lucky loser, losing in the first round to Zizou Bergs.In doubles at the same tournament, he lost with Gregoire Jacq to French duo, compatriots Herbert/Olivetti in the quarterfinals.

=== 2025–2026: Major mixed final, two Masters doubles titles ===
Ranked No. 261, Guinard also entered as a lucky loser the main draw of the 2025 Adelaide International and defeated Roman Safiullin, having entered the tournament as alternate in the qualifying stage. He lost to top seed Tommy Paul in three sets.

In April 2025, Guinard won his maiden ATP Tour title at the 2025 Monte-Carlo Masters partnering Romain Arneodo, as a wildcard pair. They defeated Rohan Bopanna and Ben Shelton in the quarterfinal, and second seeds Harri Heliovaara and Henry Patten in the semifinal. They then defeated seventh seeds Julian Cash and Lloyd Glasspool for the title. It was only the pair's second tournament playing together. As a result, Guinard entered the top 40 on 14 April 2025. In July, Guinard won his second ATP Tour title at the Croatia Open Umag partnering Romain Arneodo. The pair defeated Patrik Trhac and Marcus Willis in the final.

Guinard reached his second Masters 1000 semifinal at the 2025 Rolex Shanghai Masters with new partner Guido Andreozzi as an alternate pair, upsetting second seeds Harri Heliövaara/Henry Patten, but lost to Kevin Krawietz/Tim Puetz. Guinard finished the 2025 season ranked No. 24 on 17 November 2025.

At the 2026 BNP Paribas Open, Guinard won his second Masters title, and biggest of his career, with partner Andreozzi, over top seeds Horacio Zeballos and Marcel Granollers in the semifinals, and Arthur Rinderknech and Valentin Vacherot in the final. It was also Guinard's third ATP Tour title. As a result, he reached the top 15 at world No. 14 in the doubles rankings on 16 March 2026.

== Performance timelines ==
Key
W	F	SF	QF	#R	RR	Q#	DNQ	A	NH

(W) winner; (F) finalist; (SF) semifinalist; (QF) quarterfinalist; (#R) rounds 4, 3, 2, 1; (RR) round-robin stage; (Q#) qualification round; (DNQ) did not qualify; (A) absent; (NH) not held; (SR) strike rate (events won / competed); (W–L) win–loss record.

=== Singles ===
Tournament	2019	2020	2021	2022	2023	2024	SR	W–L	Win%
Australian Open	A	A	A	Q1	Q1	A	0 / 0	0–0	–
French Open	Q3	Q1	Q2	1R	A	Q2	0 / 1	0–1	0%
Wimbledon	A	A	A	Q1	A	Q1	0 / 0	0–0	–
US Open	A	A	A	Q1	A	A	0 / 0	0–0	–
Win–loss	0–0	0–0	0–0	0–1	0–0	0–0	0 / 1	0–1	0%

=== Doubles ===
Current through the 2026 Miami Open.

Tournament	2019	2020	2021	2022	2023	2024	2025	2026	SR	W–L	Win %
Grand Slam tournaments
Australian Open	A	A	A	A	A	A	1R	1R	0 / 2	0–2	0%
French Open	1R	2R	A	2R	A	3R	2R		0 / 5	7–5	58%
Wimbledon	A	NH	A	A	A	A	1R		0 / 1	0–1	0%
US Open	A	A	A	A	A	1R	1R		0 / 2	0–2	0%
Win–loss	0–1	1–1	0–0	1–1	0–0	2–2	1–4	0–1	0 / 10	5–10	33%
ATP Masters 1000
Indian Wells Masters	A	NH	A	A	A	A	A	W	1 / 1	5–0	100%
Miami Open	A	NH	A	A	A	A	A	1R	0 / 1	0–1	0%
Monte Carlo Masters	A	NH	A	A	A	A	W		1 / 1	4–0	100%
Madrid Open	A	NH	A	A	A	A	1R		0 / 1	0–1	0%
Italian Open	A	A	A	A	A	A	1R		0 / 1	0–1	0%
Canadian Open	A	NH	A	A	A	A	A		0 / 0	0–0	–
Cincinnati Masters	A	A	A	A	A	A	A		0 / 0	0–0	–
Shanghai Masters	A	NH			A	A	SF		0 / 1	3–1	75%
Paris Masters	A	A	A	A	A	A	1R		0 / 1	0–1	0%
Win–loss	0–0	0–0	0–0	0–0	0–0	0–0	7–4	5–1	2 / 7	12–5	71%

== Grand Slam finals ==
=== Mixed doubles: 1 (runner-up) ===
Result	Year	Tournament	Surface	Partner	Opponents	Score
Loss	2026	Australian Open	Hard	(France) Kristina Mladenovic	(Australia) Olivia Gadecki (Australia) John Peers	6–4, 3–6, [8–10]

== Other significant finals ==
=== ATP Masters 1000 ===
==== Doubles: 3 (2 titles, 1 runner-up) ====
Result	Year	Tournament	Surface	Partner	Opponents	Score
Win	2025	Monte-Carlo Masters	Clay	(Monaco) Romain Arneodo	(United Kingdom) Julian Cash (United Kingdom) Lloyd Glasspool	1–6, 7–6^{(10–8)}, [10–8]
Win	2026	Indian Wells Open	Hard	(Argentina) Guido Andreozzi	(France) Arthur Rinderknech (Monaco) Valentin Vacherot	7–6^{(7–3)}, 6–3
Loss	2026	Madrid Open	Clay	(Argentina) Guido Andreozzi	(United Kingdom) Henry Patten (Finland) Harri Heliövaara	3–6, 6–3, [7–10]

== ATP Tour finals ==
=== Doubles: 8 (3 titles, 5 runner-ups) ===
Legend Grand Slam (–) ATP 1000 (2–1) ATP 500 (–) ATP 250 (1–4)	Finals by surface Hard (1–1) Clay (2–3) Grass (0–1)	Finals by setting Outdoor (3–4) Indoor (0–1)

Result	W–L	Date	Tournament	Tier	Surface	Partner	Opponents	Score
Loss	0–1	Jul 2024	Swedish Open, Sweden	ATP 250	Clay	(France) Grégoire Jacq	(Brazil) Orlando Luz (Brazil) Rafael Matos	5–7, 4–6
Loss	0–2	Jul 2024	Croatia Open, Croatia	ATP 250	Clay	(France) Grégoire Jacq	(Argentina) Guido Andreozzi (Mexico) Miguel Ángel Reyes-Varela	4–6, 2–6
Win	1–2	Apr 2025	Monte-Carlo Masters, France/Monaco	ATP 1000	Clay	(Monaco) Romain Arneodo	(United Kingdom) Julian Cash (United Kingdom) Lloyd Glasspool	1–6, 7–6^{(10–8)}, [10–8]
Win	2–2	Jul 2025	Croatia Open, Croatia	ATP 250	Clay	(Monaco) Romain Arneodo	(United States) Patrik Trhac (United Kingdom) Marcus Willis	7–5, 7–6^{(7–2)}
Loss	2–3	Nov 2025	Moselle Open, France	ATP 250	Hard (i)	(Argentina) Guido Andreozzi	(France) Quentin Halys (France) Pierre-Hugues Herbert	5–7, 3–6
Win	3–3	Mar 2026	Indian Wells Open, United States	ATP 1000	Hard	(Argentina) Guido Andreozzi	(France) Arthur Rinderknech (Monaco) Valentin Vacherot	7–6^{(7–3)}, 6–3
Loss	3–4	May 2026	Madrid Open, Spain	ATP 1000	Clay	(Argentina) Guido Andreozzi	(Finland) Harri Heliövaara (United Kingdom) Henry Patten	3–6, 6–3, [7–10]
Loss	3–5	Jun 2026	Eastbourne International, United Kingdom	ATP 250	Grass	(Argentina) Guido Andreozzi	(Monaco) Hugo Nys (France) Édouard Roger-Vasselin	3–6, 6–4, [8–10]

== ATP Challenger and ITF Tour finals ==
=== Singles: 15 (11 titles, 4 runner-ups) ===
Legend ATP Challenger Tour (2–2) ITF Futures/WTT (9–2)	Finals by surface Hard (2–2) Clay (9–2)

Result	W–L	Date	Tournament	Tier	Surface	Opponent	Score
Loss	0–1	Jun 2021	Aix-en-Provence, France	Challenger	Clay	(Spain) Carlos Taberner	2–6, 2–6
Win	1–1	Mar 2022	Roseto degli Abruzzi, Italy	Challenger	Clay	(Chinese Taipei) Tseng Chun-hsin	6–1, 6–2
Win	2–1	Jul 2023	Troyes, France	Challenger	Clay	(France) Calvin Hemery	6–3, 6–3
Loss	2–2	Jan 2024	Nonthaburi, Thailand	Challenger	Hard	(Monaco) Valentin Vacherot	5–7, 6–7^{(4–7)}
Win	1–0	May 2018	Bosnia & Herzegovina F1, Doboj	Futures	Clay	(Bosnia and Herzegovina) Nerman Fatić	6–3, 6–4
Loss	1–1	May 2018	Sweden F3, Lund	Futures	Clay	(United States) Alexander Ritschard	3–6, 3–6
Win	2–1	Sep 2018	Netherlands F5, Rotterdam	Futures	Clay	(Slovenia) Nik Razboršek	6–4, 7–6^{(7–3)}
Win	3–1	Dec 2018	Tunisia F44, Monastir	Futures	Hard	(Tunisia) Aziz Dougaz	7–5, 6–4
Loss	3–2	Mar 2019	M15 Quinta Do Lago, Portugal	WTT	Hard	(United Kingdom) Evan Hoyt	4–6, 3–6
Win	4–2	Jun 2019	M25 Pardubice, Czech Republic	WTT	Clay	(Slovakia) Lukas Klein	6–4, 5–7, 7–6^{(8–6)}
Win	5–2	Nov 2019	M15 Prague, Czech Republic	WTT	Hard (i)	(Czech Republic) Michael Vrbenský	7–6^{(7–3)}, 6–3
Win	6–2	Dec 2019	M15 Cairo II, Egypt	WTT	Clay	(Lithuania) Laurynas Grigelis	6–3, 6–2
Win	7–2	Aug 2020	M25 Vogau, Austria	WTT	Clay	(Bulgaria) Dimitar Kuzmanov	6–3, 6–3
Win	8–2	Apr 2021	M25 Angers, France	WTT	Clay	(Monaco) Lucas Catarina	7–5, 6–4
Win	9–2	May 2021	M25 Prague, Czech Republic	WTT	Clay	(United Kingdom) Jack Draper	6–4, 6–3

=== Doubles: 30 (22 titles, 8 runner-ups) ===
Legend ATP Challenger Tour (15–6) ITF Futures (7–2)	Finals by surface Hard (5–3) Clay (17–5)

Result	W–L	Date	Tournament	Tier	Surface	Partner	Opponents	Score
Loss	0–1	May 2019	Savannah, United States	Challenger	Clay	(France) Arthur Rinderknech	(Venezuela) Roberto Maytín (Brazil) Fernando Romboli	7–6^{(7–5)}, 4–6, [9–11]
Win	1–1	Feb 2020	Drummondville, Canada	Challenger	Hard	(France) Arthur Rinderknech	(Dominican Republic) Roberto Cid Subervi (Portugal) Gonçalo Oliveira	7–6^{(7–4)}, 7–6^{(7–3)}
Win	2–1	Mar 2021	Las Palmas, Spain	Challenger	Clay	(France) Enzo Couacaud	(Spain) Javier Barranco Cosano (Spain) Eduard Esteve Lobato	6-1, 6-4
Win	3–1	Jul 2021	Amersfoort, Netherlands	Challenger	Clay	(Switzerland) Luca Castelnuovo	(Peru) Sergio Galdós (Portugal) Gonçalo Oliveira	0–6, 6–4, [11–9]
Loss	3–2	Sep 2021	Saint-Tropez, France	Challenger	Hard	(Monaco) Romain Arneodo	(Serbia) Antonio Šančić (New Zealand) Artem Sitak	6–7^{(5–7)}, 4–6
Win	4–2	Jan 2022	Traralgon, Australia	Challenger	Hard	(Czech Republic) Zdeněk Kolář	(Switzerland) Marc-Andrea Hüsler (Switzerland) Dominic Stricker	6-3, 6-4
Win	5–2	Mar 2022	Roseto degli Abruzzi, Italy	Challenger	Clay	(Italy) Franco Agamenone	(Serbia) Ivan Sabanov (Serbia) Matej Sabanov	7–6^{(7–2)}, 7–6^{(7–3)}
Loss	5–3	Mar 2022	Zadar, Croatia	Challenger	Clay	(Italy) Franco Agamenone	(Czech Republic) Zdeněk Kolář (Italy) Andrea Vavassori	6–3, 6–7^{(7–9)}, [6–10]
Win	6–3	Mar 2023	Zadar, Croatia	Challenger	Clay	(Croatia) Nino Serdarušić	(Serbia) Ivan Sabanov (Serbia) Matej Sabanov	6–4, 6–0
Loss	6–4	Jun 2023	Troisdorf, Germany	Challenger	Clay	(France) Grégoire Jacq	(Spain) Íñigo Cervantes (Spain) Oriol Roca Batalla	2–6, 6–7^{(1–7)}
Win	7–4	Jun 2023	Lyon, France	Challenger	Clay	(France) Grégoire Jacq	(Germany) Constantin Frantzen (Germany) Hendrik Jebens	6–4, 2–6, [10–7]
Win	8–4	Jul 2023	Troyes, France	Challenger	Clay	(France) Grégoire Jacq	(Spain) Álvaro López San Martín (Spain) Daniel Rincón	Walkover
Win	9–4	Jul 2023	Amersfoort, Netherlands	Challenger	Clay	(France) Grégoire Jacq	(Netherlands) Mats Hermans (Netherlands) Sander Jong	6–4, 6–4
Win	10–4	Aug 2023	Meerbusch, Germany	Challenger	Clay	(France) Grégoire Jacq	(Brazil) Fernando Romboli (Brazil) Marcelo Zormann	7–5, 7–6
Win	11–4	Jan 2024	Nonthaburi, Thailand	Challenger	Hard	(France) Grégoire Jacq	(Philippines) Francis Casey Alcantara (China) Sun Fajing	6–4, 7–6^{(8–6)}
Win	12–4	Jan 2024	Quimper, France	Challenger	Hard (i)	(France) Arthur Rinderknech	(India) Anirudh Chandrasekar (India) Vijay Sundar Prashanth	7–6^{(7–4)}, 6–3
Win	13–4	Mar 2024	Zadar, Croatia	Challenger	Clay	(France) Grégoire Jacq	(Czech Republic) Roman Jebavý (Czech Republic) Zdeněk Kolář	6–4, 6–4
Win	14–4	Jun 2024	Lyon, France	Challenger	Clay	(France) Grégoire Jacq	(Greece) Markos Kalovelonis (Ukraine) Vladyslav Orlov	4–7, 6–3, [10–6]
Win	15–4	Jul 2024	Salzburg, Austria	Challenger	Clay	(France) Grégoire Jacq	(Czech Republic) Petr Nouza (Czech Republic) Patrik Rikl	2–6, 6–3, [14–12]
Loss	15–5	Sep 2024	Cassis, France	Challenger	Hard	(France) Matteo Martineau	(Portugal) Jaime Faria (Portugal) Henrique Rocha	6–7^{(5–7)}, 4–6
Loss	15–6	Sep 2024	Orléans, France	Challenger	Hard (i)	(France) Grégoire Jacq	(France) Benjamin Bonzi (France) Sascha Gueymard Wayenburg	6–7^{(7–9)}, 6–4, [5-10]
Win	1–0	Dec 2017	Tunisia F40, Hammamet	Futures	Clay	(France) Clément Tabur	(France) Samuel Bensoussan (France) François-Arthur Vibert	6–7^{(6–8)}, 6–2, [13–11]
Loss	1–1	May 2018	Bosnia & Herzegovina F1, Doboj	Futures	Clay	(France) Luka Pavlovic	(Germany) Christian Hirschmüller (Australia) Dane Propoggia	5–7, 5–7
Win	2–1	Jul 2018	Germany F9, Wetzlar	Futures	Clay	(France) François Musitelli	(Spain) Marco Neubau (Germany) Kai Wehnelt	6–1, 6–3
Win	3–1	Jan 2019	M25 Tucson, United States	WTT	Hard	(Tunisia) Aziz Dougaz	(United Kingdom) Lloyd Glasspool (United Kingdom) Evan Hoyt	6–4, 5–7, [10–3]
Win	4–1	May 2019	M15 Tabarka, Tunisia	WTT	Clay	(Argentina) Mariano Kestelboim	(Tunisia) Anis Ghorbel (Tunisia) Aziz Dougaz	6–4, 6–1
Loss	4–2	Jun 2019	M25 Pardubice, Czech Republic	WTT	Clay	(Tunisia) Aziz Dougaz	(Czech Republic) Vít Kopřiva (Czech Republic) Jaroslav Pospíšil	4–6, 2–6
Win	5–2	Dec 2019	M15 Cairo II, Egypt	WTT	Clay	(Lithuania) Laurynas Grigelis	(Argentina) Facundo Juarez (Argentina) Octavio Volpi	7–6^{(9–7)}, 6–3
Win	6–2	Aug 2020	M25 Vogau, Austria	WTT	Clay	(Germany) Johannes Härteis	(Netherlands) Gijs Brouwer (Netherlands) Jelle Sels	6–4, 4–6, 11–9
Win	7–2	Apr 2021	M25 Angers, France	WTT	Clay	(France) Corentin Denolly	(France) Arthur Cazaux (France) Titouan Droguet	Walkover
