= Kilian Feldbausch =

Swiss tennis player (born 2005)

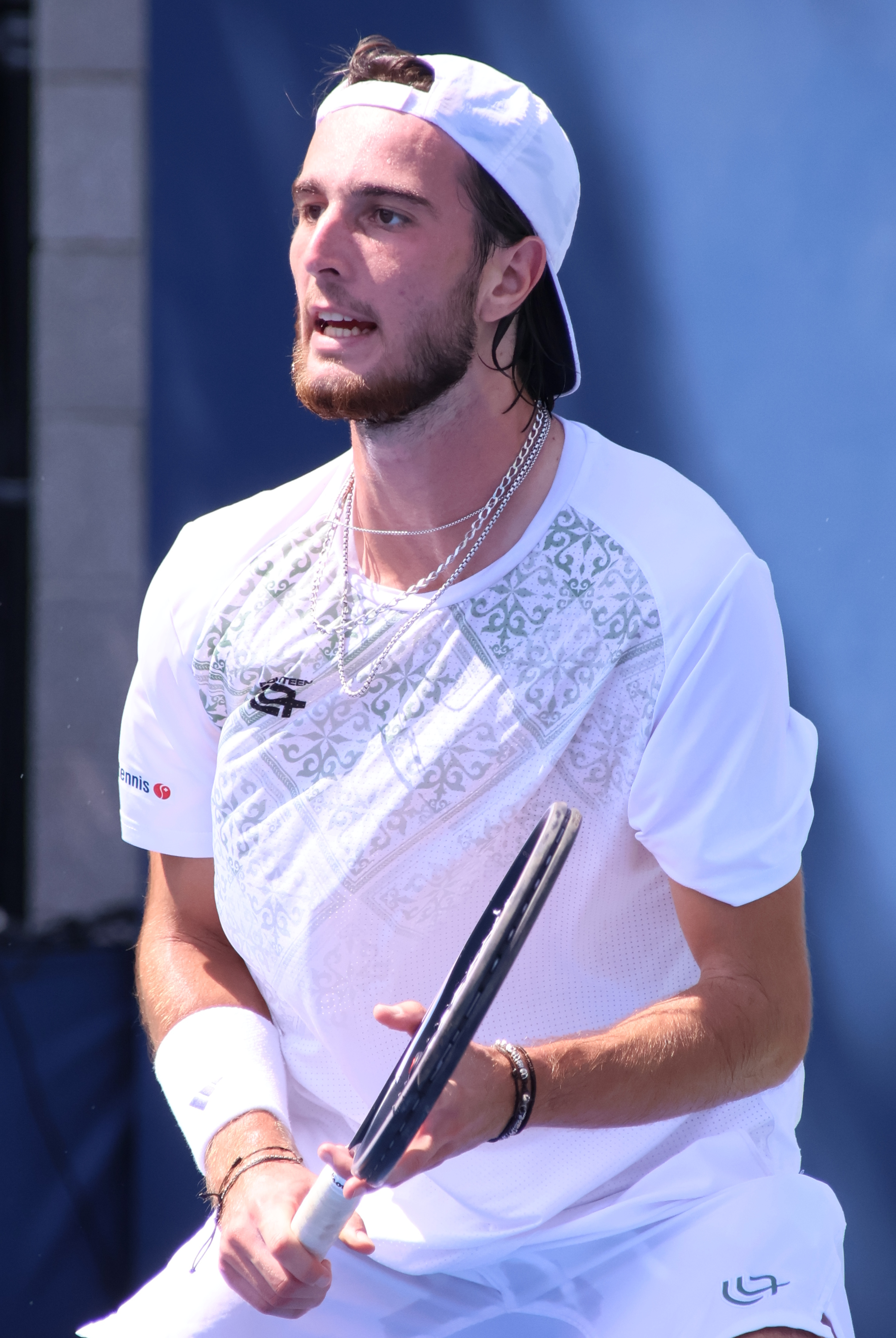
- Feldbausch at the 2026 US Open
- Country (sports): Switzerland
- Residence: Geneva, Switzerland
- Born: 7 September 2005 (age 21) Geneva, Switzerland
- Height: 1.91 m (6 ft 3 in)
- Plays: Right-handed (two-handed backhand)
- Coach: Cathy Feldbausch-Caverzasio
- Prize money: US $212,142

Singles
- Career record: 1–2 (at ATP Tour level, Grand Slam level, and in Davis Cup)
- Career titles: 0
- Highest ranking: No. 195 (16 November 2026)
- Current ranking: No. 195 (16 November 2026)

Grand Slam singles results
- US Open: Q1 (2026)
- Australian Open Junior: SF (2022)
- French Open Junior: 3R (2022)
- Wimbledon Junior: QF (2022)
- US Open Junior: QF (2022)

Doubles
- Career record: 0–1 (at ATP Tour level, Grand Slam level, and in Davis Cup)
- Career titles: 0
- Highest ranking: No. 458 (10 November 2025)
- Current ranking: No. 511 (16 November 2026)

Grand Slam doubles results
- Australian Open Junior: SF (2022)
- French Open Junior: 1R (2022)
- Wimbledon Junior: 2R (2022)
- US Open Junior: 2R (2022)
- Last updated on: 16 November 2026.

Kilian Feldbausch (born 7 September 2005) is a Swiss tennis player. He has a career-high ATP singles rankings of world No. 195 achieved on 16 November 2026 and a career-high doubles ranking of No. 458 achieved on 10 November 2025. He is currently the No. 5 Swiss singles player.

== Personal life ==
He is the son of former tennis player Cathy Caverzasio.

== Career ==
=== 2021–2022: Juniors and Pro beginnings ===
He featured in a professional tennis tournament in Biel/Bienne, Switzerland in March 2021, at age 15.

Feldbausch became the first Swiss player since Roger Federer in 1998 to reach the semifinals of the junior Australian Open. He also reached the semifinals of the doubles, partnering Gabriel Debru.

Kilian Feldbausch won his first 3 ATP points after reaching the semifinals of the M25 Futures in Trimbach, Switzerland. He further reached the round of 16 at the Challenger Biel/Bienne, after beating the 7th seed Marc-Andrea Hüsler in the first round in straight sets. He then lost in straight sets with two tiebreaks, in the second round, to Filip Horanský.

=== 2025–2026: First Challenger title, top 300 ===
At the 2025 Città di Biella he reached his second Challenger final but lost to Stefano Napolitano. As a result he reached a new career-high in the top 350 at world No. 334 on 15 September 2025.

Feldbausch won his maiden Challenger title at the 2026 Košice Open, defeating Martin Krumich in the final. As a result he reached the top 300 on 8 June 2026.

== ATP Challenger Tour finals ==
=== Singles: 6 (2 titles, 4 runner-ups) ===
Legend ATP Challenger Tour (2–4)

Result	W–L	Date	Tournament	Tier	Surface	Opponent	Score
Loss	0–1	Dec 2023	Maspalomas, Spain	Challenger	Clay	(Spain) Pedro Martínez	4–6, 6–4, 3–6
Loss	0–2	Sep 2025	Biella, Italy	Challenger	Clay	(Italy) Stefano Napolitano	5–7, 4–6
Win	1–2	May 2026	Košice, Slovakia	Challenger	Clay	(Czech Republic) Martin Krumich	6–0, 4–6, 6–4
Loss	1–3	Jun 2026	Troyes, France	Challenger	Clay	(Germany) Marvin Möller	6–7^{(5–7)}, 4–6
Loss	1–4	Nov 2026	Taranto, Italy	Challenger	Hard	(France) Matteo Martineau	3–6, 2–6
Win	2–4	Nov 2026	Monastir, Tunisia	Challenger	Hard	(Germany) Marvin Möller	6–1, 6–2

=== Doubles: 1 (1 title) ===
Legend ATP Challenger Tour (1–0)

Result	W–L	Date	Tournament	Tier	Surface	Partner	Opponents	Score
Win	1–0	Mar 2025	Mérida, Mexico	Challenger	Clay	(Mexico) Rodrigo Pacheco Méndez	(United States) Trey Hilderbrand (United States) George Goldhoff	6-4, 6-2

== ITF World Tennis Tour finals ==
=== Singles: 2 (2 titles) ===
Legend ITF WTT (2–0)

Result	W–L	Date	Tournament	Tier	Surface	Opponent	Score
Win	1–0	Nov 2023	M15 Boca Raton, United States	WTT	Clay	(United States) Garrett Johns	6–4, 7–5
Win	2–0	Dec 2024	M15 Antalya, Turkey	WTT	Clay	Evgenii Tiurnev	6–3, 6–4

=== Doubles: 1 (1 title) ===
Legend ITF WTT (1–0)

Result	W–L	Date	Tournament	Tier	Surface	Partner	Opponents	Score
Win	1–0	Jan 2025	M15 Antalya, Turkey	WTT	Clay	(Mexico) Rodrigo Pacheco Méndez	(Czech Republic) Vit Kalina (Ukraine) Nikita Mashtakov	3-6, 6-2, 10-5
