= Mats Hermans =

Dutch tennis player (born 1996)

- Country (sports): Netherlands
- Born: 6 April 1996 (age 30) Heythuysen, Netherlands
- Height: 1.83 m (6 ft 0 in)
- Plays: Right-handed (two-handed backhand)
- Coach: Willem Jan van Hulst
- Prize money: US $73,274

Singles
- Career record: 0–0 (at ATP Tour level, Grand Slam level, and in Davis Cup)
- Career titles: 0
- Highest ranking: No. 1,368 (17 February 2020)

Doubles
- Career record: 0–0 (at ATP Tour level, Grand Slam level, and in Davis Cup)
- Career titles: 1 Challenger, 11 ITF
- Highest ranking: No. 166 (15 September 2025)
- Current ranking: No. 249 (14 September 2026)
- Last updated on: 16 September 2026.

Mats Hermans (born 6 April 1996) is a Dutch tennis player. He has a career high ATP singles ranking of No. 1,368 achieved on 17 February 2020 and a career high ATP doubles ranking of No. 166 achieved on 15 September 2025.

Hermans has won one ATP Challenger doubles title at the 2026 Internationaux de Tennis de Troyes.
