= Internationaux de Tennis de Troyes =

Internationaux de Troyes
- 2025 Internationaux de Tennis de Troyes

ATP Challenger Tour
- Event name: Internationaux de Tennis de Troyes
- Location: Troyes, France
- Category: ATP Challenger Tour
- Surface: Clay
- Prize money: €54,000
- Website: Internationaux-Troyes.com

The Internationaux de Tennis de Troyes is a professional tennis tournament played on clay courts. It is currently part of the Association of Tennis Professionals (ATP) Challenger Tour. It is held in Troyes, France, with the first edition played in 2022. It was originally supposed to be held in 2020 but was canceled due to the COVID-19 pandemic.

== Past finals ==
=== Singles ===
Year	Champion	Runner-up	Score
2026	(Germany) Marvin Möller	(Switzerland) Kilian Feldbausch	7–6^{(7–5)}, 6–3
2025	(United Kingdom) Jan Choinski	(France) Calvin Hemery	6–4, 6–7^{(4–7)}, 6–2
2024	(France) Gabriel Debru	(Kazakhstan) Timofey Skatov	6–3, 6–7^{(1–7)}, 7–5
2023	(France) Manuel Guinard	(France) Calvin Hemery	6–4, 6–3
2022	(Argentina) Juan Bautista Torres	(Lebanon) Benjamin Hassan	7–6^{(7–2)}, 6–2

=== Doubles ===
Year	Champions	Runners-up	Score
2026	(Netherlands) Mats Hermans (Brazil) Igor Marcondes	(Bulgaria) Anthony Genov (Germany) Kai Wehnelt	6–3, 3–6, [10–7]
2025	(Spain) Mario Mansilla Díez (Spain) Bruno Pujol Navarro	(Czech Republic) David Poljak (Germany) Tim Rühl	7–6^{(7–3)}, 7–6^{(7–2)}
2024	(Austria) Neil Oberleitner (Switzerland) Jakub Paul	(Uzbekistan) Denis Istomin; Evgeny Karlovskiy	6–4, 7–6^{(7–1)}
2023	(France) Manuel Guinard (France) Grégoire Jacq	(Spain) Álvaro López San Martín (Spain) Daniel Rincón	walkover
2022	(Spain) Íñigo Cervantes (Spain) Oriol Roca Batalla	(Argentina) Thiago Agustín Tirante (Argentina) Juan Bautista Torres	6–1, 6–2
