= Bruno Pujol Navarro =

Spanish tennis player (born 2001)

- Country (sports): Spain
- Born: 27 August 2001 (age 24) Barcelona, Spain
- Height: 1.78 m (5 ft 10 in)
- Plays: Left-handed (two-handed backhand)
- Prize money: US $81,070

Singles
- Career record: 0–0 (at ATP Tour level, Grand Slam level, and in Davis Cup)
- Career titles: 0
- Highest ranking: No. 712 (29 August 2022)
- Current ranking: No. 1,678 (4 May 2026)

Doubles
- Career record: 0–0 (at ATP Tour level, Grand Slam level, and in Davis Cup)
- Career titles: 1 Challenger, 9 ITF
- Highest ranking: No. 135 (4 May 2026)
- Current ranking: No. 135 (4 May 2026)
- Last updated on: 4 May 2026.

Bruno Pujol Navarro (born 27 August 2001) is a Spanish tennis player. Pujol Navarro has a career high ATP singles ranking of No. 712 achieved on 29 August 2022 and a career high ATP doubles ranking of No. 135 achieved on 4 May 2026.

Pujol Navarro has won one ATP Challenger doubles title.
