= 2024 Play In Challenger – Singles =

Singles
- 2024 Play In Challenger

Final
- Champion: (France) Arthur Rinderknech
- Runner-up: (Belgium) Joris De Loore
- Score: 6–4, 3–6, 7–6^{(10–8)}

Events
Singles	Doubles
← 2023 ·	Play In Challenger	· 2025 →

Otto Virtanen was the defending champion but lost in the semifinals to Arthur Rinderknech.

Rinderknech won the title after defeating Joris De Loore 6–4, 3–6, 7–6^{(10–8)} in the final.

== Seeds ==
1. (France) Arthur Rinderknech (champion)
2. (United States) Brandon Nakashima (withdrew)
3. (France) Benoît Paire (first round)
4. (Belgium) Zizou Bergs (first round)
5. (France) Grégoire Barrère (quarterfinals)
6. (Moldova) Radu Albot (quarterfinals)
7. (Germany) Benjamin Hassan (second round)
8. (France) Giovanni Mpetshi Perricard (quarterfinals)

== Draw ==
=== Key ===
- Q = Qualifier
- WC = Wild card
- LL = Lucky loser
- Alt = Alternate
- SE = Special exempt
- PR = Protected ranking
- ITF = ITF entry
- JE = Junior exempt
- w/o = Walkover
- r = Retired
- d = Defaulted
- SR = Special ranking

=== Finals ===
Semifinals
1	(France) Arthur Rinderknech	6	4	6
(Finland) Otto Virtanen	4	6	2
(Belgium) Joris De Loore	7	6
(France) Pierre-Hugues Herbert	5	4

Final
1	(France) Arthur Rinderknech	6	3	7^{10}
(Belgium) Joris De Loore	4	6	6^{8}

=== Top half ===
First round
1	(France) A Rinderknech	6	6
(Switzerland) L Riedi	4	4
(South Africa) L Harris	6^{4}	3
WC	(France) L Pouille	7^{7}	6
(United Kingdom) B Harris	6	7^{7}
WC	(France) A Géa	4	6^{4}
Q	(Germany) H Squire	7^{7}	6^{8}	3
7	(Germany) B Hassan	6^{3}	7^{10}	6
3/WC	(France) B Paire	4	7	3
(Belgium) A Blockx	6	5	6
(Finland) O Virtanen	6	3	6
LL	(Germany) O Otte	4	6	1
Q	(Belgium) M Geerts	6	4	5
Q	(Syria) H Naw	4	6	7
(Czech Republic) Z Kolář	3	3
5	(France) G Barrère	6	6

Second round
1	(France) A Rinderknech	6^{8}	7	6
WC	(France) L Pouille	7^{10}	5	4
(United Kingdom) B Harris	6	4	6
7	(Germany) B Hassan	4	6	3
(Belgium) A Blockx	1	4
(Finland) O Virtanen	6	6
Q	(Syria) H Naw	5	1^{r}
5	(France) G Barrère	7	2

Quarterfinals
1	(France) A Rinderknech	4	7	6
(United Kingdom) B Harris	6	5	4
(Finland) O Virtanen	6	6
5	(France) G Barrère	2	2

Semifinals
1	(France) A Rinderknech	6	4	6
(Finland) O Virtanen	4	6	2

=== Bottom half ===
First round
6	(Moldova) R Albot	6	6^{5}	6
Alt	(Estonia) M Lajal	2	7^{7}	3
(Netherlands) G Brouwer	6	6
(Croatia) D Prižmić	2	4
Q	(France) M Guinard	6^{2}	2
(France) T Droguet	7^{7}	6
(Belgium) J De Loore	4	7	7^{7}
4	(Belgium) Z Bergs	6	5	6^{4}
8	(France) G Mpetshi Perricard	6	1	6
(United Kingdom) J Choinski	3	6	1
(Japan) S Shimabukuro	6	6
Alt	(Italy) M Bellucci	4	1
(France) A Escoffier	6^{9}	5
Q	(France) T Lamasine	7^{11}	7
(France) P-H Herbert	6	6
Q	(France) A Bouquier	4	4

Second round
6	(Moldova) R Albot	7	6
(Netherlands) G Brouwer	5	2
(France) T Droguet	6^{3}	6^{2}
(Belgium) J De Loore	7^{7}	7^{7}
8	(France) G Mpetshi Perricard	6	7
(Japan) S Shimabukuro	4	5
Q	(France) T Lamasine	1	5
(France) P-H Herbert	6	7

Quarterfinals
6	(Moldova) R Albot	3	6	6^{2}
(Belgium) J De Loore	6	4	7^{7}
8	(France) G Mpetshi Perricard	6^{3}	6^{4}
(France) P-H Herbert	7^{7}	7^{7}

Semifinals
(Belgium) J De Loore	7	6
(France) P-H Herbert	5	4
