= 2022 Play In Challenger – Singles =

Singles
- 2022 Play In Challenger

Final
- Champion: (France) Quentin Halys
- Runner-up: (Lithuania) Ričardas Berankis
- Score: 4–6, 7–6^{(7–4)}, 6–4

Events
Singles	Doubles
← 2021 ·	Play In Challenger	· 2023 →

Zizou Bergs was the defending champion but lost in the quarterfinals to Quentin Halys.

Halys won the title after defeating Ričardas Berankis 4–6, 7–6^{(7–4)}, 6–4 in the final.

== Seeds ==
1. (Lithuania) Ričardas Berankis (final)
2. (France) Quentin Halys (champion)
3. (Bosnia and Herzegovina) Damir Džumhur (first round)
4. Roman Safiullin (first round)
5. (France) Grégoire Barrère (second round)
6. (France) Enzo Couacaud (first round, retired)
7. (Belgium) Zizou Bergs (quarterfinals)
8. (France) Constant Lestienne (semifinals)

== Draw ==
=== Key ===
- Q = Qualifier
- WC = Wild card
- LL = Lucky loser
- Alt = Alternate
- SE = Special exempt
- PR = Protected ranking
- ITF = ITF entry
- JE = Junior exempt
- w/o = Walkover
- r = Retired
- d = Defaulted
- SR = Special ranking

=== Finals ===
Semifinals
1	(Lithuania) Ričardas Berankis	6	6
Q	(Czech Republic) Jonáš Forejtek	4	4
8	(France) Constant Lestienne	6^{6}	6	4
2	(France) Quentin Halys	7^{8}	4	6

Final
1	(Lithuania) Ričardas Berankis	6	6^{4}	4
2	(France) Quentin Halys	4	7^{7}	6

=== Top half ===
First round
1	(Lithuania) R Berankis	6	5	6
(France) E Furness	0	7	1
(Germany) T Kamke	6	6
Q	(Germany) H Squire	2	4
Q	(Canada) A Galarneau	1	6	6
WC	(France) S Gueymard Wayenburg	6	4	2
(Italy) A Arnaboldi	3	1
5	(France) G Barrère	6	6
3	(Bosnia and Herzegovina) D Džumhur	6^{2}	5
Q	(Czech Republic) J Forejtek	7^{7}	7
(France) G Blancaneaux	6	6
(France) M Janvier	4	3
PR	(Tunisia) M Jaziri	7^{7}	6
PR	(Germany) Y Maden	6^{3}	3
Q	(Norway) V Durasovic	6	3	2
6	(France) E Couacaud	3	6	2^{r}

Second round
1	(Lithuania) R Berankis	3	6	6
(Germany) T Kamke	6	1	2
Q	(Canada) A Galarneau	6	6
5	(France) G Barrère	4	2
Q	(Czech Republic) J Forejtek	6	4	7^{10}
(France) G Blancaneaux	1	6	6^{8}
PR	(Tunisia) M Jaziri	6	7
Q	(Norway) V Durasovic	4	5

Quarterfinals
1	(Lithuania) R Berankis	6	6
Q	(Canada) A Galarneau	4	3
Q	(Czech Republic) J Forejtek	7^{7}	6
PR	(Tunisia) M Jaziri	6^{5}	1

Semifinals
1	(Lithuania) R Berankis	6	6
Q	(Czech Republic) J Forejtek	4	4

=== Bottom half ===
First round
8	(France) C Lestienne	7^{7}	6
(Japan) K Uchida	6^{0}	2
(Italy) L Nardi	6	3	0
WC	(France) Sean Cuenin	3	6	6
(Netherlands) R Haase	7^{10}	6^{1}	6
(Ukraine) I Marchenko	6^{8}	7^{7}	2
Q	(France) A Fils	6	7^{7}
4	R Safiullin	2	6^{3}
7	(Belgium) Z Bergs	6	4	6
(France) A Hoang	3	6	4
Q	(France) L Lokoli	6	6
WC	(Belgium) Simon Beaupain	1	1
(Ukraine) V Sachko	6	6
(France) A Müller	2	3
(Bosnia and Herzegovina) M Bašić	1	3
2	(France) Q Halys	6	6

Second round
8	(France) C Lestienne	6	6
WC	(France) S Cuenin	4	1
(Netherlands) R Haase	6^{5}	4
Q	(France) A Fils	7^{7}	6
7	(Belgium) Z Bergs	6	3	6
Q	(France) L Lokoli	2	6	3
(Ukraine) V Sachko	4	4
2	(France) Q Halys	6	6

Quarterfinals
8	(France) C Lestienne	6	6
Q	(France) A Fils	3	2
7	(Belgium) Z Bergs	6^{3}	6	3
2	(France) Q Halys	7^{7}	3	6

Semifinals
8	(France) C Lestienne	6^{6}	6	4
2	(France) Q Halys	7^{8}	4	6
