= 2024 Play In Challenger – Doubles =

Doubles
- 2024 Play In Challenger

Final
- Champions: (United States) Christian Harrison (United Kingdom) Marcus Willis
- Runners-up: (France) Titouan Droguet (France) Giovanni Mpetshi Perricard
- Score: 7–6^{(8–6)}, 6–3

Events
| Singles | Doubles |
| ← 2023 · | Play In Challenger | · 2025 → |

Max Purcell and Jason Taylor were the defending champions but chose not to defend their title.

Christian Harrison and Marcus Willis won the title after defeating Titouan Droguet and Giovanni Mpetshi Perricard 7–6^{(8–6)}, 6–3 in the final.

== Seeds ==
1. (Germany) Constantin Frantzen / (Germany) Hendrik Jebens (quarterfinals)
2. (France) Jonathan Eysseric / (France) Albano Olivetti (quarterfinals)
3. (France) Manuel Guinard / (France) Grégoire Jacq (first round)
4. Ivan Liutarevich / (Ukraine) Vladyslav Manafov (semifinals)

== Draw ==
Key

- Q = Qualifier
- WC = Wild card
- LL = Lucky loser
- Alt = Alternate
- ITF = ITF entry
- PR = Protected ranking
- SR = Special ranking
- SE = Special exempt
- JE = Junior exempt
- JR = Junior Accelerator Programme entrant
- CO = College Accelerator Programme entrant
- NG = Next Gen Accelerator Program entrant
- w/o = Walkover
- r = Retired
- d = Defaulted

First round
1 | (Germany) C Frantzen (Germany) H Jebens | 7 | 7
(United States) G Goldhoff (United Kingdom) L Johnson | 5 | 5
(South Africa) L Harris (Poland) S Walków | 6 | 6^{3} | [9]
(France) T Droguet (France) G Mpetshi Perricard | 4 | 7^{7} | [11]
4 | I Liutarevich (Ukraine) V Manafov | 6 | 6
WC | (Bulgaria) R Shandarov (Bulgaria) V Shandarov | 1 | 4
WC | (France) R Bertrand (France) Cyril Vandermeersch | 4 | 5
Alt | (Netherlands) G Brouwer (Kazakhstan) B Zhukayev | 6 | 7
(United States) C Harrison (United Kingdom) M Willis | 6 | 6^{5} | [10]
(Sweden) F Bergevi (Netherlands) M Veldheer | 4 | 7^{7} | [8]
(Belgium) M Geerts (Finland) P Niklas-Salminen | 6 | 2 | [10]
3 | (France) M Guinard (France) G Jacq | 3 | 6 | [4]
(France) A Escoffier (United Kingdom) J Paris | w/o
(Moldova) R Albot (Germany) Niklas Schell
(South Korea) J-s Nam (Japan) S Shimabukuro | 4 | 6^{6}
2 | (France) J Eysseric (France) A Olivetti | 6 | 7^{8}

Quarterfinals
1 | (Germany) C Frantzen (Germany) H Jebens | 6^{3} | 4
(France) T Droguet (France) G Mpetshi Perricard | 7^{7} | 6
4 | I Liutarevich (Ukraine) V Manafov | 7^{7} | 6
Alt | (Netherlands) G Brouwer (Kazakhstan) B Zhukayev | 6^{4} | 4
(United States) C Harrison (United Kingdom) M Willis | 6 | 3 | [13]
(Belgium) M Geerts (Finland) P Niklas-Salminen | 3 | 6 | [11]
(France) A Escoffier (United Kingdom) J Paris | 7^{9} | 6
2 | (France) J Eysseric (France) A Olivetti | 6^{7} | 3

Semifinals
(France) T Droguet (France) G Mpetshi Perricard | 7^{7} | 6
4 | I Liutarevich (Ukraine) V Manafov | 6^{4} | 3
(United States) C Harrison (United Kingdom) M Willis | 6 | 6
(France) A Escoffier (United Kingdom) J Paris | 2 | 2

Final
(France) T Droguet (France) G Mpetshi Perricard | 6^{6} | 3
(United States) C Harrison (United Kingdom) M Willis | 7^{8} | 6
