= 2022 Play In Challenger =

- Date: 21–27 March
- Edition: 4th
- Surface: Hard (indoor)
- Location: Lille, France

Champions

Singles
- (France) Quentin Halys

Doubles
- (Norway) Viktor Durasovic / (Finland) Patrik Niklas-Salminen
← 2021 ·	Play In Challenger	· 2023 →

The 2022 Play In Challenger was a professional tennis tournament played on indoor hard courts. It was the fourth edition of the tournament, which was part of the 2022 ATP Challenger Tour. It took place in Lille, France, between 21 and 27 March 2022.

== Singles main-draw entrants ==
=== Seeds ===
Country	Player	Rank^{1}	Seed
LTU	Ričardas Berankis	84	1
FRA	Quentin Halys	113	2
BIH	Damir Džumhur	137	3
	Roman Safiullin	143	4
FRA	Grégoire Barrère	172	5
FRA	Enzo Couacaud	181	6
BEL	Zizou Bergs	182	7
FRA	Constant Lestienne	198	8

- ^{1} Rankings are as of 14 March 2022.

=== Other entrants ===
The following players received wildcards into the singles main draw:

- (Belgium) Simon Beaupain
- (France) Sean Cuenin
- (France) Sascha Gueymard Wayenburg

The following players received entry into the singles main draw using protected rankings:

- (Tunisia) Malek Jaziri
- (Germany) Yannick Maden

The following players received entry from the qualifying draw:

- (Norway) Viktor Durasovic
- (France) Arthur Fils
- (Czech Republic) Jonáš Forejtek
- (Canada) Alexis Galarneau
- (France) Laurent Lokoli
- (Germany) Henri Squire

== Champions ==
=== Singles ===
- (France) Quentin Halys def. (Lithuania) Ričardas Berankis 4–6, 7–6^{(7–4)}, 6–4.

=== Doubles ===
- (Norway) Viktor Durasovic / (Finland) Patrik Niklas-Salminen def. (France) Jonathan Eysseric / (France) Quentin Halys 7–5, 7–6^{(7–1)}.
