= 2026 Play In Challenger – Singles =

Singles
- 2026 Play In Challenger

Final
- Champion: (France) Luca Van Assche
- Runner-up: (Belgium) Alexander Blockx
- Score: 6–2, 6–4

Events
Singles	Doubles
- Play In Challenger

Arthur Bouquier was the defending champion but lost in the second round to Alexander Blockx.

Luca Van Assche won the title after defeating Blockx 6–2, 6–4 in the final.

== Seeds ==
1. (Austria) Filip Misolic (first round, retired)
2. (United Kingdom) Jacob Fearnley (first round)
3. (France) Hugo Gaston (second round)
4. (Belgium) Alexander Blockx (final)
5. (Belgium) David Goffin (first round)
6. (France) Titouan Droguet (quarterfinals)
7. (France) Luca Van Assche (champion)
8. (France) Benjamin Bonzi (quarterfinals)

== Draw ==
Key

- Q = Qualifier
- WC = Wild card
- LL = Lucky loser
- Alt = Alternate
- ITF = ITF entry
- PR = Protected ranking
- SR = Special ranking
- SE = Special exempt
- JE = Junior exempt
- JR = Junior Accelerator Programme entrant
- CO = College Accelerator Programme entrant
- NG = Next Gen Accelerator Program entrant
- w/o = Walkover
- r = Retired
- d = Defaulted

=== Finals ===
Semifinals
(Switzerland) Jérôme Kym	3	6^{4}
4	(Belgium) Alexander Blockx	6	7^{7}
WC	(France) Moïse Kouamé	1	1
7	(France) Luca Van Assche	6	6

Final
4	(Belgium) Alexander Blockx	2	4
7	(France) Luca Van Assche	6	6

=== Top half ===
First round
1	(Austria) F Misolic	1	1^{r}
(Spain) M Landaluce	6	1
(Switzerland) J Kym	5	7^{8}	6
SE	(South Africa) L Harris	7	6^{6}	4
(Kazakhstan) T Skatov	6	6
Q	(France) C Hemery	1	3
(Ukraine) V Sachko	0	6	3
6/WC	(France) T Droguet	6	4	6
4	(Belgium) A Blockx	6	6
R Safiullin	2	2
WC	(France) A Bouquier	7	0	7
Q	(Belgium) K Coppejans	5	6	5
Q	(France) Loann Massard	6^{5}	3
(Germany) J Engel	7^{7}	6
Alt	(Estonia) D Glinka	4	4
8	(France) B Bonzi	6	6

Second round
(Spain) M Landaluce	4	3
(Switzerland) J Kym	6	6
(Kazakhstan) T Skatov	6^{6}	2
6/WC	(France) T Droguet	7^{8}	6
4	(Belgium) A Blockx	6	7^{7}
WC	(France) A Bouquier	1	6^{3}
(Germany) J Engel	2	2
8	(France) B Bonzi	6	6

Quarterfinals
(Switzerland) J Kym	6	5	6
6/WC	(France) T Droguet	4	7	2
4	(Belgium) A Blockx	6	6
8	(France) B Bonzi	3	4

Semifinals
(Switzerland) J Kym	3	6^{4}
4	(Belgium) A Blockx	6	7^{7}

=== Bottom half ===
First round
5	(Belgium) D Goffin	6	3	4
NG	(Austria) J Schwärzler	4	6	6
WC	(France) M Kouamé	6	6
Q	(Croatia) M Dodig	4	2
Q	(United States) N Basavareddy	6	6
(France) U Blanchet	2	2
(Austria) S Ofner	2	6	4
3	(France) H Gaston	6	3	6
7	(France) L Van Assche	3	7^{7}	6
(Switzerland) L Riedi	6	6^{2}	4
Q	(Kazakhstan) M Kukushkin	6	6
(Italy) G Zeppieri	3	1
(Denmark) A Holmgren	3	5
(France) S Gueymard Wayenburg	6	7
(France) C Chidekh	6	2	6
2	(United Kingdom) J Fearnley	3	6	2

Second round
NG	(Austria) J Schwärzler	3	4
WC	(France) M Kouamé	6	6
Q	(United States) N Basavareddy	6	6
3	(France) H Gaston	4	1
7	(France) L Van Assche	6	6
Q	(Kazakhstan) M Kukushkin	3	2
(France) S Gueymard Wayenburg	6^{5}	6^{4}
(France) C Chidekh	7^{7}	7^{7}

Quarterfinals
WC	(France) M Kouamé	6	6
Q	(United States) N Basavareddy	3	3
7	(France) L Van Assche	6	6
(France) C Chidekh	2	3

Semifinals
WC	(France) M Kouamé	1	1
7	(France) L Van Assche	6	6
