= 2019 Play In Challenger – Doubles =

Doubles
- 2019 Play In Challenger

Final
- Champions: (Monaco) Romain Arneodo (France) Hugo Nys
- Runners-up: (Israel) Jonathan Erlich (France) Fabrice Martin
- Score: 7–5, 5–7, [10–8]

Events
Singles	Doubles
← 2018 ·	Play In Challenger	· 2021 →

Hugo Nys and Tim Pütz were the defending champions but only Nys chose to defend his title, partnering Romain Arneodo. Nys successfully defended his title.

Arneodo and Nys won the title after defeating Jonathan Erlich and Fabrice Martin 7–5, 5–7, [10–8] in the final.

== Seeds ==
1. (Ukraine) Denys Molchanov / (Slovakia) Igor Zelenay (first round)
2. (Austria) Philipp Oswald / (India) Leander Paes (first round)
3. (Monaco) Romain Arneodo / (France) Hugo Nys (champions)
4. (Israel) Jonathan Erlich / (France) Fabrice Martin (final)

== Draw ==
=== Key ===
- Q = Qualifier
- WC = Wild card
- LL = Lucky loser
- Alt = Alternate
- SE = Special exempt
- PR = Protected ranking
- ITF = ITF entry
- JE = Junior exempt
- w/o = Walkover
- r = Retired
- d = Defaulted
- SR = Special ranking

First round
1	(Ukraine) D Molchanov (Slovakia) I Zelenay	6^{5}	4
(Australia) R Junaid (Netherlands) D Pel	7^{7}	6
(United States) R Galloway (United States) N Lammons	4	6	[10]
(Australia) M Reid (Ukraine) S Stakhovsky	6	3	[7]
3	(Monaco) R Arneodo (France) H Nys	6	2	[11]
WC	(France) B Bonzi (France) Q Halys	4	6	[9]
(Austria) J Melzer (Slovakia) F Polášek	6	4	[7]
WC	(Belgium) N Desein (Belgium) Y Mertens	3	6	[10]
(France) J Eysseric (Croatia) A Šančić	2	6^{11}
ITF	(France) E Furness (France) G Jacq	6	7^{13}
ITF	(Spain) S Martos Gornés (Russia) R Safiullin	3	4
4	(Israel) J Erlich (France) F Martin	6	6
(Netherlands) S Arends (Austria) T-S Weissborn	7	6
WC	(Germany) A Begemann (Germany) D Brown	5	0
(Spain) G García López (Spain) D Vega Hernández	1	6	[10]
2	(Austria) P Oswald (India) L Paes	6	3	[4]

Quarterfinals
(Australia) R Junaid (Netherlands) D Pel	7^{7}	3	[8]
(United States) R Galloway (United States) N Lammons	6^{5}	6	[10]
3	(Monaco) R Arneodo (France) H Nys	6	6
WC	(Belgium) N Desein (Belgium) Y Mertens	3	4
ITF	(France) E Furness (France) G Jacq	3	6	[5]
4	(Israel) J Erlich (France) F Martin	6	3	[10]
(Netherlands) S Arends (Austria) T-S Weissborn	3	6	[10]
(Spain) G García López (Spain) D Vega Hernández	6	4	[6]

Semifinals
(United States) R Galloway (United States) N Lammons	7	4	[8]
3	(Monaco) R Arneodo (France) H Nys	5	6	[10]
4	(Israel) J Erlich (France) F Martin	2	6	[12]
(Netherlands) S Arends (Austria) T-S Weissborn	6	3	[10]

Final
3	(Monaco) R Arneodo (France) H Nys	7	5	[10]
4	(Israel) J Erlich (France) F Martin	5	7	[8]
