= 2018 Play In Challenger =

- Date: 19–25 March
- Edition: 1st
- Surface: Hard (indoor)
- Location: Lille, France

Champions

Singles
- (France) Grégoire Barrère

Doubles
- (France) Hugo Nys / (Germany) Tim Pütz
Play In Challenger	· 2019 →

The 2018 Play In Challenger was a professional tennis tournament played on indoor hard courts. It was the first edition of the tournament which was part of the 2018 ATP Challenger Tour. It took place in Lille, France, between 19 and 25 March 2018.

== Singles main-draw entrants ==
=== Seeds ===
Country	Player	Rank^{1}	Seed
FRA	Nicolas Mahut	101	1
FRA	Quentin Halys	121	2
GER	Yannick Maden	136	3
GER	Oscar Otte	137	4
FRA	Corentin Moutet	138	5
FRA	Stéphane Robert	159	6
~~GER~~	~~Mats Moraing~~	~~163~~	~~7~~
GER	Matthias Bachinger	171	8

- ^{1} Rankings are as of 5 March 2018.

=== Other entrants ===
The following players received wildcards into the singles main draw:

- (France) Hugo Grenier
- (France) Ugo Humbert
- (France) Maxime Janvier
- (Belgium) Yannick Mertens

The following players received entry from the qualifying draw:

- (France) Grégoire Barrère
- (France) Antoine Escoffier
- (France) David Guez
- (Spain) Guillermo Olaso

The following player received entry as a lucky loser:

- (Lithuania) Laurynas Grigelis

== Champions ==
=== Singles ===
- (France) Grégoire Barrère def. (Germany) Tobias Kamke 6–1, 6–4.

=== Doubles ===
- (France) Hugo Nys / (Germany) Tim Pütz def. (India) Jeevan Nedunchezhiyan / (India) Purav Raja 7–6^{(7–3)}, 1–6, [10–7].
