= 2023 Play In Challenger – Doubles =

Doubles
- 2023 Play In Challenger

Final
- Champions: (Australia) Max Purcell (Australia) Jason Taylor
- Runners-up: (Jamaica) Dustin Brown (Pakistan) Aisam-ul-Haq Qureshi
- Score: 7–6^{(7–3)}, 6–4

Events
Singles	Doubles
← 2022 ·	Play In Challenger	· 2024 →

Viktor Durasovic and Patrik Niklas-Salminen were the defending champions but only Niklas-Salminen chose to defend his title, partnering Bart Stevens. Niklas-Salminen lost in the semifinals to Max Purcell and Jason Taylor.

Purcell and Taylor won the title after defeating Dustin Brown and Aisam-ul-Haq Qureshi 7–6^{(7–3)}, 6–4 in the final.

== Seeds ==
1. (France) Dan Added / (France) Albano Olivetti (quarterfinals)
2. (Jamaica) Dustin Brown / (Pakistan) Aisam-ul-Haq Qureshi (final)
3. (Monaco) Romain Arneodo / (Austria) Sam Weissborn (quarterfinals)
4. (Australia) Andrew Harris / (Australia) John-Patrick Smith (first round)

== Draw ==
=== Key ===
- Q = Qualifier
- WC = Wild card
- LL = Lucky loser
- Alt = Alternate
- SE = Special exempt
- PR = Protected ranking
- ITF = ITF entry
- JE = Junior exempt
- w/o = Walkover
- r = Retired
- d = Defaulted
- SR = Special ranking

First round
1	(France) D Added (France) A Olivetti	6	7
(South Korea) J-s Nam (South Korea) M-k Song	2	5
WC	(France) A Hoang (France) G Jacq	6^{4}	4
(Australia) M Purcell (Australia) J Taylor	7^{7}	6
3	(Monaco) R Arneodo (Austria) S Weissborn	6	6
WC	(France) H Mayot (France) B Paire	2	3
(Finland) P Niklas-Salminen (Netherlands) B Stevens	6	7
(Turkey) A Çelikbilek (Bulgaria) D Kuzmanov	2	5
(United Kingdom) L Johnson (Netherlands) S Verbeek	6	6
(India) A Chandrasekar (India) VS Prashanth	3	1
(India) A Kadhe (Slovakia) I Zelenay	6	3	[10]
4	(Australia) A Harris (Australia) J-P Smith	3	6	[3]
(Belgium) M Geerts (Germany) Niklas Schell	6	6
(Israel) D Cukierman (New Zealand) A Sitak	3	2
(Poland) K Drzewiecki (Poland) S Walków	6	3	[9]
2	(Jamaica) D Brown (Pakistan) A-u-H Qureshi	4	6	[11]

Quarterfinals
1	(France) D Added (France) A Olivetti	4	4
(Australia) M Purcell (Australia) J Taylor	6	6
3	(Monaco) R Arneodo (Austria) S Weissborn	3	3
(Finland) P Niklas-Salminen (Netherlands) B Stevens	6	6
(United Kingdom) L Johnson (Netherlands) S Verbeek	7^{7}	6
(India) A Kadhe (Slovakia) I Zelenay	6^{4}	4
(Belgium) M Geerts (Germany) N Schell	3	6^{5}
2	(Jamaica) D Brown (Pakistan) A-u-H Qureshi	6	7^{7}

Semifinals
(Australia) M Purcell (Australia) J Taylor	6	3	[10]
(Finland) P Niklas-Salminen (Netherlands) B Stevens	4	6	[4]
(United Kingdom) L Johnson (Netherlands) S Verbeek	6^{5}	6^{5}
2	(Jamaica) D Brown (Pakistan) A-u-H Qureshi	7^{7}	7^{7}

Final
(Australia) M Purcell (Australia) J Taylor	7^{7}	6
2	(Jamaica) D Brown (Pakistan) A-u-H Qureshi	6^{3}	4
