= 2019 Play In Challenger – Singles =

Singles
- 2019 Play In Challenger

Final
- Champion: (France) Grégoire Barrère
- Runner-up: (Germany) Yannick Maden
- Score: 6–2, 4–6, 6–4

Events
| Singles | Doubles |
| ← 2018 · | Play In Challenger | · 2021 → |

Grégoire Barrère was the defending champion and successfully defended his title.

Barrère won the title after defeating Yannick Maden 6–2, 4–6, 6–4 in the final.

== Seeds ==
All seeds receive a bye into the second round.

1. (Spain) Guillermo García López (second round)
2. (Germany) Yannick Maden (final)
3. (France) Grégoire Barrère (champion)
4. (Germany) Matthias Bachinger (third round)
5. (Ukraine) Sergiy Stakhovsky (second round)
6. (Italy) Stefano Travaglia (second round, retired)
7. (France) Corentin Moutet (second round)
8. (France) Antoine Hoang (second round)
9. (Germany) Oscar Otte (second round)
10. (Austria) Dennis Novak (second round)
11. (Germany) Yannick Hanfmann (second round)
12. (Bosnia and Herzegovina) Mirza Bašić (second round)
13. (France) Quentin Halys (semifinals)
14. (Germany) Daniel Brands (second round)
15. (Austria) Sebastian Ofner (semifinals)
16. (Belgium) Arthur De Greef (third round)

== Draw ==
=== Key ===
- Q = Qualifier
- WC = Wild card
- LL = Lucky loser
- Alt = Alternate
- SE = Special exempt
- PR = Protected ranking
- ITF = ITF entry
- JE = Junior exempt
- w/o = Walkover
- r = Retired
- d = Defaulted
- SR = Special ranking

=== Finals ===
Quarterfinals
15 | (Austria) Sebastian Ofner | 6 | 7
(Slovakia) Norbert Gombos | 3 | 5
3 | (France) Grégoire Barrère | 6 | 6
Q | (Russia) Aslan Karatsev | 3 | 4
(Germany) Tobias Kamke | 6^{2} | 2
13 | (France) Quentin Halys | 7^{7} | 6
(United Kingdom) Jan Choinski | 3 | 3
2 | (Germany) Yannick Maden | 6 | 6

Semifinals
15 | (Austria) Sebastian Ofner | 4 | 6^{5}
3 | (France) Grégoire Barrère | 6 | 7^{7}
13 | (France) Quentin Halys | 6^{5} | 6 | 3
2 | (Germany) Yannick Maden | 7^{7} | 1 | 6

Final
3 | (France) Grégoire Barrère | 6 | 4 | 6
2 | (Germany) Yannick Maden | 2 | 6 | 4

=== Top half ===
==== Section 1 ====
First round
WC | (France) K de Schepper | 6^{6} | 6 | 1
(Czech Republic) A Pavlásek | 7^{8} | 2 | 6
ITF | (Portugal) F Ferreira Silva | 1 | 3
(Spain) B Zapata Miralles | 6 | 6
(Denmark) M Torpegaard | 1 | 6 | 6
(Germany) D Masur | 6 | 3 | 3
LL | (Spain) A Artuñedo | 6 | 4 | 4
(Slovakia) N Gombos | 4 | 6 | 6

Second round
1 | (Spain) G García López | 5 | 6^{6}
(Czech Republic) A Pavlásek | 7 | 7^{8}
(Spain) B Zapata Miralles | 6^{1} | 7^{7} | 6^{2}
15 | (Austria) S Ofner | 7^{7} | 6^{5} | 7^{7}
9 | (Germany) O Otte | 3 | 7^{7} | 3
(Denmark) M Torpegaard | 6 | 6^{3} | 6
(Slovakia) N Gombos | 7 | 3 | 7
7 | (France) C Moutet | 5 | 6 | 5

Third round
(Czech Republic) A Pavlásek | 3 | 2
15 | (Austria) S Ofner | 6 | 6
(Denmark) M Torpegaard | 3 | 0
(Slovakia) N Gombos | 6 | 6

Quarterfinals
15 | (Austria) S Ofner | 6 | 7
(Slovakia) N Gombos | 3 | 5

==== Section 2 ====
First round
Q | (Belgium) Y Mertens | 6 | 7^{7}
WC | (France) E Furness | 0 | 6^{3}
ITF | (France) G Jacq | 6^{10} | 2
(Serbia) V Troicki | 7^{12} | 6
(France) N Mahut | 6^{6} | 4
(Russia) A Vatutin | 7^{8} | 6
Q | (Russia) A Karatsev | 6 | 6
ITF | (Russia) R Safiullin | 3 | 3

Second round
3 | (France) G Barrère | 6 | 6
Q | (Belgium) Y Mertens | 4 | 1
(Serbia) V Troicki | 6 | 6
14 | (Germany) D Brands | 1 | 3
12 | (Bosnia and Herzegovina) M Bašić | 3 | 2
(Russia) A Vatutin | 6 | 6
Q | (Russia) A Karatsev | 6 | 6
5 | (Ukraine) S Stakhovsky | 3 | 4

Third round
3 | (France) G Barrère | 3 | 6 | 6
(Serbia) V Troicki | 6 | 3 | 2
(Russia) A Vatutin | 5 | 1
Q | (Russia) A Karatsev | 7 | 6

Quarterfinals
3 | (France) G Barrère | 6 | 6
Q | (Russia) A Karatsev | 3 | 4

=== Bottom half ===
==== Section 3 ====
First round
(France) E Benchetrit | 1 | 0^{r}
(Germany) T Kamke | 6 | 3
WC | (France) J Tatlot | 6 | 0
WC | (France) G Blancaneaux | 3 | 0^{r}
(Austria) L Miedler | 7^{7} | 6
(Netherlands) T Griekspoor | 6^{5} | 4
(Hungary) A Balázs | 2 | 2
ITF | (Italy) R Bonadio | 6 | 6

Second round
6 | (Italy) S Travaglia | 3 | 0^{r}
(Germany) T Kamke | 6 | 0
WC | (France) J Tatlot | 6 | 6
10 | (Austria) D Novak | 4 | 2
13 | (France) Q Halys | 6 | 6
(Austria) L Miedler | 4 | 1
ITF | (Italy) R Bonadio | 1 | 2
4 | (Germany) M Bachinger | 6 | 6

Third round
(Germany) T Kamke | 6 | 6
WC | (France) J Tatlot | 2 | 4
13 | (France) Q Halys | 5 | 7 | 6
4 | (Germany) M Bachinger | 7 | 5 | 3

Quarterfinals
(Germany) T Kamke | 6^{2} | 2
13 | (France) Q Halys | 7^{7} | 6

==== Section 4 ====
First round
WC | (France) R Roumane | 6 | 6
(Turkey) C İlkel | 3 | 2
(United Kingdom) J Choinski | 6 | 6
(Slovakia) F Horanský | 4 | 4
(Italy) M Viola | 4 | 7 | 6
(France) B Bonzi | 6 | 5 | 3
(Germany) D Brown | 6 | 6
(France) M Janvier | 4 | 4

Second round
8 | (France) A Hoang | 6^{4} | 3
WC | (France) R Roumane | 7^{7} | 6
(United Kingdom) J Choinski | 6 | 6
11 | (Germany) Y Hanfmann | 0 | 4
16 | (Belgium) A De Greef | 6 | 6
(Italy) M Viola | 3 | 1
(Germany) D Brown | 4 | 2
2 | (Germany) Y Maden | 6 | 6

Third round
WC | (France) R Roumane | 6 | 4 | 6^{4}
(United Kingdom) J Choinski | 4 | 6 | 7^{7}
16 | (Belgium) A De Greef | 3 | 4
2 | (Germany) Y Maden | 6 | 6

Quarterfinals
(United Kingdom) J Choinski | 3 | 3
2 | (Germany) Y Maden | 6 | 6
