= 2019 Play In Challenger =

- Date: 18–24 March
- Edition: 2nd
- Surface: Hard (indoor)
- Location: Lille, France

Champions

Singles
- (France) Grégoire Barrère

Doubles
- (Monaco) Romain Arneodo / (France) Hugo Nys
← 2018 ·	Play In Challenger	· 2021 →

The 2019 Play In Challenger was a professional tennis tournament played on indoor hard courts. It was the second edition of the tournament which was part of the 2019 ATP Challenger Tour. It took place in Lille, France, between 18 and 24 March 2019.

== Singles main-draw entrants ==
=== Seeds ===
Country	Player	Rank^{1}	Seed
ESP	Guillermo García López	109	1
GER	Yannick Maden	119	2
FRA	Grégoire Barrère	121	3
GER	Matthias Bachinger	123	4
UKR	Sergiy Stakhovsky	126	5
ITA	Stefano Travaglia	135	6
FRA	Corentin Moutet	137	7
FRA	Antoine Hoang	139	8
GER	Oscar Otte	144	9
AUT	Dennis Novak	156	10
GER	Yannick Hanfmann	158	11
BIH	Mirza Bašić	161	12
FRA	Quentin Halys	165	13
GER	Daniel Brands	167	14
AUT	Sebastian Ofner	179	15
BEL	Arthur De Greef	183	16

- ^{1} Rankings are as of 4 March 2019.

=== Other entrants ===
The following players received wildcards into the singles main draw:

- (France) Geoffrey Blancaneaux
- (France) Kenny de Schepper
- (France) Evan Furness
- (France) Rayane Roumane
- (France) Johan Tatlot

The following players received entry into the singles main draw using their ITF World Tennis Ranking:

- (Italy) Riccardo Bonadio
- (Portugal) Frederico Ferreira Silva
- (France) Grégoire Jacq
- (Russia) Roman Safiullin

The following players received entry from the qualifying draw:

- (Russia) Aslan Karatsev
- (Belgium) Yannick Mertens

The following player received entry as a lucky loser:

- (Spain) Andrés Artuñedo

== Champions ==
=== Singles ===
- (France) Grégoire Barrère def. (Germany) Yannick Maden 6–2, 4–6, 6–4.

=== Doubles ===
- (Monaco) Romain Arneodo / (France) Hugo Nys def. (Israel) Jonathan Erlich / (France) Fabrice Martin 7–5, 5–7, [10–8].
