= 2026 Play In Challenger – Doubles =

Doubles
- 2026 Play In Challenger

Final
- Champions: Ivan Liutarevich (Poland) Filip Pieczonka
- Runners-up: (Switzerland) Jakub Paul (Czech Republic) Matěj Vocel
- Score: 6–4, 3–6, [10–8]

Events
Singles	Doubles
- Play In Challenger

Jakub Paul and David Pel were the defending champions but only Paul chose to defend his title, partnering Matěj Vocel. They lost in the final to Ivan Liutarevich and Filip Pieczonka.

Liutarevich and Pieczonka won the title after defeating Paul and Vocel 6–4, 3–6, [10–8] in the final.

== Seeds ==
1. (Switzerland) Jakub Paul / (Czech Republic) Matěj Vocel (final)
2. (United Kingdom) Joshua Paris / (United Kingdom) Marcus Willis (semifinals)
3. (France) Arthur Reymond / (France) Luca Sanchez (quarterfinals)
4. (Australia) Blake Bayldon / (Poland) Karol Drzewiecki (first round)

== Draw ==
Key

- Q = Qualifier
- WC = Wild card
- LL = Lucky loser
- Alt = Alternate
- ITF = ITF entry
- PR = Protected ranking
- SR = Special ranking
- SE = Special exempt
- JE = Junior exempt
- JR = Junior Accelerator Programme entrant
- CO = College Accelerator Programme entrant
- NG = Next Gen Accelerator Program entrant
- w/o = Walkover
- r = Retired
- d = Defaulted

First round
1	(Switzerland) J Paul (Czech Republic) M Vocel	6	6
(India) A Chandrasekar (Israel) D Cukierman	4	4
(India) RC Bollipalli (United States) T Winegar	6^{2}	6	[7]
(Canada) C Harper (United Kingdom) D Stevenson	7^{7}	3	[10]
4	(Australia) B Bayldon (Poland) K Drzewiecki	4	0
(Romania) A Jecan (Netherlands) M Veldheer	6	6
(Romania) B Pavel (Czech Republic) M Vrbenský	7^{7}	6^{7}	[6]
(Poland) S Kielan (Poland) P Matuszewski	6^{5}	7^{9}	[10]
(Spain) S Martos Gornés (India) VS Prashanth	3	4
3	(France) A Reymond (France) L Sanchez	6	6
WC	(France) A Bouquier (France) F Martin	6	7^{7}
(Ukraine) D Molchanov (Croatia) N Serdarušić	1	6^{3}
(United States) N Lammons (United States) J Withrow	6^{3}	6^{4}
2	(United Kingdom) J Paris (United Kingdom) M Willis	7^{7}	7^{7}

Quarterfinals
1	(Switzerland) J Paul (Czech Republic) M Vocel	6	7^{7}
(Canada) C Harper (United Kingdom) D Stevenson	4	6^{4}
(Romania) A Jecan (Netherlands) M Veldheer	4	3
(Poland) S Kielan (Poland) P Matuszewski	6	6
I Liutarevich (Poland) F Pieczonka	7^{7}	6^{1}	[10]
3	(France) A Reymond (France) L Sanchez	6^{4}	7^{7}	[8]
WC	(France) A Bouquier (France) F Martin	6	4	[9]
2	(United Kingdom) J Paris (United Kingdom) M Willis	4	6	[11]

Semifinals
1	(Switzerland) J Paul (Czech Republic) M Vocel	6	7^{7}
(Poland) S Kielan (Poland) P Matuszewski	3	6^{3}
I Liutarevich (Poland) F Pieczonka	3	7^{7}	[10]
2	(United Kingdom) J Paris (United Kingdom) M Willis	6	6^{1}	[6]

Final
1	(Switzerland) J Paul (Czech Republic) M Vocel	4	6	[8]
I Liutarevich (Poland) F Pieczonka	6	3	[10]
