= 2025 Play In Challenger – Singles =

Singles
- 2025 Play In Challenger

Final
- Champion: (France) Arthur Bouquier
- Runner-up: (France) Lucas Pouille
- Score: 6–3, 3–5 ret.

Events
Singles	Doubles
- Play In Challenger

Arthur Rinderknech was the defending champion but chose not to defend his title.

Arthur Bouquier won the title after Lucas Pouille retired while trailing 3–6, 5–3 in the final.

== Seeds ==
1. (France) Benjamin Bonzi (second round)
2. (Italy) Luca Nardi (first round)
3. (France) Lucas Pouille (final, retired)
4. (Poland) Kamil Majchrzak (second round)
5. (Belgium) Raphaël Collignon (withdrew)
6. (Switzerland) Jérôme Kym (second round, withdrew)
7. (France) Grégoire Barrère (withdrew)
8. (Belgium) Alexander Blockx (quarterfinals)
9. (Italy) Matteo Gigante (first round)

== Draw ==
Key

- Q = Qualifier
- WC = Wild card
- LL = Lucky loser
- Alt = Alternate
- ITF = ITF entry
- PR = Protected ranking
- SR = Special ranking
- SE = Special exempt
- JE = Junior exempt
- JR = Junior Accelerator Programme entrant
- CO = College Accelerator Programme entrant
- NG = Next Gen Accelerator Program entrant
- w/o = Walkover
- r = Retired
- d = Defaulted

=== Finals ===
Semifinals
Q	(France) Arthur Bouquier	7^{7}	4	6
(France) Calvin Hemery	6^{2}	6	4
3	(France) Lucas Pouille	3	6	6
(France) Valentin Royer	6	4	2

Final
Q	(France) Arthur Bouquier	6	3
3	(France) Lucas Pouille	3	5^{r}

=== Top half ===
First round
1/WC	(France) B Bonzi	6	1	6
(France) P-H Herbert	3	6	4
(France) M Martineau	3	6^{3}
Q	(France) A Bouquier	6	7^{7}
WC	(France) B Paire	3	7	4
LL	(France) T Paris	6	5	6
LL	(France) L Poullain	6	6
9	(Italy) M Gigante	2	3
4	(Poland) K Majchrzak	6	7^{7}
(France) L Van Assche	4	6^{5}
Q	(France) Lucas Marionneau	2	2
(France) C Hemery	6	6
LL	(Germany) MH Rehberg	3	7^{7}	7
Q	(Switzerland) J Paul	6	6^{4}	5
Q	(Germany) P Zahraj	1	6	1
6	(Switzerland) J Kym	6	4	6

Second round
1/WC	(France) B Bonzi	2	7^{7}	3
Q	(France) A Bouquier	6	6^{5}	6
LL	(France) T Paris	7^{7}	6
LL	(France) L Poullain	6^{5}	3
4	(Poland) K Majchrzak	4	3
(France) C Hemery	6	6
LL	(Germany) MH Rehberg	w/o
6	(Switzerland) J Kym

Quarterfinals
Q	(France) A Bouquier	6	6
LL	(France) T Paris	3	1
(France) C Hemery	6	6
LL	(Germany) MH Rehberg	4	0

Semifinals
Q	(France) A Bouquier	7^{7}	4	6
(France) C Hemery	6^{2}	6	4

=== Bottom half ===
First round
8	(Belgium) A Blockx	7	6
Alt	(Tunisia) A Dougaz	5	1
(Romania) FC Jianu	5	3
A Kachmazov	7	6
(France) H Grenier	3	6	6
(France) T Atmane	6	3	4
(France) C Chidekh	7	6^{3}	4
3	(France) L Pouille	5	7^{7}	6
LL	(France) Maé Malige	6	3	7^{7}
(Germany) H Squire	2	6	6^{5}
(Poland) M Kaśnikowski	0	3
(France) V Royer	6	6
WC	(France) A Géa	6	7
Q	(Germany) T Gentzsch	4	5
Q	(Ukraine) O Prihodko	6	7
2/SE	(Italy) L Nardi	3	5

Second round
8	(Belgium) A Blockx	6	6
A Kachmazov	3	4
(France) H Grenier	6^{5}	3
3	(France) L Pouille	7^{7}	6
LL	(France) M Malige	4	6	2
(France) V Royer	6	4	6
WC	(France) A Géa	6	7
Q	(Ukraine) O Prihodko	3	5

Quarterfinals
8	(Belgium) A Blockx	6^{4}	3
3	(France) L Pouille	7^{7}	6
(France) V Royer	7^{7}	6
WC	(France) A Géa	6^{2}	2

Semifinals
3	(France) L Pouille	3	6	6
(France) V Royer	6	4	2
