= 2025 Play In Challenger =

- Date: 3 – 9 February
- Edition: 7th
- Surface: Hard (indoor)
- Location: Lille, France

Champions

Singles
- (France) Arthur Bouquier

Doubles
- (Switzerland) Jakub Paul / (Netherlands) David Pel
- Play In Challenger

The 2025 Play In Challenger was a professional tennis tournament played on indoor hard courts. It was the seventh edition of the tournament, which was part of the 2025 ATP Challenger Tour. It took place in Lille, France, between 3 and 9 February 2025.

== Singles main-draw entrants ==
=== Seeds ===
Country	Player	Rank^{1}	Seed
FRA	Benjamin Bonzi	62	1
ITA	Luca Nardi	83	2
FRA	Lucas Pouille	104	3
POL	Kamil Majchrzak	115	4
~~BEL~~	~~Raphaël Collignon~~	~~124~~	~~5~~
SUI	Jérôme Kym	136	6
~~FRA~~	~~Grégoire Barrère~~	~~144~~	~~7~~
BEL	Alexander Blockx	146	8
ITA	Matteo Gigante	150	9

- ^{1} Rankings are as of 27 January 2025.

=== Other entrants ===
The following players received wildcards into the singles main draw:

- (France) Benjamin Bonzi
- (France) Arthur Géa
- (France) Benoît Paire

The following player received entry into the singles main draw as a special exempt:

- (Italy) Luca Nardi

The following player received entry into the singles main draw as an alternate:

- (Tunisia) Aziz Dougaz

The following players received entry from the qualifying draw:

- (France) Arthur Bouquier
- (Germany) Tom Gentzsch
- (France) Lucas Marionneau
- (Switzerland) Jakub Paul
- (Ukraine) Oleg Prihodko
- (Germany) Patrick Zahraj

The following players received entry as lucky losers:

- (France) Maé Malige
- (France) Tom Paris
- (France) Lucas Poullain
- (Germany) Max Hans Rehberg

== Champions ==
=== Singles ===
- (France) Arthur Bouquier def. (France) Lucas Pouille 6–3, 3–5 retired.

=== Doubles ===
- (Switzerland) Jakub Paul / (Netherlands) David Pel def. (Poland) Karol Drzewiecki / (Poland) Piotr Matuszewski 6–3, 6–4.
