= 2026 Play In Challenger =

- Date: 16 – 22 February
- Edition: 8th
- Surface: Hard (indoor)
- Location: Lille, France

Champions

Singles
- (France) Luca Van Assche

Doubles
- Ivan Liutarevich / (Poland) Filip Pieczonka
- Play In Challenger

The 2026 Play In Challenger was a professional tennis tournament played on indoor hard courts. It was the eighth edition of the tournament, which was part of the 2026 ATP Challenger Tour. It took place in Lille, France, between 16 and 22 February 2026.

== Singles main-draw entrants ==
=== Seeds ===
Country	Player	Rank^{1}	Seed
AUT	Filip Misolic	76	1
GBR	Jacob Fearnley	87	2
FRA	Hugo Gaston	99	3
BEL	Alexander Blockx	103	4
BEL	David Goffin	117	5
FRA	Titouan Droguet	120	6
FRA	Luca Van Assche	126	7
FRA	Benjamin Bonzi	131	8

- ^{1} Rankings are as of 9 February 2026.

=== Other entrants ===
The following players received wildcards into the singles main draw:

- (France) Arthur Bouquier
- (France) Titouan Droguet
- (France) Moïse Kouamé

The following player received entry into the singles main draw as a special exempt:

- (South Africa) Lloyd Harris

The following player received entry into the singles main draw through the Next Gen Accelerator programme:

- (Austria) Joel Schwärzler

The following player received entry into the singles main draw as an alternate:

- (Estonia) Daniil Glinka

The following players received entry from the qualifying draw:

- (United States) Nishesh Basavareddy
- (Belgium) Kimmer Coppejans
- (Croatia) Matej Dodig
- (France) Calvin Hemery
- (Kazakhstan) Mikhail Kukushkin
- (France) Loann Massard

== Champions ==
=== Singles ===
- (France) Luca Van Assche def. (Belgium) Alexander Blockx 6–2, 6–4.

=== Doubles ===
- Ivan Liutarevich / (Poland) Filip Pieczonka def. (Switzerland) Jakub Paul / (Czech Republic) Matěj Vocel 6–4, 3–6, [10–8].
