= 2025 Play In Challenger – Doubles =

Doubles
- 2025 Play In Challenger

Final
- Champions: (Switzerland) Jakub Paul (Netherlands) David Pel
- Runners-up: (Poland) Karol Drzewiecki (Poland) Piotr Matuszewski
- Score: 6–3, 6–4

Events
Singles	Doubles
- Play In Challenger

Christian Harrison and Marcus Willis were the defending champions but only Willis chose to defend his title, partnering Patrik Trhac. They lost in the quarterfinals to Jakub Paul and David Pel.

Paul and Pel won the title after defeating Karol Drzewiecki and Piotr Matuszewski 6–3, 6–4 in the final.

== Seeds ==
1. (India) Sriram Balaji / (Portugal) Francisco Cabral (semifinals)
2. (Monaco) Romain Arneodo / (France) Manuel Guinard (quarterfinals, retired)
3. (Poland) Karol Drzewiecki / (Poland) Piotr Matuszewski (final)
4. (United States) Patrik Trhac / (United Kingdom) Marcus Willis (quarterfinals)

== Draw ==
Key

- Q = Qualifier
- WC = Wild card
- LL = Lucky loser
- Alt = Alternate
- ITF = ITF entry
- PR = Protected ranking
- SR = Special ranking
- SE = Special exempt
- JE = Junior exempt
- JR = Junior Accelerator Programme entrant
- CO = College Accelerator Programme entrant
- NG = Next Gen Accelerator Program entrant
- w/o = Walkover
- r = Retired
- d = Defaulted

=== Draw ===
First round
1	(India) S Balaji (Portugal) F Cabral	4	7	[10]
WC	(France) A Bouquier (France) A Géa	6	5	[4]
(Czech Republic) Jiří Barnat (Czech Republic) F Duda	6	4	[11]
(Canada) C Harper (United Kingdom) D Stevenson	4	6	[9]
4	(United States) P Trhac (United Kingdom) M Willis	6	4	[10]
(Finland) P Niklas-Salminen (United States) R Stalder	1	6	[7]
(Switzerland) J Paul (Netherlands) D Pel	6	6
(Bulgaria) A Donski (Spain) B Pujol Navarro	1	4
WC	(Belgium) J De Loore (Belgium) N Desein	0	4
(Germany) D Masur (Poland) S Walków	6	6
(Israel) D Cukierman (United Kingdom) J Paris	3	5
3	(Poland) K Drzewiecki (Poland) P Matuszewski	6	7
(France) D Added (United States) V Kirkov	4	6	[5]
(Romania) V Cornea (Spain) S Martos Gornés	6	4	[10]
Alt	A Kachmazov (Japan) K Uchida	2	4
2	(Monaco) R Arneodo (France) M Guinard	6	6

Quarterfinals
1	(India) S Balaji (Portugal) F Cabral	6	6
(Czech Republic) J Barnat (Czech Republic) F Duda	3	4
4	(United States) P Trhac (United Kingdom) M Willis	3	6^{3}
(Switzerland) J Paul (Netherlands) D Pel	6	7^{7}
(Germany) D Masur (Poland) S Walków	4	4
3	(Poland) K Drzewiecki (Poland) P Matuszewski	6	6
(Romania) V Cornea (Spain) S Martos Gornés	7	0
2	(Monaco) R Arneodo (France) M Guinard	5	0^{r}

Semifinals
1	(India) S Balaji (Portugal) F Cabral	2	7^{9}	[8]
(Switzerland) J Paul (Netherlands) D Pel	6	6^{7}	[10]
3	(Poland) K Drzewiecki (Poland) P Matuszewski	7	6
(Romania) V Cornea (Spain) S Martos Gornés	5	4

Final
(Switzerland) J Paul (Netherlands) D Pel	6	6
3	(Poland) K Drzewiecki (Poland) P Matuszewski	3	4
