= 2018 Play In Challenger – Singles =

Singles
- 2018 Play In Challenger

Final
- Champion: (France) Grégoire Barrère
- Runner-up: (Germany) Tobias Kamke
- Score: 6–1, 6–4

Events
Singles	Doubles
- Play In Challenger

This was the first edition of the tournament.

Grégoire Barrère won the title after defeating Tobias Kamke 6–1, 6–4 in the final.

== Seeds ==
1. (France) Nicolas Mahut (second round)
2. (France) Quentin Halys (second round)
3. (Germany) Yannick Maden (semifinals)
4. (Germany) Oscar Otte (first round)
5. (France) Corentin Moutet (second round)
6. (France) Stéphane Robert (second round)
7. (Germany) Mats Moraing (withdrew)
8. (Germany) Matthias Bachinger (second round)

== Draw ==
Key

- Q = Qualifier
- WC = Wild card
- LL = Lucky loser
- Alt = Alternate
- ITF = ITF entry
- PR = Protected ranking
- SR = Special ranking
- SE = Special exempt
- JE = Junior exempt
- JR = Junior Accelerator Programme entrant
- CO = College Accelerator Programme entrant
- NG = Next Gen Accelerator Program entrant
- w/o = Walkover
- r = Retired
- d = Defaulted

=== Finals ===
Semifinals
Q	(France) Grégoire Barrère	6	2	6
3	(Germany) Yannick Maden	2	6	3
(Germany) Tobias Kamke	7^{7}	6
WC	(France) Maxime Janvier	6^{5}	4

Final
Q	(France) Grégoire Barrère	6	6
(Germany) Tobias Kamke	1	4

=== Top half ===
First round
1	(France) N Mahut	7	6
(Italy) A Arnaboldi	5	3
Q	(Spain) G Olaso	5	6	6
WC	(Belgium) Y Mertens	7	1	3
(Spain) B Zapata Miralles	4	3
Q	(France) G Barrère	6	6
(Bosnia and Herzegovina) A Šetkić	2	6	6^{5}
6	(France) S Robert	6	3	7^{7}
3	(Germany) Y Maden	6	6
(Australia) B Mousley	2	2
WC	(France) U Humbert	7^{7}	7
(Egypt) M Safwat	6^{5}	5
Q	(France) D Guez	6	3	6
(Portugal) G Oliveira	1	6	3
(Serbia) N Milojević	4^{r}
8	(Germany) M Bachinger	5

Second round
1	(France) N Mahut	6^{4}	7^{7}	3
Q	(Spain) G Olaso	7^{7}	6^{4}	6
Q	(France) G Barrère	2	7	7^{8}
6	(France) S Robert	6	5	6^{6}
3	(Germany) Y Maden	7	4	6
WC	(France) U Humbert	5	6	1
Q	(France) D Guez	6	6
8	(Germany) M Bachinger	2	2

Quarterfinals
Q	(Spain) G Olaso	0	1
Q	(France) G Barrère	6	6
3	(Germany) Y Maden	6	7^{7}
Q	(France) D Guez	1	6^{0}

Semifinals
Q	(France) G Barrère	6	2	6
3	(Germany) Y Maden	2	6	3

=== Bottom half ===
First round
LL	(Lithuania) L Grigelis	6	7^{7}
(Italy) L Giustino	4	6^{2}
(France) A Hoang	6	2	6
(Australia) B Tomic	2	6	4
(Germany) T Kamke	6	6
(Belarus) U Ignatik	4	3
(France) C Lestienne	6	6
4	(Germany) O Otte	4	1
5	(France) C Moutet	4	6	6
Q	(France) A Escoffier	6	3	2
(France) V Millot	5	6	5
WC	(France) H Grenier	7	1	7
(Israel) E Leshem	1	2
WC	(France) M Janvier	6	6
(France) K de Schepper	6	3	3
2	(France) Q Halys	3	6	6

Second round
LL	(Lithuania) L Grigelis	4	6	4
(France) A Hoang	6	2	6
(Germany) T Kamke	6	7^{7}
(France) C Lestienne	0	6^{4}
5	(France) C Moutet	2	5
WC	(France) H Grenier	6	7
WC	(France) M Janvier	6	6
2	(France) Q Halys	2	4

Quarterfinals
(France) A Hoang	1	6	3
(Germany) T Kamke	6	3	6
WC	(France) H Grenier	4	4
WC	(France) M Janvier	6	6

Semifinals
(Germany) T Kamke	7^{7}	6
WC	(France) M Janvier	6^{5}	4
