= 2021 Play In Challenger – Singles =

Singles
- 2021 Play In Challenger

Final
- Champion: (Belgium) Zizou Bergs
- Runner-up: (France) Grégoire Barrère
- Score: 4–6, 6–1, 7–6^{(7–5)}

Events
Singles	Doubles
← 2019 ·	Play In Challenger	· 2022 →

Grégoire Barrère was the defending champion but lost in the final to Zizou Bergs.

Bergs won the title after defeating Barrère 4–6, 6–1, 7–6^{(7–5)} in the final.

== Seeds ==
1. (France) Grégoire Barrère (final)
2. (France) Benjamin Bonzi (quarterfinals)
3. (France) Arthur Rinderknech (quarterfinals)
4. (France) Antoine Hoang (second round)
5. (Germany) Oscar Otte (first round)
6. (France) Alexandre Müller (first round)
7. (Germany) Maximilian Marterer (first round)
8. (France) Quentin Halys (semifinals)

== Draw ==
=== Key ===
- Q = Qualifier
- WC = Wild card
- LL = Lucky loser
- Alt = Alternate
- SE = Special exempt
- PR = Protected ranking
- ITF = ITF entry
- JE = Junior exempt
- w/o = Walkover
- r = Retired
- d = Defaulted
- SR = Special ranking

=== Finals ===
Semifinals
1	(France) Grégoire Barrère	4	7	6
(France) Maxime Janvier	6	5	2
Q	(Belgium) Zizou Bergs	1	6	6
8	(France) Quentin Halys	6	3	3

Final
1	(France) Grégoire Barrère	6	1	6^{5}
Q	(Belgium) Zizou Bergs	4	6	7^{7}

=== Top half ===
First round
1	(France) G Barrère	6	6^{5}	6
(Czech Republic) V Šafránek	4	7^{7}	0
(France) M Bourgue	7^{7}	6^{2}	4
PR	(Germany) D Brown	6^{2}	7^{7}	6
(Argentina) P Cachin	2	6	3
(Czech Republic) J Forejtek	6	4	6
(Italy) G Zeppieri	7^{7}	6
5	(Germany) O Otte	6^{3}	3
3	(France) A Rinderknech	6	5	6
(Belgium) M Geerts	3	7	3
Q	(France) M Martineau	3	2
(Spain) N Kuhn	6	6
(France) M Janvier	3	6	6
(Norway) V Durasovic	6	3	2
LL	(Romania) FC Jianu	2	6	7
6	(France) A Müller	6	2	5

Second round
1	(France) G Barrère	6	7
PR	(Germany) D Brown	3	5
(Czech Republic) J Forejtek	6	6
(Italy) G Zeppieri	3	4
3	(France) A Rinderknech	6	6
(Spain) N Kuhn	3	1
(France) M Janvier	6^{5}	6	6
LL	(Romania) FC Jianu	7^{7}	3	3

Quarterfinals
1	(France) G Barrère	6^{6}	6	7^{7}
(Czech Republic) J Forejtek	7^{8}	3	6^{4}
3	(France) A Rinderknech	4	6^{5}
(France) M Janvier	6	7^{7}

Semifinals
1	(France) G Barrère	4	7	6
(France) M Janvier	6	5	2

=== Bottom half ===
First round
7	(Germany) M Marterer	4	1
Q	(Belgium) Z Bergs	6	6
(Germany) T Kamke	7	6
(Germany) M Moraing	5	3
(Italy) A Arnaboldi	7^{7}	6
(France) M Guinard	6^{3}	0
Alt	(France) M Hamou	1	3
4	(France) A Hoang	6	6
8	(France) Q Halys	6	6
WC	(France) A Cazaux	3	2
Q	(France) Baptiste Crepatte	2	4
WC	(France) Lilian Marmousez	6	6
(France) T Lamasine	4	6	6
Q	(France) Jurgen Briand	6	3	4
WC	(France) E Furness	7	4	3
2	(France) B Bonzi	5	6	6

Second round
Q	(Belgium) Z Bergs	6	3	6
(Germany) T Kamke	3	6	3
(Italy) A Arnaboldi	6	5	6
4	(France) A Hoang	2	7	3
8	(France) Q Halys	6	7
WC	(France) L Marmousez	3	5
(France) T Lamasine	4	3
2	(France) B Bonzi	6	6

Quarterfinals
Q	(Belgium) Z Bergs	4
(Italy) A Arnaboldi	2^{r}
8	(France) Q Halys	6	6
2	(France) B Bonzi	4	3

Semifinals
Q	(Belgium) Z Bergs	1	6	6
8	(France) Q Halys	6	3	3
