= 2024 Play In Challenger =

- Date: 26 February – 3 March
- Edition: 6th
- Surface: Hard (indoor)
- Location: Lille, France

Champions

Singles
- (France) Arthur Rinderknech

Doubles
- (United States) Christian Harrison / (United Kingdom) Marcus Willis
- Play In Challenger

The 2024 Play In Challenger was a professional tennis tournament played on indoor hard courts. It was the sixth edition of the tournament, which was part of the 2024 ATP Challenger Tour. It took place in Lille, France, between 26 February and 3 March 2024.

== Singles main-draw entrants ==
=== Seeds ===
Country	Player	Rank^{1}	Seed
FRA	Arthur Rinderknech	86	1
~~USA~~	~~Brandon Nakashima~~	~~90~~	~~2~~
FRA	Benoît Paire	111	3
BEL	Zizou Bergs	124	4
FRA	Grégoire Barrère	125	5
MDA	Radu Albot	150	6
GER	Benjamin Hassan	152	7
FRA	Giovanni Mpetshi Perricard	162	8

- ^{1} Rankings are as of 19 February 2024.

=== Other entrants ===
The following players received wildcards into the singles main draw:

- (France) Arthur Géa
- (France) Benoît Paire
- (France) Lucas Pouille

The following players received entry into the singles main draw as alternates:

- (Italy) Mattia Bellucci
- (Estonia) Mark Lajal

The following players received entry from the qualifying draw:

- (France) Arthur Bouquier
- (Belgium) Michael Geerts
- (France) Manuel Guinard
- (France) Tristan Lamasine
- (Syria) Hazem Naw
- (Germany) Henri Squire

The following player received entry as a lucky loser:

- (Germany) Oscar Otte

== Champions ==
=== Singles ===
- (France) Arthur Rinderknech def. (Belgium) Joris De Loore 6–4, 3–6, 7–6^{(10–8)}.

=== Doubles ===
- (United States) Christian Harrison / (United Kingdom) Marcus Willis def. (France) Titouan Droguet / (France) Giovanni Mpetshi Perricard 7–6^{(8–6)}, 6–3.
