= 2023 Play In Challenger =

- Date: 27 March – 2 April
- Edition: 5th
- Surface: Hard (indoor)
- Location: Lille, France

Champions

Singles
- (Finland) Otto Virtanen

Doubles
- (Australia) Max Purcell / (Australia) Jason Taylor
← 2022 ·	Play In Challenger	· 2024 →

The 2023 Play In Challenger was a professional tennis tournament played on indoor hard courts. It was the fifth edition of the tournament, which was part of the 2023 ATP Challenger Tour. It took place in Lille, France, between 27 March and 2 April 2023.

== Singles main-draw entrants ==
=== Seeds ===
Country	Player	Rank^{1}	Seed
AUS	Max Purcell	99	1
AUT	Jurij Rodionov	131	2
SVK	Norbert Gombos	133	3
FIN	Otto Virtanen	139	4
FRA	Hugo Grenier	146	5
FRA	Benoît Paire	170	6
CZE	Zdeněk Kolář	174	7
FRA	Antoine Escoffier	180	8

- ^{1} Rankings are as of 20 March 2023.

=== Other entrants ===
The following players received wildcards into the singles main draw:

- (France) Sascha Gueymard Wayenburg
- (France) ~~Pierre-Hugues Herbert~~
- (France) Kyrian Jacquet

The following players received entry into the singles main draw as special exempts:

- (France) Dan Added
- (Lithuania) Ričardas Berankis

The following players received entry into the singles main draw as alternates:

- (Tunisia) Aziz Dougaz
- (France) Harold Mayot
- (Poland) Kacper Żuk

The following players received entry from the qualifying draw:

- (France) Kenny de Schepper
- (France) Antoine Hoang
- (France) Maxime Janvier
- (Israel) Edan Leshem
- (Ukraine) Vitaliy Sachko
- (Kazakhstan) Beibit Zhukayev

The following player received entry as a lucky loser:

- (Turkey) Cem İlkel

== Champions ==
=== Singles ===
- (Finland) Otto Virtanen def. (Australia) Max Purcell 6–7^{(3–7)}, 6–4, 6–2.

=== Doubles ===
- (Australia) Max Purcell / (Australia) Jason Taylor def. (Jamaica) Dustin Brown / (Pakistan) Aisam-ul-Haq Qureshi 7–6^{(7–3)}, 6–4.
