= 2018 Play In Challenger – Doubles =

Doubles
- 2018 Play In Challenger

Final
- Champions: (France) Hugo Nys (Germany) Tim Pütz
- Runners-up: (India) Jeevan Nedunchezhiyan (India) Purav Raja
- Score: 7–6^{(7–3)}, 1–6, [10–7]

Events
Singles	Doubles
- Play In Challenger

This was the first edition of the tournament.

Hugo Nys and Tim Pütz won the title after defeating Jeevan Nedunchezhiyan and Purav Raja 7–6^{(7–3)}, 1–6, [10–7] in the final.

== Seeds ==
1. (Czech Republic) Roman Jebavý / (Croatia) Antonio Šančić (quarterfinals)
2. (Israel) Jonathan Erlich / (United Kingdom) Ken Skupski (quarterfinals)
3. (Germany) Andre Begemann / (Romania) Florin Mergea (first round, retired)
4. (India) Jeevan Nedunchezhiyan / (India) Purav Raja (final)

== Draw ==
Key

- Q = Qualifier
- WC = Wild card
- LL = Lucky loser
- Alt = Alternate
- ITF = ITF entry
- PR = Protected ranking
- SR = Special ranking
- SE = Special exempt
- JE = Junior exempt
- JR = Junior Accelerator Programme entrant
- CO = College Accelerator Programme entrant
- NG = Next Gen Accelerator Program entrant
- w/o = Walkover
- r = Retired
- d = Defaulted

First round
1	(Czech Republic) R Jebavý (Croatia) A Šančić	7^{8}	6
(Thailand) Sa Ratiwatana (Thailand) So Ratiwatana	6^{6}	4
(United Kingdom) L Bambridge (United Kingdom) J Salisbury	6	3	[10]
WC	(Belgium) N Desein (Belgium) Y Mertens	3	6	[5]
4	(India) J Nedunchezhiyan (India) P Raja	4	6	[11]
(Netherlands) S Arends (Austria) T-S Weissborn	6	1	[9]
WC	(France) Q Halys (France) U Humbert	6^{3}	6	[10]
(Uruguay) A Behar (Portugal) G Oliveira	7^{7}	4	[8]
(France) H Nys (Germany) T Pütz	6	6
WC	(France) D Descloix (France) C Moutet	4	3
(Australia) B Mousley (Australia) B Tomic	7^{8}	1
3	(Germany) A Begemann (Romania) F Mergea	6^{6}	0^{r}
(Poland) T Bednarek (France) S Robert	6	3	[10]
(United Kingdom) S Clayton (Netherlands) D Pel	3	6	[2]
(Switzerland) L Margaroli (Germany) A Mies	6	1	[3]
2	(Israel) J Erlich (United Kingdom) K Skupski	4	6	[10]

Quarterfinals
1	(Czech Republic) R Jebavý (Croatia) A Šančić	6^{4}	2
(United Kingdom) L Bambridge (United Kingdom) J Salisbury	7^{7}	6
4	(India) J Nedunchezhiyan (India) P Raja	w/o
WC	(France) Q Halys (France) U Humbert
(France) H Nys (Germany) T Pütz	6	6
(Australia) B Mousley (Australia) B Tomic	3	1
(Poland) T Bednarek (France) S Robert	4	7	[10]
2	(Israel) J Erlich (United Kingdom) K Skupski	6	5	[7]

Semifinals
(United Kingdom) L Bambridge (United Kingdom) J Salisbury	6^{2}	4
4	(India) J Nedunchezhiyan (India) P Raja	7^{7}	6
(France) H Nys (Germany) T Pütz	6	6
(Poland) T Bednarek (France) S Robert	2	3

Final
4	(India) J Nedunchezhiyan (India) P Raja	6^{3}	6	[7]
(France) H Nys (Germany) T Pütz	7^{7}	1	[10]
