= 2022 Play In Challenger – Doubles =

Doubles
- 2022 Play In Challenger

Final
- Champions: (Norway) Viktor Durasovic (Finland) Patrik Niklas-Salminen
- Runners-up: (France) Jonathan Eysseric (France) Quentin Halys
- Score: 7–5, 7–6^{(7–1)}

Events
Singles	Doubles
- Play In Challenger

Benjamin Bonzi and Antoine Hoang were the defending champions but only Hoang chose to defend his title, partnering Romain Arneodo. Hoang lost in the quarterfinals to Jonathan Eysseric and Quentin Halys.

Viktor Durasovic and Patrik Niklas-Salminen won the title after defeating Eysseric and Halys 7–5, 7–6^{(7–1)} in the final.

== Seeds ==
1. (United Kingdom) Jonny O'Mara / (United Kingdom) Ken Skupski (semifinals)
2. (Netherlands) Sander Arends / (Netherlands) David Pel (quarterfinals)
3. (Monaco) Romain Arneodo / (France) Antoine Hoang (quarterfinals)
4. (Spain) Sergio Martos Gornés / (New Zealand) Artem Sitak (first round)

== Draw ==
Key

- Q = Qualifier
- WC = Wild card
- LL = Lucky loser
- Alt = Alternate
- ITF = ITF entry
- PR = Protected ranking
- SR = Special ranking
- SE = Special exempt
- JE = Junior exempt
- JR = Junior Accelerator Programme entrant
- CO = College Accelerator Programme entrant
- NG = Next Gen Accelerator Program entrant
- w/o = Walkover
- r = Retired
- d = Defaulted

First round
1	(United Kingdom) J O'Mara (United Kingdom) K Skupski	w/o
(France) E Couacaud (France) T Lamasine
(Germany) B Hassan (Germany) H Jebens	6	7
(Netherlands) R Haase (Netherlands) M Hermans	2	5
3	(Monaco) R Arneodo (France) A Hoang	6	7^{8}
Alt	(Germany) M Rosenkranz (Germany) H Squire	4	6^{6}
(France) J Eysseric (France) Q Halys	w/o
(Poland) P Matuszewski (Ukraine) V Sachko
(France) M Janvier (Japan) K Uchida	7	7^{10}
R Safiullin (Netherlands) M Vervoort	5	6^{8}
PR	(Norway) V Durasovic (Finland) P Niklas-Salminen	6	7^{7}
4	(Spain) S Martos Gornés (New Zealand) A Sitak	2	6^{4}
(Bosnia and Herzegovina) M Bašić (France) G Blancaneaux	w/o
WC	(France) S Gueymard Wayenburg (France) L Van Assche
(Belgium) Z Bergs (Belgium) M Geerts	2	4
2	(Netherlands) S Arends (Netherlands) D Pel	6	6

Quarterfinals
1	(United Kingdom) J O'Mara (United Kingdom) K Skupski	2	6	[10]
(Germany) B Hassan (Germany) H Jebens	6	3	[8]
3	(Monaco) R Arneodo (France) A Hoang	4	6^{1}
(France) J Eysseric (France) Q Halys	6	7^{7}
(France) M Janvier (Japan) K Uchida	6	6^{4}	[6]
PR	(Norway) V Durasovic (Finland) P Niklas-Salminen	1	7^{7}	[10]
(Bosnia and Herzegovina) M Bašić (France) G Blancaneaux	1	7	[10]
2	(Netherlands) S Arends (Netherlands) D Pel	6	5	[8]

Semifinals
1	(United Kingdom) J O'Mara (United Kingdom) K Skupski	6	6^{1}	[8]
(France) J Eysseric (France) Q Halys	4	7^{7}	[10]
PR	(Norway) V Durasovic (Finland) P Niklas-Salminen	6	7^{7}
(Bosnia and Herzegovina) M Bašić (France) G Blancaneaux	3	6^{5}

Final
(France) J Eysseric (France) Q Halys	5	6^{1}
PR	(Norway) V Durasovic (Finland) P Niklas-Salminen	7	7^{7}
