= Adam Taylor (tennis) =

Australian tennis player (born 1991)

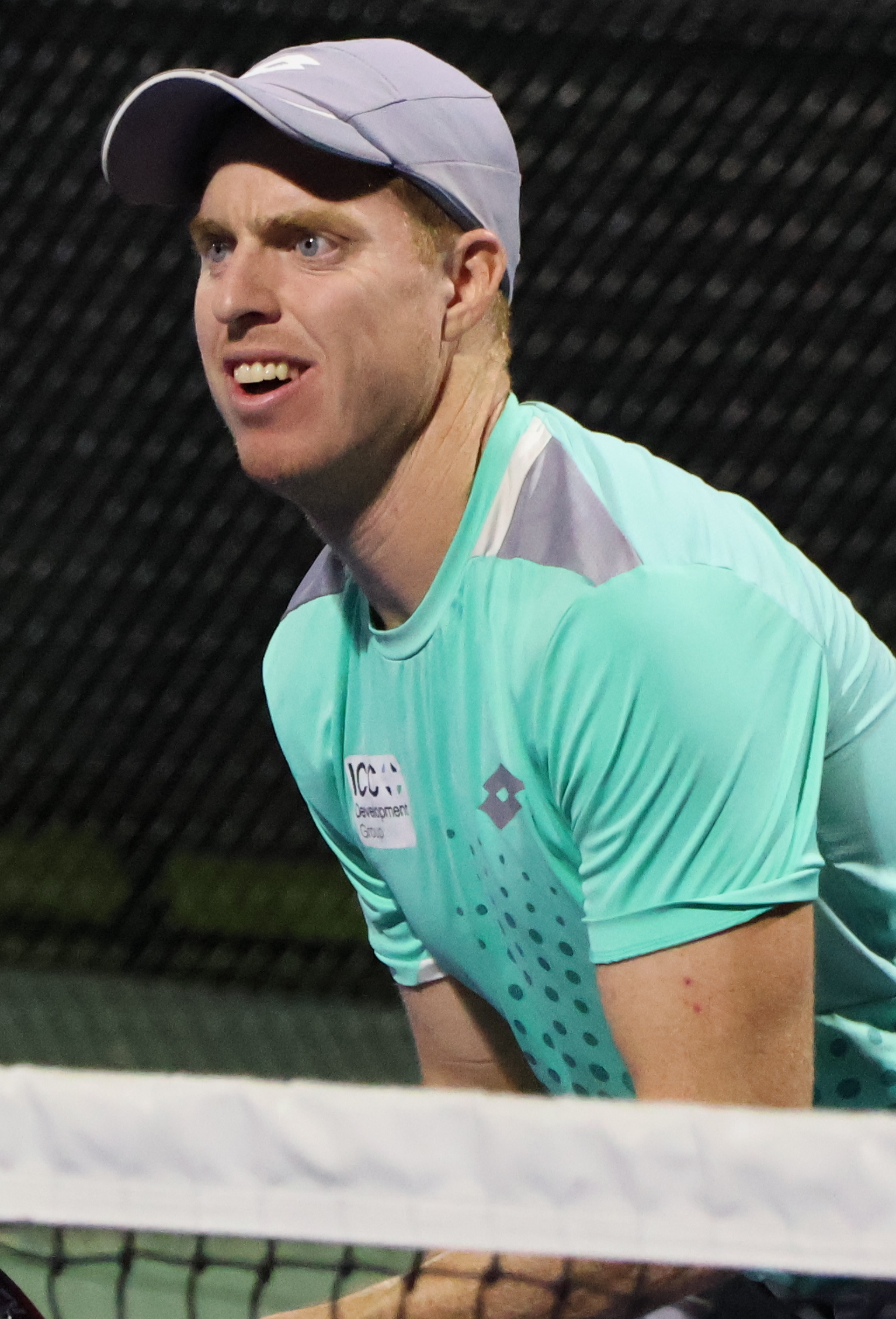
- Taylor at the 2023 Cary Challenger II
- Country (sports): Australia
- Born: 23 June 1991 (age 34) Port Macquarie, Australia
- Height: 1.78 m (5 ft 10 in)
- Plays: Right-Handed (One-Handed Backhand)
- Coach: Steve Taylor
- Prize money: $55,812

Singles
- Career record: 0–0 (at ATP Tour level, Grand Slam level, and in Davis Cup)
- Career titles: 0

Doubles
- Career record: 0–2 (at ATP Tour level, Grand Slam level, and in Davis Cup)
- Career titles: 5 ITF
- Highest ranking: No. 195 (8 April 2024)

Adam Taylor (born 23 June 1991) is an Australian tennis player.

Taylor has a career high ATP doubles ranking of No. 195 achieved on 8 April 2024.

Taylor made his ATP main draw debut at the 2022 Adelaide International 1 after receiving a wildcard into the doubles main draw with his brother Jason Taylor.
