= 2021 Play In Challenger =

- Date: 22–28 March
- Edition: 3rd
- Surface: Hard (Indoor)
- Location: Lille, France

Champions

Singles
- (Belgium) Zizou Bergs

Doubles
- (France) Benjamin Bonzi / (France) Antoine Hoang
← 2019 ·	Play In Challenger	· 2022 →

The 2021 Play In Challenger was a professional tennis tournament played on indoor hard courts. It was the third edition of the tournament which was part of the 2021 ATP Challenger Tour. It took place in Lille, France, between 22 and 28 March 2021.

== Singles main-draw entrants ==
=== Seeds ===
Country	Player	Rank^{1}	Seed
FRA	Grégoire Barrère	116	1
FRA	Benjamin Bonzi	126	2
FRA	Arthur Rinderknech	127	3
FRA	Antoine Hoang	131	4
GER	Oscar Otte	153	5
FRA	Alexandre Müller	197	6
GER	Maximilian Marterer	209	7
FRA	Quentin Halys	212	8

- ^{1} Rankings are as of 15 March 2021.

=== Other entrants ===
The following players received wildcards into the singles main draw:

- (France) Arthur Cazaux
- (France) Evan Furness
- (France) Lilian Marmousez

The following player received entry into the singles main draw using a protected ranking:

- (Germany) Dustin Brown

The following player received entry into the singles main draw as an alternate:

- (France) Maxime Hamou

The following players received entry from the qualifying draw:

- (Belgium) Zizou Bergs
- (France) Jurgen Briand
- (France) Baptiste Crepatte
- (France) Matteo Martineau

The following player received entry as a lucky loser:

- (Romania) Filip Cristian Jianu

== Champions ==
=== Singles ===
- (Belgium) Zizou Bergs def. (France) Grégoire Barrère 4–6, 6–1, 7–6^{(7–5)}.

=== Doubles ===
- (France) Benjamin Bonzi / (France) Antoine Hoang def. (France) Dan Added / (Belgium) Michael Geerts 6–3, 6–1.
