= 2023 Play In Challenger – Singles =

Singles
- 2023 Play In Challenger

Final
- Champion: (Finland) Otto Virtanen
- Runner-up: (Australia) Max Purcell
- Score: 6–7^{(3–7)}, 6–4, 6–2

Events
Singles	Doubles
- Play In Challenger

Quentin Halys was the defending champion but chose not to defend his title.

Otto Virtanen won the title after defeating Max Purcell 6–7^{(3–7)}, 6–4, 6–2 in the final.

== Seeds ==
1. (Australia) Max Purcell (final)
2. (Austria) Jurij Rodionov (semifinals)
3. (Slovakia) Norbert Gombos (first round)
4. (Finland) Otto Virtanen (champion)
5. (France) Hugo Grenier (first round)
6. (France) Benoît Paire (first round)
7. (Czech Republic) Zdeněk Kolář (first round)
8. (France) Antoine Escoffier (first round)

== Draw ==
Key

- Q = Qualifier
- WC = Wild card
- LL = Lucky loser
- Alt = Alternate
- ITF = ITF entry
- PR = Protected ranking
- SR = Special ranking
- SE = Special exempt
- JE = Junior exempt
- JR = Junior Accelerator Programme entrant
- CO = College Accelerator Programme entrant
- NG = Next Gen Accelerator Program entrant
- w/o = Walkover
- r = Retired
- d = Defaulted

=== Finals ===
Semifinals
1	(Australia) Max Purcell	7^{8}	6
(Belgium) Michael Geerts	6^{6}	3
4	(Finland) Otto Virtanen	6	6
2	(Austria) Jurij Rodionov	3	1

Final
1	(Australia) Max Purcell	7^{7}	4	2
4	(Finland) Otto Virtanen	6^{3}	6	6

=== Top half ===
First round
1	(Australia) M Purcell	7^{7}	2	7^{7}
Q	(Kazakhstan) B Zhukayev	6^{1}	6	6^{5}
Q	(Israel) E Leshem	3	3
Alt	(France) H Mayot	6	6
Q	(France) M Janvier	7	0	6
(Australia) O Jasika	5	6	2
(Belgium) R Collignon	6	3	6
6	(France) B Paire	2	6	4
3	(Slovakia) N Gombos	4	3
(Belgium) M Geerts	6	6
WC	(France) K Jacquet	5	7^{7}	6
WC	(France) S Gueymard Wayenburg	7	6^{1}	4
LL	(Turkey) C İlkel	6	6
(Belgium) G Onclin	3	2
(Turkey) A Çelikbilek	6	6
8	(France) A Escoffier	4	2

Second round
1	(Australia) M Purcell	7^{7}	7
Alt	(France) H Mayot	6^{5}	5
Q	(France) M Janvier	3	6	6
(Belgium) R Collignon	6	3	2
(Belgium) M Geerts	6	6
WC	(France) K Jacquet	3	1
LL	(Turkey) C İlkel	6^{3}	4
(Turkey) A Çelikbilek	7^{7}	6

Quarterfinals
1	(Australia) M Purcell	6
Q	(France) M Janvier	6^{r}
(Belgium) M Geerts	6^{6}	6	6
(Turkey) A Çelikbilek	7^{8}	4	2

Semifinals
1	(Australia) M Purcell	7^{8}	6
(Belgium) M Geerts	6^{6}	3

=== Bottom half ===
First round
7	(Czech Republic) Z Kolář	1	0
Q	(Ukraine) V Sachko	6	6
(France) E Furness	4	0^{r}
Alt	(Poland) K Żuk	6	4
SE	(France) D Added	2	3
Q	(France) A Hoang	6	6
(Bulgaria) D Kuzmanov	3	6	2
4	(Finland) O Virtanen	6	4	6
5	(France) H Grenier	6	4	2
(Canada) G Diallo	4	6	6
Alt	(Tunisia) A Dougaz	1	5
SE	(Lithuania) R Berankis	6	7
(Kazakhstan) M Kukushkin	2	3
Q	(France) K de Schepper	6	6
(Australia) L Tu	7	2	2
2	(Austria) J Rodionov	5	6	6

Second round
Q	(Ukraine) V Sachko	6	4	7
Alt	(Poland) K Żuk	4	6	5
Q	(France) A Hoang	6^{4}	3
4	(Finland) O Virtanen	7^{7}	6
(Canada) G Diallo	6	7
SE	(Lithuania) R Berankis	3	5
Q	(France) K de Schepper	4	4
2	(Austria) J Rodionov	6	6

Quarterfinals
Q	(Ukraine) V Sachko	2	4
4	(Finland) O Virtanen	6	6
(Canada) G Diallo	6	5	1
2	(Austria) J Rodionov	2	7	6

Semifinals
4	(Finland) O Virtanen	6	6
2	(Austria) J Rodionov	3	1
