= Jason Taylor (tennis) =

Australian tennis player (born 1994)

- Country (sports): Australia
- Born: 23 February 1994 (age 32) Port Macquarie, Australia
- Height: 1.80 m (5 ft 11 in)
- Plays: Right handed (two-handed backhand)
- Coach: Steve Taylor
- Prize money: $49,781

Doubles
- Career record: 0–2 (at ATP Tour level, Grand Slam level, and in Davis Cup)
- Career titles: 0; 2 Challenger, 10 Futures
- Highest ranking: No. 160 (7 August 2023)

Jason Taylor (born 23 February 1994) is an Australian tennis player.

Taylor has a career high ATP doubles ranking of No. 160 achieved on 7 August 2023.

Taylor made his ATP main draw debut at the 2022 Adelaide International 1 after receiving a wildcard into the doubles main draw with his brother Adam Taylor.

He won his maiden Challenger title at the 2023 Play In Challenger in Lille, France partnering Max Purcell.

== ATP Challenger and ITF Futures finals ==
=== Doubles: 19 (11–8) ===
Legend ATP Challenger (1–0) ITF Futures (10–8)	Finals by surface Hard (3–1) Clay (7–6) Grass (1–1) Carpet (0–0)

Result	W–L	Date	Tournament	Tier	Surface	Partner	Opponents	Score
Loss	0–1	Sep 2014	Belgium F14, Arlon	Futures	Clay	(Australia) Adam Taylor	(Germany) Pascal Meis (France) François-Arthur Vibert	2–6, 2–6
Loss	0–2	Jun 2016	Belgium F2, Havré	Futures	Clay	(Australia) Adam Taylor	(Belgium) Sander Gillé (Belgium) Joran Vliegen	2–6, 4–6
Win	1–2	Sep 2016	Belgium F12, Middelkerke	Futures	Clay	(Australia) Adam Taylor	(United Kingdom) Billy Harris (Germany) Jakob Sude	6–0, 6–2
Win	2–2	Jun 2017	Bosnia & Herzegovina F2, Brčko	Futures	Clay	(Australia) Adam Taylor	(Argentina) Franco Agamenone (Mexico) Lucas Gomez	7–6^{(7–3)}, 6–1
Win	3–2	Jul 2017	Belgium F6, Duinbergen	Futures	Clay	(Australia) Adam Taylor	(Belgium) Michael Geerts (Belgium) Jonas Merckx	4–6, 6–4, [10–8]
Win	4–2	Apr 2018	Australia F4, Mornington	Futures	Clay	(Australia) Adam Taylor	(Australia) Blake Ellis (Australia) Michael Look	7–6^{(7–4)}, 6–0
Loss	4–3	May 2018	Hungary F1, Zalaegerszeg	Futures	Clay	(Australia) Adam Taylor	(Estonia) Kenneth Raisma (Finland) Emil Ruusuvuori	4–6, 4–6
Loss	4–4	Sep 2018	Portugal F18, Oliveira de Azeméis	Futures	Hard	(Australia) Adam Taylor	(Portugal) Fred Gil (Guatemala) Wilfredo Gonzalez	7–5, 4–6, [5–10]
Loss	4–5	Mar 2019	M25 Albury, Australia	World Tennis Tour	Grass	(India) Arjun Kadhe	(United Kingdom) Brydan Klein (Australia) Scott Puodziunas	6–4, 5–7, [9–11]
Loss	4–6	Jul 2019	M25+H Pontedera, Italy	World Tennis Tour	Clay	(Australia) Adam Taylor	(Croatia) Matej Sabanov (Croatia) Ivan Sabanov	6–7^{(5–7)}, 2–6
Loss	4–7	Aug 2019	M25+H Bydgoszcz, Poland	World Tennis Tour	Clay	(Australia) Adam Taylor	(Ukraine) Vladyslav Manafov (Austria) David Pichler	3–6, 4–6
Win	5–7	Sep 2019	M25+H Oliveira de Azeméis, Portugal	World Tennis Tour	Hard	(Australia) Adam Taylor	(Switzerland) Riccardo Maiga (Spain) Pablo Vivero Gonzalez	7–6^{(7–0)}, 7–5
Win	6–7	Mar 2020	M25 Geelong, Australia	World Tennis Tour	Grass	(Australia) Adam Taylor	(United Kingdom) Brydan Klein (Australia) Scott Puodziunas	walkover
Win	7–7	Apr 2022	M25 Canberra, Australia	World Tennis Tour	Clay	(Australia) Adam Taylor	(Australia) Matthew Romios (Ukraine) Eric Vanshelboim	7–6^{(8–6)}, 4–6, [14–12]
Loss	7–8	May 2022	M25 Santa Margherita di Pula, Italy	World Tennis Tour	Clay	(Australia) Adam Taylor	(Zimbabwe) Benjamin Lock (Zimbabwe) Courtney John Lock	4–6, 6–3, [8–10]
Win	8–8	Aug 2022	M25 Padova, Italy	World Tennis Tour	Clay	(Australia) Brandon Walkin	(Croatia) Duje Ajduković (Croatia) Frane Nincevic	7–6^{(7–3)}, 6–0
Win	9–8	Aug 2022	M25 Poznań, Poland	World Tennis Tour	Clay	(Australia) Brandon Walkin	(Poland) Michal Dembek (Ukraine) Georgii Kravchenko	7–5, 7–5
Win	10–8	Mar 2023	M25 Portimão, Portugal	World Tennis Tour	Hard	(Portugal) Gonçalo Oliveira	(United Kingdom) Billy Harris (Australia) Akira Santillan	6–2, 6–2
Win	11–8	Mar 2023	Lille, France	Challenger	Hard (i)	(Australia) Max Purcell	(Jamaica) Dustin Brown (Pakistan) Aisam-ul-Haq Qureshi	7–6^{(7–3)}, 6–4
