= Alexander Blockx =

Belgian tennis player (born 2005)

- Blockx at the 2026 Cincinnati Open
- Country (sports): Belgium
- Residence: Antwerp, Belgium
- Born: 8 April 2005 (age 21) Antwerp, Belgium
- Height: 1.93 m (6 ft 4 in)
- Turned pro: 2022
- Plays: Right-handed (two-handed backhand)
- Coach: Ruben Bemelmans (May 2026–), Philippe Cassiers (2010–Apr 2026)
- Prize money: US $2,914,144

Singles
- Career record: 26–21 (at ATP Tour level, Grand Slam level, and in Davis Cup)
- Career titles: 0
- Highest ranking: No. 27 (14 September 2026)
- Current ranking: No. 28 (9 November 2026)

Grand Slam singles results
- Australian Open: 1R (2026)
- French Open: 2R (2026)
- Wimbledon: 1R (2026)
- US Open: QF (2026)

Doubles
- Career record: 1–5 (at ATP Tour level, Grand Slam level, and in Davis Cup)
- Highest ranking: No. 467 (10 November 2025)
- Current ranking: No. 889 (14 September 2026)

Grand Slam doubles results
- US Open: 1R (2026)

Team competitions
- Davis Cup: 0–1
- Last updated on: 14 September 2026.

Alexander Blockx (born 8 April 2005) is a Belgian professional tennis player. He has a career-high ATP singles ranking of world No. 27 achieved on 14 September 2026 and a best doubles ranking of No. 467, reached on 10 November 2025. He is the current No. 1 Belgian player in men's singles.

Blockx won the boys' singles title at the 2023 Australian Open. He represents Belgium at the Davis Cup.

== Early life ==
Blockx was born in Antwerp, to a family of Ukrainian descent that immigrated to Belgium from USSR. Blockx's parents were both professional athletes: His father, Oleg, was a track athlete in hurdle races and his mother, Natalia, was a swimmer. He was introduced to tennis in his childhood by accompanying and observing his older brother Maxime taking his tennis lessons.

His first coach, Philippe Cassiers, asked if the younger Blockx would also like to try playing tennis, and gave him a racquet. They started their partnership when Blockx was 4.

== Career ==
=== Juniors ===
Blockx reached the third round and then quarterfinals of major junior events of that season, at 2022 Wimbledon and at the 2022 US Open. The following year, Blockx reached the final at the 2023 Australian Open in both the boys' singles and doubles categories. Partnering with Brazilian João Fonseca, he was the runner-up in doubles, defeated by Learner Tien and Cooper Williams. Blockx gained revenge over Tien by winning the boys' singles final in three sets. Although Gilles-Arnaud Bailly reached two major junior finals in 2022, the last Belgian boy to lift a title at this level, prior to Blockx, was Kimmer Coppejans at the 2012 French Open. Blockx had good results in Juniors, maintaining a 108–48 singles win-loss record, and reached an ITF junior combined ranking of world No. 1 on 1 May 2023.

=== 2022: Beginnings, ATP doubles debut ===
Blockx made his ATP Tour qualifying debut at his national tournament, the 2022 European Open in his hometown, Antwerp, where he was given a wildcard. He lost to Swiss Dominic Stricker in straight sets.

He was also given a wildcard into the main draw of the doubles, playing alongside Ruben Bemelmans in what proved to be Bemelmans' last professional match.

=== 2023: ATP singles and top 500 debuts ===
In March, Blockx made his Masters 1000 qualifications debut after receiving a wildcard for the 2023 Miami Open, where he lost to Yosuke Watanuki.

Blockx received a wildcard for the qualifying competition at the Antwerp Open and qualified into the main draw on his ATP singles debut. In his very first ATP Tour singles main draw match ever in his hometown, he lost to fifth seed Yannick Hanfmann in two close sets. Just a week after his first appearance on the ATP circuit, he won his first ITF title in Glasgow. One week later he won his second title in Sunderland. Partly due to his first qualification for an ATP tournament and winning two ITF titles, he entered the top 500 for the first time on 6 November 2023.

=== 2024: Maiden Challenger title, top 250 ===
Blockx received a wildcard for the qualifying competition at the 2024 Australian Open. He also received a qualifying wildcard for the 2024 Miami Open but lost to Pedro Martinez in the first round. He reached a new career-high ranking of No. 294 on 18 March 2024. In November, Blockx won his maiden Challenger title in Kobe, Japan, defeating Jurij Rodionov in the final. He became the third-youngest Belgian champion in Challenger history (after Libor Pimek and Olivier Rochus). En route to the title, he defeated for the first time a top-100 player, Taro Daniel. As a result, he rose to No. 205 on 18 November 2024, which gave him direct entry to the Grand Slam qualifying rounds.

=== 2025: First ATP win, NextGen finalist, top 125 ===
In January, Blockx won his second Challenger title in Oeiras, Portugal, defeating Liam Draxl in the final. He became the youngest Belgian to earn multiple trophies at that level. As a result, he entered the top 150 in the singles rankings on 27 January 2025. Blockx made his Masters main draw debut at the 2025 Miami Open as a qualifier but lost to Corentin Moutet.

In July, Blockx reached his third Challenger final at the Winnipeg Challenger, losing to Liam Draxl in the final. Blockx entered his second Masters 1000 main draw as a qualifier at the National Bank Open in Toronto. Ranked at a career high of world No. 119, achieved on 4 August 2025, Blockx also qualified for the main draw at the Cincinnati Open, where he recorded his first ATP Tour win, as well as his first Masters 1000 win, by defeating Marcos Giron. The result solidified Blockx's fifth position in the NextGen Live Race to Jeddah. Blockx won his second Challenger of the 2025 season at the 2025 Slovak Open, and moved to fourth in the NextGen race. At the 2025 Moselle Open, Blockx received an entry through the Next Gen Accelerator programme and recorded his second tour-level win, defeating qualifier Francesco Passaro. As a result, he moved up to world No. 101 in the singles rankings on 10 November 2025.

Blockx reached the 2025 Next Gen ATP Finals championship match, but lost to previous year finalist Learner Tien.

=== 2026: Major debut, Masters semifinal, ATP final, top 30 ===
In January, Blockx won his fourth Challenger singles trophy at the Canberra International, defeating qualifier Rafael Jódar in the final. As a result of that title, he entered the top 100 on 12 January 2026. Later in the month, Blockx made his major debut at the Australian Open as a lucky loser, following the withdrawal of Arthur Cazaux. He lost in the first round to Jaime Faria in four sets.

In February, Blockx reached his second Challenger final of the season in Lille, losing to seventh seed and home favourite Luca Van Assche in the final.

In April, Blockx won his first ATP Tour matches on clay with a run to the third round as a qualifier, at the 2026 Monte-Carlo Masters. His defeat over Flavio Cobolli in the second round was his first top-20 win. At the next Masters, the 2026 Mutua Madrid Open, he defeated third seed Félix Auger-Aliassime in the third round, recording his first Top-10 win. Next the Belgian defeated 16th seed Francisco Cerúndolo, as well as defending champion Casper Ruud in straight sets to reach his first Masters 1000 semifinal. Blockx became only the second man born in 2005 or later, after Jakub Menšík, to reach the semifinals at a Masters event. He lost to second seed Alexander Zverev. As a result, he entered the Top 40 at world No. 36 and became the No. 1 Belgian player in the ATP singles rankings on 4 May 2026.

Blockx reached the second round on his debut in the main draw at the 2026 French Open with a straight sets win against Coleman Wong, but was forced to withdraw with an ankle injury prior to his second round match against 8th seed Alex de Minaur.

In July, Blockx reached his first ATP Tour final at the Estoril Open. but lost to Luca Van Assche. As a result, despite the loss, he entered the top 35 at a new career-high singles ranking of world No. 32 on 27 July 2026. In September at the 2026 US Open as the 28th seed, Blockx became the first Belgian man in history to reach the US Open quarter-finals after defeating fifth seed Flavio Cobolli and Argentine Francisco Cerundolo. The result also meant he became the fourth Belgian to reach that point at any slam, and the youngest Belgian major quarter-finalist since the Open Era began in 1968.

== Coaching ==
Since 2022, Blockx partly trains at the Tennis Vlaanderen in Antwerp and Cassiers' Forest Hills Tennis Academy. He was coached by Philippe Cassiers from 2010 until 2026.

== Career statistics ==
=== Performance timeline ===
Key
W	F	SF	QF	#R	RR	Q#	DNQ	A	NH

(W) winner; (F) finalist; (SF) semifinalist; (QF) quarterfinalist; (#R) rounds 4, 3, 2, 1; (RR) round-robin stage; (Q#) qualification round; (DNQ) did not qualify; (A) absent; (NH) not held; (SR) strike rate (events won / competed); (W–L) win–loss record.
To avoid confusion and double counting, these charts are updated at the conclusion of a tournament or when the player's participation has ended.

==== Singles ====
Current through the 2026 US Open.

Tournament	2023	2024	2025	2026	SR	W–L	Win %
Grand Slam tournaments
Australian Open	A	Q1	Q1	1R	0 / 1	0–1	0%
French Open	A	A	Q1	2R (Note: Withdraw during the tournament. Not counted as a loss.)	0 / 1	1–0	100%
Wimbledon	A	A	Q3	1R	0 / 1	0–1	0%
US Open	A	A	Q2	QF	0 / 1	4–1	80%
Win–loss	0–0	0–0	0–0	5–4	0 / 4	5–4	56%
Masters tournaments
Indian Wells	A	A	A	Q1	0 / 0	0–0	–
Miami Open	Q1	Q1	1R	Q2	0 / 1	0–1	0%
Monte-Carlo Masters	A	A	A	3R	0 / 1	2–1	67%
Madrid Open	A	A	A	SF	0 / 1	5–1	83%
Italian Open	A	A	A	3R	0 / 1	2–1	67%
Canadian Open	A	A	1R	3R (Note: Blockx received a walkover in the second round of the 2026 Canadian Open against Jaume Munar, which does not officially count as a win.)	0 / 2	0–2	0%
Cincinnati Masters	A	A	2R	3R	0 / 2	2–2	50%
Shanghai Masters	A	A	A		0 / 0	0–0	–
Paris Masters	A	A	A		0 / 0	0–0	–
Win–loss	0–0	0–0	1–3	10–5	0 / 8	11–8	58%

=== ATP Tour finals ===
==== Singles: 1 (runner-up) ====
Legend Grand Slam (–) ATP 1000 (–) ATP 500 (–) ATP 250 (0–1)	Finals by surface Hard (–) Clay (0–1) Grass (–)	Finals by setting Outdoor (0–1) Indoor (–)

Result	W–L	Date	Tournament	Tier	Surface	Opponent	Score
Loss	0–1	Jul 2026	Estoril Open, Portugal	ATP 250	Clay	(France) Luca Van Assche	4–6, 6–4, 5–7

=== Next Gen ATP finals ===
==== Singles: 1 (runner-up) ====
Result	Date	Tournament	Surface	Opponent	Score
Loss	Dec 2025	Next Gen ATP Finals, Saudi Arabia	Hard (i)	(United States) Learner Tien	3–4^{(4–7)}, 2–4, 1–4

=== ATP Challenger Tour finals ===
==== Singles: 6 (4 titles, 2 runner-ups) ====
Finals by surface
Hard (4–2)
Clay (–)

Result	W–L	Date	Tournament	Surface	Opponent	Score
Win	1–0	Nov 2024	Hyōgo Noah Challenger, Japan	Hard (i)	(Austria) Jurij Rodionov	6–3, 6–1
Win	2–0	Jan 2025	Oeiras Indoors III, Portugal	Hard (i)	(Canada) Liam Draxl	7–5, 6–1
Loss	2–1	Jul 2025	Winnipeg National Bank Challenger, Canada	Hard	(Canada) Liam Draxl	6–1, 3–6, 4–6
Win	3–1	Oct 2025	Slovak Open, Slovakia	Hard (i)	(France) Titouan Droguet	6–4, 6–3
Win	4–1	Jan 2026	Workday Canberra International, Australia	Hard	(Spain) Rafael Jódar	6–4, 6–4
Loss	4–2	Feb 2026	Play In Challenger, France	Hard (i)	(France) Luca Van Assche	2–6, 4–6

==== Doubles: 1 (runner-up) ====
Result	W–L	Date	Tournament	Surface	Partner	Opponents	Score
Loss	0–1	Feb 2025	Open Pau–Pyrénées, France	Hard (i)	(Belgium) Raphaël Collignon	(Germany) Jakob Schnaitter (Germany) Mark Wallner	4–6, 7–6^{(7–5)}, [8–10]

=== ITF Tour finals ===
==== Singles: 4 (2 titles, 2 runner-ups) ====
Finals by surface
Hard (2–2)
Clay (–)

Result	W–L	Date	Tournament	Surface	Opponent	Score
Loss	0–1	Mar 2023	M15 Sharm El Sheikh, Egypt	Hard	(Georgia (country)) Saba Purtseladze	3–6, 4–6
Loss	0–2	Sep 2023	M25 Falun, Sweden	Hard (i)	(Belgium) Tibo Colson	5–7, 6–4, 3–6
Win	1–2	Oct 2023	M25 Glasgow, UK	Hard (i)	(United Kingdom) Anton Matusevich	5–7, 6–4, 6–2
Win	2–2	Nov 2023	M25 Sunderland, UK	Hard (i)	(Belgium) Tibo Colson	4–6, 6–2, 6–4

==== Doubles: 1 (runner-up) ====
Result	W–L	Date	Tournament	Surface	Partner	Opponents	Score
Loss	0–1	Jun 2023	M25 Arlon, Belgium	Clay	(Belgium) Alessio Basile	(Brazil) Gabriel Roveri Sidney (Ukraine) Vladyslav Orlov	6–0, 5–7, [5–10]

=== Junior Grand Slam finals ===
==== Singles: 1 (title) ====
Result	Year	Tournament	Surface	Opponent	Score
Win	2023	Australian Open	Hard	(United States) Learner Tien	6–1, 2–6, 7–6^{(11–9)}

==== Doubles: 1 (runner-up) ====
Result	Year	Tournament	Surface	Partner	Opponents	Score
Loss	2023	Australian Open	Hard	(Brazil) João Fonseca	(United States) Learner Tien (United States) Cooper Williams	4–6, 4–6

=== Wins over top-10 players ===
- Blockx has a 2–6 (25%) match record against players who were, at the time the match was played, ranked in the top 10.

Season	2026	Total
Wins	2	2

#	Player	Rk	Event	Surface	Rd	Score	Rk	Ref
2026
1.	(Canada) Félix Auger-Aliassime	5	Madrid Open, Spain	Clay	3R	7–6^{(7–3)}, 6–3	69	
2.	(Italy) Flavio Cobolli	6	US Open, United States	Hard	3R	6–7^{(4–7)}, 6–3, 6–0, 6–3	34	

- Key: (Rk) first use, opponent rank; (Rd) round; (Rk) 2nd use, player rank; (Ref) reference; (F) final; (SF) semifinal; (QF) quarterfinal; (#R) rounds 4, 3, 2, 1; (RR) round-robin stage; (Q#) qualifying rounds or stages (3), 2, 1.

*As of 5 September 2026
