= Yannick Maden =

German tennis player

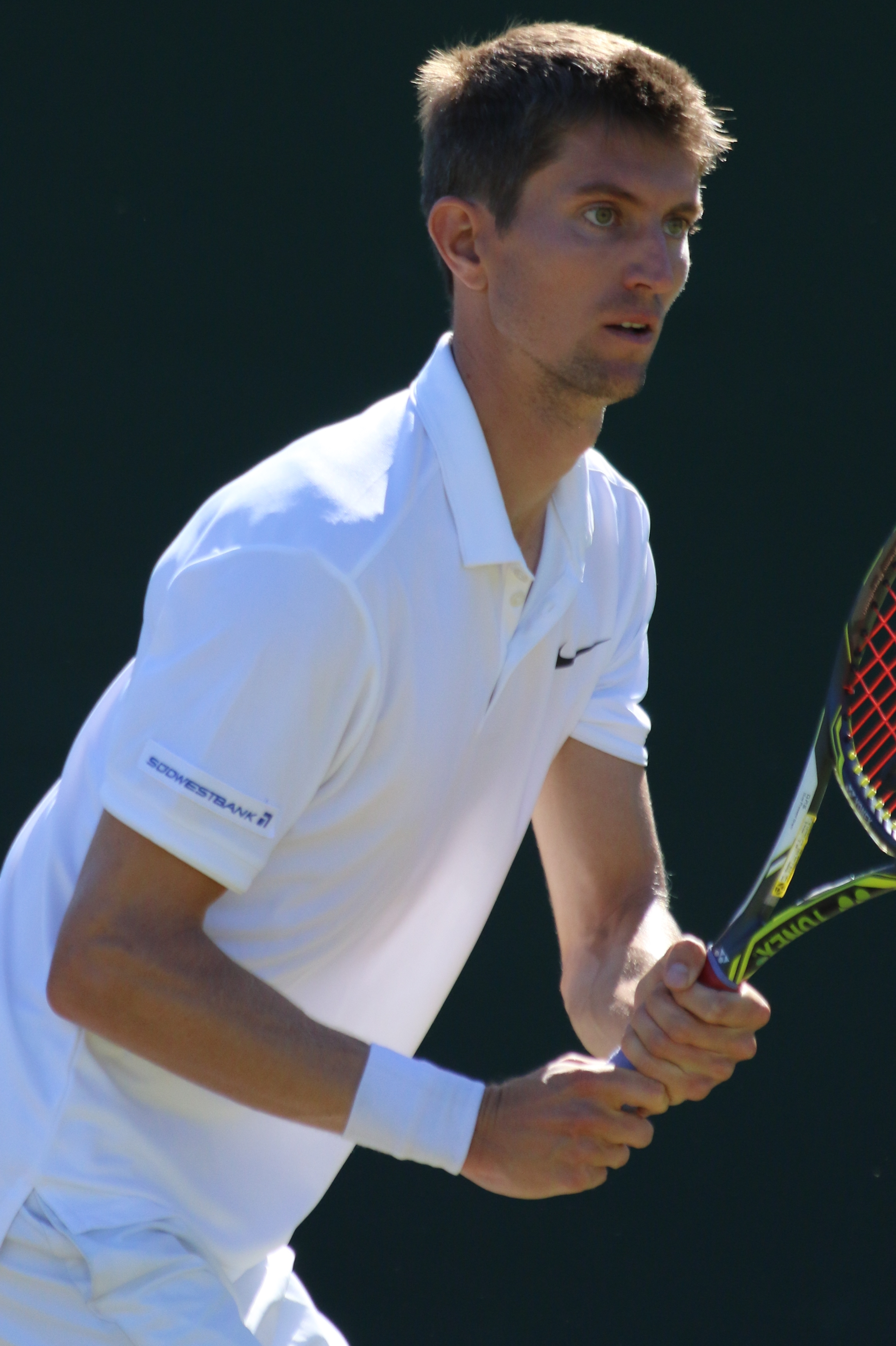
- Maden at the 2018 Wimbledon Championships
- Country (sports): Germany
- Residence: Stuttgart, Germany
- Born: 28 October 1989 (age 35) Stuttgart, Germany
- Height: 1.85 m (6 ft 1 in)
- Turned pro: 2013
- Retired: 2022
- Plays: Right-handed (two–handed backhand)
- College: Clemson
- Prize money: $760,330

Singles
- Career record: 9–17
- Career titles: 0
- Highest ranking: No. 96 (24 June 2019)

Grand Slam singles results
- Australian Open: Q2 (2020, 2021)
- French Open: 2R (2019)
- Wimbledon: 1R (2018)
- US Open: 1R (2018)

Doubles
- Career record: 1–3
- Career titles: 0
- Highest ranking: No. 375 (15 April 2019)

Yannick Maden (born 28 October 1989) is a retired German tennis player. He graduated from Clemson University, where he played on the tennis team before entering the professional tour.

== Professional career ==
Maden made his ATP main draw debut as a qualifier at the 2016 European Open, where he lost to fifth seed Gilles Simon in the first round. He won his first match at ATP-level at the 2017 Moselle Open, defeating Nicolás Kicker in the first round.

== Performance timelines ==
Key
W	F	SF	QF	#R	RR	Q#	P#	DNQ	A	Z#	PO	G	S	B	NMS	NTI	P	NH

(W) winner; (F) finalist; (SF) semifinalist; (QF) quarterfinalist; (#R) rounds 4, 3, 2, 1; (RR) round-robin stage; (Q#) qualification round; (P#) preliminary round; (DNQ) did not qualify; (A) absent; (Z#) Davis/Fed Cup Zonal Group (with number indication) or (PO) play-off; (G) gold, (S) silver or (B) bronze Olympic/Paralympic medal; (NMS) not a Masters tournament; (NTI) not a Tier I tournament; (P) postponed; (NH) not held; (SR) strike rate (events won / competed); (W–L) win–loss record.
To avoid confusion and double counting, these charts are updated at the conclusion of a tournament or when the player's participation has ended.

=== Singles ===
Tournament	2013	2014	2015	2016	2017	2018	2019	2020	2021	2022	SR	W–L
Grand Slam tournaments
Australian Open	A	A	A	A	A	A	Q1	Q2	Q2	A	0 / 0	0–0
French Open	A	A	A	A	A	Q1	2R	Q2	Q2	A	0 / 1	1–1
Wimbledon	A	A	A	A	Q1	1R	Q1	NH	Q1	A	0 / 1	0–1
US Open	A	A	A	A	Q1	1R	Q1	A	Q1	A	0 / 1	0–1
Win–loss	0–0	0–0	0–0	0–0	0–0	0–2	1–1	0–0	0–0	0–0	0 / 3	1–3
Career statistics
Tournaments	0	0	0	1	1	8	6	1	0	0	17	
Overall win–loss	0–0	0–0	0–0	0–1	1–1	5–8	3–6	0–1	0–0	0–0	9–17	
Year-end ranking	704	447	654	272	147	126	126	173	299	1487	35%	

== ATP Challenger and ITF Futures finals ==
=== Singles: 24 (8–16) ===
Legend ATP Challenger (0–7) ITF Futures (8–9)	Finals by surface Hard (1–7) Clay (7–9) Grass (0–0) Carpet (0–0)

Result	W–L	Date	Tournament	Tier	Surface	Opponent	Score
Loss	0–1	Aug 2013	Germany F13, Friedberg	Futures	Clay	(Germany) Steven Moneke	6–2, 1–6, 4–6
Win	1–1	Sep 2013	Germany F16, Kenn	Futures	Clay	(France) Constant Lestienne	6–4, 4–6, 6–3
Win	2–1	Feb 2014	USA F6, Boynton Beach	Futures	Clay	(United States) Eric Quigley	7–6^{(7–5)}, 6–1
Loss	2–2	Jun 2014	Serbia F2, Belgrade	Futures	Clay	(Serbia) Miljan Zekić	5–7, 3–6
Loss	2–3	Sep 2014	Italy F32, Pula	Futures	Clay	(Italy) Walter Trusendi	1–6, 6–3, 1–6
Loss	2–4	Sep 2015	Italy F27, Pula	Futures	Clay	(Italy) Gianluca Mager	6–7^{(6–8)}, 6–2, 3–6
Win	3–4	Feb 2016	Great Britain F3, Shrewsbury	Futures	Hard (i)	(United Kingdom) Edward Corrie	3–6, 7–5, 7–6^{(7–1)}
Loss	3–5	Mar 2016	Croatia F2, Poreč	Futures	Clay	(Czech Republic) Zdeněk Kolář	6–4, 4–6, 2–6
Loss	3–6	Apr 2016	Bahrain F1, Manama	Futures	Hard	(Netherlands) Scott Griekspoor	6–3, 3–6, 3–6
Win	4–6	Apr 2016	Italy F8, Pula	Futures	Clay	(Italy) Francisco Bahamonde	3–6, 6–3, 6–0
Loss	4–7	Jun 2016	Germany F4, Kaltenkirchen	Futures	Clay	(France) Grégoire Jacq	6–3, 2–3 ret.
Win	5–7	Sep 2016	Belgium F13, Arlon	Futures	Clay	(Germany) Marvin Netuschil	6–4, 6–2
Win	6–7	Oct 2016	Italy F32, Pula	Futures	Clay	(Italy) Stefano Travaglia	2–6, 6–4, 6–3
Loss	6–8	Oct 2016	Great Britain F4, Loughborough	Futures	Hard (i)	(Belgium) Maxime Authom	1–3 ret.
Loss	6–9	Apr 2017	Spain F9, Madrid	Futures	Clay	(Italy) Stefano Travaglia	1–6, 2–6
Win	7–9	Apr 2017	Italy F8, Pula	Futures	Clay	(Argentina) Andrea Collarini	2–6, 6–1, 6–3
Win	8–9	Jun 2017	Italy F15, Reggio Emilia	Futures	Clay	(France) Gianni Mina	6–4, 4–6, 6–1
Loss	0–1	Jul 2017	Prague, Czech Republic	Challenger	Clay	(Slovakia) Andrej Martin	6–7^{(3–7)}, 3–6
Loss	0–2	Nov 2017	Mouilleron-le-Captif, France	Challenger	Hard (i)	(Sweden) Elias Ymer	5–7, 4–6
Loss	0–3	Jul 2018	Scheveningen, Netherlands	Challenger	Clay	(Netherlands) Thiemo de Bakker	2–6, 1–6
Loss	0–4	Nov 2018	Mouilleron-le-Captif, France	Challenger	Hard (i)	(Sweden) Elias Ymer	3–6, 6–7^{(5–7)}
Loss	0–5	Mar 2019	Drummondville, Canada	Challenger	Hard (i)	(Lithuania) Ričardas Berankis	3–6, 5–7
Loss	0–6	Mar 2019	Lille, France	Challenger	Hard	(France) Grégoire Barrère	2–6, 6–4, 4–6
Loss	0–7	Oct 2019	Nur-Sultan, Kazakhstan	Challenger	Hard (i)	(Ukraine) Illya Marchenko	6–4, 4–6, 3–6

=== Doubles: 7 (3–4) ===
Legend ATP Challenger (0–2) ITF Futures (3–2)	Finals by surface Hard (0–2) Clay (3–1) Grass (0–0) Carpet (0–1)

Result	W–L	Date	Tournament	Tier	Surface	Partner	Opponents	Score
Loss	0–1	Jan 2013	Germany F1, Schwieberdingen	Futures	Carpet (i)	(Germany) Dominique Maden	(Republic of Ireland) James Cluskey (Germany) Alexander Satschko	0–6, 1–6
Win	1–1	Aug 2013	Germany F13, Friedberg	Futures	Clay	(Germany) Moritz Dettinger	(Germany) Daniel Baumann (Germany) Michael Feucht	7–6^{(9–7)}, 7–5
Win	2–1	Jun 2014	Serbia F1, Belgrade	Futures	Clay	(Germany) Dominique Maden	(Serbia) Nikola Ćirić (Serbia) Miljan Zekić	6–4, 2–6, [10–3]
Win	3–1	Aug 2014	Germany F12, Karlsruhe	Futures	Clay	(Germany) Dominique Maden	(Germany) Adrian Obert (Germany) Paul Wörner	6–3, 6–1
Loss	3–2	Mar 2015	Morocco F1, Casablanca	Futures	Clay	(France) Samuel Bensoussan	(Monaco) Romain Arneodo (France) Florent Diep	3–6, 7–6^{(7–2)}, [8–10]
Loss	0–1	Sep 2018	Orléans, France	Challenger	Hard (i)	(Austria) Tristan-Samuel Weissborn	(United Kingdom) Luke Bambridge (United Kingdom) Jonny O'Mara	2–6, 4–6
Loss	0–2	Feb 2020	Koblenz, Germany	Challenger	Hard (i)	(Germany) Julian Lenz	(Netherlands) Sander Arends (Netherlands) David Pel	6–7^{(4–7)}, 6–7^{(3–7)}
