= Arthur Bouquier =

French tennis player (born 2000)

- Country (sports): France
- Born: 25 December 2000 (age 25) Lons-le-Saunier, France
- Height: 1.88 m (6 ft 2 in)
- Plays: Right-handed (two-handed backhand)
- Coach: Pierre-Yves Vuignier, Thierry Kvartskhava, Sébastien Boltz
- Prize money: US $235,015

Singles
- Career record: 0–0
- Career titles: 0; 1 Challenger
- Highest ranking: No. 189 (31 March 2025)
- Current ranking: No. 232 (24 November 2025)

Grand Slam singles results
- Australian Open: Q1 (2026)
- French Open: Q1 (2025)
- Wimbledon: Q2 (2025)
- US Open: Q1 (2025)

Doubles
- Career record: 0–0
- Career titles: 0
- Highest ranking: No. 249 (13 February 2023)
- Current ranking: No. 776 (24 November 2025)
- Last updated on: 24 November 2025.

Arthur Bouquier (born 25 December 2000) is a French professional tennis player. He has a career-high ATP singles ranking of No. 189, achieved on 31 March 2025 and a doubles ranking of No. 249, achieved on 13 February 2023.

== Professional career ==
=== 2024: Maiden ITF title ===
Bouquier won his maiden ITF title in Veigy-Foncenex, France, defeating Antoine Hoang in the final. Later that year, he won his second title in Azay-le-Rideau, defeating Alexandre Reco in the final.

=== 2025: Maiden Challenger title, Top 200 ===
In February, Bouquier won his maiden Challenger title in Lille, France following the retirement in the final of third seed Lucas Pouille, due to injury. In March, Bouquier reached his second Challenger final in Thionville, France, losing to top seed Borna Ćorić in the final. He broke the top 200 as a result.

In May, Bouquier made his Grand Slam qualifying debut at the French Open, where he lost in the first round to Federico Coria. In June, he reached the second round of qualifying at Wimbledon.

== Performance timeline ==
Key
W	F	SF	QF	#R	RR	Q#	DNQ	A	NH

(W) winner; (F) finalist; (SF) semifinalist; (QF) quarterfinalist; (#R) rounds 4, 3, 2, 1; (RR) round-robin stage; (Q#) qualification round; (DNQ) did not qualify; (A) absent; (NH) not held; (SR) strike rate (events won / competed); (W–L) win–loss record.
To avoid confusion and double counting, these charts are updated at the conclusion of a tournament or when the player's participation has ended.

=== Singles ===
Tournament	2025	2026	SR	W–L	Win%
Grand Slam tournaments
Australian Open	A	Q1	0 / 0	0–0	–
French Open	Q1		0 / 0	0–0	–
Wimbledon	Q2		0 / 0	0–0	–
US Open	Q1		0 / 0	0–0	–
Win–loss	0–0	0–0	0 / 0	0–0	–

== ATP Challenger Tour finals ==
=== Singles: 2 (1 title, 1 runner-up) ===
Legend ATP Challenger Tour (1–1)

Result	W–L	Date	Tournament	Tier	Surface	Opponent	Score
Win	1–0	Feb 2025	Lille, France	Challenger	Hard (i)	(France) Lucas Pouille	6–3, 3–5, ret.
Loss	1–1	Mar 2025	Thionville, France	Challenger	Hard (i)	(Croatia) Borna Ćorić	4–6, 4–6

=== Doubles: 1 (1 runner-up) ===
Legend ATP Challenger Tour (0–1)	Finals by surface Hard (0–1)

Result	W–L	Date	Tournament	Tier	Surface	Partner	Opponent	Score
Loss	0–1	Jan 2026	Quimper, France	Challenger	Hard (i)	(France) Dan Added	(France) Arthur Reymond (France) Luca Sanchez	6-7^{(7–9)}, 6-3, [3–10]

== ITF World Tennis Tour finals ==
=== Singles: 7 (2 titles, 5 runner-ups) ===
Legend ITF WTT (2–5)	Finals by surface Hard (1–5) Carpet (1–0)

Result	W–L	Date	Tournament	Tier	Surface	Opponent	Score
Loss	0–1	Jan 2024	M15 Bressuire, France	WTT	Hard (i)	(France) Maé Malige	6–7^{(3–7)}, 4–6
Win	1–1	Jan 2024	M15 Veigy-Foncenex, France	WTT	Carpet (i)	(France) Antoine Hoang	6–7^{(5–7)}, 6–4, 6–4
Loss	1–2	Apr 2024	M15 Lons-le-Saunier, France	WTT	Hard (i)	(France) Axel Garcian	6–7^{(4–7)}, 5–7
Win	2–2	Apr 2024	M15 Azay-le-Rideau, France	WTT	Hard (i)	(France) Alexandre Reco	6–1, 6–1
Loss	2–3	May 2024	M15 Monastir, Tunisia	WTT	Hard	(France) Maxence Rivet	4–6, 1–6
Loss	2–4	May 2024	M15 Monastir, Tunisia	WTT	Hard	(Portugal) Tiago Pereira	6–7^{(1–7)}, 2–6
Loss	2–5	Jun 2024	M25 Martos, Spain	WTT	Hard	(Belgium) Michael Geerts	4–6, ret.

=== Doubles: 19 (13 titles, 6 runner-ups) ===
Legend ITF WTT (13–6)	Finals by surface Hard (12–2) Clay (0–1) Grass (0–1) Carpet (1–2)

Result	W–L	Date	Tournament	Tier	Surface	Partner	Opponents	Score
Loss	0–1	Nov 2019	M15 Villers-lès-Nancy, France	WTT	Hard (i)	(France) Sébastien Boltz	(Switzerland) Yannik Steinegger (Switzerland) Jakub Paul	6–4, 4–6, [11–13]
Loss	0–2	Oct 2020	M15 Forbach, France	WTT	Carpet (i)	(France) Louis Dussin	(Switzerland) Jakub Paul (Switzerland) Luca Castelnuovo	6–7^{(4–7)}, 1–6
Loss	0–3	Jun 2021	M25 Montauban, France	WTT	Clay	(France) Louis Dussin	(Italy) Franco Agamenone (France) Antoine Escoffier	1–6, 5–7
Win	1–3	Jul 2021	M25+H Ajaccio, France	WTT	Hard	(Brazil) Mateus Alves	(France) Lisandru Rodriguez (Italy) Alessio Tramontin	6–4, 7–6^{(9–7)}
Win	2–3	Feb 2022	M15 Grenoble, France	WTT	Hard (i)	(France) Martin Breysach	(Switzerland) Louroi Martinez (Switzerland) Leandro Riedi	6–2, 6–3
Win	3–3	Apr 2022	M15 Monastir, Tunisia	WTT	Hard	(France) Martin Breysach	Kirill Kivattsev (Argentina) Federico Agustín Gómez	6–2, 6–3
Win	4–3	Apr 2022	M15 Monastir, Tunisia	WTT	Hard	(France) Martin Breysach	(Italy) Giovanni Oradini (Spain) Adrià Soriano Barrera	6–3, 6–4
Loss	4–4	Oct 2022	M25 Sarreguemines, France	WTT	Carpet (i)	(France) Grégoire Jacq	(United Kingdom) Scott Duncan (United Kingdom) Marcus Willis	6–4, 3–6, [8–10]
Loss	4–5	Oct 2022	M15 Villers-lès-Nancy, France	WTT	Hard (i)	(France) Grégoire Jacq	(United Kingdom) Scott Duncan (United Kingdom) Marcus Willis	1–6, 0–2 ret.
Win	5–5	Nov 2022	M25 Monastir, Tunisia	WTT	Hard	(Italy) Luca Potenza	(Chinese Taipei) Ray Ho (China) Bu Yunchaokete	6–2, 6–2
Win	6–5	Nov 2022	M25 Monastir, Tunisia	WTT	Hard	(Austria) Neil Oberleitner	(Chinese Taipei) Ray Ho (China) Bu Yunchaokete	6–1, 6–4
Win	7–5	Dec 2022	M15 Monastir, Tunisia	WTT	Hard	(France) Raphaël Lambling	(Germany) Adrian Oetzbach (Germany) Christoph Negritu	7–5, 5–7, [10–4]
Win	8–5	Apr 2023	M15 Monastir, Tunisia	WTT	Hard	(France) Maxence Beaugé	(Ghana) Abraham Asaba (Ivory Coast) Eliakim Coulibaly	6–2, 7–6^{(7–5)}
Loss	8–6	Jul 2023	M25 Roehampton, United Kingdom	WTT	Grass	(France) François Musitelli	(United Kingdom) Emile Hudd (United Kingdom) Johannus Monday	4–6, 5–7
Win	9–6	Oct 2023	M25+H Rodez, France	WTT	Hard (i)	(Switzerland) Jakub Paul	(United Kingdom) Ben Jones (United Kingdom) Joshua Paris	7–6^{(7–5)}, 6–3
Win	10–6	Mar 2024	M25 Toulouse–Balma, France	WTT	Hard (i)	(Switzerland) Rémy Bertola	(Czech Republic) David Poljak (Czech Republic) Matěj Vocel	7–6^{(8–6)}, 5–7, [10–6]
Win	11–6	Jun 2024	M25 Martos, Spain	WTT	Hard	(France) Robin Bertrand	(Spain) Iván Marrero Curbelo (Ecuador) Patricio Alvarado	6–3, 7–5
Win	12–6	Oct 2024	M25 Sarreguemines, France	WTT	Carpet (i)	(France) Axel Garcian	(France) Arthur Nagel (France) Dan Added	6–2, 6–3
Win	13–6	Jan 2025	M25 Hazebrouck, France	WTT	Hard (i)	(France) Dan Added	(Bulgaria) Anthony Genov (Poland) Szymon Kielan	6–1, 6–0
