= Grégoire Barrère =

French tennis player (born 1994)

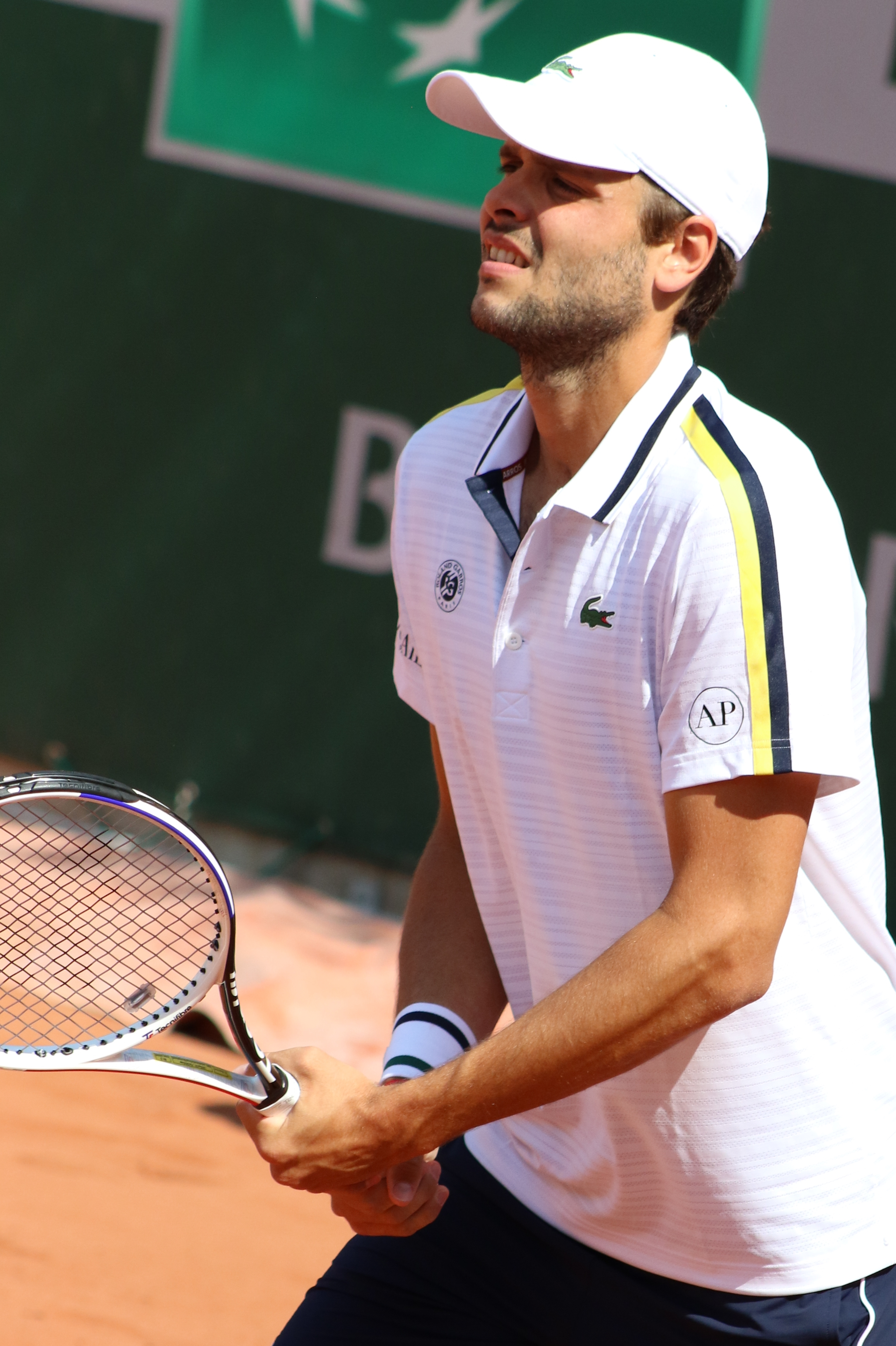
- Barrère at the 2021 French Open
- Country (sports): France
- Residence: Saint-Maur-des-Fossés, France
- Born: 16 February 1994 (age 31) Saint-Maur-des-Fossés, France
- Height: 1.83 m (6 ft 0 in)
- Turned pro: 2012
- Retired: 2025
- Plays: Right-handed (two-handed backhand)
- Coach: Germain Gigounon
- Prize money: US $3,090,067

Singles
- Career record: 38–64
- Career titles: 0
- Highest ranking: No. 49 (3 July 2023)

Grand Slam singles results
- Australian Open: 2R (2020)
- French Open: 2R (2019, 2022)
- Wimbledon: 2R (2019, 2023)
- US Open: 2R (2019, 2020)

Doubles
- Career record: 11–20
- Career titles: 0
- Highest ranking: No. 161 (26 April 2021)

Grand Slam doubles results
- Australian Open: 2R (2020)
- French Open: 3R (2019, 2024)
- Wimbledon: 1R (2023)
- US Open: 2R (2023)

Grand Slam mixed doubles results
- French Open: 1R (2024)

Grégoire Barrère (French pronunciation: [ɡʁeɡwaʁ baʁɛʁ]; born 16 February 1994) is a French former professional tennis player. He has a career high ATP singles ranking of No. 49, which was achieved on 3 July 2023. He also has a career-high ATP doubles ranking of No. 161 achieved on 26 April 2021. Barrère has won six ATP Challenger Tour and six ITF Futures singles titles as well as five Challenger and six ITF doubles titles in his career.

== Professional career ==
=== 2016-18: Grand Slam debut ===
Barrère made his Grand Slam main-draw debut at the 2016 French Open, where he received a wildcard, but lost to David Goffin in the first round.

He was awarded a wildcard to the 2018 French Open, where he lost to Radu Albot in the first round after leading 2 sets to 0.

=== 2019: Grand Slam success, Top 100 debut ===
In 2019, he succeeded to qualify and reach the second round of two Grand Slams 2019 Wimbledon Championships and the US Open, defeating Alexander Bublik and Cameron Norrie respectively, and also reach the second round of the 2019 French Open as a wildcard where he lost in four sets to 10th seed Karen Khachanov after winning the third set 6–0. He also achieved in the same year the main draws of a few ATP 250 tournaments.

=== 2020-21: Australian Open second round ===
At the 2020 Australian Open he also reached the second round as a direct entry, thus reaching this round of all four Grand Slams. He also entered directly into the 2020 French Open main draw.

He reached the final of the 2021 Play In Challenger in Lille for a third time in his career at this tournament but lost to Zizou Bergs. He was awarded a wildcard into the 2021 French Open.

=== 2022: Fifth French Open wildcard, Two Challenger titles, back to top 100 ===
In May, he was awarded his fifth wildcard into the main draw of the 2022 French Open. He won his second match at this Major defeating Taro Daniel in five sets.

He won his fourth Challenger title in 2022 Open d'Orléans defeating fourth seed Quentin Halys. He became the first Challenger champion for 2022 to defeat four Top-100 players en route to the title (fifth since 2010): fifth seed Marton Fucsovics, third seed Richard Gasquet, second seed Hugo Gaston. As a result he moved close to 40 positions up to world No. 116 on 3 October 2022. Following his second Challenger title for the season in Brest, he moved close to 20 positions up in the rankings to No. 92 on 31 October 2022.

=== 2023: Masters debuts & two third rounds, ATP semifinal, top 50 ===
He reached the top 75 on 6 February 2023 following the Open Quimper, where he won his sixth Challenger title.

At the Rotterdam Open he qualified for the main draw and defeated David Goffin in straight sets. As a result he moved more than 10 positions up to a career high in the top 60 in the rankings.

He made his Masters 1000 debut at the 2023 BNP Paribas Open where he lost to wildcard Jack Sock. At the 2023 Miami Open he recorded his first Masters win over qualifier Roman Safiullin having never won a match at this level. He then defeated 11th seed Cameron Norrie in straight sets for his biggest and first top-20 win to reach the third round of a Masters for the first time in his career. In the third round, Barrère lost to Christopher Eubanks in a match, that had a rain delay lasting almost two hours. At the 2023 Mutua Madrid Open he lost in the second round to 26th seed Grigor Dimitrov. At the Italian Open he reached the third round defeating Brandon Nakashima and upsetting eleventh seed Karen Khachanov. He reached the top 55 in the rankings on 22 May 2023. He followed with a first round loss at the 2023 French Open.

He made his top 50 debut following a semifinal showing at the 2023 Eastbourne International. At age 29, this was Barrère's first semifinal on the ATP Tour.

=== 2024-25: Second ATP semifinal, retirement ===
Ranked No. 128, he reached his second ATP semifinal at the 2024 Țiriac Open as a qualifier defeating Thanasi Kokkinakis, third seed Sebastian Korda and eight seed Pedro Martinez en route.

In May 2025, during the French Open, Barrère announced that he would retire from professional tennis at the end of the 2025 season. Barrère played his last match on 9 November 2025.

== Performance timeline ==
Key
W	F	SF	QF	#R	RR	Q#	P#	DNQ	A	Z#	PO	G	S	B	NMS	NTI	P	NH

(W) winner; (F) finalist; (SF) semifinalist; (QF) quarterfinalist; (#R) rounds 4, 3, 2, 1; (RR) round-robin stage; (Q#) qualification round; (P#) preliminary round; (DNQ) did not qualify; (A) absent; (Z#) Davis/Fed Cup Zonal Group (with number indication) or (PO) play-off; (G) gold, (S) silver or (B) bronze Olympic/Paralympic medal; (NMS) not a Masters tournament; (NTI) not a Tier I tournament; (P) postponed; (NH) not held; (SR) strike rate (events won / competed); (W–L) win–loss record.
To avoid confusion and double counting, these charts are updated at the conclusion of a tournament or when the player's participation has ended.

=== Singles ===
Tournament	2015	2016	2017	2018	2019	2020	2021	2022	2023	2024	2025	SR	W–L	Win%
Grand Slam Tournaments
Australian Open	A	A	A	A	Q2	2R	A	Q1	1R	1R	Q1	0 / 3	1–3	25%
French Open	Q1	1R	Q1	1R	2R	1R	1R	2R	1R	1R	Q1	0 / 8	2–8	20%
Wimbledon	A	Q2	A	1R	2R	NH	1R	Q1	2R	Q1	A	0 / 4	2–4	33%
US Open	A	Q1	A	Q2	2R	2R	A	Q2	1R	Q1	A	0 / 3	2–3	40%
Win–loss	0–0	0–1	0–0	0–2	3–3	2–3	0–2	1–1	1–4	0–2	0–0	0 / 18	7–18	28%
ATP Masters 1000
Indian Wells Open	A	A	A	A	A	NH	A	A	1R	A	A	0 / 1	0–1	0%
Miami Open	A	A	A	A	A	NH	A	A	3R	A	A	0 / 1	2–1	67%
Monte-Carlo Masters	A	A	A	A	A	NH	A	A	Q1	A	A	0 / 0	0–0	–
Madrid Open	A	A	A	A	A	NH	A	A	2R	Q1	A	0 / 1	1–1	50%
Italian Open	A	A	A	A	A	A	Q1	A	3R	1R	A	0 / 2	2–2	50%
Canadian Open	A	A	A	A	Q1	NH	A	A	1R	A	A	0 / 1	0–1	0%
Cincinnati Open	A	A	A	A	A	Q1	A	A	1R	A	A	0 / 1	0–1	0%
Shanghai Masters	A	A	A	A	A	NH			2R	A	A	0 / 1	1–1	50%
Paris Masters	Q1	A	A	Q1	A	A	A	A	Q2	A	A	0 / 0	0–0	–
Win–loss	0–0	0–0	0–0	0–0	0–0	0–0	0–0	0–0	6–7	0–1	0–0	0 / 8	6–8	43%
Year-end ranking	265	247	624	163	82	109	166	90	84	162	516			

=== Doubles ===
Tournament	2016	2017	2018	2019	2020	2021	2022	2023	2024	2025	SR	W–L	Win%
Australian Open	A	A	A	A	2R	A	A	A	A	A	0 / 1	1–1	50%
French Open	2R	1R	A	3R	1R	1R	A	A	3R	1R	0 / 7	5–7	42%
Wimbledon	A	A	A	A	NH	A	A	1R	A	A	0 / 1	0–1	0%
US Open	A	A	A	A	A	A	A	2R	A	A	0 / 1	0–1	0%
Win–loss	1–1	0–1	0–0	2–1	1–2	0–1	0–0	1–2	2–1	0–1	0 / 10	7–10	41%

== Challenger and ITF tour finals ==
=== Singles: 24 (12–12) ===
Legend (singles) ATP Challenger Tour (6–8) Futures Tour (6–4)	Finals by surface Hard (8–10) Clay (4–2) Grass (0–0) Carpet (0–0)

Result	W–L	Date	Tournament	Tier	Surface	Opponent	Score
Win	1–0	Aug 2013	Belgium F9, Koksijde	Futures	Clay	(Belgium) Joris De Loore	3–6, 7–5, 6–3
Loss	1–1	Mar 2015	Quimper, France	Challenger	Hard (i)	(France) Benoît Paire	4–6, 6–3, 4–6
Loss	1–2	Sep 2015	France F17, Bagnères-de-Bigorre	Futures	Hard	(Belgium) Niels Desein	5–7, 3–6
Win	2–2	Sep 2015	France F18, Mulhouse	Futures	Hard (i)	(France) David Guez	6–3, 6–2
Loss	2–3	Oct 2015	France F21, Nevers	Futures	Hard (i)	(Czech Republic) Jan Mertl	4–6, 6–7^{(4–7)}
Loss	2–4	Oct 2015	France F22, Rodez	Futures	Hard (i)	(Italy) Lorenzo Giustino	3–6, 7–6^{(7–2)}, 1–6
Win	3–4	Apr 2016	France F8, Angers	Futures	Clay (i)	(France) Jonathan Eysseric	7–6^{(7–2)}, 6–4
Loss	3–5	Oct 2017	Great Britain F6, Barnstaple	Futures	Hard (i)	(United Kingdom) Tom Farquharson	5–7, 3–6
Win	4–5	Jan 2018	France F1, Bagnoles-de-l'Orne	Futures	Clay (i)	(Netherlands) Boy Westerhof	6–4, 7–5
Win	5–5	Jan 2018	France F2, Bressuire	Futures	Hard (i)	(France) Albano Olivetti	6–3, 6–7^{(6–8)}, 7–6^{(7–5)}
Win	6–5	Mar 2018	Lille, France	Challenger	Hard (i)	(Germany) Tobias Kamke	6–1, 6–4
Win	7–5	Apr 2018	France F8, Angers	Futures	Clay (i)	(France) Johan Sébastien Tatlot	6–7^{(2–7)}, 7–6^{(7–5)}, 6–4
Loss	7–6	May 2018	Bordeaux, France	Challenger	Clay	(United States) Reilly Opelka	7–6^{(7–5)}, 4–6, 5–7
Win	8–6	Feb 2019	Quimper, France	Challenger	Hard (i)	(United Kingdom) Daniel Evans	4–6, 6–2, 6–3
Win	9–6	Mar 2019	Lille, France	Challenger	Hard	(Germany) Yannick Maden	6–2, 4–6, 6–4
Loss	9-7	Sep 2019	Orleans, France	Challenger	Hard (i)	(Sweden) Mikael Ymer	3–6, 5–7
Loss	9-8	Mar 2021	Lille, France	Challenger	Hard (i)	(Belgium) Zizou Bergs	6–4, 1–6, 6–7^{(5–7)}
Loss	9–9	Jan 2022	Quimper, France	Challenger	Hard (i)	(Canada) Vasek Pospisil	4–6, 6–3, 1–6
Loss	9–10	May 2022	Aix-en-Provence, France	Challenger	Clay	(France) Benjamin Bonzi	2–6, 4–6
Loss	9-11	Jul 2022	Pozoblanco, Spain	Challenger	Hard	(France) Constant Lestienne	0–6, 6–7^{(3–7)}
Win	10–11	Oct 2022	Orléans, France	Challenger	Hard (i)	(France) Quentin Halys	4–6, 6–3, 6–4
Win	11–11	Oct 2022	Brest, France	Challenger	Hard (i)	(France) Luca Van Assche	6–3, 6–3
Win	12–11	Jan 2023	Quimper, France	Challenger	Hard (i)	(France) Arthur Fils	6–1, 6–4
Loss	12–12	Jan 2025	Nonthaburi, Thailand	Challenger	Hard	Aslan Karatsev	6–7^{(5–7)}, 5–7

=== Doubles: 21 (11–10) ===
Legend (doubles) ATP Challenger Tour (5–2) Futures Tour (6–8)	Finals by surface Hard (5–7) Clay (6–3) Grass (0–0) Carpet (0–0)

Result	W–L	Date	Tournament	Tier	Surface	Partner	Opponents	Score
Loss	0–1	Jul 2012	France F11, Toulon	Futures	Clay	(France) Lucas Pouille	(France) Olivier Patience (France) Nicolas Renavand	3–6, 6–4, [8–10]
Win	1–1	Apr 2014	Greece F5, Heraklion	Futures	Hard	(France) Tristan Lamasine	(Czech Republic) Marek Jaloviec (Czech Republic) Václav Šafránek	7–6^{(7–4)}, 6–2
Loss	1–2	Apr 2014	Greece F7, Heraklion	Futures	Hard	(France) Elie Rousset	(Germany) Florian Barth (Germany) Daniel Masur	2–6, 2–6
Win	2–2	Aug 2014	Georgia F2, Telavi	Futures	Clay	(Switzerland) Luca Margaroli	(Italy) Riccardo Bonadio (Italy) Gianluca Mager	7–6^{(7–5)}, 7–6^{(7–5)}
Win	3–2	Aug 2014	Georgia F3, Telavi	Futures	Clay	(Switzerland) Luca Margaroli	(Russia) Niko Muradashvili (Russia) Evgenii Tiurnev	6–1, 6–1
Loss	3–3	Oct 2014	Zimbabwe F1, Harare	Futures	Hard	(France) Arthur Surreaux	(Netherlands) Antal van der Duim (Netherlands) Boy Westerhof	6–3, 2–6, [7–10]
Win	4–3	Oct 2014	Zimbabwe F2, Harare	Futures	Hard	(France) Arthur Surreaux	(South Africa) Keith-Patrick Crowley (South Africa) Ruan Roelofse	6–1, 6–2
Win	5–3	May 2015	Croatia F8, Bol	Futures	Clay	(France) Jérôme Inzerillo	(Croatia) Ivan Sabanov (Croatia) Matej Sabanov	4–6, 7–5, [10–6]
Loss	5–4	Aug 2015	USA F24, Decatur	Futures	Hard	(France) Tom Jomby	(United States) Evan King (United States) Kevin King	0–6, 2–6
Loss	5–5	Sep 2015	France F17, Bagnères-de-Bigorre	Futures	Hard	(France) Alexandre Sidorenko	(France) Tom Jomby (France) Mick Lescure	6–4, 3–6, [4–10]
Loss	5–6	Jan 2016	Nouméa, New Caledonia	Challenger	Hard	(France) Tristan Lamasine	(France) Julien Benneteau (France) Édouard Roger-Vasselin	6–7^{(4–7)}, 6–3, [5–10]
Loss	5–7	Apr 2016	France F8, Angers	Futures	Clay (i)	(France) Adrien Puget	(Belgium) Maxime Authom (France) Jonathan Eysseric	3–6, 0–6
Win	6–7	Jun 2016	Lyon, France	Challenger	Clay	(France) Tristan Lamasine	(France) Jonathan Eysseric (Croatia) Franko Škugor	2–6, 6–3, [10–6]
Win	7–7	Jan 2017	Bangkok, Thailand	Challenger	Hard	(France) Jonathan Eysseric	(Japan) Yūichi Sugita (China) Wu Di	6–3, 6–2
Loss	7–8	Mar 2017	Canada F1, Gatineau	Futures	Hard (i)	(France) Laurent Lokoli	(Latvia) Miķelis Lībietis (France) Hugo Nys	6–7^{(4–7)}, 3–6
Win	8–8	Apr 2017	France F9, Angers	Futures	Clay (i)	(France) Alexis Musialek	(Belgium) Maxime Authom (France) Grégoire Jacq	6–3, 3–6, [10–4]
Loss	8–9	Nov 2017	Estonia F3, Tallinn	Futures	Hard (i)	(Belgium) Maxime Authom	(Finland) Harri Heliövaara (Finland) Patrik Niklas-Salminen	2–6, 3–6
Win	9–9	May 2019	Bordeaux, France	Challenger	Clay	(France) Quentin Halys	(Monaco) Romain Arneodo (Monaco) Hugo Nys	6–4, 6–1
Win	10–9	Nov 2020	Parma, Italy	Challenger	Hard (i)	(France) Albano Olivetti	(France) Sadio Doumbia (France) Fabien Reboul	6–2, 6–4
Win	11-9	Jan 2021	Quimper, France	Challenger	Hard (i)	(France) Albano Olivetti	(United States) James Cerretani (Switzerland) Marc-Andrea Hüsler	5–7, 7–6^{(9–7)}, [10–8]
Loss	11-10	Apr 2021	Split, Croatia	Challenger	Clay	(France) Albano Olivetti	(Poland) Szymon Walków (Poland) Jan Zieliński	2-6, 5-7
