= Play In Challenger =

- 2026 Play In Challenger

ATP Challenger Tour
- Event name: Play In Challenger -Lille
- Founded: 2018
- Editions: 8 (2026)
- Location: Lille, France
- Venue: Tennis Club Lillois Lille Métropole
- Category: ATP Challenger Tour 125
- Surface: Hard (Indoor)
- Draw: 32S/24Q/16D
- Prize money: €214,000 (2027)
- Website: website

Current champions (2026)
- Singles: (France) Luca Van Assche
- Doubles: Ivan Liutarevic (Poland) Filip Pieczonka

The Play In Challenger is a professional tennis tournament part of the ATP Challenger Tour, played on indoor hardcourts. It is held annually in Lille, France. Its predecessor is the Open du Nord, a tournament that has been part of the ITF Men's Circuit from 2002 until 2017. In 2025 it was upgraded to a Challenger 125 event. Next edition will be held from 15 to 21 February 2027.

== Past finals ==
=== Singles ===
Year	Champion	Runner-up	Score
2018	(France) Grégoire Barrère (1)	(Germany) Tobias Kamke	6–1, 6–4
2019	(France) Grégoire Barrère (2)	(Germany) Yannick Maden	6–2, 4–6, 6–4
2020	Not held due to COVID-19 pandemic in France		
2021	(Belgium) Zizou Bergs	(France) Grégoire Barrère	4–6, 6–1, 7–6^{(7–5)}
2022	(France) Quentin Halys	(Lithuania) Ričardas Berankis	4–6, 7–6^{(7–4)}, 6–4
2023	(Finland) Otto Virtanen	(Australia) Max Purcell	6–7^{(3–7)}, 6–4, 6–2
2024	(France) Arthur Rinderknech	(Belgium) Joris De Loore	6–4, 3–6, 7–6^{(10–8)}
2025	(France) Arthur Bouquier	(France) Lucas Pouille	6–3, 3–5 ret.
2026	(France) Luca Van Assche	(Belgium) Alexander Blockx	6–2, 6–4

=== Doubles ===
Year	Champions	Runners-up	Score
2018	(France) Hugo Nys (1) (Germany) Tim Pütz	(India) Jeevan Nedunchezhiyan (India) Purav Raja	7–6^{(7–3)}, 1–6, [10–7]
2019	(Monaco) Romain Arneodo (France) Hugo Nys (2)	(Israel) Jonathan Erlich (France) Fabrice Martin	7–5, 5–7, [10–8]
2020	Not held due to COVID-19 pandemic in France		
2021	(France) Benjamin Bonzi (France) Antoine Hoang	(France) Dan Added (Belgium) Michael Geerts	6–3, 6–1
2022	(Norway) Viktor Durasovic (Finland) Patrik Niklas-Salminen	(France) Jonathan Eysseric (France) Quentin Halys	7–5, 7–6^{(7–1)}
2023	(Australia) Max Purcell (Australia) Jason Taylor	(Jamaica) Dustin Brown (Pakistan) Aisam-ul-Haq Qureshi	7–6^{(7–3)}, 6–4
2024	(United States) Christian Harrison (United Kingdom) Marcus Willis	(France) Titouan Droguet (France) Giovanni Mpetshi Perricard	7–6^{(8–6)}, 6–3
2025	(Switzerland) Jakub Paul (Netherlands) David Pel	(Poland) Karol Drzewiecki (Poland) Piotr Matuszewski	6–3, 6–4
2026	Ivan Liutarevich (Poland) Filip Pieczonka	(Switzerland) Jakub Paul (Czech Republic) Matěj Vocel	6–4, 3–6, [10–8]
