= 2024 Teréga Open Pau–Pyrénées – Doubles =

Pyrénées – Doubles
- 2024 Teréga Open Pau–Pyrénées

Final
- Champions: (United States) Christian Harrison (United States) Brandon Nakashima
- Runners-up: (Monaco) Romain Arneodo (Austria) Sam Weissborn
- Score: 7–6^{(7–5)}, 6–4

Events
Singles	Doubles
← 2023 ·	Teréga Open Pau–Pyrénées	· 2025 →

Dan Added and Albano Olivetti were the defending champions but only Olivetti chose to defend his title, partnering Jonathan Eysseric. Olivetti lost in the semifinals to Christian Harrison and Brandon Nakashima.

Harrison and Nakashima won the title after defeating Romain Arneodo and Sam Weissborn 7–6^{(7–5)}, 6–4 in the final.

== Seeds ==
1. (Monaco) Romain Arneodo / (Austria) Sam Weissborn (final)
2. (Serbia) Nikola Ćaćić / (Ukraine) Denys Molchanov (quarterfinals, withdrew)
3. (Germany) Constantin Frantzen / (Germany) Hendrik Jebens (semifinals)
4. (France) Jonathan Eysseric / (France) Albano Olivetti (semifinals)

== Draw ==
Key

- Q = Qualifier
- WC = Wild card
- LL = Lucky loser
- Alt = Alternate
- ITF = ITF entry
- PR = Protected ranking
- SR = Special ranking
- SE = Special exempt
- JE = Junior exempt
- JR = Junior Accelerator Programme entrant
- CO = College Accelerator Programme entrant
- NG = Next Gen Accelerator Program entrant
- w/o = Walkover
- r = Retired
- d = Defaulted

First round
1	(Monaco) R Arneodo (Austria) S Weissborn	1	6	[10]
(Sweden) F Bergevi (Netherlands) M Veldheer	6	3	[7]
(France) M Guinard (France) G Jacq	6	6
WC	(France) Louis Dussin (France) Maxence Rivet	4	4
3	(Germany) C Frantzen (Germany) H Jebens	6	6
WC	(France) C Chidekh (Israel) R Stepanov	3	2
Alt	(Netherlands) G Brouwer (United States) G Goldhoff	7	3	[8]
(United Kingdom) L Johnson (Finland) P Niklas-Salminen	5	6	[10]
I Liutarevich (Ukraine) V Manafov	5	3
(France) P-H Herbert (Switzerland) L Riedi	7	6
(Italy) M Bortolotti (Spain) S Martos Gornés	3	2
4	(France) J Eysseric (France) A Olivetti	6	6
(South Africa) L Harris (France) B Paire	6	3	[7]
(United States) C Harrison (United States) B Nakashima	2	6	[10]
(Poland) K Drzewiecki (Czech Republic) Z Kolář	2	5
2	(Serbia) N Ćaćić (Ukraine) D Molchanov	6	7

Quarterfinals
1	(Monaco) R Arneodo (Austria) S Weissborn	6	6^{6}	[10]
(France) M Guinard (France) G Jacq	3	7^{8}	[8]
3	(Germany) C Frantzen (Germany) H Jebens	6	7^{9}
(United Kingdom) L Johnson (Finland) P Niklas-Salminen	3	6^{7}
(France) P-H Herbert (Switzerland) L Riedi	6^{2}	6^{4}
4	(France) J Eysseric (France) A Olivetti	7^{7}	7^{7}
(United States) C Harrison (United States) B Nakashima	w/o
2	(Serbia) N Ćaćić (Ukraine) D Molchanov

Semifinals
1	(Monaco) R Arneodo (Austria) S Weissborn	6	6^{2}	[10]
3	(Germany) C Frantzen (Germany) H Jebens	4	7^{7}	[8]
4	(France) J Eysseric (France) A Olivetti	4	5
(United States) C Harrison (United States) B Nakashima	6	7

Final
1	(Monaco) R Arneodo (Austria) S Weissborn	6^{5}	4
(United States) C Harrison (United States) B Nakashima	7^{7}	6
