= 2020 Teréga Open Pau–Pyrénées – Doubles =

Pyrénées – Doubles
- 2020 Teréga Open Pau–Pyrénées

Final
- Champions: (France) Benjamin Bonzi (France) Antoine Hoang
- Runners-up: (Italy) Simone Bolelli (Romania) Florin Mergea
- Score: 6–3, 6–2

Events
Singles	Doubles
← 2019 ·	Teréga Open Pau–Pyrénées	· 2021 →

Scott Clayton and Adil Shamasdin were the defending champions but only Shamasdin chose to defend his title, partnering Purav Raja. Shamasdin lost in the first round to Antonio Šančić and Tristan-Samuel Weissborn.

Benjamin Bonzi and Antoine Hoang won the title after defeating Simone Bolelli and Florin Mergea 6–3, 6–2 in the final.

== Seeds ==
1. (United Kingdom) Dominic Inglot / (Pakistan) Aisam-ul-Haq Qureshi (first round)
2. (Denmark) Frederik Nielsen / (Germany) Tim Pütz (quarterfinals)
3. (Israel) Jonathan Erlich / (Belarus) Andrei Vasilevski (first round)
4. (Chinese Taipei) Hsieh Cheng-peng / (Ukraine) Denys Molchanov (quarterfinals)

== Draw ==
=== Key ===
- Q = Qualifier
- WC = Wild card
- LL = Lucky loser
- Alt = Alternate
- SE = Special exempt
- PR = Protected ranking
- ITF = ITF entry
- JE = Junior exempt
- w/o = Walkover
- r = Retired
- d = Defaulted
- SR = Special ranking

First round
1	(United Kingdom) D Inglot (Pakistan) A-u-H Qureshi	3	6^{4}
Alt	(France) B Bonzi (France) A Hoang	6	7^{7}
(Croatia) I Sabanov (Croatia) M Sabanov	5	3
(Switzerland) L Margaroli (Italy) A Vavassori	7	6
4	(Chinese Taipei) C-p Hsieh (Ukraine) D Molchanov	1	6	[10]
Alt	(France) H Gaston (France) C Lestienne	6	3	[4]
(Croatia) A Šančić (Austria) T-S Weissborn	6	7
(India) P Raja (Canada) A Shamasdin	1	5
(Spain) G Granollers (Spain) S Martos Gornés	6	6
WC	(Sweden) Leo Borg (France) Matthieu Perchicot	1	2
(Russia) T Gabashvili (Slovakia) L Lacko	6^{4}	7^{7}	[10]
3	(Israel) J Erlich (Belarus) A Vasilevski	7^{7}	6^{4}	[8]
(France) S Doumbia (France) F Reboul	4	7^{7}	[8]
(Italy) S Bolelli (Romania) F Mergea	6	6^{5}	[10]
(Bosnia and Herzegovina) T Brkić (Spain) D Vega Hernández	4	3
2	(Denmark) F Nielsen (Germany) T Pütz	6	6

Quarterfinals
Alt	(France) B Bonzi (France) A Hoang	6	3	[10]
(Switzerland) L Margaroli (Italy) A Vavassori	3	6	[5]
4	(Chinese Taipei) C-p Hsieh (Ukraine) D Molchanov	3	4
(Croatia) A Šančić (Austria) T-S Weissborn	6	6
(Spain) G Granollers (Spain) S Martos Gornés	6	3	[5]
(Russia) T Gabashvili (Slovakia) L Lacko	4	6	[10]
(Italy) S Bolelli (Romania) F Mergea	6	6
2	(Denmark) F Nielsen (Germany) T Pütz	3	2

Semifinals
Alt	(France) B Bonzi (France) A Hoang	6	7^{7}
(Croatia) A Šančić (Austria) T-S Weissborn	3	6^{3}
(Russia) T Gabashvili (Slovakia) L Lacko	6^{6}	1
(Italy) S Bolelli (Romania) F Mergea	7^{8}	6

Final
Alt	(France) B Bonzi (France) A Hoang	6	6
(Italy) S Bolelli (Romania) F Mergea	3	2
