= 2023 Teréga Open Pau–Pyrénées – Doubles =

Pyrénées – Doubles
- 2023 Teréga Open Pau–Pyrénées

Final
- Champions: (France) Dan Added (France) Albano Olivetti
- Runners-up: (United Kingdom) Julian Cash (Germany) Constantin Frantzen
- Score: 3–6, 6–1, [10–8]

Events
Singles	Doubles
← 2022 ·	Teréga Open Pau–Pyrénées	· 2024 →

Albano Olivetti and David Vega Hernández were the defending champions but only Olivetti chose to defend his title, partnering Dan Added. Olivetti successfully defended his title.

Added and Olivetti won the title after defeating Julian Cash and Constantin Frantzen 3–6, 6–1, [10–8] in the final.

== Seeds ==
1. (Czech Republic) Roman Jebavý / (Czech Republic) Adam Pavlásek (semifinals)
2. (Netherlands) Sander Arends / (Netherlands) David Pel (first round)
3. (France) Dan Added / (France) Albano Olivetti (champions)
4. (Jamaica) Dustin Brown / (France) Jonathan Eysseric (first round)

== Draw ==
=== Key ===
- Q = Qualifier
- WC = Wild card
- LL = Lucky loser
- Alt = Alternate
- SE = Special exempt
- PR = Protected ranking
- ITF = ITF entry
- JE = Junior exempt
- w/o = Walkover
- r = Retired
- d = Defaulted
- SR = Special ranking

First round
1	(Czech Republic) R Jebavý (Czech Republic) A Pavlásek	7^{7}	4	[10]
(Ukraine) V Manafov (Ukraine) O Prihodko	6^{4}	6	[8]
(France) M Guinard (United States) H Reese	2	6	[10]
WC	(Sweden) F Bergevi (Poland) Ł Kubot	6	3	[5]
3	(France) D Added (France) A Olivetti	6	6^{5}	[10]
(Czech Republic) Z Kolář (Slovakia) I Zelenay	4	7^{7}	[3]
(Austria) N Oberleitner (Austria) P Oswald	6	6
(Norway) V Durasovic (Japan) K Uchida	4	2
(Poland) K Drzewiecki (Poland) S Walków	6	6
(Netherlands) G Brouwer (Netherlands) J Sels	4	4
(Germany) H Jebens (Ukraine) D Molchanov	6	3	[12]
4	(Jamaica) D Brown (France) J Eysseric	4	6	[10]
(United Kingdom) J Cash (Germany) C Frantzen	7	6
WC	(France) T Arribagé (France) L Sanchez	5	2
(Romania) VV Cornea (Croatia) F Škugor	7	6^{5}	[11]
2	(Netherlands) S Arends (Netherlands) D Pel	5	7^{7}	[9]

Quarterfinals
1	(Czech Republic) R Jebavý (Czech Republic) A Pavlásek	3	6	[10]
(France) M Guinard (United States) H Reese	6	2	[6]
3	(France) D Added (France) A Olivetti	6	5	[10]
(Austria) N Oberleitner (Austria) P Oswald	3	7	[2]
(Poland) K Drzewiecki (Poland) S Walków	7^{7}	6
(Germany) H Jebens (Ukraine) D Molchanov	6^{4}	4
(United Kingdom) J Cash (Germany) C Frantzen	6^{3}	6	[10]
(Romania) VV Cornea (Croatia) F Škugor	7^{7}	4	[8]

Semifinals
1	(Czech Republic) R Jebavý (Czech Republic) A Pavlásek	6^{2}	3
3	(France) D Added (France) A Olivetti	7^{7}	6
(Poland) K Drzewiecki (Poland) S Walków	6	3	[2]
(United Kingdom) J Cash (Germany) C Frantzen	2	6	[10]

Final
3	(France) D Added (France) A Olivetti	3	6	[10]
(United Kingdom) J Cash (Germany) C Frantzen	6	1	[8]
