= 2022 Teréga Open Pau–Pyrénées – Singles =

Pyrénées – Singles
- 2022 Teréga Open Pau–Pyrénées

Final
- Champion: (France) Quentin Halys
- Runner-up: (Canada) Vasek Pospisil
- Score: 4–6, 6–4, 6–3

Events
Singles	Doubles
← 2021 ·	Teréga Open Pau–Pyrénées	· 2023 →

Radu Albot was the defending champion but lost in the second round to Antoine Escoffier.

Quentin Halys won the title after defeating Vasek Pospisil 4–6, 6–4, 6–3 in the final.

== Seeds ==
1. (France) Benjamin Bonzi (withdrew)
2. (France) Richard Gasquet (withdrew)
3. (Czech Republic) Jiří Lehečka (first round)
4. (France) Pierre-Hugues Herbert (second round)
5. (Slovakia) Norbert Gombos (first round)
6. (France) Gilles Simon (quarterfinals)
7. (France) Quentin Halys (champion)
8. (Canada) Vasek Pospisil (final)

== Draw ==
=== Key ===
- Q = Qualifier
- WC = Wild card
- LL = Lucky loser
- Alt = Alternate
- SE = Special exempt
- PR = Protected ranking
- ITF = ITF entry
- JE = Junior exempt
- w/o = Walkover
- r = Retired
- d = Defaulted
- SR = Special ranking

=== Finals ===
Semifinals
8	(Canada) Vasek Pospisil	7^{7}	7^{7}
(France) Manuel Guinard	6^{2}	6^{4}
7	(France) Quentin Halys	7^{7}	6^{5}	6
(Russia) Roman Safiullin	6^{5}	7^{7}	4

Final
8	(Canada) Vasek Pospisil	6	4	3
7	(France) Quentin Halys	4	6	6

=== Top half ===
First round
LL	(Moldova) R Albot	6	5	6
Alt	(France) M Janvier	4	7	0
(Poland) K Żuk	6	3	4
Q	(France) A Escoffier	3	6	6
Q	(France) A Fils	7	6
LL	(China) Zh Zhang	5	0
(France) A Hoang	3	4
8	(Canada) V Pospisil	6	6
3	(Czech Republic) J Lehečka	0	2
(Kazakhstan) M Kukushkin	6	6
(Russia) A Kuznetsov	1	3^{r}
(France) M Guinard	6	5
(Belgium) R Bemelmans	4	6	6
WC	(Morocco) E Benchetrit	6	4	4
Q	(United States) Em Nava	4	6^{2}
6	(France) G Simon	6	7^{7}

Second round
LL	(Moldova) R Albot	6^{5}	6^{2}
Q	(France) A Escoffier	7^{7}	7^{7}
Q	(France) A Fils	3	4
8	(Canada) V Pospisil	6	6
(Kazakhstan) M Kukushkin	7^{7}	4	3
(France) M Guinard	6^{5}	6	6
(Belgium) R Bemelmans	6^{3}	5
6	(France) G Simon	7^{7}	7

Quarterfinals
Q	(France) A Escoffier	4	2
8	(Canada) V Pospisil	6	6
(France) M Guinard	6	6
6	(France) G Simon	2	2

Semifinals
8	(Canada) V Pospisil	7^{7}	7^{7}
(France) M Guinard	6^{2}	6^{4}

=== Bottom half ===
First round
7	(France) Q Halys	6	7^{7}
(France) A Müller	3	6^{3}
(Croatia) N Serdarušić	7^{7}	6
Alt	(Germany) N Kuhn	6^{3}	4
(France) G Barrère	6	6
WC	(France) H Mayot	3	3
(Switzerland) D Stricker	6	6^{2}	4
4	(France) P-H Herbert	4	7^{7}	6
5	(Slovakia) N Gombos	6	6^{5}	6^{2}
(France) L Pouille	2	7^{7}	7^{7}
(Russia) R Safiullin	6	7^{8}
WC	(France) J-W Tsonga	4	6^{6}
Q	(France) L Van Assche	3	2
(France) C Lestienne	6	6
Q	(Latvia) E Gulbis	3	6	6
Q	(United Kingdom) R Peniston	6	1	3

Second round
7	(France) Q Halys	6	6
(Croatia) N Serdarušić	4	4
(France) G Barrère	6^{9}	6	7
4	(France) P-H Herbert	7^{11}	3	5
(France) L Pouille
(Russia) R Safiullin	w/o
(France) C Lestienne	6	6
Q	(Latvia) E Gulbis	3	2

Quarterfinals
7	(France) Q Halys	6^{3}	6	6
(France) G Barrère	7^{7}	2	2
(Russia) R Safiullin	6	6
(France) C Lestienne	3	4

Semifinals
7	(France) Q Halys	7^{7}	6^{5}	6
(Russia) R Safiullin	6^{5}	7^{7}	4
