= 2024 Teréga Open Pau–Pyrénées – Singles =

Pyrénées – Singles
- 2024 Teréga Open Pau–Pyrénées

Final
- Champion: (Finland) Otto Virtanen
- Runner-up: (Switzerland) Leandro Riedi
- Score: 7–5, 7–5

Events
Singles	Doubles
← 2023 ·	Teréga Open Pau–Pyrénées	· 2025 →

Luca Van Assche was the defending champion but chose not to defend his title.

Otto Virtanen won the title after defeating Leandro Riedi 7–5, 7–5 in the final.

== Seeds ==
1. (Austria) Jurij Rodionov (second round)
2. (France) Arthur Rinderknech (first round)
3. (United States) Brandon Nakashima (semifinals)
4. (France) Grégoire Barrère (first round)
5. (France) Quentin Halys (second round)
6. (France) Benoît Paire (second round)
7. (France) Harold Mayot (first round)
8. (Belgium) David Goffin (first round)

== Draw ==
=== Key ===
- Q = Qualifier
- WC = Wild card
- LL = Lucky loser
- Alt = Alternate
- SE = Special exempt
- PR = Protected ranking
- ITF = ITF entry
- JE = Junior exempt
- w/o = Walkover
- r = Retired
- d = Defaulted
- SR = Special ranking

=== Finals ===
Semifinals
(Switzerland) Leandro Riedi	6	6
SE	(France) Clément Chidekh	3	3
3	(United States) Brandon Nakashima	4	6^{4}
(Finland) Otto Virtanen	6	7^{7}

Final
(Switzerland) Leandro Riedi	5	5
(Finland) Otto Virtanen	7	7

=== Top half ===
First round
1	(Austria) J Rodionov	7	7^{7}
(Czech Republic) Z Kolář	5	6^{4}
(Switzerland) L Riedi	6	6
Q	(Turkey) A Çelikbilek	4	3
(South Africa) L Harris	4	6	4
(Croatia) D Prižmić	6	4	6
(France) A Escoffier	6	6
7	(France) H Mayot	4	2
4	(France) G Barrère	6	3	2
Q	E Gerasimov	1	6	6
SE	(France) C Chidekh	6	6
Q	(United States) S Kirchheimer	2	3
WC	(United Kingdom) K Edmund	2	2
(France) T Droguet	6	6
WC	(France) Charlie Camus	1	2
5	(France) Q Halys	6	6

Second round
1	(Austria) J Rodionov	3	6^{4}
(Switzerland) L Riedi	6	7^{7}
(Croatia) D Prižmić	6	4	6
(France) A Escoffier	2	6	2
Q	E Gerasimov	2	3
SE	(France) C Chidekh	6	6
(France) T Droguet	6	7
5	(France) Q Halys	3	5

Quarterfinals
(Switzerland) L Riedi	3	6	7
(Croatia) D Prižmić	6	2	5
SE	(France) C Chidekh	7	3	7
(France) T Droguet	5	6	5

Semifinals
(Switzerland) L Riedi	6	6
SE	(France) C Chidekh	3	3

=== Bottom half ===
First round
8	(Belgium) D Goffin	6^{2}	7^{7}	5
(France) P-H Herbert	7^{7}	6^{3}	7
(Italy) M Bellucci	6	7^{7}
SE	(France) M Martineau	3	6^{5}
I Gakhov	3	0^{r}
Q	(Japan) J Trotter	6	0
(Belgium) J De Loore	4	4
3	(United States) B Nakashima	6	6
6	(France) B Paire	6	6
(United Kingdom) J Choinski	4	2
Q	(France) T Lamasine	5	6^{3}
(Finland) O Virtanen	7	7^{7}
(Netherlands) G Brouwer	4	6^{3}
WC	(France) L Pouille	6	7^{7}
Q	(Syria) H Naw	7^{7}	6^{3}	6
2	(France) A Rinderknech	6^{2}	7^{7}	2

Second round
(France) P-H Herbert	4	3
(Italy) M Bellucci	6	6
Q	(Japan) J Trotter	4	4
3	(United States) B Nakashima	6	6
6	(France) B Paire	0	6^{3}
(Finland) O Virtanen	6	7^{7}
WC	(France) L Pouille	6	6
Q	(Syria) H Naw	4	3

Quarterfinals
(Italy) M Bellucci	6	4	6^{2}
3	(United States) B Nakashima	3	6	7^{7}
(Finland) O Virtanen	7^{7}	7^{7}
WC	(France) L Pouille	6^{5}	6^{3}

Semifinals
3	(United States) B Nakashima	4	6^{4}
(Finland) O Virtanen	6	7^{7}
