= 2023 Teréga Open Pau–Pyrénées – Singles =

Pyrénées – Singles
- 2023 Teréga Open Pau–Pyrénées

Final
- Champion: (France) Luca Van Assche
- Runner-up: (France) Ugo Humbert
- Score: 7–6^{(7–5)}, 4–6, 7–6^{(8–6)}

Events
Singles	Doubles
← 2022 ·	Teréga Open Pau–Pyrénées	· 2024 →

Quentin Halys was the defending champion but chose not to defend his title.

Luca Van Assche won the title after defeating Ugo Humbert 7–6^{(7–5)}, 4–6, 7–6^{(8–6)} in the final.

== Seeds ==
1. (France) Arthur Rinderknech (semifinals)
2. (France) Ugo Humbert (final)
3. (Netherlands) Gijs Brouwer (second round)
4. (France) Arthur Fils (first round)
5. (Italy) Raúl Brancaccio (first round)
6. (Italy) Giulio Zeppieri (withdrew)
7. (Belgium) Zizou Bergs (second round)
8. (Austria) Jurij Rodionov (quarterfinals)
9. (Germany) Jan-Lennard Struff (quarterfinals)

== Draw ==
=== Key ===
- Q = Qualifier
- WC = Wild card
- LL = Lucky loser
- Alt = Alternate
- SE = Special exempt
- PR = Protected ranking
- ITF = ITF entry
- JE = Junior exempt
- w/o = Walkover
- r = Retired
- d = Defaulted
- SR = Special ranking

=== Finals ===
Semifinals
1	(France) Arthur Rinderknech	1	3
(France) Luca Van Assche	6	6
Alt	(Japan) Kaichi Uchida	1	2
2	(France) Ugo Humbert	6	6

Final
(France) Luca Van Assche	7^{7}	4	7^{8}
2	(France) Ugo Humbert	6^{5}	6	6^{6}

=== Top half ===
First round
1	(France) A Rinderknech	7	7^{9}
Q	(France) U Blanchet	5	6^{7}
(Hungary) F Marozsán	6^{7}	4
Q	(France) V Royer	7^{9}	6
LL	(France) D Added	7^{7}	6
WC	(France) G Debru	6^{3}	3
(France) M Guinard	0	2
9	(Germany) J-L Struff	6	6
3	(Netherlands) G Brouwer	6	6
(United States) Em Nava	3	1
Alt	(Australia) L Tu	4	6	1
(France) L Van Assche	6	3	6
(Slovakia) L Klein	6	3	6^{4}
Q	(Belgium) J De Loore	3	6	7^{7}
WC	(Estonia) M Lajal	2	6	3
8	(Austria) J Rodionov	6	3	6

Second round
1	(France) A Rinderknech	6	7^{7}
Q	(France) V Royer	2	6^{0}
LL	(France) D Added	1	3
9	(Germany) J-L Struff	6	6
3	(Netherlands) G Brouwer	6	3	6^{1}
(France) L Van Assche	3	6	7^{7}
Q	(Belgium) J De Loore	6	1	6^{6}
8	(Austria) J Rodionov	4	6	7^{8}

Quarterfinals
1	(France) A Rinderknech	6	6
9	(Germany) J-L Struff	4	4
(France) L Van Assche	4	6	6
8	(Austria) J Rodionov	6	3	3

Semifinals
1	(France) A Rinderknech	1	3
(France) L Van Assche	6	6

=== Bottom half ===
First round
5	(Italy) R Brancaccio	4	2
(France) L Lokoli	6	6
(Switzerland) A Ritschard	7^{7}	7^{8}
LL	(Germany) L Wessels	6^{4}	6^{6}
Q	(China) Y Bu	5	5
(Lithuania) R Berankis	7	7
Alt	(Japan) K Uchida	7^{7}	6
4	(France) A Fils	6^{5}	1
7	(Belgium) Z Bergs	4	6	6
(Hungary) Z Piros	6	2	3
Q	E Donskoy	4	2
(Switzerland) A Bellier	6	6
Q	(France) M Bourgue	6	7^{8}
(Netherlands) J Sels	1	6^{6}
WC	(France) C Hemery	3	7^{7}	4
2	(France) U Humbert	6	6^{3}	6

Second round
(France) L Lokoli	4	7	6
(Switzerland) A Ritschard	6	5	3
(Lithuania) R Berankis	2	5
Alt	(Japan) K Uchida	6	7
7	(Belgium) Z Bergs	7^{7}	4	4
(Switzerland) A Bellier	6^{3}	6	6
Q	(France) M Bourgue	4	4
2	(France) U Humbert	6	6

Quarterfinals
(France) L Lokoli	4	6	3
Alt	(Japan) K Uchida	6	3	6
(Switzerland) A Bellier	1	4
2	(France) U Humbert	6	6

Semifinals
Alt	(Japan) K Uchida	1	2
2	(France) U Humbert	6	6
