= 2020 Teréga Open Pau–Pyrénées – Singles =

Pyrénées – Singles
- 2020 Teréga Open Pau–Pyrénées

Final
- Champion: (Latvia) Ernests Gulbis
- Runner-up: (Poland) Jerzy Janowicz
- Score: 6–3, 6–4

Events
| Singles | Doubles |
| ← 2019 · | Teréga Open Pau–Pyrénées | · 2021 → |

Alexander Bublik was the defending champion but chose not to defend his title.

Ernests Gulbis won the title after defeating Jerzy Janowicz 6–3, 6–4 in the final.

== Seeds ==
All seeds receive a bye into the second round.

1. (Czech Republic) Jiří Veselý (semifinals)
2. (Slovakia) Norbert Gombos (second round)
3. (India) Sumit Nagal (second round)
4. (France) Antoine Hoang (second round)
5. (Germany) Yannick Maden (second round)
6. (Ukraine) Sergiy Stakhovsky (second round)
7. (Italy) Lorenzo Giustino (third round)
8. (Slovakia) Lukáš Lacko (third round)
9. (Netherlands) Robin Haase (second round)
10. (France) Maxime Janvier (second round)
11. (Argentina) Marco Trungelliti (second round)
12. (France) Quentin Halys (quarterfinals)
13. (France) Constant Lestienne (third round)
14. (France) Elliot Benchetrit (second round)
15. (Netherlands) Botic van de Zandschulp (second round)
16. (France) Enzo Couacaud (third round)

== Draw ==
=== Key ===
- Q = Qualifier
- WC = Wild card
- LL = Lucky loser
- Alt = Alternate
- SE = Special exempt
- PR = Protected ranking
- ITF = ITF entry
- JE = Junior exempt
- w/o = Walkover
- r = Retired
- d = Defaulted
- SR = Special ranking

=== Finals ===
Quarterfinals
1 | (Czech Republic) Jiří Veselý | 7^{7} | 7^{7}
WC | (France) Harold Mayot | 6^{3} | 6^{5}
(France) Hugo Grenier | 3 | 3
WC | (Poland) Jerzy Janowicz | 6 | 6
(Russia) Teymuraz Gabashvili | 6 | 2 | 7^{7}
WC | (France) Benjamin Bonzi | 4 | 6 | 6^{4}
12 | (France) Quentin Halys | 7^{7} | 4 | 2
(Latvia) Ernests Gulbis | 6^{2} | 6 | 6

Semifinals
1 | (Czech Republic) Jiří Veselý | 4 | 7^{8} | 6^{7}
WC | (Poland) Jerzy Janowicz | 6 | 6^{6} | 7^{9}
(Russia) Teymuraz Gabashvili | 3 | 7^{7} | 1
(Latvia) Ernests Gulbis | 6 | 6^{4} | 6

Final
WC | (Poland) Jerzy Janowicz | 3 | 4
(Latvia) Ernests Gulbis | 6 | 6

=== Top half ===
==== Section 1 ====
First round
(France) M Bourgue | 7^{7} | 6
Alt | (Italy) A Vavassori | 6^{5} | 3
Q | (France) F Reboul | 6 | 7
(Italy) F Baldi | 4 | 5
WC | (France) R Roumane | 1 | 1
WC | (France) H Mayot | 6 | 6
(Russia) A Karatsev | 3 | 6 | 1
(France) H Gaston | 6 | 1 | 6

Second round
1 | (Czech Republic) J Veselý | 6 | 6^{9} | 6
(France) M Bourgue | 4 | 7^{11} | 3
Q | (France) F Reboul | 5 | 3
13 | (France) C Lestienne | 7 | 6
9 | (Netherlands) R Haase | 6^{5} | 6^{3}
WC | (France) H Mayot | 7^{7} | 7^{7}
(France) H Gaston | 1 | 6 | 6
5 | (Germany) Y Maden | 6 | 4 | 4

Third round
1 | (Czech Republic) J Veselý | 6 | 7^{7}
13 | (France) C Lestienne | 4 | 6^{1}
WC | (France) H Mayot | 6 | 0
(France) H Gaston | 1 | 0^{r}

Quarterfinals
1 | (Czech Republic) J Veselý | 7^{7} | 7^{7}
WC | (France) H Mayot | 6^{3} | 6^{5}

==== Section 2 ====
First round
(Russia) E Karlovskiy | 3 | 6^{4}
(France) H Grenier | 6 | 7^{7}
(Germany) M Moraing | 6 | 6
(Chinese Taipei) T-l Wu | 0 | 0
(Czech Republic) Z Kolář | 4 | 5
WC | (Poland) J Janowicz | 6 | 7
PR | (Slovenia) B Kavčič | 3 | 6 | 6^{4}
(Croatia) B Gojo | 6 | 4 | 7^{7}

Second round
3 | (India) S Nagal | 1 | 6 | 3
(France) H Grenier | 6 | 2 | 6
(Germany) M Moraing | 3 | 4
16 | (France) E Couacaud | 6 | 6
10 | (France) M Janvier | 4 | 4
WC | (Poland) J Janowicz | 6 | 6
(Croatia) B Gojo | 6^{6} | 6^{4}
7 | (Italy) L Giustino | 7^{8} | 7^{7}

Third round
(France) H Grenier | 7^{7} | 7^{7}
16 | (France) E Couacaud | 6^{4} | 6^{4}
WC | (Poland) J Janowicz | 6 | 6^{5} | 6
7 | (Italy) L Giustino | 4 | 7^{7} | 3

Quarterfinals
(France) H Grenier | 3 | 3
WC | (Poland) J Janowicz | 6 | 6

=== Bottom half ===
==== Section 3 ====
First round
Alt | (Austria) L Miedler | 4 | 6^{3}
(Russia) T Gabashvili | 6 | 7^{7}
(Ukraine) I Marchenko | 3 | 7^{12} | 6
(Germany) M Bachinger | 6 | 6^{10} | 4
WC | (France) B Bonzi | 6 | 6
Q | (Chinese Taipei) C-h Tseng | 3 | 2
(Russia) P Kotov | 2 | 7^{9} | 6
(France) T Lamasine | 6 | 6^{7} | 4

Second round
6 | (Ukraine) S Stakhovsky | 6^{1} | 2
(Russia) T Gabashvili | 7^{7} | 6
(Ukraine) I Marchenko | 2 | 7 | 6
11 | (Argentina) M Trungelliti | 6 | 5 | 1
14 | (France) E Benchetrit | 5 | 3
WC | (France) B Bonzi | 7 | 6
(Russia) P Kotov | 6 | 5 | 6
4 | (France) A Hoang | 4 | 7 | 2

Third round
(Russia) T Gabashvili | 6 | 5 | 7
(Ukraine) I Marchenko | 4 | 7 | 5
WC | (France) B Bonzi | 6 | 6
(Russia) P Kotov | 4 | 0

Quarterfinals
(Russia) T Gabashvili | 6 | 2 | 7^{7}
WC | (France) B Bonzi | 4 | 6 | 6^{4}

==== Section 4 ====
First round
PR | (Belgium) A De Greef | 7^{7} | 6^{3} | 6^{2}
(India) S Mukund | 6^{5} | 7^{7} | 7^{7}
(Italy) M Viola | 6 | 6
(Spain) B Zapata Miralles | 3 | 4
(Japan) H Moriya | 2 | 7^{7} | 4
(Slovakia) A Molčan | 6 | 6^{3} | 6
WC | (Sweden) L Borg | 2 | 3
(Latvia) E Gulbis | 6 | 6

Second round
8 | (Slovakia) L Lacko | 6 | 7^{7}
(India) S Mukund | 4 | 6^{3}
(Italy) M Viola | 1 | 2
12 | (France) Q Halys | 6 | 6
15 | (Netherlands) B van de Zandschulp | 6^{5} | 6 | 5
(Slovakia) A Molčan | 7^{7} | 4 | 7
(Latvia) E Gulbis | 7^{9} | 7^{7}
2 | (Slovakia) N Gombos | 6^{7} | 6^{1}

Third round
8 | (Slovakia) L Lacko | 6^{2} | 2
12 | (France) Q Halys | 7^{7} | 6
(Slovakia) A Molčan | 1 | 7^{7} | 4
(Latvia) E Gulbis | 6 | 6^{3} | 6

Quarterfinals
12 | (France) Q Halys | 7^{7} | 4 | 2
(Latvia) E Gulbis | 6^{2} | 6 | 6
