= 2026 Teréga Open Pau–Pyrénées =

- Date: 9 – 15 February
- Edition: 8th
- Surface: Hard (indoor)
- Location: Pau, France

Champions

Singles
- (Belgium) Raphaël Collignon

Doubles
- (India) Sriram Balaji / (Austria) Neil Oberleitner
- Teréga Open Pau–Pyrénées

The 2026 Teréga Open Pau–Pyrénées was a professional tennis tournament played on indoor hardcourts. It was the eighth edition of the tournament which was part of the 2026 ATP Challenger Tour. It took place in Pau, France between 9 and 15 February 2026.

== Singles main-draw entrants ==
=== Seeds ===
Country	Player	Rank^{1}	Seed
BEL	Raphaël Collignon	72	1
KAZ	Alexander Shevchenko	87	2
BEL	Alexander Blockx	105	3
ITA	Luca Nardi	106	4
BEL	David Goffin	115	5
FRA	Luca Van Assche	127	6
FRA	Benjamin Bonzi	128	7
TUN	Moez Echargui	142	8

- ^{1} Rankings are as of 2 February 2026.

=== Other entrants ===
The following players received wildcards into the singles main draw:

- (France) Arthur Bouquier
- (Belgium) David Goffin
- (France) Moïse Kouamé

The following players received entry into the singles main draw as special exempts:

- Pavel Kotov
- (Ukraine) Oleg Prihodko

The following player received entry into the singles main draw as an alternate:

- (France) Dan Added

The following players received entry from the qualifying draw:

- (France) Felix Balshaw
- (Switzerland) Rémy Bertola
- (Germany) Henri Squire
- (France) Clément Tabur
- (Japan) James Trotter
- (Germany) Patrick Zahraj

The following player received entry as a lucky loser:

- (Kazakhstan) Mikhail Kukushkin

== Champions ==
=== Singles ===
- (Belgium) Raphaël Collignon def. (France) Benjamin Bonzi 7–6^{(7–5)}, 6–1.

=== Doubles ===
- (India) Sriram Balaji / (Austria) Neil Oberleitner def. (Switzerland) Jakub Paul / (Czech Republic) Matěj Vocel 1–6, 6–3, [13–11].
