= 2022 Teréga Open Pau–Pyrénées – Doubles =

Pyrénées – Doubles
- 2022 Teréga Open Pau–Pyrénées

Final
- Champions: (France) Albano Olivetti (Spain) David Vega Hernández
- Runners-up: (Poland) Karol Drzewiecki (Poland) Kacper Żuk
- Score: Walkover

Events
Singles	Doubles
- Teréga Open Pau–Pyrénées

Romain Arneodo and Tristan-Samuel Weissborn were the defending champions but only Arneodo chose to defend his title, partnering Andrei Vasilevski. Arneodo lost in the first round to Elliot Benchetrit and Eliakim Coulibaly.

Albano Olivetti and David Vega Hernández won the title after Karol Drzewiecki and Kacper Żuk withdrew from the final.

== Seeds ==
1. (United Kingdom) Jonny O'Mara / (Australia) Matt Reid (semifinals)
2. (Monaco) Romain Arneodo / (Belarus) Andrei Vasilevski (first round)
3. (Poland) Szymon Walków / (Poland) Jan Zieliński (quarterfinals)
4. (Czech Republic) Roman Jebavý / (Ukraine) Denys Molchanov (withdrew)

== Draw ==
Key

- Q = Qualifier
- WC = Wild card
- LL = Lucky loser
- Alt = Alternate
- ITF = ITF entry
- PR = Protected ranking
- SR = Special ranking
- SE = Special exempt
- JE = Junior exempt
- JR = Junior Accelerator Programme entrant
- CO = College Accelerator Programme entrant
- NG = Next Gen Accelerator Program entrant
- w/o = Walkover
- r = Retired
- d = Defaulted

First round
1	(United Kingdom) J O'Mara (Australia) M Reid	6	6^{3}	[10]
(Ecuador) D Hidalgo (Zimbabwe) B Lock	1	7^{7}	[7]
Alt	(France) A Müller (Croatia) N Serdarušić	4	2
(India) J Nedunchezhiyan (India) P Raja	6	6
3	(Poland) S Walków (Poland) J Zieliński	6	6
(France) M Guinard (United Kingdom) R Peniston	0	3
(Poland) K Drzewiecki (Poland) K Żuk	6	6
(Netherlands) M Hermans (Netherlands) G Smits	4	4
WC	(France) A Fils (France) H Mayot	2	1
(Belgium) R Bemelmans (Belgium) M Geerts	6	6
(France) A Olivetti (Spain) D Vega Hernández	6	2	[10]
Alt	(France) J Eysseric (France) Q Halys	4	6	[4]
(Spain) S Martos Gornés (New Zealand) A Sitak	6	4	[10]
Alt	(France) T Arribagé (France) A Reymond	4	6	[5]
WC	(Morocco) E Benchetrit (Ivory Coast) E Coulibaly	6	3	[10]
2	(Monaco) R Arneodo (Belarus) A Vasilevski	2	6	[7]

Quarterfinals
1	(United Kingdom) J O'Mara (Australia) M Reid	7	7^{7}
(India) J Nedunchezhiyan (India) P Raja	5	6^{2}
3	(Poland) S Walków (Poland) J Zieliński	4	7^{7}	[3]
(Poland) K Drzewiecki (Poland) K Żuk	6	6^{4}	[10]
(Belgium) R Bemelmans (Belgium) M Geerts	4	4
(France) A Olivetti (Spain) D Vega Hernández	6	6
(Spain) S Martos Gornés (New Zealand) A Sitak	6	7
WC	(Morocco) E Benchetrit (Ivory Coast) E Coulibaly	1	5

Semifinals
1	(United Kingdom) J O'Mara (Australia) M Reid	3	6	[6]
(Poland) K Drzewiecki (Poland) K Żuk	6	2	[10]
(France) A Olivetti (Spain) D Vega Hernández	6	7
(Spain) S Martos Gornés (New Zealand) A Sitak	2	5

Final
(Poland) K Drzewiecki (Poland) K Żuk
(France) A Olivetti (Spain) D Vega Hernández	w/o
