= 2026 Teréga Open Pau–Pyrénées – Singles =

Pyrénées – Singles
- 2026 Teréga Open Pau–Pyrénées

Final
- Champion: (Belgium) Raphaël Collignon
- Runner-up: (France) Benjamin Bonzi
- Score: 7–6^{(7–5)}, 6–1

Events
Singles	Doubles
- Teréga Open Pau–Pyrénées

Raphaël Collignon was the defending champion and successfully defended his title after defeating Benjamin Bonzi 7–6^{(7–5)}, 6–1 in the final.

== Seeds ==
1. (Belgium) Raphaël Collignon (champion)
2. (Kazakhstan) Alexander Shevchenko (quarterfinals)
3. (Belgium) Alexander Blockx (first round)
4. (Italy) Luca Nardi (second round)
5. (Belgium) David Goffin (first round)
6. (France) Luca Van Assche (quarterfinals)
7. (France) Benjamin Bonzi (final)
8. (Tunisia) Moez Echargui (quarterfinals)

== Draw ==
Key

- Q = Qualifier
- WC = Wild card
- LL = Lucky loser
- Alt = Alternate
- ITF = ITF entry
- PR = Protected ranking
- SR = Special ranking
- SE = Special exempt
- JE = Junior exempt
- JR = Junior Accelerator Programme entrant
- CO = College Accelerator Programme entrant
- NG = Next Gen Accelerator Program entrant
- w/o = Walkover
- r = Retired
- d = Defaulted

=== Finals ===
Semifinals
1	(Belgium) Raphaël Collignon	7	6
Q	(France) Clément Tabur	5	4
7	(France) Benjamin Bonzi	7^{8}	6
Q	(Germany) Henri Squire	6^{6}	4

Final
1	(Belgium) Raphaël Collignon	7^{7}	6
7	(France) Benjamin Bonzi	6^{5}	1

=== Top half ===
First round
1	(Belgium) R Collignon	7	6
Q	(Germany) P Zahraj	5	2
Q	(Switzerland) R Bertola	5	3
(United States) M Damm	7	6
Q	(Japan) J Trotter	6	6^{5}	4
(Czech Republic) Z Kolář	3	7^{7}	6
SE	P Kotov	3	0^{r}
6	(France) L Van Assche	6	3
3	(Belgium) A Blockx	1	4
Q	(France) C Tabur	6	6
(Spain) M Landaluce	6	2	7^{7}
SE	(Ukraine) O Prihodko	4	6	6^{4}
Alt	(France) D Added	2^{r}
(Slovakia) L Klein	5
(Germany) J Engel	6^{2}	4
8	(Tunisia) M Echargui	7^{7}	6

Second round
1	(Belgium) R Collignon	7^{7}	7^{7}
(United States) M Damm	6^{5}	6^{5}
(Czech Republic) Z Kolář	6	3	4
6	(France) L Van Assche	1	6	6
Q	(France) C Tabur	6	6
(Spain) M Landaluce	3	3
(Slovakia) L Klein	2	2
8	(Tunisia) M Echargui	6	6

Quarterfinals
1	(Belgium) R Collignon	6	6
6	(France) L Van Assche	2	4
Q	(France) C Tabur	6^{4}	6	6
8	(Tunisia) M Echargui	7^{7}	2	4

Semifinals
1	(Belgium) R Collignon	7	6
Q	(France) C Tabur	5	4

=== Bottom half ===
First round
7	(France) B Bonzi	5	7^{7}	7^{7}
LL	(Kazakhstan) M Kukushkin	7	6^{3}	6^{3}
(Switzerland) L Riedi	6^{0}	6	6
Q	(France) F Balshaw	7^{7}	3	2
WC	(France) A Bouquier	4	6	7^{7}
(Kazakhstan) T Skatov	6	4	6^{5}
(Switzerland) J Kym	4	6^{3}
4	(Italy) L Nardi	6	7^{7}
5/WC	(Belgium) D Goffin	6^{6}	7	1
(Italy) G Zeppieri	7^{8}	5	6
WC	(France) M Kouamé	3	5
Q	(Germany) H Squire	6	7
(Estonia) M Lajal	3	3^{r}
(Estonia) D Glinka	6	4
(France) C Chidekh	4	6^{6}
2	(Kazakhstan) A Shevchenko	6	7^{8}

Second round
7	(France) B Bonzi	6	7^{7}
(Switzerland) L Riedi	3	6^{4}
WC	(France) A Bouquier	6	4	7^{7}
4	(Italy) L Nardi	4	6	6^{5}
(Italy) G Zeppieri	6	3	3
Q	(Germany) H Squire	3	6	6
(Estonia) D Glinka	3	7^{9}	1
2	(Kazakhstan) A Shevchenko	6	6^{7}	6

Quarterfinals
7	(France) B Bonzi	6^{9}	6	6
WC	(France) A Bouquier	7^{11}	4	4
Q	(Germany) H Squire	6^{5}	7^{8}	7^{7}
2	(Kazakhstan) A Shevchenko	7^{7}	6^{6}	6^{4}

Semifinals
7	(France) B Bonzi	7^{8}	6
Q	(Germany) H Squire	6^{6}	4
