= 2019 Teréga Open Pau–Pyrénées – Doubles =

Pyrénées – Doubles
- 2019 Teréga Open Pau–Pyrénées

Final
- Champions: (United Kingdom) Scott Clayton (Canada) Adil Shamasdin
- Runners-up: (Netherlands) Sander Arends (Austria) Tristan-Samuel Weissborn
- Score: 7–6^{(7–4)}, 5–7, [10–8]

Events
Singles	Doubles
Teréga Open Pau–Pyrénées	· 2020 →

This was the first edition of the tournament.

Scott Clayton and Adil Shamasdin won the title after defeating Sander Arends and Tristan-Samuel Weissborn 7–6^{(7–4)}, 5–7, [10–8] in the final.

== Seeds ==
1. (France) Jonathan Eysseric / (Spain) David Vega Hernández (first round)
2. (Germany) Andre Begemann / (Australia) Rameez Junaid (quarterfinals)
3. (France) Fabrice Martin / (Belarus) Andrei Vasilevski (first round)
4. (Netherlands) Sander Arends / (Austria) Tristan-Samuel Weissborn (final)

== Draw ==
=== Key ===
- Q = Qualifier
- WC = Wild card
- LL = Lucky loser
- Alt = Alternate
- SE = Special exempt
- PR = Protected ranking
- ITF = ITF entry
- JE = Junior exempt
- w/o = Walkover
- r = Retired
- d = Defaulted
- SR = Special ranking

First round
1	(France) J Eysseric (Spain) D Vega Hernández	6^{5}	4
(France) B Bonzi (France) Q Halys	7^{7}	6
(Germany) D Brands (Germany) D Brown	1	6^{2}
WC	(France) A Musialek (France) Matthieu Perchicot	6	7^{7}
3	(France) F Martin (Belarus) A Vasilevski	6	6^{9}	[8]
(United Kingdom) S Clayton (Canada) A Shamasdin	3	7^{11}	[10]
ITF	(Guatemala) W González (France) Hugo Voljacques	4	0^{r}
(Switzerland) L Margaroli (Italy) A Vavassori	6	2
(Netherlands) D Pel (Croatia) A Šančić	6	4	[5]
(Spain) G Granollers (Austria) L Miedler	2	6	[10]
WC	(France) A Müller (Croatia) N Serdarušić	4	4
4	(Netherlands) S Arends (Austria) T-S Weissborn	6	6
(Sweden) A Siljeström (Poland) S Walków	7^{7}	6
ITF	(Germany) Peter Heller (Russia) R Safiullin	6^{3}	3
WC	(France) E Furness (France) G Jacq	6	6^{1}	[5]
2	(Germany) A Begemann (Australia) R Junaid	4	7^{7}	[10]

Quarterfinals
(France) B Bonzi (France) Q Halys	6^{5}	7	[6]
WC	(France) A Musialek (France) M Perchicot	7^{7}	5	[10]
(United Kingdom) S Clayton (Canada) A Shamasdin	6^{5}	6	[15]
(Switzerland) L Margaroli (Italy) A Vavassori	7^{7}	2	[13]
(Spain) G Granollers (Austria) L Miedler	6	3	[5]
4	(Netherlands) S Arends (Austria) T-S Weissborn	2	6	[10]
(Sweden) A Siljeström (Poland) S Walków	3	6	[10]
2	(Germany) A Begemann (Australia) R Junaid	6	3	[7]

Semifinals
WC	(France) A Musialek (France) M Perchicot	5	2
(United Kingdom) S Clayton (Canada) A Shamasdin	7	6
4	(Netherlands) S Arends (Austria) T-S Weissborn	6	6
(Sweden) A Siljeström (Poland) S Walków	3	3

Final
(United Kingdom) S Clayton (Canada) A Shamasdin	7^{7}	5	[10]
4	(Netherlands) S Arends (Austria) T-S Weissborn	6^{4}	7	[8]
