= 2026 Teréga Open Pau–Pyrénées – Doubles =

Pyrénées – Doubles
- 2026 Teréga Open Pau–Pyrénées

Final
- Champions: (India) Sriram Balaji (Austria) Neil Oberleitner
- Runners-up: (Switzerland) Jakub Paul (Czech Republic) Matěj Vocel
- Score: 1–6, 6–3, [13–11]

Events
Singles	Doubles
- Teréga Open Pau–Pyrénées

Jakob Schnaitter and Mark Wallner were the defending champions but chose not to defend their title.

Sriram Balaji and Neil Oberleitner won the title after defeating Jakub Paul and Matěj Vocel 1–6, 6–3, [13–11] in the final.

== Seeds ==
1. (India) Sriram Balaji / (Austria) Neil Oberleitner (champions)
2. (Switzerland) Jakub Paul / (Czech Republic) Matěj Vocel (final)
3. (India) Rithvik Choudary Bollipalli / (United States) Reese Stalder (first round)
4. (France) Arthur Reymond / (France) Luca Sanchez (quarterfinals)

== Draw ==
Key

- Q = Qualifier
- WC = Wild card
- LL = Lucky loser
- Alt = Alternate
- ITF = ITF entry
- PR = Protected ranking
- SR = Special ranking
- SE = Special exempt
- JE = Junior exempt
- JR = Junior Accelerator Programme entrant
- CO = College Accelerator Programme entrant
- NG = Next Gen Accelerator Program entrant
- w/o = Walkover
- r = Retired
- d = Defaulted

First round
1	(India) S Balaji (Austria) N Oberleitner	6	5	[10]
(Australia) P Harper (United States) B Kittay	3	7	[4]
(Czech Republic) Z Kolář (Croatia) N Serdarušić	4	5
WC	(France) C Chidekh (France) F Martin	6	7
3	(India) RC Bollipalli (United States) R Stalder	7	3	[8]
(India) A Chandrasekar (Israel) D Cukierman	5	6	[10]
(India) J Nedunchezhiyan (India) R Ramanathan	2	3
(United States) M Damm (Czech Republic) M Vrbenský	6	6
(India) A Kadhe (Poland) P Matuszewski	7^{7}	7^{12}
(Poland) K Drzewiecki (Poland) F Pieczonka	6^{3}	6^{10}
(Sweden) E Grevelius (Sweden) A Heinonen	3	4
4	(France) A Reymond (France) L Sanchez	6	6
(Spain) S Martos Gornés (India) VS Prashanth	w/o
WC	(France) D Added (France) A Bouquier
PR	(France) G Jacq (Tunisia) S Mansouri	2	4
2	(Switzerland) J Paul (Czech Republic) M Vocel	6	6

Quarterfinals
1	(India) S Balaji (Austria) N Oberleitner	6	7
WC	(France) C Chidekh (France) F Martin	1	5
(India) A Chandrasekar (Israel) D Cukierman	6^{5}	3
(United States) M Damm (Czech Republic) M Vrbenský	7^{7}	6
(India) A Kadhe (Poland) P Matuszewski	7^{7}	6
4	(France) A Reymond (France) L Sanchez	6^{5}	1
(Spain) S Martos Gornés (India) VS Prashanth	4	1
2	(Switzerland) J Paul (Czech Republic) M Vocel	6	6

Semifinals
1	(India) S Balaji (Austria) N Oberleitner	7	7^{7}
(United States) M Damm (Czech Republic) M Vrbenský	5	6^{1}
(India) A Kadhe (Poland) P Matuszewski	3	1
2	(Switzerland) J Paul (Czech Republic) M Vocel	6	6

Final
1	(India) S Balaji (Austria) N Oberleitner	1	6	[13]
2	(Switzerland) J Paul (Czech Republic) M Vocel	6	3	[11]
