= 2019 Teréga Open Pau–Pyrénées – Singles =

Pyrénées – Singles
- 2019 Teréga Open Pau–Pyrénées

Final
- Champion: (Kazakhstan) Alexander Bublik
- Runner-up: (Slovakia) Norbert Gombos
- Score: 5–7, 6–3, 6–3

Events
Singles	Doubles
Teréga Open Pau–Pyrénées	· 2020 →

This was the first edition of the tournament.

Alexander Bublik won the title after defeating Norbert Gombos 5–7, 6–3, 6–3 in the final.

== Seeds ==
All seeds receive a bye into the second round.

1. (France) Grégoire Barrère (semifinals)
2. (Italy) Simone Bolelli (second round)
3. (Ukraine) Sergiy Stakhovsky (second round)
4. (Kazakhstan) Alexander Bublik (champion)
5. (France) Quentin Halys (quarterfinals)
6. (Germany) Daniel Brands (second round)
7. (Austria) Sebastian Ofner (quarterfinals)
8. (Italy) Lorenzo Giustino (second round)
9. (Slovakia) Filip Horanský (second round)
10. (Italy) Stefano Napolitano (second round)
11. (United Kingdom) Jay Clarke (second round, retired)
12. (Germany) Tobias Kamke (third round)
13. (Sweden) Mikael Ymer (third round)
14. (Belgium) Arthur De Greef (second round)
15. (Czech Republic) Adam Pavlásek (second round)
16. (Netherlands) Tallon Griekspoor (second round)

== Draw ==
=== Key ===
- Q = Qualifier
- WC = Wild card
- LL = Lucky loser
- Alt = Alternate
- SE = Special exempt
- PR = Protected ranking
- ITF = ITF entry
- JE = Junior exempt
- w/o = Walkover
- r = Retired
- d = Defaulted
- SR = Special ranking

=== Finals ===
Quarterfinals
1	(France) Grégoire Barrère	6	6
ITF	(Russia) Roman Safiullin	1	2
4	(Kazakhstan) Alexander Bublik	6	7
(France) Maxime Janvier	1	5
7	(Austria) Sebastian Ofner	3	6^{5}
(Slovakia) Norbert Gombos	6	7^{7}
5	(France) Quentin Halys	4	4
Q	(Belgium) Steve Darcis	6	6

Semifinals
1	(France) Grégoire Barrère	6^{6}	5
4	(Kazakhstan) Alexander Bublik	7^{8}	7
(Slovakia) Norbert Gombos	6	2
Q	(Belgium) Steve Darcis	4	0^{r}

Final
4	(Kazakhstan) Alexander Bublik	5	6	6
(Slovakia) Norbert Gombos	7	3	3

=== Top half ===
==== Section 1 ====
First round
(Italy) M Viola	3	4
(Croatia) N Serdarušić	6	6
(Denmark) M Torpegaard	6	6
(Spain) M Vilella Martínez	3	3
ITF	(Russia) R Safiullin	3	7^{7}	6
(Germany) D Brown	6	6^{4}	2
ITF	(Italy) R Brancaccio	3	6	1
(Spain) N Kuhn	6	4	6

Second round
1	(France) G Barrère	7	4	6
(Croatia) N Serdarušić	5	6	3
(Denmark) M Torpegaard	6	2	4
13	(Sweden) M Ymer	1	6	6
9	(Slovakia) F Horanský	6^{5}	6^{3}
ITF	(Russia) R Safiullin	7^{7}	7^{7}
(Spain) N Kuhn	6	7^{7}
6	(Germany) D Brands	1	6^{5}

Third round
1	(France) G Barrère	6	6
13	(Sweden) M Ymer	3	3
ITF	(Russia) R Safiullin	6	6
(Spain) N Kuhn	3	4

Quarterfinals
1	(France) G Barrère	6	6
ITF	(Russia) R Safiullin	1	2

==== Section 2 ====
First round
ITF	(Spain) J Barranco Cosano	6	2	6
(France) E Benchetrit	1	6	3
(United Kingdom) J Choinski	7	2	6
(Spain) S Gutiérrez Ferrol	5	6	3
(Russia) E Karlovskiy	6^{2}	4
(France) M Janvier	7^{7}	6
(Austria) L Miedler	6	6
(Turkey) C İlkel	4	3

Second round
4	(Kazakhstan) A Bublik	6	6
ITF	(Spain) J Barranco Cosano	4	4
(United Kingdom) J Choinski	6	7
15	(Czech Republic) A Pavlásek	4	5
11	(United Kingdom) J Clarke	2	0^{r}
(France) M Janvier	6	2
(Austria) L Miedler	4	7^{10}	6
8	(Italy) L Giustino	6	6^{8}	4

Third round
4	(Kazakhstan) A Bublik	6	6
(United Kingdom) J Choinski	4	2
(France) M Janvier	7^{7}	6
(Austria) L Miedler	6^{2}	4

Quarterfinals
4	(Kazakhstan) A Bublik	6	7
(France) M Janvier	1	5

=== Bottom half ===
==== Section 3 ====
First round
Alt	(Spain) C Taberner	4	6	3
Alt	(Lithuania) L Grigelis	6	4	6
WC	(France) E Furness	2	5
WC	(France) T Lamasine	6	7
Q	(France) G Jacq	4	4
(Czech Republic) Z Kolář	6	6
(Slovakia) N Gombos	6	6
WC	(France) Lény Mitjana	4	1

Second round
7	(Austria) S Ofner	7^{7}	6
Alt	(Lithuania) L Grigelis	6^{5}	4
WC	(France) T Lamasine	6	7
10	(Italy) S Napolitano	1	5
16	(Netherlands) T Griekspoor	7^{7}	5	3
(Czech Republic) Z Kolář	6^{2}	7	6
(Slovakia) N Gombos	7^{7}	4	6
3	(Ukraine) S Stakhovsky	6^{4}	6	1

Third round
7	(Austria) S Ofner	6^{4}	6	7
WC	(France) T Lamasine	7^{7}	3	5
(Czech Republic) Z Kolář	7^{7}	6^{4}	3
(Slovakia) N Gombos	6^{5}	7^{7}	6

Quarterfinals
7	(Austria) S Ofner	3	6^{5}
(Slovakia) N Gombos	6	7^{7}

==== Section 4 ====
First round
(France) B Bonzi	3	5
Alt	(Italy) A Vavassori	6	7
(Spain) B Zapata Miralles	6	6
ITF	(Germany) Peter Heller	3	3
Q	(Belgium) S Darcis	6	7^{7}
WC	(France) A Müller	1	6^{3}
WC	(France) M Bourgue	6	6
(Germany) D Masur	1	3

Second round
5	(France) Q Halys	6	6
Alt	(Italy) A Vavassori	3	2
(Spain) B Zapata Miralles	2	3
12	(Germany) T Kamke	6	6
14	(Belgium) A De Greef	6^{5}	5
Q	(Belgium) S Darcis	7^{7}	7
WC	(France) M Bourgue	7	7^{7}
2	(Italy) S Bolelli	5	6^{5}

Third round
5	(France) Q Halys	7^{7}	7^{7}
12	(Germany) T Kamke	6^{5}	6^{3}
Q	(Belgium) S Darcis	3	7	7^{7}
WC	(France) M Bourgue	6	5	6^{5}

Quarterfinals
5	(France) Q Halys	4	4
Q	(Belgium) S Darcis	6	6
