= 2025 Teréga Open Pau–Pyrénées – Singles =

Pyrénées – Singles
- 2025 Teréga Open Pau–Pyrénées

Final
- Champion: (Belgium) Raphaël Collignon
- Runner-up: (Germany) Patrick Zahraj
- Score: 6–2, 6–4

Events
| Singles | Doubles |
- Teréga Open Pau–Pyrénées

Otto Virtanen was the defending champion but chose not to defend his title.

Raphaël Collignon won the title after defeating Patrick Zahraj 6–2, 6–4 in the final.

== Seeds ==
1. (United Kingdom) Jacob Fearnley (quarterfinals)
2. (Belgium) Raphaël Collignon (champion)
3. (France) Richard Gasquet (second round, withdrew)
4. (Spain) Martín Landaluce (first round)
5. (France) Harold Mayot (second round)
6. (France) Grégoire Barrère (first round)
7. (Belgium) Alexander Blockx (second round)
8. (Slovakia) Lukáš Klein (semifinals)

== Draw ==
Key

- Q = Qualifier
- WC = Wild card
- LL = Lucky loser
- Alt = Alternate
- ITF = ITF entry
- PR = Protected ranking
- SR = Special ranking
- SE = Special exempt
- JE = Junior exempt
- JR = Junior Accelerator Programme entrant
- CO = College Accelerator Programme entrant
- NG = Next Gen Accelerator Program entrant
- w/o = Walkover
- r = Retired
- d = Defaulted

=== Finals ===
Semifinals
8 | (Slovakia) Lukáš Klein | 3 | 4
Q | (Germany) Patrick Zahraj | 6 | 6
WC | (France) Arthur Bouquier | 4 | 6^{5}
2 | (Belgium) Raphaël Collignon | 6 | 7^{7}

Final
Q | (Germany) Patrick Zahraj | 2 | 4
2 | (Belgium) Raphaël Collignon | 6 | 6

=== Top half ===
First round
1 | (United Kingdom) J Fearnley | 6 | 6
Q | (Slovakia) L Pokorný | 4 | 4
LL | (France) M Janvier | 4 | 7^{8} | 4
Q | E Karlovskiy | 6 | 6^{6} | 6
Q | (France) L Poullain | 5 | 6 | 6
(Lithuania) V Gaubas | 7 | 2 | 0
(France) A Escoffier | 3 | 4
8 | (Slovakia) L Klein | 6 | 6
3 | (France) R Gasquet | 6 | 7^{7}
Alt | (United Kingdom) C Broom | 3 | 6^{4}
(China) F Sun | 1 | 6 | 3
WC | (United Kingdom) A Fery | 6 | 1 | 6
A Kachmazov | 3 | 1
Q | (Germany) P Zahraj | 6 | 6
(China) J Cui | 2 | 2
5 | (France) H Mayot | 6 | 6

Second round
1 | (United Kingdom) J Fearnley | 6 | 6
Q | E Karlovskiy | 4 | 2
Q | (France) L Poullain | 3 | 5
8 | (Slovakia) L Klein | 6 | 7
3 | (France) R Gasquet
WC | (United Kingdom) A Fery | w/o
Q | (Germany) P Zahraj | 6 | 6
5 | (France) H Mayot | 2 | 4

Quarterfinals
1 | (United Kingdom) J Fearnley | 3 | 3
8 | (Slovakia) L Klein | 6 | 6
WC | (United Kingdom) A Fery | 3 | 6 | 3
Q | (Germany) P Zahraj | 6 | 3 | 6

Semifinals
8 | (Slovakia) L Klein | 3 | 4
Q | (Germany) P Zahraj | 6 | 6

=== Bottom half ===
First round
7 | (Belgium) A Blockx | 2
(France) M Guinard | 3^{r}
(France) L Van Assche | 6 | 0 | 2
(United States) M Cassone | 2 | 6 | 6
(France) R Bertrand | 6 | 6
Q | (France) Pierre Delage | 4 | 2
WC | (France) A Bouquier | 6^{3} | 6 | 7
4 | (Spain) M Landaluce | 7^{7} | 3 | 5
6 | (France) G Barrère | 5 | 3
LL | (Argentina) P Cachin | 7 | 6
(Lithuania) E Butvilas | 6 | 5 | 3
SE | (Austria) F Misolic | 4 | 7 | 6
(France) P-H Herbert | 4 | 6^{5}
LL | A Vatutin | 6 | 7^{7}
Q | (France) Maxence Beaugé | 6^{3} | 6 | 3
2 | (Belgium) R Collignon | 7^{7} | 4 | 6

Second round
7 | (Belgium) A Blockx | 2 | 2
(United States) M Cassone | 6 | 6
(France) R Bertrand | 7 | 6^{3} | 6^{8}
WC | (France) A Bouquier | 5 | 7^{7} | 7^{10}
LL | (Argentina) P Cachin | 4 | 6 | 2
SE | (Austria) F Misolic | 6 | 3 | 6
LL | A Vatutin | 0 | 1
2 | (Belgium) R Collignon | 6 | 6

Quarterfinals
(United States) M Cassone | 6 | 6^{9} | 2
WC | (France) A Bouquier | 4 | 7^{11} | 6
SE | (Austria) F Misolic | 4 | 3
2 | (Belgium) R Collignon | 6 | 6

Semifinals
WC | (France) A Bouquier | 4 | 6^{5}
2 | (Belgium) R Collignon | 6 | 7^{7}
