= 2019 Teréga Open Pau–Pyrénées =

- Date: 25 February – 3 March
- Edition: 1st
- Draw: 48S / 4Q / 16D
- Surface: Hard (indoor)
- Location: Pau, France

Champions

Singles
- (Kazakhstan) Alexander Bublik

Doubles
- (United Kingdom) Scott Clayton / (Canada) Adil Shamasdin
Teréga Open Pau–Pyrénées	· 2020 →

The 2019 Teréga Open Pau–Pyrénées was a professional tennis tournament played on indoor hardcourts. It was the first edition of the tournament which was part of the 2019 ATP Challenger Tour. It took place in Pau, France between 25 February and 3 March 2019.

== Singles main-draw entrants ==
=== Seeds ===
Country	Player	Rank^{1}	Seed
FRA	Grégoire Barrère	130	1
ITA	Simone Bolelli	136	2
UKR	Sergiy Stakhovsky	141	3
KAZ	Alexander Bublik	149	4
FRA	Quentin Halys	165	5
GER	Daniel Brands	170	6
AUT	Sebastian Ofner	175	7
ITA	Lorenzo Giustino	185	8
SVK	Filip Horanský	190	9
ITA	Stefano Napolitano	196	10
GBR	Jay Clarke	197	11
GER	Tobias Kamke	205	12
SWE	Mikael Ymer	206	13
BEL	Arthur De Greef	209	14
CZE	Adam Pavlásek	214	15
NED	Tallon Griekspoor	215	16

- ^{1} Rankings are as of 18 February 2019.

=== Other entrants ===
The following players received wildcards into the singles main draw:

- (France) Mathias Bourgue
- (France) Evan Furness
- (France) Tristan Lamasine
- (France) Lény Mitjana
- (France) Alexandre Müller

The following players received entry into the singles main draw as alternates:

- (Lithuania) Laurynas Grigelis
- (Spain) Carlos Taberner
- (Italy) Andrea Vavassori

The following players received entry into the singles main draw using their ITF World Tennis Ranking:

- (Spain) Javier Barranco Cosano
- (Italy) Raúl Brancaccio
- (Germany) Peter Heller
- (Russia) Roman Safiullin

The following players received entry from the qualifying draw:

- (Belgium) Steve Darcis
- (France) Grégoire Jacq

== Champions ==
=== Singles ===
- (Kazakhstan) Alexander Bublik def. (Slovakia) Norbert Gombos 5–7, 6–3, 6–3.

=== Doubles ===
- (United Kingdom) Scott Clayton / (Canada) Adil Shamasdin def. (Netherlands) Sander Arends / (Austria) Tristan-Samuel Weissborn 7–6^{(7–4)}, 5–7, [10–8].
