= 2025 Teréga Open Pau–Pyrénées – Doubles =

Pyrénées – Doubles
- 2025 Teréga Open Pau–Pyrénées

Final
- Champions: (Germany) Jakob Schnaitter (Germany) Mark Wallner
- Runners-up: (Belgium) Alexander Blockx (Belgium) Raphaël Collignon
- Score: 6–4, 6–7^{(5–7)}, [10–8]

Events
Singles	Doubles
- Teréga Open Pau–Pyrénées

Christian Harrison and Brandon Nakashima were the defending champions but chose not to defend their title.

Jakob Schnaitter and Mark Wallner won the title after defeating Alexander Blockx and Raphaël Collignon 6–4, 6–7^{(5–7)}, [10–8] in the final.

== Seeds ==
1. (Germany) Jakob Schnaitter / (Germany) Mark Wallner (champions)
2. (United States) Reese Stalder / (Netherlands) Mick Veldheer (semifinals)
3. (Italy) Marco Bortolotti / (Spain) Sergio Martos Gornés (quarterfinals)
4. (Canada) Cleeve Harper / (United Kingdom) David Stevenson (semifinals)

== Draw ==
Key

- Q = Qualifier
- WC = Wild card
- LL = Lucky loser
- Alt = Alternate
- ITF = ITF entry
- PR = Protected ranking
- SR = Special ranking
- SE = Special exempt
- JE = Junior exempt
- JR = Junior Accelerator Programme entrant
- CO = College Accelerator Programme entrant
- NG = Next Gen Accelerator Program entrant
- w/o = Walkover
- r = Retired
- d = Defaulted

=== Draw ===
First round
1	(Germany) J Schnaitter (Germany) M Wallner	6	6
(France) R Bertrand (France) A Escoffier	3	2
WC	(France) Louis Dussin (France) A Reymond	4	6	[7]
(Romania) A Jecan (Italy) G Ricca	6	3	[10]
4	(Canada) C Harper (United Kingdom) D Stevenson	7^{7}	6
(United Kingdom) C Broom (United Kingdom) M Whitehouse	6^{2}	4
(Czech Republic) Jiří Barnat (Czech Republic) F Duda	7^{7}	6
(Netherlands) Ryan Nijboer (China) F Sun	6^{5}	2
(Japan) K Uesugi (Spain) D Vega Hernández	1	4
(Belgium) A Blockx (Belgium) R Collignon	6	6
(Ukraine) D Molchanov (Slovakia) L Pokorný	4	3
3	(Italy) M Bortolotti (Spain) S Martos Gornés	6	6
(France) J Eysseric (France) P-H Herbert	7^{7}	6
Alt	(Uzbekistan) D Istomin; E Karlovskiy	6^{1}	3
WC	(France) M Janvier; A Vatutin	3	3
2	(United States) R Stalder (Netherlands) M Veldheer	6	6

Quarterfinals
1	(Germany) J Schnaitter (Germany) M Wallner	6^{4}	7	[10]
(Romania) A Jecan (Italy) G Ricca	7^{7}	5	[8]
4	(Canada) C Harper (United Kingdom) D Stevenson	6	6
(Czech Republic) J Barnat (Czech Republic) F Duda	4	0
(Belgium) A Blockx (Belgium) R Collignon	6	6
3	(Italy) M Bortolotti (Spain) S Martos Gornés	3	3
(France) J Eysseric (France) P-H Herbert	6	2	[8]
2	(United States) R Stalder (Netherlands) M Veldheer	2	6	[10]

Semifinals
1	(Germany) J Schnaitter (Germany) M Wallner	4	6	[10]
4	(Canada) C Harper (United Kingdom) D Stevenson	6	3	[5]
(Belgium) A Blockx (Belgium) R Collignon	6	6
2	(United States) R Stalder (Netherlands) M Veldheer	3	4

Final
1	(Germany) J Schnaitter (Germany) M Wallner	6	6^{5}	[10]
(Belgium) A Blockx (Belgium) R Collignon	4	7^{7}	[8]
