= 2026 BNP Paribas Primrose Bordeaux – Singles =

Singles
- 2026 BNP Paribas Primrose Bordeaux

Final
- Champion: (Argentina) Juan Manuel Cerúndolo
- Runner-up: (Belgium) Raphaël Collignon
- Score: 5–7, 6–1, 7–6^{(7–4)}

Events
Singles	Doubles
- BNP Paribas Primrose Bordeaux

Giovanni Mpetshi Perricard was the defending champion but lost in the quarterfinals to Quentin Halys.

Juan Manuel Cerúndolo won the title after defeating Raphaël Collignon 5–7, 6–1, 7–6^{(7–4)} in the final.

== Seeds ==
The top four seeds received a bye into the second round.

1. (France) Arthur Rinderknech (second round)
2. (Netherlands) Tallon Griekspoor (semifinals)
3. (France) Térence Atmane (second round)
4. (Netherlands) Botic van de Zandschulp (second round, retired)
5. (Argentina) Román Andrés Burruchaga (second round)
6. (France) Giovanni Mpetshi Perricard (quarterfinals)
7. (United States) Jenson Brooksby (first round)
8. (Belgium) Raphaël Collignon (final)

== Draw ==
Key

- Q = Qualifier
- WC = Wild card
- LL = Lucky loser
- Alt = Alternate
- ITF = ITF entry
- PR = Protected ranking
- SR = Special ranking
- SE = Special exempt
- JE = Junior exempt
- JR = Junior Accelerator Programme entrant
- CO = College Accelerator Programme entrant
- NG = Next Gen Accelerator Program entrant
- w/o = Walkover
- r = Retired
- d = Defaulted

=== Finals ===
Semifinals
(Argentina) Juan Manuel Cerúndolo	6	6
(France) Quentin Halys	2	4
8	(Belgium) Raphaël Collignon	7	6
2	(Netherlands) Tallon Griekspoor	5	1

Final
(Argentina) Juan Manuel Cerúndolo	5	6	7^{7}
8	(Belgium) Raphaël Collignon	7	1	6^{4}

=== Top half ===
First round
Q	(United States) M Damm	7^{7}	7^{9}
WC	(Bulgaria) G Dimitrov	6^{3}	6^{7}
(France) L Van Assche	6^{2}	4
(Argentina) JM Cerúndolo	7^{7}	6
Q	(France) Pierre Delage	3	6	4
5	(Argentina) RA Burruchaga	6	4	6
(Japan) S Shimabukuro	4	2
(France) Q Halys	6	6
(Australia) R Hijikata	1	7^{7}	3
(Australia) A Vukic	6	6^{3}	6
Alt	(Finland) O Virtanen	6	5	4
6	(France) G Mpetshi Perricard	2	7	6

Second round
1/WC	(France) A Rinderknech	4	6^{13}
Q	(United States) M Damm	6	7^{15}
(Argentina) JM Cerúndolo	6	6
5	(Argentina) RA Burruchaga	4	4
4	(Netherlands) B van de Zandschulp	1	0^{r}
(France) Q Halys	6	2
(Australia) A Vukic	0	3
6	(France) G Mpetshi Perricard	6	6

Quarterfinals
Q	(United States) M Damm	2	2
(Argentina) JM Cerúndolo	6	6
(France) Q Halys	6	7^{7}
6	(France) G Mpetshi Perricard	3	6^{3}

Semifinals
(Argentina) JM Cerúndolo	6	6
(France) Q Halys	2	4

=== Bottom half ===
First round
8	(Belgium) R Collignon	6	6
Q	(France) G Blancaneaux	2	1
(Kazakhstan) A Shevchenko	6	3	6
Alt	(France) H Gaston	1	6	1
(France) T Droguet	6	6^{2}	6
(United Kingdom) J Fearnley	2	7^{7}	2
7	(United States) J Brooksby	2	5
(Slovakia) A Molčan	6	7
Q	(Japan) R Sakamoto	6	3	6
(France) A Müller	4	6	3
WC	(France) M Kouamé	6	4	0
(France) B Bonzi	2	6	6

Second round
8	(Belgium) R Collignon	7^{7}	4
(Kazakhstan) A Shevchenko	6^{5}	0^{r}
(France) T Droguet	6^{13}	6	6
3	(France) T Atmane	7^{15}	1	4
(Slovakia) A Molčan	6	6
Q	(Japan) R Sakamoto	4	0
(France) B Bonzi	4	3
2	(Netherlands) T Griekspoor	6	6

Quarterfinals
8	(Belgium) R Collignon	6	7^{8}
(France) T Droguet	2	6^{6}
(Slovakia) A Molčan	2	4
2	(Netherlands) T Griekspoor	6	6

Semifinals
8	(Belgium) R Collignon	7	6
2	(Netherlands) T Griekspoor	5	1
