= 2021 Teréga Open Pau–Pyrénées – Doubles =

Pyrénées – Doubles
- 2021 Teréga Open Pau–Pyrénées

Final
- Champions: (Monaco) Romain Arneodo (Austria) Tristan-Samuel Weissborn
- Runners-up: (Pakistan) Aisam-ul-Haq Qureshi (Spain) David Vega Hernández
- Score: 6–4, 6–2

Events
Singles	Doubles
- Teréga Open Pau–Pyrénées

Benjamin Bonzi and Antoine Hoang were the defending champions but chose not to defend their title.

Romain Arneodo and Tristan-Samuel Weissborn won the title after defeating Aisam-ul-Haq Qureshi and David Vega Hernández 6–4, 6–2 in the final.

== Seeds ==
1. (Pakistan) Aisam-ul-Haq Qureshi / (Spain) David Vega Hernández (final)
2. (Sweden) André Göransson / (Netherlands) David Pel (semifinals)
3. (Monaco) Romain Arneodo / (Austria) Tristan-Samuel Weissborn (champions)
4. (Ukraine) Denys Molchanov / (Ukraine) Sergiy Stakhovsky (semifinals)

== Draw ==
Key

- Q = Qualifier
- WC = Wild card
- LL = Lucky loser
- Alt = Alternate
- ITF = ITF entry
- PR = Protected ranking
- SR = Special ranking
- SE = Special exempt
- JE = Junior exempt
- JR = Junior Accelerator Programme entrant
- CO = College Accelerator Programme entrant
- NG = Next Gen Accelerator Program entrant
- w/o = Walkover
- r = Retired
- d = Defaulted

First round
WC	(France) Valentin Lapalu (France) H Mayot	6	6
(Russia) P Kotov (Chinese Taipei) C-h Tseng	4	4
4	(Ukraine) D Molchanov (Ukraine) S Stakhovsky	7	6
(Italy) M Bortolotti (Zimbabwe) B Lock	5	0
(Ukraine) G Kravchenko (Spain) N Sánchez Izquierdo	7	6
(Canada) S Diez (Italy) A Giannessi	5	2
(Belgium) M Geerts (France) M Janvier	7^{7}	6
(France) G Blancaneaux (New Zealand) A Sitak	6^{4}	3
(Poland) K Drzewiecki (Poland) P Matuszewski	2	6^{5}
3	(Monaco) R Arneodo (Austria) T-S Weissborn	6	7^{7}
(France) D Added (Ukraine) V Sachko	6	6
(United States) J Cerretani (United Kingdom) E Hoyt	3	4
(Germany) H Jebens (Germany) Niklas Schell	6^{2}	7^{7}	[5]
2	(Sweden) A Göransson (Netherlands) D Pel	7^{7}	6^{2}	[10]

Quarterfinals
1	(Pakistan) A-u-H Qureshi (Spain) D Vega Hernández	6	6
WC	(France) V Lapalu (France) H Mayot	1	4
4	(Ukraine) D Molchanov (Ukraine) S Stakhovsky	w/o
(Ukraine) G Kravchenko (Spain) N Sánchez Izquierdo
(Belgium) M Geerts (France) M Janvier	3	3
3	(Monaco) R Arneodo (Austria) T-S Weissborn	6	6
(France) D Added (Ukraine) V Sachko	2	2
2	(Sweden) A Göransson (Netherlands) D Pel	6	6

Semifinals
1	(Pakistan) A-u-H Qureshi (Spain) D Vega Hernández	6	3	[10]
4	(Ukraine) D Molchanov (Ukraine) S Stakhovsky	3	6	[2]
3	(Monaco) R Arneodo (Austria) T-S Weissborn	6	7^{7}
2	(Sweden) A Göransson (Netherlands) D Pel	4	6^{4}

Final
1	(Pakistan) A-u-H Qureshi (Spain) D Vega Hernández	4	2
3	(Monaco) R Arneodo (Austria) T-S Weissborn	6	6
