= 2026 BNP Paribas Primrose Bordeaux – Doubles =

Doubles
- 2026 BNP Paribas Primrose Bordeaux

Final
- Champions: (Czech Republic) Petr Nouza (Austria) Neil Oberleitner
- Runners-up: (France) Arthur Reymond (France) Luca Sanchez
- Score: 7–6^{(7–3)}, 6–7^{(3–7)}, [10–6]

Events
Singles	Doubles
- BNP Paribas Primrose Bordeaux

Francisco Cabral and Lucas Miedler were the defending champions but chose not to defend their title.

Petr Nouza and Neil Oberleitner won the title after defeating Arthur Reymond and Luca Sanchez 7–6^{(7–3)}, 6–7^{(3–7)}, [10–6] in the final.

== Seeds ==
1. (Argentina) Guido Andreozzi / (Argentina) Máximo González (first round)
2. (France) Théo Arribagé / (Australia) John Peers (semifinals)
3. (Monaco) Romain Arneodo / (Australia) Marc Polmans (quarterfinals)
4. (Czech Republic) Petr Nouza / (Austria) Neil Oberleitner (champions)

== Draw ==
Key

- Q = Qualifier
- WC = Wild card
- LL = Lucky loser
- Alt = Alternate
- ITF = ITF entry
- PR = Protected ranking
- SR = Special ranking
- SE = Special exempt
- JE = Junior exempt
- JR = Junior Accelerator Programme entrant
- CO = College Accelerator Programme entrant
- NG = Next Gen Accelerator Program entrant
- w/o = Walkover
- r = Retired
- d = Defaulted

First round
1	(Argentina) G Andreozzi (Argentina) M González	6^{4}	3
(France) Q Halys (France) P-H Herbert	7^{7}	6
(Israel) D Cukierman (United States) T Hilderbrand	6	6
WC	(France) Arthur Lenglet (France) Charles Pilet	4	1
3	(Monaco) R Arneodo (Australia) M Polmans	6	7^{7}
(France) G Blancaneaux (France) C Tabur	4	6^{4}
(France) A Reymond (France) L Sanchez	6	7^{7}
(Poland) K Drzewiecki (Poland) P Matuszewski	3	6^{3}
(France) H Grenier (France) F Martin	3	4
(France) B Bonzi (France) G Jacq	6	6
WC	(France) Pierre Delage (France) Louis Dussin	2	2
4	(Czech Republic) P Nouza (Austria) N Oberleitner	6	6
(Chinese Taipei) R Ho (Germany) H Jebens	3	6^{8}
(Mexico) M Reyes-Varela (United Kingdom) M Willis	6	7^{10}
(Belgium) S Gillé (Netherlands) S Verbeek	6	4	[7]
2	(France) T Arribagé (Australia) J Peers	4	6	[10]

Quarterfinals
(France) Q Halys (France) P-H Herbert	7	6
(Israel) D Cukierman (United States) T Hilderbrand	5	2
3	(Monaco) R Arneodo (Australia) M Polmans	4	2
(France) A Reymond (France) L Sanchez	6	6
(France) B Bonzi (France) G Jacq
4	(Czech Republic) P Nouza (Austria) N Oberleitner	w/o
(Mexico) M Reyes-Varela (United Kingdom) M Willis	6^{2}	2
2	(France) T Arribagé (Australia) J Peers	7^{7}	6

Semifinals
(France) Q Halys (France) P-H Herbert	6^{6}	6^{2}
(France) A Reymond (France) L Sanchez	7^{8}	7^{7}
4	(Czech Republic) P Nouza (Austria) N Oberleitner	6	6
2	(France) T Arribagé (Australia) J Peers	4	3

Final
(France) A Reymond (France) L Sanchez	6^{3}	7^{7}	[6]
4	(Czech Republic) P Nouza (Austria) N Oberleitner	7^{7}	6^{3}	[10]
