= 2026 BNP Paribas Primrose Bordeaux =

- Date: 12 – 17 May
- Edition: 17th
- Surface: Clay
- Location: Bordeaux, France

Champions

Singles
- (Argentina) Juan Manuel Cerúndolo

Doubles
- (Czech Republic) Petr Nouza / (Austria) Neil Oberleitner
- BNP Paribas Primrose Bordeaux

The 2026 BNP Paribas Primrose Bordeaux was a professional tennis tournament played on clay courts. It was the 17th edition of the tournament and an ATP Challenger Tour 175 event on the 2026 ATP Challenger Tour. It took place in Bordeaux, France between 12 and 17 May 2026.

== Singles main-draw entrants ==
=== Seeds ===
| Country | Player | Rank^{1} | Seed |
|---|---|---|---|
| FRA | Arthur Rinderknech | 24 | 1 |
| NED | Tallon Griekspoor | 31 | 2 |
| FRA | Térence Atmane | 51 | 3 |
| NED | Botic van de Zandschulp | 54 | 4 |
| ARG | Román Andrés Burruchaga | 56 | 5 |
| FRA | Giovanni Mpetshi Perricard | 58 | 6 |
| USA | Jenson Brooksby | 63 | 7 |
| BEL | Raphaël Collignon | 68 | 8 |

- ^{1} Rankings are as of 4 May 2026.

=== Other entrants ===
The following players received wildcards into the singles main draw:

- (Bulgaria) Grigor Dimitrov
- (France) Moïse Kouamé
- (France) Arthur Rinderknech

The following players received entry into the singles main draw as alternates:

- (France) Hugo Gaston
- (Finland) Otto Virtanen

The following players received entry from the qualifying draw:

- (France) Geoffrey Blancaneaux
- (United States) Martin Damm
- (France) Pierre Delage
- (Japan) Rei Sakamoto

== Champions ==
=== Singles ===
- (Argentina) Juan Manuel Cerúndolo def. (Belgium) Raphaël Collignon 5–7, 6–1, 7–6^{(7–4)}.

=== Doubles ===
- (Czech Republic) Petr Nouza / (Austria) Neil Oberleitner def. (France) Arthur Reymond / (France) Luca Sanchez 7–6^{(7–3)}, 6–7^{(3–7)}, [10–6].
