= 2024 Teréga Open Pau–Pyrénées =

- Date: 19 – 25 February
- Edition: 6th
- Surface: Hard (indoor)
- Location: Pau, France

Champions

Singles
- (Finland) Otto Virtanen

Doubles
- (United States) Christian Harrison / (United States) Brandon Nakashima
| ← 2023 · | Teréga Open Pau–Pyrénées | · 2025 → |

The 2024 Teréga Open Pau–Pyrénées was a professional tennis tournament played on indoor hardcourts. It was the sixth edition of the tournament which was part of the 2024 ATP Challenger Tour. It took place in Pau, France between 19 and 25 February 2024.

== Singles main-draw entrants ==
=== Seeds ===
| Country | Player | Rank^{1} | Seed |
|---|---|---|---|
| AUT | Jurij Rodionov | 88 | 1 |
| FRA | Arthur Rinderknech | 89 | 2 |
| USA | Brandon Nakashima | 92 | 3 |
| FRA | Grégoire Barrère | 110 | 4 |
| FRA | Quentin Halys | 111 | 5 |
| FRA | Benoît Paire | 112 | 6 |
| FRA | Harold Mayot | 131 | 7 |
| BEL | David Goffin | 133 | 8 |

- ^{1} Rankings are as of 12 February 2024.

=== Other entrants ===
The following players received wildcards into the singles main draw:

- (France) Charlie Camus
- (United Kingdom) Kyle Edmund
- (France) Lucas Pouille

The following players received entry into the singles main draw as special exempts:

- (France) Clément Chidekh
- (France) Matteo Martineau

The following players received entry from the qualifying draw:

- (Turkey) Altuğ Çelikbilek
- Egor Gerasimov
- (United States) Strong Kirchheimer
- (France) Tristan Lamasine
- (Syria) Hazem Naw
- (Japan) James Trotter

== Champions ==
=== Singles ===
- (Finland) Otto Virtanen def. (Switzerland) Leandro Riedi 7–5, 7–5.

=== Doubles ===
- (United States) Christian Harrison / (United States) Brandon Nakashima def. (Monaco) Romain Arneodo / (Austria) Sam Weissborn 7–6^{(7–5)}, 6–4.
