= 2020 Teréga Open Pau–Pyrénées =

- Date: 24 February – 1 March
- Edition: 2nd
- Draw: 48S / 4Q / 16D
- Surface: Hard (indoor)
- Location: Pau, France

Champions

Singles
- (Latvia) Ernests Gulbis

Doubles
- (France) Benjamin Bonzi / (France) Antoine Hoang
← 2019 ·	Teréga Open Pau–Pyrénées	· 2021 →

The 2020 Teréga Open Pau–Pyrénées was a professional tennis tournament played on indoor hardcourts. It was the second edition of the tournament which was part of the 2020 ATP Challenger Tour. It took place in Pau, France between 24 February and 1 March 2020.

== Singles main-draw entrants ==
=== Seeds ===
Country	Player	Rank^{1}	Seed
CZE	Jiří Veselý	74	1
SVK	Norbert Gombos	102	2
IND	Sumit Nagal	126	3
FRA	Antoine Hoang	129	4
GER	Yannick Maden	144	5
UKR	Sergiy Stakhovsky	151	6
ITA	Lorenzo Giustino	154	7
SVK	Lukáš Lacko	162	8
NED	Robin Haase	163	9
FRA	Maxime Janvier	175	10
ARG	Marco Trungelliti	192	11
FRA	Quentin Halys	193	12
FRA	Constant Lestienne	201	13
FRA	Elliot Benchetrit	202	14
NED	Botic van de Zandschulp	204	15
FRA	Enzo Couacaud	208	16

- ^{1} Rankings are as of 17 February 2020.

=== Other entrants ===
The following players received wildcards into the singles main draw:

- (France) Benjamin Bonzi
- (Sweden) Leo Borg
- (Poland) Jerzy Janowicz
- (France) Harold Mayot
- (France) Rayane Roumane

The following players received entry into the singles main draw using protected rankings:

- (Belgium) Arthur De Greef
- (Slovenia) Blaž Kavčič

The following players received entry into the singles main draw as alternates:

- (Austria) Lucas Miedler
- (Italy) Andrea Vavassori

The following players received entry from the qualifying draw:

- (France) Fabien Reboul
- (Chinese Taipei) Tseng Chun-hsin

== Champions ==
=== Singles ===
- (Latvia) Ernests Gulbis def. (Poland) Jerzy Janowicz 6–3, 6–4.

=== Doubles ===
- (France) Benjamin Bonzi / (France) Antoine Hoang def. (Italy) Simone Bolelli / (Romania) Florin Mergea 6–3, 6–2.
