= 2021 Teréga Open Pau–Pyrénées – Singles =

Pyrénées – Singles
- 2021 Teréga Open Pau–Pyrénées

Final
- Champion: (Moldova) Radu Albot
- Runner-up: (Czech Republic) Jiří Lehečka
- Score: 6–2, 7–6^{(7–5)}

Events
Singles	Doubles
- Teréga Open Pau–Pyrénées

Ernests Gulbis was the defending champion but chose not to defend his title.

Radu Albot won the title after defeating Jiří Lehečka 6–2, 7–6^{(7–5)} in the final.

== Seeds ==
1. (Spain) Feliciano López (quarterfinals)
2. (Denmark) Holger Rune (semifinals)
3. (France) Gilles Simon (first round)
4. (Austria) Dennis Novak (first round)
5. (Slovakia) Norbert Gombos (quarterfinals)
6. (United States) Maxime Cressy (quarterfinals)
7. (Moldova) Radu Albot (champion)
8. (Czech Republic) Zdeněk Kolář (first round)

== Draw ==
Key

- Q = Qualifier
- WC = Wild card
- LL = Lucky loser
- Alt = Alternate
- ITF = ITF entry
- PR = Protected ranking
- SR = Special ranking
- SE = Special exempt
- JE = Junior exempt
- JR = Junior Accelerator Programme entrant
- CO = College Accelerator Programme entrant
- NG = Next Gen Accelerator Program entrant
- w/o = Walkover
- r = Retired
- d = Defaulted

=== Finals ===
Semifinals
7	(Moldova) Radu Albot	6	6^{3}	6
(Ukraine) Sergiy Stakhovsky	2	7^{7}	1
(Czech Republic) Jiří Lehečka	3	6	6
2	(Denmark) Holger Rune	6	3	4

Final
7	(Moldova) Radu Albot	6	7^{7}
(Czech Republic) Jiří Lehečka	2	6^{5}

=== Top half ===
First round
1	(Spain) F López	6	6
(Italy) T Fabbiano	2	1
(Croatia) D Ajduković	0	7^{7}	6
(Chinese Taipei) C-h Tseng	6	6^{5}	2
(Italy) A Giannessi	5	6	2
Q	(Ukraine) G Kravchenko	7	4	6
(France) C Lestienne	2	6	2
7	(Moldova) R Albot	6	4	6
4	(Austria) D Novak	3	1
(Ukraine) S Stakhovsky	6	6
(Canada) S Diez	6	6^{2}	2
WC	(France) D Added	1	7^{7}	6
(Italy) A Arnaboldi	2	4
Alt	(Russia) P Kotov	6	6
WC	(France) G Debru	4	1
5	(Slovakia) N Gombos	6	6

Second round
1	(Spain) F López	6	4	6
(Croatia) D Ajduković	3	6	4
Q	(Ukraine) G Kravchenko	6^{2}	4
7	(Moldova) R Albot	7^{7}	6
(Ukraine) S Stakhovsky	6	4	6
WC	(France) D Added	4	6	4
Alt	(Russia) P Kotov	3	4
5	(Slovakia) N Gombos	6	6

Quarterfinals
1	(Spain) F López	3	6^{5}
7	(Moldova) R Albot	6	7^{7}
(Ukraine) S Stakhovsky	6	1	7^{7}
5	(Slovakia) N Gombos	4	6	6^{5}

Semifinals
7	(Moldova) R Albot	6	6^{3}	6
(Ukraine) S Stakhovsky	2	7^{7}	1

=== Bottom half ===
First round
8	(Czech Republic) Z Kolář	4	4
WC	(France) H Mayot	6	6
Q	(Belgium) M Geerts	6	6
(Italy) R Marcora	4	2
(France) M Janvier	3	7^{7}	3
Q	(France) C Hemery	6	6^{5}	6
(Czech Republic) J Lehečka	6	6^{2}	6
3	(France) G Simon	1	7^{7}	2
6	(United States) M Cressy	6	4	7^{7}
Alt	(France) G Blancaneaux	3	6	6^{5}
(United States) A Ritschard	7^{7}	1	2
(Ukraine) V Sachko	6^{1}	6	6
SE	(Japan) H Moriya	6^{5}	4
Q	(Germany) S Fanselow	7^{7}	6
Alt	(Belgium) J Cagnina	0	5
2	(Denmark) H Rune	6	7

Second round
WC	(France) H Mayot	6	4	7^{7}
Q	(Belgium) M Geerts	0	6	6^{5}
Q	(France) C Hemery	6^{4}	6	5
(Czech Republic) J Lehečka	7^{7}	4	7
6	(United States) M Cressy	0	6	6
(Ukraine) V Sachko	6	1	1
Q	(Germany) S Fanselow	2	2
2	(Denmark) H Rune	6	6

Quarterfinals
WC	(France) H Mayot	4	2
(Czech Republic) J Lehečka	6	6
6	(United States) M Cressy	2	2
2	(Denmark) H Rune	6	6

Semifinals
(Czech Republic) J Lehečka	3	6	6
2	(Denmark) H Rune	6	3	4
