= 2021 Teréga Open Pau–Pyrénées =

- Date: 15–21 November
- Edition: 3rd
- Surface: Hard (Indoor)
- Location: Pau, France

Champions

Singles
- (Moldova) Radu Albot

Doubles
- (Monaco) Romain Arneodo / (Austria) Tristan-Samuel Weissborn
- Teréga Open Pau–Pyrénées

The 2021 Teréga Open Pau–Pyrénées was a professional tennis tournament played on indoor hardcourts. It was the third edition of the tournament which was part of the 2021 ATP Challenger Tour. It took place in Pau, France between 15 and 21 November 2021.

== Singles main-draw entrants ==
=== Seeds ===
Country	Player	Rank^{1}	Seed
ESP	Feliciano López	103	1
DEN	Holger Rune	109	2
FRA	Gilles Simon	118	3
AUT	Dennis Novak	119	4
SVK	Norbert Gombos	120	5
USA	Maxime Cressy	128	6
MDA	Radu Albot	134	7
CZE	Zdeněk Kolář	139	8

- ^{1} Rankings are as of 8 November 2021.

=== Other entrants ===
The following players received wildcards into the singles main draw:

- (France) Dan Added
- (France) Gabriel Debru
- (France) Harold Mayot

The following player received entry into the singles main draw as a special exempt:

- (Japan) Hiroki Moriya

The following players received entry into the singles main draw as alternates:

- (France) Geoffrey Blancaneaux
- (Belgium) Julien Cagnina
- (Russia) Pavel Kotov

The following players received entry from the qualifying draw:

- (Germany) Sebastian Fanselow
- (Belgium) Michael Geerts
- (France) Calvin Hemery
- (Ukraine) Georgii Kravchenko

== Champions ==
=== Singles ===
- (Moldova) Radu Albot def. (Czech Republic) Jiří Lehečka 6–2, 7–6^{(7–5)}.

=== Doubles ===
- (Monaco) Romain Arneodo / (Austria) Tristan-Samuel Weissborn def. (Pakistan) Aisam-ul-Haq Qureshi / (Spain) David Vega Hernández 6–4, 6–2.
