= 2022 Teréga Open Pau–Pyrénées =

- Date: 21–27 February
- Edition: 4th
- Surface: Hard (indoor)
- Location: Pau, France

Champions

Singles
- (France) Quentin Halys

Doubles
- (France) Albano Olivetti / (Spain) David Vega Hernández
| ← 2021 · | Teréga Open Pau–Pyrénées | · 2023 → |

The 2022 Teréga Open Pau–Pyrénées was a professional tennis tournament played on indoor hardcourts. It was the fourth edition of the tournament which was part of the 2022 ATP Challenger Tour. It took place in Pau, France between 21 and 27 February 2022.

== Singles main-draw entrants ==
=== Seeds ===
| Country | Player | Rank^{1} | Seed |
|---|---|---|---|
| ~~FRA~~ | ~~Benjamin Bonzi~~ | ~~69~~ | ~~1~~ |
| ~~FRA~~ | ~~Richard Gasquet~~ | ~~76~~ | ~~2~~ |
| CZE | Jiří Lehečka | 95 | 3 |
| FRA | Pierre-Hugues Herbert | 109 | 4 |
| SVK | Norbert Gombos | 114 | 5 |
| FRA | Gilles Simon | 132 | 6 |
| FRA | Quentin Halys | 137 | 7 |
| CAN | Vasek Pospisil | 146 | 8 |

- ^{1} Rankings are as of 14 February 2022.

=== Other entrants ===
The following players received wildcards into the singles main draw:

- (Morocco) Elliot Benchetrit
- (France) Harold Mayot
- (France) Jo-Wilfried Tsonga

The following players received entry into the singles main draw as alternates:

- (France) Maxime Janvier
- (Germany) Nicola Kuhn

The following players received entry from the qualifying draw:

- (France) Antoine Escoffier
- (France) Arthur Fils
- (Latvia) Ernests Gulbis
- (United States) Emilio Nava
- (United Kingdom) Ryan Peniston
- (France) Luca Van Assche

The following players received entry as lucky losers:

- (Moldova) Radu Albot
- (China) Zhang Zhizhen

== Champions ==
=== Singles ===
- (France) Quentin Halys def. (Canada) Vasek Pospisil 4–6, 6–4, 6–3.

=== Doubles ===
- (France) Albano Olivetti / (Spain) David Vega Hernández def. (Poland) Karol Drzewiecki / (Poland) Kacper Żuk walkover.
