= Raphaël Collignon =

Belgian tennis player (born 2002)

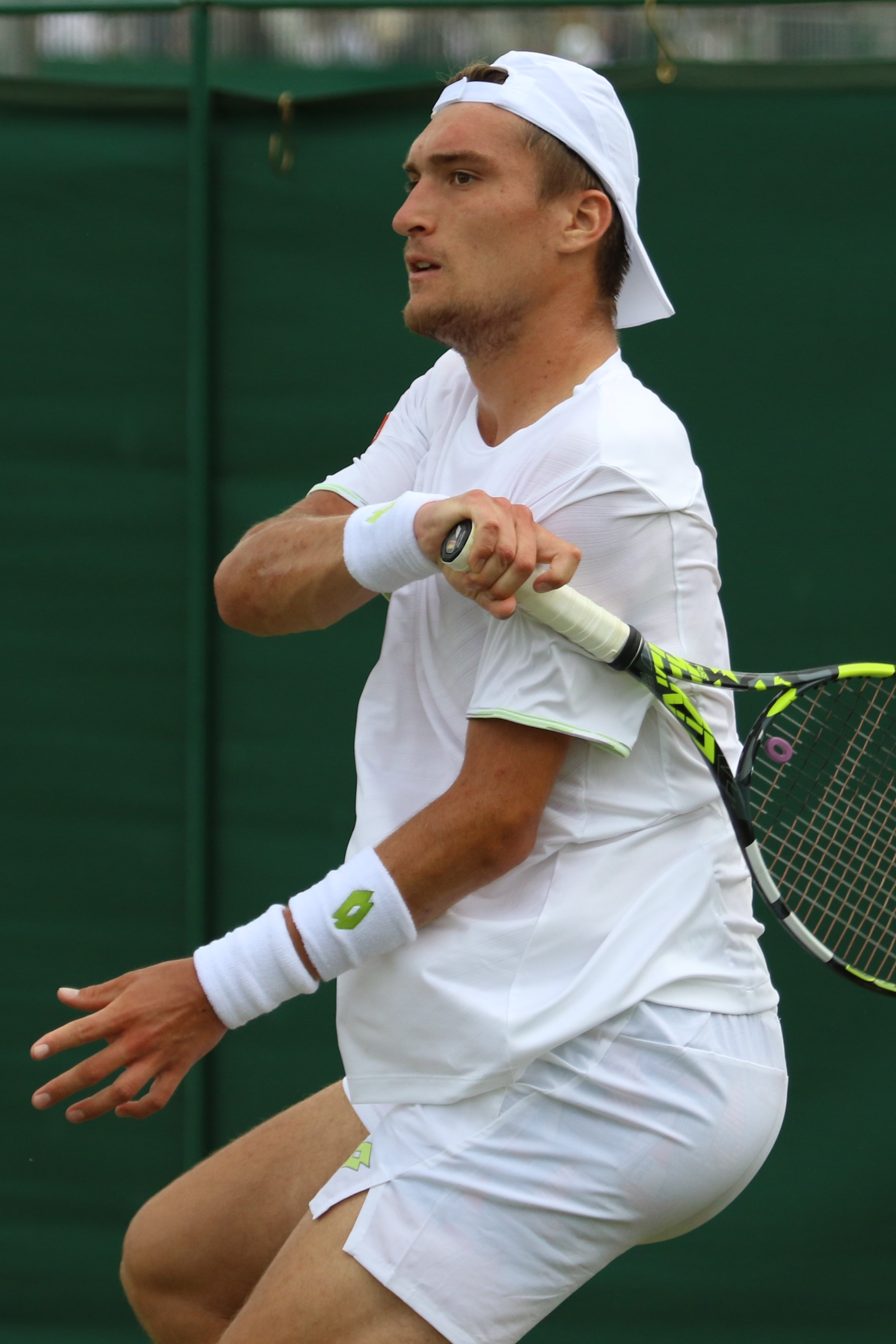
- Collignon at the 2023 Wimbledon Championships
- Country (sports): Belgium
- Residence: Liège, Belgium
- Born: 13 January 2002 (age 24) Rochester, Minnesota, US
- Height: 1.91 m (6 ft 3 in)
- Turned pro: 2022
- Plays: Right-handed (two-handed backhand)
- Coach: Steve Darcis
- Prize money: US $1,681,922

Singles
- Career record: 24–25
- Career titles: 0
- Highest ranking: No. 37 (20 July 2026)
- Current ranking: No. 55 (9 November 2026)

Grand Slam singles results
- Australian Open: 1R (2026)
- French Open: 3R (2026)
- Wimbledon: 1R (2025, 2026)
- US Open: 3R (2025)

Doubles
- Career record: 2–6
- Career titles: 0
- Highest ranking: No. 435 (31 March 2025)
- Current ranking: No. 1,342 (20 July 2026)

Grand Slam doubles results
- Australian Open: 1R (2026)
- French Open: 2R (2026)
- US Open: 1R (2025)
- Last updated on: 25 July 2026.

Raphaël Collignon (born 13 January 2002) is a Belgian professional tennis player. He has a career-high ATP singles ranking of world No. 37 achieved on 20 July 2026 and a best doubles ranking of No. 435, reached on 31 March 2025. He is the No. 3 Belgian player in men's singles.

Collignon has won six singles titles on the ATP Challenger Tour. He represents Belgium at the Davis Cup.

== Professional career ==
=== 2022: First pro titles ===
Collignon earned four titles on ITF Men's Tour throughout 2022; this included the Marburg Open, Germany, a M25-level event, which he won without dropping a set. He defeated Yshai Oliel in the final.

=== 2023: Maiden Challenger final, top 250 ===
In April 2023, Collignon reached his first ATP Challenger final, at the Challenger di Roseto degli Abruzzi, Italy, where he lost to first seed Filip Misolic. As a result, he moved into the top 215 in the singles rankings on 24 April 2023 and entered the qualification competition of a Grand Slam for the first time, at the 2023 French Open.

=== 2024: Maiden Challenger title, ATP & top 125 debuts ===
In August 2024, Collignon won his maiden Challenger title at the Platzmann-Sauerland Open, Germany, defeating first seed Botic van de Zandschulp in the final.

The Belgian received a wildcard for a home tournament, the 2024 European Open, making his ATP Tour debut. He lost in the first round to Marton Fucsovics.

After his second Challenger title at the All In Open, France, he ended that season ranked inside the top 125 in the singles rankings on 18 November 2024.

=== 2025: Major debut & third round, ATP semifinal, top 100 ===
Following his third Challenger title at the Teréga Open Pau–Pyrénées, Collignon reached the top 100 for the first time, with a career-high singles ranking of world No. 98 on 24 February 2025.

In April, at the 2025 Grand Prix Hassan II, Morocco, Collignon defeated former top-10 player Fabio Fognini to record his first ATP Tour win.

In June, Collignon made his Grand Slam debut at the 2025 Wimbledon Championships, losing in the first round to former finalist Marin Čilić. The Belgian recorded his first major win later that season, at the US Open, defeating lucky loser Daniel Elahi Galán in the first round, and then went on to upset 12th seed and former US Open finalist Casper Ruud for the biggest win of his career thus far. He ultimately lost to 20th seed Jiří Lehečka in the third round.

Playing at his home tournament, the European Open for the second time as a wildcard, Collignon reached his first ATP Tour semifinal with wins over compatriot Zizou Bergs, Francisco Comesaña and fourth seed Alejandro Davidovich Fokina.

=== 2026: Top 5 win, ATP final, top 40 debut ===
At the 2026 Australian Open, Collignon won the first set against fifth-seed Lorenzo Musetti, but ultimately retired from the match after three hours in hot conditions suffering from cramps.

In May, in his first participation at Roland Garros, Collignon defeated Aleksandar Vukic in straight sets in the first round of the 2026 French Open before defeating world No. 5 Ben Shelton in straight sets, the biggest win by ranking of his career. He lost in the third round in a fifth set tiebreak to Matteo Arnaldi.

In July he reached his first ATP final at the 2026 Swiss Open Gstaad but lost to Stefanos Tsitsipas. As a result, he moved to a new career-high singles ranking of world No. 37 on 20 July 2026. Despite having five match points, he was defeated in five sets by American wildcard Sebastian Gorzny at the 2026 US Open.

== Performance timeline ==
Key
W	F	SF	QF	#R	RR	Q#	DNQ	A	NH

(W) winner; (F) finalist; (SF) semifinalist; (QF) quarterfinalist; (#R) rounds 4, 3, 2, 1; (RR) round-robin stage; (Q#) qualification round; (DNQ) did not qualify; (A) absent; (NH) not held; (SR) strike rate (events won / competed); (W–L) win–loss record.
To avoid confusion and double counting, these charts are updated at the conclusion of a tournament or when the player's participation has ended.

=== Singles ===
Current through the 2026 Wimbledon Championships.

Tournament	2023	2024	2025	2026	SR	W–L	Win%
Grand Slam tournaments
Australian Open	A	A	Q1	1R	0 / 1	0–1	0%
French Open	Q1	A	A	3R	0 / 1	2–1	67%
Wimbledon	Q2	A	1R	1R	0 / 2	0–2	0%
US Open	A	A	3R		0 / 1	2–1	67%
Win–loss	0–0	0–0	2–2	2–3	0 / 5	4–5	44%

== ATP Tour finals ==
=== Singles: 1 (runner-up) ===
Legend Grand Slam (–) ATP 1000 (–) ATP 500 (–) ATP 250 (0–1)	Finals by surface Hard (–) Clay (0–1) Grass (–)	Finals by setting Outdoor (0–1) Indoor (–)

Result	W–L	Date	Tournament	Tier	Surface	Opponent	Score
Loss	0–1	Jul 2026	Swiss Open, Switzerland	ATP 250	Clay	(Greece) Stefanos Tsitsipas	4–6, 7–6^{(7–3)}, 3–6

== ATP Challenger Tour finals ==
Challenger

=== Singles: 12 (6 titles, 6 runner-ups) ===
Finals by surface
Hard (3–3)
Clay (3–3)

Result	W–L	Date	Tournament	Surface	Opponent	Score
Loss	0–1	Apr 2023	Challenger di Roseto degli Abruzzi, Italy	Clay	(Austria) Filip Misolic	6–4, 5–7, 6–7^{(6–8)}
Win	1–1	Aug 2024	Platzmann Open, Germany	Clay	(Netherlands) Botic van de Zandschulp	3–6, 6–4, 6–3
Loss	1–2	Sep 2024	Lisboa Belém Open, Portugal	Clay	(Switzerland) Alexander Ritschard	3–6, 7–6^{(7–3)}, 3–6
Loss	1–3	Oct 2024	Slovak Open, Slovakia	Hard (i)	Roman Safiullin	3–6, 4–6
Win	2–3	Nov 2024	All In Open, France	Hard (i)	(France) Calvin Hemery	6–4, 6–2
Win	3–3	Feb 2025	Open Pau–Pyrénées, France	Hard (i)	(Germany) Patrick Zahraj	6–2, 6–4
Loss	3–4	Feb 2025	Challenger Città di Lugano, Switzerland	Hard (i)	(Croatia) Borna Ćorić	3–6, 1–6
Win	4–4	Apr 2025	Monza Open, Italy	Clay	(Ukraine) Vitaliy Sachko	6–3, 7–5
Loss	4–5	Sep 2025	CO'Met Orléans Open, France	Hard (i)	(Spain) Martín Landaluce	7–6^{(8–6)}, 2–6, 3–6
Win	5–5	Feb 2026	Open Pau–Pyrénées, France (2)	Hard (i)	(France) Benjamin Bonzi	7–6^{(7–5)}, 6–1
Win	6–5	Apr 2026	Monza Open, Italy (2)	Clay	(Croatia) Dino Prižmić	7–6^{(7–2)}, 6–3
Loss	6–6	May 2026	BNP Paribas Primrose Bordeaux, France	Clay	(Argentina) Juan Manuel Cerúndolo	7–5, 1–6, 6–7^{(4–7)}

=== Doubles: 1 (runner-up) ===
Result	W–L	Date	Tournament	Surface	Partner	Opponents	Score
Loss	0–1	Feb 2025	Open Pau–Pyrénées, France	Hard (i)	(Belgium) Alexander Blockx	(Germany) Jakob Schnaitter (Germany) Mark Wallner	4–6, 7–6^{(7–5)}, [8–10]

== ITF World Tennis Tour finals ==
World Tennis

=== Singles: 14 (8 titles, 6 runner-ups) ===
Finals by surface
Hard (1–3)
Clay (7–3)

Result	W–L	Date	Tournament	Surface	Opponent	Score
Loss	0–1	Mar 2021	M15 Monastir, Tunisia	Hard	(Belgium) Gauthier Onclin	1–6, 1–6
Loss	0–2	Jan 2022	M15 Monastir, Tunisia	Hard	(Monaco) Valentin Vacherot	3–6, 4–6
Win	1–2	Feb 2022	M15 Monastir, Tunisia	Hard	(France) Mathys Erhard	7–6^{(7–2)}, 7–6^{(12–10)}
Loss	1–3	May 2022	M15 Brčko, Bosnia and Herzegovina	Clay	(Belgium) Gauthier Onclin	7–5, 2–6, 3–6
Win	2–3	Jun 2022	M25 Arlon, Belgium	Clay	(Belgium) Gauthier Onclin	6–4, 6–1
Win	3–3	Jul 2022	M25 Marburg, Germany	Clay	(Israel) Yshai Oliel	6–2, 6–2
Win	4–3	Aug 2022	M25 Koksijde, Belgium	Clay	(Argentina) Hernán Casanova	6–1, 6–1
Loss	4–4	Oct 2022	M25 Nevers, France	Hard (i)	(Belgium) Gauthier Onclin	3–6, 6–2, 3–6
Win	5–4	Apr 2024	M25 Hammamet, Tunisia	Clay	(Tunisia) Aziz Dougaz	4–6, 6–1, 6–1
Win	6–4	Apr 2024	M25 Angers, France	Clay (i)	(Tunisia) Aziz Dougaz	6–2, 6–4
Loss	6–5	May 2024	M25 Deauville, France	Clay	Alexey Vatutin	3–6, 4–6
Loss	6–6	Jul 2024	M25 Marburg, Germany	Clay	(Brazil) Mateus Alves	6–7^{(5–7)}, 6–1, 4–6
Win	7–6	Jul 2024	M25 Kassel, Germany	Clay	(Uzbekistan) Khumoyun Sultanov	6–1, 6–4
Win	8–6	Aug 2024	M25 Koksijde, Belgium	Clay	(Netherlands) Guy den Ouden	7–6^{(7–4)}, 6–1

=== Doubles: 1 (title) ===
Result	W–L	Date	Tournament	Surface	Partner	Opponents	Score
Win	1–0	Apr 2024	M25 Hammamet, Tunisia	Clay	(Switzerland) Jérôme Kym	(Italy) Luca Giacomini (Italy) Giuseppe Tresca	6–4, 7–5

== Wins over top 10 players ==
- Collignon's match record against players who were, at the time the match was played, ranked in the top 10.

Season	2025	2026	Total
Wins	1	1	2

#	Opponent	Rk	Event	Surface	Rd	Score	Rk	Ref
2025
1.	(Australia) Alex de Minaur	8	Davis Cup, Sydney, Australia	Hard	Q2	7–5, 3–6, 6–3	91	
2026
2.	(United States) Ben Shelton	5	French Open, France	Clay	2R	6–4, 7–5, 6–4	62	

- Key: (Rk) first use, opponent rank; (Rd) round; (Rk) 2nd use, player rank; (Ref) reference; (F) final; (SF) semifinal; (QF) quarterfinal; (#R) rounds 4, 3, 2, 1; (RR) round-robin stage; (Q#) qualifying rounds or stages (3), 2, 1.

*As of 27 May 2026
