= Patrick Zahraj =

German tennis player

- Country (sports): Germany
- Born: 17 July 1999 (age 27) Giessen, Germany
- Height: 1.91 m (6 ft 3 in)
- Plays: Right-handed (two-handed backhand)
- College: UCLA
- Coach: Yves Allegro, Cecil Mamiit
- Prize money: US $179,716

Singles
- Career record: 0–1
- Career titles: 0
- Highest ranking: No. 240 (27 October 2025)
- Current ranking: No. 524 (19 October 2026)

Doubles
- Career record: 0–1
- Career titles: 0
- Highest ranking: No. 213 (17 November 2025)
- Current ranking: No. 337 (19 October 2026)
- Last updated on: 19 October 2026.

Patrick Zahraj (born 17 July 1999) is a German tennis player. Zahraj has a career-high ATP singles ranking of world No. 240 achieved on 27 October 2025 and a doubles ranking of No. 213 achieved on 17 November 2025.

Zahraj played college tennis at UCLA.

== Career ==
Zahraj reached his first ATP Challenger final at the 2025 Open Pau-Pyrénées as a qualifier, where he lost to Raphael Collignon.

Zahraj made his ATP main draw debut at the 2025 Hamburg Open after receiving a wildcard for the doubles draw, where he partnered Andreas Mies. Zahraj made his ATP singles debut at the 2025 Swiss Open Gstaad as a lucky loser, directly into the second round, after the withdrawal of third seed Pedro Martinez (out with a right shoulder injury).

== Personal life ==
Zahraj was diagnosed with type 1 diabetes at the age of nine.

== ATP Challenger Tour finals ==
=== Singles: 1 (1 runner-up) ===
Finals by surface
Hard (0–1)
Clay (0–0)

Result	W–L	Date	Tournament	Surface	Opponent	Score
Loss	0–1	Feb 2025	Open Pau–Pyrénées, France	Hard (i)	(Belgium) Raphaël Collignon	2–6, 4–6

=== Doubles: 2 (1 title, 1 runner-up) ===
Finals by surface
Hard (1–0)
Clay (0–1)

Result	W–L	Date	Tournament	Surface	Partner	Opponents	Score
Loss	0–1	Aug 2025	Bonn Open, Germany	Clay	(Germany) Tim Rühl	(Austria) Neil Oberleitner (Netherlands) Mick Veldheer	6–4, 6–7^{(3–7)}, [10–12]
Win	1–1	Nov 2025	Charlottesville Challenger, United States	Hard (i)	(Germany) Tim Rühl	(Canada) Justin Boulais (United States) Mac Kiger	3–6, 7–5, [12–10]

== ITF World Tennis Tour finals ==
=== Singles: 3 (3 runner-ups) ===
Result	W–L	Date	Tournament	Surface	Opponent	Score
Loss	0–1	Jun 2024	M25 Klosters, Switzerland	Clay	(Switzerland) Rémy Bertola	1–6, 2–6
Loss	0–2	Aug 2025	M25 Sion, Switzerland	Clay	(Switzerland) Rémy Bertola	6–7^{(3–7)}, 2–6
Loss	0–3	Jul 2026	M25 Metzingen, Germany	Clay	(France) Raphael Perot	7–5, 4–6, 4–6
