= 2025 Teréga Open Pau–Pyrénées =

- Date: 17 – 23 February
- Edition: 7th
- Surface: Hard (indoor)
- Location: Pau, France

Champions

Singles
- (Belgium) Raphaël Collignon

Doubles
- (Germany) Jakob Schnaitter / (Germany) Mark Wallner
- Teréga Open Pau–Pyrénées

The 2025 Teréga Open Pau–Pyrénées was a professional tennis tournament played on indoor hardcourts. It was the seventh edition of the tournament which was part of the 2025 ATP Challenger Tour. It took place in Pau, France between 17 and 23 February 2025.

== Singles main-draw entrants ==
=== Seeds ===
Country	Player	Rank^{1}	Seed
GBR	Jacob Fearnley	78	1
BEL	Raphaël Collignon	122	2
FRA	Richard Gasquet	128	3
ESP	Martín Landaluce	135	4
FRA	Harold Mayot	136	5
FRA	Grégoire Barrère	151	6
BEL	Alexander Blockx	154	7
SVK	Lukáš Klein	156	8

- ^{1} Rankings are as of 10 February 2025.

=== Other entrants ===
The following players received wildcards into the singles main draw:

- (France) Arthur Bouquier
- (United Kingdom) Arthur Fery
- (France) ~~Benoît Paire~~

The following player received entry into the singles main draw as a special exempt:

- (Austria) Filip Misolic

The following player received entry into the singles main draw as an alternate:

- (United Kingdom) Charles Broom

The following players received entry from the qualifying draw:

- (France) Maxence Beaugé
- (France) Pierre Delage
- Evgeny Karlovskiy
- (Slovakia) Lukáš Pokorný
- (France) Lucas Poullain
- (Germany) Patrick Zahraj

The following players received entry as lucky losers:

- (Argentina) Pedro Cachin
- (France) Maxime Janvier
- Alexey Vatutin

== Champions ==
=== Singles ===
- (Belgium) Raphaël Collignon def. (Germany) Patrick Zahraj 6–2, 6–4.

=== Doubles ===
- (Germany) Jakob Schnaitter / (Germany) Mark Wallner def. (Belgium) Alexander Blockx / (Belgium) Raphaël Collignon 6–4, 6–7^{(5–7)}, [10–8].
