= 2023 Teréga Open Pau–Pyrénées =

- Date: 27 February – 5 March
- Edition: 5th
- Surface: Hard (indoor)
- Location: Pau, France

Champions

Singles
- (France) Luca Van Assche

Doubles
- (France) Dan Added / (France) Albano Olivetti
← 2022 ·	Teréga Open Pau–Pyrénées	· 2024 →

The 2023 Teréga Open Pau–Pyrénées was a professional tennis tournament played on indoor hardcourts. It was the fifth edition of the tournament which was part of the 2023 ATP Challenger Tour. It took place in Pau, France between 27 February and 5 March 2023.

== Singles main-draw entrants ==
=== Seeds ===
Country	Player	Rank^{1}	Seed
FRA	Arthur Rinderknech	72	1
FRA	Ugo Humbert	85	2
NED	Gijs Brouwer	116	3
FRA	Arthur Fils	118	4
ITA	Raúl Brancaccio	123	5
~~ITA~~	~~Giulio Zeppieri~~	~~127~~	~~6~~
BEL	Zizou Bergs	132	7
AUT	Jurij Rodionov	134	8
GER	Jan-Lennard Struff	136	9

- ^{1} Rankings are as of 20 February 2023.

=== Other entrants ===
The following players received wildcards into the singles main draw:

- (France) Gabriel Debru
- (France) Calvin Hemery
- (Estonia) Mark Lajal

The following players received entry into the singles main draw as alternates:

- (France) ~~Antoine Escoffier~~
- (Australia) Li Tu
- (Japan) Kaichi Uchida

The following players received entry from the qualifying draw:

- (France) Ugo Blanchet
- (France) Mathias Bourgue
- (China) Bu Yunchaokete
- (Belgium) Joris De Loore
- Evgeny Donskoy
- (France) Valentin Royer

The following players received entry as lucky losers:

- (France) Dan Added
- (Germany) Louis Wessels

== Champions ==
=== Singles ===
- (France) Luca Van Assche def. (France) Ugo Humbert 7–6^{(7–5)}, 4–6, 7–6^{(8–6)}.

=== Doubles ===
- (France) Dan Added / (France) Albano Olivetti def. (United Kingdom) Julian Cash / (Germany) Constantin Frantzen 3–6, 6–1, [10–8].
