= Sam Weissborn =

Austrian tennis player

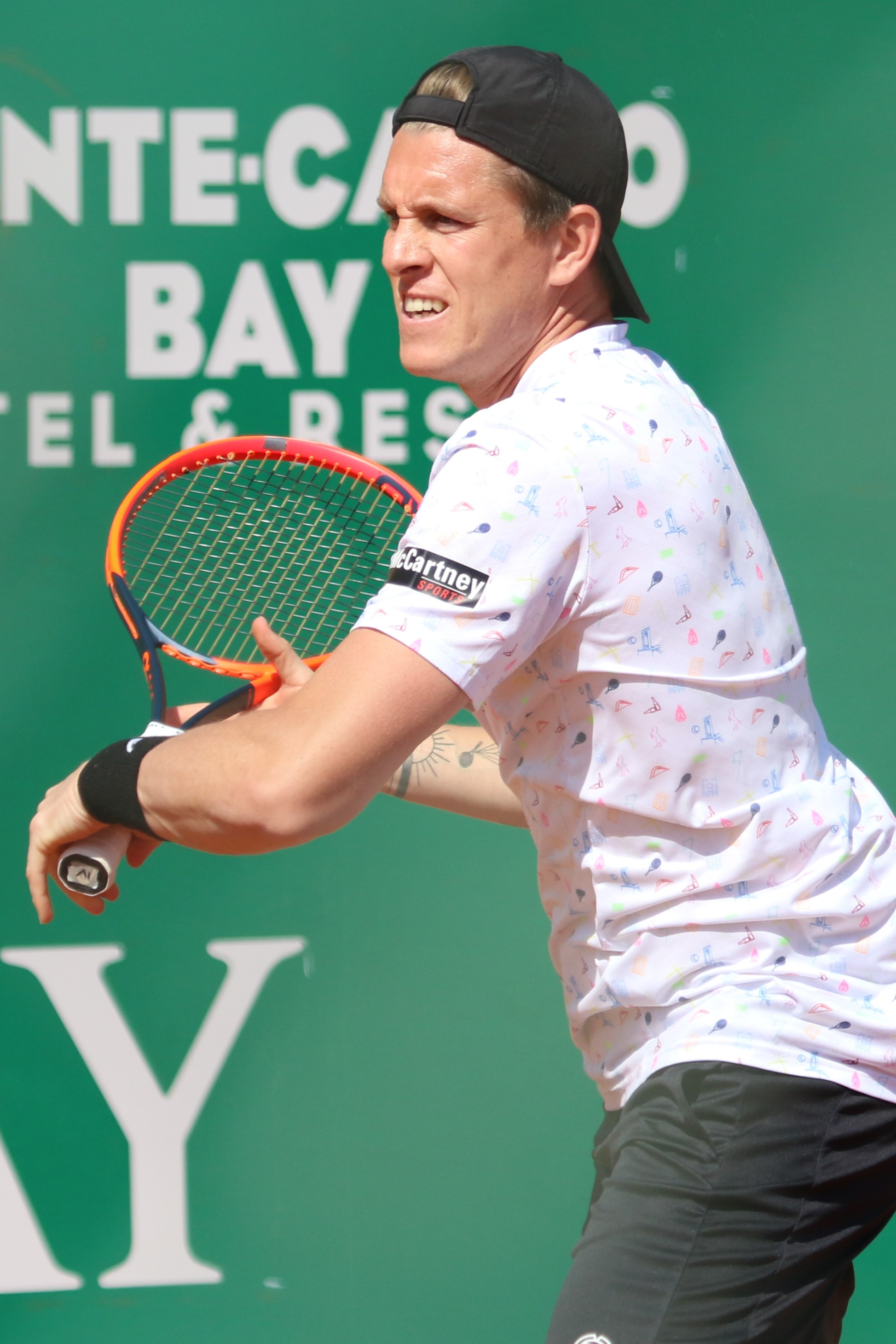
- Weissborn at the 2023 Monte-Carlo Masters
- ITF name: Tristan-Samuel Weissborn
- Country (sports): Austria
- Residence: Korneuburg, Austria
- Born: 24 October 1991 (age 34) Vienna, Austria
- Height: 1.83 m (6 ft 0 in)
- Turned pro: 2009
- Plays: Left-handed (two handed-backhand)
- Coach: Ivan Galić, Roy Krawcewicz
- Prize money: $548,754

Singles
- Career record: 0–0
- Career titles: 0
- Highest ranking: No. 503 (22 July 2013)

Doubles
- Career record: 26–38
- Career titles: 0
- Highest ranking: No. 50 (17 July 2023)

Grand Slam doubles results
- Australian Open: 1R (2021, 2024)
- French Open: 2R (2023)
- Wimbledon: 2R (2023, 2024)
- US Open: 2R (2016)

Tristan-Samuel Weissborn (born 24 October 1991) is an Austrian inactive professional tennis player who specializes in doubles. He has been ranked by the ATP as high as world No. 50 in doubles, which he achieved in July 2023. Weissborn has won 20 doubles titles on the ATP Challenger Tour as well as one singles and 23 doubles titles on the ITF Men's World Tennis Tour.

== Professional career ==
=== 2015–2016: ATP debut ===
Weissborn won his first ATP Challenger title at the 2015 Sparkassen ATP Challenger, partnering Maximilian Neuchrist.

Weissborn made his ATP World Tour doubles debut at the 2016 Swiss Open Gstaad, where he reached with partner Sander Arends the semifinals.

=== 2022: Maiden ATP final ===
He reached his maiden ATP doubles final at the 2022 Córdoba Open with Andrej Martin.

=== 2023: Masters debut and first final, Top 50 ===
On his debut at an ATP Masters 1000 tournament, he reached his first semifinal at the 2023 Monte-Carlo Masters with partner Romain Arneodo after upsetting the second-seeded defending champions Rajeev Ram and Joe Salisbury as well as sixth-seeded Lloyd Glasspool and Harri Heliövaara. They reached their first Masters final defeating German duo Kevin Krawietz and Tim Pütz. As a result, he moved into the top 60 in the doubles rankings at world No. 59 on 24 April 2023.

== Significant finals ==
=== Masters 1000 finals ===
==== Doubles: 1 (1 runner-up) ====
Outcome	Year	Tournament	Surface	Partner	Opponents	Score
Loss	2023	Monte-Carlo Masters	Clay	(Monaco) Romain Arneodo	(Croatia) Ivan Dodig (United States) Austin Krajicek	0–6, 6–4, [12–14]

== ATP career finals ==
=== Doubles: 3 (3 runners-up) ===
Legend Grand Slam Tournaments (0–0) ATP World Tour Finals (0–0) ATP World Tour Masters 1000 (0–1) ATP World Tour 500 Series (0–0) ATP World Tour 250 Series (0–2)	Titles by surface Hard (0–1) Clay (0–2) Grass (0–0) Carpet (0–0)

Result	W–L	Date	Tournament	Tier	Surface	Partner	Opponents	Score
Loss	0–1	Feb 2022	Córdoba Open, Argentina	250 Series	Clay	(Slovakia) Andrej Martin	(Mexico) Santiago González (Argentina) Andrés Molteni	5–7, 3–6
Loss	0–2	Apr 2023	Monte-Carlo Masters, Monaco	Masters 1000	Clay	(Monaco) Romain Arneodo	(Croatia) Ivan Dodig (United States) Austin Krajicek	0–6, 6–4, [12–14]
Loss	0–3	Feb 2024	Open Sud de France, France	250 Series	Hard (i)	(France) Albano Olivetti	(France) Sadio Doumbia (France) Fabien Reboul	7–6^{(7–5)}, 4–6, [6–10]

== Challenger and Futures finals ==
=== Singles: 2 (1–1) ===
Legend (singles) ATP Challenger Tour (0–0) ITF Futures Tour (1–1)	Titles by surface Hard (0–0) Clay (1–1) Grass (0–0) Carpet (0–0)

Result	W–L	Date	Tournament	Tier	Surface	Opponent	Score
Loss	0–1	Jul 2012	Austria F2, Kramsach	Futures	Clay	(Austria) Nicolas Reissig	3–6, 0–6
Win	1–1	May 2013	Egypt F8, Sharm El Sheikh	Futures	Clay	(Egypt) Karim Hossam	7–6^{(7–5)}, 6–4

=== Doubles: 75 (43–32) ===
Legend (doubles) ATP Challenger Tour (20–14) ITF Futures Tour (23–18)	Titles by surface Hard (17–13) Clay (26–19) Grass (0–0) Carpet (0–0)

Result	W–L	Date	Tournament	Tier	Surface	Partner	Opponents	Score
Win	1–0	Dec 2009	Dominican Republic F3, Santo Domingo	Futures	Hard	(Austria) Maximilian Neuchrist	(Venezuela) Luis David Martínez (Austria) Nikolaus Moser	0–6, 7–6^{(7–4)}, [10–8]
Loss	1–1	Jul 2010	Austria F2, Kramsach	Futures	Clay	(Austria) Maximilian Neuchrist	(Czech Republic) Petr Kovačka (Czech Republic) Marek Michalička	1–6, 3–6
Win	2–1	Aug 2010	Austria F3, Bad Waltersdorf	Futures	Clay	(Austria) Nicolas Reissig	(Czech Republic) Michal Konečný (Czech Republic) Radim Urbánek	6–2, 6–3
Loss	2–2	Sep 2010	Morocco F6, Casablanca	Futures	Clay	(Austria) Nicolas Reissig	(France) Florian Reynet (France) Maxime Teixeira	6–1, 5–7, [6–10]
Win	3–2	Jul 2011	Austria F2, Kramsach	Futures	Clay	(Austria) Maximilian Neuchrist	(Czech Republic) Roman Jebavý (Czech Republic) Roman Vögeli	6–3, 6–3
Win	4–2	Aug 2011	Austria F5, Innsbruck	Futures	Clay	(Croatia) Mate Pavić	(Greece) Paris Gemouchidis (Czech Republic) Michal Konečný	7–6^{(7–3)}, 6–4
Win	5–2	Sep 2011	Austria F8, St. Pölten	Futures	Clay	(Austria) Maximilian Neuchrist	(Czech Republic) Roman Jebavý (Slovakia) Michal Pažický	7–5, 5–7, [11–9]
Win	6–2	Feb 2012	Spain F1, Mallorca	Futures	Clay	(Germany) Kevin Krawietz	(Spain) Agustín Boje-Ordóñez (Spain) Pablo Martín-Adalia	6–2, 6–4
Win	7–2	Apr 2012	Croatia F6, Vrsar	Futures	Clay	(Austria) Lukas Jastraunig	(Croatia) Krešimir Ritz (Croatia) Joško Topić	6–4, 4–6, [10–8]
Win	8–2	Jun 2012	Slovenia F1, Bled	Futures	Clay	(Croatia) Mislav Hižak	(Slovenia) Aljaž Bedene (Slovenia) Grega Žemlja	w/o
Loss	8–3	Aug 2012	Austria F6, Innsbruck	Futures	Clay	(Austria) Lukas Jastraunig	(Austria) Maximilian Neuchrist (Croatia) Mate Pavić	4–6, 3–6
Win	9–3	Aug 2012	Austria F7, Pörtschach	Futures	Clay	(Austria) Lukas Jastraunig	(Austria) Maximilian Neuchrist (Croatia) Mate Pavić	7–6^{(7–5)}, 6–3
Win	10–3	Sep 2012	Austria F8, St. Pölten	Futures	Clay	(Austria) Lukas Jastraunig	(Slovakia) Radoslav Novodomec (Slovakia) Michal Pažický	6–2, 6–2
Loss	10–4	Sep 2012	Austria F9, Vogau	Futures	Clay	(Austria) Lukas Jastraunig	(Philippines) Ruben Gonzales (Slovenia) Blaž Rola	2–6, 2–6
Loss	10–5	Mar 2013	Croatia F5, Rovinj	Futures	Clay	(Austria) Nikolaus Moser	(Bosnia and Herzegovina) Tomislav Brkić (Canada) Steven Diez	2–6, 2–6
Win	11–5	Apr 2013	Egypt F3, Sharm El Sheikh	Futures	Clay	(Austria) Gibril Diarra	(Estonia) Vladimir Ivanov (Russia) Ivan Nedelko	7–6^{(9–7)}, 3–6, [13–11]
Win	12–5	Apr 2013	Egypt F4, Sharm El Sheikh	Futures	Clay	(Austria) Thomas Statzberger	(Austria) Lukas Jastraunig (Austria) David Pamminger	4–6, 6–4, [10–6]
Win	13–5	Jul 2013	Austria F2, Seefeld	Futures	Clay	(Austria) Lukas Jastraunig	(Czech Republic) Michal Franek (Czech Republic) Jan Kunčík	7–6^{(7–5)}, 6–3
Loss	13–6	Jul 2013	Austria F3, Telfs	Futures	Clay	(Austria) Lukas Jastraunig	(Austria) Marc Rath (Austria) Bastian Trinker	5–7, 6–7^{(9–11)}
Win	14–6	Jul 2013	Austria F4, Kramsach	Futures	Clay	(Austria) Lukas Jastraunig	(Israel) Or Ram-Harel (Israel) Igor Smilansky	2–6, 6–4, [10–5]
Loss	14–7	Aug 2013	Austria F8, Pörtschach	Futures	Clay	(Austria) Lukas Jastraunig	(Czech Republic) Jaroslav Pospíšil (Germany) Sebastian Wagner	2–6, 6–7^{(4–7)}
Loss	14–8	Oct 2013	Kuwait F3, Mishref	Futures	Hard	(Austria) Thomas Statzberger	(United Kingdom) Lewis Burton (United Kingdom) Marcus Willis	2–6, 2–6
Loss	14–9	Jun 2014	Hungary F3, Siófok	Futures	Clay	(Hungary) Viktor Filipenkó	(Chile) Cristóbal Saavedra Corvalán (Chile) Ricardo Urzúa Rivera	1–6, 1–6
Loss	14–10	Aug 2014	Austria F8, Vogau	Futures	Clay	(Kazakhstan) Dmitry Popko	(Austria) Pascal Brunner (Austria) Thomas Statzberger	6–2, 1–6, [10–12]
Win	15–10	Aug 2014	Austria F9, Pörtschach	Futures	Clay	(Austria) Sebastian Bader	(Portugal) Gonçalo Oliveira (Germany) Daniel Uhlig	6–4, 7–6^{(7–3)}
Loss	15–11	Sep 2014	Austria F10, St. Pölten	Futures	Clay	(Austria) Sebastian Bader	(Czech Republic) Filip Doležel (Czech Republic) Petr Michnev	7–6^{(7–4)}, 4–6, [5–10]
Loss	15–12	Sep 2014	Croatia F19, Bol	Futures	Clay	(Russia) Kirill Dmitriev	(Czech Republic) Libor Salaba (Czech Republic) Jan Šátral	4–6, 1–6
Win	16–12	Oct 2014	Turkey F37, Antalya	Futures	Hard	(Slovenia) Janez Semrajc	(Russia) Kirill Dmitriev (Austria) Dennis Novak	6–3, 5–7, [10–2]
Loss	16–13	Nov 2014	Turkey F38, Antalya	Futures	Hard	(Slovenia) Janez Semrajc	(Germany) Adrian Obert (Germany) Paul Woerner	3–6, 6–1, [8–10]
Loss	16–14	Nov 2014	Turkey F40, Antalya	Futures	Hard	(Slovenia) Janez Semrajc	(Germany) Kevin Krawietz (Germany) Maximilian Marterer	3–6, 2–6
Win	17–14	Nov 2014	Turkey F41, Antalya	Futures	Hard	(Slovenia) Janez Semrajc	(Germany) Matthias Wunner (Germany) Lennart Zynga	6–3, 6–3
Win	18–14	Nov 2014	Turkey F42, Antalya	Futures	Hard	(Austria) Lucas Miedler	(Switzerland) Antoine Bellier (Switzerland) Adrian Bodmer	7–5, 6–1
Loss	18–15	Feb 2015	Turkey F6, Antalya	Futures	Hard	(France) Gleb Sakharov	(South Africa) Ruan Roelofse (South Africa) Tucker Vorster	3–6, 6–2, [7–10]
Win	19–15	Feb 2015	Turkey F7, Antalya	Futures	Hard	(Ukraine) Marat Deviatiarov	(South Africa) Ruan Roelofse (South Africa) Tucker Vorster	7–6^{(7–5)}, 6–2
Loss	19–16	Mar 2015	Turkey F8, Antalya	Futures	Hard	(Ukraine) Marat Deviatiarov	(South Africa) Ruan Roelofse (South Africa) Tucker Vorster	7–6^{(7–5)}, 6–7^{(4–7)}, [10–12]
Loss	19–17	Apr 2015	France F8, Angers	Futures	Clay (i)	(Austria) Sebastian Bader	(France) Jonathan Eysseric (France) Tom Jomby	3–6, 4–6
Loss	19–18	May 2015	Romania F1, Galați	Futures	Clay	(Switzerland) Luca Margaroli	(Romania) Alexandru-Daniel Carpen (Romania) Luca George Tatomir	5–7, 3–6
Win	20–18	Jul 2015	Italy F17, Sassuolo	Futures	Clay	(Egypt) Mohamed Safwat	(Italy) Alessandro Giannessi (Italy) Matteo Volante	4–6, 7–5, [10–8]
Win	21–18	Aug 2015	Italy F22, Appiano	Futures	Clay	(Austria) Maximilian Neuchrist	(Brazil) Wilson Leite (Brazil) Bruno Sant'Anna	7–5, 4–6, [10–3]
Win	22–18	Aug 2015	Italy F23, Este	Futures	Clay	(Austria) Maximilian Neuchrist	(Brazil) Rafael Matos (Brazil) Marcelo Zormann	2–6, 6–3, [10–8]
Win	23–18	Sep 2015	Austria F10, St. Pölten	Futures	Clay	(Austria) Lucas Miedler	(Austria) Pascal Brunner (Austria) Dennis Novak	6–3, 6–3
Win	24–18	Nov 2015	Ortisei, Italy	Challenger	Hard (i)	(Austria) Maximilian Neuchrist	(Croatia) Nikola Mektić (Croatia) Antonio Šančić	7–6^{(9–7)}, 6–3
Win	25–18	May 2016	Ostrava, Czech Republic	Challenger	Clay	(Netherlands) Sander Arends	(Czech Republic) Lukáš Dlouhý (Chile) Hans Podlipnik Castillo	7–6^{(10–8)}, 6–7^{(4–7)}, [10–5]
Loss	25–19	May 2016	Rome, Italy	Challenger	Clay	(Netherlands) Sander Arends	(China) Bai Yan (China) Li Zhe	3–6, 6–3, [9–11]
Win	26–19	May 2016	Heilbronn, Germany	Challenger	Clay	(Netherlands) Sander Arends	(Croatia) Nikola Mektić (Croatia) Antonio Šančić	6–3, 6–4
Loss	26–20	Jun 2016	Fürth, Germany	Challenger	Clay	(Slovakia) Andrej Martin	(Argentina) Facundo Argüello (Venezuela) Roberto Maytín	3–6, 4–6
Win	27–20	Feb 2017	Budapest, Hungary	Challenger	Hard (i)	(Croatia) Dino Marcan	(Slovenia) Blaž Kavčič (Croatia) Franko Škugor	6–3, 3–6, [16–14]
Loss	27–21	Feb 2017	Cherbourg, France	Challenger	Hard (i)	(Croatia) Dino Marcan	(Czech Republic) Roman Jebavý (Slovakia) Igor Zelenay	6–7^{(4–7)}, 7–6^{(7–4)}, [6–10]
Loss	27–22	Feb 2017	Bergamo, Italy	Challenger	Hard (i)	(Croatia) Dino Marcan	(Austria) Julian Knowle (Canada) Adil Shamasdin	3–6, 3–6
Win	28–22	Apr 2017	Anning, China	Challenger	Clay	(Croatia) Dino Marcan	(Australia) Steven de Waard (Slovenia) Blaž Kavčič	5–7, 6–3, [10–7]
Loss	28–23	Jun 2017	Vicenza, Italy	Challenger	Clay	(United States) Sekou Bangoura	(Germany) Gero Kretschmer (Germany) Alexander Satschko	4–6, 6–7^{(4–7)}
Loss	28–24	Jun 2017	Poprad-Tatry, Slovakia	Challenger	Clay	(Switzerland) Luca Margaroli	(Poland) Mateusz Kowalczyk (Germany) Andreas Mies	3–6, 6–7^{(3–7)}
Win	29–24	Jul 2017	Prague, Czech Republic	Challenger	Clay	(Czech Republic) Jan Šátral	(Germany) Gero Kretschmer (Germany) Andreas Mies	3–6, 7–5, [10–3]
Loss	29–25	Nov 2017	Brescia, Italy	Challenger	Hard (i)	(Switzerland) Luca Margaroli	(Netherlands) Sander Arends (Belgium) Sander Gillé	2–6, 3–6
Win	30–25	Jan 2018	Koblenz, Germany	Challenger	Hard (i)	(Monaco) Romain Arneodo	(Netherlands) Sander Arends (Croatia) Antonio Šančić	6–7^{(4–7)}, 7–5, [10–6]
Win	31–25	Feb 2018	Cherbourg, France	Challenger	Hard (i)	(Monaco) Romain Arneodo	(Croatia) Antonio Šančić (United Kingdom) Ken Skupski	6–3, 1–6, [10–4]
Win	32–25	Mar 2018	Saint Brieuc, France	Challenger	Hard (i)	(Netherlands) Sander Arends	(United Kingdom) Luke Bambridge (United Kingdom) Joe Salisbury	4–6, 6–1, [10–7]
Loss	32–26	Sep 2018	Orléans, France	Challenger	Hard (i)	(Germany) Yannick Maden	(United Kingdom) Luke Bambridge (United Kingdom) Jonny O'Mara	2–6, 4–6
Win	33–26	Jan 2019	Rennes, France	Challenger	Hard (i)	(Netherlands) Sander Arends	(Netherlands) David Pel (Croatia) Antonio Šančić	6–4, 6–4
Loss	33–27	Mar 2019	Pau, France	Challenger	Hard (i)	(Netherlands) Sander Arends	(United Kingdom) Scott Clayton (Canada) Adil Shamasdin	6–7^{(4–7)}, 7–5, [8–10]
Loss	33–28	Apr 2019	Taipei, Taiwan	Challenger	Hard (i)	(Netherlands) Sander Arends	(India) Sriram Balaji (Israel) Jonathan Erlich	3–6, 2–6
Win	34–28	Apr 2019	Nanchang, China	Challenger	Clay (i)	(Netherlands) Sander Arends	(Australia) Alex Bolt (Australia) Akira Santillan	6–2, 6–4
Win	35–28	Jan 2020	Rennes, France	Challenger	Hard (i)	(Croatia) Antonio Sancic	(Russia) Teymuraz Gabashvili (Slovakia) Lukáš Lacko	7–5, 6–7^{(5–7)}, [10–7]
Loss	35–29	Jan 2020	Newport Beach, USA	Challenger	Hard	(Croatia) Antonio Sancic	(Ecuador) Gonzalo Escobar (Uruguay) Ariel Behar	2–6, 4–6
Win	36–29	Oct 2020	Barcelona, Spain	Challenger	Clay	(Poland) Szymon Walków	(Finland) Harri Heliövaara (United States) Alex Lawson	6–1, 4–6, [10–8]
Loss	36–30	Jun 2021	Milan, Italy	Challenger	Clay	(Germany) Dustin Brown	(Czech Republic) Vít Kopřiva (Czech Republic) Jiří Lehečka	4–6, 0–6
Win	37–30	Oct 2021	Lošinj, Croatia	Challenger	Clay	(Slovakia) Andrej Martin	(Romania) Victor Vlad Cornea (Turkey) Ergi Kırkın	6–1, 7–6^{(7–5)}
Win	38–30	Nov 2021	Ortisei, Italy	Challenger	Hard (i)	(Croatia) Antonio Šančić	(Austria) Alexander Erler (Austria) Lucas Miedler	7–6^{(10–8)}, 4–6, [10–8]
Win	39–30	Nov 2021	Pau, France	Challenger	Hard (i)	(Monaco) Romain Arneodo	(Pakistan) Aisam-ul-Haq Qureshi (Spain) David Vega Hernández	6–4, 6–2
Win	40–30	Dec 2021	Forli, Italy	Challenger	Hard (i)	(Croatia) Antonio Šančić	(Czech Republic) Lukáš Rosol (Ukraine) Vitaliy Sachko	7–6^{(7–4)}, 4–6, [10–7]
Loss	40–31	Jan 2022	Santa Cruz de la Sierra, Bolivia	Challenger	Clay	(Slovakia) Andrej Martin	(Ecuador) Diego Hidalgo (Colombia) Cristian Rodríguez	6–4, 3–6, [8–10]
Loss	40–32	Oct 2022	Saint-Tropez, France	Challenger	Hard	(Monaco) Romain Arneodo	(France) Dan Added (France) Albano Olivetti	3–6, 6–3, [10–12]
Win	41–32	Oct 2022	Vilnius, Lithuania	Challenger	Hard (i)	(Monaco) Romain Arneodo	(France) Dan Added (France) Théo Arribagé	6–4, 5–7, [10–5]
Win	42–32	Jan 2023	Ottignies-Louvain-la-Neuve, Belgium	Challenger	Hard (i)	(Monaco) Romain Arneodo	(Czech Republic) Roman Jebavý (Czech Republic) Adam Pavlásek	6–4, 6–3
Win	43–32	May 2023	Mauthausen, Austria	Challenger	Clay	(Monaco) Romain Arneodo	(Germany) Constantin Frantzen (Germany) Hendrik Jebens	6–4, 6–2

== Doubles performance timeline ==
Key
W	F	SF	QF	#R	RR	Q#	DNQ	A	NH

(W) winner; (F) finalist; (SF) semifinalist; (QF) quarterfinalist; (#R) rounds 4, 3, 2, 1; (RR) round-robin stage; (Q#) qualification round; (DNQ) did not qualify; (A) absent; (NH) not held; (SR) strike rate (events won / competed); (W–L) win–loss record.
To avoid confusion and double counting, these charts are updated at the conclusion of a tournament or when the player's participation has ended.

Tournament	2009	2010	2011	2012	2013	2014	2015	2016	2017	2018	2019	2020	2021	2022	2023	2024	SR	W–L
Grand Slam tournaments
Australian Open	A	A	A	A	A	A	A	A	A	A	A	A	1R	A	A	1R	0 / 2	0–2
French Open	A	A	A	A	A	A	A	A	A	A	A	A	A		2R		0 / 1	1–1
Wimbledon	A	A	A	A	A	A	A	Q1	1R	Q1	A	NH	A		2R		0 / 2	1–2
US Open	A	A	A	A	A	A	A	2R	A	A	A	A	A		1R		0 / 2	1–2
Win–loss	0–0	0–0	0–0	0–0	0–0	0–0	0–0	1–1	0–1	0–0	0–0	0–0	0–1	0–0	2–3	0–1	0 / 7	3–7
Career statistics
Titles / Finals	0 / 0	0 / 0	0 / 0	0 / 0	0 / 0	0 / 0	0 / 0	0 / 0	0 / 0	0 / 0	0 / 0	0 / 0	0 / 0	0 / 1	0 / 1		0 / 2	
Overall win–loss	0–0	0–0	0–0	0–0	0–0	0–0	0–0	3–2	0–4	1–3	2–4	0–0	1–6	3–1	14–15		24–35	
Year-end ranking	906	611	498	449	400	370	182	95	112	118	103	109	118	110	54			
