= Teréga Open Pau–Pyrénées =

Professional tennis tournament

- 2026 Teréga Open Pau–Pyrénées

ATP Challenger Tour
- Founded: 2019
- Editions: 8
- Location: Pau, France
- Venue: Palais des Sports de Pau
- Category: ATP Challenger Tour 125
- Surface: Hard (indoor)
- Draw: 48S/4Q/16D
- Prize money: €148,625 (2024)
- Website: website

Current champions (2026)
- Singles: (Belgium) Raphaël Collignon
- Doubles: (India) Sriram Balaji (Austria) Neil Oberleitner

The Teréga Open Pau–Pyrénées is a professional tennis tournament played on indoor hardcourts. It is currently part of the ATP Challenger Tour. It is held annually in Béarn Province, Pau, France since 2019.

== Past finals ==
=== Singles ===
Year	Champion	Runner-up	Score
2026	(Belgium) Raphaël Collignon	(France) Benjamin Bonzi	7–6^{(7–5)}, 6–1
2025	(Belgium) Raphaël Collignon	(Germany) Patrick Zahraj	6–2, 6–4
2024	(Finland) Otto Virtanen	(Switzerland) Leandro Riedi	7–5, 7–5
2023	(France) Luca Van Assche	(France) Ugo Humbert	7–6^{(7–5)}, 4–6, 7–6^{(8–6)}
2022	(France) Quentin Halys	(Canada) Vasek Pospisil	4–6, 6–4, 6–3
2021	(Moldova) Radu Albot	(Czech Republic) Jiří Lehečka	6–2, 7–6^{(7–5)}
2020	(Latvia) Ernests Gulbis	(Poland) Jerzy Janowicz	6–3, 6–4
2019	(Kazakhstan) Alexander Bublik	(Slovakia) Norbert Gombos	5–7, 6–3, 6–3

=== Doubles ===
Year	Champions	Runners-up	Score
2026	(India) Sriram Balaji (Austria) Neil Oberleitner	(Switzerland) Jakub Paul (Czech Republic) Matěj Vocel	1–6, 6–3, [13–11]
2025	(Germany) Jakob Schnaitter (Germany) Mark Wallner	(Belgium) Alexander Blockx (Belgium) Raphaël Collignon	6–4, 6–7^{(5–7)}, [10–8]
2024	(United States) Christian Harrison (United States) Brandon Nakashima	(Monaco) Romain Arneodo (Austria) Sam Weissborn	7–6^{(7–5)}, 6–4
2023	(France) Dan Added (France) Albano Olivetti	(United Kingdom) Julian Cash (Germany) Constantin Frantzen	3–6, 6–1, [10–8]
2022	(France) Albano Olivetti (Spain) David Vega Hernández	(Poland) Karol Drzewiecki (Poland) Kacper Żuk	Walkover
2021	(Monaco) Romain Arneodo (Austria) Tristan-Samuel Weissborn	(Pakistan) Aisam-ul-Haq Qureshi (Spain) David Vega Hernández	6–4, 6–2
2020	(France) Benjamin Bonzi (France) Antoine Hoang	(Italy) Simone Bolelli (Romania) Florin Mergea	6–3, 6–2
2019	(United Kingdom) Scott Clayton (Canada) Adil Shamasdin	(Netherlands) Sander Arends (Austria) Tristan-Samuel Weissborn	7–6^{(7–4)}, 5–7, [10–8]
