= 2017 Brest Challenger – Singles =

Singles
- 2017 Brest Challenger

Final
- Champion: (France) Corentin Moutet
- Runner-up: (Greece) Stefanos Tsitsipas
- Score: 6–2, 7–6^{(10–8)}

Events
Singles	Doubles
← 2016 ·	Brest Challenger	· 2018 →

Norbert Gombos was the defending champion but lost in the first round to Corentin Moutet.

Moutet won the title after defeating Stefanos Tsitsipas 6–2, 7–6^{(10–8)} in the final.

== Seeds ==
1. (Russia) Daniil Medvedev (quarterfinals)
2. (Romania) Marius Copil (semifinals)
3. (Slovakia) Norbert Gombos (first round)
4. (France) Jérémy Chardy (quarterfinals)
5. (Tunisia) Malek Jaziri (first round)
6. (Serbia) Laslo Đere (second round)
7. (Russia) Andrey Kuznetsov (first round)
8. (Italy) Matteo Berrettini (second round)

== Draw ==
=== Key ===
- Q = Qualifier
- WC = Wild card
- LL = Lucky loser
- Alt = Alternate
- SE = Special exempt
- PR = Protected ranking
- ITF = ITF entry
- JE = Junior exempt
- w/o = Walkover
- r = Retired
- d = Defaulted
- SR = Special ranking

=== Finals ===
Semifinals
(Germany) Yannick Maden	6	6^{2}	4
WC	(France) Corentin Moutet	4	7^{7}	6
SE	(Greece) Stefanos Tsitsipas	7^{7}	7^{7}
2	(Romania) Marius Copil	6^{2}	6^{3}

Final
WC	(France) Corentin Moutet	6	7^{10}
SE	(Greece) Stefanos Tsitsipas	2	6^{8}

=== Top half ===
First round
1	(Russia) D Medvedev	4	6	6
SE	(Italy) M Donati	6	1	3
(France) B Bonzi	4	7	6
(Belgium) A De Greef	6	5	3
(Germany) Y Hanfmann	6	4	4
(France) M Bourgue	3	6	6
(Germany) Y Maden	7^{7}	6
5	(Tunisia) M Jaziri	6^{4}	4
3	(Slovakia) N Gombos	6	4	1
WC	(France) C Moutet	4	6	6
Q	(Ukraine) I Marchenko	5	3
Q	(France) T Lamasine	7	6
Alt	(France) G Sakharov	6	6
WC	(France) D Guez	2	4
WC	(France) G Blancaneaux	4	6	1
6	(Serbia) L Đere	6	3	6

Second round
1	(Russia) D Medvedev	6	3	7^{7}
(France) B Bonzi	4	6	6^{2}
(France) M Bourgue	4	2
(Germany) Y Maden	6	6
WC	(France) C Moutet	6	6^{6}	6
Q	(France) T Lamasine	4	7^{8}	3
Alt	(France) G Sakharov	4	6	6
6	(Serbia) L Đere	6	2	2

Quarterfinals
1	(Russia) D Medvedev	6^{1}	4
(Germany) Y Maden	7^{7}	6
WC	(France) C Moutet	6	6
Alt	(France) G Sakharov	3	1

Semifinals
(Germany) Y Maden	6	6^{2}	4
WC	(France) C Moutet	4	7^{7}	6

=== Bottom half ===
First round
7	(Russia) A Kuznetsov	1	3
SE	(Greece) S Tsitsipas	6	6
(Belarus) U Ignatik	4	1
(Italy) S Caruso	6	6
(Russia) A Vatutin	6	2	1
(Italy) A Giannessi	4	6	6
LL	(Italy) A Arnaboldi	3	2
4	(France) J Chardy	6	6
8	(Italy) M Berrettini	6	4	7^{7}
(Russia) K Kravchuk	4	6	6^{3}
Q	(France) G Mina	6	6^{3}	2
WC	(France) U Humbert	3	7^{7}	6
(Bosnia and Herzegovina) A Šetkić	6	6^{6}	4
(Italy) L Vanni	2	7^{8}	6
Q	(Belgium) Y Reuter	3	4
2	(Romania) M Copil	6	6

Second round
SE	(Greece) S Tsitsipas	6	6
(Italy) S Caruso	3	3
(Italy) A Giannessi	1	1
4	(France) J Chardy	6	6
8	(Italy) M Berrettini	3	0
WC	(France) U Humbert	6	6
(Italy) L Vanni	6^{2}	1
2	(Romania) M Copil	7^{7}	6

Quarterfinals
SE	(Greece) S Tsitsipas	7^{7}	6
4	(France) J Chardy	6^{5}	4
WC	(France) U Humbert	4	4
2	(Romania) M Copil	6	6

Semifinals
SE	(Greece) S Tsitsipas	7^{7}	7^{7}
2	(Romania) M Copil	6^{2}	6^{3}
