= 2019 Brest Challenger – Doubles =

Doubles
- 2019 Brest Challenger

Final
- Champions: (Ukraine) Denys Molchanov (Belarus) Andrei Vasilevski
- Runners-up: (Italy) Andrea Vavassori (Spain) David Vega Hernández
- Score: 6–3, 6–1

Events
Singles	Doubles
← 2018 ·	Brest Challenger	· 2021 →

Sander Gillé and Joran Vliegen were the defending champions but chose not to defend their title.

Denys Molchanov and Andrei Vasilevski won the title after defeating Andrea Vavassori and David Vega Hernández 6–3, 6–1 in the final.

== Seeds ==
1. (Czech Republic) Roman Jebavý / (Slovakia) Igor Zelenay (semifinals)
2. (Monaco) Romain Arneodo / (Monaco) Hugo Nys (first round)
3. (Ukraine) Denys Molchanov / (Belarus) Andrei Vasilevski (champions)
4. (United States) Nathaniel Lammons / (United States) Nicholas Monroe (first round)

== Draw ==
=== Key ===
- Q = Qualifier
- WC = Wild card
- LL = Lucky loser
- Alt = Alternate
- SE = Special exempt
- PR = Protected ranking
- ITF = ITF entry
- JE = Junior exempt
- w/o = Walkover
- r = Retired
- d = Defaulted
- SR = Special ranking

First round
1	(Czech Republic) R Jebavý (Slovakia) I Zelenay	6	6
Alt	(France) Quentin Gueydan (France) Mathis Moysan	3	2
WC	(France) D Added (France) A Olivetti	6	6
WC	(France) H Gaston (France) A Reymond	2	3
3	(Ukraine) D Molchanov (Belarus) A Vasilevski	7^{7}	7^{9}
WC	(France) C Denolly (France) A Müller	6^{4}	6^{7}
(France) H Grenier (France) M Janvier	2	1
(France) B Bonzi (France) A Hoang	6	6
(Bosnia and Herzegovina) T Brkić (Croatia) A Pavić	4	4
(France) E Benchetrit (France) M Guinard	6	6
(Czech Republic) M Gengel (Czech Republic) Z Kolář	6	6
4	(United States) N Lammons (United States) N Monroe	3	4
(Italy) A Vavassori (Spain) D Vega Hernández	6	7^{7}
(France) G Blancaneaux (Ukraine) I Marchenko	4	6^{2}
(Israel) J Erlich (South Africa) L Harris	7^{7}	7
2	(Monaco) R Arneodo (Monaco) H Nys	6^{5}	5

Quarterfinals
1	(Czech Republic) R Jebavý (Slovakia) I Zelenay	3	7	[10]
WC	(France) D Added (France) A Olivetti	6	5	[4]
3	(Ukraine) D Molchanov (Belarus) A Vasilevski	6	6
(France) B Bonzi (France) A Hoang	2	2
(France) E Benchetrit (France) M Guinard	6^{4}	3
(Czech Republic) M Gengel (Czech Republic) Z Kolář	7^{7}	6
(Italy) A Vavassori (Spain) D Vega Hernández	7^{9}	6
(Israel) J Erlich (South Africa) L Harris	6^{7}	3

Semifinals
1	(Czech Republic) R Jebavý (Slovakia) I Zelenay	7	3	[7]
3	(Ukraine) D Molchanov (Belarus) A Vasilevski	5	6	[10]
(Czech Republic) M Gengel (Czech Republic) Z Kolář	4	6^{4}
(Italy) A Vavassori (Spain) D Vega Hernández	6	7^{7}

Final
3	(Ukraine) D Molchanov (Belarus) A Vasilevski	6	6
(Italy) A Vavassori (Spain) D Vega Hernández	3	1
