= 2018 Brest Challenger – Doubles =

Men's tennis event

Doubles
- 2018 Brest Challenger

Final
- Champions: (Belgium) Sander Gillé (Belgium) Joran Vliegen
- Runners-up: (India) Leander Paes (Mexico) Miguel Ángel Reyes-Varela
- Score: 3–6, 6–4, [10–2]

Events
Singles	Doubles
← 2017 ·	Brest Challenger	· 2019 →

Sander Arends and Antonio Šančić were the defending champions but only Arends chose to defend his title, partnering Romain Arneodo. Arends lost in the quarterfinals to Simone Bolelli and Daniele Bracciali.

Sander Gillé and Joran Vliegen won the title after defeating Leander Paes and Miguel Ángel Reyes-Varela 3–6, 6–4, [10–2] in the final.

== Seeds ==
1. (India) Leander Paes / (Mexico) Miguel Ángel Reyes-Varela (final)
2. (United States) Austin Krajicek / (India) Jeevan Nedunchezhiyan (semifinals)
3. (United Kingdom) Luke Bambridge / (Brazil) Marcelo Demoliner (first round)
4. (Netherlands) Sander Arends / (Monaco) Romain Arneodo (quarterfinals)

== Draw ==
=== Key ===
- Q = Qualifier
- WC = Wild card
- LL = Lucky loser
- Alt = Alternate
- SE = Special exempt
- PR = Protected ranking
- ITF = ITF entry
- JE = Junior exempt
- w/o = Walkover
- r = Retired
- d = Defaulted
- SR = Special ranking

First round
1	(India) L Paes (Mexico) MÁ Reyes-Varela	4	6	[10]
(Spain) G Granollers (Spain) E López Pérez	6	4	[7]
WC	(France) E Benchetrit (France) G Blancaneaux	6	2	[10]
WC	(France) B Bonzi (France) C Lestienne	3	6	[4]
4	(Netherlands) S Arends (Monaco) R Arneodo	3	7	[10]
WC	(France) Jaimee Floyd Angele (France) C Denolly	6	5	[5]
(Poland) H Hurkacz (Poland) S Walków	4	6^{4}
(Italy) S Bolelli (Italy) D Bracciali	6	7^{7}
(Belgium) S Gillé (Belgium) J Vliegen	6	6
(Australia) R Junaid (Netherlands) D Pel	4	4
(France) H Nys (United Kingdom) J O'Mara	6^{5}	6	[10]
3	(United Kingdom) L Bambridge (Brazil) M Demoliner	7^{7}	3	[8]
(Italy) A Vavassori (Spain) D Vega Hernández	2	3
(Bosnia and Herzegovina) T Brkić (Croatia) A Pavić	6	6
(Italy) S Travaglia (Italy) L Vanni	3	2
2	(United States) A Krajicek (India) J Nedunchezhiyan	6	6

Quarterfinals
1	(India) L Paes (Mexico) MÁ Reyes-Varela	7^{7}	6
WC	(France) E Benchetrit (France) G Blancaneaux	6^{3}	1
4	(Netherlands) S Arends (Monaco) R Arneodo	3	1
(Italy) S Bolelli (Italy) D Bracciali	6	6
(Belgium) S Gillé (Belgium) J Vliegen	6	6
(France) H Nys (United Kingdom) J O'Mara	4	4
(Bosnia and Herzegovina) T Brkić (Croatia) A Pavić	7	3	[5]
2	(United States) A Krajicek (India) J Nedunchezhiyan	5	6	[10]

Semifinals
1	(India) L Paes (Mexico) MÁ Reyes-Varela	7	7^{7}
(Italy) S Bolelli (Italy) D Bracciali	5	6^{5}
(Belgium) S Gillé (Belgium) J Vliegen	6	6
2	(United States) A Krajicek (India) J Nedunchezhiyan	2	4

Final
1	(India) L Paes (Mexico) MÁ Reyes-Varela	6	4	[2]
(Belgium) S Gillé (Belgium) J Vliegen	3	6	[10]
