= 2022 Brest Challenger – Singles =

Singles
- 2022 Brest Challenger

Final
- Champion: (France) Grégoire Barrère
- Runner-up: (France) Luca Van Assche
- Score: 6–3, 6–3

Events
Singles	Doubles
← 2021 ·	Brest Challenger	· 2023 →

Brandon Nakashima was the defending champion but chose not to defend his title.

Grégoire Barrère won the title after defeating Luca Van Assche 6–3, 6–3 in the final.

== Seeds ==
1. (France) Benjamin Bonzi (second round, withdrew)
2. (Portugal) Nuno Borges (second round)
3. (France) Grégoire Barrère (champion)
4. (France) Hugo Grenier (first round)
5. (Netherlands) Jelle Sels (quarterfinals)
6. (Italy) Matteo Arnaldi (second round)
7. (France) Geoffrey Blancaneaux (quarterfinals)
8. (France) Manuel Guinard (quarterfinals)

== Draw ==
=== Key ===
- Q = Qualifier
- WC = Wild card
- LL = Lucky loser
- Alt = Alternate
- SE = Special exempt
- PR = Protected ranking
- ITF = ITF entry
- JE = Junior exempt
- w/o = Walkover
- r = Retired
- d = Defaulted
- SR = Special ranking

=== Finals ===
Semifinals
Q	(France) Mathias Bourgue	4	2
3	(France) Grégoire Barrère	6	6
Q	Evgeny Donskoy	4	6^{6}
(France) Luca Van Assche	6	7^{8}

Final
3	(France) Grégoire Barrère	6	6
(France) Luca Van Assche	3	3

=== Top half ===
First round
1	(France) B Bonzi	7	7
(Brazil) G Décamps	5	5
Q	(France) M Bourgue	6	5	6
(France) H Mayot	0	7	2
(France) B Paire	7^{7}	6
Q	(Croatia) D Ajduković	6^{5}	3
(France) E Furness	5	4
5	(Netherlands) J Sels	7	6
3	(France) G Barrère	6^{7}	6	7
(Bulgaria) D Kuzmanov	7^{9}	4	5
Q	(France) T Lamasine	7^{7}	6^{2}	4
LL	(Kazakhstan) B Zhukayev	6^{5}	7^{7}	6
(France) G Simon	6	6
(France) L Lokoli	2	4
(Croatia) N Serdarušić	1	2
6	(Italy) M Arnaldi	6	6

Second round
1	(France) B Bonzi
Q	(France) M Bourgue	w/o
(France) B Paire	6^{3}	0^{r}
5	(Netherlands) J Sels	7^{7}	1
3	(France) G Barrère	6	6
LL	(Kazakhstan) B Zhukayev	2	4
(France) G Simon	6	6
6	(Italy) M Arnaldi	2	2

Quarterfinals
Q	(France) M Bourgue	6^{1}	7^{7}	6
5	(Netherlands) J Sels	7^{7}	6^{4}	1
3	(France) G Barrère	w/o
(France) G Simon

Semifinals
Q	(France) M Bourgue	4	2
3	(France) G Barrère	6	6

=== Bottom half ===
First round
8	(France) M Guinard	7^{7}	7
WC	(France) T Droguet	6^{4}	5
Q	(France) K de Schepper	6	3	7^{7}
Q	(France) S Gueymard Wayenburg	3	6	6^{5}
WC	(France) A Fils	6^{6}	6	6
(Italy) G Mager	7^{8}	4	4
Q	E Donskoy	6	3	6
4	(France) H Grenier	4	6	4
7	(France) G Blancaneaux	6	7^{7}
WC	(France) G Debru	1	6^{4}
LL	(Norway) V Durasovic	7^{7}	3	4
Alt	(Finland) O Virtanen	6^{4}	6	6
(France) L Van Assche	6	6
(Czech Republic) Z Kolář	2	2
Alt	A Vatutin	6	4	4
2	(Portugal) N Borges	3	6	6

Second round
8	(France) M Guinard	6	7^{7}
Q	(France) K de Schepper	4	6^{4}
WC	(France) A Fils	4	7^{7}	4
Q	E Donskoy	6	6^{5}	6
7	(France) G Blancaneaux	7^{7}	6
Alt	(Finland) O Virtanen	6^{2}	1
(France) L Van Assche	6	3	7
2	(Portugal) N Borges	4	6	5

Quarterfinals
8	(France) M Guinard	6^{5}	6	3
Q	E Donskoy	7^{7}	3	6
7	(France) G Blancaneaux	2	4
(France) L Van Assche	6	6

Semifinals
Q	E Donskoy	4	6^{6}
(France) L Van Assche	6	7^{8}
