= 2022 Brest Challenger =

- Date: 24–30 October
- Edition: 7th
- Surface: Hard (Indoor)
- Location: Brest, France

Champions

Singles
- (France) Grégoire Barrère

Doubles
- (Norway) Viktor Durasovic / (Finland) Otto Virtanen
← 2021 ·	Brest Challenger	· 2023 →

The 2022 Brest Challenger was a professional tennis tournament played on hard courts. It was the seventh edition of the tournament which was part of the 2022 ATP Challenger Tour. It took place in Brest, France between 24 and 30 October 2022.

== Singles main-draw entrants ==
=== Seeds ===
Country	Player	Rank^{1}	Seed
FRA	Benjamin Bonzi	63	1
POR	Nuno Borges	94	2
FRA	Grégoire Barrère	111	3
FRA	Hugo Grenier	116	4
NED	Jelle Sels	140	5
ITA	Matteo Arnaldi	141	6
FRA	Geoffrey Blancaneaux	147	7
FRA	Manuel Guinard	148	8

- ^{1} Rankings are as of 17 October 2022.

=== Other entrants ===
The following players received wildcards into the singles main draw:

- (France) Gabriel Debru
- (France) Titouan Droguet
- (France) Arthur Fils

The following players received entry into the singles main draw as alternates:

- Alexey Vatutin
- (Finland) Otto Virtanen
- (Kazakhstan) ~~Denis Yevseyev~~

The following players received entry from the qualifying draw:

- (Croatia) Duje Ajduković
- (France) Mathias Bourgue
- (France) Kenny de Schepper
- Evgeny Donskoy
- (France) Sascha Gueymard Wayenburg
- (France) Tristan Lamasine

The following players received entry as lucky losers:

- (Norway) Viktor Durasovic
- (Kazakhstan) Beibit Zhukayev

== Champions ==
=== Singles ===
- (France) Grégoire Barrère def. (France) Luca Van Assche 6–3, 6–3.

=== Doubles ===
- (Norway) Viktor Durasovic / (Finland) Otto Virtanen def. (Sweden) Filip Bergevi / (Greece) Petros Tsitsipas 6–4, 6–4.
