= 2021 Brest Challenger – Singles =

Singles
- 2021 Brest Challenger

Final
- Champion: (United States) Brandon Nakashima
- Runner-up: (Portugal) João Sousa
- Score: 6–3, 6–3

Events
Singles	Doubles
← 2019 ·	Brest Challenger	· 2022 →

Ugo Humbert was the defending champion but chose not to defend his title.

Brandon Nakashima won the title after defeating João Sousa 6–3, 6–3 in the final.

== Seeds ==
1. (France) Arthur Rinderknech (first round)
2. (United States) Jenson Brooksby (withdrew)
3. (France) Richard Gasquet (quarterfinals, withdrew)
4. (United States) Brandon Nakashima (champion)
5. (Italy) Stefano Travaglia (second round)
6. (France) Pierre-Hugues Herbert (first round)
7. (Switzerland) Henri Laaksonen (quarterfinals)
8. (France) Hugo Gaston (second round)

== Draw ==
=== Key ===
- Q = Qualifier
- WC = Wild card
- LL = Lucky loser
- Alt = Alternate
- SE = Special exempt
- PR = Protected ranking
- ITF = ITF entry
- JE = Junior exempt
- w/o = Walkover
- r = Retired
- d = Defaulted
- SR = Special ranking

=== Finals ===
Semifinals
(France) Alexandre Müller	2	5
4	(United States) Brandon Nakashima	6	7
Alt	(France) Maxime Janvier	5	1
(Portugal) João Sousa	7	6

Final
4	(United States) Brandon Nakashima	6	6
(Portugal) João Sousa	3	3

=== Top half ===
First round
1/WC	(France) A Rinderknech	4	2
WC	(France) M Guinard	6	6
(Slovakia) F Horanský	3	3
WC	(France) L Van Assche	6	6
Q	(Kazakhstan) A Nedovyesov	3	6	6^{2}
(France) A Müller	6	3	7^{7}
(Egypt) M Safwat	4	4
5	(Italy) S Travaglia	6	6
4	(United States) B Nakashima	6	7^{7}
Q	(Hungary) Z Piros	3	6^{4}
(Spain) F Verdasco	6	4	1
(Spain) B Zapata Miralles	3	6	6
(Denmark) H Rune	6	6
(Czech Republic) Z Kolář	3	3
(United Kingdom) L Broady	1	5
7	(Switzerland) H Laaksonen	6	7

Second round
WC	(France) M Guinard	6^{4}	3
WC	(France) L Van Assche	7^{7}	6
(France) A Müller	7^{7}	1	6
5	(Italy) S Travaglia	6^{4}	6	1
4	(United States) B Nakashima	6	6
(Spain) B Zapata Miralles	4	1
(Denmark) H Rune	4	4
7	(Switzerland) H Laaksonen	6	6

Quarterfinals
WC	(France) L Van Assche	3	4
(France) A Müller	6	6
4	(United States) B Nakashima	6	7
7	(Switzerland) H Laaksonen	1	5

Semifinals
(France) A Müller	2	5
4	(United States) B Nakashima	6	7

=== Bottom half ===
First round
8	(France) H Gaston	6	6
(Italy) S Caruso	3	4
LL	(France) V Royer	6	5	0
Alt	(France) M Janvier	3	7	6
(Italy) T Fabbiano	7^{7}	7
Q	(Russia) A Vatutin	6^{4}	5
(Czech Republic) J Lehečka	2	4
3	(France) R Gasquet	6	6
6	(France) P-H Herbert	4	6	3
(Italy) F Gaio	6	3	6
(Portugal) F Ferreira Silva	4	6	6
(France) A Hoang	6	4	4
(Portugal) J Sousa	6	6
(France) H Grenier	4	1
SE	(Spain) C Taberner	6^{5}	6^{5}
Q	(France) K de Schepper	7^{7}	7^{7}

Second round
8	(France) H Gaston	6^{5}	6	4
Alt	(France) M Janvier	7^{7}	2	6
(Italy) T Fabbiano	2	6	2
3	(France) R Gasquet	6	4	6
(Italy) F Gaio	4	7^{7}	6
(Portugal) F Ferreira Silva	6	6^{3}	2
(Portugal) J Sousa	6	7^{8}
Q	(France) K de Schepper	4	6^{6}

Quarterfinals
Alt	(France) M Janvier	w/o
3	(France) R Gasquet
(Italy) F Gaio	3	7^{7}	6^{5}
(Portugal) J Sousa	6	6^{5}	7^{7}

Semifinals
Alt	(France) M Janvier	5	1
(Portugal) J Sousa	7	6
