= 2018 Brest Challenger – Singles =

Singles
- 2018 Brest Challenger

Final
- Champion: (Poland) Hubert Hurkacz
- Runner-up: (Lithuania) Ričardas Berankis
- Score: 7–5, 6–1

Events
Singles	Doubles
- Brest Challenger

Corentin Moutet was the defending champion but lost in the second round to Julien Benneteau.

Hubert Hurkacz won the title after defeating Ričardas Berankis 7–5, 6–1 in the final.

== Seeds ==
1. (France) Julien Benneteau (quarterfinals)
2. (Spain) Jaume Munar (quarterfinals)
3. (Spain) Roberto Carballés Baena (semifinals)
4. (Poland) Hubert Hurkacz (champion)
5. (Czech Republic) Jiří Veselý (second round)
6. (France) Ugo Humbert (withdrew)
7. (Italy) Lorenzo Sonego (quarterfinals)
8. (United States) Michael Mmoh (first round)

== Draw ==
Key

- Q = Qualifier
- WC = Wild card
- LL = Lucky loser
- Alt = Alternate
- ITF = ITF entry
- PR = Protected ranking
- SR = Special ranking
- SE = Special exempt
- JE = Junior exempt
- JR = Junior Accelerator Programme entrant
- CO = College Accelerator Programme entrant
- NG = Next Gen Accelerator Program entrant
- w/o = Walkover
- r = Retired
- d = Defaulted

=== Finals ===
Semifinals
(Italy) Stefano Travaglia	6^{1}	2^{r}
4	(Poland) Hubert Hurkacz	7^{7}	4
3	(Spain) Roberto Carballés Baena	2	2
(Lithuania) Ričardas Berankis	6	6

Final
4	(Poland) Hubert Hurkacz	7	6
(Lithuania) Ričardas Berankis	5	1

=== Top half ===
First round
1	(France) J Benneteau	6	6
(Germany) M Moraing	4	3
(France) C Moutet	3	6	6
(Italy) L Vanni	6	2	3
SE	(Italy) F Baldi	4	4
(Italy) S Travaglia	6	6
(France) S Robert	4	6	2
5	(Czech Republic) J Veselý	6	3	6
4	(Poland) H Hurkacz	7^{7}	6
WC	(France) A Hoang	6^{1}	3
Q	(France) C Hemery	3	7	6
(France) G Barrère	6	5	3
Q	(France) B Bonzi	6	6
(Spain) E López Pérez	3	1
Q	(France) TK Wang	6	7^{7}
LL	(Bosnia and Herzegovina) T Brkić	2	6^{3}

Second round
1	(France) J Benneteau	7	6
(France) C Moutet	5	4
(Italy) S Travaglia	6^{4}	6	7
5	(Czech Republic) J Veselý	7^{7}	2	5
4	(Poland) H Hurkacz	6	3	6
Q	(France) C Hemery	1	6	3
Q	(France) B Bonzi	7^{7}	6
Q	(France) TK Wang	6^{2}	4

Quarterfinals
1	(France) J Benneteau	6^{4}	3
(Italy) S Travaglia	7^{7}	6
4	(Poland) H Hurkacz	6	7^{7}
Q	(France) B Bonzi	2	6^{2}

Semifinals
(Italy) S Travaglia	6^{1}	2^{r}
4	(Poland) H Hurkacz	7^{7}	4

=== Bottom half ===
First round
7	(Italy) L Sonego	7	6
(Germany) Y Maden	5	2
(Sweden) E Ymer	6	6
Q	(Russia) I Gakhov	3	2
WC	(France) Antoine Cornut-Chauvinc	6	6
SE	(France) G Sakharov	3	2
(France) N Mahut	6	6^{6}	3
3	(Spain) R Carballés Baena	0	7^{8}	6
8	(United States) M Mmoh	2	4
(Lithuania) R Berankis	6	6
(France) Q Halys	4	7^{7}	6
(Italy) S Bolelli	6	6^{5}	3
WC	(France) C Denolly	6	7^{7}
WC	(France) M Martineau	2	6^{5}
(France) C Lestienne	1	3
2	(Spain) J Munar	6	6

Second round
7	(Italy) L Sonego	7^{7}	6
(Sweden) E Ymer	6^{1}	3
WC	(France) A Cornut-Chauvinc	3	5
3	(Spain) R Carballés Baena	6	7
(Lithuania) R Berankis	6	6
(France) Q Halys	2	2
WC	(France) C Denolly	2	2
2	(Spain) J Munar	6	6

Quarterfinals
7	(Italy) L Sonego	4	6	4
3	(Spain) R Carballés Baena	6	2	6
(Lithuania) R Berankis	6	6
2	(Spain) J Munar	3	4

Semifinals
3	(Spain) R Carballés Baena	2	2
(Lithuania) R Berankis	6	6
