= 2015 Brest Challenger – Doubles =

Doubles
- 2015 Brest Challenger

Final
- Champions: (Netherlands) Wesley Koolhof; (Netherlands) Matwé Middelkoop
- Runners-up: (United Kingdom) Ken Skupski; (United Kingdom) Neal Skupski
- Score: 3–6, 6–4, [10–6]

Events
Singles	Doubles
Brest Challenger	· 2016 →

This was the first edition of the tournament, Wesley Koolhof and Matwé Middelkoop won the title defeating Ken Skupski and Neal Skupski in the final 3–6, 6–4, [10–6].

== Seeds ==
1. (Netherlands) Wesley Koolhof / (Netherlands) Matwé Middelkoop (champions)
2. (United Kingdom) Ken Skupski / (United Kingdom) Neal Skupski (final)
3. (Serbia) Ilija Bozoljac / (Croatia) Antonio Šančić (semifinals)
4. (United States) James Cerretani / (Austria) Tristan-Samuel Weissborn (quarterfinals)

== Draw ==
=== Key ===
- Q = Qualifier
- WC = Wild card
- LL = Lucky loser
- Alt = Alternate
- SE = Special exempt
- PR = Protected ranking
- ITF = ITF entry
- JE = Junior exempt
- w/o = Walkover
- r = Retired
- d = Defaulted
- SR = Special ranking

First round

Quarterfinals

Semifinals

Final

1
- (Netherlands) W Koolhof
- (Netherlands) M Middelkoop
6
6

- (France) Sebastien Boltz
- (France) G Jacq
6
6

- (France) S Boltz
- (France) G Jacq
0
3

WC
(France) R Jouan
(France) Alexandre Penaud
2
4

1
- (Netherlands) W Koolhof
- (Netherlands) M Middelkoop
6^{3}
6
[18]

- (Netherlands) I Sijsling
- (Sweden) A Siljeström
7^{7}
2
[16]

4
- (United States) J Cerretani
- (Austria) T-S Weissborn
6^{1}
2

- (Netherlands) S Arends
- (Poland) A Majchrowicz
4
6^{3}

- (Netherlands) I Sijsling
- (Sweden) A Siljeström
7^{7}
6

- (Netherlands) I Sijsling
- (Sweden) A Siljeström
6
7^{7}

1
- (Netherlands) W Koolhof
- (Netherlands) M Middelkoop
3
6
[10]

- (France) A Sidorenko
- (France) M Teixeira
4
1

2
- (United Kingdom) K Skupski
- (United Kingdom) N Skupski
6
4
[6]

(France) S Doumbia
(France) Maxime Tabatruong
6
6

(France) S Doumbia
(France) M Tabatruong
3
3

3
- (Serbia) I Bozoljac
- (Croatia) A Šančić
6
6

3
- (Serbia) I Bozoljac
- (Croatia) A Šančić
6^{4}
4

- (Uzbekistan) F Dustov
- (Italy) A Motti
6
3
[12]

2
- (United Kingdom) K Skupski
- (United Kingdom) N Skupski
7^{7}
6

- (Belgium) M Authom
- (France) D Guez
1
6
[14]

- (Belgium) M Authom
- (France) D Guez
4
2

2
- (United Kingdom) K Skupski
- (United Kingdom) N Skupski
6
6
