= 2018 Brest Challenger =

- Date: 22–28 October
- Edition: 4th
- Surface: Hard
- Location: Brest, France

Champions

Singles
- (Poland) Hubert Hurkacz

Doubles
- (Belgium) Sander Gillé / (Belgium) Joran Vliegen
← 2017 ·	Brest Challenger	· 2019 →

The 2018 Brest Challenger was a professional tennis tournament played on hard courts. It was the fourth edition of the tournament which was part of the 2018 ATP Challenger Tour. It took place in Brest, France between 22 and 28 October 2018.

== Singles main-draw entrants ==
=== Seeds ===
Country	Player	Rank^{1}	Seed
FRA	Julien Benneteau	61	1
ESP	Jaume Munar	80	2
ESP	Roberto Carballés Baena	82	3
POL	Hubert Hurkacz	88	4
CZE	Jiří Veselý	93	5
~~FRA~~	~~Ugo Humbert~~	~~99~~	~~6~~
ITA	Lorenzo Sonego	101	7
USA	Michael Mmoh	104	8

- ^{1} Rankings are as of 15 October 2018.

=== Other entrants ===
The following players received wildcards into the singles main draw:

- (France) Antoine Cornut-Chauvinc
- (France) Corentin Denolly
- (France) Antoine Hoang
- (France) Matteo Martineau

The following players received entry into the singles main draw as special exempts:

- (Italy) Filippo Baldi
- (France) Gleb Sakharov

The following players received entry from the qualifying draw:

- (France) Benjamin Bonzi
- (Russia) Ivan Gakhov
- (France) Calvin Hemery
- (France) Tak Khunn Wang

The following player received entry as a lucky loser:

- (Bosnia and Herzegovina) Tomislav Brkić

== Champions ==
=== Singles ===
- (Poland) Hubert Hurkacz def. (Lithuania) Ričardas Berankis, 7–5, 6–1.

=== Doubles ===
- (Belgium) Sander Gillé / (Belgium) Joran Vliegen def. (India) Leander Paes / (Mexico) Miguel Ángel Reyes-Varela 3–6, 6–4, [10–2].
