= 2016 Brest Challenger – Doubles =

Doubles
- 2016 Brest Challenger

Final
- Champions: (Netherlands) Sander Arends (Poland) Mateusz Kowalczyk
- Runners-up: (Switzerland) Marco Chiudinelli (Italy) Luca Vanni
- Score: 6–7^{(2–7)}, 6–3, [10–5]

Events
| Singles | Doubles |
| ← 2015 · | Brest Challenger | · 2017 → |

Wesley Koolhof and Matwé Middelkoop were the defending champions but chose not to defend their title.

Sander Arends and Mateusz Kowalczyk won the title after defeating Marco Chiudinelli and Luca Vanni 6–7^{(2–7)}, 6–3, [10–5] in the final.

== Seeds ==
1. (United States) James Cerretani / (Austria) Philipp Oswald (first round)
2. (Netherlands) Sander Arends / (Poland) Mateusz Kowalczyk (champions)
3. (Italy) Riccardo Ghedin / (Croatia) Dino Marcan (semifinals)
4. (Kazakhstan) Andrey Golubev / (Austria) Tristan-Samuel Weissborn (quarterfinals)

== Draw ==
=== Key ===
- Q = Qualifier
- WC = Wild card
- LL = Lucky loser
- Alt = Alternate
- SE = Special exempt
- PR = Protected ranking
- ITF = ITF entry
- JE = Junior exempt
- w/o = Walkover
- r = Retired
- d = Defaulted
- SR = Special ranking

First round
1 | (United States) J Cerretani (Austria) P Oswald | 4 | 4
(Switzerland) M Chiudinelli (Italy) L Vanni | 6 | 6
(Netherlands) M Vervoort (Serbia) Ilija Vučić | 3 | 6 | [9]
WC | (France) G Jacq (France) C Moutet | 6 | 2 | [11]
4 | (Kazakhstan) A Golubev (Austria) T-S Weissborn | 6 | 3 | [11]
(Serbia) P Krstin (Kazakhstan) A Nedovyesov | 3 | 6 | [9]
(Belgium) S Gillé (Belgium) J Vliegen | 3 | 6 | [10]
WC | (France) E Furness (France) R Jouan | 6 | 2 | [6]
Alt | (Austria) M Neuchrist (Netherlands) D Pel | 6 | 7^{8}
(Canada) S Diez (Serbia) N Milojević | 2 | 6^{6}
(Bosnia and Herzegovina) A Šetkić (Serbia) M Tepavac | 3 | 1
3 | (Italy) R Ghedin (Croatia) D Marcan | 6 | 6
WC | (France) C Denolly (France) M Janvier | 6^{5} | 7^{7} | [14]
(Poland) T Bednarek (Australia) R Junaid | 7^{7} | 6^{2} | [12]
(Czech Republic) R Jebavý (Slovakia) L Lacko | 3 | 4
2 | (Netherlands) S Arends (Poland) M Kowalczyk | 6 | 6

Quarterfinals
(Switzerland) M Chiudinelli (Italy) L Vanni | 7^{7} | 6
WC | (France) G Jacq (France) C Moutet | 6^{5} | 4
4 | (Kazakhstan) A Golubev (Austria) T-S Weissborn | 6^{3} | 2
(Belgium) S Gillé (Belgium) J Vliegen | 7^{7} | 6
Alt | (Austria) M Neuchrist (Netherlands) D Pel | 4 | 4
3 | (Italy) R Ghedin (Croatia) D Marcan | 6 | 6
WC | (France) C Denolly (France) M Janvier
2 | (Netherlands) S Arends (Poland) M Kowalczyk | w/o

Semifinals
(Switzerland) M Chiudinelli (Italy) L Vanni | 6 | 6
(Belgium) S Gillé (Belgium) J Vliegen | 3 | 2
3 | (Italy) R Ghedin (Croatia) D Marcan | 1 | 4
2 | (Netherlands) S Arends (Poland) M Kowalczyk | 6 | 6

Final
(Switzerland) M Chiudinelli (Italy) L Vanni | 7^{7} | 3 | [5]
2 | (Netherlands) S Arends (Poland) M Kowalczyk | 6^{2} | 6 | [10]
