= 2019 Brest Challenger – Singles =

Singles
- 2019 Brest Challenger

Final
- Champion: (France) Ugo Humbert
- Runner-up: (Russia) Evgeny Donskoy
- Score: 6–2, 6–3

Events
Singles	Doubles
- Brest Challenger

Hubert Hurkacz was the defending champion but chose not to defend his title.

Ugo Humbert won the title after defeating Evgeny Donskoy 6–2, 6–3 in the final.

== Seeds ==
All seeds receive a bye into the second round.

1. (France) Ugo Humbert (champion)
2. (Spain) Roberto Carballés Baena (quarterfinals)
3. (Italy) Thomas Fabbiano (second round)
4. (France) Corentin Moutet (third round)
5. (Spain) Jaume Munar (third round)
6. (South Africa) Lloyd Harris (semifinals)
7. (France) Antoine Hoang (quarterfinals)
8. (Russia) Evgeny Donskoy (final)
9. (Slovakia) Norbert Gombos (semifinals)
10. (Italy) Paolo Lorenzi (second round)
11. (Germany) Yannick Maden (second round)
12. (Czech Republic) Jiří Veselý (third round)
13. (Japan) Yūichi Sugita (second round)
14. (Spain) Guillermo García López (third round)
15. (France) Enzo Couacaud (second round)
16. (France) Quentin Halys (second round)

== Draw ==
Key

- Q = Qualifier
- WC = Wild card
- LL = Lucky loser
- Alt = Alternate
- ITF = ITF entry
- PR = Protected ranking
- SR = Special ranking
- SE = Special exempt
- JE = Junior exempt
- JR = Junior Accelerator Programme entrant
- CO = College Accelerator Programme entrant
- NG = Next Gen Accelerator Program entrant
- w/o = Walkover
- r = Retired
- d = Defaulted

=== Finals ===
Quarterfinals
1/SE	(France) Ugo Humbert	6	4	7
7	(France) Antoine Hoang	4	6	5
Q	(Ukraine) Illya Marchenko	4	2
9	(Slovakia) Norbert Gombos	6	6
6	(South Africa) Lloyd Harris	6	7^{7}
(France) Corentin Denolly	3	6^{2}
8	(Russia) Evgeny Donskoy	7^{9}	6
2	(Spain) Roberto Carballés Baena	6^{7}	4

Semifinals
1/SE	(France) Ugo Humbert	6	7^{8}
9	(Slovakia) Norbert Gombos	4	6^{6}
6	(South Africa) Lloyd Harris	6	5	3
8	(Russia) Evgeny Donskoy	4	7	6

Final
1/SE	(France) Ugo Humbert	6	6
8	(Russia) Evgeny Donskoy	2	3

=== Top half ===
==== Section 1 ====
First round
WC	(France) A Reymond	2	1
(France) M Janvier	6	6
WC	(France) R Roumane	5	6^{3}
(Russia) E Karlovskiy	7	7^{7}
(Czech Republic) Z Kolář	7^{7}	6
(United Kingdom) J Ward	6^{3}	2
(France) A Müller	6^{5}	6^{8}
(Slovenia) B Kavčič	7^{7}	7^{10}

Second round
1/SE	(France) U Humbert	6	6
(France) M Janvier	4	1
(Russia) E Karlovskiy	6	6
15	(France) E Couacaud	2	4
10	(Italy) P Lorenzi	3	6^{1}
(Czech Republic) Z Kolář	6	7^{7}
(Slovenia) B Kavčič	6	1	2
7	(France) A Hoang	2	6	6

Third round
1/SE	(France) U Humbert	7^{7}	6
(Russia) E Karlovskiy	6^{2}	4
(Czech Republic) Z Kolář	2	6^{5}
7	(France) A Hoang	6	7^{7}

Quarterfinals
1/SE	(France) U Humbert	6	4	7
7	(France) A Hoang	4	6	5

==== Section 2 ====
First round
Q	(Ukraine) I Marchenko	6	6
(Slovakia) L Klein	4	2
(Croatia) N Serdarušić	7	6
WC	(France) G Blancaneaux	5	3
(France) T Lamasine	3	6	3
(Norway) V Durasovic	6	3	6
(France) E Benchetrit	6	7
(Russia) A Karatsev	3	5

Second round
3	(Italy) T Fabbiano	4	4
Q	(Ukraine) I Marchenko	6	6
(Croatia) N Serdarušić	6	3	7^{7}
13	(Japan) Y Sugita	1	6	6^{5}
9	(Slovakia) N Gombos	4	6	6
(Norway) V Durasovic	6	2	4
(France) E Benchetrit	3	3
5	(Spain) J Munar	6	6

Third round
Q	(Ukraine) I Marchenko	6	7^{7}
(Croatia) N Serdarušić	4	6^{4}
9	(Slovakia) N Gombos	7^{7}	6
5	(Spain) J Munar	6^{3}	3

Quarterfinals
Q	(Ukraine) I Marchenko	4	2
9	(Slovakia) N Gombos	6	6

=== Bottom half ===
==== Section 3 ====
First round
(France) H Gaston	7^{7}	6
(France) C Lestienne	6^{5}	2
(Italy) M Viola	6	6
Q	(France) M Hamou	4	3
(France) C Denolly	6	6
(Argentina) P Cachin	1	2
WC	(France) D Added	3	6^{6}
(France) M Bourgue	6	7^{8}

Second round
6	(South Africa) L Harris	7^{7}	7
(France) H Gaston	6^{3}	5
(Italy) M Viola	1	2
12	(Czech Republic) J Veselý	6	6
16/WC	(France) Q Halys	6	3	3
(France) C Denolly	3	6	6
(France) M Bourgue	2	1
4	(France) C Moutet	6	6

Third round
6	(South Africa) L Harris	6	7^{8}
12	(Czech Republic) J Veselý	1	6^{6}
(France) C Denolly	2	7	6
4	(France) C Moutet	6	5	3

Quarterfinals
6	(South Africa) L Harris	6	7^{7}
(France) C Denolly	3	6^{2}

==== Section 4 ====
First round
(Russia) T Gabashvili	7^{7}	4	6
(Austria) J Rodionov	6^{0}	6	4
(Argentina) M Trungelliti	2	3
(France) H Grenier	6	6
(Russia) P Kotov	6	6
(France) M Guinard	4	4
(Spain) C Taberner	7^{7}	2	7^{7}
(France) B Bonzi	6^{5}	6	6^{2}

Second round
8	(Russia) E Donskoy	7	6
(Russia) T Gabashvili	5	4
(France) H Grenier	7^{7}	6
11	(Germany) Y Maden	6^{4}	4
14	(Spain) G García López	6	3	6
(Russia) P Kotov	4	6	3
(Spain) C Taberner	7^{7}	0	1
2	(Spain) R Carballés Baena	6^{5}	6	6

Third round
8	(Russia) E Donskoy	6	3	6
(France) H Grenier	3	6	3
14	(Spain) G García López	5	6^{3}
2	(Spain) R Carballés Baena	7	7^{7}

Quarterfinals
8	(Russia) E Donskoy	7^{9}	6
2	(Spain) R Carballés Baena	6^{7}	4
