= 2016 Brest Challenger – Singles =

Singles
- 2016 Brest Challenger

Final
- Champion: (Slovakia) Norbert Gombos
- Runner-up: (Belgium) Yannik Reuter
- Score: 7–5, 6–2

Events
Singles	Doubles
← 2015 ·	Brest Challenger	· 2017 →

Ivan Dodig was the defending champion but chose not to defend his title.

Norbert Gombos won the title after defeating Yannik Reuter 7–5, 6–2 in the final.

== Seeds ==
1. (France) Jérémy Chardy (semifinals)
2. (Slovakia) Lukáš Lacko (quarterfinals)
3. (Switzerland) Marco Chiudinelli (second round)
4. (Italy) Alessandro Giannessi (first round)
5. (Canada) Steven Diez (quarterfinals)
6. (Italy) Luca Vanni (first round)
7. (France) Quentin Halys (withdrew)
8. (Serbia) Marko Tepavac (quarterfinals)

== Draw ==
=== Key ===
- Q = Qualifier
- WC = Wild card
- LL = Lucky loser
- Alt = Alternate
- SE = Special exempt
- PR = Protected ranking
- ITF = ITF entry
- JE = Junior exempt
- w/o = Walkover
- r = Retired
- d = Defaulted
- SR = Special ranking

=== Finals ===
Semifinals
1	(France) Jérémy Chardy	4	7	2
(Belgium) Yannik Reuter	6	5	6
(France) Julien Benneteau	6^{3}	6	4
LL	(Slovakia) Norbert Gombos	7^{7}	3	6

Final
(Belgium) Yannik Reuter	5	2
LL	(Slovakia) Norbert Gombos	7	6

=== Top half ===
First round
1	(France) J Chardy	6	6
SE	(Greece) S Tsitsipas	2	3
SE	(France) M Janvier	4	6^{4}
(Kazakhstan) A Nedovyesov	6	7^{7}
Q	(France) G Jacq	6	2
(Italy) M Donati	3	1^{r}
(Germany) Marc Sieber	4	1
5	(Canada) S Diez	6	6
4	(Italy) A Giannessi	1	6^{1}
Q	(Austria) M Neuchrist	6	7^{7}
(France) A Sidorenko	2	4
(Bosnia and Herzegovina) A Šetkić	6	6
Q	(Switzerland) Y Marti	5	6	3
(Belgium) Y Reuter	7	3	6
(Serbia) P Krstin	7^{7}	7
6	(Italy) L Vanni	6^{5}	5

Second round
1	(France) J Chardy	6	6
(Kazakhstan) A Nedovyesov	4	4
Q	(France) G Jacq	6^{4}	1
5	(Canada) S Diez	7^{7}	6
Q	(Austria) M Neuchrist	3	6	5
(Bosnia and Herzegovina) A Šetkić	6	4	7
(Belgium) Y Reuter	6	6
(Serbia) P Krstin	4	4

Quarterfinals
1	(France) J Chardy	6	6
5	(Canada) S Diez	1	2
(Bosnia and Herzegovina) A Šetkić	2	4
(Belgium) Y Reuter	6	6

Semifinals
1	(France) J Chardy	4	7	2
(Belgium) Y Reuter	6	5	6

=== Bottom half ===
First round
8	(Serbia) M Tepavac	6	6
(Kazakhstan) A Golubev	3	4
(Belgium) Y Mertens	2	0^{r}
Q	(France) R Jouan	6	1
(France) J Benneteau	6	5	6
(Serbia) N Milojević	4	7	3
WC	(France) E Furness	4	5
3	(Switzerland) M Chiudinelli	6	7
LL	(Slovakia) N Gombos	6	6
LL	(Belgium) S Gillé	4	3
(Spain) A Menéndez-Maceiras	6^{3}	4
(Germany) Jeremy Jahn	7^{7}	6
WC	(France) C Moutet	6	4	7
WC	(France) L Lokoli	1	6	5
(France) G Barrère	1	1
2	(Slovakia) L Lacko	6	6

Second round
8	(Serbia) M Tepavac	6^{7}	6	6
Q	(France) R Jouan	7^{9}	2	3
(France) J Benneteau	6	6
3	(Switzerland) M Chiudinelli	2	0
LL	(Slovakia) N Gombos	6	4	7
(Germany) J Jahn	3	6	5
WC	(France) C Moutet	2	4
2	(Slovakia) L Lacko	6	6

Quarterfinals
8	(Serbia) M Tepavac	2	1
(France) J Benneteau	6	6
LL	(Slovakia) N Gombos	3	6	7^{7}
2	(Slovakia) L Lacko	6	4	6^{5}

Semifinals
(France) J Benneteau	6^{3}	6	4
LL	(Slovakia) N Gombos	7^{7}	3	6
