= 2022 Brest Challenger – Doubles =

Doubles
- 2022 Brest Challenger

Final
- Champions: (Norway) Viktor Durasovic (Finland) Otto Virtanen
- Runners-up: (Sweden) Filip Bergevi (Greece) Petros Tsitsipas
- Score: 6–4, 6–4

Events
Singles	Doubles
← 2021 ·	Brest Challenger	· 2023 →

Sadio Doumbia and Fabien Reboul were the defending champions but lost in the semifinals to Filip Bergevi and Petros Tsitsipas.

Viktor Durasovic and Otto Virtanen won the title after defeating Bergevi and Tsitsipas 6–4, 6–4 in the final.

== Seeds ==
1. (France) Sadio Doumbia / (France) Fabien Reboul (semifinals)
2. (Portugal) Nuno Borges / (Portugal) Francisco Cabral (quarterfinals)
3. (France) Jonathan Eysseric / (Netherlands) David Pel (semifinals)
4. (United Kingdom) Jonny O'Mara / (Netherlands) Sem Verbeek (quarterfinals)

== Draw ==
=== Key ===
- Q = Qualifier
- WC = Wild card
- LL = Lucky loser
- Alt = Alternate
- ITF = ITF entry
- PR = Protected ranking
- SR = Special ranking
- SE = Special exempt
- JE = Junior exempt
- JR = Junior Accelerator Programme entrant
- CO = College Accelerator Programme entrant
- NG = Next Gen Accelerator Program entrant
- w/o = Walkover
- r = Retired
- d = Defaulted

First round
(Finland) P Niklas-Salminen (Netherlands) B Stevens	7^{7}	6
WC	(France) G Debru (France) A Fils	6^{4}	3
4	(United Kingdom) J O'Mara (Netherlands) S Verbeek	6	6
(Netherlands) S Arends (Croatia) F Škugor	4	2
(Sweden) F Bergevi (Greece) Pe Tsitsipas	2	7	[11]
(France) K Jacquet (France) H Mayot	6	5	[9]
(France) L Sanchez (Canada) K Stevenson	6	7
(France) T Arribagé (France) G Blancaneaux	4	5
(India) P Raja (India) D Sharan	2	5
3	(France) J Eysseric (Netherlands) D Pel	6	7
(Norway) V Durasovic (Finland) O Virtanen	6	3	[10]
(France) M Guinard (France) B Paire	4	6	[8]

Quarterfinals
1	(France) S Doumbia (France) F Reboul	7	7^{7}
(Finland) P Niklas-Salminen (Netherlands) B Stevens	5	6^{4}
4	(United Kingdom) J O'Mara (Netherlands) S Verbeek	3	4
(Sweden) F Bergevi (Greece) Pe Tsitsipas	6	6
(France) L Sanchez (Canada) K Stevenson	6^{5}	6	[7]
3	(France) J Eysseric (Netherlands) D Pel	7^{7}	4	[10]
(Norway) V Durasovic (Finland) O Virtanen	6	7^{7}
2	(Portugal) N Borges (Portugal) F Cabral	4	6^{4}

Semifinals
1	(France) S Doumbia (France) F Reboul	4	6^{4}
(Sweden) F Bergevi (Greece) Pe Tsitsipas	6	7^{7}
3	(France) J Eysseric (Netherlands) D Pel	4	7^{7}	[7]
(Norway) V Durasovic (Finland) O Virtanen	6	6^{3}	[10]

Final
(Sweden) F Bergevi (Greece) Pe Tsitsipas	4	4
(Norway) V Durasovic (Finland) O Virtanen	6	6
