= 2023 Brest Challenger – Doubles =

Doubles
- 2023 Brest Challenger

Final
- Champions: (India) Yuki Bhambri (United Kingdom) Julian Cash
- Runners-up: (United States) Robert Galloway (France) Albano Olivetti
- Score: 6–7^{(5–7)}, 6–3, [10–5]

Events
Singles	Doubles
← 2022 ·	Brest Challenger	· 2024 →

Viktor Durasovic and Otto Virtanen were the defending champions but only Virtanen chose to defend his title, partnering Patrik Niklas-Salminen. Virtanen lost in the first round to Evan King and Reese Stalder.

Yuki Bhambri and Julian Cash won the title after defeating Robert Galloway and Albano Olivetti 6–7^{(5–7)}, 6–3, [10–5] in the final.

== Seeds ==
1. (United States) Robert Galloway / (France) Albano Olivetti (final)
2. (India) Yuki Bhambri / (United Kingdom) Julian Cash (champions)
3. (United States) Evan King / (United States) Reese Stalder (semifinals)
4. (Netherlands) Sander Arends / (Mexico) Miguel Ángel Reyes-Varela (semifinals)

== Draw ==
=== Key ===
- Q = Qualifier
- WC = Wild card
- LL = Lucky loser
- Alt = Alternate
- ITF = ITF entry
- PR = Protected ranking
- SR = Special ranking
- SE = Special exempt
- JE = Junior exempt
- JR = Junior Accelerator Programme entrant
- CO = College Accelerator Programme entrant
- NG = Next Gen Accelerator Program entrant
- w/o = Walkover
- r = Retired
- d = Defaulted

First round
1	(United States) R Galloway (France) A Olivetti	6	6
(France) J Eysseric (France) H Mayot	3	3
(India) RC Bollipalli (India) A Kadhe	5	6	[6]
(Australia) A Harris (United States) V Kirkov	7	2	[10]
3	(United States) E King (United States) R Stalder	6^{6}	6	[10]
(Finland) P Niklas-Salminen (Finland) O Virtanen	7^{8}	4	[6]
WC	(Canada) G Diallo (United Kingdom) A Fery
(Poland) K Drzewiecki; I Liutarevich	w/o
(United Kingdom) L Johnson (Tunisia) S Mansouri	6^{4}	6	[10]
(France) T Arribagé (France) L Sanchez	7^{7}	3	[8]
WC	(France) G Blancaneaux (France) C Hemery	5	7^{7}	[1]
4	(Netherlands) S Arends (Mexico) MÁ Reyes-Varela	7	6^{3}	[10]
(Spain) S Martos Gornés (Spain) D Vega Hernández	6^{3}	4
(Pakistan) A-u-H Qureshi (Greece) Pe Tsitsipas	7^{7}	6
(India) A Chandrasekar (India) VS Prashanth	4	2
2	(India) Y Bhambri (United Kingdom) J Cash	6	6

Quarterfinals
1	(United States) R Galloway (France) A Olivetti	7^{11}	6
(Australia) A Harris (United States) V Kirkov	6^{9}	3
3	(United States) E King (United States) R Stalder	7	6
(Poland) K Drzewiecki; I Liutarevich	5	2
(United Kingdom) L Johnson (Tunisia) S Mansouri	4	6	[9]
4	(Netherlands) S Arends (Mexico) MÁ Reyes-Varela	6	3	[11]
(Pakistan) A-u-H Qureshi (Greece) Pe Tsitsipas	4	7^{8}	[7]
2	(India) Y Bhambri (United Kingdom) J Cash	6	6^{6}	[10]

Semifinals
1	(United States) R Galloway (France) A Olivetti	6	6
3	(United States) E King (United States) R Stalder	4	0
4	(Netherlands) S Arends (Mexico) MÁ Reyes-Varela	3	7^{10}	[7]
2	(India) Y Bhambri (United Kingdom) J Cash	6	6^{8}	[10]

Final
1	(United States) R Galloway (France) A Olivetti	7^{7}	3	[5]
2	(India) Y Bhambri (United Kingdom) J Cash	6^{5}	6	[10]
