= 2021 Brest Challenger – Doubles =

Doubles
- 2021 Brest Challenger

Final
- Champions: (France) Sadio Doumbia (France) Fabien Reboul
- Runners-up: (Italy) Salvatore Caruso (Italy) Federico Gaio
- Score: 4–6, 6–3, [10–3]

Events
Singles	Doubles
← 2019 ·	Brest Challenger	· 2022 →

Denys Molchanov and Andrei Vasilevski were the defending champions but only Molchanov chose to defend his title, partnering Aleksandr Nedovyesov. Molchanov lost in the semifinals to Sadio Doumbia and Fabien Reboul.

Doumbia and Reboul won the title after defeating Salvatore Caruso and Federico Gaio 4–6, 6–3, [10–3].

== Seeds ==
1. (Ukraine) Denys Molchanov / (Kazakhstan) Aleksandr Nedovyesov (semifinals)
2. (France) Albano Olivetti / (Australia) Matt Reid (first round)
3. (Czech Republic) Zdeněk Kolář / (Spain) David Vega Hernández (semifinals)
4. (France) Sadio Doumbia / (France) Fabien Reboul (champions)

== Draw ==
=== Key ===
- Q = Qualifier
- WC = Wild card
- LL = Lucky loser
- Alt = Alternate
- ITF = ITF entry
- PR = Protected ranking
- SR = Special ranking
- SE = Special exempt
- JE = Junior exempt
- JR = Junior Accelerator Programme entrant
- CO = College Accelerator Programme entrant
- NG = Next Gen Accelerator Program entrant
- w/o = Walkover
- r = Retired
- d = Defaulted

First round
1	(Ukraine) D Molchanov (Kazakhstan) A Nedovyesov	6	7
(India) S Balaji (India) D Sharan	3	5
(Portugal) F Ferreira Silva (Portugal) J Sousa	4	6	[10]
PR	(Portugal) F Cabral (United Kingdom) E Hoyt	6	1	[5]
4	(France) S Doumbia (France) F Reboul	6	6
(France) M Guinard (France) A Hoang	0	3
(Sweden) DN Mădăraș (Russia) A Vatutin	3	4
(United Kingdom) L Broady (United Kingdom) L Johnson	6	6
(France) M Martineau (Hungary) Z Piros	4	5
(France) H Grenier (France) A Müller	6	7
(United States) J Cerretani (Germany) F Fallert	6^{3}	3
3	(Czech Republic) Z Kolář (Spain) D Vega Hernández	7^{7}	6
(Tunisia) A Dougaz (Egypt) M Safwat	3	4
(Italy) S Caruso (Italy) F Gaio	6	6
(United States) N Monroe (United States) B Nakashima	6	6
2	(France) A Olivetti (Australia) M Reid	4	4

Quarterfinals
1	(Ukraine) D Molchanov (Kazakhstan) A Nedovyesov	6	5	[11]
(Portugal) F Ferreira Silva (Portugal) J Sousa	2	7	[9]
4	(France) S Doumbia (France) F Reboul	4	7^{9}	[10]
(United Kingdom) L Broady (United Kingdom) L Johnson	6	6^{7}	[7]
(France) H Grenier (France) A Müller	4	1
3	(Czech Republic) Z Kolář (Spain) D Vega Hernández	6	6
(Italy) S Caruso (Italy) F Gaio	7	3	[10]
(United States) N Monroe (United States) B Nakashima	5	6	[6]

Semifinals
1	(Ukraine) D Molchanov (Kazakhstan) A Nedovyesov	6^{12}	2
4	(France) S Doumbia (France) F Reboul	7^{14}	6
3	(Czech Republic) Z Kolář (Spain) D Vega Hernández	5	5
(Italy) S Caruso (Italy) F Gaio	7	7

Final
4	(France) S Doumbia (France) F Reboul	4	6	[10]
(Italy) S Caruso (Italy) F Gaio	6	3	[3]
