= 2024 Brest Challenger – Doubles =

Doubles
- 2024 Brest Challenger

Final
- Champions: (Colombia) Nicolás Barrientos (Tunisia) Skander Mansouri
- Runners-up: (Switzerland) Jakub Paul (Czech Republic) Matěj Vocel
- Score: 7–5, 4–6, [10–5]

Events
Singles	Doubles
← 2023 ·	Brest Challenger	· 2025 →

Yuki Bhambri and Julian Cash were the defending champions but chose not to defend their title.

Nicolás Barrientos and Skander Mansouri won the title after defeating Jakub Paul and Matěj Vocel 7–5, 4–6, [10–5] in the final.

== Seeds ==
1. (Argentina) Guido Andreozzi / (India) Sriram Balaji (first round)
2. (Colombia) Nicolás Barrientos / (Tunisia) Skander Mansouri (champions)
3. (Portugal) Francisco Cabral / (Mexico) Miguel Ángel Reyes-Varela (first round)
4. (Germany) Jakob Schnaitter / (Germany) Mark Wallner (first round)

== Draw ==
=== Key ===
- Q = Qualifier
- WC = Wild card
- LL = Lucky loser
- Alt = Alternate
- ITF = ITF entry
- PR = Protected ranking
- SR = Special ranking
- SE = Special exempt
- JE = Junior exempt
- JR = Junior Accelerator Programme entrant
- CO = College Accelerator Programme entrant
- NG = Next Gen Accelerator Program entrant
- w/o = Walkover
- r = Retired
- d = Defaulted

=== Draw ===
First round
1	(Argentina) G Andreozzi (India) S Balaji	1	6	[6]
(Switzerland) J Paul (Czech Republic) M Vocel	6	4	[10]
(France) J Eysseric (Netherlands) D Pel	7^{7}	7^{9}
(Lithuania) E Butvilas (Jordan) A Shelbayh	6^{2}	6^{7}
3	(Portugal) F Cabral (Mexico) M Reyes-Varela	2	5
(Brazil) M Demoliner (United States) C Harrison	6	7
(France) G Blancaneaux (France) M Guinard	4	6	[6]
WC	(France) M Kouamé (France) T Lamasine	6	3	[10]
Alt	(France) A Géa (United States) Em Nava	6^{4}	6	[12]
(Israel) D Cukierman (Denmark) J Ingildsen	7^{7}	1	[10]
(France) T Droguet (France) M Martineau	6	7^{7}
4	(Germany) J Schnaitter (Germany) M Wallner	4	6^{3}
(Sweden) F Bergevi (Netherlands) M Veldheer	7^{7}	3	[3]
(France) G Jacq (France) L Sanchez	6^{1}	6	[10]
Alt	E Gerasimov; A Kachmazov	3	6^{8}
2	(Colombia) N Barrientos (Tunisia) S Mansouri	6	7^{10}

Quarterfinals
(Switzerland) J Paul (Czech Republic) M Vocel	7	6
(France) J Eysseric (Netherlands) D Pel	5	4
(Brazil) M Demoliner (United States) C Harrison	4	6^{4}
WC	(France) M Kouamé (France) T Lamasine	6	7^{7}
Alt	(France) A Géa (United States) Em Nava	7	4	[3]
(France) T Droguet (France) M Martineau	5	6	[10]
(France) G Jacq (France) L Sanchez	3	4
2	(Colombia) N Barrientos (Tunisia) S Mansouri	6	6

Semifinals
(Switzerland) J Paul (Czech Republic) M Vocel	6	7
WC	(France) M Kouamé (France) T Lamasine	2	5
(France) T Droguet (France) M Martineau	5	3
2	(Colombia) N Barrientos (Tunisia) S Mansouri	7	6

Final
(Switzerland) J Paul (Czech Republic) M Vocel	5	6	[5]
2	(Colombia) N Barrientos (Tunisia) S Mansouri	7	4	[10]
