= 2024 Brest Challenger – Singles =

Singles
- 2024 Brest Challenger

Final
- Champion: (Finland) Otto Virtanen
- Runner-up: (France) Benjamin Bonzi
- Score: 6–4, 4–6, 7–6^{(8–6)}

Events
Singles	Doubles
← 2023 ·	Brest Challenger	· 2025 →

Pedro Martínez was the defending champion but chose not to defend his title.

Otto Virtanen won the title after defeating Benjamin Bonzi 6–4, 4–6, 7–6^{(8–6)} in the final.

== Seeds ==
1. (France) Hugo Gaston (withdrew)
2. (Bosnia and Herzegovina) Damir Džumhur (second round)
3. (France) Harold Mayot (first round)
4. (Italy) Mattia Bellucci (withdrew)
5. (United Kingdom) Billy Harris (second round)
6. (Kazakhstan) Mikhail Kukushkin (quarterfinals)
7. (Serbia) Laslo Djere (first round)
8. (Finland) Otto Virtanen (champion)

== Draw ==
=== Key ===
- Q = Qualifier
- WC = Wild card
- LL = Lucky loser
- Alt = Alternate
- SE = Special exempt
- PR = Protected ranking
- ITF = ITF entry
- JE = Junior exempt
- w/o = Walkover
- r = Retired
- d = Defaulted
- SR = Special ranking

=== Finals ===
Semifinals
(France) Benjamin Bonzi	6^{5}	7^{7}	7^{7}
Alt	Alibek Kachmazov	7^{7}	6^{3}	6^{4}
LL	(Lebanon) Benjamin Hassan	3	5
8	(Finland) Otto Virtanen	6	7

Final
(France) Benjamin Bonzi	4	6	6^{6}
8	(Finland) Otto Virtanen	6	4	7^{8}

=== Top half ===
First round
Q	(France) C Hemery	5	3
(France) B Bonzi	7	6
Q	(Germany) MH Rehberg	7	3	3
(France) P-H Herbert	5	6	6
(Brazil) J Fonseca	6	7
(Poland) K Majchrzak	4	5
Q	(France) Alexis Gautier	2	3
5	(United Kingdom) B Harris	6	6
3	(France) H Mayot	6	3	6^{3}
Alt	A Kachmazov	2	6	7^{7}
Q	(Hungary) Z Piros	6	7^{11}
(France) T Droguet	4	6^{9}
Alt	(Spain) C Taberner	6^{4}	2
(France) G Barrère	7^{7}	6
(Lithuania) E Butvilas	4	6	6^{3}
6	(Kazakhstan) M Kukushkin	6	4	7^{7}

Second round
(France) B Bonzi	5	7^{7}	6
(France) P-H Herbert	7	6^{4}	3
(Brazil) J Fonseca	6	6
5	(United Kingdom) B Harris	4	2
Alt	A Kachmazov	3	6	6
Q	(Hungary) Z Piros	6	4	1
(France) G Barrère	1	3
6	(Kazakhstan) M Kukushkin	6	6

Quarterfinals
(France) B Bonzi	6	6^{8}	6
(Brazil) J Fonseca	4	7^{10}	4
Alt	A Kachmazov	6	6
6	(Kazakhstan) M Kukushkin	3	2

Semifinals
(France) B Bonzi	6^{5}	7^{7}	7^{7}
Alt	A Kachmazov	7^{7}	6^{3}	6^{4}

=== Bottom half ===
First round
7	(Serbia) L Djere	6^{5}	4
(Spain) M Landaluce	7^{7}	6
LL	(Bulgaria) A Andreev	5	6	4
LL	(Lebanon) B Hassan	7	4	6
(France) H Grenier	6	6
(Belgium) R Collignon	4	4
WC	(France) M Guinard	3	4
Q	(Switzerland) J Paul	6	6
8	(Finland) O Virtanen	3	7	6
WC	(France) A Géa	6	5	3
Q	A Vatutin	0	6	5
WC	(France) M Martineau	6	4	7
Alt	(United States) Em Nava	3	5
(France) L Van Assche	6	7
LL	(Jordan) A Shelbayh	1	1
2	(Bosnia and Herzegovina) D Džumhur	6	6

Second round
(Spain) M Landaluce	2	7^{7}	2
LL	(Lebanon) B Hassan	6	6^{2}	6
(France) H Grenier	4	2
Q	(Switzerland) J Paul	6	6
8	(Finland) O Virtanen	6	6
WC	(France) M Martineau	3	2
(France) L Van Assche	7	7
2	(Bosnia and Herzegovina) D Džumhur	5	5

Quarterfinals
LL	(Lebanon) B Hassan	6	6
Q	(Switzerland) J Paul	4	3
8	(Finland) O Virtanen	7^{7}	6
(France) L Van Assche	6^{1}	4

Semifinals
LL	(Lebanon) B Hassan	3	5
8	(Finland) O Virtanen	6	7
