= 2015 Brest Challenger – Singles =

Singles
- 2015 Brest Challenger

Final
- Champion: (Croatia) Ivan Dodig
- Runner-up: (France) Benoît Paire
- Score: 7–5, 6–1

Events
Singles	Doubles
Brest Challenger	· 2016 →

This was the first edition of the tournament, Ivan Dodig won the title beating Benoît Paire in the final 7–5, 6–1.

== Seeds ==
1. (France) Benoît Paire (final)
2. (France) Nicolas Mahut (first round)
3. (Ukraine) Illya Marchenko (first round)
4. (Australia) John-Patrick Smith (first round)
5. (Slovakia) Norbert Gombos (first round)
6. (Croatia) Ivan Dodig (champion)
7. (Uzbekistan) Farrukh Dustov (first round)
8. (Italy) Luca Vanni (semifinals)

== Draw ==
=== Key ===
- Q = Qualifier
- WC = Wild card
- LL = Lucky loser
- Alt = Alternate
- ITF = ITF entry
- PR = Protected ranking
- SR = Special ranking
- SE = Special exempt
- JE = Junior exempt
- JR = Junior Accelerator Programme entrant
- CO = College Accelerator Programme entrant
- NG = Next Gen Accelerator Program entrant
- w/o = Walkover
- r = Retired
- d = Defaulted

=== Finals ===
Semifinals
1/WC	(France) Benoît Paire	7^{8}	6
8	(Italy) Luca Vanni	6^{6}	1
(France) Édouard Roger-Vasselin	6	3	2
6	(Croatia) Ivan Dodig	4	6	6

Final
1/WC	(France) Benoît Paire	5	1
6	(Croatia) Ivan Dodig	7	6

=== Top half ===
First round
1/WC	(France) B Paire	6	6
Q	(France) S Doumbia	2	4
(France) M Teixeira	3	7^{9}	6
Q	(Belgium) Y Reuter	6	6^{7}	1
(France) D Guez	6	6
(Spain) R Ramírez Hidalgo	2	1
WC	(France) G Jacq	6	6
7	(Uzbekistan) F Dustov	3	2
4	(Australia) J-P Smith	7^{8}	6^{2}	4
(Netherlands) I Sijsling	6^{6}	7^{7}	6
Q	(France) Maxime Tabatruong	6^{5}	7^{7}	6
(Slovakia) L Lacko	7^{7}	6^{3}	3
(Italy) S Caruso	6^{5}	3
(France) Sebastien Boltz	7^{7}	6
(Russia) I Nedelko	3	2
8	(Italy) L Vanni	6	6

Second round
1/WC	(France) B Paire	6	5	3
(France) M Teixeira	2	7	0^{r}
(France) D Guez	6	6
WC	(France) G Jacq	4	3
(Netherlands) I Sijsling	6	6
Q	(France) M Tabatruong	2	0
(France) S Boltz	5	2
8	(Italy) L Vanni	7	6

Quarterfinals
1/WC	(France) B Paire	7	6^{6}	6
(France) D Guez	5	7^{8}	3
(Netherlands) I Sijsling	5	6	6^{4}
8	(Italy) L Vanni	7	4	7^{7}

Semifinals
1/WC	(France) B Paire	7^{8}	6
8	(Italy) L Vanni	6^{6}	1

=== Bottom half ===
First round
5	(Slovakia) N Gombos	3	2
(France) É Roger-Vasselin	6	6
(Belgium) M Authom	6	5	6
WC	(France) A Sidorenko	4	7	4
(France) V Millot	7^{7}	4	4
(France) C Hemery	6^{3}	6	6
(Russia) K Khachanov	7^{7}	1
3/SE	(Ukraine) I Marchenko	6^{4}	0^{r}
6	(Croatia) I Dodig	6^{6}	6	6
WC	(France) R Jouan	7^{8}	2	1
(Poland) M Przysiężny	5	6	6
(Italy) M Donati	7	2	3
(Romania) A Ungur	6	6
Q	(Portugal) Romain Barbosa	4	2
(Italy) A Arnaboldi	2	6	7^{9}
2	(France) N Mahut	6	3	6^{7}

Second round
(France) É Roger-Vasselin	6	7
(Belgium) M Authom	0	5
(France) C Hemery	6	6^{4}	5
(Russia) K Khachanov	3	7^{7}	7
6	(Croatia) I Dodig	6	6
(Poland) M Przysiężny	2	3
(Romania) A Ungur	1	5
(Italy) A Arnaboldi	6	7

Quarterfinals
(France) É Roger-Vasselin	6	7^{7}
(Russia) K Khachanov	4	6^{5}
6	(Croatia) I Dodig	6	7
(Italy) A Arnaboldi	3	5

Semifinals
(France) É Roger-Vasselin	6	3	2
6	(Croatia) I Dodig	4	6	6
