= 2017 Brest Challenger – Doubles =

Doubles
- 2017 Brest Challenger

Final
- Champions: (Netherlands) Sander Arends (Croatia) Antonio Šančić
- Runners-up: (United Kingdom) Scott Clayton (India) Divij Sharan
- Score: 6–4, 7–5

Events
Singles	Doubles
← 2016 ·	Brest Challenger	· 2018 →

Sander Arends and Mateusz Kowalczyk were the defending champions but only Arends chose to defend his title, partnering Antonio Šančić.

Arends successfully defended his title after defeating Scott Clayton and Divij Sharan 6–4, 7–5 in the final.

== Seeds ==
1. (Netherlands) Wesley Koolhof / (New Zealand) Artem Sitak (first round)
2. (Czech Republic) Roman Jebavý / (Canada) Adil Shamasdin (first round)
3. (India) Leander Paes / (India) Purav Raja (quarterfinals)
4. (United Kingdom) Ken Skupski / (United Kingdom) Neal Skupski (first round)

== Draw ==
=== Key ===
- Q = Qualifier
- WC = Wild card
- LL = Lucky loser
- Alt = Alternate
- SE = Special exempt
- PR = Protected ranking
- ITF = ITF entry
- JE = Junior exempt
- w/o = Walkover
- r = Retired
- d = Defaulted
- SR = Special ranking

First round
1	(Netherlands) W Koolhof (New Zealand) A Sitak	5	4
(France) J Chardy (Italy) A Giannessi	7	6
(Netherlands) S Arends (Croatia) A Šančić	6	6
(Belarus) A Bury (Sweden) A Siljeström	3	4
4	(United Kingdom) K Skupski (United Kingdom) N Skupski	6^{4}	3
(Belgium) S Gillé (Belgium) J Vliegen	7^{7}	6
(Germany) A Begemann (France) J Eysseric	6	6
(Serbia) L Đere (Bosnia and Herzegovina) A Šetkić	3	1
(Russia) M Elgin (Slovakia) I Zelenay	2	5
WC	(France) T Lamasine (France) H Nys	6	7
WC	(France) G Blancaneaux (France) C Lestienne	2	4
3	(India) L Paes (India) P Raja	6	6
WC	(France) M Bourgue (France) U Humbert	4	4
(Germany) Y Hanfmann (Germany) K Krawietz	6	6
(United Kingdom) S Clayton (India) D Sharan	6	7^{7}
2	(Czech Republic) R Jebavý (Canada) A Shamasdin	4	6^{4}

Quarterfinals
(France) J Chardy (Italy) A Giannessi	3	6^{2}
(Netherlands) S Arends (Croatia) A Šančić	6	7^{7}
(Belgium) S Gillé (Belgium) J Vliegen	7^{7}	7
(Germany) A Begemann (France) J Eysseric	6^{5}	5
WC	(France) T Lamasine (France) H Nys	2	7^{10}	[10]
3	(India) L Paes (India) P Raja	6	6^{8}	[3]
(Germany) Y Hanfmann (Germany) K Krawietz	6^{5}	3
(United Kingdom) S Clayton (India) D Sharan	7^{7}	6

Semifinals
(Netherlands) S Arends (Croatia) A Šančić	5	6	[10]
(Belgium) S Gillé (Belgium) J Vliegen	7	3	[5]
WC	(France) T Lamasine (France) H Nys	6	0	[9]
(United Kingdom) S Clayton (India) D Sharan	4	6	[11]

Final
(Netherlands) S Arends (Croatia) A Šančić	6	7
(United Kingdom) S Clayton (India) D Sharan	4	5
