= 2023 Brest Challenger – Singles =

Singles
- 2023 Brest Challenger

Final
- Champion: (Spain) Pedro Martínez
- Runner-up: (France) Benjamin Bonzi
- Score: 7–6^{(8–6)}, 7–6^{(7–1)}

Events
Singles	Doubles
← 2022 ·	Brest Challenger	· 2024 →

Grégoire Barrère was the defending champion but chose not to defend his title.

Pedro Martínez won the title after defeating Benjamin Bonzi 7–6^{(8–6)}, 7–6^{(7–1)} in the final.

== Seeds ==
1. (France) Richard Gasquet (first round)
2. (Portugal) Nuno Borges (second round)
3. (Spain) Jaume Munar (first round)
4. (France) Benjamin Bonzi (final)
5. (France) Constant Lestienne (semifinals)
6. (France) Hugo Gaston (semifinals)
7. (United Kingdom) Liam Broady (second round)
8. (Belgium) David Goffin (second round)

== Draw ==
=== Key ===
- Q = Qualifier
- WC = Wild card
- LL = Lucky loser
- Alt = Alternate
- SE = Special exempt
- PR = Protected ranking
- ITF = ITF entry
- JE = Junior exempt
- w/o = Walkover
- r = Retired
- d = Defaulted
- SR = Special ranking

=== Finals ===
Semifinals
6	(France) Hugo Gaston	6	2	4
4	(France) Benjamin Bonzi	3	6	6
(Spain) Pedro Martínez	6	7
5	(France) Constant Lestienne	4	5

Final
4	(France) Benjamin Bonzi	6^{6}	6^{1}
(Spain) Pedro Martínez	7^{8}	7^{7}

=== Top half ===
First round
1/WC	(France) R Gasquet	1	4
(United States) B Nakashima	6	6
(France) A Cazaux	6	6
SE	(Austria) D Novak	3	4
(Italy) G Zeppieri	6	3
(France) A Escoffier	3	1^{r}
LL	(France) G Blancaneaux	0	4
6	(France) H Gaston	6	6
4	(France) B Bonzi	6	7
(Spain) P Llamas Ruiz	3	5
WC	(France) G Mpetshi Perricard	7^{7}	6^{5}	4
Q	(France) C Hemery	6^{2}	7^{7}	6
Q	(United Kingdom) R Peniston	2	4
Q	(United Kingdom) A Fery	6	6
LL	(Netherlands) G Brouwer	6^{2}	7	6^{3}
8	(Belgium) D Goffin	7^{7}	5	7^{7}

Second round
(United States) B Nakashima	2	6	5
(France) A Cazaux	6	3	7
(Italy) G Zeppieri	6^{6}	3
6	(France) H Gaston	7^{8}	6
4	(France) B Bonzi	4	7^{8}	6
Q	(France) C Hemery	6	6^{2}	2
Q	(United Kingdom) A Fery	6	6^{5}	6
8	(Belgium) D Goffin	1	7^{7}	3

Quarterfinals
(France) A Cazaux	2	2
6	(France) H Gaston	6	6
4	(France) B Bonzi	6	6
Q	(United Kingdom) A Fery	3	4

Semifinals
6	(France) H Gaston	6	2	4
4	(France) B Bonzi	3	6	6

=== Bottom half ===
First round
7	(United Kingdom) L Broady	6	6
(Italy) L Nardi	3	2
(Hungary) Z Piros	2	6	6
Q	(Croatia) D Ajduković	6	2	4
(Moldova) R Albot	6^{4}	6	6
Q	(Canada) G Diallo	7^{7}	2	3
(Spain) P Martínez	7	1	6
3	(Spain) J Munar	5	6	4
5	(France) C Lestienne	6	3	6
(Finland) O Virtanen	2	6	3
(France) C Moutet	4	6^{5}
(France) B Paire	6	7^{7}
Q	(France) M Martineau	6	4	3
WC	(France) T Droguet	4	6	6
LL	(Portugal) F Ferreira Silva	3	3
2	(Portugal) N Borges	6	6

Second round
7	(United Kingdom) L Broady	2	6	6^{4}
(Hungary) Z Piros	6	4	7^{7}
(Moldova) R Albot	6^{2}	7^{13}
(Spain) P Martínez	7^{7}	7^{15}
5	(France) C Lestienne	6	2
(France) B Paire	2	0^{r}
WC	(France) T Droguet	7	6
2	(Portugal) N Borges	5	3

Quarterfinals
(Hungary) Z Piros	3	6^{7}
(Spain) P Martínez	6	7^{9}
5	(France) C Lestienne	6	6
WC	(France) T Droguet	3	2

Semifinals
(Spain) P Martínez	6	7
5	(France) C Lestienne	4	5
