= 2021 Play In Challenger – Doubles =

Doubles
- 2021 Play In Challenger

Final
- Champions: (France) Benjamin Bonzi (France) Antoine Hoang
- Runners-up: (France) Dan Added (Belgium) Michael Geerts
- Score: 6–3, 6–1

Events
Singles	Doubles
← 2019 ·	Play In Challenger	· 2022 →

Romain Arneodo and Hugo Nys were the defending champions but lost in the quarterfinals to Benjamin Bonzi and Antoine Hoang.

Bonzi and Hoang won the title after defeating Dan Added and Michael Geerts 6–3, 6–1 in the final.

== Seeds ==
1. (Netherlands) Sander Arends / (Netherlands) David Pel (semifinals)
2. (Monaco) Romain Arneodo / (Monaco) Hugo Nys (quarterfinals)
3. (Finland) Harri Heliövaara / (Australia) Matt Reid (withdrew)
4. (France) Grégoire Barrère / (France) Albano Olivetti (first round)
5. (France) Quentin Halys / (France) Tristan Lamasine (first round)

== Draw ==
=== Key ===
- Q = Qualifier
- WC = Wild card
- LL = Lucky loser
- Alt = Alternate
- SE = Special exempt
- PR = Protected ranking
- ITF = ITF entry
- JE = Junior exempt
- w/o = Walkover
- r = Retired
- d = Defaulted
- SR = Special ranking

First round
(France) M Bourgue (France) A Müller	6	6
(Argentina) P Cachin (Norway) V Durasovic	3	4
4	(France) G Barrère (France) A Olivetti	2	4
WC	(France) M Janvier (France) Lilian Marmousez	6	6
(France) M Martineau (France) A Reymond	6	3	[8]
PR	(Germany) D Brown (France) M Guinard	2	6	[10]
(Czech Republic) J Forejtek (Czech Republic) V Šafránek	6	3	[10]
5	(France) Q Halys (France) T Lamasine	2	6	[2]
WC	(France) Jurgen Briand (France) Cyril Vandermeersch	3	1
(France) B Bonzi (France) A Hoang	6	6

Quarterfinals
1	(Netherlands) S Arends (Netherlands) D Pel	4	6	[10]
(France) M Bourgue (France) A Müller	6	3	[5]
WC	(France) M Janvier (France) L Marmousez
(France) D Added (Belgium) M Geerts	w/o
PR	(Germany) D Brown (France) M Guinard	6	5	[10]
(Czech Republic) J Forejtek (Czech Republic) V Šafránek	1	7	[7]
(France) B Bonzi (France) A Hoang	4	6	[11]
2	(Monaco) R Arneodo (Monaco) H Nys	6	3	[9]

Semifinals
1	(Netherlands) S Arends (Netherlands) D Pel	1	3
(France) D Added (Belgium) M Geerts	6	6
PR	(Germany) D Brown (France) M Guinard	6	2	[11]
(France) B Bonzi (France) A Hoang	4	6	[13]

Final
(France) D Added (Belgium) M Geerts	3	1
(France) B Bonzi (France) A Hoang	6	6
