= 2017 Brest Challenger =

- Date: 23–29 October
- Edition: 3rd
- Surface: Hard
- Location: Brest, France

Champions

Singles
- (France) Corentin Moutet

Doubles
- (Netherlands) Sander Arends / (Croatia) Antonio Šančić
← 2016 ·	Brest Challenger	· 2018 →

The 2017 Brest Challenger was a professional tennis tournament played on hard courts. It was the third edition of the tournament which was part of the 2017 ATP Challenger Tour. It took place in Brest, France between 23 and 29 October 2017.

== Singles main-draw entrants ==
=== Seeds ===
Country	Player	Rank^{1}	Seed
RUS	Daniil Medvedev	67	1
ROU	Marius Copil	74	2
SVK	Norbert Gombos	83	3
FRA	Jérémy Chardy	84	4
TUN	Malek Jaziri	89	5
SRB	Laslo Đere	90	6
RUS	Andrey Kuznetsov	95	7
ITA	Matteo Berrettini	120	8

- ^{1} Rankings are as of 16 October 2017.

=== Other entrants ===
The following players received wildcards into the singles main draw:

- (France) Geoffrey Blancaneaux
- (France) David Guez
- (France) Ugo Humbert
- (France) Corentin Moutet

The following players received entry into the singles main draw as special exempts:

- (Italy) Matteo Donati
- (Greece) Stefanos Tsitsipas

The following player received entry into the singles main draw as an alternate:

- (France) Gleb Sakharov

The following players received entry from the qualifying draw:

- (France) Tristan Lamasine
- (Ukraine) Illya Marchenko
- (France) Gianni Mina
- (Belgium) Yannik Reuter

The following player received entry as a lucky loser:

- (Italy) Andrea Arnaboldi

== Champions ==
=== Singles ===
- (France) Corentin Moutet def. (Greece) Stefanos Tsitsipas 6–2, 7–6^{(10–8)}.

=== Doubles ===
- (Netherlands) Sander Arends / (Croatia) Antonio Šančić def. (United Kingdom) Scott Clayton / (India) Divij Sharan 6–4, 7–5.
