= 2016 Brest Challenger =

- Date: 17–23 October
- Edition: 2nd
- Surface: Hard
- Location: Brest, France

Champions

Singles
- (Slovakia) Norbert Gombos

Doubles
- (Netherlands) Sander Arends / (Poland) Mateusz Kowalczyk
← 2015 ·	Brest Challenger	· 2017 →

The 2016 Brest Challenger was a professional tennis tournament played on hard courts. It was the second edition of the tournament which was part of the 2016 ATP Challenger Tour. It took place in Brest, France between 17 and 23 October 2016.

== Singles main-draw entrants ==
=== Seeds ===
Country	Player	Rank^{1}	Seed
FRA	Jérémy Chardy	80	1
SVK	Lukáš Lacko	116	2
SUI	Marco Chiudinelli	120	3
ITA	Alessandro Giannessi	143	4
CAN	Steven Diez	163	5
ITA	Luca Vanni	168	6
FRA	~~Quentin Halys~~	~~170~~	~~7~~
SRB	Marko Tepavac	181	8

- ^{1} Rankings are as of October 10, 2016.

=== Other entrants ===
The following players received wildcards into the singles main draw:

- (France) Evan Furness
- (France) Corentin Moutet
- (France) Laurent Lokoli

The following players received entry using special exemptions:

- (Greece) Stefanos Tsitsipas
- (France) Maxime Janvier

The following players received entry from the qualifying draw:

- (France) Grégoire Jacq
- (France) Romain Jouan
- (Switzerland) Yann Marti
- (Austria) Maximilian Neuchrist

The following players entered as a lucky losers:

- (Slovakia) Norbert Gombos
- (Belgium) Sander Gillé

== Champions ==
=== Singles ===
- (Slovakia) Norbert Gombos def. (Belgium) Yannik Reuter, 7–5, 6–2

=== Doubles ===
- (Netherlands) Sander Arends / (Poland) Mateusz Kowalczyk def. (Switzerland) Marco Chiudinelli / (Italy) Luca Vanni, 6–7^{(2–7)}, 6–3, [10–5]
