= 2021 Brest Challenger =

- Date: 25–31 October
- Edition: 6th
- Surface: Hard (Indoor)
- Location: Brest, France

Champions

Singles
- (United States) Brandon Nakashima

Doubles
- (France) Sadio Doumbia / (France) Fabien Reboul
← 2019 ·	Brest Challenger	· 2022 →

The 2021 Brest Challenger was a professional tennis tournament played on hard courts. It was the sixth edition of the tournament which was part of the 2021 ATP Challenger Tour. It took place in Brest, France between 25 and 31 October 2021.

== Singles main-draw entrants ==
=== Seeds ===
Country	Player	Rank^{1}	Seed
FRA	Arthur Rinderknech	65	1
~~USA~~	~~Jenson Brooksby~~	~~70~~	~~2~~
FRA	Richard Gasquet	74	3
USA	Brandon Nakashima	79	4
ITA	Stefano Travaglia	83	5
FRA	Pierre-Hugues Herbert	97	6
SUI	Henri Laaksonen	99	7
FRA	Hugo Gaston	106	8

- ^{1} Rankings are as of 18 October 2021.

=== Other entrants ===
The following players received wildcards into the singles main draw:

- (France) Manuel Guinard
- (France) Arthur Rinderknech
- (France) Luca Van Assche

The following player received entry into the singles main draw as a special exempt:

- (Spain) Carlos Taberner

The following player received entry into the singles main draw as an alternate:

- (France) Maxime Janvier

The following players received entry from the qualifying draw:

- (France) Kenny de Schepper
- (Kazakhstan) Aleksandr Nedovyesov
- (Hungary) Zsombor Piros
- (Russia) Alexey Vatutin

The following player received entry as a lucky loser:

- (France) Valentin Royer

== Champions ==
=== Singles ===
- (United States) Brandon Nakashima def. (Portugal) João Sousa 6–3, 6–3.

=== Doubles ===
- (France) Sadio Doumbia / (France) Fabien Reboul def. (Italy) Salvatore Caruso / (Italy) Federico Gaio 4–6, 6–3, [10–3].
