= 2024 Brest Challenger =

- Date: 21–27 October
- Edition: 9th
- Surface: Hard (indoor)
- Location: Brest, France

Champions

Singles
- (Finland) Otto Virtanen

Doubles
- (Colombia) Nicolás Barrientos / (Tunisia) Skander Mansouri
- Brest Challenger

The 2024 Brest Open Groupe Vert was a professional tennis tournament played on hard courts. It was the ninth edition of the tournament which was part of the 2024 ATP Challenger Tour. It took place in Brest, France between 21 and 27 October 2024.

== Singles main-draw entrants ==
=== Seeds ===
Country	Player	Rank^{1}	Seed
~~FRA~~	~~Hugo Gaston~~	~~77~~	~~1~~
BIH	Damir Džumhur	100	2
FRA	Harold Mayot	103	3
~~ITA~~	~~Mattia Bellucci~~	~~106~~	~~4~~
GBR	Billy Harris	110	5
KAZ	Mikhail Kukushkin	111	6
SRB	Laslo Djere	113	7
FIN	Otto Virtanen	116	8

- ^{1} Rankings are as of 14 October 2024.

=== Other entrants ===
The following players received wildcards into the singles main draw:

- (France) Arthur Géa
- (France) Manuel Guinard
- (France) Matteo Martineau

The following players received entry into the singles main draw as alternates:

- Alibek Kachmazov
- (United States) Emilio Nava
- (Spain) Carlos Taberner

The following players received entry from the qualifying draw:

- (France) Alexis Gautier
- (France) Calvin Hemery
- (Switzerland) Jakub Paul
- (Hungary) Zsombor Piros
- (Germany) Max Hans Rehberg
- Alexey Vatutin

The following players received entry as lucky losers:

- (Bulgaria) Adrian Andreev
- (Lebanon) Benjamin Hassan
- (Jordan) Abdullah Shelbayh

== Champions ==
=== Singles ===
- (Finland) Otto Virtanen def. (France) Benjamin Bonzi 6–4, 4–6, 7–6^{(8–6)}.

=== Doubles ===
- (Colombia) Nicolás Barrientos / (Tunisia) Skander Mansouri def. (Switzerland) Jakub Paul / (Czech Republic) Matěj Vocel 7–5, 4–6, [10–5].
