= 2019 Brest Challenger =

- Date: 21–27 October
- Edition: 5th
- Surface: Hard
- Location: Brest, France

Champions

Singles
- (France) Ugo Humbert

Doubles
- (Ukraine) Denys Molchanov / (Belarus) Andrei Vasilevski
← 2018 ·	Brest Challenger	· 2021 →

The 2019 Brest Challenger was a professional tennis tournament played on hard courts. It was the fifth edition of the tournament which was part of the 2019 ATP Challenger Tour. It took place in Brest, France between 21 and 27 October 2019.

== Singles main-draw entrants ==
=== Seeds ===
Country	Player	Rank^{1}	Seed
FRA	Ugo Humbert	70	1
ESP	Roberto Carballés Baena	80	2
ITA	Thomas Fabbiano	89	3
FRA	Corentin Moutet	94	4
ESP	Jaume Munar	99	5
RSA	Lloyd Harris	106	6
FRA	Antoine Hoang	107	7
RUS	Evgeny Donskoy	113	8
SVK	Norbert Gombos	116	9
ITA	Paolo Lorenzi	117	10
GER	Yannick Maden	118	11
CZE	Jiří Veselý	120	12
JPN	Yūichi Sugita	129	13
ESP	Guillermo García López	141	14
FRA	Enzo Couacaud	177	15
FRA	Quentin Halys	180	16

- ^{1} Rankings are as of 14 October 2019.

=== Other entrants ===
The following players received wildcards into the singles main draw:

- (France) Dan Added
- (France) Geoffrey Blancaneaux
- (France) Quentin Halys
- (France) Arthur Reymond
- (France) Rayane Roumane

The following player received entry into the singles main draw as a special exempt:

- (France) Ugo Humbert

The following players received entry from the qualifying draw:

- (France) Maxime Hamou
- (Ukraine) Illya Marchenko

== Champions ==
=== Singles ===
- (France) Ugo Humbert def. (Russia) Evgeny Donskoy 6–2, 6–3.

=== Doubles ===
- (Ukraine) Denys Molchanov / (Belarus) Andrei Vasilevski def. (Italy) Andrea Vavassori / (Spain) David Vega Hernández 6–3, 6–1.
