= 2015 Brest Challenger =

- Date: 19–25 October
- Edition: 1st
- Category: ATP Challenger Tour
- Draw: 32S/12D/11Q
- Prize money: €106,500
- Surface: Hard, Indoor
- Location: Brest, France
- Venue: Brest Arena

Champions

Singles
- (Croatia) Ivan Dodig

Doubles
- (Netherlands) Wesley Koolhof / (Netherlands) Matwé Middelkoop
Brest Challenger	· 2016 →

The 2015 Brest Challenger was a professional tennis tournament played on hard courts. It was the first edition of the tournament which was part of the 2015 ATP Challenger Tour. It took place at the Brest Arena in Brest, France between 19 and 25 October 2015.

== Points and prize money ==
=== Point distribution ===
Event	W	F	SF	QF	Round of 16	Round of 32	Q	Q2	Q1
Singles	125	75	45	25	10	0	5	0	0
Doubles	125	75	45	25	0	—	—	—	—

=== Prize money ===
Event	W	F	SF	QF	Round of 16	Round of 32	Q2	Q1
Singles	€15,300	€9,000	€5,375	€3,100	€1,830	€1,110	€0	€0
Doubles *	€6,600	€3,850	€2,300	€1,360	€770	—	—	—

_{* per team}

== Singles main-draw entrants ==
=== Seeds ===
Country	Player	Rank^{1}	Seed
FRA	Benoît Paire	25	1
FRA	Nicolas Mahut	69	2
UKR	Illya Marchenko	83	3
AUS	John-Patrick Smith	112	4
SVK	Norbert Gombos	123	5
CRO	Ivan Dodig	127	6
UZB	Farrukh Dustov	134	7
ITA	Luca Vanni	135	8

- ^{1} Rankings are as of 12 October 2015.

=== Other entrants ===
The following players received wildcards into the singles main draw:

- (France) Benoît Paire
- (France) Grégoire Jacq
- (France) Alexandre Sidorenko
- (France) Romain Jouan

The following player received entry using a special exemption:

- (Ukraine) Illya Marchenko

The following players received entry from the qualifying draw:

- (Portugal) Romain Barbosa
- (France) Maxime Tabatruong
- (France) Sadio Doumbia
- (Belgium) Yannik Reuter

=== Retirements ===
- (Ukraine) Illya Marchenko (left foot, first round)
- (France) Maxime Teixeira (left abductor, second round)

== Doubles main-draw entrants ==
=== Seeds ===
Country	Player	Country	Player	Rank^{1}	Seed
NED	Wesley Koolhof	NED	Matwé Middelkoop	159	1
GBR	Ken Skupski	GBR	Neal Skupski	214	2
SRB	Ilija Bozoljac	CRO	Antonio Šančić	267	3
USA	James Cerretani	AUT	Tristan-Samuel Weissborn	322	4

^{1} Rankings are as of 12 October 2015.

=== Other entrants ===
The following pair received a wildcard into the doubles main draw:

- (France) Romain Jouan / (France) Alexandre Penaud

== Champions ==
=== Singles ===
- (Croatia) Ivan Dodig def. (France) Benoît Paire, 7–5, 6–1.

=== Doubles ===
- (Netherlands) Wesley Koolhof / (Netherlands) Matwé Middelkoop def. (United Kingdom) Ken Skupski / (United Kingdom) Neal Skupski, 3–6, 6–4, [10–6].
