= 2023 Brest Challenger =

- Date: 23–29 October
- Edition: 8th
- Surface: Hard (Indoor)
- Location: Brest, France

Champions

Singles
- (Spain) Pedro Martínez

Doubles
- (India) Yuki Bhambri / (United Kingdom) Julian Cash
- Brest Challenger

The 2023 Open de Brest Crédit Agricole was a professional tennis tournament played on hardcourts. It was the eighth edition of the tournament which was part of the 2023 ATP Challenger Tour. It took place in Brest, France between 23 and 29 October 2023.

== Singles main-draw entrants ==
=== Seeds ===
Country	Player	Rank^{1}	Seed
FRA	Richard Gasquet	62	1
POR	Nuno Borges	74	2
ESP	Jaume Munar	83	3
FRA	Benjamin Bonzi	89	4
FRA	Constant Lestienne	93	5
FRA	Hugo Gaston	96	6
GBR	Liam Broady	100	7
BEL	David Goffin	105	8

- ^{1} Rankings are as of 16 October 2023.

=== Other entrants ===
The following players received wildcards into the singles main draw:

- (France) Titouan Droguet
- (France) Richard Gasquet
- (France) Giovanni Mpetshi Perricard

The following players received entry into the singles main draw as special exempts:

- (France) ~~Kyrian Jacquet~~
- (Austria) Dennis Novak

The following players received entry from the qualifying draw:

- (Croatia) Duje Ajduković
- (Canada) Gabriel Diallo
- (United Kingdom) Arthur Fery
- (France) Calvin Hemery
- (France) Matteo Martineau
- (United Kingdom) Ryan Peniston

The following players received entry as lucky losers:

- (France) Geoffrey Blancaneaux
- (Netherlands) Gijs Brouwer
- (Portugal) Frederico Ferreira Silva

== Champions ==
=== Singles ===
- (Spain) Pedro Martínez def. (France) Benjamin Bonzi 7–6^{(8–6)}, 7–6^{(7–1)}.

=== Doubles ===
- (India) Yuki Bhambri / (United Kingdom) Julian Cash def. (United States) Robert Galloway / (France) Albano Olivetti 6–7^{(5–7)}, 6–3, [10–5].
