= Benjamin Bonzi =

French tennis player (born 1996)

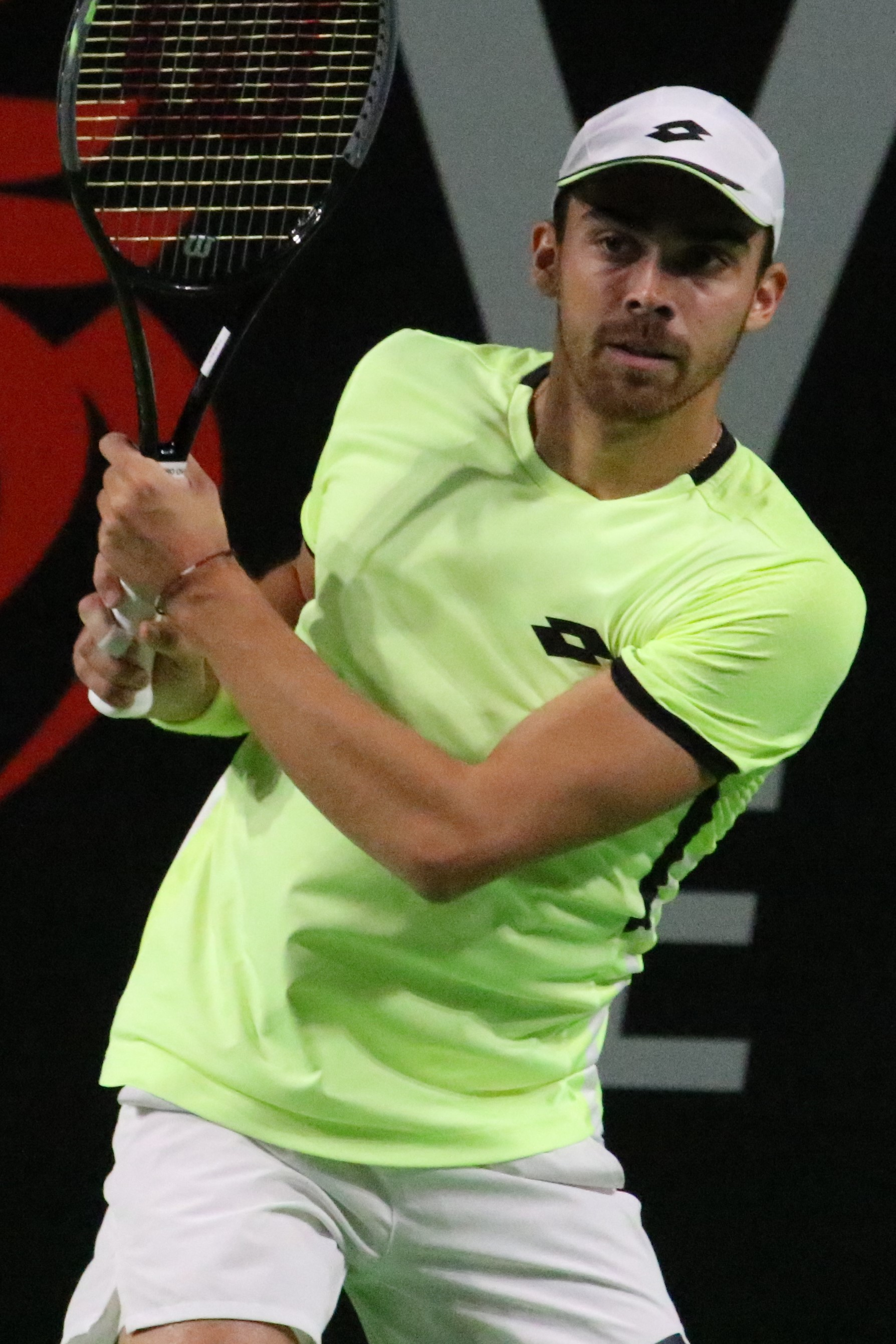
- Bonzi at the 2021 Internationaux de Tennis de Vendée
- Country (sports): France
- Residence: Anduze, France
- Born: 9 June 1996 (age 30) Nîmes, France
- Height: 1.83 m (6 ft 0 in)
- Turned pro: 2015
- Plays: Right-handed (two-handed backhand)
- Coach: Lionel Zimbler, Nicolas Mahut (2025-)
- Prize money: US $4,582,205

Singles
- Career record: 65–84
- Career titles: 1
- Highest ranking: No. 42 (6 February 2023)
- Current ranking: No. 91 (9 November 2026)

Grand Slam singles results
- Australian Open: 3R (2023, 2025)
- French Open: 2R (2017, 2020)
- Wimbledon: 2R (2021, 2022, 2025)
- US Open: 3R (2023, 2025, 2026)

Doubles
- Career record: 31–25
- Career titles: 1
- Highest ranking: No. 121 (19 September 2022)
- Current ranking: No. 228 (29 June 2026)

Grand Slam doubles results
- Australian Open: QF (2023)
- French Open: 3R (2020)
- Wimbledon: 1R (2022, 2025)
- US Open: 1R (2022, 2025, 2026)

Grand Slam mixed doubles results
- French Open: QF (2019)
- Last updated on: 3 July 2026.

Benjamin Bonzi (French pronunciation: [bɛ̃ʒamɛ̃ bɔ̃zi]; born 9 June 1996) is a French professional tennis player. Bonzi has a career-high ATP singles ranking of world No. 42 achieved on 6 February 2023 and a career-high doubles ranking of world No. 121 achieved on 19 September 2022.

== Career ==
=== 2014: Juniors ===
Bonzi won the 2014 French Open boys' doubles title with fellow countryman Quentin Halys after defeating Lucas Miedler and Akira Santillan in the final in straight sets.

=== 2017: Grand Slam debut & first win at French Open ===
A wildcard entry for the 2017 French Open, he won the match over Daniil Medvedev after his retirement in the first round, before losing to 19th seed Albert Ramos Vinolas in the second round.

=== 2018: Wimbledon debut ===
Bonzi qualified for the 2018 Wimbledon Championships, defeating Britain's James Ward in the final qualifying round, but lost to Lukáš Lacko in the first round of the main draw.

=== 2019: Major mixed doubles quarterfinal, ATP doubles final ===
He reached the quarterfinals of the 2019 French Open in mixed doubles as a wildcard partnering compatriot Amandine Hesse, where they lost to eventual champions Ivan Dodig and Latisha Chan.

He made his first final in doubles as a wildcard partnering compatriot Antoine Hoang at the 2019 Open Sud de France, where they lost to top seeds Édouard Roger-Vasselin and Ivan Dodig in straight sets.

=== 2020: French Open doubles third round ===
Bonzi qualified for the 2020 French Open, beating Ivo Karlović amongst others in qualifying. In the first round, Bonzi defeated Finland's Emil Ruusuvuori, before losing in a second-round clash against teenage Italian Jannik Sinner. In doubles as a wildcard he reached the third round of a Grand Slam for the first time in his career, partnering Antoine Hoang, where they were defeated by eighth-seeded German duo and eventual champions from Germany, Kevin Krawietz and Andreas Mies.

=== 2021: Historic six Challengers record, First Wimbledon win, Top 60 ===
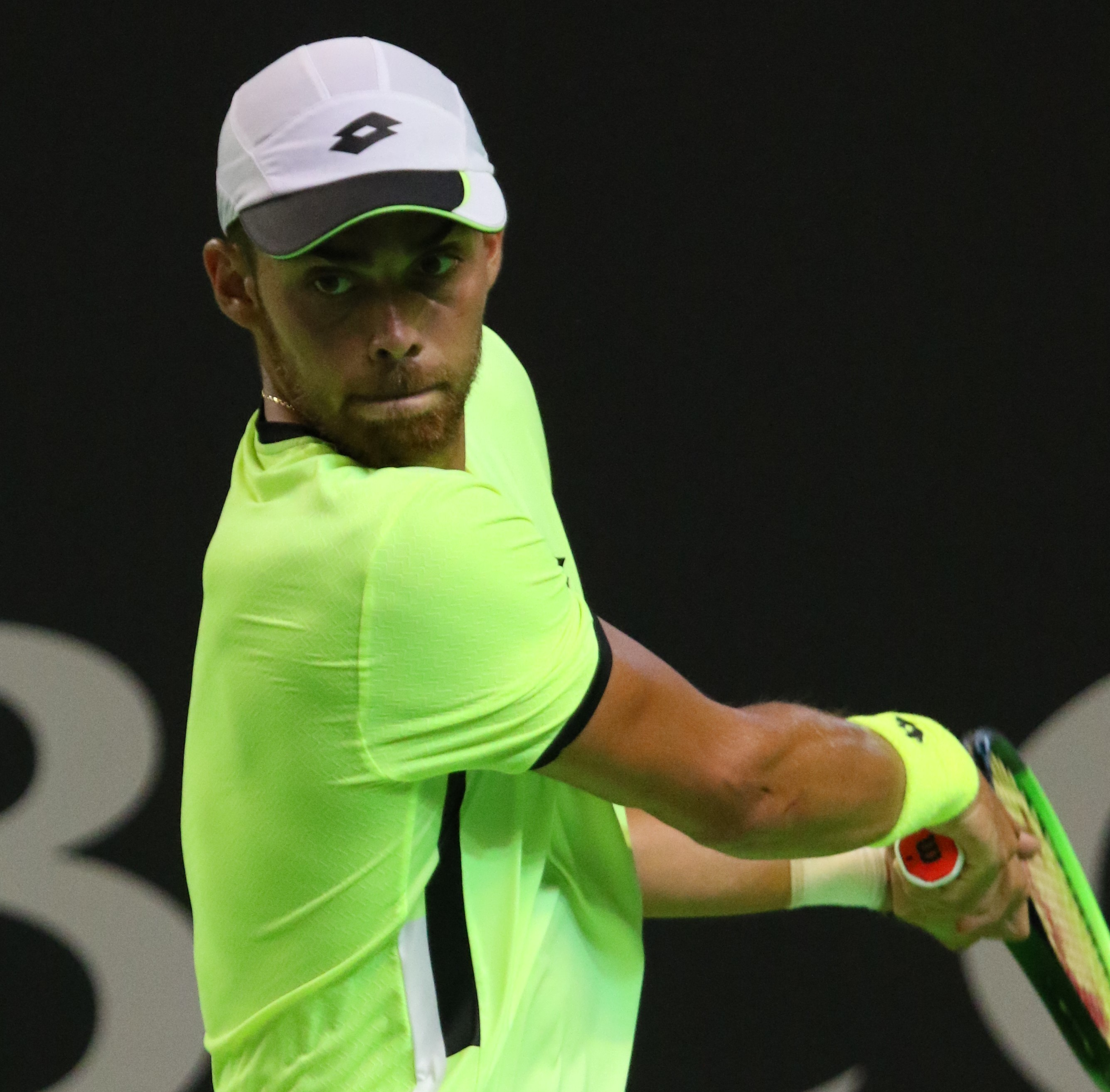
Bonzi at the 2021 Open de Rennes

Bonzi started the year winning his first and second Challengers in Potchefstroom and Ostrava. In July, Bonzi qualified for Wimbledon and reached the second round for the first time, after defeating fellow qualifier Marco Trungelliti in the first round. He then lost to 32nd seed Marin Čilić in the second round.

He made his top 100 debut after winning the Segovia Challenger over Tim van Rijthoven, jumping 16 spots to a new career-high of No. 95 in the world on 2 August 2021. He was the top seed in qualifying at the 2021 US Open, but lost to American Aleksandar Kovacevic in the second round. That same month, he won his fourth Challenger title in Saint-Tropez. He then won two more back-to-back Challengers in France in Cassis and Rennes, his fifth and sixth of 2021, making it three titles on home soil in three weeks with just three combined sets lost. He was the first player to go back-to-back-to-back on the circuit since Mikhail Youzhny in 2016. He joined Facundo Bagnis (2016), Juan Ignacio Chela (2001) and Younes El Aynaoui (1998) as the only players to lift six singles trophies in one season in ATP Challenger history. As a result, he reached a new career-high of World No. 61 on 20 September 2021. He subsequently reached the top 60 on 1 November 2021.

=== 2022: First ATP semifinal & Masters third round, top 50 ===
On his debut at the 2022 Australian Open, he won his first match at this Grand Slam tournament, defeating Peter Gojowczyk.

After the withdrawal of eighth seed Gianluca Mager, Bonzi became the ninth seed at the Open 13 in Marseilles, where he beat Kamil Majchrzak, defending finalist Pierre-Hugues Herbert and fourth seed Aslan Karatsev, his first career top-20 win, to reach his first career semifinal on the ATP Tour. He lost to second seed Andrey Rublev in the semifinals.

On his debut at the Indian Wells Masters, he reached the third round for the first time at this level, defeating 21st seed Lorenzo Sonego before losing to 10th seed Jannik Sinner.

At the 2022 Mallorca Championships he reached the quarterfinals by defeating World No. 15 and third seed Denis Shapovalov in the second round. He reached his second career semifinal on the ATP Tour without dropping a set in his three previous matches, defeating Daniel Altmaier in the quarterfinals. As a result, he reached the top 50 at world No. 47 in the ATP singles rankings on 27 June 2022. He reached the second round at the Wimbledon for a second consecutive year, losing to 29th seed Jenson Brooksby and later reached the top 45 in the rankings on 25 July 2022.

At the 2022 Winston-Salem Open he defeated Kyle Edmund in the second round. Next he defeated Thiago Monteiro to reach the quarterfinals.

Bonzi won his first match at the US Open on his debut, after beating compatriot Ugo Humbert in five sets. He lost in the second round to Nick Kyrgios.

=== 2023: ATP finals, Major singles third round & doubles quarterfinal ===
Bonzi made his first final in Pune, beating Tseng Chun-hsin, Emil Ruusuvuori, Filip Krajinović and Botic van de Zandschulp on his way there. He lost to Tallon Griekspoor in three sets in his maiden ATP Tour final.

At the 2023 Australian Open he reached the third round of a Grand Slam for the first time in his career, defeating 14th seed Pablo Carreño Busta in five sets, coming from 2-0 sets down, before losing to 22nd seed Alex de Minaur in straight sets. At the same tournament he reached the quarterfinals in doubles with partner Arthur Rinderknech also for the first time at a Major, where they lost to eventual runners-up Hugo Nys and Jan Zieliński.

In February, at the 2023 Open 13 Provence he reached the semifinals again for a second year in a row at this tournament defeating two seeds, fifth seed Maxime Cressy and third seed Alex de Minaur, getting his revenge for the Australian Open loss in January. He reached his second final of the season and of his career defeating compatriot Arthur Fils. He lost to top seed Hubert Hurkacz in the final in straight sets.

He skipped the Masters American "Sunshine double" and clay tournaments with the exception of 2023 Monte-Carlo Masters. He also skipped the 2023 French Open. As a result, he dropped out of the top 100 after losing in the first round at Wimbledon on 17 July 2023.

Bonzi received a wildcard for the US Open main draw where he defeated fellow countryman Quentin Halys to reach the second round for the second consecutive year. He then managed to defeat 28th seed Christopher Eubanks to reach the second Major third round of his career.

In September, Bonzi reached the final of the 2023 Open de Rennes, his first Challenger final in more than a year, losing to Maxime Cressy in the final. He returned to the top 100 as a result to world No. 93 on 18 September 2023.

=== 2024–2025: First ATP title, back to top 50 ===
On 15 April 2024, Bonzi dropped out of the top 150 to world No. 182, 140 spots below his career-high ranking a year earlier. Three months later, in July, Bonzi won his first Challenger title in two years in Winnipeg, defeating Sho Shimabukuro in the final.

In October, Bonzi had a 14-match winning streak by reaching three back-to-back Challenger finals on home soil. He first won the title in Roanne, defeating fellow countryman Matteo Martineau in the final, then won a second title in Saint-Brieuc, defeating top seed Lucas Pouille in the final, before losing to Otto Virtanen in Brest in his third straight final.

In November 2024, ranked No. 124, Bonzi won his first ATP Tour title at the Moselle Open as a qualifier, defeating en route second seed Casper Ruud, eight seed Alex Michelsen and then Cameron Norrie in the final in straight sets. As a result, he returned to the top 100 at world No. 78.

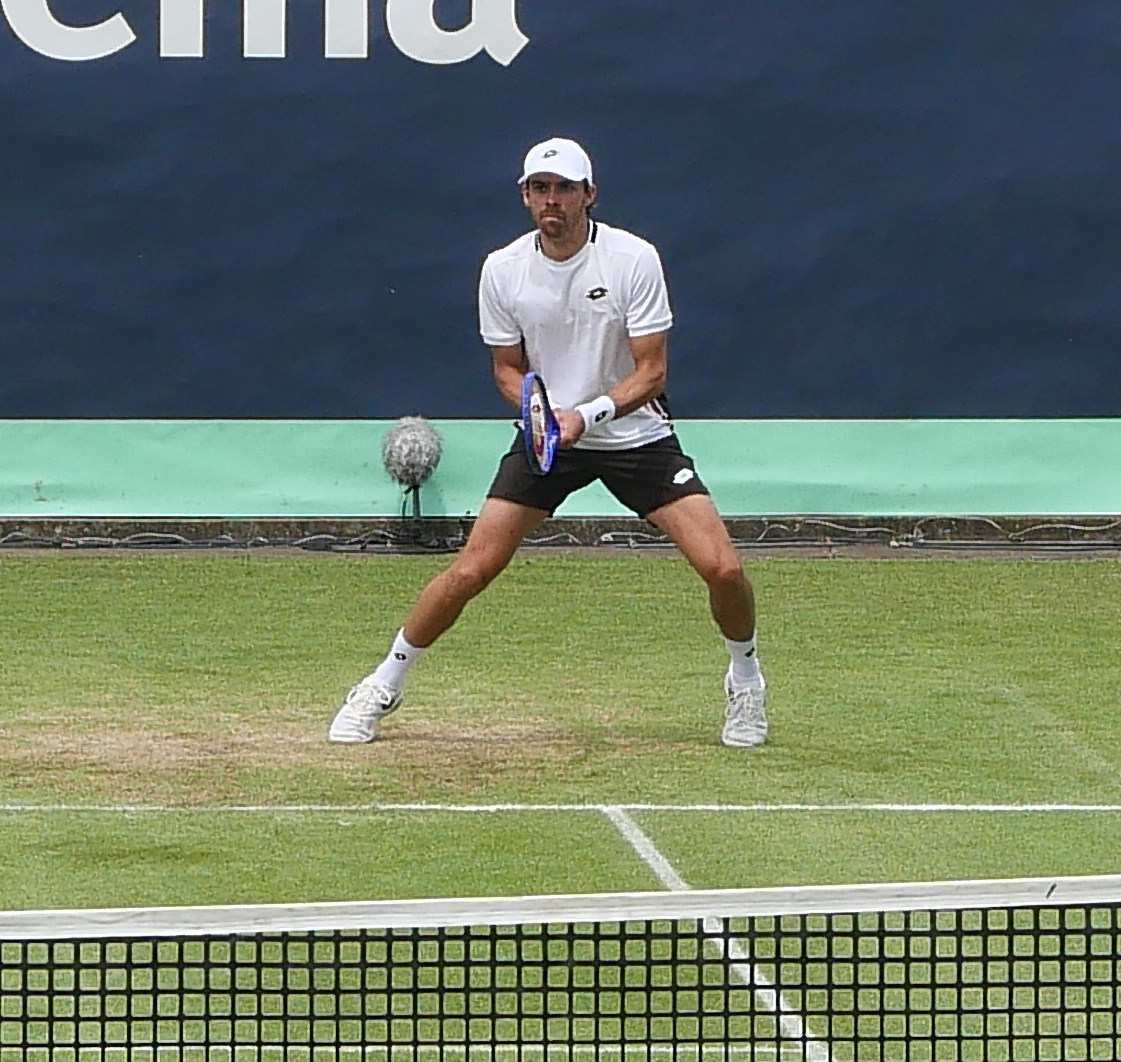
Bonzi at the 2026 Libéma Open

In August 2025, at the US Open, Bonzi reached the third round defeating Daniil Medvedev en route in five sets, and for the second time in the season in the opening round at the Majors, having won against him also at 2025 Wimbledon Championships.

== Performance timeline ==
Key
W	F	SF	QF	#R	RR	Q#	P#	DNQ	A	Z#	PO	G	S	B	NMS	NTI	P	NH

(W) winner; (F) finalist; (SF) semifinalist; (QF) quarterfinalist; (#R) rounds 4, 3, 2, 1; (RR) round-robin stage; (Q#) qualification round; (DNQ) did not qualify; (A) absent; (NH) not held; (SR) strike rate (events won / competed); (W–L) win–loss record.
To avoid confusion and double counting, these charts are updated at the conclusion of a tournament or when the player's participation has ended.

Tournament	2017	2018	2019	2020	2021	2022	2023	2024	2025	2026	SR	W–L	Win %
Grand Slam tournaments
Australian Open	A	A	A	A	Q1	2R	3R	1R	3R	1R	0 / 5	5–5	50%
French Open	2R	Q1	A	2R	1R	1R	A	Q2	1R	1R	0 / 6	2–6	25%
Wimbledon	A	1R	A	NH	2R	2R	1R	Q2	2R	1R	0 / 6	3–6	33%
US Open	Q1	A	A	A	Q2	2R	3R	Q2	3R	3R	0 / 4	7–4	64%
Win–loss	1–1	0–1	0–0	1–1	1–2	3–4	4–3	0–1	5–4	2–4	0 / 21	17–21	45%
ATP Masters 1000
Indian Wells Masters	A	A	A	NH	A	3R	A	A	1R	2R	0 / 3	3–3	50%
Miami Open	A	A	A	NH	A	1R	A	A	1R	Q2	0 / 2	0–2	0%
Monte-Carlo Masters	A	A	A	NH	A	1R	2R	A	Q1	A	0 / 2	1–2	33%
Madrid Open	A	A	A	NH	A	A	A	A	3R	2R	0 / 2	3–2	60%
Italian Open	A	A	A	A	A	A	A	A	A	Q1	0 / 0	0–0	–
Canadian Open	A	A	A	NH	Q1	1R	A	A	1R	1R	0 / 3	0–3	0%
Cincinnati Masters	A	A	A	A	A	1R	A	A	4R	Q1	0 / 2	3–2	60%
Shanghai Masters	A	A	A	NH			A	A	2R	A	0 / 1	1–1	50%
Paris Masters	Q1	A	A	2R	Q1	A	1R	A	A	1R	0 / 3	1–3	25%
Win–loss	0–0	0–0	0–0	1–1	0–0	2–5	1–2	0–0	6–6	2–3	0 / 18	12–18	40%
Career statistics
	2017	2018	2019	2020	2021	2022	2023	2024	2025	2026	Career		
Tournaments	1	1	0	2	7	20	17	7	20	4	79		
Titles / Finals	0 / 0	0 / 0	0 / 0	0 / 0	0 / 0	0 / 0	0 / 2	1 / 1	0 / 0	0 / 0	1 / 3		
Overall win–loss	1–1	0–1	0–0	2–2	2–7	21–25	15–17	5–6	15–20	2–4	63–83		
Win %	50%	0%	0%	50%	22%	46%	47%	45%	43%	33%	43.15%		
Year-end ranking	187	261	359	165	64	60	73	76	94		$4,437,897		

== ATP Tour finals ==
=== Singles: 3 (1 title, 2 runner-ups) ===
Legend Grand Slam (0–0) ATP Masters 1000 (0–0) ATP 500 (0–0) ATP 250 (1–2)	Finals by surface Hard (1–2) Clay (0–0) Grass (0–0)	Finals by setting Outdoor (0–1) Indoor (1–1)

Result	W–L	Date	Tournament	Tier	Surface	Opponent	Score
Loss	0–1	Jan 2023	Maharashtra Open, India	ATP 250	Hard	(Netherlands) Tallon Griekspoor	6–4, 5–7, 3–6
Loss	0–2	Feb 2023	Open 13, France	ATP 250	Hard (i)	(Poland) Hubert Hurkacz	3–6, 6–7^{(4–7)}
Win	1–2	Nov 2024	Moselle Open, France	ATP 250	Hard (i)	(United Kingdom) Cameron Norrie	7–6^{(8–6)}, 6–4

=== Doubles: 2 (1 title, 1 runner-up) ===
Legend Grand Slam (0–0) ATP Masters 1000 (0–0) ATP 500 (0–0) ATP 250 (1–1)	Finals by surface Hard (1–1) Clay (0–0) Grass (0–0)	Finals by setting Outdoor (0–0) Indoor (1–1)

Result	W–L	Date	Tournament	Tier	Surface	Partner	Opponents	Score
Loss	0–1	Feb 2019	Open Sud de France, France	ATP 250	Hard (i)	(France) Antoine Hoang	(Croatia) Ivan Dodig (France) Édouard Roger-Vasselin	3–6, 3–6
Win	1–1	Feb 2025	Open 13, France	ATP 250	Hard (i)	(France) Pierre-Hugues Herbert	(Belgium) Sander Gillé (Poland) Jan Zieliński	6–3, 6–4

== ATP Challenger and ITF Tour finals ==
=== Singles: 36 (22 titles, 14 runner-ups) ===
Legend ATP Challenger Tour (11–7) ITF Futures/WTT (11–7)	Finals by surface Hard (–) Clay (–)

Result	W–L	Date	Tournament	Tier	Surface	Opponent	Score
Loss	0–1	Jul 2015	Portugal F10, Castelo Branco	Futures	Hard	(Spain) Pablo Vivero González	3–6, 6–7^{(4–7)}
Win	1–1	Aug 2015	Turkey F33, İzmir	Futures	Hard	(Turkey) Cem İlkel	7–6^{(7–2)}, 7–5
Loss	1–2	Apr 2016	Qatar F2, Doha	Futures	Hard	(Kazakhstan) Alexander Bublik	6–7^{(4–7)}, 6–7^{(7–9)}
Loss	1–3	Sep 2016	Tunisia F22, Hammamet	Futures	Clay	(France) Jules Okala	4–6, 3–6
Win	2–3	Oct 2016	Tunisia F25, Hammamet	Futures	Clay	(Argentina) Mariano Kestelboim	7–6^{(7–3)}, 6–2
Loss	2–4	Oct 2016	Tunisia F26, Hammamet	Futures	Clay	(Lithuania) Laurynas Grigelis	4–6, 4–6
Win	3–4	Oct 2016	Tunisia F27, Hammamet	Futures	Clay	(Spain) Javier Martí	7–5, 6–3
Win	4–4	Nov 2016	Egypt F31, Sharm El Sheikh	Futures	Hard	(Austria) Dennis Novak	4–6, 6–3, 6–1
Win	5–4	Feb 2017	Egypt F6, Sharm El Sheikh	Futures	Hard	(Slovakia) Patrik Nema	7–5, 7–6^{(7–4)}
Loss	5–5	Apr 2017	Greece F5, Heraklion	Futures	Hard	(Czech Republic) Petr Michnev	2–6, 5–7
Win	6–5	May 2017	Tunisia F17, Hammamet	Futures	Clay	(Argentina) Juan Ignacio Galarza	6–7^{(4–7)}, 6–0, 6–1
Win	7–5	May 2017	France F22, Nevers	Futures	Hard	(Czech Republic) Marek Jaloviec	6–2, 3–6, 7–5
Loss	0–1	Mar 2018	Drummondville, Canada	Challenger	Hard	(United States) Denis Kudla	0–6, 5–7
Win	8–5	Jun 2019	M25+H Toulouse, France	WTT	Clay	(France) Hugo Gaston	6–4, 6–4
Loss	8–6	Aug 2019	M25 Schlieren, Switzerland	WTT	Clay	(Germany) Daniel Masur	4–6, 2–6
Win	9–6	Sep 2019	M25 Madrid, Spain	WTT	Clay	(Colombia) Alejandro González	6–2, 7–6^{(7–5)}
Loss	9–7	Oct 2019	M25+H Rodez, France	WTT	Hard	(France) Hugo Gaston	6–7^{(4–7)}, 3–6
Win	10–7	Feb 2020	M25 Nonthaburi, Thailand	WTT	Hard	(Germany) Sebastian Fanselow	6–4, 6–1
Loss	0–2	Feb 2020	Bangalore, India	Challenger	Hard	(Australia) James Duckworth	4–6, 4–6
Win	11–7	Mar 2020	M25 Potchefstroom, South Africa	WTT	Hard	(Germany) Tobias Simon	7–6^{(14–12)}, 6–4
Loss	0–3	Jan 2021	Istanbul, Turkey	Challenger	Hard (i)	(France) Arthur Rinderknech	6–4, 6–7^{(1–7)}, 6–7^{(3–7)}
Win	1–3	Feb 2021	Potchefstroom, South Africa	Challenger	Hard	(United Kingdom) Liam Broady	7–5, 6–4
Win	2–3	May 2021	Ostrava, Czech Republic	Challenger	Clay	(Argentina) Renzo Olivo	6–4, 6–4
Win	3–3	Jul 2021	Segovia, Spain	Challenger	Hard	(Netherlands) Tim van Rijthoven	7–6^{(12–10)}, 3–6, 6–4.
Win	4–3	Aug 2021	Saint-Tropez, France	Challenger	Hard	(Australia) Christopher O'Connell	6–7^{(10–12)}, 6–1, 0–0 ret.
Win	5–3	Sep 2021	Cassis, France	Challenger	Hard	(France) Lucas Pouille	7–6^{(7–4)}, 6–4
Win	6–3	Sep 2021	Rennes, France	Challenger	Hard (i)	(Germany) Mats Moraing	7–6^{(7–3)}, 7–6^{(7–3)}
Win	7–3	Feb 2022	Cherbourg, France	Challenger	Hard (i)	(France) Constant Lestienne	6–4, 2–6, 6–4
Win	8–3	Jun 2022	Aix-en-Provence, France	Challenger	Clay	(France) Grégoire Barrère	6–2, 6–4
Loss	8–4	Sep 2023	Rennes, France	Challenger	Hard (i)	(United States) Maxime Cressy	3–6, 0–2 ret.
Loss	8–5	Oct 2023	Brest, France	Challenger	Hard (i)	(Spain) Pedro Martinez	6–7^{(6–8)}, 6–7^{(1–7)}
Win	9–5	Jul 2024	Winnipeg, Canada	Challenger	Hard	(Japan) Sho Shimabukuro	5–7, 6–1, 6–4
Win	10–5	Oct 2024	Roanne, France	Challenger	Hard (i)	(France) Matteo Martineau	7–5, 6–1
Win	11–5	Oct 2024	Saint-Brieuc, France	Challenger	Hard (i)	(France) Lucas Pouille	6–2, 6–3
Loss	11–6	Oct 2024	Brest, France	Challenger	Hard (i)	(Finland) Otto Virtanen	4–6, 6–4, 6–7^{(6–8)}
Loss	11–7	Feb 2026	Pau, France	Challenger	Hard (i)	(Belgium) Raphaël Collignon	6–7^{(5–7)}, 1–6

=== Doubles: 42 (27 titles, 15 runner-ups) ===
Legend ATP Challenger Tour (3–2) ITF Futures/WTT (24–13)	Finals by surface Hard (–) Clay (–)

Result	W–L	Date	Tournament	Tier	Surface	Partner	Opponent	Score
Win	1–0	Oct 2014	Greece F9, Heraklion	Futures	Hard	(France) Quentin Halys	(Mexico) Mauricio Astorga (Mexico) Alberto Rojas-Maldonado	6–2, 6–4
Loss	1–1	May 2015	Turkey F18, Antalya	Futures	Hard	(France) Fabien Reboul	(Austria) Lucas Miedler (Austria) Maximilian Neuchrist	2–6, 3–6
Loss	1–2	Jul 2015	Portugal F9, Castelo Branco	Futures	Clay	(France) Grégoire Jacq	(Spain) Javier Pulgar-García (Spain) Borja Rodríguez Manzano	4–6, 6–4, [9–11]
Win	2–2	Jul 2015	Portugal F10, Castelo Branco	Futures	Clay	(Portugal) Romain Barbosa	(France) Grégoire Jacq (France) Antoine Hoang	7–6^{(10–8)}, 6–7^{(7–9)}, [10–7]
Loss	2–3	Aug 2015	Portugal F11, Castelo Branco	Futures	Clay	(Portugal) Romain Barbosa	(Portugal) Gonçalo Falcão (Portugal) Gonçalo Pereira	3–6, 6–2, [5–10]
Win	3–3	Aug 2015	Turkey F32, Sakarya	Futures	Hard	(France) Grégoire Jacq	(Israel) Yannai Barkai (Israel) Alon Elia	6–1, 6–2
Loss	3–4	Aug 2015	Turkey F33, İzmir	Futures	Clay	(France) Grégoire Jacq	(Spain) Jordi Vives (Bolivia) Federico Zeballos	6–7^{(0–7)}, 7–6^{(8–6)}, [7–10]
Win	4–4	Oct 2015	Tunisia F26, Port El Kantaoui	Futures	Hard	(France) Fabien Reboul	(Lithuania) Lukas Mugevičius (Spain) Roberto Ortega Olmedo	4–6, 6–4, [10–8]
Win	5–4	Oct 2015	Tunisia F27, Port El Kantaoui	Futures	Hard	(France) Fabien Reboul	(Tunisia) Aziz Dougaz (Tunisia) Anis Ghorbel	6–2, 6–2
Win	6–4	Oct 2015	Tunisia F29, Port El Kantaoui	Futures	Hard	(Spain) Roberto Ortega Olmedo	(Tunisia) Anis Ghorbel (Italy) Francesco Vilardo	6–0, 6–3
Loss	6–5	Jan 2016	France F1, Bagnoles-de-l'Orne	Futures	Clay (i)	(France) Grégoire Jacq	(France) Corentin Denolly (France) Alexandre Müller	6–2, 1–6, [6–10]
Loss	6–6	Jan 2016	France F2, Bressuire	Futures	Hard (i)	(France) Grégoire Jacq	(Belgium) Sander Gillé (Belgium) Joran Vliegen	6–7^{(1–7)}, 5–7
Win	7–6	Mar 2016	France F5, Balma	Futures	Hard (i)	(France) Fabien Reboul	(Slovakia) Martin Beran (France) Maxime Tabatruong	7–5, 6–3
Win	8–6	Apr 2016	Qatar F1, Doha	Futures	Hard	(Switzerland) Antoine Bellier	(United Kingdom) Daniel Cox (Sweden) Milos Sekulic	6–3, 6–2
Win	9–6	Apr 2016	Qatar F2, Doha	Futures	Hard	(Switzerland) Antoine Bellier	(Tunisia) Anis Ghorbel (France) Tak Khunn Wang	7–6^{(7–5)}, 6–3
Win	10–6	Apr 2016	Qatar F3, Doha	Futures	Hard	(Switzerland) Antoine Bellier	(Tunisia) Anis Ghorbel (France) Tak Khunn Wang	6–2, 1–6, [11–9]
Win	11–6	May 2016	Tunisia F18, Hammamet	Futures	Clay	(Tunisia) Anis Ghorbel	(Spain) Sergio Martos Gornés (Spain) Oriol Roca Batalla	6–3, 7–6^{(8–6)}
Win	12–6	Jun 2016	France F10, Mont-de-Marsan	Futures	Clay	(France) Grégoire Jacq	(Monaco) Romain Arneodo (Monaco) Benjamin Balleret	7–6^{(7–4)}, 7–6^{(7–1)}
Win	13–6	Jul 2016	Italy F21, Gubbio	Futures	Clay	(France) Grégoire Jacq	(Italy) Alessandro Colella (Italy) Cristian Carli	6–2, 6–1
Loss	13–7	Aug 2016	Netherlands F5, Oldenzaal	Futures	Clay	(France) Antoine Hoang	(Turkey) Altuğ Çelikbilek (Netherlands) Niels Lootsma	3–6, 3–6
Win	14–7	Aug 2016	Netherlands F6, Rotterdam	Futures	Clay	(Turkey) Altuğ Çelikbilek	(Netherlands) Bobbie De Goeijen (Netherlands) Glenn Smits	6–3, 6–3
Loss	14–8	Sep 2016	Tunisia F22, Hammamet	Futures	Clay	(France) Fabien Reboul	(Italy) Franco Agamenone (Argentina) Mariano Kestelboim	2–6, 6–2, [7–10]
Win	15–8	Sep 2016	Tunisia F23, Hammamet	Futures	Clay	(France) Fabien Reboul	(Italy) Franco Agamenone (Argentina) Mariano Kestelboim	2–6, 7–5, [10–4]
Win	16–8	Oct 2016	Tunisia F25, Hammamet	Futures	Clay	(Austria) Bernd Kossler	(Argentina) Eduardo Agustín Torre (Argentina) Matias Zukas	6–3, 6–3
Win	17–8	Oct 2016	Tunisia F26, Hammamet	Futures	Clay	(France) Mathias Bourgue	(Lithuania) Laurynas Grigelis (Spain) David Pérez Sanz	walkover
Loss	17–9	Oct 2016	Egypt F30, Sharm El Sheikh	Futures	Hard	(United Kingdom) Jonathan Gray	(Egypt) Karim-Mohamed Maamoun (Ukraine) Vladyslav Manafov	4–6, 2–6
Loss	17–10	Jan 2017	Tunisia F2, Hammamet	Futures	Clay	(France) Johan Tatlot	(France) Jordan Ubiergo (France) Thibault Venturino	5–7, 1–6
Win	18–10	Mar 2017	Greece F3, Heraklion	Futures	Hard	(Chile) Tomás Barrios Vera	(Russia) Yaraslav Shyla (Russia) Dzmitry Zhyrmont	4–6, 7–6^{(7–5)}, [10–7]
Win	19–10	Apr 2017	Greece F5, Heraklion	Futures	Hard	(France) Rémi Boutillier	(United States) Nick Chappell (United States) Robert Galloway	6–3, 6–7^{(8–10)}, [10–6]
Loss	19–11	Apr 2017	Tunisia F16, Hammamet	Futures	Clay	(France) Antoine Hoang	(Bosnia and Herzegovina) Darko Bojanović (Sweden) Dragoș Nicolae Mădăraș	6–2, 4–6, [9–11]
Win	20–11	Jul 2017	France F13, Montauban	Futures	Clay	(France) Grégoire Jacq	(Spain) Adria Mas Mascolo (Spain) Pol Toledo Bagué	6–1, 3–6, [10–7]
Win	21–11	Oct 2017	France F22, Nevers	Futures	Hard (i)	(France) Antoine Hoang	(United States) Alex Lawson (United States) Nathaniel Lammons	7–6^{(7–5)}, 6–4
Win	22–11	Jun 2019	M25 Toulouse, France	WTT	Clay	(France) Grégoire Jacq	(France) Jonathan Kanar (France) Laurent Lokoli	2–6, 6–2, [10–4]
Loss	22–12	Oct 2019	M25 Rodez, France	WTT	Hard (i)	(France) Grégoire Jacq	(France) Dan Added (France) Albano Olivetti	5–7, 7–6^{(7–1)}, [4–10]
Loss	22–13	Nov 2019	M25 Saint-Dizier, France	WTT	Hard (i)	(France) Corentin Denolly	(France) Antoine Cornut-Chauvinc (France) Harold Mayot	4–6, 6–0, [8–10]
Win	23–13	Feb 2020	M25 Nonthaburi, Thailand	WTT	Hard	(France) Corentin Denolly	(Germany) Sebastian Fanselow (Egypt) Karim-Mohamed Maamoun	6–2, 6–4
Win	1–0	Feb 2020	Pau, France	Challenger	Hard (i)	(France) Antoine Hoang	(Italy) Simone Bolelli (Romania) Florin Mergea	6–3, 6–2
Win	24–13	Mar 2020	M25 Potchefstroom, South Africa	WTT	Hard	(France) Matteo Martineau	(Republic of Ireland) Simon Carr (France) Corentin Denolly	6–4, 6–2
Win	2–0	Mar 2021	Lille, France	Challenger	Hard (i)	(France) Antoine Hoang	(France) Dan Added (Belgium) Michael Geerts	6–3, 6–1
Loss	2–1	Jun 2021	Nottingham, United Kingdom	Challenger	Grass	(France) Antoine Hoang	(Australia) Marc Polmans (Australia) Matt Reid	4–6, 6–4, [8–10]
Loss	2–2	Apr 2024	Barletta, Italy	Challenger	Clay	(France) Théo Arribagé	(Czech Republic) Zdeněk Kolář (Chinese Taipei) Tseng Chun-hsin	6-1, 3-6, [7-10]
Win	3–2	Sep 2024	Orléans, France	Challenger	Hard (i)	(France) Sascha Gueymard Wayenburg	(France) Manuel Guinard (France) Grégoire Jacq	7–6^{(9–7)}, 4–6, [10-5]

== Junior Grand Slam finals ==
=== Doubles: 1 (1 title) ===
Result	Year	Tournament	Surface	Partner	Opponents	Score
Win	2014	French Open	Clay	(France) Quentin Halys	(Austria) Lucas Miedler (Australia) Akira Santillan	6–3, 6–3

== Record against top-10 players ==
Bonzi's record against those who have been ranked in the top 10, with active players in boldface. Only ATP Tour main draw matches are considered:

Player	Years	MP	Record	Win%	Hard	Clay	Grass	Last match
Number 1 ranked players								
(Russia) **Daniil Medvedev**	2017	1	1–0	100%	–	1–0	–	Won (5–7, 6–4, 6–1, 3–1 ret.) at 2017 French Open
(Italy) **Jannik Sinner**	2020–2023	3	0–3	0%	0–2	0–1	–	Lost (2–6, 6–3, 1–6) at 2023 Rotterdam
Number 2 ranked players								
(Norway) **Casper Ruud**	2024	1	1–0	100%	1–0	–	–	Won (6–4, 6–4) at 2024 Metz
Number 3 ranked players								
(Austria) Dominic Thiem	2022	1	1–0	100%	–	1–0	–	Won (6–3, 7–6^{(11–9)}) at 2022 Estoril
(Croatia) **Marin Čilić**	2021	1	0–1	0%	–	–	0–1	Lost (4–6, 6–3, 3–6, 6–7^{(5–7)}) at 2021 Wimbledon Championships
(Greece) **Stefanos Tsitsipas**	2022–2023	3	0–3	0%	–	0–1	0–2	Lost (1–4 ret.) at 2023 Monte Carlo
Number 4 ranked players								
(Denmark) **Holger Rune**	2022	1	0–1	0%	0–1	–	–	Lost (4–6, 1–4 ret.) at 2022 Metz
Number 5 ranked players								
(Russia) **Andrey Rublev**	2022	1	0–1	0%	0–1	–	–	Lost (3–6, 6–4, 3–6) at 2022 Marseille
Number 6 ranked players								
(Poland) **Hubert Hurkacz**	2023	1	0–1	0%	0–1	–	–	Lost (3–6, 6–7^{(4–7)}) at 2023 Marseille
Number 7 ranked players								
(Belgium) **David Goffin**	2021–2022	3	0–3	0%	0–3	–	–	Lost (3–6, 7–5, 3–6) at 2022 Davis Cup
Number 8 ranked players								
(United States) John Isner	2022	2	0–2	0%	0–1	–	0–1	Lost (6–7^{(11–13)}, 6–3, 6–7^{(4–7)}) at 2022 Cincinnati
(Russia) **Karen Khachanov**	2021–2022	2	0–2	0%	0–1	0–1	–	Lost (4–6, 0–6, 5–7) at 2022 Australian Open
Number 10 ranked players								
(Spain) **Pablo Carreño Busta**	2023	1	1–0	100%	1–0	–	–	Won (4–6, 4–6, 7–6^{(7–5)}, 6–1, 7–6^{(10–4)}) at 2023 Australian Open
(France) **Lucas Pouille**	2021	1	1–0	100%	1–0	–	–	Won (7–6^{(8–6)}, 6–2) at 2021 Montpellier
(Canada) **Denis Shapovalov**	2022	1	1–0	100%	–	–	1–0	Won (6–4, 6–1) at 2022 Mallorca
(United States) **Frances Tiafoe**	2022	2	0–2	0%	0–1	0–1	–	Lost (7–6^{(8–6)}, 5–7, 3–6) at 2022 Montréal
**Total**	**2017–2024**	**25**	**6–19**	**24%**	**3–11 (21%)**	**2–4 (33%)**	**1–4 (20%)**	*** Statistics correct as of 7 November 2024.**

== Wins over top 10 players ==
- Bonzi has a 3–6 record against players who were, at the time the match was played, ranked in the top 10.

Season	2024	2025	Total
Wins	1	2	3

#	Player	Rk	Event	Surface	Rd	Score	Rk
2024
1.	(Norway) Casper Ruud	7	Moselle Open, France	Hard (i)	2R	6–4, 6–4	124
2025
2.	Daniil Medvedev	9	Wimbledon, United Kingdom	Grass	1R	7–6^{(7–2)}, 3–6, 7–6^{(7–3)}, 6–2	64
3.	(Italy) Lorenzo Musetti	10	Cincinnati Open, United States	Hard	2R	5–7, 6–4, 7–6^{(7–4)}	63
