= Brest Challenger =

Brest Open
- 2026 Brest Open

ATP Challenger Tour
- Event name: Brest Open Groupe Vert
- Location: Brest, France
- Venue: Brest Arena
- Category: Challenger 100 (2023-)
- Surface: Hard (Indoor)
- Draw: 32S/32Q/16D
- Prize money: €145,250 (2025), €120,950 (2024)
- Website: Website

The Brest Open Groupe Vert (formerly Open de Brest Crédit Agricole) is a professional tennis tournament played on hardcourts. It is currently part of the ATP Challenger Tour. It is held annually in Brest, France since 2015.

== Past finals ==
=== Singles ===
Year	Champion	Runner-up	Score
2026	(France) Moïse Kouamé	(United States) Martin Damm	6–4, 6–7^{(5–7)}, 7–6^{(7–4)}
2025	(France) Hugo Gaston	(United States) Eliot Spizzirri	2–6, 6–2, 6–1
2024	(Finland) Otto Virtanen	(France) Benjamin Bonzi	6–4, 4–6, 7–6^{(8–6)}
2023	(Spain) Pedro Martínez	(France) Benjamin Bonzi	7–6^{(8–6)}, 7–6^{(7–1)}
2022	(France) Grégoire Barrère	(France) Luca Van Assche	6–3, 6–3
2021	(United States) Brandon Nakashima	(Portugal) João Sousa	6–3, 6–3
2020	Not held		
2019	(France) Ugo Humbert	(Russia) Evgeny Donskoy	6–2, 6–3
2018	(Poland) Hubert Hurkacz	(Lithuania) Ričardas Berankis	7–5, 6–1
2017	(France) Corentin Moutet	(Greece) Stefanos Tsitsipas	6–2, 7–6^{(10–8)}
2016	(Slovakia) Norbert Gombos	(Belgium) Yannik Reuter	7–5, 6–2
2015	(Croatia) Ivan Dodig	(France) Benoît Paire	7–5, 6–1

=== Doubles ===
Year	Champions	Runners-up	Score
2026	(Ecuador) Gonzalo Escobar (India) Niki Kaliyanda Poonacha	(India) Sriram Balaji (United States) Evan King	7–6^{(7–4)}, 6–7^{(4–7)}, [10–7]
2025	(Belgium) Sander Gillé (Netherlands) Sem Verbeek	(France) Théo Arribagé (France) Albano Olivetti	7–6^{(7–5)}, 7–6^{(7–4)}
2024	(Colombia) Nicolás Barrientos (Tunisia) Skander Mansouri	(Switzerland) Jakub Paul (Czech Republic) Matěj Vocel	7–5, 4–6, [10–5]
2023	(India) Yuki Bhambri (United Kingdom) Julian Cash	(United States) Robert Galloway (France) Albano Olivetti	6–7^{(5–7)}, 6–3, [10–5]
2022	(Norway) Viktor Durasovic (Finland) Otto Virtanen	(Sweden) Filip Bergevi (Greece) Petros Tsitsipas	6–4, 6–4
2021	(France) Sadio Doumbia (France) Fabien Reboul	(Italy) Salvatore Caruso (Italy) Federico Gaio	4–6, 6–3, [10–3]
2020	Not held		
2019	(Ukraine) Denys Molchanov (Belarus) Andrei Vasilevski	(Italy) Andrea Vavassori (Spain) David Vega Hernández	6–3, 6–1
2018	(Belgium) Sander Gillé (Belgium) Joran Vliegen	(India) Leander Paes (Mexico) Miguel Ángel Reyes-Varela	3–6, 6–4, [10–2]
2017	(Netherlands) Sander Arends (Croatia) Antonio Šančić	(United Kingdom) Scott Clayton (India) Divij Sharan	6–4, 7–5
2016	(Netherlands) Sander Arends (Poland) Mateusz Kowalczyk	(Switzerland) Marco Chiudinelli (Italy) Luca Vanni	6–7(2), 6–3, [10–5]
2015	(Netherlands) Wesley Koolhof (Netherlands) Matwé Middelkoop	(United Kingdom) Ken Skupski (United Kingdom) Neal Skupski	3–6, 6–4, [10–6]
