= 2026 Thionville Open – Doubles =

Doubles
- 2026 Thionville Open

Final
- Champions: Ivan Liutarevich (Poland) Filip Pieczonka
- Runners-up: (United Kingdom) Joshua Paris (France) Luca Sanchez
- Score: 7–6^{(13–11)}, 7–6^{(7–5)}

Events
Singles	Doubles
- Thionville Open

Jakub Paul and David Pel were the defending champions but only Paul chose to defend his title, partnering Matěj Vocel. They lost in the first round to Ivan Liutarevich and Filip Pieczonka.

Liutarevich and Pieczonka won the title after defeating Joshua Paris and Luca Sanchez 7–6^{(13–11)}, 7–6^{(7–5)} in the final.

== Seeds ==
1. (India) Sriram Balaji / (Austria) Neil Oberleitner (semifinals)
2. (Switzerland) Jakub Paul / (Czech Republic) Matěj Vocel (first round)
3. (United Kingdom) Joshua Paris / (France) Luca Sanchez (final)
4. (Canada) Cleeve Harper / (United Kingdom) David Stevenson (semifinals)

== Draw ==
Key

- Q = Qualifier
- WC = Wild card
- LL = Lucky loser
- Alt = Alternate
- ITF = ITF entry
- PR = Protected ranking
- SR = Special ranking
- SE = Special exempt
- JE = Junior exempt
- JR = Junior Accelerator Programme entrant
- CO = College Accelerator Programme entrant
- NG = Next Gen Accelerator Program entrant
- w/o = Walkover
- r = Retired
- d = Defaulted

First round
1	(India) S Balaji (Austria) N Oberleitner	6	6
Alt	(Switzerland) R Bertola (France) G Blancaneaux	3	4
(Poland) K Drzewiecki (Poland) P Matuszewski	6^{6}	4
(Israel) D Cukierman (United States) T Hilderbrand	7^{8}	6
3	(United Kingdom) J Paris (France) L Sanchez	6^{7}	6	[10]
WC	(Luxembourg) A Knaff (France) Arthur Nagel	7^{9}	3	[5]
(Australia) B Bayldon (Australia) C Puttergill	7^{7}	6
(Spain) Í Cervantes (France) G Jacq	6^{5}	1
(Czech Republic) A Paulson (Czech Republic) M Vrbenský	6	6^{2}	[10]
(Poland) S Kielan (Romania) B Pavel	3	7^{7}	[8]
(Netherlands) M Hermans (Netherlands) T Loof	2	4
4	(Canada) C Harper (United Kingdom) D Stevenson	6	6
(United States) N Lammons (United States) J Withrow	7^{7}	3	[11]
(Spain) S Martos Gornés (India) VS Prashanth	6^{5}	6	[13]
I Liutarevich (Poland) F Pieczonka	6	7^{7}
2	(Switzerland) J Paul (Czech Republic) M Vocel	3	6^{3}

Quarterfinals
1	(India) S Balaji (Austria) N Oberleitner	6	6
(Israel) D Cukierman (United States) T Hilderbrand	4	1
3	(United Kingdom) J Paris (France) L Sanchez	6	6
(Australia) B Bayldon (Australia) C Puttergill	2	3
(Czech Republic) A Paulson (Czech Republic) M Vrbenský	4	4
4	(Canada) C Harper (United Kingdom) D Stevenson	6	6
(Spain) S Martos Gornés (India) VS Prashanth	4	2
I Liutarevich (Poland) F Pieczonka	6	6

Semifinals
1	(India) S Balaji (Austria) N Oberleitner	3	5
3	(United Kingdom) J Paris (France) L Sanchez	6	7
4	(Canada) C Harper (United Kingdom) D Stevenson	6^{5}	1
I Liutarevich (Poland) F Pieczonka	7^{7}	6

Final
3	(United Kingdom) J Paris (France) L Sanchez	6^{11}	6^{5}
I Liutarevich (Poland) F Pieczonka	7^{13}	7^{7}
