= 2025 Thionville Open – Doubles =

Doubles
- 2025 Thionville Open

Final
- Champions: (Switzerland) Jakub Paul (Netherlands) David Pel
- Runners-up: (France) Matteo Martineau (France) Luca Sanchez
- Score: 6–1, 6–4

Events
Singles	Doubles
- Thionville Open

This was the first edition of the tournament.

Jakub Paul and David Pel won the title after defeating Matteo Martineau and Luca Sanchez 6–1, 6–4 in the final.

== Seeds ==
1. (Monaco) Romain Arneodo / (Germany) Andreas Mies (withdrew)
2. (Romania) Victor Vlad Cornea / (France) Jonathan Eysseric (first round)
3. (Switzerland) Jakub Paul / (Netherlands) David Pel (champions)
4. Ivan Liutarevich / (Netherlands) Mick Veldheer (semifinals)

== Draw ==
Key

- Q = Qualifier
- WC = Wild card
- LL = Lucky loser
- Alt = Alternate
- ITF = ITF entry
- PR = Protected ranking
- SR = Special ranking
- SE = Special exempt
- JE = Junior exempt
- JR = Junior Accelerator Programme entrant
- CO = College Accelerator Programme entrant
- NG = Next Gen Accelerator Program entrant
- w/o = Walkover
- r = Retired
- d = Defaulted

=== Draw ===
First round
E Gerasimov; A Kachmazov	6	6^{5}	[10]
WC	(France) Lilian Marmousez (France) Antoine Vincent	3	7^{7}	[7]
4	I Liutarevich (Netherlands) M Veldheer	6	6
(Poland) S Walków (United Kingdom) M Willis	3	4
Alt	(South Africa) P Henning (South Africa) Kris van Wyk	3	4
(Serbia) I Sabanov (Serbia) M Sabanov	6	6
(Slovakia) L Pokorný (Kazakhstan) D Yevseyev	6	7^{7}
(France) S Gueymard Wayenburg (France) L Van Assche	3	6^{4}
(France) D Added (France) A Bouquier	7^{7}	4	[8]
3	(Switzerland) J Paul (Netherlands) D Pel	6^{3}	6	[10]
(Ukraine) V Sachko (Kazakhstan) B Zhukayev	6	4	[7]
(Finland) P Niklas-Salminen (Finland) E Ruusuvuori	4	6	[10]
(Japan) K Uesugi (Spain) D Vega Hernández	6	7
2	(Romania) V Cornea (France) J Eysseric	1	5

Quarterfinals
(France) M Martineau (France) L Sanchez	6	4	[10]
E Gerasimov; A Kachmazov	0	6	[7]
4	I Liutarevich (Netherlands) M Veldheer	6	6
(Serbia) I Sabanov (Serbia) M Sabanov	2	2
(Slovakia) L Pokorný (Kazakhstan) D Yevseyev	4	3
3	(Switzerland) J Paul (Netherlands) D Pel	6	6
(Finland) P Niklas-Salminen (Finland) E Ruusuvuori	5	6	[8]
(Japan) K Uesugi (Spain) D Vega Hernández	7	2	[10]

Semifinals
(France) M Martineau (France) L Sanchez	7^{7}	6^{7}	[10]
4	I Liutarevich (Netherlands) M Veldheer	6^{4}	7^{9}	[5]
3	(Switzerland) J Paul (Netherlands) D Pel	6	6
(Japan) K Uesugi (Spain) D Vega Hernández	3	4

Final
(France) M Martineau (France) L Sanchez	1	4
3	(Switzerland) J Paul (Netherlands) D Pel	6	6
