= 2025 Thionville Open =

- Date: 3 – 9 March
- Edition: 1st
- Surface: Hard
- Location: Thionville, France

Champions

Singles
- (Croatia) Borna Ćorić

Doubles
- (Switzerland) Jakub Paul / (Netherlands) David Pel
- Thionville Open

The 2025 Thionville Open was a professional tennis tournament played on hardcourts. It was the first edition of the tournament which was part of the 2025 ATP Challenger Tour. It took place in Thionville, France between 3 and 9 March 2025.

== Singles main-draw entrants ==
=== Seeds ===
Country	Player	Rank^{1}	Seed
CRO	Borna Ćorić	143	1
BEL	Alexander Blockx	153	2
FRA	Luca Van Assche	154	3
CAN	Liam Draxl	175	4
JPN	Yuta Shimizu	180	5
FRA	Titouan Droguet	190	6
	Alibek Kachmazov	192	7
GBR	Jan Choinski	195	8

- ^{1} Rankings are as of 24 February 2025.

=== Other entrants ===
The following players received wildcards into the singles main draw:

- (France) Dan Added
- (France) Felix Balshaw
- (France) Tom Paris

The following players received entry into the singles main draw as alternates:

- (Germany) Max Hans Rehberg
- (Kazakhstan) Denis Yevseyev

The following players received entry from the qualifying draw:

- (France) Matisse Bobichon
- (Germany) Florian Broska
- (South Africa) Philip Henning
- (Switzerland) Jakub Paul
- (Ukraine) Vitaliy Sachko
- (Germany) Henri Squire

== Champions ==
=== Singles ===
- (Croatia) Borna Ćorić def. (France) Arthur Bouquier 6–4, 6–4.

=== Doubles ===
- (Switzerland) Jakub Paul / (Netherlands) David Pel def. (France) Matteo Martineau / (France) Luca Sanchez 6–1, 6–4.
