= 2022 Challenger Rio de Janeiro – Singles =

Singles
- 2022 Challenger Rio de Janeiro

Final
- Champion: (Italy) Marco Cecchinato
- Runner-up: (Germany) Yannick Hanfmann
- Score: 4–6, 6–4, 6–3

Events
Singles	Doubles
Challenger Rio de Janeiro	· 2023 →

This was the first edition of the tournament.

Marco Cecchinato won the title after defeating Yannick Hanfmann 4–6, 6–4, 6–3 in the final.

== Seeds ==
1. (Argentina) Federico Coria (semifinals)
2. (Peru) Juan Pablo Varillas (quarterfinals)
3. (Italy) Marco Cecchinato (champion)
4. (Argentina) Camilo Ugo Carabelli (first round)
5. (Brazil) Felipe Meligeni Alves (first round)
6. (France) Alexandre Müller (semifinals)
7. (Argentina) Juan Manuel Cerúndolo (quarterfinals)
8. (Germany) Yannick Hanfmann (final)

== Draw ==
Key

- Q = Qualifier
- WC = Wild card
- LL = Lucky loser
- Alt = Alternate
- ITF = ITF entry
- PR = Protected ranking
- SR = Special ranking
- SE = Special exempt
- JE = Junior exempt
- JR = Junior Accelerator Programme entrant
- CO = College Accelerator Programme entrant
- NG = Next Gen Accelerator Program entrant
- w/o = Walkover
- r = Retired
- d = Defaulted

=== Finals ===
Semifinals
1	(Argentina) Federico Coria	6	3	3
3	(Italy) Marco Cecchinato	1	6	6
6	(France) Alexandre Müller	3	3
8	(Germany) Yannick Hanfmann	6	6

Final
3	(Italy) Marco Cecchinato	4	6	6
8	(Germany) Yannick Hanfmann	6	4	3

=== Top half ===
First round
1	(Argentina) F Coria	6	6
WC	(Brazil) Gustavo Almeida	1	1
Alt	(Argentina) JB Torres	7^{7}	6
Q	(Argentina) JP Paz	6^{5}	0
Q	(Switzerland) R Bertola	6	6^{6}	6
(Italy) A Giannessi	3	7^{8}	4
(Argentina) TA Tirante	1	7	6^{7}
7	(Argentina) JM Cerúndolo	6	5	7^{9}
3	(Italy) M Cecchinato	6	6
Alt	(Argentina) G Villanueva	4	2
Q	(Switzerland) J Paul	6	6
WC	(Brazil) J Fonseca	2	3
(Argentina) F Comesaña	0	1
(Brazil) M Pucinelli de Almeida	6	6
Q	(France) G Mpetshi Perricard	6^{3}	7^{7}	7^{7}
5	(Brazil) F Meligeni Alves	7^{7}	6^{5}	6^{5}

Second round
1	(Argentina) F Coria	3	6	7^{7}
Alt	(Argentina) JB Torres	6	4	6^{5}
Q	(Switzerland) R Bertola	2	2
7	(Argentina) JM Cerúndolo	6	6
3	(Italy) M Cecchinato	7	6
Q	(Switzerland) J Paul	5	1
(Brazil) M Pucinelli de Almeida	6	6
Q	(France) G Mpetshi Perricard	3	3

Quarterfinals
1	(Argentina) F Coria	6^{4}	6	6
7	(Argentina) JM Cerúndolo	7^{7}	4	3
3	(Italy) M Cecchinato	7^{7}	2	7^{7}
(Brazil) M Pucinelli de Almeida	6^{3}	6	6^{3}

Semifinals
1	(Argentina) F Coria	6	3	3
3	(Italy) M Cecchinato	1	6	6

=== Bottom half ===
First round
6	(France) A Müller	6	6
(Argentina) S Rodríguez Taverna	4	4
Q	(India) S Nagal	6	6
(Brazil) D Dutra da Silva	2	3
(Argentina) R Olivo	3	6	6
(Portugal) G Elias	6	3	4
(Italy) L Darderi	4	6	6
4	(Argentina) C Ugo Carabelli	6	1	1
8	(Germany) Y Hanfmann	6	6
WC	(Brazil) JL Reis da Silva	1	1
(Kazakhstan) D Popko	3	6	3
SE	(United Kingdom) J Choinski	6	3	6
Q	(Argentina) M Navone	5	6	2
Alt	(Argentina) GA Olivieri	7	2	6
(Argentina) A Collarini	6	6^{5}	1
2	(Peru) JP Varillas	4	7^{7}	6

Second round
6	(France) A Müller	4	6	6
Q	(India) S Nagal	6	1	3
(Argentina) R Olivo	2	4
(Italy) L Darderi	6	6
8	(Germany) Y Hanfmann	6	6
SE	(United Kingdom) J Choinski	2	4
Alt	(Argentina) GA Olivieri	3	6	4
2	(Peru) JP Varillas	6	2	6

Quarterfinals
6	(France) A Müller	7	6
(Italy) L Darderi	5	3
8	(Germany) Y Hanfmann	6	6
2	(Peru) JP Varillas	3	2

Semifinals
6	(France) A Müller	3	3
8	(Germany) Y Hanfmann	6	6
