= 2025 Thionville Open – Singles =

Singles
- 2025 Thionville Open

Final
- Champion: (Croatia) Borna Ćorić
- Runner-up: (France) Arthur Bouquier
- Score: 6–4, 6–4

Events
Singles	Doubles
- Thionville Open

This was the first edition of the tournament.

Borna Ćorić won the title after defeating Arthur Bouquier 6–4, 6–4 in the final.

== Seeds ==
1. (Croatia) Borna Ćorić (champion)
2. (Belgium) Alexander Blockx (first round)
3. (France) Luca Van Assche (quarterfinals, withdrew)
4. (Canada) Liam Draxl (quarterfinals)
5. (Japan) Yuta Shimizu (first round)
6. (France) Titouan Droguet (second round)
7. Alibek Kachmazov (semifinals)
8. (United Kingdom) Jan Choinski (quarterfinals)

== Draw ==
Key

- Q = Qualifier
- WC = Wild card
- LL = Lucky loser
- Alt = Alternate
- ITF = ITF entry
- PR = Protected ranking
- SR = Special ranking
- SE = Special exempt
- JE = Junior exempt
- JR = Junior Accelerator Programme entrant
- CO = College Accelerator Programme entrant
- NG = Next Gen Accelerator Program entrant
- w/o = Walkover
- r = Retired
- d = Defaulted

=== Finals ===
Semifinals
1	(Croatia) Borna Ćorić	4	6	6
7	Alibek Kachmazov	6	4	3
(France) Arthur Bouquier	6^{2}	7^{7}	7^{7}
(Austria) Jurij Rodionov	7^{7}	6^{5}	6^{5}

Final
1	(Croatia) Borna Ćorić	6	6
(France) Arthur Bouquier	4	4

=== Top half ===
First round
1	(Croatia) B Ćorić	6	6
(United Kingdom) P Jubb	2	1
(Finland) E Ruusuvuori	6	6
Q	(France) M Bobichon	4	4
WC	(France) T Paris	2	7^{7}	6
(France) A Escoffier	6	6^{5}	4
(Tunisia) A Dougaz	6	6
5	(Japan) Y Shimizu	4	3
4	(Canada) L Draxl	6	6^{10}	6
(Norway) N Budkov Kjær	4	7^{12}	4
(Kazakhstan) B Zhukayev	7^{7}	6
Alt	(Germany) MH Rehberg	6^{4}	1
WC	(France) F Balshaw	4	3
(Lebanon) B Hassan	6	6
(Belgium) G Onclin	2	3
7	A Kachmazov	6	6

Second round
1	(Croatia) B Ćorić	6	2
(Finland) E Ruusuvuori	2	2^{r}
WC	(France) T Paris	3	4
(Tunisia) A Dougaz	6	6
4	(Canada) L Draxl	6	3	6
(Kazakhstan) B Zhukayev	3	6	3
(Lebanon) B Hassan	3	6	5
7	A Kachmazov	6	4	7

Quarterfinals
1	(Croatia) B Ćorić	6	6
(Tunisia) A Dougaz	4	2
4	(Canada) L Draxl	6^{6}	7	2
7	A Kachmazov	7^{8}	5	6

Semifinals
1	(Croatia) B Ćorić	4	6	6
7	A Kachmazov	6	4	3

=== Bottom half ===
First round
6	(France) T Droguet	4	6	6
Q	(Germany) H Squire	6	4	2
Q	(Germany) F Broska	3	4
(France) A Bouquier	6	6
WC	(France) D Added	7^{7}	6^{3}	3
(France) M Martineau	6^{5}	7^{7}	6
(France) H Grenier	4	4
3	(France) L Van Assche	6	6
8	(United Kingdom) J Choinski	6	6
Q	(South Africa) P Henning	4	3
Alt	(Kazakhstan) D Yevseyev	4	6	4
(France) S Gueymard Wayenburg	6	2	6
(Austria) J Rodionov	6	6
Q	(Ukraine) V Sachko	2	2
Q	(Switzerland) J Paul	6	7^{7}
2	(Belgium) A Blockx	1	6^{5}

Second round
6	(France) T Droguet	4	3
(France) A Bouquier	6	6
(France) M Martineau	1	6	3
3	(France) L Van Assche	6	3	6
8	(United Kingdom) J Choinski	6	6
(France) S Gueymard Wayenburg	3	1
(Austria) J Rodionov	6	6
Q	(Switzerland) J Paul	3	1

Quarterfinals
(France) A Bouquier	w/o
3	(France) L Van Assche
8	(United Kingdom) J Choinski	2	4
(Austria) J Rodionov	6	6

Semifinals
(France) A Bouquier	6^{2}	7^{7}	7^{7}
(Austria) J Rodionov	7^{7}	6^{5}	6^{5}
