= 2026 Thionville Open =

- Date: 2 – 8 March
- Edition: 2nd
- Surface: Hard
- Location: Thionville, France

Champions

Singles
- (Austria) Sebastian Ofner

Doubles
- Ivan Liutarevich / (Poland) Filip Pieczonka
- Thionville Open

The 2026 Thionville Open was a professional tennis tournament played on hardcourts. It was the second edition of the tournament which was part of the 2026 ATP Challenger Tour. It took place in Thionville, France between 2 and 8 March 2026.

== Singles main-draw entrants ==
=== Seeds ===
Country	Player	Rank^{1}	Seed
FRA	Hugo Gaston	95	1
GBR	Jan Choinski	121	2
FIN	Otto Virtanen	131	3
AUT	Sebastian Ofner	132	4
ITA	Giulio Zeppieri	153	5
NOR	Nicolai Budkov Kjær	154	6
~~EST~~	~~Mark Lajal~~	~~160~~	~~7~~
FRA	Ugo Blanchet	168	8

- ^{1} Rankings are as of 23 February 2026.

=== Other entrants ===
The following players received wildcards into the singles main draw:

- (France) Moïse Kouamé
- (France) Maé Malige
- (France) Tom Paris

The following players received entry into the singles main draw as alternates:

- (France) Dan Added
- (Belgium) Gilles-Arnaud Bailly
- (Switzerland) Rémy Bertola
- (United Kingdom) George Loffhagen
- (France) Clément Tabur

The following players received entry from the qualifying draw:

- (United Kingdom) Charles Broom
- (United States) Murphy Cassone
- (Czech Republic) Martin Krumich
- (Japan) Kei Nishikori
- (United States) Keegan Smith
- (Japan) Yosuke Watanuki

The following player received entry as a lucky loser:

- (Netherlands) Jelle Sels

== Champions ==
=== Singles ===
- (Austria) Sebastian Ofner def. (Norway) Nicolai Budkov Kjær 6–7^{(5–7)}, 6–3, 7–6^{(9–7)}.

=== Doubles ===
- Ivan Liutarevich / (Poland) Filip Pieczonka def. (United Kingdom) Joshua Paris / (France) Luca Sanchez 7–6^{(13–11)}, 7–6^{(7–5)}.
