= 2023 Vitas Gerulaitis Cup – Doubles =

Doubles
- 2023 Vitas Gerulaitis Cup

Final
- Champions: Ivan Liutarevich (Ukraine) Vladyslav Manafov
- Runners-up: (India) Arjun Kadhe (Germany) Daniel Masur
- Score: 6–0, 6–2

Events
Singles	Doubles
- Vitas Gerulaitis Cup

This was the first edition of the tournament.

Ivan Liutarevich and Vladyslav Manafov won the title after defeating Arjun Kadhe and Daniel Masur 6–0, 6–2 in the final.

== Seeds ==
1. (France) Jonathan Eysseric / (Ukraine) Denys Molchanov (quarterfinals)
2. (Monaco) Romain Arneodo / (Austria) Sam Weissborn (semifinals)
3. (Romania) Victor Vlad Cornea / (Greece) Petros Tsitsipas (first round)
4. (Poland) Karol Drzewiecki / (Poland) Szymon Walków (quarterfinals)

== Draw ==
Key

- Q = Qualifier
- WC = Wild card
- LL = Lucky loser
- Alt = Alternate
- ITF = ITF entry
- PR = Protected ranking
- SR = Special ranking
- SE = Special exempt
- JE = Junior exempt
- JR = Junior Accelerator Programme entrant
- CO = College Accelerator Programme entrant
- NG = Next Gen Accelerator Program entrant
- w/o = Walkover
- r = Retired
- d = Defaulted

First round
1	(France) J Eysseric (Ukraine) D Molchanov	6	6
(Czech Republic) V Kopřiva (Czech Republic) J Pospíšil	3	4
PR	(France) A Escoffier (Italy) J Ocleppo	3	6	[7]
WC	(Lithuania) E Butvilas (Italy) G Ferrari	6	4	[10]
3	(Romania) VV Cornea (Greece) Pe Tsitsipas	6^{4}	4
I Liutarevich (Ukraine) V Manafov	7^{7}	6
Alt	(Ukraine) V Sachko (Kazakhstan) D Yevseyev	2	6	[8]
(Switzerland) A Ritschard (Switzerland) D Stricker	6	4	[10]
(India) A Kadhe (Germany) D Masur	6	6
(Greece) M Kalovelonis (Germany) K Wehnelt	2	2
(United Kingdom) L Broady (United Kingdom) C Broom	6^{5}	3
4	(Poland) K Drzewiecki (Poland) S Walków	7^{7}	6
(India) P Raja (India) D Sharan	6	3	[10]
WC	(Lithuania) T Babelis (Lithuania) V Gaubas	4	6	[4]
(Czech Republic) Z Kolář (New Zealand) A Sitak	0	3
2	(Monaco) R Arneodo (Austria) S Weissborn	6	6

Quarterfinals
1	(France) J Eysseric (Ukraine) D Molchanov	6	5	[9]
WC	(Lithuania) E Butvilas (Italy) G Ferrari	3	7	[11]
I Liutarevich (Ukraine) V Manafov	w/o
(Switzerland) A Ritschard (Switzerland) D Stricker
(India) A Kadhe (Germany) D Masur	6	7^{7}
4	(Poland) K Drzewiecki (Poland) S Walków	3	6^{5}
(India) P Raja (India) D Sharan	2	6^{2}
2	(Monaco) R Arneodo (Austria) S Weissborn	6	7^{7}

Semifinals
WC	(Lithuania) E Butvilas (Italy) G Ferrari	1	4
I Liutarevich (Ukraine) V Manafov	6	6
(India) A Kadhe (Germany) D Masur	6	6
2	(Monaco) R Arneodo (Austria) S Weissborn	3	2

Final
I Liutarevich (Ukraine) V Manafov	6	6
(India) A Kadhe (Germany) D Masur	0	2
