= 2022 Challenger Rio de Janeiro – Doubles =

Doubles
- 2022 Challenger Rio de Janeiro

Final
- Champions: (Argentina) Guido Andreozzi (Argentina) Guillermo Durán
- Runners-up: (Poland) Karol Drzewiecki (Switzerland) Jakub Paul
- Score: 6–3, 6–2

Events
Singles	Doubles
Challenger Rio de Janeiro	· 2023 →

This was the first edition of the tournament.

Guido Andreozzi and Guillermo Durán won the title after defeating Karol Drzewiecki and Jakub Paul 6–3, 6–2 in the final.

== Seeds ==
1. (Argentina) Guido Andreozzi / (Argentina) Guillermo Durán (champions)
2. (Poland) Karol Drzewiecki / (Switzerland) Jakub Paul (final)
3. (Poland) Piotr Matuszewski / (Peru) Alexander Merino (first round)
4. (Argentina) Genaro Alberto Olivieri / (Argentina) Santiago Rodríguez Taverna (quarterfinals)

== Draw ==
=== Key ===
- Q = Qualifier
- WC = Wild card
- LL = Lucky loser
- Alt = Alternate
- SE = Special exempt
- PR = Protected ranking
- ITF = ITF entry
- JE = Junior exempt
- w/o = Walkover
- r = Retired
- d = Defaulted
- SR = Special ranking

First round
1	(Argentina) G Andreozzi (Argentina) G Durán	7	6
(Argentina) TA Tirante (Argentina) JB Torres	5	0
(Argentina) F Comesaña (Argentina) JP Paz	3	5
WC	(Brazil) M Alves (Brazil) E Ribeiro	6	7
4	(Argentina) GA Olivieri (Argentina) S Rodríguez Taverna	2	6	[10]
(Kazakhstan) D Popko (Spain) D Rincón	6	3	[6]
PR	(United Kingdom) J Choinski (India) S Nagal	4	3
(Brazil) JL Reis da Silva (Brazil) M Zormann	6	6
(Argentina) M Navone (Argentina) G Villanueva	6	6
(Brazil) Wilson Leite (Brazil) J Pereira	2	3
WC	(Brazil) Gustavo Almeida (Brazil) J Fonseca	4	6	[11]
3	(Poland) P Matuszewski (Peru) A Merino	6	4	[9]
(Brazil) D Dutra da Silva (Brazil) Gabriel Roveri Sidney	6	6
(Argentina) A Collarini (Argentina) Matías Zukas	3	0
Alt	(Switzerland) R Bertola (Switzerland) Mirko Martinez	6	3	[6]
2	(Poland) K Drzewiecki (Switzerland) J Paul	4	6	[10]

Quarterfinals
1	(Argentina) G Andreozzi (Argentina) G Durán	7^{7}	6
WC	(Brazil) M Alves (Brazil) E Ribeiro	6^{4}	0
4	(Argentina) GA Olivieri (Argentina) S Rodríguez Taverna	6^{6}	2
(Brazil) JL Reis da Silva (Brazil) M Zormann	7^{8}	6
(Argentina) M Navone (Argentina) G Villanueva	6	6
WC	(Brazil) G Almeida (Brazil) J Fonseca	0	2
(Brazil) D Dutra da Silva (Brazil) G Roveri Sidney
2	(Poland) K Drzewiecki (Switzerland) J Paul	w/o

Semifinals
1	(Argentina) G Andreozzi (Argentina) G Durán	6	6
(Brazil) JL Reis da Silva (Brazil) M Zormann	1	3
(Argentina) M Navone (Argentina) G Villanueva
2	(Poland) K Drzewiecki (Switzerland) J Paul	w/o

Final
1	(Argentina) G Andreozzi (Argentina) G Durán	6	6
2	(Poland) K Drzewiecki (Switzerland) J Paul	3	2
