= 2023 Challenger La Manche – Doubles =

Doubles
- 2023 Challenger La Manche

Final
- Champions: Ivan Liutarevich (Ukraine) Vladyslav Manafov
- Runners-up: (Poland) Karol Drzewiecki (Poland) Kacper Żuk
- Score: 7–6^{(12–10)}, 7–6^{(9–7)}

Events
Singles	Doubles
← 2022 ·	Challenger La Manche	· 2024 →

Jonathan Eysseric and Quentin Halys were the defending champions but chose not to defend their title.

Ivan Liutarevich and Vladyslav Manafov won the title after defeating Karol Drzewiecki and Kacper Żuk 7–6^{(12–10)}, 7–6^{(9–7)} in the final.

== Seeds ==
1. (Jamaica) Dustin Brown / (Australia) Andrew Harris (quarterfinals)
2. (France) Dan Added / (Austria) Neil Oberleitner (first round)
3. (France) Théo Arribagé / (Germany) Constantin Frantzen (first round)
4. (Germany) Hendrik Jebens / (Germany) Niklas Schell (semifinals)

== Draw ==
=== Key ===
- Q = Qualifier
- WC = Wild card
- LL = Lucky loser
- Alt = Alternate
- SE = Special exempt
- PR = Protected ranking
- ITF = ITF entry
- JE = Junior exempt
- w/o = Walkover
- r = Retired
- d = Defaulted
- SR = Special ranking

First round
1	(Jamaica) D Brown (Australia) A Harris	6	3	[10]
(Sweden) F Bergevi (Poland) P Matuszewski	2	6	[4]
(Poland) K Drzewiecki (Poland) K Żuk	7^{7}	6
(Croatia) Z Babić (Croatia) M Poljičak	6^{4}	3
3	(France) T Arribagé (Germany) C Frantzen	4	6	[6]
(France) H Grenier; A Vatutin	6	3	[10]
(France) A Hoang (France) L Sanchez	1	6	[10]
WC	(France) K de Schepper (France) M Martineau	6	2	[6]
E Donskoy (Tunisia) M Jaziri	1	6^{6}
(France) G Blancaneaux (Belgium) M Geerts	6	7^{8}
(Latvia) M Lībietis (Switzerland) L Margaroli	4	6^{5}
4	(Germany) H Jebens (Germany) Niklas Schell	6	7^{7}
(Uzbekistan) S Fayziev (Greece) M Kalovelonis	6^{5}	4
WC	(France) C Chidekh (United Kingdom) J Paris	7^{7}	6
I Liutarevich (Ukraine) V Manafov	6	3	[12]
2	(France) D Added (Austria) N Oberleitner	3	6	[10]

Quarterfinals
1	(Jamaica) D Brown (Australia) A Harris	6	6^{4}	[9]
(Poland) K Drzewiecki (Poland) K Żuk	4	7^{7}	[11]
(France) H Grenier; A Vatutin	3	2
(France) A Hoang (France) L Sanchez	6	6
(France) G Blancaneaux (Belgium) M Geerts	6	4	[6]
4	(Germany) H Jebens (Germany) N Schell	3	6	[10]
WC	(France) C Chidekh (United Kingdom) J Paris	3	7^{7}	[2]
I Liutarevich (Ukraine) V Manafov	6	6^{5}	[10]

Semifinals
(Poland) K Drzewiecki (Poland) K Żuk	7^{7}	6
(France) A Hoang (France) L Sanchez	6^{5}	3
4	(Germany) H Jebens (Germany) N Schell	3	6	[5]
I Liutarevich (Ukraine) V Manafov	6	3	[10]

Final
(Poland) K Drzewiecki (Poland) K Żuk	6^{10}	6^{7}
I Liutarevich (Ukraine) V Manafov	7^{12}	7^{9}
