= 2024 UniCredit Czech Open =

- Date: 3 – 8 June
- Edition: 31st
- Surface: Clay
- Location: Prostějov, Czech Republic
- Venue: TK Agrofert Prostějov

Champions

Singles
- (Switzerland) Jérôme Kym

Doubles
- Ivan Liutarevich / (Spain) Sergio Martos Gornés
- Czech Open

The 2024 UniCredit Czech Open was a professional tennis tournament played on clay courts. It was the 31st edition of the tournament which was part of the 2024 ATP Challenger Tour. It took place in Prostějov, Czech Republic between 3 and 8 June 2024.

== Singles main-draw entrants ==
=== Seeds ===
Country	Player	Rank^{1}	Seed
SRB	Laslo Djere	52	1
JPN	Yoshihito Nishioka	70	2
ARG	Pedro Cachín	108	3
CZE	Vít Kopřiva	127	4
ITA	Francesco Passaro	134	5
MDA	Radu Albot	140	6
FRA	Ugo Blanchet	160	7
CZE	Dalibor Svrčina	192	8

- ^{1} Rankings are as of 27 May 2024.

=== Other entrants ===
The following players received wildcards into the singles main draw:

- (Serbia) Laslo Djere
- (Slovakia) Martin Kližan
- (Czech Republic) Andrew Paulson

The following players received entry into the singles main draw as alternates:

- Alibek Kachmazov
- (Belgium) Gauthier Onclin
- (Czech Republic) Jiří Veselý

The following players received entry from the qualifying draw:

- (France) Arthur Géa
- (United States) Toby Kodat
- (Switzerland) Jérôme Kym
- (Egypt) Mohamed Safwat
- (Chile) Matías Soto
- (Czech Republic) Michael Vrbenský

The following player received entry as a lucky loser:

- (Czech Republic) Martin Krumich

== Champions ==
=== Singles ===
- (Switzerland) Jérôme Kym def. (Chinese Taipei) Tseng Chun-hsin 6–2, 3–6, 6–2.

=== Doubles ===
- Ivan Liutarevich / (Spain) Sergio Martos Gornés def. (Netherlands) Matwé Middelkoop / (Austria) Philipp Oswald 6–1, 6–4.
