= 2025 Challenger Città di Lugano – Doubles =

Doubles
- 2025 Challenger Città di Lugano

Final
- Champions: (Canada) Cleeve Harper (United Kingdom) David Stevenson
- Runners-up: (Switzerland) Jakub Paul (Netherlands) David Pel
- Score: 4–6, 6–3, [10–8]

Events
Singles	Doubles
← 2024 ·	Challenger Città di Lugano	· 2026 →

Sander Arends and Sem Verbeek were the defending champions but chose not to defend their title.

Cleeve Harper and David Stevenson won the title after defeating Jakub Paul and David Pel 4–6, 6–3, [10–8] in the final.

== Seeds ==
1. (Switzerland) Jakub Paul / (Netherlands) David Pel (final)
2. (Ukraine) Denys Molchanov / (Netherlands) Mick Veldheer (first round)
3. (Italy) Marco Bortolotti / (Spain) Sergio Martos Gornés (quarterfinals)
4. (Canada) Cleeve Harper / (United Kingdom) David Stevenson (champions)

== Draw ==
Key

- Q = Qualifier
- WC = Wild card
- LL = Lucky loser
- Alt = Alternate
- ITF = ITF entry
- PR = Protected ranking
- SR = Special ranking
- SE = Special exempt
- JE = Junior exempt
- JR = Junior Accelerator Programme entrant
- CO = College Accelerator Programme entrant
- NG = Next Gen Accelerator Program entrant
- w/o = Walkover
- r = Retired
- d = Defaulted

=== Draw ===
First round
1	(Switzerland) J Paul (Netherlands) D Pel	4	6	[10]
Alt	(Italy) F Romano (Italy) Augusto Virgili	6	4	[6]
(Ukraine) V Sachko (Kazakhstan) B Zhukayev	6	6
(United States) V Kirkov (United Kingdom) M Willis	2	4
3	(Italy) M Bortolotti (Spain) S Martos Gornés	3	6	[10]
WC	(Switzerland) R Bertola (Switzerland) L Margaroli	6	4	[1]
(United States) M Kiger (New Zealand) F Reynolds	4	6^{4}
WC	(Switzerland) Andrin Casanova (Switzerland) Nicolás Parizzia	6	7^{7}
Alt	(China) J Cui (Chinese Taipei) T-l Wu	2	4
(United States) M Cassone (Canada) L Draxl	6	6
(Finland) P Niklas-Salminen (Finland) E Ruusuvuori	5	3
4	(Canada) C Harper (United Kingdom) D Stevenson	7	6
(Japan) K Uesugi (Spain) D Vega Hernández	6	6
(France) C Chidekh (France) L Sanchez	3	2
(Serbia) I Sabanov (Serbia) M Sabanov	7^{7}	7^{7}
2	(Ukraine) D Molchanov (Netherlands) M Veldheer	6^{3}	6^{3}

Quarterfinals
1	(Switzerland) J Paul (Netherlands) D Pel	7^{7}	7
(Ukraine) V Sachko (Kazakhstan) B Zhukayev	6^{3}	5
3	(Italy) M Bortolotti (Spain) S Martos Gornés	6	2	[8]
WC	(Switzerland) A Casanova (Switzerland) N Parizzia	4	6	[10]
(United States) M Cassone (Canada) L Draxl
4	(Canada) C Harper (United Kingdom) D Stevenson	w/o
(Japan) K Uesugi (Spain) D Vega Hernández	6	6
(Serbia) I Sabanov (Serbia) M Sabanov	0	4

Semifinals
1	(Switzerland) J Paul (Netherlands) D Pel	7^{7}	6
WC	(Switzerland) A Casanova (Switzerland) N Parizzia	6^{3}	4
4	(Canada) C Harper (United Kingdom) D Stevenson	6	6^{5}	[10]
(Japan) K Uesugi (Spain) D Vega Hernández	3	7^{7}	[7]

Final
1	(Switzerland) J Paul (Netherlands) D Pel	6	3	[8]
4	(Canada) C Harper (United Kingdom) D Stevenson	4	6	[10]
