= 2026 Thionville Open – Singles =

Singles
- 2026 Thionville Open

Final
- Champion: (Austria) Sebastian Ofner
- Runner-up: (Norway) Nicolai Budkov Kjær
- Score: 6–7^{(5–7)}, 6–3, 7–6^{(9–7)}

Events
Singles	Doubles
- Thionville Open

Borna Ćorić was the defending champion but chose not to defend his title.

Sebastian Ofner won the title after defeating Nicolai Budkov Kjær 6–7^{(5–7)}, 6–3, 7–6^{(9–7)} in the final.

== Seeds ==
1. (France) Hugo Gaston (semifinals)
2. (United Kingdom) Jan Choinski (quarterfinals)
3. (Finland) Otto Virtanen (semifinals)
4. (Austria) Sebastian Ofner (champion)
5. (Italy) Giulio Zeppieri (second round, retired)
6. (Norway) Nicolai Budkov Kjær (final)
7. (Estonia) Mark Lajal (withdrew)
8. (France) Ugo Blanchet (quarterfinals)

== Draw ==
Key

- Q = Qualifier
- WC = Wild card
- LL = Lucky loser
- Alt = Alternate
- ITF = ITF entry
- PR = Protected ranking
- SR = Special ranking
- SE = Special exempt
- JE = Junior exempt
- JR = Junior Accelerator Programme entrant
- CO = College Accelerator Programme entrant
- NG = Next Gen Accelerator Program entrant
- w/o = Walkover
- r = Retired
- d = Defaulted

=== Finals ===
Semifinals
1	(France) Hugo Gaston	4	2
4	(Austria) Sebastian Ofner	6	6
3	(Finland) Otto Virtanen	6	2	6^{3}
6	(Norway) Nicolai Budkov Kjær	4	6	7^{7}

Final
4	(Austria) Sebastian Ofner	6^{5}	6	7^{9}
6	(Norway) Nicolai Budkov Kjær	7^{7}	3	6^{7}

=== Top half ===
First round
1	(France) H Gaston	6	4
(Estonia) D Glinka	3	2^{r}
(Denmark) A Holmgren	3	6	3
Q	(United States) K Smith	6	3	6
LL	(Netherlands) J Sels	3	0
WC	(France) M Kouamé	6	6
(Germany) J Engel	6	5	1
5	(Italy) G Zeppieri	4	7	6
4	(Austria) S Ofner	4	7	7^{7}
Alt	(United Kingdom) G Loffhagen	6	5	6^{5}
Q	(United States) M Cassone	6	6
Q	(United Kingdom) C Broom	4	3
(Austria) J Rodionov	6	1
(France) H Grenier	3	0^{r}
Alt	(France) D Added	4	2
Q	(Czech Republic) M Krumich	6	6

Second round
1	(France) H Gaston	3	6	6
Q	(United States) K Smith	6	3	2
WC	(France) M Kouamé	6	1
5	(Italy) G Zeppieri	1	0^{r}
4	(Austria) S Ofner	7	6
Q	(United States) M Cassone	5	2
(Austria) J Rodionov	6	6
Q	(Czech Republic) M Krumich	3	2

Quarterfinals
1	(France) H Gaston	3	6	6
WC	(France) M Kouamé	6	3	4
4	(Austria) S Ofner	6	3	6
(Austria) J Rodionov	2	6	3

Semifinals
1	(France) H Gaston	4	2
4	(Austria) S Ofner	6	6

=== Bottom half ===
First round
8	(France) U Blanchet	6^{5}	6	3
Q	(Japan) Y Watanuki	7^{7}	2	0^{r}
Alt	(Switzerland) R Bertola	3	6^{3}
(France) C Chidekh	6	7^{7}
(France) P-H Herbert	6	6^{3}	6
Alt	(Belgium) GA Bailly	3	7^{7}	3
WC	(France) T Paris	4	6	6^{2}
3	(Finland) O Virtanen	6	1	7^{7}
6	(Norway) N Budkov Kjær	6	6
(Slovakia) A Molčan	1	2
Alt	(France) C Tabur	5	6	2
Q	(Japan) K Nishikori	7	4	6
R Safiullin	7^{7}	6
(Kazakhstan) T Skatov	6^{3}	3
WC	(France) Maé Malige	6^{3}	1
2	(United Kingdom) J Choinski	7^{7}	6

Second round
8	(France) U Blanchet	6	6
(France) C Chidekh	2	2
(France) P-H Herbert	5	4
3	(Finland) O Virtanen	7	6
6	(Norway) N Budkov Kjær	3	6	6
Q	(Japan) K Nishikori	6	4	2
R Safiullin	6	5	5
2	(United Kingdom) J Choinski	4	7	7

Quarterfinals
8	(France) U Blanchet	5	6^{3}
3	(Finland) O Virtanen	7	7^{7}
6	(Norway) N Budkov Kjær	6	7^{7}
2	(United Kingdom) J Choinski	4	6^{5}

Semifinals
3	(Finland) O Virtanen	6	2	6^{3}
6	(Norway) N Budkov Kjær	4	6	7^{7}
