= 2022 Challenger La Manche =

- Date: 7–13 February
- Edition: 29th
- Surface: Hard (indoor)
- Location: Cherbourg, France

Champions

Singles
- (France) Benjamin Bonzi

Doubles
- (France) Jonathan Eysseric / (France) Quentin Halys
| ← 2021 · | Challenger La Manche | · 2023 → |

The 2022 Challenger La Manche was a professional tennis tournament played on indoor hard courts. It was the 29th edition of the tournament which was part of the 2022 ATP Challenger Tour. It took place in Cherbourg, France between 7 and 13 February 2022.

== Singles main-draw entrants ==
=== Seeds ===
| Country | Player | Rank^{1} | Seed |
|---|---|---|---|
| FRA | Benjamin Bonzi | 68 | 1 |
| FRA | Pierre-Hugues Herbert | 113 | 2 |
| CZE | Tomáš Macháč | 116 | 3 |
| AUT | Dennis Novak | 117 | 4 |
| FRA | Gilles Simon | 130 | 5 |
| FRA | Quentin Halys | 141 | 6 |
| RUS | Roman Safiullin | 148 | 7 |
| FRA | Lucas Pouille | 156 | 8 |

- ^{1} Rankings are as of 31 January 2022.

=== Other entrants ===
The following players received wildcards into the singles main draw:

- (France) Kenny de Schepper
- (France) Harold Mayot
- (France) Luca Van Assche

The following player received entry into the singles main draw as an alternate:

- (France) Constant Lestienne

The following players received entry from the qualifying draw:

- (France) Dan Added
- (Czech Republic) Jonáš Forejtek
- (France) Tristan Lamasine
- (France) Jules Marie
- (Germany) Maximilian Marterer
- (Germany) Mats Rosenkranz

== Champions ==
=== Singles ===
- (France) Benjamin Bonzi def. (France) Constant Lestienne 6–4, 2–6, 6–4.

=== Doubles ===
- (France) Jonathan Eysseric / (France) Quentin Halys def. (Germany) Hendrik Jebens / (Germany) Niklas Schell 7–6^{(8–6)}, 6–2.
