= 2022 Challenger Rio de Janeiro =

- Date: 10 – 16 October
- Edition: 1st
- Surface: Clay
- Location: Rio de Janeiro, Brazil

Champions

Singles
- (Italy) Marco Cecchinato

Doubles
- (Argentina) Guido Andreozzi / (Argentina) Guillermo Durán
Challenger Rio de Janeiro	· 2023 →

The 2022 Challenger Rio de Janeiro was a professional tennis tournament played on clay courts. It was the first edition of the tournament which was part of the 2022 ATP Challenger Tour. It took place in Rio de Janeiro, Brazil between 10 and 16 October 2022.

== Singles main draw entrants ==
=== Seeds ===
Country	Player	Rank^{1}	Seed
ARG	Federico Coria	72	1
PER	Juan Pablo Varillas	107	2
ITA	Marco Cecchinato	114	3
ARG	Camilo Ugo Carabelli	119	4
BRA	Felipe Meligeni Alves	143	5
FRA	Alexandre Müller	145	6
ARG	Juan Manuel Cerúndolo	148	7
GER	Yannick Hanfmann	163	8

- ^{1} Rankings are as of 3 October 2022.

=== Other entrants ===
The following players received wildcards into the singles main draw:

- (Brazil) Gustavo Almeida
- (Brazil) João Fonseca
- (Brazil) João Lucas Reis da Silva

The following player received entry into the singles main draw as a special exempt:

- (United Kingdom) Jan Choinski

The following players received entry into the singles main draw as alternates:

- (Argentina) Genaro Alberto Olivieri
- (Argentina) Juan Bautista Torres
- (Argentina) Gonzalo Villanueva

The following players received entry from the qualifying draw:

- (Switzerland) Rémy Bertola
- (France) Giovanni Mpetshi Perricard
- (India) Sumit Nagal
- (Argentina) Mariano Navone
- (Switzerland) Jakub Paul
- (Argentina) Juan Pablo Paz

== Champions ==
=== Singles ===
- (Italy) Marco Cecchinato def. (Germany) Yannick Hanfmann 4–6, 6–4, 6–3.

=== Doubles ===
- (Argentina) Guido Andreozzi / (Argentina) Guillermo Durán def. (Poland) Karol Drzewiecki / (Switzerland) Jakub Paul 6–3, 6–2.
