= 2025 Szczecin Open =

- Date: 8–14 September
- Edition: 32nd
- Surface: Clay
- Location: Szczecin, Poland

Champions

Singles
- (Argentina) Thiago Agustín Tirante

Doubles
- (Ukraine) Denys Molchanov / (Austria) David Pichler
- Szczecin Open

The 2025 Invest in Szczecin Open was a professional tennis tournament played on clay courts. It was the 32nd edition of the tournament which was part of the 2025 ATP Challenger Tour. It took place in Szczecin, Poland between 8 and 14 September 2025.

== Singles main-draw entrants ==
=== Seeds ===
Country	Player	Rank^{1}	Seed
CZE	Vít Kopřiva	89	1
ARG	Thiago Agustín Tirante	115	2
ITA	Francesco Passaro	120	3
COL	Daniel Elahi Galán	131	4
ITA	Andrea Pellegrino	141	5
ARG	Román Andrés Burruchaga	142	6
GBR	Jan Choinski	150	7
BRA	Thiago Monteiro	169	8

^{1} Rankings are as of 25 August 2025.

=== Other entrants ===
The following players received wildcards into the singles main draw:

- (Poland) Dorian Juszczak
- (Poland) Mateusz Lange
- (Poland) Alan Ważny

The following player received entry into the singles main draw using a protected ranking:

- (Spain) Pablo Llamas Ruiz

The following player received entry into the singles main draw as a special exempt:

- (Czech Republic) Andrew Paulson

The following player received entry into the singles main draw through the Next Gen Accelerator programme:

- (Germany) Diego Dedura

The following players received entry into the singles main draw as alternates:

- (Czech Republic) Hynek Bartoň
- (Spain) Nikolás Sánchez Izquierdo

The following players received entry from the qualifying draw:

- (Italy) Lorenzo Bocchi
- (Slovakia) Jozef Kovalík
- (Germany) Rudolf Molleker
- (Germany) Henri Squire
- Alexey Vatutin
- (Czech Republic) Michael Vrbenský

== Champions ==
=== Singles ===
- (Argentina) Thiago Agustín Tirante def. (Spain) Pablo Llamas Ruiz 6–3, 6–2.

=== Doubles ===
- (Ukraine) Denys Molchanov / (Austria) David Pichler def. Ivan Liutarevich / (Spain) Bruno Pujol Navarro 3–6, 7–6^{(7–1)}, [10–6].
