= 2024 UniCredit Czech Open – Doubles =

Doubles
- 2024 UniCredit Czech Open

Final
- Champions: Ivan Liutarevich (Spain) Sergio Martos Gornés
- Runners-up: (Netherlands) Matwé Middelkoop (Austria) Philipp Oswald
- Score: 6–1, 6–4

Events
Singles	Doubles
- Czech Open

Ariel Behar and Adam Pavlásek were the defending champions but chose not to defend their title.

Ivan Liutarevich and Sergio Martos Gornés won the title after defeating Matwé Middelkoop and Philipp Oswald 6–1, 6–4 in the final.

== Seeds ==
1. (Netherlands) Matwé Middelkoop / (Austria) Philipp Oswald (final)
2. (India) Jeevan Nedunchezhiyan / (India) Vijay Sundar Prashanth (first round)
3. (Italy) Marco Bortolotti / (Australia) Matthew Romios (first round)
4. (Ukraine) Vladyslav Manafov / (France) Luca Sanchez (first round)

== Draw ==
Key

- Q = Qualifier
- WC = Wild card
- LL = Lucky loser
- Alt = Alternate
- ITF = ITF entry
- PR = Protected ranking
- SR = Special ranking
- SE = Special exempt
- JE = Junior exempt
- JR = Junior Accelerator Programme entrant
- CO = College Accelerator Programme entrant
- NG = Next Gen Accelerator Program entrant
- w/o = Walkover
- r = Retired
- d = Defaulted

=== Draw ===
First round
1	(Netherlands) M Middelkoop (Austria) P Oswald	6	2	[10]
WC	(Czech Republic) Adam Jurajda (Slovakia) I Zelenay	1	6	[3]
WC	(Czech Republic) D Reček (Czech Republic) D Siniakov	6	2	[8]
(Poland) K Drzewiecki (Poland) P Matuszewski	3	6	[10]
3	(Italy) M Bortolotti (Australia) MC Romios	3	1
(Brazil) F Romboli (Chile) M Soto	6	6
(Brazil) M Demoliner (Argentina) G Durán	6^{6}	6^{2}
(Czech Republic) V Kopřiva (Ukraine) V Sachko	7^{8}	7^{7}
(South Korea) J-s Nam (Finland) P Niklas-Salminen	6	6
(Czech Republic) R Jebavý (Czech Republic) D Svrčina	2	2
(Czech Republic) P Nouza (Czech Republic) M Vrbenský	6	6
4	(Ukraine) V Manafov (France) L Sanchez	2	2
I Liutarevich (Spain) S Martos Gornés	7^{7}	5	[10]
(Netherlands) D Pel (Spain) D Vega Hernández	6^{5}	7	[8]
(Czech Republic) A Paulson (Czech Republic) P Rikl	7^{7}	6
2	(India) J Nedunchezhiyan (India) VS Prashanth	6^{4}	4

Quarterfinals
1	(Netherlands) M Middelkoop (Austria) P Oswald	7	7
(Poland) K Drzewiecki (Poland) P Matuszewski	5	5
(Brazil) F Romboli (Chile) M Soto	6	6
(Czech Republic) V Kopřiva (Ukraine) V Sachko	4	4
(South Korea) J-s Nam (Finland) P Niklas-Salminen	6	6
(Czech Republic) P Nouza (Czech Republic) M Vrbenský	3	3
I Liutarevich (Spain) S Martos Gornés	w/o
(Czech Republic) A Paulson (Czech Republic) P Rikl

Semifinals
1	(Netherlands) M Middelkoop (Austria) P Oswald	6	6^{5}	[10]
(Brazil) F Romboli (Chile) M Soto	1	7^{7}	[7]
(South Korea) J-s Nam (Finland) P Niklas-Salminen	5	6^{7}
I Liutarevich (Spain) S Martos Gornés	7	7^{9}

Final
1	(Netherlands) M Middelkoop (Austria) P Oswald	1	4
I Liutarevich (Spain) S Martos Gornés	6	6
