= 2022 Challenger La Manche – Singles =

Singles
- 2022 Challenger La Manche

Final
- Champion: (France) Benjamin Bonzi
- Runner-up: (France) Constant Lestienne
- Score: 6–4, 2–6, 6–4

Events
Singles	Doubles
← 2021 ·	Challenger La Manche	· 2023 →

Ruben Bemelmans was the defending champion but lost in the quarterfinals to Zizou Bergs.

Benjamin Bonzi won the title after defeating Constant Lestienne 6–4, 2–6, 6–4 in the final.

== Seeds ==
1. (France) Benjamin Bonzi (champion)
2. (France) Pierre-Hugues Herbert (quarterfinals)
3. (Czech Republic) Tomáš Macháč (first round)
4. (Austria) Dennis Novak (second round)
5. (France) Gilles Simon (second round)
6. (France) Quentin Halys (second round)
7. (Russia) Roman Safiullin (first round)
8. (France) Lucas Pouille (first round, retired)

== Draw ==
=== Key ===
- Q = Qualifier
- WC = Wild card
- LL = Lucky loser
- Alt = Alternate
- SE = Special exempt
- PR = Protected ranking
- ITF = ITF entry
- JE = Junior exempt
- w/o = Walkover
- r = Retired
- d = Defaulted
- SR = Special ranking

=== Finals ===
Semifinals
1	(France) Benjamin Bonzi	4	7	6
(Belgium) Zizou Bergs	6	5	1
Alt	(France) Constant Lestienne	6^{4}	6	6
(Latvia) Ernests Gulbis	7^{7}	4	4

Final
1	(France) Benjamin Bonzi	6	2	6
Alt	(France) Constant Lestienne	4	6	4

=== Top half ===
First round
1	(France) B Bonzi	6	6
Q	(Germany) M Rosenkranz	3	2
Q	(France) Jules Marie	6	0^{r}
WC	(France) K de Schepper	4	4
(France) G Barrère	4	6	3
(United Kingdom) J Draper	6	1	6
Q	(Germany) M Marterer	6	3	7
7	(Russia) R Safiullin	3	6	5
4	(Austria) D Novak	6	6
(Portugal) G Elias	2	1
(Italy) A Pellegrino	6^{4}	4
(Belgium) Z Bergs	7^{7}	6
(Belgium) R Bemelmans	6	6
(France) M Janvier	2	4
WC	(France) H Mayot	4	6^{2}
6	(France) Q Halys	6	7^{7}

Second round
1	(France) B Bonzi	6	7^{7}
WC	(France) K de Schepper	3	6^{4}
(United Kingdom) J Draper	6	6
Q	(Germany) M Marterer	4	2
4	(Austria) D Novak	5	2
(Belgium) Z Bergs	7	6
(Belgium) R Bemelmans	7^{7}	5	6
6	(France) Q Halys	6^{3}	7	3

Quarterfinals
1	(France) B Bonzi	7^{8}	6
(United Kingdom) J Draper	6^{6}	2
(Belgium) Z Bergs	6	6
(Belgium) R Bemelmans	3	3

Semifinals
1	(France) B Bonzi	4	7	6
(Belgium) Z Bergs	6	5	1

=== Bottom half ===
First round
8	(France) L Pouille	4	0^{r}
Q	(France) T Lamasine	6	0
(France) A Hoang	5	6^{3}
WC	(France) L Van Assche	7	7^{7}
Alt	(France) C Lestienne	1	7^{7}	6
(Egypt) M Safwat	6	6^{3}	1
(Kazakhstan) M Kukushkin	6	6
3	(Czech Republic) T Macháč	3	2
5	(France) G Simon	4	7^{7}	6
(Switzerland) M-A Hüsler	6	6^{5}	4
Q	(France) D Added	4	4
(Latvia) E Gulbis	6	6
Q	(Czech Republic) J Forejtek	4	6	6
(Slovakia) F Horanský	6	1	4
(Poland) K Żuk	2	6^{4}
2	(France) P-H Herbert	6	7^{7}

Second round
Q	(France) T Lamasine	6	6^{4}	1^{r}
WC	(France) L Van Assche	3	7^{7}	4
Alt	(France) C Lestienne	7	6
(Kazakhstan) M Kukushkin	5	3
5	(France) G Simon	3	6	3
(Latvia) E Gulbis	6	2	6
Q	(Czech Republic) J Forejtek	3	4
2	(France) P-H Herbert	6	6

Quarterfinals
WC	(France) L Van Assche	3	7^{7}	1
Alt	(France) C Lestienne	6	6^{2}	6
(Latvia) E Gulbis	7	2	6
2	(France) P-H Herbert	5	6	4

Semifinals
Alt	(France) C Lestienne	6^{4}	6	6
(Latvia) E Gulbis	7^{7}	4	4
