= 2023 Vitas Gerulaitis Cup – Singles =

Singles
- 2023 Vitas Gerulaitis Cup

Final
- Champion: (United Kingdom) Liam Broady
- Runner-up: (Czech Republic) Zdeněk Kolář
- Score: 6–4, 6–4

Events
Singles	Doubles
Vitas Gerulaitis Cup	· 2024 →

This was the first edition of the tournament.

Liam Broady won the title after defeating Zdeněk Kolář 6–4, 6–4 in the final.

== Seeds ==
1. (Switzerland) Dominic Stricker (first round)
2. (Sweden) Elias Ymer (second round)
3. (Austria) Jurij Rodionov (second round)
4. (Austria) Dennis Novak (quarterfinals, retired)
5. (Germany) Jan-Lennard Struff (first round)
6. (Netherlands) Gijs Brouwer (first round)
7. (Czech Republic) Vít Kopřiva (first round)
8. (France) Laurent Lokoli (second round)

== Draw ==
=== Key ===
- Q = Qualifier
- WC = Wild card
- LL = Lucky loser
- Alt = Alternate
- SE = Special exempt
- PR = Protected ranking
- ITF = ITF entry
- JE = Junior exempt
- w/o = Walkover
- r = Retired
- d = Defaulted
- SR = Special ranking

=== Finals ===
Semifinals
WC	(Turkey) Cem İlkel	2	3
(Czech Republic) Zdeněk Kolář	6	6
(Bosnia and Herzegovina) Damir Džumhur	1	3
(United Kingdom) Liam Broady	6	6

Final
(Czech Republic) Zdeněk Kolář	4	4
(United Kingdom) Liam Broady	6	6

=== Top half ===
First round
1	(Switzerland) D Stricker	3	1
(Belgium) J De Loore	6	6
Q	(Kazakhstan) D Yevseyev	6	6
Q	(Italy) J Ocleppo	2	2
Alt	(Croatia) N Serdarušić	2	4
WC	(Turkey) C İlkel	6	6
Alt	(Poland) K Żuk	6	2	5
8	(France) L Lokoli	0	6	7
3	(Austria) J Rodionov	6	6
Alt	(Belgium) M Geerts	2	3
(Czech Republic) Z Kolář	7^{7}	6
Q	(Germany) D Masur	6^{3}	4
(France) A Escoffier	1	7	7^{7}
WC	(Lithuania) E Butvilas	6	5	6^{5}
(Finland) O Virtanen	6	7^{7}
6	(Netherlands) G Brouwer	4	6^{1}

Second round
(Belgium) J De Loore	6	6
Q	(Kazakhstan) D Yevseyev	3	4
WC	(Turkey) C İlkel	6	6
8	(France) L Lokoli	3	2
3	(Austria) J Rodionov	4	6	1
(Czech Republic) Z Kolář	6	1	6
(France) A Escoffier	6	0
(Finland) O Virtanen	2	0^{r}

Quarterfinals
(Belgium) J De Loore	6	6^{5}	5
WC	(Turkey) C İlkel	4	7^{7}	7
(Czech Republic) Z Kolář	6	4	6
(France) A Escoffier	3	6	4

Semifinals
WC	(Turkey) C İlkel	2	3
(Czech Republic) Z Kolář	6	6

=== Bottom half ===
First round
5	(Germany) J-L Struff	3	4
Q	E Gerasimov	6	6
(Switzerland) H Laaksonen	2	0^{r}
(Bosnia and Herzegovina) D Džumhur	6	0
(Lithuania) R Berankis	2	6	6
(Turkey) A Çelikbilek	6	2	4
(Switzerland) A Ritschard	4	3
4	(Austria) D Novak	6	6
7	(Czech Republic) V Kopřiva	4	2
(France) E Furness	6	6
Q	(Turkey) E Kırkın	7	6^{4}	7^{7}
Q	(Germany) M Rosenkranz	5	7^{7}	6^{2}
(United Kingdom) L Broady	6	6
Alt	(Germany) M Moraing	3	1
WC	(Lithuania) V Gaubas	6	6^{5}	4
2	(Sweden) E Ymer	4	7^{7}	6

Second round
Q	E Gerasimov	1	3
(Bosnia and Herzegovina) D Džumhur	6	6
(Lithuania) R Berankis	6	3	2
4	(Austria) D Novak	1	6	6
(France) E Furness	3	7	6
Q	(Turkey) E Kırkın	6	5	0
(United Kingdom) L Broady	6	6
2	(Sweden) E Ymer	3	1

Quarterfinals
(Bosnia and Herzegovina) D Džumhur	2	4
4	(Austria) D Novak	6	4^{r}
(France) E Furness	0	0^{r}
(United Kingdom) L Broady	6	1

Semifinals
(Bosnia and Herzegovina) D Džumhur	1	3
(United Kingdom) L Broady	6	6
