= 2022 Challenger La Manche – Doubles =

Doubles
- 2022 Challenger La Manche

Final
- Champions: (France) Jonathan Eysseric (France) Quentin Halys
- Runners-up: (Germany) Hendrik Jebens (Germany) Niklas Schell
- Score: 7–6^{(8–6)}, 6–2

Events
Singles	Doubles
← 2021 ·	Challenger La Manche	· 2023 →

Lukáš Klein and Alex Molčan were the defending champions but chose not to defend their title.

Jonathan Eysseric and Quentin Halys won the title after defeating Hendrik Jebens and Niklas Schell 7–6^{(8–6)}, 6–2 in the final.

== Seeds ==
1. (France) Sadio Doumbia / (France) Fabien Reboul (quarterfinals)
2. (Ukraine) Denys Molchanov / (Croatia) Antonio Šančić (quarterfinals, retired)
3. (France) Manuel Guinard / (France) Albano Olivetti (quarterfinals)
4. (France) Benjamin Bonzi / (France) Antoine Hoang (quarterfinals)

== Draw ==
=== Key ===
- Q = Qualifier
- WC = Wild card
- LL = Lucky loser
- Alt = Alternate
- SE = Special exempt
- PR = Protected ranking
- ITF = ITF entry
- JE = Junior exempt
- w/o = Walkover
- r = Retired
- d = Defaulted
- SR = Special ranking

First round
(Spain) A Menéndez Maceiras (Egypt) M Safwat	6	1	[11]
(Belgium) R Bemelmans (Belgium) Z Bergs	4	6	[13]
4	(France) B Bonzi (France) A Hoang	6	6
(France) T Lamasine (France) H Mayot	3	3
(Portugal) F Cabral (Spain) S Martos Gornés	6^{5}	6	[2]
(France) J Eysseric (France) Q Halys	7^{7}	3	[10]
(Italy) M Bortolotti (Ukraine) V Sachko	6^{3}	5
(United Kingdom) J Draper (United States) A Ritschard	7^{7}	7
(France) D Added (Zimbabwe) B Lock	6^{4}	6	[5]
3	(France) M Guinard (France) A Olivetti	7^{7}	4	[10]
PR	(India) A Chandrasekar (India) VS Prashanth	6^{5}	6^{4}
(Germany) H Jebens (Germany) Niklas Schell	7^{7}	7^{7}

Quarterfinals
1	(France) S Doumbia (France) F Reboul	6	2	[6]
(Belgium) R Bemelmans (Belgium) Z Bergs	4	6	[10]
4	(France) B Bonzi (France) A Hoang	6^{1}	7^{7}	[10]
(France) J Eysseric (France) Q Halys	7^{7}	6^{5}	[12]
(United Kingdom) J Draper (United States) A Ritschard	6	6^{8}	[10]
3	(France) M Guinard (France) A Olivetti	3	7^{10}	[7]
(Germany) H Jebens (Germany) N Schell	6	0
2	(Ukraine) D Molchanov (Croatia) A Šančić	4	0^{r}

Semifinals
(Belgium) R Bemelmans (Belgium) Z Bergs	7^{7}	4	[4]
(France) J Eysseric (France) Q Halys	6^{5}	6	[10]
(United Kingdom) J Draper (United States) A Ritschard
(Germany) H Jebens (Germany) N Schell	w/o

Final
(France) J Eysseric (France) Q Halys	7^{8}	6
(Germany) H Jebens (Germany) N Schell	6^{6}	2
