= 2023 Challenger La Manche =

- Date: 13–19 February
- Edition: 30th
- Surface: Hard (indoor)
- Location: Cherbourg, France

Champions

Singles
- (Italy) Giulio Zeppieri

Doubles
- Ivan Liutarevich / (Ukraine) Vladyslav Manafov
- Challenger La Manche

The 2023 Challenger La Manche was a professional tennis tournament played on indoor hard courts. It was the 30th edition of the tournament which was part of the 2023 ATP Challenger Tour. It took place in Cherbourg, France between 13 and 19 February 2023.

== Singles main-draw entrants ==
=== Seeds ===
| Country | Player | Rank^{1} | Seed |
|---|---|---|---|
| CAN | Vasek Pospisil | 100 | 1 |
| AUS | John Millman | 139 | 2 |
| FRA | Luca Van Assche | 145 | 3 |
| FRA | Hugo Grenier | 148 | 4 |
| FRA | Geoffrey Blancaneaux | 151 | 5 |
| ITA | Giulio Zeppieri | 166 | 6 |
| FRA | Laurent Lokoli | 174 | 7 |
| SUI | Alexander Ritschard | 185 | 8 |

- ^{1} Rankings are as of 6 February 2023.

=== Other entrants ===
The following players received wildcards into the singles main draw:

- (France) Dan Added
- (France) Clément Chidekh
- (France) Kenny de Schepper

The following players received entry into the singles main draw as alternates:

- (Belgium) Raphaël Collignon
- (Belgium) Michael Geerts
- (Germany) Mats Moraing
- (Spain) Nikolás Sánchez Izquierdo

The following players received entry from the qualifying draw:

- (France) Titouan Droguet
- (Sweden) Karl Friberg
- (Belgium) Gauthier Onclin
- (France) Johan Tatlot
- Alexey Vatutin
- (Kazakhstan) Denis Yevseyev

== Champions ==
=== Singles ===
- (Italy) Giulio Zeppieri def. (France) Titouan Droguet 7–5, 7–6^{(7–4)}.

=== Doubles ===
- Ivan Liutarevich / (Ukraine) Vladyslav Manafov def. (Poland) Karol Drzewiecki / (Poland) Kacper Żuk 7–6^{(12–10)}, 7–6^{(9–7)}.
