= 2025 Szczecin Open – Singles =

Singles
- 2025 Szczecin Open

Final
- Champion: (Argentina) Thiago Agustín Tirante
- Runner-up: (Spain) Pablo Llamas Ruiz
- Score: 6–3, 6–2

Events
Singles	Doubles
- Szczecin Open

Vít Kopřiva was the defending champion but lost in the quarterfinals to Pablo Llamas Ruiz.

Thiago Agustín Tirante won the title after defeating Llamas Ruiz 6–3, 6–2 in the final.

== Seeds ==
1. (Czech Republic) Vít Kopřiva (quarterfinals)
2. (Argentina) Thiago Agustín Tirante (champion)
3. (Italy) Francesco Passaro (second round)
4. (Colombia) Daniel Elahi Galán (second round)
5. (Italy) Andrea Pellegrino (quarterfinals)
6. (Argentina) Román Andrés Burruchaga (first round)
7. (United Kingdom) Jan Choinski (first round)
8. (Brazil) Thiago Monteiro (first round)

== Draw ==
Key

- Q = Qualifier
- WC = Wild card
- LL = Lucky loser
- Alt = Alternate
- ITF = ITF entry
- PR = Protected ranking
- SR = Special ranking
- SE = Special exempt
- JE = Junior exempt
- JR = Junior Accelerator Programme entrant
- CO = College Accelerator Programme entrant
- NG = Next Gen Accelerator Program entrant
- w/o = Walkover
- r = Retired
- d = Defaulted

=== Finals ===
Semifinals
PR	(Spain) Pablo Llamas Ruiz	6^{5}	6	6
(Argentina) Facundo Díaz Acosta	7^{7}	2	3
(France) Geoffrey Blancaneaux	7^{7}	3	0
2	(Argentina) Thiago Agustín Tirante	6^{3}	6	6

Final
PR	(Spain) Pablo Llamas Ruiz	3	2
2	(Argentina) Thiago Agustín Tirante	6	6

=== Top half ===
First round
1	(Czech Republic) V Kopřiva	6	7
(Poland) D Michalski	4	5
(France) L Pavlovic	2	2
NG	(Germany) D Dedura	6	6
(Bulgaria) D Kuzmanov	6	6
WC	(Poland) A Ważny	1	3
PR	(Spain) P Llamas Ruiz	6	6
8	(Brazil) T Monteiro	4	3
3	(Italy) F Passaro	6	6
WC	(Poland) Dorian Juszczak	0	1
I Gakhov	6	0	3
Q	(Germany) H Squire	4	6	6
(Sweden) E Ymer	2	1
(Argentina) F Díaz Acosta	6	6
Alt	(Czech Republic) H Bartoň	5	6	7
6	(Argentina) RA Burruchaga	7	4	5

Second round
1	(Czech Republic) V Kopřiva	6	6
NG	(Germany) D Dedura	2	4
(Bulgaria) D Kuzmanov	6^{5}	1
PR	(Spain) P Llamas Ruiz	7^{7}	6
3	(Italy) F Passaro	6	6^{8}	3
Q	(Germany) H Squire	3	7^{10}	6
(Argentina) F Díaz Acosta	5	6	6
Alt	(Czech Republic) H Bartoň	7	3	4

Quarterfinals
1	(Czech Republic) V Kopřiva	3	6	5
PR	(Spain) P Llamas Ruiz	6	2	7
Q	(Germany) H Squire	6	5	6^{6}
(Argentina) F Díaz Acosta	4	7	7^{8}

Semifinals
PR	(Spain) P Llamas Ruiz	6^{5}	6	6
(Argentina) F Díaz Acosta	7^{7}	2	3

=== Bottom half ===
First round
5	(Italy) A Pellegrino	6	7
WC	(Poland) Mateusz Lange	0	5
(Argentina) S Rodríguez Taverna	5	7	5
Q	(Germany) R Molleker	7	5	7
(France) G Blancaneaux	6	6
Q	(Italy) Lorenzo Bocchi	4	3
Alt	(Spain) N Sánchez Izquierdo	7^{7}	4	6^{4}
4	(Colombia) DE Galán	6^{4}	6	7^{7}
7	(United Kingdom) J Choinski	5	6	3
(Ukraine) V Sachko	7	4	6
(Portugal) T Pereira	7^{10}	2
SE	(Czech Republic) A Paulson	6^{8}	1^{r}
Q	(Czech Republic) M Vrbenský	1	1
Q	(Slovakia) J Kovalík	6	6
Q	A Vatutin	1	1
2	(Argentina) TA Tirante	6	6

Second round
5	(Italy) A Pellegrino	6	6
Q	(Germany) R Molleker	3	2
(France) G Blancaneaux	6	6
4	(Colombia) DE Galán	4	3
(Ukraine) V Sachko	6^{3}	6	6
(Portugal) T Pereira	7^{7}	4	4
Q	(Slovakia) J Kovalík	3	6	5
2	(Argentina) TA Tirante	6	4	7

Quarterfinals
5	(Italy) A Pellegrino	4	2
(France) G Blancaneaux	6	6
(Ukraine) V Sachko	2	6^{3}
2	(Argentina) TA Tirante	6	7^{7}

Semifinals
(France) G Blancaneaux	7^{7}	3	0
2	(Argentina) TA Tirante	6^{3}	6	6
