= 2024 UniCredit Czech Open – Singles =

Singles
- 2024 UniCredit Czech Open

Final
- Champion: (Switzerland) Jérôme Kym
- Runner-up: (Chinese Taipei) Tseng Chun-hsin
- Score: 6–2, 3–6, 6–2

Events
Singles	Doubles
- Czech Open

Dalibor Svrčina was the defending champion but lost in the second round to Lukas Neumayer.

Jérôme Kym won the title after defeating Tseng Chun-hsin 6–2, 3–6, 6–2 in the final.

== Seeds ==
1. (Serbia) Laslo Djere (semifinals)
2. (Japan) Yoshihito Nishioka (second round)
3. (Argentina) Pedro Cachín (semifinals)
4. (Czech Republic) Vít Kopřiva (second round)
5. (Italy) Francesco Passaro (second round)
6. (Moldova) Radu Albot (quarterfinals)
7. (France) Ugo Blanchet (first round)
8. (Czech Republic) Dalibor Svrčina (second round)

== Draw ==
Key

- Q = Qualifier
- WC = Wild card
- LL = Lucky loser
- Alt = Alternate
- ITF = ITF entry
- PR = Protected ranking
- SR = Special ranking
- SE = Special exempt
- JE = Junior exempt
- JR = Junior Accelerator Programme entrant
- CO = College Accelerator Programme entrant
- NG = Next Gen Accelerator Program entrant
- w/o = Walkover
- r = Retired
- d = Defaulted

=== Finals ===
Semifinals
1/WC	(Serbia) Laslo Djere	3	4
(Chinese Taipei) Tseng Chun-hsin	6	6
3	(Argentina) Pedro Cachín	3	6	4
Q	(Switzerland) Jérôme Kym	6	1	6

Final
(Chinese Taipei) Tseng Chun-hsin	2	6	2
Q	(Switzerland) Jérôme Kym	6	3	6

=== Top half ===
First round
1/WC	(Serbia) L Djere	6	6
(Kazakhstan) T Skatov	4	2
(South Korea) G Campaña Lee	7	4	6
WC	(Slovakia) M Kližan	5	6	2
(Austria) L Neumayer	6	6
Alt	(Czech Republic) J Veselý	4	2
(France) V Royer	7^{9}	3	3
8	(Czech Republic) D Svrčina	6^{7}	6	6
4	(Czech Republic) V Kopřiva	6	6
(Italy) S Travaglia	4	4
Q	(United States) T Kodat	1	3
(Chinese Taipei) C-h Tseng	6	6
Q	(Czech Republic) M Vrbenský	6	6
Q	(Egypt) M Safwat	3	4
(Slovakia) A Molčan	1	4
5	(Italy) F Passaro	6	6

Second round
1/WC	(Serbia) L Djere	6	6
(South Korea) G Campaña Lee	4	3
(Austria) L Neumayer	6	6
8	(Czech Republic) D Svrčina	0	2
4	(Czech Republic) V Kopřiva	4	2
(Chinese Taipei) C-h Tseng	6	6
Q	(Czech Republic) M Vrbenský	4	6	6
5	(Italy) F Passaro	6	4	4

Quarterfinals
1/WC	(Serbia) L Djere	7^{7}	6
(Austria) L Neumayer	6^{5}	2
(Chinese Taipei) C-h Tseng	6	6
Q	(Czech Republic) M Vrbenský	3	4

Semifinals
1/WC	(Serbia) L Djere	3	4
(Chinese Taipei) C-h Tseng	6	6

=== Bottom half ===
First round
6	(Moldova) R Albot	6	4	7^{7}
(Spain) B Zapata Miralles	3	6	6^{3}
WC	(Czech Republic) A Paulson	6	4	6
Alt	A Kachmazov	4	6	4
LL	(Czech Republic) M Krumich	1	0
(Belgium) J De Loore	6	6
(Austria) D Novak	2	6	0
3	(Argentina) P Cachín	6	2	6
7	(France) U Blanchet	6^{2}	5
(Ukraine) V Sachko	7^{7}	7
Alt	(Belgium) G Onclin	0	4
(France) K Jacquet	6	6
Q	(France) A Géa	4	3
Q	(Switzerland) J Kym	6	6
Q	(Chile) M Soto	5	3
2	(Japan) Y Nishioka	7	6

Second round
6	(Moldova) R Albot	6^{2}	6	7
WC	(Czech Republic) A Paulson	7^{7}	4	5
(Belgium) J De Loore	6^{9}	3
3	(Argentina) P Cachín	7^{11}	6
(Ukraine) V Sachko	2	6	2
(France) K Jacquet	6	4	6
Q	(Switzerland) J Kym	6	6
2	(Japan) Y Nishioka	4	3

Quarterfinals
6	(Moldova) R Albot	6	5	2
3	(Argentina) P Cachín	3	7	6
(France) K Jacquet	4	4
Q	(Switzerland) J Kym	6	6

Semifinals
3	(Argentina) P Cachín	3	6	4
Q	(Switzerland) J Kym	6	1	6
