= 2025 Szczecin Open – Doubles =

Doubles
- 2025 Szczecin Open

Final
- Champions: (Ukraine) Denys Molchanov (Austria) David Pichler
- Runners-up: Ivan Liutarevich (Spain) Bruno Pujol Navarro
- Score: 3–6, 7–6^{(7–1)}, [10–6]

Events
Singles	Doubles
- Szczecin Open

Guido Andreozzi and Théo Arribagé were the defending champions but only Arribagé chose to defend his title, partnering Grégoire Jacq. They lost in the quarterfinals to Denys Molchanov and David Pichler.

Molchanov and Pichler won the title after defeating Ivan Liutarevich and Bruno Pujol Navarro 3–6, 7–6^{(7–1)}, [10–6] in the final.

== Seeds ==
1. (Poland) Piotr Matuszewski / (Czech Republic) Petr Nouza (semifinals)
2. (France) Théo Arribagé / (France) Grégoire Jacq (quarterfinals)
3. (Brazil) Orlando Luz / (Bolivia) Federico Zeballos (semifinals)
4. (France) Geoffrey Blancaneaux / (Netherlands) Mick Veldheer (quarterfinals)

== Draw ==
Key

- Q = Qualifier
- WC = Wild card
- LL = Lucky loser
- Alt = Alternate
- ITF = ITF entry
- PR = Protected ranking
- SR = Special ranking
- SE = Special exempt
- JE = Junior exempt
- JR = Junior Accelerator Programme entrant
- CO = College Accelerator Programme entrant
- NG = Next Gen Accelerator Program entrant
- w/o = Walkover
- r = Retired
- d = Defaulted

=== Draw ===
First round
1	(Poland) P Matuszewski (Czech Republic) P Nouza	6	7^{7}
(Argentina) RA Burruchaga (Italy) A Pellegrino	1	6^{1}
WC	(Poland) Dorian Juszczak (Poland) Kacper Knitter	5	3
(Romania) V Cornea (Argentina) S Rodríguez Taverna	7	6
4	(France) G Blancaneaux (Netherlands) M Veldheer	4	6	[12]
Alt	(Spain) P Llamas Ruiz (Spain) N Sánchez Izquierdo	6	2	[10]
I Liutarevich (Spain) B Pujol Navarro	6	7^{7}
(Ukraine) V Sachko (Croatia) N Serdarušić	3	6^{4}
(Spain) Í Cervantes (Poland) S Walków	w/o
(Czech Republic) H Bartoň (Czech Republic) V Kopřiva
(Poland) S Kielan (Poland) F Pieczonka	1	2
3	(Brazil) O Luz (Bolivia) F Zeballos	6	6
(Czech Republic) A Paulson (Czech Republic) M Vrbenský	4	4
(Ukraine) D Molchanov (Austria) D Pichler	6	6
(Colombia) DE Galán (Italy) F Passaro
2	(France) T Arribagé (France) G Jacq	w/o

Quarterfinals
1	(Poland) P Matuszewski (Czech Republic) P Nouza	6	6
(Romania) V Cornea (Argentina) S Rodríguez Taverna	4	4
4	(France) G Blancaneaux (Netherlands) M Veldheer	6^{9}	2
I Liutarevich (Spain) B Pujol Navarro	7^{11}	6
(Spain) Í Cervantes (Poland) S Walków	4	7	[3]
3	(Brazil) O Luz (Bolivia) F Zeballos	6	5	[10]
(Ukraine) D Molchanov (Austria) D Pichler	6	6
2	(France) T Arribagé (France) G Jacq	2	2

Semifinals
1	(Poland) P Matuszewski (Czech Republic) P Nouza	6^{2}	4
I Liutarevich (Spain) B Pujol Navarro	7^{7}	6
3	(Brazil) O Luz (Bolivia) F Zeballos	0	4
(Ukraine) D Molchanov (Austria) D Pichler	6	6

Final
I Liutarevich (Spain) B Pujol Navarro	6	6^{1}	[6]
(Ukraine) D Molchanov (Austria) D Pichler	3	7^{7}	[10]
