= 2023 Vitas Gerulaitis Cup =

- Date: 6 – 12 February
- Edition: 1st
- Surface: Hard (indoor)
- Location: Vilnius, Lithuania

Champions

Singles
- (United Kingdom) Liam Broady

Doubles
- Ivan Liutarevich / (Ukraine) Vladyslav Manafov
| Vitas Gerulaitis Cup | · 2024 → |

The 2023 Vitas Gerulaitis Cup was a professional tennis tournament played on indoor hard courts. It was the first edition of the tournament which was part of the 2023 ATP Challenger Tour. It took place in Vilnius, Lithuania between 6 and 12 February 2023.

== Singles main-draw entrants ==
=== Seeds ===
| Country | Player | Rank^{1} | Seed |
|---|---|---|---|
| SUI | Dominic Stricker | 118 | 1 |
| SWE | Elias Ymer | 120 | 2 |
| AUT | Jurij Rodionov | 125 | 3 |
| AUT | Dennis Novak | 144 | 4 |
| GER | Jan-Lennard Struff | 153 | 5 |
| NED | Gijs Brouwer | 159 | 6 |
| CZE | Vít Kopřiva | 160 | 7 |
| FRA | Laurent Lokoli | 169 | 8 |

- ^{1} Rankings are as of 30 January 2023.

=== Other entrants ===
The following players received wildcards into the singles main draw:

- (Lithuania) Edas Butvilas
- (Lithuania) Vilius Gaubas
- (Turkey) Cem İlkel

The following players received entry into the singles main draw as alternates:

- (Belgium) Michael Geerts
- (Poland) Kacper Żuk
- (Germany) Mats Moraing
- (Croatia) Nino Serdarušić

The following players received entry from the qualifying draw:

- Egor Gerasimov
- (Turkey) Ergi Kırkın
- (Germany) Daniel Masur
- (Italy) Julian Ocleppo
- (Germany) Mats Rosenkranz
- (Kazakhstan) Denis Yevseyev

== Champions ==
=== Singles ===
- (United Kingdom) Liam Broady def. (Czech Republic) Zdeněk Kolář 6–4, 6–4.

=== Doubles ===
- Ivan Liutarevich / (Ukraine) Vladyslav Manafov def. (India) Arjun Kadhe / (Germany) Daniel Masur 6–0, 6–2.

== Exhibition ==
As part of the event, an exhibition of unseen photographies of Vitas Gerulaitis life has been launched in the SEB Arena.
