= 2023 Challenger La Manche – Singles =

Singles
- 2023 Challenger La Manche

Final
- Champion: (Italy) Giulio Zeppieri
- Runner-up: (France) Titouan Droguet
- Score: 7–5, 7–6^{(7–4)}

Events
Singles	Doubles
- Challenger La Manche

Benjamin Bonzi was the defending champion but chose not to defend his title.

Giulio Zeppieri won the title after defeating Titouan Droguet 7–5, 7–6^{(7–4)} in the final.

== Seeds ==
1. (Canada) Vasek Pospisil (first round)
2. (Australia) John Millman (first round)
3. (France) Luca Van Assche (quarterfinals)
4. (France) Hugo Grenier (second round)
5. (France) Geoffrey Blancaneaux (second round)
6. (Italy) Giulio Zeppieri (champion)
7. (France) Laurent Lokoli (first round)
8. (Switzerland) Alexander Ritschard (first round)

== Draw ==
Key

- Q = Qualifier
- WC = Wild card
- LL = Lucky loser
- Alt = Alternate
- ITF = ITF entry
- PR = Protected ranking
- SR = Special ranking
- SE = Special exempt
- JE = Junior exempt
- JR = Junior Accelerator Programme entrant
- CO = College Accelerator Programme entrant
- NG = Next Gen Accelerator Program entrant
- w/o = Walkover
- r = Retired
- d = Defaulted

=== Finals ===
Semifinals
6	(Italy) Giulio Zeppieri	6	3	6
(United Kingdom) Jan Choinski	4	6	3
(France) Antoine Escoffier	3	4
Q	(France) Titouan Droguet	6	6

Final
6	(Italy) Giulio Zeppieri	7	7^{7}
Q	(France) Titouan Droguet	5	6^{4}

=== Top half ===
First round
1	(Canada) V Pospisil	4	6^{5}
Alt	(Germany) M Moraing	6	7^{7}
(Switzerland) A Bellier	7^{8}	7
(Turkey) A Çelikbilek	6^{6}	5
I Gakhov	4	6^{6}
Alt	(Belgium) M Geerts	6	7^{8}
(Croatia) M Poljičak	3	6^{5}
6	(Italy) G Zeppieri	6	7^{7}
4	(France) H Grenier	7	6
Q	(Sweden) K Friberg	5	4
(United Kingdom) J Choinski	6	6
Q	(Kazakhstan) D Yevseyev	3	2
Q	(France) J Tatlot	6^{5}	4
(France) G Debru	7^{7}	6
WC	(France) K de Schepper	6^{3}	6	6
8	(Switzerland) A Ritschard	7^{7}	1	4

Second round
Alt	(Germany) M Moraing	6^{6}	6	6
(Switzerland) A Bellier	7^{8}	4	2
Alt	(Belgium) M Geerts	6	5	6^{5}
6	(Italy) G Zeppieri	4	7	7^{7}
4	(France) H Grenier	2	1
(United Kingdom) J Choinski	6	6
(France) G Debru	7^{7}	2	7^{7}
WC	(France) K de Schepper	6^{2}	6	6^{3}

Quarterfinals
Alt	(Germany) M Moraing	5	4
6	(Italy) G Zeppieri	7	6
(United Kingdom) J Choinski	4	6	6
(France) G Debru	6	4	4

Semifinals
6	(Italy) G Zeppieri	6	3	6
(United Kingdom) J Choinski	4	6	3

=== Bottom half ===
First round
7	(France) L Lokoli	2	3
(France) A Escoffier	6	6
(France) E Furness	6	6
(Germany) P Gojowczyk	2	0
(Poland) K Żuk	5	6	6
Q	(Belgium) G Onclin	7	3	4
WC	(France) D Added	3	0
3	(France) L Van Assche	6	6
5	(France) G Blancaneaux	7^{7}	6
Alt	(Belgium) R Collignon	6^{1}	1
WC	(France) C Chidekh	3	1
Q	A Vatutin	6	6
Alt	(Spain) N Sánchez Izquierdo	2	6^{4}
(Belgium) J De Loore	6	7^{7}
Q	(France) T Droguet	6	6
2	(Australia) J Millman	4	3

Second round
(France) A Escoffier	6^{5}	6	7
(France) E Furness	7^{7}	1	5
(Poland) K Żuk	1	2
3	(France) L Van Assche	6	6
5	(France) G Blancaneaux	2	6^{2}
Q	A Vatutin	6	7^{7}
(Belgium) J De Loore	5	3
Q	(France) T Droguet	7	6

Quarterfinals
(France) A Escoffier	6	5	7^{7}
3	(France) L Van Assche	4	7	6^{4}
Q	A Vatutin	6	4	4
Q	(France) T Droguet	4	6	6

Semifinals
(France) A Escoffier	3	4
Q	(France) T Droguet	6	6
