= Challenger Rio de Janeiro =

Tennis tournament in Brazil

Defunct tennis tournament
- Event name: Challenger Rio de Janeiro
- Location: Rio de Janeiro, Brazil
- Venue: Rio Tennis Academy
- Category: ATP Challenger Tour
- Surface: Clay
- Prize money: $53,120
- Website: Website

The Challenger Rio de Janeiro was a professional tennis tournament played on clay courts. It was part of the Association of Tennis Professionals (ATP) Challenger Tour in 2022. It was held in Rio de Janeiro, Brazil.

== Past finals ==
=== Singles ===
Year	Champion	Runner-up	Score
2022	(Italy) Marco Cecchinato	(Germany) Yannick Hanfmann	4–6, 6–4, 6–3

=== Doubles ===
Year	Champions	Runners-up	Score
2022	(Argentina) Guido Andreozzi (Argentina) Guillermo Durán	(Poland) Karol Drzewiecki (Switzerland) Jakub Paul	6–3, 6–2
