= Vitas Gerulaitis Cup =

Tennis tournament in Vilnius

Defunct tennis tournament
- Founded: 2023; 2 years ago
- Location: Vilnius; Lithuania
- Venue: SEB Arena
- Surface: Hard (indoor)
- Website: website
ATP Tour
- Category: Challenger 100
- Prize money: €118,000 + H

The Vitas Gerulaitis Cup was a professional tennis tournament held in Vilnius, Lithuania in 2023. The event was held on the indoor hardcourts of the SEB Arena.

== Background ==
Vitas Gerulaitis was a well known Lithuanian American tennis player and a former #3 ATP who achieved a status of an icon in Lithuania, having famously won the 1977 Australian Open title. With the approval of his family's estate, the organizers chose to name the event after him.

This is not the first tennis event in Vilnius named after Gerulatis as previously ITF tour events organized in Vilnius also had carried the name of the "Vitas Gerulaitis Memorial Cup". Furthermore, the hosting arena had previously been known under the working title "Vitas Gerulaitis Memorial Tennis Centre" and year 2004 was declared as the Vitas Gerulaitis' year by the Lithuanian Tennis Association.

== Past finals ==
=== Singles ===
Year	Champion	Runner-up	Score
2023	(United Kingdom) Liam Broady	(Czech Republic) Zdeněk Kolář	6–4, 6–4

=== Doubles ===
Year	Champions	Runners-up	Score
2023	Ivan Liutarevich (Ukraine) Vladyslav Manafov	(India) Arjun Kadhe (Germany) Daniel Masur	6–0, 6–2

== See also ==
- Vilnius Open
