= Thionville Open =

- 2025 Thionville Open

ATP Challenger Tour
- Location: Thionville, France
- Category: ATP Challenger Tour
- Surface: Hard
- Prize money: 160 680 €
- Website: Website

The Thionville Open is a professional tennis tournament played on hardcourts.Ted Ranghella is the tournament director . It is currently part of the ATP Challenger Tour. It was first held in Thionville, France in 2025.

== Past finals ==
=== Singles ===
Year	Champion	Runner-up	Score
2025	(Croatia) Borna Ćorić	(France) Arthur Bouquier	6–4, 6–4
2026	(Austria) Sebastian Ofner	(Norway) Nicolai Budkov Kjær	6–7^{(5–7)}, 6–3, 7–6^{(9–7)}

=== Doubles ===
Year	Champions	Runners-up	Score
2025	(Switzerland) Jakub Paul (Netherlands) David Pel	(France) Matteo Martineau (France) Luca Sanchez	6–1, 6–4
2026	Ivan Liutarevich (Poland) Filip Pieczonka	(United Kingdom) Joshua Paris (France) Luca Sanchez	7–6^{(13–11)}, 7–6^{(7–5)}
