= Jakub Paul =

Swiss tennis player

- Jakub Paul at the 2025 Swiss Indoors
- Country (sports): Switzerland
- Residence: Chur, Switzerland
- Born: 22 March 1999 (age 27) Chur, Switzerland
- Height: 1.80 m (5 ft 11 in)
- Plays: Right-handed (two-handed backhand)
- Prize money: US $444,703

Singles
- Career record: 0–0 (at ATP Tour level, Grand Slam level, and in Davis Cup)
- Career titles: 0
- Highest ranking: No. 288 (25 August 2025)
- Current ranking: No. 994 (16 November 2026)

Doubles
- Career record: 18–23 (at ATP Tour level, Grand Slam level, and in Davis Cup)
- Career titles: 0
- Highest ranking: No. 54 (19 October 2026)
- Current ranking: No. 56 (16 November 2026)

Grand Slam doubles results
- Australian Open: 2R (2026)
- French Open: 3R (2026)
- Wimbledon: 2R (2026)
- US Open: 1R (2026)
- Last updated on: 16 November 2026.

Jakub Paul (born 22 March 1999) is a Swiss tennis player who specializes in doubles. He has a career high ATP doubles ranking of world No. 54 achieved on 19 October 2026 and a singles ranking of No. 288 achieved in 25 August 2025.

== Career ==
=== 2018–2026: ATP debut, top 100, United Cup finalist ===
Paul made his ATP main draw debut as a wildcard at the 2018 Swiss Open Gstaad in the doubles draw partnering Adrian Bodmer, defeating fellow Swiss wildcards Marc-Andrea Hüsler and Luca Margaroli before losing to top seeds Robin Haase and Matwe Middelkoop in the quarterfinals. At the same tournament he also participated in the qualifying competition where he defeated Matteo Donati.

He received a wildcard for the singles qualifying competition at the 2021 Geneva Open but lost to Pablo Cuevas in three sets. He also entered the 2021 Swiss Open Gstaad as a wildcard in the doubles draw partnering with Leandro Riedi and the pair won their maiden doubles match as a team against Evan King and Max Schnur and then reached the semifinals after a walkover from Zizou Bergs and Tallon Griekspoor.

Paul also entered the 2022 Geneva Open as a wildcard with Riedi where they reached the quarterfinals defeating second seeds Jamie Murray and Bruno Soares. At the same tournament, he received a wildcard for the singles qualifying competition. He also received wildcards in doubles for the 2024 Geneva Open partnering Antoine Bellier and in singles for the qualifying competition.

Paul made his debut at the 2026 United Cup as part of team Switzerland and recorded four wins in mixed doubles with Belinda Bencic, helping the team reach the final of the event for the first time.

== ATP Challenger and ITF Tour finals ==
=== Singles: 11 (5–6) ===
Legend ATP Challenger (0–0) ITF Futures/World Tennis Tour (5–6)	Finals by surface Hard (4–3) Clay (1–2) Grass (0–0) Carpet (0–1)

Result	W–L	Date	Tournament	Tier	Surface	Opponent	Score
Loss	0–1	Feb 2018	Switzerland F1, Oberentfelden	Futures	Carpet (i)	(Germany) Tobias Simon	4–6, 5–7
Loss	0–2	Apr 2019	M15 Sharm El Sheikh, Egypt	WTT	Hard	(Slovakia) Lukas Klein	4–6, 3–6
Win	1–2	Aug 2021	M25, Muttenz, Switzerland	WTT	Clay	(Finland) Otto Virtanen	6-1, 7-5
Win	2–2	Oct 2021	M25, Hamburg, Germany	WTT	Hard (i)	(Germany) Henri Squire	6-4, 6-2
Loss	2–3	Feb 2022	M15, Monastir, Tunisia	WTT	Hard	(Netherlands) Guy den Ouden	5–7, 7–5, 5–7
Win	3–3	Feb 2023	M25, Monastir, Tunisia	WTT	Hard	(Italy) Enrico Dalla Valle	6–3, 7–5
Win	4–3	Nov 2023	M15, Monastir, Tunisia	WTT	Hard	(France) Étienne Donnet	6–2, 6–3
Loss	4–4	Dec 2023	M15, Monastir, Tunisia	WTT	Hard	(Netherlands) Guy den Ouden	3–6, 2–6
Win	5–4	Jan 2024	M15, Monastir, Tunisia	WTT	Hard	Evgenii Tiurnev	7–5, 6–3
Loss	5–5	Jun 2024	M25, Sarajevo, Bosnia & Herzegovina	WTT	Clay	(Bosnia and Herzegovina) Mirza Bašić	1–6, 5–7
Loss	5–6	Sep 2024	M25, Sion, Switzerland	WTT	Clay	(Germany) Christoph Negritu	2–6, 3–6

=== Doubles: 63 (40–23) ===
Legend ATP Challenger (11–11) ITF Futures/World Tennis Tour (29–12)	Finals by surface Hard (19–14) Clay (18–9) Carpet (3–0)

Result	W–L	Date	Tournament	Tier	Surface	Partner	Opponents	Score
Loss	0–1	Aug 2017	Switzerland F3, Collonge	Futures	Clay	(Switzerland) Damien Wenger	(Switzerland) Luca Margaroli (Switzerland) Louroi Martinez	4–6, 3–6
Loss	0–2	Aug 2017	Switzerland F4, Neuchâtel	Futures	Clay	(Switzerland) Rémy Bertola	(France) Hugo Voljacques (France) Rémi Boutillier	3–6, 4–6
Win	1–2	Feb 2018	Switzerland F1, Oberentfelden	Futures	Carpet	(Switzerland) Marc-Andrea Hüsler	(Czech Republic) Jan Mertl (Czech Republic) Michael Vrbenský	4–6, 7–6^{(9–7)}, [10–8]
Win	2–2	Aug 2018	Switzerland F3, Sion	Futures	Clay	(Switzerland) Marc-Andrea Hüsler	(Argentina) Tomás Lipovšek Puches (Argentina) Juan Pablo Ficovich	6–3, 6–4
Loss	2–3	Oct 2018	Israel F13, Ashkelon	Futures	Hard	(United Kingdom) Aidan McHugh	(Netherlands) Sidane Pontjodikromo (Netherlands) Guy Den Heijer	5–7, 4–6
Win	3–3	Mar 2019	M15 Oslo, Norway	WTT	Hard	(Switzerland) Yannik Steinegger	(Norway) Jakob Groener (Norway) Lukas Hellum Lilleengen	6–4, 6–1
Win	4–3	Mar 2019	M15 Sharm El Sheikh, Egypt	WTT	Hard	(Ukraine) Marat Deviatiarov	(Poland) Kacper Żuk (Poland) Daniel Michalski	6–3, 6–4
Win	5–3	Nov 2019	M15 Villers-lès-Nancy, France	WTT	Hard	(Switzerland) Yannik Steinegger	(France) Sebastien Boltz (France) Arthur Bouquier	4–6, 6–4, [13–11]
Loss	5–4	Sep 2020	M25 Klosters, Switzerland	WTT	Clay	(Switzerland) Damien Wenger	(Austria) Neil Oberleitner (Germany) Patrick Zahraj	3–6, 7–6^{(7–5)}, [6–10]
Win	6–4	Oct 2020	M15 Forbach, France	WTT	Carpet	(Switzerland) Luca Castelnuovo	(France) Louis Dussin (France) Arthur Bouquier	7–6^{(7–4)}, 6–1
Win	7–4	Nov 2020	M15 Heraklion, Greece	WTT	Hard	(Netherlands) Mick Veldheer	(Russia) Artem Dubrivnyy (Kazakhstan) Denis Yevseyev	6–1, 6–4
Win	8–4	Feb 2021	M15 Grenoble, France	WTT	Hard	(Switzerland) Yannik Steinegger	(Switzerland) Luca Castelnuovo (Switzerland) Dominic Stephan Stricker	7–5, 6–1
Win	9–4	Mar 2021	M25 Trimbach, Switzerland	WTT	Carpet	(Switzerland) Yannik Steinegger	(Austria) Alexander Erler (Germany) Elmar Ejupovic	6–3, 7–5
Loss	9–5	Apr 2021	M25 Biel, Switzerland	WTT	Hard	(Switzerland) Yannik Steinegger	(Austria) Alexander Erler (Austria) Maximilian Neuchrist	3–6, 6–4, [2–10]
Win	10–5	Jul 2021	M25 Bourg-en-Bresse, France	WTT	Clay	(Sweden) Markus Eriksson	(Switzerland) Leandro Riedi (Switzerland) Damien Wenger	7–6^{(8–6)}, 6–7^{(3–7)}, [10–4]
Win	11–5	Aug 2021	M25 Caslano, Switzerland	WTT	Clay	(Switzerland) Leandro Riedi	(United States) Jamie Vance (United States) Jack Vance	6–0, 6–4
Win	12–5	Sep 2021	M25 Sierre, Switzerland	WTT	Clay	(Switzerland) Yannik Steinegger	(Switzerland) Rémy Bertola (Switzerland) Luca Castelnuovo	6–3, 6–2
Win	13–5	Jun 2022	M25 Klosters, Switzerland	WTT	Clay	(Switzerland) Rémy Bertola	(Austria) Lukas Neumayer (Italy) Alexander Weis	6–4, 7–5
Loss	13–6	Sep 2021	M25 Sierre, Switzerland	WTT	Clay	(Switzerland) Rémy Bertola	(Switzerland) Damien Wenger (Germany) Patrick Zahraj	1–6, 7–6^{(7–1)}, [3–10]
Loss	13–7	Oct 2022	Rio de Janeiro, Brazil	Challenger	Clay	(Poland) Karol Drzewiecki	(Argentina) Guido Andreozzi (Argentina) Guillermo Durán	3–6, 2–6
Loss	13–8	Oct 2022	Coquimbo, Chile	Challenger	Clay	(Poland) Karol Drzewiecki	(Italy) Franco Agamenone (Argentina) Hernán Casanova	3–6, 4–6
Loss	13–9	Feb 2023	M25 Monastir, Tunisia	WTT	Hard	(Peru) Alexander Merino	(Italy) Luca Potenza (Italy) Samuel Vincent Ruggeri	3–6, 3–6
Win	14–9	May 2023	M25 Prague, Czech Republic	WTT	Clay	(United Kingdom) Stuart Parker	(United States) Martin Damm (United States) Alex Rybakov	3–6, 6–3, [10–6]
Win	15–9	May 2023	M25 Most, Czech Republic	WTT	Clay	(United Kingdom) Stuart Parker	(Czech Republic) Ondrej Horak (Czech Republic) Daniel Siniakov	6–3, 6–2
Win	16–9	Jun 2023	M25 Duffel, Belgium	WTT	Clay	(Switzerland) Mika Brunold	(Belgium) Buvaysar Gadamauri (Georgia (country)) Zura Tkemaladze	6–2, 4–6, [10–3]
Win	17–9	Sep 2023	M25 Sion, Switzerland	WTT	Clay	(Switzerland) Rémy Bertola	(United States) Ronan Jachuk (Switzerland) Henry von der Schulenburg	6–1, 6–2
Loss	17–10	Oct 2023	M25 Nevers, France	WTT	Hard	(Switzerland) Yannik Steinegger	(Germany) Jakob Schnaitter (Germany) Mark Wallner	3–6, 4–6
Win	18–10	Oct 2023	M25 Rodez, France	WTT	Hard	(France) Arthur Bouquier	(United Kingdom) Ben Jones (United Kingdom) Joshua Paris	7–6^{(7–5)}, 6–3
Loss	18–11	Oct 2023	Ortisei, Italy	Challenger	Hard	(Austria) Maximilian Neuchrist	(Czech Republic) Andrew Paulson (Czech Republic) Patrik Rikl	6–4, 6–7^{(7–9)}, [9–11]
Win	19–11	Nov 2023	M15 Monastir, Tunisia	WTT	Hard	(Germany) Jakob Schnaitter	(Peru) Alexander Merino (Germany) Christoph Negritu	7–6^{(7–5)}, 7–5
Win	20–11	Nov 2023	M15 Monastir, Tunisia	WTT	Hard	(Germany) Christoph Negritu	(Netherlands) Thiemo de Bakker (Netherlands) Ronetto Van Tilburg	5–0 ret.
Loss	20–12	Jan 2024	M15 Monastir, Tunisia	WTT	Hard	(United Kingdom) Stuart Parker	(Germany) Christoph Negritu (United States) Michael Zhu	3–6, 6–2, [6–10]
Loss	20–13	Jan 2024	M15 Monastir, Tunisia	WTT	Hard	(Germany) Christoph Negritu	Aleksandr Lobanov; Evgenii Tiurnev	7–6^{(5–7)}, 4–6, [8–10]
Win	21–13	Feb 2024	M15 Monastir, Tunisia	WTT	Hard	(Switzerland) Adrien Berrut	(France) Robin Bertrand (France) Benjamin Pietri	6–1, 6–2
Loss	21–14	Feb 2024	M15 Monastir, Tunisia	WTT	Hard	(Slovakia) Miloš Karol	(Peru) Alexander Merino (Germany) Christoph Negritu	3–6, 3–6
Win	22–14	Mar 2024	M25 Trnava, Slovakia	WTT	Hard	(Austria) Neil Oberleitner	(Czech Republic) David Poljak (Czech Republic) Matěj Vocel	7–5, 6–0
Win	23–14	Apr 2024	M25 Sharm El Sheikh, Egypt	WTT	Hard	(United Kingdom) Ben Jones	(Kazakhstan) Grigoriy Lomakin; Ilia Simakin	6–2, 6–2
Win	24–14	Apr 2024	M25 Sharm El Sheikh, Egypt	WTT	Hard	(United Kingdom) Ben Jones	(United Kingdom) Hamish Stewart (United Kingdom) Harry Wendelken	2–6, 6–4, [10–8]
Loss	24–15	May 2024	M25 Kiseljak, Bosnia & Herzegovina	WTT	Clay	(Czech Republic) Matěj Vocel	(Japan) Koki Matsuda (Japan) Rio Noguchi	6–2, 6–7^{(5–7)}, [9–11]
Win	25–15	Jun 2024	M25 Sarajevo, Bosnia & Herzegovina	WTT	Clay	(Czech Republic) Matěj Vocel	(New Zealand) Finn Reynolds (Australia) Adam Taylor	6–0, 6–4
Win	26–15	Jun 2024	M25 Villeneuve-Loubet, France	WTT	Clay	(Switzerland) Rémy Bertola	(France) Dan Added (France) Arthur Reymond	3–6, 7–6^{(7–3)}, [14–12]
Win	27–15	Jun 2024	M25 Klosters, Switzerland	WTT	Clay	(Switzerland) Rémy Bertola	(Zimbabwe) Benjamin Lock (Zimbabwe) Courtney John Lock	6–4, 7–5
Win	28–15	Jul 2024	Troyes, France	Challenger	Clay	(Austria) Neil Oberleitner	(Uzbekistan) Denis Istomin; Evgeny Karlovskiy	6–4, 7–6^{(7–1)}
Win	29–15	Aug 2024	M25 Muttenz, Switzerland	WTT	Clay	(Czech Republic) Matěj Vocel	(Switzerland) Johan Nikles (Switzerland) Damien Wenger	6–4, 7–2
Win	30–15	Aug 2024	M25 Sion, Switzerland	WTT	Clay	(Czech Republic) Matěj Vocel	(Switzerland) Johan Nikles (Switzerland) Damien Wenger	6–2, 6–0
Loss	30–16	Oct 2024	Roanne, France	Challenger	Hard (i)	(Czech Republic) Matěj Vocel	(Netherlands) David Pel (Colombia) Nicolas Barrientos	6–4, 3–6, [6-10]
Loss	30–17	Oct 2024	Saint-Brieuc, France	Challenger	Hard (i)	(Czech Republic) Matěj Vocel	(France) Geoffrey Blancaneaux (France) Gabriel Debru	3–3, def.
Loss	30–18	Oct 2024	Brest, France	Challenger	Hard (i)	(Czech Republic) Matěj Vocel	(Colombia) Nicolás Barrientos (Tunisia) Skander Mansouri	5–7, 6–4, [5–10]
Win	31–18	Nov 2024	Yokkaichi, Japan	Challenger	Hard	(Australia) Thomas Fancutt	(Japan) Kokoro Isomura (Japan) Hikaru Shiraishi	6–2, 7–5
Win	32–18	Feb 2025	Koblenz, Germany	Challenger	Hard (i)	(Netherlands) David Pel	(France) Geoffrey Blancaneaux (United Kingdom) Joshua Paris	Walkover
Win	33–18	Feb 2025	Lille, France	Challenger	Hard (i)	(Netherlands) David Pel	(Poland) Karol Drzewiecki (Poland) Piotr Matuszewski	6–3, 6–4
Loss	33–19	Mar 2025	Lugano, Switzerland	Challenger	Hard (i)	(Czech Republic) Matěj Vocel	(Canada) Cleeve Harper (United Kingdom) David Stevenson	6–4, 3–6, [8–10]
Win	34–19	Mar 2025	Thionville, France	Challenger	Hard (i)	(Netherlands) David Pel	(France) Matteo Martineau (France) Luca Sanchez	6–1, 6–4
Loss	34–20	Apr 2025	Madrid, Spain	Challenger	Clay	(Netherlands) David Pel	(Portugal) Francisco Cabral (Austria) Lucas Miedler	6–7^{(2–7)}, 4–6
Win	35–20	Jul 2025	Trieste, Italy	Challenger	Clay	(Czech Republic) Matěj Vocel	(Netherlands) Robin Haase (Denmark) Johannes Ingildsen	7–5, 6–1
Loss	35–21	Feb 2026	Pau, France	Challenger	Hard (i)	(Czech Republic) Matěj Vocel	(India) Sriram Balaji (Austria) Neil Oberleitner	6–1, 3–6, [11–13]
Loss	35–22	Feb 2026	Lille, France	Challenger	Hard (i)	(Czech Republic) Matěj Vocel	Ivan Liutarevich (Poland) Filip Pieczonka	4–6, 6–3, [8–10]
Win	36–22	Feb 2026	Saint-Brieuc, France	Challenger	Hard (i)	(Czech Republic) Matěj Vocel	(France) Arthur Reymond (France) Luca Sanchez	6–7^{(4–7)}, 7–6^{(7–2)}, [10–5]
Win	37–22	Mar 2026	Naples, Italy	Challenger	Clay	(Czech Republic) Matěj Vocel	(Germany) Tim Rühl (Netherlands) Mick Veldheer	6–2, 6–4
Loss	37–23	Apr 2026	Monza, Italy	Challenger	Clay	(Czech Republic) Matěj Vocel	(Belgium) Sander Gillé (Netherlands) Sem Verbeek	6–4, 6–7^{(3–7)}, [8–10]
Win	38–23	Jun 2026	Parma, Italy	Challenger	Clay	(United States) Ryan Seggerman	(Thailand) Pruchya Isaro (India) Niki Kaliyanda Poonacha	6–2, 7–6^{(7–5)}
Win	39–23	Sep 2026	Saint-Tropez, France	Challenger	Hard	(Czech Republic) Matěj Vocel	(France) Constantin Bittoun Kouzmine (Germany) Daniel Masur	6–4, 6–3
Win	40–23	Nov 2026	Orléans, France	Challenger	Hard (i)	(Czech Republic) Matěj Vocel	Ivan Liutarevich (Poland) Filip Pieczonka	7–6^{(7–4)}, 7–6^{(7–5)}
