= Ivan Liutarevich =

Belarusian tennis player

- Country (sports): Belarus
- Born: 20 February 1996 (age 30) Minsk, Belarus
- Height: 1.96 m (6 ft 5 in)
- Plays: Right-handed (two-handed backhand)
- Coach: Daniel Beliaev
- Prize money: US $257,448

Singles
- Career record: 0–0
- Career titles: 0
- Highest ranking: No. 693 (22 August 2022)

Doubles
- Career record: 2–6
- Career titles: 9 Challenger, 20 ITF
- Highest ranking: No. 81 (16 November 2026)
- Current ranking: No. 81 (16 November 2026)

Grand Slam doubles results
- Wimbledon: 2R (2026)
- US Open: 1R (2026)
- Last updated on: 16 November 2026.

Ivan Liutarevich (born 20 February 1996) is a Belarusian tennis player. He has a career high ATP doubles ranking of world No. 81 achieved on 16 November 2026 and a singles ranking of No. 693 achieved on 22 August 2022. Liutarevich has won nine ATP Challenger doubles titles.

== Career ==
Liutarevich won his maiden Challenger title at the 2023 Vitas Gerulaitis Cup.

== ATP Challenger and ITF finals ==
=== Singles ===
Legend ATP Challenger (0–0) ITF Futures (0–1)	Finals by surface Hard (0–1) Clay (0–0)

Result	W–L	Date	Tournament	Tier	Surface	Opponent	Score
Loss	0–1	Aug 2019	M15 Minsk, Belarus	World Tennis Tour	Hard	(Russia) Artem Dubrivnyy	3–6, 6–7^{(5–7)}

=== Doubles ===
Legend ATP Challenger (9–7) ITF Futures (20–11)	Finals by surface Hard (20–11) Clay (9–7)

Result	W–L	Date	Tournament	Tier	Surface	Partner	Opponents	Score
Loss	0–1	Oct 2014	Belarus F4, Minsk	Futures	Hard	(Belarus) Artur Dubinski	(Belarus) Sergey Betov (Belarus) Aliaksandr Bury	6–7^{(4–7)}, 6–7^{(5–7)}
Loss	0–2	Aug 2017	Belarus F2, Minsk	Futures	Hard	(Ukraine) Vadym Ursu	(United States) Maxime Cressy (France) Ugo Humbert	6–4, 3–6, [5–10]
Loss	0–3	Aug 2017	Belarus F3, Minsk	Futures	Hard	(Ukraine) Vadym Ursu	(Ukraine) Vladyslav Manafov (Belarus) Yaraslav Shyla	3–6, 6–2, [4–10]
Win	1–3	Nov 2017	Estonia F4, Pärnu	Futures	Hard	(Ukraine) Denys Mylokostov	(Ukraine) Marat Deviatiarov (Russia) Alexander Igoshin	4–6, 6–3, [12–10]
Win	2–3	Mar 2018	Russia F1, Moscow	Futures	Hard	(Belarus) Sergey Betov	(Russia) Mikhail Fufygin (Estonia) Vladimir Ivanov	6–2, 6–4
Loss	2–4	Aug 2018	Belarus F1, Minsk	Futures	Hard	(Belarus) Sergey Betov	(Israel) Igor Smilansky (Brazil) Fernando Yamacita	3–6, 0–6
Win	3–4	Sep 2018	Tunisia F33, Monastir	Futures	Hard	(Tunisia) Skander Mansouri	(Turkey) Altuğ Çelikbilek (France) Florent Diep	6–3, 6–1
Win	4–4	Nov 2018	Tunisia F41, Monastir	Futures	Hard	(Ukraine) Vadym Ursu	(Portugal) Fred Gil (Brazil) Diego Matos	6–2, 6–7^{(3–7)}, [10–8]
Win	5–4	Feb 2019	M25 Aktobe, Kazakhstan	World Tennis Tour	Hard	(Russia) Teymuraz Gabashvili	(Russia) Savriyan Danilov (Netherlands) Niels Lootsma	6–3, 6–4
Loss	5–5	Apr 2019	M25 Shymkent, Kazakhstan	World Tennis Tour	Clay	(Russia) Yan Bondarevskiy	(Uzbekistan) Sanjar Fayziev (Ukraine) Vladyslav Manafov	2–6, 1–6
Win	6–5	Apr 2019	M25 Shymkent, Kazakhstan	World Tennis Tour	Clay	(Russia) Teymuraz Gabashvili	(India) Sidharth Rawat (India) Manish Sureshkumar	6–4, 6–2
Win	7–5	Jul 2019	M15 Telavi, Georgia	World Tennis Tour	Clay	(Czech Republic) David Poljak	(Russia) Shalva Dzhanashiya (Russia) Yan Sabanin	6–3, 6–4
Win	8–5	Sep 2019	M25 Almaty, Kazakhstan	World Tennis Tour	Hard	(Ukraine) Vladyslav Manafov	(Kazakhstan) Grigoriy Lomakin (Georgia (country)) George Tsivadze	7–5, 6–2
Win	9–5	Dec 2019	M15 Doha, Qatar	World Tennis Tour	Hard	(Ukraine) Danylo Kalenichenko	(Morocco) Adam Moundir (Japan) Rio Noguchi	6–3, 7–6^{(7–3)}
Win	10–5	Feb 2020	M25 Aktobe, Kazakhstan	World Tennis Tour	Hard	(Ukraine) Vladyslav Manafov	(Estonia) Vladimir Ivanov (Russia) Maxim Ratniuk	7–5, 7–6^{(7–5)}
Win	11–5	Feb 2021	M15 Nur-Sultan, Kazakhstan	World Tennis Tour	Hard	(Belarus) Yaraslav Shyla	(Italy) Francesco Forti (Italy) Francesco Maestrelli	7–6^{(7–4)}, 7–6^{(7–4)}
Win	12–5	Feb 2021	M15 Nur-Sultan, Kazakhstan	World Tennis Tour	Hard	(Belarus) Yaraslav Shyla	(Poland) Wojciech Marek (Poland) Yann Wójcik	6–4, 6–2
Win	13–5	Mar 2021	M15 Kazan, Russia	World Tennis Tour	Hard	(Belarus) Yaraslav Shyla	(Russia) Mikhail Fufygin (Russia) Boris Pokotilov	4–6, 7–5, [10–7]
Loss	13–6	Apr 2021	M15 Shymkent, Kazakhstan	World Tennis Tour	Clay	(Ukraine) Vladyslav Manafov	(Belarus) Aleksei Khomich (Belarus) Yaraslav Shyla	5–7, 6–3, [6–10]
Loss	13–7	Apr 2021	M15 Shymkent, Kazakhstan	World Tennis Tour	Clay	(Ukraine) Vladyslav Manafov	(Russia) Ivan Denisov (Russia) Ivan Gakhov	6–3, 5–7, [5–10]
Loss	13–8	Oct 2021	M25 Nur-Sultan, Kazakhstan	World Tennis Tour	Hard	(Russia) Konstantin Kravchuk	(Russia) Andrey Kuznetsov (Kazakhstan) Beibit Zhukayev	6–7^{(5–7)}, 4–6
Win	14–8	Jan 2022	M25 Vilnius, Lithuania	World Tennis Tour	Hard	(Kazakhstan) Denis Yevseyev	(Hungary) Péter Fajta (Hungary) Fábián Marozsán	6–4, 7–6^{(7–4)}
Win	15–8	Feb 2022	M25 Nur-Sultan, Kazakhstan	World Tennis Tour	Hard	(Ukraine) Vladyslav Manafov	(Russia) Petr Bar Biryukov (Russia) Evgeny Karlovskiy	6–4, 6–7^{(1–7)}, [11–9]
Win	16–8	Feb 2022	M25 Nur-Sultan, Kazakhstan	World Tennis Tour	Hard	(Ukraine) Vladyslav Manafov	(Kazakhstan) Timur Khabibulin (Kazakhstan) Beibit Zhukayev	6–4, 6–0
Win	17–8	Mar 2022	M15 Antalya, Turkey	World Tennis Tour	Clay	(Russia) Ivan Gakhov	(Turkey) Umut Akkoyun (Turkey) Mert Naci Türker	6–4, 6–2
Win	18–8	May 2022	M25 Ulcinj, Montenegro	World Tennis Tour	Clay	(Italy) Marcello Serafini	(Romania) Cezar Crețu (France) Valentin Royer	4–6, 6–1, [10–6]
Loss	18–9	Jun 2022	M15 Budva, Montenegro	World Tennis Tour	Clay	(Russia) Bogdan Bobrov	(Switzerland) Louroi Martinez (Switzerland) Damien Wenger	4–6, 3–6
Loss	18–10	Jul 2022	M25 Nur-Sultan, Kazakhstan	World Tennis Tour	Hard	(Kazakhstan) Denis Yevseyev	(Estonia) Daniil Glinka (Estonia) Karl Kiur Saar	6–7^{(4–7)}, 3–6
Loss	18–11	Aug 2022	M25 Tbilisi, Georgia	World Tennis Tour	Hard	(Czech Republic) David Poljak	(South Korea) Hong Seong-chan (South Korea) Song Min-kyu	5–7, 2–6
Win	19–11	Aug 2022	M25 Tbilisi, Georgia	World Tennis Tour	Hard	(Kazakhstan) Grigoriy Lomakin	(Belarus) Erik Arutiunian (Belarus) Daniil Ostapenkov	3–6, 7–6^{(7–4)}, [10–5]
Win	20–11	Dec 2022	M15 Sharm El Sheikh, Egypt	World Tennis Tour	Hard	(Russia) Yan Bondarevskiy	(Russia) Alexandr Binda (Russia) Ilia Simakin	6–4, 6–2
Win	21–11	Feb 2023	Vilnius, Lithuania	Challenger	Hard (i)	(Ukraine) Vladyslav Manafov	(India) Arjun Kadhe (Germany) Daniel Masur	6–0, 6–2
Win	22–11	Feb 2023	Cherbourg, France	Challenger	Hard (i)	(Ukraine) Vladyslav Manafov	(Poland) Karol Drzewiecki (Poland) Kacper Żuk	7–6^{(12–10)}, 7–6^{(9–7)}
Win	23–11	Apr 2023	Madrid, Spain	Challenger	Clay	(Ukraine) Vladyslav Manafov	(Finland) Patrik Niklas-Salminen (Netherlands) Bart Stevens	6–4, 6–4
Win	24–11	Aug 2023	San Marino, San Marino	Challenger	Clay	(Ukraine) Vladyslav Manafov	(France) Theo Arribage (France) Luca Sanchez	6–4, 7–6^{(10–8)}
Win	25–11	Jun 2024	Prostějov, Czech Republic	Challenger	Clay	(Spain) Sergio Martos Gornés	(Netherlands) Matwé Middelkoop (Austria) Philipp Oswald	6–1, 6–4
Loss	25–12	Aug 2024	Como, Italy	Challenger	Clay	(Romania) Alexandru Jecan	(Romania) Victor Vlad Cornea (Ukraine) Denys Molchanov	2–6, 3–6
Loss	25–13	Feb 2025	Manama, Bahrain	Challenger	Hard	(France) Luca Sanchez	(Ukraine) Vitaliy Sachko (Kazakhstan) Beibit Zhukayev	4–6, 0–6
Win	26–13	Apr 2025	San Luis Potosí, Mexico	Challenger	Clay	(United Kingdom) Marcus Willis	(United States) Trey Hilderbrand (United States) Alfredo Perez	6–3, 6–4
Loss	26–14	Sep 2025	Szczecin, Poland	Challenger	Clay	(Spain) Bruno Pujol Navarro	(Ukraine) Denys Molchanov (Austria) David Pichler	6–3, 6–7^{(1–7)}, [6–10]
Win	27–14	Feb 2026	Lille, France	Challenger	Hard (i)	(Poland) Filip Pieczonka	(Switzerland) Jakub Paul (Czech Republic) Matěj Vocel	6–4, 3–6, [10–8]
Win	28–14	Mar 2026	Thionville, France	Challenger	Hard (i)	(Poland) Filip Pieczonka	(United Kingdom) Joshua Paris (France) Luca Sanchez	7–6^{(13–11)}, 7–6^{(7–5)}
Win	29–14	Apr 2026	Mauthausen, Austria	Challenger	Clay	(Poland) Filip Pieczonka	(Spain) Àlex Martínez (Spain) Bruno Pujol Navarro	6–3, 3–6, [12–10]
Loss	29–15	Jun 2026	Prostějov, Czech Republic	Challenger	Clay	(Poland) Filip Pieczonka	(Slovakia) Miloš Karol (Czech Republic) Andrew Paulson	3–6, 3–6
Loss	29–16	Aug 2026	Cancún, Mexico	Challenger	Hard	(Mexico) Miguel Ángel Reyes-Varela	(India) Sriram Balaji (India) Anirudh Chandrasekar	3–6, 6–7^{(4–7)}
Loss	29–17	Sep 2026	Rennes, France	Challenger	Hard (i)	(United Kingdom) Joshua Paris	(Netherlands) Sander Arends (Netherlands) Bart Stevens	1–6, 1–6
Loss	29–18	Nov 2026	Orléans, France	Challenger	Hard (i)	(Poland) Filip Pieczonka	(Switzerland) Jakub Paul (Czech Republic) Matěj Vocel	6–7^{(4–7)}, 6–7^{(5–7)}
