= Luca Sanchez =

French tennis player

- Country (sports): France
- Born: 18 March 1999 (age 27) Perpignan, France
- Height: 1.80 m (5 ft 11 in)
- Plays: Right-handed (one-handed backhand)
- Coach: Mathieu Olieu
- Prize money: US $256,314

Singles
- Career record: 0–0 (at ATP Tour level, Grand Slam level, and in Davis Cup)
- Career titles: 0
- Highest ranking: No. 1,875 (4 January 2021)

Doubles
- Career record: 4–19 (at ATP Tour level, Grand Slam level, and in Davis Cup)
- Career titles: 6 Challengers, 6 ITF
- Highest ranking: No. 63 (21 September 2026)
- Current ranking: No. 63 (21 September 2026)

Grand Slam doubles results
- Australian Open: 2R (2026)
- French Open: 2R (2023, 2026)
- Wimbledon: 1R (2026)
- US Open: 1R (2026)

Grand Slam mixed doubles results
- French Open: 1R (2025, 2026)
- Last updated on: 21 September 2026.

Luca Sanchez (born 18 March 1999) is a French tennis player who specializes in doubles. He has a career-high ATP doubles ranking of world No. 63 achieved on 21 September 2026 and a singles ranking of No. 1,875 achieved on 4 January 2021.

== Career ==
Sanchez made his ATP main draw debut at the 2023 Open Sud de France after entering the doubles main draw as alternates with Théo Arribagé.

In February 2023, Sanchez won his first match on the ATP Tour at the 2023 Open 13 Provence in Marseille, partnering with Petros Tsitsipas, reaching the second round after receiving a wildcard for the main draw.

In June 2023, Sanchez won his first Grand Slam match at the 2023 French Open, partnering with Théo Arribagé, after receiving a wildcard for the main draw.

He also received a wildcard for the 2024 French Open partnering Alexandre Müller.
