= 2024 Saint-Tropez Open – Doubles =

Doubles
- 2024 Saint-Tropez Open

Final
- Champions: (Netherlands) Sander Arends (United Kingdom) Luke Johnson
- Runners-up: (Sweden) André Göransson (Netherlands) Sem Verbeek
- Score: 3–6, 6–3, [10–4]

Events
Singles	Doubles
← 2023 ·	Saint-Tropez Open	· 2025 →

Dan Added and Albano Olivetti were the defending champions but only Added chose to defend his title, partnering Jonathan Eysseric. They lost in the first round to Daniel Cukierman and Ivan Liutarevich.

Sander Arends and Luke Johnson won the title after defeating André Göransson and Sem Verbeek 3–6, 6–3, [10–4] in the final.

== Seeds ==
1. (Sweden) André Göransson / (Netherlands) Sem Verbeek (final)
2. (Netherlands) Sander Arends / (United Kingdom) Luke Johnson (champions)
3. (Monaco) Romain Arneodo / (France) Théo Arribagé (semifinals)
4. (Spain) Sergio Martos Gornés / (Greece) Petros Tsitsipas (first round)

== Draw ==
=== Key ===
- Q = Qualifier
- WC = Wild card
- LL = Lucky loser
- Alt = Alternate
- ITF = ITF entry
- PR = Protected ranking
- SR = Special ranking
- SE = Special exempt
- JE = Junior exempt
- JR = Junior Accelerator Programme entrant
- CO = College Accelerator Programme entrant
- NG = Next Gen Accelerator Program entrant
- w/o = Walkover
- r = Retired
- d = Defaulted

=== Draw ===
First round
1	(Sweden) A Göransson (Netherlands) S Verbeek	6	6
WC	(France) Alexandre Aubriot (France) Louis Tessa	1	4
(France) H Mayot (France) L Sanchez	3	3
(Poland) M Kaśnikowski (Poland) K Majchrzak	6	6
3	(Monaco) R Arneodo (France) T Arribagé	7^{7}	6
(India) A Chandrasekar (India) N Kaliyanda Poonacha	6^{2}	3
(Israel) D Cukierman; I Liutarevich	6	7^{8}
(France) D Added (France) J Eysseric	2	6^{6}
(United States) R Seggerman (Poland) S Walków	4	6^{5}
(Lebanon) B Hassan (Spain) D Vega Hernández	6	7^{7}
(United States) V Kirkov (Finland) P Niklas-Salminen	4	7^{7}	[10]
4	(Spain) S Martos Gornés (Greece) Pe Tsitsipas	6	6^{4}	[7]
(United States) G Goldhoff (Brazil) F Romboli	6	3	[13]
WC	(France) Maé Malige (France) A Reymond	2	6	[11]
(Switzerland) A Bellier (France) U Blanchet	2	2
2	(Netherlands) S Arends (United Kingdom) L Johnson	6	6

Quarterfinals
1	(Sweden) A Göransson (Netherlands) S Verbeek	7	6
(Poland) M Kaśnikowski (Poland) K Majchrzak	5	1
3	(Monaco) R Arneodo (France) T Arribagé	6	6
(Israel) D Cukierman; I Liutarevich	2	1
(Lebanon) B Hassan (Spain) D Vega Hernández	6	4	[11]
(United States) V Kirkov (Finland) P Niklas-Salminen	4	6	[9]
(United States) G Goldhoff (Brazil) F Romboli	1	4
2	(Netherlands) S Arends (United Kingdom) L Johnson	6	6

Semifinals
1	(Sweden) A Göransson (Netherlands) S Verbeek	6	6
3	(Monaco) R Arneodo (France) T Arribagé	4	4
(Lebanon) B Hassan (Spain) D Vega Hernández	6	5	[11]
2	(Netherlands) S Arends (United Kingdom) L Johnson	4	7	[13]

Final
1	(Sweden) A Göransson (Netherlands) S Verbeek	6	3	[4]
2	(Netherlands) S Arends (United Kingdom) L Johnson	3	6	[10]
