= 2023 Saint-Tropez Open – Singles =

Singles
- 2023 Saint-Tropez Open

Final
- Champion: (France) Constant Lestienne
- Runner-up: (United Kingdom) Liam Broady
- Score: 4–6, 6–3, 6–4

Events
Singles	Doubles
← 2022 ·	Saint-Tropez Open	· 2024 →

Mattia Bellucci was the defending champion but lost in the first round to Emilio Nava.

Constant Lestienne won the title after defeating Liam Broady 4–6, 6–3, 6–4 in the final.

== Seeds ==
1. (France) Ugo Humbert (withdrew)
2. (Austria) Sebastian Ofner (quarterfinals, retired)
3. (France) Grégoire Barrère (second round)
4. (France) Richard Gasquet (first round)
5. (United States) Michael Mmoh (semifinals, retired)
6. (France) Hugo Gaston (first round)
7. (Belgium) David Goffin (withdrew)
8. (France) Benjamin Bonzi (withdrew)
9. (United Kingdom) Liam Broady (final)

== Draw ==
=== Key ===
- Q = Qualifier
- WC = Wild card
- LL = Lucky loser
- Alt = Alternate
- SE = Special exempt
- PR = Protected ranking
- ITF = ITF entry
- JE = Junior exempt
- w/o = Walkover
- r = Retired
- d = Defaulted
- SR = Special ranking

=== Finals ===
Semifinals
(Moldova) Radu Albot	6^{3}	5
9	(United Kingdom) Liam Broady	7^{7}	7
5	(United States) Michael Mmoh	3^{r}
(France) Constant Lestienne	5

Final
9	(United Kingdom) Liam Broady	6	3	4
(France) Constant Lestienne	4	6	6

=== Top half ===
First round
LL	(France) K Jacquet	2	5
Q	(Estonia) M Lajal	6	7
(Netherlands) G Brouwer	6	6
LL	(France) M Bourgue	2	2
(France) H Grenier	4	3
(Moldova) R Albot	6	6
LL	(Moldova) A Cozbinov	4	3
Q	(Germany) P Gojowczyk	6	6
3	(France) G Barrère	6	6
WC	(France) A Géa	2	4
(France) A Cazaux	6	6
WC	(France) U Blanchet	4	4
(Slovakia) L Klein	4	6	6
Q	(France) Jules Marie	6	3	3
Q	(France) D Added	0	6	4
9	(United Kingdom) L Broady	6	3	6

Second round
Q	(Estonia) M Lajal	5	1
(Netherlands) G Brouwer	7	6
(Moldova) R Albot	6	6
Q	(Germany) P Gojowczyk	4	4
3	(France) G Barrère	4	6	3
(France) A Cazaux	6	4	6
(Slovakia) L Klein	2	2
9	(United Kingdom) L Broady	6	6

Quarterfinals
(Netherlands) G Brouwer	3	6	2
(Moldova) R Albot	6	3	6
(France) A Cazaux	6^{4}	0^{r}
9	(United Kingdom) L Broady	7^{7}	3

Semifinals
(Moldova) R Albot	6^{3}	5
9	(United Kingdom) L Broady	7^{7}	7

=== Bottom half ===
First round
5	(United States) M Mmoh	6	1	6
(Netherlands) J de Jong	4	6	4
(France) A Escoffier	4	7^{7}	2
LL	(Ivory Coast) E Coulibaly	6	6^{2}	6
(United States) Em Nava	4	6	7
Alt	(Italy) M Bellucci	6	1	5
(Italy) G Zeppieri	6	6
4	(France) R Gasquet	3	2
6	(France) H Gaston	3	2
(France) C Lestienne	6	6
Q	(United Kingdom) B Harris	3	6	2
Alt	(France) H Mayot	6	4	6
Q	(Ukraine) O Krutykh	2	6	7^{7}
(Sweden) E Ymer	6	3	6^{1}
(Italy) L Nardi	4	4
2	(Austria) S Ofner	6	6

Second round
5	(United States) M Mmoh	6	6
LL	(Ivory Coast) E Coulibaly	4	2
(United States) Em Nava	6^{2}	2
(Italy) G Zeppieri	7^{7}	6
(France) C Lestienne	6	3	6
Alt	(France) H Mayot	3	6	3
Q	(Ukraine) O Krutykh	6	3	4
2	(Austria) S Ofner	4	6	6

Quarterfinals
5	(United States) M Mmoh	3	6	6
(Italy) G Zeppieri	6	3	4
(France) C Lestienne	6	0
2	(Austria) S Ofner	1	0^{r}

Semifinals
5	(United States) M Mmoh	3^{r}
(France) C Lestienne	5
