= 2025 Saint-Tropez Open – Singles =

Singles
- 2025 Saint-Tropez Open

Final
- Champion: (Tunisia) Moez Echargui
- Runner-up: (France) Dan Added
- Score: 6–3, 6–4

Events
| Singles | Doubles |
| ← 2024 · | Saint-Tropez Open | · 2026 → |

Gijs Brouwer was the defending champion but chose not to defend his title.

Moez Echargui won the title after defeating Dan Added 6–3, 6–4 in the final.

== Seeds ==
1. (Spain) Martín Landaluce (quarterfinals)
2. (Italy) Matteo Gigante (first round)
3. (France) Pierre-Hugues Herbert (first round)
4. (France) Ugo Blanchet (first round)
5. (Switzerland) Stan Wawrinka (semifinals, withdrew)
6. (France) Harold Mayot (second round)
7. (Estonia) Mark Lajal (semifinals)
8. (France) Titouan Droguet (quarterfinals)

== Draw ==
=== Key ===
- Q = Qualifier
- WC = Wild card
- LL = Lucky loser
- Alt = Alternate
- ITF = ITF entry
- PR = Protected ranking
- SR = Special ranking
- SE = Special exempt
- JE = Junior exempt
- JR = Junior Accelerator Programme entrant
- CO = College Accelerator Programme entrant
- NG = Next Gen Accelerator Program entrant
- w/o = Walkover
- r = Retired
- d = Defaulted

=== Finals ===
Semifinals
5 | (Switzerland) Stan Wawrinka
Alt | (France) Dan Added | w/o
(Tunisia) Moez Echargui | 6^{4} | 6 | 6
7 | (Estonia) Mark Lajal | 7^{7} | 1 | 2

Final
Alt | (France) Dan Added | 3 | 4
(Tunisia) Moez Echargui | 6 | 6

=== Top half ===
First round
1 | (Spain) M Landaluce | 6 | 6
LL | (France) F Bax | 0 | 4
Alt | (Slovakia) N Gombos | 6 | 3 | 2
Alt | (Czech Republic) M Gengel | 2 | 6 | 6
(Monaco) V Vacherot | 4 | 6 | 4
WC | (France) R Bertrand | 6 | 3 | 6
(Germany) J Engel | 3 | 3
5 | (Switzerland) S Wawrinka | 6 | 6
3 | (France) P-H Herbert | 7 | 6^{4} | 5
(Kazakhstan) M Kukushkin | 5 | 7^{7} | 7
Q | (France) T Paris | 6 | 3 | 6
WC | (France) G Barrère | 4 | 6 | 0
Alt | (France) D Added | 6 | 6
(France) K Jacquet | 2 | 4
Q | A Vatutin | 0 | 5
6 | (France) H Mayot | 6 | 7

Second round
1 | (Spain) M Landaluce | 6 | 4
Alt | (Czech Republic) M Gengel | 1 | 0^{r}
WC | (France) R Bertrand | 2 | 3
5 | (Switzerland) S Wawrinka | 6 | 6
(Kazakhstan) M Kukushkin | 6^{5} | 4
Q | (France) T Paris | 7^{7} | 6
Alt | (France) D Added | 4 | 6 | 7^{8}
6 | (France) H Mayot | 6 | 1 | 6^{6}

Quarterfinals
1 | (Spain) M Landaluce | 4 | 1
5 | (Switzerland) S Wawrinka | 6 | 6
Q | (France) T Paris | 3 | 3
Alt | (France) D Added | 6 | 6

Semifinals
5 | (Switzerland) S Wawrinka
Alt | (France) D Added | w/o

=== Bottom half ===
First round
8 | (France) T Droguet | 6 | 6
Q | (Italy) Luca Potenza | 4 | 2
WC | (France) Maé Malige | 6 | 6
PR | (United States) M Mmoh | 4 | 4
Q | (Mexico) R Pacheco Méndez | 3 | 6 | 6
Q | (France) Étienne Donnet | 6 | 3 | 2
(Tunisia) M Echargui | 6 | 6
4 | (France) U Blanchet | 3 | 3
7 | (Estonia) M Lajal | 6 | 6
(France) S Gueymard Wayenburg | 2 | 3
Alt | (Slovakia) A Molčan | 7^{7} | 6
LL | (Belgium) M Geerts | 6^{5} | 1
Q | (United States) T Hilderbrand | 4 | 1
(France) H Grenier | 6 | 6
Alt | (Lithuania) E Butvilas | 4 | 6 | 6
2 | (Italy) M Gigante | 6 | 3 | 3

Second round
8 | (France) T Droguet | 3 | 6 | 6
WC | (France) M Malige | 6 | 2 | 3
Q | (Mexico) R Pacheco Méndez | 3 | 4
(Tunisia) M Echargui | 6 | 6
7 | (Estonia) M Lajal | 4 | 6 | 3
Alt | (Slovakia) A Molčan | 6 | 3 | 0^{r}
(France) H Grenier | 4 | 7^{7} | 6
Alt | (Lithuania) E Butvilas | 6 | 6^{3} | 4

Quarterfinals
8 | (France) T Droguet | 6^{3} | 2
(Tunisia) M Echargui | 7^{7} | 6
7 | (Estonia) M Lajal | 6 | 5 | 6
(France) H Grenier | 4 | 7 | 4

Semifinals
(Tunisia) M Echargui | 6^{4} | 6 | 6
7 | (Estonia) M Lajal | 7^{7} | 1 | 2
