= 2025 Saint-Tropez Open – Doubles =

Doubles
- 2025 Saint-Tropez Open

Final
- Champions: (United States) Trey Hilderbrand (United States) Mac Kiger
- Runners-up: (Finland) Patrik Niklas-Salminen (Czech Republic) Matěj Vocel
- Score: 7–6^{(7–5)}, 7–5

Events
Singles	Doubles
- Saint-Tropez Open

Sander Arends and Luke Johnson were the defending champions but chose not to defend their title.

Trey Hilderbrand and Mac Kiger won the title after defeating Patrik Niklas-Salminen and Matěj Vocel 7–6^{(7–5)}, 7–5 in the final.

== Seeds ==
1. (Germany) Hendrik Jebens / (France) Albano Olivetti (quarterfinals)
2. (India) Jeevan Nedunchezhiyan / (Switzerland) Jakub Paul (first round)
3. (United Kingdom) Joshua Paris / (United Kingdom) Marcus Willis (first round)
4. (Canada) Cleeve Harper / (United Kingdom) David Stevenson (first round)

== Draw ==
Key

- Q = Qualifier
- WC = Wild card
- LL = Lucky loser
- Alt = Alternate
- ITF = ITF entry
- PR = Protected ranking
- SR = Special ranking
- SE = Special exempt
- JE = Junior exempt
- JR = Junior Accelerator Programme entrant
- CO = College Accelerator Programme entrant
- NG = Next Gen Accelerator Program entrant
- w/o = Walkover
- r = Retired
- d = Defaulted

=== Draw ===
First round
1	(Germany) H Jebens (France) A Olivetti	7^{7}	3	[10]
(Sweden) E Grevelius (Sweden) A Heinonen	6^{4}	6	[7]
(France) G Barrère (France) T Droguet	6	6
(Romania) A Jecan (Romania) B Pavel	3	4
3	(United Kingdom) J Paris (United Kingdom) M Willis	6^{5}	2
(France) H Grenier (France) L Sanchez	7^{7}	6
(Finland) P Niklas-Salminen (Czech Republic) M Vocel	6	7^{8}
WC	(France) D Added (France) Maé Malige	4	6^{6}
(Spain) S Martos Gornés (Germany) T Rühl	2	2
WC	(France) Robin Catry (France) Étienne Donnet	6	6
(France) U Blanchet (France) K Jacquet	6	6
4	(Canada) C Harper (United Kingdom) D Stevenson	3	4
Alt	(France) R Bertrand (India) A Kalyanpur	7^{7}	4	[10]
(Estonia) M Lajal (Greece) Pe Tsitsipas	6^{4}	6	[5]
(United States) T Hilderbrand (United States) M Kiger	6	6
2	(India) J Nedunchezhiyan (Switzerland) J Paul	3	0

Quarterfinals
1	(Germany) H Jebens (France) A Olivetti	4	6^{9}
(France) G Barrère (France) T Droguet	6	7^{11}
(France) H Grenier (France) L Sanchez	3	4
(Finland) P Niklas-Salminen (Czech Republic) M Vocel	6	6
WC	(France) R Catry (France) É Donnet	6	4	[8]
(France) U Blanchet (France) K Jacquet	3	6	[10]
Alt	(France) R Bertrand (India) A Kalyanpur	2	4
(United States) T Hilderbrand (United States) M Kiger	6	6

Semifinals
(France) G Barrère (France) T Droguet	4	6	[4]
(Finland) P Niklas-Salminen (Czech Republic) M Vocel	6	3	[10]
(France) U Blanchet (France) K Jacquet	7^{7}	4	[9]
(United States) T Hilderbrand (United States) M Kiger	6^{3}	6	[11]

Final
(Finland) P Niklas-Salminen (Czech Republic) M Vocel	6^{5}	5
(United States) T Hilderbrand (United States) M Kiger	7^{7}	7
