= 2022 Saint-Tropez Open – Singles =

Singles
- 2022 Saint-Tropez Open

Final
- Champion: (Italy) Mattia Bellucci
- Runner-up: (Italy) Matteo Arnaldi
- Score: 6–3, 6–3

Events
Singles	Doubles
← 2021 ·	Saint-Tropez Open	· 2023 →

Benjamin Bonzi was the defending champion but chose not to defend his title.

Mattia Bellucci won the title after defeating Matteo Arnaldi 6–3, 6–3 in the final.

== Seeds ==
1. (France) Hugo Gaston (withdrew)
2. (France) Hugo Grenier (second round)
3. (France) Ugo Humbert (semifinals)
4. (Spain) Fernando Verdasco (second round)
5. (France) Grégoire Barrère (quarterfinals)
6. (United States) Jack Sock (first round, retired)
7. (Austria) Jurij Rodionov (semifinals)
8. (France) Geoffrey Blancaneaux (first round)
9. Alexander Shevchenko (first round)

== Draw ==
=== Key ===
- Q = Qualifier
- WC = Wild card
- LL = Lucky loser
- Alt = Alternate
- SE = Special exempt
- PR = Protected ranking
- ITF = ITF entry
- JE = Junior exempt
- w/o = Walkover
- r = Retired
- d = Defaulted
- SR = Special ranking

=== Finals ===
Semifinals
(Italy) Matteo Arnaldi	6	6
3	(France) Ugo Humbert	4	3
7	(Austria) Jurij Rodionov	6^{2}	6	2
Q	(Italy) Mattia Bellucci	7^{7}	2	6

Final
(Italy) Matteo Arnaldi	3	3
Q	(Italy) Mattia Bellucci	6	6

=== Top half ===
First round
9	A Shevchenko	1	2
(Italy) M Arnaldi	6	6
(France) H Mayot	6	6
Q	(Italy) F Gaio	4	4
(Czech Republic) L Rosol	6	7^{8}
(Switzerland) A Ritschard	4	6^{6}
WC	(France) L Van Assche	1	6^{8}
5	(France) G Barrère	6	7^{10}
3	(France) U Humbert	6	6
(France) L Lokoli	1	3
(Italy) S Travaglia	6	6^{6}	6
LL	(Bulgaria) A Andreev	4	7^{8}	4
WC	(France) Jurgen Briand	6	5	3
SE	(Dominican Republic) N Hardt	3	7	6
Q	(France) V Royer	7^{11}	6
8	(France) G Blancaneaux	6^{9}	3

Second round
(Italy) M Arnaldi	6	6
(France) H Mayot	2	3
(Czech Republic) L Rosol	3	5
5	(France) G Barrère	6	7
3	(France) U Humbert	6	5	6
(Italy) S Travaglia	4	7	3
SE	(Dominican Republic) N Hardt	3	4
Q	(France) V Royer	6	6

Quarterfinals
(Italy) M Arnaldi	6	6
5	(France) G Barrère	4	0
3	(France) U Humbert	6	6
Q	(France) V Royer	0	2

Semifinals
(Italy) M Arnaldi	6	6
3	(France) U Humbert	4	3

=== Bottom half ===
First round
7	(Austria) J Rodionov	6	7
(Kazakhstan) M Kukushkin	3	5
(Serbia) M Zekić	3	0
(Ukraine) O Krutykh	6	6
Q	(France) C Tabur	3	4
PR	(Italy) R Marcora	6	6
WC	(France) D Added	1	1
4	(Spain) F Verdasco	6	6
6	(United States) J Sock	4	4^{r}
Q	(Romania) ND Ionel	6	5
Q	(Italy) S Caruso	6	6^{5}	7^{7}
Alt	(Portugal) F Ferreira Silva	2	7^{7}	6^{3}
Alt	(Germany) L Wessels	4	6^{6}
Q	(Italy) M Bellucci	6	7^{8}
(Netherlands) J de Jong	7	2	4
2	(France) H Grenier	5	6	6

Second round
7	(Austria) J Rodionov	7^{7}	6
(Ukraine) O Krutykh	6^{5}	2
PR	(Italy) R Marcora	7^{8}	6
4	(Spain) F Verdasco	6^{6}	2
Q	(Romania) ND Ionel	6	0	6^{4}
Q	(Italy) S Caruso	3	6	7^{7}
Q	(Italy) M Bellucci	6	7^{7}
2	(France) H Grenier	4	6^{5}

Quarterfinals
7	(Austria) J Rodionov	6	6
PR	(Italy) R Marcora	4	3
Q	(Italy) S Caruso	3	1
Q	(Italy) M Bellucci	6	6

Semifinals
7	(Austria) J Rodionov	6^{2}	6	2
Q	(Italy) M Bellucci	7^{7}	2	6
