= 2023 Saint-Tropez Open =

- Date: 18 – 24 September
- Edition: 3rd
- Surface: Hard
- Location: Saint-Tropez, France

Champions

Singles
- (France) Constant Lestienne

Doubles
- (France) Dan Added / (France) Albano Olivetti
← 2022 ·	Saint-Tropez Open	· 2024 →

The 2023 Saint-Tropez Open was a professional tennis tournament played on hard courts. It was the third edition of the tournament which was part of the 2023 ATP Challenger Tour. It took place in Saint-Tropez, France between 18 and 24 September 2023.

== Singles main-draw entrants ==
=== Seeds ===
Country	Player	Rank^{1}	Seed
~~FRA~~	~~Ugo Humbert~~	~~36~~	~~1~~
AUT	Sebastian Ofner	59	2
FRA	Grégoire Barrère	62	3
FRA	Richard Gasquet	65	4
USA	Michael Mmoh	81	5
FRA	Hugo Gaston	87	6
~~BEL~~	~~David Goffin~~	~~100~~	~~7~~
~~FRA~~	~~Benjamin Bonzi~~	~~102~~	~~8~~
GBR	Liam Broady	104	9

- ^{1} Rankings are as of 11 September 2023.

=== Other entrants ===
The following players received wildcards into the singles main draw:

- (France) Ugo Blanchet
- (France) Arthur Géa
- (France) ~~Ugo Humbert~~

The following players received entry into the singles main draw as alternates:

- (Italy) Mattia Bellucci
- (France) Harold Mayot

The following players received entry from the qualifying draw:

- (France) Dan Added
- (Germany) Peter Gojowczyk
- (United Kingdom) Billy Harris
- (Ukraine) Oleksii Krutykh
- (Estonia) Mark Lajal
- (France) Jules Marie

The following players received entry as lucky losers:

- (France) Mathias Bourgue
- (Ivory Coast) Eliakim Coulibaly
- (Moldova) Alexander Cozbinov
- (France) Kyrian Jacquet

== Champions ==
=== Singles ===
- (France) Constant Lestienne def. (United Kingdom) Liam Broady 4–6, 6–3, 6–4.

=== Doubles ===
- (France) Dan Added / (France) Albano Olivetti def. (France) Jonathan Eysseric / (France) Harold Mayot 3–6, 1–0 ret.
