= 2022 Saint-Tropez Open =

- Date: 10 – 16 October
- Edition: 2nd
- Surface: Hard
- Location: Saint-Tropez, France

Champions

Singles
- (Italy) Mattia Bellucci

Doubles
- (France) Dan Added / (France) Albano Olivetti
← 2021 ·	Saint-Tropez Open	· 2023 →

The 2022 Saint-Tropez Open was a professional tennis tournament played on hard courts. It was the second edition of the tournament which was part of the 2022 ATP Challenger Tour. It took place in Saint-Tropez, France between 10 and 16 October 2022.

== Singles main-draw entrants ==
=== Seeds ===
Country	Player	Rank^{1}	Seed
~~FRA~~	~~Hugo Gaston~~	~~79~~	~~1~~
FRA	Hugo Grenier	101	2
FRA	Ugo Humbert	104	3
ESP	Fernando Verdasco	115	4
FRA	Grégoire Barrère	116	5
USA	Jack Sock	122	6
AUT	Jurij Rodionov	135	7
FRA	Geoffrey Blancaneaux	142	8
	Alexander Shevchenko	146	9

- ^{1} Rankings are as of 3 October 2022.

=== Other entrants ===
The following players received wildcards into the singles main draw:

- (France) Dan Added
- (France) Jurgen Briand
- (France) Luca Van Assche

The following player received entry into the singles main draw using a protected ranking:

- (Italy) Roberto Marcora

The following player received entry into the singles main draw as a special exempt:

- (Dominican Republic) Nick Hardt

The following players received entry into the singles main draw as alternates:

- (Portugal) Frederico Ferreira Silva
- (Germany) Louis Wessels

The following players received entry from the qualifying draw:

- (Italy) Mattia Bellucci
- (Italy) Salvatore Caruso
- (Italy) Federico Gaio
- (Romania) Nicholas David Ionel
- (France) Valentin Royer
- (France) Clément Tabur

The following player received entry as a lucky loser:

- (Bulgaria) Adrian Andreev

== Champions ==
=== Singles ===
- (Italy) Mattia Bellucci def. (Italy) Matteo Arnaldi 6–3, 6–3.

=== Doubles ===
- (France) Dan Added / (France) Albano Olivetti def. (Monaco) Romain Arneodo / (Austria) Tristan-Samuel Weissborn 6–3, 3–6, [12–10].
