= 2025 Saint-Tropez Open =

- Date: 15 – 21 September
- Edition: 5th
- Surface: Hard
- Location: Saint-Tropez, France

Champions

Singles
- (Tunisia) Moez Echargui

Doubles
- (United States) Trey Hilderbrand / (United States) Mac Kiger
← 2024 ·	Saint-Tropez Open	· 2026 →

The 2025 Saint-Tropez Open was a professional tennis tournament played on hardcourts. It was the fifth edition of the tournament which was part of the 2025 ATP Challenger Tour. It took place in Saint-Tropez, France between 15 and 21 September 2025.

== Singles main-draw entrants ==
=== Seeds ===
Country	Player	Rank^{1}	Seed
ESP	Martín Landaluce	138	1
ITA	Matteo Gigante	140	2
FRA	Pierre-Hugues Herbert	142	3
FRA	Ugo Blanchet	144	4
SUI	Stan Wawrinka	149	5
FRA	Harold Mayot	152	6
EST	Mark Lajal	156	7
FRA	Titouan Droguet	162	8

- ^{1} Rankings are as of 8 September 2025.

=== Other entrants ===
The following players received wildcards into the singles main draw:

- (France) Grégoire Barrère
- (France) Robin Bertrand
- (France) Maé Malige

The following player received entry into the singles main draw using a protected ranking:

- (United States) Michael Mmoh

The following players received entry into the singles main draw as alternates:

- (France) Dan Added
- (Lithuania) Edas Butvilas
- (Czech Republic) Marek Gengel
- (Slovakia) Norbert Gombos
- (Slovakia) Alex Molčan

The following players received entry from the qualifying draw:

- (France) Étienne Donnet
- (United States) Trey Hilderbrand
- (Mexico) Rodrigo Pacheco Méndez
- (France) Tom Paris
- (Italy) Luca Potenza
- Alexey Vatutin

The following players received entry as lucky losers:

- (France) Florent Bax
- (Belgium) Michael Geerts

== Champions ==
=== Singles ===
- (Tunisia) Moez Echargui def. (France) Dan Added 6–3, 6–4.

=== Doubles ===
- (United States) Trey Hilderbrand / (United States) Mac Kiger def. (Finland) Patrik Niklas-Salminen / (Czech Republic) Matěj Vocel 7–6^{(7–5)}, 7–5.
