= 2022 Saint-Tropez Open – Doubles =

Doubles
- 2022 Saint-Tropez Open

Final
- Champions: (France) Dan Added (France) Albano Olivetti
- Runners-up: (Monaco) Romain Arneodo (Austria) Tristan-Samuel Weissborn
- Score: 6–3, 3–6, [12–10]

Events
Singles	Doubles
← 2021 ·	Saint-Tropez Open	· 2023 →

Antonio Šančić and Artem Sitak were the defending champions but only Sitak chose to defend his title, partnering Sem Verbeek. Sitak lost in the first round to Dan Added and Albano Olivetti.

Added and Olivetti won the title after defeating Romain Arneodo and Tristan-Samuel Weissborn 6–3, 3–6, [12–10] in the final.

== Seeds ==
1. (Venezuela) Luis David Martínez / (Ukraine) Denys Molchanov (first round)
2. (Philippines) Treat Huey / (United States) Max Schnur (semifinals)
3. (Monaco) Romain Arneodo / (Austria) Tristan-Samuel Weissborn (final)
4. (France) Dan Added / (France) Albano Olivetti (champions)

== Draw ==
=== Key ===
- Q = Qualifier
- WC = Wild card
- LL = Lucky loser
- Alt = Alternate
- SE = Special exempt
- PR = Protected ranking
- ITF = ITF entry
- JE = Junior exempt
- w/o = Walkover
- r = Retired
- d = Defaulted
- SR = Special ranking

First round
1	(Venezuela) LD Martínez (Ukraine) D Molchanov	1	5
(France) T Arribagé (France) C Tabur	6	7
(France) J Eysseric (Croatia) F Škugor	6^{5}	6	[8]
WC	(France) A Fils (France) H Mayot	7^{7}	2	[10]
4	(France) D Added (France) A Olivetti	7	6
(New Zealand) A Sitak (Netherlands) S Verbeek	5	3
(Czech Republic) L Rosol (Italy) S Travaglia	2	4
WC	(France) Jurgen Briand (France) V Royer	6	6
(France) G Blancaneaux (Switzerland) L Margaroli	4	6	[10]
Yan Bondarevskiy; A Shevchenko	6	4	[3]
(Italy) M Bortolotti (United Kingdom) L Johnson	1	3
3	(Monaco) R Arneodo (Austria) T-S Weissborn	6	6
(Netherlands) J de Jong (Netherlands) B Stevens	6	6
(Ukraine) O Krutykh (Kazakhstan) G Lomakin	1	2
(France) G Barrère (France) U Blanchet	2	3
2	(Philippines) T Huey (United States) M Schnur	6	6

Quarterfinals
(France) T Arribagé (France) C Tabur	7^{7}	6
WC	(France) A Fils (France) H Mayot	6^{2}	3
4	(France) D Added (France) A Olivetti	6	6
WC	(France) J Briand (France) V Royer	4	4
(France) G Blancaneaux (Switzerland) L Margaroli	3	2
3	(Monaco) R Arneodo (Austria) T-S Weissborn	6	6
(Netherlands) J de Jong (Netherlands) B Stevens	6	5	[9]
2	(Philippines) T Huey (United States) M Schnur	3	7	[11]

Semifinals
(France) T Arribagé (France) C Tabur	7	5	[12]
4	(France) D Added (France) A Olivetti	5	7	[14]
3	(Monaco) R Arneodo (Austria) T-S Weissborn	7^{11}	7^{8}
2	(Philippines) T Huey (United States) M Schnur	6^{9}	6^{6}

Final
4	(France) D Added (France) A Olivetti	6	3	[12]
3	(Monaco) R Arneodo (Austria) T-S Weissborn	3	6	[10]
