= 2023 Saint-Tropez Open – Doubles =

Doubles
- 2023 Saint-Tropez Open

Final
- Champions: (France) Dan Added (France) Albano Olivetti
- Runners-up: (France) Jonathan Eysseric (France) Harold Mayot
- Score: 3–6, 1–0 ret.

Events
Singles	Doubles
← 2022 ·	Saint-Tropez Open	· 2024 →

Dan Added and Albano Olivetti were the defending champions and successfully defended their title after Jonathan Eysseric and Harold Mayot retired in the final leading 6–3, 0–1.

== Seeds ==
1. (United Kingdom) Lloyd Glasspool / (Finland) Harri Heliövaara (semifinals)
2. (Monaco) Romain Arneodo / (Austria) Sam Weissborn (semifinals)
3. (Serbia) Nikola Ćaćić / (Romania) Victor Vlad Cornea (first round)
4. (France) Dan Added / (France) Albano Olivetti (champions)

== Draw ==
=== Key ===
- Q = Qualifier
- WC = Wild card
- LL = Lucky loser
- Alt = Alternate
- SE = Special exempt
- PR = Protected ranking
- ITF = ITF entry
- JE = Junior exempt
- w/o = Walkover
- r = Retired
- d = Defaulted
- SR = Special ranking

First round
1	(United Kingdom) L Glasspool (Finland) H Heliövaara	6	6
(India) J Nedunchezhiyan (India) P Raja	2	2
(Italy) M Bellucci (Italy) L Nardi	4	4
(Spain) S Martos Gornés (Netherlands) S Verbeek	6	6
3	(Serbia) N Ćaćić (Romania) VV Cornea	3	6^{3}
(France) J Eysseric (France) H Mayot	6	7^{7}
(Netherlands) G Brouwer (Netherlands) J de Jong	4	6	[10]
(Netherlands) S Arends (Netherlands) D Pel	6	4	[4]
WC	(France) U Blanchet (France) K Jacquet	7^{7}	6
(France) G Barrère (France) M Bourgue	6^{4}	2
(France) A Escoffier (United Kingdom) J Paris	1	6	[7]
4	(France) D Added (France) A Olivetti	6	3	[10]
(United Kingdom) S Duncan (Ukraine) V Uzhylovskyi	6	4	[9]
WC	(France) Maé Malige (France) T Paris	2	6	[11]
(United Kingdom) L Johnson (United Kingdom) H Patten	4	7^{7}	[6]
2	(Monaco) R Arneodo (Austria) S Weissborn	6	6^{5}	[10]

Quarterfinals
1	(United Kingdom) L Glasspool (Finland) H Heliövaara	7^{7}	7^{7}
(Spain) S Martos Gornés (Netherlands) S Verbeek	6^{5}	6^{0}
(France) J Eysseric (France) H Mayot	4	6	[10]
(Netherlands) G Brouwer (Netherlands) J de Jong	6	4	[7]
WC	(France) U Blanchet (France) K Jacquet	2	4
4	(France) D Added (France) A Olivetti	6	6
WC	(France) M Malige (France) T Paris	5	0
2	(Monaco) R Arneodo (Austria) S Weissborn	7	6

Semifinals
1	(United Kingdom) L Glasspool (Finland) H Heliövaara	6^{2}	4
(France) J Eysseric (France) H Mayot	7^{7}	6
4	(France) D Added (France) A Olivetti	6	7
2	(Monaco) R Arneodo (Austria) S Weissborn	3	5

Final
(France) J Eysseric (France) H Mayot	6	0^{r}
4	(France) D Added (France) A Olivetti	3	1
