= 2021 Saint-Tropez Open =

- Date: 30 August – 5 September
- Edition: 1st
- Surface: Hard
- Location: Saint-Tropez, France

Champions

Singles
- (France) Benjamin Bonzi

Doubles
- (Croatia) Antonio Šančić / (New Zealand) Artem Sitak
Saint-Tropez Open	· 2022 →

The 2021 Saint-Tropez Open was a professional tennis tournament played on hard courts. It was the first edition of the tournament which was part of the 2021 ATP Challenger Tour. It took place in Saint-Tropez, France between 30 August and 5 September 2021.

== Singles main-draw entrants ==
=== Seeds ===
Country	Player	Rank^{1}	Seed
FRA	Benjamin Bonzi	94	1
AUS	Christopher O'Connell	126	2
FRA	Grégoire Barrère	136	3
IND	Prajnesh Gunneswaran	156	4
RUS	Roman Safiullin	164	5
SWE	Elias Ymer	169	6
TUR	Altuğ Çelikbilek	174	7
AUS	Thanasi Kokkinakis	186	8

- ^{1} Rankings are as of 23 August 2021.

=== Other entrants ===
The following players received wildcards into the singles main draw:

- (France) Arthur Cazaux
- (France) Valentin Royer
- (France) Luca Van Assche

The following players received entry into the singles main draw as alternates:

- (United States) JC Aragone
- (France) Manuel Guinard
- (France) Kyrian Jacquet
- (France) Constant Lestienne
- (Chinese Taipei) ~~Wu Tung-lin~~

The following players received entry from the qualifying draw:

- (France) Dan Added
- (Russia) Bogdan Bobrov
- (France) Jurgen Briand
- (Canada) Alexis Galarneau

The following players received entry as lucky losers:

- (Estonia) Daniil Glinka
- (France) Maxime Hamou
- (Sweden) Dragoș Nicolae Mădăraș

== Champions ==
=== Singles ===
- (France) Benjamin Bonzi def. (Australia) Christopher O'Connell 6–7^{(10–12)}, 6–1, 0–0 ret.

=== Doubles ===
- (Croatia) Antonio Šančić / (New Zealand) Artem Sitak def. (Monaco) Romain Arneodo / (France) Manuel Guinard 7–6^{(7–5)}, 6–4.
