= 2026 Saint-Tropez Open – Singles =

Singles
- 2026 Saint-Tropez Open

Final
- Champion: (France) Titouan Droguet
- Runner-up: (France) Harold Mayot
- Score: 6–3, 7–5

Events
Singles	Doubles
- Saint-Tropez Open

Moez Echargui was the defending champion but lost in the first round to Daniel Masur.

Titouan Droguet won the title after defeating Harold Mayot 6–3, 7–5 in the final.

== Seeds ==
1. (France) Titouan Droguet (champion)
2. (United Kingdom) Toby Samuel (withdrew)
3. (Netherlands) Jesper de Jong (quarterfinals)
4. (Croatia) Dino Prižmić (semifinals)
5. (Colombia) Nicolás Mejía (first round, retired)
6. (Bulgaria) Grigor Dimitrov (first round)
7. (Estonia) Mark Lajal (quarterfinals)
8. (Norway) Nicolai Budkov Kjær (first round)

== Draw ==
Key

- Q = Qualifier
- WC = Wild card
- LL = Lucky loser
- Alt = Alternate
- ITF = ITF entry
- PR = Protected ranking
- SR = Special ranking
- SE = Special exempt
- JE = Junior exempt
- JR = Junior Accelerator Programme entrant
- CO = College Accelerator Programme entrant
- NG = Next Gen Accelerator Program entrant
- w/o = Walkover
- r = Retired
- d = Defaulted

=== Finals ===
Semifinals
1	(France) Titouan Droguet	6	5	6
4	(Croatia) Dino Prižmić	3	7	2
SE	(France) Harold Mayot	5	6	4
Q	(United States) Murphy Cassone	7	2	2^{r}

Final
1	(France) Titouan Droguet	6	7
SE	(France) Harold Mayot	3	5

=== Top half ===
First round
1	(France) T Droguet	6^{6}	6	7^{7}
LL	(United States) K Poling	7^{8}	4	6^{4}
LL	(Ukraine) Vadym Ursu	5	3
(Croatia) B Gojo	7	6
Q	(France) H Grenier	4	4
WC	(France) T Faurel	6	6
WC	(Belgium) D Goffin	3	4
7	(Estonia) M Lajal	6	6
4	(Croatia) D Prižmić	6	6
(Spain) D Rincón	4	3
(Spain) D Jordà Sanchis	6	6
(United Kingdom) H Wendelken	2	4
(Estonia) D Glinka	6	7
Q	(France) Daniel Jade	3	5
(France) U Blanchet	4
5	(Colombia) N Mejía	1^{r}

Second round
1	(France) T Droguet	3	6	6
(Croatia) B Gojo	6	3	4
WC	(France) T Faurel	1	2
7	(Estonia) M Lajal	6	6
4	(Croatia) D Prižmić	6	7^{7}
(Spain) D Jordà Sanchis	1	6^{5}
(Estonia) D Glinka	6	3	6
(France) U Blanchet	4	6	4

Quarterfinals
1	(France) T Droguet	6	7^{7}
7	(Estonia) M Lajal	4	6^{1}
4	(Croatia) D Prižmić	7^{7}	7
(Estonia) D Glinka	6^{4}	5

Semifinals
1	(France) T Droguet	6	5	6
4	(Croatia) D Prižmić	3	7	2

=== Bottom half ===
First round
6/WC	(Bulgaria) G Dimitrov	6^{3}	3
(Lithuania) E Butvilas	7^{7}	6
SE	(France) H Mayot	6	2	7^{7}
LL	(Canada) J Boulais	4	6	6^{2}
(Italy) A Guerrieri	6	6^{4}	6
(Italy) F Maestrelli	3	7^{7}	3
(Switzerland) R Bertola	6^{5}	6^{5}
3	(Netherlands) J de Jong	7^{7}	7^{7}
8	(Norway) N Budkov Kjær	6	3	5
(United Kingdom) B Harris	3	6	7
Q	(United States) M Cassone	7^{8}	4	6
(France) C Tabur	6^{6}	6	3
Q	(France) M Martineau	7^{7}	6^{6}	7^{8}
(Australia) T Schoolkate	6^{4}	7^{8}	6^{6}
Q	(Tunisia) M Echargui	1	6	4
Q	(Germany) D Masur	6	4	6

Second round
(Lithuania) E Butvilas	4	3
SE	(France) H Mayot	6	6
(Italy) A Guerrieri	6	6^{8}	6^{2}
3	(Netherlands) J de Jong	3	7^{10}	7^{7}
(United Kingdom) B Harris	6^{3}	4
Q	(United States) M Cassone	7^{7}	6
Q	(France) M Martineau	3	7	3
Q	(Germany) D Masur	6	5	6

Quarterfinals
SE	(France) H Mayot	6	4	7
3	(Netherlands) J de Jong	3	6	5
Q	(United States) M Cassone	6^{4}	7^{14}	6
Q	(Germany) D Masur	7^{7}	6^{12}	4

Semifinals
SE	(France) H Mayot	5	6	4
Q	(United States) M Cassone	7	2	2^{r}
