= 2026 Saint-Tropez Open – Doubles =

Doubles
- 2026 Saint-Tropez Open

Final
- Champions: (Switzerland) Jakub Paul (Czech Republic) Matěj Vocel
- Runners-up: (France) Constantin Bittoun Kouzmine (Germany) Daniel Masur
- Score: 6–4, 6–3

Events
Singles	Doubles
- Saint-Tropez Open

Trey Hilderbrand and Mac Kiger were the defending champions but chose not to defend their title.

Jakub Paul and Matěj Vocel won the title after defeating Constantin Bittoun Kouzmine and Daniel Masur 6–4, 6–3 in the final.

== Seeds ==
1. (France) Arthur Reymond / (France) Luca Sanchez (quarterfinals)
2. (Switzerland) Jakub Paul / (Czech Republic) Matěj Vocel (champions)
3. (Bulgaria) Alexander Donski / (Poland) Filip Pieczonka (quarterfinals)
4. (Monaco) Romain Arneodo / (United States) Benjamin Kittay (semifinals)

== Draw ==
Key

- Q = Qualifier
- WC = Wild card
- LL = Lucky loser
- Alt = Alternate
- ITF = ITF entry
- PR = Protected ranking
- SR = Special ranking
- SE = Special exempt
- JE = Junior exempt
- JR = Junior Accelerator Programme entrant
- CO = College Accelerator Programme entrant
- NG = Next Gen Accelerator Program entrant
- w/o = Walkover
- r = Retired
- d = Defaulted

First round
1	(France) A Reymond (France) L Sanchez	6	1	[10]
(United States) K Poling (United States) J Sheehy	3	6	[6]
(Uruguay) A Behar (United Kingdom) J Paris	3	6	[6]
(France) C Bittoun Kouzmine (Germany) D Masur	6	2	[10]
4	(Monaco) R Arneodo (United States) B Kittay	6	6
(India) VS Prashanth (India) R Ramanathan	2	3
(Sweden) E Grevelius (Sweden) A Heinonen	6	6
WC	(France) Yanis Ghazouani Durand (France) Mathieu Scaglia	4	4
(Israel) D Cukierman (Brazil) F Romboli	7	6
(Czech Republic) F Duda (Serbia) S Latinović	5	4
(Colombia) N Barrientos (Netherlands) J Jans	6^{3}	3
3	(Bulgaria) A Donski (Poland) F Pieczonka	7^{7}	6
WC	(France) Hugo Car (France) Guillaume Dalmasso	6	4	[7]
(United Kingdom) B Harris (Spain) D Jordà Sanchis	4	6	[10]
(United Kingdom) T Hands (United Kingdom) M Summers	4	6	[3]
2	(Switzerland) J Paul (Czech Republic) M Vocel	6	3	[10]

Quarterfinals
1	(France) A Reymond (France) L Sanchez	6^{3}	6	[9]
(France) C Bittoun Kouzmine (Germany) D Masur	7^{7}	2	[11]
4	(Monaco) R Arneodo (United States) B Kittay	6	7^{7}
(Sweden) E Grevelius (Sweden) A Heinonen	1	6^{5}
(Israel) D Cukierman (Brazil) F Romboli	7^{8}	6^{2}	[10]
3	(Bulgaria) A Donski (Poland) F Pieczonka	6^{6}	7^{7}	[7]
(United Kingdom) B Harris (Spain) D Jordà Sanchis	5	4
2	(Switzerland) J Paul (Czech Republic) M Vocel	7	6

Semifinals
(France) C Bittoun Kouzmine (Germany) D Masur	7^{7}	6
4	(Monaco) R Arneodo (United States) B Kittay	6^{3}	3
(Israel) D Cukierman (Brazil) F Romboli	6^{5}	6^{4}
2	(Switzerland) J Paul (Czech Republic) M Vocel	7^{7}	7^{7}

Final
(France) C Bittoun Kouzmine (Germany) D Masur	4	3
2	(Switzerland) J Paul (Czech Republic) M Vocel	6	6
