= 2024 Saint-Tropez Open – Singles =

Singles
- 2024 Saint-Tropez Open

Final
- Champion: (Netherlands) Gijs Brouwer
- Runner-up: (France) Lucas Pouille
- Score: 6–4, 7–6^{(7–2)}

Events
Singles	Doubles
- Saint-Tropez Open

Constant Lestienne was the defending champion but lost in the second round to Titouan Droguet.

Gijs Brouwer won the title after defeating Lucas Pouille 6–4, 7–6^{(7–2)} in the final.

== Seeds ==
1. (Croatia) Duje Ajduković (quarterfinals)
2. (France) Constant Lestienne (second round)
3. (France) Luca Van Assche (first round)
4. (France) Richard Gasquet (second round)
5. (France) Harold Mayot (second round)
6. (France) Pierre-Hugues Herbert (first round)
7. (France) Lucas Pouille (final)
8. (France) Ugo Blanchet (semifinals)

== Draw ==
Key

- Q = Qualifier
- WC = Wild card
- LL = Lucky loser
- Alt = Alternate
- ITF = ITF entry
- PR = Protected ranking
- SR = Special ranking
- SE = Special exempt
- JE = Junior exempt
- JR = Junior Accelerator Programme entrant
- CO = College Accelerator Programme entrant
- NG = Next Gen Accelerator Program entrant
- w/o = Walkover
- r = Retired
- d = Defaulted

=== Finals ===
Semifinals
7	(France) Lucas Pouille	6	7
(Poland) Kamil Majchrzak	4	5
Q	(Netherlands) Gijs Brouwer	6	7
8	(France) Ugo Blanchet	4	5

Final
7	(France) Lucas Pouille	4	6^{2}
Q	(Netherlands) Gijs Brouwer	6	7^{7}

=== Top half ===
First round
1	(Croatia) D Ajduković	6	2
WC	(France) K Jacquet	4	1^{r}
Alt	(United States) M Damm	6	6
LL	(France) Alexis Gautier	2	2
LL	(United Kingdom) L Broady	6^{8}	6	7
Q	(United Kingdom) C Broom	7^{10}	2	5
Q	(France) Louis Tessa	0	3
7	(France) L Pouille	6	6
4	(France) R Gasquet	6	6
(Lebanon) B Hassan	1	3
(France) H Grenier	5	6^{4}
(France) M Martineau	7	7^{7}
(Poland) K Majchrzak	6^{2}	6	6
Alt	(Croatia) B Gojo	7^{7}	4	3
Q	(France) L Poullain	1	4
5	(France) H Mayot	6	6

Second round
1	(Croatia) D Ajduković	6	6
Alt	(United States) M Damm	4	0
LL	(United Kingdom) L Broady	3	2
7	(France) L Pouille	6	6
4	(France) R Gasquet	4	6^{6}
(France) M Martineau	6	7^{8}
(Poland) K Majchrzak	6	6
5	(France) H Mayot	3	4

Quarterfinals
1	(Croatia) D Ajduković	2	6^{5}
7	(France) L Pouille	6	7^{7}
(France) M Martineau	3	4
(Poland) K Majchrzak	6	6

Semifinals
7	(France) L Pouille	6	7
(Poland) K Majchrzak	4	5

=== Bottom half ===
First round
6	(France) P-H Herbert	6^{4}	6^{5}
(France) B Bonzi	7^{7}	7^{7}
Q	(Czech Republic) J Veselý	7^{11}	6
(Italy) M Gigante	6^{9}	3
WC	(Switzerland) A Bellier	4	2
(Spain) M Landaluce	6	6
Q	(Netherlands) G Brouwer	6	6
3	(France) L Van Assche	3	2
8	(France) U Blanchet	7^{9}	4	6
Alt	(France) M Janvier	6^{7}	6	3
(Belgium) A Blockx	6^{4}	6	6
(Poland) M Kaśnikowski	7^{7}	3	4
Q	(Ivory Coast) E Coulibaly	3	7^{9}	4
(France) T Droguet	6	6^{7}	6
WC	(France) R Bertrand	2	0
2	(France) C Lestienne	6	6

Second round
(France) B Bonzi	7^{7}	0
Q	(Czech Republic) J Veselý	6^{4}	0^{r}
(Spain) M Landaluce	5	0
Q	(Netherlands) G Brouwer	7	6
8	(France) U Blanchet	6	6
(Belgium) A Blockx	3	4
(France) T Droguet	7^{7}	6
2	(France) C Lestienne	6^{4}	4

Quarterfinals
(France) B Bonzi	6	3	5
Q	(Netherlands) G Brouwer	4	6	7
8	(France) U Blanchet	6	6
(France) T Droguet	1	4

Semifinals
Q	(Netherlands) G Brouwer	6	7
8	(France) U Blanchet	4	5
