= 2026 Saint-Tropez Open =

- Date: 21 – 27 September
- Edition: 6th
- Surface: Hard
- Location: Saint-Tropez, France

Champions

Singles
- (France) Titouan Droguet

Doubles
- (Switzerland) Jakub Paul / (Czech Republic) Matěj Vocel
- Saint-Tropez Open

The 2026 Saint-Tropez Open was a professional tennis tournament played on hardcourts. It was the sixth edition of the tournament which was part of the 2026 ATP Challenger Tour. It took place in Saint-Tropez, France between 21 and 27 September 2026.

== Singles main-draw entrants ==
=== Seeds ===
Country	Player	Rank^{1}	Seed
FRA	Titouan Droguet	89	1
~~GBR~~	~~Toby Samuel~~	~~95~~	~~2~~
NED	Jesper de Jong	98	3
CRO	Dino Prižmić	103	4
COL	Nicolás Mejía	121	5
BUL	Grigor Dimitrov	128	6
EST	Mark Lajal	140	7
NOR	Nicolai Budkov Kjær	147	8

- ^{1} Rankings are as of 14 September 2026.

=== Other entrants ===
The following players received wildcards into the singles main draw:

- (Bulgaria) Grigor Dimitrov
- (France) Thomas Faurel
- (Belgium) David Goffin

The following players received entry into the singles main draw as special exempts:

- (France) ~~Sascha Gueymard Wayenburg~~
- (France) Harold Mayot

The following players received entry from the qualifying draw:

- (United States) Murphy Cassone
- (Tunisia) Moez Echargui
- (France) Hugo Grenier
- (France) Daniel Jade
- (France) Matteo Martineau
- (Germany) Daniel Masur

The following players received entry as lucky losers:

- (Canada) Justin Boulais
- (United States) Karl Poling
- (Ukraine) Vadym Ursu

== Champions ==
=== Singles ===
- (France) Titouan Droguet def. (France) Harold Mayot 6–3, 7–5.

=== Doubles ===
- (Switzerland) Jakub Paul / (Czech Republic) Matěj Vocel def. (France) Constantin Bittoun Kouzmine / (Germany) Daniel Masur 6–4, 6–3.
