= Matěj Vocel =

Czech tennis player (born 1997)

- Country (sports): Czech Republic
- Born: 20 May 1997 (age 29) Prague, Czech Republic
- Height: 1.88 m (6 ft 2 in)
- Plays: Right-handed (two-handed backhand)
- College: Oklahoma State; Ohio State
- Prize money: US $294,264

Singles
- Career record: 0–0 (at ATP Tour level, Grand Slam level, and in Davis Cup)
- Career titles: 0
- Highest ranking: No. 641 (24 December 2018)

Doubles
- Career record: 10–14 (at ATP Tour level, Grand Slam level, and in Davis Cup)
- Career titles: 6 Challenger, 17 ITF
- Highest ranking: No. 57 (24 August 2026)
- Current ranking: No. 69 (16 November 2026)

Grand Slam doubles results
- Australian Open: 1R (2026)
- French Open: 2R (2026)
- Wimbledon: 1R (2026)
- US Open: QF (2025)
- Last updated on: 16 November 2026.

Matěj Vocel (born 20 May 1997) is a Czech tennis player. Vocel has a career high ATP singles ranking of No. 641 achieved on 24 December 2018 and a career high ATP doubles ranking of No. 57 achieved on 24 August 2026.

Vocel played college tennis at Oklahoma State before transferring to Ohio State.

== Career ==
Vocel won his first ATP Challenger doubles title at the 2025 Advantage Cars Prague Open.

Vocel made his ATP debut at the 2025 US Open in doubles with Tomáš Macháč and they reached the quarterfinal, defeating second seeds Mate Pavić and Marcelo Arévalo in the second round.

Vocel reached his maiden ATP semifinal at the 2026 Brisbane International partnering Tomáš Macháč again.

== ATP Challenger Tour finals ==
Result	W–L	Date	Tournament	Category	Surface	Partner	Opponents	Score
Loss	0–1	Jun 2016	Prague, Czech Republic	Challenger	Clay	(Czech Republic) Zdeněk Kolář	(Poland) Tomasz Bednarek (Croatia) Nikola Mektić	4–6, 7–5, [7–10]
Loss	0–2	Oct 2024	Roanne, France	Challenger	Hard (i)	(Switzerland) Jakub Paul	(Netherlands) David Pel (Colombia) Nicolás Barrientos	6–4, 3–6, [6–10]
Loss	0–3	Oct 2024	Saint-Brieuc, France	Challenger	Hard (i)	(Switzerland) Jakub Paul	(France) Gabriel Debru (France) Geoffrey Blancaneaux	3–3, def.
Loss	0–4	Oct 2024	Brest, France	Challenger	Hard (i)	(Switzerland) Jakub Paul	(Tunisia) Skander Mansouri (Colombia) Nicolás Barrientos	5–7, 6–4, [5–10]
Win	1–4	May 2025	Prague, Czech Republic	Challenger	Clay	(Ukraine) Denys Molchanov	(Austria) David Pichler (Austria) Jurij Rodionov	7–6^{(7–3)}, 6–3
Win	2–4	Jun 2025	Bratislava, Slovakia	Challenger	Clay	(Czech Republic) Andrew Paulson	(Czech Republic) Jiří Barnát (Czech Republic) Filip Duda	6–1, 6–4
Win	3–4	Jul 2025	Trieste, Italy	Challenger	Clay	(Switzerland) Jakub Paul	(Netherlands) Robin Haase (Denmark) Johannes Ingildsen	7–5, 6–1
Win	4–4	Sep 2025	Rennes, France	Challenger	Hard (i)	(Finland) Patrik Niklas-Salminen	(Germany) Hendrik Jebens (France) Albano Olivetti	6–3, 6–3
Loss	4–5	Sep 2025	Saint-Tropez, France	Challenger	Hard (i)	(Finland) Patrik Niklas-Salminen	(United States) Mac Kiger (United States) Trey Hilderbrand	6–7^{(5–7)}, 5–7
Loss	4–6	Feb 2026	Pau, France	Challenger	Hard (i)	(Switzerland) Jakub Paul	(India) Sriram Balaji (Austria) Neil Oberleitner	6–1, 3–6, [11–13]
Loss	4–7	Feb 2026	Lille, France	Challenger	Hard (i)	(Switzerland) Jakub Paul	Ivan Liutarevich (Poland) Filip Pieczonka	4–6, 6–3, [8–10]
Win	5–7	Feb 2026	Saint-Brieuc, France	Challenger	Hard (i)	(Switzerland) Jakub Paul	(France) Arthur Reymond (France) Luca Sanchez	6–7^{(4–7)}, 7–6^{(7–2)}, [10–5]
Win	6–7	Mar 2026	Naples, Italy	Challenger	Clay	(Switzerland) Jakub Paul	(Germany) Tim Rühl (Netherlands) Mick Veldheer	6–2, 6–4
Loss	6–8	Apr 2026	Monza, Italy	Challenger	Clay	(Switzerland) Jakub Paul	(Belgium) Sander Gillé (Netherlands) Sem Verbeek	6–4, 6–7^{(3–7)}, [8–10]
Win	7–8	Sep 2026	Saint-Tropez, France	Challenger	Hard	(Switzerland) Jakub Paul	(France) Constantin Bittoun Kouzmine (Germany) Daniel Masur	6–4, 6–3
Win	8–8	Nov 2026	Orléans, France	Challenger	Hard (i)	(Switzerland) Jakub Paul	Ivan Liutarevich (Poland) Filip Pieczonka	7–6^{(7–4)}, 7–6^{(7–5)}
