= 2024 Saint-Tropez Open =

- Date: 16 – 22 September
- Edition: 4th
- Surface: Hard
- Location: Saint-Tropez, France

Champions

Singles
- (Netherlands) Gijs Brouwer

Doubles
- (Netherlands) Sander Arends / (United Kingdom) Luke Johnson
- Saint-Tropez Open

The 2024 Saint-Tropez Open was a professional tennis tournament played on hard courts. It was the fourth edition of the tournament which was part of the 2024 ATP Challenger Tour. It took place in Saint-Tropez, France between 16 and 22 September 2024.

== Singles main-draw entrants ==
=== Seeds ===
Country	Player	Rank^{1}	Seed
CRO	Duje Ajduković	105	1
FRA	Constant Lestienne	109	2
FRA	Luca Van Assche	111	3
FRA	Richard Gasquet	119	4
FRA	Harold Mayot	127	5
FRA	Pierre-Hugues Herbert	129	6
FRA	Lucas Pouille	140	7
FRA	Ugo Blanchet	145	8

- ^{1} Rankings are as of 9 September 2024.

=== Other entrants ===
The following players received wildcards into the singles main draw:

- (Switzerland) Antoine Bellier
- (France) Robin Bertrand
- (France) Kyrian Jacquet

The following players received entry into the singles main draw as alternates:

- (United States) Martin Damm
- (France) ~~Antoine Escoffier~~
- (Croatia) Borna Gojo
- (France) Maxime Janvier

The following players received entry from the qualifying draw:

- (United Kingdom) Charles Broom
- (Netherlands) Gijs Brouwer
- (Ivory Coast) Eliakim Coulibaly
- (France) Lucas Poullain
- (France) Louis Tessa
- (Czech Republic) Jiří Veselý

The following players received entry as lucky losers:

- (United Kingdom) Liam Broady
- (France) Alexis Gautier

== Champions ==
=== Singles ===
- (Netherlands) Gijs Brouwer def. (France) Lucas Pouille 6–4, 7–6^{(7–2)}.

=== Doubles ===
- (Netherlands) Sander Arends / (United Kingdom) Luke Johnson def. (Sweden) André Göransson / (Netherlands) Sem Verbeek 3–6, 6–3, [10–4].
