= Albano Olivetti =

French tennis player (born 1991)

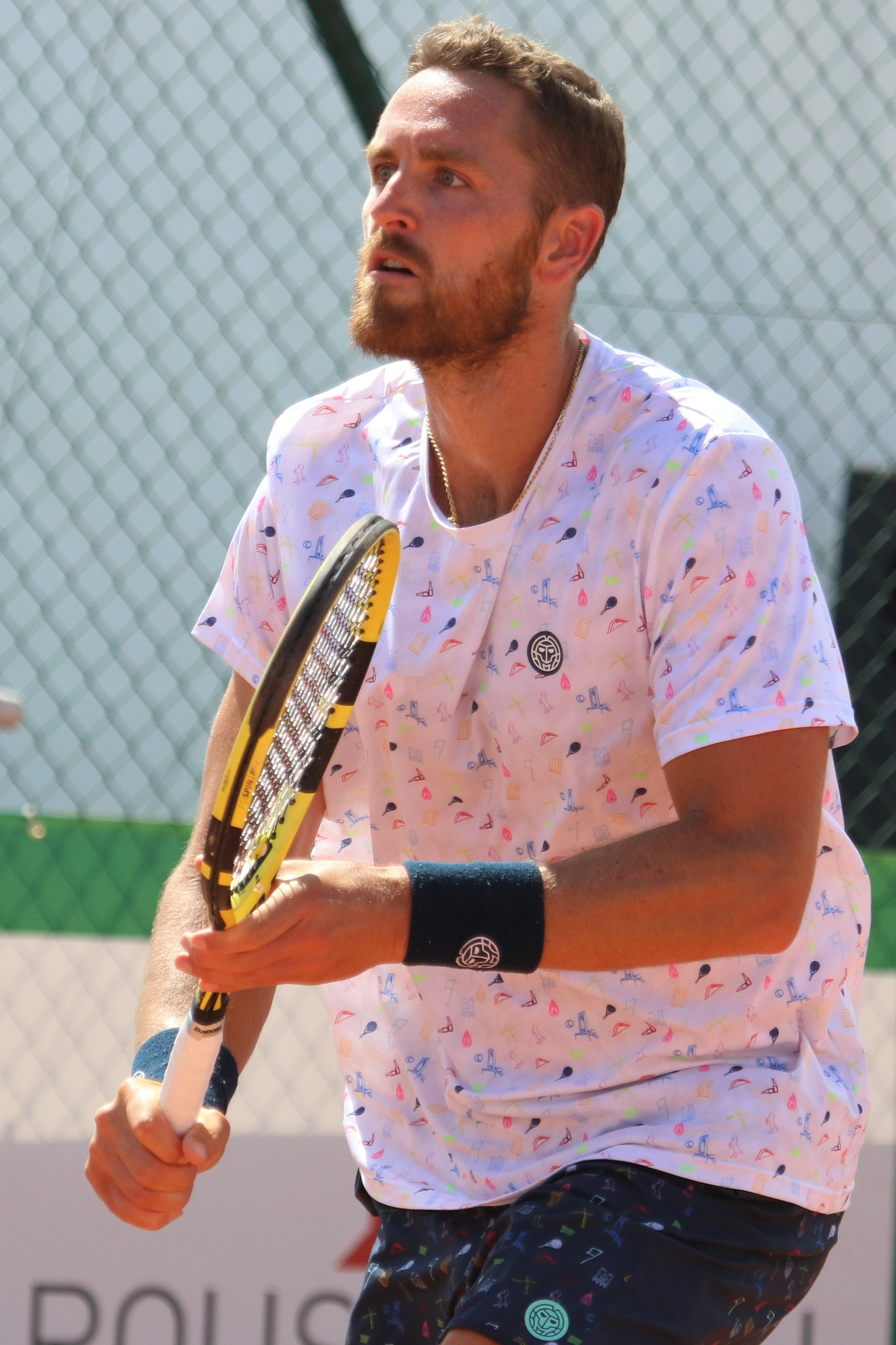
- Olivetti at the 2022 Internationaux de Blois
- Country (sports): France
- Born: 24 November 1991 (age 34) Haguenau, France
- Height: 2.03 m (6 ft 8 in)
- Turned pro: 2010
- Plays: Right-handed (one-handed backhand)
- Prize money: US $2,041,339

Singles
- Career record: 5–9
- Career titles: 0
- Highest ranking: No. 161 (26 May 2014)

Grand Slam singles results
- Australian Open: Q1 (2014)
- French Open: 1R (2014)
- Wimbledon: 1R (2016)
- US Open: 1R (2013)

Doubles
- Career record: 131–102
- Career titles: 10
- Highest ranking: No. 12 (23 November 2026)
- Current ranking: No. 12 (23 November 2026)

Grand Slam doubles results
- Australian Open: 2R (2024, 2026)
- French Open: 2R (2011, 2016, 2022, 2025)
- Wimbledon: 2R (2024, 2025, 2026)
- US Open: QF (2023)

Other doubles tournaments
- Tour Finals: W (2026)

Grand Slam mixed doubles results
- French Open: 2R (2023)
- Wimbledon: 1R (2026)
- Last updated on: 22 November 2026.

Albano Olivetti (born 24 November 1991) is a French professional tennis player who specializes in doubles. He has a career-high ATP doubles ranking of world No. 12 achieved on 23 November 2026 and a singles ranking of No. 161 achieved on 26 May 2014. He has won 10 ATP Tour doubles titles, including eight with Théo Arribagé.

Although not officially recognised by the ATP, he is notable for hitting the second fastest serve on tennis historical stats – at 160 mph or 257.5 km/h during the first round of the 2012 Internazionali di Bergamo, Italy.

== Career ==
=== 2012: ATP singles debut ===
Olivetti qualified for the main draw of an ATP event for the first time in his career in Marseille, coming through qualifying and shocking World No. 8 Mardy Fish on his way to reaching the quarterfinals, where he lost to Michaël Llodra in two close sets.

=== 2021–2022: ATP final, Top 100 in doubles ===
Olivetti reached the top 100 in the doubles rankings at World No. 97 on 25 April 2022.

=== 2023: Second ATP final, Major quarterfinal, top 50 ===
At the 2023 Open Sud de France, the French reached his second final in doubles partnering American Maxime Cressy as a wildcard pair defeating second seeded pair of Santiago González / Édouard Roger-Vasselin and Sander Arends / David Pel en route.

He reached his first Grand Slam quarterfinal partnering Robert Galloway (tennis) at the 2023 US Open (tennis). As a result, he reached the top 50 in the rankings at world No. 49 on 11 September 2023.

=== 2024: Two ATP doubles titles, four ATP finals ===
Partnering with Yuki Bhambri, Olivetti won his maiden ATP Tour doubles title at the 2024 BMW Open in Munich, defeating Andreas Mies and Jan-Lennard Struff in the final.

Olivetti and Bhambri won the title at the 2024 Swiss Open Gstaad, defeating Ugo Humbert and Fabrice Martin. It was the second ATP Tour doubles title for Olivetti.

In September, The pair also reached the final at the Chengdu Open, losing to Sadio Doumbia and Fabien Reboul.

Partnering Pierre-Hugues Herbert, Olivetti reached another final at the 2024 Moselle Open, losing to Sander Arends and Luke Johnson.

=== 2025–2026: New partnership, Top 20 ===
Playing with a new partner, compatriot Théo Arribagé, Olivetti has won seven doubles titles, including the prestigious year-end ATP Finals in Turin, Italy.

== Performance timeline ==
Key
W	F	SF	QF	#R	RR	Q#	DNQ	A	NH

(W) winner; (F) finalist; (SF) semifinalist; (QF) quarterfinalist; (#R) rounds 4, 3, 2, 1; (RR) round-robin stage; (Q#) qualification round; (DNQ) did not qualify; (A) absent; (NH) not held; (SR) strike rate (events won / competed); (W–L) win–loss record.
To avoid confusion and double counting, these charts are updated at the conclusion of a tournament or when the player's participation has ended.

=== Singles ===
Tournament	2011	2012	2013	2014	2015	2016	SR	W–L	Win %
Grand Slam tournaments
Australian Open	A	A	A	Q1	A	A	0 / 0	0–0	–
French Open	Q1	Q2	Q1	1R	A	Q1	0 / 1	0–1	0%
Wimbledon	A	A	Q1	Q1	A	1R	0 / 1	0–1	0%
US Open	A	A	1R	A	A	Q1	0 / 1	0–1	0%
Win–loss	0–0	0–0	0–1	0–1	0–0	0–1	0 / 3	0–3	0%

=== Doubles ===
Current through the 2026 Halle Open.

Tournament	2011	2012	2013	2014	2015	2016	2017	2018	2019	2020	2021	2022	2023	2024	2025	2026	SR	W–L	Win %
Grand Slam tournaments
Australian Open	A	A	A	A	A	A	A	A	A	A	A	A	1R	2R	1R	2R	0 / 4	2–4	33%
French Open	2R	1R	1R	1R	A	2R	1R	A	A	1R	1R	2R	1R	1R	2R		0 / 12	4–12	25%
Wimbledon	A	A	A	A	A	A	A	A	A	NH	A	A	1R	2R	2R		0 / 3	2–3	40%
US Open	A	A	A	A	A	A	A	A	A	A	A	A	QF	3R	2R		0 / 3	6–3	67%
Win–loss	1–1	0–1	0–1	0–1	0–0	1–1	0–1	0–0	0–0	0–1	0–1	1–1	3–4	4–4	3–4	0–1	0 / 22	13–22	37%
ATP Masters 1000
Indian Wells Open	A	A	A	A	A	A	A	A	A	NH	A	A	A	A	A		0 / 0	0–0	–
Miami Open	A	A	A	A	A	A	A	A	A	NH	A	A	A	A	1R		0 / 1	0–1	0%
Monte-Carlo Masters	A	A	A	A	A	A	A	A	A	NH	A	A	A	A	A		0 / 0	0–0	–
Madrid Open	A	A	A	A	A	A	A	A	A	NH	A	A	A	1R	2R		0 / 2	1–2	33%
Italian Open	A	A	A	A	A	A	A	A	A	A	A	A	A	A	A		0 / 0	0–0	–
Canadian Open	A	A	A	A	A	A	A	A	A	NH	A	A	A	A	A		0 / 0	0–0	–
Cincinnati Open	A	A	A	A	A	A	A	A	A	NH	A	A	A	A	A		0 / 0	0–0	–
Shanghai Masters	A	A	A	A	A	A	A	A	A	Not Held			A	A	A		0 / 0	0–0	–
Paris Masters	A	A	A	A	A	A	A	A	A	NH	A	A	A	A	1R		0 / 1	0–1	0%
Win–loss	0–0	0–0	0–0	0–0	0–0	0–0	0–0	0–0	0–0	0–0	0–0	0–0	0–0	0–1	1–3	0–0	0 / 4	1–4	20%
Career statistics
Tournaments	1	2	2	2	0	2	2	0	1	1	6	8	18	21	17	3	86		
Titles	0	0	0	0	0	0	0	0	0	0	0	0	0	2	1	1	4		
Finals	0	0	0	0	0	0	0	0	0	0	1	0	1	6	2	1	11		
Overall win–loss	1–1	0–2	0–2	0–2	0–0	1–2	1–2	0–0	1–1	0–1	2–6	6–8	17–18	32–19	17–16	6–2	83–82		
Win %	50%	0%	0%	0%	—	33%	33%	—	50%	0%	25%	43%	49%	63%	52%	75%	50%		
Year-end ranking	246	185	363	278	—	114	250	394	270	156	117	66	57	44	65				

== Significant finals ==
=== Year-end championships finals ===
==== Doubles: 1 (title) ====
Result	Year	Championship	Surface	Partner	Opponents	Score
Win	2026	ATP Finals, Turin	Hard (i)	(France) Théo Arribagé	(El Salvador) Marcelo Arévalo (Croatia) Mate Pavić	3–6, 7–6^{(7–2)}, [10–6]

== ATP Tour finals ==
=== Doubles: 20 (10 titles, 10 runner-ups) ===
Legend Grand Slam (–) ATP Finals (1–0) ATP 1000 (–) ATP 500 (3–2) ATP 250 (6–8)	Finals by surface Hard (6–6) Clay (2–4) Grass (2–0)	Finals by setting Outdoor (5–6) Indoor (5–4)

Result	W–L	Date	Tournament	Tier	Surface	Partner	Opponents	Score
Loss	0–1	Jul 2021	Swedish Open, Sweden	ATP 250	Clay	(Germany) Andre Begemann	(Netherlands) Sander Arends (Netherlands) David Pel	4–6, 2–6
Loss	0–2	Feb 2023	Open Sud de France, France	ATP 250	Hard (i)	(United States) Maxime Cressy	(Netherlands) Robin Haase (Netherlands) Matwé Middelkoop	6–7^{(4–7)}, 6–4, [6–10]
Loss	0–3	Feb 2024	Open Sud de France, France	ATP 250	Hard (i)	(Austria) Sam Weissborn	(France) Sadio Doumbia (France) Fabien Reboul	7–6^{(7–5)}, 4–6, [6–10]
Win	1–3	Apr 2024	Bavarian Championships, Germany	ATP 250	Clay	(India) Yuki Bhambri	(Germany) Andreas Mies (Germany) Jan-Lennard Struff	7–6^{(8–6)}, 7–6^{(7–5)}
Loss	1–4	May 2024	ATP Lyon Open, France	ATP 250	Clay	(India) Yuki Bhambri	(Finland) Harri Heliövaara (United Kingdom) Henry Patten	6–3, 6–7^{(4–7)}, [8–10]
Win	2–4	Jul 2024	Swiss Open Gstaad, Switzerland	ATP 250	Clay	(India) Yuki Bhambri	(France) Ugo Humbert (France) Fabrice Martin	3–6, 6–3, [10–6]
Loss	2–5	Sep 2024	Chengdu Open, China	ATP 250	Hard	(India) Yuki Bhambri	(France) Sadio Doumbia (France) Fabien Reboul	4–6, 6–4, [4–10]
Loss	2–6	Nov 2024	Moselle Open, France	ATP 250	Hard (i)	(France) Pierre-Hugues Herbert	(Netherlands) Sander Arends (United Kingdom) Luke Johnson	4–6, 6–3, [3–10]
Loss	2–7	Jul 2025	Swiss Open Gstaad, Switzerland	ATP 250	Clay	(Germany) Hendrik Jebens	(Portugal) Francisco Cabral (Austria) Lucas Miedler	6–7^{(4–7)}, 7–6^{(7–4)}, [10–3]
Win	3–7	Oct 2025	Almaty Open, Kazakhstan	ATP 250	Hard (i)	(France) Théo Arribagé	(Germany) Jakob Schnaitter (Germany) Mark Wallner	6–4, 7–6^{(10–8)}
Win	4–7	Jan 2026	Auckland Open, New Zealand	ATP 250	Hard	(France) Théo Arribagé	(Austria) Alexander Erler (United States) Robert Galloway	7–6^{(7–2)}, 6–4
Win	5–7	Feb 2026	Open Sud de France, France	ATP 250	Hard (i)	(France) Théo Arribagé	(Germany) Constantin Frantzen (Netherlands) Robin Haase	7–6^{(8–6)}, 6–1
Win	6–7	Feb 2026	Dallas Open, US	ATP 500	Hard (i)	(France) Théo Arribagé	(Spain) Marcel Granollers (Argentina) Horacio Zeballos	6–3, 7–6^{(7–4)}
Loss	6–8	Apr 2026	Bavarian Championships, Germany	ATP 500	Clay	(France) Théo Arribagé	(Germany) Jakob Schnaitter (Germany) Mark Wallner	4–6, 7–6^{(7–4)}, [10–12]
Win	7–8	Jun 2026	Halle Open, Germany	ATP 500	Grass	(France) Théo Arribagé	(Germany) Daniel Altmaier (Brazil) João Fonseca	7–6^{(7–2)}, 6–4
Win	8–8	Jun 2026	Mallorca Championships, Spain	ATP 250	Grass	(France) Théo Arribagé	(Sweden) André Göransson (United States) Evan King	7–6^{(8–6)}, 3–6, [11–9]
Loss	8–9	Oct 2026	Japan Open, Japan	ATP 500	Hard	(France) Théo Arribagé	(United States) Austin Krajicek (Croatia) Nikola Mektić	6–7^{(5–7)}, 7–5, [6–10]
Loss	8–10	Oct 2026	ATP Lyon Open, France	ATP 250	Hard (i)	(France) Théo Arribagé	(United Kingdom) Julian Cash (United Kingdom) Lloyd Glasspool	6–4, 3–6, [8–10]
Win	9–10	Nov 2026	Swiss Indoors, Switzerland	ATP 500	Hard (i)	(France) Théo Arribagé	(Switzerland) Henry Bernet (Switzerland) Dominic Stricker	7–6^{(8–6)}, 7–6^{(8–6)}
Win	10–10	Nov 2026	ATP Finals, Italy	Tour Finals	Hard (i)	(France) Théo Arribagé	(El Salvador) Marcelo Arévalo (Croatia) Mate Pavić	3–6, 7–6^{(7–2)}, [10–6]

== ATP Challenger and ITF Tour finals ==
=== Singles: 18 (6–12) ===
Legend ATP Challenger (0–2) ITF Futures (6–10)	Finals by surface Hard (4–8) Grass (1–0) Carpet (1–4)

Result	W–L	Date	Tournament	Tier	Surface	Opponent	Score
Win	1–0	Oct 2010	France F16, Sarreguemines	Futures	Carpet (i)	(France) Rudy Coco	7–6^{(7–4)}, 6–4
Loss	1–1	Mar 2011	Canada F1, Montreal	Futures	Hard (i)	(France) Charles-Antoine Brézac	4–6, 4–6
Loss	1–2	Oct 2011	France F16, Forbach	Futures	Carpet (i)	(France) Rudy Coco	6–4, 6–7^{(2–7)}, 6–7^{(1–7)}
Win	2–2	Jul 2012	Great Britain F9, Manchester	Futures	Grass	(United Kingdom) Josh Goodall	7–5, 6–1
Loss	2–3	Aug 2012	Segovia, Spain	Challenger	Hard	(Russia) Evgeny Donskoy	1–6, 6–7^{(11–13)}
Loss	2–4	Oct 2012	France F19, Nevers	Futures	Hard (i)	(France) Nicolas Renavand	6–7^{(4–7)}, 3–6
Loss	2–5	Jun 2013	Israel F11, Herzliya	Futures	Hard	(Russia) Alexander Kudryavtsev	7–5, 4–6, 4–6
Loss	2–6	Jul 2013	Ireland F1, Dublin	Futures	Carpet	(United Kingdom) Daniel Cox	3–6, 3–6
Loss	2–7	Aug 2013	Segovia, Spain	Challenger	Hard	(Spain) Pablo Carreño Busta	4–6, 6–7^{(2–7)}
Loss	2–8	Mar 2014	Switzerland F2, Trimbach	Futures	Carpet (i)	(Germany) Andreas Beck	6–7^{(5–7)}, 4–6
Win	3–8	Oct 2016	France F21, Nevers	Futures	Hard (i)	(France) Grégoire Jacq	7–6^{(8–6)}, 6–3
Loss	3–9	Mar 2017	France F7, Villers-lès-Nancy	Futures	Hard (i)	(France) Maxime Tabatruong	6–4, 6–7^{(5–7)}, 4–6
Win	4–9	May 2017	Bulgaria F1, Sozopol	Futures	Hard	(Bulgaria) Dimitar Kuzmanov	6–4, 7–6^{(7–5)}
Win	5–9	Jun 2017	Israel F10, Kiryat Shmona	Futures	Hard	(France) David Guez	6–3, 7–5
Loss	5–10	Jul 2017	France F15, Ajaccio	Futures	Hard	(Italy) Edoardo Eremin	2–6, 3–6
Loss	5–11	Jan 2018	France F2, Bressuire	Futures	Hard (i)	(France) Grégoire Barrère	3–6, 7–6^{(8–6)}, 6–7^{(5–7)}
Win	6–11	Sep 2018	France F16, Bagnères-de-Bigorre	Futures	Hard	(France) Corentin Denolly	7–6^{(7–2)}, 7–6^{(7–3)}
Loss	6–12	Sep 2018	France F19, Sarreguemines	Futures	Carpet(i)	(Germany) Elmar Ejupovic	4–6, 5–7

=== Doubles: 83 (54–29) ===
Legend ATP Challenger (26–17) ITF Futures/World Tennis (28–12)	Finals by surface Hard (34–20) Clay (7–7) Grass (1–1) Carpet (12–1)

Result	W–L	Date	Tournament	Tier	Surface	Partner	Opponents	Score
Loss	0–1	Jul 2010	France F10, Montauban	Futures	Clay	(France) Julien Obry	(Canada) Philip Bester (France) Jonathan Eysseric	Walkover
Win	1–1	Oct 2010	France F16, Sarreguemines	Futures	Carpet (i)	(France) Julien Obry	(France) Baptiste Bayet (France) Kevin Botti	7–6^{(7–5)}, 6–4
Loss	1–2	Oct 2010	France F18, Saint-Dizier	Futures	Hard (i)	(France) Kenny de Schepper	(France) Julien Maes (France) Fabrice Martin	6–2, 4–6, [4–10]
Loss	1–3	Jul 2011	Great Britain F8, Manchester	Futures	Grass	(Tunisia) Malek Jaziri	(United Kingdom) Chris Eaton (United Kingdom) Josh Goodall	4–6, 6–7^{(3–7)}
Win	2–3	Jul 2011	Ireland F1, Dublin	Futures	Carpet	(United Kingdom) Neal Skupski	(Republic of Ireland) James Cluskey (Republic of Ireland) James McGee	7–6^{(7–4)}, 6–3
Win	3–3	Sep 2011	France F13, Bagnères-de-Bigorre	Futures	Hard	(France) Charles-Antoine Brézac	(Brazil) Caio Silva (Moldova) Roman Tudoreanu	7–5, 6–3
Win	4–3	Sep 2011	France F14, Mulhouse	Futures	Hard (i)	(France) Pierre-Hugues Herbert	(Republic of Ireland) James Cluskey (France) Fabrice Martin	6–3, 6–4
Win	5–3	Oct 2011	France F20, Rodez	Futures	Hard (i)	(France) Pierre-Hugues Herbert	(South Africa) Jean Andersen (Republic of Ireland) James Cluskey	6–4, 6–3
Win	6–3	Jan 2012	Germany F1, Schwieberdingen	Futures	Carpet (i)	(France) Elie Rousset	(United Kingdom) Miles Bugby (United Kingdom) Josh Goodall	6–4, 6–4
Win	7–3	Apr 2012	Le Gosier, Guadeloupe	Challenger	Hard	(France) Pierre-Hugues Herbert	(Australia) Paul Hanley (Australia) Jordan Kerr	7–5, 1–6, [10–7]
Win	8–3	May 2012	Sweden F1, Karlskrona	Futures	Clay	(Chile) Hans Podlipnik Castillo	(United Kingdom) Lewis Burton (United Kingdom) George Morgan	6–3, 7–6^{(7–3)}
Win	9–3	Jul 2012	Ireland F1, Dublin	Futures	Carpet	(France) Elie Rousset	(Republic of Ireland) James McGee (Spain) Jaime Pulgar-Garcia	6–3, 6–4
Win	10–3	Aug 2012	Germany F14, Karlsruhe	Futures	Clay	(Germany) Bastian Knittel	(Italy) Giorgio Portaluri (France) François-Arthur Vibert	6–4, 6–4
Win	11–3	Jun 2013	Israel F10, Herzliya	Futures	Hard	(France) Elie Rousset	(France) Antoine Benneteau (South Africa) Dean O'Brien	6–3, 7–6^{(8–6)}
Win	12–3	Jun 2013	Israel F11, Herzliya	Futures	Hard	(France) Elie Rousset	(Republic of Ireland) Sam Barry (Czech Republic) Michal Konečný	6–4, 6–7^{(5–7)}, [10–4]
Win	13–3	Jun 2013	Germany F7, Römerberg	Futures	Clay	(France) Pierre-Hugues Herbert	(Czech Republic) Marek Michalička (Czech Republic) David Pultr	6–7^{(3–7)}, 6–4, [10–5]
Win	14–3	Jul 2013	Great Britain F12, Manchester	Futures	Grass	(United Kingdom) Neal Skupski	(Australia) Zach Itzstein (United Kingdom) Brydan Klein	7–6^{(7–4)}, 6–3
Win	15–3	Sep 2013	Saint-Rémy-de-Provence, France	Challenger	Hard	(France) Pierre-Hugues Herbert	(France) Marc Gicquel (France) Josselin Ouanna	6–3, 6–7^{(5–7)}, [15–13]
Win	16–3	Feb 2014	Quimper, France	Challenger	Hard (i)	(France) Pierre-Hugues Herbert	(Croatia) Toni Androić (Croatia) Nikola Mektić	6–4, 6–3
Loss	16–4	Mar 2014	Cherbourg, France	Challenger	Hard (i)	(France) Pierre-Hugues Herbert	(Finland) Henri Kontinen (Russia) Konstantin Kravchuk	4–6, 7–6^{(7–3)}, [7–10]
Loss	16–5	Apr 2014	Vercelli, Italy	Challenger	Clay	(France) Pierre-Hugues Herbert	(Italy) Matteo Donati (Italy) Stefano Napolitano	6–7^{(2–7)}, 3–6
Win	17–5	Feb 2016	Wrocław, Poland	Challenger	Hard (i)	(France) Pierre-Hugues Herbert	(Croatia) Nikola Mektić (Croatia) Antonio Šančić	6–3, 7–6^{(7–4)}
Win	18–5	Mar 2016	Quimper, France (2)	Challenger	Hard (i)	(France) Tristan Lamasine	(Croatia) Nikola Mektić (Croatia) Antonio Šančić	6–2, 4–6, [10–7]
Loss	18–6	Jul 2016	Portugal F8, Idanha-a-Nova	Futures	Hard	(France) Hugo Grenier	(Portugal) Nuno Deus (Portugal) Fred Gil	6–3, 6–7^{(4–7)}, [5–10]
Win	19–6	Jul 2016	Recanati, Italy	Challenger	Hard	(Germany) Kevin Krawietz	(Belgium) Ruben Bemelmans (Spain) Adrián Menéndez Maceiras	6–3, 7–6^{(7–4)}
Win	20–6	Oct 2016	France F20, Sarreguemines	Futures	Carpet (i)	(France) Dan Added	(Germany) Denis Kapric (Germany) Lukas Ollert	7–6^{(13–11)}, 6–1
Win	21–6	Nov 2016	Eckental, Germany	Challenger	Carpet (i)	(Germany) Kevin Krawietz	(Czech Republic) Roman Jebavý (Slovakia) Andrej Martin	6–7^{(8–10)}, 6–4, [10–7]
Win	22–6	Nov 2016	Ortisei, Italy	Challenger	Hard (i)	(Germany) Kevin Krawietz	(Canada) Frank Dancevic (Serbia) Marko Tepavac	6–4, 6–4
Win	23–6	Mar 2017	France F7, Villers-lès-Nancy	Futures	Hard (i)	(France) Dan Added	(Italy) Erik Crepaldi (France) Yannick Jankovits	6–4, 6–4
Win	24–6	May 2017	Israel F7, Herzliya	Futures	Hard	(Switzerland) Antoine Bellier	(Israel) Dekel Bar (Argentina) Matías Franco Descotte	7–6^{(7–1)}, 6–4
Win	25–6	May 2017	Israel F8, Netanya	Futures	Hard	(Switzerland) Antoine Bellier	(France) Yanais Laurent (Canada) Filip Peliwo	7–6^{(8–6)}, 7–5
Loss	25–7	Jul 2017	Portugal F10, Torres Vedras	Futures	Hard	(France) Hugo Voljacques	(Venezuela) Jordi Muñoz Abreu (Spain) David Pérez Sanz	4–6, 6–7^{(5–7)}
Win	26–7	Sep 2017	France F19, Mulhouse	Futures	Hard (i)	(France) Dan Added	(Germany) Johannes Härteis (France) Hugo Voljacques	6–4, 6–7^{(3–7)}, [10–7]
Loss	26–8	Oct 2017	France F19, Forbach	Futures	Hard (i)	(France) Hugo Voljacques	(Germany) Robin Kern (Germany) Sami Reinwein	6–3, 3–6, [5–10]
Win	27–8	Jan 2018	France F3, Veigy-Foncenex	Futures	Carpet (i)	(France) Dan Added	(Netherlands) Antal van der Duim (Netherlands) Tim van Terheijden	2–6, 7–6^{(7–4)}, [10–8]
Win	28–8	Feb 2018	Switzerland F2, Bellevue	Futures	Carpet (i)	(Belgium) Niels Desein	(United States) Charlie Emhardt (United States) Josh Hagar	6–3, 6–1
Win	29–8	Mar 2018	France F4, Toulouse	Futures	Hard (i)	(France) Dan Added	(Netherlands) Igor Sijsling (Netherlands) Botic van de Zandschulp	6–3, 7–5
Loss	29–9	Jun 2018	Tunisia F21, Djerba	Futures	Hard	(United States) John Paul Fruttero	(Tunisia) Anis Ghorbel (Bulgaria) Vasko Mladenov	3–6, 2–6
Loss	29–10	Jun 2018	Israel F8, Tel Aviv	Futures	Hard	(France) Dan Added	(Israel) Daniel Cukierman (Israel) Edan Leshem	4–6, 2–6
Win	30–10	Jun 2018	Israel F9, Netanya	Futures	Hard	(France) Dan Added	(Italy) Francesco Ferrari (Mexico) Tigre Hank	6–3, 6–4
Loss	30–11	Sep 2018	France F16, Bagnères-de-Bigorre	Futures	Hard	(France) Dan Added	(Belgium) Niels Desein (Belgium) Yannick Mertens	7–6^{(9–7)}, 5–7, [5–10]
Win	31–11	Sep 2018	France F19, Sarreguemines	Futures	Carpet (i)	(France) Dan Added	(Germany) Elmar Ejupovic (Belgium) Micheal Geerts	7–6^{(7–5)}, 6–3
Win	32–11	Jan 2019	M15 Bressuire, France	WTT	Carpet (i)	(France) Dan Added	(Czech Republic) Michail Konecny (Czech Republic) Tomáš Macháč	7–6^{(7–5)}, 6–3
Win	33–11	Jan 2019	M15 Veigy-Foncenex, France	WTT	Carpet (i)	(France) Dan Added	(France) Yanais Laurent (France) Maxime Tchoutakian	6–0, 4–6, [10–7]
Loss	33–12	Feb 2019	M25 Oberentfelden, Switzerland	WTT	Carpet (i)	(Israel) Edan Leshem	(Czech Republic) Marek Jaloviec (Czech Republic) Michael Vrbenský	5–7, 1–6
Loss	33–13	Jun 2019	M25 Palma del Río, Spain	WTT	Hard	(Austria) Maximilian Neuchrist	(France) Tom Jomby (France) Mick Lescure	6–7^{(5–7)}, 4–6
Loss	33–14	Sep 2019	M25 Bagnères-de-Bigorre, France	WTT	Hard	(Israel) Edan Leshem	(France) Jonathan Eysseric (France) Tom Jomby	1–6, 6–3, [3–10]
Win	34–14	Sep 2019	M15 Forbach, France	WTT	Carpet(i)	(France) Dan Added	(United Kingdom) Jack Findel-Hawkins (Germany) Lasse Muscheites	6–3, 6–4
Win	35–14	Oct 2019	M25 Nevers, France	WTT	Hard (i)	(France) Dan Added	(France) Quentin Halys (France) Matteo Martineau	6–4, 7–5
Win	36–14	Oct 2019	M25 Rodez, France	WTT	Hard (i)	(France) Dan Added	(France) Benjamin Bonzi (France) Grégoire Jacq	7–5, 6–7^{(1–7)}, [10–4]
Loss	36–15	Feb 2020	Cherbourg, France	Challenger	Hard	(France) Dan Added	(Russia) Pavel Kotov (Russia) Roman Safiullin	6–7^{(6–8)}, 7–5, [10–12]
Win	37–15	Oct 2020	Alicante, Spain	Challenger	Clay	(France) Enzo Couacaud	(Spain) Íñigo Cervantes (Spain) Oriol Roca Batalla	4–6, 6–4, [10–2]
Win	38–15	Nov 2020	Parma, Italy	Challenger	Hard (i)	(France) Grégoire Barrère	(France) Sadio Doumbia (France) Fabien Reboul	6–2, 6–4
Win	39–15	Nov 2020	Ortisei, Italy (2)	Challenger	Hard (i)	(Germany) Andre Begemann	(Croatia) Ivan Sabanov (Croatia) Matej Sabanov	6–3, 6–2
Win	40–15	Jan 2021	Quimper, France (3)	Challenger	Hard (i)	(France) Grégoire Barrère	(United States) James Cerretani (Switzerland) Marc-Andrea Hüsler	5–7, 7–6^{(9–7)}, [10–8]
Loss	40–16	Feb 2021	Cherbourg, France	Challenger	Hard (i)	(France) Antoine Hoang	(Slovakia) Lukáš Klein (Slovakia) Alex Molčan	6–1, 5–7, [6–10]
Loss	40–17	Apr 2021	Split, Croatia	Challenger	Clay	(France) Grégoire Barrère	(Poland) Szymon Walków (Poland) Jan Zieliński	2–6, 5–7
Loss	40–18	June 2021	Lyon, France	Challenger	Clay	(France) Tristan Lamasine	(Uruguay) Martín Cuevas (Uruguay) Pablo Cuevas	3–6, 6–7^{(2–7)}
Loss	40–19	Jul 2021	Trieste, Italy	Challenger	Clay	(France) Antoine Hoang	(Brazil) Orlando Luz (Brazil) Felipe Meligeni Alves	5–7, 7–6^{(8–6)}, [5–10]
Win	41–19	Oct 2021	Orléans, France	Challenger	Hard (i)	(France) Pierre-Hugues Herbert	(France) Antoine Hoang (France) Kyrian Jacquet	6–2, 2–6, [11–9]
Loss	41–20	Nov 2021	Roanne, France	Challenger	Hard (i)	(Monaco) Romain Arneodo	(United Kingdom) Lloyd Glasspool (Finland) Harri Heliövaara	6–7^{(5–7)}, 7–6^{(7–5)}, [10–12]
Win	42–20	Jan 2022	Quimper, France (4)	Challenger	Hard (i)	(Spain) David Vega Hernández	(Netherlands) Sander Arends (Netherlands) David Pel	3–6, 6–4, [10–8]
Win	43–20	Feb 2022	Pau, France	Challenger	Hard (i)	(Spain) David Vega Hernández	(Poland) Karol Drzewiecki (Poland) Kacper Żuk	w/o
Win	44–20	Mar 2022	Biel/Bienne, Switzerland	Challenger	Hard (i)	(France) Pierre-Hugues Herbert	(India) Purav Raja (India) Ramkumar Ramanathan	6–3, 6–4
Win	45–20	Apr 2022	Split, Croatia	Challenger	Clay	(United States) Nathaniel Lammons	(France) Sadio Doumbia (France) Fabien Reboul	4–6, 7–6^{(8–6)}, [10–7]
Win	46–20	Jul 2022	Pozoblanco, Spain	Challenger	Hard	(France) Dan Added	(Romania) Victor Vlad Cornea (Venezuela) Luis David Martínez	3–6, 6–1, [12–10]
Loss	46–21	Sep 2022	Cassis, France	Challenger	Hard	(Monaco) Romain Arneodo	(Belgium) Michael Geerts (Belgium) Joran Vliegen	4–6, 6–7^{(6–8)}
Loss	46–22	Sep 2022	Rennes, France	Challenger	Hard (i)	(France) Dan Added	(France) Jonathan Eysseric (Netherlands) David Pel	4–6, 4–6
Win	47–22	Oct 2022	Alicante, Spain (2)	Challenger	Hard	(Netherlands) Robin Haase	(Uzbekistan) Sanjar Fayziev (Uzbekistan) Sergey Fomin	7–6^{(7–5)}, 7–5
Win	48–22	Oct 2022	Saint-Tropez, France	Challenger	Hard	(France) Dan Added	(Monaco) Romain Arneodo (Austria) Tristan-Samuel Weissborn	6–3, 3–6, [12–10]
Loss	48–23	Oct 2022	Bergamo, Italy	Challenger	Hard (i)	(France) Jonathan Eysseric	(Germany) Henri Squire (Germany) Jan-Lennard Struff	4–6, 7–6^{(7–5)}, [7–10]
Win	49–23	Feb 2023	Pau, France (2)	Challenger	Hard (i)	(France) Dan Added	(United Kingdom) Julian Cash (Germany) Constantin Frantzen	3–6, 6–1, [10–8]
Win	50–23	Mar 2023	Saint-Brieuc, France	Challenger	Hard (i)	(France) Dan Added	(Finland) Patrik Niklas-Salminen (Netherlands) Bart Stevens	4–6, 7–6^{(9–7)}, [10–6]
Win	51–23	May 2023	Prague, Czech Republic	Challenger	Clay	(France) Dan Added	(Latvia) Miķelis Lībietis (United States) Hunter Reese	6–4, 6–3
Win	52–23	Sep 2023	Saint-Tropez, France (2)	Challenger	Hard	(France) Dan Added	(France) Jonathan Eysseric (France) Harold Mayot	3–6, 1–0 ret.
Loss	52–24	Oct 2023	Brest, France	Challenger	Hard (i)	(United States) Robert Galloway	(India) Yuki Bhambri (United Kingdom) Julian Cash	7–6^{(7–5)}, 3–6, [5–10]
Loss	52–25	Jan 2024	Canberra, Australia	Challenger	Hard	(Sweden) André Göransson	(Spain) Daniel Rincón (Jordan) Abdullah Shelbayh	6–7^{(4–7)}, 3–6
Loss	52–26	Mar 2024	Girona, Spain	Challenger	Clay	(France) Jonathan Eysseric	(Ecuador) Gonzalo Escobar (Kazakhstan) Aleksandr Nedovyesov	6–7^{(1–7)}, 4–6
Loss	52–27	Mar 2025	Naples, Italy	Challenger	Clay	(France) Geoffrey Blancaneaux	(Austria) Alexander Erler (Germany) Constantin Frantzen	4–6, 4–6
Win	53–27	Aug 2025	Hagen, Germany	Challenger	Clay	(Germany) Hendrik Jebens	(United States) Vasil Kirkov (Netherlands) Bart Stevens	6–4, 6–7^{(2–7)}, [10–8]
Loss	53–28	Sep 2025	Rennes, France	Challenger	Hard (i)	(Germany) Hendrik Jebens	(Finland) Patrik Niklas-Salminen (Czech Republic) Matěj Vocel	3–6, 3–6
Win	54–28	Oct 2025	Mouilleron-le-Captif, France	Challenger	Hard (i)	(France) Grégoire Jacq	(United Kingdom) Hamish Stewart (United Kingdom) Harry Wendelken	7–6^{(7–5)}, 6–3
Loss	54–29	Oct 2025	Brest, France	Challenger	Hard (i)	(France) Théo Arribagé	(Belgium) Sander Gillé (Netherlands) Sem Verbeek	6–7^{(5–7)}, 6–7^{(4–7)}

== Wins against top 10 players ==
- Olivetti has a 1–1 record against players who were ranked in the top 10 at the time the match was played.

Season	2012	Total
Wins	1	1

#	Player	Rk	Event	Surface	Rd	Score	Rk	Ref
2012
1.	(United States) Mardy Fish	8	Marseilles, France	Hard (i)	2R	6–3, 3–6, 6–3	388	

== See also ==
- Fastest recorded tennis serves
