= Dan Added =

French tennis player (born 1999)

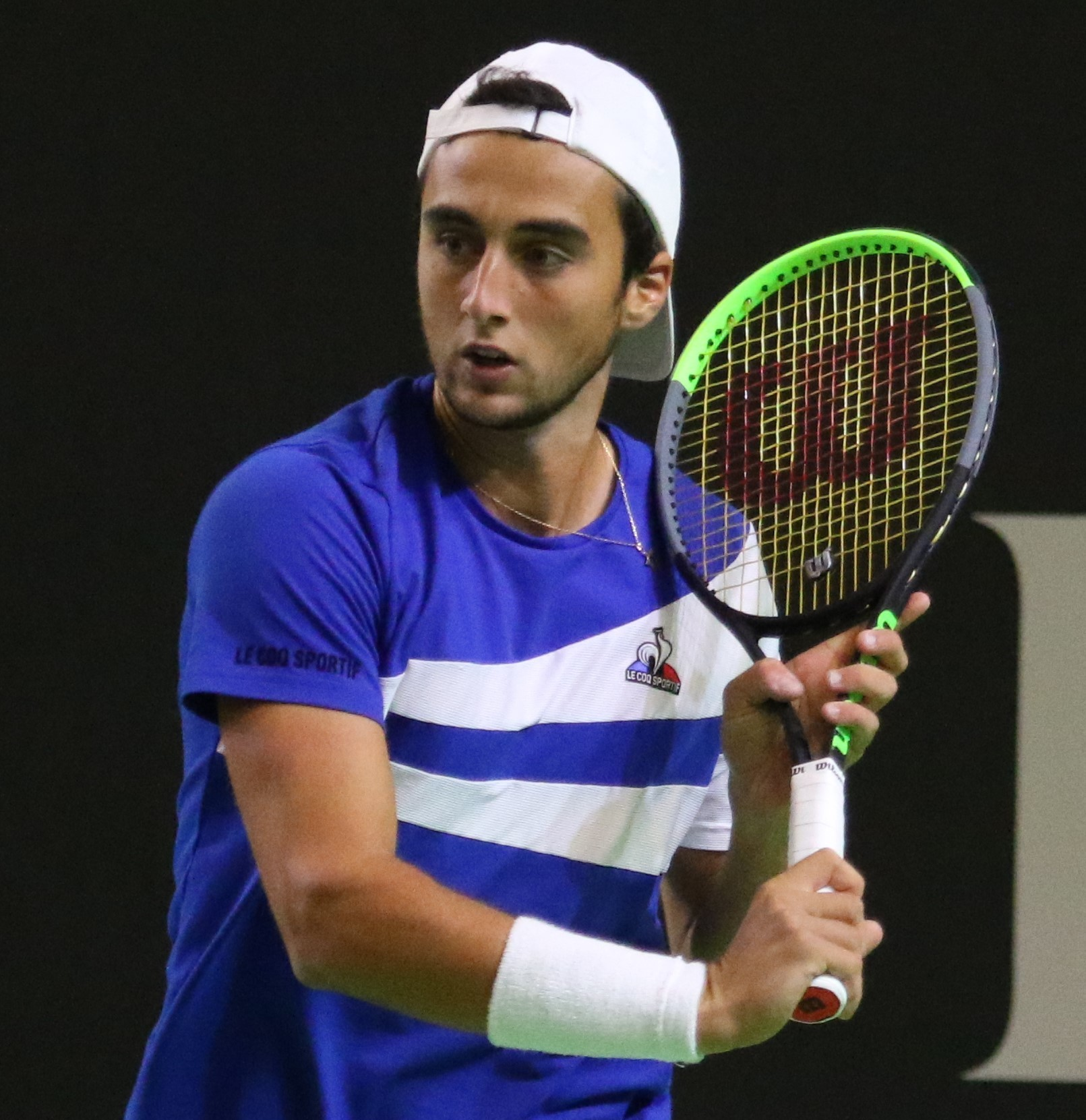
- Added at the 2021 Open de Rennes
- Country (sports): France
- Residence: Strasbourg, France
- Born: 13 April 1999 (age 27) Strasbourg, France
- Height: 1.83 m (6 ft 0 in)
- Plays: Right-handed (two-handed backhand)
- Prize money: US $598,614

Singles
- Career record: 0–1 (at ATP Tour level, Grand Slam level, and in Davis Cup)
- Career titles: 0
- Highest ranking: No. 194 (17 November 2025)
- Current ranking: No. 440 (9 November 2026)

Grand Slam singles results
- Australian Open: Q1 (2026)
- French Open: Q2 (2023)
- Wimbledon: Q1 (2026)
- US Open: Q1 (2026)

Doubles
- Career record: 6–9 (at ATP Tour level, Grand Slam level, and in Davis Cup)
- Career titles: 14 Challengers
- Highest ranking: No. 77 (25 September 2023)
- Current ranking: No. 271 (9 November 2026)

Grand Slam doubles results
- French Open: 2R (2021, 2024)

Grand Slam mixed doubles results
- French Open: 1R (2023)
- Last updated on: 9 November 2026.

Dan Added (born 13 April 1999) is a French professional tennis player. Added has a career high ATP singles ranking of world No. 194 achieved on 17 November 2025 and a career high doubles ranking of No. 77 achieved on 25 September 2023. Added has won 14 Challenger doubles titles.

== Career ==
=== 2019–21: ATP and Grand slam doubles debut ===
Added made his ATP main draw doubles debut at the 2019 Moselle Open after receiving a wildcard partnering Albano Olivetti.

Added made his Grand Slam main draw doubles debut at the 2021 French Open also as a wildcard partnering with Jo-Wilfried Tsonga where he recorded his first Major win.

=== 2023–24: Challenger singles final, Doubles top 100, Major mixed doubles debut ===
In March, Added entered the main draw of the 2023 Teréga Open Pau–Pyrénées as a lucky loser. He played his first singles final on the ATP Challenger Tour in Saint-Brieuc, France, losing in three sets to Ričardas Berankis. At the same tournament, Added won the doubles title partnering with Albano Olivetti.

Added was added to the qualifying draw of the 2023 French Open, where he reached the second round of qualifying. At the same tournament, he also received a wildcard for the mixed doubles partnering Estelle Cascino, making his debut at the mixed event. Added also made his debut in the top 100 in the doubles rankings following four titles on the ATP Challenger Tour in May 2024 and the top 80 at the end of September 2023, following another four titles. In October 2023, Added lost in the first round to Dino Prižmić at the 2023 Open de Vendée.

Added received a wildcard for the 2024 French Open partnering Théo Arribagé.

=== 2025–26: ATP & top 200 debuts, Major qualifications ===
In August, Added reached his second career Challenger final at the Crete Challenger III, losing to Rafael Jódar in the final. He also reached the doubles final, partnering with Arthur Reymond. He reached the final again the following week at the Crete Challenger IV, losing to top seed Moez Echargui in the final. In September, Added reached the biggest final of his career at the Challenger 125, the Saint-Tropez Open, but lost again to Moez Echargui in straight sets. As a result he reached a new career-high in the top 210 in the singles rankings on 22 September 2025.

In November, Added made his singles ATP Tour main draw debut at the Moselle Open as a lucky loser. In the first qualifying round, he defeated Tristan Schoolkate, his first top 100 win. He lost to fellow lucky loser and compatriot Kyrian Jacquet in the main draw. At the 2025 All In Open in Lyon, where he also entered the main draw as a lucky loser, Added reached the semifinals after defeating Kyrian Jacquet in the quarterfinal. As a result, he entered the top 200 at world No. 194 in the singles rankings on 17 November 2025.

== Performance timeline ==
Key
| W | F | SF | QF | #R | RR | Q# | P# | DNQ | A | Z# | PO | G | S | B | NMS | NTI | P | NH |

(W) winner; (F) finalist; (SF) semifinalist; (QF) quarterfinalist; (#R) rounds 4, 3, 2, 1; (RR) round-robin stage; (Q#) qualification round; (P#) preliminary round; (DNQ) did not qualify; (A) absent; (Z#) Davis/Fed Cup Zonal Group (with number indication) or (PO) play-off; (G) gold, (S) silver or (B) bronze Olympic/Paralympic medal; (NMS) not a Masters tournament; (NTI) not a Tier I tournament; (P) postponed; (NH) not held; (SR) strike rate (events won / competed); (W–L) win–loss record.
To avoid confusion and double counting, these charts are updated at the conclusion of a tournament or when the player's participation has ended.

=== Singles ===
Current through the 2026 US Open qualifying

| Tournament | 2023 | 2024 | 2025 | 2026 | SR | W–L | Win% |
|---|---|---|---|---|---|---|---|
Grand Slam tournaments
| Australian Open | A | A | A | Q1 | 0 / 0 | 0–0 | – |
| French Open | Q2 | A | A | Q1 | 0 / 0 | 0–0 | – |
| Wimbledon | A | A | A | Q1 | 0 / 0 | 0–0 | – |
| US Open | A | A | A | Q1 | 0 / 0 | 0–0 | – |
| Win–loss | 0–0 | 0–0 | 0–0 | 0–0 | 0 / 0 | 0–0 | – |

== ATP Challenger and ITF Tour finals ==
=== Singles: 24 (11 titles, 13 runner-ups) ===
| Legend ATP Challenger Tour (0–4) ITF Futures/World Tennis Tour (11–9) | Finals by surface Hard (8–12) Clay (1–0) Carpet (2–1) |

| Result | W–L | Date | Tournament | Tier | Surface | Partner | Score |
|---|---|---|---|---|---|---|---|
| Loss | 0–1 | Nov 2017 | Czech Republic F11, Valašské Meziříčí | Futures | Hard | (Russia) Pavel Kotov | 0–6, 5–7 |
| Win | 1–1 | Apr 2019 | M25+H Abuja, Nigeria | World Tennis Tour | Hard | (France) Tom Jomby | 7–5, 2–0, ret. |
| Win | 2–1 | Aug 2019 | M15 Lambermont, Belgium | World Tennis Tour | Clay | (France) Matthieu Perchicot | 4–6, 7–6^{(7–4)}, 7–5 |
| Win | 3–1 | Sep 2019 | M25+H Mulhouse, France | World Tennis Tour | Hard | (France) Arthur Rinderknech | 7–6^{(7–4)}, 2–6, 6–3 |
| Win | 4–1 | Aug 2021 | M15 Monastir, Tunisia | World Tennis Tour | Hard | (Argentina) Santiago Rodríguez Taverna | 6–3, 6–4 |
| Win | 5–1 | Oct 2021 | M15 Forbach, France | World Tennis Tour | Carpet | (United Kingdom) Luke Johnson | 6–4, 7–6^{(7–2)} |
| Win | 6–1 | Oct 2021 | M25 Sarreguemines, France | World Tennis Tour | Carpet | (Belgium) Gauthier Onclin | 6–3, 6–4 |
| Loss | 6–2 | Jun 2022 | M25 Santo Domingo, Dominican Republic | World Tennis Tour | Hard | (Dominican Republic) Roberto Cid Subervi | 2–6, 3–6 |
| Loss | 6–3 | Jun 2022 | M25 Santo Domingo, Dominican Republic | World Tennis Tour | Hard | (United States) Martin Damm | 3–6, 3–6 |
| Loss | 6–4 | Jul 2022 | M25+H Ajaccio, France | World Tennis Tour | Hard | (France) Sascha Gueymard Wayenburg | 4–6, 7–5, 4–6 |
| Loss | 6–5 | Oct 2022 | M25 Sarreguemines, France | World Tennis Tour | Carpet (i) | (Germany) Mats Rosenkranz | 3–6, 6–3, 3–6 |
| Win | 7–5 | Nov 2022 | M15 Villers-lès-Nancy, France | World Tennis Tour | Hard (i) | (France) Boris Fassbender | 6–4, 5–7, 6–2 |
| Loss | 7–6 | Mar 2023 | Saint Brieuc, France | Challenger | Hard (i) | (Lithuania) Ričardas Berankis | 3-6, 7-6^{(7–3)}, 6-7^{(5-7)} |
| Win | 8–6 | Aug 2023 | M25 Idanha-a-Nova, Portugal | World Tennis Tour | Hard | (Spain) Alberto Barroso Campos | 6–2, 6–2 |
| Win | 9–6 | Mar 2025 | M25 Saint-Dizier, France | World Tennis Tour | Hard | (France) Loann Massard | 6–1, 4–6, 7–5 |
| Win | 10–6 | Apr 2025 | M15 Lons-le-Saunier, France | World Tennis Tour | Hard | (France) Lucas Poullain | 5–7, 7–6^{(8–6)}, 6–3 |
| Win | 11–6 | Apr 2025 | M15 Monastir, Tunisia | World Tennis Tour | Hard | (United Kingdom) James Story | 6–4, 6–3 |
| Loss | 11–7 | Jun 2025 | M25 Elvas, Portugal | World Tennis Tour | Hard | (United States) Martin Damm | 3–6, 2–6 |
| Loss | 11–8 | Aug 2025 | M25 Monastir, Tunisia | World Tennis Tour | Hard | (Tunisia) Moez Echargui | 3–6, 4–6 |
| Loss | 11–9 | Aug 2025 | Hersonissos III, Greece | Challenger | Hard | (Spain) Rafael Jódar | 4–6, 2–6 |
| Loss | 11–10 | Aug 2025 | Hersonissos IV, Greece | Challenger | Hard | (Tunisia) Moez Echargui | 7–5, 4–6, 0–3 Ret. |
| Loss | 11–11 | Sep 2025 | Saint Tropez, France | Challenger 125 | Hard | (Tunisia) Moez Echargui | 3–6, 4–6 |
| Loss | 11–12 | Jun 2026 | M25+H Ajaccio, France | World Tennis Tour | Hard | (France) Laurent Lokoli | 6–3, 3–6, 2–6 |
| Loss | 11–13 | Aug 2026 | M25 Idanha-a-Nova, Portugal | World Tennis Tour | Hard | (South Africa) Philip Henning | 4–6, 3–6 |

=== Doubles: 86 (51–36) ===
| Legend ATP Challenger Tour (14–9) ITF Futures/World Tennis Tour (37–27) | Finals by surface Hard (34–26) Clay (12–9) Carpet (5–1) |

| Result | W–L | Date | Tournament | Tier | Surface | Partner | Opponent | Score |
|---|---|---|---|---|---|---|---|---|
| Win | 1–0 | Oct 2016 | France F20, Sarreguemines | Futures | Carpet | (France) Albano Olivetti | (Germany) Denis Kapric (Germany) Lukas Ollert | 7–6^{(13–11)}, 6–1 |
| Win | 2–0 | Mar 2017 | France F7, Villers-lès-Nancy | Futures | Hard | (France) Albano Olivetti | (Italy) Erik Crepaldi (France) Yannick Jankovits | 6–4, 6–4 |
| Loss | 2–1 | Aug 2017 | Germany F11, Karlsruhe | Futures | Clay | (France) Hugo Daubias | (Germany) Florian Fallert (Germany) Peter Heller | 2–6, 7–6^{(8–6)}, [7–10] |
| Win | 3–1 | Sep 2017 | France F19, Mulhouse | Futures | Hard | (France) Albano Olivetti | (Germany) Johannes Härteis (France) Hugo Voljacques | 6–4, 6–7^{(3–7)}, [10–7] |
| Win | 4–1 | Oct 2017 | Germany F16, Hamburg | Futures | Hard | (Germany) Marvin Möller | (Turkey) Altuğ Çelikbilek (Turkey) Anıl Yüksel | 6–7^{(3–7)}, 7–6^{(7–4)}, [10–2] |
| Win | 5–1 | Jan 2018 | France F3, Veigy-Foncenex | Futures | Carpet | (France) Albano Olivetti | (Netherlands) Antal van der Duim (Netherlands) Tim van Terheijden | 2–6, 7–6^{(7–4)}, [10–8] |
| Win | 6–1 | Mar 2018 | France F4, Toulouse | Futures | Hard | (France) Albano Olivetti | (Netherlands) Igor Sijsling (Netherlands) Botic van de Zandschulp | 6–3, 7–5 |
| Loss | 6–2 | Mar 2018 | France F6, Villers-lès-Nancy | Futures | Hard | (France) Maxime Tchoutakian | (Switzerland) Marc-Andrea Hüsler (France) Hugo Voljacques | 6–7^{(4–7)}, 6–7^{(3–7)} |
| Win | 7–2 | Apr 2018 | Tunisia F14, Jerba | Futures | Hard | (France) Hugo Voljacques | (Sweden) Daniel Appelgren (Germany) Daniel Brands | 6–3, 6–3 |
| Win | 8–2 | Apr 2018 | Tunisia F15, Jerba | Futures | Hard | (France) Hugo Voljacques | (Turkey) Altuğ Çelikbilek (Slovakia) Juraj Masár | 6–1, 6–3 |
| Loss | 8–3 | Jun 2018 | Israel F8, Tel Aviv | Futures | Hard | (France) Albano Olivetti | (Israel) Daniel Cukierman (Israel) Edan Leshem | 4–6, 2–6 |
| Win | 9–3 | Jun 2018 | Israel F9, Netanya | Futures | Hard | (France) Albano Olivetti | (Italy) Francesco Ferrari (Mexico) Tigre Hank | 6–3, 6–4 |
| Win | 10–3 | Jul 2018 | France F12, Bourg-en-Bresse | Futures | Clay | (France) Ugo Humbert | (France) Jérôme Inzerillo (France) Alexis Musialek | 2–6, 6–1, [10–5] |
| Loss | 10–4 | Jul 2018 | France F15, Troyes | Futures | Clay | (France) Hugo Voljacques | (Germany) David Klier (Brazil) Bruno Sant'Anna | 2–6, 2–6 |
| Win | 11–4 | Aug 2018 | Belgium F9, Huy | Futures | Clay | (Belgium) Romain Barbosa | (United States) Luke Jacob Gamble (Northern Mariana Islands) Colin Sinclair | 6–4, 7–5 |
| Loss | 11–5 | Sep 2018 | France F16, Bagnères-de-Bigorre | Futures | Hard | (France) Albano Olivetti | (Belgium) Niels Desein (Belgium) Yannick Mertens | 7–6^{(9–7)}, 5–7, [5–10] |
| Win | 12–5 | Sep 2018 | France F19, Sarreguemines | Futures | Carpet | (France) Albano Olivetti | (Germany) Elmar Ejupovic (Belgium) Michael Geerts | 7–6^{(7–5)}, 6–3 |
| Loss | 12–6 | Oct 2018 | France F20, Nevers | Futures | Hard | (France) Mick Lescure | (France) Matteo Martineau (France) Hugo Voljacques | 7–6^{(10–8)}, 3–6, [5–10] |
| Win | 13–6 | Jan 2019 | M15+H Bressuire, France | World Tennis Tour | Hard | (France) Albano Olivetti | (Czech Republic) Michal Konečný (Czech Republic) Tomáš Macháč | 7–6^{(7–5)}, 6–3 |
| Win | 14–6 | Jan 2019 | M15 Veigy-Foncenex, France | World Tennis Tour | Carpet | (France) Albano Olivetti | (France) Yanais Laurent (France) Maxime Tchoutakian | 6–0, 4–6, [10–7] |
| Loss | 14–7 | Feb 2019 | M15 Grenoble, France | World Tennis Tour | Hard | (France) Hugo Voljacques | (Belgium) Niels Desein (Belgium) Yannick Mertens | 6–7^{(7–9)}, 3–6 |
| Loss | 14–8 | Feb 2019 | M15 Monastir, Tunisia | World Tennis Tour | Hard | (France) Yanais Laurent | (Ecuador) Diego Hidalgo (Tunisia) Skander Mansouri | 5–7, 0–6 |
| Loss | 14–9 | Apr 2019 | M25+H Abuja, Nigeria | World Tennis Tour | Hard | (Greece) Michail Pervolarakis | (France) Sadio Doumbia (France) Fabien Reboul | 4–6, 7–5, [6–10] |
| Win | 15–9 | Apr 2019 | M25+H Abuja, Nigeria | World Tennis Tour | Hard | (Greece) Michail Pervolarakis | (India) Arjun Kadhe (India) Vijay Sundar Prashanth | 6–4, 6–4 |
| Loss | 15–10 | Jun 2019 | M25 Montauban, France | World Tennis Tour | Clay | (Brazil) Thiago Seyboth Wild | (Colombia) Alejandro Gómez (United States) Junior Alexander Ore | 2–6, 2–6 |
| Loss | 15–11 | Jul 2019 | M25 Troyes, France | World Tennis Tour | Clay | (Brazil) Orlando Luz | (France) Joffrey de Schepper (France) Pierre Faivre | 6–2, 4–6, [5–10] |
| Win | 16–11 | Aug 2019 | M15 Koksijde, Belgium | World Tennis Tour | Clay | (Belgium) Zizou Bergs | (Belgium) Romain Barbosa (Belgium) Arnaud Bovy | 6–4, 3–6, [10–3] |
| Loss | 16–12 | Aug 2019 | M15 Lambermont, Belgium | World Tennis Tour | Clay | (Belgium) Arnaud Bovy | (Netherlands) Max Houkes (Netherlands) Colin van Beem | 5–7, 3–6 |
| Win | 17–12 | Sep 2019 | M15 Forbach, France | World Tennis Tour | Carpet | (France) Albano Olivetti | (United Kingdom) Jack Findel-Hawkins (Germany) Lasse Muscheites | 6–3, 6–4 |
| Win | 18–12 | Oct 2019 | M25+H Nevers, France | World Tennis Tour | Hard | (France) Albano Olivetti | (France) Quentin Halys (France) Matteo Martineau | 6–4, 7–5 |
| Win | 19–12 | Oct 2019 | M25+H Rodez, France | World Tennis Tour | Hard | (France) Albano Olivetti | (France) Benjamin Bonzi (France) Grégoire Jacq | 7–5, 6–7^{(1–7)}, [10–4] |
| Loss | 19–13 | Feb 2020 | Cherbourg, France | Challenger | Hard (i) | (France) Albano Olivetti | (Russia) Pavel Kotov (Russia) Roman Safiullin | 6–7^{(6–8)}, 7–5, [10–12] |
| Loss | 19–14 | Oct 2020 | M25 Porto, Portugal | World Tennis Tour | Hard | (France) Sadio Doumbia | (Germany) Fabian Fallert (Germany) Johannes Härteis | 3–6, 6–7^{(5–7)} |
| Loss | 19–15 | Dec 2020 | M15 Monastir, Tunisia | World Tennis Tour | Hard | (Tunisia) Skander Mansouri | (Austria) Alexander Erler (Austria) David Pichler | 6–7^{(7–9)}, 3–6 |
| Loss | 19–16 | Jan 2021 | M15 Manacor, Spain | World Tennis Tour | Hard | (Switzerland) Antoine Bellier | (France) Sadio Doumbia (France) Fabien Reboul | 6–7^{(1–7)}, 1–6 |
| Win | 20–16 | Feb 2021 | M25 Villena, Spain | World Tennis Tour | Hard | (India) Arjun Kadhe | (Spain) Íñigo Cervantes (Netherlands) Mark Vervoort | 6–4, 6–2 |
| Win | 21–16 | Feb 2021 | M25 Vale do Lobo, Portugal | World Tennis Tour | Hard | (Germany) Fabian Fallert | (Russia) Alen Avidzba (Estonia) Kristjan Tamm | 6–2, 6–7^{(4–7)}, [10–2] |
| Loss | 21–17 | Mar 2021 | M25 Faro, Portugal | World Tennis Tour | Hard | (France) Hugo Voljacques | (Turkey) Tuna Altuna (Portugal) Gonçalo Falcão | 3–6, 6–4, [6–10] |
| Loss | 21–18 | Mar 2021 | Lille, France | Challenger | Hard (i) | (Belgium) Michael Geerts | (France) Benjamin Bonzi (France) Antoine Hoang | 3–6, 1–6 |
| Win | 22–18 | May 2021 | M15 Troisdorf, Germany | World Tennis Tour | Clay | (United Kingdom) Luke Johnson | (Argentina) Juan Ignacio Galarza (Argentina) Juan Pablo Paz | 6–4, 6–4 |
| Loss | 23–18 | May 2021 | M15 Šibenik, Croatia | World Tennis Tour | Clay | (Austria) David Pichler | (Argentina) Hernán Casanova (Argentina) Matias Zukas | Walkover |
| Win | 24–18 | Jun 2021 | M25 Grasse, France | World Tennis Tour | Clay | (Switzerland) Leandro Riedi | (Italy) Franco Agamenone (Poland) Piotr Matuszewski | 6–1, 6–4 |
| Win | 25–18 | Sep 2021 | M25 Sintra, Portugal | World Tennis Tour | Hard | (United Kingdom) Evan Hoyt | (Brazil) Mateus Alves (Brazil) Leonardo Civita-Telles | 6–7^{(8–10)}, 6–2, [10–6] |
| Loss | 25–19 | Nov 2021 | M25 Afula, Israel | World Tennis Tour | Hard | (Israel) Daniel Cukierman | (Israel) Lior Goldenberg (Israel) Sahar Simon | 6–7^{(7–9)}, 6–2, [7–10] |
| Loss | 25–20 | Jan 2022 | M25 Monastir, Tunisia | World Tennis Tour | Hard | (France) Clément Tabur | (France) Théo Arribagé (Bulgaria) Alexander Donski | 2–6, 7–5, [7–10] |
| Win | 26–20 | Mar 2022 | M25 Trento, Italy | World Tennis Tour | Hard | (Czech Republic) Andrew Paulson | (Germany) Tim Handel (Switzerland) Yannik Steinegger | 6–4, 3–6, [10–8] |
| Win | 27–20 | May 2022 | Francavilla, Italy | Challenger | Clay | (Argentina) Hernán Casanova | (Italy) Davide Pozzi (Italy) Augusto Virgili | 6–3, 7–5 |
| Win | 28–20 | Jun 2022 | M25 Santo Domingo, DR | World Tennis Tour | Hard | (Brazil) João Lucas Reis da Silva | (United States) Jake Bhangdia (United States) Gabriel Evans | 6–4, 6–3 |
| Loss | 28–21 | Jul 2022 | M25+H Ajaccio, France | World Tennis Tour | Hard | (France) Arthur Bouquier | (United Kingdom) Luke Johnson (United Kingdom) Ben Jones | 2–6, 7–6^{(7–1)}, [8–10] |
| Win | 29–21 | Jul 2022 | Pozoblanco, Spain | Challenger | Hard | (France) Albano Olivetti | (Romania) Victor Vlad Cornea (Venezuela) Luis David Martínez | 3–6, 6–1, [12–10] |
| Loss | 29–22 | Sep 2022 | Rennes, France | Challenger | Hard (i) | (France) Albano Olivetti | (France) Jonathan Eysseric (Netherlands) David Pel | 4–6, 4–6 |
| Win | 30–22 | Oct 2022 | Saint Tropez, France | Challenger | Hard | (France) Albano Olivetti | (Monaco) Romain Arneodo (Austria) Tristan-Samuel Weissborn | 6–3, 3–6, [12–10] |
| Loss | 30–23 | Oct 2022 | Vilnius, Lithuania | Challenger | Hard (i) | (France) Théo Arribagé | (Monaco) Romain Arneodo (Austria) Tristan-Samuel Weissborn | 4–6, 7–5, [5–10] |
| Win | 31–23 | Jan 2023 | M25 Monastir, Tunisia | World Tennis Tour | Hard | (France) Luca Sanchez | (Italy) Enrico Dalla Valle (Italy) Francesco Forti | 6–4, 7–6^{(7–5)} |
| Win | 32–23 | Feb 2023 | Pau, France | Challenger | Hard (i) | (France) Albano Olivetti | (United Kingdom) Julian Cash (Germany) Constantin Frantzen | 3–6, 6–1, [10–8] |
| Win | 33–23 | Mar 2023 | Saint Brieuc, France | Challenger | Hard (i) | (France) Albano Olivetti | (Finland) Patrik Niklas-Salminen (Netherlands) Bart Stevens | 4-6, 7-6^{(9–7)}, [10–7] |
| Win | 34–23 | Apr 2023 | Roseto degli Abruzzi, Italy | Challenger | Clay | (France) Titouan Droguet | (Italy) Jacopo Berrettini (Italy) Andrea Pellegrino | 6–2, 1–6, [12–10] |
| Win | 35–23 | May 2023 | Prague, Czech Republic | Challenger | Clay | (France) Albano Olivetti | (Latvia) Miķelis Lībietis (United States) Hunter Reese | 6–4, 6–3 |
| Win | 36–23 | Jun 2023 | Blois, France | Challenger | Clay | (France) Gregoire Jacq | (France) Théo Arribagé (France) Luca Sanchez | 6–4, 6–4 |
| Win | 37–23 | Jul 2023 | Segovia, Spain | Challenger | Hard | (France) Pierre-Hugues Herbert | (Philippines) Francis Casey Alcantara (China) Fajing Sun | 4–6, 6–3, [12–10] |
| Win | 38–23 | Aug 2023 | M25 Idanha-a-Nova, Portugal | World Tennis Tour | Hard | (Tunisia) Skander Mansouri | (Spain) Alberto Barroso Campos (Czech Republic) David Poljak | 7–5, 6–4 |
| Win | 39–23 | Sep 2023 | Cassis, France | Challenger | Hard | (France) Jonathan Eysseric | (France) Antoine Hoang (United Kingdom) Liam Broady | 6–0, 4–6, [11–9] |
| Win | 40–23 | Sep 2023 | Saint-Tropez, France | Challenger | Hard | (France) Albano Olivetti | (France) Jonathan Eysseric (France) Harold Mayot | 3–6, 1–0 Ret. |
| Loss | 40–24 | Oct 2023 | M25 Mulhouse, France | World Tennis Tour | Hard | (France) Arthur Bouquier | (France) Yanis Ghazouani Durand (France) Loann Massard | 2–3 Ret. |
| Loss | 40–25 | Jan 2024 | M25 Sunderland, Great Britain | World Tennis Tour | Hard | (France) Clément Chidekh | (United Kingdom) David Stevenson (United Kingdom) Marcus Willis | 6–4, 6–7^{(6–8)}, [8–10] |
| Loss | 40–26 | Feb 2024 | Pune, India | Challenger | Hard | (South Korea) Chung Yun-seong | (Australia) Tristan Schoolkate (Australia) Adam Walton | 6–7^{(4–7)}, 5–7 |
| Loss | 40–27 | Mar 2024 | M25 Loule, Portugal | World Tennis Tour | Hard | (Czech Republic) Jakub Nicod | (Bulgaria) Alexander Donski (Portugal) Tiago Pereira | 6–7^{(6–8)}, 6–2, [1–10] |
| Win | 41–27 | Apr 2024 | M25 Angers, France | World Tennis Tour | Clay | (France) Constantin Bittoun Kouzmine | (France) Arthur Nagel (Italy) Filippo Romano | 6–4, 5–7, [11–9] |
| Loss | 41–28 | Jun 2024 | M25 Villeneuve-Loubet, France | World Tennis Tour | Clay | (France) Arthur Reymond | (Switzerland) Remy Bertola (Switzerland) Jakub Paul | 6–3, 6–7^{(3–7)}, [12–14] |
| Loss | 41–29 | Jun 2024 | M25 Montauban, France | World Tennis Tour | Clay | (France) Arthur Reymond | (Switzerland) Johan Nikles (Switzerland) Damien Wenger | 6–7^{(1–7)}, 6–7^{(3–7)} |
| Loss | 41–30 | Jul 2024 | Karlsruhe, Germany | Challenger | Clay | (France) Grégoire Jacq | (Germany) Jakob Schnaitter (Germany) Mark Wallner | 4–6, 0–6 |
| Win | 42–30 | Jul 2024 | Pozoblanco, Spain | Challenger | Hard | (France) Arthur Reymond | (United Kingdom) Liam Hignett (United Kingdom) James MacKinlay | 6–2, 6–4 |
| Win | 43–30 | Jul 2024 | Segovia, Spain | Challenger | Hard | (France) Arthur Reymond | (Bulgaria) Alexander Donski (Portugal) Tiago Pereira | 6–4, 6–3 |
| Loss | 43–31 | Aug 2024 | M25 Idanha-a-Nova, Portugal | World Tennis Tour | Hard | (Luxembourg) Alex Knaff | (Spain) Rafael Izquierdo Luque (Spain) Iván Marrero Curbelo | 2–6, 3–6 |
| Loss | 43–32 | Oct 2024 | M25 Sarreguemines, France | World Tennis Tour | Carpet (i) | (France) Arthur Nagel | (France) Axel Garcian (France) Arthur Bouquier | 2–6, 3–6 |
| Win | 44–32 | Jan 2025 | M25 Hazebrouck, France | World Tennis Tour | Hard (i) | (France) Arthur Bouquier | (Bulgaria) Anthony Genov (Poland) Szymon Kielan | 6–1, 6–0 |
| Win | 45–32 | Feb 2025 | M25 Trento, Italy | World Tennis Tour | Hard (i) | (Czech Republic) Jan Jermář | (Croatia) Admir Kalender (Croatia) Nino Serdarušić | 6–4, 6–4 |
| Win | 46–32 | Mar 2025 | M25 Toulouse–Balma, France | World Tennis Tour | Hard (i) | (France) Arthur Reymond | (Czech Republic) David Poljak; Marat Sharipov | Walkover |
| Win | 47–32 | Mar 2025 | M25 Saint-Dizier, France | World Tennis Tour | Hard (i) | (Czech Republic) Jan Jermář | (United Kingdom) Tom Hands (United Kingdom) Harry Wendelken | Walkover |
| Win | 48–32 | May 2025 | M25 Bol, Croatia | World Tennis Tour | Clay | (Croatia) Nino Serdarušić | (Spain) Alberto Barroso Campos (Portugal) Tiago Pereira | 6–1, 6–4 |
| Win | 49–32 | Jun 2025 | M25 Grasse, France | World Tennis Tour | Clay | (France) Arthur Reymond | (Italy) Simone Agostini (India) Parikshit Somani | 6–1, 6–4 |
| Loss | 49–33 | Jun 2025 | M25 Elvas, Portugal | World Tennis Tour | Hard | (Estonia) Johannes Seeman | (United Kingdom) Liam Broady (United Kingdom) Charlie Robertson | 5–7, 2–6 |
| Win | 50–33 | Aug 2025 | M25 Monastir, Tunisia | World Tennis Tour | Hard | (Slovakia) Lukáš Pokorný | (United States) Sekou Bangoura (Ghana) Isaac Nortey | 6–2, 7–5 |
| Loss | 50–34 | Aug 2025 | Hersonissos III, Greece | Challenger | Hard | (France) Arthur Reymond | (Italy) Filippo Moroni (United Kingdom) Stuart Parker | 4-6, 4-6 |
| Loss | 50–35 | Jan 2026 | Quimper, France | Challenger | Hard | (France) Arthur Bouquier | (France) Arthur Reymond (France) Luca Sanchez | 6-7^{(7–9)}, 6-3, [3–10] |
| Loss | 50–36 | Jul 2026 | Samsun, Turkey | Challenger | Hard | (France) Gabriel Debru | (United States) Christopher Papa (China) Zheng Baoluo | 4–6, 7–6^{(7–2)}, [11–13] |
| Win | 51–36 | Sep 2026 | Cassis, France | Challenger | Hard | (Germany) Daniel Masur | (United Kingdom) Tom Hands (United Kingdom) Matthew Summers | 6–4, 6–2 |
