= Harold Mayot =

French tennis player

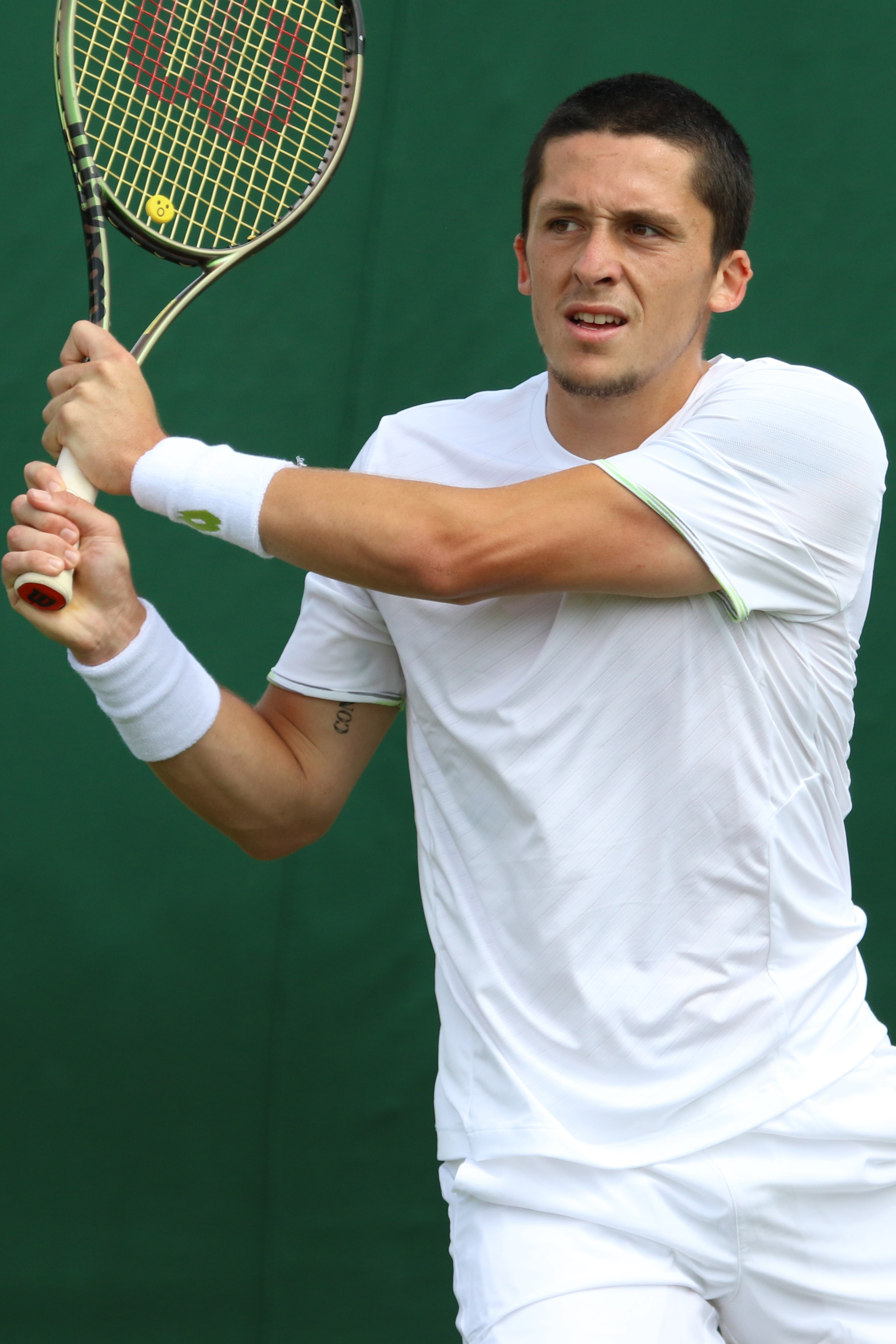
- Mayot at the 2023 Wimbledon Championships
- Country (sports): France
- Residence: Marly, France
- Born: 4 February 2002 (age 24) Metz, France
- Height: 1.80 m (5 ft 11 in)
- Turned pro: 2020
- Plays: Right-handed (two-handed backhand)
- Coach: Thierry Tulasne
- Prize money: US $ 1,246,210

Singles
- Career record: 8–17 (at ATP Tour level, Grand Slam level, and in Davis Cup)
- Career titles: 0
- Highest ranking: No. 103 (14 October 2024)
- Current ranking: No. 201 (22 June 2026)

Grand Slam singles results
- Australian Open: Q3 (2024)
- French Open: 1R (2020, 2024)
- Wimbledon: 2R (2023)
- US Open: Q2 (2024, 2025)

Doubles
- Career record: 2-6 (at ATP Tour level, Grand Slam level, and in Davis Cup)
- Career titles: 0
- Highest ranking: No. 255 (16 September 2024)
- Current ranking: No. 502 (22 June 2026)

Grand Slam doubles results
- French Open: 2R (2023, 2025)

Grand Slam mixed doubles results
- French Open: 2R (2025)
- Last updated on: 22 June 2026.

Harold Mayot (born 4 February 2002) is a French professional tennis player. He has a career high ATP singles ranking of world No. 103 achieved on 14 October 2024. He also has a career high ATP doubles ranking of world No. 255 achieved on 16 September 2024.

== Junior career ==
As a junior, Mayot reached his highest ranking of number 1 in the world in the combined singles and doubles ITF junior ranking system, which he reached on 3 February 2020 and sustained to end the year as the number one male juniors player in the world. This was highlighted by a winning the championship at the 2020 Australian Open where he defeated compatriot Arthur Cazaux in straight sets 6–4, 6–1.

== Professional career ==
=== 2020: Grand Slam singles and doubles debut ===
Mayot made his ATP main draw debut at the 2020 Open 13 simultaneously in both single and doubles when he was granted a wildcard entry into both draws partnering compatriot Arthur Cazaux. They were defeated in the first round by Nicolas Mahut and Vasek Pospisil in straight sets. In singles, he was also defeated in the first round by veteran compatriot Gilles Simon in straight sets.

Pairing with Cazaux again, they were given a wildcard entry into the main doubles draw of the 2020 French Open but would again be defeated in the first round by Łukasz Kubot and Marcelo Melo in straight sets. At the same tournament Mayot received also a wildcard into the singles main draw, and was defeated by Alejandro Davidovich Fokina.

=== 2022: First ATP Challenger final ===
Mayot received a wildcard for the qualifying competition at the 2022 Australian Open. In July, Mayot reached his first ATP Challenger Tour final as a qualifier at the 2022 Tampere Open in Finland, losing against Zsombor Piros. As a result, he reached a new career-high singles ranking of No. 304 and also a doubles ranking of No. 450 on 25 July 2022. He reached the top 250 at world No. 248 on 19 September 2022.

=== 2023: Wimbledon debut, ATP quarterfinal ===
Following a semifinal showing at the 2023 Open Aix Provence as a lucky loser where he beat three top 100 players then lost to fifth seed Andy Murray, he reached the top 200 in the rankings on 8 May 2023.

In June, Mayot won his first doubles match at the 2023 French Open partnering with Jonathan Eysseric, having failed to qualify in the singles. In July, Mayot made his Wimbledon debut as a qualifier, only his second career Major singles appearance., where he recorded his first singles Grand Slam win by beating fellow countryman Benjamin Bonzi in the first round. He later made his debut at the US Open qualifying, where he lost in the first round.

In September, Mayot reached his second career final on the ATP Challenger Tour in Mallorca losing to second seed Hamad Medjedovic in the final. Later in September, Mayot reached his first doubles final on the ATP Challenger Tour in Saint-Tropez partnering with Jonathan Eysseric, losing in the final to Dan Added and Albano Olivetti.

In November, ranked No. 176, Mayot qualified at his home tournament in Metz, France. He reached the main draw as a qualifier where he defeated Yosuke Watanuki in the first round and Grégoire Barrère in the second to reach his first quarterfinal on the ATP Tour. He lost to fourth seed Ugo Humbert in the quarterfinals.

=== 2024: Italian Open debut, top 200 ===
Following the 2024 Australian Open where he made it to the third round of qualifying for the first time at this Major, he reached the top 150 at No. 144 on 29 January 2024. At the 2024 Open Sud de France, he reached the quarterfinals defeating two compatriots Lucas Pouille and Benoît Paire.

He made his Masters debut at the 2024 Miami Open after qualifying into the main draw with wins over Arthur Cazaux by retirement and David Goffin.

In April, as the top seed Mayot reached the final of the Challenger tournament in Barletta, Italy, defeating Jacopo Berrettini before losing to second seed Damir Džumhur in the final. As a result, he reached the top 120 in the rankings on 8 April 2024.

He qualified for his first ATP 500 tournament at the 2024 Barcelona Open Banc Sabadell. He also entered the 2024 Italian Open as a lucky loser.

In June, Mayot reached his first Challenger final on grass in Ilkley, losing to fourth seed David Goffin in the final. In September, he reached his fifth Challenger final in Orléans, losing to Jacob Fearnley in the final.

=== 2025: First ATP 1000 win ===
In April, Mayot won his first ATP 1000 match in Madrid, entering the main draw as a qualifier. In the first round, he defeated fellow countryman Corentin Moutet. He lost in the second round to Francisco Cerúndolo.

In July, Mayot reached the final in both the single and doubles tournament at the Zug Open, partnering with Geoffrey Blancaneaux in doubles. He lost to Lukáš Klein in the single final. The doubles final was cancelled because of weather.

In October, Mayot reached his seventh career Challenger final at the Suzhou Open, losing to top seed Yoshihito Nishioka in the final.

=== 2026: Back-to-back Challenger finals ===
In September, Mayot reached back-to-back Challenger finals, first at the Open de Rennes, where he lost in the final to Sascha Gueymard Wayenburg. The following week, he reached the final at the Saint-Tropez Open, losing to top seed Titouan Droguet in the final. He returned in the top 200 as a result.

== Performance timelines ==
Key
W	F	SF	QF	#R	RR	Q#	DNQ	A	NH

(W) winner; (F) finalist; (SF) semifinalist; (QF) quarterfinalist; (#R) rounds 4, 3, 2, 1; (RR) round-robin stage; (Q#) qualification round; (DNQ) did not qualify; (A) absent; (NH) not held; (SR) strike rate (events won / competed); (W–L) win–loss record.
To avoid confusion and double counting, these charts are updated at the conclusion of a tournament or when the player's participation has ended.

=== Singles ===
Tournament	2020	2021	2022	2023	2024	2025	2026	SR	W–L	Win %
Grand Slam tournaments
Australian Open	A	A	Q1	A	Q3	Q1	Q1	0 / 0	0–0	–
French Open	1R	A	A	Q1	1R	Q1	Q1	0 / 2	0–2	0%
Wimbledon	NH	A	A	2R	Q1	Q1	Q2	0 / 1	1–1	50%
US Open	A	A	A	Q1	Q2	Q2	A	0 / 0	0–0	–
Win–loss	0–1	0–0	0–0	1–1	0–1	0–0	0–0	0 / 3	1–3	25%
ATP Masters 1000
Indian Wells Open	A	A	A	A	Q2	A	A	0 / 0	0–0	–
Miami Open	A	A	A	A	1R	A	A	0 / 1	0–1	0%
Madrid Open	A	A	A	A	A	2R	A	0 / 1	1–1	50%
Italian Open	A	A	A	A	1R	Q1	A	0 / 1	0–1	0%
Canadian Open	A	A	A	A	A	A	A	0 / 0	0–0	–
Cincinnati Open	A	A	A	A	A	A	A	0 / 0	0–0	–
Shanghai Masters	A	A	A	A	A	Q2		0 / 0	0–0	–
Paris Masters	A	A	A	A	Q1	A		0 / 0	0–0	–
Win–loss	0–0	0–0	0–0	0–0	0–2	1–1	0–0	0 / 3	1–3	25%

=== Doubles ===
Tournament	2020	2021	2022	2023	2024	2025	2026	SR	W–L	Win %
Australian Open	A	A	A	A	A	A	A	0 / 0	0–0	–
French Open	1R	A	A	2R	A	2R	A	0 / 3	2–3	40%
Wimbledon	NH	A	A	A	A	A	A	0 / 0	0–0	–
US Open	A	A	A	A	A	A	A	0 / 0	0–0	–
Win–loss	0–1	0–0	0–0	1–1	0–0	1–1	0–0	0 / 3	2–3	40%

== ATP Challenger Tour finals ==
=== Singles: 9 (9 runner-ups) ===
Legend ATP Challenger Tour (0–9)	Finals by surface Hard (0–5) Clay (0–3) Grass (0–1) Carpet (0–0)

Result	W–L	Date	Tournament	Tier	Surface	Opponent	Score
Loss	0–1	Jul 2022	Tampere, Finland	Challenger	Clay	(Hungary) Zsombor Piros	2–6, 6–1, 4–6
Loss	0–2	Sep 2023	Manacor, Spain	Challenger	Hard	(Serbia) Hamad Medjedovic	2–6, 6–4, 2–6
Loss	0–3	Apr 2024	Barletta, Italy	Challenger	Clay	(Bosnia and Herzegovina) Damir Džumhur	1–6, 3–6
Loss	0–4	Jun 2024	Ilkley, United Kingdom	Challenger	Grass	(Belgium) David Goffin	4–6, 2–6
Loss	0–5	Sep 2024	Orléans, France	Challenger	Hard (i)	(United Kingdom) Jacob Fearnley	3–6, 6–7^{(5–7)}
Loss	0–6	Jul 2025	Zug, Switzerland	Challenger	Clay	(Slovakia) Lukáš Klein	2–6, 7–6^{(7–4)}, 4–6
Loss	0–7	Oct 2025	Suzhou, China	Challenger	Hard	(Japan) Yoshihito Nishioka	4–6, 4–6
Loss	0–8	Sep 2026	Rennes, France	Challenger	Hard (i)	(France) Sascha Gueymard Wayenburg	6–4, 3–6, 5–7
Loss	0–9	Sep 2026	Saint-Tropez, France	Challenger	Hard	(France) Titouan Droguet	3–6, 5–7

=== Doubles: 3 (2 runner-ups, 1 non-complete) ===
Legend ATP Challenger Tour (0–2)

Result	W–L	Date	Tournament	Tier	Surface	Partner	Opponents	Score
Loss	0–1	Sep 2023	Saint-Tropez, France	Challenger	Hard	(France) Jonathan Eysseric	(France) Dan Added (France) Albano Olivetti	6–3, 0–1 Ret.
Loss	0–2	Jun 2024	Nottingham, United Kingdom	Challenger	Grass	(Australia) Luke Saville	(Australia) John Peers (United Kingdom) Marcus Willis	1–6, 7–6^{(7–1)}, [7–10]
Not completed	0–2	Jul 2025	Zug, Switzerland	Challenger	Clay	(France) Geoffrey Blancaneaux	(South Korea) Nam Ji-sung (Japan) Takeru Yuzuki	x–x, x–x

== ITF World Tennis Tour finals ==
=== Singles: 4 (2 titles, 2 runner-ups) ===
Legend ITF WTT (2–2)	Finals by surface Hard (2–1) Clay (0–0) Grass (0–0) Carpet (0–1)

Result	W–L	Date	Tournament	Tier	Surface	Opponent	Score
Loss	0–1	Sep 2019	M15 Forbach, France	WTT	Carpet	(Germany) Elmar Ejupovic	4–6, 6–4, 3–6
Loss	0–2	Nov 2019	M25 Saint-Dizier, France	WTT	Hard	(France) Hugo Grenier	1–6, 5–7
Win	1–2	Nov 2019	M15 Villers-lès-Nancy, France	WTT	Hard	(France) Ronan Joncour	6–4, 6–2
Win	2–2	Jan 2022	M25 Monastir, Tunisia	WTT	Hard	(South Korea) Chung Yun-seong	6–4, 0–6, 6–4

=== Doubles: 3 (2 titles, 1 runner-up) ===
Legend ITF WTT (2–1)

Result	W–L	Date	Tournament	Tier	Surface	Partner	Opponents	Score
Win	1–0	Nov 2019	M25 Saint-Dizier, France	WTT	Hard	(France) Antoine Cornut-Chauvinc	(France) Benjamin Bonzi (France) Corentin Denolly	6–4, 0–6, [10–8]
Loss	1–1	Sep 2020	M15 Caslano, Switzerland	WTT	Clay	(France) Antoine Cornut-Chauvinc	(Austria) David Pichler (Austria) Alexander Erler	5–7, 4–6
Win	2–1	Aug 2023	M25 Lesa, Italy	WTT	Clay	(Italy) Alessandro Bega	(Italy) Pietro Rondoni (Italy) Andrea Basso	6–3, 6–1

== Junior Grand Slam finals ==
=== Singles: 1 (1 title) ===
Result	Year	Tournament	Surface	Opponent	Score
Win	2020	Australian Open	Hard	(France) Arthur Cazaux	6–4, 6–1
