= Saint-Tropez Open =

- 2025 Saint-Tropez Open

ATP Challenger Tour
- Event name: Saint-Tropez Open
- Location: Saint-Tropez, France
- Venue: Pierre PHILIPPOT Municipal Tennis Center
- Category: ATP Challenger Tour 125
- Surface: Hard
- Draw: 32S/32Q/16D
- Prize money: €181,250 (2025), €148,625 (2024)
- Website: Website

The Saint-Tropez Open is a professional tennis tournament played on hardcourts. It is currently part of the ATP Challenger Tour. It is held annually in Saint-Tropez, France since 2021.

== Past finals ==
=== Singles ===
Year	Champion	Runner-up	Score
2026	(France) Titouan Droguet	(France) Harold Mayot	6–3, 7–5
2025	(Tunisia) Moez Echargui	(France) Dan Added	6–3, 6–4
2024	(Netherlands) Gijs Brouwer	(France) Lucas Pouille	6–4, 7–6^{(7–2)}
2023	(France) Constant Lestienne	(United Kingdom) Liam Broady	4–6, 6–3, 6–4
2022	(Italy) Mattia Bellucci	(Italy) Matteo Arnaldi	6–3, 6–3
2021	(France) Benjamin Bonzi	(Australia) Christopher O'Connell	6–7^{(10–12)}, 6–1, 0–0 ret.

=== Doubles ===
Year	Champions	Runners-up	Score
2026	(Switzerland) Jakub Paul (Czech Republic) Matěj Vocel	(France) Constantin Bittoun Kouzmine (Germany) Daniel Masur	6–4, 6–3
2025	(United States) Trey Hilderbrand (United States) Mac Kiger	(Finland) Patrik Niklas-Salminen (Czech Republic) Matěj Vocel	7–6^{(7–5)}, 7–5
2024	(Netherlands) Sander Arends (United Kingdom) Luke Johnson	(Sweden) André Göransson (Netherlands) Sem Verbeek	3–6, 6–3, [10–4]
2023	(France) Dan Added (France) Albano Olivetti	(France) Jonathan Eysseric (France) Harold Mayot	3–6, 1–0 ret.
2022	(France) Dan Added (France) Albano Olivetti	(Monaco) Romain Arneodo (Austria) Tristan-Samuel Weissborn	6–3, 3–6, [12–10]
2021	(Croatia) Antonio Šančić (New Zealand) Artem Sitak	(Monaco) Romain Arneodo (France) Manuel Guinard	7–6^{(7–5)}, 6–4
