= 2025 Lexus Nottingham Challenger II =

- Date: 7–13 July
- Edition: 3rd
- Surface: Grass
- Location: Nottingham, United Kingdom

Champions

Singles
- (United Kingdom) Jack Pinnington Jones

Doubles
- (United Kingdom) Scott Duncan / (United Kingdom) James MacKinlay
- Lexus Nottingham Challenger

The 2025 Lexus Nottingham Challenger II was a professional tennis tournament played on grass courts. It was the third edition of the tournament which was part of the 2025 ATP Challenger Tour. It took place in Nottingham, United Kingdom between 7 and 13 July 2025.

== Singles main-draw entrants ==
=== Seeds ===
Country	Player	Rank^{1}	Seed
FRA	Hugo Grenier	175	1
GBR	Johannus Monday	224	2
GBR	Oliver Crawford	248	3
GBR	Ryan Peniston	263	4
GBR	Jack Pinnington Jones	281	5
FRA	Matteo Martineau	292	6
GBR	George Loffhagen	293	7
GBR	Alastair Gray	374	8

- ^{1} Rankings are as of 30 June 2025.

=== Other entrants ===
The following players received wildcards into the singles main draw:

- (United Kingdom) Ben Jones
- (United Kingdom) Charlie Robertson
- (United Kingdom) Connor Thomson

The following player received entry into the singles main draw as an alternate:

- Ilya Ivashka

The following players received entry from the qualifying draw:

- (United Kingdom) Patrick Brady
- (Norway) Nicolai Budkov Kjær
- (United Kingdom) Tom Hands
- (United Kingdom) Lui Maxted
- (United States) Axel Nefve
- (Germany) Patrick Zahraj

== Champions ==
=== Singles ===
- (United Kingdom) Jack Pinnington Jones def. (United Kingdom) Kyle Edmund 6–4, 7–6^{(7–1)}.

=== Doubles ===
- (United Kingdom) Scott Duncan / (United Kingdom) James MacKinlay def. (United Kingdom) Charles Broom / (United Kingdom) Mark Whitehouse 7–5, 4–6, [20–18].
