= 2025 Lexus Nottingham Challenger II – Singles =

Singles
- 2025 Lexus Nottingham Challenger II

Final
- Champion: (United Kingdom) Jack Pinnington Jones
- Runner-up: (United Kingdom) Kyle Edmund
- Score: 6–4, 7–6^{(7–1)}

Events
Singles	Doubles
- Lexus Nottingham Challenger

Viktor Durasovic was the defending champion but chose not to defend his title.

Jack Pinnington Jones won the title after defeating Kyle Edmund 6–4, 7–6^{(7–1)} in the final.

== Seeds ==
1. (France) Hugo Grenier (first round)
2. (United Kingdom) Johannus Monday (first round)
3. (United Kingdom) Oliver Crawford (semifinals)
4. (United Kingdom) Ryan Peniston (quarterfinals)
5. (United Kingdom) Jack Pinnington Jones (champion)
6. (France) Matteo Martineau (first round)
7. (United Kingdom) George Loffhagen (second round)
8. (United Kingdom) Alastair Gray (quarterfinals)

== Draw ==
Key

- Q = Qualifier
- WC = Wild card
- LL = Lucky loser
- Alt = Alternate
- ITF = ITF entry
- PR = Protected ranking
- SR = Special ranking
- SE = Special exempt
- JE = Junior exempt
- JR = Junior Accelerator Programme entrant
- CO = College Accelerator Programme entrant
- NG = Next Gen Accelerator Program entrant
- w/o = Walkover
- r = Retired
- d = Defaulted

=== Finals ===
Semifinals
(United Kingdom) Kyle Edmund	6	6
(United Kingdom) Hamish Stewart	1	4
3	(United Kingdom) Oliver Crawford	4	4
5	(United Kingdom) Jack Pinnington Jones	6	6

Final
(United Kingdom) Kyle Edmund	4	6^{1}
5	(United Kingdom) Jack Pinnington Jones	6	7^{7}

=== Top half ===
First round
1	(France) H Grenier	6^{5}	4
(United Kingdom) L Broady	7^{7}	6
(United Kingdom) K Edmund	6	6
Q	(United Kingdom) T Hands	4	4
Q	(United States) Axel Nefve	4	4
Q	(Germany) P Zahraj	6	6
(France) K de Schepper	7^{7}	7^{9}
6	(France) M Martineau	6^{5}	6^{7}
4	(United Kingdom) R Peniston	6	6
WC	(United Kingdom) B Jones	4	3
(Morocco) T Baadi	2	2
(United Kingdom) H Searle	6	6
(United Kingdom) H Stewart	7^{7}	6
(United Kingdom) M Summers	6^{2}	4
WC	(United Kingdom) Charlie Robertson	2	1
7	(United Kingdom) G Loffhagen	6	6

Second round
(United Kingdom) L Broady	6^{1}	2
(United Kingdom) K Edmund	7^{7}	6
Q	(Germany) P Zahraj	6	6
(France) K de Schepper	3	2
4	(United Kingdom) R Peniston	4	6	6
(United Kingdom) H Searle	6	1	2
(United Kingdom) H Stewart	6	6
7	(United Kingdom) G Loffhagen	3	4

Quarterfinals
(United Kingdom) K Edmund	7^{7}	4
Q	(Germany) P Zahraj	6^{4}	3^{r}
4	(United Kingdom) R Peniston	6	6^{5}	4
(United Kingdom) H Stewart	3	7^{7}	6

Semifinals
(United Kingdom) K Edmund	6	6
(United Kingdom) H Stewart	1	4

=== Bottom half ===
First round
8	(United Kingdom) A Gray	6	5	7
(France) M Janvier	3	7	5
(Italy) Leonardo Rossi	4	2
Q	(United Kingdom) L Maxted	6	6
(France) A Reymond	7	4	4
Alt	I Ivashka	5	6	6
(United Kingdom) C Broom	5	3
3	(United Kingdom) O Crawford	7	6
5	(United Kingdom) J Pinnington Jones	6	6
Q	(Norway) N Budkov Kjær	3	2
Q	(United Kingdom) Patrick Brady	3	1
(United Kingdom) H Wendelken	6	6
WC	(United Kingdom) C Thomson	3	6	7^{7}
(United Kingdom) James Story	6	4	6^{4}
(Australia) E Winter	2	7^{8}	6
2	(United Kingdom) J Monday	6	6^{6}	2

Second round
8	(United Kingdom) A Gray	w/o
Q	(United Kingdom) L Maxted
Alt	I Ivashka	0	3
3	(United Kingdom) O Crawford	6	6
5	(United Kingdom) J Pinnington Jones	6	4	6
(United Kingdom) H Wendelken	4	6	3
WC	(United Kingdom) C Thomson	4	1
(Australia) E Winter	6	6

Quarterfinals
8	(United Kingdom) A Gray	7^{8}	6^{5}	3
3	(United Kingdom) O Crawford	6^{6}	7^{7}	6
5	(United Kingdom) J Pinnington Jones	6^{6}	6	6
(Australia) E Winter	7^{8}	3	4

Semifinals
3	(United Kingdom) O Crawford	4	4
5	(United Kingdom) J Pinnington Jones	6	6
