= 2025 Lexus Nottingham Challenger – Doubles =

Doubles
- 2025 Lexus Nottingham Challenger

Final
- Champions: (Czech Republic) Jonáš Forejtek (Czech Republic) Michael Vrbenský
- Runners-up: (Czech Republic) Jiří Barnat (Czech Republic) Filip Duda
- Score: 7–6^{(7–5)}, 7–6^{(7–5)}

Events
Singles	Doubles
- Lexus Nottingham Challenger

Petr Nouza and Patrik Rikl were the defending champions but chose not to defend their title.

Jonáš Forejtek and Michael Vrbenský won the title after defeating Jiří Barnat and Filip Duda 7–6^{(7–5)}, 7–6^{(7–5)} in the final.

== Seeds ==
1. (Slovakia) Miloš Karol / (Poland) Szymon Walków (first round)
2. (United States) Mac Kiger / (New Zealand) Finn Reynolds (semifinals)
3. (Czech Republic) Jiří Barnat / (Czech Republic) Filip Duda (final)
4. (United Kingdom) Scott Duncan / (United Kingdom) James MacKinlay (first round)

== Draw ==
Key

- Q = Qualifier
- WC = Wild card
- LL = Lucky loser
- Alt = Alternate
- ITF = ITF entry
- PR = Protected ranking
- SR = Special ranking
- SE = Special exempt
- JE = Junior exempt
- JR = Junior Accelerator Programme entrant
- CO = College Accelerator Programme entrant
- NG = Next Gen Accelerator Program entrant
- w/o = Walkover
- r = Retired
- d = Defaulted

=== Draw ===
First round
1	(Slovakia) M Karol (Poland) S Walków	6	3	[8]
(Croatia) L Mikrut (Austria) F Misolic	2	6	[10]
WC	(United Kingdom) L Broady (United Kingdom) H Searle	4	6^{5}
(United Kingdom) B Jones (United Kingdom) J Monday	6	7^{7}
4	(United Kingdom) S Duncan (United Kingdom) J MacKinlay	3	4
(Slovakia) L Pokorný (Germany) T Rühl	6	6
(Netherlands) Ryan Nijboer (Germany) P Zahraj	6	3	[4]
(Czech Republic) J Forejtek (Czech Republic) M Vrbenský	4	6	[10]
(United Kingdom) J Clarke (Belgium) M Geerts	3	6^{2}
(United Kingdom) T Hands (United Kingdom) H Wendelken	6	7^{7}
(Netherlands) M Hermans (Austria) S Kopp	6^{4}	3
3	(Czech Republic) Jiří Barnat (Czech Republic) F Duda	7^{7}	6
WC	(United Kingdom) L Maxted (United Kingdom) Charlie Robertson	6	6
(Luxembourg) C Rodesch (Netherlands) M Veldheer	3	4
(Lithuania) E Butvilas (Croatia) M Poljičak	3	6	[5]
2	(United States) M Kiger (New Zealand) F Reynolds	6	2	[10]

Quarterfinals
(Croatia) L Mikrut (Austria) F Misolic	7^{7}	7
(United Kingdom) B Jones (United Kingdom) J Monday	6^{5}	5
(Slovakia) L Pokorný (Germany) T Rühl	4	4
(Czech Republic) J Forejtek (Czech Republic) M Vrbenský	6	6
(United Kingdom) T Hands (United Kingdom) H Wendelken	7^{9}	2	[14]
3	(Czech Republic) J Barnat (Czech Republic) F Duda	6^{7}	6	[16]
WC	(United Kingdom) L Maxted (United Kingdom) C Robertson	6^{0}	7	[8]
2	(United States) M Kiger (New Zealand) F Reynolds	7^{7}	5	[10]

Semifinals
(Croatia) L Mikrut (Austria) F Misolic	7^{7}	1	[5]
(Czech Republic) J Forejtek (Czech Republic) M Vrbenský	6^{3}	6	[10]
3	(Czech Republic) J Barnat (Czech Republic) F Duda	4	7^{8}	[10]
2	(United States) M Kiger (New Zealand) F Reynolds	6	6^{6}	[8]

Final
(Czech Republic) J Forejtek (Czech Republic) M Vrbenský	7^{7}	7^{7}
3	(Czech Republic) J Barnat (Czech Republic) F Duda	6^{5}	6^{5}
