= 2024 Lexus Nottingham Challenger – Singles =

Singles
- 2024 Lexus Nottingham Challenger

Final
- Champion: (France) Giovanni Mpetshi Perricard
- Runner-up: (France) Matteo Martineau
- Score: 7–6^{(7–2)}, 6–4

Events
Singles	Doubles
Lexus Nottingham Challenger	· 2025 →

This was the first edition of the tournament.

Giovanni Mpetshi Perricard won the title after defeating Matteo Martineau 7–6^{(7–2)}, 6–4 in the final.

== Seeds ==
1. (United Kingdom) Jan Choinski (first round)
2. (France) Antoine Escoffier (first round)
3. (Czech Republic) Zdeněk Kolář (quarterfinals)
4. (Jordan) Abdullah Shelbayh (quarterfinals)
5. (Switzerland) Alexander Ritschard (second round)
6. (United Kingdom) Ryan Peniston (first round)
7. (Belgium) Joris De Loore (second round)
8. (United Kingdom) Billy Harris (second round)

== Draw ==
=== Key ===
- Q = Qualifier
- WC = Wild card
- LL = Lucky loser
- Alt = Alternate
- ITF = ITF entry
- PR = Protected ranking
- SR = Special ranking
- SE = Special exempt
- JE = Junior exempt
- JR = Junior Accelerator Programme entrant
- CO = College Accelerator Programme entrant
- NG = Next Gen Accelerator Program entrant
- w/o = Walkover
- r = Retired
- d = Defaulted

=== Finals ===
Semifinals
(Kazakhstan) Mikhail Kukushkin	4	6^{5}
(France) Matteo Martineau	6	7^{7}
(Belgium) Alexander Blockx	6^{8}	2
(France) Giovanni Mpetshi Perricard	7^{10}	6

Final
(France) Matteo Martineau	6^{2}	4
(France) Giovanni Mpetshi Perricard	7^{7}	6

=== Top half ===
First round
1	(United Kingdom) J Choinski	4	6	3
(Bulgaria) D Kuzmanov	6	1	6
Q	(Poland) F Peliwo	6^{1}	1
(France) Jules Marie	7^{7}	6
Q	(United Kingdom) C Broom	4	6^{3}
(Kazakhstan) M Kukushkin	6	7^{7}
WC	(United Kingdom) K Edmund	6^{4}	7^{7}	4
7	(Belgium) J De Loore	7^{7}	6^{5}	6
3	(Czech Republic) Z Kolář	6	7^{7}
Q	(Switzerland) R Bertola	3	6^{4}
Q	(Germany) M Möller	7	7
PR	(Serbia) F Krajinović	5	5
(Italy) M Bellucci	3	2
(France) M Martineau	6	6
Q	(United Kingdom) A Gray	4	3
8	(United Kingdom) B Harris	6	6

Second round
(Bulgaria) D Kuzmanov	4	6	6
(France) J Marie	6	3	4
(Kazakhstan) M Kukushkin	6	6
7	(Belgium) J De Loore	4	4
3	(Czech Republic) Z Kolář	6	5	6
Q	(Germany) M Möller	4	7	3
(France) M Martineau	7^{7}	6
8	(United Kingdom) B Harris	6^{4}	4

Quarterfinals
(Bulgaria) D Kuzmanov	3	3
(Kazakhstan) M Kukushkin	6	6
3	(Czech Republic) Z Kolář	3	2
(France) M Martineau	6	6

Semifinals
(Kazakhstan) M Kukushkin	4	6^{5}
(France) M Martineau	6	7^{7}

=== Bottom half ===
First round
5	(Switzerland) A Ritschard	6	6
Alt	(Italy) L Giustino	4	3
(France) V Royer	7^{9}	3	6^{4}
(Belgium) A Blockx	6^{7}	6	7^{7}
Alt	(France) T Lamasine	7	7
(Bulgaria) A Andreev	5	5
WC	(United Kingdom) H Searle	3	6	2
4	(Jordan) A Shelbayh	6	4	6
6	(United Kingdom) R Peniston	3	2
(France) G Mpetshi Perricard	6	6
(Italy) F Maestrelli	4	0
(France) M Guinard	6	6
Q	(United Kingdom) H Stewart	7	6
(Czech Republic) J Veselý	5	3
WC	(United Kingdom) P Jubb	6	6
2	(France) A Escoffier	1	4

Second round
5	(Switzerland) A Ritschard	6^{9}	6	4
(Belgium) A Blockx	7^{11}	3	6
Alt	(France) T Lamasine	4	6	4
4	(Jordan) A Shelbayh	6	4	6
(France) G Mpetshi Perricard	6	3	7^{7}
(France) M Guinard	3	6	6^{3}
Q	(United Kingdom) H Stewart	6	6
WC	(United Kingdom) P Jubb	4	4

Quarterfinals
(Belgium) A Blockx	7^{7}	6
4	(Jordan) A Shelbayh	6^{0}	3
(France) G Mpetshi Perricard	7^{9}	7^{7}
Q	(United Kingdom) H Stewart	6^{7}	6^{3}

Semifinals
(Belgium) A Blockx	6^{8}	2
(France) G Mpetshi Perricard	7^{10}	6
