= 2026 Lexus Nottingham Challenger – Singles =

Singles
- 2026 Lexus Nottingham Challenger

Final
- Champion: (France) Clément Chidekh
- Runner-up: (United Kingdom) Johannus Monday
- Score: 5–7, 6–2, 7–6^{(7–5)}

Events
Singles	Doubles
- Lexus Nottingham Challenger

Jack Pinnington Jones was the defending champion but chose not to defend his title.

Clément Chidekh won the title after defeating Johannus Monday 5–7, 6–2, 7–6^{(7–5)} in the final.

== Seeds ==
1. (United Kingdom) Johannus Monday (final)
2. (France) Clément Chidekh (champion)
3. (United Kingdom) Toby Samuel (semifinals)
4. (Bulgaria) Dimitar Kuzmanov (first round)
5. (Portugal) Tiago Pereira (first round)
6. (United Kingdom) Alastair Gray (second round)
7. (United States) Stefan Kozlov (quarterfinals)
8. (Germany) Tom Gentzsch (quarterfinals)

== Draw ==
Key

- Q = Qualifier
- WC = Wild card
- LL = Lucky loser
- Alt = Alternate
- ITF = ITF entry
- PR = Protected ranking
- SR = Special ranking
- SE = Special exempt
- JE = Junior exempt
- JR = Junior Accelerator Programme entrant
- CO = College Accelerator Programme entrant
- NG = Next Gen Accelerator Program entrant
- w/o = Walkover
- r = Retired
- d = Defaulted

=== Finals ===
Semifinals
1	(United Kingdom) Johannus Monday	6	6
(Kazakhstan) Mikhail Kukushkin	4	2
3/WC	(United Kingdom) Toby Samuel	3	7	3
2	(France) Clément Chidekh	6	5	6

Final
1	(United Kingdom) Johannus Monday	7	2	6^{5}
2	(France) Clément Chidekh	5	6	7^{7}

=== Top half ===
First round
1	(United Kingdom) J Monday	4	7^{7}	6
WC	(United Kingdom) L Maxted	6	6^{5}	4
Q	(Italy) A Guerrieri	4	4
(United Kingdom) G Hussey	6	6
(Czech Republic) M Krumich	6	6
(Austria) S Kopp	1	2
(Switzerland) M Brunold	7^{11}	4	4
8	(Germany) T Gentzsch	6^{9}	6	6
4	(Bulgaria) D Kuzmanov	4	6	5
(Germany) C Negritu	6	1	7
(Kazakhstan) M Kukushkin	6	6
NG	(France) Maé Malige	3	0
(United Kingdom) H Searle	4	1
Q	(United States) C Kingsley	6	6
(Slovakia) N Gombos	1	6	1
6	(United Kingdom) A Gray	6	3	6

Second round
1	(United Kingdom) J Monday	6	6
(United Kingdom) G Hussey	1	2
(Czech Republic) M Krumich	6	3	6^{3}
8	(Germany) T Gentzsch	4	6	7^{7}
(Germany) C Negritu	2	1
(Kazakhstan) M Kukushkin	6	6
Q	(United States) C Kingsley	6	4	6
6	(United Kingdom) A Gray	4	6	1

Quarterfinals
1	(United Kingdom) J Monday	6	6
8	(Germany) T Gentzsch	1	3
(Kazakhstan) M Kukushkin	6	7
Q	(United States) C Kingsley	2	5

Semifinals
1	(United Kingdom) J Monday	6	6
(Kazakhstan) M Kukushkin	4	2

=== Bottom half ===
First round
7	(United States) S Kozlov	6	6
(United States) T Zink	4	1
Alt	(Latvia) R Strombachs	6^{5}	6	6^{5}
(France) Mathys Erhard	7^{7}	3	7^{7}
Q	(Germany) D Masur	3	6	3
(United Kingdom) L Broady	6	4	6
Q	(Denmark) CE Overbeck	2	4
3/WC	(United Kingdom) T Samuel	6	6
5	(Portugal) T Pereira	6^{5}	1
Q	(Switzerland) A Ritschard	7^{7}	6
(United Kingdom) C Broom	7	6
(United Kingdom) H Wendelken	5	3
(Colombia) A Soriano Barrera	3	7^{7}	6^{4}
WC	(United Kingdom) P Jubb	6	6^{3}	7^{7}
Q	(United Kingdom) A Matusevich	7^{7}	4	0
2	(France) C Chidekh	6^{3}	6	6

Second round
7	(United States) S Kozlov	6	6
(France) M Erhard	2	4
(United Kingdom) L Broady	3	3
3/WC	(United Kingdom) T Samuel	6	6
Q	(Switzerland) A Ritschard	4	2
(United Kingdom) C Broom	6	6
WC	(United Kingdom) P Jubb	2	3
2	(France) C Chidekh	6	6

Quarterfinals
7	(United States) S Kozlov	6^{1}	4
3/WC	(United Kingdom) T Samuel	7^{7}	6
(United Kingdom) C Broom	3	2
2	(France) C Chidekh	6	6

Semifinals
3/WC	(United Kingdom) T Samuel	3	7	3
2	(France) C Chidekh	6	5	6
