= 2026 Lexus Nottingham Challenger II – Singles =

Singles
- 2026 Lexus Nottingham Challenger II

Final
- Champion: (United Kingdom) Henry Searle
- Runner-up: (France) Clément Chidekh
- Score: 6–4, 6–4

Events
Singles	Doubles
- Lexus Nottingham Challenger

Clément Chidekh was the defending champion but lost in the final to Henry Searle.

Searle won the title after defeating Chidekh 6–4, 6–4 in the final.

== Seeds ==
1. (France) Clément Chidekh (final)
2. (United Kingdom) Felix Gill (quarterfinals)
3. (China) Zhou Yi (quarterfinals)
4. (United Kingdom) Henry Searle (champion)
5. (United Kingdom) Alastair Gray (semifinals)
6. (France) Antoine Ghibaudo (first round)
7. (Italy) Filippo Romano (first round)
8. (United Kingdom) Johannus Monday (quarterfinals)

== Draw ==
Key

- Q = Qualifier
- WC = Wild card
- LL = Lucky loser
- Alt = Alternate
- ITF = ITF entry
- PR = Protected ranking
- SR = Special ranking
- SE = Special exempt
- JE = Junior exempt
- JR = Junior Accelerator Programme entrant
- CO = College Accelerator Programme entrant
- NG = Next Gen Accelerator Program entrant
- w/o = Walkover
- r = Retired
- d = Defaulted

=== Finals ===
Semifinals
1	(France) Clément Chidekh	7	6
5	(United Kingdom) Alastair Gray	5	3
4	(United Kingdom) Henry Searle	7	6
(United Kingdom) Max Basing	5	2

Final
1	(France) Clément Chidekh	4	4
4	(United Kingdom) Henry Searle	6	6

=== Top half ===
First round
1	(France) C Chidekh	4	6	6
(France) M Janvier	6	4	3
(Spain) A Barroso Campos	6	6
(France) Guillaume Dalmasso	3	4
Q	(Bulgaria) I Ivanov	7^{7}	6
(Netherlands) N Visker	6^{3}	3
(United Kingdom) L Maxted	6	6
6	(France) A Ghibaudo	3	1
3	(China) Y Zhou	6	6
(France) Robin Catry	4	3
(Netherlands) D de Jonge	7^{8}	6
(United Kingdom) Emile Hudd	6^{6}	4
Q	(United Kingdom) Patrick Brady	6	7
Q	(Norway) Herman Høyeraal	3	5
WC	(United Kingdom) Oscar Weightman	2	4
5	(United Kingdom) A Gray	6	6

Second round
1	(France) C Chidekh	6	6
(Spain) A Barroso Campos	3	3
Q	(Bulgaria) I Ivanov	6	6
(United Kingdom) L Maxted	3	4
3	(China) Y Zhou	6^{3}	6	6
(Netherlands) D de Jonge	7^{7}	1	1
Q	(United Kingdom) P Brady	1	1
5	(United Kingdom) A Gray	6	6

Quarterfinals
1	(France) C Chidekh	6	6
Q	(Bulgaria) I Ivanov	2	2
3	(China) Y Zhou	3	4
5	(United Kingdom) A Gray	6	6

Semifinals
1	(France) C Chidekh	7	6
5	(United Kingdom) A Gray	5	3

=== Bottom half ===
First round
8	(United Kingdom) J Monday	6	6
WC	(United Kingdom) M Summers	3	3
(Turkey) A Azkara	7^{8}	6
WC	(United Kingdom) Oliver Bonding	6^{6}	3
Q	(United Kingdom) Marcus Walters	2	1
Q	(Israel) Amit Vales	6	6
(Germany) P Zahraj	4	7^{7}	3
4	(United Kingdom) H Searle	6	6^{2}	6
7	(Italy) F Romano	6	3	6^{5}
(United Kingdom) M Basing	0	6	7^{7}
(Malaysia) Mitsuki Wei Kang Leong	6^{4}	3
(Switzerland) L Castelnuovo	7^{7}	6
(Slovenia) Filip Jeff Planinšek	7^{7}	6
(Brazil) I Marcondes	6^{4}	3
Q	(United Kingdom) William Jansen	4	7^{7}	4
2	(United Kingdom) F Gill	6	6^{5}	6

Second round
8	(United Kingdom) J Monday	6	6
(Turkey) A Azkara	3	2
Q	(Israel) A Vales	3	2
4	(United Kingdom) H Searle	6	6
(United Kingdom) M Basing	6	6^{2}	6
(Switzerland) L Castelnuovo	4	7^{7}	3
(Slovenia) FJ Planinšek	1	3
2	(United Kingdom) F Gill	6	6

Quarterfinals
8	(United Kingdom) J Monday	4	5
4	(United Kingdom) H Searle	6	7
(United Kingdom) M Basing	2	6	7^{7}
2	(United Kingdom) F Gill	6	3	6^{4}

Semifinals
4	(United Kingdom) H Searle	7	6
(United Kingdom) M Basing	5	2
