= 2026 Lexus Nottingham Challenger II =

- Date: 6–12 July
- Edition: 5th
- Surface: Grass
- Location: Nottingham, United Kingdom

Champions

Singles
- (United Kingdom) Henry Searle

Doubles
- (United Kingdom) Tom Hands / (United Kingdom) Matthew Summers
- Lexus Nottingham Challenger

The 2026 Lexus Nottingham Challenger II was a professional tennis tournament played on grass courts. It was the fifth edition of the tournament which was part of the 2026 ATP Challenger Tour. It took place in Nottingham, United Kingdom between 6 and 12 July 2026.

== Singles main-draw entrants ==
=== Seeds ===
Country	Player	Rank^{1}	Seed
FRA	Clément Chidekh	205	1
GBR	Felix Gill	220	2
CHN	Zhou Yi	240	3
GBR	Henry Searle	273	4
GBR	Alastair Gray	277	5
FRA	Antoine Ghibaudo	298	6
ITA	Filippo Romano	312	7
GBR	Johannus Monday	313	8

- ^{1} Rankings are as of 29 June 2026.

=== Other entrants ===
The following players received wildcards into the singles main draw:

- (United Kingdom) Oliver Bonding
- (United Kingdom) Matthew Summers
- (United Kingdom) Oscar Weightman

The following players received entry from the qualifying draw:

- (United Kingdom) Patrick Brady
- (Norway) Herman Høyeraal
- (Bulgaria) Ivan Ivanov
- (United Kingdom) William Jansen
- (Israel) Amit Vales
- (United Kingdom) Marcus Walters

== Champions ==
=== Singles ===
- (United Kingdom) Henry Searle def. (France) Clément Chidekh 6–4, 6–4.

=== Doubles ===
- (United Kingdom) Tom Hands / (United Kingdom) Matthew Summers def. (Turkey) Arda Azkara / (Turkey) S Mert Özdemir 6–4, 4–6, [12–10].
