= 2026 Lexus Nottingham Challenger – Doubles =

Doubles
- 2026 Lexus Nottingham Challenger

Final
- Champions: (United Kingdom) Charles Broom (United Kingdom) David Stevenson
- Runners-up: (Slovakia) Miloš Karol (Germany) Daniel Masur
- Score: 6–2, 7–6^{(7–5)}

Events
| Singles | Doubles |
- Lexus Nottingham Challenger

Scott Duncan and James MacKinlay were the defending champions but lost in the quarterfinals to Tom Hands and Harry Wendelken.

Charles Broom and David Stevenson won the title after defeating Miloš Karol and Daniel Masur 6–2, 7–6^{(7–5)} in the final.

== Seeds ==
1. (Poland) Szymon Kielan / (Poland) Filip Pieczonka (first round)
2. (Romania) Victor Vlad Cornea / (Poland) Szymon Walków (quarterfinals)
3. (Czech Republic) Filip Duda / (Germany) Christoph Negritu (first round)
4. (Czech Republic) David Poljak / (Germany) Tim Rühl (first round)

== Draw ==
Key

- Q = Qualifier
- WC = Wild card
- LL = Lucky loser
- Alt = Alternate
- ITF = ITF entry
- PR = Protected ranking
- SR = Special ranking
- SE = Special exempt
- JE = Junior exempt
- JR = Junior Accelerator Programme entrant
- CO = College Accelerator Programme entrant
- NG = Next Gen Accelerator Program entrant
- w/o = Walkover
- r = Retired
- d = Defaulted

First round
1 | (Poland) S Kielan (Poland) F Pieczonka | 4 | 4
(United Kingdom) F Bass (United Kingdom) B Jones | 6 | 6
(United States) A Fenty (United States) J Sheehy | 6 | 2 | [5]
(United Kingdom) L Broady (United Kingdom) M Whitehouse | 2 | 6 | [10]
4 | (Czech Republic) D Poljak (Germany) T Rühl | 1 | 4
WC | (United Kingdom) G Hussey (United Kingdom) J Monday | 6 | 6
(Slovakia) M Karol (Germany) D Masur | 4 | 6 | [10]
Alt | (Bulgaria) D Kuzmanov (Kazakhstan) D Yevseyev | 6 | 3 | [5]
WC | (United Kingdom) Finn Murgett (United Kingdom) James Story | 3 | 6 | [5]
(United Kingdom) S Duncan (United Kingdom) J MacKinlay | 6 | 3 | [10]
(United Kingdom) T Hands (United Kingdom) H Wendelken | 3 | 6 | [10]
3 | (Czech Republic) F Duda (Germany) C Negritu | 6 | 4 | [7]
(United Kingdom) C Broom (United Kingdom) D Stevenson | 6 | 6
(Italy) Simone Agostini (Czech Republic) J Jermář | 1 | 3
(Austria) S Kopp (Portugal) T Pereira | 3 | 3
2 | (Romania) V Cornea (Poland) S Walków | 6 | 6

Quarterfinals
(United Kingdom) F Bass (United Kingdom) B Jones | 7^{7} | 6
(United Kingdom) L Broady (United Kingdom) M Whitehouse | 6^{4} | 3
WC | (United Kingdom) G Hussey (United Kingdom) J Monday | 1 | 2
(Slovakia) M Karol (Germany) D Masur | 6 | 6
(United Kingdom) S Duncan (United Kingdom) J MacKinlay | 2 | 1
(United Kingdom) T Hands (United Kingdom) H Wendelken | 6 | 6
(United Kingdom) C Broom (United Kingdom) D Stevenson | 7^{9} | 4 | [10]
2 | (Romania) V Cornea (Poland) S Walków | 6^{7} | 6 | [4]

Semifinals
(United Kingdom) F Bass (United Kingdom) B Jones | 3 | 4
(Slovakia) M Karol (Germany) D Masur | 6 | 6
(United Kingdom) T Hands (United Kingdom) H Wendelken | 4 | 4
(United Kingdom) C Broom (United Kingdom) D Stevenson | 6 | 6

Final
(Slovakia) M Karol (Germany) D Masur | 2 | 6^{5}
(United Kingdom) C Broom (United Kingdom) D Stevenson | 6 | 7^{7}
