= 2026 Lexus Nottingham Challenger II – Doubles =

Doubles
- 2026 Lexus Nottingham Challenger II

Final
- Champions: (United Kingdom) Tom Hands (United Kingdom) Matthew Summers
- Runners-up: (Turkey) Arda Azkara (Turkey) S Mert Özdemir
- Score: 6–4, 4–6, [12–10]

Events
Singles	Doubles
- Lexus Nottingham Challenger

Charles Broom and David Stevenson were the defending champions but chose not to defend their title.

Tom Hands and Matthew Summers won the title after defeating Arda Azkara and S Mert Özdemir 6–4, 4–6, [12–10] in the final.

== Seeds ==
1. (United Kingdom) Finn Bass / (United Kingdom) James MacKinlay (quarterfinals)
2. (Netherlands) Daniel de Jonge / (Netherlands) Niels Visker (semifinals)
3. (Brazil) Igor Marcondes / (Sweden) Nikola Slavic (quarterfinals)
4. (Switzerland) Nicolás Parizzia / (Italy) Filippo Romano (first round)

== Draw ==
Key

- Q = Qualifier
- WC = Wild card
- LL = Lucky loser
- Alt = Alternate
- ITF = ITF entry
- PR = Protected ranking
- SR = Special ranking
- SE = Special exempt
- JE = Junior exempt
- JR = Junior Accelerator Programme entrant
- CO = College Accelerator Programme entrant
- NG = Next Gen Accelerator Program entrant
- w/o = Walkover
- r = Retired
- d = Defaulted

First round
1	(United Kingdom) F Bass (United Kingdom) J MacKinlay	6	6
(Republic of Ireland) C Barry (Republic of Ireland) C Gannon	4	4
(France) Robin Catry (France) M Janvier	4	3
(France) Guillaume Dalmasso (Germany) P Zahraj	6	6
3	(Brazil) I Marcondes (Sweden) Nikola Slavic	6	6
(Malaysia) Mitsuki Wei Kang Leong (United States) Michael Zhu	3	4
(Italy) Matteo Covato (Bulgaria) Dinko Dinev	1	6^{4}
(United Kingdom) T Hands (United Kingdom) M Summers	6	7^{7}
(Republic of Ireland) Cian Maguire (Romania) Vladislav Melnic	3	2
(Spain) A Barroso Campos (Switzerland) L Castelnuovo	6	6
(Turkey) A Azkara (Turkey) S Mert Özdemir	1	6	[10]
4	(Switzerland) Nicolás Parizzia (Italy) F Romano	6	3	[6]
(Australia) Je Delaney (Japan) Yamato Sueoka	3	6^{4}
(United Kingdom) Liam Hignett (United Kingdom) Marcus Walters	6	7^{7}
(Australia) Sam Ryan Ziegann (United States) R Seggerman	4	6	[2]
2	(Netherlands) D de Jonge (Netherlands) N Visker	6	3	[10]

Quarterfinals
1	(United Kingdom) F Bass (United Kingdom) J MacKinlay	6	4	[7]
(France) G Dalmasso (Germany) P Zahraj	3	6	[10]
3	(Brazil) I Marcondes (Sweden) N Slavic	7^{9}	4	[8]
(United Kingdom) T Hands (United Kingdom) M Summers	6^{7}	6	[10]
(Spain) A Barroso Campos (Switzerland) L Castelnuovo	7^{7}	3	[12]
(Turkey) A Azkara (Turkey) SM Özdemir	6^{5}	6	[14]
(United Kingdom) L Hignett (United Kingdom) M Walters	4	6^{3}
2	(Netherlands) D de Jonge (Netherlands) N Visker	6	7^{7}

Semifinals
(France) G Dalmasso (Germany) P Zahraj
(United Kingdom) T Hands (United Kingdom) M Summers	w/o
(Turkey) A Azkara (Turkey) SM Özdemir	6	7^{10}
2	(Netherlands) D de Jonge (Netherlands) N Visker	3	6^{8}

Final
(United Kingdom) T Hands (United Kingdom) M Summers	6	4	[12]
(Turkey) A Azkara (Turkey) SM Özdemir	4	6	[10]
