= 2024 Lexus Nottingham Challenger =

- Date: 5–11 February
- Edition: 1st
- Surface: Hard (indoor)
- Location: Nottingham, United Kingdom

Champions

Singles
- (France) Giovanni Mpetshi Perricard

Doubles
- (Czech Republic) Petr Nouza / (Czech Republic) Patrik Rikl
- Lexus Nottingham Challenger

The 2024 Lexus Nottingham Challenger was a professional tennis tournament played on indoor hard courts. It was the first edition of the tournament which was part of the 2024 ATP Challenger Tour. It took place in Nottingham, United Kingdom between 5 and 11 February 2024.

== Singles main-draw entrants ==
=== Seeds ===
Country	Player	Rank^{1}	Seed
GBR	Jan Choinski	157	1
FRA	Antoine Escoffier	172	2
CZE	Zdeněk Kolář	180	3
JOR	Abdullah Shelbayh	181	4
SUI	Alexander Ritschard	183	5
GBR	Ryan Peniston	186	6
BEL	Joris De Loore	192	7
GBR	Billy Harris	195	8

- ^{1} Rankings are as of 29 January 2024.

=== Other entrants ===
The following players received wildcards into the singles main draw:

- (United Kingdom) Kyle Edmund
- (United Kingdom) Paul Jubb
- (United Kingdom) Henry Searle

The following player received entry into the singles main draw using a protected ranking:

- (Serbia) Filip Krajinović

The following players received entry into the singles main draw as alternates:

- (Italy) Lorenzo Giustino
- (France) Tristan Lamasine

The following players received entry from the qualifying draw:

- (Switzerland) Rémy Bertola
- (United Kingdom) Charles Broom
- (United Kingdom) Alastair Gray
- (Germany) Marvin Möller
- (Poland) Filip Peliwo
- (United Kingdom) Hamish Stewart

== Champions ==
=== Singles ===
- (France) Giovanni Mpetshi Perricard def. (France) Matteo Martineau 7–6^{(7–2)}, 6–4.

=== Doubles ===
- (Czech Republic) Petr Nouza / (Czech Republic) Patrik Rikl def. (France) Antoine Escoffier / (United Kingdom) Joshua Paris 6–3, 7–6^{(7–3)}.
