= 2025 Wimbledon Championships – Men's doubles =

Tennis championship

Men's doubles
- 2025 Wimbledon Championships

Final
- Champions: (United Kingdom) Julian Cash (United Kingdom) Lloyd Glasspool
- Runners-up: (Australia) Rinky Hijikata (Netherlands) David Pel
- Score: 6–2, 7–6^{(7–3)}
- Date: 12 July 2025

Details
- Draw: 64
- Seeds: 16

Events
Singles	men	women		boys	girls
Doubles	men	women	mixed	boys	girls
WC Singles	men	women	quad
WC Doubles	men	women	quad
14&U Singles	boys	girls
Legends	men	women	mixed
- Wimbledon Championships

Julian Cash and Lloyd Glasspool defeated Rinky Hijikata and David Pel in the final, 6–2, 7–6^{(7–3)} to win the gentlemen's doubles tennis title at the 2025 Wimbledon Championships. It was the first major title for both players. Cash and Glasspool became the first all-British pairing to win the men's doubles title at Wimbledon in the Open Era, and first overall since Pat Hughes and Raymond Tuckey in 1936. They saved three match points en route to the title, against defending champions Harri Heliövaara and Henry Patten in the quarterfinals. Hijikata and Pel had also saved match points en route to the finals, doing so in three different matches: two in the first round against Göransson and Verbeek, one in the second round against Cash and Tracy, and two in the semifinals against Arévalo and Pavić. They became the first pair of alternates to reach a major final in the Open Era, having previously not met or spoken to each other before agreeing to pair up for the event.

Marcelo Arévalo and Mate Pavić retained the ATP No. 1 doubles ranking by reaching the quarterfinals. Kevin Krawietz and the pair of Heliövaara and Patten were also in contention for the top ranking at the beginning of the tournament.

== Seeds ==
1. (El Salvador) Marcelo Arévalo / (Croatia) Mate Pavić (semifinals)
2. (Finland) Harri Heliövaara / (United Kingdom) Henry Patten (quarterfinals)
3. (Germany) Kevin Krawietz / (Germany) Tim Pütz (third round)
4. (Spain) Marcel Granollers / (Argentina) Horacio Zeballos (semifinals)
5. (United Kingdom) Julian Cash / (United Kingdom) Lloyd Glasspool (champions)
6. (United Kingdom) Joe Salisbury / (United Kingdom) Neal Skupski (quarterfinals)
7. (Italy) Simone Bolelli / (Italy) Andrea Vavassori (second round)
8. (Croatia) Nikola Mektić / (New Zealand) Michael Venus (second round)
9. (United States) Christian Harrison / (United States) Evan King (first round)
10. (Monaco) Hugo Nys / (France) Édouard Roger-Vasselin (quarterfinals)
11. (France) Sadio Doumbia / (France) Fabien Reboul (second round)
12. (Argentina) Máximo González / (Argentina) Andrés Molteni (third round)
13. (United States) Nathaniel Lammons / (United States) Jackson Withrow (first round)
14. (Sweden) André Göransson / (Netherlands) Sem Verbeek (first round)
15. (Australia) Matthew Ebden / (Australia) John Peers (first round)
16. (India) Yuki Bhambri / (United States) Robert Galloway (third round)

Click on the seed number of a player to go to their draw section.

== Draw ==
Key

- Q = Qualifier
- WC = Wild card
- LL = Lucky loser
- Alt = Alternate
- ITF = ITF entry
- PR = Protected ranking
- SR = Special ranking
- SE = Special exempt
- JE = Junior exempt
- JR = Junior Accelerator Programme entrant
- CO = College Accelerator Programme entrant
- NG = Next Gen Accelerator Program entrant
- w/o = Walkover
- r = Retired
- d = Defaulted

=== Finals ===
Quarterfinals
1	(El Salvador) Marcelo Arévalo (Croatia) Mate Pavić	6	6^{2}	7^{10}
10	(Monaco) Hugo Nys (France) Édouard Roger-Vasselin	4	7^{7}	6^{5}
Alt	(Australia) Rinky Hijikata (Netherlands) David Pel	7^{7}	6
(Brazil) Rafael Matos (Brazil) Marcelo Melo	6^{5}	4
6	(United Kingdom) Joe Salisbury (United Kingdom) Neal Skupski	6^{6}	6^{3}
4	(Spain) Marcel Granollers (Argentina) Horacio Zeballos	7^{8}	7^{7}
5	(United Kingdom) Julian Cash (United Kingdom) Lloyd Glasspool	6	4	7^{10}
2	(Finland) Harri Heliövaara (United Kingdom) Henry Patten	4	6	6^{8}

Semifinals
1	(El Salvador) Marcelo Arévalo (Croatia) Mate Pavić	7^{7}	6^{5}	6^{9}
Alt	(Australia) Rinky Hijikata (Netherlands) David Pel	6^{2}	7^{7}	7^{11}
4	(Spain) Marcel Granollers (Argentina) Horacio Zeballos	3	4
5	(United Kingdom) Julian Cash (United Kingdom) Lloyd Glasspool	6	6

Final
Alt	(Australia) Rinky Hijikata (Netherlands) David Pel	2	6^{3}
5	(United Kingdom) Julian Cash (United Kingdom) Lloyd Glasspool	6	7^{7}

=== Top half ===
==== Section 1 ====
First round
1	(El Salvador) M Arévalo (Croatia) M Pavić	6	6
(Spain) R Carballés Baena (Serbia) L Djere	4	2
(Czech Republic) T Macháč (Czech Republic) J Menšík	4	6	3
(Spain) P Martínez (Spain) J Munar	6	3	6
(Portugal) F Cabral (Austria) L Miedler	7^{12}	6
(United Kingdom) J Murray (United States) R Ram	6^{10}	3
(Czech Republic) P Nouza (Czech Republic) P Rikl	6	6
15	(Australia) M Ebden (Australia) J Peers	3	4
10	(Monaco) H Nys (France) É Roger-Vasselin	7^{7}	7
(France) B Bonzi (France) G Jacq	6^{5}	5
(Germany) J Schnaitter (Germany) M Wallner	6	7^{7}
(Argentina) S Báez (Argentina) F Comesaña	4	6^{2}
(Czech Republic) A Pavlásek (Poland) J Zieliński	7^{8}	7^{7}
(Mexico) S González (United States) A Krajicek	6^{6}	6^{4}
(Uruguay) A Behar (Belgium) J Vliegen	6^{5}	6^{3}
7	(Italy) S Bolelli (Italy) A Vavassori	7^{7}	7^{7}

Second round
1	(El Salvador) M Arévalo (Croatia) M Pavić	6	6
(Spain) P Martínez (Spain) J Munar	3	2
(Portugal) F Cabral (Austria) L Miedler	3	6^{9}
(Czech Republic) P Nouza (Czech Republic) P Rikl	6	7^{11}
10	(Monaco) H Nys (France) É Roger-Vasselin	6	6
(Germany) J Schnaitter (Germany) M Wallner	4	4
(Czech Republic) A Pavlásek (Poland) J Zieliński	7^{11}	7^{7}
7	(Italy) S Bolelli (Italy) A Vavassori	6^{9}	6^{5}

Third round
1	(El Salvador) M Arévalo (Croatia) M Pavić	7	7^{15}
(Czech Republic) P Nouza (Czech Republic) P Rikl	5	6^{13}
10	(Monaco) H Nys (France) É Roger-Vasselin	3	7^{7}	6
(Czech Republic) A Pavlásek (Poland) J Zieliński	6	6^{1}	4

Quarterfinals
1	(El Salvador) M Arévalo (Croatia) M Pavić	6	6^{2}	7^{10}
10	(Monaco) H Nys (France) É Roger-Vasselin	4	7^{7}	6^{5}

==== Section 2 ====
First round
3	(Germany) K Krawietz (Germany) T Pütz	6	6
(India) R Bopanna (Belgium) S Gillé	3	4
(Australia) MC Romios (United States) R Seggerman	6	6
Alt	(India) A Kadhe (Czech Republic) V Kopřiva	4	4
(United States) R Cash (United States) JJ Tracy	6	7^{9}
Alt	(Poland) K Drzewiecki (Poland) P Matuszewski	3	6^{7}
Alt	(Australia) R Hijikata (Netherlands) D Pel	4	7^{8}	7^{11}
14	(Sweden) A Göransson (Netherlands) S Verbeek	6	6^{6}	6^{9}
11	(France) S Doumbia (France) F Reboul	6	6^{5}	6
(Belgium) Z Bergs (Canada) G Diallo	4	7^{7}	3
(Austria) A Erler (Germany) C Frantzen	7^{7}	6
PR	(United States) J Brooksby (Australia) A Walton	6^{5}	4
(Brazil) R Matos (Brazil) M Melo	6^{5}	7^{7}	6
(Croatia) I Dodig (Brazil) O Luz	7^{7}	6^{5}	4
WC	(United Kingdom) L Maxted (United Kingdom) C Thomson	4	6^{4}
8	(Croatia) N Mektić (New Zealand) M Venus	6	7^{7}

Second round
3	(Germany) K Krawietz (Germany) T Pütz	6	7^{7}
(Australia) MC Romios (United States) R Seggerman	3	6^{3}
(United States) R Cash (United States) JJ Tracy	3	7^{7}	6^{11}
Alt	(Australia) R Hijikata (Netherlands) D Pel	6	6^{5}	7^{13}
11	(France) S Doumbia (France) F Reboul	6	6^{4}	3
(Austria) A Erler (Germany) C Frantzen	3	7^{7}	6
(Brazil) R Matos (Brazil) M Melo	7^{7}	5	7^{10}
8	(Croatia) N Mektić (New Zealand) M Venus	6^{3}	7	6^{6}

Third round
3	(Germany) K Krawietz (Germany) T Pütz	2	4
Alt	(Australia) R Hijikata (Netherlands) D Pel	6	6
(Austria) A Erler (Germany) C Frantzen	4	6	5
(Brazil) R Matos (Brazil) M Melo	6	3	7

Quarterfinals
Alt	(Australia) R Hijikata (Netherlands) D Pel	7^{7}	6
(Brazil) R Matos (Brazil) M Melo	6^{5}	4

=== Bottom half ===
==== Section 3 ====
First round
6	(United Kingdom) J Salisbury (United Kingdom) N Skupski	6	5	6
WC	(United Kingdom) C Broom (United Kingdom) J Paris	3	7	4
(Belgium) D Goffin (France) A Müller	6	4	6^{11}
(Colombia) N Barrientos (India) RC Bollipalli	4	6	7^{13}
(France) T Arribagé (United States) P Trhac	3	6	7^{10}
PR	(France) Q Halys (France) N Mahut	6	3	6^{5}
(Bosnia and Herzegovina) D Džumhur (Tunisia) S Mansouri	4	2
12	(Argentina) M González (Argentina) A Molteni	6	6
16	(India) Y Bhambri (United States) R Galloway	7^{10}	6
(Monaco) R Arneodo (France) M Guinard	6^{8}	4
(Netherlands) R Haase (Netherlands) J-J Rojer	6^{6}	1
(Portugal) N Borges (United States) M Giron	7^{8}	6
(United States) A Kovacevic (United States) L Tien	4	4
(India) S Balaji (Mexico) M Reyes-Varela	6	6
Alt	(China) Y Bu (Chinese Taipei) R Ho	6^{5}	3
4	(Spain) M Granollers (Argentina) H Zeballos	7^{7}	6

Second round
6	(United Kingdom) J Salisbury (United Kingdom) N Skupski	6	7^{9}
(Colombia) N Barrientos (India) RC Bollipalli	4	6^{7}
(France) T Arribagé (United States) P Trhac	4	7^{7}	3
12	(Argentina) M González (Argentina) A Molteni	6	6^{5}	6
16	(India) Y Bhambri (United States) R Galloway	6	7^{8}
(Portugal) N Borges (United States) M Giron	3	6^{6}
(India) S Balaji (Mexico) M Reyes-Varela	4	4
4	(Spain) M Granollers (Argentina) H Zeballos	6	6

Third round
6	(United Kingdom) J Salisbury (United Kingdom) N Skupski	6	6^{7}	7^{10}
12	(Argentina) M González (Argentina) A Molteni	1	7^{9}	6^{7}
16	(India) Y Bhambri (United States) R Galloway	4	6	6^{4}
4	(Spain) M Granollers (Argentina) H Zeballos	6	3	7^{10}

Quarterfinals
6	(United Kingdom) J Salisbury (United Kingdom) N Skupski	6^{6}	6^{3}
4	(Spain) M Granollers (Argentina) H Zeballos	7^{8}	7^{7}

==== Section 4 ====
First round
5	(United Kingdom) J Cash (United Kingdom) L Glasspool	7^{8}	6
Alt	(United States) V Kirkov (Netherlands) B Stevens	6^{6}	4
(Argentina) TM Etcheverry (Argentina) C Ugo Carabelli	4	4
(Germany) H Jebens (France) A Olivetti	6	6
(Brazil) F Romboli (Australia) J-P Smith	6	7
(United States) M McDonald (United States) A Michelsen	4	5
(Argentina) G Andreozzi (Brazil) M Demoliner	6	7^{7}
9	(United States) C Harrison (United States) E King	3	6^{4}
13	(United States) N Lammons (United States) J Withrow	4	6^{3}
(France) P-H Herbert (Australia) J Thompson	6	7^{7}
WC	(United Kingdom) J Monday (United Kingdom) D Stevenson	6^{2}	2
(Italy) M Bellucci (Hungary) F Marozsán	7^{7}	6
WC	(United Kingdom) B Harris (United Kingdom) M Willis	7^{7}	7^{7}
(Kazakhstan) A Bublik (Italy) F Cobolli	6^{3}	6^{2}
WC	(United Kingdom) D Evans (United Kingdom) H Searle	6^{4}	4
2	(Finland) H Heliövaara (United Kingdom) H Patten	7^{7}	6

Second round
5	(United Kingdom) J Cash (United Kingdom) L Glasspool	6	6
(Germany) H Jebens (France) A Olivetti	3	4
(Brazil) F Romboli (Australia) J-P Smith	3	4
(Argentina) G Andreozzi (Brazil) M Demoliner	6	6
(France) P-H Herbert (Australia) J Thompson	6	6^{7}	6
(Italy) M Bellucci (Hungary) F Marozsán	4	7^{9}	3
WC	(United Kingdom) B Harris (United Kingdom) M Willis	6^{6}	3
2	(Finland) H Heliövaara (United Kingdom) H Patten	7^{8}	6

Third round
5	(United Kingdom) J Cash (United Kingdom) L Glasspool	6	6
(Argentina) G Andreozzi (Brazil) M Demoliner	3	4
(France) P-H Herbert (Australia) J Thompson
2	(Finland) H Heliövaara (United Kingdom) H Patten	w/o

Quarterfinals
5	(United Kingdom) J Cash (United Kingdom) L Glasspool	6	4	7^{10}
2	(Finland) H Heliövaara (United Kingdom) H Patten	4	6	6^{8}

== Seeded teams ==
The following are the seeded teams. Seedings are based on ATP rankings as of 23 June 2025.

Country	Player	Country	Player	Rank	Seed
ESA	Marcelo Arévalo	CRO	Mate Pavić	2	1
FIN	Harri Heliövaara	GBR	Henry Patten	6	2
GER	Kevin Krawietz	GER	Tim Pütz	11	3
ESP	Marcel Granollers	ARG	Horacio Zeballos	15	4
GBR	Julian Cash	GBR	Lloyd Glasspool	22	5
GBR	Joe Salisbury	GBR	Neal Skupski	28	6
ITA	Simone Bolelli	ITA	Andrea Vavassori	29	7
CRO	Nikola Mektić	NZL	Michael Venus	33	8
USA	Christian Harrison	USA	Evan King	37	9
MON	Hugo Nys	FRA	Édouard Roger-Vasselin	46	10
FRA	Sadio Doumbia	FRA	Fabien Reboul	49	11
ARG	Máximo González	ARG	Andrés Molteni	54	12
USA	Nathaniel Lammons	USA	Jackson Withrow	57	13
SWE	André Göransson	NED	Sem Verbeek	58	14
AUS	Matthew Ebden	AUS	John Peers	66	15
IND	Yuki Bhambri	USA	Robert Galloway	71	16

== Other entry information ==
=== Wildcards ===
- (United Kingdom) Charles Broom / (United Kingdom) Joshua Paris
- (United Kingdom) Dan Evans / (United Kingdom) Henry Searle
- (United Kingdom) Billy Harris / (United Kingdom) Marcus Willis
- (United Kingdom) Lui Maxted / (United Kingdom) Connor Thomson
- (United Kingdom) Johannus Monday / (United Kingdom) David Stevenson

=== Protected ranking ===
- (United States) Jenson Brooksby / (Australia) Adam Walton
- ~~(Argentina) Francisco Cerúndolo / (Argentina) Guillermo Durán~~
- (France) Quentin Halys / (France) Nicolas Mahut

=== Alternates ===
- (China) Bu Yunchaokete / (Chinese Taipei) Ray Ho
- (Poland) Karol Drzewiecki / (Poland) Piotr Matuszewski
- (Australia) Rinky Hijikata / (Netherlands) David Pel
- (India) Arjun Kadhe / (Czech Republic) Vít Kopřiva
- (United States) Vasil Kirkov / (Netherlands) Bart Stevens

=== Withdrawals ===
- ‡ (Netherlands) Sander Arends / (United Kingdom) Luke Johnson → replaced by § (Netherlands) Sander Arends / (France) Arthur Rinderknech → replaced by (Poland) Karol Drzewiecki / (Poland) Piotr Matuszewski
- § (Argentina) Francisco Cerúndolo / (Argentina) Guillermo Durán → replaced by (Australia) Rinky Hijikata / (Netherlands) David Pel
- § (Italy) Luciano Darderi / (Ecuador) Diego Hidalgo → replaced by (India) Arjun Kadhe / (Czech Republic) Vít Kopřiva
- § (Netherlands) Tallon Griekspoor / (Netherlands) Botic van de Zandschulp → replaced by (United States) Vasil Kirkov / (Netherlands) Bart Stevens
- § (Serbia) Miomir Kecmanović / (Germany) Andreas Mies → replaced by (China) Bu Yunchaokete / (Chinese Taipei) Ray Ho

‡ – withdrew from entry list
§ – withdrew from main draw
