= 2026 Lexus Nottingham Challenger =

- Date: 5–10 January
- Edition: 4th
- Surface: Hard (indoor)
- Location: Nottingham, United Kingdom

Champions

Singles
- (France) Clément Chidekh

Doubles
- (United Kingdom) Charles Broom / (United Kingdom) David Stevenson
- Lexus Nottingham Challenger

The 2026 Lexus Nottingham Challenger was a professional tennis tournament played on indoor hard courts. It was the fourth edition of the tournament which was part of the 2026 ATP Challenger Tour. It took place in Nottingham, United Kingdom between 5 and 10 January 2026.

== Singles main-draw entrants ==
=== Seeds ===
Country	Player	Rank^{1}	Seed
GBR	Johannus Monday	234	1
FRA	Clément Chidekh	248	2
GBR	Toby Samuel	262	3
BUL	Dimitar Kuzmanov	263	4
POR	Tiago Pereira	267	5
GBR	Alastair Gray	284	6
USA	Stefan Kozlov	289	7
GER	Tom Gentzsch	291	8

- ^{1} Rankings are as of 29 December 2025.

=== Other entrants ===
The following players received wildcards into the singles main draw:

- (United Kingdom) Paul Jubb
- (United Kingdom) Lui Maxted
- (United Kingdom) Toby Samuel

The following player received entry into the singles main draw through the Next Gen Accelerator programme:

- (France) Maé Malige

The following player received entry into the singles main draw as an alternate:

- (Latvia) Robert Strombachs

The following players received entry from the qualifying draw:

- (Italy) Andrea Guerrieri
- (United States) Cannon Kingsley
- (Germany) Daniel Masur
- (United Kingdom) Anton Matusevich
- (Denmark) Carl Emil Overbeck
- (Switzerland) Alexander Ritschard

== Champions ==
=== Singles ===
- (France) Clément Chidekh def. (United Kingdom) Johannus Monday 5–7, 6–2, 7–6^{(7–5)}.

=== Doubles ===
- (United Kingdom) Charles Broom / (United Kingdom) David Stevenson def. (Slovakia) Miloš Karol / (Germany) Daniel Masur 6–2, 7–6^{(7–5)}.
