= 2024 Lexus Nottingham Challenger – Doubles =

Doubles
- 2024 Lexus Nottingham Challenger

Final
- Champions: (Czech Republic) Petr Nouza (Czech Republic) Patrik Rikl
- Runners-up: (France) Antoine Escoffier (United Kingdom) Joshua Paris
- Score: 6–3, 7–6^{(7–3)}

Events
Singles	Doubles
- Lexus Nottingham Challenger

This was the first edition of the tournament.

Petr Nouza and Patrik Rikl won the title after defeating Antoine Escoffier and Joshua Paris 6–3, 7–6^{(7–3)} in the final.

== Seeds ==
1. (Sweden) Filip Bergevi / (Netherlands) Mick Veldheer (quarterfinals)
2. (United Kingdom) Luke Johnson / (United Kingdom) Ben Jones (semifinals)
3. (Czech Republic) Zdeněk Kolář / (Poland) Szymon Walków (first round)
4. (United Kingdom) Scott Duncan / (United Kingdom) Marcus Willis (first round)

== Draw ==
Key

- Q = Qualifier
- WC = Wild card
- LL = Lucky loser
- Alt = Alternate
- ITF = ITF entry
- PR = Protected ranking
- SR = Special ranking
- SE = Special exempt
- JE = Junior exempt
- JR = Junior Accelerator Programme entrant
- CO = College Accelerator Programme entrant
- NG = Next Gen Accelerator Program entrant
- w/o = Walkover
- r = Retired
- d = Defaulted

First round
1	(Sweden) F Bergevi (Netherlands) M Veldheer	7^{7}	6
(Italy) M Bellucci (Italy) F Maestrelli	6^{3}	3
(Switzerland) R Bertola (Italy) G Ricca	2	4
(France) A Escoffier (United Kingdom) J Paris	6	6
3	(Czech Republic) Z Kolář (Poland) S Walków	2	4
(France) T Lamasine (France) M Martineau	6	6
WC	(United Kingdom) James Davis (United Kingdom) H Stewart	2	6	[9]
(United Kingdom) B Harris (United Kingdom) R Peniston	6	3	[11]
WC	(United Kingdom) George Houghton (United Kingdom) G Hussey	6	3	[7]
PR	(Zimbabwe) CJ Lock (Canada) K Stevenson	3	6	[10]
(Czech Republic) P Nouza (Czech Republic) P Rikl	6	6
4	(United Kingdom) S Duncan (United Kingdom) M Willis	3	1
(United States) C Harrison (United Kingdom) A McHugh	6	3	[10]
Alt	(France) G Mpetshi Perricard (Jordan) A Shelbayh	4	6	[7]
Alt	(Poland) F Peliwo (Czech Republic) D Poljak	1	2
2	(United Kingdom) L Johnson (United Kingdom) B Jones	6	6

Quarterfinals
1	(Sweden) F Bergevi (Netherlands) M Veldheer	6^{3}	7	[4]
(France) A Escoffier (United Kingdom) J Paris	7^{7}	5	[10]
(France) T Lamasine (France) M Martineau	3	6	[5]
(United Kingdom) B Harris (United Kingdom) R Peniston	6	1	[10]
PR	(Zimbabwe) CJ Lock (Canada) K Stevenson	1	0
(Czech Republic) P Nouza (Czech Republic) P Rikl	6	6
(United States) C Harrison (United Kingdom) A McHugh	4	6^{5}
2	(United Kingdom) L Johnson (United Kingdom) B Jones	6	7^{7}

Semifinals
(France) A Escoffier (United Kingdom) J Paris	6	6
(United Kingdom) B Harris (United Kingdom) R Peniston	4	2
(Czech Republic) P Nouza (Czech Republic) P Rikl	6^{5}	6	[10]
2	(United Kingdom) L Johnson (United Kingdom) B Jones	7^{7}	3	[8]

Final
(France) A Escoffier (United Kingdom) J Paris	3	6^{3}
(Czech Republic) P Nouza (Czech Republic) P Rikl	6	7^{7}
