= 2025 Lexus Nottingham Challenger II – Doubles =

Doubles
- 2025 Lexus Nottingham Challenger II

Final
- Champions: (United Kingdom) Scott Duncan (United Kingdom) James MacKinlay
- Runners-up: (United Kingdom) Charles Broom (United Kingdom) Mark Whitehouse
- Score: 7–5, 4–6, [20–18]

Events
Singles	Doubles
- Lexus Nottingham Challenger

Jonáš Forejtek and Michael Vrbenský were the defending champions but chose not to defend their title.

Scott Duncan and James MacKinlay won the title after defeating Charles Broom and Mark Whitehouse 7–5, 4–6, [20–18] in the final.

== Seeds ==
1. (United Kingdom) Charles Broom / (United Kingdom) Mark Whitehouse (final)
2. (Finland) Patrick Kaukovalta / (Finland) Patrik Niklas-Salminen (quarterfinals)
3. (United Kingdom) Tom Hands / (United Kingdom) Harry Wendelken (semifinals)
4. (United Kingdom) Scott Duncan / (United Kingdom) James MacKinlay (champions)

== Draw ==
Key

- Q = Qualifier
- WC = Wild card
- LL = Lucky loser
- Alt = Alternate
- ITF = ITF entry
- PR = Protected ranking
- SR = Special ranking
- SE = Special exempt
- JE = Junior exempt
- JR = Junior Accelerator Programme entrant
- CO = College Accelerator Programme entrant
- NG = Next Gen Accelerator Program entrant
- w/o = Walkover
- r = Retired
- d = Defaulted

=== Draw ===
First round
1	(United Kingdom) C Broom (United Kingdom) M Whitehouse	7^{7}	6
(United Kingdom) F Bass (United Kingdom) Liam Hignett	6^{4}	1
(France) M Martineau (France) A Reymond	6	6
(India) A Kalyanpur (India) D Sharan	3	3
3	(United Kingdom) T Hands (United Kingdom) H Wendelken	2	6	[10]
WC	(United Kingdom) L Pow (United Kingdom) Charlie Robertson	6	2	[6]
PR	(France) K de Schepper; I Ivashka	4	2
(United Kingdom) L Broady (United Kingdom) B Jones	6	6
(United Kingdom) James Story (United Kingdom) M Summers	6	7^{7}
(France) M Janvier (Italy) Augusto Virgili	3	6^{4}
(Norway) N Budkov Kjær (Norway) L Hellum Lilleengen	2	2
4	(United Kingdom) S Duncan (United Kingdom) J MacKinlay	6	6
Alt	(Czech Republic) Jan Hrazdil (Germany) P Zahraj	6	6
(Germany) Niklas Schell (United Kingdom) H Stewart	2	2
WC	(United Kingdom) L Maxted (United Kingdom) C Thomson
2	(Finland) Patrick Kaukovalta (Finland) P Niklas-Salminen	w/o

Quarterfinals
1	(United Kingdom) C Broom (United Kingdom) M Whitehouse	6	7^{15}
(France) M Martineau (France) A Reymond	4	6^{13}
3	(United Kingdom) T Hands (United Kingdom) H Wendelken	6	7^{7}
(United Kingdom) L Broady (United Kingdom) B Jones	3	6^{5}
(United Kingdom) J Story (United Kingdom) M Summers	3	6	[8]
4	(United Kingdom) S Duncan (United Kingdom) J MacKinlay	6	1	[10]
Alt	(Czech Republic) J Hrazdil (Germany) P Zahraj	6	7^{7}
2	(Finland) P Kaukovalta (Finland) P Niklas-Salminen	2	6^{4}

Semifinals
1	(United Kingdom) C Broom (United Kingdom) M Whitehouse	7^{7}	5	[10]
3	(United Kingdom) T Hands (United Kingdom) H Wendelken	6^{5}	7	[6]
4	(United Kingdom) S Duncan (United Kingdom) J MacKinlay	w/o
Alt	(Czech Republic) J Hrazdil (Germany) P Zahraj

Final
1	(United Kingdom) C Broom (United Kingdom) M Whitehouse	5	6	[18]
4	(United Kingdom) S Duncan (United Kingdom) J MacKinlay	7	4	[20]
