= 2025 Lexus Nottingham Challenger – Singles =

Singles
- 2025 Lexus Nottingham Challenger

Final
- Champion: (Norway) Viktor Durasovic
- Runner-up: (United Kingdom) Henry Searle
- Score: 7–6^{(8–6)}, 3–6, 6–1

Events
Singles	Doubles
- Lexus Nottingham Challenger

Giovanni Mpetshi Perricard was the defending champion but chose not to defend his title.

Viktor Durasovic won the title after defeating Henry Searle 7–6^{(8–6)}, 3–6, 6–1 in the final.

== Seeds ==
1. (Jordan) Abdullah Shelbayh (first round)
2. (Lithuania) Edas Butvilas (first round)
3. (United Kingdom) Jay Clarke (first round)
4. (United States) Aidan Mayo (first round)
5. (Croatia) Dino Prižmić (second round)
6. (Croatia) Mili Poljičak (first round)
7. (Belgium) Michael Geerts (first round)
8. (Luxembourg) Chris Rodesch (quarterfinals)

== Draw ==
Key

- Q = Qualifier
- WC = Wild card
- LL = Lucky loser
- Alt = Alternate
- ITF = ITF entry
- PR = Protected ranking
- SR = Special ranking
- SE = Special exempt
- JE = Junior exempt
- JR = Junior Accelerator Programme entrant
- CO = College Accelerator Programme entrant
- NG = Next Gen Accelerator Program entrant
- w/o = Walkover
- r = Retired
- d = Defaulted

=== Finals ===
Semifinals
WC	(United Kingdom) Henry Searle	6	6^{4}	7^{7}
(Switzerland) Mika Brunold	2	7^{7}	6^{4}
WC	(United Kingdom) Anton Matusevich	3	5
(Norway) Viktor Durasovic	6	7

Final
WC	(United Kingdom) Henry Searle	6^{6}	6	1
(Norway) Viktor Durasovic	7^{8}	3	6

=== Top half ===
First round
1	(Jordan) A Shelbayh	5	2
Q	(Slovakia) L Pokorný	7	6
(Slovakia) M Karol	6	7^{7}
Q	(Germany) P Zahraj	4	6^{3}
Q	(Norway) N Budkov Kjær	2	5
(Bulgaria) D Kuzmanov	6	7
WC	(United Kingdom) H Searle	7^{7}	7
7	(Belgium) M Geerts	6^{4}	5
4	(United States) A Mayo	3	7^{8}	3
(Austria) S Kopp	6	6^{6}	6
Q	(France) Alexis Gautier	3	4
(Switzerland) M Brunold	6	6
(United Kingdom) J Monday	2	7	6
WC	(United Kingdom) R Peniston	6	5	3
(Netherlands) Ryan Nijboer	6	5	4
8	(Luxembourg) C Rodesch	4	7	6

Second round
Q	(Slovakia) L Pokorný	6	4	6
(Slovakia) M Karol	4	6	2
(Bulgaria) D Kuzmanov	6^{5}	2
WC	(United Kingdom) H Searle	7^{7}	6
(Austria) S Kopp	4	6^{5}
(Switzerland) M Brunold	6	7^{7}
(United Kingdom) J Monday	4	6^{4}
8	(Luxembourg) C Rodesch	6	7^{7}

Quarterfinals
Q	(Slovakia) L Pokorný	2	4
WC	(United Kingdom) H Searle	6	6
(Switzerland) M Brunold	6	6
8	(Luxembourg) C Rodesch	4	4

Semifinals
WC	(United Kingdom) H Searle	6	6^{4}	7^{7}
(Switzerland) M Brunold	2	7^{7}	6^{4}

=== Bottom half ===
First round
5	(Croatia) D Prižmić	6	7^{7}
PR	(North Macedonia) K Ivanovski	3	6^{3}
(France) Jules Marie	3	3
WC	(United Kingdom) A Matusevich	6	6
(Czech Republic) J Forejtek	7^{7}	3	1
(Croatia) L Mikrut	6^{2}	6	6
LL	(Slovakia) N Gombos	2	7	6
3	(United Kingdom) J Clarke	6	5	2
6	(Croatia) M Poljičak	5	4
(Norway) V Durasovic	7	6
(Czech Republic) M Vrbenský	3	6^{4}
(Austria) F Misolic	6	7^{7}
Q	(Italy) R Brancaccio	6	6
Q	(France) T Lamasine	4	2
(Austria) D Novak	7^{7}	6
2	(Lithuania) E Butvilas	6^{3}	3

Second round
5	(Croatia) D Prižmić	3	4
WC	(United Kingdom) A Matusevich	6	6
(Croatia) L Mikrut	4	2
LL	(Slovakia) N Gombos	6	6
(Norway) V Durasovic	6	6
(Austria) F Misolic	3	2
Q	(Italy) R Brancaccio	3	7^{7}	4
(Austria) D Novak	6	6^{5}	6

Quarterfinals
WC	(United Kingdom) A Matusevich	4	6	6
LL	(Slovakia) N Gombos	6	4	3
(Norway) V Durasovic	6	6^{2}	6
(Austria) D Novak	3	7^{7}	4

Semifinals
WC	(United Kingdom) A Matusevich	3	5
(Norway) V Durasovic	6	7
