= 2025 Lexus Nottingham Challenger =

- Date: 6–11 January
- Edition: 2nd
- Surface: Hard (indoor)
- Location: Nottingham, United Kingdom

Champions

Singles
- (Norway) Viktor Durasovic

Doubles
- (Czech Republic) Jonáš Forejtek / (Czech Republic) Michael Vrbenský
- Lexus Nottingham Challenger

The 2025 Lexus Nottingham Challenger was a professional tennis tournament played on indoor hard courts. It was the second edition of the tournament which was part of the 2025 ATP Challenger Tour. It took place in Nottingham, United Kingdom between 6 and 11 January 2025.

== Singles main-draw entrants ==
=== Seeds ===
Country	Player	Rank^{1}	Seed
JOR	Abdullah Shelbayh	250	1
LTU	Edas Butvilas	252	2
GBR	Jay Clarke	264	3
USA	Aidan Mayo	271	4
CRO	Dino Prižmić	292	5
CRO	Mili Poljičak	295	6
BEL	Michael Geerts	298	7
LUX	Chris Rodesch	300	8

- ^{1} Rankings are as of 30 December 2024.

=== Other entrants ===
The following players received wildcards into the singles main draw:

- (United Kingdom) Anton Matusevich
- (United Kingdom) Ryan Peniston
- (United Kingdom) Henry Searle

The following player received entry into the singles main draw using a protected ranking:

- (North Macedonia) Kalin Ivanovski

The following players received entry from the qualifying draw:

- (Italy) Raúl Brancaccio
- (Norway) Nicolai Budkov Kjær
- (France) Alexis Gautier
- (France) Tristan Lamasine
- (Slovakia) Lukáš Pokorný
- (Germany) Patrick Zahraj

The following player received entry as a lucky loser:

- (Slovakia) Norbert Gombos

== Champions ==
=== Singles ===
- (Norway) Viktor Durasovic def. (United Kingdom) Henry Searle 7–6^{(8–6)}, 3–6, 6–1.

=== Doubles ===
- (Czech Republic) Jonáš Forejtek / (Czech Republic) Michael Vrbenský def. (Czech Republic) Jiří Barnat / (Czech Republic) Filip Duda 7–6^{(7–5)}, 7–6^{(7–5)}.
