= Sport pedagogy =

Pedagogical discipline

Sport Pedagogy is the academic field of study, which is located at the intersection between sport and education. As a discipline, sport pedagogy is concerned with learning, teaching and instruction in sport, physical education and related areas of physical activity. Whilst sport pedagogy is mostly regarded as a sub-discipline of sport science (in North America frequently referred to as kinesiology), its theoretical grounding is also underpinned by the general education sciences. Sport pedagogy is therefore allied to both fields of sport science and education.

== Etymology and Context ==
In its original meaning the word pedagogy, relates to the purposeful development of children and young people. The word pedagogy derives from the Greek (pais=’child’; agogein=’to lead’; ‘to instruct’) and implies the purposeful art of leading, educating, or teaching young people. In recognition of the fact that humans are lifelong learners and also potentially engaged in lifelong physical activity, current definitions of sport pedagogy favor a broader view within a sport context. To reflect this, the term sport pedagogy is used more holistically to include pedagogies that relate to adult learning and participation in sport and physical activity across all age ranges.

== Historical background ==
Historically, the roots of sport pedagogy as an academic sub-discipline in accordance to sport science can be traced back to the systematic study of physical education as a subject. As an academic discipline, sport pedagogy was first explicitly recognized during the late 1960s in continental Europe where the discipline was seen to provide a theoretical framework for the planning and teaching of physical education in schools. In Germany for instance, the publication of Ommo Grupe's influential book ‘Grundlagen der Sportpädagogik’ (Foundations of Sport Pedagogy) provided a key moment in defining the concepts and content of sport pedagogy as an academic subject. It also provided the impetus for further research in this field and by the end of the 1970s, as professorships in sport pedagogy were well established in sport and exercise science departments throughout Germany Universities.

In the English speaking world, the recognition of sport pedagogy as a discipline is far more recent. In 1989, the notable German researcher Herbert Haag observed that the meaning of the term 'sport pedagogy' was not fully established in English speaking sport science literature. Haag confirmed the ascendence and usefulness of the term 'sport pedagogy' to communicate about research in learning and teaching in physical education and sport to international academic audiences in this field. The relatively late adoption of the term 'sport pedagogy' present in English academic literature is too observed by the distinguished Australian researcher Richard Tinning (2008, p. 405) who notes that 'not with standing the fact that our European colleagues had been using the terms pedagogy and sport pedagogy for many years, the English-speaking world of kinesiology has only relatively recently embraced the terms.’ Nonetheless, Tinning observes that sport pedagogy is now ‘firmly established as a credible academic sub-discipline’.

== Sport pedagogy as a discipline and as a field of study ==
While research in sport pedagogy and research in the field of physical education continue to overlap, sport pedagogy is now seen to be the overarching academic discipline, informing learning, teaching and instruction in a wide range of sport, physical activity and exercise contexts. At the centre of the inquiry is the pedagogical encounter between the teacher/coach/instructor and the learner/participant. In this, it is the purpose of sport pedagogy 'to support the needs of learners in sport, and other forms of physical activity, wherever and whenever they seek to learn through the life-course'. To achieve this end, sport pedagogy researchers should be encouraged to engage in inter-disciplinary work, in order to transcend the respective academic silos that sometimes exist between the distinct sub-disciplines in sport science.

== Current developments ==
The focus on learning in a sports context is the importance of relevance while teaching. In order to be relevant, depending on the process of learning in a sports discipline, rather than its product. <Light, R., & Dixon, M. A. (2007). Contemporary Developments in Sport Pedagogy and their Implications for Sport Management Education. Sport Management Review, 10(2), 159–175.. Sports Pedagogy is a narrow definition of a much broader discipline of study, it can be conceptualized into smaller and more diverse fields of study. Shown in modern day management, teaching, coaching, and professional settings. In fact the absorption of other academic fields adds significant value into the development of understanding an educational sports domain <Light, R., & Dixon, M. A. (2007). Contemporary Developments in Sport Pedagogy and their Implications for Sport Management Education. Sport Management Review, 10(2), 159–175..
