= Clément Chidekh =

French tennis player (born 2001)

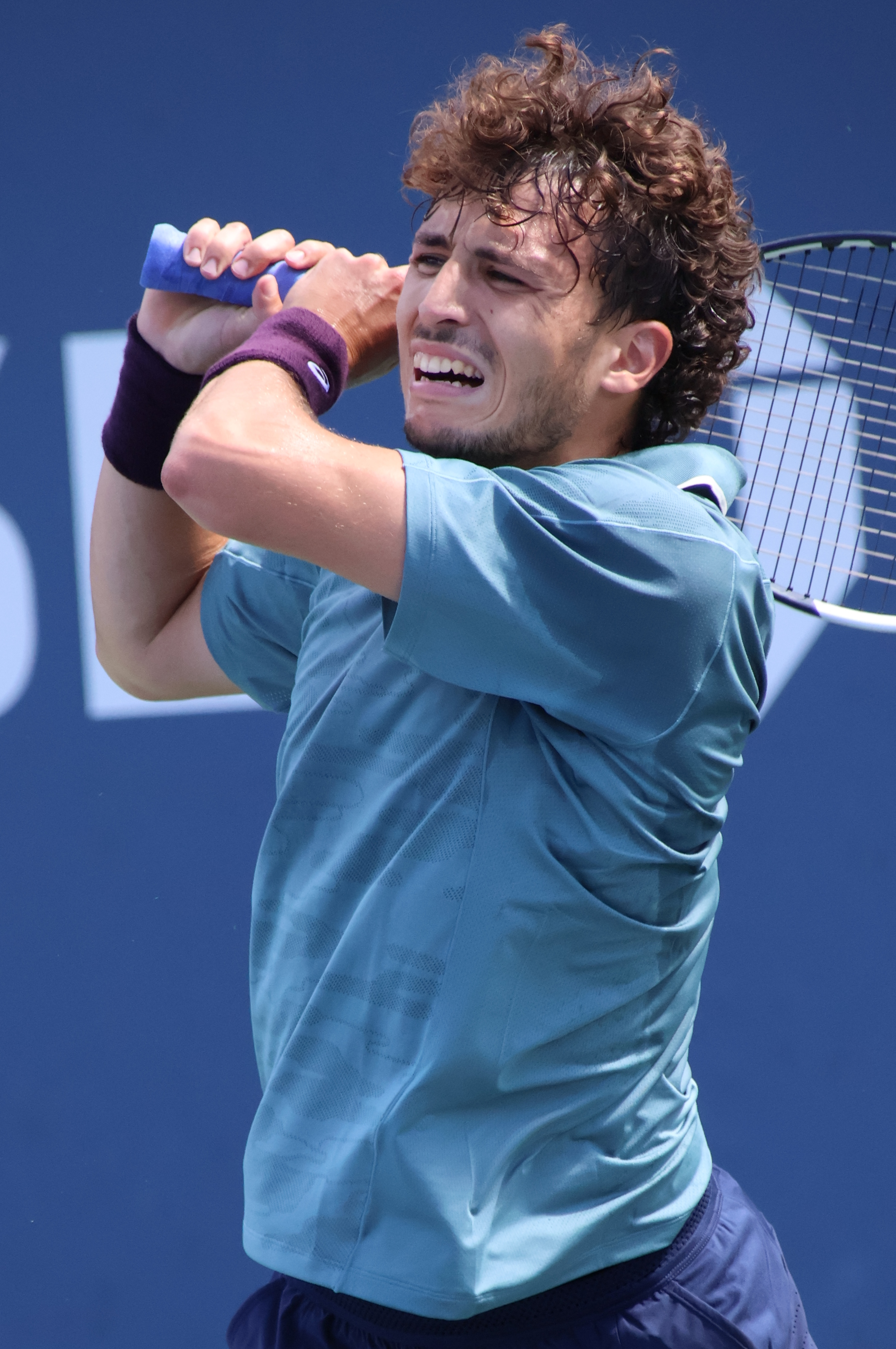
- Chidekh at the 2026 US Open
- Country (sports): France
- Born: 13 June 2001 (age 25) Arles, France
- Height: 1.80 m (5 ft 11 in)
- Turned pro: 2022
- Plays: Right-handed (two-handed backhand)
- College: University of Washington
- Coach: Matt Anger, Lionel Zimbler, Vivien Cabos, Julien Gillet
- Prize money: US $595,116

Singles
- Career record: 2–3 (at ATP Tour level, Grand Slam level, and in Davis Cup)
- Career titles: 0
- Highest ranking: No. 116 (16 November 2026)
- Current ranking: No. 116 (16 November 2026)

Grand Slam singles results
- Australian Open: Q3 (2025)
- French Open: Q1 (2024, 2026)
- Wimbledon: Q1 (2026)
- US Open: Q2 (2026)

Doubles
- Career record: 1–2 (at ATP Tour level, Grand Slam level, and in Davis Cup)
- Career titles: 0
- Highest ranking: No. 192 (16 February 2026)
- Current ranking: No. 455 (16 November 2026)

Grand Slam doubles results
- French Open: 1R (2026)
- Last updated on: 16 November 2026.

Clément Chidekh (born 13 June 2001) is a French tennis player. He has a career-high ATP singles ranking of world No. 116 achieved on 16 November 2026 and a career-high ATP doubles ranking of No. 192 achieved on 16 February 2026.

Chidekh played college tennis at the University of Washington.

== Professional career ==
=== 2021: First ITF title ===
In June 2021, Chidekh won his first ITF title in Ajaccio, France, defeating Petros Tsitsipas in the final.

=== 2023: ATP Tour debut ===
In February, Chidekh made his ATP main draw debut at the 2023 Open Sud de France in Montpellier, France as a qualifier, losing to fellow countryman Quentin Halys in the first round.

=== 2024: Maiden Challenger title, Top 200 ===
In February, Chidekh won his first title on the ATP Challenger Tour at the 2024 Glasgow Challenger, defeating Paul Jubb in the final. The following month, he reached his second Challenger final in Hamburg, losing to Henri Squire in the final. As a result, he reached the top 300 in the ATP singles rankings on 18 March 2024. Chidekh reached the top 200 on 14 October 2024.

=== 2025: Second Challenger title ===
In February, Chidekh entered his second career ATP Tour-level main draw at the 2025 Open 13 Provence in Marseille, France as a qualifier, losing to Zizou Bergs in the first round of the main draw.

In May, Chidekh won his second Challenger title at the 2025 Moldova Open, defeating Ilia Simakin in the final.

=== 2026: Four Challenger titles, First ATP quarterfinal, top 120 ===
In January, Chidekh won his third Challenger title in Nottingham, defeating top seed Johannus Monday in the final. The following week, Chidekh won his fourth Challenger title in Glasgow defeating Mikhail Kukushkin in the final.

In September, Chidekh won his third Challenger title of the season at the Open de Vendée, defeating Sascha Gueymard Wayenburg in the final. As a result, he entered the top 150 on 5 October 2026.

In October, Chidekh won his first two ATP Tour-level singles matches at the European Open in Brussels. He entered the main draw as a qualifier and defeated seventh seed Botic van de Zandschulp, for his first top 50 win, and Jacob Fearnley in the second round to reach his first tour-level quarterfinal. As a result he reached a new career-high singles ranking in the top 135 on 26 October 2026.

In November, Chidekh won his fourth Challenger title of the season at the Knoxville Challenger, defeating Abdullah Shelbayh in the final. As a result, he entered the top 120 on 16 November 2026.

== Performance timeline ==
Key
W	F	SF	QF	#R	RR	Q#	DNQ	A	NH

(W) winner; (F) finalist; (SF) semifinalist; (QF) quarterfinalist; (#R) rounds 4, 3, 2, 1; (RR) round-robin stage; (Q#) qualification round; (DNQ) did not qualify; (A) absent; (NH) not held; (SR) strike rate (events won / competed); (W–L) win–loss record.

=== Singles ===
Tournament	2024	2025	2026	2027	SR	W–L	Win%
Grand Slam tournaments
Australian Open	A	Q3	A		0 / 0	0–0	–
French Open	Q1	A	Q1		0 / 0	0–0	–
Wimbledon	A	A	A		0 / 0	0–0	–
US Open	A	Q1	Q2		0 / 0	0–0	–
Win–loss	0–0	0–0	0–0	0–0	0 / 0	0–0	–

== ATP Challenger Tour finals ==
=== Singles: 8 (6 titles, 2 runner-ups) ===
Legend (singles) ATP Challenger Tour (6–2)	Titles by surface Hard (6–1) Clay (0–0) Grass (0–1)

Result	W–L	Date	Tournament	Tier	Surface	Opponent	Score
Win	1–0	Feb 2024	Glasgow, UK	Challenger	Hard (i)	(United Kingdom) Paul Jubb	0–6, 6–4, 6–1
Loss	1–1	Mar 2024	Hamburg, Germany	Challenger	Hard (i)	(Germany) Henri Squire	4–6, 2–6
Win	2–1	May 2025	Chisinau, Moldova	Challenger	Hard	Ilia Simakin	7–6^{(8–6)}, 7–5
Win	3–1	Jan 2026	Nottingham, UK	Challenger	Hard (i)	(United Kingdom) Johannus Monday	5–7, 6–2, 7–6^{(7–5)}
Win	4–1	Jan 2026	Glasgow, UK	Challenger	Hard (i)	(Kazakhstan) Mikhail Kukushkin	5–7, 6–1, 4–0 ret.
Loss	4–2	Jul 2026	Nottingham, UK	Challenger	Grass	(United Kingdom) Henry Searle	4–6, 4–6
Win	5–2	Sep 2026	Mouilleron-le-Captif, France	Challenger	Hard (i)	(France) Sascha Gueymard Wayenburg	6–2, 6–0
Win	6–2	Nov 2026	Knoxville, US	Challenger	Hard (i)	(Jordan) Abdullah Shelbayh	6–1, 2–0 ret.

== ITF Tour finals ==
=== Singles: 15 (10 titles, 5 runner-ups) ===
Legend (singles) ITF World Tennis Tour (10–5)	Titles by surface Hard (10–5) Clay (0–0)

Result	W–L	Date	Tournament	Tier	Surface	Opponent	Score
Win	1–0	Jul 2021	M25+H Ajaccio, France	World Tour	Hard	(Greece) Petros Tsitsipas	6–3, 6–0
Loss	1–1	Aug 2021	M15 Castelo Branco, Portugal	World Tennis Tour	Hard	(Brazil) Gilbert Klier Júnior	2–6, 1–6
Win	2–1	Jun 2022	M25 Wichita, USA	World Tennis Tour	Hard	(Canada) Liam Draxl	6–2, 6–2
Win	3–1	Jan 2023	M25 Loughborough, UK	World Tennis Tour	Hard (i)	(United Kingdom) George Loffhagen	6–4, 6–2
Win	4–1	Jan 2023	M25 Sunderland, UK	World Tennis Tour	Hard (i)	(United Kingdom) Anton Matusevich	Walkover
Win	5–1	Apr 2023	M25 Saint-Dizier, France	World Tennis Tour	Hard	(Uzbekistan) Khumoyun Sultanov	7–6^{(7–4)}, 6–1
Win	6–1	Feb 2024	M15 Grenoble, France	World Tennis Tour	Hard (i)	(France) Antoine Hoang	6–3, 2–6, 6–3
Win	7–1	Mar 2024	M25 Toulouse-Balma, France	World Tennis Tour	Hard (i)	(France) Maxime Janvier	6–3, 6–2
Win	8–1	Jun 2024	M25 Bakio, Spain	World Tennis Tour	Hard	(France) Robin Bertrand	7–6^{(7–3)}, 6–3
Loss	8–2	Aug 2024	M15 Budapest, Hungary	World Tennis Tour	Hard	(Estonia) Daniil Glinka	4–6, 3–6
Loss	8–3	Sep 2024	M25 Bagnères de Bigorre, France	World Tennis Tour	Hard	Marat Sharipov	2–6, 7–6^{(7–2)}, 6–7^{(3–7)}
Loss	8–4	Sep 2024	M25 Plaisir, France	World Tennis Tour	Hard	(France) Antoine Cornut-Chauvinc	4–6, 1–1 RET
Loss	8–5	Jun 2025	M25 Martos, Spain	World Tennis Tour	Hard	(United States) Darwin Blanch	6–7^{(4–7)}, 3–6
Win	9–5	Jun 2025	M25 Bakio, Spain	World Tennis Tour	Hard	(Colombia) Adrià Soriano Barrera	6–0, 6–2
Win	10–5	Sep 2026	M25 Plaisir, France	World Tennis Tour	Hard	(United States) Samir Banerjee	7–6^{(7–5)}, 6–1
