= Scott Duncan (tennis) =

British tennis player (born 1994)

- Country (sports): United Kingdom
- Born: 21 August 1994 (age 32) Edinburgh, United Kingdom
- Height: 1.75 m (5 ft 9 in)
- Plays: Right-handed (two-handed backhand)
- Prize money: $55,848

Singles
- Career record: 0–0
- Career titles: 0
- Highest ranking: No. 1,274 (19 August 2019)

Doubles
- Career record: 0–0
- Career titles: 3 Challenger, 9 ITF
- Highest ranking: No. 167 (26 August 2024)
- Current ranking: No. 199 (2 December 2024)
- Last updated on: 2 December 2024.

Scott Duncan (born 21 August 1994) is a British tennis player who specializes in doubles. He has a career high ATP doubles ranking of world No. 167, achieved on 26 August 2024.

== Career ==
He won his first ATP Challenger title in doubles at the 2023 Maspalomas Challenger, partnering Marcus Willis. Duncan and Willis also combined to win the doubles title at the 2024 Glasgow Challenger. Teaming up with James MacKinlay, he won his third Challenger doubles title at the 2025 Lexus Nottingham Challenger II.

== Personal life ==
Duncan is a graduate of the University of Stirling.

== ATP Challenger and ITF Tour finals ==
=== Doubles: 25 (13–12) ===
| Legend ATP Challenger Tour (3–3) ITF Futures/World Tennis Tour (10–9) | Finals by surface Hard (9–9) Clay (2–2) Grass (1–0) Carpet (1–1) |

| Result | W–L | Date | Tournament | Tier | Surface | Partner | Opponents | Score |
|---|---|---|---|---|---|---|---|---|
| Loss | 0–1 | Jun 2017 | Colombo, Sri Lanka | Futures | Clay | (France) Nicolas Rosenzweig | (United States) Nicholas Bybel (Lebanon) Giovani Samaha | 1–6, 2–6 |
| Loss | 0–2 | Feb 2018 | Djerba, Tunisia | Futures | Hard | (United Kingdom) Jonathan Binding | (France) Sébastien Boltz (France) Matteo Martineau | 2–6, 2–6 |
| Loss | 0–3 | Jun 2018 | Kiryat Shmona, Israel | Futures | Hard | (United States) Conor Berg | (Italy) Francesco Ferrari (Italy) Francesco Vilardo | 1–6, 2–6 |
| Win | 1–3 | Aug 2018 | Minsk, Belarus | Futures | Hard | (United States) Conor Berg | (Czech Republic) Marek Gengel (Czech Republic) David Poljak | 7–6^{(7–1)}, 6–4 |
| Win | 2–3 | Sep 2018 | Nottingham, Great Britain | Futures | Hard | (United Kingdom) Jonathan Binding | (Estonia) Daniil Glinka (Estonia) Karl Kiur Saar | 6–2, 7–6^{(8–6)} |
| Loss | 2–4 | Apr 2019 | Sunderland, Great Britain | Futures | Hard (i) | (Republic of Ireland) Peter Bothwell | (United States) Hunter Johnson (United States) Yates Johnson | 4–6, 3–6 |
| Loss | 2–5 | Nov 2021 | Opava, Czech Republic M15 | World Tour | Carpet (i) | (Czech Republic) Dominik Kellovský | (Poland) Michał Dembek (Czech Republic) Petr Nouza | 7–5, 4–6, [8–10] |
| Loss | 2–6 | Feb 2022 | Torelló, Spain M15 | World Tour | Hard | (Czech Republic) Dominik Kellovský | (France) Théo Arribagé (France) Luca Sanchez | 5–7, 7–5, [8–10] |
| Win | 3–6 | Sep 2022 | Madrid, Spain M25 | World Tour | Clay | (United Kingdom) Marcus Willis | (Morocco) Lamine Ouahab (Algeria) Mohamed Nazim Makhlouf | 6–1, 6–3 |
| Win | 4–6 | Oct 2022 | Sarreguemines, France M25 | World Tour | Carpet (i) | (United Kingdom) Marcus Willis | (France) Grégoire Jacq (France) Arthur Bouquier | 4–6, 6–3, [10–8] |
| Win | 5–6 | Nov 2022 | Villers-lès-Nancy, France M15 | World Tour | Hard (i) | (United Kingdom) Marcus Willis | (France) Grégoire Jacq (France) Arthur Bouquier | 6–1, 2–0 ret. |
| Loss | 5–7 | Dec 2022 | Sharm El Sheikh, Egypt M15 | World Tour | Hard | (Canada) Kelsey Stevenson | Semen Voronin; Petr Bar Biryukov | 2–6, 7–6^{(7–3)}, [7–10] |
| Win | 6–7 | Dec 2022 | Sharm El Sheikh, Egypt M15 | World Tour | Hard | (Canada) Kelsey Stevenson | Yan Bondarevskiy; Alexandr Binda | 6–4, 6–4 |
| Win | 7–7 | Jan 2023 | Sheffield, Great Britain M25 | World Tour | Hard (i) | (United Kingdom) Marcus Willis | (France) Corentin Denolly (Sweden) Simon Freund | 6–3, 6–4 |
| Win | 8–7 | Feb 2023 | Bath, Great Britain M25 | World Tour | Hard (i) | (United Kingdom) Marcus Willis | (United Kingdom) Ben Jones (United Kingdom) Daniel Little | 6–3, 6–4 |
| Loss | 8–8 | Mar 2023 | Montreal, Canada M25 | World Tour | Hard (i) | (United Kingdom) Marcus Willis | (Canada) Juan Carlos Aguilar (United Kingdom) Joe Tyler | 4–6, 7–5, [9–11] |
| Win | 9–8 | May 2023 | Nottingham, Great Britain M25 | World Tour | Hard | (United Kingdom) Marcus Willis | (United Kingdom) Giles Hussey (United Kingdom) Ben Jones | 6–3, 6–2 |
| Win | 10–8 | Dec 2023 | Maspalomas, Spain | Challenger | Clay | (United Kingdom) Marcus Willis | (France) Théo Arribagé (France) Sadio Doumbia | 7–6^{(7–5)}, 6–4 |
| Win | 11–8 | Feb 2024 | Glasgow, United Kingdom | Challenger | Hard (i) | (United Kingdom) Marcus Willis | (United Kingdom) Kyle Edmund (United Kingdom) Henry Searle | 6–3, 6–2 |
| Win | 12–8 | Jul 2025 | Nottingham, United Kingdom | Challenger | Grass | (United Kingdom) James MacKinlay | (United Kingdom) Charles Broom (United Kingdom) Mark Whitehouse | 7–5, 4–6, [20–18] |
| Loss | 12–9 | Nov 2025 | Monastir, Tunisia M25 | World Tour | Hard | (United Kingdom) James MacKinlay | (Belgium) Buvaysar Gadamauri (United States) Mwendwa Mbithi | 6–7^{(4–7)}, 6–2, [8–10] |
| Loss | 12–10 | Feb 2026 | Metepec, Mexico | Challenger | Hard | (United Kingdom) Ben Jones | (United States) Pranav Kumar (United States) Karl Poling | 2–6, 3–6 |
| Win | 13–10 | Mar 2026 | Heraklion, Greece M25 | World Tour | Hard | (United Kingdom) Hamish Stewart | (United States) Alex Jones (United States) Miles Jones | 6–4, 6–2 |
| Loss | 13–11 | Jul 2026 | Bonn, Germany | Challenger | Clay | (Sweden) Adam Heinonen | (India) Vijay Sundar Prashanth (India) Ramkumar Ramanathan | 6–7(4–7), 3–6 |
| Loss | 13–12 | Sep 2026 | Mouilleron-le-Captif, France | Challenger | Hard (i) | (United Kingdom) Finn Bass | (United States) Karl Poling (United States) Joshua Sheehy | 6–7^{(4–7)}, 6–4, [3–10] |
