= Charles Broom =

British tennis player (born 1998)

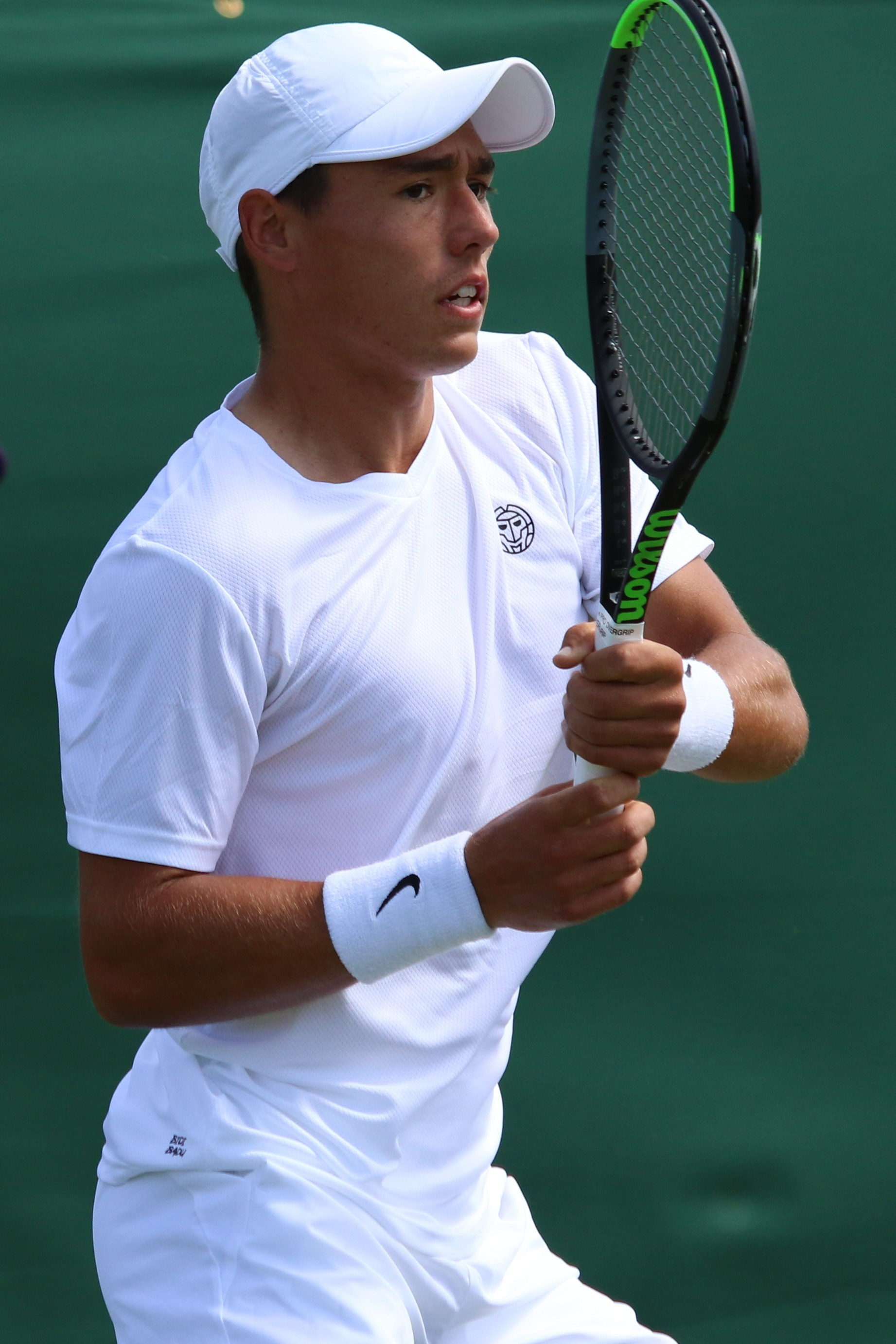
- Broom at 2022 Wimbledon qualifying
- Country (sports): United Kingdom
- Born: 24 April 1998 (age 28) St Albans, England
- Height: 1.78 m (5 ft 10 in)
- Plays: Right-handed (two-handed backhand)
- Prize money: US $436,018

Singles
- Career record: 0–2 (at ATP Tour level, Grand Slam level, and in Davis Cup)
- Career titles: 0
- Highest ranking: No. 235 (17 June 2024)
- Current ranking: No. 258 (24 August 2026)

Grand Slam singles results
- French Open: Q1 (2026)
- Wimbledon: 1R (2024)

Doubles
- Career record: 2–1 (at ATP Tour level, Grand Slam level, and in Davis Cup)
- Career titles: 0
- Highest ranking: No. 129 (23 September 2024)
- Current ranking: No. 294 (13 July 2026)

Grand Slam doubles results
- Wimbledon: 3R (2024)

Grand Slam mixed doubles results
- Wimbledon: 1R (2024)
- Last updated on: 15 July 2026.

Charles Broom (born 24 April 1998) is a British tennis player. He has a career high singles ranking of world No. 235 achieved on 17 June 2024 and a career high doubles ranking of No. 129 achieved on 23 September 2024.

== Early life ==
From Hertfordshire, Broom attended St Albans School. He went to Dartmouth College in Hanover, New Hampshire, and was a member of the Beta Alpha Omega fraternity. He later completed a master's degree in Sports Pedagogy at Baylor University.

== Career ==
=== 2022: Four doubles ITF titles ===
In January 2022 alongside Alastair Gray, Broom won an ITF doubles title in Bath, England. In April 2022 alongside Constantin Frantzen of Germany, Broom won the title at the ITF M15 Monastir. In May 2022 Broom won another doubles ITF M15 title in Heraklion alongside partner Julian Cash. In June 2022 Broom qualified for the Ilkley Trophy but lost in two tie-break sets to compatriot Daniel Cox. Broom was given a wildcard into qualifying for the Men's singles at the 2022 Wimbledon Championships but lost in straight sets to Bulgarian Dimitar Kuzmanov. In August 2022, he won another ITF doubles title alongside Luke Johnson in Nottingham.

=== 2024: Top 250, ATP and Major debuts ===
Alongside compatriot Ben Jones he won the final of the doubles event at the 2024 Kachreti Challenger on 25 May 2024.

In June 2024, he reached his first singles ATP Challenger final at the 2024 Nottingham Open, where he lost to compatriot Jacob Fearnley.

The following week at the 2024 Ilkley Trophy he defeated Mikhail Kukushkin and was awarded a wildcard into the 2024 Wimbledon Championships. He also reached the third round of the doubles tournament, partnering with Arthur Fery.

Ranked No. 245, he made his ATP debut at the 2024 Eastbourne International where he entered the main draw as a lucky loser directly into the second round, after the withdrawal of second seed Tommy Paul. He lost to compatriot and wildcard Billy Harris in three sets.

Broom won the doubles title at the 2024 Kozerki Open with David Stevenson.

=== 2025: United Cup ===
He played alongside Harris, and Katie Boulter representing Great Britain in the 2025 United Cup in Australia.

== ATP Challenger and ITF World Tennis Tour finals ==
=== Singles: 19 (10–9) ===
Legend ATP Challenger (0–2) ITF World Tennis Tour (10–7)	Finals by surface Hard (10–8) Clay (0–0) Grass (0–1)

Result	W–L	Date	Tournament	Tier	Surface	Opponent	Score
Win	1–0	Oct 2021	M15 Ithaca, United States	WTT	Hard	(United Kingdom) Henry Patten	6–7^{(5–7)}, 6–3, 6–4
Win	2–0	Nov 2021	M15 Heraklion, Greece	WTT	Hard	(United States) Kyle Seelig	6–3, 6–3
Loss	2–1	Jan 2022	M25 Bath, United Kingdom	WTT	Hard	(United Kingdom) Daniel Cox	4–6, 6–7^{(5–7)}
Loss	2–2	Mar 2022	M25 Calabasas, United States	WTT	Hard	(Australia) Rinky Hijikata	5–7, 2–6
Loss	2–3	May 2022	M15 Heraklion, Greece	WTT	Hard	(Australia) Omar Jasika	5–7, 3–6
Win	3–3	Aug 2022	M15 Helsinki, Finland	WTT	Hard	(Poland) Filip Peliwo	4–6, 6–4, 6–1
Loss	3–4	Jan 2023	M25 Sheffield, United Kingdom	WTT	Hard	(United Kingdom) Daniel Little	3–6, 4–6
Win	4–4	Oct 2023	M25 Saint-Augustin-de-Desmaures, Canada	WTT	Hard (i)	(Tunisia) Aziz Dougaz	6–7^{(5–7)}, 6–4, 6–2
Loss	4–5	Apr 2024	M25 Nottingham, United Kingdom	WTT	Hard	(United Kingdom) Paul Jubb	6–3, 2–6, 3–6
Win	5–5	Apr 2024	M25 Nottingham, United Kingdom	WTT	Hard	(United Kingdom) Henry Searle	6–3, 6–3
Loss	5–6	Jun 2024	Nottingham, United Kingdom	Challenger	Grass	(United Kingdom) Jacob Fearnley	6–4, 4–6, 3–6
Loss	5–7	May 2025	M25 Nottingham, United Kingdom	WTT	Hard	(United Kingdom) George Loffhagen	2–6, 2–6
Win	6–7	May 2025	M25 Nottingham, United Kingdom	WTT	Hard	(Italy) Fabrizio Andaloro	6–4, 6–3
Win	7–7	Jul 2025	M25 Castelo Branco, Portugal	WTT	Hard	(United States) Maxwell McKennon	6–2, 6–2
Win	8–7	Sep 2025	M25 Sapporo, Japan	WTT	Hard	(Japan) Kaichi Uchida	7–6^{(7–4)}, 7–5
Win	9–7	Jan 2026	M25 Glasgow, United Kingdom	WTT	Hard	(United Kingdom) Lui Maxted	6–4, 6–1
Loss	9–8	Mar 2026	M25 Créteil, France	WTT	Hard	(Germany) Marvin Möller	3–6, 2–6
Win	10–8	Aug 2026	M25 Roehampton, United Kingdom	WTT	Hard	(United Kingdom) Oliver Tarvet	6–3, 6–2
Loss	10–9	Aug 2026	Roehampton, United Kingdom	Challenger	Hard	(United Kingdom) George Loffhagen	5–7, 3–6

=== Doubles: 33 (17–16) ===
Legend ATP Challenger (3–5) ITF World Tennis Tour (14–11)	Finals by surface Hard (12–11) Clay (2–1) Grass (3–3) Carpet (0–1)

Result	W–L	Date	Tournament	Tier	Surface	Partner	Opponents	Score
Win	1–0	Aug 2017	Belgium F8; Eupen	Futures	Clay	(United States) Colin Sinclair	(Germany) Tom Schonenberg (Netherlands) Colin Van Beem	4–6, 6–1, [10–5]
Win	2–0	Nov 2020	M15 Fayetteville, United States	WTT	Hard	(Chile) Matías Soto	(Canada) Liam Draxl (United States) Aleksandar Kovacevic	2–6, 6–2, [10–5]
Win	3–0	Jul 2021	M15 Novi Sad, Serbia	WTT	Clay	(Czech Republic) Tadeas Paroulek	(Romania) Nicolae Frunză (Romania) Alexandru Jecan	2–6, 6–3, [10–6]
Win	4–0	Oct 2021	M15 Ithaca, United States	WTT	Hard	(United Kingdom) Henry Patten	(United States) Eduardo Nava (United States) Nathan Ponwith	7–6^{(8–6)}, 6–3
Loss	4–1	Nov 2021	M15 Fayetteville, United States	WTT	Hard	(United Kingdom) Henry Patten	(United States) George Goldhoff (Czech Republic) Tadeas Paroulek	4–6, 2–6
Win	5–1	Dec 2021	M15 Heraklion, Greece	WTT	Hard	(United Kingdom) Henry Patten	(Netherlands) Sidane Pontjodikromo (Germany) Kai Wehnelt	5–7, 6–2, [10–8]
Win	6–1	Jan 2022	M25 Bath, United Kingdom	WTT	Hard	(United Kingdom) Alastair Gray	(Netherlands) Guy den Ouden (United Kingdom) Luke Johnson	6–2, 6–2
Loss	6–2	Feb 2022	M25 Glasgow, United Kingdom	WTT	Hard	(Germany) Constantin Frantzen	(Netherlands) Gijs Brouwer (United Kingdom) Aidan McHugh	6–4, 6–7^{(1–7)}, [4–10]
Loss	6–3	Mar 2022	M25 Calabasas, United States	WTT	Hard	(United Kingdom) Henry Patten	(South Korea) Nam Ji-sung (South Korea) Song Min-kyu	3–6, 6–7^{(4–7)}
Win	7–3	April 2022	M15 Monastir, Tunisia	WTT	Hard	(Germany) Constantin Frantzen	(China) Li Zhe (China) Bu Yunchaokete	7–5, 2–6, [10–8]
Loss	7–4	May 2022	M15 Nottingham, United Kingdom	WTT	Hard	(United Kingdom) Jan Choinski	(United Kingdom) Julian Cash (United Kingdom) Henry Patten	6–7^{(5–7)}, 2–6
Win	8–4	May 2022	M15 Heraklion, Greece	WTT	Hard	(United Kingdom) Julian Cash	(Italy) Gabriele Bosio (United Kingdom) Mark Whitehouse	7–5, 6–4
Loss	8–5	Jul 2022	M25 Nottingham, United Kingdom	WTT	Grass	(United Kingdom) Luke Johnson	(United Kingdom) Alastair Gray (United Kingdom) Stuart Parker	6–7^{(4–7)}, 6–4, [5–10]
Win	9–5	Aug 2022	M25 Nottingham, United Kingdom	WTT	Grass	(United Kingdom) Luke Johnson	(United Kingdom) Ben Jones (United Kingdom) Joe Tyler	6–1, 7–6^{(7–4)}
Loss	9–6	Sep 2022	Columbus, United States	Challenger	Hard (i)	(Germany) Constantin Frantzen	(United Kingdom) Julian Cash (United Kingdom) Henry Patten	2–6, 5–7
Loss	9–7	Mar 2023	M25 Trimbach, Switzerland	WTT	Carpet	(United Kingdom) Anton Matusevich	(Germany) Daniel Masur (Germany) Johannes Härteis	6-7^{(3–7)}, 7-6^{(7–3)}, [5-10]
Loss	9–8	May 2023	M25 Värnamo, Sweden	WTT	Clay	(United Kingdom) Mark Whitehouse	(Sweden) Simon Freund (Ukraine) Eric Vanshelboim	3–6 3–6
Win	10–8	July 2023	M25 Nottingham, United Kingdom	WTT	Grass	(United Kingdom) Ben Jones	(United Kingdom) Matthew Howse (United Kingdom) Joel Pierleoni	Walkover
Win	11–8	July 2023	M25 Roehampton, United Kingdom	WTT	Hard	(United Kingdom) George Houghton	(United Kingdom) Emile Hudd (United Kingdom) Johannus Monday	6–4, 4–6, [11–9]
Loss	11–9	Oct 2023	M25 Edgbaston, United Kingdom	WTT	Hard	(United Kingdom) David Stevenson	(United Kingdom) Jacob Fearnley (United Kingdom) Connor Thomson	6–7^{(2–7)}, 7–6^{(7–5)}, [7–10]
Loss	11–10	Oct 2023	M25 Saint-Augustin, Canada	WTT	Hard (i)	(United Kingdom) Ben Jones	(France) Max Westphal (United States) Theodore Winegar	6–4, 3–6, [9–11]
Loss	11–11	Nov 2023	Calgary, Canada	Challenger	Hard (i)	(United Kingdom) Ben Jones	(Canada) Juan Carlos Aguilar (Canada) Justin Boulais	3–6, 2–6
Win	12–11	Jan 2024	M25 Loughborough, United Kingdom	WTT	Hard (i)	(United Kingdom) George Houghton	(United Kingdom) Jay Clarke (United Kingdom) Millen Hurrion	7–5, 6–3
Loss	12–12	Mar 2024	M25 Santo Domingo, Dominican Republic	WTT	Hard	(United Kingdom) David Stevenson	(Colombia) Nicolás Mejía (Colombia) Andrés Urrea	6–7^{(2–7)}, 6–3, [7–10]
Win	13–12	Apr 2024	M25 Nottingham, United Kingdom	WTT	Hard	(United Kingdom) Daniel Little	(United Kingdom) James Davis (United Kingdom) Matthew Summers	5–7, 7–5, [10–6]
Win	14–12	May 2024	M25 Kachreti, Georgia	WTT	Hard	(United Kingdom) Hamish Stewart	(Uzbekistan) Denis Istomin; Evgeny Karlovskiy	6–4, 6–4
Win	15–12	May 2024	Kachreti, Georgia	Challenger	Hard	(United Kingdom) Ben Jones	Evgeny Karlovskiy; Evgenii Tiurnev	3–6, 6–1, [10–8]
Win	16–12	Aug 2024	Grodzisk Mazowiecki, Poland	Challenger	Hard	(United Kingdom) David Stevenson	(Israel) Daniel Cukierman (Denmark) Johannes Ingildsen	6–3, 7–6^{(7–3)}
Loss	16–13	May 2025	M25 Nottingham, United Kingdom	WTT	Hard	(United Kingdom) Ben Jones	(Canada) Justin Boulais (United States) Andres Martin	6–7^{(4–7)}, 2–6
Loss	16–14	Jun 2025	Ilkley, United Kingdom	Challenger	Grass	(United Kingdom) Ben Jones	(Ecuador) Diego Hidalgo (United States) Patrik Trhac	3–6, 7–6^{(10–8)}, [7–10]
Loss	16–15	Jun 2025	Nottingham II, United Kingdom	Challenger	Grass	(United Kingdom) Mark Whitehouse	(United Kingdom) Scott Duncan (United Kingdom) James MacKinlay	5–7, 6–4, [18–20]
Win	17–15	Jan 2026	Nottingham I, United Kingdom	Challenger	Hard (i)	(United Kingdom) David Stevenson	(Slovakia) Miloš Karol (Germany) Daniel Masur	6–2, 7–6^{(7–5)}
Loss	17–16	Jan 2026	Glasgow, United Kingdom	Challenger	Hard (i)	(United Kingdom) Ben Jones	(Germany) Christoph Negritu (Colombia) Adrià Soriano Barrera	6–2, 2–6, [4–10]
