= Henry Searle (tennis) =

British tennis player (born 2006)

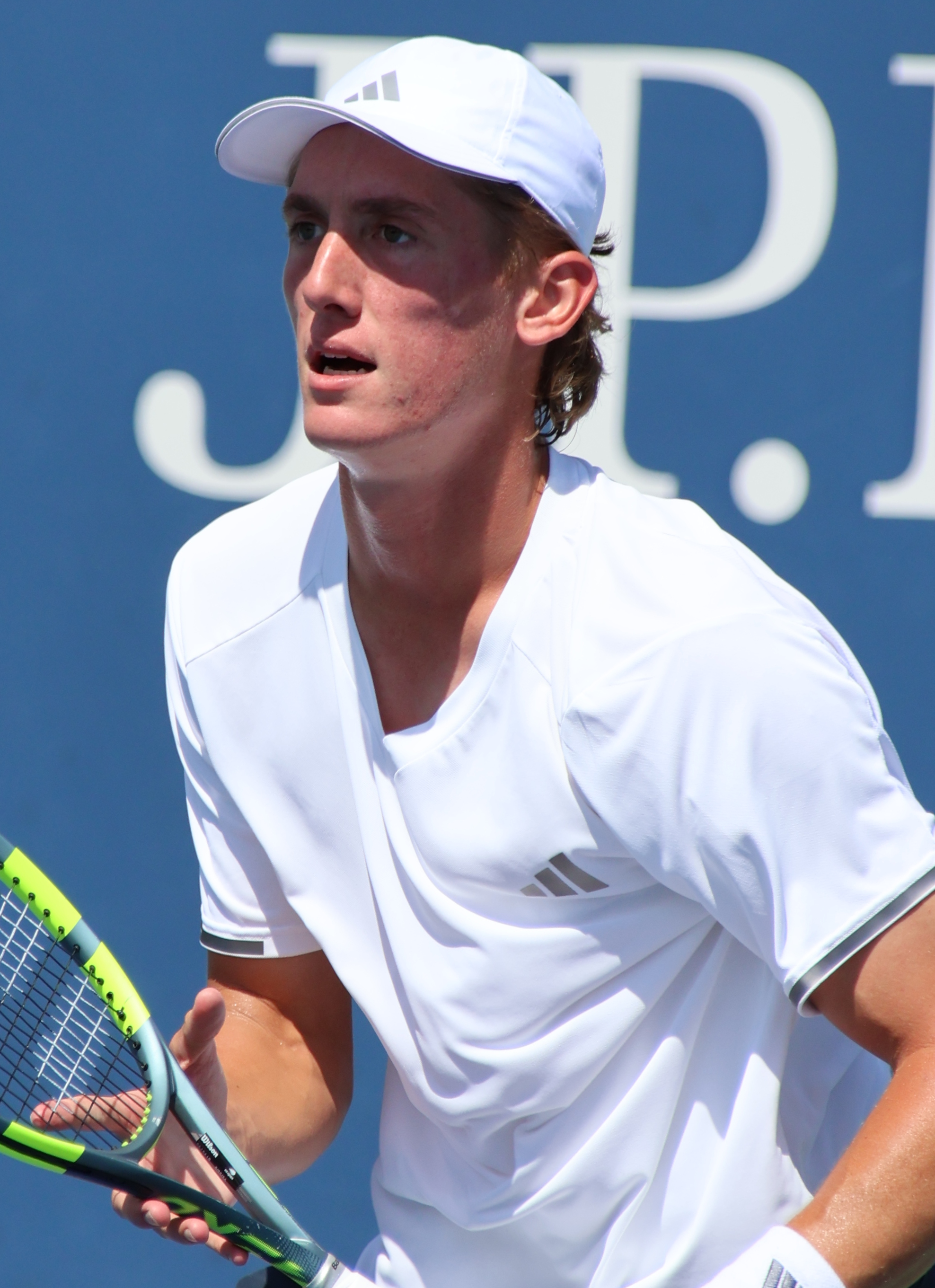
- Searle at the 2026 US Open
- Country (sports): Great Britain
- Born: 29 March 2006 (age 20) Wolverhampton, England, UK
- Height: 1.93 m (6 ft 4 in)
- Plays: Left-handed (two-handed backhand)
- Coach: Dan Evans (Jun 2026–)
- Prize money: US $326,834

Singles
- Career record: 0–3 (at ATP Tour level, Grand Slam level, and in Davis Cup)
- Career titles: 0
- Highest ranking: No. 214 (13 July 2026)
- Current ranking: No. 214 (13 July 2026)

Grand Slam singles results
- Wimbledon: 1R (2024, 2025)
- US Open: Q1 (2026)

Doubles
- Career record: 0–3 (at ATP Tour level, Grand Slam level, and in Davis Cup)
- Career titles: 0
- Highest ranking: No. 926 (26 February 2024)
- Current ranking: No. 1,374 (13 July 2026)

Grand Slam doubles results
- Wimbledon: 1R (2024, 2025, 2026)
- Last updated on: 13 July 2026.

Henry Searle (né Trump; born 29 March 2006) is a British professional tennis player. He has a career-high ATP singles ranking of No. 214 achieved on 13 July 2026 and a doubles ranking of No. 926, reached on 26 February 2024.

Searle won the boys' singles title at the 2023 Wimbledon.

== Junior career ==
In 2022, Searle won the Under 16 & Junior British National Championship.

Searle also had notable results on the Junior circuit, maintaining a 87–40 singles win-loss record. He reached the quarterfinals at the 2023 French Open boys singles before losing to eventual champion Dino Prižmić.

In July 2023, he defeated the top seed Juan Carlos Prado Ángelo in Boys' singles at the 2023 Wimbledon Championships. He followed that up with wins over Manas Dhamne, Arthur Géa and João Fonseca, without dropping a set. He defeated American junior Grand Slam winner Cooper Williams in the semifinals, again winning in straight sets. During the semifinal he was recorded as serving a first serve at 129 mph. In the final he faced Yaroslav Demin again winning in straight sets, becoming the first British junior to win the boys' title at Wimbledon since Stanley Matthews, in 1962. As a result of that successful season, he reached an ITF junior combined ranking of world No. 3 in January 2024.

== Professional career ==
=== 2024: ATP and Major debuts ===
In April, Searle defeated top seed JJ Wolf at the 2024 Tallahassee Tennis Challenger, his third victory in a Challenger level event, before losing his next match to Joel Schwaerzler.

He made his ATP debut at the 2024 Eastbourne International as a lucky loser but lost to Lorenzo Sonego. For his Grand Slam debut, Searle received a wildcard for Wimbledon in June 2024, losing in the first round to Marcos Giron.

=== 2025: First Challenger final ===
Searle reached his first ATP Challenger final in Nottingham in January 2025, losing to Viktor Durasovic in three sets.

He was awarded a wildcard for Wimbledon, where he was defeated in the first round of the singles event by American Ethan Quinn. In doubles, alongside Dan Evans, he lost in the first round to defending champions Henry Patten and Harri Heliovaara.

=== 2026: Maiden Challenger title, top 250 ===
In June, Searle won his maiden Challenger title at the Dublin Challenger, defeating fourth seed Jurij Rodionov in the final. He received a wildcard entry into the men's doubles at Wimbledon, where he partnered Dan Evans, losing to ninth seeds Hugo Nys and Édouard Roger-Vasselin in the first round in what was Evans' final match as a professional tennis player. In July, he won his second Challenger title at the Nottingham II Challenger, defeating top seed Clément Chidekh in the final. He entered the top 250 as a result.

== Coaches ==
Searle's coach is Morgan Phillips, the head coach at the Lawn Tennis Association's national academy in Loughborough. He said that the Wimbledon boy's victory, and the associated rankings increase, could "fast-track" him into senior tournaments.

== Personal life ==
Searle is from Wolverhampton. He attended St Peter's Collegiate Academy, and played tennis at the Wolverhampton Lawn Tennis & Squash Club. He is the son of cricketer Harvey Trump, and the grandson of Gerald Trump. A keen footballer, he is a fan of his local Premier League team Wolverhampton Wanderers.

He attended Loughborough Amherst School which partners with Loughborough University to support the National Tennis Academy.

== ATP Challenger Tour finals ==
=== Singles: 3 (2 titles, 1 runner-up) ===
Result	W–L	Date	Tournament	Tier	Surface	Opponent	Score
Loss	0–1	Jan 2025	Nottingham Challenger, UK	Challenger	Hard (i)	(Norway) Viktor Durasovic	6–7^{(6–8)}, 6–3, 1–6
Win	1–1	Jun 2026	Dublin Challenger, Ireland	Challenger	Grass	(Austria) Jurij Rodionov	6–4, 6–2
Win	2–1	Jul 2026	Nottingham Challenger II, UK	Challenger	Grass	(France) Clément Chidekh	6–4, 6–4

=== Doubles: 1 (runner-up) ===
Result	W–L	Date	Tournament	Tier	Surface	Partner	Opponents	Score
Loss	0–1	Feb 2024	Glasgow Challenger, UK	Challenger	Hard (i)	(United Kingdom) Kyle Edmund	(United Kingdom) Scott Duncan (United Kingdom) Marcus Willis	3–6, 2–6

== ITF World Tennis Tour finals ==
=== Singles: 5 (2 titles, 3 runner-ups) ===
Finals by surface
Hard (2–3)
Clay (–)

Result	W–L	Date	Tournament	Tier	Surface	Opponent	Score
Loss	0–1	Apr 2024	M25 Nottingham, UK	WTT	Hard	(United Kingdom) Charles Broom	3–6, 3–6
Win	1–1	Mar 2026	M15 Heraklion, Greece	WTT	Hard	(Czech Republic) Jan Kumstát	6–2, 6–2
Loss	1–2	Mar 2026	M25 Heraklion, Greece	WTT	Hard	(Belgium) Michael Geerts	4–6, 6–7^{(2–7)}
Win	2–2	Apr 2026	M15 Sanxenxo, Spain	WTT	Hard	(Portugal) Tiago Torres	6–4, 6–2
Loss	2–3	Apr 2026	M25 Nottingham, UK	WTT	Hard	(United Kingdom) Anton Matusevich	6–7^{(6–8)}, 6–7^{(9–11)}

=== Doubles: 1 (runner-up) ===
Result	W–L	Date	Tournament	Tier	Surface	Partner	Opponents	Score
Loss	0–1	Oct 2023	M15 Sharm El Sheikh, Egypt	WTT	Hard	(United Kingdom) Adam Jones	(Uzbekistan) Sergey Fomin (Georgia (country)) Saba Purtseladze	3–6, 4–6

== Junior Grand Slam finals ==
=== Singles: 1 (title) ===
Result	Year	Tournament	Surface	Opponent	Score
Win	2023	Wimbledon	Grass	Yaroslav Demin	6–4, 6–4
