= James MacKinlay =

British tennis player (born 2000)

- Country (sports): United Kingdom
- Born: 11 August 2000 (age 26) Bedford, United Kingdom
- Height: 1.88 m (6 ft 2 in)
- Plays: Right-handed (two-handed backhand)
- Prize money: US $43,607

Singles
- Career record: 0–0 (at ATP Tour level, Grand Slam level, and in Davis Cup)
- Career titles: 0
- Highest ranking: No. 1,334 (9 November 2026)
- Current ranking: No. 1,334 (9 November 2026)

Doubles
- Career record: 0–0 (at ATP Tour level, Grand Slam level, and in Davis Cup)
- Career titles: 2 ATP Challenger, 4 ITF
- Highest ranking: No. 191 (29 June 2026)
- Current ranking: No. 228 (9 November 2026)
- Last updated on: 9 November 2026.

James MacKinlay (born 11 August 2000) is a British tennis player. MacKinlay has a career high ATP doubles ranking of No. 191 achieved on 29 June 2026 and a singles ranking of No. 1,334 achieved on 9 November 2026.

MacKinlay has won two ATP Challenger doubles titles, at the 2025 Lexus Nottingham Challenger II with Scott Duncan and the 2026 ENKA Open with Arda Azkara.
