= Lexus Nottingham Challenger =

- 2026 Lexus Nottingham Challenger

ATP Challenger Tour
- Event name: Lexus Nottingham Challenger
- Location: Nottingham, United Kingdom
- Venue: Lexus Nottingham Tennis Center
- Category: ATP Challenger Tour
- Surface: Hard (indoor); Grass
- Prize money: €56,000 (2026), €91,250 (2025)

The Lexus Nottingham Challenger is a professional tennis tournament played on indoor hardcourts and outdoor grass courts, sponsored by the Japanese automotive brand Lexus. It is currently part of the ATP Challenger Tour. It was first held in Nottingham, United Kingdom in 2024. Two editions of the tournament are held since 2025, one on indoor hardcourts and one on outdoor grass courts.

== Past finals ==
=== Singles ===
Year	Champion	Runner-up	Score
2026 (2)	(United Kingdom) Henry Searle	(France) Clément Chidekh	6–4, 6–4
2026 (1)	(France) Clément Chidekh	(United Kingdom) Johannus Monday	5–7, 6–2, 7–6^{(7–5)}
2025 (2)	(United Kingdom) Jack Pinnington Jones	(United Kingdom) Kyle Edmund	6–4, 7–6^{(7–1)}
2025 (1)	(Norway) Viktor Durasovic	(United Kingdom) Henry Searle	7–6^{(8–6)}, 3–6, 6–1
2024	(France) Giovanni Mpetshi Perricard	(France) Matteo Martineau	7–6^{(7–2)}, 6–4

=== Doubles ===
Year	Champions	Runners-up	Score
2026 (2)	(United Kingdom) Tom Hands (United Kingdom) Matthew Summers	(Turkey) Arda Azkara (Turkey) S Mert Özdemir	6–4, 4–6, [12–10]
2026 (1)	(United Kingdom) Charles Broom (United Kingdom) David Stevenson	(Slovakia) Miloš Karol (Germany) Daniel Masur	6–2, 7–6^{(7–5)}
2025 (2)	(United Kingdom) Scott Duncan (United Kingdom) James MacKinlay	(United Kingdom) Charles Broom (United Kingdom) Mark Whitehouse	7–5, 4–6, [20–18]
2025 (1)	(Czech Republic) Jonáš Forejtek (Czech Republic) Michael Vrbenský	(Czech Republic) Jiří Barnat (Czech Republic) Filip Duda	7–6^{(7–5)}, 7–6^{(7–5)}
2024	(Czech Republic) Petr Nouza (Czech Republic) Patrik Rikl	(France) Antoine Escoffier (United Kingdom) Joshua Paris	6–3, 7–6^{(7–3)}
