= Lui Maxted =

English tennis player (born 2003)

- Country (sports): United Kingdom
- Born: 2 December 2003 (age 22) Worthing, England
- Height: 1.80 m (5 ft 11 in)
- Plays: Right-handed (one-handed backhand)
- College: Texas Christian University
- Prize money: US $69,499

Singles
- Career record: 0–0
- Career titles: 0
- Highest ranking: No. 360 (31 August 2026)
- Current ranking: No. 380 (19 October 2026)

Doubles
- Career record: 0-1
- Career titles: 0
- Highest ranking: No. 327 (6 April 2026)
- Current ranking: No. 476 (19 October 2026)

Grand Slam doubles results
- Wimbledon: 1R (2025)
- Last updated on: 19 October 2026.

Lui Maxted (born 2 December 2003) is a British tennis player. He has a career high singles world ranking of No. 360 achieved on 31 August 2026 and a career high doubles world ranking of No. 327 achieved on 6 April 2026.

== Early life ==
He is from Worthing, West Sussex. He won both under-14 and under-16 age category titles at the Nike Winter National Tour finals to move to the number one British age-group ranking in 2018. As a 17 year-old, he played in the boys' singles at the 2021 Wimbledon Championships. He also played at the junior French Open in 2021 and played junior Davis Cup tennis for Great Britain. He became the number two ranked junior male player in Great Britain in 2021, behind Jack Pinnington Jones.

== NCAA ==
Competing for Texas Christian University he was part of teams that won the 2022 and 2023 ITA Indoor National Championships and the NCAA Team Championship in 2024. Alongside Spanish playing partner Pedro Vives, Maxted won the men’s doubles at NCAA Tennis Championships, in November 2024. In doing so, he became only the third British male to win the title after Dominic Inglot in 2009 and Lloyd Glasspool in 2015.

== Professional career ==
Playing alongside fellow-collegiate tennis player Michael Zheng he won the men's doubles title at the M25 Southaven tournament in the United States, winning against American pairing Andres Martin and Keshav Chopra in straight sets in the final.

Alongside Scottish player Connor Thomson he was awarded a wildcard into the men's doubles at the 2025 Wimbledon Championships.
