= Alastair Gray =

British tennis player (born 1998)

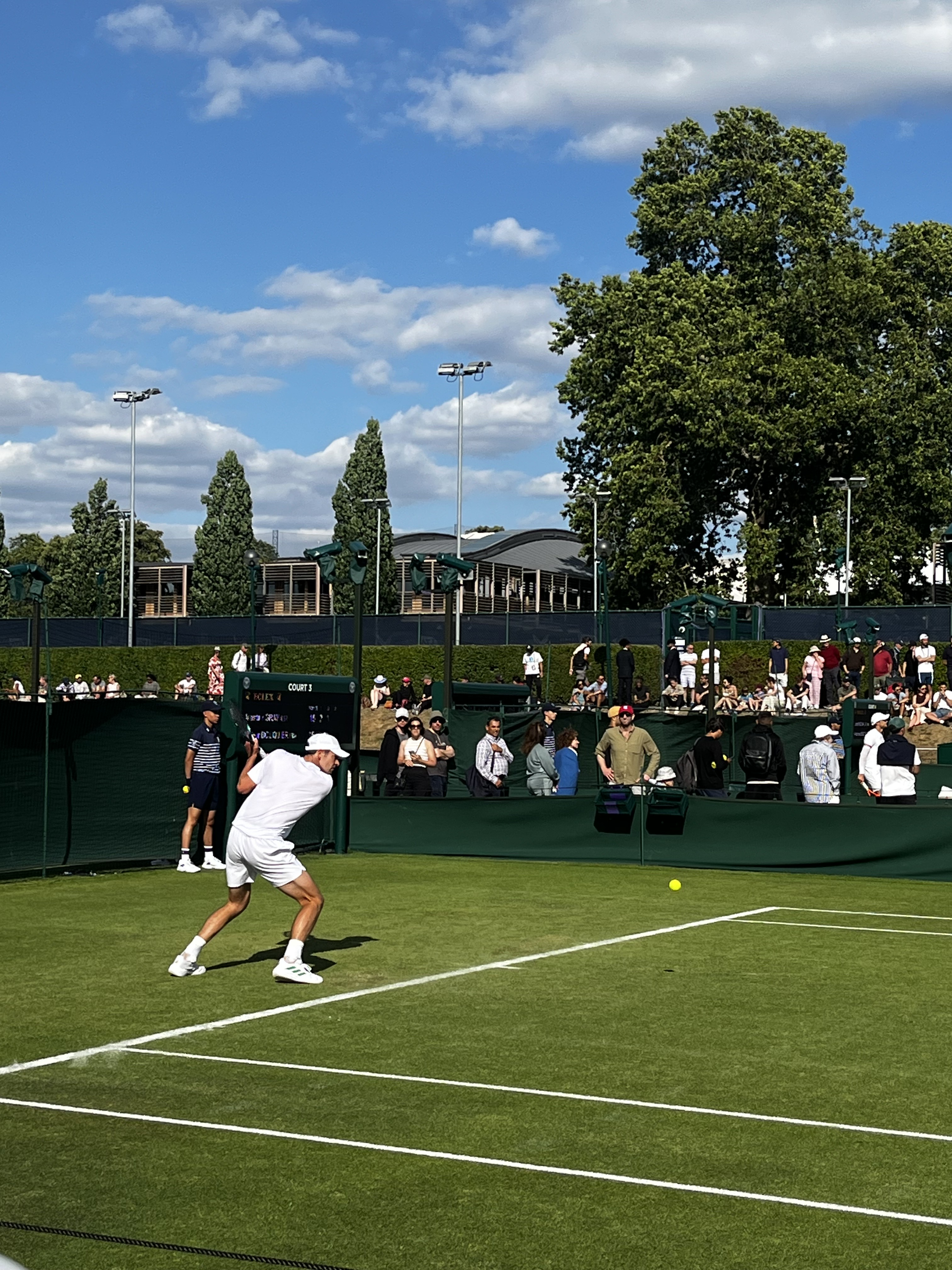
- Alistair Gray playing at the 2025 Wimbledon qualifying tournament
- Country (sports): United Kingdom
- Born: 22 June 1998 (age 28) Twickenham, United Kingdom
- Height: 1.93 m (6 ft 4 in)
- Turned pro: 2016
- Plays: Right-handed (one-handed backhand)
- College: Texas Christian University
- Coach: Juan Martin
- Prize money: US $342,958

Singles
- Career record: 1–3 (at ATP Tour level, Grand Slam level, and in Davis Cup)
- Career titles: 14 ITF
- Highest ranking: No. 237 (19 September 2022)
- Current ranking: No. 270 (9 November 2026)

Grand Slam singles results
- Wimbledon: 2R (2022)

Doubles
- Career record: 1–4 (at ATP Tour level, Grand Slam level, and in Davis Cup)
- Career titles: 4 ITF
- Highest ranking: No. 304 (20 June 2022)
- Current ranking: No. 792 (9 November 2026)

Grand Slam doubles results
- Wimbledon: 2R (2021)
- Last updated on: 9 November 2026.

Alastair Gray (born 22 June 1998) is a British tennis player who competes on the ITF Men's Circuit. He has a career high ATP singles ranking of world No. 237 achieved on 19 September 2022 and a career high ATP doubles ranking of No. 304 achieved on 20 June 2022.

Gray played college tennis at Texas Christian University.

== Career ==
Gray made his ATP main draw debut at the 2019 Hall of Fame Open after receiving a wildcard for the singles tournament. He also received a wildcard for the main draw of the 2021 Wimbledon Championships men’s doubles alongside Aidan McHugh, where he recorded his first doubles win at a Major against the Czech pair of Jiří Veselý and Roman Jebavý.

Gray made his Grand Slam tournament debut at the 2022 Wimbledon Championships as a wildcard where he won his first singles match against Tseng Chun-hsin, before losing to 11th seed Taylor Fritz in the second round.

== Early life ==
Gray attended Parkside School, Cobham, his time there overlapping with fellow British tennis player Jack Draper.

== Playing style ==
Gray plays right-handed with a one-handed backhand. He prefers hard and grass court surfaces. The standout feature of his game is a highly effective first serve, the sound of which has been compared to a gunshot.

== ITF World Tennis Tour Finals ==
=== Singles: 20 (14–6) ===
Legend ITF World Tennis Tour (14–6)	Finals by surface Hard (12–5) Grass (1–0) Carpet (1–1)

Result	W–L	Date	Tournament	Tier	Surface	Opponent	Score
Win	1–0	Sep 2021	M25 Johannesburg, South Africa	World Tennis Tour	Hard	(Australia) Jeremy Beale	7–6^{(7–4)}, 6–4
Win	2–0	Sep 2021	M25 Johannesburg, South Africa	World Tennis Tour	Hard	(Greece) Michail Pervolarakis	4–6, 6–3, 6–2
Loss	2–1	Nov 2021	M15, Heraklion, Greece	World Tennis Tour	Hard	(Italy) Francesco Maestrelli	0–6, 6–3, 5–7
Win	3–1	Feb 2022	M25 Shrewsbury, United Kingdom	World Tennis Tour	Hard (i)	(United Kingdom) Harry Wendelken	7–5, 6–1
Win	4–1	Feb 2022	M25 Glasgow, United Kingdom	World Tennis Tour	Hard (i)	(Germany) Henri Squire	6–3, 6–7^{(6–8)}, 7–6^{(7–4)}
Loss	4–2	Mar 2022	M25 Trimbach, Switzerland	World Tennis Tour	Carpet (i)	(Switzerland) Leandro Riedi	2–6, 2–6
Win	5–2	Aug 2022	M25 Nottingham, United Kingdom	World Tennis Tour	Grass	(United Kingdom) Daniel Cox	3–6, 6–4, 7–5
Loss	5–3	Nov 2022	M25 Sharm El Sheikh, Egypt	World Tennis Tour	Hard	(Poland) Kacper Żuk	4–6, 4–6
Loss	5–4	Apr 2023	M25 Trento, Italy	World Tennis Tour	Hard (i)	(Switzerland) Jérôme Kym	6–7^{(7–9)}, 2–6
Loss	5–5	Nov 2023	M15 Heraklion, Greece	World Tennis Tour	Hard	(France) Arthur Géa	6–7^{(2–7)}, 3–6
Win	6–5	Nov 2023	M15 Madrid, Spain	World Tennis Tour	Hard	(Syria) Hazem Naw	6–1, 6–7^{(5–7)}, 6–2
	6–5	Dec 2023	M15 Zahra, Kuwait	World Tennis Tour	Hard	(Belgium) Emilien Demanet	not played
Loss	6–6	Aug 2024	M25 Idanha-a-Nova, Portugal	World Tennis Tour	Hard	(Paraguay) Adolfo Daniel Vallejo	2–6, 3–6
Win	7–6	Jan 2025	M25 Indore, India	World Tennis Tour	Hard	(United States) Samir Banerjee	6–3, 1–1 ret.
Win	8–6	Jan 2025	M25 Bhopal, India	World Tennis Tour	Hard	Maxim Zhukov	6–3, 6–4
Win	9–6	Jan 2025	M25 Glasgow, Great Britain	World Tennis Tour	Hard (i)	(United Kingdom) Millen Hurrion	6–4, 6–3
Win	10–6	Aug 2025	M15 Dublin, Ireland	World Tennis Tour	Carpet (i)	(Republic of Ireland) Michael Agwi	2–6, 6–4, 7–5
Win	11–6	Nov 2025	M25 Vale do Lobo, Portugal	World Tennis Tour	Hard	(Ukraine) Georgii Kravchenko	6–3, 7–5
Win	12–6	Nov 2025	M25 Vale do Lobo, Portugal	World Tennis Tour	Hard	(Ukraine) Georgii Kravchenko	6–1, 7–5
Win	13–6	Mar 2026	M25 Ma'anshan, China	World Tennis Tour	Hard	(Chinese Taipei) Lee Kuan-yi	6–2, 6–3
Win	14–6	Apr 2026	M25 Luzhou, China	World Tennis Tour	Hard	(China) Cui Jie	6–1, 6–4

=== Doubles: 7 (5–2) ===
Legend ITF Futures/World Tennis Tour (5–2)	Finals by surface Hard (4–2) Clay (0–0) Grass (1–0)

Result	W–L	Date	Tournament	Tier	Surface	Partner	Opponents	Score
Loss	0–1	Nov 2016	Great Britain F5, Sheffield	Futures	Hard	(United Kingdom) Ewan Moore	(United Kingdom) Scott Clayton (United Kingdom) Jonny O'Mara	4–6, 4–6
Win	1–1	Aug 2019	M25 Roehampton, United Kingdom	World Tennis Tour	Hard	(United Kingdom) Ewan Moore	(United Kingdom) Scott Clayton (United Kingdom) Luke Johnson	6–3, 7–6^{(7–5)}
Win	2–1	Aug 2021	M25 Bagnères-de-Bigorre, France	World Tennis Tour	Hard	(United Kingdom) Ryan Storrie	(France) Clément Chidekh (France) Luca Sanchez	3–6, 6–4, [10–8]
Win	3–1	Sep 2021	M25 Johannesburg, South Africa	World Tennis Tour	Hard	(Israel) Daniel Cukierman	(Brazil) Mateus Alves (Brazil) Igor Marcondes	7–6^{(7–5)}, 6–3
Win	4–1	Jan 2022	M25 Bath, United Kingdom	World Tennis Tour	Hard	(United Kingdom) Charles Broom	(Netherlands) Guy den Ouden (United Kingdom) Luke Johnson	6–2, 6–2
Win	5–1	Jul 2022	M25 Nottingham, United Kingdom	World Tennis Tour	Grass	(United Kingdom) Stuart Parker	(United Kingdom) Charles Broom (United Kingdom) Luke Johnson	7–6^{(7–4)}, 4–6, [10–5]
Loss	5–2	Nov 2022	M25 Monastir, Tunisia	World Tennis Tour	Hard	(France) Kyrian Jacquet	(China) Bu Yunchaokete (Chinese Taipei) Ray Ho	2–6, 4–6
Loss	5–3	Dec 2024	M25 Indore, India	World Tennis Tour	Hard	(France) Mathys Erhard	(India) Parikshit Somani (India) Dhakshineswar Suresh	Walkover
Loss	5–4	Jul 2025	M15 Dublin, Ireland	World Tennis Tour	Carpet	(United Kingdom) Hamish Stewart	(United Kingdom) Finn Bass (United Kingdom) Ben Jones	4–6, 6–7^{(6–8)}
