= Johannus Monday =

British tennis player (born 2002)

- Monday at the 2026 Wimbledon Championships
- Country (sports): United Kingdom
- Born: 22 January 2002 (age 24) Hull, England
- Height: 1.98 m (6 ft 6 in)
- Plays: Left-handed (two-handed backhand)
- College: Tennessee
- Prize money: $383,127

Singles
- Career record: 0–1 (at ATP Tour level, Grand Slam level, and in Davis Cup)
- Career titles: 0
- Highest ranking: No. 212 (27 October 2025)
- Current ranking: No. 311 (24 August 2026)

Grand Slam singles results
- Wimbledon: 1R (2025)
- US Open: Q1 (2025)

Doubles
- Career record: 1–2 (at ATP Tour level, Grand Slam level, and in Davis Cup)
- Career titles: 0
- Highest ranking: No. 192 (28 August 2023)
- Current ranking: No. 271 (22 June 2026)

Grand Slam doubles results
- Wimbledon: 2R (2023)
- Last updated on: 22 June 2026.

Johannus Monday (born 22 January 2002) is a British tennis player. He has a career high singles ranking of No. 212, achieved on 27 October 2025. He has a career high doubles ranking of No. 192 achieved on 28 August 2023.

== Early life ==
Monday was born in Kingston upon Hull, and brought up in nearby Cottingham. He began playing tennis at the age of four years-old. He attended St Mary's College and, from 2015, boarded at Merchiston Castle School in Edinburgh.

In 2020 he began studying political science at the University of Tennessee on a tennis scholarship. Whilst competing on the college circuit he became the number one ranked NCAA player.

== Career ==
After winning the title of the men's doubles of the Nottingham Open alongside Jacob Fearnley, the pair received wildcards for the 2023 Wimbledon Championships. He was also given a wildcard into the men's qualifying singles and beat Mili Poljicak before pushing the experienced Radu Albot to three sets. In the doubles, he and Fearnley beat Andre Goransson and Ben McLachlan in the opening round before losing to Matthew Ebden and Rohan Bopanna.

He won three consecutive singles titles on the ITF tennis tour in October 2024. His haul included the singles and doubles titles at the M25 Louisville, a singles victory in Norman, Oklahoma, and a singles victory in Harlingen, Texas.

He began 2025 with another title at that level in Sunderland before adding a fifth in six months in Bakersfield, United States in March 2025, defeating American Alex Rybakov in the final in straight sets to seal the title.

In June 2025, Monday was awarded a wildcard to make his major tournament main-draw singles debut at Wimbledon, where he lost to 13th seed Tommy Paul in the first round.

In September 2025, Monday combined with Patrick Harper to win the doubles title at the Columbus Challenger, defeating George Goldhoff and Theodore Winegar in the final.

In October 2025, Monday reached his first Challenger final in singles, at the Sioux Falls Challenger. He lost to fifth seed Patrick Kypson in three sets.

== ATP Challenger and ITF Tour finals ==
=== Singles: 10 (8 titles, 2 runner-ups) ===
Legend ATP Challenger (0–2) ITF WTT (8–0)	Finals by surface Hard (8–2) Clay (–)

Result	W–L	Date	Tournament	Tier	Surface	Opponent	Score
Win	1–0	Jun 2022	M15 South Bend, US	WTT	Hard	(United States) Sekou Bangoura	6–3, 7–5
Win	2–0	Aug 2022	M25 Decatur, US	WTT	Hard	(United States) Ezekiel Clark	6–3, 6–3
Win	3–0	Jul 2024	M25 East Lansing, US	WTT	Hard	(United Kingdom) Aidan McHugh	6–2, 6–2
Win	4–0	Oct 2024	M25 Louisville, US	WTT	Hard	(United States) Tyler Zink	6–2, 6–3
Win	5–0	Oct 2024	M25 Harlingen, US	WTT	Hard	(Czech Republic) Tadeas Paroulek	6–0, 6–1
Win	6–0	Oct 2024	M25 Norman, US	WTT	Hard (i)	(Canada) Juan Carlos Aguilar	6–1, 6–3
Win	7–0	Jan 2025	M25 Sunderland, UK	WTT	Hard (i)	(United Kingdom) Ryan Peniston	6–4, 6–2
Win	8–0	Mar 2025	M25 Bakersfield, US	WTT	Hard (i)	(United States) Alex Rybakov	6–2, 6–4
Loss	0–1	Oct 2025	Sioux Falls Challenger, US	Challenger	Hard (i)	(United States) Patrick Kypson	7–6^{(7–2)}, 6–7^{(4–7)}, 5–7
Loss	0–2	Jan 2026	Nottingham Challenger, UK	Challenger	Hard (i)	(France) Clément Chidekh	7–5, 2–6, 6–7^{(5–7)}

=== Doubles: 12 (10 titles, 2 runner-ups) ===
Legend ATP Challenger (4–0) ITF WTT (6–2)	Finals by surface Hard (8–2) Grass (2–0)

Result	W–L	Date	Tournament	Tier	Surface	Partner	Opponents	Score
Win	1–0	Jun 2023	Nottingham Open, UK	Challenger	Grass	(United Kingdom) Jacob Fearnley	(United Kingdom) Liam Broady (United Kingdom) Jonny O'Mara	6–3, 6–7^{(6–8)}, [10–7]
Win	1–0	Jul 2023	M25 Roehampton, UK	WTT	Grass	(United Kingdom) Emile Hudd	(France) Arthur Bouquier (France) François Musitelli	6–4, 7–5
Loss	1–1	Jul 2023	M25 Roehampton, UK	WTT	Hard	(United Kingdom) Emile Hudd	(United Kingdom) Charles Broom (United Kingdom) George Houghton	4–6, 6–4, [9–11]
Win	2–1	Aug 2023	M25 Roehampton, UK	WTT	Hard	(United Kingdom) Emile Hudd	(United Kingdom) Millen Hurrion (United Kingdom) Daniel Little	7–5^{(10–8)}, 7–6^{(7–4)}
Win	3–1	Aug 2023	M25 Aldershot, UK	WTT	Hard	(United Kingdom) Emile Hudd	(United Kingdom) Arthur Fery (United Kingdom) Anton Matusevich	6–3, 3–6, [10–8]
Win	4–1	Oct 2023	M15 Las Vegas, US	WTT	Hard	(Ecuador) Ángel Díaz Jalil	(United States) William Grant (Ecuador) Andrés Andrade	6–4, 6–4
Loss	4–2	Oct 2023	M25 Columbus, US	WTT	Hard	(Japan) Shunsuke Mitsui	(United States) Robert Cash (United States) Bryce Nakashima	5–7, 6–7^{(10–12)}
Win	5–2	Jul 2024	M25 Dallas, US	WTT	Hard	(Japan) Shunsuke Mitsui	(United States) Alexander Kotzen (United States) Tristan McCormick	6–4, 6–4
Win	6–2	Oct 2024	M25 Louisville, US	WTT	Hard	(United States) J.J. Mercer	(Antigua and Barbuda) Jody Maginley (United States) Evan Zhu	7–5, 6–4
Win	2–0	Nov 2024	Knoxville Challenger, US	Challenger	Hard (i)	(Australia) Patrick Harper	(United States) Micah Braswell (United States) Eliot Spizzirri	6–2, 6–2
Win	3–0	Sep 2025	Columbus Challenger, US	Challenger	Hard (i)	(Australia) Patrick Harper	(United States) George Goldhoff (United States) Theodore Winegar	6–4, 6–3
Win	4–0	Oct 2025	Lincoln Challenger, US	Challenger	Hard (i)	(Australia) Patrick Harper	(India) Aryan Shah (India) Dhakshineswar Suresh	6–4, 7–5
