= 2025 Copa Cap Cana – Singles =

Singles
- 2025 Copa Cap Cana

Final
- Champion: (United States) Aleksandar Kovacevic
- Runner-up: (Bosnia and Herzegovina) Damir Džumhur
- Score: 6–2, 6–3

Events
Singles	Doubles
Copa Cap Cana	· 2026 →

This was the first edition of the tournament.

Aleksandar Kovacevic won the title after defeating Damir Džumhur 6–2, 6–3 in the final.

== Seeds ==
The top four seeds received a bye into the second round.

1. (France) Alexandre Müller (semifinals)
2. (Argentina) Tomás Martín Etcheverry (quarterfinals)
3. (Serbia) Miomir Kecmanović (quarterfinals)
4. (Belgium) David Goffin (second round)
5. (Czech Republic) Jakub Menšík (semifinals)
6. (France) Benjamin Bonzi (second round)
7. (Italy) Mattia Bellucci (first round)
8. (United Kingdom) Cameron Norrie (first round)

== Draw ==
=== Key ===
- Q = Qualifier
- WC = Wild card
- LL = Lucky loser
- Alt = Alternate
- SE = Special exempt
- PR = Protected ranking
- ITF = ITF entry
- JE = Junior exempt
- w/o = Walkover
- r = Retired
- d = Defaulted
- SR = Special ranking

=== Finals ===
Semifinals
1	(France) Alexandre Müller	4	6	6^{5}
(United States) Aleksandar Kovacevic	6	2	7^{7}
(Bosnia and Herzegovina) Damir Džumhur	5	6	6
5	(Czech Republic) Jakub Menšík	7	4	4

Final
(United States) Aleksandar Kovacevic	6	6
(Bosnia and Herzegovina) Damir Džumhur	2	3

=== Top half ===
First round
(Finland) O Virtanen	6^{5}	0
Q	(Australia) J McCabe	7^{7}	6
Alt	(Australia) T Schoolkate	6	3	2
(Italy) F Fognini	1	6	6
Alt	(France) C Lestienne	6	7
8	(United Kingdom) C Norrie	4	5
(Serbia) D Lajović	2	7^{7}	2
(Germany) D Altmaier	6	6^{4}	6
Alt	(Hong Kong) C Wong	6	6^{4}	6
Alt	(United Kingdom) B Harris	3	7^{7}	4
(United States) A Kovacevic	6	6
7	(Italy) M Bellucci	4	4

Second round
1	(France) A Müller	6	6
Q	(Australia) J McCabe	0	2
(Italy) F Fognini	4	3
Alt	(France) C Lestienne	6	6
4	(Belgium) D Goffin	2	7^{14}	3
(Germany) D Altmaier	6	6^{12}	6
Alt	(Hong Kong) C Wong	2	6^{6}
(United States) A Kovacevic	6	7^{8}

Quarterfinals
1	(France) A Müller	7^{8}	6
Alt	(France) C Lestienne	6^{6}	4
(Germany) D Altmaier	6	4	3
(United States) A Kovacevic	4	6	6

Semifinals
1	(France) A Müller	4	6	6^{5}
(United States) A Kovacevic	6	2	7^{7}

=== Bottom half ===
First round
6	(France) B Bonzi	2	6	6
WC	(Mexico) R Pacheco Méndez	6	2	2
(United States) T Boyer	6	4	2
(Bosnia and Herzegovina) D Džumhur	3	6	6
WC	(Dominican Republic) R Cid Subervi	7	6
Alt	(Japan) S Shimabukuro	5	3
5	(Czech Republic) J Menšík	6	6
Alt	(Chile) C Garín	3	4
Q	(Japan) R Sakamoto	6	6
Q	(United States) G Nanda	3	4
(Brazil) T Seyboth Wild	6	3	2
Q	(Colombia) N Mejía	4	6	6

Second round
6	(France) B Bonzi	0	2
(Bosnia and Herzegovina) D Džumhur	6	6
WC	(Dominican Republic) R Cid Subervi	0	3
3/WC	(Serbia) M Kecmanović	6	6
5	(Czech Republic) J Menšík	6	6
Q	(Japan) R Sakamoto	4	2
Q	(Colombia) N Mejía	2	4
2	(Argentina) TM Etcheverry	6	6

Quarterfinals
(Bosnia and Herzegovina) D Džumhur	7^{7}	7^{7}
3/WC	(Serbia) M Kecmanović	6^{3}	6^{5}
5	(Czech Republic) J Menšík	6	6^{7}	6
2	(Argentina) TM Etcheverry	3	7^{9}	3

Semifinals
(Bosnia and Herzegovina) D Džumhur	5	6	6
5	(Czech Republic) J Menšík	7	4	4
