= 2024 Olbia Challenger – Singles =

Singles
- 2024 Olbia Challenger

Final
- Champion: (Spain) Martín Landaluce
- Runner-up: (Italy) Mattia Bellucci
- Score: 6–4, 6–4

Events
| Singles | Doubles |
| ← 2023 · | Olbia Challenger | · 2025 → |

Kyrian Jacquet was the defending champion but chose not to defend his title.

Martín Landaluce won the title after defeating Mattia Bellucci 6–4, 6–4 in the final.

== Seeds ==
1. (Italy) Luca Nardi (first round, retired)
2. (Italy) Mattia Bellucci (final)
3. (France) Harold Mayot (first round)
4. (Croatia) Duje Ajduković (second round)
5. (Argentina) Marco Trungelliti (second round)
6. (France) Constant Lestienne (quarterfinals)
7. (Italy) Matteo Gigante (semifinals)
8. (United Kingdom) Jan Choinski (first round)

== Draw ==
=== Key ===
- Q = Qualifier
- WC = Wild card
- LL = Lucky loser
- Alt = Alternate
- ITF = ITF entry
- PR = Protected ranking
- SR = Special ranking
- SE = Special exempt
- JE = Junior exempt
- JR = Junior Accelerator Programme entrant
- CO = College Accelerator Programme entrant
- NG = Next Gen Accelerator Program entrant
- w/o = Walkover
- r = Retired
- d = Defaulted

=== Finals ===
Semifinals
7 | (Italy) Matteo Gigante | 1 | 3
(Spain) Martín Landaluce | 6 | 6
(Czech Republic) Dalibor Svrčina | 6^{5} | 6 | 3
2/WC | (Italy) Mattia Bellucci | 7^{7} | 3 | 6

Final
(Spain) Martín Landaluce | 6 | 6
2/WC | (Italy) Mattia Bellucci | 4 | 4

=== Top half ===
First round
1/WC | (Italy) L Nardi | 5 | 1^{r}
(Spain) J Barranco Cosano | 7 | 4
Q | (Ukraine) O Krutykh | 7 | 3 | 5
(United States) Em Nava | 5 | 6 | 7
Q | (Canada) S Diez | 6 | 3 | 0
Q | (France) L Lokoli | 4 | 6 | 6
(Germany) R Molleker | 2 | 2
7 | (Italy) M Gigante | 6 | 6
3 | (France) H Mayot | 1 | 2
(Spain) M Landaluce | 6 | 6
(Italy) S Travaglia | 7 | 6
Alt | (Italy) J Berrettini | 5 | 0
(Italy) E Dalla Valle | 4 | 3
Q | (Spain) D Mérida | 6 | 6
(Italy) A Vavassori | 6 | 6
8 | (United Kingdom) J Choinski | 4 | 0

Second round
(Spain) J Barranco Cosano | 6 | 6
(United States) Em Nava | 4 | 3
Q | (France) L Lokoli | 1 | 1
7 | (Italy) M Gigante | 6 | 6
(Spain) M Landaluce | 6 | 7^{8}
(Italy) S Travaglia | 4 | 6^{6}
Q | (Spain) D Mérida | 4 | 6^{1}
(Italy) A Vavassori | 6 | 7^{7}

Quarterfinals
(Spain) J Barranco Cosano | 6^{7} | 7 | 3
7 | (Italy) M Gigante | 7^{9} | 5 | 6
(Spain) M Landaluce | 2 | 6 | 6
(Italy) A Vavassori | 6 | 1 | 2

Semifinals
7 | (Italy) M Gigante | 1 | 3
(Spain) M Landaluce | 6 | 6

=== Bottom half ===
First round
5 | (Argentina) M Trungelliti | 3 | 6 | 7
(Spain) C Taberner | 6 | 3 | 5
(Italy) Samuel Vincent Ruggeri | 6 | 6
(France) B Paire | 3 | 2
(Czech Republic) D Svrčina | 6 | 6
(Italy) F Arnaboldi | 0 | 0
(Croatia) M Poljičak | 2^{r}
4 | (Croatia) D Ajduković | 3
6 | (France) C Lestienne | 6 | 6
Q | (Uzbekistan) S Fomin | 0 | 3
(Switzerland) R Bertola | 6 | 6^{3} | 7
WC | (Italy) F Cinà | 4 | 7^{7} | 5
Q | (Czech Republic) H Bartoň | 6 | 3 | 7
Alt | (Austria) D Novak | 1 | 6 | 5
(France) M Janvier | 3 | 4
2/WC | (Italy) M Bellucci | 6 | 6

Second round
5 | (Argentina) M Trungelliti | 4 | 6^{4}
(Italy) S Vincent Ruggeri | 6 | 7^{7}
(Czech Republic) D Svrčina | 6 | 7
4 | (Croatia) D Ajduković | 1 | 5
6 | (France) C Lestienne | 6 | 6
(Switzerland) R Bertola | 2 | 2
Q | (Czech Republic) H Bartoň | 3 | 2
2/WC | (Italy) M Bellucci | 6 | 6

Quarterfinals
(Italy) S Vincent Ruggeri | 6 | 0 | 4
(Czech Republic) D Svrčina | 3 | 6 | 6
6 | (France) C Lestienne | 6^{2} | 7^{7} | 5
2/WC | (Italy) M Bellucci | 7^{7} | 6^{5} | 7

Semifinals
(Czech Republic) D Svrčina | 6^{5} | 6 | 3
2/WC | (Italy) M Bellucci | 7^{7} | 3 | 6
