= 2023 Olbia Challenger – Singles =

Singles
- 2023 Olbia Challenger

Final
- Champion: (France) Kyrian Jacquet
- Runner-up: (Italy) Flavio Cobolli
- Score: 6–3, 6–4

Events
| Singles | Doubles |
| Olbia Challenger | · 2024 → |

This was the first edition of the tournament.

Kyrian Jacquet won the title after defeating Flavio Cobolli 6–3, 6–4 in the final.

== Seeds ==
1. (France) Alexandre Müller (second round)
2. (France) Constant Lestienne (quarterfinals)
3. (Argentina) Thiago Agustín Tirante (first round)
4. (Slovakia) Alex Molčan (semifinals)
5. (Spain) Pedro Martínez (second round)
6. (France) Corentin Moutet (first round)
7. (Italy) Flavio Cobolli (final)
8. (France) Benoît Paire (first round)

== Draw ==
=== Key ===
- Q = Qualifier
- WC = Wild card
- LL = Lucky loser
- Alt = Alternate
- SE = Special exempt
- PR = Protected ranking
- ITF = ITF entry
- JE = Junior exempt
- w/o = Walkover
- r = Retired
- d = Defaulted
- SR = Special ranking

=== Finals ===
Semifinals
Q | (France) Kyrian Jacquet | 6 | 4 | 7^{7}
SE | (Belgium) Joris De Loore | 4 | 6 | 6^{5}
4 | (Slovakia) Alex Molčan | 4 | 1
7 | (Italy) Flavio Cobolli | 6 | 6

Final
Q | (France) Kyrian Jacquet | 6 | 6
7 | (Italy) Flavio Cobolli | 3 | 4

=== Top half ===
First round
1 | (France) A Müller | 3 | 7^{7} | 7^{7}
(Italy) F Fognini | 6 | 6^{5} | 6^{3}
SE | (France) U Blanchet | 7 | 6
(Czech Republic) Z Kolář | 5 | 1
Q | (Ukraine) V Orlov | 7 | 3 | 4
Q | (France) K Jacquet | 5 | 6 | 6
WC | (Italy) Lorenzo Carboni | 3 | 3
5 | (Spain) P Martínez | 6 | 6
3 | (Argentina) TA Tirante | 3 | 2
SE | (Belgium) J De Loore | 6 | 6
WC | (South Africa) L Harris | 7^{7} | 6
Alt | (Italy) A Giannessi | 6^{3} | 0
Q | (Italy) F Forti | 3 | 6 | 6
(United Kingdom) R Peniston | 6 | 4 | 4
Q | (France) M Bourgue | 7^{7} | 1 | 6
6 | (France) C Moutet | 6^{4} | 6 | 1

Second round
1 | (France) A Müller | 6^{8} | 4
SE | (France) U Blanchet | 7^{10} | 6
Q | (France) K Jacquet | 6 | 7^{7}
5 | (Spain) P Martínez | 3 | 6^{2}
SE | (Belgium) J De Loore | 6 | 7^{8}
WC | (South Africa) L Harris | 3 | 6^{6}
Q | (Italy) F Forti | 6 | 6
Q | (France) M Bourgue | 4 | 1

Quarterfinals
SE | (France) U Blanchet | 0 | 6 | 2
Q | (France) K Jacquet | 6 | 4 | 6
SE | (Belgium) J De Loore | 6 | 6
Q | (Italy) F Forti | 4 | 4

Semifinals
Q | (France) K Jacquet | 6 | 4 | 7^{7}
SE | (Belgium) J De Loore | 4 | 6 | 6^{5}

=== Bottom half ===
First round
8 | (France) B Paire | 4 | 6 | 2
(Italy) M Bellucci | 6 | 3 | 6
(Italy) R Brancaccio | 7 | 5 | 6
Q | (Switzerland) R Bertola | 5 | 7 | 3
WC | (Italy) F Maestrelli | 3 | 4
Q | (Romania) M Copil | 6 | 6
(Bulgaria) D Kuzmanov | 6^{5} | 0^{r}
4 | (Slovakia) A Molčan | 7^{7} | 0
7 | (Italy) F Cobolli | 6 | 6^{7} | 6
(United States) Em Nava | 2 | 7^{9} | 3
(Italy) F Gaio | 6 | 6
(France) H Mayot | 2 | 0
(Italy) M Gigante | 2 | 2
(France) A Cazaux | 6 | 6
(Spain) D Rincón | 3 | 4
2 | (France) C Lestienne | 6 | 6

Second round
(Italy) M Bellucci | 6 | 6
(Italy) R Brancaccio | 4 | 4
Q | (Romania) M Copil | 2 | 2
4 | (Slovakia) A Molčan | 6 | 6
7 | (Italy) F Cobolli | 6 | 6
(Italy) F Gaio | 2 | 4
(France) A Cazaux | 2 | 4
2 | (France) C Lestienne | 6 | 6

Quarterfinals
(Italy) M Bellucci | 3 | 2
4 | (Slovakia) A Molčan | 6 | 6
7 | (Italy) F Cobolli | 7 | 7^{7}
2 | (France) C Lestienne | 5 | 6^{4}

Semifinals
4 | (Slovakia) A Molčan | 4 | 1
7 | (Italy) F Cobolli | 6 | 6
