= 2025 Olbia Challenger – Doubles =

Doubles
- 2025 Olbia Challenger

Final
- Champions: (France) Arthur Reymond (France) Luca Sanchez
- Runners-up: (Romania) Victor Vlad Cornea (Spain) Bruno Pujol Navarro
- Score: 6–4, 6–1

Events
Singles	Doubles
← 2024 ·	Olbia Challenger	· 2026 →

Oleksii Krutykh and Vitaliy Sachko were the defending champions but chose not to defend their title.

Arthur Reymond and Luca Sanchez won the title after defeating Victor Vlad Cornea and Bruno Pujol Navarro 6–4, 6–1 in the final.

== Seeds ==
1. (Canada) Cleeve Harper / (United Kingdom) David Stevenson (quarterfinals)
2. (India) Anirudh Chandrasekar / (United States) Reese Stalder (quarterfinals)
3. (United States) George Goldhoff / (United Kingdom) Marcus Willis (quarterfinals)
4. (Spain) Íñigo Cervantes / (Israel) Daniel Cukierman (quarterfinals)

== Draw ==
=== Key ===
- Q = Qualifier
- WC = Wild card
- LL = Lucky loser
- Alt = Alternate
- ITF = ITF entry
- PR = Protected ranking
- SR = Special ranking
- SE = Special exempt
- JE = Junior exempt
- JR = Junior Accelerator Programme entrant
- CO = College Accelerator Programme entrant
- NG = Next Gen Accelerator Program entrant
- w/o = Walkover
- r = Retired
- d = Defaulted

=== Draw ===
First round
1	(Canada) C Harper (United Kingdom) D Stevenson	6	6
WC	(Italy) Andrea Mendola (Italy) Davide Vargiu	3	2
(Bulgaria) A Donski (Ukraine) D Molchanov	6	7^{7}
(United States) T Hilderbrand (United States) T Winegar	4	6^{4}
3	(United States) G Goldhoff (United Kingdom) M Willis	7^{7}	6
(Finland) P Niklas-Salminen (Czech Republic) M Vrbenský	6^{4}	2
(France) A Reymond (France) L Sanchez	6	7^{8}
(Spain) S Martos Gornés (Spain) D Vega Hernández	2	6^{6}
WC	(Italy) Pierluigi Basile (Italy) CA Caniato	3	4
(Poland) S Kielan (Poland) F Pieczonka	6	6
(Denmark) J Ingildsen (Romania) A Jecan	7^{7}	5	[6]
4	(Spain) Í Cervantes (Israel) D Cukierman	6^{4}	7	[10]
(Peru) A Merino (Germany) C Negritu	2	4
(Romania) V Cornea (Spain) B Pujol Navarro	6	6
I Liutarevich (Italy) G Ricca	7^{7}	6^{3}	[9]
2	(India) A Chandrasekar (United States) R Stalder	6^{5}	7^{7}	[11]

Quarterfinals
1	(Canada) C Harper (United Kingdom) D Stevenson	6^{4}	3
(Bulgaria) A Donski (Ukraine) D Molchanov	7^{7}	6
3	(United States) G Goldhoff (United Kingdom) M Willis	6^{6}	4
(France) A Reymond (France) L Sanchez	7^{8}	6
(Poland) S Kielan (Poland) F Pieczonka	6	5	[10]
4	(Spain) Í Cervantes (Israel) D Cukierman	3	7	[7]
(Romania) V Cornea (Spain) B Pujol Navarro	7	6
2	(India) A Chandrasekar (United States) R Stalder	5	2

Semifinals
(Bulgaria) A Donski (Ukraine) D Molchanov	3	7^{7}	[7]
(France) A Reymond (France) L Sanchez	6	6^{2}	[10]
(Poland) S Kielan (Poland) F Pieczonka	3	4
(Romania) V Cornea (Spain) B Pujol Navarro	6	6

Final
(France) A Reymond (France) L Sanchez	6	6
(Romania) V Cornea (Spain) B Pujol Navarro	4	1
