= 2024 Olbia Challenger – Doubles =

Doubles
- 2024 Olbia Challenger

Final
- Champions: (Ukraine) Oleksii Krutykh (Ukraine) Vitaliy Sachko
- Runners-up: (Spain) Íñigo Cervantes (Austria) David Pichler
- Score: 4–6, 6–1, [10–5]

Events
Singles	Doubles
← 2023 ·	Olbia Challenger	· 2025 →

Rithvik Choudary Bollipalli and Arjun Kadhe were the defending champions but chose not to defend their title.

Oleksii Krutykh and Vitaliy Sachko won the title after defeating Íñigo Cervantes and David Pichler 4–6, 6–1, [10–5] in the final.

== Seeds ==
1. (United Kingdom) David Stevenson / (United Kingdom) Marcus Willis (semifinals)
2. (United States) George Goldhoff / (Romania) Alexandru Jecan (first round)
3. (Spain) Sergio Martos Gornés / (Poland) Szymon Walków (quarterfinals)
4. (Israel) Daniel Cukierman / (Denmark) Johannes Ingildsen (quarterfinals)

== Draw ==
=== Key ===
- Q = Qualifier
- WC = Wild card
- LL = Lucky loser
- Alt = Alternate
- ITF = ITF entry
- PR = Protected ranking
- SR = Special ranking
- SE = Special exempt
- JE = Junior exempt
- JR = Junior Accelerator Programme entrant
- CO = College Accelerator Programme entrant
- NG = Next Gen Accelerator Program entrant
- w/o = Walkover
- r = Retired
- d = Defaulted

=== Draw ===
First round
1	(United Kingdom) D Stevenson (United Kingdom) M Willis	w/o
(Italy) Andrea Picchione (Italy) S Travaglia
(Spain) J Barranco Cosano (Spain) B Pujol Navarro	4	0
(Slovakia) M Karol; I Liutarevich	6	6
3	(Spain) S Martos Gornés (Poland) S Walków	6	6
WC	(Uzbekistan) S Fomin (Italy) Federico Salomone	4	4
(Ukraine) O Krutykh (Ukraine) V Sachko	6	6
(Italy) M Gigante (Italy) G Ricca	4	3
WC	(Italy) A Vavassori (Italy) Matteo Vavassori	7	7^{11}
(Ukraine) V Orlov (Italy) Augusto Virgili	5	6^{9}
(Czech Republic) Z Kolář (Spain) D Vega Hernández	1	2
4	(Israel) D Cukierman (Denmark) J Ingildsen	6	6
(United States) V Kirkov (United States) Em Nava	6	6
(Spain) C Sánchez Jover (Spain) C Taberner	0	3
(Spain) Í Cervantes (Austria) D Pichler	6	6
2	(United States) G Goldhoff (Romania) A Jecan	1	2

Quarterfinals
1	(United Kingdom) D Stevenson (United Kingdom) M Willis	7^{7}	6
(Slovakia) M Karol; I Liutarevich	6^{5}	4
3	(Spain) S Martos Gornés (Poland) S Walków	4	3
(Ukraine) O Krutykh (Ukraine) V Sachko	6	6
WC	(Italy) A Vavassori (Italy) M Vavassori	6	6
4	(Israel) D Cukierman (Denmark) J Ingildsen	3	4
(United States) V Kirkov (United States) Em Nava	2	5
(Spain) Í Cervantes (Austria) D Pichler	6	7

Semifinals
1	(United Kingdom) D Stevenson (United Kingdom) M Willis	4	4
(Ukraine) O Krutykh (Ukraine) V Sachko	6	6
WC	(Italy) A Vavassori (Italy) M Vavassori	6^{5}	7^{10}	[9]
(Spain) Í Cervantes (Austria) D Pichler	7^{7}	6^{8}	[11]

Final
(Ukraine) O Krutykh (Ukraine) V Sachko	4	6	[10]
(Spain) Í Cervantes (Austria) D Pichler	6	1	[5]
