= 2022 Vilnius Open – Singles =

Singles
- 2022 Vilnius Open

Final
- Champion: (Italy) Mattia Bellucci
- Runner-up: (Turkey) Cem İlkel
- Score: 1–6, 6–3, 7–5

Events
Singles	Doubles
- Vilnius Open

This was the first edition of the tournament.

Mattia Bellucci won the title after defeating Cem İlkel 1–6, 6–3, 7–5 in the final.

== Seeds ==
1. (Czech Republic) Tomáš Macháč (first round)
2. (Lithuania) Ričardas Berankis (second round)
3. (Italy) Matteo Arnaldi (first round)
4. (Italy) Gianluca Mager (second round)
5. (Slovakia) Lukáš Klein (quarterfinals)
6. (Bosnia and Herzegovina) Nerman Fatić (second round)
7. (France) Laurent Lokoli (quarterfinals)
8. (France) Antoine Escoffier (quarterfinals)

== Draw ==
Key

- Q = Qualifier
- WC = Wild card
- LL = Lucky loser
- Alt = Alternate
- ITF = ITF entry
- PR = Protected ranking
- SR = Special ranking
- SE = Special exempt
- JE = Junior exempt
- JR = Junior Accelerator Programme entrant
- CO = College Accelerator Programme entrant
- NG = Next Gen Accelerator Program entrant
- w/o = Walkover
- r = Retired
- d = Defaulted

=== Finals ===
Semifinals
Alt	(Norway) Viktor Durasovic	4	4
(Italy) Mattia Bellucci	6	6
Q	(Turkey) Cem İlkel	7^{7}	6
(France) Dan Added	6^{3}	4

Final
(Italy) Mattia Bellucci	1	6	7
Q	(Turkey) Cem İlkel	6	3	5

=== Top half ===
First round
1	(Czech Republic) T Macháč	3	6^{5}
Alt	(Norway) V Durasovic	6	7^{7}
(Bosnia and Herzegovina) M Bašić	5	2
(Ukraine) I Marchenko	7	6
(Switzerland) J Nikles	6	6^{5}	1
WC	(Lithuania) E Butvilas	3	7^{7}	6
WC	(Lithuania) V Gaubas	1	3
8	(France) A Escoffier	6	6
4	(Italy) G Mager	6^{5}	6	6
(France) M Janvier	7^{7}	3	4
(Czech Republic) Z Kolář	6^{6}	6	7
Q	(Czech Republic) D Poljak	7^{8}	2	5
(Italy) M Bellucci	6	7^{7}
Q	(France) Jules Marie	4	6^{0}
(Brazil) G Décamps	4	5
6	(Bosnia and Herzegovina) N Fatić	6	7

Second round
Alt	(Norway) V Durasovic	5	7^{7}	6
(Ukraine) I Marchenko	7	6^{4}	1
WC	(Lithuania) E Butvilas	0	6^{6}
8	(France) A Escoffier	6	7^{8}
4	(Italy) G Mager	6^{8}	4
(Czech Republic) Z Kolář	7^{10}	6
(Italy) M Bellucci	7^{7}	6
6	(Bosnia and Herzegovina) N Fatić	6^{5}	3

Quarterfinals
Alt	(Norway) V Durasovic	6	6
8	(France) A Escoffier	1	1
(Czech Republic) Z Kolář	1	3
(Italy) M Bellucci	6	6

Semifinals
Alt	(Norway) V Durasovic	4	4
(Italy) M Bellucci	6	6

=== Bottom half ===
First round
7	(France) L Lokoli	6	6
(India) R Ramanathan	1	4
LL	(France) T Atmane	6^{6}	1
Q	(Estonia) M Lajal	7^{8}	6
(Hungary) M Valkusz	6	6
(Latvia) E Gulbis	2	3
Q	(Turkey) C İlkel	6	6
3/SE	(Italy) M Arnaldi	3	2
5	(Slovakia) L Klein	6	3	7^{7}
(United Kingdom) A Gray	3	6	6^{3}
(Croatia) N Serdarušić	3	6^{3}
(Italy) S Travaglia	6	7^{7}
(France) D Added	6	6
Q	(Germany) M Rosenkranz	4	4
WC	(Lithuania) A Sabaliauskas	4	2
2	(Lithuania) R Berankis	6	6

Second round
7	(France) L Lokoli	1	6	6
Q	(Estonia) M Lajal	6	3	0
(Hungary) M Valkusz	6^{1}	7^{7}	1
Q	(Turkey) C İlkel	7^{7}	6^{2}	6
5	(Slovakia) L Klein	6	7
(Italy) S Travaglia	0	5
(France) D Added	7	7^{7}
2	(Lithuania) R Berankis	5	6^{5}

Quarterfinals
7	(France) L Lokoli	5	3
Q	(Turkey) C İlkel	7	6
5	(Slovakia) L Klein	5	3
(France) D Added	7	6

Semifinals
Q	(Turkey) C İlkel	7^{7}	6
(France) D Added	6^{3}	4
