= 2026 Copa Cap Cana – Singles =

Singles
- 2026 Copa Cap Cana

Final
- Champion: (Argentina) Mariano Navone
- Runner-up: (Italy) Mattia Bellucci
- Score: 7–5, 6–4

Events
Singles	Doubles
- Copa Cap Cana

Mariano Navone won the title after defeating Mattia Bellucci 7–5, 6–4 in the final.

Aleksandar Kovacevic was the defending champion but was unable to defend his title as he was still competing in Indian Wells.

== Seeds ==
The top four seeds received a bye into the second round.

1. (Serbia) Miomir Kecmanović (quarterfinals)
2. (France) Valentin Royer (quarterfinals)
3. (Bosnia and Herzegovina) Damir Džumhur (second round)
4. (Poland) Hubert Hurkacz (second round)
5. (Belgium) Raphaël Collignon (quarterfinals)
6. (Argentina) Mariano Navone (champion)
7. (Chile) Cristian Garín (first round)
8. (Australia) Adam Walton (semifinals)

== Draw ==
Key

- Q = Qualifier
- WC = Wild card
- LL = Lucky loser
- Alt = Alternate
- ITF = ITF entry
- PR = Protected ranking
- SR = Special ranking
- SE = Special exempt
- JE = Junior exempt
- JR = Junior Accelerator Programme entrant
- CO = College Accelerator Programme entrant
- NG = Next Gen Accelerator Program entrant
- w/o = Walkover
- r = Retired
- d = Defaulted

=== Finals ===
Semifinals
8	(Australia) Adam Walton	3	5
(Italy) Mattia Bellucci	6	7
(Belgium) Alexander Blockx	6	3	6^{3}
6	(Argentina) Mariano Navone	3	6	7^{7}

Final
(Italy) Mattia Bellucci	5	4
6	(Argentina) Mariano Navone	7	6

=== Top half ===
First round
Alt	(United States) M McDonald	3	6	7
Q	(Spain) M Landaluce	6	2	5
(Chinese Taipei) C-h Tseng	4	4
Q	(Ecuador) A Andrade	6	6
WC	(Chile) N Jarry	6^{5}	1
8	(Australia) A Walton	7^{7}	6
(Italy) F Maestrelli	1	1
(Italy) M Bellucci	6	6
Q	(France) L Van Assche	6	6
(Australia) T Schoolkate	3	3
(Chile) T Barrios Vera	6^{4}	3
5	(Belgium) R Collignon	7^{7}	6

Second round
1	(Serbia) M Kecmanović	6	7^{7}
Alt	(United States) M McDonald	4	6^{4}
Q	(Ecuador) A Andrade	4	2
8	(Australia) A Walton	6	6
4	(Poland) H Hurkacz	2	4
(Italy) M Bellucci	6	6
Q	(France) L Van Assche	5	4
5	(Belgium) R Collignon	7	6

Quarterfinals
1	(Serbia) M Kecmanović	6	5	2
8	(Australia) A Walton	2	7	6
(Italy) M Bellucci	6	6
5	(Belgium) R Collignon	4	2

Semifinals
8	(Australia) A Walton	3	5
(Italy) M Bellucci	6	7

=== Bottom half ===
First round
7	(Chile) C Garín	4	4
(Czech Republic) D Svrčina	6	6
WC	(Dominican Republic) R Cid Subervi	0	5
(Belgium) A Blockx	6	7
(Argentina) RA Burruchaga	6	3	4
LL	(Hong Kong) C Wong	4	6	6
6	(Argentina) M Navone	6^{3}	6	6
WC	(Dominican Republic) N Hardt	7^{7}	2	2
Q	(Colombia) N Mejía	2	2
Alt	(Japan) S Mochizuki	6	6
(Spain) R Bautista Agut	6	6
Alt	(Belgium) D Goffin	1	4

Second round
(Czech Republic) D Svrčina	6^{3}	7^{10}	3
(Belgium) A Blockx	7^{7}	6^{8}	6
LL	(Hong Kong) C Wong	3	6	6
3	(Bosnia and Herzegovina) D Džumhur	6	4	2
6	(Argentina) M Navone	6	7
Alt	(Japan) S Mochizuki	4	5
(Spain) R Bautista Agut	4	6^{5}
2	(France) V Royer	6	7^{7}

Quarterfinals
(Belgium) A Blockx	4	7	6
LL	(Hong Kong) C Wong	6	5	3
6	(Argentina) M Navone	6	7^{7}
2	(France) V Royer	2	6^{5}

Semifinals
(Belgium) A Blockx	6	3	6^{3}
6	(Argentina) M Navone	3	6	7^{7}
