= 2025 Olbia Challenger – Singles =

Singles
- 2025 Olbia Challenger

Final
- Champion: (France) Luca Van Assche
- Runner-up: (Spain) Pablo Carreño Busta
- Score: 7–6^{(7–5)}, 6–7^{(1–7)}, 6–2

Events
Singles	Doubles
- Olbia Challenger

Martín Landaluce was the defending champion but lost in the semifinals to Pablo Carreño Busta.

Luca Van Assche won the title after defeating Carreño Busta 7–6^{(7–5)}, 6–7^{(1–7)}, 6–2 in the final.

== Seeds ==
1. (Chile) Alejandro Tabilo (quarterfinals)
2. (Czech Republic) Vít Kopřiva (second round)
3. (Spain) Martín Landaluce (semifinals)
4. (United States) Nishesh Basavareddy (first round)
5. (Spain) Roberto Carballés Baena (first round)
6. (Spain) Pablo Carreño Busta (final)
7. (Serbia) Dušan Lajović (quarterfinals)
8. (Tunisia) Moez Echargui (first round)

== Draw ==
Key

- Q = Qualifier
- WC = Wild card
- LL = Lucky loser
- Alt = Alternate
- ITF = ITF entry
- PR = Protected ranking
- SR = Special ranking
- SE = Special exempt
- JE = Junior exempt
- JR = Junior Accelerator Programme entrant
- CO = College Accelerator Programme entrant
- NG = Next Gen Accelerator Program entrant
- w/o = Walkover
- r = Retired
- d = Defaulted

=== Finals ===
Semifinals
6	(Spain) Pablo Carreño Busta	6	3	6
3	(Spain) Martín Landaluce	2	6	3
(France) Hugo Grenier	6	1	1
(France) Luca Van Assche	3	6	6

Final
6	(Spain) Pablo Carreño Busta	6^{5}	7^{7}	2
(France) Luca Van Assche	7^{7}	6^{1}	6

=== Top half ===
First round
1	(Chile) A Tabilo	4	6	7^{7}
Q	(Italy) Lorenzo Carboni	6	3	6^{4}
Q	(Estonia) D Glinka	7^{7}	6
Q	(France) C Tabur	6^{4}	3
(Canada) A Galarneau	6^{4}	3
(France) L Pavlovic	7^{7}	6
WC	(Italy) Pierluigi Basile	2	7^{7}	3
6	(Spain) P Carreño Busta	6	6^{5}	6
3	(Spain) M Landaluce	7	7
(Germany) J Engel	5	5
(Croatia) B Gojo	7	6
WC	(Italy) F Forti	5	4
(Slovakia) A Molčan	6	6
Alt	(Czech Republic) M Gengel	2	4
Q	(Italy) M Ribecai	2	6	1
7	(Serbia) D Lajović	6	4	6

Second round
1	(Chile) A Tabilo	6	5	6
Q	(Estonia) D Glinka	3	7	1
(France) L Pavlovic	6	1	2
6	(Spain) P Carreño Busta	3	6	6
3	(Spain) M Landaluce	6	3	6
(Croatia) B Gojo	3	6	3
(Slovakia) A Molčan	6^{6}	4
7	(Serbia) D Lajović	7^{8}	6

Quarterfinals
1	(Chile) A Tabilo	3	6	6^{3}
6	(Spain) P Carreño Busta	6	1	7^{7}
3	(Spain) M Landaluce	6	6
7	(Serbia) D Lajović	3	1

Semifinals
6	(Spain) P Carreño Busta	6	3	6
3	(Spain) M Landaluce	2	6	3

=== Bottom half ===
First round
5	(Spain) R Carballés Baena	2	5
(Bosnia and Herzegovina) N Fatić	6	7
(France) D Added	5	5
WC	(Italy) CA Caniato	7	7
Q	(Slovakia) N Gombos	6	6^{4}	6
(Italy) F Maestrelli	1	7^{7}	4
(France) H Grenier	3	6	6
4	(United States) N Basavareddy	6	4	2
8	(Tunisia) M Echargui	4	2
(Lithuania) E Butvilas	6	6
Q	(France) T Paris	2	0
NG	(France) A Géa	6	6
Alt	(Italy) S Travaglia	5	6	3
(France) L Van Assche	7	1	6
LL	(Italy) E Dalla Valle	3	4
2	(Czech Republic) V Kopřiva	6	6

Second round
(Bosnia and Herzegovina) N Fatić	3	6	6
WC	(Italy) CA Caniato	6	3	3
Q	(Slovakia) N Gombos	6^{4}	1
(France) H Grenier	7^{7}	6
(Lithuania) E Butvilas	6	3	6
NG	(France) A Géa	4	6	3
(France) L Van Assche	6	6
2	(Czech Republic) V Kopřiva	3	2

Quarterfinals
(Bosnia and Herzegovina) N Fatić	3	4
(France) H Grenier	6	6
(Lithuania) E Butvilas	3	5
(France) L Van Assche	6	7

Semifinals
(France) H Grenier	6	1	1
(France) L Van Assche	3	6	6
