= 2022 Vilnius Open =

Men's tennis tournament

- Date: 17 – 23 October
- Edition: 1st
- Category: ATP 80
- Surface: GreenSet Hard
- Location: Vilnius, Lithuania
- Venue: SEB Arena

Champions

Singles
- (Italy) Mattia Bellucci

Doubles
- (Monaco) Romain Arneodo / (Austria) Tristan-Samuel Weissborn
- Vilnius Open

The 2022 Vilnius Open, branded as Vilnius Open by kevin. for sponsorship reasons, was a professional tennis tournament played on indoor hard courts. It was the first edition of the tournament which was part of the 2022 ATP Challenger Tour. It took place in Vilnius, Lithuania between 17 and 23 October 2022.

== Singles main draw entrants ==
=== Seeds ===
Country	Player	Rank^{1}	Seed
CZE	Tomáš Macháč	108	1
LTU	Ričardas Berankis	128	2
ITA	Matteo Arnaldi	154	3
ITA	Gianluca Mager	167	4
SVK	Lukáš Klein	180	5
BIH	Nerman Fatić	199	6
FRA	Laurent Lokoli	204	7
FRA	Antoine Escoffier	211	8

- ^{1} Rankings are as of 10 October 2022.

=== Other entrants ===
The following players received wildcards into the singles main draw:

- (Lithuania) Edas Butvilas
- (Lithuania) Vilius Gaubas
- (Lithuania) Ainius Sabaliauskas

The following player received entry into the singles main draw as a special exempt:

- (Italy) Matteo Arnaldi

The following player received entry into the singles main draw as an alternate:

- (Norway) Viktor Durasovic

The following players received entry from the qualifying draw:

- (Morocco) ~~Elliot Benchetrit~~
- (Turkey) Cem İlkel
- (Estonia) Mark Lajal
- (France) Jules Marie
- (Czech Republic) David Poljak
- (Germany) Mats Rosenkranz

The following player received entry as a lucky loser:

- (France) Térence Atmane

== Champions ==
=== Singles ===
- (Italy) Mattia Bellucci def. (Turkey) Cem İlkel 1–6, 6–3, 7–5.

=== Doubles ===
- (Monaco) Romain Arneodo / (Austria) Tristan-Samuel Weissborn def. (France) Dan Added / (France) Théo Arribagé 6–4, 5–7, [10–5].
