= 2022 Vilnius Open – Doubles =

Doubles
- 2022 Vilnius Open

Final
- Champions: (Monaco) Romain Arneodo (Austria) Tristan-Samuel Weissborn
- Runners-up: (France) Dan Added (France) Théo Arribagé
- Score: 6–4, 5–7, [10–5]

Events
Singles	Doubles
- Vilnius Open

This was the first edition of the tournament.

Romain Arneodo and Tristan-Samuel Weissborn won the title after defeating Dan Added and Théo Arribagé 6–4, 5–7, [10–5] in the final.

== Seeds ==
1. (India) Ramkumar Ramanathan / (Poland) Szymon Walków (first round)
2. (Monaco) Romain Arneodo / (Austria) Tristan-Samuel Weissborn (champions)
3. (Italy) Marco Bortolotti / (Spain) Sergio Martos Gornés (quarterfinals)
4. (Czech Republic) Zdeněk Kolář / (India) Divij Sharan (first round)

== Draw ==
Key

- Q = Qualifier
- WC = Wild card
- LL = Lucky loser
- Alt = Alternate
- ITF = ITF entry
- PR = Protected ranking
- SR = Special ranking
- SE = Special exempt
- JE = Junior exempt
- JR = Junior Accelerator Programme entrant
- CO = College Accelerator Programme entrant
- NG = Next Gen Accelerator Program entrant
- w/o = Walkover
- r = Retired
- d = Defaulted

First round
1	(India) R Ramanathan (Poland) S Walków	4	2
(France) D Added (France) T Arribagé	6	6
I Liutarevich (Kazakhstan) G Lomakin	6	6
(Ukraine) V Manafov (Switzerland) L Margaroli	3	2
3	(Italy) M Bortolotti (Spain) S Martos Gornés	6	7^{7}
(Bosnia and Herzegovina) N Fatić (Bosnia and Herzegovina) A Šetkić	4	6^{4}
WC	(Spain) G García López (Lithuania) V Gaubas	3	4
PR	(Italy) J Ocleppo (Italy) S Travaglia	6	6
(Czech Republic) D Poljak (Finland) E Vasa	6	1	[6]
PR	(Italy) J Berrettini (Italy) Luca Potenza	4	6	[10]
WC	(Lithuania) R Berankis (Lithuania) E Butvilas	4	6	[10]
4	(Czech Republic) Z Kolář (India) D Sharan	6	3	[7]
(Ukraine) I Marchenko (Ukraine) D Molchanov	6	7^{8}
(Finland) P Niklas-Salminen (Netherlands) B Stevens	3	6^{6}
(Croatia) Z Babić (Australia) B Walkin	2	2
2	(Monaco) R Arneodo (Austria) T-S Weissborn	6	6

Quarterfinals
(France) D Added (France) T Arribagé	6	6
I Liutarevich (Kazakhstan) G Lomakin	4	3
3	(Italy) M Bortolotti (Spain) S Martos Gornés	3	4
PR	(Italy) J Ocleppo (Italy) S Travaglia	6	6
PR	(Italy) J Berrettini (Italy) L Potenza	6	7
WC	(Lithuania) R Berankis (Lithuania) E Butvilas	4	5
(Ukraine) I Marchenko (Ukraine) D Molchanov	1	4
2	(Monaco) R Arneodo (Austria) T-S Weissborn	6	6

Semifinals
(France) D Added (France) T Arribagé	6	7^{7}
PR	(Italy) J Ocleppo (Italy) S Travaglia	4	6^{3}
PR	(Italy) J Berrettini (Italy) L Potenza	1	4
2	(Monaco) R Arneodo (Austria) T-S Weissborn	6	6

Final
(France) D Added (France) T Arribagé	4	7	[5]
2	(Monaco) R Arneodo (Austria) T-S Weissborn	6	5	[10]
