= 2025 Copa Cap Cana – Doubles =

Doubles
- 2025 Copa Cap Cana

Final
- Champions: (Ecuador) Gonzalo Escobar (Ecuador) Diego Hidalgo
- Runners-up: (Czech Republic) Petr Nouza (Czech Republic) Patrik Rikl
- Score: 7–6^{(7–5)}, 6–4

Events
Singles	Doubles
- Copa Cap Cana

This was the first edition of the tournament.

Gonzalo Escobar and Diego Hidalgo won the title after defeating Petr Nouza and Patrik Rikl 7–6^{(7–5)}, 6–4 in the final.

== Seeds ==
1. (Argentina) Guido Andreozzi / (France) Théo Arribagé (quarterfinals)
2. (Portugal) Francisco Cabral / (Germany) Hendrik Jebens (semifinals)
3. (Mexico) Santiago González / (Austria) Lucas Miedler (quarterfinals)
4. (India) Sriram Balaji / (Mexico) Miguel Ángel Reyes-Varela (quarterfinals)

== Draw ==
Key

- Q = Qualifier
- WC = Wild card
- LL = Lucky loser
- Alt = Alternate
- ITF = ITF entry
- PR = Protected ranking
- SR = Special ranking
- SE = Special exempt
- JE = Junior exempt
- JR = Junior Accelerator Programme entrant
- CO = College Accelerator Programme entrant
- NG = Next Gen Accelerator Program entrant
- w/o = Walkover
- r = Retired
- d = Defaulted

=== Draw ===
First round
(Colombia) N Mejía (Hong Kong) C Wong
(Germany) J Schnaitter (Germany) M Wallner	w/o
3	(Mexico) S González (Austria) L Miedler	7^{7}	6
(Colombia) N Barrientos (India) RC Bollipalli	6^{5}	3
(Bulgaria) Dian Nedev (Bulgaria) P Nesterov	2	4
(Czech Republic) P Nouza (Czech Republic) P Rikl	6	6
WC	(Dominican Republic) P Bertran (Dominican Republic) R Cid Subervi	1	1
(Ecuador) G Escobar (Ecuador) D Hidalgo	6	6
(United States) T Boyer (United States) G Nanda	1	3
4	(India) S Balaji (Mexico) M Reyes-Varela	6	6
(United States) R Cash (United States) JJ Tracy	6	4	[10]
(United Kingdom) B Harris (United Kingdom) J Paris	4	6	[5]
WC	(Italy) F Baldi (Italy) F Fognini	2	6	[9]
2	(Portugal) F Cabral (Germany) H Jebens	6	3	[11]

Quarterfinals
1	(Argentina) G Andreozzi (France) T Arribagé	4	3
(Germany) J Schnaitter (Germany) M Wallner	6	6
3	(Mexico) S González (Austria) L Miedler	6	6^{2}	[10]
(Czech Republic) P Nouza (Czech Republic) P Rikl	4	7^{7}	[12]
(Ecuador) G Escobar (Ecuador) D Hidalgo	6	7
4	(India) S Balaji (Mexico) M Reyes-Varela	4	5
(United States) R Cash (United States) JJ Tracy	5	3
2	(Portugal) F Cabral (Germany) H Jebens	7	6

Semifinals
(Germany) J Schnaitter (Germany) M Wallner	6	3	[9]
(Czech Republic) P Nouza (Czech Republic) P Rikl	3	6	[11]
(Ecuador) G Escobar (Ecuador) D Hidalgo	6	3	[10]
2	(Portugal) F Cabral (Germany) H Jebens	2	6	[7]

Final
(Czech Republic) P Nouza (Czech Republic) P Rikl	6^{5}	4
(Ecuador) G Escobar (Ecuador) D Hidalgo	7^{7}	6
