= 2024 Olbia Challenger =

- Date: 14–20 October
- Edition: 2nd
- Surface: Hard
- Location: Olbia, Italy

Champions

Singles
- (Spain) Martín Landaluce

Doubles
- (Ukraine) Oleksii Krutykh / (Ukraine) Vitaliy Sachko
← 2023 ·	Olbia Challenger	· 2025 →

The 2024 Olbia Challenger was a professional tennis tournament played on hardcourts. It was the second edition of the tournament which was part of the 2024 ATP Challenger Tour. It took place in Olbia, Italy between 14 and 20 October 2024.

== Singles main-draw entrants ==
=== Seeds ===
Country	Player	Rank^{1}	Seed
ITA	Luca Nardi	89	1
ITA	Mattia Bellucci	101	2
FRA	Harold Mayot	107	3
CRO	Duje Ajduković	117	4
ARG	Marco Trungelliti	136	5
FRA	Constant Lestienne	138	6
ITA	Matteo Gigante	152	7
GBR	Jan Choinski	177	8

- ^{1} Rankings are as of 30 September 2024.

=== Other entrants ===
The following players received wildcards into the singles main draw:

- (Italy) Mattia Bellucci
- (Italy) Federico Cinà
- (Italy) Luca Nardi

The following players received entry into the singles main draw as alternates:

- (Italy) Jacopo Berrettini
- (Austria) Dennis Novak

The following players received entry from the qualifying draw:

- (Czech Republic) Hynek Bartoň
- (Canada) Steven Diez
- (Uzbekistan) Sergey Fomin
- (Ukraine) Oleksii Krutykh
- (France) Laurent Lokoli
- (Spain) Daniel Mérida

== Champions ==
=== Singles ===
- (Spain) Martín Landaluce def. (Italy) Mattia Bellucci 6–4, 6–4.

=== Doubles ===
- (Ukraine) Oleksii Krutykh / (Ukraine) Vitaliy Sachko def. (Spain) Íñigo Cervantes / (Austria) David Pichler 4–6, 6–1, [10–5].
