= 2026 Copa Cap Cana – Doubles =

Doubles
- 2026 Copa Cap Cana

Final
- Champions: (Monaco) Romain Arneodo (Brazil) Marcelo Demoliner
- Runners-up: (Israel) Daniel Cukierman (United States) Trey Hilderbrand
- Score: 7–6^{(7–2)}, 3–6, [10–6]

Events
Singles	Doubles
- Copa Cap Cana

Gonzalo Escobar and Diego Hidalgo were the defending champions but chose not to defend their title.

Romain Arneodo and Marcelo Demoliner won the title after defeating Daniel Cukierman and Trey Hilderbrand 7–6^{(7–2)}, 3–6, [10–6] in the final.

== Seeds ==
1. (Mexico) Santiago González / (Netherlands) David Pel (quarterfinals)
2. (Germany) Jakob Schnaitter / (Germany) Mark Wallner (quarterfinals)
3. (United States) Vasil Kirkov / (Netherlands) Bart Stevens (quarterfinals)
4. (Belgium) Sander Gillé / (Netherlands) Sem Verbeek (first round)

== Draw ==
Key

- Q = Qualifier
- WC = Wild card
- LL = Lucky loser
- Alt = Alternate
- ITF = ITF entry
- PR = Protected ranking
- SR = Special ranking
- SE = Special exempt
- JE = Junior exempt
- JR = Junior Accelerator Programme entrant
- CO = College Accelerator Programme entrant
- NG = Next Gen Accelerator Program entrant
- w/o = Walkover
- r = Retired
- d = Defaulted

First round
1	(Mexico) S González (Netherlands) D Pel	6	7^{7}
Alt	(Canada) L Draxl (Antigua and Barbuda) J Maginley	1	6^{4}
(Israel) D Cukierman (United States) T Hilderbrand	6	1	[10]
WC	(Poland) H Hurkacz (Poland) Mateusz Terczyński	4	6	[5]
3	(United States) V Kirkov (Netherlands) B Stevens	6^{2}	6	[10]
PR	(India) RC Bollipalli (India) A Kadhe	7^{7}	2	[4]
(India) S Balaji (Austria) N Oberleitner	7^{7}	6
(Uruguay) A Behar (United Kingdom) J Paris	6^{4}	4
(New Zealand) F Reynolds (New Zealand) J Watt	5	3
(Monaco) R Arneodo (Brazil) M Demoliner	7	6
(Chile) T Barrios Vera (Argentina) RA Burruchaga	6	6^{8}	[10]
4	(Belgium) S Gillé (Netherlands) S Verbeek	4	7^{10}	[0]
(Brazil) M Melo (Netherlands) J-J Rojer	7	7
(France) A Reymond (France) L Sanchez	5	5
WC	(Dominican Republic) P Bertran (Dominican Republic) N Hardt	0	6^{3}
2	(Germany) J Schnaitter (Germany) M Wallner	6	7^{7}

Quarterfinals
1	(Mexico) S González (Netherlands) D Pel	4	4
(Israel) D Cukierman (United States) T Hilderbrand	6	6
3	(United States) V Kirkov (Netherlands) B Stevens	0	3
(India) S Balaji (Austria) N Oberleitner	6	6
(Monaco) R Arneodo (Brazil) M Demoliner	w/o
(Chile) T Barrios Vera (Argentina) RA Burruchaga
(Brazil) M Melo (Netherlands) J-J Rojer	7^{8}	6
2	(Germany) J Schnaitter (Germany) M Wallner	6^{6}	1

Semifinals
(Israel) D Cukierman (United States) T Hilderbrand	3	7^{7}	[10]
(India) S Balaji (Austria) N Oberleitner	6	6^{5}	[8]
(Monaco) R Arneodo (Brazil) M Demoliner	6	5	[10]
(Brazil) M Melo (Netherlands) J-J Rojer	1	7	[5]

Final
(Israel) D Cukierman (United States) T Hilderbrand	6^{2}	6	[6]
(Monaco) R Arneodo (Brazil) M Demoliner	7^{7}	3	[10]
