= 2025 Copa Cap Cana =

- Date: 11–16 March
- Edition: 1st
- Surface: Hard
- Location: Punta Cana, Dominican Republic

Champions

Singles
- (United States) Aleksandar Kovacevic

Doubles
- (Ecuador) Gonzalo Escobar / (Ecuador) Diego Hidalgo
- Copa Cap Cana

The 2025 Copa Cap Cana was a professional tennis tournament played on hardcourts. It was the first edition of the tournament which was part of the 2025 ATP Challenger Tour. It took place in Punta Cana, Dominican Republic between 11 and 16 March 2025.

== Singles main draw entrants ==
=== Seeds ===
Country	Player	Rank^{1}	Seed
FRA	Alexandre Müller	44	1
ARG	Tomás Martín Etcheverry	45	2
SRB	Miomir Kecmanović	49	3
BEL	David Goffin	56	4
CZE	Jakub Menšík	57	5
FRA	Benjamin Bonzi	62	6
ITA	Mattia Bellucci	70	7
GBR	Cameron Norrie	77	8

- ^{1} Rankings are as of 3 March 2025.

=== Other entrants ===
The following players received wildcards into the singles main draw:

- (Dominican Republic) Roberto Cid Subervi
- (Serbia) Miomir Kecmanović
- (Mexico) Rodrigo Pacheco Méndez

The following players received entry into the singles main draw as alternates:

- (Chile) Cristian Garín
- (United Kingdom) Billy Harris
- (France) Constant Lestienne
- (Australia) Tristan Schoolkate
- (Japan) Sho Shimabukuro
- (Hong Kong) Coleman Wong

The following players received entry from the qualifying draw:

- (Australia) James McCabe
- (Colombia) Nicolás Mejía
- (United States) Govind Nanda
- (Japan) Rei Sakamoto

== Champions ==
=== Singles ===
- (United States) Aleksandar Kovacevic def. (Bosnia and Herzegovina) Damir Džumhur 6–2, 6–3.

=== Doubles ===
- (Ecuador) Gonzalo Escobar / (Ecuador) Diego Hidalgo def. (Czech Republic) Petr Nouza / (Czech Republic) Patrik Rikl 7–6^{(7–5)}, 6–4.
