= 2023 Olbia Challenger – Doubles =

Doubles
- 2023 Olbia Challenger

Final
- Champions: (India) Rithvik Choudary Bollipalli (India) Arjun Kadhe
- Runners-up: (Serbia) Ivan Sabanov (Serbia) Matej Sabanov
- Score: 6–1, 6–3

Events
| Singles | Doubles |
- Olbia Challenger

This was the first edition of the tournament.

Rithvik Choudary Bollipalli and Arjun Kadhe won the title after defeating Ivan and Matej Sabanov 6–1, 6–3 in the final.

== Seeds ==
1. (France) Théo Arribagé / (France) Luca Sanchez (first round)
2. (Australia) Andrew Harris / (Australia) John-Patrick Smith (quarterfinals)
3. (India) Anirudh Chandrasekar / (India) Vijay Sundar Prashanth (quarterfinals)
4. Ivan Liutarevich / (Ukraine) Vladyslav Manafov (first round)

== Draw ==
Key

- Q = Qualifier
- WC = Wild card
- LL = Lucky loser
- Alt = Alternate
- ITF = ITF entry
- PR = Protected ranking
- SR = Special ranking
- SE = Special exempt
- JE = Junior exempt
- JR = Junior Accelerator Programme entrant
- CO = College Accelerator Programme entrant
- NG = Next Gen Accelerator Program entrant
- w/o = Walkover
- r = Retired
- d = Defaulted

First round
1 | (France) T Arribagé (France) L Sanchez | 6^{2} | 7^{7} | [10]
(France) B Paire (Spain) D Rincón | 7^{7} | 6^{2} | [12]
(Serbia) I Sabanov (Serbia) M Sabanov | 6 | 4 | [10]
(Spain) Í Cervantes (India) J Nedunchezhiyan | 2 | 6 | [4]
3 | (India) A Chandrasekar (India) VS Prashanth | 6 | 7^{7}
WC | (Italy) Peter Buldorini (Italy) Lorenzo Carboni | 3 | 6^{3}
(Italy) M Bortolotti (Spain) S Martos Gornés | 7 | 1 | [10]
WC | (Italy) F Forti (Italy) F Maestrelli | 5 | 6 | [4]
(Pakistan) A-u-H Qureshi (India) D Sharan | 6 | 2 | [6]
(France) J Eysseric (France) H Mayot | 4 | 6 | [10]
(Czech Republic) R Jebavý (Czech Republic) Z Kolář | 6 | 6
4 | I Liutarevich (Ukraine) V Manafov | 1 | 2
PR | (India) S Balaji (Germany) A Begemann | 3 | 4
(India) RC Bollipalli (India) A Kadhe | 6 | 6
(Poland) K Drzewiecki (Poland) S Walków | 4 | 4
2 | (Australia) A Harris (Australia) J-P Smith | 6 | 6

Quarterfinals
(France) B Paire (Spain) D Rincón | 4 | 5
(Serbia) I Sabanov (Serbia) M Sabanov | 6 | 7
3 | (India) A Chandrasekar (India) VS Prashanth | 4 | 4
(Italy) M Bortolotti (Spain) S Martos Gornés | 6 | 6
(France) J Eysseric (France) H Mayot | 2 | 4
(Czech Republic) R Jebavý (Czech Republic) Z Kolář | 6 | 6
(India) RC Bollipalli (India) A Kadhe | 6 | 6
2 | (Australia) A Harris (Australia) J-P Smith | 3 | 4

Semifinals
(Serbia) I Sabanov (Serbia) M Sabanov | 7 | 7
(Italy) M Bortolotti (Spain) S Martos Gornés | 5 | 5
(Czech Republic) R Jebavý (Czech Republic) Z Kolář | 6 | 6^{9} | [7]
(India) RC Bollipalli (India) A Kadhe | 2 | 7^{11} | [10]

Final
(Serbia) I Sabanov (Serbia) M Sabanov | 1 | 3
(India) RC Bollipalli (India) A Kadhe | 6 | 6
