= 2025 Orléans Open – Doubles =

Doubles
- 2025 Orléans Open

Final
- Champions: (France) Clément Chidekh (France) Luca Sanchez
- Runners-up: (France) Théo Arribagé (United Kingdom) Joshua Paris
- Score: 6–4, 6–2

Events
Singles	Doubles
← 2024 ·	Orléans Open	· 2026 →

Benjamin Bonzi and Sascha Gueymard Wayenburg were the defending champions but chose not to defend their title.

Clément Chidekh and Luca Sanchez won the title after defeating Théo Arribagé and Joshua Paris 6–4, 6–2 in the final.

== Seeds ==
1. (Germany) Hendrik Jebens / (France) Albano Olivetti (first round)
2. (Netherlands) Mick Veldheer / (Netherlands) Sem Verbeek (first round)
3. (France) Théo Arribagé / (United Kingdom) Joshua Paris (final)
4. (India) Jeevan Nedunchezhiyan / (Switzerland) Jakub Paul (first round)

== Draw ==
=== Key ===
- Q = Qualifier
- WC = Wild card
- LL = Lucky loser
- Alt = Alternate
- ITF = ITF entry
- PR = Protected ranking
- SR = Special ranking
- SE = Special exempt
- JE = Junior exempt
- JR = Junior Accelerator Programme entrant
- CO = College Accelerator Programme entrant
- NG = Next Gen Accelerator Program entrant
- w/o = Walkover
- r = Retired
- d = Defaulted

=== Draw ===
First round
1	(Germany) H Jebens (France) A Olivetti	4	6^{4}
PR	(Finland) Patrick Kaukovalta (Finland) E Ruusuvuori	6	7^{7}
WC	(France) K de Schepper (Netherlands) J Sels	0	4
(United States) T Hilderbrand (United States) M Kiger	6	6
4	(India) J Nedunchezhiyan (Switzerland) J Paul	6^{5}	6^{3}
(Slovakia) M Karol (Slovakia) L Klein	7^{7}	7^{7}
(France) C Chidekh (France) L Sanchez	7^{7}	7^{10}
(United States) P Kypson (Luxembourg) C Rodesch	6^{2}	6^{8}
WC	(France) Romain Andres (France) Adan Freire da Silva	2	4
(Canada) C Harper (United Kingdom) D Stevenson	6	6
(Serbia) I Sabanov (Serbia) M Sabanov	2	6^{4}
3	(France) T Arribagé (United Kingdom) J Paris	6	7^{7}
(Poland) S Kielan (Poland) S Walków	3	4
(France) P-H Herbert (Switzerland) D Stricker	6	6
(France) G Jacq (France) M Martineau	6	6
2	(Netherlands) M Veldheer (Netherlands) S Verbeek	3	3

Quarterfinals
PR	(Finland) P Kaukovalta (Finland) E Ruusuvuori	6	6
(United States) T Hilderbrand (United States) M Kiger	2	2
(Slovakia) M Karol (Slovakia) L Klein	6	6^{8}	[2]
(France) C Chidekh (France) L Sanchez	3	7^{10}	[10]
(Canada) C Harper (United Kingdom) D Stevenson	2	4
3	(France) T Arribagé (United Kingdom) J Paris	6	6
(France) P-H Herbert (Switzerland) D Stricker	6	3	[8]
(France) G Jacq (France) M Martineau	4	6	[10]

Semifinals
PR	(Finland) P Kaukovalta (Finland) E Ruusuvuori	6	3	[8]
(France) C Chidekh (France) L Sanchez	3	6	[10]
3	(France) T Arribagé (United Kingdom) J Paris	7^{7}	4	[10]
(France) G Jacq (France) M Martineau	6^{2}	6	[7]

Final
(France) C Chidekh (France) L Sanchez	6	6
3	(France) T Arribagé (United Kingdom) J Paris	4	2
