= 2026 Italian Open – Men's singles =

Men's singles
- 2026 Italian Open

Final
- Champion: (Italy) Jannik Sinner
- Runner-up: (Norway) Casper Ruud
- Score: 6–4, 6–4

Details
- Draw: 96 (12Q, 5WC)
- Seeds: 32

Events
Singles	men	women
Doubles	men	women
- Italian Open

Jannik Sinner defeated Casper Ruud in the final, 6–4, 6–4 to win the men's singles tennis title at the 2026 Italian Open. It was his tenth ATP Masters 1000 title, record-extending sixth consecutive ATP Masters 1000 title (dating to the 2025 Paris Masters) and 29th career ATP Tour title overall. Sinner became the second (after Novak Djokovic) and youngest player to complete the career Golden Masters. He was the second player, after Rafael Nadal in 2010, to win all three clay-court ATP Masters 1000 events in the same season, having also won Monte-Carlo and Madrid. He set a new record of 34 consecutive match wins at the ATP Masters 1000 level, surpassing Djokovic's achievement of 31. Sinner was the first Italian to win the Italian Open men's singles title in 50 years, since Adriano Panatta in 1976.

Carlos Alcaraz was the reigning champion, but withdrew before the tournament due to a wrist injury.

== Seeds ==
All seeds received a bye into the second round.

1. (Italy) Jannik Sinner (champion)
2. (Germany) Alexander Zverev (fourth round)
3. (Serbia) Novak Djokovic (second round)
4. (Canada) Félix Auger-Aliassime (second round)
5. (United States) Ben Shelton (second round)
6. (Australia) Alex de Minaur (second round)
7. Daniil Medvedev (semifinals)
8. (Italy) Lorenzo Musetti (fourth round)
9. (Kazakhstan) Alexander Bublik (third round)
10. (Italy) Flavio Cobolli (third round)
11. (Czech Republic) Jiří Lehečka (third round)
12. Andrey Rublev (quarterfinals)
13. Karen Khachanov (quarterfinals)
14. (Monaco) Valentin Vacherot (withdrew)
15. (France) Arthur Fils (second round, retired)
16. (United States) Tommy Paul (third round)
17. (United Kingdom) Cameron Norrie (second round)
18. (Italy) Luciano Darderi (semifinals)
19. (United States) Learner Tien (fourth round)
20. (United States) Frances Tiafoe (third round)
21. (Spain) Alejandro Davidovich Fokina (third round)
22. (France) Arthur Rinderknech (withdrew)
23. (Norway) Casper Ruud (final)
24. (Argentina) Tomás Martín Etcheverry (second round)
25. (Argentina) Francisco Cerúndolo (third round)
26. (Czech Republic) Jakub Menšík (second round)
27. (Brazil) João Fonseca (second round)
28. (France) Corentin Moutet (second round)
29. (Netherlands) Tallon Griekspoor (second round)
30. (United States) Brandon Nakashima (third round)
31. (France) Ugo Humbert (third round)
32. (Spain) Rafael Jódar (quarterfinals)

Click on the seed number of a player to go to their draw section.

== Draw ==
Key

- Q = Qualifier
- WC = Wild card
- LL = Lucky loser
- Alt = Alternate
- ITF = ITF entry
- PR = Protected ranking
- SR = Special ranking
- SE = Special exempt
- JE = Junior exempt
- JR = Junior Accelerator Programme entrant
- CO = College Accelerator Programme entrant
- NG = Next Gen Accelerator Program entrant
- w/o = Walkover
- r = Retired
- d = Defaulted

=== Finals ===
Quarterfinals
1	(Italy) Jannik Sinner	6	6
12	Andrey Rublev	2	4
LL	(Spain) Martín Landaluce	6	4	5
7	Daniil Medvedev	1	6	7
23	(Norway) Casper Ruud	6	1	6
13	Karen Khachanov	1	6	2
32	(Spain) Rafael Jódar	6^{5}	7	0
18	(Italy) Luciano Darderi	7^{7}	5	6

Semifinals
1	(Italy) Jannik Sinner	6	5	6
7	Daniil Medvedev	2	7	4
23	(Norway) Casper Ruud	6	6
18	(Italy) Luciano Darderi	1	1

Final
1	(Italy) Jannik Sinner	6	6
23	(Norway) Casper Ruud	4	4

=== Top half ===
==== Section 1 ====
First round
(Austria) S Ofner	6	6
(United States) A Michelsen	3	3
(Australia) A Popyrin	6	6
(Italy) M Berrettini	2	3
(Italy) L Sonego	3	3
(Peru) I Buse	6	6
Q	(Italy) A Pellegrino	4	6	6
WC	(Italy) L Nardi	6	3	3

Second round
1	(Italy) J Sinner	6	6
(Austria) S Ofner	3	4
(Australia) A Popyrin	6	2	6
26	(Czech Republic) J Menšík	3	6	4
20	(United States) F Tiafoe	6^{5}	6	6
(Peru) I Buse	7^{7}	3	2
Q	(Italy) A Pellegrino	4
15	(France) A Fils	0^{r}

Third round
1	(Italy) J Sinner	6	6
(Australia) A Popyrin	2	0
20	(United States) F Tiafoe	6^{8}	1
Q	(Italy) A Pellegrino	7^{10}	6

Fourth round
1	(Italy) J Sinner	6	6
Q	(Italy) A Pellegrino	2	3

==== Section 2 ====
First round
Q	(Czech Republic) D Svrčina	2	3
(Serbia) M Kecmanović	6	6
Q	(Chile) C Garín	7^{7}	7
(Argentina) JM Cerúndolo	6^{2}	5
(Spain) R Bautista Agut	6	7^{7}
WC	(Italy) F Maestrelli	3	6^{2}
Q	(Georgia (country)) N Basilashvili	6	2	6
Q	(Spain) D Mérida	4	6	3

Second round
12	A Rublev	6	6
(Serbia) M Kecmanović	4	4
Q	(Chile) C Garín	6^{2}	4
21	(Spain) A Davidovich Fokina	7^{7}	6
30	(United States) B Nakashima	6	6
(Spain) R Bautista Agut	4	0
Q	(Georgia (country)) N Basilashvili	6	6^{5}	6
5	(United States) B Shelton	4	7^{7}	3

Third round
12	A Rublev	6	6
21	(Spain) A Davidovich Fokina	4	4
30	(United States) B Nakashima	6^{5}	4
Q	(Georgia (country)) N Basilashvili	7^{7}	6

Fourth round
12	A Rublev	3	7^{7}	6
Q	(Georgia (country)) N Basilashvili	6	6^{5}	2

==== Section 3 ====
First round
(Canada) D Shapovalov	4	2
(Argentina) M Navone	6	6
(Serbia) H Medjedovic	6	6
(France) V Royer	4	3
(Argentina) RA Burruchaga	4	4
(Italy) M Bellucci	6	6
(United States) M Giron	5	4
(Croatia) M Čilić	7	6

Second round
4	(Canada) F Auger-Aliassime	6^{4}	6^{5}
(Argentina) M Navone	7^{7}	7^{7}
(Serbia) H Medjedovic	3	6	7^{7}
27	(Brazil) J Fonseca	6	3	6^{1}
24	(Argentina) TM Etcheverry	7	2	3
(Italy) M Bellucci	5	6	6
(Croatia) M Čilić	4	4
LL	(Spain) M Landaluce	6	6

Third round
(Argentina) M Navone	6	3	4
(Serbia) H Medjedovic	4	6	6
(Italy) M Bellucci	4	3
LL	(Spain) M Landaluce	6	6

Fourth round
(Serbia) H Medjedovic	5	4
LL	(Spain) M Landaluce	7	6

==== Section 4 ====
First round
(Belgium) Z Bergs	3	4
(France) T Atmane	6	6
(Argentina) TA Tirante	6^{5}	6	6
WC	(Italy) G Cadenasso	7^{7}	4	0
(United States) E Quinn	3	7	3
Q	(Spain) P Llamas Ruiz	6	5	6
(Greece) S Tsitsipas	4	6^{4}
(Czech Republic) T Macháč	6	7^{7}

Second round
10	(Italy) F Cobolli	7^{7}	6
(France) T Atmane	6^{1}	3
(Argentina) TA Tirante	6	7
17	(United Kingdom) C Norrie	3	5
28	(France) C Moutet	4	6	6^{4}
Q	(Spain) P Llamas Ruiz	6	3	7^{7}
(Czech Republic) T Macháč
7	D Medvedev	w/o

Third round
10	(Italy) F Cobolli	3	4
(Argentina) TA Tirante	6	6
Q	(Spain) P Llamas Ruiz	6	4	2
7	D Medvedev	3	6	6

Fourth round
(Argentina) TA Tirante	3	2
7	D Medvedev	6	6

=== Bottom half ===
==== Section 5 ====
First round
Q	(United Kingdom) J Fearnley	6^{6}	6	2
(France) G Mpetshi Perricard	7^{8}	4	6
Q	(Spain) P Carreño Busta	2	1
(Chile) A Tabilo	6	6
(Argentina) M Trungelliti	6	4	6^{4}
(United States) Z Svajda	0	6	7^{7}
(Germany) J-L Struff	6	6
Q	(Argentina) F Comesaña	2	4

Second round
8	(Italy) L Musetti	6	6
(France) G Mpetshi Perricard	4	4
(Chile) A Tabilo	0	2
25	(Argentina) F Cerúndolo	6	6
23	(Norway) C Ruud	6	6
(United States) Z Svajda	1	3
(Germany) J-L Struff	6^{4}	3
11	(Czech Republic) J Lehečka	7^{7}	6

Third round
8	(Italy) L Musetti	7^{9}	6
25	(Argentina) F Cerúndolo	6^{7}	4
23	(Norway) C Ruud	6	6
11	(Czech Republic) J Lehečka	3	4

Fourth round
8	(Italy) L Musetti	3	1
23	(Norway) C Ruud	6	6

==== Section 6 ====
First round
(Argentina) C Ugo Carabelli	3	6	6^{5}
(Kazakhstan) A Shevchenko	6	4	7^{7}
(France) A Müller	5	3
(Netherlands) B van de Zandschulp	7	6
(Hungary) F Marozsán	3	3
(Czech Republic) V Kopřiva	6	6
(Hungary) M Fucsovics	4	3
Q	(Croatia) D Prižmić	6	6

Second round
13	K Khachanov	6	6
(Kazakhstan) A Shevchenko	4	4
(Netherlands) B van de Zandschulp	2	6	7^{7}
LL	(United States) A Kovacevic	6	2	6^{5}
31	(France) U Humbert	6	6
(Czech Republic) V Kopřiva	3	2
Q	(Croatia) D Prižmić	2	6	6
3	(Serbia) N Djokovic	6	2	4

Third round
13	K Khachanov	5	6	6
(Netherlands) B van de Zandschulp	7	4	4
31	(France) U Humbert	1	5
Q	(Croatia) D Prižmić	6	7

Fourth round
13	K Khachanov	6	7^{7}
Q	(Croatia) D Prižmić	1	6^{2}

==== Section 7 ====
First round
WC	(Italy) M Arnaldi	6	3	6
(Spain) J Munar	3	6	3
Q	(Netherlands) J de Jong	3	0
(Portugal) N Borges	6	6
(Bosnia and Herzegovina) D Džumhur	6	6
(France) A Mannarino	4	0
(United States) J Brooksby	3	6^{8}
(Argentina) S Báez	6	7^{10}

Second round
6	(Australia) A de Minaur	6	6^{5}	4
WC	(Italy) M Arnaldi	4	7^{7}	6
(Portugal) N Borges	6^{4}	4
32	(Spain) R Jódar	7^{7}	6
19	(United States) L Tien	6	6
(Bosnia and Herzegovina) D Džumhur	2	1
(Argentina) S Báez	1	2
9	(Kazakhstan) A Bublik	6	6

Third round
WC	(Italy) M Arnaldi	1	6	3
32	(Spain) R Jódar	6	4	6
19	(United States) L Tien	4	6	7
9	(Kazakhstan) A Bublik	6	3	5

Fourth round
32	(Spain) R Jódar	6	6
19	(United States) L Tien	1	4

==== Section 8 ====
First round
(Australia) A Vukic	6	5	6
Q	(United States) P Kypson	3	7	0
(Poland) H Hurkacz	7^{7}	6^{2}	2
(Germany) Y Hanfmann	6^{3}	7^{7}	6
WC	(Italy) F Cinà	6	1	3
(Belgium) A Blockx	4	6	6
PR	(China) Z Zhang	6	6^{3}	4
(Germany) D Altmaier	4	7^{7}	6

Second round
16	(United States) T Paul	6	6
(Australia) A Vukic	4	2
(Germany) Y Hanfmann	4	4
18	(Italy) L Darderi	6	6
29	(Netherlands) T Griekspoor	7^{7}	3	4
(Belgium) A Blockx	6^{5}	6	6
(Germany) D Altmaier	5	3
2	(Germany) A Zverev	7	6

Third round
16	(United States) T Paul	6	3	2
18	(Italy) L Darderi	3	6	6
(Belgium) A Blockx	1	4
2	(Germany) A Zverev	6	6

Fourth round
18	(Italy) L Darderi	1	7^{12}	6
2	(Germany) A Zverev	6	6^{10}	0

== Seeded players ==
The following are the seeded players. Seedings are based on ATP rankings as of 4 May 2026. Rankings and points before are as of 4 May 2026.

^{‡}	Champion
^{†}	Runner-up

Seed	Rank	Player	Points before	Points defending	Points won	Points after	Status
1	1	(Italy) Jannik Sinner^{‡}	14,350	650	1,000	14,700	Champion, defeated (Norway) Casper Ruud [23]
2	3	(Germany) Alexander Zverev	5,805	200	100	5,705	Fourth round lost to (Italy) Luciano Darderi [18]
3	4	(Serbia) Novak Djokovic	4,700	0	10	4,710	Second round lost to (Croatia) Dino Prižmić [Q]
4	5	(Canada) Félix Auger-Aliassime	4,050	0	10	4,060	Second round lost to (Argentina) Mariano Navone
5	6	(United States) Ben Shelton	4,030	10	10	4,030	Second round lost to (Georgia (country)) Nikoloz Basilashvili [Q]
6	8	(Australia) Alex de Minaur	3,755	100	10	3,665	Second round lost to (Italy) Matteo Arnaldi [WC]
7	9	Daniil Medvedev	3,460	100	400	3,760	Semifinals lost to (Italy) Jannik Sinner [1]
8	10	(Italy) Lorenzo Musetti	3,415	400	100	3,115	Fourth round lost to (Norway) Casper Ruud [23]
9	11	(Kazakhstan) Alexander Bublik	3,355	(175)^{Ω}	50	3,230	Third round lost to (United States) Learner Tien [19]
10	12	(Italy) Flavio Cobolli	2,750	10	50	2,790	Third round lost to (Argentina) Thiago Agustín Tirante
11	13	(Czech Republic) Jiří Lehečka	2,715	(50)^{∆}	50	2,715	Third round lost to (Norway) Casper Ruud [23]
12	14	Andrey Rublev	2,590	10	200	2,780	Quarterfinals lost to (Italy) Jannik Sinner [1]
13	15	Karen Khachanov	2,220	100	200	2,320	Quarterfinals lost to (Norway) Casper Ruud [23]
~~14~~	~~16~~	~~(Monaco) Valentin Vacherot~~	2,147	(44)^{Ω}	0	2,103	Withdrew due to left foot injury
15	17	(France) Arthur Fils	2,130	100	10	2,040	Second round retired against (Italy) Andrea Pellegrino [Q]
16	18	(United States) Tommy Paul	1,975	400	50	1,625	Third round lost to (Italy) Luciano Darderi [18]
17	19	(United Kingdom) Cameron Norrie	1,918	40	10	1,888	Second round lost to (Argentina) Thiago Agustín Tirante
18	20	(Italy) Luciano Darderi	1,890	30	400	2,260	Semifinals lost to (Norway) Casper Ruud [23]
19	21	(United States) Learner Tien	1,870	30	100	1,940	Fourth round lost to (Spain) Rafael Jódar [32]
20	22	(United States) Frances Tiafoe	1,865	10	50	1,905	Third round lost to (Italy) Andrea Pellegrino [Q]
21	23	(Spain) Alejandro Davidovich Fokina	1,820	(50)^{∆}	50	1,820	Third round lost to Andrey Rublev [12]
~~22~~	~~24~~	~~(France) Arthur Rinderknech~~	1,736	(25)^{∆}	0	1,711	Withdrew due to left calf injury
23	25	(Norway) Casper Ruud^{†}	1,735	200	650	2,185	Runner-up, lost to (Italy) Jannik Sinner [1]
24	26	(Argentina) Tomás Martín Etcheverry	1,660	(40)^{∆}	10	1,630	Second round lost to (Italy) Mattia Bellucci
25	27	(Argentina) Francisco Cerúndolo	1,620	100	50	1,570	Third round lost to (Italy) Lorenzo Musetti [8]
26	28	(Czech Republic) Jakub Menšík	1,600	100	10	1,510	Second round lost to (Australia) Alexei Popyrin
27	29	(Brazil) João Fonseca	1,435	10	10	1,435	Second round lost to (Serbia) Hamad Medjedovic
28	30	(France) Corentin Moutet	1,413	100	10	1,323	Second round lost to (Spain) Pablo Llamas Ruiz [Q]
29	31	(Netherlands) Tallon Griekspoor	1,360	30+50	10+10	1,300	Second round lost to (Belgium) Alexander Blockx
30	32	(United States) Brandon Nakashima	1,295	50	50	1,295	Third round lost to (Georgia (country)) Nikoloz Basilashvili [Q]
31	33	(France) Ugo Humbert	1,280	(50)^{∆}	50	1,280	Third round lost to (Croatia) Dino Prižmić [Q]
32	34	(Spain) Rafael Jódar	1,273	(12)^{∆}	200	1,461	Quarterfinals lost to (Italy) Luciano Darderi [18]

∆ The player is defending points from his 18th best tournament.
Ω The player is defending points from an ATP Challenger Tour event.

=== Withdrawn seeded players ===
The following players would have been seeded, but withdrew before the tournament began.

Rank	Player	Points before	Points defending	Points after	Withdrawal reason
2	(Spain) Carlos Alcaraz	12,960	1,000	11,960	Wrist injury
7	(United States) Taylor Fritz	3,770	(50)^{∆}	3,720	Knee injury

∆ The player is defending points from his 18th best tournament.

== Other entry information ==
=== Wildcards ===
- (Italy) Matteo Arnaldi
- (Italy) Gianluca Cadenasso
- (Italy) Federico Cinà
- (Italy) Francesco Maestrelli
- (Italy) Luca Nardi

=== Protected ranking ===
- (China) Zhang Zhizhen

=== Withdrawals ===
- ‡ (Spain) Carlos Alcaraz → replaced by (Austria) Sebastian Ofner
- ‡ (France) Arthur Cazaux → replaced by (Italy) Mattia Bellucci
- ‡ (Belgium) Raphaël Collignon → replaced by (France) Alexandre Müller
- ‡ (Canada) Gabriel Diallo → replaced by (Belgium) Alexander Blockx
- ‡ (United Kingdom) Jack Draper → replaced by (Serbia) Hamad Medjedovic
- ‡ (United States) Taylor Fritz → replaced by (United States) Zachary Svajda
- ‡ (United States) Sebastian Korda → replaced by (Italy) Matteo Berrettini
- ‡ (Poland) Kamil Majchrzak → replaced by (Spain) Roberto Bautista Agut
- ‡ (United States) Reilly Opelka → replaced by (Australia) Aleksandar Vukic
- † (France) Arthur Rinderknech → replaced by (United States) Aleksandar Kovacevic (LL)
- ‡ (Denmark) Holger Rune → replaced by (Bosnia and Herzegovina) Damir Džumhur
- † (Monaco) Valentin Vacherot → replaced by (Spain) Martín Landaluce (LL)

‡ – withdrew from entry list
† – withdrew from main draw

== Qualifying ==
=== Seeds ===
1. (Chile) Cristian Garín (qualified)
2. (Croatia) Dino Prižmić (qualified)
3. (United States) Patrick Kypson (qualified)
4. (Spain) Pablo Carreño Busta (qualified)
5. (Paraguay) Adolfo Daniel Vallejo (first round)
6. (United States) Aleksandar Kovacevic (qualifying competition, lucky loser)
7. (France) Luca Van Assche (first round)
8. (Spain) Martín Landaluce (qualifying competition, lucky loser)
9. (Australia) Rinky Hijikata (qualifying competition)
10. (Spain) Daniel Mérida (qualified)
11. (France) Benjamin Bonzi (first round)
12. (Argentina) Francisco Comesaña (qualified)
13. (Switzerland) Stan Wawrinka (qualifying competition, withdrew)
14. (Netherlands) Jesper de Jong (qualified)
15. (United Kingdom) Jacob Fearnley (qualified)
16. (France) Titouan Droguet (qualifying competition)
17. (France) Hugo Gaston (first round)
18. (United States) Emilio Nava (first round)
19. (Portugal) Henrique Rocha (first round)
20. (United Kingdom) Jan Choinski (qualifying competition)
21. (Georgia (country)) Nikoloz Basilashvili (qualified)
22. (Finland) Otto Virtanen (first round)
23. (Chile) Tomás Barrios Vera (qualifying competition)
24. (Lithuania) Vilius Gaubas (first round)

=== Qualifiers ===
1. (Chile) Cristian Garín
2. (Croatia) Dino Prižmić
3. (United States) Patrick Kypson
4. (Spain) Pablo Carreño Busta
5. (Spain) Pablo Llamas Ruiz
6. (United Kingdom) Jacob Fearnley
7. (Netherlands) Jesper de Jong
8. (Italy) Andrea Pellegrino
9. (Georgia (country)) Nikoloz Basilashvili
10. (Spain) Daniel Mérida
11. (Czech Republic) Dalibor Svrčina
12. (Argentina) Francisco Comesaña

=== Lucky losers ===
1. (United States) Aleksandar Kovacevic
2. (Spain) Martín Landaluce

=== Qualifying draw ===
==== First qualifier ====
First round
1	(Chile) Cristian Garín	6	6
(Tunisia) Moez Echargui	0	2
(Serbia) Dušan Lajović	5	4
20	(United Kingdom) Jan Choinski	7	6

Qualifying competition
1	(Chile) Cristian Garín	6	3	6
20	(United Kingdom) Jan Choinski	2	6	2

==== Second qualifier ====
First round
2	(Croatia) Dino Prižmić	6	6
(Luxembourg) Chris Rodesch	4	3
WC	(Italy) Federico Bondioli	4	7^{8}	7
18	(United States) Emilio Nava	6	6^{6}	5

Qualifying competition
2	(Croatia) Dino Prižmić	6	6
WC	(Italy) Federico Bondioli	2	4

==== Third qualifier ====
First round
3	(United States) Patrick Kypson	6^{7}	7^{7}	6
(United Kingdom) Jack Pinnington Jones	7^{9}	6^{4}	3
WC	(Italy) Juan Cruz Martin Manzano	7	1	5
16	(France) Titouan Droguet	5	6	7

Qualifying competition
3	(United States) Patrick Kypson	7^{8}	6^{5}	7^{7}
16	(France) Titouan Droguet	6^{6}	7^{7}	6^{1}

==== Fourth qualifier ====
First round
4	(Spain) Pablo Carreño Busta	6	6
(United States) Martin Damm	3	3
(Italy) Stefano Travaglia	6	6^{5}	1
13	(Switzerland) Stan Wawrinka	4	7^{7}	6

Qualifying competition
4	(Spain) Pablo Carreño Busta	w/o
13	(Switzerland) Stan Wawrinka

==== Fifth qualifier ====
First round
5	(Paraguay) Adolfo Daniel Vallejo	3	6	4
(Portugal) Jaime Faria	6	4	6
Alt	(Spain) Pablo Llamas Ruiz	4	6	6
19	(Portugal) Henrique Rocha	6	3	1

Qualifying competition
(Portugal) Jaime Faria	6	2	3
Alt	(Spain) Pablo Llamas Ruiz	3	6	6

==== Sixth qualifier ====
First round
6	(United States) Aleksandar Kovacevic	6	7^{7}
WC	(Italy) Lorenzo Carboni	4	6^{4}
(Japan) Shintaro Mochizuki	3	1
15	(United Kingdom) Jacob Fearnley	6	6

Qualifying competition
6	(United States) Aleksandar Kovacevic	6	2	3
15	(United Kingdom) Jacob Fearnley	2	6	6

==== Seventh qualifier ====
First round
7	(France) Luca Van Assche	2	5
(Bolivia) Hugo Dellien	6	7
(Spain) Pedro Martínez	6^{5}	5
14	(Netherlands) Jesper de Jong	7^{7}	7

Qualifying competition
(Bolivia) Hugo Dellien	6	2	6^{4}
14	(Netherlands) Jesper de Jong	4	6	7^{7}

==== Eighth qualifier ====
First round
8	(Spain) Martín Landaluce	6	6
(Australia) Christopher O'Connell	2	3
(Italy) Andrea Pellegrino	6	6
17	(France) Hugo Gaston	1	3

Qualifying competition
8	(Spain) Martín Landaluce	3	6	2
(Italy) Andrea Pellegrino	6	2	6

==== Ninth qualifier ====
First round
9	(Australia) Rinky Hijikata	5	7^{7}	7^{7}
WC	(Italy) Pierluigi Basile	7	6^{4}	6^{4}
(Denmark) Elmer Møller	6	2	6^{3}
21	(Georgia (country)) Nikoloz Basilashvili	4	6	7^{7}

Qualifying competition
9	(Australia) Rinky Hijikata	3	2
21	(Georgia (country)) Nikoloz Basilashvili	6	6

==== Tenth qualifier ====
First round
10	(Spain) Daniel Mérida	7	6
(United States) Mackenzie McDonald	5	4
WC	(Italy) Jacopo Vasamì	3	4
23	(Chile) Tomás Barrios Vera	6	6

Qualifying competition
10	(Spain) Daniel Mérida	6	3	7^{7}
23	(Chile) Tomás Barrios Vera	3	6	6^{4}

==== Eleventh qualifier ====
First round
11	(France) Benjamin Bonzi	4	3
(Czech Republic) Dalibor Svrčina	6	6
(Norway) Nicolai Budkov Kjær	6^{5}	7^{7}	6
22	(Finland) Otto Virtanen	7^{7}	6^{3}	3

Qualifying competition
(Czech Republic) Dalibor Svrčina	6	6
(Norway) Nicolai Budkov Kjær	4	2

==== Twelfth qualifier ====
First round
12	(Argentina) Francisco Comesaña	6	6
(United Kingdom) Billy Harris	3	4
PR	(Switzerland) Leandro Riedi	6	6
24	(Lithuania) Vilius Gaubas	4	2

Qualifying competition
12	(Argentina) Francisco Comesaña	6	2	6
PR	(Switzerland) Leandro Riedi	4	6	4
