= 2025 Orléans Open =

- Date: 22 – 28 September
- Edition: 20th
- Surface: Hard (Indoor)
- Location: Orléans, France

Champions

Singles
- (Spain) Martín Landaluce

Doubles
- (France) Clément Chidekh / (France) Luca Sanchez
- Orléans Open

The 2025 CO'Met Orléans Open was a professional tennis tournament played on indoor hardcourts. It was the 20th edition of the tournament which was part of the 2025 ATP Challenger Tour. It took place in Orléans, France between 22 and 28 September 2025.

== Singles main-draw entrants ==
=== Seeds ===
Country	Player	Rank^{1}	Seed
BEL	Raphaël Collignon	89	1
FRA	Hugo Gaston	106	2
BEL	Alexander Blockx	120	3
SVK	Lukáš Klein	123	4
ESP	Martín Landaluce	139	5
ITA	Matteo Gigante	141	6
FRA	Pierre-Hugues Herbert	143	7
~~FRA~~	~~Harold Mayot~~	~~153~~	~~8~~
EST	Mark Lajal	156	9

- ^{1} Rankings are as of 15 September 2025.

=== Other entrants ===
The following players received wildcards into the singles main draw:

- (France) Grégoire Barrère
- (France) Clément Chidekh
- (France) Benoît Paire

The following player received entry into the singles main draw using a protected ranking:

- (Finland) Emil Ruusuvuori

The following players received entry into the singles main draw as alternates:

- (Lithuania) Edas Butvilas
- (Norway) Viktor Durasovic

The following players received entry from the qualifying draw:

- (Switzerland) Rémy Bertola
- (Switzerland) Marc-Andrea Hüsler
- (France) Maxime Janvier
- (France) Maé Malige
- (France) Lucas Poullain
- (France) Leo Raquillet

The following player received entry as a lucky loser:

- (France) Florent Bax

== Champions ==
=== Singles ===
- (Spain) Martín Landaluce def. (Belgium) Raphaël Collignon 6–7^{(6–8)}, 6–2, 6–3.

=== Doubles ===
- (France) Clément Chidekh / (France) Luca Sanchez def. (France) Théo Arribagé / (United Kingdom) Joshua Paris 6–4, 6–2.
