= 2026 Jinan Open – Singles =

Singles
- 2026 Jinan Open

Final
- Champion: (Italy) Mattia Bellucci
- Runner-up: (Spain) Martín Landaluce
- Score: 6–2, 4–6, 6–3

Events
Singles	Doubles
- Jinan Open

Arthur Cazaux was the defending champion but chose not to defend his title.

Mattia Bellucci won the title after defeating Martín Landaluce 6–2, 4–6, 6–3 in the final.

== Seeds ==
1. (Serbia) Miomir Kecmanović (first round)
2. (Australia) James Duckworth (first round)
3. (Czech Republic) Vít Kopřiva (second round)
4. (Argentina) Facundo Díaz Acosta (first round)
5. (Spain) Martín Landaluce (final)
6. (Czech Republic) Tomáš Macháč (quarterfinals)
7. (Croatia) Marin Čilić (second round)
8. (Italy) Mattia Bellucci (champion)

== Draw ==
Key

- Q = Qualifier
- WC = Wild card
- LL = Lucky loser
- Alt = Alternate
- ITF = ITF entry
- PR = Protected ranking
- SR = Special ranking
- SE = Special exempt
- JE = Junior exempt
- JR = Junior Accelerator Programme entrant
- CO = College Accelerator Programme entrant
- NG = Next Gen Accelerator Program entrant
- w/o = Walkover
- r = Retired
- d = Defaulted

=== Finals ===
Semifinals
8	(Italy) Mattia Bellucci	6	7^{7}
(Japan) Shintaro Mochizuki	2	6^{2}
5	(Spain) Martín Landaluce	7^{7}	6
Q	(Canada) Liam Draxl	6^{0}	3

Final
8	(Italy) Mattia Bellucci	6	4	6
5	(Spain) Martín Landaluce	2	6	3

=== Top half ===
First round
1	(Serbia) M Kecmanović	3	4
(Kazakhstan) A Shevchenko	6	6
SE	A Kachmazov	7^{7}	5	3
SE	(Japan) J Friend	6^{4}	7	6
Q	(France) L Pavlovic	7	6
(Australia) T Schoolkate	5	4
Alt	(Sweden) E Ymer	2	1
8	(Italy) M Bellucci	6	6
4	(Argentina) F Díaz Acosta	2	6^{6}
(Japan) S Mochizuki	6	7^{8}
(Australia) D Sweeny	2
(Australia) B Tomic	2^{r}
(United States) Andre Ilagan	2	2
Q	(Japan) Y Watanuki	6	6
(Australia) A Walton	3	6	1
7	(Croatia) M Čilić	6	3	6

Second round
(Kazakhstan) A Shevchenko	6	6
SE	(Japan) J Friend	0	4
Q	(France) L Pavlovic	4	4
8	(Italy) M Bellucci	6	6
(Japan) S Mochizuki	6	7^{7}
(Australia) D Sweeny	3	6^{5}
Q	(Japan) Y Watanuki	7	6
7	(Croatia) M Čilić	5	4

Quarterfinals
(Kazakhstan) A Shevchenko	4	4
8	(Italy) M Bellucci	6	6
(Japan) S Mochizuki	4	6	7^{7}
Q	(Japan) Y Watanuki	6	2	6^{2}

Semifinals
8	(Italy) M Bellucci	6	7^{7}
(Japan) S Mochizuki	2	6^{2}

=== Bottom half ===
First round
5	(Spain) M Landaluce	6	6
I Simakin	3	3
WC	(China) F Sun	3	5
WC	(China) J Cui	6	7
(Greece) S Sakellaridis	6^{5}	6	3
Alt	(United States) K Smith	7^{7}	3	6
Alt	P Kotov	1	1^{r}
3	(Czech Republic) V Kopřiva	6	4
6	(Czech Republic) T Macháč	6	6
(France) A Müller	3	4
Q	(Japan) H Matsuoka	2	3
(Australia) A Vukic	6	6
Q	I Ivashka	3
Q	M Sharipov	4^{r}
Q	(Canada) L Draxl	6	6
2	(Australia) J Duckworth	4	4

Second round
5	(Spain) M Landaluce	6	7
WC	(China) J Cui	4	5
Alt	(United States) K Smith	6	3	6
3	(Czech Republic) V Kopřiva	3	6	3
6	(Czech Republic) T Macháč	6	6
(Australia) A Vukic	2	1
Q	I Ivashka	4	6	4
Q	(Canada) L Draxl	6	0	6

Quarterfinals
5	(Spain) M Landaluce	3	6	6
Alt	(United States) K Smith	6	2	3
6	(Czech Republic) T Macháč	4	6	4
Q	(Canada) L Draxl	6	3	6

Semifinals
5	(Spain) M Landaluce	7^{7}	6
Q	(Canada) L Draxl	6^{0}	3
