= 2026 Jinan Open – Doubles =

Doubles
- 2026 Jinan Open

Final
- Champions: (Japan) Jay Friend (Chinese Taipei) Ray Ho
- Runners-up: (Netherlands) Thijmen Loof (Japan) Kaito Uesugi
- Score: 2–6, 7–6^{(7–5)}, [10–4]

Events
Singles	Doubles
- Jinan Open

Finn Reynolds and James Watt were the defending champions but chose not to defend their title.

Jay Friend and Ray Ho won the title after defeating Thijmen Loof and Kaito Uesugi 2–6, 7–6^{(7–5)}, [10–4] in the final.

== Seeds ==
1. (United States) Evan King / (United States) Ryan Seggerman (semifinals)
2. (Netherlands) Jean-Julien Rojer / (United States) Theodore Winegar (semifinals)
3. (Netherlands) Thijmen Loof / (Japan) Kaito Uesugi (final)
4. (India) Siddhant Banthia / (New Zealand) Ajeet Rai (quarterfinals)

== Draw ==
Key

- Q = Qualifier
- WC = Wild card
- LL = Lucky loser
- Alt = Alternate
- ITF = ITF entry
- PR = Protected ranking
- SR = Special ranking
- SE = Special exempt
- JE = Junior exempt
- JR = Junior Accelerator Programme entrant
- CO = College Accelerator Programme entrant
- NG = Next Gen Accelerator Program entrant
- w/o = Walkover
- r = Retired
- d = Defaulted

First round
1	(United States) E King (United States) R Seggerman	6	6
WC	(China) J Cui (China) F Sun	3	4
(Australia) Ja Delaney (Australia) Je Delaney	6^{1}	7^{7}	[10]
WC	(China) Jin Yuquan (China) Sun Qian	7^{7}	6^{4}	[3]
4	(India) S Banthia (New Zealand) A Rai	7	6
(Chinese Taipei) J Hsu (United States) Andre Ilagan	5	1
(Thailand) P Isaro (China) A Wang	3	2
(Japan) J Friend (Chinese Taipei) R Ho	6	6
(Australia) B Bayldon (Australia) T Fancutt	7	2	[10]
(Japan) S Mochizuki (Japan) K Uchida	5	6	[6]
(Australia) J Kubler (Australia) T Schoolkate	6	4	[3]
3	(Netherlands) T Loof (Japan) K Uesugi	4	6	[10]
(Australia) C Puttergill (Australia) D Sweeny	6	7
Alt	S Betov (Chinese Taipei) C-p Hsieh	2	5
Alt	(France) L Pavlovic (France) Paul Valsecchi	3	6^{1}
2	(Netherlands) J-J Rojer (United States) T Winegar	6	7^{7}

Quarterfinals
1	(United States) E King (United States) R Seggerman	6	3	[10]
(Australia) Ja Delaney (Australia) Je Delaney	3	6	[8]
4	(India) S Banthia (New Zealand) A Rai	6^{3}	3
(Japan) J Friend (Chinese Taipei) R Ho	7^{7}	6
(Australia) B Bayldon (Australia) T Fancutt	6	6^{6}	[6]
3	(Netherlands) T Loof (Japan) K Uesugi	2	7^{8}	[10]
(Australia) C Puttergill (Australia) D Sweeny	4	3
2	(Netherlands) J-J Rojer (United States) T Winegar	6	6

Semifinals
1	(United States) E King (United States) R Seggerman	6^{5}	4
(Japan) J Friend (Chinese Taipei) R Ho	7^{7}	6
3	(Netherlands) T Loof (Japan) K Uesugi	6	6
2	(Netherlands) J-J Rojer (United States) T Winegar	4	4

Final
(Japan) J Friend (Chinese Taipei) R Ho	2	7^{7}	[10]
3	(Netherlands) T Loof (Japan) K Uesugi	6	6^{5}	[4]
