= 2025 Orléans Open – Singles =

Singles
- 2025 Orléans Open

Final
- Champion: (Spain) Martín Landaluce
- Runner-up: (Belgium) Raphaël Collignon
- Score: 6–7^{(6–8)}, 6–2, 6–3

Events
Singles	Doubles
- Orléans Open

Jacob Fearnley was the defending champion but chose not to defend his title.

Martín Landaluce won the title after defeating Raphaël Collignon 6–7^{(6–8)}, 6–2, 6–3 in the final.

== Seeds ==
1. (Belgium) Raphaël Collignon (final)
2. (France) Hugo Gaston (first round)
3. (Belgium) Alexander Blockx (second round)
4. (Slovakia) Lukáš Klein (second round)
5. (Spain) Martín Landaluce (champion)
6. (Italy) Matteo Gigante (second round, withdrew)
7. (France) Pierre-Hugues Herbert (second round)
8. (France) Harold Mayot (withdrew)
9. (Estonia) Mark Lajal (semifinals)

== Draw ==
Key

- Q = Qualifier
- WC = Wild card
- LL = Lucky loser
- Alt = Alternate
- ITF = ITF entry
- PR = Protected ranking
- SR = Special ranking
- SE = Special exempt
- JE = Junior exempt
- JR = Junior Accelerator Programme entrant
- CO = College Accelerator Programme entrant
- NG = Next Gen Accelerator Program entrant
- w/o = Walkover
- r = Retired
- d = Defaulted

=== Finals ===
Semifinals
1	(Belgium) Raphaël Collignon	7^{7}	6
(Germany) Justin Engel	6^{3}	3
9	(Estonia) Mark Lajal	3	7^{8}	4
5	(Spain) Martín Landaluce	6	6^{6}	6

Final
1	(Belgium) Raphaël Collignon	7^{8}	2	3
5	(Spain) Martín Landaluce	6^{6}	6	6

=== Top half ===
First round
1	(Belgium) R Collignon	6	6
Q	(France) L Poullain	4	2
(Tunisia) M Echargui	4	6	1
(Belgium) K Coppejans	6	3	6
(Canada) A Galarneau	7^{7}	6
PR	(Finland) E Ruusuvuori	6^{5}	2
Q	(Switzerland) M-A Hüsler	3	4
7	(France) P-H Herbert	6	6
4	(Slovakia) L Klein	3	6	7^{7}
(France) H Grenier	6	4	6^{4}
(United States) P Kypson	6	7^{10}
Q	(France) M Janvier	4	6^{8}
(Germany) J Engel	6	6
WC	(France) G Barrère	3	4
WC	(France) C Chidekh	6^{5}	5
6	(Italy) M Gigante	7^{7}	7

Second round
1	(Belgium) R Collignon	6	6
(Belgium) K Coppejans	3	3
(Canada) A Galarneau	6	6
7	(France) P-H Herbert	4	4
4	(Slovakia) L Klein	3	6	3
(United States) P Kypson	6	3	6
(Germany) J Engel	w/o
6	(Italy) M Gigante

Quarterfinals
1	(Belgium) R Collignon	6	6
(Canada) A Galarneau	2	4
(United States) P Kypson	6^{4}	4
(Germany) J Engel	7^{7}	6

Semifinals
1	(Belgium) R Collignon	7^{7}	6
(Germany) J Engel	6^{3}	3

=== Bottom half ===
First round
9	(Estonia) M Lajal	6	6^{3}	7^{7}
Alt	(Norway) V Durasovic	3	7^{7}	6^{5}
(France) A Bouquier	1	6	4
(Luxembourg) C Rodesch	6	2	6
Q	(Switzerland) R Bertola	5
(France) C Hemery	0^{r}
LL	(France) F Bax	4	4
3	(Belgium) A Blockx	6	6
5	(Spain) M Landaluce	6	6
(Switzerland) D Stricker	2	2
Q	(France) Maé Malige	6	6
Q	(France) Leo Raquillet	1	3
WC	(France) B Paire	6	2	0^{r}
Alt	(Lithuania) E Butvilas	1	6	3
(Norway) N Budkov Kjær	6	6
2	(France) H Gaston	3	4

Second round
9	(Estonia) M Lajal	6	6
(Luxembourg) C Rodesch	4	2
Q	(Switzerland) R Bertola	6	6^{4}	6
3	(Belgium) A Blockx	3	7^{7}	3
5	(Spain) M Landaluce	6	6
Q	(France) M Malige	4	4
Alt	(Lithuania) E Butvilas	6	3	4
(Norway) N Budkov Kjær	4	6	6

Quarterfinals
9	(Estonia) M Lajal	6	3	6
Q	(Switzerland) R Bertola	4	6	3
5	(Spain) M Landaluce	6	6
(Norway) N Budkov Kjær	4	4

Semifinals
9	(Estonia) M Lajal	3	7^{8}	4
5	(Spain) M Landaluce	6	6^{6}	6
