= 2023 Olbia Challenger =

- Date: 16–22 October
- Edition: 1st
- Surface: Hard
- Location: Olbia, Italy

Champions

Singles
- (France) Kyrian Jacquet

Doubles
- (India) Rithvik Choudary Bollipalli / (India) Arjun Kadhe
Olbia Challenger	· 2024 →

The 2023 Olbia Challenger was a professional tennis tournament played on hardcourts. It was the first edition of the tournament which was part of the 2023 ATP Challenger Tour. It took place in Olbia, Italy between 16 and 22 October 2023.

== Singles main-draw entrants ==
=== Seeds ===
Country	Player	Rank^{1}	Seed
FRA	Alexandre Müller	81	1
FRA	Constant Lestienne	107	2
ARG	Thiago Agustín Tirante	111	3
SVK	Alex Molčan	113	4
ESP	Pedro Martínez	116	5
FRA	Corentin Moutet	119	6
ITA	Flavio Cobolli	121	7
FRA	Benoît Paire	123	8

- ^{1} Rankings are as of 2 October 2023.

=== Other entrants ===
The following players received wildcards into the singles main draw:

- (Italy) Lorenzo Carboni
- (South Africa) Lloyd Harris
- (Italy) Francesco Maestrelli

The following players received entry into the singles main draw as special exempts:

- (France) Ugo Blanchet
- (Belgium) Joris De Loore

The following player received entry into the singles main draw as an alternate:

- (Italy) Alessandro Giannessi

The following players received entry from the qualifying draw:

- (Switzerland) Rémy Bertola
- (France) Mathias Bourgue
- (Romania) Marius Copil
- (Italy) Francesco Forti
- (France) Kyrian Jacquet
- (Ukraine) Vladyslav Orlov

== Champions ==
=== Singles ===
- (France) Kyrian Jacquet def. (Italy) Flavio Cobolli 6–3, 6–4.

=== Doubles ===
- (India) Rithvik Choudary Bollipalli / (India) Arjun Kadhe def. (Serbia) Ivan Sabanov / (Serbia) Matej Sabanov 6–1, 6–3.
