= 2026 Copa Cap Cana =

- Date: 10–15 March
- Edition: 2nd
- Surface: Hard
- Location: Punta Cana, Dominican Republic

Champions

Singles
- (Argentina) Mariano Navone

Doubles
- (Monaco) Romain Arneodo / (Brazil) Marcelo Demoliner
- Copa Cap Cana

The 2026 Copa Cap Cana was a professional tennis tournament played on hardcourts. It was the second edition of the tournament which was part of the 2026 ATP Challenger Tour. It took place in Punta Cana, Dominican Republic between 10 and 15 March 2026.

== Singles main draw entrants ==
=== Seeds ===
Country	Player	Rank^{1}	Seed
SRB	Miomir Kecmanović	58	1
FRA	Valentin Royer	60	2
BIH	Damir Džumhur	64	3
POL	Hubert Hurkacz	71	4
BEL	Raphaël Collignon	77	5
ARG	Mariano Navone	79	6
CHI	Cristian Garín	90	7
AUS	Adam Walton	91	8

- ^{1} Rankings are as of 2 March 2026.

=== Other entrants ===
The following players received wildcards into the singles main draw:

- (Dominican Republic) Roberto Cid Subervi
- (Dominican Republic) Nick Hardt
- (Chile) Nicolás Jarry

The following players received entry into the singles main draw as alternates:

- (Belgium) David Goffin
- (United States) Mackenzie McDonald
- (Japan) Shintaro Mochizuki

The following players received entry from the qualifying draw:

- (Ecuador) Andrés Andrade
- (Spain) Martín Landaluce
- (Colombia) Nicolás Mejía
- (France) Luca Van Assche

The following player received entry as a lucky loser:

- (Hong Kong) Coleman Wong

== Champions ==
=== Singles ===
- (Argentina) Mariano Navone def. (Italy) Mattia Bellucci 7–5, 6–4.

=== Doubles ===
- (Monaco) Romain Arneodo / (Brazil) Marcelo Demoliner def. (Israel) Daniel Cukierman / (United States) Trey Hilderbrand 7–6^{(7–2)}, 3–6, [10–6].
