= 2026 Jinan Open =

- Date: 12 – 18 October
- Edition: 6th
- Category: ATP Challenger Tour
- Surface: Hard
- Location: Jinan, China

Champions

Singles
- (Italy) Mattia Bellucci

Doubles
- (Japan) Jay Friend / (Chinese Taipei) Ray Ho
- Jinan Open

The 2026 Jinan Open was a professional tennis tournament played on outdoor hard courts. It was the sixth edition of the tournament and part of the 2026 ATP Challenger Tour. It took place in Jinan, China between 12 and 18 October 2026.

== Singles main-draw entrants ==
=== Seeds ===
Country	Player	Rank^{1}	Seed
SRB	Miomir Kecmanović	61	1
AUS	James Duckworth	64	2
CZE	Vít Kopřiva	68	3
ARG	Facundo Díaz Acosta	69	4
ESP	Martín Landaluce	73	5
CZE	Tomáš Macháč	75	6
CRO	Marin Čilić	80	7
ITA	Mattia Bellucci	86	8

- ^{1} Rankings are as of 5 October 2026.

=== Other entrants ===
The following players received wildcards into the singles main draw:

- (China) Cui Jie
- (China) ~~Shang Juncheng~~
- (China) Sun Fajing

The following players received entry into the singles main draw as special exempts:

- (Japan) Jay Friend
- Alibek Kachmazov

The following players received entry into the singles main draw as alternates:

- Pavel Kotov
- (United States) Keegan Smith
- (Sweden) Elias Ymer

The following players received entry from the qualifying draw:

- (Canada) Liam Draxl
- Ilya Ivashka
- (Japan) Hayato Matsuoka
- (France) Luka Pavlovic
- Marat Sharipov
- (Japan) Yosuke Watanuki

== Champions ==
=== Singles ===
- (Italy) Mattia Bellucci def. (Spain) Martín Landaluce 6–2, 4–6, 6–3.

=== Doubles ===
- (Japan) Jay Friend / (Chinese Taipei) Ray Ho def. (Netherlands) Thijmen Loof / (Japan) Kaito Uesugi 2–6, 7–6^{(7–5)}, [10–4].
