= Vilnius Open =

Defunct tennis tournament
- Event name: Vilnius Open by kevin.
- Sponsor: kevin.
- Founded: 2022; 3 years ago
- Location: Vilnius; Lithuania
- Venue: SEB Arena
- Surface: Hard (indoor)
- Website: website
ATP Tour
- Category: Challenger 80
- Draw: 32S / 24Q / 16D
- Prize money: €45,730 + H

The Vilnius Open, known as the Vilnius Open by kevin. for sponsorship reasons, was a professional tennis tournament, held in Vilnius, Lithuania, at the end of October since 2022. The event was held on the indoor hardcourts of the SEB Arena.

== Past finals ==
=== Men's singles ===
| Year | Champion | Runner-up | Score |
|---|---|---|---|
| 2022 | (Italy) Mattia Bellucci | (Turkey) Cem İlkel | 1–6, 6–3, 7–5 |

=== Men's doubles ===
| Year | Champions | Runners-up | Score |
|---|---|---|---|
| 2022 | (Monaco) Romain Arneodo (Austria) Tristan-Samuel Weissborn | (France) Dan Added (France) Théo Arribagé | 6–4, 5–7, [10–5] |

== See also ==
- Vitas Gerulaitis Cup
