= Ainius Sabaliauskas =

Lithuanian tennis player (born 2003)

- Country (sports): Lithuania
- Born: 26 July 2003 (age 22) Panevėžys, Lithuania
- Height: 1.91 m (6 ft 3 in)
- Plays: Left-handed (two-handed backhand)
- Prize money: US $6,023

Singles
- Career record: 1–1 (at ATP Tour level, Grand Slam level, and in Davis Cup)
- Career titles: 0
- Highest ranking: No. 1,545 (29 September 2025)
- Current ranking: No. 1,587 (13 April 2026)

Doubles
- Career record: 0–0 (at ATP Tour level, Grand Slam level, and in Davis Cup)
- Career titles: 0
- Highest ranking: No. 1,100 (13 June 2022)
- Current ranking: No. 1,293 (13 April 2026)
- Last updated on: 14 April 2026.

Ainius Sabaliauskas (born 26 July 2003) is a Lithuanian tennis player. Sabaliauskas has a career high ATP singles ranking of No. 1,545 achieved on 29 September 2025 and a career high ATP doubles ranking of No. 1,100 achieved on 13 June 2022.

Sabaliauskas represents Lithuania at the Davis Cup, where he has a W/L record of 1–1.
