= 2025 Olbia Challenger =

- Date: 13–19 October
- Edition: 3rd
- Surface: Hard
- Location: Olbia, Italy

Champions

Singles
- (France) Luca Van Assche

Doubles
- (France) Arthur Reymond / (France) Luca Sanchez
- Olbia Challenger

The 2025 Olbia Challenger was a professional tennis tournament played on hardcourts. It was the third edition of the tournament which was part of the 2025 ATP Challenger Tour. It took place in Olbia, Italy between 13 and 19 October 2025.

== Singles main-draw entrants ==
=== Seeds ===
Country	Player	Rank^{1}	Seed
CHI	Alejandro Tabilo	74	1
CZE	Vít Kopřiva	93	2
ESP	Martín Landaluce	111	3
USA	Nishesh Basavareddy	113	4
ESP	Roberto Carballés Baena	116	5
ESP	Pablo Carreño Busta	123	6
SRB	Dušan Lajović	126	7
TUN	Moez Echargui	145	8

- ^{1} Rankings are as of 29 September 2025.

=== Other entrants ===
The following players received wildcards into the singles main draw:

- (Italy) Pierluigi Basile
- (Italy) Carlo Alberto Caniato
- (Italy) Francesco Forti

The following player received entry into the singles main draw through the Next Gen Accelerator programme:

- (France) Arthur Géa

The following players received entry into the singles main draw as alternates:

- (Czech Republic) Marek Gengel
- (Italy) Stefano Travaglia

The following players received entry from the qualifying draw:

- (Italy) Lorenzo Carboni
- (Estonia) Daniil Glinka
- (Slovakia) Norbert Gombos
- (France) Tom Paris
- (Italy) Michele Ribecai
- (France) Clément Tabur

The following player received entry as a lucky loser:

- (Italy) Enrico Dalla Valle

== Champions ==
=== Singles ===
- (France) Luca Van Assche def. (Spain) Pablo Carreño Busta 7–6^{(7–5)}, 6–7^{(1–7)}, 6–2.

=== Doubles ===
- (France) Arthur Reymond / (France) Luca Sanchez def. (Romania) Victor Vlad Cornea / (Spain) Bruno Pujol Navarro 6–4, 6–1.
