= Copa Cap Cana =

- 2026 Copa Cap Cana

ATP Challenger Tour
- Location: Punta Cana, Dominican Republic
- Venue: Racquet Village
- Category: ATP Challenger Tour 175
- Surface: Hard
- Prize money: $300,000 (2026), $250,000 (2025)
- Website: Website

The Copa Cap Cana is a professional tennis tournament played on hardcourts. It is currently part of the ATP Challenger Tour. It was first held in Punta Cana, Dominican Republic in 2025.

== Past finals ==
=== Singles ===
Year	Champion	Runner-up	Score
2026	(Argentina) Mariano Navone	(Italy) Mattia Bellucci	7–5, 6–4
2025	(United States) Aleksandar Kovacevic	(Bosnia and Herzegovina) Damir Džumhur	6–2, 6–3

=== Doubles ===
Year	Champions	Runners-up	Score
2026	(Monaco) Romain Arneodo (Brazil) Marcelo Demoliner	(Israel) Daniel Cukierman (United States) Trey Hilderbrand	7–6^{(7–2)}, 3–6, [10–6]
2025	(Ecuador) Gonzalo Escobar (Ecuador) Diego Hidalgo	(Czech Republic) Petr Nouza (Czech Republic) Patrik Rikl	7–6^{(7–5)}, 6–4
