= Olbia Challenger =

- 2025 Olbia Challenger

ATP Challenger Tour
- Event name: Olbia Challenger
- Location: Olbia, Italy
- Venue: Tennis Club Terranova
- Category: ATP Challenger Tour 125
- Surface: Hard
- Prize money: €148,625
- Website: Website

The Olbia Challenger is a professional tennis tournament played on hardcourts. It is currently part of the ATP Challenger Tour. It was first held in Olbia, Italy in 2023.

== Past finals ==
=== Singles ===
Year	Champion	Runner-up	Score
2026	(Bosnia and Herzegovina) Damir Džumhur	(United Kingdom) Jacob Fearnley	7–6^{(7–4)}, 6–3
2025	(France) Luca Van Assche	(Spain) Pablo Carreño Busta	7–6^{(7–5)}, 6–7^{(1–7)}, 6–2
2024	(Spain) Martín Landaluce	(Italy) Mattia Bellucci	6–4, 6–4
2023	(France) Kyrian Jacquet	(Italy) Flavio Cobolli	6–3, 6–4

=== Doubles ===
Year	Champions	Runners-up	Score
2026	(Netherlands) Jarno Jans (Belgium) Joran Vliegen	(Israel) Daniel Cukierman (Brazil) Fernando Romboli	6–3, 6–4
2025	(France) Arthur Reymond (France) Luca Sanchez	(Romania) Victor Vlad Cornea (Spain) Bruno Pujol Navarro	6–4, 6–1
2024	(Ukraine) Oleksii Krutykh (Ukraine) Vitaliy Sachko	(Spain) Íñigo Cervantes (Austria) David Pichler	4–6, 6–1, [10–5]
2023	(India) Rithvik Choudary Bollipalli (India) Arjun Kadhe	(Serbia) Ivan Sabanov (Serbia) Matej Sabanov	6–1, 6–3
