= Martín Landaluce =

Spanish tennis player (born 2006)

- Full name: Martín Landaluce Lacambra
- Country (sports): Spain
- Residence: Madrid, Spain; Manacor, Spain
- Born: 8 January 2006 (age 20) Madrid, Spain
- Height: 1.93 m (6 ft 4 in)
- Plays: Right-handed (two-handed backhand)
- Coach: Óscar Burrieza; Esteban Carril; Tomeu Salva
- Prize money: US $1,921,059

Singles
- Career record: 15–28 (at ATP Tour level, Grand Slam level, and in Davis Cup)
- Career titles: 0
- Highest ranking: No. 55 (15 June 2026)
- Current ranking: No. 71 (9 November 2026)

Grand Slam singles results
- Australian Open: 1R (2025)
- French Open: 3R (2026)
- Wimbledon: 1R (2026)
- US Open: 1R (2026)

Doubles
- Career record: 1–2 (at ATP Tour level, Grand Slam level, and in Davis Cup)
- Career titles: 0
- Highest ranking: No. 543 (22 May 2023)
- Last updated on: 18 October 2026.

Martín Landaluce Lacambra (born 8 January 2006) is a Spanish professional tennis player. He has a career-high ATP singles ranking of world No. 55 achieved on 15 June 2026 and a best doubles ranking of No. 543 achieved on 22 May 2023.

== Early life ==
Landaluce was born in Madrid, Spain, to parents Alejandro Landaluce and Elena Lacambra. He has two siblings, Alejandra and Lucas.

Landaluce has trained at the Rafa Nadal Tennis Academy since his childhood.

== Junior tennis ==
Landaluce won the boys' singles category at the 2022 US Open, defeating second seed Gilles-Arnaud Bailly in the final.

Landaluce had good results on the ITF junior circuit, maintaining an 81–25 singles win-loss record, and reached an ITF junior combined ranking of world No. 1 on 27 February 2023.

== Professional career ==
=== 2022: ATP Tour debut ===
Landaluce made his ATP debut at the 2022 Gijón Open as a wildcard.

=== 2023: Masters debut in Madrid ===
Landaluce received a wildcard for the qualifying event at the 2023 Barcelona Open. The following week, he received a wildcard for the main draw at the 2023 Mutua Madrid Open making his ATP Masters 1000 debut.

=== 2024: First ATP win, maiden Challenger title ===
In February, Landaluce won his first professional title on the ITF Men's Tour, at M25 Vila Real de Santo António, Portugal, where he defeated Uzbek Khumoyun Sultanov in the final.

Ranked No. 359, Landaluce received a wildcard for the main draw at the 2024 Miami Open making his debut at that tournament, where he defeated compatriot Jaume Munar in the first round for his first ATP Tour and ATP Masters 1000 win. In the next round, he was defeated by 16th seed Ben Shelton in straight sets. He also received wildcards for the Barcelona Open and Mutua Madrid Open of that season.

In October, Landaluce won his maiden ATP Challenger title at the Olbia Challenger, Italy. At 18-years-old, Landaluce became the youngest Spanish champion at this level since Carlos Alcaraz at the Oeiras Open in 2021.

=== 2025: Major & NextGen & top 150 debuts ===
Landaluce made his Grand Slam debut after qualifying into the main draw of the 2025 Australian Open. He lost to wildcard entrant and local player James McCabe in the first round.

In September, Landaluce won his second 125-level Challenger singles trophy, at the CO'Met Orléans Open, France, defeating Belgian Raphaël Collignon in the final. As a result, he moved to fifth position in the ATP Live Race To Jeddah. In November, he officially qualified for the 2025 Next Gen ATP Finals, after being an alternate in the previous edition.

=== 2026: Two Masters quarterfinals, top 75 ===
In March, Landaluce reached his first ATP Masters 1000 quarterfinal at the 2026 Miami Open, as a qualifier. He defeated 17th seed Luciano Darderi, 14th seed Karen Khachanov, and 32nd seed Sebastian Korda. Ranked world No. 151, Landaluce became the lowest-ranked quarterfinalist at the event since No. 185 Jim Grabb in 1994. He was also the first player born in 2006 or later to advance to the last-eight stage at a Masters 1000 event. He lost to 21st seed Jiří Lehečka in the quarterfinals. As a result, he reached a new career-ranking of No. 106 on 30 March 2026 and entered the top 100 a month later, on 20 April 2026, before the 2026 Mutua Madrid Open.

At the 2026 Italian Open where he entered the main draw as a lucky loser, since in qualification had lost to Andrea Pellegrino, Landaluce reached the quarterfinals at a Masters level again, with wins over Mattia Bellucci and Hamad Medjedovic. As a result, he moved into the top 65 in the live singles rankings.

== Performance timeline ==
Key
W	F	SF	QF	#R	RR	Q#	DNQ	A	NH

(W) winner; (F) finalist; (SF) semifinalist; (QF) quarterfinalist; (#R) rounds 4, 3, 2, 1; (RR) round-robin stage; (Q#) qualification round; (DNQ) did not qualify; (A) absent; (NH) not held; (SR) strike rate (events won / competed); (W–L) win–loss record.

=== Singles ===
Tournament	2023	2024	2025	2026	SR	W–L	Win%
Grand Slam tournaments
Australian Open	A	A	1R	Q2	0 / 1	0–1	0%
French Open	A	A	Q2	3R	0 / 1	2–1	67%
Wimbledon	A	A	Q3	1R	0 / 1	0–1	0%
US Open	A	A	Q2	1R	0 / 1	0–1	0%
Win–loss	0–0	0–0	0–1	2–3	0 / 4	2–4	33%
ATP Masters 1000 tournaments
Indian Wells Open	A	A	A	Q2	0 / 0	0–0	–
Miami Open	A	2R	A	QF	0 / 2	5–2	71%
Monte-Carlo Masters	A	A	A	A	0 / 0	0–0	–
Madrid Open	1R	1R	1R	1R	0 / 4	0–4	0%
Italian Open	A	A	A	QF	0 / 1	3–1	75%
Canadian Open	A	A	A	1R	0 / 1	0–1	0%
Cincinnati Open	A	A	2R	3R	0 / 2	3–2	60%
Shanghai Masters	A	A	A	1R	0 / 1	0–1	0%
Paris Masters	A	A	A	Q1	0 / 0	0–0	–
Win–loss	0–1	1–2	1–2	9–6	0 / 11	11–11	50%

== ATP Challenger Tour finals ==
=== Singles: 3 (2 titles, 1 runner-up) ===
Result	W–L	Date	Tournament	Surface	Opponent	Score
Win	1–0	Oct 2024	Olbia Challenger, Italy	Hard	(Italy) Mattia Bellucci	6–4, 6–4
Win	2–0	Sep 2025	CO'Met Orléans Open, France	Hard (i)	(Belgium) Raphaël Collignon	6–7^{(6–8)}, 6–2, 6–3
Loss	2–1	Oct 2026	Jinan Open, China	Hard	(Italy) Mattia Bellucci	2–6, 6–4, 3–6

== ITF World Tennis Tour finals ==
=== Singles: 1 (title) ===
Result	W–L	Date	Tournament	Surface	Opponent	Score
Win	1–0	Feb 2024	M25 Vila Real de Santo António, Portugal	Hard	(Uzbekistan) Khumoyun Sultanov	6–0, 6–3

== Junior Grand Slam finals ==
=== Singles: 1 (title) ===
Result	Year	Tournament	Surface	Opponent	Score
Win	2022	US Open	Hard	(Belgium) Gilles-Arnaud Bailly	7–6^{(7–3)}, 5–7, 6–2
