= Mattia Bellucci =

Italian tennis player (born 2001)

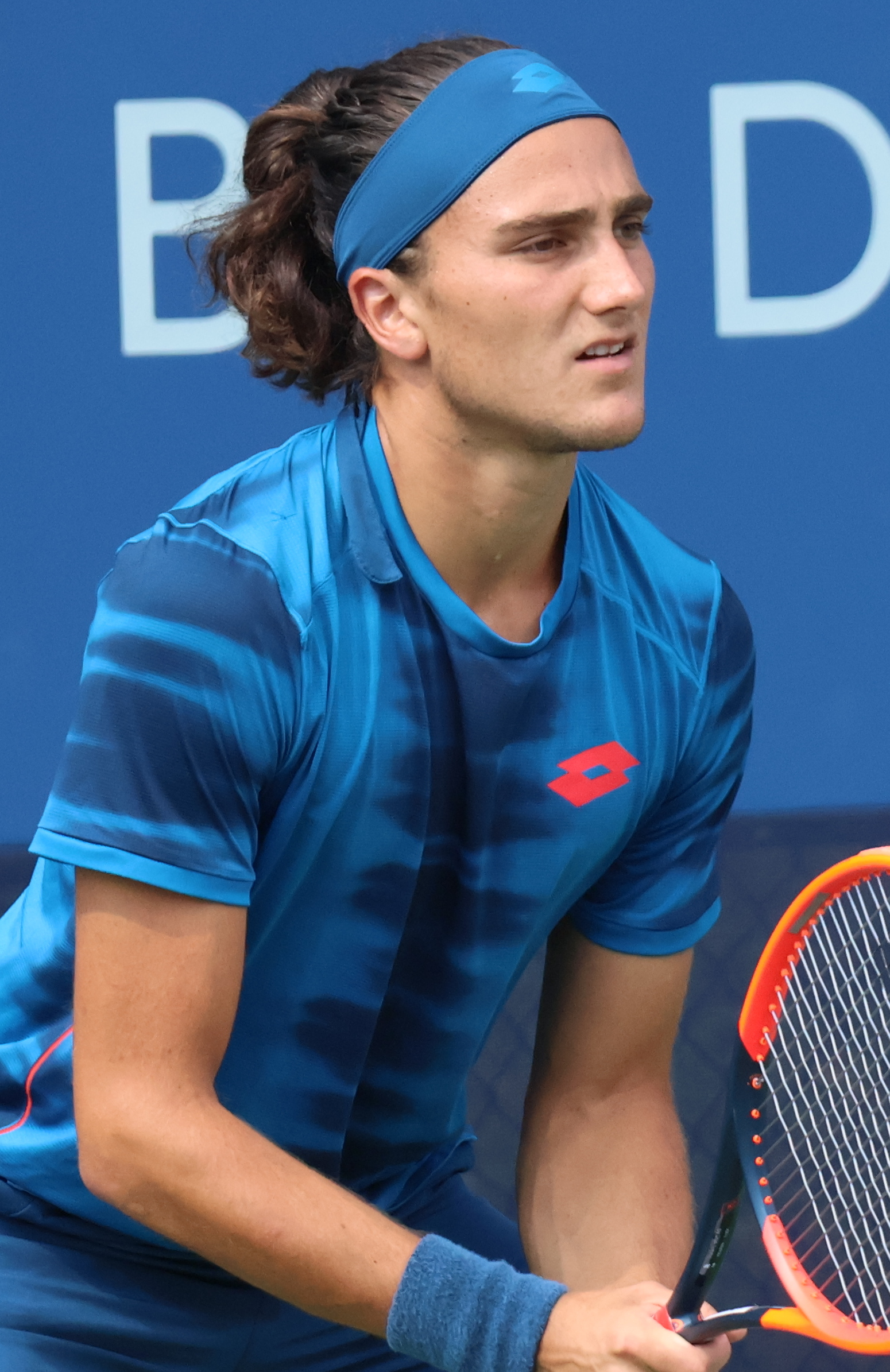
- Bellucci at the 2024 Washington Open
- Country (sports): Italy
- Residence: Milan, Italy
- Born: 1 June 2001 (age 25) Busto Arsizio, Italy
- Height: 1.75 m (5 ft 9 in)
- Turned pro: 2018
- Plays: Left-handed (two-handed backhand)
- Coach: Fabio Chiappini; Fabrizio Bellucci; Marco Brigo
- Prize money: US $3,167,553

Singles
- Career record: 31–47
- Career titles: 0
- Highest ranking: No. 62 (9 November 2026)
- Current ranking: No. 62 (9 November 2026)

Grand Slam singles results
- Australian Open: 1R (2023, 2026)
- French Open: 1R (2024, 2025, 2026)
- Wimbledon: 3R (2025)
- US Open: 2R (2024, 2025, 2026)

Doubles
- Career record: 4–8
- Career titles: 0
- Highest ranking: No. 284 (21 July 2025)
- Current ranking: No. 574 (9 November 2026)

Grand Slam doubles results
- Australian Open: 1R (2026)
- French Open: 2R (2025, 2026)
- Wimbledon: 2R (2025)
- US Open: 1R (2025)
- Last updated on: 9 November 2026.

Mattia Bellucci (born 1 June 2001) is an Italian professional tennis player. He has a career-high ATP singles ranking of world No. 62 achieved on 9 November 2026 and a doubles ranking of No. 284, reached on 21 July 2025.

== Early life and background ==
Bellucci was born on 1 June 2001 in Busto Arsizio, Italy. He was introduced to tennis by his father and first coach, Fabrizio Bellucci, at age 4.

== Career ==
=== 2022: Maiden Challenger title ===
Bellucci won two ATP Challenger singles titles at the 2022 Saint-Tropez Open and the 2022 Vilnius Open, both in October 2022. He became the second Italian NextGen ATP player to lift multiple trophies in the season (after Luca Nardi with three) and the youngest from his nation to win Challenger titles in back-to-back weeks since 19-year-old Stefano Pescosolido in 1991. As a result, he rose to a career-high world No. 156 in the singles rankings.

=== 2023–2024: Major, Masters debuts, ATP quarterfinal, top 100 ===
In January 2023, Bellucci qualified for the 2023 Australian Open to make his Grand Slam debut. As a result he made his debut in the top 150 at world No. 142 on 30 January 2023.

Bellucci won the ATP Challenger doubles title at the 2024 Tennis Challenger Hamburg with Rémy Bertola. Ranked No. 173, he made his debut at the 2024 French Open after qualifying for the main draw. Ranked No. 150, he made his debut at the 2024 Wimbledon Championships after also qualifying for the main draw.

Bellucci qualified for the main draw and reached his first ATP quarterfinal at the 2024 Atlanta Open defeating second seed Adrian Mannarino. Ranked No. 125, he also qualified for the Citi DC Open in Washington, defeating Tristan Boyer and Leandro Riedi. He recorded a first-round win in the main draw at the ATP 500 level over Mackenzie McDonald. In August, he reached the Challenger final after qualifying at the 2024 Cary Tennis Classic but lost to Roman Safiullin, missing two match points and the opportunity for a Top 100 debut.

Ranked No. 102 he also qualified on his debut for the main draw of the US Open and recorded his first Grand Slam win over wildcard Stan Wawrinka. He qualified for the main draw at the 2024 Japan Open Tennis Championships but lost in the first round to Jack Draper.

He made his debut at the 2024 Rolex Shanghai Masters after qualifying for the main draw and defeated lucky loser Billy Harris, his first win at this level, before losing to second seed Alexander Zverev.

He finished the season ranked world No. 100 on 18 November 2024.

=== 2025: First top 10 win and ATP semifinal, top 70 ===
At the 2025 ABN AMRO Open in Rotterdam, Bellucci upset second seed Daniil Medvedev, recording his first top 10 win as a qualifier, and reached his first ATP 500 quarterfinal. Next, he upset another seed, Stefanos Tsitsipas seeded sixth, to reach his first ATP Tour semifinal and also first at the 500-level. As a result, he moved to a new career-high into the top 70 in the ATP singles rankings on 10 February 2025.

== Personal life ==
Bellucci's tennis hero is Rafael Nadal. He also admires Andre Agassi's timing and John McEnroe's artistry with touch. Beyond tennis, Bellucci appreciates the Japanese culture, and has several Japanese-themed and Japanese art-inspired tattoos.

== Performance timeline ==
Key
W	F	SF	QF	#R	RR	Q#	DNQ	A	NH

(W) winner; (F) finalist; (SF) semifinalist; (QF) quarterfinalist; (#R) rounds 4, 3, 2, 1; (RR) round-robin stage; (Q#) qualification round; (DNQ) did not qualify; (A) absent; (NH) not held; (SR) strike rate (events won / competed); (W–L) win–loss record.
To avoid confusion and double counting, these charts are updated at the conclusion of a tournament or when the player's participation has ended.

=== Singles ===
Tournament	2023	2024	2025	2026	SR	W–L	Win %
Grand Slam tournaments
Australian Open	1R	Q2	Q2	1R	0 / 2	0–2	0%
French Open	Q1	1R	1R	1R	0 / 3	0–3	0%
Wimbledon	Q3	1R	3R	A	0 / 2	2–2	50%
US Open	Q1	2R	2R	2R	0 / 3	3–3	50%
Win–loss	0–1	1–3	3–3	1–3	0 / 10	5–10	33%
ATP Masters 1000
Indian Wells Open	Q1	A	Q1	1R	0 / 1	0–1	0%
Miami Open	Q1	A	1R	1R	0 / 2	0–2	0%
Monte-Carlo Masters	A	A	Q2	A	0 / 0	0–0	–
Madrid Open	A	A	1R	1R	0 / 2	0–2	0%
Italian Open	Q1	A	1R	3R	0 / 2	2–2	50%
Canadian Open	A	A	1R	1R	0 / 2	0–2	0%
Cincinnati Open	A	A	1R	1R	0 / 2	1–2	33%
Shanghai Masters	A	2R	1R	1R	0 / 3	2–3	40%
Paris Masters	A	A	Q1	2R	0 / 1	1–1	50%
Win–loss	0–0	1–1	1–6	4–8	0 / 15	6–15	29%

== ATP Challenger Tour finals ==
=== Singles: 10 (5 titles, 5 runner-ups) ===
Legend ATP Challenger Tour (5–5)	Finals by surface Hard (5–5) Clay (–)

Result	W–L	Date	Tournament	Tier	Surface	Opponent	Score
Win	1–0	Oct 2022	Saint-Tropez Open, France	Challenger	Hard	(Italy) Matteo Arnaldi	6–3, 6–3
Win	2–0	Oct 2022	Vilnius Open, Lithuania	Challenger	Hard (i)	(Turkey) Cem İlkel	1–6, 6–3, 7–5
Win	3–0	Sep 2023	Cassis Open, France	Challenger	Hard	(Czech Republic) Tomáš Macháč	6–3, 6–4
Loss	3–1	Oct 2023	Málaga Open, Spain	Challenger	Hard	(France) Ugo Blanchet	4–6, 4–6
Loss	3–2	Aug 2024	Cary Tennis Classic, US	Challenger	Hard	Roman Safiullin	6–1, 5–7, 5–7
Loss	3–3	Oct 2024	Olbia Challenger, Italy	Challenger	Hard	(Spain) Martín Landaluce	4–6, 4–6
Win	4–3	Aug 2025	Serve First Open, US	Challenger	Hard	(Kazakhstan) Alexander Shevchenko	7–6^{(7–5)}, 3–1 ret.
Loss	4–4	Mar 2026	Copa Cap Cana, Dominican Republic	Challenger	Hard	(Argentina) Mariano Navone	5–7, 4–6
Loss	4–5	Sep 2026	Jingshan Tennis Open, China	Challenger	Hard	(South Africa) Lloyd Harris	6–1, 3–6, 6–7^{(4–7)}
Win	5–5	Oct 2025	Jinan Open, China	Challenger	Hard	(Spain) Martín Landaluce	6–2, 4–6, 6–3

=== Doubles: 1 (title) ===
Legend ATP Challenger Tour (1–0)

Result	W–L	Date	Tournament	Tier	Surface	Partner	Opponents	Score
Win	1–0	Mar 2024	Challenger Hamburg, Germany	Challenger	Hard (i)	(Switzerland) Rémy Bertola	(Poland) Karol Drzewiecki (Finland) Patrik Niklas-Salminen	6–4, 7–5

== ITF World Tennis Tour finals ==
=== Singles: 9 (6 titles, 3 runner-ups) ===
Legend ITF WTT (6–3)	Finals by surface Hard (5–2) Clay (1–1)

Result	W–L	Date	Tournament	Tier	Surface	Opponent	Score
Loss	0–1	Apr 2021	M15 Sharm El Sheikh, Egypt	WTT	Hard	(Cyprus) Petros Chrysochos	0–6, 2–6
Win	1–1	Aug 2021	M15 Monastir, Tunisia	WTT	Hard	(Italy) Luca Potenza	6–3, 6–3
Win	2–1	Jan 2022	M15 Monastir, Tunisia	WTT	Hard	(Italy) Francesco Passaro	6–4, 7–5
Win	3–1	Mar 2022	M15 Poitiers, France	WTT	Hard	(France) Pierre Delage	6–3, 6–7^{(6–8)}, 7–6^{(7–5)}
Win	4–1	Apr 2022	M15 Monastir, Tunisia	WTT	Hard	(Austria) Maximilian Neuchrist	7–6^{(7–4)}, 6–3
Loss	4–2	Apr 2022	M15 Monastir, Tunisia	WTT	Hard	(China) Bu Yunchaokete	4–6, 2–6
Win	5–2	May 2022	M15 Monastir, Tunisia	WTT	Hard	(United States) Omni Kumar	6–1, 6–4
Loss	5–3	Jun 2022	M25 Grasse, France	WTT	Clay	(Spain) Pol Martín Tiffon	6–7^{(5–7)}, 7–6^{(8–6)}, 5–7
Win	6–3	Jun 2022	M25 Klosters, Switzerland	WTT	Clay	(Austria) Lukas Neumayer	6–3, 6–2

=== Doubles: 5 (4 titles, 1 runner-up) ===
Legend ITF WTT (4–1)	Finals by surface Hard (4–0) Clay (0–1)

Result	W–L	Date	Tournament	Tier	Surface	Partner	Opponents	Score
Win	1–0	Sep 2021	M15 Monastir, Tunisia	WTT	Hard	(New Zealand) Ajeet Rai	(Brazil) Gabriel Décamps (Germany) Robert Strombachs	7–6^{(7–1)}, 6–7^{(5–7)}, [10–4]
Win	2–0	Oct 2021	M15 Selva, Italy	WTT	Hard	(Italy) Luca Potenza	(Italy) Marco Brugnerotto (Italy) Luigi Sorrentino	6–3, 7–6^{(9–7)}
Win	3–0	Feb 2022	M15 Sharm El Sheikh, Egypt	WTT	Hard	(Italy) Federico Iannaccone	(Italy) Marco Miceli (Italy) Matteo Gigante	6–2, 6–2
Win	4–0	May 2022	M15 Monastir, Tunisia	WTT	Hard	(Italy) Federico Iannaccone	(Estonia) Karl Kiur Saar (Estonia) Daniil Glinka	6–2, 6–4
Loss	4–1	Jun 2022	M25 Kiseljak, Bosnia and Herzegovina	WTT	Clay	(Switzerland) Rémy Bertola	(Australia) Matthew Romios (Australia) Brandon Walkin	6–3, 4–6, [6–10]

== Wins over top 10 players ==
- Bellucci has a 1–1 record against players who were, at the time the match was played, ranked in the top 10.

Season	2025	Total
Wins	1	1

#	Player	Rk	Event	Surface	Rd	Score	Rk
2025
1.	Daniil Medvedev	7	Rotterdam Open, Netherlands	Hard (i)	2R	6–3, 6–7^{(6–8)}, 6–3	92

*As of 5 February 2025
