= 2023 Málaga Open – Singles =

Singles
- 2023 Málaga Open

Final
- Champion: (France) Ugo Blanchet
- Runner-up: (Italy) Mattia Bellucci
- Score: 6–4, 6–4

Events
| Singles | Doubles |
| ← 2022 · | Málaga Open | · 2024 → |

Constant Lestienne was the defending champion but lost in the second round to Ugo Blanchet.

Blanchet won the title after defeating Mattia Bellucci 6–4, 6–4 in the final.

== Seeds ==
1. (Spain) Roberto Bautista Agut (second round)
2. (Spain) Roberto Carballés Baena (first round)
3. (Spain) Bernabé Zapata Miralles (first round, retired)
4. (Colombia) Daniel Elahi Galán (second round)
5. (Spain) Albert Ramos Viñolas (second round)
6. (France) Constant Lestienne (second round)
7. (Argentina) Thiago Agustín Tirante (second round)
8. (Spain) Pedro Martínez (second round)

== Draw ==
=== Key ===
- Q = Qualifier
- WC = Wild card
- LL = Lucky loser
- Alt = Alternate
- SE = Special exempt
- PR = Protected ranking
- ITF = ITF entry
- JE = Junior exempt
- w/o = Walkover
- r = Retired
- d = Defaulted
- SR = Special ranking

=== Finals ===
Semifinals
Q | (France) Maxime Janvier | 1 | 6^{4}
Q | (France) Ugo Blanchet | 6 | 7^{7}
(United States) Emilio Nava | 6^{4} | 4
(Italy) Mattia Bellucci | 7^{7} | 6

Final
Q | (France) Ugo Blanchet | 6 | 6
(Italy) Mattia Bellucci | 4 | 4

=== Top half ===
First round
1/WC | (Spain) R Bautista Agut | 6 | 6
WC | (Belgium) G-A Bailly | 4 | 3
I Gakhov | 3 | 4
Q | (United Kingdom) B Harris | 6 | 6
Q | (France) M Janvier | 6 | 3 | 6
(Germany) M Marterer | 2 | 6 | 3
I Ivashka | 3 | 2
7 | (Argentina) TA Tirante | 6 | 6
3 | (Spain) B Zapata Miralles | 2 | 0^{r}
(Italy) F Cobolli | 6 | 0
(Bulgaria) D Kuzmanov | 6 | 2 | 7^{7}
(France) C Moutet | 2 | 6 | 6^{5}
(India) S Nagal | 1 | 0^{r}
Q | (France) U Blanchet | 6 | 3
Q | (Switzerland) A Bellier | 4 | 4
6 | (France) C Lestienne | 6 | 6

Second round
1/WC | (Spain) R Bautista Agut | 5 | 4
Q | (United Kingdom) B Harris | 7 | 6
Q | (France) M Janvier | 6^{3} | 6 | 7^{7}
7 | (Argentina) TA Tirante | 7^{7} | 3 | 6^{3}
(Italy) F Cobolli | 7 | 6
(Bulgaria) D Kuzmanov | 5 | 4
Q | (France) U Blanchet | 6 | 6
6 | (France) C Lestienne | 1 | 4

Quarterfinals
Q | (United Kingdom) B Harris | 6^{5} | 3
Q | (France) M Janvier | 7^{7} | 6
(Italy) F Cobolli | 3 | 1
Q | (France) U Blanchet | 6 | 6

Semifinals
Q | (France) M Janvier | 1 | 6^{4}
Q | (France) U Blanchet | 6 | 7^{7}

=== Bottom half ===
First round
5 | (Spain) A Ramos Viñolas | 4 | 6 | 7
Alt | (Bulgaria) A Andreev | 6 | 0 | 5
(United States) Em Nava | 6 | 6
Q | (Italy) R Brancaccio | 4 | 4
Q | (Spain) A Moro Cañas | 6 | 7^{7}
(Sweden) E Ymer | 1 | 6^{3}
SE | (France) H Grenier | 3 | 5
4 | (Colombia) DE Galán | 6 | 7
8 | (Spain) P Martínez | 6 | 4
(France) B Paire | 0 | 2^{r}
(Spain) P Llamas Ruiz | 6^{4} | 1
(Italy) A Vavassori | 7^{7} | 6
WC | (Spain) P Carreño Busta | 2 | 6 | 6
(France) A Cazaux | 6 | 4 | 3
(Italy) M Bellucci | 4 | 6 | 6
2 | (Spain) R Carballés Baena | 6 | 3 | 2

Second round
5 | (Spain) A Ramos Viñolas | 3 | 6^{4}
(United States) Em Nava | 6 | 7^{7}
Q | (Spain) A Moro Cañas | 6 | 6
4 | (Colombia) DE Galán | 3 | 4
8 | (Spain) P Martínez | 6^{7} | 7^{7} | 2
(Italy) A Vavassori | 7^{9} | 6^{2} | 6
WC | (Spain) P Carreño Busta | 3 | 6^{0}
(Italy) M Bellucci | 6 | 7^{7}

Quarterfinals
(United States) Em Nava | 2 | 6 | 7
Q | (Spain) A Moro Cañas | 6 | 3 | 5
(Italy) A Vavassori | 3 | 5
(Italy) M Bellucci | 6 | 7

Semifinals
(United States) Em Nava | 6^{4} | 4
(Italy) M Bellucci | 7^{7} | 6
