= 2026 Glasgow Challenger – Doubles =

Doubles
- 2026 Glasgow Challenger

Final
- Champions: (Germany) Christoph Negritu (Colombia) Adrià Soriano Barrera
- Runners-up: (United Kingdom) Charles Broom (United Kingdom) Ben Jones
- Score: 2–6, 6–2, [10–4]

Events
Singles	Doubles
- Glasgow Challenger

Daniel Cukierman and Joshua Paris were the defending champions but chose not to defend their title.

Christoph Negritu and Adrià Soriano Barrera won the title after defeating Charles Broom and Ben Jones 2–6, 6–2, [10–4] in the final.

== Seeds ==
1. (Canada) Cleeve Harper / (United Kingdom) David Stevenson (semifinals)
2. (Romania) Victor Vlad Cornea / (Croatia) Nino Serdarušić (quarterfinals)
3. (Poland) Szymon Kielan / (Poland) Filip Pieczonka (first round)
4. (United States) Trey Hilderbrand / (Poland) Szymon Walków (first round)

== Draw ==
Key

- Q = Qualifier
- WC = Wild card
- LL = Lucky loser
- Alt = Alternate
- ITF = ITF entry
- PR = Protected ranking
- SR = Special ranking
- SE = Special exempt
- JE = Junior exempt
- JR = Junior Accelerator Programme entrant
- CO = College Accelerator Programme entrant
- NG = Next Gen Accelerator Program entrant
- w/o = Walkover
- r = Retired
- d = Defaulted

First round
1	(Canada) C Harper (United Kingdom) D Stevenson	7	6
WC	(United Kingdom) T Hands (United Kingdom) H Wendelken	5	3
(Bulgaria) A Genov (Czech Republic) J Jermář	3	6	[10]
(Czech Republic) H Bartoň (Czech Republic) M Vrbenský	6	4	[4]
3	(Poland) S Kielan (Poland) F Pieczonka	4	6	[6]
(Germany) C Negritu (Colombia) A Soriano Barrera	6	4	[10]
(Serbia) I Sabanov (Serbia) M Sabanov	5	2
(France) C Chidekh (United Kingdom) M Whitehouse	7	6
(United Kingdom) S Duncan (United Kingdom) J MacKinlay	6	6^{4}	[10]
(Slovakia) M Karol (Germany) D Masur	3	7^{7}	[7]
(United Kingdom) C Broom (United Kingdom) B Jones	6	6
4	(United States) T Hilderbrand (Poland) S Walków	4	2
(United States) A Fenty (United States) J Sheehy	7^{7}	6
WC	(United Kingdom) F Bass (United Kingdom) L Maxted	6^{4}	4
(Lithuania) E Butvilas (Portugal) T Pereira	1	6^{5}
2	(Romania) V Cornea (Croatia) N Serdarušić	6	7^{7}

Quarterfinals
1	(Canada) C Harper (United Kingdom) D Stevenson	6	6
(Bulgaria) A Genov (Czech Republic) J Jermář	3	4
(Germany) C Negritu (Colombia) A Soriano Barrera	4	6	[12]
(France) C Chidekh (United Kingdom) M Whitehouse	6	1	[10]
(United Kingdom) S Duncan (United Kingdom) J MacKinlay	4	7^{7}	[6]
(United Kingdom) C Broom (United Kingdom) B Jones	6	6^{4}	[10]
(United States) A Fenty (United States) J Sheehy	6	7^{7}
2	(Romania) V Cornea (Croatia) N Serdarušić	4	6^{1}

Semifinals
1	(Canada) C Harper (United Kingdom) D Stevenson	6^{6}	7^{7}	[8]
(Germany) C Negritu (Colombia) A Soriano Barrera	7^{8}	6^{5}	[10]
(United Kingdom) C Broom (United Kingdom) B Jones	4	6	[10]
(United States) A Fenty (United States) J Sheehy	6	3	[7]

Final
(Germany) C Negritu (Colombia) A Soriano Barrera	2	6	[10]
(United Kingdom) C Broom (United Kingdom) B Jones	6	2	[4]
