= 2023 Málaga Open – Doubles =

Doubles
- 2023 Málaga Open

Final
- Champions: (United Kingdom) Julian Cash (United States) Robert Galloway
- Runners-up: (Australia) Andrew Harris (Australia) John-Patrick Smith
- Score: 7–5, 6–2

Events
Singles	Doubles
← 2022 ·	Málaga Open	· 2024 →

Altuğ Çelikbilek and Dmitry Popko were the defending champions but chose not to defend their title.

Julian Cash and Robert Galloway won the title after defeating Andrew Harris and John-Patrick Smith 7–5, 6–2 in the final.

== Seeds ==
1. (Portugal) Francisco Cabral / (United Kingdom) Henry Patten (quarterfinals)
2. (United Kingdom) Julian Cash / (United States) Robert Galloway (champions)
3. (Colombia) Nicolás Barrientos / (Romania) Victor Vlad Cornea (first round)
4. (Mexico) Miguel Ángel Reyes-Varela / (Spain) David Vega Hernández (quarterfinals)

== Draw ==
=== Key ===
- Q = Qualifier
- WC = Wild card
- LL = Lucky loser
- Alt = Alternate
- ITF = ITF entry
- PR = Protected ranking
- SR = Special ranking
- SE = Special exempt
- JE = Junior exempt
- JR = Junior Accelerator Programme entrant
- CO = College Accelerator Programme entrant
- NG = Next Gen Accelerator Program entrant
- w/o = Walkover
- r = Retired
- d = Defaulted

First round
1	(Portugal) F Cabral (United Kingdom) H Patten	7^{7}	3	[10]
(India) RC Bollipalli (India) A Kadhe	6^{5}	6	[8]
(Australia) A Harris (Australia) J-P Smith	6	6
WC	(Spain) D Marrero (United States) Dhruva Mulye	1	3
3	(Colombia) N Barrientos (Romania) VV Cornea	7	5	[6]
(Italy) M Bortolotti (Spain) S Martos Gornés	5	7	[10]
(Pakistan) A-u-H Qureshi (India) D Sharan	4	4
(Belgium) M Geerts (Austria) M Neuchrist	6	6
(Spain) A Barroso Campos (Spain) P Llamas Ruiz	7^{7}	3	[6]
(Italy) M Bellucci (Tunisia) M Echargui	6^{5}	6	[10]
(India) A Chandrasekar (India) VS Prashanth	7^{7}	4	[6]
4	(Mexico) MÁ Reyes-Varela (Spain) D Vega Hernández	6^{2}	6	[10]
WC	(Spain) John Echeverría (Colombia) A Soriano Barrera	4	6^{2}
(Spain) Í Cervantes (India) J Nedunchezhiyan	6	7^{7}
(Serbia) I Sabanov (Serbia) M Sabanov	7	3	[6]
2	(United Kingdom) J Cash (United States) R Galloway	5	6	[10]

Quarterfinals
1	(Portugal) F Cabral (United Kingdom) H Patten	6	4	[8]
(Australia) A Harris (Australia) J-P Smith	1	6	[10]
(Italy) M Bortolotti (Spain) S Martos Gornés	7^{7}	6^{5}	[10]
(Belgium) M Geerts (Austria) M Neuchrist	6^{3}	7^{7}	[7]
(Italy) M Bellucci (Tunisia) M Echargui	2	7^{7}	[10]
4	(Mexico) MÁ Reyes-Varela (Spain) D Vega Hernández	6	6^{5}	[5]
(Spain) Í Cervantes (India) J Nedunchezhiyan	6	5	[9]
2	(United Kingdom) J Cash (United States) R Galloway	4	7	[11]

Semifinals
(Australia) A Harris (Australia) J-P Smith	6	6
(Italy) M Bortolotti (Spain) S Martos Gornés	4	4
(Italy) M Bellucci (Tunisia) M Echargui	1	2
2	(United Kingdom) J Cash (United States) R Galloway	6	6

Final
(Australia) A Harris (Australia) J-P Smith	5	2
2	(United Kingdom) J Cash (United States) R Galloway	7	6
