= 2025 Glasgow Challenger =

- Date: 17–23 February
- Edition: 2nd
- Surface: Hard (indoor)
- Location: Glasgow, United Kingdom

Champions

Singles
- (Norway) Nicolai Budkov Kjær

Doubles
- (Israel) Daniel Cukierman / (United Kingdom) Joshua Paris
- Glasgow Challenger

The 2025 Lexus Glasgow Challenger was a professional tennis tournament played on indoor hardcourts. It was the second edition of the tournament which was part of the 2025 ATP Challenger Tour. It took place in Glasgow, United Kingdom between 17 and 23 February 2025.

== Singles main-draw entrants ==
=== Seeds ===
Country	Player	Rank^{1}	Seed
FRA	Constant Lestienne	161	1
HKG	Coleman Wong	167	2
GBR	Dan Evans	174	3
CAN	Liam Draxl	187	4
FRA	Clément Chidekh	189	5
FRA	Hugo Grenier	202	6
BEL	Gauthier Onclin	216	7
POL	Maks Kaśnikowski	217	8

- ^{1} Rankings are as of 10 February 2025.

=== Other entrants ===
The following players received wildcards into the singles main draw:

- (United Kingdom) Dan Evans
- (United Kingdom) Johannus Monday
- (United Kingdom) Henry Searle

The following players received entry into the singles main draw as alternates:

- (Norway) Viktor Durasovic
- (South Africa) Philip Henning

The following players received entry from the qualifying draw:

- (Italy) Raúl Brancaccio
- (United States) ~~Micah Braswell~~
- (Germany) Christoph Negritu
- (United Kingdom) Stuart Parker
- (United Kingdom) James Story
- (United Kingdom) Harry Wendelken

The following player received entry as a lucky loser:

- (United Kingdom) Giles Hussey

== Champions ==
=== Singles ===
- (Norway) Nicolai Budkov Kjær def. (Norway) Viktor Durasovic 6–4, 6–3.

=== Doubles ===
- (Israel) Daniel Cukierman / (United Kingdom) Joshua Paris def. (United States) Vasil Kirkov / (United Kingdom) Marcus Willis 5–7, 6–4, [12–10].
