= 2025 Glasgow Challenger – Doubles =

Doubles
- 2025 Glasgow Challenger

Final
- Champions: (Israel) Daniel Cukierman (United Kingdom) Joshua Paris
- Runners-up: (United States) Vasil Kirkov (United Kingdom) Marcus Willis
- Score: 5–7, 6–4, [12–10]

Events
Singles	Doubles
- Glasgow Challenger

Scott Duncan and Marcus Willis were the defending champions but chose to defend their title with different partners. Duncan partnered Tim Rühl but lost in the first round to Miloš Karol and Szymon Walków. Willis partnered Vasil Kirkov but lost in the final to Daniel Cukierman and Joshua Paris.

Cukierman and Paris won the title after defeating Kirkov and Willis 5–7, 6–4, [12–10] in the final.

== Seeds ==
1. (United States) Vasil Kirkov / (United Kingdom) Marcus Willis (final)
2. (Israel) Daniel Cukierman / (United Kingdom) Joshua Paris (champions)
3. (Spain) Íñigo Cervantes / (Spain) Daniel Rincón (first round)
4. (Slovakia) Miloš Karol / (Poland) Szymon Walków (semifinals)

== Draw ==
Key

- Q = Qualifier
- WC = Wild card
- LL = Lucky loser
- Alt = Alternate
- ITF = ITF entry
- PR = Protected ranking
- SR = Special ranking
- SE = Special exempt
- JE = Junior exempt
- JR = Junior Accelerator Programme entrant
- CO = College Accelerator Programme entrant
- NG = Next Gen Accelerator Program entrant
- w/o = Walkover
- r = Retired
- d = Defaulted

=== Draw ===
First round
1	(United States) V Kirkov (United Kingdom) M Willis	6	7^{7}
(Netherlands) T Loof (Italy) Augusto Virgili	0	6^{3}
(Bulgaria) A Genov (Poland) S Kielan	4	2
(Sweden) E Grevelius (Sweden) A Heinonen	6	6
4	(Slovakia) M Karol (Poland) S Walków	6	4	[10]
(United Kingdom) S Duncan (Germany) T Rühl	1	6	[3]
(France) C Chidekh (Germany) D Masur	5	6	[10]
WC	(United Kingdom) F Bass (United Kingdom) J MacKinlay	7	0	[5]
(Peru) A Merino (Germany) C Negritu	2	5
(France) H Grenier (France) L Sanchez	6	7
WC	(United Kingdom) T Hands (United Kingdom) H Wendelken	6	2	[10]
3	(Spain) Í Cervantes (Spain) D Rincón	3	6	[7]
(Germany) R Molleker (Kazakhstan) D Yevseyev	7	6
PR	(Romania) B Pavel (India) D Sharan	5	2
(United States) M Kiger (New Zealand) F Reynolds	4	4
2	(Israel) D Cukierman (United Kingdom) J Paris	6	6

Quarterfinals
1	(United States) V Kirkov (United Kingdom) M Willis	6	7^{8}
(Sweden) E Grevelius (Sweden) A Heinonen	2	6^{6}
4	(Slovakia) M Karol (Poland) S Walków	6	4	[10]
(France) C Chidekh (Germany) D Masur	3	6	[4]
(France) H Grenier (France) L Sanchez	6	6
WC	(United Kingdom) T Hands (United Kingdom) H Wendelken	4	4
(Germany) R Molleker (Kazakhstan) D Yevseyev
2	(Israel) D Cukierman (United Kingdom) J Paris	w/o

Semifinals
1	(United States) V Kirkov (United Kingdom) M Willis	6	6
4	(Slovakia) M Karol (Poland) S Walków	1	3
(France) H Grenier (France) L Sanchez	7	1	[7]
2	(Israel) D Cukierman (United Kingdom) J Paris	5	6	[10]

Final
1	(United States) V Kirkov (United Kingdom) M Willis	7	4	[10]
2	(Israel) D Cukierman (United Kingdom) J Paris	5	6	[12]
