= 2026 Glasgow Challenger =

- Date: 12–17 January
- Edition: 3rd
- Surface: Hard (indoor)
- Location: Glasgow, United Kingdom

Champions

Singles
- (France) Clément Chidekh

Doubles
- (Germany) Christoph Negritu / (Colombia) Adrià Soriano Barrera
- Glasgow Challenger

The 2026 Lexus Glasgow Challenger was a professional tennis tournament played on indoor hardcourts. It was the third edition of the tournament which was part of the 2026 ATP Challenger Tour. It took place in Glasgow, United Kingdom between 12 and 17 January 2026.

== Singles main-draw entrants ==
=== Seeds ===
Country	Player	Rank^{1}	Seed
GBR	Johannus Monday	233	1
FRA	Clément Chidekh	252	2
SUI	Rémy Bertola	255	3
BUL	Dimitar Kuzmanov	262	4
POR	Frederico Ferreira Silva	263	5
POR	Tiago Pereira	265	6
LTU	Edas Butvilas	272	7
GER	Henri Squire	276	8

- ^{1} Rankings are as of 5 January 2026.

=== Other entrants ===
The following players received wildcards into the singles main draw:

- (United Kingdom) Alastair Gray
- (United Kingdom) Paul Jubb
- (United Kingdom) Lui Maxted

The following players received entry from the qualifying draw:

- (Slovakia) Miloš Karol
- (Czech Republic) Martin Krumich
- (Germany) Daniel Masur
- (Germany) Marvin Möller
- (Denmark) Carl Emil Overbeck
- (United Kingdom) Henry Searle

The following player received entry as a lucky loser:

- (Kazakhstan) Denis Yevseyev

== Champions ==
=== Singles ===
- (France) Clément Chidekh def. (Kazakhstan) Mikhail Kukushkin 5–7, 6–1, 4–0 ret.

=== Doubles ===
- (Germany) Christoph Negritu / (Colombia) Adrià Soriano Barrera def. (United Kingdom) Charles Broom / (United Kingdom) Ben Jones 2–6, 6–2, [10–4].
