= 2022 Málaga Open =

- Date: 27 June – 3 July
- Edition: 1st
- Surface: Hard
- Location: Málaga, Spain

Champions

Singles
- (France) Constant Lestienne

Doubles
- (Turkey) Altuğ Çelikbilek / (Kazakhstan) Dmitry Popko
Málaga Open	· 2023 →

The 2022 Málaga Open was a professional tennis tournament played on hard courts. It was the first edition of the tournament which was part of the 2022 ATP Challenger Tour. It took place in Málaga, Spain between 27 June and 3 July 2022.

== Singles main draw entrants ==
=== Seeds ===
Country	Player	Rank^{1}	Seed
AUS	Christopher O'Connell	109	1
CAN	Vasek Pospisil	125	2
USA	Ernesto Escobedo	133	3
FRA	Constant Lestienne	151	4
ECU	Emilio Gómez	153	5
TUR	Altuğ Çelikbilek	178	6
USA	Michael Mmoh	182	7
TPE	Wu Tung-lin	194	8

- ^{1} Rankings as of 20 June 2022.

=== Other entrants ===
The following players received wildcards into the singles main draw:

- (Spain) Alberto Barroso Campos
- (Spain) Daniel Mérida
- (Australia) Bernard Tomic

The following player received entry into the singles main draw using a protected ranking:

- (Italy) Roberto Marcora

The following players received entry into the singles main draw as alternates:

- (Spain) Nicolás Álvarez Varona
- (Canada) Steven Diez
- (Japan) Kaichi Uchida

The following players received entry from the qualifying draw:

- (India) Yuki Bhambri
- (Israel) Daniel Cukierman
- (Brazil) Gabriel Décamps
- (Czech Republic) Marek Gengel
- Alibek Kachmazov
- (Australia) James McCabe

== Champions ==
=== Singles ===
- (France) Constant Lestienne def. (Ecuador) Emilio Gómez 6–3, 5–7, 6–2.

=== Doubles ===
- (Turkey) Altuğ Çelikbilek / (Kazakhstan) Dmitry Popko def. (Israel) Daniel Cukierman / (Ecuador) Emilio Gómez 6–7^{(4–7)}, 6–4, [10–6].
