= 2023 Rafa Nadal Open =

- Date: 29 August – 3 September
- Edition: 5th
- Surface: Hard
- Location: Manacor, Spain

Champions

Singles
- (Serbia) Hamad Medjedovic

Doubles
- (Israel) Daniel Cukierman / (United Kingdom) Joshua Paris
- Rafa Nadal Open

The 2023 Rafa Nadal Open was a professional tennis tournament played on hard courts. It was the fifth edition of the tournament which was part of the 2023 ATP Challenger Tour. It took place in Manacor, Spain between 29 August and 3 September 2023.

== Singles main-draw entrants ==
=== Seeds ===
Country	Player	Rank^{1}	Seed
CHI	Tomás Barrios Vera	120	1
SRB	Hamad Medjedovic	145	2
FRA	Antoine Escoffier	157	3
SWE	Elias Ymer	171	4
ITA	Mattia Bellucci	184	5
SUI	Alexander Ritschard	185	6
FRA	Harold Mayot	211	7
ITA	Federico Gaio	216	8

- ^{1} Rankings are as of 21 August 2023.

=== Other entrants ===
The following players received wildcards into the singles main draw:

- Yaroslav Demin
- (Spain) Martín Landaluce
- (Hong Kong) Coleman Wong

The following players received entry into the singles main draw as alternates:

- (Portugal) Frederico Ferreira Silva
- (Dominican Republic) Nick Hardt
- (North Macedonia) Kalin Ivanovski
- (Estonia) Mark Lajal
- (France) Jules Marie
- (Colombia) Nicolás Mejía
- (Spain) Alejandro Moro Cañas
- (Austria) Maximilian Neuchrist
- (Spain) Daniel Rincón
- (Jordan) Abdullah Shelbayh
- (Portugal) João Sousa
- (Argentina) Marco Trungelliti

The following players received entry from the qualifying draw:

- (Israel) Daniel Cukierman
- (Bosnia and Herzegovina) Damir Džumhur
- (Portugal) Gastão Elias
- (Germany) Peter Gojowczyk
- (France) Maxime Janvier
- (Colombia) Adrià Soriano Barrera

== Champions ==
=== Singles ===
- (Serbia) Hamad Medjedovic def. (France) Harold Mayot 6–2, 4–6, 6–2.

=== Doubles ===
- (Israel) Daniel Cukierman / (United Kingdom) Joshua Paris def. (India) Sriram Balaji / (India) Ramkumar Ramanathan 6–4, 6–4.
