= 2024 Glasgow Challenger =

- Date: 12–18 February
- Edition: 1st
- Surface: Hard (indoor)
- Location: Glasgow, United Kingdom

Champions

Singles
- (France) Clément Chidekh

Doubles
- (United Kingdom) Scott Duncan / (United Kingdom) Marcus Willis
- Glasgow Challenger

The 2024 Lexus Glasgow Challenger was a professional tennis tournament played on indoor hardcourts. It was the first edition of the tournament which was part of the 2024 ATP Challenger Tour. It took place in Glasgow, United Kingdom between 12 and 18 February 2024.

== Singles main-draw entrants ==
=== Seeds ===
Country	Player	Rank^{1}	Seed
FRA	Calvin Hemery	221	1
BUL	Dimitar Kuzmanov	225	2
ITA	Francesco Maestrelli	236	3
FRA	Manuel Guinard	274	4
CZE	Jiří Veselý	283	5
CAN	Steven Diez	318	6
ESP	David Jordà Sanchis	326	7
GBR	Charles Broom	337	8

- ^{1} Rankings are as of 5 February 2024.

=== Other entrants ===
The following players received wildcards into the singles main draw:

- (United Kingdom) Kyle Edmund
- (United Kingdom) Henry Searle
- (United Kingdom) Hamish Stewart

The following player received entry into the singles main draw using a protected ranking:

- (Switzerland) Jérôme Kym

The following players received entry from the qualifying draw:

- (United Kingdom) Daniel Cox
- (United Kingdom) Paul Jubb
- (Germany) Nicola Kuhn
- (United Kingdom) Stuart Parker
- (Poland) Filip Peliwo
- (United Kingdom) Charlie Robertson

== Champions ==
=== Singles ===
- (France) Clément Chidekh def. (United Kingdom) Paul Jubb 0–6, 6–4, 6–1.

=== Doubles ===
- (United Kingdom) Scott Duncan / (United Kingdom) Marcus Willis def. (United Kingdom) Kyle Edmund / (United Kingdom) Henry Searle 6–3, 6–2.
