= 2023 Rafa Nadal Open – Doubles =

Doubles
- 2023 Rafa Nadal Open

Final
- Champions: (Israel) Daniel Cukierman (United Kingdom) Joshua Paris
- Runners-up: (India) Sriram Balaji (India) Ramkumar Ramanathan
- Score: 6–4, 6–4

Events
Singles	Doubles
- Rafa Nadal Open

Yuki Bhambri and Saketh Myneni were the defending champions but chose not to defend their title.

Daniel Cukierman and Joshua Paris won the title after defeating Sriram Balaji and Ramkumar Ramanathan 6–4, 6–4 in the final.

== Seeds ==
1. (France) Théo Arribagé / (France) Luca Sanchez (semifinals)
2. (France) Jonathan Eysseric / (Finland) Patrik Niklas-Salminen (quarterfinals)
3. (Netherlands) Sander Arends / (New Zealand) Artem Sitak (semifinals)
4. (India) Sriram Balaji / (India) Ramkumar Ramanathan (final)

== Draw ==
Key

- Q = Qualifier
- WC = Wild card
- LL = Lucky loser
- Alt = Alternate
- ITF = ITF entry
- PR = Protected ranking
- SR = Special ranking
- SE = Special exempt
- JE = Junior exempt
- JR = Junior Accelerator Programme entrant
- CO = College Accelerator Programme entrant
- NG = Next Gen Accelerator Program entrant
- w/o = Walkover
- r = Retired
- d = Defaulted

First round
1	(France) T Arribagé (France) L Sanchez	6	6^{5}	[10]
(Dominican Republic) N Hardt (Australia) A Taylor	3	7^{7}	[4]
(United States) A Lawson (Finland) E Vasa	7^{9}	7^{7}
(United Kingdom) C Broom (United Kingdom) M Whitehouse	6^{7}	6^{3}
4	(India) S Balaji (India) R Ramanathan	6	6
(France) L Lokoli (Switzerland) A Ritschard	2	2
(Chile) T Barrios Vera (Colombia) N Mejía	6	7^{7}
(Spain) Í Cervantes (Spain) S Martos Gornés	3	6^{4}
WC	(Germany) Rafael Giotis; Daniil Sarksian	3	4
(India) N Kaliyanda Poonacha (India) D Sharan	6	6
WC	(Spain) M Landaluce (Hong Kong) C Wong	4	5
3	(Netherlands) S Arends (New Zealand) A Sitak	6	7
(Spain) D Rincón (Jordan) A Shelbayh	2	5
(Israel) D Cukierman (United Kingdom) J Paris	6	7
(United Kingdom) J Monday (Poland) S Walków	3	7^{8}	[9]
2	(France) J Eysseric (Finland) P Niklas-Salminen	6	6^{6}	[11]

Quarterfinals
1	(France) T Arribagé (France) L Sanchez	7^{7}	4	[10]
(United States) A Lawson (Finland) E Vasa	6^{4}	6	[4]
4	(India) S Balaji (India) R Ramanathan	6	7
(Chile) T Barrios Vera (Colombia) N Mejía	2	5
(India) N Kaliyanda Poonacha (India) D Sharan	2	4
3	(Netherlands) S Arends (New Zealand) A Sitak	6	6
(Israel) D Cukierman (United Kingdom) J Paris	6	6
2	(France) J Eysseric (Finland) P Niklas-Salminen	4	4

Semifinals
1	(France) T Arribagé (France) L Sanchez	4	4
4	(India) S Balaji (India) R Ramanathan	6	6
3	(Netherlands) S Arends (New Zealand) A Sitak	3	2
(Israel) D Cukierman (United Kingdom) J Paris	6	6

Final
4	(India) S Balaji (India) R Ramanathan	4	4
(Israel) D Cukierman (United Kingdom) J Paris	6	6
