= 2022 Málaga Open – Singles =

Singles
- 2022 Málaga Open

Final
- Champion: (France) Constant Lestienne
- Runner-up: (Ecuador) Emilio Gómez
- Score: 6–3, 5–7, 6–2

Events
Singles	Doubles
- Málaga Open

This was the first edition of the tournament.

Constant Lestienne won the title after defeating Emilio Gómez 6–3, 5–7, 6–2 in the final.

== Seeds ==
1. (Australia) Christopher O'Connell (second round, withdrew)
2. (Canada) Vasek Pospisil (first round)
3. (United States) Ernesto Escobedo (first round)
4. (France) Constant Lestienne (champion)
5. (Ecuador) Emilio Gómez (final)
6. (Turkey) Altuğ Çelikbilek (semifinals)
7. (United States) Michael Mmoh (semifinals)
8. (Chinese Taipei) Wu Tung-lin (first round)

== Draw ==
Key

- Q = Qualifier
- WC = Wild card
- LL = Lucky loser
- Alt = Alternate
- ITF = ITF entry
- PR = Protected ranking
- SR = Special ranking
- SE = Special exempt
- JE = Junior exempt
- JR = Junior Accelerator Programme entrant
- CO = College Accelerator Programme entrant
- NG = Next Gen Accelerator Program entrant
- w/o = Walkover
- r = Retired
- d = Defaulted

=== Finals ===
Semifinals
7	(United States) Michael Mmoh	6	4	4
4	(France) Constant Lestienne	4	6	6
5	(Ecuador) Emilio Gómez	5	7^{7}	7^{8}
6	(Turkey) Altuğ Çelikbilek	7	6^{0}	6^{6}

Final
4	(France) Constant Lestienne	6	5	6
5	(Ecuador) Emilio Gómez	3	7	2

=== Top half ===
First round
1	(Australia) C O'Connell	4	6	6
(United States) Em Nava	6	1	2
WC	(Australia) B Tomic	6^{5}	0
(Germany) D Masur	7^{7}	6
A Kuznetsov	6	4	1
Q	(India) Y Bhambri	4	6	6
Q	(Brazil) G Décamps	5	1
7	(United States) M Mmoh	7	6
4	(France) C Lestienne	2	6	7^{7}
E Donskoy	6	3	6^{4}
Q	(Israel) D Cukierman	2	5
(Chinese Taipei) J Jung	6	7
PR	(Italy) R Marcora	4	6	6
(Slovakia) L Lacko	6	4	4
Alt	(Canada) S Diez	6	6
8	(Chinese Taipei) T-l Wu	3	4

Second round
1	(Australia) C O'Connell
(Germany) D Masur	w/o
Q	(India) Y Bhambri
7	(United States) M Mmoh	w/o
4	(France) C Lestienne	6	6
(Chinese Taipei) J Jung	1	3
PR	(Italy) R Marcora	3	4
Alt	(Canada) S Diez	6	6

Quarterfinals
(Germany) D Masur	6	3	4
7	(United States) M Mmoh	4	6	6
4	(France) C Lestienne	6	3	7^{8}
Alt	(Canada) S Diez	1	6	6^{6}

Semifinals
7	(United States) M Mmoh	6	4	4
4	(France) C Lestienne	4	6	6

=== Bottom half ===
First round
5	(Ecuador) E Gómez	7^{8}	5	6
(Japan) Y Uchiyama	6^{6}	7	4
(Kazakhstan) D Popko	4	1
Alt	(Japan) K Uchida	6	6
Q	(Australia) J McCabe	2	6	6
(France) A Escoffier	6	3	0
Alt	(Spain) N Álvarez Varona	7^{7}	6
3	(United States) E Escobedo	6^{4}	3
6	(Turkey) A Çelikbilek	6	6^{5}	7
(Japan) H Moriya	3	7^{7}	5
(Portugal) F Ferreira Silva	7	2	3
Q	(Czech Republic) M Gengel	5	6	6
WC	(Spain) D Mérida	3	6	4
Q	A Kachmazov	6	3	6
WC	(Spain) A Barroso Campos	6	6
2	(Canada) V Pospisil	3	4

Second round
5	(Ecuador) E Gómez	6	6
Alt	(Japan) K Uchida	1	4
Q	(Australia) J McCabe	6	6
Alt	(Spain) N Álvarez Varona	4	1
6	(Turkey) A Çelikbilek	6	6
Q	(Czech Republic) M Gengel	1	1
Q	A Kachmazov	7^{7}	1	2
WC	(Spain) A Barroso Campos	6^{3}	6	6

Quarterfinals
5	(Ecuador) E Gómez	6	4	6
Q	(Australia) J McCabe	2	6	1
6	(Turkey) A Çelikbilek	7	2	6
WC	(Spain) A Barroso Campos	5	6	3

Semifinals
5	(Ecuador) E Gómez	5	7^{7}	7^{8}
6	(Turkey) A Çelikbilek	7	6^{0}	6^{6}
