= 2023 Rafa Nadal Open – Singles =

Singles
- 2023 Rafa Nadal Open

Final
- Champion: (Serbia) Hamad Medjedovic
- Runner-up: (France) Harold Mayot
- Score: 6–2, 4–6, 6–2

Events
Singles	Doubles
- Rafa Nadal Open

Luca Nardi was the defending champion but chose not to defend his title.

Hamad Medjedovic won the title after defeating Harold Mayot 6–2, 4–6, 6–2 in the final.

== Seeds ==
1. (Chile) Tomás Barrios Vera (first round)
2. (Serbia) Hamad Medjedovic (champion)
3. (France) Antoine Escoffier (quarterfinals)
4. (Sweden) Elias Ymer (first round)
5. (Italy) Mattia Bellucci (quarterfinals)
6. (Switzerland) Alexander Ritschard (first round)
7. (France) Harold Mayot (final)
8. (Italy) Federico Gaio (first round)

== Draw ==
Key

- Q = Qualifier
- WC = Wild card
- LL = Lucky loser
- Alt = Alternate
- ITF = ITF entry
- PR = Protected ranking
- SR = Special ranking
- SE = Special exempt
- JE = Junior exempt
- JR = Junior Accelerator Programme entrant
- CO = College Accelerator Programme entrant
- NG = Next Gen Accelerator Program entrant
- w/o = Walkover
- r = Retired
- d = Defaulted

=== Finals ===
Semifinals
7	(France) Harold Mayot	7	7
Q	(Bosnia and Herzegovina) Damir Džumhur	5	5
Alt	(Spain) Daniel Rincón	3	2
2	(Serbia) Hamad Medjedovic	6	6

Final
7	(France) Harold Mayot	2	6	2
2	(Serbia) Hamad Medjedovic	6	4	6

=== Top half ===
First round
1	(Chile) T Barrios Vera	1	6	2
Alt	(France) Jules Marie	6	4	6
WC	(Hong Kong) C Wong	3	6	4
Alt	(Dominican Republic) N Hardt	6	3	6
Alt	(Portugal) J Sousa	6	7^{7}
Alt	(North Macedonia) K Ivanovski	4	6^{5}
Q	(Israel) D Cukierman	1	6^{1}
7	(France) H Mayot	6	7^{7}
4	(Sweden) E Ymer	4	3
(United Kingdom) A Fery	6	6
Q	(France) M Janvier	6^{4}	6	4
Alt	(Estonia) M Lajal	7^{7}	2	6
Q	(Germany) P Gojowczyk	6	4	6^{9}
WC	(Spain) M Landaluce	3	6	7^{11}
Q	(Bosnia and Herzegovina) D Džumhur	3	6	7^{7}
6	(Switzerland) A Ritschard	6	3	6^{4}

Second round
Alt	(France) J Marie	6	0	1
Alt	(Dominican Republic) N Hardt	4	6	6
Alt	(Portugal) J Sousa	3	6	6^{5}
7	(France) H Mayot	6	3	7^{7}
(United Kingdom) A Fery	3	3
Alt	(Estonia) M Lajal	6	6
WC	(Spain) M Landaluce	1	5
Q	(Bosnia and Herzegovina) D Džumhur	6	7

Quarterfinals
Alt	(Dominican Republic) N Hardt	6	5	2
7	(France) H Mayot	2	7	6
Alt	(Estonia) M Lajal	3	3
Q	(Bosnia and Herzegovina) D Džumhur	6	6

Semifinals
7	(France) H Mayot	7	7
Q	(Bosnia and Herzegovina) D Džumhur	5	5

=== Bottom half ===
First round
8	(Italy) F Gaio	4	6	5
Alt	(Spain) D Rincón	6	4	7
Alt	(Argentina) M Trungelliti	6	6
(United Kingdom) J Monday	4	4
Alt	(Austria) M Neuchrist	0	3
Alt	(Spain) A Moro Cañas	6	6
Q	(Colombia) A Soriano Barrera	2	6^{8}
3	(France) A Escoffier	6	7^{10}
5	(Italy) M Bellucci	6	6
WC	Y Demin	2	2
Alt	(Portugal) F Ferreira Silva	6	6
Q	(Portugal) G Elias	3	1
(France) L Lokoli	6	7
Alt	(Jordan) A Shelbayh	4	5
Alt	(Colombia) N Mejía	1	4
2	(Serbia) H Medjedovic	6	6

Second round
Alt	(Spain) D Rincón	7^{7}	6
Alt	(Argentina) M Trungelliti	6^{2}	1
Alt	(Spain) A Moro Cañas	6	4	0
3	(France) A Escoffier	2	6	6
5	(Italy) M Bellucci	6	7^{7}
Alt	(Portugal) F Ferreira Silva	4	6^{2}
(France) L Lokoli	7	3	2
2	(Serbia) H Medjedovic	5	6	6

Quarterfinals
Alt	(Spain) D Rincón	3	6	7
3	(France) A Escoffier	6	3	5
5	(Italy) M Bellucci	5	6^{3}
2	(Serbia) H Medjedovic	7	7^{7}

Semifinals
Alt	(Spain) D Rincón	3	2
2	(Serbia) H Medjedovic	6	6
