= 2022 Málaga Open – Doubles =

Doubles
- 2022 Málaga Open

Final
- Champions: (Turkey) Altuğ Çelikbilek (Kazakhstan) Dmitry Popko
- Runners-up: (Israel) Daniel Cukierman (Ecuador) Emilio Gómez
- Score: 6–7^{(4–7)}, 6–4, [10–6]

Events
| Singles | Doubles |
- Málaga Open

This was the first edition of the tournament.

Altuğ Çelikbilek and Dmitry Popko won the title after defeating Daniel Cukierman and Emilio Gómez 6–7^{(4–7)}, 6–4, [10–6] in the final.

== Seeds ==
1. (Romania) Victor Vlad Cornea / (India) Arjun Kadhe (semifinals)
2. (India) Yuki Bhambri / (India) Saketh Myneni (semifinals)
3. (Philippines) Ruben Gonzales / (United States) Reese Stalder (first round)
4. (Bolivia) Boris Arias / (Bolivia) Federico Zeballos (first round)

== Draw ==
Key

- Q = Qualifier
- WC = Wild card
- LL = Lucky loser
- Alt = Alternate
- ITF = ITF entry
- PR = Protected ranking
- SR = Special ranking
- SE = Special exempt
- JE = Junior exempt
- JR = Junior Accelerator Programme entrant
- CO = College Accelerator Programme entrant
- NG = Next Gen Accelerator Program entrant
- w/o = Walkover
- r = Retired
- d = Defaulted

First round
WC | (Spain) Sergi Pérez Contri (Spain) A Soriano Barrera | 7^{7} | 6
(Czech Republic) M Gengel (Japan) K Uchida | 6^{5} | 3
3 | (Philippines) R Gonzales (United States) R Stalder | 4 | 7 | [7]
(Turkey) A Çelikbilek (Kazakhstan) D Popko | 6 | 5 | [10]
(Spain) N Álvarez Varona (Spain) C Sánchez Jover | 4 | 6^{6}
(Canada) S Diez (Japan) H Moriya | 6 | 7^{8}
(Australia) O Jasika (Australia) J McCabe | 6^{3} | 3
(Israel) D Cukierman (Ecuador) E Gómez | 7^{7} | 6
(Republic of Ireland) S Carr; A Kachmazov | 7^{7} | 6
4 | (Bolivia) B Arias (Bolivia) F Zeballos | 6^{4} | 1
WC | (Spain) D Marrero (United States) Dhruva Mulye | 2 | 2
(Switzerland) L Margaroli (Japan) Y Uchiyama | 6 | 6
E Donskoy; A Kuznetsov | 3 | 6^{4}
2 | (India) Y Bhambri (India) S Myneni | 6 | 7^{7}

Quarterfinals
1 | (Romania) VV Cornea (India) A Kadhe | 6 | 6
WC | (Spain) S Pérez Contri (Spain) A Soriano Barrera | 3 | 2
(Turkey) A Çelikbilek (Kazakhstan) D Popko | 6 | 6
(Canada) S Diez (Japan) H Moriya | 0 | 2
(Israel) D Cukierman (Ecuador) E Gómez | 6 | 6
(Republic of Ireland) S Carr; A Kachmazov | 4 | 2
(Switzerland) L Margaroli (Japan) Y Uchiyama | 7^{10} | 2 | [8]
2 | (India) Y Bhambri (India) S Myneni | 6^{8} | 6 | [10]

Semifinals
1 | (Romania) VV Cornea (India) A Kadhe | 7^{7} | 3 | [8]
(Turkey) A Çelikbilek (Kazakhstan) D Popko | 6^{2} | 6 | [10]
(Israel) D Cukierman (Ecuador) E Gómez | 6 | 6
2 | (India) Y Bhambri (India) S Myneni | 4 | 4

Final
(Turkey) A Çelikbilek (Kazakhstan) D Popko | 6^{4} | 6 | [10]
(Israel) D Cukierman (Ecuador) E Gómez | 7^{7} | 4 | [6]
