= 2025 Glasgow Challenger – Singles =

Singles
- 2025 Glasgow Challenger

Final
- Champion: (Norway) Nicolai Budkov Kjær
- Runner-up: (Norway) Viktor Durasovic
- Score: 6–4, 6–3

Events
Singles	Doubles
- Glasgow Challenger

Clément Chidekh was the defending champion but lost in the first round to Matteo Martineau.

Nicolai Budkov Kjær won the title after defeating Viktor Durasovic 6–4, 6–3 in the final.

== Seeds ==
1. (France) Constant Lestienne (second round)
2. (Hong Kong) Coleman Wong (second round)
3. (United Kingdom) Dan Evans (second round)
4. (Canada) Liam Draxl (quarterfinals)
5. (France) Clément Chidekh (first round)
6. (France) Hugo Grenier (first round)
7. (Belgium) Gauthier Onclin (first round)
8. (Poland) Maks Kaśnikowski (first round)

== Draw ==
Key

- Q = Qualifier
- WC = Wild card
- LL = Lucky loser
- Alt = Alternate
- ITF = ITF entry
- PR = Protected ranking
- SR = Special ranking
- SE = Special exempt
- JE = Junior exempt
- JR = Junior Accelerator Programme entrant
- CO = College Accelerator Programme entrant
- NG = Next Gen Accelerator Program entrant
- w/o = Walkover
- r = Retired
- d = Defaulted

=== Finals ===
Semifinals
(Germany) Max Hans Rehberg	3	6^{3}
(Norway) Nicolai Budkov Kjær	6	7^{7}
(Spain) Daniel Rincón	7^{7}	3	0
Alt	(Norway) Viktor Durasovic	6^{2}	6	6

Final
(Norway) Nicolai Budkov Kjær	6	6
Alt	(Norway) Viktor Durasovic	4	3

=== Top half ===
First round
1	(France) C Lestienne	7	6
WC	(United Kingdom) H Searle	5	0
Q	(Germany) C Negritu	1	2
(Germany) MH Rehberg	6	6
WC	(United Kingdom) J Monday	7^{8}	6
(Japan) R Sakamoto	6^{6}	4
LL	(United Kingdom) G Hussey	6	6^{6}	6
8	(Poland) M Kaśnikowski	4	7^{8}	4
4	(Canada) L Draxl	6	6
(Bulgaria) A Andreev	4	1
(Spain) B Zapata Miralles	6	6
(Germany) D Masur	2	3
(Lebanon) B Hassan	5	6	3
Q	(Italy) R Brancaccio	7	2	6
(Norway) N Budkov Kjær	6	3	6
6	(France) H Grenier	3	6	2

Second round
1	(France) C Lestienne	3	6^{5}
(Germany) MH Rehberg	6	7^{7}
WC	(United Kingdom) J Monday	7	6
LL	(United Kingdom) G Hussey	5	3
4	(Canada) L Draxl	6	6
(Spain) B Zapata Miralles	3	2
Q	(Italy) R Brancaccio	4	6^{7}
(Norway) N Budkov Kjær	6	7^{9}

Quarterfinals
(Germany) MH Rehberg	7^{7}	4	4
WC	(United Kingdom) J Monday	6^{5}	6	2^{r}
4	(Canada) L Draxl	3	6	1
(Norway) N Budkov Kjær	6	1	6

Semifinals
(Germany) MH Rehberg	3	6^{3}
(Norway) N Budkov Kjær	6	7^{7}

=== Bottom half ===
First round
7	(Belgium) G Onclin	4	3
Alt	(South Africa) P Henning	6	6
Q	(United Kingdom) H Wendelken	5	3
(Kazakhstan) D Yevseyev	7	6
(Spain) D Rincón	6	6^{8}	6
(Luxembourg) C Rodesch	4	7^{10}	4
Q	(United Kingdom) S Parker	3	6^{5}
3/WC	(United Kingdom) D Evans	6	7^{7}
5	(France) C Chidekh	4	6^{3}
(France) M Martineau	6	7^{7}
(Kazakhstan) B Zhukayev	7^{7}	6
(Switzerland) R Bertola	6^{3}	3
Alt	(Norway) V Durasovic	6	6^{7}	6
Q	(United Kingdom) James Story	1	7^{9}	2
(Germany) R Molleker	3	2
2	(Hong Kong) C Wong	6	6

Second round
Alt	(South Africa) P Henning	2	3
(Kazakhstan) D Yevseyev	6	6
(Spain) D Rincón	7^{9}	7^{11}
3/WC	(United Kingdom) D Evans	6^{7}	6^{9}
(France) M Martineau	6	6
(Kazakhstan) B Zhukayev	4	4
Alt	(Norway) V Durasovic	4	6	6
2	(Hong Kong) C Wong	6	1	2

Quarterfinals
(Kazakhstan) D Yevseyev	3	3
(Spain) D Rincón	6	6
(France) M Martineau	6	3	6^{3}
Alt	(Norway) V Durasovic	4	6	7^{7}

Semifinals
(Spain) D Rincón	7^{7}	3	0
Alt	(Norway) V Durasovic	6^{2}	6	6
