= 2024 Glasgow Challenger – Doubles =

Doubles
- 2024 Glasgow Challenger

Final
- Champions: (United Kingdom) Scott Duncan (United Kingdom) Marcus Willis
- Runners-up: (United Kingdom) Kyle Edmund (United Kingdom) Henry Searle
- Score: 6–3, 6–2

Events
Singles	Doubles
- Glasgow Challenger

This was the first edition of the tournament.

Scott Duncan and Marcus Willis won the title after defeating Kyle Edmund and Henry Searle 6–3, 6–2 in the final.

== Seeds ==
1. (United Kingdom) Scott Duncan / (United Kingdom) Marcus Willis (champions)
2. (United Kingdom) Charles Broom / (United Kingdom) Ben Jones (quarterfinals)
3. (Australia) Thomas Fancutt / (United States) Hunter Reese (semifinals)
4. (United Kingdom) George Houghton / (United Kingdom) Mark Whitehouse (first round)

== Draw ==
Key

- Q = Qualifier
- WC = Wild card
- LL = Lucky loser
- Alt = Alternate
- ITF = ITF entry
- PR = Protected ranking
- SR = Special ranking
- SE = Special exempt
- JE = Junior exempt
- JR = Junior Accelerator Programme entrant
- CO = College Accelerator Programme entrant
- NG = Next Gen Accelerator Program entrant
- w/o = Walkover
- r = Retired
- d = Defaulted

First round
1	(United Kingdom) S Duncan (United Kingdom) M Willis	6	6
(Czech Republic) D Poljak (United Kingdom) H Wendelken	4	2
(Germany) Elmar Ejupovic (Italy) A Guerrieri	6	6
(France) C Chidekh (Israel) R Stepanov	3	2
3	(Australia) T Fancutt (United States) H Reese	6	6
PR	(Zimbabwe) B Lock (Zimbabwe) CJ Lock	4	4
Alt	(Switzerland) J Kym (United Kingdom) A McHugh	6	7^{9}
(Turkey) A Çelikbilek (Latvia) R Strombachs	4	6^{7}
(Canada) S Diez (Spain) D Jordà Sanchis	4	4
(United States) S Kirchheimer (United States) Nathan Ponwith	6	6
WC	(United Kingdom) K Edmund (United Kingdom) H Searle	6	6
4	(United Kingdom) George Houghton (United Kingdom) M Whitehouse	1	4
WC	(United Kingdom) James Davis (United Kingdom) H Stewart	6	6^{6}	[12]
(United Kingdom) G Hussey (United Kingdom) S Parker	0	7^{8}	[10]
Alt	(Luxembourg) A Knaff (United Kingdom) J MacKinlay	7	3	[5]
2	(United Kingdom) C Broom (United Kingdom) B Jones	5	6	[10]

Quarterfinals
1	(United Kingdom) S Duncan (United Kingdom) M Willis	6	6
(Germany) E Ejupovic (Italy) A Guerrieri	0	1
3	(Australia) T Fancutt (United States) H Reese	6	7^{8}
Alt	(Switzerland) J Kym (United Kingdom) A McHugh	2	6^{6}
(United States) S Kirchheimer (United States) N Ponwith	6	4	[5]
WC	(United Kingdom) K Edmund (United Kingdom) H Searle	2	6	[10]
WC	(United Kingdom) J Davis (United Kingdom) H Stewart	6	1	[10]
2	(United Kingdom) C Broom (United Kingdom) B Jones	4	6	[6]

Semifinals
1	(United Kingdom) S Duncan (United Kingdom) M Willis	7^{9}	6^{5}	[10]
3	(Australia) T Fancutt (United States) H Reese	6^{7}	7^{7}	[7]
WC	(United Kingdom) K Edmund (United Kingdom) H Searle	6	3	[10]
WC	(United Kingdom) J Davis (United Kingdom) H Stewart	4	6	[5]

Final
1	(United Kingdom) S Duncan (United Kingdom) M Willis	6	6
WC	(United Kingdom) K Edmund (United Kingdom) H Searle	3	2
