= 2026 Glasgow Challenger – Singles =

Singles
- 2026 Glasgow Challenger

Final
- Champion: (France) Clément Chidekh
- Runner-up: (Kazakhstan) Mikhail Kukushkin
- Score: 5–7, 6–1, 4–0 ret.

Events
Singles	Doubles
- Glasgow Challenger

Nicolai Budkov Kjær was the defending champion but chose not to defend his title.

Clément Chidekh won the title after Mikhail Kukushkin retired trailing 7–5, 1–6, 0–4 in the final.

== Seeds ==
1. (United Kingdom) Johannus Monday (quarterfinals)
2. (France) Clément Chidekh (champion)
3. (Switzerland) Rémy Bertola (second round)
4. (Bulgaria) Dimitar Kuzmanov (second round)
5. (Portugal) Frederico Ferreira Silva (first round, retired)
6. (Portugal) Tiago Pereira (first round)
7. (Lithuania) Edas Butvilas (first round)
8. (Germany) Henri Squire (second round)

== Draw ==
Key

- Q = Qualifier
- WC = Wild card
- LL = Lucky loser
- Alt = Alternate
- ITF = ITF entry
- PR = Protected ranking
- SR = Special ranking
- SE = Special exempt
- JE = Junior exempt
- JR = Junior Accelerator Programme entrant
- CO = College Accelerator Programme entrant
- NG = Next Gen Accelerator Program entrant
- w/o = Walkover
- r = Retired
- d = Defaulted

=== Finals ===
Semifinals
(Czech Republic) Hynek Bartoň	4	6^{4}
(Kazakhstan) Mikhail Kukushkin	6	7^{7}
(Slovakia) Norbert Gombos	3	7^{10}	4
2	(France) Clément Chidekh	6	6^{8}	6

Final
(Kazakhstan) Mikhail Kukushkin	7	1	0^{r}
2	(France) Clément Chidekh	5	6	4

=== Top half ===
First round
1	(United Kingdom) J Monday	6	6^{3}	6
Q	(Czech Republic) M Krumich	3	7^{7}	3
WC	(United Kingdom) A Gray	6	6
(United Kingdom) G Hussey	3	4
(France) Mathys Erhard	6^{12}	2
(Czech Republic) H Bartoň	7^{14}	6
LL	(Kazakhstan) D Yevseyev	6	6
6	(Portugal) T Pereira	4	2
3	(Switzerland) R Bertola	4	6	7^{7}
(Austria) S Kopp	6	3	6^{2}
(Colombia) A Soriano Barrera	2	6^{5}
(Kazakhstan) M Kukushkin	6	7^{7}
(Germany) T Gentzsch	7^{7}	6
Q	(Denmark) CE Overbeck	6^{2}	2
Q	(Germany) M Möller	6	1
5	(Portugal) F Ferreira Silva	3	0^{r}

Second round
1	(United Kingdom) J Monday	7^{7}	7^{7}
WC	(United Kingdom) A Gray	6^{3}	6^{3}
(Czech Republic) H Bartoň	6	6
LL	(Kazakhstan) D Yevseyev	2	2
3	(Switzerland) R Bertola	1	2
(Kazakhstan) M Kukushkin	6	6
(Germany) T Gentzsch	7	6
Q	(Germany) M Möller	5	2

Quarterfinals
1	(United Kingdom) J Monday	6^{2}	3
(Czech Republic) H Bartoň	7^{7}	6
(Kazakhstan) M Kukushkin	6	6
(Germany) T Gentzsch	2	4

Semifinals
(Czech Republic) H Bartoň	4	6^{4}
(Kazakhstan) M Kukushkin	6	7^{7}

=== Bottom half ===
First round
7	(Lithuania) E Butvilas	5	6	3
(Slovakia) N Gombos	7	3	6
(United Kingdom) H Wendelken	6	3	6
(United States) S Kozlov	1	6	4
(United Kingdom) L Broady	6	6
(Spain) M Damas	0	0
WC	(United Kingdom) P Jubb	2	3
4	(Bulgaria) D Kuzmanov	6	6
8	(Germany) H Squire	6	3	6
WC	(United Kingdom) L Maxted	1	6	3
(United Kingdom) C Broom	6^{3}	6	7^{7}
(Germany) C Negritu	7^{7}	4	6^{3}
Q	(Germany) D Masur	7^{11}	7^{7}
Q	(Slovakia) M Karol	6^{9}	6^{4}
Q	(United Kingdom) H Searle	6^{7}	4
2	(France) C Chidekh	7^{9}	6

Second round
(Slovakia) N Gombos	6	7^{7}
(United Kingdom) H Wendelken	3	6^{5}
(United Kingdom) L Broady	7^{7}	6^{6}	6
4	(Bulgaria) D Kuzmanov	6^{3}	7^{8}	2
8	(Germany) H Squire	4	6^{6}
(United Kingdom) C Broom	6	7^{8}
Q	(Germany) D Masur	6^{5}	7	6^{0}
2	(France) C Chidekh	7^{7}	5	7^{7}

Quarterfinals
(Slovakia) N Gombos	6	3	6
(United Kingdom) L Broady	2	6	1
(United Kingdom) C Broom	4	3
2	(France) C Chidekh	6	6

Semifinals
(Slovakia) N Gombos	3	7^{10}	4
2	(France) C Chidekh	6	6^{8}	6
