= 2023 Málaga Open =

- Date: 9–15 October
- Edition: 2nd
- Surface: Hard
- Location: Málaga, Spain

Champions

Singles
- (France) Ugo Blanchet

Doubles
- (United Kingdom) Julian Cash / (United States) Robert Galloway
← 2022 ·	Málaga Open	· 2024 →

The 2023 Málaga Open was a professional tennis tournament played on hard courts. It was the second edition of the tournament which was part of the 2023 ATP Challenger Tour. It took place in Málaga, Spain between 9 and 15 October 2023.

== Singles main draw entrants ==
=== Seeds ===
Country	Player	Rank^{1}	Seed
ESP	Roberto Bautista Agut	40	1
ESP	Roberto Carballés Baena	61	2
ESP	Bernabé Zapata Miralles	70	3
COL	Daniel Elahi Galán	90	4
ESP	Albert Ramos Viñolas	93	5
FRA	Constant Lestienne	107	6
ARG	Thiago Agustín Tirante	111	7
ESP	Pedro Martínez	116	8

- ^{1} Rankings as of 25 September 2023.

=== Other entrants ===
The following players received wildcards into the singles main draw:

- (Belgium) Gilles-Arnaud Bailly
- (Spain) Roberto Bautista Agut
- (Spain) Pablo Carreño Busta

The following player received entry into the singles main draw as a special exempt:

- (France) Hugo Grenier

The following player received entry into the singles main draw as an alternate:

- (Bulgaria) Adrian Andreev

The following players received entry from the qualifying draw:

- (Switzerland) Antoine Bellier
- (France) Ugo Blanchet
- (Italy) Raúl Brancaccio
- (United Kingdom) Billy Harris
- (France) Maxime Janvier
- (Spain) Alejandro Moro Cañas

== Champions ==
=== Singles ===
- (France) Ugo Blanchet def. (Italy) Mattia Bellucci 6–4, 6–4.

=== Doubles ===
- (United Kingdom) Julian Cash / (United States) Robert Galloway def. (Australia) Andrew Harris / (Australia) John-Patrick Smith 7–5, 6–2.
