= 2026 Olbia Challenger – Singles =

Singles
- 2026 Olbia Challenger

Final
- Champion: (Bosnia and Herzegovina) Damir Džumhur
- Runner-up: (United Kingdom) Jacob Fearnley
- Score: 7–6^{(7–4)}, 6–3

Events
Singles	Doubles
- Olbia Challenger

Luca Van Assche was the defending champion but chose not to defend his title.

Damir Džumhur won the title after defeating Jacob Fearnley 7–6^{(7–4)}, 6–3 in the final.

== Seeds ==
1. (United Kingdom) Jacob Fearnley (final)
2. (Bosnia and Herzegovina) Damir Džumhur (champion)
3. (France) Valentin Royer (second round)
4. (United States) Michael Mmoh (quarterfinals)
5. (Germany) Tom Gentzsch (quarterfinals)
6. (Italy) Andrea Guerrieri (second round)
7. (United States) Mackenzie McDonald (first round, retired)
8. (Italy) Francesco Maestrelli (second round)

== Draw ==
Key

- Q = Qualifier
- WC = Wild card
- LL = Lucky loser
- Alt = Alternate
- ITF = ITF entry
- PR = Protected ranking
- SR = Special ranking
- SE = Special exempt
- JE = Junior exempt
- JR = Junior Accelerator Programme entrant
- CO = College Accelerator Programme entrant
- NG = Next Gen Accelerator Program entrant
- w/o = Walkover
- r = Retired
- d = Defaulted

=== Finals ===
Semifinals
1	(United Kingdom) Jacob Fearnley	6	6
(Italy) Luca Nardi	2	4
(Poland) Maks Kaśnikowski	1	5
2	(Bosnia and Herzegovina) Damir Džumhur	6	7

Final
1	(United Kingdom) Jacob Fearnley	6^{4}	3
2	(Bosnia and Herzegovina) Damir Džumhur	7^{7}	6

=== Top half ===
First round
1	(United Kingdom) J Fearnley	6	6
Q	(United Kingdom) G Loffhagen	1	3
(Czech Republic) J Kumstát	7^{7}	7^{7}
(Lithuania) E Butvilas	6^{4}	6^{5}
Alt	(Czech Republic) H Bartoň	2	1^{r}
(Czech Republic) M Mrva	6	2
Alt	(Croatia) M Poljičak	2	3
8	(Italy) F Maestrelli	6	6
4	(United States) M Mmoh	6	6
(Serbia) L Djere	4	3
WC	(Italy) S Pieri	0	2
(Spain) D Rincón	6	6
(Italy) L Nardi	4	6	6
(Denmark) A Holmgren	6	4	4
WC	(Italy) Lorenzo Carboni	6^{5}	6	1
7	(United States) M McDonald	7^{7}	4	0^{r}

Second round
1	(United Kingdom) J Fearnley	6	6
(Czech Republic) J Kumstát	4	3
(Czech Republic) M Mrva	6	6
8	(Italy) F Maestrelli	3	4
4	(United States) M Mmoh	7	6
(Spain) D Rincón	5	2
(Italy) L Nardi	6	6
WC	(Italy) L Carboni	4	1

Quarterfinals
1	(United Kingdom) J Fearnley	6	7^{7}
(Czech Republic) M Mrva	0	6^{4}
4	(United States) M Mmoh	4	4
(Italy) L Nardi	6	6

Semifinals
1	(United Kingdom) J Fearnley	6	6
(Italy) L Nardi	2	4

=== Bottom half ===
First round
6	(Italy) A Guerrieri	6	6
(Jordan) A Shelbayh	2	3
(Poland) M Kaśnikowski	6	6
Alt	(Romania) C Crețu	2	1
(Italy) S Travaglia	3	7	6
Q	(Norway) V Durasovic	6	5	3
Q	(France) Mathys Erhard	6^{2}	0
3	(France) V Royer	7^{7}	6
5	(Germany) T Gentzsch	4	6	6
Q	(Netherlands) N Visker	6	3	4
LL	(France) L Lokoli	7^{7}	5	6^{1}
Q	(Ukraine) G Kravchenko	6^{4}	7	7^{7}
Q	(Bulgaria) D Kuzmanov	6	6
WC	(Italy) Simone Massellani	1	1
PR	(Tunisia) A Dougaz	3	6	3
2	(Bosnia and Herzegovina) D Džumhur	6	2	6

Second round
6	(Italy) A Guerrieri	3	4
(Poland) M Kaśnikowski	6	6
(Italy) S Travaglia	6	7
3	(France) V Royer	2	5
5	(Germany) T Gentzsch	6	3	6
Q	(Ukraine) G Kravchenko	3	6	4
Q	(Bulgaria) D Kuzmanov	6	6^{7}	0
2	(Bosnia and Herzegovina) D Džumhur	0	7^{9}	6

Quarterfinals
(Poland) M Kaśnikowski	6	7
(Italy) S Travaglia	2	5
5	(Germany) T Gentzsch	0	3
2	(Bosnia and Herzegovina) D Džumhur	6	6

Semifinals
(Poland) M Kaśnikowski	1	5
2	(Bosnia and Herzegovina) D Džumhur	6	7
