= 2024 Glasgow Challenger – Singles =

Singles
- 2024 Glasgow Challenger

Final
- Champion: (France) Clément Chidekh
- Runner-up: (United Kingdom) Paul Jubb
- Score: 0–6, 6–4, 6–1

Events
Singles	Doubles
- Glasgow Challenger

This was the first edition of the tournament.

Clément Chidekh won the title after defeating Paul Jubb 0–6, 6–4, 6–1 in the final.

== Seeds ==
1. (France) Calvin Hemery (first round)
2. (Bulgaria) Dimitar Kuzmanov (first round)
3. (Italy) Francesco Maestrelli (first round)
4. (France) Manuel Guinard (semifinals)
5. (Czech Republic) Jiří Veselý (first round)
6. (Canada) Steven Diez (second round)
7. (Spain) David Jordà Sanchis (first round)
8. (United Kingdom) Charles Broom (second round)

== Draw ==
Key

- Q = Qualifier
- WC = Wild card
- LL = Lucky loser
- Alt = Alternate
- ITF = ITF entry
- PR = Protected ranking
- SR = Special ranking
- SE = Special exempt
- JE = Junior exempt
- JR = Junior Accelerator Programme entrant
- CO = College Accelerator Programme entrant
- NG = Next Gen Accelerator Program entrant
- w/o = Walkover
- r = Retired
- d = Defaulted

=== Finals ===
Semifinals
(France) Clément Chidekh	6	6
4	(France) Manuel Guinard	3	4
Q	(United Kingdom) Paul Jubb	4	7^{7}	6
(Germany) Elmar Ejupovic	6	6^{3}	3

Final
(France) Clément Chidekh	0	6	6
Q	(United Kingdom) Paul Jubb	6	4	1

=== Top half ===
First round
1	(France) C Hemery	4	4
WC	(United Kingdom) H Stewart	6	6
(Latvia) R Strombachs	7^{7}	6
(United Kingdom) A Matusevich	6^{3}	1
(Poland) K Żuk	5	2
(France) C Chidekh	7	6
(Spain) C Taberner	5	7^{7}	6
7	(Spain) D Jordà Sanchis	7	6^{4}	4
4	(France) M Guinard	6	5	4
(Belgium) A Blockx	1	7	1^{r}
E Gerasimov	6	7^{7}
(Egypt) M Safwat	1	6^{2}
(Turkey) A Çelikbilek	3	3
Q	(Germany) N Kuhn	6	6
(Israel) Y Oliel	4	7	6^{5}
6	(Canada) S Diez	6	5	7^{7}

Second round
WC	(United Kingdom) H Stewart	1	7	6
(Latvia) R Strombachs	6	5	1
(France) C Chidekh	6	6
(Spain) C Taberner	4	2
4	(France) M Guinard	6	6
E Gerasimov	3	4
Q	(Germany) N Kuhn	6	6
6	(Canada) S Diez	3	1

Quarterfinals
WC	(United Kingdom) H Stewart	6	4	4
(France) C Chidekh	4	6	6
4	(France) M Guinard	7^{7}	6
Q	(Germany) N Kuhn	6^{4}	3

Semifinals
(France) C Chidekh	6	6
4	(France) M Guinard	3	4

=== Bottom half ===
First round
5	(Czech Republic) J Veselý	6^{5}	4
WC	(United Kingdom) H Searle	7^{7}	6
Q	(United Kingdom) D Cox	6	6
PR	(Switzerland) J Kym	3	4
Q	(United Kingdom) Charlie Robertson	6	7^{7}
(Belgium) T Colson	4	6^{3}
Q	(United Kingdom) P Jubb	6	5	6
3	(Italy) F Maestrelli	4	7	3
8	(United Kingdom) C Broom	4	6	7^{7}
(United Kingdom) A McHugh	6	2	6^{5}
(Zimbabwe) B Lock	5	4
(Germany) Elmar Ejupovic	7	6
Q	(Poland) F Peliwo	4	3
Q	(United Kingdom) S Parker	6	6
WC	(United Kingdom) K Edmund	6	2	6
2	(Bulgaria) D Kuzmanov	3	6	2

Second round
WC	(United Kingdom) H Searle	6	6
Q	(United Kingdom) D Cox	4	4
Q	(United Kingdom) C Robertson	2	2
Q	(United Kingdom) P Jubb	6	6
8	(United Kingdom) C Broom	4	3
(Germany) E Ejupovic	6	6
Q	(United Kingdom) S Parker	7^{7}	7^{7}
WC	(United Kingdom) K Edmund	6^{4}	6^{5}

Quarterfinals
WC	(United Kingdom) H Searle	4	6	2
Q	(United Kingdom) P Jubb	6	4	6
(Germany) E Ejupovic	w/o
Q	(United Kingdom) S Parker

Semifinals
Q	(United Kingdom) P Jubb	4	7^{7}	6
(Germany) E Ejupovic	6	6^{3}	3
