= Glasgow Challenger =

- 2025 Glasgow Challenger

ATP Challenger Tour
- Event name: Lexus Glasgow Challenger
- Location: Glasgow, United Kingdom
- Venue: Scotstoun Leisure Centre
- Category: ATP Challenger Tour
- Surface: Hard (indoor)

The Lexus Glasgow Challenger is a professional tennis tournament played on indoor hardcourts. It is currently part of the ATP Challenger Tour. It was first held in Glasgow, United Kingdom in 2024.

== Past finals ==
=== Singles ===
Year	Champion	Runner-up	Score
2026	(France) Clément Chidekh	(Kazakhstan) Mikhail Kukushkin	5–7, 6–1, 4–0 ret.
2025	(Norway) Nicolai Budkov Kjær	(Norway) Viktor Durasovic	6–4, 6–3
2024	(France) Clément Chidekh	(United Kingdom) Paul Jubb	0–6, 6–4, 6–1

=== Doubles ===
Year	Champions	Runners-up	Score
2026	(Germany) Christoph Negritu (Colombia) Adrià Soriano Barrera	(United Kingdom) Charles Broom (United Kingdom) Ben Jones	2–6, 6–2, [10–4]
2025	(Israel) Daniel Cukierman (United Kingdom) Joshua Paris	(United States) Vasil Kirkov (United Kingdom) Marcus Willis	5–7, 6–4, [12–10]
2024	(United Kingdom) Scott Duncan (United Kingdom) Marcus Willis	(United Kingdom) Kyle Edmund (United Kingdom) Henry Searle	6–3, 6–2
