= 2026 Olbia Challenger – Doubles =

Doubles
- 2026 Olbia Challenger

Final
- Champions: (Netherlands) Jarno Jans (Belgium) Joran Vliegen
- Runners-up: (Israel) Daniel Cukierman (Brazil) Fernando Romboli
- Score: 6–3, 6–4

Events
| Singles | Doubles |
- Olbia Challenger

Arthur Reymond and Luca Sanchez were the defending champions but lost in the first round to Jarno Jans and Joran Vliegen.

Jans and Vliegen won the title after defeating Daniel Cukierman and Fernando Romboli 6–3, 6–4 in the final.

== Seeds ==
1. (United States) Robert Cash / (Austria) Alexander Erler (first round)
2. (Belgium) Sander Gillé / (Netherlands) Sem Verbeek (quarterfinals)
3. (Argentina) Máximo González / (Argentina) Andrés Molteni (quarterfinals)
4. (France) Arthur Reymond / (France) Luca Sanchez (first round)

== Draw ==
Key

- Q = Qualifier
- WC = Wild card
- LL = Lucky loser
- Alt = Alternate
- ITF = ITF entry
- PR = Protected ranking
- SR = Special ranking
- SE = Special exempt
- JE = Junior exempt
- JR = Junior Accelerator Programme entrant
- CO = College Accelerator Programme entrant
- NG = Next Gen Accelerator Program entrant
- w/o = Walkover
- r = Retired
- d = Defaulted

First round
1 | (United States) R Cash (Austria) A Erler | 4 | 6 | [10]
(Germany) D Masur (Germany) T Rühl | 6 | 3 | [12]
WC | (Italy) Daniel Frasconi (Italy) Lorenzo Rocco | 4 | 5
WC | (Italy) Andrea Colombo (Italy) Simone Massellani | 6 | 7
3 | (Argentina) M González (Argentina) A Molteni | 6 | 6
(India) N Kaliyanda Poonacha (Spain) D Vega Hernández | 0 | 1
(Italy) F Maestrelli (Italy) S Travaglia | 0 | 3
(Israel) D Cukierman (Brazil) F Romboli | 6 | 6
(Czech Republic) D Poljak (Netherlands) N Visker | 6 | 6
(Netherlands) M Hermans (India) VS Prashanth | 3 | 3
(Netherlands) J Jans (Belgium) J Vliegen | 6 | 6
4 | (France) A Reymond (France) L Sanchez | 3 | 2
(United States) N Lammons (United States) J Withrow | 6 | 7
(Bulgaria) A Donski (Poland) F Pieczonka | 3 | 5
(Czech Republic) J Kumstát (Czech Republic) M Mrva | 3 | 7^{7} | [4]
2 | (Belgium) S Gillé (Netherlands) S Verbeek | 6 | 6^{5} | [10]

Quarterfinals
(Germany) D Masur (Germany) T Rühl | 5 | 6 | [11]
WC | (Italy) A Colombo (Italy) S Massellani | 7 | 4 | [9]
3 | (Argentina) M González (Argentina) A Molteni | 5 | 4
(Israel) D Cukierman (Brazil) F Romboli | 7 | 6
(Czech Republic) D Poljak (Netherlands) N Visker | 3 | 6^{10}
(Netherlands) J Jans (Belgium) J Vliegen | 6 | 7^{12}
(United States) N Lammons (United States) J Withrow | 6 | 7^{7}
2 | (Belgium) S Gillé (Netherlands) S Verbeek | 3 | 6^{4}

Semifinals
(Germany) D Masur (Germany) T Rühl | 6^{4} | 3
(Israel) D Cukierman (Brazil) F Romboli | 7^{7} | 6
(Netherlands) J Jans (Belgium) J Vliegen | 7^{7} | 7^{7}
(United States) N Lammons (United States) J Withrow | 6^{3} | 6^{3}

Final
(Israel) D Cukierman (Brazil) F Romboli | 3 | 4
(Netherlands) J Jans (Belgium) J Vliegen | 6 | 6
