= 2026 Olbia Challenger =

- Date: 12–18 October
- Edition: 4th
- Surface: Hard
- Location: Olbia, Italy

Champions

Singles
- (Bosnia and Herzegovina) Damir Džumhur

Doubles
- (Netherlands) Jarno Jans / (Belgium) Joran Vliegen
- Olbia Challenger

The 2026 Olbia Challenger was a professional tennis tournament played on hardcourts. It was the fourth edition of the tournament which was part of the 2026 ATP Challenger Tour. It took place in Olbia, Italy between 12 and 18 October 2026.

== Singles main-draw entrants ==
=== Seeds ===
Country	Player	Rank^{1}	Seed
GBR	Jacob Fearnley	96	1
BIH	Damir Džumhur	103	2
FRA	Valentin Royer	105	3
USA	Michael Mmoh	151	4
GER	Tom Gentzsch	164	5
ITA	Andrea Guerrieri	165	6
USA	Mackenzie McDonald	169	7
ITA	Francesco Maestrelli	171	8

- ^{1} Rankings are as of 5 October 2026.

=== Other entrants ===
The following players received wildcards into the singles main draw:

- (Italy) Lorenzo Carboni
- (Italy) Simone Massellani
- (Italy) Samuele Pieri

The following player received entry into the singles main draw using a protected ranking:

- (Tunisia) Aziz Dougaz

The following players received entry into the singles main draw as alternates:

- (Czech Republic) Hynek Bartoň
- (Romania) Cezar Crețu
- (Croatia) Mili Poljičak

The following players received entry from the qualifying draw:

- (Norway) Viktor Durasovic
- (France) Mathys Erhard
- (Ukraine) Georgii Kravchenko
- (Bulgaria) Dimitar Kuzmanov
- (United Kingdom) George Loffhagen
- (Netherlands) Niels Visker

The following player received entry as a lucky loser:

- (France) Laurent Lokoli

== Champions ==
=== Singles ===
- (Bosnia and Herzegovina) Damir Džumhur def. (United Kingdom) Jacob Fearnley 7–6^{(7–4)}, 6–3.

=== Doubles ===
- (Netherlands) Jarno Jans / (Belgium) Joran Vliegen def. (Israel) Daniel Cukierman / (Brazil) Fernando Romboli 6–3, 6–4.
