= Ugo Blanchet =

French tennis player (born 1999)

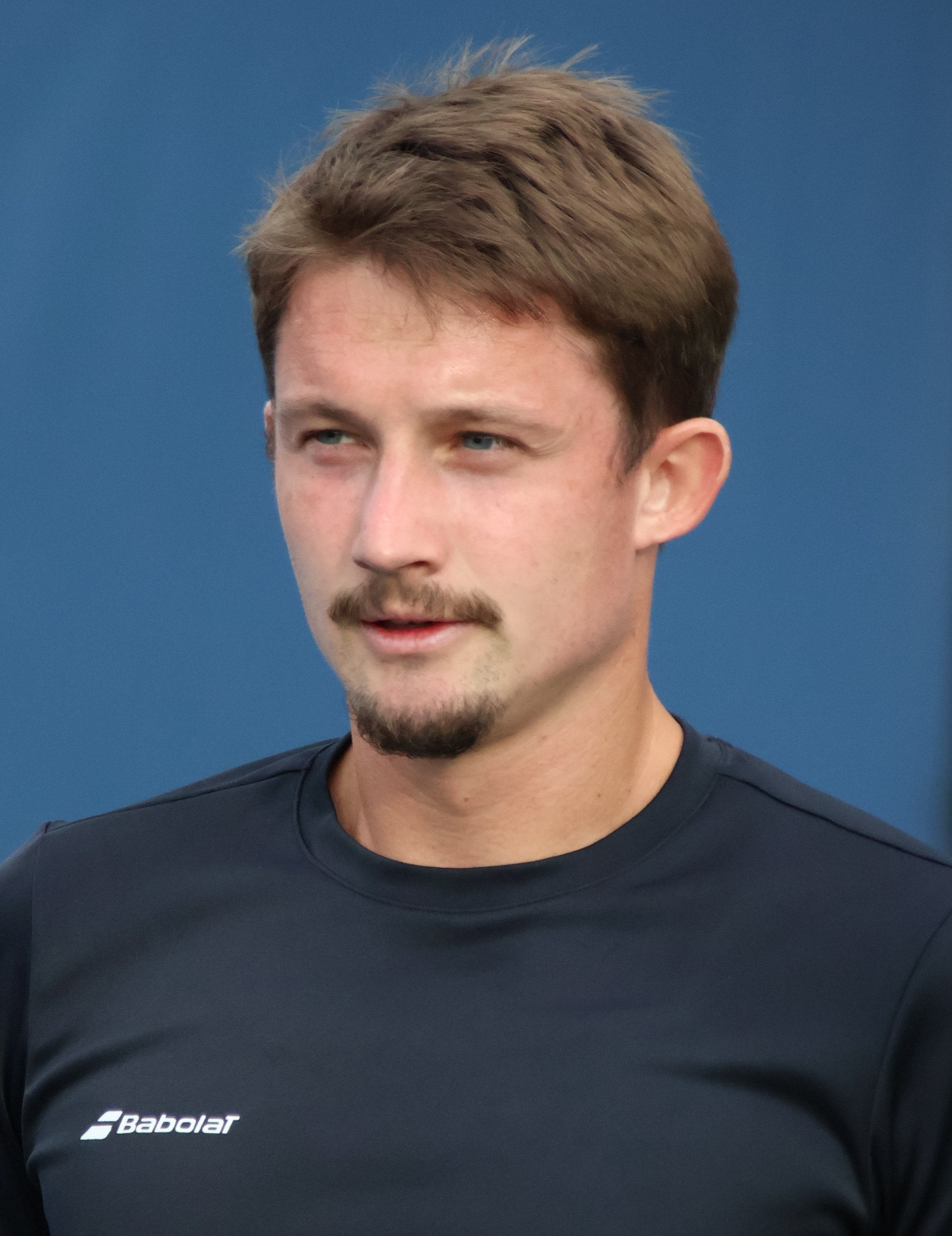
- Blanchet at the 2026 US Open
- Country (sports): France
- Born: 5 January 1999 (age 27) Saint-Julien-en-Genevois, France
- Height: 1.75 m (5 ft 9 in)
- Plays: Right-handed (two-handed backhand)
- Coach: Stéphane Robert
- Prize money: US $993,374

Singles
- Career record: 4–9 (at ATP Tour level, Grand Slam level, and in Davis Cup)
- Career titles: 0
- Highest ranking: No. 139 (30 September 2024)
- Current ranking: No. 199 (31 August 2026)

Grand Slam singles results
- Australian Open: Q1 (2024, 2025, 2026)
- French Open: 1R (2025)
- Wimbledon: Q2 (2025)
- US Open: 3R (2025)

Doubles
- Career record: 2–6 (at ATP Tour level, Grand Slam level, and in Davis Cup)
- Career titles: 0
- Highest ranking: No. 354 (14 October 2024)
- Current ranking: No. 563 (31 August 2026)

Grand Slam doubles results
- French Open: 1R (2025)
- Last updated on: 1 September 2026.

Ugo Blanchet (born 5 January 1999) is a French professional tennis player who plays mostly on the ATP Challenger Tour. He has a career high ATP singles ranking of world No. 139 achieved on 30 September 2024. He also has a career high ATP doubles ranking of No. 387 achieved on 15 July 2024.

== Professional career ==
=== 2022: ATP doubles debut ===
In February, Blanchet made his ATP Tour debut at the 2022 Open 13 in Marseille after receiving a wildcard into the doubles main draw with Timo Legout. The pair went on to reach the quarterfinals, earning Blanchet his first ATP Tour doubles win.

=== 2023: Maiden Challenger title, Top 200 debut ===
In October, Blanchet won his maiden Challenger title at the 2023 Málaga Open as a qualifier, defeating Mattia Bellucci in the final. In November, Blanchet recorded his second ATP career win in doubles at the 2023 Moselle Open, playing along with Matteo Martineau, after the pair received a wildcard to the main draw.

=== 2024: ATP singles debut and first win, Top 150 ===
In January, Blanchet made his singles debut on the ATP Tour as a qualifier at the 2024 Open Sud de France in Montpellier, losing to Grégoire Barrère in the first round.

In April, Blanchet reached his second career Challenger final in Oeiras, Portugal, losing to fourth seed Francisco Comesaña in the final.

In July, Blanchet won his first singles main draw match on the ATP Tour at the Hamburg Open as a qualifier, defeating Alexei Popyrin in the first round. As a result, he entered the top 150 in the singles rankings at No. 145 on 22 July 2024.

=== 2025: Masters, Major debut and third round ===
Blanchet won his second Challenger title at the Koblenz Challenger, defeating Luca Nardi in the final which went to a deciding set tiebreak.

In May, Blanchet made his Grand Slam main draw debut at the 2025 French Open as a qualifier. He lost to Hugo Gaston in the first round.

In July, Blanchet made his Masters 1000 debut as a qualifier at the 2025 Canada Open in Toronto. He lost in the first round to Roman Safiullin.

In August, ranked No. 184, Blanchet made his 2025 US Open debut as a qualifier, and recorded his first Grand Slam win by defeating Fábián Marozsán in the first round. He then defeated sixteenth seed Jakub Menšík, his first top 20 win, to reach a major third round for the first time. In September, Blanchet also made his debut as a qualifier at the 2025 Shanghai Masters.

== Performance timeline ==
Key
W	F	SF	QF	#R	RR	Q#	DNQ	A	NH

(W) winner; (F) finalist; (SF) semifinalist; (QF) quarterfinalist; (#R) rounds 4, 3, 2, 1; (RR) round-robin stage; (Q#) qualification round; (DNQ) did not qualify; (A) absent; (NH) not held; (SR) strike rate (events won / competed); (W–L) win–loss record.

=== Singles ===
Tournament	2024	2025	2026	SR	W–L	Win%
Grand Slam tournaments
Australian Open	Q1	Q1	Q1	0 / 0	0–0	–
French Open	Q2	1R		0 / 1	0–1	0%
Wimbledon	Q1	Q2		0 / 0	0–0	–
US Open	Q1	3R		0 / 1	2–1	67%
Win–loss	0–0	2–2	0–0	0 / 2	2–2	50%
ATP Masters 1000
Indian Wells Masters	A	A		0 / 0	0–0	–
Miami Open	A	A		0 / 0	0–0	–
Monte-Carlo Masters	A	A		0 / 0	0–0	–
Madrid Open	A	A		0 / 0	0–0	–
Italian Open	A	A		0 / 0	0–0	–
Canada Masters	A	1R		0 / 1	0–1	0%
Cincinnati Open	A	A		0 / 0	0–0	–
Shanghai Masters	Q1	1R		0 / 1	0–1	0%
Paris Masters	A	Q1		0 / 0	0–0	–
Win–loss	0–0	0–2	0–0	0 / 2	0–2	0%

== ATP Challenger Tour finals ==
=== Singles: 3 (2 titles, 1 runner-up) ===
Legend (singles) ATP Challenger Tour (2–1)	Finals by surface Hard (2–0) Clay (0–1)

Result	W–L	Date	Tournament	Tier	Surface	Opponent	Score
Win	1–0	Oct 2023	Malaga Open, Spain	Challenger	Hard	(Italy) Mattia Bellucci	6–4, 6–4
Loss	1–1	Apr 2024	Oeiras Open, Portugal	Challenger	Clay	(Argentina) Francisco Comesana	4–6, 6–3, 5–7
Win	2–1	Jan 2025	Koblenz Open, Germany	Challenger	Hard (i)	(Italy) Luca Nardi	6–3, 3–6, 7–6^{(7–5)}

== ITF World Tennis Tour finals ==
=== Singles: 10 (6 titles, 4 runner-ups) ===
Legend (singles) ITF Futures (6–4)	Finals by surface Hard (6–3) Clay (0–1)

Result	W–L	Date	Tournament	Tier	Surface	Opponent	Score
Win	1–0	Oct 2021	M15 Monastir, Tunisia	World Tennis Tour	Hard	(France) Quentin Folliot	4–6, 7–6^{(7–)}, 6–2
Loss	1–1	Oct 2021	M15 Monastir, Tunisia	World Tennis Tour	Hard	(Netherlands) Guy den Ouden	4–6, 2–6
Loss	1–2	Dec 2021	M15 Monastir, Tunisia	World Tennis Tour	Hard	(United Kingdom) Stuart Parker	2–6, 4–6
Win	2–2	Jan 2022	M15 Manacor, Spain	World Tennis Tour	Hard	(Switzerland) Antoine Bellier	6–3, 4–6, 7–6^{(7–2)}
Loss	2–3	Apr 2022	M25 Reus, Spain	World Tennis Tour	Clay	(Spain) Alex Marti Pujolras	6–3, 2–6, 6–7^{(3–7)}
Win	3–3	Jun 2022	M25 Bourg en Bresse, France	World Tennis Tour	Hard	(United States) Oliver Crawford	6–4, 7–6^{(7–4)}
Win	4–3	Jul 2022	M25 Uriage, France	World Tennis Tour	Hard	(France) Giovanni Mpetshi Perricard	6–2, 6–3
Win	5–3	Nov 2022	M25 Monastir, Tunisia	World Tennis Tour	Hard	(France) Kyrian Jacquet	4–6, 6–3, 6–2
Win	6–3	Jul 2023	M25 Uriage, France	World Tennis Tour	Hard	(Germany) Marvin Moeller	6–3, 6–4
Loss	6–4	Sep 2023	M25 Monastir, Tunisia	World Tennis Tour	Hard	(France) Robin Bertrand	2–6, 6–2, 4–6
