= Málaga Open =

- 2023 Málaga Open

ATP Challenger Tour
- Event name: Málaga Open
- Location: Málaga, Spain
- Category: ATP Challenger Tour
- Surface: Hard

The Málaga Open is a professional tennis tournament played on hard courts. It is currently part of the Association of Tennis Professionals (ATP) Challenger Tour. It is held in Málaga, Spain, with the first edition played in 2022.

== Past finals ==
=== Singles ===
Year	Champion	Runner-up	Score
2023	(France) Ugo Blanchet	(Italy) Mattia Bellucci	6–4, 6–4
2022	(France) Constant Lestienne	(Ecuador) Emilio Gómez	6–3, 5–7, 6–2

=== Doubles ===
Year	Champions	Runners-up	Score
2023	(United Kingdom) Julian Cash (United States) Robert Galloway	(Australia) Andrew Harris (Australia) John-Patrick Smith	7–5, 6–2
2022	(Turkey) Altuğ Çelikbilek (Kazakhstan) Dmitry Popko	(Israel) Daniel Cukierman (Ecuador) Emilio Gómez	6–7^{(4–7)}, 6–4, [10–6]
