= Joshua Paris =

British tennis player (born 1996)

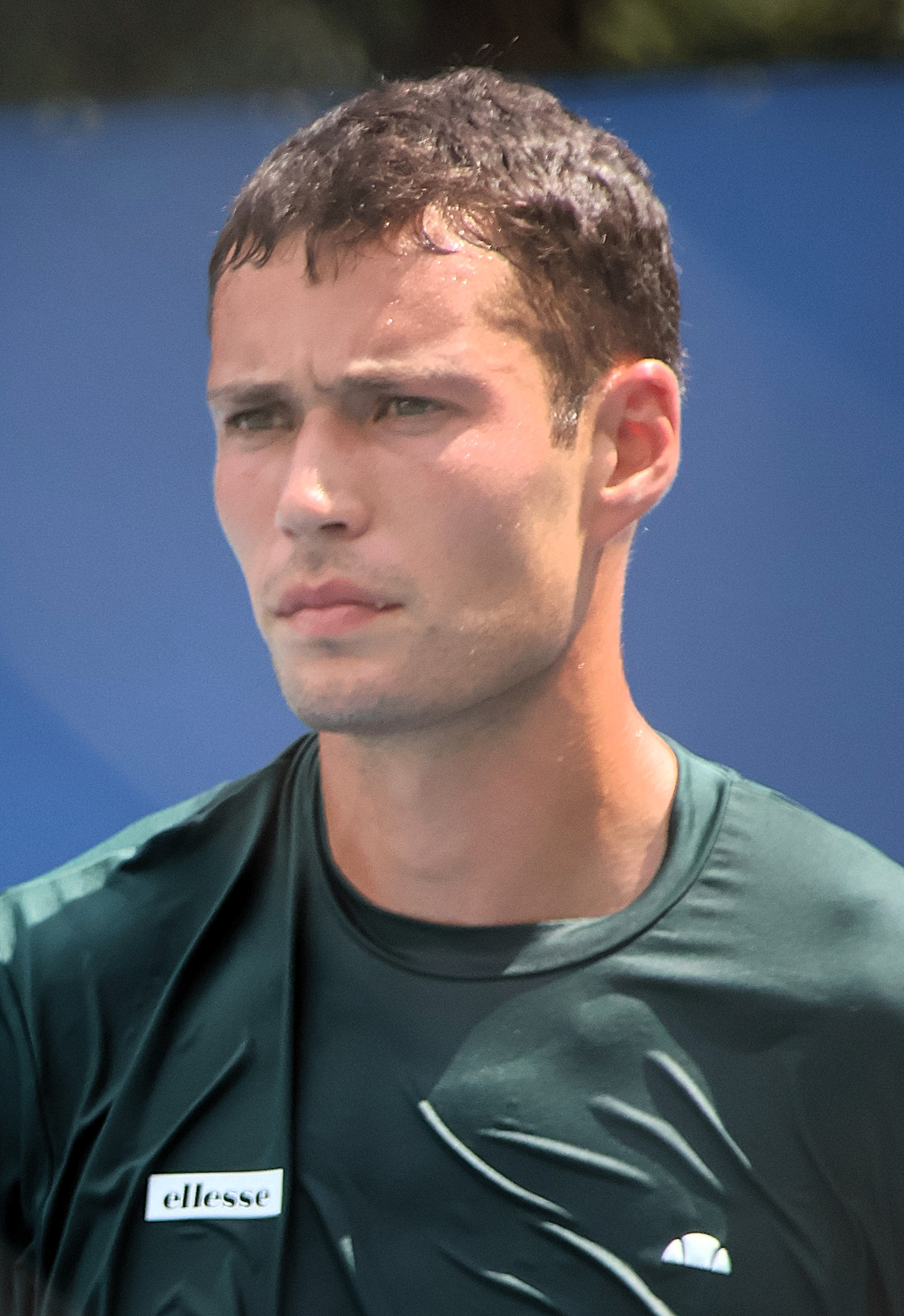
- Paris at the 2025 Washington Open
- Country (sports): United Kingdom
- Born: 6 March 1996 (age 30) London, United Kingdom
- Height: 1.88 m (6 ft 2 in)
- Plays: Right-handed (one-handed backhand)
- Prize money: US $171,340

Singles
- Career record: 0–0
- Highest ranking: No. 769 (5 August 2019)

Doubles
- Career record: 0–5
- Career titles: 5 Challenger, 5 Futures
- Highest ranking: No. 96 (24 November 2025)
- Current ranking: No. 98 (8 June 2025)

Grand Slam doubles results
- French Open: 1R (2026)
- Wimbledon: 1R (2025, 2026)
- US Open: 2R (2026)

Grand Slam mixed doubles results
- Wimbledon: QF (2025)
- Last updated on: 14 June 2026.

Joshua Paris (born 6 March 1996) is a British tennis player who specializes in doubles. Paris has a career high ATP doubles ranking of world No. 96 achieved on 24 November 2025. He competes mainly on the ATP Challenger Tour. He also has a career high singles ranking of No. 769 achieved in August 2019.

== Career ==
Paris has won his first ATP Challenger doubles title at the 2023 Rafa Nadal Open partnering with Daniel Cukierman, defeating Sriram Balaji and Ramkumar Ramanathan in the final. Playing with Eden Silva, he reached the mixed doubles quarterfinals at the 2025 Wimbledon Championships.

== Personal info ==
Paris is from Highgate, London and was educated at the Lycée Français Charles de Gaulle in South Kensington. He was part of the British squad at the 2013 Maccabiah Games.
