= Daniel Cukierman =

Israeli tennis player

Daniel Cukierman דניאל צוקרמן
- Country (sports): Israel
- Born: 9 July 1995 (age 31) Tel Aviv, Israel
- Height: 1.75 m (5 ft 9 in)
- Plays: Right-handed (two-handed backhand)
- Prize money: US $203,132

Singles
- Career record: 5–9 (at ATP Tour level, Grand Slam level, and in Davis Cup)
- Career titles: 0
- Highest ranking: No. 339 (29 May 2023)
- Current ranking: No. 1,374 (26 October 2026)

Doubles
- Career record: 8-8 (at ATP Tour level, Grand Slam level, and in Davis Cup)
- Career titles: 0
- Highest ranking: No. 114 (26 October 2026)
- Current ranking: No. 114 (26 October 2026)
- Last updated on: 26 October 2026.

Daniel Cukierman (Hebrew: דניאל צוקרמן; born 9 July 1995) is an Israeli tennis player. He has a career-high ATP doubles ranking of world No. 114 achieved on 26 October 2026 and a career-high singles ranking of No. 339 achieved on 29 May 2023.

During his junior year at the University of Southern California, Cukierman was ranked No. 1 in the US in singles among men's college tennis players in the 2019–20 Intercollegiate Tennis Association (ITA) Division I Men's Individual National Rankings.

== Early life ==
Cukierman was born in Tel Aviv, Israel, to Galia and businessman Edouard Cukierman (chairman of Cukierman & Co. Investment House). He has two brothers, Michael and Ariel. He attended Ironi Daled High School in Tel Aviv.

He was in the Israel Defense Forces for three years. After Cukierman was released from the IDF, Cukierman had a mandatory eight-month break from competition.

== College career ==
In 2017 Cukierman started his studies at the University of Southern California (USC), where he is playing for the USC Trojans tennis team. Cukierman said: "My feeling is to go to college, and after college, I can go pro and try my chances. And if it doesn’t work, I have my degree, so I’ll have other options. I feel like it’s better to start studying when you’re 22 (because I was in the Army) than when you’re 32." He began as an international relations major, and switched to real estate development.

In his freshman year in 2017–18 he was ranked No. 62 in the US in singles, and won All-Pac-12 Second Team honors. Cukierman went 16–5 in singles and 15–4 in doubles with Tanner Smith, and at the Intercollegiate Tennis Association (ITA) National Team Indoor Championships he was named to the All-Tournament Team at No. 3 doubles.

At the close of his sophomore year in 2018–19 Cukierman was ranked No. 21 in the US in singles, having reached No. 4 in singles and No. 21 in doubles rankings on February 6, 2019. He was named to All-Pac-12 First Team, and received Pac-12 All-Academic Honorable Mention. He went 34–11 in singles. In doubles, he was 26–11, playing again primarily with Tanner Smith. In October 2018, he won the Southern California Intercollegiate Singles title. He also won the Oracle ITA National Fall Singles Championship.

While team captain during his junior year, from November 13, 2019, until the close of competition in 2020, Cukierman was ranked No. 1 in the US in singles among men's college tennis players in the 2019–20 ITA Division I Men's Individual National Rankings. He was the first USC player to be ranked #1 in the nation since Steve Johnson in 2012. He was 26–2 in singles in 2019–20. He won the singles title and the doubles title (with Riley Smith) at the Sherwood Collegiate Cup in Thousand Oaks, California, and also won the Oracle Pro Series ITA Masters championships in singles and doubles (also with Smith). He and Smith ranked No. 5 in the US in doubles when competition was cancelled due to the COVID-19 pandemic in the United States. He was the Pac-12 Player of the Week on January 21 and February 18, 2020, and the UTR/ITA Player of the Week on February 18. He was named to the ITA National Team Indoor Championship All-Tournament team at No. 2 singles, and at No. 1 doubles with Smith. He was also named a 2020 ITA All-American.

== Professional career ==
When he was 18 years of age, Cukierman started training with Israeli Amos Mansdorf, and won an Israel championship. While in high school, he won the Israeli doubles title.

Cukierman reached the singles finals at the 2016 Greece F9 Futures, and the 2016 Israel F14 Futures and F13 Futures, and reached the doubles final at the 2016 Israel F15 Futures. In December 2017, he won the Israel National Championship in doubles. In December 2019, he won the Israel National Championship in singles.

In January 2020, partnering with Riley Smith, Cukierman won the M25 Los Angeles doubles championship.

== National representation ==
=== Davis Cup ===
Cukierman plays for the Israel Davis Cup team in the Davis Cup. He was first nominated to the team for the 2017 Davis Cup, and played in a match against Portuguese tennis player Frederico Ferreira Silva. In March 2020 he won both singles (defeating Cem Ilkel, ranked #195 in the world, 7–6(4), 6–2 and doubles (with Australian Open doubles champion Jonathan Erlich; defeating Yanki Erel and Ilkel, 6–3, 6–1) matches against Turkey at the Davis Cup Group 1 qualifiers in Antalya, Turkey.

== Performance timeline ==
Key
| W | F | SF | QF | #R | RR | Q# | DNQ | A | NH |

(W) winner; (F) finalist; (SF) semifinalist; (QF) quarterfinalist; (#R) rounds 4, 3, 2, 1; (RR) round-robin stage; (Q#) qualification round; (DNQ) did not qualify; (A) absent; (NH) not held; (SR) strike rate (events won / competed); (W–L) win–loss record.
To avoid confusion and double counting, these charts are updated at the conclusion of a tournament or when the player's participation has ended.

=== Doubles ===
| Tournament | 2025 | SR | W–L | Win % |
|---|---|---|---|---|
Grand Slam tournaments
| Australian Open | A | 0 / 0 | 0–0 | – |
| French Open | A | 0 / 0 | 0–0 | – |
| Wimbledon | A | 0 / 0 | 0–0 | – |
| US Open | A | 0 / 0 | 0–0 | – |
| Win–loss | 0–0 | 0 / 0 | 0–0 | – |
ATP Masters 1000
| Indian Wells Masters | A | 0 / 0 | 0–0 | – |
| Miami Open | A | 0 / 0 | 0–0 | – |
| Monte Carlo Masters | A | 0 / 0 | 0–0 | – |
| Madrid Open | A | 0 / 0 | 0-0 | – |
| Italian Open | A | 0 / 0 | 0–0 | – |
| Canadian Open | A | 0 / 0 | 0–0 | – |
| Cincinnati Masters | A | 0 / 0 | 0–0 | – |
| Shanghai Masters | A | 0 / 0 | 0–0 | – |
| Paris Masters | R2 | 0 / 1 | 0–1 | 0% |
| Win–loss | 0–1 | 0 / 1 | 0–1 | 0% |

== ATP Challenger and ITF Tour finals ==
=== Singles: 10 (3–7) ===
| Legend (singles) ATP Challenger Tour (0–0) Futures/ITF World Tennis Tour (3–7) | Finals by surface Hard (3–5) Clay (0–2) |

| Result | W–L | Date | Tournament | Tier | Surface | Opponent | Score |
|---|---|---|---|---|---|---|---|
| Loss | 0–1 | Sep 2016 | Israel F13, Kiryat Gat | Futures | Hard | (United States) Austin Smith | 1–6, 2–6 |
| Loss | 0–2 | Oct 2016 | Israel F14, Meitar | Futures | Hard | (Russia) Roman Safiullin | 0–6, 4–6 |
| Loss | 0–3 | Nov 2016 | Greece F9, Heraklion | Futures | Hard | (Spain) Carlos Gómez-Herrera | 2–6, 2–6 |
| Loss | 0–4 | Aug 2019 | M25, Roehampton, United Kingdom | World Tennis Tour | Hard | (United States) Eric Quigley | 6–4, 3–6, 2–6 |
| Loss | 0–5 | Jul 2021 | M25, Belgrade, Serbia | World Tennis Tour | Clay | (Dominican Republic) Nick Hardt | 6–3, 3–6, 3–6 |
| Win | 1–5 | May 2022 | M15, Akko, Israel | World Tennis Tour | Hard | (Israel) Ben Patael | 7–5, 6–2 |
| Win | 2–5 | May 2022 | M25, Netanya, Israel | World Tennis Tour | Hard | (Israel) Kyle Seelig | 6–1, 6–2 |
| Win | 3–5 | Oct 2022 | M25, Afula, Israel | World Tennis Tour | Hard | (Poland) Filip Peliwo | 7–6^{(7–4)}, 6–3 |
| Loss | 3–6 | Nov 2022 | M25, Heraklion, Greece | World Tennis Tour | Hard | (France) Térence Atmane | 3–6, 6–2, 4–6 |
| Loss | 3–7 | May 2023 | M25, Gurb, Spain | World Tennis Tour | Clay | (Spain) David Jordà Sanchis | 3–6, 1–6 |

=== Doubles: 40 (21-19) ===
| Legend (singles) ATP Challenger Tour (5–12) Futures/ITF World Tennis Tour (16–7) | Finals by surface Hard (15–13) Clay (6–6) |

| Result | W–L | Date | Tournament | Tier | Surface | Partner | Opponents | Score |
|---|---|---|---|---|---|---|---|---|
| Win | 1-0 | May 2015 | Israel F5, Ashkelon | Futures | Hard | (Israel) Edan Leshem | (Republic of Ireland) Sam Barry (Russia) Evgeny Karlovskiy | 7-5, 7–5 |
| Loss | 1-1 | May 2015 | Israel F6, Akko | Futures | Hard | (Israel) Dekel Bar | (Republic of Ireland) Sam Barry (United Kingdom) Toby Martin | 3-6, 5–7 |
| Loss | 1-2 | May 2016 | Israel F7, Tel Aviv | Futures | Hard | (Israel) Edan Leshem | (United States) Nicolas Meister (United States) Hunter Reese | 5-7, 5–7 |
| Win | 2-2 | Oct 2016 | Israel F6, Ramat Hasharon | Futures | Hard | (United Kingdom) Scott Clayton | (Israel) Shahar Elbaz (Ukraine) Volodymyr Uzhylovskyi | 6-4, 6–3 |
| Win | 3-2 | Jun 2018 | Israel F8, Tel Aviv | Futures | Hard | (Israel) Edan Leshem | (France) Dan Added (France) Albano Olivetti | 6-4, 6–2 |
| Win | 4-2 | Jul 2019 | M25, Porto, Portugal | World Tennis Tour | Hard | (Slovakia) Martin Beran | (Portugal) Francisco Dias (Portugal) Goncalo Falcao | 7–6^{(8–6)}, 7–5 |
| Win | 5-2 | Jan 2020 | M25, Los Angeles, USA | World Tennis Tour | Hard | (United States) Riley Smith | (Switzerland) Sandro Ehrat (United States) Brandon Holt | 7–6^{(7–4)}, 7–6^{(7–5)} |
| Loss | 5-3 | Jul 2021 | M25, Belgrade, Serbia | World Tennis Tour | Clay | (United States) Andrew Fenty | (Italy) Giovanni Oradini (Serbia) Strahinja Rakic | 3-6, 6–4, [7-10] |
| Win | 6-3 | Sep 2021 | M25, Johannesburg, South Africa | World Tennis Tour | Hard | (United Kingdom) Alastair Gray | (Brazil) Mateus Alves (Brazil) Igor Marcondes | 7–6^{(7–5)}, 6–3 |
| Loss | 6-4 | Nov 2021 | M25, Afula, Israel | World Tennis Tour | Hard | (France) Dan Added | (Israel) Lior Goldenberg (Israel) Sahar Simon | 6-7^{(7–9)}, 6–2, [7-10] |
| Win | 7-4 | Dec 2021 | M15, Antalya, Turkey | World Tennis Tour | Clay | (Lithuania) Tadas Babelis | (Turkey) Berk Ilkel (Turkey) S Mert Ozdemir | 6-3, 6-7^{(4–7)}, [10-4] |
| Loss | 7-5 | Mar 2022 | M25, Bakersfield, USA | World Tennis Tour | Hard | (South Africa) Ruan Roelofse | (South Korea) Nam Ji-sung (South Korea) Song Min-kyu | 2-6, 0–6 |
| Win | 8-5 | May 2022 | M25, Ulcinj, Romania | World Tennis Tour | Clay | (Romania) Cezar Cretu | (Croatia) Mili Poljičak (Serbia) Stefan Popovic | 6-4, 6–1 |
| Win | 9-5 | May 2022 | M25, Prague, Czech Republic | World Tennis Tour | Clay | (Australia) Andrew Harris | (Czech Republic) Filip Duda (Germany) Peter Heller | 6-0, 6–3 |
| Win | 10-5 | May 2022 | M15, Akko, Israel | World Tennis Tour | Hard | (Israel) Edan Leshem | (United Kingdom) Giles Hussey (United Kingdom) Daniel Little | 6-3, 6–4 |
| Loss | 10-6 | Jul 2022 | Malaga, Spain | Challenger | Hard | (Ecuador) Emilio Gomez | (Turkey) Altug Celikbilek (Kazakhstan) Dmitry Popko | 7–6^{(7–4)}, 4–6, [6-10] |
| Win | 11-6 | Oct 2022 | M25, Glasgow, United Kingdom | World Tennis Tour | Hard | (United Kingdom) Giles Hussey | (United Kingdom) Anton Matusevich (United Kingdom) Joshua Paris | 6-7^{(3–7)}, 6–4, [10-8] |
| Win | 12-6 | Oct 2022 | M25, Afula, Israel | World Tennis Tour | Hard | (United Kingdom) Joshua Paris | (Ukraine) Vladyslav Orlov (Ukraine) Eric Vanshelboim | 6-3, 6–3 |
| Win | 13-6 | Nov 2022 | M25, Jerusalem, Israel | World Tennis Tour | Hard | (United Kingdom) Joshua Paris | (Poland) Filip Peliwo (United Kingdom) Mattias Southcombe | 6-3, 6–4 |
| Loss | 13-7 | Nov 2022 | M25, Heraklion, Greece | World Tennis Tour | Hard | (Ukraine) Volodymyr Uzhylovskyi | (Austria) Neil Oberleitner (Germany) Tim Sandkaulen | 2-6, 6-7^{(5–7)} |
| Win | 14-7 | Jan 2023 | M25, Sunderland, United Kingdom | World Tennis Tour | Hard | (Israel) Edan Leshem | (United Kingdom) Anton Matusevich (United Kingdom) Joshua Paris | 2-6, 6–1, [10-3] |
| Win | 15-7 | May 2023 | M25, Gurb, Spain | World Tennis Tour | Clay | (Argentina) Mariano Kestelboim | (Greece) Dimitris Sakellaridis (Greece) Stefanos Sakellaridis | 6-3, 6–3 |
| Win | 16-7 | Jun 2023 | M25, Netanya, Israel | World Tennis Tour | Hard | (Israel) Edan Leshem | (United States) Trey Hilderbrand (United States) Noah Schachter | 6-3, 6–3 |
| Loss | 16-8 | Jul 2023 | M25, Netanya, Israel | World Tennis Tour | Hard | (Israel) Edan Leshem | (United States) Trey Hilderbrand (United States) Noah Schachter | W/O |
| Win | 17-8 | Sep 2023 | Mallorca, Spain | Challenger | Hard | (United Kingdom) Joshua Paris | (India) Sriram Balaji (India) Ramkumar Ramanathan | 6-4, 6–4 |
| Win | 18-8 | Apr 2024 | Florianópolis, Brazil | Challenger | Clay | (Spain) Carlos Sanchez Jover | (Argentina) Lorenzo Joaquín Rodríguez (Uruguay) Franco Roncadelli | 6-0, 3–6, [10-4] |
| Loss | 18-9 | Aug 2024 | Grodzisk Mazowiecki, Poland | Challenger | Hard | (Denmark) Johannes Ingildsen | (United Kingdom) Charles Broom (United Kingdom) David Stevenson | 3-6, 6-7^{(5–7)} |
| Win | 19-9 | Aug 2024 | Porto, Portugal | Challenger | Clay | (Poland) Piotr Matuszewski | (Monaco) Romain Arneodo (France) Théo Arribagé | 6-4, 6–0 |
| Loss | 19-10 | Oct 2024 | Braga, Portugal | Challenger | Clay | (Italy) Marco Bortolotti | (France) Théo Arribagé (Portugal) Francisco Cabral | 3-6, 4–6 |
| Loss | 19-11 | Jan 2025 | Nonthaburi, Thailand | Challenger | Hard | (United Kingdom) Joshua Paris | (Chinese Taipei) Ray Ho (Austria) Neil Oberleitner | 4-6, 6-7^{(5–7)} |
| Loss | 19-12 | Feb 2025 | Tenerife, Spain | Challenger | Hard | (United Kingdom) Joshua Paris | (Peru) Alexander Merino (Germany) Christoph Negritu | 6-2, 3–6, [8-10] |
| Win | 20-12 | Feb 2025 | Glasgow, United Kingdom | Challenger | Hard | (United Kingdom) Joshua Paris | (United States) Vasil Kirkov (United Kingdom) Marcus Willis | 5-7, 6–4, [12-10] |
| Loss | 20-13 | Aug 2025 | Todi, Italy | Challenger | Clay | (Denmark) Johannes Ingildsen | (Italy) Filippo Romano (Italy) Jacopo Vasamì | 4-6, 3–6 |
| Loss | 20-14 | Aug 2025 | Como, Italy | Challenger | Clay | (Denmark) Johannes Ingildsen | (Romania) Victor Vlad Cornea (Argentina) Santiago Rodríguez Taverna | 3-6, 2–6 |
| Loss | 20-15 | Oct 2025 | Valencia, Spain | Challenger | Clay | (Spain) Inigo Cervantes | (Brazil) Marcelo Demoliner (Brazil) Orlando Luz | 3-6, 6–3, [5-10] |
| Win | 21-15 | Jan 2026 | Nonthaburi, Thailand | Challenger | Hard | (Austria) Joel Schwärzler | (Chinese Taipei) Hsieh Cheng-peng (Chinese Taipei) Huang Tsung-hao | 6-3, 6–1 |
| Loss | 21-16 | Mar 2026 | Cap Cana, Dominican Republic | Challenger | Hard | (United States) Trey Hilderbrand | (Monaco) Romain Arneodo (Brazil) Marcelo Demoliner | 6–7^{(2–7)}, 6–3, [6–10] |
| Loss | 21-17 | Jul 2026 | Bunschoten, Netherlands | Challenger | Clay | (Romania) Victor Cornea | (Belgium) Joran Vliegen (Netherlands) Andrew Paulson | 6–7^{(5–7)}, 2–6 |
| Loss | 21-18 | Oct 2026 | Villena, Spain | Challenger | Hard | (Brazil) Fernando Romboli | (United States) Benjamin Kittay (Japan) Takeru Yuzuki | 4–6, 7–5, [7–10] |
| Loss | 21–19 | Oct 2026 | Olbia, Italy | Challenger | Hard | (Brazil) Fernando Romboli | (Netherlands) Jarno Jans (Belgium) Joran Vliegen | 3–6, 4–6 |
