= Samsun Open =

Tennis tournament in Turkey

- 2026 Samsun Open

Tournament information
- Event name: Samsun Open
- Location: Samsun, Turkey
- Venue: Green Golf & Tennis Club
- Surface: Hard
- Draw: 32S/16Q/16D

Current champions (2026)
- Men's singles: (France) Gabriel Debru
- Women's singles: (Turkey) Ayla Aksu
- Men's doubles: (United States) Christopher Papa (China) Zheng Baoluo
- Women's doubles: Elena Pridankina; Anastasia Tikhonova
ATP Tour
- Category: ATP Challenger Tour
- Prize money: $63,000
WTA Tour
- Category: WTA 125
- Prize money: $115,000

The Samsun Open is a tournament for professional tennis players played on outdoor hard courts. The event is classified as a WTA 125 tournament and an ATP Challenger tournament and is held at the Green Golf & Tennis Club in Samsun, Turkey.

== Past finals ==
=== Women's singles ===
Year	Champion	Runners-up	Score
2026	(Turkey) Ayla Aksu	(Italy) Lucrezia Stefanini	7–5, 2–6, 6–2
2025	(Slovenia) Kaja Juvan	(Czech Republic) Nikola Bartůňková	7–6^{(10–8)}, 6–3

=== Men's singles ===
Year	Champion	Runners-up	Score
2026	(France) Gabriel Debru	(France) Constantin Bittoun Kouzmine	3–6, 7–5, 6–4

=== Women's doubles ===
Year	Champions	Runners-up	Score
2026	Elena Pridankina; Anastasia Tikhonova	(India) Rutuja Bhosale (Australia) Elena Micic	7–6^{(7–5)}, 6–7^{(7–9)}, [10–3]
2025	(Switzerland) Naïma Karamoko (France) Tiantsoa Rakotomanga Rajaonah	(United Kingdom) Harriet Dart (United Kingdom) Maia Lumsden	7–5, 1–6, [10–6]

=== Men's doubles ===
Year	Champions	Runners-up	Score
2026	(United States) Christopher Papa (China) Zheng Baoluo	(France) Dan Added (France) Gabriel Debru	6–4, 6–7^{(2–7)}, [13–11]
