= 2024 Città di Como Challenger – Singles =

Singles
- 2024 Città di Como Challenger

Final
- Champion: (France) Gabriel Debru
- Runner-up: (Peru) Ignacio Buse
- Score: 6–1, 2–6, 6–3

Events
Singles	Doubles
← 2023 ·	Città di Como Challenger	· 2025 →

Thiago Seyboth Wild was the defending champion but chose not to defend his title.

Gabriel Debru won the title after defeating Ignacio Buse 6–1, 2–6, 6–3 in the final.

== Seeds ==
1. (Slovakia) Jozef Kovalík (first round)
2. (Italy) Stefano Napolitano (first round)
3. (Brazil) Gustavo Heide (first round)
4. (Italy) Francesco Passaro (second round)
5. (Peru) Juan Pablo Varillas (withdrew)
6. (Kazakhstan) Dmitry Popko (first round)
7. (Lebanon) Benjamin Hassan (first round)
8. (Hungary) Zsombor Piros (quarterfinals)

== Draw ==
=== Key ===
- Q = Qualifier
- WC = Wild card
- LL = Lucky loser
- Alt = Alternate
- ITF = ITF entry
- PR = Protected ranking
- SR = Special ranking
- SE = Special exempt
- JE = Junior exempt
- JR = Junior Accelerator Programme entrant
- CO = College Accelerator Programme entrant
- NG = Next Gen Accelerator Program entrant
- w/o = Walkover
- r = Retired
- d = Defaulted

=== Finals ===
Semifinals
(France) Gabriel Debru	7^{7}	6
(Italy) Stefano Travaglia	6^{4}	3
Alt	(Slovakia) Alex Molčan	6	2	2
(Peru) Ignacio Buse	4	6	6

Final
(France) Gabriel Debru	6	2	6
(Peru) Ignacio Buse	1	6	3

=== Top half ===
First round
1	(Slovakia) J Kovalík	2	6	4
Q	(Georgia (country)) N Basilashvili	6	2	6
PR	(Japan) K Nishikori	6	6
(Italy) Samuel Vincent Ruggeri	2	1
(Romania) FC Jianu	7	1	6
Q	Svyatoslav Gulin	5	6	4
(France) G Debru	6	7^{7}
7	(Lebanon) B Hassan	2	6^{5}
4	(Italy) F Passaro	6	4	6
(Slovenia) Filip Jeff Planinšek	2	6	4
Q	(Germany) MH Rehberg	3	6^{3}
(Argentina) GA Olivieri	6	7^{7}
WC	(Italy) F Bondioli	7	6
Q	(Ukraine) V Sachko	5	2
(Italy) S Travaglia	6	7^{7}
6	(Kazakhstan) D Popko	2	6^{3}

Second round
Q	(Georgia (country)) N Basilashvili	1	1^{r}
PR	(Japan) K Nishikori	6	3
(Romania) FC Jianu	6^{5}	2
(France) G Debru	7^{7}	6
4	(Italy) F Passaro	6	4	4
(Argentina) GA Olivieri	4	6	6
WC	(Italy) F Bondioli	2	4
(Italy) S Travaglia	6	6

Quarterfinals
PR	(Japan) K Nishikori
(France) G Debru	w/o
(Argentina) GA Olivieri	6	5	1
(Italy) S Travaglia	3	7	6

Semifinals
(France) G Debru	7^{7}	6
(Italy) S Travaglia	6^{4}	3

=== Bottom half ===
First round
8	(Hungary) Z Piros	6	7^{7}
(Peru) G Bueno	1	6^{2}
WC	(Italy) R Brancaccio	4	7^{8}	6
Q	(Brazil) M Pucinelli de Almeida	6	6^{6}	2
(Switzerland) R Bertola	3
(France) B Paire	2^{r}
Alt	(Slovakia) A Molčan	6	6
3	(Brazil) G Heide	2	2
LL	(Italy) Alexander Weis	4	6	4
(Austria) F Misolic	6	3	6
WC	(Italy) M Cecchinato	4	1
(Peru) I Buse	6	6
Q	(Argentina) V Aboian	6	7
(Italy) F Arnaboldi	4	5
Alt	(Czech Republic) A Paulson	7^{7}	4	6
2	(Italy) S Napolitano	6^{4}	6	3

Second round
8	(Hungary) Z Piros	6	6
WC	(Italy) R Brancaccio	4	3
(Switzerland) R Bertola	5	6	2
Alt	(Slovakia) A Molčan	7	3	6
(Austria) F Misolic	4	2
(Peru) I Buse	6	6
Q	(Argentina) V Aboian	6	6
Alt	(Czech Republic) A Paulson	2	1

Quarterfinals
8	(Hungary) Z Piros	7^{7}	3	2
Alt	(Slovakia) A Molčan	6^{4}	6	6
(Peru) I Buse	4	6	6
Q	(Argentina) V Aboian	6	4	1

Semifinals
Alt	(Slovakia) A Molčan	6	2	2
(Peru) I Buse	4	6	6
