= 2023 Città di Como Challenger – Doubles =

Doubles
- 2023 Città di Como Challenger

Final
- Champions: (Germany) Constantin Frantzen (Germany) Hendrik Jebens
- Runners-up: (Sweden) Filip Bergevi (Netherlands) Mick Veldheer
- Score: 6–3, 6–4

Events
Singles	Doubles
← 2022 ·	Città di Como Challenger	· 2024 →

Alexander Erler and Lucas Miedler were the defending champions but chose not to defend their title.

Constantin Frantzen and Hendrik Jebens won the title after defeating Filip Bergevi and Mick Veldheer 6–3, 6–4 in the final.

== Seeds ==
1. (Germany) Constantin Frantzen / (Germany) Hendrik Jebens (champions)
2. (Czech Republic) Roman Jebavý / (Czech Republic) Petr Nouza (semifinals)
3. Ivan Liutarevich / (Ukraine) Vladyslav Manafov (quarterfinals)
4. (Serbia) Ivan Sabanov / (Serbia) Matej Sabanov (quarterfinals)

== Draw ==
=== Key ===
- Q = Qualifier
- WC = Wild card
- LL = Lucky loser
- Alt = Alternate
- SE = Special exempt
- PR = Protected ranking
- ITF = ITF entry
- JE = Junior exempt
- w/o = Walkover
- r = Retired
- d = Defaulted
- SR = Special ranking

First round
1	(Germany) C Frantzen (Germany) H Jebens	7	7^{7}
WC	(Italy) A Arnaboldi (Italy) L Rottoli	5	6^{4}
(Italy) S Caruso (Italy) G Fonio	6^{4}	6	[5]
(Italy) M Bortolotti (Romania) A Jecan	7^{7}	4	[10]
3	I Liutarevich (Ukraine) V Manafov	6	7^{8}
(Switzerland) L Margaroli (Argentina) S Rodríguez Taverna	3	6^{6}
(Croatia) Z Babić (Bulgaria) A Donski	7^{8}	5	[10]
(France) C Bittoun Kouzmine (Ukraine) V Uzhylovskyi	6^{6}	7	[7]
(Sweden) F Bergevi (Netherlands) M Veldheer	w/o
(Bulgaria) D Kuzmanov (Netherlands) J Sels
(France) M Martineau (Hungary) Z Piros	3	2
4	(Serbia) I Sabanov (Serbia) M Sabanov	6	6
Alt	(Italy) F Agamenone (Italy) L Darderi	6	4	[10]
WC	(Italy) Emanuele De Sanctis (Italy) F Fognini	0	6	[2]
Alt	(Portugal) J Faria (Portugal) H Rocha	6	4	[6]
2	(Czech Republic) R Jebavý (Czech Republic) P Nouza	1	6	[10]

Quarterfinals
1	(Germany) C Frantzen (Germany) H Jebens	6	6
(Italy) M Bortolotti (Romania) A Jecan	3	4
3	I Liutarevich (Ukraine) V Manafov	4	4
(Croatia) Z Babić (Bulgaria) A Donski	6	6
(Sweden) F Bergevi (Netherlands) M Veldheer	6	6
4	(Serbia) I Sabanov (Serbia) M Sabanov	4	4
Alt	(Italy) F Agamenone (Italy) L Darderi	2	3
2	(Czech Republic) R Jebavý (Czech Republic) P Nouza	6	6

Semifinals
1	(Germany) C Frantzen (Germany) H Jebens	6^{4}	6	[10]
(Croatia) Z Babić (Bulgaria) A Donski	7^{7}	3	[3]
(Sweden) F Bergevi (Netherlands) M Veldheer	6	2	[10]
2	(Czech Republic) R Jebavý (Czech Republic) P Nouza	3	6	[7]

Final
1	(Germany) C Frantzen (Germany) H Jebens	6	6
(Sweden) F Bergevi (Netherlands) M Veldheer	3	4
