= 2026 Samsun Open – Men's doubles =

Men's doubles
- 2026 Samsun Open

Final
- Champions: (United States) Christopher Papa (China) Zheng Baoluo
- Runners-up: (France) Dan Added (France) Gabriel Debru
- Score: 6–4, 6–7^{(2–7)}, [13–11]

Events
Singles	men	women
Doubles	men	women
- Samsun Open

This was the first edition of the tournament.

Christopher Papa and Zheng Baoluo won the title after defeating Dan Added and Gabriel Debru 6–4, 6–7^{(2–7)}, [13–11] in the final.

== Seeds ==
1. (Turkey) Arda Azkara / (United Kingdom) James MacKinlay (semifinals)
2. (Brazil) Luís Britto / (Brazil) Natan Rodrigues (first round)
3. (France) Constantin Bittoun Kouzmine / (Kazakhstan) Grigoriy Lomakin (first round)
4. (Japan) Shunsuke Nakagawa / (Japan) Naoki Tajima (first round)

== Draw ==
Key

- Q = Qualifier
- WC = Wild card
- LL = Lucky loser
- Alt = Alternate
- ITF = ITF entry
- PR = Protected ranking
- SR = Special ranking
- SE = Special exempt
- JE = Junior exempt
- JR = Junior Accelerator Programme entrant
- CO = College Accelerator Programme entrant
- NG = Next Gen Accelerator Program entrant
- w/o = Walkover
- r = Retired
- d = Defaulted

First round
1	(Turkey) A Azkara (United Kingdom) J MacKinlay	6	7^{7}
(India) Sai Karteek Reddy Ganta (Japan) Koki Matsuda	3	6^{4}
(Bosnia and Herzegovina) M Baśić (Japan) Takuya Kumasaka	1	6	[8]
(Turkey) S Mert Özdemir (Turkey) MN Türker	6	3	[10]
3	(France) C Bittoun Kouzmine (Kazakhstan) G Lomakin	5	1
PR	(France) D Added (France) G Debru	7	6
S Betov (India) K Singh	6	6
WC	(Turkey) K Kırcı (Turkey) E Kırkın	3	3
(Italy) A Binda (United States) Maxwell McKennon	5	3
(Cyprus) E Neos; Semen Pankin	7	6
(India) J Nedunchezhiyan (China) A Wang	6	6^{4}	[10]
4	(Japan) S Nakagawa (Japan) N Tajima	4	7^{7}	[8]
(United States) C Papa (China) B Zheng	6	7^{7}
(Australia) Je Delaney (Northern Mariana Islands) C Sinclair	4	6^{5}
WC	(Turkey) Mert Alkaya (Turkey) T Duran	6^{4}	6	[12]
2	(Brazil) L Britto (Brazil) Natan Rodrigues	7^{7}	3	[10]

Quarterfinals
1	(Turkey) A Azkara (United Kingdom) J MacKinlay	7	6
(Turkey) SM Özdemir (Turkey) MN Türker	5	3
PR	(France) D Added (France) G Debru	6^{3}	6	[10]
S Betov (India) K Singh	7^{7}	2	[7]
(Cyprus) E Neos; S Pankin	6	6
(India) J Nedunchezhiyan (China) A Wang	3	2
(United States) C Papa (China) B Zheng	6	7^{7}
WC	(Turkey) M Alkaya (Turkey) T Duran	3	6^{3}

Semifinals
1	(Turkey) A Azkara (United Kingdom) J MacKinlay	2	1
PR	(France) D Added (France) G Debru	6	6
(Cyprus) E Neos; S Pankin	4	2
(United States) C Papa (China) B Zheng	6	6

Final
PR	(France) D Added (France) G Debru	4	7^{7}	[11]
(United States) C Papa (China) B Zheng	6	6^{2}	[13]
