= 2023 Città di Como Challenger =

- Date: 28 August – 3 September
- Edition: 17th
- Surface: Clay
- Location: Como, Italy

Champions

Singles
- (Brazil) Thiago Seyboth Wild

Doubles
- (Germany) Constantin Frantzen / (Germany) Hendrik Jebens
← 2022 ·	Città di Como Challenger	· 2024 →

The 2023 Città di Como Challenger was a professional tennis tournament played on clay courts. It was the 17th edition of the tournament which was part of the 2023 ATP Challenger Tour. It took place in Como, Italy between 28 August and 3 September 2023.

== Singles main-draw entrants ==
=== Seeds ===
Country	Player	Rank^{1}	Seed
BRA	Thiago Seyboth Wild	107	1
HUN	Zsombor Piros	113	2
BRA	Thiago Monteiro	115	3
FRA	Benoît Paire	125	4
ESP	Pedro Martínez	131	5
ITA	Flavio Cobolli	138	6
ITA	Fabio Fognini	140	7
	Ivan Gakhov	162	8

- ^{1} Rankings are as of 21 August 2023.

=== Other entrants ===
The following players received wildcards into the singles main draw:

- (Italy) Lorenzo Carboni
- (Italy) Fabio Fognini
- (Italy) Stefano Napolitano

The following players received entry into the singles main draw as alternates:

- (Italy) Luciano Darderi
- (Austria) Lukas Neumayer
- (Spain) Nikolás Sánchez Izquierdo

The following players received entry from the qualifying draw:

- (France) Mathias Bourgue
- (France) Calvin Hemery
- (France) Valentin Royer
- (Italy) Samuel Vincent Ruggeri
- (Germany) Louis Wessels
- (Serbia) Miljan Zekić

== Champions ==
=== Singles ===
- (Brazil) Thiago Seyboth Wild def. (Spain) Pedro Martínez 5–7, 6–2, 6–3.

=== Doubles ===
- (Germany) Constantin Frantzen / (Germany) Hendrik Jebens def. (Sweden) Filip Bergevi / (Netherlands) Mick Veldheer 6–3, 6–4.
