= 2020 Chile Open – Doubles =

Tennis tournament - men's doubles

Doubles
- 2020 Chile Open

Final
- Champions: (Spain) Roberto Carballés Baena (Spain) Alejandro Davidovich Fokina
- Runners-up: (El Salvador) Marcelo Arévalo (United Kingdom) Jonny O'Mara
- Score: 7–6^{(7–3)}, 6–1

Events
| Singles | Doubles |
- Chile Open

Roberto Carballés Baena and Alejandro Davidovich Fokina defeated Marcelo Arévalo and Jonny O'Mara in the final, 7–6^{(7–3)}, 6–1 to win the doubles tennis title at the 2020 Chile Open. It was both players' first ATP Tour title in doubles.

Oliver Marach and Florin Mergea were the reigning champions from 2014, the last time the tournament was held, but they chose not to participate this year.

== Seeds ==
1. (Brazil) Marcelo Demoliner / (Netherlands) Matwé Middelkoop (quarterfinals)
2. (El Salvador) Marcelo Arévalo / (United Kingdom) Jonny O'Mara (final)
3. (India) Divij Sharan / (New Zealand) Artem Sitak (quarterfinals)
4. (Uruguay) Ariel Behar / (Ecuador) Gonzalo Escobar (quarterfinals)

== Draw ==
Key

- Q = Qualifier
- WC = Wild card
- LL = Lucky loser
- Alt = Alternate
- ITF = ITF entry
- PR = Protected ranking
- SR = Special ranking
- SE = Special exempt
- JE = Junior exempt
- JR = Junior Accelerator Programme entrant
- CO = College Accelerator Programme entrant
- NG = Next Gen Accelerator Program entrant
- w/o = Walkover
- r = Retired
- d = Defaulted

=== Draw ===
First round
1 | (Brazil) M Demoliner (Netherlands) M Middelkoop | 5 | 6 | [10]
(Bolivia) H Dellien (Sweden) A Göransson | 7 | 3 | [8]
(Argentina) F Delbonis (Argentina) G Durán | 6 | 3 | [5]
WC | (Chile) MT Barrios Vera (Chile) A Tabilo | 4 | 6 | [10]
3 | (India) D Sharan (New Zealand) A Sitak | 7^{7} | 7^{7}
(Brazil) T Monteiro (Brazil) F Romboli | 6^{5} | 6^{2}
WC | (Chile) G Lama (Brazil) T Seyboth Wild | 4 | 5
(Spain) R Carballés Baena (Spain) A Davidovich Fokina | 6 | 7
(Monaco) R Arneodo (Germany) A Begemann | 6^{2} | 4
(Argentina) F Bagnis (Uruguay) P Cuevas | 7^{7} | 6
(Argentina) L Mayer (Argentina) A Molteni | 5 | 5
4 | (Uruguay) A Behar (Ecuador) G Escobar | 7 | 7
(Netherlands) S Arends (Netherlands) D Pel | 4 | 6 | [3]
(Argentina) F Coria (Argentina) JI Londero | 6 | 1 | [10]
(Czech Republic) R Jebavý (Slovakia) I Zelenay | 4 | 6 | [6]
2 | (El Salvador) M Arévalo (United Kingdom) J O'Mara | 6 | 4 | [10]

Quarterfinals
1 | (Brazil) M Demoliner (Netherlands) M Middelkoop | 6 | 3 | [8]
WC | (Chile) MT Barrios Vera (Chile) A Tabilo | 1 | 6 | [10]
3 | (India) D Sharan (New Zealand) A Sitak | 3 | 6 | [4]
(Spain) R Carballés Baena (Spain) A Davidovich Fokina | 6 | 3 | [10]
(Argentina) F Bagnis (Uruguay) P Cuevas | 6 | 6
4 | (Uruguay) A Behar (Ecuador) G Escobar | 3 | 4
(Argentina) F Coria (Argentina) JI Londero | 6^{3} | 3
2 | (El Salvador) M Arévalo (United Kingdom) J O'Mara | 7^{7} | 6

Semifinals
WC | (Chile) MT Barrios Vera (Chile) A Tabilo | 3 | 2
(Spain) R Carballés Baena (Spain) A Davidovich Fokina | 6 | 6
(Argentina) F Bagnis (Uruguay) P Cuevas | 6^{5} | 4
2 | (El Salvador) M Arévalo (United Kingdom) J O'Mara | 7^{7} | 6

Final
(Spain) R Carballés Baena (Spain) A Davidovich Fokina | 7^{7} | 6
2 | (El Salvador) M Arévalo (United Kingdom) J O'Mara | 6^{3} | 1
