= 2026 Samsun Open =

- Date: 27 July – 2 August (men); 5–11 October (women)
- Edition: 1st (men); 2nd (women)
- Category: ATP Challenger 50 (men); WTA 125 (women)
- Prize money: $63,000 (men) $115,000 (women)
- Surface: Hard / outdoor
- Location: Samsun, Turkey

Champions

Men's singles
- (France) Gabriel Debru

Women's singles
- (Turkey) Ayla Aksu

Men's doubles
- (United States) Christopher Papa / (China) Zheng Baoluo

Women's doubles
- Elena Pridankina / Anastasia Tikhonova
- Samsun Open

The 2026 Samsun Open was a combined men's and women's professional tennis tournament played on outdoor hardcourts. It was the first edition of the men's event and the second edition of the women's event. The tournament was an event on the 2026 ATP Challenger Tour and also part of the 2026 WTA 125 tournaments. It took place in Samsun, Turkey from 27 July to 2 August for the men and from 5 to 11 October for the women.

== Men's singles main-draw entrants ==
=== Seeds ===
Country	Player	Rank^{1}	Seed
FRA	Dan Added	223	1
FRA	Florent Bax	250	2
GBR	Max Basing	257	3
TUR	Yankı Erel	299	4
TUR	Mert Alkaya	309	5
IND	Manas Dhamne	374	6
BUL	Dimitar Kuzmanov	395	7
UKR	Vadym Ursu	417	8

- ^{1} Rankings are as of 20 July 2026.

=== Other entrants ===
The following players received wildcards into the main draw:

- (Turkey) Arda Azkara
- (Turkey) Koray Kırcı
- (Turkey) Ergi Kırkın

The following player received entry into the singles main draw using a protected ranking:

- (France) Gabriel Debru

The following player received entry into the singles main draw through the College Accelerator programme:

- (France) Paul Inchauspé

The following players received entry into the singles main draw as alternates:

- (Turkey) Cem İlkel
- (India) Sidharth Rawat

The following players received entry from the qualifying draw:

- (France) Constantin Bittoun Kouzmine
- (Turkey) Tuncay Duran
- (Japan) Kenta Miyoshi
- (Japan) Shunsuke Nakagawa
- (Turkey) Togan Tokaç
- (Turkey) Mert Naci Türker

== Women's singles main-draw entrants ==
=== Seeds ===
Country	Player	Rank^{1}	Seed
CRO	Antonia Ružić	83	1
FRA	Anna Blinkova	89	2
SUI	Simona Waltert	98	3
AUT	Julia Grabher	99	4
ESP	Oksana Selekhmeteva	101	5
FRA	Léolia Jeanjean	109	6
JPN	Himeno Sakatsume	120	7
ITA	Lucrezia Stefanini	125	8

- ^{1} Rankings are as of 28 September 2026.

=== Other entrants ===
The following players received wildcards into the singles main draw:

- (Turkey) Çağla Büyükakçay
- (Turkey) Elvin Egribel
- (Australia) Melisa Ercan
- (Turkey) Ayşegül Mert

The following players received entry from the qualifying draw:

- (Georgia (country)) Mariam Bolkvadze
- (Germany) Noma Noha Akugue
- (United States) Alana Smith
- (Germany) Caroline Werner

The following player received entry as a lucky loser:

- (Australia) Elena Micic

=== Withdrawals ===
Before the tournament

- (Armenia) Elina Avanesyan → replaced by (Canada) Bianca Andreescu
- (United Kingdom) Harriet Dart → replaced by (United Kingdom) Alicia Dudeney
- (France) Fiona Ferro → replaced by (Poland) Linda Klimovičová
- (Georgia (country)) Ekaterine Gorgodze → replaced by (Turkey) Ayla Aksu
- (Andorra) Victoria Jiménez Kasintseva → replaced by (Slovakia) Viktória Hrunčáková
- (Italy) Lisa Pigato → replaced by (France) Carole Monnet
- (Argentina) Julia Riera → replaced by (United States) Fiona Crawley
- (Latvia) Darja Semeņistaja → replaced by (Netherlands) Suzan Lamens
- (Argentina) Solana Sierra → replaced by (Serbia) Teodora Kostović → replaced by (Australia) Elena Micic (LL)

== Women's doubles entrants ==
=== Seeds ===
Country	Player	Country	Player	Rank	Seed
	Elena Pridankina		Anastasia Tikhonova	149	1
SLO	Dalila Jakupović	BEL	Lara Salden	194	2
POL	Weronika Falkowska	USA	Alana Smith	203	3
CRO	Lucija Ćirić Bagarić	KAZ	Zhibek Kulambayeva	215	4

- Rankings as of 28 September 2026.

=== Withdrawals ===
During the tournament

- (France) Carole Monnet / (Serbia) Lola Radivojević (Radivojević - right ankle injury)

== Champions ==
=== Men's singles ===
- (France) Gabriel Debru def. (France) Constantin Bittoun Kouzmine 3–6, 7–5, 6–4.

=== Women's singles ===
- (Turkey) Ayla Aksu def. (Italy) Lucrezia Stefanini 7–5, 2–6, 6–2

=== Men's doubles ===
- (United States) Christopher Papa / (China) Zheng Baoluo def. (France) Dan Added / (France) Gabriel Debru 6–4, 6–7^{(2–7)}, [13–11].

=== Women's doubles ===
- Elena Pridankina / Anastasia Tikhonova def. (India) Rutuja Bhosale / (Australia) Elena Micic 7–6^{(7–5)}, 6–7^{(7–9)}, [10–3]
