= 2024 Open Saint-Brieuc – Singles =

Singles
- 2024 Open Saint-Brieuc

Final
- Champion: (France) Benjamin Bonzi
- Runner-up: (France) Lucas Pouille
- Score: 6–2, 6–3

Events
Singles	Doubles
- Open Saint-Brieuc

Ričardas Berankis was the defending champion but lost in the first round to Lucas Pouille.

Benjamin Bonzi won the title after defeating Pouille 6–2, 6–3 in the final.

== Seeds ==
1. (France) Lucas Pouille (final)
2. (France) Grégoire Barrère (semifinals)
3. (France) Titouan Droguet (first round)
4. (France) Benjamin Bonzi (champion)
5. (France) Valentin Royer (first round)
6. (United Kingdom) Paul Jubb (quarterfinals)
7. (France) Matteo Martineau (first round)
8. (France) Antoine Escoffier (second round)

== Draw ==
Key

- Q = Qualifier
- WC = Wild card
- LL = Lucky loser
- Alt = Alternate
- ITF = ITF entry
- PR = Protected ranking
- SR = Special ranking
- SE = Special exempt
- JE = Junior exempt
- JR = Junior Accelerator Programme entrant
- CO = College Accelerator Programme entrant
- NG = Next Gen Accelerator Program entrant
- w/o = Walkover
- r = Retired
- d = Defaulted

=== Finals ===
Semifinals
1	(France) Lucas Pouille	7^{12}	6
(France) Antoine Cornut-Chauvinc	6^{10}	4
4	(France) Benjamin Bonzi	6	6
2	(France) Grégoire Barrère	4	3

Final
1	(France) Lucas Pouille	2	3
4	(France) Benjamin Bonzi	6	6

=== Top half ===
First round
1	(France) L Pouille	2	6	6
Alt	(Lithuania) R Berankis	6	1	2
(France) R Bertrand	6	2	6
(Jordan) A Shelbayh	4	6	2
Q	(Germany) MH Rehberg	6	6
WC	(France) S Gueymard Wayenburg	4	4
(Spain) B Zapata Miralles	6	3	6
5	(France) V Royer	1	6	2
3	(France) T Droguet	2	2
Q	(France) L Poullain	6	6
(France) Antoine Cornut-Chauvinc	7	6
WC	(France) M Bourgue	5	4
Q	(United Kingdom) K Edmund	6	6
Q	(Switzerland) J Paul	3	3
E Gerasimov	2	0
8	(France) A Escoffier	6	6

Second round
1	(France) L Pouille	6	6
(France) R Bertrand	2	4
Q	(Germany) MH Rehberg	6	6
(Spain) B Zapata Miralles	4	3
Q	(France) L Poullain	2	5
(France) A Cornut-Chauvinc	6	7
Q	(United Kingdom) K Edmund	4	6	6
8	(France) A Escoffier	6	3	2

Quarterfinals
1	(France) L Pouille	6	7^{7}
Q	(Germany) MH Rehberg	1	6^{2}
(France) A Cornut-Chauvinc	7	7^{7}
Q	(United Kingdom) K Edmund	5	6^{2}

Semifinals
1	(France) L Pouille	7^{12}	6
(France) A Cornut-Chauvinc	6^{10}	4

=== Bottom half ===
First round
7	(France) M Martineau	4	6^{11}
(France) C Hemery	6	7^{13}
(France) C Chidekh	4	6	4
Q	(Czech Republic) J Veselý	6	3	6
(Syria) H Naw	6	6
Q	(Switzerland) M Brunold	4	4
(Croatia) D Prižmić	1	4
4	(France) B Bonzi	6	6
6	(United Kingdom) P Jubb	6	6
LL	(France) M Chazal	2	3
(France) G Debru	6	6
Alt	(France) C Tabur	4	4
WC	(France) M Kouamé	4	0
(France) Jules Marie	6	6
(France) G Blancaneaux	2	5
2	(France) G Barrère	6	7

Second round
(France) C Hemery	6	6
Q	(Czech Republic) J Veselý	3	4
(Syria) H Naw	1	4
4	(France) B Bonzi	6	6
6	(United Kingdom) P Jubb	6	7^{7}
(France) G Debru	2	6^{5}
(France) J Marie	4	5
2	(France) G Barrère	6	7

Quarterfinals
(France) C Hemery	3	4
4	(France) B Bonzi	6	6
6	(United Kingdom) P Jubb	4	6^{4}
2	(France) G Barrère	6	7^{7}

Semifinals
4	(France) B Bonzi	6	6
2	(France) G Barrère	4	3
