= 2026 Samsun Open – Women's doubles =

Women's doubles
- 2026 Samsun Open

Final
- Champions: Elena Pridankina; Anastasia Tikhonova
- Runners-up: (India) Rutuja Bhosale (Australia) Elena Micic
- Score: 7–6^{(7–5)}, 6–7^{(7–9)}, [10–3]

Events
Singles	men	women
Doubles	men	women
- Samsun Open

Elena Pridankina and Anastasia Tikhonova won the title, after defeating Rutuja Bhosale and Elena Micic 7–6^{(7–5)}, 6–7^{(7–9)}, [10–3] in the final.

Naïma Karamoko and Tiantsoa Rakotomanga Rajaonah were the defending champions, but only Karamoko chose to defend her title partnering Noma Noha Akugue. They lost in the quarterfinals to Lucija Ćirić Bagarić and Zhibek Kulambayeva.

== Seeds ==
1. Elena Pridankina / Anastasia Tikhonova (champions)
2. (Slovenia) Dalila Jakupović / (Belgium) Lara Salden (semifinals)
3. (Poland) Weronika Falkowska / (United States) Alana Smith (first round)
4. (Croatia) Lucija Ćirić Bagarić / (Kazakhstan) Zhibek Kulambayeva (semifinals)

== Draw ==
Key

- Q = Qualifier
- WC = Wild card
- LL = Lucky loser
- Alt = Alternate
- ITF = ITF entry
- PR = Protected ranking
- SR = Special ranking
- SE = Special exempt
- JE = Junior exempt
- JR = Junior Accelerator Programme entrant
- CO = College Accelerator Programme entrant
- NG = Next Gen Accelerator Program entrant
- w/o = Walkover
- r = Retired
- d = Defaulted

=== Draw ===
First round
(Turkey) EA Yılmaz (Turkey) İ Yörük	3	1
(India) A Raina (Turkey) D Türkmen	6	6
4	(Croatia) L Ćirić Bagarić (Kazakhstan) Z Kulambayeva	6	6
(United States) F Crawley; E Yashina	3	1
(United Kingdom) F Christie (United Kingdom) E Silva	2	4
(Switzerland) N Karamoko (Germany) N Noha Akugue	6	6
(France) C Monnet (Serbia) L Radivojević	6	6
(Turkey) E Egribel (Turkey) S Oral	0	0
(India) R Bhosale (Australia) E Micic	6	6
3	(Poland) W Falkowska (United States) A Smith	3	3
(Canada) HK Kaler (Latvia) A Lačinova	1	1
(Australia) T McGiffin (Bosnia and Herzegovina) A Wagner	6	6

Quarterfinals
1	E Pridankina; A Tikhonova	6	6
(India) A Raina (Turkey) D Türkmen	3	2
4	(Croatia) L Ćirić Bagarić (Kazakhstan) Z Kulambayeva	6	6
(Switzerland) N Karamoko (Germany) N Noha Akugue	3	4
(France) C Monnet (Serbia) L Radivojević
(India) R Bhosale (Australia) E Micic	w/o
(Australia) T McGiffin (Bosnia and Herzegovina) A Wagner	6^{4}	2
2	(Slovenia) D Jakupović (Belgium) L Salden	7^{7}	6

Semifinals
1	E Pridankina; A Tikhonova	7	6
4	(Croatia) L Ćirić Bagarić (Kazakhstan) Z Kulambayeva	5	3
(India) R Bhosale (Australia) E Micic	6	7
2	(Slovenia) D Jakupović (Belgium) L Salden	0	5

Final
1	E Pridankina; A Tikhonova	7^{7}	6^{7}	[10]
(India) R Bhosale (Australia) E Micic	6^{5}	7^{9}	[3]
