= 2019 Challenger Ciudad de Guayaquil – Doubles =

Doubles
- 2019 Challenger Ciudad de Guayaquil

Final
- Champions: (Uruguay) Ariel Behar (Ecuador) Gonzalo Escobar
- Runners-up: (Brazil) Pedro Sakamoto (Brazil) Thiago Seyboth Wild
- Score: 7–6^{(7–4)}, 7–6^{(7–5)}

Events
| Singles | Doubles |
- Challenger Ciudad de Guayaquil

Guillermo Durán and Roberto Quiroz were the defending champions but only Quiroz chose to defend his title, partnering Yannick Hanfmann. Quiroz lost in the first round to Luis David Martínez and Felipe Meligeni Alves.

Ariel Behar and Gonzalo Escobar won the title after defeating Pedro Sakamoto and Thiago Seyboth Wild 7–6^{(7–4)}, 7–6^{(7–5)} in the final.

== Seeds ==
1. (Uruguay) Ariel Behar / (Ecuador) Gonzalo Escobar (champions)
2. (Mexico) Miguel Ángel Reyes-Varela / (Brazil) Fernando Romboli (first round)
3. (Venezuela) Luis David Martínez / (Brazil) Felipe Meligeni Alves (semifinals)
4. (Brazil) Orlando Luz / (Brazil) Rafael Matos (semifinals)

== Draw ==
Key

- Q = Qualifier
- WC = Wild card
- LL = Lucky loser
- Alt = Alternate
- ITF = ITF entry
- PR = Protected ranking
- SR = Special ranking
- SE = Special exempt
- JE = Junior exempt
- JR = Junior Accelerator Programme entrant
- CO = College Accelerator Programme entrant
- NG = Next Gen Accelerator Program entrant
- w/o = Walkover
- r = Retired
- d = Defaulted

First round
1 | (Uruguay) A Behar (Ecuador) G Escobar | 6 | 6
(Portugal) P Sousa (Netherlands) M Vervoort | 3 | 4
(Peru) A Merino (Spain) M Vilella Martínez | 6 | 6
WC | (Ecuador) Juan Diego Rojas (Ecuador) Alexander Zederbauer | 1 | 1
4 | (Brazil) O Luz (Brazil) R Matos | 6 | 6
Alt | (Brazil) Wilson Leite (Sweden) C Lindell | 4 | 2
(Brazil) G Clezar (Portugal) J Domingues | 4 | 2
(Peru) S Galdós (Ecuador) D Hidalgo | 6 | 6
(Colombia) DE Galán (Argentina) F Mena | 6 | 3 | [4]
(Bolivia) B Arias (Bolivia) F Zeballos | 1 | 6 | [10]
(Germany) Y Hanfmann (Ecuador) R Quiroz | 6 | 6^{1} | [4]
3 | (Venezuela) LD Martínez (Brazil) F Meligeni Alves | 3 | 7^{7} | [10]
WC | (Brazil) P Sakamoto (Brazil) T Seyboth Wild | 7 | 7^{7}
WC | (Argentina) F Díaz Acosta (Ecuador) AC March | 5 | 6^{2}
Alt | (Brazil) Oscar José Gutierrez (Brazil) J Menezes | 6 | 6
2 | (Mexico) MÁ Reyes-Varela (Brazil) F Romboli | 4 | 4

Quarterfinals
1 | (Uruguay) A Behar (Ecuador) G Escobar | 6 | 6
(Peru) A Merino (Spain) M Vilella Martínez | 2 | 3
4 | (Brazil) O Luz (Brazil) R Matos | 6 | 3 | [12]
(Peru) S Galdós (Ecuador) D Hidalgo | 2 | 6 | [10]
(Bolivia) B Arias (Bolivia) F Zeballos | 2 | 4
3 | (Venezuela) LD Martínez (Brazil) F Meligeni Alves | 6 | 6
WC | (Brazil) P Sakamoto (Brazil) T Seyboth Wild | 6 | 7
Alt | (Brazil) OJ Gutierrez (Brazil) J Menezes | 2 | 5

Semifinals
1 | (Uruguay) A Behar (Ecuador) G Escobar | 6 | 7
4 | (Brazil) O Luz (Brazil) R Matos | 4 | 5
3 | (Venezuela) LD Martínez (Brazil) F Meligeni Alves | 6^{3} | 6 | [3]
WC | (Brazil) P Sakamoto (Brazil) T Seyboth Wild | 7^{7} | 4 | [10]

Final
1 | (Uruguay) A Behar (Ecuador) G Escobar | 7^{7} | 7^{7}
WC | (Brazil) P Sakamoto (Brazil) T Seyboth Wild | 6^{4} | 6^{5}
