= 2020 Chile Open – Singles =

Singles
- 2020 Chile Open

Final
- Champion: (Brazil) Thiago Seyboth Wild
- Runner-up: (Norway) Casper Ruud
- Score: 7–5, 4–6, 6–3

Details
- Draw: 28
- Seeds: 8

Events
Singles	Doubles
- Chile Open

Fabio Fognini was the champion in 2014, when the event was last held, but chose to compete in Dubai instead.

Thiago Seyboth Wild won his first ATP Tour title, defeating Casper Ruud in the final, 7–5, 4–6, 6–3. Seyboth Wild also becomes the first player born in 2000 to win an ATP Tour title.

== Seeds ==
The top four seeds received a bye into the second round.

1. (Chile) Cristian Garín (quarterfinals, retired)
2. (Norway) Casper Ruud (final)
3. (Spain) Albert Ramos Viñolas (semifinals)
4. (Uruguay) Pablo Cuevas (second round)
5. (Argentina) Juan Ignacio Londero (second round)
6. (Bolivia) Hugo Dellien (quarterfinals)
7. (Argentina) Federico Delbonis (quarterfinals)
8. (Brazil) Thiago Monteiro (quarterfinals)

== Draw ==
Key

- Q = Qualifier
- WC = Wild card
- LL = Lucky loser
- Alt = Alternate
- ITF = ITF entry
- PR = Protected ranking
- SR = Special ranking
- SE = Special exempt
- JE = Junior exempt
- JR = Junior Accelerator Programme entrant
- CO = College Accelerator Programme entrant
- NG = Next Gen Accelerator Program entrant
- w/o = Walkover
- r = Retired
- d = Defaulted

=== Finals ===
Semifinals
WC	(Brazil) Thiago Seyboth Wild	6	6
Q	(Argentina) Renzo Olivo	1	3
3	(Spain) Albert Ramos Viñolas	6^{5}	2
2	(Norway) Casper Ruud	7^{7}	6

Final
WC	(Brazil) Thiago Seyboth Wild	7	4	6
2	(Norway) Casper Ruud	5	6	3

=== Top half ===
First round
(Slovakia) A Martin	6	6^{5}	3
(Spain) A Davidovich Fokina	2	7^{7}	6
WC	(Brazil) T Seyboth Wild	6	3	6
(Argentina) F Bagnis	1	6	1
(Argentina) F Coria	4	2
5	(Argentina) JI Londero	6	6
Q	(Argentina) R Olivo	4	6	6
(Portugal) P Sousa	6	3	4
WC	(Chile) MT Barrios Vera	4	6	6
Q	(Spain) C Taberner	6	4	2
(Italy) M Cecchinato	3	6	3
6	(Bolivia) H Dellien	6	1	6

Second round
1	(Chile) C Garín	6	0	7^{7}
(Spain) A Davidovich Fokina	2	6	6^{4}
WC	(Brazil) T Seyboth Wild	7^{9}	6
5	(Argentina) JI Londero	6^{7}	4
4	(Uruguay) P Cuevas	7	6^{5}	6^{8}
Q	(Argentina) R Olivo	5	7^{7}	7^{10}
WC	(Chile) MT Barrios Vera	3	6^{2}
6	(Bolivia) H Dellien	6	7^{7}

Quarterfinals
1	(Chile) C Garín	6^{1}	0^{r}
WC	(Brazil) T Seyboth Wild	7^{7}	0
Q	(Argentina) R Olivo	3	7^{7}	7
6	(Bolivia) H Dellien	6	6^{5}	5

Semifinals
WC	(Brazil) T Seyboth Wild	6	6
Q	(Argentina) R Olivo	1	3

=== Bottom half ===
First round
8	(Brazil) T Monteiro	6^{0}	6	6
(Argentina) L Mayer	7^{7}	3	4
(Spain) R Carballés Baena	6	4	6
(Spain) J Munar	4	6	4
Q	(Slovakia) F Horanský	4	2
LL	(Peru) JP Varillas	6	6
7	(Argentina) F Delbonis	6	7^{7}
Q	(Slovakia) M Kližan	1	6^{5}
(Slovakia) J Kovalík	2	3
(Italy) S Caruso	6	6
(Italy) P Lorenzi	3	4
WC	(Chile) A Tabilo	6	6

Second round
8	(Brazil) T Monteiro	6	6
(Spain) R Carballés Baena	1	4
LL	(Peru) JP Varillas	6^{3}	2
3	(Spain) A Ramos Viñolas	7^{7}	6
7	(Argentina) F Delbonis	7^{7}	6
(Italy) S Caruso	6^{1}	3
WC	(Chile) A Tabilo	4	5
2	(Norway) C Ruud	6	7

Quarterfinals
8	(Brazil) T Monteiro	4	4
3	(Spain) A Ramos Viñolas	6	6
7	(Argentina) F Delbonis	5	5
2	(Norway) C Ruud	7	7

Semifinals
3	(Spain) A Ramos Viñolas	6^{5}	2
2	(Norway) C Ruud	7^{7}	6

== Qualifying ==
=== Seeds ===
1. (Peru) Juan Pablo Varillas (qualifying competition, lucky loser)
2. (Slovakia) Martin Kližan (qualified)
3. (Slovakia) Filip Horanský (qualified)
4. (Spain) Carlos Taberner (qualified)
5. (Argentina) Andrea Collarini (qualifying competition)
6. (Argentina) Renzo Olivo (qualified)
7. (Brazil) Pedro Sakamoto (qualifying competition)
8. (Brazil) Orlando Luz (qualifying competition)

=== Qualifiers ===
1. (Argentina) Renzo Olivo
2. (Slovakia) Martin Kližan
3. (Slovakia) Filip Horanský
4. (Spain) Carlos Taberner

=== Lucky loser ===
1. (Peru) Juan Pablo Varillas

=== Qualifying draw ===
==== First qualifier ====
First round
1	(Peru) Juan Pablo Varillas	6	6
WC	(Chile) Matías Gaedechens	1	0
Alt	(Chile) Víctor Núñez	0	6^{3}
6	(Argentina) Renzo Olivo	6	7^{7}

Qualifying competition
1	(Peru) Juan Pablo Varillas	6^{5}	5
6	(Argentina) Renzo Olivo	7^{7}	7

==== Second qualifier ====
First round
2	(Slovakia) Martin Kližan	6	6
(Ukraine) Vadym Ursu	0	0
(Ecuador) Gonzalo Escobar	2	4
8	(Brazil) Orlando Luz	6	6

Qualifying competition
2	(Slovakia) Martin Kližan	6	6
8	(Brazil) Orlando Luz	4	1

==== Third qualifier ====
First round
3	(Slovakia) Filip Horanský	7^{7}	7
WC	(Chile) Gonzalo Lama	6^{3}	5
Alt	(Brazil) Fernando Romboli	1	2
7	(Brazil) Pedro Sakamoto	6	6

Qualifying competition
3	(Slovakia) Filip Horanský	7^{7}	6^{1}	6
7	(Brazil) Pedro Sakamoto	6^{4}	7^{7}	4

==== Fourth qualifier ====
First round
4	(Spain) Carlos Taberner	6	6
Alt	(Argentina) Andrés Molteni	3	2
(Uruguay) Martín Cuevas	2	6^{4}
5	(Argentina) Andrea Collarini	6	7^{7}

Qualifying competition
4	(Spain) Carlos Taberner	6	6
5	(Argentina) Andrea Collarini	2	1
