= 2019 Challenger Ciudad de Guayaquil – Singles =

Singles
- 2019 Challenger Ciudad de Guayaquil

Final
- Champion: (Brazil) Thiago Seyboth Wild
- Runner-up: (Bolivia) Hugo Dellien
- Score: 6–4, 6–0

Events
Singles	Doubles
← 2018 ·	Challenger Ciudad de Guayaquil	· 2020 →

Guido Andreozzi was the defending champion but chose not to defend his title.

Thiago Seyboth Wild won the title after defeating Hugo Dellien 6–4, 6–0 in the final.

== Seeds ==
All seeds receive a bye into the second round.

1. (Bolivia) Hugo Dellien (final)
2. (Argentina) Leonardo Mayer (quarterfinals, retired)
3. (Spain) Jaume Munar (third round)
4. (Brazil) Thiago Monteiro (second round)
5. (Slovakia) Andrej Martin (third round)
6. (Portugal) Pedro Sousa (third round)
7. (Italy) Paolo Lorenzi (third round)
8. (India) Sumit Nagal (withdrew)
9. (Argentina) Federico Coria (semifinals)
10. (Ecuador) Emilio Gómez (second round)
11. (Argentina) Facundo Bagnis (quarterfinals)
12. (Peru) Juan Pablo Varillas (semifinals)
13. (Slovakia) Jozef Kovalík (third round)
14. (Spain) Mario Vilella Martínez (second round)
15. (Germany) Yannick Hanfmann (quarterfinals)
16. (Portugal) João Domingues (second round)

== Draw ==
=== Key ===
- Q = Qualifier
- WC = Wild card
- LL = Lucky loser
- Alt = Alternate
- SE = Special exempt
- PR = Protected ranking
- ITF = ITF entry
- JE = Junior exempt
- w/o = Walkover
- r = Retired
- d = Defaulted
- SR = Special ranking

=== Finals ===
Quarterfinals
1/WC	(Bolivia) Hugo Dellien	7	6
11	(Argentina) Facundo Bagnis	5	2
15	(Germany) Yannick Hanfmann	6	5	4
9	(Argentina) Federico Coria	4	7	6
(Argentina) Francisco Cerúndolo	6^{4}	5
(Brazil) Thiago Seyboth Wild	7^{7}	7
12	(Peru) Juan Pablo Varillas	4
2	(Argentina) Leonardo Mayer	1^{r}

Semifinals
1/WC	(Bolivia) Hugo Dellien	6	6^{3}	7^{7}
9	(Argentina) Federico Coria	3	7^{7}	6^{0}
(Brazil) Thiago Seyboth Wild	6	7
12	(Peru) Juan Pablo Varillas	4	5

Final
1/WC	(Bolivia) Hugo Dellien	4	0
(Brazil) Thiago Seyboth Wild	6	6

=== Top half ===
==== Section 1 ====
First round
(Serbia) P Krstin	6^{6}	6	6
Q	(Brazil) R Matos	7^{8}	3	1
(Colombia) DE Galán	6	6
(Brazil) F Meligeni Alves	4	4
(Argentina) TM Etcheverry	6	6
(Argentina) A Velotti	2	3
(Argentina) G Villanueva	6	6
WC	(Ecuador) AC March	4	3

Second round
1/WC	(Bolivia) H Dellien	6	6
(Serbia) P Krstin	3	2
(Colombia) DE Galán	7^{7}	3	6
16	(Portugal) J Domingues	6^{3}	6	3
11	(Argentina) F Bagnis	6	6
(Argentina) TM Etcheverry	4	3
(Argentina) G Villanueva	2	2
6	(Portugal) P Sousa	6	6

Third round
1/WC	(Bolivia) H Dellien	6	5	7
(Colombia) DE Galán	2	7	5
11	(Argentina) F Bagnis	7^{7}	4	6
6	(Portugal) P Sousa	6^{3}	6	2

Quarterfinals
1/WC	(Bolivia) H Dellien	7	6
11	(Argentina) F Bagnis	5	2

==== Section 2 ====
First round
(Brazil) P Sakamoto	6	6^{3}	4
(Brazil) Oscar José Gutierrez	3	7^{7}	6
(Peru) N Álvarez	2	3
(Brazil) G Clezar	6	6
(Argentina) F Mena	6^{4}	2
(Sweden) C Lindell	7^{7}	6
LL	(Bolivia) F Zeballos	6	4	6
(Colombia) N Mejía	3	6	4

Second round
3	(Spain) J Munar	6	6
(Brazil) OJ Gutierrez	4	2
(Brazil) G Clezar	3	3
15	(Germany) Y Hanfmann	6	6
9	(Argentina) F Coria	6^{4}	7	0
(Sweden) C Lindell	7^{7}	5	0^{r}
LL	(Bolivia) F Zeballos	1	3
5	(Slovakia) A Martin	6	6

Third round
3	(Spain) J Munar	4	0
15	(Germany) Y Hanfmann	6	6
9	(Argentina) F Coria	6	7^{10}
5	(Slovakia) A Martin	4	6^{8}

Quarterfinals
15	(Germany) Y Hanfmann	6	5	4
9	(Argentina) F Coria	4	7	6

=== Bottom half ===
==== Section 3 ====
First round
(Chile) Bastián Malla	5	2
(Uruguay) M Cuevas	7	6
(France) M Chazal	6^{4}	2
(Argentina) F Cerúndolo	7^{7}	6
(Ecuador) D Hidalgo	2	4
(United States) U Blanch	6	6
Alt	(Brazil) Wilson Leite	4	1
(Brazil) T Seyboth Wild	6	6

Second round
7	(Italy) P Lorenzi	7	6
(Uruguay) M Cuevas	5	4
(Argentina) F Cerúndolo	6	3	6
10	(Ecuador) E Gómez	4	6	1
13	(Slovakia) J Kovalík	6	3	6
(United States) U Blanch	2	6	3
(Brazil) T Seyboth Wild	7^{8}	7^{7}
4	(Brazil) T Monteiro	6^{6}	6^{5}

Third round
7	(Italy) P Lorenzi	3	6^{5}
(Argentina) F Cerúndolo	6	7^{7}
13	(Slovakia) J Kovalík	3	6	3
(Brazil) T Seyboth Wild	6	3	6

Quarterfinals
(Argentina) F Cerúndolo	6^{4}	5
(Brazil) T Seyboth Wild	7^{7}	7

==== Section 4 ====
First round
WC	(Colombia) A González	6	3	4
WC	(Argentina) F Díaz Acosta	4	6	6
(Brazil) O Luz	6	7^{7}
(Argentina) JP Ficovich	3	6^{4}
(Brazil) J Menezes	2	2
(Ecuador) R Quiroz	6	6
(Argentina) A Collarini	6	6
WC	(Ecuador) Alexander Zederbauer	2	2

Second round
Q	(Peru) M Echazú	3	6	5
WC	(Argentina) F Díaz Acosta	6	4	7
(Brazil) O Luz	6^{0}	0^{r}
12	(Peru) JP Varillas	7^{7}	2
14	(Spain) M Vilella Martínez	7^{7}	5	2
(Ecuador) R Quiroz	6^{5}	7	6
(Argentina) A Collarini	1	6	4
2	(Argentina) L Mayer	6	2	6

Third round
WC	(Argentina) F Díaz Acosta	2	3
12	(Peru) JP Varillas	6	6
(Ecuador) R Quiroz	3	4
2	(Argentina) L Mayer	6	6

Quarterfinals
12	(Peru) JP Varillas	4
2	(Argentina) L Mayer	1^{r}
