= 2024 Città di Como Challenger – Doubles =

Doubles
- 2024 Città di Como Challenger

Final
- Champions: (Romania) Victor Vlad Cornea (Ukraine) Denys Molchanov
- Runners-up: (Romania) Alexandru Jecan; Ivan Liutarevich
- Score: 6–2, 6–3

Events
Singles	Doubles
- Città di Como Challenger

Constantin Frantzen and Hendrik Jebens were the defending champions but chose not to defend their title.

Victor Vlad Cornea and Denys Molchanov won the title after defeating Alexandru Jecan and Ivan Liutarevich 6–2, 6–3 in the final.

== Seeds ==
1. (Romania) Victor Vlad Cornea / (Ukraine) Denys Molchanov (champions)
2. (Germany) Jakob Schnaitter / (Germany) Mark Wallner (first round)
3. (Czech Republic) Petr Nouza / (Czech Republic) Patrik Rikl (first round)
4. (Sweden) Filip Bergevi / (Netherlands) Mick Veldheer (semifinals)

== Draw ==
Key

- Q = Qualifier
- WC = Wild card
- LL = Lucky loser
- Alt = Alternate
- ITF = ITF entry
- PR = Protected ranking
- SR = Special ranking
- SE = Special exempt
- JE = Junior exempt
- JR = Junior Accelerator Programme entrant
- CO = College Accelerator Programme entrant
- NG = Next Gen Accelerator Program entrant
- w/o = Walkover
- r = Retired
- d = Defaulted

=== Draw ===
First round
1	(Romania) V Cornea (Ukraine) D Molchanov	6	3	[10]
(Switzerland) R Bertola (Italy) Samuel Vincent Ruggeri	2	6	[7]
(France) G Debru (Ukraine) V Sachko	w/o
(Brazil) G Heide (Brazil) M Pucinelli de Almeida
3	(Czech Republic) P Nouza (Czech Republic) P Rikl	6	4	[7]
(Italy) G Oradini (Italy) S Travaglia	4	6	[10]
(Romania) FC Jianu (Ukraine) V Uzhylovskyi	6^{5}	0^{r}
WC	(Italy) A Arnaboldi (Italy) F Arnaboldi	7^{7}	3
(Czech Republic) Jiří Barnat (Czech Republic) F Duda	w/o
Alt	(Kazakhstan) D Popko (Italy) Alexander Weis
WC	(Italy) Jacopo Bilardo (Italy) G Vulpitta	1	5
4	(Sweden) F Bergevi (Netherlands) M Veldheer	6	7
(Serbia) I Sabanov (Serbia) M Sabanov	4	5
(Denmark) J Ingildsen (United Kingdom) D Stevenson	6	7
(Romania) A Jecan; I Liutarevich	3	6	[10]
2	(Germany) J Schnaitter (Germany) M Wallner	6	1	[2]

Quarterfinals
1	(Romania) V Cornea (Ukraine) D Molchanov	6	6^{5}	[10]
(France) G Debru (Ukraine) V Sachko	2	7^{7}	[7]
(Italy) G Oradini (Italy) S Travaglia	6^{3}	4
WC	(Italy) A Arnaboldi (Italy) F Arnaboldi	7^{7}	6
(Czech Republic) J Barnat (Czech Republic) F Duda	4	3
4	(Sweden) F Bergevi (Netherlands) M Veldheer	6	6
(Denmark) J Ingildsen (United Kingdom) D Stevenson	4	2
(Romania) A Jecan; I Liutarevich	6	6

Semifinals
1	(Romania) V Cornea (Ukraine) D Molchanov	1	6	[12]
WC	(Italy) A Arnaboldi (Italy) F Arnaboldi	6	3	[10]
4	(Sweden) F Bergevi (Netherlands) M Veldheer	4	4
(Romania) A Jecan; I Liutarevich	6	6

Final
1	(Romania) V Cornea (Ukraine) D Molchanov	6	6
(Romania) A Jecan; I Liutarevich	2	3
