= 2020 Chile Open =

- Date: 24 February – 1 March
- Edition: 22nd
- Category: ATP Tour 250 series
- Draw: 28S / 16D
- Prize money: $604,010
- Surface: Clay / outdoor
- Location: Santiago, Chile

Champions

Singles
- (Brazil) Thiago Seyboth Wild

Doubles
- (Spain) Roberto Carballés Baena / (Spain) Alejandro Davidovich Fokina
- Chile Open

The 2020 Chile Open (also known as the Chile Dove Men+Care Open for sponsorship reasons) was a men's tennis tournament played on outdoor clay courts. It was the 22nd edition of the Chile Open (the first since 2014), and part of the ATP 250 of the 2020 ATP Tour. It took place in Santiago, Chile from 24 February through 1 March 2020. Unseeded Thiago Seyboth Wild, who entered on a wildcard, won the singles title.

== Finals ==
=== Singles ===
- (Brazil) Thiago Seyboth Wild defeated (Norway) Casper Ruud, 7–5, 4–6, 6–3

=== Doubles ===
- (Spain) Roberto Carballés Baena / (Spain) Alejandro Davidovich Fokina defeated (El Salvador) Marcelo Arévalo / (United Kingdom) Jonny O'Mara, 7–6^{(7–3)}, 6–1

== Singles main draw entrants ==
=== Seeds ===
Country	Player	Rank^{1}	Seed
CHI	Cristian Garín	18	1
NOR	Casper Ruud	34	2
ESP	Albert Ramos Viñolas	41	3
URU	Pablo Cuevas	46	4
ARG	Juan Ignacio Londero	61	5
BOL	Hugo Dellien	78	6
ARG	Federico Delbonis	86	7
BRA	Thiago Monteiro	88	8

- Rankings are as of February 17, 2020.

=== Other entrants ===
The following players received wildcards into the singles main draw:

- (Chile) Marcelo Tomás Barrios Vera
- (Brazil) Thiago Seyboth Wild
- (Chile) Alejandro Tabilo

The following players received entry from the qualifying draw:

- (Slovakia) Filip Horanský
- (Slovakia) Martin Kližan
- (Argentina) Renzo Olivo
- (Spain) Carlos Taberner

The following player received entry as a lucky loser:

- (Peru) Juan Pablo Varillas

=== Withdrawals ===
Before the tournament

- (Croatia) Borna Ćorić → replaced by (Slovakia) Jozef Kovalík
- (Serbia) Laslo Đere → replaced by (Slovakia) Andrej Martin
- (Chile) Nicolás Jarry → replaced by (Argentina) Federico Coria
- (France) Corentin Moutet → replaced by (Argentina) Leonardo Mayer
- (Argentina) Guido Pella → replaced by (Peru) Juan Pablo Varillas
- (Argentina) Diego Schwartzman → replaced by (Italy) Paolo Lorenzi
- (Spain) Fernando Verdasco → replaced by (Italy) Salvatore Caruso

=== Retirements ===
- (Chile) Cristian Garín

== Doubles main draw entrants ==
=== Seeds ===
Country	Player	Country	Player	Rank^{1}	Seed
BRA	Marcelo Demoliner	NED	Matwé Middelkoop	101	1
ESA	Marcelo Arévalo	GBR	Jonny O'Mara	118	2
IND	Divij Sharan	NZL	Artem Sitak	124	3
URU	Ariel Behar	ECU	Gonzalo Escobar	141	4

- Rankings are as of February 17, 2020.

=== Other entrants ===
The following pairs received wildcards into the doubles main draw:

- (Chile) Marcelo Tomás Barrios Vera / (Chile) Alejandro Tabilo
- (Chile) Gonzalo Lama / (Brazil) Thiago Seyboth Wild
