= 2019 Challenger Ciudad de Guayaquil =

- Date: 28 October – 3 November
- Edition: 15th
- Surface: Clay
- Location: Guayaquil, Ecuador

Champions

Singles
- (Brazil) Thiago Seyboth Wild

Doubles
- (Uruguay) Ariel Behar / (Ecuador) Gonzalo Escobar
- Challenger Ciudad de Guayaquil

The 2019 Challenger Ciudad de Guayaquil was a professional tennis tournament played on clay courts. It was the fifteenth edition of the tournament which was part of the 2019 ATP Challenger Tour. It took place in Guayaquil, Ecuador between October 28 and November 3, 2019.

== Singles main-draw entrants ==
=== Seeds ===
Country	Player	Rank^{1}	Seed
BOL	Hugo Dellien	78	1
ARG	Leonardo Mayer	95	2
ESP	Jaume Munar	96	3
BRA	Thiago Monteiro	97	4
SVK	Andrej Martin	115	5
POR	Pedro Sousa	116	6
ITA	Paolo Lorenzi	120	7
~~IND~~	~~Sumit Nagal~~	~~129~~	~~8~~
ARG	Federico Coria	131	9
ECU	Emilio Gómez	143	10
ARG	Facundo Bagnis	146	11
PER	Juan Pablo Varillas	161	12
SVK	Jozef Kovalík	178	13
ESP	Mario Vilella Martínez	179	14
GER	Yannick Hanfmann	187	15
POR	João Domingues	188	16

- ^{1} Rankings are as of 21 October 2019.

=== Other entrants ===
The following players received wildcards into the singles main draw:

- (Bolivia) Hugo Dellien
- (Argentina) Facundo Díaz Acosta
- (Colombia) Alejandro González
- (Ecuador) Antonio Cayetano March
- (Ecuador) Alexander Zederbauer

The following player received entry into the singles main draw as an alternate:

- (Brazil) Wilson Leite

The following players received entry from the qualifying draw:

- (Peru) Mauricio Echazú
- (Brazil) Rafael Matos

The following player received entry as a lucky loser:

- (Bolivia) Federico Zeballos

== Champions ==
=== Singles ===
- (Brazil) Thiago Seyboth Wild def. (Bolivia) Hugo Dellien 6–4, 6–0.

=== Doubles ===
- (Uruguay) Ariel Behar / (Ecuador) Gonzalo Escobar def. (Brazil) Pedro Sakamoto / (Brazil) Thiago Seyboth Wild 7–6^{(7–4)}, 7–6^{(7–5)}.
