= 2026 Samsun Open – Women's singles =

Women's singles
- 2026 Samsun Open

Final
- Champion: (Turkey) Ayla Aksu
- Runner-up: (Italy) Lucrezia Stefanini
- Score: 7–5, 2–6, 6–2

Details
- Draw: 32 (4Q / 4WC)

Events
Singles	men	women
Doubles	men	women
- Samsun Open

Ayla Aksu won the title, defeating Lucrezia Stefanini 7–5, 2–6, 6–2 in the final.

Kaja Juvan was the defending champion, but chose not to participate.

== Seeds ==
1. (Croatia) Antonia Ružić (first round)
2. (France) Anna Blinkova (semifinals)
3. (Switzerland) Simona Waltert (quarterfinals)
4. (Austria) Julia Grabher (first round)
5. (Spain) Oksana Selekhmeteva (second round)
6. (France) Léolia Jeanjean (first round)
7. (Japan) Himeno Sakatsume (semifinals)
8. (Italy) Lucrezia Stefanini (final)

== Draw ==
Key

- Q = Qualifier
- WC = Wild card
- LL = Lucky loser
- Alt = Alternate
- ITF = ITF entry
- PR = Protected ranking
- SR = Special ranking
- SE = Special exempt
- JE = Junior exempt
- JR = Junior Accelerator Programme entrant
- CO = College Accelerator Programme entrant
- NG = Next Gen Accelerator Program entrant
- w/o = Walkover
- r = Retired
- d = Defaulted

=== Finals ===
Semifinals
(Turkey) Ayla Aksu	7	6
7	(Japan) Himeno Sakatsume	5	3
8	(Italy) Lucrezia Stefanini	6	6
2	(France) Anna Blinkova	2	3

Final
(Turkey) Ayla Aksu	7	2	6
8	(Italy) Lucrezia Stefanini	5	6	2

=== Top half ===
First round
1	(Croatia) A Ružić	6	3	4
(United Kingdom) A Dudeney	3	6	6
(Colombia) E Arango	3	2
(Turkey) A Aksu	6	6
(Italy) L Bronzetti	2	4
(United States) F Crawley	6	6
(Serbia) L Radivojević	5	6^{0}
5	(Spain) O Selekhmeteva	7	7^{7}
3	(Switzerland) S Waltert	6	6
WC	(Australia) M Ercan	2	2
WC	(Turkey) Ç Büyükakçay	6	6^{2}	1
(Poland) L Klimovičová	3	7^{7}	6
WC	(Turkey) A Mert	2	6	2
(Slovakia) V Hrunčáková	6	4	6
(Czech Republic) D Šalková	1	4
7	(Japan) H Sakatsume	6	6

Second round
(United Kingdom) A Dudeney	6	3	3
(Turkey) A Aksu	3	6	6
(United States) F Crawley	4	6	6
5	(Spain) O Selekhmeteva	6	4	4
3	(Switzerland) S Waltert	6	6
(Poland) L Klimovičová	3	2
(Slovakia) V Hrunčáková	5	2
7	(Japan) H Sakatsume	7	6

Quarterfinals
(Turkey) A Aksu	3	6	6
(United States) F Crawley	6	3	4
3	(Switzerland) S Waltert	7	4	0
7	(Japan) H Sakatsume	5	6	6

Semifinals
(Turkey) A Aksu	7	6
7	(Japan) H Sakatsume	5	3

=== Bottom half ===
First round
8	(Italy) L Stefanini	7	6
(France) C Monnet	5	4
LL	(Australia) E Micic	3	2
Q	(Germany) N Noha Akugue	6	6
P Iatcenko	6	6
(Netherlands) S Lamens	3	1
(Hungary) D Gálfi	6	6
4	(Austria) J Grabher	3	4
6	(France) L Jeanjean	3	1
Q	(Georgia (country)) M Bolkvadze	6	6
(Canada) B Andreescu	6	6
Q	(United States) A Smith	0	0
WC	(Turkey) E Egribel	0	0
Q	(Germany) C Werner	6	6
E Pridankina	6	2	4
2	(France) A Blinkova	4	6	6

Second round
8	(Italy) L Stefanini	6	6
Q	(Germany) N Noha Akugue	2	3
P Iatcenko	6	7^{8}
(Hungary) D Gálfi	4	6^{6}
Q	(Georgia (country)) M Bolkvadze	4	3
(Canada) B Andreescu	6	6
Q	(Germany) C Werner	2	3
2	(France) A Blinkova	6	6

Quarterfinals
8	(Italy) L Stefanini	6	7
P Iatcenko	3	5
(Canada) B Andreescu	3	4
2	(France) A Blinkova	6	6

Semifinals
8	(Italy) L Stefanini	6	6
2	(France) A Blinkova	2	3

== Qualifying ==
=== Seeds ===
1. (Germany) Noma Noha Akugue (qualified)
2. (United States) Fiona Crawley (moved to main draw)
3. Anastasia Tikhonova (first round)
4. (Germany) Caroline Werner (qualified)
5. (Australia) Elena Micic (qualifying competition, lucky loser)
6. (Poland) Weronika Falkowska (qualifying competition)
7. (Croatia) Lucija Ćirić Bagarić (first round)
8. (Georgia (country)) Mariam Bolkvadze (qualified)

=== Qualifiers ===
1. (Germany) Noma Noha Akugue
2. (United States) Alana Smith
3. (Georgia (country)) Mariam Bolkvadze
4. (Germany) Caroline Werner

=== Lucky loser ===
1. (Australia) Elena Micic

=== Draw ===
==== First qualifier ====
First round
1	(Germany) Noma Noha Akugue	6	6
(Turkey) İlay Yörük	1	4
Maria Golovina	4	4
5	(Australia) Elena Micic	6	6

Qualifying competition
1	(Germany) Noma Noha Akugue	7	6
5	(Australia) Elena Micic	5	3

==== Second qualifier ====
First round
Alt	(Latvia) Adelina Lačinova	6	1	1
(United States) Alana Smith	3	6	6
(Slovenia) Dalila Jakupović	6	6
7	(Croatia) Lucija Ćirić Bagarić	4	4

Qualifying competition
(United States) Alana Smith	6	6
(Slovenia) Dalila Jakupović	1	4

==== Third qualifier ====
First round
3	Anastasia Tikhonova	2	2
Mariia Tkacheva	6	6
WC	(Turkey) Alya Naz Altınel	1	0
8	(Georgia (country)) Mariam Bolkvadze	6	6

Qualifying competition
Mariia Tkacheva	6	6^{5}	0
8	(Georgia (country)) Mariam Bolkvadze	4	7^{7}	6

==== Fourth qualifier ====
First round
4	(Germany) Caroline Werner	6	3	6
Alt	Ekaterina Yashina	3	6	2
WC	(Turkey) Doğa Türkmen	2	3
6	(Poland) Weronika Falkowska	6	6

Qualifying competition
4	(Germany) Caroline Werner	6	2	7^{7}
6	(Poland) Weronika Falkowska	3	6	6^{3}
