= 2026 Samsun Open – Men's singles =

Men's singles
- 2026 Samsun Open

Final
- Champion: (France) Gabriel Debru
- Runner-up: (France) Constantin Bittoun Kouzmine
- Score: 3–6, 7–5, 6–4

Events
Singles	men	women
Doubles	men	women
- Samsun Open

This was the first edition of the tournament.

Gabriel Debru won the title after defeating Constantin Bittoun Kouzmine 3–6, 7–5, 6–4 in the final.

== Seeds ==
1. (France) Dan Added (second round)
2. (France) Florent Bax (second round)
3. (United Kingdom) Max Basing (second round)
4. (Turkey) Yankı Erel (quarterfinals)
5. (Turkey) Mert Alkaya (first round)
6. (India) Manas Dhamne (quarterfinals)
7. (Bulgaria) Dimitar Kuzmanov (second round)
8. (Ukraine) Vadym Ursu (quarterfinals)

== Draw ==
Key

- Q = Qualifier
- WC = Wild card
- LL = Lucky loser
- Alt = Alternate
- ITF = ITF entry
- PR = Protected ranking
- SR = Special ranking
- SE = Special exempt
- JE = Junior exempt
- JR = Junior Accelerator Programme entrant
- CO = College Accelerator Programme entrant
- NG = Next Gen Accelerator Program entrant
- w/o = Walkover
- r = Retired
- d = Defaulted

=== Finals ===
Semifinals
Q	(Japan) Kenta Miyoshi	6	4	4
Q	(France) Constantin Bittoun Kouzmine	4	6	6
CO	(France) Paul Inchauspé	4	2
PR	(France) Gabriel Debru	6	6

Final
Q	(France) Constantin Bittoun Kouzmine	6	5	4
PR	(France) Gabriel Debru	3	7	6

=== Top half ===
First round
1	(France) D Added	7	2	6
(France) L Poullain	5	6	2
Q	(Japan) Kenta Miyoshi	6	6
Q	(Japan) S Nakagawa	2	2
(Kazakhstan) D Yevseyev	6^{5}	6	6
Q	(Turkey) T Duran	7^{7}	1	3
Q	(Turkey) MN Türker	2	3
8	(Ukraine) Vadym Ursu	6	6
3	(United Kingdom) M Basing	6	6
Alt	(India) Sidharth Rawat	3	1
Q	(France) C Bittoun Kouzmine	6	6
Alt	(Turkey) C İlkel	3	2
Q	(Turkey) Togan Tokaç	3	3
Semen Pankin	6	6
WC	(Turkey) K Kırcı	3	1
6	(India) M Dhamne	6	6

Second round
1	(France) D Added	6	3	4
Q	(Japan) K Miyoshi	3	6	6
(Kazakhstan) D Yevseyev	6	3	3
8	(Ukraine) V Ursu	4	6	6
3	(United Kingdom) M Basing	6	6^{7}	2
Q	(France) C Bittoun Kouzmine	0	7^{9}	6
S Pankin	2	6	5
6	(India) M Dhamne	6	1	7

Quarterfinals
Q	(Japan) K Miyoshi	6	6
8	(Ukraine) V Ursu	2	4
Q	(France) C Bittoun Kouzmine	6	7
6	(India) M Dhamne	4	5

Semifinals
Q	(Japan) K Miyoshi	6	4	4
Q	(France) C Bittoun Kouzmine	4	6	6

=== Bottom half ===
First round
7	(Bulgaria) D Kuzmanov	7	6
(Italy) A Binda	5	4
WC	(Turkey) E Kırkın	4	6^{3}
CO	(France) Paul Inchauspé	6	7^{7}
(Moldova) R Albot	6	6
(Lebanon) B Hassan	3	4
WC	(Turkey) A Azkara	4	4
4	(Turkey) Y Erel	6	6
5	(Turkey) Mert Alkaya	6	5	4
(Northern Mariana Islands) C Sinclair	0	7	6
(India) K Singh	4	4
(Japan) Koki Matsuda	6	6
(Romania) A Boitan	6	2	2
PR	(France) G Debru	4	6	6
(Japan) Takuya Kumasaka	6^{3}	3
2	(France) F Bax	7^{7}	6

Second round
7	(Bulgaria) D Kuzmanov	6	6^{4}	0
CO	(France) P Inchauspé	1	7^{7}	6
(Moldova) R Albot	1	7^{7}	4
4	(Turkey) Y Erel	6	6^{5}	6
(Northern Mariana Islands) C Sinclair	3	3
(Japan) K Matsuda	6	6
PR	(France) G Debru	6	3	6
2	(France) F Bax	4	6	2

Quarterfinals
CO	(France) P Inchauspé	3	6	6
4	(Turkey) Y Erel	6	3	4
(Japan) K Matsuda	6	6^{5}	3
PR	(France) G Debru	4	7^{7}	6

Semifinals
CO	(France) P Inchauspé	4	2
PR	(France) G Debru	6	6
