= 2024 Open Saint-Brieuc =

- Date: 14–20 October
- Edition: 19th
- Surface: Hard (indoor)
- Location: Saint-Brieuc, France

Champions

Singles
- (France) Benjamin Bonzi

Doubles
- (France) Geoffrey Blancaneaux / (France) Gabriel Debru
- Open Saint-Brieuc

The 2024 Open Saint-Brieuc Armor Agglomération was a professional tennis tournament played on hard courts. It was the 19th edition of the tournament which was part of the 2024 ATP Challenger Tour. It took place in Saint-Brieuc, France between 14 and 20 October 2024.

== Singles main-draw entrants ==
=== Seeds ===
Country	Player	Rank^{1}	Seed
FRA	Lucas Pouille	125	1
FRA	Grégoire Barrère	149	2
FRA	Titouan Droguet	166	3
FRA	Benjamin Bonzi	176	4
FRA	Valentin Royer	182	5
GBR	Paul Jubb	186	6
FRA	Matteo Martineau	204	7
FRA	Antoine Escoffier	210	8

- Rankings are as of 30 September 2024.

=== Other entrants ===
The following players received wildcards into the singles main draw:

- (France) Mathias Bourgue
- (France) Sascha Gueymard Wayenburg
- (France) Moïse Kouamé

The following players received entry into the singles main draw as alternates:

- (Lithuania) Ričardas Berankis
- (France) Clément Tabur

The following players received entry from the qualifying draw:

- (Switzerland) Mika Brunold
- (United Kingdom) Kyle Edmund
- (Switzerland) Jakub Paul
- (France) Lucas Poullain
- (Germany) Max Hans Rehberg
- (Czech Republic) Jiří Veselý

The following player received entry as a lucky loser:

- (France) Maxime Chazal

== Champions ==
=== Singles ===
- (France) Benjamin Bonzi def. (France) Lucas Pouille 6–2, 6–3.

=== Doubles ===
- (France) Geoffrey Blancaneaux / (France) Gabriel Debru def. (Switzerland) Jakub Paul / (Czech Republic) Matěj Vocel 3–3, defaulted.
