= 2024 Open Saint-Brieuc – Doubles =

Doubles
- 2024 Open Saint-Brieuc

Final
- Champions: (France) Geoffrey Blancaneaux (France) Gabriel Debru
- Runners-up: (Switzerland) Jakub Paul (Czech Republic) Matěj Vocel
- Score: 3–3, defaulted

Events
Singles	Doubles
- Open Saint-Brieuc

Dan Added and Albano Olivetti were the defending champions but chose not to defend their title.

Geoffrey Blancaneaux and Gabriel Debru won the title after Jakub Paul and Matěj Vocel were defaulted at 3–3 in the final.

== Seeds ==
1. (Serbia) Ivan Sabanov / (Serbia) Matej Sabanov (quarterfinals)
2. (Switzerland) Jakub Paul / (Czech Republic) Matěj Vocel (final, defaulted)
3. (Bulgaria) Anthony Genov / (Romania) Bogdan Pavel (quarterfinals)
4. (Czech Republic) Filip Duda / (Czech Republic) David Poljak (quarterfinals)

== Draw ==
Key

- Q = Qualifier
- WC = Wild card
- LL = Lucky loser
- Alt = Alternate
- ITF = ITF entry
- PR = Protected ranking
- SR = Special ranking
- SE = Special exempt
- JE = Junior exempt
- JR = Junior Accelerator Programme entrant
- CO = College Accelerator Programme entrant
- NG = Next Gen Accelerator Program entrant
- w/o = Walkover
- r = Retired
- d = Defaulted

=== Draw ===
First round
(Croatia) Z Babić (France) R Bertrand	2	3
(France) M Chazal (Syria) H Naw	6	6
(France) G Blancaneaux (France) G Debru	7	6
(United Kingdom) Liam Hignett (United Kingdom) J MacKinlay	5	3
(France) C Chidekh (France) L Sanchez	6	7
WC	(France) G Barrère (France) Victor Barrère	3	5
(United Kingdom) S Parker (Romania) Dan Alexandru Tomescu	4	1
4	(Czech Republic) F Duda (Czech Republic) D Poljak	6	6
WC	(France) B Bonzi (France) S Gueymard Wayenburg	6	6
(France) T Lamasine (France) M Martineau	3	4

Quarterfinals
1	(Serbia) I Sabanov (Serbia) M Sabanov	4	4
(France) M Chazal (Syria) H Naw	6	6
3	(Bulgaria) A Genov (Romania) B Pavel	3	6^{2}
(France) G Blancaneaux (France) G Debru	6	7^{7}
(France) C Chidekh (France) L Sanchez	6	4	[10]
4	(Czech Republic) F Duda (Czech Republic) D Poljak	2	6	[5]
WC	(France) B Bonzi (France) S Gueymard Wayenburg	4	7^{7}	[7]
2	(Switzerland) J Paul (Czech Republic) M Vocel	6	6^{0}	[10]

Semifinals
(France) M Chazal (Syria) H Naw	3	3
(France) G Blancaneaux (France) G Debru	6	6
(France) C Chidekh (France) L Sanchez	5	4
2	(Switzerland) J Paul (Czech Republic) M Vocel	7	6

Final
(France) G Blancaneaux (France) G Debru	3
2	(Switzerland) J Paul (Czech Republic) M Vocel	3^{d}
