= 2023 Città di Como Challenger – Singles =

Singles
- 2023 Città di Como Challenger

Final
- Champion: (Brazil) Thiago Seyboth Wild
- Runner-up: (Spain) Pedro Martínez
- Score: 5–7, 6–2, 6–3

Events
Singles	Doubles
- Città di Como Challenger

Cedrik-Marcel Stebe was the defending champion but chose not to defend his title.

Thiago Seyboth Wild won the title after defeating Pedro Martínez 5–7, 6–2, 6–3 in the final.

== Seeds ==
1. (Brazil) Thiago Seyboth Wild (champion)
2. (Hungary) Zsombor Piros (second round)
3. (Brazil) Thiago Monteiro (first round)
4. (France) Benoît Paire (semifinals)
5. (Spain) Pedro Martínez (final)
6. (Italy) Flavio Cobolli (first round)
7. (Italy) Fabio Fognini (second round, retired)
8. Ivan Gakhov (second round, retired)

== Draw ==
Key

- Q = Qualifier
- WC = Wild card
- LL = Lucky loser
- Alt = Alternate
- ITF = ITF entry
- PR = Protected ranking
- SR = Special ranking
- SE = Special exempt
- JE = Junior exempt
- JR = Junior Accelerator Programme entrant
- CO = College Accelerator Programme entrant
- NG = Next Gen Accelerator Program entrant
- w/o = Walkover
- r = Retired
- d = Defaulted

=== Finals ===
Semifinals
1	(Brazil) Thiago Seyboth Wild	7	6
4	(France) Benoît Paire	5	3
WC	(Italy) Stefano Napolitano	2	6^{4}
5	(Spain) Pedro Martínez	6	7^{7}

Final
1	(Brazil) Thiago Seyboth Wild	5	6	6
5	(Spain) Pedro Martínez	7	2	3

=== Top half ===
First round
1	(Brazil) T Seyboth Wild	6	6
(Italy) F Agamenone	3	4
Alt	(Spain) N Sánchez Izquierdo	3	7	3
Alt	(Austria) L Neumayer	6	5	6
(Netherlands) J Sels	2	2
(Italy) A Giannessi	6	6
(Germany) R Molleker	6	6
6	(Italy) F Cobolli	3	3
4	(France) B Paire	6	6
Q	(France) C Hemery	1	0
(Bosnia and Herzegovina) N Fatić	2	4
WC	(Italy) Lorenzo Carboni	6	6
(Bulgaria) D Kuzmanov	6	6
Q	(Serbia) M Zekić	2	3
(United States) A Martin	4	1
8	I Gakhov	6	6

Second round
1	(Brazil) T Seyboth Wild	6	6
Alt	(Austria) L Neumayer	3	4
(Italy) A Giannessi	3	1
(Germany) R Molleker	6	6
4	(France) B Paire	5	6	3
WC	(Italy) L Carboni	7	2	0^{r}
(Bulgaria) D Kuzmanov	6	2
8	I Gakhov	2	0^{r}

Quarterfinals
1	(Brazil) T Seyboth Wild	6	6
(Germany) R Molleker	1	3
4	(France) B Paire	4	6	6
(Bulgaria) D Kuzmanov	6	4	3

Semifinals
1	(Brazil) T Seyboth Wild	7	6
4	(France) B Paire	5	3

=== Bottom half ===
First round
7/WC	(Italy) F Fognini	3	6	6
(South Korea) G Campaña Lee	6	4	0
(Italy) M Gigante	3	0
WC	(Italy) S Napolitano	6	6
Q	(France) M Bourgue	7	6
(Croatia) D Ajduković	5	1
Alt	(Italy) L Darderi	6	6
3	(Brazil) T Monteiro	3	2
5	(Spain) P Martínez	6	6
(Italy) Edoardo Lavagno	0	1
Q	(France) V Royer	6	3	4
Q	(Italy) Samuel Vincent Ruggeri	3	6	6
(India) S Nagal	6	0	7^{7}
(Italy) R Bonadio	4	6	6^{4}
Q	(Germany) L Wessels	2	4
2	(Hungary) Z Piros	6	6

Second round
7/WC	(Italy) F Fognini	5	0^{r}
WC	(Italy) S Napolitano	7	3
Q	(France) M Bourgue	6^{2}	2
Alt	(Italy) L Darderi	7^{7}	6
5	(Spain) P Martínez	6	7^{7}
Q	(Italy) S Vincent Ruggeri	4	6^{4}
(India) S Nagal	6	6
2	(Hungary) Z Piros	3	4

Quarterfinals
WC	(Italy) S Napolitano	6	2	6
Alt	(Italy) L Darderi	3	6	3
5	(Spain) P Martínez	6	6
(India) S Nagal	4	4

Semifinals
WC	(Italy) S Napolitano	2	6^{4}
5	(Spain) P Martínez	6	7^{7}
