= 2024 Città di Como Challenger =

- Date: 26 August – 1 September
- Edition: 18th
- Surface: Clay
- Location: Como, Italy

Champions

Singles
- (France) Gabriel Debru

Doubles
- (Romania) Victor Vlad Cornea / (Ukraine) Denys Molchanov
- Città di Como Challenger

The 2024 Città di Como Challenger was a professional tennis tournament played on clay courts. It was the 18th edition of the tournament which was part of the 2024 ATP Challenger Tour. It took place in Como, Italy between 26 August and 1 September 2024.

== Singles main-draw entrants ==
=== Seeds ===
Country	Player	Rank^{1}	Seed
SVK	Jozef Kovalík	114	1
ITA	Stefano Napolitano	136	2
BRA	Gustavo Heide	142	3
ITA	Francesco Passaro	147	4
~~PER~~	~~Juan Pablo Varillas~~	~~158~~	~~5~~
KAZ	Dmitry Popko	184	6
LIB	Benjamin Hassan	194	7
HUN	Zsombor Piros	211	8

- ^{1} Rankings are as of 19 August 2024.

=== Other entrants ===
The following players received wildcards into the singles main draw:

- (Italy) Federico Bondioli
- (Italy) Raúl Brancaccio
- (Italy) Marco Cecchinato

The following player received entry into the singles main draw using a protected ranking:

- (Japan) Kei Nishikori

The following players received entry into the singles main draw as alternates:

- (Slovakia) Alex Molčan
- (Czech Republic) Andrew Paulson

The following players received entry from the qualifying draw:

- (Argentina) Valerio Aboian
- (Georgia (country)) Nikoloz Basilashvili
- Svyatoslav Gulin
- (Brazil) Matheus Pucinelli de Almeida
- (Germany) Max Hans Rehberg
- (Ukraine) Vitaliy Sachko

The following player received entry as a lucky loser:

- (Italy) Alexander Weis

== Champions ==
=== Singles ===
- (France) Gabriel Debru def. (Peru) Ignacio Buse 6–1, 2–6, 6–3.

=== Doubles ===
- (Romania) Victor Vlad Cornea / (Ukraine) Denys Molchanov def. (Romania) Alexandru Jecan / Ivan Liutarevich 6–2, 6–3.
