= Ayla Aksu =

Turkish-American tennis player (born 1996)

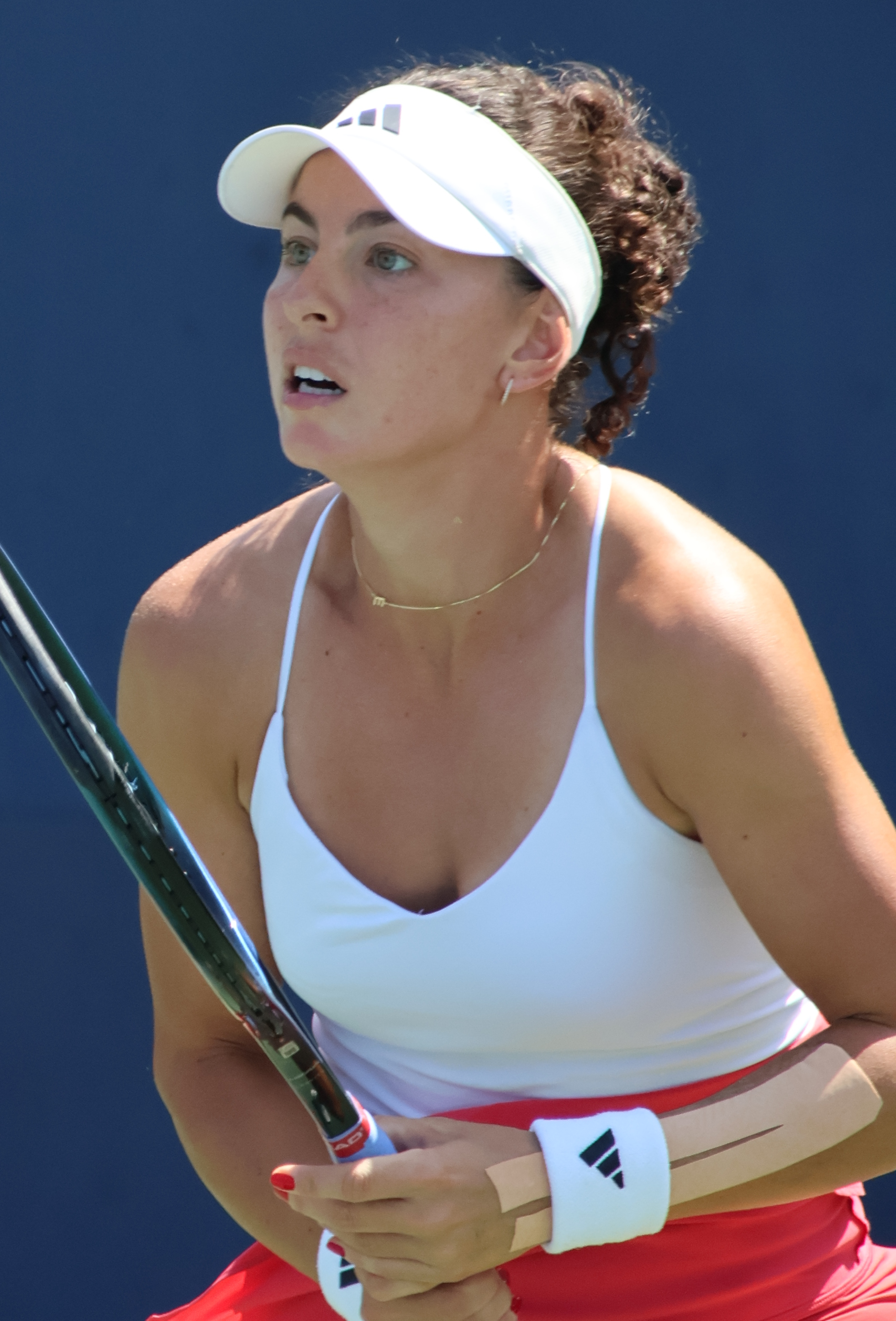
- Aksu at the 2026 US Open
- Country (sports): Turkey (2010–2012; 2014–present); United States (2013)
- Born: 15 July 1996 (age 30) San Francisco, California
- Height: 1.70 m (5 ft 7 in)
- Plays: Right (two-handed backhand)
- Prize money: $284,636

Singles
- Career record: 383–257
- Career titles: 1 WTA 125
- Highest ranking: No. 156 (12 October 2026)
- Current ranking: No. 156 (12 October 2026)

Grand Slam singles results
- US Open: Q1 (2026)

Doubles
- Career record: 173–126
- Career titles: 16 ITF
- Highest ranking: No. 199 (11 June 2018)
- Current ranking: No. 1,103 (12 October 2026)
- Last updated on: 12 October 2026.

Ayla Aksu (born 15 July 1996) is a Turkish tennis player. She has a career-high singles ranking of world No. 156, achieved on 12 October 2026, and a best WTA doubles ranking of No. 199, set on 11 June 2018.

Aksu has won one WTA 125 singles title. Competing for Turkey in the Billie Jean King Cup, she has a win-loss record of 5–9.

== Early life ==
Growing up in Sacramento, California, Aksu looked up to Serena Williams, Maria Sharapova, and Çağla Büyükakçay.

== Career ==
Aksu made her WTA Tour main-draw debut at the 2015 İstanbul Cup, in the doubles event, partnering Melis Sezer. In the quarterfinals, the pair was defeated by the Serbian/Turkish team of Jelena Janković and Çağla Büyükakçay in straight sets.

She reached her first WTA 125 final at the 2026 Figueira da Foz Ladies Open in Portugal but lost to third seed Darja Vidmanova.

Aksu won her maiden WTA 125 singles title at the 2026 Samsun Open in Turkey, defeating eighth seed Lucrezia Stefanini in the final.

== Nationality change ==
Aksu represented Turkey from 2010 to 2012, before choosing to represent the United States in 2013, but switched back to Turkey in 2014.

== WTA 125 finals ==
=== Singles: 2 (1 title, 1 runner-up) ===
Result	W–L	Date	Tournament	Surface	Opponents	Score
Loss	0–1	Jun 2026	Figueira da Foz Open, Portugal	Hard	(Czech Republic) Darja Viďmanová	2–6, 3–6
Win	1–1	Oct 2026	Samsun Open, Turkey	Hard	(Italy) Lucrezia Stefanini	7–5, 2–6, 6–2

== ITF Circuit finals ==
=== Singles: 27 (14 titles, 13 runner-ups) ===
Legend W60/75 tournaments W25/35 tournaments W10/15 tournaments	Finals by surface Hard (12–8) Clay (2–5)

Result	W–L	Date	Tournament	Tier	Surface	Opponent	Score
Win	1–0	Jun 2015	ITF Adana, Turkey	W10	Hard	(France) Carla Touly	3–6, 6–3, 7–6^{(3)}
Loss	1–1	Aug 2015	ITF İstanbul, Turkey	W10	Hard	(Turkey) Melis Sezer	5–7, 6–7^{(4)}
Win	2–1	Aug 2015	Bursa Cup, Turkey	W10	Hard	(Bolivia) María Fernanda Álvarez	6–3, 6–1
Win	3–1	Aug 2015	ITF Izmir, Turkey	W10	Hard	(Israel) Keren Shlomo	2–6, 6–4, 6–4
Loss	3–2	Dec 2015	ITF Antalya, Turkey	W10	Clay	(Georgia (country)) Ekaterine Gorgodze	4–6, 2–6
Win	4–2	May 2016	ITF Antalya, Turkey	W10	Hard	(Bulgaria) Julia Stamatova	6–4, 6–1
Win	5–2	May 2016	ITF Antalya, Turkey	W10	Hard	(United States) Sarah Lee	6–1, 4–6, 7–6^{(1)}
Win	6–2	Jun 2016	ITF Antalya, Turkey	W10	Hard	(Romania) Raluca Șerban	6–3, 6–3
Win	7–2	Oct 2016	ITF Antalya, Turkey	W10	Hard	(Hungary) Ágnes Bukta	6–4, 2–6, 7–5
Win	8–2	Oct 2016	ITF Antalya, Turkey	W10	Hard	(Hungary) Ágnes Bukta	7–5, 6–2
Win	9–2	Nov 2016	ITF Antalya, Turkey	W10	Hard	(Germany) Tayisiya Morderger	7–5, 6–1
Loss	9–3	Mar 2017	ITF Antalya, Turkey	W15	Clay	(Romania) Andreea Mitu	2–6, 3–6
Loss	9–4	Mar 2017	ITF Antalya, Turkey	W15	Clay	(Georgia (country)) Sofia Shapatava	6–2, 6–7^{(3)}, 6–7^{(5)}
Loss	9–5	Mar 2017	ITF İstanbul, Turkey	W15	Hard (i)	(United Kingdom) Katie Boulter	3–6, 6–3, 3–6
Loss	9–6	Jul 2017	ITF İstanbul, Turkey	W15	Clay	(United States) Sanaz Marand	1–6, 4–6
Loss	9–7	Aug 2017	ITF El Espinar, Spain	W25	Hard	(Spain) Paula Badosa	2–6, 4–6
Loss	9–8	Aug 2017	Mençuna Cup, Turkey	W60	Hard	(Russia) Valeria Savinykh	6–3, 6–7^{(10)}, 6–7^{(5)}
Win	10–8	Nov 2018	ITF Antalya, Turkey	W15	Hard	(Guatemala) Kirsten-Andrea Weedon	7–5, 6–1
Win	11–8	Oct 2021	ITF Monastir, Tunisia	W15	Hard	(Thailand) Pimrada Jattavapornvanit	6–3, 6–4
Loss	11–9	Dec 2022	ITF Sharm El Sheikh, Egypt	W15	Hard	(France) Nahia Berecoechea	2–6, 3–6
Loss	11–10	Aug 2023	ITF Malmö, Sweden	W25	Clay	(Netherlands) Suzan Lamens	1–6, 4–6
Loss	11–11	Dec 2023	ITF Monastir, Tunisia	W25	Hard	(Croatia) Antonia Ružić	6–3, 4–6, 5–7
Win	12–11	Apr 2024	ITF Santa Margherita di Pula, Italy	W35	Clay	(Czech Republic) Lucie Havlíčková	w/o
Win	13–11	Aug 2024	ITF Collonge–Bellerive, Switzerland	W35	Clay	(Burundi) Sada Nahimana	3–6, 6–1, 6–4
Loss	13–12	Oct 2024	Open de Touraine, France	W35	Hard (i)	Yuliya Hatouka	6–7^{(4)}, 6–7^{(8)}
Loss	13–13	Oct 2024	ITF Istanbul, Turkiye	W35	Hard (i)	(Romania) Patricia Maria Țig	3–6, 6–7^{(4)}
Win	14–13	Feb 2026	Porto Indoor, Portugal	W75	Hard (i)	(Bulgaria) Elizara Yaneva	7–5, 6–4

=== Doubles: 29 (16 titles, 13 runner-ups) ===
Legend W60/75 tournaments W25/35 tournaments W10/15 tournaments	Finals by surface Hard (13–10) Clay (3–3)

Result	W–L	Date	Tournament	Tier	Surface	Partner	Opponents	Score
Win	1–0	Jun 2014	ITF İstanbul, Turkey	W10	Hard	(Turkey) İpek Soylu	(Belgium) Elke Lemmens (Bulgaria) Julia Stamatova	4–6, 6–3, [10–4]
Loss	1–1	Oct 2014	ITF İstanbul	W25	Hard (i)	(Turkey) Müge Topsel	(Switzerland) Xenia Knoll (Turkey) İpek Soylu	2–6, 4–6
Loss	1–2	Dec 2014	ITF İstanbul	W10	Hard (i)	(Turkey) İpek Soylu	(Croatia) Jana Fett (Croatia) Adrijana Lekaj	3–6, 4–6
Loss	1–3	Feb 2015	ITF Sharm El Sheikh, Egypt	W10	Hard	(Turkey) Müge Topsel	(Russia) Anna Morgina (Bulgaria) Julia Terziyska	1–6, 6–4, [2–10]
Win	2–3	Mar 2015	ITF Antalya, Turkey	W10	Hard	(Turkey) Melis Sezer	(Belgium) Dorien Cuypers (Venezuela) Aymet Uzcategui	6–2, 6–4
Win	3–3	May 2015	ITF Antalya	W10	Hard	(Turkey) Melis Sezer	(Venezuela) Mariaryeni Gutiérrez (Spain) María Martínez Martínez	7–5, 6–2
Win	4–3	Jun 2015	ITF Adana, Turkey	W10	Hard	(Turkey) Melis Sezer	(Turkey) Cemre Anıl (Russia) Vasilisa Aponasenko	6–1, 6–3
Win	5–3	Jun 2015	ITF Adana	W10	Hard	(Turkey) Melis Sezer	(Norway) Emma Flood (Sweden) Anette Munozova	6–7^{(5)}, 6–4, [10–3]
Win	6–3	Jun 2015	ITF Balıkesir, Turkey	W10	Hard	(Turkey) Melis Sezer	(Romania) Cristina Adamescu (Turkey) Cemre Anıl	6–3, 6–2
Loss	6–4	Aug 2015	ITF Izmir, Turkey	W10	Hard	(Uzbekistan) Arina Folts	(Germany) Julia Wachaczyk (Germany) Nora Niedmers	6–7^{(4)}, 4–6
Win	7–4	Sep 2015	ITF Antalya, Turkey	W10	Hard	(Bulgaria) Julia Stamatova	(Slovakia) Tamara Kupková (Russia) Elina Nepliy	7–5, 6–3
Loss	7–5	Oct 2015	ITF Antalya	W10	Hard	(Bosnia and Herzegovina) Anita Husarić	(Slovakia) Vivien Juhászová (Belarus) Aryna Sabalenka	1–6, 3–6
Win	8–5	Apr 2016	ITF Antalya	W10	Hard	(Turkey) Melis Sezer	(Bulgaria) Viktoriya Tomova (Ukraine) Anastasiya Vasylyeva	6–3, 6–3
Loss	8–6	May 2016	ITF Antalya	W10	Hard	(Bulgaria) Julia Stamatova	(United States) Emina Bektas (United States) Sarah Lee	0–6, 3–6
Win	9–6	Aug 2016	ITF Arad, Romania	W10	Clay	(Slovakia) Chantal Škamlová	(Turkey) Yasmin Gülman (Romania) Camelia Hristea	6–4, 6–2
Win	10–6	Nov 2016	ITF Antalya, Turkey	W10	Hard	(Turkey) Melis Sezer	(Bulgaria) Dia Evtimova (Estonia) Valeria Gorlats	6–1, 7–6^{(5)}
Win	11–6	Feb 2017	ITF Antalya	W15	Clay	(Georgia (country)) Ekaterine Gorgodze	(Turkey) Başak Eraydın (Switzerland) Karin Kennel	6–3, 6–1
Win	12–6	Jun 2017	Figueira da Foz Open, Portugal	W25	Hard	(Romania) Raluca Șerban	(Colombia) María Herazo González (Mexico) Victoria Rodríguez	6–4, 6–1
Loss	12–7	Aug 2017	ITF El Espinar, Spain	W25	Hard	(Netherlands) Bibiane Schoofs	(United States) Quinn Gleason (Brazil) Luisa Stefani	3–6, 2–6
Win	13–7	Oct 2017	Lagos Open, Nigeria	W25	Hard	(Montenegro) Ana Veselinović	(Switzerland) Conny Perrin (Ukraine) Valeriya Strakhova	6–4, 6–2
Win	14–7	Apr 2018	Lale Cup Istanbul, Turkey	W60	Hard	(United Kingdom) Harriet Dart	(Russia) Anastasia Potapova (Russia) Olga Doroshina	6–4, 7–6^{(3)}
Loss	14–8	Dec 2019	ITF Antalya, Turkey	W15	Hard	(Turkey) Gizem Melisa Ateş	(Romania) Georgia Crăciun (Turkey) Başak Eraydın	1–6, 2–6
Loss	14–9	Jan 2021	ITF Antalya	W15	Clay	(Bulgaria) Ani Vangelova	(Slovenia) Pia Lovrič (Hungary) Adrienn Nagy	4–6, 5–7
Loss	14–10	May 2021	ITF Tbilisi, Georgia	W15	Hard	(Russia) Valeriia Olianovskaia	(Switzerland) Jenny Dürst (Poland) Weronika Falkowska	3–6, 2–6
Loss	14–11	May 2023	ITF Bodrum, Turkiye	W60	Hard	(United Kingdom) Harriet Dart	(Romania) Oana Gavrilă (Netherlands) Isabelle Haverlag	4–6, 6–7^{(3)}
Loss	14–12	Jul 2023	Amstelveen Open, Netherlands	W60	Clay	(Croatia) Ena Kajevic	(Germany) Noma Noha Akugue (Luxembourg) Marie Weckerle	5–7, 3–6
Win	15–12	Jan 2025	Open Andrézieux-Bouthéon, France	W75	Hard (i)	Yuliya Hatouka	(Switzerland) Conny Perrin (Netherlands) Lian Tran	5–7, 6–4, [14–12]
Loss	15–13	Mar 2025	ITF Helsinki, Finland	W35	Hard (i)	(Poland) Martyna Kubka	(Finland) Laura Hietaranta (United Kingdom) Ella McDonald	3–6, 4–6
Win	16–13	May 2025	ITF Kuršumlijska Banja, Serbia	W75	Clay	(Czech Republic) Anna Sisková	(United Kingdom) Freya Christie (Kazakhstan) Zhibek Kulambayeva	6–4, 6–2
