= Thiago Seyboth Wild =

Brazilian tennis player (born 2000)

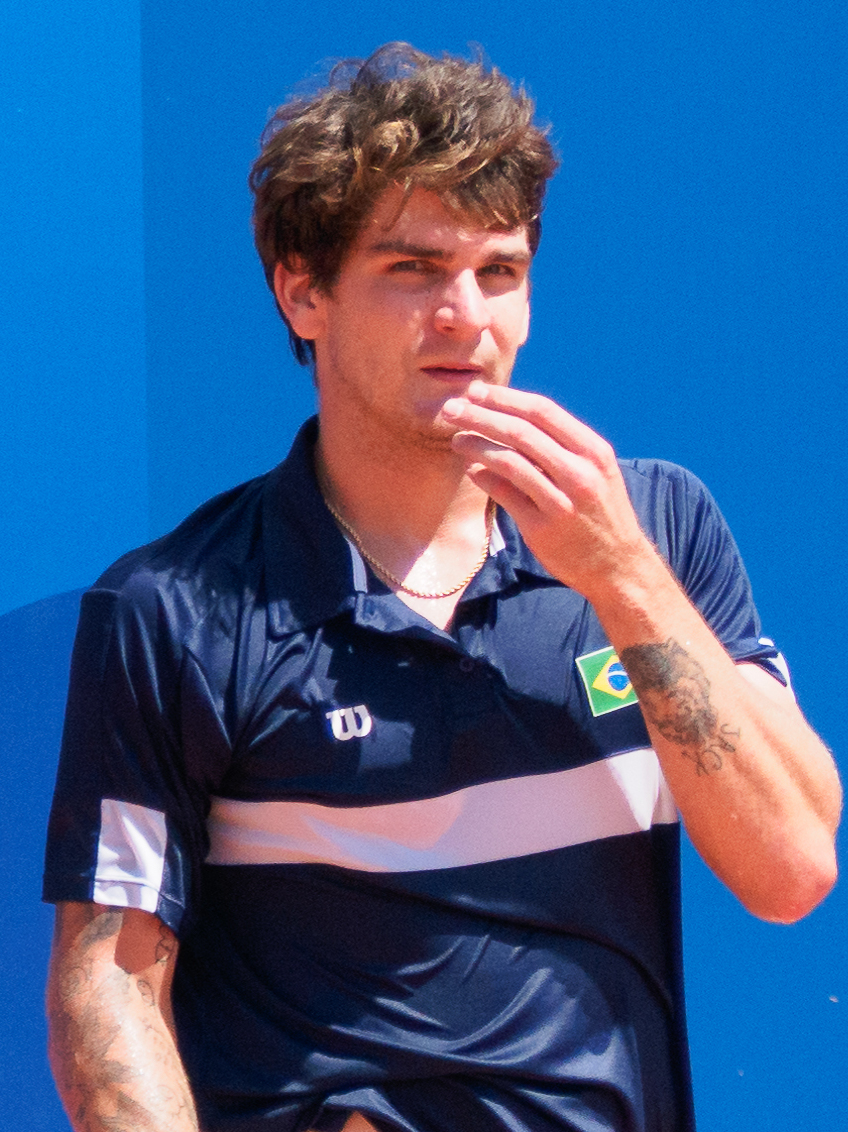
- Seyboth Wild at the 2024 Summer Olympics
- Country (sports): Brazil
- Residence: Buenos Aires, Argentina
- Born: 10 March 2000 (age 26) Marechal Cândido Rondon, Paraná, Brazil
- Height: 1.85 m (6 ft 1 in)
- Turned pro: 2018
- Plays: Right-handed (two-handed backhand)
- Coach: Carlos Eduardo Matos
- Prize money: US $2,587,546

Singles
- Career record: 39–57
- Career titles: 1
- Highest ranking: No. 58 (20 May 2024)
- Current ranking: No. 98 (9 November 2026)

Grand Slam singles results
- Australian Open: 1R (2024, 2025)
- French Open: 3R (2023)
- Wimbledon: 2R (2024)
- US Open: 1R (2020, 2024)

Other tournaments
- Olympic Games: 1R (2024)

Doubles
- Career record: 8–15
- Career titles: 0
- Highest ranking: No. 197 (22 May 2023)

Grand Slam doubles results
- Australian Open: 1R (2024)
- French Open: 2R (2024)
- Wimbledon: 1R (2024)
- US Open: 1R (2024)

Other doubles tournaments
- Olympic Games: 2R (2024)

Other mixed doubles tournaments
- Olympic Games: 1R (2024)
- Last updated on: 12 October 2026.

Thiago Seyboth Wild (Portuguese pronunciation: [tʃiˈaɡu ˈzajbutʃ(i) ˈviwdʒ(i)]; born 10 March 2000) is a Brazilian professional tennis player. He has a career-high ATP singles ranking of world No. 58 achieved on 20 May 2024 and a doubles ranking of No. 197, reached on 22 May 2023. He is currently the No. 3 singles player from Brazil.

In March 2020, at just 19 years old, Seyboth Wild won his first ATP Tour title at 2020 Chile Open, defeating second seed Casper Ruud in the final. Then he became the youngest Brazilian ATP titlist until João Fonseca's trophy at 2025 Argentina Open.

== Early life ==
Seyboth Wild was born on 10 March 2000 in the municipality of Marechal Cândido Rondon of Paraná in the Southern Region of Brazil. His father, Claudio Ricardo Wild, manages several tennis academies in Brazil, and his mother, Gisela Christine Seyboth, is a dentist. Had he not continued to pursue a career in tennis, he said that he would like to follow in his mother's footsteps as a doctor; he studied biomedicine and administration prior and hopes to continue pursuing his degree in the future. Seyboth Wild has a sister, Luana. Seyboth Wild is of paternal Romanian and Russian descent, whereas his mother is of German heritage.

Through his mother, Seyboth Wild is the great-great-grandson of Dietrich Klagges, an early member of the Nazi Party. Brazilian newspaper O Globo reported in 2023 that Seyboth Wild had boasted to his former girlfriend through WhatsApp about his family's connection to Adolf Hitler, writing, "My [great-]great-grandfather ... was Hitler’s predecessor .... He was the one who brought him over from Austria and taught Hitler the life."

After beginning to play tennis at the age of 4 with the assistance of his father, Seyboth Wild moved to Rio de Janeiro at the age of 14 to begin a career professionally. "I feel happy on the court. It's the place I'm supposed to be. The court gives me limits, but at the same time it gives me the space and inspiration to do what I like. Tennis allows me to be myself and express myself on court." Seyboth Wild commented on the sport.

== Junior tennis ==
Seyboth Wild had good results on the ITF junior circuit, maintaining a 88–36 singles win-loss record.

Seyboth Wild became the second Brazilian to win a junior Grand Slam, at the 2018 US Open, on 9 September, joining Tiago Fernandes. He also made the junior semifinal at the Roland Garros, and at the doubles of US Open and French Open.

He reached an ITF junior combined ranking of world No. 8 on 22 January 2018.

== Professional career ==
=== 2018: ATP Tour debut ===
Seyboth Wild made his ATP main draw debut at the 2018 Brasil Open after receiving a wildcard into the singles main draw.

=== 2019: First ATP Challenger title ===
On 3 November 2019, at the age of 19, he won his first Challenger in Guayaquil, entering the top 300 in the world for the first time. With the title, he jumped to the 235th place in the world ranking, and became the third best tennis player in Brazil at the moment, behind only Thiago Monteiro and João Menezes.

=== 2020: First ATP Main Tour title, Top 125 and Major debuts ===
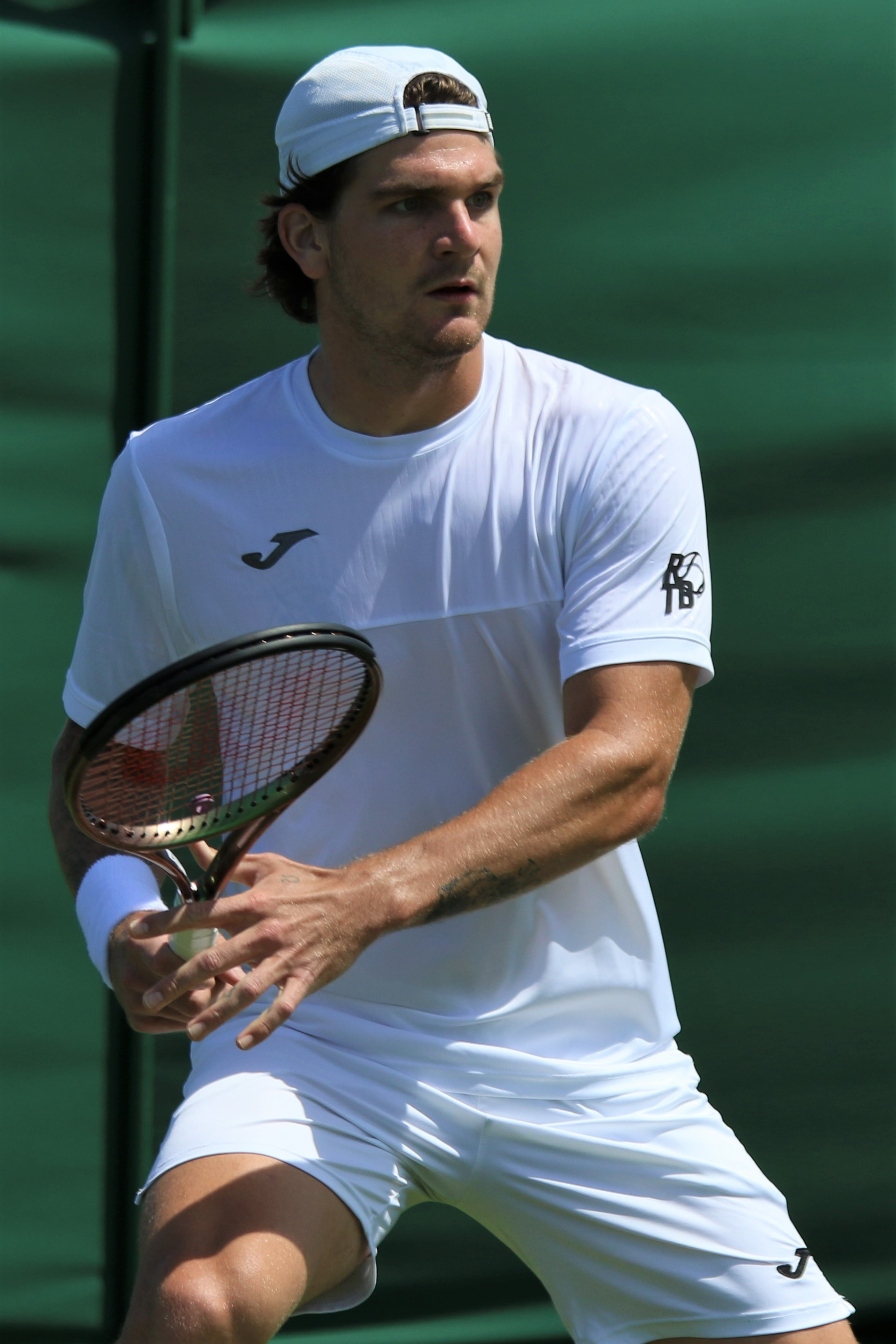
Wild, 2022.

In February 2020, he received wildcard to participate in the ATP 500 in Rio de Janeiro, where he defeated the Spaniard top 100 Alejandro Davidovich Fokina in three sets (5–7, 7–6 ^{(7–3)} and 7–5) in the first round, in the longest match in the history of the tournament (3 hours and 49 minutes). In the next round, he faced world number 32 Borna Ćorić, losing in the third set tiebreak. With this result, he entered the world top 200 for the first time on 24 February, moving up to ranking No. 182.

In the following week, invited as a wildcard to the ATP 250 in Santiago, Wild had his best campaign: he defeated Facundo Bagnis, Juan Ignacio Londero (world No. 63) and in the quarterfinals, the top seed of the tournament, and champion of the Rio Open, the Chilean world No. 18 Cristian Garín, who retired after losing the first set in a tiebreak. In the semifinals he defeated Renzo Olivo in straight sets becoming the youngest Brazilian to reach a final at this level, surpassing the achievements of former world No. 1 Gustavo Kuerten, then aged 20, and of Jaime Oncins and Thomaz Bellucci, at 21 years old. He also became the first Brazilian to compete in an ATP level final since Bellucci was runner-up in Houston in April 2017. In the final, he defeated Norwegian Casper Ruud (ranked No. 38 and champion of the Argentina Open two weeks before), in three sets, becoming the youngest Brazilian champion at 19 years old, surpassing Kuerten, who won his first ATP title at the age of 20. He became the first player born in the 2000s to win an ATP Tour title. Wild was also the youngest tennis player to win a title in the Latin American clay court swing since Rafael Nadal won Acapulco in 2005, at the age of 18. Wild climbed up 69 positions, reaching a career high ATP singles ranking of No. 113, becoming the second-highest ranked tennis player in Brazil.

In March, Seyboth Wild became the first professional tennis player to announce a diagnosis of COVID-19. He was investigated for an alleged breach of quarantine prior to receiving the test results. After the season was stopped for a few months due to the COVID-19 pandemic, he made his Major debut at the US Open. In September, Seyboth Wild participated in the Challenger 125 in Aix-en-Provence, France, reaching the final.

=== 2023: Maiden doubles final, four Challenger titles, top 75 debut ===
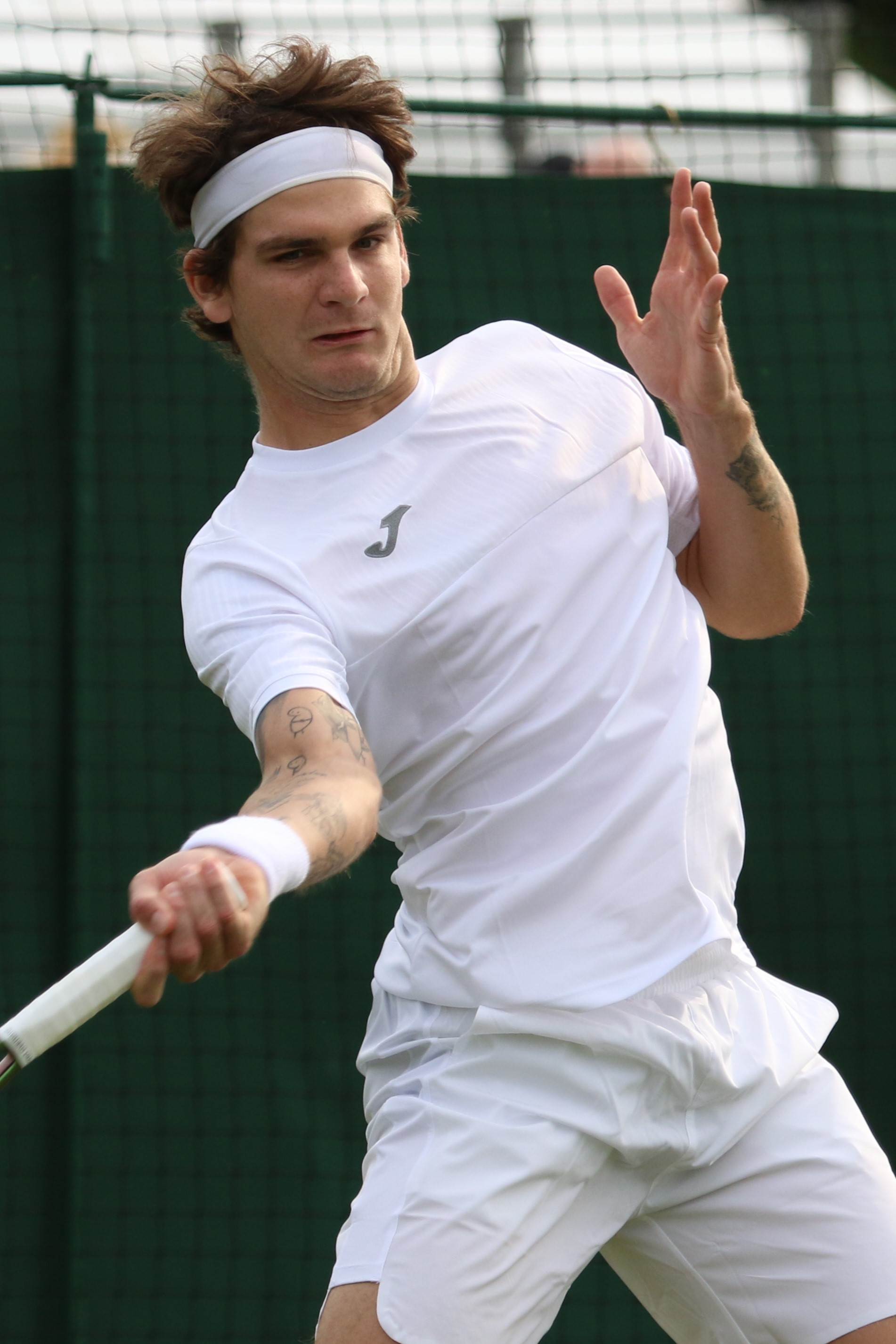
Wild, 2023.

After two years of having poor results, in March, Wild reached the final of the Challenger in Santiago, losing to Hugo Dellien, and the following week, he won the Challenger in Vina del Mar, defeating top seed Hugo Gaston and returning to the top 230 in the singles rankings on 20 March 2023.

He also reached the doubles final at the 2023 Chile Open partnering Matías Soto. As a result, he reached a new career best doubles ranking of No. 230 on 20 March 2023.

In April, Wild won the Buenos Aires Challenger in singles and doubles. With that, he returned to the world top 200 in singles, and entered the world top 200 in doubles for the first time.

In May, participating in the Piemonte Open, which is an ATP Challenger Tour 175 event, he reached the quarterfinals losing to the top seed and top-50 player, Argentine Sebastián Báez, in three sets.

Ranked No. 172, Wild qualified for Roland Garros for the first time. He entered the tournament qualifications as one of the lowest ranked players. He won his three matches against Antoine Bellier, Ričardas Berankis and Dominik Koepfer losing only one set. He upset world No. 2 and second seed Daniil Medvedev in a five-set match to advance to the second round, earning the biggest win of his career. After the defeat, Medvedev said of Wild that "if he keeps playing like this, he will be among the top 30 in the world." Next he defeated former top 20 Guido Pella to move to the third round of a Major for the first time in his career. In the third round, facing the 27th seed Japanese Yoshihito Nishioka, Wild was leading two sets to 1, but succumbed to fatigue, being eliminated in 3 sets to 2.

Competing as unranked in the post-Roland Garros Grass tournaments, Wild made his preparation and entered the Wimbledon qualifying tournament, while fighting for the No. 1 spot in Brazil, over Felipe Meligeni Alves and Thiago Monteiro. He defeated Jelle Sels and Pierre-Hugues Herbert, but in the last round of qualifying, faced Tomás Barrios Vera. At the beginning of the fifth and final set, he suffered a slight sprain in his ankle that cost him his place in the main draw of Wimbledon. Wild then decided to compete on clay in the Challenger in Karlsruhe, Germany.

After reaching the quarterfinals in Karlsruhe, and the semifinals of the Challenger 125 in Braunschweig, both in Germany, Wild became the No. 1 Brazilian tennis player for the first time, surpassing Thiago Monteiro, who spent five years in this position.

Wild broke into the world top 100 for the first time, when he won the Challenger in Como, Italy. He defeated former top 20 Benoît Paire in the semifinal and former top-40 Pedro Martínez in the final, winning his fourth career Challenger title and third of the year.

The following week, playing in the Challenger 125 in Genoa, Wild won his second Challenger in a row and the fourth of the year, defeating former world top 10 Fabio Fognini in the final and becoming the tennis player with the most Challenger titles in 2023 to date.

As a result of those two Challenger titles he reached world No. 76, climbing 30 spots in the rankings on 11 September 2023.

In the final stretch of the 2023 season, he played four ATPs on fast indoor courts (Stockholm, Basel, Paris-Bercy and Metz), a first in his career, aiming to evolve and better adapt to this type of court.

=== 2024: First ATP 500 quarterfinal, Masters wins and third round, top 60 ===
Wild entered the Australian Open main draw for the first time in his life, having been drawn to face the fifth seed, Andrey Rublev. Wild took the match to a tie-break in the fifth set which he lost to Rublev, in a game lasting almost 4 hours.

At 2024 Rio Open, Wild reached the quarterfinals of an ATP 500 for the first time, beating Alejandro Tabilo and Jaume Munar. Facing the second seed and defending champion, world No. 23 Cameron Norrie, Wild still managed to win a set, but ended up being eliminated in three sets. As a result, he reached his personal best ranking, No. 73 in the world, at the end of February.

Following his first round Román Andrés Burruchaga at the ATP 250 2024 Chile Open, he entered the top 70 for the first time in his career.

Ranked No. 65 in the world, Wild entered the Masters 1000, 2024 BNP Paribas Open in Indian Wells as the top seed in the qualifying competition. After winning his two qualifying matches, he entered the main draw facing American J. J. Wolf, where Wild won in straight sets, recording his first win in the main draw of a Masters 1000, in his career. In the second round, Wild faced world No. 15, Karen Khachanov, and delivered one of his career-best performances by defeating him also in straight sets. Since Thomaz Bellucci's performance in Rome in 2016, a Brazilian player had not recorded two consecutive match wins in the main draw of a Masters.

Wild also qualified into the main draw at the 2024 Miami Open following two qualifying wins, similar to his showing at the previous Masters in Indian Wells. He defeated Nuno Borges to record his first win at this tournament. In the second round, Wild faced 12th seed Taylor Fritz and won in straight sets, without a break on his serve to reach a second consecutive third round showing at a Masters level. In a 3-hour battle against No.23 seed Nicolás Jarry, where both served at a high level throughout the game, Wild came out ahead but was eliminated by 2 sets to 1.

Wild returned playing at the ATP 250 in Bucharest in April, defeating Luca Nardi in his debut. As a result, he reached the 63º position in the rankings.

Wild entered into the main draw of the Masters 1000 in Madrid, where he was drawn to face Roman Safiullin. Wild defeated the Russian number 42 in the world in straight sets, and in the 2nd round, he faced Lorenzo Musetti, seeded 28th and 29th in the rankings, and, repeating the 2018 US Open youth final, also won in straight sets, reaching the 3rd round where he played with the current two-time Madrid Masters 1000 champion and former world No. 1 Carlos Alcaraz, losing by double 6/3. With this, Wild reached the best ranking of his career, number 61 in the world, equaling Thiago Monteiro's best ranking and becoming the 14th best Brazilian male tennis player of all time.

At the Masters 1000 in Rome, Wild defeated Grégoire Barrère, but in the 2nd round he was eliminated by Argentine Tomás Martín Etcheverry, top 30 in the world. Due to the result, he reached his best career ranking, becoming 58th in the world.

In November 2024, Wild underwent surgery to remove three hernias in his abdomen and a cyst in his shoulder, ending his season.

== Style of play ==
Seyboth Wild's is a clay-court specialist, and he excels with his down-the-line forehand shot. His favorite tournament is the French Open. Growing up, he admired Rafael Nadal and strives to emulate Nadal's energy and intensity on the court.

== Personal life ==
Seyboth Wild currently resides in Buenos Aires, Argentina. He is an avid football fan, having supported Grêmio since his youth. His favourite player is defender and former team captain Pedro Geromel.

In September 2021, it was revealed that Seyboth Wild was being investigated by Brazilian Civil Police of Rio de Janeiro State for physical and emotional abuse towards ex-girlfriend Thayane Lima, for which he received a restraining order. Seyboth Wild has since denied the charges, and has launched a defamation and extortion attempt lawsuit. Two lawsuits investigating the allegations of domestic and psychological violence and moral damage were filed in April 2023, with the government indicting Wild. A third investigation is currently in progress and runs in secrecy of Justice.

== Performance timeline ==
Key
W	F	SF	QF	#R	RR	Q#	P#	DNQ	A	Z#	PO	G	S	B	NMS	NTI	P	NH

(W) winner; (F) finalist; (SF) semifinalist; (QF) quarterfinalist; (#R) rounds 4, 3, 2, 1; (RR) round-robin stage; (Q#) qualification round; (P#) preliminary round; (DNQ) did not qualify; (A) absent; (Z#) Davis/Fed Cup Zonal Group (with number indication) or (PO) play-off; (G) gold, (S) silver or (B) bronze Olympic/Paralympic medal; (NMS) not a Masters tournament; (NTI) not a Tier I tournament; (P) postponed; (NH) not held; (SR) strike rate (events won / competed); (W–L) win–loss record.
To avoid confusion and double counting, these charts are updated at the conclusion of a tournament or when the player's participation has ended.

=== Singles ===
Current through the 2026 Argentina Open.

Tournament	2018	2019	2020	2021	2022	2023	2024	2025	2026	SR	W–L	Win %
Grand Slam tournaments
Australian Open	A	A	Q1	Q1	1R	A	1R	1R	Q2	0 / 2	0–2	0%
French Open	A	A	Q1	Q1	Q1	3R	1R	Q2	Q2	0 / 2	2–2	50%
Wimbledon	A	A	NH	Q2	Q1	Q3	2R	Q1	A	0 / 1	1–1	50%
US Open	A	A	1R	A	A	Q2	1R	Q1	Q2	0 / 2	0–2	0%
Win–loss	0–0	0–0	0–1	0–0	0–0	2–1	1–4	0–1	0–0	0 / 7	3–7	30%
National representation
Davis Cup	A	A	QR	A	QR	WG1	A			0 / 1	1–2	33%
ATP 1000 tournaments
Indian Wells Open	A	A	NH	A	A	A	3R	2R	A	0 / 2	3–2	60%
Miami Open	A	A	NH	1R	Q1	A	3R	1R	A	0 / 3	2–3	40%
Monte-Carlo Masters	A	A	NH	A	A	A	A	A	A	0 / 0	0-0	–
Madrid Open	A	A	NH	A	A	A	3R	Q1	A	0 / 1	2-1	67%
Italian Open	A	A	A	A	A	A	2R	2R	A	0 / 2	2-2	50%
Canadian Open	A	A	NH	A	A	A	A	A	A	0 / 0	0-0	–
Cincinnati Open	A	A	A	A	A	A	A	A	A	0 / 0	0-0	–
Shanghai Masters	A	A	NH	NH	A	A	2R	A		0 / 1	1-1	50%
Paris Masters	A	A	A	A	A	Q1	A	A		0 / 0	0-0	–
Win–loss	0–0	0–0	0–0	0–1	0–0	0–0	8–5	2–3	0–0	0 / 9	10-9	53%
Career statistics
	2018	2019	2020	2021	2022	2023	2024	2025	2026	Career		
Tournaments	1	3	3	6	1	6	15	8	1	Career total: 44		
Titles	0	0	1	0	0	0	0	0	–	Career total: 1		
Finals	0	0	1	0	0	0	0	0	–	Career total: 1		
Overall win–loss	0–1	1–3	6–3	1–6	1–2	4–6	20–25	6–10	0–1	39–57		
Year-end ranking	449	211	116	131	417	73	74	217				

== ATP Tour finals ==
=== Singles: 1 (title) ===
Legend Grand Slam (–) ATP 1000 (–) ATP 500 (–) ATP 250 (1–0)	Finals by surface Hard (–) Clay (1–0) Grass (–)	Finals by setting Outdoor (1–0) Indoor (–)

Result	W–L	Date	Tournament	Tier	Surface	Opponent	Score
Win	1–0	Mar 2020	Chile Open, Chile	ATP 250	Clay	(Norway) Casper Ruud	7–5, 4–6, 6–3

=== Doubles: 1 (runner-up) ===
Legend Grand Slam (–) ATP 1000 (–) ATP 500 (–) ATP 250 (0–1)	Finals by surface Hard (–) Clay (0–1) Grass (–)	Finals by setting Outdoor (0–1) Indoor (–)

Result	W–L	Date	Tournament	Tier	Surface	Partner	Opponents	Score
Loss	0–1	Mar 2023	Chile Open, Chile	ATP 250	Clay	(Chile) Matías Soto	(Italy) Andrea Pellegrino (Italy) Andrea Vavassori	4–6, 6–3, [10–12]

== ATP Challenger Tour finals ==
=== Singles: 16 (9 titles, 7 runner-ups) ===
Legend ATP Challenger (9–7)	Finals by surface Hard (–) Clay (9–7)

Result	W–L	Date	Tournament	Surface	Opponent	Score
Win	1–0	Nov 2019	Challenger de Guayaquil, Ecuador	Clay	(Bolivia) Hugo Dellien	6–4, 6–0
Loss	1–1	Sep 2020	Open du Pays d'Aix, France	Clay	(Germany) Oscar Otte	2–6, 7–6^{(7–4)}, 4–6
Loss	1–2	Mar 2023	Challenger de Santiago, Chile	Clay	(Bolivia) Hugo Dellien	6–3, 3–6, 3–6
Win	2–2	Mar 2023	Viña Challenger, Chile	Clay	(France) Hugo Gaston	7–5, 6–1
Win	3–2	Apr 2023	Challenger AAT, Argentina	Clay	(Italy) Luciano Darderi	6–3, 6–3
Win	4–2	Sep 2023	Città di Como Challenger, Italy	Clay	(Spain) Pedro Martínez	5–7, 6–2, 6–3
Win	5–2	Sep 2023	AON Open, Italy	Clay	(Italy) Fabio Fognini	6–2, 7–6^{(7–3)}
Loss	5–3	Sep 2024	Bad Waltersdorf Trophy, Austria	Clay	(Spain) Jaume Munar	2–6, 1–6
Loss	5–4	Jun 2025	Modena Challenger, Italy	Clay	(Italy) Stefano Travaglia	4–6, 3–6
Loss	5–5	Jan 2026	Itajaí Open, Brazil	Clay	(Paraguay) Daniel Vallejo	5–7, 6–4, 2–6
Win	6–5	Jun 2026	Piracicaba Challenger, Brazil	Clay	(Argentina) Gonzalo Villanueva	6–2, 6–2
Win	7–5	Jul 2026	Zug Open, Switzerland	Clay	(Switzerland) Marc-Andrea Hüsler	6–4, 6–3
Win	8–5	Sep 2026	AON Open, Italy (2)	Clay	(Spain) Pedro Martínez	6–4, 6–2
Loss	8–6	Oct 2026	Antofagasta Challenger, Chile	Clay	(Brazil) João Lucas Reis da Silva	6–7^{(2–7)}, 6–1, 2–6
Win	9–6	Oct 2026	Santa Cruz Challenger, Bolivia	Clay	(Bolivia) Hugo Dellien	6–4, 6–3
Loss	9–7	Nov 2026	Costa do Sauípe Open, Brazil	Clay	(Argentina) Camilo Ugo Carabelli	2–6, 5–7

=== Doubles: 2 (1 title, 1 runner-up) ===
Legend ATP Challenger (1–1)

Result	W–L	Date	Tournament	Surface	Partner	Opponents	Score
Loss	0–1	Nov 2019	Challenger de Guayaquil, Ecuador	Clay	(Brazil) Pedro Sakamoto	(Uruguay) Ariel Behar (Ecuador) Gonzalo Escobar	6–7^{(4–7)}, 6–7^{(5–7)}
Win	1–1	Apr 2023	Challenger AAT, Argentina	Clay	(Argentina) Francisco Comesaña	(Argentina) Hernán Casanova (Argentina) Santiago Rodríguez Taverna	6–3, 6–7^{(5–7)}, [10–6]

== ITF Tour finals ==
=== Singles: 5 (3 titles, 2 runner-ups) ===
Legend ITF Futures/World Tennis (3–2)	Finals by surface Hard (–) Clay (3–2)

Result	W–L	Date	Tournament	Surface	Opponent	Score
Loss	0–1	Oct 2017	F39 Antalya, Turkey	Clay	(Spain) Jordi Samper Montaña	6–0, 4–6, 4–6
Win	1–1	Nov 2017	F42 Antalya, Turkey	Clay	(Italy) Riccardo Bonadio	6–4, 6–4
Win	2–1	Apr 2018	F1 São José do Rio Preto, Brazil	Clay	(Argentina) Camilo Ugo Carabelli	7–6^{(7–5)}, 6–3
Loss	2–2	May 2018	F4 Curitiba, Brazil	Clay	(Brazil) João Lucas Reis da Silva	7–6^{(7–1)}, 3–6, 2–6
Win	3–2	Jun 2019	M25 Montauban, France	Clay	(France) Hugo Gaston	6–4, 6–2

=== Doubles: 4 (3 titles, 1 runner-up) ===
Legend ITF Futures/World Tennis (3–1)	Finals by surface Hard (1–0) Clay (2–1)

Result	W–L	Date	Tournament	Surface	Partner	Opponents	Score
Win	1–0	Nov 2017	F42 Antalyav, Turkey	Clay	(Ecuador) Diego Hidalgo	(Japan) Takashi Saito (Turkey) Koray Kırcı	6–2, 6–3
Win	2–0	May 2018	F3 Brasília, Brazil	Clay	(Argentina) Tomás Martín Etcheverry	(Brazil) Oscar José Gutierrez (Brazil) Igor Marcondes	6–7^{(1–7)}, 7–6^{(7–3)}, [11–9]
Loss	2–1	Jun 2019	M25 Montauban, France	Clay	(France) Dan Added	(Colombia) Alejandro Gómez (United States) Junior Alexander Ore	2–6, 2–6
Win	3–1	Jul 2019	M25+H Ajaccio, France	Hard	(France) Yanais Laurent	(Germany) Fabian Fallert (Germany) Hendrik Jebens	6–4, 1–6, [10–8]

== Junior Grand Slam finals ==
=== Singles: 1 (title) ===
Result	Year	Tournament	Surface	Opponent	Score
Win	2018	US Open	Hard	(Italy) Lorenzo Musetti	6–1, 2–6, 6–2

== Wins over top 10 players ==
- Seyboth Wild has a 1–2 record against players who were, at the time the match was played, ranked in the top 10.

Season	2023	Total
Wins	1	1

#	Player	Rank	Event	Surface	Rd	Score	TSWR
2023
1.	Daniil Medvedev	2	French Open, France	Clay	1R	7–6^{(7–5)}, 6–7^{(6–8)}, 2–6, 6–3, 6–4	172

*As of 30 May 2023
