= Gabriel Debru =

French tennis player (born 2005)

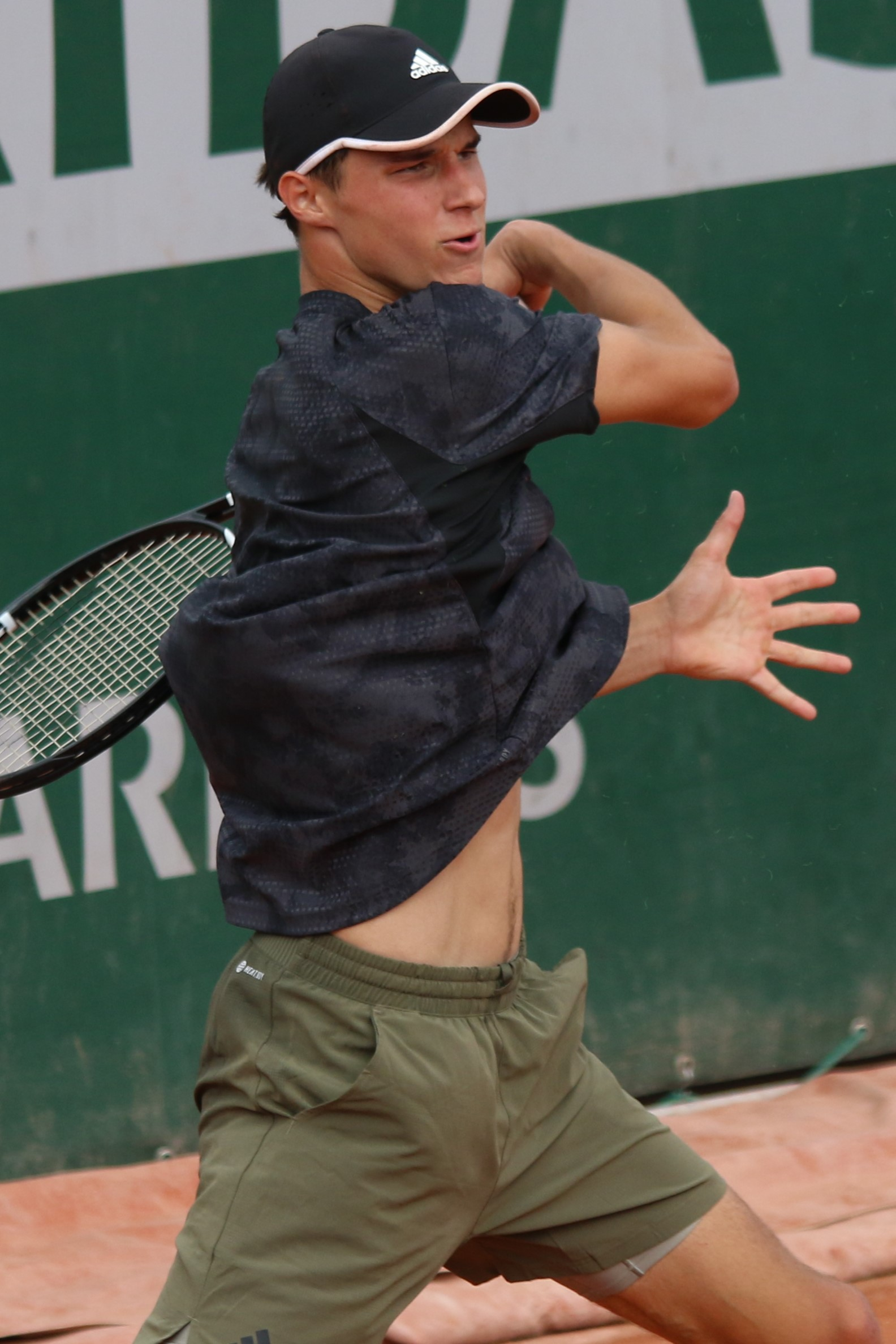
- Debru at the 2023 French Open
- Country (sports): France
- Born: 21 December 2005 (age 20) Grenoble, France
- Height: 1.93 m (6 ft 4 in)
- Plays: Right-handed (two handed-backhand)
- College: University of Illinois
- Coach: Boris Vallejo
- Prize money: US $216,425

Singles
- Career record: 0–0 (at ATP Tour level, Grand Slam level, and in Davis Cup)
- Career titles: 0; 3 Challenger
- Highest ranking: No. 233 (17 March 2025)
- Current ranking: No. 554 (9 November 2026)

Grand Slam singles results
- French Open: Q2 (2022)

Doubles
- Career record: 0–0 (at ATP Tour level, Grand Slam level, and in Davis Cup)
- Career titles: 0; 1 Challenger
- Highest ranking: No. 273 (4 November 2024)
- Current ranking: No. 611 (9 November 2026)
- Last updated on: 9 November 2026.

Gabriel Debru (born 21 December 2005) is a French tennis player. He has a career-high ATP singles ranking of No. 233 achieved on 17 March 2025 and a best doubles ranking of No. 273 reached on 4 November 2024.

== Junior career ==
Debru had remarkable results on ITF junior circuit, maintaining a 74–25 singles win-loss record. He won a major jr. title in singles, at the 2022 French Open. He was also a runner-up in boys' doubles, at 2022 Wimbledon. As a result, he reached an ITF junior combined ranking of world No. 1 on 11 July 2022.

== Professional career ==
=== 2022: Major qualifying debut ===
Debru made his debut at the 2022 French Open qualifying round, winning against compatriot Arthur Fils but then losing in the second round.

=== 2023: First ITF title and Challenger final ===
Debru reached his first Challenger quarterfinal in his first appearance of the year, at the Oeiras Indoors, Portugal. He reached another quarterfinal a month later at the Challenger La Manche in Cherbourg, defeating Kenny de Schepper before falling to British Jan Choinski. At his second French Open qualifying appearance he lost in the first round to Dominican Nick Hardt.

In June, at the Open Sopra Steria de Lyon, Debru made it to his first Challenger semifinal having defeated former Top 20 Benoit Paire, however he then lost to Alexander Ritschard. In July, Debru won his first ITF title in Gubbio, Italy by defeating Federico Arnaboldi in the final. He had reached the semifinals the year prior. In August, Debru reached his first final on the ATP Challenger Tour in Prague, as a qualifier, losing to Rudolf Molleker in the championship match.

=== 2024: Challenger titles, Top 250 debut ===
In July, Debru won his maiden Challenger title in Troyes, defeating third seed Timofey Skatov in the final. At 18 years and 6 months, he became the youngest French player to win a Challenger title since 2017. The only French players to win at a younger age were Richard Gasquet, Fabrice Santoro, Gael Monfils and Corentin Moutet. João Fonseca, Joel Schwärzler, Debru, Rei Sakamoto and Learner Tien became the youngest champions of 2024 at that level.

In August, Debru won his second Challenger singles title in Como, defeating Ignacio Buse in the final. He became the third-youngest Frenchman to win multiple Challenger trophies (since 1978), joining former Top 10 players Richard Gasquet and Gael Monfils. In October, Debru won his maiden Challenger doubles title in Saint-Brieuc, partnering with Geoffrey Blancaneaux.

=== 2025: College years ===
Debru announced he would join the University of Illinois in the 2025-26 school year where his brother Mathis already played.

=== 2026: Challenger title ===
In June, Debru announced he would be transferring to the University of Texas. In July, he won his first Challenger title since starting college at the Samsun Open, defeating compatriot Constantin Bittoun Kouzmine in the final.

== Grand Slam performance timeline ==
Key
W	F	SF	QF	#R	RR	Q#	P#	DNQ	A	Z#	PO	G	S	B	NMS	NTI	P	NH

(W) winner; (F) finalist; (SF) semifinalist; (QF) quarterfinalist; (#R) rounds 4, 3, 2, 1; (RR) round-robin stage; (Q#) qualification round; (P#) preliminary round; (DNQ) did not qualify; (A) absent; (Z#) Davis/Fed Cup Zonal Group (with number indication) or (PO) play-off; (G) gold, (S) silver or (B) bronze Olympic/Paralympic medal; (NMS) not a Masters tournament; (NTI) not a Tier I tournament; (P) postponed; (NH) not held; (SR) strike rate (events won / competed); (W–L) win–loss record.
To avoid confusion and double counting, these charts are updated at the conclusion of a tournament or when the player's participation has ended.

=== Singles ===
Tournament	2022	2023	2024	2025	2026	W–L
Grand Slam tournaments
Australian Open	A	A	A	A	A	0–0
French Open	Q2	Q1	Q1	A	A	0–0
Wimbledon	A	A	A	A	A	0–0
US Open	A	A	A	A		0–0
Win–loss	0-0	0–0	0–0	0–0	0–0	0–0

== ATP Challenger Tour finals ==
=== Singles: 4 (3 titles, 1 runner-up) ===
Legend ATP Challenger Tour (3–1)	Finals by surface Hard (1–0) Clay (2–1)

Result	W–L	Date	Tournament	Tier	Surface	Opponent	Score
Loss	0–1	Aug 2023	Prague Open, Czech Republic	Challenger	Clay	(Germany) Rudolf Molleker	2–6, 2–6
Win	1–1	Jul 2024	Internationaux de Troyes, France	Challenger	Clay	(Kazakhstan) Timofey Skatov	6–3, 6–7^{(1–7)}, 7–5
Win	2–1	Aug 2024	Città di Como Challenger, Italy	Challenger	Clay	(Peru) Ignacio Buse	6–1, 2–6, 6–3
Win	3–1	Jul 2026	Samsun Open, Turkey	Challenger	Hard	(France) Constantin Bittoun Kouzmine	3–6, 7–5, 6–4

=== Doubles: 2 (1 title, 1 runner-up) ===
Legend ATP Challenger Tour (1–1)

Result	W–L	Date	Tournament	Tier	Surface	Partner	Opponents	Score
Win	1–0	Oct 2024	Open Saint-Brieuc, France	Challenger	Hard (i)	(France) Geoffrey Blancaneaux	(Czech Republic) Matěj Vocel (Switzerland) Jakub Paul	3–3, def.
Loss	1–1	Jul 2026	Samsun Open, Turkey	Challenger	Hard	(France) Dan Added	(United States) Christopher Papa (China) Zheng Baoluo	4–6, 7–6^{(7–2)}, [11–13]

== ITF World Tennis Tour finals ==
=== Singles: 3 (3 titles) ===
Legend ITF WTT (3–0)

Result	W–L	Date	Tournament	Tier	Surface	Opponent	Score
Win	1–0	Jul 2023	M15 Gubbio, Italy	WTT	Clay	(Italy) Federico Arnaboldi	6–4, 3–6, 6–3
Win	2–0	Jul 2024	M25 Uriage-les-Bains, France	WTT	Clay	(France) Maxime Chazal	6–1, 6–3
Win	3–0	Nov 2024	M25 Heraklion, Greece	WTT	Hard	(Switzerland) Rémy Bertola	3–6, 6–4, 6–2

=== Doubles: 4 (2 titles, 2 runner-ups) ===
Legend ITF WTT (2–2)	Finals by surface Hard (1–0) Clay (1–2)

Result	W–L	Date	Tournament	Tier	Surface	Partner	Opponents	Score
Win	1–0	Feb 2023	M15 Grenoble, France	WTT	Hard (i)	(France) Paul Inchauspé	(France) Maxence Beaugé (France) Émilien Voisin	6–2, 6–3
Loss	1–1	May 2023	M15 Antalya, Turkey	WTT	Clay	(Lithuania) Edas Butvilas	(Argentina) Mateo del Pino (Argentina) Juan Manuel La Serna	2–6, 6–1, [9–11]
Win	2–1	May 2023	M15 Antalya, Turkey	WTT	Clay	(Argentina) Juan Manuel La Serna	(Argentina) Sean Hess (Argentina) Fermín Tenti	7–6^{(7–4)}, 6–3
Loss	2–2	Jul 2024	M25 Uriage-les-Bains, France	WTT	Clay	(France) Tiago Pires	(France) Florent Bax (France) Alexandre Aubriot	3–6, 6–2, [5–10]

== Junior Grand Slam finals ==
=== Singles: 1 (title) ===
Result	Year	Tournament	Surface	Opponent	Score
Win	2022	French Open	Clay	(Belgium) Gilles-Arnaud Bailly	7–6^{(7–5)}, 6–3

=== Doubles: 1 (runner-up) ===
Result	Year	Tournament	Surface	Partner	Opponents	Score
Loss	2022	Wimbledon	Grass	(France) Paul Inchauspé	(United States) Sebastian Gorzny (United States) Alex Michelsen	6–7^{(5–7)}, 3–6
