= Christopher Papa =

American tennis player (born 2001)

- Country (sports): United States
- Born: April 24, 2001 (age 25) Cypress, California, United States
- Height: 1.78 m (5 ft 10 in)
- Plays: Right-handed (two-handed backhand)
- College: Pepperdine
- Prize money: US $21,989

Singles
- Career record: 0–0 (at ATP Tour level, Grand Slam level, and in Davis Cup)
- Career titles: 0
- Highest ranking: No. 1,032 (July 13, 2026)
- Current ranking: No. 1,042 (September 28, 2026)

Doubles
- Career record: 0–0 (at ATP Tour level, Grand Slam level, and in Davis Cup)
- Career titles: 1 Challenger, 4 ITF
- Highest ranking: No. 241 (September 28, 2026)
- Current ranking: No. 241 (September 28, 2026)
- Last updated on: September 29, 2026.

Christopher Papa (born April 24, 2001) is an American tennis player. Papa has a career high ATP singles ranking of No. 1,032 achieved on July 13, 2026 and a career high ATP doubles ranking of No. 241 achieved on September 28, 2026.

Papa has won one ATP Challenger doubles title at the 2026 Samsun Open.

Papa played college tennis at Pepperdine.
