= 2017 Mençuna Cup =

- Date: 21–27 August
- Edition: 1st
- Category: ITF Women's Circuit
- Prize money: $60,000
- Surface: Hard
- Location: Artvin, Turkey

Champions

Singles
- (Russia) Valeria Savinykh

Doubles
- (Brazil) Gabriela Cé / (India) Ankita Raina
Mençuna Cup	· 2018 →

The 2017 Mençuna Cup was a professional tennis tournament played on outdoor hard courts. It was the first edition of the tournament and was part of the 2017 ITF Women's Circuit. It took place in Artvin, Turkey, on 21–27 August 2017.

== Singles main draw entrants ==
=== Seeds ===
Country	Player	Rank^{1}	Seed
GEO	Sofia Shapatava	243	1
CRO	Tereza Mrdeža	244	2
BUL	Elitsa Kostova	247	3
TUR	Ayla Aksu	259	4
RUS	Anastasia Potapova	264	5
IND	Ankita Raina	271	6
ITA	Cristiana Ferrando	274	7
NED	Bibiane Schoofs	288	8

- ^{1} Rankings as of 14 August 2017.

=== Other entrants ===
The following players received a wildcard into the singles main draw:

- (Turkey) Başak Akbaş
- (Turkey) Berfu Cengiz
- (Turkey) İpek Öz
- (Turkey) Melis Sezer

The following player received entry using a protected ranking:

- (Russia) Vitalia Diatchenko

The following players received entry from the qualifying draw:

- (Kazakhstan) Gozal Ainitdinova
- (Uzbekistan) Akgul Amanmuradova
- (Georgia (country)) Ekaterine Gorgodze
- (Russia) Ekaterina Kazionova

== Champions ==
=== Singles ===
- (Russia) Valeria Savinykh def. (Turkey) Ayla Aksu, 3–6, 7–6^{(12–10)}, 7–6^{(7–5)}

=== Doubles ===
- (Brazil) Gabriela Cé / (India) Ankita Raina def. (Bulgaria) Elitsa Kostova / (Russia) Yana Sizikova, 6–2, 6–3
