= 2009 Fed Cup Europe/Africa Zone Group I – play-offs =

International tennis competition play-offs

The play-offs of the 2009 Fed Cup Europe/Africa Zone Group I were the final stages of the Group I Zonal Competition involving teams from Europe and Africa. Using the positions determined in their pools, the sixteen teams faced off to determine their placing in the 2009 Fed Cup Europe/Africa Zone Group I. The top two teams advanced to World Group II play-offs, and the bottom two teams were relegated down to the Europe/Africa Zone Group II for the next year.

Placing	Pool A	Pool B	Pool C	Pool D
1	Great Britain	Poland	Belarus	Estonia
2	Hungary	Sweden	Denmark	Croatia
3	Netherlands	Romania	Slovenia	Bulgaria
4	Luxembourg	Bosnia and Herzegovina	Austria	

== Promotion play-offs ==
The first placed teams of each pool were placed against each other in two head-to-head rounds. The winner of the rounds advanced to the World Group II play-offs, where they would get a chance to advance to the World Group II for next year.

=== Great Britain vs. Poland ===
Great Britain
1
Coral Tennis Club, Tallinn, Estonia
7 February 2009
Greenset hard (indoors)

Poland
2

			1	2	3
1	(United Kingdom) (Poland)	Elena Baltacha; Katarzyna Piter	6; 4	6; 1
2	(United Kingdom) (Poland)	Anne Keothavong; Agnieszka Radwańska	6^{2} 7^{7}	6^{4} 7^{7}
3	(United Kingdom) (Poland)	Sarah Borwell / Anne Keothavong; Klaudia Jans / Alicja Rosolska	5; 7	3; 6

=== Belarus vs. Estonia ===
Belarus
0
Coral Tennis Club, Tallinn, Estonia
7 February 2009
Greenset hard (indoors)

Estonia
2

			1	2	3
1	(Belarus) (Estonia)	Olga Govortsova; Maret Ani	3; 6	4; 6
2	(Belarus) (Estonia)	Victoria Azarenka; Kaia Kanepi	6; 2	3; 6	1; 6
3	(Belarus) (Estonia)					not played

== Fifth to Seventh play-offs ==
The second placed teams of each pool were placed against each other in two ties. The winner of each tie was allocated fifth place in the Group while the losers were allocated seventh.

=== Hungary vs. Sweden ===
Hungary
1
Coral Tennis Club, Tallinn, Estonia
7 February 2009
Greenset hard (indoors)

Sweden
2

			1	2	3
1	(Hungary) (Sweden)	Zsófia Susányi; Johanna Larsson	1; 6	2; 6
2	(Hungary) (Sweden)	Katalin Marosi; Sofia Arvidsson	6; 1	7^{11} 6^{9}
3	(Hungary) (Sweden)	Gréta Arn / Katalin Marosi; Sofia Arvidsson / Johanna Larsson	3; 6	3; 6

=== Denmark vs. Croatia ===
Denmark
0
Coral Tennis Club, Tallinn, Estonia
7 February 2009
Greenset hard (indoors)

Croatia
2

			1	2	3
1	(Denmark) (Croatia)	Mai Grage; Petra Martić	5; 7	0; 6
2	(Denmark) (Croatia)	Hanne Skak Jensen; Sanda Mamić	6; 0	1; 6	3; 6
3	(Denmark) (Croatia)					not played

== Ninth ==
Due to the fact that there were an odd number of teams in Pool D (three), as opposed to the four teams in the other pools, all the teams that placed third in the pools with four teams (Netherlands, Romania and Slovenia) were allocated ninth place.

== Relegation play-offs ==
The last placed teams of each pool were placed against each other in two ties. The losing team of the rounds were relegated to Group II for next year.

=== Luxembourg vs. Austria ===
Luxembourg
1
Coral Tennis Club, Tallinn, Estonia
7 February 2009
Greenset hard (indoors)

Austria
2

			1	2	3
1	(Luxembourg) (Austria)	Claudine Schaul; Melanie Klaffner	6; 0	5; 7	6; 1
2	(Luxembourg) (Austria)	Mandy Minella; Patricia Mayr	7^{7} 6^{4}	2; 6	3; 6
3	(Luxembourg) (Austria)	Mandy Minella / Claudine Schaul; Sandra Klemenschits / Patricia Mayr	1; 6	1; 6

=== Bosnia and Herzegovina vs. Bulgaria ===
Bosnia and Herzegovina
2
Coral Tennis Club, Tallinn, Estonia
7 February 2009
Greenset hard (indoors)

Bulgaria
1

			1	2	3
1	(Bosnia and Herzegovina) (Bulgaria)	Sandra Martinović; Elitsa Kostova	6; 4	0; 6	6; 2
2	(Bosnia and Herzegovina) (Bulgaria)	Mervana Jugić-Salkić; Tsvetana Pironkova	1; 6	1; 6
3	(Bosnia and Herzegovina) (Bulgaria)	Mervana Jugić-Salkić / Sandra Martinović; Elitsa Kostova / Tsvetana Pironkova	6; 4	3; 6	6; 3

== Final Placements ==
Placing	Teams
Promoted	Poland
Promoted	Estonia
Third	Great Britain
Third	Belarus
Fifth	Sweden
Fifth	Croatia
Seventh	Hungary
Seventh	Denmark
Ninth	Netherlands
Ninth	Romania
Ninth	Slovenia
Twelfth	Austria
Twelfth	Bosnia and Herzegovina
Relegated	Luxembourg
Relegated	Bulgaria

- Poland and Estonia advanced to the World Group II play-offs. The Poles were drawn against Japan, and they won 3–2, which thus caused them to advance to 2009 World Group II. The Estonians were drawn against Israel, and they also won 3–2, and therefore also advanced to World Group II.
- Luxembourg and Bulgaria were relegated down to Europe/Africa Zone Group II for the next year.

== See also ==
- Fed Cup structure
