= 2009 Fed Cup Europe/Africa Zone Group I – Pool D =

Group D of the 2009 Fed Cup Europe/Africa Zone Group I was one of four pools in the Europe/Africa Zone Group I of the 2009 Fed Cup. Four teams competed in a round robin competition, with the top team and the bottom team proceeding to their respective sections of the play-offs: the top team played for advancement to the World Group II Play-offs, while the bottom team faced potential relegation to Group II.

		(Croatia) CRO	(Bulgaria) BUL	(Estonia) EST	RR; W–L	Set; W–L	Game; W–L	Standings
19	Croatia		2–1	1–2	1–1	7–7	66–64	2
34	Bulgaria	1–2		0–3	0–2	3–10	44–74	3
45	Estonia	2–1	3–0		2–0	11–4	82–54	1

== Bulgaria vs. Estonia ==
Bulgaria
0
Coral Tennis Club, Tallinn, Estonia
4 February 2009
Greenset hard (indoors)

Estonia
3

			1	2	3
1	(Bulgaria) (Estonia)	Elitsa Kostova; Maret Ani	2; 6	2; 6
2	(Bulgaria) (Estonia)	Tsvetana Pironkova; Kaia Kanepi	6^{6} 7^{8}	2; 6
3	(Bulgaria) (Estonia)	Elitsa Kostova / Tsvetana Pironkova; Maret Ani / Kaia Kanepi	1; 6	6; 4	2; 6

== Croatia vs. Estonia ==
Croatia
1
Coral Tennis Club, Tallinn, Estonia
5 February 2009
Greenset hard (indoors)

Estonia
2

			1	2	3
1	(Croatia) (Estonia)	Petra Martić; Maret Ani	3; 6	6; 2	4; 6
2	(Croatia) (Estonia)	Sanda Mamić; Kaia Kanepi	3; 6	0; 6
3	(Croatia) (Estonia)	Jelena Kostanić Tošić / Ana Vrljić; Margit Rüütel / Anett Schutting	6; 4	5; 7	6; 4

== Croatia vs. Bulgaria ==
Croatia
2
Coral Tennis Club, Tallinn, Estonia
6 February 2009
Greenset hard (indoors)

Bulgaria
1

			1	2	3
1	(Croatia) (Bulgaria)	Petra Martić; Elitsa Kostova	6; 2	6; 1
2	(Croatia) (Bulgaria)	Sanda Mamić; Tsvetana Pironkova	5; 7	3; 6
3	(Croatia) (Bulgaria)	Jelena Kostanić Tošić / Petra Martić; Elitsa Kostova / Tsvetana Pironkova	6; 4	5; 7	6; 4

== See also ==
- Fed Cup structure
