= 2017 Mençuna Cup – Doubles =

Doubles
- 2017 Mençuna Cup

Final
- Champion: (Brazil) Gabriela Cé (India) Ankita Raina
- Runner-up: (Bulgaria) Elitsa Kostova (Russia) Yana Sizikova
- Score: 6–2, 6–3

Events
Singles	Doubles
Mençuna Cup	· 2018 →

This was the first edition of the tournament.

Gabriela Cé and Ankita Raina won the title after defeating Elitsa Kostova and Yana Sizikova 6–2, 6–3 in the final.

== Seeds ==
1. (Georgia (country)) Oksana Kalashnikova / (Belgium) An-Sophie Mestach (quarterfinals)
2. (Russia) Natela Dzalamidze / (Russia) Valeria Savinykh (quarterfinals)
3. (India) Prarthana Thombare / (Montenegro) Ana Veselinović (semifinals)
4. (Bulgaria) Elitsa Kostova / (Russia) Yana Sizikova (final)

== Draw ==
=== Key ===
- Q = Qualifier
- WC = Wild card
- LL = Lucky loser
- Alt = Alternate
- SE = Special exempt
- PR = Protected ranking
- ITF = ITF entry
- JE = Junior exempt
- w/o = Walkover
- r = Retired
- d = Defaulted
- SR = Special ranking

First round
1	(Georgia (country)) O Kalashnikova (Belgium) A-S Mestach	6	7^{7}
WC	(Israel) V Ekshibarova (Turkey) M Sezer	4	6^{4}
WC	(Turkey) B Cengiz (India) KK Thandi	6	4	[10]
(Ukraine) V Kapshay (Germany) J Wachaczyk	3	6	[5]
4	(Bulgaria) E Kostova (Russia) Y Sizikova	6	6
(Russia) A Gabueva (Russia) E Yashina	2	4
(Georgia (country)) S Shapatava (Ukraine) A Vasylyeva	6	6
(Finland) E Laine (Japan) K Takahata	1	4
WC	(Turkey) P Özgen (Croatia) A Vrljić	3	3
(Uzbekistan) A Amanmuradova (Slovakia) M Hončová	6	6
(Russia) A Potapova (Ukraine) V Strakhova	4	6	[8]
3	(India) P Thombare (Montenegro) A Veselinović	6	4	[10]
(Bosnia and Herzegovina) D Herdželaš (Croatia) T Mrdeža	5	4
(Brazil) G Cé (India) A Raina	7	6
(Turkey) A Aksu (United Kingdom) H Dart	6^{11}	4
2	(Russia) N Dzalamidze (Russia) V Savinykh	7^{13}	6

Quarterfinals
1	(Georgia (country)) O Kalashnikova (Belgium) A-S Mestach	6^{5}	4
WC	(Turkey) B Cengiz (India) KK Thandi	7^{7}	6
4	(Bulgaria) E Kostova (Russia) Y Sizikova	7	6
(Georgia (country)) S Shapatava (Ukraine) A Vasylyeva	5	0
(Uzbekistan) A Amanmuradova (Slovakia) M Hončová	6	2	[8]
3	(India) P Thombare (Montenegro) A Veselinović	3	6	[10]
(Brazil) G Cé (India) A Raina	7	6
2	(Russia) N Dzalamidze (Russia) V Savinykh	5	3

Semifinals
WC	(Turkey) B Cengiz (India) KK Thandi	7^{7}	1	[7]
4	(Bulgaria) E Kostova (Russia) Y Sizikova	6^{5}	6	[10]
3	(India) P Thombare (Montenegro) A Veselinović	2	2
(Brazil) G Cé (India) A Raina	6	6

Final
4	(Bulgaria) E Kostova (Russia) Y Sizikova	2	3
(Brazil) G Cé (India) A Raina	6	6
