= 2017 Mençuna Cup – Singles =

Singles
- 2017 Mençuna Cup

Final
- Champion: (Russia) Valeria Savinykh
- Runner-up: (Turkey) Ayla Aksu
- Score: 3–6, 7–6^{(12–10)}, 7–6^{(7–5)}

Events
Singles	Doubles
Mençuna Cup	· 2018 →

This was the first edition of the tournament.

Valeria Savinykh won the title after defeating Ayla Aksu 3–6, 7–6^{(12–10)}, 7–6^{(7–5)} in the final.

== Seeds ==
1. (Georgia (country)) Sofia Shapatava (first round)
2. (Croatia) Tereza Mrdeža (quarterfinals)
3. (Bulgaria) Elitsa Kostova (second round)
4. (Turkey) Ayla Aksu (final)
5. (Russia) Anastasia Potapova (quarterfinals)
6. (India) Ankita Raina (quarterfinals)
7. (Italy) Cristiana Ferrando (quarterfinals)
8. (Netherlands) Bibiane Schoofs (second round)

== Draw ==
=== Key ===
- Q = Qualifier
- WC = Wild card
- LL = Lucky loser
- Alt = Alternate
- SE = Special exempt
- PR = Protected ranking
- ITF = ITF entry
- JE = Junior exempt
- w/o = Walkover
- r = Retired
- d = Defaulted
- SR = Special ranking

=== Finals ===
Semifinals
(Russia) Valeria Savinykh	5	7	6
PR	(Russia) Vitalia Diatchenko	7	5	4
4	(Turkey) Ayla Aksu	7	7^{7}
(Bosnia and Herzegovina) Dea Herdželaš	5	6^{4}

Final
(Russia) Valeria Savinykh	3	7^{12}	7^{7}
4	(Turkey) Ayla Aksu	6	6^{10}	6^{5}

=== Top half ===
First round
1	(Georgia (country)) S Shapatava	6^{3}	3
(Russia) V Savinykh	7^{7}	6
(Russia) N Dzalamidze	1	0
(Slovakia) M Hončová	6	6
(India) KK Thandi	7^{12}	3	5
(Ukraine) A Vasylyeva	6^{10}	6	7
Q	(Georgia (country)) E Gorgodze	6^{5}	6	6^{5}
7	(Italy) C Ferrando	7^{7}	3	7^{7}
3	(Bulgaria) E Kostova	4	6	6
(Ukraine) V Strakhova	6	3	0
PR	(Russia) V Diatchenko	6	7
WC	(Turkey) B Cengiz	3	5
Q	(Uzbekistan) A Amanmuradova	4	6	6
(Belgium) A-S Mestach	6	4	1
(Brazil) G Cé	1	1
5	(Russia) A Potapova	6	6

Second round
(Russia) V Savinykh	7^{7}	6
(Slovakia) M Hončová	6^{2}	1
(Ukraine) A Vasylyeva	6^{1}	6	4
7	(Italy) C Ferrando	7^{7}	2	6
3	(Bulgaria) E Kostova	3	3
PR	(Russia) V Diatchenko	6	6
Q	(Uzbekistan) A Amanmuradova	1	1
5	(Russia) A Potapova	6	6

Quarterfinals
(Russia) V Savinykh	7	6
7	(Italy) C Ferrando	5	4
PR	(Russia) V Diatchenko	2	6	7^{7}
5	(Russia) A Potapova	6	3	6^{4}

Semifinals
(Russia) V Savinykh	5	7	6
PR	(Russia) V Diatchenko	7	5	4

=== Bottom half ===
First round
6	(India) A Raina	6	6
WC	(Turkey) B Akbaş	2	1
(Croatia) A Vrljić	6	6
(Turkey) P Özgen	4	2
WC	(Turkey) İ Öz	3	4
(Germany) J Wachaczyk	6	6
(United Kingdom) H Dart	4	4
4	(Turkey) A Aksu	6	6
8	(Netherlands) B Schoofs	6	6
(Montenegro) A Veselinović	2	4
(United Kingdom) T Moore	7	2	4
(Bosnia and Herzegovina) D Herdželaš	5	6	6
Q	(Russia) E Kazionova	6	2	6
Q	(Kazakhstan) G Ainitdinova	0	6	4
WC	(Turkey) M Sezer	2	4
2	(Croatia) T Mrdeža	6	6

Second round
6	(India) A Raina	6	4	6
(Croatia) A Vrljić	1	6	4
(Germany) J Wachaczyk	6^{3}	3
4	(Turkey) A Aksu	7^{7}	6
8	(Netherlands) B Schoofs	3	6	5
(Bosnia and Herzegovina) D Herdželaš	6	3	7
Q	(Russia) E Kazionova	2	2
2	(Croatia) T Mrdeža	6	6

Quarterfinals
6	(India) A Raina	6	4	1
4	(Turkey) A Aksu	3	6	6
(Bosnia and Herzegovina) D Herdželaš	3	6	6
2	(Croatia) T Mrdeža	6	4	4

Semifinals
4	(Turkey) A Aksu	7	7^{7}
(Bosnia and Herzegovina) D Herdželaš	5	6^{4}
