= 2009 Fed Cup Europe/Africa Zone Group I – Pool A =

International tennis competition

Group A of the 2009 Fed Cup Europe/Africa Zone Group I was one of four pools in the Europe/Africa Zone Group I of the 2009 Fed Cup. Four teams competed in a round robin competition, with the top team and the bottom team proceeding to their respective sections of the play-offs: the top team played for advancement to the World Group II Play-offs, while the bottom team faced potential relegation to Group II.

		(Netherlands) NED	(Hungary) HUN	(Luxembourg) LUX	(United Kingdom) GBR	RR; W–L	Set; W–L	Game; W–L	Standings
26	Netherlands		1–2	3–0	0–3	1–2	8–11	65–113	3
30	Hungary	2–1		2–1	0–3	2–1	8–10	83–74	2
39	Luxembourg	0–3	1–2		0–3	0–3	3–14	64–79	4
42	Great Britain	3–0	3–0	3–0		3–0	16–0	97–43	1

== Hungary vs. Great Britain ==
Hungary
0
Coral Tennis Club, Tallinn, Estonia
4 February 2009
Greenset hard (indoors)

Great Britain
3

			1	2	3
1	(Hungary) (United Kingdom)	Gréta Arn; Elena Baltacha	5; 7	3; 6
2	(Hungary) (United Kingdom)	Ágnes Szávay; Anne Keothavong	3; 6	2; 6
3	(Hungary) (United Kingdom)	Katalin Marosi / Ágnes Szávay; Sarah Borwell / Melanie South	4; 6	3; 6

== Netherlands vs. Luxembourg ==
Netherlands
3
Coral Tennis Club, Tallinn, Estonia
4 February 2009
Greenset hard (indoors)

Luxembourg
0

			1	2	3
1	(Netherlands) (Luxembourg)	Michelle Gerards; Claudine Schaul	6; 2	6; 2
2	(Netherlands) (Luxembourg)	Arantxa Rus; Mandy Minella	7; 5	6^{6} 7^{8}	6; 2
3	(Netherlands) (Luxembourg)	Nicole Thijssen / Pauline Wong; Claudine Schaul / Fabienne Thill	7^{7} 6^{2}	6; 1

== Hungary vs. Luxembourg ==
Hungary
2
Coral Tennis Club, Tallinn, Estonia
5 February 2009
Greenset hard (indoors)

Luxembourg
1

			1	2	3
1	(Hungary) (Luxembourg)	Gréta Arn; Claudine Schaul	4; 6	1; 6
2	(Hungary) (Luxembourg)	Ágnes Szávay; Mandy Minella	6; 0	6; 1
3	(Hungary) (Luxembourg)	Katalin Marosi / Ágnes Szávay; Mandy Minella / Claudine Schaul	6; 3	6; 0

== Netherlands vs. Great Britain ==
Netherlands
0
Coral Tennis Club, Tallinn, Estonia
5 February 2009
Greenset hard (indoors)

Great Britain
3

			1	2	3
1	(Netherlands) (United Kingdom)	Michelle Gerards; Elena Baltacha	2; 6	4; 6
2	(Netherlands) (United Kingdom)	Arantxa Rus; Anne Keothavong	4; 6	4; 6
3	(Netherlands) (United Kingdom)	Nicole Thijssen / Pauline Wong; Sarah Borwell / Anne Keothavong	4; 6	0; 6

== Netherlands vs. Hungary ==
Netherlands
1
Coral Tennis Club, Tallinn, Estonia
6 February 2009
Greenset hard (indoors)

Hungary
2

			1	2	3
1	(Netherlands) (Hungary)	Nicole Thijssen; Katalin Marosi	6; 3	7^{7} 6^{3}
2	(Netherlands) (Hungary)	Pauline Wong; Ágnes Szávay	0; 6	5; 7
3	(Netherlands) (Hungary)	Nicole Thijssen / Pauline Wong; Katalin Marosi / Ágnes Szávay	1; 6	2; 6

== Luxembourg vs. Great Britain ==
Luxembourg
0
Coral Tennis Club, Tallinn, Estonia
6 February 2009
Greenset hard (indoors)

Great Britain
3

			1	2	3
1	(Luxembourg) (United Kingdom)	Fabienne Thill; Melanie South	0; 6	2; 6
2	(Luxembourg) (United Kingdom)	Mandy Minella; Anne Keothavong	1; 6	2; 6
3	(Luxembourg) (United Kingdom)	Mandy Minella / Fabienne Thill; Sarah Borwell / Melanie South				w/o

== See also ==
- Fed Cup structure
