= Mençuna Cup =

- 2017 Mençuna Cup

ITF Women's Tour
- Event name: Artvin
- Location: Artvin, Turkey
- Venue: Arhavi Tenis Kulübü
- Category: ITF Women's Circuit
- Surface: Hard
- Draw: 32S/32Q/16D
- Prize money: $60,000

The Mençuna Cup is a tournament for professional female tennis players played on outdoor hard courts. The event is classified as a $60,000 ITF Women's Circuit tournament and has been held in Artvin, Turkey, since 2017.

== Past finals ==
=== Singles ===
| Year | Champion | Runners-up | Score |
|---|---|---|---|
| 2017 | (Russia) Valeria Savinykh | (Turkey) Ayla Aksu | 3–6, 7–6^{(12–10)}, 7–6^{(7–5)} |

=== Doubles ===
| Year | Champions | Runners-up | Score |
|---|---|---|---|
| 2017 | (Brazil) Gabriela Cé (India) Ankita Raina | (Bulgaria) Elitsa Kostova (Russia) Yana Sizikova | 6–2, 6–3 |
