= Yana Sizikova =

Russian tennis player (born 1994)

Yana Sizikova Яна Сизикова
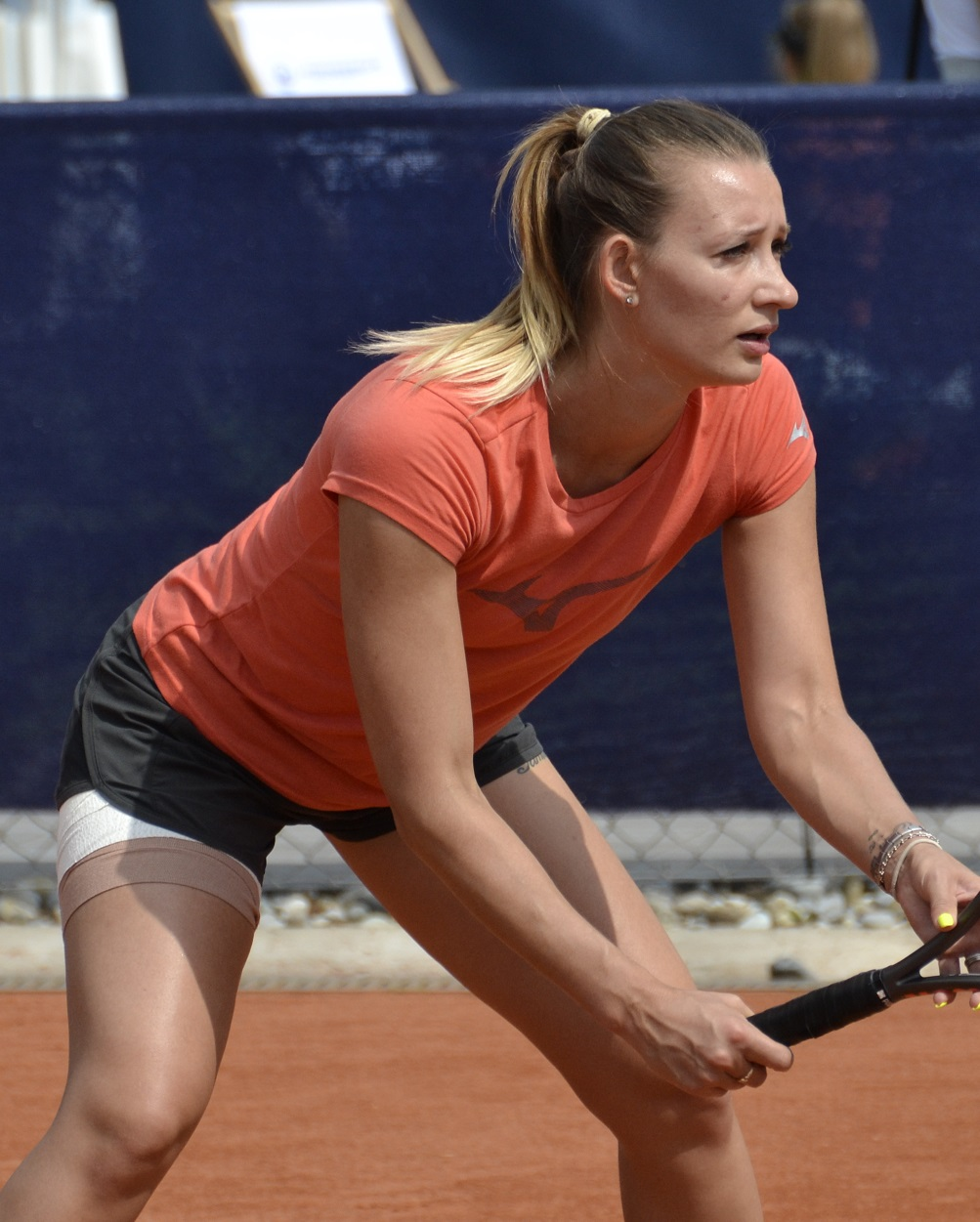
- Yana Sizikova at Nuremberg, 2019
- Full name: Yana Dmitriyevna Sizikova
- Country (sports): Russia
- Born: 12 November 1994 (age 31) Moscow, Russia
- Height: 1.73 m (5 ft 8 in)
- Plays: Right (two-handed backhand)
- Prize money: $593,223

Singles
- Career record: 237–183
- Career titles: 0 WTA, 3 ITF
- Highest ranking: No. 336 (20 June 2016)

Doubles
- Career record: 438–260
- Career titles: 6 WTA, 2 WTA Challengers
- Highest ranking: No. 40 (24 July 2023)

Grand Slam doubles results
- Australian Open: 2R (2023)
- French Open: 2R (2024)
- Wimbledon: 2R (2023, 2024)
- US Open: 1R (2022, 2023, 2024)

Grand Slam mixed doubles results
- Australian Open: 2R (2024)
- Wimbledon: 1R (2023)
Medal record
Women's tennis
Representing Russia
Summer Universiade
Gold medal – first place	2019 Naples	Mixed doubles
Bronze medal – third place	2019 Naples	Team classification

Yana Dmitriyevna Sizikova (Russian: Яна Дмитриевна Сизикова, IPA: [ˈjanə ˈsʲizʲɪkəvə]; born 12 November 1994) is a Russian inactive tennis player who specializes in doubles. She has a career-high doubles ranking by the WTA of 40, achieved on 24 July 2023. She peaked at No. 336 in singles on 20 June 2016.

Sizikova won six doubles titles on the WTA Tour and two on the WTA Challenger Tour.

== Career ==
=== 2018: WTA debut ===
Sizikova made her WTA Tour main-draw debut at the 2018 St. Petersburg Trophy in the doubles tournament, partnering Dayana Yastremska.

=== 2019: First WTA doubles title ===
Playing with Anastasia Potapova, Sizikova won her first WTA Tour title at the Ladies Open Lausanne, defeating Monique Adamczak and Han Xinyun in the final.

=== 2021: Match-fixing investigation ===
In June 2021, she was arrested at Roland Garros after her French Open doubles first-round loss, amid a match fixing in tennis investigation from previous year's tournament. The prosecutor's office said her arrest was for "sports bribery and organized fraud for acts likely to have been committed in September 2020." The case was opened by a French police unit specializing in betting fraud and match-fixing, and centered on suspicions about one match at Roland Garros. She has not been officially cleared and the matter remains unresolved.

=== 2022: Prague Open doubles win ===
Partnering with Han Xinyun, she was runner-up in the doubles at the 2022 Monterrey Open, losing the final to Catherine Harrison and Sabrina Santamaria. At the Prague Open, Sizikova and Anastasia Potapova claimed the doubles title, winning the final against Angelina Gabueva and Anastasia Zakharova in straight sets. Alongside Kamilla Rakhimova, she was runner-up in the doubles at the Transylvania Open, losing the final to Kirsten Flipkens and Laura Siegemund.

=== 2023: Three doubles titles ===
Sizikova won the doubles at the Morocco Open with Sabrina Santamaria, defeating Lidziya Marozava and Ingrid Gamarra Martins in the final. Partnering with Kimberley Zimmermann, Sizikova won the doubles at the Palermo Ladies Open, overcoming Angelica Moratelli and Camilla Rosatello in the final. She took the doubles title at the Open de Limoges, playing with Cristina Bucșa and defeating Oksana Kalashnikova and Maia Lumsden in the final.

=== 2024: Double doubles defenses ===
Alongside Irina Khromacheva she defended her doubles title at the Morocco Open, with a win over Anna Danilina and Xu Yifan in the final. Teaming up with Alexandra Panova, she also won the doubles title at Palermo Ladies Open for the second year in a row, defeating Yvonne Cavallé Reimers and Aurora Zantedeschi in the final which went to a deciding champions tiebreak.

== WTA Tour finals ==
=== Doubles: 9 (6 titles, 3 runner-ups) ===
Legend WTA 500 WTA 250 (6–3)	Finals by surface Hard (1–2) Clay (5–1)

Result	W–L	Date	Tournament	Tier	Surface	Partner	Opponents	Score
Win	1–0	Jul 2019	Ladies Open Lausanne, Switzerland	International	Clay	(Russia) Anastasia Potapova	(Australia) Monique Adamczak (China) Han Xinyun	6–2, 6–4
Loss	1–1	Mar 2022	Monterrey Open, Mexico	WTA 250	Hard	(China) Han Xinyun	(United States) Catherine Harrison (United States) Sabrina Santamaria	6–1, 5–7, [6–10]
Win	2–1	Jul 2022	Prague Open, Czech Republic	WTA 250	Hard	Anastasia Potapova	Angelina Gabueva; Anastasia Zakharova	6–3, 6–4
Loss	2–2	Oct 2022	Transylvania Open, Romania	WTA 250	Hard (i)	Kamilla Rakhimova	(Belgium) Kirsten Flipkens (Germany) Laura Siegemund	3–6, 5–7
Win	3–2	May 2023	Rabat Grand Prix, Morocco	WTA 250	Clay	(United States) Sabrina Santamaria	(Brazil) Ingrid Martins; Lidziya Marozava	3–6, 6–1, [10–8]
Win	4–2	Jul 2023	Palermo Ladies Open, Italy	WTA 250	Clay	(Belgium) Kimberley Zimmermann	(Italy) Angelica Moratelli (Italy) Camilla Rosatello	6–2, 6–4
Win	5–2	May 2024	Rabat Grand Prix, Morocco (2)	WTA 250	Clay	Irina Khromacheva	(Kazakhstan) Anna Danilina (China) Xu Yifan	6–3, 6–2
Win	6–2	Jul 2024	Palermo Ladies Open, Italy (2)	WTA 250	Clay	Alexandra Panova	(Spain) Yvonne Cavallé Reimers (Italy) Aurora Zantedeschi	4–6, 6–3, [10–5]
Loss	6–3	Jul 2024	Iași Open, Romania	WTA 250	Clay	Alexandra Panova	(Kazakhstan) Anna Danilina; Irina Khromacheva	4–6, 2–6

== WTA 125 finals ==
=== Doubles: 3 (2 titles, 1 runner-up) ===
Result	W–L	Date	Tournament	Surface	Partner	Opponents	Score
Loss	0–1	May 2022	Karlsruhe Open, Germany	Clay	(Belgium) Alison Van Uytvanck	(Egypt) Mayar Sherif (Hungary) Panna Udvardy	7–5, 4–6, [2–10]
Win	1–1	Nov 2022	Copa Santiago, Chile	Clay	(Indonesia) Aldila Sutjiadi	(Egypt) Mayar Sherif (Slovenia) Tamara Zidanšek	6–1, 3–6, [10–7]
Win	2–1	Dec 2023	Open de Limoges, France	Hard (i)	(Spain) Cristina Bucșa	(Georgia (country)) Oksana Kalashnikova (United Kingdom) Maia Lumsden	6–4, 6–1

== ITF Circuit finals ==
=== Singles: 15 (3 titles, 12 runner-ups) ===
Legend $25,000 tournaments (0–1) $10/15,000 tournaments (3–11)	Finals by surface Hard (3–10) Clay (0–2)

Result	W–L	Date	Tournament	Tier	Surface	Opponent	Score
Win	1–0	Dec 2012	ITF Djibouti City	10,000	Hard	(Italy) Anna Floris	6–2, 4–6, 6–4
Loss	1–1	Apr 2013	ITF Sharm El Sheikh, Egypt	10,000	Hard	(Spain) Arabela Fernandez Rabener	6–3, 4–6, 6–7^{(3)}
Loss	1–2	Sep 2013	ITF Sharm El Sheikh	10,000	Hard	(Oman) Fatma Al-Nabhani	5–7, 3–6
Win	2–2	Sep 2013	ITF Sharm El Sheikh	10,000	Hard	(India) Prarthana Thombare	7–6^{(7)}, 3–6, 7–5
Win	3–2	Oct 2013	ITF Sharm El Sheikh	10,000	Hard	(Ukraine) Helen Ploskina	6–2, 6–2
Loss	3–3	Jun 2015	ITF Sharm El Sheikh	10,000	Hard	(Russia) Angelina Zhuravleva	6–4, 6–7^{(3)}, 6–7^{(5)}
Loss	3–4	Aug 2015	ITF Port El Kantaoui, Tunisia	10,000	Hard	(Russia) Margarita Lazareva	6–3, 2–6, 2–6
Loss	3–5	Sep 2015	ITF Sharm El Sheikh, Egypt	10,000	Hard	(China) Yuanyi Yu	3–6, 1–6
Loss	3–6	Sep 2015	ITF Port El Kantaoui, Tunisia	10,000	Hard	(France) Caroline Romeo	3–6, 6–1, 0–6
Loss	3–7	Nov 2015	ITF Port El Kantaoui	10,000	Hard	(Liechtenstein) Kathinka von Deichmann	3–6, 6–1, 0–6
Loss	3–8	Dec 2015	ITF Port El Kantaoui	10,000	Hard	(Bulgaria) Isabella Shinikova	3–6, 2–6
Loss	3–9	Feb 2016	ITF Moscow, Russia	25,000	Hard (i)	(Russia) Irina Khromacheva	7–6^{(7)}, 4–6, 3–6
Loss	3–10	May 2016	Khimki Ladies Cup, Russia	10,000	Hard (i)	(Russia) Anastasia Gasanova	6–3, 2–6, 3–6
Loss	3–11	Feb 2017	ITF Hammamet, Tunisia	15,000	Clay	(Bosnia and Herzegovina) Jelena Simić	7–6^{(5)}, 4–6, 6–7^{(2)}
Loss	3–12	Aug 2017	ITF Moscow, Russia	15,000	Clay	(Belarus) Iryna Shymanovich	1–6, 7–5, 5–7

=== Doubles: 77 (44 titles, 33 runner-ups) ===
Legend $100,000 tournaments (0–1) $60,000 tournaments (0–2) $25,000 tournaments (14–8) $10/15,000 tournaments (30–22)	Finals by surface Hard (26–20) Clay (15–10) Carpet (3–3)

Result	W–L	Date	Tournament	Tier	Surface	Partner	Opponents	Score
Loss	0–1	Oct 2010	ITF Sant Cugat, Spain	10,000	Clay	(Germany) Desiree Schelenz	(Spain) Yvonne Cavallé Reimers (Spain) Carmen Lopez-Rueda	3–6, 5–7
Loss	0–2	Mar 2012	ITF Dijon, France	10,000	Hard (i)	(Belgium) Alison Van Uytvanck	(Latvia) Diāna Marcinkēviča (Greece) Despina Papamichail	5–7, 6–7^{(7)}
Loss	0–3	Apr 2012	ITF Manama, Bahrain	10,000	Hard	(Germany) Anna Zaja	(Australia) Abbie Myers (Russia) Anna Tyulpa	3–6, 6–3, [11–13]
Win	1–3	Apr 2012	ITF Fujairah, U.A.E.	10,000	Hard	(Germany) Anna Zaja	(Oman) Fatma Al-Nabhani (India) Kyra Shroff	6–4, 6–1
Win	2–3	Apr 2012	ITF Muscat, Oman	10,000	Hard	(India) Kyra Shroff	(Austria) Barbara Haas (France) Laëtitia Sarrazin	6–2, 6–4
Loss	2–4	May 2012	ITF Izmir, Turkey	10,000	Hard	(Mexico) Nadia Abdala	(Poland) Sylwia Zagórska (Poland) Natalia Siedliska	4–6, 3–6
Loss	2–5	Jun 2012	ITF Ağrı, Turkey	10,000	Carpet	(Australia) Abbie Myers	(Russia) Alexandra Romanova (Slovakia) Chantal Škamlová	3–6, 6–4, [7–10]
Loss	2–6	Jul 2012	ITF Izmir, Turkey	10,000	Hard	(Slovakia) Zuzana Zlochová	(Japan) Akari Inoue (Japan) Kaori Onishi	2–6, 6–1, [4–10]
Win	3–6	Sep 2012	ITF Astana, Kazakhstan	10,000	Hard	(Russia) Polina Monova	(Russia) Ulyana Ayzatulina (Russia) Elena Maltseva	6–3, 6–2
Loss	3–7	Nov 2012	ITF Heraklion, Greece	10,000	Carpet	(Serbia) Tamara Čurović	(Turkey) Başak Eraydın (Australia) Abbie Myers	4–6, 4–6
Win	4–7	Nov 2012	ITF La Vall d'Uixó, Spain	10,000	Clay	(United Kingdom) Jade Windley	(Austria) Katharina Negrin (Russia) Ksenija Sharifova	6–3, 6–4
Win	5–7	Dec 2012	ITF Djibouti City, Djibouti	10,000	Hard	(Ukraine) Diana Bogoliy	(France) Amandine Hesse (France) Chloé Paquet	6–3, 3–6, [10–8]
Win	6–7	Dec 2012	ITF Djibouti City	10,000	Hard	(Ukraine) Diana Bogoliy	(France) Amandine Hesse (France) Chloé Paquet	5–7, 6–4, [10–4]
Loss	6–8	Feb 2013	ITF Mallorca, Spain	10,000	Clay	(Italy) Anastasia Grymalska	(Spain) Leticia Costas (Hungary) Réka Luca Jani	3–6, 2–6
Win	7–8	Mar 2013	ITF Madrid, Spain	10,000	Clay	(Russia) Eugeniya Pashkova	(Italy) Gaia Sanesi (Italy) Giulia Sussarello	3–6, 6–3, [10–5]
Win	8–8	Apr 2013	ITF Sharm El Sheikh, Egypt	10,000	Hard	(Russia) Anna Morgina	(Belgium) Lise Brulmans (Belgium) Klaartje Liebens	6–3, 6–2
Loss	8–9	May 2013	ITF Monzón, Spain	10,000	Hard	(Spain) Arabela Fernandez Rabener	(Argentina) Tatiana Búa (Spain) Lucia Cervera-Vazquez	6–4, 5–7, [7–10]
Win	9–9	Aug 2013	ITF Sharm El Sheikh	10,000	Hard	(Russia) Anna Morgina	(Czech Republic) Nikola Horáková (Russia) Julia Valetova	6–2, 6–4
Win	10–9	Sep 2013	ITF Sharm El Sheikh	10,000	Hard	(Russia) Anna Morgina	(Oman) Fatma Al-Nabhani (Russia) Alina Mikheeva	6–7^{(5)}, 6–1, [10–8]
Win	11–9	Sep 2013	ITF Sharm El Sheikh	10,000	Hard	(Russia) Anna Morgina	(Italy) Giulia Bruzzone (Brazil) Karina Venditti	6–2, 6–3
Win	12–9	Oct 2013	ITF Sharm El Sheikh	10,000	Hard	(Russia) Anna Morgina	(India) Natasha Palha (Brazil) Karina Venditti	6–3, 6–2
Win	13–9	Dec 2013	ITF Djibouti City	10,000	Hard	(Chinese Taipei) Lee Hua-chen	(India) Shweta Rana (China) Wang Xiyao	6–3, 6–3
Win	14–9	Dec 2013	ITF Djibouti City	10,000	Hard	(Chinese Taipei) Lee Hua-chen	(Russia) Margalita Lazareva (Ukraine) Kateryna Sliusar	4–6, 6–3, [10–4]
Win	15–9	Mar 2014	ITF Lima, Peru	10,000	Clay	(Serbia) Tamara Čurović	(Argentina) Sofía Luini (Argentina) Aranza Salut	6–4, 7–5
Win	16–9	Mar 2014	ITF Lima, Peru	10,000	Clay	(Serbia) Tamara Čurović	(Argentina) Sofía Luini (Argentina) Aranza Salut	6–2, 7–6^{(2)}
Win	17–9	Apr 2014	ITF Lima, Peru	10,000	Clay	(Serbia) Tamara Čurović	(Argentina) Stephanie Petit (Argentina) Carolina Zeballos	6–0, 6–4
Loss	17–10	Apr 2014	ITF Andijan, Uzbekistan	10,000	Hard	(Russia) Polina Monova	(Uzbekistan) Albina Khabibulina (Russia) Veronika Kudermetova	4–6, 6–7^{(5)}
Win	18–10	Sep 2014	ITF Sharm El Sheikh	10,000	Hard	(Russia) Anna Morgina	(South Africa) Ilze Hattingh (South Africa) Michelle Sammons	6–3, 0–6, [10–6]
Loss	18–11	Sep 2014	ITF Sharm El Sheikh	10,000	Hard	(Russia) Anna Morgina	(India) Arantxa Andrady (South Africa) Ilze Hattingh	6–7^{(6)}, 2–6
Win	19–11	Jun 2015	ITF Kazan, Russia	10,000	Hard	(Russia) Anastasia Frolova	(Russia) Aida Kalimullina (Russia) Ekaterina Yashina	6–2, 6–3
Win	20–11	Aug 2015	ITF Plovdiv, Bulgaria	10,000	Clay	(Australia) Alexandra Nancarrow	(Ukraine) Maryna Kolb (Ukraine) Nadiya Kolb	6–3, 6–3
Loss	20–12	Aug 2015	ITF Tunis, Tunisia	10,000	Clay	(Serbia) Barbara Bonic	(France) Eléonore Barrère (France) Kassandra Davesne	1–6, 3–6
Loss	20–13	Aug 2015	ITF Port El Kantaoui, Tunisia	10,000	Hard	(Belarus) Darya Chernetsova	(Argentina) Sofía Luini (Hungary) Naomi Totka	5–7, 6–1, [7–10]
Loss	20–14	Sep 2015	ITF Sharm El Sheikh	10,000	Hard	(Thailand) Kamonwan Buayam	(Belgium) Britt Geukens (France) Victoria Muntean	1–6, 6–3, [8–10]
Win	21–14	Sep 2015	ITF Port El Kantaoui	10,000	Hard	(Russia) Olga Doroshina	(Germany) Lisa-Marie Maetschke (Belarus) Anastasiya Shleptsova	6–2, 6–2
Loss	21–15	Sep 2015	ITF Port El Kantaoui	10,000	Hard	(Sweden) Anette Munozova	(Greece) Valentini Grammatikopoulou (Bosnia and Herzegovina) Jelena Simic	6–4, 4–6, [6–10]
Win	22–15	Oct 2015	ITF Port El Kantaoui	10,000	Hard	(Belgium) Magali Kempen	(Poland) Patrycja Polanska (Czech Republic) Anna Slovaková	7–6^{(0)}, 6–4
Win	23–15	Nov 2015	ITF Port El Kantaoui	10,000	Hard	(Sweden) Linnea Malmqvist	(Sweden) Kajsa Rinaldo Person (Slovenia) Natalija Sipek	6–4, 6–2
Loss	23–16	Dec 2015	ITF Port El Kantaoui	10,000	Hard	(Belarus) Darya Chernetsova	(Switzerland) Karin Kennel (Bulgaria) Isabella Shinikova	6–4, 3–6, [7–10]
Win	24–16	Jan 2016	ITF Astana, Kazakhstan	10,000	Hard (i)	(Russia) Olga Doroshina	(Kazakhstan) Alexandra Grinchishina (Netherlands) Erika Vogelsang	6–4, 6–0
Loss	24–17	Feb 2016	ITF Moscow, Russia	25,000	Hard (i)	(Russia) Polina Monova	(Russia) Anastasiya Komardina (Serbia) Nina Stojanović	7–6^{(5)}, 1–6, [10–12]
Win	25–17	Mar 2016	ITF Sharm El Sheikh, Egypt	10,000	Hard	(Russia) Anastasiya Komardina	(Ukraine) Veronika Kapshay (Switzerland) Karin Kennel	3–6, 6–3, [10–6]
Loss	25–18	May 2016	ITF Khimki, Russia	10,000	Hard (i)	(Russia) Polina Monova	(Russia) Olga Doroshina (Russia) Alena Tarasova	2–6, 4–6
Win	26–18	Jun 2016	Fergana Challenger, Uzbekistan	25,000	Hard	(Russia) Polina Monova	(India) Prerna Bhambri (India) Ankita Raina	7–6^{(0)}, 6–2
Win	27–18	Jul 2016	ITF Kazan, Russia	10,000	Clay	(Russia) Olga Doroshina	(Russia) Amina Anshba (Russia) Angelina Gabueva	6–4, 6–7^{(8)}, [10–5]
Loss	27–19	Jul 2016	ITF Don Benito, Spain	10,000	Carpet	(Spain) Arabela Fernandez Rabener	(Netherlands) Chayenne Ewijk (Netherlands) Rosalie van der Hoek	5–7, 2–6
Loss	27–20	Jul 2016	ITF Astana, Kazakhstan	25,000	Hard	(Russia) Polina Monova	(Russia) Natela Dzalamidze (Russia) Veronika Kudermetova	2–6, 3–6
Win	28–20	Aug 2016	ITF Nonthaburi, Thailand	25,000	Hard	(Russia) Olga Doroshina	(Japan) Akiko Omae (Japan) Miyabi Inoue	4–6, 6–3, [11–9]
Loss	28–21	Aug 2016	ITF Bagnatica, Italy	25,000	Clay	(Switzerland) Conny Perrin	(Italy) Alice Matteucci (Italy) Camilla Rosatello	4–6, 7–5, [5–10]
Win	29–21	Sep 2016	ITF Hua Hin, Thailand	25,000	Hard	(Brazil) Laura Pigossi	(China) Wei Zhanlan (China) Zhao Qianqian	6–3, 2–6, [10–4]
Win	30–21	Oct 2016	ITF Shymkent, Kazakhstan	10,000	Clay	(Kazakhstan) Kamila Kerimbayeva	(Russia) Anna Pribylova (Germany) Julyette Steur	6–2, 6–3
Win	31–21	Dec 2016	ITF Casablanca, Morocco	10,000	Clay	(Romania) Daiana Negreanu	(Belgium) Déborah Kerfs (Romania) Ioana Loredana Roșca	6–4, 6–2
Loss	31–22	Dec 2016	ITF Casablanca, Morocco	10,000	Clay	(Belgium) Déborah Kerfs	(Germany) Katharina Hering (Spain) Olga Parres Azcoitia	1–6, 2–6
Loss	31–23	Jan 2017	ITF Hammamet, Tunisia	15,000	Clay	(Romania) Cristina Dinu	(Brazil) Laura Pigossi (Spain) María Teresa Torró Flor	2–6, 4–6
Loss	31–24	Feb 2017	ITF Hammamet, Tunisia	15,000	Clay	(Chinese Taipei) Hsu Chieh-yu	(Italy) Giorgia Marchetti (Italy) Angelica Moratelli	4–6, 3–6
Loss	31–25	Mar 2017	ITF Sharm El Sheikh, Egypt	15,000	Hard	(Ukraine) Valeriya Strakhova	(Russia) Olga Doroshina (Russia) Polina Monova	1–6, 1–6
Win	32–25	Apr 2017	ITF Shymkent, Kazakhstan	15,000	Clay	(Belarus) Ilona Kremen	(Russia) Anastasia Gasanova (Russia) Anastasia Pribylova	6–4, 6–1
Win	33–25	Apr 2017	ITF Shymkent, Kazakhstan	15,000	Clay	(Belarus) Ilona Kremen	(Ukraine) Veronika Kapshay (Moldova) Alexandra Perper	7–6^{(2)}, 6–1
Loss	33–26	Aug 2017	Mençuna Cup, Turkey	60,000	Hard	(Bulgaria) Elitsa Kostova	(Brazil) Gabriela Cé (India) Ankita Raina	2–6, 3–6
Win	34–26	Sep 2017	ITF Almaty, Kazakhstan	25,000	Clay	(Brazil) Gabriela Cé	(Uzbekistan) Nigina Abduraimova (Uzbekistan) Akgul Amanmuradova	6–4, 3–6, [10–7]
Win	35–26	Oct 2017	ITF Óbidos, Portugal	25,000	Carpet	(Bulgaria) Elitsa Kostova	(Italy) Georgia Brescia (Italy) Alice Matteucci	w/o
Win	36–26	Oct 2017	ITF Óbidos, Portugal	25,000	Carpet	(Russia) Olga Doroshina	(Turkey) Berfu Cengiz (United Kingdom) Katie Swan	6–2, 6–2
Win	37–26	Oct 2017	ITF Óbidos, Portugal	25,000	Carpet	(Russia) Olga Doroshina	(Belarus) Lizaveta Hancharova (Italy) Dalila Spiteri	6–0, 6–2
Loss	37–27	Nov 2017	Pune Open, India	25,000	Hard	(Chinese Taipei) Lee Pei-chi	(Romania) Jaqueline Cristian (Slovakia) Tereza Mihalíková	6–4, 3–6, [7–10]
Win	38–27	Nov 2017	ITF Dakar, Senegal	25,000	Hard	(Montenegro) Ana Veselinović	(Greece) Valentini Grammatikopoulou (Netherlands) Rosalie van der Hoek	6–3, 6–3
Win	39–27	Nov 2017	Open de Valencia, Spain	25,000	Clay	(Spain) Cristina Bucșa	(Spain) Georgina García Pérez (Venezuela) Andrea Gámiz	7–6^{(1)}, 7–6^{(5)}
Loss	39–28	Dec 2017	ITF Nules, Spain	25,000	Clay	(Netherlands) Cindy Burger	(Ecuador) Charlotte Römer (Spain) Olga Sáez Larra	6–2, 1–6, [7–10]
Win	40–28	Mar 2018	ITF Gwalior, India	25,000	Hard	(Montenegro) Ana Veselinović	(United Kingdom) Freya Christie (Uzbekistan) Albina Khabibulina	6–3, 2–6, [10–5]
Win	41–28	May 2018	ITF Monzón, Spain	25,000	Clay	(Spain) Cristina Bucșa	(United Kingdom) Sarah Beth Grey (United Kingdom) Olivia Nicholls	6–2, 5–7, [10–8]
Win	42–28	Aug 2018	ITF Las Palmas, Spain	25,000	Clay	(Norway) Ulrikke Eikeri	(Turkey) Başak Eraydın (Turkey) İpek Soylu	6–2, 6–4
Loss	42–29	Aug 2018	ITF Almaty, Kazakhstan	25,000	Clay	(Russia) Polina Monova	(Slovakia) Tereza Mihalíková (Russia) Valeriya Strakhova	6–1, 2–6, [5–10]
Loss	42–30	Nov 2018	ITF Minsk, Belarus	25,000	Hard (i)	(Russia) Polina Monova	(Belarus) Ilona Kremen (Belarus) Iryna Shymanovich	3–6, 6–7^{(3)}
Win	43–30	Jun 2019	ITF Madrid, Spain	W25	Hard	(Russia) Polina Monova	(Japan) Ange Oby Kajuru (Slovakia) Laura Maluniaková	6–4, 6–2
Loss	43–31	Nov 2019	Open Nantes Atlantique, France	W60	Hard (i)	(Germany) Vivian Heisen	(Uzbekistan) Akgul Amanmuradova (Georgia (country)) Ekaterine Gorgodze	6–7^{(2)}, 3–6
Loss	43–32	Jan 2020	ITF Kazan, Russia	W25	Hard (i)	(Russia) Natela Dzalamidze	(Russia) Ekaterina Yashina (Russia) Anastasia Zakharova	2–6, 4–6
Win	44–32	Jan 2022	ITF Manacor, Spain	W25	Hard	(Czech Republic) Anastasia Dețiuc	(Netherlands) Quirine Lemoine (Netherlands) Bibiane Schoofs	6–2, 6–3
Loss	44–33	Apr 2024	Oeiras Ladies Open, Portugal	W100	Clay	(Chinese Taipei) Wu Fang-hsien	(Portugal) Francisca Jorge (Portugal) Matilde Jorge	2–6, 0–6

== Year-end rankings ==
Year	2010	2011	2012	2013	2014	2015	2016	2017	2018	2019	2020	2021	2022	2023	2024
Singles	1110	–	620	348	626	500	398	448	384	567	654	940	–	–	–
Doubles	–	–	418	341	400	474	195	190	107	98	94	117	53	60	52

== Awards ==
- The Russian Cup in the nomination Student Tennis Players of the Year

== See also ==
- Youssef Hossam, tennis player accused of match fixing
