= Valeria Savinykh =

Russian tennis player

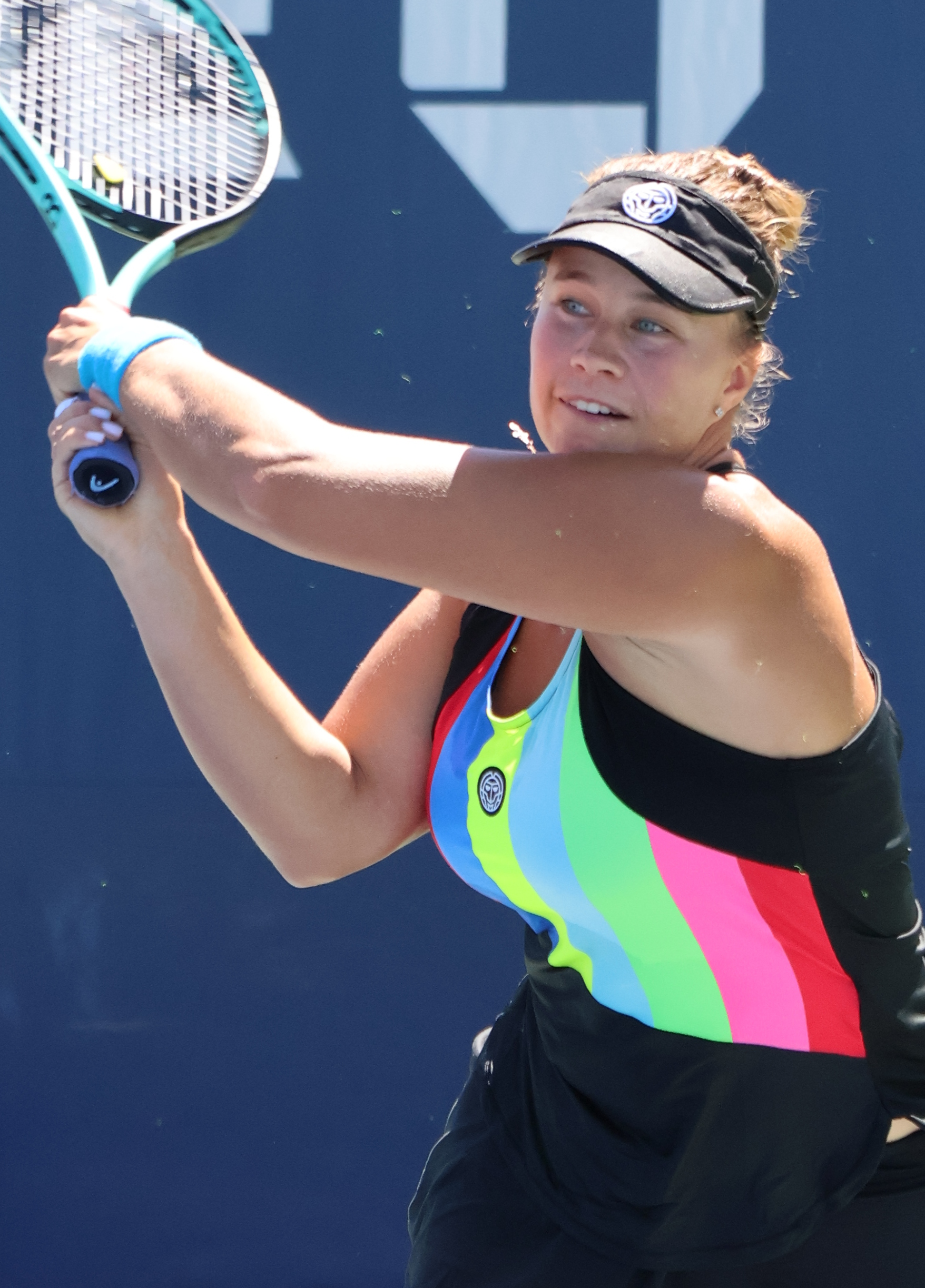
- Savinykh at the 2023 US Open
- Country (sports): Russia
- Residence: Yekaterinburg, Russia
- Born: 20 February 1991 (age 35) Sverdlovsk, RSFSR, Soviet Union (now Yekaterinburg, Russia)
- Height: 1.67 m (5 ft 6 in)
- Plays: Right (two-handed backhand)
- Coach: Tomasz Iwanski
- Prize money: US$ 969,424

Singles
- Career record: 499–383
- Career titles: 10 ITF
- Highest ranking: No. 99 (9 April 2012)
- Current ranking: No. 552 (9 November 2026)

Grand Slam singles results
- Australian Open: 3R (2013)
- French Open: Q1 (2011, 2012, 2013, 2020, 2021, 2022)
- Wimbledon: Q3 (2012)
- US Open: Q3 (2012)

Doubles
- Career record: 299–212
- Career titles: 1 WTA 125, 24 ITF
- Highest ranking: No. 98 (20 November 2017)
- Current ranking: No. 498 (9 November 2026)

Grand Slam doubles results
- Wimbledon: 2R (2012)
- Last updated on: 15 November 2026.

Valeria Dmitrievna Savinykh (Russian: Валерия Дмитриевна Савиных; born 20 February 1991) is a Russian tennis player.

In April 2012, she achieved a career-high singles ranking of world No. 99. On 20 November 2017, she peaked at No. 98 in the WTA doubles rankings. Savinykh has won one doubles title on the WTA Challenger Tour along with ten singles and 24 doubles titles on the ITF Circuit.

== Personal life ==
Her father, Dmitry, introduced her into tennis at age five, and her mother, Elena, often travels with her. She trains in her hometown of Yekaterinburg (previously at the SotoTennis Academy and Ad in Tennis Academy in Barcelona, Spain; AZS Lodz in Poland; Swiss Tennis Academy in Biel/Bienne; Vienna; and Porto). Since November 2012, she has been coached by Tomasz Iwański.

== Performance timeline ==
Key
W	F	SF	QF	#R	RR	Q#	DNQ	A	NH

(W) winner; (F) finalist; (SF) semifinalist; (QF) quarterfinalist; (#R) rounds 4, 3, 2, 1; (RR) round-robin stage; (Q#) qualification round; (DNQ) did not qualify; (A) absent; (NH) not held; (SR) strike rate (events won / competed); (W–L) win–loss record.
To avoid confusion and double counting, these charts are updated at the conclusion of a tournament or when the player's participation has ended.

=== Singles ===
Current through the 2023 Hong Kong Open.

Tournament	2010	2011	2012	2013	...	2018	2019	2020	2021	2022	2023	SR	W–L
Grand Slam tournaments
Australian Open	A	A	1R	3R		A	A	Q2	1R	Q2	A	0 / 3	2–3
French Open	A	Q1	Q1	Q1		A	A	Q1	Q1	Q1	A	0 / 0	0–0
Wimbledon	A	Q2	Q3	A		A	Q1	NH	Q1	A	A	0 / 0	0–0
US Open	Q2	Q2	Q3	A		A	Q2	A	Q1	A	Q2	0 / 0	0–0
Win–Loss	0–0	0–0	0–1	2–1		0–0	0–0	0–0	0–1	0–0	0–0	0 / 3	2–3
WTA 1000
Miami Open	A	A	2R	Q2		A	A	NH	A	A	A	0 / 1	1–1
Italian Open	A	A	A	A		A	A	A	A	Q1	A	0 / 0	0–0
Pan Pacific / Wuhan Open	A	A	Q1	A		A	A	NH				0 / 0	0–0
Career statistics
Tournaments	0	2	6	3		1	1	3	0	0	4	Career total: 20	
Overall win-loss	0–0	2–2	3–6	2–3		0–1	0–1	0–3	0–0	0–0	2–4	0 / 20	9–20

== WTA Tour finals ==
=== Doubles: 2 (2 runner-ups) ===
Legend WTA 250 (0–2)	Legend Hard (0–2)

Result	Date	Tournament	Tier	Surface	Partner	Opponents	Score
Loss	Mar 2013	Brasil Tennis Cup, Brazil	International (Note: The WTA International tournaments were reclassified as WTA 250 tournaments in 2021.)	Hard	(United Kingdom) Anne Keothavong	(Spain) Anabel Medina Garrigues (Kazakhstan) Yaroslava Shvedova	0–6, 4–6
Loss	Sep 2019	Japan Women's Open, Japan	International	Hard	(United States) Christina McHale	(Japan) Misaki Doi (Japan) Nao Hibino	6–3, 4–6, [4–10]

== WTA 125 finals ==
=== Doubles: 1 (title) ===
Result	Date	Tournament	Surface	Partner	Opponents	Score
Win	Nov 2017	Open de Limoges, France	Hard (i)	(Belgium) Maryna Zanevska	(France) Chloé Paquet (France) Pauline Parmentier	6–0, 6–2

== ITF Circuit finals ==
=== Singles: 27 (10 titles, 17 runner-ups) ===
Legend $100,000 tournaments (1–0) $50/60,000 tournaments (1–4) $40/50,000 tournaments (1–2) $25,000 tournaments (5–6) $10/15,000 tournaments (2–5)	Legend Hard (10–14) Clay (0–3)

Result	W–L	Date	Tournament	Tier	Surface	Opponent	Score
Loss	0–1	Jul 2008	ITF Rabat, Morocco	10,000	Clay	(Switzerland) Lisa Sabino	1–6, 4–6
Loss	0–2	Sep 2008	ITF Limoges, France	10,000	Hard (i)	(Russia) Marina Melnikova	1–0 ret.
Loss	0–3	Jun 2010	ITF Båstad, Sweden	25,000	Clay	(Sweden) Sofia Arvidsson	3–6, 1–6
Loss	0–4	Nov 2010	Open Nantes Atlantique, France	50,000	Hard (i)	(Czech Republic) Lucie Hradecká	3–6, 1–6
Win	1–4	Apr 2011	Soweto Open, South Africa	100,000	Hard	(Czech Republic) Petra Cetkovská	6–1, 6–3
Loss	1–5	Dec 2011	Ankara Cup, Turkey	50,000	Hard (i)	(France) Kristina Mladenovic	5–7, 7–5, 1–6
Loss	1–6	May 2014	Nana Trophy Tunis, Tunisia	25,000	Clay	(Tunisia) Ons Jabeur	3–6, 6–7^{(4)}
Loss	1–7	Jun 2016	ITF Puszczykowo, Poland	10,000	Hard	(Czech Republic) Marie Bouzková	2–6, 0–6
Loss	1–8	Jul 2016	ITF Astana, Kazakhstan	10,000	Hard	(Belarus) Vera Lapko	6–7^{(3)}, 6–3, 4–6
Win	2–8	Oct 2016	ITF Heraklion, Greece	10,000	Hard	(United Kingdom) Gabriella Taylor	6–2, 4–1 ret.
Loss	2–9	May 2017	ITF Santarém, Portugal	15,000	Hard	(Spain) Cristina Bucșa	4–6, 4–6
Win	3–9	Jun 2017	ITF Montemor-o-Novo, Portugal	15,000	Hard	(Germany) Sarah-Rebecca Sekulic	6–2, 6–0
Win	4–9	Aug 2017	Mençuna Cup, Turkey	60,000	Hard	(Turkey) Ayla Aksu	3–6, 7–6^{(10)}, 7–6^{(5)}
Loss	4–10	Nov 2018	GB Pro-Series Shrewsbury, UK	25,000	Hard (i)	(United Kingdom) Maia Lumsden	1–6, 6–4, 3–6
Win	5–10	Dec 2018	ITF Pune Open, India	25,000	Hard	(China) Lu Jiajing	3–6, 6–2, 7–6^{(7)}
Win	6–10	May 2019	ITF Namangan, Uzbekistan	W25	Hard	(Hong Kong) Eudice Chong	6–0, 4–6, 7–5
Loss	6–11	May 2019	ITF Singapore	W25	Hard	(Papua New Guinea) Abigail Tere-Apisah	3–6, 2–6
Win	7–11	Aug 2019	ITF Taipei, Taiwan	W25	Hard	(Japan) Risa Ushijima	7–5, 6–2
Win	8–11	Apr 2021	ITF Calvi, France	W25+H	Hard	(Switzerland) Susan Bandecchi	6–1, 6–4
Loss	8–12	Jul 2021	President's Cup, Kazakhstan	W60	Hard	(Georgia (country)) Mariam Bolkvadze	6–4, 3–6, 2–6
Loss	8–13	Jun 2022	ITF Ra'anana, Israel	W25	Hard	(Russia) Maria Timofeeva	1–6, 2–6
Win	9–13	Dec 2022	ITF Navi Mumbai, India	W25	Hard	(Indonesia) Priska Madelyn Nugroho	6–2, 7–6^{(4)}
Loss	9–14	Jan 2023	ITF Nonthaburi, Thailand	W40	Hard	(Ukraine) Kateryna Volodko	2–6, 3–6
Loss	9–15	May 2023	ITF Kachreti, Georgia	W25	Hard	(China) Bai Zhuoxuan	4–6, 5–7
Win	10–15	Jul 2023	ITF Palma del Rio, Spain	W40	Hard	(France) Harmony Tan	7–5, 6–3
Loss	10–16	Aug 2023	ITF Barcelona, Spain	W60	Hard	(Australia) Arina Rodionova	4–6, 7–5, 1–6
Loss	10–17	Mar 2024	ITF Murska Sobota, Slovenia	W50	Hard (i)	(Slovakia) Viktória Hrunčáková	0–6, 3–6

=== Doubles: 50 (24 titles, 26 runner-ups) ===
Legend $100,000 tournaments (2–3) $75,000 tournaments (0–1) $50/60,000 tournaments (2–6) $25,000 tournaments (14–13) $10/15,000 tournaments (6–3)	Legend Hard (16–20) Clay (7–5) Carpet (1–1)

Result	W–L	Date	Tournament	Tier	Surface	Partner	Opponents	Score
Loss	0–1	Aug 2007	ITF Gardone Val Trompia, Italy	10k	Clay	(Italy) Anastasia Grymalska	(Italy) Alice Balducci (France) Kildine Chevalier	6–3, 6–7^{(5)}, 3–6
Win	1–1	Jul 2008	ITF Prokuplje, Serbia	10k	Clay	(Serbia) Ljubica Avramović	(Serbia) Zorica Petrov (Slovenia) Anja Prislan	w/o
Loss	1–2	Jul 2008	ITF Rabat, Morocco	10k	Clay	(Ukraine) Yuliana Umanets	(Switzerland) Lisa Sabino (Italy) Benedetta Davato	2–6, 1–6
Win	2–2	Oct 2008	Lagos Open, Nigeria	25k	Hard	(Russia) Elena Chalova	(India) Rushmi Chakravarthi (India) Isha Lakhani	6–7^{(6)}, 6–3, [10–7]
Loss	2–3	Dec 2008	Dubai Tennis Challenge, UAE	75k	Hard	(Russia) Elena Chalova	(Slovenia) Maša Zec Peškirič (France) Irena Pavlovic	6–7^{(6)}, 6–3, [3–10]
Loss	2–4	Apr 2009	Yugra Cup, Russia	50k	Carpet (i)	(Georgia (country)) Oksana Kalashnikova	(Belarus) Ksenia Milevskaya (Ukraine) Lesia Tsurenko	2–6, 3–6
Win	3–4	May 2009	ITF Ain Sukhna, Egypt	10k	Clay	(Sweden) Anna Brazhnikova	(Russia) Galina Fokina (Russia) Anna Morgina	3–6, 6–3, [10–6]
Loss	3–5	Aug 2009	ITF Moscow, Russia	25k	Clay	(Russia) Marina Shamayko	(Russia) Ekaterina Lopes (Australia) Arina Rodionova	3–6, 3–6
Loss	3–6	Oct 2009	ITF Granada, Spain	25k	Hard	(Argentina) Betina Jozami	(Russia) Nina Bratchikova (Australia) Arina Rodionova	1–6, 6–3, [5–10]
Win	4–6	Feb 2010	ITF Sutton, United Kingdom	25k	Hard (i)	(Greece) Eirini Georgatou	(United Kingdom) Naomi Cavaday (United Kingdom) Anna Smith	7–5, 2–6, [10–8]
Loss	4–7	May 2010	ITF Brescia, Italy	25k	Clay	(France) Iryna Brémond	(United Kingdom) Naomi Cavaday (Russia) Anastasia Pivovarova	3–6, 7–6^{(5)}, [8–10]
Win	5–7	Jul 2010	ITF Zwevegem, Belgium	25k	Clay	(Netherlands) Richèl Hogenkamp	(Russia) Irina Khromacheva (Ukraine) Maryna Zanevska	6–3, 3–6, [10–7]
Loss	5–8	Oct 2010	GB Pro-Series Glasgow, UK	25k	Hard (i)	(Greece) Eirini Georgatou	(Denmark) Karen Barbat (Italy) Julia Mayr	w/o
Loss	5–9	Nov 2010	ITF Bratislava, Slovakia	25k	Hard (i)	(France) Claire Feuerstein	(France) Irena Pavlovic (Finland) Emma Laine	4–6, 4–6
Win	6–9	Jan 2011	Open Andrézieux-Bouthéon, France	25k	Hard (i)	(Croatia) Darija Jurak	(Netherlands) Kiki Bertens (Netherlands) Richèl Hogenkamp	6–3, 7–6^{(0)}
Win	7–9	Apr 2011	Torneo Conchita Martínez, Spain	50k	Hard	(Russia) Elena Bovina	(Georgia (country)) Margalita Chakhnashvili (Croatia) Ivana Lisjak	6–1, 2–6, [10–4]
Win	8–9	Oct 2011	Tennis Classic of Troy, United States	50k	Hard	(Russia) Elena Bovina	(United States) Varvara Lepchenko (United States) Mashona Washington	7–6^{(6)}, 6–3
Win	9–9	May 2014	Nana Trophy, Tunisia	25k	Clay	(Venezuela) Andrea Gámiz	(Russia) Marina Melnikova (Spain) Beatriz García Vidagany	6–4, 6–1
Win	10–9	Jun 2014	ITF La Marsa, Tunisia	25k	Clay	(Venezuela) Andrea Gámiz	(Switzerland) Xenia Knoll (Turkey) Pemra Özgen	1–6, 7–6^{(6)}, [11–9]
Loss	10–10	Oct 2014	Abierto Tampico, Mexico	50k	Hard	(Ukraine) Kateryna Bondarenko	(Croatia) Petra Martić (United States) Maria Sanchez	6–3, 3–6, [2–10]
Loss	10–11	Dec 2014	ITF Mérida, Mexico	25k	Hard	(Venezuela) Andrea Gámiz	(Germany) Tatjana Maria (Mexico) Renata Zarazúa	4–6, 1–6
Win	11–11	Feb 2016	ITF Palma Nova, Spain	10k	Clay	(Ukraine) Alyona Sotnikova	(United Kingdom) Amanda Carreras (Italy) Alice Savoretti	2–6, 6–4, [10–6]
Loss	11–12	Apr 2016	ITF Heraklion, Greece	10k	Hard	(Ukraine) Alyona Sotnikova	(United Kingdom) Freya Christie (South Africa) Chanel Simmonds	4–6, 0–6
Win	12–12	Apr 2016	ITF Heraklion, Greece	10k	Hard	(Ukraine) Alyona Sotnikova	(Russia) Kseniia Bekker (Russia) Alina Silich	4–6, 6–4, [10–7]
Win	13–12	Jun 2016	ITF Puszczykowo, Poland	10k	Hard	(Poland) Weronika Foryś	(Poland) Olga Brózda (Poland) Katarzyna Kawa	7–6^{(4)}, 6–4
Win	14–12	Jul 2016	Bella Cup, Poland	25k	Clay	(Romania) Irina Bara	(Uzbekistan) Akgul Amanmuradova (Russia) Valentyna Ivakhnenko	6–3, 4–6, [10–7]
Loss	14–13	Sep 2016	ITF Almaty, Kazakhstan	25k	Clay	(Russia) Polina Monova	(Russia) Valentyna Ivakhnenko (Russia) Anastasiya Komardina	5–7, 4–6
Loss	14–14	Dec 2016	Dubai Tennis Challenge, UAE	100k	Hard	(Chinese Taipei) Hsieh Su-wei	(Luxembourg) Mandy Minella (Serbia) Nina Stojanović	3–6, 6–3, [4–10]
Loss	14–15	Mar 2017	Pingshan Open, China	60k	Hard	(Japan) Eri Hozumi	(Ukraine) Lyudmyla Kichenok (Ukraine) Nadiia Kichenok	4–6, 4–6
Win	15–15	Apr 2017	ITF Nanning, China	25k	Hard	(China) Lu Jingjing	(China) Gai Ao (China) Guo Hanyu	6–4, 6–4
Win	16–15	May 2017	ITF Santarém, Portugal	15k	Hard	(Ukraine) Valeriya Strakhova	(Spain) Cristina Bucșa (Russia) Ksenia Kuznetsova	6–3, 6–2
Win	17–15	Jul 2017	ITF Winnipeg, Canada	25k	Hard	(Japan) Hiroko Kuwata	(Australia) Kimberly Birrell (United States) Caroline Dolehide	6–4, 7–6^{(4)}
Win	18–15	Jul 2017	ITF Gatineau, Canada	25k	Hard	(Japan) Hiroko Kuwata	(Australia) Kimberly Birrell (United Kingdom) Emily Webley-Smith	4–6, 6–3, [10–5]
Loss	18–16	Aug 2017	Lexington Challenger, United States	60k	Hard	(Japan) Hiroko Kuwata	(Australia) Priscilla Hon (Belarus) Vera Lapko	3–6, 4–6
Loss	18–17	Feb 2018	Launceston International, Australia	25k	Hard	(United Kingdom) Laura Robson	(Australia) Jessica Moore (Australia) Ellen Perez	6–7^{(5)}, 4–6
Win	19–17	Sep 2018	ITF Óbidos, Portugal	25k	Carpet	(Poland) Katarzyna Piter	(Georgia (country)) Mariam Bolkvadze (Portugal) Ines Murta	6–3, 6–2
Win	20–17	Nov 2018	ITF Wirral, UK	25k	Hard (i)	(United Kingdom) Freya Christie	(United Kingdom) Sarah Beth Grey (United Kingdom) Olivia Nicholls	6–4, 7–5
Loss	20–18	Dec 2018	Pune Open, India	25k	Hard	(Canada) Sharon Fichman	(Indonesia) Beatrice Gumulya (Montenegro) Ana Veselinović	6–7^{(4)}, 6–1, [9–11]
Win	21–18	Feb 2019	Midland Tennis Classic, US	W100	Hard (i)	(Belarus) Olga Govortsova	(United States) Coco Gauff (United States) Ann Li	6–4, 6–0
Loss	21–19	Feb 2019	GB Pro-Series Shrewsbury, UK	W60	Hard (i)	(United Kingdom) Freya Christie	(Australia) Arina Rodionova (Belgium) Yanina Wickmayer	2–6, 5–7
Loss	21–20	Mar 2019	ITF Kazan, Russia	W25	Hard (i)	(United Kingdom) Freya Christie	(Russia) Olga Doroshina (Russia) Polina Monova	4–6, 7–6^{(4)}, [9–11]
Loss	21–21	Feb 2020	Midland Tennis Classic, US	W100	Hard (i)	(Belgium) Yanina Wickmayer	(United States) Maria Sanchez (United States) Caroline Dolehide	3–6, 4–6
Win	22–21	Jul 2021	ITF Palma del Río, Spain	W25	Hard	(Japan) Eri Hozumi	(Japan) Himari Sato (Switzerland) Lulu Sun	7–6^{(6)}, 6–3
Loss	22–22	Aug 2021	Landisville Challenge, US	W100	Hard	(United Kingdom) Samantha Murray Sharan	(United States) Hanna Chang (United States) Alexa Glatch	6–7^{(3)}, 6–3, [9–11]
Loss	22–23	Feb 2022	GB Pro-Series Glasgow, UK	W25	Hard (i)	(Lithuania) Justina Mikulskytė	(United States) Quinn Gleason (United States) Catherine Harrison	4–6, 1–6
Loss	22–24	Apr 2022	ITF Pretoria, South Africa	W60	Hard	(Hungary) Tímea Babos	(Hong Kong) Eudice Chong (Hong Kong) Cody Wong	5–7, 7–5, [11–13]
Loss	22–25	Apr 2022	ITF Monastir, Tunisia	W25	Hard	(New Zealand) Paige Hourigan	(Uzbekistan) Nigina Abduraimova (Japan) Hiroko Kuwata	1–6, 6–3, [10–12]
Loss	22–26	Jun 2022	ITF Madrid, Spain	W25	Hard	(Sweden) Jacqueline Cabaj Awad	(Spain) Yvonne Cavallé Reimers (Spain) Guiomar Maristany	4–6, 4–6
Win	23–26	Jul 2022	ITF Palma del Río, Spain	W25+H	Hard	(Hungary) Fanny Stollár	(Spain) Celia Cerviño Ruiz (Lithuania) Justina Mikulskytė	7–6^{(3)}, 6–2
Win	24–26	Nov 2026	Incheon Open, South Korea	W100	Hard	(Russia) Ekaterina Ovcharenko	(Japan) Natsumi Kawaguchi (Japan) Hikaru Sato	7–5, 1–6, [13–11]
