= Elitsa Kostova =

Bulgarian tennis player

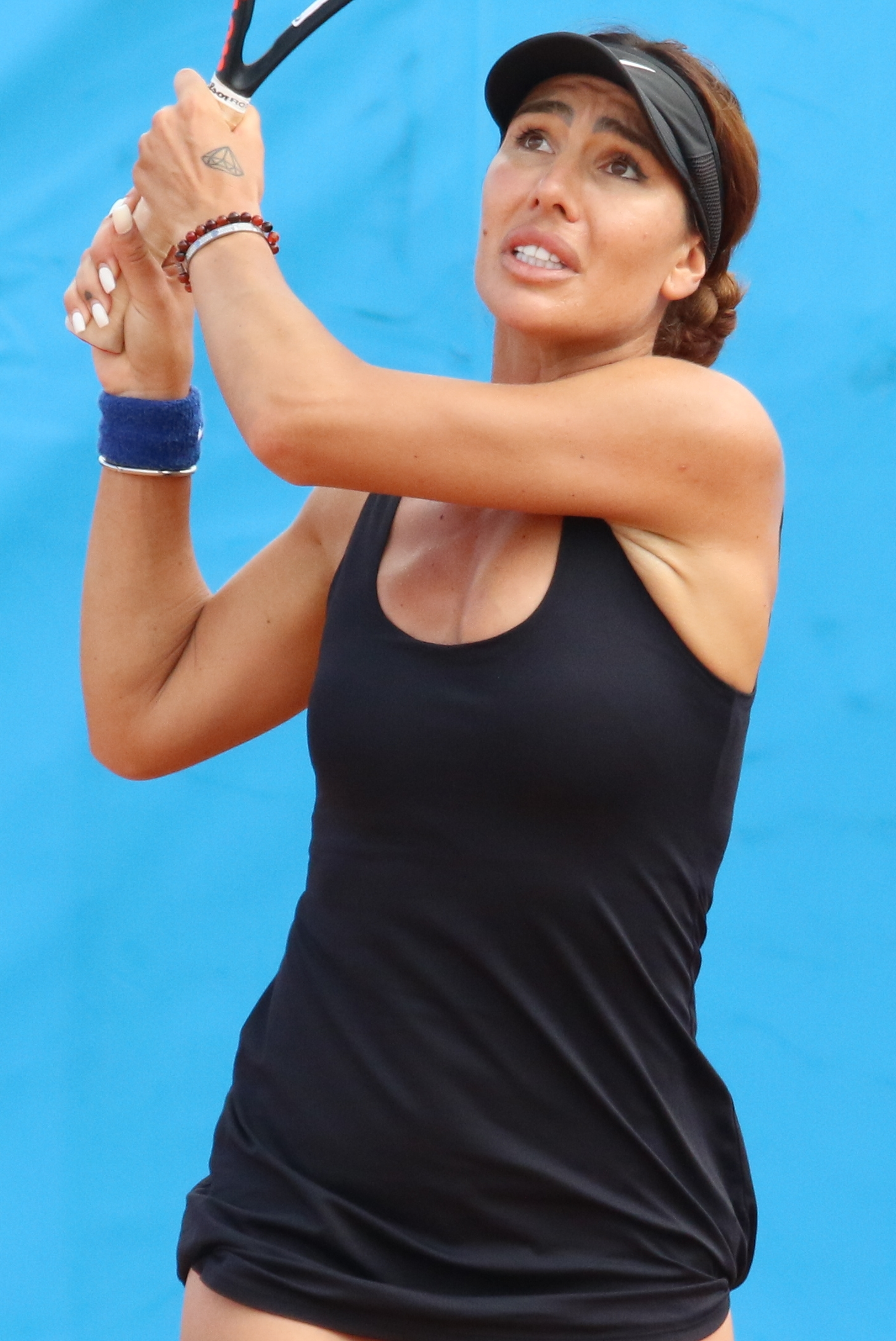
- Kostova at Biarritz, 2021
- Country (sports): Bulgaria
- Residence: Kardzhali, Bulgaria
- Born: 10 April 1990 (age 36) Haskovo, Bulgaria
- Height: 1.72 m (5 ft 8 in)
- Turned pro: 2006
- Retired: 2021
- Plays: Right-handed (two-handed backhand)
- Coach: Radu Popescu
- Prize money: US$ 637,567

Singles
- Career record: 439–383
- Career titles: 6 ITF
- Highest ranking: No. 130 (12 September 2016)

Grand Slam singles results
- Australian Open: Q2 (2012, 2018)
- French Open: Q2 (2017, 2020, 2021)
- Wimbledon: Q2 (2015, 2017, 2021)
- US Open: Q3 (2016)

Doubles
- Career record: 168–185
- Career titles: 7 ITF
- Highest ranking: No. 154 (26 October 2015)

Team competitions
- Fed Cup: 16–18

Elitsa Kostova (Bulgarian: Елица Костова) (born 10 April 1990) is a former professional Bulgarian tennis player.

On 12 September 2016, she reached her highest WTA singles ranking of No. 130, achieved on 12 September 2016, her best doubles ranking is world No. 154, reached on 26 October 2015. Playing for Bulgaria Fed Cup team, she has a win–loss record of 16–18.

== Career ==
At the $25k tournament in Wellington, New Zealand, held in November 2010, Kostova, ranked 254 in the world, achieved her greatest victory in her career. She defeated world No. 42, Jarmila Groth, in the semifinals in two sets. In the final, she lost to world No. 241, Erika Sema, in three sets.

Kostova won her first match in a WTA Tour main draw by beating Alizé Lim at the 2014 Bucharest Open, after coming through the qualifying competition. At the 2015 Rio Open, she reached her first WTA semifinal in doubles along with Hsu Chieh-yu. They lost to defending champions, Irina-Camelia Begu and María Irigoyen, in straight sets.

In July 2016 came her biggest win when she won the final of the Europe Tennis Center Ladies Open in Budapest against fellow Fed Cup teammate Viktoriya Tomova.

At the 2018 Ladies Championship Gstaad she reached the second round, which she has reached on seven occasions on the WTA level going back to 2014, but lost to Markéta Vondroušová.

She retired in 2021 with her last match played at the Belgrade Challenger losing to eventual finalist Arantxa Rus.

== Grand Slam performance timeline ==
Key
| W | F | SF | QF | #R | RR | Q# | DNQ | A | NH |

(W) winner; (F) finalist; (SF) semifinalist; (QF) quarterfinalist; (#R) rounds 4, 3, 2, 1; (RR) round-robin stage; (Q#) qualification round; (DNQ) did not qualify; (A) absent; (NH) not held; (SR) strike rate (events won / competed); (W–L) win–loss record.
To avoid confusion and double counting, these charts are updated at the conclusion of a tournament or when the player's participation has ended.

=== Singles ===
| Tournament | 2011 | 2012 | 2013 | 2014 | 2015 | 2016 | 2017 | 2018 | 2019 | 2020 | 2021 | W–L |
|---|---|---|---|---|---|---|---|---|---|---|---|---|
| Australian Open | A | Q2 | A | A | Q1 | A | Q1 | Q2 | Q1 | Q1 | Q1 | 0–0 |
| French Open | Q1 | Q1 | A | A | Q1 | Q1 | Q2 | Q1 | A | Q2 | Q2 | 0–0 |
| Wimbledon | Q1 | Q1 | A | A | Q2 | Q1 | Q2 | Q1 | A | NH | Q2 | 0–0 |
| US Open | Q2 | Q2 | A | Q1 | Q1 | Q3 | A | Q1 | Q1 | A | A | 0–0 |
| Win–loss | 0–0 | 0–0 | 0–0 | 0–0 | 0–0 | 0–0 | 0–0 | 0–0 | 0–0 | 0–0 | 0–0 | 0–0 |
Career statistics
| Year-end ranking | 148 | 224 | 264 | 219 | 252 | 132 | 205 | 214 | 193 | 210 | 316 | |

== ITF Circuit finals ==
=== Singles: 25 (6 titles, 19 runner-ups) ===
| Legend $100,000 tournaments $50/60,000 tournaments $25,000 tournaments $10/15,000 tournaments | Finals by surface Hard (2–11) Clay (4–8) |

| Result | W–L | Date | Tournament | Tier | Surface | Opponent | Score |
|---|---|---|---|---|---|---|---|
| Loss | 0–1 | Apr 2008 | ITF Antalya, Turkey | 10,000 | Clay | (Netherlands) Michelle Gerards | 2–6, 6–2, 6–7^{(3)} |
| Win | 1–1 | Jun 2008 | ITF Alcobaça, Portugal | 10,000 | Hard | (United Kingdom) Amanda Carreras | 3–6, 6–2, 6–2 |
| Loss | 1–2 | Dec 2008 | ITF Vinaròs, Spain | 10,000 | Clay | (Switzerland) Conny Perrin | 4–6, 2–6 |
| Win | 2–2 | Nov 2009 | ITF Le Havre, France | 10,000 | Clay (i) | (Germany) Sina Haas | 6–0, 6–4 |
| Loss | 2–3 | Feb 2010 | ITF Albufeira, Portugal | 10,000 | Hard | (Italy) Evelyn Mayr | 4–6, 4–6 |
| Loss | 2–4 | Jul 2010 | ITF Mont-de-Marsan, France | 25,000 | Clay | (Czech Republic) Petra Cetkovská | 2–6, 2–6 |
| Loss | 2–5 | Jul 2010 | ITF Les Contamines, France | 25,000 | Hard | (Czech Republic) Andrea Hlaváčková | 5–7, 6–0, 4–6 |
| Loss | 2–6 | Nov 2010 | ITF Wellington, New Zealand | 25,000 | Hard | (Japan) Erika Sema | 2–6, 6–3, 4–6 |
| Loss | 2–7 | Dec 2010 | Bendigo International, Australia | 25,000 | Hard | (Hungary) Tímea Babos | 6–3, 3–6, 5–7 |
| Loss | 2–8 | Feb 2011 | ITF Vale do Lobo, Portugal | 10,000 | Hard | (Belgium) Alison van Uytvanck | 4–6, 6–4, 2–6 |
| Loss | 2–9 | Jul 2011 | Open de Pozoblanco, Spain | 50,000 | Hard | (Greece) Eleni Daniilidou | 3–6, 2–6 |
| Loss | 2–10 | Aug 2011 | Empire Slovak Open, Slovakia | 50,000 | Clay | (Austria) Yvonne Meusburger | 6–0, 2–6, 0–6 |
| Loss | 2–11 | Aug 2011 | ITF Koksijde, Belgium | 25,000 | Clay | (Netherlands) Kiki Bertens | 2–6, 1–6 |
| Win | 3–11 | Oct 2011 | ITF Dobrich, Bulgaria | 25,000 | Clay | (Romania) Elena Bogdan | 7–6^{(6)}, 6–2 |
| Loss | 3–12 | Nov 2011 | ITF Benicarló, Spain | 25,000 | Clay | (Spain) Garbiñe Muguruza | 6–7^{(3)}, 7–6^{(4)}, 3–6 |
| Loss | 3–13 | Apr 2013 | ITF Dijon, France | 15,000 | Hard (i) | (Germany) Kristina Barrois | 3–6, 5–7 |
| Loss | 3–14 | Nov 2013 | John Newcombe Challenge, United States | 50,000 | Hard | (Georgia (country)) Anna Tatishvili | 4–6, 4–6 |
| Win | 4–14 | Jun 2014 | Open de Montpellier, France | 25,000 | Clay | (Ukraine) Sofiya Kovalets | 7–5, 6–1 |
| Loss | 4–15 | Nov 2014 | ITF Sharm El Sheikh, Egypt | 25,000 | Hard | (Russia) Margarita Gasparyan | 3–6, 0–6 |
| Loss | 4–16 | Feb 2015 | Open Andrézieux-Bouthéon, France | 25,000 | Hard (i) | (Russia) Margarita Gasparyan | 4–6, 4–6 |
| Win | 5–16 | Jul 2016 | Budapest Ladies Open, Hungary | 100,000 | Clay | (Bulgaria) Viktoriya Tomova | 6–0, 7–6^{(3)} |
| Loss | 5–17 | Sep 2017 | Las Vegas Open, United States | 60,000 | Hard | (Bulgaria) Sesil Karatantcheva | 4–6, 6–4, 5–7 |
| Loss | 5–18 | Mar 2018 | ITF Pula, Italy | 25,000 | Clay | (Turkey) Başak Eraydın | 4–6, 1–6 |
| Win | 6–18 | Jun 2019 | ITF Santa Margarida, Spain | 25,000 | Hard | (Australia) Arina Rodionova | 7–5, 6–3 |
| Loss | 6–19 | Jun 2019 | Zubr Cup, Czech Republic | 25,000 | Clay | (Ukraine) Anhelina Kalinina | 1–6, 6–4, 1–6 |

=== Doubles 21 (7 titles, 14 runner-ups) ===
| Legend $100,000 tournaments $50/60,000 tournaments $25,000 tournaments $10/15,000 tournaments | Finals by surface Hard (1–9) Clay (5–5) Carpet (1–0) |

| Result | W–L | Date | Tournament | Tier | Surface | Partner | Opponents | Score |
|---|---|---|---|---|---|---|---|---|
| Loss | 0–1 | Nov 2009 | ITF Équeurdreville, France | 10,000 | Hard (i) | (France) Kinnie Laisné | (France) Elixane Lechemia (France) Constance Sibille | 4–6, 3–6 |
| Win | 1–1 | May 2011 | Zagreb Ladies Open, Croatia | 25,000 | Clay | (Poland) Barbara Sobaszkiewicz | (Croatia) Ani Mijačika (Croatia) Ana Vrljić | 1–6, 6–3, [12–10] |
| Win | 2–1 | Jun 2012 | ITF Zlín, Czech Republic | 25,000 | Clay | (Bosnia and Herzegovina) Jasmina Tinjić | (Paraguay) Verónica Cepede Royg (Brazil) Teliana Pereira | 4–6, 6–1, [10–8] |
| Loss | 2–2 | Apr 2013 | ITF Dijon, France | 15,000 | Hard (i) | (Russia) Marina Shamayko | (Italy) Nicole Clerico (Italy) Giulia Gatto-Monticone | 4–6, 2–6 |
| Loss | 2–3 | May 2013 | ITF Casablanca, Morocco | 25,000 | Clay | (Poland) Sandra Zaniewska | (Germany) Justine Ozga (Germany) Anna Zaja | 4–6, 2–6 |
| Win | 3–3 | Sep 2013 | Open de Saint-Malo, France | 25,000 | Clay | (Argentina) Florencia Molinero | (Liechtenstein) Kathinka von Deichmann (Germany) Nina Zander | 6–2, 6–4 |
| Loss | 3–4 | Dec 2013 | ITF Madrid, Spain | 25,000 | Hard | (Russia) Evgeniya Rodina | (Netherlands) Demi Schuurs (Netherlands) Eva Wacanno | 1–6, 2–6 |
| Loss | 3–5 | Jun 2014 | Bredeney Ladies Open, Germany | 25,000 | Clay | (Belgium) Ysaline Bonaventure | (Germany) Kristina Barrois (Germany) Tatjana Maria | 2–6, 2–6 |
| Loss | 3–6 | Jun 2014 | Open de Montpellier, France | 25,000 | Clay | (Chinese Taipei) Hsu Chieh-yu | (Spain) Inés Ferrer Suárez (Spain) Sara Sorribes Tormo | 6–2, 3–6, [10–12] |
| Loss | 3–7 | Dec 2014 | Ankara Cup, Turkey | 50,000 | Hard (i) | (Ukraine) Oleksandra Korashvili | (Georgia (country)) Ekaterine Gorgodze (Slovenia) Nastja Kolar | 4–6, 6–7^{(5)} |
| Loss | 3–8 | Sep 2015 | ITF Sofia, Bulgaria | 25,000 | Clay | (Czech Republic) Kateřina Kramperová | (Georgia (country)) Sofia Shapatava (Ukraine) Anastasiya Vasylyeva | 2–6, 2–6 |
| Loss | 3–9 | Sep 2015 | ITF Dobrich, Bulgaria | 25,000 | Clay | (Czech Republic) Kateřina Kramperová | (Georgia (country)) Sofia Shapatava (Ukraine) Anastasiya Vasylyeva | 2–6, 0–6 |
| Loss | 3–10 | Oct 2015 | ITF Rock Hill, United States | 25,000 | Hard | (Argentina) Florencia Molinero | (Bosnia and Herzegovina) Ema Burgić Bucko (Mexico) Renata Zarazúa | 5–7, 2–6 |
| Win | 4–10 | Jul 2017 | Contrexéville Open, France | 100,000 | Clay | (Russia) Anastasiya Komardina | (France) Manon Arcangioli (France) Sara Cakarevic | 6–3, 6–4 |
| Loss | 4–11 | Aug 2017 | ITF Chiswick, United Kingdom | 25,000 | Hard | (United Kingdom) Katy Dunne | (Romania) Laura Ioana Andrei (Germany) Julia Wachaczyk | 5–7, 5–7 |
| Loss | 4–12 | Aug 2017 | Mençuna Cup, Turkey | 60,000 | Hard | (Russia) Yana Sizikova | (Brazil) Gabriela Cé (India) Ankita Raina | 2–6, 3–6 |
| Win | 5–12 | Oct 2017 | ITF Óbidos, Portugal | 25,000 | Carpet | (Russia) Yana Sizikova | (Italy) Georgia Brescia (Italy) Alice Matteucci | w/o |
| Win | 6–12 | Sep 2018 | Budapest Ladies Open, Hungary | 60,000 | Clay | (Norway) Ulrikke Eikeri | (Hungary) Dalma Gálfi (Hungary) Réka Luca Jani | 2–6, 6–4, [10–8] |
| Loss | 6–13 | Nov 2018 | Toronto Challenger, Canada | 60,000 | Hard (i) | (Poland) Maja Chwalińska | (Canada) Sharon Fichman (United States) Maria Sanchez | 0–6, 4–6 |
| Win | 7–13 | Feb 2019 | Trnava Indoor, Slovakia | 25,000 | Hard (i) | (Romania) Elena Bogdan | (Slovakia) Michaela Hončová (Ukraine) Ganna Poznikhirenko | 7–5, 7–6^{(5)} |
| Loss | 7–14 | May 2019 | ITF Santa Margarida, Spain | 25,000 | Hard | (United Kingdom) Samantha Murray | (Georgia (country)) Sofia Shapatava (United Kingdom) Emily Webley-Smith | 4–6, 5–7 |

== Fed Cup participation ==
Elitsa Kostova debuted for the Bulgaria Fed Cup team in 2008. Since then, she has a 10–12 singles and a 6–6 doubles record (16–18 overall).

=== Singles (10–12) ===
| Edition | Round | Date | Location | Against | Surface | Opponent | W/L | Result |
|---|---|---|---|---|---|---|---|---|
| 2008 | Z1 PO | 2 Feb 2008 | Budapest (HUN) | Hungary | Carpet (i) | Gréta Arn | L | 2–6, 1–6 |
| 2009 | Z1 RR | 4 Feb 2009 | Tallinn (EST) | Estonia | Hard (i) | Maret Ani | L | 2–6, 2–6 |
| 2009 | Z1 RR | 6 Feb 2009 | Tallinn (EST) | Croatia | Hard (i) | Petra Martić | L | 2–6, 1–6 |
| 2009 | Z1 RPO | 7 Feb 2009 | Tallinn (EST) | Bosnia and Herzegovina | Hard (i) | Sandra Martinović | L | 4–6, 6–0, 2–6 |
| 2010 | Z1 RR | 5 Feb 2010 | Lisbon (POR) | Slovenia | Hard (i) | Maša Zec Peškirič | W | 7–5, 6–1 |
| 2011 | Z1 RR | 2 Feb 2011 | Eilat (ISR) | Poland | Hard | Magda Linette | W | 6–4, 4–6, 7–6^{(7–5)} |
| 2011 | Z1 RR | 4 Feb 2011 | Eilat (ISR) | Israel | Hard | Julia Glushko | L | 0–6, 2–6 |
| 2011 | Z1 RPO | 5 Feb 2011 | Eilat (ISR) | Latvia | Hard | Līga Dekmeijere | W | 6–3, 6–3 |
| 2012 | Z1 RR | 1 Feb 2012 | Eilat (ISR) | Estonia | Hard | Margit Rüütel | W | 6–2, 6–1 |
| 2012 | Z1 RR | 3 Feb 2012 | Eilat (ISR) | Austria | Hard | Patricia Mayr | L | 3–6, 3–6 |
| 2013 | Z1 RR | 8 Feb 2013 | Eilat (ISR) | Luxembourg | Hard | Laura Correia | W | 6–1, 6–3 |
| 2014 | Z1 RR | 4 Feb 2014 | Budapest (HUN) | Portugal | Hard (i) | Michelle Larcher de Brito | L | 6–4, 2–6, 6–7^{(3–7)} |
| 2014 | Z1 RR | 6 Feb 2014 | Budapest (HUN) | Turkey | Hard (i) | Çağla Büyükakçay | L | 6–7^{(3–7)}, 1–6 |
| 2014 | Z1 RPO | 9 Feb 2014 | Budapest (HUN) | Luxembourg | Hard (i) | Anne Kremer | W | 6–3, 6–7^{(7–9)}, 7–6^{(9–7)} |
| 2015 | Z1 RR | 4 Feb 2015 | Budapest (HUN) | Portugal | Hard (i) | Maria João Koehler | W | 6–2, 6–1 |
| 2015 | Z1 RR | 5 Feb 2015 | Budapest (HUN) | Belarus | Hard (i) | Olga Govortsova | L | 2–6, 3–6 |
| 2015 | Z1 RR | 6 Feb 2015 | Budapest (HUN) | Georgia | Hard (i) | Sofia Shapatava | W | 6–3, 7–6^{(7–4)} |
| 2016 | Z1 RR | 3 Feb 2016 | Eilat (ISR) | Hungary | Hard | Dalma Gálfi | W | 7–5, 6–2 |
| 2016 | Z1 RR | 4 Feb 2016 | Eilat (ISR) | Latvia | Hard | Diāna Marcinkēviča | W | 2–6, 6–3, 6–3 |
| 2016 | Z1 RR | 5 Feb 2016 | Eilat (ISR) | Belgium | Hard | Ysaline Bonaventure | L | 3–6, 6–3, 3–6 |
| 2017 | Z1 RR | 8 Feb 2017 | Tallinn (EST) | Israel | Hard (i) | Julia Glushko | L | 3–6, 5–7 |
| 2017 | Z1 RR | 10 Feb 2017 | Tallinn (EST) | Estonia | Hard (i) | Anett Kontaveit | L | 1–6, 3–6 |

=== Doubles (6–6) ===
| Edition | Round | Date | Location | Against | Partner | Surface | Opponents | W/L | Result |
|---|---|---|---|---|---|---|---|---|---|
| 2009 | Z1 RR | 4 Feb 2009 | Tallinn (EST) | Tsvetana Pironkova | Hard (i) | Estonia | Maret Ani; Kaia Kanepi | L | 1–6, 6–4, 2–6 |
| 2009 | Z1 RR | 6 Feb 2009 | Tallinn (EST) | Tsvetana Pironkova | Hard (i) | Croatia | Jelena Kostanić Tošić; Petra Martić | L | 6–7^{(3–7)}, 1–6 |
| 2009 | Z1 RPO | 7 Feb 2009 | Tallinn (EST) | Tsvetana Pironkova | Hard (i) | Bosnia and Herzegovina | Mervana Jugić-Salkić; Sandra Martinović | L | 4–6, 6–3, 3–6 |
| 2010 | Z1 RR | 5 Feb 2010 | Lisbon (POR) | Biljana Pawlowa | Hard (i) | Slovenia | Andreja Klepač; Maša Zec Peškirič | W | 6–1, 6–2 |
| 2013 | Z1 RR | 7 Feb 2013 | Eilat (ISR) | Isabella Shinikova | Hard | Netherlands | Arantxa Rus; Bibiane Schoofs | W | 6–2, 7–6^{(7–5)} |
| 2013 | Z1 RR | 9 Feb 2013 | Eilat (ISR) | Isabella Shinikova | Hard | Slovenia | Tina Rupert; Andreja Klepač | W | 6–2, 6–3 |
| 2014 | Z1 RR | 6 Feb 2014 | Budapest (HUN) | Isabella Shinikova | Hard (i) | Turkey | Çağla Büyükakçay; Pemra Özgen | L | 7–5, 1–6, 5–7 |
| 2014 | Z1 RR | 7 Feb 2014 | Budapest (HUN) | Viktoriya Tomova | Hard (i) | Belarus | Ilona Kremen; Iryna Shymanovich | W | 4–6, 6–3, 7–5 |
| 2015 | Z1 RR | 6 Feb 2015 | Budapest (HUN) | Dia Evtimova | Hard (i) | Georgia | Oksana Kalashnikova; Sofia Shapatava | L | 3–6, 2–6 |
| 2016 | Z1 PO | 6 Feb 2016 | Eilat (ISR) | Isabella Shinikova | Hard | (Georgia (country)) Georgiav | Oksana Kalashnikova; Sofia Shapatava | L | 2–6, 6–4, 4–6 |
| 2017 | Z1 RR | 8 Feb 2017 | Tallinn (EST) | Sesil Karatantcheva | Hard (i) | Israel | Julia Glushko; Shelly Krolitzky | W | 2–6, 6–3, 7–5 |
| 2017 | Z1 RR | 9 Feb 2017 | Tallinn (EST) | Sesil Karatantcheva | Hard (i) | Serbia | Bojana Marinković; Dejana Radanović | W | 6–1, 6–3 |
