= 2009 Fed Cup World Group II play-offs =

Part of tennis tournament

The 2009 World Group II play-offs were four ties which involved the losing nations of the World Group II and four nations from the three Zonal Group I competitions. Nations that won their play-off ties entered the 2010 World Group II, while losing nations joined their respective zonal groups.

== Belgium vs. Canada ==
Belgium
3
Grenslandhallen, Hasselt, Belgium
25–26 April 2009
Red clay (indoors)

Canada
2

			1	2	3
1	(Belgium) (Canada)	Tamaryn Hendler; Aleksandra Wozniak	6; 4	5; 7	2; 6
2	(Belgium) (Canada)	Yanina Wickmayer; Stéphanie Dubois	6; 1	6; 3
3	(Belgium) (Canada)	Yanina Wickmayer; Aleksandra Wozniak	6; 2	6; 4
4	(Belgium) (Canada)	Tamaryn Hendler; Stéphanie Dubois	5; 7	5; 7
5	(Belgium) (Canada)	Kirsten Flipkens / Yanina Wickmayer; Stéphanie Dubois / Aleksandra Wozniak	6; 1	6; 3

== Estonia vs. Israel ==
Estonia
3
Tondi Tennis Club, Tallinn, Estonia
25–26 April 2009
Plexipave (indoors)

Israel
2

			1	2	3
1	(Estonia) (Israel)	Kaia Kanepi; Tzipora Obziler	6; 1	6; 3
2	(Estonia) (Israel)	Maret Ani; Shahar Pe'er	1; 6	0; 6
3	(Estonia) (Israel)	Kaia Kanepi; Shahar Pe'er	6; 3	6; 4
4	(Estonia) (Israel)	Maret Ani; Tzipora Obziler	6; 4	6^{5} 7^{7}	3; 6
5	(Estonia) (Israel)	Maret Ani / Kaia Kanepi; Tzipora Obziler / Shahar Pe'er	1; 6	6; 4	8; 6

== Poland vs. Japan ==
Poland
3
Tenisowy Klub Sportowy Arka, Gdynia, Poland
25–26 April 2009
Red clay (outdoors)

Japan
2

			1	2	3
1	(Poland) (Japan)	Urszula Radwańska; Ai Sugiyama	3; 6	1; 6
2	(Poland) (Japan)	Agnieszka Radwańska; Akiko Morigami	6; 2	6; 1
3	(Poland) (Japan)	Agnieszka Radwańska; Ai Sugiyama	7^{7} 6^{5}	6; 1
4	(Poland) (Japan)	Urszula Radwańska; Ayumi Morita	2; 6	4; 6
5	(Poland) (Japan)	Klaudia Jans / Alicja Rosolska; Ayumi Morita / Ai Sugiyama	1; 6	6; 3	6; 3

== Australia vs. Switzerland ==
Australia
3
Mildura Lawn Tennis Club, Mildura, Australia
25–26 April 2009
Grass (outdoors)

Switzerland
1

			1	2	3
1	(Australia) (Switzerland)	Samantha Stosur; Amra Sadiković	6; 1	6; 2
2	(Australia) (Switzerland)	Jelena Dokić; Stefanie Vögele	7^{7} 6^{1}	6; 4
3	(Australia) (Switzerland)	Samantha Stosur; Stefanie Vögele	7^{7} 6^{2}	5; 7	6; 3
4	(Australia) (Switzerland)	Jessica Moore; Mateja Kraljevic	7; 5	4; 6	4; 6
5	(Australia) (Switzerland)	Jelena Dokić / Rennae Stubbs; Mateja Kraljevic / Amra Sadiković				not played

== See also ==
- Fed Cup structure
