= Diana Shnaider career statistics =

Career finals
Discipline	Type	Won	Lost	Total
Singles	Grand Slam	–	–	–
Singles	WTA Finals	–	–	–
Singles	WTA 1000	–	–	–
Singles	WTA 500	3	–	3
Singles	WTA 250	3	1	4
Singles	Olympics	–	–	–
Singles	Total	6	1	7
Doubles	Grand Slam	–	–	–
Doubles	WTA Finals	–	–	–
Doubles	WTA 1000	2	1	3
Doubles	WTA 500	1	1	2
Doubles	WTA 250	–	–	–
Doubles	Olympics	–	1	1
Doubles	Total	3	3	6

This is a list of career statistics of Russian tennis player Diana Shnaider.

Shnaider has won five singles titles on WTA Tour.

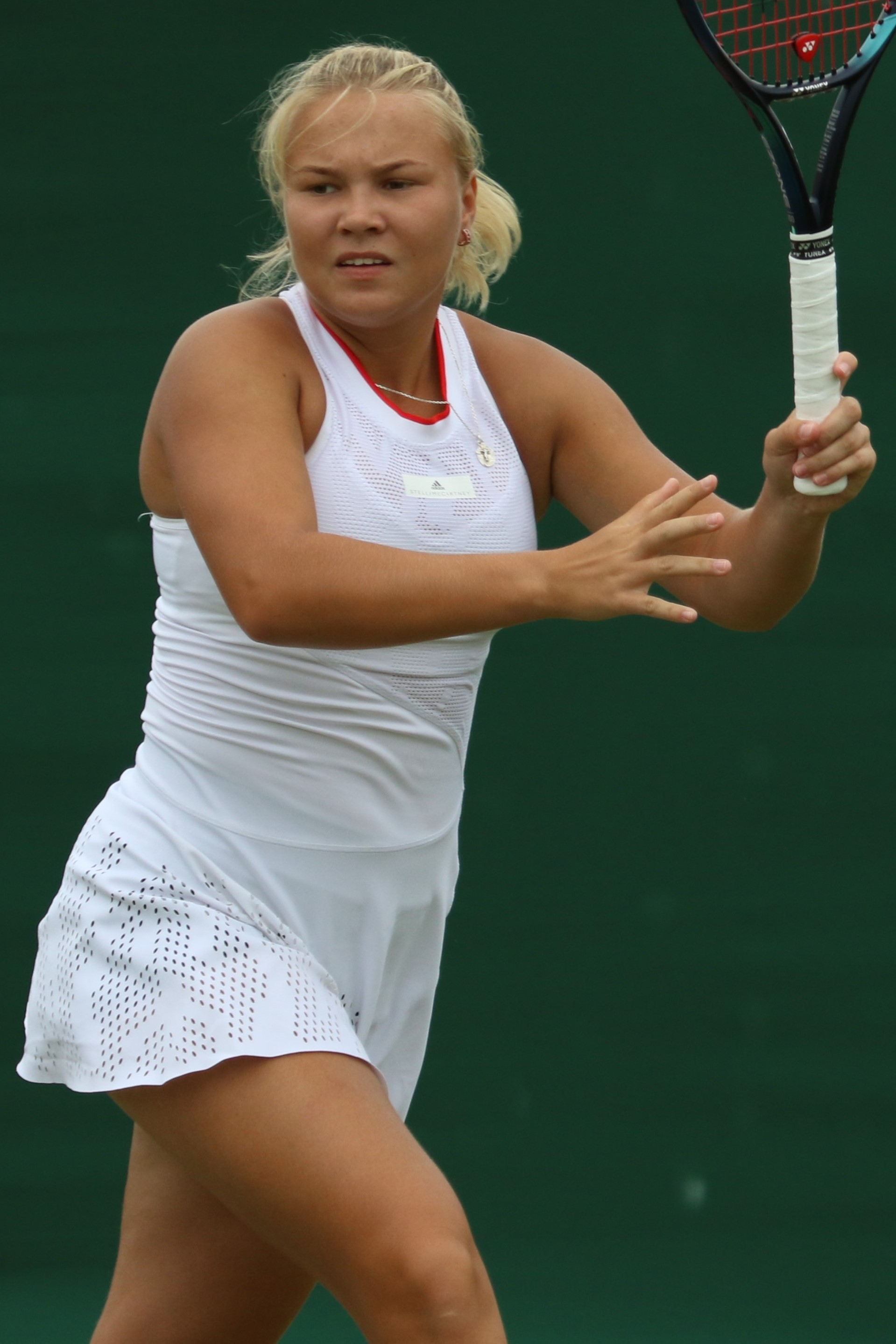
Russian player Diana Shnaider at the 2023 Wimbledon Championships

== Performance timelines ==
Key
W	F	SF	QF	#R	RR	Q#	DNQ	A	NH

(W) winner; (F) finalist; (SF) semifinalist; (QF) quarterfinalist; (#R) rounds 4, 3, 2, 1; (RR) round-robin stage; (Q#) qualification round; (DNQ) did not qualify; (A) absent; (NH) not held; (SR) strike rate (events won / competed); (W–L) win–loss record.
To avoid confusion and double counting, these charts are updated at the conclusion of a tournament or when the player's participation has ended.

Only main-draw results in WTA Tour, Grand Slam tournaments, Billie Jean King Cup, United Cup, Hopman Cup and Olympic Games are included in win–loss records.

=== Singles ===
Current through the 2026 Pan Pacific Open.

Tournament	2023	2024	2025	2026	SR	W–L	Win %
Grand Slam tournaments
Australian Open	2R	1R	3R	3R	0 / 4	5–4	56%
French Open	2R	1R	2R	SF	0 / 4	7–4	64%
Wimbledon	Q2	3R	2R	2R	0 / 3	4–3	57%
US Open	Q2	4R	1R	3R	0 / 3	5–3	63%
Win–Loss	2–2	5–4	4–4	10–4	0 / 14	21–14	60%
Year-end championships
WTA Finals	Did Not Qualify			RR	0 / 1	0–1	0%
National representation
Summer Olympics	NH	2R	Not Held		0 / 1	1–1	50%
WTA 1000 tournaments
Qatar Open	NTI	1R	1R	1R	0 / 3	0–3	0%
Dubai Championships	A	A	2R	2R	0 / 2	2–2	50%
Indian Wells Open	Q1	2R	3R	2R	0 / 3	2–3	40%
Miami Open	Q1	2R	2R	3R	0 / 3	2–3	40%
Madrid Open	A	1R	4R	3R	0 / 3	3–3	50%
Italian Open	A	3R	QF	3R	0 / 3	6–3	67%
Canadian Open	A	SF	2R	QF	0 / 3	7–3	70%
Cincinnati Open	A	3R	2R	4R	0 / 3	4–3	57%
China Open	A	3R	2R	3R	0 / 3	2–3	40%
Wuhan Open	NH	1R	1R	QF	0 / 3	3–3	50%
Win–Loss	0–0	11–9	7–10	13–10	0 / 29	31–29	52%
Career statistics
	2023	2024	2025	2026	SR	W–L	Win %
Tournaments	11	25	26	23	Career total: 85		
Titles	0	4	1	1	Career total: 6		
Finals	1	4	1	1	Career total: 7		
Hard win–loss	9–7	25–13	13–15	28–14	4 / 54	78–50	61%
Clay win–loss	7–4	8–5	8–5	10–5	1 / 20	33–19	63%
Grass win–loss	0–0	9–3	4–4	1–3	1 / 11	14–10	58%
Overall win–loss	16–11	42–21	24–23	39–22	6 / 85	125–79	61%
Year-end ranking (Note: 2021: WTA ranking-1065, 2022: WTA ranking-182.)	60	13	22	11	$7,575,558		

=== Doubles ===
Current through the 2026 China Open.

Tournament	2023	2024	2025	2026	SR	W–L	Win %
Grand Slam tournaments
Australian Open	A	3R	SF	1R	0 / 3	6–3	67%
French Open	A	QF	SF	1R	0 / 3	7–3	70%
Wimbledon	A	2R	3R	1R	0 / 3	3–3	50%
US Open	A	1R	QF	SF	0 / 3	6–3	70%
Win–Loss	0–0	6–4	13–4	3–4	0 / 12	22–12	65%
Year-end championships
WTA Finals	DNQ		RR	DNQ	0 / 1	0–3	0%
National representation
Summer Olympics	NH	S	NH		0 / 1	4–1	80%
WTA 1000 tournaments
Qatar Open	NTI	A	SF	2R	0 / 2	4–2	67%
Dubai Championships	A	A	A	2R	0 / 1	1–1	50%
Indian Wells Open	A	A	1R	1R	0 / 2	0–2	0%
Miami Open	A	A	W	1R	1 / 2	5–1	83%
Madrid Open	A	A	2R	F	0 / 2	5–2	71%
Italian Open	A	A	SF	W	1 / 2	8–1	89%
Canadian Open	A	A	1R	QF	0 / 2	2–2	50%
Cincinnati Open	A	SF	A	1R	0 / 2	3–2	60%
China Open	A	QF	1R	SF	0 / 3	5–3	63%
Wuhan Open	NH	A	2R	A	0 / 1	0–1	0%
Win–Loss	0–0	5–2	12–7	16–8	2 / 19	33–17	66%
Career statistics
	2023	2024	2025	2026	SR	W–L	Win %
Tournaments	5	15	17	15	Career total: 52		
Titles	0	0	2	1	Career total: 3		
Finals	0	1	3	2	Career total: 6		
Hard win–loss	3–4	8–7	19–10	11–10	2 / 31	41–31	57%
Clay win–loss	0–1	8–4	10–4	9–2	1 / 12	27–11	71%
Grass win–loss	0–0	3–4	5–3	0–2	0 / 9	8–9	47%
Overall win–loss	3–5	19–15	34–17	20–14	3 / 52	76–51	60%
Year-end ranking (Note: 2021: WTA ranking-1672, 2022: WTA ranking-288.)	206	50	11				

== Significant finals ==
=== WTA 1000 tournaments ===
==== Doubles: 3 (2 titles, 1 runner-up) ====
Result	Year	Tournament	Surface	Partner	Opponents	Score
Win	2025	Miami Open	Hard	Mirra Andreeva	(Spain) Cristina Bucșa (Japan) Miyu Kato	6–3, 6–7^{(5–7)}, [10–2]
Loss	2026	Madrid Open	Clay	Mirra Andreeva	(Czech Republic) Kateřina Siniaková (United States) Taylor Townsend	6–7^{(2–7)}, 2–6
Win	2026	Italian Open	Clay	Mirra Andreeva	(Spain) Cristina Bucșa (United States) Nicole Melichar-Martinez	6–3, 6–3

=== Summer Olympics ===
==== Doubles: 1 (silver medal) ====
Result	Year	Tournament	Surface	Partner	Opponents	Score
Silver	2024	Paris Olympics	Clay	Mirra Andreeva	(Italy) Sara Errani (Italy) Jasmine Paolini	6–2, 1–6, [7–10]

== WTA Tour finals ==
=== Singles: 7 (6 titles, 1 runner-up) ===
Legend WTA 500 (3–0) WTA 250 (3–1)	Finals by surface Hard (4–1) Clay (1–0) Grass (1–0)	Finals by setting Outdoor (6–1)

Result	W–L	Date	Tournament	Tier	Surface	Opponent	Score
Loss	0–1	Sep 2023	Ningbo Open, China	WTA 250	Hard	(Tunisia) Ons Jabeur	2–6, 1–6
Win	1–1	Feb 2024	Hua Hin Championships, Thailand	WTA 250	Hard	(China) Zhu Lin	6–3, 2–6, 6–1
Win	2–1	Jun 2024	Bad Homburg Open, Germany	WTA 500	Grass	(Croatia) Donna Vekić	6–3, 2–6, 6–3
Win	3–1	Jul 2024	Budapest Grand Prix, Hungary	WTA 250	Clay	Aliaksandra Sasnovich	6–4, 6–4
Win	4–1	Nov 2024	Hong Kong Open, China SAR	WTA 250	Hard	(United Kingdom) Katie Boulter	6–1, 6–2
Win	5–1	Aug 2025	Monterrey Open, Mexico	WTA 500	Hard	Ekaterina Alexandrova	6–3, 4–6, 6–4
Win	6–1	Nov 2026	Pan Pacific Open, Japan	WTA 500	Hard	(Canada) Leylah Fernandez	6–4, 5–7, 6–2

=== Doubles: 6 (3 titles, 3 runner-ups) ===
Legend Olympics (0–1) WTA 1000 (2–1) WTA 500 (1–1)	Finals by surface Hard (2–0) Clay (1–2) Grass (0–1)	Finals by setting Outdoor (3–3)

Result	W–L	Date	Tournament	Tier	Surface	Partner	Opponents	Score
Loss	0–1	Aug 2024	Summer Olympics, Paris	Olympics	Clay	Mirra Andreeva	(Italy) Sara Errani (Italy) Jasmine Paolini	6–2, 1–6, [7–10]
Win	1–1	Jan 2025	Brisbane International, Australia	WTA 500	Hard	Mirra Andreeva	(Australia) Priscilla Hon; Anna Kalinskaya	7–6^{(8–6)}, 7–5
Win	2–1	Mar 2025	Miami Open, US	WTA 1000	Hard	Mirra Andreeva	(Spain) Cristina Bucșa (Japan) Miyu Kato	6–3, 6–7^{(5–7)}, [10–2]
Loss	2–2	Jun 2025	Queen's Club Championships, UK	WTA 500	Grass	(Kazakhstan) Anna Danilina	(United States) Asia Muhammad (Netherlands) Demi Schuurs	5–7, 7–6^{(7–3)}, [4–10]
Loss	2–3	Apr 2026	Madrid Open, Spain	WTA 1000	Clay	Mirra Andreeva	(Czech Republic) Kateřina Siniaková (United States) Taylor Townsend	6–7^{(2–7)}, 2–6
Win	3–3	May 2026	Italian Open, Italy	WTA 1000	Clay	Mirra Andreeva	(Spain) Cristina Bucșa (United States) Nicole Melichar-Martinez	6–3, 6–3

== WTA 125 finals ==
=== Singles: 3 (2 titles, 1 runner-up) ===
Result	W–L	Date	Tournament	Surface	Opponent	Score
Win	1–0	Nov 2022	Montevideo Open, Uruguay	Clay	(France) Léolia Jeanjean	6–4, 6–4
Loss	1–1	Mar 2024	Charleston Pro, US	Hard	(Italy) Elisabetta Cocciaretto	3–6, 2–6
Win	2–1	May 2024	Clarins Open, France	Clay	(United States) Emma Navarro	6–2, 3–6, 6–4

=== Doubles: 1 (title) ===
Result	Date	Tournament	Surface	Partner	Opponents	Score
Win	Jun 2023	Solgironès Open, Spain	Clay	(United States) Caroline Dolehide	(Spain) Aliona Bolsova (Spain) Rebeka Masarova	7–6^{(7–5)}, 6–3

== ITF Circuit finals ==
=== Singles: 5 (4 titles, 1 runner-up) ===
Legend W60 tournaments (1–1) W25 tournaments (1–0) W15 tournaments (2–0)	Finals by surface Hard (0–1) Clay (4–0)

Result	W–L	Date	Tournament	Tier	Surface	Opponent	Score
Win	1–0	Nov 2021	ITF Antalya, Turkey	W15	Clay	(Slovenia) Pia Lovrič	6–3, 6–2
Win	2–0	Apr 2022	Oeiras Open, Portugal	W25	Clay	(Italy) Martina di Giuseppe	6–4, 6–2
Win	3–0	Apr 2022	ITF Shymkent, Kazakhstan	W15	Clay	Ekaterina Maklakova	6–2, 7–5
Win	4–0	May 2022	Edge Istanbul, Turkey	W60	Clay	(Czech Republic) Nikola Bartůňková	7–5, 7–5
Loss	4–1	Oct 2022	Las Vegas Open, US	W60	Hard	(China) Yuan Yue	6–4, 3–6, 1–6

=== Doubles: 4 (3 titles, 1 runner-up) ===
Legend W60 tournaments (1–1) W25 tournaments (1–0) W15 tournaments (1–0)	Finals by surface Clay (3–1)

Result	W–L	Date	Tournament	Tier	Surface	Partner	Opponents	Score
Win	1–0	Nov 2021	ITF Antalya, Turkey	W15	Clay	(Ukraine) Anastasiya Soboleva	(Serbia) Tamara Čurović (Hungary) Amarissa Tóth	6–2, 6–0
Win	2–0	Mar 2022	ITF Antalya, Turkey	W25	Clay	(Hungary) Amarissa Tóth	Amina Anshba; Maria Timofeeva	6–4, 6–2
Win	3–0	Aug 2022	Ladies Open Hechingen, Germany	W60	Clay	Irina Khromacheva	(Serbia) Tamara Čurović (United States) Chiara Scholl	6–2, 6–3
Loss	3–1	Aug 2022	ITF San Bartolomé de Tirajana, Spain	W60	Clay	Elina Avanesyan	(Spain) Ángela Fita Boluda (Netherlands) Arantxa Rus	4–6, 4–6

== Junior Grand Slam finals ==
=== Doubles: 4 (3 titles, 1 runner-up) ===
Result	Year	Tournament	Surface	Partner	Opponents	Score
Loss	2020	French Open	Clay	(Russia) Maria Bondarenko	(Italy) Eleonora Alvisi (Italy) Lisa Pigato	6–7^{(3–7)}, 4–6
Win	2021	Wimbledon	Grass	(Belarus) Kristina Dmitruk	(Belgium) Sofia Costoulas (Finland) Laura Hietaranta	6–1, 6–2
Win	2022	Australian Open	Hard	(United States) Clervie Ngounoue	(Canada) Kayla Cross (Canada) Victoria Mboko	6–4, 6–3
Win	2022	US Open	Hard	(Czech Republic) Lucie Havlíčková	(Germany) Carolina Kuhl (Germany) Ella Seidel	6–3, 6–2

== WTA Tour career earnings ==
Current through the 2026 WTA Finals.

Year	Grand Slam titles	WTA titles	Total titles	Earnings ($)	Money list rank
2021	0	0	0	8,980	610
2022	0	0	0	38,036	367
2023	0	0	0	354,078	139
2024	0	4	4	1,588,227	25
2025	0	3	3	2,148,649	18
2026	0	2	2	3,493,406	12
Career	0	9	9	7,715,558	118

== Wins against top 10 players ==
- Shnaider has a 4–18 (18%) record against players who were, at the time the match was played, ranked in the top 10.

Season	2024	2025	2026	Total
Wins	1	0	3	4

No.	Player	Rk	Event	Surface	Rd	Score	Rk	Years	Ref
1.	(United States) Coco Gauff	2	Canadian Open, Canada	Hard	3R	6–4, 6–1	24	2024	
2.	Aryna Sabalenka	1	French Open, France	Clay	QF	3–6, 7–5, 6–0	23	2026	
3.	(United States) Jessica Pegula	3	Canadian Open, Canada	Hard	4R	6–3, 6–3	17	2026	
4.	(Czech Republic) Karolína Muchová	7	Wuhan Open, China	Hard	3R	7–5, 6–3	13	2026	

- Key: (Rk) first use, opponent rank; (Rd) round; (Rk) 2nd use, player rank; (Ref) reference; (F) final; (SF) semifinal; (QF) quarterfinal; (#R) rounds 4, 3, 2, 1; (RR) round-robin stage; (Q#) qualifying rounds or stages (3), 2, 1.

*As of 2 November 2026
