= 2022 Edge Istanbul =

Tennis tournament

- Date: 25 April–1 May 2022
- Edition: 1st
- Category: ITF Women's World Tennis Tour
- Prize money: $60,000
- Surface: Clay / Outdoor
- Location: Istanbul, Turkey

Champions

Singles
- Diana Shnaider

Doubles
- (Poland) Maja Chwalińska / (Czech Republic) Jesika Malečková
Edge Istanbul	· 2023 →

The 2022 Edge Istanbul was a professional tennis tournament played on outdoor clay courts. It was the first edition of the tournament which was part of the 2022 ITF Women's World Tennis Tour. It took place in Istanbul, Turkey between 25 April and 1 May 2022.

== Singles main draw entrants ==
=== Seeds ===
Country	Player	Rank^{1}	Seed
BUL	Viktoriya Tomova	111	1
ROU	Mihaela Buzărnescu	123	2
JPN	Mai Hontama	131	3
SUI	Susan Bandecchi	170	4
	Anastasia Tikhonova	176	5
	Marina Melnikova	182	6
NED	Suzan Lamens	185	7
USA	Caty McNally	193	8

- ^{1} Rankings are as of 18 April 2022.

=== Other entrants ===
The following players received wildcards into the singles main draw:

- Amina Anshba
- (Turkey) Berfu Cengiz
- (Turkey) Zeynep Sönmez
- (Turkey) İlay Yörük

The following player received entry using a junior exempt:

- Diana Shnaider

The following player received entry as a special exempt:

- (Italy) Camilla Rosatello

The following players received entry from the qualifying draw:

- (Czech Republic) Nikola Bartůňková
- (Poland) Maja Chwalińska
- (Romania) Nicoleta Dascălu
- (Spain) Ángela Fita Boluda
- (Romania) Oana Gavrilă
- (Bulgaria) Lia Karatancheva
- (Romania) Andreea Prisăcariu
- (Serbia) Natalija Stevanović

The following player received entry as a lucky loser:

- (Turkey) Ayla Aksu

== Champions ==
=== Singles ===
- Diana Shnaider def. (Czech Republic) Nikola Bartůňková, 7–5, 7–5

=== Doubles ===
- (Poland) Maja Chwalińska / (Czech Republic) Jesika Malečková def. (Turkey) Berfu Cengiz / Anastasia Tikhonova, 2–6, 6–4, [10–7]
