= 2026 Birmingham Open – Women's doubles =

Women's doubles
- 2026 Birmingham Open

Final
- Champions: (Australia) Talia Gibson (Indonesia) Janice Tjen
- Runners-up: (United Kingdom) Harriet Dart (United Kingdom) Maia Lumsden
- Score: 6–4, 6–3

Events
Singles	men	women
Doubles	men	women
- Birmingham Open

Destanee Aiava and Cristina Bucșa were the reigning champions, but did not participate this year.

Talia Gibson and Janice Tjen won the title, defeating Harriet Dart and Maia Lumsden 6–4, 6–3 in the final.

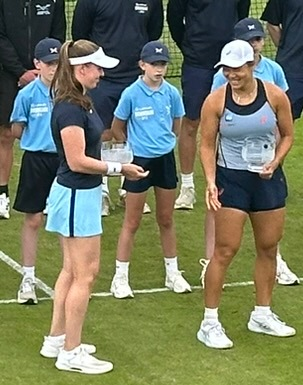
Talia Gibson and Janice Tjen with their trophies

== Seeds ==
1. (Australia) Talia Gibson / (Indonesia) Janice Tjen (champions)
2. (United Kingdom) Harriet Dart / (United Kingdom) Maia Lumsden (final)
3. (United States) Ivana Corley / (Canada) Kayla Cross (first round)
4. (United Kingdom) Madeleine Brooks / (United Kingdom) Amelia Rajecki (first round)

== Draw ==
Key

- Q = Qualifier
- WC = Wild card
- LL = Lucky loser
- Alt = Alternate
- ITF = ITF entry
- PR = Protected ranking
- SR = Special ranking
- SE = Special exempt
- JE = Junior exempt
- JR = Junior Accelerator Programme entrant
- CO = College Accelerator Programme entrant
- NG = Next Gen Accelerator Program entrant
- w/o = Walkover
- r = Retired
- d = Defaulted

=== Draw ===
First round
1	(Australia) T Gibson (Indonesia) J Tjen	6	6
(Thailand) M Sawangkaew (China) Q Tang	3	0
PR	(United Kingdom) A Barnett (United Kingdom) S Murray Sharan	5	4
(Australia) T Preston (United Kingdom) K Swan	7	6
3	(United States) I Corley (Canada) K Cross	5	6^{3}
(Slovakia) V Hrunčáková (Czech Republic) V Valdmannová	7	7^{7}
PR	(Japan) N Hibino (Poland) A Rosolska	2	4
(Belgium) G Minnen (Belgium) H Vandewinkel	6	6
(United States) K Day (United States) M Stoiana	7^{7}	6
A Charaeva (Uzbekistan) K Rakhimova	6^{5}	3
WC	(United Kingdom) J Burrage (United Kingdom) M Stojsavljevic	6	6
4	(United Kingdom) M Brooks (United Kingdom) A Rajecki	4	4
Alt	(Switzerland) C Naef (United Kingdom) E Webley-Smith	6	7^{8}
(Japan) H Kuwata (Netherlands) L Tran	3	6^{6}
(Czech Republic) N Bartůňková (Philippines) A Eala	4	6	[9]
2	(United Kingdom) H Dart (United Kingdom) M Lumsden	6	2	[11]

Quarterfinals
1	(Australia) T Gibson (Indonesia) J Tjen	6	6
(Australia) T Preston (United Kingdom) K Swan	4	2
(Slovakia) V Hrunčáková (Czech Republic) V Valdmannová	1
(Belgium) G Minnen (Belgium) H Vandewinkel	0^{r}
(United States) K Day (United States) M Stoiana	6	6
WC	(United Kingdom) J Burrage (United Kingdom) M Stojsavljevic	3	0
Alt	(Switzerland) C Naef (United Kingdom) E Webley-Smith	1	6	[8]
2	(United Kingdom) H Dart (United Kingdom) M Lumsden	6	3	[10]

Semifinals
1	(Australia) T Gibson (Indonesia) J Tjen	6^{2}	6	[10]
(Slovakia) V Hrunčáková (Czech Republic) V Valdmannová	7^{7}	3	[7]
(United States) K Day (United States) M Stoiana	2	0
2	(United Kingdom) H Dart (United Kingdom) M Lumsden	6	6

Final
1	(Australia) T Gibson (Indonesia) J Tjen	6	6
2	(United Kingdom) H Dart (United Kingdom) M Lumsden	4	3
