= 2025 Samsun Open – Doubles =

Doubles
- 2025 Samsun Open

Final
- Champions: (Switzerland) Naïma Karamoko (France) Tiantsoa Rakotomanga Rajaonah
- Runners-up: (United Kingdom) Harriet Dart (United Kingdom) Maia Lumsden
- Score: 7–5, 1–6, [10–6]

Events
Singles	Doubles
- Samsun Open

Naïma Karamoko and Tiantsoa Rakotomanga Rajaonah won the title, defeating Harriet Dart and Maia Lumsden in the final, 7–5, 1–6, [10–6].

This was the first edition of the tournament.

== Seeds ==
1. (United Kingdom) Harriet Dart / (United Kingdom) Maia Lumsden (final)
2. (United Kingdom) Emily Appleton / (Poland) Weronika Falkowska (quarterfinals)
3. (Slovenia) Dalila Jakupović / (Slovenia) Nika Radišić (semifinals)
4. (United Kingdom) Eden Silva / Anastasia Tikhonova (semifinals)

== Draw ==
Key

- Q = Qualifier
- WC = Wild card
- LL = Lucky loser
- Alt = Alternate
- ITF = ITF entry
- PR = Protected ranking
- SR = Special ranking
- SE = Special exempt
- JE = Junior exempt
- JR = Junior Accelerator Programme entrant
- CO = College Accelerator Programme entrant
- NG = Next Gen Accelerator Program entrant
- w/o = Walkover
- r = Retired
- d = Defaulted

=== Draw ===
First round
1	(United Kingdom) H Dart (United Kingdom) M Lumsden	6	6
(Japan) M Ayukawa; E Yashina	2	0
(Turkey) B Cengiz (Turkey) İ Öz	2	1
(Czech Republic) D Vidmanová; K Zaytseva	6	6
4	(United Kingdom) E Silva; A Tikhonova	6	6
WC	(Turkey) S Atay (Turkey) D Çırpanlı	0	2
(Ukraine) M Kolb (Ukraine) N Kolb	6	1	[5]
(Turkey) A Aksu (Lithuania) J Mikulskytė	3	6	[10]
V Diatchenko (Romania) M Niculescu	7^{7}	6
E Ovcharenko (United Kingdom) E Webley-Smith	6^{1}	2
(Turkey) Ç Büyükakçay (North Macedonia) L Gjorcheska	3	4
3	(Slovenia) D Jakupović (Slovenia) N Radišić	6	6
(Switzerland) N Karamoko (France) T Rakotomanga Rajaonah	6	6
(France) A Hesse (France) H Tan	2	0
(Czech Republic) N Bartůňková; M Timofeeva	5	2
2	(United Kingdom) E Appleton (Poland) W Falkowska	7	6

Quarterfinals
1	(United Kingdom) H Dart (United Kingdom) M Lumsden	6	3	[10]
(Czech Republic) D Vidmanová; K Zaytseva	3	6	[2]
4	(United Kingdom) E Silva; A Tikhonova	6	7
(Turkey) A Aksu (Lithuania) J Mikulskytė	1	5
V Diatchenko (Romania) M Niculescu	5	7^{7}	[9]
3	(Slovenia) D Jakupović (Slovenia) N Radišić	7	6^{4}	[11]
(Switzerland) N Karamoko (France) T Rakotomanga Rajaonah	3	7^{7}	[10]
2	(United Kingdom) E Appleton (Poland) W Falkowska	6	6^{5}	[6]

Semifinals
1	(United Kingdom) H Dart (United Kingdom) M Lumsden	6	6
4	(United Kingdom) E Silva; A Tikhonova	4	4
3	(Slovenia) D Jakupović (Slovenia) N Radišić	3	5
(Switzerland) N Karamoko (France) T Rakotomanga Rajaonah	6	7

Final
1	(United Kingdom) H Dart (United Kingdom) M Lumsden	5	6	[6]
(Switzerland) N Karamoko (France) T Rakotomanga Rajaonah	7	1	[10]
