= 2023 Edge Istanbul =

Tennis tournament

- Date: 24–30 April 2023
- Edition: 2nd
- Category: ITF Women's World Tennis Tour
- Prize money: $60,000
- Surface: Clay / Outdoor
- Location: Istanbul, Turkey

Champions

Singles
- (Romania) Irina Bara

Doubles
- (Slovenia) Dalila Jakupović / Irina Khromacheva
← 2022 ·	Edge Istanbul	· 2024 →

The 2023 Edge Istanbul was a professional tennis tournament played on outdoor clay courts. It was the second edition of the tournament, which was part of the 2023 ITF Women's World Tennis Tour. It took place in Istanbul, Turkey, between 24 and 30 April 2023.

== Champions ==
=== Singles ===
- (Romania) Irina Bara def. (Turkey) Berfu Cengiz, 6–7^{(2–7)}, 6–4, 6–1

=== Doubles ===
- (Slovenia) Dalila Jakupović / Irina Khromacheva def. (Australia) Priscilla Hon / (Ukraine) Valeriya Strakhova, 7–6^{(7–3)}, 6–4

== Singles main draw entrants ==
=== Seeds ===
Country	Player	Rank	Seed
GBR	Katie Swan	149	1
CZE	Sára Bejlek	159	2
AUS	Priscilla Hon	163	3
AUS	Jaimee Fourlis	176	4
	Darya Astakhova	185	5
	Ekaterina Makarova	202	6
SLO	Dalila Jakupović	209	7
MKD	Lina Gjorcheska	214	8

- Rankings are as of 17 April 2023.

=== Other entrants ===
The following players received wildcards into the singles main draw:

- (Turkey) Ayla Aksu
- (Turkey) Başak Eraydın
- (Turkey) Ayşegül Mert
- (Turkey) İlay Yörük

The following players received entry from the qualifying draw:

- (Bulgaria) Denislava Glushkova
- Alina Korneeva
- Daria Lodikova
- Ekaterina Maklakova
- (Greece) Martha Matoula
- (Estonia) Maileen Nuudi
- (Netherlands) Lexie Stevens
- (Ukraine) Valeriya Strakhova

The following player received entry as a lucky loser:

- (Romania) Maria Sara Popa
