= 2026 Birmingham Open – Men's singles =

Men's singles
- 2026 Birmingham Open

Final
- Champion: (China) Bu Yunchaokete
- Runner-up: (Finland) Otto Virtanen
- Score: 2–6, 7–6^{(7–3)}, 6–3

Events
Singles	men	women
Doubles	men	women
- Birmingham Open

Otto Virtanen was the defending champion but lost in the final to Bu Yunchaokete.

Bu won the title after defeating Virtanen 2–6, 7–6^{(7–3)}, 6–3 in the final.

== Seeds ==
1. (Italy) Mattia Bellucci (first round)
2. (Poland) Kamil Majchrzak (semifinals)
3. (Australia) James Duckworth (withdrew)
4. (Australia) Aleksandar Vukic (second round, withdrew)
5. (Australia) Rinky Hijikata (quarterfinals)
6. (Japan) Sho Shimabukuro (quarterfinals)
7. (Hong Kong) Coleman Wong (second round)
8. (Switzerland) Leandro Riedi (first round)

== Draw ==
Key

- Q = Qualifier
- WC = Wild card
- LL = Lucky loser
- Alt = Alternate
- ITF = ITF entry
- PR = Protected ranking
- SR = Special ranking
- SE = Special exempt
- JE = Junior exempt
- JR = Junior Accelerator Programme entrant
- CO = College Accelerator Programme entrant
- NG = Next Gen Accelerator Program entrant
- w/o = Walkover
- r = Retired
- d = Defaulted

=== Finals ===
Semifinals
(United Kingdom) Arthur Fery	2	6	3
(China) Bu Yunchaokete	6	3	6
(Finland) Otto Virtanen	7^{8}	6^{5}	7^{9}
2	(Poland) Kamil Majchrzak	6^{6}	7^{7}	6^{7}

Final
(China) Bu Yunchaokete	2	7^{7}	6
(Finland) Otto Virtanen	6	6^{3}	3

=== Top half ===
First round
1	(Italy) M Bellucci	3	0
(Australia) A Bolt	6	6
(Australia) T Schoolkate	4	6	3
(United Kingdom) A Fery	6	3	6
(United States) M McDonald	6	7^{7}
(Norway) N Budkov Kjær	3	6^{3}
(United Kingdom) J Fearnley	1	6^{3}
5	(Australia) R Hijikata	6	7^{7}
LL	(United States) M Damm	6	6^{3}	6^{3}
(United Kingdom) B Harris	2	7^{7}	7^{7}
(China) Y Bu	7^{7}	1	6
(South Africa) L Harris	6^{5}	6	1
Q	(New Zealand) J Watt	4	7^{7}	6^{3}
WC	(United Kingdom) H Wendelken	6	6^{5}	7^{7}
Alt	(Estonia) M Lajal	6	7^{7}
8	(Switzerland) L Riedi	2	6^{1}

Second round
(Australia) A Bolt	4	7^{7}	3
(United Kingdom) A Fery	6	6^{5}	6
(United States) M McDonald	3	6^{5}
5	(Australia) R Hijikata	6	7^{7}
(United Kingdom) B Harris	2	4
(China) Y Bu	6	6
WC	(United Kingdom) H Wendelken	4	1
Alt	(Estonia) M Lajal	6	6

Quarterfinals
(United Kingdom) A Fery	7^{9}	6
5	(Australia) R Hijikata	6^{7}	3
(China) Y Bu	7	6
Alt	(Estonia) M Lajal	5	4

Semifinals
(United Kingdom) A Fery	2	6	3
(China) Y Bu	6	3	6

=== Bottom half ===
First round
7	(Hong Kong) C Wong	7^{7}	7^{12}
WC	(United Kingdom) O Tarvet	6^{5}	6^{10}
Q	(France) C Chidekh	6	4	4
Q	(Italy) F Romano	3	6	6
Q	(China) Z Zhang	6^{8}	1
(Finland) O Virtanen	7^{10}	6
(United Kingdom) J Pinnington Jones	6	4	3
4	(Australia) A Vukic	2	6	6
6	(Japan) S Shimabukuro	7^{7}	6
(Japan) S Mochizuki	6^{3}	4
Q	(Sweden) E Ymer	7^{9}	6
(Australia) C O'Connell	6^{7}	3
Alt	(France) U Blanchet	7^{7}	6^{2}	4
WC	(United Kingdom) F Gill	6^{5}	7^{7}	6
Q	(Australia) J McCabe	6^{3}	3
2	(Poland) K Majchrzak	7^{7}	6

Second round
7	(Hong Kong) C Wong	4	5
Q	(Italy) F Romano	6	7
(Finland) O Virtanen	w/o
4	(Australia) A Vukic
6	(Japan) S Shimabukuro	6	6
Q	(Sweden) E Ymer	3	3
WC	(United Kingdom) F Gill	3	3
2	(Poland) K Majchrzak	6	6

Quarterfinals
Q	(Italy) F Romano	4	4
(Finland) O Virtanen	6	6
6	(Japan) S Shimabukuro	6^{6}	3
2	(Poland) K Majchrzak	7^{8}	6

Semifinals
(Finland) O Virtanen	7^{8}	6^{5}	7^{9}
2	(Poland) K Majchrzak	6^{6}	7^{7}	6^{7}
