= 2023 Edge Istanbul – Doubles =

Doubles
- 2023 Edge Istanbul

Final
- Champions: (Slovenia) Dalila Jakupović; Irina Khromacheva
- Runners-up: (Australia) Priscilla Hon (Ukraine) Valeriya Strakhova
- Score: 7–6^{(7–3)}, 6–4

Events
Singles	Doubles
← 2022 ·	Edge Istanbul	· 2024 →

Maja Chwalińska and Jesika Malečková were the defending champions but chose not to participate.

Dalila Jakupović and Irina Khromacheva won the title, defeating Priscilla Hon and Valeriya Strakhova in the final, 7–6^{(7–3)}, 6–4.

== Seeds ==
1. (Slovenia) Dalila Jakupović / Irina Khromacheva (champions)
2. (Australia) Priscilla Hon / (Ukraine) Valeriya Strakhova (final)
3. (Croatia) Mariana Dražić / Ekaterina Makarova (semifinals)
4. (Romania) Cristina Dinu / (Australia) Jaimee Fourlis (semifinals)

== Draw ==
=== Key ===
- Q = Qualifier
- WC = Wild card
- LL = Lucky loser
- Alt = Alternate
- SE = Special exempt
- PR = Protected ranking
- ITF = ITF entry
- JE = Junior exempt
- w/o = Walkover
- r = Retired
- d = Defaulted
- SR = Special ranking

First round
A Korneeva; S Lansere	6	4	[7]
(Romania) MS Popa (Turkey) M Sezer	4	6	[10]
(Turkey) Z Balkan (Slovakia) D Maščeníková	2	0
E Maklakova; A Pospelova	6	6
(Turkey) A Aksu (Turkey) B Eraydın	6	6
(Bulgaria) D Glushkova (Bulgaria) G Mihaylova	4	4
(Turkey) LN Elmas (Turkey) Z Sönmez	5	3
(Netherlands) L Stevens; A Zolotareva	7	6

Quarterfinals
1	(Slovenia) D Jakupović; I Khromacheva	6	6
(Romania) MS Popa (Turkey) M Sezer	0	4
4	(Romania) C Dinu (Australia) J Fourlis	6	6
E Maklakova; A Pospelova	3	2
(Turkey) A Aksu (Turkey) B Eraydın	4	2
3	(Croatia) M Dražić; E Makarova	6	6
(Netherlands) L Stevens; A Zolotareva	4	1
2	(Australia) P Hon (Ukraine) V Strakhova	6	6

Semifinals
1	(Slovenia) D Jakupović; I Khromacheva	4	7^{7}	[10]
4	(Romania) C Dinu (Australia) J Fourlis	6	6^{3}	[6]
3	(Croatia) M Dražić; E Makarova	6	2	[7]
2	(Australia) P Hon (Ukraine) V Strakhova	4	6	[10]

Final
1	(Slovenia) D Jakupović; I Khromacheva	7^{7}	6
2	(Australia) P Hon (Ukraine) V Strakhova	6^{3}	4
