= 2026 Birmingham Open =

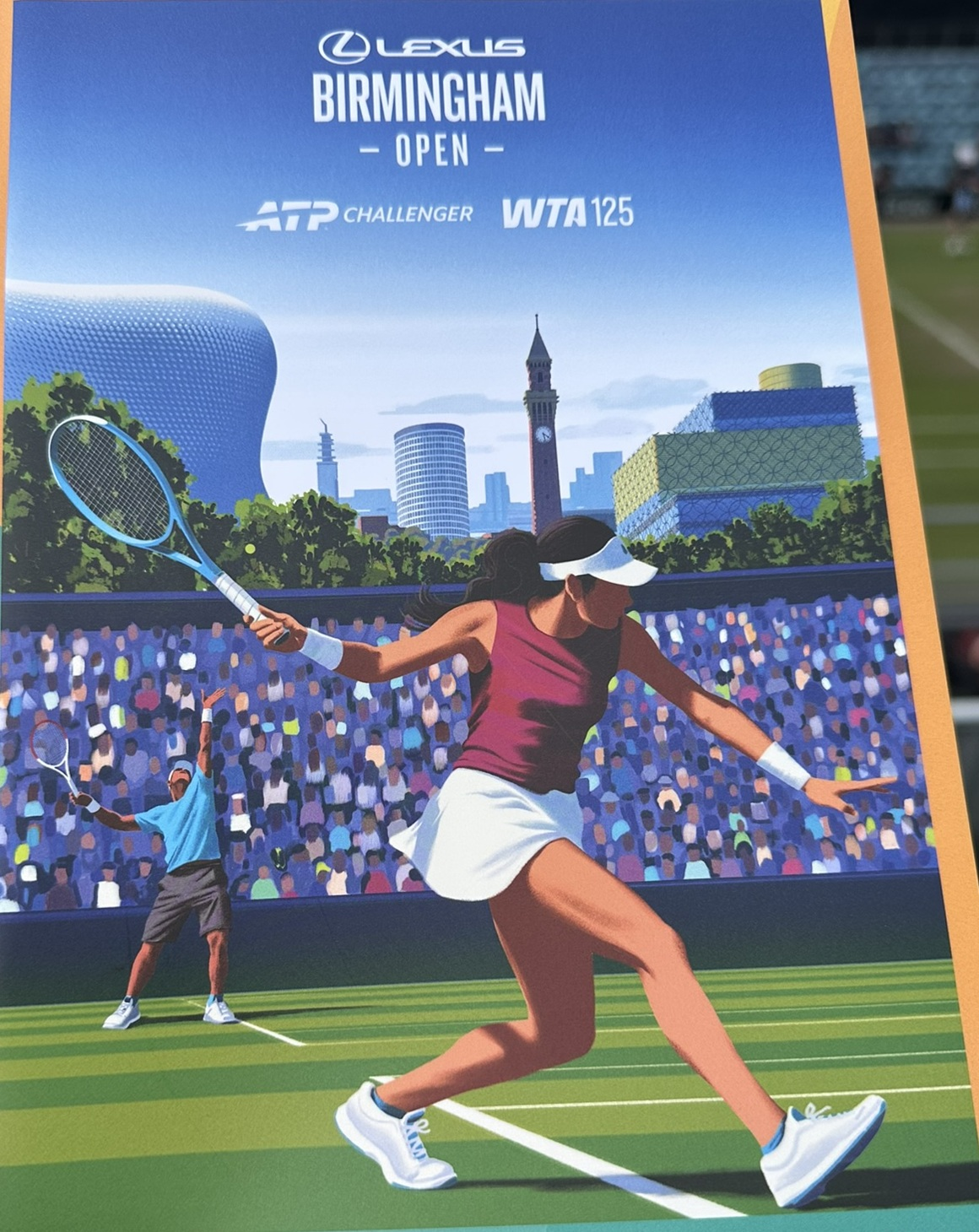
- Date: 1–7 June
- Edition: 2nd (men); 44th (women)
- Category: ATP Challenger Tour 125; WTA 125
- Draw: 32S / 16D
- Prize money: $225,000
- Surface: Grass
- Location: Birmingham, United Kingdom
- Venue: Edgbaston Priory Club

Champions

Men's singles
- (China) Bu Yunchaokete

Women's singles
- (Philippines) Alexandra Eala

Men's doubles
- (United Kingdom) Ben Jones / (United Kingdom) Joshua Paris

Women's doubles
- (Australia) Talia Gibson / (Indonesia) Janice Tjen
- Birmingham Classic

The 2026 Lexus Birmingham Open was a tennis tournament that was played on outdoor grass courts. It was the second edition of the men's event and the 44th edition of the women's event. The tournament was classified as a 2026 ATP Challenger 125 tournament and a 2026 WTA 125 tournament. It took place at the Edgbaston Priory Club in Birmingham, United Kingdom, and was held from 1 to 7 June 2026.

== ATP singles main-draw entrants ==
=== Seeds ===
Country	Player	Rank^{1}	Seed
ITA	Mattia Bellucci	73	1
POL	Kamil Majchrzak	78	2
~~AUS~~	~~James Duckworth~~	~~82~~	~~3~~
AUS	Aleksandar Vukic	96	4
AUS	Rinky Hijikata	98	5
JPN	Sho Shimabukuro	103	6
HKG	Coleman Wong	109	7
SUI	Leandro Riedi	120	8

- ^{1} Rankings are as of 25 May 2026.

=== Other entrants ===
The following players received wildcards into the singles main draw:

- (United Kingdom) Felix Gill
- (United Kingdom) Oliver Tarvet
- (United Kingdom) Harry Wendelken

The following players received entry into the singles main draw as alternates:

- (France) Ugo Blanchet
- (Estonia) Mark Lajal

The following players received entry from the qualifying draw:

- (France) Clément Chidekh
- (Australia) James McCabe
- (Italy) Filippo Romano
- (New Zealand) James Watt
- (Sweden) Elias Ymer
- (China) Zhang Zhizhen

The following player received entry as a lucky loser:

- (United States) Martin Damm

== WTA singles main draw entrants ==
=== Seeds ===
Country	Player	Rank^{1}	Seed
PHI	Alexandra Eala	37	1
INA	Janice Tjen	40	2
GER	Tatjana Maria	54	3
AUS	Talia Gibson	58	4
CZE	Nikola Bartůňková	69	5
BEL	Hanne Vandewinkel	99	6
AUS	Ajla Tomljanović	100	7
NZL	Lulu Sun	109	8

- ^{1} Rankings are as of 25 May 2026.

=== Other entrants ===
The following players received wildcards into the main draw:

- (United Kingdom) Harriet Dart
- (United Kingdom) Alicia Dudeney
- (United Kingdom) Mika Stojsavljevic
- (United Kingdom) Katie Swan

The following players received entry from the qualifying draw:

- (Japan) Nao Hibino
- (United States) Ashlyn Krueger
- (Czech Republic) Tereza Martincová
- (Switzerland) Rebeka Masarova
- (Belgium) Greet Minnen
- (Thailand) Mananchaya Sawangkaew

The following players received entry as lucky losers:

- (Czech Republic) Gabriela Knutson
- (Switzerland) Céline Naef

=== Withdrawals ===
Before the tournament

- (Australia) Kimberly Birrell → replaced by (Australia) Priscilla Hon
- (Switzerland) Viktorija Golubic → replaced by (Switzerland) Céline Naef (LL)
- (Brazil) Beatriz Haddad Maia → replaced by (Australia) Emerson Jones
- (Slovenia) Kaja Juvan → replaced by (United States) Elvina Kalieva
- Alina Korneeva → replaced by (Japan) Himeno Sakatsume
- (Uzbekistan) Polina Kudermetova → replaced by (Czech Republic) Gabriela Knutson (LL)
- (United States) Caty McNally → replaced by (United States) Kayla Day
- (United States) Alycia Parks → replaced by (United States) Mary Stoiana
- (Croatia) Antonia Ružić → replaced by (Czech Republic) Linda Fruhvirtová
- (Ukraine) Daria Snigur → replaced by (Australia) Taylah Preston
- (Thailand) Lanlana Tararudee → replaced by (Australia) Maddison Inglis
- (Czech Republic) Darja Vidmanova → replaced by (Canada) Marina Stakusic
- (China) Zhang Shuai → replaced by (Chinese Taipei) Joanna Garland

=== Retirement ===
- (Australia) Ajla Tomljanović (injury)

== WTA doubles main draw entrants ==
=== Seeds ===
Country	Player	Country	Player	Rank^{1}	Seed
AUS	Talia Gibson	INA	Janice Tjen	170	1
GBR	Harriet Dart	GBR	Maia Lumsden	173	2
USA	Ivana Corley	CAN	Kayla Cross	229	3
GBR	Madeleine Brooks	GBR	Amelia Rajecki	270	4

- ^{1} Rankings are as of 25 May 2026.

=== Other entrants ===
The following pair received a wildcard into the doubles main draw:

- (United Kingdom) Jodie Burrage / (United Kingdom) Mika Stojsavljevic

=== Withdrawals ===
Before the tournament

- (Australia) Priscilla Hon / (Switzerland) Rebeka Masarova → replaced by (Switzerland) Céline Naef / (United Kingdom) Emily Webley-Smith

=== Retirements ===
- (Belgium) Greet Minnen / (Belgium) Hanne Vandewinkel

== Champions ==
=== Men's singles ===
- (China) Bu Yunchaokete def. (Finland) Otto Virtanen 2–6, 7–6^{(7–3)}, 6–3.

=== Women's singles ===
- (Philippines) Alexandra Eala def (Czech Republic) Nikola Bartůňková 5–7, 6–3, 7–5

=== Men's doubles ===
- (United Kingdom) Ben Jones / (United Kingdom) Joshua Paris def. (India) Anirudh Chandrasekar / (Japan) Takeru Yuzuki 6–4, 7–6^{(7–4)}.

=== Women's doubles ===
- (Australia) Talia Gibson / (Indonesia) Janice Tjen def. (United Kingdom) Harriet Dart / (United Kingdom) Maia Lumsden 6–4, 6–3
