= 2025 Samsun Open =

Tennis tournament

- Date: 29 September–5 October 2025
- Edition: 1st
- Category: WTA 125
- Prize money: $115,000
- Surface: Hard
- Location: Samsun, Turkey

Champions

Singles
- (Slovenia) Kaja Juvan

Doubles
- (Switzerland) Naïma Karamoko / (France) Tiantsoa Rakotomanga Rajaonah
- Samsun Open

The 2025 Samsun Open was a professional tennis tournament played on outdoor hard courts. It was the first edition of the tournament and part of the 2025 WTA 125 tournaments. It took place in Samsun, Turkey between 29 September and 5 October 2025.

== Singles main-draw entrants ==
=== Seeds ===
Country	Player	Rank^{1}	Seed
FRA	Tiantsoa Rakotomanga Rajaonah	127	1
SLO	Kaja Juvan	128	2
CZE	Nikola Bartůňková	144	3
ITA	Lucrezia Stefanini	149	4
CZE	Darja Vidmanová	150	5
ESP	Kaitlin Quevedo	156	6
	Maria Timofeeva	161	7
BEL	Sofia Costoulas	165	8

- ^{1} Rankings are as of 22 September 2025.

=== Other entrants ===
The following players received wildcards into the singles main draw:

- (Turkey) Berfu Cengiz
- (Turkey) Defne Çırpanlı
- (Czech Republic) Karolína Plíšková
- (Italy) Lucrezia Stefanini

The following players received entry from the qualifying draw:

- (Poland) Weronika Falkowska
- (United States) Carol Young Suh Lee
- Elina Nepliy
- (Bulgaria) Isabella Shinikova

== Doubles entrants ==
=== Seeds ===
Country	Player	Country	Player	Rank	Seed
GBR	Harriet Dart	GBR	Maia Lumsden	203	1
GBR	Emily Appleton	POL	Weronika Falkowska	240	2
SLO	Dalila Jakupović	SLO	Nika Radišić	319	3
GBR	Eden Silva		Anastasia Tikhonova	333	4

- Rankings as of 22 September 2025.

=== Other entrants ===
The following pair received a wildcard into the doubles main draw:

- (Turkey) Selina Atay / (Turkey) Defne Çırpanlı

== Champions ==
=== Singles ===
- (Slovenia) Kaja Juvan def. (Czech Republic) Nikola Bartůňková, 7–6^{(10–8)}, 6–3

=== Doubles ===
- (Switzerland) Naïma Karamoko / (France) Tiantsoa Rakotomanga Rajaonah def. (United Kingdom) Harriet Dart / (United Kingdom) Maia Lumsden, 7–5, 1–6, [10–6]
