= 2022 Edge Istanbul – Doubles =

Doubles
- 2022 Edge Istanbul

Final
- Champions: (Poland) Maja Chwalińska (Czech Republic) Jesika Malečková
- Runners-up: (Turkey) Berfu Cengiz; Anastasia Tikhonova
- Score: 2–6, 6–4, [10–7]

Events
Singles	Doubles
Edge Istanbul	· 2023 →

This was the first edition of the tournament.

Maja Chwalińska and Jesika Malečková won the title, defeating Berfu Cengiz and Anastasia Tikhonova in the final, 2–6, 6–4, [10–7].

== Seeds ==
1. (Spain) Aliona Bolsova / (United States) Ingrid Neel (quarterfinals)
2. (Thailand) Peangtarn Plipuech / (Indonesia) Jessy Rompies (first round)
3. (Switzerland) Susan Bandecchi / (Serbia) Natalija Stevanović (quarterfinals)
4. Angelina Gabueva / Anastasia Zakharova (quarterfinals)

== Draw ==
=== Key ===
- Q = Qualifier
- WC = Wild card
- LL = Lucky loser
- Alt = Alternate
- SE = Special exempt
- PR = Protected ranking
- ITF = ITF entry
- JE = Junior exempt
- w/o = Walkover
- r = Retired
- d = Defaulted
- SR = Special ranking

=== Draw ===
First round
1	(Spain) A Bolsova (United States) I Neel	6	6
(United Kingdom) Y Miyazaki (India) P Thombare	1	3
(Turkey) B Cengiz; A Tikhonova	6	6
WC	(Turkey) D Türkmen (Turkey) İ Yörük	0	2
3	(Switzerland) S Bandecchi (Serbia) N Stevanović	6	4	[12]
(Indonesia) B Gumulya (Japan) M Hontama	2	6	[10]
(Romania) C Dinu (Romania) A Roșca	6	6
WC	A Anshba; K Dmitruk	2	2
(Israel) L Glushko (United Kingdom) K Swan	2	1
(Poland) M Chwalińska (Czech Republic) J Malečková	6	6
(Romania) M Buzărnescu (Romania) A Prisăcariu	4	4
4	A Gabueva; A Zakharova	6	6
(Belgium) Y Bonaventure (Bulgaria) I Shinikova	7	6
WC	(Turkey) M Sezer (Turkey) Z Sönmez	5	3
(Netherlands) S Lamens; M Melnikova	5	6	[10]
2	(Thailand) P Plipuech (Indonesia) J Rompies	7	2	[5]

Quarterfinals
1	(Spain) A Bolsova (United States) I Neel	6^{5}	6	[12]
(Turkey) B Cengiz; A Tikhonova	7^{7}	1	[14]
3	(Switzerland) S Bandecchi (Serbia) N Stevanović	5	5
(Romania) C Dinu (Romania) A Roșca	7	7
(Poland) M Chwalińska (Czech Republic) J Malečková	5	6	[10]
4	A Gabueva; A Zakharova	7	4	[6]
(Belgium) Y Bonaventure (Bulgaria) I Shinikova	2	2
(Netherlands) S Lamens; M Melnikova	6	6

Semifinals
(Turkey) B Cengiz; A Tikhonova	6	4	[10]
(Romania) C Dinu (Romania) A Roșca	3	6	[7]
(Poland) M Chwalińska (Czech Republic) J Malečková	6	2	[12]
(Netherlands) S Lamens; M Melnikova	3	6	[10]

Final
(Turkey) B Cengiz; A Tikhonova	6	4	[7]
(Poland) M Chwalińska (Czech Republic) J Malečková	2	6	[10]
