= 2026 Birmingham Open – Women's singles =

Women's singles
- 2026 Birmingham Open

Final
- Champion: (Philippines) Alexandra Eala
- Runner-up: (Czech Republic) Nikola Bartůňková
- Score: 5–7, 6–3, 7–5

Details
- Draw: 32 (6Q / 4WC)
- Seeds: 8

Events
| Singles | men | women |
| Doubles | men | women |
- Birmingham Open

Greet Minnen was the defending champion, but lost in the first round to Alina Charaeva.

Alexandra Eala won the title, defeating Nikola Bartůňková 5–7, 6–3, 7–5 in the final.

== Seeds ==
1. (Philippines) Alexandra Eala (champion)
2. (Indonesia) Janice Tjen (second round)
3. (Germany) Tatjana Maria (second round)
4. (Australia) Talia Gibson (first round)
5. (Czech Republic) Nikola Bartůňková (final)
6. (Belgium) Hanne Vandewinkel (first round)
7. (Australia) Ajla Tomljanović (first round, retired)
8. (New Zealand) Lulu Sun (first round)

== Draw ==
Key

- Q = Qualifier
- WC = Wild card
- LL = Lucky loser
- Alt = Alternate
- ITF = ITF entry
- PR = Protected ranking
- SR = Special ranking
- SE = Special exempt
- JE = Junior exempt
- JR = Junior Accelerator Programme entrant
- CO = College Accelerator Programme entrant
- NG = Next Gen Accelerator Program entrant
- w/o = Walkover
- r = Retired
- d = Defaulted

=== Finals ===
Semifinals
1 | (Philippines) Alexandra Eala | 6 | 4 | 6
Q | (Switzerland) Rebeka Masarova | 2 | 6 | 3
5 | (Czech Republic) Nikola Bartůňková | 6 | 7^{9}
Q | (United States) Ashlyn Krueger | 4 | 6^{7}

Final
1 | (Philippines) Alexandra Eala | 5 | 6 | 7
5 | (Czech Republic) Nikola Bartůňková | 7 | 3 | 5

=== Top half ===
First round
1 | (Philippines) A Eala | 6 | 6
(Australia) P Hon | 0 | 2
Q | (Belgium) G Minnen | 3 | 1
A Charaeva | 6 | 6
Q | (Thailand) M Sawangkaew | 6 | 7
(Poland) L Klimovičová | 4 | 5
(United States) K Day | 7^{7} | 6
6 | (Belgium) H Vandewinkel | 6^{2} | 2
3 | (Germany) T Maria | 6 | 6
(Czech Republic) L Fruhvirtová | 0 | 1
Q | (Switzerland) R Masarova | 6^{6} | 6 | 6
Q | (Czech Republic) T Martincová | 7^{8} | 1 | 1
LL | (Switzerland) C Naef | 6 | 6
(Australia) M Inglis | 2 | 3
(United States) M Stoiana | 4 | 7^{10} | 6
8 | (New Zealand) L Sun | 6 | 6^{8} | 2

Second round
1 | (Philippines) A Eala | 6 | 7
A Charaeva | 2 | 5
Q | (Thailand) M Sawangkaew | 6 | 6
(United States) K Day | 4 | 1
3 | (Germany) T Maria | 4 | 3
Q | (Switzerland) R Masarova | 6 | 6
LL | (Switzerland) C Naef | 5 | 6 | 6^{5}
(United States) M Stoiana | 7 | 2 | 7^{7}

Quarterfinals
1 | (Philippines) A Eala | 6 | 6
Q | (Thailand) M Sawangkaew | 3 | 2
Q | (Switzerland) R Masarova | 6 | 3 | 6
(United States) M Stoiana | 4 | 6 | 0

Semifinals
1 | (Philippines) A Eala | 6 | 4 | 6
Q | (Switzerland) R Masarova | 2 | 6 | 3

=== Bottom half ===
First round
5 | (Czech Republic) N Bartůňková | 3 | 6 | 7
WC | (United Kingdom) H Dart | 6 | 3 | 5
LL | (Czech Republic) G Knutson | 7^{8} | 6
(Chinese Taipei) J Garland | 6^{6} | 3
WC | (United Kingdom) M Stojsavljevic | 3 | 6 | 7
(Australia) E Jones | 6 | 1 | 5
(United States) E Kalieva | 7 | 2 | 6
4 | (Australia) T Gibson | 5 | 6 | 4
7 | (Australia) A Tomljanović | 6^{4} | 2^{r}
WC | (United Kingdom) K Swan | 7^{7} | 3
(Australia) T Preston | 6 | 6^{4} | 6
WC | (United Kingdom) A Dudeney | 4 | 7^{7} | 3
Q | (United States) A Krueger | 6 | 6
(Japan) H Sakatsume | 4 | 3
Q | (Japan) N Hibino | 4 | 6 | 2
2 | (Indonesia) J Tjen | 6 | 3 | 6

Second round
5 | (Czech Republic) N Bartůňková | 6 | 7^{7}
LL | (Czech Republic) G Knutson | 4 | 6^{4}
WC | (United Kingdom) M Stojsavljevic | 6 | 6^{2} | 6
(United States) E Kalieva | 4 | 7^{7} | 2
WC | (United Kingdom) K Swan | 4 | 2
(Australia) T Preston | 6 | 6
Q | (United States) A Krueger | 6 | 6
2 | (Indonesia) J Tjen | 1 | 3

Quarterfinals
5 | (Czech Republic) N Bartůňková | 6 | 6^{8} | 7^{7}
WC | (United Kingdom) M Stojsavljevic | 4 | 7^{8} | 6^{4}
(Australia) T Preston | 6 | 3 | 4
Q | (United States) A Krueger | 2 | 6 | 6

Semifinals
5 | (Czech Republic) N Bartůňková | 6 | 7^{9}
Q | (United States) A Krueger | 4 | 6^{7}

== Qualifying ==
=== Seeds ===
1. (United States) Ashlyn Krueger (qualified)
2. (Switzerland) Rebeka Masarova (qualified)
3. (Poland) Linda Klimovičová (moved to main draw)
4. (Belgium) Greet Minnen (qualified)
5. (Thailand) Mananchaya Sawangkaew (qualified)
6. (Japan) Nao Hibino (qualified)
7. (Canada) Kayla Cross (first round)
8. (Czech Republic) Vendula Valdmannová (qualifying competition)
9. (Czech Republic) Gabriela Knutson (qualifying competition, lucky loser)
10. (Switzerland) Céline Naef (qualifying competition, lucky loser)
11. (Slovakia) Viktória Hrunčáková (qualifying competition)
12. (Japan) Aoi Ito (qualifying competition)

=== Qualifiers ===
1. (United States) Ashlyn Krueger
2. (Switzerland) Rebeka Masarova
3. (Czech Republic) Tereza Martincová
4. (Belgium) Greet Minnen
5. (Thailand) Mananchaya Sawangkaew
6. (Japan) Nao Hibino

=== Lucky losers ===
1. (Switzerland) Céline Naef
2. (Czech Republic) Gabriela Knutson

=== Qualifying draw ===
==== First qualifier ====
First round
1 | (United States) Ashlyn Krueger | 6 | 6
WC | (United Kingdom) Hannah Klugman | 1 | 2
(Netherlands) Anouck Vrancken Peeters | 6 | 4 | 2
9 | (Czech Republic) Gabriela Knutson | 4 | 6 | 6

Qualifying competition
1 | (United States) Ashlyn Krueger | 6 | 7^{7}
9 | (Czech Republic) Gabriela Knutson | 4 | 6^{5}

==== Second qualifier ====
First round
2 | (Switzerland) Rebeka Masarova | 6 | 6
WC | (United Kingdom) Emily Appleton | 2 | 3
(Canada) Carol Zhao | 4 | 3
10 | (Switzerland) Céline Naef | 6 | 6

Qualifying competition
2 | (Switzerland) Rebeka Masarova | 4 | 6 | 6
10 | (Switzerland) Céline Naef | 6 | 4 | 0

==== Third qualifier ====
First round
Alt | (United Kingdom) Victoria Allen | 1 | 4
(Czech Republic) Tereza Martincová | 6 | 6
(United Kingdom) Mimi Xu | 6 | 5 | 6
7 | (Canada) Kayla Cross | 3 | 7 | 0

Qualifying competition
(Czech Republic) Tereza Martincová | 7^{7} | 6
(United Kingdom) Mimi Xu | 6^{2} | 1

==== Fourth qualifier ====
First round
4 | (Belgium) Greet Minnen | 7^{7} | 6^{6} | 6
WC | (United Kingdom) Jodie Burrage | 6^{3} | 7^{8} | 1
(United Kingdom) Heather Watson | 6 | 4 | 5
11 | (Slovakia) Viktória Hrunčáková | 3 | 6 | 7

Qualifying competition
4 | (Belgium) Greet Minnen | 7^{7} | 6
11 | (Slovakia) Viktória Hrunčáková | 6^{5} | 1

==== Fifth qualifier ====
First round
5 | (Thailand) Mananchaya Sawangkaew | 6 | 6
(United Kingdom) Lily Miyazaki | 2 | 3
WC | (United Kingdom) Amelia Rajecki | 4 | 2
12 | (Japan) Aoi Ito | 6 | 6

Qualifying competition
5 | (Thailand) Mananchaya Sawangkaew | 7^{7} | 6
12 | (Japan) Aoi Ito | 6^{3} | 3

==== Sixth qualifier ====
First round
6 | (Japan) Nao Hibino | 7^{9} | 6
(Georgia (country)) Mariam Bolkvadze | 6^{7} | 1
(Japan) Sayaka Ishii | 6 | 2 | 4
8 | (Czech Republic) Vendula Valdmannová | 3 | 6 | 6

Qualifying competition
6 | (Japan) Nao Hibino | 6 | 6
8 | (Czech Republic) Vendula Valdmannová | 4 | 2
