= 2025 Samsun Open – Singles =

Singles
- 2025 Samsun Open

Final
- Champion: (Slovenia) Kaja Juvan
- Runner-up: (Czech Republic) Nikola Bartůňková
- Score: 7–6^{(10–8)}, 6–3

Events
Singles	Doubles
Samsun Open	· 2026 →

This was the first edition of the tournament.

Kaja Juvan won the title, defeating Nikola Bartůňková 7–6^{(10–8)}, 6–3 in the final.

== Seeds ==
1. (France) Tiantsoa Rakotomanga Rajaonah (second round)
2. (Slovenia) Kaja Juvan (champion)
3. (Czech Republic) Nikola Bartůňková (final)
4. (Italy) Lucrezia Stefanini (first round)
5. (Czech Republic) Darja Vidmanová (semifinals)
6. (Spain) Kaitlin Quevedo (quarterfinals)
7. Maria Timofeeva (quarterfinals)
8. (Belgium) Sofia Costoulas (quarterfinals)

== Draw ==
Key

- Q = Qualifier
- WC = Wild card
- LL = Lucky loser
- Alt = Alternate
- ITF = ITF entry
- PR = Protected ranking
- SR = Special ranking
- SE = Special exempt
- JE = Junior exempt
- JR = Junior Accelerator Programme entrant
- CO = College Accelerator Programme entrant
- NG = Next Gen Accelerator Program entrant
- w/o = Walkover
- r = Retired
- d = Defaulted

=== Finals ===
Semifinals
5	(Czech Republic) Darja Vidmanová	4	5
3	(Czech Republic) Nikola Bartůňková	6	7
(Poland) Linda Klimovičová	7^{11}	4	2
2	(Slovenia) Kaja Juvan	6^{9}	6	6

Final
3	(Czech Republic) Nikola Bartůňková	6^{8}	3
2	(Slovenia) Kaja Juvan	7^{10}	6

=== Top half ===
First round
1	(France) T Rakotomanga Rajaonah	0	6	6
(France) H Tan	6	4	2
V Diatchenko	4	6^{4}
(France) A Hesse	6	7^{7}
(Croatia) J Fett	6^{3}	4
WC	(Turkey) B Cengiz	7^{7}	6
(Ukraine) A Sobolieva	6^{3}	4
5	(Czech Republic) D Vidmanová	7^{7}	6
3	(Czech Republic) N Bartůňková	3	6	6
(Turkey) İ Öz	6	3	2
(Slovenia) D Jakupović	2	2
(Turkey) A Aksu	6	6
(Turkey) Ç Büyükakçay	6	3	3
(United Kingdom) E Appleton	3	6	6
Q	(United States) CYS Lee	6	6^{5}	1
6	(Spain) K Quevedo	4	7^{7}	6

Second round
1	(France) T Rakotomanga Rajaonah	2	5
(France) A Hesse	6	7
WC	(Turkey) B Cengiz	1	0
5	(Czech Republic) D Vidmanová	6	6
3	(Czech Republic) N Bartůňková	6	6
(Turkey) A Aksu	3	1
(United Kingdom) E Appleton	3	4
6	(Spain) K Quevedo	6	6

Quarterfinals
(France) A Hesse	2	2
5	(Czech Republic) D Vidmanová	6	6
3	(Czech Republic) N Bartůňková	5	6	6
6	(Spain) K Quevedo	7	1	4

Semifinals
5	(Czech Republic) D Vidmanová	4	5
3	(Czech Republic) N Bartůňková	6	7

=== Bottom half ===
First round
8	(Belgium) S Costoulas	7^{7}	6
Q	(Poland) W Falkowska	6^{1}	4
WC	(Czech Republic) Ka Plíšková	4	3
(North Macedonia) L Gjorcheska	6	6
(France) T Andrianjafitrimo	5	6	2
(Germany) C Werner	7	4	6
(Poland) L Klimovičová	6	6
4/WC	(Italy) L Stefanini	2	1
7	M Timofeeva	6	6
(Lithuania) J Mikulskytė	0	3
(United Kingdom) H Dart	2	4
Q	(Bulgaria) I Shinikova	6	6
Q	E Nepliy	4	0
A Tikhonova	6	6
WC	(Turkey) D Çırpanlı	1	2
2	(Slovenia) K Juvan	6	6

Second round
8	(Belgium) S Costoulas	6	6
(North Macedonia) L Gjorcheska	1	4
(Germany) C Werner	3	1
(Poland) L Klimovičová	6	6
7	M Timofeeva	6	6
Q	(Bulgaria) I Shinikova	2	2
A Tikhonova	0	4
2	(Slovenia) K Juvan	6	6

Quarterfinals
8	(Belgium) S Costoulas	3	4
(Poland) L Klimovičová	6	6
7	M Timofeeva	3	6	2
2	(Slovenia) K Juvan	6	4	6

Semifinals
(Poland) L Klimovičová	7^{11}	4	2
2	(Slovenia) K Juvan	6^{9}	6	6

== Qualifying ==
=== Seeds ===
1. (United States) Carol Young Suh Lee (qualified)
2. (Bulgaria) Isabella Shinikova (qualified)
3. (Slovakia) Martina Okáľová (withdrew)
4. (Poland) Weronika Falkowska (qualified)
5. (Poland) Urszula Radwańska (first round)
6. Ekaterina Ovcharenko (qualifying competition)
7. Ekaterina Yashina (qualifying competition)
8. Ksenia Zaytseva (qualifying competition)

=== Qualifiers ===
1. (United States) Carol Young Suh Lee
2. (Bulgaria) Isabella Shinikova
3. Elina Nepliy
4. (Poland) Weronika Falkowska

=== Qualifying draw ===
==== First qualifier ====
First round
1	(United States) Carol Young Suh Lee	6	6
WC	(United Kingdom) Emily Webley-Smith	3	2
(Netherlands) Demi Tran	6	2	6
5	(Poland) Urszula Radwańska	2	6	3

Qualifying competition
1	(United States) Carol Young Suh Lee	6	6
(Netherlands) Demi Tran	3	2

==== Second qualifier ====
First round
2	(Bulgaria) Isabella Shinikova	6	6
(Ukraine) Nadiya Kolb	2	4
(Romania) Mihaela Buzărnescu	3	4
8	Ksenia Zaytseva	6	6

Qualifying competition
2	(Bulgaria) Isabella Shinikova	6	7^{7}
8	Ksenia Zaytseva	2	6^{5}

==== Third qualifier ====
First round
Alt	(Ukraine) Maryna Kolb	3	0
Elina Nepliy	6	6
WC	(Turkey) Ayşe Saraçoğlu	0	0
7	Ekaterina Yashina	6	6

Qualifying competition
Elina Nepliy	6	7^{7}
7	Ekaterina Yashina	4	6^{4}

==== Fourth qualifier ====
First round
4	(Poland) Weronika Falkowska	7	6
(Slovenia) Nika Radišić	5	3
(Turkey) Selina Atay	5	1
6	Ekaterina Ovcharenko	7	6

Qualifying competition
4	(Poland) Weronika Falkowska	6	7^{7}
6	Ekaterina Ovcharenko	4	6^{2}
