= 2026 Birmingham Open – Men's doubles =

Men's doubles
- 2026 Birmingham Open

Final
- Champions: (United Kingdom) Ben Jones (United Kingdom) Joshua Paris
- Runners-up: (India) Anirudh Chandrasekar (Japan) Takeru Yuzuki
- Score: 6–4, 7–6^{(7–4)}

Events
Singles	men	women
Doubles	men	women
- Birmingham Open

Marcelo Demoliner and Sadio Doumbia were the defending champions but only Doumbia chose to defend his title, partnering Santiago González. They lost in the first round to Finn Reynolds and James Watt.

Ben Jones and Joshua Paris won the title after defeating Anirudh Chandrasekar and Takeru Yuzuki 6–4, 7–6^{(7–4)} in the final.

== Seeds ==
1. (France) Sadio Doumbia / (Mexico) Santiago González (first round)
2. (United States) Vasil Kirkov / (Australia) John Peers (semifinals)
3. (Brazil) Fernando Romboli / (Australia) John-Patrick Smith (first round)
4. (Chinese Taipei) Ray Ho / (Germany) Hendrik Jebens (first round)

== Draw ==
Key

- Q = Qualifier
- WC = Wild card
- LL = Lucky loser
- Alt = Alternate
- ITF = ITF entry
- PR = Protected ranking
- SR = Special ranking
- SE = Special exempt
- JE = Junior exempt
- JR = Junior Accelerator Programme entrant
- CO = College Accelerator Programme entrant
- NG = Next Gen Accelerator Program entrant
- w/o = Walkover
- r = Retired
- d = Defaulted

First round
1	(France) S Doumbia (Mexico) S González	3	6^{3}
(New Zealand) F Reynolds (New Zealand) J Watt	6	7^{7}
(India) A Chandrasekar (Japan) T Yuzuki	4	7^{7}	[10]
WC	(United Kingdom) F Bass (United Kingdom) S Duncan	6	6^{5}	[1]
3	(Brazil) F Romboli (Australia) J-P Smith	6	4	[7]
(Ecuador) D Hidalgo (United States) P Trhac	4	6	[10]
Alt	(South Africa) L Harris (Finland) O Virtanen	6^{10}	3
PR	(China) Y Bu (China) Z Zhang	7^{12}	6
(Australia) R Hijikata (United States) M McDonald	5	2
(United States) M Damm (Japan) S Mochizuki	7	6
(United Kingdom) B Jones (United Kingdom) J Paris	7^{7}	7
4	(Chinese Taipei) R Ho (Germany) H Jebens	6^{3}	5
(Switzerland) L Riedi (Australia) T Schoolkate	7	6^{3}	[10]
(Ecuador) G Escobar (United States) B Kittay	5	7^{7}	[3]
WC	(United Kingdom) C Broom (United Kingdom) D Stevenson	3	4
2	(United States) V Kirkov (Australia) J Peers	6	6

Quarterfinals
(New Zealand) F Reynolds (New Zealand) J Watt	6^{3}	3
(India) A Chandrasekar (Japan) T Yuzuki	7^{7}	6
(Ecuador) D Hidalgo (United States) P Trhac	w/o
PR	(China) Y Bu (China) Z Zhang
(United States) M Damm (Japan) S Mochizuki
(United Kingdom) B Jones (United Kingdom) J Paris	w/o
(Switzerland) L Riedi (Australia) T Schoolkate	4	7	[6]
2	(United States) V Kirkov (Australia) J Peers	6	5	[10]

Semifinals
(India) A Chandrasekar (Japan) T Yuzuki	7	7^{7}
(Ecuador) D Hidalgo (United States) P Trhac	5	6^{5}
(United Kingdom) B Jones (United Kingdom) J Paris	6	4	[10]
2	(United States) V Kirkov (Australia) J Peers	2	6	[6]

Final
(India) A Chandrasekar (Japan) T Yuzuki	4	6^{4}
(United Kingdom) B Jones (United Kingdom) J Paris	6	7^{7}
