= 2023 Edge Istanbul – Singles =

Singles
- 2023 Edge Istanbul

Final
- Champion: (Romania) Irina Bara
- Runner-up: (Turkey) Berfu Cengiz
- Score: 6–7^{(2–7)}, 6–4, 6–1

Events
Singles	Doubles
← 2022 ·	Edge Istanbul	· 2024 →

Diana Shnaider was the defending champion but chose not to participate.

Irina Bara won the title, defeating Berfu Cengiz in the final, 6–7^{(2–7)}, 6–4, 6–1.

== Seeds ==
1. (United Kingdom) Katie Swan (second round)
2. (Czech Republic) Sára Bejlek (quarterfinals)
3. (Australia) Priscilla Hon (first round)
4. (Australia) Jaimee Fourlis (first round)
5. Darya Astakhova (semifinals)
6. Ekaterina Makarova (quarterfinals)
7. (Slovenia) Dalila Jakupović (first round)
8. (North Macedonia) Lina Gjorcheska (first round)

== Draw ==
=== Key ===
- Q = Qualifier
- WC = Wild card
- LL = Lucky loser
- Alt = Alternate
- ITF = ITF entry
- PR = Protected ranking
- SR = Special ranking
- SE = Special exempt
- JE = Junior exempt
- JR = Junior Accelerator Programme entrant
- CO = College Accelerator Programme entrant
- NG = Next Gen Accelerator Program entrant
- w/o = Walkover
- r = Retired
- d = Defaulted

=== Finals ===
Semifinals
(Romania) Irina Bara	6	6
WC	(Turkey) İlay Yörük	1	3
(Turkey) Berfu Cengiz	6	2
5	Darya Astakhova	2	1^{r}

Final
(Romania) Irina Bara	6^{2}	6	6
(Turkey) Berfu Cengiz	7^{7}	4	1

=== Top half ===
First round
1	(United Kingdom) K Swan	6	7^{7}
WC	(Turkey) B Eraydın	3	6^{3}
LL	(Romania) MS Popa	6^{1}	2
Q	E Maklakova	7^{7}	6
Q	(Estonia) M Nuudi	6	2	6
WC	(Turkey) A Mert	0	6	3
(Romania) I Bara	3	6	7
8	(North Macedonia) L Gjorcheska	6	2	5
4	(Australia) J Fourlis	5	1
Q	D Lodikova	7	6
(Romania) C Dinu	6^{3}	4
WC	(Turkey) İ Yörük	7^{7}	6
Q	A Korneeva	3	4
(Ukraine) V Strakhova	6	6
A Zolotareva	3	5
6	E Makarova	6	7

Second round
1	(United Kingdom) K Swan	2	6^{2}
Q	E Maklakova	6	7^{7}
Q	(Estonia) M Nuudi	0	1
(Romania) I Bara	6	6
Q	D Lodikova	3	3
WC	(Turkey) İ Yörük	6	6
(Ukraine) V Strakhova	6	5	1
6	E Makarova	4	7	6

Quarterfinals
Q	E Maklakova	1	3
(Romania) I Bara	6	6
WC	(Turkey) İ Yörük	6	7^{7}
6	E Makarova	2	6^{2}

Semifinals
(Romania) I Bara	6	6
WC	(Turkey) İ Yörük	1	3

=== Bottom half ===
First round
7	(Slovenia) D Jakupović	2	4
(Turkey) Z Sönmez	6	6
(Bulgaria) G Topalova	6	6
Q	(Bulgaria) D Glushkova	1	1
(Romania) A Cadanțu-Ignatik	5	3
(Turkey) B Cengiz	7	6
I Khromacheva	6	5	6
3	(Australia) P Hon	3	7	0
5	D Astakhova	6	6
S Lansere	3	4
Q	(Netherlands) L Stevens	6	6
WC	(Turkey) A Aksu	4	3
Q	(Greece) M Matoula	6^{4}	1
T Prozorova	7^{7}	6
(Turkey) Ç Büyükakçay	4	6	3
2	(Czech Republic) S Bejlek	6	2	6

Second round
(Turkey) Z Sönmez	6	7
(Bulgaria) G Topalova	1	5
(Turkey) B Cengiz	7^{7}	2	6
I Khromacheva	6^{0}	6	4
5	D Astakhova	6	6
Q	(Netherlands) L Stevens	3	2
T Prozorova	6^{8}	6^{1}
2	(Czech Republic) S Bejlek	7^{10}	7^{7}

Quarterfinals
(Turkey) Z Sönmez	6	1	4
(Turkey) B Cengiz	4	6	6
5	D Astakhova	5	6	6
2	(Czech Republic) S Bejlek	7	1	4

Semifinals
(Turkey) B Cengiz	6	2
5	D Astakhova	2	1^{r}
