= 2022 Edge Istanbul – Singles =

Singles
- 2022 Edge Istanbul

Final
- Champion: Diana Shnaider
- Runner-up: (Czech Republic) Nikola Bartůňková
- Score: 7–5, 7–5

Events
Singles	Doubles
Edge Istanbul	· 2023 →

This was the first edition of the tournament.

Diana Shnaider won the title, defeating Nikola Bartůňková in the final, 7–5, 7–5.

== Seeds ==
1. (Bulgaria) Viktoriya Tomova (second round)
2. (Romania) Mihaela Buzărnescu (quarterfinals)
3. (Japan) Mai Hontama (quarterfinals)
4. (Switzerland) Susan Bandecchi (second round)
5. Anastasia Tikhonova (second round)
6. Marina Melnikova (second round)
7. (Netherlands) Suzan Lamens (semifinals)
8. (United States) Caty McNally (first round)

== Draw ==
=== Key ===
- Q = Qualifier
- WC = Wild card
- LL = Lucky loser
- Alt = Alternate
- SE = Special exempt
- PR = Protected ranking
- ITF = ITF entry
- JE = Junior exempt
- w/o = Walkover
- r = Retired
- d = Defaulted
- SR = Special ranking

=== Finals ===
Semifinals
JE	Diana Shnaider	6	6
Q	(Poland) Maja Chwalińska	4	4
Q	(Czech Republic) Nikola Bartůňková	6	6
7	(Netherlands) Suzan Lamens	0	3

Final
JE	Diana Shnaider	7	7
Q	(Czech Republic) Nikola Bartůňková	5	5

=== Top half ===
First round
1	(Bulgaria) V Tomova	6	6
Q	(Romania) O Gavrilă	4	1
Q	(Romania) N Dascălu	2	6	2
JE	D Shnaider	6	4	6
(United Kingdom) Y Miyazaki	6	6^{8}	7
LL	(Turkey) A Aksu	2	7^{10}	5
(Spain) A Bolsova	6	3	6
8	(United States) C McNally	2	6	1
4	(Switzerland) S Bandecchi	6	6
(Bulgaria) I Shinikova	4	4
SE	(Italy) C Rosatello	2	2
(Belgium) Y Bonaventure	6	6
(Czech Republic) J Malečková	5	4
Q	(Poland) M Chwalińska	7	6
Q	(Spain) Á Fita Boluda	4	6^{8}
5	A Tikhonova	6	7^{10}

Second round
1	(Bulgaria) V Tomova	1	0
JE	D Shnaider	6	6
(United Kingdom) Y Miyazaki	1	1
(Spain) A Bolsova	6	6
4	(Switzerland) S Bandecchi	4	4
(Belgium) Y Bonaventure	6	6
Q	(Poland) M Chwalińska	6	7
5	A Tikhonova	4	5

Quarterfinals
JE	D Shnaider	6	6
(Spain) A Bolsova	2	1
(Belgium) Y Bonaventure	2	1
Q	(Poland) M Chwalińska	6	6

Semifinals
JE	D Shnaider	6	6
Q	(Poland) M Chwalińska	4	4

=== Bottom half ===
First round
6	M Melnikova	6	6
Q	(Bulgaria) L Karatancheva	1	4
Q	(Czech Republic) N Bartůňková	6	6
(Luxembourg) M Minella	2	4
WC	(Turkey) Z Sönmez	0	6	6
A Zakharova	6	4	0
WC	A Anshba	6^{0}	0
3	(Japan) M Hontama	7^{7}	6
7	(Netherlands) S Lamens	7	1	6
WC	(Turkey) B Cengiz	5	6	1
WC	(Turkey) İ Yörük	1	2
Q	(Romania) A Prisăcariu	6	6
(United Kingdom) K Swan	6	6
(Italy) F Di Sarra	2	0
Q	(Serbia) N Stevanović	4	6	3
2	(Romania) M Buzărnescu	6	2	6

Second round
6	M Melnikova	2	2
Q	(Czech Republic) N Bartůňková	6	6
WC	(Turkey) Z Sönmez	6	4	5
3	(Japan) M Hontama	4	6	7
7	(Netherlands) S Lamens	6	6
Q	(Romania) A Prisăcariu	1	2
(United Kingdom) K Swan	7	2	2
2	(Romania) M Buzărnescu	5	6	6

Quarterfinals
Q	(Czech Republic) N Bartůňková	6	6
3	(Japan) M Hontama	0	2
7	(Netherlands) S Lamens	6	6
2	(Romania) M Buzărnescu	4	2

Semifinals
Q	(Czech Republic) N Bartůňková	6	6
7	(Netherlands) S Lamens	0	3
