= Edge Istanbul =

- 2022 Edge Istanbul

ITF Women's Tour
- Event name: Edge Istanbul
- Location: Istanbul, Turkey
- Venue: TTF Istanbul Tennis Center
- Category: ITF Women's World Tennis Tour
- Surface: Clay / outdoor
- Draw: 32S/32Q/16D
- Prize money: $60,000

The Edge Istanbul is a tournament for professional female tennis players played on outdoor clay courts. The event is classified as a $60,000 ITF Women's World Tennis Tour tournament and has been held in Istanbul, Turkey, since 2022.

== Past finals ==
=== Singles ===
Year	Champion	Runner-up	Score
2023	(Romania) Irina Bara	(Turkey) Berfu Cengiz	6–7^{(2–7)}, 6–4, 6–1
2022	Diana Shnaider	(Czech Republic) Nikola Bartůňková	7–5, 7–5

=== Doubles ===
Year	Champions	Runners-up	Score
2023	(Slovenia) Dalila Jakupović; Irina Khromacheva	(Australia) Priscilla Hon (Ukraine) Valeriya Strakhova	7–6^{(7–3)}, 6–4
2022	(Poland) Maja Chwalińska (Czech Republic) Jesika Malečková	(Turkey) Berfu Cengiz; Anastasia Tikhonova	2–6, 6–4, [10–7]
