= Nikola Bartůňková =

Czech tennis player (born 2006)

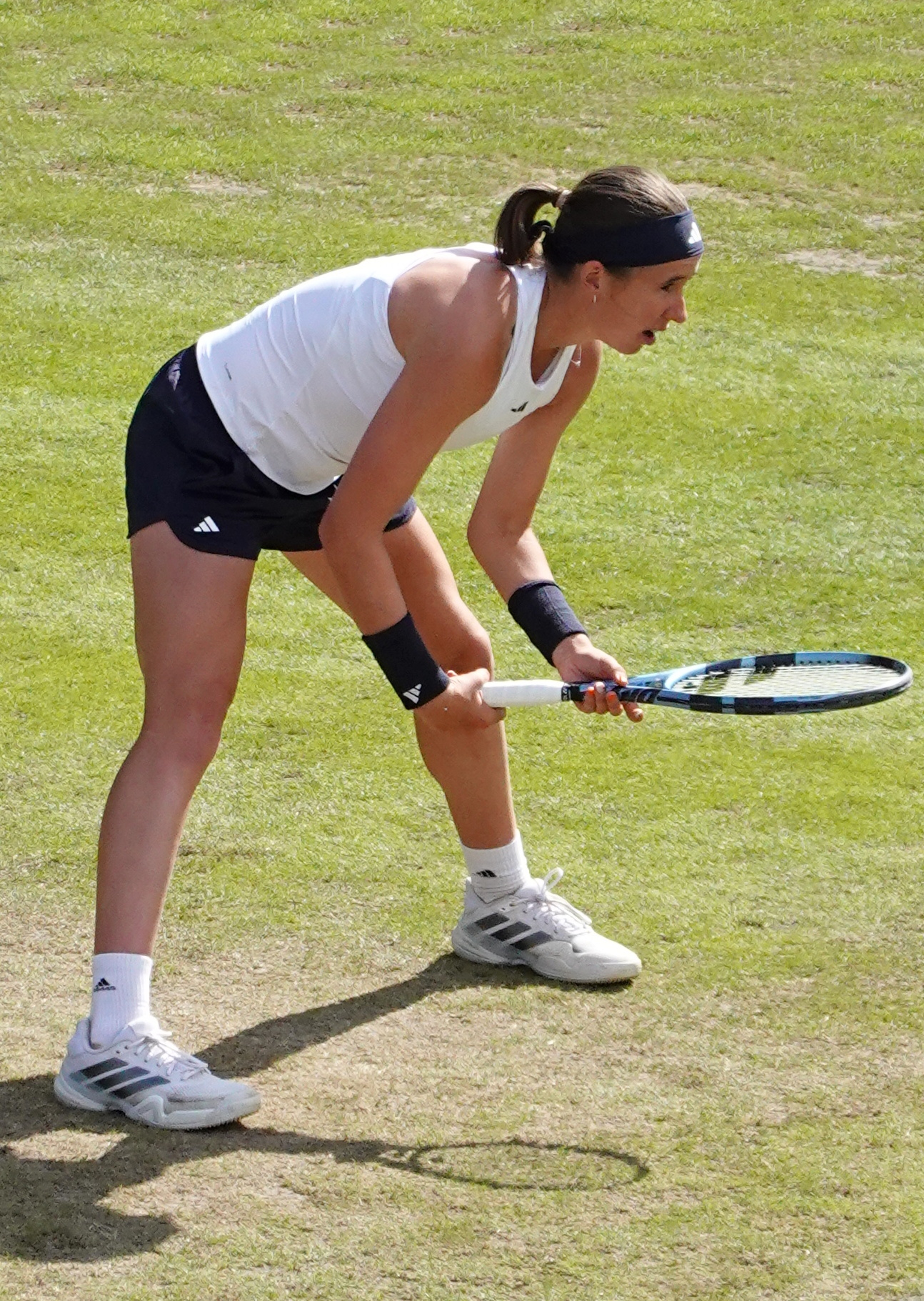
- Bartůňková at the 2026 Birmingham Open
- Country (sports): Czech Republic
- Residence: Prague, Czech Republic
- Born: 25 February 2006 (age 20) Prague, Czech Republic
- Height: 1.84 m (6 ft 0 in)
- Turned pro: 2021
- Plays: Right (two-handed backhand)
- Coach: Pavel Bartůněk
- Prize money: US$ 1,426,148

Singles
- Career record: 172–83
- Career titles: 6 ITF
- Highest ranking: No. 29 (12 October 2026)
- Current ranking: No. 29 (12 October 2026)

Grand Slam singles results
- Australian Open: 3R (2026)
- French Open: 1R (2026)
- Wimbledon: 3R (2026)
- US Open: 3R (2026)

Doubles
- Career record: 16–15
- Career titles: 0
- Highest ranking: No. 320 (14 August 2023)
- Current ranking: No. 759 (24 August 2026)

Grand Slam doubles results
- Wimbledon: 1R (2026)
- US Open: 1R (2026)
- Last updated on: 24 August 2026.

Nikola Bartůňková (born 25 February 2006) is a Czech professional tennis player. She has a career-high singles ranking by the WTA of No. 29, achieved on 12 October 2026, and a best doubles ranking of No. 320, reached on 14 August 2023.

== Career ==
=== 2021–24: Tour debut, six months anti-doping ban ===
In April 2021, at the 2021 İstanbul Cup, Bartůňková defeated world No. 152, Leonie Küng, in the first round of qualifying, but lost in the second to Anastasia Gasanova.

She made her WTA Tour debut at the same tournament one year later, after being handed a wildcard entry into the main draw, losing to Anastasia Potapova.

On 16 October 2023, Bartůňková won her first tour-level match when she defeated Dayana Yastremska in the first round of the 2023 Transylvania Open, before losing in three hours to Ana Bogdan in the second round.

In November 2024, Bartůňková was issued with a six-month competition ban backdated to April 2024 for an anti-doping rule violation after testing positive for unintentional use of trimetazidine (TMZ) at two events in early 2024. She had been provisionally suspended from May 2024 until the conclusion of the investigation. The International Tennis Integrity Agency (ITIA) accepted that the source of the TMZ was a contaminated supplement for which she bore "no significant fault or negligence" for having ingested.

=== 2025: WTA 500 semifinal & 125 final ===
In January, Bartůňková played first matches after end of her hiatus in Oslo, reaching semifinal at W15 event where she lost to Anouck Vrancken Peeters. At her second event at the W35 in Sunderland, she claimed her fourth career title. Bartůňková reached another final just a week after the W35 event in Glasgow. In July, she qualified for the Ladies Open Hechingen and beat two former top-100 players, María Lourdes Carlé and Julia Grabher, en route to her first W75 title. In September, Bartůňková was awarded a wildcard into Guadalajara 125 Open, where she lost to eventual finalist Panna Udvardy in the second round. The following week, she received another wildcard entry, this time at the WTA 500 Guadalajara Open, and scored her second and third WTA Tour main-draw wins over Nicole Fossa Huergo and fellow Czech player Darja Viďmanová in straight sets to reach her maiden tour quarterfinal, where she overcame defending champion Magdalena Fręch. Her run was ended in the semifinals by eventual champion, Iva Jovic, in three sets. As a result, she moved up more than 80 places in the rankings to enter the top 200 for the first time at world No. 144, on 15 September 2025.

In October, Bartůňková reached her first WTA 125 final at the Samsun Open but lost to second seed Kaja Juvan. Bartůňková received a wildcard to the WTA 500 Pan Pacific Open in Tokyo but lost to local wildcard Wakana Sonobe. The following week, she lost in the opening round in Chennai, after losing to eventual finalist Kimberly Birrell, in three sets.

In November, Bartůňková received her first nomination for the national team in the 2025 Billie Jean King Cup and helped her team to win Group D. The Czech teenager defeated Yuliana Lizarazo from Colombia, but lost to Petra Marčinko from Croatia.

=== 2026: Major, WTA 1000 debuts & first top 10 win, top 50 ===
In January, Bartůňková entered her first major qualifying at the 2026 Australian Open as the 16th seed. She then scored three wins to make her main-draw debut, where she defeated former top-10 player Daria Kasatkina for her first major match win. Bartůňková reached the third round with an upset over Belinda Bencic, marking her first top-10 win. Her run was ended in the third round by 21st seed Elise Mertens. Following making the final round of qualifying of the Miami Open, Bartůňková entered the top 100 in the singles rankings at No. 95 on 30 March 2026, becoming the fourth 2006-born player to achieve the feat (after Victoria Mboko, Maya Joint and Sara Bejlek).

Bartůňková made her WTA 1000 debut at the 2026 Italian Open as a lucky loser, entering the main draw directly in the second round, replacing tenth seed Victoria Mboko. She recorded her first win at the 1000-level over wildcard Tyra Grant. She reached the last 16 of a WTA 1000 for the first time by upsetting 17th seed Madison Keys. Bartůňková reached her first WTA 125 final on grass at the Birmingham Open, where she lost to top seed Alexandra Eala, in three sets.

== Performance timelines ==
Key
W	F	SF	QF	#R	RR	Q#	P#	DNQ	A	Z#	PO	G	S	B	NMS	NTI	P	NH

(W) winner; (F) finalist; (SF) semifinalist; (QF) quarterfinalist; (#R) rounds 4, 3, 2, 1; (RR) round-robin stage; (Q#) qualification round; (P#) preliminary round; (DNQ) did not qualify; (A) absent; (Z#) Davis/Fed Cup Zonal Group (with number indication) or (PO) play-off; (G) gold, (S) silver or (B) bronze Olympic/Paralympic medal; (NMS) not a Masters tournament; (NTI) not a Tier I tournament; (P) postponed; (NH) not held; (SR) strike rate (events won / competed); (W–L) win–loss record.
To avoid confusion and double counting, these charts are updated at the conclusion of a tournament or when the player's participation has ended.

Only main-draw results in WTA Tour, Grand Slam tournaments, Billie Jean King Cup, United Cup, Hopman Cup and Olympic Games are included in win–loss records.

=== Singles ===
Current through the 2026 Pan Pacific Open.

Tournament	2022	2023	2024	2025	2026	SR	W–L	Win%
Grand Slam tournaments
Australian Open	A	A	A	A	3R	0 / 1	2–1	67%
French Open	A	A	A	A	1R	0 / 1	0–1	0%
Wimbledon	A	A	A	A	3R	0 / 1	2–1	67%
US Open	A	A	A	A	3R	0 / 1	2–1	67%
Win–Loss	0–0	0–0	0–0	0–0	6–4	0 / 4	6–4	60%
WTA 1000 tournaments
Qatar Open	A	NTI	A	A	A	0 / 0	0–0	–
Dubai Championships	NTI	A	A	A	A	0 / 0	0–0	–
Indian Wells Open	A	A	A	A	Q2	0 / 0	0–0	–
Miami Open	A	A	A	A	Q2	0 / 0	0–0	–
Madrid Open	A	A	A	A	Q2	0 / 0	0–0	–
Italian Open	A	A	A	A	4R	0 / 1	2–1	67%
Canadian Open	A	A	A	A	3R	0 / 1	2–1	67%
Cincinnati Open	A	A	A	A	2R	0 / 1	1–1	50%
China Open	NH	A	A	A	SF	0 / 1	4–1	80%
Wuhan Open	Not Held		A	A	2R	0 / 1	1–1	50%
Win–Loss	0–0	0–0	0–0	0–0	10–5	0 / 5	10–5	67%
Career statistics
	2022	2023	2024	2025	2026	SR	W–L	Win %
Tournaments	1	1	0	3	16	Career total: 21		
Titles	0	0	0	0	0	Career total: 0		
Finals	0	0	0	0	0	Career total: 0		
Hard Win–Loss	0–0	1–1	0–0	4–4	19–11	0 / 15	24–16	60%
Clay Win–Loss	0–1	0–0	0–0	0–0	2–2	0 / 3	2–3	40%
Grass Win–Loss	0–0	0–0	0–0	0–0	4–3	0 / 3	4–3	57%
Overall Win–Loss	0–1	1–1	0–0	4–4	25–16	0 / 21	30–22	58%
Year-end ranking	283	270	488	130		$1,784,188		

=== Doubles ===
Current through the 2026 Wuhan Open.

Tournament	2022	2023	2024	2025	2026	SR	W–L	Win%
Grand Slam tournaments
Australian Open	A	A	A	A	A	0 / 0	0–0	–
French Open	A	A	A	A	A	0 / 0	0–0	–
Wimbledon	A	A	A	A	1R	0 / 1	0–1	0%
US Open	A	A	A	A	1R	0 / 1	0–1	0%
Win–Loss	0–0	0–0	0–0	0–0	0–2	0 / 2	0–2	0%
WTA 1000 tournaments
China Open	NH	A	A	A	2R	0 / 1	1–1	50%
Wuhan Open	Not Held		A	A	1R	0 / 1	0–1	0%
Win–Loss	0–0	0–0	0–0	0–0	1–2	0 / 2	1–2	33%
Career statistics
Tournaments	1	1	0	1	5	Career total: 8		
Overall Win–Loss	1–1	1–1	0–0	0–1	2–4	0 / 8	4–7	36%

== WTA 125 finals ==
=== Singles: 2 (2 runner-ups) ===
Result	W–L	Date	Tournament	Surface	Opponent	Score
Loss	0–1	Oct 2025	Samsun Open, Turkey	Hard	(Slovenia) Kaja Juvan	6–7^{(8–10)}, 3–6
Loss	0–2	Jun 2026	Birmingham Open, United Kingdom	Grass	(Philippines) Alexandra Eala	7–5, 3–6, 5–7

== ITF Circuit finals ==
=== Singles: 11 (6 titles, 5 runner-ups) ===
Legend W60/75 tournaments (1–1) W50 tournaments (0–1) W25/35 tournaments (5–3)	Finals by surface Hard (1–3) Clay (5–2)

Result	W–L	Date	Tournament	Tier	Surface	Opponent	Score
Loss	0–1	Nov 2021	ITF Milovice, Czech Republic	W25	Hard (i)	(Czech Republic) Linda Nosková	3–6, 4–6
Loss	0–2	May 2022	Edge Istanbul, Turkey	W60	Clay	Diana Shnaider	5–7, 5–7
Win	1–2	Apr 2023	ITF Santa Margherita di Pula, Italy	W25	Clay	(Switzerland) Ylena In-Albon	6–0, 7–5
Win	2–2	Aug 2023	ITF Erwitte, Germany	W25	Clay	(Latvia) Daniela Vismane	6–4, 6–1
Win	3–2	Oct 2023	ITF Santa Margherita di Pula, Italy	W25	Clay	(Germany) Katharina Hobgarski	6–0, 1–0 ret.
Loss	3–3	Jan 2024	ITF Sunderland, United Kingdom	W35	Hard (i)	(Switzerland) Valentina Ryser	3–6, 6–7^{(6–8)}
Win	4–3	Jan 2025	ITF Sunderland, United Kingdom	W35	Hard (i)	(United Kingdom) Amelia Rajecki	6–4, 3–6, 6–3
Loss	4–4	Jan 2025	GB Pro-Series Glasgow, United Kingdom	W35	Hard (i)	(Switzerland) Valentina Ryser	5–7, 6–7^{(6–8)}
Win	5–4	Jun 2025	ITF Stuttgart-Vaihingen, Germany	W35	Clay	(Germany) Emily Seibold	6–4, 7–6^{(7–2)}
Loss	5–5	Jul 2025	ITF Aschaffenburg, Germany	W50	Clay	(Italy) Nuria Brancaccio	6–4, 4–6, 4–6
Win	6–5	Jul 2025	Ladies Open Hechingen, Germany	W75	Clay	(Austria) Julia Grabher	7–5, 6–2

== ITF Junior Circuit ==
=== Junior Grand Slam finals ===
==== Singles: 1 (runner-up) ====
Result	Year	Tournament	Surface	Opponent	Score
Loss	2023	Wimbledon	Grass	(United States) Clervie Ngounoue	2–6, 2–6

==== Doubles: 1 (runner-up) ====
Result	Year	Tournament	Surface	Partner	Opponents	Score
Loss	2022	French Open	Clay	(Switzerland) Céline Naef	(Czech Republic) Sára Bejlek (Czech Republic) Lucie Havlíčková	3–6, 3–6

=== ITF Junior Circuit finals ===
==== Singles: 10 (6 titles, 4 runner-ups) ====
Legend
Grade A (0–1)
Grade 1 (1–1)
Grade 2 / J200 (3–0)
Grade 3 (0–2)
Grade 4 (2–0)

Result	W–L	Date	Tournament	Tier	Surface	Opponent	Score
Win	1–0	Jul 2019	ITF Prague, Czech Republic	Grade 4	Clay	(Slovakia) Radka Zelníčková	6–3, 6–3
Win	2–0	Oct 2019	ITF Budapest, Hungary	Grade 4	Clay	(Hungary) Luca Janosi	6–3, 6–4
Loss	2–1	Jan 2020	ITF Bromma, Sweden	Grade 3	Hard	(Poland) Weronika Baszak	4–6, 3–6
Loss	2–2	Feb 2020	ITF Kärnten, Austria	Grade 3	Carpet	(Germany) Laura Isabel Pütz	2–6, 6–4, 3–6
Loss	2–3	May 2021	ITF Říčany, Czech Republic	Grade 1	Clay	(Germany) Julia Middendorf	3–6, 6–4, 6–7^{(4–7)}
Loss	2–4	Jul 2021	ITF Milan, Italy	Grade A	Clay	(Philippines) Alexandra Eala	3–6, 3–6
Win	3–4	Sep 2021	ITF Rakovník, Czech Republic	Grade 2	Clay	(Czech Republic) Tereza Valentová	2–6, 6–1, 6–0
Finalist	NP	Mar 2022	ITF Benicarló, Spain	Grade 2	Clay	(Bulgaria) Yoana Konstantinova	cancelled
Win	4–4	Mar 2022	ITF Villena, Spain	Grade 1	Clay	(Belgium) Hanne Vandewinkel	7–5, 6–1
Win	5–4	Jan 2023	ITF Bratislava, Slovakia	J200	Hard	(Czech Republic) Kristýna Tomajková	6–1, 6–1
Win	6–4	Feb 2023	ITF Oberhaching, Germany	J200	Hard	Vlada Mincheva	6–0, 6–3

==== Doubles: 6 (5 titles, 1 runner-up) ====
Legend
Grade 1 (1–1)
Grade 2 (4–0)

Result	W–L	Date	Tournament	Tier	Surface	Partner	Opponents	Score
Win	1–0	Sep 2020	ITF Rakovník, Czech Republic	Grade 2	Clay	(Czech Republic) Nelly Kněžková	(Poland) Rozalia Gruszczynska (Poland) Pola Wygonowska	6–1, 6–2
Win	2–0	May 2021	ITF Říčany, Czech Republic	Grade 1	Clay	(Czech Republic) Sára Bejlek	(United States) Alexis Blokhina (France) Flavie Brugnone	6–3, 6–4
Win	3–0	May 2021	ITF Hannover, Germany	Grade 2	Clay	(Switzerland) Céline Naef	(Germany) Tea Lukic (Germany) Laura Isabel Pütz	6–3, 6–3
Win	4–0	Sep 2021	ITF Rakovník, Czech Republic	Grade 2	Clay	(Russia) Elena Pridankina	(Italy) Virginia Ferrara (Italy) Giorgia Pedone	6–3, 6–3
Win	5–0	Mar 2022	ITF Benicarló, Spain	Grade 2	Clay	(Ukraine) Daria Yesypchuk	(Germany) Joëlle Steur (Germany) Marie Vogt	7–5, 6–4
Loss	5–1	Aug 2022	ITF Prague, Czech Republic	Grade 1	Clay	(Switzerland) Karolina Kozakova	(Czech Republic) Amélie Šmejkalová (Czech Republic) Tereza Valentová	4–6, 1–6

== Wins against top 10 players ==
- Bartůňková has a 3–5 record against players who were, at the time the match was played, ranked in the top 10.

No.	Player	Rk	Event	Surface	Rd	Score	Rk	Years	Ref
1	(Switzerland) Belinda Bencic	10	Australian Open, Australia	Hard	2R	6–3, 0–6, 6–4	126	2026	
2	Aryna Sabalenka	2	China Open, China	Hard	3R	6–4, 6–3	34	2026	
3	(Czech Republic) Karolína Muchová	8	China Open, China	Hard	QF	6–3, 6–0	34	2026	

- Key: (Rk) first use, opponent rank; (Rd) round; (Rk) 2nd use, player rank; (Ref) reference; (F) final; (SF) semifinal; (QF) quarterfinal; (#R) rounds 4, 3, 2, 1; (RR) round-robin stage; (Q#) qualifying rounds or stages (3), 2, 1.
