= 2026 Monastir Open II – Singles =

Singles
- 2026 Monastir Open II

Events
| Singles | Doubles |
- Monastir Open

Kilian Feldbausch was the defending champion but chose not to defend his title.

== Seeds ==
1. (Belgium) Kimmer Coppejans
2. (Italy) Filippo Romano
3. Petr Bar Biryukov
4. (Italy) Lorenzo Giustino
5. (Austria) Sandro Kopp
6. (United States) Dali Blanch
7. (Italy) Federico Bondioli
8. (Ivory Coast) Eliakim Coulibaly

== Draw ==
Key

- Q = Qualifier
- WC = Wild card
- LL = Lucky loser
- Alt = Alternate
- ITF = ITF entry
- PR = Protected ranking
- SR = Special ranking
- SE = Special exempt
- JE = Junior exempt
- JR = Junior Accelerator Programme entrant
- CO = College Accelerator Programme entrant
- NG = Next Gen Accelerator Program entrant
- w/o = Walkover
- r = Retired
- d = Defaulted

=== Finals ===
Semifinals

Final

=== Top half ===
First round
1 | (Belgium) K Coppejans
Q
(Serbia) B Đurić
Q
(Tunisia) A Ouakaa
WC | (Sweden) L Borg
(Iran) Kasra Rahmani
6 | (United States) Dali Blanch
4 | (Italy) L Giustino
WC | (Italy) Giulio Perego
(Spain) P Vives Marcos
(Algeria) Toufik Sahtali
(Latvia) R Strombachs
(Portugal) T Pereira
(France) G Debru
5 | (Austria) S Kopp

Second round
(Italy)

Quarterfinals

Semifinals

=== Bottom half ===
First round
7 | (Italy) F Bondioli
Alt | (Switzerland) Nicolás Parizzia
Q
WC | (Tunisia) Wissam Abderrahman
Semen Pankin
(Germany) Nikolai Barsukov
Q
3 | P Bar Biryukov
8 | (Ivory Coast) E Coulibaly
(Croatia) D Ajduković
Q
Q
(Germany) Yannik Kelm
(Spain) C Taberner
Q
2 | (Italy) F Romano

Second round

Quarterfinals

Semifinals
