= 2026 Monastir Open – Doubles =

Doubles
- 2026 Monastir Open

Final
- Champions: (Czech Republic) Filip Duda (Portugal) Tiago Pereira
- Runners-up: (United Kingdom) James MacKinlay (India) Jeevan Nedunchezhiyan
- Score: 7–6^{(7–1)}, 7–6^{(7–2)}

Events
Singles	Doubles
- Monastir Open

Corentin Denolly and Max Westphal were the defending champions but chose not to defend their title.

Filip Duda and Tiago Pereira won the title after defeating James MacKinlay and Jeevan Nedunchezhiyan 7–6^{(7–1)}, 7–6^{(7–2)} in the final.

== Seeds ==
1. (Czech Republic) Filip Duda / (Portugal) Tiago Pereira (champions)
2. (United Kingdom) James MacKinlay / (India) Jeevan Nedunchezhiyan (final)
3. Semen Pankin / (Italy) Giulio Perego (semifinals)
4. (Poland) Piotr Pawlak / (United Kingdom) Marcus Walters (first round)

== Draw ==
Key

- Q = Qualifier
- WC = Wild card
- LL = Lucky loser
- Alt = Alternate
- ITF = ITF entry
- PR = Protected ranking
- SR = Special ranking
- SE = Special exempt
- JE = Junior exempt
- JR = Junior Accelerator Programme entrant
- CO = College Accelerator Programme entrant
- NG = Next Gen Accelerator Program entrant
- w/o = Walkover
- r = Retired
- d = Defaulted

First round
(Germany) Nikolai Barsukov (Germany) Nino Ehrenschneider	4	2
(France) Guillaume Dalmasso (Algeria) Toufik Sahtali	6	6
(Germany) Yannik Kelm (Germany) Mika Petkovic	7	4	[10]
(Tunisia) Adam Nagoudi (Iran) Kasra Rahmani	5	6	[8]
(Ivory Coast) E Coulibaly (Ghana) I Nortey	6	1	[7]
(Zimbabwe) B Lock (Zimbabwe) CJ Lock	4	6	[10]
(Netherlands) Brian Bozemoj (Netherlands) Stijn Pel	7^{7}	6
4	(Poland) Piotr Pawlak (United Kingdom) Marcus Walters	6^{2}	2
(Spain) John Echeverría (Spain) P Vives Marcos	6^{6}	7^{7}	[12]
(United States) Dali Blanch (Tunisia) A Ouakaa	7^{8}	6^{1}	[10]

Quarterfinals
1	(Czech Republic) F Duda (Portugal) T Pereira	6	4	[10]
(France) G Dalmasso (Algeria) T Sahtali	1	6	[3]
3	Semen Pankin (Italy) Giulio Perego	6	6
(Germany) Y Kelm (Germany) M Petkovic	3	2
(Zimbabwe) B Lock (Zimbabwe) CJ Lock	7^{7}	6
(Netherlands) B Bozemoj (Netherlands) S Pel	6^{3}	2
(Spain) J Echeverría (Spain) P Vives Marcos
2	(United Kingdom) J MacKinlay (India) J Nedunchezhiyan	w/o

Semifinals
1	(Czech Republic) F Duda (Portugal) T Pereira	6	5	[10]
3	S Pankin (Italy) G Perego	4	7	[3]
(Zimbabwe) B Lock (Zimbabwe) CJ Lock	3	6^{4}
2	(United Kingdom) J MacKinlay (India) J Nedunchezhiyan	6	7^{7}

Final
1	(Czech Republic) F Duda (Portugal) T Pereira	7^{7}	7^{7}
2	(United Kingdom) J MacKinlay (India) J Nedunchezhiyan	6^{1}	6^{2}
