= 2026 Ethias Province Open – Doubles =

Doubles
- 2026 Ethias Province Open

Final
- Champions: Sergey Betov (Chinese Taipei) Jeffrey Hsu
- Runners-up: (Belgium) Émilien Demanet (Belgium) Niels Ratiu
- Score: 7–6^{(7–3)}, 5–7, [13–11]

Events
Singles	Doubles
- Ethias Province Open

This was the first edition of the tournament.

Sergey Betov and Jeffrey Hsu won the title after defeating Émilien Demanet and Niels Ratiu 7–6^{(7–3)}, 5–7, [13–11] in the final.

== Seeds ==
1. (Bulgaria) Anthony Genov / (Germany) Kai Wehnelt (first round)
2. Sergey Betov / (Chinese Taipei) Jeffrey Hsu (champions)
3. (France) Geoffrey Blancaneaux / (France) Matteo Martineau (withdrew)
4. (Poland) Piotr Pawlak / (Argentina) Franco Ribero (first round)

== Draw ==
Key

- Q = Qualifier
- WC = Wild card
- LL = Lucky loser
- Alt = Alternate
- ITF = ITF entry
- PR = Protected ranking
- SR = Special ranking
- SE = Special exempt
- JE = Junior exempt
- JR = Junior Accelerator Programme entrant
- CO = College Accelerator Programme entrant
- NG = Next Gen Accelerator Program entrant
- w/o = Walkover
- r = Retired
- d = Defaulted

First round
1	(Bulgaria) A Genov (Germany) K Wehnelt	6^{6}	6	[6]
(Netherlands) M Hermans (Netherlands) Ryan Nijboer	7^{8}	4	[10]
(Japan) Yuichiro Inui (Japan) Tomohiro Masabayashi	3	3
(Chinese Taipei) T-h Huang (China) B Zheng	6	6
Alt	(India) M Dhamne (Iran) Kasra Rahmani	2	6^{5}
(Georgia (country)) S Purtseladze (Germany) Niklas Schell	6	7^{7}
(South Africa) P Henning (Zimbabwe) CJ Lock	6	3	[6]
WC	(Belgium) Émilien Demanet (Belgium) Niels Ratiu	3	6	[10]
(France) M Chazal (Belgium) Jack Logé	6	6
(Sweden) Oliver Johansson (Ukraine) V Uzhylovskyi	3	3
(Belgium) Nicolas Ifi (Germany) Cedric Stanke	7	7^{7}
4	(Poland) Piotr Pawlak (Argentina) F Ribero	5	6^{5}
WC	(Belgium) David Tixhon (France) Édouard Villoslada	4	2
(India) Madhwin Kamath (India) Atharva Sharma	6	6
PR	(Australia) J Taylor (United States) Jack Vance	4	2
2	S Betov (Chinese Taipei) J Hsu	6	6

Quarterfinals
(Netherlands) M Hermans (Netherlands) R Nijboer	6	6^{7}	[14]
(Chinese Taipei) T-h Huang (China) B Zheng	1	7^{9}	[12]
(Georgia (country)) S Purtseladze (Germany) N Schell	2	5
WC	(Belgium) É Demanet (Belgium) N Ratiu	6	7
(France) M Chazal (Belgium) J Logé	6^{5}	4
(Belgium) N Ifi (Germany) C Stanke	7^{7}	6
(India) M Kamath (India) A Sharma	3	5
2	S Betov (Chinese Taipei) J Hsu	6	7

Semifinals
(Netherlands) M Hermans (Netherlands) R Nijboer	6	3	[10]
WC	(Belgium) É Demanet (Belgium) N Ratiu	1	6	[12]
(Belgium) N Ifi (Germany) C Stanke	6	3	[11]
2	S Betov (Chinese Taipei) J Hsu	1	6	[13]

Final
WC	(Belgium) É Demanet (Belgium) N Ratiu	6^{3}	7	[11]
2	S Betov (Chinese Taipei) J Hsu	7^{7}	5	[13]
