= 2026 Ethias Province Open =

- Date: 6 – 12 July
- Edition: 1st
- Surface: Clay
- Location: Liège, Belgium

Champions

Singles
- (Germany) Florian Broska

Doubles
- Sergey Betov / (Chinese Taipei) Jeffrey Hsu
- Ethias Province Open

The 2026 Ethias Province Open was a professional tennis tournament played on clay courts. It was the first edition of the tournament which was part of the 2026 ATP Challenger Tour. It took place in Liège, Belgium between 6 and 12 July 2026.

== Singles main-draw entrants ==
=== Seeds ===
Country	Player	Rank^{1}	Seed
BEL	Gauthier Onclin	178	1
BEL	Gilles-Arnaud Bailly	210	2
BEL	Kimmer Coppejans	222	3
ITA	Lorenzo Giustino	226	4
NED	Guy den Ouden	244	5
RSA	Philip Henning	254	6
BEL	Buvaysar Gadamauri	255	7
CZE	Hynek Bartoň	256	8

- ^{1} Rankings are as of 29 June 2026.

=== Other entrants ===
The following players received wildcards into the singles main draw:

- (Argentina) Federico Coria
- (Belgium) Émilien Demanet
- (Belgium) Harold Huens

The following player received entry into the singles main draw through the Junior Accelerator programme:

- (Spain) Andrés Santamarta Roig

The following players received entry into the singles main draw as alternates:

- (France) Maxime Chazal
- (Belgium) Jack Logé

The following players received entry from the qualifying draw:

- (South Korea) Gerard Campaña Lee
- (Chinese Taipei) Huang Tsung-hao
- (Netherlands) Ryan Nijboer
- (France) Leo Raquillet
- (Switzerland) Luca Stäheli
- (Germany) Kai Wehnelt

== Champions ==
=== Singles ===
- (Germany) Florian Broska def. (Italy) Lorenzo Giustino 6–7^{(4–7)}, 6–4, 6–1.

=== Doubles ===
- Sergey Betov / (Chinese Taipei) Jeffrey Hsu def. (Belgium) Émilien Demanet / (Belgium) Niels Ratiu 7–6^{(7–3)}, 5–7, [13–11].
