= 2026 Monastir Open – Singles =

Singles
- 2026 Monastir Open

Final
- Champion: (Switzerland) Kilian Feldbausch
- Runner-up: (Germany) Marvin Möller
- Score: 6–1, 6–2

Events
Singles	Doubles
- Monastir Open

Lorenzo Giustino was the defending champion but lost in the quarterfinals to Marvin Möller.

Kilian Feldbausch won the title after defeating Möller 6–1, 6–2 in the final.

== Seeds ==
1. (France) Moïse Kouamé (second round)
2. (Italy) Gianluca Cadenasso (first round)
3. (Germany) Marvin Möller (final)
4. (Spain) Alejandro Moro Cañas (quarterfinals)
5. (United Kingdom) Jay Clarke (second round)
6. (Croatia) Luka Mikrut (quarterfinals)
7. (Switzerland) Kilian Feldbausch (champion)
8. (Italy) Lorenzo Giustino (quarterfinals)

== Draw ==
Key

- Q = Qualifier
- WC = Wild card
- LL = Lucky loser
- Alt = Alternate
- ITF = ITF entry
- PR = Protected ranking
- SR = Special ranking
- SE = Special exempt
- JE = Junior exempt
- JR = Junior Accelerator Programme entrant
- CO = College Accelerator Programme entrant
- NG = Next Gen Accelerator Program entrant
- w/o = Walkover
- r = Retired
- d = Defaulted

=== Finals ===
Semifinals
(Czech Republic) Jonáš Forejtek	6^{1}	1
3	(Germany) Marvin Möller	7^{7}	6
Q	(Spain) Pedro Vives Marcos	3	2
7	(Switzerland) Kilian Feldbausch	6	6

Final
3	(Germany) Marvin Möller	1	2
7	(Switzerland) Kilian Feldbausch	6	6

=== Top half ===
First round
1	(France) M Kouamé	6	6
(Latvia) R Strombachs	3	4
(Italy) F Bondioli	3	6^{5}
(Czech Republic) J Forejtek	6	7^{7}
(Turkey) Mert Alkaya	6^{6}	3
(Ivory Coast) E Coulibaly	7^{8}	6
(Austria) S Kopp	6	3	3
6	(Croatia) L Mikrut	3	6	6
3	(Germany) M Möller	6	2	6
Q	(Germany) Nikolai Barsukov	2	6	4
Q	(Spain) John Echeverría	6	4	1
WC	(Tunisia) A Ouakaa	3	6	6
(United States) Dali Blanch	6	4	6
(Germany) M Topo	3	6	1
Q	(France) Nicolas Tepmahc	4	3
8	(Italy) L Giustino	6	6

Second round
1	(France) M Kouamé	4	6	4
(Czech Republic) J Forejtek	6	4	6
(Ivory Coast) E Coulibaly	5	4
6	(Croatia) L Mikrut	7	6
3	(Germany) M Möller	4	6	7^{7}
WC	(Tunisia) A Ouakaa	6	2	6^{2}
(United States) Dal Blanch	3	4
8	(Italy) L Giustino	6	6

Quarterfinals
(Czech Republic) J Forejtek	7^{7}	6
6	(Croatia) L Mikrut	6^{5}	4
3	(Germany) M Möller	6	4	6
8	(Italy) L Giustino	2	6	2

Semifinals
(Czech Republic) J Forejtek	6^{1}	1
3	(Germany) M Möller	7^{7}	6

=== Bottom half ===
First round
5	(United Kingdom) J Clarke	6^{7}	7^{7}	6
Q	(France) M Janvier	7^{9}	6^{3}	4
(India) M Dhamne	3	6	3
Q	(Spain) P Vives Marcos	6	3	6
WC	(Spain) Bernardo Munk Mesa	3	2
(Tunisia) A Dougaz	6	6
WC	(Iran) Kasra Rahmani	1	4
4	(Spain) A Moro Cañas	6	6
7	(Switzerland) K Feldbausch	3	6	7
(Portugal) T Pereira	6	4	5
PR	(France) G Debru	5	6^{8}
Q	(France) Maé Malige	7	7^{10}
(Croatia) D Ajduković	3	4
(Tunisia) M Echargui	6	6
(Germany) Mika Petkovic	7^{8}	6
2	(Italy) G Cadenasso	6^{6}	2

Second round
5	(United Kingdom) J Clarke	3	2
Q	(Spain) P Vives Marcos	6	6
(Tunisia) A Dougaz	0	3
4	(Spain) A Moro Cañas	6	6
7	(Switzerland) K Feldbausch	5	7	6
Q	(France) M Malige	7	5	2
(Tunisia) M Echargui	5	6^{8}
(Germany) M Petkovic	7	7^{10}

Quarterfinals
Q	(Spain) P Vives Marcos	7^{7}	6
4	(Spain) A Moro Cañas	6^{5}	4
7	(Switzerland) K Feldbausch	7	6
(Germany) M Petkovic	5	3

Semifinals
Q	(Spain) P Vives Marcos	3	2
7	(Switzerland) K Feldbausch	6	6
