= 2026 Monastir Open II – Doubles =

Doubles
- 2026 Monastir Open II

Events
Singles	Doubles
- Monastir Open

Filip Duda and Tiago Pereira were the defending champions but only Pereira chose to defend his title, partnering Admir Kalender.

== Seeds ==
1. (Croatia) Admir Kalender / (Portugal) Tiago Pereira
2. (Tunisia) Skander Mansouri / (Austria) Maximilian Neuchrist
3. (Venezuela) Luis David Martínez / (India) Jeevan Nedunchezhiyan
4. (Spain) Alberto Barroso Campos / (Spain) Ignasi Forcano

== Draw ==
Key

- Q = Qualifier
- WC = Wild card
- LL = Lucky loser
- Alt = Alternate
- ITF = ITF entry
- PR = Protected ranking
- SR = Special ranking
- SE = Special exempt
- JE = Junior exempt
- JR = Junior Accelerator Programme entrant
- CO = College Accelerator Programme entrant
- NG = Next Gen Accelerator Program entrant
- w/o = Walkover
- r = Retired
- d = Defaulted

First round
1	(Croatia) A Kalender (Portugal) T Pereira
(France) Marko Marić (France) Mathieu Scaglia
P Bar Biryukov; Semen Pankin
(Zimbabwe) CJ Lock (Algeria) Toufik Sahtali
3	(Venezuela) LD Martínez (India) J Nedunchezhiyan
(Germany) Yannik Kelm (Germany) Niklas Schell
WC	(Algeria) Samir Hamza Reguig (Morocco) Yassine Smiej
WC	(Tunisia) Wissam Abderrahman (Tunisia) A Ouakaa
(Switzerland) Adrien Burdet (Switzerland) Nicolás Parizzia
(Tunisia) Adam Nagoudi (Iran) Kasra Rahmani
(France) G Debru (Spain) P Vives Marcos
4	(Spain) A Barroso Campos (Spain) Ignasi Forcano
(Ivory Coast) E Coulibaly (France) Valentin de Carvalho
(Italy) Simone Agostini (Italy) Riccardo Perin
(Italy) Federico Iannaccone (Italy) F Romano
2	(Tunisia) S Mansouri (Austria) M Neuchrist

Quarterfinals
WC
(Spain)

Semifinals

Final
