= 2026 Ethias Province Open – Singles =

Singles
- 2026 Ethias Province Open

Final
- Champion: (Germany) Florian Broska
- Runner-up: (Italy) Lorenzo Giustino
- Score: 6–7^{(4–7)}, 6–4, 6–1

Events
Singles	Doubles
- Ethias Province Open

This was the first edition of the tournament.

Florian Broska won the title after defeating Lorenzo Giustino 6–7^{(4–7)}, 6–4, 6–1 in the final.

== Seeds ==
1. (Belgium) Gauthier Onclin (second round)
2. (Belgium) Gilles-Arnaud Bailly (second round)
3. (Belgium) Kimmer Coppejans (semifinals)
4. (Italy) Lorenzo Giustino (final)
5. (Netherlands) Guy den Ouden (quarterfinals)
6. (South Africa) Philip Henning (second round)
7. (Belgium) Buvaysar Gadamauri (first round, retired)
8. (Czech Republic) Hynek Bartoň (first round)

== Draw ==
Key

- Q = Qualifier
- WC = Wild card
- LL = Lucky loser
- Alt = Alternate
- ITF = ITF entry
- PR = Protected ranking
- SR = Special ranking
- SE = Special exempt
- JE = Junior exempt
- JR = Junior Accelerator Programme entrant
- CO = College Accelerator Programme entrant
- NG = Next Gen Accelerator Program entrant
- w/o = Walkover
- r = Retired
- d = Defaulted

=== Finals ===
Semifinals
(Germany) Florian Broska	6	6
3	(Belgium) Kimmer Coppejans	3	2
4	(Italy) Lorenzo Giustino	7^{7}	6
(Spain) Miguel Damas	6^{3}	3

Final
(Germany) Florian Broska	6^{4}	6	6
4	(Italy) Lorenzo Giustino	7^{7}	4	1

=== Top half ===
First round
1	(Belgium) G Onclin	4	6	6
Q	(South Korea) G Campaña Lee	6	2	2
(Germany) F Broska	6	6
Q	(Germany) K Wehnelt	2	3
(France) F Balshaw	6	7
(Spain) C Sánchez Jover	2	5
(France) M Martineau	3	2
6	(South Africa) P Henning	6	6
3	(Belgium) K Coppejans	6	6
Q	(Netherlands) Ryan Nijboer	3	1
(Brazil) P Boscardin Dias	2	1
(Poland) D Michalski	6	6
WC	(Argentina) F Coria	7^{7}	1
(France) G Blancaneaux	6^{4}	0^{r}
Q	(Chinese Taipei) T-h Huang	2	2
5	(Netherlands) G den Ouden	6	6

Second round
1	(Belgium) G Onclin	7	6^{5}	2
(Germany) F Broska	5	7^{7}	6
(France) F Balshaw	6	6
6	(South Africa) P Henning	0	2
3	(Belgium) K Coppejans	6	7
(Poland) D Michalski	4	5
WC	(Argentina) F Coria	6	2	3
5	(Netherlands) G den Ouden	2	6	6

Quarterfinals
(Germany) F Broska	7^{7}	6
(France) F Balshaw	6^{4}	4
3	(Belgium) K Coppejans	6	6
5	(Netherlands) G den Ouden	3	3

Semifinals
(Germany) F Broska	6	6
3	(Belgium) K Coppejans	3	2

=== Bottom half ===
First round
7	(Belgium) B Gadamauri	6	1^{r}
Q	(Switzerland) Luca Stäheli	1	4
(Italy) F Forti	6	3	6^{5}
Alt	(Belgium) Jack Logé	4	6	7^{7}
Alt	(France) M Chazal	2	3
WC	(Belgium) Émilien Demanet	6	6
Q	(France) Leo Raquillet	3	6	2
4	(Italy) L Giustino	6	4	6
8	(Czech Republic) H Bartoň	4	2
(Austria) S Kopp	6	6
(Uzbekistan) S Fomin	3	6	4
(India) M Dhamne	6	4	6
(Spain) M Damas	6	6
WC	(Belgium) Harold Huens	0	4
JR	(Spain) A Santamarta Roig	7	4	5
2	(Belgium) GA Bailly	5	6	7

Second round
Q	(Switzerland) L Stäheli	6^{5}	6	2
Alt	(Belgium) J Logé	7^{7}	3	6
WC	(Belgium) É Demanet	3	4
4	(Italy) L Giustino	6	6
(Austria) S Kopp	6^{4}	6^{5}
(India) M Dhamne	7^{7}	7^{7}
(Spain) M Damas	7	2	6
2	(Belgium) GA Bailly	5	6	2

Quarterfinals
Alt	(Belgium) J Logé	5	4
4	(Italy) L Giustino	7	6
(India) M Dhamne	1	6^{6}
(Spain) M Damas	6	7^{8}

Semifinals
4	(Italy) L Giustino	7^{7}	6
(Spain) M Damas	6^{3}	3
