= 2025 Monastir Open =

- Date: 27 October – 2 November
- Edition: 1st
- Surface: Hard
- Location: Monastir, Tunisia

Champions

Singles
- (Italy) Lorenzo Giustino

Doubles
- (France) Corentin Denolly / (France) Max Westphal
- Monastir Open

The 2025 Monastir Open was a professional tennis tournament played on hardcourts. It was the first edition of the tournament which was part of the 2025 ATP Challenger Tour. It took place in Monastir, Tunisia between 27 October and 2 November 2025.

== Singles main-draw entrants ==
=== Seeds ===
Country	Player	Rank^{1}	Seed
CRO	Luka Mikrut	160	1
BEL	Kimmer Coppejans	183	2
BEL	Gauthier Onclin	205	3
GBR	George Loffhagen	215	4
FRA	Dan Added	217	5
FRA	Arthur Géa	236	6
	Ilia Simakin	254	7
ESP	Alejandro Moro Cañas	256	8

- ^{1} Rankings are as of 20 October 2025.

=== Other entrants ===
The following players received wildcards into the singles main draw:

- (Tunisia) Anas Bennour Dit Sahli
- (Tunisia) Aziz Ouakaa
- (Greece) Ioannis Xilas

The following players received entry into the singles main draw using protected rankings:

- (Bulgaria) Adrian Andreev
- (Italy) Francesco Forti

The following player received entry into the singles main draw through the Junior Accelerator programme:

- (Czech Republic) Jan Kumstát

The following player received entry into the singles main draw through the Next Gen Accelerator programme:

- (Czech Republic) Petr Brunclík

The following player received entry into the singles main draw as an alternate:

- (Germany) Christoph Negritu

The following players received entry from the qualifying draw:

- (Moldova) Radu Albot
- (Turkey) Mert Alkaya
- (Spain) Sergio Callejón Hernando
- (Italy) Lorenzo Carboni
- (United Kingdom) Giles Hussey
- (Spain) Pedro Vives Marcos

== Champions ==
=== Singles ===
- (Italy) Lorenzo Giustino def. (Czech Republic) Petr Brunclík 7–5, 6–0.

=== Doubles ===
- (France) Corentin Denolly / (France) Max Westphal def. (Serbia) Stefan Latinović / (Croatia) Luka Mikrut 7–5, 2–6, [10–6].
