= 2025 Monastir Open – Singles =

Singles
- 2025 Monastir Open

Final
- Champion: (Italy) Lorenzo Giustino
- Runner-up: (Czech Republic) Petr Brunclík
- Score: 7–5, 6–0

Events
Singles	Doubles
- Monastir Open

This was the first edition of the tournament.

Lorenzo Giustino won the title after defeating Petr Brunclík 7–5, 6–0 in the final.

== Seeds ==
1. (Croatia) Luka Mikrut (quarterfinals)
2. (Belgium) Kimmer Coppejans (first round)
3. (Belgium) Gauthier Onclin (first round)
4. (United Kingdom) George Loffhagen (first round)
5. (France) Dan Added (quarterfinals)
6. (France) Arthur Géa (semifinals)
7. Ilia Simakin (second round)
8. (Spain) Alejandro Moro Cañas (semifinals)

== Draw ==
Key

- Q = Qualifier
- WC = Wild card
- LL = Lucky loser
- Alt = Alternate
- ITF = ITF entry
- PR = Protected ranking
- SR = Special ranking
- SE = Special exempt
- JE = Junior exempt
- JR = Junior Accelerator Programme entrant
- CO = College Accelerator Programme entrant
- NG = Next Gen Accelerator Program entrant
- w/o = Walkover
- r = Retired
- d = Defaulted

=== Finals ===
Semifinals
8	(Spain) Alejandro Moro Cañas	6^{3}	6^{5}
(Italy) Lorenzo Giustino	7^{7}	7^{7}
6	(France) Arthur Géa	6^{1}	2
NG	(Czech Republic) Petr Brunclík	7^{7}	6

Final
(Italy) Lorenzo Giustino	7	6
NG	(Czech Republic) Petr Brunclík	5	0

=== Top half ===
First round
1	(Croatia) L Mikrut	6	6
(France) C Denolly	0	1
(France) R Bertrand	6^{2}	3
Alt	(Germany) C Negritu	7^{7}	6
PR	(Bulgaria) A Andreev	6^{11}	6	6
(France) C Tabur	7^{13}	3	4
Q	(United Kingdom) G Hussey	4	5
8	(Spain) A Moro Cañas	6	7
4	(United Kingdom) G Loffhagen	4	4
(Italy) L Giustino	6	6
Q	(Moldova) R Albot	6^{5}	4
WC	(Greece) Ioannis Xilas	7^{7}	6
(Portugal) T Pereira	2	3
Q	(Spain) P Vives Marcos	6	6
(France) Mathys Erhard	5	4
5	(France) D Added	7	6

Second round
1	(Croatia) L Mikrut	5	6	7
Alt	(Germany) C Negritu	7	4	5
PR	(Bulgaria) A Andreev	2	1
8	(Spain) A Moro Cañas	6	6
(Italy) L Giustino	6	6
WC	(Greece) I Xilas	4	1
Q	(Spain) P Vives Marcos	4	4
5	(France) D Added	6	6

Quarterfinals
1	(Croatia) L Mikrut	6^{8}	7^{7}	4
8	(Spain) A Moro Cañas	7^{10}	6^{3}	6
(Italy) L Giustino	6	6
5	(France) D Added	3	4

Semifinals
8	(Spain) A Moro Cañas	6^{3}	6^{5}
(Italy) L Giustino	7^{7}	7^{7}

=== Bottom half ===
First round
6	(France) A Géa	7	7^{7}
Q	(Italy) Lorenzo Carboni	5	6^{4}
WC	(Tunisia) A Ouakaa	6	2	3
JR	(Czech Republic) J Kumstát	2	6	6
PR	(Italy) F Forti	4	7^{7}	5
(Switzerland) R Bertola	6	6^{2}	7
Q	(Spain) Sergio Callejón Hernando	6	6
3	(Belgium) G Onclin	3	3
7	I Simakin	6	6
(Netherlands) M Houkes	2	3
NG	(Czech Republic) Petr Brunclík	7^{7}	6
(France) M Martineau	6^{5}	3
WC	(Tunisia) Anas Bennour Dit Sahli	2	0
(Ivory Coast) E Coulibaly	6	6
Q	(Turkey) Mert Alkaya	4	6	6
2	(Belgium) K Coppejans	6	3	3

Second round
6	(France) A Géa	6	6
JR	(Czech Republic) J Kumstát	3	4
(Switzerland) R Bertola	6	6
Q	(Spain) S Callejón Hernando	4	3
7	I Simakin	4	4
NG	(Czech Republic) P Brunclík	6	6
(Ivory Coast) E Coulibaly	1	6	2
Q	(Turkey) M Alkaya	6	1	6

Quarterfinals
6	(France) A Géa	7^{7}	6
(Switzerland) R Bertola	6^{4}	1
NG	(Czech Republic) P Brunclík	7	6
Q	(Turkey) M Alkaya	5	3

Semifinals
6	(France) A Géa	6^{1}	2
NG	(Czech Republic) P Brunclík	7^{7}	6
