= 2025 Monastir Open – Doubles =

Doubles
- 2025 Monastir Open

Final
- Champions: (France) Corentin Denolly (France) Max Westphal
- Runners-up: (Serbia) Stefan Latinović (Croatia) Luka Mikrut
- Score: 7–5, 2–6, [10–6]

Events
Singles	Doubles
- Monastir Open

This was the first edition of the tournament.

Corentin Denolly and Max Westphal won the title after defeating Stefan Latinović and Luka Mikrut 7–5, 2–6, [10–6] in the final.

== Seeds ==
1. (Peru) Alexander Merino / (Germany) Christoph Negritu (first round)
2. (Czech Republic) Jan Jermář / (Portugal) Tiago Pereira (quarterfinals)
3. (Serbia) Stefan Latinović / (Croatia) Luka Mikrut (final)
4. (United Kingdom) Scott Duncan / (United Kingdom) James MacKinlay (quarterfinals)

== Draw ==
Key

- Q = Qualifier
- WC = Wild card
- LL = Lucky loser
- Alt = Alternate
- ITF = ITF entry
- PR = Protected ranking
- SR = Special ranking
- SE = Special exempt
- JE = Junior exempt
- JR = Junior Accelerator Programme entrant
- CO = College Accelerator Programme entrant
- NG = Next Gen Accelerator Program entrant
- w/o = Walkover
- r = Retired
- d = Defaulted

=== Draw ===
First round
1	(Peru) A Merino (Germany) C Negritu	3	4
(United Kingdom) G Hussey (Spain) P Vives Marcos	6	6
(France) R Bertrand (India) A Kalyanpur	2	6	[7]
I Simakin; Pavel Verbin	6	4	[10]
3	(Serbia) S Latinović (Croatia) L Mikrut	7^{9}	6
Alt	(United States) Dali Blanch (Poland) Olaf Pieczkowski	6^{7}	4
WC	(Tunisia) Adam Nagoudi (Kazakhstan) A Omarkhanov	1	2
(Croatia) A Kalender (Croatia) N Serdarušić	6	6
Alt	(Ivory Coast) E Coulibaly (Ghana) I Nortey	6^{0}	7	[9]
(Bulgaria) A Genov (Tunisia) A Ouakaa	7^{7}	5	[11]
WC	(Tunisia) Anas Bennour Dit Sahli (Tunisia) Alaa Trifi	4	4
4	(United Kingdom) S Duncan (United Kingdom) J MacKinlay	6	6
PR	(Italy) Lorenzo Carboni (Italy) F Forti	6^{2}	2
(France) C Denolly (France) M Westphal	7^{7}	6
(Italy) Simone Agostini (Canada) K Stevenson	3	2
2	(Czech Republic) J Jermář (Portugal) T Pereira	6	6

Quarterfinals
(United Kingdom) G Hussey (Spain) P Vives Marcos	6	6^{5}	[10]
I Simakin; P Verbin	4	7^{7}	[3]
3	(Serbia) S Latinović (Croatia) L Mikrut	7^{7}	7^{7}
(Croatia) A Kalender (Croatia) N Serdarušić	6^{3}	6^{5}
(Bulgaria) A Genov (Tunisia) A Ouakaa	4	7	[10]
4	(United Kingdom) S Duncan (United Kingdom) J MacKinlay	6	5	[8]
(France) C Denolly (France) M Westphal	7^{7}	6^{4}	[10]
2	(Czech Republic) J Jermář (Portugal) T Pereira	6^{4}	7^{7}	[8]

Semifinals
(United Kingdom) G Hussey (Spain) P Vives Marcos	6^{3}	6^{3}
3	(Serbia) S Latinović (Croatia) L Mikrut	7^{7}	7^{7}
(Bulgaria) A Genov (Tunisia) A Ouakaa	5	4
(France) C Denolly (France) M Westphal	7	6

Final
3	(Serbia) S Latinović (Croatia) L Mikrut	5	6	[6]
(France) C Denolly (France) M Westphal	7	2	[10]
