= 2026 Monastir Open =

- Date: 9 – 15 November
- Edition: 2nd
- Surface: Hard
- Location: Monastir, Tunisia

Champions

Singles
- (Switzerland) Kilian Feldbausch

Doubles
- (Czech Republic) Filip Duda / (Portugal) Tiago Pereira
- Monastir Open

The 2026 Monastir Open was a professional tennis tournament played on hardcourts. It was the second edition of the tournament which was part of the 2026 ATP Challenger Tour. It took place in Monastir, Tunisia between 9 and 15 November 2026.

== Singles main-draw entrants ==
=== Seeds ===
Country	Player	Rank^{1}	Seed
FRA	Moïse Kouamé	132	1
ITA	Gianluca Cadenasso	215	2
GER	Marvin Möller	227	3
ESP	Alejandro Moro Cañas	238	4
GBR	Jay Clarke	241	5
CRO	Luka Mikrut	251	6
SUI	Kilian Feldbausch	262	7
ITA	Lorenzo Giustino	272	8

- ^{1} Rankings are as of 2 November 2026.

=== Other entrants ===
The following players received wildcards into the singles main draw:

- (Spain) Bernardo Munk Mesa
- (Tunisia) Aziz Ouakaa
- (Iran) Kasra Rahmani

The following player received entry into the singles main draw using a protected ranking:

- (France) Gabriel Debru

The following players received entry from the qualifying draw:

- (Germany) Nikolai Barsukov
- (Spain) John Echeverría
- (France) Maxime Janvier
- (France) Maé Malige
- (France) Nicolas Tepmahc
- (Spain) Pedro Vives Marcos

== Champions ==
=== Singles ===
- (Switzerland) Kilian Feldbausch def. (Germany) Marvin Möller 6–1, 6–2.

=== Doubles ===
- (Czech Republic) Filip Duda / (Portugal) Tiago Pereira def. (United Kingdom) James MacKinlay / (India) Jeevan Nedunchezhiyan 7–6^{(7–1)}, 7–6^{(7–2)}.
