= 2020 Australian Open =

2020 edition of the Australia Open tennis championships

- Date: 20 January – 2 February 2020
- Edition: 108th Open Era (52nd)
- Category: Grand Slam
- Draw: 128 singles players, 64 doubles pairs and 32 mixed doubles pairs
- Prize money: A$71,000,000
- Surface: Hard (Plexicushion)
- Location: Melbourne, Victoria, Australia
- Venue: Melbourne Park
- Attendance: 812,174

Champions

Men's singles
- (Serbia) Novak Djokovic

Women's singles
- (United States) Sofia Kenin

Men's doubles
- (United States) Rajeev Ram / (United Kingdom) Joe Salisbury

Women's doubles
- (Hungary) Tímea Babos / (France) Kristina Mladenovic

Mixed doubles
- (Czech Republic) Barbora Krejčíková / (Croatia) Nikola Mektić

Wheelchair men's singles
- (Japan) Shingo Kunieda

Wheelchair women's singles
- (Japan) Yui Kamiji

Wheelchair quad singles
- (Australia) Dylan Alcott

Wheelchair men's doubles
- (United Kingdom) Alfie Hewett / (United Kingdom) Gordon Reid

Wheelchair women's doubles
- (Japan) Yui Kamiji / (United Kingdom) Jordanne Whiley

Wheelchair quad doubles
- (Australia) Dylan Alcott / (Australia) Heath Davidson

Boys' singles
- (France) Harold Mayot

Girls' singles
- (Andorra) Victoria Jiménez Kasintseva

Boys' doubles
- (Romania) Nicholas David Ionel / (Switzerland) Leandro Riedi

Girls' doubles
- (Philippines) Alex Eala / (Indonesia) Priska Madelyn Nugroho
- Australian Open

The 2020 Australian Open was a Grand Slam tennis tournament that took place at Melbourne Park, from 20 January to 2 February 2020. It was the 108th edition of the Australian Open, the 52nd in the Open Era, and the first Grand Slam of the year. The tournament consisted of events for professional players in singles, doubles and mixed doubles. Junior and wheelchair players competed in singles and doubles tournaments.

Novak Djokovic and Naomi Osaka were the defending champions in Men's Singles and Women's Singles, respectively. Osaka lost in the third round to Coco Gauff. In contrast, Djokovic successfully defended his title by defeating Dominic Thiem to win the tournament for a record-extending eighth time.

Prior to this edition of the Australian Open, the supplier of the hard courts was changed to GreenSet, though the court surface and color remained the same. This is one of the few sporting events held in 2020 which was unaffected by the COVID-19 pandemic. The tournament had a record attendance of 812,174 spectators.

== Tournament ==
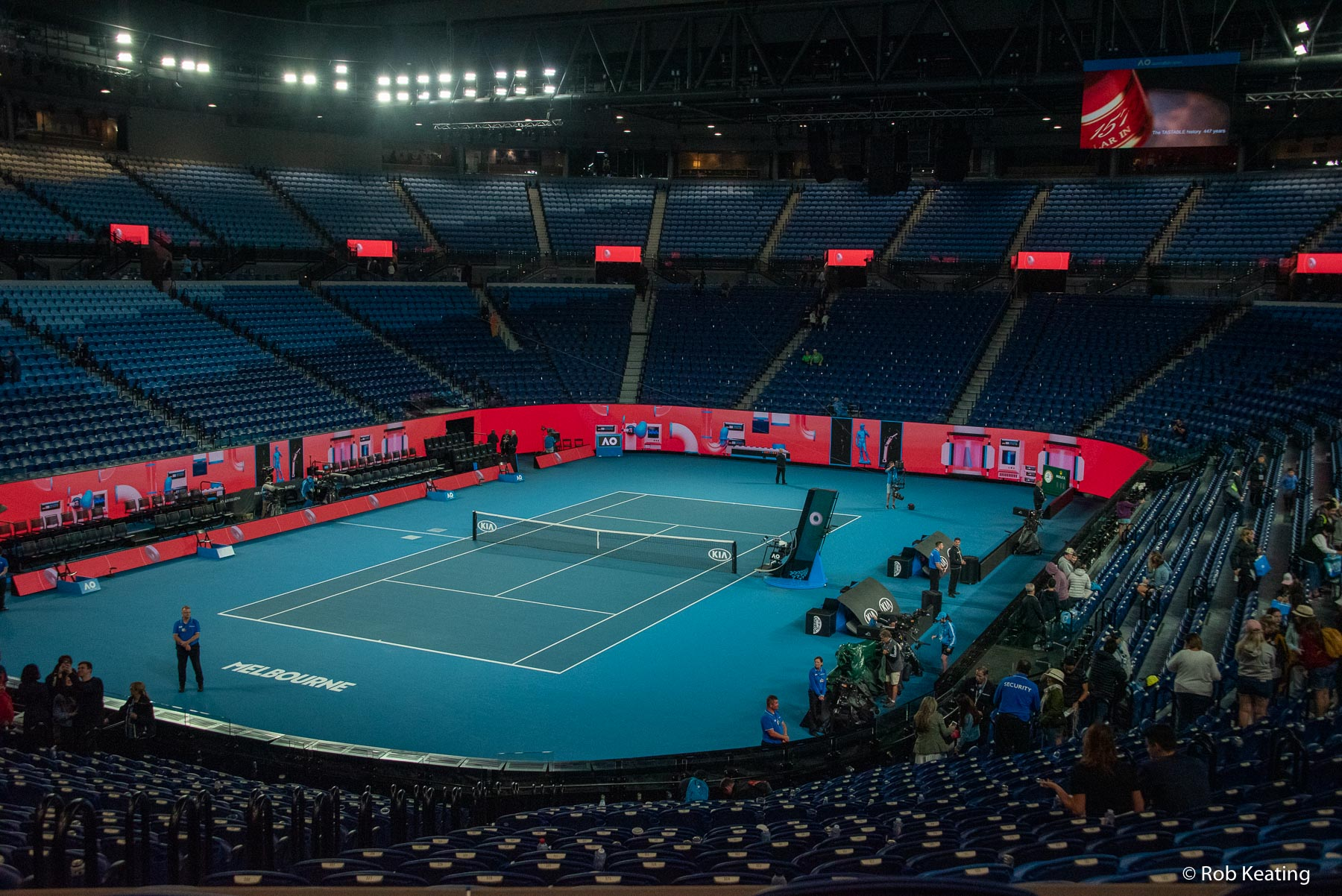
Rod Laver Arena, seen here in 2020, is the tournament's centre court and location of the finals.

The 2020 Australian Open was the 108th edition of the tournament, held at Melbourne Park in Melbourne, Victoria, Australia.

The tournament is run by the International Tennis Federation (ITF) and is part of the 2020 ATP Tour and the 2020 WTA Tour calendars under the Grand Slam category. The tournament consists of both men's and women's singles and doubles draws as well as the mixed doubles events. There are singles and doubles events for both boys and girls (players under 18), which are part of the Grade A category of tournaments. There are also singles, doubles and quad events for men's and women's wheelchair tennis players as part of the NEC tour under the Grand Slam category.

The tournament is played on hard courts and is taking place across a series of 25 courts, the three main show courts Rod Laver Arena, Melbourne Arena and Margaret Court Arena. 1573 Arena (formerly Show Court Two) was upgraded into a main show court.

=== Impact of bushfires ===
The bushfires that had burned large portions of Australia for months left a smoke haze over Melbourne on the first day of qualifying. That day, the air over Melbourne was rated as the worst in the world. In qualifying, play was delayed, some players called for medical timeouts, and Dalila Jakupović was forced to retire, due to a coughing fit brought on by the poor air quality.

The tournament held a Rally for Relief similar to the one of 2011 before the tournament to raise money to aid areas devastated by the bushfires. Novak Djokovic, Coco Gauff, Petra Kvitová, Rafael Nadal, Naomi Osaka, Dominic Thiem, Stefanos Tsitsipas, and Alexander Zverev all played a doubles format match with Serena Williams and Caroline Wozniacki as team captains. Roger Federer and Nick Kyrgios later played a one set singles match where Federer prevailed.

== Singles players ==
Men's singles

Men's singles players
Champion		Runner-up	
(Serbia) Novak Djokovic [2]		(Austria) Dominic Thiem [5]	
Semifinals out
(Germany) Alexander Zverev [7]		(Switzerland) Roger Federer [3]	
Quarterfinals out
(Spain) Rafael Nadal [1]	(Switzerland) Stan Wawrinka [15]	(United States) Tennys Sandgren	(Canada) Milos Raonic [32]
4th round out
(Australia) Nick Kyrgios [23]	(France) Gaël Monfils [10]	(Russia) Daniil Medvedev [4]	(Russia) Andrey Rublev [17]
(Italy) Fabio Fognini [12]	(Hungary) Márton Fucsovics	(Croatia) Marin Čilić	(Argentina) Diego Schwartzman [14]
3rd round out
(Spain) Pablo Carreño Busta [27]	(Russia) Karen Khachanov [16]	(Latvia) Ernests Gulbis (Q)	(United States) Taylor Fritz [29]
(Australia) Alexei Popyrin	(United States) John Isner [19]	(Belgium) David Goffin [11]	(Spain) Fernando Verdasco
(United States) Sam Querrey	(Argentina) Guido Pella [22]	(United States) Tommy Paul	(Australia) John Millman
(Greece) Stefanos Tsitsipas [6]	(Spain) Roberto Bautista Agut [9]	(Serbia) Dušan Lajović [24]	(Japan) Yoshihito Nishioka
2nd round out
(Argentina) Federico Delbonis	(Germany) Peter Gojowczyk (Q)	(France) Gilles Simon	(Sweden) Mikael Ymer
(Croatia) Ivo Karlović	(Slovenia) Aljaž Bedene	(South Africa) Kevin Anderson	(Australia) Alex Bolt (WC)
(Spain) Pedro Martínez (Q)	(Spain) Jaume Munar	(Chile) Alejandro Tabilo (Q)	(Italy) Andreas Seppi
(France) Pierre-Hugues Herbert	(Japan) Yūichi Sugita	(Georgia (country)) Nikoloz Basilashvili [26]	(Belarus) Egor Gerasimov
(Italy) Matteo Berrettini [8]	(Lithuania) Ričardas Berankis	(France) Grégoire Barrère	(Australia) Jordan Thompson
(Italy) Jannik Sinner	(Bulgaria) Grigor Dimitrov [18]	(Poland) Hubert Hurkacz [31]	(Serbia) Filip Krajinović
(Germany) Philipp Kohlschreiber	(Chile) Cristian Garín	(France) Benoît Paire [21]	(United States) Michael Mmoh (WC)
(Spain) Alejandro Davidovich Fokina	(Australia) Marc Polmans (WC)	(United Kingdom) Dan Evans [30]	(Japan) Tatsuma Ito (WC)
1st round out
(Bolivia) Hugo Dellien	(Portugal) João Sousa	(United States) Christopher Eubanks (Q)	(Slovakia) Jozef Kovalík (LL)
(Italy) Lorenzo Sonego	(Uruguay) Pablo Cuevas	(Japan) Yasutaka Uchiyama	(Spain) Mario Vilella Martínez (Q)
(Chinese Taipei) Lu Yen-hsun (PR)	(Canada) Vasek Pospisil (PR)	(Australia) James Duckworth	(Canada) Félix Auger-Aliassime [20]
(Netherlands) Tallon Griekspoor (Q)	(Belarus) Ilya Ivashka (Q)	(Spain) Albert Ramos Viñolas	(France) Adrian Mannarino
(United States) Frances Tiafoe	(Germany) Dominik Koepfer	(France) Hugo Gaston (WC)	(France) Jo-Wilfried Tsonga [28]
(Brazil) Thiago Monteiro	(Colombia) Daniel Elahi Galán (Q)	(Serbia) Miomir Kecmanović	(Bosnia and Herzegovina) Damir Džumhur
(France) Jérémy Chardy	(United Kingdom) Cameron Norrie	(France) Elliot Benchetrit (Q)	(Australia) Christopher O'Connell (WC)
(South Korea) Kwon Soon-woo	(Russia) Evgeny Donskoy (LL)	(Norway) Casper Ruud	(Italy) Marco Cecchinato
(Australia) Andrew Harris (WC)	(Argentina) Marco Trungelliti (Q)	(Spain) Roberto Carballés Baena	(Croatia) Borna Ćorić [25]
(Australia) John-Patrick Smith (WC)	(Egypt) Mohamed Safwat (Q)	(Kazakhstan) Alexander Bublik	(United States) Reilly Opelka
(Canada) Denis Shapovalov [13]	(Australia) Max Purcell (Q)	(Argentina) Leonardo Mayer	(Argentina) Juan Ignacio Londero
(Austria) Dennis Novak (Q)	(France) Ugo Humbert	(France) Quentin Halys (Q)	(United States) Steve Johnson
(Italy) Salvatore Caruso	(United States) Marcos Giron	(Italy) Stefano Travaglia	(Italy) Lorenzo Giustino (LL)
(Germany) Cedrik-Marcel Stebe (PR)	(France) Corentin Moutet	(Spain) Pablo Andújar	(Spain) Feliciano López
(South Africa) Lloyd Harris	(Slovakia) Norbert Gombos (Q)	(Kazakhstan) Mikhail Kukushkin	(United Kingdom) Kyle Edmund
(United States) Mackenzie McDonald (PR)	(Serbia) Laslo Đere	(India) Prajnesh Gunneswaran (LL)	(Germany) Jan-Lennard Struff

Women's singles

Women's singles players
Champion		Runner-up	
(United States) Sofia Kenin [14]		(Spain) Garbiñe Muguruza	
Semifinals out
(Australia) Ashleigh Barty [1]		(Romania) Simona Halep [4]	
Quarterfinals out
(Czech Republic) Petra Kvitová [7]	(Tunisia) Ons Jabeur	(Estonia) Anett Kontaveit [28]	(Russia) Anastasia Pavlyuchenkova [30]
4th round out
(United States) Alison Riske [18]	(Greece) Maria Sakkari [22]	(United States) Coco Gauff	(China) Wang Qiang [27]
(Poland) Iga Świątek	(Belgium) Elise Mertens [16]	(Netherlands) Kiki Bertens [9]	(Germany) Angelique Kerber [17]
3rd round out
(Kazakhstan) Elena Rybakina [29]	(Germany) Julia Görges	(United States) Madison Keys [10]	(Russia) Ekaterina Alexandrova [25]
(Japan) Naomi Osaka [3]	(China) Zhang Shuai	(Denmark) Caroline Wozniacki	(United States) Serena Williams [8]
(Switzerland) Belinda Bencic [6]	(Croatia) Donna Vekić [19]	(United States) Catherine Bellis (PR)	(Kazakhstan) Yulia Putintseva
(Ukraine) Elina Svitolina [5]	(Kazakhstan) Zarina Diyas	(Italy) Camila Giorgi	(Czech Republic) Karolína Plíšková [2]
2nd round out
(Slovenia) Polona Hercog	(Belgium) Greet Minnen (Q)	(China) Zhu Lin	(Croatia) Petra Martić [13]
(Netherlands) Arantxa Rus	(Japan) Nao Hibino (Q)	(Czech Republic) Barbora Krejčíková (Q)	(Spain) Paula Badosa
(China) Zheng Saisai	(Romania) Sorana Cîrstea	(United States) Caty McNally (Q)	(United States) Ann Li (Q)
(France) Caroline Garcia	(Ukraine) Dayana Yastremska [23]	(France) Fiona Ferro	(Slovenia) Tamara Zidanšek
(Latvia) Jeļena Ostapenko	(Spain) Sara Sorribes Tormo	(France) Alizé Cornet	(Spain) Carla Suárez Navarro
(United Kingdom) Heather Watson	(Czech Republic) Karolína Muchová [20]	(United States) Danielle Collins [26]	(United Kingdom) Harriet Dart (Q)
(United States) Lauren Davis	(Australia) Ajla Tomljanović	(Russia) Anna Blinkova	(Australia) Arina Rodionova (WC)
(Russia) Svetlana Kuznetsova	(Australia) Priscilla Hon (WC)	(United States) Taylor Townsend	(Germany) Laura Siegemund
1st round out
(Ukraine) Lesia Tsurenko	(Sweden) Rebecca Peterson	(Belarus) Aliaksandra Sasnovich	(United States) Bernarda Pera
(China) Wang Yafan	(Switzerland) Viktorija Golubic	(Slovakia) Viktória Kužmová	(United States) Christina McHale
(Russia) Daria Kasatkina	(Poland) Magda Linette	(China) Peng Shuai	(Russia) Margarita Gasparyan
(Switzerland) Jil Teichmann	(Estonia) Kaia Kanepi	(Sweden) Johanna Larsson (Q)	(Czech Republic) Kateřina Siniaková
(Czech Republic) Marie Bouzková	(Russia) Anna Kalinskaya (Q)	(United States) Venus Williams	(Czech Republic) Barbora Strýcová [32]
(United States) Sloane Stephens [24]	(Australia) Samantha Stosur	(Australia) Lizette Cabrera (WC)	(Italy) Martina Trevisan (Q)
(United Kingdom) Johanna Konta [12]	(United States) Madison Brengle	(United States) Kristie Ahn	(Slovenia) Kaja Juvan (Q)
(France) Pauline Parmentier (WC)	(Belgium) Alison Van Uytvanck	(South Korea) Han Na-lae (WC)	(Russia) Anastasia Potapova
(Slovakia) Anna Karolína Schmiedlová (PR)	(Russia) Liudmila Samsonova (Q)	(Russia) Veronika Kudermetova	(Australia) Astra Sharma (WC)
(Russia) Maria Sharapova (WC)	(Romania) Monica Niculescu (Q)	(Hungary) Tímea Babos	(Belarus) Aryna Sabalenka [11]
(Montenegro) Danka Kovinić	(Czech Republic) Kristýna Plíšková	(Germany) Tatjana Maria	(Belgium) Kirsten Flipkens
(Russia) Vitalia Diatchenko	(Chinese Taipei) Hsieh Su-wei	(Japan) Misaki Doi	(United States) Jennifer Brady
(United Kingdom) Katie Boulter (PR)	(Canada) Leylah Annie Fernandez (Q)	(United States) Shelby Rogers (Q)	(Latvia) Anastasija Sevastova [31]
(United States) Amanda Anisimova [21]	(Italy) Jasmine Paolini	(Ukraine) Kateryna Bondarenko (PR)	(Romania) Irina-Camelia Begu
(Czech Republic) Markéta Vondroušová [15]	(Germany) Antonia Lottner (Q)	(Ukraine) Kateryna Kozlova	(Italy) Elisabetta Cocciaretto (Q)
(Serbia) Nina Stojanović	(United States) Jessica Pegula	(United States) CoCo Vandeweghe (WC)	(France) Kristina Mladenovic

== Events ==
=== Men's singles ===
- (Serbia) Novak Djokovic def. (Austria) Dominic Thiem, 6–4, 4–6, 2–6, 6–3, 6–4

=== Women's singles ===
- (United States) Sofia Kenin def. (Spain) Garbiñe Muguruza, 4–6, 6–2, 6–2

=== Men's doubles ===
- (United States) Rajeev Ram / (United Kingdom) Joe Salisbury def. (Australia) Max Purcell / (Australia) Luke Saville, 6–4, 6–2

=== Women's doubles ===
- (Hungary) Tímea Babos / (France) Kristina Mladenovic def. (Chinese Taipei) Hsieh Su-wei / (Czech Republic) Barbora Strýcová, 6–2, 6–1

=== Mixed doubles ===
- (Czech Republic) Barbora Krejčíková / (Croatia) Nikola Mektić def. (United States) Bethanie Mattek-Sands / (United Kingdom) Jamie Murray, 5–7, 6–4, [10–1]

=== Wheelchair men's singles ===
- (Japan) Shingo Kunieda def. (United Kingdom) Gordon Reid, 6–4, 6–4

=== Wheelchair women's singles ===
- (Japan) Yui Kamiji def. (Netherlands) Aniek van Koot, 6–2, 6–2

=== Wheelchair quad singles ===
- (Australia) Dylan Alcott def. (United Kingdom) Andy Lapthorne, 6–0, 6–4

=== Wheelchair men's doubles ===
- (United Kingdom) Alfie Hewett / (United Kingdom) Gordon Reid def. (France) Stéphane Houdet / (France) Nicolas Peifer, 4–6, 6–4, [10–7]

=== Wheelchair women's doubles ===
- (Japan) Yui Kamiji / (United Kingdom) Jordanne Whiley def. (Netherlands) Diede de Groot / (Netherlands) Aniek van Koot, 6–2, 6–4

=== Wheelchair quad doubles ===
- (Australia) Dylan Alcott / (Australia) Heath Davidson def. (United Kingdom) Andy Lapthorne / (United States) David Wagner, 6–4, 6–3

=== Boys' singles ===
- (France) Harold Mayot def. (France) Arthur Cazaux, 6–4, 6–1

=== Girls' singles ===
- (Andorra) Victoria Jiménez Kasintseva def. (Poland) Weronika Baszak, 5–7, 6–2, 6–2

=== Boys' doubles ===
- (Romania) Nicholas David Ionel / (Switzerland) Leandro Riedi def. (Poland) Mikołaj Lorens / (Latvia) Kārlis Ozoliņš, 6–7^{(8–10)}, 7–5, [10–4]

=== Girls' doubles ===
- (Philippines) Alex Eala / (Indonesia) Priska Madelyn Nugroho def. (Slovenia) Živa Falkner / (United Kingdom) Matilda Mutavdzic, 6–1, 6–2

== Point distribution and prize money ==
=== Point distribution ===
Below is a series of tables for each of the competitions showing the ranking points offered for each event.

==== Senior points ====
Event	W	F	SF	QF	Round of 16	Round of 32	Round of 64	Round of 128	Q	Q3	Q2	Q1
Men's singles	2000	1200	720	360	180	90	45	10	25	16	8	0
Men's doubles	2000	1200	720	360	180	90	0	—N/a	—N/a	—N/a	—N/a	—N/a
Women's singles	2000	1300	780	430	240	130	70	10	40	30	20	2
Women's doubles	2000	1300	780	430	240	130	10	—N/a	—N/a	—N/a	—N/a	—N/a

==== Wheelchair points ====
Event	W	F	SF/3rd	QF/4th
Singles	800	500	375	100
Doubles	800	500	100	—N/a
Quad singles	800	500	100	—N/a
Quad doubles	800	100	—N/a	—N/a

==== Junior points ====
Event	W	F	SF	QF	Round of 16	Round of 32	Q	Q3
Boys' singles	375	270	180	120	75	30	25	20
Girls' singles	375	270	180	120	75	30	25	20
Boys' doubles	270	180	120	75	45	—N/a	—N/a	—N/a
Girls' doubles	270	180	120	75	45	—N/a	—N/a	—N/a

=== Prize money ===
The Australian Open total prize money for 2020 was increased by 13.6% to a tournament record A$71,000,000.

Event	W	F	SF	QF	Round of 16	Round of 32	Round of 64	Round of 128^{1}	Q3	Q2	Q1
Singles	A$4,120,000	A$2,065,000	A$1,040,000	A$525,000	A$300,000	A$180,000	A$128,000	A$90,000	A$50,000	A$32,500	A$20,000
Doubles *	A$760,000	A$380,000	A$200,000	A$110,000	A$62,000	A$38,000	A$25,000	—N/a	—N/a	—N/a	—N/a
Mixed doubles *	A$190,000	A$100,000	A$50,000	A$24,000	A$12,000	A$6,250	—N/a	—N/a	—N/a	—N/a	—N/a

^{1}Qualifiers prize money was also the Round of 128 prize money.
*per team

Preceded by 2019 US Open	Grand Slams	Succeeded by 2020 US Open; 2020 Wimbledon cancelled
