= 2020 Australian Open – Men's singles =

Men's singles
- 2020 Australian Open

Final
- Champion: (Serbia) Novak Djokovic
- Runner-up: (Austria) Dominic Thiem
- Score: 6–4, 4–6, 2–6, 6–3, 6–4

Details
- Draw: 128 ( 16Q / 8WC)
- Seeds: 32

Events
Singles	men	women		boys	girls
Doubles	men	women	mixed	boys	girls
WC Singles	men	women	quad
WC Doubles	men	women	quad
Legends	men	women	mixed
- Australian Open

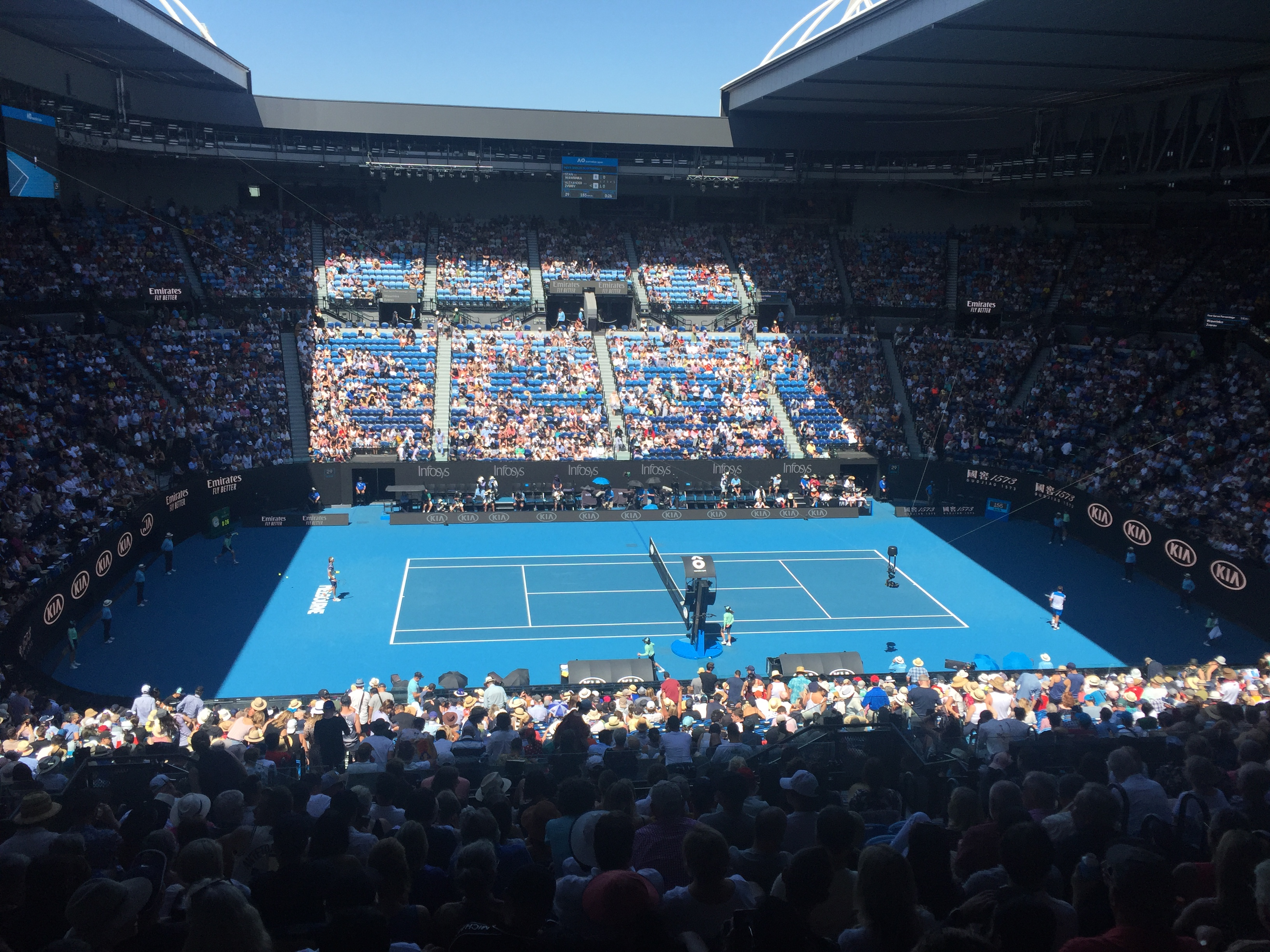
Quarterfinal match between Alexander Zverev and Stan Wawrinka being played on the Rod Laver Arena at the 2020 Australian Open.

Defending champion Novak Djokovic defeated Dominic Thiem in the final, 6–4, 4–6, 2–6, 6–3, 6–4 to win the men's singles tennis title at the 2020 Australian Open. It was his record-extending eighth Australian Open title and 17th major title overall. With the win, Djokovic regained the world No. 1 singles ranking after Rafael Nadal lost in the quarterfinals, and became the first player since Ken Rosewall to win major titles in three different decades. The match also marked the first time Djokovic came back to win a major final after trailing two sets to one, having lost each of the last seven times this happened. Thiem became the first Austrian to reach the final. This was Thiem's third runner-up finish in as many major finals (though he would go on to win the US Open later that year). The final also marked the first time in the Open Era that three consecutive men's major finals went to five sets, following the finals at the 2019 Wimbledon Championships and the 2019 US Open.

This marked the final Australian Open appearance for former world No. 1, six-time champion, and 20-time major champion Roger Federer. With his third-round win, Federer became the first player to win 100 matches at the Australian Open. He also became the first player to earn 100 match wins at two majors (the other being Wimbledon). Federer's semifinal encounter with Djokovic marked their 50th and final professional meeting; Djokovic won to end their head-to-head at 27–23 in his favor. This was also the first Australian Open appearance for future world No. 1 and two-time champion Jannik Sinner; he lost to Márton Fucsovics in the second round.

== Seeds ==
All seedings per ATP rankings.

1. (Spain) Rafael Nadal (quarterfinals)
2. (Serbia) Novak Djokovic (champion)
3. (Switzerland) Roger Federer (semifinals)
4. (Russia) Daniil Medvedev (fourth round)
5. (Austria) Dominic Thiem (final)
6. (Greece) Stefanos Tsitsipas (third round)
7. (Germany) Alexander Zverev (semifinals)
8. (Italy) Matteo Berrettini (second round)
9. (Spain) Roberto Bautista Agut (third round)
10. (France) Gaël Monfils (fourth round)
11. (Belgium) David Goffin (third round)
12. (Italy) Fabio Fognini (fourth round)
13. (Canada) Denis Shapovalov (first round)
14. (Argentina) Diego Schwartzman (fourth round)
15. (Switzerland) Stan Wawrinka (quarterfinals)
16. (Russia) Karen Khachanov (third round)

17. (Russia) Andrey Rublev (fourth round)
18. (Bulgaria) Grigor Dimitrov (second round)
19. (United States) John Isner (third round, retired)
20. (Canada) Félix Auger-Aliassime (first round)
21. (France) Benoît Paire (second round)
22. (Argentina) Guido Pella (third round)
23. (Australia) Nick Kyrgios (fourth round)
24. (Serbia) Dušan Lajović (third round)
25. (Croatia) Borna Ćorić (first round)
26. (Georgia (country)) Nikoloz Basilashvili (second round)
27. (Spain) Pablo Carreño Busta (third round)
28. (France) Jo-Wilfried Tsonga (first round, retired)
29. (United States) Taylor Fritz (third round)
30. (United Kingdom) Dan Evans (second round)
31. (Poland) Hubert Hurkacz (second round)
32. (Canada) Milos Raonic (quarterfinals)

Click on the seed number of a player to go to their draw section.

== Draw ==
Key

- Q = Qualifier
- WC = Wild card
- LL = Lucky loser
- Alt = Alternate
- ITF = ITF entry
- PR = Protected ranking
- SR = Special ranking
- SE = Special exempt
- JE = Junior exempt
- JR = Junior Accelerator Programme entrant
- CO = College Accelerator Programme entrant
- NG = Next Gen Accelerator Program entrant
- w/o = Walkover
- r = Retired
- d = Defaulted

=== Finals ===
Quarterfinals
1	(Spain) Rafael Nadal	6^{3}	6^{4}	6	6^{6}
5	(Austria) Dominic Thiem	7^{7}	7^{7}	4	7^{8}
15	(Switzerland) Stan Wawrinka	6	3	4	2
7	(Germany) Alexander Zverev	1	6	6	6
(United States) Tennys Sandgren	3	6	6	6^{8}	3
3	(Switzerland) Roger Federer	6	2	2	7^{10}	6
32	(Canada) Milos Raonic	4	3	6^{1}
2	(Serbia) Novak Djokovic	6	6	7^{7}

Semifinals
5	(Austria) Dominic Thiem	3	6	7^{7}	7^{7}
7	(Germany) Alexander Zverev	6	4	6^{3}	6^{4}
3	(Switzerland) Roger Federer	6^{1}	4	3
2	(Serbia) Novak Djokovic	7^{7}	6	6

Final
5	(Austria) Dominic Thiem	4	6	6	3	4
2	(Serbia) Novak Djokovic	6	4	2	6	6

=== Top half ===
==== Section 1 ====
First round
1	(Spain) R Nadal	6	6	6
(Bolivia) H Dellien	2	3	0
(Argentina) F Delbonis	6	6	7^{7}
(Portugal) J Sousa	3	4	6^{3}
Q	(United States) C Eubanks	6^{1}	3	6	0
Q	(Germany) P Gojowczyk	7^{7}	6	4	6
LL	(Slovakia) J Kovalík	4	6	1	6^{2}
27	(Spain) P Carreño Busta	6	3	6	7^{7}
23	(Australia) N Kyrgios	6	7^{7}	7^{7}
(Italy) L Sonego	2	6^{3}	6^{1}
(Uruguay) P Cuevas	1	3	3
(France) G Simon	6	6	6
(Japan) Y Uchiyama	4	1	2
(Sweden) M Ymer	6	6	6
Q	(Spain) M Vilella Martínez	6	4	6^{4}	3
16	(Russia) K Khachanov	4	6	7^{7}	6

Second round
1	(Spain) R Nadal	6	7^{7}	6
(Argentina) F Delbonis	3	6^{4}	1
Q	(Germany) P Gojowczyk	4	1	6	4
27	(Spain) P Carreño Busta	6	6	1	6
23	(Australia) N Kyrgios	6	6	4	7
(France) G Simon	2	4	6	5
(Sweden) M Ymer	2	6	4	6	6^{8}
16	(Russia) K Khachanov	6	2	6	3	7^{10}

Third round
1	(Spain) R Nadal	6	6	6
27	(Spain) P Carreño Busta	1	2	4
23	(Australia) N Kyrgios	6	7^{7}	6^{6}	6^{7}	7^{10}
16	(Russia) K Khachanov	2	6^{5}	7^{8}	7^{9}	6^{8}

Fourth round
1	(Spain) R Nadal	6	3	7^{8}	7^{7}
23	(Australia) N Kyrgios	3	6	6^{6}	6^{4}

==== Section 2 ====
First round
10	(France) G Monfils	6	6	6
PR	(Chinese Taipei) Y-h Lu	1	4	2
(Croatia) I Karlović	7^{7}	6	7
PR	(Canada) V Pospisil	6^{4}	4	5
(Australia) J Duckworth	4	7^{7}	7^{7}	2	4
(Slovenia) A Bedene	6	6^{5}	6^{5}	6	6
Q	(Latvia) E Gulbis	7	4	7^{7}	6
20	(Canada) F Auger-Aliassime	5	6	6^{4}	4
29	(United States) T Fritz	6	6	6
Q	(Netherlands) T Griekspoor	3	3	3
Q	(Belarus) I Ivashka	4	6	6	4	6^{8}
(South Africa) K Anderson	6	2	4	6	7^{10}
WC	(Australia) A Bolt	7^{7}	1	6^{5}	6	6
(Spain) A Ramos Viñolas	6^{1}	6	7^{7}	1	4
(France) A Mannarino	3	5	2
5	(Austria) D Thiem	6	7	6

Second round
10	(France) G Monfils	4	7^{10}	6	7
(Croatia) I Karlović	6	6^{8}	4	5
(Slovenia) A Bedene	5	3	2
Q	(Latvia) E Gulbis	7	6	6
29	(United States) T Fritz	4	6^{5}	7^{7}	6	6
(South Africa) K Anderson	6	7^{7}	6^{4}	2	2
WC	(Australia) A Bolt	2	7	7^{7}	1	2
5	(Austria) D Thiem	6	5	6^{5}	6	6

Third round
10	(France) G Monfils	7^{7}	6	6
Q	(Latvia) E Gulbis	6^{2}	4	3
29	(United States) T Fritz	2	4	7^{7}	4
5	(Austria) D Thiem	6	6	6^{5}	6

Fourth round
10	(France) G Monfils	2	4	4
5	(Austria) D Thiem	6	6	6

==== Section 3 ====
First round
4	(Russia) D Medvedev	6	4	6	6
(United States) F Tiafoe	3	6	4	2
(Germany) D Koepfer	3	4	5
Q	(Spain) P Martínez	6	6	7
WC	(France) H Gaston	5	7	0	3
(Spain) J Munar	7	5	6	6
(Australia) A Popyrin	6^{5}	6	6	0
28	(France) J-W Tsonga	7^{7}	2	1	0^{r}
19	(United States) J Isner	6^{5}	7^{7}	7^{9}	7^{7}
(Brazil) T Monteiro	7^{7}	6^{4}	6^{7}	6^{5}
Q	(Chile) A Tabilo	4	6	6	6^{6}	6
Q	(Colombia) DE Galán	6	3	4	7^{8}	4
(Serbia) M Kecmanović	4	4	6^{3}
(Italy) A Seppi	6	6	7^{7}
(Bosnia and Herzegovina) D Džumhur	5	7^{7}	4	4
15	(Switzerland) S Wawrinka	7	6^{4}	6	6

Second round
4	(Russia) D Medvedev	7	6	6
Q	(Spain) P Martínez	5	1	3
(Spain) J Munar	2	6^{5}	2
(Australia) A Popyrin	6	7^{7}	6
19	(United States) J Isner	6	6	6
Q	(Chile) A Tabilo	4	3	3
(Italy) A Seppi	6	5	3	6	4
15	(Switzerland) S Wawrinka	4	7	6	3	6

Third round
4	(Russia) D Medvedev	6	6	6
(Australia) A Popyrin	4	3	2
19	(United States) J Isner	4	1^{r}
15	(Switzerland) S Wawrinka	6	4

Fourth round
4	(Russia) D Medvedev	2	6	6	6^{2}	2
15	(Switzerland) S Wawrinka	6	2	4	7^{7}	6

==== Section 4 ====
First round
11	(Belgium) D Goffin	6	6	6
(France) J Chardy	4	3	1
(France) P-H Herbert	7	3	3	7	6
(United Kingdom) C Norrie	5	6	6	5	4
(Japan) Y Sugita	6	6	6
Q	(France) E Benchetrit	2	0	3
WC	(Australia) C O'Connell	3	6	4	6^{5}
17	(Russia) A Rublev	6	0	6	7^{7}
26	(Georgia (country)) N Basilashvili	6^{5}	6	7	3	6
(South Korea) S-w Kwon	7^{7}	4	5	6	3
(Spain) F Verdasco	7	6	6
LL	(Russia) E Donskoy	5	2	1
(Norway) C Ruud	3	6^{6}	6	6	6^{6}
(Belarus) E Gerasimov	6	7^{8}	1	4	7^{10}
(Italy) M Cecchinato	4	6^{4}	3
7	(Germany) A Zverev	6	7^{7}	6

Second round
11	(Belgium) D Goffin	6	6	4	1	6
(France) P-H Herbert	1	4	6	6	3
(Japan) Y Sugita	2	3	6^{5}
17	(Russia) A Rublev	6	6	7^{7}
26	(Georgia (country)) N Basilashvili	6	6^{5}	4	4
(Spain) F Verdasco	4	7^{7}	6	6
(Belarus) E Gerasimov	6^{5}	4	5
7	(Germany) A Zverev	7^{7}	6	7

Third round
11	(Belgium) D Goffin	6	6^{3}	4	6^{4}
17	(Russia) A Rublev	2	7^{7}	6	7^{7}
(Spain) F Verdasco	2	2	4
7	(Germany) A Zverev	6	6	6

Fourth round
17	(Russia) A Rublev	4	4	4
7	(Germany) A Zverev	6	6	6

=== Bottom half ===
==== Section 5 ====
First round
8	(Italy) M Berrettini	6	6	6
WC	(Australia) A Harris	3	1	3
(United States) T Sandgren	6	6	7
Q	(Argentina) M Trungelliti	1	4	5
(Spain) R Carballés Baena	4	2	2
(Lithuania) R Berankis	6	6	6
(United States) S Querrey	6	6	6
25	(Croatia) B Ćorić	3	4	4
22	(Argentina) G Pella	6	7	6
WC	(Australia) J-P Smith	3	5	4
Q	(Egypt) M Safwat	7^{10}	6^{1}	4	6^{5}
(France) G Barrère	6^{8}	7^{7}	6	7^{7}
(Australia) J Thompson	6	6	6
(Kazakhstan) A Bublik	4	3	2
(United States) R Opelka	6	7^{7}	4	3	6^{5}
12	(Italy) F Fognini	3	6^{3}	6	6	7^{10}

Second round
8	(Italy) M Berrettini	6^{7}	4	6	6	5
(United States) T Sandgren	7^{9}	6	4	2	7
(Lithuania) R Berankis	6^{2}	6	4	4
(United States) S Querrey	7^{7}	4	6	6
22	(Argentina) G Pella	6	6	3	6
(France) G Barrère	1	4	6	3
(Australia) J Thompson	6^{4}	1	6	6	6^{4}
12	(Italy) F Fognini	7^{7}	6	3	4	7^{10}

Third round
(United States) T Sandgren	6	6	6
(United States) S Querrey	4	4	4
22	(Argentina) G Pella	6^{0}	2	3
12	(Italy) F Fognini	7^{7}	6	6

Fourth round
(United States) T Sandgren	7^{7}	7	6^{2}	6
12	(Italy) F Fognini	6^{5}	5	7^{7}	4

==== Section 6 ====
First round
13	(Canada) D Shapovalov	3	7^{9}	1	6^{3}
(Hungary) M Fucsovics	6	6^{7}	6	7^{7}
(Italy) J Sinner	7^{7}	6	6
Q	(Australia) M Purcell	6^{2}	2	4
(Argentina) L Mayer	6	4	4	4
(United States) T Paul	4	6	6	6
(Argentina) JI Londero	6	2	0	4
18	(Bulgaria) G Dimitrov	4	6	6	6
31	(Poland) H Hurkacz	6^{4}	1	6	6	6
Q	(Austria) D Novak	7^{7}	6	2	3	4
(Australia) J Millman	7^{7}	6	1	7
(France) U Humbert	6^{3}	3	6	5
Q	(France) Q Halys	6^{7}	6^{1}	6	6	5
(Serbia) F Krajinović	7^{9}	7^{7}	3	4	7
(United States) S Johnson	3	2	2
3	(Switzerland) R Federer	6	6	6

Second round
(Hungary) M Fucsovics	6	6	6
(Italy) J Sinner	4	4	3
(United States) T Paul	6	7^{8}	3	6^{3}	7^{10}
18	(Bulgaria) G Dimitrov	4	6^{6}	6	7^{7}	6^{3}
31	(Poland) H Hurkacz	4	5	3
(Australia) J Millman	6	7	6
(Serbia) F Krajinović	1	4	1
3	(Switzerland) R Federer	6	6	6

Third round
(Hungary) M Fucsovics	6	6	6
(United States) T Paul	1	1	4
(Australia) J Millman	6	6^{2}	4	6	6^{8}
3	(Switzerland) R Federer	4	7^{7}	6	4	7^{10}

Fourth round
(Hungary) M Fucsovics	6	1	2	2
3	(Switzerland) R Federer	4	6	6	6

==== Section 7 ====
First round
6	(Greece) S Tsitsipas	6	6	6
(Italy) S Caruso	0	2	3
(Germany) P Kohlschreiber	7	6	6
(United States) M Giron	5	1	2
(Chile) C Garín	6	6	6
(Italy) S Travaglia	4	3	4
LL	(Italy) L Giustino	2	1	3
32	(Canada) M Raonic	6	6	6
21	(France) B Paire	6	3	6	6^{2}	6
PR	(Germany) C-M Stebe	4	6	3	7^{7}	0
(Croatia) M Čilić	6	6	6
(France) C Moutet	3	2	4
(Spain) P Andújar	1	4	4
WC	(United States) M Mmoh	6	6	6
(Spain) F López	2	2	5
9	(Spain) R Bautista Agut	6	6	7

Second round
6	(Greece) S Tsitsipas	w/o
(Germany) P Kohlschreiber
(Chile) C Garín	3	4	2
32	(Canada) M Raonic	6	6	6
21	(France) B Paire	2	7^{8}	6	1	6^{3}
(Croatia) M Čilić	6	6^{6}	3	6	7^{10}
WC	(United States) M Mmoh	7	2	4	1
9	(Spain) R Bautista Agut	5	6	6	6

Third round
6	(Greece) S Tsitsipas	5	4	6^{2}
32	(Canada) M Raonic	7	6	7^{7}
(Croatia) M Čilić	6^{3}	6	6	5	6
9	(Spain) R Bautista Agut	7^{7}	4	0	7	3

Fourth round
32	(Canada) M Raonic	6	6	7
(Croatia) M Čilić	4	3	5

==== Section 8 ====
First round
14	(Argentina) D Schwartzman	6	6	6
(South Africa) L Harris	4	2	2
(Spain) A Davidovich Fokina	4	6	2	6	6
Q	(Slovakia) N Gombos	6	4	6	3	2
WC	(Australia) M Polmans	6	6	4	6^{8}	6
(Kazakhstan) M Kukushkin	4	3	6	7^{10}	4
(United Kingdom) K Edmund	6^{7}	3	6^{4}
24	(Serbia) D Lajović	7^{9}	6	7^{7}
30	(United Kingdom) D Evans	3	4	6	6	6
PR	(United States) M McDonald	6	6	1	2	3
(Japan) Y Nishioka	6	3	6	7^{7}
(Serbia) L Đere	4	6	2	6^{1}
WC	(Japan) T Ito	6	6	7
LL	(India) P Gunneswaran	4	2	5
(Germany) J-L Struff	6^{5}	2	6	1
2	(Serbia) N Djokovic	7^{7}	6	2	6

Second round
14	(Argentina) D Schwartzman	6	6	6
(Spain) A Davidovich Fokina	1	4	2
WC	(Australia) M Polmans	2	4	3
24	(Serbia) D Lajović	6	6	6
30	(United Kingdom) D Evans	4	3	4
(Japan) Y Nishioka	6	6	6
WC	(Japan) T Ito	1	4	2
2	(Serbia) N Djokovic	6	6	6

Third round
14	(Argentina) D Schwartzman	6	6	7^{9}
24	(Serbia) D Lajović	2	3	6^{7}
(Japan) Y Nishioka	3	2	2
2	(Serbia) N Djokovic	6	6	6

Fourth round
14	(Argentina) D Schwartzman	3	4	4
2	(Serbia) N Djokovic	6	6	6

== Seeded players ==
The following are the seeded players. Seedings are based on ATP rankings on 13 January 2020, while ranking and points before are as of 20 January 2020. Points after are as of 3 February 2020.

Seed	Rank	Player	Points before	Points defending (or 18th best result)^{†}	Points won	Points after	Status
1	1	(Spain) Rafael Nadal	10,235	1,200	360	9,395	Quarterfinals lost to (Austria) Dominic Thiem [5]
2	2	(Serbia) Novak Djokovic	9,720	2,000	2,000	9,720	Champion, defeated (Austria) Dominic Thiem [5]
3	3	(Switzerland) Roger Federer	6,590	180	720	7,130	Semifinals lost to (Serbia) Novak Djokovic [2]
4	4	(Russia) Daniil Medvedev	5,960	180	180	5,960	Fourth round lost to (Switzerland) Stan Wawrinka [15]
5	5	(Austria) Dominic Thiem	5,890	45	1,200	7,045	Final lost to (Serbia) Novak Djokovic [2]
6	6	(Greece) Stefanos Tsitsipas	5,375	720	90	4,745	Third round lost to (Canada) Milos Raonic [32]
7	7	(Germany) Alexander Zverev	3,345	180	720	3,885	Semifinals lost to (Austria) Dominic Thiem [5]
8	8	(Italy) Matteo Berrettini	2,870	10	45	2,905	Second round lost to (United States) Tennys Sandgren
9	9	(Spain) Roberto Bautista Agut	2,630	360	90	2,360	Third round lost to (Croatia) Marin Čilić
10	10	(France) Gaël Monfils	2,565	45	180	2,700	Fourth round lost to (Austria) Dominic Thiem [5]
11	11	(Belgium) David Goffin	2,555	90	90	2,555	Third round lost to (Russia) Andrey Rublev [17]
12	12	(Italy) Fabio Fognini	2,310	90	180	2,400	Fourth round lost to (United States) Tennys Sandgren
13	13	(Canada) Denis Shapovalov	2,200	90	10	2,120	First round lost to (Hungary) Márton Fucsovics
14	14	(Argentina) Diego Schwartzman	2,130	90	180	2,220	Fourth round lost to (Serbia) Novak Djokovic [2]
15	15	(Switzerland) Stan Wawrinka	2,045	45	360	2,360	Quarterfinals lost to (Germany) Alexander Zverev [7]
16	17	(Russia) Karen Khachanov	1,995	90	90	1,995	Third round lost to (Australia) Nick Kyrgios [23]
17	16	(Russia) Andrey Rublev	2,004	10	180	2,174	Fourth round lost to (Germany) Alexander Zverev [7]
18	20	(Bulgaria) Grigor Dimitrov	1,772	180	45	1,637	Second round lost to (United States) Tommy Paul
19	19	(United States) John Isner	1,860	10	90	1,940	Third round retired against (Switzerland) Stan Wawrinka [15]
20	22	(Canada) Félix Auger-Aliassime	1,701	(45)	10	1,666	First round lost to (Latvia) Ernests Gulbis [Q]
21	21	(France) Benoît Paire	1,703	10	45	1,738	Second round lost to (Croatia) Marin Čilić
22	25	(Argentina) Guido Pella	1,585	10	90	1,665	Third round lost to (Italy) Fabio Fognini [12]
23	26	(Australia) Nick Kyrgios	1,520	10	180	1,690	Fourth round lost to (Spain) Rafael Nadal [1]
24	27	(Serbia) Dušan Lajović	1,516	10	90	1,596	Third round lost to (Argentina) Diego Schwartzman [14]
25	28	(Croatia) Borna Ćorić	1,490	180	10	1,320	First round lost to (United States) Sam Querrey
26	29	(Georgia (country)) Nikoloz Basilashvili	1,485	90	45	1,440	Second round lost to (Spain) Fernando Verdasco
27	30	(Spain) Pablo Carreño Busta	1,422	180	90	1,332	Third round lost to (Spain) Rafael Nadal [1]
28	33	(France) Jo-Wilfried Tsonga	1,340	45	10	1,305	First round retired against (Australia) Alexei Popyrin
29	34	(United States) Taylor Fritz	1,335	90+125	90+45	1,255	Third round lost to (Austria) Dominic Thiem [5]
30	32	(United Kingdom) Dan Evans	1,349	70+48	45+20	1,296	Second round lost to (Japan) Yoshihito Nishioka
31	31	(Poland) Hubert Hurkacz	1,398	10	45	1,433	Second round lost to (Australia) John Millman
32	35	(Canada) Milos Raonic	1,305	360	360	1,305	Quarterfinals lost to (Serbia) Novak Djokovic [2]

† This column shows either the player's points from the 2019 tournament or his 18th best result (shown in brackets). Only ranking points counting towards the player's ranking as of 13 January 2020 are reflected in the column.

=== Withdrawn players ===
The following players would have been seeded, but they withdrew from the event.

Rank	Player	Points before	Points defending	Points after	Withdrawal reason
18	(Japan) Kei Nishikori	1,930	360	1,570	Elbow injury
23	(Australia) Alex de Minaur	1,665	90	1,575	Abdominal injury
24	(France) Lucas Pouille	1,600	720	880	Elbow injury

== Other entry information ==
=== Wild cards ===
- (Australia) Alex Bolt
- (France) Hugo Gaston
- (Australia) Andrew Harris
- (Japan) Tatsuma Ito
- (United States) Michael Mmoh
- (Australia) Christopher O'Connell
- (Australia) Marc Polmans
- (Australia) John-Patrick Smith

=== Protected ranking ===
- (Chinese Taipei) Lu Yen-hsun (71)
- (Canada) Vasek Pospisil (73)
- (United States) Mackenzie McDonald (83)
- (Germany) Cedrik-Marcel Stebe (95)

=== Qualifiers ===
- (France) Elliot Benchetrit
- (United States) Christopher Eubanks
- (Colombia) Daniel Elahi Galán
- (Germany) Peter Gojowczyk
- (Slovakia) Norbert Gombos
- (Netherlands) Tallon Griekspoor
- (Latvia) Ernests Gulbis
- (France) Quentin Halys
- (Belarus) Ilya Ivashka
- (Spain) Pedro Martínez
- (Austria) Dennis Novak
- (Australia) Max Purcell
- (Egypt) Mohamed Safwat
- (Chile) Alejandro Tabilo
- (Argentina) Marco Trungelliti
- (Spain) Mario Vilella Martínez

=== Lucky losers ===
- (Russia) Evgeny Donskoy
- (Italy) Lorenzo Giustino
- (India) Prajnesh Gunneswaran
- (Slovakia) Jozef Kovalík

=== Withdrawals ===
- ‡ (Ukraine) Alexandr Dolgopolov (66 PR) → replaced by (South Africa) Lloyd Harris (99)
- ‡ (France) Lucas Pouille (22) → replaced by (United States) Jared Donaldson (99 PR) (Note: Donaldson had initially replaced Pouille, but later withdrew due to continuous injuries, he was replaced by Majchrzak but the latter withdrew to recurring injury.)
- ‡ (Japan) Kei Nishikori (13) → replaced by (Australia) James Duckworth (100)
- ‡ (United States) Jared Donaldson (99 PR) → replaced by (Poland) Kamil Majchrzak (101)
- ‡ (Argentina) Juan Martín del Potro (22 PR) → replaced by (United States) Marcos Giron (102)
- ‡ (France) Richard Gasquet (61) → replaced by (Japan) Yūichi Sugita (103) (Note: Last direct acceptance)
- @ (Poland) Kamil Majchrzak (101) → replaced by (Slovakia) Jozef Kovalík (LL)
- @ (Chile) Nicolás Jarry (77) → replaced by (India) Prajnesh Gunneswaran (LL)
- @ (Australia) Alex de Minaur (18) → replaced by (Russia) Evgeny Donskoy (LL)
- § (Moldova) Radu Albot (46) → replaced by (Italy) Lorenzo Giustino (LL)

‡ – withdrew from entry list before qualifying began
@ – withdrew from entry list after qualifying began
§ – withdrew from main draw

== Championship match ratings ==
504 thousand on ESPN, in the USA.

== Notes ==
Preceded by 2019 US Open – Men's singles	Grand Slam men's singles	Succeeded by 2020 US Open – Men's singles
