= 2020 Australian Open – Women's singles =

Women's singles
- 2020 Australian Open

Final
- Champion: (United States) Sofia Kenin
- Runner-up: (Spain) Garbiñe Muguruza
- Score: 4–6, 6–2, 6–2

Details
- Draw: 128 (16Q / 8WC)
- Seeds: 32

Events
Singles	men	women		boys	girls
Doubles	men	women	mixed	boys	girls
WC Singles	men	women	quad
WC Doubles	men	women	quad
Legends	men	women	mixed
- Australian Open

Sofia Kenin defeated Garbiñe Muguruza in the final, 4–6, 6–2, 6–2 to win the women's singles tennis title at the 2020 Australian Open. It was her first major title. Kenin was the youngest Australian Open finalist since Ana Ivanovic and the youngest champion since Maria Sharapova, both in 2008. This was the first Australian Open final in the Open Era between two players ranked outside the top ten. Kenin entered the top 10 in rankings for the first time by winning the title.

Naomi Osaka was the defending champion, but lost to Coco Gauff in the third round.

This marked the final professional appearance of former world No. 1 and five-time major champion Sharapova, who lost to Donna Vekić in the first round.

This was the first Australian Open appearance for 2026 champion, three-time major champion and future world No. 1 Elena Rybakina. She lost in the third round to Ashleigh Barty.

The elimination of Angelique Kerber in the fourth round guaranteed a first-time Australian Open champion for the third year in a row. Ons Jabeur became the first Arab woman to reach a major singles quarterfinal, and the first African woman to do so since Amanda Coetzer at the 2001 Australian Open. Anett Kontaveit was the second Estonian to reach a major quarterfinal after Kaia Kanepi. Barty was the first Australian to reach the semifinals since Wendy Turnbull in 1984. Barty's quarterfinal win over Petra Kvitová was her first top ten singles win at a major, having lost her five previous such matches.

== Seeds ==
Seeding per WTA rankings.

1. (Australia) Ashleigh Barty (semifinals)
2. (Czech Republic) Karolína Plíšková (third round)
3. (Japan) Naomi Osaka (third round)
4. (Romania) Simona Halep (semifinals)
5. (Ukraine) Elina Svitolina (third round)
6. (Switzerland) Belinda Bencic (third round)
7. (Czech Republic) Petra Kvitová (quarterfinals)
8. (United States) Serena Williams (third round)
9. (Netherlands) Kiki Bertens (fourth round)
10. (United States) Madison Keys (third round)
11. (Belarus) Aryna Sabalenka (first round)
12. (United Kingdom) Johanna Konta (first round)
13. (Croatia) Petra Martić (second round)
14. (United States) Sofia Kenin (champion)
15. (Czech Republic) Markéta Vondroušová (first round)
16. (Belgium) Elise Mertens (fourth round)

17. (Germany) Angelique Kerber (fourth round)
18. (United States) Alison Riske (fourth round)
19. (Croatia) Donna Vekić (third round)
20. (Czech Republic) Karolína Muchová (second round)
21. (United States) Amanda Anisimova (first round)
22. (Greece) Maria Sakkari (fourth round)
23. (Ukraine) Dayana Yastremska (second round)
24. (United States) Sloane Stephens (first round)
25. (Russia) Ekaterina Alexandrova (third round)
26. (United States) Danielle Collins (second round)
27. (China) Wang Qiang (fourth round)
28. (Estonia) Anett Kontaveit (quarterfinals)
29. (Kazakhstan) Elena Rybakina (third round)
30. (Russia) Anastasia Pavlyuchenkova (quarterfinals)
31. (Latvia) Anastasija Sevastova (first round)
32. (Czech Republic) Barbora Strýcová (first round)

Click on the seed number of a player to go to their draw section.

== Draw ==
Key

- Q = Qualifier
- WC = Wild card
- LL = Lucky loser
- Alt = Alternate
- ITF = ITF entry
- PR = Protected ranking
- SR = Special ranking
- SE = Special exempt
- JE = Junior exempt
- JR = Junior Accelerator Programme entrant
- CO = College Accelerator Programme entrant
- NG = Next Gen Accelerator Program entrant
- w/o = Walkover
- r = Retired
- d = Defaulted

=== Finals ===
Quarterfinals
1	(Australia) Ashleigh Barty	7^{8}	6
7	(Czech Republic) Petra Kvitová	6^{6}	2
14	(United States) Sofia Kenin	6	6
(Tunisia) Ons Jabeur	4	4
28	(Estonia) Anett Kontaveit	1	1
4	(Romania) Simona Halep	6	6
(Spain) Garbiñe Muguruza	7	6
30	(Russia) Anastasia Pavlyuchenkova	5	3

Semifinals
1	(Australia) Ashleigh Barty	6^{6}	5
14	(United States) Sofia Kenin	7^{8}	7
4	(Romania) Simona Halep	6^{8}	5
(Spain) Garbiñe Muguruza	7^{10}	7

Final
14	(United States) Sofia Kenin	4	6	6
(Spain) Garbiñe Muguruza	6	2	2

=== Top half ===
==== Section 1 ====
First round
1	(Australia) A Barty	5	6	6
(Ukraine) L Tsurenko	7	1	1
(Slovenia) P Hercog	6	6
(Sweden) R Peterson	3	3
(Belarus) A Sasnovich	6^{3}	6	5
Q	(Belgium) G Minnen	7^{7}	4	7
(United States) B Pera	3	2
29	(Kazakhstan) E Rybakina	6	6
18	(United States) A Riske	7^{7}	2	6
(China) Y Wang	6^{5}	6	3
(Switzerland) V Golubic	6	1	6^{5}
(China) L Zhu	4	6	7^{10}
(Germany) J Görges	6	6
(Slovakia) V Kužmová	1	2
(United States) C McHale	3	0
13	(Croatia) P Martić	6	6

Second round
1	(Australia) A Barty	6	6
(Slovenia) P Hercog	1	4
Q	(Belgium) G Minnen	3	4
29	(Kazakhstan) E Rybakina	6	6
18	(United States) A Riske	6	6
(China) L Zhu	3	1
(Germany) J Görges	4	6	7
13	(Croatia) P Martić	6	3	5

Third round
1	(Australia) A Barty	6	6
29	(Kazakhstan) E Rybakina	3	2
18	(United States) A Riske	1	7^{7}	6
(Germany) J Görges	6	6^{4}	2

Fourth round
1	(Australia) A Barty	6	1	6
18	(United States) A Riske	3	6	4

==== Section 2 ====
First round
10	(United States) M Keys	6	6
(Russia) D Kasatkina	3	1
(Poland) M Linette	6	3	4
(Netherlands) A Rus	1	6	6
Q	(Japan) N Hibino	4	7^{8}	6
(China) S Peng	6	6^{6}	3
(Russia) M Gasparyan	2	2
22	(Greece) M Sakkari	6	6
25	(Russia) E Alexandrova	6	4	6
(Switzerland) J Teichmann	4	6	2
(Estonia) K Kanepi	6^{3}	6	3
Q	(Czech Republic) B Krejčíková	7^{7}	2	6
(Spain) P Badosa	6	6
Q	(Sweden) J Larsson	1	0
(Czech Republic) K Siniaková	1	0
7	(Czech Republic) P Kvitová	6	6

Second round
10	(United States) M Keys	7^{7}	6
(Netherlands) A Rus	6^{3}	2
Q	(Japan) N Hibino	6^{4}	4
22	(Greece) M Sakkari	7^{7}	6
25	(Russia) E Alexandrova	6	6
Q	(Czech Republic) B Krejčíková	1	3
(Spain) P Badosa	5	5
7	(Czech Republic) P Kvitová	7	7

Third round
10	(United States) M Keys	4	4
22	(Greece) M Sakkari	6	6
25	(Russia) E Alexandrova	1	2
7	(Czech Republic) P Kvitová	6	6

Fourth round
22	(Greece) M Sakkari	7^{7}	3	2
7	(Czech Republic) P Kvitová	6^{4}	6	6

==== Section 3 ====
First round
3	(Japan) N Osaka	6	6
(Czech Republic) M Bouzková	2	4
(China) S Zheng	6	6
Q	(Russia) A Kalinskaya	3	2
(United States) V Williams	6^{5}	3
(United States) C Gauff	7^{7}	6
(Romania) S Cîrstea	6	7^{7}
32	(Czech Republic) B Strýcová	2	6^{5}
24	(United States) S Stephens	6	5	2
(China) S Zhang	2	7	6
(Australia) S Stosur	1	4
Q	(United States) C McNally	6	6
Q	(United States) A Li	7^{7}	7^{12}
WC	(Australia) L Cabrera	6^{4}	6^{10}
Q	(Italy) M Trevisan	2	4
14	(United States) S Kenin	6	6

Second round
3	(Japan) N Osaka	6	6
(China) S Zheng	2	4
(United States) C Gauff	4	6	7
(Romania) S Cîrstea	6	3	5
(China) S Zhang	6	6
Q	(United States) C McNally	2	4
Q	(United States) A Li	1	3
14	(United States) S Kenin	6	6

Third round
3	(Japan) N Osaka	3	4
(United States) C Gauff	6	6
(China) S Zhang	5	6^{7}
14	(United States) S Kenin	7	7^{9}

Fourth round
(United States) C Gauff	7^{7}	3	0
14	(United States) S Kenin	6^{5}	6	6

==== Section 4 ====
First round
12	(United Kingdom) J Konta	4	2
(Tunisia) O Jabeur	6	6
(United States) M Brengle	7^{7}	2	2
(France) C Garcia	6^{5}	6	6
(United States) K Ahn	1	3
(Denmark) C Wozniacki	6	6
Q	(Slovenia) K Juvan	1	1
23	(Ukraine) D Yastremska	6	6
27	(China) Q Wang	7^{7}	6
WC	(France) P Parmentier	6^{2}	3
(France) F Ferro	6	6
(Belgium) A Van Uytvanck	2	1
(Slovenia) T Zidanšek	6	6
WC	(South Korea) N-l Han	3	3
(Russia) A Potapova	0	3
8	(United States) S Williams	6	6

Second round
(Tunisia) O Jabeur	1	6	6
(France) C Garcia	6	2	3
(Denmark) C Wozniacki	7	7
23	(Ukraine) D Yastremska	5	5
27	(China) Q Wang	6	6
(France) F Ferro	1	2
(Slovenia) T Zidanšek	2	3
8	(United States) S Williams	6	6

Third round
(Tunisia) O Jabeur	7	3	7
(Denmark) C Wozniacki	5	6	5
27	(China) Q Wang	6	6^{2}	7
8	(United States) S Williams	4	7^{7}	5

Fourth round
(Tunisia) O Jabeur	7^{7}	6
27	(China) Q Wang	6^{4}	1

=== Bottom half ===
==== Section 5 ====
First round
6	(Switzerland) B Bencic	6	7
PR	(Slovakia) AK Schmiedlová	3	5
Q	(Russia) L Samsonova	1	4
(Latvia) J Ostapenko	6	6
(Spain) S Sorribes Tormo	2	6	6
(Russia) V Kudermetova	6	1	1
WC	(Australia) A Sharma	0	2
28	(Estonia) A Kontaveit	6	6
19	(Croatia) D Vekić	6	6
WC	(Russia) M Sharapova	3	4
(France) A Cornet	5	6	6
Q	(Romania) M Niculescu	7	1	0
(Poland) I Świątek	6	6
(Hungary) T Babos	3	2
(Spain) C Suárez Navarro	7^{8}	7^{8}
11	(Belarus) A Sabalenka	6^{6}	6^{6}

Second round
6	(Switzerland) B Bencic	7	7
(Latvia) J Ostapenko	5	5
(Spain) S Sorribes Tormo	2	6	1
28	(Estonia) A Kontaveit	6	4	6
19	(Croatia) D Vekić	6	6
(France) A Cornet	4	2
(Poland) I Świątek	6	7
(Spain) C Suárez Navarro	3	5

Third round
6	(Switzerland) B Bencic	0	1
28	(Estonia) A Kontaveit	6	6
19	(Croatia) D Vekić	5	3
(Poland) I Świątek	7	6

Fourth round
28	(Estonia) A Kontaveit	6^{4}	7	7
(Poland) I Świątek	7^{7}	5	5

==== Section 6 ====
First round
16	(Belgium) E Mertens	6	6
(Montenegro) D Kovinić	2	0
(Czech Republic) Kr Plíšková	6	3	1
(United Kingdom) H Watson	4	6	6
PR	(United States) C Bellis	6	6
(Germany) T Maria	0	2
(Belgium) K Flipkens	3	6	6^{7}
20	(Czech Republic) K Muchová	6	2	7^{10}
26	(United States) D Collins	6	3	6
(Russia) V Diatchenko	1	6	4
(Kazakhstan) Y Putintseva	6	6
(Chinese Taipei) S-w Hsieh	1	3
Q	(United Kingdom) H Dart	2	6	7^{10}
(Japan) M Doi	6	4	6^{6}
(United States) J Brady	6^{5}	1
4	(Romania) S Halep	7^{7}	6

Second round
16	(Belgium) E Mertens	6	6
(United Kingdom) H Watson	3	0
PR	(United States) C Bellis	6	6
20	(Czech Republic) K Muchová	4	4
26	(United States) D Collins	4	6	5
(Kazakhstan) Y Putintseva	6	2	7
Q	(United Kingdom) H Dart	2	4
4	(Romania) S Halep	6	6

Third round
16	(Belgium) E Mertens	6	6^{5}	6
PR	(United States) C Bellis	1	7^{7}	0
(Kazakhstan) Y Putintseva	1	4
4	(Romania) S Halep	6	6

Fourth round
16	(Belgium) E Mertens	4	4
4	(Romania) S Halep	6	6

==== Section 7 ====
First round
5	(Ukraine) E Svitolina	6	7
PR	(United Kingdom) K Boulter	4	5
(United States) L Davis	6	6
Q	(Canada) L Fernandez	4	2
(Spain) G Muguruza	0	6	6
Q	(United States) S Rogers	6	1	0
(Australia) A Tomljanović	6	6
31	(Latvia) A Sevastova	1	1
21	(United States) A Anisimova	3	6	3
(Kazakhstan) Z Diyas	6	4	6
(Italy) J Paolini	5	4
(Russia) A Blinkova	7	6
PR	(Ukraine) K Bondarenko	6	6^{5}	0
WC	(Australia) Ar Rodionova	3	7^{7}	6
(Romania) I-C Begu	1	4
9	(Netherlands) K Bertens	6	6

Second round
5	(Ukraine) E Svitolina	6	7^{8}
(United States) L Davis	2	6^{6}
(Spain) G Muguruza	6	3	6
(Australia) A Tomljanović	3	6	3
(Kazakhstan) Z Diyas	4	6	6
(Russia) A Blinkova	6	3	4
WC	(Australia) Ar Rodionova	3	5
9	(Netherlands) K Bertens	6	7

Third round
5	(Ukraine) E Svitolina	1	2
(Spain) G Muguruza	6	6
(Kazakhstan) Z Diyas	2	6^{3}
9	(Netherlands) K Bertens	6	7^{7}

Fourth round
(Spain) G Muguruza	6	6
9	(Netherlands) K Bertens	3	3

==== Section 8 ====
First round
15	(Czech Republic) M Vondroušová	2	6	4
(Russia) S Kuznetsova	6	4	6
Q	(Germany) A Lottner	3	3
(Italy) C Giorgi	6	6
(Ukraine) K Kozlova	3	4
WC	(Australia) P Hon	6	6
Q	(Italy) E Cocciaretto	2	2
17	(Germany) A Kerber	6	6
30	(Russia) A Pavlyuchenkova	6	7
(Serbia) N Stojanović	1	5
(United States) T Townsend	6	7^{7}
(United States) J Pegula	4	6^{5}
(Germany) L Siegemund	6	6
WC	(United States) C Vandeweghe	1	4
(France) K Mladenovic	1	5
2	(Czech Republic) Ka Plíšková	6	7

Second round
(Russia) S Kuznetsova	3	1
(Italy) C Giorgi	6	6
WC	(Australia) P Hon	3	2
17	(Germany) A Kerber	6	6
30	(Russia) A Pavlyuchenkova	7	7^{7}
(United States) T Townsend	5	6^{1}
(Germany) L Siegemund	3	3
2	(Czech Republic) Ka Plíšková	6	6

Third round
(Italy) C Giorgi	2	7^{7}	3
17	(Germany) A Kerber	6	6^{4}	6
30	(Russia) A Pavlyuchenkova	7^{7}	7^{7}
2	(Czech Republic) Ka Plíšková	6^{4}	6^{3}

Fourth round
17	(Germany) A Kerber	7^{7}	6^{4}	2
30	(Russia) A Pavlyuchenkova	6^{5}	7^{7}	6

== Seeded players ==
The following are the seeded players. Seedings are based on WTA rankings on 13 January 2020, while ranking and points before are as of 20 January 2020. Points after are as of 3 February 2020. Because the 2020 tournament takes place one week later than in 2019, points defending includes results from both the 2019 Australian Open and the tournaments from the week of 28 January 2019 (St. Petersburg and Hua Hin).

Seed	Rank	Player	Points before	Points defending	Points won	Points after	Status
1	1	(Australia) Ashleigh Barty	8,017	430	780	8,367	Semifinals lost to (United States) Sofia Kenin [14]
2	2	(Czech Republic) Karolína Plíšková	5,940	780	130	5,290	Third round lost to (Russia) Anastasia Pavlyuchenkova [30]
3	4	(Japan) Naomi Osaka	5,496	2,000	130	3,626	Third round lost to (United States) Coco Gauff
4	3	(Romania) Simona Halep	5,561	240	780	6,101	Semifinals lost to (Spain) Garbiñe Muguruza
5	5	(Ukraine) Elina Svitolina	5,075	430	130	4,775	Third round lost to (Spain) Garbiñe Muguruza
6	7	(Switzerland) Belinda Bencic	4,675	130	130	4,675	Third round lost to (Estonia) Anett Kontaveit [28]
7	8	(Czech Republic) Petra Kvitová	4,436	1,300+100	430+0	3,466	Quarterfinals lost to (Australia) Ashleigh Barty [1]
8	9	(United States) Serena Williams	4,215	430	130	3,915	Third round lost to (China) Wang Qiang [27]
9	10	(Netherlands) Kiki Bertens	4,165	70+470	130+240	3,995	Fourth round lost to (Spain) Garbiñe Muguruza
10	11	(United States) Madison Keys	3,072	240	130	2,962	Third round lost to (Greece) Maria Sakkari [22]
11	12	(Belarus) Aryna Sabalenka	3,025	130+185	10+100	2,820	First round lost to (Spain) Carla Suárez Navarro
12	13	(United Kingdom) Johanna Konta	2,813	70	10	2,753	First round lost to (Tunisia) Ons Jabeur
13	14	(Croatia) Petra Martić	2,646	130	70	2,586	Second round lost to (Germany) Julia Görges
14	15	(United States) Sofia Kenin	2,565	70	2,000	4,495	Champion, defeated (Spain) Garbiñe Muguruza
15	16	(Czech Republic) Markéta Vondroušová	2,490	70	10	2,430	First round lost to (Russia) Svetlana Kuznetsova
16	17	(Belgium) Elise Mertens	2,250	130	240	2,360	Fourth round lost to (Romania) Simona Halep [4]
17	18	(Germany) Angelique Kerber	2,175	240	240	2,175	Fourth round lost to (Russia) Anastasia Pavlyuchenkova [30]
18	19	(United States) Alison Riske	2,130	10	240	2,360	Fourth round lost to (Australia) Ashleigh Barty [1]
19	20	(Croatia) Donna Vekić	2,120	70+305	130+60	1,935	Third round lost to (Poland) Iga Świątek
20	22	(Czech Republic) Karolína Muchová	1,847	40	70	1,877	Second round lost to (United States) Catherine Bellis [PR]
21	24	(United States) Amanda Anisimova	1,843	240	10	1,613	First round lost to (Kazakhstan) Zarina Diyas
22	23	(Greece) Maria Sakkari	1,845	130	240	1,955	Fourth round lost to (Czech Republic) Petra Kvitová [7]
23	21	(Ukraine) Dayana Yastremska	2,070	130+280	70+55	1,785	Second round lost to (Denmark) Caroline Wozniacki
24	27	(United States) Sloane Stephens	1,683	240	10	1,453	First round lost to (China) Zhang Shuai
25	28	(Russia) Ekaterina Alexandrova	1,645	10+125	130+60	1,700	Third round lost to (Czech Republic) Petra Kvitová [7]
26	25	(United States) Danielle Collins	1,825	780	70	1,115	Second round lost to (Kazakhstan) Yulia Putintseva
27	29	(China) Wang Qiang	1,593	130	240	1,703	Fourth round lost to (Tunisia) Ons Jabeur
28	31	(Estonia) Anett Kontaveit	1,575	70	430	1,935	Quarterfinals lost to (Romania) Simona Halep [4]
29	26	(Kazakhstan) Elena Rybakina	1,816	(80)^{†}	130	1,866	Third round lost to (Australia) Ashleigh Barty [1]
30	30	(Russia) Anastasia Pavlyuchenkova	1,585	430+100	430+1	1,486	Quarterfinals lost to (Spain) Garbiñe Muguruza
31	33	(Latvia) Anastasija Sevastova	1,518	240	10	1,288	First round lost to (Australia) Ajla Tomljanović
32	34	(Czech Republic) Barbora Strýcová	1,516	10	10	1,516	First round lost to (Romania) Sorana Cîrstea

† The player did not qualify for the tournament in 2019, but was defending points from an ITF tournament (Launceston).

=== Withdrawn players ===
The following player would have been seeded, but she withdrew from the event.

Rank	Player	Points before	Points defending	Points after	Withdrawal reason
6	(Canada) Bianca Andreescu	4,935	110+160	4,665	Knee injury

== Other entry information ==
=== Wild cards ===
- (Australia) Lizette Cabrera
- (South Korea) Han Na-lae
- (Australia) Priscilla Hon
- (France) Pauline Parmentier
- (Australia) Arina Rodionova
- (Russia) Maria Sharapova
- (Australia) Astra Sharma
- (United States) CoCo Vandeweghe

=== Protected ranking ===
- (United States) Catherine Bellis (45)
- (Ukraine) Kateryna Bondarenko (85)
- (United Kingdom) Katie Boulter (85)
- (Slovakia) Anna Karolína Schmiedlová (93)

=== Qualifiers ===
- (Italy) Elisabetta Cocciaretto
- (United Kingdom) Harriet Dart
- (Canada) Leylah Fernandez
- (Japan) Nao Hibino
- (Slovenia) Kaja Juvan
- (Russia) Anna Kalinskaya
- (Czech Republic) Barbora Krejčíková
- (Sweden) Johanna Larsson
- (United States) Ann Li
- (Germany) Antonia Lottner
- (United States) Caty McNally
- (Belgium) Greet Minnen
- (Romania) Monica Niculescu
- (United States) Shelby Rogers
- (Russia) Liudmila Samsonova
- (Italy) Martina Trevisan

=== Withdrawals ===
- † (Belarus) Victoria Azarenka (50) → replaced by (Italy) Camila Giorgi (100)
- ‡ (Puerto Rico) Monica Puig (79) → replaced by (Estonia) Kaia Kanepi (101)
- ‡ (Russia) Vera Zvonareva (78 PR) → replaced by (Romania) Irina-Camelia Begu (102)
- ‡ (Germany) Andrea Petkovic (78) → replaced by (United Kingdom) Heather Watson (103)
- ‡ (Canada) Bianca Andreescu (5) → replaced by (Russia) Margarita Gasparyan (104) (Note: Last direct acceptance)

† – not included on entry list
‡ – withdrew from entry list

== Championship match statistics ==
Category	(United States) Kenin	(Spain) Muguruza
1st serve %	64/87 (74%)	47/82 (57%)
1st serve points won	41 of 64 = 64%	35 of 47 = 74%
2nd serve points won	15 of 23 = 65%	11 of 35 = 31%
Total service points won	56 of 87 = 64.37%	46 of 82 = 56.10%
Aces	2	9
Double faults	0	8
Winners	28	32
Unforced errors	23	45
Net points won	5 of 7 = 71%	16 of 24 = 67%
Break points converted	5 of 6 = 83%	2 of 12 = 17%
Return points won	36 of 82 = 44%	31 of 87 = 36%
Total points won	92	77

== Notes ==
Preceded by 2019 US Open – Women's singles	Grand Slam women's singles	Succeeded by 2020 US Open – Women's singles
