= 2025 Crete Challenger V – Doubles =

Doubles
- 2025 Crete Challenger V

Final
- Champions: (Spain) Alberto Barroso Campos (Spain) Iñaki Montes de la Torre
- Runners-up: (Czech Republic) David Poljak (France) Max Westphal
- Score: 7–5, 7–6^{(7–3)}

Events
| Singles | Doubles |
- Crete Challenger

Mats Rosenkranz and Harry Wendelken were the defending champions but only Wendelken chose to defend his title, partnering Hamish Stewart. They lost in the quarterfinals to Alberto Barroso Campos and Iñaki Montes de la Torre.

Barroso Campos and Montes de la Torre won the title after defeating David Poljak and Max Westphal 7–5, 7–6^{(7–3)} in the final.

== Seeds ==
1. (Bulgaria) Anthony Genov / (Sweden) Erik Grevelius (quarterfinals)
2. (United Kingdom) Charles Broom / (United Kingdom) James MacKinlay (first round)
3. (Spain) Alberto Barroso Campos / (Spain) Iñaki Montes de la Torre (champions)
4. (Belgium) Michael Geerts / (Czech Republic) Dominik Kellovský (first round)

== Draw ==
Key

- Q = Qualifier
- WC = Wild card
- LL = Lucky loser
- Alt = Alternate
- ITF = ITF entry
- PR = Protected ranking
- SR = Special ranking
- SE = Special exempt
- JE = Junior exempt
- JR = Junior Accelerator Programme entrant
- CO = College Accelerator Programme entrant
- NG = Next Gen Accelerator Program entrant
- w/o = Walkover
- r = Retired
- d = Defaulted

=== Draw ===
First round
1 | (Bulgaria) A Genov (Sweden) E Grevelius | 6 | 6
WC | (Greece) Dimitris Azoidis (Germany) Henri Haupt | 2 | 2
(United Kingdom) M Basing (United Kingdom) James Story | 7 | 6
(Greece) D Sakellaridis (South Africa) Kris van Wyk | 5 | 3
3 | (Spain) A Barroso Campos (Spain) I Montes de la Torre | 6 | 6
WC | (Bulgaria) A Andreev (Greece) Pe Tsitsipas | 2 | 1
(Ivory Coast) E Coulibaly (France) A Escoffier
(United Kingdom) H Stewart (United Kingdom) H Wendelken | w/o
(Romania) GA Boitan (Latvia) R Strombachs | 6 | 2 | [10]
(Portugal) Diogo Marques (Spain) Iván Marrero Curbelo | 4 | 6 | [5]
(Netherlands) J Jans (Netherlands) N Visker | 1 | 6 | [10]
4 | (Belgium) M Geerts (Czech Republic) D Kellovský | 6 | 1 | [8]
(India) Sai Karteek Reddy Ganta (India) K Singh | 7^{7} | 6^{11} | [8]
(Bulgaria) D Kuzmanov (Austria) D Novak | 6^{3} | 7^{13} | [10]
(Czech Republic) D Poljak (France) M Westphal | 7 | 6
2 | (United Kingdom) C Broom (United Kingdom) J MacKinlay | 5 | 1

Quarterfinals
1 | (Bulgaria) A Genov (Sweden) E Grevelius | 7^{8} | 2 | [5]
(United Kingdom) M Basing (United Kingdom) J Story | 6^{6} | 6 | [10]
3 | (Spain) A Barroso Campos (Spain) I Montes de la Torre | 6 | 6
(United Kingdom) H Stewart (United Kingdom) H Wendelken | 2 | 4
(Romania) GA Boitan (Latvia) R Strombachs | 6 | 4 | [4]
(Netherlands) J Jans (Netherlands) N Visker | 3 | 6 | [10]
(Bulgaria) D Kuzmanov (Austria) D Novak
(Czech Republic) D Poljak (France) M Westphal | w/o

Semifinals
(United Kingdom) M Basing (United Kingdom) J Story | 6^{5} | 6 | [7]
3 | (Spain) A Barroso Campos (Spain) I Montes de la Torre | 7^{7} | 4 | [10]
(Netherlands) J Jans (Netherlands) N Visker | 5 | 3
(Czech Republic) D Poljak (France) M Westphal | 7 | 6

Final
3 | (Spain) A Barroso Campos (Spain) I Montes de la Torre | 7 | 7^{7}
(Czech Republic) D Poljak (France) M Westphal | 5 | 6^{3}
