= 2026 Monastir Open II =

- Date: 23 – 29 November
- Edition: 3rd
- Surface: Hard
- Location: Monastir, Tunisia
- Monastir Open

The 2026 Monastir Open II was a professional tennis tournament played on hardcourts. It was the third edition of the tournament which was part of the 2026 ATP Challenger Tour. It took place in Monastir, Tunisia between 23 and 29 November 2026.

== Singles main-draw entrants ==
=== Seeds ===
Country	Player	Rank^{1}	Seed
BEL	Kimmer Coppejans	221	1
ITA	Filippo Romano	256	2
	Petr Bar Biryukov	272	3
ITA	Lorenzo Giustino	286	4
AUT	Sandro Kopp	304	5
USA	Dali Blanch	310	6
ITA	Federico Bondioli	331	7
CIV	Eliakim Coulibaly	335	8

- ^{1} Rankings are as of 16 November 2026.

=== Other entrants ===
The following players received wildcards into the singles main draw:

- (Tunisia) Wissam Abderrahman
- (Sweden) Leo Borg
- (Italy) Giulio Perego

The following player received entry into the singles main draw as an alternate:

- (Switzerland) Nicolás Parizzia

The following players received entry from the qualifying draw:

The following player received entry as a lucky loser:

== Champions ==
=== Singles ===
- vs.

=== Doubles ===
- / vs. /
