= Ethias Province Open =

- 2026 Ethias Province Open

ATP Challenger Tour
- Location: Liège, Belgium
- Category: ATP Challenger Tour
- Surface: Clay

The Ethias Province Open is a professional tennis tournament played on clay courts. It is currently part of the ATP Challenger Tour. It was first held in Liège, Belgium in 2026.

== Past finals ==
=== Singles ===
Year	Champion	Runner-up	Score
2026	(Germany) Florian Broska	(Italy) Lorenzo Giustino	6–7^{(4–7)}, 6–4, 6–1

=== Doubles ===
Year	Champions	Runners-up	Score
2026	Sergey Betov (Chinese Taipei) Jeffrey Hsu	(Belgium) Émilien Demanet (Belgium) Niels Ratiu	7–6^{(7–3)}, 5–7, [13–11]
