= Florian Broska =

German tennis player (born 1998)

- Country (sports): Germany
- Born: 1 January 1998 (age 28) Koblenz, Germany
- Height: 1.75 m (5 ft 9 in)
- Plays: Right-handed
- Prize money: US $101,570

Singles
- Career record: 0–0 (at ATP Tour level, Grand Slam level, and in Davis Cup)
- Career titles: 1 Challenger, 5 ITF
- Highest ranking: No. 284 (27 July 2026)
- Current ranking: No. 317 (19 October 2026)

Doubles
- Career record: 0–0 (at ATP Tour level, Grand Slam level, and in Davis Cup)
- Career titles: 5 ITF
- Highest ranking: No. 479 (9 September 2024)
- Current ranking: No. 776 (19 October 2026)
- Last updated on: 19 October 2026.

Florian Broska (born 1 January 1998) is a German tennis player. Broska has a career high ATP singles ranking of No. 284 achieved on 27 July 2026 and a career high ATP doubles ranking of No. 479 achieved on 9 September 2024.

Broska has won one ATP Challenger singles title at the 2026 Ethias Province Open.

== ATP Challenger finals ==
=== Singles: 1 (1 title) ===
Finals by surface
Hard (–)
Clay (1–0)

Result	W–L	Date	Tournament	Surface	Opponent	Score
Win	1–0	Jul 2026	Ethias Province Open, Belgium	Clay	(Italy) Lorenzo Giustino	6–7^{(4–7)}, 6–4, 6–1
