= Jeffrey Hsu =

Taiwanese tennis player (born 1997)

- Country (sports): Chinese Taipei
- Born: 17 April 1997 (age 29) Saginaw, Michigan, United States
- Height: 1.78 m (5 ft 10 in)
- Plays: Right-handed (two-handed backhand)
- Prize money: US $20,360

Singles
- Career record: 0–0 (at ATP Tour level, Grand Slam level, and in Davis Cup)
- Career titles: 0
- Highest ranking: No. 1,430 (15 August 2022)

Doubles
- Career record: 0–0 (at ATP Tour level, Grand Slam level, and in Davis Cup)
- Career titles: 1 Challenger, 4 ITF
- Highest ranking: No. 289 (13 July 2026)
- Current ranking: No. 289 (13 July 2026)
- Last updated on: 13 July 2026.

Jeffrey Hsu, sometimes known as Hsu Chuan-en, (born 17 April 1997) is an American-born Taiwanese tennis player. Hsu has a career high ATP singles ranking of No. 1,430 achieved on 15 August 2022 and a career high ATP doubles ranking of No. 289 achieved on 13 July 2026.

Hsu has won one ATP Challenger doubles title at the 2026 Ethias Province Open.
