= Max Westphal =

French tennis player

- Country (sports): France
- Born: 4 June 2003 (age 22)
- Plays: Right-handed
- College: Columbia University
- Prize money: US $15,549

Singles
- Career record: 0–0
- Career titles: 0
- Highest ranking: No. 1,764 (19 May 2025)

Doubles
- Career record: 0–0
- Career titles: 0
- Highest ranking: No. 222 (16 March 2026)
- Current ranking: No. 222 (16 March 2026)
- Last updated on: 16 March 2026.

Max Westphal (born 4 June 2003) is a French tennis player who specializes in doubles. He has a career-high ATP doubles ranking of No. 222 achieved on 16 March 2026 and a singles ranking of No. 1,764 reached on 19 May 2025.

Westphal plays mostly on the ATP Challenger Tour, where he won one title at the 2025 Monastir Open.

== Junior career ==
In 2017, Westphal went from 77th to 6th place in the European U-14 Junior Rankings after reaching the final of the Tim Essonne, one of the most prestigious trophies in the U-14 circuit of the Tennis Europe Junior Tour. He later stated: "My good result at the Tim Essonne allowed me to have confidence in my game, and to have a better mentality".

In September 2021, Westphal won the boys' doubles category at the US Open, with Coleman Wong. The pair defeated eight seeds Viacheslav Bielinskyi and Petr Nesterov in the final.

He reached an ITF junior combined ranking of No. 24 on 25 January 2021.

== College ==
Westphal studied and played tennis at Columbia University.

== Professional career ==
In October 2025, Westphal reached his first ATP Challenger final, in the doubles category at the Crete Challenger, partnering with David Poljak. Later that month, he earned his first Challenger doubles title, at the Monastir Open, playing alongside compatriot Corentin Denolly.

== ATP Challenger Tour finals ==
=== Doubles: 2 (1 title, 1 runner-up) ===
Legend ATP Challenger Tour (1–1)	Finals by surface Hard (1–1) Clay (–)

Result	W–L	Date	Tournament	Tier	Surface	Partner	Opponents	Score
Loss	0–1	Oct 2025	Crete Challenger V, Greece	Challenger	Hard	(Czech Republic) David Poljak	(Spain) Alberto Barroso Campos (Spain) Iñaki Montes de la Torre	5–7, 6–7^{(3–7)}
Win	1–1	Oct 2025	Monastir Open, Tunisia	Challenger	Hard	(France) Corentin Denolly	(Serbia) Stefan Latinović (Croatia) Luka Mikrut	7–5, 2–6, [10–6]

== Junior Grand Slam finals ==
=== Doubles: 1 (title) ===
Result	Year	Tournament	Surface	Partner	Opponents	Score
Win	2021	US Open	Hard	(Hong Kong) Coleman Wong	(Ukraine) Viacheslav Bielinskyi (Bulgaria) Petr Nesterov	6–3, 5–7, [10–1]
