= Monastir Open =

- 2025 Monastir Open

ATP Challenger Tour
- Location: Monastir, Tunisia
- Category: ATP Challenger Tour
- Surface: Hard
- Prize money: $60,000

The Monastir Open is a professional tennis tournament played on hardcourts. It is currently part of the ATP Challenger Tour. It was first held in Monastir, Tunisia in 2025.

== Past finals ==
=== Singles ===
Year	Champion	Runner-up	Score
2025	(Italy) Lorenzo Giustino	(Czech Republic) Petr Brunclík	7–5, 6–0
2026 (1)	(Switzerland) Kilian Feldbausch	(Germany) Marvin Möller	6–1, 6–2

=== Doubles ===
Year	Champions	Runners-up	Score
2025	(France) Corentin Denolly (France) Max Westphal	(Serbia) Stefan Latinović (Croatia) Luka Mikrut	7–5, 2–6, [10–6]
2026 (1)	(Czech Republic) Filip Duda (Portugal) Tiago Pereira	(United Kingdom) James MacKinlay (India) Jeevan Nedunchezhiyan	7–6^{(7–1)}, 7–6^{(7–2)}
