= Lorenzo Giustino =

Italian tennis player (born 1991)

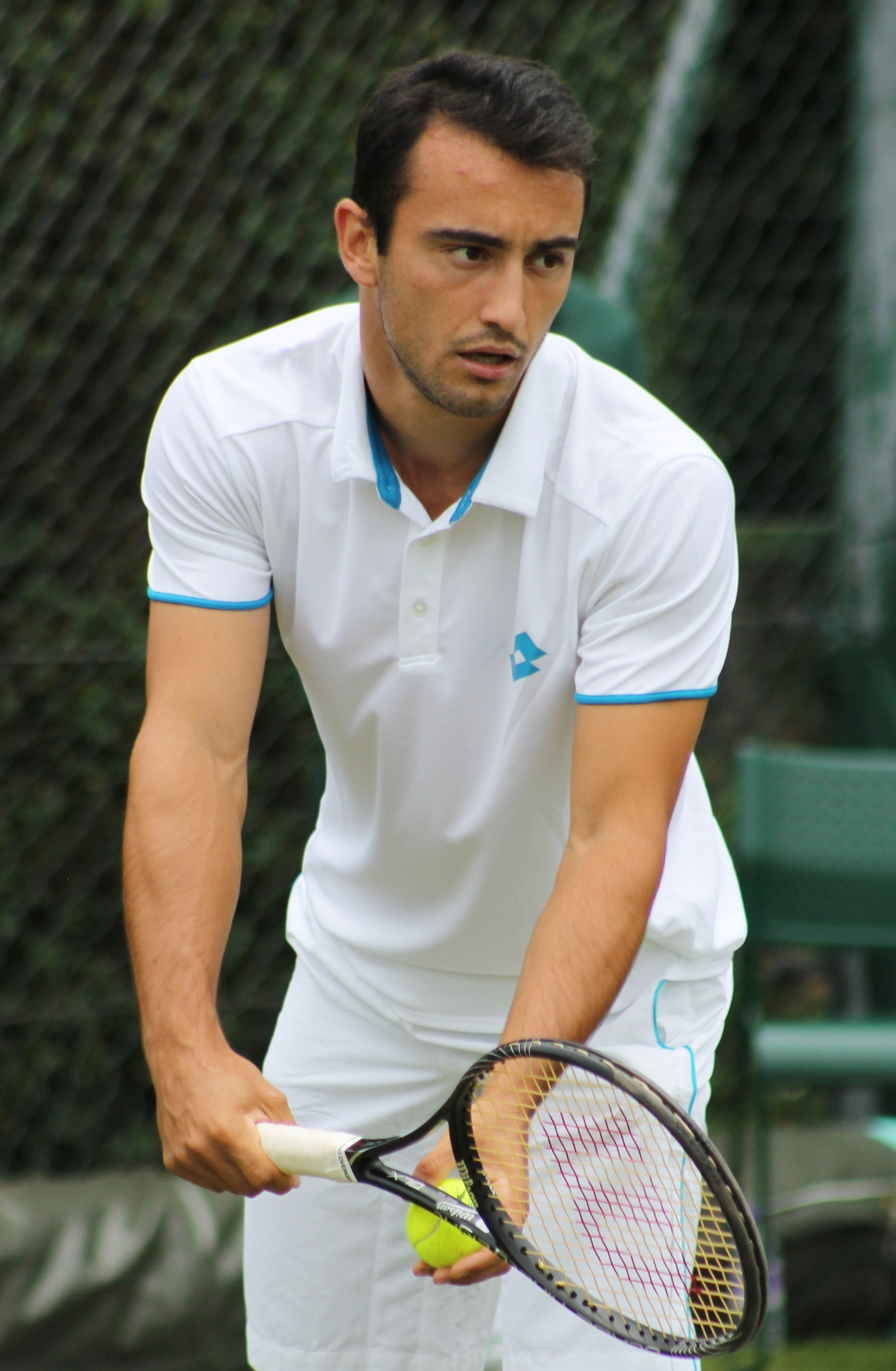
- Giustino at the 2014 Wimbledon Championships
- Full name: Lorenzo Giustino
- Country (sports): Italy
- Residence: Barcelona, Spain
- Born: 10 September 1991 (age 35) Naples, Italy
- Height: 1.80 m (5 ft 11 in)
- Turned pro: 2007
- Plays: Right-handed (two–handed backhand)
- Coach: Jose Maria Diaz
- Prize money: US $1,194,382

Singles
- Career record: 1–7
- Career titles: 2 Challenger
- Highest ranking: No. 127 (12 August 2019)
- Current ranking: No. 286 (16 November 2026)

Grand Slam singles results
- Australian Open: 1R (2020)
- French Open: 2R (2020)
- Wimbledon: Q1 (2014, 2017, 2019, 2021, 2022, 2026)
- US Open: Q3 (2016, 2018)

Doubles
- Career record: 0–0
- Career titles: 1 Challenger
- Highest ranking: No. 311 (15 April 2019)
- Last updated on: 19 November 2026.

Lorenzo Giustino (Italian pronunciation: [loˈrɛntso dʒuˈstiːno]; born 10 September 1991) is an Italian tennis player. He has a career-high ATP singles ranking of world No. 127 achieved on 12 August 2019 and a career-high ATP doubles ranking of No. 311 achieved on 15 April 2019. Giustino has won two singles titles and one doubles title on the ATP Challenger Tour.

== Career ==
Giustino made his ATP main-draw debut as a qualifier at the 2015 BRD Năstase Țiriac Trophy, where he lost to fifth seed Guillermo García López in the first round.

In June 2019, he won his first ATP Challenger singles title in Almaty, defeating Federico Coria in the final.

Giustino made his Grand Slam main-draw debut at the 2020 Australian Open, losing to Milos Raonic in the first round.

Giustino defeated Corentin Moutet 0–6, 7–6 (7), 7–6 (3), 2–6, 18–16 in the first round of 2020 French Open as a first time main-draw qualifier at this Major. The match was the second-longest in French Open history, lasting six hours and five minutes. It was Giustino's first ATP tour-level win. He lost to 12th seed Diego Schwartzman in the second round.

Giustino played in his first ATP 500 tournament at the 2021 Dubai Tennis Championships as a lucky loser receiving a bye into the second round after the withdrawal of 10th seed Borna Ćorić. He lost to Aljaž Bedene.

He qualified for his second ATP 500 at the 2023 Barcelona Open Banc Sabadell, losing to Alexander Shevchenko in the first round.

Giustino won his second ATP Challenger singles title at the 2025 Monastir Open, defeating Petr Brunclík in the final.

== Performance timeline ==
Key
W	F	SF	QF	#R	RR	Q#	DNQ	A	NH

(W) winner; (F) finalist; (SF) semifinalist; (QF) quarterfinalist; (#R) rounds 4, 3, 2, 1; (RR) round-robin stage; (Q#) qualification round; (DNQ) did not qualify; (A) absent; (NH) not held; (SR) strike rate (events won / competed); (W–L) win–loss record.
To avoid confusion and double counting, these charts are updated at the conclusion of a tournament or when the player's participation has ended.

=== Singles ===
Tournament	2014	2015	2016	2017	2018	2019	2020	2021	2022	2023	2024	2025	2026	W–L
Grand Slam tournaments
Australian Open	Q2	A	Q2	Q1	Q1	Q1	1R	Q2	Q1	A	A	A	Q1	0–1
French Open	Q2	A	A	Q1	A	Q1	2R	Q1	Q2	Q1	A	A	Q1	1–1
Wimbledon	Q1	A	A	Q1	A	Q1	NH	Q1	Q1	A	A	A	Q1	0–0
US Open	A	A	Q3	Q1	Q3	Q1	A	Q1	A	A	A	A	Q1	0–0
Win–loss	0–0	0–0	0–0	0–0	0–0	0–0	1–2	0–0	0–0	0–0	0–0	0–0	0–0	1–2
ATP Masters 1000
Miami Open	A	A	A	A	A	A	NH	Q1	A	A	A	A	A	0–0
Italian Open	A	A	Q1	A	A	A	A	A	A	A	A	A	A	0–0
Shanghai	A	A	A	A	A	A	NH			Q1	A	A		0–0
Paris	A	A	A	A	A	A	A	A	A	A	A	A		0–0
Win–loss	0–0	0–0	0–0	0–0	0–0	0–0	0–0	0–0	0–0	0–0	0–0	0–0	0–0	0–0

== Challenger and Futures finals ==
=== Singles: 33 (15–18) ===
Legend (singles) ATP Challenger Tour (2–5) ITF Futures Tour (13–13)	Titles by surface Hard (2–5) Clay (13–13) Grass (0–0) Carpet (0–0)

Result	W–L	Date	Tournament	Tier	Surface	Opponent	Score
Loss	0–1	May 2012	Spain F10, Balaguer	Futures	Clay	(Venezuela) David Souto	4–6, 4–6
Loss	0–2	Jun 2012	Turkey F23, Tekirdağ	Futures	Hard	(Australia) Brydan Klein	3–6, 1–6
Win	1–2	Jun 2012	Turkey F25, İzmir	Futures	Clay	(Australia) Jason Kubler	6–4, 3–6, 7–5
Win	2–2	Mar 2013	Turkey F10, Antalya	Futures	Clay	(Italy) Simone Vagnozzi	6–0, 6–3
Loss	2–3	Apr 2013	Spain F10, Les Franqueses del Vallès	Futures	Hard	(Spain) Iván Arenas-Gualda	w/o
Loss	2–4	May 2013	Italy F6, Pozzuoli	Futures	Clay	(Italy) Matteo Trevisan	5–7, 2–6
Loss	2–5	Mar 2014	Spain F5, Reus	Futures	Clay	(Spain) Jordi Samper Montaña	3–6, 6–4, 5–7
Win	3–5	Aug 2015	Italy F20, Pontedera	Futures	Clay	(Italy) Gianluca Mager	7–6^{(7–3)}, 6–3
Win	4–5	Oct 2015	France F23, Rodez	Futures	Hard (i)	(France) Grégoire Barrère	6–3, 6–7^{(2–7)}, 6–1
Win	5–5	Jun 2016	Italy F16, Basilicanova	Futures	Clay	(Italy) Walter Trusendi	6–4, 6–4
Win	6–5	Jul 2016	France F13, Bourg-en-Bresse	Futures	Clay	(France) Romain Jouan	6–4, 6–2
Win	7–5	Sep 2016	Serbia F7, Niš	Futures	Clay	(Croatia) Kristijan Mesaroš	3–6, 6–2, 6–4
Loss	7–6	Sep 2016	Sibiu, Romania	Challenger	Clay	(Netherlands) Robin Haase	6–7^{(2–7)}, 2–6
Loss	7–7	Apr 2017	Italy F6, Santa Margherita di Pula	Futures	Clay	(Czech Republic) Václav Šafránek	6–7^{(2–7)}, 7–6^{(9–7)}, 5–7
Loss	7–8	Jan 2018	Spain F2, Manacor	Futures	Clay	(Spain) Daniel Muñoz de la Nava	4–6, 7–5, 3–6
Win	8–8	Mar 2018	Italy F5, Santa Margherita di Pula	Futures	Clay	(Uruguay) Martín Cuevas	7–5, 7–5
Win	9–8	Apr 2018	Italy F7, Santa Margherita di Pula	Futures	Clay	(Italy) Gianluca Mager	6–4, 6–1
Loss	9–9	Feb 2019	Launceston, Australia	Challenger	Hard	(South Africa) Lloyd Harris	2–6, 2–6
Loss	9–10	Mar 2019	Zhangjiagang, China, P.R.	Challenger	Hard	(Australia) Marc Polmans	4–6, 6–4, 6–7^{(4–7)}
Win	10-10	Jun 2019	Almaty, Kazakhstan	Challenger	Clay	(Argentina) Federico Coria	6–4, 6–4
Loss	10–11	May 2022	Prague, Czech Republic	Challenger	Clay	(Argentina) Pedro Cachin	3-6, 6-7^{(4-7)}
Win	11–11	Mar 2024	M25 Badalona, Spain	World Tennis Tour	Clay	(Spain) Alex Marti Pujolras	3–6, 6–4, 6–3
Loss	11–12	May 2024	M25 Mataro, Spain	World Tennis Tour	Clay	(Netherlands) Guy den Ouden	6–1, 5–7, 6–0
Loss	11–13	Jun 2024	M25 Bourg-en-Bresse, France	World Tennis Tour	Clay	Marat Sharipov	2–6, 3–6
Win	12–13	Sep 2024	M25 Sabadell, Spain	World Tennis Tour	Clay	(Spain) Nicolás Álvarez Varona	7–5, 3–6, 6–2
Loss	12–14	Nov 2024	M25 Monastir, Tunisia	World Tennis Tour	Hard	(Belgium) Gauthier Onclin	4–6, 6–2, 5–7
Win	13–14	Mar 2025	M25 Badalona, Spain	World Tennis Tour	Clay	(Spain) Pol Martín Tiffon	6–2, 2–6, 7–6^{(7–4)}
Loss	13–15	May 2025	M25 Vic, Spain	World Tennis Tour	Clay	(France) Clément Tabur	4–6, 6–7^{(2–7)}
Loss	13–16	Jun 2025	M25 Villeneuve-Loubet, France	World Tennis Tour	Clay	(Switzerland) Remy Bertola	6–7^{(3–7)}, 1–6
Win	14–16	Aug 2025	M25 Gijón, Spain	World Tennis Tour	Clay	(Spain) Pedro Vives Marcos	6–1, 7–5
Loss	14–17	Aug 2025	M25 Santander, Spain	World Tennis Tour	Clay	(Spain) Javier Barranco Cosano	3–6, 0–4 ret.
Win	15-17	Nov 2025	Monastir, Tunisia	Challenger	Hard	(Czech Republic) Petr Brunclík	7–5, 6–0
Loss	15-18	Jul 2026	Liège, Belgium	Challenger	Clay	(Germany) Florian Broska	7–6^{(7–4)}, 4–6, 1–6

=== Doubles: 6 (3–3) ===
Legend (doubles) ATP Challenger Tour (1–0) ITF Futures Tour (2–3)	Titles by surface Hard (0–1) Clay (3–2) Grass (0–0) Carpet (0–0)

Result	W–L	Date	Tournament	Tier	Surface	Partner	Opponents	Score
Win	1–0	Jul 2009	Italy F18, Carpi	Futures	Clay	(Italy) Paolo Beninca	(Italy) Jacopo Marchegiani (Italy) Alessandro Sarra	6–4, 6–4
Loss	1–1	Dec 2012	Turkey F48, Antalya	Futures	Hard	(Spain) Guillermo Olaso	(Moldova) Andrei Ciumac (Ukraine) Volodymyr Uzhylovskyi	2–6, 6–4, [7–10]
Loss	1–2	Jun 2013	Spain F15, Madrid	Futures	Clay	(Germany) Richard Becker	(United Kingdom) Oliver Golding (United Kingdom) Alexander Ward	3–6, 6–2, [5–10]
Loss	1–3	Aug 2014	Italy F28, Este	Futures	Clay	(Portugal) Fred Gil	(Italy) Francesco Picco (Italy) Walter Trusendi	4–6, 6–7^{(8–10)}
Win	2–3	Jan 2018	Spain F2, Manacor	Futures	Clay	(Spain) David Vega Hernández	(Italy) Pietro Rondoni (Italy) Jacopo Stefanini	7–5, 7–5
Win	3–3	Jun 2018	Shymkent, Kazakhstan	Challenger	Clay	(Portugal) Gonçalo Oliveira	(Austria) Lucas Miedler (Austria) Sebastian Ofner	6–2, 7–6^{(7–4)}
