= 2020 Australian Open – Women's singles qualifying =

Women's singles qualifying
- 2020 Australian Open

Events
Singles	men	women		boys	girls
Doubles	men	women	mixed	boys	girls
WC Singles	men	women	quad
WC Doubles	men	women	quad
Legends	men	women	mixed

Qualification
Singles	men	women
- Australian Open

This article displays the qualifying draw for women's singles at the 2020 Australian Open.

== Seeds ==
1. (Romania) Ana Bogdan (qualifying competition)
2. (Japan) Nao Hibino (qualified)
3. (Russia) Varvara Gracheva (qualifying competition)
4. (Ukraine) Katarina Zavatska (second round)
5. (Russia) Anna Kalinskaya (qualified)
6. (Russia) Natalia Vikhlyantseva (qualifying competition)
7. (Romania) Patricia Maria Țig (first round)
8. (Spain) Aliona Bolsova (second round)
9. (Belgium) Ysaline Bonaventure (second round)
10. (United States) Catherine McNally (qualified)
11. (Switzerland) Stefanie Vögele (qualifying competition)
12. (Russia) Liudmila Samsonova (qualified)
13. (Belgium) Greet Minnen (qualified)
14. (United States) Francesca Di Lorenzo (second round)
15. (United States) Nicole Gibbs (second round)
16. (Russia) Varvara Flink (second round)
17. (Poland) Katarzyna Kawa (first round)
18. (Slovenia) Kaja Juvan (qualified)
19. (Czech Republic) Barbora Krejčíková (qualified)
20. (Romania) Monica Niculescu (qualified)
21. (Australia) Maddison Inglis (second round)
22. (United States) Usue Maitane Arconada (first round)
23. (Czech Republic) Tereza Martincová (qualifying competition)
24. (China) Wang Xiyu (Qualifying competition)
25. (Germany) Anna-Lena Friedsam (first round)
26. (United States) Whitney Osuigwe (first round)
27. (Japan) Kurumi Nara (second round)
28. (United States) Allie Kiick (second round)
29. (Luxembourg) Mandy Minella (second round)
30. (United States) Caroline Dolehide (qualifying competition)
31. (United States) Ann Li (qualified)
32. (Austria) Barbara Haas (qualifying competition)

== Qualifiers ==
1. (United States) Ann Li
2. (Japan) Nao Hibino
3. (Sweden) Johanna Larsson
4. (Czech Republic) Barbora Krejčíková
5. (Russia) Anna Kalinskaya
6. (Slovenia) Kaja Juvan
7. (Canada) Leylah Fernandez
8. (United States) Shelby Rogers
9. (Italy) Martina Trevisan
10. (United States) Catherine McNally
11. (Romania) Monica Niculescu
12. (Russia) Liudmila Samsonova
13. (Belgium) Greet Minnen
14. (Italy) Elisabetta Cocciaretto
15. (United Kingdom) Harriet Dart
16. (Germany) Antonia Lottner

== Draw ==
=== First qualifier ===
First round
1	(Romania) Ana Bogdan	7^{7}	6
WC	(Australia) Ivana Popovic	6^{5}	4
WC	(Australia) Olivia Tjandramulia	0	3
WC	(Australia) Belinda Woolcock	6	6
WC	(Australia) Ellen Perez	6^{7}	1
(Belgium) Yanina Wickmayer	7^{9}	6
(Egypt) Mayar Sherif	3	5
31	(United States) Ann Li	6	7

Second round
1	(Romania) Ana Bogdan	6	6
WC	(Australia) Belinda Woolcock	2	3
(Belgium) Yanina Wickmayer	3	2
31	(United States) Ann Li	6	6

Qualifying competition
1	(Romania) Ana Bogdan	7	6^{9}	2
31	(United States) Ann Li	5	7^{11}	6

=== Second qualifier ===
First round
2	(Japan) Nao Hibino	6	4	6
(Chinese Taipei) Liang En-shuo	1	6	3
(United Kingdom) Samantha Murray Sharan	6	4	2
(China) Yuan Yue	2	6	6
(Netherlands) Indy de Vroome	3	3
(Spain) Lara Arruabarrena	6	6
(Japan) Yuki Naito	6	7
25	(Germany) Anna-Lena Friedsam	3	5

Second round
2	(Japan) Nao Hibino	3	6	6
(China) Yuan Yue	6	1	1
(Spain) Lara Arruabarrena	6	6
(Japan) Yuki Naito	3	4

Qualifying competition
2	(Japan) Nao Hibino	6	6
(Spain) Lara Arruabarrena	1	2

=== Third qualifier ===
First round
3	(Russia) Varvara Gracheva	6	6
(France) Chloé Paquet	2	1
(Serbia) Olga Danilović	3	6	7^{10}
(Serbia) Jovana Jović	6	3	6^{8}
(Sweden) Johanna Larsson	6	6
(Poland) Urszula Radwańska	3	1
(France) Jessika Ponchet	2	5
29	(Luxembourg) Mandy Minella	6	7

Second round
3	(Russia) Varvara Gracheva	6	4	6
(Serbia) Olga Danilović	2	6	1
(Sweden) Johanna Larsson	6	6
29	(Luxembourg) Mandy Minella	2	3

Qualifying competition
3	(Russia) Varvara Gracheva	5	3
(Sweden) Johanna Larsson	7	6

=== Fourth qualifier ===
First round
4	(Ukraine) Katarina Zavatska	6	0	6
(China) Ma Shuyue	3	6	2
(Brazil) Gabriela Cé	0	1
(United States) Sachia Vickery	6	6
(United States) Varvara Lepchenko	6	6
PR	(Turkey) Başak Eraydın	1	1
(Hungary) Anna Bondár	4	0
19	(Czech Republic) Barbora Krejčíková	6	6

Second round
4	(Ukraine) Katarina Zavatska	4	7	4
(United States) Sachia Vickery	6	5	6
(United States) Varvara Lepchenko	4	4
19	(Czech Republic) Barbora Krejčíková	6	6

Qualifying competition
(United States) Sachia Vickery	3	0
19	(Czech Republic) Barbora Krejčíková	6	6

=== Fifth qualifier ===
First round
5	(Russia) Anna Kalinskaya	6	1	6
(Italy) Sara Errani	2	6	2
(Romania) Irina Bara	6^{6}	2
(Romania) Laura Ioana Paar	7^{8}	6
(China) Wang Xinyu	3	6	7^{10}
PR	(United States) Irina Falconi	6	2	6^{8}
(Hungary) Réka Luca Jani	5	3
28	(United States) Allie Kiick	7	6

Second round
5	(Russia) Anna Kalinskaya	6	7^{7}
(Romania) Laura Ioana Paar	4	6^{3}
(China) Wang Xinyu	6	6
28	(United States) Allie Kiick	0	1

Qualifying competition
5	(Russia) Anna Kalinskaya	4	7^{7}	6
(China) Wang Xinyu	6	6^{2}	2

=== Sixth qualifier ===
First round
6	(Russia) Natalia Vikhlyantseva	7	6
(Ukraine) Marta Kostyuk	5	2
(Poland) Maja Chwalińska	0	5
(Bulgaria) Isabella Shinikova	6	7
WC	(Australia) Storm Sanders	6	6
(United States) Robin Anderson	2	0
(Georgia (country)) Ekaterine Gorgodze	1	0
18	(Slovenia) Kaja Juvan	6	6

Second round
6	(Russia) Natalia Vikhlyantseva	6	6
(Bulgaria) Isabella Shinikova	2	3
WC	(Australia) Storm Sanders	0	6	3
18	(Slovenia) Kaja Juvan	6	2	6

Qualifying competition
6	(Russia) Natalia Vikhlyantseva	3	3
18	(Slovenia) Kaja Juvan	6	6

=== Seventh qualifier ===
First round
7	(Romania) Patricia Maria Țig	2	3
(Canada) Leylah Fernandez	6	6
(Poland) Magdalena Fręch	2	6	4
(Japan) Mayo Hibi	6	4	6
(Paraguay) Verónica Cepede Royg	2	6^{4}
(United States) Danielle Lao	6	7^{7}
(Slovakia) Jana Čepelová	4	0^{r}
27	(Japan) Kurumi Nara	6	3

Second round
(Canada) Leylah Fernandez	6	6
(Japan) Mayo Hibi	4	4
(United States) Danielle Lao	7	6^{2}	6
27	(Japan) Kurumi Nara	5	7^{7}	3

Qualifying competition
(Canada) Leylah Fernandez	7	7
(United States) Danielle Lao	5	5

=== Eighth qualifier ===
First round
8	(Spain) Aliona Bolsova	6	6
(Turkey) Pemra Özgen	2	3
(United States) Shelby Rogers	6	6
(Germany) Mona Barthel	4	0
(Belarus) Olga Govortsova	7	7
WC	(Australia) Abbie Myers	5	5
(Georgia (country)) Mariam Bolkvadze	3	2
30	(United States) Caroline Dolehide	6	6

Second round
8	(Spain) Aliona Bolsova	4	3
(United States) Shelby Rogers	6	6
(Belarus) Olga Govortsova	3	4
30	(United States) Caroline Dolehide	6	6

Qualifying competition
(United States) Shelby Rogers	6	6
30	(United States) Caroline Dolehide	4	4

=== Ninth qualifier ===
First round
9	(Belgium) Ysaline Bonaventure	6	7
WC	(France) Diane Parry	2	5
(Romania) Jaqueline Cristian	2	2
(Italy) Martina Trevisan	6	6
(Canada) Eugenie Bouchard	4	7^{7}	6
(China) You Xiaodi	6	6^{4}	1
(Slovakia) Rebecca Šramková	3	6	6^{17}
21	(Australia) Maddison Inglis	6	0	7^{19}

Second round
9	(Belgium) Ysaline Bonaventure	0	2
(Italy) Martina Trevisan	6	6
(Canada) Eugenie Bouchard	6	6
21	(Australia) Maddison Inglis	3	1

Qualifying competition
(Italy) Martina Trevisan	6	6
(Canada) Eugenie Bouchard	4	3

=== Tenth qualifier ===
First round
10	(United States) Caty McNally	6	0	6
(United States) Asia Muhammad	4	6	2
PR	(Ukraine) Daria Lopatetska	6	6
(Switzerland) Conny Perrin	2	2
WC	(Australia) Olivia Rogowska	4	2
(Spain) Nuria Párrizas Díaz	6	6
(Romania) Elena-Gabriela Ruse	6^{5}	7	6
22	(United States) Usue Maitane Arconada	7^{7}	5	4

Second round
10	(United States) Caty McNally	6	6
PR	(Ukraine) Daria Lopatetska	2	3
(Spain) Nuria Párrizas Díaz	3	5
(Romania) Elena-Gabriela Ruse	6	7

Qualifying competition
10	(United States) Caty McNally	6	6
(Romania) Elena-Gabriela Ruse	1	1

=== Eleventh qualifier ===
First round
11	(Switzerland) Stefanie Vögele	4	6
(Slovenia) Dalila Jakupović	6	5^{r}
(Czech Republic) Denisa Šátralová	6	6
(China) Han Xinyun	2	1
(Bulgaria) Viktoriya Tomova	6	7^{7}
(India) Ankita Raina	2	6^{2}
(Ukraine) Anhelina Kalinina	6^{7}	2
20	(Romania) Monica Niculescu	7^{9}	6

Second round
11	(Switzerland) Stefanie Vögele	3	6	6
(Czech Republic) Denisa Šátralová	6	1	2
(Bulgaria) Viktoriya Tomova	6	1	4
20	(Romania) Monica Niculescu	1	6	6

Qualifying competition
11	(Switzerland) Stefanie Vögele	2	6	4
20	(Romania) Monica Niculescu	6	3	6

=== Twelfth qualifier ===
First round
12	(Russia) Liudmila Samsonova	6	6
(China) Lu Jiajing	1	0
(Japan) Kyōka Okamura	1	4
(United States) Hailey Baptiste	6	6
(Colombia) Camila Osorio	2	6	6
(Serbia) Natalija Kostić	6	1	1
(Netherlands) Richèl Hogenkamp	3	2
24	(China) Wang Xiyu	6	6

Second round
12	(Russia) Liudmila Samsonova	1	6	6
(United States) Hailey Baptiste	6	2	2
(Colombia) Camila Osorio	1	4
24	(China) Wang Xiyu	6	6

Qualifying competition
12	(Russia) Liudmila Samsonova	6	2	7
24	(China) Wang Xiyu	4	6	5

=== Thirteenth qualifier ===
First round
13	(Belgium) Greet Minnen	6	2	6
(Australia) Kaylah McPhee	3	6	3
(China) Xun Fangying	6^{5}	6	6
WC	(Australia) Jaimee Fourlis	7^{7}	3	4
(Spain) Eva Guerrero Álvarez	1	6^{5}
(Netherlands) Lesley Pattinama Kerkhove	6	7^{7}
(Slovakia) Kristína Kučová	6	4	4
32	(Austria) Barbara Haas	2	6	6

Second round
13	(Belgium) Greet Minnen	6	6
(China) Xun Fangying	3	1
(Netherlands) Lesley Pattinama Kerkhove	4	6	1
32	(Austria) Barbara Haas	6	4	6

Qualifying competition
13	(Belgium) Greet Minnen	6	6
32	(Austria) Barbara Haas	2	1

=== Fourteenth qualifier ===
First round
14	(United States) Francesca Di Lorenzo	6	6
(Austria) Julia Grabher	3	2
(Italy) Elisabetta Cocciaretto	6^{4}	7	6
(Netherlands) Bibiane Schoofs	7^{7}	5	3
(Russia) Valeria Savinykh	6	6
(United Kingdom) Naiktha Bains	2	2
(Serbia) Aleksandra Krunić	1	1
23	(Czech Republic) Tereza Martincová	6	6

Second round
14	(United States) Francesca Di Lorenzo	3	1
(Italy) Elisabetta Cocciaretto	6	6
(Russia) Valeria Savinykh	1	7	4
23	(Czech Republic) Tereza Martincová	6	5	6

Qualifying competition
(Italy) Elisabetta Cocciaretto	6	6
23	(Czech Republic) Tereza Martincová	2	1

=== Fifteenth qualifier ===
First round
15	(United States) Nicole Gibbs	6	2	7
(Spain) Cristina Bucșa	0	6	5
(Bulgaria) Elitsa Kostova	4	1
(United Kingdom) Harriet Dart	6	6
(Italy) Giulia Gatto-Monticone	6	6
(China) Liu Fangzhou	2	0
(Italy) Martina Di Giuseppe	3	6	6
26	(United States) Whitney Osuigwe	6	4	1

Second round
15	(United States) Nicole Gibbs	2	3
(United Kingdom) Harriet Dart	6	6
(Italy) Giulia Gatto-Monticone	6	6
(Italy) Martina Di Giuseppe	3	3

Qualifying competition
(United Kingdom) Harriet Dart	6	6
(Italy) Giulia Gatto-Monticone	1	3

=== Sixteenth qualifier ===
First round
16	(Russia) Varvara Flink	7^{7}	6
(France) Océane Dodin	6^{3}	3
(Australia) Destanee Aiava	6	6
(Russia) Kamilla Rakhimova	4	2
(Russia) Marina Melnikova	1	7	4
(Japan) Chihiro Muramatsu	6	5	6
(Germany) Antonia Lottner	6	6
17	(Poland) Katarzyna Kawa	2	1

Second round
16	(Russia) Varvara Flink	1	7^{7}	4
(Australia) Destanee Aiava	6	6^{3}	6
(Japan) Chihiro Muramatsu	3	7	2
(Germany) Antonia Lottner	6	5	6

Qualifying competition
(Australia) Destanee Aiava	4	2
(Germany) Antonia Lottner	6	6
