= 2020 Australian Open – Men's singles qualifying =

Men's singles qualifying
- 2020 Australian Open

Events
| Singles | men | women | | boys | girls |
| Doubles | men | women | mixed | boys | girls |
| WC Singles | men | women | quad |
| WC Doubles | men | women | quad |
| Legends | men | women | mixed |

Qualification
| Singles | men | women |
- Australian Open

This article displays the qualifying draw for men's singles at the 2020 Australian Open.

== Seeds ==
1. (Austria) Dennis Novak (qualified)
2. (Switzerland) Henri Laaksonen (first round)
3. (Canada) Brayden Schnur (second round)
4. (Finland) Emil Ruusuvuori (second round)
5. (Slovakia) Andrej Martin (second round)
6. (Russia) Evgeny Donskoy (qualifying competition, lucky loser)
7. (United States) Denis Kudla (second round)
8. (Japan) Taro Daniel (first round)
9. (Japan) Go Soeda (first round)
10. (Slovakia) Norbert Gombos (qualified)
11. (Italy) Thomas Fabbiano (first round)
12. (Italy) Paolo Lorenzi (second round)
13. (Italy) Gianluca Mager (second round)
14. (France) Antoine Hoang (first round)
15. (Argentina) Federico Coria (second round)
16. (Germany) Peter Gojowczyk (qualified)
17. (India) Prajnesh Gunneswaran (qualifying competition, lucky loser)
18. (Germany) Yannick Maden (second round)
19. (Chinese Taipei) Jason Jung (second round)
20. (South Korea) Chung Hyeon (withdrew)
21. (India) Sumit Nagal (first round)
22. (United States) Bradley Klahn (first round)
23. (Canada) Steven Diez (second round)
24. (Argentina) Facundo Bagnis (second round)
25. (China) Zhang Zhizhen (first round)
26. (Slovakia) Jozef Kovalík (qualifying competition, lucky loser)
27. (Portugal) Pedro Sousa (first round)
28. (Israel) Dudi Sela (first round, retired)
29. (Peru) Juan Pablo Varillas (second round)
30. (Slovakia) Martin Kližan (first round)
31. (Slovenia) Blaž Rola (first round)
32. (Italy) Alessandro Giannessi (first round)

== Qualifiers ==
1. (Austria) Dennis Novak
2. (Netherlands) Tallon Griekspoor
3. (United States) Christopher Eubanks
4. (France) Elliot Benchetrit
5. (Spain) Mario Vilella Martínez
6. (Egypt) Mohamed Safwat
7. (Belarus) Ilya Ivashka
8. (France) Quentin Halys
9. (Argentina) Marco Trungelliti
10. (Slovakia) Norbert Gombos
11. (Colombia) Daniel Elahi Galán
12. (Spain) Pedro Martínez
13. (Australia) Max Purcell
14. (Chile) Alejandro Tabilo
15. (Latvia) Ernests Gulbis
16. (Germany) Peter Gojowczyk

== Lucky losers ==
1. (Russia) Evgeny Donskoy
2. (India) Prajnesh Gunneswaran
3. (Slovakia) Jozef Kovalík
4. (Italy) Lorenzo Giustino

== Draw ==
=== First qualifier ===
First round
1 | (Austria) Dennis Novak | 6 | 6
(Germany) Dustin Brown | 3 | 2
(Spain) Roberto Ortega Olmedo | 6 | 5 | 4
(Slovakia) Filip Horanský | 4 | 7 | 6
(Japan) Hiroki Moriya | 7^{7} | 7
(United States) Noah Rubin | 6^{3} | 5
(Barbados) Darian King | 2 | 2
23 | (Canada) Steven Diez | 6 | 6

Second round
1 | (Austria) Dennis Novak | 6 | 6
(Slovakia) Filip Horanský | 1 | 4
(Japan) Hiroki Moriya | 6 | 7
23 | (Canada) Steven Diez | 4 | 5

Qualifying competition
1 | (Austria) Dennis Novak | 7^{7} | 6
(Japan) Hiroki Moriya | 6^{5} | 2

=== Second qualifier ===
First round
2 | (Switzerland) Henri Laaksonen | 6^{0} | 6^{3}
WC | (Australia) Rinky Hijikata | 7^{7} | 7^{7}
(Netherlands) Tallon Griekspoor | 6 | 6
(Spain) Guillermo García López | 3 | 2
(Chinese Taipei) Wu Tung-lin | 6 | 6^{1} | 6^{8}
(Romania) Marius Copil | 3 | 7^{7} | 7^{10}
WC | (Italy) Lorenzo Musetti | 6 | 6
Alt | (Israel) Amir Weintraub | 2 | 1

Second round
WC | (Australia) Rinky Hijikata | 5 | 5
(Netherlands) Tallon Griekspoor | 7 | 7
(Romania) Marius Copil | 7^{8} | 4 | 5
WC | (Italy) Lorenzo Musetti | 6^{6} | 6 | 7

Qualifying competition
(Netherlands) Tallon Griekspoor | 6 | 7^{10}
WC | (Italy) Lorenzo Musetti | 4 | 6^{8}

=== Third qualifier ===
First round
3 | (Canada) Brayden Schnur | 2 | 6 | 6
(Austria) Sebastian Ofner | 6 | 3 | 4
(Italy) Federico Gaio | 6^{4} | 0
(Belgium) Kimmer Coppejans | 7^{7} | 6
(United States) Thai-Son Kwiatkowski | 3 | 6^{8}
(United States) Christopher Eubanks | 6 | 7^{10}
(Serbia) Viktor Troicki | 6 | 6
22 | (United States) Bradley Klahn | 4 | 2

Second round
3 | (Canada) Brayden Schnur | 6^{3} | 3
(Belgium) Kimmer Coppejans | 7^{7} | 6
(United States) Christopher Eubanks | 4 | 2
(Serbia) Viktor Troicki | 6 | 1^{r}

Qualifying competition
(Belgium) Kimmer Coppejans | 4 | 6^{3}
(United States) Christopher Eubanks | 6 | 7^{7}

=== Fourth qualifier ===
First round
4 | (Finland) Emil Ruusuvuori | 7 | 6
(Argentina) Facundo Mena | 5 | 2
(Belgium) Steve Darcis | 5 | 5
(France) Elliot Benchetrit | 7 | 7
(France) Enzo Couacaud | 4 | 7^{7} | 6
(Serbia) Danilo Petrović | 6 | 6^{5} | 2
(Kazakhstan) Dmitry Popko | 7^{9} | 7^{7}
25 | (China) Zhang Zhizhen | 6^{7} | 6^{5}

Second round
4 | (Finland) Emil Ruusuvuori | 4 | 6 | 6^{3}
(France) Elliot Benchetrit | 6 | 0 | 7^{10}
(France) Enzo Couacaud | 3 | 6 | 3
(Kazakhstan) Dmitry Popko | 6 | 3 | 6

Qualifying competition
(France) Elliot Benchetrit | 4 | 6 | 6
(Kazakhstan) Dmitry Popko | 6 | 2 | 3

=== Fifth qualifier ===
First round
5 | (Slovakia) Andrej Martin | 6 | 6
(Russia) Alexey Vatutin | 3 | 2
(France) Mathias Bourgue | 5 | 6 | 6
(Germany) Oscar Otte | 7 | 1 | 1
(Spain) Mario Vilella Martínez | 6 | 6
(France) Nicolas Mahut | 3 | 4
(Italy) Stefano Napolitano | 3 | 4
24 | (Argentina) Facundo Bagnis | 6 | 6

Second round
5 | (Slovakia) Andrej Martin | 6 | 6^{5} | 5
(France) Mathias Bourgue | 4 | 7^{7} | 7
(Spain) Mario Vilella Martínez | 7^{8} | 0 | 6
24 | (Argentina) Facundo Bagnis | 6^{6} | 6 | 4

Qualifying competition
(France) Mathias Bourgue | 1 | 4
(Spain) Mario Vilella Martínez | 6 | 6

=== Sixth qualifier ===
First round
6 | (Russia) Evgeny Donskoy | 6^{3} | 6 | 7^{10}
(Brazil) João Menezes | 7^{7} | 1 | 6^{8}
(Ecuador) Emilio Gómez | 6^{5} | 6 | 3
Alt | (Croatia) Viktor Galović | 7^{7} | 2 | 6
(Canada) Peter Polansky | 1 | 2
(France) Alexandre Müller | 6 | 6
(Egypt) Mohamed Safwat | 7^{7} | 6
21 | (India) Sumit Nagal | 6^{2} | 2

Second round
6 | (Russia) Evgeny Donskoy | 6 | 3 | 6
Alt | (Croatia) Viktor Galović | 3 | 6 | 3
(France) Alexandre Müller | 5 | 5
(Egypt) Mohamed Safwat | 7 | 7

Qualifying competition
6 | (Russia) Evgeny Donskoy | 5 | 4
(Egypt) Mohamed Safwat | 7 | 6

=== Seventh qualifier ===
First round
7 | (United States) Denis Kudla | 7^{7} | 6
(Australia) Bernard Tomic | 6^{4} | 3
(United Kingdom) Liam Broady | 3 | 0
(Belarus) Ilya Ivashka | 6 | 6
(Germany) Mats Moraing | 6^{5} | 3
(Portugal) João Domingues | 7^{7} | 6
(China) Li Zhe | 7^{7} | 5
28 | (Israel) Dudi Sela | 6^{2} | 3^{r}

Second round
7 | (United States) Denis Kudla | 6^{5} | 7 | 5
(Belarus) Ilya Ivashka | 7^{7} | 5 | 7
(Portugal) João Domingues | 4 | 1
(China) Li Zhe | 6 | 6

Qualifying competition
(Belarus) Ilya Ivashka | 6 | 6
(China) Li Zhe | 4 | 3

=== Eighth qualifier ===
First round
8 | (Japan) Taro Daniel | 5 | 4
(Serbia) Nikola Milojević | 7 | 6
(United States) Ernesto Escobedo | 2 | 7^{10} | 7^{10}
(United States) Mitchell Krueger | 6 | 6^{8} | 6^{7}
(France) Quentin Halys | 6 | 7^{7}
WC | (Australia) Akira Santillan | 3 | 6^{4}
(South Korea) Lee Duck-hee | 2 | 7 | 7^{10}
32 | (Italy) Alessandro Giannessi | 6 | 5 | 6^{7}

Second round
(Serbia) Nikola Milojević | 6 | 7^{7}
(United States) Ernesto Escobedo | 4 | 6^{4}
(France) Quentin Halys | 6 | 6
(South Korea) Lee Duck-hee | 3 | 4

Qualifying competition
(Serbia) Nikola Milojević | 3 | 6^{2}
(France) Quentin Halys | 6 | 7^{7}

=== Ninth qualifier ===
First round
9 | (Japan) Go Soeda | 4 | 4
(Argentina) Marco Trungelliti | 6 | 6
(Czech Republic) Zdeněk Kolář | 4 | 2
(United States) J. J. Wolf | 6 | 6
(Italy) Lorenzo Giustino | 6 | 7
(China) Bai Yan | 3 | 5
PR | (Germany) Maximilian Marterer | 7^{7} | 6^{2} | 6^{8}
18 | (Germany) Yannick Maden | 6^{2} | 7^{7} | 7^{10}

Second round
(Argentina) Marco Trungelliti | 0 | 7^{7} | 7
(United States) J. J. Wolf | 6 | 6^{5} | 5
(Italy) Lorenzo Giustino | 6^{4} | 6 | 6
18 | (Germany) Yannick Maden | 7^{7} | 2 | 4

Qualifying competition
(Argentina) Marco Trungelliti | 6 | 1 | 7^{10}
(Italy) Lorenzo Giustino | 2 | 6 | 6^{4}

=== Tenth qualifier ===
First round
10 | (Slovakia) Norbert Gombos | 6 | 6
(Argentina) Juan Pablo Ficovich | 4 | 1
(Italy) Roberto Marcora | 6 | 6
(Slovakia) Lukáš Lacko | 3 | 2
(Portugal) Frederico Ferreira Silva | 2 | 6 | 6
Alt | (South Korea) Nam Ji-sung | 6 | 4 | 4
(Serbia) Peđa Krstin | 6 | 6
30 | (Slovakia) Martin Kližan | 3 | 2

Second round
10 | (Slovakia) Norbert Gombos | 6 | 6
(Italy) Roberto Marcora | 2 | 4
(Portugal) Frederico Ferreira Silva | 6 | 4 | 1
(Serbia) Peđa Krstin | 3 | 6 | 6

Qualifying competition
10 | (Slovakia) Norbert Gombos | 6 | 6
(Serbia) Peđa Krstin | 3 | 3

=== Eleventh qualifier ===
First round
11 | (Italy) Thomas Fabbiano | 6^{2} | 4
WC | (Australia) Aleksandar Vukic | 7^{7} | 6
(Germany) Matthias Bachinger | 7 | 7
WC | (Australia) Jason Kubler | 5 | 5
(Colombia) Daniel Elahi Galán | 6 | 6
(Italy) Filippo Baldi | 1 | 2
(United States) Donald Young | 4 | 7^{10} | 1
19 | (Chinese Taipei) Jason Jung | 6 | 6^{8} | 6

Second round
WC | (Australia) Aleksandar Vukic | 6 | 6
(Germany) Matthias Bachinger | 4 | 3
(Colombia) Daniel Elahi Galán | 6 | 3 | 6
19 | (Chinese Taipei) Jason Jung | 3 | 6 | 3

Qualifying competition
WC | (Australia) Aleksandar Vukic | 3 | 2
(Colombia) Daniel Elahi Galán | 6 | 6

=== Twelfth qualifier ===
First round
12 | (Italy) Paolo Lorenzi | 6 | 6
(Spain) Adrián Menéndez Maceiras | 3 | 3
(Czech Republic) Lukáš Rosol | 6 | 6
(France) Tristan Lamasine | 4 | 3
(Spain) Pedro Martínez | 6 | 6
(Germany) Julian Lenz | 0 | 1
WC | (Australia) Tristan Schoolkate | 6 | 5 | 5
29 | (Peru) Juan Pablo Varillas | 2 | 7 | 7

Second round
12 | (Italy) Paolo Lorenzi | 7^{7} | 6^{9} | 5
(Czech Republic) Lukáš Rosol | 6^{4} | 7^{11} | 7
(Spain) Pedro Martínez | 6 | 6
29 | (Peru) Juan Pablo Varillas | 3 | 3

Qualifying competition
(Czech Republic) Lukáš Rosol | 4 | 2
(Spain) Pedro Martínez | 6 | 6

=== Thirteenth qualifier ===
First round
13 | (Italy) Gianluca Mager | 7 | 6
(Australia) Matthew Ebden | 5 | 4
(Australia) Max Purcell | 7^{7} | 6^{4} | 6
(Argentina) Andrea Collarini | 6^{2} | 7^{7} | 4
WC | (Australia) Luke Saville | 6 | 6
(Denmark) Mikael Torpegaard | 3 | 3
(Germany) Tobias Kamke | 1 | 6^{4}
26 | (Slovakia) Jozef Kovalík | 6 | 7^{7}

Second round
13 | (Italy) Gianluca Mager | 3 | 6 | 4
(Australia) Max Purcell | 6 | 4 | 6
WC | (Australia) Luke Saville | 7^{9} | 6^{3} | 4
26 | (Slovakia) Jozef Kovalík | 6^{7} | 7^{7} | 6

Qualifying competition
(Australia) Max Purcell | 6 | 6
26 | (Slovakia) Jozef Kovalík | 4 | 2

=== Fourteenth qualifier ===
First round
14 | (France) Antoine Hoang | 6^{4} | 7^{7} | 1
(France) Maxime Janvier | 7^{7} | 6^{5} | 6
(Italy) Matteo Viola | 4 | 6 | 3
(Spain) Nicola Kuhn | 6 | 3 | 1^{r}
(Spain) Bernabé Zapata Miralles | 6^{5} | 6 | 3
(Chile) Alejandro Tabilo | 7^{7} | 2 | 6
(Ukraine) Sergiy Stakhovsky | 7^{7} | 6
31 | (Slovenia) Blaž Rola | 6^{3} | 4

Second round
(France) Maxime Janvier | 6^{6} | 4
(Italy) Matteo Viola | 7^{8} | 6
(Chile) Alejandro Tabilo | 2 | 6 | 6
(Ukraine) Sergiy Stakhovsky | 6 | 2 | 3

Qualifying competition
(Italy) Matteo Viola | 2 | 3
(Chile) Alejandro Tabilo | 6 | 6

=== Fifteenth qualifier ===
First round
15 | (Argentina) Federico Coria | 4 | 6 | 6
(India) Ramkumar Ramanathan | 6 | 4 | 1
(Latvia) Ernests Gulbis | 6 | 6
(United States) Maxime Cressy | 3 | 3
(Spain) Carlos Taberner | 6^{8} | 1
(Germany) Yannick Hanfmann | 7^{10} | 6
WC | (Australia) Harry Bourchier | 2 | 4
17 | (India) Prajnesh Gunneswaran | 6 | 6

Second round
15 | (Argentina) Federico Coria | 3 | 6 | 2
(Latvia) Ernests Gulbis | 6 | 1 | 6
(Germany) Yannick Hanfmann | 6 | 2 | 1
17 | (India) Prajnesh Gunneswaran | 1 | 6 | 6

Qualifying competition
(Latvia) Ernests Gulbis | 7^{7} | 6
17 | (India) Prajnesh Gunneswaran | 6^{2} | 2

=== Sixteenth qualifier ===
First round
16 | (Germany) Peter Gojowczyk | 6 | 6
(Brazil) Thiago Seyboth Wild | 4 | 2
PR | (Slovenia) Blaž Kavčič | 7^{7} | 3 | 6
(United Kingdom) Jay Clarke | 6^{2} | 6 | 2
(Netherlands) Botic van de Zandschulp | 3 | 6 | 5
(France) Constant Lestienne | 6 | 1 | 7
WC | (Australia) Blake Mott | 6 | 6
27 | (Portugal) Pedro Sousa | 3 | 4

Second round
16 | (Germany) Peter Gojowczyk | 3 | 6 | 6
PR | (Slovenia) Blaž Kavčič | 6 | 3 | 4
(France) Constant Lestienne | 6 | 6
WC | (Australia) Blake Mott | 4 | 4

Qualifying competition
16 | (Germany) Peter Gojowczyk | 6 | 6
(France) Constant Lestienne | 2 | 3
