= Shavit Kimchi =

Israeli tennis player (born 2002)

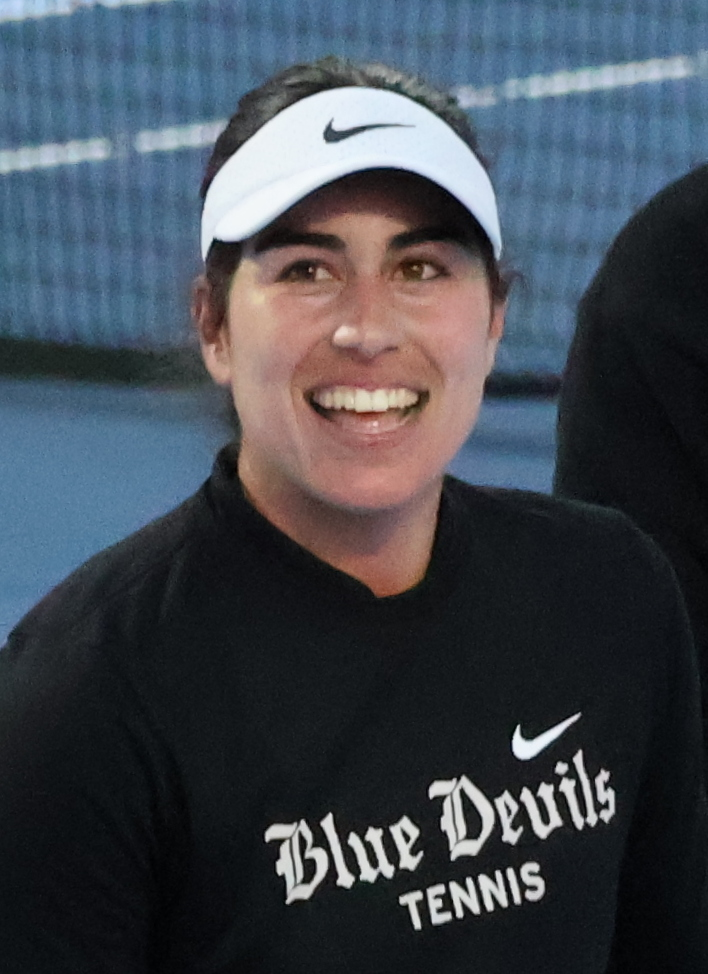
- Kimchi with Duke in 2025
- Native name: שביט קמחי
- Country (sports): Israel
- Born: 12 January 2002 (age 24) Israel
- Plays: Right-handed (double-handed backhand)
- Prize money: US$31,619

Singles
- Career record: 85–65
- Career titles: 1 ITF
- Highest ranking: No. 415 (25 July 2022)

Grand Slam singles results
- Australian Open Junior: 1R (2020)
- French Open Junior: 1R (2019)
- Wimbledon Junior: 1R (2019)

Doubles
- Career record: 57–37
- Career titles: 4 ITF
- Highest ranking: No. 316 (12 September 2022)

Grand Slam doubles results
- Australian Open Junior: QF (2020)
- French Open Junior: 2R (2019)
- Wimbledon Junior: 2R (2019)

Team competitions
- Fed Cup: 2–1
- Last updated on: 25 May 2024.

Shavit Kimchi (Hebrew: שביט קמחי; born 12 January 2002) is an Israeli tennis player.

Kimchi has a career-high WTA singles ranking of 415, achieved on 25 July 2022. She also has a career-high WTA doubles ranking of 325, achieved on 25 July 2022. Kimchi has won 1 ITF singles and 4 doubles titles.

Kimchi represents Israel in the Fed Cup.

== ITF Circuit finals ==
=== Singles: 1 (1 title) ===
Legend $15,000 tournaments	Finals by surface Hard (1–0)

Result	W-L	Date	Tournament	Tier	Surface	Opponents	Score
Win	1–0	May 2021	ITF Jerusalem, Israel	15,000	Hard	(Russia) Ekaterina Yashina	6–4, 6–3

=== Doubles: 11 (5 titles, 6 runner–ups) ===
Legend $25,000 tournaments $15,000 tournaments	Finals by surface Hard (4–3) Clay (1–3)

Result	W-L	Date	Tournament	Tier	Surface	Partner	Opponents	Score
Loss	0–1	May 2018	ITF Tiberias, Israel	15,000	Hard	(Israel) Maya Tahan	(India) Riya Bhatia (United States) Madeleine Kobelt	3–6, 2–6
Win	1–1	Sep 2019	ITF Kiryat Shmona, Israel	25,000	Hard	(Israel) Maya Tahan	(France) Victoria Muntean (Germany) Natalia Siedliska	4–6, 6–4, [12–10]
Win	2–1	Nov 2019	ITF Cancún, Mexico	15,000	Hard	(Hungary) Adrienn Nagy	(France) Tiphanie Fiquet (Croatia) Tea Jandrić	6–3, 6–2
Loss	2–2	Nov 2020	ITF Heraklion, Greece	15,000	Clay	(Israel) Maya Tahan	(Italy) Verena Meliss (Italy) Martina Spigarelli	5–7, 2–6
Win	3–2	Apr 2021	ITF Antalya, Turkey	15,000	Clay	(Hungary) Adrienn Nagy	(Japan) Misaki Matsuda (South Korea) Lee So-ra	5–7, 6–2, [10–8]
Loss	3–3	May 2021	ITF Ramat HaSharon, Israel	15,000	Hard	(Israel) Lina Glushko	(Switzerland) Jenny Dürst (Switzerland) Nina Stadler	6–1, 4–6, [6–10]
Loss	3–4	Jun 2021	ITF Heraklion, Greece	15,000	Clay	(Israel) Nicole Khirin	(United States) Jessie Aney (Czech Republic) Michaela Bayerlová	4–6, 4–6
Win	4–4	Oct 2021	ITF Netanya, Israel	25,000	Hard	(Israel) Lina Glushko	(Czech Republic) Linda Nosková (Sweden) Fanny Östlund	6–4, 6–2
Win	5–4	May 2022	ITF Akko, Israel	25,000	Hard	(Israel) Nicole Khirin	(Japan) Haruna Arakawa (Japan) Natsuho Arakawa	5–7, 7–5, [10-8]
Loss	5–5	Feb 2023	ITF Manacor, Spain	15,000	Hard	(Israel) Mika Dagan Fruchtman	(Denmark) Rebecca Munk Mortensen (Portugal) Inês Murta	0–6, 3–6
Loss	5–6	Mar 2023	ITF Heraklion, Greece	15,000	Clay	(Slovakia) Nina Vargová	(Lithuania) Patricija Paukštytė (Romania) Anca Todoni	3–6, 7–6^{(7)}, [5–10]
