= 2011 Australian Open – Wheelchair men's doubles =

Wheelchair men's doubles
- 2011 Australian Open

Final
- Champion: (Japan) Shingo Kunieda (Netherlands) Maikel Scheffers
- Runner-up: (France) Stéphane Houdet (France) Nicolas Peifer
- Score: 6–3, 6–3

Events
Singles	men	women		boys	girls
Doubles	men	women	mixed	boys	girls
WC Singles	men	women	quad
WC Doubles	men	women	quad
Legends	men	women	mixed
← 2010 ·	Australian Open	· 2012 →

Four-time defending champion Shingo Kunieda and his partner Maikel Scheffers defeated the other defending champion Stéphane Houdet and his partner Nicolas Peifer in the final, 6–3, 6–3 to win the men's doubles wheelchair tennis title at the 2011 Australian Open.

== Seeds ==
1. (Netherlands) Maikel Scheffers / (Japan) Shingo Kunieda (champions)
2. (France) Stéphane Houdet / (France) Nicolas Peifer (final)

== Draw ==
=== Key ===
- Q = Qualifier
- WC = Wild card
- LL = Lucky loser
- Alt = Alternate
- ITF = ITF entry
- PR = Protected ranking
- SR = Special ranking
- SE = Special exempt
- JE = Junior exempt
- JR = Junior Accelerator Programme entrant
- CO = College Accelerator Programme entrant
- NG = Next Gen Accelerator Program entrant
- w/o = Walkover
- r = Retired
- d = Defaulted

=== Finals ===
Semifinals
1	(Japan) Shingo Kunieda (Netherlands) Maikel Scheffers	6	7^{7}
(Netherlands) Robin Ammerlaan (Sweden) Stefan Olsson	3	6^{2}
(Netherlands) Ronald Vink (Australia) Ben Weekes	2	6^{5}
2	(France) Stéphane Houdet (France) Nicolas Peifer	6	7^{7}

Final
1	(Japan) Shingo Kunieda (Netherlands) Maikel Scheffers	6	6
2	(France) Stéphane Houdet (France) Nicolas Peifer	3	3
