= 2020 Australian Open – Boys' singles =

Boys' singles
- 2020 Australian Open

Final
- Champion: (France) Harold Mayot
- Runner-up: (France) Arthur Cazaux
- Score: 6–4, 6–1

Events
Singles	men	women		boys	girls
Doubles	men	women	mixed	boys	girls
WC Singles	men	women	quad
WC Doubles	men	women	quad
Legends	men	women	mixed
- Australian Open

Harold Mayot won the boys' singles tennis title at the 2020 Australian Open, defeating Arthur Cazaux in the final, 6–4, 6–1.

Lorenzo Musetti was the defending champion, but chose not to participate. He received a wildcard into the men's singles qualifying competition, where he lost to Tallon Griekspoor in the third round.

== Seeds ==
1. (France) Harold Mayot (champion)
2. (United States) Martin Damm (quarterfinals)
3. (Japan) Shunsuke Mitsui (second round)
4. (Switzerland) Jeffrey von der Schulenburg (first round)
5. (France) Arthur Cazaux (final)
6. (Switzerland) Leandro Riedi (third round)
7. (Switzerland) Dominic Stricker (quarterfinals)
8. (South Africa) Khololwam Montsi (second round)

9. (Italy) Flavio Cobolli (second round)
10. (Czech Republic) Dalibor Svrčina (third round)
11. (Ivory Coast) Eliakim Coulibaly (first round)
12. (Latvia) Kārlis Ozoliņš (semifinals)
13. (Romania) Nicholas David Ionel (first round)
14. (China) Li Hanwen (second round)
15. (China) Bu Yunchaokete (first round)
16. (France) Térence Atmane (second round)

Click on the seed number of a player to go to their draw section.

== Draw ==
Key

- Q = Qualifier
- WC = Wild card
- LL = Lucky loser
- Alt = Alternate
- ITF = ITF entry
- PR = Protected ranking
- SR = Special ranking
- SE = Special exempt
- JE = Junior exempt
- JR = Junior Accelerator Programme entrant
- CO = College Accelerator Programme entrant
- NG = Next Gen Accelerator Program entrant
- w/o = Walkover
- r = Retired
- d = Defaulted

=== Finals ===
Quarterfinals
1	(France) Harold Mayot	4	6	7
7	(Switzerland) Dominic Stricker	6	2	5
(France) Giovanni Mpetshi Perricard	6	3	4
(France) Timo Legout	3	6	6
12	(Latvia) Kārlis Ozoliņš	3	7^{8}	6
(Russia) Egor Agafonov	6	6^{6}	3
5	(France) Arthur Cazaux	3	6	7^{10}
2	(United States) Martin Damm	6	3	6^{4}

Semifinals
1	(France) Harold Mayot	3	6	6
(France) Timo Legout	6	3	2
12	(Latvia) Kārlis Ozoliņš	6	1	2
5	(France) Arthur Cazaux	4	6	6

Final
1	(France) Harold Mayot	6	6
5	(France) Arthur Cazaux	4	1

=== Top half ===
==== Section 1 ====
First round
1	(France) Harold Mayot	6	7
Q	(Germany) Benito Sanchez Martinez	2	5
(United States) Aidan Mayo	3	7^{7}	6
Q	(Ukraine) Viacheslav Bielinskyi	6	6^{3}	1
Q	(New Zealand) Corban Crowther	6	6
WC	(Australia) Alex Bulte	3	4
Q	(United States) Alexander Bernard	6	5	6
13	(Romania) Nicholas David Ionel	1	7	3
11	(Ivory Coast) Eliakim Coulibaly	6^{3}	6	5
Q	(China) Zhang Yu	7^{7}	1	7
(Italy) Samuel Vincent Ruggeri	4	6	3
(Germany) Max Wiskandt	6	4	6
(Russia) Marat Sharipov	7^{7}	3	2
WC	(Hong Kong) Coleman Wong	6^{3}	6	6
(Brazil) Gustavo Heide	5	1
7	(Switzerland) Dominic Stricker	7	6

Second round
1	(France) H Mayot	6	6
(United States) A Mayo	2	3
Q	(New Zealand) C Crowther	7^{8}	4	5
Q	(United States) A Bernard	6^{6}	6	7
Q	(China) Y Zhang	6	3	6
(Germany) M Wiskandt	1	6	1
WC	(Hong Kong) C Wong	4	4
7	(Switzerland) D Stricker	6	6

Third round
1	(France) H Mayot	6	6
Q	(United States) A Bernard	3	2
Q	(China) Y Zhang	2	2
7	(Switzerland) D Stricker	6	6

Quarterfinals
1	(France) H Mayot	4	6	7
7	(Switzerland) D Stricker	6	2	5

==== Section 2 ====
First round
4	(Switzerland) Jeffrey von der Schulenburg	6	3	4
(Italy) Lorenzo Rottoli	2	6	6
(France) Giovanni Mpetshi Perricard	7	4	6
WC	(Australia) Edward Winter	5	6	3
(United Kingdom) Arthur Fery	6	6
Q	(Italy) Biagio Gramaticopolo	2	4
(United States) Dali Blanch	1	7	4
14	(China) Li Hanwen	6	5	6
10	(Czech Republic) Dalibor Svrčina	6	6
WC	(Australia) Tai Sach	4	2
SE	(Italy) Matteo Gigante	6	6
(Russia) Evgeny Philippov	3	4
Q	(Italy) Fausto Tabacco	1	2^{r}
(France) Timo Legout	6	5
Q	(United States) Cash Hanzlik	4	1
8	(South Africa) Khololwam Montsi	6	6

Second round
(Italy) L Rottoli	4	2
(France) G Mpetshi Perricard	6	6
(United Kingdom) A Fery	6	4	7
14	(China) H Li	3	6	5
10	(Czech Republic) D Svrčina	3	6	6
SE	(Italy) M Gigante	6	1	2
(France) T Legout	7^{7}	6
8	(South Africa) K Montsi	6^{5}	1

Third round
(France) G Mpetshi Perricard	6	7^{9}
(United Kingdom) A Fery	3	6^{7}
10	(Czech Republic) D Svrčina	5	3
(France) T Legout	7	6

Quarterfinals
(France) G Mpetshi Perricard	6	3	4
(France) T Legout	3	6	6

=== Bottom half ===
==== Section 3 ====
First round
6	(Switzerland) Leandro Riedi	7	6
(Netherlands) Stijn Pel	5	3
WC	(Australia) Derek Pham	3	3
(Belgium) Alexander Hoogmartens	6	6
(Italy) Luca Nardi	6	6
(India) Dev Javia	3	3
(France) Max Westphal	1	4
12	(Latvia) Kārlis Ozoliņš	6	6
16	(France) Térence Atmane	6	7
WC	(Australia) Philip Sekulic	2	5
(United Kingdom) Felix Gill	2	6^{2}
(Russia) Egor Agafonov	6	7^{7}
(Italy) Francesco Maestrelli	6^{4}	2
(Czech Republic) Martin Krumich	7^{7}	6
WC	(China) Wang Xiaofei	6^{5}	4
3	(Japan) Shunsuke Mitsui	7^{7}	6

Second round
6	(Switzerland) L Riedi	6	6
(Belgium) A Hoogmartens	3	2
(Italy) L Nardi	3	4
12	(Latvia) K Ozoliņš	6	6
16	(France) T Atmane	5	3
(Russia) E Agafonov	7	6
(Czech Republic) M Krumich	6	6
3	(Japan) S Mitsui	3	2

Third round
6	(Switzerland) L Riedi	3	6^{5}
12	(Latvia) K Ozoliņš	6	7^{7}
(Russia) E Agafonov	6	3	7^{10}
(Czech Republic) M Krumich	3	6	6^{3}

Quarterfinals
12	(Latvia) K Ozoliņš	3	7^{8}	6
(Russia) E Agafonov	6	6^{6}	3

==== Section 4 ====
First round
5	(France) Arthur Cazaux	2	7^{7}	6
(Poland) Mikołaj Lorens	6	6^{3}	2
(Thailand) Patorn Hanchaikul	1	4
(Austria) Lukas Neumayer	6	6
(Hungary) Péter Fajta	6	6
(Romania) Sebastian Gima	3	3
(Australia) Chen Dong	7	2	2
9	(Italy) Flavio Cobolli	5	6	6
15	(China) Bu Yunchaokete	1	6	3
(France) Lilian Marmousez	6	2	6
WC	(Australia) James McCabe	6	6
(Switzerland) Jérôme Kym	4	4
(Serbia) Hamad Međedović	6	6
(Russia) Nikita Kashirin	3	4
(Venezuela) Lorenzo Claverie	4	1
2	(United States) Martin Damm	6	6

Second round
5	(France) A Cazaux	6	6
(Austria) L Neumayer	4	1
(Hungary) P Fajta	6	6
9	(Italy) F Cobolli	3	2
(France) L Marmousez	6^{4}	6	6
WC	(Australia) J McCabe	7^{7}	2	0
(Serbia) H Međedović	7^{7}	4	4
2	(United States) M Damm	6^{3}	6	6

Third round
5	(France) A Cazaux	7	3	7^{10}
(Hungary) P Fajta	5	6	6^{5}
(France) L Marmousez	3	2
2	(United States) M Damm	6	6

Quarterfinals
5	(France) A Cazaux	3	6	7^{10}
2	(United States) M Damm	6	3	6^{4}

== Qualifying ==
=== Seeds ===
1. (United States) Alexander Bernard (qualified)
2. (Italy) Biagio Gramaticopolo (qualified)
3. (Kazakhstan) Rostislav Galfinger (qualifying competition)
4. (Italy) Fausto Tabacco (qualified)
5. (China) Zhang Yu (qualified)
6. (Ukraine) Viacheslav Bielinskyi (qualified)
7. (Germany) Benito Sanchez Martinez (qualified)
8. (United States) Cash Hanzlik (qualified)
9. (China) Huang Haoyuan (qualifying competition)
10. (Slovakia) Lukáš Palovič (qualifying competition)
11. (Austria) Marko Andrejic (first round)
12. (Philippines) Michael Francis Eala (qualifying competition)
13. (Republic of Ireland) Ammar Elamin (qualifying competition)
14. (Uruguay) Francisco Llanes (qualifying competition)
15. (New Zealand) Reece Falck (qualifying competition)
16. (Australia) Casey Hoole (qualifying competition)

=== Qualifiers ===
1. (United States) Alexander Bernard
2. (Italy) Biagio Gramaticopolo
3. (New Zealand) Corban Crowther
4. (Italy) Fausto Tabacco
5. (China) Zhang Yu
6. (Ukraine) Viacheslav Bielinskyi
7. (Germany) Benito Sanchez Martinez
8. (United States) Cash Hanzlik

=== Draw ===
==== First qualifier ====
First round
1	(United States) Alexander Bernard	6	6^{2}	7^{10}
(Australia) Callum Gale	1	7^{7}	6^{8}
WC	(Australia) David Qariaqus	2	1
12	(Philippines) Michael Francis Eala	6	6

Qualifying competition
1	(United States) Alexander Bernard	6	6
12	(Philippines) Michael Francis Eala	4	4

==== Second qualifier ====
First round
2	(Italy) Biagio Gramaticopolo	6	5	7
(Australia) Jiayang Dong	2	7	5
(Australia) Jack McCarthy	6	2	1
10	(Slovakia) Lukáš Palovič	4	6	6

Qualifying competition
2	(Italy) Biagio Gramaticopolo	6	6
10	(Slovakia) Lukáš Palovič	3	1

==== Third qualifier ====
First round
3	(Kazakhstan) Rostislav Galfinger	6	2	6
(Australia) Jeremy Jin	1	6	2
(New Zealand) Corban Crowther	6	6
11	(Austria) Marko Andrejic	4	4

Qualifying competition
3	(Kazakhstan) Rostislav Galfinger	1	4
(New Zealand) Corban Crowther	6	6

==== Fourth qualifier ====
First round
4	(Italy) Fausto Tabacco	6	6
WC	(Australia) Daniel Paveska	1	1
(Australia) Junyi Tang	3	5
9	(China) Huang Haoyuan	6	7

Qualifying competition
4	(Italy) Fausto Tabacco	6	6
9	(China) Huang Haoyuan	4	2

==== Fifth qualifier ====
First round
5	(China) Zhang Yu	6	6
WC	(Australia) Matthew Harper	4	4
(Australia) Cooper White	6	3	1
15/WC	(New Zealand) Reece Falck	4	6	6

Qualifying competition
5	(China) Zhang Yu	7^{10}	6
15/WC	(New Zealand) Reece Falck	6^{8}	2

==== Sixth qualifier ====
First round
6	(Ukraine) Viacheslav Bielinskyi	6	6
(United States) Adit Sinha	1	3
(Australia) Shuannon Tricerri	6^{1}	7	2
14	(Uruguay) Francisco Llanes	7^{7}	5	6

Qualifying competition
6	(Ukraine) Viacheslav Bielinskyi	6	6
14	(Uruguay) Francisco Llanes	1	1

==== Seventh qualifier ====
First round
7	(Germany) Benito Sanchez Martinez	6	6
(Australia) Edward Vo	3	1
(Japan) Daisuke Inagawa	6	0	6^{5}
16	(Australia) Casey Hoole	2	6	7^{10}

Qualifying competition
7	(Germany) Benito Sanchez Martinez	6	7^{8}
16	(Australia) Casey Hoole	3	6^{6}

==== Eighth qualifier ====
First round
8	(United States) Cash Hanzlik	6	6
(Australia) Matthew Bosancic	2	2
(Netherlands) Frank Jonker	1	4
13	(Republic of Ireland) Ammar Elamin	6	6

Qualifying competition
8	(United States) Cash Hanzlik	6	6
13	(Republic of Ireland) Ammar Elamin	4	0
