= 2020 Australian Open – Men's legends' doubles =

Men's legends' doubles
- 2020 Australian Open
- 2019 Champions: (France) Mansour Bahrami (Australia) Mark Philippoussis

Events
| Singles | men | women | | boys | girls |
| Doubles | men | women | mixed | boys | girls |
| WC Singles | men | women | quad |
| WC Doubles | men | women | quad |
| Legends | men | women | mixed |
| ← 2019 · | Australian Open | · 2021 → |

Mansour Bahrami and Mark Philippoussis were the defending champions, but chose not to participate together. Bahrami plays alongside Fabrice Santoro, whereas Philippoussis plays alongside Tommy Haas.

== Draw ==
=== Key ===
- Q = Qualifier
- WC = Wild card
- LL = Lucky loser
- Alt = Alternate
- ITF = ITF entry
- PR = Protected ranking
- SR = Special ranking
- SE = Special exempt
- JE = Junior exempt
- JR = Junior Accelerator Programme entrant
- CO = College Accelerator Programme entrant
- NG = Next Gen Accelerator Program entrant
- w/o = Walkover
- r = Retired
- d = Defaulted

=== Final ===
| Final |

=== Group stage ===
| | | (United States) McEnroe (United States) McEnroe | (Germany) Haas (Australia) Philippoussis | (Sweden) Björkman (Sweden) Johansson | (France) Leconte (Australia) Woodbridge | (France) Bahrami (France) Santoro | (Australia) Cash (Australia) Woodforde | (South Africa) Ferreira (Croatia) Ivanišević | (Sweden) Björkman (Sweden) Wilander (Austria) Muster | RR; W–L | Set; W–L | Game; W–L | Standings |
| 1 | (United States) John McEnroe (United States) Patrick McEnroe | | | | | 3–4^{(3–5)}, 4–1, 4–1 | | | 4–2, 4–1 | 2–0 | 4–1 | 19–9 | |
| 2 | (Germany) Tommy Haas (Australia) Mark Philippoussis | | | 4–3^{(5–1)}, 4–3^{(5–3)} | 3–4^{(3–5)}, 4–1, 4–1 | | | | 4–0, 1–4, 4–3^{(5–2)} | 3–0 | 6–2 | 28–19 | |
| 3 | (Sweden) Jonas Björkman (Sweden) Thomas Johansson | | 3–4^{(1–5)}, 3–4^{(3–5)} | | | | | 1–4, 4–2, 4–3^{(5–2)} | | 1–1 | 2–3 | 15–17 | |
| 4 | (France) Henri Leconte (Australia) Todd Woodbridge | | 4–3^{(5–3)}, 1–4, 1–4 | | | | | 3–4^{(1–5)}, 4–1, 4–2 | | 1–1 | 3–3 | 17–18 | |
| 5 | (France) Mansour Bahrami (France) Fabrice Santoro | 4–3^{(5–3)}, 1–4, 1–4 | | | | | 4–3^{(5–2)}, 4–2 | 4–2, 3–4^{(2–5)}, 4–2 | | 2–1 | 5–3 | 25–24 | |
| 6 | (Australia) Pat Cash (Australia) Mark Woodforde | | | | | 3–4^{(2–5)}, 2–4 | | | 4–1, 3–4^{(4–5)}, 4–3^{(5–1)} | 1–1 | 2–3 | 16–16 | |
| 7 | (South Africa) Wayne Ferreira (Croatia) Goran Ivanišević | | | 4–1, 2–4, 3–4^{(2–5)} | 4–3^{(5–1)}, 1–4, 2–4 | 2–4, 4–3^{(5–2)}, 2–4 | | | | 0–3 | 3–6 | 24–31 | |
| 8 | (Sweden) Jonas Björkman (Sweden) Mats Wilander (Austria) Thomas Muster | 2–4, 1–4(w/ Muster) | 0–4, 4–1, 3–4^{(2–5)}(w/ Björkman) | | | | 1–4, 4–3^{(5–4)}, 3–4^{(1–5)}(w/ Muster) | | | 0–3 | 2–6 | 18–28 | |
