= 2020 Australian Open – Wheelchair men's doubles =

Wheelchair men's doubles
- 2020 Australian Open

Final
- Champion: (United Kingdom) Alfie Hewett (United Kingdom) Gordon Reid
- Runner-up: (France) Stéphane Houdet (France) Nicolas Peifer
- Score: 4–6, 6–4, [10–7]

Events
Singles	men	women		boys	girls
Doubles	men	women	mixed	boys	girls
WC Singles	men	women	quad
WC Doubles	men	women	quad
Legends	men	women	mixed
← 2019 ·	Australian Open	· 2021 →

Alfie Hewett and Gordon Reid defeated Stéphane Houdet and Nicolas Peifer in the final, 4–6, 6–4, [10–7] to win the men's doubles wheelchair tennis title at the 2020 Australian Open.

Joachim Gérard and Stefan Olsson were the reigning champions, but Olsson did not participate. Gérard partnered Ben Weekes, but was defeated by Houdet and Peifer in the semifinals.

== Seeds ==
1. (France) Stéphane Houdet / (France) Nicolas Peifer (final)
2. (United Kingdom) Alfie Hewett / (United Kingdom) Gordon Reid (champions)

== Draw ==
=== Key ===
- Q = Qualifier
- WC = Wild card
- LL = Lucky loser
- Alt = Alternate
- ITF = ITF entry
- PR = Protected ranking
- SR = Special ranking
- SE = Special exempt
- JE = Junior exempt
- JR = Junior Accelerator Programme entrant
- CO = College Accelerator Programme entrant
- NG = Next Gen Accelerator Program entrant
- w/o = Walkover
- r = Retired
- d = Defaulted

=== Bracket ===
Semifinals
1	(France) Stéphane Houdet (France) Nicolas Peifer	6	6
(Belgium) Joachim Gérard (Australia) Ben Weekes	3	4
(Argentina) Gustavo Fernández (Japan) Shingo Kunieda	6^{2}	6	[5]
2	(United Kingdom) Alfie Hewett (United Kingdom) Gordon Reid	7^{7}	3	[10]

Final
1	(France) Stéphane Houdet (France) Nicolas Peifer	6	4	[7]
2	(United Kingdom) Alfie Hewett (United Kingdom) Gordon Reid	4	6	[10]
