= 2020 Australian Open – Girls' singles =

Girls' singles
- 2020 Australian Open

Final
- Champion: (Andorra) Victoria Jiménez Kasintseva
- Runner-up: (Poland) Weronika Baszak
- Score: 5–7, 6–2, 6–2

Events
Singles	men	women		boys	girls
Doubles	men	women	mixed	boys	girls
WC Singles	men	women	quad
WC Doubles	men	women	quad
Legends	men	women	mixed
- Australian Open

Victoria Jiménez Kasintseva won the girls' singles title at the 2020 Australian Open, defeating Weronika Baszak in the final, 5–7, 6–2, 6–2. She became the first tennis player from Andorra to win a Grand Slam title in any discipline.

Clara Tauson was the defending champion, but chose not to participate.

== Seeds ==
1. (France) Elsa Jacquemot (second round)
2. (United States) Robin Montgomery (quarterfinals)
3. (Latvia) Kamilla Bartone (first round)
4. (Philippines) Alex Eala (third round)
5. (Czech Republic) Linda Fruhvirtová (first round)
6. (Russia) Maria Bondarenko (second round)
7. (Russia) Oksana Selekhmeteva (first round)
8. (Russia) Polina Kudermetova (quarterfinals)

9. (Andorra) Victoria Jiménez Kasintseva (champion)
10. (Canada) Mélodie Collard (second round)
11. (Thailand) Mai Napatt Nirundorn (second round)
12. (Spain) Ane Mintegi del Olmo (quarterfinals, retired)
13. (China) Bai Zhuoxuan (semifinals)
14. (France) Séléna Janicijevic (first round)
15. (Indonesia) Priska Madelyn Nugroho (third round)
16. (Hong Kong) Cody Wong Hong-yi (quarterfinals)

Click on the seed number of a player to go to their draw section.

== Draw ==
Key

- Q = Qualifier
- WC = Wild card
- LL = Lucky loser
- Alt = Alternate
- ITF = ITF entry
- PR = Protected ranking
- SR = Special ranking
- SE = Special exempt
- JE = Junior exempt
- JR = Junior Accelerator Programme entrant
- CO = College Accelerator Programme entrant
- NG = Next Gen Accelerator Program entrant
- w/o = Walkover
- r = Retired
- d = Defaulted

=== Finals ===
Quarterfinals
(Germany) Alexandra Vecic	6	1
12	(Spain) Ane Mintegi del Olmo	4	1^{r}
16	(Hong Kong) Cody Wong Hong-yi	4	2
(Poland) Weronika Baszak	6	6
8	(Russia) Polina Kudermetova	4	4
13	(China) Bai Zhuoxuan	6	6
9	(Andorra) Victoria Jiménez Kasintseva	1	7	6
2	(United States) Robin Montgomery	6	5	2

Semifinals
(Germany) Alexandra Vecic	5	6	2
(Poland) Weronika Baszak	7	2	6
13	(China) Bai Zhuoxuan	3	2
9	(Andorra) Victoria Jiménez Kasintseva	6	6

Final
(Poland) Weronika Baszak	7	2	2
9	(Andorra) Victoria Jiménez Kasintseva	5	6	6

=== Top half ===
==== Section 1 ====
First round
1	(France) Elsa Jacquemot	6	3	6
(Russia) Erika Andreeva	4	6	3
(Germany) Alexandra Vecic	7^{7}	6
(Canada) Jada Bui	6^{4}	4
(Slovenia) Živa Falkner	7^{7}	2	1^{r}
(South Korea) Back Da-yeon	6^{5}	6	4
Q	(Australia) Tina Nadine Smith	4	3
15	(Indonesia) Priska Madelyn Nugroho	6	6
12	(Spain) Ane Mintegi del Olmo	6	6
(Uruguay) Guillermina Grant	1	4
WC	(Australia) Talia Gibson	6	6
Q	(Croatia) Antonia Ružić	4	4
(Czech Republic) Darja Viďmanová	2	6	6
(Latvia) Darja Semenistaja	6	2	4
WC	(China) Tian Fangran	2	6^{2}
6	(Russia) Maria Bondarenko	6	7^{7}

Second round
1	(France) E Jacquemot	5	6	3
(Germany) A Vecic	7	4	6
(South Korea) D-y Back	5	6	5
15	(Indonesia) PM Nugroho	7	4	7
12	(Spain) A Mintegi del Olmo	6	7
WC	(Australia) T Gibson	2	5
(Czech Republic) D Viďmanová	6	5	7^{10}
6	(Russia) M Bondarenko	3	7	6^{8}

Third round
(Germany) A Vecic	6	6
15	(Indonesia) PM Nugroho	2	2
12	(Spain) A Mintegi del Olmo	6	6
(Czech Republic) D Viďmanová	4	1

Quarterfinals
(Germany) A Vecic	6	1
12	(Spain) A Mintegi del Olmo	4	1^{r}

==== Section 2 ====
First round
4/WC	(Philippines) Alex Eala	6	4	6
(Israel) Shavit Kimchi	0	6	2
WC	(Australia) Mia Repac	6	4	3
(France) Julie Belgraver	1	6	6
(United Kingdom) Amarni Banks	3	3
(Ukraine) Liubov Kostenko	6	6
(South Korea) Ku Yeon-woo	6	5	4
16	(Hong Kong) Cody Wong Hong-yi	4	7	6
11	(Thailand) Mai Napatt Nirundorn	3	6	7
(France) Giulia Morlet	6	1	5
(Hungary) Amarissa Kiara Tóth	1	4
(Russia) Elina Avanesyan	6	6
(United States) Elizabeth Coleman	6	7
WC	(Australia) Charlotte Kempenaers-Pocz	3	5
(Poland) Weronika Baszak	7^{9}	6
5	(Czech Republic) Linda Fruhvirtová	6^{7}	3

Second round
4/WC	(Philippines) A Eala	6	3	6
(France) J Belgraver	0	6	1
(Ukraine) L Kostenko	3	6	1
16	(Hong Kong) CH-y Wong	6	3	6
11	(Thailand) MN Nirundorn	2	7	1
(Russia) E Avanesyan	6	5	6
(United States) E Coleman	3	7^{7}	3
(Poland) W Baszak	6	6^{2}	6

Third round
4/WC	(Philippines) A Eala	1	3
16	(Hong Kong) CH-y Wong	6	6
(Russia) E Avanesyan	7^{7}	2	2
(Poland) W Baszak	6^{2}	6	6

Quarterfinals
16	(Hong Kong) CH-y Wong	4	2
(Poland) W Baszak	6	6

=== Bottom half ===
==== Section 3 ====
First round
8	(Russia) Polina Kudermetova	6	6
Q	(Italy) Lisa Pigato	2	4
WC	(Japan) Erika Matsuda	6	7^{7}
Q	(Australia) Amy Stevens	3	6^{4}
(United States) Savannah Broadus	6^{8}	4
(France) Aubane Droguet	7^{10}	6
(Australia) Annerly Poulos	4	0
10	(Canada) Mélodie Collard	6	6
13	(China) Bai Zhuoxuan	6	1	6
(Germany) Mara Guth	4	6	2
WC	(Australia) Taylah Preston	3	1
(Czech Republic) Linda Nosková	6	6
(France) Célia-Belle Mohr	6^{4}	3
Q	(Japan) Saki Imamura	7^{7}	6
(Russia) Diana Shnaider	7	7
3	(Latvia) Kamilla Bartone	5	5

Second round
8	(Russia) P Kudermetova	6	6
WC	(Japan) E Matsuda	1	3
(France) A Droguet	4	7^{7}	6
10	(Canada) M Collard	6	6^{5}	3
13	(China) Z Bai	6^{3}	6	7^{10}
(Czech Republic) L Nosková	7^{7}	1	6^{8}
Q	(Japan) S Imamura	1	3
(Russia) D Shnaider	6	6

Third round
8	(Russia) P Kudermetova	6	0	6
(France) A Droguet	3	6	4
13	(China) Z Bai	6	6
(Russia) D Shnaider	4	3

Quarterfinals
8	(Russia) P Kudermetova	4	4
13	(China) Z Bai	6	6

==== Section 4 ====
First round
7	(Russia) Oksana Selekhmeteva	1	4
(Germany) Angelina Wirges	6	6
Q	(Germany) Eva Lys	7	6^{5}	3
SE	(Italy) Melania Delai	5	7^{7}	6
(South Korea) Park So-hyun	6	1	5
(Czech Republic) Kristýna Lavičková	2	6	7
(United Kingdom) Matilda Mutavdzic	6	3	1
9	(Andorra) Victoria Jiménez Kasintseva	4	6	6
14	(France) Séléna Janicijevic	3	4
Q	(Australia) Olivia Gadecki	6	6
(Chinese Taipei) Yang Ya-yi	1	6	6
Q	(United States) India Houghton	6	3	3
(Slovenia) Pia Lovrič	6	6
WC	(Australia) Natasha Russell	3	3
(Belgium) Sofia Costoulas	1	0
2	(United States) Robin Montgomery	6	6

Second round
(Germany) A Wirges	1	4
SE	(Italy) M Delai	6	6
(Czech Republic) K Lavičková	6^{5}	0
9	(Andorra) V Jiménez Kasintseva	7^{7}	6
Q	(Australia) O Gadecki	7	6^{9}	6
(Chinese Taipei) Y-y Yang	5	7^{11}	4
(Slovenia) P Lovrič	3	5
2	(United States) R Montgomery	6	7

Third round
SE	(Italy) M Delai	6	6^{7}	6^{7}
9	(Andorra) V Jiménez Kasintseva	3	7^{9}	7^{10}
Q	(Australia) O Gadecki	2	3
2	(United States) R Montgomery	6	6

Quarterfinals
9	(Andorra) V Jiménez Kasintseva	1	7	6
2	(United States) R Montgomery	6	5	2

== Qualifying ==
=== Seeds ===
1. (China) Li Zongyu (qualifying competition)
2. (United States) India Houghton (qualified)
3. (Slovakia) Romana Čisovská (qualifying competition)
4. (Japan) Saki Imamura (qualified)
5. (Germany) Eva Lys (qualified)
6. (Romania) Fatima Ingrid Amartha Keita (qualifying competition)
7. (Australia) Amy Stevens (qualified)
8. (United States) Kailey Evans (qualifying competition)
9. (China) Wang Jiaqi (qualifying competition)
10. (Croatia) Antonia Ružić (qualified)
11. (China) Dong Na (qualifying competition)
12. (United States) Hibah Shaikh (qualifying competition)
13. (Slovakia) Eszter Méri (qualifying competition)
14. (Italy) Lisa Pigato (qualified)
15. (United States) Tara Malik (first round)
16. (Australia) Tina Nadine Smith (qualified)

=== Qualifiers ===
1. (Italy) Lisa Pigato
2. (United States) India Houghton
3. (Australia) Olivia Gadecki
4. (Japan) Saki Imamura
5. (Germany) Eva Lys
6. (Croatia) Antonia Ružić
7. (Australia) Amy Stevens
8. (Australia) Tina Nadine Smith

=== Draw ===
==== First qualifier ====
First round
1	(China) Li Zongyu	7	4	7
(Bulgaria) Daniella Dimitrova	5	6	5
WC	(Australia) Taylah Lawless	3	2
14	(Italy) Lisa Pigato	6	6

Qualifying competition
1	(China) Li Zongyu	5	2
14	(Italy) Lisa Pigato	7	6

==== Second qualifier ====
First round
2	(United States) India Houghton	6	6
(Kazakhstan) Yelizaveta Karlova	2	4
WC	(Australia) Isabelle Papazyan	4	1
13	(Slovakia) Eszter Méri	6	6

Qualifying competition
2	(United States) India Houghton	6	6
13	(Slovakia) Eszter Méri	4	4

==== Third qualifier ====
First round
3	(Slovakia) Romana Čisovská	6	6
(Italy) Sofia Rocchetti	3	4
(Australia) Olivia Gadecki	6	6
15	(United States) Tara Malik	0	1

Qualifying competition
3	(Slovakia) Romana Čisovská	1	4
(Australia) Olivia Gadecki	6	6

==== Fourth qualifier ====
First round
4	(Japan) Saki Imamura	6	6
(Thailand) Punnin Kovapitukted	3	3
WC	(Australia) Jessie Culley	3	6	1
11	(China) Dong Na	6	3	6

Qualifying competition
4	(Japan) Saki Imamura	6	3	6
11	(China) Dong Na	0	6	0

==== Fifth qualifier ====
First round
5	(Germany) Eva Lys	6	6
(Australia) Roopa Bains	1	1
WC	(Australia) Sasha Nelson	2	0
12	(United States) Hibah Shaikh	6	6

Qualifying competition
5	(Germany) Eva Lys	6	6
12	(United States) Hibah Shaikh	4	1

==== Sixth qualifier ====
First round
6	(Romania) Fatima Ingrid Amartha Keita	7	6
WC	(Australia) Jasmine Adams	5	2
(Thailand) Pimrada Jattavapornvanit	6^{3}	3
10	(Croatia) Antonia Ružić	7^{7}	6

Qualifying competition
6	(Romania) Fatima Ingrid Amartha Keita	3	2
10	(Croatia) Antonia Ružić	6	6

==== Seventh qualifier ====
First round
7	(Australia) Amy Stevens	6	0
(India) Vipasha Mehra	2	0^{r}
(Chinese Taipei) Lee Kuan-yi	1	1
9	(China) Wang Jiaqi	6	6

Qualifying competition
7	(Australia) Amy Stevens	6	6
9	(China) Wang Jiaqi	4	2

==== Eighth qualifier ====
First round
8	(United States) Kailey Evans	6	6
(Italy) Matilde Mariani	3	2
(Japan) Manami Ukita	3	6	6^{5}
16	(Australia) Tina Nadine Smith	6	4	7^{10}

Qualifying competition
8	(United States) Kailey Evans	4	4
16	(Australia) Tina Nadine Smith	6	6
