= 2020 Australian Open – Women's doubles =

Women's doubles
- 2020 Australian Open

Final
- Champions: (Hungary) Tímea Babos (France) Kristina Mladenovic
- Runners-up: (Chinese Taipei) Hsieh Su-wei (Czech Republic) Barbora Strýcová
- Score: 6–2, 6–1

Details
- Draw: 64
- Seeds: 16

Events
| Singles | men | women | | boys | girls |
| Doubles | men | women | mixed | boys | girls |
| WC Singles | men | women | quad |
| WC Doubles | men | women | quad |
| Legends | men | women | mixed |
- Australian Open

Tímea Babos and Kristina Mladenovic defeated Hsieh Su-wei and Barbora Strýcová in the final, 6–2, 6–1 to win the women's doubles tennis title at the 2020 Australian Open. It was their second Australian Open title together. Despite the loss, Hsieh regained the WTA no. 1 doubles ranking for the first time since 2014, replacing her partner Strýcová. Mladenovic, Aryna Sabalenka and Xu Yifan were also in contention for the top ranking.

Samantha Stosur and Zhang Shuai were the defending champions, but chose not to participate together. Stosur played alongside Ellen Perez, but they lost in the first round to Lara Arruabarrena and Ons Jabeur. Zhang teamed up with Peng Shuai, but they lost to Veronika Kudermetova and Alison Riske, also in the first round.

== Seeds ==
1. (Chinese Taipei) Hsieh Su-wei / (Czech Republic) Barbora Strýcová (final)
2. (Hungary) Tímea Babos / (France) Kristina Mladenovic (champions)
3. (Belgium) Elise Mertens / (Belarus) Aryna Sabalenka (quarterfinals)
4. (Czech Republic) Barbora Krejčíková / (Czech Republic) Kateřina Siniaková (semifinals)
5. (United States) Nicole Melichar / (China) Xu Yifan (first round)
6. (Canada) Gabriela Dabrowski / (Latvia) Jeļena Ostapenko (quarterfinals)
7. (Chinese Taipei) Chan Hao-ching / (Chinese Taipei) Latisha Chan (semifinals)
8. (Czech Republic) Květa Peschke / (Netherlands) Demi Schuurs (second round)

9. (China) Duan Yingying / (China) Zheng Saisai (first round)
10. (Japan) Shuko Aoyama / (Japan) Ena Shibahara (third round)
11. (Czech Republic) Lucie Hradecká / (Slovenia) Andreja Klepač (first round)
12. (Australia) Ellen Perez / (Australia) Samantha Stosur (first round)
13. (Russia) Veronika Kudermetova / (United States) Alison Riske (third round)
14. (Ukraine) Lyudmyla Kichenok / (China) Yang Zhaoxuan (first round)
15. (Slovakia) Viktória Kužmová / (Belarus) Aliaksandra Sasnovich (third round)
16. (United States) Sofia Kenin / (United States) Bethanie Mattek-Sands (third round)

Click on the seed number of a player to go to their draw section.

== Draw ==
Key

- Q = Qualifier
- WC = Wild card
- LL = Lucky loser
- Alt = Alternate
- ITF = ITF entry
- PR = Protected ranking
- SR = Special ranking
- SE = Special exempt
- JE = Junior exempt
- JR = Junior Accelerator Programme entrant
- CO = College Accelerator Programme entrant
- NG = Next Gen Accelerator Program entrant
- w/o = Walkover
- r = Retired
- d = Defaulted

=== Finals ===
Quarterfinals
1 | (Chinese Taipei) Hsieh Su-wei (Czech Republic) Barbora Strýcová | 6 | 6
(United States) Jennifer Brady (United States) Caroline Dolehide | 2 | 2
4 | (Czech Republic) Barbora Krejčíková (Czech Republic) Kateřina Siniaková | 3 | 6 | 6
6 | (Canada) Gabriela Dabrowski (Latvia) Jeļena Ostapenko | 6 | 2 | 3
7 | (Chinese Taipei) Chan Hao-ching (Chinese Taipei) Latisha Chan | 7^{9} | 6
3 | (Belgium) Elise Mertens (Belarus) Aryna Sabalenka | 6^{7} | 2
(United States) Coco Gauff (United States) Caty McNally | 2 | 4
2 | (Hungary) Tímea Babos (France) Kristina Mladenovic | 6 | 6

Semifinals
1 | (Chinese Taipei) Hsieh Su-wei (Czech Republic) Barbora Strýcová | 6 | 6
4 | (Czech Republic) Barbora Krejčíková (Czech Republic) Kateřina Siniaková | 2 | 3
7 | (Chinese Taipei) Chan Hao-ching (Chinese Taipei) Latisha Chan | 5 | 2
2 | (Hungary) Tímea Babos (France) Kristina Mladenovic | 7 | 6

Final
1 | (Chinese Taipei) Hsieh Su-wei (Czech Republic) Barbora Strýcová | 2 | 1
2 | (Hungary) Tímea Babos (France) Kristina Mladenovic | 6 | 6

=== Top half ===
==== Section 1 ====
First round
1 | (Chinese Taipei) S-w Hsieh (Czech Republic) B Strýcová | 6 | 7
(Czech Republic) M Bouzková (Slovenia) T Zidanšek | 3 | 5
(United States) L Davis (Switzerland) V Golubic | 7^{7} | 1 | 6
WC | (Australia) D Aiava (Australia) L Cabrera | 6^{5} | 6 | 1
(Croatia) D Jurak (Serbia) N Stojanović | 6 | 6
PR | (Ukraine) K Bondarenko (Serbia) A Krunić | 1 | 4
WC | (Australia) M Inglis (Australia) K McPhee | 6 | 6
14 | (Ukraine) L Kichenok (China) Z Yang | 4 | 1
12 | (Australia) E Perez (Australia) S Stosur | 4 | 6 | 5
(Spain) L Arruabarrena (Tunisia) O Jabeur | 6 | 1 | 7
(United States) V King (United States) C McHale | 6 | 3 | 6^{1}
(United States) B Pera (Czech Republic) R Voráčová | 1 | 6 | 7^{10}
(Spain) G García Pérez (Spain) S Sorribes Tormo | 6 | 6
(Australia) M Adamczak (Slovenia) K Srebotnik | 2 | 4
(United States) J Brady (United States) C Dolehide | 6 | 6
5 | (United States) N Melichar (China) Y Xu | 3 | 4

Second round
1 | (Chinese Taipei) S-w Hsieh (Czech Republic) B Strýcová | 6 | 7
(United States) L Davis (Switzerland) V Golubic | 1 | 5
(Croatia) D Jurak (Serbia) N Stojanović | 3 | 6 | 6
WC | (Australia) M Inglis (Australia) K McPhee | 6 | 3 | 1
(Spain) L Arruabarrena (Tunisia) O Jabeur | 6 | 6
(United States) B Pera (Czech Republic) R Voráčová | 2 | 4
(Spain) G García Pérez (Spain) S Sorribes Tormo | 1 | 6 | 3
(United States) J Brady (United States) C Dolehide | 6 | 3 | 6

Third round
1 | (Chinese Taipei) S-w Hsieh (Czech Republic) B Strýcová | 6 | 6
(Croatia) D Jurak (Serbia) N Stojanović | 4 | 4
(Spain) L Arruabarrena (Tunisia) O Jabeur | 2 | 1
(United States) J Brady (United States) C Dolehide | 6 | 6

Quarterfinals
1 | (Chinese Taipei) S-w Hsieh (Czech Republic) B Strýcová | 6 | 6
(United States) J Brady (United States) C Dolehide | 2 | 2

==== Section 2 ====
First round
4 | (Czech Republic) B Krejčíková (Czech Republic) K Siniaková | 6 | 4 | 6
(Germany) A-L Friedsam (Germany) L Siegemund | 4 | 6 | 1
(Belgium) K Flipkens (United States) T Townsend | 6 | 6
(Germany) T Maria (Latvia) A Sevastova | 4 | 4
(United States) D Krawczyk (United States) J Pegula | 6 | 6
(Romania) I-C Begu (Czech Republic) Kr Plíšková | 3 | 2
WC | (Chinese Taipei) Y-h Lee (Chinese Taipei) F-h Wu | 4 | 3
16 | (United States) S Kenin (United States) B Mattek-Sands | 6 | 6
9 | (China) Y Duan (China) S Zheng | 3 | 2
(United States) H Carter (Brazil) L Stefani | 6 | 6
(China) X Han (China) L Zhu | 6 | 1
PR | (Ukraine) N Kichenok (India) S Mirza | 2 | 0^{r}
(United States) A Muhammad (United States) S Santamaria | 6 | 3 | 6
WC | (Australia) P Hon (Australia) S Sanders | 3 | 6 | 3
(Greece) M Sakkari (Australia) A Tomljanović | 5 | 3
6 | (Canada) G Dabrowski (Latvia) J Ostapenko | 7 | 6

Second round
4 | (Czech Republic) B Krejčíková (Czech Republic) K Siniaková | 3 | 6 | 6
(Belgium) K Flipkens (United States) T Townsend | 6 | 1 | 3
(United States) D Krawczyk (United States) J Pegula | 0 | 6^{7}
16 | (United States) S Kenin (United States) B Mattek-Sands | 6 | 7^{9}
(United States) H Carter (Brazil) L Stefani | 6 | 7
(China) X Han (China) L Zhu | 2 | 5
(United States) A Muhammad (United States) S Santamaria | 2 | 4
6 | (Canada) G Dabrowski (Latvia) J Ostapenko | 6 | 6

Third round
4 | (Czech Republic) B Krejčíková (Czech Republic) K Siniaková | 7 | 3 | 7
16 | (United States) S Kenin (United States) B Mattek-Sands | 5 | 6 | 5
(United States) H Carter (Brazil) L Stefani | 4 | 6 | 4
6 | (Canada) G Dabrowski (Latvia) J Ostapenko | 6 | 1 | 6

Quarterfinals
4 | (Czech Republic) B Krejčíková (Czech Republic) K Siniaková | 3 | 6 | 6
6 | (Canada) G Dabrowski (Latvia) J Ostapenko | 6 | 2 | 3

=== Bottom half ===
==== Section 3 ====
First round
7 | (Chinese Taipei) H-c Chan (Chinese Taipei) L Chan | 7^{7} | 6
(Georgia (country)) O Kalashnikova (Japan) M Kato | 6^{3} | 3
(Russia) E Alexandrova (Romania) I Bara | 1 | 2
(United States) K Christian (Chile) A Guarachi | 6 | 6
(Japan) M Doi (Romania) M Niculescu | 6^{5} | 6 | 6
(Russia) A Kalinskaya (Kazakhstan) Y Putintseva | 7^{7} | 4 | 2
(Japan) N Hibino (Japan) M Ninomiya | 6 | 6
11 | (Czech Republic) L Hradecká (Slovenia) A Klepač | 4 | 0
13 | (Russia) V Kudermetova (United States) A Riske | 6 | 6
(China) S Peng (China) S Zhang | 3 | 3
(Russia) A Blinkova (China) Y Wang | 5 | 0
(Estonia) A Kontaveit (Luxembourg) M Minella | 7 | 6
WC | (Australia) J Fourlis (Australia) Ar Rodionova | 7^{7} | 6
Alt | (Canada) S Fichman (Sweden) C Lister | 6^{4} | 2
PR | (United States) C Bellis (Czech Republic) M Vondroušová | 6 | 3 | 3
3 | (Belgium) E Mertens (Belarus) A Sabalenka | 3 | 6 | 6

Second round
7 | (Chinese Taipei) H-c Chan (Chinese Taipei) L Chan | 6 | 6
(United States) K Christian (Chile) A Guarachi | 4 | 2
(Japan) M Doi (Romania) M Niculescu | 6 | 7
(Japan) N Hibino (Japan) M Ninomiya | 2 | 5
13 | (Russia) V Kudermetova (United States) A Riske | 6 | 6
(Estonia) A Kontaveit (Luxembourg) M Minella | 4 | 4
WC | (Australia) J Fourlis (Australia) Ar Rodionova | 2 | 5
3 | (Belgium) E Mertens (Belarus) A Sabalenka | 6 | 7

Third round
7 | (Chinese Taipei) H-c Chan (Chinese Taipei) L Chan | 7^{7} | 6
(Japan) M Doi (Romania) M Niculescu | 6^{5} | 4
13 | (Russia) V Kudermetova (United States) A Riske | 7 | 3 | 2
3 | (Belgium) E Mertens (Belarus) A Sabalenka | 5 | 6 | 6

Quarterfinals
7 | (Chinese Taipei) H-c Chan (Chinese Taipei) L Chan | 7^{9} | 6
3 | (Belgium) E Mertens (Belarus) A Sabalenka | 6^{7} | 2

==== Section 4 ====
First round
8 | (Czech Republic) K Peschke (Netherlands) D Schuurs | 6 | 6
(Hungary) F Stollár (Ukraine) D Yastremska | 4 | 2
(Czech Republic) K Muchová (Switzerland) J Teichmann | 3 | 2
(United States) C Gauff (United States) C McNally | 6 | 6
(United States) D Collins (Poland) A Rosolska | 5 | 7 | 6
(Ukraine) K Kozlova (Poland) M Linette | 7 | 5 | 0
(Belgium) G Minnen (Belgium) A Van Uytvanck | 5 | 6^{2}
10 | (Japan) S Aoyama (Japan) E Shibahara | 7 | 7^{7}
15 | (Slovakia) V Kužmová (Belarus) A Sasnovich | 6 | 4 | 6
WC | (Australia) A Bozovic (Australia) A Marshall | 2 | 6 | 3
(France) A Cornet (France) F Ferro | 4 | 7^{7} | 6^{5}
(Kazakhstan) Z Diyas (Kazakhstan) E Rybakina | 6 | 6^{1} | 7^{10}
WC | (Australia) J Moore (Australia) A Sharma | 2 | 3
(Australia) A Barty (Germany) J Görges | 6 | 6
(Slovenia) D Jakupović (Romania) R Olaru | 5 | 3
2 | (Hungary) T Babos (France) K Mladenovic | 7 | 6

Second round
8 | (Czech Republic) K Peschke (Netherlands) D Schuurs | 3 | 4
(United States) C Gauff (United States) C McNally | 6 | 6
(United States) D Collins (Poland) A Rosolska
10 | (Japan) S Aoyama (Japan) E Shibahara | w/o
15 | (Slovakia) V Kužmová (Belarus) A Sasnovich | 6 | 7
(Kazakhstan) Z Diyas (Kazakhstan) E Rybakina | 4 | 5
(Australia) A Barty (Germany) J Görges | 5 | 4
2 | (Hungary) T Babos (France) K Mladenovic | 7 | 6

Third round
(United States) C Gauff (United States) C McNally | 4 | 7 | 6
10 | (Japan) S Aoyama (Japan) E Shibahara | 6 | 5 | 3
15 | (Slovakia) V Kužmová (Belarus) A Sasnovich | 6^{4} | 3
2 | (Hungary) T Babos (France) K Mladenovic | 7^{7} | 6

Quarterfinals
(United States) C Gauff (United States) C McNally | 2 | 4
2 | (Hungary) T Babos (France) K Mladenovic | 6 | 6

== Other entry information ==
=== Wild cards ===
- (Australia) Destanee Aiava / (Australia) Lizette Cabrera
- (Australia) Alexandra Bozovic / (Australia) Amber Marshall
- (Australia) Jaimee Fourlis / (Australia) Arina Rodionova
- (Australia) Priscilla Hon / (Australia) Storm Sanders
- (Australia) Maddison Inglis / (Australia) Kaylah McPhee
- (Chinese Taipei) Lee Ya-hsuan / (Chinese Taipei) Wu Fang-hsien
- (Australia) Jessica Moore / (Australia) Astra Sharma

=== Protected ranking ===
- (United States) Catherine Bellis / (Czech Republic) Markéta Vondroušová
- (Ukraine) Kateryna Bondarenko / (Serbia) Aleksandra Krunić
- (Ukraine) Nadiia Kichenok / (India) Sania Mirza

=== Alternate pairs ===
- (Canada) Sharon Fichman / (Sweden) Cornelia Lister

=== Withdrawals ===
- (Sweden) Johanna Larsson / (Sweden) Rebecca Peterson
