= 2020 Australian Open – Wheelchair women's singles =

Tennis tournament

Wheelchair women's singles
- 2020 Australian Open

Final
- Champion: (Japan) Yui Kamiji
- Runner-up: (Netherlands) Aniek van Koot
- Score: 6–2, 6–2

Details
- Draw: 8
- Seeds: 2

Events
Singles	men	women		boys	girls
Doubles	men	women	mixed	boys	girls
WC Singles	men	women	quad
WC Doubles	men	women	quad
Legends	men	women	mixed
← 2019 ·	Australian Open	· 2021 →

Yui Kamiji defeated Aniek van Koot in the final, 6–2, 6–2 to win the women's singles wheelchair tennis title at the 2020 Australian Open.

Diede de Groot was the two-time defending champion, but was defeated by Zhu Zhenzhen in the quarterfinals.

== Seeds ==
1. (Netherlands) Diede de Groot (quarterfinals)
2. (Japan) Yui Kamiji (champion)

== Draw ==
=== Key ===
- Q = Qualifier
- WC = Wild card
- LL = Lucky loser
- Alt = Alternate
- ITF = ITF entry
- PR = Protected ranking
- SR = Special ranking
- SE = Special exempt
- JE = Junior exempt
- JR = Junior Accelerator Programme entrant
- CO = College Accelerator Programme entrant
- NG = Next Gen Accelerator Program entrant
- w/o = Walkover
- r = Retired
- d = Defaulted

=== Bracket ===
Quarterfinals
1	(Netherlands) Diede de Groot	7^{7}	3	5
(China) Zhu Zhenzhen	6^{3}	6	7
(Netherlands) Marjolein Buis	6^{7}	4
(Netherlands) Aniek van Koot	7^{9}	6
(South Africa) Kgothatso Montjane	6	6
(Germany) Sabine Ellerbrock	0	1
(United Kingdom) Jordanne Whiley	2	6^{5}
2	(Japan) Yui Kamiji	6	7^{7}

Semifinals
(China) Zhu Zhenzhen	6	0	4
(Netherlands) Aniek van Koot	1	6	6
(South Africa) Kgothatso Montjane	3	5
2	(Japan) Yui Kamiji	6	7

Final
(Netherlands) Aniek van Koot	2	2
2	(Japan) Yui Kamiji	6	6
