= 2020 Australian Open – Mixed doubles =

Mixed doubles
- 2020 Australian Open

Final
- Champions: (Czech Republic) Barbora Krejčíková (Croatia) Nikola Mektić
- Runners-up: (United States) Bethanie Mattek-Sands (United Kingdom) Jamie Murray
- Score: 5–7, 6–4, [10–1]

Details
- Draw: 32
- Seeds: 8

Events
Singles	men	women		boys	girls
Doubles	men	women	mixed	boys	girls
WC Singles	men	women	quad
WC Doubles	men	women	quad
Legends	men	women	mixed
- Australian Open

Defending champion Barbora Krejčíková and her partner Nikola Mektić defeated Bethanie Mattek-Sands and Jamie Murray in the final, 5–7, 6–4, [10–1] to win the mixed doubles tennis title at the 2020 Australian Open.

Krejčíková and Rajeev Ram were the reigning champions, but Ram chose not to participate. This tournament marked the final major appearance of 10-time mixed doubles major champion Leander Paes.

== Seeds ==
1. (Czech Republic) Barbora Strýcová / (Brazil) Marcelo Melo (first round)
2. (China) Zhang Shuai / (France) Nicolas Mahut (withdrew)
3. (Canada) Gabriela Dabrowski / (Finland) Henri Kontinen (semifinals)
4. (Chinese Taipei) Chan Hao-ching / (New Zealand) Michael Venus (second round)
5. (Czech Republic) Barbora Krejčíková / (Croatia) Nikola Mektić (champions)
6. (Chinese Taipei) Latisha Chan / (Croatia) Ivan Dodig (quarterfinals)
7. (Australia) Samantha Stosur / (Netherlands) Jean-Julien Rojer (second round)
8. (Chinese Taipei) Hsieh Su-wei / (United Kingdom) Neal Skupski (second round)

== Draw ==
Key

- Q = Qualifier
- WC = Wild card
- LL = Lucky loser
- Alt = Alternate
- ITF = ITF entry
- PR = Protected ranking
- SR = Special ranking
- SE = Special exempt
- JE = Junior exempt
- JR = Junior Accelerator Programme entrant
- CO = College Accelerator Programme entrant
- NG = Next Gen Accelerator Program entrant
- w/o = Walkover
- r = Retired
- d = Defaulted

=== Finals ===
Semifinals
(United States) Bethanie Mattek-Sands (United Kingdom) Jamie Murray	6	7^{7}
WC	(Australia) Astra Sharma (Australia) John-Patrick Smith	3	6^{4}
3	(Canada) Gabriela Dabrowski (Finland) Henri Kontinen	6	3	[5]
5	(Czech Republic) Barbora Krejčíková (Croatia) Nikola Mektić	3	6	[10]

Final
(United States) Bethanie Mattek-Sands (United Kingdom) Jamie Murray	7	4	[1]
5	(Czech Republic) Barbora Krejčíková (Croatia) Nikola Mektić	5	6	[10]

=== Top half ===
First round
1	(Czech Republic) B Strýcová (Brazil) M Melo	6	4	[7]
(United States) B Mattek-Sands (United Kingdom) J Murray	3	6	[10]
WC	(Australia) S Sanders (Australia) M Polmans	7^{7}	3	[6]
WC	(Latvia) J Ostapenko (India) L Paes	6^{4}	6	[10]
(United States) V Williams (Colombia) JS Cabal	6	3	[4]
(China) S Zheng (Belgium) J Vliegen	3	6	[10]
(United States) D Krawczyk (United Kingdom) J Salisbury	6^{5}	7	[5]
8	(Chinese Taipei) S-w Hsieh (United Kingdom) N Skupski	7^{7}	5	[10]
4	(Chinese Taipei) H-c Chan (New Zealand) M Venus	5	7^{7}	[10]
(China) Y Duan (Brazil) M Demoliner	7	6^{5}	[8]
(Poland) I Świątek (Poland) Ł Kubot	6	7
WC	(Australia) E Perez (Australia) L Saville	4	5
WC	(Australia) B Woolcock (Australia) B Mott	3	3
WC	(Australia) A Sharma (Australia) J-P Smith	6	6
(Slovakia) V Kužmová (Slovakia) F Polášek	1	2
7	(Australia) S Stosur (Netherlands) J-J Rojer	6	6

Second round
(United States) B Mattek-Sands (United Kingdom) J Murray	6	7
WC	(Latvia) J Ostapenko (India) L Paes	2	5
(China) S Zheng (Belgium) J Vliegen	3	6	[11]
8	(Chinese Taipei) S-w Hsieh (United Kingdom) N Skupski	6	3	[9]
4	(Chinese Taipei) H-c Chan (New Zealand) M Venus	2	3
(Poland) I Świątek (Poland) Ł Kubot	6	6
WC	(Australia) A Sharma (Australia) J-P Smith	6	4	[10]
7	(Australia) S Stosur (Netherlands) J-J Rojer	3	6	[4]

Quarterfinals
(United States) B Mattek-Sands (United Kingdom) J Murray	6	6
(China) S Zheng (Belgium) J Vliegen	3	4
(Poland) I Świątek (Poland) Ł Kubot	6	6^{4}	[3]
WC	(Australia) A Sharma (Australia) J-P Smith	3	7^{7}	[10]

Semifinals
(United States) B Mattek-Sands (United Kingdom) J Murray	6	7^{7}
WC	(Australia) A Sharma (Australia) J-P Smith	3	6^{4}

=== Bottom half ===
First round
6	(Chinese Taipei) L Chan (Croatia) I Dodig	7^{7}	7
WC	(Australia) Ar Rodionova (Australia) A Harris	6^{2}	5
(Slovenia) A Klepač (France) É Roger-Vasselin	6	6
(Belgium) K Flipkens (Austria) J Melzer	2	3
WC	(Australia) J Moore (Australia) M Ebden	7	7
(Croatia) D Jurak (France) F Martin	5	5
(Czech Republic) L Hradecká (Germany) K Krawietz	2	4
3	(Canada) G Dabrowski (Finland) H Kontinen	6	6
5	(Czech Republic) B Krejčíková (Croatia) N Mektić	7	6
(Czech Republic) K Peschke (Netherlands) W Koolhof	5	2
(United States) A Anisimova (Australia) N Kyrgios	7	6
WC	(Australia) M Adamczak (Spain) D Vega Hernández	5	4
(United States) N Melichar (Brazil) B Soares	6	6
(Poland) A Rosolska (Germany) A Mies	2	4
(Ukraine) N Kichenok (India) R Bopanna	7	4	[10]
Alt	(Ukraine) L Kichenok (United States) A Krajicek	5	6	[6]

Second round
6	(Chinese Taipei) L Chan (Croatia) I Dodig	6	4	[10]
(Slovenia) A Klepač (France) É Roger-Vasselin	3	6	[8]
WC	(Australia) J Moore (Australia) M Ebden	5	6^{5}
3	(Canada) G Dabrowski (Finland) H Kontinen	7	7^{7}
5	(Czech Republic) B Krejčíková (Croatia) N Mektić	4	6	[10]
(United States) A Anisimova (Australia) N Kyrgios	6	4	[8]
(United States) N Melichar (Brazil) B Soares	4	6^{4}
(Ukraine) N Kichenok (India) R Bopanna	6	7^{7}

Quarterfinals
6	(Chinese Taipei) L Chan (Croatia) I Dodig	5	6^{2}
3	(Canada) G Dabrowski (Finland) H Kontinen	7	7^{7}
5	(Czech Republic) B Krejčíková (Croatia) N Mektić	6	6
(Ukraine) N Kichenok (India) R Bopanna	0	2

Semifinals
3	(Canada) G Dabrowski (Finland) H Kontinen	6	3	[5]
5	(Czech Republic) B Krejčíková (Croatia) N Mektić	3	6	[10]

== Other entry information ==
=== Wild cards ===
- (Australia) Monique Adamczak / (Spain) David Vega Hernández
- (Australia) Jessica Moore / (Australia) Matthew Ebden
- (Latvia) Jeļena Ostapenko / (India) Leander Paes
- (Australia) Ellen Perez / (Australia) Luke Saville
- (Australia) Arina Rodionova / (Australia) Andrew Harris
- (Australia) Storm Sanders / (Australia) Marc Polmans
- (Australia) Astra Sharma / (Australia) John-Patrick Smith
- (Australia) Belinda Woolcock / (Australia) Blake Mott

=== Alternate pairs ===
- (Ukraine) Lyudmyla Kichenok / (United States) Austin Krajicek

=== Withdrawals ===
- (China) Zhang Shuai / (France) Nicolas Mahut
