= 2020 Australian Open – Women's legends' doubles =

Women's legends' doubles
- 2020 Australian Open

Events
Singles	men	women		boys	girls
Doubles	men	women	mixed	boys	girls
WC Singles	men	women	quad
WC Doubles	men	women	quad
Legends	men	women	mixed
← 2019 ·	Australian Open	· 2021 →

== Draw ==
=== Key ===
- Q = Qualifier
- WC = Wild card
- LL = Lucky loser
- Alt = Alternate
- ITF = ITF entry
- PR = Protected ranking
- SR = Special ranking
- SE = Special exempt
- JE = Junior exempt
- JR = Junior Accelerator Programme entrant
- CO = College Accelerator Programme entrant
- NG = Next Gen Accelerator Program entrant
- w/o = Walkover
- r = Retired
- d = Defaulted

=== Final ===
Final
(Slovakia) Daniela Hantuchová (United States) Martina Navratilova

=== Group stage ===
		(Slovakia) Hantuchová (United States) Navratilova	(Australia) Bradtke (United States) Fernández	(Croatia) Majoli (Australia) Stubbs	(Australia) Dokic (Russia) Safina	RR; W–L	Set; W–L	Game; W–L	Standings
1	(Slovakia) Daniela Hantuchová (United States) Martina Navratilova		4–1, 4–2	4–1, 4–1	4–2, 4–2	3–0	6–0	24–9	1
2	(Australia) Nicole Bradtke (United States) Mary Joe Fernández	1–4, 2–4		4–2, 2–4, 4–1		1–1	2–3	13–15	2
3	(Croatia) Iva Majoli (Australia) Rennae Stubbs	1–4, 1–4	2–4, 4–2, 1–4		2–4, 4–3^{(5–4)}, 3–4^{(0–5)}	0–3	2–6	18–29	4
4	(Australia) Jelena Dokic (Russia) Dinara Safina	2–4, 2–4		4–2, 3–4^{(4–5)}, 4–3^{(5–0)}		1–1	2–3	15–17	3
