= 2020 Australian Open – Wheelchair men's singles =

Wheelchair men's singles
- 2020 Australian Open

Final
- Champion: (Japan) Shingo Kunieda
- Runner-up: (United Kingdom) Gordon Reid
- Score: 6–4, 6–4

Events
Singles	men	women		boys	girls
Doubles	men	women	mixed	boys	girls
WC Singles	men	women	quad
WC Doubles	men	women	quad
Legends	men	women	mixed
- Australian Open

Shingo Kunieda defeated Gordon Reid in the final, 6–4, 6–4 to win the men's singles wheelchair tennis title at the 2020 Australian Open. It was his tenth Australian Open singles title and 23rd major singles title overall.

Gustavo Fernández was the defending champion, but was defeated by Reid in the quarterfinals.

== Seeds ==
1. (Japan) Shingo Kunieda (champion)
2. (Argentina) Gustavo Fernández (quarterfinals)

== Draw ==
Key

- Q = Qualifier
- WC = Wild card
- LL = Lucky loser
- Alt = Alternate
- ITF = ITF entry
- PR = Protected ranking
- SR = Special ranking
- SE = Special exempt
- JE = Junior exempt
- JR = Junior Accelerator Programme entrant
- CO = College Accelerator Programme entrant
- NG = Next Gen Accelerator Program entrant
- w/o = Walkover
- r = Retired
- d = Defaulted

=== Bracket ===
Quarterfinals
1	(Japan) Shingo Kunieda	6	6
(France) Nicolas Peifer	4	4
(France) Stéphane Houdet	3	4
(United Kingdom) Alfie Hewett	6	6
WC	(Australia) Ben Weekes	0	2
(Belgium) Joachim Gérard	6	6
(United Kingdom) Gordon Reid	6	6^{3}	6
2	(Argentina) Gustavo Fernández	3	7^{7}	2

Semifinals
1	(Japan) Shingo Kunieda	6	6
(United Kingdom) Alfie Hewett	3	3
(Belgium) Joachim Gérard	4	5
(United Kingdom) Gordon Reid	6	7

Final
1	(Japan) Shingo Kunieda	6	6
(United Kingdom) Gordon Reid	4	4
