= 2020 Australian Open – Wheelchair quad singles =

Wheelchair quad singles
- 2020 Australian Open

Final
- Champion: (Australia) Dylan Alcott
- Runner-up: (United Kingdom) Andy Lapthorne
- Score: 6–0, 6–4

Events
| Singles | men | women | | boys | girls |
| Doubles | men | women | mixed | boys | girls |
| WC Singles | men | women | quad |
| WC Doubles | men | women | quad |
| Legends | men | women | mixed |
- Australian Open

Five-time defending champion Dylan Alcott defeated Andy Lapthorne in the final, 6–0, 6–4 to win the quad singles wheelchair tennis title at the 2020 Australian Open.

== Seeds ==
1. (Australia) Dylan Alcott (champion)
2. (United Kingdom) Andy Lapthorne (final)

== Draw ==
Key

- Q = Qualifier
- WC = Wild card
- LL = Lucky loser
- Alt = Alternate
- ITF = ITF entry
- PR = Protected ranking
- SR = Special ranking
- SE = Special exempt
- JE = Junior exempt
- JR = Junior Accelerator Programme entrant
- CO = College Accelerator Programme entrant
- NG = Next Gen Accelerator Program entrant
- w/o = Walkover
- r = Retired
- d = Defaulted

=== Final ===
| Final |
| 1 | (Australia) Dylan Alcott | 6 | 6 |
| 2 | (United Kingdom) Andy Lapthorne | 0 | 4 |

=== Round robin ===
| | | (Australia) Alcott | (United Kingdom) Lapthorne | (United States) Wagner | (Australia) Davidson | RR; W–L | Set; W–L | Game; W–L | Standings |
| 1 | (Australia) Dylan Alcott | | 7–5, 6–1 | 6–3, 6–1 | 6–2, 6–0 | 3–0 | 6–0 | 37–12 | 1 |
| 2 | (United Kingdom) Andy Lapthorne | 5–7, 1–6 | | 6–3, 7–6^{(8–6)} | 7–6^{(7–5)}, 3–6, 7–6^{(10–8)} | 2–1 | 4–3 | 36–40 | 2 |
| | (United States) David Wagner | 3–6, 1–6 | 3–6, 6–7^{(6–8)} | | 6–2, 6–3 | 1–2 | 2–4 | 25–30 | 3 |
| WC | (Australia) Heath Davidson | 2–6, 0–6 | 6–7^{(5–7)}, 6–3, 6–7^{(8–10)} | 2–6, 3–6 | | 0–3 | 1–6 | 25–41 | 4 |
