= 2020 Australian Open – Wheelchair women's doubles =

Wheelchair women's doubles
- 2020 Australian Open

Final
- Champion: (Japan) Yui Kamiji (United Kingdom) Jordanne Whiley
- Runner-up: (Netherlands) Diede de Groot (Netherlands) Aniek van Koot
- Score: 6–2, 6–4

Details
- Draw: 4
- Seeds: 2

Events
Singles	men	women		boys	girls
Doubles	men	women	mixed	boys	girls
WC Singles	men	women	quad
WC Doubles	men	women	quad
Legends	men	women	mixed
← 2019 ·	Australian Open	· 2021 →

Yui Kamiji and Jordanne Whiley defeated the defending champions Diede de Groot and Aniek van Koot in the final, 6–2, 6–4 to win the women's doubles wheelchair tennis title at the 2020 Australian Open. It was their third Australian Open title as a pair, and Kamiji's fifth title in doubles (alongside two titles won with Marjolein Buis).

== Seeds ==
1. (Netherlands) Diede de Groot / (Netherlands) Aniek van Koot (final)
2. (Germany) Sabine Ellerbrock / (South Africa) Kgothatso Montjane (semifinals)

== Draw ==
=== Key ===
- Q = Qualifier
- WC = Wild card
- LL = Lucky loser
- Alt = Alternate
- ITF = ITF entry
- PR = Protected ranking
- SR = Special ranking
- SE = Special exempt
- JE = Junior exempt
- JR = Junior Accelerator Programme entrant
- CO = College Accelerator Programme entrant
- NG = Next Gen Accelerator Program entrant
- w/o = Walkover
- r = Retired
- d = Defaulted

=== Bracket ===
Semifinals
1	(Netherlands) Diede de Groot (Netherlands) Aniek van Koot	6	6
(Netherlands) Marjolein Buis (China) Zhu Zhenzhen	3	3
(Japan) Yui Kamiji (United Kingdom) Jordanne Whiley	6	6
2	(Germany) Sabine Ellerbrock (South Africa) Kgothatso Montjane	1	4

Final
1	(Netherlands) Diede de Groot (Netherlands) Aniek van Koot	2	4
(Japan) Yui Kamiji (United Kingdom) Jordanne Whiley	6	6
