= 2020 Australian Open – Boys' doubles =

Boys' doubles
- 2020 Australian Open

Final
- Champions: (Romania) David Ionel (Switzerland) Leandro Riedi
- Runners-up: (Poland) Mikołaj Lorens (Latvia) Kārlis Ozoliņš
- Score: 6–7^{(8–10)}, 7–5, [10–4]

Events
Singles	men	women		boys	girls
Doubles	men	women	mixed	boys	girls
WC Singles	men	women	quad
WC Doubles	men	women	quad
Legends	men	women	mixed
- Australian Open

David Ionel and Leandro Riedi won the boys' doubles tennis title at the 2020 Australian Open, defeating Mikołaj Lorens and Kārlis Ozoliņš in the final, 6–7^{(8–10)}, 7–5, [10–4].

Jonáš Forejtek and Dalibor Svrčina were the defending champions, but Forejtek was no longer eligible to compete in junior events. Svrčina played alongside Jeffrey von der Schulenburg, but lost in the quarterfinals to Jérôme Kym and Dominic Stricker.

== Seeds ==
1. (France) Arthur Cazaux / (France) Harold Mayot (quarterfinals)
2. (Czech Republic) Dalibor Svrčina / (Switzerland) Jeffrey von der Schulenburg (quarterfinals)
3. (Japan) Shunsuke Mitsui / (China) Bu Yunchaokete (quarterfinals)
4. (Ivory Coast) Eliakim Coulibaly / (South Africa) Khololwam Montsi (first round)
5. (Romania) David Ionel / (Switzerland) Leandro Riedi (champions)
6. (Poland) Mikołaj Lorens / (Latvia) Kārlis Ozoliņš (final)
7. (United Kingdom) Arthur Fery / (United Kingdom) Felix Gill (semifinals)
8. (France) Térence Atmane / (France) Timo Legout (first round)

== Draw ==
Key

- Q = Qualifier
- WC = Wild card
- LL = Lucky loser
- Alt = Alternate
- ITF = ITF entry
- PR = Protected ranking
- SR = Special ranking
- SE = Special exempt
- JE = Junior exempt
- JR = Junior Accelerator Programme entrant
- CO = College Accelerator Programme entrant
- NG = Next Gen Accelerator Program entrant
- w/o = Walkover
- r = Retired
- d = Defaulted

=== Finals ===
Semifinals
6	(Poland) Mikołaj Lorens (Latvia) Kārlis Ozoliņš	6	6^{4}	[10]
7	(United Kingdom) Arthur Fery (United Kingdom) Felix Gill	4	7^{7}	[7]
5	(Romania) David Ionel (Switzerland) Leandro Riedi	7	6
(Switzerland) Jérôme Kym (Switzerland) Dominic Stricker	5	4

Final
6	(Poland) Mikołaj Lorens (Latvia) Kārlis Ozoliņš	7^{10}	5	[4]
5	(Romania) David Ionel (Switzerland) Leandro Riedi	6^{8}	7	[10]

=== Top half ===
First round
1	(France) Arthur Cazaux (France) Harold Mayot	6	6
(Venezuela) Lorenzo Claverie (United States) Aidan Mayo	3	2
(Serbia) Hamad Međedović (Russia) Marat Sharipov	5	7	[8]
(United States) Dali Blanch (Belgium) Alexander Hoogmartens	7	5	[10]
Alt	(Australia) Matthew Bosancic (China) Zhang Yu	3	4
WC	(Australia) Casey Hoole (Australia) Cooper White	6	6
(Austria) Lukas Neumayer (Netherlands) Stijn Pel	4	6^{6}
6	(Poland) Mikołaj Lorens (Latvia) Kārlis Ozoliņš	6	7^{8}
3	(Japan) Shunsuke Mitsui (China) Bu Yunchaokete	7	4	[10]
(Italy) Luca Nardi (Italy) Lorenzo Rottoli	5	6	[7]
(United States) Alexander Bernard (United States) Cash Hanzlik	3	7	[6]
(Germany) Benito Sanchez Martinez (Germany) Max Wiskandt	6	5	[10]
(Hungary) Péter Fajta (Romania) Sebastian Gima	6	6
WC	(Australia) Derek Pham (Australia) Edward Vo	2	2
(New Zealand) Corban Crowther (Thailand) Patorn Hanchaikul	1	4
7	(United Kingdom) Arthur Fery (United Kingdom) Felix Gill	6	6

Second round
1	(France) A Cazaux (France) H Mayot	3	7	[10]
(United States) Dal Blanch (Belgium) A Hoogmartens	6	5	[4]
WC	(Australia) C Hoole (Australia) C White	4	7^{7}	[7]
6	(Poland) M Lorens (Latvia) K Ozoliņš	6	6^{5}	[10]
3	(Japan) S Mitsui (China) Y Bu	6	6
(Germany) B Sanchez Martinez (Germany) M Wiskandt	2	4
(Hungary) P Fajta (Romania) S Gima	3	2
7	(United Kingdom) A Fery (United Kingdom) F Gill	6	6

Quarterfinals
1	(France) A Cazaux (France) H Mayot	4	6	[7]
6	(Poland) M Lorens (Latvia) K Ozoliņš	6	2	[10]
3	(Japan) S Mitsui (China) Y Bu	2	6^{6}
7	(United Kingdom) A Fery (United Kingdom) F Gill	6	7^{8}

Semifinals
6	(Poland) M Lorens (Latvia) K Ozoliņš	6	6^{4}	[10]
7	(United Kingdom) A Fery (United Kingdom) F Gill	4	7^{7}	[7]

=== Bottom half ===
First round
5	(Romania) David Ionel (Switzerland) Leandro Riedi	6	6
(France) Giovanni Mpetshi Perricard (France) Max Westphal	3	2
(Brazil) Gustavo Heide (India) Dev Javia	3	3
(Russia) Egor Agafonov (Russia) Evgeny Philippov	6	6
WC	(Australia) James McCabe (Australia) Edward Winter	6	6
(China) Li Hanwen (China) Wang Xiaofei	2	2
(Italy) Francesco Maestrelli (Italy) Samuel Vincent Ruggeri	6	7
4	(Ivory Coast) Eliakim Coulibaly (South Africa) Khololwam Montsi	3	5
8	(France) Térence Atmane (France) Timo Legout	4	5
(Switzerland) Jérôme Kym (Switzerland) Dominic Stricker	6	7
WC	(Australia) Tai Sach (Australia) Philip Sekulic	6^{8}	6	[8]
(Czech Republic) Martin Krumich (Hong Kong) Coleman Wong	7^{10}	4	[10]
Alt	(Republic of Ireland) Ammar Elamin (Slovakia) Lukáš Palovič	7^{7}	5	[7]
(Italy) Flavio Cobolli (Italy) Matteo Gigante	6^{5}	7	[10]
(Australia) Alex Bulte (Australia) Chen Dong	3	4
2	(Czech Republic) Dalibor Svrčina (Switzerland) Jeffrey von der Schulenburg	6	6

Second round
5	(Romania) D Ionel (Switzerland) L Riedi	6	6
(Russia) E Agafonov (Russia) E Philippov	2	2
WC	(Australia) J McCabe (Australia) E Winter	4	3
(Italy) F Maestrelli (Italy) S Vincent Ruggeri	6	6
(Switzerland) J Kym (Switzerland) D Stricker	6	6
(Czech Republic) M Krumich (Hong Kong) C Wong	4	4
(Italy) F Cobolli (Italy) M Gigante	4	2
2	(Czech Republic) D Svrčina (Switzerland) J von der Schulenburg	6	6

Quarterfinals
5	(Romania) D Ionel (Switzerland) L Riedi	6	6
(Italy) F Maestrelli (Italy) S Vincent Ruggeri	4	2
(Switzerland) J Kym (Switzerland) D Stricker	6	6
2	(Czech Republic) D Svrčina (Switzerland) J von der Schulenburg	4	4

Semifinals
5	(Romania) D Ionel (Switzerland) L Riedi	7	6
(Switzerland) J Kym (Switzerland) D Stricker	5	4
