= 2020 Australian Open – Wheelchair quad doubles =

Wheelchair quad doubles
- 2020 Australian Open

Final
- Champions: (Australia) Dylan Alcott (Australia) Heath Davidson
- Runners-up: (United Kingdom) Andy Lapthorne (United States) David Wagner
- Score: 6–4, 6–3

Events
Singles	men	women		boys	girls
Doubles	men	women	mixed	boys	girls
WC Singles	men	women	quad
WC Doubles	men	women	quad
Legends	men	women	mixed
- Australian Open

Two-time defending champions Dylan Alcott and Heath Davidson defeated Andy Lapthorne and David Wagner in the final, 6–4, 6–3 to win the quad doubles wheelchair tennis title at the 2020 Australian Open.

== Seeds ==
1. (Australia) Dylan Alcott / (Australia) Heath Davidson (champions)
2. (United Kingdom) Andy Lapthorne / (United States) David Wagner (final)

== Draw ==
Key

- Q = Qualifier
- WC = Wild card
- LL = Lucky loser
- Alt = Alternate
- ITF = ITF entry
- PR = Protected ranking
- SR = Special ranking
- SE = Special exempt
- JE = Junior exempt
- JR = Junior Accelerator Programme entrant
- CO = College Accelerator Programme entrant
- NG = Next Gen Accelerator Program entrant
- w/o = Walkover
- r = Retired
- d = Defaulted

Final
1	(Australia) Dylan Alcott (Australia) Heath Davidson	6	6
2	(United Kingdom) Andy Lapthorne (United States) David Wagner	4	3
