= 2020 Australian Open – Girls' doubles =

Girls' doubles
- 2020 Australian Open

Final
- Champions: (Philippines) Alexandra Eala (Indonesia) Priska Madelyn Nugroho
- Runners-up: (Slovenia) Živa Falkner (United Kingdom) Matilda Mutavdzic
- Score: 6–1, 6–2

Events
Singles	men	women		boys	girls
Doubles	men	women	mixed	boys	girls
WC Singles	men	women	quad
WC Doubles	men	women	quad
Legends	men	women	mixed
- Australian Open

Alex Eala and Priska Madelyn Nugroho won the girls' doubles tennis title at the 2020 Australian Open, defeating Živa Falkner and Matilda Mutavdzic in the final, 6–1, 6–2.

Natsumi Kawaguchi and Adrienn Nagy were the defending champions, but Nagy was no longer eligible to compete in junior events, while Kawaguchi chose not to participate.

== Seeds ==
1. (Latvia) Kamilla Bartone / (Czech Republic) Linda Fruhvirtová (semifinals)
2. (Russia) Polina Kudermetova / (United States) Robin Montgomery (first round)
3. (Russia) Maria Bondarenko / (Thailand) Mai Napatt Nirundorn (first round)
4. (Philippines) Alex Eala / (Indonesia) Priska Madelyn Nugroho (champions)
5. (Andorra) Victoria Jiménez Kasintseva / (Spain) Ane Mintegi del Olmo (first round)
6. (Czech Republic) Linda Nosková / (Russia) Oksana Selekhmeteva (quarterfinals)
7. (France) Aubane Droguet / (France) Séléna Janicijevic (quarterfinals)
8. (South Korea) Back Da-yeon / (Poland) Weronika Baszak (second round)

== Draw ==
Key

- Q = Qualifier
- WC = Wild card
- LL = Lucky loser
- Alt = Alternate
- ITF = ITF entry
- PR = Protected ranking
- SR = Special ranking
- SE = Special exempt
- JE = Junior exempt
- JR = Junior Accelerator Programme entrant
- CO = College Accelerator Programme entrant
- NG = Next Gen Accelerator Program entrant
- w/o = Walkover
- r = Retired
- d = Defaulted

=== Finals ===
Semifinals
1	(Latvia) Kamilla Bartone (Czech Republic) Linda Fruhvirtová	6	5	[8]
4	(Philippines) Alex Eala (Indonesia) Priska Madelyn Nugroho	1	7	[10]
(United States) Savannah Broadus (United States) Elizabeth Coleman	4	6	[8]
(Slovenia) Živa Falkner (United Kingdom) Matilda Mutavdzic	6	4	[10]

Final
4	(Philippines) Alex Eala (Indonesia) Priska Madelyn Nugroho	6	6
(Slovenia) Živa Falkner (United Kingdom) Matilda Mutavdzic	1	2

=== Top half ===
First round
1	(Latvia) Kamilla Bartone (Czech Republic) Linda Fruhvirtová	6	3	[10]
(Russia) Erika Andreeva (United Kingdom) Amarni Banks	4	6	[6]
WC	(Australia) Roopa Bains (Australia) Mia Repac	3	6^{5}
(Czech Republic) Kristýna Lavičková (Czech Republic) Darja Viďmanová	6	7^{7}
(France) Giulia Morlet (Russia) Diana Shnaider	6	7
(Uruguay) Guillermina Grant (Germany) Angelina Wirges	3	5
(Germany) Mara Guth (Latvia) Darja Semenistaja	1	2
6	(Czech Republic) Linda Nosková (Russia) Oksana Selekhmeteva	6	6
4	(Philippines) Alex Eala (Indonesia) Priska Madelyn Nugroho	7	4	[10]
(Russia) Elina Avanesyan (Ukraine) Liubov Kostenko	5	6	[8]
(France) Julie Belgraver (Slovenia) Pia Lovrič	6	3	[10]
WC	(Australia) Charlotte Kempenaers-Pocz (Australia) Natasha Russell	2	6	[6]
(Canada) Jada Bui (Canada) Mélodie Collard	4	2
(China) Bai Zhuoxuan (Chinese Taipei) Yang Ya-yi	6	6
(Australia) Talia Gibson (Australia) Annerly Poulos	6^{6}	6	[9]
7	(France) Aubane Droguet (France) Séléna Janicijevic	7^{8}	1	[11]

Second round
1	(Latvia) K Bartone (Czech Republic) L Fruhvirtová	6^{4}	7^{7}	[10]
(Czech Republic) K Lavičková (Czech Republic) D Viďmanová	7^{7}	6^{1}	[8]
(France) G Morlet (Russia) D Shnaider	7^{7}	5	[8]
6	(Czech Republic) L Nosková (Russia) O Selekhmeteva	6^{4}	7	[10]
4	(Philippines) A Eala (Indonesia) PM Nugroho	6	4	[11]
(France) J Belgraver (Slovenia) P Lovrič	2	6	[9]
(China) Z Bai (Chinese Taipei) Y-y Yang	6	5	[4]
7	(France) A Droguet (France) S Janicijevic	3	7	[10]

Quarterfinals
1	(Latvia) K Bartone (Czech Republic) L Fruhvirtová	6	7
6	(Czech Republic) L Nosková (Russia) O Selekhmeteva	1	5
4	(Philippines) A Eala (Indonesia) PM Nugroho	7^{7}	6
7	(France) A Droguet (France) S Janicijevic	6^{2}	2

Semifinals
1	(Latvia) K Bartone (Czech Republic) L Fruhvirtová	6	5	[8]
4	(Philippines) A Eala (Indonesia) PM Nugroho	1	7	[10]

=== Bottom half ===
First round
5	(Andorra) Victoria Jiménez Kasintseva (Spain) Ane Mintegi del Olmo	3	4
(Belgium) Sofia Costoulas (Croatia) Antonia Ružić	6	6
(Australia) Olivia Gadecki (Australia) Amy Stevens	6	6
(Italy) Melania Delai (Italy) Lisa Pigato	4	3
(United States) India Houghton (France) Célia-Belle Mohr	4	7^{13}	[8]
(United States) Savannah Broadus (United States) Elizabeth Coleman	6	6^{11}	[10]
WC	(Australia) Jasmine Adams (Australia) Tina Nadine Smith	1	6	[10]
3	(Russia) Maria Bondarenko (Thailand) Mai Napatt Nirundorn	6	0	[2]
8	(South Korea) Back Da-yeon (Poland) Weronika Baszak	6	6
Alt	(South Korea) Ku Yeon-woo (Japan) Manami Ukita	2	4
(Romania) Fatima Ingrid Amartha Keita (Israel) Shavit Kimchi	4	6	[17]
WC	(Australia) Jessie Culley (Australia) Taylah Preston	6	4	[15]
Alt	(Japan) Saki Imamura (Japan) Erika Matsuda	6	4	[8]
(Slovenia) Živa Falkner (United Kingdom) Matilda Mutavdzic	2	6	[10]
(Germany) Eva Lys (Hungary) Amarissa Kiara Tóth	6	6
2	(Russia) Polina Kudermetova (United States) Robin Montgomery	1	4

Second round
(Belgium) S Costoulas (Croatia) A Ružić	6	6
(Australia) O Gadecki (Australia) A Stevens	1	3
(United States) S Broadus (United States) E Coleman	6	6
WC	(Australia) J Adams (Australia) TN Smith	4	0
8	(South Korea) D-y Back (Poland) W Baszak	5	1
(Romania) FIA Keita (Israel) S Kimchi	7	6
(Slovenia) Ž Falkner (United Kingdom) M Mutavdzic	3	6	[10]
(Germany) E Lys (Hungary) AK Tóth	6	2	[7]

Quarterfinals
(Belgium) S Costoulas (Croatia) A Ružić	5	0
(United States) S Broadus (United States) E Coleman	7	6
(Romania) FIA Keita (Israel) S Kimchi	3	1
(Slovenia) Ž Falkner (United Kingdom) M Mutavdzic	6	6

Semifinals
(United States) S Broadus (United States) E Coleman	4	6	[8]
(Slovenia) Ž Falkner (United Kingdom) M Mutavdzic	6	4	[10]
