= 2020 Australian Open – Men's doubles =

Men's doubles
- 2020 Australian Open

Final
- Champions: (United States) Rajeev Ram (United Kingdom) Joe Salisbury
- Runners-up: (Australia) Max Purcell (Australia) Luke Saville
- Score: 6–4, 6–2

Details
- Draw: 64
- Seeds: 16

Events
Singles	men	women		boys	girls
Doubles	men	women	mixed	boys	girls
WC Singles	men	women	quad
WC Doubles	men	women	quad
Legends	men	women	mixed
- Australian Open

Rajeev Ram and Joe Salisbury defeated Max Purcell and Luke Saville in the final, 6–4, 6–2 to win the men's doubles tennis title at the 2020 Australian Open.

Pierre-Hugues Herbert and Nicolas Mahut were the defending champions, but were defeated in the first round by Simone Bolelli and Benoît Paire.

Marcelo Arévalo became the first Salvadoran to reach a major quarterfinal.

== Seeds ==
1. (France) Pierre-Hugues Herbert / (France) Nicolas Mahut (first round)
2. (Poland) Łukasz Kubot / (Brazil) Marcelo Melo (second round)
3. (Germany) Kevin Krawietz / (Germany) Andreas Mies (first round)
4. (Croatia) Ivan Dodig / (Slovakia) Filip Polášek (semifinals)
5. (Netherlands) Wesley Koolhof / (Croatia) Nikola Mektić (second round)
6. (Spain) Marcel Granollers / (Argentina) Horacio Zeballos (third round)
7. (Australia) John Peers / (New Zealand) Michael Venus (third round)
8. (Netherlands) Jean-Julien Rojer / (Romania) Horia Tecău (second round)

9. (South Africa) Raven Klaasen / (Austria) Oliver Marach (second round)
10. (Croatia) Mate Pavić / (Brazil) Bruno Soares (third round)
11. (United States) Rajeev Ram / (United Kingdom) Joe Salisbury (champions)
12. (Austria) Jürgen Melzer / (France) Édouard Roger-Vasselin (second round)
13. (United States) Bob Bryan / (United States) Mike Bryan (third round)
14. (United Kingdom) Jamie Murray / (United Kingdom) Neal Skupski (second round)
15. (Argentina) Máximo González / (France) Fabrice Martin (second round)
16. (United States) Austin Krajicek / (Croatia) Franko Škugor (third round)

Click on the seed number of a player to go to their draw section.

== Draw ==
Key

- Q = Qualifier
- WC = Wild card
- LL = Lucky loser
- Alt = Alternate
- ITF = ITF entry
- PR = Protected ranking
- SR = Special ranking
- SE = Special exempt
- JE = Junior exempt
- JR = Junior Accelerator Programme entrant
- CO = College Accelerator Programme entrant
- NG = Next Gen Accelerator Program entrant
- w/o = Walkover
- r = Retired
- d = Defaulted

=== Finals ===
Quarterfinals
(Finland) Henri Kontinen (Germany) Jan-Lennard Struff	4	4
11	(United States) Rajeev Ram (United Kingdom) Joe Salisbury	6	6
(Kazakhstan) Alexander Bublik (Kazakhstan) Mikhail Kukushkin	7^{8}	7
WC	(Australia) James Duckworth (Australia) Marc Polmans	6^{6}	5
(El Salvador) Marcelo Arévalo (United Kingdom) Jonny O'Mara	3	2
4	(Croatia) Ivan Dodig (Slovakia) Filip Polášek	6	6
WC	(Australia) Max Purcell (Australia) Luke Saville	6	6
(Mexico) Santiago González (United Kingdom) Ken Skupski	2	4

Semifinals
11	(United States) Rajeev Ram (United Kingdom) Joe Salisbury	4	6	6
(Kazakhstan) Alexander Bublik (Kazakhstan) Mikhail Kukushkin	6	3	4
4	(Croatia) Ivan Dodig (Slovakia) Filip Polášek	7^{9}	3	4
WC	(Australia) Max Purcell (Australia) Luke Saville	6^{7}	6	6

Final
11	(United States) Rajeev Ram (United Kingdom) Joe Salisbury	6	6
WC	(Australia) Max Purcell (Australia) Luke Saville	4	2

=== Top half ===
==== Section 1 ====
First round
1	(France) P-H Herbert (France) N Mahut	4	6^{3}
(Italy) S Bolelli (France) B Paire	6	7^{7}
(Belgium) S Gillé (Belgium) J Vliegen	6	6
(Spain) P Andújar (Spain) F López	4	1
(Finland) H Kontinen (Germany) J-L Struff	6	6
(Italy) A Seppi (Italy) L Sonego	4	1
(Serbia) N Čačić (Serbia) D Lajović	6^{3}	3
15	(Argentina) M González (France) F Martin	7^{7}	6
11	(United States) R Ram (United Kingdom) J Salisbury	6	7^{7}
Alt	(United Kingdom) D Evans (Australia) J-P Smith	1	6^{3}
(Brazil) M Demoliner (Netherlands) M Middelkoop	6	6^{4}	6^{8}
(United States) T Sandgren (United States) J Withrow	4	7^{7}	7^{10}
(France) J Chardy (Sweden) R Lindstedt	5	7	3
(Uruguay) P Cuevas (Argentina) G Pella	7	5	6
(New Zealand) M Daniell (Austria) P Oswald	4	4
6	(Spain) M Granollers (Argentina) H Zeballos	6	6

Second round
(Italy) S Bolelli (France) B Paire	7^{8}	4	6
(Belgium) S Gillé (Belgium) J Vliegen	6^{6}	6	3
(Finland) H Kontinen (Germany) J-L Struff	4	6	6
15	(Argentina) M González (France) F Martin	6	3	2
11	(United States) R Ram (United Kingdom) J Salisbury	6	6
(United States) T Sandgren (United States) J Withrow	3	3
(Uruguay) P Cuevas (Argentina) G Pella	4	6	5
6	(Spain) M Granollers (Argentina) H Zeballos	6	4	7

Third round
(Italy) S Bolelli (France) B Paire	5	3
(Finland) H Kontinen (Germany) J-L Struff	7	6
11	(United States) R Ram (United Kingdom) J Salisbury	6	7^{13}
6	(Spain) M Granollers (Argentina) H Zeballos	4	6^{11}

Quarterfinals
(Finland) H Kontinen (Germany) J-L Struff	4	4
11	(United States) R Ram (United Kingdom) J Salisbury	6	6

==== Section 2 ====
First round
3	(Germany) K Krawietz (Germany) A Mies	3	6^{7}
(Kazakhstan) A Bublik (Kazakhstan) M Kukushkin	6	7^{9}
WC	(Australia) L Hewitt (Australia) J Thompson	2	3
WC	(South Korea) J-s Nam (South Korea) M-k Song	6	6
(United States) S Johnson (United States) S Querrey	6^{9}	6	6
Alt	(Chinese Taipei) C-p Hsieh (Chinese Taipei) Y-h Lu	7^{11}	4	4
(Poland) H Hurkacz (Canada) V Pospisil	4	4
14	(United Kingdom) J Murray (United Kingdom) N Skupski	6	6
10	(Croatia) M Pavić (Brazil) B Soares	7^{7}	7
(United Kingdom) L Bambridge (Japan) B McLachlan	6^{4}	5
(India) D Sharan (New Zealand) A Sitak	6	7
(Spain) P Carreño Busta (Portugal) J Sousa	4	5
WC	(Australia) J Duckworth (Australia) M Polmans	7^{7}	7
WC	(Australia) A Harris (Australia) C O'Connell	6^{4}	5
(Italy) M Cecchinato (Serbia) L Đere	3	6^{6}
5	(Netherlands) W Koolhof (Croatia) N Mektić	6	7^{8}

Second round
(Kazakhstan) A Bublik (Kazakhstan) M Kukushkin	6^{3}	6	7
WC	(South Korea) J-s Nam (South Korea) M-k Song	7^{7}	4	5
(United States) S Johnson (United States) S Querrey	4	7^{7}	7^{14}
14	(United Kingdom) J Murray (United Kingdom) N Skupski	6	6^{5}	6^{12}
10	(Croatia) M Pavić (Brazil) B Soares	7^{7}	6
(India) D Sharan (New Zealand) A Sitak	6^{2}	3
WC	(Australia) J Duckworth (Australia) M Polmans	7	6
5	(Netherlands) W Koolhof (Croatia) N Mektić	5	3

Third round
(Kazakhstan) A Bublik (Kazakhstan) M Kukushkin	6	6
(United States) S Johnson (United States) S Querrey	4	2
10	(Croatia) M Pavić (Brazil) B Soares	6^{2}	6	6^{9}
WC	(Australia) J Duckworth (Australia) M Polmans	7^{7}	2	7^{11}

Quarterfinals
(Kazakhstan) A Bublik (Kazakhstan) M Kukushkin	7^{8}	7
WC	(Australia) J Duckworth (Australia) M Polmans	6^{6}	5

=== Bottom half ===
==== Section 3 ====
First round
7	(Australia) J Peers (New Zealand) M Venus	7	6
(Denmark) F Nielsen (Germany) T Pütz	5	3
(Slovenia) A Bedene (Uruguay) A Behar	3	2
(Argentina) F Delbonis (Argentina) L Mayer	6	6
(El Salvador) M Arévalo (United Kingdom) J O'Mara	6	6
(Bolivia) H Dellien (Argentina) JI Londero	3	2
(Netherlands) S Arends (Lithuania) R Berankis	2	7^{7}	6^{5}
12	(Austria) J Melzer (France) É Roger-Vasselin	6	6^{2}	7^{10}
13	(United States) B Bryan (United States) M Bryan	6	3	6
(India) R Bopanna (Japan) Y Uchiyama	1	6	3
(United States) T Fritz (United States) T Paul	6	5	3
(Colombia) JS Cabal (Spain) J Munar	3	7	6
(Australia) C Guccione (Australia) M Reid	6	6
(Spain) M López (Spain) A Ramos Viñolas	4	3
WC	(Australia) B Ellis (Australia) A Popyrin	6^{11}	3
4	(Croatia) I Dodig (Slovakia) F Polášek	7^{13}	6

Second round
7	(Australia) J Peers (New Zealand) M Venus	6	1	7^{10}
(Argentina) F Delbonis (Argentina) L Mayer	3	6	6^{7}
(El Salvador) M Arévalo (United Kingdom) J O'Mara	5	7	7^{13}
12	(Austria) J Melzer (France) É Roger-Vasselin	7	5	6^{11}
13	(United States) B Bryan (United States) M Bryan	7^{7}	6
(Colombia) JS Cabal (Spain) J Munar	6^{5}	4
(Australia) C Guccione (Australia) M Reid	3	4
4	(Croatia) I Dodig (Slovakia) F Polášek	6	6

Third round
7	(Australia) J Peers (New Zealand) M Venus	4	6^{7}
(El Salvador) M Arévalo (United Kingdom) J O'Mara	6	7^{9}
13	(United States) B Bryan (United States) M Bryan	3	4
4	(Croatia) I Dodig (Slovakia) F Polášek	6	6

Quarterfinals
(El Salvador) M Arévalo (United Kingdom) J O'Mara	3	2
4	(Croatia) I Dodig (Slovakia) F Polášek	6	6

==== Section 4 ====
First round
8	(Netherlands) J-J Rojer (Romania) H Tecău	6	3	6
(United Kingdom) D Inglot (Pakistan) A-u-H Qureshi	1	6	2
WC	(Australia) M Purcell (Australia) L Saville	6	6
(Russia) A Rublev (Belarus) A Vasilevski	3	2
(Argentina) A Molteni (Monaco) H Nys	4	6	7
WC	(Australia) A Bolt (Australia) M Ebden	6	4	5
(Serbia) M Kecmanović (Norway) C Ruud	2	6	3
9	(South Africa) R Klaasen (Austria) O Marach	6	4	6
16	(United States) A Krajicek (Croatia) F Škugor	6	6^{4}	6
(Czech Republic) R Jebavý (Slovakia) I Zelenay	4	7^{7}	3
(France) G Barrère (France) A Mannarino	6	4	6
(France) U Humbert (United States) F Tiafoe	2	6	2
(South Korea) S-w Kwon (Australia) J Millman	6	4	6^{4}
(Mexico) S González (United Kingdom) K Skupski	4	6	7^{10}
(Argentina) G Durán (Argentina) D Schwartzman	3	2
2	(Poland) Ł Kubot (Brazil) M Melo	6	6

Second round
8	(Netherlands) J-J Rojer (Romania) H Tecău	6^{2}	6	4
WC	(Australia) M Purcell (Australia) L Saville	7^{7}	4	6
(Argentina) A Molteni (Monaco) H Nys	6^{5}	6	6
9	(South Africa) R Klaasen (Austria) O Marach	7^{7}	3	4
16	(United States) A Krajicek (Croatia) F Škugor	7^{7}	6
(France) G Barrère (France) A Mannarino	6^{5}	4
(Mexico) S González (United Kingdom) K Skupski	7	7^{7}
2	(Poland) Ł Kubot (Brazil) M Melo	5	6^{4}

Third round
WC	(Australia) M Purcell (Australia) L Saville	6	7
(Argentina) A Molteni (Monaco) H Nys	3	5
16	(United States) A Krajicek (Croatia) F Škugor	3	4
(Mexico) S González (United Kingdom) K Skupski	6	6

Quarterfinals
WC	(Australia) M Purcell (Australia) L Saville	6	6
(Mexico) S González (United Kingdom) K Skupski	2	4

== Other entry information ==
=== Wild cards ===
- (Australia) Alex Bolt / (Australia) Matthew Ebden
- (Australia) James Duckworth / (Australia) Marc Polmans
- (Australia) Blake Ellis / (Australia) Alexei Popyrin
- (Australia) Andrew Harris / (Australia) Christopher O'Connell
- (Australia) Lleyton Hewitt / (Australia) Jordan Thompson
- (South Korea) Nam Ji-sung / (South Korea) Song Min-kyu
- (Australia) Max Purcell / (Australia) Luke Saville

=== Alternate pairs ===
- (United Kingdom) Dan Evans / (Australia) John-Patrick Smith
- (Chinese Taipei) Hsieh Cheng-peng / (Chinese Taipei) Lu Yen-hsun

=== Withdrawals ===
- (Moldova) Radu Albot / (Ukraine) Denys Molchanov (Albot withdrew due to personal reasons)
- (Hungary) Márton Fucsovics / (United Kingdom) Cameron Norrie (Fucsovics withdrew due to focusing on singles match)
