= 2024 ATP Challenger Tour =

Secondary tennis circuit season

Details
- Duration: 1 January – 1 December
- Edition: 47th (16th under this name)
- Tournaments: 207
- Categories: Challenger 175 (5); Challenger 125 (33); Challenger 100 (41); Challenger 75 (96); Challenger 50 (32)

Achievements (singles)
- Most titles: (Bosnia and Herzegovina) Damir Džumhur (6)
- Most finals: (United States) Nishesh Basavareddy (Bosnia and Herzegovina) Damir Džumhur (Argentina) Camilo Ugo Carabelli (Australia) Adam Walton (6)

The Association of Tennis Professionals (ATP) Challenger Tour in 2024 was the secondary professional tennis circuit organized by the ATP. The 2024 ATP Challenger Tour calendar comprised 207 tournaments with prize money ranging from $41,000 up to $225,500. It was the 47th edition of Challenger tournaments cycle and 16th under the name of Challenger Tour.

== Schedule ==
This was the complete schedule of events on the 2024 calendar, with player progression documented from the quarterfinals stage.

=== January ===
Week of	Tournament	Champions	Runners-up	Semifinalists	Quarterfinalists
January 1	Canberra Tennis International; Canberra, Australia; Hard – Challenger 125 – 32S/24Q/16D; Singles – Doubles	(Germany) Dominik Koepfer; 6–3, 6–2	(Czech Republic) Jakub Menšík	(Canada) Gabriel Diallo (United States) Brandon Nakashima	(Belgium) David Goffin (Italy) Matteo Gigante (Switzerland) Alexander Ritschard (Australia) Tristan Schoolkate
January 1	Canberra Tennis International; Canberra, Australia; Hard – Challenger 125 – 32S/24Q/16D; Singles – Doubles	(Spain) Daniel Rincón (Jordan) Abdullah Shelbayh; 7–6^{(7–4)}, 6–3	(Sweden) André Göransson (France) Albano Olivetti	(Canada) Gabriel Diallo (United States) Brandon Nakashima	(Belgium) David Goffin (Italy) Matteo Gigante (Switzerland) Alexander Ritschard (Australia) Tristan Schoolkate
January 1	Open Nouvelle-Calédonie; Nouméa, New Caledonia; Hard – Challenger 100 – 32S/24Q/16D; Singles – Doubles	(France) Arthur Cazaux; 6–1, 6–1	(France) Enzo Couacaud	(Netherlands) Gijs Brouwer (France) Harold Mayot	(France) Richard Gasquet (France) Hugo Gaston (France) Benoît Paire (Netherlands) Jesper de Jong
January 1	Open Nouvelle-Calédonie; Nouméa, New Caledonia; Hard – Challenger 100 – 32S/24Q/16D; Singles – Doubles	(Northern Mariana Islands) Colin Sinclair (New Zealand) Rubin Statham; 7–5, 6–2	(Japan) Toshihide Matsui (Australia) Calum Puttergill	(Netherlands) Gijs Brouwer (France) Harold Mayot	(France) Richard Gasquet (France) Hugo Gaston (France) Benoît Paire (Netherlands) Jesper de Jong
January 1	Nonthaburi Challenger; Nonthaburi, Thailand; Hard – Challenger 75 – 32S/24Q/16D; Singles – Doubles	(Monaco) Valentin Vacherot; 3–2 ret.	(France) Lucas Pouille	(South Korea) Hong Seong-chan (Chinese Taipei) Hsu Yu-hsiou	(Belgium) Gauthier Onclin; Marat Sharipov (Italy) Francesco Passaro (United States) Brandon Holt
January 1	Nonthaburi Challenger; Nonthaburi, Thailand; Hard – Challenger 75 – 32S/24Q/16D; Singles – Doubles	(United Kingdom) Arthur Fery (United Kingdom) Joshua Paris; 6–2, 7–5	(Thailand) Pruchya Isaro (Thailand) Maximus Jones	(South Korea) Hong Seong-chan (Chinese Taipei) Hsu Yu-hsiou	(Belgium) Gauthier Onclin; Marat Sharipov (Italy) Francesco Passaro (United States) Brandon Holt
January 1	Oeiras Indoors; Oeiras, Portugal; Hard (i) – Challenger 50 – 32S/24Q/16D; Singles – Doubles	(Poland) Maks Kaśnikowski; 7–6^{(7–1)}, 4–6, 6–3	(Portugal) Gastão Elias	Egor Gerasimov (France) Valentin Royer	(United States) Thai-Son Kwiatkowski (Portugal) Jaime Faria (France) Tristan Lamasine (Portugal) João Sousa
January 1	Oeiras Indoors; Oeiras, Portugal; Hard (i) – Challenger 50 – 32S/24Q/16D; Singles – Doubles	(United Kingdom) Jay Clarke (United Kingdom) Marcus Willis; 6–4, 6–7^{(9–11)}, [10–3]	(France) Théo Arribagé (Belgium) Michael Geerts	Egor Gerasimov (France) Valentin Royer	(United States) Thai-Son Kwiatkowski (Portugal) Jaime Faria (France) Tristan Lamasine (Portugal) João Sousa
January 8	Nonthaburi Challenger II; Nonthaburi, Thailand; Hard – Challenger 75 – 32S/24Q/16D; Singles – Doubles	(Monaco) Valentin Vacherot; 7–5, 7–6^{(7–4)}	(France) Manuel Guinard	(United Kingdom) Arthur Fery (Japan) Rio Noguchi	(Austria) Dennis Novak (Japan) Hiroki Moriya (Japan) Yasutaka Uchiyama (United States) Brandon Holt
January 8	Nonthaburi Challenger II; Nonthaburi, Thailand; Hard – Challenger 75 – 32S/24Q/16D; Singles – Doubles	(France) Manuel Guinard (France) Grégoire Jacq; 6–4, 7–6^{(7–5)}	(Philippines) Francis Alcantara (China) Sun Fajing	(United Kingdom) Arthur Fery (Japan) Rio Noguchi	(Austria) Dennis Novak (Japan) Hiroki Moriya (Japan) Yasutaka Uchiyama (United States) Brandon Holt
January 8	Oeiras Indoors II; Oeiras, Portugal; Hard (i) – Challenger 75 – 32S/24Q/16D; Singles – Doubles	(Switzerland) Leandro Riedi; 7–6^{(8–6)}, 6–2	(United States) Martin Damm	(Romania) Marius Copil (Portugal) Gastão Elias	(Spain) Alejandro Moro Cañas (Portugal) João Sousa (Denmark) Elmer Møller (France) Valentin Royer
January 8	Oeiras Indoors II; Oeiras, Portugal; Hard (i) – Challenger 75 – 32S/24Q/16D; Singles – Doubles	(Poland) Karol Drzewiecki (Poland) Piotr Matuszewski; 6–3, 6–4	(India) Arjun Kadhe (United Kingdom) Marcus Willis	(Romania) Marius Copil (Portugal) Gastão Elias	(Spain) Alejandro Moro Cañas (Portugal) João Sousa (Denmark) Elmer Møller (France) Valentin Royer
January 8	Challenger AAT; Buenos Aires, Argentina; Clay – Challenger 50 – 32S/24Q/16D; Singles – Doubles	(Peru) Gonzalo Bueno; 6–4, 2–6, 7–6^{(7–4)}	(Kazakhstan) Dmitry Popko	(Brazil) João Fonseca (Brazil) João Lucas Reis da Silva	(Italy) Gianluca Mager (United States) Tristan Boyer (Netherlands) Max Houkes (Brazil) Mateus Alves
January 8	Challenger AAT; Buenos Aires, Argentina; Clay – Challenger 50 – 32S/24Q/16D; Singles – Doubles	(Peru) Arklon Huertas del Pino (Peru) Conner Huertas del Pino; 6–3, 3–6, [10–6]	(Netherlands) Max Houkes (Austria) Lukas Neumayer	(Brazil) João Fonseca (Brazil) João Lucas Reis da Silva	(Italy) Gianluca Mager (United States) Tristan Boyer (Netherlands) Max Houkes (Brazil) Mateus Alves
January 15	Tenerife Challenger; Tenerife, Spain; Hard – Challenger 100 – 32S/24Q/16D; Singles – Doubles	(United States) Brandon Nakashima; 6–3, 6–4	(Spain) Pedro Martínez	(Kazakhstan) Denis Yevseyev (Spain) Javier Barranco Cosano	(Italy) Samuel Vincent Ruggeri (Italy) Francesco Maestrelli (Kazakhstan) Mikhail Kukushkin (Spain) Pablo Llamas Ruiz
January 15	Tenerife Challenger; Tenerife, Spain; Hard – Challenger 100 – 32S/24Q/16D; Singles – Doubles	(United States) Vasil Kirkov (Venezuela) Luis David Martínez; 3–6, 6–4, [10–3]	(Poland) Karol Drzewiecki (Poland) Piotr Matuszewski	(Kazakhstan) Denis Yevseyev (Spain) Javier Barranco Cosano	(Italy) Samuel Vincent Ruggeri (Italy) Francesco Maestrelli (Kazakhstan) Mikhail Kukushkin (Spain) Pablo Llamas Ruiz
January 15	Nonthaburi Challenger III; Nonthaburi, Thailand; Hard – Challenger 75 – 32S/24Q/16D; Singles – Doubles	(Italy) Matteo Gigante; 6–4, 6–1	(South Korea) Hong Seong-chan	(Chinese Taipei) Jason Jung (Italy) Giovanni Fonio	(Croatia) Duje Ajduković (United Kingdom) Ryan Peniston (United States) Nicolas Moreno de Alboran (Austria) Dennis Novak
January 15	Nonthaburi Challenger III; Nonthaburi, Thailand; Hard – Challenger 75 – 32S/24Q/16D; Singles – Doubles	(United Kingdom) Luke Johnson (Tunisia) Skander Mansouri; 7–5, 6–4	(India) Rithvik Choudary Bollipalli (India) Niki Kaliyanda Poonacha	(Chinese Taipei) Jason Jung (Italy) Giovanni Fonio	(Croatia) Duje Ajduković (United Kingdom) Ryan Peniston (United States) Nicolas Moreno de Alboran (Austria) Dennis Novak
January 15	Southern California Open; Indian Wells, United States; Hard – Challenger 50 – 32S/24Q/16D; Singles – Doubles	(United States) Mitchell Krueger; 4–6, 6–3, 6–4	(United States) Brandon Holt	(United Kingdom) Paul Jubb (United States) Thai-Son Kwiatkowski	(United States) Omni Kumar (United States) Learner Tien (Israel) Daniel Cukierman (Argentina) Marco Trungelliti
January 15	Southern California Open; Indian Wells, United States; Hard – Challenger 50 – 32S/24Q/16D; Singles – Doubles	(United States) Ryan Seggerman (United States) Patrik Trhac; 6–2, 7–6^{(7–3)}	(United States) Thai-Son Kwiatkowski (United States) Alex Lawson	(United Kingdom) Paul Jubb (United States) Thai-Son Kwiatkowski	(United States) Omni Kumar (United States) Learner Tien (Israel) Daniel Cukierman (Argentina) Marco Trungelliti
January 15	Challenger AAT II; Buenos Aires, Argentina; Clay – Challenger 50 – 32S/24Q/16D; Singles – Doubles	(Argentina) Facundo Bagnis; 7–5, 1–6, 7–5	(Argentina) Mariano Navone	(Italy) Edoardo Lavagno (Kazakhstan) Dmitry Popko	(Bolivia) Murkel Dellien (Argentina) Santiago Rodríguez Taverna (Argentina) Andrea Collarini (Canada) Liam Draxl
January 15	Challenger AAT II; Buenos Aires, Argentina; Clay – Challenger 50 – 32S/24Q/16D; Singles – Doubles	(Brazil) João Fonseca (Brazil) Pedro Sakamoto; 6–2, 6–2	(Germany) Jakob Schnaitter (Germany) Mark Wallner	(Italy) Edoardo Lavagno (Kazakhstan) Dmitry Popko	(Bolivia) Murkel Dellien (Argentina) Santiago Rodríguez Taverna (Argentina) Andrea Collarini (Canada) Liam Draxl
January 22	BW Open; Ottignies-Louvain-la-Neuve, Belgium; Hard (i) – Challenger 125 – 32S/24Q/16D; Singles – Doubles	(Switzerland) Leandro Riedi; 7–5, 6–2	(Croatia) Borna Ćorić	(Bosnia and Herzegovina) Damir Džumhur (United States) Brandon Nakashima	(Jordan) Abdullah Shelbayh (Germany) Henri Squire (Switzerland) Marc-Andrea Hüsler (United Kingdom) Jan Choinski
January 22	BW Open; Ottignies-Louvain-la-Neuve, Belgium; Hard (i) – Challenger 125 – 32S/24Q/16D; Singles – Doubles	(United Kingdom) Luke Johnson (Tunisia) Skander Mansouri; 7–5, 6–3	(Netherlands) Sander Arends (Netherlands) Sem Verbeek	(Bosnia and Herzegovina) Damir Džumhur (United States) Brandon Nakashima	(Jordan) Abdullah Shelbayh (Germany) Henri Squire (Switzerland) Marc-Andrea Hüsler (United Kingdom) Jan Choinski
January 22	Open Quimper Bretagne; Quimper, France; Hard (i) – Challenger 125 – 32S/24Q/16D; Singles – Doubles	(France) Pierre-Hugues Herbert; 6–3, 6–2	(Croatia) Duje Ajduković	(France) Harold Mayot (France) Matteo Martineau	(Finland) Otto Virtanen (United States) Maxime Cressy (France) Mathias Bourgue (France) Arthur Rinderknech
January 22	Open Quimper Bretagne; Quimper, France; Hard (i) – Challenger 125 – 32S/24Q/16D; Singles – Doubles	(France) Manuel Guinard (France) Arthur Rinderknech; 7–6^{(7–4)}, 6–3	(India) Anirudh Chandrasekar (India) Vijay Sundar Prashanth	(France) Harold Mayot (France) Matteo Martineau	(Finland) Otto Virtanen (United States) Maxime Cressy (France) Mathias Bourgue (France) Arthur Rinderknech
January 22	Punta Open; Punta del Este, Uruguay; Clay – Challenger 75 – 32S/24Q/16D; Singles – Doubles	(Italy) Gianluca Mager; 6–7^{(5–7)}, 6–2, 6–0	(Argentina) Thiago Agustín Tirante	(Argentina) Román Andrés Burruchaga (Italy) Marco Cecchinato	(Brazil) Thiago Monteiro (Bolivia) Murkel Dellien (Argentina) Juan Manuel Cerúndolo (Moldova) Radu Albot
January 22	Punta Open; Punta del Este, Uruguay; Clay – Challenger 75 – 32S/24Q/16D; Singles – Doubles	(Bolivia) Murkel Dellien (Argentina) Federico Agustín Gómez; 6–3, 6–2	(Argentina) Guido Andreozzi (Argentina) Guillermo Durán	(Argentina) Román Andrés Burruchaga (Italy) Marco Cecchinato	(Brazil) Thiago Monteiro (Bolivia) Murkel Dellien (Argentina) Juan Manuel Cerúndolo (Moldova) Radu Albot
January 22	Southern California Open II; Indian Wells, United States; Hard – Challenger 50 – 32S/24Q/16D; Singles – Doubles	(Jamaica) Blaise Bicknell; 6–3, 6–2	(United States) Zachary Svajda	(Germany) Sebastian Fanselow (United States) Andre Ilagan	(Slovenia) Bor Artnak (United States) Learner Tien (United States) Brandon Holt (United States) Thai-Son Kwiatkowski
January 22	Southern California Open II; Indian Wells, United States; Hard – Challenger 50 – 32S/24Q/16D; Singles – Doubles	(United States) Ryan Seggerman (United States) Patrik Trhac; 6–4, 3–6, [10–3]	(Australia) Thomas Fancutt (New Zealand) Ajeet Rai	(Germany) Sebastian Fanselow (United States) Andre Ilagan	(Slovenia) Bor Artnak (United States) Learner Tien (United States) Brandon Holt (United States) Thai-Son Kwiatkowski
January 29	Koblenz Open; Koblenz, Germany; Hard (i) – Challenger 100 – 32S/24Q/16D; Singles – Doubles	(Austria) Jurij Rodionov; 6–7^{(7–9)}, 6–1, 6–2	(United States) Brandon Nakashima	(Italy) Stefano Travaglia (Syria) Hazem Naw	(Germany) Rudolf Molleker (United States) Martin Damm (Czech Republic) Zdeněk Kolář (Germany) Max Hans Rehberg
January 29	Koblenz Open; Koblenz, Germany; Hard (i) – Challenger 100 – 32S/24Q/16D; Singles – Doubles	(Netherlands) Sander Arends (Netherlands) Sem Verbeek; 6–4, 6–2	(Germany) Jakob Schnaitter (Germany) Mark Wallner	(Italy) Stefano Travaglia (Syria) Hazem Naw	(Germany) Rudolf Molleker (United States) Martin Damm (Czech Republic) Zdeněk Kolář (Germany) Max Hans Rehberg
January 29	Burnie International; Burnie, Australia; Hard – Challenger 75 – 32S/24Q/16D; Singles – Doubles	(Australia) Omar Jasika; 6–2, 6–7^{(2–7)}, 6–3	(Australia) Alex Bolt	(Japan) Shintaro Imai (Japan) Yasutaka Uchiyama	(Australia) Dane Sweeny (Australia) Luke Saville (Japan) Hiroki Moriya (Australia) Marc Polmans
January 29	Burnie International; Burnie, Australia; Hard – Challenger 75 – 32S/24Q/16D; Singles – Doubles	(Australia) Alex Bolt (Australia) Luke Saville; 5–7, 6–3, [12–10]	(Australia) Tristan Schoolkate (Australia) Adam Walton	(Japan) Shintaro Imai (Japan) Yasutaka Uchiyama	(Australia) Dane Sweeny (Australia) Luke Saville (Japan) Hiroki Moriya (Australia) Marc Polmans
January 29	Cleveland Open; Cleveland, United States; Hard (i) – Challenger 75 – 32S/24Q/16D; Singles – Doubles	(United States) Patrick Kypson; 4–6, 6–3, 6–2	(United States) Ethan Quinn	(Australia) James Duckworth (United States) Denis Kudla	(United States) Quinn Vandecasteele (United States) Emilio Nava (United States) Tennys Sandgren (United States) Thai-Son Kwiatkowski
January 29	Cleveland Open; Cleveland, United States; Hard (i) – Challenger 75 – 32S/24Q/16D; Singles – Doubles	(United States) George Goldhoff (Japan) James Trotter; 6–7^{(0–7)}, 6–3, [10–8]	(United States) William Blumberg (United States) Alex Lawson	(Australia) James Duckworth (United States) Denis Kudla	(United States) Quinn Vandecasteele (United States) Emilio Nava (United States) Tennys Sandgren (United States) Thai-Son Kwiatkowski
January 29	Brasil Tennis Challenger; Piracicaba, Brazil; Clay – Challenger 75 – 32S/24Q/16D; Singles – Doubles	(Argentina) Camilo Ugo Carabelli; 7–5, 6–4	(Argentina) Federico Coria	(Brazil) Matheus Pucinelli de Almeida (United Kingdom) Felix Gill	(Italy) Gianluca Mager (Italy) Alexander Weis; Ivan Gakhov (Switzerland) Kilian Feldbausch
January 29	Brasil Tennis Challenger; Piracicaba, Brazil; Clay – Challenger 75 – 32S/24Q/16D; Singles – Doubles	(Argentina) Guido Andreozzi (Argentina) Guillermo Durán; 6–2, 7–6^{(7–5)}	(Brazil) Daniel Dutra da Silva (Brazil) Pedro Sakamoto	(Brazil) Matheus Pucinelli de Almeida (United Kingdom) Felix Gill	(Italy) Gianluca Mager (Italy) Alexander Weis; Ivan Gakhov (Switzerland) Kilian Feldbausch

=== February ===
Week of	Tournament	Champions	Runners-up	Semifinalists	Quarterfinalists
February 5	Chennai Open Challenger; Chennai, India; Hard – Challenger 100 – 32S/24Q/16D; Singles – Doubles	(India) Sumit Nagal; 6–1, 6–4	(Italy) Luca Nardi	(Chinese Taipei) Tseng Chun-hsin (Czech Republic) Dalibor Svrčina	(Italy) Stefano Napolitano (Italy) Enrico Dalla Valle (India) Mukund Sasikumar (Czech Republic) Dominik Palán
February 5	Chennai Open Challenger; Chennai, India; Hard – Challenger 100 – 32S/24Q/16D; Singles – Doubles	(India) Saketh Myneni (India) Ramkumar Ramanathan; 3–6, 6–3, [10–5]	(India) Rithvik Choudary Bollipalli (India) Niki Kaliyanda Poonacha	(Chinese Taipei) Tseng Chun-hsin (Czech Republic) Dalibor Svrčina	(Italy) Stefano Napolitano (Italy) Enrico Dalla Valle (India) Mukund Sasikumar (Czech Republic) Dominik Palán
February 5	Burnie International II; Burnie, Australia; Hard – Challenger 75 – 32S/24Q/16D; Singles – Doubles	(Australia) Adam Walton; 6–2, 7–6^{(7–4)}	(Australia) Dane Sweeny	(Australia) Tristan Schoolkate (Japan) Yasutaka Uchiyama	(Australia) Philip Sekulic (Australia) Li Tu (Australia) James McCabe (United States) Christian Langmo
February 5	Burnie International II; Burnie, Australia; Hard – Challenger 75 – 32S/24Q/16D; Singles – Doubles	(Zimbabwe) Benjamin Lock (Japan) Yuta Shimizu; 6–4, 7–6^{(7–4)}	(Australia) Blake Bayldon (Australia) Kody Pearson	(Australia) Tristan Schoolkate (Japan) Yasutaka Uchiyama	(Australia) Philip Sekulic (Australia) Li Tu (Australia) James McCabe (United States) Christian Langmo
February 5	Lexus Nottingham Challenger; Nottingham, United Kingdom; Hard (i) – Challenger 75 – 32S/24Q/16D; Singles – Doubles	(France) Giovanni Mpetshi Perricard; 7–6^{(7–2)}, 6–4	(France) Matteo Martineau	(Kazakhstan) Mikhail Kukushkin (Belgium) Alexander Blockx	(Bulgaria) Dimitar Kuzmanov (Czech Republic) Zdeněk Kolář (Jordan) Abdullah Shelbayh (United Kingdom) Hamish Stewart
February 5	Lexus Nottingham Challenger; Nottingham, United Kingdom; Hard (i) – Challenger 75 – 32S/24Q/16D; Singles – Doubles	(Czech Republic) Petr Nouza (Czech Republic) Patrik Rikl; 6–3, 7–6^{(7–3)}	(France) Antoine Escoffier (United Kingdom) Joshua Paris	(Kazakhstan) Mikhail Kukushkin (Belgium) Alexander Blockx	(Bulgaria) Dimitar Kuzmanov (Czech Republic) Zdeněk Kolář (Jordan) Abdullah Shelbayh (United Kingdom) Hamish Stewart
February 12	Bahrain Ministry of Interior Tennis Challenger; Manama, Bahrain; Hard – Challenger 125 – 32S/24Q/16D; Singles – Doubles	(Kazakhstan) Mikhail Kukushkin; 7–6^{(7–5)}, 6–4	(France) Richard Gasquet	(Bosnia and Herzegovina) Damir Džumhur (Czech Republic) Jakub Menšík	(United Kingdom) Billy Harris (Spain) Daniel Rincón (Argentina) Marco Trungelliti (Jordan) Abdullah Shelbayh
February 12	Bahrain Ministry of Interior Tennis Challenger; Manama, Bahrain; Hard – Challenger 125 – 32S/24Q/16D; Singles – Doubles	(Spain) Sergio Martos Gornés (Greece) Petros Tsitsipas; 3–6, 6–3, [10–8]	(United States) Vasil Kirkov (Finland) Patrik Niklas-Salminen	(Bosnia and Herzegovina) Damir Džumhur (Czech Republic) Jakub Menšík	(United Kingdom) Billy Harris (Spain) Daniel Rincón (Argentina) Marco Trungelliti (Jordan) Abdullah Shelbayh
February 12	Bengaluru Open; Bangalore, India; Hard – Challenger 100 – 32S/24Q/16D; Singles – Doubles	(Italy) Stefano Napolitano; 4–6, 6–3, 6–3	(South Korea) Hong Seong-chan	(Spain) Oriol Roca Batalla (India) Sumit Nagal	(India) Ramkumar Ramanathan (Poland) Maks Kaśnikowski (Tunisia) Moez Echargui (Australia) Adam Walton
February 12	Bengaluru Open; Bangalore, India; Hard – Challenger 100 – 32S/24Q/16D; Singles – Doubles	(India) Saketh Myneni (India) Ramkumar Ramanathan; 6–3, 6–4	(France) Constantin Bittoun Kouzmine (France) Maxime Janvier	(Spain) Oriol Roca Batalla (India) Sumit Nagal	(India) Ramkumar Ramanathan (Poland) Maks Kaśnikowski (Tunisia) Moez Echargui (Australia) Adam Walton
February 12	Challenger La Manche; Cherbourg, France; Hard (i) – Challenger 75 – 32S/24Q/16D; Singles – Doubles	(Hungary) Zsombor Piros; 6–3, 6–4	(France) Matteo Martineau	(Belgium) Michael Geerts (France) Quentin Halys	(Estonia) Mark Lajal; Alibek Kachmazov; Nikolay Vylegzhanin (France) Titouan Droguet
February 12	Challenger La Manche; Cherbourg, France; Hard (i) – Challenger 75 – 32S/24Q/16D; Singles – Doubles	(United States) George Goldhoff (Japan) James Trotter; 6–2, 6–3	(Netherlands) Ryan Nijboer (Germany) Niklas Schell	(Belgium) Michael Geerts (France) Quentin Halys	(Estonia) Mark Lajal; Alibek Kachmazov; Nikolay Vylegzhanin (France) Titouan Droguet
February 12	Glasgow Challenger; Glasgow, United Kingdom; Hard (i) – Challenger 50 – 32S/24Q/16D; Singles – Doubles	(France) Clément Chidekh; 0–6, 6–4, 6–1	(United Kingdom) Paul Jubb	(France) Manuel Guinard (Germany) Elmar Ejupovic	(United Kingdom) Hamish Stewart (Germany) Nicola Kuhn (United Kingdom) Henry Searle (United Kingdom) Stuart Parker
February 12	Glasgow Challenger; Glasgow, United Kingdom; Hard (i) – Challenger 50 – 32S/24Q/16D; Singles – Doubles	(United Kingdom) Scott Duncan (United Kingdom) Marcus Willis; 6–3, 6–2	(United Kingdom) Kyle Edmund (United Kingdom) Henry Searle	(France) Manuel Guinard (Germany) Elmar Ejupovic	(United Kingdom) Hamish Stewart (Germany) Nicola Kuhn (United Kingdom) Henry Searle (United Kingdom) Stuart Parker
February 19	Teréga Open Pau–Pyrénées; Pau, France; Hard (i) – Challenger 125 – 32S/24Q/16D; Singles – Doubles	(Finland) Otto Virtanen; 7–5, 7–5	(Switzerland) Leandro Riedi	(France) Clément Chidekh (United States) Brandon Nakashima	(Croatia) Dino Prižmić (France) Titouan Droguet (Italy) Mattia Bellucci (France) Lucas Pouille
February 19	Teréga Open Pau–Pyrénées; Pau, France; Hard (i) – Challenger 125 – 32S/24Q/16D; Singles – Doubles	(United States) Christian Harrison (United States) Brandon Nakashima; 7–6^{(7–5)}, 6–4	(Monaco) Romain Arneodo (Austria) Sam Weissborn	(France) Clément Chidekh (United States) Brandon Nakashima	(Croatia) Dino Prižmić (France) Titouan Droguet (Italy) Mattia Bellucci (France) Lucas Pouille
February 19	Pune Challenger; Pune, India; Hard – Challenger 100 – 32S/24Q/16D; Singles – Doubles	(Monaco) Valentin Vacherot; 3–6, 7–6^{(7–5)}, 7–6^{(7–5)}	(Australia) Adam Walton	(Australia) Dane Sweeny (Croatia) Duje Ajduković	(India) Niki Kaliyanda Poonacha (France) Enzo Couacaud (India) Mukund Sasikumar; Alexey Zakharov
February 19	Pune Challenger; Pune, India; Hard – Challenger 100 – 32S/24Q/16D; Singles – Doubles	(Australia) Tristan Schoolkate (Australia) Adam Walton; 7–6^{(7–4)}, 7–5	(France) Dan Added (South Korea) Chung Yun-seong	(Australia) Dane Sweeny (Croatia) Duje Ajduković	(India) Niki Kaliyanda Poonacha (France) Enzo Couacaud (India) Mukund Sasikumar; Alexey Zakharov
February 19	Tenerife Challenger II; Tenerife, Spain; Hard – Challenger 75 – 32S/24Q/16D; Singles – Doubles	(Italy) Matteo Gigante; 6–2, 6–4	(Italy) Stefano Travaglia	(France) Jules Marie (Italy) Francesco Maestrelli	(Portugal) Henrique Rocha (Slovakia) Jozef Kovalík (United States) Martin Damm (Italy) Salvatore Caruso
February 19	Tenerife Challenger II; Tenerife, Spain; Hard – Challenger 75 – 32S/24Q/16D; Singles – Doubles	(Czech Republic) Petr Nouza (Czech Republic) Patrik Rikl; 6–4, 4–6, [11–9]	(Netherlands) Sander Arends (Netherlands) Sem Verbeek	(France) Jules Marie (Italy) Francesco Maestrelli	(Portugal) Henrique Rocha (Slovakia) Jozef Kovalík (United States) Martin Damm (Italy) Salvatore Caruso
February 26	Play In Challenger; Lille, France; Hard (i) – Challenger 100 – 32S/24Q/16D; Singles – Doubles	(France) Arthur Rinderknech; 6–4, 3–6, 7–6^{(10–8)}	(Belgium) Joris De Loore	(Finland) Otto Virtanen (France) Pierre-Hugues Herbert	(United Kingdom) Billy Harris (France) Grégoire Barrère (Moldova) Radu Albot (France) Giovanni Mpetshi Perricard
February 26	Play In Challenger; Lille, France; Hard (i) – Challenger 100 – 32S/24Q/16D; Singles – Doubles	(United States) Christian Harrison (United Kingdom) Marcus Willis; 7–6^{(8–6)}, 6–3	(France) Titouan Droguet (France) Giovanni Mpetshi Perricard	(Finland) Otto Virtanen (France) Pierre-Hugues Herbert	(United Kingdom) Billy Harris (France) Grégoire Barrère (Moldova) Radu Albot (France) Giovanni Mpetshi Perricard
February 26	Delhi Open; New Delhi, India; Hard – Challenger 75 – 32S/24Q/16D; Singles – Doubles	(France) Geoffrey Blancaneaux; 6–4, 6–2	(Hong Kong) Coleman Wong	(Japan) Yuta Shimizu (United States) Tristan Boyer	(Italy) Enrico Dalla Valle (Australia) Tristan Schoolkate (Czech Republic) Dalibor Svrčina (Australia) Philip Sekulic
February 26	Delhi Open; New Delhi, India; Hard – Challenger 75 – 32S/24Q/16D; Singles – Doubles	(Poland) Piotr Matuszewski (Australia) Matthew Romios; 6–4, 6–4	(Germany) Jakob Schnaitter (Germany) Mark Wallner	(Japan) Yuta Shimizu (United States) Tristan Boyer	(Italy) Enrico Dalla Valle (Australia) Tristan Schoolkate (Czech Republic) Dalibor Svrčina (Australia) Philip Sekulic
February 26	Tenerife Challenger III; Tenerife, Spain; Hard – Challenger 75 – 32S/24Q/16D; Singles – Doubles	(Kazakhstan) Mikhail Kukushkin; 6–2, 2–0 ret.	(Italy) Matteo Gigante	(Spain) Martín Landaluce (China) Bu Yunchaokete	(Spain) Daniel Mérida (Austria) Lukas Neumayer (United States) Martin Damm (Spain) Alejandro Moro Cañas
February 26	Tenerife Challenger III; Tenerife, Spain; Hard – Challenger 75 – 32S/24Q/16D; Singles – Doubles	(Netherlands) Sander Arends (Netherlands) Sem Verbeek; 6–4, 6–4	(Italy) Marco Bortolotti (Spain) Sergio Martos Gornés	(Spain) Martín Landaluce (China) Bu Yunchaokete	(Spain) Daniel Mérida (Austria) Lukas Neumayer (United States) Martin Damm (Spain) Alejandro Moro Cañas
February 26	Rwanda Challenger; Kigali, Rwanda; Clay – Challenger 50 – 32S/24Q/16D; Singles – Doubles	(Poland) Kamil Majchrzak; 6–4, 6–4	(Argentina) Marco Trungelliti	(Netherlands) Max Houkes (United States) Stefan Kozlov	(France) Corentin Denolly (France) Calvin Hemery (Romania) Nicholas David Ionel (Israel) Yshai Oliel
February 26	Rwanda Challenger; Kigali, Rwanda; Clay – Challenger 50 – 32S/24Q/16D; Singles – Doubles	(Netherlands) Max Houkes (France) Clément Tabur; 6–3, 7–6^{(7–4)}	(Thailand) Pruchya Isaro (Indonesia) Christopher Rungkat	(Netherlands) Max Houkes (United States) Stefan Kozlov	(France) Corentin Denolly (France) Calvin Hemery (Romania) Nicholas David Ionel (Israel) Yshai Oliel

=== March ===
Week of	Tournament	Champions	Runners-up	Semifinalists	Quarterfinalists
March 4	Challenger Città di Lugano; Lugano, Switzerland; Hard (i) – Challenger 75 – 32S/24Q/16D; Singles – Doubles	(Finland) Otto Virtanen; 6–7^{(4–7)}, 6–4, 7–6^{(7–3)}	(Germany) Daniel Masur	(Belgium) Zizou Bergs (Germany) Rudolf Molleker	(Kazakhstan) Mikhail Kukushkin (Moldova) Radu Albot (Netherlands) Gijs Brouwer (France) Pierre-Hugues Herbert
March 4	Challenger Città di Lugano; Lugano, Switzerland; Hard (i) – Challenger 75 – 32S/24Q/16D; Singles – Doubles	(Netherlands) Sander Arends (Netherlands) Sem Verbeek; 6–7^{(9–11)}, 7–6^{(7–1)}, [10–8]	(Germany) Constantin Frantzen (Germany) Hendrik Jebens	(Belgium) Zizou Bergs (Germany) Rudolf Molleker	(Kazakhstan) Mikhail Kukushkin (Moldova) Radu Albot (Netherlands) Gijs Brouwer (France) Pierre-Hugues Herbert
March 4	Santa Cruz Challenger; Santa Cruz de la Sierra, Bolivia; Clay – Challenger 75 – 32S/24Q/16D; Singles – Doubles	(Argentina) Camilo Ugo Carabelli; 6–4, 6–2	(Bolivia) Murkel Dellien	(Brazil) Thiago Monteiro (Argentina) Renzo Olivo	(Brazil) Pedro Sakamoto (Portugal) Gonçalo Oliveira (Argentina) Román Andrés Burruchaga (Argentina) Juan Manuel Cerúndolo
March 4	Santa Cruz Challenger; Santa Cruz de la Sierra, Bolivia; Clay – Challenger 75 – 32S/24Q/16D; Singles – Doubles	(Argentina) Andrea Collarini (Argentina) Renzo Olivo; 6–4, 6–1	(Bolivia) Hugo Dellien (Bolivia) Murkel Dellien	(Brazil) Thiago Monteiro (Argentina) Renzo Olivo	(Brazil) Pedro Sakamoto (Portugal) Gonçalo Oliveira (Argentina) Román Andrés Burruchaga (Argentina) Juan Manuel Cerúndolo
March 4	Rwanda Challenger II; Kigali, Rwanda; Clay – Challenger 50 – 32S/24Q/16D; Singles – Doubles	(Argentina) Marco Trungelliti; 6–4, 6–2	(France) Clément Tabur	(Poland) Kamil Majchrzak (Switzerland) Damien Wenger	(United States) Stefan Kozlov (Egypt) Mohamed Safwat (France) Calvin Hemery (Israel) Daniel Cukierman
March 4	Rwanda Challenger II; Kigali, Rwanda; Clay – Challenger 50 – 32S/24Q/16D; Singles – Doubles	(Australia) Thomas Fancutt (United States) Hunter Reese; 6–1, 7–5	(India) S D Prajwal Dev (Austria) David Pichler	(Poland) Kamil Majchrzak (Switzerland) Damien Wenger	(United States) Stefan Kozlov (Egypt) Mohamed Safwat (France) Calvin Hemery (Israel) Daniel Cukierman
March 11	Arizona Tennis Classic; Phoenix, United States; Hard – Challenger 175 – 32S/24Q/16D; Singles – Doubles	(Portugal) Nuno Borges; 7–5, 7–6^{(7–4)}	(Italy) Matteo Berrettini	(France) Luca Van Assche (Australia) Aleksandar Vukic	(Australia) Thanasi Kokkinakis (United States) Denis Kudla (France) Quentin Halys (France) Térence Atmane
March 11	Arizona Tennis Classic; Phoenix, United States; Hard – Challenger 175 – 32S/24Q/16D; Singles – Doubles	(France) Sadio Doumbia (France) Fabien Reboul; 6–3, 6–2	(Australia) Rinky Hijikata (United Kingdom) Henry Patten	(France) Luca Van Assche (Australia) Aleksandar Vukic	(Australia) Thanasi Kokkinakis (United States) Denis Kudla (France) Quentin Halys (France) Térence Atmane
March 11	Challenger de Santiago; Santiago, Chile; Clay – Challenger 75 – 32S/24Q/16D; Singles – Doubles	(Peru) Juan Pablo Varillas; 6–3, 6–2	(Argentina) Facundo Bagnis	(Brazil) Gustavo Heide (Canada) Liam Draxl	(Italy) Gianluca Mager (Bolivia) Hugo Dellien (Argentina) Camilo Ugo Carabelli (Italy) Francesco Passaro
March 11	Challenger de Santiago; Santiago, Chile; Clay – Challenger 75 – 32S/24Q/16D; Singles – Doubles	(Brazil) Fernando Romboli (Brazil) Marcelo Zormann; 7–6^{(7–5)}, 6–4	(Bolivia) Boris Arias (Bolivia) Federico Zeballos	(Brazil) Gustavo Heide (Canada) Liam Draxl	(Italy) Gianluca Mager (Bolivia) Hugo Dellien (Argentina) Camilo Ugo Carabelli (Italy) Francesco Passaro
March 11	Kiskút Open; Székesfehérvár, Hungary; Clay (i) – Challenger 75 – 32S/24Q/16D; Singles – Doubles	(Chinese Taipei) Tseng Chun-hsin; 4–1 ret.	(France) Titouan Droguet	(Italy) Francesco Maestrelli (Italy) Franco Agamenone	(Poland) Daniel Michalski (France) Matteo Martineau (Czech Republic) Zdeněk Kolář (Hungary) Zsombor Piros
March 11	Kiskút Open; Székesfehérvár, Hungary; Clay (i) – Challenger 75 – 32S/24Q/16D; Singles – Doubles	(France) Titouan Droguet (France) Matteo Martineau; 4–6, 7–5, [10–8]	(Sweden) André Göransson (Ukraine) Denys Molchanov	(Italy) Francesco Maestrelli (Italy) Franco Agamenone	(Poland) Daniel Michalski (France) Matteo Martineau (Czech Republic) Zdeněk Kolář (Hungary) Zsombor Piros
March 11	Tennis Challenger Hamburg; Hamburg, Germany; Hard (i) – Challenger 50 – 32S/24Q/16D; Singles – Doubles	(Germany) Henri Squire; 6–4, 6–2	(France) Clément Chidekh	(Belgium) Alexander Blockx (Japan) Yuta Shimizu	(Germany) Rudolf Molleker (Switzerland) Alexander Ritschard (Republic of Ireland) Michael Agwi (Italy) Mattia Bellucci
March 11	Tennis Challenger Hamburg; Hamburg, Germany; Hard (i) – Challenger 50 – 32S/24Q/16D; Singles – Doubles	(Italy) Mattia Bellucci (Switzerland) Rémy Bertola; 6–4, 7–5	(Poland) Karol Drzewiecki (Finland) Patrik Niklas-Salminen	(Belgium) Alexander Blockx (Japan) Yuta Shimizu	(Germany) Rudolf Molleker (Switzerland) Alexander Ritschard (Republic of Ireland) Michael Agwi (Italy) Mattia Bellucci
March 18	Paraguay Open; Asunción, Paraguay; Clay – Challenger 75 – 32S/24Q/16D; Singles – Doubles	(Brazil) Gustavo Heide; 7–5, 6–7^{(6–8)}, 6–1	(Brazil) João Fonseca	(Peru) Juan Pablo Varillas (Argentina) Román Andrés Burruchaga	(Argentina) Federico Agustín Gómez (Italy) Alexander Weis (Brazil) Orlando Luz (Italy) Gianluca Mager
March 18	Paraguay Open; Asunción, Paraguay; Clay – Challenger 75 – 32S/24Q/16D; Singles – Doubles	(Bolivia) Boris Arias (Bolivia) Federico Zeballos; 6–2, 6–2	(Peru) Gonzalo Bueno (Ecuador) Álvaro Guillén Meza	(Peru) Juan Pablo Varillas (Argentina) Román Andrés Burruchaga	(Argentina) Federico Agustín Gómez (Italy) Alexander Weis (Brazil) Orlando Luz (Italy) Gianluca Mager
March 18	Murcia Open; Murcia, Spain; Clay – Challenger 75 – 32S/24Q/16D; Singles – Doubles	(Portugal) Henrique Rocha; 3–6, 7–6^{(7–0)}, 7–5	(Georgia (country)) Nikoloz Basilashvili	(Spain) Albert Ramos Viñolas (Spain) Pablo Llamas Ruiz	(China) Bu Yunchaokete (Argentina) Marco Trungelliti (Moldova) Radu Albot (France) Richard Gasquet
March 18	Murcia Open; Murcia, Spain; Clay – Challenger 75 – 32S/24Q/16D; Singles – Doubles	(France) Théo Arribagé (Romania) Victor Vlad Cornea; 7–5, 6–1	(India) Arjun Kadhe (India) Jeevan Nedunchezhiyan	(Spain) Albert Ramos Viñolas (Spain) Pablo Llamas Ruiz	(China) Bu Yunchaokete (Argentina) Marco Trungelliti (Moldova) Radu Albot (France) Richard Gasquet
March 18	Zadar Open; Zadar, Croatia; Clay – Challenger 75 – 32S/24Q/16D; Singles – Doubles	(Slovakia) Jozef Kovalík; 6–4, 6–2	(Bulgaria) Adrian Andreev	(Czech Republic) Jonáš Forejtek (Kazakhstan) Timofey Skatov	(Austria) Lukas Neumayer (Croatia) Nino Serdarušić (Italy) Enrico Dalla Valle (Austria) Sandro Kopp
March 18	Zadar Open; Zadar, Croatia; Clay – Challenger 75 – 32S/24Q/16D; Singles – Doubles	(France) Manuel Guinard (France) Grégoire Jacq; 6–4, 6–4	(Czech Republic) Roman Jebavý (Czech Republic) Zdeněk Kolář	(Czech Republic) Jonáš Forejtek (Kazakhstan) Timofey Skatov	(Austria) Lukas Neumayer (Croatia) Nino Serdarušić (Italy) Enrico Dalla Valle (Austria) Sandro Kopp
March 18	Yucatán Open; Mérida, Mexico; Clay – Challenger 50 – 32S/24Q/16D; Singles – Doubles	(United States) Tristan Boyer; 7–6^{(8–6)}, 6–2	(Argentina) Juan Pablo Ficovich	(Dominican Republic) Nick Hardt (Bolivia) Murkel Dellien	(Argentina) Facundo Mena (Kazakhstan) Dmitry Popko (Dominican Republic) Roberto Cid Subervi (United States) Stefan Kozlov
March 18	Yucatán Open; Mérida, Mexico; Clay – Challenger 50 – 32S/24Q/16D; Singles – Doubles	(Australia) Thomas Fancutt (United States) Hunter Reese; 7–5, 6–3	(United States) Boris Kozlov (United States) Stefan Kozlov	(Dominican Republic) Nick Hardt (Bolivia) Murkel Dellien	(Argentina) Facundo Mena (Kazakhstan) Dmitry Popko (Dominican Republic) Roberto Cid Subervi (United States) Stefan Kozlov
March 25	Tennis Napoli Cup; Naples, Italy; Clay – Challenger 125 – 32S/24Q/16D; Singles – Doubles	(Italy) Luca Nardi; 5–7, 7–6^{(7–3)}, 6–2	(France) Pierre-Hugues Herbert	(France) Corentin Moutet (Italy) Francesco Passaro	(Argentina) Federico Coria (France) Arthur Géa (France) Ugo Blanchet (Italy) Matteo Gigante
March 25	Tennis Napoli Cup; Naples, Italy; Clay – Challenger 125 – 32S/24Q/16D; Singles – Doubles	(Argentina) Guido Andreozzi (Mexico) Miguel Ángel Reyes-Varela; 6–4, 1–6, [10–7]	(France) Théo Arribagé (Romania) Victor Vlad Cornea	(France) Corentin Moutet (Italy) Francesco Passaro	(Argentina) Federico Coria (France) Arthur Géa (France) Ugo Blanchet (Italy) Matteo Gigante
March 25	Girona Challenger; Girona, Spain; Clay – Challenger 100 – 32S/24Q/16D; Singles – Doubles	(Spain) Pedro Martínez; 7–5, 6–4	(Moldova) Radu Albot	(Spain) Nikolás Sánchez Izquierdo (Germany) Benjamin Hassan	(Spain) Javier Barranco Cosano (Portugal) João Sousa (Chile) Cristian Garín (Netherlands) Jesper de Jong
March 25	Girona Challenger; Girona, Spain; Clay – Challenger 100 – 32S/24Q/16D; Singles – Doubles	(Ecuador) Gonzalo Escobar (Kazakhstan) Aleksandr Nedovyesov; 7–6^{(7–1)}, 6–4	(France) Jonathan Eysseric (France) Albano Olivetti	(Spain) Nikolás Sánchez Izquierdo (Germany) Benjamin Hassan	(Spain) Javier Barranco Cosano (Portugal) João Sousa (Chile) Cristian Garín (Netherlands) Jesper de Jong
March 25	San Luis Open Challenger; San Luis Potosí, Mexico; Clay – Challenger 75 – 32S/24Q/16D; Singles – Doubles	(Colombia) Nicolás Mejía; 6–1, 5–7, 6–2	(Chile) Matías Soto	(United States) Denis Kudla (France) Giovanni Mpetshi Perricard	(Argentina) Thiago Agustín Tirante (Australia) Bernard Tomic (Chile) Tomás Barrios Vera (Canada) Alexis Galarneau
March 25	San Luis Open Challenger; San Luis Potosí, Mexico; Clay – Challenger 75 – 32S/24Q/16D; Singles – Doubles	(India) Rithvik Choudary Bollipalli (India) Niki Kaliyanda Poonacha; 6–3, 6–2	(Switzerland) Antoine Bellier (Switzerland) Marc-Andrea Hüsler	(United States) Denis Kudla (France) Giovanni Mpetshi Perricard	(Argentina) Thiago Agustín Tirante (Australia) Bernard Tomic (Chile) Tomás Barrios Vera (Canada) Alexis Galarneau
March 25	São Léo Open; São Leopoldo, Brazil; Clay – Challenger 75 – 32S/24Q/16D; Singles – Doubles	(Paraguay) Daniel Vallejo; 6–3, 6–2	(France) Enzo Couacaud	(Peru) Juan Pablo Varillas (Brazil) Felipe Meligeni Alves	(Portugal) Gonçalo Oliveira (Argentina) Camilo Ugo Carabelli (Brazil) Matheus Pucinelli de Almeida (Brazil) Orlando Luz
March 25	São Léo Open; São Leopoldo, Brazil; Clay – Challenger 75 – 32S/24Q/16D; Singles – Doubles	(Brazil) Marcelo Demoliner (Brazil) Orlando Luz; 7–5, 3–6, [10–8]	(Canada) Liam Draxl (Italy) Alexander Weis	(Peru) Juan Pablo Varillas (Brazil) Felipe Meligeni Alves	(Portugal) Gonçalo Oliveira (Argentina) Camilo Ugo Carabelli (Brazil) Matheus Pucinelli de Almeida (Brazil) Orlando Luz

=== April ===
Week of	Tournament	Champions	Runners-up	Semifinalists	Quarterfinalists
April 1	Mexico City Open; Mexico City, Mexico; Clay – Challenger 125 – 32S/24Q/16D; Singles – Doubles	(Argentina) Thiago Agustín Tirante; 6–1, 6–3	(Canada) Alexis Galarneau	(Australia) Bernard Tomic (France) Maxime Janvier	(United Kingdom) Oliver Crawford (Tunisia) Skander Mansouri (United States) Aidan Mayo (Kazakhstan) Beibit Zhukayev
April 1	Mexico City Open; Mexico City, Mexico; Clay – Challenger 125 – 32S/24Q/16D; Singles – Doubles	(United States) Ryan Seggerman (United States) Patrik Trhac; 5–7, 6–4, [10–5]	(Australia) Tristan Schoolkate (Australia) Adam Walton	(Australia) Bernard Tomic (France) Maxime Janvier	(United Kingdom) Oliver Crawford (Tunisia) Skander Mansouri (United States) Aidan Mayo (Kazakhstan) Beibit Zhukayev
April 1	Sánchez-Casal Cup; Barcelona, Spain; Clay – Challenger 75 – 32S/24Q/16D; Singles – Doubles	(Dominican Republic) Nick Hardt; 6–4, 3–6, 6–2	(Spain) Bernabé Zapata Miralles	(Spain) Javier Barranco Cosano (Italy) Lorenzo Giustino	(Romania) Nicholas David Ionel (Spain) Carlos Taberner (Netherlands) Jesper de Jong (United Kingdom) Billy Harris
April 1	Sánchez-Casal Cup; Barcelona, Spain; Clay – Challenger 75 – 32S/24Q/16D; Singles – Doubles	(Spain) Daniel Rincón (Spain) Oriol Roca Batalla; 5–7, 6–4, [11–9]	(Germany) Jakob Schnaitter (Germany) Mark Wallner	(Spain) Javier Barranco Cosano (Italy) Lorenzo Giustino	(Romania) Nicholas David Ionel (Spain) Carlos Taberner (Netherlands) Jesper de Jong (United Kingdom) Billy Harris
April 1	Open Città della Disfida; Barletta, Italy; Clay – Challenger 75 – 32S/24Q/16D; Singles – Doubles	(Bosnia and Herzegovina) Damir Džumhur; 6–1, 6–3	(France) Harold Mayot	(Italy) Jacopo Berrettini (Kazakhstan) Timofey Skatov	(Poland) Maks Kaśnikowski (Romania) Filip Cristian Jianu (Italy) Riccardo Bonadio (Italy) Francesco Maestrelli
April 1	Open Città della Disfida; Barletta, Italy; Clay – Challenger 75 – 32S/24Q/16D; Singles – Doubles	(Czech Republic) Zdeněk Kolář (Chinese Taipei) Tseng Chun-hsin; 1–6, 6–3, [10–7]	(France) Théo Arribagé (France) Benjamin Bonzi	(Italy) Jacopo Berrettini (Kazakhstan) Timofey Skatov	(Poland) Maks Kaśnikowski (Romania) Filip Cristian Jianu (Italy) Riccardo Bonadio (Italy) Francesco Maestrelli
April 1	Engie Open Florianópolis; Florianópolis, Brazil; Clay – Challenger 75 – 32S/24Q/16D; Singles – Doubles	(France) Enzo Couacaud; 3–6, 6–4, 7–6^{(7–1)}	(Brazil) João Lucas Reis da Silva	(Argentina) Camilo Ugo Carabelli (Italy) Gianluca Mager	(Brazil) Orlando Luz (Bolivia) Juan Carlos Prado Ángelo (Argentina) Román Andrés Burruchaga (Israel) Daniel Cukierman
April 1	Engie Open Florianópolis; Florianópolis, Brazil; Clay – Challenger 75 – 32S/24Q/16D; Singles – Doubles	(Israel) Daniel Cukierman (Spain) Carlos Sánchez Jover; 6–0, 3–6, [10–4]	(Argentina) Lorenzo Joaquín Rodríguez (Uruguay) Franco Roncadelli	(Argentina) Camilo Ugo Carabelli (Italy) Gianluca Mager	(Brazil) Orlando Luz (Bolivia) Juan Carlos Prado Ángelo (Argentina) Román Andrés Burruchaga (Israel) Daniel Cukierman
April 8	Busan Open; Busan, South Korea; Hard – Challenger 125 – 32S/24Q/16D; Singles – Doubles	(Japan) Yasutaka Uchiyama; 7–6^{(7–4)}, 6–3	(South Korea) Hong Seong-chan	(Australia) James Duckworth (South Korea) Kwon Soon-woo	(Ukraine) Illya Marchenko (United Kingdom) Paul Jubb (South Africa) Lloyd Harris (Hong Kong) Coleman Wong
April 8	Busan Open; Busan, South Korea; Hard – Challenger 125 – 32S/24Q/16D; Singles – Doubles	(Chinese Taipei) Ray Ho (South Korea) Nam Ji-sung; 6–2, 6–4	(South Korea) Chung Yun-seong (Chinese Taipei) Hsu Yu-hsiou	(Australia) James Duckworth (South Korea) Kwon Soon-woo	(Ukraine) Illya Marchenko (United Kingdom) Paul Jubb (South Africa) Lloyd Harris (Hong Kong) Coleman Wong
April 8	Open Comunidad de Madrid; Madrid, Spain; Clay – Challenger 100 – 32S/24Q/16D; Singles – Doubles	(Italy) Stefano Napolitano; 6–3, 6–3	(Switzerland) Leandro Riedi	(Austria) Jurij Rodionov (Kazakhstan) Mikhail Kukushkin	(Germany) Benjamin Hassan (Brazil) João Fonseca (Switzerland) Marc-Andrea Hüsler (Spain) Albert Ramos Viñolas
April 8	Open Comunidad de Madrid; Madrid, Spain; Clay – Challenger 100 – 32S/24Q/16D; Singles – Doubles	(Finland) Harri Heliövaara (United Kingdom) Henry Patten; 7–5, 7–6^{(7–1)}	(Argentina) Guido Andreozzi (Mexico) Miguel Ángel Reyes-Varela	(Austria) Jurij Rodionov (Kazakhstan) Mikhail Kukushkin	(Germany) Benjamin Hassan (Brazil) João Fonseca (Switzerland) Marc-Andrea Hüsler (Spain) Albert Ramos Viñolas
April 8	Morelos Open; Cuernavaca, Mexico; Hard – Challenger 75 – 32S/24Q/16D; Singles – Doubles	(France) Giovanni Mpetshi Perricard; 7–5, 7–5	(Colombia) Nicolás Mejía	(United States) Maxime Cressy (Australia) Adam Walton	(Canada) Alexis Galarneau (Canada) Vasek Pospisil (Kazakhstan) Beibit Zhukayev (France) Maxime Janvier
April 8	Morelos Open; Cuernavaca, Mexico; Hard – Challenger 75 – 32S/24Q/16D; Singles – Doubles	(India) Arjun Kadhe (India) Jeevan Nedunchezhiyan; 7–6^{(7–5)}, 6–4	(Poland) Piotr Matuszewski (Australia) Matthew Romios	(United States) Maxime Cressy (Australia) Adam Walton	(Canada) Alexis Galarneau (Canada) Vasek Pospisil (Kazakhstan) Beibit Zhukayev (France) Maxime Janvier
April 8	Sarasota Open; Sarasota, United States; Clay – Challenger 75 – 32S/24Q/16D; Singles – Doubles	(Australia) Thanasi Kokkinakis; 6–3, 1–6, 6–0	(Belgium) Zizou Bergs	(United States) Tennys Sandgren (Australia) Marc Polmans	(United States) Stefan Kozlov (United States) Mitchell Krueger (Canada) Gabriel Diallo (France) Calvin Hemery
April 8	Sarasota Open; Sarasota, United States; Clay – Challenger 75 – 32S/24Q/16D; Singles – Doubles	(United States) Tristan Boyer (United Kingdom) Oliver Crawford; 6–4, 6–2	(United States) Ethan Quinn (United States) Tennys Sandgren	(United States) Tennys Sandgren (Australia) Marc Polmans	(United States) Stefan Kozlov (United States) Mitchell Krueger (Canada) Gabriel Diallo (France) Calvin Hemery
April 8	Split Open; Split, Croatia; Clay – Challenger 75 – 32S/24Q/16D; Singles – Doubles	(Slovakia) Jozef Kovalík; 6–4, 5–7, 7–5	(Hungary) Zsombor Piros	(Croatia) Matej Dodig (France) Benjamin Bonzi	(Austria) Filip Misolic (Denmark) Elmer Møller (Italy) Stefano Travaglia (Germany) Henri Squire
April 8	Split Open; Split, Croatia; Clay – Challenger 75 – 32S/24Q/16D; Singles – Doubles	(France) Jonathan Eysseric (Netherlands) Bart Stevens; 0–6, 6–4, [10–8]	(Sweden) Filip Bergevi (Netherlands) Mick Veldheer	(Croatia) Matej Dodig (France) Benjamin Bonzi	(Austria) Filip Misolic (Denmark) Elmer Møller (Italy) Stefano Travaglia (Germany) Henri Squire
April 15	GNP Seguros Tennis Open; Acapulco, Mexico; Hard – Challenger 125 – 32S/24Q/16D; Singles – Doubles	(France) Giovanni Mpetshi Perricard; 6–3, 6–3	(Australia) Adam Walton	(Canada) Alexis Galarneau (United States) Zachary Svajda	(Australia) Rinky Hijikata (Australia) Tristan Schoolkate (United States) Maxime Cressy (Mexico) Rodrigo Pacheco Méndez
April 15	GNP Seguros Tennis Open; Acapulco, Mexico; Hard – Challenger 125 – 32S/24Q/16D; Singles – Doubles	(India) Rithvik Choudary Bollipalli (India) Niki Kaliyanda Poonacha; 7–6^{(7–4)}, 7–5	(United Kingdom) Luke Johnson (Tunisia) Skander Mansouri	(Canada) Alexis Galarneau (United States) Zachary Svajda	(Australia) Rinky Hijikata (Australia) Tristan Schoolkate (United States) Maxime Cressy (Mexico) Rodrigo Pacheco Méndez
April 15	Open de Oeiras; Oeiras, Portugal; Clay – Challenger 125 – 32S/24Q/16D; Singles – Doubles	(Argentina) Francisco Comesaña; 6–4, 3–6, 7–5	(France) Ugo Blanchet	(France) Valentin Royer (Portugal) Jaime Faria	(Italy) Stefano Napolitano (Austria) Dennis Novak (Italy) Samuel Vincent Ruggeri (Lithuania) Vilius Gaubas
April 15	Open de Oeiras; Oeiras, Portugal; Clay – Challenger 125 – 32S/24Q/16D; Singles – Doubles	(Sweden) Filip Bergevi (Netherlands) Mick Veldheer; 6–1, 6–4	(Spain) Sergio Martos Gornés (Greece) Petros Tsitsipas	(France) Valentin Royer (Portugal) Jaime Faria	(Italy) Stefano Napolitano (Austria) Dennis Novak (Italy) Samuel Vincent Ruggeri (Lithuania) Vilius Gaubas
April 15	Gwangju Open; Gwangju, South Korea; Hard – Challenger 75 – 32S/24Q/16D; Singles – Doubles	(South Africa) Lloyd Harris; 6–2, 3–6, 6–4	(China) Bu Yunchaokete	(Lithuania) Ričardas Berankis (Chinese Taipei) Wu Tung-lin	(Chinese Taipei) Hsu Yu-hsiou (Estonia) Mark Lajal (Japan) Sho Shimabukuro; Alibek Kachmazov
April 15	Gwangju Open; Gwangju, South Korea; Hard – Challenger 75 – 32S/24Q/16D; Singles – Doubles	(South Korea) Lee Jea-moon (South Korea) Song Min-kyu; 1–6, 6–1, [10–3]	(China) Cui Jie (South Korea) Lee Duck-hee	(Lithuania) Ričardas Berankis (Chinese Taipei) Wu Tung-lin	(Chinese Taipei) Hsu Yu-hsiou (Estonia) Mark Lajal (Japan) Sho Shimabukuro; Alibek Kachmazov
April 15	Tallahassee Tennis Challenger; Tallahassee, United States; Clay – Challenger 75 – 32S/24Q/16D; Singles – Doubles	(Belgium) Zizou Bergs; 6–4, 7–6^{(11–9)}	(United States) Mitchell Krueger	(United States) Stefan Kozlov (France) Calvin Hemery	(Austria) Joel Schwärzler (United Kingdom) Oliver Crawford (Switzerland) Alexander Ritschard (Austria) Gerald Melzer
April 15	Tallahassee Tennis Challenger; Tallahassee, United States; Clay – Challenger 75 – 32S/24Q/16D; Singles – Doubles	(Sweden) Simon Freund (Denmark) Johannes Ingildsen; 7–5, 7–6^{(7–4)}	(United States) William Blumberg (Venezuela) Luis David Martínez	(United States) Stefan Kozlov (France) Calvin Hemery	(Austria) Joel Schwärzler (United Kingdom) Oliver Crawford (Switzerland) Alexander Ritschard (Austria) Gerald Melzer
April 15	Challenger Tucumán; San Miguel de Tucumán, Argentina; Clay – Challenger 50 – 32S/24Q/16D; Singles – Doubles	(Argentina) Andrea Collarini; 6–4, 7–6^{(7–3)}	(Argentina) Hernán Casanova	(Argentina) Lautaro Midón (Argentina) Valerio Aboian	(Uruguay) Franco Roncadelli (Argentina) Gonzalo Villanueva (Turkey) Ergi Kırkın (Argentina) Renzo Olivo
April 15	Challenger Tucumán; San Miguel de Tucumán, Argentina; Clay – Challenger 50 – 32S/24Q/16D; Singles – Doubles	(Brazil) Luís Britto (Argentina) Gonzalo Villanueva; 6–3, 6–2	(Australia) Patrick Harper (United Kingdom) David Stevenson	(Argentina) Lautaro Midón (Argentina) Valerio Aboian	(Uruguay) Franco Roncadelli (Argentina) Gonzalo Villanueva (Turkey) Ergi Kırkın (Argentina) Renzo Olivo
April 22	Ostra Group Open; Ostrava, Czech Republic; Clay – Challenger 75 – 32S/24Q/16D; Singles – Doubles	(Bosnia and Herzegovina) Damir Džumhur; 6–2, 4–6, 7–5	(Germany) Henri Squire	(France) Manuel Guinard (Kazakhstan) Timofey Skatov	(Italy) Enrico Dalla Valle (Portugal) Jaime Faria (Czech Republic) Zdeněk Kolář (Austria) Dennis Novak
April 22	Ostra Group Open; Ostrava, Czech Republic; Clay – Challenger 75 – 32S/24Q/16D; Singles – Doubles	(Portugal) Jaime Faria (Portugal) Henrique Rocha; 7–5, 6–3	(Germany) Jakob Schnaitter (Germany) Mark Wallner	(France) Manuel Guinard (Kazakhstan) Timofey Skatov	(Italy) Enrico Dalla Valle (Portugal) Jaime Faria (Czech Republic) Zdeněk Kolář (Austria) Dennis Novak
April 22	Garden Open; Rome, Italy; Clay – Challenger 75 – 32S/24Q/16D; Singles – Doubles	(Spain) Alejandro Moro Cañas; 7–5, 6–3	(Lithuania) Vilius Gaubas	(Italy) Stefano Travaglia (Bolivia) Hugo Dellien	(Netherlands) Jesper de Jong (Italy) Francesco Maestrelli (United Kingdom) Billy Harris (United States) Nicolas Moreno de Alboran
April 22	Garden Open; Rome, Italy; Clay – Challenger 75 – 32S/24Q/16D; Singles – Doubles	(United Kingdom) Luke Johnson (Tunisia) Skander Mansouri; 6–2, 6–4	(Italy) Lorenzo Rottoli (Italy) Samuel Vincent Ruggeri	(Italy) Stefano Travaglia (Bolivia) Hugo Dellien	(Netherlands) Jesper de Jong (Italy) Francesco Maestrelli (United Kingdom) Billy Harris (United States) Nicolas Moreno de Alboran
April 22	Savannah Challenger; Savannah, United States; Clay – Challenger 75 – 32S/24Q/16D; Singles – Doubles	(Switzerland) Alexander Ritschard; 6–2, 6–4	(Ecuador) Andrés Andrade	(Kazakhstan) Dmitry Popko (France) Maxime Janvier	(France) Calvin Hemery (Netherlands) Gijs Brouwer (United States) Tristan Boyer (Argentina) Federico Agustín Gómez
April 22	Savannah Challenger; Savannah, United States; Clay – Challenger 75 – 32S/24Q/16D; Singles – Doubles	(United States) Christian Harrison (United Kingdom) Marcus Willis; 6–3, 6–3	(Sweden) Simon Freund (Denmark) Johannes Ingildsen	(Kazakhstan) Dmitry Popko (France) Maxime Janvier	(France) Calvin Hemery (Netherlands) Gijs Brouwer (United States) Tristan Boyer (Argentina) Federico Agustín Gómez
April 22	Shenzhen Luohu Challenger; Shenzhen, China; Hard – Challenger 75 – 32S/24Q/16D; Singles – Doubles	(South Africa) Lloyd Harris; 6–3, 6–3	(Australia) James Duckworth	(Switzerland) Rémy Bertola (Estonia) Mark Lajal	(Italy) Mattia Bellucci (Australia) Tristan Schoolkate; Alibek Kachmazov (Kazakhstan) Denis Yevseyev
April 22	Shenzhen Luohu Challenger; Shenzhen, China; Hard – Challenger 75 – 32S/24Q/16D; Singles – Doubles	(Japan) Yuta Shimizu (Japan) James Trotter; 7–6^{(7–5)}, 7–6^{(7–4)}	(China) Wang Aoran (China) Zhou Yi	(Switzerland) Rémy Bertola (Estonia) Mark Lajal	(Italy) Mattia Bellucci (Australia) Tristan Schoolkate; Alibek Kachmazov (Kazakhstan) Denis Yevseyev
April 22	Challenger Concepción; Concepción, Chile; Clay – Challenger 50 – 32S/24Q/16D; Singles – Doubles	(Peru) Gonzalo Bueno; 6–4, 6–0	(Argentina) Juan Pablo Ficovich	(Brazil) José Pereira (Greece) Stefanos Sakellaridis	(Argentina) Genaro Alberto Olivieri (Ecuador) Álvaro Guillén Meza (Argentina) Facundo Mena (Bolivia) Juan Carlos Prado Ángelo
April 22	Challenger Concepción; Concepción, Chile; Clay – Challenger 50 – 32S/24Q/16D; Singles – Doubles	(Japan) Seita Watanabe (Japan) Takeru Yuzuki; 6–4, 7–6^{(8–6)}	(Australia) Patrick Harper (United Kingdom) David Stevenson	(Brazil) José Pereira (Greece) Stefanos Sakellaridis	(Argentina) Genaro Alberto Olivieri (Ecuador) Álvaro Guillén Meza (Argentina) Facundo Mena (Bolivia) Juan Carlos Prado Ángelo
April 29	Open Aix Provence; Aix-en-Provence, France; Clay – Challenger 175 – 28S/16Q/16D; Singles – Doubles	(Chile) Alejandro Tabilo; 6–3, 6–2	(Spain) Jaume Munar	(Monaco) Valentin Vacherot; Roman Safiullin	(France) Richard Gasquet (Argentina) Facundo Bagnis (United States) Brandon Nakashima (Argentina) Tomás Martín Etcheverry
April 29	Open Aix Provence; Aix-en-Provence, France; Clay – Challenger 175 – 28S/16Q/16D; Singles – Doubles	(United Kingdom) Luke Johnson (Tunisia) Skander Mansouri; 6–3, 6–3	(Ecuador) Diego Hidalgo (Colombia) Cristian Rodríguez	(Monaco) Valentin Vacherot; Roman Safiullin	(France) Richard Gasquet (Argentina) Facundo Bagnis (United States) Brandon Nakashima (Argentina) Tomás Martín Etcheverry
April 29	Sardegna Open; Cagliari, Italy; Clay – Challenger 175 – 28S/16Q/16D; Singles – Doubles	(Argentina) Mariano Navone; 7–5, 6–1	(Italy) Lorenzo Musetti	(Italy) Luciano Darderi (Colombia) Daniel Elahi Galán	(Argentina) Federico Coria (United States) Emilio Nava (Hungary) Márton Fucsovics (Portugal) Nuno Borges
April 29	Sardegna Open; Cagliari, Italy; Clay – Challenger 175 – 28S/16Q/16D; Singles – Doubles	(India) Sriram Balaji (Germany) Andre Begemann; 6–4, 6–7^{(3–7)}, [10–6]	(Bolivia) Boris Arias (Bolivia) Federico Zeballos	(Italy) Luciano Darderi (Colombia) Daniel Elahi Galán	(Argentina) Federico Coria (United States) Emilio Nava (Hungary) Márton Fucsovics (Portugal) Nuno Borges
April 29	Guangzhou International Challenger; Guangzhou, China; Hard – Challenger 75 – 32S/24Q/16D; Singles – Doubles	(Australia) Tristan Schoolkate; 6–3, 3–6, 6–3	(Australia) Adam Walton	(United States) Maxime Cressy (China) Bu Yunchaokete	(Chinese Taipei) Hsu Yu-hsiou (Japan) Yuta Shimizu (Kazakhstan) Beibit Zhukayev (Australia) James Duckworth
April 29	Guangzhou International Challenger; Guangzhou, China; Hard – Challenger 75 – 32S/24Q/16D; Singles – Doubles	(Australia) Blake Ellis (Australia) Tristan Schoolkate; 6–2, 6–7^{(4–7)}, [10–4]	(South Korea) Nam Ji-sung (Finland) Patrik Niklas-Salminen	(United States) Maxime Cressy (China) Bu Yunchaokete	(Chinese Taipei) Hsu Yu-hsiou (Japan) Yuta Shimizu (Kazakhstan) Beibit Zhukayev (Australia) James Duckworth
April 29	Brasil Tennis Open; Porto Alegre, Brazil; Clay – Challenger 50 – 32S/24Q/16D; Singles – Doubles	(Turkey) Ergi Kırkın; 6–3, 7–5	(Brazil) Daniel Dutra da Silva	(Argentina) Facundo Mena (Peru) Gonzalo Bueno	(Brazil) Karue Sell (Argentina) Guido Iván Justo (Bolivia) Juan Carlos Prado Ángelo (Argentina) Juan Bautista Torres
April 29	Brasil Tennis Open; Porto Alegre, Brazil; Clay – Challenger 50 – 32S/24Q/16D; Singles – Doubles	(Dominican Republic) Roberto Cid Subervi (Japan) Kaichi Uchida; 5–7, 7–6^{(7–1)}, [10–6]	(Australia) Patrick Harper (United Kingdom) David Stevenson	(Argentina) Facundo Mena (Peru) Gonzalo Bueno	(Brazil) Karue Sell (Argentina) Guido Iván Justo (Bolivia) Juan Carlos Prado Ángelo (Argentina) Juan Bautista Torres

=== May ===
Week of	Tournament	Champions	Runners-up	Semifinalists	Quarterfinalists
May 6	Upper Austria Open; Mauthausen, Austria; Clay – Challenger 100 – 32S/24Q/16D; Singles – Doubles	(France) Lucas Pouille; 6–3, 6–3	(Slovakia) Jozef Kovalík	(Argentina) Francisco Comesaña (Bulgaria) Dimitar Kuzmanov	(Austria) Filip Misolic (Germany) Max Hans Rehberg (Austria) Joel Schwärzler (Austria) Gerald Melzer
May 6	Upper Austria Open; Mauthausen, Austria; Clay – Challenger 100 – 32S/24Q/16D; Singles – Doubles	(Germany) Constantin Frantzen (Germany) Hendrik Jebens; 6–4, 6–4	(United States) Ryan Seggerman (United States) Patrik Trhac	(Argentina) Francisco Comesaña (Bulgaria) Dimitar Kuzmanov	(Austria) Filip Misolic (Germany) Max Hans Rehberg (Austria) Joel Schwärzler (Austria) Gerald Melzer
May 6	Internazionali di Tennis Francavilla al Mare; Francavilla al Mare, Italy; Clay – Challenger 75 – 32S/24Q/16D; Singles – Doubles	(France) Titouan Droguet; 6–3, 7–6^{(7–4)}	(Italy) Jacopo Berrettini	(Italy) Franco Agamenone (Dominican Republic) Nick Hardt	(Italy) Gabriele Piraino (Netherlands) Ryan Nijboer (Italy) Andrea Pellegrino (Denmark) Elmer Møller
May 6	Internazionali di Tennis Francavilla al Mare; Francavilla al Mare, Italy; Clay – Challenger 75 – 32S/24Q/16D; Singles – Doubles	(France) Théo Arribagé (Romania) Victor Vlad Cornea; 7–6^{(7–1)}, 7–6^{(9–7)}	(Netherlands) Sander Arends (Netherlands) Matwé Middelkoop	(Italy) Franco Agamenone (Dominican Republic) Nick Hardt	(Italy) Gabriele Piraino (Netherlands) Ryan Nijboer (Italy) Andrea Pellegrino (Denmark) Elmer Møller
May 6	Advantage Cars Prague Open; Prague, Czech Republic; Clay – Challenger 75 – 32S/24Q/16D; Singles – Doubles	(Czech Republic) Jiří Veselý; 6–2, 3–6, 7–6^{(7–3)}	(Belgium) Gauthier Onclin	(United States) Toby Kodat (Slovakia) Alex Molčan	(Portugal) Henrique Rocha (Italy) Giovanni Fonio (Germany) Rudolf Molleker (Spain) Javier Barranco Cosano
May 6	Advantage Cars Prague Open; Prague, Czech Republic; Clay – Challenger 75 – 32S/24Q/16D; Singles – Doubles	(Germany) Jakob Schnaitter (Germany) Mark Wallner; 6–3, 6–1	(Czech Republic) Jiří Barnat (Czech Republic) Jan Hrazdil	(United States) Toby Kodat (Slovakia) Alex Molčan	(Portugal) Henrique Rocha (Italy) Giovanni Fonio (Germany) Rudolf Molleker (Spain) Javier Barranco Cosano
May 6	Wuxi Open; Wuxi, China; Hard – Challenger 75 – 32S/24Q/16D; Singles – Doubles	(China) Bu Yunchaokete; 6–4, 6–1	Egor Gerasimov	Alibek Kachmazov (Australia) Philip Sekulic	(China) Cui Jie (Australia) Adam Walton (Chinese Taipei) Wu Tung-lin (Switzerland) Rémy Bertola
May 6	Wuxi Open; Wuxi, China; Hard – Challenger 75 – 32S/24Q/16D; Singles – Doubles	(Australia) Calum Puttergill (United States) Reese Stalder; 7–6^{(10–8)}, 7–6^{(7–4)}	(Japan) Toshihide Matsui (Japan) Kaito Uesugi	Alibek Kachmazov (Australia) Philip Sekulic	(China) Cui Jie (Australia) Adam Walton (Chinese Taipei) Wu Tung-lin (Switzerland) Rémy Bertola
May 6	Santos Brasil Tennis Cup; Santos, Brazil; Clay – Challenger 50 – 32S/24Q/16D; Singles – Doubles	(Argentina) Alejo Lorenzo Lingua Lavallén; 4–6, 6–4, 6–3	(Lebanon) Hady Habib	(Argentina) Juan Bautista Torres (Argentina) Santiago Rodríguez Taverna	(Argentina) Hernán Casanova (United States) Bruno Kuzuhara (Paraguay) Daniel Vallejo (Argentina) Gonzalo Villanueva
May 6	Santos Brasil Tennis Cup; Santos, Brazil; Clay – Challenger 50 – 32S/24Q/16D; Singles – Doubles	(Israel) Roy Stepanov (Colombia) Andrés Urrea; Walkover	(Lebanon) Hady Habib (United States) Trey Hilderbrand	(Argentina) Juan Bautista Torres (Argentina) Santiago Rodríguez Taverna	(Argentina) Hernán Casanova (United States) Bruno Kuzuhara (Paraguay) Daniel Vallejo (Argentina) Gonzalo Villanueva
May 13	BNP Paribas Primrose Bordeaux; Bordeaux, France; Clay – Challenger 175 – 28S/16Q/16D; Singles – Doubles	(France) Arthur Fils; 6–2, 6–3	(Spain) Pedro Martínez	(France) Grégoire Barrère (China) Shang Juncheng	(Australia) Thanasi Kokkinakis (France) Giovanni Mpetshi Perricard (United Kingdom) Dan Evans (Spain) Roberto Bautista Agut
May 13	BNP Paribas Primrose Bordeaux; Bordeaux, France; Clay – Challenger 175 – 28S/16Q/16D; Singles – Doubles	(United Kingdom) Julian Cash (United States) Robert Galloway; 6–3, 7–6^{(7–2)}	(France) Quentin Halys (France) Nicolas Mahut	(France) Grégoire Barrère (China) Shang Juncheng	(Australia) Thanasi Kokkinakis (France) Giovanni Mpetshi Perricard (United Kingdom) Dan Evans (Spain) Roberto Bautista Agut
May 13	Piemonte Open; Turin, Italy; Clay – Challenger 175 – 28S/16Q/16D; Singles – Doubles	(Italy) Francesco Passaro; 6–3, 7–5	(Italy) Lorenzo Musetti	(Italy) Luciano Darderi (Italy) Lorenzo Sonego	(Brazil) Felipe Meligeni Alves (Italy) Matteo Arnaldi (United States) J. J. Wolf (United States) Brandon Nakashima
May 13	Piemonte Open; Turin, Italy; Clay – Challenger 175 – 28S/16Q/16D; Singles – Doubles	(Finland) Harri Heliövaara (United Kingdom) Henry Patten; 6–3, 6–3	(Germany) Andreas Mies (United Kingdom) Neal Skupski	(Italy) Luciano Darderi (Italy) Lorenzo Sonego	(Brazil) Felipe Meligeni Alves (Italy) Matteo Arnaldi (United States) J. J. Wolf (United States) Brandon Nakashima
May 13	Open de Oeiras II; Oeiras, Portugal; Clay – Challenger 75 – 32S/24Q/16D; Singles – Doubles	(Portugal) Jaime Faria; 3–6, 7–6^{(7–3)}, 6–4	(Sweden) Elias Ymer	(Argentina) Román Andrés Burruchaga (Kazakhstan) Denis Yevseyev	(Austria) Dennis Novak (Belgium) Joris De Loore (Kazakhstan) Beibit Zhukayev (United Kingdom) Jan Choinski
May 13	Open de Oeiras II; Oeiras, Portugal; Clay – Challenger 75 – 32S/24Q/16D; Singles – Doubles	(India) Anirudh Chandrasekar (India) Arjun Kadhe; 7–5, 6–4	(Sweden) Simon Freund (Denmark) Johannes Ingildsen	(Argentina) Román Andrés Burruchaga (Kazakhstan) Denis Yevseyev	(Austria) Dennis Novak (Belgium) Joris De Loore (Kazakhstan) Beibit Zhukayev (United Kingdom) Jan Choinski
May 13	Santaizi ATP Challenger; Taipei, Taiwan; Hard – Challenger 75 – 32S/24Q/16D; Singles – Doubles	(Australia) Adam Walton; 3–6, 6–2, 7–6^{(7–3)}	(Ukraine) Illya Marchenko	(Chinese Taipei) Hsu Yu-hsiou (Australia) James Duckworth	(Australia) Max Purcell (South Korea) Hong Seong-chan (Lithuania) Ričardas Berankis (United Kingdom) Arthur Fery
May 13	Santaizi ATP Challenger; Taipei, Taiwan; Hard – Challenger 75 – 32S/24Q/16D; Singles – Doubles	(Chinese Taipei) Ray Ho (South Korea) Nam Ji-sung; 6–2, 6–2	(Japan) Toshihide Matsui (Japan) Kaito Uesugi	(Chinese Taipei) Hsu Yu-hsiou (Australia) James Duckworth	(Australia) Max Purcell (South Korea) Hong Seong-chan (Lithuania) Ričardas Berankis (United Kingdom) Arthur Fery
May 13	Tunis Open; Tunis, Tunisia; Clay – Challenger 75 – 32S/24Q/16D; Singles – Doubles	(Spain) Oriol Roca Batalla; 7–6^{(7–5)}, 7–5	(France) Valentin Royer	(Monaco) Valentin Vacherot (Bosnia and Herzegovina) Damir Džumhur	(Kazakhstan) Timofey Skatov (Argentina) Genaro Alberto Olivieri (Bolivia) Murkel Dellien (France) Clément Tabur
May 13	Tunis Open; Tunis, Tunisia; Clay – Challenger 75 – 32S/24Q/16D; Singles – Doubles	(Argentina) Federico Agustín Gómez (United Kingdom) Marcus Willis; 4–6, 6–1, [10–6]	(Czech Republic) Patrik Rikl (Czech Republic) Michael Vrbenský	(Monaco) Valentin Vacherot (Bosnia and Herzegovina) Damir Džumhur	(Kazakhstan) Timofey Skatov (Argentina) Genaro Alberto Olivieri (Bolivia) Murkel Dellien (France) Clément Tabur
May 20	Macedonian Open; Skopje, North Macedonia; Clay – Challenger 75 – 32S/24Q/16D; Singles – Doubles	(Austria) Joel Schwärzler; 6–3, 6–3	(Poland) Kamil Majchrzak	(United States) Ryan Seggerman (South Korea) Gerard Campaña Lee	(Italy) Alexander Weis (Austria) Neil Oberleitner (Italy) Marco Cecchinato (Czech Republic) Andrew Paulson
May 20	Macedonian Open; Skopje, North Macedonia; Clay – Challenger 75 – 32S/24Q/16D; Singles – Doubles	(United States) Ryan Seggerman (United States) Patrik Trhac; 6–3, 7–6^{(7–4)}	(Czech Republic) Andrew Paulson (Czech Republic) Patrik Rikl	(United States) Ryan Seggerman (South Korea) Gerard Campaña Lee	(Italy) Alexander Weis (Austria) Neil Oberleitner (Italy) Marco Cecchinato (Czech Republic) Andrew Paulson
May 20	Schwaben Open; Augsburg, Germany; Clay – Challenger 50 – 32S/24Q/16D; Singles – Doubles	(Kazakhstan) Timofey Skatov; 3–6, 7–5, 6–3	(Denmark) Elmer Møller	(Germany) Daniel Masur (Italy) Riccardo Bonadio	(United States) Toby Kodat (Germany) Lucas Gerch (Spain) Carlos Taberner (Argentina) Federico Agustín Gómez
May 20	Schwaben Open; Augsburg, Germany; Clay – Challenger 50 – 32S/24Q/16D; Singles – Doubles	(Germany) Jakob Schnaitter (Germany) Mark Wallner; 3–6, 6–2, [10–8]	(Austria) David Pichler (Czech Republic) Michael Vrbenský	(Germany) Daniel Masur (Italy) Riccardo Bonadio	(United States) Toby Kodat (Germany) Lucas Gerch (Spain) Carlos Taberner (Argentina) Federico Agustín Gómez
May 20	Kachreti Challenger; Kachreti, Georgia; Hard – Challenger 50 – 32S/24Q/16D; Singles – Doubles	(France) Robin Bertrand; 6–1, 3–6, 7–5	(Georgia (country)) Aleksandre Bakshi	(Australia) Philip Sekulic (United Kingdom) Paul Jubb	(India) Ramkumar Ramanathan (Australia) Blake Mott; Egor Gerasimov (Estonia) Daniil Glinka
May 20	Kachreti Challenger; Kachreti, Georgia; Hard – Challenger 50 – 32S/24Q/16D; Singles – Doubles	(United Kingdom) Charles Broom (United Kingdom) Ben Jones; 3–6, 6–1, [10–8]	Evgeny Karlovskiy; Evgenii Tiurnev	(Australia) Philip Sekulic (United Kingdom) Paul Jubb	(India) Ramkumar Ramanathan (Australia) Blake Mott; Egor Gerasimov (Estonia) Daniil Glinka
May 27	Little Rock Challenger; Little Rock, United States; Hard – Challenger 75 – 32S/24Q/16D; Singles – Doubles	(United States) Mitchell Krueger; 6–3, 6–4	(Japan) Yuta Shimizu	(Jordan) Abdullah Shelbayh (United States) Nishesh Basavareddy	(Canada) Alexis Galarneau (United States) Brandon Holt (United States) Trevor Svajda (United States) Rudy Quan
May 27	Little Rock Challenger; Little Rock, United States; Hard – Challenger 75 – 32S/24Q/16D; Singles – Doubles	(Canada) Liam Draxl (Canada) Benjamin Sigouin; 6–4, 3–6, [10–7]	(India) Rithvik Choudary Bollipalli (Mexico) Hans Hach Verdugo	(Jordan) Abdullah Shelbayh (United States) Nishesh Basavareddy	(Canada) Alexis Galarneau (United States) Brandon Holt (United States) Trevor Svajda (United States) Rudy Quan
May 27	Internazionali di Tennis Città di Vicenza; Vicenza, Italy; Clay – Challenger 75 – 32S/24Q/16D; Singles – Doubles	(Chinese Taipei) Tseng Chun-hsin; 6–3, 6–2	(Argentina) Marco Trungelliti	(Italy) Francesco Passaro (Bosnia and Herzegovina) Nerman Fatić	(Kazakhstan) Dmitry Popko (Bolivia) Murkel Dellien (Chile) Tomás Barrios Vera (Bulgaria) Adrian Andreev
May 27	Internazionali di Tennis Città di Vicenza; Vicenza, Italy; Clay – Challenger 75 – 32S/24Q/16D; Singles – Doubles	(Ukraine) Vladyslav Manafov (Finland) Patrik Niklas-Salminen; 6–3, 6–4	(Germany) Andre Begemann (India) Niki Kaliyanda Poonacha	(Italy) Francesco Passaro (Bosnia and Herzegovina) Nerman Fatić	(Kazakhstan) Dmitry Popko (Bolivia) Murkel Dellien (Chile) Tomás Barrios Vera (Bulgaria) Adrian Andreev

=== June ===
Week of	Tournament	Champions	Runners-up	Semifinalists	Quarterfinalists
June 3	Surbiton Trophy; Surbiton, United Kingdom; Grass – Challenger 125 – 32S/24Q/16D; Singles – Doubles	(South Africa) Lloyd Harris; 7–6^{(10–8)}, 7–5	(Switzerland) Leandro Riedi	(United Kingdom) Billy Harris (United States) Brandon Nakashima	(Kazakhstan) Mikhail Kukushkin (Kazakhstan) Beibit Zhukayev (Japan) Shintaro Mochizuki (United States) Zachary Svajda
June 3	Surbiton Trophy; Surbiton, United Kingdom; Grass – Challenger 125 – 32S/24Q/16D; Singles – Doubles	(United Kingdom) Julian Cash (United States) Robert Galloway; 6–4, 6–4	(Colombia) Nicolás Barrientos (Ecuador) Diego Hidalgo	(United Kingdom) Billy Harris (United States) Brandon Nakashima	(Kazakhstan) Mikhail Kukushkin (Kazakhstan) Beibit Zhukayev (Japan) Shintaro Mochizuki (United States) Zachary Svajda
June 3	Heilbronner Neckarcup; Heilbronn, Germany; Clay – Challenger 100 – 32S/24Q/16D; Singles – Doubles	(India) Sumit Nagal; 6–1, 6–7^{(5–7)}, 6–3	(Switzerland) Alexander Ritschard	(France) Luca Van Assche (United Kingdom) Jan Choinski	(Poland) Maks Kaśnikowski; Ivan Gakhov (Germany) Henri Squire (Spain) Alejandro Moro Cañas
June 3	Heilbronner Neckarcup; Heilbronn, Germany; Clay – Challenger 100 – 32S/24Q/16D; Singles – Doubles	(Monaco) Romain Arneodo (France) Geoffrey Blancaneaux; 7–6^{(7–5)}, 5–7, [10–3]	(Germany) Jakob Schnaitter (Germany) Mark Wallner	(France) Luca Van Assche (United Kingdom) Jan Choinski	(Poland) Maks Kaśnikowski; Ivan Gakhov (Germany) Henri Squire (Spain) Alejandro Moro Cañas
June 3	UniCredit Czech Open; Prostějov, Czech Republic; Clay – Challenger 100 – 32S/24Q/16D; Singles – Doubles	(Switzerland) Jérôme Kym; 6–2, 3–6, 6–2	(Chinese Taipei) Tseng Chun-hsin	(Serbia) Laslo Djere (Argentina) Pedro Cachín	(Austria) Lukas Neumayer (Czech Republic) Michael Vrbenský (Moldova) Radu Albot (France) Kyrian Jacquet
June 3	UniCredit Czech Open; Prostějov, Czech Republic; Clay – Challenger 100 – 32S/24Q/16D; Singles – Doubles	Ivan Liutarevich (Spain) Sergio Martos Gornés; 6–1, 6–4	(Netherlands) Matwé Middelkoop (Austria) Philipp Oswald	(Serbia) Laslo Djere (Argentina) Pedro Cachín	(Austria) Lukas Neumayer (Czech Republic) Michael Vrbenský (Moldova) Radu Albot (France) Kyrian Jacquet
June 3	Tyler Tennis Championships; Tyler, United States; Hard – Challenger 75 – 32S/24Q/16D; Singles – Doubles	(Japan) James Trotter; 6–2, 7–6^{(7–3)}	(United States) Brandon Holt	(Canada) Liam Draxl (Hong Kong) Coleman Wong	(Canada) Alexis Galarneau (South Korea) Hong Seong-chan (Jordan) Abdullah Shelbayh (United States) Ethan Quinn
June 3	Tyler Tennis Championships; Tyler, United States; Hard – Challenger 75 – 32S/24Q/16D; Singles – Doubles	(Mexico) Hans Hach Verdugo (Japan) James Trotter; 7–6^{(7–3)}, 6–4	(Ecuador) Andrés Andrade (Jordan) Abdullah Shelbayh	(Canada) Liam Draxl (Hong Kong) Coleman Wong	(Canada) Alexis Galarneau (South Korea) Hong Seong-chan (Jordan) Abdullah Shelbayh (United States) Ethan Quinn
June 3	Zagreb Open; Zagreb, Croatia; Clay – Challenger 75 – 32S/24Q/16D; Singles – Doubles	(Bosnia and Herzegovina) Damir Džumhur; 7–5, 6–0	(Croatia) Luka Mikrut	(Spain) Oriol Roca Batalla (Croatia) Matej Dodig	(Dominican Republic) Nick Hardt (Italy) Enrico Dalla Valle (Kazakhstan) Dmitry Popko (Mexico) Rodrigo Pacheco Méndez
June 3	Zagreb Open; Zagreb, Croatia; Clay – Challenger 75 – 32S/24Q/16D; Singles – Doubles	(France) Jonathan Eysseric (France) Quentin Halys; 6–4, 6–4	(Romania) Alexandru Jecan (Portugal) Henrique Rocha	(Spain) Oriol Roca Batalla (Croatia) Matej Dodig	(Dominican Republic) Nick Hardt (Italy) Enrico Dalla Valle (Kazakhstan) Dmitry Popko (Mexico) Rodrigo Pacheco Méndez
June 3	Challenger Santa Fe; Santa Fe, Argentina; Clay – Challenger 50 – 32S/24Q/16D; Singles – Doubles	(Argentina) Andrea Collarini; 6–2, 6–3	(Argentina) Facundo Mena	(Argentina) Gonzalo Villanueva (United States) Ulises Blanch	(Brazil) Matheus Pucinelli de Almeida (Argentina) Tomás Farjat (United States) Trey Hilderbrand (Argentina) Lautaro Midón
June 3	Challenger Santa Fe; Santa Fe, Argentina; Clay – Challenger 50 – 32S/24Q/16D; Singles – Doubles	(Lebanon) Hady Habib (United States) Trey Hilderbrand; 6–7^{(5–7)}, 6–2, [10–4]	(Uruguay) Ignacio Carou (Argentina) Facundo Mena	(Argentina) Gonzalo Villanueva (United States) Ulises Blanch	(Brazil) Matheus Pucinelli de Almeida (Argentina) Tomás Farjat (United States) Trey Hilderbrand (Argentina) Lautaro Midón
June 10	Nottingham Open; Nottingham, United Kingdom; Grass – Challenger 125 – 32S/24Q/16D; Singles – Doubles	(United Kingdom) Jacob Fearnley; 4–6, 6–4, 6–3	(United Kingdom) Charles Broom	(Italy) Mattia Bellucci (United Kingdom) Billy Harris	(United Kingdom) Jack Pinnington Jones (China) Shang Juncheng (Kazakhstan) Mikhail Kukushkin (United Kingdom) Dan Evans
June 10	Nottingham Open; Nottingham, United Kingdom; Grass – Challenger 125 – 32S/24Q/16D; Singles – Doubles	(Australia) John Peers (United Kingdom) Marcus Willis; 6–1, 6–7^{(1–7)}, [10–7]	(France) Harold Mayot (Australia) Luke Saville	(Italy) Mattia Bellucci (United Kingdom) Billy Harris	(United Kingdom) Jack Pinnington Jones (China) Shang Juncheng (Kazakhstan) Mikhail Kukushkin (United Kingdom) Dan Evans
June 10	Internazionali di Tennis Città di Perugia; Perugia, Italy; Clay – Challenger 125 – 32S/24Q/16D; Singles – Doubles	(Italy) Luciano Darderi; 6–1, 6–2	(India) Sumit Nagal	(Germany) Daniel Altmaier (Spain) Bernabé Zapata Miralles	(Italy) Fabio Fognini (Italy) Francesco Passaro (Poland) Maks Kaśnikowski (Serbia) Laslo Djere
June 10	Internazionali di Tennis Città di Perugia; Perugia, Italy; Clay – Challenger 125 – 32S/24Q/16D; Singles – Doubles	(Argentina) Guido Andreozzi (Mexico) Miguel Ángel Reyes-Varela; 6–4, 7–5	(India) Sriram Balaji (Germany) Andre Begemann	(Germany) Daniel Altmaier (Spain) Bernabé Zapata Miralles	(Italy) Fabio Fognini (Italy) Francesco Passaro (Poland) Maks Kaśnikowski (Serbia) Laslo Djere
June 10	Bratislava Open; Bratislava, Slovakia; Clay – Challenger 100 – 32S/24Q/16D; Singles – Doubles	(Poland) Kamil Majchrzak; 6–0, 2–6, 6–3	(Portugal) Henrique Rocha	(Switzerland) Jérôme Kym (Slovakia) Jozef Kovalík	(Argentina) Pedro Cachín (Kazakhstan) Dmitry Popko (Spain) Martín Landaluce (Slovakia) Norbert Gombos
June 10	Bratislava Open; Bratislava, Slovakia; Clay – Challenger 100 – 32S/24Q/16D; Singles – Doubles	(Germany) Jakob Schnaitter (Germany) Mark Wallner; 6–4, 6–4	(Slovakia) Miloš Karol (Slovakia) Tomáš Lánik	(Switzerland) Jérôme Kym (Slovakia) Jozef Kovalík	(Argentina) Pedro Cachín (Kazakhstan) Dmitry Popko (Spain) Martín Landaluce (Slovakia) Norbert Gombos
June 10	Open Sopra Steria de Lyon; Lyon, France; Clay – Challenger 100 – 32S/24Q/16D; Singles – Doubles	(France) Hugo Gaston; 6–2, 1–6, 6–1	(France) Alexandre Müller	(France) Kyrian Jacquet (Belgium) Raphaël Collignon	(Georgia (country)) Nikoloz Basilashvili (France) Quentin Halys (France) Luca Van Assche (Romania) Filip Cristian Jianu
June 10	Open Sopra Steria de Lyon; Lyon, France; Clay – Challenger 100 – 32S/24Q/16D; Singles – Doubles	(France) Manuel Guinard (France) Grégoire Jacq; 4–6, 6–3, [10–6]	(Greece) Markos Kalovelonis (Ukraine) Vladyslav Orlov	(France) Kyrian Jacquet (Belgium) Raphaël Collignon	(Georgia (country)) Nikoloz Basilashvili (France) Quentin Halys (France) Luca Van Assche (Romania) Filip Cristian Jianu
June 10	Lima Challenger; Lima, Peru; Clay – Challenger 50 – 32S/24Q/16D; Singles – Doubles	(Argentina) Juan Manuel Cerúndolo; 6–4, 6–3	(Brazil) Pedro Boscardin Dias	(Argentina) Juan Bautista Torres (Argentina) Hernán Casanova	(Brazil) Matheus Pucinelli de Almeida (Argentina) Facundo Mena (Brazil) Karue Sell (Spain) Diego Augusto Barreto Sánchez
June 10	Lima Challenger; Lima, Peru; Clay – Challenger 50 – 32S/24Q/16D; Singles – Doubles	(Lebanon) Hady Habib (United States) Trey Hilderbrand; 7–5, 6–3	(Brazil) Pedro Boscardin Dias (Brazil) Pedro Sakamoto	(Argentina) Juan Bautista Torres (Argentina) Hernán Casanova	(Brazil) Matheus Pucinelli de Almeida (Argentina) Facundo Mena (Brazil) Karue Sell (Spain) Diego Augusto Barreto Sánchez
June 17	Ilkley Trophy; Ilkley, United Kingdom; Grass – Challenger 125 – 32S/24Q/16D; Singles – Doubles	(Belgium) David Goffin; 6–4, 6–2	(France) Harold Mayot	(United States) Zachary Svajda (France) Benjamin Bonzi	(Slovakia) Lukáš Klein (France) Térence Atmane (France) Titouan Droguet (South Africa) Lloyd Harris
June 17	Ilkley Trophy; Ilkley, United Kingdom; Grass – Challenger 125 – 32S/24Q/16D; Singles – Doubles	(United States) Evan King (United States) Reese Stalder; 6–3, 3–6, [10–6]	(United States) Christian Harrison (France) Fabrice Martin	(United States) Zachary Svajda (France) Benjamin Bonzi	(Slovakia) Lukáš Klein (France) Térence Atmane (France) Titouan Droguet (South Africa) Lloyd Harris
June 17	Emilia-Romagna Open; Sassuolo, Italy; Clay – Challenger 125 – 32S/24Q/16D; Singles – Doubles	(Netherlands) Jesper de Jong; 7–6^{(7–5)}, 6–1	(Germany) Daniel Altmaier	(Argentina) Federico Coria (Slovakia) Martin Kližan	(Italy) Marco Cecchinato (Italy) Riccardo Bonadio (United States) Tristan Boyer (Italy) Alexander Weis
June 17	Emilia-Romagna Open; Sassuolo, Italy; Clay – Challenger 125 – 32S/24Q/16D; Singles – Doubles	(Italy) Marco Bortolotti (Australia) Matthew Romios; 7–6^{(9–7)}, 2–6, [11–9]	(United States) Ryan Seggerman (United States) Patrik Trhac	(Argentina) Federico Coria (Slovakia) Martin Kližan	(Italy) Marco Cecchinato (Italy) Riccardo Bonadio (United States) Tristan Boyer (Italy) Alexander Weis
June 17	Poznań Open; Poznań, Poland; Clay – Challenger 75 – 32S/24Q/16D; Singles – Doubles	(Poland) Maks Kaśnikowski; 3–6, 6–4, 6–3	(Argentina) Camilo Ugo Carabelli	(Poland) Kamil Majchrzak (Argentina) Genaro Alberto Olivieri	(Czech Republic) Dalibor Svrčina (Italy) Samuel Vincent Ruggeri (Dominican Republic) Nick Hardt (Portugal) Gastão Elias
June 17	Poznań Open; Poznań, Poland; Clay – Challenger 75 – 32S/24Q/16D; Singles – Doubles	(Brazil) Orlando Luz (Brazil) Marcelo Zormann; 5–7, 6–2, [10–6]	(Germany) Jakob Schnaitter (Germany) Mark Wallner	(Poland) Kamil Majchrzak (Argentina) Genaro Alberto Olivieri	(Czech Republic) Dalibor Svrčina (Italy) Samuel Vincent Ruggeri (Dominican Republic) Nick Hardt (Portugal) Gastão Elias
June 17	Internationaux de Tennis de Blois; Blois, France; Clay – Challenger 50 – 32S/24Q/16D; Singles – Doubles	(Lithuania) Ričardas Berankis; 7–6^{(7–4)}, 7–5	(France) Calvin Hemery	Alibek Kachmazov (France) Jules Marie	(France) Corentin Denolly (Turkey) Ergi Kırkın (France) Florent Bax (France) Arthur Géa
June 17	Internationaux de Tennis de Blois; Blois, France; Clay – Challenger 50 – 32S/24Q/16D; Singles – Doubles	(Zimbabwe) Benjamin Lock (Zimbabwe) Courtney John Lock; 1–6, 6–3, [10–4]	(France) Corentin Denolly (France) Arthur Géa	Alibek Kachmazov (France) Jules Marie	(France) Corentin Denolly (Turkey) Ergi Kırkın (France) Florent Bax (France) Arthur Géa
June 17	Santa Cruz Challenger II; Santa Cruz de la Sierra, Bolivia; Clay – Challenger 50 – 32S/24Q/16D; Singles – Doubles	(Argentina) Juan Manuel Cerúndolo; 3–6, 6–1, 6–4	(Ecuador) Álvaro Guillén Meza	(Lebanon) Hady Habib (Argentina) Facundo Mena	(Brazil) Pedro Sakamoto (Bolivia) Juan Carlos Prado Ángelo (Argentina) Leonardo Aboian (United States) Garrett Johns
June 17	Santa Cruz Challenger II; Santa Cruz de la Sierra, Bolivia; Clay – Challenger 50 – 32S/24Q/16D; Singles – Doubles	(Lebanon) Hady Habib (United States) Trey Hilderbrand; 3–6, 6–3, [10–7]	(New Zealand) Finn Reynolds (Chile) Matías Soto	(Lebanon) Hady Habib (Argentina) Facundo Mena	(Brazil) Pedro Sakamoto (Bolivia) Juan Carlos Prado Ángelo (Argentina) Leonardo Aboian (United States) Garrett Johns
June 24	Aspria Tennis Cup; Milan, Italy; Clay – Challenger 75 – 32S/24Q/16D; Singles – Doubles	(Argentina) Federico Agustín Gómez; 6–3, 6–4	(Romania) Filip Cristian Jianu	(Italy) Samuel Vincent Ruggeri (Italy) Enrico Dalla Valle	Ivan Gakhov (Lithuania) Vilius Gaubas (Chinese Taipei) Tseng Chun-hsin (Denmark) Elmer Møller
June 24	Aspria Tennis Cup; Milan, Italy; Clay – Challenger 75 – 32S/24Q/16D; Singles – Doubles	(Germany) Andre Begemann (France) Jonathan Eysseric; 2–6, 6–4, [10–6]	(Czech Republic) Petr Nouza (Czech Republic) Patrik Rikl	(Italy) Samuel Vincent Ruggeri (Italy) Enrico Dalla Valle	Ivan Gakhov (Lithuania) Vilius Gaubas (Chinese Taipei) Tseng Chun-hsin (Denmark) Elmer Møller
June 24	Ibagué Open; Ibagué, Colombia; Clay – Challenger 50 – 32S/24Q/16D; Singles – Doubles	(Ecuador) Álvaro Guillén Meza; 6–0, 6–4	(Argentina) Facundo Mena	(Chile) Matías Soto (Colombia) Nicolás Mejía	(Argentina) Juan Bautista Torres (Lebanon) Hady Habib (Argentina) Valerio Aboian (Argentina) Tomás Farjat
June 24	Ibagué Open; Ibagué, Colombia; Clay – Challenger 50 – 32S/24Q/16D; Singles – Doubles	(New Zealand) Finn Reynolds (Chile) Matías Soto; 6–4, 4–6, [10–7]	(Argentina) Leonardo Aboian (Argentina) Valerio Aboian	(Chile) Matías Soto (Colombia) Nicolás Mejía	(Argentina) Juan Bautista Torres (Lebanon) Hady Habib (Argentina) Valerio Aboian (Argentina) Tomás Farjat

=== July ===
Week of	Tournament	Champions	Runners-up	Semifinalists	Quarterfinalists
July 1	Cranbrook Tennis Classic; Bloomfield Hills, United States; Hard – Challenger 75 – 32S/24Q/16D; Singles – Doubles	(United States) Learner Tien; 4–6, 6–3, 6–4	(United States) Nishesh Basavareddy	(United States) Stefan Kozlov (United States) Ryan Seggerman	(United States) J. J. Wolf (Australia) Bernard Tomic (Netherlands) Gijs Brouwer (Australia) Philip Sekulic
July 1	Cranbrook Tennis Classic; Bloomfield Hills, United States; Hard – Challenger 75 – 32S/24Q/16D; Singles – Doubles	(United States) Ryan Seggerman (United States) Patrik Trhac; 4–6, 6–3, [10–6]	(United States) Ozan Baris (United States) Nishesh Basavareddy	(United States) Stefan Kozlov (United States) Ryan Seggerman	(United States) J. J. Wolf (Australia) Bernard Tomic (Netherlands) Gijs Brouwer (Australia) Philip Sekulic
July 1	Ion Țiriac Challenger; Brașov, Romania; Clay – Challenger 75 – 32S/24Q/16D; Singles – Doubles	(Bolivia) Murkel Dellien; 6–3, 7–5	(Kazakhstan) Dmitry Popko	(Bosnia and Herzegovina) Nerman Fatić (United States) Nicolas Moreno de Alboran	(Romania) Radu Mihai Papoe (Romania) Cezar Crețu (Romania) Filip Cristian Jianu (Croatia) Matej Dodig
July 1	Ion Țiriac Challenger; Brașov, Romania; Clay – Challenger 75 – 32S/24Q/16D; Singles – Doubles	(Spain) Javier Barranco Cosano (United States) Nicolas Moreno de Alboran; 3–6, 6–1, [17–15]	(Poland) Karol Drzewiecki (Poland) Piotr Matuszewski	(Bosnia and Herzegovina) Nerman Fatić (United States) Nicolas Moreno de Alboran	(Romania) Radu Mihai Papoe (Romania) Cezar Crețu (Romania) Filip Cristian Jianu (Croatia) Matej Dodig
July 1	Tennis Open Karlsruhe; Karlsruhe, Germany; Clay – Challenger 75 – 32S/24Q/16D; Singles – Doubles	(Slovakia) Jozef Kovalík; 6–3, 7–6^{(7–2)}	(Argentina) Camilo Ugo Carabelli	(Hungary) Zsombor Piros (Germany) Daniel Masur	(Lithuania) Edas Butvilas (Bulgaria) Adrian Andreev (Lebanon) Benjamin Hassan (Germany) Rudolf Molleker
July 1	Tennis Open Karlsruhe; Karlsruhe, Germany; Clay – Challenger 75 – 32S/24Q/16D; Singles – Doubles	(Germany) Jakob Schnaitter (Germany) Mark Wallner; 6–4, 6–0	(France) Dan Added (France) Grégoire Jacq	(Hungary) Zsombor Piros (Germany) Daniel Masur	(Lithuania) Edas Butvilas (Bulgaria) Adrian Andreev (Lebanon) Benjamin Hassan (Germany) Rudolf Molleker
July 1	Modena Challenger; Modena, Italy; Clay – Challenger 75 – 32S/24Q/16D; Singles – Doubles	(Spain) Albert Ramos Viñolas; 6–4, 3–6, 6–2	(Italy) Federico Arnaboldi	(Chinese Taipei) Tseng Chun-hsin (Argentina) Andrea Collarini	(Italy) Marcello Serafini (Italy) Andrea Pellegrino (Spain) Oriol Roca Batalla (Peru) Juan Pablo Varillas
July 1	Modena Challenger; Modena, Italy; Clay – Challenger 75 – 32S/24Q/16D; Singles – Doubles	(France) Jonathan Eysseric (United States) George Goldhoff; 6–3, 3–6, [10–8]	(Germany) Andre Begemann (Finland) Patrik Niklas-Salminen	(Chinese Taipei) Tseng Chun-hsin (Argentina) Andrea Collarini	(Italy) Marcello Serafini (Italy) Andrea Pellegrino (Spain) Oriol Roca Batalla (Peru) Juan Pablo Varillas
July 1	Internationaux de Tennis de Troyes; Troyes, France; Clay – Challenger 50 – 32S/24Q/16D; Singles – Doubles	(France) Gabriel Debru; 6–3, 6–7^{(1–7)}, 7–5	(Kazakhstan) Timofey Skatov	(Italy) Lorenzo Giustino (France) Lilian Marmousez	Evgeny Karlovskiy (Czech Republic) Jonáš Forejtek (Austria) Neil Oberleitner (Spain) Martín Landaluce
July 1	Internationaux de Tennis de Troyes; Troyes, France; Clay – Challenger 50 – 32S/24Q/16D; Singles – Doubles	(Austria) Neil Oberleitner (Switzerland) Jakub Paul; 6–4, 7–6^{(7–1)}	(Uzbekistan) Denis Istomin; Evgeny Karlovskiy	(Italy) Lorenzo Giustino (France) Lilian Marmousez	Evgeny Karlovskiy (Czech Republic) Jonáš Forejtek (Austria) Neil Oberleitner (Spain) Martín Landaluce
July 8	Brawo Open; Braunschweig, Germany; Clay – Challenger 125 – 32S/24Q/16D; Singles – Doubles	(Spain) Roberto Carballés Baena; 6–1, 6–3	(Netherlands) Botic van de Zandschulp	(France) Pierre-Hugues Herbert (Argentina) Pedro Cachín	(Chile) Cristian Garín (Croatia) Duje Ajduković (Germany) Henri Squire (Colombia) Daniel Elahi Galán
July 8	Brawo Open; Braunschweig, Germany; Clay – Challenger 125 – 32S/24Q/16D; Singles – Doubles	(Netherlands) Sander Arends (Netherlands) Robin Haase; 4–6, 6–4, [10–8]	(India) Sriram Balaji (Ecuador) Gonzalo Escobar	(France) Pierre-Hugues Herbert (Argentina) Pedro Cachín	(Chile) Cristian Garín (Croatia) Duje Ajduković (Germany) Henri Squire (Colombia) Daniel Elahi Galán
July 8	Salzburg Open; Salzburg, Austria; Clay – Challenger 125 – 32S/24Q/16D; Singles – Doubles	(Switzerland) Alexander Ritschard; 6–4, 6–2	(France) Kyrian Jacquet	(Peru) Ignacio Buse (Brazil) Thiago Monteiro	(Argentina) Federico Coria (Serbia) Hamad Medjedovic (Spain) Alejandro Moro Cañas (Austria) Lukas Neumayer
July 8	Salzburg Open; Salzburg, Austria; Clay – Challenger 125 – 32S/24Q/16D; Singles – Doubles	(France) Manuel Guinard (France) Grégoire Jacq; 2–6, 6–3, [14–12]	(Czech Republic) Petr Nouza (Czech Republic) Patrik Rikl	(Peru) Ignacio Buse (Brazil) Thiago Monteiro	(Argentina) Federico Coria (Serbia) Hamad Medjedovic (Spain) Alejandro Moro Cañas (Austria) Lukas Neumayer
July 8	Iași Open; Iași, Romania; Clay – Challenger 100 – 32S/24Q/16D; Singles – Doubles	(Bolivia) Hugo Dellien; 6–1, 6–1	(Spain) Javier Barranco Cosano	(Paraguay) Daniel Vallejo (France) Enzo Couacaud	(France) Valentin Royer (Spain) Martín Landaluce (Kazakhstan) Dmitry Popko (Argentina) Juan Pablo Ficovich
July 8	Iași Open; Iași, Romania; Clay – Challenger 100 – 32S/24Q/16D; Singles – Doubles	(Romania) Cezar Crețu (Romania) Bogdan Pavel; 2–6, 6–2, [10–4]	(Poland) Karol Drzewiecki (Poland) Piotr Matuszewski	(Paraguay) Daniel Vallejo (France) Enzo Couacaud	(France) Valentin Royer (Spain) Martín Landaluce (Kazakhstan) Dmitry Popko (Argentina) Juan Pablo Ficovich
July 8	Internazionali di Tennis Città di Trieste; Trieste, Italy; Clay – Challenger 100 – 32S/24Q/16D; Singles – Doubles	(Argentina) Federico Agustín Gómez; 6–1, 6–2	(Chile) Tomás Barrios Vera	(Spain) Oriol Roca Batalla (Portugal) Henrique Rocha	(Bulgaria) Adrian Andreev (France) Titouan Droguet (Italy) Francesco Maestrelli (Italy) Enrico Dalla Valle
July 8	Internazionali di Tennis Città di Trieste; Trieste, Italy; Clay – Challenger 100 – 32S/24Q/16D; Singles – Doubles	(Italy) Marco Bortolotti (Australia) Matthew Romios; 6–2, 7–6^{(8–6)}	(Brazil) Daniel Dutra da Silva (Zimbabwe) Courtney John Lock	(Spain) Oriol Roca Batalla (Portugal) Henrique Rocha	(Bulgaria) Adrian Andreev (France) Titouan Droguet (Italy) Francesco Maestrelli (Italy) Enrico Dalla Valle
July 8	Winnipeg National Bank Challenger; Winnipeg, Canada; Hard – Challenger 75 – 32S/24Q/16D; Singles – Doubles	(France) Benjamin Bonzi; 5–7, 6–1, 6–4	(Japan) Sho Shimabukuro	(United States) Eliot Spizzirri (China) Bu Yunchaokete	(France) Hugo Grenier (Australia) Tristan Schoolkate (Japan) Yuta Shimizu (United States) Brandon Holt
July 8	Winnipeg National Bank Challenger; Winnipeg, Canada; Hard – Challenger 75 – 32S/24Q/16D; Singles – Doubles	(United States) Christian Harrison (United States) Cannon Kingsley; 6–1, 6–4	(Japan) Yuta Shimizu (Japan) Kaichi Uchida	(United States) Eliot Spizzirri (China) Bu Yunchaokete	(France) Hugo Grenier (Australia) Tristan Schoolkate (Japan) Yuta Shimizu (United States) Brandon Holt
July 15	Dutch Open; Amersfoort, Netherlands; Clay – Challenger 75 – 32S/24Q/16D; Singles – Doubles	(Chile) Tomás Barrios Vera; 6–2, 6–1	Alexey Zakharov	(Spain) Daniel Rincón (Netherlands) Max Houkes	(Ecuador) Álvaro Guillén Meza (Italy) Enrico Dalla Valle (Bolivia) Murkel Dellien (Spain) Bernabé Zapata Miralles
July 15	Dutch Open; Amersfoort, Netherlands; Clay – Challenger 75 – 32S/24Q/16D; Singles – Doubles	(Brazil) Marcelo Demoliner (Argentina) Guillermo Durán; 7–6^{(7–2)}, 6–4	(United Kingdom) Jay Clarke (United Kingdom) David Stevenson	(Spain) Daniel Rincón (Netherlands) Max Houkes	(Ecuador) Álvaro Guillén Meza (Italy) Enrico Dalla Valle (Bolivia) Murkel Dellien (Spain) Bernabé Zapata Miralles
July 15	Championnats de Granby; Granby, Canada; Hard – Challenger 75 – 32S/24Q/16D; Singles – Doubles	(China) Bu Yunchaokete; 6–3, 6–7^{(7–9)}, 6–4	(France) Térence Atmane	(France) Hugo Grenier (Japan) Yasutaka Uchiyama	(Ecuador) Andrés Andrade (United States) Bruno Kuzuhara (Japan) Sho Shimabukuro (Chinese Taipei) Wu Tung-lin
July 15	Championnats de Granby; Granby, Canada; Hard – Challenger 75 – 32S/24Q/16D; Singles – Doubles	(Ecuador) Andrés Andrade (United States) Mac Kiger; 3–6, 6–3, [10–2]	(Canada) Justin Boulais (Canada) Joshua Lapadat	(France) Hugo Grenier (Japan) Yasutaka Uchiyama	(Ecuador) Andrés Andrade (United States) Bruno Kuzuhara (Japan) Sho Shimabukuro (Chinese Taipei) Wu Tung-lin
July 15	President's Cup; Astana, Kazakhstan; Hard – Challenger 50 – 32S/24Q/16D; Singles – Doubles	(Bulgaria) Dimitar Kuzmanov; 6–4, 6–3	(Georgia (country)) Saba Purtseladze	(Georgia (country)) Aleksandre Bakshi; Evgeny Karlovskiy	(Uzbekistan) Sergey Fomin; Evgeny Donskoy (France) Antoine Ghibaudo (Slovakia) Lukáš Pokorný
July 15	President's Cup; Astana, Kazakhstan; Hard – Challenger 50 – 32S/24Q/16D; Singles – Doubles	Egor Agafonov; Ilia Simakin; 6–4, 6–3	(Uzbekistan) Denis Istomin; Evgeny Karlovskiy	(Georgia (country)) Aleksandre Bakshi; Evgeny Karlovskiy	(Uzbekistan) Sergey Fomin; Evgeny Donskoy (France) Antoine Ghibaudo (Slovakia) Lukáš Pokorný
July 15	Open de Tenis Ciudad de Pozoblanco; Pozoblanco, Spain; Hard – Challenger 50 – 32S/24Q/16D; Singles – Doubles	(Denmark) August Holmgren; 3–6, 6–3, 6–4	(France) Antoine Escoffier	(France) Robin Bertrand; Egor Gerasimov	(Spain) Alberto Barroso Campos (France) Laurent Lokoli (France) Dan Added (Spain) Miguel Damas
July 15	Open de Tenis Ciudad de Pozoblanco; Pozoblanco, Spain; Hard – Challenger 50 – 32S/24Q/16D; Singles – Doubles	(France) Dan Added (France) Arthur Reymond; 6–2, 6–4	(United Kingdom) Liam Hignett (United Kingdom) James MacKinlay	(France) Robin Bertrand; Egor Gerasimov	(Spain) Alberto Barroso Campos (France) Laurent Lokoli (France) Dan Added (Spain) Miguel Damas
July 22	Zug Open; Zug, Switzerland; Clay – Challenger 125 – 32S/24Q/16D; Singles – Doubles	(Switzerland) Jérôme Kym; 6–4, 6–4	(Argentina) Román Andrés Burruchaga	(Switzerland) Marc-Andrea Hüsler (Belgium) Joris De Loore	(Switzerland) Henry Bernet (Jordan) Abdullah Shelbayh (Germany) Marko Topo (France) Geoffrey Blancaneaux
July 22	Zug Open; Zug, Switzerland; Clay – Challenger 125 – 32S/24Q/16D; Singles – Doubles	(Austria) Jurij Rodionov (Ukraine) Volodymyr Uzhylovskyi; 7–6^{(7–5)}, 7–6^{(7–5)}	(Japan) Seita Watanabe (Japan) Takeru Yuzuki	(Switzerland) Marc-Andrea Hüsler (Belgium) Joris De Loore	(Switzerland) Henry Bernet (Jordan) Abdullah Shelbayh (Germany) Marko Topo (France) Geoffrey Blancaneaux
July 22	Internazionali di Tennis Città di Verona; Verona, Italy; Clay – Challenger 100 – 32S/24Q/16D; Singles – Doubles	(Italy) Federico Arnaboldi; 6–2, 6–2	(Lithuania) Vilius Gaubas	(Germany) Max Hans Rehberg (Georgia (country)) Nikoloz Basilashvili	(Ecuador) Álvaro Guillén Meza (Peru) Gonzalo Bueno (Bolivia) Hugo Dellien (Netherlands) Jesper de Jong
July 22	Internazionali di Tennis Città di Verona; Verona, Italy; Clay – Challenger 100 – 32S/24Q/16D; Singles – Doubles	(Brazil) Marcelo Demoliner (Argentina) Guillermo Durán; 6–7^{(6–8)}, 7–6^{(7–3)}, [15–13]	(Bulgaria) Yanaki Milev (Bulgaria) Petr Nesterov	(Germany) Max Hans Rehberg (Georgia (country)) Nikoloz Basilashvili	(Ecuador) Álvaro Guillén Meza (Peru) Gonzalo Bueno (Bolivia) Hugo Dellien (Netherlands) Jesper de Jong
July 22	Chicago Men's Challenger; Chicago, United States; Hard – Challenger 75 – 32S/24Q/16D; Singles – Doubles	(Canada) Gabriel Diallo; 6–3, 7–6^{(7–3)}	(China) Bu Yunchaokete	(United Kingdom) Jacob Fearnley (United States) Learner Tien	(United States) Brandon Holt (United States) Mitchell Krueger (France) Hugo Grenier (South Korea) Hong Seong-chan
July 22	Chicago Men's Challenger; Chicago, United States; Hard – Challenger 75 – 32S/24Q/16D; Singles – Doubles	(Australia) Luke Saville (Australia) Li Tu; 6–4, 3–6, [10–3]	(United States) Mac Kiger (Canada) Benjamin Sigouin	(United Kingdom) Jacob Fearnley (United States) Learner Tien	(United States) Brandon Holt (United States) Mitchell Krueger (France) Hugo Grenier (South Korea) Hong Seong-chan
July 22	Tampere Open; Tampere, Finland; Clay – Challenger 75 – 32S/24Q/16D; Singles – Doubles	(Spain) Daniel Rincón; 6–1, 7–6^{(7–4)}	(France) Calvin Hemery	(Spain) Javier Barranco Cosano (Romania) Gabi Adrian Boitan	(Argentina) Francisco Comesaña (Germany) Marvin Möller (Tunisia) Aziz Dougaz (Spain) Carlos Taberner
July 22	Tampere Open; Tampere, Finland; Clay – Challenger 75 – 32S/24Q/16D; Singles – Doubles	(Spain) Íñigo Cervantes (Spain) Daniel Rincón; 6–3, 6–4	(Australia) Thomas Fancutt (Denmark) Johannes Ingildsen	(Spain) Javier Barranco Cosano (Romania) Gabi Adrian Boitan	(Argentina) Francisco Comesaña (Germany) Marvin Möller (Tunisia) Aziz Dougaz (Spain) Carlos Taberner
July 22	Open Castilla y León; Segovia, Spain; Hard – Challenger 50 – 32S/24Q/16D; Singles – Doubles	(France) Antoine Escoffier; 6–3, 2–6, 6–3	(Spain) Àlex Martínez	(China) Cui Jie (Spain) Nicolás Álvarez Varona	(Zimbabwe) Benjamin Lock (Germany) Max Wiskandt (France) Dan Added (Spain) Mario González Fernández
July 22	Open Castilla y León; Segovia, Spain; Hard – Challenger 50 – 32S/24Q/16D; Singles – Doubles	(France) Dan Added (France) Arthur Reymond; 6–4, 6–3	(Bulgaria) Alexander Donski (Portugal) Tiago Pereira	(China) Cui Jie (Spain) Nicolás Álvarez Varona	(Zimbabwe) Benjamin Lock (Germany) Max Wiskandt (France) Dan Added (Spain) Mario González Fernández
July 29	Porto Open; Porto, Portugal; Hard – Challenger 125 – 32S/24Q/16D; Singles – Doubles	(Denmark) August Holmgren; 7–6^{(7–3)}, 7–6^{(8–6)}	(Spain) Alejandro Moro Cañas	(Portugal) Jaime Faria (Kazakhstan) Mikhail Kukushkin	(Lithuania) Edas Butvilas (Ukraine) Vadym Ursu (Spain) Àlex Martínez (France) Arthur Reymond
July 29	Porto Open; Porto, Portugal; Hard – Challenger 125 – 32S/24Q/16D; Singles – Doubles	(Netherlands) Sander Arends (United Kingdom) Luke Johnson; 6–3, 6–2	(United Kingdom) Joshua Paris (India) Ramkumar Ramanathan	(Portugal) Jaime Faria (Kazakhstan) Mikhail Kukushkin	(Lithuania) Edas Butvilas (Ukraine) Vadym Ursu (Spain) Àlex Martínez (France) Arthur Reymond
July 29	San Marino Open; San Marino, San Marino; Clay – Challenger 125 – 32S/24Q/16D; Singles – Doubles	(France) Alexandre Müller; 6–3, 4–6, 7–6^{(7–3)}	(Chinese Taipei) Tseng Chun-hsin	(Italy) Fabio Fognini (Argentina) Francisco Comesaña	(Italy) Matteo Gigante (Argentina) Juan Manuel Cerúndolo (Brazil) Gustavo Heide (Italy) Andrea Pellegrino
July 29	San Marino Open; San Marino, San Marino; Clay – Challenger 125 – 32S/24Q/16D; Singles – Doubles	(Czech Republic) Petr Nouza (Czech Republic) Patrik Rikl; 1–6, 7–5, [10–6]	(France) Théo Arribagé (Brazil) Orlando Luz	(Italy) Fabio Fognini (Argentina) Francisco Comesaña	(Italy) Matteo Gigante (Argentina) Juan Manuel Cerúndolo (Brazil) Gustavo Heide (Italy) Andrea Pellegrino
July 29	Platzmann-Sauerland Open; Lüdenscheid, Germany; Clay – Challenger 100 – 32S/24Q/16D; Singles – Doubles	(Belgium) Raphaël Collignon; 3–6, 6–4, 6–3	(Netherlands) Botic van de Zandschulp	(France) Titouan Droguet (Poland) Kamil Majchrzak	(Germany) Henri Squire (Spain) Oriol Roca Batalla (Argentina) Román Andrés Burruchaga (France) Clément Tabur
July 29	Platzmann-Sauerland Open; Lüdenscheid, Germany; Clay – Challenger 100 – 32S/24Q/16D; Singles – Doubles	(Netherlands) David Pel (Netherlands) Bart Stevens; 6–4, 2–6, [10–8]	(Netherlands) Matwé Middelkoop (Ukraine) Denys Molchanov	(France) Titouan Droguet (Poland) Kamil Majchrzak	(Germany) Henri Squire (Spain) Oriol Roca Batalla (Argentina) Román Andrés Burruchaga (France) Clément Tabur
July 29	Lexington Challenger; Lexington, United States; Hard – Challenger 75 – 32S/24Q/16D; Singles – Doubles	(Brazil) João Fonseca; 6–1, 6–4	(Australia) Li Tu	(France) Hugo Grenier (Hong Kong) Coleman Wong	(United States) Learner Tien (Canada) Gabriel Diallo (United States) Micah Braswell (United States) Emilio Nava
July 29	Lexington Challenger; Lexington, United States; Hard – Challenger 75 – 32S/24Q/16D; Singles – Doubles	(Sweden) André Göransson (Netherlands) Sem Verbeek; 6–4, 6–3	(Japan) Yuta Shimizu (Japan) James Trotter	(France) Hugo Grenier (Hong Kong) Coleman Wong	(United States) Learner Tien (Canada) Gabriel Diallo (United States) Micah Braswell (United States) Emilio Nava
July 29	Svijany Open; Liberec, Czech Republic; Clay – Challenger 75 – 32S/24Q/16D; Singles – Doubles	(Bolivia) Hugo Dellien; 5–7, 6–4, 6–1	(Denmark) Elmer Møller	(France) Manuel Guinard (United States) Nicolas Moreno de Alboran	(Ukraine) Vitaliy Sachko (Czech Republic) Michael Vrbenský (Czech Republic) Andrew Paulson (France) Geoffrey Blancaneaux
July 29	Svijany Open; Liberec, Czech Republic; Clay – Challenger 75 – 32S/24Q/16D; Singles – Doubles	(Czech Republic) Jonáš Forejtek (Czech Republic) Michael Vrbenský; 7–5, 6–7^{(5–7)}, [10–4]	(Slovakia) Miloš Karol (Slovakia) Tomáš Lánik	(France) Manuel Guinard (United States) Nicolas Moreno de Alboran	(Ukraine) Vitaliy Sachko (Czech Republic) Michael Vrbenský (Czech Republic) Andrew Paulson (France) Geoffrey Blancaneaux

=== August ===
Week of	Tournament	Champions	Runners-up	Semifinalists	Quarterfinalists
August 5	Open Bogotá; Bogotá, Colombia; Clay – Challenger 75 – 32S/24Q/16D; Singles – Doubles	(Argentina) Facundo Mena; 6–4, 7–5	(Brazil) Mateus Alves	(Colombia) Nicolás Mejía (Brazil) Karue Sell	(Australia) Bernard Tomic (Kazakhstan) Dmitry Popko (Argentina) Juan Pablo Ficovich (Argentina) Facundo Bagnis
August 5	Open Bogotá; Bogotá, Colombia; Clay – Challenger 75 – 32S/24Q/16D; Singles – Doubles	(New Zealand) Finn Reynolds (Chile) Matías Soto; 6–3, 6–4	(Zimbabwe) Benjamin Lock (Brazil) João Lucas Reis da Silva	(Colombia) Nicolás Mejía (Brazil) Karue Sell	(Australia) Bernard Tomic (Kazakhstan) Dmitry Popko (Argentina) Juan Pablo Ficovich (Argentina) Facundo Bagnis
August 5	Lincoln Challenger; Lincoln, United States; Hard – Challenger 75 – 32S/24Q/16D; Singles – Doubles	(United Kingdom) Jacob Fearnley; 6–4, 6–2	(Hong Kong) Coleman Wong	(China) Bu Yunchaokete (United States) Nishesh Basavareddy	(United States) Aidan Mayo (Australia) Tristan Schoolkate (United Kingdom) Paul Jubb (Australia) Li Tu
August 5	Lincoln Challenger; Lincoln, United States; Hard – Challenger 75 – 32S/24Q/16D; Singles – Doubles	(United States) Robert Cash (United States) JJ Tracy; 7–6^{(8–6)}, 6–3	(Uruguay) Ariel Behar (United Kingdom) Luke Johnson	(China) Bu Yunchaokete (United States) Nishesh Basavareddy	(United States) Aidan Mayo (Australia) Tristan Schoolkate (United Kingdom) Paul Jubb (Australia) Li Tu
August 5	Bonn Open; Bonn, Germany; Clay – Challenger 75 – 32S/24Q/16D; Singles – Doubles	(Bolivia) Hugo Dellien; 7–6^{(7–2)}, 6–0	(Germany) Maximilian Marterer	(Spain) Martín Landaluce (Lebanon) Benjamin Hassan	(United Kingdom) Jan Choinski (France) Calvin Hemery (Czech Republic) Dalibor Svrčina (Germany) Henri Squire
August 5	Bonn Open; Bonn, Germany; Clay – Challenger 75 – 32S/24Q/16D; Singles – Doubles	(France) Théo Arribagé (Brazil) Orlando Luz; 6–2, 6–4	(India) Jeevan Nedunchezhiyan (India) Vijay Sundar Prashanth	(Spain) Martín Landaluce (Lebanon) Benjamin Hassan	(United Kingdom) Jan Choinski (France) Calvin Hemery (Czech Republic) Dalibor Svrčina (Germany) Henri Squire
August 5	Internazionali di Tennis del Friuli Venezia Giulia; Cordenons, Italy; Clay – Challenger 75 – 32S/24Q/16D; Singles – Doubles	(Lithuania) Vilius Gaubas; 2–6, 6–2, 6–4	(Spain) Carlos Taberner	(Czech Republic) Andrew Paulson (Belgium) Alexander Blockx	(Argentina) Andrea Collarini (Italy) Lorenzo Giustino (Italy) Federico Arnaboldi (Italy) Riccardo Bonadio
August 5	Internazionali di Tennis del Friuli Venezia Giulia; Cordenons, Italy; Clay – Challenger 75 – 32S/24Q/16D; Singles – Doubles	(Italy) Marco Bortolotti (Australia) Matthew Romios; Walkover	(Czech Republic) Jiří Barnat (Czech Republic) Andrew Paulson	(Czech Republic) Andrew Paulson (Belgium) Alexander Blockx	(Argentina) Andrea Collarini (Italy) Lorenzo Giustino (Italy) Federico Arnaboldi (Italy) Riccardo Bonadio
August 12	RD Open; Santo Domingo, Dominican Republic; Clay – Challenger 125 – 32S/24Q/16D; Singles – Doubles	(Bosnia and Herzegovina) Damir Džumhur; 6–4, 6–4	(Ecuador) Andrés Andrade	(Serbia) Laslo Djere (Argentina) Renzo Olivo	(Australia) Bernard Tomic (United States) Ryan Seggerman (Chinese Taipei) Tseng Chun-hsin (Brazil) Felipe Meligeni Alves
August 12	RD Open; Santo Domingo, Dominican Republic; Clay – Challenger 125 – 32S/24Q/16D; Singles – Doubles	(Ecuador) Diego Hidalgo (Mexico) Miguel Ángel Reyes-Varela; 6–7^{(2–7)}, 6–4, [18–16]	(India) Sriram Balaji (Brazil) Fernando Romboli	(Serbia) Laslo Djere (Argentina) Renzo Olivo	(Australia) Bernard Tomic (United States) Ryan Seggerman (Chinese Taipei) Tseng Chun-hsin (Brazil) Felipe Meligeni Alves
August 12	Cary Tennis Classic; Cary, United States; Hard – Challenger 100 – 32S/24Q/16D; Singles – Doubles	Roman Safiullin; 1–6, 7–5, 7–5	(Italy) Mattia Bellucci	(Belgium) David Goffin (Canada) Gabriel Diallo	(United States) Christopher Eubanks (Finland) Otto Virtanen (Kazakhstan) Mikhail Kukushkin (United States) Tristan Boyer
August 12	Cary Tennis Classic; Cary, United States; Hard – Challenger 100 – 32S/24Q/16D; Singles – Doubles	(Australia) John Peers (Australia) John-Patrick Smith; Walkover	(Argentina) Federico Agustín Gómez (Greece) Petros Tsitsipas	(Belgium) David Goffin (Canada) Gabriel Diallo	(United States) Christopher Eubanks (Finland) Otto Virtanen (Kazakhstan) Mikhail Kukushkin (United States) Tristan Boyer
August 12	Kozerki Open; Grodzisk Mazowiecki, Poland; Hard – Challenger 100 – 32S/24Q/16D; Singles – Doubles	(Switzerland) Marc-Andrea Hüsler; 6–1, 6–4	(Czech Republic) Vít Kopřiva	(Syria) Hazem Naw (France) Antoine Escoffier	(Slovakia) Norbert Gombos (France) Manuel Guinard (Switzerland) Dominic Stricker (France) Laurent Lokoli
August 12	Kozerki Open; Grodzisk Mazowiecki, Poland; Hard – Challenger 100 – 32S/24Q/16D; Singles – Doubles	(United Kingdom) Charles Broom (United Kingdom) David Stevenson; 6–3, 7–6^{(7–3)}	(Israel) Daniel Cukierman (Denmark) Johannes Ingildsen	(Syria) Hazem Naw (France) Antoine Escoffier	(Slovakia) Norbert Gombos (France) Manuel Guinard (Switzerland) Dominic Stricker (France) Laurent Lokoli
August 12	Internazionali di Tennis Città di Todi; Todi, Italy; Clay – Challenger 75 – 32S/24Q/16D; Singles – Doubles	(Spain) Carlos Taberner; 6–4, 6–3	(Argentina) Santiago Rodríguez Taverna	(Italy) Stefano Travaglia (Romania) Cezar Crețu	(Portugal) Gastão Elias (France) Luka Pavlovic (Italy) Facundo Juárez (Italy) Lorenzo Giustino
August 12	Internazionali di Tennis Città di Todi; Todi, Italy; Clay – Challenger 75 – 32S/24Q/16D; Singles – Doubles	(Serbia) Ivan Sabanov (Serbia) Matej Sabanov; 6–4, 7–6^{(7–3)}	(Sweden) Filip Bergevi (Netherlands) Mick Veldheer	(Italy) Stefano Travaglia (Romania) Cezar Crețu	(Portugal) Gastão Elias (France) Luka Pavlovic (Italy) Facundo Juárez (Italy) Lorenzo Giustino
August 19	Dobrich Challenger; Dobrich, Bulgaria; Clay – Challenger 50 – 32S/24Q/16D; Singles – Doubles	(Argentina) Juan Bautista Torres; 5–7, 6–0, 7–5	Ivan Gakhov	(France) Arthur Géa (Lebanon) Hady Habib	(Turkey) Ergi Kırkın (Germany) Christoph Negritu (Bulgaria) Petr Nesterov (Argentina) Luciano Emanuel Ambrogi
August 19	Dobrich Challenger; Dobrich, Bulgaria; Clay – Challenger 50 – 32S/24Q/16D; Singles – Doubles	(Peru) Alexander Merino (Germany) Christoph Negritu; 6–4, 6–2	(Romania) Victor Vlad Cornea (Turkey) Ergi Kırkın	(France) Arthur Géa (Lebanon) Hady Habib	(Turkey) Ergi Kırkın (Germany) Christoph Negritu (Bulgaria) Petr Nesterov (Argentina) Luciano Emanuel Ambrogi
August 19	Jinan Open; Jinan, China; Hard – Challenger 50 – 32S/24Q/16D; Singles – Doubles	(China) Wu Yibing; 7–5, 6–3	(Japan) Rio Noguchi	(Japan) Yuta Shimizu (United States) Keegan Smith	(South Africa) Philip Henning (South Korea) Shin Woo-bin (China) Sun Fajing (China) Mo Yecong
August 19	Jinan Open; Jinan, China; Hard – Challenger 50 – 32S/24Q/16D; Singles – Doubles	(South Korea) Chung Yun-seong (Japan) Yuta Shimizu; 6–3, 6–7^{(5–7)}, [10–6]	(Japan) Rio Noguchi (Australia) Edward Winter	(Japan) Yuta Shimizu (United States) Keegan Smith	(South Africa) Philip Henning (South Korea) Shin Woo-bin (China) Sun Fajing (China) Mo Yecong
August 26	Città di Como Challenger; Como, Italy; Clay – Challenger 75 – 32S/24Q/16D; Singles – Doubles	(France) Gabriel Debru; 6–1, 2–6, 6–3	(Peru) Ignacio Buse	(Italy) Stefano Travaglia (Slovakia) Alex Molčan	(Japan) Kei Nishikori (Argentina) Genaro Alberto Olivieri (Hungary) Zsombor Piros (Argentina) Valerio Aboian
August 26	Città di Como Challenger; Como, Italy; Clay – Challenger 75 – 32S/24Q/16D; Singles – Doubles	(Romania) Victor Vlad Cornea (Ukraine) Denys Molchanov; 6–2, 6–3	(Romania) Alexandru Jecan; Ivan Liutarevich	(Italy) Stefano Travaglia (Slovakia) Alex Molčan	(Japan) Kei Nishikori (Argentina) Genaro Alberto Olivieri (Hungary) Zsombor Piros (Argentina) Valerio Aboian
August 26	Rafa Nadal Open; Mallorca, Spain; Hard – Challenger 75 – 32S/24Q/16D; Singles – Doubles	(Croatia) Duje Ajduković; 4–6, 6–3, 6–4	(Italy) Matteo Gigante	(Uzbekistan) Khumoyun Sultanov (Switzerland) Jérôme Kym	(Jordan) Abdullah Shelbayh (Switzerland) Marc-Andrea Hüsler (France) Enzo Couacaud (Lithuania) Ričardas Berankis
August 26	Rafa Nadal Open; Mallorca, Spain; Hard – Challenger 75 – 32S/24Q/16D; Singles – Doubles	(Austria) David Pichler (Austria) Jurij Rodionov; 1–6, 6–3, [10–7]	(India) Anirudh Chandrasekar (Spain) David Vega Hernández	(Uzbekistan) Khumoyun Sultanov (Switzerland) Jérôme Kym	(Jordan) Abdullah Shelbayh (Switzerland) Marc-Andrea Hüsler (France) Enzo Couacaud (Lithuania) Ričardas Berankis
August 26	Clube Tenis Porto Challenger; Porto, Portugal; Clay – Challenger 75 – 32S/24Q/16D; Singles – Doubles	(Bulgaria) Adrian Andreev; 6–3, 6–0	(Spain) Carlos Taberner	(Spain) Nikolás Sánchez Izquierdo (Argentina) Santiago Rodríguez Taverna	(Israel) Daniel Cukierman (Germany) Daniel Masur (Croatia) Dino Prižmić (Italy) Enrico Dalla Valle
August 26	Clube Tenis Porto Challenger; Porto, Portugal; Clay – Challenger 75 – 32S/24Q/16D; Singles – Doubles	(Israel) Daniel Cukierman (Poland) Piotr Matuszewski; 6–4, 6–0	(Monaco) Romain Arneodo (France) Théo Arribagé	(Spain) Nikolás Sánchez Izquierdo (Argentina) Santiago Rodríguez Taverna	(Israel) Daniel Cukierman (Germany) Daniel Masur (Croatia) Dino Prižmić (Italy) Enrico Dalla Valle
August 26	International Challenger Zhangjiagang; Zhangjiagang, China; Hard – Challenger 75 – 32S/24Q/16D; Singles – Doubles	(Japan) Yasutaka Uchiyama; 6–7^{(4–7)}, 6–2, 6–2	(Estonia) Mark Lajal	(Slovakia) Norbert Gombos (South Korea) Hong Seong-chan	(Czech Republic) Dalibor Svrčina (Japan) Rio Noguchi (Chinese Taipei) Wu Tung-lin (China) Sun Fajing
August 26	International Challenger Zhangjiagang; Zhangjiagang, China; Hard – Challenger 75 – 32S/24Q/16D; Singles – Doubles	(Japan) Kaichi Uchida (Japan) Takeru Yuzuki; 6–1, 7–5	(Philippines) Francis Alcantara (Thailand) Pruchya Isaro	(Slovakia) Norbert Gombos (South Korea) Hong Seong-chan	(Czech Republic) Dalibor Svrčina (Japan) Rio Noguchi (Chinese Taipei) Wu Tung-lin (China) Sun Fajing

=== September ===
Week of	Tournament	Champions	Runners-up	Semifinalists	Quarterfinalists
September 2	AON Open Challenger; Genoa, Italy; Clay – Challenger 125 – 32S/24Q/16D; Singles – Doubles	(Italy) Francesco Passaro; 7–5, 6–3	(Spain) Jaume Munar	(Italy) Stefano Travaglia (Peru) Ignacio Buse	(Croatia) Mili Poljičak (Japan) Kei Nishikori (Italy) Giovanni Fonio (Brazil) Thiago Monteiro
September 2	AON Open Challenger; Genoa, Italy; Clay – Challenger 125 – 32S/24Q/16D; Singles – Doubles	(Lebanon) Benjamin Hassan (Spain) David Vega Hernández; 6–4, 7–5	(Monaco) Romain Arneodo (France) Théo Arribagé	(Italy) Stefano Travaglia (Peru) Ignacio Buse	(Croatia) Mili Poljičak (Japan) Kei Nishikori (Italy) Giovanni Fonio (Brazil) Thiago Monteiro
September 2	Copa Sevilla; Seville, Spain; Clay – Challenger 125 – 32S/24Q/16D; Singles – Doubles	(Spain) Roberto Carballés Baena; 6–3, 7–5	(Germany) Daniel Altmaier	(France) Calvin Hemery (Switzerland) Alexander Ritschard	(Spain) Oriol Roca Batalla (Spain) Albert Ramos Viñolas (Argentina) Santiago Rodríguez Taverna (Spain) David Jordà Sanchis
September 2	Copa Sevilla; Seville, Spain; Clay – Challenger 125 – 32S/24Q/16D; Singles – Doubles	(Czech Republic) Petr Nouza (Czech Republic) Patrik Rikl; 6–3, 6–2	(United States) George Goldhoff (Brazil) Fernando Romboli	(France) Calvin Hemery (Switzerland) Alexander Ritschard	(Spain) Oriol Roca Batalla (Spain) Albert Ramos Viñolas (Argentina) Santiago Rodríguez Taverna (Spain) David Jordà Sanchis
September 2	Shanghai Challenger; Shanghai, China; Hard – Challenger 100 – 32S/24Q/16D; Singles – Doubles	(Japan) Sho Shimabukuro; 6–4, 6–4	(Chinese Taipei) Hsu Yu-hsiou	(Slovakia) Norbert Gombos (Hong Kong) Coleman Wong	(South Africa) Kris van Wyk; Alibek Kachmazov (Kazakhstan) Beibit Zhukayev (Czech Republic) Dalibor Svrčina
September 2	Shanghai Challenger; Shanghai, China; Hard – Challenger 100 – 32S/24Q/16D; Singles – Doubles	(Colombia) Cristian Rodríguez (Australia) Matthew Romios; 7–6^{(7–4)}, 1–6, [10–7]	(India) Rithvik Choudary Bollipalli (India) Arjun Kadhe	(Slovakia) Norbert Gombos (Hong Kong) Coleman Wong	(South Africa) Kris van Wyk; Alibek Kachmazov (Kazakhstan) Beibit Zhukayev (Czech Republic) Dalibor Svrčina
September 2	NÖ Open; Tulln, Austria; Clay – Challenger 100 – 32S/24Q/16D; Singles – Doubles	(United Kingdom) Jan Choinski; 6–4, 6–1	(Austria) Lukas Neumayer	(Czech Republic) Jakub Nicod (Germany) Rudolf Molleker	(Germany) Max Hans Rehberg; Ivan Gakhov (Czech Republic) Andrew Paulson (Switzerland) Jérôme Kym
September 2	NÖ Open; Tulln, Austria; Clay – Challenger 100 – 32S/24Q/16D; Singles – Doubles	(Slovakia) Miloš Karol (Ukraine) Vitaliy Sachko; 6–4, 2–6, [11–9]	(Poland) Karol Drzewiecki (Poland) Piotr Matuszewski	(Czech Republic) Jakub Nicod (Germany) Rudolf Molleker	(Germany) Max Hans Rehberg; Ivan Gakhov (Czech Republic) Andrew Paulson (Switzerland) Jérôme Kym
September 2	Cassis Open Provence; Cassis, France; Hard – Challenger 75 – 32S/24Q/16D; Singles – Doubles	(France) Richard Gasquet; 3–6, 6–1, 6–2	(Austria) Jurij Rodionov	(Portugal) Henrique Rocha (Colombia) Adrià Soriano Barrera	(France) Robin Bertrand (France) Laurent Lokoli (France) Titouan Droguet (Croatia) Marin Čilić
September 2	Cassis Open Provence; Cassis, France; Hard – Challenger 75 – 32S/24Q/16D; Singles – Doubles	(Portugal) Jaime Faria (Portugal) Henrique Rocha; 7–6^{(7–5)}, 6–4	(France) Manuel Guinard (France) Matteo Martineau	(Portugal) Henrique Rocha (Colombia) Adrià Soriano Barrera	(France) Robin Bertrand (France) Laurent Lokoli (France) Titouan Droguet (Croatia) Marin Čilić
September 2	Istanbul Challenger; Istanbul, Türkiye; Hard – Challenger 75 – 32S/24Q/16D; Singles – Doubles	(Bosnia and Herzegovina) Damir Džumhur; 6–4, 6–2	(Serbia) Hamad Medjedovic	(Netherlands) Jesper de Jong (Spain) Martín Landaluce	(United Kingdom) Jack Pinnington Jones; Ilia Simakin (Croatia) Matej Dodig (Denmark) Elmer Møller
September 2	Istanbul Challenger; Istanbul, Türkiye; Hard – Challenger 75 – 32S/24Q/16D; Singles – Doubles	(Georgia (country)) Aleksandre Bakshi (Turkey) Yankı Erel; 7–6^{(7–4)}, 7–5	(Denmark) August Holmgren (Denmark) Johannes Ingildsen	(Netherlands) Jesper de Jong (Spain) Martín Landaluce	(United Kingdom) Jack Pinnington Jones; Ilia Simakin (Croatia) Matej Dodig (Denmark) Elmer Møller
September 9	Szczecin Open; Szczecin, Poland; Clay – Challenger 125 – 32S/24Q/16D; Singles – Doubles	(Czech Republic) Vít Kopřiva; 7–5, 6–2	(Italy) Andrea Pellegrino	(South Korea) Gerard Campaña Lee (Argentina) Federico Coria	(Germany) Rudolf Molleker (Germany) Daniel Altmaier; Alexey Vatutin (Italy) Jacopo Berrettini
September 9	Szczecin Open; Szczecin, Poland; Clay – Challenger 125 – 32S/24Q/16D; Singles – Doubles	(Argentina) Guido Andreozzi (France) Théo Arribagé; 6–2, 6–1	(United States) Ryan Seggerman (Poland) Szymon Walków	(South Korea) Gerard Campaña Lee (Argentina) Federico Coria	(Germany) Rudolf Molleker (Germany) Daniel Altmaier; Alexey Vatutin (Italy) Jacopo Berrettini
September 9	Guangzhou Huangpu International Tennis Open; Guangzhou, China; Hard – Challenger 100 – 32S/24Q/16D; Singles – Doubles	(Australia) Christopher O'Connell; 1–6, 7–5, 7–6^{(7–5)}	(Japan) Sho Shimabukuro	(Kazakhstan) Mikhail Kukushkin (Italy) Luca Nardi	(Moldova) Radu Albot (Argentina) Federico Agustín Gómez (France) Térence Atmane (Australia) Marc Polmans
September 9	Guangzhou Huangpu International Tennis Open; Guangzhou, China; Hard – Challenger 100 – 32S/24Q/16D; Singles – Doubles	(United States) Evan King (United States) Reese Stalder; 4–6, 7–5, [10–5]	(Philippines) Francis Alcantara (Thailand) Pruchya Isaro	(Kazakhstan) Mikhail Kukushkin (Italy) Luca Nardi	(Moldova) Radu Albot (Argentina) Federico Agustín Gómez (France) Térence Atmane (Australia) Marc Polmans
September 9	Open de Rennes; Rennes, France; Hard (i) – Challenger 100 – 32S/24Q/16D; Singles – Doubles	(United Kingdom) Jacob Fearnley; 0–6, 7–6^{(7–5)}, 6–3	(France) Quentin Halys	(France) Harold Mayot (France) Constant Lestienne	(France) Adrian Mannarino (Belgium) Michael Geerts (France) Titouan Droguet (France) Lucas Pouille
September 9	Open de Rennes; Rennes, France; Hard (i) – Challenger 100 – 32S/24Q/16D; Singles – Doubles	(Netherlands) Sander Arends (France) Grégoire Jacq; 6–4, 6–2	(France) Antoine Escoffier (United Kingdom) Joshua Paris	(France) Harold Mayot (France) Constant Lestienne	(France) Adrian Mannarino (Belgium) Michael Geerts (France) Titouan Droguet (France) Lucas Pouille
September 9	Las Vegas Challenger; Las Vegas, United States; Hard – Challenger 75 – 32S/24Q/16D; Singles – Doubles	(United States) Learner Tien; 7–5, 1–6, 6–3	(United States) Tristan Boyer	(Brazil) Karue Sell (Jordan) Abdullah Shelbayh	(United States) Andres Martin (United States) Kaylan Bigun (Australia) Bernard Tomic (United States) Denis Kudla
September 9	Las Vegas Challenger; Las Vegas, United States; Hard – Challenger 75 – 32S/24Q/16D; Singles – Doubles	(United States) Trey Hilderbrand (United States) Alex Lawson; 6–7^{(9–11)}, 7–5, [10–8]	(United States) Tristan Boyer (United States) Tennyson Whiting	(Brazil) Karue Sell (Jordan) Abdullah Shelbayh	(United States) Andres Martin (United States) Kaylan Bigun (Australia) Bernard Tomic (United States) Denis Kudla
September 9	Dobrich Challenger II; Dobrich, Bulgaria; Clay – Challenger 50 – 32S/24Q/16D; Singles – Doubles	(Netherlands) Guy den Ouden; 6–2, 6–3	(Netherlands) Jelle Sels	(Argentina) Genaro Alberto Olivieri (Czech Republic) Jakub Nicod	(France) Valentin Royer (Bulgaria) Alexander Donski (Italy) Lorenzo Giustino (Bulgaria) Dimitar Kuzmanov
September 9	Dobrich Challenger II; Dobrich, Bulgaria; Clay – Challenger 50 – 32S/24Q/16D; Singles – Doubles	(Canada) Liam Draxl (Canada) Cleeve Harper; 6–1, 3–6, [12–10]	(Italy) Francesco Maestrelli (Italy) Filippo Romano	(Argentina) Genaro Alberto Olivieri (Czech Republic) Jakub Nicod	(France) Valentin Royer (Bulgaria) Alexander Donski (Italy) Lorenzo Giustino (Bulgaria) Dimitar Kuzmanov
September 16	Bad Waltersdorf Trophy; Bad Waltersdorf, Austria; Clay – Challenger 125 – 32S/24Q/16D; Singles – Doubles	(Spain) Jaume Munar; 6–2, 6–1	(Brazil) Thiago Seyboth Wild	(United States) Nicolas Moreno de Alboran (Serbia) Laslo Djere	(Croatia) Matej Dodig (France) Geoffrey Blancaneaux (Spain) Carlos Taberner (Brazil) Thiago Monteiro
September 16	Bad Waltersdorf Trophy; Bad Waltersdorf, Austria; Clay – Challenger 125 – 32S/24Q/16D; Singles – Doubles	(Czech Republic) Petr Nouza (Czech Republic) Patrik Rikl; 6–4, 4–6, [10–5]	(Argentina) Guido Andreozzi (India) Sriram Balaji	(United States) Nicolas Moreno de Alboran (Serbia) Laslo Djere	(Croatia) Matej Dodig (France) Geoffrey Blancaneaux (Spain) Carlos Taberner (Brazil) Thiago Monteiro
September 16	Saint-Tropez Open; Saint-Tropez, France; Hard – Challenger 125 – 32S/24Q/16D; Singles – Doubles	(Netherlands) Gijs Brouwer; 6–4, 7–6^{(7–2)}	(France) Lucas Pouille	(Poland) Kamil Majchrzak (France) Ugo Blanchet	(Croatia) Duje Ajduković (France) Matteo Martineau (France) Benjamin Bonzi (France) Titouan Droguet
September 16	Saint-Tropez Open; Saint-Tropez, France; Hard – Challenger 125 – 32S/24Q/16D; Singles – Doubles	(Netherlands) Sander Arends (United Kingdom) Luke Johnson; 3–6, 6–3, [10–4]	(Sweden) André Göransson (Netherlands) Sem Verbeek	(Poland) Kamil Majchrzak (France) Ugo Blanchet	(Croatia) Duje Ajduković (France) Matteo Martineau (France) Benjamin Bonzi (France) Titouan Droguet
September 16	Cali Open; Cali, Colombia; Clay – Challenger 75 – 32S/24Q/16D; Singles – Doubles	(Argentina) Juan Pablo Ficovich; 6–1, 6–4	(Peru) Gonzalo Bueno	(Argentina) Andrea Collarini (Bolivia) Hugo Dellien	(Argentina) Luciano Emanuel Ambrogi (Brazil) Mateus Alves (Argentina) Juan Bautista Torres (France) Enzo Couacaud
September 16	Cali Open; Cali, Colombia; Clay – Challenger 75 – 32S/24Q/16D; Singles – Doubles	(Canada) Juan Carlos Aguilar (Peru) Conner Huertas del Pino; 5–7, 6–3, [10–7]	(Colombia) Juan Sebastián Gómez (Colombia) Johan Alexander Rodríguez	(Argentina) Andrea Collarini (Bolivia) Hugo Dellien	(Argentina) Luciano Emanuel Ambrogi (Brazil) Mateus Alves (Argentina) Juan Bautista Torres (France) Enzo Couacaud
September 16	Columbus Challenger; Columbus, United States; Hard (i) – Challenger 75 – 32S/24Q/16D; Singles – Doubles	(Japan) Naoki Nakagawa; 7–6^{(10–8)}, 5–7, 7–6^{(7–5)}	(Japan) James Trotter	(United Kingdom) Kyle Edmund (United States) Nishesh Basavareddy	(United States) Christopher Eubanks (Jordan) Abdullah Shelbayh (United States) Tristan Boyer (Mexico) Ernesto Escobedo
September 16	Columbus Challenger; Columbus, United States; Hard (i) – Challenger 75 – 32S/24Q/16D; Singles – Doubles	(Mexico) Hans Hach Verdugo (Japan) James Trotter; 6–4, 6–7^{(6–8)}, [11–9]	(United States) Christian Harrison (United States) Ethan Quinn	(United Kingdom) Kyle Edmund (United States) Nishesh Basavareddy	(United States) Christopher Eubanks (Jordan) Abdullah Shelbayh (United States) Tristan Boyer (Mexico) Ernesto Escobedo
September 16	Sibiu Open; Sibiu, Romania; Clay – Challenger 50 – 32S/24Q/16D; Singles – Doubles	(France) Valentin Royer; 6–4, 6–0	(France) Luka Pavlovic	(Romania) Cezar Crețu (Czech Republic) Hynek Bartoň	(Italy) Stefano Travaglia (Germany) Rudolf Molleker (Argentina) Genaro Alberto Olivieri (Spain) Pol Martín Tiffon
September 16	Sibiu Open; Sibiu, Romania; Clay – Challenger 50 – 32S/24Q/16D; Singles – Doubles	(Peru) Alexander Merino (Germany) Christoph Negritu; 6–2, 7–6^{(7–2)}	(Canada) Liam Draxl (Canada) Cleeve Harper	(Romania) Cezar Crețu (Czech Republic) Hynek Bartoň	(Italy) Stefano Travaglia (Germany) Rudolf Molleker (Argentina) Genaro Alberto Olivieri (Spain) Pol Martín Tiffon
September 23	Open d'Orléans; Orléans, France; Hard (i) – Challenger 125 – 32S/24Q/16D; Singles – Doubles	(United Kingdom) Jacob Fearnley; 6–3, 7–6^{(7–5)}	(France) Harold Mayot	(Switzerland) Marc-Andrea Hüsler (Belgium) Alexander Blockx	(France) Benjamin Bonzi (Serbia) Hamad Medjedovic (Italy) Matteo Gigante (Estonia) Mark Lajal
September 23	Open d'Orléans; Orléans, France; Hard (i) – Challenger 125 – 32S/24Q/16D; Singles – Doubles	(France) Benjamin Bonzi (France) Sascha Gueymard Wayenburg; 7–6^{(9–7)}, 4–6, [10–5]	(France) Manuel Guinard (France) Grégoire Jacq	(Switzerland) Marc-Andrea Hüsler (Belgium) Alexander Blockx	(France) Benjamin Bonzi (Serbia) Hamad Medjedovic (Italy) Matteo Gigante (Estonia) Mark Lajal
September 23	Antofagasta Challenger; Antofagasta, Chile; Clay – Challenger 100 – 32S/24Q/16D; Singles – Doubles	(Argentina) Juan Manuel Cerúndolo; 3–6, 6–2, 6–4	(Paraguay) Daniel Vallejo	(Argentina) Andrea Collarini (Netherlands) Jesper de Jong	(Argentina) Juan Ignacio Londero (Brazil) Gustavo Heide (Bolivia) Murkel Dellien (Argentina) Luciano Emanuel Ambrogi
September 23	Antofagasta Challenger; Antofagasta, Chile; Clay – Challenger 100 – 32S/24Q/16D; Singles – Doubles	(Brazil) Mateus Alves (Chile) Matías Soto; 6–1, 6–4	(Argentina) Leonardo Aboian (Argentina) Valerio Aboian	(Argentina) Andrea Collarini (Netherlands) Jesper de Jong	(Argentina) Juan Ignacio Londero (Brazil) Gustavo Heide (Bolivia) Murkel Dellien (Argentina) Luciano Emanuel Ambrogi
September 23	Lisboa Belém Open; Lisbon, Portugal; Clay – Challenger 100 – 32S/24Q/16D; Singles – Doubles	(Switzerland) Alexander Ritschard; 6–3, 6–7^{(3–7)}, 6–3	(Belgium) Raphaël Collignon	(Denmark) Elmer Møller (United States) Emilio Nava	(Hungary) Zsombor Piros (Argentina) Thiago Agustín Tirante (Portugal) Henrique Rocha (Chile) Tomás Barrios Vera
September 23	Lisboa Belém Open; Lisbon, Portugal; Clay – Challenger 100 – 32S/24Q/16D; Singles – Doubles	(Monaco) Romain Arneodo (France) Théo Arribagé; 6–2, 6–3	(United States) George Goldhoff (Brazil) Fernando Romboli	(Denmark) Elmer Møller (United States) Emilio Nava	(Hungary) Zsombor Piros (Argentina) Thiago Agustín Tirante (Portugal) Henrique Rocha (Chile) Tomás Barrios Vera
September 23	Nonthaburi Challenger IV; Nonthaburi, Thailand; Hard – Challenger 100 – 32S/24Q/16D; Singles – Doubles	(Chinese Taipei) Wu Tung-lin; 6–3, 7–6^{(7–4)}	(United States) Mackenzie McDonald	(Australia) James McCabe (Hong Kong) Coleman Wong	(France) Arthur Cazaux (Czech Republic) Dalibor Svrčina (Canada) Gabriel Diallo (Australia) Adam Walton
September 23	Nonthaburi Challenger IV; Nonthaburi, Thailand; Hard – Challenger 100 – 32S/24Q/16D; Singles – Doubles	(Australia) Blake Ellis (Australia) Adam Walton; 3–6, 7–5, [10–8]	(India) Rithvik Choudary Bollipalli (India) Arjun Kadhe	(Australia) James McCabe (Hong Kong) Coleman Wong	(France) Arthur Cazaux (Czech Republic) Dalibor Svrčina (Canada) Gabriel Diallo (Australia) Adam Walton
September 23	LTP Men's Open; Charleston, United States; Hard – Challenger 75 – 32S/24Q/16D; Singles – Doubles	(Lithuania) Edas Butvilas; 6–4, 6–3	(United States) Nishesh Basavareddy	(United States) Christopher Eubanks (United States) Tristan Boyer	(Canada) Alexis Galarneau (United States) J. J. Wolf (Australia) Bernard Tomic (United States) Learner Tien
September 23	LTP Men's Open; Charleston, United States; Hard – Challenger 75 – 32S/24Q/16D; Singles – Doubles	(Australia) Luke Saville (Australia) Tristan Schoolkate; 6–7^{(3–7)}, 6–1, [10–3]	(Australia) Calum Puttergill (Australia) Dane Sweeny	(United States) Christopher Eubanks (United States) Tristan Boyer	(Canada) Alexis Galarneau (United States) J. J. Wolf (Australia) Bernard Tomic (United States) Learner Tien
September 30	JC Ferrero Challenger Open; Villena, Spain; Hard – Challenger 100 – 32S/24Q/16D; Singles – Doubles	(Poland) Kamil Majchrzak; 6–4, 6–2	(United States) Nicolas Moreno de Alboran	(Spain) Martín Landaluce (Switzerland) Jérôme Kym	(Croatia) Duje Ajduković (France) Hugo Grenier (France) Constant Lestienne (Germany) Justin Engel
September 30	JC Ferrero Challenger Open; Villena, Spain; Hard – Challenger 100 – 32S/24Q/16D; Singles – Doubles	(India) Anirudh Chandrasekar (India) Niki Kaliyanda Poonacha; 7–6^{(7–2)}, 6–4	(Monaco) Romain Arneodo (Spain) Íñigo Cervantes	(Spain) Martín Landaluce (Switzerland) Jérôme Kym	(Croatia) Duje Ajduković (France) Hugo Grenier (France) Constant Lestienne (Germany) Justin Engel
September 30	Open de Vendée; Mouilleron-le-Captif, France; Hard (i) – Challenger 100 – 32S/24Q/16D; Singles – Doubles	(France) Lucas Pouille; 6–4, 6–4	(France) Quentin Halys	(Croatia) Dino Prižmić (France) Harold Mayot	(Netherlands) Jelle Sels (France) Sascha Gueymard Wayenburg (France) Manuel Guinard (France) Clément Chidekh
September 30	Open de Vendée; Mouilleron-le-Captif, France; Hard (i) – Challenger 100 – 32S/24Q/16D; Singles – Doubles	(Brazil) Marcelo Demoliner (United States) Christian Harrison; 6–3, 7–5	(Denmark) August Holmgren (Denmark) Johannes Ingildsen	(Croatia) Dino Prižmić (France) Harold Mayot	(Netherlands) Jelle Sels (France) Sascha Gueymard Wayenburg (France) Manuel Guinard (France) Clément Chidekh
September 30	Braga Open; Braga, Portugal; Clay – Challenger 75 – 32S/24Q/16D; Singles – Doubles	(Denmark) Elmer Møller; 6–4, 7–6^{(7–4)}	(Colombia) Daniel Elahi Galán	(Italy) Andrea Pellegrino (Spain) Albert Ramos Viñolas	(Austria) Lukas Neumayer (France) Clément Tabur (Spain) Carlos Taberner (Czech Republic) Vít Kopřiva
September 30	Braga Open; Braga, Portugal; Clay – Challenger 75 – 32S/24Q/16D; Singles – Doubles	(France) Théo Arribagé (Portugal) Francisco Cabral; 6–3, 6–4	(Italy) Marco Bortolotti (Israel) Daniel Cukierman	(Italy) Andrea Pellegrino (Spain) Albert Ramos Viñolas	(Austria) Lukas Neumayer (France) Clément Tabur (Spain) Carlos Taberner (Czech Republic) Vít Kopřiva
September 30	Challenger de Buenos Aires; Buenos Aires, Argentina; Clay – Challenger 75 – 32S/24Q/16D; Singles – Doubles	(Argentina) Francisco Comesaña; 1–6, 7–6^{(9–7)}, 6–4	(Argentina) Federico Coria	(Argentina) Juan Bautista Torres (Bolivia) Hugo Dellien	(Brazil) Gustavo Heide (Argentina) Camilo Ugo Carabelli (Netherlands) Jesper de Jong (Peru) Juan Pablo Varillas
September 30	Challenger de Buenos Aires; Buenos Aires, Argentina; Clay – Challenger 75 – 32S/24Q/16D; Singles – Doubles	(Bolivia) Murkel Dellien (Argentina) Facundo Mena; 1–6, 6–2, [12–10]	(Brazil) Felipe Meligeni Alves (Brazil) Marcelo Zormann	(Argentina) Juan Bautista Torres (Bolivia) Hugo Dellien	(Brazil) Gustavo Heide (Argentina) Camilo Ugo Carabelli (Netherlands) Jesper de Jong (Peru) Juan Pablo Varillas
September 30	Tiburon Challenger; Tiburon, United States; Hard – Challenger 75 – 32S/24Q/16D; Singles – Doubles	(United States) Nishesh Basavareddy; 6–1, 6–1	(United States) Eliot Spizzirri	(United Kingdom) Jack Pinnington Jones (United States) Learner Tien	(Brazil) Karue Sell (United States) Colton Smith (United States) J. J. Wolf (United States) Denis Kudla
September 30	Tiburon Challenger; Tiburon, United States; Hard – Challenger 75 – 32S/24Q/16D; Singles – Doubles	(Australia) Luke Saville (Australia) Tristan Schoolkate; 6–4, 6–2	(United States) Patrick Kypson (United States) Eliot Spizzirri	(United Kingdom) Jack Pinnington Jones (United States) Learner Tien	(Brazil) Karue Sell (United States) Colton Smith (United States) J. J. Wolf (United States) Denis Kudla

=== October ===
Week of	Tournament	Champions	Runners-up	Semifinalists	Quarterfinalists
October 7	Hangzhou Challenger; Hangzhou, China; Hard – Challenger 125 – 32S/24Q/16D; Singles – Doubles	(Australia) James Duckworth; 2–6, 7–6^{(7–5)}, 6–4	(United States) Mackenzie McDonald	(Chinese Taipei) Tseng Chun-hsin (Canada) Gabriel Diallo	(Australia) Adam Walton (Italy) Fabio Fognini (France) Arthur Cazaux (Australia) Rinky Hijikata
October 7	Hangzhou Challenger; Hangzhou, China; Hard – Challenger 125 – 32S/24Q/16D; Singles – Doubles	(China) Sun Fajing (China) Te Rigele; 6–3, 7–5	(Australia) Thomas Fancutt (Japan) Yuta Shimizu	(Chinese Taipei) Tseng Chun-hsin (Canada) Gabriel Diallo	(Australia) Adam Walton (Italy) Fabio Fognini (France) Arthur Cazaux (Australia) Rinky Hijikata
October 7	Copa Faulcombridge; Valencia, Spain; Clay – Challenger 125 – 32S/24Q/16D; Singles – Doubles	(Spain) Pedro Martínez; 6–1, 6–3	(Portugal) Jaime Faria	(Colombia) Daniel Elahi Galán (United States) Nicolas Moreno de Alboran	(Peru) Ignacio Buse (United Kingdom) Jan Choinski (Argentina) Thiago Agustín Tirante (Austria) Dennis Novak
October 7	Copa Faulcombridge; Valencia, Spain; Clay – Challenger 125 – 32S/24Q/16D; Singles – Doubles	(Peru) Alexander Merino (Germany) Christoph Negritu; 6–3, 6–4	(Poland) Karol Drzewiecki (Poland) Piotr Matuszewski	(Colombia) Daniel Elahi Galán (United States) Nicolas Moreno de Alboran	(Peru) Ignacio Buse (United Kingdom) Jan Choinski (Argentina) Thiago Agustín Tirante (Austria) Dennis Novak
October 7	Open de Roanne; Roanne, France; Hard (i) – Challenger 100 – 32S/24Q/16D; Singles – Doubles	(France) Benjamin Bonzi; 7–5, 6–1	(France) Matteo Martineau	(France) Luca Van Assche (France) Hugo Grenier	(United Kingdom) Cameron Norrie (France) Pierre-Hugues Herbert (Switzerland) Jérôme Kym (Spain) David Jordà Sanchis
October 7	Open de Roanne; Roanne, France; Hard (i) – Challenger 100 – 32S/24Q/16D; Singles – Doubles	(Colombia) Nicolás Barrientos (Netherlands) David Pel; 4–6, 6–3, [10–6]	(Switzerland) Jakub Paul (Czech Republic) Matěj Vocel	(France) Luca Van Assche (France) Hugo Grenier	(United Kingdom) Cameron Norrie (France) Pierre-Hugues Herbert (Switzerland) Jérôme Kym (Spain) David Jordà Sanchis
October 7	Challenger de Villa María; Villa María, Argentina; Clay – Challenger 100 – 32S/24Q/16D; Singles – Doubles	(Argentina) Camilo Ugo Carabelli; 7–6^{(7–3)}, 3–6, 6–4	(Netherlands) Jesper de Jong	(Argentina) Román Andrés Burruchaga (Argentina) Juan Manuel Cerúndolo	(Argentina) Federico Coria (Bolivia) Hugo Dellien (Brazil) Pedro Sakamoto (Brazil) Matheus Pucinelli de Almeida
October 7	Challenger de Villa María; Villa María, Argentina; Clay – Challenger 100 – 32S/24Q/16D; Singles – Doubles	(Brazil) Orlando Luz (Brazil) Marcelo Zormann; 0–6, 6–3, [10–4]	(Bolivia) Boris Arias (Bolivia) Federico Zeballos	(Argentina) Román Andrés Burruchaga (Argentina) Juan Manuel Cerúndolo	(Argentina) Federico Coria (Bolivia) Hugo Dellien (Brazil) Pedro Sakamoto (Brazil) Matheus Pucinelli de Almeida
October 7	Fairfield Challenger; Fairfield, United States; Hard – Challenger 75 – 32S/24Q/16D; Singles – Doubles	(United States) Learner Tien; 6–0, 6–1	(Australia) Bernard Tomic	(United States) Brandon Holt (Australia) Tristan Schoolkate	(United States) Patrick Kypson (Kazakhstan) Dmitry Popko (Canada) Alexis Galarneau (United States) Ethan Quinn
October 7	Fairfield Challenger; Fairfield, United States; Hard – Challenger 75 – 32S/24Q/16D; Singles – Doubles	(United States) Ryan Seggerman (United States) Patrik Trhac; 6–2, 3–6, [10–5]	(Romania) Gabi Adrian Boitan (United States) Bruno Kuzuhara	(United States) Brandon Holt (Australia) Tristan Schoolkate	(United States) Patrick Kypson (Kazakhstan) Dmitry Popko (Canada) Alexis Galarneau (United States) Ethan Quinn
October 14	Olbia Challenger; Olbia, Italy; Hard – Challenger 125 – 32S/24Q/16D; Singles – Doubles	(Spain) Martín Landaluce; 6–4, 6–4	(Italy) Mattia Bellucci	(Italy) Matteo Gigante (Czech Republic) Dalibor Svrčina	(Spain) Javier Barranco Cosano (Italy) Andrea Vavassori (Italy) Samuel Vincent Ruggeri (France) Constant Lestienne
October 14	Olbia Challenger; Olbia, Italy; Hard – Challenger 125 – 32S/24Q/16D; Singles – Doubles	(Ukraine) Oleksii Krutykh (Ukraine) Vitaliy Sachko; 4–6, 6–1, [10–5]	(Spain) Íñigo Cervantes (Austria) David Pichler	(Italy) Matteo Gigante (Czech Republic) Dalibor Svrčina	(Spain) Javier Barranco Cosano (Italy) Andrea Vavassori (Italy) Samuel Vincent Ruggeri (France) Constant Lestienne
October 14	Campeonato Internacional de Tênis de Campinas; Campinas, Brazil; Clay – Challenger 100 – 32S/24Q/16D; Singles – Doubles	(United States) Tristan Boyer; 6–2, 3–6, 6–3	(Argentina) Juan Pablo Ficovich	(Argentina) Camilo Ugo Carabelli (Ecuador) Álvaro Guillén Meza	(Bolivia) Juan Carlos Prado Ángelo (Chile) Tomás Barrios Vera (Peru) Juan Pablo Varillas (Argentina) Román Andrés Burruchaga
October 14	Campeonato Internacional de Tênis de Campinas; Campinas, Brazil; Clay – Challenger 100 – 32S/24Q/16D; Singles – Doubles	(Brazil) Mateus Alves (Brazil) Orlando Luz; 6–3, 6–4	(Chile) Tomás Barrios Vera (Argentina) Facundo Mena	(Argentina) Camilo Ugo Carabelli (Ecuador) Álvaro Guillén Meza	(Bolivia) Juan Carlos Prado Ángelo (Chile) Tomás Barrios Vera (Peru) Juan Pablo Varillas (Argentina) Román Andrés Burruchaga
October 14	Shenzhen Longhua Open; Shenzhen, China; Hard – Challenger 100 – 32S/24Q/16D; Singles – Doubles	(United States) Mackenzie McDonald; 6–4, 7–6^{(7–4)}	(France) Arthur Cazaux	(China) Bai Yan (Australia) Adam Walton	(France) Arthur Weber (Georgia (country)) Saba Purtseladze (South Africa) Kris van Wyk (Australia) James McCabe
October 14	Shenzhen Longhua Open; Shenzhen, China; Hard – Challenger 100 – 32S/24Q/16D; Singles – Doubles	(Thailand) Pruchya Isaro (China) Wang Aoran; 7–6^{(7–4)}, 6–3	(Chinese Taipei) Ray Ho (United Kingdom) Joshua Paris	(China) Bai Yan (Australia) Adam Walton	(France) Arthur Weber (Georgia (country)) Saba Purtseladze (South Africa) Kris van Wyk (Australia) James McCabe
October 14	Calgary National Bank Challenger; Calgary, Canada; Hard (i) – Challenger 75 – 32S/24Q/16D; Singles – Doubles	(United States) Murphy Cassone; 4–6, 6–3, 6–4	(United States) Govind Nanda	(Canada) Liam Draxl (Tunisia) Aziz Dougaz	(Poland) Maks Kaśnikowski (Australia) Bernard Tomic (Colombia) Nicolás Mejía (Canada) Alexis Galarneau
October 14	Calgary National Bank Challenger; Calgary, Canada; Hard (i) – Challenger 75 – 32S/24Q/16D; Singles – Doubles	(United States) Ryan Seggerman (United States) Patrik Trhac; 6–3, 7–6^{(7–3)}	(United States) Robert Cash (United States) JJ Tracy	(Canada) Liam Draxl (Tunisia) Aziz Dougaz	(Poland) Maks Kaśnikowski (Australia) Bernard Tomic (Colombia) Nicolás Mejía (Canada) Alexis Galarneau
October 14	Open Saint-Brieuc; Saint-Brieuc, France; Hard (i) – Challenger 75 – 32S/24Q/16D; Singles – Doubles	(France) Benjamin Bonzi; 6–2, 6–3	(France) Lucas Pouille	(France) Antoine Cornut-Chauvinc (France) Grégoire Barrère	(Germany) Max Hans Rehberg (United Kingdom) Kyle Edmund (France) Calvin Hemery (United Kingdom) Paul Jubb
October 14	Open Saint-Brieuc; Saint-Brieuc, France; Hard (i) – Challenger 75 – 32S/24Q/16D; Singles – Doubles	(France) Geoffrey Blancaneaux (France) Gabriel Debru; 3–3, defaulted	(Switzerland) Jakub Paul (Czech Republic) Matěj Vocel	(France) Antoine Cornut-Chauvinc (France) Grégoire Barrère	(Germany) Max Hans Rehberg (United Kingdom) Kyle Edmund (France) Calvin Hemery (United Kingdom) Paul Jubb
October 21	Taipei OEC Open; Taipei, Taiwan; Hard (i) – Challenger 125 – 32S/24Q/16D; Singles – Doubles	(Japan) Taro Daniel; 6–4, 7–5	(Australia) Adam Walton	(Australia) Aleksandar Vukic (Chinese Taipei) Tseng Chun-hsin	(India) Mukund Sasikumar (United States) Mackenzie McDonald (Chinese Taipei) Hsu Yu-hsiou (Hong Kong) Coleman Wong
October 21	Taipei OEC Open; Taipei, Taiwan; Hard (i) – Challenger 125 – 32S/24Q/16D; Singles – Doubles	(United Kingdom) David Stevenson (United Kingdom) Marcus Willis; 6–3, 6–3	(South Korea) Nam Ji-sung (United Kingdom) Joshua Paris	(Australia) Aleksandar Vukic (Chinese Taipei) Tseng Chun-hsin	(India) Mukund Sasikumar (United States) Mackenzie McDonald (Chinese Taipei) Hsu Yu-hsiou (Hong Kong) Coleman Wong
October 21	Brest Challenger; Brest, France; Hard (i) – Challenger 100 – 32S/24Q/16D; Singles – Doubles	(Finland) Otto Virtanen; 6–4, 4–6, 7–6^{(8–6)}	(France) Benjamin Bonzi	Alibek Kachmazov (Lebanon) Benjamin Hassan	(Brazil) João Fonseca (Kazakhstan) Mikhail Kukushkin (Switzerland) Jakub Paul (France) Luca Van Assche
October 21	Brest Challenger; Brest, France; Hard (i) – Challenger 100 – 32S/24Q/16D; Singles – Doubles	(Colombia) Nicolás Barrientos (Tunisia) Skander Mansouri; 7–5, 4–6, [10–5]	(Switzerland) Jakub Paul (Czech Republic) Matěj Vocel	Alibek Kachmazov (Lebanon) Benjamin Hassan	(Brazil) João Fonseca (Kazakhstan) Mikhail Kukushkin (Switzerland) Jakub Paul (France) Luca Van Assche
October 21	Curitiba Challenger; Curitiba, Brazil; Clay – Challenger 100 – 32S/24Q/16D; Singles – Doubles	(Portugal) Jaime Faria; 6–4, 6–4	(Brazil) Felipe Meligeni Alves	(Brazil) Gustavo Heide (Argentina) Juan Manuel Cerúndolo	(Brazil) Mateus Alves (Portugal) Gastão Elias (Argentina) Román Andrés Burruchaga (Ecuador) Álvaro Guillén Meza
October 21	Curitiba Challenger; Curitiba, Brazil; Clay – Challenger 100 – 32S/24Q/16D; Singles – Doubles	(Brazil) Fernando Romboli (Chile) Matías Soto; 7–6^{(7–5)}, 7–6^{(7–4)}	(Poland) Karol Drzewiecki (Poland) Piotr Matuszewski	(Brazil) Gustavo Heide (Argentina) Juan Manuel Cerúndolo	(Brazil) Mateus Alves (Portugal) Gastão Elias (Argentina) Román Andrés Burruchaga (Ecuador) Álvaro Guillén Meza
October 21	City of Playford Tennis International; Playford, Australia; Hard – Challenger 75 – 32S/24Q/16D; Singles – Doubles	(Australia) Rinky Hijikata; 6–4, 7–6^{(7–4)}	(Japan) Yuta Shimizu	(Japan) Masamichi Imamura (Australia) Marc Polmans	(Australia) Omar Jasika (Australia) Tristan Schoolkate (Japan) Shintaro Mochizuki (Australia) Li Tu
October 21	City of Playford Tennis International; Playford, Australia; Hard – Challenger 75 – 32S/24Q/16D; Singles – Doubles	(Australia) Blake Ellis (Australia) Thomas Fancutt; 6–1, 5–7, [10–5]	(Australia) Jake Delaney (Australia) Jesse Delaney	(Japan) Masamichi Imamura (Australia) Marc Polmans	(Australia) Omar Jasika (Australia) Tristan Schoolkate (Japan) Shintaro Mochizuki (Australia) Li Tu
October 21	Sioux Falls Challenger; Sioux Falls, United States; Hard (i) – Challenger 75 – 32S/24Q/16D; Singles – Doubles	(Croatia) Borna Gojo; 6–1, 7–5	(United States) Colton Smith	(United States) Murphy Cassone (Estonia) Mark Lajal	(United States) Christopher Eubanks (United States) Ozan Baris (United States) Patrick Kypson (United States) Brandon Holt
October 21	Sioux Falls Challenger; Sioux Falls, United States; Hard (i) – Challenger 75 – 32S/24Q/16D; Singles – Doubles	(Canada) Liam Draxl (Canada) Cleeve Harper; 7–5, 6–3	(United States) Ryan Seggerman (United States) Patrik Trhac	(United States) Murphy Cassone (Estonia) Mark Lajal	(United States) Christopher Eubanks (United States) Ozan Baris (United States) Patrick Kypson (United States) Brandon Holt
October 28	Slovak Open; Bratislava, Slovakia; Hard (i) – Challenger 125 – 32S/24Q/16D; Singles – Doubles	Roman Safiullin; 6–3, 6–4	(Belgium) Raphaël Collignon	(Japan) Kei Nishikori (Croatia) Dino Prižmić	Aslan Karatsev (France) Constant Lestienne (United Kingdom) Jacob Fearnley (Canada) Gabriel Diallo
October 28	Slovak Open; Bratislava, Slovakia; Hard (i) – Challenger 125 – 32S/24Q/16D; Singles – Doubles	(Colombia) Nicolás Barrientos (United Kingdom) Julian Cash; 6–3, 6–4	(Sweden) André Göransson (Netherlands) Sem Verbeek	(Japan) Kei Nishikori (Croatia) Dino Prižmić	Aslan Karatsev (France) Constant Lestienne (United Kingdom) Jacob Fearnley (Canada) Gabriel Diallo
October 28	Seoul Open Challenger; Seoul, South Korea; Hard – Challenger 100 – 32S/24Q/16D; Singles – Doubles	(Georgia (country)) Nikoloz Basilashvili; 7–5, 6–4	(Japan) Taro Daniel	(Austria) Jurij Rodionov (France) Antoine Escoffier	(Thailand) Kasidit Samrej (United States) Nicolas Moreno de Alboran (Australia) Li Tu (Japan) Hiroki Moriya
October 28	Seoul Open Challenger; Seoul, South Korea; Hard – Challenger 100 – 32S/24Q/16D; Singles – Doubles	(India) Saketh Myneni (India) Ramkumar Ramanathan; 6–4, 4–6, [10–3]	(United States) Vasil Kirkov (Netherlands) Bart Stevens	(Austria) Jurij Rodionov (France) Antoine Escoffier	(Thailand) Kasidit Samrej (United States) Nicolas Moreno de Alboran (Australia) Li Tu (Japan) Hiroki Moriya
October 28	Charlottesville Men's Pro Challenger; Charlottesville, United States; Hard (i) – Challenger 75 – 32S/24Q/16D; Singles – Doubles	(Japan) James Trotter; 6–3, 6–4	(United States) Nishesh Basavareddy	(Canada) Alexis Galarneau (United States) Learner Tien	(Luxembourg) Chris Rodesch (United States) Ethan Quinn (United States) Colton Smith (Estonia) Mark Lajal
October 28	Charlottesville Men's Pro Challenger; Charlottesville, United States; Hard (i) – Challenger 75 – 32S/24Q/16D; Singles – Doubles	(United States) Robert Cash (United States) JJ Tracy; 4–6, 7–6^{(9–7)}, [10–7]	(Luxembourg) Chris Rodesch (United States) William Woodall	(Canada) Alexis Galarneau (United States) Learner Tien	(Luxembourg) Chris Rodesch (United States) Ethan Quinn (United States) Colton Smith (Estonia) Mark Lajal
October 28	Challenger Ciudad de Guayaquil; Guayaquil, Ecuador; Clay – Challenger 75 – 32S/24Q/16D; Singles – Doubles	(Argentina) Federico Agustín Gómez; 6–1, 6–4	(Chile) Tomás Barrios Vera	(Argentina) Román Andrés Burruchaga (Argentina) Federico Coria	(Argentina) Alex Barrena (Spain) Oriol Roca Batalla (Portugal) Henrique Rocha (Ecuador) Andrés Andrade
October 28	Challenger Ciudad de Guayaquil; Guayaquil, Ecuador; Clay – Challenger 75 – 32S/24Q/16D; Singles – Doubles	(Poland) Karol Drzewiecki (Poland) Piotr Matuszewski; 6–4, 7–6^{(7–2)}	(Brazil) Luís Britto (Brazil) Marcelo Zormann	(Argentina) Román Andrés Burruchaga (Argentina) Federico Coria	(Argentina) Alex Barrena (Spain) Oriol Roca Batalla (Portugal) Henrique Rocha (Ecuador) Andrés Andrade
October 28	NSW Open; Sydney, Australia; Hard – Challenger 75 – 32S/24Q/16D; Singles – Doubles	(Australia) Thanasi Kokkinakis; 6–1, 6–1	(Australia) Rinky Hijikata	(Japan) Yuta Shimizu (Australia) Tristan Schoolkate	(United Kingdom) Emile Hudd (New Zealand) Ajeet Rai (Australia) Omar Jasika (Japan) Hikaru Shiraishi
October 28	NSW Open; Sydney, Australia; Hard – Challenger 75 – 32S/24Q/16D; Singles – Doubles	(Australia) Blake Ellis (Australia) Thomas Fancutt; 7–5, 7–6^{(7–4)}	(Australia) Blake Bayldon (Netherlands) Mats Hermans	(Japan) Yuta Shimizu (Australia) Tristan Schoolkate	(United Kingdom) Emile Hudd (New Zealand) Ajeet Rai (Australia) Omar Jasika (Japan) Hikaru Shiraishi
October 28	Brazzaville Challenger; Brazzaville, Republic of the Congo; Clay – Challenger 50 – 32S/24Q/16D; Singles – Doubles	(Venezuela) Gonzalo Oliveira; 6–4, 6–3	(Romania) Filip Cristian Jianu	(Ivory Coast) Eliakim Coulibaly (Argentina) Santiago Rodríguez Taverna	(India) Karan Singh (France) Calvin Hemery (India) Dev Javia (France) Corentin Denolly
October 28	Brazzaville Challenger; Brazzaville, Republic of the Congo; Clay – Challenger 50 – 32S/24Q/16D; Singles – Doubles	(France) Florent Bax (India) Karan Singh; 7–5, 6–1	(Italy) Simone Agostini (South Africa) Alec Beckley	(Ivory Coast) Eliakim Coulibaly (Argentina) Santiago Rodríguez Taverna	(India) Karan Singh (France) Calvin Hemery (India) Dev Javia (France) Corentin Denolly

=== November ===
Week of	Tournament	Champions	Runners-up	Semifinalists	Quarterfinalists
November 4	HPP Open; Helsinki, Finland; Hard (i) – Challenger 125 – 32S/24Q/16D; Singles – Doubles	(Japan) Kei Nishikori; 3–6, 6–4, 6–1	(Italy) Luca Nardi	(Germany) Max Hans Rehberg (Kazakhstan) Denis Yevseyev	(Germany) Henri Squire (United Kingdom) Jacob Fearnley (Finland) Otto Virtanen (United Kingdom) Jan Choinski
November 4	HPP Open; Helsinki, Finland; Hard (i) – Challenger 125 – 32S/24Q/16D; Singles – Doubles	(Sweden) Filip Bergevi (Netherlands) Mick Veldheer; 3–6, 7–6^{(7–5)}, [10–5]	(Monaco) Romain Arneodo (France) Théo Arribagé	(Germany) Max Hans Rehberg (Kazakhstan) Denis Yevseyev	(Germany) Henri Squire (United Kingdom) Jacob Fearnley (Finland) Otto Virtanen (United Kingdom) Jan Choinski
November 4	Knoxville Challenger; Knoxville, United States; Hard (i) – Challenger 75 – 32S/24Q/16D; Singles – Doubles	(United States) Christopher Eubanks; 7–5, 7–6^{(11–9)}	(United States) Learner Tien	(United States) Nishesh Basavareddy (United Kingdom) Johannus Monday	(Estonia) Mark Lajal (United Kingdom) Jay Clarke (Japan) James Trotter (United States) Eliot Spizzirri
November 4	Knoxville Challenger; Knoxville, United States; Hard (i) – Challenger 75 – 32S/24Q/16D; Singles – Doubles	(Australia) Patrick Harper (United Kingdom) Johannus Monday; 6–2, 6–2	(United States) Micah Braswell (United States) Eliot Spizzirri	(United States) Nishesh Basavareddy (United Kingdom) Johannus Monday	(Estonia) Mark Lajal (United Kingdom) Jay Clarke (Japan) James Trotter (United States) Eliot Spizzirri
November 4	Lima Challenger II; Lima, Peru; Clay – Challenger 75 – 32S/24Q/16D; Singles – Doubles	(Czech Republic) Vít Kopřiva; 6–3, 7–6^{(7–3)}	(Denmark) Elmer Møller	(Argentina) Juan Manuel Cerúndolo (Portugal) Henrique Rocha	(Argentina) Francisco Comesaña (Argentina) Camilo Ugo Carabelli (Lithuania) Vilius Gaubas (Argentina) Federico Coria
November 4	Lima Challenger II; Lima, Peru; Clay – Challenger 75 – 32S/24Q/16D; Singles – Doubles	(Poland) Karol Drzewiecki (Poland) Piotr Matuszewski; 7–5, 6–4	(Brazil) Luís Britto (Brazil) Gustavo Heide	(Argentina) Juan Manuel Cerúndolo (Portugal) Henrique Rocha	(Argentina) Francisco Comesaña (Argentina) Camilo Ugo Carabelli (Lithuania) Vilius Gaubas (Argentina) Federico Coria
November 4	Matsuyama Challenger; Matsuyama, Japan; Hard – Challenger 75 – 32S/24Q/16D; Singles – Doubles	(United States) Nicolas Moreno de Alboran; 7–6^{(7–4)}, 6–2	(Australia) Alex Bolt	(Japan) Yosuke Watanuki (Belgium) Alexander Blockx	(Japan) Kokoro Isomura (France) Térence Atmane (Italy) Federico Cinà (Japan) Shintaro Mochizuki
November 4	Matsuyama Challenger; Matsuyama, Japan; Hard – Challenger 75 – 32S/24Q/16D; Singles – Doubles	(Japan) Seita Watanabe (Japan) Takeru Yuzuki; 6–4, 6–3	(United States) Nicolas Moreno de Alboran (New Zealand) Rubin Statham	(Japan) Yosuke Watanuki (Belgium) Alexander Blockx	(Japan) Kokoro Isomura (France) Térence Atmane (Italy) Federico Cinà (Japan) Shintaro Mochizuki
November 11	Kobe Challenger; Kobe, Japan; Hard (i) – Challenger 100 – 32S/24Q/16D; Singles – Doubles	(Belgium) Alexander Blockx; 6–3, 6–1	(Austria) Jurij Rodionov	(Italy) Mattia Bellucci (Japan) Taro Daniel	(Japan) Sho Shimabukuro (Lebanon) Benjamin Hassan (Japan) Yosuke Watanuki (Japan) Yasutaka Uchiyama
November 11	Kobe Challenger; Kobe, Japan; Hard (i) – Challenger 100 – 32S/24Q/16D; Singles – Doubles	(United States) Vasil Kirkov (Netherlands) Bart Stevens; 7–6^{(9–7)}, 7–5	(Japan) Kaichi Uchida (Japan) Takeru Yuzuki	(Italy) Mattia Bellucci (Japan) Taro Daniel	(Japan) Sho Shimabukuro (Lebanon) Benjamin Hassan (Japan) Yosuke Watanuki (Japan) Yasutaka Uchiyama
November 11	Uruguay Open; Montevideo, Uruguay; Clay – Challenger 100 – 32S/24Q/16D; Singles – Doubles	(United States) Tristan Boyer; 6–2, 6–4	(Bolivia) Hugo Dellien	(Argentina) Federico Coria (Argentina) Camilo Ugo Carabelli	(Brazil) Felipe Meligeni Alves (Brazil) Gustavo Heide (Argentina) Genaro Alberto Olivieri (Brazil) Thiago Monteiro
November 11	Uruguay Open; Montevideo, Uruguay; Clay – Challenger 100 – 32S/24Q/16D; Singles – Doubles	(Argentina) Guido Andreozzi (Brazil) Orlando Luz; 4–6, 6–3, [10–8]	(Argentina) Mariano Kestelboim (Uruguay) Franco Roncadelli	(Argentina) Federico Coria (Argentina) Camilo Ugo Carabelli	(Brazil) Felipe Meligeni Alves (Brazil) Gustavo Heide (Argentina) Genaro Alberto Olivieri (Brazil) Thiago Monteiro
November 11	Champaign–Urbana Challenger; Champaign, United States; Hard (i) – Challenger 75 – 32S/24Q/16D; Singles – Doubles	(United States) Ethan Quinn; 6–3, 6–1	(United States) Nishesh Basavareddy	(Japan) Kenta Miyoshi (United States) Eliot Spizzirri	(United States) Micah Braswell (United Kingdom) Jack Pinnington Jones (United States) Patrick Kypson (United States) Govind Nanda
November 11	Champaign–Urbana Challenger; Champaign, United States; Hard (i) – Challenger 75 – 32S/24Q/16D; Singles – Doubles	(United States) Evan King (United States) Reese Stalder; 7–6^{(7–3)}, 7–5	(United Kingdom) James Davis (United Kingdom) James MacKinlay	(Japan) Kenta Miyoshi (United States) Eliot Spizzirri	(United States) Micah Braswell (United Kingdom) Jack Pinnington Jones (United States) Patrick Kypson (United States) Govind Nanda
November 11	Challenger Banque Nationale de Drummondville; Drummondville, Canada; Hard (i) – Challenger 75 – 32S/24Q/16D; Singles – Doubles	(United States) Aidan Mayo; 6–3, 3–6, 6–4	(Luxembourg) Chris Rodesch	(Japan) James Trotter (Germany) Patrick Zahraj	(France) Antoine Ghibaudo (Brazil) Karue Sell (Germany) Daniel Masur (Austria) Joel Schwärzler
November 11	Challenger Banque Nationale de Drummondville; Drummondville, Canada; Hard (i) – Challenger 75 – 32S/24Q/16D; Singles – Doubles	(United States) Robert Cash (United States) JJ Tracy; 6–2, 6–4	(Canada) Liam Draxl (Canada) Cleeve Harper	(Japan) James Trotter (Germany) Patrick Zahraj	(France) Antoine Ghibaudo (Brazil) Karue Sell (Germany) Daniel Masur (Austria) Joel Schwärzler
November 11	All In Open; Lyon, France; Hard (i) – Challenger 75 – 32S/24Q/16D; Singles – Doubles	(Belgium) Raphaël Collignon; 6–4, 6–2	(France) Calvin Hemery	(France) Grégoire Barrère (Brazil) João Fonseca	(Croatia) Borna Ćorić (France) Valentin Royer (Spain) Martín Landaluce (France) Loann Massard
November 11	All In Open; Lyon, France; Hard (i) – Challenger 75 – 32S/24Q/16D; Singles – Doubles	(United Kingdom) Luke Johnson (Austria) Lucas Miedler; 6–1, 6–2	(Spain) Sergio Martos Gornés (Austria) David Pichler	(France) Grégoire Barrère (Brazil) João Fonseca	(Croatia) Borna Ćorić (France) Valentin Royer (Spain) Martín Landaluce (France) Loann Massard
November 18	Internazionali di Tennis Città di Rovereto; Rovereto, Italy; Hard (i) – Challenger 100 – 32S/24Q/16D; Singles – Doubles	(Italy) Luca Nardi; 6–1, 6–3	(Italy) Francesco Maestrelli	(Denmark) August Holmgren (Spain) Martín Landaluce	(Croatia) Dino Prižmić; Alexey Vatutin (France) Geoffrey Blancaneaux (Ukraine) Oleg Prihodko
November 18	Internazionali di Tennis Città di Rovereto; Rovereto, Italy; Hard (i) – Challenger 100 – 32S/24Q/16D; Singles – Doubles	(India) Sriram Balaji (India) Rithvik Choudary Bollipalli; 6–3, 2–6, [12–10]	(France) Théo Arribagé (Portugal) Francisco Cabral	(Denmark) August Holmgren (Spain) Martín Landaluce	(Croatia) Dino Prižmić; Alexey Vatutin (France) Geoffrey Blancaneaux (Ukraine) Oleg Prihodko
November 18	Torneio Internacional Masculino de Tênis; São Paulo, Brazil; Hard – Challenger 75 – 32S/24Q/16D; Singles – Doubles	(Argentina) Francisco Comesaña; 7–5, 4–6, 6–4	(Argentina) Thiago Agustín Tirante	(Chile) Matías Soto (Chile) Tomás Barrios Vera	(Brazil) Gustavo Heide (Brazil) Felipe Meligeni Alves (United States) Garrett Johns (Lebanon) Hady Habib
November 18	Torneio Internacional Masculino de Tênis; São Paulo, Brazil; Hard – Challenger 75 – 32S/24Q/16D; Singles – Doubles	(Argentina) Federico Agustín Gómez (Venezuela) Luis David Martínez; 7–6^{(7–4)}, 7–5	(United States) Christian Harrison (United States) Evan King	(Chile) Matías Soto (Chile) Tomás Barrios Vera	(Brazil) Gustavo Heide (Brazil) Felipe Meligeni Alves (United States) Garrett Johns (Lebanon) Hady Habib
November 18	Montemar Challenger; Alicante, Spain; Clay – Challenger 75 – 32S/24Q/16D; Singles – Doubles	(Italy) Fabio Fognini; 6–3, 2–6, 6–3	(Austria) Lukas Neumayer	(Spain) Iñaki Montes de la Torre (Spain) Pol Martín Tiffon	(Kazakhstan) Denis Yevseyev (Norway) Nicolai Budkov Kjær (Jordan) Abdullah Shelbayh (Dominican Republic) Nick Hardt
November 18	Montemar Challenger; Alicante, Spain; Clay – Challenger 75 – 32S/24Q/16D; Singles – Doubles	(Poland) Karol Drzewiecki (Poland) Piotr Matuszewski; 6–3, 6–4	(Spain) Daniel Rincón (Jordan) Abdullah Shelbayh	(Spain) Iñaki Montes de la Torre (Spain) Pol Martín Tiffon	(Kazakhstan) Denis Yevseyev (Norway) Nicolai Budkov Kjær (Jordan) Abdullah Shelbayh (Dominican Republic) Nick Hardt
November 18	Keio Challenger; Yokohama, Japan; Hard – Challenger 75 – 32S/24Q/16D; Singles – Doubles	(Japan) Yuta Shimizu; 6–7^{(4–7)}, 6–4, 6–2	(Australia) Li Tu	(France) Constant Lestienne (Lebanon) Benjamin Hassan	Alexey Zakharov (Hong Kong) Coleman Wong (Japan) Rei Sakamoto (Australia) James McCabe
November 18	Keio Challenger; Yokohama, Japan; Hard – Challenger 75 – 32S/24Q/16D; Singles – Doubles	(Lebanon) Benjamin Hassan (India) Saketh Myneni; 6–2, 6–4	(Australia) Blake Bayldon (Australia) Calum Puttergill	(France) Constant Lestienne (Lebanon) Benjamin Hassan	Alexey Zakharov (Hong Kong) Coleman Wong (Japan) Rei Sakamoto (Australia) James McCabe
November 18	Puerto Vallarta Open; Puerto Vallarta, Mexico; Hard – Challenger 50 – 32S/24Q/16D; Singles – Doubles	(United States) Nishesh Basavareddy; 6–3, 7–6^{(7–4)}	(Canada) Liam Draxl	(Mexico) Luis Carlos Álvarez Valdés (Bulgaria) Dimitar Kuzmanov	(United States) Andre Ilagan (Germany) Mats Rosenkranz (United Kingdom) Patrick Brady (United States) Aidan Mayo
November 18	Puerto Vallarta Open; Puerto Vallarta, Mexico; Hard – Challenger 50 – 32S/24Q/16D; Singles – Doubles	(Canada) Liam Draxl (Canada) Benjamin Sigouin; 7–6^{(7–5)}, 6–2	(United States) Karl Poling (United States) Ryan Seggerman	(Mexico) Luis Carlos Álvarez Valdés (Bulgaria) Dimitar Kuzmanov	(United States) Andre Ilagan (Germany) Mats Rosenkranz (United Kingdom) Patrick Brady (United States) Aidan Mayo
November 25	Maia Challenger; Maia, Portugal; Clay (i) – Challenger 100 – 32S/24Q/16D; Singles – Doubles	(Bosnia and Herzegovina) Damir Džumhur; 6–3, 6–4	(Italy) Francesco Passaro	(Slovakia) Andrej Martin (Argentina) Federico Coria	(Portugal) Henrique Rocha (Spain) Daniel Mérida (Spain) Albert Ramos Viñolas (Belgium) Kimmer Coppejans
November 25	Maia Challenger; Maia, Portugal; Clay (i) – Challenger 100 – 32S/24Q/16D; Singles – Doubles	(France) Théo Arribagé (Portugal) Francisco Cabral; 6–1, 3–6, [10–5]	(Belgium) Kimmer Coppejans (Spain) Sergio Martos Gornés	(Slovakia) Andrej Martin (Argentina) Federico Coria	(Portugal) Henrique Rocha (Spain) Daniel Mérida (Spain) Albert Ramos Viñolas (Belgium) Kimmer Coppejans
November 25	Challenger Temuco; Temuco, Chile; Hard – Challenger 100 – 32S/24Q/16D; Singles – Doubles	(Lebanon) Hady Habib; 6–4, 6–7^{(3–7)}, 7–6^{(7–2)}	(Argentina) Camilo Ugo Carabelli	(Argentina) Renzo Olivo (Brazil) João Lucas Reis da Silva	(Bolivia) Juan Carlos Prado Ángelo (Chile) Tomás Barrios Vera (Brazil) Daniel Dutra da Silva (Peru) Conner Huertas del Pino
November 25	Challenger Temuco; Temuco, Chile; Hard – Challenger 100 – 32S/24Q/16D; Singles – Doubles	(United States) Christian Harrison (United States) Evan King; 7–6^{(7–5)}, 7–5	(Zimbabwe) Benjamin Lock (Argentina) Renzo Olivo	(Argentina) Renzo Olivo (Brazil) João Lucas Reis da Silva	(Bolivia) Juan Carlos Prado Ángelo (Chile) Tomás Barrios Vera (Brazil) Daniel Dutra da Silva (Peru) Conner Huertas del Pino
November 25	Yokkaichi Challenger; Yokkaichi, Japan; Hard – Challenger 75 – 32S/24Q/16D; Singles – Doubles	(Japan) Rei Sakamoto; 1–6, 6–3, 6–4	(Germany) Christoph Negritu	(Japan) Shintaro Mochizuki (Australia) Philip Sekulic	(Australia) Li Tu (Japan) Kaichi Uchida (Japan) Yuta Shimizu (Lebanon) Benjamin Hassan
November 25	Yokkaichi Challenger; Yokkaichi, Japan; Hard – Challenger 75 – 32S/24Q/16D; Singles – Doubles	(Australia) Thomas Fancutt (Switzerland) Jakub Paul; 6–2, 7–5	(Japan) Kokoro Isomura (Japan) Hikaru Shiraishi	(Japan) Shintaro Mochizuki (Australia) Philip Sekulic	(Australia) Li Tu (Japan) Kaichi Uchida (Japan) Yuta Shimizu (Lebanon) Benjamin Hassan
November 25	Manzanillo Open; Manzanillo, Mexico; Hard – Challenger 50 – 32S/24Q/16D; Singles – Doubles	(Germany) Mats Rosenkranz; 6–3, 6–4	(Venezuela) Gonzalo Oliveira	(Canada) Liam Draxl (United States) Aidan Mayo	(United States) Toby Kodat (Mexico) Ernesto Escobedo (Bulgaria) Dimitar Kuzmanov (Tunisia) Aziz Dougaz
November 25	Manzanillo Open; Manzanillo, Mexico; Hard – Challenger 50 – 32S/24Q/16D; Singles – Doubles	(Canada) Liam Draxl (Canada) Cleeve Harper; 6–7^{(4–7)}, 7–5, [12–10]	(New Zealand) Finn Reynolds (Canada) Benjamin Sigouin	(Canada) Liam Draxl (United States) Aidan Mayo	(United States) Toby Kodat (Mexico) Ernesto Escobedo (Bulgaria) Dimitar Kuzmanov (Tunisia) Aziz Dougaz

== Cancelled tournaments ==
The following tournaments were formally announced by the ATP before being cancelled.

Week of	Tournament
April 29	Sparta Prague Open Challenger; Prague, Czech Republic; Clay – Challenger 75
August 5	Banja Luka Challenger; Banja Luka, Bosnia and Herzegovina; Clay – Challenger 75
November 25	Maspalomas Challenger; Maspalomas, Spain; Clay – Challenger 75

== Statistical information ==
These tables present the number of singles (S) and doubles (D) titles won by each player and each nation during the season. The players/nations are sorted by: 1) total number of titles (a doubles title won by two players representing the same nation counts as only one win for the nation); 2) a singles > doubles hierarchy; 3) alphabetical order (by family names for players).

The ATP announced in March 2022 that players representing Russia or Belarus would not be able to compete under their respective country's flag due to the 2022 Russian invasion of Ukraine. These players competed under no nationality, and any titles won by these players weren't counted towards a country's tally of total titles.

=== Titles won by player ===
Total	Player	S	D	S	D
7	James Trotter (JPN)	● ●	● ● ● ● ●	2	5
7	Sander Arends (NED)		● ● ● ● ● ● ●	0	7
7	Théo Arribagé (FRA)		● ● ● ● ● ● ●	0	7
7	Luke Johnson (GBR)		● ● ● ● ● ● ●	0	7
7	Ryan Seggerman (USA)		● ● ● ● ● ● ●	0	7
7	Patrik Trhac (USA)		● ● ● ● ● ● ●	0	7
7	Marcus Willis (GBR)		● ● ● ● ● ● ●	0	7
6	Damir Džumhur (BIH)	● ● ● ● ● ●		6	0
6	Federico Agustín Gómez (ARG)	● ● ●	● ● ●	3	3
6	Christian Harrison (USA)		● ● ● ● ● ●	0	6
6	Orlando Luz (BRA)		● ● ● ● ● ●	0	6
6	Piotr Matuszewski (POL)		● ● ● ● ● ●	0	6
5	Tristan Schoolkate (AUS)	●	● ● ● ●	1	4
5	Guido Andreozzi (ARG)		● ● ● ● ●	0	5
5	Liam Draxl (CAN)		● ● ● ● ●	0	5
5	Thomas Fancutt (AUS)		● ● ● ● ●	0	5
5	Manuel Guinard (FRA)		● ● ● ● ●	0	5
5	Grégoire Jacq (FRA)		● ● ● ● ●	0	5
5	Skander Mansouri (TUN)		● ● ● ● ●	0	5
5	Petr Nouza (CZE)		● ● ● ● ●	0	5
5	Patrik Rikl (CZE)		● ● ● ● ●	0	5
5	Matthew Romios (AUS)		● ● ● ● ●	0	5
4	Jacob Fearnley (GBR)	● ● ● ●		4	0
4	Benjamin Bonzi (FRA)	● ● ●	●	3	1
4	Tristan Boyer (USA)	● ● ●	●	3	1
4	Jaime Faria (POR)	● ●	● ●	2	2
4	Adam Walton (AUS)	● ●	● ●	2	2
4	Hady Habib (LIB)	●	● ● ●	1	3
4	Daniel Rincón (ESP)	●	● ● ●	1	3
4	Yuta Shimizu (JPN)	●	● ● ●	1	3
4	Marcelo Demoliner (BRA)		● ● ● ●	0	4
4	Karol Drzewiecki (POL)		● ● ● ●	0	4
4	Blake Ellis (AUS)		● ● ● ●	0	4
4	Jonathan Eysseric (FRA)		● ● ● ●	0	4
4	Trey Hilderbrand (USA)		● ● ● ●	0	4
4	Evan King (USA)		● ● ● ●	0	4
4	Saketh Myneni (IND)		● ● ● ●	0	4
4	Luke Saville (AUS)		● ● ● ●	0	4
4	Jakob Schnaitter (GER)		● ● ● ●	0	4
4	Matías Soto (CHI)		● ● ● ●	0	4
4	Reese Stalder (USA)		● ● ● ●	0	4
4	Sem Verbeek (NED)		● ● ● ●	0	4
4	Mark Wallner (GER)		● ● ● ●	0	4
3	Juan Manuel Cerúndolo (ARG)	● ● ●		3	0
3	Francisco Comesaña (ARG)	● ● ●		3	0
3	Hugo Dellien (BOL)	● ● ●		3	0
3	Lloyd Harris (RSA)	● ● ●		3	0
3	Jozef Kovalík (SVK)	● ● ●		3	0
3	Kamil Majchrzak (POL)	● ● ●		3	0
3	Giovanni Mpetshi Perricard (FRA)	● ● ●		3	0
3	Alexander Ritschard (SUI)	● ● ●		3	0
3	Learner Tien (USA)	● ● ●		3	0
3	Camilo Ugo Carabelli (ARG)	● ● ●		3	0
3	Valentin Vacherot (MON)	● ● ●		3	0
3	Otto Virtanen (FIN)	● ● ●		3	0
3	Andrea Collarini (ARG)	● ●	●	2	1
3	Gabriel Debru (FRA)	● ●	●	2	1
3	Tseng Chun-hsin (TPE)	● ●	●	2	1
3	Geoffrey Blancaneaux (FRA)	●	● ●	1	2
3	Murkel Dellien (BOL)	●	● ●	1	2
3	Henrique Rocha (POR)	●	● ●	1	2
3	Jurij Rodionov (AUT)	●	● ●	1	2
3	Nicolás Barrientos (COL)		● ● ●	0	3
3	Rithvik Choudary Bollipalli (IND)		● ● ●	0	3
3	Marco Bortolotti (ITA)		● ● ●	0	3
3	Julian Cash (GBR)		● ● ●	0	3
3	Robert Cash (USA)		● ● ●	0	3
3	Victor Vlad Cornea (ROU)		● ● ●	0	3
3	Guillermo Durán (ARG)		● ● ●	0	3
3	George Goldhoff (USA)		● ● ●	0	3
3	Cleeve Harper (CAN)		● ● ●	0	3
3	Niki Kaliyanda Poonacha (IND)		● ● ●	0	3
3	Alexander Merino (PER)		● ● ●	0	3
3	Christoph Negritu (GER)		● ● ●	0	3
3	Ramkumar Ramanathan (IND)		● ● ●	0	3
3	Miguel Ángel Reyes-Varela (MEX)		● ● ●	0	3
3	Bart Stevens (NED)		● ● ●	0	3
3	JJ Tracy (USA)		● ● ●	0	3
3	Takeru Yuzuki (JPN)		● ● ●	0	3
3	Marcelo Zormann (BRA)		● ● ●	0	3
2	Nishesh Basavareddy (USA)	● ●		2	0
2	Bu Yunchaokete (CHN)	● ●		2	0
2	Gonzalo Bueno (PER)	● ●		2	0
2	Roberto Carballés Baena (ESP)	● ●		2	0
2	Raphaël Collignon (BEL)	● ●		2	0
2	Matteo Gigante (ITA)	● ●		2	0
2	August Holmgren (DEN)	● ●		2	0
2	Maks Kaśnikowski (POL)	● ●		2	0
2	Thanasi Kokkinakis (AUS)	● ●		2	0
2	Vít Kopřiva (CZE)	● ●		2	0
2	Mitchell Krueger (USA)	● ●		2	0
2	Mikhail Kukushkin (KAZ)	● ●		2	0
2	Jérôme Kym (SUI)	● ●		2	0
2	Pedro Martínez (ESP)	● ●		2	0
2	Sumit Nagal (IND)	● ●		2	0
2	Stefano Napolitano (ITA)	● ●		2	0
2	Luca Nardi (ITA)	● ●		2	0
2	Francesco Passaro (ITA)	● ●		2	0
2	Lucas Pouille (FRA)	● ●		2	0
2	Leandro Riedi (SUI)	● ●		2	0
2	Roman Safiullin	● ●		2	0
2	Yasutaka Uchiyama (JPN)	● ●		2	0
2	Titouan Droguet (FRA)	●	●	1	1
2	João Fonseca (BRA)	●	●	1	1
2	Facundo Mena (ARG)	●	●	1	1
2	Nicolas Moreno de Alboran (USA)	●	●	1	1
2	Brandon Nakashima (USA)	●	●	1	1
2	Arthur Rinderknech (FRA)	●	●	1	1
2	Oriol Roca Batalla (ESP)	●	●	1	1
2	Dan Added (FRA)		● ●	0	2
2	Mateus Alves (BRA)		● ●	0	2
2	Romain Arneodo (MON)		● ●	0	2
2	Sriram Balaji (IND)		● ●	0	2
2	Andre Begemann (GER)		● ●	0	2
2	Filip Bergevi (SWE)		● ●	0	2
2	Charles Broom (GBR)		● ●	0	2
2	Francisco Cabral (POR)		● ●	0	2
2	Anirudh Chandrasekar (IND)		● ●	0	2
2	Daniel Cukierman (ISR)		● ●	0	2
2	Robert Galloway (USA)		● ●	0	2
2	Hans Hach Verdugo (MEX)		● ●	0	2
2	Benjamin Hassan (LIB)		● ●	0	2
2	Harri Heliövaara (FIN)		● ●	0	2
2	Ray Ho (TPE)		● ●	0	2
2	Conner Huertas del Pino (PER)		● ●	0	2
2	Arjun Kadhe (IND)		● ●	0	2
2	Vasil Kirkov (USA)		● ●	0	2
2	Benjamin Lock (ZIM)		● ●	0	2
2	Luis David Martínez (VEN)		● ●	0	2
2	Sergio Martos Gornés (ESP)		● ●	0	2
2	Nam Ji-sung (KOR)		● ●	0	2
2	Henry Patten (GBR)		● ●	0	2
2	Jakub Paul (SUI)		● ●	0	2
2	John Peers (AUS)		● ●	0	2
2	David Pel (NED)		● ●	0	2
2	Hunter Reese (USA)		● ●	0	2
2	Arthur Reymond (FRA)		● ●	0	2
2	Finn Reynolds (NZL)		● ●	0	2
2	Fernando Romboli (BRA)		● ●	0	2
2	Vitaliy Sachko (UKR)		● ●	0	2
2	Benjamin Sigouin (CAN)		● ●	0	2
2	David Stevenson (GBR)		● ●	0	2
2	Kaichi Uchida (JPN)		● ●	0	2
2	Mick Veldheer (NED)		● ●	0	2
2	Seita Watanabe (JPN)		● ●	0	2
1	Duje Ajduković (CRO)	●		1	0
1	Adrian Andreev (BUL)	●		1	0
1	Federico Arnaboldi (ITA)	●		1	0
1	Facundo Bagnis (ARG)	●		1	0
1	Tomás Barrios Vera (CHI)	●		1	0
1	Nikoloz Basilashvili (GEO)	●		1	0
1	Ričardas Berankis (LTU)	●		1	0
1	Zizou Bergs (BEL)	●		1	0
1	Robin Bertrand (FRA)	●		1	0
1	Blaise Bicknell (JAM)	●		1	0
1	Alexander Blockx (BEL)	●		1	0
1	Nuno Borges (POR)	●		1	0
1	Gijs Brouwer (NED)	●		1	0
1	Edas Butvilas (LTU)	●		1	0
1	Murphy Cassone (USA)	●		1	0
1	Arthur Cazaux (FRA)	●		1	0
1	Clément Chidekh (FRA)	●		1	0
1	Jan Choinski (GBR)	●		1	0
1	Enzo Couacaud (FRA)	●		1	0
1	Taro Daniel (JPN)	●		1	0
1	Luciano Darderi (ITA)	●		1	0
1	Jesper de Jong (NED)	●		1	0
1	Guy den Ouden (NED)	●		1	0
1	Gabriel Diallo (CAN)	●		1	0
1	James Duckworth (AUS)	●		1	0
1	Antoine Escoffier (FRA)	●		1	0
1	Christopher Eubanks (USA)	●		1	0
1	Juan Pablo Ficovich (ARG)	●		1	0
1	Arthur Fils (FRA)	●		1	0
1	Fabio Fognini (ITA)	●		1	0
1	Richard Gasquet (FRA)	●		1	0
1	Hugo Gaston (FRA)	●		1	0
1	Vilius Gaubas (LTU)	●		1	0
1	David Goffin (BEL)	●		1	0
1	Borna Gojo (CRO)	●		1	0
1	Álvaro Guillén Meza (ECU)	●		1	0
1	Nick Hardt (DOM)	●		1	0
1	Gustavo Heide (BRA)	●		1	0
1	Pierre-Hugues Herbert (FRA)	●		1	0
1	Rinky Hijikata (AUS)	●		1	0
1	Marc-Andrea Hüsler (SUI)	●		1	0
1	Omar Jasika (AUS)	●		1	0
1	Ergi Kırkın (TUR)	●		1	0
1	Dominik Koepfer (GER)	●		1	0
1	Dimitar Kuzmanov (BUL)	●		1	0
1	Patrick Kypson (USA)	●		1	0
1	Martín Landaluce (ESP)	●		1	0
1	Alejo Lorenzo Lingua Lavallén (ARG)	●		1	0
1	Gianluca Mager (ITA)	●		1	0
1	Aidan Mayo (USA)	●		1	0
1	Mackenzie McDonald (USA)	●		1	0
1	Nicolás Mejía (COL)	●		1	0
1	Elmer Møller (DEN)	●		1	0
1	Alejandro Moro Cañas (ESP)	●		1	0
1	Alexandre Müller (FRA)	●		1	0
1	Jaume Munar (ESP)	●		1	0
1	Naoki Nakagawa (JPN)	●		1	0
1	Mariano Navone (ARG)	●		1	0
1	Kei Nishikori (JPN)	●		1	0
1	Christopher O'Connell (AUS)	●		1	0
1	Gonzalo Oliveira (VEN)	●		1	0
1	Zsombor Piros (HUN)	●		1	0
1	Ethan Quinn (USA)	●		1	0
1	Albert Ramos Viñolas (ESP)	●		1	0
1	Mats Rosenkranz (GER)	●		1	0
1	Valentin Royer (FRA)	●		1	0
1	Rei Sakamoto (JPN)	●		1	0
1	Joel Schwärzler (AUT)	●		1	0
1	Sho Shimabukuro (JPN)	●		1	0
1	Timofey Skatov (KAZ)	●		1	0
1	Henri Squire (GER)	●		1	0
1	Carlos Taberner (ESP)	●		1	0
1	Alejandro Tabilo (CHI)	●		1	0
1	Thiago Agustín Tirante (ARG)	●		1	0
1	Juan Bautista Torres (ARG)	●		1	0
1	Marco Trungelliti (ARG)	●		1	0
1	Daniel Vallejo (PAR)	●		1	0
1	Juan Pablo Varillas (PER)	●		1	0
1	Jiří Veselý (CZE)	●		1	0
1	Wu Tung-lin (TPE)	●		1	0
1	Wu Yibing (CHN)	●		1	0
1	Egor Agafonov		●	0	1
1	Juan Carlos Aguilar (CAN)		●	0	1
1	Andrés Andrade (ECU)		●	0	1
1	Boris Arias (BOL)		●	0	1
1	Aleksandre Bakshi (GEO)		●	0	1
1	Javier Barranco Cosano (ESP)		●	0	1
1	Florent Bax (FRA)		●	0	1
1	Mattia Bellucci (ITA)		●	0	1
1	Rémy Bertola (SUI)		●	0	1
1	Alex Bolt (AUS)		●	0	1
1	Luís Britto (BRA)		●	0	1
1	Íñigo Cervantes (ESP)		●	0	1
1	Chung Yun-seong (KOR)		●	0	1
1	Roberto Cid Subervi (DOM)		●	0	1
1	Jay Clarke (GBR)		●	0	1
1	Oliver Crawford (GBR)		●	0	1
1	Cezar Crețu (ROU)		●	0	1
1	Sadio Doumbia (FRA)		●	0	1
1	Scott Duncan (GBR)		●	0	1
1	Yankı Erel (TUR)		●	0	1
1	Gonzalo Escobar (ECU)		●	0	1
1	Arthur Fery (GBR)		●	0	1
1	Jonáš Forejtek (CZE)		●	0	1
1	Constantin Frantzen (GER)		●	0	1
1	Simon Freund (SWE)		●	0	1
1	André Göransson (SWE)		●	0	1
1	Sascha Gueymard Wayenburg (FRA)		●	0	1
1	Robin Haase (NED)		●	0	1
1	Quentin Halys (FRA)		●	0	1
1	Patrick Harper (AUS)		●	0	1
1	Diego Hidalgo (ECU)		●	0	1
1	Max Houkes (NED)		●	0	1
1	Arklon Huertas del Pino (PER)		●	0	1
1	Johannes Ingildsen (DEN)		●	0	1
1	Pruchya Isaro (THA)		●	0	1
1	Hendrik Jebens (GER)		●	0	1
1	Ben Jones (GBR)		●	0	1
1	Miloš Karol (SVK)		●	0	1
1	Mac Kiger (USA)		●	0	1
1	Cannon Kingsley (USA)		●	0	1
1	Zdeněk Kolář (CZE)		●	0	1
1	Oleksii Krutykh (UKR)		●	0	1
1	Alex Lawson (USA)		●	0	1
1	Lee Jea-moon (KOR)		●	0	1
1	Ivan Liutarevich		●	0	1
1	Courtney John Lock (ZIM)		●	0	1
1	Vladyslav Manafov (UKR)		●	0	1
1	Matteo Martineau (FRA)		●	0	1
1	Lucas Miedler (AUT)		●	0	1
1	Denys Molchanov (UKR)		●	0	1
1	Johannus Monday (GBR)		●	0	1
1	Aleksandr Nedovyesov (KAZ)		●	0	1
1	Jeevan Nedunchezhiyan (IND)		●	0	1
1	Patrik Niklas-Salminen (FIN)		●	0	1
1	Neil Oberleitner (AUT)		●	0	1
1	Renzo Olivo (ARG)		●	0	1
1	Joshua Paris (GBR)		●	0	1
1	Bogdan Pavel (ROU)		●	0	1
1	David Pichler (AUT)		●	0	1
1	Calum Puttergill (AUS)		●	0	1
1	Fabien Reboul (FRA)		●	0	1
1	Cristian Rodríguez (COL)		●	0	1
1	Ivan Sabanov (SRB)		●	0	1
1	Matej Sabanov (SRB)		●	0	1
1	Pedro Sakamoto (BRA)		●	0	1
1	Carlos Sánchez Jover (ESP)		●	0	1
1	Abdullah Shelbayh (JOR)		●	0	1
1	Ilia Simakin		●	0	1
1	Colin Sinclair (NMI)		●	0	1
1	Karan Singh (IND)		●	0	1
1	John-Patrick Smith (AUS)		●	0	1
1	Song Min-kyu (KOR)		●	0	1
1	Rubin Statham (NZL)		●	0	1
1	Roy Stepanov (ISR)		●	0	1
1	Sun Fajing (CHN)		●	0	1
1	Clément Tabur (FRA)		●	0	1
1	Te Rigele (CHN)		●	0	1
1	Petros Tsitsipas (GRE)		●	0	1
1	Li Tu (AUS)		●	0	1
1	Andrés Urrea (COL)		●	0	1
1	Volodymyr Uzhylovskyi (UKR)		●	0	1
1	David Vega Hernández (ESP)		●	0	1
1	Gonzalo Villanueva (ARG)		●	0	1
1	Michael Vrbenský (CZE)		●	0	1
1	Wang Aoran (CHN)		●	0	1
1	Federico Zeballos (BOL)		●	0	1

=== Titles won by nation ===
Total	Nation	S	D
54	United States (USA)	18	36
50	France (FRA)	24	26
35	Argentina (ARG)	22	13
30	Australia (AUS)	9	21
29	Great Britain (GBR)	5	24
21	Japan (JPN)	10	11
19	Spain (ESP)	11	8
18	Netherlands (NED)	3	15
16	Italy (ITA)	12	4
16	Brazil (BRA)	2	14
14	India (IND)	2	12
13	Germany (GER)	3	10
11	Switzerland (SUI)	8	3
11	Poland (POL)	5	6
10	Czech Republic (CZE)	3	7
8	Portugal (POR)	4	4
8	Peru (PER)	3	5
7	Bolivia (BOL)	4	3
7	Canada (CAN)	1	6
6	Bosnia and Herzegovina (BIH)	6	0
6	Chinese Taipei (TPE)	3	3
6	Finland (FIN)	3	3
6	Austria (AUT)	2	4
6	Chile (CHI)	2	4
6	Colombia (COL)	1	5
6	Lebanon (LIB)	1	5
5	Belgium (BEL)	5	0
5	China (CHN)	3	2
5	Monaco (MON)	3	2
5	Mexico (MEX)	0	5
5	Tunisia (TUN)	0	5
5	Ukraine (UKR)	0	5
4	Denmark (DEN)	3	1
4	Kazakhstan (KAZ)	3	1
4	Slovakia (SVK)	3	1
4	Ecuador (ECU)	1	3
4	Romania (ROU)	0	4
4	South Korea (KOR)	0	4
4	Sweden (SWE)	0	4
3	Lithuania (LTU)	3	0
3	South Africa (RSA)	3	0
3	Venezuela (VEN)	1	2
3	Israel (ISR)	0	3
3	New Zealand (NZL)	0	3
2	Bulgaria (BUL)	2	0
2	Croatia (CRO)	2	0
2	Dominican Republic (DOM)	1	1
2	Georgia (GEO)	1	1
2	Turkey (TUR)	1	1
2	Zimbabwe (ZIM)	0	2
1	Hungary (HUN)	1	0
1	Jamaica (JAM)	1	0
1	Paraguay (PAR)	1	0
1	Greece (GRE)	0	1
1	Jordan (JOR)	0	1
1	Northern Mariana Islands (NMI)	0	1
1	Serbia (SRB)	0	1
1	Thailand (THA)	0	1

== Point distribution ==
Points are awarded as follows:

Tournament category	Singles									Doubles				
Tournament category	W	F	SF	QF	R16	R32	Q	Q2	Q1	W	F	SF	QF	R16
Challenger 175	175	90	50	25	13	0	6	3	0	175	100	60	32	0
Challenger 125	125	64	35	16	8	0	5	3	0	125	75	45	25	0
Challenger 100	100	50	25	14	7	0	4	2	0	100	60	36	20	0
Challenger 75	75	44	22	12	6	0	4	2	0	75	50	30	16	0
Challenger 50	50	25	14	8	4	0	3	1	0	50	30	17	9	0

== See also ==
- 2024 WTA 125 tournaments
- 2024 ATP Tour
- 2024 ITF Men's World Tennis Tour
