= 2023 Nonthaburi Challenger II – Doubles =

Doubles
- 2023 Nonthaburi Challenger II

Final
- Champions: (India) Yuki Bhambri (India) Saketh Myneni
- Runners-up: (Indonesia) Christopher Rungkat (Australia) Akira Santillan
- Score: 2–6, 7–6^{(9–7)}, [14–12]

Events
Singles	Doubles
← 2023 ·	Nonthaburi Challenger	· 2023 →

Marek Gengel and Adam Pavlásek were the defending champions but lost in the semifinals to Yuki Bhambri and Saketh Myneni.

Bhambri and Myneni won the title after defeating Christopher Rungkat and Akira Santillan 2–6, 7–6^{(9–7)}, [14–12] in the final.

== Seeds ==
1. (India) Yuki Bhambri / (India) Saketh Myneni (champions)
2. (Serbia) Ivan Sabanov / (Serbia) Matej Sabanov (quarterfinals)
3. (United States) Robert Galloway / (Mexico) Hans Hach Verdugo (first round)
4. (Czech Republic) Marek Gengel / (Czech Republic) Adam Pavlásek (semifinals)

== Draw ==
=== Key ===
- Q = Qualifier
- WC = Wild card
- LL = Lucky loser
- Alt = Alternate
- SE = Special exempt
- PR = Protected ranking
- ITF = ITF entry
- JE = Junior exempt
- w/o = Walkover
- r = Retired
- d = Defaulted
- SR = Special ranking

First round
1	(India) Y Bhambri (India) S Myneni	7	6
(Czech Republic) Z Kolář (Australia) J Taylor	5	3
(France) D Added (Belgium) M Geerts	6	6
WC	(Thailand) M Jones (Thailand) P Kovapitukted	2	3
4	(Czech Republic) M Gengel (Czech Republic) A Pavlásek	5	6	[10]
WC	(Thailand) P Isaro (Thailand) T Suksumrarn	7	3	[7]
(India) A Chandrasekar (India) VS Prashanth	6	7
(United States) E King (United States) T Sandgren	4	5
(South Korea) J-s Nam (South Korea) M-k Song	6	6
(Japan) T Matsui (Japan) K Uesugi	2	4
(France) L Sanchez (Canada) K Stevenson	4	6	[10]
3	(United States) R Galloway (Mexico) H Hach Verdugo	6	3	[3]
(Indonesia) C Rungkat (Australia) A Santillan	6	6
(India) A Kadhe (Brazil) F Romboli	4	2
Alt	(Lebanon) B Hassan (Austria) D Novak	3	3
2	(Serbia) I Sabanov (Serbia) M Sabanov	6	6

Quarterfinals
1	(India) Y Bhambri (India) S Myneni	4	7	[10]
(France) D Added (Belgium) M Geerts	6	5	[5]
4	(Czech Republic) M Gengel (Czech Republic) A Pavlásek	6	6^{5}	[10]
(India) A Chandrasekar (India) VS Prashanth	4	7^{7}	[8]
(South Korea) J-s Nam (South Korea) M-k Song	7^{8}	6
(France) L Sanchez (Canada) K Stevenson	6^{6}	3
(Indonesia) C Rungkat (Australia) A Santillan	6^{6}	6	[10]
2	(Serbia) I Sabanov (Serbia) M Sabanov	7^{8}	4	[7]

Semifinals
1	(India) Y Bhambri (India) S Myneni	6	7^{7}
4	(Czech Republic) M Gengel (Czech Republic) A Pavlásek	3	6^{3}
(South Korea) J-s Nam (South Korea) M-k Song	1	7^{8}	[4]
(Indonesia) C Rungkat (Australia) A Santillan	6	6^{6}	[10]

Final
1	(India) Y Bhambri (India) S Myneni	2	7^{9}	[14]
(Indonesia) C Rungkat (Australia) A Santillan	6	6^{7}	[12]
