= 2025 Nonthaburi Challenger II – Doubles =

Doubles
- 2025 Nonthaburi Challenger II

Final
- Champions: (Chinese Taipei) Ray Ho (Austria) Neil Oberleitner
- Runners-up: (Israel) Daniel Cukierman (United Kingdom) Joshua Paris
- Score: 6–4, 7–6^{(7–5)}

Events
Singles	Doubles
← 2025 ·	Nonthaburi Challenger	· 2025 →

Kokoro Isomura and Rio Noguchi were the defending champions but chose not to defend their title.

Ray Ho and Neil Oberleitner won the title, after defeating Daniel Cukierman and Joshua Paris 6–4, 7–6^{(7–5)} in the final.

== Seeds ==
1. (Germany) Jakob Schnaitter / (Germany) Mark Wallner (first round)
2. (India) Anirudh Chandrasekar / (Poland) Karol Drzewiecki (first round)
3. (India) Jeevan Nedunchezhiyan / (India) Vijay Sundar Prashanth (quarterfinals)
4. (Finland) Patrik Niklas-Salminen / (United States) Reese Stalder (semifinals)

== Draw ==
=== Key ===
- Q = Qualifier
- WC = Wild card
- LL = Lucky loser
- Alt = Alternate
- ITF = ITF entry
- PR = Protected ranking
- SR = Special ranking
- SE = Special exempt
- JE = Junior exempt
- JR = Junior Accelerator Programme entrant
- CO = College Accelerator Programme entrant
- NG = Next Gen Accelerator Program entrant
- w/o = Walkover
- r = Retired
- d = Defaulted

=== Draw ===
First round
1	(Germany) J Schnaitter (Germany) M Wallner	6	3	[4]
(Japan) S Watanabe (Japan) T Yuzuki	4	6	[10]
(Philippines) FC Alcantara (United States) E King	6	4	[10]
(India) N Kaliyanda Poonacha (India) S Myneni	4	6	[8]
3	(India) J Nedunchezhiyan (India) VS Prashanth	7^{7}	6
WC	(Thailand) Pawit Sornlaksup (Thailand) T Suksumrarn	6^{3}	4
WC	(Thailand) M Jones (Thailand) W Trongcharoenchaikul	1	5
(Israel) D Cukierman (United Kingdom) J Paris	6	7
(Switzerland) R Bertola (France) G Blancaneaux	6	7^{7}
(Thailand) P Isaro (China) A Wang	4	6^{1}
(Zimbabwe) CJ Lock (Italy) F Maestrelli	6^{3}	5
4	(Finland) P Niklas-Salminen (United States) R Stalder	7^{7}	7
(South Korea) J-s Nam (Japan) K Uesugi	6	6^{5}	[2]
(Chinese Taipei) R Ho (Austria) N Oberleitner	4	7^{7}	[10]
(Australia) B Bayldon (Switzerland) J Paul	7^{7}	6
2	(India) A Chandrasekar (Poland) K Drzewiecki	6^{4}	3

Quarterfinals
(Japan) S Watanabe (Japan) T Yuzuki	6	2	[10]
(Philippines) FC Alcantara (United States) E King	3	6	[5]
3	(India) J Nedunchezhiyan (India) VS Prashanth	2	0
(Israel) D Cukierman (United Kingdom) J Paris	6	6
(Switzerland) R Bertola (France) G Blancaneaux	2	6^{5}
4	(Finland) P Niklas-Salminen (United States) R Stalder	6	7^{7}
(Chinese Taipei) R Ho (Austria) N Oberleitner	6	7
(Australia) B Bayldon (Switzerland) J Paul	3	5

Semifinals
(Japan) S Watanabe (Japan) T Yuzuki	3	7^{19}	[5]
(Israel) D Cukierman (United Kingdom) J Paris	6	6^{17}	[10]
4	(Finland) P Niklas-Salminen (United States) R Stalder	3	6	[3]
(Chinese Taipei) R Ho (Austria) N Oberleitner	6	3	[10]

Final
(Israel) D Cukierman (United Kingdom) J Paris	4	6^{5}
(Chinese Taipei) R Ho (Austria) N Oberleitner	6	7^{7}
