= 2023 Nonthaburi Challenger III – Singles =

Singles
- 2023 Nonthaburi Challenger III

Final
- Champion: (Japan) Sho Shimabukuro
- Runner-up: (France) Arthur Cazaux
- Score: 6–2, 7–5

Events
Singles	Doubles
← 2023 ·	Nonthaburi Challenger	· 2024 →

Arthur Cazaux was the defending champion but lost in the final to Sho Shimabukuro.

Shimabukuro won the title after defeating Cazaux 6–2, 7–5 in the final.

== Seeds ==
1. (Australia) James Duckworth (second round)
2. (Switzerland) Alexander Ritschard (first round)
3. (France) Antoine Escoffier (quarterfinals, retired)
4. (France) Evan Furness (first round)
5. (United Kingdom) Paul Jubb (first round)
6. (Romania) Nicholas David Ionel (first round)
7. (Germany) Peter Gojowczyk (withdrew)
8. (Czech Republic) Zdeněk Kolář (quarterfinals)

== Draw ==
Key

- Q = Qualifier
- WC = Wild card
- LL = Lucky loser
- Alt = Alternate
- ITF = ITF entry
- PR = Protected ranking
- SR = Special ranking
- SE = Special exempt
- JE = Junior exempt
- JR = Junior Accelerator Programme entrant
- CO = College Accelerator Programme entrant
- NG = Next Gen Accelerator Program entrant
- w/o = Walkover
- r = Retired
- d = Defaulted

=== Finals ===
Semifinals
(Japan) Sho Shimabukuro	6	7
(South Korea) Hong Seong-chan	2	5
LL	(Italy) Giovanni Fonio	5	3
Q	(France) Arthur Cazaux	7	6

Final
(Japan) Sho Shimabukuro	6	7
Q	(France) Arthur Cazaux	2	5

=== Top half ===
First round
1	(Australia) J Duckworth	6	6
Alt	(Kazakhstan) B Zhukayev	3	4
(Japan) S Shimabukuro	6	6
(Germany) M Moraing	3	2
(United Kingdom) J Choinski	6	6
WC	(Thailand) J Navasirisomboon	1	3
Q	E Donskoy	6	6^{7}	2
8	(Czech Republic) Z Kolář	3	7^{9}	6
4	(France) E Furness	1	1
(Poland) K Żuk	6	6
WC	(Thailand) Y Charoenphon	3	1
(Belgium) M Geerts	6	6
(South Korea) S-c Hong	6	6
WC	(Thailand) K Samrej	4	4
(Vietnam) NH Lý	6	7^{7}
6	(Romania) ND Ionel	1	6^{5}

Second round
1	(Australia) J Duckworth	6^{4}	6	1
(Japan) S Shimabukuro	7^{7}	4	6
(United Kingdom) J Choinski	4	6	0
8	(Czech Republic) Z Kolář	6	3	6
(Poland) K Żuk	3	4
(Belgium) M Geerts	6	6
(South Korea) S-c Hong	6	7^{7}
(Vietnam) NH Lý	2	6^{3}

Quarterfinals
(Japan) S Shimabukuro	6	6^{7}	6
8	(Czech Republic) Z Kolář	0	7^{9}	2
(Belgium) M Geerts	1	5
(South Korea) S-c Hong	6	7

Semifinals
(Japan) S Shimabukuro	6	7
(South Korea) S-c Hong	2	5

=== Bottom half ===
First round
LL	(Italy) G Fonio	6	7
(Kazakhstan) D Yevseyev	2	5
(Japan) H Moriya	0	4
(Lebanon) B Hassan	6	6
(Poland) D Michalski	6	6
Q	(Czech Republic) D Palán	4	2
Alt	(Italy) S Travaglia	1	6^{4}
3	(France) A Escoffier	6	7^{7}
5	(United Kingdom) P Jubb	6	4	5
Q	(Japan) S Mochizuki	2	6	7
(France) D Added	6	4	1
(United States) T Sandgren	1	6	6
Q	(France) A Cazaux	7^{7}	6
Q	(United Kingdom) S Parker	6^{1}	4
Q	(Czech Republic) J Menšík	7^{7}	7
2	(Switzerland) A Ritschard	6^{5}	5

Second round
LL	(Italy) G Fonio	6^{4}	6	6
(Lebanon) B Hassan	7^{7}	4	2
(Poland) D Michalski	3	6	1
3	(France) A Escoffier	6	4	6
Q	(Japan) S Mochizuki	3	1
(United States) T Sandgren	6	6
Q	(France) A Cazaux	6	6
Q	(Czech Republic) J Menšík	3	0

Quarterfinals
LL	(Italy) G Fonio	7	6^{5}	2
3	(France) A Escoffier	5	7^{7}	1^{r}
(United States) T Sandgren	6^{4}	4
Q	(France) A Cazaux	7^{7}	6

Semifinals
LL	(Italy) G Fonio	5	3
Q	(France) A Cazaux	7	6
