= 2022 Nonthaburi Challenger – Doubles =

Doubles
- 2022 Nonthaburi Challenger

Final
- Champions: Evgeny Donskoy; Alibek Kachmazov
- Runners-up: (South Korea) Nam Ji-sung (South Korea) Song Min-kyu
- Score: 6–3, 1–6, [10–7]

Events
Singles	Doubles
Nonthaburi Challenger	· 2022 →

This was the first edition of the tournament.

Evgeny Donskoy and Alibek Kachmazov won the title after defeating Nam Ji-sung and Song Min-kyu 6–3, 1–6, [10–7] in the final.

== Seeds ==
1. (Chinese Taipei) Hsu Yu-hsiou / (Zimbabwe) Benjamin Lock (withdrew)
2. (Australia) Tristan Schoolkate / (Australia) Dane Sweeny (semifinals)
3. (South Korea) Nam Ji-sung / (South Korea) Song Min-kyu (final)
4. (Chinese Taipei) Ray Ho / (Kazakhstan) Grigoriy Lomakin (first round)

== Draw ==
=== Key ===
- Q = Qualifier
- WC = Wild card
- LL = Lucky loser
- Alt = Alternate
- SE = Special exempt
- PR = Protected ranking
- ITF = ITF entry
- JE = Junior exempt
- w/o = Walkover
- r = Retired
- d = Defaulted
- SR = Special ranking

First round
Alt	(Uzbekistan) S Fomin (Uzbekistan) D Istomin	4	5
WC	(Thailand) P Isaro (Thailand) T Suksumrarn	6	7
WC	(Thailand) Y Charoenphon (Thailand) K Samrej	2	6	[10]
(Australia) A Santillan (Kazakhstan) B Zhukayev	6	2	[8]
3	(South Korea) J-s Nam (South Korea) M-k Song	6	7^{7}
(South Korea) S-c Hong (Japan) Y Shimizu	4	6^{4}
(Japan) T Matsui (Japan) K Uesugi	6^{8}	7^{7}	[10]
(India) A Chandrasekar (India) V Vardhan	7^{10}	6^{2}	[4]
E Donskoy; A Kachmazov	7^{7}	6
(Israel) Y Oliel (Kazakhstan) D Yevseyev	6^{4}	3
(France) K Jacquet (Monaco) V Vacherot	6	6
4	(Chinese Taipei) R Ho (Kazakhstan) G Lomakin	4	3
(United Kingdom) C Broom (Israel) D Cukierman	6	7
(Germany) N Kuhn (Ukraine) I Marchenko	0	5
(United Kingdom) B Harris (Zimbabwe) CJ Lock	5	3
2	(Australia) T Schoolkate (Australia) D Sweeny	7	6

Quarterfinals
WC	(Thailand) P Isaro (Thailand) T Suksumrarn	6	4	[10]
WC	(Thailand) Y Charoenphon (Thailand) K Samrej	2	6	[8]
3	(South Korea) J-s Nam (South Korea) M-k Song	6	6
(Japan) T Matsui (Japan) K Uesugi	4	4
E Donskoy; A Kachmazov	7^{7}	6
(France) K Jacquet (Monaco) V Vacherot	6^{1}	1
(United Kingdom) C Broom (Israel) D Cukierman	4	3
2	(Australia) T Schoolkate (Australia) D Sweeny	6	6

Semifinals
WC	(Thailand) P Isaro (Thailand) T Suksumrarn	5	5
3	(South Korea) J-s Nam (South Korea) M-k Song	7	7
E Donskoy; A Kachmazov	1	7	[10]
2	(Australia) T Schoolkate (Australia) D Sweeny	6	5	[4]

Final
3	(South Korea) J-s Nam (South Korea) M-k Song	3	6	[7]
E Donskoy; A Kachmazov	6	1	[10]
