= 2025 Nonthaburi Challenger III – Doubles =

Doubles
- 2025 Nonthaburi Challenger III

Final
- Champions: (Chinese Taipei) Ray Ho (Austria) Neil Oberleitner
- Runners-up: (Thailand) Pruchya Isaro (China) Wang Aoran
- Score: 6–3, 6–4

Events
Singles	Doubles
← 2025 ·	Nonthaburi Challenger	· 2026 →

Ray Ho and Neil Oberleitner were the defending champions and successfully defended their title after defeating Pruchya Isaro and Wang Aoran 6–3, 6–4 in the final.

== Seeds ==
1. (South Korea) Nam Ji-sung / (Japan) Kaito Uesugi (quarterfinals)
2. (India) Niki Kaliyanda Poonacha / (India) Saketh Myneni (quarterfinals)
3. (Australia) Blake Bayldon / (Switzerland) Jakub Paul (first round)
4. (Israel) Daniel Cukierman / (United Kingdom) Joshua Paris (quarterfinals)

== Draw ==
=== Key ===
- Q = Qualifier
- WC = Wild card
- LL = Lucky loser
- Alt = Alternate
- ITF = ITF entry
- PR = Protected ranking
- SR = Special ranking
- SE = Special exempt
- JE = Junior exempt
- JR = Junior Accelerator Programme entrant
- CO = College Accelerator Programme entrant
- NG = Next Gen Accelerator Program entrant
- w/o = Walkover
- r = Retired
- d = Defaulted

=== Draw ===
First round
1	(South Korea) J-s Nam (Japan) K Uesugi	6	6
(Switzerland) R Bertola (France) A Escoffier	3	3
WC	(Thailand) Pawit Sornlaksup (Thailand) T Suksumrarn	6	3	[5]
(Chinese Taipei) R Ho (Austria) N Oberleitner	4	6	[10]
3	(Australia) B Bayldon (Switzerland) J Paul	6^{4}	7^{7}	[8]
(Chinese Taipei) Y-h Hsu (China) F Sun	7^{7}	6^{4}	[10]
WC	(Thailand) M Jones (Thailand) W Trongcharoenchaikul	3	6^{7}
(Philippines) FC Alcantara (Czech Republic) Z Kolář	6	7^{9}
(Romania) FC Jianu (Uzbekistan) K Sultanov	4	4
(Thailand) P Isaro (China) A Wang	6	6
(Zimbabwe) CJ Lock; M Sharipov	3	4
4	(Israel) D Cukierman (United Kingdom) J Paris	6	6
(France) E Couacaud (Canada) K Stevenson	6	0	[3]
2	(India) N Kaliyanda Poonacha (India) S Myneni	4	6	[10]

Quarterfinals
1	(South Korea) J-s Nam (Japan) K Uesugi	4	1
(Chinese Taipei) R Ho (Austria) N Oberleitner	6	6
(Chinese Taipei) Y-h Hsu (China) F Sun	7	6
(Philippines) FC Alcantara (Czech Republic) Z Kolář	5	2
(Thailand) P Isaro (China) A Wang	2	7^{7}	[10]
4	(Israel) D Cukierman (United Kingdom) J Paris	6	6^{5}	[8]
(France) G Blancaneaux (France) C Denolly	6	7^{7}
2	(India) N Kaliyanda Poonacha (India) S Myneni	4	6^{4}

Semifinals
(Chinese Taipei) R Ho (Austria) N Oberleitner	6	6
(Chinese Taipei) Y-h Hsu (China) F Sun	3	2
(Thailand) P Isaro (China) A Wang	6	6
(France) G Blancaneaux (France) C Denolly	3	4

Final
(Chinese Taipei) R Ho (Austria) N Oberleitner	6	6
(Thailand) P Isaro (China) A Wang	3	4
