= 2023 Nonthaburi Challenger – Singles =

Singles
- 2023 Nonthaburi Challenger

Final
- Champion: (Austria) Dennis Novak
- Runner-up: (Chinese Taipei) Wu Tung-lin
- Score: 6–4, 6–4

Events
Singles	Doubles
- Nonthaburi Challenger

Stuart Parker was the defending champion but lost in the qualifying competition to Giovanni Fonio.

Dennis Novak won the title after defeating Wu Tung-lin 6–4, 6–4 in the final.

== Seeds ==
1. (Hungary) Fábián Marozsán (second round)
2. (Austria) Dennis Novak (champion)
3. (Chinese Taipei) Wu Tung-lin (final)
4. (France) Antoine Escoffier (semifinals)
5. (Italy) Gianluca Mager (first round)
6. (United Kingdom) Paul Jubb (first round)
7. (Australia) Max Purcell (quarterfinals)
8. (Chinese Taipei) Hsu Yu-hsiou (quarterfinals)

== Draw ==
Key

- Q = Qualifier
- WC = Wild card
- LL = Lucky loser
- Alt = Alternate
- ITF = ITF entry
- PR = Protected ranking
- SR = Special ranking
- SE = Special exempt
- JE = Junior exempt
- JR = Junior Accelerator Programme entrant
- CO = College Accelerator Programme entrant
- NG = Next Gen Accelerator Program entrant
- w/o = Walkover
- r = Retired
- d = Defaulted

=== Finals ===
Semifinals
(South Africa) Lloyd Harris	4	5
3	(Chinese Taipei) Wu Tung-lin	6	7
4	(France) Antoine Escoffier	3	2
2	(Austria) Dennis Novak	6	6

Final
3	(Chinese Taipei) Wu Tung-lin	4	4
2	(Austria) Dennis Novak	6	6

=== Top half ===
First round
1	(Hungary) F Marozsán	6	6
WC	(Thailand) P Kovapitukted	3	3
(Lebanon) B Hassan	2	5
(South Africa) L Harris	6	7
(Argentina) M Trungelliti	5	2
Q	(Australia) D Kelly	7	6
(Japan) H Moriya	3	2
8	(Chinese Taipei) Y-h Hsu	6	6
3	(Chinese Taipei) T-l Wu	6	6
WC	(Thailand) T Suksumrarn	4	1
(Japan) Y Uchiyama	6	6
WC	(Thailand) M Jones	4	4
(France) V Royer	4	6	2
Q	(United States) A Ayeni	6	3	6
Q	E Donskoy	6	7^{7}
6	(United Kingdom) P Jubb	1	6^{5}

Second round
1	(Hungary) F Marozsán	6	0	3
(South Africa) L Harris	3	6	6
Q	(Australia) D Kelly	2	2
8	(Chinese Taipei) Y-h Hsu	6	6
3	(Chinese Taipei) T-l Wu	6^{4}	7	6
(Japan) Y Uchiyama	7^{7}	5	4
Q	(United States) A Ayeni	4	4
Q	E Donskoy	6	6

Quarterfinals
(South Africa) L Harris	6^{7}	6	6
8	(Chinese Taipei) Y-h Hsu	7^{9}	3	4
3	(Chinese Taipei) T-l Wu	7	3	6
Q	E Donskoy	5	6	3

Semifinals
(South Africa) L Harris	4	5
3	(Chinese Taipei) T-l Wu	6	7

=== Bottom half ===
First round
7	(Australia) M Purcell	6	6
(Italy) S Travaglia	2	4
(Germany) M Moraing	7	6^{5}	6
Q	(France) L Pouille	5	7^{7}	3
(Japan) S Shimabukuro	6	3	6
(Kazakhstan) B Zhukayev	4	6	4
(Japan) S Mochizuki	4	7^{7}	2
4	(France) A Escoffier	6	6^{5}	6
5	(Italy) G Mager	3	7^{8}	3
Q	(Germany) H Squire	6	6^{6}	6
(Czech Republic) M Gengel	6	6^{4}	6
(United States) T Sandgren	4	7^{7}	1
Q	(Italy) G Fonio	5	7^{7}	7^{9}
(Argentina) TA Tirante	7	6^{3}	6^{7}
(France) D Added	2	2
2	(Austria) D Novak	6	6

Second round
7	(Australia) M Purcell	7^{7}	6
(Germany) M Moraing	6^{5}	4
(Japan) S Shimabukuro	6	6^{6}	3
4	(France) A Escoffier	2	7^{8}	6
Q	(Germany) H Squire	4	3
(Czech Republic) M Gengel	6	6
Q	(Italy) G Fonio	2	1
2	(Austria) D Novak	6	6

Quarterfinals
7	(Australia) M Purcell	2	6^{8}
4	(France) A Escoffier	6	7^{10}
(Czech Republic) M Gengel	3	7^{7}	3
2	(Austria) D Novak	6	6^{5}	6

Semifinals
4	(France) A Escoffier	3	2
2	(Austria) D Novak	6	6
