= 2022 Nonthaburi Challenger II – Doubles =

Doubles
- 2022 Nonthaburi Challenger II

Final
- Champions: (Zimbabwe) Benjamin Lock (Japan) Yuta Shimizu
- Runners-up: (Philippines) Francis Alcantara (Indonesia) Christopher Rungkat
- Score: 6–1, 6–3

Events
Singles	Doubles
← 2022 ·	Nonthaburi Challenger	· 2022 →

Evgeny Donskoy and Alibek Kachmazov were the defending champions but lost in the first round to Toshihide Matsui and Kaito Uesugi.

Benjamin Lock and Yuta Shimizu won the title after defeating Francis Alcantara and Christopher Rungkat 6–1, 6–3 in the final.

== Seeds ==
1. (Australia) Tristan Schoolkate / (Australia) Dane Sweeny (first round)
2. (Chinese Taipei) Ray Ho / (Kazakhstan) Grigoriy Lomakin (first round)
3. (Zimbabwe) Benjamin Lock / (Japan) Yuta Shimizu (champions)
4. (United Kingdom) Charles Broom / (Israel) Daniel Cukierman (first round)

== Draw ==
=== Key ===
- Q = Qualifier
- WC = Wild card
- LL = Lucky loser
- Alt = Alternate
- SE = Special exempt
- PR = Protected ranking
- ITF = ITF entry
- JE = Junior exempt
- w/o = Walkover
- r = Retired
- d = Defaulted
- SR = Special ranking

First round
1	(Australia) T Schoolkate (Australia) D Sweeny	3	6	[8]
(Japan) S Shimabukuro (Japan) S Watanabe	6	3	[10]
(South Korea) Y-s Chung (Kazakhstan) B Zhukayev	6	7
WC	(Thailand) Natthasith Kunsuwan (Thailand) Pol Wattanakul	2	5
3	(Zimbabwe) B Lock (Japan) Y Shimizu	7^{7}	6
WC	(Thailand) P Isaro (Thailand) T Suksumrarn	6^{1}	2
E Donskoy; A Kachmazov	6^{4}	6^{6}
(Japan) T Matsui (Japan) K Uesugi	7^{7}	7^{8}
(United Kingdom) B Harris (Zimbabwe) CJ Lock	3	5
Alt	(Australia) O Jasika (Australia) J McCabe	6	7
(India) A Chandrasekar (India) V Vardhan	3	6	[10]
4	(United Kingdom) C Broom (Israel) D Cukierman	6	2	[8]
(Uzbekistan) S Fomin (Uzbekistan) D Istomin	6	1	[10]
(Australia) A Santillan (China) Y Bu	4	6	[6]
(Philippines) FC Alcantara (Indonesia) C Rungkat	7	4	[10]
2	(Chinese Taipei) R Ho (Kazakhstan) G Lomakin	5	6	[5]

Quarterfinals
(Japan) S Shimabukuro (Japan) S Watanabe	3	4
(South Korea) Y-s Chung (Kazakhstan) B Zhukayev	6	6
3	(Zimbabwe) B Lock (Japan) Y Shimizu	3	6	[10]
(Japan) T Matsui (Japan) K Uesugi	6	1	[2]
Alt	(Australia) O Jasika (Australia) J McCabe
(India) A Chandrasekar (India) V Vardhan	w/o
(Uzbekistan) S Fomin (Uzbekistan) D Istomin	6^{8}	2
(Philippines) FC Alcantara (Indonesia) C Rungkat	7^{10}	6

Semifinals
(South Korea) Y-s Chung (Kazakhstan) B Zhukayev	6^{4}	3
3	(Zimbabwe) B Lock (Japan) Y Shimizu	7^{7}	6
(India) A Chandrasekar (India) V Vardhan	6	4	[9]
(Philippines) FC Alcantara (Indonesia) C Rungkat	2	6	[11]

Final
3	(Zimbabwe) B Lock (Japan) Y Shimizu	6	6
(Philippines) FC Alcantara (Indonesia) C Rungkat	1	3
