= 2022 Nonthaburi Challenger III =

- Date: 5 – 11 September
- Edition: 3rd
- Surface: Hard
- Location: Nonthaburi, Thailand

Champions

Singles
- (United Kingdom) Stuart Parker

Doubles
- (South Korea) Chung Yun-seong / (New Zealand) Ajeet Rai
| ← 2022 · | Nonthaburi Challenger | · 2023 → |

The 2022 Nonthaburi Challenger III was a professional tennis tournament played on hard courts. It was the 3rd edition of the tournament which was part of the 2022 ATP Challenger Tour. It took place in Nonthaburi, Thailand from 5 to 11 September 2022.

== Singles main-draw entrants ==
=== Seeds ===
| Country | Player | Rank^{1} | Seed |
|---|---|---|---|
| JPN | Yosuke Watanuki | 242 | 1 |
| MON | Valentin Vacherot | 271 | 2 |
| VIE | Lý Hoàng Nam | 290 | 3 |
| GBR | Billy Harris | 305 | 4 |
| GER | Nicola Kuhn | 317 | 5 |
| | Alibek Kachmazov | 319 | 6 |
| AUS | Dane Sweeny | 326 | 7 |
| IND | Prajnesh Gunneswaran | 329 | 8 |

- ^{1} Rankings are as of 29 August 2022.

=== Other entrants ===
The following players received wildcards into the singles main draw:

- (Thailand) Yuttana Charoenphon
- (Thailand) Pruchya Isaro
- (Thailand) Pol Wattanakul

The following player received entry into the singles main draw as an alternate:

- (Australia) James McCabe

The following players received entry from the qualifying draw:

- (United States) Gage Brymer
- (Japan) Makoto Ochi
- (United Kingdom) Stuart Parker
- (New Zealand) Ajeet Rai
- (Thailand) Kasidit Samrej
- (Japan) Yuta Shimizu

== Champions ==
=== Singles ===
- (United Kingdom) Stuart Parker def. (France) Arthur Cazaux 6–4, 4–1 ret.

=== Doubles ===
- (South Korea) Chung Yun-seong / (New Zealand) Ajeet Rai def. (Philippines) Francis Alcantara / (Indonesia) Christopher Rungkat 6–1, 7–6^{(8–6)}.
