= 2025 Nonthaburi Challenger II =

- Date: 6 – 11 January
- Edition: 12th
- Surface: Hard
- Location: Nonthaburi, Thailand

Champions

Singles
- (Japan) Rio Noguchi

Doubles
- (Chinese Taipei) Ray Ho / (Austria) Neil Oberleitner
← 2025 ·	Nonthaburi Challenger	· 2025 →

The 2025 Nonthaburi Challenger II was a professional tennis tournament played on hard courts. It was the 12th edition of the tournament which was part of the 2025 ATP Challenger Tour. It took place in Nonthaburi, Thailand from 6 to 11 January 2025.

== Singles main-draw entrants ==
=== Seeds ===
Country	Player	Rank^{1}	Seed
TPE	Hsu Yu-hsiou	239	1
ITA	Francesco Maestrelli	242	2
~~VEN~~	~~Gonzalo Oliveira~~	~~245~~	~~3~~
CHN	Bai Yan	255	4
CZE	Marek Gengel	257	5
CHN	Sun Fajing	277	6
FRA	Geoffrey Blancaneaux	279	7
SUI	Rémy Bertola	282	8

- ^{1} Rankings are as of 30 December 2024.

=== Other entrants ===
The following players received wildcards into the singles main draw:

- (Thailand) Thanapet Chanta
- (Thailand) Maximus Jones
- (Thailand) Wishaya Trongcharoenchaikul

The following player received entry into the singles main draw as an alternate:

- (Poland) Daniel Michalski

The following players received entry from the qualifying draw:

- (Japan) Kokoro Isomura
- (Czech Republic) Zdeněk Kolář
- (France) Benoît Paire
- (Switzerland) Jakub Paul
- (Japan) Hikaru Shiraishi
- (Japan) Yusuke Takahashi

The following player received entry as a lucky loser:

- (Austria) Neil Oberleitner

== Champions ==
=== Singles ===
- (Japan) Rio Noguchi def. (China) Cui Jie 7–6^{(11–9)}, 6–2.

=== Doubles ===
- (Chinese Taipei) Ray Ho / (Austria) Neil Oberleitner def. (Israel) Daniel Cukierman / (United Kingdom) Joshua Paris 6–4, 7–6^{(7–5)}.
