= 2024 Nonthaburi Challenger IV – Doubles =

Doubles
- 2024 Nonthaburi Challenger IV

Final
- Champions: (Australia) Blake Ellis (Australia) Adam Walton
- Runners-up: (India) Rithvik Choudary Bollipalli (India) Arjun Kadhe
- Score: 3–6, 7–5, [10–8]

Events
Singles	Doubles
← 2024 ·	Nonthaburi Challenger	· 2025 →

Luke Johnson and Skander Mansouri were the defending champions but chose not to defend their title.

Blake Ellis and Adam Walton won the title after defeating Rithvik Choudary Bollipalli and Arjun Kadhe 3–6, 7–5, [10–8] in the final.

== Seeds ==
1. (India) Rithvik Choudary Bollipalli / (India) Arjun Kadhe (final)
2. (Colombia) Cristian Rodríguez / (Australia) Matthew Romios (quarterfinals)
3. (India) Jeevan Nedunchezhiyan / (India) Vijay Sundar Prashanth (withdrew)
4. (Japan) Toshihide Matsui / (India) Ramkumar Ramanathan (semifinals)

== Draw ==
=== Key ===
- Q = Qualifier
- WC = Wild card
- LL = Lucky loser
- Alt = Alternate
- SE = Special exempt
- PR = Protected ranking
- ITF = ITF entry
- JE = Junior exempt
- w/o = Walkover
- r = Retired
- d = Defaulted
- SR = Special ranking

=== Draw ===
First round
1	(India) RC Bollipalli (India) A Kadhe	6	6
WC	(Thailand) Credit Chaiyarin (Thailand) Noppadol Noikor	2	0
(Canada) G Diallo (Japan) S Watanabe	6	6
(Netherlands) D Pel (Netherlands) B Stevens	4	4
4	(Japan) T Matsui (India) R Ramanathan	7	5	[10]
(Japan) R Noguchi (Japan) K Uchida	5	7	[7]
(Spain) A Moro Cañas (Argentina) M Trungelliti	3	6	[10]
(Philippines) FC Alcantara (South Korea) Y-s Chung	6	4	[8]
(Thailand) P Isaro (South Korea) J-s Nam	6	6^{1}	[6]
(Chinese Taipei) R Ho (United Kingdom) J Paris	4	7^{7}	[10]
(Australia) B Bayldon (Australia) T Fancutt	4	7^{7}	[10]
Alt	(Greece) M Kalovelonis (Uzbekistan) K Sultanov	6	6^{3}	[6]
WC	(Thailand) Yuttana Charoenphon (Thailand) K Samrej	6^{4}	3
(Australia) B Ellis (Australia) A Walton	7^{7}	6
(Kazakhstan) D Yevseyev (Kazakhstan) B Zhukayev	1	3
2	(Colombia) C Rodríguez (Australia) MC Romios	6	6

Quarterfinals
1	(India) RC Bollipalli (India) A Kadhe	7^{7}	7^{7}
(Canada) G Diallo (Japan) S Watanabe	6^{3}	6^{5}
4	(Japan) T Matsui (India) R Ramanathan	6	6
(Spain) A Moro Cañas (Argentina) M Trungelliti	3	4
(Chinese Taipei) R Ho (United Kingdom) J Paris	4	6	[7]
(Australia) B Bayldon (Australia) T Fancutt	6	2	[10]
(Australia) B Ellis (Australia) A Walton	6	6
2	(Colombia) C Rodríguez (Australia) MC Romios	3	4

Semifinals
1	(India) RC Bollipalli (India) A Kadhe	6	6
4	(Japan) T Matsui (India) R Ramanathan	3	4
(Australia) B Bayldon (Australia) T Fancutt	3	5
(Australia) B Ellis (Australia) A Walton	6	7

Final
1	(India) RC Bollipalli (India) A Kadhe	6	5	[8]
(Australia) B Ellis (Australia) A Walton	3	7	[10]
