= 2025 Nonthaburi Challenger II – Singles =

Singles
- 2025 Nonthaburi Challenger II

Final
- Champion: (Japan) Rio Noguchi
- Runner-up: (China) Cui Jie
- Score: 7–6^{(11–9)}, 6–2

Events
Singles	Doubles
← 2025 ·	Nonthaburi Challenger	· 2025 →

Aslan Karatsev was the defending champion but lost in the second round to Marat Sharipov.

Rio Noguchi won the title after defeating Cui Jie 7–6^{(11–9)}, 6–2 in the final.

== Seeds ==
1. (Chinese Taipei) Hsu Yu-hsiou (second round)
2. (Italy) Francesco Maestrelli (second round)
3. (Venezuela) Gonzalo Oliveira (withdrew)
4. (China) Bai Yan (first round)
5. (Czech Republic) Marek Gengel (first round, retired)
6. (China) Sun Fajing (first round)
7. (France) Geoffrey Blancaneaux (first round)
8. (Switzerland) Rémy Bertola (first round)

== Draw ==
=== Key ===
- Q = Qualifier
- WC = Wild card
- LL = Lucky loser
- Alt = Alternate
- ITF = ITF entry
- PR = Protected ranking
- SR = Special ranking
- SE = Special exempt
- JE = Junior exempt
- JR = Junior Accelerator Programme entrant
- CO = College Accelerator Programme entrant
- NG = Next Gen Accelerator Program entrant
- w/o = Walkover
- r = Retired
- d = Defaulted

=== Finals ===
Semifinals
(Japan) Rio Noguchi	7	6^{4}	6
(United States) Murphy Cassone	5	7^{7}	3
Marat Sharipov	6	3	6^{6}
(China) Cui Jie	3	6	7^{8}

Final
(Japan) Rio Noguchi	7^{11}	6
(China) Cui Jie	6^{9}	2

=== Top half ===
First round
1	(Chinese Taipei) Y-h Hsu	6	6
Q	(Japan) K Isomura	2	1
WC	(Thailand) M Jones	6^{3}	6	6
Q	(France) B Paire	7^{7}	3	4
WC	(Thailand) Thanapet Chanta	5	3
(Japan) R Noguchi	7	6
(France) C Denolly	7^{9}	4	6
6	(China) F Sun	6^{7}	6	4
LL	(Austria) N Oberleitner	4	6^{5}
Q	(Switzerland) J Paul	6	7^{7}
(Italy) E Dalla Valle	6	6
Q	(Japan) Hikaru Shiraishi	0	2
(Ukraine) O Prihodko	6	3	4
(United States) Andre Ilagan	3	6	6
(United States) M Cassone	6	6
8	(Switzerland) R Bertola	4	1

Second round
1	(Chinese Taipei) Y-h Hsu	2	1
WC	(Thailand) M Jones	6	6
(Japan) R Noguchi	6	6
(France) C Denolly	3	3
Q	(Switzerland) J Paul	6	6
(Italy) E Dalla Valle	3	4
(United States) A Ilagan	2	3
(United States) M Cassone	6	6

Quarterfinals
WC	(Thailand) M Jones	6	1	0
(Japan) R Noguchi	3	6	6
Q	(Switzerland) J Paul	6^{3}	6^{3}
(United States) M Cassone	7^{7}	7^{7}

Semifinals
(Japan) R Noguchi	7	6^{4}	6
(United States) M Cassone	5	7^{7}	3

=== Bottom half ===
First round
5	(Czech Republic) M Gengel	1^{r}
(Japan) H Moriya	5
Q	(Japan) Y Takahashi	2	7^{8}	3
(Japan) M Imamura	6	6^{6}	1^{r}
M Sharipov	6	6
Q	(Czech Republic) Z Kolář	3	4
A Karatsev	7	2	7^{7}
4	(China) Y Bai	5	6	6^{2}
7	(France) G Blancaneaux	0	4
Alt	(Poland) D Michalski	6	6
(Netherlands) J Sels	7^{7}	6
(France) C Tabur	6^{4}	3
WC	(Thailand) W Trongcharoenchaikul	4	2
(China) J Cui	6	6
(United States) Christian Langmo	6	1	3
2	(Italy) F Maestrelli	4	6	6

Second round
(Japan) H Moriya	4	4
Q	(Japan) Y Takahashi	6	6
M Sharipov	7^{7}	5	6
A Karatsev	6^{2}	7	4
Alt	(Poland) D Michalski	1	6	7^{7}
(Netherlands) J Sels	6	1	6^{1}
(China) J Cui	6	6
2	(Italy) F Maestrelli	4	2

Quarterfinals
Q	(Japan) Y Takahashi	3	6	2
M Sharipov	6	4	6
Alt	(Poland) D Michalski	6	3	6^{4}
(China) J Cui	2	6	7^{7}

Semifinals
M Sharipov	6	3	6^{6}
(China) J Cui	3	6	7^{8}
