= 2024 Nonthaburi Challenger IV – Singles =

Singles
- 2024 Nonthaburi Challenger IV

Final
- Champion: (Chinese Taipei) Wu Tung-lin
- Runner-up: (United States) Mackenzie McDonald
- Score: 6–3, 7–6^{(7–4)}

Events
Singles	Doubles
← 2024 ·	Nonthaburi Challenger	· 2025 →

Matteo Gigante was the defending champion but chose not to defend his title.

Wu Tung-lin won the title after defeating Mackenzie McDonald 6–3, 7–6^{(7–4)} in the final.

== Seeds ==
1. (France) Arthur Cazaux (quarterfinals)
2. (Australia) Adam Walton (quarterfinals)
3. (Canada) Gabriel Diallo (quarterfinals)
4. (Germany) Maximilian Marterer (first round)
5. Aslan Karatsev (second round)
6. (Argentina) Marco Trungelliti (first round)
7. (United States) Mitchell Krueger (second round)
8. (Hong Kong) Coleman Wong (semifinals)

== Draw ==
=== Key ===
- Q = Qualifier
- WC = Wild card
- LL = Lucky loser
- Alt = Alternate
- SE = Special exempt
- PR = Protected ranking
- ITF = ITF entry
- JE = Junior exempt
- w/o = Walkover
- r = Retired
- d = Defaulted
- SR = Special ranking

=== Finals ===
Semifinals
(Australia) James McCabe	1	6	6^{2}
Q	(Chinese Taipei) Wu Tung-lin	6	3	7^{7}
(United States) Mackenzie McDonald	6	6
8	(Hong Kong) Coleman Wong	3	4

Final
Q	(Chinese Taipei) Wu Tung-lin	6	7^{7}
(United States) Mackenzie McDonald	3	6^{4}

=== Top half ===
First round
1	(France) A Cazaux	6	6
(Ukraine) Vadym Ursu	1	2
WC	(Thailand) W Trongcharoenchaikul	5	2
Q	I Simakin	7	6
(Spain) A Moro Cañas	4	6^{2}
(Australia) J McCabe	6	7^{7}
(Ukraine) I Marchenko	1	4
5	A Karatsev	6	6
4	(Germany) M Marterer	6^{3}	5
(Japan) R Noguchi	7^{7}	7
(Czech Republic) D Svrčina	6	6
Q	(Malaysia) Mitsuki Wei Kang Leong	1	1
(Kazakhstan) D Yevseyev	6	6
E Gerasimov	1	2
Q	(Chinese Taipei) T-l Wu	6	6
6	(Argentina) M Trungelliti	1	3

Second round
1	(France) A Cazaux	6	6
Q	I Simakin	2	4
(Australia) J McCabe	6	6
5	A Karatsev	1	4
(Japan) R Noguchi	4	5
(Czech Republic) D Svrčina	6	7
(Kazakhstan) D Yevseyev	4	1^{r}
Q	(Chinese Taipei) T-l Wu	6	4

Quarterfinals
1	(France) A Cazaux	6^{4}	6	3
(Australia) J McCabe	7^{7}	4	6
(Czech Republic) D Svrčina	1	1
Q	(Chinese Taipei) T-l Wu	6	6

Semifinals
(Australia) J McCabe	1	6	6^{2}
Q	(Chinese Taipei) T-l Wu	6	3	7^{7}

=== Bottom half ===
First round
7	(United States) M Krueger	6	6
Q	(Ukraine) Yurii Dzhavakian	2	1
(United States) M McDonald	6	6
WC	(Thailand) Thanapet Chanta	3	1
(Kazakhstan) B Zhukayev	6^{5}	4
(Venezuela) G Oliveira	7^{7}	6
Q	(South Korea) J-s Nam	6^{9}	0
3	(Canada) G Diallo	7^{11}	6
8	(Hong Kong) C Wong	6	6
WC	(Thailand) K Samrej	4	3
(Uzbekistan) K Sultanov	6	2	2
(United Kingdom) D Evans	4	6	6
(Australia) A Bolt	7^{9}	7
Q	(Japan) Y Shimizu	6^{7}	5
(Chinese Taipei) Y-h Hsu	3	3
2	(Australia) A Walton	6	6

Second round
7	(United States) M Krueger	3	2
(United States) M McDonald	6	6
(Venezuela) G Oliveira	3	0^{r}
3	(Canada) G Diallo	6	2
8	(Hong Kong) C Wong	6	7
(United Kingdom) D Evans	4	5
(Australia) A Bolt	6^{4}	3
2	(Australia) A Walton	7^{7}	6

Quarterfinals
(United States) M McDonald	7^{8}	6
3	(Canada) G Diallo	6^{6}	3
8	(Hong Kong) C Wong	6	6
2	(Australia) A Walton	4	4

Semifinals
(United States) M McDonald	6	6
8	(Hong Kong) C Wong	3	4
