= 2022 Nonthaburi Challenger – Singles =

Singles
- 2022 Nonthaburi Challenger

Final
- Champion: (Monaco) Valentin Vacherot
- Runner-up: (Vietnam) Lý Hoàng Nam
- Score: 6–3, 7–6^{(7–4)}

Events
Singles	Doubles
- Nonthaburi Challenger

This was the first edition of the tournament.

Valentin Vacherot won the title after defeating Lý Hoàng Nam 6–3, 7–6^{(7–4)} in the final.

== Seeds ==
1. (United Kingdom) Alastair Gray (quarterfinals)
2. (Japan) Yasutaka Uchiyama (semifinals)
3. (Kazakhstan) Denis Yevseyev (second round, retired)
4. (United Kingdom) Billy Harris (first round)
5. (Brazil) Gabriel Décamps (second round)
6. (Israel) Yshai Oliel (first round)
7. (Germany) Nicola Kuhn (second round)
8. (Ukraine) Illya Marchenko (second round)

== Draw ==
Key

- Q = Qualifier
- WC = Wild card
- LL = Lucky loser
- Alt = Alternate
- ITF = ITF entry
- PR = Protected ranking
- SR = Special ranking
- SE = Special exempt
- JE = Junior exempt
- JR = Junior Accelerator Programme entrant
- CO = College Accelerator Programme entrant
- NG = Next Gen Accelerator Program entrant
- w/o = Walkover
- r = Retired
- d = Defaulted

=== Finals ===
Semifinals
(Vietnam) Lý Hoàng Nam	6	6^{2}	6
(Australia) Dane Sweeny	4	7^{7}	3
Q	(Monaco) Valentin Vacherot	6	5	7^{8}
2	(Japan) Yasutaka Uchiyama	3	7	6^{6}

Final
(Vietnam) Lý Hoàng Nam	3	6^{4}
Q	(Monaco) Valentin Vacherot	6	7^{7}

=== Top half ===
First round
1	(United Kingdom) A Gray	7^{8}	6
(France) A Cazaux	6^{6}	4
E Donskoy	6	6
(India) P Gunneswaran	3	3
(Vietnam) NH Lý	6	7^{7}
Q	(Australia) D Kelly	4	6^{4}
(Chinese Taipei) J Jung	6^{1}	2
8	(Ukraine) I Marchenko	7^{7}	6
4	(United Kingdom) B Harris	6^{10}	6	3
A Kachmazov	7^{12}	3	6
(Australia) A Santillan	7^{7}	5	6
WC	(Thailand) W Trongcharoenchaikul	6^{2}	7	0
(Australia) D Sweeny	6	6
WC	(Thailand) Y Charoenphon	1	0
(Uzbekistan) S Fomin	2	3^{r}
5	(Brazil) G Décamps	6	4

Second round
1	(United Kingdom) A Gray	6	4	6
E Donskoy	3	6	3
(Vietnam) NH Lý	4	6	7
8	(Ukraine) I Marchenko	6	1	5
A Kachmazov	6	6
(Australia) A Santillan	2	4
(Australia) D Sweeny	6	6
5	(Brazil) G Décamps	3	4

Quarterfinals
1	(United Kingdom) A Gray	4	5
(Vietnam) NH Lý	6	7
A Kachmazov	6	1	2
(Australia) D Sweeny	4	6	6

Semifinals
(Vietnam) NH Lý	6	6^{2}	6
(Australia) D Sweeny	4	7^{7}	3

=== Bottom half ===
First round
7	(Germany) N Kuhn	7	6
(Zimbabwe) B Lock	5	3
Q	(Monaco) V Vacherot	6	6
Q	(United States) Gage Brymer	1	4
WC	(Thailand) K Samrej	2	6	4
Q	(France) K Jacquet	6	4	6
(Chinese Taipei) Y-h Hsu	1^{r}
3	(Kazakhstan) D Yevseyev	2
6	(Israel) Y Oliel	2	6	1
(Italy) F Gaio	6	3	6
(Kazakhstan) B Zhukayev	6	3	3
(Australia) O Jasika	4	6	6
(China) Y Bu	6	1	0^{r}
Q	(South Korea) S-c Hong	4	6	3
Q	(Japan) Y Shimizu	2	3
2	(Japan) Y Uchiyama	6	6

Second round
7	(Germany) N Kuhn	5	3
Q	(Monaco) V Vacherot	7	6
Q	(France) K Jacquet	6^{2}	7^{7}	3
3	(Kazakhstan) D Yevseyev	7^{7}	6^{4}	0^{r}
(Italy) F Gaio	0	5
(Australia) O Jasika	6	7
Q	(South Korea) S-c Hong	3	3
2	(Japan) Y Uchiyama	6	6

Quarterfinals
Q	(Monaco) V Vacherot	6	6
Q	(France) K Jacquet	3	2
(Australia) O Jasika	2	4
2	(Japan) Y Uchiyama	6	6

Semifinals
Q	(Monaco) V Vacherot	6	5	7^{8}
2	(Japan) Y Uchiyama	3	7	6^{6}
