= 2025 Nonthaburi Challenger III – Singles =

Singles
- 2025 Nonthaburi Challenger III

Final
- Champion: (United States) Brandon Holt
- Runner-up: (Czech Republic) Vít Kopřiva
- Score: 6–3, 6–2

Events
Singles	Doubles
← 2025 ·	Nonthaburi Challenger	· 2026 →

Rio Noguchi was the defending champion but lost in the second round to Murphy Cassone.

Brandon Holt won the title after defeating Vít Kopřiva 6–3, 6–2 in the final.

== Seeds ==
1. (Czech Republic) Vít Kopřiva (final)
2. (France) Hugo Grenier (quarterfinals)
3. (Monaco) Valentin Vacherot (first round)
4. (United States) Zachary Svajda (quarterfinals)
5. (Japan) Shintaro Mochizuki (second round)
6. (Hong Kong) Coleman Wong (second round)
7. (Germany) Henri Squire (second round)
8. (Kazakhstan) Dmitry Popko (first round)

== Draw ==
=== Key ===
- Q = Qualifier
- WC = Wild card
- LL = Lucky loser
- Alt = Alternate
- ITF = ITF entry
- PR = Protected ranking
- SR = Special ranking
- SE = Special exempt
- JE = Junior exempt
- JR = Junior Accelerator Programme entrant
- CO = College Accelerator Programme entrant
- NG = Next Gen Accelerator Program entrant
- w/o = Walkover
- r = Retired
- d = Defaulted

=== Finals ===
Semifinals
1	(Czech Republic) Vít Kopřiva	6	6
Q	(United States) Murphy Cassone	2	2
(United States) Brandon Holt	6	6
Q	(France) Clément Tabur	2	4

Final
1	(Czech Republic) Vít Kopřiva	3	2
(United States) Brandon Holt	6	6

=== Top half ===
First round
1	(Czech Republic) V Kopřiva	6	6
(Dominican Republic) N Hardt	4	1
(Romania) FC Jianu	2	2
Alt	(Chinese Taipei) T-l Wu	6	6
(France) E Couacaud	3	2
(Czech Republic) D Svrčina	6	6
WC	(Thailand) M Jones	6^{0}	0^{r}
7	(Germany) H Squire	7^{7}	0
3	(Monaco) V Vacherot	1	6	6^{2}
Q	(United States) M Cassone	6	4	7^{7}
(Kazakhstan) T Skatov	1	3
Q	(Japan) R Noguchi	6	6
(Japan) S Shimabukuro	2	6	6
(France) A Escoffier	6	2	1
Alt	(Italy) F Arnaboldi	6	2	6
8	(Kazakhstan) D Popko	1	6	1

Second round
1	(Czech Republic) V Kopřiva	6	7^{7}
Alt	(Chinese Taipei) T-l Wu	4	6^{4}
(Czech Republic) D Svrčina	6	6^{4}	6
7	(Germany) H Squire	4	7^{7}	1
Q	(United States) M Cassone	6	6
Q	(Japan) R Noguchi	3	4
(Japan) S Shimabukuro	6	6^{4}	4
Alt	(Italy) F Arnaboldi	1	7^{7}	6

Quarterfinals
1	(Czech Republic) V Kopřiva	6	6
(Czech Republic) D Svrčina	0	1
Q	(United States) M Cassone	6	6
Alt	(Italy) F Arnaboldi	4	1

Semifinals
1	(Czech Republic) V Kopřiva	6	6
Q	(United States) M Cassone	2	2

=== Bottom half ===
First round
6	(Hong Kong) C Wong	7^{7}	7^{7}
(Lebanon) B Hassan	6^{2}	6^{4}
(United States) B Holt	6	6
WC	(Thailand) W Trongcharoenchaikul	3	3
(Uzbekistan) K Sultanov	4	6	3
(Japan) Y Shimizu	6	3	6
Q	(China) F Sun	3	2
4	(United States) Z Svajda	6	6
5/Alt	(Japan) S Mochizuki	7^{7}	7
Q	(Switzerland) R Bertola	6^{0}	5
Q	(France) C Tabur	6	6
Q	(Italy) F Maestrelli	2	1
(Austria) L Neumayer	6	4	2
(United States) E Spizzirri	3	6	6
WC	(Thailand) Thanapet Chanta	2	0
2	(France) H Grenier	6	6

Second round
6	(Hong Kong) C Wong	4	1
(United States) B Holt	6	6
(Japan) Y Shimizu	6	3	2
4	(United States) Z Svajda	4	6	6
5/Alt	(Japan) S Mochizuki	2	4
Q	(France) C Tabur	6	6
(United States) E Spizzirri	4	4
2	(France) H Grenier	6	6

Quarterfinals
(United States) B Holt	6^{7}	6	6
4	(United States) Z Svajda	7^{9}	3	4
Q	(France) C Tabur	7	6
2	(France) H Grenier	5	4

Semifinals
(United States) B Holt	6	6
Q	(France) C Tabur	2	4
