= 2026 Nonthaburi Challenger – Doubles =

Doubles
- 2026 Nonthaburi Challenger

Final
- Champions: (Israel) Daniel Cukierman (Austria) Joel Schwärzler
- Runners-up: (Chinese Taipei) Hsieh Cheng-peng (Chinese Taipei) Huang Tsung-hao
- Score: 6–3, 6–1

Events
Singles	Doubles
- Nonthaburi Challenger

Ray Ho and Neil Oberleitner were the defending champions but chose not to defend their title.

Daniel Cukierman and Joel Schwärzler won the title after defeating Hsieh Cheng-peng and Huang Tsung-hao 6–3, 6–1 in the final.

== Seeds ==
1. (Israel) Daniel Cukierman / (Austria) Joel Schwärzler (champions)
2. (Netherlands) Thijmen Loof / (South Korea) Nam Ji-sung (first round)
3. (Australia) Joshua Charlton / (United States) Keshav Chopra (semifinals)
4. (Japan) Yuta Shimizu / (Japan) Naoki Tajima (semifinals)

== Draw ==
Key

- Q = Qualifier
- WC = Wild card
- LL = Lucky loser
- Alt = Alternate
- ITF = ITF entry
- PR = Protected ranking
- SR = Special ranking
- SE = Special exempt
- JE = Junior exempt
- JR = Junior Accelerator Programme entrant
- CO = College Accelerator Programme entrant
- NG = Next Gen Accelerator Program entrant
- w/o = Walkover
- r = Retired
- d = Defaulted

First round
1	(Israel) D Cukierman (Austria) J Schwärzler	6	6
(Japan) T Ichikawa (Japan) K Isomura	1	4
WC	(Thailand) K Samrej (Thailand) Pawit Sornlaksup	3	6	[8]
(France) F Bax (France) R Bertrand	6	3	[10]
4	(Japan) Y Shimizu (Japan) N Tajima	7^{7}	2	[10]
(Thailand) M Jones (Canada) K Stevenson	6^{3}	6	[6]
(South Korea) H Chung (South Korea) Shin San-hui	2	3
WC	(Thailand) Siwanat Auytayakul (Thailand) Thanapet Chanta	6	6
(Philippines) FC Alcantara (Zimbabwe) CJ Lock	6	6^{4}	[10]
(France) C Denolly; M Sharipov	4	7^{7}	[7]
(Japan) H Matsuoka (Chinese Taipei) T-l Wu	3	3
3	(Australia) J Charlton (United States) K Chopra	6	6
(Chinese Taipei) C-p Hsieh (Chinese Taipei) T-h Huang	7	7^{7}
(Chinese Taipei) J Jung (Japan) K Uesugi	5	6^{3}
(Japan) R Noguchi (Japan) A Santillan	7	7
2	(Netherlands) T Loof (South Korea) J-s Nam	5	5

Quarterfinals
1	(Israel) D Cukierman (Austria) J Schwärzler	6	6
(France) F Bax (France) R Bertrand	3	4
4	(Japan) Y Shimizu (Japan) N Tajima	2	7^{7}	[10]
WC	(Thailand) S Auytayakul (Thailand) T Chanta	6	6^{5}	[7]
(Philippines) FC Alcantara (Zimbabwe) CJ Lock	6^{5}	6^{2}
3	(Australia) J Charlton (United States) K Chopra	7^{7}	7^{7}
(Chinese Taipei) C-p Hsieh (Chinese Taipei) T-h Huang	6	4	[10]
(Japan) R Noguchi (Japan) A Santillan	2	6	[4]

Semifinals
1	(Israel) D Cukierman (Austria) J Schwärzler	2	6	[10]
4	(Japan) Y Shimizu (Japan) N Tajima	6	3	[4]
3	(Australia) J Charlton (United States) K Chopra	4	2
(Chinese Taipei) C-p Hsieh (Chinese Taipei) T-h Huang	6	6

Final
1	(Israel) D Cukierman (Austria) J Schwärzler	6	6
(Chinese Taipei) C-p Hsieh (Chinese Taipei) T-h Huang	3	1
