= 2023 Nonthaburi Challenger II =

- Date: 9 – 14 January
- Edition: 5th
- Surface: Hard
- Location: Nonthaburi, Thailand

Champions

Singles
- (France) Arthur Cazaux

Doubles
- (India) Yuki Bhambri / (India) Saketh Myneni
| ← 2023 · | Nonthaburi Challenger | · 2023 → |

The 2023 Nonthaburi Challenger II was a professional tennis tournament played on hard courts. It was the 5th edition of the tournament which was part of the 2023 ATP Challenger Tour. It took place in Nonthaburi, Thailand from 9 to 14 January 2023.

== Singles main-draw entrants ==
=== Seeds ===
| Country | Player | Rank^{1} | Seed |
|---|---|---|---|
| AUT | Dennis Novak | 180 | 1 |
| RSA | Lloyd Harris | 237 | 2 |
| POL | Kacper Żuk | 245 | 3 |
| CZE | Zdeněk Kolář | 247 | 4 |
| BEL | Michael Geerts | 254 | 5 |
| POL | Daniel Michalski | 260 | 6 |
| JPN | Sho Shimabukuro | 264 | 7 |
| USA | Tennys Sandgren | 265 | 8 |

- ^{1} Rankings are as of 2 January 2023.

=== Other entrants ===
The following players received wildcards into the singles main draw:

- (Thailand) Palaphoom Kovapitukted
- (Thailand) Kasidit Samrej
- (Thailand) Wishaya Trongcharoenchaikul

The following players received entry into the singles main draw as alternates:

- (India) Prajnesh Gunneswaran
- (United Kingdom) Billy Harris

The following players received entry from the qualifying draw:

- (United States) Alafia Ayeni
- (France) Arthur Cazaux
- Evgeny Donskoy
- (Italy) Giovanni Fonio
- (Chinese Taipei) Jason Jung
- (Germany) Henri Squire

== Champions ==
=== Singles ===
- (France) Arthur Cazaux def. (South Africa) Lloyd Harris 7–6^{(7–5)}, 6–2.

=== Doubles ===
- (India) Yuki Bhambri / (India) Saketh Myneni def. (Indonesia) Christopher Rungkat / (Australia) Akira Santillan 2–6, 7–6^{(9–7)}, [14–12].
