= 2022 Nonthaburi Challenger III – Singles =

Singles
- 2022 Nonthaburi Challenger III

Final
- Champion: (United Kingdom) Stuart Parker
- Runner-up: (France) Arthur Cazaux
- Score: 6–4, 4–1 ret.

Events
Singles	Doubles
- Nonthaburi Challenger

Arthur Cazaux was the defending champion but retired from his match with Stuart Parker in the final; 6–4, 4–1.

== Seeds ==
1. (Japan) Yosuke Watanuki (quarterfinals)
2. (Monaco) Valentin Vacherot (first round)
3. (Vietnam) Lý Hoàng Nam (quarterfinals)
4. (United Kingdom) Billy Harris (quarterfinals)
5. (Germany) Nicola Kuhn (first round)
6. Alibek Kachmazov (first round)
7. (Australia) Dane Sweeny (first round)
8. (India) Prajnesh Gunneswaran (second round)

== Draw ==
Key

- Q = Qualifier
- WC = Wild card
- LL = Lucky loser
- Alt = Alternate
- ITF = ITF entry
- PR = Protected ranking
- SR = Special ranking
- SE = Special exempt
- JE = Junior exempt
- JR = Junior Accelerator Programme entrant
- CO = College Accelerator Programme entrant
- NG = Next Gen Accelerator Program entrant
- w/o = Walkover
- r = Retired
- d = Defaulted

=== Finals ===
Semifinals
(Japan) Sho Shimabukuro	6^{5}	4
Q	(United Kingdom) Stuart Parker	7^{7}	6
(France) Arthur Cazaux	6	3
(Australia) Omar Jasika	0	0^{r}

Final
Q	(United Kingdom) Stuart Parker	6	4
(France) Arthur Cazaux	4	1^{r}

=== Top half ===
First round
1	(Japan) Yo Watanuki	7	6^{2}	5
(South Korea) Y-s Chung	5	7^{7}	3^{r}
(Kazakhstan) B Zhukayev	7^{7}	7^{7}
E Donskoy	6^{4}	6^{4}
(Japan) S Shimabukuro	6	6
(United Kingdom) C Broom	3	2
Q	(Japan) Y Shimizu	6	6
5	(Germany) N Kuhn	1	2
4	(United Kingdom) B Harris	6	7^{7}
(Zimbabwe) B Lock	3	6^{4}
Q	(United States) Gage Brymer	2	6	6
Alt	(Australia) J McCabe	6	3	4
(China) Y Bu	4	5
Q	(United Kingdom) S Parker	6	7
(Israel) Y Oliel	6	3	6
6	A Kachmazov	4	6	2

Second round
1	(Japan) Yo Watanuki	6	6
(Kazakhstan) B Zhukayev	3	3
(Japan) S Shimabukuro	2	6	6
Q	(Japan) Y Shimizu	6	3	4
4	(United Kingdom) B Harris	2	6	6
Q	(United States) G Brymer	6	1	2
Q	(United Kingdom) S Parker	4	6	6
(Israel) Y Oliel	6	3	4

Quarterfinals
1	(Japan) Yo Watanuki	6^{7}	0
(Japan) S Shimabukuro	7^{9}	6
4	(United Kingdom) B Harris	4	4
Q	(United Kingdom) S Parker	6	6

Semifinals
(Japan) S Shimabukuro	6^{5}	4
Q	(United Kingdom) S Parker	7^{7}	6

=== Bottom half ===
First round
8	(India) P Gunneswaran	6	6
WC	(Thailand) Y Charoenphon	1	2
WC	(Thailand) P Isaro	5	1
(France) A Cazaux	7	6
(Israel) B Patael	7^{7}	4	3
(Italy) F Gaio	6^{5}	6	6
WC	(Thailand) Pol Wattanakul	5	2
3	(Vietnam) NH Lý	7	6
7	(Australia) D Sweeny	2	3
(Uzbekistan) D Istomin	6	6
Q	(New Zealand) A Rai	2	7	6^{6}
(Australia) O Jasika	6	5	7^{8}
Q	(Thailand) K Samrej	5	6	3
Q	(Japan) Makoto Ochi	7	3	6
(Australia) A Santillan	7	1	6
2	(Monaco) V Vacherot	5	6	4

Second round
8	(India) P Gunneswaran	6^{2}	1
(France) A Cazaux	7^{7}	6
(Italy) F Gaio	4	6	3
3	(Vietnam) NH Lý	6	4	6
(Uzbekistan) D Istomin	4	3
(Australia) O Jasika	6	6
Q	(Japan) M Ochi	6	1
(Australia) A Santillan	2	0^{r}

Quarterfinals
(France) A Cazaux	6	3	6
3	(Vietnam) NH Lý	3	6	0
(Australia) O Jasika	6	6
Q	(Japan) M Ochi	1	1

Semifinals
(France) A Cazaux	6	3
(Australia) O Jasika	0	0^{r}
