= 2024 Nonthaburi Challenger – Doubles =

Doubles
- 2024 Nonthaburi Challenger

Final
- Champions: (United Kingdom) Arthur Fery (United Kingdom) Joshua Paris
- Runners-up: (Thailand) Pruchya Isaro (Thailand) Maximus Jones
- Score: 6–2, 7–5

Events
Singles	Doubles
- Nonthaburi Challenger

Nam Ji-sung and Song Min-kyu were the defending champions but only Nam chose to defend his title, partnering Hans Hach Verdugo. Nam lost in the quarterfinals to Francis Alcantara and Kaichi Uchida.

Arthur Fery and Joshua Paris won the title after defeating Pruchya Isaro and Maximus Jones 6–2, 7–5 in the final.

== Seeds ==
1. (United Kingdom) Luke Johnson / (Tunisia) Skander Mansouri (semifinals)
2. (India) Saketh Myneni / (India) Ramkumar Ramanathan (first round)
3. (France) Manuel Guinard / (France) Grégoire Jacq (first round)
4. (Mexico) Hans Hach Verdugo / (South Korea) Nam Ji-sung (quarterfinals)

== Draw ==
Key

- Q = Qualifier
- WC = Wild card
- LL = Lucky loser
- Alt = Alternate
- ITF = ITF entry
- PR = Protected ranking
- SR = Special ranking
- SE = Special exempt
- JE = Junior exempt
- JR = Junior Accelerator Programme entrant
- CO = College Accelerator Programme entrant
- NG = Next Gen Accelerator Program entrant
- w/o = Walkover
- r = Retired
- d = Defaulted

First round
1	(United Kingdom) L Johnson (Tunisia) S Mansouri	6	5	[10]
Alt	(Japan) R Noguchi (France) A Weber	3	7	[3]
(Austria) D Novak (Australia) A Santillan	6	6
WC	(Thailand) Natthayut Nithithananont (Thailand) K Samrej	4	4
3	(France) M Guinard (France) G Jacq	5	6^{6}
(United Kingdom) A Fery (United Kingdom) J Paris	7	7^{8}
(India) RC Bollipalli (India) N Kaliyanda Poonacha	6	6
(Italy) M Cecchinato (Italy) G Fonio	3	1
(Philippines) FC Alcantara (Japan) K Uchida	3	6	[10]
(United Kingdom) S Duncan (Canada) K Stevenson	6	3	[4]
Alt	(Switzerland) L Castelnuovo (France) L Poullain	5	6^{1}
4	(Mexico) H Hach Verdugo (South Korea) J-s Nam	7	7^{7}
I Gakhov (Kazakhstan) G Lomakin	3	3
WC	(Thailand) P Isaro (Thailand) M Jones	6	6
(Chinese Taipei) R Ho (South Korea) Y-s Chung	7	3	[10]
2	(India) S Myneni (India) R Ramanathan	5	6	[8]

Quarterfinals
1	(United Kingdom) L Johnson (Tunisia) S Mansouri	6	6
(Austria) D Novak (Australia) A Santillan	3	4
(United Kingdom) A Fery (United Kingdom) J Paris	7^{7}	6
(India) RC Bollipalli (India) N Kaliyanda Poonacha	6^{4}	1
(Philippines) FC Alcantara (Japan) K Uchida	6	7
4	(Mexico) H Hach Verdugo (South Korea) J-s Nam	2	5
WC	(Thailand) P Isaro (Thailand) M Jones	7^{7}	7^{7}
(Chinese Taipei) R Ho (South Korea) Y-s Chung	6^{1}	6^{3}

Semifinals
1	(United Kingdom) L Johnson (Tunisia) S Mansouri	4	2
(United Kingdom) A Fery (United Kingdom) J Paris	6	6
(Philippines) FC Alcantara (Japan) K Uchida	4	6^{7}
WC	(Thailand) P Isaro (Thailand) M Jones	6	7^{9}

Final
(United Kingdom) A Fery (United Kingdom) J Paris	6	7
WC	(Thailand) P Isaro (Thailand) M Jones	2	5
