= 2023 Nonthaburi Challenger III =

- Date: 16 – 22 January
- Edition: 6th
- Surface: Hard
- Location: Nonthaburi, Thailand

Champions

Singles
- (Japan) Sho Shimabukuro

Doubles
- (South Korea) Nam Ji-sung / (South Korea) Song Min-kyu
← 2023 ·	Nonthaburi Challenger	· 2024 →

The 2023 Nonthaburi Challenger III was a professional tennis tournament played on hard courts. It was the 6th edition of the tournament which was part of the 2023 ATP Challenger Tour. It took place in Nonthaburi, Thailand from 16 to 22 January 2023.

== Singles main-draw entrants ==
=== Seeds ===
Country	Player	Rank^{1}	Seed
AUS	James Duckworth	157	1
SUI	Alexander Ritschard	174	2
FRA	Antoine Escoffier	192	3
FRA	Evan Furness	211	4
GBR	Paul Jubb	218	5
ROU	Nicholas David Ionel	229	6
~~GER~~	~~Peter Gojowczyk~~	~~232~~	~~7~~
CZE	Zdeněk Kolář	237	8

- ^{1} Rankings are as of 9 January 2023.

=== Other entrants ===
The following players received wildcards into the singles main draw:

- (Thailand) Yuttana Charoenphon
- (Thailand) Jirat Navasirisomboon
- (Thailand) Kasidit Samrej

The following players received entry into the singles main draw as alternates:

- (Italy) Stefano Travaglia
- (Kazakhstan) Beibit Zhukayev

The following players received entry from the qualifying draw:

- (France) Arthur Cazaux
- Evgeny Donskoy
- (Czech Republic) Jakub Menšík
- (Japan) Shintaro Mochizuki
- (Czech Republic) Dominik Palán
- (United Kingdom) Stuart Parker

The following player received entry as a lucky loser:

- (Italy) Giovanni Fonio

== Champions ==
=== Singles ===
- (Japan) Sho Shimabukuro def. (France) Arthur Cazaux 6–2, 7–5.

=== Doubles ===
- (South Korea) Nam Ji-sung / (South Korea) Song Min-kyu def. (United Kingdom) Jan Choinski / (United Kingdom) Stuart Parker 6–4, 6–4.
