= 2024 Nonthaburi Challenger II – Singles =

Singles
- 2024 Nonthaburi Challenger II

Final
- Champion: (Monaco) Valentin Vacherot
- Runner-up: (France) Manuel Guinard
- Score: 7–5, 7–6^{(7–4)}

Events
Singles	Doubles
- Nonthaburi Challenger

Valentin Vacherot was the defending champion and successfully defended his title, defeating Manuel Guinard 7–5, 7–6^{(7–4)} in the final.

== Seeds ==
1. (Austria) Dennis Novak (quarterfinals)
2. (Chinese Taipei) Jason Jung (second round)
3. (France) Lucas Poullain (first round)
4. Evgeny Donskoy (first round)
5. (Hong Kong) Coleman Wong (second round)
6. (United States) Tennys Sandgren (second round)
7. (Germany) Henri Squire (first round)
8. (United States) Brandon Holt (quarterfinals)

== Draw ==
Key

- Q = Qualifier
- WC = Wild card
- LL = Lucky loser
- Alt = Alternate
- ITF = ITF entry
- PR = Protected ranking
- SR = Special ranking
- SE = Special exempt
- JE = Junior exempt
- JR = Junior Accelerator Programme entrant
- CO = College Accelerator Programme entrant
- NG = Next Gen Accelerator Program entrant
- w/o = Walkover
- r = Retired
- d = Defaulted

=== Finals ===
Semifinals
(Monaco) Valentin Vacherot	w/o
(United Kingdom) Arthur Fery
Q	(Japan) Rio Noguchi	3	4
(France) Manuel Guinard	6	6

Final
(Monaco) Valentin Vacherot	7	7^{7}
(France) Manuel Guinard	5	6^{4}

=== Top half ===
First round
1	(Austria) D Novak	6	6
(Poland) D Michalski	3	0
WC	(Thailand) K Samrej	2	3
WC	(Thailand) W Trongcharoenchaikul	6	6
(Monaco) V Vacherot	6	6
Q	(India) R Ramanathan	4	3
(Lebanon) H Habib	1	4
6	(United States) T Sandgren	6	6
3	(France) L Poullain	0	2
(Italy) S Caruso	6	6
(Romania) ND Ionel	2	2
(United Kingdom) A Fery	6	6
Q	(Japan) H Moriya	6	6
(Canada) S Diez	3	0
Q	(Japan) Y Takahashi	6	1	6
7	(Germany) H Squire	4	6	3

Second round
1	(Austria) D Novak	7^{8}	6
WC	(Thailand) W Trongcharoenchaikul	6^{6}	0
(Monaco) V Vacherot	6^{2}	7^{7}	6
6	(United States) T Sandgren	7^{7}	6^{2}	4
(Italy) S Caruso	1	5
(United Kingdom) A Fery	6	7
Q	(Japan) H Moriya	7^{7}	6
Q	(Japan) Y Takahashi	6^{5}	1

Quarterfinals
1	(Austria) D Novak	6^{3}	4
(Monaco) V Vacherot	7^{7}	6
(United Kingdom) A Fery	6	6
Q	(Japan) H Moriya	3	4

Semifinals
(Monaco) V Vacherot	w/o
(United Kingdom) A Fery

=== Bottom half ===
First round
5	(Hong Kong) C Wong	7^{8}	6
(Chinese Taipei) C-h Tseng	6^{6}	3
(Australia) B Tomic	4	6	6^{5}
(Japan) Y Uchiyama	6	2	7^{7}
(Japan) K Uchida	7	2	6^{1}
Q	(Japan) R Noguchi	5	6	7^{7}
WC	(Thailand) M Jones	2	6	6
4	E Donskoy	6	3	1
8	(United States) B Holt	6	6
(South Korea) S-c Hong	2	2
Alt	(Czech Republic) D Palán	7^{7}	4	6^{2}
(Italy) G Fonio	6^{5}	6	7^{7}
(France) M Guinard	6	6
Q	(United States) Christian Langmo	3	3
Q	(Dominican Republic) N Hardt	4	2
2	(Chinese Taipei) J Jung	6	6

Second round
5	(Hong Kong) C Wong	7^{8}	1	4
(Japan) Y Uchiyama	6^{6}	6	6
Q	(Japan) R Noguchi	1	6	6
WC	(Thailand) M Jones	6	3	2
8	(United States) B Holt	7^{10}	6
(Italy) G Fonio	6^{8}	1
(France) M Guinard	6	7^{9}
2	(Chinese Taipei) J Jung	1	6^{7}

Quarterfinals
(Japan) Y Uchiyama	2	0^{r}
Q	(Japan) R Noguchi	6	1
8	(United States) B Holt	5	2
(France) M Guinard	7	6

Semifinals
Q	(Japan) R Noguchi	3	4
(France) M Guinard	6	6
