= 2026 Nonthaburi Challenger – Singles =

Singles
- 2026 Nonthaburi Challenger

Final
- Champion: (Japan) Rio Noguchi
- Runner-up: (Czech Republic) Marek Gengel
- Score: 6–3, 6–4

Events
Singles	Doubles
- Nonthaburi Challenger

Brandon Holt was the defending champion but chose not to defend his title.

Rio Noguchi won the title after defeating Marek Gengel 6–3, 6–4 in the final.

== Seeds ==
1. (Czech Republic) Zdeněk Kolář (semifinals)
2. (Italy) Lorenzo Giustino (quarterfinals, withdrew)
3. (Japan) Rio Noguchi (champion)
4. (Mexico) Rodrigo Pacheco Méndez (first round)
5. (Japan) Kaichi Uchida (second round)
6. (Austria) Joel Schwärzler (semifinals)
7. (United States) Andres Martin (first round)
8. (China) Sun Fajing (second round)

== Draw ==
Key

- Q = Qualifier
- WC = Wild card
- LL = Lucky loser
- Alt = Alternate
- ITF = ITF entry
- PR = Protected ranking
- SR = Special ranking
- SE = Special exempt
- JE = Junior exempt
- JR = Junior Accelerator Programme entrant
- CO = College Accelerator Programme entrant
- NG = Next Gen Accelerator Program entrant
- w/o = Walkover
- r = Retired
- d = Defaulted

=== Finals ===
Semifinals
1	(Czech Republic) Zdeněk Kolář	2	5
(Czech Republic) Marek Gengel	6	7
3	(Japan) Rio Noguchi	6	6
6	(Austria) Joel Schwärzler	2	2

Final
(Czech Republic) Marek Gengel	3	4
3	(Japan) Rio Noguchi	6	6

=== Top half ===
First round
1	(Czech Republic) Z Kolář	7	7
LL	(France) A Weber	5	5
WC	(Thailand) K Samrej	6	6
Q	(Japan) Hikaru Shiraishi	3	4
(Thailand) M Jones	4	4
Q	(Belgium) T Colson	6	6
Q	(Japan) H Matsuoka	2	6	2
8	(China) F Sun	6	2	6
4	(Mexico) R Pacheco Méndez	7	4	5
(France) R Bertrand	5	6	7
(Uzbekistan) S Fomin	7	3	7
(Japan) Renta Tokuda	5	6	5
(Japan) Y Shimizu	3	7^{7}	6
Q	(Japan) T Ichikawa	6	6^{3}	4
(Czech Republic) M Gengel	6	6
7	(United States) A Martin	2	4

Second round
1	(Czech Republic) Z Kolář	7	6
WC	(Thailand) K Samrej	5	4
Q	(Belgium) T Colson	7^{7}	3	6
8	(China) F Sun	6^{5}	6	2
(France) R Bertrand	3	4
(Uzbekistan) S Fomin	6	6
(Japan) Y Shimizu	6	1	4
(Czech Republic) M Gengel	3	6	6

Quarterfinals
1	(Czech Republic) Z Kolář	7	3	6
Q	(Belgium) T Colson	5	6	1
(Uzbekistan) S Fomin	1	4
(Czech Republic) M Gengel	6	6

Semifinals
1	(Czech Republic) Z Kolář	2	5
(Czech Republic) M Gengel	6	7

=== Bottom half ===
First round
5	(Japan) K Uchida	6	5	6
(France) C Denolly	2	7	3
Q	(Japan) Koki Matsuda	3	6^{2}
M Sharipov	6	7^{7}
WC	(Thailand) Pawit Sornlaksup	1	1
(Chinese Taipei) T-l Wu	6	6
(South Korea) Shin San-hui	1	4
3	(Japan) R Noguchi	6	6
6	(Austria) J Schwärzler	6	4	7^{7}
Q	(Japan) H Moriya	3	6	6^{5}
(South Korea) H Chung	6	6^{5}	3
(France) F Bax	3	7^{7}	6
WC	(Thailand) W Trongcharoenchaikul	3	6	2
(Japan) A Santillan	6	4	6
(Australia) Matthew Dellavedova	4	2
2	(Italy) L Giustino	6	6

Second round
5	(Japan) K Uchida	1	2
M Sharipov	6	6
(Chinese Taipei) T-l Wu	6	2	4
3	(Japan) R Noguchi	3	6	6
6	(Austria) J Schwärzler	3	6	6
(France) F Bax	6	4	0
(Japan) A Santillan	4	5
2	(Italy) L Giustino	6	7

Quarterfinals
M Sharipov	4	4
3	(Japan) R Noguchi	6	6
6	(Austria) J Schwärzler	w/o
2	(Italy) L Giustino

Semifinals
3	(Japan) R Noguchi	6	6
6	(Austria) J Schwärzler	2	2
