= 2025 Nonthaburi Challenger – Singles =

Singles
- 2025 Nonthaburi Challenger

Final
- Champion: Aslan Karatsev
- Runner-up: (France) Grégoire Barrère
- Score: 7–6^{(7–5)}, 7–5

Events
Singles	Doubles
← 2024 ·	Nonthaburi Challenger	· 2025 →

Wu Tung-lin was the defending champion but lost in the first round to Dalibor Svrčina.

Aslan Karatsev won the title after defeating Grégoire Barrère 7–6^{(7–5)}, 7–5 in the final.

== Seeds ==
1. (Argentina) Marco Trungelliti (second round)
2. (France) Grégoire Barrère (final)
3. (Germany) Henri Squire (first round)
4. (France) Titouan Droguet (second round)
5. (France) Clément Chidekh (second round)
6. (Kazakhstan) Timofey Skatov (first round)
7. (Romania) Filip Cristian Jianu (first round)
8. (Lebanon) Benjamin Hassan (second round)

== Draw ==
=== Key ===
- Q = Qualifier
- WC = Wild card
- LL = Lucky loser
- Alt = Alternate
- ITF = ITF entry
- PR = Protected ranking
- SR = Special ranking
- SE = Special exempt
- JE = Junior exempt
- JR = Junior Accelerator Programme entrant
- CO = College Accelerator Programme entrant
- NG = Next Gen Accelerator Program entrant
- w/o = Walkover
- r = Retired
- d = Defaulted

=== Finals ===
Semifinals
Aslan Karatsev	6	6
Q	(Belgium) Kimmer Coppejans	3	1
Q	(Japan) Rei Sakamoto	4	6	6^{6}
2	(France) Grégoire Barrère	6	3	7^{8}

Final
Aslan Karatsev	7^{7}	7
2	(France) Grégoire Barrère	6^{5}	5

=== Top half ===
First round
1	(Argentina) M Trungelliti	7	7^{7}
Q	(Thailand) M Jones	5	6^{4}
(Italy) E Dalla Valle	6	7^{10}
WC	(Thailand) Thanapet Chanta	4	6^{8}
(Venezuela) G Oliveira	4	3
A Karatsev	6	6
(Netherlands) J Sels	3	5
8	(Lebanon) B Hassan	6	7
3	(Germany) H Squire	7^{7}	4	6^{1}
(France) C Denolly	6^{4}	6	7^{7}
(Japan) R Noguchi	2	3
(Austria) L Neumayer	6	6
WC	(Thailand) K Samrej	4	6^{3}
Q	(France) C Tabur	6	7^{7}
Q	(Belgium) K Coppejans	7^{7}	4	6
7	(Romania) FC Jianu	6^{1}	6	2

Second round
1	(Argentina) M Trungelliti	6^{4}	3
(Italy) E Dalla Valle	7^{7}	6
A Karatsev	6	6
8	(Lebanon) B Hassan	3	2
(France) C Denolly	2	4
(Austria) L Neumayer	6	6
Q	(France) C Tabur	3	3
Q	(Belgium) K Coppejans	6	6

Quarterfinals
(Italy) E Dalla Valle	1	1
A Karatsev	6	6
(Austria) L Neumayer	3	2
Q	(Belgium) K Coppejans	6	6

Semifinals
A Karatsev	6	6
Q	(Belgium) K Coppejans	3	1

=== Bottom half ===
First round
5	(France) C Chidekh	6	6
(Ukraine) O Prihodko	3	2
Q	M Sharipov	6^{3}	6	4
Q	(Japan) R Sakamoto	7^{7}	2	6
(Italy) G Mager	7^{8}	2	6
Alt	(United States) M Cassone	6^{6}	6	3
WC	(Thailand) W Trongcharoenchaikul	6^{3}	2
4	(France) T Droguet	7^{7}	6
6	(Kazakhstan) T Skatov	6^{4}	6^{6}
(Uzbekistan) K Sultanov	7^{7}	7^{8}
(France) G Blancaneaux	5	5
Q	(Japan) H Moriya	7	7
(Chinese Taipei) T-l Wu	6	4	3
(Czech Republic) D Svrčina	2	6	6
(Italy) F Arnaboldi	4	6^{3}
2	(France) G Barrère	6	7^{7}

Second round
5	(France) C Chidekh	3	0
Q	(Japan) R Sakamoto	6	6
(Italy) G Mager	6	3	6
4	(France) T Droguet	4	6	3
(Uzbekistan) K Sultanov	6	6
Q	(Japan) H Moriya	4	2
(Czech Republic) D Svrčina	5	6^{5}
2	(France) G Barrère	7	7^{7}

Quarterfinals
Q	(Japan) R Sakamoto	4
(Italy) G Mager	1^{r}
(Uzbekistan) K Sultanov	6^{5}	1
2	(France) G Barrère	7^{7}	6

Semifinals
Q	(Japan) R Sakamoto	4	6	6^{6}
2	(France) G Barrère	6	3	7^{8}
