= 2023 Nonthaburi Challenger – Doubles =

Doubles
- 2023 Nonthaburi Challenger

Final
- Champions: (Czech Republic) Marek Gengel (Czech Republic) Adam Pavlásek
- Runners-up: (United States) Robert Galloway (Mexico) Hans Hach Verdugo
- Score: 7–6^{(7–4)}, 6–4

Events
Singles	Doubles
- Nonthaburi Challenger

Chung Yun-seong and Ajeet Rai were the defending champions but chose not to defend their title.

Marek Gengel and Adam Pavlásek won the title after defeating Robert Galloway and Hans Hach Verdugo 7–6^{(7–4)}, 6–4 in the final.

== Seeds ==
1. (United States) Robert Galloway / (Mexico) Hans Hach Verdugo (final)
2. (Czech Republic) Marek Gengel / (Czech Republic) Adam Pavlásek (champions)
3. (South Korea) Nam Ji-sung / (South Korea) Song Min-kyu (semifinals)
4. (France) Luca Sanchez / (Canada) Kelsey Stevenson (first round)

== Draw ==
Key

- Q = Qualifier
- WC = Wild card
- LL = Lucky loser
- Alt = Alternate
- ITF = ITF entry
- PR = Protected ranking
- SR = Special ranking
- SE = Special exempt
- JE = Junior exempt
- JR = Junior Accelerator Programme entrant
- CO = College Accelerator Programme entrant
- NG = Next Gen Accelerator Program entrant
- w/o = Walkover
- r = Retired
- d = Defaulted

First round
1	(United States) R Galloway (Mexico) H Hach Verdugo	7^{7}	6
Alt	(United States) Ezekiel Clark (United States) A Perez	6^{4}	3
(France) D Added (France) L Pouille	2	7^{10}	[11]
(Germany) M Moraing (Austria) D Novak	6	6^{8}	[9]
4	(France) L Sanchez (Canada) K Stevenson	4	4
E Donskoy (South Africa) L Harris	6	6
WC	(Thailand) P Isaro (Thailand) K Samrej	4	1
(Hungary) F Marozsán (Czech Republic) M Vrbenský	6	6
(Argentina) TA Tirante (Argentina) M Trungelliti	4	7	[11]
WC	(Thailand) M Jones (Thailand) P Kovapitukted	6	5	[9]
(Australia) D Kelly (Australia) M Purcell	6^{0}	6^{2}
3	(South Korea) J-s Nam (South Korea) M-k Song	7^{7}	7^{7}
(Indonesia) C Rungkat (India) V Vardhan	3	4
(United States) E King (United States) T Sandgren	6	6
(Philippines) FC Alcantara (Chinese Taipei) Y-h Hsu	7	2	[5]
2	(Czech Republic) M Gengel (Czech Republic) A Pavlásek	5	6	[10]

Quarterfinals
1	(United States) R Galloway (Mexico) H Hach Verdugo	3	6	[10]
(France) D Added (France) L Pouille	6	3	[8]
E Donskoy (South Africa) L Harris	6	6
(Hungary) F Marozsán (Czech Republic) M Vrbenský	4	3
(Argentina) TA Tirante (Argentina) M Trungelliti
3	(South Korea) J-s Nam (South Korea) M-k Song	w/o
(United States) E King (United States) T Sandgren	3	7^{7}	[6]
2	(Czech Republic) M Gengel (Czech Republic) A Pavlásek	6	6^{4}	[10]

Semifinals
1	(United States) R Galloway (Mexico) H Hach Verdugo	w/o
E Donskoy (South Africa) L Harris
3	(South Korea) J-s Nam (South Korea) M-k Song	4	3
2	(Czech Republic) M Gengel (Czech Republic) A Pavlásek	6	6

Final
1	(United States) R Galloway (Mexico) H Hach Verdugo	6^{4}	4
2	(Czech Republic) M Gengel (Czech Republic) A Pavlásek	7^{7}	6
