= 2024 Nonthaburi Challenger =

- Date: 1 – 6 January
- Edition: 7th
- Surface: Hard
- Location: Nonthaburi, Thailand

Champions

Singles
- (Monaco) Valentin Vacherot

Doubles
- (United Kingdom) Arthur Fery / (United Kingdom) Joshua Paris
← 2023 ·	Nonthaburi Challenger	· 2024 →

The 2024 Nonthaburi Challenger was a professional tennis tournament played on hard courts. It was the 7th edition of the tournament which was part of the 2024 ATP Challenger Tour. It took place in Nonthaburi, Thailand from 1 to 6 January 2024.

== Singles main-draw entrants ==
=== Seeds ===
Country	Player	Rank^{1}	Seed
AUT	Dennis Novak	165	1
CZE	Zdeněk Kolář	174	2
ITA	Mattia Bellucci	177	3
	Ivan Gakhov	180	4
BEL	Kimmer Coppejans	186	5
~~KAZ~~	~~Beibit Zhukayev~~	~~188~~	~~6~~
ITA	Stefano Travaglia	193	7
ITA	Marco Cecchinato	198	8

- ^{1} Rankings are as of 25 December 2023.

=== Other entrants ===
The following players received wildcards into the singles main draw:

- (Thailand) Maximus Jones
- (Thailand) Kasidit Samrej
- (Thailand) Wishaya Trongcharoenchaikul

The following players received entry from the qualifying draw:

- (South Korea) Hong Seong-chan
- (Japan) Rio Noguchi
- (France) Lucas Pouille
- Marat Sharipov
- (Monaco) Valentin Vacherot
- (France) Arthur Weber

The following player received entry as a lucky loser:

- (Chinese Taipei) Tseng Chun-hsin

== Champions ==
=== Singles ===
- (Monaco) Valentin Vacherot def. (France) Lucas Pouille 3–2 ret.

=== Doubles ===
- (United Kingdom) Arthur Fery / (United Kingdom) Joshua Paris def. (Thailand) Pruchya Isaro / (Thailand) Maximus Jones 6–2, 7–5.
