= 2022 Nonthaburi Challenger II =

- Date: 29 August – 4 September
- Edition: 2nd
- Surface: Hard
- Location: Nonthaburi, Thailand

Champions

Singles
- (France) Arthur Cazaux

Doubles
- (Zimbabwe) Benjamin Lock / (Japan) Yuta Shimizu
← 2022 ·	Nonthaburi Challenger	· 2022 →

The 2022 Nonthaburi Challenger II was a professional tennis tournament played on hard courts. It was the 2nd edition of the tournament which was part of the 2022 ATP Challenger Tour. It took place in Nonthaburi, Thailand from 29 August to 4 September 2022.

== Singles main-draw entrants ==
=== Seeds ===
Country	Player	Rank^{1}	Seed
JPN	Yosuke Watanuki	229	1
GBR	Alastair Gray	256	2
~~JPN~~	~~Yasutaka Uchiyama~~	~~264~~	~~3~~
KAZ	Denis Yevseyev	266	4
BRA	Gabriel Décamps	280	5
GBR	Billy Harris	298	6
UKR	Illya Marchenko	308	7
~~GER~~	~~Nicola Kuhn~~	~~318~~	~~8~~

- ^{1} Rankings are as of 22 August 2022.

=== Other entrants ===
The following players received wildcards into the singles main draw:

- (Thailand) Thanapet Chanta
- (Thailand) Krittin Koaykul
- (Thailand) Kasidit Samrej

The following player received entry into the singles main draw as a special exempt:

- (Monaco) Valentin Vacherot

The following player received entry into the singles main draw as an alternate:

- (Australia) Omar Jasika

The following players received entry from the qualifying draw:

- (United Kingdom) Charles Broom
- (France) Arthur Cazaux
- (South Korea) Chung Yun-seong
- (Israel) Ben Patael
- (Australia) Tristan Schoolkate
- (Kazakhstan) Beibit Zhukayev

The following players received entry as lucky losers:

- (Israel) Daniel Cukierman
- (Australia) James McCabe
- (Japan) Yuta Shimizu

== Champions ==
=== Singles ===
- (France) Arthur Cazaux def. (Australia) Omar Jasika 7–6^{(8–6)}, 6–4.

=== Doubles ===
- (Zimbabwe) Benjamin Lock / (Japan) Yuta Shimizu def. (Philippines) Francis Alcantara / (Indonesia) Christopher Rungkat 6–1, 6–3.
