= 2025 Nonthaburi Challenger III =

- Date: 13 – 19 January
- Edition: 13th
- Surface: Hard
- Location: Nonthaburi, Thailand

Champions

Singles
- (United States) Brandon Holt

Doubles
- (Chinese Taipei) Ray Ho / (Austria) Neil Oberleitner
← 2025 ·	Nonthaburi Challenger	· 2026 →

The 2025 Nonthaburi Challenger III was a professional tennis tournament played on hard courts. It was the 13th edition of the tournament which was part of the 2025 ATP Challenger Tour. It took place in Nonthaburi, Thailand from 13 to 19 January 2025.

== Singles main-draw entrants ==
=== Seeds ===
Country	Player	Rank^{1}	Seed
CZE	Vít Kopřiva	125	1
FRA	Hugo Grenier	154	2
MON	Valentin Vacherot	162	3
USA	Zachary Svajda	165	4
JPN	Shintaro Mochizuki	170	5
HKG	Coleman Wong	172	6
GER	Henri Squire	178	7
KAZ	Dmitry Popko	183	8

- ^{1} Rankings are as of 6 January 2025.

=== Other entrants ===
The following players received wildcards into the singles main draw:

- (Thailand) Thanapet Chanta
- (Thailand) Maximus Jones
- (Thailand) Wishaya Trongcharoenchaikul

The following players received entry into the singles main draw as alternates:

- (Italy) Federico Arnaboldi
- (Japan) Shintaro Mochizuki
- (Chinese Taipei) Wu Tung-lin

The following players received entry from the qualifying draw:

- (Switzerland) Rémy Bertola
- (United States) Murphy Cassone
- (Italy) Francesco Maestrelli
- (Japan) Rio Noguchi
- (China) Sun Fajing
- (France) Clément Tabur

== Champions ==
=== Singles ===
- (United States) Brandon Holt def. (Czech Republic) Vít Kopřiva 6–3, 6–2.

=== Doubles ===
- (Chinese Taipei) Ray Ho / (Austria) Neil Oberleitner def. (Thailand) Pruchya Isaro / (China) Wang Aoran 6–3, 6–4.
