= 2024 Nonthaburi Challenger II – Doubles =

Doubles
- 2024 Nonthaburi Challenger II

Final
- Champions: (France) Manuel Guinard (France) Grégoire Jacq
- Runners-up: (Philippines) Francis Alcantara (China) Sun Fajing
- Score: 6–4, 7–6^{(7–5)}

Events
Singles	Doubles
- Nonthaburi Challenger

Arthur Fery and Joshua Paris were the defending champions but withdrew from their quarterfinals match against Luke Johnson and Skander Mansouri.

Manuel Guinard and Grégoire Jacq won the title after defeating Francis Alcantara and Sun Fajing 6–4, 7–6^{(7–5)} in the final.

== Seeds ==
1. (United Kingdom) Luke Johnson / (Tunisia) Skander Mansouri (semifinals)
2. (India) Saketh Myneni / (India) Ramkumar Ramanathan (quarterfinals)
3. (France) Manuel Guinard / (France) Grégoire Jacq (champions)
4. (Mexico) Hans Hach Verdugo / (South Korea) Nam Ji-sung (quarterfinals)

== Draw ==
Key

- Q = Qualifier
- WC = Wild card
- LL = Lucky loser
- Alt = Alternate
- ITF = ITF entry
- PR = Protected ranking
- SR = Special ranking
- SE = Special exempt
- JE = Junior exempt
- JR = Junior Accelerator Programme entrant
- CO = College Accelerator Programme entrant
- NG = Next Gen Accelerator Program entrant
- w/o = Walkover
- r = Retired
- d = Defaulted

First round
1	(United Kingdom) L Johnson (Tunisia) S Mansouri	6	6
(Pakistan) A-u-H Qureshi (Indonesia) C Rungkat	1	4
(Romania) ND Ionel (Germany) K Wehnelt	1	4
(United Kingdom) A Fery (United Kingdom) J Paris	6	6
3	(France) M Guinard (France) G Jacq	6	7
(Switzerland) L Castelnuovo; E Donskoy	1	5
(India) RC Bollipalli (India) N Kaliyanda Poonacha	6	6
(Austria) D Novak (Australia) A Santillan	2	4
(Philippines) FC Alcantara (China) F Sun	6	7^{7}
(United Kingdom) S Duncan (Canada) K Stevenson	4	6^{4}
WC	(Thailand) P Isaro (Thailand) M Jones	3	3
4	(Mexico) H Hach Verdugo (South Korea) J-s Nam	6	6
WC	(Thailand) Natthayut Nithithananont (Thailand) K Samrej	3	7^{7}	[3]
Alt	(Italy) S Caruso (Italy) G Fonio	6	6^{3}	[10]
(Japan) T Matsui (Japan) K Uesugi	3	5
2	(India) S Myneni (India) R Ramanathan	6	7

Quarterfinals
1	(United Kingdom) L Johnson (Tunisia) S Mansouri	w/o
(United Kingdom) A Fery (United Kingdom) J Paris
3	(France) M Guinard (France) G Jacq	7^{7}	4	[10]
(India) RC Bollipalli (India) N Kaliyanda Poonacha	6^{3}	6	[6]
(Philippines) FC Alcantara (China) F Sun	6	6
4	(Mexico) H Hach Verdugo (South Korea) J-s Nam	1	2
Alt	(Italy) S Caruso (Italy) G Fonio	6	6
2	(India) S Myneni (India) R Ramanathan	3	2

Semifinals
1	(United Kingdom) L Johnson (Tunisia) S Mansouri	4	6^{3}
3	(France) M Guinard (France) G Jacq	6	7^{7}
(Philippines) FC Alcantara (China) F Sun	6	6
Alt	(Italy) S Caruso (Italy) G Fonio	4	3

Final
3	(France) M Guinard (France) G Jacq	6	7^{7}
(Philippines) FC Alcantara (China) F Sun	4	6^{5}
