= 2023 Nonthaburi Challenger II – Singles =

Singles
- 2023 Nonthaburi Challenger II

Final
- Champion: (France) Arthur Cazaux
- Runner-up: (South Africa) Lloyd Harris
- Score: 7–6^{(7–5)}, 6–2

Events
Singles	Doubles
- Nonthaburi Challenger

Dennis Novak was the defending champion but lost in the semifinals to Arthur Cazaux.

Cazaux won the title after defeating Lloyd Harris 7–6^{(7–5)}, 6–2 in the final.

== Seeds ==
1. (Austria) Dennis Novak (semifinals)
2. (South Africa) Lloyd Harris (final)
3. (Poland) Kacper Żuk (first round)
4. (Czech Republic) Zdeněk Kolář (first round)
5. (Belgium) Michael Geerts (second round)
6. (Poland) Daniel Michalski (quarterfinals)
7. (Japan) Sho Shimabukuro (first round)
8. (United States) Tennys Sandgren (quarterfinals)

== Draw ==
Key

- Q = Qualifier
- WC = Wild card
- LL = Lucky loser
- Alt = Alternate
- ITF = ITF entry
- PR = Protected ranking
- SR = Special ranking
- SE = Special exempt
- JE = Junior exempt
- JR = Junior Accelerator Programme entrant
- CO = College Accelerator Programme entrant
- NG = Next Gen Accelerator Program entrant
- w/o = Walkover
- r = Retired
- d = Defaulted

=== Finals ===
Semifinals
1	(Austria) Dennis Novak	4	6	2
Q	(France) Arthur Cazaux	6	4	6
Q	(Chinese Taipei) Jason Jung	1	4
2	(South Africa) Lloyd Harris	6	6

Final
Q	(France) Arthur Cazaux	7^{7}	6
2	(South Africa) Lloyd Harris	6^{5}	2

=== Top half ===
First round
1	(Austria) D Novak	6	7^{9}
Q	(Germany) H Squire	3	6^{7}
(France) V Royer	6	0
Alt	(United Kingdom) B Harris	1	0^{r}
(Czech Republic) M Gengel	6	6
(Japan) H Moriya	1	2
WC	(Thailand) P Kovapitukted	1	3
5	(Belgium) M Geerts	6	6
4	(Czech Republic) Z Kolář	3	3
Alt	(India) P Gunneswaran	6	6
Q	(Italy) G Fonio	4	4
Q	(France) A Cazaux	6	6
(Lebanon) B Hassan	7	7
Q	(United States) A Ayeni	5	5
(France) D Added	6	6^{2}	4
8	(United States) T Sandgren	2	7^{7}	6

Second round
1	(Austria) D Novak	6	6
(France) V Royer	2	3
(Czech Republic) M Gengel	2	7^{7}	7
5	(Belgium) M Geerts	6	6^{0}	5
Alt	(India) P Gunneswaran	7^{7}	6^{4}	3
Q	(France) A Cazaux	6^{5}	7^{7}	6
(Lebanon) B Hassan	3	6	6^{6}
8	(United States) T Sandgren	6	1	7^{8}

Quarterfinals
1	(Austria) D Novak	6	6
(Czech Republic) M Gengel	3	3
Q	(France) A Cazaux	6	6
8	(United States) T Sandgren	3	3

Semifinals
1	(Austria) D Novak	4	6	2
Q	(France) A Cazaux	6	4	6

=== Bottom half ===
First round
7	(Japan) S Shimabukuro	4	1
Q	(Chinese Taipei) J Jung	6	6
(Kazakhstan) B Zhukayev	7^{7}	7^{7}
WC	(Thailand) W Trongcharoenchaikul	6^{2}	6^{5}
(Kazakhstan) D Yevseyev	4	6^{1}
Q	E Donskoy	6	7^{7}
(Japan) Y Uchiyama	6	6
3	(Poland) K Żuk	2	1
6	(Poland) D Michalski	3	7	6
(Japan) S Mochizuki	6	5	3
(Italy) S Travaglia	6^{5}	7	6
(Italy) A Arnaboldi	7^{7}	5	3
(India) M Sasikumar	4	4
(Germany) M Moraing	6	6
WC	(Thailand) K Samrej	1	2
2	(South Africa) L Harris	6	6

Second round
Q	(Chinese Taipei) J Jung	6	7^{7}
(Kazakhstan) B Zhukayev	4	6^{3}
Q	E Donskoy	6	7^{7}
(Japan) Y Uchiyama	4	6^{3}
6	(Poland) D Michalski	7^{7}	7^{10}
(Italy) S Travaglia	6^{4}	6^{8}
(Germany) M Moraing	1	3
2	(South Africa) L Harris	6	6

Quarterfinals
Q	(Chinese Taipei) J Jung	4	7	6
Q	E Donskoy	6	5	3
6	(Poland) D Michalski	4	3
2	(South Africa) L Harris	6	6

Semifinals
Q	(Chinese Taipei) J Jung	1	4
2	(South Africa) L Harris	6	6
