= 2024 Nonthaburi Challenger IV =

- Date: 24 – 29 September
- Edition: 10th
- Surface: Hard
- Location: Nonthaburi, Thailand

Champions

Singles
- (Chinese Taipei) Wu Tung-lin

Doubles
- (Australia) Blake Ellis / (Australia) Adam Walton
← 2024 ·	Nonthaburi Challenger	· 2025 →

The 2024 Nonthaburi Challenger IV was a professional tennis tournament played on hard courts. It was the 10th edition of the tournament which was part of the 2024 ATP Challenger Tour. It took place in Nonthaburi, Thailand from 24 to 29 September 2024.

== Singles main-draw entrants ==
=== Seeds ===
Country	Player	Rank^{1}	Seed
FRA	Arthur Cazaux	88	1
AUS	Adam Walton	94	2
CAN	Gabriel Diallo	104	3
GER	Maximilian Marterer	105	4
	Aslan Karatsev	115	5
ARG	Marco Trungelliti	138	6
USA	Mitchell Krueger	140	7
HKG	Coleman Wong	141	8

- ^{1} Rankings are as of 16 September 2024.

=== Other entrants ===
The following players received wildcards into the singles main draw:

- (Thailand) Thanapet Chanta
- (Thailand) Kasidit Samrej
- (Thailand) Wishaya Trongcharoenchaikul

The following players received entry from the qualifying draw:

- (Ukraine) Yurii Dzhavakian
- (Malaysia) Mitsuki Wei Kang Leong
- (South Korea) Nam Ji-sung
- (Japan) Yuta Shimizu
- Ilia Simakin
- (Chinese Taipei) Wu Tung-lin

== Champions ==
=== Singles ===
- (Chinese Taipei) Wu Tung-lin def. (United States) Mackenzie McDonald 6–3, 7–6^{(7–4)}.

=== Doubles ===
- (Australia) Blake Ellis / (Australia) Adam Walton def. (India) Rithvik Choudary Bollipalli / (India) Arjun Kadhe 3–6, 7–5, [10–8].
