= 2022 Nonthaburi Challenger II – Singles =

Singles
- 2022 Nonthaburi Challenger II

Final
- Champion: (France) Arthur Cazaux
- Runner-up: (Australia) Omar Jasika
- Score: 7–6^{(8–6)}, 6–4

Events
Singles	Doubles
- Nonthaburi Challenger

Valentin Vacherot was the defending champion but lost in the quarterfinals to Beibit Zhukayev.

Arthur Cazaux won the title after defeating Omar Jasika 7–6^{(8–6)}, 6–4 in the final.

== Seeds ==
1. (Japan) Yosuke Watanuki (second round)
2. (United Kingdom) Alastair Gray (first round)
3. (Japan) Yasutaka Uchiyama (withdrew)
4. (Kazakhstan) Denis Yevseyev (first round)
5. (Brazil) Gabriel Décamps (semifinals, retired)
6. (United Kingdom) Billy Harris (second round)
7. (Ukraine) Illya Marchenko (second round)
8. (Germany) Nicola Kuhn (withdrew)

== Draw ==
Key

- Q = Qualifier
- WC = Wild card
- LL = Lucky loser
- Alt = Alternate
- ITF = ITF entry
- PR = Protected ranking
- SR = Special ranking
- SE = Special exempt
- JE = Junior exempt
- JR = Junior Accelerator Programme entrant
- CO = College Accelerator Programme entrant
- NG = Next Gen Accelerator Program entrant
- w/o = Walkover
- r = Retired
- d = Defaulted

=== Finals ===
Semifinals
Q	(Kazakhstan) Beibit Zhukayev	1	6^{6}
Q	(France) Arthur Cazaux	6	7^{8}
5	(Brazil) Gabriel Décamps	7	4	0^{r}
Alt	(Australia) Omar Jasika	5	6	3

Final
Q	(France) Arthur Cazaux	7^{8}	6
Alt	(Australia) Omar Jasika	6^{6}	4

=== Top half ===
First round
1	(Japan) Yo Watanuki	6	6
A Kachmazov	1	3
(Australia) A Santillan	1	6	3
SE	(Monaco) V Vacherot	6	2	6
LL	(Israel) D Cukierman	2	4
(Japan) S Shimabukuro	6	6
Q	(Kazakhstan) B Zhukayev	6	7^{10}
LL	(Japan) Y Shimizu	3	6^{8}
4	(Kazakhstan) D Yevseyev	6	0	0
(Australia) D Sweeny	3	6	6
(Zimbabwe) B Lock	5	3
E Donskoy	7	6
WC	(Thailand) Krittin Koaykul	2	1
Q	(France) A Cazaux	6	6
Q	(South Korea) Y-s Chung	3	6	4
6	(United Kingdom) B Harris	6	4	6

Second round
1	(Japan) Yo Watanuki	6^{2}	3
SE	(Monaco) V Vacherot	7^{7}	6
(Japan) S Shimabukuro	6	3	4
Q	(Kazakhstan) B Zhukayev	2	6	6
(Australia) D Sweeny	6	6
E Donskoy	4	4
Q	(France) A Cazaux	6	6
6	(United Kingdom) B Harris	1	1

Quarterfinals
SE	(Monaco) V Vacherot	5	6	6^{2}
Q	(Kazakhstan) B Zhukayev	7	3	7^{7}
(Australia) D Sweeny	1	4
Q	(France) A Cazaux	6	6

Semifinals
Q	(Kazakhstan) B Zhukayev	1	6^{6}
Q	(France) A Cazaux	6	7^{8}

=== Bottom half ===
First round
5	(Brazil) G Décamps	6	6
(Uzbekistan) S Fomin	2	2
WC	(Thailand) K Samrej	7^{8}	6
WC	(Thailand) Thanapet Chanta	6^{6}	1
(China) Y Bu	7^{9}	2	2
(Italy) F Gaio	6^{7}	6	6
(Vietnam) NH Lý	3	6	6
LL	(Australia) J McCabe	6	3	2
7	(Ukraine) I Marchenko	6	6
(Israel) Y Oliel	3	2
Alt	(Australia) O Jasika	7	6
(India) P Gunneswaran	5	3
Q	(United Kingdom) C Broom	7	7^{7}
Q	(Australia) T Schoolkate	5	6^{4}
Q	(Israel) B Patael	6	4	6
2	(United Kingdom) A Gray	3	6	4

Second round
5	(Brazil) G Décamps	6	6
WC	(Thailand) K Samrej	4	4
(Italy) F Gaio	7	7
(Vietnam) NH Lý	5	5
7	(Ukraine) I Marchenko	6	3	4
Alt	(Australia) O Jasika	2	6	6
Q	(United Kingdom) C Broom	3	6	7^{9}
Q	(Israel) B Patael	6	3	6^{7}

Quarterfinals
5	(Brazil) G Décamps	6	7
(Italy) F Gaio	3	5
Alt	(Australia) O Jasika	6	1	6
Q	(United Kingdom) C Broom	1	6	3

Semifinals
5	(Brazil) G Décamps	7	4	0^{r}
Alt	(Australia) O Jasika	5	6	3
