= 2024 Nonthaburi Challenger III =

- Date: 15 – 21 January
- Edition: 9th
- Surface: Hard
- Location: Nonthaburi, Thailand

Champions

Singles
- (Italy) Matteo Gigante

Doubles
- (United Kingdom) Luke Johnson / (Tunisia) Skander Mansouri
← 2024 ·	Nonthaburi Challenger	· 2024 →

The 2024 Nonthaburi Challenger III was a professional tennis tournament played on hard courts. It was the 9th edition of the tournament which was part of the 2024 ATP Challenger Tour. It took place in Nonthaburi, Thailand from 15 to 21 January 2024.

== Singles main-draw entrants ==
=== Seeds ===
Country	Player	Rank^{1}	Seed
CRO	Duje Ajduković	143	1
GER	Benjamin Hassan	150	2
JPN	Sho Shimabukuro	152	3
NED	Gijs Brouwer	154	4
~~CZE~~	~~Dalibor Svrčina~~	~~166~~	~~5~~
UKR	Vitaliy Sachko	169	6
ITA	Matteo Gigante	172	7
ITA	Mattia Bellucci	180	8

- ^{1} Rankings are as of 8 January 2024.

=== Other entrants ===
The following players received wildcards into the singles main draw:

- (Thailand) Thanapet Chanta
- (Thailand) Maximus Jones
- (Thailand) Kasidit Samrej

The following players received entry into the singles main draw as alternates:

- (Chinese Taipei) Jason Jung
- (France) Clément Tabur

The following players received entry from the qualifying draw:

- (China) Bai Yan
- (Italy) Giovanni Fonio
- (South Korea) Hong Seong-chan
- (United States) Tennys Sandgren
- (Australia) Akira Santillan
- (France) Arthur Weber

The following player received entry as a lucky loser:

- (United States) Nicolas Moreno de Alboran

== Champions ==
=== Singles ===
- (Italy) Matteo Gigante def. (South Korea) Hong Seong-chan 6–4, 6–1.

=== Doubles ===
- (United Kingdom) Luke Johnson / (Tunisia) Skander Mansouri def. (India) Rithvik Choudary Bollipalli / (India) Niki Kaliyanda Poonacha 7–5, 6–4.
