= 2022 Nonthaburi Challenger =

- Date: 22–28 August
- Edition: 1st
- Surface: Hard
- Location: Nonthaburi, Thailand

Champions

Singles
- (Monaco) Valentin Vacherot

Doubles
- Evgeny Donskoy / Alibek Kachmazov
- Nonthaburi Challenger

The 2022 Nonthaburi Challenger was a professional tennis tournament played on hard courts. It was the 1st edition of the tournament which was part of the 2022 ATP Challenger Tour. It took place in Nonthaburi, Thailand from 22 to 28 August 2022.

== Singles main-draw entrants ==
=== Seeds ===
Country	Player	Rank^{1}	Seed
GBR	Alastair Gray	255	1
JPN	Yasutaka Uchiyama	260	2
KAZ	Denis Yevseyev	263	3
GBR	Billy Harris	294	4
BRA	Gabriel Décamps	302	5
ISR	Yshai Oliel	307	6
GER	Nicola Kuhn	320	7
UKR	Illya Marchenko	322	8

- ^{1} Rankings are as of 15 August 2022.

=== Other entrants ===
The following players received wildcards into the singles main draw:

- (Thailand) Yuttana Charoenphon
- (Thailand) Kasidit Samrej
- (Thailand) Wishaya Trongcharoenchaikul

The following players received entry from the qualifying draw:

- (United States) Gage Brymer
- (South Korea) Hong Seong-chan
- (France) Kyrian Jacquet
- (Australia) Dayne Kelly
- (Japan) Yuta Shimizu
- (Monaco) Valentin Vacherot

== Champions ==
=== Singles ===
- (Monaco) Valentin Vacherot def. (Vietnam) Lý Hoàng Nam 6–3, 7–6^{(7–4)}.

=== Doubles ===
- Evgeny Donskoy / Alibek Kachmazov def. (South Korea) Nam Ji-sung / (South Korea) Song Min-kyu 6–3, 1–6, [10–7].
