= 2024 Nonthaburi Challenger III – Singles =

Singles
- 2024 Nonthaburi Challenger III

Final
- Champion: (Italy) Matteo Gigante
- Runner-up: (South Korea) Hong Seong-chan
- Score: 6–4, 6–1

Events
Singles	Doubles
- Nonthaburi Challenger

Valentin Vacherot was the two-time defending champion but chose not to defend his title.

Matteo Gigante won the title after defeating Hong Seong-chan 6–4, 6–1 in the final.

== Seeds ==
1. (Croatia) Duje Ajduković (quarterfinals)
2. (Germany) Benjamin Hassan (second round)
3. (Japan) Sho Shimabukuro (second round)
4. (Netherlands) Gijs Brouwer (first round)
5. (Czech Republic) Dalibor Svrčina (withdrew)
6. (Ukraine) Vitaliy Sachko (first round, retired)
7. (Italy) Matteo Gigante (champion)
8. (Italy) Mattia Bellucci (first round)

== Draw ==
Key

- Q = Qualifier
- WC = Wild card
- LL = Lucky loser
- Alt = Alternate
- ITF = ITF entry
- PR = Protected ranking
- SR = Special ranking
- SE = Special exempt
- JE = Junior exempt
- JR = Junior Accelerator Programme entrant
- CO = College Accelerator Programme entrant
- NG = Next Gen Accelerator Program entrant
- w/o = Walkover
- r = Retired
- d = Defaulted

=== Finals ===
Semifinals
7	(Italy) Matteo Gigante	6	7
Alt	(Chinese Taipei) Jason Jung	3	5
Q	(Italy) Giovanni Fonio	4	1
Q	(South Korea) Hong Seong-chan	6	6

Final
7	(Italy) Matteo Gigante	6	6
Q	(South Korea) Hong Seong-chan	4	1

=== Top half ===
First round
1	(Croatia) D Ajduković	7	4	6
(Italy) S Travaglia	5	6	4
WC	(Thailand) Thanapet Chanta	7^{7}	4
Q	(Australia) A Santillan	6^{4}	1^{r}
(Belgium) G Onclin	6	6
Alt	(France) C Tabur	4	3
Q	(France) A Weber	6	1	2
7	(Italy) M Gigante	1	6	6
4	(Netherlands) G Brouwer	3	1
(United Kingdom) R Peniston	6	6
(Chinese Taipei) T-l Wu	5	7	6
(Estonia) M Lajal	7	5	3
WC	(Thailand) M Jones	2	1
Alt	(Chinese Taipei) J Jung	6	6
(Tunisia) A Dougaz	4
6	(Ukraine) V Sachko	1^{r}

Second round
1	(Croatia) D Ajduković	6^{6}	6	6
WC	(Thailand) T Chanta	7^{8}	4	0
(Belgium) G Onclin	2	7^{9}	2
7	(Italy) M Gigante	6	6^{7}	6
(United Kingdom) R Peniston	6	7^{7}
(Chinese Taipei) T-l Wu	3	6^{5}
Alt	(Chinese Taipei) J Jung	6	7^{7}
(Tunisia) A Dougaz	4	6^{4}

Quarterfinals
1	(Croatia) D Ajduković	6	3	2
7	(Italy) M Gigante	3	6	6
(United Kingdom) R Peniston	4	3
Alt	(Chinese Taipei) J Jung	6	6

Semifinals
7	(Italy) M Gigante	6	7
Alt	(Chinese Taipei) J Jung	3	5

=== Bottom half ===
First round
LL	(United States) N Moreno de Alboran	6	7^{7}
(Italy) F Passaro	3	6^{4}
(Chinese Taipei) Y-h Hsu	4	5
Q	(United States) T Sandgren	6	7
(France) Jules Marie	2	1^{r}
Q	(Italy) G Fonio	6	4
Q	(China) Y Bai	1	3
3	(Japan) S Shimabukuro	6	6
8	(Italy) M Bellucci	4	2
(Portugal) G Oliveira	6	6
(Austria) D Novak	6	6
WC	(Thailand) K Samrej	1	3
Q	(South Korea) S-c Hong	3	7^{7}	6
(Spain) O Roca Batalla	6	6^{5}	3
(United Kingdom) B Harris	6^{3}	1
2	(Germany) B Hassan	7^{7}	6

Second round
LL	(United States) N Moreno de Alboran	6^{10}	7	7^{7}
Q	(United States) T Sandgren	7^{12}	5	6^{2}
Q	(Italy) G Fonio	6	6^{5}	7
3	(Japan) S Shimabukuro	0	7^{7}	5
(Portugal) G Oliveira	4	4
(Austria) D Novak	6	6
Q	(South Korea) S-c Hong	6	6
2	(Germany) B Hassan	2	3

Quarterfinals
LL	(United States) N Moreno de Alboran	4	4
Q	(Italy) G Fonio	6	6
(Austria) D Novak	2	0^{r}
Q	(South Korea) S-c Hong	6	0

Semifinals
Q	(Italy) G Fonio	4	1
Q	(South Korea) S-c Hong	6	6
