= 2022 Nonthaburi Challenger III – Doubles =

Doubles
- 2022 Nonthaburi Challenger III

Final
- Champions: (South Korea) Chung Yun-seong (New Zealand) Ajeet Rai
- Runners-up: (Philippines) Francis Alcantara (Indonesia) Christopher Rungkat
- Score: 6–1, 7–6^{(8–6)}

Events
| Singles | Doubles |
- Nonthaburi Challenger

Benjamin Lock and Yuta Shimizu won the second of the series of three events that comprised the Nonthaburi Challenger, but chose to defend their title with different partners. Lock partnered his brother Courtney but lost in the quarterfinals to Francis Alcantara and Christopher Rungkat. Shimizu partnered Anirudh Chandrasekar but lost in the semifinals to Alcantara and Rungkat.

Chung Yun-seong and Ajeet Rai won the title after defeating Alcantara and Rungkat 6–1, 7–6^{(8–6)} in the final.

== Seeds ==
1. (Zimbabwe) Benjamin Lock / (Zimbabwe) Courtney John Lock (quarterfinals)
2. (Chinese Taipei) Ray Ho / (Kazakhstan) Grigoriy Lomakin (quarterfinals)
3. (Japan) Toshihide Matsui / (Japan) Kaito Uesugi (semifinals)
4. (India) Anirudh Chandrasekar / (Japan) Yuta Shimizu (semifinals)

== Draw ==
Key

- Q = Qualifier
- WC = Wild card
- LL = Lucky loser
- Alt = Alternate
- ITF = ITF entry
- PR = Protected ranking
- SR = Special ranking
- SE = Special exempt
- JE = Junior exempt
- JR = Junior Accelerator Programme entrant
- CO = College Accelerator Programme entrant
- NG = Next Gen Accelerator Program entrant
- w/o = Walkover
- r = Retired
- d = Defaulted

First round
(Philippines) FC Alcantara (Indonesia) C Rungkat | w/o
(France) A Cazaux (France) K Jacquet
4 | (India) A Chandrasekar (Japan) Y Shimizu | 5 | 6 | [10]
(India) A Kalyanpur (India) Sidharth Rawat | 7 | 3 | [5]
(Australia) A Santillan (China) Y Bu | 7^{7} | 2
(Australia) O Jasika (Australia) J McCabe | 6^{5} | 0^{r}
(Japan) Makoto Ochi (Japan) S Watanabe | 6 | 7
(Thailand) Chanchai Sookton-eng (Thailand) W Trongcharoenchaikul | 2 | 5
WC | (Thailand) Thanapet Chanta (Thailand) Congsup Congcar | 6 | 0 | [6]
3 | (Japan) T Matsui (Japan) K Uesugi | 3 | 6 | [10]
(South Korea) Y-s Chung (New Zealand) A Rai | 6 | 6
(Japan) S Hazawa (Japan) Yo Watanuki | 1 | 3
WC | (Thailand) Credit Chaiyarin (Thailand) Noppadol Noikor | 1 | 6^{7}
2 | (Chinese Taipei) R Ho (Kazakhstan) G Lomakin | 6 | 7^{9}

Quarterfinals
1 | (Zimbabwe) B Lock (Zimbabwe) CJ Lock | 6 | 3 | [5]
(Philippines) FC Alcantara (Indonesia) C Rungkat | 4 | 6 | [10]
4 | (India) A Chandrasekar (Japan) Y Shimizu | 6^{4} | 7 | [10]
(Australia) A Santillan (China) Y Bu | 7^{7} | 5 | [5]
(Japan) M Ochi (Japan) S Watanabe | 6 | 6^{3} | [4]
3 | (Japan) T Matsui (Japan) K Uesugi | 4 | 7^{7} | [10]
(South Korea) Y-s Chung (New Zealand) A Rai | 6 | 6
2 | (Chinese Taipei) R Ho (Kazakhstan) G Lomakin | 1 | 4

Semifinals
(Philippines) FC Alcantara (Indonesia) C Rungkat | 6 | 6
4 | (India) A Chandrasekar (Japan) Y Shimizu | 1 | 4
3 | (Japan) T Matsui (Japan) K Uesugi | 4 | 5
(South Korea) Y-s Chung (New Zealand) A Rai | 6 | 7

Final
(Philippines) FC Alcantara (Indonesia) C Rungkat | 1 | 6^{6}
(South Korea) Y-s Chung (New Zealand) A Rai | 6 | 7^{8}
