= 2023 Nonthaburi Challenger =

- Date: 2 – 7 January
- Edition: 4th
- Surface: Hard
- Location: Nonthaburi, Thailand

Champions

Singles
- (Austria) Dennis Novak

Doubles
- (Czech Republic) Marek Gengel / (Czech Republic) Adam Pavlásek
- Nonthaburi Challenger

The 2023 Nonthaburi Challenger was a professional tennis tournament played on hard courts. It was the 4th edition of the tournament which was part of the 2023 ATP Challenger Tour. It took place in Nonthaburi, Thailand from 2 to 7 January 2023.

== Singles main-draw entrants ==
=== Seeds ===
Country	Player	Rank^{1}	Seed
HUN	Fábián Marozsán	173	1
AUT	Dennis Novak	180	2
TPE	Wu Tung-lin	184	3
FRA	Antoine Escoffier	205	4
ITA	Gianluca Mager	212	5
GBR	Paul Jubb	219	6
AUS	Max Purcell	220	7
TPE	Hsu Yu-hsiou	221	8

- ^{1} Rankings are as of 26 December 2022.

=== Other entrants ===
The following players received wildcards into the singles main draw:

- (Thailand) Maximus Jones
- (Thailand) Palaphoom Kovapitukted
- (Thailand) Thantub Suksumrarn

The following players received entry from the qualifying draw:

- (United States) Alafia Ayeni
- Evgeny Donskoy
- (Italy) Giovanni Fonio
- (Australia) Dayne Kelly
- (France) Lucas Pouille
- (Germany) Henri Squire

== Champions ==
=== Singles ===
- (Austria) Dennis Novak def. (Chinese Taipei) Wu Tung-lin 6–4, 6–4.

=== Doubles ===
- (Czech Republic) Marek Gengel / (Czech Republic) Adam Pavlásek def. (United States) Robert Galloway / (Mexico) Hans Hach Verdugo 7–6^{(7–4)}, 6–4.
