= 2024 Nonthaburi Challenger – Singles =

Singles
- 2024 Nonthaburi Challenger

Final
- Champion: (Monaco) Valentin Vacherot
- Runner-up: (France) Lucas Pouille
- Score: 3–2 ret.

Events
Singles	Doubles
- Nonthaburi Challenger

Sho Shimabukuro was the defending champion but chose not to defend his title.

Valentin Vacherot won the title after Lucas Pouille retired trailing 2–3 in the final.

== Seeds ==
1. (Austria) Dennis Novak (first round)
2. (Czech Republic) Zdeněk Kolář (second round)
3. (Italy) Mattia Bellucci (first round, retired)
4. Ivan Gakhov (second round)
5. (Belgium) Kimmer Coppejans (second round)
6. (Kazakhstan) Beibit Zhukayev (withdrew)
7. (Italy) Stefano Travaglia (first round)
8. (Italy) Marco Cecchinato (first round)

== Draw ==
Key

- Q = Qualifier
- WC = Wild card
- LL = Lucky loser
- Alt = Alternate
- ITF = ITF entry
- PR = Protected ranking
- SR = Special ranking
- SE = Special exempt
- JE = Junior exempt
- JR = Junior Accelerator Programme entrant
- CO = College Accelerator Programme entrant
- NG = Next Gen Accelerator Program entrant
- w/o = Walkover
- r = Retired
- d = Defaulted

=== Finals ===
Semifinals
Q	(France) Lucas Pouille	6	6
Q	(South Korea) Hong Seong-chan	3	3
Q	(Monaco) Valentin Vacherot	6	7^{7}
(Chinese Taipei) Hsu Yu-hsiou	3	6^{2}

Final
Q	(France) Lucas Pouille	2^{r}
Q	(Monaco) Valentin Vacherot	3

=== Top half ===
First round
1	(Austria) D Novak	7	4	4
E Donskoy	5	6	6
(Belgium) G Onclin	7	6
(Japan) Y Uchiyama	5	2
Q	(France) L Pouille	6	6
(Portugal) G Oliveira	3	3
WC	(Thailand) M Jones	7	6
8	(Italy) M Cecchinato	5	4
3	(Italy) M Bellucci	6	4	1^{r}
(Estonia) M Lajal	4	6	4
Q	(South Korea) S-c Hong	6	2	6
(France) P-H Herbert	4	6	3
(United States) T Sandgren	5	4
Q	M Sharipov	7	6
(France) L Poullain	6	1	2
5	(Belgium) K Coppejans	3	6	6

Second round
E Donskoy	3	3
(Belgium) G Onclin	6	6
Q	(France) L Pouille	6	6
WC	(Thailand) M Jones	4	0
(Estonia) M Lajal	6	4	5
Q	(South Korea) S-c Hong	2	6	7
Q	M Sharipov	6	6
5	(Belgium) K Coppejans	3	4

Quarterfinals
(Belgium) G Onclin	3	2
Q	(France) L Pouille	6	6
Q	(South Korea) S-c Hong	3	6	6
Q	M Sharipov	6	3	2

Semifinals
Q	(France) L Pouille	6	6
Q	(South Korea) S-c Hong	3	3

=== Bottom half ===
First round
7	(Italy) S Travaglia	3	6	1
(France) L Lokoli	6	3	6
Q	(Japan) R Noguchi	6^{1}	6^{6}
Q	(Monaco) V Vacherot	7^{7}	7^{8}
WC	(Thailand) W Trongcharoenchaikul	3	2
(Italy) F Passaro	6	6
Q	(France) A Weber	4	2
4	I Gakhov	6	6
LL	(Chinese Taipei) C-h Tseng	6	6
(Japan) Y Shimizu	3	3
(Chinese Taipei) Y-h Hsu	6	3	6
(Hungary) M Valkusz	3	6	1
(France) C Tabur	4	3
(United States) B Holt	6	6
WC	(Thailand) K Samrej	7	4	3
2	(Czech Republic) Z Kolář	5	6	6

Second round
(France) L Lokoli	4	4
Q	(Monaco) V Vacherot	6	6
(Italy) F Passaro	7^{12}	6
4	I Gakhov	6^{10}	2
LL	(Chinese Taipei) C-h Tseng	3	0^{r}
(Chinese Taipei) Y-h Hsu	6	1
(United States) B Holt	7^{7}	6
2	(Czech Republic) Z Kolář	6^{4}	2

Quarterfinals
Q	(Monaco) V Vacherot	4	7	7^{7}
(Italy) F Passaro	6	5	6^{1}
(Chinese Taipei) Y-h Hsu	6	6
(United States) B Holt	1	4

Semifinals
Q	(Monaco) V Vacherot	6	7^{7}
(Chinese Taipei) Y-h Hsu	3	6^{2}
