= 2025 Nonthaburi Challenger – Doubles =

Doubles
- 2025 Nonthaburi Challenger

Final
- Champions: (Japan) Kokoro Isomura (Japan) Rio Noguchi
- Runners-up: (Czech Republic) Zdeněk Kolář (Austria) Neil Oberleitner
- Score: 7–6^{(7–3)}, 7–6^{(11–9)}

Events
Singles	Doubles
- Nonthaburi Challenger

Blake Ellis and Adam Walton were the defending champions but chose not to defend their title.

Kokoro Isomura and Rio Noguchi won the title after defeating Zdeněk Kolář and Neil Oberleitner 7–6^{(7–3)}, 7–6^{(11–9)} in the final.

== Seeds ==
1. (Chinese Taipei) Ray Ho / (India) Niki Kaliyanda Poonacha (quarterfinals)
2. (Israel) Daniel Cukierman / (United Kingdom) Joshua Paris (quarterfinals)
3. (Japan) Seita Watanabe / (Japan) Takeru Yuzuki (semifinals)
4. (Thailand) Pruchya Isaro / (China) Wang Aoran (first round)

== Draw ==
Key

- Q = Qualifier
- WC = Wild card
- LL = Lucky loser
- Alt = Alternate
- ITF = ITF entry
- PR = Protected ranking
- SR = Special ranking
- SE = Special exempt
- JE = Junior exempt
- JR = Junior Accelerator Programme entrant
- CO = College Accelerator Programme entrant
- NG = Next Gen Accelerator Program entrant
- w/o = Walkover
- r = Retired
- d = Defaulted

=== Draw ===
First round
1	(Chinese Taipei) R Ho (India) N Kaliyanda Poonacha	6	6
WC	(Thailand) Yuttana Charoenphon (Thailand) K Samrej	0	3
(Venezuela) G Oliveira (Canada) K Stevenson	1	3
(Czech Republic) Z Kolář (Austria) N Oberleitner	6	6
3	(Japan) S Watanabe (Japan) T Yuzuki	7	4	[10]
(Italy) E Dalla Valle (Uzbekistan) K Sultanov	5	6	[5]
(Romania) FC Jianu; M Sharipov	6	4	[10]
(France) C Denolly (Zimbabwe) CJ Lock	3	6	[8]
(Ukraine) O Prihodko (Netherlands) J Sels	2	5
(Japan) H Moriya (Japan) K Uesugi	6	7
(France) G Blancaneaux (France) C Tabur	6	7^{8}
4	(Thailand) P Isaro (China) A Wang	3	6^{6}
Alt	(Japan) K Isomura (Japan) R Noguchi	6	6
(Japan) M Imamura (South Korea) Shin Woo-bin	4	2
WC	(Thailand) M Jones (Thailand) W Trongcharoenchaikul	3	3
2	(Israel) D Cukierman (United Kingdom) J Paris	6	6

Quarterfinals
1	(Chinese Taipei) R Ho (India) N Kaliyanda Poonacha	3	3
(Czech Republic) Z Kolář (Austria) N Oberleitner	6	6
3	(Japan) S Watanabe (Japan) T Yuzuki	w/o
(Romania) FC Jianu; M Sharipov
(Japan) H Moriya (Japan) K Uesugi	6^{3}	6	[10]
(France) G Blancaneaux (France) C Tabur	7^{7}	3	[8]
Alt	(Japan) K Isomura (Japan) R Noguchi	6	6
2	(Israel) D Cukierman (United Kingdom) J Paris	3	4

Semifinals
(Czech Republic) Z Kolář (Austria) N Oberleitner	6	6
3	(Japan) S Watanabe (Japan) T Yuzuki	2	0
(Japan) H Moriya (Japan) K Uesugi	1	6	[10]
Alt	(Japan) K Isomura (Japan) R Noguchi	6	4	[12]

Final
(Czech Republic) Z Kolář (Austria) N Oberleitner	6^{3}	6^{9}
Alt	(Japan) K Isomura (Japan) R Noguchi	7^{7}	7^{11}
