= 2025 Nonthaburi Challenger =

- Date: 30 December – 4 January
- Edition: 11th
- Surface: Hard
- Location: Nonthaburi, Thailand

Champions

Singles
- Aslan Karatsev

Doubles
- (Japan) Kokoro Isomura / (Japan) Rio Noguchi
- Nonthaburi Challenger

The 2025 Nonthaburi Challenger was a professional tennis tournament played on hard courts. It was the 11th edition of the tournament which was part of the 2025 ATP Challenger Tour. It took place in Nonthaburi, Thailand from 30 December 2024 to 4 January 2025.

== Singles main-draw entrants ==
=== Seeds ===
Country	Player	Rank^{1}	Seed
ARG	Marco Trungelliti	143	1
FRA	Grégoire Barrère	162	2
GER	Henri Squire	178	3
FRA	Titouan Droguet	182	4
FRA	Clément Chidekh	189	5
KAZ	Timofey Skatov	191	6
ROU	Filip Cristian Jianu	214	7
LIB	Benjamin Hassan	218	8

- ^{1} Rankings are as of 23 December 2024.

=== Other entrants ===
The following players received wildcards into the singles main draw:

- (Thailand) Thanapet Chanta
- (Thailand) Kasidit Samrej
- (Thailand) Wishaya Trongcharoenchaikul

The following player received entry into the singles main draw as an alternate:

- (United States) Murphy Cassone

The following players received entry from the qualifying draw:

- (Belgium) Kimmer Coppejans
- (Thailand) Maximus Jones
- (Japan) Hiroki Moriya
- (Japan) Rei Sakamoto
- Marat Sharipov
- (France) Clément Tabur

== Champions ==
=== Singles ===
- Aslan Karatsev def. (France) Grégoire Barrère 7–6^{(7–5)}, 7–5.

=== Doubles ===
- (Japan) Kokoro Isomura / (Japan) Rio Noguchi def. (Czech Republic) Zdeněk Kolář / (Austria) Neil Oberleitner 7–6^{(7–3)}, 7–6^{(11–9)}.
