= 2024 Nonthaburi Challenger II =

- Date: 8 – 13 January
- Edition: 8th
- Surface: Hard
- Location: Nonthaburi, Thailand

Champions

Singles
- (Monaco) Valentin Vacherot

Doubles
- (France) Manuel Guinard / (France) Grégoire Jacq
- Nonthaburi Challenger

The 2024 Nonthaburi Challenger II was a professional tennis tournament played on hard courts. It was the 8th edition of the tournament which was part of the 2024 ATP Challenger Tour. It took place in Nonthaburi, Thailand from 8 to 13 January 2024.

== Singles main-draw entrants ==
=== Seeds ===
Country	Player	Rank^{1}	Seed
AUT	Dennis Novak	165	1
TPE	Jason Jung	244	2
FRA	Lucas Poullain	250	3
	Evgeny Donskoy	251	4
HKG	Coleman Wong	253	5
USA	Tennys Sandgren	259	6
GER	Henri Squire	262	7
USA	Brandon Holt	263	8

- ^{1} Rankings are as of 1 January 2024.

=== Other entrants ===
The following players received wildcards into the singles main draw:

- (Thailand) Maximus Jones
- (Thailand) Kasidit Samrej
- (Thailand) Wishaya Trongcharoenchaikul

The following player received entry into the singles main draw as an alternate:

- (Czech Republic) Dominik Palán

The following players received entry from the qualifying draw:

- (Dominican Republic) Nick Hardt
- (United States) Christian Langmo
- (Japan) Hiroki Moriya
- (Japan) Rio Noguchi
- (India) Ramkumar Ramanathan
- (Japan) Yusuke Takahashi

== Champions ==
=== Singles ===
- (Monaco) Valentin Vacherot def. (France) Manuel Guinard 7–5, 7–6^{(7–4)}.

=== Doubles ===
- (France) Manuel Guinard / (France) Grégoire Jacq def. (Philippines) Francis Alcantara / (China) Sun Fajing 6–4, 7–6^{(7–5)}.
