= 2026 Nonthaburi Challenger =

- Date: 5 – 10 January
- Edition: 14th
- Surface: Hard
- Location: Nonthaburi, Thailand

Champions

Singles
- (Japan) Rio Noguchi

Doubles
- (Israel) Daniel Cukierman / (Austria) Joel Schwärzler
- Nonthaburi Challenger

The 2026 Nonthaburi Challenger was a professional tennis tournament played on hard courts. It was the 14th edition of the tournament which was part of the 2026 ATP Challenger Tour. It took place in Nonthaburi, Thailand from 5 to 10 January 2026.

== Singles main-draw entrants ==
=== Seeds ===
Country	Player	Rank^{1}	Seed
CZE	Zdeněk Kolář	178	1
ITA	Lorenzo Giustino	214	2
JPN	Rio Noguchi	229	3
MEX	Rodrigo Pacheco Méndez	231	4
JPN	Kaichi Uchida	252	5
AUT	Joel Schwärzler	256	6
USA	Andres Martin	271	7
CHN	Sun Fajing	276	8

- ^{1} Rankings are as of 29 December 2025.

=== Other entrants ===
The following players received wildcards into the singles main draw:

- (Thailand) Kasidit Samrej
- (Thailand) Pawit Sornlaksup
- (Thailand) Wishaya Trongcharoenchaikul

The following players received entry from the qualifying draw:

- (Belgium) Tibo Colson
- (Japan) Taisei Ichikawa
- (Japan) Koki Matsuda
- (Japan) Hayato Matsuoka
- (Japan) Hiroki Moriya
- (Japan) Hikaru Shiraishi

The following player received entry as a lucky loser:

- (France) Arthur Weber

== Champions ==
=== Singles ===
- (Japan) Rio Noguchi def. (Czech Republic) Marek Gengel 6–3, 6–4.

=== Doubles ===
- (Israel) Daniel Cukierman / (Austria) Joel Schwärzler def. (Chinese Taipei) Hsieh Cheng-peng / (Chinese Taipei) Huang Tsung-hao 6–3, 6–1.
