= Palaphoom Kovapitukted =

Thai tennis player (born 1999)

Palaphoom Kovapitukted พลภูมิ โควาพิทักษ์เทศ
- Country (sports): Thailand
- Born: 5 December 1999 (age 25) Bangkok, Thailand
- Prize money: $4,161

Singles
- Career record: 2–2 (at ATP Tour level, Grand Slam level, and in Davis Cup)
- Career titles: 0
- Highest ranking: No. 603 (28 August 2023)

Doubles
- Career record: 0–2 (at ATP Tour level, Grand Slam level, and in Davis Cup)
- Career titles: 0
- Highest ranking: No. 606 (27 May 2019)
- Last updated on: 30 October 2022.

Palaphoom Kovapitukted (Thai: พลภูมิ โควาพิทักษ์เทศ; born 5 December 1999) is a Thai tennis player.

Kovapitukted has a career high ATP singles ranking of 1305 achieved on 8 October 2018. He also has a career high ATP doubles ranking of 872, which was achieved on 8 October 2018.

Kovapitukted has represented Thailand at the Davis Cup, where he has a win–loss record of 1–3.

== ATP Challenger and ITF World Tennis Tour finals ==
=== Singles: 2 (1–1) ===
Legend ATP Challenger Tour (0–0) ITF World Tennis Tour (1–1)	Finals by surface Hard (1–1) Clay (0–0) Grass (0–0) Carpet (0–0)

Result	W–L	Date	Tournament	Tier	Surface	Opponent	Score
Win	1–0	Oct 2022	M15 Al Zahra, Kuwait	World Tennis Tour	Hard	(Czech Republic) Dominik Palán	6–4, 6–4
Loss	1–1	Jul 2023	M15 Jakarta, Indonesia	World Tennis Tour	Hard	(Indonesia) Muhammad Rifqi Fitriadi	3–6, 4–6
