= Kokoro Isomura =

Japanese tennis player (born 2003)

- Native name: 磯村志
- Country (sports): Japan
- Born: 22 January 2003 (age 23) Hiroshima, Japan
- Height: 1.75 m (5 ft 9 in)
- Plays: Right-handed (two-handed backhand)
- Prize money: US $99,137

Singles
- Career record: 0–0 (at ATP Tour level, Grand Slam level, and in Davis Cup)
- Career titles: 1 ITF
- Highest ranking: No. 424 (8 September 2025)
- Current ranking: No. 635 (14 September 2026)

Doubles
- Career record: 0–0 (at ATP Tour level, Grand Slam level, and in Davis Cup)
- Career titles: 1 Challenger, 1 ITF
- Highest ranking: No. 213 (24 November 2025)
- Current ranking: No. 570 (14 September 2026)
- Last updated on: 17 September 2026.

Kokoro Isomura (born 22 January 2003) is a Japanese tennis player. He has a career high ATP singles ranking of No. 424 achieved on 8 September 2025 and a career high ATP doubles ranking of No. 213 achieved on 24 November 2025.

Isomura has won one ATP Challenger doubles title at the 2025 Nonthaburi Challenger.

== ATP Challenger and ITF World Tennis Tour finals ==
=== Singles: 1 (1–0) ===
Legend ATP Challenger Tour (0–0) ITF World Tennis Tour (1–0)	Finals by surface Hard (1–0) Clay (0–0) Grass (0–0) Carpet (0–0)

Result	W–L	Date	Tournament	Tier	Surface	Partner	Opponents	Score
Win	1–0	Dec 2023	M15 Yanagawa, Japan	World Tennis Tour	Hard	(Japan) Yamato Sueoka	(Japan) Jay Dylan Hara Friend (Japan) Kenta Miyoshi	7–6,(7–4) 7–5
