= Thantub Suksumrarn =

Thai tennis player

- Country (sports): Thailand
- Born: 18 May 2001 (age 25) Lopburi, Thailand
- Height: 1.70 m (5 ft 7 in)
- Plays: Right-handed (two-handed backhand)
- Prize money: US $34,859

Singles
- Career record: 0–0 (at ATP Tour level, Grand Slam level, and in Davis Cup)
- Career titles: 1 ITF
- Highest ranking: No. 923 (4 May 2026)
- Current ranking: No. 1,076 (9 November 2026)

Grand Slam singles results
- Australian Open Junior: 1R (2019)
- Wimbledon Junior: Q1 (2019)

Doubles
- Career record: 2–1 (at ATP Tour level, Grand Slam level, and in Davis Cup)
- Career titles: 2 ITF
- Highest ranking: No. 466 (13 July 2026)
- Current ranking: No. 603 (9 November 2026)

Grand Slam doubles results
- Australian Open Junior: QF (2019)

Team competitions
- Davis Cup: 1–0
Medal record
Men's tennis
Representing Thailand
Southeast Asian Games
Gold medal – first place	2023 Cambodia	Team
- Last updated on: 9 November 2026.

Thantub Suksumrarn (Thai: ฐานทัพ สุขสำราญ, born 18 May 2001) is a Thai tennis player. Suksumrarn has a career high ATP singles ranking of No. 923 achieved on 4 May 2026 and a career high ATP doubles ranking of No. 466 achieved on 13 July 2026.

Suksumrarn has won two ITF doubles titles.

Suksumrarn represents Thailand at the Davis Cup, where he has a W/L record of 1–0.
