= Yuttana Charoenphon =

Thai tennis player (born 2000)

- Country (sports): Thailand
- Born: 14 August 2000 (age 26) Angthong, Thailand
- Height: 1.78 m (5 ft 10 in)
- Plays: Right-handed (two-handed backhand)
- Coach: Paradorn Srichaphan
- Prize money: US $23,403

Singles
- Career record: 3–2 (at ATP Tour level, Grand Slam level, and in Davis Cup)
- Career titles: 0
- Highest ranking: No. 939 (8 August 2022)
- Current ranking: No. 1,476 (19 October 2026)

Doubles
- Career record: 0–0 (at ATP Tour level, Grand Slam level, and in Davis Cup)
- Career titles: 0
- Highest ranking: No. 868 (12 June 2023)
- Current ranking: No. 1,420 (19 October 2026)
Medal record
Men's tennis
Representing Thailand
Southeast Asian Games
Gold medal – first place	2023 Cambodia	Men's Team
- Last updated on: 19 October 2026.

Yuttana Charoenphon (Thai: ยุทธนา เจริญผล; born 14 August 2000) is a Thai tennis player. He has a career high ATP singles ranking of No. 939 achieved on 8 August 2022 and a career high ATP doubles ranking of No. 868 achieved on 12 June 2023.

Charoenphon represents Thailand at the Davis Cup, where he has a W/L record of 1–1.
