= Nonthaburi Challenger =

Tennis tournament in Thailand

- 2026 Nonthaburi Challenger

ATP Challenger Tour
- Location: Lawn Tennis Association of Thailand, Nonthaburi, Thailand
- Category: ATP Challenger Tour
- Surface: Hard
- Website: Website

The Nonthaburi Challenger is a professional tennis tournament played on hard courts. It is currently part of the Association of Tennis Professionals (ATP) Challenger Tour. It has been held in Nonthaburi province, Thailand since 2022.

== Past finals ==
=== Singles ===
Year	Champion	Runner-up	Score
2022 (1)	(Monaco) Valentin Vacherot	(Vietnam) Lý Hoàng Nam	6–3, 7–6^{(7–4)}
2022 (2)	(France) Arthur Cazaux	(Australia) Omar Jasika	7–6^{(8–6)}, 6–4
2022 (3)	(United Kingdom) Stuart Parker	(France) Arthur Cazaux	6–4, 4–1 ret.
2023 (1)	(Austria) Dennis Novak	(Chinese Taipei) Wu Tung-lin	6–4, 6–4
2023 (2)	(France) Arthur Cazaux	(South Africa) Lloyd Harris	7–6^{(7–5)}, 6–2
2023 (3)	(Japan) Sho Shimabukuro	(France) Arthur Cazaux	6–2, 7–5
2024 (1)	(Monaco) Valentin Vacherot	(France) Lucas Pouille	3–2 ret.
2024 (2)	(Monaco) Valentin Vacherot	(France) Manuel Guinard	7–5, 7–6^{(7–4)}
2024 (3)	(Italy) Matteo Gigante	(South Korea) Hong Seong-chan	6–4, 6–1
2024 (4)	(Chinese Taipei) Wu Tung-lin	(United States) Mackenzie McDonald	6–3, 7–6^{(7–4)}
2025 (1)	Aslan Karatsev	(France) Grégoire Barrère	7–6^{(7–5)}, 7–5
2025 (2)	(Japan) Rio Noguchi	(China) Cui Jie	7–6^{(11–9)}, 6–2
2025 (3)	(United States) Brandon Holt	(Czech Republic) Vít Kopřiva	6–3, 6–2
2026 (1)	(Japan) Rio Noguchi	(Czech Republic) Marek Gengel	6–3, 6–4
2026 (2)	(Spain) Pol Martín Tiffon	(Thailand) Maximus Jones	6–4, 3–6, 6–4

=== Doubles ===
Year	Champions	Runners-up	Score
2022 (1)	Evgeny Donskoy; Alibek Kachmazov	(South Korea) Nam Ji-sung (South Korea) Song Min-kyu	6–3, 1–6, [10–7]
2022 (2)	(Zimbabwe) Benjamin Lock (Japan) Yuta Shimizu	(Philippines) Francis Alcantara (Indonesia) Christopher Rungkat	6–1, 6–3
2022 (3)	(South Korea) Chung Yun-seong (New Zealand) Ajeet Rai	(Philippines) Francis Alcantara (Indonesia) Christopher Rungkat	6–1, 7–6^{(8–6)}
2023 (1)	(Czech Republic) Marek Gengel (Czech Republic) Adam Pavlásek	(United States) Robert Galloway (Mexico) Hans Hach Verdugo	7–6^{(7–4)}, 6–4
2023 (2)	(India) Yuki Bhambri (India) Saketh Myneni	(Indonesia) Christopher Rungkat (Australia) Akira Santillan	2–6, 7–6^{(9–7)}, [14–12]
2023 (3)	(South Korea) Nam Ji-sung (South Korea) Song Min-kyu	(United Kingdom) Jan Choinski (United Kingdom) Stuart Parker	6–4, 6–4 6-4, 7-6^{(7-5)}
2024 (1)	(United Kingdom) Arthur Fery (United Kingdom) Joshua Paris	(Thailand) Pruchya Isaro (Thailand) Maximus Jones	6–2, 7–5
2024 (2)	(France) Manuel Guinard (France) Grégoire Jacq	(Philippines) Francis Alcantara (China) Sun Fajing	6–4, 7–6^{(7–5)}
2024 (3)	(United Kingdom) Luke Johnson (Tunisia) Skander Mansouri	(India) Rithvik Choudary Bollipalli (India) Niki Kaliyanda Poonacha	7–5, 6–4
2024 (4)	(Australia) Blake Ellis (Australia) Adam Walton	(India) Rithvik Choudary Bollipalli (India) Arjun Kadhe	3–6, 7–5, [10–8]
2025 (1)	(Japan) Kokoro Isomura (Japan) Rio Noguchi	(Czech Republic) Zdeněk Kolář (Austria) Neil Oberleitner	7–6^{(7–3)}, 7–6^{(11–9)}
2025 (2)	(Chinese Taipei) Ray Ho (Austria) Neil Oberleitner	(Israel) Daniel Cukierman (United Kingdom) Joshua Paris	6–4, 7–6^{(7–5)}
2025 (3)	(Chinese Taipei) Ray Ho (Austria) Neil Oberleitner	(Thailand) Pruchya Isaro (China) Wang Aoran	6–3, 6–4
2026 (1)	(Israel) Daniel Cukierman (Austria) Joel Schwärzler	(Chinese Taipei) Hsieh Cheng-peng (Chinese Taipei) Huang Tsung-hao	6–3, 6–1
2026 (2)	(India) Sriram Balaji (Austria) Neil Oberleitner	(India) Anirudh Chandrasekar (Japan) Takeru Yuzuki	6–3, 7–6^{(8–6)}
