= 2026 Monza Open – Singles =

Singles
- 2026 Monza Open

Final
- Champion: (Belgium) Raphaël Collignon
- Runner-up: (Croatia) Dino Prižmić
- Score: 7–6^{(7–2)}, 6–3

Events
Singles	Doubles
- Monza Open

Raphaël Collignon was the defending champion and successfully defended his title after defeating Dino Prižmić 7–6^{(7–2)}, 6–3 in the final.

== Seeds ==
1. (Belgium) Raphaël Collignon (champion)
2. (France) Valentin Royer (quarterfinals)
3. (Italy) Mattia Bellucci (semifinals)
4. (Spain) Martín Landaluce (semifinals)
5. (Lithuania) Vilius Gaubas (first round)
6. (France) Luca Van Assche (quarterfinals)
7. (Croatia) Dino Prižmić (final)
8. (France) Hugo Gaston (quarterfinals)

== Draw ==
Key

- Q = Qualifier
- WC = Wild card
- LL = Lucky loser
- Alt = Alternate
- ITF = ITF entry
- PR = Protected ranking
- SR = Special ranking
- SE = Special exempt
- JE = Junior exempt
- JR = Junior Accelerator Programme entrant
- CO = College Accelerator Programme entrant
- NG = Next Gen Accelerator Program entrant
- w/o = Walkover
- r = Retired
- d = Defaulted

=== Finals ===
Semifinals
1	(Belgium) Raphaël Collignon	6	6
4/NG	(Spain) Martín Landaluce	1	4
3	(Italy) Mattia Bellucci	6^{1}	4
7	(Croatia) Dino Prižmić	7^{7}	6

Final
1	(Belgium) Raphaël Collignon	7^{7}	6
7	(Croatia) Dino Prižmić	6^{2}	3

=== Top half ===
First round
1	(Belgium) R Collignon	6	6
(Australia) C O'Connell	2	2
(Tunisia) M Echargui	3	4
Alt	(Switzerland) R Bertola	6	6
(Japan) R Sakamoto	6	6
(Spain) R Carballés Baena	4	3
Q	(Poland) M Kaśnikowski	2	4
6	(France) L Van Assche	6	6
4/NG	(Spain) M Landaluce	6	2	6
Q	(Italy) F Arnaboldi	4	6	2
(Italy) M Cecchinato	4	6	7^{7}
Q	(Austria) S Kopp	6	1	6^{4}
Q	(Slovakia) N Gombos	3	1
(Kazakhstan) T Skatov	6	6
WC	(Italy) G Cadenasso	4	4
8	(France) H Gaston	6	6

Second round
1	(Belgium) R Collignon	6	7^{7}
Alt	(Switzerland) R Bertola	2	6^{1}
(Japan) R Sakamoto	3	5
6	(France) L Van Assche	6	7
4/NG	(Spain) M Landaluce	6	6
(Italy) M Cecchinato	4	4
(Kazakhstan) T Skatov	6^{5}	6^{5}
8	(France) H Gaston	7^{7}	7^{7}

Quarterfinals
1	(Belgium) R Collignon	6	6
6	(France) L Van Assche	4	0
4/NG	(Spain) M Landaluce	6	6
8	(France) H Gaston	3	2

Semifinals
1	(Belgium) R Collignon	6	6
4/NG	(Spain) M Landaluce	1	4

=== Bottom half ===
First round
5	(Lithuania) V Gaubas	6^{1}	5
(Italy) S Travaglia	7^{7}	7
Q	(Italy) J Vasamì	5	5
SE	(Italy) R Brancaccio	7	7
(Netherlands) G den Ouden	4	2
Q	(Italy) A Guerrieri	6	6
(Serbia) D Lajović	6^{5}	4
3	(Italy) M Bellucci	7^{7}	6
7	(Croatia) D Prižmić	6	6
WC	(Italy) Pietro Fellin	4	1
SE	(Italy) M Ribecai	4	2
(United Kingdom) B Harris	6	6
(United Kingdom) A Fery	4	6	6
(Ukraine) V Sachko	6	3	3
WC	(Italy) L Nardi	6^{4}	5
2	(France) V Royer	7^{7}	7

Second round
(Italy) S Travaglia	6	6
SE	(Italy) R Brancaccio	2	2
Q	(Italy) A Guerrieri	3	4
3	(Italy) M Bellucci	6	6
7	(Croatia) D Prižmić	6	6
(United Kingdom) B Harris	3	4
(United Kingdom) A Fery	6^{4}	3
2	(France) V Royer	7^{7}	6

Quarterfinals
(Italy) S Travaglia	6^{5}	6^{5}
3	(Italy) M Bellucci	7^{7}	7^{7}
7	(Croatia) D Prižmić	6	6
2	(France) V Royer	3	2

Semifinals
3	(Italy) M Bellucci	6^{1}	4
7	(Croatia) D Prižmić	7^{7}	6
