= 2025 Monza Open – Singles =

Singles
- 2025 Monza Open

Final
- Champion: (Belgium) Raphaël Collignon
- Runner-up: (Ukraine) Vitaliy Sachko
- Score: 6–3, 7–5

Events
Singles	Doubles
Monza Open	· 2026 →

This was the first edition of the tournament.

Raphaël Collignon won the title after defeating Vitaliy Sachko 6–3, 7–5 in the final.

== Seeds ==
1. (Belgium) Raphaël Collignon (champion)
2. (United States) Nishesh Basavareddy (first round)
3. (Brazil) Thiago Seyboth Wild (first round)
4. (Argentina) Federico Coria (second round)
5. (Argentina) Juan Manuel Cerúndolo (second round)
6. (France) Harold Mayot (withdrew)
7. (Spain) Martín Landaluce (second round)
8. (Czech Republic) Dalibor Svrčina (semifinals)
9. (Croatia) Duje Ajduković (first round)

== Draw ==
=== Key ===
- Q = Qualifier
- WC = Wild card
- LL = Lucky loser
- Alt = Alternate
- ITF = ITF entry
- PR = Protected ranking
- SR = Special ranking
- SE = Special exempt
- JE = Junior exempt
- JR = Junior Accelerator Programme entrant
- CO = College Accelerator Programme entrant
- NG = Next Gen Accelerator Program entrant
- w/o = Walkover
- r = Retired
- d = Defaulted

=== Finals ===
Semifinals
1	(Belgium) Raphaël Collignon	6	6
8	(Czech Republic) Dalibor Svrčina	1	1
(France) Luca Van Assche	3	6	4
SE	(Ukraine) Vitaliy Sachko	6	2	6

Final
1	(Belgium) Raphaël Collignon	6	7
SE	(Ukraine) Vitaliy Sachko	3	5

=== Top half ===
First round
1	(Belgium) R Collignon	6	6
WC	(Italy) F Cinà	2	4
(Slovakia) L Klein	1	3
Alt	(Uzbekistan) K Sultanov	6	6
Q	(Bulgaria) D Kuzmanov	6^{5}	4
(France) A Géa	7^{7}	6
(United Kingdom) J Choinski	7^{8}	6
9	(Croatia) D Ajduković	6^{6}	2
4	(Argentina) F Coria	4	6	6
(United Kingdom) D Evans	6	1	2
Q	(India) S Nagal	2	0^{r}
Alt	(Austria) F Misolic	6	1
Q	(Italy) E Dalla Valle	6	6^{5}	6
Q	(Switzerland) M Brunold	2	7^{7}	3
(Moldova) R Albot	5	6	4
8	(Czech Republic) D Svrčina	7	4	6

Second round
1	(Belgium) R Collignon	6	4	6
Alt	(Uzbekistan) K Sultanov	2	6	0
(France) A Géa	6	2	3
(United Kingdom) J Choinski	4	6	6
4	(Argentina) F Coria	0	6	0
Alt	(Austria) F Misolic	6	4	6
Q	(Italy) E Dalla Valle	2	1
8	(Czech Republic) D Svrčina	6	6

Quarterfinals
1	(Belgium) R Collignon	3	6	2
(United Kingdom) J Choinski	6	2	0^{r}
Alt	(Austria) F Misolic	2	6	5
8	(Czech Republic) D Svrčina	6	3	7

Semifinals
1	(Belgium) R Collignon	6	6
8	(Czech Republic) D Svrčina	1	1

=== Bottom half ===
First round
5	(Argentina) JM Cerúndolo	7	6
Alt	(Bolivia) M Dellien	5	1
(Croatia) M Dodig	6^{6}	2
(Italy) F Arnaboldi	7^{8}	6
Q	(Italy) Andrea Picchione	6	6^{3}	4
(France) L Van Assche	3	7^{7}	6
Q	(Croatia) M Poljičak	6	6
3	(Brazil) T Seyboth Wild	3	4
7	(Spain) M Landaluce	6	6
LL	(Switzerland) R Bertola	1	4
(United Kingdom) P Jubb	3	4
WC	(Italy) J Vasamì	6	6
(Italy) M Gigante	3	6	6
WC	(Italy) Pietro Fellin	6	3	2
SE	(Ukraine) V Sachko	3	6	6
2	(United States) N Basavareddy	6	1	4

Second round
5	(Argentina) JM Cerúndolo	2	4
(Italy) F Arnaboldi	6	6
(France) L Van Assche	6	6
Q	(Croatia) M Poljičak	2	4
7	(Spain) M Landaluce	4	4
WC	(Italy) J Vasamì	6	6
(Italy) M Gigante	6	4	2
SE	(Ukraine) V Sachko	3	6	6

Quarterfinals
(Italy) F Arnaboldi	4	6	3
(France) L Van Assche	6	3	6
WC	(Italy) J Vasamì	6	3	4
SE	(Ukraine) V Sachko	3	6	6

Semifinals
(France) L Van Assche	3	6	4
SE	(Ukraine) V Sachko	6	2	6
