= 2025 Internazionali di Tennis Città di Todi – Singles =

Singles
- 2025 Internazionali di Tennis Città di Todi

Final
- Champion: (Kazakhstan) Timofey Skatov
- Runner-up: (Italy) Stefano Travaglia
- Score: 7–6^{(7–4)}, 0–6, 6–2

Events
Singles	Doubles
- Internazionali di Tennis Città di Todi

Carlos Taberner was the defending champion but withdrew before the tournament began.

Timofey Skatov won the title after defeating Stefano Travaglia 7–6^{(7–4)}, 0–6, 6–2 in the final.

== Seeds ==
1. (Spain) Carlos Taberner (withdrew)
2. (Argentina) Federico Coria (withdrew)
3. (Norway) Nicolai Budkov Kjær (quarterfinals)
4. (Austria) Lukas Neumayer (quarterfinals)
5. (Peru) Gonzalo Bueno (first round)
6. (Italy) Stefano Travaglia (final)
7. (Monaco) Valentin Vacherot (semifinals)
8. (Portugal) Frederico Ferreira Silva (first round)
9. (Croatia) Matej Dodig (first round)

== Draw ==
Key

- Q = Qualifier
- WC = Wild card
- LL = Lucky loser
- Alt = Alternate
- ITF = ITF entry
- PR = Protected ranking
- SR = Special ranking
- SE = Special exempt
- JE = Junior exempt
- JR = Junior Accelerator Programme entrant
- CO = College Accelerator Programme entrant
- NG = Next Gen Accelerator Program entrant
- w/o = Walkover
- r = Retired
- d = Defaulted

=== Finals ===
Semifinals
SE	(Kazakhstan) Timofey Skatov	6	6
7	(Monaco) Valentin Vacherot	4	4
6	(Italy) Stefano Travaglia	6	6
(Bolivia) Juan Carlos Prado Ángelo	4	2

Final
SE	(Kazakhstan) Timofey Skatov	7^{7}	0	6
6	(Italy) Stefano Travaglia	6^{4}	6	2

=== Top half ===
First round
9	(Croatia) M Dodig	6	3	3
Q	(Italy) Facundo Juárez	3	6	6
Q	(Italy) G Ferrari	6	3	6
WC	(Italy) Lorenzo Carboni	3	6	1
LL	(Italy) F Romano	6	6
Q	(Italy) Fausto Tabacco	4	2
SE	(Kazakhstan) T Skatov	4	6	6
5	(Peru) G Bueno	6	1	1
3	(Norway) N Budkov Kjær	6	4	7^{7}
(Argentina) JB Torres	2	6	6^{5}
Alt	(Argentina) G Villanueva	2	2
(Brazil) M Pucinelli de Almeida	6	6
PR	(Italy) F Forti	6	6
Q	(Finland) E Vasa	3	3
NG	(Czech Republic) M Mrva	2	1
7	(Monaco) V Vacherot	6	6

Second round
Q	(Italy) F Juárez	4	4
Q	(Italy) G Ferrari	6	6
LL	(Italy) F Romano	6	0	4
SE	(Kazakhstan) T Skatov	3	6	6
3	(Norway) N Budkov Kjær	7^{7}	3
(Brazil) M Pucinelli de Almeida	6^{2}	0^{r}
PR	(Italy) F Forti	4	2
7	(Monaco) V Vacherot	6	6

Quarterfinals
Q	(Italy) G Ferrari	4	7^{7}	2
SE	(Kazakhstan) T Skatov	6	6^{5}	6
3	(Norway) N Budkov Kjær	1	3
7	(Monaco) V Vacherot	6	6

Semifinals
SE	(Kazakhstan) T Skatov	6	6
7	(Monaco) V Vacherot	4	4

=== Bottom half ===
First round
6	(Italy) S Travaglia	4	6	6
(Portugal) T Pereira	6	1	2
WC	(Italy) J Vasamì	7^{7}	6
LL	(Italy) Gabriele Maria Noce	6^{5}	4
(Spain) C Sánchez Jover	6	6^{2}	6
WC	(Italy) Pierluigi Basile	3	7^{7}	4
Q	(Italy) A Guerrieri	1	2
4	(Austria) L Neumayer	6	6
8	(Portugal) F Ferreira Silva	6^{5}	2
A Vatutin	7^{7}	6
(Italy) M Cecchinato	6	6
Alt	(Switzerland) R Bertola	0	3
(Croatia) M Poljičak	5	7^{7}	3
(Bolivia) JC Prado Ángelo	7	6^{2}	6
(Italy) F Arnaboldi	6^{4}	4
Q	(Spain) D Jordà Sanchis	7^{7}	6

Second round
6	(Italy) S Travaglia	6	6
WC	(Italy) J Vasamì	4	3
(Spain) C Sánchez Jover	4	5
4	(Austria) L Neumayer	6	7
A Vatutin	4	6	2
(Italy) M Cecchinato	6	3	6
(Bolivia) JC Prado Ángelo	7^{7}	4	6
Q	(Spain) D Jordà Sanchis	6^{1}	6	3

Quarterfinals
6	(Italy) S Travaglia	6	6
4	(Austria) L Neumayer	4	3
(Italy) M Cecchinato	2	2
(Bolivia) JC Prado Ángelo	6	6

Semifinals
6	(Italy) S Travaglia	6	6
(Bolivia) JC Prado Ángelo	4	2
