= 2026 Garden Open – Singles =

Singles
- 2026 Garden Open

Final
- Champion: (Italy) Andrea Guerrieri
- Runner-up: (Czech Republic) Dalibor Svrčina
- Score: 6–4, 2–6, 6–1

Events
Singles	Doubles
- Garden Open

Matteo Gigante was the defending champion but chose not to defend his title.

Andrea Guerrieri won the title after defeating Dalibor Svrčina 6–4, 2–6, 6–1 in the final.

== Seeds ==
1. (Czech Republic) Dalibor Svrčina (final)
2. (Chinese Taipei) Tseng Chun-hsin (first round)
3. (United Kingdom) Arthur Fery (second round)
4. (Argentina) Alex Barrena (first round)
5. (Netherlands) Guy den Ouden (first round)
6. (Switzerland) Rémy Bertola (first round)
7. (Greece) Stefanos Sakellaridis (quarterfinals)
8. (Serbia) Laslo Djere (second round)

== Draw ==
Key

- Q = Qualifier
- WC = Wild card
- LL = Lucky loser
- Alt = Alternate
- ITF = ITF entry
- PR = Protected ranking
- SR = Special ranking
- SE = Special exempt
- JE = Junior exempt
- JR = Junior Accelerator Programme entrant
- CO = College Accelerator Programme entrant
- NG = Next Gen Accelerator Program entrant
- w/o = Walkover
- r = Retired
- d = Defaulted

=== Finals ===
Semifinals
1	(Czech Republic) Dalibor Svrčina	6	7^{7}
Q	(Italy) Jacopo Vasamì	3	6^{2}
Q	(Italy) Andrea Guerrieri	6	7
Alt	(Spain) Pol Martín Tiffon	3	5

Final
1	(Czech Republic) Dalibor Svrčina	4	6	1
Q	(Italy) Andrea Guerrieri	6	2	6

=== Top half ===
First round
1	(Czech Republic) D Svrčina	6	6
JR	(Bulgaria) A Vasilev	1	3
JR	(Switzerland) H Bernet	6	6
(France) L Pavlovic	3	4
(Germany) M Topo	2	0
Q	(Romania) C Crețu	6	6
(France) P-H Herbert	6	6^{3}	6
5	(Netherlands) G den Ouden	3	7^{7}	3
4	(Argentina) A Barrena	6	1	2
(Italy) G Cadenasso	2	6	6
Q	(Italy) J Vasamì	4	6	6
(Portugal) F Ferreira Silva	6	3	2
WC	(Italy) E Dalla Valle	0	3
Alt	(Spain) N Sánchez Izquierdo	6	6
(Germany) H Squire	6^{3}	6	4
7	(Greece) S Sakellaridis	7^{7}	4	6

Second round
1	(Czech Republic) D Svrčina	6	6
JR	(Switzerland) H Bernet	4	4
Q	(Romania) C Crețu	6	6
(France) P-H Herbert	3	2
(Italy) G Cadenasso	4	2
Q	(Italy) J Vasamì	6	6
Alt	(Spain) N Sánchez Izquierdo	6^{6}	6^{3}
7	(Greece) S Sakellaridis	7^{8}	7^{7}

Quarterfinals
1	(Czech Republic) D Svrčina	6	6
Q	(Romania) C Crețu	3	1
Q	(Italy) J Vasamì	6	6
7	(Greece) S Sakellaridis	4	3

Semifinals
1	(Czech Republic) D Svrčina	6	7^{7}
Q	(Italy) J Vasamì	3	6^{2}

=== Bottom half ===
First round
6	(Switzerland) R Bertola	4	2
(Romania) FC Jianu	6	6
(Belgium) K Coppejans	1	0
Q	(Italy) F Romano	6	6
WC	(Italy) F Bondioli	6^{4}	2
Q	(Italy) A Guerrieri	7^{7}	6
(France) D Added	6^{6}	6	4
3	(United Kingdom) A Fery	7^{8}	4	6
8	(Serbia) L Djere	6	7^{7}
Q	(Italy) CA Caniato	4	6^{4}
WC	(Italy) A Vavassori	7^{7}	6^{4}	6
NG	(Czech Republic) M Mrva	6^{4}	7^{7}	3
Alt	(Spain) P Martín Tiffon	6	0	6
Q	(Czech Republic) J Forejtek	4	6	4
(Bosnia and Herzegovina) N Fatić	6	6
2	(Chinese Taipei) C-h Tseng	3	4

Second round
(Romania) FC Jianu	6	6
Q	(Italy) F Romano	3	2
Q	(Italy) A Guerrieri	6	6
3	(United Kingdom) A Fery	4	3
8	(Serbia) L Djere	3	4
WC	(Italy) A Vavassori	6	6
Alt	(Spain) P Martín Tiffon	6	6
(Bosnia and Herzegovina) N Fatić	4	2

Quarterfinals
(Romania) FC Jianu	1	4
Q	(Italy) A Guerrieri	6	6
WC	(Italy) A Vavassori	7^{7}	3	3
Alt	(Spain) P Martín Tiffon	6^{4}	6	6

Semifinals
Q	(Italy) A Guerrieri	6	7
Alt	(Spain) P Martín Tiffon	3	5
