= 2025 Monza Open – Doubles =

Doubles
- 2025 Monza Open

Final
- Champions: (Netherlands) Sander Arends (United Kingdom) Luke Johnson
- Runners-up: (Italy) Filippo Romano (Italy) Jacopo Vasamì
- Score: 6–1, 6–1

Events
Singles	Doubles
Monza Open	· 2026 →

This was the first edition of the tournament.

Sander Arends and Luke Johnson won the title after defeating Filippo Romano and Jacopo Vasamì 6–1, 6–1 in the final.

== Seeds ==
1. (Austria) Alexander Erler / (Germany) Constantin Frantzen (quarterfinals)
2. (Netherlands) Sander Arends / (United Kingdom) Luke Johnson (champions)
3. (Germany) Jakob Schnaitter / (Germany) Mark Wallner (quarterfinals)
4. (Brazil) Marcelo Demoliner / (Netherlands) Matwé Middelkoop (quarterfinals)

== Draw ==
=== Key ===
- Q = Qualifier
- WC = Wild card
- LL = Lucky loser
- Alt = Alternate
- ITF = ITF entry
- PR = Protected ranking
- SR = Special ranking
- SE = Special exempt
- JE = Junior exempt
- JR = Junior Accelerator Programme entrant
- CO = College Accelerator Programme entrant
- NG = Next Gen Accelerator Program entrant
- w/o = Walkover
- r = Retired
- d = Defaulted

=== Draw ===
First round
1	(Austria) A Erler (Germany) C Frantzen	6	6
Alt	(Bulgaria) R Shandarov (Bulgaria) V Shandarov	3	1
(Finland) P Niklas-Salminen (Austria) D Pichler	3	3
WC	(Italy) F Romano (Italy) J Vasamì	6	6
4	(Brazil) M Demoliner (Netherlands) M Middelkoop	6	7^{7}
(Canada) K Stevenson (Italy) Augusto Virgili	2	6^{2}
(Italy) F Maestrelli (Czech Republic) D Svrčina	6	6
Alt	(United Kingdom) Liam Hignett (United Kingdom) J MacKinlay	2	4
(Czech Republic) M Vocel (Poland) S Walków	6	3	[10]
(India) J Nedunchezhiyan (India) VS Prashanth	3	6	[7]
(Romania) A Jecan (Uzbekistan) K Sultanov	4	4
3	(Germany) J Schnaitter (Germany) M Wallner	6	6
WC	(Italy) Pietro Fellin (Italy) William Mirarchi	3	1
(Peru) A Merino (Germany) C Negritu	6	6
(Italy) M Bortolotti (Romania) V Cornea	2	3
2	(Netherlands) S Arends (United Kingdom) L Johnson	6	6

Quarterfinals
1	(Austria) A Erler (Germany) C Frantzen	2	3
WC	(Italy) F Romano (Italy) J Vasamì	6	6
4	(Brazil) M Demoliner (Netherlands) M Middelkoop	6	2	[9]
(Italy) F Maestrelli (Czech Republic) D Svrčina	4	6	[11]
(Czech Republic) M Vocel (Poland) S Walków	7^{7}	6^{4}	[10]
3	(Germany) J Schnaitter (Germany) M Wallner	6^{5}	7^{7}	[5]
(Peru) A Merino (Germany) C Negritu	3	2
2	(Netherlands) S Arends (United Kingdom) L Johnson	6	6

Semifinals
WC	(Italy) F Romano (Italy) J Vasamì	6	6
(Italy) F Maestrelli (Czech Republic) D Svrčina	2	1
(Czech Republic) M Vocel (Poland) S Walków	6	4	[6]
2	(Netherlands) S Arends (United Kingdom) L Johnson	2	6	[10]

Final
WC	(Italy) F Romano (Italy) J Vasamì	1	1
2	(Netherlands) S Arends (United Kingdom) L Johnson	6	6
