= 2025 Internazionali di Tennis Città di Todi =

- Date: 11–16 August
- Edition: 19th
- Surface: Clay
- Location: Todi, Italy

Champions

Singles
- (Kazakhstan) Timofey Skatov

Doubles
- (Italy) Filippo Romano / (Italy) Jacopo Vasamì
- Internazionali di Tennis Città di Todi

The 2025 Internazionali di Tennis Città di Todi was a professional tennis tournament played on clay courts. It was the 19th edition of the tournament which was part of the 2025 ATP Challenger Tour. It took place in Todi, Italy between 11 and 16 August 2025.

== Singles main-draw entrants ==
=== Seeds ===
Country	Player	Rank^{1}	Seed
~~ESP~~	~~Carlos Taberner~~	~~83~~	~~1~~
~~ARG~~	~~Federico Coria~~	~~153~~	~~2~~
NOR	Nicolai Budkov Kjær	163	3
AUT	Lukas Neumayer	170	4
PER	Gonzalo Bueno	220	5
ITA	Stefano Travaglia	233	6
MON	Valentin Vacherot	246	7
POR	Frederico Ferreira Silva	258	8
CRO	Matej Dodig	259	9

- ^{1} Rankings are as of 4 August 2025.

=== Other entrants ===
The following players received wildcards into the singles main draw:

- (Italy) Pierluigi Basile
- (Italy) Lorenzo Carboni
- (Italy) Jacopo Vasamì

The following player received entry into the singles main draw using a protected ranking:

- (Italy) Francesco Forti

The following player received entry into the singles main draw as a special exempt:

- (Kazakhstan) Timofey Skatov

The following player received entry into the singles main draw through the Junior Accelerator programme:

- (Czech Republic) ~~Jan Kumstát~~

The following player received entry into the singles main draw through the Next Gen Accelerator programme:

- (Czech Republic) Maxim Mrva

The following players received entry into the singles main draw as alternates:

- (Switzerland) Rémy Bertola
- (Argentina) Gonzalo Villanueva

The following players received entry from the qualifying draw:

- (Italy) Gianmarco Ferrari
- (Italy) Andrea Guerrieri
- (Spain) David Jordà Sanchis
- (Italy) Facundo Juárez
- (Italy) Fausto Tabacco
- (Finland) Eero Vasa

The following players received entry as lucky losers:

- (Italy) Gabriele Maria Noce
- (Italy) Filippo Romano

== Champions ==
=== Singles ===
- (Kazakhstan) Timofey Skatov def. (Italy) Stefano Travaglia 7–6^{(7–4)}, 0–6, 6–2.

=== Doubles ===
- (Italy) Filippo Romano / (Italy) Jacopo Vasamì def. (Israel) Daniel Cukierman / (Denmark) Johannes Ingildsen 6–4, 6–3.
