= 2026 Monza Open – Doubles =

Doubles
- 2026 Monza Open

Final
- Champions: (Belgium) Sander Gillé (Netherlands) Sem Verbeek
- Runners-up: (Switzerland) Jakub Paul (Czech Republic) Matěj Vocel
- Score: 4–6, 7–6^{(7–3)}, [10–8]

Events
| Singles | Doubles |
- Monza Open

Sander Arends and Luke Johnson were the defending champions but chose not to defend their title.

Sander Gillé and Sem Verbeek won the title after defeating Jakub Paul and Matěj Vocel 4–6, 7–6^{(7–3)}, [10–8] in the final.

== Seeds ==
1. (Germany) Jakob Schnaitter / (Germany) Mark Wallner (first round)
2. (United States) Vasil Kirkov / (Netherlands) Bart Stevens (first round)
3. (Belgium) Sander Gillé / (Netherlands) Sem Verbeek (champions)
4. (Chinese Taipei) Ray Ho / (Germany) Hendrik Jebens (quarterfinals)

== Draw ==
Key

- Q = Qualifier
- WC = Wild card
- LL = Lucky loser
- Alt = Alternate
- ITF = ITF entry
- PR = Protected ranking
- SR = Special ranking
- SE = Special exempt
- JE = Junior exempt
- JR = Junior Accelerator Programme entrant
- CO = College Accelerator Programme entrant
- NG = Next Gen Accelerator Program entrant
- w/o = Walkover
- r = Retired
- d = Defaulted

First round
1 | (Germany) J Schnaitter (Germany) M Wallner | 3 | 6^{6}
(New Zealand) F Reynolds (New Zealand) J Watt | 6 | 7^{8}
(Poland) K Drzewiecki (Czech Republic) P Nouza | 6 | 6
(Italy) G Cadenasso (Italy) S Travaglia | 2 | 2
4 | (Chinese Taipei) R Ho (Germany) H Jebens | 6 | 6
WC | (Italy) F Bondioli (Italy) CA Caniato | 4 | 3
(Switzerland) J Paul (Czech Republic) M Vocel | 6 | 7^{7}
WC | (Italy) F Romano (Italy) J Vasamì | 4 | 6^{3}
(Ecuador) G Escobar (Croatia) N Serdarušić | 5 | 7^{7} | [13]
(Colombia) N Barrientos (Uruguay) A Behar | 7 | 6^{4} | [15]
(India) S Balaji (Austria) N Oberleitner | 6^{3} | 6 | [6]
3 | (Belgium) S Gillé (Netherlands) S Verbeek | 7^{7} | 2 | [10]
I Liutarevich (Poland) F Pieczonka | 6 | 3 | [10]
(France) A Reymond (France) L Sanchez | 2 | 6 | [2]
(Czech Republic) F Duda (Serbia) S Latinović | 6 | 3 | [10]
2 | (United States) V Kirkov (Netherlands) B Stevens | 4 | 6 | [8]

Quarterfinals
(New Zealand) F Reynolds (New Zealand) J Watt | 4 | 6 | [14]
(Poland) K Drzewiecki (Czech Republic) P Nouza | 6 | 3 | [12]
4 | (Chinese Taipei) R Ho (Germany) H Jebens | 4 | 6 | [7]
(Switzerland) J Paul (Czech Republic) M Vocel | 6 | 3 | [10]
(Colombia) N Barrientos (Uruguay) A Behar | 4 | 2
3 | (Belgium) S Gillé (Netherlands) S Verbeek | 6 | 6
I Liutarevich (Poland) F Pieczonka | 4 | 6 | [15]
(Czech Republic) F Duda (Serbia) S Latinović | 6 | 3 | [13]

Semifinals
(New Zealand) F Reynolds (New Zealand) J Watt | 5 | 2
(Switzerland) J Paul (Czech Republic) M Vocel | 7 | 6
3 | (Belgium) S Gillé (Netherlands) S Verbeek | 6 | 7
I Liutarevich (Poland) F Pieczonka | 2 | 5

Final
(Switzerland) J Paul (Czech Republic) M Vocel | 6 | 6^{3} | [8]
3 | (Belgium) S Gillé (Netherlands) S Verbeek | 4 | 7^{7} | [10]
