= 2026 Internazionali di Tennis Città di Vicenza – Singles =

Singles
- 2026 Internazionali di Tennis Città di Vicenza

Final
- Champion: (Austria) Lukas Neumayer
- Runner-up: (Italy) Jacopo Vasamì
- Score: 6–2, 6–2

Events
Singles	Doubles
- Internazionali di Tennis Città di Vicenza

Tseng Chun-hsin was the defending champion but lost in the semifinals to Lukas Neumayer.

Neumayer won the title after defeating Jacopo Vasamì 6–2, 6–2 in the final.

== Seeds ==
1. (Italy) Stefano Travaglia (semifinals)
2. (Tunisia) Moez Echargui (first round)
3. (Austria) Joel Schwärzler (second round)
4. (Italy) Marco Cecchinato (first round)
5. (Chinese Taipei) Tseng Chun-hsin (semifinals)
6. (Peru) Gonzalo Bueno (first round)
7. (Austria) Lukas Neumayer (champion)
8. (Switzerland) Jérôme Kym (first round)

== Draw ==
Key

- Q = Qualifier
- WC = Wild card
- LL = Lucky loser
- Alt = Alternate
- ITF = ITF entry
- PR = Protected ranking
- SR = Special ranking
- SE = Special exempt
- JE = Junior exempt
- JR = Junior Accelerator Programme entrant
- CO = College Accelerator Programme entrant
- NG = Next Gen Accelerator Program entrant
- w/o = Walkover
- r = Retired
- d = Defaulted

=== Finals ===
Semifinals
1	(Italy) Stefano Travaglia	5	6^{5}
WC	(Italy) Jacopo Vasamì	7	7^{7}
5	(Chinese Taipei) Tseng Chun-hsin	7	2	6^{4}
7	(Austria) Lukas Neumayer	5	6	7^{7}

Final
WC	(Italy) Jacopo Vasamì	2	2
7	(Austria) Lukas Neumayer	6	6

=== Top half ===
First round
1	(Italy) S Travaglia	6	6
(Spain) A Moro Cañas	3	3
WC	(Italy) Luca Castagnola	3	2
(Germany) H Squire	6	6
Alt	(Germany) D Dedura	6	5	6
(Italy) R Brancaccio	0	7	2
Q	(Italy) S Pieri	6	7^{7}
8	(Switzerland) J Kym	1	6^{3}
4	(Italy) M Cecchinato	4	6^{3}
(Chinese Taipei) Y-h Hsu	6	7^{7}
Q	(Switzerland) M Brunold	7^{12}	7^{7}
WC	(Italy) Massimo Giunta	6^{10}	6^{4}
WC	(Italy) J Vasamì	6	7^{7}
Q	(Italy) Giorgio Tabacco	1	6^{4}
Q	(Italy) Tommaso Compagnucci	7^{7}	6
6	(Peru) G Bueno	6^{2}	3

Second round
1	(Italy) S Travaglia	6	6
(Germany) H Squire	4	2
Alt	(Germany) D Dedura	6	6
Q	(Italy) S Pieri	2	3
(Chinese Taipei) Y-h Hsu	6	3	6
Q	(Switzerland) M Brunold	2	6	2
WC	(Italy) J Vasamì	2	6	6
Q	(Italy) T Compagnucci	6	4	2

Quarterfinals
1	(Italy) S Travaglia	6	6
Alt	(Germany) D Dedura	2	3
(Chinese Taipei) Y-h Hsu	2	3
WC	(Italy) J Vasamì	6	6

Semifinals
1	(Italy) S Travaglia	5	6^{5}
WC	(Italy) J Vasamì	7	7^{7}

=== Bottom half ===
First round
5	(Chinese Taipei) C-h Tseng	6	6
(Brazil) P Boscardin Dias	1	4
(Argentina) L Midón	7^{7}	6
(Brazil) JL Reis da Silva	6^{4}	1
Q	(Italy) Pietro Fellin	4	4
(Spain) P Martín Tiffon	6	6
Q	(Italy) E Dalla Valle	3	6	3
3	(Austria) J Schwärzler	6	3	6
7	(Austria) L Neumayer	7^{8}	6
Alt	(Australia) L Tu	6^{6}	4
(United States) T Boyer	6^{7}	6	6
(Spain) M Damas	7^{9}	3	4
NG	(India) M Dhamne	4	7	6
(Portugal) F Ferreira Silva	6	5	3
(Switzerland) R Bertola	6	3	6
2	(Tunisia) M Echargui	2	6	3

Second round
5	(Chinese Taipei) C-h Tseng	7	6
(Argentina) L Midón	5	3
(Spain) P Martín Tiffon	6	2	7^{7}
3	(Austria) J Schwärzler	1	6	6^{2}
7	(Austria) L Neumayer	6	6
(United States) T Boyer	2	3
NG	(India) M Dhamne	3	4
(Switzerland) R Bertola	6	6

Quarterfinals
5	(Chinese Taipei) C-h Tseng	2	6	7^{7}
(Spain) P Martín Tiffon	6	2	6^{5}
7	(Austria) L Neumayer	6	7^{7}
(Switzerland) R Bertola	4	6^{3}

Semifinals
5	(Chinese Taipei) C-h Tseng	7	2	6^{4}
7	(Austria) L Neumayer	5	6	7^{7}
