= 2026 Garden Open =

- Date: 20 – 26 April
- Edition: 18th
- Surface: Clay
- Location: Rome, Italy

Champions

Singles
- (Italy) Andrea Guerrieri

Doubles
- (Colombia) Nicolás Barrientos / (Uruguay) Ariel Behar
- Garden Open

The 2026 Roma Garden Open was a professional tennis tournament played on clay courts. It was the 18th edition of the tournament which was part of the 2026 ATP Challenger Tour. It took place in Rome, Italy between 20 and 26 April 2026.

== Singles main-draw entrants ==
=== Seeds ===
Country	Player	Rank^{1}	Seed
CZE	Dalibor Svrčina	128	1
TPE	Tseng Chun-hsin	159	2
GBR	Arthur Fery	162	3
ARG	Alex Barrena	168	4
NED	Guy den Ouden	181	5
SUI	Rémy Bertola	199	6
GRE	Stefanos Sakellaridis	212	7
SRB	Laslo Djere	214	8

- ^{1} Rankings as of 13 April 2026.

=== Other entrants ===
The following players received wildcards into the singles main draw:

- (Italy) Federico Bondioli
- (Italy) Enrico Dalla Valle
- (Italy) Andrea Vavassori

The following players received entry into the singles main draw through the Junior Accelerator programme:

- (Switzerland) Henry Bernet
- (Bulgaria) Alexander Vasilev

The following player received entry into the singles main draw through the Next Gen Accelerator programme:

- (Czech Republic) Maxim Mrva

The following players received entry into the singles main draw as alternates:

- (Spain) Pol Martín Tiffon
- (Spain) Nikolás Sánchez Izquierdo

The following players received entry from the qualifying draw:

- (Italy) Carlo Alberto Caniato
- (Romania) Cezar Crețu
- (Czech Republic) Jonáš Forejtek
- (Italy) Andrea Guerrieri
- (Italy) Filippo Romano
- (Italy) Jacopo Vasamì

== Champions ==
=== Singles ===
- (Italy) Andrea Guerrieri def. (Czech Republic) Dalibor Svrčina 6–4, 2–6, 6–1.

=== Doubles ===
- (Colombia) Nicolás Barrientos / (Uruguay) Ariel Behar def. (Slovakia) Miloš Karol / (Czech Republic) Andrew Paulson 7–6^{(7–4)}, 4–6, [10–7].
