= 2025 Monza Open =

- Date: 7–13 April
- Edition: 1st
- Surface: Clay
- Location: Monza, Italy

Champions

Singles
- (Belgium) Raphaël Collignon

Doubles
- (Netherlands) Sander Arends / (United Kingdom) Luke Johnson
- Monza Open

The 2025 Atkinsons Monza Open was a professional tennis tournament played on clay courts. It was the first edition of the tournament which was part of the 2025 ATP Challenger Tour. It took place in Monza, Italy between 7 and 13 April 2025.

== Singles main-draw entrants ==
=== Seeds ===
Country	Player	Rank^{1}	Seed
BEL	Raphaël Collignon	92	1
USA	Nishesh Basavareddy	108	2
BRA	Thiago Seyboth Wild	113	3
ARG	Federico Coria	126	4
ARG	Juan Manuel Cerúndolo	128	5
~~FRA~~	~~Harold Mayot~~	~~136~~	~~6~~
ESP	Martín Landaluce	153	7
CZE	Dalibor Svrčina	154	8
CRO	Duje Ajduković	166	9

- ^{1} Rankings are as of 31 March 2025.

=== Other entrants ===
The following players received wildcards into the singles main draw:

- (Italy) Federico Cinà
- (Italy) Pietro Fellin
- (Italy) Jacopo Vasamì

The following player received entry into the singles main draw as a special exempt:

- (Ukraine) Vitaliy Sachko

The following players received entry into the singles main draw as alternates:

- (Bolivia) Murkel Dellien
- (Austria) Filip Misolic
- (Uzbekistan) Khumoyun Sultanov

The following players received entry from the qualifying draw:

- (Switzerland) Mika Brunold
- (Italy) Enrico Dalla Valle
- (Bulgaria) Dimitar Kuzmanov
- (India) Sumit Nagal
- (Italy) Andrea Picchione
- (Croatia) Mili Poljičak

The following player received entry as a lucky loser:

- (Switzerland) Rémy Bertola

== Champions ==
=== Singles ===
- (Belgium) Raphaël Collignon def. (Ukraine) Vitaliy Sachko 6–3, 7–5.

=== Doubles ===
- (Netherlands) Sander Arends / (United Kingdom) Luke Johnson def. (Italy) Filippo Romano / (Italy) Jacopo Vasamì 6–1, 6–1.
