= 2026 Monza Open =

- Date: 6–12 April
- Edition: 2nd
- Surface: Clay
- Location: Monza, Italy

Champions

Singles
- (Belgium) Raphaël Collignon

Doubles
- (Belgium) Sander Gillé / (Netherlands) Sem Verbeek
- Monza Open

The 2026 Atkinsons Monza Open was a professional tennis tournament played on clay courts. It was the second edition of the tournament which was part of the 2026 ATP Challenger Tour. It took place in Monza, Italy between 6 and 12 April 2026.

== Singles main-draw entrants ==
=== Seeds ===
Country	Player	Rank^{1}	Seed
BEL	Raphaël Collignon	65	1
FRA	Valentin Royer	71	2
ITA	Mattia Bellucci	73	3
ESP	Martín Landaluce	106	4
LTU	Vilius Gaubas	108	5
FRA	Luca Van Assche	109	6
CRO	Dino Prižmić	112	7
FRA	Hugo Gaston	116	8

- ^{1} Rankings are as of 30 March 2026.

=== Other entrants ===
The following players received wildcards into the singles main draw:

- (Italy) Gianluca Cadenasso
- (Italy) Pietro Fellin
- (Italy) Luca Nardi

The following players received entry into the singles main draw as special exempts:

- (Italy) Raúl Brancaccio
- (Italy) Michele Ribecai

The following player received entry into the singles main draw through the Next Gen Accelerator programme:

- (Spain) Martín Landaluce

The following player received entry into the singles main draw as an alternate:

- (Switzerland) Rémy Bertola

The following players received entry from the qualifying draw:

- (Italy) Federico Arnaboldi
- (Slovakia) Norbert Gombos
- (Italy) Andrea Guerrieri
- (Poland) Maks Kaśnikowski
- (Austria) Sandro Kopp
- (Italy) Jacopo Vasamì

== Champions ==
=== Singles ===
- (Belgium) Raphaël Collignon def. (Croatia) Dino Prižmić 7–6^{(7–2)}, 6–3.

=== Doubles ===
- (Belgium) Sander Gillé / (Netherlands) Sem Verbeek def. (Switzerland) Jakub Paul / (Czech Republic) Matěj Vocel 4–6, 7–6^{(7–3)}, [10–8].
