= 2024 Tennis Challenger Hamburg – Singles =

Singles
- 2024 Tennis Challenger Hamburg

Final
- Champion: (Germany) Henri Squire
- Runner-up: (France) Clément Chidekh
- Score: 6–4, 6–2

Events
Singles	Doubles
← 2023 ·	Tennis Challenger Hamburg	· 2025 →

Illya Marchenko was the defending champion but lost in the first round to Ergi Kırkın.

Henri Squire won the title after defeating Clément Chidekh 6–4, 6–2 in the final.

== Seeds ==
1. (United Kingdom) Jan Choinski (first round)
2. (Japan) Sho Shimabukuro (first round)
3. (China) Bu Yunchaokete (second round)
4. (United Kingdom) Billy Harris (first round)
5. (Italy) Mattia Bellucci (quarterfinals)
6. (Germany) Rudolf Molleker (quarterfinals, retired)
7. (Switzerland) Alexander Ritschard (quarterfinals)
8. (Switzerland) Marc-Andrea Hüsler (second round)

== Draw ==
=== Key ===
- Q = Qualifier
- WC = Wild card
- LL = Lucky loser
- Alt = Alternate
- ITF = ITF entry
- PR = Protected ranking
- SR = Special ranking
- SE = Special exempt
- JE = Junior exempt
- JR = Junior Accelerator Programme entrant
- CO = College Accelerator Programme entrant
- NG = Next Gen Accelerator Program entrant
- w/o = Walkover
- r = Retired
- d = Defaulted

=== Finals ===
Semifinals
(Germany) Henri Squire	6	7
(Belgium) Alexander Blockx	3	5
Q	(France) Clément Chidekh	6	7^{8}
(Japan) Yuta Shimizu	3	6^{6}

Final
(Germany) Henri Squire	6	6
Q	(France) Clément Chidekh	4	2

=== Top half ===
First round
1	(United Kingdom) J Choinski	4	6^{5}
(Japan) Y Uchiyama	6	7^{7}
(Germany) H Squire	6	6
(Canada) S Diez	2	4
LL	(Kazakhstan) D Yevseyev	5	7^{7}	2
(Lithuania) R Berankis	7	6^{5}	6
WC	(Germany) MH Rehberg	2	6^{4}
6	(Germany) R Molleker	6	7^{7}
3	(China) Y Bu	6	6
(Germany) S Fanselow	1	3
(Poland) M Kaśnikowski	4	6^{4}
(Belgium) A Blockx	6	7^{7}
Q	(Switzerland) R Bertola	4	3
Q	(Switzerland) J Paul	6	6
Q	(France) K de Schepper	6	1	3
7	(Switzerland) A Ritschard	3	6	6

Second round
(Japan) Y Uchiyama	4	2
(Germany) H Squire	6	6
(Lithuania) R Berankis	4	6	5
6	(Germany) R Molleker	6	2	7
3	(China) Y Bu	6	2	1
(Belgium) A Blockx	3	6	6
Q	(Switzerland) J Paul	6	6^{6}	2
7	(Switzerland) A Ritschard	3	7^{8}	6

Quarterfinals
(Germany) H Squire	5
6	(Germany) R Molleker	3^{r}
(Belgium) A Blockx	7	6
7	(Switzerland) A Ritschard	5	2

Semifinals
(Germany) H Squire	6	7
(Belgium) A Blockx	3	5

=== Bottom half ===
First round
8	(Switzerland) M-A Hüsler	6	6
(France) A Escoffier	3	1
(Turkey) C İlkel	0	2
Q	(Republic of Ireland) M Agwi	6	6
(Bulgaria) A Andreev	2	7^{8}	3
Q	(France) C Chidekh	6	6^{6}	6
WC	(Germany) N Kuhn	6	7^{7}
4	(United Kingdom) B Harris	4	6^{5}
5	(Italy) M Bellucci	6	7
(Lebanon) H Habib	3	5
WC	(Germany) M Topo	6	7^{10}
Q	(United Kingdom) K Edmund	4	6^{8}
(Turkey) E Kırkın	4	6	6
(Ukraine) I Marchenko	6	3	4
(Japan) Y Shimizu	7^{7}	6
2	(Japan) S Shimabukuro	6^{5}	4

Second round
8	(Switzerland) M-A Hüsler	4	7	4
Q	(Republic of Ireland) M Agwi	6	5	6
Q	(France) C Chidekh	6	6
WC	(Germany) N Kuhn	2	2
5	(Italy) M Bellucci	6	6
WC	(Germany) M Topo	4	4
(Turkey) E Kırkın	4	4
(Japan) Y Shimizu	6	6

Quarterfinals
Q	(Republic of Ireland) M Agwi	4	3
Q	(France) C Chidekh	6	6
5	(Italy) M Bellucci	4	6^{5}
(Japan) Y Shimizu	6	7^{7}

Semifinals
Q	(France) C Chidekh	6	7^{8}
(Japan) Y Shimizu	3	6^{6}
