= 2024 Tennis Challenger Hamburg – Doubles =

Doubles
- 2024 Tennis Challenger Hamburg

Final
- Champions: (Italy) Mattia Bellucci (Switzerland) Rémy Bertola
- Runners-up: (Poland) Karol Drzewiecki (Finland) Patrik Niklas-Salminen
- Score: 6–4, 7–5

Events
| Singles | Doubles |
- Tennis Challenger Hamburg

Dennis Novak and Akira Santillan were the defending champions but chose not to defend their title.

Mattia Bellucci and Rémy Bertola won the title after defeating Karol Drzewiecki and Patrik Niklas-Salminen 6–4, 7–5 in the final.

== Seeds ==
1. (Poland) Karol Drzewiecki / (Finland) Patrik Niklas-Salminen (final)
2. (Germany) Jakob Schnaitter / (Germany) Mark Wallner (quarterfinals)
3. (Chinese Taipei) Hsu Yu-hsiou / (Japan) Yuta Shimizu (withdrew)
4. (United Kingdom) Scott Duncan / (United Kingdom) Hamish Stewart (quarterfinals)

== Draw ==
Key

- Q = Qualifier
- WC = Wild card
- LL = Lucky loser
- Alt = Alternate
- ITF = ITF entry
- PR = Protected ranking
- SR = Special ranking
- SE = Special exempt
- JE = Junior exempt
- JR = Junior Accelerator Programme entrant
- CO = College Accelerator Programme entrant
- NG = Next Gen Accelerator Program entrant
- w/o = Walkover
- r = Retired
- d = Defaulted

First round
1 | (Poland) K Drzewiecki (Finland) P Niklas-Salminen | 6 | 6
WC | (Republic of Ireland) M Agwi (Germany) Serign Samba | 4 | 4
(Belgium) B Gadamauri (Denmark) J Ingildsen | 5 | 4
(Switzerland) M-A Hüsler (Switzerland) A Ritschard | 7 | 6
4 | (United Kingdom) S Duncan (United Kingdom) H Stewart | 6 | 3 | [10]
WC | (Germany) Liam Gavrielides (Germany) N Kuhn | 3 | 6 | [3]
(Turkey) S Ağabigün (Turkey) A Çelikbilek | 6 | 5 | [7]
(Italy) Andrea Picchione (Italy) L Rottoli | 4 | 7 | [10]
(Canada) S Diez (Turkey) E Kırkın | 3 | 4
(France) C Chidekh (France) L Sanchez | 6 | 6
(Bulgaria) A Andreev (Kazakhstan) D Yevseyev | 1 | 3
(Italy) M Bellucci (Switzerland) R Bertola | 6 | 6
(United Kingdom) J Choinski (United Kingdom) B Harris | 3 | 5
2 | (Germany) J Schnaitter (Germany) M Wallner | 6 | 7

Quarterfinals
1 | (Poland) K Drzewiecki (Finland) P Niklas-Salminen | w/o
(Switzerland) M-A Hüsler (Switzerland) A Ritschard
4 | (United Kingdom) S Duncan (United Kingdom) H Stewart | 6^{5} | 4
(Italy) A Picchione (Italy) L Rottoli | 7^{7} | 6
(France) C Chidekh (France) L Sanchez | 3 | 4
(Germany) S Fanselow (Switzerland) J Paul | 6 | 6
(Italy) M Bellucci (Switzerland) R Bertola | 5 | 7 | [10]
2 | (Germany) J Schnaitter (Germany) M Wallner | 7 | 5 | [4]

Semifinals
1 | (Poland) K Drzewiecki (Finland) P Niklas-Salminen | 6 | 6
(Italy) A Picchione (Italy) L Rottoli | 2 | 2
(Germany) S Fanselow (Switzerland) J Paul | 2 | 4
(Italy) M Bellucci (Switzerland) R Bertola | 6 | 6

Final
1 | (Poland) K Drzewiecki (Finland) P Niklas-Salminen | 4 | 5
(Italy) M Bellucci (Switzerland) R Bertola | 6 | 7
