= 2024 Tennis Challenger Hamburg =

- Date: 11–17 March
- Edition: 5th
- Category: ATP Challenger Tour
- Surface: Hard (Indoor)
- Location: Hamburg, Germany

Champions

Singles
- (Germany) Henri Squire

Doubles
- (Italy) Mattia Bellucci / (Switzerland) Rémy Bertola
← 2023 ·	Tennis Challenger Hamburg	· 2025 →

The 2024 Challenger Hamburg was a professional tennis tournament played on indoor hardcourts. It was the fifth edition of the tournament which was part of the 2024 ATP Challenger Tour. It took place in Hamburg, Germany between 11 and 17 March 2024.

== Champions ==
=== Singles ===
- (Germany) Henri Squire def. (France) Clément Chidekh 6–4, 6–2.

=== Doubles ===
- (Italy) Mattia Bellucci / (Switzerland) Rémy Bertola def. (Poland) Karol Drzewiecki / (Finland) Patrik Niklas-Salminen 6–4, 7–5.

== Singles main draw entrants ==
=== Seeds ===
Country	Player	Rank^{1}	Seed
GBR	Jan Choinski	172	1
JPN	Sho Shimabukuro	173	2
CHN	Bu Yunchaokete	175	3
GBR	Billy Harris	181	4
ITA	Mattia Bellucci	184	5
GER	Rudolf Molleker	187	6
SUI	Alexander Ritschard	198	7
SUI	Marc-Andrea Hüsler	199	8

- ^{1} Rankings are as of 4 March 2024.

=== Other entrants ===
The following players received wildcards into the singles main draw:

- (Germany) Nicola Kuhn
- (Germany) Max Hans Rehberg
- (Germany) Marko Topo

The following players received entry from the qualifying draw:

- (Republic of Ireland) Michael Agwi
- (Switzerland) Rémy Bertola
- (France) Clément Chidekh
- (France) Kenny de Schepper
- (United Kingdom) Kyle Edmund
- (Switzerland) Jakub Paul

The following player received entry as a lucky loser:

- (Kazakhstan) Denis Yevseyev
