= 2024 Ostra Group Open =

- Date: 22 – 28 April
- Edition: 21st
- Surface: Clay
- Location: Ostrava, Czech Republic

Champions

Singles
- (Bosnia and Herzegovina) Damir Džumhur

Doubles
- (Portugal) Jaime Faria / (Portugal) Henrique Rocha
- Ostra Group Open

The 2024 Ostra Group Open was a professional tennis tournament played on clay courts. It was the 21st edition of the tournament which was part of the 2024 ATP Challenger Tour. It took place in Ostrava, Czech Republic between 22 and 28 April 2024.

== Singles main-draw entrants ==
=== Seeds ===
| Country | Player | Rank^{1} | Seed |
|---|---|---|---|
| BIH | Damir Džumhur | 126 | 1 |
| CAN | Gabriel Diallo | 157 | 2 |
| UKR | Vitaliy Sachko | 181 | 3 |
| FRA | Benjamin Bonzi | 182 | 4 |
| FRA | Enzo Couacaud | 196 | 5 |
| SWE | Elias Ymer | 200 | 6 |
| POR | Henrique Rocha | 206 | 7 |
| AUT | Lukas Neumayer | 207 | 8 |

- ^{1} Rankings are as of 15 April 2024.

=== Other entrants ===
The following players received wildcards into the singles main draw:

- (Czech Republic) Jan Jermář
- (Czech Republic) Jan Kumstát
- (Slovakia) Peter Benjamín Privara

The following players received entry from the qualifying draw:

- (Belgium) Buvaysar Gadamauri
- (Slovakia) Norbert Gombos
- (Czech Republic) Dominik Kellovský
- (Czech Republic) Jakub Nicod
- (Austria) David Pichler
- (Netherlands) Jelle Sels

== Champions ==
=== Singles ===
- (Bosnia and Herzegovina) Damir Džumhur def. (Germany) Henri Squire 6–2, 4–6, 7–5.

=== Doubles ===
- (Portugal) Jaime Faria / (Portugal) Henrique Rocha def. (Germany) Jakob Schnaitter / (Germany) Mark Wallner 7–5, 6–3.
