= 2025 Internazionali di Tennis Città di Todi – Doubles =

Doubles
- 2025 Internazionali di Tennis Città di Todi

Final
- Champions: (Italy) Filippo Romano (Italy) Jacopo Vasamì
- Runners-up: (Israel) Daniel Cukierman (Denmark) Johannes Ingildsen
- Score: 6–4, 6–3

Events
| Singles | Doubles |
- Internazionali di Tennis Città di Todi

Ivan and Matej Sabanov were the defending champions but lost in the quarterfinals to Arjun Kadhe and Vijay Sundar Prashanth.

Filippo Romano and Jacopo Vasamì won the title after defeating Daniel Cukierman and Johannes Ingildsen 6–4, 6–3 in the final.

== Seeds ==
1. (Poland) Karol Drzewiecki / (Czech Republic) Matěj Vocel (first round)
2. (India) Arjun Kadhe / (India) Vijay Sundar Prashanth (semifinals)
3. (Israel) Daniel Cukierman / (Denmark) Johannes Ingildsen (final)
4. Ivan Liutarevich / (Bolivia) Federico Zeballos (quarterfinals)

== Draw ==
Key

- Q = Qualifier
- WC = Wild card
- LL = Lucky loser
- Alt = Alternate
- ITF = ITF entry
- PR = Protected ranking
- SR = Special ranking
- SE = Special exempt
- JE = Junior exempt
- JR = Junior Accelerator Programme entrant
- CO = College Accelerator Programme entrant
- NG = Next Gen Accelerator Program entrant
- w/o = Walkover
- r = Retired
- d = Defaulted

=== Draw ===
First round
1 | (Poland) K Drzewiecki (Czech Republic) M Vocel | 6^{5} | 2
(Spain) M Mansilla Díez (Spain) B Pujol Navarro | 7^{7} | 6
WC | (Italy) Pierluigi Basile (Italy) G Ricca | 7^{7} | 7^{7}
PR | (Italy) F Forti (Italy) Augusto Virgili | 6^{5} | 6^{5}
4 | I Liutarevich (Bolivia) F Zeballos | 6 | 7
(Portugal) T Pereira (Austria) D Pichler | 2 | 5
(Bolivia) B Arias (Bolivia) JC Prado Ángelo | 3 | 4
WC | (Italy) F Romano (Italy) J Vasamì | 6 | 6
Alt | (Italy) Simone Agostini (Finland) E Vasa | 6 | 7^{9}
(Netherlands) M Hermans (Australia) K Pearson | 4 | 6^{7}
(Romania) A Jecan (Spain) D Jordà Sanchis | 2 | 1
3 | (Israel) D Cukierman (Denmark) J Ingildsen | 6 | 6
(Germany) A Mies (Spain) D Vega Hernández | 6 | 6^{3} | [5]
(Serbia) I Sabanov (Serbia) M Sabanov | 3 | 7^{7} | [10]
(Argentina) JB Torres (Argentina) G Villanueva | 1 | 6^{6}
2 | (India) A Kadhe (India) VS Prashanth | 6 | 7^{8}

Quarterfinals
(Spain) M Mansilla Díez (Spain) B Pujol Navarro | 2 | 6 | [7]
WC | (Italy) P Basile (Italy) G Ricca | 6 | 3 | [10]
4 | I Liutarevich (Bolivia) F Zeballos | 6^{6} | 3
WC | (Italy) F Romano (Italy) J Vasamì | 7^{8} | 6
Alt | (Italy) S Agostini (Finland) E Vasa | 4 | 3
3 | (Israel) D Cukierman (Denmark) J Ingildsen | 6 | 6
(Serbia) I Sabanov (Serbia) M Sabanov | 4 | 2
2 | (India) A Kadhe (India) VS Prashanth | 6 | 6

Semifinals
WC | (Italy) P Basile (Italy) G Ricca | 1 | 2
WC | (Italy) F Romano (Italy) J Vasamì | 6 | 6
3 | (Israel) D Cukierman (Denmark) J Ingildsen | 6 | 6
2 | (India) A Kadhe (India) VS Prashanth | 3 | 4

Final
WC | (Italy) F Romano (Italy) J Vasamì | 6 | 6
3 | (Israel) D Cukierman (Denmark) J Ingildsen | 4 | 3
