= 2026 Internazionali di Tennis Città di Vicenza – Doubles =

Doubles
- 2026 Internazionali di Tennis Città di Vicenza

Final
- Champions: (Sweden) Erik Grevelius (Sweden) Adam Heinonen
- Runners-up: (Switzerland) Rémy Bertola (Italy) Francesco Forti
- Score: 7–6^{(7–1)}, 7–6^{(7–5)}

Events
Singles	Doubles
- Internazionali di Tennis Città di Vicenza

Federico Bondioli and Stefano Travaglia were the defending champions but only Travaglia chose to defend his title, partnering Marco Cecchinato. They lost in the first round to Bruno Pujol Navarro and Benjamín Winter López.

Erik Grevelius and Adam Heinonen won the title after defeating Rémy Bertola and Francesco Forti 7–6^{(7–1)}, 7–6^{(7–5)} in the final.

== Seeds ==
1. (South Korea) Nam Ji-sung / (Finland) Patrik Niklas-Salminen (quarterfinals)
2. (Bolivia) Boris Arias / (Denmark) Johannes Ingildsen (first round)
3. (Germany) Tim Rühl / (Netherlands) Mick Veldheer (semifinals)
4. (Spain) Sergio Martos Gornés / (Poland) Szymon Walków (semifinals)

== Draw ==
Key

- Q = Qualifier
- WC = Wild card
- LL = Lucky loser
- Alt = Alternate
- ITF = ITF entry
- PR = Protected ranking
- SR = Special ranking
- SE = Special exempt
- JE = Junior exempt
- JR = Junior Accelerator Programme entrant
- CO = College Accelerator Programme entrant
- NG = Next Gen Accelerator Program entrant
- w/o = Walkover
- r = Retired
- d = Defaulted

First round
1	(South Korea) J-s Nam (Finland) P Niklas-Salminen	4	7^{7}	[10]
(Chinese Taipei) J Jung (Japan) K Uesugi	6	6^{4}	[8]
(Switzerland) R Bertola (Italy) F Forti	6	6
WC	(Italy) Andrea Albiero (Italy) Pietro Cappellaro	2	1
3	(Germany) T Rühl (Netherlands) M Veldheer	7^{7}	6^{4}	[11]
(Venezuela) Juan José Bianchi (Bulgaria) A Genov	6^{2}	7^{7}	[9]
(Spain) B Pujol Navarro (Spain) B Winter López	7^{7}	6
(Italy) M Cecchinato (Italy) S Travaglia	6^{2}	4
(Netherlands) J Jans (Netherlands) T Loof	6	6
(Netherlands) J Sels (Ukraine) V Uzhylovskyi	1	2
(Chinese Taipei) Y-h Hsu (Australia) L Tu	4	2
4	(Spain) S Martos Gornés (Poland) S Walków	6	6
(Netherlands) M Hermans (Italy) G Ricca	4	3
WC	(Italy) Alessandro Battiston (Italy) Luca Castagnola	6	6
(Sweden) E Grevelius (Sweden) A Heinonen	6	7^{7}
2	(Bolivia) B Arias (Denmark) J Ingildsen	4	6^{4}

Quarterfinals
1	(South Korea) J-s Nam (Finland) P Niklas-Salminen	3	6^{6}
(Switzerland) R Bertola (Italy) F Forti	6	7^{8}
3	(Germany) T Rühl (Netherlands) M Veldheer	6	6
(Spain) B Pujol Navarro (Spain) B Winter López	3	2
(Netherlands) J Jans (Netherlands) T Loof	3	4
4	(Spain) S Martos Gornés (Poland) S Walków	6	6
WC	(Italy) A Battiston (Italy) L Castagnola	2	6	[7]
(Sweden) E Grevelius (Sweden) A Heinonen	6	2	[10]

Semifinals
(Switzerland) R Bertola (Italy) F Forti	6	6
3	(Germany) T Rühl (Netherlands) M Veldheer	3	2
4	(Spain) S Martos Gornés (Poland) S Walków	6	4	[4]
(Sweden) E Grevelius (Sweden) A Heinonen	2	6	[10]

Final
(Switzerland) R Bertola (Italy) F Forti	6^{1}	6^{5}
(Sweden) E Grevelius (Sweden) A Heinonen	7^{7}	7^{7}
