= 2026 Garden Open – Doubles =

Doubles
- 2026 Garden Open

Final
- Champions: (Colombia) Nicolás Barrientos (Uruguay) Ariel Behar
- Runners-up: (Slovakia) Miloš Karol (Czech Republic) Andrew Paulson
- Score: 7–6^{(7–4)}, 4–6, [10–7]

Events
Singles	Doubles
- Garden Open

Erik Grevelius and Adam Heinonen were the defending champions but chose not to defend their title.

Nicolás Barrientos and Ariel Behar won the title after defeating Miloš Karol and Andrew Paulson 7–6^{(7–4)}, 4–6, [10–7] in the final.

== Seeds ==
1. (Colombia) Nicolás Barrientos / (Uruguay) Ariel Behar (champions)
2. (United States) Benjamin Kittay / (United Kingdom) Marcus Willis (quarterfinals)
3. (Israel) Daniel Cukierman / (United States) Trey Hilderbrand (first round)
4. (Australia) Blake Bayldon / (Netherlands) Mick Veldheer (first round)

== Draw ==
Key

- Q = Qualifier
- WC = Wild card
- LL = Lucky loser
- Alt = Alternate
- ITF = ITF entry
- PR = Protected ranking
- SR = Special ranking
- SE = Special exempt
- JE = Junior exempt
- JR = Junior Accelerator Programme entrant
- CO = College Accelerator Programme entrant
- NG = Next Gen Accelerator Program entrant
- w/o = Walkover
- r = Retired
- d = Defaulted

First round
1	(Colombia) N Barrientos (Uruguay) A Behar	7	6
(Netherlands) M Hermans (New Zealand) J Watt	5	4
(Serbia) S Latinović (Germany) T Rühl	6	2	[10]
WC	(Italy) F Bondioli (Italy) CA Caniato	4	6	[4]
4	(Australia) B Bayldon (Netherlands) M Veldheer	2	6^{4}
WC	(Italy) A Vavassori (Italy) Matteo Vavassori	6	7^{7}
(Spain) S Martos Gornés (India) VSP Natarajan	6^{5}	4
(India) S Banthia (Bulgaria) A Donski	7^{7}	6
(Italy) G Cadenasso (Italy) F Romano	7^{7}	6
(Chinese Taipei) R Ho (Chinese Taipei) C-h Tseng	6^{4}	3
(Spain) Í Cervantes (Spain) B Pujol Navarro	7^{7}	4	[12]
3	(Israel) D Cukierman (United States) T Hilderbrand	6^{5}	6	[10]
(Slovakia) M Karol (Czech Republic) A Paulson	6	6
(Romania) A Jecan (Romania) B Pavel	1	2
(Spain) D Vega Hernández (Spain) B Winter López	3	6	[7]
2	(United States) B Kittay (United Kingdom) M Willis	6	3	[10]

Quarterfinals
1	(Colombia) N Barrientos (Uruguay) A Behar	6	6^{5}	[10]
(Serbia) S Latinović (Germany) T Rühl	3	7^{7}	[7]
WC	(Italy) A Vavassori (Italy) M Vavassori	6	3	[9]
(India) S Banthia (Bulgaria) A Donski	2	6	[11]
(Italy) G Cadenasso (Italy) F Romano	1	6	[10]
(Spain) Í Cervantes (Spain) B Pujol Navarro	6	3	[8]
(Slovakia) M Karol (Czech Republic) A Paulson	6	6
2	(United States) B Kittay (United Kingdom) M Willis	3	2

Semifinals
1	(Colombia) N Barrientos (Uruguay) A Behar	6	6
(India) S Banthia (Bulgaria) A Donski	4	4
(Italy) G Cadenasso (Italy) F Romano	6^{4}	0
(Slovakia) M Karol (Czech Republic) A Paulson	7^{7}	6

Final
1	(Colombia) N Barrientos (Uruguay) A Behar	7^{7}	4	[10]
(Slovakia) M Karol (Czech Republic) A Paulson	6^{4}	6	[7]
