= 2026 Internazionali di Tennis Città di Vicenza =

- Date: 25 – 31 May
- Edition: 11th
- Surface: Clay
- Location: Vicenza, Italy

Champions

Singles
- (Austria) Lukas Neumayer

Doubles
- (Sweden) Erik Grevelius / (Sweden) Adam Heinonen
- Internazionali di Tennis Città di Vicenza

The 2026 Internazionali di Tennis Città di Vicenza was a professional tennis tournament played on clay courts. It was the 11th edition of the tournament which was part of the 2026 ATP Challenger Tour. It took place in Vicenza, Italy between 25 and 31 May 2026.

== Singles main-draw entrants ==
=== Seeds ===
Country	Player	Rank^{1}	Seed
ITA	Stefano Travaglia	137	1
TUN	Moez Echargui	138	2
AUT	Joel Schwärzler	169	3
ITA	Marco Cecchinato	180	4
TPE	Tseng Chun-hsin	183	5
PER	Gonzalo Bueno	185	6
AUT	Lukas Neumayer	188	7
SUI	Jérôme Kym	193	8

- ^{1} Rankings are as of 18 May 2026.

=== Other entrants ===
The following players received wildcards into the singles main draw:

- (Italy) Luca Castagnola
- (Italy) Massimo Giunta
- (Italy) Jacopo Vasamì

The following player received entry into the singles main draw through the Next Gen Accelerator programme:

- (India) Manas Dhamne

The following players received entry into the singles main draw as alternates:

- (Germany) Diego Dedura
- (Australia) Li Tu

The following players received entry from the qualifying draw:

- (Switzerland) Mika Brunold
- (Italy) Tommaso Compagnucci
- (Italy) Enrico Dalla Valle
- (Italy) Pietro Fellin
- (Italy) Samuele Pieri
- (Italy) Giorgio Tabacco

== Champions ==
=== Singles ===
- (Austria) Lukas Neumayer def. (Italy) Jacopo Vasamì 6–2, 6–2.

=== Doubles ===
- (Sweden) Erik Grevelius / (Sweden) Adam Heinonen def. (Switzerland) Rémy Bertola / (Italy) Francesco Forti 7–6^{(7–1)}, 7–6^{(7–5)}.
