= 2024 Ostra Group Open – Singles =

Singles
- 2024 Ostra Group Open

Final
- Champion: (Bosnia and Herzegovina) Damir Džumhur
- Runner-up: (Germany) Henri Squire
- Score: 6–2, 4–6, 7–5

Events
Singles	Doubles
- Ostra Group Open

Zdeněk Kolář was the defending champion but withdrew before his quarterfinal match against Timofey Skatov.

Damir Džumhur won the title after defeating Henri Squire 6–2, 4–6, 7–5 in the final.

== Seeds ==
1. (Bosnia and Herzegovina) Damir Džumhur (champion)
2. (Canada) Gabriel Diallo (first round)
3. (Ukraine) Vitaliy Sachko (second round)
4. (France) Benjamin Bonzi (first round)
5. (France) Enzo Couacaud (second round, retired)
6. (Sweden) Elias Ymer (first round)
7. (Portugal) Henrique Rocha (first round)
8. (Austria) Lukas Neumayer (first round, retired)

== Draw ==
Key

- Q = Qualifier
- WC = Wild card
- LL = Lucky loser
- Alt = Alternate
- ITF = ITF entry
- PR = Protected ranking
- SR = Special ranking
- SE = Special exempt
- JE = Junior exempt
- JR = Junior Accelerator Programme entrant
- CO = College Accelerator Programme entrant
- NG = Next Gen Accelerator Program entrant
- w/o = Walkover
- r = Retired
- d = Defaulted

=== Finals ===
Semifinals
1	(Bosnia and Herzegovina) Damir Džumhur	w/o
(France) Manuel Guinard
(Kazakhstan) Timofey Skatov	3	4
(Germany) Henri Squire	6	6

Final
1	(Bosnia and Herzegovina) Damir Džumhur	6	4	7
(Germany) Henri Squire	2	6	5

=== Top half ===
First round
1	(Bosnia and Herzegovina) D Džumhur	6	6
(Romania) ND Ionel	3	3
Q	(Czech Republic) D Kellovský	4	4
WC	(Slovakia) Peter Benjamín Privara	6	6
(Italy) E Dalla Valle	6	6
WC	(Czech Republic) J Jermář	3	1
(Chinese Taipei) C-h Tseng	4	6	6
6	(Sweden) E Ymer	6	4	3
3	(Ukraine) V Sachko	5	6	6
Q	(Slovakia) N Gombos	7	2	3
(Portugal) J Faria	6	6
Q	(Austria) D Pichler	1	4
(France) M Guinard	7	7
Q	(Belgium) B Gadamauri	5	5
(Czech Republic) J Veselý	2	3
5	(France) E Couacaud	6	6

Second round
1	(Bosnia and Herzegovina) D Džumhur	6	6
WC	(Slovakia) PB Privara	2	3
(Italy) E Dalla Valle	6	6
(Chinese Taipei) C-h Tseng	3	1
3	(Ukraine) V Sachko	7	3	4
(Portugal) J Faria	5	6	6
(France) M Guinard	4	7^{13}	0
5	(France) E Couacaud	6	6^{11}	0^{r}

Quarterfinals
1	(Bosnia and Herzegovina) D Džumhur	6	5	6
(Italy) E Dalla Valle	4	7	3
(Portugal) J Faria	3	6	5
(France) M Guinard	6	3	7

Semifinals
1	(Bosnia and Herzegovina) D Džumhur	w/o
(France) M Guinard

=== Bottom half ===
First round
7	(Portugal) H Rocha	6^{5}	0
(Spain) D Rincón	7^{7}	6
(Kazakhstan) T Skatov	6	6
WC	(Czech Republic) J Kumstát	1	2
(Poland) M Kaśnikowski	6	6^{2}	1
Q	(Czech Republic) Jakub Nicod	1	7^{7}	6
(Czech Republic) Z Kolář	4	6	6
4	(France) B Bonzi	6	4	4
8	(Austria) L Neumayer	6	2	0^{r}
(Austria) D Novak	4	6	3
(Bulgaria) D Kuzmanov	5	6^{4}
(Belgium) G Onclin	7	7^{7}
(France) T Lamasine	3	6	5
Q	(Netherlands) J Sels	6	4	7
(Germany) H Squire	6	5	6
2	(Canada) G Diallo	2	7	4

Second round
(Spain) D Rincón	6^{3}	6	3
(Kazakhstan) T Skatov	7^{7}	3	6
Q	(Czech Republic) J Nicod	6^{5}	1^{r}
(Czech Republic) Z Kolář	7^{7}	2
(Austria) D Novak	7^{7}	6
(Belgium) G Onclin	6^{3}	2
Q	(Netherlands) J Sels	6^{4}	2
(Germany) H Squire	7^{7}	6

Quarterfinals
(Kazakhstan) T Skatov	w/o
(Czech Republic) Z Kolář
(Austria) D Novak	3	2
(Germany) H Squire	6	6

Semifinals
(Kazakhstan) T Skatov	3	4
(Germany) H Squire	6	6
