= 2024 Ostra Group Open – Doubles =

Doubles
- 2024 Ostra Group Open

Final
- Champions: (Portugal) Jaime Faria (Portugal) Henrique Rocha
- Runners-up: (Germany) Jakob Schnaitter (Germany) Mark Wallner
- Score: 7–5, 6–3

Events
Singles	Doubles
- Ostra Group Open

Robert Galloway and Miguel Ángel Reyes-Varela were the defending champions but only Reyes-Varela chose to defend his title, partnering Guido Andreozzi. He lost in the semifinals to Jaime Faria and Henrique Rocha.

Faria and Rocha won the title after defeating Jakob Schnaitter and Mark Wallner 7–5, 6–3 in the final.

== Seeds ==
1. (Argentina) Guido Andreozzi / (Mexico) Miguel Ángel Reyes-Varela (semifinals)
2. (Romania) Victor Vlad Cornea / (Austria) Philipp Oswald (first round)
3. (United States) Evan King / (Brazil) Orlando Luz (first round)
4. (France) Manuel Guinard / (France) Grégoire Jacq (first round)

== Draw ==
Key

- Q = Qualifier
- WC = Wild card
- LL = Lucky loser
- Alt = Alternate
- ITF = ITF entry
- PR = Protected ranking
- SR = Special ranking
- SE = Special exempt
- JE = Junior exempt
- JR = Junior Accelerator Programme entrant
- CO = College Accelerator Programme entrant
- NG = Next Gen Accelerator Program entrant
- w/o = Walkover
- r = Retired
- d = Defaulted

=== Draw ===
First round
1	(Argentina) G Andreozzi (Mexico) MÁ Reyes-Varela	7	6
(Sweden) F Bergevi (Netherlands) M Veldheer	5	1
(Czech Republic) D Poljak (Czech Republic) J Veselý
WC	(Czech Republic) J Jermář (Slovakia) I Zelenay	w/o
3	(United States) E King (Brazil) O Luz	7	4	[6]
(Czech Republic) P Rikl (Ukraine) V Sachko	5	6	[10]
(Portugal) J Faria (Portugal) H Rocha	6	2	[14]
(Poland) K Drzewiecki (Poland) M Kaśnikowski	3	6	[12]
(Croatia) Z Babić (Austria) D Pichler	3	6	[11]
(Serbia) I Sabanov (Serbia) M Sabanov	6	3	[9]
(Romania) A Jecan (Poland) S Walków	6	6
4	(France) M Guinard (France) G Jacq	3	4
(Czech Republic) R Jebavý (Czech Republic) Z Kolář	2	1
(Germany) J Schnaitter (Germany) M Wallner	6	6
WC	(Czech Republic) F Duda (Czech Republic) J Forejtek	6	6
2	(Romania) VV Cornea (Austria) P Oswald	3	2

Quarterfinals
1	(Argentina) G Andreozzi (Mexico) MÁ Reyes-Varela	6	6
WC	(Czech Republic) J Jermář (Slovakia) I Zelenay	3	3
(Czech Republic) P Rikl (Ukraine) V Sachko	1	6	[6]
(Portugal) J Faria (Portugal) H Rocha	6	0	[10]
(Croatia) Z Babić (Austria) D Pichler	6	2	[1]
(Romania) A Jecan (Poland) S Walków	4	6	[10]
(Germany) J Schnaitter (Germany) M Wallner	6	6
WC	(Czech Republic) F Duda (Czech Republic) J Forejtek	3	1

Semifinals
1	(Argentina) G Andreozzi (Mexico) MÁ Reyes-Varela	4	7	[9]
(Portugal) J Faria (Portugal) H Rocha	6	5	[11]
(Romania) A Jecan (Poland) S Walków	4	6	[3]
(Germany) J Schnaitter (Germany) M Wallner	6	4	[10]

Final
(Portugal) J Faria (Portugal) H Rocha	7	6
(Germany) J Schnaitter (Germany) M Wallner	5	3
