= Henri Squire =

German tennis player (born 2000)

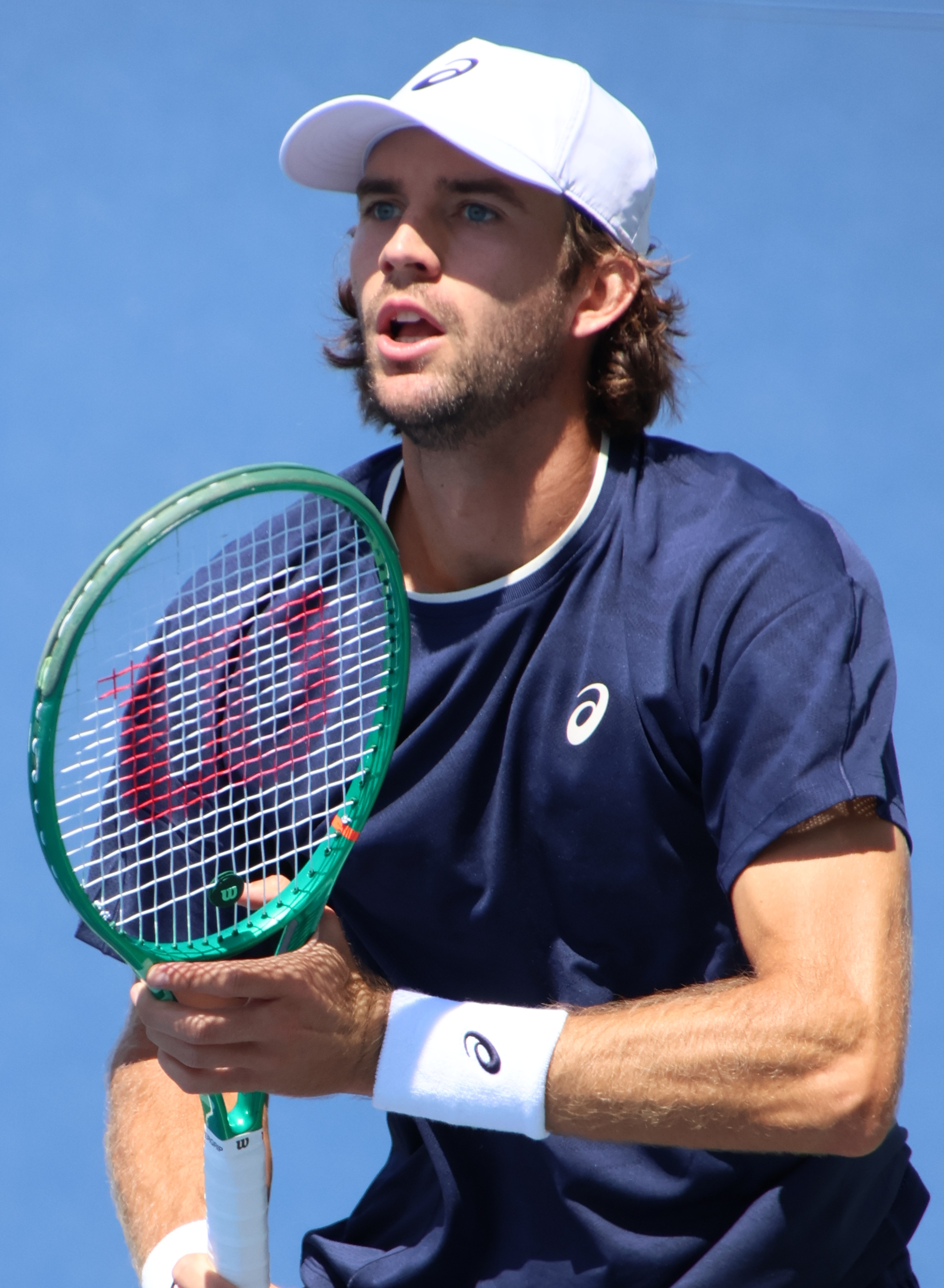
- Squire at the 2026 US Open
- Country (sports): Germany
- Born: 27 September 2000 (age 25) Duisburg, Germany
- Height: 1.96 m (6 ft 5 in)
- Plays: Right-handed (two-handed backhand)
- College: Wake Forest
- Coach: David Squire, Mark Joachim
- Prize money: US $552,966

Singles
- Career record: 1–5
- Career titles: 0
- Highest ranking: No. 169 (15 July 2024)
- Current ranking: No. 235 (22 June 2026)

Grand Slam singles results
- Australian Open: Q1 (2025)
- French Open: 2R (2024)
- Wimbledon: Q1 (2024, 2026)
- US Open: Q1 (2024, 2026)

Doubles
- Career record: 0–0
- Career titles: 0
- Highest ranking: No. 345 (28 August 2023)
- Current ranking: No. 894 (22 June 2026)
- Last updated on: 22 June 2026.

Henri Squire (born 27 September 2000) is a German tennis player. He has a career-high ATP singles ranking of world No. 169 achieved on 15 July 2024 and a doubles ranking of No. 345 attained on 28 August 2023.

He played two seasons of college tennis for Wake Forest and became 2021 ACC Freshman of the Year and 2021 First-Team all ACC Singles.

== Professional career ==
=== 2022: ATP debut ===
Squire made his ATP Tour main draw debut at the Halle Open as a wildcard, where he lost by retirement to Laslo Djere in the first round.

In November 2022, he won his first ATP Challenger Tour doubles title at the Trofeo Faip–Perrel in Bergamo, partnering Jan-Lennard Struff.

=== 2024: Major debut and first win, maiden Challenger title, top 200 ===
In March 2024, he won his maiden ATP Challenger Tour singles title in Hamburg, defeating Clément Chidekh in the final. Ranked No. 235, he reached a second Challenger final in Ostrava, losing to Damir Džumhur.

Ranked No. 211, he made his Grand Slam debut at the French Open after qualifying for the main draw and defeated Max Purcell in five sets with a super tiebreak in the fifth for his first Major win. As a result, he reached the top 200 in the singles rankings at world No. 178 on 10 June 2024. Squire received wildcards for the Stuttgart Open, the 2024 Halle Open, and for the 2024 Hamburg Open (where he withdrew).

== Singles performance timeline ==
Key
W	F	SF	QF	#R	RR	Q#	DNQ	A	NH

(W) winner; (F) finalist; (SF) semifinalist; (QF) quarterfinalist; (#R) rounds 4, 3, 2, 1; (RR) round-robin stage; (Q#) qualification round; (DNQ) did not qualify; (A) absent; (NH) not held; (SR) strike rate (events won / competed); (W–L) win–loss record.
To avoid confusion and double counting, these charts are updated at the conclusion of a tournament or when the player's participation has ended.

Current through the 2026 US Open qualifying.

Tournament	2022	2023	2024	2025	2026	SR	W–L
Grand Slam tournaments
Australian Open	A	A	A	Q1	A	0 / 0	0–0
French Open	A	A	2R	Q2	A	0 / 1	1–1
Wimbledon	A	A	Q1	A	Q1	0 / 0	0–0
US Open	A	A	Q1	A	Q1	0 / 0	0–0
Win–loss	0–0	0–0	1–1	0–0	0–0	0 / 1	1–1
Career statistics
Tournaments	1	0	3	0	0	4	
Overall win–loss	0–1	0–0	1–4	0–0	0–0	1–5	
Year-end ranking	357	262	177	278			

== ATP Challenger finals ==
=== Singles: 2 (1 title, 1 runner-up) ===
Finals by surface
Hard (1–0)
Clay (0–1)

Result	W–L	Date	Tournament	Surface	Opponent	Score
Win	1–0	Mar 2024	Hamburg, Germany	Hard (i)	(France) Clément Chidekh	6–4, 6–2
Loss	1–1	Apr 2024	Ostrava, Czech Republic	Clay	(Bosnia and Herzegovina) Damir Džumhur	2–6, 6–4, 5–7

=== Doubles 1 (1 title) ===
Finals by surface
Hard (1–0)
Clay (0–0)

Result	W–L	Date	Tournament	Surface	Partner	Opponents	Score
Win	1–0	Nov 2022	Bergamo, Italy	Hard (i)	(Germany) Jan-Lennard Struff	(France) Jonathan Eysseric (France) Albano Olivetti	6–4, 6–7^{(5–7)}, [10–7]

== ITF World Tennis Tour finals ==
=== Singles: 8 (2 titles, 6 runner-ups) ===
Finals by surface
Hard (1–3)
Clay (1–3)

Result	W–L	Date	Tournament	Surface	Opponent	Score
Loss	0–1	Aug 2021	M25 Überlingen, Germany	Clay	(Turkey) Ergi Kırkın	3–6, 6–4, 4–6
Loss	0–2	Sep 2021	M25 Pardubice, Czech Republic	Clay	(Austria) Filip Misolic	5–7, 3–6
Loss	0–3	Oct 2021	M25 Hamburg, Germany	Hard (i)	(Switzerland) Jakub Paul	4–6, 2–6
Loss	0–4	Feb 2022	M25 Glasgow, United Kingdom	Hard (i)	(United Kingdom) Alastair Gray	3–6, 7–6^{(8–6)}, 6–7^{(4–7)}
Win	1–4	Feb 2023	M25 Bath, United Kingdom	Hard (i)	(France) Jules Marie	6–3, 6–3
Loss	1–5	Mar 2023	M25 Montreal, Canada	Hard (i)	(Canada) Gabriel Diallo	6–7^{(5–7)}, 3–6
Loss	1–6	May 2023	M25 Prague, Czech Republic	Clay	(Austria) Lukas Neumayer	2–6, 3–6
Win	2–6	May 2023	M25 Most, Czech Republic	Clay	(Germany) Timo Stodder	6–1, 3–6, 6–0

=== Doubles: 2 (2 runner-ups) ===
Finals by surface
Hard (0–0)
Clay (0–2)

Result	W–L	Date	Tournament	Surface	Partner	Opponents	Score
Loss	0–1	Sep 2019	M15 Tabarka, Tunisia	Clay	(Germany) Paul Woerner	(Czech Republic) Moez Echargui (France) Thomas Setodji	2–6, 4–6
Loss	0–2	Jul 2025	M25 Kramsach, Austria	Clay	(Switzerland) Jeffrey von der Schulenburg	(Ukraine) Vladyslav Orlov (Ukraine) Oleksandr Ovcharenko	6–4, 6–7^{(6–8)}, [5–10]

== Junior Grand Slam finals ==
=== Doubles: 1 (1 runner-up) ===
Result	Year	Tournament	Surface	Partner	Opponent	Score
Loss	2018	Australian Open	Hard	(Germany) Rudolf Molleker	(France) Hugo Gaston (France) Clément Tabur	2–6, 2–6
