= Michael Agwi =

Irish tennis player (born 2003)

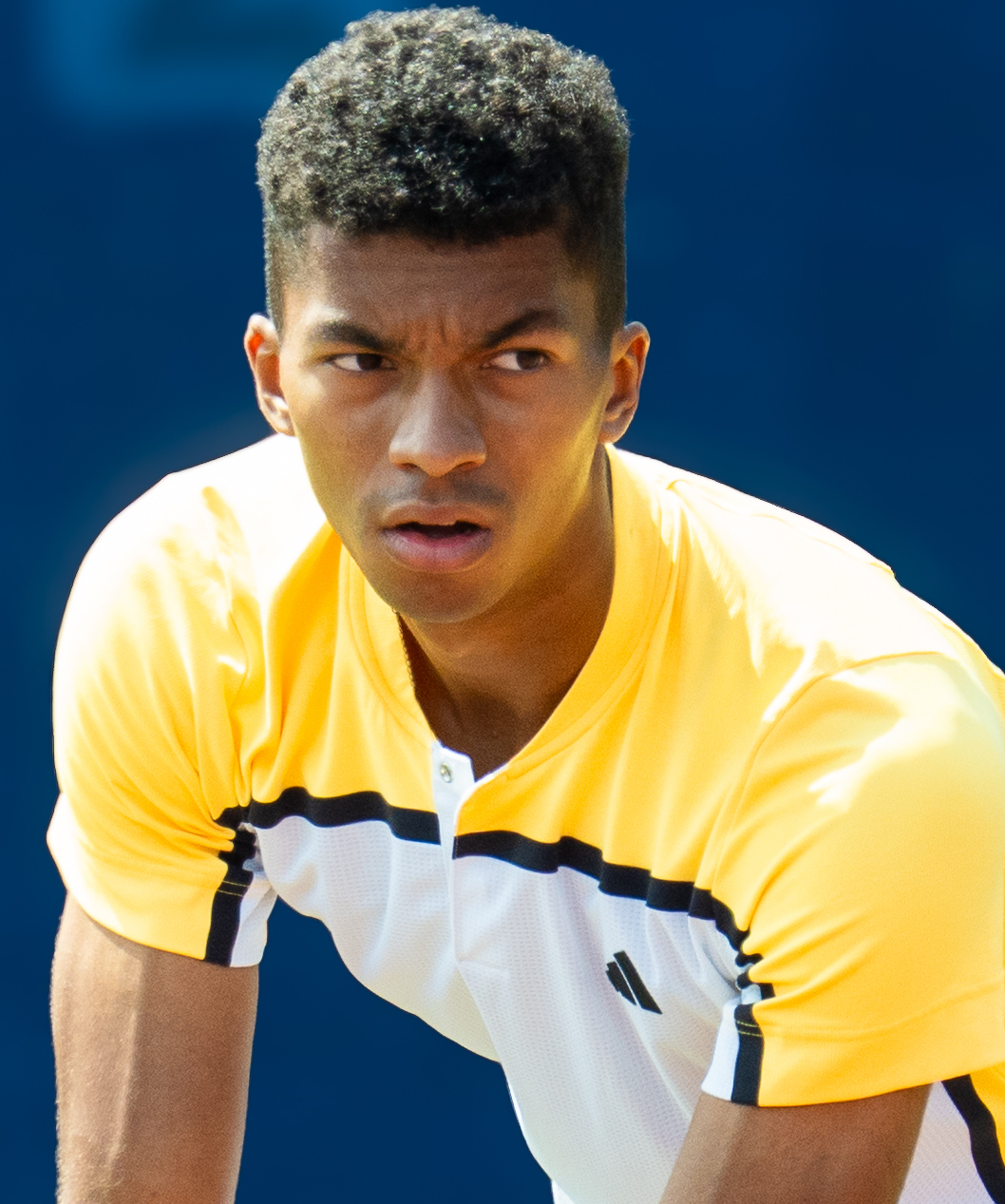
- Agwi during the final of the 2025 Irish Open
- Country (sports): Ireland
- Born: 4 September 2003 (age 23) Dublin, Ireland
- Height: 1.93 m (6 ft 4 in)
- Plays: Right-handed
- Prize money: US $53,245

Singles
- Career record: 4–6 (at ATP Tour level, Grand Slam level, and in Davis Cup)
- Career titles: 6 ITF
- Highest ranking: No. 407 (24 December 2024)
- Current ranking: No. 726 (19 October 2026)

Doubles
- Career record: 0–2 (at ATP Tour level, Grand Slam level, and in Davis Cup)
- Career titles: 1 ITF
- Highest ranking: No. 1,139 (18 November 2024)
- Current ranking: No. 1,488 (19 October 2026)
- Last updated on: 19 October 2026.

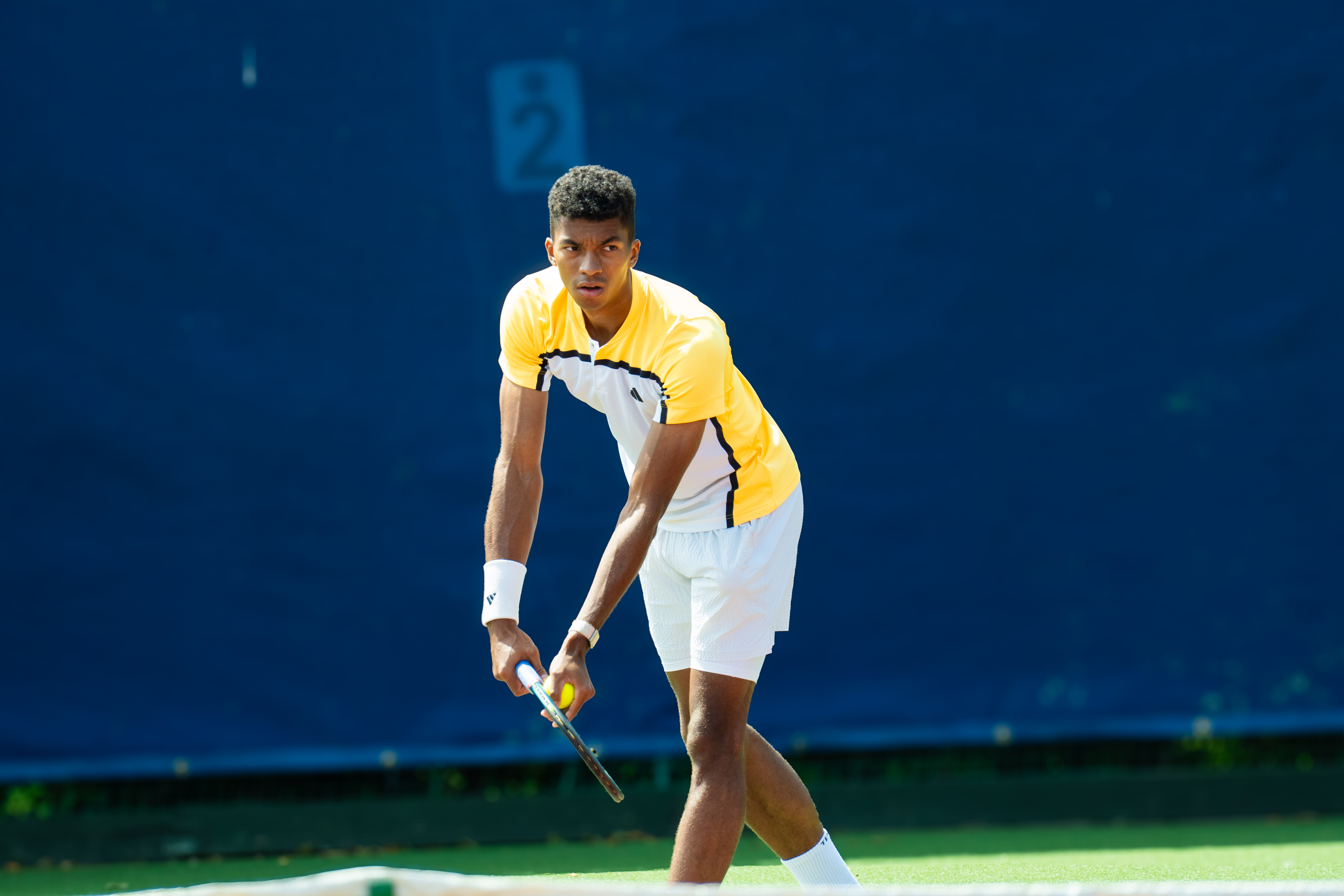
Michael Agwi serves during the final of the 2025 Irish Open at Carrickmines CLTC in Dublin.

Michael Agwi (born 4 September 2003) is an Irish tennis player. He has a career-high ATP singles ranking of No. 407 achieved on 23 December 2024 and a career-high ATP doubles ranking of No. 1,139 achieved on 18 November 2024.

== Career ==
Agwi has won six singles titles on the ITF Men's World Tennis Tour, beginning with an M15 title in Germany in early 2024, becoming the first Irish player in 5 years to win an ITF singles title.

In March 2024, Agwi qualified for his first ATP Challenger Tour main draw at the Tennis Challenger Hamburg, defeating Cem İlkel to claim his first Challenger main draw win. In the second round, he claimed his first win against a top 200 player, defeating the tournament's eighth seed and former top 50 player Marc-Andrea Hüsler to reach his first Challenger quarterfinal.

== International representation ==
Agwi represents Ireland at the Davis Cup, where he has a W/L record of 2–4. In February 2024, he was a member of the Irish team which was defeated by Austria in the World Group I play-offs in Limerick, losing both his matches against Dominic Thiem and Lucas Miedler.

== Personal life ==
Agwi is of Ukrainian and Nigerian descent.

== ATP Challenger and ITF World Tour finals ==
=== Singles: 9 (6 titles, 3 runner-ups) ===
Legend (singles) ATP Challengers (0–0) ITF WTT (6–3)	Finals by surface Hard (2–0) Clay (4–1) Grass (0–0) Carpet (0–2)

Result	W–L	Date	Tournament	Tier	Surface	Opponent	Score
Loss	0–1	Jan 2024	M15 Cadolzburg, Germany	ITF WTT	Carpet	(Germany) Daniel Masur	3–6, 6–3, 6–4
Win	1–1	Feb 2024	M15 Oberhaching, Germany	ITF WTT	Hard	(Germany) Max Hans Rehberg	7–6^{(7–3)}, 6–1
Win	2–1	Apr 2024	M15 Meerbusch, Germany	ITF WTT	Clay	(Germany) John Sperle	6–4, 6–2
Loss	2–2	May 2024	M15 Wrocław, Poland	ITF WTT	Clay	(Netherlands) Stijn Slump	6–3, 3–0 Ret.
Win	3–2	Jun 2024	M15 Antalya, Turkey	ITF WTT	Clay	(Poland) Pawel Juszczak	6-1, 7–6
Win	4–2	Oct 2024	M15 Grodzisk Mazowiecki, Poland	ITF WTT	Hard	(United Kingdom) Harry Wendelken	6–0, 6–1
Loss	4–3	Aug 2025	M15 Dublin, Ireland	ITF WTT	Carpet	(United Kingdom) Alastair Gray	2-6, 6–4, 7–5
Win	5–3	Aug 2025	M15 Trier, Germany	ITF WTT	Clay	(Germany) Adrian Oetzbach	7-5, 2–6, 6–3
Win	6–3	Aug 2026	M15 Trier, Germany	ITF WTT	Clay	(Slovenia) Žiga Šeško	6-2, 6–1
