= Monza Open =

- 2026 Monza Open

ATP Challenger Tour
- Event name: Atkinsons Monza Open
- Location: Monza, Italy
- Venue: Villa Reale Tennis club
- Category: ATP Challenger 125 (2026-)
- Surface: Clay
- Prize money: €203,900 (2026), 143,000 (2025)
- Website: villarealetennis.it

The Atkinsons Monza Open is a professional tennis tournament played on clay courts. It is currently part of the ATP Challenger Tour. It was first held in Monza, Italy in 2025. In 2026, the event was upgraded to an ATP Challenger 125.

== Past finals ==
=== Singles ===
Year	Champion	Runner-up	Score
2026	(Belgium) Raphaël Collignon	(Croatia) Dino Prižmić	7–6^{(7–2)}, 6–3
2025	(Belgium) Raphaël Collignon	(Ukraine) Vitaliy Sachko	6–3, 7–5

=== Doubles ===
Year	Champions	Runners-up	Score
2026	(Belgium) Sander Gillé (Netherlands) Sem Verbeek	(Switzerland) Jakub Paul (Czech Republic) Matěj Vocel	4–6, 7–6^{(7–3)}, [10–8]
2025	(Netherlands) Sander Arends (United Kingdom) Luke Johnson	(Italy) Filippo Romano (Italy) Jacopo Vasamì	6–1, 6–1
