= Andrea Guerrieri =

Italian tennis player (born 1998)

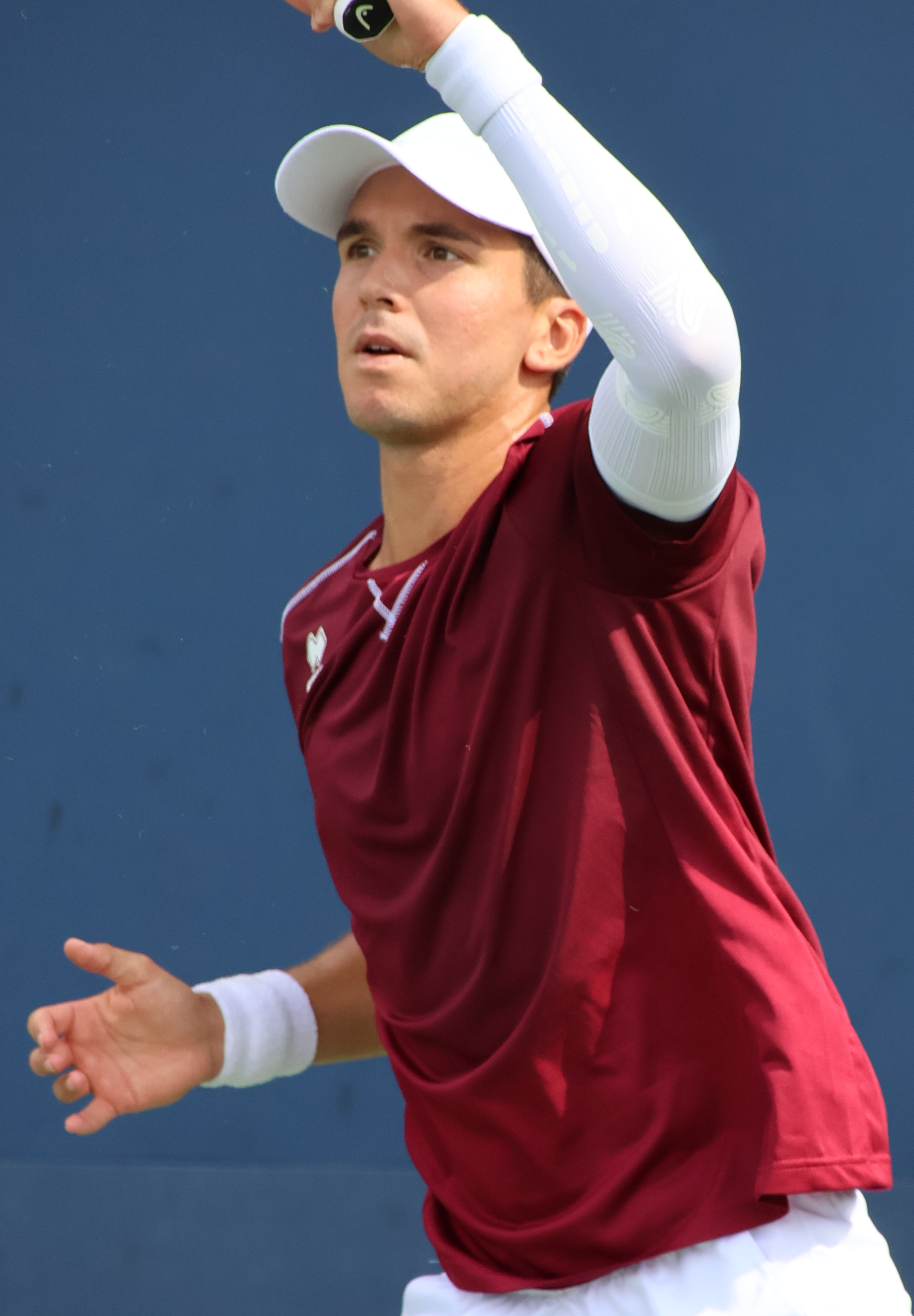
- Guerrieri at the 2026 US Open
- Country (sports): Italy
- Born: 3 December 1998 (age 27) Correggio, Italy
- Height: 1.80 m (5 ft 11 in)
- Plays: Left-handed (two-handed backhand)
- Coach: Giampaolo Coppo, Riccardo Maiga
- Prize money: US $355,217

Singles
- Career record: 0–2
- Career titles: 1 ATP Challenger, 3 ITF
- Highest ranking: No. 160 (9 November 2026)
- Current ranking: No. 160 (9 November 2026)

Grand Slam singles results
- Wimbledon: Q2 (2026)
- US Open: 1R (2026)

Doubles
- Career record: 0–0
- Career titles: 1 ITF
- Highest ranking: No. 747 (17 June 2019)
- Last updated on: 9 November 2026.

Andrea Guerrieri (Correggio, 3 December 1998) is an Italian professional tennis player. He has a career-high ATP singles ranking of No. 160 achieved on 9 November 2026 and a doubles ranking of No. 747 achieved on 17 June 2019.

== Career ==
Guerrieri won his maiden ATP Challenger singles title at the 2026 Garden Open.

== ATP Challenger Tour finals ==
=== Singles: 2 (1 title, 1 runner-up) ===
Legend ATP Challenger Tour (1–1)

Result	W–L	Date	Tournament	Tier	Surface	Opponent	Score
Win	1–0	Apr 2026	Garden Open, Italy	Challenger	Clay	(Czech Republic) Dalibor Svrčina	6–4, 2–6, 6–1
Loss	1–1	Aug 2026	Mazovia Open, Poland	Challenger	Hard	(Austria) Joel Schwärzler	6–7^{(4–7)}, 1–6
