= Jacopo Vasamì =

Italian tennis player (born 2007)

- Country (sports): Italy
- Born: 19 December 2007 (age 18) Avezzano, Italy
- Height: 1.93 m (6 ft 4 in)
- Plays: Left-handed (two-handed backhand)
- Coach: Fabrizio Zeppieri; Filippo Baldi
- Prize money: US $81,997

Singles
- Career record: 0–0 (at ATP Tour level, Grand Slam level, and in Davis Cup)
- Career titles: 0
- Highest ranking: No. 335 (22 June 2026)
- Current ranking: No. 335 (22 June 2026)

Doubles
- Career record: 0–1 (at ATP Tour level, Grand Slam level, and in Davis Cup)
- Career titles: 0; 1 Challenger
- Highest ranking: No. 387 (25 August 2025)
- Current ranking: No. 666 (22 June 2026)
- Last updated on: 22 June 2026.

Jacopo Vasamì (born 19 December 2007) is an Italian tennis player. He has a career-high ATP singles ranking of No. 335 achieved on 22 June 2026 and a doubles ranking of No. 387 achieved on 25 August 2025.

== Early life ==
Vasamì was born in Avezzano. He grew up playing tennis at Club Nomentano in Rome, and later graduated from the Rafa Nadal Academy in Manacor.

== Junior career ==
Vasamì had successful results on the ITF junior circuit, maintaining a 110–42 singles win-loss record. In May 2024, he won the J200 Torneo Bayer in Salsomaggiore Terme. In February 2025, he won the boys' singles category at the J500 EGY5 Smash Tournament in Cairo, Egypt and reached the final in doubles. Later that month, he was crowned champion at a prestigious home event, the J500 Trofeo Bonfiglio. In June, Vasamì reached the boys' singles quarterfinals at the French Open, losing to ninth seed Ivan Ivanov. Later that year, he qualified for the ITF Junior Finals in Chengdu. He reached an ITF junior combined ranking of world No. 2 on 9 June 2025.

== Professional career ==
Vasamì made his professional debut in November 2024 at the M15 event in San Gregorio di Catania. In March 2025, he won his first professional title, the doubles category at M15 Foggia, partnering with compatriot Filippo Romano. The next month, playing again with Romano, he reached his first Challenger final at the Monza Open. The Italian pair lost to second seeds Sander Arends and Luke Johnson. In May, Vasamì received a wildcard into the qualifying competition of the Italian Open. The following month, he reached the semifinals of the Aspria Tennis Cup. In August, Vasamì earned his first Challenger title at Internazionali di Todi. Partnering again with Romano, the pair and home favourites defeated third seeds Daniel Cukierman and Johannes Ingildsen in straight sets.

== ATP Challenger Tour finals ==
=== Singles: 1 (runner-up) ===
Legend ATP Challenger Tour (0–1)

Result	W–L	Date	Tournament	Tier	Surface	Opponent	Score
Loss	0–1	May 2026	Internazionali Città di Vicenza, Italy	Challenger	Clay	(Austria) Lukas Neumayer	2–6, 2–6

=== Doubles: 2 (1 title, 1 runner-up) ===
Legend ATP Challenger Tour (1–1)

Result	W–L	Date	Tournament	Tier	Surface	Partner	Opponents	Score
Loss	0–1	Apr 2025	Monza Open, Italy	Challenger	Clay	(Italy) Filippo Romano	(Netherlands) Sander Arends (United Kingdom) Luke Johnson	1–6, 1–6
Win	1–1	Aug 2025	Internazionali Città di Todi, Italy	Challenger	Clay	(Italy) Filippo Romano	(Israel) Daniel Cukierman (Denmark) Johannes Ingildsen	6–4, 6–3

== ITF World Tennis Tour finals ==
=== Singles: 2 (2 runner-ups) ===
Legend ITF WTT (0–2)

Result	W–L	Date	Tournament	Tier	Surface	Opponent	Score
Loss	0–1	Feb 2026	M25 Trento, Italy	WTT	Hard (i)	(Italy) Andrea Guerrieri	6–7^{(3–7)}, 6–7^{(4–7)}
Loss	0–2	Mar 2026	M25 Badalona, Spain	WTT	Clay	(Spain) Iñaki Montes de la Torre	4–6, 2–6

=== Doubles: 1 (title) ===
Legend ITF WTT (1–0)

Result	W–L	Date	Tournament	Tier	Surface	Partner	Opponents	Score
Win	1–0	Mar 2025	M15 Foggia, Italy	WTT	Clay	(Italy) Filippo Romano	(Italy) Alessio De Bernardis (Italy) Manuel Plunger	6–1, 6–4
