= Rémy Bertola =

Swiss tennis player (born 1998)

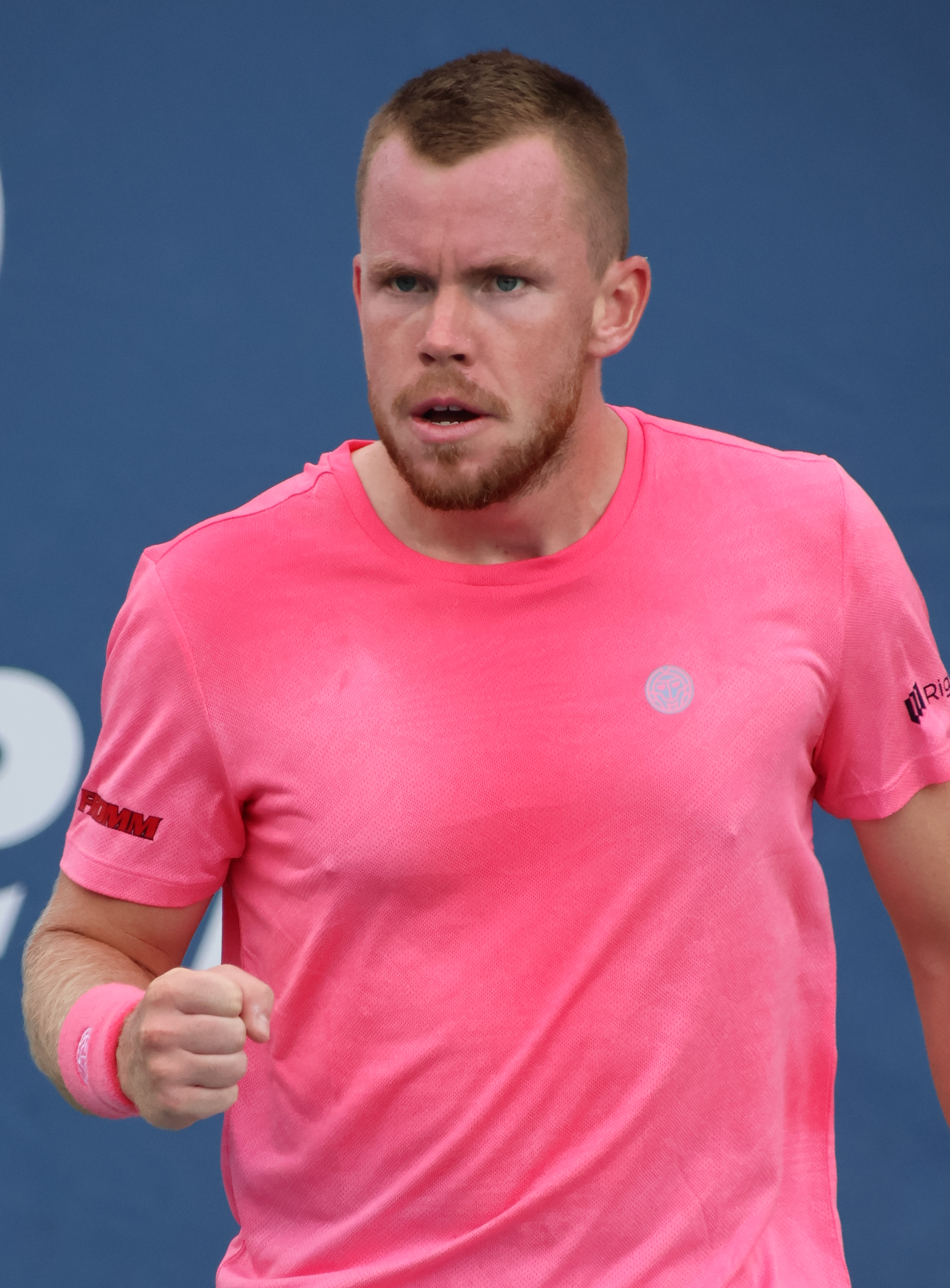
- Bertola at the 2026 US Open
- Country (sports): Switzerland
- Born: 31 August 1998 (age 28) Lugano, Switzerland
- Height: 1.75 m (5 ft 9 in)
- Plays: Right-handed (one-handed backhand)
- Coach: Alberto Gillerio, Gianluca Santagostino
- Prize money: US $419,442

Singles
- Career record: 2–1
- Career titles: 0
- Highest ranking: No. 174 (24 August 2026)
- Current ranking: No. 174 (24 August 2026)

Grand Slam singles results
- French Open: Q2 (2026)
- Wimbledon: Q3 (2026)
- US Open: Q2 (2026)

Doubles
- Career record: 0–0
- Career titles: 0
- Highest ranking: No. 200 (5 August 2024)
- Current ranking: No. 521 (24 August 2026)
- Last updated on: 25 August 2026.

Rémy Bertola (born 31 August 1998) is a Swiss tennis player. He has a career-high ATP singles ranking of world No. 174 achieved on 24 August 2026 and a doubles ranking of No. 200 achieved on 5 August 2024. He is currently the No. 4 Swiss player.

== Career ==
Bertola won his maiden ATP Challenger doubles title at the 2024 Tennis Challenger Hamburg with Mattia Bellucci.

Bertola qualified for the main draw at the 2025 Swiss Indoors in Basel, making his ATP debut.

== ATP Challenger Tour finals ==
=== Singles: 1 (1 runner-up) ===
Legend ATP Challenger Tour (0–1)	Finals by surface Hard (0–1)

Result	W–L	Date	Tournament	Tier	Surface	Opponent	Score
Loss	0–1	Jan 2026	Open Quimper Bretagne, France	Challenger	Hard (i)	(France) Luca Van Assche	6–3, 1–6, 5–7.

=== Doubles: 2 (1 title, 1 runner-up) ===
Legend ATP Challenger Tour (1–1)	Finals by surface Hard (1–0) Clay (0–1)

Result	W–L	Date	Tournament	Tier	Surface	Partner	Opponents	Score
Win	1–0	Mar 2024	Hamburg, Germany	Challenger	Hard (i)	(Italy) Mattia Bellucci	(Poland) Karol Drzewiecki (Finland) Patrik Niklas-Salminen	6–4, 7–5
Loss	1–1	May 2026	Vicenza, Italy	Challenger	Clay	(Italy) Francesco Forti	(Sweden) Erik Grevelius (Sweden) Adam Heinonen	6–7^{(1–7)}, 6–7^{(5–7)}
