= 2005–06 Villarreal CF season =

Villarreal
2005–06 season
- President: Fernando Roig
- Head coach: Manuel Pellegrini
- Stadium: El Madrigal
- La Liga: 7th
- Copa del Rey: Round of 16
- UEFA Champions League: Semi-finals
- Top goalscorer: League: Juan Román Riquelme (12); All: Juan Román Riquelme (12)
Home colours	Away colours

The 2005–06 season was Villarreal Club de Fútbol's 83rd season in existence and the club's 6th consecutive season in the top flight of Spanish football. In addition to the domestic league, Villarreal participated in this season's editions of the Copa del Rey and the UEFA Champions League. The season covered the period from 1 July 2005 to 30 June 2006.

== Season summary ==
Villarreal reached the semi-finals of the UEFA Champions League, being knocked out by eventual runners-up Arsenal 1–0 on aggregate, with Arsenal keeper Jens Lehmann saving a last-minute Juan Román Riquelme penalty, in the second leg, that would have taken the tie to extra time in front of Villarreal's home support.

Despite Villarreal's excellent form in Europe, the continental success was not translated to the domestic stage. Villarreal finished seventh, consigning them to Intertoto Cup football.

== Squad ==
Squad at end of season

Note: Flags indicate national team as defined under FIFA eligibility rules; some limited exceptions apply. Players may hold more than one non-FIFA nationality.

No.	Pos.	Nation	Player
1	GK	ESP	Javier López Vallejo
2	DF	ARG	Gonzalo Rodríguez
3	DF	ARG	Rodolfo Arruabarrena
4	DF	ESP	César Arzo Amposta
5	FW	URU	Diego Forlán
6	MF	ESP	Josico
7	FW	ESP	Antonio Guayre
8	MF	ARG	Juan Román Riquelme
9	FW	MEX	Guillermo Franco (Note: Franco was born in Corrientes, Argentina, but became a naturalised Mexican citizen in 2004 and made his international debut for Mexico in 2005.)
10	MF	ESP	Roger
11	MF	ESP	Javier Calleja
12	DF	ARG	Juan Pablo Sorín
13	GK	URU	Sebastián Viera
14	MF	ESP	Héctor Font
16	DF	ESP	Quique Álvarez
17	DF	ESP	Javi Venta

No.	Pos.	Nation	Player
18	MF	ITA	Alessio Tacchinardi (on loan from Juventus)
19	MF	ESP	Marcos Senna (Note: Senna was born in São Paulo, Brazil, but obtained Spanish citizenship in 2006 and made his international debut for Spain in March 2006.)
21	MF	ESP	Santi Cazorla
22	DF	BOL	Juan Manuel Peña
23	FW	ESP	José Mari
24	DF	ESP	Josemi
25	GK	ARG	Mariano Barbosa
26	FW	ESP	Xisco Nadal
29	FW	ESP	Jony
30	DF	ESP	Carlos Alcántara
31	GK	ESP	Juan Carlos
32	MF	ESP	Javi Rubio
35	DF	ESP	Nino
36	FW	ESP	Óscar López
44	MF	ESP	Marquitos
46	MF	ESP	David Fuster

=== Left club during season ===
Note: Flags indicate national team as defined under FIFA eligibility rules; some limited exceptions apply. Players may hold more than one non-FIFA nationality.

No.	Pos.	Nation	Player
9	FW	ARG	Luciano Figueroa (on loan to River Plate)
15	DF	NED	Jan Kromkamp (to Liverpool)

No.	Pos.	Nation	Player
20	MF	ECU	Luis Antonio Valencia (on loan to Recreativo de Huelva)

== Competitions ==
=== Overall record ===
Competition	First match	Last match	Starting round	Final position	Record							
Competition	First match	Last match	Starting round	Final position	Pld	W	D	L	GF	GA	GD	Win %
La Liga	28 August 2005	13 May 2006	Matchday 1	7th	38	14	15	9	50	39	+11	36.84
Copa del Rey	4 January 2006	11 January 2006	Round of 16	Round of 16	2	0	0	2	0	3	−3	0.00
UEFA Champions League	9 August 2005	25 April 2006	Third qualifying round	Semi-finals	14	5	7	2	12	9	+3	35.71
Total					54	19	22	13	62	51	+11	35.19

Source: Competitions

=== La Liga ===
==== League table ====
Pos	Team	Pld	W	D	L	GF	GA	GD	Pts	Qualification or relegation
5	Sevilla	38	20	8	10	54	39	+15	68	Qualification for the UEFA Cup first round
6	Celta Vigo	38	20	4	14	45	33	+12	64	Qualification for the UEFA Cup first round
7	Villarreal	38	14	15	9	50	39	+11	57	Qualification for the Intertoto Cup third round
8	Deportivo La Coruña	38	15	10	13	47	45	+2	55	
9	Getafe	38	15	9	14	54	49	+5	54	

Source: LFP
Rules for classification: 1st points; 2nd head-to-head points; 3rd head-to-head goal difference; 4th head-to-head goals scored; 5th goal difference; 6th number of goals scored; 7th Fair-play points

==== Results summary ====
Overall								Home						Away					
Pld	W	D	L	GF	GA	GD	Pts	W	D	L	GF	GA	GD	W	D	L	GF	GA	GD
38	14	15	9	50	39	+11	57	9	6	4	28	18	+10	5	9	5	22	21	+1

Source: La Liga

==== Results by round ====
Round	1	2	3	4	5	6	7	8	9	10	11	12	13	14	15	16	17	18	19	20	21	22	23	24	25	26	27	28	29	30	31	32	33	34	35	36	37	38
Ground	A	H	A	H	A	H	A	H	A	H	A	H	A	H	A	H	A	H	A	H	A	H	A	H	A	H	A	H	A	H	A	H	A	H	A	H	A	H
Result	L	D	D	L	W	W	D	W	W	D	W	D	W	L	W	W	D	D	L	W	L	D	L	W	D	W	D	D	D	L	W	D	L	L	D	W	D	W
Position	14	15	19	20	14	9	9	8	7	6	5	5	3	6	4	4	4	5	6	5	6	7	8	7	8	7	7	7	8	8	8	8	8	10	10	8	8	7

Source: La Liga
A = Away; H = Home; W = Win; D = Draw; L = Loss

==== Matches ====
28 August 2005 1	Osasuna	2–1	Villarreal	Pamplona
				Stadium: El Sadar

11 September 2005 2	Villarreal	1–1	Sevilla	Villarreal
				Stadium: El Madrigal

18 September 2005 3	Cádiz	1–1	Villarreal	Cádiz
				Stadium: Ramón de Carranza

21 September 2005 4	Villarreal	1–2	Celta Vigo	Villarreal
				Stadium: El Madrigal

24 September 2005 5	Espanyol	1–2	Villarreal	Barcelona
				Stadium: Olímpic Lluís Companys

2 October 2005 6	Villarreal	3–1	Athletic Bilbao	Villarreal
				Stadium: El Madrigal

15 October 2005 7	Alavés	1–1	Villarreal	Vitoria-Gasteiz
				Stadium: Mendizorrotza

23 October 2005 8	Villarreal	3–0	Mallorca	Villarreal
				Stadium: El Madrigal

26 October 2005 9	Real Betis	2–3	Villarreal	Seville
				Stadium: Manuel Ruiz de Lopera

30 October 2005 10	Atlético Madrid	1–1	Villarreal	Madrid
				Stadium: Vicente Calderón

5 November 2005 11	Villarreal	1–0	Valencia	Villarreal
				Stadium: El Madrigal

19 November 2005 12	Villarreal	0–0	Zaragoza	Villarreal
				Stadium: El Madrigal

27 November 2005 13	Deportivo La Coruña	0–2	Villarreal	A Coruña
				Stadium: Riazor

4 December 2005 14	Villarreal	0–2	Barcelona	Villarreal
				Stadium: El Madrigal

10 December 2005 15	Real Sociedad	1–3	Villarreal	San Sebastián
				Stadium: Anoeta

18 December 2005 16	Villarreal	2–1	Getafe	Villarreal
				Stadium: El Madrigal

21 December 2005 17	Málaga	0–0	Villarreal	Málaga
				Stadium: La Rosaleda

8 January 2006 18	Villarreal	0–0	Real Madrid	Villarreal
				Stadium: El Madrigal

15 January 2006 19	Racing Santander	1–0	Villarreal	Santander
				Stadium: El Sardinero

22 January 2006 20	Villarreal	2–1	Osasuna	Villarreal
				Stadium: El Madrigal

29 January 2006 21	Sevilla	2–0	Villarreal	Seville
				Stadium: Ramón Sánchez Pizjuán

5 February 2006 22	Villarreal	1–1	Cádiz	Villarreal
				Stadium: El Madrigal

12 February 2006 23	Celta Vigo	1–0	Villarreal	Vigo
				Stadium: Balaídos

18 February 2006 24	Villarreal	4–0	Espanyol	Villarreal
				Stadium: El Madrigal

26 February 2006 25	Athletic Bilbao	1–1	Villarreal	Bilbao
				Stadium: San Mamés

4 March 2006 26	Villarreal	3–2	Alavés	Villarreal
				Stadium: El Madrigal

12 March 2006 27	Mallorca	1–1	Villarreal	Palma
				Stadium: Estadi de Son Moix

18 March 2006 28	Villarreal	1–1	Atlético Madrid	Villarreal
				Stadium: El Madrigal

22 March 2006 29	Valencia	1–1	Villarreal	Valencia
				Stadium: Mestalla

25 March 2006 30	Villarreal	1–2	Real Betis	Villarreal
				Stadium: El Madrigal

1 April 2006 31	Zaragoza	0–1	Villarreal	Zaragoza
				Stadium: La Romareda

9 April 2006 32	Villarreal	1–1	Deportivo La Coruña	Villarreal
				Stadium: El Madrigal

14 April 2006 33	Barcelona	1–0	Villarreal	Barcelona
				Stadium: Camp Nou

22 April 2006 34	Villarreal	0–2	Real Sociedad	Villarreal
				Stadium: El Madrigal

30 April 2006 35	Getafe	1–1	Villarreal	Getafe
				Stadium: Coliseum Alfonso Pérez

3 May 2006 36	Villarreal	2–1	Málaga	Villarreal
				Stadium: El Madrigal

7 May 2006 37	Real Madrid	3–3	Villarreal	Madrid
				Stadium: Santiago Bernabéu

13 May 2006 38	Villarreal	2–0	Racing Santander	Villarreal
				Stadium: El Madrigal

=== Copa del Rey ===
==== Round of 16 ====
4 January 2006 First leg	Villarreal	0–2	Valencia	Villarreal
21:45 CET (UTC+1)		Report	Regueiro 53'; Villa 65'	Stadium: El Madrigal; Referee: Rafael Ramírez Domínguez

11 January 2006 Second leg	Valencia	1–0 (3–0 agg.)	Villarreal	Valencia
21:45 CET (UTC+1)		Report	Miguel 58'	Stadium: Mestalla; Referee: Alfonso Pérez Burrull

=== UEFA Champions League ===
==== Third qualifying round ====
9 August 2005 First leg	Everton (England)	1–2	(Spain) Villarreal	Liverpool, England
21:05 CEST (UTC+2)	Beattie 42'	Report	Figueroa 27'; Josico 45+1'	Stadium: Goodison Park; Attendance: 37,685; Referee: Tom Henning Øvrebø (Norway)

24 August 2005 Second leg	Villarreal (Spain)	2–1 (4–2 agg.)	(England) Everton	Villarreal, Spain
22:00 CEST (UTC+2)	Sorín 21'; Forlán 90+2'	Report	Arteta 69'	Stadium: El Madrigal; Attendance: 21,500; Referee: Pierluigi Collina (Italy)

==== Group stage ====
Pos	Team	Pld	W	D	L	GF	GA	GD	Pts	Qualification	VIL	BEN	LIL	MUN
1	(Spain) Villarreal	6	2	4	0	3	1	+2	10	Advance to knockout stage	—	1–1	1–0	0–0
2	(Portugal) Benfica	6	2	2	2	5	5	0	8	Advance to knockout stage	0–1	—	1–0	2–1
3	(France) Lille	6	1	3	2	1	2	−1	6	Transfer to UEFA Cup	0–0	0–0	—	1–0
4	(England) Manchester United	6	1	3	2	3	4	−1	6		0–0	2–1	0–0	—

Source: RSSSF

14 September 2005 1	Villarreal (Spain)	0–0	(England) Manchester United	Villarreal, Spain
20:45 CEST (UTC+2)		Report		Stadium: El Madrigal; Attendance: 19,550; Referee: Kim Milton Nielsen (Denmark)

27 September 2005 2	Lille (France)	0–0	(Spain) Villarreal	Paris, France
20:45 CEST (UTC+2)		Report		Stadium: Stade de France; Attendance: 35,153; Referee: Peter Fröjdfeldt (Sweden)

18 October 2005 3	Villarreal (Spain)	1–1	(Portugal) Benfica	Villarreal, Spain
20:45 CEST (UTC+2)	Riquelme 72' (pen.)	Report	Fernandes 77'	Stadium: El Madrigal; Attendance: 15,072; Referee: Florian Meyer (Germany)

2 November 2005 4	Benfica (Portugal)	0–1	(Spain) Villarreal	Lisbon, Portugal
20:45 CET (UTC+1)		Report	Senna 81'	Stadium: Estádio da Luz; Attendance: 48,014; Referee: Frank De Bleeckere (Belgium)

22 November 2005 5	Manchester United (England)	0–0	(Spain) Villarreal	Manchester, England
20:45 CET (UTC+1)		Report		Stadium: Old Trafford; Attendance: 67,471; Referee: Massimo De Santis (Italy)

7 December 2005 6	Villarreal (Spain)	1–0	(France) Lille	Villarreal, Spain
20:45 CET (UTC+1)	Guayre 67'	Report		Stadium: El Madrigal; Attendance: 15,751; Referee: Valentin Ivanov (Russia)

==== Knockout phase ====
===== Round of 16 =====
22 February 2006 First leg	Rangers (Scotland)	2–2	(Spain) Villarreal	Glasgow, Scotland
20:45 CET (UTC+1)	Løvenkrands 22'; Peña 82' (o.g.)	Report	Riquelme 8' (pen.); Forlán 35'	Stadium: Ibrox Stadium; Attendance: 49,372; Referee: Eric Poulat (France)

7 March 2006 Second leg	Villarreal (Spain)	1–1 (3 (a)–3 agg.)	(Scotland) Rangers	Villarreal, Spain
20:45 CET (UTC+1)	Arruabarrena 49'	Report	Løvenkrands 12'	Stadium: El Madrigal; Attendance: 19,828; Referee: Alain Hamer (Luxembourg)

===== Quarter-finals =====
29 March 2006 First leg	Internazionale (Italy)	2–1	(Spain) Villarreal	Milan, Italy
20:45 CEST (UTC+2)	Adriano 7'; Martins 54'	Report	Forlán 1'	Stadium: San Siro; Attendance: 49,165; Referee: Alain Sars (France

4 April 2006 Second leg	Villarreal (Spain)	1–0 (2 (a)–2 agg.)	(Italy) Internazionale	Villarreal, Spain
20:45 CEST (UTC+2)	Arruabarrena 58'	Report		Stadium: El Madrigal; Attendance: 21,700; Referee: Kyros Vassaras (Greece)

===== Semi-finals =====
19 April 2006 First leg	Arsenal (England)	1–0	(Spain) Villarreal	London, England
20:45 CEST (UTC+2)	Touré 41'	Report		Stadium: Highbury; Attendance: 35,438; Referee: Konrad Plautz (Austria)

25 April 2006 Second leg	Villarreal (Spain)	0–0 (0–1 agg.)	(England) Arsenal	Villarreal, Spain
20:45 CEST (UTC+2)		Report		Stadium: El Madrigal; Attendance: 21,237; Referee: Valentin Ivanov (Russia)
