= Diego Forlán =

Uruguayan footballer and manager (born 1979)

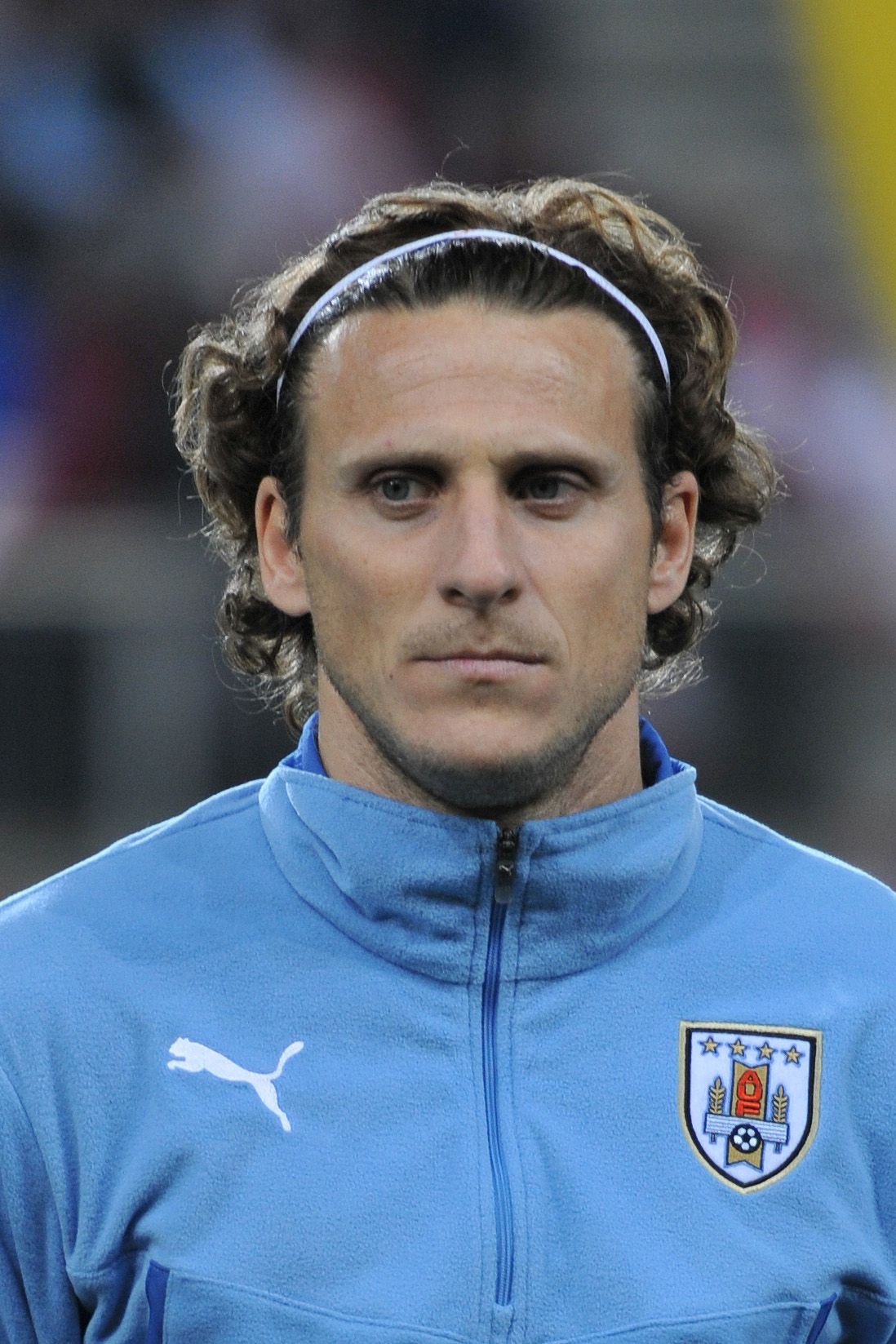
- Forlán lining up for Uruguay in 2014

Personal information
- Full name: Diego Martín Forlán Corazo
- Date of birth: 19 May 1979 (age 47)
- Place of birth: Montevideo, Uruguay
- Height: 1.80 m (5 ft 11 in)
- Position: Forward

Team information
- Current team: Uruguay (head coach); Uruguay U20 (head coach)

Youth career
- 1990–1991: Peñarol
- 1991–1994: Danubio
- 1994–1997: Independiente

Senior career*
Years	Team	Apps	(Gls)
1997–2002	Independiente	80	(37)
2002–2004	Manchester United	63	(10)
2004–2007	Villarreal	106	(54)
2007–2011	Atlético Madrid	134	(74)
2011–2012	Inter Milan	18	(2)
2012–2014	Internacional	34	(10)
2014–2015	Cerezo Osaka	42	(17)
2015–2016	Peñarol	30	(8)
2016	Mumbai City	11	(5)
2018	Kitchee	7	(5)
Total		525	(222)

International career
1999	Uruguay U20		
2002–2014	Uruguay	112	(36)

Managerial career
- 2020: Peñarol
- 2021: Atenas
- 2026–: Uruguay
- 2026–: Uruguay U20
Medal record
Men's football
Representing Uruguay
Copa América
Winner	2011 Argentina
Third place	2004 Peru
- * Club domestic league appearances and goals

Diego Martín Forlán Corazo (Note: Rioplatense Spanish pronunciation: [dje.ɣo maɾˈtin foɾˈlan ko.ɾaˈso]; Italian pronunciation: [forˈlan koˈrat.tso]) (born 19 May 1979) is a Uruguayan professional football manager and former player who is the head coach of the Uruguay national team and the Uruguay under-20 national team. Nicknamed "Cachavacha", (Note: "Cachavacha" is one of the antagonists from the Argentine cartoon series The Adventures of Hijitus; a witch known for her mischievous personality and magical antics. The nickname was introduced to Forlán by Julio César Toresani and Francisco Gabriel Guerrero, his mentors during his time with Independiente. For short, Forlán is also simply known as "Cacha.") Forlán is regarded as one of the best forwards of his generation, renowned for his tactical intelligence, playmaking abilities, and clinical finishing.

Born into a prominent football family, Forlán originally pursued tennis before transitioning to football, starting his career in his native Uruguay as a youth player for the Peñarol and Danubio academies, before joining Argentine club Independiente in 1997. After four successful years, he moved to Manchester United in 2001, where he won the Premier League and the FA Cup with the club. In 2004, he joined Villarreal, winning the Pichichi Trophy and European Golden Shoe with 25 goals in his first season with the club. After two more successful seasons with Villarreal, during which he won the UEFA Intertoto Cup and reached the semi-finals of the UEFA Champions League in the club's first-ever season in the tournament, Forlán later moved to Atlético Madrid in 2007, winning both awards again in 2009 with 32 goals, becoming the first player to win the Pichichi Trophy twice since Ronaldo in 1997 and 2004. With Atlético, he also won the UEFA Europa League, of which he scored the decisive goal in the final, and the UEFA Super Cup, both in 2010. In 2011, he joined Italian club Inter Milan, before moving to Internacional in Brazil the following year. After several spells in Japan with Cerezo Osaka, back in Uruguay with his boyhood club Peñarol, in India with Mumbai City and in Hong Kong with Kitchee, Forlán officially announced his retirement from professional football in 2019.

Forlán also had a distinguished international career with Uruguay, scoring 36 goals in 112 appearances across three FIFA World Cup (2002, 2010, 2014) and three Copa América (2004, 2007, 2011) tournaments. His most notable achievement came at the 2010 World Cup, where he scored five goals, helped Uruguay reach the semi-finals since 1970, and won several awards of the tournament, including the Golden Ball as the best player. (Note: Forlán was also the joint-top goalscorer (along with Thomas Müller, David Villa, and Wesley Sneijder), won Goal of the Tournament with his goal against Germany in the semi-finals, and was selected as part of the dream team.) In 2011, he helped Uruguay win the Copa América, its first international title since 1995, scoring twice in the final, and surpassing the national appearance record. (Note: Uruguay's match against Mexico in the group stages of the 2011 Copa América marked Forlán's 79th international cap, breaking the record held since 1986 by goalkeeper Rodolfo Rodríguez.) At the 2013 FIFA Confederations Cup, he became the first Uruguayan to earn 100 caps. He remained Uruguay’s all-time top scorer until Luis Suárez surpassed him two years later in 2013.

After retiring as a player, Forlán began his coaching career in Uruguay, managing Peñarol and Atenas in 2020 and 2021. He has also collaborated with FIFA in several ventures, having served as a tournament ambassador for the 2018 FIFA U-17 Women's World Cup, and since 2022, has served as an international ambassador for the FIFA Museum. Since July 2023, Forlán has continued his tennis career, competing in the ITF Masters tour, ranking in the 35+, 40+, and 45+ age categories, and played his first ATP event at the 2024 Uruguay Open in doubles with Federico Coria. In 2026, Forlán was appointed as the head coach of Uruguay for both their senior and under-20 teams after the dismissal of Marcelo Bielsa.

== Family ==
Forlán is of Basque, Irish, and Italian descent, and because of his Basque ancestry through his grandmother, a native of Gipuzkoa who immigrated to Uruguay when she was a teenager, Forlán was linked to Athletic Bilbao after his departure from Manchester United, even though the club only permits Basque players.

Coming from a family of professional footballers, Forlán is the son of Pablo Forlán (who played during several prolific years for Peñarol and São Paulo and represented the Uruguay national team at the 1966 and 1974 FIFA World Cups) and, through his mother, Pilar Corazzo, is the grandson of Juan Carlos Corazzo, known for his tenure with Independiente in Argentina. Forlán is also the nephew of Richard Forlán and is distantly related (on his mother's side) to Cristopher Fiermarin.

== Early life ==
Forlán was born on 19 May 1979 and raised in the neighborhood of Carrasco in the capital city of Montevideo. His family, which included three brothers, a sister, four cousins, his maternal grandmother and her sister, resided in an apartment building on Potosi street, a short distance from the Hotel Carrasco and the Rambla.

"Carrasco was something completely different from what it is today, nobody worried about security, there were almost no cars, we played a lot in the street, on the street, tennis, football, whatever you could think of."

— Diego Forlán in an interview with Old Boys Magazine, 2022

Forlán attended multiple schools in the private and state sector during his youth. He started at the Liceo Francés Jules Supervielle in Buceo, but later transferred to the Erwy School because it was closer to his home. This was followed by the Scuola Italiana di Montevideo and then Liceo 15 in Carrasco. He learned English at school from a young age. As a child, Forlán played tennis at the Carrasco Lawn Tennis Club, in addition to football, which often took place on the streets.

On 14 September 1991, Forlán's sister Alejandra was seriously injured and eventually left handicapped by a car accident that also killed her boyfriend. The cost of the medical bills plunged his family into financial crisis, though this was later averted due to the fundraising efforts of Diego Maradona. Until this point Forlán was also dedicated to tennis, but ultimately focused more on football, like his father and grandfather, in the hope that he might contribute to paying for his sister's treatment.

== Club career ==
=== Youth career ===
==== Peñarol/Danubio ====
Forlán was a boyhood fan of Peñarol and played for the youth academies for Peñarol and Danubio. In 1995, at 16 years old, Forlán moved to France where he spent four months on trial at Nancy Lorraine, but was ultimately not offered a contract by then-manager László Bölöni.

=== Professional career ===
==== Independiente ====
Forlán received an offer to join Argentine side Independiente through the help of one of his father's contacts, José Omar Pastoriza. He soon accepted, rejecting a simultaneous offer from Boca Juniors. Arriving in Argentina on 28 January 1998, Forlán made his way up the Independiente reserve teams and thanks to strong performances, started training with the first team. Injuries to several forward players who were ahead of him in the pecking order created an opportunity for the young Uruguayan, who made his professional debut on 26 October 1998 in a match against Argentinos Juniors.

Forlán scored 37 goals in 80 league games. His goalscoring attracted the attention of European sides, and in January 2002, Independiente agreed a £6.9 million deal with Middlesbrough of the Premier League; the transfer fee would be paid over 18 installments. Forlán travelled to England expecting to negotiate with Middlesbrough, but at the last minute Manchester United gazumped the Teesside club, offering Independiente the same fee in a single payment, as well as a more lucrative salary for Forlán. On arriving in England, he negotiated with United officials for four hours, then informed the press of his decision. "Manchester United is a big club, so I've decided to go there," he explained. "The thing is, they offered more money than Middlesbrough." He signed for United soon after.

==== Manchester United ====
Forlán was signed for Manchester United by Sir Alex Ferguson for £6.9 million on 22 January 2002. He made his debut on 29 January as a 76th-minute substitute for Ole Gunnar Solskjær in a 4–0 away win at Bolton Wanderers. He made his first start in 4–0 home victory over Tottenham Hotspur on 6 March. Forlán made 13 Premier League and five UEFA Champions League appearances in the 2001–02 season but did not score.

On 18 September 2002, Forlán came on as a 56th-minute substitute for Ryan Giggs in a Champions League match versus Maccabi Haifa. He scored his first United goal as an 89th-minute penalty kick in the 5–2 win. His first Premier League goal was a 77th-minute equaliser in a home 1–1 draw against Aston Villa on 26 October. In Forlán's next Premier League game, at home to Southampton on 2 November, he came on as a 79th-minute substitute for United's goalscorer Phil Neville with the score at 1–1, and scored the winner with a dipping shot over Southampton goalkeeper Antti Niemi in the 85th minute. The goal also became notable due to his goal celebration where he ripped off his jersey, but then struggled to put it back on as the game recommenced, with Forlán making a blocked tackle while shirtless.

On 1 December, Forlán scored his first brace for Manchester United with goals in the 64th and 67th minute of an away 2–1 Premier League win at rivals Liverpool. On 17 December 2002, Forlán scored the winning goal as United defeated Chelsea in the quarter-finals of the Football League Cup. On 18 January 2003, Forlán scored a 90th-minute winning goal to again defeat Chelsea, this time in a Premier League match. Manchester United went on to win the Premier League title in 2002–03, and Forlán scored six goals to make him the club's third best-scoring striker that season after Ruud van Nistelrooy and Ole Gunnar Solskjær.

At the start of the 2003–04 season, Forlán played seven Premier League games without scoring. This run was broken on 25 October, when he equalised the score to 1–1 in the 45th minute of a home match versus Fulham, a game which United lost 3–1. Forlán then scored a goal in his three subsequent matches in three different competitions, starting with an extra-time goal in an away League Cup game at Leeds United which Manchester United won 3–2. This was followed by the opener in a 3–0 home Premier League victory over Portsmouth and a sixth-minute goal in a win by the same score over Rangers in the Champions League. In his next Champions League game, he scored the 85th-minute winner for United over Panathinaikos in a 1–0 away victory. On 6 December 2003, Forlán scored two injury-time goals as Manchester United beat Aston Villa 4–0 at home in the Premier League. These were Forlán's last Premier League goals despite him playing 10 more league games over the season. His only other Manchester United goal was in a 3–0 victory over Northampton Town of Division Three on 24 January 2004 in the FA Cup. Forlán did not feature in United's 3–0 victory over Millwall in the 2004 FA Cup Final on 22 May 2004.

He started the 2004–05 season with Manchester United and played in a Champions League qualifier against Dinamo București and a 3–1 defeat to Arsenal on 8 August in the 2004 FA Community Shield. His last match for United was their first Premier League game that season, a 1–0 defeat away to Chelsea on 15 August.

United supporters would continue to sing Forlán's name in tribute to the two goals he scored against Liverpool for several years after Forlán's departure from the club, with the chant "He came from Uruguay, he made the scousers cry". Forlán spoke of this fondly in 2010.

==== Villarreal ====
Forlán was strongly linked with a move to Spanish clubs Levante and Athletic Bilbao, but on 21 August 2004, he signed with Villarreal. Forlán's debut for Villarreal was on 30 August 2004, starting away to rivals Valencia and scoring his club's goal in the 77th minute of a 2–1 defeat. His next goal came in a home 2–0 win over Real Zaragoza on 3 October, and was followed with an equaliser in a 1–1 draw at Mallorca and the final goal of a 4–0 win at home to Numancia. Between 12 December 2004 and 16 January 2005, Forlán scored seven goals in five Primera División matches, including a brace in a 3–0 home victory over Barcelona on 9 January. On 22 May 2005, he scored his first hat-trick for a European club with all of Villarreal's goals in a 3–3 away draw against eventual league champions Barcelona. A week later, he scored two in a 4–1 victory over local rivals Levante as Villarreal ended the season in third, qualifying for the Champions League for the first time in the club's history. Forlán won the 2004–05 Pichichi Trophy for most goals in La Liga, with 25. He also shared the 2005 European Golden Boot with Arsenal striker Thierry Henry.

His goal rate declined in the 2005–06 season as Villarreal underwent several changes, yet the club reached the semi-finals of the Champions League where they were knocked out by Arsenal.

In 2006–07, he ended the season with 19 goals in 36 league appearances.

==== Atlético Madrid ====
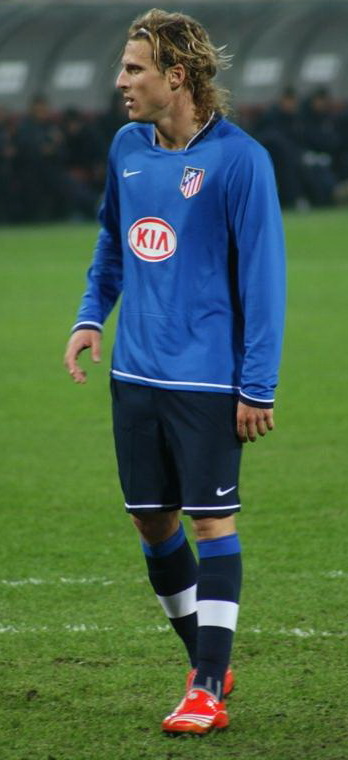
Forlán playing for Atlético Madrid in 2007

Forlán was linked with a transfer jointly with Juan Román Riquelme to Atlético Madrid in exchange for Luis Perea plus cash in June 2007. On 30 June 2007, following the departure of their captain Fernando Torres to Liverpool, Atlético Madrid confirmed that they had agreed to a fee of around €21 million. He returned to England in February 2008 to take part in Atlético's UEFA Cup clash against Bolton Wanderers (the club against whom he made his Manchester United debut), but the side lost out 1–0 on aggregate. In May 2008, Forlán helped Atlético qualify for the Champions League for the first time in over a decade, scoring the winning goal against Deportivo de La Coruña. He ended his first season in Madrid with 23 goals and formed a potent partnership with Argentinian striker Sergio Agüero.

On 9 May 2009, Forlán scored twice against Espanyol to help Atlético clinch Champions League qualification for a second successive year. Los Rojiblancos were trailing 2–0 at half-time and had seen Luis Perea sent off, but came back to win 3–2 thanks to a goal of the season contender from Forlán, as well as a last-minute winner. He also scored crucial goals in wins over Barcelona, Villarreal and Valencia. On 23 May 2009, Forlán scored a hat-trick against Athletic Bilbao, which helped him win the La Liga Pichichi Trophy, as well as the European Golden Boot for a second time. He ended the 2008–09 season with a very impressive 32 goals in 33 matches.

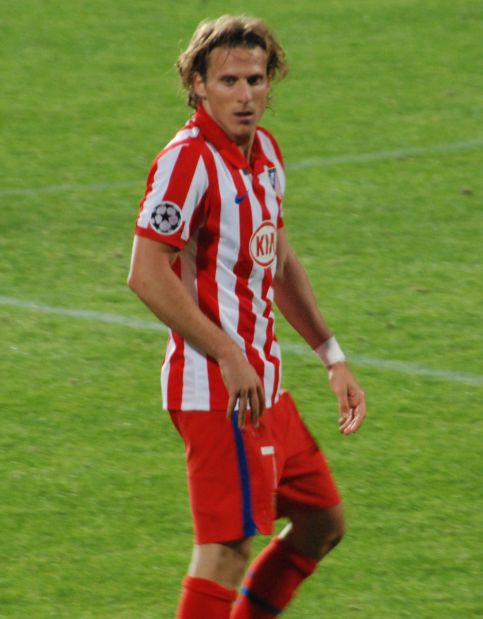
Forlán playing for Atlético Madrid in 2009

Forlán started the 2009–10 season slowly, and struggled for form as Atlético made their worst start to a league season since their relegation in 2000. On 24 October 2009, Forlán scored a penalty and missed another as Atlético were held to a 1–1 draw at home against Mallorca, who had played the majority of the second half with just nine players on the field. The disappointing result and performance led to protests from Atlético supporters, as well as criticism for Forlán, who was subsequently left out of the squad for the next game. Atlético started to improve after the arrival new manager Quique Sánchez Flores, and once again, Forlán flourished in the second half of the season, as Atlético reached the finals of both the Europa League and Copa del Rey. On 14 February 2010, Forlán scored the first goal as Atlético beat Barcelona 2–1 at the Vicente Calderón, inflicting the eventual Champions only league defeat of the season. On 22 April 2010, Forlán scored the only goal of the game in Atlético's Europa League semi-final first leg at home to Liverpool. A week later, Liverpool took the tie to extra time before taking a 2–1 aggregate lead. Forlán then scored again to make it 2–2 on aggregate, giving Atlético the away goal they needed to reach the final, in which they played against Fulham at Volksparkstadion, Hamburg, on 12 May. Forlán scored twice against Fulham in the final, in a 2–1 win and was awarded man of the match. He ended the season with a total of 28 goals, including six in Atlético's successful Europa League campaign.

The 2010–11 season began with another trophy for Forlán and Atlético, winning the UEFA Super Cup, beating Inter Milan 2–0 in Monaco on 27 August 2010. Again Forlán started the season slowly, and despite finding the net three times in the opening two league games, he then went 12 matches in all competitions without a goal before finally scoring a double in a 3–0 win against Osasuna on 13 November.

==== Inter Milan ====
On 29 August 2011, it was confirmed that Forlán had joined Inter Milan as a replacement for the departing Samuel Eto'o. No financial details were announced but it is believed the 32-year-old signed an initial two-year deal. He made his debut on 11 September 2011, scoring with a high left foot shot in a 4–3 defeat at Sicilian club Palermo. On 4 March 2012, Forlán scored his second goal for Inter against Catania in a 2–2 draw. In April, Forlán declared his loyalty to Inter and his intention to stay when he told Sky Sports: "I want to stay at Inter. You haven't seen the real Forlán yet... I wouldn't want to leave Inter like this. I like challenges and I wouldn't want to leave when the team are not in a good position." In June, his father confirmed the belief that the striker would see out his contract with the Nerazzurri. On 5 July, however, after only scoring twice in 22 appearances, the Italian club confirmed that he had been released, terminating the final year of his contract. Forlán has stated that his poor performance with the Nerazzuri was due to being played out of position. In addition, former Inter and Uruguay player Álvaro Recoba believed that his compatriot struggled at Inter due to the success of his predecessor Samuel Eto'o, which led Forlán to fail to live up to expectations.

==== Internacional ====
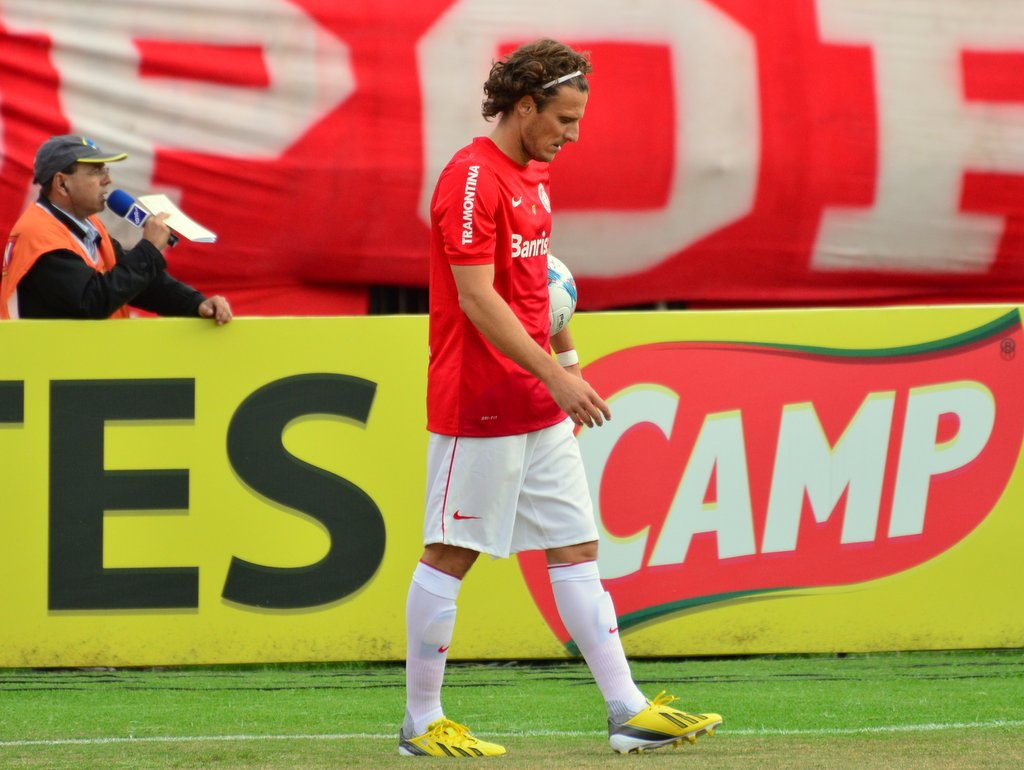
Forlán playing for Internacional in 2013

On 6 July 2012, after terminating his contract with Inter, Forlán signed a three-year deal with Brazilian club Internacional. He was also linked to Mexican teams Tigres UANL and Club América. In January 2013, Forlán was linked with another Mexican team, the recently promoted Club León. At León, Forlán had the chance to play the 2013 Copa Libertadores; Internacional, however, retained Forlán's services for the 2013 season.

On 28 July 2012, he made his debut for the Brazilian club against Vasco da Gama. Forlán scored his first two goals for Internacional in a 4–1 win against Flamengo. Forlán also helped the club win 2013 Campeonato Gaúcho, scoring nine goals, the highest total at the tournament.

==== Cerezo Osaka ====
On 22 January 2014, Forlán signed an 18-month deal with Japanese J1 League side Cerezo Osaka. He made his AFC Champions League debut in a 1–1 draw with Pohang Steelers, and his J. League debut in a 1–0 loss against defending champions Sanfrecce Hiroshima. He scored his first goal for Cerezo in a 4–0 win over Buriram United in an AFC Champions League match. On 12 April, Forlán scored two goals in the Osaka derby against local club rivals Gamba Osaka. He scored a crucial goal against Shandong Luneng on 23 April to put his team through to the knockout stage of the AFC Champions League. Cerezo Osaka were knocked out in the first round by Guangzhou Evergrande, losing 5–1 at home in the first leg. In spite of the disappointing home defeat, they managed to secure a 1–0 away win after an own goal by Liao Lisheng. However, this was not enough to overcome the 5–2 aggregate lead.

Having been relegated in his first season to J2 League, he started off the new campaign with a goal against Tokyo Verdy drawing 1–1. Forlán scored his first hat-trick against Kyoto Sanga on 29 April 2015, his side winning 3–0.

==== Peñarol ====
On 10 July 2015, Forlán signed an 18-month contract with his boyhood club Peñarol. In his only season at the club, he scored eight goals in 31 appearances as Peñarol won the championship title. On 14 June 2016 at a press conference, Forlán said he would be leaving the club.

==== Mumbai City ====
In August 2016, Forlán signed a three-month deal with Indian Super League club Mumbai City. He scored a hat-trick against Kerala Blasters in their 5–0 win on 19 November.

Mumbai finished first in the league table and progressed to the semi-final of the playoffs where they would face ATK. After conceding an early goal, Mumbai equalised and soon took the lead from the headers of Leo Costa and Gerson Vieira. In both cases the free kicks were taken by Forlán. Forlán received a red card in the second half as ATK won the match 3–2.

==== Kitchee ====
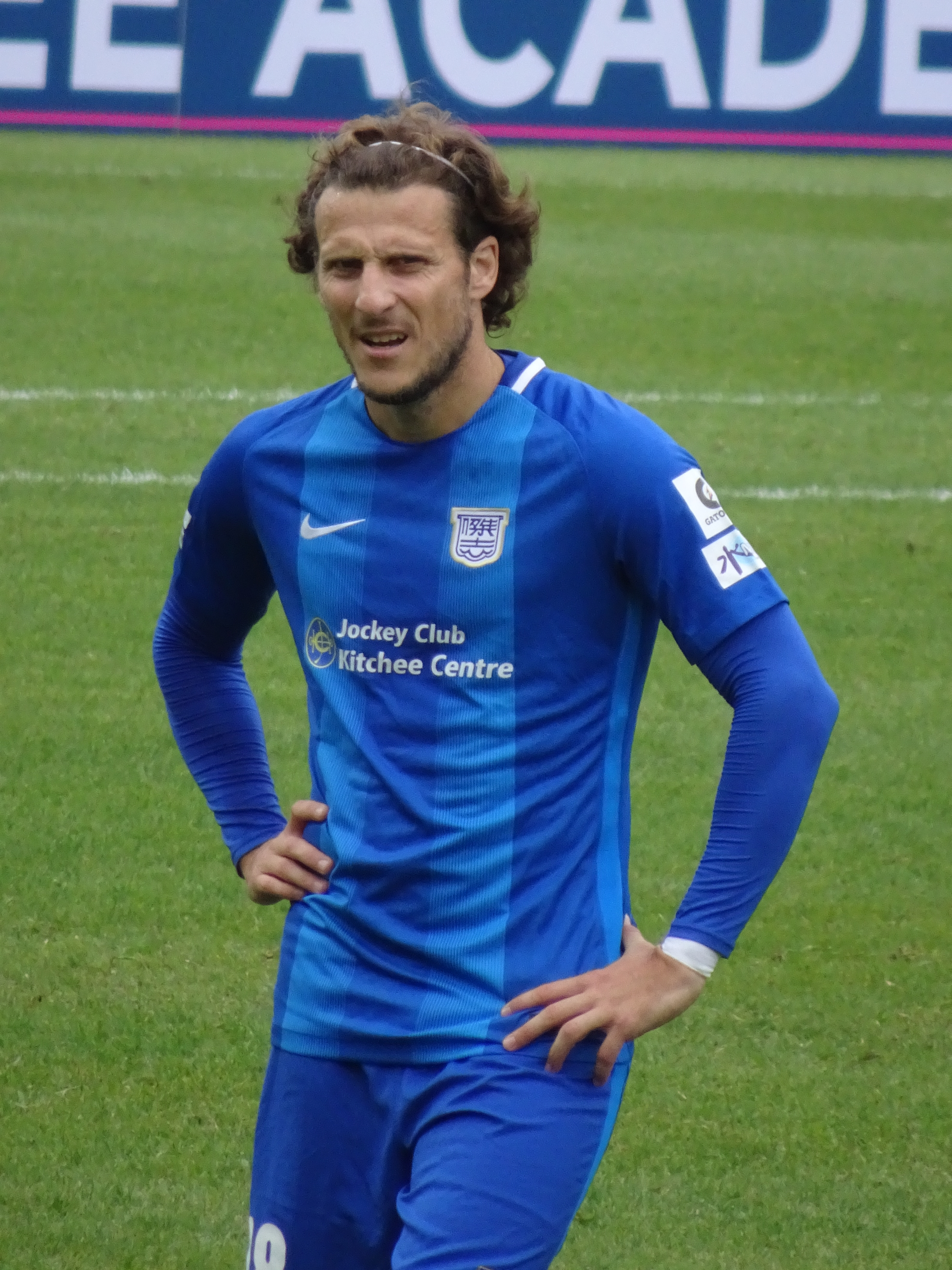
Forlán playing for Kitchee in 2018

On 4 January 2018, Forlán joined Hong Kong Premier League club Kitchee. He made his debut for Kitchee on 14 January 2018, coming off the bench in the 88th minute in a 2–2 draw against Southern. On 28 January, Forlán scored his first and second goals for Kitchee in a 7–0 victory over Biu Chun Rangers. He scored a hat-trick in a 5–1 win against Lee Man in the following match. Forlán played in Kitchee's 1–0 victory over Kashiwa Reysol in the 2018 AFC Champions League, helping Kitchee to become the first-ever team from Hong Kong to win a match in AFC Champions League history. On 13 May 2018, Forlán played his final match with the club, featuring in the first 56 minutes of a 2–0 victory, and went on to win the Hong Kong Premier League that season.

=== Retirement ===
A year after leaving Kitchee, Forlán announced his retirement from professional football on 7 August 2019.

== International career ==
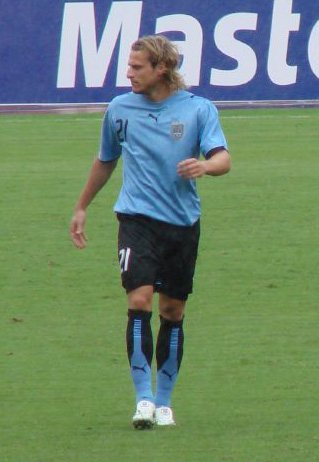
Forlán playing for Uruguay at the 2007 Copa América

Forlán's 100th cap came in the 2013 FIFA Confederations Cup match against Nigeria. On 11 October 2011, he scored his 32nd goal, which made him Uruguay's top scorer of all time in official matches, beating Héctor Scarone who had held the record alone with 31 goals since 1930. (Scarone scored 42 goals in total, but 11 of them were in unofficial matches).

=== 2002 FIFA World Cup, 2004 Copa América, and 2007 Copa América ===
Forlán debuted for the Uruguayan senior squad on 27 March 2002, scoring his first goal in a 3–2 friendly defeat against Saudi Arabia. During the 2002 World Cup, he scored a volley on 11 June in the group stage 3–3 draw against Senegal. Despite coming from three goals down to draw the game, Uruguay were eliminated from the tournament along with France in Group A. Forlán scored against Brazil in the 35th minute of the 2007 Copa América semi-final, but missed his shot during the subsequent penalty shoot-out, which Brazil eventually won 5–4.

=== 2010 FIFA World Cup ===
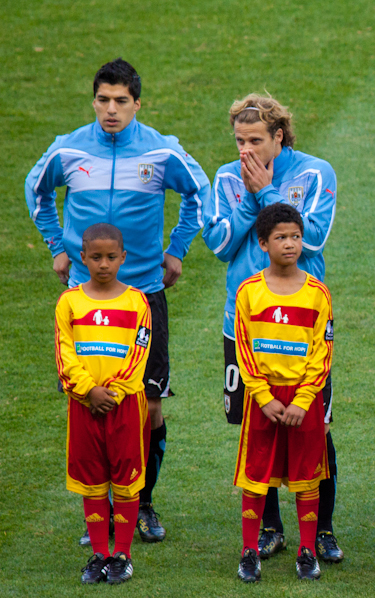
Forlán (right) with Luis Suárez at the 2010 FIFA World Cup

On 17 June 2008, Forlán scored a hat-trick in a World Cup qualifying game against Peru.

On 16 June 2010, during Uruguay's second group game in the 2010 World Cup against hosts South Africa, Forlán opened the scoring with a right footed long range effort. Later in the game, Forlán scored from the penalty spot, shooting high into the net for his second and also had a hand in Uruguay's third, in a 3–0 win over the host nation. On 2 July 2010, Forlán scored a free kick against Ghana to equalise in the quarter-final. The game ended 1–1 and Uruguay advanced to the semi-finals after defeating Ghana 4–2 in the penalty shootout. On 6 July 2010, Forlán scored another long range goal, this time with his left foot to equalise against the Netherlands in the semi-final. Despite a half-time score of 1–1, Uruguay eventually lost 3–2 as the Dutch advanced to the final. Forlán became the first player since Lothar Matthäus in 1990 to score three goals from outside the penalty area in one tournament. On 10 July 2010, Forlán scored for the final time in the tournament as he netted a well-executed volley from the edge of the area to give Uruguay the lead. This goal, from a pass by Egidio Arévalo Ríos, was selected by FIFA as the Goal of the Tournament. Forlán then hit the crossbar with the final kick of the game from a free kick as they lost to Germany 3–2 in the third place play-off. Forlán was awarded the Golden Ball as the tournament's best player. He was also picked for the team of the tournament, and was the joint top scorer at the World Cup with five goals.

=== 2011 Copa América ===
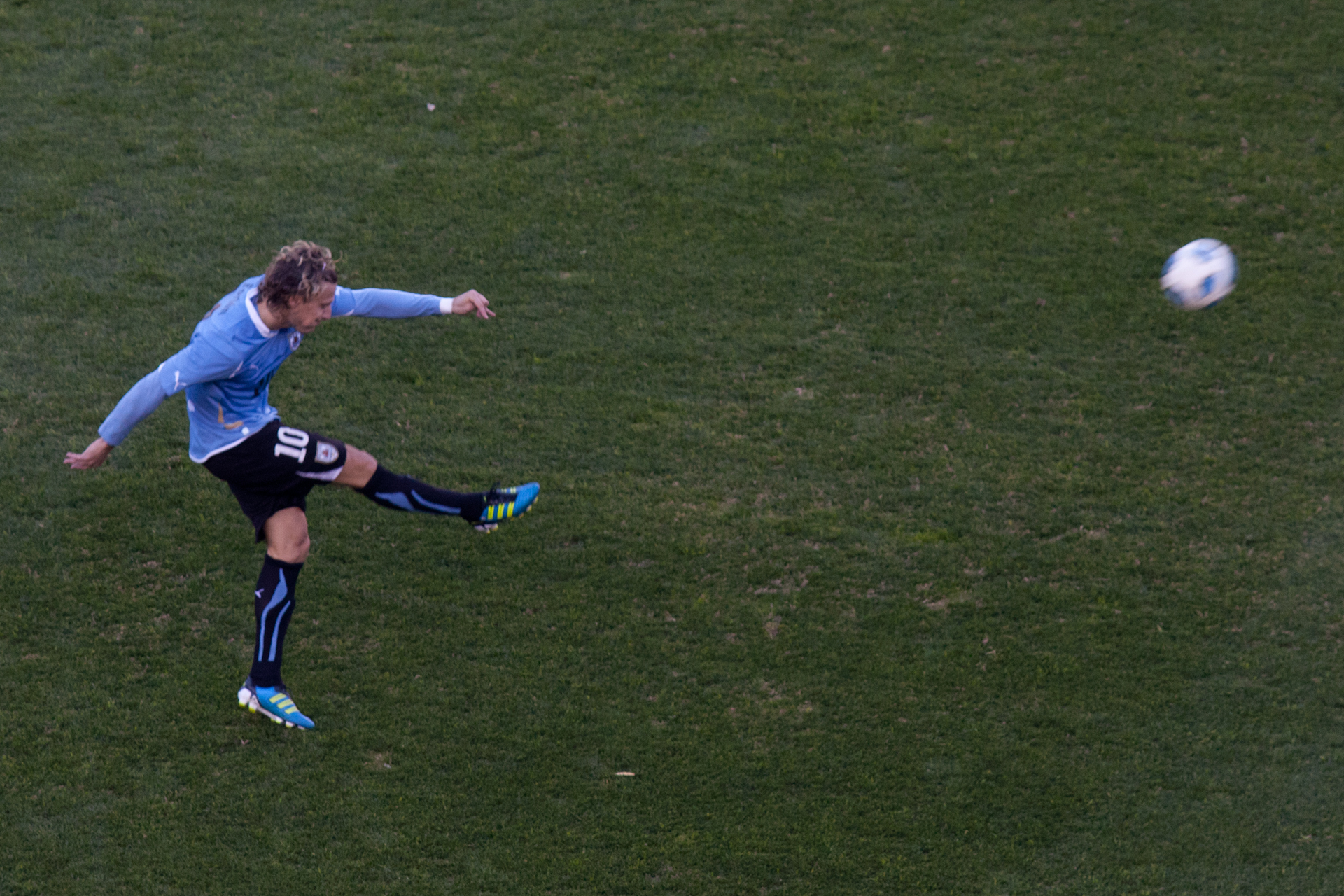
Forlán in action during the 2011 Copa América final

On 24 July 2011, Forlán scored twice after Luis Suárez's opening goal helping Uruguay win their 15th Copa América title and became Uruguay's joint top scorer at international level, his 31 goals matching those of Héctor Scarone after beating Paraguay 3–0 in the final. Forlán's father and grandfather were also South American champions with Uruguay over a period spanning the 95 years of the world's oldest active tournament.

=== 2013 FIFA Confederations Cup ===
On 16 June 2013, Forlán appeared as a 69th-minute substitute in Uruguay's opening 2013 Confederations Cup match against Spain. In Uruguay's second group game, a match where he won his 100th cap for his country, Forlán scored the winning goal to defeat Nigeria 2–1. He was subsequently rested for the next match against Tahiti. He was again in the starting line-up as Uruguay lost 1–2 to Brazil in the semi-final, where he had a penalty kick saved by Brazilian goalkeeper Júlio César.

=== 2014 FIFA World Cup ===
Forlán was a part of the Uruguay squad for the 2014 World Cup in Brazil. At the age of 35, he started the opening match against group underdogs Costa Rica in place of the absent Luis Suárez. He had a deflected shot saved by Costa Rican goalkeeper Keylor Navas as Uruguay lost the game 3–1. Forlán did not appear again until the Round of 16, where Uruguay were beaten 2–0 by Colombia.

=== Retirement ===
On 11 March 2015, Forlán announced his retirement from the national team. He represented Uruguay with 112 caps, scoring 36 times.

== Style of play ==
Forlán was a versatile forward, with a positional sense, who was capable of playing anywhere along the front line. He was deployed as a main striker (his preferred position), as a supporting forward, as an attacking midfielder, and even as a winger, often drifting onto the flank to begin attacking plays. He was capable of scoring with either foot, both from inside and outside the area; in fact, Forlán was known for his long range shots, which made him a threat if given space outside the box. Alongside this, Forlán was also an accurate set-piece and penalty kick taker. In addition to his finishing, movement, and goalscoring, Forlán's technique, ball control, and vision allowed him to be deployed in a creative role. He frequently dropped into deeper positions to link the midfield with the attack and provide assists. In addition to his footballing skills, Forlán was also praised for his leadership, throughout his career.

== Coaching career ==
On 20 December 2019, Forlán was appointed as manager of his former club Peñarol. He was sacked on 1 September 2020, after winning just four of his eleven games in charge. On 17 March 2021, he was appointed as manager of Atenas of the Uruguayan Segunda División. On 16 September 2021, after a 2–1 loss to Rampla Juniors, he was released.

=== Uruguay ===
On 6 August 2026, Forlán was appointed as the head coach of both the Uruguay national team and the Uruguay under-20 national team.

== Tennis career ==
Diego Forlán was a promising junior tennis player and has continued to play after his retirement from professional football in 2019. Since July 2023, he has been competing on the ITF Masters professional tennis tour, and is a ranked player in the 35+, 40+, and 45+ age categories. In June 2024, Forlán attracted media coverage after reaching the quarterfinals of the ITF MT1000 Lima 45+ tournament in Peru, winning three matches in straight sets.

At the age of 45, he was scheduled to play his first professional ATP tournament. He received a wildcard for the main doubles draw of the 2024 Uruguay Open in Montevideo, where his partner was Argentine Federico Coria. The pair were defeated in the first round of the tournament by the No. 4 seeds from Bolivia, Boris Arias and Federico Zeballos.

In October 2025, the 46-year-old suffered three broken ribs and a partially collapsed lung during a collision in an over-40s Liga Universitaria veterans' game for Old Boys, requiring hospital drainage but no ill intent from the opponent; he has since stabilized.

== Personal life ==
In addition to his native Spanish, Forlán is also well-versed in English and has working knowledge in Italian, having learned both languages in school during his youth, and Brazilian Portuguese. Forlán is ambidextrous, using his right hand for writing but uses his left hand when playing tennis. As a footballer, he was capable of passing and shooting with either foot.

Forlán is a founding member of Fundación Alejandra Forlán, an organization headed by his sister that promotes safer driving. In 2009, Forlán appeared in a music video for Coti starring alongside Argentine footballer Maxi Rodríguez. In 2021, Forlán began playing amateur football for the Old Boys Club, the alumni team of The British Schools of Montevideo.

=== Relationships ===
Forlán announced on 9 March 2011 on his official Twitter page that he and Argentinian model/actress Zaira Nara were engaged to be married. In June 2011, however, Forlán and Nara announced they were breaking their engagement. No reason was released for the breakup. Between 2011 and 2012, Forlán dated Uruguayan model/television personality Victoria Saravia. Forlán married Paz Cardoso in November 2013 and together, the pair have three sons and a daughter.

== Career statistics ==
=== Club ===
Appearances and goals by club, season and competition
Club	Season	League			National cup (Note: Includes FA Cup, Copa del Rey, Copa do Brasil, Emperor's Cup and Hong Kong FA Cup)		Continental (Note: Includes UEFA Champions League, UEFA Cup/UEFA Europa League, AFC Champions League and Copa Libertadores)		Other (Note: Includes Football League Cup, FA Community Shield, UEFA Super Cup, FIFA Club World Cup, Campeonato Gaúcho, Uruguayan Championship playoffs and Indian Super League playoffs)		Total	
Club	Season	Division	Apps	Goals	Apps	Goals	Apps	Goals	Apps	Goals	Apps	Goals
Independiente	1998–99	Argentine Primera División	2	0	—		0	0	—		2	0
Independiente	1999–2000	Argentine Primera División	24	7	—		0	0	—		24	7
Independiente	2000–01	Argentine Primera División	36	18	—		6	2	—		42	20
Independiente	2001–02	Argentine Primera División	18	12	—		5	1	—		23	13
Independiente	Total		80	37	—		11	3	—		91	40
Manchester United	2001–02	Premier League	13	0	0	0	5	0	0	0	18	0
Manchester United	2002–03	Premier League	25	6	2	0	13	1	5	2	45	9
Manchester United	2003–04	Premier League	24	4	2	1	4	2	2	1	32	8
Manchester United	2004–05	Premier League	1	0	0	0	1	0	1	0	3	0
Manchester United	Total		63	10	4	1	23	3	8	3	98	17
Villarreal	2004–05	La Liga	38	25	1	0	0	0	—		39	25
Villarreal	2005–06	La Liga	32	10	2	0	13	3	—		47	13
Villarreal	2006–07	La Liga	36	19	4	1	2	1	—		42	21
Villarreal	Total		106	54	7	1	15	4	—		128	59
Atlético Madrid	2007–08	La Liga	36	16	6	1	11	6	—		53	23
Atlético Madrid	2008–09	La Liga	33	32	3	1	9	2	—		45	35
Atlético Madrid	2009–10	La Liga	33	18	6	3	17	7	—		56	28
Atlético Madrid	2010–11	La Liga	32	8	3	1	6	1	1	0	42	10
Atlético Madrid	2011–12	La Liga	0	0	0	0	2	0	0	0	2	0
Atlético Madrid	Total		134	74	18	6	45	16	1	0	198	96
Inter Milan	2011–12	Serie A	18	2	0	0	2	0	—		20	2
Internacional	2012	Série A	19	5	0	0	—		—		19	5
Internacional	2013	Série A	15	5	8	3	—		13	9	36	17
Internacional	Total		34	10	8	3	—		13	9	55	22
Cerezo Osaka	2014	J1 League	26	7	2	0	6	2	—		34	9
Cerezo Osaka	2015	J2 League	16	10	0	0	—		—		16	10
Cerezo Osaka	Total		42	17	2	0	6	2	—		50	19
Peñarol	2015–16	Uruguayan Primera División	30	8	0	0	3	0	1	0	34	8
Mumbai City	2016	Indian Super League	11	5	—		—		1	0	12	5
Kitchee	2017–18	Hong Kong Premier League	7	5	2	1	5	0	0	0	14	6
Career total			525	222	41	12	110	28	24	12	700	274

=== International ===
Appearances and goals by national team and year
National team	Year	Apps	Goals
Uruguay	2002	5	2
Uruguay	2003	7	5
Uruguay	2004	11	2
Uruguay	2005	9	2
Uruguay	2006	3	0
Uruguay	2007	9	5
Uruguay	2008	7	3
Uruguay	2009	9	3
Uruguay	2010	11	7
Uruguay	2011	13	3
Uruguay	2012	9	1
Uruguay	2013	14	3
Uruguay	2014	5	0
Total		112	36

Scores and results list Uruguay's goal tally first.

List of international goals scored by Diego Forlán
No.	Date	Venue	Opponent	Score	Result	Competition
1	27 March 2002	Prince Mohamed bin Fahd Stadium, Damman, Saudi Arabia	Saudi Arabia	2–3	2–3	Friendly
2	11 June 2002	Suwon World Cup Stadium, Suwon, South Korea	Senegal	2–3	3–3	2002 FIFA World Cup
3	28 March 2003	National Stadium (Tokyo), Tokyo, Japan	Japan	1–0	2–2	Friendly
4	20 August 2003	Stadio Artemio Franchi, Florence, Italy	Argentina	1–0	2–3	Friendly
5	7 September 2003	Estadio Centenario, Montevideo, Uruguay	Bolivia	1–0	5–0	2006 FIFA World Cup qualification
6	19 November 2003	Pinheirão, Curitiba, Brazil	Brazil	1–2	3–3	2006 FIFA World Cup qualification
7	19 November 2003	Pinheirão, Curitiba, Brazil	Brazil	2–2	3–3	2006 FIFA World Cup qualification
8	1 June 2004	Estadio Centenario, Montevideo, Uruguay	Peru	1–3	1–3	2006 FIFA World Cup qualification
9	10 July 2004	Estadio Elías Aguirre, Chiclayo, Peru	Ecuador	1–0	2–1	2004 Copa América
10	30 March 2005	Estadio Centenario, Montevideo, Uruguay	Brazil	1–0	1–1	2006 FIFA World Cup qualification
11	4 June 2005	Estadio José Pachencho Romero, Maracaibo, Venezuela	Venezuela	1–0	1–1	2006 FIFA World Cup qualification
12	2 June 2007	Telstra Stadium, Sydney, Australia	Australia	1–1	2–1	Friendly
13	7 July 2007	Estadio Polideportivo de Pueblo Nuevo, San Cristóbal, Venezuela	Venezuela	1–0	4–1	2007 Copa América
14	7 July 2007	Estadio Polideportivo de Pueblo Nuevo, San Cristóbal, Venezuela	Venezuela	4–1	4–1	2007 Copa América
15	10 July 2007	Estadio José Pachencho Romero, Maracaibo, Venezuela	Brazil	1–1	2–2	2007 Copa América
16	13 October 2007	Estadio Centenario, Montevideo, Uruguay	Bolivia	2–0	5–0	2010 FIFA World Cup qualification
17	17 June 2008	Estadio Centenario, Montevideo, Uruguay	Peru	1–0	6–0	2010 FIFA World Cup qualification
18	17 June 2008	Estadio Centenario, Montevideo, Uruguay	Peru	2–0	6–0	2010 FIFA World Cup qualification
19	17 June 2008	Estadio Centenario, Montevideo, Uruguay	Peru	3–0	6–0	2010 FIFA World Cup qualification
20	28 March 2009	Estadio Centenario, Montevideo, Uruguay	Paraguay	1–0	2–0	2010 FIFA World Cup qualification
21	10 June 2009	Polideportivo Cachamay, Ciudad Guayana, Venezuela	Venezuela	2–1	2–2	2010 FIFA World Cup qualification
22	10 October 2009	Estadio Olímpico Atahualpa, Quito, Ecuador	Ecuador	2–1	2–1	2010 FIFA World Cup qualification
23	3 March 2010	AFG Arena, St. Gallen, Switzerland	Switzerland	1–1	3–1	Friendly
24	27 May 2010	Estadio Centenario, Montevideo, Uruguay	Israel	1–0	4–1	Friendly
25	16 June 2010	Loftus Versfeld Stadium, Pretoria, South Africa	South Africa	1–0	3–0	2010 FIFA World Cup
26	16 June 2010	Loftus Versfeld Stadium, Pretoria, South Africa	South Africa	2–0	3–0	2010 FIFA World Cup
27	2 July 2010	Soccer City, Johannesburg, South Africa	Ghana	1–1	1–1	2010 FIFA World Cup
28	6 July 2010	Cape Town Stadium, Cape Town, South Africa	Netherlands	1–1	2–3	2010 FIFA World Cup
29	10 July 2010	Nelson Mandela Bay Stadium, Port Elizabeth, South Africa	Germany	2–1	2–3	2010 FIFA World Cup
30	24 July 2011	Estadio Monumental Antonio Vespucio Liberti, Buenos Aires, Argentina	Paraguay	2–0	3–0	2011 Copa América
31	24 July 2011	Estadio Monumental Antonio Vespucio Liberti, Buenos Aires, Argentina	Paraguay	3–0	3–0	2011 Copa América
32	11 October 2011	Estadio Defensores del Chaco, Asunción, Paraguay	Paraguay	1–0	1–1	2014 FIFA World Cup qualification
33	2 June 2012	Estadio Centenario, Montevideo, Uruguay	Venezuela	1–0	1–1	2014 FIFA World Cup qualification
34	20 June 2013	Itaipava Arena Fonte Nova, Salvador, Brazil	Nigeria	2–1	2–1	2013 FIFA Confederations Cup
35	14 August 2013	Miyagi Stadium, Sendai, Japan	Japan	1–0	4–2	Friendly
36	14 August 2013	Miyagi Stadium, Sendai, Japan	Japan	2–0	4–2	Friendly

== Managerial statistics ==
As of match played 17 November 2026

Managerial record by team and tenure
Team	Nat	From	To	Record							
Team	Nat	From	To	G	W	D	L	GF	GA	GD	Win %
Peñarol	(Uruguay)	20 December 2019	31 August 2020	11	4	3	4	12	12	+0	36.36
Atenas	(Uruguay)	17 March 2021	16 September 2021	12	4	5	3	16	8	+8	33.33
Uruguay	(Uruguay)	6 August 2026	Present	5	4	0	1	18	6	+12	80.00
Uruguay U20	(Uruguay)	6 August 2026	Present	2	0	0	2	2	5	−3	0.00
Total				30	12	8	10	48	31	+17	40.00

== Honours ==
Manchester United

- Premier League: 2002–03
- FA Cup: 2003–04
- FA Community Shield: 2003

Villarreal

- UEFA Intertoto Cup: 2004

Atlético Madrid

- UEFA Europa League: 2009–10
- UEFA Super Cup: 2010

Internacional

- Campeonato Gaúcho: 2013

Peñarol

- Primera División: 2015–16

Kitchee

- Hong Kong Premier League: 2017–18
- Hong Kong FA Cup: 2017–18

Uruguay

- Copa América: 2011

Individual

- La Liga Ibero-American Player of the Year: 2004–05
- Pichichi Trophy: 2004–05, 2008–09
- European Golden Shoe: 2004–05, (Note: In 2004–05, Forlán shared the European Golden Shoe with Thierry Henry.) 2008–09
- UEFA La Liga Team of the Year: 2008–09
- UEFA Europa League Final Man of The Match: 2010
- FIFA World Cup Golden Ball: 2010
- FIFA World Cup Goal of the Tournament: 2010
- FIFA World Cup top goalscorer: 2010 (Note: Thomas Müller, David Villa, Wesley Sneijder and Diego Forlán each scored five goals in the 2010 FIFA World Cup. Müller won the Golden Boot by virtue of having more assists (three) than the rest (each had one). Villa won the Silver Boot due to having played fewer minutes than Sneijder, and Sneijder won the Bronze Boot due to having played fewer minutes than Forlán.)
- FIFA World Cup Dream Team: 2010
- Campeonato Gaúcho top goalscorer: 2013
- IFFHS Uruguayan Men's Dream Team (Team B)

Orders

- Officer's Cross of the Royal Order of Isabella the Catholic: 2011

== See also ==
- List of footballers with 100 or more caps
- List of FIFA World Cup top goalscorers
