= 2004–05 Villarreal CF season =

Villarreal
2004–05 season
- President: Fernando Roig
- Head coach: Manuel Pellegrini
- Stadium: El Madrigal
- La Liga: 3rd
- Copa del Rey: Round of 64
- UEFA Cup: Quarter-finals
- UEFA Intertoto Cup: Winners
- Top goalscorer: League: Diego Forlán (25); All: Diego Forlán (25)
| colours | colours |

The 2004–05 season was Villarreal Club de Fútbol's 82nd season in existence and the club's 5th consecutive season in the top flight of Spanish football. In addition to the domestic league, Villarreal participated in this season's editions of the Copa del Rey and the UEFA Intertoto Cup. The season covered the period from 1 July 2004 to 30 June 2005.

== Pre-season and friendlies ==
Win Draw Loss

| 19 August 2004 Friendly | Villarreal (Spain) | 3–3 | (Spain) Levante | Spain |

== Competitions ==
=== Overall record ===
| Competition | First match | Last match | Starting round | Final position | Record | | | | | | | |
| Competition | First match | Last match | Starting round | Final position | Pld | W | D | L | GF | GA | GD | Win % |
|---|---|---|---|---|---|---|---|---|---|---|---|---|
| La Liga | 30 August 2004 | 29 May 2005 | Matchday 1 | 3rd | 38 | 18 | 11 | 9 | 69 | 37 | +32 | 47.37 |
| Copa del Rey | 28 October 2004 | | Round of 64 | Round of 64 | 1 | 0 | 0 | 1 | 1 | 2 | −1 | 0.00 |
| UEFA Cup | 16 September 2004 | 14 April 2005 | First round | Quarter-finals | 12 | 6 | 5 | 1 | 19 | 6 | +13 | 50.00 |
| UEFA Intertoto Cup | 3 July 2004 | 24 August 2004 | Second round | Winners | 8 | 6 | 1 | 1 | 12 | 4 | +8 | 75.00 |
| Total | | | | | 59 | 30 | 17 | 12 | 101 | 49 | +52 | 50.85 |

Source: Competitions

=== La Liga ===
==== League table ====
| Pos | Team | Pld | W | D | L | GF | GA | GD | Pts | Qualification or relegation |
|---|---|---|---|---|---|---|---|---|---|---|
| 1 | Barcelona (C) | 38 | 25 | 9 | 4 | 73 | 29 | +44 | 84 | Qualification for the Champions League group stage |
| 2 | Real Madrid | 38 | 25 | 5 | 8 | 71 | 32 | +39 | 80 | Qualification for the Champions League group stage |
| 3 | Villarreal | 38 | 18 | 11 | 9 | 69 | 37 | +32 | 65 | Qualification for the Champions League third qualifying round |
| 4 | Real Betis | 38 | 16 | 14 | 8 | 62 | 50 | +12 | 62 | Qualification for the Champions League third qualifying round |
| 5 | Espanyol | 38 | 17 | 10 | 11 | 54 | 46 | +8 | 61 | Qualification for the UEFA Cup first round |

Source: LFP
Rules for classification: 1st points; 2nd head-to-head points; 3rd head-to-head goal difference; 4th head-to-head goals scored; 5th goal difference; 6th number of goals scored; 7th Fair-play points
(C) Champions

==== Results summary ====
| Overall | | | | | | | | Home | | | | | | Away | | | | | |
| Pld | W | D | L | GF | GA | GD | Pts | W | D | L | GF | GA | GD | W | D | L | GF | GA | GD |
|---|---|---|---|---|---|---|---|---|---|---|---|---|---|---|---|---|---|---|---|
| 38 | 18 | 11 | 9 | 69 | 37 | +32 | 65 | 14 | 4 | 1 | 41 | 10 | +31 | 4 | 7 | 8 | 28 | 27 | +1 |

Source: La Liga

==== Results by round ====
| Round | 1 | 2 | 3 | 4 | 5 | 6 | 7 | 8 | 9 | 10 | 11 | 12 | 13 | 14 | 15 | 16 | 17 | 18 | 19 | 20 | 21 | 22 | 23 | 24 | 25 | 26 | 27 | 28 | 29 | 30 | 31 | 32 | 33 | 34 | 35 | 36 | 37 | 38 |
|---|---|---|---|---|---|---|---|---|---|---|---|---|---|---|---|---|---|---|---|---|---|---|---|---|---|---|---|---|---|---|---|---|---|---|---|---|---|---|
| Ground | A | H | A | H | A | H | A | H | A | H | A | H | A | H | A | H | A | H | A | H | A | H | A | H | A | H | A | H | A | H | A | H | A | H | A | H | A | H |
| Result | L | D | D | D | L | W | D | W | D | W | L | L | L | D | W | W | D | W | W | W | W | W | L | W | L | W | D | W | L | W | D | D | L | W | W | W | D | W |
| Position | 15 | 14 | 15 | 16 | 17 | 12 | 13 | 12 | 12 | 9 | 12 | 13 | 15 | 14 | 12 | 10 | 10 | 8 | 7 | 7 | 6 | 5 | 7 | 5 | 7 | 4 | 4 | 3 | 4 | 3 | 4 | 4 | 5 | 4 | 4 | 3 | 3 | 3 |

Source: La Liga
A = Away; H = Home; W = Win; D = Draw; L = Loss

==== Matches ====
| 30 August 2004 1 | Valencia | 2–1 | Villarreal | Valencia |
| 21:00 CEST (UTC+2) | Marchena 26'; Baraja 38' | | Forlán 79' | Stadium: Mestalla; Attendance: 42,400; Referee: Rafael Ramírez Domínguez |

| 12 September 2004 2 | Villarreal | 0–0 | Real Sociedad | Villarreal |
| 19:30 CEST (UTC+2) | | | | Stadium: El Madrigal; Attendance: 17,000; Referee: Alfonso Pino Zamorano |

| 19 September 2004 3 | Racing Santander | 1–1 | Villarreal | Santander |
| 17:30 CEST (UTC+2) | Juanma 90+1' | | Anderson 60' | Stadium: El Sardinero; Attendance: 11,850; Referee: Alfonso Pino Zamorano |

| 22 September 2004 4 | Villarreal | 0–0 | Sevilla | Villarreal |
| 21:00 CEST (UTC+2) | | | | Stadium: El Madrigal; Attendance: 17,000; Referee: Fernando Teixeira Vitienes |

| 25 September 2004 5 | Atlético Madrid | 1–0 | Villarreal | Madrid |
| 18:00 CET (UTC+1) | Ballesta 42' | | | Stadium: Vicente Calderón; Attendance: 48,149; Referee: José Javier Losantos |

| 3 October 2004 6 | Villarreal | 2–0 | Zaragoza | Villarreal |
| CEST (UTC+2) | | | | Stadium: El Madrigal; Attendance: 15,000 |

| 17 October 2004 7 | Mallorca | 1–1 | Villarreal | Palma |
| CEST (UTC+2) | | | | Stadium: Son Moix; Attendance: 14,000 |

| 24 October 2004 8 | Villarreal | 4–0 | Numancia | Villarreal |
| CEST (UTC+2) | | | | Stadium: El Madrigal; Attendance: 17,000 |

| 31 October 2004 9 | Espanyol | 0–0 | Villarreal | Barcelona |
| CET (UTC+1) | | | | Stadium: Olímpic Lluís Companys; Attendance: 18,100 |

| 7 November 2004 10 | Villarreal | 3–0 | Osasuna | Villarreal |
| CET (UTC+1) | | | | Stadium: El Madrigal; Attendance: 16,000 |

| 13 November 2004 11 | Athletic Bilbao | 2–1 | Villarreal | Bilbao |
| CET (UTC+1) | | | | Stadium: San Mamés; Attendance: 30,000 |

| 20 November 2004 12 | Villarreal | 0–2 | Deportivo La Coruña | Villarreal |
| CET (UTC+1) | | | | Stadium: El Madrigal; Attendance: 16,000 |

| 28 November 2004 13 | Real Betis | 2–1 | Villarreal | Seville |
| CET (UTC+1) | | | | Stadium: Manuel Ruiz de Lopera; Attendance: 35,000 |

| 5 December 2004 14 | Villarreal | 0–0 | Real Madrid | Villarreal |
| CET (UTC+1) | | | | Stadium: El Madrigal; Attendance: 21,000 |

| 12 December 2004 15 | Getafe | 1–2 | Villarreal | Getafe |
| CET (UTC+1) | | | | Stadium: Coliseum Alfonso Pérez; Attendance: 12,000 |

| 19 December 2004 16 | Villarreal | 3–0 | Málaga | Villarreal |
| CET (UTC+1) | | | | Stadium: El Madrigal; Attendance: 16,000 |

| 22 December 2004 17 | Albacete | 2–2 | Villarreal | Albacete |
| CET (UTC+1) | | | | Stadium: Carlos Belmonte; Attendance: 10,000 |

| 9 January 2005 18 | Villarreal | 3–0 | Barcelona | Villarreal |
| CET (UTC+1) | | | | Stadium: El Madrigal; Attendance: 22,000 |

| 16 January 2005 19 | Levante | 2–4 | Villarreal | Valencia |
| CET (UTC+1) | | | | Stadium: Ciutat de València; Attendance: 16,000 |

| 23 January 2005 20 | Villarreal | 3–1 | Valencia | Villarreal |
| CET (UTC+1) | | | | Stadium: El Madrigal; Attendance: 20,000 |

| 30 January 2005 21 | Real Sociedad | 0–4 | Villarreal | San Sebastián |
| CET (UTC+1) | | | | Stadium: Anoeta Stadium; Attendance: 20,326 |

| 6 February 2005 22 | Villarreal | 2–1 | Racing Santander | Villarreal |
| CET (UTC+1) | | | | Stadium: El Madrigal; Attendance: 20,000 |

| 13 February 2005 23 | Sevilla | 2–1 | Villarreal | Seville |
| CET (UTC+1) | | | | Stadium: Ramón Sánchez Pizjuán; Attendance: 40,000 |

| 20 February 2005 24 | Villarreal | 3–2 | Atlético Madrid | Villarreal |
| CET (UTC+1) | | | | Stadium: El Madrigal; Attendance: 22,000 |

| 27 February 2005 25 | Zaragoza | 1–0 | Villarreal | Zaragoza |
| CET (UTC+1) | | | | Stadium: La Romareda; Attendance: 26,000 |

| 2 March 2005 26 | Villarreal | 2–1 | Mallorca | Villarreal |
| CET (UTC+1) | | | | Stadium: El Madrigal; Attendance: 18,000 |

| 6 March 2005 27 | Numancia | 1–1 | Villarreal | Soria |
| CET (UTC+1) | | | | Stadium: Los Pajaritos; Attendance: 10,000 |

| 13 March 2005 28 | Villarreal | 4–1 | Espanyol | Villarreal |
| CET (UTC+1) | | | | Stadium: El Madrigal; Attendance: 25,000 |

| 2 April 2005 30 | Villarreal | 3–1 | Athletic Bilbao | Villarreal |
| CEST (UTC+2) | | | | Stadium: El Madrigal; Attendance: 20,000 |

| 10 April 2005 31 | Deportivo La Coruña | 1–1 | Villarreal | A Coruña |
| CEST (UTC+2) | | | | Stadium: Riazor; Attendance: 22,000 |

| 17 April 2005 32 | Villarreal | 0–0 | Real Betis | Villarreal |
| CEST (UTC+2) | | | | Stadium: El Madrigal; Attendance: 21,000 |

| 23 April 2005 33 | Real Madrid | 2–1 | Villarreal | Madrid |
| 22:00 CEST (UTC+2) | Ronaldo 69'; Salgado 74' | | Riquelme 39' (pen.) | Stadium: Santiago Bernabéu; Attendance: 80,000; Referee: Bernardino González Vázquez |

| 28 April 2005 29 | Osasuna | 3–2 | Villarreal | Pamplona |
| 20:30 CEST (UTC+2) | Webó 40'; Ortiz 67'; Aloisi 89' | | Senna 7'; Sorín 73' | Stadium: El Sadar; Attendance: 15,000; Referee: Evaristo Puentes Leira |

| 1 May 2005 34 | Villarreal | 4–0 | Getafe | Villarreal |
| 17:00 CEST (UTC+2) | Sorín 14'; Forlán 18', 51'; Cazorla 46' | | | Stadium: El Madrigal; Attendance: 14,000; Referee: Alfonso Pino Zamorano |

| 8 May 2005 35 | Málaga | 0–2 | Villarreal | Málaga |
| 17:00 CEST (UTC+2) | | | Riquelme 63'; Cazorla 65' | Stadium: La Rosaleda; Attendance: 20,000; Referee: Carlos Megía Dávila |

| 15 May 2005 36 | Villarreal | 1–0 | Albacete | Villarreal |
| 17:00 CEST (UTC+2) | Riquelme 68' (pen.) | | | Stadium: El Madrigal; Attendance: 22,000; Referee: Julián Rodríguez Santiago |

| 22 May 2005 37 | Barcelona | 3–3 | Villarreal | Barcelona |
| 21:00 CEST (UTC+2) | Ronaldinho 33'; Belletti 36', 47' | | Forlán 16', 29' (pen.), 62' | Stadium: Camp Nou; Attendance: 84,537; Referee: Víctor José Esquinas Torres |

| 29 May 2005 38 | Villarreal | 4–1 | Levante | Villarreal |
| 21:00 CEST (UTC+2) | Josico 40'; Forlán 45', 87'; Pinillos 90' (pen.) | | Reggi 22' | Stadium: El Madrigal; Attendance: 21,000; Referee: Carlos Velasco Carballo |

=== Copa del Rey ===
| 28 October 2004 Round of 64 | Girona | 2–1 | Villarreal | Girona |
| CET (UTC+1) | | | | Stadium: Montilivi; Referee: Miguel Ángel Pérez Lasa |

=== UEFA Cup ===
==== First round ====
| 16 September 2004 First leg | Hammarby (Sweden) | 1–2 | (Spain) Villarreal | Stockholm, Sweden |
| 20:15 CEST (UTC+2) | Runström 24' | Report | Guayre 12'; Gonzalo 23' | Stadium: Råsunda Stadium; Referee: Dick van Egmond (Netherlands) |

| 30 September 2004 Second leg | Villarreal (Spain) | 3–0 (5–1 agg.) | (Sweden) Hammarby | Villarreal, Spain |
| 22:00 CEST (UTC+2) | Guayre 9'; Font 58'; Cazorla 86' | Report | | Stadium: El Madrigal; Referee: Mark Halsey (England) |

==== Group stage ====
| Pos | Team | Pld | W | D | L | GF | GA | GD | Pts | Qualification |
|---|---|---|---|---|---|---|---|---|---|---|
| 1 | (England) Middlesbrough | 4 | 3 | 0 | 1 | 6 | 2 | +4 | 9 | Advance to knockout stage |
| 2 | (Spain) Villarreal | 4 | 2 | 2 | 0 | 8 | 2 | +6 | 8 | Advance to knockout stage |
| 3 | (Serbia and Montenegro) Partizan | 4 | 1 | 2 | 1 | 7 | 6 | +1 | 5 | Advance to knockout stage |
| 4 | (Italy) Lazio | 4 | 0 | 3 | 1 | 5 | 7 | −2 | 3 | |
| 5 | (Greece) Egaleo | 4 | 0 | 1 | 3 | 2 | 11 | −9 | 1 | |

Source: RSSSF

| 21 October 2004 1 | Lazio (Italy) | 1–1 | (Spain) Villarreal | Rome, Italy |
| 21:00 CEST (UTC+2) | Rocchi 85' | Report | José Mari 4' | Stadium: Stadio Olimpico; Attendance: 23,000; Referee: Michael Weiner (Germany) |

| 25 November 2004 2 | Villarreal (Spain) | 2–0 | (England) Middlesbrough | Villarreal, Spain |
| 21:00 CET (UTC+1) | Guayre 36'; Javi Venta 75' | Report | | Stadium: El Madrigal; Attendance: 14,250; Referee: Jan Wegereef (Netherlands) |

| 2 December 2004 3 | Partizan (Serbia and Montenegro) | 1–1 | (Spain) Villarreal | Belgrade, Serbia and Montenegro |
| 20:45 CET (UTC+1) | Tomić 65' (pen.) | Report | Cazorla 17' | Stadium: Partizan Stadium; Attendance: 30,000; Referee: Nicolai Vollquartz (Denmark) |

| 15 December 2004 4 | Villarreal (Spain) | 4–0 | (Greece) Egaleo | Villarreal, Spain |
| 20:45 CET (UTC+1) | Font 13'; Guayre 39'; Venta 52'; Cazorla 63' | Report | | Stadium: El Madrigal; Attendance: 10,000; Referee: Mike McCurry (Scotland) |

==== Knockout phase ====
===== Round of 32 =====
| 17 February 2005 First leg | Dynamo Kyiv (Ukraine) | 0–0 | (Spain) Villarreal | Kyiv, Ukraine |
| 17:00 CET (UTC+1) | | Report | | Stadium: Valeriy Lobanovskyi Dynamo Stadium; Attendance: 12,000; Referee: Laurent Duhamel (France) |

| 24 February 2005 Second leg | Villarreal (Spain) | 2–0 (2–0 agg.) | (Ukraine) Dynamo Kyiv | Villarreal, Spain |
| 21:30 CET (UTC+1) | Figueroa 20'; Cazorla 31' | Report | | Stadium: El Madrigal; Attendance: 7,000; Referee: Matt Messias (England) |

===== Round of 16 =====
| 16 March 2005 First leg | Steaua București (Romania) | 0–0 | (Spain) Villarreal | Bucharest, Romania |
| 19:00 CET (UTC+1) | | Report | | Stadium: Stadionul Steaua; Attendance: 25,000; Referee: Massimo Busacca (Switzerland) |

| 20 March 2005 Second leg | Villarreal (Spain) | 2–0 (2–0 agg.) | (Romania) Steaua București | Villarreal, Spain |
| 20:00 CET (UTC+1) | José Mari 6'; Riquelme 62' (pen.) | Report | | Stadium: El Madrigal; Attendance: 20,000; Referee: Wolfgang Stark (Germany) |

==== Quarter-finals ====
| 7 April 2005 First leg | Villarreal (Spain) | 1–2 | (Netherlands) AZ | Villarreal, Spain |
| 20:45 CEST (UTC+2) | Riquelme 13' | Report | Landzaat 11'; Nelisse 74' | Stadium: El Madrigal; Attendance: 14,000; Referee: Konrad Plautz (Austria) |

| 14 April 2005 Second leg | AZ (Netherlands) | 1–1 (3–2 agg.) | (Spain) Villarreal | Alkmaar, Netherlands |
| 20:30 CEST (UTC+2) | Perez 8' | Report | Figueroa 72' | Stadium: Alkmaarderhout; Attendance: 8,700; Referee: Roberto Rosetti (Italy) |

=== UEFA Intertoto Cup ===
==== Second round ====
| 3 July 2004 First leg | Odense (Denmark) | 0–3 | (Spain) Villarreal | Odense, Denmark |
| 20:00 CEST (UTC+2) | | | Anderson 66'; Cazorla 69'; Guayre 87' | Stadium: Odense Atletikstadion; Attendance: 523; Referee: Mike Dean (England) |

| 10 July 2004 Second leg | Villarreal (Spain) | 2–0 (5–0 agg.) | (Denmark) Odense | Villarreal, Spain |
| 22:00 CEST (UTC+2) | José Mari 24'; Font 39' | | | Stadium: El Madrigal; Attendance: 4,000; Referee: Wolfgang Sowa (Austria) |

==== Third round ====
| 17 July 2004 First leg | Villarreal (Spain) | 1–0 | (Russia) Spartak Moscow | Villarreal, Spain |
| 22:00 CEST (UTC+2) | Anderson 51' | | | Stadium: El Madrigal; Attendance: 7,000; Referee: Matteo Trefoloni (Italy) |

| 24 July 2004 Second leg | Spartak Moscow (Russia) | 2–2 (2–3 agg.) | (Spain) Villarreal | Moscow, Russia |
| 17:00 CEST (UTC+2) | Pavlyuchenko 11', 36' | | Anderson 33'; Roger 53' | Stadium: Luzhniki Stadium; Attendance: 12,000; Referee: Craig Thomson (Scotland) |

==== Semi-finals ====
| 28 July 2004 First leg | Villarreal (Spain) | 1–0 | (Germany) Hamburg | Villarreal, Spain |
| 22:00 CEST (UTC+2) | Anderson 61' (pen.) | | | Stadium: El Madrigal; Attendance: 11,000; Referee: Johan Verbist (Belgium) |

| 4 August 2004 Second leg | Hamburg (Germany) | 0–1 (0–2 agg.) | (Spain) Villarreal | Hamburg, Germany |
| 20:15 CEST (UTC+2) | | | José Mari 69' | Stadium: AOL Arena; Attendance: 35,296; Referee: Ruud Bossen (Netherlands) |

==== Finals ====
| 10 August 2004 First leg | Villarreal (Spain) | 2–0 | (Spain) Atlético Madrid | Villarreal, Spain |
| 22:00 CEST (UTC+2) | Roger 56'; Rodríguez 77' | Report | | Stadium: Estadio El Madrigal; Attendance: 15,000; Referee: Bertrand Layec (France) |

| 24 August 2004 Second leg | Atlético Madrid (Spain) | 2–0 (a.e.t.) (2–2 agg.) (1–3 p) | (Spain) Villarreal | Madrid, Spain |
| 21:45 CEST (UTC+2) | Ibagaza 47'; García Calvo 58' | Report | | Stadium: Vicente Calderón; Attendance: 45,000; Referee: Vladimír Hriňák (Slovakia) |
| | Penalties |
| | García Calvo (penalty missed); Sergi (penalty scored); Nano (penalty missed); Arizmendi (penalty missed) | | (penalty scored) Anderson; (penalty scored) Víctor; (penalty scored) Riquelme |
