= 2024 Uruguay Open – Singles =

Singles
- 2024 Uruguay Open

Final
- Champion: (United States) Tristan Boyer
- Runner-up: (Bolivia) Hugo Dellien
- Score: 6–2, 6–4

Events
Singles	Doubles
- Uruguay Open

Facundo Díaz Acosta was the defending champion but chose not to defend his title.

Tristan Boyer won the title after defeating Hugo Dellien 6–2, 6–4 in the final.

== Seeds ==
1. (Argentina) Francisco Comesaña (first round, retired)
2. (Brazil) Thiago Monteiro (quarterfinals)
3. (Argentina) Federico Coria (semifinals)
4. (Argentina) Camilo Ugo Carabelli (semifinals)
5. (Bolivia) Hugo Dellien (final)
6. (Argentina) Román Andrés Burruchaga (first round)
7. (Argentina) Federico Agustín Gómez (first round)
8. (Argentina) Juan Manuel Cerúndolo (first round)

== Draw ==
Key

- Q = Qualifier
- WC = Wild card
- LL = Lucky loser
- Alt = Alternate
- ITF = ITF entry
- PR = Protected ranking
- SR = Special ranking
- SE = Special exempt
- JE = Junior exempt
- JR = Junior Accelerator Programme entrant
- CO = College Accelerator Programme entrant
- NG = Next Gen Accelerator Program entrant
- w/o = Walkover
- r = Retired
- d = Defaulted

=== Finals ===
Semifinals
5	(Bolivia) Hugo Dellien	6	6
3	(Argentina) Federico Coria	3	4
4	(Argentina) Camilo Ugo Carabelli	1	3
(United States) Tristan Boyer	6	6

Final
5	(Bolivia) Hugo Dellien	2	4
(United States) Tristan Boyer	6	6

=== Top half ===
First round
1	(Argentina) F Comesaña	6^{2}	0^{r}
(Argentina) JB Torres	7^{7}	0
(Brazil) F Meligeni Alves	6	6
(Ecuador) A Andrade	1	3
(Portugal) H Rocha	0	6	3
Q	(Brazil) O Luz	6	3	6
Q	(Argentina) LE Ambrogi	3	1
5	(Bolivia) H Dellien	6	6
3	(Argentina) F Coria	6	7^{7}
(Lithuania) V Gaubas	3	6^{0}
Q	(Argentina) L Midón	6	6
(Paraguay) AD Vallejo	3	4
LL	(Brazil) M Pucinelli de Almeida	2	0
(Argentina) A Collarini	6	6
(Brazil) G Heide	6	6
7	(Argentina) FA Gómez	0	2

Second round
(Argentina) JB Torres	5	0
(Brazil) F Meligeni Alves	7	6
Q	(Brazil) O Luz	3	6^{3}
5	(Bolivia) H Dellien	6	7^{7}
3	(Argentina) F Coria	6	3	6
Q	(Argentina) L Midón	1	6	4
(Argentina) A Collarini	6^{4}	5
(Brazil) G Heide	7^{7}	7

Quarterfinals
(Brazil) F Meligeni Alves	1	1
5	(Bolivia) H Dellien	6	6
3	(Argentina) F Coria	6	6
(Brazil) G Heide	3	1

Semifinals
5	(Bolivia) H Dellien	6	6
3	(Argentina) F Coria	3	4

=== Bottom half ===
First round
6	(Argentina) RA Burruchaga	0	2
WC	(Argentina) GA Olivieri	6	6
(Denmark) E Møller	6	6
(Spain) O Roca Batalla	4	1
Q	(Argentina) G Villanueva	1	3
(Bolivia) M Dellien	6	6
(Czech Republic) V Kopřiva	4	2
4	(Argentina) C Ugo Carabelli	6	6
8	(Argentina) JM Cerúndolo	4	4
(United States) T Boyer	6	6
WC	(Uruguay) F Roncadelli	3	5
Q	(Portugal) G Elias	6	7
(Ecuador) Á Guillén Meza	7	4	6^{4}
Q	(Brazil) M Alves	5	6	7^{7}
WC	(Uruguay) J Aguilar Cardozo	2	1
2	(Brazil) T Monteiro	6	6

Second round
WC	(Argentina) GA Olivieri	7^{7}	7^{7}
(Denmark) E Møller	6^{5}	6^{4}
(Bolivia) M Dellien	7^{7}	5	3
4	(Argentina) C Ugo Carabelli	6^{4}	7	6
(United States) T Boyer	7	7
Q	(Portugal) G Elias	5	5
Q	(Brazil) M Alves	5	3
2	(Brazil) T Monteiro	7	6

Quarterfinals
WC	(Argentina) GA Olivieri	2	2
4	(Argentina) C Ugo Carabelli	6	6
(United States) T Boyer	6	6
2	(Brazil) T Monteiro	3	4

Semifinals
4	(Argentina) C Ugo Carabelli	1	3
(United States) T Boyer	6	6
