= Alejandra Forlán =

Uruguayan orator, psychologist and activist

- Born: Alejandra Forlán Corazo; March 23, 1974 (age 52); Montevideo, Uruguay
- Education: University of the Balearic Islands
- Occupations: Psychologist, lecturer
- Parents: Pablo Forlán (father); Pilar Corazo (mother)
- Relatives: Diego Forlán (brother)

Alejandra Forlán Corazo (born March 1974) is a Uruguayan psychologist, lecturer, and activist.

== Biography ==
The daughter of Pilar Corazo and Pablo Forlán, and sister of footballer Diego Forlán, Alejandra studied psychology at the Catholic University of Uruguay. She earned a master's degree in consulting and human resources from the University of the Balearic Islands, working with adolescents. She obtained her diploma as the first female FIFA agent of Uruguay.

On 14 September 1991, at age 17, Alejandra Forlán and her boyfriend Gonzalo were in an automobile accident on a rainy morning. The young man was killed instantly in the collision; neither of them had a seatbelt on. After the impact, Forlán realized that she could not move her body. Her injuries caused irreversible damage, and after months of rehabilitation she remained paraplegic.

On 24 March 2009 she created the Alejandra Forlán Foundation, a nonprofit organization based in Montevideo, whose main objective is to promote and equalize the rights of people with different abilities, work on the prevention of traffic accidents, and create support networks for people with limitations. It has organized publicity campaigns promoting non-alcoholic drinks, charity golf tournaments, and The Road Show, an event featuring testimonies of people whose lives were changed by accidents.

From 2010 to 1 March 2015, Forlán was vice president of Uruguay's National Road Safety Unit (Unasev).

== Awards ==
- 2011 – International Women's Day Award from the Departmental Board of Montevideo for her contribution and input to society
- 2013 – Woman of the Year Award, for social volunteering
