= 2024 Uruguay Open – Doubles =

Doubles
- 2024 Uruguay Open

Final
- Champions: (Argentina) Guido Andreozzi (Brazil) Orlando Luz
- Runners-up: (Argentina) Mariano Kestelboim (Uruguay) Franco Roncadelli
- Score: 4–6, 6–3, [10–8]

Events
Singles	Doubles
- Uruguay Open

Guido Andreozzi and Guillermo Durán were the defending champions but only Andreozzi chose to defend his title, partnering Orlando Luz. Andreozzi successfully defended his title after defeating Mariano Kestelboim and Franco Roncadelli 4–6, 6–3, [10–8] in the final.

== Seeds ==
1. (Argentina) Guido Andreozzi / (Brazil) Orlando Luz (champions)
2. (Poland) Karol Drzewiecki / (Poland) Piotr Matuszewski (semifinals)
3. (Brazil) Fernando Romboli / (Brazil) Marcelo Zormann (semifinals)
4. (Bolivia) Boris Arias / (Bolivia) Federico Zeballos (quarterfinals)

== Draw ==
Key

- Q = Qualifier
- WC = Wild card
- LL = Lucky loser
- Alt = Alternate
- ITF = ITF entry
- PR = Protected ranking
- SR = Special ranking
- SE = Special exempt
- JE = Junior exempt
- JR = Junior Accelerator Programme entrant
- CO = College Accelerator Programme entrant
- NG = Next Gen Accelerator Program entrant
- w/o = Walkover
- r = Retired
- d = Defaulted

=== Draw ===
First round
1	(Argentina) G Andreozzi (Brazil) O Luz	2	6	[10]
WC	(Uruguay) Federico Aguilar Cardozo (Uruguay) J Aguilar Cardozo	6	1	[6]
(Argentina) F Ribero (Argentina) JB Torres	4	0
(Uruguay) I Carou (Bolivia) M Dellien	6	6
3	(Brazil) F Romboli (Brazil) M Zormann	7^{9}	4	[10]
(Brazil) L Britto (Peru) C Huertas del Pino	6^{7}	6	[6]
(United Kingdom) S Duncan (United States) H Reese	2	6^{1}
Alt	(Argentina) JM La Serna (Argentina) L Midón	6	7^{7}
(Argentina) M Kestelboim (Uruguay) F Roncadelli	6	6
(Argentina) JP Paz (Argentina) G Villanueva	2	2
WC	(Argentina) F Coria (Uruguay) D Forlán	1	2
4	(Bolivia) B Arias (Bolivia) F Zeballos	6	6
(United States) T Boyer (Argentina) A Collarini	4	4
(Argentina) FA Gómez (Venezuela) LD Martínez	6	6
(Spain) Í Cervantes (Spain) O Roca Batalla	3	2
2	(Poland) K Drzewiecki (Poland) P Matuszewski	6	6

Quarterfinals
1	(Argentina) G Andreozzi (Brazil) O Luz	6	6
(Uruguay) I Carou (Bolivia) M Dellien	4	2
3	(Brazil) F Romboli (Brazil) M Zormann	6	6
Alt	(Argentina) JM La Serna (Argentina) L Midón	4	3
(Argentina) M Kestelboim (Uruguay) F Roncadelli	3	7	[10]
4	(Bolivia) B Arias (Bolivia) F Zeballos	6	5	[6]
(Argentina) FA Gómez (Venezuela) LD Martínez	4	7	[5]
2	(Poland) K Drzewiecki (Poland) P Matuszewski	6	5	[10]

Semifinals
1	(Argentina) G Andreozzi (Brazil) O Luz	3	6	[10]
3	(Brazil) F Romboli (Brazil) M Zormann	6	4	[8]
(Argentina) M Kestelboim (Uruguay) F Roncadelli	7	6
2	(Poland) K Drzewiecki (Poland) P Matuszewski	5	4

Final
1	(Argentina) G Andreozzi (Brazil) O Luz	4	6	[10]
(Argentina) M Kestelboim (Uruguay) F Roncadelli	6	3	[8]
