= Javi Rubio (footballer, born 1984) =

Spanish footballer

Personal information
- Full name: José Javier Rubio Gómez
- Date of birth: 16 November 1984 (age 41)
- Place of birth: Torrent, Spain
- Height: 1.75 m (5 ft 9 in)
- Position: Midfielder

Youth career
- Valencia

Senior career*
Years	Team	Apps	(Gls)
2003–2004	Valencia B	2	(0)
2004–2006	Villarreal B		
2006	Villarreal	1	(0)
2006–2007	Portuense	26	(0)
2007–2008	Ontinyent	35	(5)
2008–2009	Murcia B	29	(0)
2009–2011	Ontinyent	61	(13)
2011–2012	Alavés	19	(2)
2012–2013	Huracán	35	(4)
2013–2016	Alcoyano	86	(12)
2016–2017	Saguntino	23	(1)
2017–2018	Castellón	38	(14)
2018–2020	Roda	33	(7)
- * Club domestic league appearances and goals as of 23 February 2020

José Javier 'Javi' Rubio Gómez (born 16 November 1984) is a Spanish former footballer who played as a midfielder.

== Club career ==
Born in Torrent, Valencia, Rubio graduated from local club Valencia CF, making his debut as a senior with the reserves in the 2003–04 season, in Tercera División. In the summer of 2004 he joined neighbouring Villarreal CF, initially being assigned to the B side also in the fourth division; he made his first and only La Liga appearance with the main squad on 22 April 2006, starting in a 0–2 home defeat against Real Sociedad.

The following six years, Rubio competed in Segunda División B, representing Racing Club Portuense, Ontinyent CF (two stints), Real Murcia Imperial, Deportivo Alavés, Huracán Valencia CF and CD Alcoyano.
