= Nino (footballer, born 1983) =

Spanish footballer

Personal information
- Full name: Constantino Ibarra Navarro
- Date of birth: 13 January 1983 (age 43)
- Place of birth: Baza, Spain
- Height: 1.92 m (6 ft 4 in)
- Position: Centre back

Youth career
- Baza

Senior career*
Years	Team	Apps	(Gls)
2002–2005	Baza		
2005–2009	Villarreal B	116	(6)
2009–2010	Ponferradina	13	(2)
2010–2011	Alcorcón	15	(0)
2011–2012	Melilla	24	(3)
2012–2014	Jaén	44	(2)
2014–2015	La Hoya Lorca	8	(0)
2015–2016	Baza	0	(0)
Total		220	(13)
- * Club domestic league appearances and goals

Constantino Ibarra Navarro (born 13 January 1983), commonly known as Nino, is a Spanish retired footballer who played as a central defender, and is the technical secretary of CD Ciudad de Baza.

== Club career ==
Born in Baza, Granada, Nino made his senior debuts with local CD Baza, then moved to Villarreal CF B in the 2005 summer. In July 2009 he signed with SD Ponferradina, but played just 13 games in his only season, which ended in promotion to Segunda División.

On 30 August 2010 Nino joined AD Alcorcón, in the second level. On 11 September he made his professional debut, in a 1–4 away defeat against UD Las Palmas.

In July 2011 Nino returned to Segunda División B, signing for UD Melilla. He joined Real Jaén for the following campaign, being a starter as the Andalusians promoted and returned to division two after 11 years.
