= Rodolfo Rodríguez =

Rodolfo Rodríguez may refer to:

- Rodolfo Rodríguez (Costa Rican footballer) (born 1980), Costa Rican midfielder
- Rodolfo Rodríguez (Uruguayan footballer) (born 1956), Uruguayan goalkeeper
