= 2024 Uruguay Open =

- Date: 11–17 November
- Edition: 19th
- Surface: Clay
- Location: Montevideo, Uruguay
- Venue: Carrasco Lawn Tennis Club

Champions

Singles
- (United States) Tristan Boyer

Doubles
- (Argentina) Guido Andreozzi / (Brazil) Orlando Luz
- Uruguay Open

The 2024 Uruguay Open was a professional tennis tournament played on red clay courts in Montevideo. It was the 19th edition of the tournament which was part of the 2024 ATP Challenger Tour. It took place at the Carrasco Lawn Tennis Club in Montevideo, Uruguay between 11 and 17 November 2024.

== Singles main-draw entrants ==
=== Seeds ===
Country	Player	Rank^{1}	Seed
ARG	Francisco Comesaña	99	1
BRA	Thiago Monteiro	100	2
ARG	Federico Coria	103	3
ARG	Camilo Ugo Carabelli	106	4
BOL	Hugo Dellien	125	5
ARG	Román Andrés Burruchaga	131	6
ARG	Federico Agustín Gómez	135	7
ARG	Juan Manuel Cerúndolo	143	8

- ^{1} Rankings are as of 4 November 2024.

=== Other entrants ===
The following players received wildcards into the singles main draw:

- (Uruguay) Joaquín Aguilar Cardozo
- (Argentina) Genaro Alberto Olivieri
- (Uruguay) Franco Roncadelli

The following players received entry from the qualifying draw:

- (Brazil) Mateus Alves
- (Argentina) Luciano Emanuel Ambrogi
- (Portugal) Gastão Elias
- (Brazil) Orlando Luz
- (Argentina) Lautaro Midón
- (Argentina) Gonzalo Villanueva

The following player received entry as a lucky loser:

- (Brazil) Matheus Pucinelli de Almeida

== Champions ==
=== Singles ===
- (United States) Tristan Boyer def. (Bolivia) Hugo Dellien 6–2, 6–4.

=== Doubles ===
- (Argentina) Guido Andreozzi / (Brazil) Orlando Luz def. (Argentina) Mariano Kestelboim / (Uruguay) Franco Roncadelli 4–6, 6–3, [10–8].
