= Antonio Guayre =

Spanish footballer (born 1980)

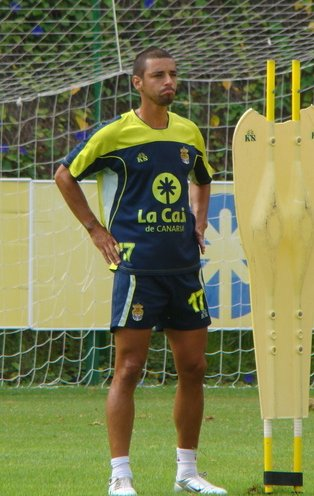
- Guayre training with Las Palmas in 2009

Personal information
- Full name: Antonio Guayre Betancor Perdomo
- Date of birth: 23 April 1980 (age 46)
- Place of birth: Las Palmas, Spain
- Height: 1.77 m (5 ft 10 in)
- Positions: Winger; forward

Youth career
- Las Palmas

Senior career*
Years	Team	Apps	(Gls)
1999–2000	Las Palmas B		
2000–2001	Las Palmas	31	(8)
2001–2006	Villarreal	137	(17)
2006–2008	Celta	20	(1)
2008–2009	Numancia	6	(0)
2009–2011	Las Palmas	28	(4)
2013	Lugo	2	(0)
Total		224	(30)

International career
2000–2001	Spain U21	9	(2)
2005	Spain	1	(0)
- * Club domestic league appearances and goals

Antonio Guayre Betancor Perdomo (born 23 April 1980), known as Guayre, is a Spanish former professional footballer. Comfortable in various attacking positions – mainly winger – his professional career was constantly hindered by injuries, and he played mainly for Villarreal after beginning with Las Palmas.

Over eight seasons, Guayre amassed La Liga totals of 184 matches and 26 goals.

== Club career ==
Guayre was born in Las Palmas. After emerging through hometown UD Las Palmas's academy he made his La Liga debut on 14 October 2000 in a 2–1 home win against Málaga CF, and would contribute greatly to the club's escape from relegation, only missing seven league games.

After that sole season, Guayre went on to represent Villarreal CF (where he would become an important attacking figure in the team's domestic and European consolidation, although never an undisputed starter) and RC Celta de Vigo. Whilst with the former, he scored one goal in each of their UEFA Intertoto Cup victorious campaigns.

After two injury-ravaged seasons with Celta, Guayre returned to the top division, joining CD Numancia in August 2008. Again troubled by injuries, his maiden appearance for the Sorians took place on 11 January 2009, when he came from the bench in a 2–0 home victory over Getafe CF; he was released from contract at the end of the season.

In July 2009, Guayre returned to his first professional club, reuniting with the coach who gave him his top-flight debut, Sergije Krešić, and players Jorge Larena – another youth product of Las Palmas – and Josico. In his first year he continued to be constantly bothered by physical problems, playing less than one half of the matches; the Canary Islands side also finished in 17th position, just one point above the relegation zone.

Guayre returned to active in January 2013 after more than one year out of football, signing with Segunda División team CD Lugo following a two-month trial. He retired for good in April, aged 33.

== International career ==
Guayre won his sole cap for Spain on 9 February 2005, featuring 15 minutes in a 2006 FIFA World Cup qualifier 5–0 defeat of San Marino in Almería.

== Honours ==
Villarreal

- UEFA Intertoto Cup: 2003, 2004
