= 2021 Vesuvio Cup – Doubles =

Doubles
- 2021 Vesuvio Cup

Final
- Champions: (Italy) Marco Bortolotti (Spain) Sergio Martos Gornés
- Runners-up: (Germany) Dustin Brown (Italy) Andrea Vavassori
- Score: 6–4, 3–6, [10–7]

Events
Singles	Doubles
- Vesuvio Cup

This was the first edition of the tournament.

Marco Bortolotti and Sergio Martos Gornés won the title after defeating Dustin Brown and Andrea Vavassori 6–4, 3–6, [10–7] in the final.

== Seeds ==
1. (Finland) Harri Heliövaara / (Czech Republic) Roman Jebavý (quarterfinals)
2. (Germany) Dustin Brown / (Italy) Andrea Vavassori (final)
3. (France) Sadio Doumbia / (France) Fabien Reboul (semifinals)
4. (Italy) Marco Bortolotti / (Spain) Sergio Martos Gornés (champions)

== Draw ==
Key

- Q = Qualifier
- WC = Wild card
- LL = Lucky loser
- Alt = Alternate
- ITF = ITF entry
- PR = Protected ranking
- SR = Special ranking
- SE = Special exempt
- JE = Junior exempt
- JR = Junior Accelerator Programme entrant
- CO = College Accelerator Programme entrant
- NG = Next Gen Accelerator Program entrant
- w/o = Walkover
- r = Retired
- d = Defaulted

First round
1	(Finland) H Heliövaara (Czech Republic) R Jebavý	7^{7}	6
WC	(Italy) J Berrettini (Italy) M Gigante	6^{3}	4
(Netherlands) M Hermans (Netherlands) G Smits	3	6^{6}
(United Kingdom) J Clarke (India) A Kadhe	6	7^{8}
4	(Italy) M Bortolotti (Spain) S Martos Gornés	6	6
WC	(Italy) Filippo Palumbo (Italy) A Pellegrino	2	3
(India) A Chandrasekar (India) VS Prashanth	3	4
(Italy) R Brancaccio (Italy) F Cobolli	6	6
(Italy) F Baldi (Switzerland) L Margaroli	1	1
(Slovakia) A Martin (Austria) T-S Weissborn	6	6
(Spain) J Barranco Cosano (Spain) Á López San Martín	1	6^{4}
3	(France) S Doumbia (France) F Reboul	6	7^{7}
(Italy) F Agamenone (Switzerland) M-A Hüsler	3	7	[10]
(France) E Furness (Romania) FC Jianu	6	5	[3]
WC	(Italy) Raffaele Barba (Italy) Giovanni Cozzolino	2	0
2	(Germany) D Brown (Italy) A Vavassori	6	6

Quarterfinals
1	(Finland) H Heliövaara (Czech Republic) R Jebavý	3	4
(United Kingdom) J Clarke (India) A Kadhe	6	6
4	(Italy) M Bortolotti (Spain) S Martos Gornés	6	5	[10]
(Italy) R Brancaccio (Italy) F Cobolli	4	7	[8]
(Slovakia) A Martin (Austria) T-S Weissborn	6^{4}	3
3	(France) S Doumbia (France) F Reboul	7^{7}	6
(Italy) F Agamenone (Switzerland) M-A Hüsler	7^{7}	6^{5}	[2]
2	(Germany) D Brown (Italy) A Vavassori	6^{4}	7^{7}	[10]

Semifinals
(United Kingdom) J Clarke (India) A Kadhe	6^{3}	2
4	(Italy) M Bortolotti (Spain) S Martos Gornés	7^{7}	6
3	(France) S Doumbia (France) F Reboul	4	2
2	(Germany) D Brown (Italy) A Vavassori	6	6

Final
4	(Italy) M Bortolotti (Spain) S Martos Gornés	6	3	[10]
2	(Germany) D Brown (Italy) A Vavassori	4	6	[7]
