= 2024 Dubai Tennis Championships =

- Date: 18–24 February (women); 26 February – 2 March (men)
- Edition: 32nd (men) / 24th (women)
- Category: ATP Tour 500 (men); WTA 1000 (women)
- Draw: 32S / 16D (men); 56S / 28D (women)
- Prize money: $2,941,785 (men) $3,211,715 (women)
- Surface: Hard, Outdoor
- Location: Dubai, United Arab Emirates
- Venue: Aviation Club Tennis Centre

Champions

Men's singles
- (France) Ugo Humbert

Women's singles
- (Italy) Jasmine Paolini

Men's doubles
- (Netherlands) Tallon Griekspoor / (Germany) Jan-Lennard Struff

Women's doubles
- (Australia) Storm Hunter / (Czech Republic) Kateřina Siniaková
- Dubai Tennis Championships

The 2024 Dubai Tennis Championships (also known as the Dubai Duty Free Tennis Championships for sponsorship reasons) was a professional ATP 500 event on the 2024 ATP Tour and a WTA 1000 tournament on the 2024 WTA Tour. Both events took place at the Aviation Club Tennis Centre in Dubai, United Arab Emirates. The women's tournament took place from February 18 to 24, and the men's tournament from February 26 to March 2.

== Champions ==
=== Men's singles ===
- (France) Ugo Humbert def. (Kazakhstan) Alexander Bublik, 6–4, 6–3

=== Women's singles ===
- (Italy) Jasmine Paolini def. Anna Kalinskaya, 4–6, 7–5, 7–5

=== Men's doubles ===
- (Netherlands) Tallon Griekspoor / (Germany) Jan-Lennard Struff def. (Croatia) Ivan Dodig / (United States) Austin Krajicek, 6–4, 4–6, [10–6]

=== Women's doubles ===
- (Australia) Storm Hunter / (Czech Republic) Kateřina Siniaková def. (United States) Nicole Melichar-Martinez / (Australia) Ellen Perez, 6–4, 6–2

== Points and prize money ==
=== Point distribution ===
Event	W	F	SF	QF	Round of 16	Round of 32	Round of 56	Q	Q2	Q1
Men's singles	500	330	200	100	50	0	—N/a	25	13	0
Men's doubles	500	330	200	100	0	—N/a	—N/a	45	25	0
Women's singles	1000	650	390	215	120	65	10	30	20	2
Women's doubles	1000	650	390	215	120	1	—N/a	—N/a	—N/a	—N/a

=== Prize money ===
Event	W	F	SF	QF	Round of 16	Round of 32	Round of 56	Q2	Q1
Men's singles	$550,140	$296,000	$157,755	$80,600	$43,025	$22,945	—N/a	$11,760	$6,595
Men's doubles*	$180,700	$96,370	$48,760	$24,380	$12,620	—N/a	—N/a	—N/a	—N/a
Women's singles	$454,500	$267,690	$138,000	$63,350	$31,650	$17,930	$12,848	$7,650	$4,000
Women's doubles*	$148,845	$75,310	$37,275	$18,765	$9,510	$4,695	—N/a	—N/a	—N/a
Doubles prize money per team

== ATP singles main-draw entrants ==
=== Seeds ===
Country	Player	Rank^{1}	Seed
	Daniil Medvedev	4	1
	Andrey Rublev	5	2
POL	Hubert Hurkacz	8	3
	Karen Khachanov	17	4
FRA	Ugo Humbert	18	5
FRA	Adrian Mannarino	20	6
KAZ	Alexander Bublik	21	7
ESP	Alejandro Davidovich Fokina	24	8

- Rankings are as of 19 February 2024.

=== Other entrants ===
The following players received wildcards into the singles main draw:

- (France) Gaël Monfils
- (India) Sumit Nagal
- (Jordan) Abdullah Shelbayh

The following player received entry into the main draw through a protected ranking:

- ~~(Canada) Milos Raonic~~
- (Canada) Denis Shapovalov

The following player received entry as a special exempt:

- (Czech Republic) Jakub Menšík

The following players received entry from the qualifying draw:

- (France) Arthur Cazaux
- (Hungary) Márton Fucsovics
- (Czech Republic) Tomáš Macháč
- (Germany) Maximilian Marterer

The following player received entry as a lucky loser:

- (France) Luca Van Assche

=== Withdrawals ===
- (Australia) Alexei Popyrin → replaced by (France) Luca Van Assche
- (Canada) Milos Raonic → replaced by (Netherlands) Botic van de Zandschulp

== ATP doubles main-draw entrants ==
=== Seeds ===
Country	Player	Country	Player	Rank^{1}	Seed
IND	Rohan Bopanna	AUS	Matthew Ebden	3	1
CRO	Ivan Dodig	USA	Austin Krajicek	10	2
GBR	Jamie Murray	NZL	Michael Venus	37	3
NED	Wesley Koolhof	CRO	Nikola Mektić	38	4

- Rankings are as of 19 February 2024

=== Other entrants ===
The following pairs received wildcards into the doubles main draw:

- (Republic of Ireland) Michael Agwi / (Republic of Ireland) Osgar O'Hoisin
- (Tunisia) Skander Mansouri / (Pakistan) Aisam-ul-Haq Qureshi

The following pair received entry from the qualifying draw:

- (India) Yuki Bhambri / (Netherlands) Robin Haase

The following pair received entry as lucky losers:

- (Germany) Andreas Mies / (Australia) John-Patrick Smith

=== Withdrawals ===
- (El Salvador) Marcelo Arévalo / (Croatia) Mate Pavić → replaced by (Germany) Andreas Mies / (Australia) John-Patrick Smith
- Karen Khachanov / Andrey Rublev → replaced by (Uruguay) Ariel Behar / (Czech Republic) Adam Pavlásek

== WTA singles main-draw entrants ==
=== Seeds ===
Country	Player	Ranking^{1}	Seed
POL	Iga Świątek	1	1
	Aryna Sabalenka	2	2
USA	Coco Gauff	3	3
KAZ	Elena Rybakina	4	4
~~TUN~~	~~Ons Jabeur~~	~~6~~	~~5~~
CHN	Zheng Qinwen	7	6
CZE	Markéta Vondroušová	8	7
GRE	Maria Sakkari	9	8
LAT	Jeļena Ostapenko	11	9
	Daria Kasatkina	13	10
BRA	Beatriz Haddad Maia	14	11
	Liudmila Samsonova	15	12
	Veronika Kudermetova	18	13
	Ekaterina Alexandrova	19	14
UKR	Elina Svitolina	20	15
FRA	Caroline Garcia	21	16

- Rankings are as of 12 February 2024.

=== Other entrants ===
The following players received wildcards into the singles main draw:

- (United States) Ashlyn Krueger
- (Switzerland) Lulu Sun
- (Ukraine) Dayana Yastremska
- (China) Zhang Shuai

The following player received entry into the main draw through a protected ranking:

- (Spain) Paula Badosa

The following players received entry from the qualifying draw:

- (France) Clara Burel
- (Poland) Magdalena Fręch
- (Japan) Nao Hibino
- (Australia) Storm Hunter
- Anna Kalinskaya
- (United States) Bernarda Pera
- (Bulgaria) Viktoriya Tomova
- (China) Wang Xiyu

The following players received entry as lucky losers:

- (Italy) Lucia Bronzetti
- (Spain) Cristina Bucșa
- (Italy) Elisabetta Cocciaretto

=== Withdrawals ===
- (Tunisia) Ons Jabeur → replaced by (Spain) Cristina Bucșa
- (Germany) Angelique Kerber → replaced by Anastasia Pavlyuchenkova
- (Ukraine) Marta Kostyuk → replaced by (Italy) Lucia Bronzetti
- (Czech Republic) Barbora Krejčíková → replaced by (United States) Peyton Stearns
- (Czech Republic) Karolína Muchová → replaced by Mirra Andreeva
- (United States) Jessica Pegula → replaced by (Netherlands) Arantxa Rus
- (Ukraine) Lesia Tsurenko → replaced by (Italy) Elisabetta Cocciaretto

== WTA doubles main-draw entrants ==
=== Seeds ===
Country	Player	Country	Player	Rank^{1}	Seed
TPE	Hsieh Su-wei	BEL	Elise Mertens	3	1
CAN	Gabriela Dabrowski	NZL	Erin Routliffe	11	2
USA	Nicole Melichar-Martinez	AUS	Ellen Perez	23	3
AUS	Storm Hunter	CZE	Kateřina Siniaková	24	4
NED	Demi Schuurs	BRA	Luisa Stefani	30	5
UKR	Lyudmyla Kichenok	LAT	Jeļena Ostapenko	32	6
TPE	Chan Hao-ching	MEX	Giuliana Olmos	50	7
USA	Caroline Dolehide	USA	Desirae Krawczyk	54	8

- Rankings are as of 12 February 2024.

=== Other entrants ===
The following pairs received wildcards into the doubles main draw:

- (France) Caroline Garcia / (France) Kristina Mladenovic
- (United Kingdom) Sarah Beth Grey / (United Kingdom) Eden Silva
- (India) Ankita Raina / (India) Prarthana Thombare
