= 2026 Dubai Tennis Championships =

Tennis tournament

- Date: 15–21 February (women); 23–28 February (men)
- Edition: 34th (men) / 26th (women)
- Category: ATP 500 (men); WTA 1000 (women)
- Draw: 32S / 16D / 16Q (men); 56S / 28D / 32Q (women)
- Prize money: $3,311,005 (men) $4,088,211 (women)
- Surface: Hard, Outdoor
- Location: Dubai, United Arab Emirates
- Venue: Aviation Club Tennis Centre

Champions

Men's singles
- Daniil Medvedev

Women's singles
- (United States) Jessica Pegula

Men's doubles
- (Finland) Harri Heliövaara / (United Kingdom) Henry Patten

Women's doubles
- (Canada) Gabriela Dabrowski / (Brazil) Luisa Stefani
- Dubai Tennis Championships

The 2026 Dubai Tennis Championships (also known as the Dubai Duty Free Tennis Championships for sponsorship reasons) was a professional ATP 500 event on the 2026 ATP Tour and a WTA 1000 tournament on the 2026 WTA Tour. Both events took place at the Aviation Club Tennis Centre in Dubai, United Arab Emirates. The women's tournament took place from February 15 to 21, and the men's tournament from February 23 to 28.

== Champions ==
=== Men's singles ===
- Daniil Medvedev def. (Netherlands) Tallon Griekspoor, walkover

=== Women's singles ===
- (United States) Jessica Pegula def. (Ukraine) Elina Svitolina, 6–2, 6–4

=== Men's doubles ===
- (Finland) Harri Heliövaara / (United Kingdom) Henry Patten def. (El Salvador) Marcelo Arévalo / (Croatia) Mate Pavić, 7–5, 7–5

=== Women's doubles ===
- (Canada) Gabriela Dabrowski / (Brazil) Luisa Stefani def. (Germany) Laura Siegemund / Vera Zvonareva, 6–1, 6–3

== Points and prize money ==
=== Point distribution ===
| Event | W | F | SF | QF | Round of 16 | Round of 32 | Round of 64 | Q | Q2 | Q1 |
| Men's singles | 500 | 330 | 200 | 100 | 50 | 0 | —N/a | 25 | 13 | 0 |
| Men's doubles | 500 | 300 | 180 | 90 | 0 | —N/a | —N/a | 45 | 25 | 0 |
| Women's singles | 1000 | 650 | 390 | 215 | 120 | 65* | 10 | 30 | 20 | 2 |
| Women's doubles | 1000 | 650 | 390 | 215 | 120* | 10 | —N/a | —N/a | —N/a | —N/a |

=== Prize money ===
| Event | W | F | SF | QF | Round of 16 | Round of 32 | Round of 64 | Q2 | Q1 |
| Men's singles | $619,160 | $333,160 | $177,555 | $90,710 | $48,420 | $25,825 | —N/a | $13,235 | $7,430 |
| Men's doubles** | $203,390 | $108,470 | $54,880 | $27,450 | $14,200 | —N/a | —N/a | —N/a | —N/a |
| Women's singles | $665,000 | $385,001 | $197,000 | $98,500 | $49,250 | $26,000 | $18,300 | $11,000 | $5,800 |
| Women's doubles** | $195,000 | $110,010 | $59,000 | $30,400 | $17,200 | $11,500 | —N/a | —N/a | —N/a |

* Players with byes receive first-round points.
** Per team.

== ATP singles main-draw entrants ==
=== Seeds ===
| Country | Player | Rank^{1} | Seed |
|---|---|---|---|
| CAN | Félix Auger-Aliassime | 7 | 1 |
| KAZ | Alexander Bublik | 10 | 2 |
| | Daniil Medvedev | 11 | 3 |
| GBR | Jack Draper | 12 | 4 |
| | Andrey Rublev | 14 | 5 |
| CZE | Jakub Menšík | 16 | 6 |
| | Karen Khachanov | 17 | 7 |
| CZE | Jiří Lehečka | 22 | 8 |

- Rankings are as of 16 February 2026.

=== Other entrants ===
The following players received wildcards into the singles main draw:

- (Tunisia) Moez Echargui
- (Lebanon) Benjamin Hassan
- (Switzerland) Stan Wawrinka

The following players received entry using a protected ranking:

- (China) Shang Juncheng
- (China) Zhang Zhizhen

The following players received entry from the qualifying draw:

- (Spain) Pablo Carreño Busta
- (France) Quentin Halys
- (France) Giovanni Mpetshi Perricard
- (Finland) Otto Virtanen

The following players received entry as lucky losers:

- (Italy) Luca Nardi
- (Kazakhstan) Alexander Shevchenko
- (Germany) Jan-Lennard Struff

=== Withdrawals ===
- (France) Arthur Fils → replaced by (Italy) Luca Nardi (LL)
- (Hungary) Márton Fucsovics → replaced by (Germany) Jan-Lennard Struff (LL)
- (Czech Republic) Tomáš Macháč → replaced by (Kazakhstan) Alexander Shevchenko (LL)
- (Spain) Jaume Munar → replaced by (France) Valentin Royer

== ATP doubles main-draw entrants ==
=== Seeds ===
| Country | Player | Country | Player | Rank^{1} | Seed |
|---|---|---|---|---|---|
| GBR | Julian Cash | GBR | Lloyd Glasspool | 8 | 1 |
| ESA | Marcelo Arévalo | CRO | Mate Pavić | 12 | 2 |
| FIN | Harri Heliövaara | GBR | Henry Patten | 18 | 3 |
| ITA | Simone Bolelli | ITA | Andrea Vavassori | 37 | 4 |

- Rankings are as of 16 February 2026

=== Other entrants ===
The following pairs received wildcards into the doubles main draw:

- (India) Sriram Balaji / (Austria) Neil Oberleitner
- (Chinese Taipei) Ray Ho / (Germany) Hendrik Jebens

The following pair received entry from the qualifying draw:

- (India) Jeevan Nedunchezhiyan / (India) Ramkumar Ramanathan

The following pair received entry as lucky losers:

- (Poland) Karol Drzewiecki / (Poland) Piotr Matuszewski

=== Withdrawals ===
- (Belgium) Zizou Bergs / (Czech Republic) Tomáš Macháč → replaced by (Poland) Karol Drzewiecki / (Poland) Piotr Matuszewski

== WTA doubles main-draw entrants ==
=== Seeded teams ===
The following are the seeded teams. Seedings are based on WTA rankings as of 9 February 2026.

| Country | Player | Country | Player | Rank | Seed |
|---|---|---|---|---|---|
| ITA | Sara Errani | ITA | Jasmine Paolini | 6 | 1 |
| BEL | Elise Mertens | CHN | Zhang Shuai | 8 | 2 |
| ~~TPE~~ | ~~Hsieh Su-wei~~ | ~~LAT~~ | ~~Jeļena Ostapenko~~ | ~~23~~ | ~~3~~ |
| KAZ | Anna Danilina | SRB | Aleksandra Krunić | 23 | 4 |
| CAN | Gabriela Dabrowski | BRA | Luisa Stefani | 23 | 5 |
| USA | Asia Muhammad | NZL | Erin Routliffe | 26 | 6 |
| AUS | Storm Hunter | CZE | Kateřina Siniaková | 30 | 7 |
| ESP | Cristina Bucșa | USA | Nicole Melichar-Martinez | 39 | 8 |

=== Other entrants ===
==== Wildcards ====
- (India) Rutuja Bhosale / (Thailand) Peangtarn Plipuech
- (Australia) Kimberly Birrell / (Australia) Maya Joint

==== Protected ranking ====
- (Croatia) Darija Jurak Schreiber / (Belgium) Magali Kempen
- (Slovenia) Andreja Klepač / (Poland) Katarzyna Piter
- (Germany) Laura Siegemund / Vera Zvonareva

==== Alternates ====
- (Croatia) Petra Marčinko / (Croatia) Antonia Ružić
- Ekaterina Ovcharenko / Ekaterina Yashina

==== Withdrawals ====
- (Italy) Elisabetta Cocciaretto / (Canada) Leylah Fernandez → replaced by (Croatia) Petra Marčinko / (Croatia) Antonia Ružić
- (Chinese Taipei) Hsieh Su-wei / (Latvia) Jeļena Ostapenko → replaced by Ekaterina Ovcharenko / Ekaterina Yashina
