= 2021 Vesuvio Cup – Singles =

Singles
- 2021 Vesuvio Cup

Final
- Champion: (Netherlands) Tallon Griekspoor
- Runner-up: (United States) Alexander Ritschard
- Score: 6–3, 6–2

Events
Singles	Doubles
Vesuvio Cup	· 2022 →

This was the first edition of the tournament.

Tallon Griekspoor won the title after defeating Alexander Ritschard 6–3, 6–2 in the final.

== Seeds ==
1. (Argentina) Federico Coria (second round)
2. (Italy) Marco Cecchinato (second round)
3. (France) Hugo Gaston (first round)
4. (Slovakia) Alex Molčan (withdrew)
5. (Netherlands) Tallon Griekspoor (champion)
6. (Slovakia) Andrej Martin (second round)
7. (Spain) Bernabé Zapata Miralles (quarterfinals)
8. (Germany) Yannick Hanfmann (second round)

== Draw ==
=== Key ===
- Q = Qualifier
- WC = Wild card
- LL = Lucky loser
- Alt = Alternate
- SE = Special exempt
- PR = Protected ranking
- ITF = ITF entry
- JE = Junior exempt
- w/o = Walkover
- r = Retired
- d = Defaulted
- SR = Special ranking

=== Finals ===
Semifinals
5	(Netherlands) Tallon Griekspoor	6	6
(Italy) Flavio Cobolli	4	4
(Italy) Franco Agamenone	3	3
Q	(United States) Alexander Ritschard	6	6

Final
5	(Netherlands) Tallon Griekspoor	6	6
Q	(United States) Alexander Ritschard	3	2

=== Top half ===
First round
1	(Argentina) F Coria	6	6
Alt	(Italy) A Arnaboldi	4	2
WC	(Italy) J Berrettini	5	7^{7}	4
(France) M Guinard	7	6^{5}	6
Q	(Spain) Á López San Martín	6	6
(Kazakhstan) T Skatov	3	2
(Slovenia) B Rola	2	6^{6}
5	(Netherlands) T Griekspoor	6	7^{8}
LL	(France) E Furness	1	1
WC	(Italy) M Arnaldi	6	6
(Croatia) D Ajduković	5	3
(Italy) F Cobolli	7	6
(Italy) L Giustino	6	6
(Croatia) N Serdarušić	4	1
(Bosnia and Herzegovina) M Bašić	3	6	5
6	(Slovakia) A Martin	6	4	7

Second round
1	(Argentina) F Coria	2	2
(France) M Guinard	6	6
Q	(Spain) Á López San Martín	3	3
5	(Netherlands) T Griekspoor	6	6
WC	(Italy) M Arnaldi	1	6	2
(Italy) F Cobolli	6	3	6
(Italy) L Giustino	6	5	7
6	(Slovakia) A Martin	4	7	5

Quarterfinals
(France) M Guinard	6^{7}	6	3
5	(Netherlands) T Griekspoor	7^{9}	3	6
(Italy) F Cobolli	6	3	7
(Italy) L Giustino	4	6	5

Semifinals
5	(Netherlands) T Griekspoor	6	6
(Italy) F Cobolli	4	4

=== Bottom half ===
First round
7	(Spain) B Zapata Miralles	6	6
(Italy) A Pellegrino	3	1
(France) A Müller	6	3	6
PR	(Italy) F Baldi	1	6	2
(France) M Bourgue	6	6
Q	(Italy) L Darderi	2	4
(Italy) F Agamenone	6	2	6
3	(France) H Gaston	4	6	3
8	(Germany) Y Hanfmann	6	5	6
WC	(Italy) R Brancaccio	4	7	2
Q	(United States) A Ritschard	6	6
(United Kingdom) J Clarke	0	1
Q	(Czech Republic) J Forejtek	3	4
(Italy) GM Moroni	6	6
(Switzerland) M-A Hüsler	6	3	2
2	(Italy) M Cecchinato	4	6	6

Second round
7	(Spain) B Zapata Miralles	7^{7}	6
(France) A Müller	6^{0}	0
(France) M Bourgue	7	6^{3}	1
(Italy) F Agamenone	5	7^{7}	6
8	(Germany) Y Hanfmann	3	6	4
Q	(United States) A Ritschard	6	4	6
(Italy) GM Moroni	3	6	6
2	(Italy) M Cecchinato	6	1	4

Quarterfinals
7	(Spain) B Zapata Miralles	3	0
(Italy) F Agamenone	6	6
Q	(United States) A Ritschard	0	7^{7}	6
(Italy) GM Moroni	6	6^{1}	3

Semifinals
(Italy) F Agamenone	3	3
Q	(United States) A Ritschard	6	6
