= 2026 Dubai Tennis Championships – Men's doubles =

Men's doubles
- 2026 Dubai Tennis Championships

Final
- Champions: (Finland) Harri Heliövaara (United Kingdom) Henry Patten
- Runners-up: (El Salvador) Marcelo Arévalo (Croatia) Mate Pavić
- Score: 7–5, 7–5

Details
- Draw: 16
- Seeds: 4

Events
Singles	men	women
Doubles	men	women
- Dubai Tennis Championships

Harri Heliövaara and Henry Patten defeated Marcelo Arévalo and Mate Pavić in the final, 7–5, 7–5 to win the men's doubles tennis title at the 2026 Dubai Tennis Championships. It was their second title in as many weeks, having won in Doha the week prior.

Yuki Bhambri and Alexei Popyrin were the reigning champions, but Popyrin did not participate this year. Bhambri partnered André Göransson, but lost in the first round to Heliövaara and Patten.

== Seeds ==
1. (United Kingdom) Julian Cash / (United Kingdom) Lloyd Glasspool (semifinals)
2. (El Salvador) Marcelo Arévalo / (Croatia) Mate Pavić (final)
3. (Finland) Harri Heliövaara / (United Kingdom) Henry Patten (champions)
4. (Italy) Simone Bolelli / (Italy) Andrea Vavassori (semifinals)

== Draw ==
Key

- Q = Qualifier
- WC = Wild card
- LL = Lucky loser
- Alt = Alternate
- ITF = ITF entry
- PR = Protected ranking
- SR = Special ranking
- SE = Special exempt
- JE = Junior exempt
- JR = Junior Accelerator Programme entrant
- CO = College Accelerator Programme entrant
- NG = Next Gen Accelerator Program entrant
- w/o = Walkover
- r = Retired
- d = Defaulted

=== Draw ===
First round
1	(United Kingdom) J Cash (United Kingdom) L Glasspool	6	6
(Czech Republic) A Pavlásek (Australia) J-P Smith	3	4
Q	(India) J Nedunchezhiyan (India) R Ramanathan	6	5	[3]
(France) T Arribagé (France) A Olivetti	4	7	[10]
3	(Finland) H Heliövaara (United Kingdom) H Patten	6	6
(India) Y Bhambri (Sweden) A Göransson	1	4
PR	(Kazakhstan) A Bublik (China) J Shang	4	6	[12]
WC	(Chinese Taipei) R Ho (Germany) H Jebens	6	4	[10]
(Czech Republic) P Nouza (Czech Republic) P Rikl	6	6
(Netherlands) T Griekspoor (France) A Rinderknech	3	2
WC	(India) S Balaji (Austria) N Oberleitner	7	6^{8}	[5]
4	(Italy) S Bolelli (Italy) A Vavassori	5	7^{10}	[10]
(Portugal) F Cabral (Austria) L Miedler	4	6	[10]
LL	(Poland) K Drzewiecki (Poland) P Matuszewski	6	3	[7]
(Netherlands) S Arends (Monaco) R Arneodo	5	4
2	(El Salvador) M Arévalo (Croatia) M Pavić	7	6

Quarterfinals
1	(United Kingdom) J Cash (United Kingdom) L Glasspool	6^{6}	6	[10]
(France) T Arribagé (France) A Olivetti	7^{8}	3	[4]
3	(Finland) H Heliövaara (United Kingdom) H Patten	w/o
PR	(Kazakhstan) A Bublik (China) J Shang
(Czech Republic) P Nouza (Czech Republic) P Rikl	7^{7}	2	[8]
4	(Italy) S Bolelli (Italy) A Vavassori	6^{4}	6	[10]
(Portugal) F Cabral (Austria) L Miedler	4	6	[9]
2	(El Salvador) M Arévalo (Croatia) M Pavić	6	3	[11]

Semifinals
1	(United Kingdom) J Cash (United Kingdom) L Glasspool	4	6^{4}
3	(Finland) H Heliövaara (United Kingdom) H Patten	6	7^{7}
4	(Italy) S Bolelli (Italy) A Vavassori	6^{5}	3
2	(El Salvador) M Arévalo (Croatia) M Pavić	7^{7}	6

Final
3	(Finland) H Heliövaara (United Kingdom) H Patten	7	7
2	(El Salvador) M Arévalo (Croatia) M Pavić	5	5

== Qualifying ==
=== Seeds ===
1. (India) Anirudh Chandrasekar / (India) Vijay Sundar Prashanth (first round)
2. (Poland) Karol Drzewiecki / (Poland) Piotr Matuszewski (qualifying competition, lucky losers)

=== Qualifiers ===
1. (India) Jeevan Nedunchezhiyan / (India) Ramkumar Ramanathan

=== Lucky losers ===
1. (Poland) Karol Drzewiecki / (Poland) Piotr Matuszewski

=== Qualifying draw ===
First round
1	(India) Anirudh Chandrasekar (India) Vijay Sundar Prashanth	4	6^{4}
WC	(India) Jeevan Nedunchezhiyan (India) Ramkumar Ramanathan	6	7^{7}
(Romania) Victor Cornea (Poland) Szymon Walków	6^{4}	3
2	(Poland) Karol Drzewiecki (Poland) Piotr Matuszewski	7^{7}	6

Qualifying competition
WC	(India) Jeevan Nedunchezhiyan (India) Ramkumar Ramanathan	6	7^{7}
2	(Poland) Karol Drzewiecki (Poland) Piotr Matuszewski	4	6^{4}
