= 2021 Slovak Open II =

- Date: 8–14 November
- Edition: 23rd
- Category: ATP Challenger Tour
- Surface: Hard (Indoor)
- Location: Bratislava, Slovakia

Champions

Singles
- (Netherlands) Tallon Griekspoor

Doubles
- (Slovakia) Filip Horanský / (Ukraine) Sergiy Stakhovsky
- Slovak Open

The 2021 Peugeot Slovak Open II was a professional tennis tournament played on hard courts. It was the 23rd edition of the tournament which was part of the 2021 ATP Challenger Tour. It took place in Bratislava, Slovakia between 8 and 14 November 2021.

== Singles main-draw entrants ==
=== Seeds ===
Country	Player	Rank^{1}	Seed
ITA	Stefano Travaglia	81	1
NED	Tallon Griekspoor	88	2
ESP	Carlos Taberner	95	3
SVK	Norbert Gombos	110	4
SVK	Alex Molčan	114	5
~~FRA~~	~~Gilles Simon~~	~~120~~	~~6~~
GBR	Liam Broady	121	7
CZE	Tomáš Macháč	134	8

- ^{1} Rankings are as of 1 November 2021.

=== Other entrants ===
The following players received wildcards into the singles main draw:

- (Czech Republic) Jonáš Forejtek
- (Slovakia) Lukáš Palovič
- (Slovakia) Lukáš Pokorný

The following player received entry into the singles main draw as an alternate:

- (Germany) Tobias Kamke

The following players received entry from the qualifying draw:

- (Ukraine) Danylo Kalenichenko
- (Slovakia) Miloš Karol
- (Hungary) Zsombor Piros
- (Czech Republic) Dalibor Svrčina

The following players received entry as lucky losers:

- (Japan) Shintaro Mochizuki
- (Russia) Alexander Shevchenko

== Champions ==
=== Singles ===
- (Netherlands) Tallon Griekspoor def. (Hungary) Zsombor Piros 6–3, 6–2.

=== Doubles ===
- (Slovakia) Filip Horanský / (Ukraine) Sergiy Stakhovsky def. (Ukraine) Denys Molchanov / (Kazakhstan) Aleksandr Nedovyesov 6–4, 6–4.
