= 2026 Dubai Tennis Championships – Men's singles =

Men's singles
- 2026 Dubai Tennis Championships

Final
- Champion: Daniil Medvedev
- Runner-up: (Netherlands) Tallon Griekspoor
- Score: Walkover

Details
- Draw: 32 (3WC, 4Q)
- Seeds: 8

Events
Singles	men	women
Doubles	men	women
- Dubai Tennis Championships

Daniil Medvedev won the men's singles tennis title at the 2026 Dubai Tennis Championships after Tallon Griekspoor withdrew from the final due to a left-hamstring injury. He did not drop a set en route to his 23rd ATP Tour title and second title in Dubai (after 2023). This was the first time Medvedev won a second title at the same tournament. This was the seventh time that an ATP Tour singles final ended in a walkover, and the first since 2017.

Stefanos Tsitsipas was the defending champion, but lost in the first round to Ugo Humbert.

== Seeds ==
1. (Canada) Félix Auger-Aliassime (semifinals)
2. (Kazakhstan) Alexander Bublik (second round)
3. Daniil Medvedev (champion)
4. (United Kingdom) Jack Draper (second round)
5. Andrey Rublev (semifinals)
6. (Czech Republic) Jakub Menšík (quarterfinals)
7. Karen Khachanov (second round)
8. (Czech Republic) Jiří Lehečka (quarterfinals)

== Draw ==
Key

- Q = Qualifier
- WC = Wild card
- LL = Lucky loser
- Alt = Alternate
- ITF = ITF entry
- PR = Protected ranking
- SR = Special ranking
- SE = Special exempt
- JE = Junior exempt
- JR = Junior Accelerator Programme entrant
- CO = College Accelerator Programme entrant
- NG = Next Gen Accelerator Program entrant
- w/o = Walkover
- r = Retired
- d = Defaulted

=== Finals ===
Semifinals
1	(Canada) Félix Auger-Aliassime	4	2
3	Daniil Medvedev	6	6
5	Andrey Rublev	5	6^{6}
(Netherlands) Tallon Griekspoor	7	7^{8}

Final
3	Daniil Medvedev	w/o
(Netherlands) Tallon Griekspoor

=== Top half ===
First round
1	(Canada) F Auger-Aliassime	6	7^{7}
PR	(China) Z Zhang	3	6^{4}
WC	(Tunisia) M Echargui	6^{3}	7^{7}	6^{4}
Q	(France) G Mpetshi Perricard	7^{7}	6^{3}	7^{7}
Q	(Spain) P Carreño Busta	6	6
(Canada) D Shapovalov	2	4
LL	(Italy) L Nardi	6	4	2
8	(Czech Republic) J Lehečka	4	6	6
3	D Medvedev	6	6
PR	(China) J Shang	1	3
WC	(Switzerland) S Wawrinka	7	6
WC	(Lebanon) B Hassan	5	3
(Belgium) Z Bergs	3	4
(United States) J Brooksby	6	6
LL	(Kazakhstan) A Shevchenko	7^{7}	2	3
7	K Khachanov	6^{5}	6	6

Second round
1	(Canada) F Auger-Aliassime	6	6
Q	(France) G Mpetshi Perricard	4	4
Q	(Spain) P Carreño Busta	6^{6}	4
8	(Czech Republic) J Lehečka	7^{8}	6
3	D Medvedev	6	6
WC	(Switzerland) S Wawrinka	2	3
(United States) J Brooksby	7^{8}	6
7	K Khachanov	6^{6}	4

Quarterfinals
1	(Canada) F Auger-Aliassime	6	7^{7}
8	(Czech Republic) J Lehečka	3	6^{2}
3	D Medvedev	6	6
(United States) J Brooksby	2	1

Semifinals
1	(Canada) F Auger-Aliassime	4	2
3	D Medvedev	6	6

=== Bottom half ===
First round
5	A Rublev	6	6
(France) V Royer	3	4
(France) U Humbert	6	7
(Greece) S Tsitsipas	4	5
(Hungary) F Marozsán	6	3	4
(France) A Rinderknech	3	6	6
Q	(France) Q Halys	6^{8}	3
4	(United Kingdom) J Draper	7^{10}	6
6	(Czech Republic) J Menšík	6	7^{9}
(Poland) H Hurkacz	4	6^{7}
(Australia) A Popyrin	3	6	7
(Poland) K Majchrzak	6	3	5
Q	(Finland) O Virtanen	3	4
(Netherlands) T Griekspoor	6	6
LL	(Germany) J-L Struff	3	4
2	(Kazakhstan) A Bublik	6	6

Second round
5	A Rublev	6	6^{5}	6
(France) U Humbert	4	7^{7}	3
(France) A Rinderknech	7	6^{4}	6
4	(United Kingdom) J Draper	5	7^{7}	4
6	(Czech Republic) J Menšík	6	6
(Australia) A Popyrin	3	2
(Netherlands) T Griekspoor	6	7^{7}
2	(Kazakhstan) A Bublik	3	6^{4}

Quarterfinals
5	A Rublev	6	6
(France) A Rinderknech	2	4
6	(Czech Republic) J Menšík	3	6	2
(Netherlands) T Griekspoor	6	3	6

Semifinals
5	A Rublev	5	6^{6}
(Netherlands) T Griekspoor	7	7^{8}

== Qualifying ==
=== Seeds ===
1. (Netherlands) Botic van de Zandschulp (first round)
2. (France) Giovanni Mpetshi Perricard (qualified)
3. (France) Quentin Halys (qualified)
4. (Germany) Jan-Lennard Struff (qualifying competition, lucky loser)
5. (Kazakhstan) Alexander Shevchenko (qualifying competition, lucky loser)
6. (Netherlands) Jesper de Jong (first round)
7. (Australia) Aleksandar Vukic (first round)
8. (Italy) Luca Nardi (qualifying competition, lucky loser)

=== Qualifiers ===
1. (Spain) Pablo Carreño Busta
2. (France) Giovanni Mpetshi Perricard
3. (France) Quentin Halys
4. (Finland) Otto Virtanen

=== Lucky losers ===
1. (Germany) Jan-Lennard Struff
2. (Kazakhstan) Alexander Shevchenko
3. (Italy) Luca Nardi

=== Qualifying draw ===
==== First qualifier ====
First round
1	(Netherlands) Botic van de Zandschulp	3	2
(Spain) Pablo Carreño Busta	6	6
WC	(Argentina) Marco Trungelliti	6	2	6^{3}
8	(Italy) Luca Nardi	2	6	7^{7}

Qualifying competition
(Spain) Pablo Carreño Busta	6^{4}	6	7^{7}
8	(Italy) Luca Nardi	7^{7}	4	6^{5}

==== Second qualifier ====
First round
2	(France) Giovanni Mpetshi Perricard	6	7^{7}
(Japan) Shintaro Mochizuki	1	6^{4}
(United Kingdom) Jan Choinski	6	7^{7}
6	(Netherlands) Jesper de Jong	1	6^{4}

Qualifying competition
2	(France) Giovanni Mpetshi Perricard	4	6	7^{7}
(United Kingdom) Jan Choinski	6	3	6^{3}

==== Third qualifier ====
First round
3	(France) Quentin Halys	6	6
(Australia) Christopher O'Connell	3	4
WC	(Georgia (country)) Nikoloz Basilashvili	6^{1}	4
5	(Kazakhstan) Alexander Shevchenko	7^{7}	6

Qualifying competition
3	(France) Quentin Halys	7^{8}	7
5	(Kazakhstan) Alexander Shevchenko	6^{6}	5

==== Fourth qualifier ====
First round
4	(Germany) Jan-Lennard Struff	6	6
WC	(United Arab Emirates) Abdulrahman Al Janahi	0	1
(Finland) Otto Virtanen	6	6
7	(Australia) Aleksandar Vukic	2	2

Qualifying competition
4	(Germany) Jan-Lennard Struff	7^{9}	4	4
(Finland) Otto Virtanen	6^{7}	6	6
