= 2021 Slovak Open II – Singles =

Singles
- 2021 Slovak Open II

Final
- Champion: (Netherlands) Tallon Griekspoor
- Runner-up: (Hungary) Zsombor Piros
- Score: 6–3, 6–2

Events
Singles	Doubles
- Slovak Open

Maximilian Marterer was the defending champion but lost in the quarterfinals to Stefano Travaglia.

Tallon Griekspoor won the title after defeating Zsombor Piros 6–3, 6–2 in the final.

== Seeds ==
1. (Italy) Stefano Travaglia (semifinals, retired)
2. (Netherlands) Tallon Griekspoor (champion)
3. (Spain) Carlos Taberner (first round)
4. (Slovakia) Norbert Gombos (first round)
5. (Slovakia) Alex Molčan (semifinals)
6. (France) Gilles Simon (withdrew)
7. (United Kingdom) Liam Broady (second round)
8. (Czech Republic) Tomáš Macháč (first round)

== Draw ==
Key

- Q = Qualifier
- WC = Wild card
- LL = Lucky loser
- Alt = Alternate
- ITF = ITF entry
- PR = Protected ranking
- SR = Special ranking
- SE = Special exempt
- JE = Junior exempt
- JR = Junior Accelerator Programme entrant
- CO = College Accelerator Programme entrant
- NG = Next Gen Accelerator Program entrant
- w/o = Walkover
- r = Retired
- d = Defaulted

=== Finals ===
Semifinals
1	(Italy) Stefano Travaglia	6^{5}	2^{r}
Q	(Hungary) Zsombor Piros	7^{7}	3
5	(Slovakia) Alex Molčan	7^{7}	3	4
2	(Netherlands) Tallon Griekspoor	6^{5}	6	6

Final
Q	(Hungary) Zsombor Piros	3	2
2	(Netherlands) Tallon Griekspoor	6	6

=== Top half ===
First round
1	(Italy) S Travaglia	7^{7}	6
(Czech Republic) Z Kolář	6^{4}	3
(Turkey) C İlkel	6	6^{1}	6
LL	(Russia) A Shevchenko	4	7^{7}	3
(Germany) M Marterer	4	6	6
(Austria) J Rodionov	6	1	4
(Ukraine) I Marchenko	2	1
7	(United Kingdom) L Broady	6	6
3	(Spain) C Taberner	2	6^{5}
(Portugal) F Ferreira Silva	6	7^{7}
Q	(Czech Republic) D Svrčina	2	7^{7}	6
(Slovakia) F Horanský	6	6^{5}	1
Q	(Slovakia) M Karol	4	3
(Slovakia) L Lacko	6	6
Q	(Hungary) Z Piros	7	3	6
8	(Czech Republic) T Macháč	5	6	4

Second round
1	(Italy) S Travaglia	6	6
(Turkey) C İlkel	4	2
(Germany) M Marterer	6	7^{8}
7	(United Kingdom) L Broady	4	6^{6}
(Portugal) F Ferreira Silva	6	7
Q	(Czech Republic) D Svrčina	4	5
(Slovakia) L Lacko	2	4
Q	(Hungary) Z Piros	6	6

Quarterfinals
1	(Italy) S Travaglia	7^{7}	6
(Germany) M Marterer	6^{1}	1
(Portugal) F Ferreira Silva	0	4
Q	(Hungary) Z Piros	6	6

Semifinals
1	(Italy) S Travaglia	6^{5}	2^{r}
Q	(Hungary) Z Piros	7^{7}	3

=== Bottom half ===
First round
5	(Slovakia) A Molčan	6	7^{9}
(India) R Ramanathan	3	6^{7}
WC	(Czech Republic) J Forejtek	2	4
Alt	(Germany) T Kamke	6	6
(Portugal) J Sousa	6^{6}	7^{7}	6^{2}
(Turkey) A Çelikbilek	7^{8}	6^{3}	7^{7}
(Bosnia and Herzegovina) D Džumhur	6	6
4	(Slovakia) N Gombos	3	3
LL	(Japan) S Mochizuki	6^{5}	3
(Poland) K Żuk	7^{7}	6
(Ukraine) S Stakhovsky	4	5
(Czech Republic) J Lehečka	6	7
Q	(Ukraine) D Kalenichenko	7^{7}	7^{7}
WC	(Slovakia) Lukáš Palovič	6^{4}	6^{5}
WC	(Slovakia) L Pokorný	6^{4}	1
2	(Netherlands) T Griekspoor	7^{7}	6

Second round
5	(Slovakia) A Molčan	6	6
Alt	(Germany) T Kamke	2	2
(Turkey) A Çelikbilek	4	4
(Bosnia and Herzegovina) D Džumhur	6	6
(Poland) K Żuk	6	3	2
(Czech Republic) J Lehečka	2	6	6
Q	(Ukraine) D Kalenichenko	6^{2}	6^{1}
2	(Netherlands) T Griekspoor	7^{7}	7^{7}

Quarterfinals
5	(Slovakia) A Molčan	6	4	6
(Bosnia and Herzegovina) D Džumhur	1	6	3
(Czech Republic) J Lehečka	6^{3}	4
2	(Netherlands) T Griekspoor	7^{7}	6

Semifinals
5	(Slovakia) A Molčan	7^{7}	3	4
2	(Netherlands) T Griekspoor	6^{5}	6	6
