= 2024 Dubai Tennis Championships – Men's doubles =

Men's doubles
- 2024 Dubai Tennis Championships

Final
- Champions: (Netherlands) Tallon Griekspoor (Germany) Jan-Lennard Struff
- Runners-up: (Croatia) Ivan Dodig (United States) Austin Krajicek
- Score: 6–4, 4–6, [10–6]

Details
- Draw: 16
- Seeds: 4

Events
Singles	men	women
Doubles	men	women
← 2023 ·	Dubai Tennis Championships	· 2025 →

Tallon Griekspoor and Jan-Lennard Struff defeated Ivan Dodig and Austin Krajicek in the final, 6–4, 4–6, [10–6] to win the men's doubles tennis title at the 2024 Dubai Tennis Championships.

Maxime Cressy and Fabrice Martin were the defending champions, but did not participate this year.

Rohan Bopanna reclaimed the ATP No. 1 doubles ranking from his partner Matthew Ebden after the pair won their first round match.

== Seeds ==
1. (India) Rohan Bopanna / (Australia) Matthew Ebden (quarterfinals)
2. (Croatia) Ivan Dodig / (United States) Austin Krajicek (final)
3. (United Kingdom) Jamie Murray / (New Zealand) Michael Venus (quarterfinals)
4. (Netherlands) Wesley Koolhof / (Croatia) Nikola Mektić (first round)

== Draw ==
=== Key ===
- Q = Qualifier
- WC = Wild card
- LL = Lucky loser
- Alt = Alternate
- ITF = ITF entry
- PR = Protected ranking
- SR = Special ranking
- SE = Special exempt
- JE = Junior exempt
- JR = Junior Accelerator Programme entrant
- CO = College Accelerator Programme entrant
- NG = Next Gen Accelerator Program entrant
- w/o = Walkover
- r = Retired
- d = Defaulted

=== Draw ===
First round
1	(India) R Bopanna (Australia) M Ebden	7^{7}	7^{7}
WC	(Tunisia) S Mansouri (Pakistan) A-u-H Qureshi	6^{4}	6^{5}
(Uruguay) A Behar (Czech Republic) A Pavlásek	3	6	[10]
(United States) N Lammons (United States) J Withrow	6	3	[8]
4	(Netherlands) W Koolhof (Croatia) N Mektić	3	6^{5}
(Netherlands) T Griekspoor (Germany) J-L Struff	6	7^{7}
(Spain) A Davidovich Fokina (Czech Republic) J Lehečka	1	7^{7}	[9]
(France) N Mahut (France) É Roger-Vasselin	6	6^{1}	[11]
(Kazakhstan) A Bublik (France) A Mannarino	7^{8}	3	[8]
Q	(India) Y Bhambri (Netherlands) R Haase	6^{6}	6	[10]
(Belgium) S Gillé (Belgium) J Vliegen	3	7^{7}	[7]
3	(United Kingdom) J Murray (New Zealand) M Venus	6	6^{2}	[10]
WC	(Republic of Ireland) M Agwi (Republic of Ireland) O O'Hoisin	0	6^{5}
(United Kingdom) L Glasspool (Netherlands) J-J Rojer	6	7^{7}
LL	(Germany) A Mies (Australia) J-P Smith	6^{2}	6^{4}
2	(Croatia) I Dodig (United States) A Krajicek	7^{7}	7^{7}

Quarterfinals
1	(India) R Bopanna (Australia) M Ebden	6	3	[8]
(Uruguay) A Behar (Czech Republic) A Pavlásek	3	6	[10]
(Netherlands) T Griekspoor (Germany) J-L Struff	6	6
(France) N Mahut (France) É Roger-Vasselin	4	4
Q	(India) Y Bhambri (Netherlands) R Haase	6	7^{7}
3	(United Kingdom) J Murray (New Zealand) M Venus	4	6^{1}
(United Kingdom) L Glasspool (Netherlands) J-J Rojer	7^{7}	3	[5]
2	(Croatia) I Dodig (United States) A Krajicek	6^{5}	6	[10]

Semifinals
(Uruguay) A Behar (Czech Republic) A Pavlásek	6^{1}	5
(Netherlands) T Griekspoor (Germany) J-L Struff	7^{7}	7
Q	(India) Y Bhambri (Netherlands) R Haase	3	6^{2}
2	(Croatia) I Dodig (United States) A Krajicek	6	7^{7}

Final
(Netherlands) T Griekspoor (Germany) J-L Struff	6	4	[10]
2	(Croatia) I Dodig (United States) A Krajicek	4	6	[6]

== Qualifying ==
=== Seeds ===
1. (India) Yuki Bhambri / (Netherlands) Robin Haase (qualified)
2. (Germany) Andreas Mies / (Australia) John-Patrick Smith (qualifying competition, lucky losers)

=== Qualifiers ===
1. (India) Yuki Bhambri / (Netherlands) Robin Haase

=== Lucky losers ===
1. (Germany) Andreas Mies / (Australia) John-Patrick Smith

=== Qualifying draw ===
First round
1	(India) Yuki Bhambri (Netherlands) Robin Haase	6	7^{7}
(India) Sriram Balaji (Germany) Andre Begemann	4	6^{5}
WC	(United Arab Emirates) Abdulrahman Al Janahi (United Arab Emirates) Hamad Abbas Janahi	1	1
2	(Germany) Andreas Mies (Australia) John-Patrick Smith	6	6

Qualifying competition
1	(India) Yuki Bhambri (Netherlands) Robin Haase	6^{2}	6	[12]
2	(Germany) Andreas Mies (Australia) John-Patrick Smith	7^{7}	3	[10]
