= 2024 Dubai Tennis Championships – Women's singles =

Women's singles
- 2024 Dubai Tennis Championships

Final
- Champion: (Italy) Jasmine Paolini
- Runner-up: Anna Kalinskaya
- Score: 4–6, 7–5, 7–5

Details
- Draw: 56 (8Q / 4WC)
- Seeds: 16

Events
Singles	men	women
Doubles	men	women
- Dubai Tennis Championships

Jasmine Paolini defeated Anna Kalinskaya in the final, 4–6, 7–5, 7–5 to win the women's singles title at the 2024 Dubai Tennis Championships. It was her first WTA 1000 title and second WTA Tour singles title overall. Paolini avenged her loss to Kalinskaya at the Australian Open, where both players had progressed to the second week of a major for the first time. Kalinskaya was the second qualifier to contest a WTA 1000 final, following Caroline Garcia at the 2022 Cincinnati Open.

Barbora Krejčíková was the reigning champion, but withdrew before the tournament began.

Celine Simunyu received a wildcard for the qualifying event, becoming the first Irish player to be awarded a wildcard at a WTA Tour event.

Iga Świątek retained the world No. 1 ranking after Aryna Sabalenka lost in the second round.

== Seeds ==
The top eight seeds received a bye into the second round.

1. (Poland) Iga Świątek (semifinals)
2. Aryna Sabalenka (second round)
3. (United States) Coco Gauff (quarterfinals)
4. (Kazakhstan) Elena Rybakina (quarterfinals, withdrew)
5. (Tunisia) Ons Jabeur (withdrew)
6. (China) Zheng Qinwen (quarterfinals)
7. (Czech Republic) Markéta Vondroušová (quarterfinals)
8. (Greece) Maria Sakkari (third round)

9. (Latvia) Jeļena Ostapenko (third round)
10. Daria Kasatkina (first round)
11. (Brazil) Beatriz Haddad Maia (first round)
12. Liudmila Samsonova (third round)
13. Veronika Kudermetova (second round)
14. Ekaterina Alexandrova (first round)
15. (Ukraine) Elina Svitolina (third round)
16. (France) Caroline Garcia (first round)

Click on the seed number of a player to go to their draw section.

== Draw ==
Key

- Q = Qualifier
- WC = Wild card
- LL = Lucky loser
- Alt = Alternate
- ITF = ITF entry
- PR = Protected ranking
- SR = Special ranking
- SE = Special exempt
- JE = Junior exempt
- JR = Junior Accelerator Programme entrant
- CO = College Accelerator Programme entrant
- NG = Next Gen Accelerator Program entrant
- w/o = Walkover
- r = Retired
- d = Defaulted

=== Finals ===
Quarterfinals
1	(Poland) Iga Świątek	6	6
6	(China) Zheng Qinwen	3	2
3	(United States) Coco Gauff	6	4	2
Q	Anna Kalinskaya	2	6	6
(Italy) Jasmine Paolini	w/o
4	(Kazakhstan) Elena Rybakina
7	(Czech Republic) Markéta Vondroušová	6	6^{1}	2
(Romania) Sorana Cîrstea	2	7^{7}	6

Semifinals
1	(Poland) Iga Świątek	4	4
Q	Anna Kalinskaya	6	6
(Italy) Jasmine Paolini	6	7^{8}
(Romania) Sorana Cîrstea	2	6^{6}

Final
Q	Anna Kalinskaya	6	5	5
(Italy) Jasmine Paolini	4	7	7

=== Top half ===
==== Section 1 ====
First round
(United States) S Stephens	6	1	6
Q	(France) C Burel	4	6	2
(France) V Gracheva	2	1
(Germany) T Maria	6	6
(Ukraine) A Kalinina	3	6^{7}
15	(Ukraine) E Svitolina	6	7^{9}
10	D Kasatkina	6^{5}	6	5
LL	(Italy) L Bronzetti	7^{7}	4	7
(China) L Zhu	6	2	4
A Potapova	4	6	6
Q	(Japan) N Hibino	6	3	6
(Poland) M Linette	2	6	4

Second round
1	(Poland) I Świątek	6	6
(United States) S Stephens	4	4
(Germany) T Maria	3	3
15	(Ukraine) E Svitolina	6	6
LL	(Italy) L Bronzetti	0	3
A Potapova	6	6
Q	(Japan) N Hibino	7	2	2
6	(China) Q Zheng	5	6	6

Third round
1	(Poland) I Świątek	6	6
15	(Ukraine) E Svitolina	1	4
A Potapova	3	2
6	(China) Q Zheng	6	6

Quarterfinals
1	(Poland) I Świątek	6	6
6	(China) Q Zheng	3	2

==== Section 2 ====
First round
(Belgium) E Mertens	6	3	6^{3}
LL	(Italy) E Cocciaretto	1	6	7^{7}
(Czech Republic) Ka Plíšková	6	7
WC	(China) S Zhang	3	5
WC	(United States) A Krueger	3	6	6
16	(France) C Garcia	6	3	3
9	(Latvia) J Ostapenko	5	6	6
Q	(China) Xiy Wang	7	2	3
PR	(Spain) P Badosa	4	0^{r}
WC	(Switzerland) L Sun	6	0
Q	A Kalinskaya	6	6
Q	(Australia) S Hunter	1	2

Second round
3	(United States) C Gauff	6	7
LL	(Italy) E Cocciaretto	1	5
(Czech Republic) Ka Plíšková	6^{2}	6	6
WC	(United States) A Krueger	7^{7}	3	4
9	(Latvia) J Ostapenko	6	6
WC	(Switzerland) L Sun	4	3
Q	A Kalinskaya	6	6
LL	(Spain) C Bucșa	3	4

Third round
3	(United States) C Gauff	2	6	6
(Czech Republic) Ka Plíšková	6	4	3
9	(Latvia) J Ostapenko	4	5
Q	A Kalinskaya	6	7

Quarterfinals
3	(United States) C Gauff	6	4	2
Q	A Kalinskaya	2	6	6

=== Bottom half ===
==== Section 3 ====
First round
(Czech Republic) K Siniaková	6	5	4
(United States) E Navarro	4	7	6
(Canada) L Fernandez	6	6
Q	(United States) B Pera	3	2
(Italy) J Paolini	4	6	6
11	(Brazil) B Haddad Maia	6	4	0
14	E Alexandrova	6^{2}	3
Q	(Poland) M Fręch	7^{7}	6
(Croatia) P Martić	6	7^{7}
(United States) C Dolehide	4	6^{4}
(Netherlands) A Rus	2	4
V Azarenka	6	6

Second round
8	(Greece) M Sakkari	6	6
(United States) E Navarro	2	4
(Canada) L Fernandez	3	4
(Italy) J Paolini	6	6
Q	(Poland) M Fręch	6	1	6
(Croatia) P Martić	4	6	2
V Azarenka	6	2	0^{r}
4	(Kazakhstan) E Rybakina	4	6	0

Third round
8	(Greece) M Sakkari	4	2
(Italy) J Paolini	6	6
Q	(Poland) M Fręch	6^{5}	6	4
4	(Kazakhstan) E Rybakina	7^{7}	3	6

Quarterfinals
(Italy) J Paolini	w/o
4	(Kazakhstan) E Rybakina

==== Section 4 ====
First round
M Andreeva	2	6	1
(United States) P Stearns	6	2	6
A Pavlyuchenkova	6	6
(Czech Republic) M Bouzková	4	3
Q	(Bulgaria) V Tomova	6^{2}	3
12	L Samsonova	7^{7}	6
13	V Kudermetova	6	1	6
WC	(Ukraine) D Yastremska	0	6	0
(United States) S Kenin	3	6^{2}
(Romania) S Cîrstea	6	7^{7}
(China) Xin Wang	2	4
(Croatia) D Vekić	6	6

Second round
7	(Czech Republic) M Vondroušová	6	5	6
(United States) P Stearns	1	7	2
A Pavlyuchenkova
12	L Samsonova	w/o
13	V Kudermetova	1	4
(Romania) S Cîrstea	6	6
(Croatia) D Vekić	6^{5}	6	6
2	A Sabalenka	7^{7}	3	0

Third round
7	(Czech Republic) M Vondroušová	6	6
12	L Samsonova	2	2
(Romania) S Cîrstea	3	6	7
(Croatia) D Vekić	6	3	5

Quarterfinals
7	(Czech Republic) M Vondroušová	6	6^{1}	2
(Romania) S Cîrstea	2	7^{7}	6

== Qualifying ==
=== Seeds ===
1. Anna Kalinskaya (qualified)
2. (Czech Republic) Kateřina Siniaková (moved to main draw)
3. (France) Clara Burel (qualified)
4. (Poland) Magdalena Fręch (qualified)
5. (Italy) Elisabetta Cocciaretto (qualifying competition, lucky loser)
6. (Italy) Lucia Bronzetti (qualifying competition, lucky loser)
7. (Italy) Martina Trevisan (first round)
8. (China) Wang Xiyu (qualified)
9. (United States) Danielle Collins (withdrew)
10. (Spain) Cristina Bucșa (qualifying competition, lucky loser)
11. (Bulgaria) Viktoriya Tomova (qualified)
12. (Romania) Jaqueline Cristian (first round)
13. (Kazakhstan) Yulia Putintseva (qualifying competition)
14. (United States) Bernarda Pera (qualified)
15. (Belgium) Greet Minnen (first round)
16. Kamilla Rakhimova (qualifying competition)

=== Qualifiers ===
1. Anna Kalinskaya
2. (Bulgaria) Viktoriya Tomova
3. (France) Clara Burel
4. (Poland) Magdalena Fręch
5. (United States) Bernarda Pera
6. (Japan) Nao Hibino
7. (Australia) Storm Hunter
8. (China) Wang Xiyu

=== Lucky losers ===
1. (Italy) Elisabetta Cocciaretto
2. (Italy) Lucia Bronzetti
3. (Spain) Cristina Bucșa

=== Draw ===
==== First qualifier ====
First round
1	Anna Kalinskaya	6	6
(Spain) Rebeka Masarova	4	3
(United States) Alycia Parks	6^{2}	1
16	Kamilla Rakhimova	7^{7}	6

Qualifying competition
1	Anna Kalinskaya	6	6
16	Kamilla Rakhimova	2	2

==== Second qualifier ====
First round
Alt	(Hungary) Tímea Babos	6	2	6
Maria Timofeeva	2	6	3
WC	(India) Ankita Raina	4	0
11	(Bulgaria) Viktoriya Tomova	6	6

Qualifying competition
Alt	(Hungary) Tímea Babos	4	3
11	(Bulgaria) Viktoriya Tomova	6	6

==== Third qualifier ====
First round
3	(France) Clara Burel	3	6	6
Aliaksandra Sasnovich	6	4	4
(Germany) Eva Lys	3	7^{7}	6
12	(Romania) Jaqueline Cristian	6	6^{3}	2

Qualifying competition
3	(France) Clara Burel	6	6
(Germany) Eva Lys	2	1

==== Fourth qualifier ====
First round
4	(Poland) Magdalena Fręch	2	6	4
(Australia) Arina Rodionova	6	3	1^{r}
WC	(Mali) Coumba Ben Niangadou	1	1
13	(Kazakhstan) Yulia Putintseva	6	6

Qualifying competition
4	(Poland) Magdalena Fręch	6	3	6
13	(Kazakhstan) Yulia Putintseva	3	6	4

==== Fifth qualifier ====
First round
5	(Italy) Elisabetta Cocciaretto	6	6
WC	(Turkey) Zeynep Sönmez	3	0
(Germany) Laura Siegemund	6	1	2
14	(United States) Bernarda Pera	4	6	6

Qualifying competition
5	(Italy) Elisabetta Cocciaretto	6	5	2
14	(United States) Bernarda Pera	4	7	6

==== Sixth qualifier ====
First round
6	(Italy) Lucia Bronzetti	6	6
(Czech Republic) Tereza Martincová	1	4
(Japan) Nao Hibino	6	6
15	(Belgium) Greet Minnen	4	2

Qualifying competition
6	(Italy) Lucia Bronzetti	6	3	4
(Japan) Nao Hibino	3	6	6

==== Seventh qualifier ====
First round
7	(Italy) Martina Trevisan	5	4
(Australia) Storm Hunter	7	6
WC	(Republic of Ireland) Celine Simunyu	0	3
10	(Spain) Cristina Bucșa	6	6

Qualifying competition
(Australia) Storm Hunter	4	6	6
10	(Spain) Cristina Bucșa	6	4	2

==== Eighth qualifier ====
First round
8	(China) Wang Xiyu	6	6
Erika Andreeva	4	2
(Italy) Sara Errani	6	6
Alt	(Turkey) İpek Öz	3	0

Qualifying competition
8	(China) Wang Xiyu	6	6
(Italy) Sara Errani	3	2
