= 2024 Dubai Tennis Championships – Women's doubles =

Women's doubles
- 2024 Dubai Tennis Championships

Final
- Champions: (Australia) Storm Hunter (Czech Republic) Kateřina Siniaková
- Runners-up: (United States) Nicole Melichar-Martinez (Australia) Ellen Perez
- Score: 6–4, 6–2

Details
- Draw: 28 (3 WC)
- Seeds: 8

Events
Singles	men	women
Doubles	men	women
- Dubai Tennis Championships

Storm Hunter and Kateřina Siniaková defeated Nicole Melichar-Martinez and Ellen Perez in the final, 6–4, 6–2 to win the women's doubles tennis title at the 2024 Dubai Tennis Championships.

Veronika Kudermetova and Liudmila Samsonova were the reigning champions, but Samsonova chose not to participate this year. Kudermetova partnered Alexandra Panova, but lost in the first round to Alycia Parks and Xu Yifan.

== Seeds ==
The top four seeds received a bye into the second round.

1. (Chinese Taipei) Hsieh Su-wei / (Belgium) Elise Mertens (second round)
2. (Canada) Gabriela Dabrowski / (New Zealand) Erin Routliffe (semifinals)
3. (United States) Nicole Melichar-Martinez / (Australia) Ellen Perez (final)
4. (Australia) Storm Hunter / (Czech Republic) Kateřina Siniaková (champions)
5. (Netherlands) Demi Schuurs / (Brazil) Luisa Stefani (first round)
6. (Ukraine) Lyudmyla Kichenok / (Latvia) Jeļena Ostapenko (quarterfinals)
7. (Chinese Taipei) Chan Hao-ching / (Mexico) Giuliana Olmos (second round)
8. (United States) Caroline Dolehide / (United States) Desirae Krawczyk (first round)

== Draw ==
Key

- Q = Qualifier
- WC = Wild card
- LL = Lucky loser
- Alt = Alternate
- ITF = ITF entry
- PR = Protected ranking
- SR = Special ranking
- SE = Special exempt
- JE = Junior exempt
- JR = Junior Accelerator Programme entrant
- CO = College Accelerator Programme entrant
- NG = Next Gen Accelerator Program entrant
- w/o = Walkover
- r = Retired
- d = Defaulted

=== Finals ===
Semifinals
Aliaksandra Sasnovich (Germany) Laura Siegemund	3	2
3	(United States) Nicole Melichar-Martinez (Australia) Ellen Perez	6	6
4	(Australia) Storm Hunter (Czech Republic) Kateřina Siniaková	6	6
2	(Canada) Gabriela Dabrowski (New Zealand) Erin Routliffe	4	4

Final
3	(United States) Nicole Melichar-Martinez (Australia) Ellen Perez	4	2
4	(Australia) Storm Hunter (Czech Republic) Kateřina Siniaková	6	6

=== Top half ===
First round
A Sasnovich (Germany) L Siegemund	0	7	[10]
(Japan) E Hozumi (Japan) M Ninomiya	6	5	[6]
(Norway) U Eikeri (Chinese Taipei) F-h Wu	6^{5}	6	[10]
A Potapova; V Zvonareva	7^{7}	1	[6]
(Poland) M Linette (Romania) M Niculescu	6	2	[4]
7	(Chinese Taipei) H-c Chan (Mexico) G Olmos	1	6	[10]
M Andreeva (United States) S Kenin	6	3	[11]
(Canada) L Fernandez (Georgia (country)) O Kalashnikova	4	6	[9]
E Alexandrova (United States) B Mattek-Sands	6	3	[8]
(China) H Guo (China) X Jiang	3	6	[10]
WC	(France) C Garcia (France) K Mladenovic	6	6
8	(United States) C Dolehide (United States) D Krawczyk	2	2

Second round
1	(Chinese Taipei) S-w Hsieh (Belgium) E Mertens	7^{7}	2	[8]
A Sasnovich (Germany) L Siegemund	6^{5}	6	[10]
(Norway) U Eikeri (Chinese Taipei) F-h Wu	3	7^{7}	[10]
7	(Chinese Taipei) H-c Chan (Mexico) G Olmos	6	6^{5}	[6]
3	(United States) N Melichar-Martinez (Australia) E Perez	6	6
M Andreeva (United States) S Kenin	2	1
(China) H Guo (China) X Jiang	3	7^{8}	[7]
WC	(France) C Garcia (France) K Mladenovic	6	6^{6}	[10]

Quarterfinals
A Sasnovich (Germany) L Siegemund	3	6	[10]
(Norway) U Eikeri (Chinese Taipei) F-h Wu	6	2	[4]
3	(United States) N Melichar-Martinez (Australia) E Perez	6^{1}	6	[12]
WC	(France) C Garcia (France) K Mladenovic	7^{7}	4	[10]

Semifinals
A Sasnovich (Germany) L Siegemund	3	2
3	(United States) N Melichar-Martinez (Australia) E Perez	6	6

=== Bottom half ===
First round
5	(Netherlands) D Schuurs (Brazil) L Stefani	6	3	[0]
(Hungary) T Babos (Czech Republic) M Bouzková	3	6	[10]
WC	(India) A Raina (India) P Thombare	6	3	[15]
PR	(Japan) S Aoyama (Serbia) A Krunić	4	6	[17]
(Japan) M Kato (Indonesia) A Sutjiadi	6	6
WC	(United Kingdom) S Grey (United Kingdom) E Silva	4	2
6	(Ukraine) L Kichenok (Latvia) J Ostapenko	7^{7}	6
(Netherlands) A Rus (China) Xin Wang	6^{5}	3
V Kudermetova; A Panova	6^{5}	2
(United States) A Parks (China) Y Xu	7^{7}	6
(Kazakhstan) A Danilina (China) S Zhang	6	6
(Brazil) I Gamarra Martins (Ukraine) N Kichenok	4	3

Second round
(Hungary) T Babos (Czech Republic) M Bouzková	4	5
PR	(Japan) S Aoyama (Serbia) A Krunić	6	7
(Japan) M Kato (Indonesia) A Sutjiadi	2	2
4	(Australia) S Hunter (Czech Republic) K Siniaková	6	6
6	(Ukraine) L Kichenok (Latvia) J Ostapenko	7^{7}	6
(United States) A Parks (China) Y Xu	6^{4}	3
(Kazakhstan) A Danilina (China) S Zhang	7	2	[6]
2	(Canada) G Dabrowski (New Zealand) E Routliffe	5	6	[10]

Quarterfinals
PR	(Japan) S Aoyama (Serbia) A Krunić	6^{3}	4
4	(Australia) S Hunter (Czech Republic) K Siniaková	7^{7}	6
6	(Ukraine) L Kichenok (Latvia) J Ostapenko	4	4
2	(Canada) G Dabrowski (New Zealand) E Routliffe	6	6

Semifinals
4	(Australia) S Hunter (Czech Republic) K Siniaková	6	6
2	(Canada) G Dabrowski (New Zealand) E Routliffe	4	4
