= 2026 Dubai Tennis Championships – Women's doubles =

Women's doubles
- 2026 Dubai Tennis Championships

Final
- Champions: (Canada) Gabriela Dabrowski (Brazil) Luisa Stefani
- Runners-up: (Germany) Laura Siegemund; Vera Zvonareva
- Score: 6–1, 6–3

Details
- Draw: 28
- Seeds: 8

Events
Singles	men	women
Doubles	men	women
- Dubai Tennis Championships

Gabriela Dabrowski and Luisa Stefani defeated Laura Siegemund and Vera Zvonareva in the final, 6–1, 6–3 to win the women's doubles tennis title at the 2026 Dubai Tennis Championships.

Kateřina Siniaková and Taylor Townsend were the two-time reigning champions, but Townsend did not participate this year. Siniaková partnered Storm Hunter, but lost in the quarterfinals to Siegemund and Zvonareva.

== Seeds ==
The top four seeds received a bye into the second round.

1. (Italy) Sara Errani / (Italy) Jasmine Paolini (second round)
2. (Belgium) Elise Mertens / (China) Zhang Shuai (second round)
3. (Chinese Taipei) Hsieh Su-wei / (Latvia) Jeļena Ostapenko (withdrew)
4. (Kazakhstan) Anna Danilina / (Serbia) Aleksandra Krunić (semifinals)
5. (Canada) Gabriela Dabrowski / (Brazil) Luisa Stefani (champions)
6. (United States) Asia Muhammad / (New Zealand) Erin Routliffe (first round)
7. (Australia) Storm Hunter / (Czech Republic) Kateřina Siniaková (quarterfinals)
8. (Spain) Cristina Bucșa / (United States) Nicole Melichar-Martinez (second round)

== Draw ==
Key

- Q = Qualifier
- WC = Wild card
- LL = Lucky loser
- Alt = Alternate
- ITF = ITF entry
- PR = Protected ranking
- SR = Special ranking
- SE = Special exempt
- JE = Junior exempt
- JR = Junior Accelerator Programme entrant
- CO = College Accelerator Programme entrant
- NG = Next Gen Accelerator Program entrant
- w/o = Walkover
- r = Retired
- d = Defaulted

=== Finals ===
Semifinals
PR	(Germany) Laura Siegemund; Vera Zvonareva	6	7^{8}
(Romania) Jaqueline Cristian (Romania) Elena-Gabriela Ruse	3	6^{6}
4	(Kazakhstan) Anna Danilina (Serbia) Aleksandra Krunić	6	2	[6]
5	(Canada) Gabriela Dabrowski (Brazil) Luisa Stefani	4	6	[10]

Final
PR	(Germany) Laura Siegemund; Vera Zvonareva	1	3
5	(Canada) Gabriela Dabrowski (Brazil) Luisa Stefani	6	6

=== Top half ===
First round
PR	(Germany) L Siegemund; V Zvonareva	6	6
Alt	(Croatia) P Marčinko (Croatia) A Ružić	3	1
(Australia) E Perez (Netherlands) D Schuurs	6	6
(China) Y Xu (China) Z Yang	2	1
PR	(Slovenia) A Klepač (Poland) K Piter	2	3
7	(Australia) S Hunter (Czech Republic) K Siniaková	6	6
PR	(Croatia) D Jurak Schreiber (Belgium) M Kempen	5	4
(Chinese Taipei) H-c Chan (Denmark) C Tauson	7	6
A Panova; D Shnaider	7	6
I Khromacheva (Indonesia) A Sutjiadi	5	2
(Romania) J Cristian (Romania) E-G Ruse	6	7^{7}
6	(United States) A Muhammad (New Zealand) E Routliffe	4	6^{1}

Second round
1	(Italy) S Errani (Italy) J Paolini	4	1
PR	(Germany) L Siegemund; V Zvonareva	6	6
(Australia) E Perez (Netherlands) D Schuurs	5	5
7	(Australia) S Hunter (Czech Republic) K Siniaková	7	7
Alt	E Ovcharenko; E Yashina	3	3
(Chinese Taipei) H-c Chan (Denmark) C Tauson	6	6
A Panova; D Shnaider	7^{10}	3	[7]
(Romania) J Cristian (Romania) E-G Ruse	6^{8}	6	[10]

Quarterfinals
PR	(Germany) L Siegemund; V Zvonareva	7^{7}	6
7	(Australia) S Hunter (Czech Republic) K Siniaková	6^{4}	4
(Chinese Taipei) H-c Chan (Denmark) C Tauson	6	2	[8]
(Romania) J Cristian (Romania) E-G Ruse	3	6	[10]

Semifinals
PR	(Germany) L Siegemund; V Zvonareva	6	7^{8}
(Romania) J Cristian (Romania) E-G Ruse	3	6^{6}

=== Bottom half ===
First round
8	(Spain) C Bucșa (United States) N Melichar-Martinez	6	6
(France) V Gracheva (United States) S Kenin	2	2
(Japan) M Kato (Hungary) F Stollár	4	4
(Ukraine) L Kichenok (United States) D Krawczyk	6	6
(Japan) E Hozumi (Chinese Taipei) F-h Wu	5	2
WC	(India) R Bhosale (Thailand) P Plipuech	7	6
5	(Canada) G Dabrowski (Brazil) L Stefani	6	6
WC	(Australia) K Birrell (Australia) M Joint	3	4
(Norway) U Eikeri (China) X Jiang	2	6	[5]
(Czech Republic) M Bouzková (Indonesia) J Tjen	6	4	[10]
(Mexico) G Olmos (United States) J Pegula	6	6
(Slovakia) T Mihalíková (United Kingdom) O Nicholls	4	3

Second round
8	(Spain) C Bucșa (United States) N Melichar-Martinez	2	6	[14]
(Ukraine) L Kichenok (United States) D Krawczyk	6	1	[16]
WC	(India) R Bhosale (Thailand) P Plipuech	3	6^{4}
4	(Kazakhstan) A Danilina (Serbia) A Krunić	6	7^{7}
5	(Canada) G Dabrowski (Brazil) L Stefani	6	3	[10]
(Czech Republic) M Bouzková (Indonesia) J Tjen	1	6	[3]
(Mexico) G Olmos (United States) J Pegula	6	6
2	(Belgium) E Mertens (China) S Zhang	3	3

Quarterfinals
(Ukraine) L Kichenok (United States) D Krawczyk	1	6	[6]
4	(Kazakhstan) A Danilina (Serbia) A Krunić	6	4	[10]
5	(Canada) G Dabrowski (Brazil) L Stefani	6	4	[14]
(Mexico) G Olmos (United States) J Pegula	2	6	[12]

Semifinals
4	(Kazakhstan) A Danilina (Serbia) A Krunić	6	2	[6]
5	(Canada) G Dabrowski (Brazil) L Stefani	4	6	[10]
