= 2021 Vesuvio Cup =

- Date: 11–17 October
- Edition: 1st
- Surface: Clay
- Location: Ercolano, Italy

Champions

Singles
- (Netherlands) Tallon Griekspoor

Doubles
- (Italy) Marco Bortolotti / (Spain) Sergio Martos Gornés
Vesuvio Cup	· 2022 →

The 2021 Vesuvio Cup was a professional tennis tournament played on clay courts. It was the first edition of the tournament which was part of the 2021 ATP Challenger Tour. It took place in Ercolano, Italy between 11 and 17 October 2021.

== Singles main-draw entrants ==
=== Seeds ===
Country	Player	Rank^{1}	Seed
ARG	Federico Coria	67	1
ITA	Marco Cecchinato	82	2
FRA	Hugo Gaston	112	3
~~SVK~~	~~Alex Molčan~~	~~117~~	~~4~~
NED	Tallon Griekspoor	118	5
SVK	Andrej Martin	120	6
ESP	Bernabé Zapata Miralles	122	7
GER	Yannick Hanfmann	125	8

- ^{1} Rankings are as of 4 October 2021.

=== Other entrants ===
The following players received wildcards into the singles main draw:

- (Italy) Matteo Arnaldi
- (Italy) Jacopo Berrettini
- (Italy) Raúl Brancaccio

The following player received entry into the singles main draw using a protected ranking:

- (Italy) Filippo Baldi

The following player received entry into the singles main draw as an alternate:

- (Italy) Andrea Arnaboldi

The following players received entry from the qualifying draw:

- (Italy) Luciano Darderi
- (Czech Republic) Jonáš Forejtek
- (Spain) Álvaro López San Martín
- (United States) Alexander Ritschard

The following player received entry as a lucky loser:

- (France) Evan Furness

== Champions ==
=== Singles ===
- (Netherlands) Tallon Griekspoor def. (United States) Alexander Ritschard 6–3, 6–2.

=== Doubles ===
- (Italy) Marco Bortolotti / (Spain) Sergio Martos Gornés def. (Germany) Dustin Brown / (Italy) Andrea Vavassori 6–4, 3–6, [10–7].
