= 2026 Dubai Tennis Championships – Women's singles =

Women's singles
- 2026 Dubai Tennis Championships

Final
- Champion: (United States) Jessica Pegula
- Runner-up: (Ukraine) Elina Svitolina
- Score: 6–2, 6–4

Details
- Draw: 56 (8Q / 4WC)
- Seeds: 16

Events
Singles	men	women
Doubles	men	women
- Dubai Tennis Championships

Jessica Pegula defeated Elina Svitolina in the final, 6–2, 6–4 to win the women's singles tennis title at the 2026 Dubai Tennis Championships. It was her fourth WTA 1000 singles title and 10th WTA Tour singles title overall.

Mirra Andreeva was the defending champion, but lost in the quarterfinals to Amanda Anisimova.

By reaching the final, Svitolina set the record for the longest gap (7 years, 277 days) between successive appearances in a WTA 1000-level final since the format was established in 2009, her previous final at such a level having been at the 2018 Italian Open.

== Seeds ==
The top eight seeds received a bye into the second round.

1. (Kazakhstan) Elena Rybakina (third round, retired)
2. (United States) Amanda Anisimova (semifinals)
3. (United States) Coco Gauff (semifinals)
4. (United States) Jessica Pegula (champion)
5. Mirra Andreeva (quarterfinals)
6. (Italy) Jasmine Paolini (second round)
7. (Ukraine) Elina Svitolina (final)
8. Ekaterina Alexandrova (second round)
9. (Switzerland) Belinda Bencic (third round)
10. (Czech Republic) Linda Nosková (second round)
11. (Canada) Victoria Mboko (withdrew)
12. (Denmark) Clara Tauson (quarterfinals)
13. Liudmila Samsonova (first round)
14. (United States) Emma Navarro (second round)
15. (Czech Republic) Karolína Muchová (withdrew)
16. (United States) Iva Jovic (third round)

Click on the seed number of a player to go to their draw section.

== Draw ==
Key

- Q = Qualifier
- WC = Wild card
- LL = Lucky loser
- Alt = Alternate
- ITF = ITF entry
- PR = Protected ranking
- SR = Special ranking
- SE = Special exempt
- JE = Junior exempt
- JR = Junior Accelerator Programme entrant
- CO = College Accelerator Programme entrant
- NG = Next Gen Accelerator Program entrant
- w/o = Walkover
- r = Retired
- d = Defaulted

=== Finals ===
Quarterfinals
LL	(Croatia) Antonia Ružić	6	2	3
7	(Ukraine) Elina Svitolina	3	6	6
3	(United States) Coco Gauff	6	6
(Philippines) Alexandra Eala	0	2
12	(Denmark) Clara Tauson	3	6	4
4	(United States) Jessica Pegula	6	2	6
5	Mirra Andreeva	6	5	6^{4}
2	(United States) Amanda Anisimova	2	7	7^{7}

Semifinals
7	(Ukraine) Elina Svitolina	6	6^{13}	6
3	(United States) Coco Gauff	4	7^{15}	4
4	(United States) Jessica Pegula	1	6	6
2	(United States) Amanda Anisimova	6	4	3

Final
7	(Ukraine) Elina Svitolina	2	4
4	(United States) Jessica Pegula	6	6

=== Top half ===
==== Section 1 ====
First round
(Germany) T Maria	4	6	5
Q	(Australia) K Birrell	6	3	7
LL	(Croatia) A Ružić	6	5	6
(United Kingdom) E Raducanu	1	7	2
Q	(Japan) M Uchijima	2	4
LL	A Zakharova	6	6
9	(Switzerland) B Bencic	2	6	6
(Spain) J Bouzas Maneiro	6	1	2
WC	(Turkey) Z Sönmez	2	2
WC	(Czech Republic) S Bejlek	6	6
(Czech Republic) K Siniaková	3	5
(Spain) P Badosa	6	7

Second round
1	(Kazakhstan) E Rybakina	6	6
Q	(Australia) K Birrell	1	2
LL	(Croatia) A Ružić	6	6^{2}	6
LL	A Zakharova	1	7^{7}	1
9	(Switzerland) B Bencic	w/o
WC	(Czech Republic) S Bejlek
(Spain) P Badosa	4	0^{r}
7	(Ukraine) E Svitolina	6	0

Third round
1	(Kazakhstan) E Rybakina	7	4	0^{r}
LL	(Croatia) A Ružić	5	6	1
9	(Switzerland) B Bencic	6	1	3
7	(Ukraine) E Svitolina	4	6	6

Quarterfinals
LL	(Croatia) A Ružić	6	2	3
7	(Ukraine) E Svitolina	3	6	6

==== Section 2 ====
First round
(Latvia) J Ostapenko	6	1	4
A Kalinskaya	2	6	6
(Czech Republic) M Bouzková	2	2
(Belgium) E Mertens	6	6
Q	(Romania) E-G Ruse	4	5
14	(United States) E Navarro	6	7
10	(Czech Republic) L Nosková	6	5	6
(United States) A Li	3	7	4
(Romania) S Cîrstea	6	7^{8}
Q	A Sasnovich	3	6^{6}
LL	(United States) H Baptiste	4	1^{r}
(Philippines) A Eala	6	0

Second round
3	(United States) C Gauff	6	6
A Kalinskaya	4	4
(Belgium) E Mertens	6	6
14	(United States) E Navarro	2	2
10	(Czech Republic) L Nosková	1	4
(Romania) S Cîrstea	6	6
(Philippines) A Eala	6	7^{7}
6	(Italy) J Paolini	1	6^{5}

Third round
3	(United States) C Gauff	2	7^{11}	6
(Belgium) E Mertens	6	6^{9}	3
(Romania) S Cîrstea	5	4
(Philippines) A Eala	7	6

Quarterfinals
3	(United States) C Gauff	6	6
(Philippines) A Eala	0	2

=== Bottom half ===
==== Section 3 ====
First round
WC	(New Zealand) L Sun	6	4	1
(Poland) M Linette	4	6	6
LL	(United States) P Stearns	6	6
LL	(Poland) M Fręch	4	2
(United States) S Kenin	6^{4}	2
12	(Denmark) C Tauson	7^{7}	6
16	(United States) I Jovic	6	1	6
LL	(Uzbekistan) K Rakhimova	1	6	1
D Shnaider	6	6
(Australia) M Joint	4	1
Q	(France) V Gracheva	7	1	6
Q	(Slovakia) R Šramková	5	6	4

Second round
8	E Alexandrova	2	6	1
(Poland) M Linette	6	4	6
LL	(United States) P Stearns	2	4
12	(Denmark) C Tauson	6	6
16	(United States) I Jovic	6	1	6
D Shnaider	4	6	0
Q	(France) V Gracheva	4	0
4	(United States) J Pegula	6	6

Third round
(Poland) M Linette	4	2
12	(Denmark) C Tauson	6	6
16	(United States) I Jovic	4	2
4	(United States) J Pegula	6	6

Quarterfinals
12	(Denmark) C Tauson	3	6	4
4	(United States) J Pegula	6	2	6

==== Section 4 ====
First round
(Germany) L Siegemund	2	3
(Australia) D Kasatkina	6	6
Q	(Germany) E Seidel	6	6
(Spain) C Bucșa	1	4
(Romania) J Cristian	6	6
LL	(Croatia) P Marčinko	1	1
13	L Samsonova	7	5	3
(Canada) L Fernandez	5	7	6
(Ukraine) D Yastremska	4	1
WC	(Indonesia) J Tjen	6	6
A Pavlyuchenkova	4	4
PR	(Czech Republic) B Krejčíková	6	6

Second round
5	M Andreeva	w/o
(Australia) D Kasatkina
Q	(Germany) E Seidel	0	0^{r}
(Romania) J Cristian	6	0
(Canada) L Fernandez	6^{5}	4
WC	(Indonesia) J Tjen	7^{7}	6
PR	(Czech Republic) B Krejčíková
2	(United States) A Anisimova	w/o

Third round
5	M Andreeva	7	6
(Romania) J Cristian	5	3
WC	(Indonesia) J Tjen	1	3
2	(United States) A Anisimova	6	6

Quarterfinals
5	M Andreeva	6	5	6^{4}
2	(United States) A Anisimova	2	7	7^{7}

== Seeded players ==
The following are the seeded players. Seedings are based on WTA rankings as of 9 February 2026. Rankings and points before are as of 16 February 2026.

^{‡}	Champion
^{†}	Runner-up

Seed	Rank	Player	Points before	Points dropping	Points won	Points after	Status
1	3	(Kazakhstan) Elena Rybakina	7,523	390	120	7,253	Third round retired against (Croatia) Antonia Ružić [LL]
2	6	(United States) Amanda Anisimova	5,690	10	390	6,070	Semifinals lost to (United States) Jessica Pegula [4]
3	4	(United States) Coco Gauff	6,423	10	390	6,803	Semifinals lost to (Ukraine) Elina Svitolina [7]
4	5	(United States) Jessica Pegula^{‡}	5,888	120	1,000	6,768	Champion, defeated (Ukraine) Elina Svitolina [7]
5	7	Mirra Andreeva	4,786	1,000	215	4,001	Quarterfinals lost to (United States) Amanda Anisimova [2]
6	8	(Italy) Jasmine Paolini	4,157	120	10	4,047	Second round lost to (Philippines) Alexandra Eala
7	9	(Ukraine) Elina Svitolina^{†}	3,260	65	650	3,845	Runner-up, lost to (United States) Jessica Pegula [4]
8	12	Ekaterina Alexandrova	2,918	(108)^{∆}	(108)^{Ω}	2,918	Second round lost to (Poland) Magda Linette
9	13	(Switzerland) Belinda Bencic	2,843	65	120	2,898	Third round lost to (Ukraine) Elina Svitolina [7]
10	14	(Czech Republic) Linda Nosková	2,571	215	65	2,421	Second round lost to (Romania) Sorana Cîrstea
11	10	(Canada) Victoria Mboko	3,246	(32)^{∆}	(32)^{Ω}	3,246	Withdrew due to right elbow injury
12	15	(Denmark) Clara Tauson	2,530	650	215	2,095	Quarterfinals lost to (United States) Jessica Pegula [4]
13	18	Liudmila Samsonova	2,105	65	10	2,050	First round lost to (Canada) Leylah Fernandez
14	19	(United States) Emma Navarro	2,100	120	65	2,045	Second round lost to (Belgium) Elise Mertens
15	11	(Czech Republic) Karolína Muchová	3,058	390	0	2,668	Withdrew due to schedule change
16	20	(United States) Iva Jovic	2,008	(33)^{^}	120	2,095	Third round lost to (United States) Jessica Pegula [4]

∆ The player is defending points from her 18th best result.
Ω The player is keeping her 18th best result as it is higher than the Dubai result, which does not need to be counted in her ranking points.
^ The player did not qualify for the tournament in 2025 and is defending points from an ITF tournament instead.

=== Withdrawn seeded players ===
The following players would have been seeded, but withdrew before the tournament began.

Rank	Player	Points before	Points defending	Points after	Withdrawal reason
1	Aryna Sabalenka	10,990	120	10,870	Fatigue
2	(Poland) Iga Świątek	7,803	215	7,653	Schedule change
16	(Japan) Naomi Osaka	2,356	0	2,356	Abdominal injury
17	(United States) Madison Keys	2,351	0	2,351	Fatigue

== Other entry information ==
=== Wildcards ===
- (Czech Republic) Sára Bejlek
- (Turkey) Zeynep Sönmez
- (New Zealand) Lulu Sun
- (Indonesia) Janice Tjen

=== Protected ranking ===
- (Czech Republic) Barbora Krejčíková

=== Withdrawals ===
- ‡ (France) Loïs Boisson → replaced by (Australia) Daria Kasatkina
- § (Italy) Elisabetta Cocciaretto → replaced by (Croatia) Antonia Ružić (LL)
- ‡ (United States) McCartney Kessler → replaced by (Germany) Laura Siegemund
- ‡ (United States) Madison Keys → replaced by (Czech Republic) Kateřina Siniaková
- ‡ (Ukraine) Marta Kostyuk → replaced by (Poland) Magda Linette
- ‡ Veronika Kudermetova → replaced by (Czech Republic) Marie Bouzková
- ‡ (Germany) Eva Lys → replaced by (Germany) Tatjana Maria
- § (Canada) Victoria Mboko → replaced by (Croatia) Petra Marčinko (LL)
- § (Czech Republic) Karolína Muchová → replaced by Anastasia Zakharova (LL)
- ‡ (Japan) Naomi Osaka → replaced by (Philippines) Alexandra Eala
- ‡ (Czech Republic) Karolína Plíšková → replaced by (Spain) Cristina Bucșa
- ‡ Aryna Sabalenka → replaced by (United States) Hailey Baptiste (LL)
- § (Greece) Maria Sakkari → replaced by (Uzbekistan) Kamilla Rakhimova (LL)
- ‡ (Poland) Iga Świątek → replaced by (United States) Peyton Stearns (LL)
- ‡ (Czech Republic) Markéta Vondroušová → replaced by Anastasia Pavlyuchenkova
- § (China) Zheng Qinwen → replaced by (Poland) Magdalena Fręch (LL)

‡ – withdrew from entry list
§ – withdrew from main draw

== Qualifying ==
=== Seeds ===
1. (United States) Hailey Baptiste (qualifying competition, lucky loser)
2. (Czech Republic) Tereza Valentová (first round, retired)
3. (United Kingdom) Sonay Kartal (qualifying competition)
4. (United States) Peyton Stearns (qualifying competition, lucky loser)
5. (Italy) Elisabetta Cocciaretto (qualified, withdrew)
6. (Poland) Magdalena Fręch (qualifying competition, lucky loser)
7. (France) Elsa Jacquemot (first round)
8. (Argentina) Solana Sierra (first round)
9. (Hungary) Anna Bondár (first round)
10. (Croatia) Antonia Ružić (first round, lucky loser)
11. (Croatia) Petra Marčinko (first round, lucky loser)
12. (Romania) Elena-Gabriela Ruse (qualified)
13. (France) Varvara Gracheva (qualified)
14. (Austria) Anastasia Potapova (first round)
15. (United States) Alycia Parks (first round)
16. (Austria) Julia Grabher (first round)

=== Qualifiers ===
1. (Slovakia) Rebecca Šramková
2. (Australia) Kimberly Birrell
3. Aliaksandra Sasnovich
4. (Romania) Elena-Gabriela Ruse
5. ~~(Italy) Elisabetta Cocciaretto~~
6. (France) Varvara Gracheva
7. (Japan) Moyuka Uchijima
8. (Germany) Ella Seidel

=== Lucky losers ===
1. (United States) Hailey Baptiste
2. (United States) Peyton Stearns
3. (Poland) Magdalena Fręch
4. Anastasia Zakharova
5. (Uzbekistan) Kamilla Rakhimova
6. (Croatia) Antonia Ružić
7. (Croatia) Petra Marčinko

=== Qualifying draw ===
==== First qualifier ====
First round
1	(United States) Hailey Baptiste	6	6
(China) Zhang Shuai	4	4
(Slovakia) Rebecca Šramková	5	7	6
10	(Croatia) Antonia Ružić	7	5	1

Qualifying competition
1	(United States) Hailey Baptiste	3	5
(Slovakia) Rebecca Šramková	6	7

==== Second qualifier ====
First round
2	(Czech Republic) Tereza Valentová	6	3	0^{r}
(Australia) Kimberly Birrell	0	6	5
(United States) Katie Volynets	7^{7}	6
15	(United States) Alycia Parks	6^{5}	0

Qualifying competition
(Australia) Kimberly Birrell	6	6
(United States) Katie Volynets	3	1

==== Third qualifier ====
First round
3	(United Kingdom) Sonay Kartal	6	6
WC	(Australia) Storm Hunter	4	1
Aliaksandra Sasnovich	6	6
11	(Croatia) Petra Marčinko	4	4

Qualifying competition
3	(United Kingdom) Sonay Kartal	4	3
Aliaksandra Sasnovich	6	6

==== Fourth qualifier ====
First round
4	(United States) Peyton Stearns	6	3	6
WC	Vera Zvonareva	4	6	4
(Ukraine) Yuliia Starodubtseva	2	7^{7}	1
12	(Romania) Elena-Gabriela Ruse	6	6^{3}	6

Qualifying competition
4	(United States) Peyton Stearns	2	6	4
12	(Romania) Elena-Gabriela Ruse	6	4	6

==== Fifth qualifier ====
First round
5	(Italy) Elisabetta Cocciaretto	0	6	6
(Croatia) Donna Vekić	6	3	2
Anastasia Zakharova	6	6
16	(Austria) Julia Grabher	2	4

Qualifying competition
5	(Italy) Elisabetta Cocciaretto	6	6^{3}	7
Anastasia Zakharova	2	7^{7}	5

==== Sixth qualifier ====
First round
6	(Poland) Magdalena Fręch	6	6
WC	Ekaterina Yashina	4	2
WC	(Australia) Priscilla Hon	4	4
13	(France) Varvara Gracheva	6	6

Qualifying competition
6	(Poland) Magdalena Fręch	4	6	5
13	(France) Varvara Gracheva	6	4	7

==== Seventh qualifier ====
First round
7	(France) Elsa Jacquemot	3	6	0
(Slovenia) Veronika Erjavec	6	3	6
(Japan) Moyuka Uchijima	6	6
9	(Hungary) Anna Bondár	3	1

Qualifying competition
(Slovenia) Veronika Erjavec	6^{5}	3
(Japan) Moyuka Uchijima	7^{7}	6

==== Eighth qualifier ====
First round
8	(Argentina) Solana Sierra	3	6^{4}
(Uzbekistan) Kamilla Rakhimova	6	7^{7}
(Germany) Ella Seidel	6	6
14	(Austria) Anastasia Potapova	4	3

Qualifying competition
(Uzbekistan) Kamilla Rakhimova	6	6^{5}	4
(Germany) Ella Seidel	1	7^{7}	6
