= 2021 Slovak Open II – Doubles =

Doubles
- 2021 Slovak Open II

Final
- Champions: (Slovakia) Filip Horanský (Ukraine) Sergiy Stakhovsky
- Runners-up: (Ukraine) Denys Molchanov (Kazakhstan) Aleksandr Nedovyesov
- Score: 6–4, 6–4

Events
Singles	Doubles
- Slovak Open

Harri Heliövaara and Emil Ruusuvuori were the defending champions but chose not to defend their title.

Filip Horanský and Sergiy Stakhovsky won the title after defeating Denys Molchanov and Aleksandr Nedovyesov 6–4, 6–4 in the final.

== Seeds ==
1. (Czech Republic) Roman Jebavý / (United Kingdom) Jonny O'Mara (quarterfinals)
2. (Ukraine) Denys Molchanov / (Kazakhstan) Aleksandr Nedovyesov (final)
3. (Netherlands) David Pel / (Netherlands) Sem Verbeek (first round)
4. (Poland) Szymon Walków / (Poland) Jan Zieliński (first round)

== Draw ==
Key

- Q = Qualifier
- WC = Wild card
- LL = Lucky loser
- Alt = Alternate
- ITF = ITF entry
- PR = Protected ranking
- SR = Special ranking
- SE = Special exempt
- JE = Junior exempt
- JR = Junior Accelerator Programme entrant
- CO = College Accelerator Programme entrant
- NG = Next Gen Accelerator Program entrant
- w/o = Walkover
- r = Retired
- d = Defaulted

First round
(Czech Republic) Z Kolář (Czech Republic) J Lehečka	6^{6}	7^{7}	[7]
(Slovakia) F Horanský (Ukraine) S Stakhovsky	7^{8}	6^{4}	[10]
4	(Poland) S Walków (Poland) J Zieliński	6	3	[5]
WC	(Slovakia) M Karol (Slovakia) L Pokorný	2	6	[10]
(Netherlands) M Hermans (Finland) P Niklas-Salminen	4	2
(Portugal) F Ferreira Silva (Turkey) E Kırkın	6	6
WC	(Slovakia) Peter Naď (Slovakia) Peter Benjamín Privara	5	7^{7}	[10]
(Croatia) D Ajduković (Bosnia and Herzegovina) D Džumhur	7	6^{2}	[8]
(India) S Balaji (India) D Sharan	6	6
3	(Netherlands) D Pel (Netherlands) S Verbeek	3	4
WC	(Slovakia) Krištof Minárik (Slovakia) Lukáš Palovič	3	3
(Spain) S Martos Gornés (India) R Ramanathan	6	6

Quarterfinals
1	(Czech Republic) R Jebavý (United Kingdom) J O'Mara	6^{3}	3
(Slovakia) F Horanský (Ukraine) S Stakhovsky	7^{7}	6
WC	(Slovakia) M Karol (Slovakia) L Pokorný	6	1	[8]
(Portugal) F Ferreira Silva (Turkey) E Kırkın	4	6	[10]
WC	(Slovakia) P Naď (Slovakia) PB Privara	3	3
(India) S Balaji (India) D Sharan	6	6
(Spain) S Martos Gornés (India) R Ramanathan	4	4
2	(Ukraine) D Molchanov (Kazakhstan) A Nedovyesov	6	6

Semifinals
(Slovakia) F Horanský (Ukraine) S Stakhovsky	6^{5}	7^{7}	[14]
(Portugal) F Ferreira Silva (Turkey) E Kırkın	7^{7}	6^{2}	[12]
(India) S Balaji (India) D Sharan	2	3
2	(Ukraine) D Molchanov (Kazakhstan) A Nedovyesov	6	6

Final
(Slovakia) F Horanský (Ukraine) S Stakhovsky	6	6
2	(Ukraine) D Molchanov (Kazakhstan) A Nedovyesov	4	4
