= 2024 Dubai Tennis Championships – Men's singles =

Men's singles
- 2024 Dubai Tennis Championships

Final
- Champion: (France) Ugo Humbert
- Runner-up: (Kazakhstan) Alexander Bublik
- Score: 6–4, 6–3

Details
- Draw: 32 (3WC, 4Q)
- Seeds: 8

Events
Singles	men	women
Doubles	men	women
← 2023 ·	Dubai Tennis Championships	· 2025 →

Ugo Humbert defeated Alexander Bublik in the final, 6–4, 6–3 to win the men's singles tennis title at the 2024 Dubai Tennis Championships. He saved three match points (against Hubert Hurkacz in the quarterfinals) en route to his sixth career ATP Tour singles title in as many finals. Humbert became the third man in the Open Era to win his first six finals, following Ernests Gulbis and Martin Kližan.

Daniil Medvedev was the defending champion, but lost to Humbert in the semifinals.

== Seeds ==
1. Daniil Medvedev (semifinals)
2. Andrey Rublev (semifinals, defaulted)
3. (Poland) Hubert Hurkacz (quarterfinals)
4. Karen Khachanov (second round)
5. (France) Ugo Humbert (champion)
6. (France) Adrian Mannarino (first round)
7. (Kazakhstan) Alexander Bublik (final)
8. (Spain) Alejandro Davidovich Fokina (quarterfinals)

== Draw ==
=== Key ===
- Q = Qualifier
- WC = Wild card
- LL = Lucky loser
- Alt = Alternate
- ITF = ITF entry
- PR = Protected ranking
- SR = Special ranking
- SE = Special exempt
- JE = Junior exempt
- JR = Junior Accelerator Programme entrant
- CO = College Accelerator Programme entrant
- NG = Next Gen Accelerator Program entrant
- w/o = Walkover
- r = Retired
- d = Defaulted

=== Finals ===
Semifinals
1	Daniil Medvedev	5	3
5	(France) Ugo Humbert	7	6
7	(Kazakhstan) Alexander Bublik	6^{4}	7^{7}	6
2	Andrey Rublev	7^{7}	6^{5}	5^{d}

Final
5	(France) Ugo Humbert	6	6
7	(Kazakhstan) Alexander Bublik	4	3

=== Top half ===
First round
1	D Medvedev	6	7
(Kazakhstan) A Shevchenko	3	5
WC	(India) S Nagal	4	7	1
(Italy) L Sonego	6	5	6
SE	(Czech Republic) J Menšík	4	6	7^{9}
(Croatia) B Ćorić	6	3	6^{7}
(Hungary) F Marozsán	3	6	1
8	(Spain) A Davidovich Fokina	6	4	6
3	(Poland) H Hurkacz	7^{7}	6^{4}	7^{8}
(Germany) J-L Struff	6^{5}	7^{7}	6^{6}
Q	(Germany) M Marterer	2	4
(Australia) C O'Connell	6	6
PR	(Canada) D Shapovalov	6	6^{5}	3
(United Kingdom) A Murray	4	7^{7}	6
WC	(France) G Monfils	6	3	3
5	(France) U Humbert	4	6	6

Second round
1	D Medvedev	3	6	6
(Italy) L Sonego	6	3	3
SE	(Czech Republic) J Menšík	6^{7}	0^{r}
8	(Spain) A Davidovich Fokina	7^{9}	1
3	(Poland) H Hurkacz	7^{7}	6
(Australia) C O'Connell	6^{5}	4
(United Kingdom) A Murray	2	4
5	(France) U Humbert	6	6

Quarterfinals
1	D Medvedev	6	6
8	(Spain) A Davidovich Fokina	2	3
3	(Poland) H Hurkacz	6	6^{8}	3
5	(France) U Humbert	3	7^{10}	6

Semifinals
1	D Medvedev	5	3
5	(France) U Humbert	7	6

=== Bottom half ===
First round
7	(Kazakhstan) A Bublik	2	6	7^{7}
Q	(Czech Republic) T Macháč	6	3	6^{5}
(Netherlands) T Griekspoor	7	2
WC	(Jordan) A Shelbayh	5	0^{r}
(Czech Republic) J Lehečka	6	3	7
Q	(Hungary) M Fucsovics	4	6	5
LL	(France) L Van Assche	2	3
4	K Khachanov	6	6
6	(France) A Mannarino	6^{3}	5
(Netherlands) B van de Zandschulp	7^{7}	7
P Kotov	0	2
(United States) S Korda	6	6
(Italy) L Musetti	4	6^{2}
Q	(France) A Cazaux	6	7^{7}
(China) Z Zhang	7^{7}	2	4
2	A Rublev	6^{4}	6	6

Second round
7	(Kazakhstan) A Bublik	7^{10}	7^{7}
(Netherlands) T Griekspoor	6^{8}	6^{2}
(Czech Republic) J Lehečka	6^{6}	7^{7}	6
4	K Khachanov	7^{8}	6^{5}	4
(Netherlands) B van de Zandschulp	1	0
(United States) S Korda	6	6
Q	(France) A Cazaux	4	4
2	A Rublev	6	6

Quarterfinals
7	(Kazakhstan) A Bublik	6	4
(Czech Republic) J Lehečka	4	1^{r}
(United States) S Korda	4	3^{r}
2	A Rublev	6	4

Semifinals
7	(Kazakhstan) A Bublik	6^{4}	7^{7}	6
2	A Rublev	7^{7}	6^{5}	5^{d}

== Qualifying ==
=== Seeds ===
1. (Czech Republic) Tomáš Macháč (qualified)
2. (France) Luca Van Assche (qualifying competition, lucky loser)
3. (France) Alexandre Müller (first round)
4. (Hungary) Márton Fucsovics (qualified)
5. (France) Arthur Cazaux (qualified)
6. (Spain) Roberto Bautista Agut (qualifying competition)
7. (Germany) Maximilian Marterer (qualified)
8. (France) Richard Gasquet (qualifying competition)

=== Qualifiers ===
1. (Czech Republic) Tomáš Macháč
2. (Germany) Maximilian Marterer
3. (France) Arthur Cazaux
4. (Hungary) Márton Fucsovics

=== Lucky loser ===
1. (France) Luca Van Assche

=== Qualifying draw ===
==== First qualifier ====
First round
1	(Czech Republic) Tomáš Macháč	6	7
(Sweden) Elias Ymer	1	5
(France) Hugo Grenier	6^{4}	4
6	(Spain) Roberto Bautista Agut	7^{7}	6

Qualifying competition
1	(Czech Republic) Tomáš Macháč	6^{5}	6	6
6	(Spain) Roberto Bautista Agut	7^{7}	2	1

==== Second qualifier ====
First round
2	(France) Luca Van Assche	7^{7}	6
WC	(Tunisia) Aziz Dougaz	6^{3}	1
WC	(Turkey) Yankı Erel	3	4
7	(Germany) Maximilian Marterer	6	6

Qualifying competition
2	(France) Luca Van Assche	7	3	4
7	(Germany) Maximilian Marterer	5	6	6

==== Third qualifier ====
First round
3	(France) Alexandre Müller	6	4	2
(Italy) Giulio Zeppieri	1	6	6
(Bosnia and Herzegovina) Damir Džumhur	3	3
5	(France) Arthur Cazaux	6	6

Qualifying competition
(Italy) Giulio Zeppieri	6^{5}	4
5	(France) Arthur Cazaux	7^{7}	6

==== Fourth qualifier ====
First round
4	(Hungary) Márton Fucsovics	6	6
(United States) Maxime Cressy	4	1
WC	(Canada) Vasek Pospisil	6^{4}	3
8	(France) Richard Gasquet	7^{7}	6

Qualifying competition
4	(Hungary) Márton Fucsovics	4	6	6
8	(France) Richard Gasquet	6	1	4
