= Vesuvio Cup =

- 2021 Vesuvio Cup

ATP Challenger Tour
- Event name: Vesuvio Cup
- Location: Naples, Italy
- Venue: Sporting Poseidon
- Category: ATP Challenger Tour
- Surface: Clay
- Draw: 32S/32Q/16D

The Vesuvio Cup is a professional tennis tournament played on clay courts. It is currently part of the ATP Challenger Tour. It is held annually in Naples, Italy since 2021.

== Past finals ==
=== Singles ===
Year	Champion	Runner-up	Score
2021	(Netherlands) Tallon Griekspoor	(United States) Alexander Ritschard	6–3, 6–2

=== Doubles ===
Year	Champions	Runners-up	Score
2021	(Italy) Marco Bortolotti (Spain) Sergio Martos Gornés	(Germany) Dustin Brown (Italy) Andrea Vavassori	6–4, 3–6, [10–7]
