= Tallon Griekspoor =

Dutch tennis player (born 1996)

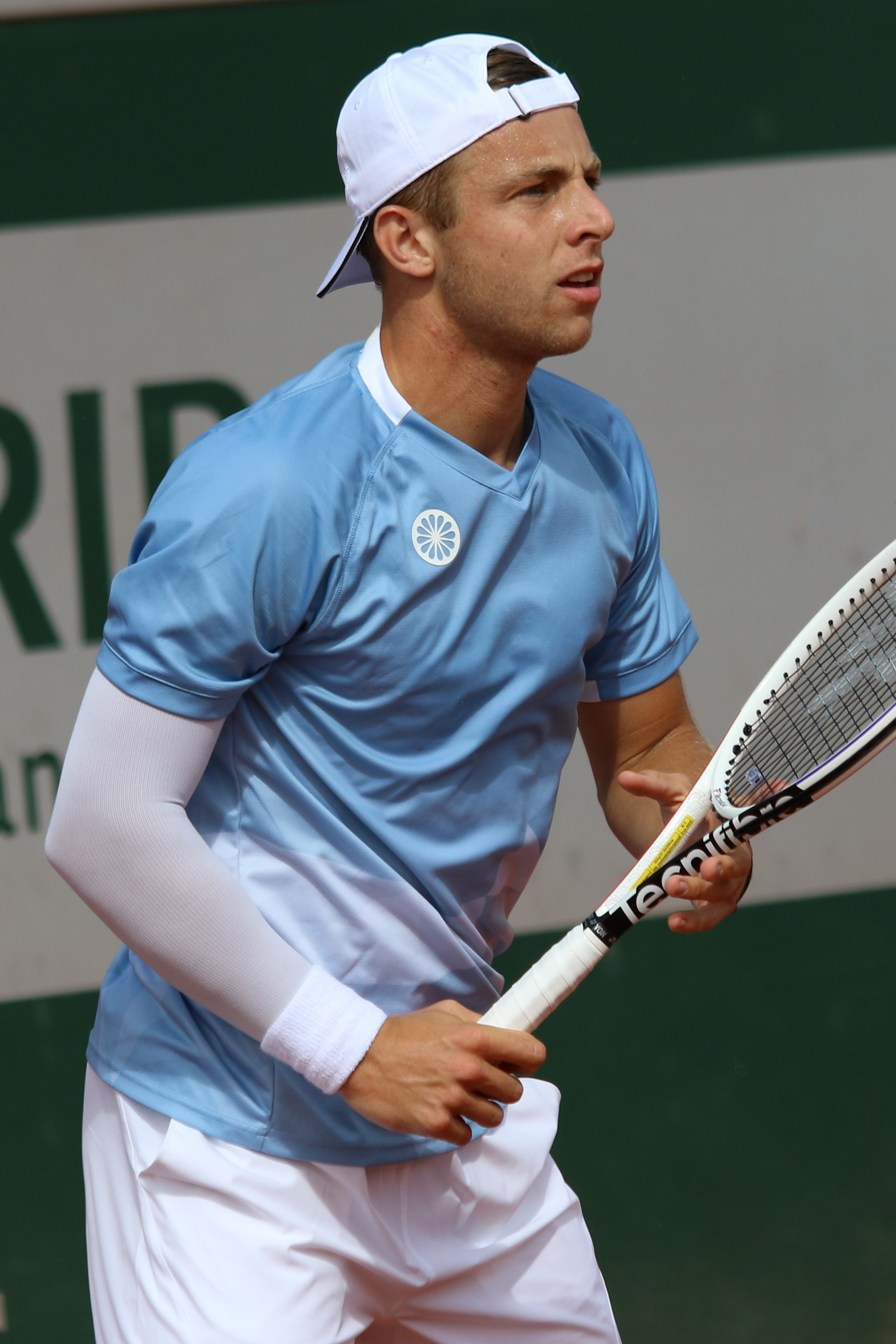
- Griekspoor at the 2022 French Open
- Country (sports): Netherlands
- Residence: Nieuw-Vennep, Netherlands
- Born: 2 July 1996 (age 30) Haarlem, Netherlands
- Height: 1.88 m (6 ft 2 in)
- Turned pro: 2015
- Plays: Right-handed (two-handed backhand)
- Coach: Dennis Sporrel (-May 2025)
- Prize money: US $8,663,912

Singles
- Career record: 141–138
- Career titles: 4
- Highest ranking: No. 21 (6 November 2023)
- Current ranking: No. 49 (9 November 2026)

Grand Slam singles results
- Australian Open: 3R (2023, 2024)
- French Open: 4R (2025)
- Wimbledon: 2R (2022, 2024)
- US Open: 3R (2024)

Other tournaments
- Olympic Games: 2R (2024)

Doubles
- Career record: 38–58
- Career titles: 2
- Highest ranking: No. 61 (10 June 2024)
- Current ranking: No. 141 (31 August 2026)

Grand Slam doubles results
- Australian Open: 3R (2025, 2026)
- French Open: 1R (2022, 2023, 2025)
- Wimbledon: QF (2023)
- US Open: 3R (2023)

Other doubles tournaments
- Olympic Games: 2R (2024)

Team competitions
- Davis Cup: F (2024)
- Last updated on: 31 August 2026.

Tallon Griekspoor (Dutch pronunciation: [ˈtɛlɔŋ ˈxrikspoːr]; born 2 July 1996) is a Dutch professional tennis player. He has a career-high ATP singles ranking of world No. 21, achieved in November 2023, and a best doubles ranking of No. 61, reached in June 2024. He is the current Dutch No. 2 in men's singles.

Griekspoor has won six ATP Tour titles combined, four in singles and two in doubles. He represents the Netherlands at the Davis Cup.

Griekspoor is notable for a record eight Challenger titles won in one season (2021), and the first player to earn five consecutive such titles.

== Early life and background ==
Griekspoor was born in Haarlem to father Ron and mother Monique, and grew up in Nieuw-Vennep. He has two older brothers, Scott and Kevin, who are twins. His grandfather Joop founded the construction company Griekspoor BV, where much of his family works.

Griekspoor and his brothers began playing tennis when he was six, training at the Nieuw-Vennep Tennis Club. At the age of 12, he began playing at the Zandvoort Tennis Club.

== Professional career ==
=== 2017–2019: ATP debut ===
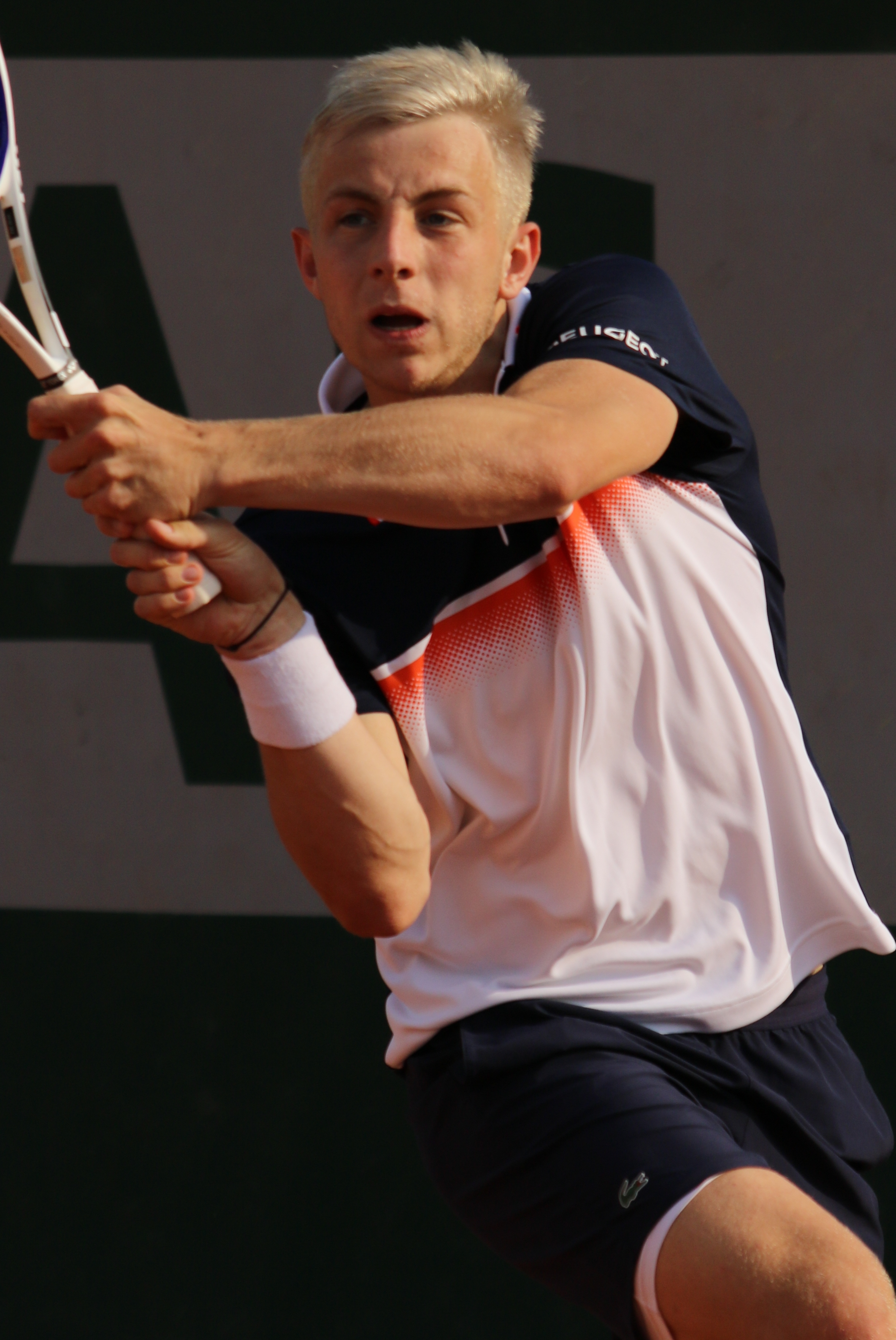
Griekspoor at the 2019 French Open

Griekspoor made his ATP main draw debut as a wildcard at the 2017 Rotterdam Open in the singles draw against Gilles Müller. In 2018, at the same tournament a year later, he upset fifth seed Stan Wawrinka in three sets to reach the second round as a wildcard. In 2019, Griekspoor upset second seed Karen Khachanov in the first round, again as a wildcard.

=== 2020–2021: Major debut, Challenger win record ===
Griekspoor qualified for his first Grand Slam at the 2020 Australian Open. He made his top 150 debut on 31 August 2020.

In 2021, Griekspoor won two Challenger tour titles at the Prague Open and at the Bratislava Open. He then qualified for the 2021 Wimbledon Championships, marking his debut at the tournament. Following Wimbledon, as the top seed, he reached the final of the Dutch Open in Amersfoort. He defeated his compatriot and No. 2 seed Botic van de Zandschulp in the final for his fifth Challenger title.

At the US Open, Griekspoor reached the second round of a Major for the first time in his career, defeating Jan-Lennard Struff in five sets. He then lost to top seed and world No. 1, Novak Djokovic, in the second round. In September, following the US Open, he won his sixth Challenger title and fourth of the year at the Murcia Open, defeating top seed Roberto Carballés Baena.

The following month, he won his fifth Challenger of the year at the Tennis Napoli Cup, defeating Andrea Pellegrino. The following week, also in Naples, he won his sixth Challenger title of the year at the Vesuvio Cup, defeating Alexander Ritschard. With this victory, Griekspoor tied Benjamin Bonzi for the most Challenger titles in 2021. In addition, he joined Facundo Bagnis (2016), Juan Ignacio Chela (2001) and Younes El Aynaoui (1998) as the only players to lift six singles trophies in one season on the ATP Challenger Tour. As a result, he reached the top 100 for the first time in his career.

He won his seventh Challenger title of the season in Tenerife, defeating Feliciano López in the final and becoming the sole record holder for most trophies at that level in a single year. He won his eighth Challenger at the Slovak Open II and reached a new career-high ranking of No. 64 on 22 November 2021.

=== 2022: Antwerp doubles title, top 50 ===
Griekspoor began his season at the Melbourne Summer Set 1, where he made the quarterfinals after beating seventh seed Dominik Koepfer and Alexei Popyrin. He withdrew from his quarterfinal match against Rafael Nadal due to a foot injury. At the Australian Open, he defeated Fabio Fognini in straight sets in the first round for his first win at the tournament. He lost to 19th seed Pablo Carreño Busta in the second round.

At his home tournament, the Rotterdam Open, he reached the second round as a wildcard, with a victory over seventh seed Aslan Karatsev, saving two match points in the process for his third top-20 win. He recorded a perfect 3–0 against top-15 players in his home tournament in Rotterdam. At the Geneva Open, he defeated sixth seed and world No. 33 Tommy Paul in the first round and home qualifier Johan Nikles in the second.

At the French Open, he defeated world No. 28 and 25th seed Alejandro Davidovich Fokina in the first round. At the Libéma Open, he reached the second round with a win over Aljaž Bedene. Following Wimbledon, where he also reached the second round with a win over Fabio Fognini, he made his debut in the top 50 at world No. 47 on 11 July 2022. The following week, he successfully defended his Challenger title at the Dutch Open as the top seed, defeating Roberto Carballés Baena in the final.

At the European Open in Antwerp, he won his maiden ATP doubles title with Botic van de Zandschulp.

=== 2023: Two ATP titles & top 10 win, Dutch No. 1 ===
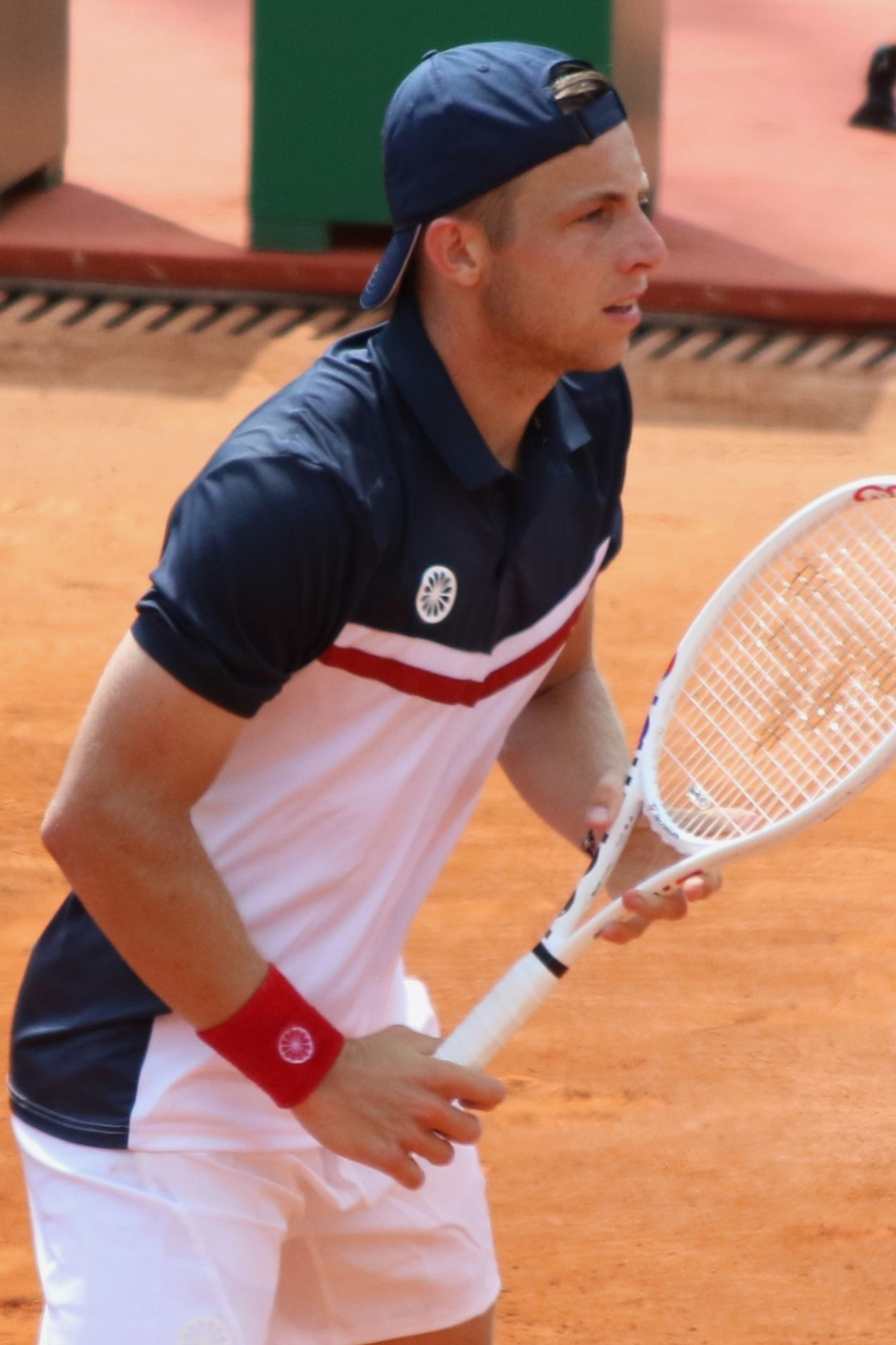
Griekspoor at the 2023 Monte-Carlo Masters

In Pune, Griekspoor reached his maiden ATP singles semifinal, beating Jaume Munar and Marco Cecchinato, then receiving a walkover against top seed Marin Čilić. He defeated 8th seed Aslan Karatsev in the semifinals in straight sets to reach the final, where he defeated Benjamin Bonzi in three sets to win his maiden ATP Tour singles title.

At the Australian Open, Griekspoor reached the third round of a Grand Slam for the first time in his career, beating Pavel Kotov and 32nd seed, compatriot Botic van de Zandschulp. He lost to third seed and eventual finalist Stefanos Tsitsipas in the third round.

Griekspoor made the quarterfinals in Rotterdam, after defeating Mikael Ymer and eight seed Alexander Zverev, his fourth top-20 win. He recorded a perfect 4–0 against top-20 players in his home tournament. Next he defeated Gijs Brouwer to reach his second semifinal of the season and overall and first career semifinal of an ATP 500 tournament. It was the first time since Igor Sijsling in 2014 (who also coincidentally was coached by Dennis Schenk) that a Dutch wildcard reached the semifinals at the home tournament. It was also the first time a Dutch duo, Griekspoor and Brouwer, reached the quarterfinals in singles of the home tournament, since Raemon Sluiter and Sjeng Schalken in 2003. He lost to Jannik Sinner in straight sets. As a result, he reached a new career-high ranking in the top 40.

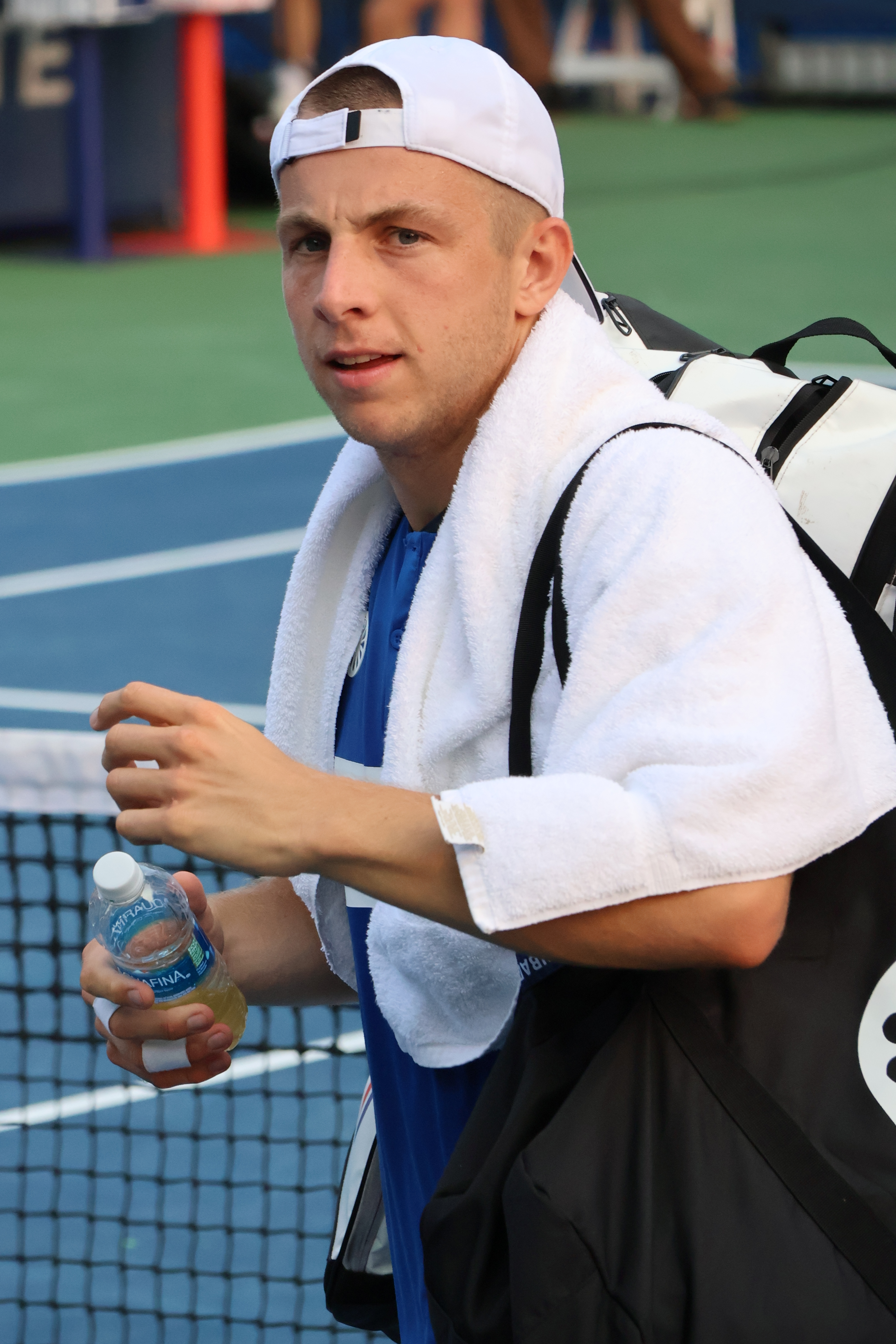
Griekspoor at the 2023 Citi Open

Seeded 31st at the BNP Paribas Open, he reached the third round of a Masters for the first time in his career, with a bye in the first round and a win over Guido Pella in the second. He lost to top seed and eventual champion Carlos Alcaraz. He reached the top 35 on 3 April 2023.

At the Libéma Open, he defeated Mikael Ymer and Alexei Popyrin to reach the quarterfinals. He reached the semifinals with an upset over fourth seed Alex de Minaur. He reached the second final of his career with a win over Emil Ruusuvuori, and won his second ATP title with a win over Jordan Thompson in the final. With this win, he became the Dutch No. 1 and reached the top 30. At the Halle Open, he upset defending champion Hubert Hurkacz to reach back-to-back quarterfinals on grass. At Wimbledon, he lost to Márton Fucsovics in the first round.

Seeded 12th at the Citi Open in Washington, he defeated Liam Broady, Gaël Monfils, and J. J. Wolf to reach the second ATP 500 semifinal of his career. He then upset top seed and world No. 9 Taylor Fritz for his first career top 10 victory to advance to his third final of 2023 and first at ATP 500 Level. He lost to Dan Evans in the final.

He reached the quarterfinals at both the Astana Open and the Stockholm Open. He reached the third round of a Masters 1000 for the first time on his debut in Paris, where he lost to world No. 1 Novak Djokovic, but reached a new career-high ranking of No. 21 on 6 November 2023.

=== 2024: Australian third round, Davis Cup finalist ===
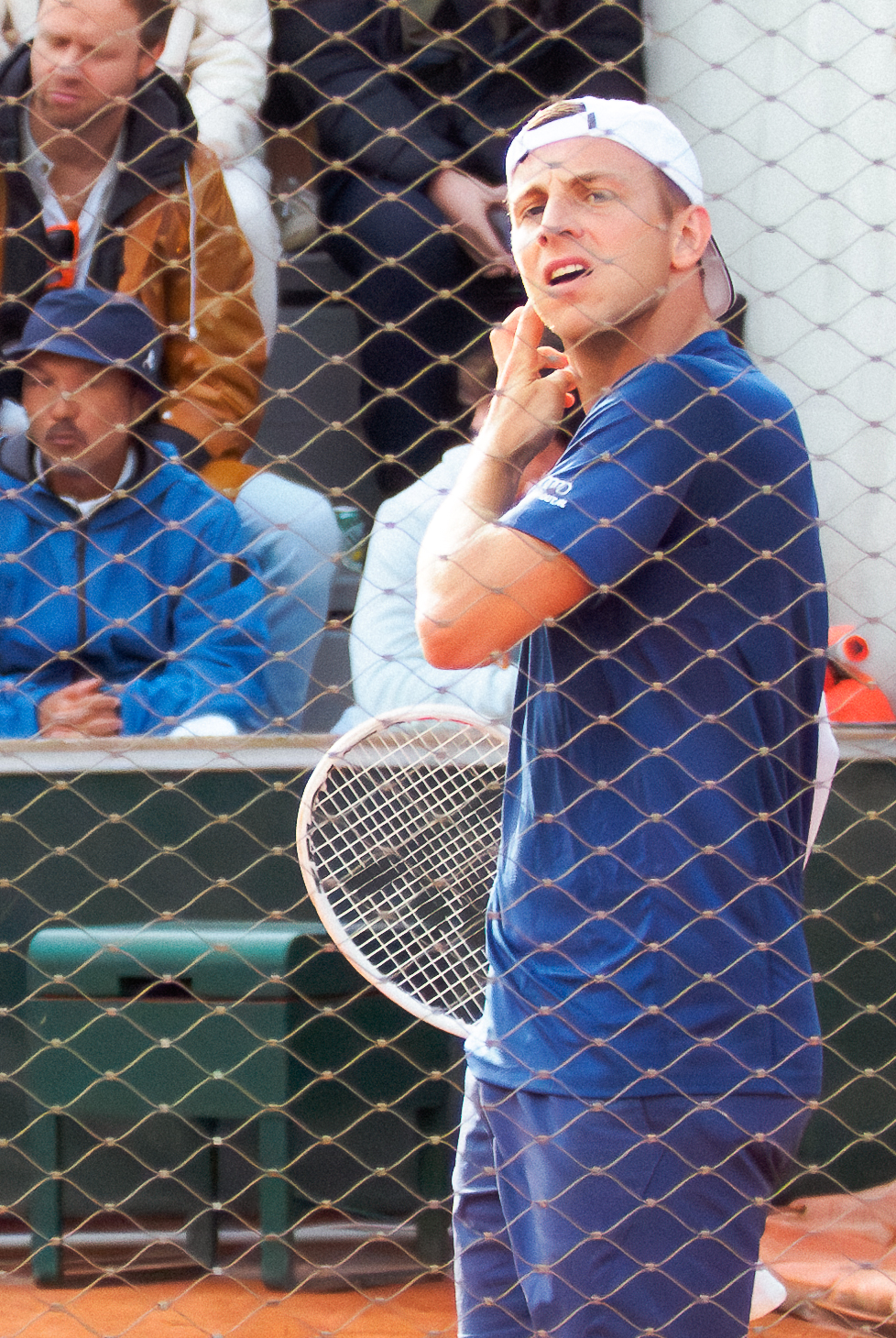
Griekspoor at the 2024 French Open

Seeded 28th at the 2024 Australian Open, Griekspoor defeated Roman Safiullin and Arthur Fils to reach back-to-back third rounds at the tournament. In Rotterdam, he recorded another first round victory over Lorenzo Musetti, saving two match points in the process. He reached the quarterfinals with an upset over fourth seed Hubert Hurkacz. At the Dubai Tennis Championships, he won his first ATP 500 doubles title with Jan-Lennard Struff. Seeded 27th, he reached the third round of Indian Wells with a win over Yannick Hanfmann before losing to sixth seed Alexander Zverev. In Miami he also reached the third round with a win over Alex Michelsen in three tight sets, before losing to second seed and eventual champion Jannik Sinner.

He reached the second round of the Monte-Carlo Masters with a win over Dominik Koepfer, before losing to 11th seed Alex de Minaur. At the Madrid Open, he beat Taro Daniel and upset seventh seed Holger Rune to reach the fourth round of a Masters tournament for the first time in his career. Seeded 26th at the French Open, he defeated Mackenzie McDonald and Luciano Darderi before losing to fourth seed and eventual runner-up Alexander Zverev.

On 22 November, Griekspoor helped the Netherlands reach the final at the 2024 Davis Cup for the first time in their country's history, after him and Botic van de Zandschulp defeated Germany in the two singles matches.

=== 2025: ATP 1000 quarterfinal, 100th career win ===
In the beginning of 2025, ranked No. 47 in Dubai, Griekspoor defeated Roman Safiullin saving three match points, and then defending champion and fifth seed Ugo Humbert to reach his first ATP 500-level quarterfinal of the season. Next he reached the semifinals, defeating former champion, world No. 6 and top seed Daniil Medvedev, saving four match points, for the biggest win by ranking and also recording his 100th career win.

At the 2025 BNP Paribas Open, in the second round, Griekspoor took out the world No. 2 and top seed Alexander Zverev after having five match points, winning on the sixth, in three sets with two tiebreaks, having lost to him in his five previous meetings. It was his first top 5 win in his career. He followed that by defeating 29th seed Giovanni Mpetshi Perricard to reach the fourth round at the tournament for the first time. He reached his first Masters quarterfinal and first at this level for a Dutchman at the tournament in 25 years (since Sjeng Schalken in 2000), defeating qualifier Yosuke Watanuki in straight sets. Griekspoor was only the fifth Dutchman to accomplish the feat.

== Performance timeline ==
Key
W	F	SF	QF	#R	RR	Q#	DNQ	A	NH

(W) winner; (F) finalist; (SF) semifinalist; (QF) quarterfinalist; (#R) rounds 4, 3, 2, 1; (RR) round-robin stage; (Q#) qualification round; (DNQ) did not qualify; (A) absent; (NH) not held; (SR) strike rate (events won / competed); (W–L) win–loss record.
To avoid confusion and double counting, these charts are updated at the conclusion of a tournament or when the player's participation has ended.

Current through the 2026 Shanghai Masters.

Tournament	2017	2018	2019	2020	2021	2022	2023	2024	2025	2026	SR	W–L	Win %
Grand Slam tournaments
Australian Open	A	A	Q1	1R	Q2	2R	3R	3R	1R	1R	0 / 6	5–6	45%
French Open	A	Q1	Q1	Q1	Q2	2R	2R	3R	4R	1R	0 / 5	7–5	58%
Wimbledon	A	Q1	Q2	NH	1R	2R	1R	2R	1R	1R	0 / 6	2–6	25%
US Open	A	A	Q3	A	2R	1R	1R	3R	1R	1R	0 / 6	3–6	33%
Win–loss	0–0	0–0	0–0	0–1	1–2	3–4	3–4	7–4	3–4	0–4	0 / 23	17–23	43%
National representation
Summer Olympics	NH				A	NH		2R	NH		0 / 1	1–1	50%
Davis Cup	A	A	RR	A	WG1	QF	QF	F	A	WG1	0 / 4	12–11	52%
ATP 1000 tournaments
Indian Wells Open	A	A	A	NH	A	1R	3R	3R	QF	A	0 / 4	6–4	60%
Miami Open	A	A	A	NH	A	1R	A	3R	A	A	0 / 2	1–2	33%
Monte-Carlo Masters	A	A	A	NH	A	1R	1R	2R	1R	1R	0 / 5	1–5	17%
Madrid Open	A	A	A	NH	A	A	2R	4R	2R	3R	0 / 4	4–4	50%
Italian Open	A	A	A	A	A	1R	A	2R	2R	2R	0 / 4	1–4	20%
Canadian Open	A	A	A	NH	A	A	1R	1R	2R	4R	0 / 4	3–4	43%
Cincinnati Open	A	A	A	A	A	A	1R	1R	2R	A	0 / 3	0–3	0%
Shanghai Masters	A	A	A	NH			2R	3R	4R	1R	0 / 4	4–4	50%
Paris Masters	A	A	A	A	A	Q2	3R	2R	1R	Q1	0 / 3	3–3	50%
Win–loss	0–0	0–0	0–0	0–0	0–0	0–4	3–7	8–9	8–8	4–5	0 / 33	23–33	41%
Career statistics
Tournaments	2	1	1	2	6	24	19	24	25	20	124		
Titles / Finals	0 / 0	0 / 0	0 / 0	0 / 0	0 / 0	0 / 0	2 / 3	0 / 0	1 / 2	0 / 1	3 / 6		
Overall win–loss	0–2	1–1	1–3	0–3	5–6	17–25	36–24	33–30	30–23	13–21	136–138		
Win %	0%	50%	25%	0%	45%	40%	60%	52%	57%	38%	50%		
Year-end ranking	232	231	178	153	64	96	23	40	26		$8,513,654		

== ATP Tour finals ==
=== Singles: 7 (4 titles, 3 runner-ups) ===
Legend Grand Slam (–) ATP 1000 (–) ATP 500 (0–2) ATP 250 (4–1)	Finals by surface Hard (2–2) Clay (0–1) Grass (2–0)	Finals by setting Outdoor (3–3) Indoor (1–0)

Result	W–L	Date	Tournament	Tier	Surface	Opponent	Score
Win	1–0	Jan 2023	Maharashtra Open, India	ATP 250	Hard	(France) Benjamin Bonzi	4–6, 7–5, 6–3
Win	2–0	Jun 2023	Libéma Open, Netherlands	ATP 250	Grass	(Australia) Jordan Thompson	6–7^{(4–7)}, 7–6^{(7–3)}, 6–3
Loss	2–1	Aug 2023	Washington Open, US	ATP 500	Hard	(United Kingdom) Dan Evans	5–7, 3–6
Loss	2–2	Apr 2025	Grand Prix Hassan II, Morocco	ATP 250	Clay	(Italy) Luciano Darderi	6–7^{(3–7)}, 6–7^{(4–7)}
Win	3–2	Jun 2025	Mallorca Championships, Spain	ATP 250	Grass	(France) Corentin Moutet	7–5, 7–6^{(7–3)}
Loss	3–3	Feb 2026	Dubai Tennis Championships, UAE	ATP 500	Hard	Daniil Medvedev	walkover
Win	4–3	Oct 2026	European Open, Belgium	ATP 250	Hard (i)	(Germany) Jan-Lennard Struff	4–6, 6–3, 6–4

=== Doubles: 3 (2 titles, 1 runner-up) ===
Legend Grand Slam (–) ATP 1000 (–) ATP 500 (1–0) ATP 250 (1–1)	Finals by surface Hard (2–1) Clay (–) Grass (–)	Finals by setting Outdoor (1–0) Indoor (1–1)

Result	W–L	Date	Tournament	Tier	Surface	Partner	Opponents	Score
Win	1–0	Oct 2022	European Open, Belgium	ATP 250	Hard (i)	(Netherlands) Botic van de Zandschulp	(India) Rohan Bopanna (Netherlands) Matwé Middelkoop	3–6, 6–3, [10–5]
Win	2–0	Mar 2024	Dubai Tennis Championships, UAE	ATP 500	Hard	(Germany) Jan-Lennard Struff	(Croatia) Ivan Dodig (United States) Austin Krajicek	6–4, 4–6, [10–6]
Loss	2–1	Jan 2025	Open Occitanie, France	ATP 250	Hard (i)	(Netherlands) Bart Stevens	(Netherlands) Robin Haase (Netherlands) Botic van de Zandschulp	7–6^{(9–7)}, 3–6, [5–10]

== ATP Challenger and ITF Tour finals ==
=== Singles: 26 (18 titles, 8 runner-ups) ===
Legend ATP Challenger Tour (11–2) ITF Futures (7–6)	Finals by surface Hard (9–4) Clay (9–4)

Result	W–L	Date	Tournament	Tier	Surface	Opponent	Score
Win	1–0	Jul 2018	Tampere Open, Finland	Challenger	Clay	(Argentina) Juan Ignacio Londero	6–3, 2–6, 6–3
Loss	1–1	Jul 2019	Tampere Open, Finland	Challenger	Clay	(Sweden) Mikael Ymer	3–6, 7–5, 3–6
Win	2–1	Sep 2019	Banja Luka Challenger, Bosnia and Herzegovina	Challenger	Clay	(India) Sumit Nagal	6–2, 6–3
Loss	2–2	Aug 2020	Prague Open, Czech Republic	Challenger	Clay	(Russia) Aslan Karatsev	4–6, 6–7^{(6–8)}
Win	3–2	May 2021	Prague Open, Czech Republic	Challenger	Clay	(Germany) Oscar Otte	5–7, 6–4, 6–4
Win	4–2	June 2021	Slovak Open, Slovakia	Challenger	Clay	(Argentina) Sebastián Báez	7–6^{(8–6)}, 6–3
Win	5–2	Jul 2021	Dutch Open, Netherlands	Challenger	Clay	(Netherlands) Botic van de Zandschulp	6–1, 3–6, 6–1
Win	6–2	Oct 2021	Murcia Open, Spain	Challenger	Clay	(Spain) Roberto Carballés Baena	3–6, 7–5, 6–3
Win	7–2	Oct 2021	Napoli Cup, Italy	Challenger	Clay	(Italy) Andrea Pellegrino	6–3, 6–2
Win	8–2	Oct 2021	Vesuvio Cup, Italy	Challenger	Clay	(United States) Alexander Ritschard	6–3, 6–2
Win	9–2	Nov 2021	Tenerife Challenger, Spain	Challenger	Hard	(Spain) Feliciano López	6–4, 6–4
Win	10–2	Nov 2021	Slovak Open II, Slovakia	Challenger	Hard (i)	(Hungary) Zsombor Piros	6–3, 6–2
Win	11–2	Jul 2022	Dutch Open, Netherlands (2)	Challenger	Clay	(Spain) Roberto Carballés Baena	6–1, 6–2
Loss	0–1	Aug 2015	F1 Vierumäki, Finland	Futures	Clay	(Russia) Aleksandr Vasilenko	6–7^{(9–11)}, 6–7^{(4–7)}
Loss	0–2	Oct 2015	F26 Port El Kantaoui, Tunisia	Futures	Hard	(Spain) Roberto Ortega Olmedo	1–6, 2–6
Loss	0–3	Aug 2016	F2 Hyvinkää, Finland	Futures	Clay	(Russia) Ivan Nedelko	1–6, 6–4, 6–7^{(6–8)}
Win	1–3	Aug 2016	F10 Koksijde, Belgium	Futures	Clay	(France) Thomas Bréchemier	7–5, 7–6^{(7–4)}
Loss	1–4	Oct 2016	F42 Antalya, Turkey	Futures	Hard	(Ukraine) Artem Smirnov	7–5, 4–6, 2–6
Win	2–4	Oct 2016	F43 Antalya, Turkey	Futures	Hard	(Bulgaria) Dimitar Kuzmanov	6–4, 6–4
Loss	2–5	Jan 2017	F2 Antalya, Turkey	Futures	Hard	(Bulgaria) Aleksandar Lazov	4–6, 6–2, 6–7^{(5–7)}
Loss	2–6	Jan 2017	F3 Antalya, Turkey	Futures	Hard	(Turkey) Cem İlkel	4–6, 0–1 ret.
Win	3–6	Mar 2017	F1 Manama, Bahrain	Futures	Hard	(Czech Republic) Michal Konečný	6–4, 6–4
Win	4–6	Sep 2017	F3 Jönköping, Sweden	Futures	Hard (i)	(Belarus) Dzmitry Zhyrmont	7–6^{(7–5)}, 6–4
Win	5–6	Oct 2017	F4 Falun, Sweden	Futures	Hard (i)	(Estonia) Jürgen Zopp	6–4, 6–1
Win	6–6	Oct 2017	F6 Heraklion, Greece	Futures	Hard	(Italy) Matteo Viola	7–6^{(7–4)}, 6–4
Win	7–6	Nov 2017	F8 Heraklion, Greece	Futures	Hard	(Spain) Carlos Gómez-Herrera	6–4, 6–2

=== Doubles: 16 (7 titles, 9 runner-ups) ===
Legend ATP Challenger Tour (0–2) ITF Futures (7–7)	Finals by surface Hard (2–5) Clay (5–4)

Result	W–L	Date	Tournament	Tier	Surface	Partner	Opponents	Score
Loss	0–1	Jul 2016	The Hague Open, Netherlands	Challenger	Clay	(Netherlands) Tim van Rijthoven	(Netherlands) Wesley Koolhof (Netherlands) Matwé Middelkoop	1–6, 6–3, [11–13]
Loss	0–2	May 2019	Prosperita Open, Czech Republic	Challenger	Clay	(Netherlands) Thiemo de Bakker	(Switzerland) Luca Margaroli (Slovakia) Filip Polášek	4–6, 6–2, [8–10]
Win	1–0	Aug 2014	F13 De Panne, Belgium	Futures	Clay	(Netherlands) Scott Griekspoor	(Belgium) James Junior Storme (Belgium) Michael Geerts	6–1, 6–2
Win	2–0	Aug 2015	F1 Vierumäki, Finland	Futures	Clay	(Netherlands) Bobbie De Goeijen	(Finland) Herkko Pöllänen (Denmark) Mikael Torpegaard	6–4, 7–6^{(7–2)}
Loss	2–1	Oct 2015	F1 Oslo, Norway	Futures	Hard (i)	(Netherlands) Scott Griekspoor	(Croatia) Ivan Sabanov (Croatia) Matej Sabanov	3–6, 4–6
Win	3–1	Jan 2016	F3 Antalya, Turkey	Futures	Hard	(Netherlands) Tim van Rijthoven	(Slovakia) Martin Blaško (Netherlands) Paul Monteban	6–3, 6–1
Loss	3–2	Mar 2016	F6 Poitiers, France	Futures	Hard (i)	(Netherlands) Scott Griekspoor	(Belgium) Maxime Authom (France) Jonathan Eysseric	6–4, 4–6, [9–11]
Loss	3–3	Apr 2016	F1 Manama, Bahrain	Futures	Hard	(Netherlands) Scott Griekspoor	(United States) Cameron Silverman (United States) Quinton Vega	0–6, 3–6
Loss	3–4	May 2016	F5 Bol, Croatia	Futures	Clay	(Germany) Tobias Simon	(Australia) Omar Jasika (Australia) Bradley Mousley	5–7, 6–7^{(5–7)}
Win	4–4	Jun 2016	F1 Alkmaar, Netherlands	Futures	Clay	(Netherlands) Tim van Rijthoven	(Philippines) Ruben Gonzales (United States) Connor Smith	7–6^{(7–3)}, 6–7^{(3–7)}, [10–8]
Win	5–4	Jul 2016	F3 Middelburg, Netherlands	Futures	Clay	(Netherlands) Tim van Rijthoven	(Netherlands) Bobbie De Goeijen (France) Yanais Laurent	6–2, 6–4
Loss	5–5	Jan 2017	F2 Antalya, Turkey	Futures	Hard	(Netherlands) Sidney de Boer	(Serbia) Petar Čonkić (Serbia) Goran Marković	6–2, 6–7^{(6–8)}, [3–10]
Win	6–5	Mar 2017	F1 Heraklion, Greece	Futures	Hard	(Netherlands) Kevin Griekspoor	(United Kingdom) Richard Gabb (United Kingdom) Luke Johnson	6–3, 6–4
Win	7–5	Aug 2017	F31 Antalya, Turkey	Futures	Clay	(Netherlands) Sidney de Boer	(Tunisia) Anis Ghorbel (Slovakia) Filip Horanský	6–4, 7–6^{(7–3)}
Loss	7–6	Sep 2017	F3 Jönköping, Sweden	Futures	Hard (i)	(Netherlands) Kevin Griekspoor	(Sweden) Markus Eriksson (Sweden) Milos Sekulic	0–6, 2–6
Loss	7–7	Mar 2018	F5 Santa Margherita di Pula, Italy	Futures	Clay	(Belgium) Maxime Authom	(Switzerland) Adrian Bodmer (Netherlands) Mark Vervoort	6–7^{(3–7)}, 6–4, [10–12]

== Wins over top 10 players ==
- Griekspoor has a 8–33 record against players who were, at the time the match was played, ranked in the top 10.

Season	2015–2020	2021	2022	2023	2024	2025	2026	Total
Wins	0	0	0	1	2	3	2	8

#	Player	Rk	Event	Surface	Rd	Score	Rk	Ref
2023
1.	(United States) Taylor Fritz	9	Washington Open, United States	Hard	SF	3–6, 6–3, 6–2	37	
2024
2.	(Poland) Hubert Hurkacz	8	Rotterdam Open, Netherlands	Hard (i)	2R	6–7^{(5–7)}, 7–6^{(7–5)}, 7–6^{(7–4)}	29	
3.	(Norway) Casper Ruud	8	Stockholm Open, Sweden	Hard (i)	QF	7–5, 7–6^{(7–5)}	37	
2025
4.	Daniil Medvedev	6	Dubai Tennis Championships, UAE	Hard	QF	2–6, 7–6^{(9–7)}, 7–5	47	
5.	(Germany) Alexander Zverev	2	Indian Wells Open, United States	Hard	2R	4–6, 7–6^{(7–5)}, 7–6^{(7–4)}	43	
6.	(Italy) Jannik Sinner	2	Shanghai Masters, China	Hard	3R	6–7^{(3–7)}, 7–5, 3–2 ret.	31	
2026
7.	(Kazakhstan) Alexander Bublik	10	Dubai Tennis Championships, UAE	Hard	2R	6–3, 7–6^{(7–4)}	25	
8.	(Germany) Alexander Zverev	3	Canadian Open, Canada	Hard	2R	6–7^{(3–7)}, 6–2, 6–4	69	
