= 2026 Rafa Nadal Open – Doubles =

Doubles
- 2026 Rafa Nadal Open

Final
- Champions: (Spain) Alberto Barroso Campos (Spain) David Vega Hernández
- Runners-up: (Denmark) Johannes Ingildsen (Denmark) Oskar Brostrøm Poulsen
- Score: 7–5, 7–6^{(7–5)}

Events
Singles	Doubles
- Rafa Nadal Open

Alberto Barroso Campos and Adrià Soriano Barrera were the defending champions but only Barroso Campos chose to defend his title, partnering David Vega Hernández. He successfully defended his title after defeating Johannes Ingildsen and Oskar Brostrøm Poulsen 7–5, 7–6^{(7–5)} in the final.

== Seeds ==
1. (Denmark) Johannes Ingildsen / (Denmark) Oskar Brostrøm Poulsen (final)
2. (Australia) Thomas Fancutt / (Japan) Seita Watanabe (semifinals)
3. (Spain) Alberto Barroso Campos / (Spain) David Vega Hernández (champions)
4. (Republic of Ireland) Charles Barry / (Germany) Daniel Masur (first round)

== Draw ==
Key

- Q = Qualifier
- WC = Wild card
- LL = Lucky loser
- Alt = Alternate
- ITF = ITF entry
- PR = Protected ranking
- SR = Special ranking
- SE = Special exempt
- JE = Junior exempt
- JR = Junior Accelerator Programme entrant
- CO = College Accelerator Programme entrant
- NG = Next Gen Accelerator Program entrant
- w/o = Walkover
- r = Retired
- d = Defaulted

First round
1	(Denmark) J Ingildsen (Denmark) OB Poulsen	6^{6}	6	[10]
(Mexico) A Hernández (Spain) Iván Marrero Curbelo	7^{8}	3	[8]
(Denmark) A Holmgren (Denmark) CE Overbeck	6^{5}	6	[7]
(Japan) J Friend (Spain) I Montes de la Torre	7^{7}	3	[10]
4	(Republic of Ireland) C Barry (Germany) D Masur	3	6	[7]
PR	(Zimbabwe) B Lock (Zimbabwe) CJ Lock	6	3	[10]
WC	(Bulgaria) I Ivanov (Armenia) Daniil Sarksian	3	6	[3]
(Switzerland) R Bertola (Switzerland) J Kym	6	3	[10]
(United States) Zachary Fuchs (Venezuela) B Pérez	7^{7}	6
(Norway) N Budkov Kjær (Norway) V Durasovic	6^{1}	4
WC	(Japan) Motoharu Abe (Pakistan) Nadir Mirza	4	5
3	(Spain) A Barroso Campos (Spain) D Vega Hernández	6	7
(India) A Kalyanpur (India) J Nedunchezhiyan	3	4
(Lithuania) E Butvilas (Poland) M Kaśnikowski	6	6
(France) F Balshaw (Sweden) Oliver Johansson	5	2
2	(Australia) T Fancutt (Japan) S Watanabe	7	6

Quarterfinals
1	(Denmark) J Ingildsen (Denmark) OB Poulsen	w/o
(Japan) J Friend (Spain) I Montes de la Torre
PR	(Zimbabwe) B Lock (Zimbabwe) CJ Lock	2	2
(Switzerland) R Bertola (Switzerland) J Kym	6	6
(United States) Z Fuchs (Venezuela) B Pérez	7^{8}	4	[10]
3	(Spain) A Barroso Campos (Spain) D Vega Hernández	6^{6}	6	[12]
(Lithuania) E Butvilas (Poland) M Kaśnikowski	4	6	[12]
2	(Australia) T Fancutt (Japan) S Watanabe	6	3	[14]

Semifinals
1	(Denmark) J Ingildsen (Denmark) OB Poulsen	6	6^{4}	[10]
(Switzerland) R Bertola (Switzerland) J Kym	4	7^{7}	[7]
3	(Spain) A Barroso Campos (Spain) D Vega Hernández	6	6
2	(Australia) T Fancutt (Japan) S Watanabe	4	2

Final
1	(Denmark) J Ingildsen (Denmark) OB Poulsen	5	6^{5}
3	(Spain) A Barroso Campos (Spain) D Vega Hernández	7	7^{7}
