= 2024 Rafa Nadal Open =

- Date: 26 August – 1 September
- Edition: 6th
- Surface: Hard
- Location: Manacor, Spain

Champions

Singles
- (Croatia) Duje Ajduković

Doubles
- (Austria) David Pichler / (Austria) Jurij Rodionov
- Rafa Nadal Open

The 2024 Rafa Nadal Open was a professional tennis tournament played on hard courts. It was the sixth edition of the tournament which was part of the 2024 ATP Challenger Tour. It took place in Manacor, Spain between 26 August and 1 September 2024.

== Singles main-draw entrants ==
=== Seeds ===
Country	Player	Rank^{1}	Seed
BIH	Damir Džumhur	81	1
GER	Yannick Hanfmann	98	2
~~FRA~~	~~Harold Mayot~~	~~112~~	~~3~~
FRA	Pierre-Hugues Herbert	133	4
CRO	Duje Ajduković	135	5
BRA	Felipe Meligeni Alves	139	6
ARG	Marco Trungelliti	141	7
DEN	August Holmgren	163	8
SUI	Marc-Andrea Hüsler	164	9

- ^{1} Rankings are as of 19 August 2024.

=== Other entrants ===
The following players received wildcards into the singles main draw:

- (Croatia) Marin Čilić
- (Japan) Naoya Honda
- (Spain) Martín Landaluce

The following players received entry into the singles main draw as alternates:

- (France) Robin Bertrand
- (Czech Republic) Jiří Veselý

The following players received entry from the qualifying draw:

- (Lithuania) Ričardas Berankis
- (France) Laurent Lokoli
- (France) Jules Marie
- (Spain) Iñaki Montes de la Torre
- (Syria) Hazem Naw
- (Uzbekistan) Khumoyun Sultanov

The following player received entry as a lucky loser:

- (Spain) Alberto Barroso Campos

== Champions ==
=== Singles ===
- (Croatia) Duje Ajduković def. (Italy) Matteo Gigante 4–6, 6–3, 6–4.

=== Doubles ===
- (Austria) David Pichler / (Austria) Jurij Rodionov def. (India) Anirudh Chandrasekar / (Spain) David Vega Hernández 1–6, 6–3, [10–7].
