= 2025 Rafa Nadal Open – Doubles =

Doubles
- 2025 Rafa Nadal Open

Final
- Champions: (Spain) Alberto Barroso Campos (Colombia) Adrià Soriano Barrera
- Runners-up: (Austria) David Pichler (Austria) Jurij Rodionov
- Score: 7–6^{(7–2)}, 3–6, [10–2]

Events
Singles	Doubles
- Rafa Nadal Open

David Pichler and Jurij Rodionov were the defending champions but lost in the final to Alberto Barroso Campos and Adrià Soriano Barrera.

Barroso Campos and Soriano Barrera won the title after defeating Pichler and Rodionov 7–6^{(7–2)}, 3–6, [10–2] in the final.

== Seeds ==
1. (Bolivia) Boris Arias / (Bolivia) Federico Zeballos (first round)
2. (France) Arthur Reymond / (France) Luca Sanchez (quarterfinals)
3. (Slovakia) Miloš Karol / (Finland) Patrik Niklas-Salminen (first round)
4. (Lebanon) Benjamin Hassan / (Germany) Andreas Mies (semifinals)

== Draw ==
Key

- Q = Qualifier
- WC = Wild card
- LL = Lucky loser
- Alt = Alternate
- ITF = ITF entry
- PR = Protected ranking
- SR = Special ranking
- SE = Special exempt
- JE = Junior exempt
- JR = Junior Accelerator Programme entrant
- CO = College Accelerator Programme entrant
- NG = Next Gen Accelerator Program entrant
- w/o = Walkover
- r = Retired
- d = Defaulted

=== Draw ===
First round
1	(Bolivia) B Arias (Bolivia) F Zeballos	6	5	[6]
Alt	(Spain) A Barroso Campos (Colombia) A Soriano Barrera	2	7	[10]
WC	(Lithuania) E Butvilas (Jordan) A Shelbayh	7	6^{4}	[6]
(Philippines) FC Alcantara (Netherlands) T Loof	5	7^{7}	[10]
4	(Lebanon) B Hassan (Germany) A Mies	7^{7}	6
(United Kingdom) S Parker (Switzerland) J Paul	6^{3}	4
WC	(China) Qi Hongjin (Spain) D Rincón	3	6	[9]
Alt	(Venezuela) Juan José Bianchi (Georgia (country)) S Purtseladze	6	3	[11]
(Finland) Patrik Kaukovalta (Finland) O Virtanen	2	6^{5}
(Austria) D Pichler (Austria) J Rodionov	6	7^{7}
(Czech Republic) M Gengel (Czech Republic) D Poljak	6	6
3	(Slovakia) M Karol (Finland) P Niklas-Salminen	1	4
(France) M Martineau (France) H Mayot	3	7	[10]
(France) C Chidekh (Antigua and Barbuda) J Maginley	6	5	[3]
(Belgium) M Geerts (Spain) S Martos Gornés	6^{3}	4
2	(France) A Reymond (France) L Sanchez	7^{7}	6

Quarterfinals
Alt	(Spain) A Barroso Campos (Colombia) A Soriano Barrera	4	7	[10]
(Philippines) FC Alcantara (Netherlands) T Loof	6	5	[8]
4	(Lebanon) B Hassan (Germany) A Mies	3	6	[10]
Alt	(Venezuela) JJ Bianchi (Georgia (country)) S Purtseladze	6	2	[4]
(Austria) D Pichler (Austria) J Rodionov	6	7^{7}
(Czech Republic) M Gengel (Czech Republic) D Poljak	2	6^{2}
(France) M Martineau (France) H Mayot	6	6
2	(France) A Reymond (France) L Sanchez	4	4

Semifinals
Alt	(Spain) A Barroso Campos (Colombia) A Soriano Barrera	7^{7}	7
4	(Lebanon) B Hassan (Germany) A Mies	6^{5}	5
(Austria) D Pichler (Austria) J Rodionov	6	6
(France) M Martineau (France) H Mayot	1	4

Final
Alt	(Spain) A Barroso Campos (Colombia) A Soriano Barrera	7^{7}	3	[10]
(Austria) D Pichler (Austria) J Rodionov	6^{2}	6	[2]
