= 2024 Rafa Nadal Open – Singles =

Singles
- 2024 Rafa Nadal Open

Final
- Champion: (Croatia) Duje Ajduković
- Runner-up: (Italy) Matteo Gigante
- Score: 4–6, 6–3, 6–4

Events
Singles	Doubles
- Rafa Nadal Open

Hamad Medjedovic was the defending champion but chose not to defend his title.

Duje Ajduković won the title after defeating Matteo Gigante 4–6, 6–3, 6–4 in the final.

== Seeds ==
1. (Bosnia and Herzegovina) Damir Džumhur (first round, retired)
2. (Germany) Yannick Hanfmann (second round)
3. (France) Harold Mayot (withdrew)
4. (France) Pierre-Hugues Herbert (second round)
5. (Croatia) Duje Ajduković (champion)
6. (Brazil) Felipe Meligeni Alves (first round)
7. (Argentina) Marco Trungelliti (second round)
8. (Denmark) August Holmgren (first round)
9. (Switzerland) Marc-Andrea Hüsler (quarterfinals)

== Draw ==
Key

- Q = Qualifier
- WC = Wild card
- LL = Lucky loser
- Alt = Alternate
- ITF = ITF entry
- PR = Protected ranking
- SR = Special ranking
- SE = Special exempt
- JE = Junior exempt
- JR = Junior Accelerator Programme entrant
- CO = College Accelerator Programme entrant
- NG = Next Gen Accelerator Program entrant
- w/o = Walkover
- r = Retired
- d = Defaulted

=== Finals ===
Semifinals
Q	(Uzbekistan) Khumoyun Sultanov	4	3
5	(Croatia) Duje Ajduković	6	6
(Italy) Matteo Gigante	1	6	7
(Switzerland) Jérôme Kym	6	3	5

Final
5	(Croatia) Duje Ajduković	4	6	6
(Italy) Matteo Gigante	6	3	4

=== Top half ===
First round
1	(Bosnia and Herzegovina) D Džumhur	3	1^{r}
Q	(Spain) I Montes de la Torre	6	4
WC	(Japan) Naoya Honda	6^{1}	6	3
(Jordan) A Shelbayh	7^{7}	4	6
Alt	(France) R Bertrand	2	7^{7}	4
Q	(Uzbekistan) K Sultanov	6	6^{4}	6
(Belgium) R Collignon	7^{7}	6
6	(Brazil) F Meligeni Alves	6^{4}	4
9	(Switzerland) M-A Hüsler	6	6
(Tunisia) A Dougaz	4	4
Q	(France) L Lokoli	1	3
(Belgium) A Blockx	6	6
LL	(Spain) A Barroso Campos	4	4
WC	(Croatia) M Čilić	6	6
WC	(Spain) M Landaluce	5	1
5	(Croatia) D Ajduković	7	6

Second round
Q	(Spain) I Montes de la Torre	6^{4}	4
(Jordan) A Shelbayh	7^{7}	6
Q	(Uzbekistan) K Sultanov	6	6
(Belgium) R Collignon	3	4
9	(Switzerland) M-A Hüsler	7^{7}	6
(Belgium) A Blockx	6^{1}	4
WC	(Croatia) M Čilić	6^{4}	6	3
5	(Croatia) D Ajduković	7^{7}	4	6

Quarterfinals
(Jordan) A Shelbayh	6	5	2
Q	(Uzbekistan) K Sultanov	2	7	6
9	(Switzerland) M-A Hüsler	3	6^{2}
5	(Croatia) D Ajduković	6	7^{7}

Semifinals
Q	(Uzbekistan) K Sultanov	4	3
5	(Croatia) D Ajduković	6	6

=== Bottom half ===
First round
8	(Denmark) A Holmgren	7^{7}	1	2
(United Kingdom) C Broom	6^{2}	6	6
(Italy) M Gigante	6	7^{7}
(Austria) J Rodionov	1	6^{3}
(France) E Couacaud	7^{7}	6
(Germany) R Molleker	6^{5}	0
(United Kingdom) L Broady	7^{7}	6^{5}	4
4	(France) P-H Herbert	6^{5}	7^{7}	6
7	(Argentina) M Trungelliti	6	6
Q	(France) Jules Marie	3	4
Q	(Lithuania) R Berankis	6	6
Q	(Syria) H Naw	4	4
(France) M Janvier	3	1^{r}
(Switzerland) J Kym	6	4
Alt	(Czech Republic) J Veselý	4	4
2	(Germany) Y Hanfmann	6	6

Second round
(United Kingdom) C Broom	3	7	3
(Italy) M Gigante	6	5	6
(France) E Couacaud	4	6	6
4	(France) P-H Herbert	6	4	2
7	(Argentina) M Trungelliti	4	6^{6}
Q	(Lithuania) R Berankis	6	7^{8}
(Switzerland) J Kym	6	7
2	(Germany) Y Hanfmann	4	5

Quarterfinals
(Italy) M Gigante	6	6
(France) E Couacaud	3	4
Q	(Lithuania) R Berankis	3	2
(Switzerland) J Kym	6	6

Semifinals
(Italy) M Gigante	1	6	7
(Switzerland) J Kym	6	3	5
