= 2022 Rafa Nadal Open – Doubles =

Doubles
- 2022 Rafa Nadal Open

Final
- Champions: (India) Yuki Bhambri (India) Saketh Myneni
- Runners-up: (Czech Republic) Marek Gengel (Czech Republic) Lukáš Rosol
- Score: 6–2, 6–2

Events
Singles	Doubles
- Rafa Nadal Open

Karol Drzewiecki and Sergio Martos Gornés were the defending champions but only Martos Gornés chose to defend his title, partnering Marco Bortolotti. Martos Gornés lost in the semifinals to Yuki Bhambri and Saketh Myneni.

Bhambri and Myneni won the title after defeating Marek Gengel and Lukáš Rosol 6–2, 6–2 in the final.

== Seeds ==
1. (Italy) Marco Bortolotti / (Spain) Sergio Martos Gornés (semifinals)
2. (Netherlands) David Pel / (Poland) Szymon Walków (semifinals)
3. (India) Yuki Bhambri / (India) Saketh Myneni (champions)
4. (Romania) Victor Vlad Cornea / (Netherlands) Bart Stevens (quarterfinals)

== Draw ==
Key

- Q = Qualifier
- WC = Wild card
- LL = Lucky loser
- Alt = Alternate
- ITF = ITF entry
- PR = Protected ranking
- SR = Special ranking
- SE = Special exempt
- JE = Junior exempt
- JR = Junior Accelerator Programme entrant
- CO = College Accelerator Programme entrant
- NG = Next Gen Accelerator Program entrant
- w/o = Walkover
- r = Retired
- d = Defaulted

First round
1	(Italy) M Bortolotti (Spain) S Martos Gornés	6	7^{7}
(Italy) F Maestrelli (Italy) L Nardi	4	6^{2}
(Spain) A Barroso Campos (Spain) A Menéndez Maceiras	2	6	[10]
(United Kingdom) B Jones (United Kingdom) Daniel Little	6	4	[5]
3	(India) Y Bhambri (India) S Myneni	6	6
Alt	(Estonia) D Glinka (Estonia) Karl Kiur Saar	4	2
(United Kingdom) L Johnson (Tunisia) S Mansouri	5	6	[6]
(Kazakhstan) D Popko (Japan) K Uchida	7	3	[10]
WC	(Montenegro) Milo Gazivoda (Jordan) A Shelbayh	3	3
(Czech Republic) M Gengel (Czech Republic) L Rosol	6	6
(Turkey) A Çelikbilek (Poland) K Żuk	6^{4}	7^{7}	[8]
4	(Romania) VV Cornea (Netherlands) B Stevens	7^{7}	6^{2}	[10]
(Bulgaria) A Donski (Bulgaria) A Lazarov	5	4
(United Kingdom) J Clarke (Germany) D Masur	7	6
(France) A Olivetti (Switzerland) L Riedi	6^{3}	6	[4]
2	(Netherlands) D Pel (Poland) S Walków	7^{7}	2	[10]

Quarterfinals
1	(Italy) M Bortolotti (Spain) S Martos Gornés	6	7^{9}
(Spain) A Barroso Campos (Spain) A Menéndez Maceiras	4	6^{7}
3	(India) Y Bhambri (India) S Myneni	6	6
(Kazakhstan) D Popko (Japan) K Uchida	3	2
(Czech Republic) M Gengel (Czech Republic) L Rosol	7	3	[11]
4	(Romania) VV Cornea (Netherlands) B Stevens	5	6	[9]
(United Kingdom) J Clarke (Germany) D Masur	3	6^{5}
2	(Netherlands) D Pel (Poland) S Walków	6	7^{7}

Semifinals
1	(Italy) M Bortolotti (Spain) S Martos Gornés	6	6^{5}	[5]
3	(India) Y Bhambri (India) S Myneni	2	7^{7}	[10]
(Czech Republic) M Gengel (Czech Republic) L Rosol	5	6	[10]
2	(Netherlands) D Pel (Poland) S Walków	7	4	[8]

Final
3	(India) Y Bhambri (India) S Myneni	6	6
(Czech Republic) M Gengel (Czech Republic) L Rosol	2	2
