= 2018 Rafa Nadal Open Banc Sabadell – Doubles =

Doubles
- 2018 Rafa Nadal Open Banc Sabadell

Final
- Champions: (Uruguay) Ariel Behar (Spain) Enrique López Pérez
- Runners-up: (United Kingdom) Dan Evans (Spain) Gerard Granollers
- Score: Walkover

Events
Singles	Doubles
- Rafa Nadal Open Banc Sabadell

This was the first edition of the tournament.

Ariel Behar and Enrique López Pérez won the title after Dan Evans and Gerard Granollers withdrew before the final.

== Seeds ==
1. (Russia) Mikhail Elgin / (Belarus) Andrei Vasilevski (first round)
2. (Uruguay) Ariel Behar / (Spain) Enrique López Pérez (champions)
3. (Switzerland) Luca Margaroli / (Spain) David Vega Hernández (semifinals)
4. (Venezuela) Luis David Martínez / (Portugal) Gonçalo Oliveira (first round)

== Draw ==
Key

- Q = Qualifier
- WC = Wild card
- LL = Lucky loser
- Alt = Alternate
- ITF = ITF entry
- PR = Protected ranking
- SR = Special ranking
- SE = Special exempt
- JE = Junior exempt
- JR = Junior Accelerator Programme entrant
- CO = College Accelerator Programme entrant
- NG = Next Gen Accelerator Program entrant
- w/o = Walkover
- r = Retired
- d = Defaulted

First round
1	(Russia) M Elgin (Belarus) A Vasilevski	4	4
(United Kingdom) D Evans (Spain) G Granollers	6	6
(Serbia) N Čačić (Austria) L Miedler	4	6	[5]
(Poland) T Bednarek (Poland) S Walków	6	3	[10]
3	(Switzerland) L Margaroli (Spain) D Vega Hernández	6	6
(Turkey) T Altuna (India) R Ramanathan	3	2
WC	(Spain) Pablo Schelcher Muro (Spain) P Vives Marcos	3	7^{7}	[3]
(Poland) G Panfil (Ukraine) V Uzhylovskyi	6	6^{5}	[10]
(Sweden) A Göransson (Bolivia) F Zeballos	2	7	[5]
(Italy) T Fabbiano (Italy) L Vanni	6	5	[10]
(Australia) M Reid (Ukraine) S Stakhovsky	6	7^{7}
4	(Venezuela) LD Martínez (Portugal) G Oliveira	3	6^{3}
WC	(United Kingdom) Jake Hersey (India) A Kalyanpur	2	4
(Spain) S Gutiérrez Ferrol (Spain) S Martos Gornés	6	6
WC	(Spain) A Artuñedo (Spain) D Pérez Sanz	3	3
2	(Uruguay) A Behar (Spain) E López Pérez	6	6

Quarterfinals
(United Kingdom) D Evans (Spain) G Granollers	6	4	[10]
(Poland) T Bednarek (Poland) S Walków	4	6	[8]
3	(Switzerland) L Margaroli (Spain) D Vega Hernández	4	6	[10]
(Poland) G Panfil (Ukraine) V Uzhylovskyi	6	4	[3]
(Italy) T Fabbiano (Italy) L Vanni	4	6	[10]
(Australia) M Reid (Ukraine) S Stakhovsky	6	4	[8]
(Spain) S Gutiérrez Ferrol (Spain) S Martos Gornés	3	4
2	(Uruguay) A Behar (Spain) E López Pérez	6	6

Semifinals
(United Kingdom) D Evans (Spain) G Granollers	4	6	[10]
3	(Switzerland) L Margaroli (Spain) D Vega Hernández	6	1	[5]
(Italy) T Fabbiano (Italy) L Vanni	3	3
2	(Uruguay) A Behar (Spain) E López Pérez	6	6

Final
(United Kingdom) D Evans (Spain) G Granollers
2	(Uruguay) A Behar (Spain) E López Pérez	w/o
