= 2025 Rafa Nadal Open – Singles =

Singles
- 2025 Rafa Nadal Open

Final
- Champion: (Spain) Daniel Rincón
- Runner-up: (Austria) Jurij Rodionov
- Score: 7–6^{(7–3)}, 6–2

Events
| Singles | Doubles |
- Rafa Nadal Open

Duje Ajduković was the defending champion but chose not to defend his title.

Daniel Rincón won the title after defeating Jurij Rodionov 7–6^{(7–3)}, 6–2 in the final.

== Seeds ==
1. (Finland) Otto Virtanen (first round)
2. (Spain) Martín Landaluce (first round)
3. (France) Harold Mayot (semifinals, retired)
4. (Austria) Jurij Rodionov (final)
5. (France) Calvin Hemery (first round, retired)
6. (Lebanon) Benjamin Hassan (first round)
7. (France) Sascha Gueymard Wayenburg (second round)
8. (Croatia) Borna Gojo (withdrew)

== Draw ==
Key

- Q = Qualifier
- WC = Wild card
- LL = Lucky loser
- Alt = Alternate
- ITF = ITF entry
- PR = Protected ranking
- SR = Special ranking
- SE = Special exempt
- JE = Junior exempt
- JR = Junior Accelerator Programme entrant
- CO = College Accelerator Programme entrant
- NG = Next Gen Accelerator Program entrant
- w/o = Walkover
- r = Retired
- d = Defaulted

=== Finals ===
Semifinals
Alt | (Spain) Daniel Rincón | 6^{2} | 7 | 4
3 | (France) Harold Mayot | 7^{7} | 5 | 1^{r}
4 | (Austria) Jurij Rodionov | 5 | 6 | 6
(Lithuania) Edas Butvilas | 7 | 2 | 1

Final
Alt | (Spain) Daniel Rincón | 7^{7} | 6
4 | (Austria) Jurij Rodionov | 6^{3} | 2

=== Top half ===
First round
1 | (Finland) O Virtanen | 3 | 3
Q | (United Kingdom) H Stewart | 6 | 6
WC | (Jordan) A Shelbayh | 4 | 6 | 6^{1}
Alt | (Spain) D Rincón | 6 | 3 | 7^{7}
Alt | (Ivory Coast) E Coulibaly | 2 | 7^{7} | 6
(Czech Republic) M Gengel | 6 | 6^{4} | 0
JR | (Colombia) Miguel Tobón | 6 | 4
5 | (France) C Hemery | 3 | 1^{r}
3 | (France) H Mayot | 6 | 7
(United Kingdom) G Loffhagen | 3 | 5
(Switzerland) M-A Hüsler | 6^{3} | 7^{8} | 2^{r}
LL | (Colombia) A Soriano Barrera | 7^{7} | 6^{6} | 3
Q | (United Kingdom) S Parker | 6^{3} | 6 | 6
WC | (Spain) John Echeverría | 7^{7} | 0 | 0
Q | (Switzerland) J Paul | 6 | 7^{7}
6 | (Lebanon) B Hassan | 3 | 6^{5}

Second round
Q | (United Kingdom) H Stewart | 6 | 3 | 5
Alt | (Spain) D Rincón | 2 | 6 | 7
Alt | (Ivory Coast) E Coulibaly | 6^{2} | 6^{4}
JR | (Colombia) M Tobón | 7^{7} | 7^{7}
3 | (France) H Mayot | 6 | 6
LL | (Colombia) A Soriano Barrera | 4 | 4
Q | (United Kingdom) S Parker | 6 | 6
Q | (Switzerland) J Paul | 3 | 2

Quarterfinals
Alt | (Spain) D Rincón | 3 | 6 | 6
JR | (Colombia) M Tobón | 6 | 1 | 0
3 | (France) H Mayot | 7 | 6^{8} | 3
Q | (United Kingdom) S Parker | 5 | 7^{10} | 0^{r}

Semifinals
Alt | (Spain) D Rincón | 6^{2} | 7 | 4
3 | (France) H Mayot | 7^{7} | 5 | 1^{r}

=== Bottom half ===
First round
Q | (Germany) D Masur | 6 | 6
(Georgia (country)) S Purtseladze | 4 | 4
(Slovakia) N Gombos | 5 | 6 | 2
Q | (Spain) A Barroso Campos | 7 | 4 | 6
(Germany) J Engel | 7^{8} | 7
WC | (Bulgaria) I Ivanov | 6^{6} | 5
Alt | (France) M Martineau | 4 | 6 | 2
4 | (Austria) J Rodionov | 6 | 4 | 6
7 | (France) S Gueymard Wayenburg | 6 | 6
(United Kingdom) R Peniston | 4 | 3
(Lithuania) E Butvilas | 6 | 6
Q | (Belgium) M Geerts | 3 | 2
(Italy) F Cinà | 0 | 0
CO | (Japan) JD Friend | 6 | 6
(Monaco) V Vacherot | 6 | 7^{7}
2 | (Spain) M Landaluce | 1 | 6^{5}

Second round
Q | (Germany) D Masur | 7 | 6
Q | (Spain) A Barroso Campos | 5 | 2
(Germany) J Engel | 4 | 5
4 | (Austria) J Rodionov | 6 | 7
7 | (France) S Gueymard Wayenburg | 6^{2} | 6^{5}
(Lithuania) E Butvilas | 7^{7} | 7^{7}
CO | (Japan) JD Friend | 6^{4} | 6 | 6
(Monaco) V Vacherot | 7^{7} | 3 | 4

Quarterfinals
Q | (Germany) D Masur | 7^{7} | 6^{2} | 6^{6}
4 | (Austria) J Rodionov | 6^{1} | 7^{7} | 7^{8}
(Lithuania) E Butvilas | 6 | 6
CO | (Japan) JD Friend | 2 | 4

Semifinals
4 | (Austria) J Rodionov | 5 | 6 | 6
(Lithuania) E Butvilas | 7 | 2 | 1
