= 2019 Rafa Nadal Open Banc Sabadell – Doubles =

Doubles
- 2019 Rafa Nadal Open Banc Sabadell

Final
- Champions: (Netherlands) Sander Arends (Netherlands) David Pel
- Runners-up: (Poland) Karol Drzewiecki (Poland) Szymon Walków
- Score: 7–5, 6–4

Events
Singles	Doubles
- Rafa Nadal Open Banc Sabadell

Ariel Behar and Enrique López Pérez were the defending champions but only López Pérez chose to defend his title, partnering Alejandro Davidovich Fokina. Davidovich Fokina and López Pérez retired in their first round match against Karol Drzewiecki and Szymon Walków.

Sander Arends and David Pel won the title after defeating Drzewiecki and Walków 7–5, 6–4 in the final.

== Seeds ==
1. (Netherlands) Sander Arends / (Netherlands) David Pel (champions)
2. (Ukraine) Sergiy Stakhovsky / (Belarus) Andrei Vasilevski (quarterfinals)
3. (Poland) Karol Drzewiecki / (Poland) Szymon Walków (final)
4. (Venezuela) Luis David Martínez / (Brazil) Felipe Meligeni Alves (semifinals)

== Draw ==
Key

- Q = Qualifier
- WC = Wild card
- LL = Lucky loser
- Alt = Alternate
- ITF = ITF entry
- PR = Protected ranking
- SR = Special ranking
- SE = Special exempt
- JE = Junior exempt
- JR = Junior Accelerator Programme entrant
- CO = College Accelerator Programme entrant
- NG = Next Gen Accelerator Program entrant
- w/o = Walkover
- r = Retired
- d = Defaulted

First round
1	(Netherlands) S Arends (Netherlands) D Pel	w/o
(Germany) P Gojowczyk (Germany) D Masur
WC	(Spain) S Martos Gornés (Spain) P Vives Marcos	6^{4}	7^{7}	[5]
(United Kingdom) S Clayton (United Kingdom) L Glasspool	7^{7}	6^{5}	[10]
4	(Venezuela) LD Martínez (Brazil) F Meligeni Alves	6	6
(Spain) A Menéndez Maceiras (Israel) D Sela	3	4
(Finland) H Heliövaara (Finland) E Ruusuvuori	6	6
WC	(Turkey) A Çelikbilek (Turkey) C İlkel	4	3
WC	(Israel) Aaron Cohen (France) Imran Sibille	w/o
(Austria) L Miedler (Serbia) D Petrović
(Spain) A Davidovich Fokina (Spain) E López Pérez	6	0^{r}
3	(Poland) K Drzewiecki (Poland) S Walków	4	1
(France) Q Halys (France) G Sakharov	4	3
(Belarus) U Ignatik (Russia) R Safiullin	6	6
PR	(Spain) Í Cervantes (Spain) G Granollers	3	4
2	(Ukraine) S Stakhovsky (Belarus) A Vasilevski	6	6

Quarterfinals
1	(Netherlands) S Arends (Netherlands) D Pel	6	6
(United Kingdom) S Clayton (United Kingdom) L Glasspool	2	4
4	(Venezuela) LD Martínez (Brazil) F Meligeni Alves	6	3	[10]
(Finland) H Heliövaara (Finland) E Ruusuvuori	3	6	[5]
WC	(Israel) A Cohen (France) I Sibille	0	2
3	(Poland) K Drzewiecki (Poland) S Walków	6	6
(Belarus) U Ignatik (Russia) R Safiullin	7	6
2	(Ukraine) S Stakhovsky (Belarus) A Vasilevski	5	2

Semifinals
1	(Netherlands) S Arends (Netherlands) D Pel	6	7^{8}
4	(Venezuela) LD Martínez (Brazil) F Meligeni Alves	4	6^{6}
3	(Poland) K Drzewiecki (Poland) S Walków	3	6	[10]
(Belarus) U Ignatik (Russia) R Safiullin	6	3	[0]

Final
1	(Netherlands) S Arends (Netherlands) D Pel	7	6
3	(Poland) K Drzewiecki (Poland) S Walków	5	4
