= 2026 Rafa Nadal Open =

- Date: 1 – 6 September
- Edition: 8th
- Surface: Hard
- Location: Manacor, Spain

Champions

Singles
- (France) Felix Balshaw

Doubles
- (Spain) Alberto Barroso Campos / (Spain) David Vega Hernández
- Rafa Nadal Open

The 2026 Rafa Nadal Open was a professional tennis tournament played on hard courts. It was the eighth edition of the tournament which was part of the 2026 ATP Challenger Tour. It took place in Manacor, Spain between 1 and 6 September 2026.

== Singles main-draw entrants ==
=== Seeds ===
Country	Player	Rank^{1}	Seed
AUT	Sebastian Ofner	125	1
FRA	Alexandre Müller	138	2
NOR	Nicolai Budkov Kjær	149	3
EST	Daniil Glinka	156	4
GBR	Billy Harris	161	5
GBR	Jack Pinnington Jones	165	6
DEN	Elmer Møller	170	7
AUT	Joel Schwärzler	171	8

- ^{1} Rankings are as of 24 August 2026.

=== Other entrants ===
The following players received wildcards into the singles main draw:

- (Bulgaria) Ivan Ivanov
- (Spain) Alejo Sánchez Quílez
- (Slovenia) Žiga Šeško

The following player received entry into the singles main draw using a protected ranking:

- (Brazil) Felipe Meligeni Alves

The following player received entry into the singles main draw through the College Accelerator programme:

- (Japan) Jay Friend

The following player received entry into the singles main draw as an alternate:

- (Spain) Iñaki Montes de la Torre

The following players received entry from the qualifying draw:

- (France) Mathys Erhard
- (France) Sascha Gueymard Wayenburg
- (Thailand) Maximus Jones
- (Estonia) Mark Lajal
- (Italy) Luca Potenza
- (Brazil) Matheus Pucinelli de Almeida

== Champions ==
=== Singles ===
- (France) Felix Balshaw def. (Spain) Iñaki Montes de la Torre 3–6, 6–2, 6–3.

=== Doubles ===
- (Spain) Alberto Barroso Campos / (Spain) David Vega Hernández def. (Denmark) Johannes Ingildsen / (Denmark) Oskar Brostrøm Poulsen 7–5, 7–6^{(7–5)}.
