= 2019 Rafa Nadal Open Banc Sabadell – Singles =

Singles
- 2019 Rafa Nadal Open Banc Sabadell

Final
- Champion: (Finland) Emil Ruusuvuori
- Runner-up: (Italy) Matteo Viola
- Score: 6–0, 6–1

Events
Singles	Doubles
- Rafa Nadal Open Banc Sabadell

Bernard Tomic was the defending champion but chose not to defend his title.

Former world No. 1 Andy Murray played at the tournament and he won his first singles match since hip surgery. In the third round, he lost to Matteo Viola.

Emil Ruusuvuori won the title after defeating Viola 6–0, 6–1 in the final.

== Seeds ==
All seeds receive a bye into the second round.

1. (Germany) Peter Gojowczyk (second round)
2. (Germany) Matthias Bachinger (second round)
3. (Slovakia) Norbert Gombos (second round)
4. (Germany) Yannick Maden (third round)
5. (Spain) Alejandro Davidovich Fokina (semifinals)
6. (Italy) Federico Gaio (second round)
7. (Ukraine) Sergiy Stakhovsky (third round)
8. (Czech Republic) Lukáš Rosol (second round)
9. (Spain) Pedro Martínez (quarterfinals)
10. (France) Quentin Halys (second round)
11. (Israel) Dudi Sela (second round)
12. (Spain) Adrián Menéndez Maceiras (third round, retired)
13. (Argentina) Carlos Berlocq (second round)
14. (Spain) Mario Vilella Martínez (second round, retired)
15. (Finland) Emil Ruusuvuori (champion)
16. (Spain) Enrique López Pérez (second round)

== Draw ==
Key

- Q = Qualifier
- WC = Wild card
- LL = Lucky loser
- Alt = Alternate
- ITF = ITF entry
- PR = Protected ranking
- SR = Special ranking
- SE = Special exempt
- JE = Junior exempt
- JR = Junior Accelerator Programme entrant
- CO = College Accelerator Programme entrant
- NG = Next Gen Accelerator Program entrant
- w/o = Walkover
- r = Retired
- d = Defaulted

=== Finals ===
Quarterfinals
(Austria) Jurij Rodionov	4	6	6^{3}
5	(Spain) Alejandro Davidovich Fokina	6	1	7^{7}
15	(Finland) Emil Ruusuvuori	6	6
9	(Spain) Pedro Martínez	3	1
(Slovenia) Blaž Kavčič	2	1
(Italy) Matteo Viola	6	6
Alt	(Ukraine) Illya Marchenko	6^{2}	2
(Germany) Daniel Masur	7^{7}	6

Semifinals
5	(Spain) Alejandro Davidovich Fokina	5	2
15	(Finland) Emil Ruusuvuori	7	6
(Italy) Matteo Viola	7^{7}	4	6
(Germany) Daniel Masur	6^{3}	6	2

Final
15	(Finland) Emil Ruusuvuori	6	6
(Italy) Matteo Viola	0	1

=== Top half ===
==== Section 1 ====
First round
(Austria) J Rodionov	6	6
WC	(Spain) C Alcaraz	4	4
(Germany) Jeremy Jahn	2	7	0
(Netherlands) B van de Zandschulp	6	5	6
WC	(Spain) C Gimeno Valero	4	2
(Belarus) U Ignatik	6	6
(Germany) Peter Heller	6	1	7
Alt	(Spain) Í Cervantes	4	6	5

Second round
1	(Germany) P Gojowczyk	6^{6}	4
(Austria) J Rodionov	7^{8}	6
(Netherlands) B van de Zandschulp	6	4
14	(Spain) M Vilella Martínez	2	1^{r}
12	(Spain) A Menéndez Maceiras	6	6
(Belarus) U Ignatik	3	2
(Germany) P Heller	5	4
5	(Spain) A Davidovich Fokina	7	6

Third round
(Austria) J Rodionov	6^{5}	6	6
(Netherlands) B van de Zandschulp	7^{7}	3	4
12	(Spain) A Menéndez Maceiras	1	0^{r}
5	(Spain) A Davidovich Fokina	6	3

Quarterfinals
(Austria) J Rodionov	4	6	6^{3}
5	(Spain) A Davidovich Fokina	6	1	7^{7}

==== Section 2 ====
First round
(France) H Grenier	6	4	6^{3}
(Turkey) A Çelikbilek	2	6	7^{7}
Alt	(Finland) H Heliövaara	4	4
(Brazil) T Seyboth Wild	6	6
(Argentina) P Cachin	6	3	0
(Italy) A Bega	3	6	6
Alt	(Netherlands) T van Rijthoven	6	0
(France) G Sakharov	2	0^{r}

Second round
4	(Germany) Y Maden	5	7	7
(Turkey) A Çelikbilek	7	5	5
(Brazil) T Seyboth Wild	3	6^{5}
15	(Finland) E Ruusuvuori	6	7^{7}
9	(Spain) P Martínez	6	6
(Italy) A Bega	4	3
Alt	(Netherlands) T van Rijthoven	7^{8}	3	6
6	(Italy) F Gaio	6^{6}	6	4

Third round
4	(Germany) Y Maden	4	3
15	(Finland) E Ruusuvuori	6	6
9	(Spain) P Martínez	6	7^{7}
Alt	(Netherlands) T van Rijthoven	3	6^{5}

Quarterfinals
15	(Finland) E Ruusuvuori	6	6
9	(Spain) P Martínez	3	1

=== Bottom half ===
==== Section 3 ====
First round
WC	(Israel) Aaron Cohen	3	2
(Serbia) D Petrović	6	6
Alt	(Spain) G Granollers	1	6^{1}
(Slovenia) B Kavčič	6	7^{7}
(Portugal) F Gil	2	2
(Italy) M Viola	6	6
Alt	(France) Imran Sibille	0	1
WC	(United Kingdom) A Murray	6	6

Second round
7	(Ukraine) S Stakhovsky	3	7^{7}	6
(Serbia) D Petrović	6	6^{3}	6^{r}
(Slovenia) B Kavčič	6	6
10	(France) Q Halys	3	2
16	(Spain) E López Pérez	6^{6}	7^{7}	0
(Italy) M Viola	7^{8}	6^{1}	6
WC	(United Kingdom) A Murray	6	6
3	(Slovakia) N Gombos	3	4

Third round
7	(Ukraine) S Stakhovsky	4	2
(Slovenia) B Kavčič	6	6
(Italy) M Viola	3	6	7^{7}
WC	(United Kingdom) A Murray	6	4	6^{3}

Quarterfinals
(Slovenia) B Kavčič	2	1
(Italy) M Viola	6	6

==== Section 4 ====
First round
(Russia) R Safiullin	6	7
WC	(Spain) P Vives Marcos	1	5
Alt	(Brazil) F Meligeni Alves	3	4
Alt	(Ukraine) I Marchenko	6	6
(Austria) L Miedler	6	6
Alt	(Venezuela) LD Martínez	2	3
(Germany) D Masur	6	6
(Turkey) C İlkel	3	4

Second round
8	(Czech Republic) L Rosol	6^{5}	1
(Russia) R Safiullin	7^{7}	6
Alt	(Ukraine) I Marchenko	6	6
11	(Israel) D Sela	4	2
13	(Argentina) C Berlocq	4	7^{9}	4
(Austria) L Miedler	6	6^{7}	6
(Germany) D Masur	2	6	6
2	(Germany) M Bachinger	6	0	4

Third round
(Russia) R Safiullin	1	2
Alt	(Ukraine) I Marchenko	6	6
(Austria) L Miedler	6	4	6^{10}
(Germany) D Masur	2	6	7^{12}

Quarterfinals
Alt	(Ukraine) I Marchenko	6^{2}	2
(Germany) D Masur	7^{7}	6
