= 2024 Rafa Nadal Open – Doubles =

Defending champions

Doubles
- 2024 Rafa Nadal Open

Final
- Champions: (Austria) David Pichler (Austria) Jurij Rodionov
- Runners-up: (India) Anirudh Chandrasekar (Spain) David Vega Hernández
- Score: 1–6, 6–3, [10–7]

Events
Singles	Doubles
- Rafa Nadal Open

Daniel Cukierman and Joshua Paris were the defending champions but only Paris chose to defend his title, partnering Ramkumar Ramanathan. They lost in the first round to Alberto Barroso Campos and Michael Geerts.

David Pichler and Jurij Rodionov won the title after defeating Anirudh Chandrasekar and David Vega Hernández 1–6, 6–3, [10–7] in the final.

== Seeds ==
1. (United Kingdom) Charles Broom / (United Kingdom) Marcus Willis (quarterfinals)
2. (United Kingdom) Joshua Paris / (India) Ramkumar Ramanathan (first round)
3. (Netherlands) David Pel / (Netherlands) Bart Stevens (quarterfinals)
4. (India) Anirudh Chandrasekar / (Spain) David Vega Hernández (final)

== Draw ==
Key

- Q = Qualifier
- WC = Wild card
- LL = Lucky loser
- Alt = Alternate
- ITF = ITF entry
- PR = Protected ranking
- SR = Special ranking
- SE = Special exempt
- JE = Junior exempt
- JR = Junior Accelerator Programme entrant
- CO = College Accelerator Programme entrant
- NG = Next Gen Accelerator Program entrant
- w/o = Walkover
- r = Retired
- d = Defaulted

=== Draw ===
First round
1	(United Kingdom) C Broom (United Kingdom) M Willis	4	6	[10]
(United Kingdom) Liam Hignett (United Kingdom) J MacKinlay	6	3	[8]
(United States) Jack Vance (United States) Jamie Vance	1	4
(Czech Republic) M Gengel (Uzbekistan) K Sultanov	6	6
3	(Netherlands) D Pel (Netherlands) B Stevens	2	6	[10]
(Syria) H Naw (Paraguay) AD Vallejo	6	3	[3]
(Austria) D Pichler (Austria) J Rodionov	6	6
(France) R Bertrand (France) L Sanchez	4	2
(France) D Added (France) A Reymond	4	4
(Switzerland) J Kym (Germany) R Molleker	6	6
WC	(Spain) Joan Nadal (Jordan) A Shelbayh	6^{6}	7^{7}	[8]
4	(India) A Chandrasekar (Spain) D Vega Hernández	7^{8}	6^{5}	[10]
(Croatia) Z Babić (Denmark) A Holmgren	6	7^{7}
WC	(Spain) Matteo Morazzi (France) Nathan Trouvé	1	6^{3}
(Spain) A Barroso Campos (Belgium) M Geerts	3	7^{7}	[10]
2	(United Kingdom) J Paris (India) R Ramanathan	6	6^{5}	[7]

Quarterfinals
1	(United Kingdom) C Broom (United Kingdom) M Willis	5	5
(Czech Republic) M Gengel (Uzbekistan) K Sultanov	7	7
3	(Netherlands) D Pel (Netherlands) B Stevens	4	5
(Austria) D Pichler (Austria) J Rodionov	6	7
(Switzerland) J Kym (Germany) R Molleker	4	7^{7}	[6]
4	(India) A Chandrasekar (Spain) D Vega Hernández	6	6^{4}	[10]
(Croatia) Z Babić (Denmark) A Holmgren	2	6	[10]
(Spain) A Barroso Campos (Belgium) M Geerts	6	3	[5]

Semifinals
(Czech Republic) M Gengel (Uzbekistan) K Sultanov	4	5
(Austria) D Pichler (Austria) J Rodionov	6	7
4	(India) A Chandrasekar (Spain) D Vega Hernández	6^{7}	6	[10]
(Croatia) Z Babić (Denmark) A Holmgren	7^{9}	1	[6]

Final
(Austria) D Pichler (Austria) J Rodionov	1	6	[10]
4	(India) A Chandrasekar (Spain) D Vega Hernández	6	3	[7]
