= 2021 Rafa Nadal Open – Singles =

Singles
- 2021 Rafa Nadal Open

Final
- Champion: (Slovakia) Lukáš Lacko
- Runner-up: (Japan) Yasutaka Uchiyama
- Score: 5–7, 7–6^{(10–8)}, 6–1

Events
Singles	Doubles
- Rafa Nadal Open

Emil Ruusuvuori was the defending champion but chose not to defend his title.

Lukáš Lacko won the title after defeating Yasutaka Uchiyama 5–7, 7–6^{(10–8)}, 6–1 in the final.

== Seeds ==
1. (Japan) Yasutaka Uchiyama (final)
2. (Spain) Fernando Verdasco (quarterfinals)
3. (United Kingdom) Liam Broady (first round)
4. (Portugal) João Sousa (quarterfinals)
5. (Austria) Sebastian Ofner (second round, retired)
6. (Chile) Marcelo Tomás Barrios Vera (second round)
7. (Poland) Kacper Żuk (first round)
8. (Slovenia) Blaž Rola (first round)

== Draw ==
Key

- Q = Qualifier
- WC = Wild card
- LL = Lucky loser
- Alt = Alternate
- ITF = ITF entry
- PR = Protected ranking
- SR = Special ranking
- SE = Special exempt
- JE = Junior exempt
- JR = Junior Accelerator Programme entrant
- CO = College Accelerator Programme entrant
- NG = Next Gen Accelerator Program entrant
- w/o = Walkover
- r = Retired
- d = Defaulted

=== Finals ===
Semifinals
1	(Japan) Yasutaka Uchiyama	4	6	7
Q	(Belgium) Michael Geerts	6	1	5
(Slovakia) Lukáš Lacko	6	6
(Germany) Tobias Kamke	0	3

Final
1	(Japan) Yasutaka Uchiyama	7	6^{8}	1
(Slovakia) Lukáš Lacko	5	7^{10}	6

=== Top half ===
First round
1	(Japan) Y Uchiyama	4	3
(Canada) S Diez	6	3^{r}
Q	(Colombia) A González	7^{7}	6^{1}	4
LL	(Poland) J Zieliński	6^{5}	7^{7}	6
(India) R Ramanathan	6^{1}	6	7
WC	(Spain) C Gómez-Herrera	7^{7}	4	5
Alt	(Ecuador) R Quiroz	7^{7}	3	2
5	(Austria) S Ofner	6^{5}	6	6
4	(Portugal) J Sousa	6	1	7
Alt	(Japan) H Moriya	4	6	5
Alt	(Spain) R Ortega Olmedo	7	7
Alt	(Colombia) N Mejía	5	5
Q	(Belgium) M Geerts	4	6	6
(Japan) T Ito	6	2	1
WC	(Spain) N Álvarez Varona	4	6^{3}
6	(Chile) MT Barrios Vera	6	7^{7}

Second round
1	(Japan) Y Uchiyama	6	6
LL	(Poland) J Zieliński	1	2
(India) R Ramanathan	7	0
5	(Austria) S Ofner	5	0^{r}
4	(Portugal) J Sousa	6	6
Alt	(Spain) R Ortega Olmedo	3	3
Q	(Belgium) M Geerts	4	6	6
6	(Chile) MT Barrios Vera	6	2	1

Quarterfinals
1	(Japan) Y Uchiyama	4	6	7^{7}
(India) R Ramanathan	6	4	6^{5}
4	(Portugal) J Sousa	6	3	4
Q	(Belgium) M Geerts	2	6	6

Semifinals
1	(Japan) Y Uchiyama	4	6	7
Q	(Belgium) M Geerts	6	1	5

=== Bottom half ===
First round
7	(Poland) K Żuk	3	4
(Bulgaria) D Kuzmanov	6	6
Q	(Germany) J Härteis	2	3
(Slovakia) L Lacko	6	6
(Australia) B Tomic	3	1
(Portugal) F Ferreira Silva	6	6
(Italy) M Viola	6	3	6
3	(United Kingdom) L Broady	4	6	4
8	(Slovenia) B Rola	4	4
(Germany) T Kamke	6	6
Q	(United States) N Chappell	6	6
Alt	(Russia) E Karlovskiy	3	1
WC	(Spain) D Rincón	3	6	1
Alt	(United States) S Kozlov	6	1	6
LL	(United States) N Moreno de Alboran	3	2
2	(Spain) F Verdasco	6	6

Second round
(Bulgaria) D Kuzmanov	2	6^{9}
(Slovakia) L Lacko	6	7^{11}
(Portugal) F Ferreira Silva	3	7	6
(Italy) M Viola	6	5	0
(Germany) T Kamke	6	6
Q	(United States) N Chappell	2	4
Alt	(United States) S Kozlov	6	6^{6}	2
2	(Spain) F Verdasco	1	7^{8}	6

Quarterfinals
(Slovakia) L Lacko	7	7
(Portugal) F Ferreira Silva	5	5
(Germany) T Kamke	6	6
2	(Spain) F Verdasco	3	1

Semifinals
(Slovakia) L Lacko	6	6
(Germany) T Kamke	0	3
