= 2026 Rafa Nadal Open – Singles =

Singles
- 2026 Rafa Nadal Open

Final
- Champion: (France) Felix Balshaw
- Runner-up: (Spain) Iñaki Montes de la Torre
- Score: 3–6, 6–2, 6–3

Events
Singles	Doubles
- Rafa Nadal Open

Daniel Rincón was the defending champion but lost in the second round to Iñaki Montes de la Torre.

Felix Balshaw won the title after defeating Montes de la Torre 3–6, 6–2, 6–3 in the final.

== Seeds ==
1. (Austria) Sebastian Ofner (first round, retired)
2. (France) Alexandre Müller (second round)
3. (Norway) Nicolai Budkov Kjær (first round)
4. (Estonia) Daniil Glinka (first round)
5. (United Kingdom) Billy Harris (quarterfinals)
6. (United Kingdom) Jack Pinnington Jones (quarterfinals, retired)
7. (Denmark) Elmer Møller (first round)
8. (Austria) Joel Schwärzler (second round)

== Draw ==
Key

- Q = Qualifier
- WC = Wild card
- LL = Lucky loser
- Alt = Alternate
- ITF = ITF entry
- PR = Protected ranking
- SR = Special ranking
- SE = Special exempt
- JE = Junior exempt
- JR = Junior Accelerator Programme entrant
- CO = College Accelerator Programme entrant
- NG = Next Gen Accelerator Program entrant
- w/o = Walkover
- r = Retired
- d = Defaulted

=== Finals ===
Semifinals
Q	(Italy) Luca Potenza	6	6^{2}	6^{2}
Alt	(Spain) Iñaki Montes de la Torre	2	7^{7}	7^{7}
Q	(Estonia) Mark Lajal	6^{7}	5
(France) Felix Balshaw	7^{9}	7

Final
Alt	(Spain) Iñaki Montes de la Torre	6	2	3
(France) Felix Balshaw	3	6	6

=== Top half ===
First round
1	(Austria) S Ofner	6	0	0^{r}
(Lithuania) E Butvilas	2	6	3
(Switzerland) R Bertola	4	6	7^{7}
(Switzerland) J Kym	6	3	6^{3}
Q	(Italy) Luca Potenza	7	2	7
(Spain) D Jordà Sanchis	5	6	5
(United Kingdom) M Basing	3	7^{7}	4
8	(Austria) J Schwärzler	6	6^{4}	6
4	(Estonia) D Glinka	6^{3}	3
(Spain) D Rincón	7^{7}	6
Alt	(Spain) I Montes de la Torre	6	3	6
Q	(France) Mathys Erhard	2	6	4
Q	(France) S Gueymard Wayenburg	6	2	2
(Italy) M Ribecai	3	6	6
(Tunisia) M Echargui	6	4	4
6	(United Kingdom) J Pinnington Jones	2	6	6

Second round
(Lithuania) E Butvilas	6	6^{5}	6
(Switzerland) R Bertola	3	7^{7}	3
Q	(Italy) L Potenza	6	6
8	(Austria) J Schwärzler	2	2
(Spain) D Rincón	2	4
Alt	(Spain) I Montes de la Torre	6	6
(Italy) M Ribecai	1	0
6	(United Kingdom) J Pinnington Jones	6	6

Quarterfinals
(Lithuania) E Butvilas	6	5	6^{6}
Q	(Italy) L Potenza	4	7	7^{8}
Alt	(Spain) I Montes de la Torre	3	6	3
6	(United Kingdom) J Pinnington Jones	6	3	0^{r}

Semifinals
Q	(Italy) L Potenza	6	6^{2}	6^{2}
Alt	(Spain) I Montes de la Torre	2	7^{7}	7^{7}

=== Bottom half ===
First round
7	(Denmark) E Møller	2	6	4
(Poland) M Kaśnikowski	6	4	6
PR	(Brazil) F Meligeni Alves	5	4
WC	(Spain) A Sánchez Quílez	7	6
WC	(Bulgaria) I Ivanov	6	6
Q	(Thailand) M Jones	0	4
Q	(Estonia) M Lajal	6	6
3	(Norway) N Budkov Kjær	3	1
5	(United Kingdom) B Harris	6	7^{7}
(France) H Grenier	2	6^{3}
Q	(Brazil) M Pucinelli de Almeida	6^{2}	3
CO	(Japan) J Friend	7^{7}	6
(Denmark) A Holmgren	6^{3}	5
(France) F Balshaw	7^{7}	7
WC	(Slovenia) Ž Šeško	4	2
2	(France) A Müller	6	6

Second round
(Poland) M Kaśnikowski	5	6^{5}
WC	(Spain) A Sánchez Quílez	7	7^{7}
WC	(Bulgaria) I Ivanov	3	7^{7}	4
Q	(Estonia) M Lajal	6	6^{4}	6
5	(United Kingdom) B Harris	7	6
CO	(Japan) J Friend	5	4
(France) F Balshaw	7	6
2	(France) A Müller	5	2

Quarterfinals
WC	(Spain) A Sánchez Quílez	2	3
Q	(Estonia) M Lajal	6	6
5	(United Kingdom) B Harris	6	6^{5}	5
(France) F Balshaw	3	7^{7}	7

Semifinals
Q	(Estonia) M Lajal	6^{7}	5
(France) F Balshaw	7^{9}	7
