= 2022 Rafa Nadal Open – Singles =

Singles
- 2022 Rafa Nadal Open

Final
- Champion: (Italy) Luca Nardi
- Runner-up: (Belgium) Zizou Bergs
- Score: 7–6^{(7–2)}, 3–6, 7–5

Events
Singles	Doubles
- Rafa Nadal Open

Lukáš Lacko was the defending champion but retired in the final round of qualifying in his match against Daniil Glinka.

Luca Nardi won the title after defeating Zizou Bergs 7–6^{(7–2)}, 3–6, 7–5 in the final.

== Seeds ==
1. (Switzerland) Dominic Stricker (first round)
2. (United Kingdom) Ryan Peniston (second round)
3. (Australia) Aleksandar Vukic (second round)
4. (Belgium) Zizou Bergs (final)
5. (France) Grégoire Barrère (first round, retired)
6. (Japan) Kaichi Uchida (first round)
7. (Italy) Luca Nardi (champion)
8. (France) Gilles Simon (withdrew)
9. (Germany) Daniel Masur (first round)

== Draw ==
Key

- Q = Qualifier
- WC = Wild card
- LL = Lucky loser
- Alt = Alternate
- ITF = ITF entry
- PR = Protected ranking
- SR = Special ranking
- SE = Special exempt
- JE = Junior exempt
- JR = Junior Accelerator Programme entrant
- CO = College Accelerator Programme entrant
- NG = Next Gen Accelerator Program entrant
- w/o = Walkover
- r = Retired
- d = Defaulted

=== Finals ===
Semifinals
WC	(Jordan) Abedallah Shelbayh	4	4
4	(Belgium) Zizou Bergs	6	6
Q	(Bulgaria) Alexandar Lazarov	7^{7}	3	1
7	(Italy) Luca Nardi	6^{1}	6	6

Final
4	(Belgium) Zizou Bergs	6^{2}	6	5
7	(Italy) Luca Nardi	7^{7}	3	7

=== Top half ===
First round
1	(Switzerland) D Stricker	2	5
WC	(Jordan) A Shelbayh	6	7
Q	(Spain) A Menéndez Maceiras	6	3	6
Q	(Estonia) D Glinka	4	6	3
Q	(France) A Olivetti	6	4	4
Alt	(Switzerland) L Riedi	3	6	6
(Kazakhstan) D Popko	5	6	6
6	(Japan) K Uchida	7	4	2
4	(Belgium) Z Bergs	6	6
WC	(Spain) D Rincón	3	2
Alt	(Poland) K Żuk	6	3	6^{7}
(France) E Furness	4	6	7^{9}
(Switzerland) A Bellier	3	6	6
Alt	(Spain) N Álvarez Varona	6	3	1
(United Kingdom) J Clarke	1	7^{8}	1
5	(France) G Barrère	6	6^{6}	1^{r}

Second round
WC	(Jordan) A Shelbayh	6	4
Q	(Spain) A Menéndez Maceiras	1	1^{r}
Alt	(Switzerland) L Riedi	7^{7}	4	1
(Kazakhstan) D Popko	6^{3}	6	6
4	(Belgium) Z Bergs	6	7^{10}
(France) E Furness	3	6^{8}
(Switzerland) A Bellier	4	4
(United Kingdom) J Clarke	6	6

Quarterfinals
WC	(Jordan) A Shelbayh	5	6	6
(Kazakhstan) D Popko	7	3	1
4	(Belgium) Z Bergs	6	6
(United Kingdom) J Clarke	3	2

Semifinals
WC	(Jordan) A Shelbayh	4	4
4	(Belgium) Z Bergs	6	6

=== Bottom half ===
First round
9	(Germany) D Masur	6	6^{1}	3
(Brazil) M Pucinelli de Almeida	3	7^{7}	6
Alt	(Kazakhstan) M Kukushkin	6	2	6
(Italy) F Maestrelli	2	6	2
Alt	(Serbia) H Međedović	1	3
Q	(Bulgaria) A Lazarov	6	6
(France) L Lokoli	6	1	6^{1}
3	(Australia) A Vukic	1	6	7^{7}
7	(Italy) L Nardi	3	6	6
(Netherlands) J de Jong	6	1	2
Q	(Czech Republic) M Gengel	3	4
Alt	(Turkey) A Çelikbilek	6	6
PR	(Austria) S Ofner	3	4
WC	(Poland) J Janowicz	6	6
Q	(Paraguay) D Vallejo	1	2
2	(United Kingdom) R Peniston	6	6

Second round
(Brazil) M Pucinelli de Almeida	2	4
Alt	(Kazakhstan) M Kukushkin	6	6
Q	(Bulgaria) A Lazarov	6	4	6
3	(Australia) A Vukic	3	6	4
7	(Italy) L Nardi	6	7
Alt	(Turkey) A Çelikbilek	4	5
WC	(Poland) J Janowicz	6	6
2	(United Kingdom) R Peniston	2	4

Quarterfinals
Alt	(Kazakhstan) M Kukushkin	7^{7}	4	6^{3}
Q	(Bulgaria) A Lazarov	6^{4}	6	7^{7}
7	(Italy) L Nardi	6	3	6
WC	(Poland) J Janowicz	2	6	1

Semifinals
Q	(Bulgaria) A Lazarov	7^{7}	3	1
7	(Italy) L Nardi	6^{1}	6	6
