= 2021 Rafa Nadal Open – Doubles =

Doubles
- 2021 Rafa Nadal Open

Final
- Champions: (Poland) Karol Drzewiecki (Spain) Sergio Martos Gornés
- Runners-up: (Brazil) Fernando Romboli (Poland) Jan Zieliński
- Score: 6–4, 4–6, [10–3]

Events
| Singles | Doubles |
- Rafa Nadal Open

Sander Arends and David Pel were the defending champions but chose not to defend their title.

Karol Drzewiecki and Sergio Martos Gornés won the title after defeating Fernando Romboli and Jan Zieliński 6–4, 4–6, [10–3] in the final.

== Seeds ==
1. (Mexico) Hans Hach Verdugo / (Mexico) Miguel Ángel Reyes-Varela (semifinals)
2. (Brazil) Fernando Romboli / (Poland) Jan Zieliński (final)
3. (India) Sriram Balaji / (India) Ramkumar Ramanathan (semifinals)
4. (Poland) Karol Drzewiecki / (Spain) Sergio Martos Gornés (champions)

== Draw ==
Key

- Q = Qualifier
- WC = Wild card
- LL = Lucky loser
- Alt = Alternate
- ITF = ITF entry
- PR = Protected ranking
- SR = Special ranking
- SE = Special exempt
- JE = Junior exempt
- JR = Junior Accelerator Programme entrant
- CO = College Accelerator Programme entrant
- NG = Next Gen Accelerator Program entrant
- w/o = Walkover
- r = Retired
- d = Defaulted

First round
1 | (Mexico) H Hach Verdugo (Mexico) MÁ Reyes-Varela | 6 | 6
WC | (Israel) Aaron Cohen (Germany) Rafael Giotis | 0 | 2
WC | (Spain) Antoni Nadal (Spain) Joan Nadal | 2 | 2
(United States) N Chappell (United States) R Stalder | 6 | 6
4 | (Poland) K Drzewiecki (Spain) S Martos Gornés | 7^{7} | 6
(Belgium) M Geerts (South Africa) R Roelofse | 6^{3} | 2
(Colombia) N Mejía (Ecuador) R Quiroz | 5 | 5
(Croatia) B Gojo (Poland) K Żuk | 7 | 7
(Chile) MT Barrios Vera (Spain) C Gómez-Herrera | 6 | 6
(United States) J Cerretani (United States) JA Ore | 4 | 3
(Germany) F Fallert (Poland) P Matuszewski | 2 | 1
3 | (India) S Balaji (India) R Ramanathan | 6 | 6
WC | (China) Tan Jinpeng (France) Nathan Trouvé | 4 | 1
(Philippines) R Gonzales (United States) H Johnson | 6 | 6
(Japan) T Matsui (Japan) K Uesugi | 7 | 6^{3} | [10]
2 | (Brazil) F Romboli (Poland) J Zieliński | 5 | 7^{7} | [12]

Quarterfinals
1 | (Mexico) H Hach Verdugo (Mexico) MÁ Reyes-Varela | 7^{7} | 6
(United States) N Chappell (United States) R Stalder | 6^{4} | 2
4 | (Poland) K Drzewiecki (Spain) S Martos Gornés | w/o
(Croatia) B Gojo (Poland) K Żuk
(Chile) MT Barrios Vera (Spain) C Gómez-Herrera | 3 | 0
3 | (India) S Balaji (India) R Ramanathan | 6 | 6
(Philippines) R Gonzales (United States) H Johnson | 6 | 1 | [11]
2 | (Brazil) F Romboli (Poland) J Zieliński | 3 | 6 | [13]

Semifinals
1 | (Mexico) H Hach Verdugo (Mexico) MÁ Reyes-Varela | 6^{5} | 6 | [8]
4 | (Poland) K Drzewiecki (Spain) S Martos Gornés | 7^{7} | 4 | [10]
3 | (India) S Balaji (India) R Ramanathan | 2 | 6^{2}
2 | (Brazil) F Romboli (Poland) J Zieliński | 6 | 7^{7}

Final
4 | (Poland) K Drzewiecki (Spain) S Martos Gornés | 6 | 4 | [10]
2 | (Brazil) F Romboli (Poland) J Zieliński | 4 | 6 | [3]
