= 2018 Rafa Nadal Open Banc Sabadell – Singles =

Singles
- 2018 Rafa Nadal Open Banc Sabadell

Final
- Champion: (Australia) Bernard Tomic
- Runner-up: (Germany) Matthias Bachinger
- Score: 4–6, 6–3, 7–6^{(7–3)}

Events
| Singles | Doubles |
- Rafa Nadal Open Banc Sabadell

This was the first edition of the tournament.

Bernard Tomic won the title after defeating Matthias Bachinger 4–6, 6–3, 7–6^{(7–3)} in the final.

== Seeds ==
1. (Italy) Thomas Fabbiano (quarterfinals)
2. (Spain) Pablo Andújar (second round)
3. (India) Ramkumar Ramanathan (second round)
4. (Ukraine) Sergiy Stakhovsky (second round)
5. (Germany) Mats Moraing (first round)
6. (Australia) Bernard Tomic (champion)
7. (Spain) Enrique López Pérez (semifinals)
8. (Spain) Sergio Gutiérrez Ferrol (first round)

== Draw ==
Key

- Q = Qualifier
- WC = Wild card
- LL = Lucky loser
- Alt = Alternate
- ITF = ITF entry
- PR = Protected ranking
- SR = Special ranking
- SE = Special exempt
- JE = Junior exempt
- JR = Junior Accelerator Programme entrant
- CO = College Accelerator Programme entrant
- NG = Next Gen Accelerator Program entrant
- w/o = Walkover
- r = Retired
- d = Defaulted

=== Finals ===
Semifinals
(Germany) Matthias Bachinger | 6 | 6
7 | (Spain) Enrique López Pérez | 4 | 3
(France) Kenny de Schepper | 3 | 4
6 | (Australia) Bernard Tomic | 6 | 6

Final
(Germany) Matthias Bachinger | 6 | 3 | 6^{3}
6 | (Australia) Bernard Tomic | 4 | 6 | 7^{7}

=== Top half ===
First round
1 | (Italy) T Fabbiano | 7 | 6
Q | (Netherlands) T van Rijthoven | 5 | 3
(Germany) O Otte | 6 | 7^{7}
(Netherlands) T Griekspoor | 4 | 6^{2}
(Spain) R Ojeda Lara | 2 | 2
(Germany) M Bachinger | 6 | 6
Q | (Germany) Tobias Simon | 6 | 6
8 | (Spain) S Gutiérrez Ferrol | 3 | 2
3 | (India) R Ramanathan | 6 | 7^{7}
Q | (France) E Couacaud | 3 | 6^{3}
Alt | (United Kingdom) J Ward | 7^{8} | 6^{2} | 6^{4}
WC | (Spain) N Kuhn | 6^{6} | 7^{7} | 7^{7}
(Italy) L Vanni | 2 | 3
Q | (Russia) T Gabashvili | 6 | 6
(Austria) L Miedler | 6 | 6^{6} | 4
7 | (Spain) E López Pérez | 3 | 7^{8} | 6

Second round
1 | (Italy) T Fabbiano | 6 | 6
(Germany) O Otte | 0 | 2
(Germany) M Bachinger | 6 | 0
Q | (Germany) T Simon | 1 | 0^{r}
3 | (India) R Ramanathan | 7^{7} | 6^{2} | 4
WC | (Spain) N Kuhn | 6^{4} | 7^{7} | 6
Q | (Russia) T Gabashvili | 2 | 4
7 | (Spain) E López Pérez | 6 | 6

Quarterfinals
1 | (Italy) T Fabbiano | 6 | 2 | 2
(Germany) M Bachinger | 3 | 6 | 6
WC | (Spain) N Kuhn | 1 | 6^{8}
7 | (Spain) E López Pérez | 6 | 7^{10}

Semifinals
(Germany) M Bachinger | 6 | 6
7 | (Spain) E López Pérez | 4 | 3

=== Bottom half ===
First round
5 | (Germany) M Moraing | 5 | 2
(Germany) D Brands | 7 | 6
(Portugal) J Domingues | 3 | 3
Alt | (United Kingdom) D Evans | 6 | 6
WC | (Spain) R Ortega Olmedo | 6^{5} | 4
(France) K de Schepper | 7^{7} | 6
WC | (Ecuador) E Gómez | 4 | 6^{6}
4 | (Ukraine) S Stakhovsky | 6 | 7^{8}
6 | (Australia) B Tomic | 6 | 6
Alt | (Spain) M Vilella Martínez | 1 | 2
LL | (Brazil) J Menezes | 6 | 5 | 2
Alt | (Argentina) P Cachin | 2 | 7 | 6
(Slovakia) N Gombos | 6 | 6
WC | (Spain) A Davidovich Fokina | 3 | 4
(Portugal) G Oliveira | 2 | 1
2 | (Spain) P Andújar | 6 | 6

Second round
(Germany) D Brands | 6 | 7^{8}
Alt | (United Kingdom) D Evans | 4 | 6^{6}
(France) K de Schepper | 6 | 6
4 | (Ukraine) S Stakhovsky | 2 | 4
6 | (Australia) B Tomic | 6 | 6
Alt | (Argentina) P Cachin | 2 | 4
(Slovakia) N Gombos | 6 | 6
2 | (Spain) P Andújar | 4 | 2

Quarterfinals
(Germany) D Brands | 1 | 2
(France) K de Schepper | 6 | 6
6 | (Australia) B Tomic | 6 | 6
(Slovakia) N Gombos | 3 | 4

Semifinals
(France) K de Schepper | 3 | 4
6 | (Australia) B Tomic | 6 | 6
