= 2025 Rafa Nadal Open =

- Date: 26 August – 1 September
- Edition: 7th
- Surface: Hard
- Location: Manacor, Spain

Champions

Singles
- (Spain) Daniel Rincón

Doubles
- (Spain) Alberto Barroso Campos / (Colombia) Adrià Soriano Barrera
- Rafa Nadal Open

The 2025 Rafa Nadal Open was a professional tennis tournament played on hard courts. It was the seventh edition of the tournament which was part of the 2025 ATP Challenger Tour. It took place in Manacor, Spain between 26 August and 1 September 2025.

== Singles main-draw entrants ==
=== Seeds ===
Country	Player	Rank^{1}	Seed
FIN	Otto Virtanen	123	1
ESP	Martín Landaluce	138	2
FRA	Harold Mayot	152	3
AUT	Jurij Rodionov	154	4
FRA	Calvin Hemery	185	5
LBN	Benjamin Hassan	203	6
FRA	Sascha Gueymard Wayenburg	208	7
~~CRO~~	~~Borna Gojo~~	~~213~~	~~8~~

- ^{1} Rankings are as of 18 August 2025.

=== Other entrants ===
The following players received wildcards into the singles main draw:

- (Spain) John Echeverría
- (Bulgaria) Ivan Ivanov
- (Jordan) Abdullah Shelbayh

The following player received entry into the singles main draw through the College Accelerator programme:

- (Japan) Jay Dylan Friend

The following player received entry into the singles main draw through the Junior Accelerator programme:

- (Colombia) Miguel Tobón

The following players received entry into the singles main draw as alternates:

- (Ivory Coast) Eliakim Coulibaly
- (France) Matteo Martineau
- (Spain) Daniel Rincón

The following players received entry from the qualifying draw:

- (Spain) Alberto Barroso Campos
- (Belgium) Michael Geerts
- (Germany) Daniel Masur
- (United Kingdom) Stuart Parker
- (Switzerland) Jakub Paul
- (United Kingdom) Hamish Stewart

The following player received entry as a lucky loser:

- (Colombia) Adrià Soriano Barrera

== Champions ==
=== Singles ===
- (Spain) Daniel Rincón def. (Austria) Jurij Rodionov 7–6^{(7–3)}, 6–2.

=== Doubles ===
- (Spain) Alberto Barroso Campos / (Colombia) Adrià Soriano Barrera def. (Austria) David Pichler / (Austria) Jurij Rodionov 7–6^{(7–2)}, 3–6, [10–2].
