= 2021 Rafa Nadal Open =

- Date: 30 August – 5 September
- Edition: 3rd
- Surface: Hard
- Location: Manacor, Spain

Champions

Singles
- (Slovakia) Lukáš Lacko

Doubles
- (Poland) Karol Drzewiecki / (Spain) Sergio Martos Gornés
- Rafa Nadal Open

The 2021 Rafa Nadal Open was a professional tennis tournament played on hard courts. It was the third edition of the tournament which was part of the 2021 ATP Challenger Tour. It took place in Manacor, Spain between 30 August and 5 September 2021.

== Singles main-draw entrants ==
=== Seeds ===
Country	Player	Rank^{1}	Seed
JPN	Yasutaka Uchiyama	123	1
ESP	Fernando Verdasco	132	2
GBR	Liam Broady	147	3
POR	João Sousa	149	4
AUT	Sebastian Ofner	166	5
CHI	Marcelo Tomás Barrios Vera	172	6
POL	Kacper Żuk	173	7
SLO	Blaž Rola	179	8

- ^{1} Rankings are as of 23 August 2021.

=== Other entrants ===
The following players received wildcards into the singles main draw:

- (Spain) Nicolás Álvarez Varona
- (Spain) Carlos Gómez-Herrera
- (Spain) Daniel Rincón

The following players received entry into the singles main draw as alternates:

- (Russia) Evgeny Karlovskiy
- (United States) Stefan Kozlov
- (Colombia) Nicolás Mejía
- (Japan) Hiroki Moriya
- (Spain) Roberto Ortega Olmedo
- (Ecuador) Roberto Quiroz

The following players received entry from the qualifying draw:

- (United States) Nick Chappell
- (Belgium) Michael Geerts
- (Colombia) Alejandro González
- (Germany) Johannes Härteis

The following players received entry as lucky losers:

- (United States) Nicolas Moreno de Alboran
- (Poland) Jan Zieliński

== Champions ==
=== Singles ===
- (Slovakia) Lukáš Lacko def. (Japan) Yasutaka Uchiyama 5–7, 7–6^{(10–8)}, 6–1.

=== Doubles ===
- (Poland) Karol Drzewiecki / (Spain) Sergio Martos Gornés def. (Brazil) Fernando Romboli / (Poland) Jan Zieliński 6–4, 4–6, [10–3].
