= 2018 Rafa Nadal Open Banc Sabadell =

- Date: 28 August – 2 September
- Edition: 1st
- Surface: Hard
- Location: Manacor, Spain

Champions

Singles
- (Australia) Bernard Tomic

Doubles
- (Uruguay) Ariel Behar / (Spain) Enrique López Pérez
- Rafa Nadal Open Banc Sabadell

The 2018 Rafa Nadal Open Banc Sabadell was a professional tennis tournament played on hard courts. It was the first edition of the tournament which was part of the 2018 ATP Challenger Tour. It took place in Manacor, Spain between 28 August – 2 September 2018.

== Singles main-draw entrants ==
=== Seeds ===
| Country | Player | Rank^{1} | Seed |
|---|---|---|---|
| ITA | Thomas Fabbiano | 110 | 1 |
| ESP | Pablo Andújar | 127 | 2 |
| IND | Ramkumar Ramanathan | 134 | 3 |
| UKR | Sergiy Stakhovsky | 138 | 4 |
| GER | Mats Moraing | 152 | 5 |
| AUS | Bernard Tomic | 153 | 6 |
| ESP | Enrique López Pérez | 159 | 7 |
| ESP | Sergio Gutiérrez Ferrol | 164 | 8 |

- ^{1} Rankings are as of 20 August 2018.

=== Other entrants ===
The following players received wildcards into the singles main draw:

- (Spain) Alejandro Davidovich Fokina
- (Ecuador) Emilio Gómez
- (Spain) Nicola Kuhn
- (Spain) Roberto Ortega Olmedo

The following players received entry into the singles main draw as alternates:

- (Argentina) Pedro Cachin
- (United Kingdom) Dan Evans
- (Spain) Mario Vilella Martínez
- (United Kingdom) James Ward

The following players received entry from the qualifying draw:

- (France) Enzo Couacaud
- (Russia) Teymuraz Gabashvili
- (Germany) Tobias Simon
- (Netherlands) Tim van Rijthoven

The following player received entry as a lucky loser:

- (Brazil) João Menezes

== Champions ==
=== Singles ===
- (Australia) Bernard Tomic def. (Germany) Matthias Bachinger 4–6, 6–3, 7–6^{(7–3)}.

=== Doubles ===
- (Uruguay) Ariel Behar / (Spain) Enrique López Pérez def. (United Kingdom) Dan Evans / (Spain) Gerard Granollers walkover.
