= David Pichler (tennis) =

Austrian tennis player (born 1996)

- Country (sports): Austria
- Born: 19 February 1996 (age 30) Eisenstadt, Austria
- Height: 1.78 m (5 ft 10 in)
- Plays: Right-handed (two-handed backhand)
- Prize money: $224,096

Singles
- Career record: 0–0
- Career titles: 3 ITF
- Highest ranking: No. 390 (16 October 2017)
- Current ranking: No. 957 (23 February 2026)

Doubles
- Career record: 1–2
- Career titles: 5 Challenger, 49 ITF
- Highest ranking: No. 95 (13 October 2025)
- Current ranking: No. 101 (23 February 2026)
- Last updated on: 27 February 2026.

David Pichler (born 19 February 1996) is an Austrian tennis player. Pichler has a career high ATP doubles ranking of world No. 95 achieved on 13 October 2025 and a career high singles ranking of No. 390 achieved on 16 October 2017.

== Career ==
Pichler won an ATP Challenger doubles title at the 2024 Rafa Nadal Open with Jurij Rodionov.

== ATP Challenger finals ==
=== Doubles: 9 (5 titles, 4 runner-ups) ===
Finals by surface
Hard (2–1)
Clay (3–3)

Result	W–L	Date	Tournament	Surface	Partner	Opponents	Score
Loss	0–1	Dec 2021	Maia, Portugal	Clay (i)	(Poland) Piotr Matuszewski	(Portugal) Nuno Borges (Portugal) Francisco Cabral	4–6, 5–7
Loss	0–2	Mar 2024	Kigali, Rwanda	Clay	(India) S D Prajwal Dev	(Australia) Thomas Fancutt (United States) Hunter Reese	1–6, 5–7
Loss	0–3	May 2024	Augsburg, Germany	Clay	(Czech Republic) Michael Vrbenský	(Germany) Mark Wallner (Germany) Jakob Schnaitter	6–3, 2–6, [8–10]
Win	1–3	Aug 2024	Manacor, Spain	Hard	(Austria) Jurij Rodionov	(India) Anirudh Chandrasekar (Spain) David Vega Hernández	1–6, 6–3, [10–7]
Win	2–3	Aug 2025	Sofia, Bulgaria	Clay	(Croatia) Nino Serdarušić	(Romania) Alexandru Jecan (Romania) Bogdan Pavel	4–6, 7–6^{(7–2)}, [10–7]
Loss	2–4	Aug 2025	Manacor, Spain	Hard	(Austria) Jurij Rodionov	(Spain) Alberto Barroso Campos (Colombia) Adrià Soriano Barrera	6–7^{(2–7)}, 6–3, [2–10]
Win	3–4	Sep 2025	Cassis Open, France	Hard	(Austria) Jurij Rodionov	(France) Arthur Reymond (France) Luca Sanchez	7–6^{(7–2)}, 6–4
Win	4–4	Sep 2025	Szczecin Open, Poland	Clay	(Ukraine) Denys Molchanov	Ivan Liutarevich (Spain) Bruno Pujol Navarro	3–6, 7–6^{(7–1)}, [10–6]
Win	5–4	Sep 2025	Layjet Open, Austria	Clay	(Croatia) Nino Serdarušić	(Czech Republic) Jiří Barnat (Czech Republic) Filip Duda	6–3, 6–3
