= 2019 Rafa Nadal Open Banc Sabadell =

- Date: 26 August – 1 September
- Edition: 2nd
- Surface: Hard
- Location: Manacor, Spain

Champions

Singles
- (Finland) Emil Ruusuvuori

Doubles
- (Netherlands) Sander Arends / (Netherlands) David Pel
- Rafa Nadal Open Banc Sabadell

The 2019 Rafa Nadal Open Banc Sabadell was a professional tennis tournament played on hard courts. It was the second edition of the tournament which was part of the 2019 ATP Challenger Tour. It took place in Manacor, Spain between 26 August and 1 September 2019.

== Singles main-draw entrants ==
=== Seeds ===
Country	Player	Rank^{1}	Seed
GER	Peter Gojowczyk	88	1
GER	Matthias Bachinger	115	2
SVK	Norbert Gombos	116	3
GER	Yannick Maden	122	4
ESP	Alejandro Davidovich Fokina	126	5
ITA	Federico Gaio	144	6
UKR	Sergiy Stakhovsky	146	7
CZE	Lukáš Rosol	150	8
ESP	Pedro Martínez	152	9
FRA	Quentin Halys	162	10
ISR	Dudi Sela	167	11
ESP	Adrián Menéndez Maceiras	193	12
ARG	Carlos Berlocq	199	13
ESP	Mario Vilella Martínez	202	14
FIN	Emil Ruusuvuori	208	15
ESP	Enrique López Pérez	219	16

- ^{1} Rankings are as of 19 August 2019.

=== Other entrants ===
The following players received wildcards into the singles main draw:

- (Spain) Carlos Alcaraz
- (Israel) Aaron Cohen
- (Spain) Carlos Gimeno Valero
- (United Kingdom) Andy Murray
- (Spain) Perdo Vives Marcos

The following players received entry into the singles main draw as alternates:

- (Spain) Íñigo Cervantes
- (Spain) Gerard Granollers
- (Finland) Harri Heliövaara
- (Ukraine) Illya Marchenko
- (Venezuela) Luis David Martínez
- (Brazil) Felipe Meligeni Alves
- (France) Imran Sibille
- (Netherlands) Tim van Rijthoven

== Champions ==
=== Singles ===
- (Finland) Emil Ruusuvuori def. (Italy) Matteo Viola 6–0, 6–1.

=== Doubles ===
- (Netherlands) Sander Arends / (Netherlands) David Pel def. (Poland) Karol Drzewiecki / (Poland) Szymon Walków 7–5, 6–4.
