= 2022 Rafa Nadal Open =

- Date: 29 August – 4 September
- Edition: 4th
- Surface: Hard
- Location: Manacor, Spain

Champions

Singles
- (Italy) Luca Nardi

Doubles
- (India) Yuki Bhambri / (India) Saketh Myneni
- Rafa Nadal Open

The 2022 Rafa Nadal Open was a professional tennis tournament played on hard courts. It was the fourth edition of the tournament which was part of the 2022 ATP Challenger Tour. It took place in Manacor, Spain between 29 August and 4 September 2022.

== Singles main-draw entrants ==
=== Seeds ===
Country	Player	Rank^{1}	Seed
SUI	Dominic Stricker	127	1
GBR	Ryan Peniston	130	2
AUS	Aleksandar Vukic	134	3
BEL	Zizou Bergs	155	4
FRA	Grégoire Barrère	167	5
JPN	Kaichi Uchida	169	6
ITA	Luca Nardi	173	7
~~FRA~~	~~Gilles Simon~~	~~177~~	~~8~~
GER	Daniel Masur	191	9

- ^{1} Rankings are as of 22 August 2022.

=== Other entrants ===
The following players received wildcards into the singles main draw:

- (Poland) Jerzy Janowicz
- (Spain) Daniel Rincón
- (Jordan) Abedallah Shelbayh

The following player received entry into the singles main draw using a protected ranking:

- (Austria) Sebastian Ofner

The following players received entry into the singles main draw as alternates:

- (Spain) Nicolás Álvarez Varona
- (Turkey) Altuğ Çelikbilek
- (Kazakhstan) Mikhail Kukushkin
- (Serbia) Hamad Međedović
- (Switzerland) Leandro Riedi
- (Poland) Kacper Żuk

The following players received entry from the qualifying draw:

- (Czech Republic) Marek Gengel
- (Estonia) Daniil Glinka
- (Bulgaria) Alexandar Lazarov
- (Spain) Adrián Menéndez Maceiras
- (France) Albano Olivetti
- (Paraguay) Daniel Vallejo

== Champions ==
=== Singles ===
- (Italy) Luca Nardi def. (Belgium) Zizou Bergs 7–6^{(7–2)}, 3–6, 7–5.

=== Doubles ===
- (India) Yuki Bhambri / (India) Saketh Myneni def. (Czech Republic) Marek Gengel / (Czech Republic) Lukáš Rosol 6–2, 6–2.
