= David Vega Hernández =

Spanish tennis player (born 1994)

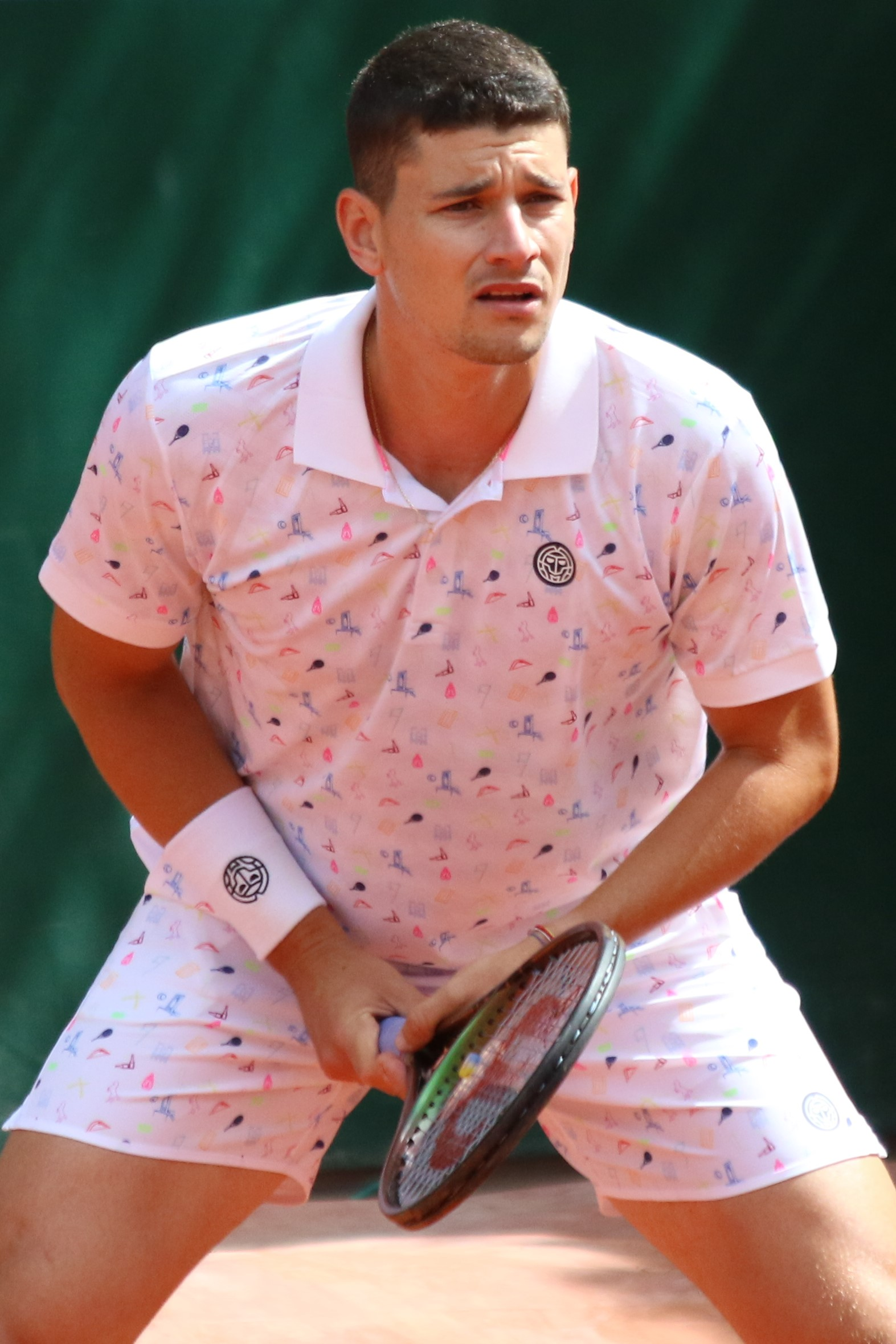
- Vega Hernández at the 2022 French Open
- Country (sports): Spain
- Born: 23 June 1994 (age 32) Telde, Spain
- Height: 1.88 m (6 ft 2 in)
- Turned pro: 2012
- Plays: Right-handed (two-handed backhand)
- Coach: Toni Colom
- Prize money: $621,057

Singles
- Career record: 0–1 (at ATP Tour level, Grand Slam level, and in Davis Cup)
- Career titles: 0
- Highest ranking: No. 403 (21 July 2014)

Doubles
- Career record: 55–56 (at ATP Tour level, Grand Slam level, and in Davis Cup)
- Career titles: 5
- Highest ranking: No. 28 (13 February 2023)
- Current ranking: No. 123 (15 January 2024)

Grand Slam doubles results
- Australian Open: 1R (2023)
- French Open: QF (2022)
- Wimbledon: 3R (2022)
- US Open: 1R (2023)

Grand Slam mixed doubles results
- Australian Open: QF (2023)
- French Open: 1R (2023)
- Wimbledon: 1R (2022)
- US Open: QF (2022)
- Last updated on: 19 January 2024.

David Vega Hernández (Spanish pronunciation: [daˈβið ˈβeɣa eɾˈnandeθ]; (Note: In isolation, Vega is pronounced [ˈbeɣa].) born 23 June 1994) is a Spanish professional tennis player. He has a career-high ATP doubles ranking of world No. 28 achieved on 21 July 2014. He also has a career high ATP singles ranking of No. 403 achieved on 13 February 2023. Hernández has won five ATP Tour doubles titles. He competes mainly on the ATP Challenger Tour where he has won 13 doubles titles.

== Professional career ==
=== 2015: ATP debut in singles ===
Vega Hernández made his ATP main draw debut at the 2015 Estoril Open in the singles draw, entering as a lucky loser.

=== 2021: First ATP title and Top 100 debut in doubles ===
Hernández won his first ATP doubles title at the 2021 Croatia Open Umag partnering Fernando Romboli defeating top seeds Tomislav Brkić from Bosnia and Herzegovina and Nikola Ćaćić from Serbia. As a result, he made his top 100 debut on 26 July 2021 at World No. 98.

=== 2022: New partnership & Four titles, Major debut & quarterfinal, top 35 ===
In April, Vega Hernández won his second ATP 250 doubles title at the 2022 Grand Prix Hassan II alongside new partner Rafael Matos.

At the 2022 BMW Open he reached his second final with Matos and third overall. At the 2022 French Open on his Grand Slam debut the pair reached the third round with a win over Łukasz Kubot and Édouard Roger-Vasselin but not before defeating 13th seeded pair of Santiago González and Andrés Molteni. They reached the quarterfinals where they lost to 12th seeded pair of Marcelo Arévalo and Jean-Julien Rojer. As a result, Vega Hernández reached the top 50 in the rankings.

Vega Hernández reached world No. 32 on 31 October 2022 following a fourth title for the season at the 2022 Sofia Open and a final showing at the ATP 500 2022 Rakuten Japan Open Tennis Championships with Matos.

=== 2023: Top 30 debut, loss of form, drop in the rankings ===
Following the 2023 Australian Open he reached the top 30 on 30 January 2023. He reached the semifinals at the 2023 Córdoba Open with Rafael Matos saving a match point.

== ATP career finals ==
=== Doubles: 7 (5 titles, 2 runner-ups) ===
| Legend Grand Slam tournaments (0–0) ATP World Tour Finals (0–0) ATP World Tour Masters 1000 (0–0) ATP World Tour 500 Series (0–1) ATP World Tour 250 Series (5–1) | Titles by surface Hard (1–1) Clay (3–1) Grass (1–0) | Titles by setting Outdoor (5–2) Indoor (0–0) |

| Result | W–L | Date | Tournament | Tier | Surface | Partner | Opponents | Score |
|---|---|---|---|---|---|---|---|---|
| Win | 1–0 | Jul 2021 | Croatia Open, Croatia | 250 Series | Clay | (Brazil) Fernando Romboli | (Bosnia and Herzegovina) Tomislav Brkić (Serbia) Nikola Ćaćić | 6–3, 7–5 |
| Win | 2–0 | Apr 2022 | Grand Prix Hassan II, Morocco | 250 Series | Clay | (Brazil) Rafael Matos | (Italy) Andrea Vavassori (Poland) Jan Zieliński | 6–1, 7–5 |
| Loss | 2–1 | May 2022 | Bavarian Championships, Germany | 250 Series | Clay | (Brazil) Rafael Matos | (Germany) Kevin Krawietz (Germany) Andreas Mies | 6–4, 4–6, [7–10] |
| Win | 3–1 | Jun 2022 | Mallorca Championships, Spain | 250 Series | Grass | (Brazil) Rafael Matos | (Uruguay) Ariel Behar (Ecuador) Gonzalo Escobar | 7–6^{7–5}, 6–7^{6–8}, [10–1] |
| Win | 4–1 | Jul 2022 | Swedish Open, Sweden | 250 Series | Clay | (Brazil) Rafael Matos | (Italy) Simone Bolelli (Italy) Fabio Fognini | 6–4, 3–6, [13–11] |
| Win | 5–1 | Oct 2022 | Sofia Open, Bulgaria | 250 Series | Hard (i) | (Brazil) Rafael Matos | (Germany) Fabian Fallert (Germany) Oscar Otte | 3–6, 7–5, [10–8] |
| Loss | 5–2 | Oct 2022 | Japan Open, Japan | 500 Series | Hard | (Brazil) Rafael Matos | (United States) Mackenzie McDonald (Brazil) Marcelo Melo | 4–6, 6–3, [4–10] |

== ATP Challenger and ITF Futures finals ==
=== Singles: 7 (3–4) ===
| Legend (singles) ATP Challenger Tour (0–0) ITF Futures Tour (3–4) | Titles by surface Hard (1–3) Clay (1–1) Grass (0–0) Carpet (1–0) |

| Result | W–L | Date | Tournament | Tier | Surface | Opponent | Score |
|---|---|---|---|---|---|---|---|
| Win | 1–0 | Jul 2013 | Spain F23, Dénia | Futures | Clay | (Russia) Alexander Rumyantsev | 6–4, 6–3 |
| Loss | 1–1 | Sep 2013 | Spain F31, Getafe | Futures | Clay | (Spain) Oriol Roca Batalla | 5–7, 3–6 |
| Win | 2–1 | May 2014 | Portugal F4, Termas de Monfortinho | Futures | Carpet | (France) Fabrice Martin | 5–7, 7–6^{(7–2)}, 6–3 |
| Loss | 2–2 | Jun 2014 | Spain F13, Martos | Futures | Hard | (Denmark) Frederik Nielsen | 3–6, 2–6 |
| Win | 3–2 | Aug 2015 | Spain F24, Ourense | Futures | Hard | (Spain) Ricardo Ojeda Lara | 6–3, 4–6, 7–5 |
| Loss | 3–3 | Aug 2015 | Spain F25, Béjar | Futures | Hard | (Spain) Pablo Vivero González | 2–6, 2–6 |
| Loss | 3–4 | Mar 2018 | Portugal F3, Loulé | Futures | Hard | (Portugal) Frederico Ferreira Silva | 7–5, 1–6, 1–3 ret. |

=== Doubles: 79 (41–38) ===
| Legend (doubles) ATP Challenger Tour (17–15) ITF Futures Tour (24–23) | Titles by surface Hard (12–16) Clay (27–21) Carpet (2–1) Grass (0–0) |

| Result | W–L | Date | Tournament | Tier | Surface | Partner | Opponents | Score |
|---|---|---|---|---|---|---|---|---|
| Win | 1–0 | May 2013 | Portugal F6, Monfortinho | Futures | Carpet | (Spain) Adam Sanjurjo Hermida | (Portugal) Gonçalo Falcão (Portugal) Vasco Mensurado | 4–6, 6–2, [10–6] |
| Loss | 1–1 | Jun 2013 | Spain F18, Melilla | Futures | Hard | (Spain) Eduard Esteve Lobato | (Spain) Iván Arenas-Gualda (Spain) Jaime Pulgar-García | 2–6, 6–7^{(1–7)} |
| Win | 2–1 | Jul 2013 | Spain F23, Dénia | Futures | Clay | (Spain) Juan Lizariturry | (Spain) Ricardo Ojeda Lara (Spain) Oriol Roca Batalla | 6–3, 0–6, [10–8] |
| Loss | 2–2 | Nov 2013 | Spain F39, Puerto de la Cruz | Futures | Carpet | (Spain) David Pérez Sanz | (Spain) Carlos Boluda-Purkiss (Spain) Roberto Ortega Olmedo | 1–6, 3–6 |
| Win | 3–2 | Nov 2013 | Spain F40, Puerto de la Cruz | Futures | Carpet | (Spain) Juan-Samuel Arauzo-Martínez | (Colombia) Juan Sebastián Gómez (Spain) Adam Sanjurjo Hermida | 6–1, 2–6, [10–6] |
| Loss | 3–3 | Feb 2014 | Spain F3, Murcia | Futures | Clay | (Spain) Sergio Gutiérrez Ferrol | (Sweden) Markus Eriksson (Sweden) Milos Sekulic | 0–6, 6–7^{(5–7)} |
| Win | 4–3 | Mar 2014 | Italy F6, Santa Margherita di Pula | Futures | Clay | (Spain) Roberto Carballés Baena | (Italy) Filippo Baldi (Italy) Pietro Licciardi | 6–4, 6–4 |
| Win | 5–3 | Apr 2014 | Italy F8, Santa Margherita di Pula | Futures | Clay | (Spain) Jaume Pla Malfeito | (Italy) Matteo Fago (Italy) Manuel Mazzella | 6–4, 2–6, [10–4] |
| Loss | 5–4 | Apr 2014 | Italy F9, Santa Margherita di Pula | Futures | Clay | (Spain) Oriol Roca Batalla | (Italy) Francesco Borgo (Italy) Stefano Travaglia | 4–6, 6–7^{(5–7)} |
| Win | 6–4 | Jun 2014 | Spain F13, Martos | Futures | Hard | (Spain) Iván Arenas-Gualda | (Italy) Erik Crepaldi (Spain) Borja Rodríguez Manzano | 7–6^{(7–3)}, 6–7^{(7–9)}, [10–8] |
| Loss | 6–5 | Jun 2014 | Spain F14, Melilla | Futures | Hard | (Spain) Iván Arenas-Gualda | (Spain) David Pérez Sanz (Bolivia) Federico Zeballos | 4–6, 7–6^{(7–5)}, [5–10] |
| Loss | 6–6 | Jul 2014 | Spain F19, Dénia | Futures | Clay | (Spain) Juan-Samuel Arauzo-Martínez | (Australia) Maverick Banes (Australia) Jake Eames | w/o |
| Loss | 6–7 | Mar 2015 | Portugal F3, Loulé | Futures | Hard | (Portugal) João Domingues | (Portugal) Romain Barbosa (Portugal) Leonardo Tavares | 1–6, 6–4, [10–12] |
| Loss | 6–8 | May 2015 | Portugal F4, Caldas da Rainha | Futures | Clay | (Portugal) João Domingues | (Portugal) Fred Gil (Portugal) Frederico Ferreira Silva | 3–6, 2–6 |
| Win | 7–8 | Aug 2015 | Spain F24, Ourense | Futures | Hard | (Spain) Ricardo Villacorta-Alonso | (Spain) Marc Fornell Mestres (Spain) Marco Neubau | 3–6, 6–3, [10–4] |
| Win | 8–8 | Oct 2015 | Portugal F13, Porto | Futures | Clay | (Spain) Iván Arenas-Gualda | (Portugal) Nuno Deus (Portugal) João Domingues | 6–3, 6–0 |
| Loss | 8–9 | Nov 2015 | Tunisia F32, El Kantaoui | Futures | Hard | (Spain) Samuel Ribeiro Navarrete | (Venezuela) Jordi Muñoz Abreu (Spain) David Pérez Sanz | 4–6, 5–7 |
| Loss | 8–10 | Dec 2015 | Tunisia F34, El Kantaoui | Futures | Hard | (Spain) David Pérez Sanz | (Tunisia) Anis Ghorbel (Bulgaria) Vasko Mladenov | 7–6^{(7–2)}, 4–6, [8–10] |
| Loss | 8–11 | Feb 2016 | Spain F4, Murcia | Futures | Clay | (Spain) Adria Mas Mascolo | (Romania) Vasile Antonescu (Romania) Alexandru Jecan | 6–4, 5–7, [9–11] |
| Loss | 8–12 | Feb 2016 | Portugal F1, Vale do Lobo | Futures | Hard | (Spain) Carlos Boluda-Purkiss | (Spain) Iván Arenas-Gualda (Spain) Roberto Ortega Olmedo | 6–4, 6–7^{(4–7)}, [6–10] |
| Win | 9–12 | Mar 2016 | Tunisia F11, Hammamet | Futures | Clay | (Spain) Eduard Esteve Lobato | (Russia) Aleksandr Malyshev (Russia) Maksim Malyshev | 5–7, 7–5, [10–3] |
| Win | 10–12 | Apr 2016 | Tunisia F12, Hammamet | Futures | Clay | (Spain) Oriol Roca Batalla | (Australia) Dan Dowson (United Kingdom) Alexander Ward | 6–4, 6–2 |
| Loss | 10–13 | Apr 2016 | Spain F9, Reus | Futures | Clay | (Spain) Adria Mas Mascolo | (Spain) Juan-Samuel Arauzo-Martínez (Spain) Marcos Giraldi Requena | 6–3, 3–6, [8–10] |
| Win | 11–13 | May 2016 | Spain F12, Lleida | Futures | Clay | (India) Ramkumar Ramanathan | (Spain) Carlos Boluda-Purkiss (Australia) Alex de Minaur | 6–3, 6–1 |
| Loss | 11–14 | May 2016 | Spain F15, Sta. Margarida Montbui | Futures | Hard | (Spain) Carlos Boluda-Purkiss | (Spain) Jan Pallares Monreal (Spain) Albert Roglan | 3–6, 7–6^{(7–4)}, [8–10] |
| Win | 12–14 | Jun 2016 | Spain F16, Huelva | Futures | Clay | (Spain) Iván Arenas-Gualda | (Belgium) Niels Desein (Morocco) Lamine Ouahab | 6–4, 6–2 |
| Win | 13–14 | Sep 2016 | Spain F31, Sevilla | Futures | Clay | (Spain) Gerard Granollers Pujol | (Spain) Eduard Esteve Lobato (Spain) Sergio Martos Gornés | 6–2, 7–5 |
| Win | 14–14 | Oct 2016 | Spain F34, Melilla | Futures | Clay | (Spain) Carlos Boluda-Purkiss | (Spain) Albert Alcaraz Ivorra (Spain) Mario Vilella Martínez | 6–7^{(9–11)}, 7–6^{(7–5)}, [10–6] |
| Loss | 14–15 | Nov 2016 | Spain F36, Cuevas del Almanzora | Futures | Hard | (Spain) Roberto Ortega Olmedo | (Spain) Javier Barranco Cosano (Italy) Raúl Brancaccio | 3–6, 0–6 |
| Loss | 14–16 | Nov 2016 | Spain F37, Cuevas del Almanzora | Futures | Hard | (Spain) Roberto Ortega Olmedo | (Spain) Jaume Pla Malfeito (Spain) Mario Vilella Martínez | 6–7^{(4–7)}, 6–2, [5–10] |
| Win | 15–16 | Nov 2016 | Spain F38, Cuevas del Almanzora | Futures | Hard | (Spain) Mario Vilella Martínez | (Spain) Jorge Hernando Ruano (Spain) Pablo Vivero González | 6–4, 7–6^{(7–5)} |
| Loss | 15–17 | Dec 2016 | Spain F39, Cuevas del Almanzora | Futures | Hard | (Spain) Roberto Ortega Olmedo | (Republic of Ireland) Peter Bothwell (Japan) Akira Santillan | 2–6, 7–5, [2–10] |
| Loss | 15–18 | Jan 2017 | Spain F1, Manacor | Futures | Clay | (Spain) Sergio Martos Gornés | (Spain) Pedro Martínez (Spain) Ricardo Ojeda Lara | 7–6^{(7–5)}, 0–6, [4–10] |
| Win | 16–18 | Feb 2017 | Spain F5, Murcia | Futures | Clay | (Russia) Ivan Gakhov | (Spain) Pedro Martínez (Spain) Oriol Roca Batalla | 5–7, 6–3, [10–8] |
| Win | 17–18 | Mar 2017 | Portugal F3, Loulé | Futures | Hard | (Spain) Roberto Ortega Olmedo | (Spain) Carlos Gómez-Herrera (United Kingdom) Nikki Roenn | 6–4, 7–5 |
| Loss | 17–19 | Apr 2017 | Portugal F4, Lisbon | Futures | Hard | (Belgium) Yannick Mertens | (Portugal) Felipe Cunha Silva (Portugal) João Monteiro | 3–6, 5–7 |
| Loss | 17–20 | Apr 2017 | Portugal F6, Porto | Futures | Clay | (Spain) Roberto Ortega Olmedo | (Portugal) João Monteiro (Brazil) Bruno Sant'Anna | 6–4, 3–6, [8–10] |
| Loss | 17–21 | Apr 2017 | Portugal F7, Carcavelos | Futures | Clay | (Portugal) Frederico Ferreira Silva | (Portugal) Felipe Cunha Silva (Portugal) Fred Gil | 6–4, 3–6, [7–10] |
| Loss | 17–22 | May 2017 | Spain F13, Valldoreix | Futures | Clay | (Spain) Pedro Martínez | (Brazil) Igor Marcondes (Brazil) Rafael Matos | 7–6^{(7–4)}, 6–7^{(6–8)}, [10–12] |
| Win | 18–22 | May 2017 | Romania F2, Bacău | Futures | Clay | (Portugal) Frederico Ferreira Silva | (Romania) Vasile Antonescu (Romania) Patrick Grigoriu | 7–5, 6–3 |
| Win | 19–22 | Jul 2017 | Spain F19, Bakio | Futures | Hard | (Spain) Roberto Ortega Olmedo | (Spain) Carlos Gómez-Herrera (Spain) Juan Lizariturry | 6–3, 6–2 |
| Win | 20–22 | Jul 2017 | Spain F20, Getxo | Futures | Clay | (Russia) Ivan Gakhov | (Spain) Carlos Gómez-Herrera (Spain) Juan Lizariturry | 3–6, 6–3, [10–6] |
| Loss | 20–23 | Aug 2017 | Segovia, Spain | Challenger | Hard | (Spain) Roberto Ortega Olmedo | (Spain) Adrián Menéndez Maceiras (Ukraine) Sergiy Stakhovsky | 6–4, 3–6, [7–10] |
| Loss | 20–24 | Sep 2017 | Seville, Spain | Challenger | Clay | (Russia) Ivan Gakhov | (Spain) Íñigo Cervantes Huegun (Argentina) Pedro Cachin | 6–7^{(5–7)}, 6–3, [5–10] |
| Win | 21–24 | Sep 2017 | Spain F29, Sevilla | Futures | Clay | (Spain) Pedro Martínez | (Spain) Marc Giner (Spain) Jaume Pla Malfeito | 3–6, 6–4, [10–5] |
| Win | 22–24 | Jan 2018 | Spain F2, Manacor | Futures | Clay | (Italy) Lorenzo Giustino | (Italy) Pietro Rondoni (Italy) Jacopo Stefanini | 7–5, 7–5 |
| Loss | 22–25 | Feb 2018 | Spain F3, Paguera | Futures | Clay | (Brazil) Bruno Sant'Anna | (South Korea) Chung Yun-seong (Japan) Rio Noguchi | 6–2, 6–7^{(6–8)}, [8–10] |
| Win | 23–25 | Mar 2018 | Portugal F3, Loulé | Futures | Hard | (Spain) Roberto Ortega Olmedo | (Austria) Maximilian Neuchrist (Austria) David Pichler | 4–6, 6–4, [10–3] |
| Win | 24–25 | Jun 2018 | Blois, France | Challenger | Clay | (Brazil) Fabrício Neis | (Chinese Taipei) Hsieh Cheng-peng (Australia) Rameez Junaid | 7–6^{(7–4)}, 6–1 |
| Win | 25–25 | Jul 2018 | Marburg, Germany | Challenger | Clay | (Brazil) Fabrício Neis | (Switzerland) Henri Laaksonen (Switzerland) Luca Margaroli | 4–6, 6–4, [10–8] |
| Win | 26–25 | Jul 2018 | Germany F8, Kassel | Futures | Clay | (Brazil) João Souza | (Brazil) Orlando Luz (Brazil) Marcelo Zormann | 6–1, 6–4 |
| Loss | 26–26 | Jul 2018 | Prague, Czech Republic | Challenger | Clay | (Brazil) Fernando Romboli | (Belgium) Sander Gillé (Belgium) Joran Vliegen | 4–6, 2–6 |
| Win | 27–26 | Sep 2018 | Biella, Italy | Challenger | Clay | (Brazil) Fabrício Neis | (Australia) Rameez Junaid (India) Purav Raja | 6–4, 6–4 |
| Win | 28–26 | Oct 2018 | Barcelona, Spain | Challenger | Clay | (Brazil) Marcelo Demoliner | (Australia) Rameez Junaid (Netherlands) David Pel | 7–6^{(7–3)}, 6–3 |
| Loss | 28–27 | Apr 2019 | Francavilla, Italy | Challenger | Clay | (Argentina) Guillermo Durán | (Ukraine) Denys Molchanov (Slovakia) Igor Zelenay | 3–6, 1–6 |
| Win | 29–27 | Jun 2019 | Poznań, Poland | Challenger | Clay | (Italy) Andrea Vavassori | (Spain) Pedro Martínez (Netherlands) Mark Vervoort | 6–4, 6–7^{(4–7)}, [10–6] |
| Loss | 29–28 | Jul 2019 | Recanati, Italy | Challenger | Hard | (Italy) Andrea Vavassori | (Portugal) Gonçalo Oliveira (India) Ramkumar Ramanathan | 2–6, 4–6 |
| Win | 30–28 | Oct 2019 | Barcelona, Spain | Challenger | Clay | (Italy) Simone Bolelli | (Spain) Sergio Martos Gornés (India) Ramkumar Ramanathan | 6–4, 7–5 |
| Loss | 30–29 | Oct 2019 | Brest, France | Challenger | Hard (i) | (Italy) Andrea Vavassori | (Ukraine) Denys Molchanov (Belarus) Andrei Vasilevski | 3–6, 1–6 |
| Loss | 30–30 | Nov 2019 | Maia, Portugal | Challenger | Clay (i) | (Spain) Guillermo García López | (Germany) Andre Begemann (Germany) Daniel Masur | 6–7^{(2–7)}, 4–6 |
| Loss | 30–31 | Jan 2021 | Antalya, Turkey | Challenger | Clay | (Venezuela) Luis David Martínez | (Ukraine) Denys Molchanov (Kazakhstan) Aleksandr Nedovyesov | 6–3, 4–6, [16–18] |
| Win | 31–31 | Feb 2021 | Biella, Italy | Challenger | Hard (i) | (Venezuela) Luis David Martinez | (Poland) Szymon Walków (Poland) Jan Zieliński | 6–4, 3–6, [10–8] |
| Loss | 31–32 | June 2021 | Biella, Italy | Challenger | Clay | (Venezuela) Luis David Martínez | (Argentina) Tomás Martín Etcheverry (Argentina) Renzo Olivo | 6–3, 3–6, [8–10] |
| Win | 32–32 | Sep 2021 | Seville, Spain | Challenger | Clay | (Netherlands) Mark Vervoort | (Spain) Javier Barranco Cosano (Spain) Sergio Martos Gornés | 6–3, 6–7^{(7–9)}, [10–7] |
| Win | 33–32 | Oct 2021 | Alicante, Spain | Challenger | Hard | (Ukraine) Denys Molchanov | (Monaco) Romain Arneodo (Australia) Matt Reid | 6–4, 6–2 |
| Loss | 33–33 | Nov 2021 | Pau, France | Challenger | Hard (i) | (Pakistan) Aisam-ul-Haq Qureshi | (Monaco) Romain Arneodo (Austria) Tristan-Samuel Weissborn | 4–6, 2–6 |
| Loss | 33–34 | Nov 2021 | Bari, Italy | Challenger | Hard | (Italy) Andrea Vavassori | (United Kingdom) Lloyd Glasspool (Finland) Harri Heliövaara | 3–6, 0–6 |
| Win | 34–34 | Jan 2022 | Quimper, France | Challenger | Hard (i) | (France) Albano Olivetti | (Netherlands) Sander Arends (Netherlands) David Pel | 3–6, 6–4, [10–8] |
| Win | 35–34 | Feb 2022 | Pau, France | Challenger | Hard (i) | (France) Albano Olivetti | (Poland) Karol Drzewiecki (Poland) Kacper Żuk | w/o |
| Loss | 35–35 | Apr 2022 | Madrid, Spain | Challenger | Clay | (Brazil) Rafael Matos | (Czech Republic) Adam Pavlásek (Slovakia) Igor Zelenay | 3–6, 6–3, [6–10] |
| Win | 36–35 | May 2022 | Bordeaux, France | Challenger | Clay | (Brazil) Rafael Matos | (Monaco) Hugo Nys (Poland) Jan Zieliński | 6–4, 6–0 |
| Loss | 36–36 | Aug 2024 | Manacor, Spain | Challenger | Hard | (India) Anirudh Chandrasekar | (Austria) David Pichler (Austria) Jurij Rodionov | 6–1, 3–6, [7–10] |
| Win | 37–36 | Sep 2024 | Genoa, Italy | Challenger | Clay | (Lebanon) Benjamin Hassan | (Monaco) Romain Arneodo (France) Théo Arribagé | 6–4, 7–5 |
| Win | 38–36 | Mar 2025 | Girona, Spain | Challenger | Clay | (India) Anirudh Chandrasekar | (France) Grégoire Jacq (Brazil) Orlando Luz | 6–4, 6–4 |
| Win | 39–36 | May 2025 | Oeiras, Portugal | Challenger | Clay | (Germany) Andreas Mies | (Brazil) Marcelo Demoliner (Austria) David Pichler | 6–4, 6–4 |
| Win | 40–36 | Feb 2026 | Tenerife, Spain | Challenger | Hard | (Jordan) Abdullah Shelbayh | (Spain) Pablo Llamas Ruiz (Spain) Benjamín Winter López | 6–2, 6–4 |
| Loss | 40–37 | May 2026 | Oeiras, Portugal | Challenger | Clay | (Portugal) Tiago Pereira | (India) Siddhant Banthia (Bulgaria) Alexander Donski | 3–6, 2–6 |
| Loss | 40–38 | May 2026 | Cervia, Italy | Challenger | Clay | (Argentina) Santiago Rodríguez Taverna | (Italy) Francesco Forti (Italy) Filippo Romano | 3–6, 4–6 |
| Win | 41–38 | Aug 2026 | Manacor, Spain | Challenger | Hard | (Spain) Alberto Barroso Campos | (Denmark) Johannes Ingildsen (Denmark) Oskar Brostrøm Poulsen | 7–5, 7–6^{(7–5)} |
