= Jurij Rodionov =

Austrian tennis player

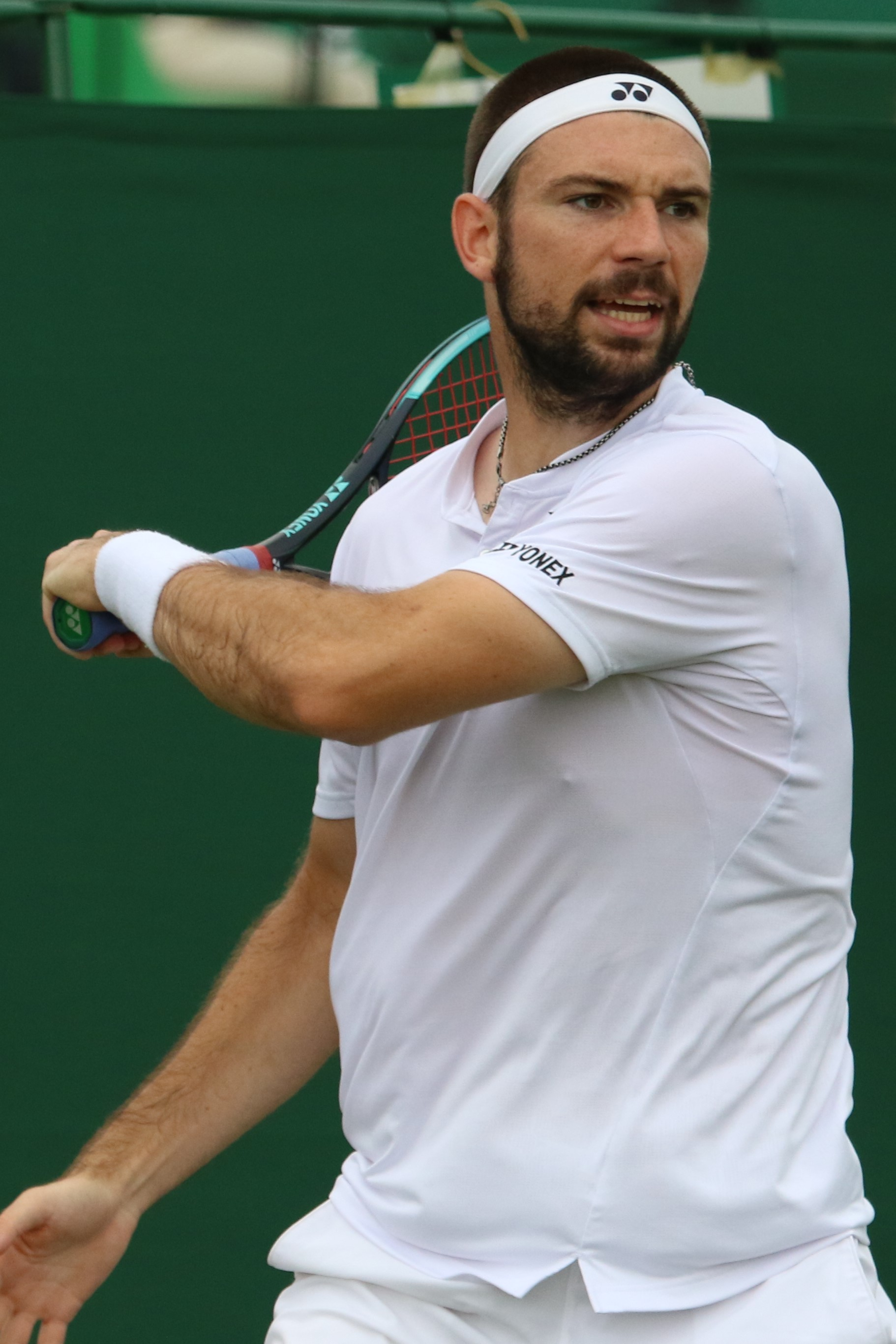
- Rodionov at the 2023 Wimbledon Championships
- Country (sports): Austria
- Residence: Matzen, Austria
- Born: 16 May 1999 (age 27) Nuremberg, Germany
- Height: 1.91 m (6 ft 3 in)
- Turned pro: 2017
- Plays: Left-handed (two-handed backhand)
- Coach: Gary Muller, Florian Pernhaupt
- Prize money: US $1,794,895

Singles
- Career record: 23–32
- Career titles: 0
- Highest ranking: No. 87 (19 February 2024)
- Current ranking: No. 137 (19 October 2026)

Grand Slam singles results
- Australian Open: Q2 (2019, 2022, 2023, 2026)
- French Open: 2R (2020)
- Wimbledon: Q2 (2022, 2023, 2026)
- US Open: 2R (2026)

Doubles
- Career record: 2–5
- Career titles: 0
- Highest ranking: No. 199 (14 July 2025)
- Current ranking: No. 423 (31 August 2026)

Team competitions
- Davis Cup: QF (2025 Davis Cup)
- Last updated on: 31 October 2026.

Jurij Rodionov (born 16 May 1999) is an Austrian professional tennis player. He has a career-high ATP singles ranking of world No. 87 achieved on 19 February 2024. He also has a career-high doubles ranking of No. 199 achieved on 14 July 2025. He is the current No. 2 Austrian player.

== Personal life ==
Rodionov is of Belarusian descent; his parents moved from Belarus to Nuremberg in 1996, where Rodionov was born, before later relocating to Austria.

== Professional career ==
=== 2018–20: Major debut, Three Challenger titles, top 150, top-15 win ===
Rodionov won three ATP Challenger singles titles. The first came at the 2018 Almaty Challenger. His second title came when he won the 2020 RBC Tennis Championships of Dallas. His third title came at the 2020 Morelos Open. In 2019, he won his maiden ATP Challenger doubles title at the Shymkent Challenger.

Rodionov made his main draw Grand Slam debut at the 2020 French Open as qualifier and reached the second round with a win over Jérémy Chardy in five sets.

He reached the top 150 on 12 October 2020 at World No. 148. Also in October 2020, as a wildcard, he had the biggest win of his career in Vienna, where he beat eight seed and World No. 12 Denis Shapovalov in straight sets. He lost in the second round to Dan Evans.

=== 2021: Maiden ATP semifinal ===
Rodionov reached as a wildcard his maiden quarterfinal after the retirement of Peter Gojowczyk and then the semifinal after defeating Alex de Minaur at the 2021 MercedesCup in Stuttgart before retiring due to injury in the match with eventual champion Marin Čilić. As a result of this run, he reached a career-high ranking of World No. 135 on 14 June 2021.

=== 2022: Two more Challenger titles, top 125, Austrian No. 1 ===
He won two more Challenger titles in March and May. As a result, he became the Austrian No. 1 player on 9 May 2022 and reached a career-high ranking of World No. 124 on 23 May 2022.

=== 2023–24: Masters debut, top 100 ===
In March 2023 he won his sixth Challenger overall and first of the 2023 season in Biel, Switzerland where he was the defending champion. He reached a career-high ranking in the top 120 of No. 118 on 17 April 2023. Ranked No. 119, he qualified for his first Masters 1000 at the 2023 Mutua Madrid Open.

Ranked No. 132, he entered the main draw of the 2023 French Open as a lucky loser where he lost for the second time to qualifier Lucas Pouille, having lost to him also in the last round of qualifying. He reached the top 100 on 28 August 2023.

At the 2023 Astana Open he reached the quarterfinals as a qualifier, defeating second seed Sebastián Báez, before losing to eventual champion sixth seed Adrian Mannarino.

Ranked No. 96, he entered the 2024 BNP Paribas Open as a lucky loser.

== Davis Cup ==
Rodionov represents Austria at the Davis Cup, where he has a W/L record of 0–3. He made his debut at the 2019 Davis Cup qualifying round against Nicolás Jarry of Chile.

=== Participations: (7–5) ===
Group membership World Group / Finals (1–0) Qualifying Round (3–4) World Group I (3–1) World Group II (0–0) Group III (0–0) Group IV (0–0)	Matches by surface Hard (3–3) Clay (4–2) Grass (0–0) Carpet (0–0)	Matches by type Singles (7–5) Doubles (0–0)

- ▲ ▼ indicates the outcome of the Davis Cup match followed by the score, date, place of event, the zonal classification and its phase, and the court surface.

Rubber outcome	No.	Rubber	Match type (partner if any)	Opponent nation	Opponent player(s)	Score
▼2–3; 1–2 February 2019; Salzburgarena, Salzburg, Austria; Davis Cup qualifying round; clay (indoor) surface
Defeat	1	I	Singles	Chile	Nicolás Jarry	5–7, 5–7
Defeat	2	V	Singles	Chile	Cristian Garín	2–6, 1–6
▲3–1; 6–7 March 2020; Steiermarkhalle, Premstätten, Austria; Davis Cup qualifying round; hard (indoor) surface
Defeat	3	II	Singles	Uruguay	Pablo Cuevas	7–6^{(9–7)}, 3–6, 6–7^{(5–7)}
▼1–2; 28 November 2021; Olympiahalle, Innsbruck, Austria; Davis Cup Final Group F round robin; hard (indoor) surface
Victory	4	I	Singles	Germany	Dominik Koepfer	6–1, 7–5
▼1–3; 4-5 March 2022; Olympic Park Tennis Court, Seoul, South Korea; Davis Cup qualifying round; hard (indoor) surface
Defeat	5	II	Singles	South Korea	Kwon Soon-woo	5–7, 4–6
▲4–0; 16–17 September 2022; Tennis Club Tulln, Tulln an der Donau, Austria; World Group I first round; clay surface
Victory	6	I	Singles	Pakistan	Muhammad Shoaib Khan	6–3, 6–1
Victory	7	IV	Singles	Pakistan	Muzammil Murtaza	6–2, 6–2
▼1–3; 15–16 September 2023; Multiversum Schwechat, Schwechat, Austria; World Group I first round; hard (indoor) surface
Defeat	8	I	Singles	Portugal	Nuno Borges	6–7^{(4–7)}, 6–3, 3–6
▲3–0; 13–14 September 2024; Sportaktivpark Bad Waltersdorf, Bad Waltersdorf, Austria; Davis Cup World Group I first round; clay surface
Victory	9	I	Singles	Turkey	Yankı Erel	6–3, 6–4
▲4–0; 31 January–1 February 2025; Multiversum Schwechat, Schwechat, Austria; Davis Cup Qualifiers first round; clay (indoor) surface
Victory	10	II	Singles	Finland	Eero Vasa	2–6, 6–3, 6–3
▲3–2; 12–13 September 2025; Főnix Aréna, Debrecen, Hungary; Davis Cup Qualifiers second round; hard (indoor) surface
Victory	11	I	Singles	Hungary	Fábián Marozsán	6–2, 6–7^{(5–7)}, 7–5
Victory	12	V	Singles	Hungary	Márton Fucsovics	6–2, 6–1

== Singles performance timeline ==
Key
W	F	SF	QF	#R	RR	Q#	P#	DNQ	A	Z#	PO	G	S	B	NMS	NTI	P	NH

(W) winner; (F) finalist; (SF) semifinalist; (QF) quarterfinalist; (#R) rounds 4, 3, 2, 1; (RR) round-robin stage; (Q#) qualification round; (DNQ) did not qualify; (A) absent; (NH) not held; (SR) strike rate (events won / competed); (W–L) win–loss record.
To avoid confusion and double counting, these charts are updated at the conclusion of a tournament or when the player's participation has ended.

Current through the 2026 French Open.

Tournament	2017	2018	2019	2020	2021	2022	2023	2024	2025	2026	SR	W–L
Grand Slam tournaments
Australian Open	A	A	Q2	A	Q1	Q2	Q2	A	Q1	Q2	0 / 0	0–0
French Open	A	A	Q1	2R	Q1	Q2	1R	Q1	Q3	1R	0 / 3	1–3
Wimbledon	A	A	Q1	NH	A	Q2	Q2	Q1	Q1		0 / 0	0–0
US Open	A	A	A	A	Q3	A	Q1	Q3	Q1		0 / 0	0–0
Win–loss	0–0	0–0	0–0	1–1	0–0	0–0	0–1	0–0	0–0	0–1	0 / 3	1–3
National representation
Davis Cup	A	A	QR	RR		G1	G1	G1	QF		0 / 1	7–6
ATP Masters 1000
Indian Wells Open	A	A	A	NH	A	A	A	1R	A	A	0 / 1	0–1
Miami Open	A	A	A	NH	A	A	A	Q1	A	A	0 / 0	0–0
Madrid Open	A	A	A	NH	A	A	1R	Q1	A	A	0 / 1	0–1
Italian Open	A	A	A	A	A	A	Q1	Q1	A	A	0 / 0	0–0
Career statistics
Overall win–loss	0–0	0–1	0–4	2–3	4–4	4–5	5–7	2–3	3–2	2–1	22–30	
Year-end ranking	503	217	299	144	136	122	115	175	176		42%	

== ATP Challenger finals ==
=== Singles: 17 (9 titles, 8 runners-up) ===
Finals by surface
Hard (6–4)
Clay (3–2)
Grass (0–2)

Result	W–L	Date	Tournament	Surface	Opponent	Score
Win	1–0	Jun 2018	Almaty, Kazakhstan	Clay	(Serbia) Peđa Krstin	7–5, 6–2
Win	2–0	Feb 2020	Dallas, USA	Hard (i)	(United States) Denis Kudla	7–5, 7–6^{(12–10)}
Win	3–0	Feb 2020	Cuernavaca, Mexico	Hard	(Argentina) Juan Pablo Ficovich	4–6, 6–2, 6–3
Loss	3–1	Feb 2021	Nur-Sultan, Kazakhstan	Hard (i)	(United States) Mackenzie McDonald	1–6, 2–6
Win	4–1	Mar 2022	Biel/Bienne, Switzerland	Hard (i)	(Poland) Kacper Żuk	7-6^{(7–3)}, 6–4
Win	5–1	May 2022	Mauthausen, Austria	Clay	(Czech Republic) Jiří Lehečka	6–4, 6–4
Win	6–1	Mar 2023	Biel/Bienne(2), Switzerland	Hard (i)	(United Kingdom) Liam Broady	6–3, 0–0 ret.
Loss	6–2	Jun 2023	Surbiton, United Kingdom	Grass	(United Kingdom) Andy Murray	3–6, 2–6
Win	7–2	Jan 2024	Koblenz, Germany	Hard (i)	(United States) Brandon Nakashima	6–7^{(7–9)}, 6–1, 6–2
Loss	7–3	Sep 2024	Cassis, France	Hard	(France) Richard Gasquet	6–3, 1–6, 2–6
Loss	7–4	Nov 2024	Kobe, Japan	Hard	(Belgium) Alexander Blockx	3–6, 1–6
Win	8–4	Aug 2025	Bonn, Germany	Clay	(Kazakhstan) Timofey Skatov	3–6, 6–2, 6–4
Loss	8–5	Aug 2025	Manacor, Spain	Clay	(Spain) Daniel Rincón	6–7^{(3–7)}, 2–6
Loss	8–6	Jan 2026	Nouméa, New Caledonia	Hard	(France) Arthur Géa	3–6, 6–4, 5–7
Loss	8–7	Apr 2026	Madrid, Spain	Clay	(Hungary) Zsombor Piros	5–7, 2–6
Loss	8–8	Jun 2026	Dublin, Ireland	Grass	(United Kingdom) Henry Searle	4–6, 2–6
Win	9–8	Nov 2026	Bratislava, Slovakia	Hard (i)	(Switzerland) Jérôme Kym	6–2, 6–1

=== Doubles: 6 (4 titles, 2 runner-ups) ===
Finals by surface
Hard (2–1)
Clay (2–1)

Result	W–L	Date	Tournament	Surface	Partner	Opponents	Score
Win	1–0	May 2019	Shymkent, Kazakhstan	Clay	(Finland) Emil Ruusuvuori	(Portugal) Gonçalo Oliveira (Belarus) Andrei Vasilevski	6–4, 3–6, [10–8]
Win	2–0	Jul 2024	Zug, Switzerland	Clay	(Ukraine) Volodymyr Uzhylovskyi	(Japan) Seita Watanabe (Japan) Takeru Yuzuki	7–6^{(7–5)}, 7–6^{(7–5)}
Win	3–0	Aug 2024	Manacor, Spain	Hard	(Austria) David Pichler	(India) Anirudh Chandrasekar (Spain) David Vega Hernández	1–6, 6–3, [10–7]
Loss	3–1	May 2025	Prague, Czech Republic	Clay	(Austria) David Pichler	(Ukraine) Denys Molchanov (Czech Republic) Matěj Vocel	6–7^{(3–7)}, 3–6
Loss	3–2	Aug 2025	Manacor, Spain	Hard	(Austria) David Pichler	(Spain) Alberto Barroso Campos (Colombia) Adrià Soriano Barrera	6–7^{(2–7)}, 6–3, [2–10]
Win	4–2	Sep 2025	Cassis, France	Hard	(Austria) David Pichler	(France) Arthur Reymond (France) Luca Sanchez	7–6^{(7–2)}, 6–4

== Junior Grand Slam finals ==
=== Doubles: 1 (1 runner-up) ===
Result	Year	Tournament	Surface	Partner	Opponents	Score
Loss	2017	Wimbledon	Grass	(Czech Republic) Michael Vrbenský	(Chinese Taipei) Hsu Yu-hsiou (Argentina) Axel Geller	4–6, 4–6

== Wins over top 10 players ==
- Jurij Rodionov has a 0–2 (0%) record against players who were, at the time the match was played, ranked in the top 10.

Season	2024	2025	Total
Wins	0	0	0

*As of 24 October 2025
