= Adrià Soriano Barrera =

Colombian tennis player (born 1999)

- Country (sports): Colombia (2023–present); Spain (–2023)
- Born: 2 June 1999 (age 27) Barcelona, Spain
- Height: 1.91 m (6 ft 3 in)
- Plays: Right-handed (two-handed backhand)
- College: University of Miami
- Prize money: US$ 111,462

Singles
- Career record: 3–4
- Career titles: 0
- Highest ranking: No. 289 (28 July 2025)
- Current ranking: No. 385 (30 March 2026)

Doubles
- Career record: 0–0
- Career titles: 0; 2 Challenger
- Highest ranking: No. 262 (30 March 2026)
- Current ranking: No. 262 (30 March 2026)
- Last updated on: 30 March 2026.

Adrià Soriano Barrera (born 2 June 1999) is a Spanish-born Colombian professional tennis player. He has a career-high ATP singles ranking of No. 289 achieved on 28 July 2025 and a best doubles ranking of No. 262 achieved on 30 March 2026. He is currently the No. 3 Colombian player.

Soriano Barrera played college tennis at University of Miami.

He currently represents Colombia at the Davis Cup, where he has a win/loss record of 2–3.

== Career ==
Soriano Barrera has won one ATP Challenger Tour doubles title at the 2025 Rafa Nadal Open, with Alberto Barroso Campos.

== ATP Challenger Tour finals ==
=== Doubles: 4 (2 title, 2 runner-ups) ===
Legend ATP Challenger Tour (2–2)

Result	W–L	Date	Tournament	Tier	Surface	Partner	Opponents	Score
Loss	0–1	Jun 2025	Tyler Tennis Championships, US	Challenger	Hard	(Spain) Àlex Martínez	(New Zealand) Finn Reynolds (New Zealand) James Watt	3–6, 1–6
Win	1–1	Aug 2025	Rafa Nadal Open, Spain	Challenger	Hard	(Spain) Alberto Barroso Campos	(Austria) David Pichler (Austria) Jurij Rodionov	7–6^{(7–2)}, 3–6, [10–2]
Win	2–1	Jan 2026	Glasgow Challenger, United Kingdom	Challenger	Hard	(Germany) Christoph Negritu	(United Kingdom) Charles Broom (United Kingdom) Ben Jones	2–6, 6–2, [10–4]
Loss	2–2	Mar 2026	Bucaramanga Challenger, Colombia	Challenger	Clay	(Ukraine) Vladyslav Orlov	(Colombia) Juan Sebastián Gómez (Chile) Matías Soto	2–6, 4–6

== ITF Tour finals ==
=== Singles: 14 (7 titles, 7 runner-ups) ===
Legend ITF WTT (7–7)	Finals by surface Hard (7–7) Clay (0–0)

Result	W–L	Date	Tournament	Tier	Surface	Opponent	Score
Loss	0–1	Dec 2021	M15 Monastir, Tunisia	WTT	Hard	(United States) Omni Kumar	7–5, 6–4
Win	1–1	Sep 2022	M25 Setúbal, Portugal	WTT	Hard	(Switzerland) Jérôme Kym	7–6^{(9–7)}, 6–3
Win	2–1	Nov 2022	M15 Monastir, Tunisia	WTT	Hard	(France) Robin Bertrand	6–3, 6–3
Loss	2–2	Mar 2024	M15 Torelló, Spain	WTT	Hard	(Turkey) Ergi Kırkın	6–7^{(8–10)}, 6–2, 5–7
Loss	2–3	Mar 2024	M15 Les Franqueses del Vallès, Spain	WTT	Hard	(United Kingdom) Giles Hussey	6–4, 3–6, 1–6
Win	3–3	Mar 2024	M25 Loulé, Portugal	WTT	Hard	(France) Jules Marie	6–3, 6–2
Loss	3–4	Aug 2024	M15 Monastir, Tunisia	WTT	Hard	(Ivory Coast) Eliakim Coulibaly	4–6, 3–6
Win	4–4	Nov 2024	M15 Heraklion, Greece	WTT	Hard	(Ukraine) Oleksii Krutykh	7–5, 5–7, 6–3
Win	5–4	Nov 2024	M15 Heraklion, Greece	WTT	Hard	(Ukraine) Vladyslav Orlov	2–6, 6–3, 6–0
Win	6–4	Jan 2025	M15 Manacor, Spain	WTT	Hard	(Netherlands) Ryan Nijboer	7–5, 2–6, 6–4
Loss	6–5	Jun 2025	M25 Bakio, Spain	WTT	Hard	(France) Clément Chidekh	0–6, 2–6
Win	7–5	Jul 2025	M25 Roda de Berà, Spain	WTT	Hard	(Spain) Roger Pascual Ferrà	7–6^{(15–13)}, 6–3
Loss	7–6	Oct 2025	M25 Sintra, Portugal	WTT	Hard	(Belgium) Gilles-Arnaud Bailly	6–3, 6–7^{(7–9)}, 1–6
Loss	7–7	Feb 2026	M25 Vila Real de Santo António, Portugal	WTT	Hard	(United Kingdom) Max Basing	1–6, 6–2, 4–6

=== Doubles: 7 (7 runner-ups) ===
Legend ITF WTT (0–7)	Finals by surface Hard (0–7) Clay (0–0)

Result	W–L	Date	Tournament	Tier	Surface	Partner	Opponents	Score
Loss	0–1	Nov 2021	M15 Monastir, Tunisia	WTT	Hard	(Chile) Diego Fernández Flores	(France) César Bourgois (France) Martin Breysach	4–6, 4–6
Loss	0–2	Apr 2022	M15 Monastir, Tunisia	WTT	Hard	(Italy) Giovanni Oradini	(France) Martin Breysach (France) Arthur Bouquier	3–6, 4–6
Loss	0–3	Jun 2022	M25 Martos, Spain	WTT	Hard	(Spain) Benjamín Winter López	(Australia) James Frawley (Australia) Akira Santillan	7–6^{(9–7)}, 3–6, [6–10]
Loss	0–4	Sep 2022	M25 Sintra, Portugal	WTT	Hard	(Chile) Diego Fernández Flores	(Denmark) Benjamin Hannestad (United Kingdom) Harry Wendelken	6–4, 1–6, [7–10]
Loss	0–5	Mar 2023	M25 Quinta do Lago, Portugal	WTT	Hard	(Chile) Diego Fernández Flores	(Netherlands) Mats Hermans (Netherlands) Mick Veldheer	4–6, 3–6
Loss	0–6	Jan 2024	M15 Manacor, Spain	WTT	Hard	(Switzerland) Jérôme Kym	(Netherlands) Michiel de Krom (Netherlands) Ryan Nijboer	4–6, 6–4, [9–11]
Loss	0–7	Feb 2024	M15 Villena, Spain	WTT	Hard	(Luxembourg) Alex Knaff	(Germany) Liam Gavrielides (Spain) Alejo Sánchez Quílez	2–6, 4–6
