= Sergio Martos Gornés =

Spanish tennis player (born 1994)

- Country (sports): Spain
- Residence: Barcelona, Spain
- Born: 19 October 1994 (age 31) Ciutadella de Menorca, Spain
- Height: 1.85 m (6 ft 1 in)
- Plays: Left-handed (two-handed backhand)
- Prize money: $267,641

Singles
- Career record: 0–0
- Career titles: 0 Challenger, 0 Futures
- Highest ranking: No. 726 (20 July 2015)

Doubles
- Career record: 0–8
- Career titles: 8 Challenger, 30 Futures
- Highest ranking: No. 102 (12 June 2023)
- Current ranking: No. 118 (29 September 2025)

Grand Slam doubles results
- Australian Open: 1R (2025)
- French Open: 1R (2024)
- US Open: 1R (2024)
- Last updated on: 29 September 2025.

Sergio Martos Gornés (born 19 October 1994) is a Spanish tennis player who specializes in doubles. He has a career high ATP doubles ranking of World No. 102 achieved on 12 June 2023. He also has a career high singles ranking of No. 726 achieved on 20 July 2015.

== Career ==
Martos Gornés has won 8 ATP Challenger doubles titles: 2 in 2021 at the 2021 Rafa Nadal Open and at the 2021 Vesuvio Cup, 1 in 2022 in San Marino, 1 in 2023 in Tenerife, 2 in 2024 in Bahrain and in Czechia and 2 in 2025.

He made his Grand Slam debut at the 2024 French Open as a protected ranking pair partnering Pablo Carreno Busta.

== ATP Challenger titles ==
=== Doubles : 12 titles ===
Legend
Challengers (12)

Date	Category	Tournament	Surface	Partner	Opponents	Score
Sep 2021	Challenger	Mallorca, Spain	Hard	(Poland) Karol Drzewiecki	(Brazil) Fernando Romboli (Poland) Jan Zieliński	6–4, 4–6, [10–3]
Oct 2021	Challenger	Naples, Italy	Clay	(Italy) Marco Bortolotti	(Germany) Dustin Brown (Italy) Andrea Vavassori	6–4, 3–6, [10–7]
Aug 2022	Challenger	San Marino	Clay	(Italy) Marco Bortolotti	(Serbia) Ivan Sabanov (Serbia) Matej Sabanov	6–4, 6–4
Jan 2023	Challenger	Tenerife, Spain	Hard	(Romania) Victor Vlad Cornea	(Finland) Patrik Niklas-Salminen (Netherlands) Bart Stevens	6–3, 6–4
Feb 2024	Challenger	Bahrain	Hard	(Greece) Petros Tsitsipas	(United States) Vasil Kirkov (Finland) Patrik Niklas-Salminen	3–6, 6–3, [10–8]
Jun 2024	Challenger	Prostějov, Czechia	Clay	Ivan Liutarevich	(Netherlands) Matwé Middelkoop (Austria) Philipp Oswald	6–1, 6–4
Jun 2025	Poznań, Poland	Challenger	Clay	(India) Vijay Sundar Prashanth	(Romania) Alexandru Jecan (Romania) Bogdan Pavel	2–6, 7–5, [10–8]
Sep 2025	Lisbon, Portugal	Challenger	Clay	(Spain) Pablo Llamas Ruiz	(Romania) Alexandru Jecan (Romania) Bogdan Pavel	7–6^{(7–5)}, 6–4
Apr 2026	Ostrava, Czech Republic	Challenger	Clay	(Poland) Szymon Walków	(Poland) Karol Drzewiecki (Poland) Piotr Matuszewski	6–7^{(3–7)}, 7–5, [10–8]
May 2026	Tunis, Tunisia	Challenger	Clay	(Poland) Szymon Walków	(Czech Republic) Hynek Bartoň (Czech Republic) Michael Vrbenský	1–6, 7–5, [10–8]
Jun 2026	Poznań, Poland	Challenger	Clay	(Poland) Szymon Walków	(Poland) Karol Drzewiecki (Poland) Piotr Matuszewski	6–3, 7–5
Aug 2026	Porto, Portugal	Challenger	Clay	(Poland) Szymon Walków	(Spain) Pedro Vives Marcos (Spain) Benjamín Winter López	6–4, 4–6, [10–5]
