= Rafa Nadal Open =

ATP Challenger Tour
- Event name: Rafa Nadal Open
- Location: Manacor, Spain
- Venue: Rafa Nadal Academy by Movistar
- Category: ATP Challenger Tour
- Surface: Hard
- Draw: 32S/32Q/16D
- Prize money: €43,000
- Website: Website

The Rafa Nadal Open is a professional tennis tournament played on hardcourts. It is currently part of the ATP Challenger Tour. It is held annually at the Rafa Nadal Academy in Manacor, Spain, since 2018.

== Past finals ==
=== Singles ===
| Year | Champion | Runner-up | Score |
|---|---|---|---|
| 2026 | (France) Felix Balshaw | (Spain) Iñaki Montes de la Torre | 3–6, 6–2, 6–3 |
| 2025 | (Spain) Daniel Rincón | (Austria) Jurij Rodionov | 7–6^{(7–3)}, 6–2 |
| 2024 | (Croatia) Duje Ajduković | (Italy) Matteo Gigante | 4–6, 6–3, 6–4 |
| 2023 | (Serbia) Hamad Medjedovic | (France) Harold Mayot | 6–2, 4–6, 6–2 |
| 2022 | (Italy) Luca Nardi | (Belgium) Zizou Bergs | 7–6^{(7–2)}, 3–6, 7–5 |
| 2021 | (Slovakia) Lukáš Lacko | (Japan) Yasutaka Uchiyama | 5–7, 7–6^{(10–8)}, 6–1 |
| 2020 | Not Held | | |
| 2019 | (Finland) Emil Ruusuvuori | (Italy) Matteo Viola | 6–0, 6–1 |
| 2018 | (Australia) Bernard Tomic | (Germany) Matthias Bachinger | 4–6, 6–3, 7–6^{(7–3)} |

=== Doubles ===
| Year | Champions | Runners-up | Score |
|---|---|---|---|
| 2026 | (Spain) Alberto Barroso Campos (Spain) David Vega Hernández | (Denmark) Johannes Ingildsen (Denmark) Oskar Brostrøm Poulsen | 7–5, 7–6^{(7–5)} |
| 2025 | (Spain) Alberto Barroso Campos (Colombia) Adrià Soriano Barrera | (Austria) David Pichler (Austria) Jurij Rodionov | 7–6^{(7–2)}, 3–6, [10–2] |
| 2024 | (Austria) David Pichler (Austria) Jurij Rodionov | (India) Anirudh Chandrasekar (Spain) David Vega Hernández | 1–6, 6–3, [10–7] |
| 2023 | (Israel) Daniel Cukierman (United Kingdom) Joshua Paris | (India) Sriram Balaji (India) Ramkumar Ramanathan | 6–4, 6–4 |
| 2022 | (India) Yuki Bhambri (India) Saketh Myneni | (Czech Republic) Marek Gengel (Czech Republic) Lukáš Rosol | 6–2, 6–2 |
| 2021 | (Poland) Karol Drzewiecki (Spain) Sergio Martos Gornés | (Brazil) Fernando Romboli (Poland) Jan Zieliński | 6–4, 4–6, [10–3] |
| 2020 | Not Held | | |
| 2019 | (Netherlands) Sander Arends (Netherlands) David Pel | (Poland) Karol Drzewiecki (Poland) Szymon Walków | 7–5, 6–4 |
| 2018 | (Uruguay) Ariel Behar (Spain) Enrique López Pérez | (United Kingdom) Dan Evans (Spain) Gerard Granollers | Walkover |
