= Alberto Barroso Campos =

Spanish tennis player (born 1996)

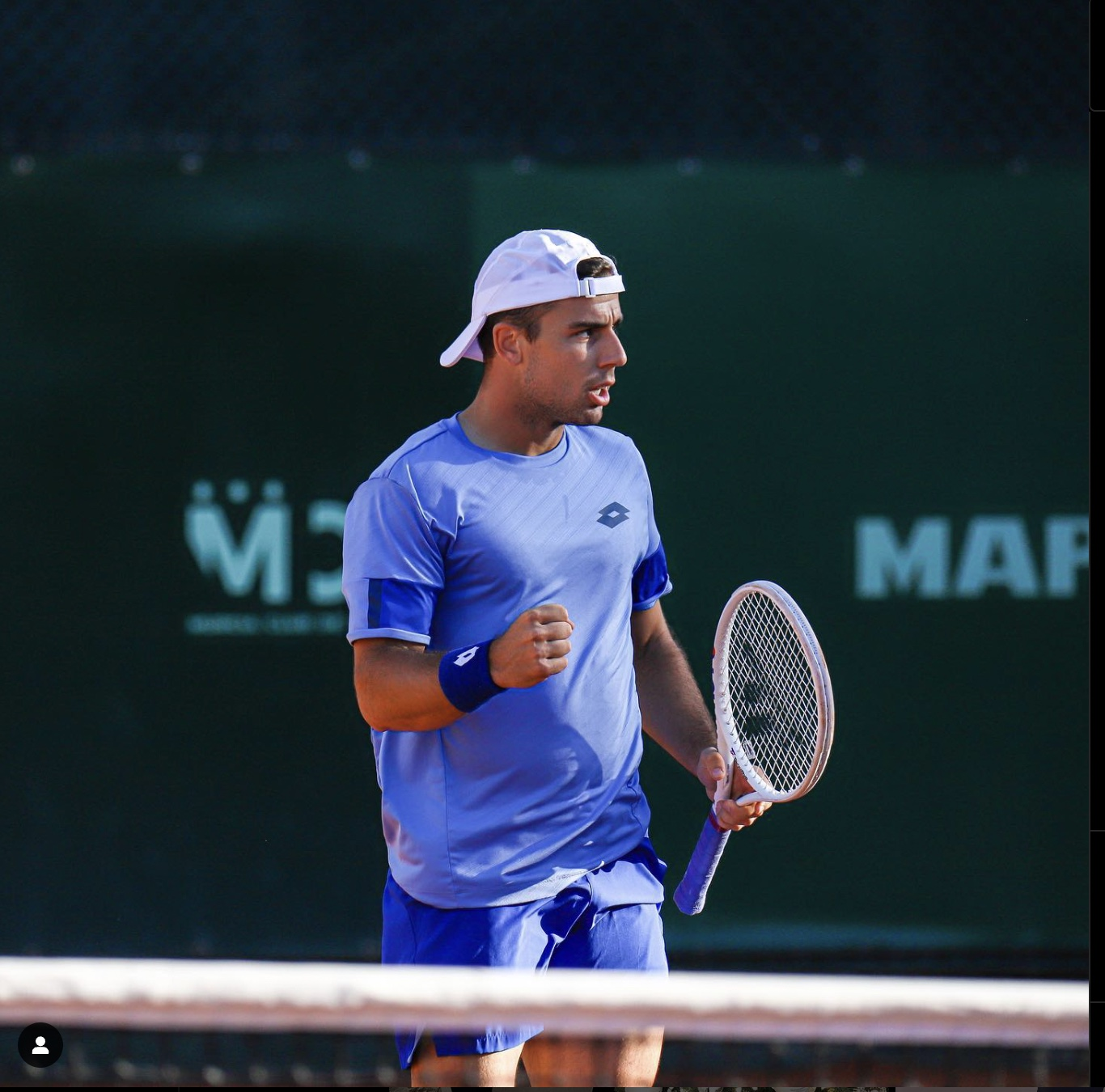
- Barroso Campos at the 2023 Murcia Open
- Country (sports): Spain
- Born: 4 June 1996 (age 30) Montijo, Spain
- Height: 1.78 m (5 ft 10 in)
- Plays: Right-handed (two-handed backhand)
- College: South Florida
- Coach: José Juárez Caro, Francisco Rubio, Pepe Juarez
- Prize money: US $171,413

Singles
- Career record: 0–0
- Career titles: 0
- Highest ranking: No. 316 (5 August 2024)
- Current ranking: No. 691 (14 September 2026)

Doubles
- Career record: 0–0
- Career titles: 4 Challenger
- Highest ranking: No. 202 (5 January 2026)
- Current ranking: No. 251 (14 September 2026)
- Last updated on: 16 September 2026.

Alberto Barroso Campos (born 4 June 1996) is a Spanish tennis player. Barroso Campos has a career high ATP singles ranking of world No. 316 achieved on 5 August 2024 and a career high doubles ranking of No. 202 achieved on 5 January 2026.

Barroso Campos played college tennis at South Florida.

== Career ==
Barroso Campos won his maiden ATP Challenger doubles title at the 2023 Copa Sevilla with Pedro Martínez.

In 2025 he won his third doubles title for the season the 2025 Athens Challenger with Michael Geerts.
