= 2026 Champaign Challenger =

- Date: November 16 – 22
- Edition: 30th
- Surface: Hard (indoor)
- Location: Champaign, Illinois, United States

Champions

Singles
- (United Kingdom) Oliver Tarvet

Doubles
- (United Kingdom) Tom Hands / (United Kingdom) Matthew Summers
- Champaign Challenger

The 2026 Champaign Challenger was a professional tennis tournament played on hardcourts. It was the 30th edition of the tournament which was part of the 2026 ATP Challenger Tour. It took place in Champaign, Illinois, United States between November 16 and 22, 2026.

== Singles main-draw entrants ==
=== Seeds ===
Country	Player	Rank^{1}	Seed
GBR	Harry Wendelken	236	1
GER	Max Hans Rehberg	241	2
GBR	Oliver Tarvet	253	3
GBR	Alastair Gray	270	4
~~JOR~~	~~Abdullah Shelbayh~~	~~305~~	~~5~~
USA	Andres Martin	364	6
FRA	Raphael Perot	384	7
USA	Jack Kennedy	385	8

- ^{1} Rankings are as of November 9, 2026.

=== Other entrants ===
The following players received wildcards into the singles main draw:

- (Hungary) Ádám Jilly
- (United States) Jordan Lee
- (Australia) Jeremy Zhang

The following player received entry into the singles main draw using a protected ranking:

- (United States) Patrick Maloney

The following players received entry from the qualifying draw:

- (United States) Kaylan Bigun
- (United States) Hunter Heck
- (United Kingdom) Giles Hussey
- (United Kingdom) Lui Maxted
- (Japan) Shunsuke Mitsui
- (Australia) Zack Viiala

The following player received entry as a lucky loser:

- (Slovenia) Sebastian Dominko

== Champions ==
=== Singles ===
- (United Kingdom) Oliver Tarvet def. (Japan) Shunsuke Mitsui 6–1, 6–3.

=== Doubles ===
- (United Kingdom) Tom Hands / (United Kingdom) Matthew Summers def. (United States) Hunter Heck / (Japan) Kenta Miyoshi 7–6^{(7–4)}, 2–6, [10–5].
