= 2026 Roehampton Challenger II =

- Date: 24–29 August
- Edition: 2nd
- Surface: Hard
- Location: Roehampton, United Kingdom

Champions

Singles
- (United Kingdom) George Loffhagen

Doubles
- (United Kingdom) Tom Hands / (United Kingdom) Matthew Summers
- Roehampton Challenger

The 2026 Lexus Roehampton Challenger II was a professional tennis tournament played on hardcourts. It was the second edition of the tournament which was part of the 2026 ATP Challenger Tour. It took place in Roehampton, United Kingdom between 24 and 29 August 2026.

== Singles main draw entrants ==
=== Seeds ===
Country	Player	Rank^{1}	Seed
GBR	Max Basing	248	1
ITA	Michele Ribecai	260	2
GBR	Alastair Gray	270	3
BRA	Matheus Pucinelli de Almeida	281	4
FRA	Matteo Martineau	286	5
GBR	Charles Broom	289	6
GBR	Johannus Monday	312	7
JPN	Jay Friend	315	8

- ^{1} Rankings as of 10 August 2026.

=== Other entrants ===
The following players received wildcards into the singles main draw:

- (United Kingdom) Billy Blaydes
- (United Kingdom) Mark Ceban
- (United Kingdom) Emile Hudd

The following player received entry into the singles main draw using a protected ranking:

- (Bulgaria) Iliyan Radulov

The following player received entry into the singles main draw through the Junior Accelerator programme:

- (Bulgaria) Ivan Ivanov

The following players received entry from the qualifying draw:

- (Italy) Fabrizio Andaloro
- (United Kingdom) Oliver Bonding
- (United Kingdom) Patrick Brady
- (Netherlands) Alec Deckers
- (Spain) Iñaki Montes de la Torre
- (Italy) Leonardo Rossi

== Champions ==
=== Singles ===
- (United Kingdom) George Loffhagen def. (United Kingdom) Charles Broom 7–5, 6–3.

=== Doubles ===
- (United Kingdom) Tom Hands / (United Kingdom) Matthew Summers def. (United Kingdom) Alastair Gray / (United States) Alex Rybakov 6–4, 6–3.
