= 2026 Roehampton Challenger II – Singles =

Singles
- 2026 Roehampton Challenger II

Final
- Champion: (United Kingdom) George Loffhagen
- Runner-up: (United Kingdom) Charles Broom
- Score: 7–5, 6–3

Events
Singles	Doubles
- Roehampton Challenger

Oliver Tarvet was the defending champion but lost in the semifinals to Charles Broom.

George Loffhagen won the title after defeating Broom 7–5, 6–3 in the final.

== Seeds ==
1. (United Kingdom) Max Basing (quarterfinals)
2. (Italy) Michele Ribecai (semifinals)
3. (United Kingdom) Alastair Gray (first round)
4. (Brazil) Matheus Pucinelli de Almeida (first round)
5. (France) Matteo Martineau (second round)
6. (United Kingdom) Charles Broom (final)
7. (United Kingdom) Johannus Monday (quarterfinals)
8. (Japan) Jay Friend (second round)

== Draw ==
Key

- Q = Qualifier
- WC = Wild card
- LL = Lucky loser
- Alt = Alternate
- ITF = ITF entry
- PR = Protected ranking
- SR = Special ranking
- SE = Special exempt
- JE = Junior exempt
- JR = Junior Accelerator Programme entrant
- CO = College Accelerator Programme entrant
- NG = Next Gen Accelerator Program entrant
- w/o = Walkover
- r = Retired
- d = Defaulted

=== Finals ===
Semifinals
6	(United Kingdom) Charles Broom	6	5	6
(United Kingdom) Oliver Tarvet	4	7	1
(United Kingdom) George Loffhagen	6	6
2	(Italy) Michele Ribecai	2	2

Final
6	(United Kingdom) Charles Broom	5	3
(United Kingdom) George Loffhagen	7	6

=== Top half ===
First round
1	(United Kingdom) M Basing	6	6
(United States) Christian Langmo	3	4
Q	(Netherlands) Alec Deckers	7^{8}	6
(Italy) Luca Potenza	6^{6}	3
(Germany) P Zahraj	3	2
Q	(United Kingdom) Patrick Brady	6	6
Q	(Italy) Leonardo Rossi	4	1
6	(United Kingdom) C Broom	6	6
4	(Brazil) M Pucinelli de Almeida	4	4
(United Kingdom) O Tarvet	6	6
Q	(United Kingdom) Oliver Bonding	6	6
(Norway) V Durasovic	3	4
Q	(Italy) Fabrizio Andaloro	2	6	3
WC	(United Kingdom) Emile Hudd	6	4	6
WC	(United Kingdom) Billy Blaydes	3	6	1
5	(France) M Martineau	6	4	6

Second round
1	(United Kingdom) M Basing	7^{7}	0	6
Q	(Netherlands) A Deckers	6^{3}	6	4
Q	(United Kingdom) P Brady	4	1
6	(United Kingdom) C Broom	6	6
(United Kingdom) O Tarvet	6	6
Q	(United Kingdom) O Bonding	4	0
WC	(United Kingdom) E Hudd	4	6	6
5	(France) M Martineau	6	3	2

Quarterfinals
1	(United Kingdom) M Basing	4	2
6	(United Kingdom) C Broom	6	6
(United Kingdom) O Tarvet	6	6
WC	(United Kingdom) E Hudd	2	4

Semifinals
6	(United Kingdom) C Broom	6	5	6
(United Kingdom) O Tarvet	4	7	1

=== Bottom half ===
First round
8	(Japan) J Friend	6	6
(Belgium) M Geerts	3	4
Q	(Spain) I Montes de la Torre	3	6	6
(Romania) A Boitan	6	3	3
JR	(Bulgaria) I Ivanov	6	3	6
(United Kingdom) R Peniston	0	6	4
(United Kingdom) G Loffhagen	6	7^{7}
3	(United Kingdom) A Gray	2	6^{4}
7	(United Kingdom) J Monday	6^{0}	6	6
PR	(Bulgaria) I Radulov	7^{7}	4	1
(United Kingdom) L Maxted	6	6
(New Zealand) Anton Shepp	3	3
(United Kingdom) A Matusevich	6	3	6
(France) C Bittoun Kouzmine	3	6	2
WC	(United Kingdom) Mark Ceban	1	2
2	(Italy) M Ribecai	6	6

Second round
8	(Japan) J Friend	6^{8}	1
Q	(Spain) I Montes de la Torre	7^{10}	6
JR	(Bulgaria) I Ivanov	3	0
(United Kingdom) G Loffhagen	6	6
7	(United Kingdom) J Monday	1	6	7^{7}
(United Kingdom) L Maxted	6	3	6^{2}
(United Kingdom) A Matusevich	7^{7}	3	3
2	(Italy) M Ribecai	6^{3}	6	6

Quarterfinals
Q	(Spain) I Montes de la Torre	3	4
(United Kingdom) G Loffhagen	6	6
7	(United Kingdom) J Monday	3	4
2	(Italy) M Ribecai	6	6

Semifinals
(United Kingdom) G Loffhagen	6	6
2	(Italy) M Ribecai	2	2
