= 2026 Champaign Challenger – Doubles =

Doubles
- 2026 Champaign Challenger

Final
- Champions: (United Kingdom) Tom Hands (United Kingdom) Matthew Summers
- Runners-up: (United States) Hunter Heck (Japan) Kenta Miyoshi
- Score: 7–6^{(7–4)}, 2–6, [10–5]

Events
Singles	Doubles
- Champaign Challenger

Patrick Harper and Shunsuke Mitsui were the defending champions but only Mitsui chose to defend his title, partnering James Hopper. They lost in the first round to Keshav Chopra and Andres Martin.

Tom Hands and Matthew Summers won the title after defeating Hunter Heck and Kenta Miyoshi 7–6^{(7–4)}, 2–6, [10–5] in the final.

== Seeds ==
1. (Antigua and Barbuda) Jody Maginley / (United States) Karl Poling (first round)
2. (United Kingdom) Tom Hands / (United Kingdom) Matthew Summers (champions)
3. (Republic of Ireland) Charles Barry / (Denmark) Johannes Ingildsen (quarterfinals)
4. (United Kingdom) James Hopper / (Japan) Shunsuke Mitsui (first round)

== Draw ==
Key

- Q = Qualifier
- WC = Wild card
- LL = Lucky loser
- Alt = Alternate
- ITF = ITF entry
- PR = Protected ranking
- SR = Special ranking
- SE = Special exempt
- JE = Junior exempt
- JR = Junior Accelerator Programme entrant
- CO = College Accelerator Programme entrant
- NG = Next Gen Accelerator Program entrant
- w/o = Walkover
- r = Retired
- d = Defaulted

First round
1	(Antigua and Barbuda) J Maginley (United States) K Poling	6^{6}	4
(France) Sasha Colleu (Australia) Zack Viiala	7^{8}	6
(United States) Hunter Heck (Japan) Kenta Miyoshi	6	6
WC	(United States) Colson Wells (Australia) Jeremy Zhang	2	3
3	(Republic of Ireland) C Barry (Denmark) J Ingildsen	3	6	[10]
(Slovenia) Sebastian Dominko (Slovenia) Filip Jeff Planinšek	6	2	[7]
(United States) Zachary Fuchs (United States) Reid Jarvis	3	6^{3}
(France) G Blancaneaux (France) Raphael Perot	6	7^{7}
(United States) L Krall (United States) Jamie Vance	4	5
(Hungary) Dávid Bakonyi (Hungary) Ádám Jilly	6	7
(United States) K Chopra (United States) A Martin	4	6	[11]
4	(United Kingdom) James Hopper (Japan) S Mitsui	6	3	[9]
(United Kingdom) A McHugh (United States) Gavin Young	2	7^{7}	[6]
(United States) Axel Nefve (United States) Jack Vance	6	6^{5}	[10]
WC	(United States) Nicholas Mekhael (United States) William Mroz	3	3
2	(United Kingdom) T Hands (United Kingdom) M Summers	6	6

Quarterfinals
(France) S Colleu (Australia) Z Viiala	7	3	[4]
(United States) H Heck (Japan) K Miyoshi	5	6	[10]
3	(Republic of Ireland) C Barry (Denmark) J Ingildsen	6^{3}	3
(France) G Blancaneaux (France) R Perot	7^{7}	6
(Hungary) D Bakonyi (Hungary) Á Jilly	6	6
(United States) K Chopra (United States) A Martin	3	4
(United States) A Nefve (United States) Jac Vance	0	3
2	(United Kingdom) T Hands (United Kingdom) M Summers	6	6

Semifinals
(United States) H Heck (Japan) K Miyoshi	7^{7}	7
(France) G Blancaneaux (France) R Perot	6^{3}	5
(Hungary) D Bakonyi (Hungary) Á Jilly	6	2	[4]
2	(United Kingdom) T Hands (United Kingdom) M Summers	2	6	[10]

Final
(United States) H Heck (Japan) K Miyoshi	6^{4}	6	[5]
2	(United Kingdom) T Hands (United Kingdom) M Summers	7^{7}	2	[10]
