= 2026 Roehampton Challenger =

- Date: 17–22 August
- Edition: 1st
- Surface: Hard
- Location: Roehampton, United Kingdom

Champions

Singles
- (United Kingdom) Oliver Tarvet

Doubles
- (United Kingdom) Tom Hands / (United Kingdom) Matthew Summers
- Roehampton Challenger

The 2026 Lexus Roehampton Challenger was a professional tennis tournament played on hardcourts. It was the first edition of the tournament which was part of the 2026 ATP Challenger Tour. It took place in Roehampton, United Kingdom between 17 and 22 August 2026.

== Singles main draw entrants ==
=== Seeds ===
Country	Player	Rank^{1}	Seed
DEN	Elmer Møller	184	1
GBR	Max Basing	250	2
GBR	Alastair Gray	264	3
BRA	Matheus Pucinelli de Almeida	277	4
FRA	Matteo Martineau	283	5
GBR	Charles Broom	287	6
GBR	Johannus Monday	315	7
BEL	Michael Geerts	339	8

- ^{1} Rankings as of 3 August 2026.

=== Other entrants ===
The following players received wildcards into the singles main draw:

- (United Kingdom) Charles Broom
- (United Kingdom) Mark Ceban
- (United Kingdom) Oliver Tarvet

The following player received entry into the singles main draw using a protected ranking:

- (Bulgaria) Iliyan Radulov

The following player received entry into the singles main draw through the Junior Accelerator programme:

- (Bulgaria) Ivan Ivanov

The following player received entry into the singles main draw as an alternate:

- (United Kingdom) Emile Hudd

The following players received entry from the qualifying draw:

- (Moldova) Radu Albot
- (United Kingdom) Billy Blaydes
- (United Kingdom) Patrick Brady
- (Netherlands) Alec Deckers
- (Hungary) Péter Makk
- (Poland) Filip Peliwo

The following player received entry as a lucky loser:

- (Spain) John Echeverría

== Champions ==
=== Singles ===
- (United Kingdom) Oliver Tarvet def. (France) Lucas Poullain 6–3, 6–2.

=== Doubles ===
- (United Kingdom) Tom Hands / (United Kingdom) Matthew Summers def. (United States) Alafia Ayeni / (France) Lucas Poullain 6–2, 7–6^{(8–6)}.
