= 2026 Wimbledon Championships – Men's singles =

Tennis championship

Gentlemen's singles
- 2026 Wimbledon Championships

Final
- Champion: (Italy) Jannik Sinner
- Runner-up: (Germany) Alexander Zverev
- Score: 6–7^{(7–9)}, 7–6^{(7–2)}, 6–3, 6–4
- Date: 12 July 2026

Details
- Draw: 128 (16Q / 8WC)
- Seeds: 32

Events
Singles	men	women		boys	girls
Doubles	men	women	mixed	boys	girls
WC Singles	men	women	quad
WC Doubles	men	women	quad
14&U Singles	boys	girls
Legends	men	women	mixed

Qualification
Singles	men	women
- Wimbledon Championships

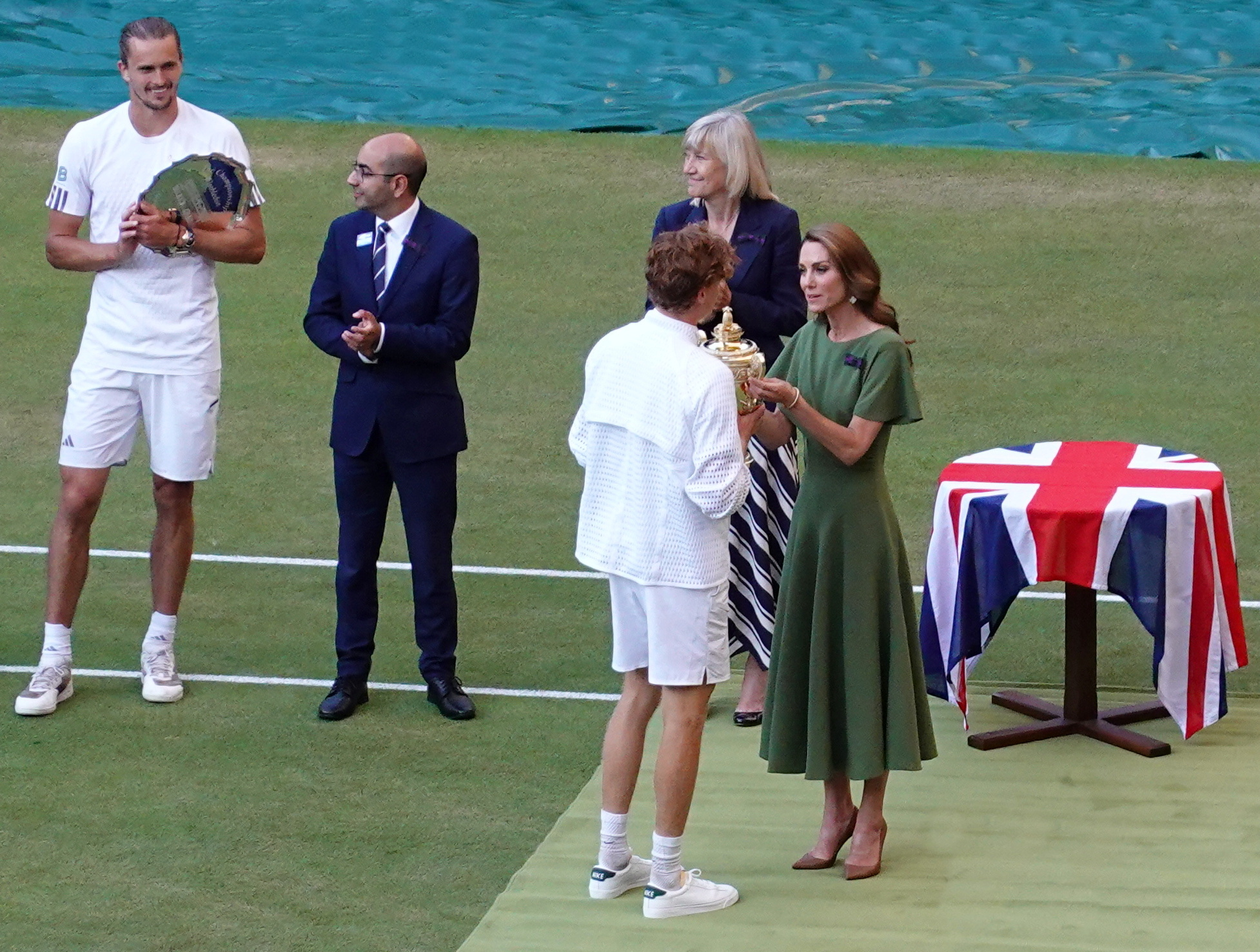
Runner-up Alexander Zverev and the winner Jannik Sinner receiving the trophy after the final

Defending champion Jannik Sinner defeated Alexander Zverev in the final, 6–7^{(7–9)}, 7–6^{(7–2)}, 6–3, 6–4 to win the gentlemen's singles tennis title at the 2026 Wimbledon Championships. It was his second Wimbledon title and fifth major title overall. Zverev was the oldest man in the Open Era to reach the finals of all four majors for the first time, at 29 years, 81 days old, and the fifth man in the Open Era to finish runner-up at all four majors (after Ivan Lendl, Roger Federer, Andy Murray, and Novak Djokovic).

With his first-round victory, Djokovic continued a 21-year-long streak of having never lost in the opening round of Wimbledon, and became the first player in the Open Era to win more than 80 opening-round matches at the majors. During the tournament, he surpassed Federer's record of Wimbledon men's singles match wins, reaching 107. The quarterfinal match between Djokovic and Félix Auger-Aliassime was the longest quarterfinal in tournament history, at 5 hours and 15 minutes long. At 39 years, 48 days old, Djokovic was the second-oldest Wimbledon semifinalist in the Open Era, only behind Ken Rosewall in 1974 (aged 39 years, 243 days).

Arthur Fery was the second wildcard to reach the Wimbledon semifinals in the Open Era, after Goran Ivanišević in 2001, the first unseeded British player at Wimbledon and the first British male wildcard at any major to do so in the Open Era. Aged 36 years, 71 days, Jan-Lennard Struff became the oldest first-time major quarterfinalist in the Open Era.

== Seeds ==
1. (Italy) Jannik Sinner (champion)
2. (Germany) Alexander Zverev (final)
3. (Canada) Félix Auger-Aliassime (quarterfinals)
4. (United States) Ben Shelton (first round)
5. (Australia) Alex de Minaur (fourth round)
6. (United States) Taylor Fritz (quarterfinals)
7. (Serbia) Novak Djokovic (semifinals)
8. Daniil Medvedev (third round)
9. (Italy) Flavio Cobolli (quarterfinals)
10. (Kazakhstan) Alexander Bublik (fourth round)
11. (Norway) Casper Ruud (first round)
12. Andrey Rublev (first round)
13. (Czech Republic) Jiří Lehečka (fourth round)
14. (Italy) Luciano Darderi (first round)
15. (Czech Republic) Jakub Menšík (second round)
16. (United States) Learner Tien (second round)
17. (United States) Frances Tiafoe (third round)
18. (Argentina) Francisco Cerúndolo (first round)
19. Karen Khachanov (third round)
20. (France) Arthur Fils (second round)
21. (United States) Tommy Paul (third round)
22. (Spain) Alejandro Davidovich Fokina (fourth round)
23. (Spain) Rafael Jódar (third round)
24. (Brazil) João Fonseca (third round)
25. (France) Arthur Rinderknech (third round)
26. (United Kingdom) Cameron Norrie (first round)
27. (France) Ugo Humbert (first round)
28. (United States) Brandon Nakashima (second round)
29. (Argentina) Tomás Martín Etcheverry (first round)
30. (Chile) Alejandro Tabilo (first round)
31. (Peru) Ignacio Buse (second round)
32. (Italy) Matteo Arnaldi (first round)

== Draw ==
Key

- Q = Qualifier
- WC = Wild card
- LL = Lucky loser
- Alt = Alternate
- ITF = ITF entry
- PR = Protected ranking
- SR = Special ranking
- SE = Special exempt
- JE = Junior exempt
- JR = Junior Accelerator Programme entrant
- CO = College Accelerator Programme entrant
- NG = Next Gen Accelerator Program entrant
- w/o = Walkover
- r = Retired
- d = Defaulted

=== Finals ===
Quarterfinals
1	(Italy) Jannik Sinner	7	7^{7}	6
(Germany) Jan-Lennard Struff	5	6^{4}	3
3	(Canada) Félix Auger-Aliassime	6^{10}	6	3	7^{7}	6^{4}
7	(Serbia) Novak Djokovic	7^{12}	3	6	6^{4}	7^{10}
9	(Italy) Flavio Cobolli	4	6^{4}	0
WC	(United Kingdom) Arthur Fery	6	7^{7}	6
6	(United States) Taylor Fritz	4	4	2
2	(Germany) Alexander Zverev	6	6	6

Semifinals
1	(Italy) Jannik Sinner	6	6	6
7	(Serbia) Novak Djokovic	4	4	4
WC	(United Kingdom) Arthur Fery	6^{0}	2	4
2	(Germany) Alexander Zverev	7^{7}	6	6

Final
1	(Italy) Jannik Sinner	6^{7}	7^{7}	6	6
2	(Germany) Alexander Zverev	7^{9}	6^{2}	3	4

=== Top half ===
==== Section 1 ====
First round
1	(Italy) J Sinner	4	6	6^{6}	6	6
(Serbia) M Kecmanović	6	3	7^{8}	2	3
(Portugal) N Borges	6	7	7
Q	(United States) T Boyer	3	5	5
(Australia) A Vukic	6^{7}	1	1
(United States) J Brooksby	7^{9}	6	6
(United States) E Nava	6^{3}	6	5	0
31	(Peru) I Buse	7^{7}	3	7	6
23	(Spain) R Jódar	6	6	7
WC	(United Kingdom) F Gill	3	3	5
(Canada) D Shapovalov	3	6^{7}	0^{r}
(Spain) P Carreño Busta	6	7^{9}	0
Q	(Japan) S Mochizuki	6	6	6
Q	(United Kingdom) M Basing	3	0	0
(United States) E Quinn	7^{9}	7	6
14	(Italy) L Darderi	6^{7}	5	2

Second round
1	(Italy) J Sinner	7^{7}	7^{7}	6
(Portugal) N Borges	6^{4}	6^{2}	4
(United States) J Brooksby	6	6	6
31	(Peru) I Buse	2	2	3
23	(Spain) R Jódar	3	6	1	6	6
(Spain) P Carreño Busta	6	3	6	3	4
Q	(Japan) S Mochizuki	6	7^{8}	7
(United States) E Quinn	2	6^{6}	5

Third round
1	(Italy) J Sinner	6	6	6
(United States) J Brooksby	4	3	4
23	(Spain) R Jódar	6	6^{5}	4	4
Q	(Japan) S Mochizuki	1	7^{7}	6	6

Fourth round
1	(Italy) J Sinner	6	7^{7}	6
Q	(Japan) S Mochizuki	3	6^{0}	3

==== Section 2 ====
First round
11	(Norway) C Ruud	4	2	6^{7}
(Poland) H Hurkacz	6	6	7^{9}
(Serbia) H Medjedovic	6	2	6	3	4
(Austria) S Ofner	1	6	4	6	6
Q	(South Korea) S-w Kwon	6	6	6
(Spain) M Landaluce	4	3	3
(France) A Müller	1	2	1
21	(United States) T Paul	6	6	6
28	(United States) B Nakashima	6	7^{7}	7
WC	(United Kingdom) J Pinnington Jones	3	6^{5}	5
(Germany) J-L Struff	6	7^{7}	4	2	7
(Argentina) S Báez	1	6^{4}	6	6	5
(Argentina) C Ugo Carabelli	6	6	2	0^{r}
(Spain) D Mérida	4	3	6	3
(Croatia) M Čilić	1	2	4
8	D Medvedev	6	6	6

Second round
(Poland) H Hurkacz	7^{10}	6	6
(Austria) S Ofner	6^{8}	4	4
Q	(South Korea) S-w Kwon	3	6^{4}	2
21	(United States) T Paul	6	7^{7}	6
28	(United States) B Nakashima	6	6^{6}	6^{5}	7^{8}	6^{7}
(Germany) J-L Struff	4	7^{8}	7^{7}	6^{6}	7^{10}
(Spain) D Mérida	6	3	5	2
8	D Medvedev	3	6	7	6

Third round
(Poland) H Hurkacz	4	7^{7}	7	6
21	(United States) T Paul	6	6^{5}	5	2
(Germany) J-L Struff	7^{7}	7^{7}	7
8	D Medvedev	6^{4}	6^{5}	5

Fourth round
(Poland) H Hurkacz	6	7^{7}	6^{2}	5	2^{r}
(Germany) J-L Struff	3	6^{5}	7^{7}	7	4

==== Section 3 ====
First round
3	(Canada) F Auger-Aliassime	6	6	6
(Kazakhstan) A Shevchenko	3	1	4
(Australia) A Walton	6	6^{3}	4	2
(Croatia) D Prižmić	4	7^{7}	6	6
(Paraguay) AD Vallejo	6	4	5	6^{2}
Q	(Colombia) N Mejía	4	6	7	7^{7}
Q	(United States) M Zheng	6^{7}	6	6^{2}	6	7^{10}
26	(United Kingdom) C Norrie	7^{9}	2	7^{7}	3	6^{4}
22	(Spain) A Davidovich Fokina	6	6	7^{7}
(Argentina) JM Cerúndolo	4	4	6^{2}
(Argentina) TA Tírante	5	3	4
(Hungary) F Marozsán	7	6	6
(France) L Van Assche	3	0^{r}
(Hungary) M Fucsovics	6	4
(Czech Republic) D Svrčina	1	4	7^{7}	3
16	(United States) L Tien	6	6	6^{4}	6

Second round
3	(Canada) F Auger-Aliassime	7^{7}	6	7
(Croatia) D Prižmić	6^{2}	3	5
Q	(Colombia) N Mejía	7^{7}	6^{8}	1	4
Q	(United States) M Zheng	6^{4}	7^{10}	6	6
22	(Spain) A Davidovich Fokina	6	6	6
(Hungary) F Marozsán	3	0	3
(Hungary) M Fucsovics	6^{6}	6	7^{7}	6
16	(United States) L Tien	7^{8}	4	6^{4}	3

Third round
3	(Canada) F Auger-Aliassime	7^{7}	6	6
Q	(United States) M Zheng	6^{1}	2	1
22	(Spain) A Davidovich Fokina	7^{7}	6	6
(Hungary) M Fucsovics	6^{3}	2	3

Fourth round
3	(Canada) F Auger-Aliassime	6^{4}	7^{8}	6	6^{2}	6
22	(Spain) A Davidovich Fokina	7^{7}	6^{6}	3	7^{7}	1

==== Section 4 ====
First round
12	A Rublev	4	7^{8}	6	3	6^{12}
Q	R Safiullin	6	6^{6}	3	6	7^{14}
(United States) A Kovacevic	3	7^{7}	4	0
(Netherlands) B van de Zandschulp	6	6^{2}	6	6
(Netherlands) J de Jong	7^{7}	3	5	6	6
(Australia) R Hijikata	6^{4}	6	7	4	3
(Spain) R Bautista Agut	6^{4}	4	3
24	(Brazil) J Fonseca	7^{7}	6	6
25	(France) A Rinderknech	7^{7}	7^{7}	4	7
Q	(United Kingdom) O Tarvet	6^{4}	6^{4}	6	5
(Argentina) M Trungelliti	6^{5}	7^{7}	6^{2}	6^{5}
(United States) M Damm	7^{7}	6^{5}	7^{7}	7^{7}
Q	(France) H Gaston	1	4	2
(Greece) S Tsitsipas	6	6	6
(China) Y Wu	4	7	4	4
7	(Serbia) N Djokovic	6	5	6	6

Second round
Q	R Safiullin	6	4	6	3	7^{10}
(Netherlands) B van de Zandschulp	0	6	3	6	6^{5}
(Netherlands) J de Jong	1	5	4
24	(Brazil) J Fonseca	6	7	6
25	(France) A Rinderknech	6	7^{7}	6
(United States) M Damm	4	6^{1}	3
(Greece) S Tsitsipas	3	4	2
7	(Serbia) N Djokovic	6	6	6

Third round
Q	R Safiullin	6	6	6
24	(Brazil) J Fonseca	3	3	3
25	(France) A Rinderknech	5	4	6	6^{4}
7	(Serbia) N Djokovic	7	6	1	7^{7}

Fourth round
Q	R Safiullin	6^{6}	3	6	3
7	(Serbia) N Djokovic	7^{8}	6	3	6

=== Bottom half ===
==== Section 5 ====
First round
5	(Australia) A de Minaur	7^{7}	6	6
(Argentina) RA Burruchaga	6^{5}	1	0
(France) A Mannarino	6	6	6
(France) T Droguet	2	4	1
LL	(Spain) P Llamas Ruiz	1	2	4
(United States) Z Svajda	6	6	6
(Poland) K Majchrzak	6	7	7
30	(Chile) A Tabilo	3	5	5
19	K Khachanov	6	5	6	6
Q	(United Kingdom) B Harris	3	7	3	3
(Germany) Y Hanfmann	6^{6}	7^{11}	6	6
(France) G Mpetshi Perricard	7^{8}	6^{9}	2	3
(Netherlands) T Griekspoor	4	6	5	4
(Australia) J Duckworth	6	4	7	6
(Argentina) M Navone	6	6^{5}	3	6^{8}
9	(Italy) F Cobolli	1	7^{7}	6	7^{10}

Second round
5	(Australia) A de Minaur	6	6	6
(France) A Mannarino	3	2	2
(United States) Z Svajda	2	6	6^{5}	6	6
(Poland) K Majchrzak	6	2	7^{7}	4	3
19	K Khachanov	6	6	6
(Germany) Y Hanfmann	3	4	4
(Australia) J Duckworth	6^{4}	6	6^{3}	1
9	(Italy) F Cobolli	7^{7}	3	7^{7}	6

Third round
5	(Australia) A de Minaur	6	5	6	6
(United States) Z Svajda	2	7	2	4
19	K Khachanov	6	6^{4}	7^{7}	2	2
9	(Italy) F Cobolli	0	7^{7}	6^{5}	6	6

Fourth round
5	(Australia) A de Minaur	5	6^{4}	3
9	(Italy) F Cobolli	7	7^{7}	6

==== Section 6 ====
First round
15	(Czech Republic) J Menšík	5	6	6	3	7^{10}
WC	(United Kingdom) T Samuel	7	3	3	6	6^{7}
Q	(Australia) D Sweeny	6^{4}	3	5
WC	(Bulgaria) G Dimitrov	7^{7}	6	7
WC	(Switzerland) S Wawrinka	7^{9}	6^{16}	6^{7}	6^{5}
(Italy) M Berrettini	6^{7}	7^{18}	7^{9}	7^{7}
(Belgium) R Collignon	5	1	3
20	(France) A Fils	7	6	6
27	(France) U Humbert	2	5	6	6	3
(Belgium) Z Bergs	6	7	4	3	6
(Japan) S Shimabukuro	6^{6}	3	7^{7}	3
Q	(Portugal) J Faria	7^{8}	6	6^{2}	6
(Bosnia and Herzegovina) D Džumhur	6	2	2	1
WC	(United Kingdom) A Fery	3	6	6	6
Q	(Finland) O Virtanen	6	3	6^{8}	6	7^{11}
4	(United States) B Shelton	4	6	7^{10}	2	6^{9}

Second round
15	(Czech Republic) J Menšík	6^{5}	6	5	3
WC	(Bulgaria) G Dimitrov	7^{7}	4	7	6
(Italy) M Berrettini	6	7	3	6
20	(France) A Fils	4	5	6	3
(Belgium) Z Bergs	7^{8}	4	6	6
Q	(Portugal) J Faria	6^{6}	6	2	3
WC	(United Kingdom) A Fery	5	7^{7}	6	6
Q	(Finland) O Virtanen	7	6^{3}	3	3

Third round
WC	(Bulgaria) G Dimitrov	6	6	3	5	6
(Italy) M Berrettini	3	4	6	7	3
(Belgium) Z Bergs	6	5	6	6^{3}	6^{5}
WC	(United Kingdom) A Fery	2	7	2	7^{7}	7^{10}

Fourth round
WC	(Bulgaria) G Dimitrov	5	6	6	4	6^{7}
WC	(United Kingdom) A Fery	7	3	4	6	7^{10}

==== Section 7 ====
First round
6	(United States) T Fritz	6	6	6
LL	(Serbia) D Lajović	3	4	3
(United States) P Kypson	3	6	6	6
Q	(United States) M McDonald	6	1	4	4
(France) B Bonzi	6	6	6^{5}	3	1^{r}
(Canada) G Diallo	1	4	7^{7}	6	3
(Italy) L Sonego	6	6	6^{2}	7^{7}
29	(Argentina) TM Etcheverry	4	4	7^{7}	6^{4}
17	(United States) F Tiafoe	7^{8}	6	4	6
(France) T Atmane	6^{6}	1	6	4
(Czech Republic) V Kopřiva	3	5	2
(United Kingdom) J Choinski	6	7	6
Q	(France) K Jacquet	6	6	7^{7}
Q	(Lithuania) V Gaubas	3	4	6^{2}
PR	(Australia) T Kokkinakis	6	3	7^{12}	3	4
10	(Kazakhstan) A Bublik	4	6	6^{10}	6	6

Second round
6	(United States) T Fritz	6	6	7
(United States) P Kypson	2	2	5
(Canada) G Diallo	6^{4}	6	6^{4}	7^{8}	2
(Italy) L Sonego	7^{7}	4	7^{7}	6^{6}	6
17	(United States) F Tiafoe	4	6	7	6
(United Kingdom) J Choinski	6	2	5	2
Q	(France) K Jacquet	3	4	6^{5}
10	(Kazakhstan) A Bublik	6	6	7^{7}

Third round
6	(United States) T Fritz	4	6	6	7^{7}
(Italy) L Sonego	6	3	4	6^{5}
17	(United States) F Tiafoe	6	6^{5}	6^{11}	6	3
10	(Kazakhstan) A Bublik	4	7^{7}	7^{13}	4	6

Fourth round
6	(United States) T Fritz	7^{7}	6	6
10	(Kazakhstan) A Bublik	6^{1}	4	4

==== Section 8 ====
First round
13	(Czech Republic) J Lehečka	6	6	6
(Australia) A Popyrin	4	2	4
(Slovakia) A Molčan	6	3	7	6
(Germany) D Altmaier	4	6	5	2
(United States) A Michelsen	6	6	2	3	2
WC	(United Kingdom) J Fearnley	3	4	6	6	6
(Spain) J Munar	6	6	6
18	(Argentina) F Cerúndolo	1	4	3
32	(Italy) M Arnaldi	6	1	6^{5}	3
(France) Q Halys	3	6	7^{7}	6
(France) C Moutet	6	4	5	4
(United States) M Giron	4	6	7	6
(France) V Royer	4	6	6	6
WC	(United Kingdom) H Wendelken	6	3	3	3
(Belgium) A Blockx	4	7^{10}	6^{5}	6^{0}
2	(Germany) A Zverev	6	6^{8}	7^{7}	7^{7}

Second round
13	(Czech Republic) J Lehečka	6	6	6
(Slovakia) A Molčan	3	2	4
WC	(United Kingdom) J Fearnley	4	6^{3}	4
(Spain) J Munar	6	7^{7}	6
(France) Q Halys	6^{5}	3	4
(United States) M Giron	7^{7}	6	6
(France) V Royer	1	3	6^{3}
2	(Germany) A Zverev	6	6	7^{7}

Third round
13	(Czech Republic) J Lehečka	6	6	4	6
(Spain) J Munar	4	4	6	4
(United States) M Giron	2	6^{4}	4
2	(Germany) A Zverev	6	7^{7}	6

Fourth round
13	(Czech Republic) J Lehečka	4	5	6	6^{6}
2	(Germany) A Zverev	6	7	3	7^{8}

== Seeded players ==
The following are the seeded players. Seedings are based on ATP rankings as of 22 June 2026. Rankings and points before are as of 29 June 2026.

^{‡}	Champion
^{†}	Runner-up

Seed	Rank	Player	Points before	Points defending	Points earned	Points after	Status
1	1	(Italy) Jannik Sinner^{‡}	13,450	2,000	2,000	13,450	Champion, defeated (Germany) Alexander Zverev [2]
2	3	(Germany) Alexander Zverev^{†}	7,190	10	1,300	8,480	Runner-up, lost to (Italy) Jannik Sinner [1]
3	4	(Canada) Félix Auger-Aliassime	4,390	50	400	4,740	Quarterfinals lost to (Serbia) Novak Djokovic [7]
4	5	(United States) Ben Shelton	4,160	400	10	3,770	First round lost to (Finland) Otto Virtanen [Q]
5	6	(Australia) Alex de Minaur	4,110	200	200	4,110	Fourth round lost to (Italy) Flavio Cobolli [9]
6	8	(United States) Taylor Fritz	3,715	800	400	3,315	Quarterfinals lost to (Germany) Alexander Zverev [2]
7	7	(Serbia) Novak Djokovic	3,760	800	800	3,760	Semifinals lost to (Italy) Jannik Sinner [1]
8	9	Daniil Medvedev	3,580	10	100	3,670	Third round lost to (Germany) Jan-Lennard Struff
9	10	(Italy) Flavio Cobolli	3,460	400	400	3,460	Quarterfinals lost to (United Kingdom) Arthur Fery [WC]
10	11	(Kazakhstan) Alexander Bublik	2,620	10	200	2,810	Fourth round lost to (United States) Taylor Fritz [6]
11	12	(Norway) Casper Ruud	2,425	0	10	2,435	First round lost to (Poland) Hubert Hurkacz
12	13	Andrey Rublev	2,420	200	10	2,230	First round lost to Roman Safiullin [Q]
13	14	(Czech Republic) Jiří Lehečka	2,360	50	200	2,510	Fourth round lost to (Germany) Alexander Zverev [2]
14	16	(Italy) Luciano Darderi	2,300	100	10	2,210	First round lost to (United States) Ethan Quinn
15	18	(Czech Republic) Jakub Menšík	2,255	100	50	2,205	Second round lost to (Bulgaria) Grigor Dimitrov [WC]
16	17	(United States) Learner Tien	2,270	50	50	2,270	Second round lost to (Hungary) Márton Fucsovics
17	19	(United States) Frances Tiafoe	2,180	50	100	2,230	Third round lost to (Kazakhstan) Alexander Bublik [10]
18	21	(Argentina) Francisco Cerúndolo	2,110	10	10	2,110	First round lost to (Spain) Jaume Munar
19	22	Karen Khachanov	2,080	400	100	1,780	Third round lost to (Italy) Flavio Cobolli [9]
20	24	(France) Arthur Fils	1,940	0	50	1,990	Second round lost to (Italy) Matteo Berrettini
21	25	(United States) Tommy Paul	1,925	50	100	1,975	Third round lost to (Poland) Hubert Hurkacz
22	23	(Spain) Alejandro Davidovich Fokina	2,060	100	200	2,160	Fourth round lost to (Canada) Félix Auger-Aliassime [3]
23	26	(Spain) Rafael Jódar	1,839	(12)^{∆}	100	1,927	Third round lost to (Japan) Shintaro Mochizuki [Q]
24	27	(Brazil) João Fonseca	1,710	100	100	1,710	Third round lost to Roman Safiullin [Q]
25	28	(France) Arthur Rinderknech	1,673	100	100	1,673	Third round lost to (Serbia) Novak Djokovic [7]
26	29	(United Kingdom) Cameron Norrie	1,595	400	10	1,205	First round lost to (United States) Michael Zheng [Q]
27	30	(France) Ugo Humbert	1,575	10	10	1,575	First round lost to (Belgium) Zizou Bergs
28	31	(United States) Brandon Nakashima	1,485	100	50	1,435	Second round lost to (Germany) Jan-Lennard Struff
29	32	(Argentina) Tomás Martín Etcheverry	1,460	10	10	1,460	First round lost to (Italy) Lorenzo Sonego
30	33	(Chile) Alejandro Tabilo	1,428	0	10	1,438	First round lost to (Poland) Kamil Majchrzak
31	34	(Peru) Ignacio Buse	1,375	(12)^{∆}	50	1,413	Second round lost to (United States) Jenson Brooksby
32	35	(Italy) Matteo Arnaldi	1,349	10	10	1,349	First round lost to (France) Quentin Halys

∆ The player didn't qualify for the tournament last year. He is defending points from his 18th best result instead.

=== Withdrawn seeded players ===
The following players would have been seeded, but withdrew before the tournament began.

Rank	Player	Points before	Points defending	Points after	Withdrawal reason
2	(Spain) Carlos Alcaraz	9,460	1,300	8,160	Right wrist injury
15	(Italy) Lorenzo Musetti	2,325	10	2,315	Left thigh injury
20	(Monaco) Valentin Vacherot	2,138	(0)^{∆}	2,138	Left foot injury

∆ The player didn't qualify for the tournament last year. He is defending points from his 18th best result instead.

== Other entry information ==
=== Wildcards ===
- (Bulgaria) Grigor Dimitrov
- (United Kingdom) Jacob Fearnley
- (United Kingdom) Arthur Fery
- (United Kingdom) Felix Gill
- (United Kingdom) Jack Pinnington Jones
- (United Kingdom) Toby Samuel
- (Switzerland) Stan Wawrinka
- (United Kingdom) Harry Wendelken

=== Protected ranking ===
- (Australia) Thanasi Kokkinakis (84)

=== Qualifiers ===
- (United Kingdom) Max Basing
- (United States) Tristan Boyer
- (Portugal) Jaime Faria
- (France) Hugo Gaston
- (Lithuania) Vilius Gaubas
- (United Kingdom) Billy Harris
- (France) Kyrian Jacquet
- (South Korea) Kwon Soon-woo
- (United States) Mackenzie McDonald
- (Colombia) Nicolás Mejía
- (Japan) Shintaro Mochizuki
- Roman Safiullin
- (Australia) Dane Sweeny
- (United Kingdom) Oliver Tarvet
- (Finland) Otto Virtanen
- (United States) Michael Zheng

=== Lucky losers ===
- (Serbia) Dušan Lajović
- (Spain) Pablo Llamas Ruiz

=== Withdrawals ===
- ‡ (Spain) Carlos Alcaraz (2) → replaced by (United Kingdom) Jan Choinski (104)
- ‡ (France) Arthur Cazaux (76) → replaced by (Japan) Sho Shimabukuro (105)
- ‡ (Monaco) Valentin Vacherot (18) → replaced by (Slovakia) Alex Molčan (106)
- ‡ (Italy) Lorenzo Musetti (11) → replaced by (Italy) Matteo Berrettini (107)
- ‡ (United States) Sebastian Korda (46) → replaced by (France) Alexandre Müller (108)
- ‡ (Czech Republic) Tomáš Macháč (40) → replaced by (Netherlands) Jesper de Jong (109)
- ‡ (Denmark) Holger Rune (43) → replaced by (France) Titouan Droguet (110)
- ‡ (United States) Reilly Opelka (75) → replaced by (Czech Republic) Dalibor Svrčina (111)
- ‡ (United States) Eliot Spizzirri (92) → replaced by (United States) Martin Damm (112)
- § (Italy) Mattia Bellucci (66) → (Spain) Pablo Llamas Ruiz (LL)
- § (United Kingdom) Jack Draper (68) → (Serbia) Dušan Lajović (LL)

‡ – withdrew from entry list
§ – withdrew from main draw

Preceded by 2026 French Open – Men's singles	Grand Slam men's singles	Succeeded by 2026 US Open – Men's singles
