= 2026 Roehampton Challenger II – Doubles =

Doubles
- 2026 Roehampton Challenger II

Final
- Champions: (United Kingdom) Tom Hands (United Kingdom) Matthew Summers
- Runners-up: (United Kingdom) Alastair Gray (United States) Alex Rybakov
- Score: 6–4, 6–3

Events
Singles	Doubles
- Roehampton Challenger

Tom Hands and Matthew Summers were the defending champions and successfully defended their title after defeating Alastair Gray and Alex Rybakov 6–4, 6–3 in the final.

== Seeds ==
1. (United Kingdom) Finn Bass / (United Kingdom) Scott Duncan (first round)
2. (Republic of Ireland) Charles Barry / (Belgium) Michael Geerts (semifinals)
3. (United Kingdom) Mark Whitehouse / (Germany) Patrick Zahraj (first round)
4. (United Kingdom) Lui Maxted / (United Kingdom) Johannus Monday (quarterfinals, withdrew)

== Draw ==
Key

- Q = Qualifier
- WC = Wild card
- LL = Lucky loser
- Alt = Alternate
- ITF = ITF entry
- PR = Protected ranking
- SR = Special ranking
- SE = Special exempt
- JE = Junior exempt
- JR = Junior Accelerator Programme entrant
- CO = College Accelerator Programme entrant
- NG = Next Gen Accelerator Program entrant
- w/o = Walkover
- r = Retired
- d = Defaulted

First round
1	(United Kingdom) F Bass (United Kingdom) S Duncan	4	2
(United Kingdom) T Hands (United Kingdom) M Summers	6	6
WC	(United Kingdom) Billy Blaydes (United Kingdom) Viktor Frydrych	4	6	[10]
(Norway) V Durasovic (Italy) Luca Potenza	6	1	[8]
4	(United Kingdom) L Maxted (United Kingdom) J Monday	6^{2}	7^{7}	[10]
(France) C Bittoun Kouzmine (United Kingdom) Marcus Walters	7^{7}	6^{3}	[6]
(Italy) Fabrizio Andaloro (Italy) M Ribecai	7^{10}	6
(United States) Jack Vance (United States) Jamie Vance	6^{8}	3
(Spain) John Echeverría (Spain) I Montes de la Torre	4	2
(United Kingdom) A Gray (United States) A Rybakov	6	6
(Australia) Je Delaney (United Kingdom) Emile Hudd	5	6	[10]
3	(United Kingdom) M Whitehouse (Germany) P Zahraj	7	4	[7]
WC	(United Kingdom) Conor Brady (United Kingdom) Matthew Howse	6^{4}	6	[10]
(United States) Zachary Fuchs (Venezuela) B Pérez	7^{7}	4	[12]
(Republic of Ireland) C Gannon (United Kingdom) J MacKinlay	6	4	[5]
2	(Republic of Ireland) C Barry (Belgium) M Geerts	3	6	[10]

Quarterfinals
(United Kingdom) T Hands (United Kingdom) M Summers	3	6	[10]
WC	(United Kingdom) B Blaydes (United Kingdom) V Frydrych	6	4	[4]
4	(United Kingdom) L Maxted (United Kingdom) J Monday
(Italy) F Andaloro (Italy) M Ribecai	w/o
(United Kingdom) A Gray (United States) A Rybakov	3	6	[10]
(Australia) Je Delaney (United Kingdom) E Hudd	6	2	[7]
(United States) Z Fuchs (Venezuela) B Pérez	2	6	[6]
2	(Republic of Ireland) C Barry (Belgium) M Geerts	6	3	[10]

Semifinals
(United Kingdom) T Hands (United Kingdom) M Summers	6	6
(Italy) F Andaloro (Italy) M Ribecai	3	1
(United Kingdom) A Gray (United States) A Rybakov	7^{7}	4	[10]
2	(Republic of Ireland) C Barry (Belgium) M Geerts	6^{5}	6	[5]

Final
(United Kingdom) T Hands (United Kingdom) M Summers	6	6
(United Kingdom) A Gray (United States) A Rybakov	4	3
