= 2026 Champaign Challenger – Singles =

Singles
- 2026 Champaign Challenger

Final
- Champion: (United Kingdom) Oliver Tarvet
- Runner-up: (Japan) Shunsuke Mitsui
- Score: 6–1, 6–3

Events
Singles	Doubles
- Champaign Challenger

Stefan Kozlov was the defending champion but chose not to defend his title.

Oliver Tarvet won the title after defeating Shunsuke Mitsui 6–1, 6–3 in the final.

== Seeds ==
1. (United Kingdom) Harry Wendelken (quarterfinals)
2. (Germany) Max Hans Rehberg (first round)
3. (United Kingdom) Oliver Tarvet (champion)
4. (United Kingdom) Alastair Gray (second round)
5. (Jordan) Abdullah Shelbayh (withdrew)
6. (United States) Andres Martin (second round)
7. (France) Raphael Perot (second round)
8. (United States) Jack Kennedy (second round)

== Draw ==
Key

- Q = Qualifier
- WC = Wild card
- LL = Lucky loser
- Alt = Alternate
- ITF = ITF entry
- PR = Protected ranking
- SR = Special ranking
- SE = Special exempt
- JE = Junior exempt
- JR = Junior Accelerator Programme entrant
- CO = College Accelerator Programme entrant
- NG = Next Gen Accelerator Program entrant
- w/o = Walkover
- r = Retired
- d = Defaulted

=== Finals ===
Semifinals
WC	(United States) Jordan Lee	2	6^{4}
3	(United Kingdom) Oliver Tarvet	6	7^{7}
(Slovenia) Bor Artnak	4	1
Q	(Japan) Shunsuke Mitsui	6	6

Final
3	(United Kingdom) Oliver Tarvet	6	6
Q	(Japan) Shunsuke Mitsui	1	3

=== Top half ===
First round
1	(United Kingdom) H Wendelken	6	6
Q	(United Kingdom) G Hussey	3	3
Q	(Australia) Zack Viiala	7	1	6^{4}
(France) G Blancaneaux	5	6	7^{7}
Q	(United States) Hunter Heck	1	3
WC	(United States) J Lee	6	6
(Slovenia) Filip Jeff Planinšek	2	3
6	(United States) A Martin	6	6
3	(United Kingdom) O Tarvet	6	6
(United States) K Poling	3	3
(United States) O Baris	6	7^{7}
(Japan) Kenta Miyoshi	3	6^{5}
WC	(Hungary) Ádám Jilly	3	4
(United States) Spencer Johnson	6	6
(Israel) Amit Vales	3	0
7	(France) Raphael Perot	6	6

Second round
1	(United Kingdom) H Wendelken	0	7^{7}	7^{7}
(France) G Blancaneaux	6	6^{4}	6^{5}
WC	(United States) J Lee	6	4	6
6	(United States) A Martin	3	6	4
3	(United Kingdom) O Tarvet	3	7^{7}	6
(United States) O Baris	6	6^{5}	4
(United States) S Johnson	6	7
7	(France) R Perot	3	5

Quarterfinals
1	(United Kingdom) H Wendelken	6^{3}	6^{4}
WC	(United States) J Lee	7^{7}	7^{7}
3	(United Kingdom) O Tarvet	6	6
(United States) S Johnson	2	1

Semifinals
WC	(United States) J Lee	2	6^{4}
3	(United Kingdom) O Tarvet	6	7^{7}

=== Bottom half ===
First round
LL	(Slovenia) Sebastian Dominko	6	6
Q	(United States) K Bigun	3	4
(United States) Gavin Young	6	6
(United States) A Fenty	3	4
(Germany) Luca Wiedenmann	1	3
(Slovenia) B Artnak	6	6
PR	(United States) Patrick Maloney	1	4
4	(United Kingdom) A Gray	6	6
8	(United States) J Kennedy	7	6
(United States) M Krueger	5	3
(United States) Q Vandecasteele	6	4	2
Q	(United Kingdom) L Maxted	3	6	6
(United Kingdom) A McHugh	6	6
WC	(Australia) Jeremy Zhang	2	1
Q	(Japan) S Mitsui	7	6
2	(Germany) MH Rehberg	5	3

Second round
LL	(Slovenia) S Dominko	7^{7}	3	1
(United States) G Young	6^{3}	6	6
(Slovenia) B Artnak	6	3	6
4	(United Kingdom) A Gray	2	6	3
8	(United States) J Kennedy	7^{7}	1	2
Q	(United Kingdom) L Maxted	6^{5}	6	6
(United Kingdom) A McHugh	3	3
Q	(Japan) S Mitsui	6	6

Quarterfinals
(United States) G Young	5	2
(Slovenia) B Artnak	7	6
Q	(United Kingdom) L Maxted	4	7^{7}	4
Q	(Japan) S Mitsui	6	6^{5}	6

Semifinals
(Slovenia) B Artnak	4	1
Q	(Japan) S Mitsui	6	6
