= 2026 Roehampton Challenger – Doubles =

Doubles
- 2026 Roehampton Challenger

Final
- Champions: (United Kingdom) Tom Hands (United Kingdom) Matthew Summers
- Runners-up: (United States) Alafia Ayeni (France) Lucas Poullain
- Score: 6–2, 7–6^{(8–6)}

Events
Singles	Doubles
- Roehampton Challenger

This was the first edition of the tournament.

Tom Hands and Matthew Summers won the title after defeating Alafia Ayeni and Lucas Poullain 6–2, 7–6^{(8–6)} in the final.

== Seeds ==
1. (United Kingdom) Finn Bass / (United Kingdom) Scott Duncan (quarterfinals)
2. (France) Constantin Bittoun Kouzmine / (Japan) Yuta Shimizu (first round, withdrew)
3. (Republic of Ireland) Charles Barry / (United Kingdom) Charles Broom (semifinals)
4. (Belgium) Michael Geerts / (France) Matteo Martineau (semifinals)

== Draw ==
Key

- Q = Qualifier
- WC = Wild card
- LL = Lucky loser
- Alt = Alternate
- ITF = ITF entry
- PR = Protected ranking
- SR = Special ranking
- SE = Special exempt
- JE = Junior exempt
- JR = Junior Accelerator Programme entrant
- CO = College Accelerator Programme entrant
- NG = Next Gen Accelerator Program entrant
- w/o = Walkover
- r = Retired
- d = Defaulted

First round
1	(United Kingdom) F Bass (United Kingdom) S Duncan	6	6
WC	(United Kingdom) Viktor Frydrych (United Kingdom) Zach Stephens	2	3
WC	(United Kingdom) Oliver Bonding (United Kingdom) L Maxted
(United Kingdom) T Hands (United Kingdom) M Summers	w/o
4	(Belgium) M Geerts (France) M Martineau	7	5	[10]
(Australia) Je Delaney (United Kingdom) Emile Hudd	5	7	[8]
(United States) Jack Vance (United States) Jamie Vance	4	1
(Spain) John Echeverría (United Kingdom) A Matusevich	6	6
(India) M Dhamne (Italy) Giulio Perego	0	6^{3}
(United Kingdom) A Gray (United States) A Rybakov	6	7^{7}
(Republic of Ireland) C Gannon (United Kingdom) J MacKinlay	7^{7}	3	[10]
3	(Republic of Ireland) C Barry (United Kingdom) C Broom	6^{5}	6	[12]
(United States) A Ayeni (France) L Poullain	6	6
(Romania) A Boitan (Norway) V Durasovic	1	2
(United Kingdom) Liam Hignett (United Kingdom) Marcus Walters	w/o
2	(France) C Bittoun Kouzmine (Japan) Y Shimizu

Quarterfinals
1	(United Kingdom) F Bass (United Kingdom) S Duncan	6	3	[4]
(United Kingdom) T Hands (United Kingdom) M Summers	4	6	[10]
4	(Belgium) M Geerts (France) M Martineau	6	6
(Spain) J Echeverría (United Kingdom) A Matusevich	2	4
(United Kingdom) A Gray (United States) A Rybakov	5	7^{7}	[6]
3	(Republic of Ireland) C Barry (United Kingdom) C Broom	7	6^{3}	[10]
(United States) A Ayeni (France) L Poullain	6	6
(United Kingdom) L Hignett (United Kingdom) M Walters	3	4

Semifinals
(United Kingdom) T Hands (United Kingdom) M Summers	6	7
4	(Belgium) M Geerts (France) M Martineau	3	5
3	(Republic of Ireland) C Barry (United Kingdom) C Broom	5	2
(United States) A Ayeni (France) L Poullain	7	6

Final
(United Kingdom) T Hands (United Kingdom) M Summers	6	7^{8}
(United States) A Ayeni (France) L Poullain	2	6^{6}
