= 2026 Roehampton Challenger – Singles =

Singles
- 2026 Roehampton Challenger

Final
- Champion: (United Kingdom) Oliver Tarvet
- Runner-up: (France) Lucas Poullain
- Score: 6–3, 6–2

Events
Singles	Doubles
- Roehampton Challenger

This was the first edition of the tournament.

Oliver Tarvet won the title after defeating Lucas Poullain 6–3, 6–2 in the final.

== Seeds ==
1. (Denmark) Elmer Møller (second round)
2. (United Kingdom) Max Basing (first round)
3. (United Kingdom) Alastair Gray (second round)
4. (Brazil) Matheus Pucinelli de Almeida (second round)
5. (France) Matteo Martineau (first round)
6. (United Kingdom) Charles Broom (quarterfinals)
7. (United Kingdom) Johannus Monday (first round)
8. (Belgium) Michael Geerts (quarterfinals)

== Draw ==
Key

- Q = Qualifier
- WC = Wild card
- LL = Lucky loser
- Alt = Alternate
- ITF = ITF entry
- PR = Protected ranking
- SR = Special ranking
- SE = Special exempt
- JE = Junior exempt
- JR = Junior Accelerator Programme entrant
- CO = College Accelerator Programme entrant
- NG = Next Gen Accelerator Program entrant
- w/o = Walkover
- r = Retired
- d = Defaulted

=== Finals ===
Semifinals
(United Kingdom) Anton Matusevich	2	6	2
WC	(United Kingdom) Oliver Tarvet	6	2	6
(United Kingdom) Lui Maxted	3	2
(France) Lucas Poullain	6	6

Final
WC	(United Kingdom) Oliver Tarvet	6	6
(France) Lucas Poullain	3	2

=== Top half ===
First round
1	(Denmark) E Møller	6	6
JR	(Bulgaria) I Ivanov	4	2
(Japan) Y Shimizu	4	5
(United Kingdom) A Matusevich	6	7
(New Zealand) Anton Shepp	1	3
WC	(United Kingdom) Mark Ceban	6	6
PR	(Bulgaria) I Radulov	6	3	7
7	(United Kingdom) J Monday	4	6	5
4	(Brazil) M Pucinelli de Almeida	6	6
Q	(Hungary) Péter Makk	3	1
LL	(Spain) John Echeverría	3	4
WC	(United Kingdom) O Tarvet	6	6
(Egypt) Fares Zakaria	1	6^{0}
(United States) A Rybakov	6	7^{7}
Q	(Poland) F Peliwo	1	1
6/WC	(United Kingdom) C Broom	6	6

Second round
1	(Denmark) E Møller	1	3
(United Kingdom) A Matusevich	6	6
WC	(United Kingdom) M Ceban	6	7^{7}
PR	(Bulgaria) I Radulov	1	6^{5}
4	(Brazil) M Pucinelli de Almeida	2	7	4
WC	(United Kingdom) O Tarvet	6	5	6
(United States) A Rybakov	5	3
6/WC	(United Kingdom) C Broom	7	6

Quarterfinals
(United Kingdom) A Matusevich	6	6
WC	(United Kingdom) M Ceban	4	3
WC	(United Kingdom) O Tarvet	6	5	6
6/WC	(United Kingdom) C Broom	4	7	1

Semifinals
(United Kingdom) A Matusevich	2	6	2
WC	(United Kingdom) O Tarvet	6	2	6

=== Bottom half ===
First round
5	(France) M Martineau	5	6^{1}
(United Kingdom) L Maxted	7	7^{7}
Q	(Netherlands) Alec Deckers	4	6^{4}
Q	(United Kingdom) Patrick Brady	6	7^{7}
(United States) Christian Langmo	3	6^{2}
(Romania) A Boitan	6	7^{7}
Alt	(United Kingdom) Emile Hudd	6	3	2
3	(United Kingdom) A Gray	4	6	6
8	(Belgium) M Geerts	6	7^{8}
Q	(United Kingdom) Billy Blaydes	3	6^{6}
Q	(Moldova) R Albot	6	6
(France) C Bittoun Kouzmine	2	2
(Norway) V Durasovic	6	4	6
(India) M Dhamne	4	6	3
(France) L Poullain	6	7^{7}
2	(United Kingdom) M Basing	0	6^{5}

Second round
(United Kingdom) L Maxted	6	4	7
Q	(United Kingdom) P Brady	4	6	5
(Romania) A Boitan	4	6	6
3	(United Kingdom) A Gray	6	3	2
8	(Belgium) M Geerts	4	6	6
Q	(Moldova) R Albot	6	4	4
(Norway) V Durasovic	4	2
(France) L Poullain	6	6

Quarterfinals
(United Kingdom) L Maxted	7	6
(Romania) A Boitan	5	4
8	(Belgium) M Geerts	7^{7}	3	5
(France) L Poullain	6^{5}	6	7

Semifinals
(United Kingdom) L Maxted	3	2
(France) L Poullain	6	6
