= Lucas Poullain =

French tennis player (born 1995)

- Country (sports): France
- Born: 5 December 1995 (age 30) Saint-Nazaire, France
- Height: 1.75 m (5 ft 9 in)
- Plays: Right-handed (two-handed backhand)
- College: Florida State
- Prize money: US $223,755

Singles
- Career record: 0–0 (at ATP Tour level, Grand Slam level, and in Davis Cup)
- Career titles: 1 ATP Challenger, 9 ITF
- Highest ranking: No. 244 (26 February 2024)
- Current ranking: No. 369 (10 August 2026)

Doubles
- Career record: 0–0 (at ATP Tour level, Grand Slam level, and in Davis Cup)
- Career titles: 3 ITF
- Highest ranking: No. 667 (17 May 2021)
- Current ranking: No. 973 (10 August 2026)
- Last updated on: 10 August 2026.

Lucas Poullain (born 5 December 1995) is a French tennis player. He has a career high ATP singles ranking of No. 244 achieved on 26 February 2024 and a career high ATP doubles ranking of No. 667 achieved on 17 May 2021.

Poullain played college tennis at Florida State.

== Career ==
=== 2026: Maiden Challenger title ===
In August, Poullain won his maiden Challenger title at the ENKA Open after defeating seventh seed Ilia Simakin in the final. Later that month, Poullain reached his second Challenger final at the Roehampton Challenger, losing to Oliver Tarvet in the final. He also reached his first Challenger doubles final at the same tournament, pairing with Alafia Ayeni.

== ATP Challenger Tour finals ==
=== Singles: 2 (1 title, 1 runner-up) ===
Legend ATP Challenger Tour (1–1)	Finals by surface Hard (1–1)

Result	W–L	Date	Tournament	Tier	Surface	Opponent	Score
Win	1–0	Aug 2026	ENKA Open, Turkey	Challenger	Hard	Ilia Simakin	5–7, 6–2, 6–3
Loss	1–1	Aug 2026	Roehampton Challenger, United Kingdom	Challenger	Hard	(United Kingdom) Oliver Tarvet	3–6, 2–6

=== Doubles: 1 (1 runner-up) ===
Legend ATP Challenger Tour (0–1)	Finals by surface Hard (0–1)

Result	W–L	Date	Tournament	Surface	Partner	Opponents	Score
Loss	0-1	Aug 2026	Roehampton, United Kingdom	Hard	(United States) Alafia Ayeni	(United Kingdom) Tom Hands (United Kingdom) Matthew Summers	2–6, 6–7^{(6–8)}
