= Roehampton Challenger =

- 2026 Roehampton Challenger

ATP Challenger Tour
- Location: Roehampton, United Kingdom
- Category: ATP Challenger Tour
- Surface: Hard

The Lexus Roehampton Challenger is a professional tennis tournament played on hardcourts. It is currently part of the ATP Challenger Tour. It was first held in Roehampton, United Kingdom in 2026 in two editions.

== Past finals ==
=== Singles ===
Year	Champion	Runner-up	Score
2026 (1)	(United Kingdom) Oliver Tarvet	(France) Lucas Poullain	6–3, 6–2
2026 (2)	(United Kingdom) George Loffhagen	(United Kingdom) Charles Broom	7–5, 6–3

=== Doubles ===
Year	Champions	Runners-up	Score
2026 (1)	(United Kingdom) Tom Hands (United Kingdom) Matthew Summers	(United States) Alafia Ayeni (France) Lucas Poullain	6–2, 7–6^{(8–6)}
2026 (2)	(United Kingdom) Tom Hands (United Kingdom) Matthew Summers	(United Kingdom) Alastair Gray (United States) Alex Rybakov	6–4, 6–3
