= George Loffhagen =

British tennis player (born 2001)

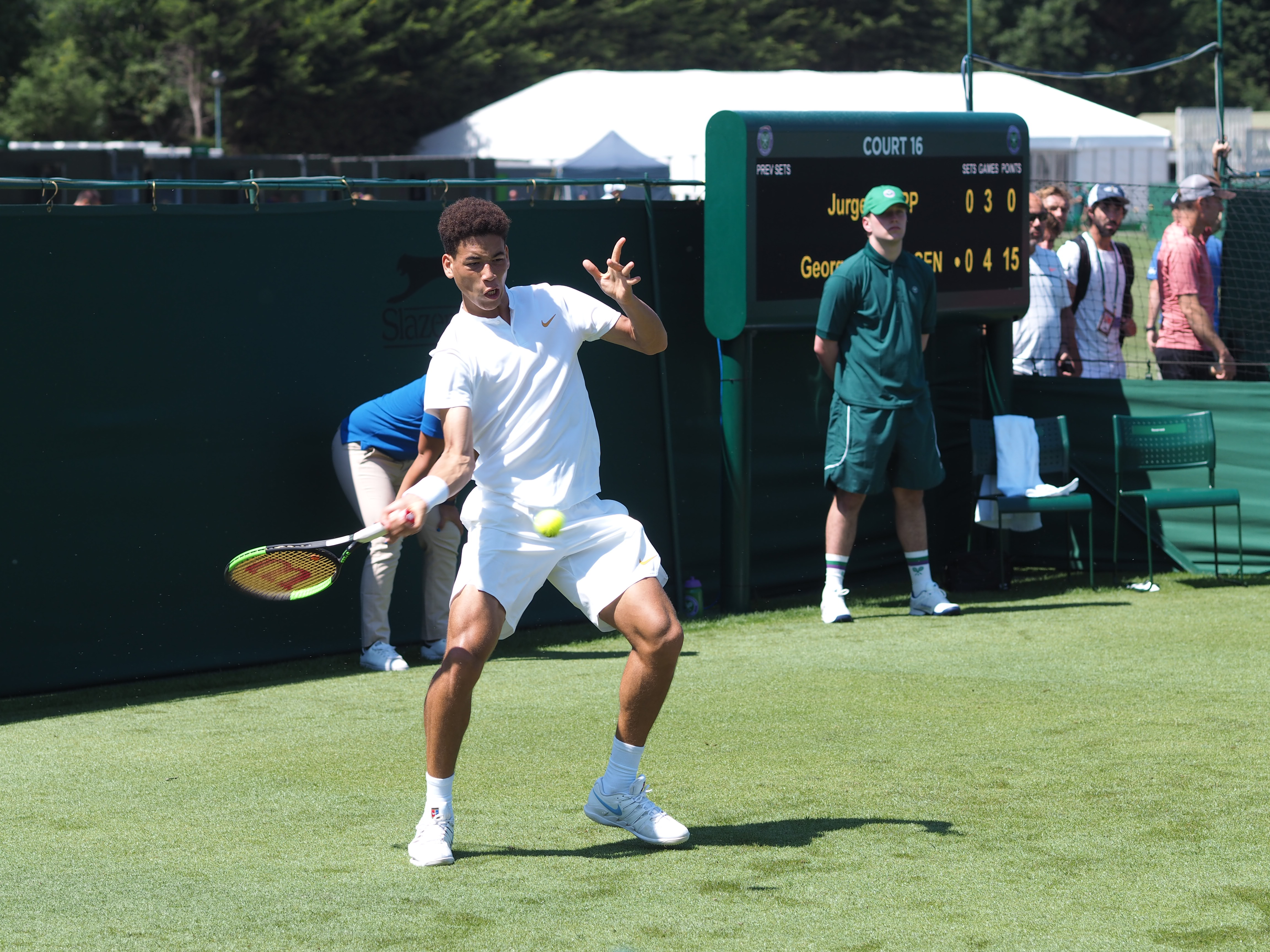
- Loffhagen at the 2018 Wimbledon Championships
- Country (sports): (United Kingdom) Great Britain
- Born: 19 April 2001 (age 25) London, United Kingdom
- Height: 1.88 m (6 ft 2 in)
- Plays: Right-handed (two-handed backhand)
- Prize money: US $444,724

Singles
- Career record: 0–4
- Career titles: 2 ATP Challenger
- Highest ranking: No. 200 (27 October 2025)
- Current ranking: No. 486 (9 November 2026)

Grand Slam singles results
- Australian Open: Q3 (2026)
- Wimbledon: 1R (2023, 2025)
- US Open: Q1 (2025)

Doubles
- Career record: 0–0
- Career titles: 0
- Highest ranking: No. 1,144 (23 September 2019)
- Last updated on: 9 November 2026.

George Loffhagen (born 19 April 2001) is a British professional tennis player. He has a career-high ATP singles ranking of world No. 200 achieved on 27 October 2025. He has won two ATP Challenger and six ITF singles titles.

== Early life ==
From Ealing, West London, he attended St Benedict’s School. From the age of eight he was coached by Jo Durie’s former coach Alan Jones and later his son Ryan Jones, and joined a tennis academy based at Chiswick and Northwood in Middlesex, run by David Felgate, where he was a regular practice partner of Jack Draper.

== Career ==
Loffhagen competed in the boys' singles events in 2017 at Wimbledon and the US Open, reaching the third round in both. He also competed in the boys' doubles at those tournaments, partnering Jack Draper. He made his senior professional debut in an F6 Futures in Britain in September 2017. He became the first male tennis player born in 2001 to reach a professional final in May 2018, at an F1 Futures event in Uganda.

Loffhagen stepped away from tennis for a time saying that he "wasn’t enjoying it at that time" and "wanted to do something else. I worked in a pub, studied a bit, went to university… and then I played a couple of tournaments and enjoyed it again. I didn’t want to have regrets—so I decided to start again".

In April 2023, he won the ITF M25 Mysuru Open in India, defeating Australian Blake Ellis in the final. In May 2023, he won an M25 tournament held in Nottingham, for his second career title at that level in as many months. In June 2023 he secured his first win at the ATP Challenger level when he defeated top-150 ranked Finn Otto Virtanen at the 2023 Nottingham Open. He backed that win up with a victory over higher-ranked Shang Juncheng in the next round to make the quarterfinals in Nottingham. At No. 176 in the world, Juncheng started the match 238 places higher than Loffhagen.

He was awarded a wildcard for his Grand Slam tournament main-draw debut at the 2023 Wimbledon Championships, where he lost out to Holger Rune in straight sets in the first round. At the 2025 Wimbledon Championships, he was again given a wildcard into the main-draw where but lost to Pedro Martinez in four sets in the first round.

Loffhagen won his first ATP Challenger title at El Espinar in Spain in July 2025, defeating Nicolás Álvarez Varona in the final.

Having entered qualifying for the 2026 Australian Open, he won in the first round against Germany's Justin Engel. He lost in the final round of qualifying to American Nishesh Basavareddy.

Loffhagen won his second ATP Challenger singles title at the 2026 Roehampton Challenger II, defeating fellow British player Charles Broom in the final.

== Personal life ==
Loffhagen is the son of legal professionals. He has sisters named Grace and Emma. As a sixteen-year-old, he was able to practice with Rafael Nadal after a personal recommendation by Tim Henman.

== ATP Challenger and ITF Futures finals ==
=== Singles: 17 (10–7) ===
Legend ATP Challengers (2–0) ITF Futures/World Tennis Tour (8–7)	Finals by surface Hard (10-4) Clay (0-2) Grass (0–1) Carpet (0–0)

Result	W–L	Date	Tournament	Tier	Surface	Opponent	Score
Loss	0–1	May 2018	Uganda F1, Kampala	Futures	Clay	(Russia) Ivan Nedelko	4–6, 4–6
Loss	0–2	Nov 2018	Greece F6, Heraklion	Futures	Hard	(France) Baptiste Crepatte	5–7, 4–6
Loss	0–3	Mar 2021	M25 Poitiers, France	World Tour	Hard	(France) Lucas Poullain	2–6, 6–2, 2–6
Loss	0–4	Jan 2023	M25 Loughborough, United Kingdom	World Tour	Hard (i)	(France) Clément Chidekh	4–6, 2–6
Win	1–4	Apr 2023	M25 Mysuru, India	World Tour	Hard	(Australia) Blake Ellis	7–6^{(7–2)}, 6–2
Win	2–4	May 2023	M25 Nottingham, United Kingdom	World Tour	Hard	(France) Jules Marie	4–6, 6–2, 7–6^{(7–4)}
Loss	2–5	May 2023	M25 Bodrum, Turkey	World Tour	Clay	(Germany) Rudolf Molleker	1–6, 6–7^{(4–7)}
Win	3–5	Jul 2023	M25 Roehampton, United Kingdom	World Tour	Hard	(United Kingdom) Luke Simkiss	6–2, 6–2
Loss	3–6	Jul 2024	M25 Nottingham, United Kingdom	World Tour	Grass	(Australia) James McCabe	0–6, 1–6
Win	4–6	Jul 2024	M25 Roehampton, United Kingdom	World Tour	Hard	(Norway) Viktor Durasovic	6–4, 6–3
Loss	4–7	Feb 2025	M25 Roehampton, United Kingdom	World Tour	Hard	(United Kingdom) Arthur Fery	4–6, 4–6
Win	5–7	Mar 2025	M25 Quinta do Lago, Portugal	World Tour	Hard	(Romania) Gabi Adrian Boltan	6–3, 6–4
Win	6–7	Mar 2025	M25 Vale de Lobo, Portugal	World Tour	Hard	(Portugal) Tiago Pereira	6–0, 7–5
Win	7–7	May 2025	M25 Nottingham, United Kingdom	World Tour	Hard	(United Kingdom) Charles Broom	6–2, 6–2
Win	8–7	Jul 2025	Segovia, Spain	Challenger	Hard	(Spain) Nicolás Álvarez Varona	7–6^{(7–4)}, 6–7^{(4–7)}, 6–4
Win	9–7	Sep 2025	M25 Falun, Sweden	World Tour	Hard (i)	(Finland) Eero Vasa	6–3, 6–3
Win	10–7	Aug 2026	Roehampton, United Kingdom	Challenger	Hard	(United Kingdom) Charles Broom	7–5, 6–3

=== Doubles: 1 (0–1) ===
Legend ATP Challengers (0–0) ITF Futures (0–1)	Finals by surface Hard (0–1) Clay (0–0) Grass (0–0) Carpet (0–0)

Result	W–L	Date	Tournament	Tier	Surface	Partner	Opponents	Score
Loss	0–1	Sep 2019	M15 Hua Hin, Thailand	Futures	Hard	(New Zealand) Ajeet Rai	(Chinese Taipei) Ray Ho (Canada) Kelsey Stevenson	6–7^{(4–7)}, 2–6
