= 2026 Wimbledon Championships – Men's singles qualifying =

Tennis championship

Gentlemen's singles qualifying
- 2026 Wimbledon Championships

Details
- Draw: 128
- Seeds: 32

Events
Singles	men	women		boys	girls
Doubles	men	women	mixed	boys	girls
WC Singles	men	women	quad
WC Doubles	men	women	quad
14&U Singles	boys	girls
Legends	men	women	mixed

Qualification
Singles	men	women
- Wimbledon Championships

The 2026 Wimbledon Championships – Men's singles qualifying was a series of tennis matches that took place from 22 to 25 June 2026 to determine the sixteen qualifiers into the main draw of the men's singles tournament.

16 out of the 128 qualifiers who compete in this knock-out tournament secured a main draw place.

== Seeds ==
All seeds are per ATP rankings as of 15 June 2026.

1. (Argentina) Francisco Comesaña (first round)
2. (Portugal) Jaime Faria (qualified)
3. (China) Bu Yunchaokete (second round)
4. (Hong Kong) Coleman Wong (first round)
5. (France) Hugo Gaston (qualified)
6. (Georgia (country)) Nikoloz Basilashvili (first round)
7. (Spain) Pablo Llamas Ruiz (qualifying competition, lucky loser)
8. (Norway) Nicolai Budkov Kjær (qualifying competition)
9. (Portugal) Henrique Rocha (first round)
10. (Italy) Francesco Maestrelli (first round)
11. (Australia) Dane Sweeny (qualified)
12. (Argentina) Facundo Díaz Acosta (first round)
13. (United States) Mackenzie McDonald (qualified)
14. (Lithuania) Vilius Gaubas (qualified)
15. Roman Safiullin (qualified)
16. (Italy) Stefano Travaglia (second round)
17. (Italy) Andrea Pellegrino (second round)
18. (France) Arthur Géa (second round)
19. (Spain) Pedro Martínez (first round)
20. (Chile) Tomás Barrios Vera (qualifying competition)
21. (Japan) Shintaro Mochizuki (qualified)
22. (Serbia) Dušan Lajović (qualifying competition, lucky loser)
23. (United Kingdom) Billy Harris (qualified)
24. (Denmark) August Holmgren (second round)
25. (France) Kyrian Jacquet (qualified)
26. (United States) Michael Zheng (qualified)
27. (Japan) Rei Sakamoto (qualifying competition)
28. (Australia) Tristan Schoolkate (qualifying competition)
29. (Tunisia) Moez Echargui (qualifying competition)
30. (Austria) Jurij Rodionov (second round)
31. (Greece) Stefanos Sakellaridis (qualifying competition)
32. (Australia) Christopher O'Connell (qualifying competition)

== Qualifiers ==
1. (South Korea) Kwon Soon-woo
2. (Portugal) Jaime Faria
3. (Japan) Shintaro Mochizuki
4. (United States) Michael Zheng
5. (France) Hugo Gaston
6. (France) Kyrian Jacquet
7. (United States) Tristan Boyer
8. (Finland) Otto Virtanen
9. (Colombia) Nicolás Mejía
10. (United Kingdom) Max Basing
11. (Australia) Dane Sweeny
12. (United Kingdom) Oliver Tarvet
13. (United States) Mackenzie McDonald
14. (Lithuania) Vilius Gaubas
15. Roman Safiullin
16. (United Kingdom) Billy Harris

== Lucky losers ==
1. (Spain) Pablo Llamas Ruiz
2. (Serbia) Dušan Lajović

== Draw ==
Key

- Q = Qualifier
- WC = Wild card
- LL = Lucky loser
- Alt = Alternate
- ITF = ITF entry
- PR = Protected ranking
- SR = Special ranking
- SE = Special exempt
- JE = Junior exempt
- JR = Junior Accelerator Programme entrant
- CO = College Accelerator Programme entrant
- NG = Next Gen Accelerator Program entrant
- w/o = Walkover
- r = Retired
- d = Defaulted

=== First qualifier ===
First round
1	(Argentina) Francisco Comesaña	6	6^{5}	4
(Spain) Alejandro Moro Cañas	4	7^{7}	6
PR	(United States) Nicolas Moreno de Alboran	2	2
(France) Harold Mayot	6	6
(Spain) Nikolás Sánchez Izquierdo	6^{7}	3
(South Korea) Kwon Soon-woo	7^{9}	6
(Italy) Raúl Brancaccio	5	3
18	(France) Arthur Géa	7	6

Second round
(Spain) Alejandro Moro Cañas	6	7^{7}
(France) Harold Mayot	3	6^{3}
(South Korea) Kwon Soon-woo	5	6	6
18	(France) Arthur Géa	7	3	4

Qualifying competition
(Spain) Alejandro Moro Cañas	4	6^{6}	3
(South Korea) Kwon Soon-woo	6	7^{8}	6

=== Second qualifier ===
First round
2	(Portugal) Jaime Faria	6	6
(France) Hugo Grenier	3	3
(Estonia) Mark Lajal	4	4
(France) Luka Pavlovic	6	6
(France) Clément Chidekh	4	4
PR	(Tunisia) Aziz Dougaz	6	6
WC	(United Kingdom) Anton Matusevich	6^{6}	6	3
27	(Japan) Rei Sakamoto	7^{8}	3	6

Second round
2	(Portugal) Jaime Faria	6	6
(France) Luka Pavlovic	4	4
PR	(Tunisia) Aziz Dougaz	4	4
27	(Japan) Rei Sakamoto	6	6

Qualifying competition
2	(Portugal) Jaime Faria	7^{7}	4	6	6
27	(Japan) Rei Sakamoto	6^{3}	6	3	4

=== Third qualifier ===
First round
3	(China) Bu Yunchaokete	6	6
(Bolivia) Hugo Dellien	4	0
(Argentina) Federico Agustín Gómez	3	4
(France) Clément Tabur	6	6
(Italy) Lorenzo Giustino	3	5
(Belgium) Gauthier Onclin	6	7
(Ukraine) Vitaliy Sachko	3	6^{4}
21	(Japan) Shintaro Mochizuki	6	7^{7}

Second round
3	(China) Bu Yunchaokete	7	6^{4}	4
(France) Clément Tabur	5	7^{7}	6
(Belgium) Gauthier Onclin	2	6	3
21	(Japan) Shintaro Mochizuki	6	4	6

Qualifying competition
(France) Clément Tabur	6	5	6	3	1
21	(Japan) Shintaro Mochizuki	1	7	2	6	6

=== Fourth qualifier ===
First round
4	(Hong Kong) Coleman Wong	6^{10}	2
(Croatia) Borna Gojo	7^{12}	6
(Ecuador) Andy Andrade	3	6	3
(United States) Colton Smith	6	4	6
(Serbia) Laslo Djere	6	7
(Netherlands) Max Houkes	4	5
(Germany) Henri Squire	2	6^{3}
26	(United States) Michael Zheng	6	7^{7}

Second round
(Croatia) Borna Gojo	4	4
(United States) Colton Smith	6	6
(Serbia) Laslo Djere	5	3
26	(United States) Michael Zheng	7	6

Qualifying competition
(United States) Colton Smith	4	6	2	3
26	(United States) Michael Zheng	6	4	6	6

=== Fifth qualifier ===
First round
5	(France) Hugo Gaston	4	6	6
(Argentina) Lautaro Midón	6	3	4
(Italy) Gianluca Cadenasso	3	2
(Italy) Federico Cinà	6	6
(United States) Keegan Smith	6	7^{7}
(Argentina) Juan Pablo Ficovich	1	6^{4}
(Lithuania) Edas Butvilas	6	5	3
29	(Tunisia) Moez Echargui	3	7	6

Second round
5	(France) Hugo Gaston	7	6
(Italy) Federico Cinà	5	4
(United States) Keegan Smith	4	6	6^{6}
29	(Tunisia) Moez Echargui	6	3	7^{10}

Qualifying competition
5	(France) Hugo Gaston	6	5	6	6
29	(Tunisia) Moez Echargui	1	7	2	4

=== Sixth qualifier ===
First round
6	(Georgia (country)) Nikoloz Basilashvili	6	3	6^{8}
(Sweden) Elias Ymer	2	6	7^{10}
(Kazakhstan) Timofey Skatov	6	7^{7}
(Argentina) Alex Barrena	3	6^{4}
(Italy) Andrea Guerrieri	3	7	6
(Belgium) David Goffin	6	5	2
(Brazil) Pedro Boscardin Dias	1	6^{3}
25	(France) Kyrian Jacquet	6	7^{7}

Second round
(Sweden) Elias Ymer	4	1
(Kazakhstan) Timofey Skatov	6	6
(Italy) Andrea Guerrieri	6^{9}	4
25	(France) Kyrian Jacquet	7^{11}	6

Qualifying competition
(Kazakhstan) Timofey Skatov	6^{5}	4	4
25	(France) Kyrian Jacquet	7^{7}	6	6

=== Seventh qualifier ===
First round
7	(Spain) Pablo Llamas Ruiz	6	6
(France) Dan Added	2	4
(Belgium) Gilles-Arnaud Bailly	4	4
(Spain) Pol Martín Tiffon	6	6
(United States) Tristan Boyer	6	6
(Argentina) Genaro Alberto Olivieri	1	4
(United Kingdom) Jay Clarke	6	6^{5}	4
17	(Italy) Andrea Pellegrino	2	7^{7}	6

Second round
7	(Spain) Pablo Llamas Ruiz	6	6
(Spain) Pol Martín Tiffon	4	2
(United States) Tristan Boyer	6	6
17	(Italy) Andrea Pellegrino	2	1

Qualifying competition
7	(Spain) Pablo Llamas Ruiz	5	7^{7}	6^{2}	3
(United States) Tristan Boyer	7	6^{4}	7^{7}	6

=== Eighth qualifier ===
First round
8	(Norway) Nicolai Budkov Kjær	6	6^{6}	6
(Brazil) João Lucas Reis da Silva	4	7^{8}	1
(Croatia) Matej Dodig	3	7^{7}	7^{10}
(Portugal) Frederico Ferreira Silva	6	6^{0}	6^{5}
(Japan) Rio Noguchi	2	3
(Italy) Luca Nardi	6	6
(Finland) Otto Virtanen	6	1	6
19	(Spain) Pedro Martínez	4	6	1

Second round
8	(Norway) Nicolai Budkov Kjær	6	7^{7}
(Croatia) Matej Dodig	2	6^{4}
(Italy) Luca Nardi	4	4
(Finland) Otto Virtanen	6	6

Qualifying competition
8	(Norway) Nicolai Budkov Kjær	6	4	4	5
(Finland) Otto Virtanen	4	6	6	7

=== Ninth qualifier ===
First round
9	(Portugal) Henrique Rocha	4	7^{8}	2
(Colombia) Nicolás Mejía	6	6^{6}	6
(Chinese Taipei) Tseng Chun-hsin	6^{8}	4
(Brazil) Gustavo Heide	7^{10}	6
(Bolivia) Juan Carlos Prado Ángelo	6^{2}	3
(United Kingdom) Dan Evans	7^{7}	6
WC	(United Kingdom) Johannus Monday	5	3
28	(Australia) Tristan Schoolkate	7	6

Second round
(Colombia) Nicolás Mejía	6	6
(Brazil) Gustavo Heide	4	3
(United Kingdom) Dan Evans	5	0
28	(Australia) Tristan Schoolkate	7	6

Qualifying competition
(Colombia) Nicolás Mejía	6	6	6
28	(Australia) Tristan Schoolkate	4	4	4

=== Tenth qualifier ===
First round
10	(Italy) Francesco Maestrelli	6	6^{2}	4
WC	(United Kingdom) Max Basing	4	7^{7}	6
(Germany) Tom Gentzsch	6	6
(Czech Republic) Zdeněk Kolář	3	3
(Canada) Liam Draxl	6	6^{3}	1
(Switzerland) Rémy Bertola	2	7^{7}	6
(United Kingdom) Oliver Crawford	4	4
30	(Austria) Jurij Rodionov	6	6

Second round
WC	(United Kingdom) Max Basing	7	6
(Germany) Tom Gentzsch	5	2
(Switzerland) Rémy Bertola	4	7^{7}	6
30	(Austria) Jurij Rodionov	6	6^{4}	2

Qualifying competition
WC	(United Kingdom) Max Basing	2	6	3	7	6
(Switzerland) Rémy Bertola	6	4	6	5	2

=== Eleventh qualifier ===
First round
11	(Australia) Dane Sweeny	6	6
(Uruguay) Franco Roncadelli	4	2
(United States) Darwin Blanch	7^{7}	6
Alt	(Romania) Filip Cristian Jianu	6^{1}	4
(France) Pierre-Hugues Herbert	5	6^{6}
WC	(United Kingdom) Paul Jubb	7	7^{8}
(Italy) Marco Cecchinato	6^{2}	3
20	(Chile) Tomás Barrios Vera	7^{7}	6

Second round
11	(Australia) Dane Sweeny	2	7^{9}	4
(United States) Darwin Blanch	6	6^{7}	0^{r}
WC	(United Kingdom) Paul Jubb	4	6	1
20	(Chile) Tomás Barrios Vera	6	3	6

Qualifying competition
11	(Australia) Dane Sweeny	4	6	7^{7}	0	6
20	(Chile) Tomás Barrios Vera	6	4	6^{5}	6	2

=== Twelfth qualifier ===
First round
12	(Argentina) Facundo Díaz Acosta	2	2
(Canada) Alexis Galarneau	6	6
WC	(United Kingdom) Oliver Tarvet	7^{7}	7
(Australia) Alex Bolt	6^{3}	5
PR	(Argentina) Federico Coria	7^{7}	6
WC	(United Kingdom) Oliver Bonding	6^{5}	2
(Chinese Taipei) Hsu Yu-hsiou	4	2
31	(Greece) Stefanos Sakellaridis	6	6

Second round
(Canada) Alexis Galarneau	5	2
WC	(United Kingdom) Oliver Tarvet	7	6
PR	(Argentina) Federico Coria	3	4
31	(Greece) Stefanos Sakellaridis	6	6

Qualifying competition
WC	(United Kingdom) Oliver Tarvet	6	6	7
31	(Greece) Stefanos Sakellaridis	4	2	5

=== Thirteenth qualifier ===
First round
13	(United States) Mackenzie McDonald	6	6^{5}	6
PR	(Brazil) Felipe Meligeni Alves	2	7^{7}	3
WC	(United Kingdom) Mark Ceban	2	4
(Spain) Roberto Carballés Baena	6	6
(Japan) Kaichi Uchida	3	2
(Australia) Bernard Tomic	6	6
(Austria) Joel Schwärzler	6^{3}	4
32	(Australia) Christopher O'Connell	7^{7}	6

Second round
13	(United States) Mackenzie McDonald	6	6
(Spain) Roberto Carballés Baena	4	4
(Australia) Bernard Tomic	4	4
32	(Australia) Christopher O'Connell	6	6

Qualifying competition
13	(United States) Mackenzie McDonald	6	6	6
32	(Australia) Christopher O'Connell	3	4	4

=== Fourteenth qualifier ===
First round
14	(Lithuania) Vilius Gaubas	4	6	6
(United States) Michael Mmoh	6	3	2
(China) Zhang Zhizhen	3	4
WC	(United Kingdom) Henry Searle	6	6
(France) Florent Bax	7^{7}	1	4
(Luxembourg) Chris Rodesch	6^{4}	6	6
(Austria) Lukas Neumayer	4	4
22	(Serbia) Dušan Lajović	6	6

Second round
14	(Lithuania) Vilius Gaubas	7^{7}	7^{7}
WC	(United Kingdom) Henry Searle	6^{5}	6^{5}
(Luxembourg) Chris Rodesch	2	4
22	(Serbia) Dušan Lajović	6	6

Qualifying competition
14	(Lithuania) Vilius Gaubas	3	6	3	6	6
22	(Serbia) Dušan Lajović	6	4	6	3	4

=== Fifteenth qualifier ===
First round
15	Roman Safiullin	6	7^{7}
(Australia) James McCabe	3	6^{4}
(Estonia) Daniil Glinka	4	3
(Belgium) Kimmer Coppejans	6	6
(Switzerland) Jérôme Kym	4	7	6
(Peru) Gonzalo Bueno	6	5	1
(United Kingdom) Liam Broady	6^{6}	6	5
24	(Denmark) August Holmgren	7^{8}	4	7

Second round
15	Roman Safiullin	7^{7}	7
(Belgium) Kimmer Coppejans	6^{2}	5
(Switzerland) Jérôme Kym	6	6
24	(Denmark) August Holmgren	4	3

Qualifying competition
15	Roman Safiullin	4	7^{7}	3	7^{8}	6
(Switzerland) Jérôme Kym	6	6^{2}	6	6^{6}	4

=== Sixteenth qualifier ===
First round
16	(Italy) Stefano Travaglia	7	7^{7}
(Croatia) Luka Mikrut	5	6^{3}
(Netherlands) Guy den Ouden	4	4
(China) Zhou Yi	6	6
(Hungary) Zsombor Piros	6	6
WC	(Bulgaria) Ivan Ivanov	2	2
(Italy) Stefano Napolitano	2	2
23	(United Kingdom) Billy Harris	6	6

Second round
16	(Italy) Stefano Travaglia	6^{7}	4
(China) Zhou Yi	7^{9}	6
(Hungary) Zsombor Piros	4	4
23	(United Kingdom) Billy Harris	6	6

Qualifying competition
(China) Zhou Yi	6	6^{2}	2	3
23	(United Kingdom) Billy Harris	1	7^{7}	6	6
