= 2025 Wimbledon Championships – Men's singles =

Tennis championship

Gentlemen's singles
- 2025 Wimbledon Championships

Final
- Champion: (Italy) Jannik Sinner
- Runner-up: (Spain) Carlos Alcaraz
- Score: 4–6, 6–4, 6–4, 6–4
- Date: 13 July 2025

Details
- Draw: 128 (16Q / 8WC)
- Seeds: 32

Events
Singles	men	women		boys	girls
Doubles	men	women	mixed	boys	girls
WC Singles	men	women	quad
WC Doubles	men	women	quad
14&U Singles	boys	girls
Legends	men	women	mixed

Qualification
Singles	men	women
- Wimbledon Championships

Jannik Sinner defeated two-time defending champion Carlos Alcaraz in the final, 4–6, 6–4, 6–4, 6–4 to win the gentlemen's singles tennis title at the 2025 Wimbledon Championships. It was his first Wimbledon title and fourth major title overall. With the win, Sinner ended Alcaraz's undefeated 5–0 record in major finals, and became the first Italian to win a Wimbledon singles title.

At 23 years, 331 days old, Sinner was the second-youngest man to reach the final at all four majors after Jim Courier at 22 years, 321 days old, a record that was later broken by Alcaraz at the 2026 Australian Open at 22 years, 272 days old. Sinner and Alcaraz joined Roger Federer and Rafael Nadal as the only men's pair to contest both the French Open and Wimbledon finals in the same season.

With his third round win, Novak Djokovic recorded his 100th match win at Wimbledon and became the second man to record 100 or more wins at two majors (after Federer), in addition to the French Open. Djokovic made his 19th career third round appearance and 14th semifinal appearance at Wimbledon, the most by any man in the Open Era. His defeat to Sinner in the semifinals marked the first time since 2017 that Djokovic did not reach the final, ending a streak of six consecutive final appearances. It also marked the first instance where none of the "Big Four" were present in a Wimbledon final since 2002, ending their streak at 21-consecutive finals, of which 9 featured both finalists from the Big Four.

13 out of the 32 seeds lost in the first round, the most to do so at Wimbledon in the Open Era, and tied the record set for any major at the 2004 Australian Open.

The event marked the final professional appearance of former world No. 9 Fabio Fognini. He lost in the first round to Alcaraz.

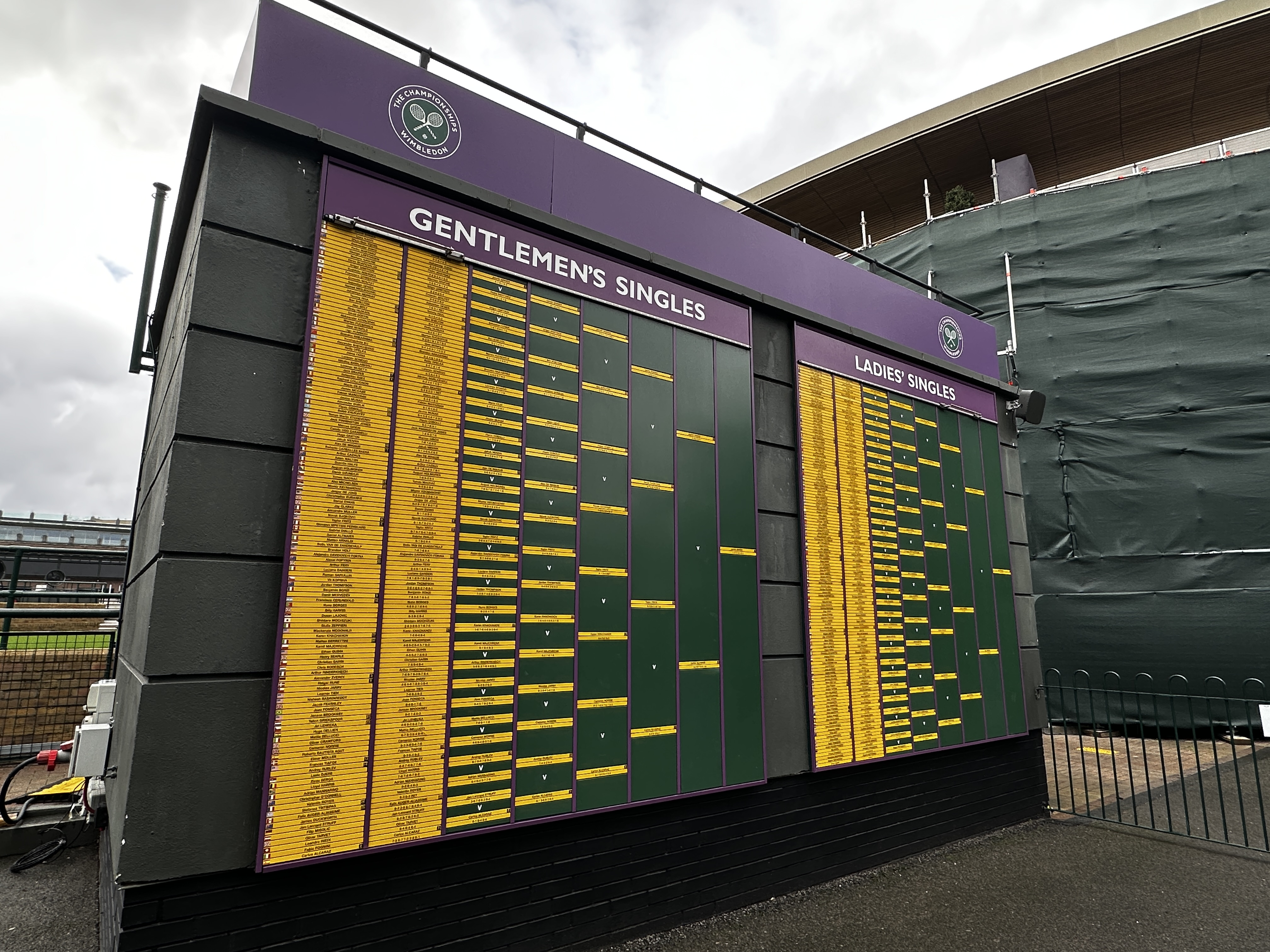
2025 Ladies' and Gentlemen's singles Wimbledon Championships draws and scoreboards

== Seeds ==
1. (Italy) Jannik Sinner (champion)
2. (Spain) Carlos Alcaraz (final)
3. (Germany) Alexander Zverev (first round)
4. (United Kingdom) Jack Draper (second round)
5. (United States) Taylor Fritz (semifinals)
6. (Serbia) Novak Djokovic (semifinals)
7. (Italy) Lorenzo Musetti (first round)
8. (Denmark) Holger Rune (first round)
9. Daniil Medvedev (first round)
10. (United States) Ben Shelton (quarterfinals)
11. (Australia) Alex de Minaur (fourth round)
12. (United States) Frances Tiafoe (second round)
13. (United States) Tommy Paul (second round)
14. Andrey Rublev (fourth round)
15. (Czech Republic) Jakub Menšík (third round)
16. (Argentina) Francisco Cerúndolo (first round)
17. Karen Khachanov (quarterfinals)
18. (France) Ugo Humbert (first round)
19. (Bulgaria) Grigor Dimitrov (fourth round, retired)
20. (Australia) Alexei Popyrin (first round)
21. (Czech Republic) Tomáš Macháč (second round)
22. (Italy) Flavio Cobolli (quarterfinals)
23. (Czech Republic) Jiří Lehečka (second round)
24. (Greece) Stefanos Tsitsipas (first round, retired)
25. (Canada) Félix Auger-Aliassime (second round)
26. (Spain) Alejandro Davidovich Fokina (third round)
27. (Canada) Denis Shapovalov (first round)
28. (Kazakhstan) Alexander Bublik (first round)
29. (United States) Brandon Nakashima (third round)
30. (United States) Alex Michelsen (first round)
31. (Netherlands) Tallon Griekspoor (first round)
32. (Italy) Matteo Berrettini (first round)

== Draw ==
Key

- Q = Qualifier
- WC = Wild card
- LL = Lucky loser
- Alt = Alternate
- ITF = ITF entry
- PR = Protected ranking
- SR = Special ranking
- SE = Special exempt
- JE = Junior exempt
- JR = Junior Accelerator Programme entrant
- CO = College Accelerator Programme entrant
- NG = Next Gen Accelerator Program entrant
- w/o = Walkover
- r = Retired
- d = Defaulted

=== Finals ===
Quarterfinals
1	(Italy) Jannik Sinner	7^{7}	6	6
10	(United States) Ben Shelton	6^{2}	4	4
22	(Italy) Flavio Cobolli	7^{8}	2	5	4
6	(Serbia) Novak Djokovic	6^{6}	6	7	6
5	(United States) Taylor Fritz	6	6	1	7^{7}
17	Karen Khachanov	3	4	6	6^{4}
(United Kingdom) Cameron Norrie	2	3	3
2	(Spain) Carlos Alcaraz	6	6	6

Semifinals
1	(Italy) Jannik Sinner	6	6	6
6	(Serbia) Novak Djokovic	3	3	4
5	(United States) Taylor Fritz	4	7	3	6^{6}
2	(Spain) Carlos Alcaraz	6	5	6	7^{8}

Final
1	(Italy) Jannik Sinner	4	6	6	6
2	(Spain) Carlos Alcaraz	6	4	4	4

=== Top half ===
==== Section 1 ====
First round
1	(Italy) J Sinner	6	6	6
(Italy) L Nardi	4	3	0
(Chinese Taipei) C-h Tseng	3	4	6	6^{5}
(Australia) A Vukic	6	6	4	7^{7}
(Spain) P Martínez	2	6	6	6
WC	(United Kingdom) G Loffhagen	6	2	4	2
(Argentina) M Navone	3	6	6	6
27	(Canada) D Shapovalov	6	4	1	4
19	(Bulgaria) G Dimitrov	6	6	6
(Japan) Y Nishioka	2	3	4
(Argentina) F Comesaña	4	4	2
(France) C Moutet	6	6	6
PR	(Austria) S Ofner	7^{10}	3
(Serbia) H Medjedovic	6^{8}	1^{r}
WC	(United Kingdom) J Monday	4	4	2
13	(United States) T Paul	6	6	6

Second round
1	(Italy) J Sinner	6	6	6
(Australia) A Vukic	1	1	3
(Spain) P Martínez	7	7	7^{8}
(Argentina) M Navone	5	5	6^{6}
19	(Bulgaria) G Dimitrov	7	4	7	7
(France) C Moutet	5	6	5	5
PR	(Austria) S Ofner	1	7	6	7
13	(United States) T Paul	6	5	4	5

Third round
1	(Italy) J Sinner	6	6	6
(Spain) P Martínez	1	3	1
19	(Bulgaria) G Dimitrov	6	6	7^{7}
PR	(Austria) S Ofner	3	4	6^{0}

Fourth round
1	(Italy) J Sinner	3	5	2
19	(Bulgaria) G Dimitrov	6	7	2^{r}

==== Section 2 ====
First round
10	(United States) B Shelton	6	7^{7}	7^{7}
Q	(Australia) A Bolt	4	6^{1}	6^{4}
(Australia) R Hijikata	6	6	6
(Belgium) D Goffin	3	1	1
(United States) A Kovacevic	3	7^{7}	1	7	4
LL	(Hungary) M Fucsovics	6	6^{5}	6	5	6
(France) G Monfils	6	3	6^{5}	7	6
18	(France) U Humbert	4	6	7^{7}	5	2
29	(United States) B Nakashima	6	4	7^{7}	6
(China) Y Bu	4	6	6^{1}	4
(Kazakhstan) A Shevchenko	3	5	6^{4}
(United States) R Opelka	6	7	7^{7}
Q	(Portugal) J Faria	3	4	2
(Italy) L Sonego	6	6	6
Q	(Georgia (country)) N Basilashvili	6	4	7	6
7	(Italy) L Musetti	2	6	5	1

Second round
10	(United States) B Shelton	6	7	6
(Australia) R Hijikata	2	5	4
LL	(Hungary) M Fucsovics	6	1	4	7^{7}	6
(France) G Monfils	4	6	6	6^{5}	4
29	(United States) B Nakashima	7	6	6^{6}	6
(United States) R Opelka	5	2	7^{8}	3
(Italy) L Sonego	6	6	6^{3}	7^{7}
Q	(Georgia (country)) N Basilashvili	1	3	7^{7}	6^{4}

Third round
10	(United States) B Shelton	6	7^{7}	6
LL	(Hungary) M Fucsovics	3	6^{4}	2
29	(United States) B Nakashima	7^{7}	6^{8}	6^{2}	6	6^{3}
(Italy) L Sonego	6^{5}	7^{10}	7^{7}	3	7^{10}

Fourth round
10	(United States) B Shelton	3	6	7^{7}	7
(Italy) L Sonego	6	1	6^{1}	5

==== Section 3 ====
First round
4	(United Kingdom) J Draper	6	6	2
(Argentina) S Báez	2	2	1^{r}
(Belgium) R Collignon	3	4	3
(Croatia) M Čilić	6	6	6
Q	(Australia) J McCabe	1	4	3
(Hungary) F Marozsán	6	6	6
(Spain) J Munar	6	3	4	7^{7}	6
28	(Kazakhstan) A Bublik	4	6	6	6^{5}	2
22	(Italy) F Cobolli	6	7^{9}	6
Q	(Kazakhstan) B Zhukayev	3	6^{7}	1
(Argentina) TM Etcheverry	6^{4}	3	5
WC	(United Kingdom) J Pinnington Jones	7^{7}	6	7
(United States) M Giron	7^{8}	7^{7}	6
(Argentina) C Ugo Carabelli	6^{6}	6^{4}	3
(France) H Gaston	1	6	2	2
15	(Czech Republic) J Menšík	6	4	6	6

Second round
4	(United Kingdom) J Draper	4	3	6	4
(Croatia) M Čilić	6	6	1	6
(Hungary) F Marozsán	2	3	6^{9}
(Spain) J Munar	6	6	7^{11}
22	(Italy) F Cobolli	6	7^{8}	6
WC	(United Kingdom) J Pinnington Jones	1	6^{6}	2
(United States) M Giron	4	6	4	6^{4}
15	(Czech Republic) J Menšík	6	3	6	7^{7}

Third round
(Croatia) M Čilić	6	3	6	6
(Spain) J Munar	3	6	2	4
22	(Italy) F Cobolli	6	6	6
15	(Czech Republic) J Menšík	2	4	2

Fourth round
(Croatia) M Čilić	4	4	7^{7}	6^{3}
22	(Italy) F Cobolli	6	6	6^{4}	7^{7}

==== Section 4 ====
First round
11	(Australia) A de Minaur	6	6	7^{7}
(Spain) R Carballés Baena	2	2	6^{2}
Q	(France) A Cazaux	6	7^{8}	4	6^{5}	6
(Australia) A Walton	3	6^{6}	6	7^{7}	1
(France) Q Halys	6^{4}	3	4
Q	(Denmark) A Holmgren	7^{7}	6	6
(Bosnia and Herzegovina) D Džumhur	3	2	4
21	(Czech Republic) T Macháč	6	6	6
30	(United States) A Michelsen	2	6	3	6	6^{6}
(Serbia) M Kecmanović	6	3	6	3	7^{10}
(Netherlands) J de Jong	6	6^{5}	6^{7}	6	7^{10}
(United States) C Eubanks	3	7^{7}	7^{9}	3	6^{3}
WC	(United Kingdom) D Evans	6	7	6
WC	(United Kingdom) J Clarke	1	5	2
(France) A Müller	1	7^{9}	2	2
6	(Serbia) N Djokovic	6	6^{7}	6	6

Second round
11	(Australia) A de Minaur	4	6	6	6
Q	(France) A Cazaux	6	2	4	0
Q	(Denmark) A Holmgren	7^{7}	6^{8}	6^{5}	7	7^{10}
21	(Czech Republic) T Macháč	6^{5}	7^{10}	7^{7}	5	6^{5}
(Serbia) M Kecmanović	1	6	6	6
(Netherlands) J de Jong	6	3	2	4
WC	(United Kingdom) D Evans	3	2	0
6	(Serbia) N Djokovic	6	6	6

Third round
11	(Australia) A de Minaur	6	7^{7}	6
Q	(Denmark) A Holmgren	4	6^{5}	3
(Serbia) M Kecmanović	3	0	4
6	(Serbia) N Djokovic	6	6	6

Fourth round
11	(Australia) A de Minaur	6	4	4	4
6	(Serbia) N Djokovic	1	6	6	6

=== Bottom half ===
==== Section 5 ====
First round
5	(United States) T Fritz	6^{6}	6^{8}	6	7^{8}	6
(France) G Mpetshi Perricard	7^{8}	7^{10}	4	6^{6}	4
(Canada) G Diallo	6	6	6
(Germany) D Altmaier	1	2	4
(Italy) M Arnaldi	6^{4}	6^{5}	4
(Netherlands) B van de Zandschulp	7^{7}	7^{7}	6
(United States) B Holt	2	4	5
26	(Spain) A Davidovich Fokina	6	6	7
20	(Australia) A Popyrin	4	1	6	4
WC	(United Kingdom) A Fery	6	6	4	6
(Italy) L Darderi	7^{7}	1	6^{2}	6	6
R Safiullin	6^{3}	6	7^{7}	3	1
(Czech Republic) V Kopřiva	6	6	3	6^{1}	1
(Australia) J Thompson	3	4	6	7^{7}	6
(France) B Bonzi	7^{7}	3	7^{7}	6
9	D Medvedev	6^{2}	6	6^{3}	2

Second round
5	(United States) T Fritz	3	6	7^{7}	4	6
(Canada) G Diallo	6	3	6^{0}	6	3
(Netherlands) B van de Zandschulp	1	6	3	6^{5}
26	(Spain) A Davidovich Fokina	6	4	6	7^{7}
WC	(United Kingdom) A Fery	4	3	3
(Italy) L Darderi	6	6	6
(Australia) J Thompson	7	6^{2}	4	6	6
(France) B Bonzi	5	7^{7}	6	2	4

Third round
5	(United States) T Fritz	6	6	6^{5}	6
26	(Spain) A Davidovich Fokina	4	3	7^{7}	1
(Italy) L Darderi	4	4	6	3
(Australia) J Thompson	6	6	3	6

Fourth round
5	(United States) T Fritz	6	3
(Australia) J Thompson	1	0^{r}

==== Section 6 ====
First round
16	(Argentina) F Cerúndolo	6	3	6^{5}	0
(Portugal) N Borges	4	6	7^{7}	6
(United Kingdom) B Harris	6	6	6
LL	(Serbia) D Lajović	3	2	4
Q	(Japan) S Mochizuki	2	3	6	7^{8}	7
Q	(Italy) G Zeppieri	6	6	3	6^{6}	5
(United States) M McDonald	5	4	4
17	K Khachanov	7	6	6
32	(Italy) M Berrettini	6	2	4	7	3
(Poland) K Majchrzak	4	6	6	5	6
(United States) E Quinn	4	6	7^{13}	6
WC	(United Kingdom) H Searle	6	2	6^{11}	2
LL	(Chile) C Garín	7^{10}	6	6
Q	(Luxembourg) C Rodesch	6^{8}	4	4
(France) A Rinderknech	7^{7}	6^{8}	6	6^{5}	6
3	(Germany) A Zverev	6^{3}	7^{10}	3	7^{7}	4

Second round
(Portugal) N Borges	6	6	7^{9}
(United Kingdom) B Harris	3	4	6^{7}
Q	(Japan) S Mochizuki	6	6^{7}	6	3	4
17	K Khachanov	1	7^{9}	4	6	6
(Poland) K Majchrzak	6	6	6
(United States) E Quinn	1	4	3
LL	(Chile) C Garín	6	3	6^{3}	6	3
(France) A Rinderknech	3	6	7^{7}	4	6

Third round
(Portugal) N Borges	6^{6}	6	6	3	6^{8}
17	K Khachanov	7^{8}	4	4	6	7^{10}
(Poland) K Majchrzak	6	7^{7}	7^{8}
(France) A Rinderknech	3	6^{4}	6^{6}

Fourth round
17	K Khachanov	6	6	6
(Poland) K Majchrzak	4	2	3

==== Section 7 ====
First round
8	(Denmark) H Rune	6	6	5	3	4
Q	(Chile) N Jarry	4	4	7	6	6
(United States) L Tien	7^{7}	6	6
(United States) N Basavareddy	6^{5}	3	2
(United Kingdom) J Fearnley	4	1	6^{5}
(Brazil) J Fonseca	6	6	7^{7}
PR	(United States) J Brooksby	6	7	6
31	(Netherlands) T Griekspoor	2	5	3
23	(Czech Republic) J Lehečka	4	6	6	7^{7}
(Bolivia) H Dellien	6	2	2	6^{0}
(Italy) M Bellucci	6^{2}	6	6	6
WC	(United Kingdom) O Crawford	7^{7}	3	4	4
(United Kingdom) C Norrie	6	3	6	7^{7}
(Spain) R Bautista Agut	3	6	4	6^{3}
(Denmark) E Møller	3	4	2
12	(United States) F Tiafoe	6	6	6

Second round
Q	(Chile) N Jarry	6	6	6
(United States) L Tien	2	2	3
(Brazil) J Fonseca	6	5	6	6
PR	(United States) J Brooksby	4	7	2	4
23	(Czech Republic) J Lehečka	6^{4}	1	5
(Italy) M Bellucci	7^{7}	6	7
(United Kingdom) C Norrie	4	6	6	7
12	(United States) F Tiafoe	6	4	3	5

Third round
Q	(Chile) N Jarry	6	6	3	7^{7}
(Brazil) J Fonseca	3	4	6	6^{4}
(Italy) M Bellucci	6^{5}	4	3
(United Kingdom) C Norrie	7^{7}	6	6

Fourth round
Q	(Chile) N Jarry	3	6^{4}	7^{9}	7^{7}	3
(United Kingdom) C Norrie	6	7^{7}	6^{7}	6^{5}	6

==== Section 8 ====
First round
14	A Rublev	6	7^{7}	6^{9}	7^{8}
(Serbia) L Djere	0	6^{5}	7^{11}	6^{6}
(Belgium) Z Bergs	6^{7}	6^{2}	7^{7}	2
PR	(South Africa) L Harris	7^{9}	7^{7}	6^{5}	6
Q	(France) A Mannarino	6	6	6
(Australia) C O'Connell	2	4	3
Q	(France) V Royer	6	6	0
24	(Greece) S Tsitsipas	3	2	0^{r}
25	(Canada) F Auger-Aliassime	6	3	6^{2}	6	6
(Australia) J Duckworth	2	6	7^{7}	4	4
(Germany) J-L Struff	6	5	6	6
Q	(Austria) F Misolic	2	7	3	3
Q	(United Kingdom) O Tarvet	6	6	6
Q	(Switzerland) L Riedi	4	4	4
(Italy) F Fognini	5	7^{7}	5	6	1
2	(Spain) C Alcaraz	7	6^{5}	7	2	6

Second round
14	A Rublev	6^{1}	6	7^{7}	6
PR	(South Africa) L Harris	7^{7}	4	6^{5}	3
Q	(France) A Mannarino	6	6	5	7^{7}
Q	(France) V Royer	4	4	7	6^{1}
25	(Canada) F Auger-Aliassime	6	6^{9}	3	4
(Germany) J-L Struff	3	7^{11}	6	6
Q	(United Kingdom) O Tarvet	1	4	4
2	(Spain) C Alcaraz	6	6	6

Third round
14	A Rublev	7	6	6
Q	(France) A Mannarino	5	2	3
(Germany) J-L Struff	1	6	3	4
2	(Spain) C Alcaraz	6	3	6	6

Fourth round
14	A Rublev	7^{7}	3	4	4
2	(Spain) C Alcaraz	6^{5}	6	6	6

== Seeded players ==
The following are the seeded players. Seedings are based on ATP rankings as of 23 June 2025. Rankings and points before are as of 30 June 2025.

^{‡}	Champion
^{†}	Runner-up

Seed	Rank	Player	Points before	Points defending	Points earned	Points after	Status
1	1	(Italy) Jannik Sinner	10,430	400	2,000	12,030	Champion, defeated (Spain) Carlos Alcaraz [2]
2	2	(Spain) Carlos Alcaraz	9,300	2,000	1,300	8,600	Runner-up, lost to (Italy) Jannik Sinner [1]
3	3	(Germany) Alexander Zverev	6,500	200	10	6,310	First round lost to (France) Arthur Rinderknech
4	4	(United Kingdom) Jack Draper	4,650	50	50	4,650	Second round lost to (Croatia) Marin Čilić
5	5	(United States) Taylor Fritz	4,635	400	800	5,035	Semifinals lost to (Spain) Carlos Alcaraz [2]
6	6	(Serbia) Novak Djokovic	4,630	1,300	800	4,130	Semifinals lost to (Italy) Jannik Sinner [1]
7	7	(Italy) Lorenzo Musetti	4,140	800	10	3,350	First round lost to (Georgia (country)) Nikoloz Basilashvili [Q]
8	8	(Denmark) Holger Rune	3,530	200	10	3,340	First round lost to (Chile) Nicolás Jarry [Q]
9	9	Daniil Medvedev	3,420	800	10	2,630	First round lost to (France) Benjamin Bonzi
10	10	(United States) Ben Shelton	3,130	200	400	3,330	Quarterfinals lost to (Italy) Jannik Sinner [1]
11	11	(Australia) Alex de Minaur	3,085	400	200	2,885	Fourth round lost to (Serbia) Novak Djokovic [6]
12	12	(United States) Frances Tiafoe	2,990	100	50	2,940	Second round lost to (United Kingdom) Cameron Norrie
13	13	(United States) Tommy Paul	2,970	400	50	2,620	Second round lost to (Austria) Sebastian Ofner [PR]
14	14	Andrey Rublev	2,920	10	200	3,110	Fourth round lost to (Spain) Carlos Alcaraz [2]
15	17	(Czech Republic) Jakub Menšík	2,356	10	100	2,446	Third round lost to (Italy) Flavio Cobolli [22]
16	19	(Argentina) Francisco Cerúndolo	2,285	10	10	2,285	First round lost to (Portugal) Nuno Borges
17	20	Karen Khachanov	2,240	50	400	2,590	Quarterfinals lost to (United States) Taylor Fritz [5]
18	18	(France) Ugo Humbert	2,285	200	10	2,095	First round lost to (France) Gaël Monfils
19	21	(Bulgaria) Grigor Dimitrov	2,155	200	200	2,155	Fourth round retired against (Italy) Jannik Sinner [1]
20	22	(Australia) Alexei Popyrin	2,140	100	10	2,050	First round lost to (United Kingdom) Arthur Fery [WC]
21	23	(Czech Republic) Tomáš Macháč	2,110	50	50	2,110	Second round lost to (Denmark) August Holmgren [Q]
22	24	(Italy) Flavio Cobolli	2,035	50	400	2,385	Quarterfinals lost to (Serbia) Novak Djokovic [6]
23	25	(Czech Republic) Jiří Lehečka	1,965	0	50	2,015	Second round lost to (Italy) Mattia Bellucci
24	26	(Greece) Stefanos Tsitsipas	1,920	50	10	1,880	First round retired against (France) Valentin Royer [Q]
25	28	(Canada) Félix Auger-Aliassime	1,825	10	50	1,865	Second round lost to (Germany) Jan-Lennard Struff
26	27	(Spain) Alejandro Davidovich Fokina	1,845	0	100	1,945	Third round lost to (United States) Taylor Fritz [5]
27	30	(Canada) Denis Shapovalov	1,676	100	10	1,586	First round lost to (Argentina) Mariano Navone
28	31	(Kazakhstan) Alexander Bublik	1,675	100	10	1,585	First round lost to (Spain) Jaume Munar
29	34	(United States) Brandon Nakashima	1,650	100	100	1,650	Third round lost to (Italy) Lorenzo Sonego
30	32	(United States) Alex Michelsen	1,670	10	10	1,670	First round lost to (Serbia) Miomir Kecmanović
31	29	(Netherlands) Tallon Griekspoor	1,755	50	10	1,715	First round lost to (United States) Jenson Brooksby [PR]
32	35	(Italy) Matteo Berrettini	1,515	50	10	1,475	First round lost to (Poland) Kamil Majchrzak

=== Withdrawn seeded players ===
The following players would have been seeded, but withdrew before the tournament began.

Rank	Player	Points before	Points dropping	Points after	Withdrawal reason
15	(Norway) Casper Ruud	2,905	50	2,855	Knee injury
16	(France) Arthur Fils	2,830	200	2,630	Back injury
33	(United States) Sebastian Korda	1,655	10	1,645	Leg injury

== Other entry information ==
=== Wildcards ===
- (United Kingdom) Jay Clarke
- (United Kingdom) Oliver Crawford
- (United Kingdom) Dan Evans
- (United Kingdom) Arthur Fery
- (United Kingdom) George Loffhagen
- (United Kingdom) Johannus Monday
- (United Kingdom) Jack Pinnington Jones
- (United Kingdom) Henry Searle

=== Protected ranking ===
- (United States) Jenson Brooksby (52)
- (Austria) Sebastian Ofner (74)
- (South Africa) Lloyd Harris (108)

=== Qualifiers ===
- (Georgia (country)) Nikoloz Basilashvili
- (Australia) Alex Bolt
- (France) Arthur Cazaux
- (Portugal) Jaime Faria
- (Denmark) August Holmgren
- (Chile) Nicolás Jarry
- (France) Adrian Mannarino
- (Australia) James McCabe
- (Austria) Filip Misolic
- (Japan) Shintaro Mochizuki
- (Switzerland) Leandro Riedi
- (Luxembourg) Chris Rodesch
- (France) Valentin Royer
- (United Kingdom) Oliver Tarvet
- (Italy) Giulio Zeppieri
- (Kazakhstan) Beibit Zhukayev

=== Lucky losers ===
- (Hungary) Márton Fucsovics
- (Chile) Cristian Garín
- (Serbia) Dušan Lajović

=== Withdrawals ===
- ‡ (China) Shang Juncheng (71) → replaced by (United States) Nishesh Basavareddy (101)
- ‡ (Finland) Emil Ruusuvuori (83 PR) → replaced by (United States) Brandon Holt (102)
- ‡ (Japan) Kei Nishikori (62) → replaced by (United Kingdom) Billy Harris (103)
- ‡ (Chile) Alejandro Tabilo (61) → replaced by (Croatia) Marin Čilić (104)
- ‡ (United States) Sebastian Korda (23) → replaced by (United States) Christopher Eubanks (105)
- ‡ (Australia) Nick Kyrgios (21 PR) → replaced by (United States) Ethan Quinn (106)
- ‡ (France) Arthur Fils (14) → replaced by (Italy) Fabio Fognini (107)
- ‡ (Norway) Casper Ruud (16) → replaced by (Denmark) Elmer Møller (108)
- ‡ (China) Zhang Zhizhen (81) → replaced by (South Africa) Lloyd Harris (108 PR)
- @ (Croatia) Borna Ćorić (83) → replaced by (Hungary) Márton Fucsovics (LL)
- § (Poland) Hubert Hurkacz (39) → replaced by (Serbia) Dušan Lajović (LL)
- § (Spain) Pablo Carreño Busta (93) → replaced by (Chile) Cristian Garín (LL)

‡ – withdrew from entry list before qualifying began
@ – withdrew from entry list after qualifying began
§ – withdrew from main draw

== Finals statistics ==
Category	Sinner	Alcaraz
Aces	8	15
Double faults	2	7
1st serve % in	72–116 = 62%	64–121 = 53%
Winning % on 1st Serve	53–72 = 74%	48–64 = 75%
Winning % on 2nd Serve	27–44 = 61%	29–57 = 51%
Net points won	30–40 = 75%	17–23 = 74%
Break points won	4–9 = 44%	2–6 = 33%
Receiving points won	44–121 = 36%	36–116 = 31%
Winners	40	38
Unforced errors	40	36
Winners-UFE	0	2
Total points won	124	113
Total games won	22	18

Preceded by 2025 French Open – Men's singles	Grand Slam men's singles	Succeeded by 2025 US Open – Men's singles
