= Oliver Tarvet =

British tennis player (born 2003)

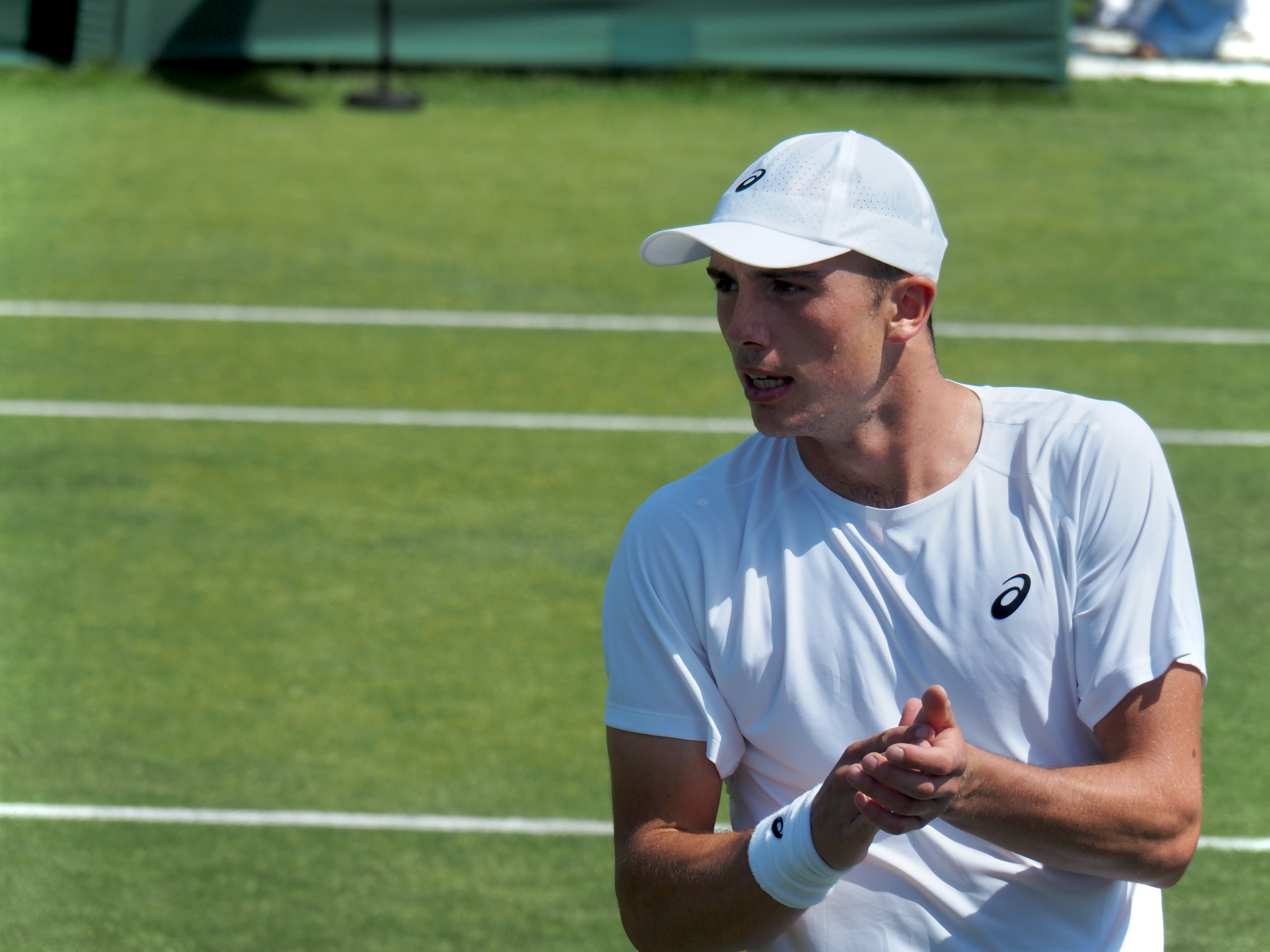
- Tarvet playing at Wimbledon Qualifying in 2026
- Country (sports): United Kingdom
- Residence: San Diego, California, US
- Born: 29 October 2003 (age 23) St Albans, Hertfordshire, England
- Height: 1.85 m (6 ft 1 in)
- Turned pro: 2023
- Plays: Right-handed (two-handed backhand)
- College: San Diego
- Coach: Ryan Keckley, Alex Funkhouser, Stuart Havelock
- Prize money: US $316,033

Singles
- Career record: 1–2 (at ATP Tour level, Grand Slam level, and in Davis Cup)
- Career titles: 9 ITFs
- Highest ranking: No. 253 (9 November 2026)
- Current ranking: No. 253 (9 November 2026)

Grand Slam singles results
- Wimbledon: 2R (2025)

Doubles
- Career record: 0–0 (at ATP Tour level, Grand Slam level, and in Davis Cup)
- Career titles: 0
- Highest ranking: No. 2,366 (19 May 2025)
- Last updated on: 9 November 2026.

Oliver Tarvet (born 29 October 2003) is a British professional tennis player. He has a career-high ATP singles ranking of world No. 253 achieved on 9 November 2026 and a doubles ranking of No. 2,366 achieved on 19 May 2025.

== Early life ==
Tarvet was born in 2003 in St Albans, Hertfordshire, the son of Garry Tarvet, a construction manager, and Jennifer Tarvet, a teacher. He has one sister Joanna Tarvet. Tarvet trained as a youngster at Batchwood Tennis Academy and attended Marlborough Science Academy, a state school in St Albans between 2015 and 2020. Tarvet was homeschooled during his A-levels, and played tennis at Unique Tennis London.

== Coach ==
Tarvet is coached by Alex Funkhouser, the Associate Head Coach at the University of San Diego.

== Personal life ==
Tarvet stated in 2025 that he prefers to be called Ollie. He said "I usually only get called Oliver when my mum is annoyed at me. So you know, I try to avoid it at all costs".

== Career ==
=== College Years ===
From 2022-2026, Tarvet spent four years at University of San Diego, competing for San Diego Toreros. His personal honours included being named an ITA Singles All-American Championships Title Winner four years in a row, making him the most decorated player in the program's history. Tarvet studied for a communications and marketing degree.

=== 2025-2026: Wimbledon debut and first win ===
In June 2025, ranked No. 719 Tarvet was awarded a wildcard into the men's singles qualifying event at the 2025 Wimbledon Championships, and in the first round recorded a straight sets win over 14th seed Térence Atmane. In the second round he defeated Alexis Galarneau, again in straight sets, before defeating Alexander Blockx to earn his debut appearance at a Grand Slam. Tarvet recorded his first ATP and also major win, defeating fellow qualifier Leandro Riedi in the first round. He was defeated in straight sets by defending champion, and world No. 2, Carlos Alcaraz in the second round. Tarvet had to forgo the majority of his £99,000 prize money in order to maintain his status as an amateur college athlete.

=== 2026: Second Wimbledon, Maiden Challenger title ===
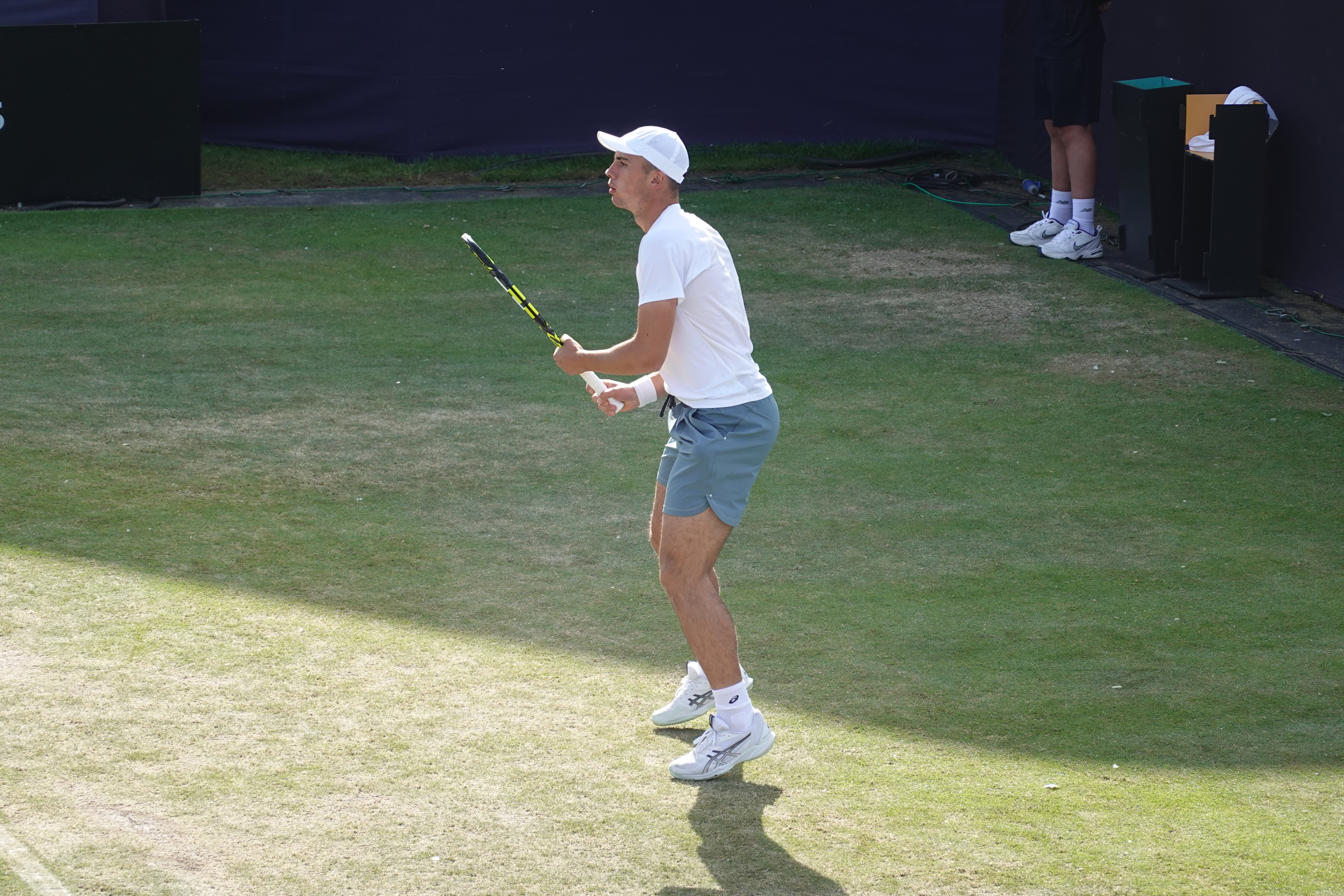
Tarvet playing at the 2026 Ilkley Open.

Tarvet turned professional after graduating from the University of San Diego.

Tarvet, ranked 344, was again awarded a wildcard into the qualifying event at Wimbledon. He recorded wins over Alex Bolt, Alexis Galarneau, and Stefanos Sakellaridis to qualify to the main draw. This made him only the third British player in history to qualify for Wimbledon in back to back years. Tarvet did not lose a set in qualifying. In the main draw, he lost to 24th seed Arthur Rinderknech in the first round.

After Wimbledon, Tarvet won a M25 tournament in Aldershot and then claimed his maiden Challenger title at the Roehampton Challenger, defeating Lucas Poullain in the final.

== Performance timeline ==
Key
W	F	SF	QF	#R	RR	Q#	DNQ	A	NH

(W) winner; (F) finalist; (SF) semifinalist; (QF) quarterfinalist; (#R) rounds 4, 3, 2, 1; (RR) round-robin stage; (Q#) qualification round; (DNQ) did not qualify; (A) absent; (NH) not held; (SR) strike rate (events won / competed); (W–L) win–loss record.

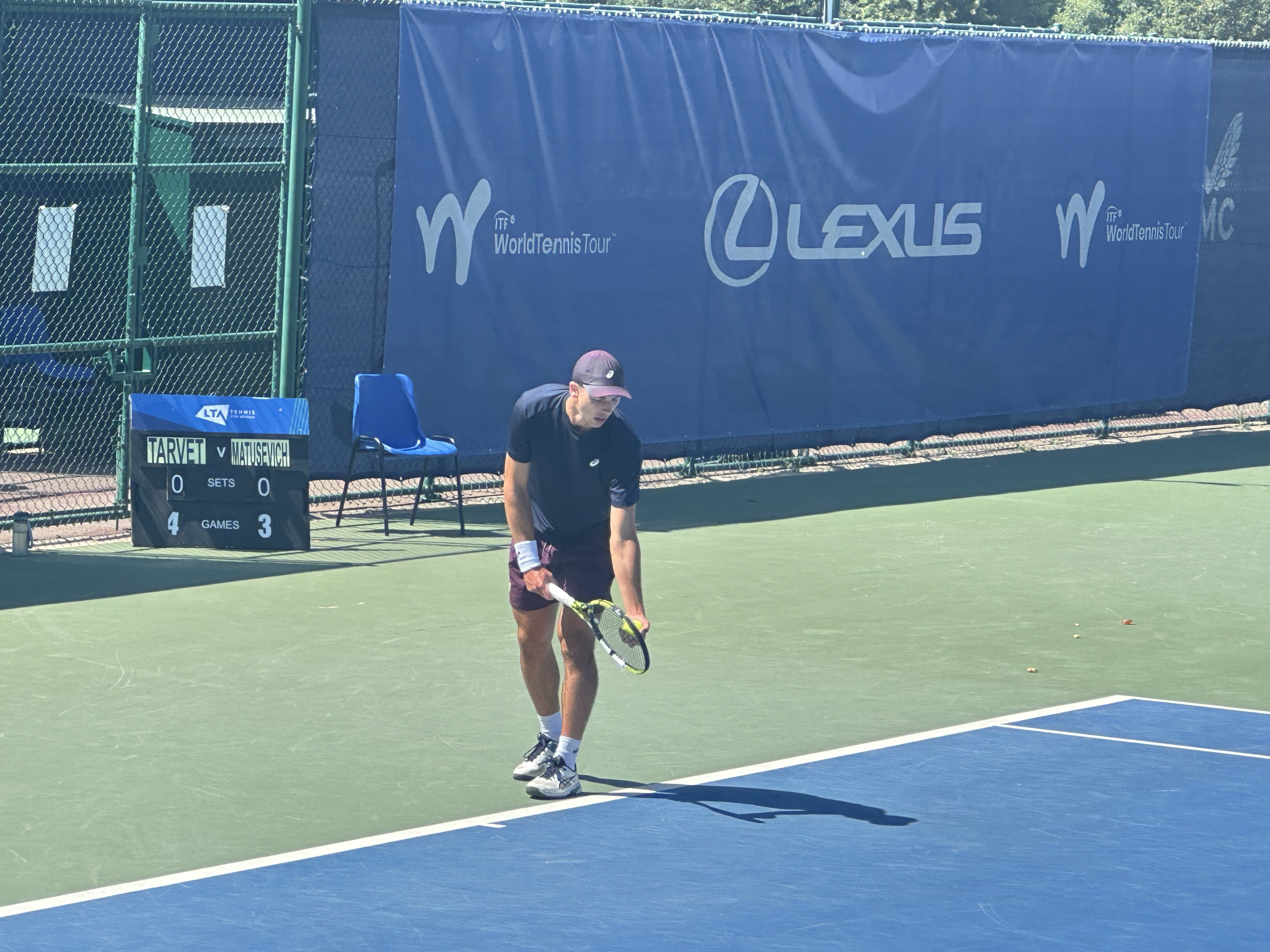
Oliver Tarvet playing in the men's semi-final at the M25 tournament in Roehampton

=== Singles ===
Tournament	2025	2026	SR	W–L	Win%
Grand Slam tournaments
Australian Open	A	A	0 / 0	0–0	–
French Open	A	A	0 / 0	0–0	–
Wimbledon	2R	1R	0 / 2	1–2	33%
US Open	A		0 / 0	0–0	–
Win–loss	1–1	0–1	0 / 2	1–2	33%

== ATP Challenger Tour finals ==
=== Singles: 1 (1 title) ===
Legend ATP Challenger Tour (1–0)	Finals by surface Hard (1–0)

Result	W–L	Date	Tournament	Tier	Surface	Opponent	Score
Win	1–0	Aug 2026	Roehampton Challenger, United Kingdom	Challenger	Hard	(France) Lucas Poullain	6–3, 6–2

== ITF World Tennis Tour finals ==
=== Singles: 9 (9 titles, 1 runner-up) ===
Legend ITF WTT (9-1)	Finals by surface Hard (9-1) Clay (0–0)

Result	W–L	Date	Tournament	Tier	Surface	Opponent	Score
Win	1–0	Jun 2023	M15 Monastir, Tunisia	WTT	Hard	Igor Kudriashov	6–1, 6–1
Win	2–0	Dec 2023	M15 Monastir, Tunisia	WTT	Hard	(Japan) Ryotaro Taguchi	4–6, 6–3, 6–1
Win	3–0	Jun 2024	M15 San Diego, US	WTT	Hard	(United States) Nathan Ponwith	4–6, 6–3, 6–4
Win	4–0	Aug 2024	M15 Monastir, Tunisia	WTT	Hard	(Ivory Coast) Eliakim Coulibaly	6–7^{(4–7)}, 6–4, 6–1
Win	5–0	Jun 2025	M15 San Diego, US	WTT	Hard	(Japan) Leo Vithoontien	6–0, 6–0
Win	6–0	Aug 2025	M25 Roehampton, UK	WTT	Hard	(United Kingdom) Paul Jubb	4–6, 7–5, 6–1
Win	7–0	Jul 2026	M25 Aldershot, UK	WTT	Hard	(United Kingdom) Emile Hudd	6–1, 6–3
Loss	7–1	Aug 2026	M25 Roehampton, UK	WTT	Hard	(United Kingdom) Charles Broom	3–6, 2–6
Win	8-1	Oct 2026	M25 Redbridge, UK	WTT	Hard	(United Kingdom) Paul Jubb	6–4, 5-7, 6-2
Win	9-1	Oct 2026	M25 Sheffield, UK	WTT	Hard	(France) Matt Ponchet	6–0, 6-0
