= Matthew Summers =

British tennis player (born 1998)

- Country (sports): United Kingdom
- Born: 25 September 1998 (age 28) Maidstone, United Kingdom
- Height: 1.80 m (5 ft 11 in)
- Plays: Left-handed (one-handed backhand)
- College: Denver
- Coach: James Davis
- Prize money: US $46,182

Singles
- Career record: 0–0 (at ATP Tour level, Grand Slam level, and in Davis Cup)
- Career titles: 0
- Highest ranking: No. 691 (3 November 2025)
- Current ranking: No. 1,283 (9 November 2026)

Doubles
- Career record: 0–0 (at ATP Tour level, Grand Slam level, and in Davis Cup)
- Career titles: 3 ATP Challenger, 8 ITF
- Highest ranking: No. 210 (9 November 2026)
- Current ranking: No. 210 (9 November 2026)
- Last updated on: 9 November 2026.

Matthew Summers (born 25 September 1998) is a British tennis player. Summers has a career high ATP singles ranking of No. 691 achieved on 3 November 2025 and a career high ATP doubles ranking of No. 210 achieved on 9 November 2026.

Teaming up with Tom Hands, Summers has won three ATP Challenger doubles titles, at the 2026 Lexus Nottingham Challenger II, 2026 Roehampton Challenger and 2026 Roehampton Challenger II.

Summers played college tennis at Denver.
