= Tom Hands =

British tennis player (born 1996)

- Country (sports): United Kingdom
- Born: 2 November 1996 (age 30) Cambridge, England
- Height: 1.85 m (6 ft 1 in)
- Plays: Right-handed (two-handed backhand)
- Prize money: US $46,429

Singles
- Career record: 0–0 (at ATP Tour level, Grand Slam level, and in Davis Cup)
- Career titles: 0
- Highest ranking: No. 1,210 (13 July 2026)

Doubles
- Career record: 0–0 (at ATP Tour level, Grand Slam level, and in Davis Cup)
- Career titles: 3 ATP Challenger, 6 ITF
- Highest ranking: No. 165 (9 November 2026)
- Current ranking: No. 165 (9 November 2026)
- Last updated on: 9 November 2026.

Tom Hands (born 2 November 1996) is a British tennis player. Hands has a career high ATP singles ranking of No. 1,210 achieved on 14 July 2025 and a career high ATP doubles ranking of No. 165 achieved on 9 November 2026.

Teaming up with Matthew Summers, Hands has won three ATP Challenger doubles titles, at the 2026 Lexus Nottingham Challenger II, 2026 Roehampton Challenger and 2026 Roehampton Challenger II.
