= 2024 Cassis Open Provence – Doubles =

Doubles
- 2024 Cassis Open Provence

Final
- Champions: (Portugal) Jaime Faria (Portugal) Henrique Rocha
- Runners-up: (France) Manuel Guinard (France) Matteo Martineau
- Score: 7–6^{(7–5)}, 6–4

Events
Singles	Doubles
← 2023 ·	Cassis Open Provence	· 2025 →

Dan Added and Jonathan Eysseric were the defending champions but only Added chose to defend his title, partnering Arthur Reymond. They lost in the quarterfinals to Jaime Faria and Henrique Rocha.

Faria and Rocha won the title after defeating Manuel Guinard and Matteo Martineau 7–6^{(7–5)}, 6–4 in the final.

== Seeds ==
1. (India) Anirudh Chandrasekar / (India) Niki Kaliyanda Poonacha (semifinals)
2. (France) Manuel Guinard / (France) Matteo Martineau (final)
3. (Portugal) Jaime Faria / (Portugal) Henrique Rocha (champions)
4. (France) Antoine Escoffier / (France) Luca Sanchez (quarterfinals)

== Draw ==
=== Key ===
- Q = Qualifier
- WC = Wild card
- LL = Lucky loser
- Alt = Alternate
- ITF = ITF entry
- PR = Protected ranking
- SR = Special ranking
- SE = Special exempt
- JE = Junior exempt
- JR = Junior Accelerator Programme entrant
- CO = College Accelerator Programme entrant
- NG = Next Gen Accelerator Program entrant
- w/o = Walkover
- r = Retired
- d = Defaulted

=== Draw ===
First round
WC	(France) Paul Ambrosino (France) David Couronne	2	0
(Peru) A Huertas del Pino (Peru) C Huertas del Pino	6	6
3	(Portugal) J Faria (Portugal) H Rocha	6	6
(Israel) D Cukierman (Israel) R Stepanov	3	2
(France) C Bittoun Kouzmine (Italy) Augusto Virgili	4	5
(Austria) D Pichler (Austria) J Rodionov	6	7
(France) R Bertrand (Syria) H Naw	4	0
4	(France) A Escoffier (France) L Sanchez	6	6
(India) S Banthia (Spain) B Pujol Navarro	6	6
(France) Fabien Salle (Colombia) A Soriano Barrera	4	4
WC	(France) Hugo Cardinaud (France) Pierre Antoine Tailleu	2	1
2	(France) M Guinard (France) M Martineau	6	6

Quarterfinals
1	(India) A Chandrasekar (India) N Kaliyanda Poonacha	7^{7}	7^{7}
(Peru) A Huertas del Pino (Peru) C Huertas del Pino	6^{3}	6^{4}
3	(Portugal) J Faria (Portugal) H Rocha	6	6
(France) D Added (France) A Reymond	3	3
(Austria) D Pichler (Austria) J Rodionov	6	7^{9}
4	(France) A Escoffier (France) L Sanchez	3	6^{7}
(India) S Banthia (Spain) B Pujol Navarro	3	4
2	(France) M Guinard (France) M Martineau	6	6

Semifinals
1	(India) A Chandrasekar (India) N Kaliyanda Poonacha	4	7^{7}	[6]
3	(Portugal) J Faria (Portugal) H Rocha	6	6^{2}	[10]
(Austria) D Pichler (Austria) J Rodionov	6	5	[7]
2	(France) M Guinard (France) M Martineau	3	7	[10]

Final
3	(Portugal) J Faria (Portugal) H Rocha	7^{7}	6
2	(France) M Guinard (France) M Martineau	6^{5}	4
