= 2022 Cassis Open Provence – Singles =

Singles
- 2022 Cassis Open Provence

Final
- Champion: (France) Hugo Grenier
- Runner-up: (Australia) James Duckworth
- Score: 7–5, 6–4

Events
Singles	Doubles
← 2021 ·	Cassis Open Provence	· 2023 →

Benjamin Bonzi was the defending champion but chose not to defend his title.

Hugo Grenier won the title after defeating James Duckworth 7–5, 6–4 in the final.

== Seeds ==
1. (France) Constant Lestienne (quarterfinals)
2. (Australia) James Duckworth (final)
3. (France) Hugo Grenier (champion)
4. (Czech Republic) Tomáš Macháč (semifinals)
5. (Germany) Jan-Lennard Struff (second round)
6. (United Kingdom) Ryan Peniston (second round)
7. (Hungary) Zsombor Piros (quarterfinals)
8. (Japan) Kaichi Uchida (quarterfinals)

== Draw ==
=== Key ===
- Q = Qualifier
- WC = Wild card
- LL = Lucky loser
- Alt = Alternate
- SE = Special exempt
- PR = Protected ranking
- ITF = ITF entry
- JE = Junior exempt
- w/o = Walkover
- r = Retired
- d = Defaulted
- SR = Special ranking

=== Finals ===
Semifinals
(Italy) Francesco Maestrelli	3	4
3	(France) Hugo Grenier	6	6
4	(Czech Republic) Tomáš Macháč	3	4
2	(Australia) James Duckworth	6	6

Final
3	(France) Hugo Grenier	7	6
2	(Australia) James Duckworth	5	4

=== Top half ===
First round
1	(France) C Lestienne	7	6
(Serbia) H Međedović	5	3
(France) A Escoffier	6^{5}	7	4
WC	(France) S Gueymard Wayenburg	7^{7}	5	6
(Italy) F Maestrelli	6	7^{7}
Q	(France) R Bertrand	2	6^{3}
(Poland) K Żuk	3	2
6	(United Kingdom) R Peniston	6	6
3	(France) H Grenier	6	6
Q	(France) M Martineau	1	4
(France) L Lokoli	6	7
(United Kingdom) J Clarke	3	5
(France) E Furness	7^{7}	7
Alt	(France) C Tabur	6^{5}	5
WC	(France) C Chidekh	6	3	4
8	(Japan) K Uchida	4	6	6

Second round
1	(France) C Lestienne	6	7^{7}
WC	(France) S Gueymard Wayenburg	4	6^{3}
(Italy) F Maestrelli	4	7	6
6	(United Kingdom) R Peniston	6	5	1
3	(France) H Grenier	6	4	7^{7}
(France) L Lokoli	3	6	6^{5}
(France) E Furness	4	1
8	(Japan) K Uchida	6	6

Quarterfinals
1	(France) C Lestienne	6	6^{0}	3
(Italy) F Maestrelli	3	7^{7}	6
3	(France) H Grenier	6	7^{7}
8	(Japan) K Uchida	4	6^{5}

Semifinals
(Italy) F Maestrelli	3	4
3	(France) H Grenier	6	6

=== Bottom half ===
First round
7	(Hungary) Z Piros	6	6
Q	(France) K de Schepper	4	3
Q	(France) T Atmane	6	7^{7}
(Brazil) M Pucinelli de Almeida	1	6^{4}
Q	(Brazil) T Bellucci	4	3
Alt	(Japan) H Moriya	6	6
(Belgium) M Geerts	2	3
4	(Czech Republic) T Macháč	6	6
5	(Germany) J-L Struff	3	7^{7}	6
Alt	(Tunisia) S Mansouri	6	6^{5}	3
(Croatia) B Gojo	6^{5}	6	7^{7}
(Turkey) A Çelikbilek	7^{7}	0	6^{4}
WC	(France) G Debru	6	6
Q	(France) A Olivetti	4	3
(Switzerland) A Bellier	4	6	2
2	(Australia) J Duckworth	6	2	6

Second round
7	(Hungary) Z Piros	1	6	6
Q	(France) T Atmane	6	4	3
Alt	(Japan) H Moriya	6	4	3
4	(Czech Republic) T Macháč	2	6	6
5	(Germany) J-L Struff	7	3	6^{6}
(Croatia) B Gojo	5	6	7^{8}
WC	(France) G Debru	6^{4}	4
2	(Australia) J Duckworth	7^{7}	6

Quarterfinals
7	(Hungary) Z Piros	6	6^{5}	1
4	(Czech Republic) T Macháč	4	7^{7}	6
(Croatia) B Gojo	3	6	4
2	(Australia) J Duckworth	6	3	6

Semifinals
4	(Czech Republic) T Macháč	3	4
2	(Australia) J Duckworth	6	6
