= 2019 Cassis Open Provence – Doubles =

Doubles
- 2019 Cassis Open Provence

Final
- Champions: (Sweden) André Göransson (Netherlands) Sem Verbeek
- Runners-up: (Netherlands) Sander Arends (Netherlands) David Pel
- Score: 7–6^{(8–6)}, 4–6, [11–9]

Events
Singles	Doubles
← 2018 ·	Cassis Open Provence	· 2021 →

Matt Reid and Sergiy Stakhovsky were the defending champions but chose not to defend their title.

André Göransson and Sem Verbeek won the title after defeating Sander Arends and David Pel 7–6^{(8–6)}, 4–6, [11–9] in the final.

== Seeds ==
1. (Netherlands) Sander Arends / (Netherlands) David Pel (final)
2. (Sweden) André Göransson / (Netherlands) Sem Verbeek (champions)
3. (Philippines) Ruben Gonzales / (Sweden) Andreas Siljeström (first round)
4. (Croatia) Ivan Sabanov / (Croatia) Matej Sabanov (first round)

== Draw ==
=== Key ===
- Q = Qualifier
- WC = Wild card
- LL = Lucky loser
- Alt = Alternate
- SE = Special exempt
- PR = Protected ranking
- ITF = ITF entry
- JE = Junior exempt
- w/o = Walkover
- r = Retired
- d = Defaulted
- SR = Special ranking

First round
1	(Netherlands) S Arends (Netherlands) D Pel	7	7
(Sweden) M Eriksson (Kazakhstan) D Popko	5	5
WC	(France) Florian Moret (France) Joris Moret	2	4
WC	(France) Tony Bourcet (France) A Escoffier	6	6
4	(Croatia) I Sabanov (Croatia) M Sabanov	4	1
(Russia) E Karlovskiy (India) R Ramanathan	6	6
(Colombia) S Giraldo (Belarus) I Ivashka	3	2
(France) Q Halys (France) T Lamasine	6	6
(Kazakhstan) A Golubev (Kazakhstan) A Nedovyesov	6	6
(Norway) V Durasovic (Switzerland) M-A Hüsler	4	4
(Finland) H Heliövaara (Austria) J Rodionov	6	7^{7}
3	(Philippines) R Gonzales (Sweden) A Siljeström	4	6^{2}
(Croatia) T Draganja (Belarus) U Ignatik	7^{9}	6^{4}	[9]
WC	(France) M Martineau (France) C Moutet	6^{7}	7^{7}	[11]
(Italy) A Arnaboldi (Switzerland) L Margaroli	2	3
2	(Sweden) A Göransson (Netherlands) S Verbeek	6	6

Quarterfinals
1	(Netherlands) S Arends (Netherlands) D Pel	6	6
WC	(France) T Bourcet (France) A Escoffier	3	2
(Russia) E Karlovskiy (India) R Ramanathan	3	2
(France) Q Halys (France) T Lamasine	6	6
(Kazakhstan) A Golubev (Kazakhstan) A Nedovyesov	6	6
(Finland) H Heliövaara (Austria) J Rodionov	4	4
WC	(France) M Martineau (France) C Moutet
2	(Sweden) A Göransson (Netherlands) S Verbeek	w/o

Semifinals
1	(Netherlands) S Arends (Netherlands) D Pel	7^{7}	7
(France) Q Halys (France) T Lamasine	6^{5}	5
(Kazakhstan) A Golubev (Kazakhstan) A Nedovyesov	3	2
2	(Sweden) A Göransson (Netherlands) S Verbeek	6	6

Final
1	(Netherlands) S Arends (Netherlands) D Pel	6^{6}	6	[9]
2	(Sweden) A Göransson (Netherlands) S Verbeek	7^{8}	4	[11]
