= 2022 Cassis Open Provence – Doubles =

Doubles
- 2022 Cassis Open Provence

Final
- Champions: (Belgium) Michael Geerts (Belgium) Joran Vliegen
- Runners-up: (Monaco) Romain Arneodo (France) Albano Olivetti
- Score: 6–4, 7–6^{(8–6)}

Events
Singles	Doubles
← 2021 ·	Cassis Open Provence	· 2023 →

Sriram Balaji and Ramkumar Ramanathan were the defending champions but chose not to defend their title.

Michael Geerts and Joran Vliegen won the title after defeating Romain Arneodo and Albano Olivetti 6–4, 7–6^{(8–6)} in the final.

== Seeds ==
1. (Monaco) Romain Arneodo / (France) Albano Olivetti (final)
2. (Netherlands) David Pel / (Poland) Szymon Walków (first round)
3. (India) Yuki Bhambri / (India) Saketh Myneni (semifinals)
4. (Romania) Victor Vlad Cornea / (New Zealand) Artem Sitak (semifinals)

== Draw ==
=== Key ===
- Q = Qualifier
- WC = Wild card
- LL = Lucky loser
- Alt = Alternate
- ITF = ITF entry
- PR = Protected ranking
- SR = Special ranking
- SE = Special exempt
- JE = Junior exempt
- JR = Junior Accelerator Programme entrant
- CO = College Accelerator Programme entrant
- NG = Next Gen Accelerator Program entrant
- w/o = Walkover
- r = Retired
- d = Defaulted

First round
1	(Monaco) R Arneodo (France) A Olivetti	6	3	[10]
(France) C Hemery (France) F Reboul	3	6	[7]
(Finland) E Vasa (United Kingdom) M Whitehouse	6	4	[7]
(Bulgaria) A Donski (Bulgaria) A Lazarov	3	6	[10]
3	(India) Y Bhambri (India) S Myneni	7^{7}	6
(Australia) J Taylor (Australia) B Walkin	6^{4}	2
WC	(France) G Debru (France) M Martineau	2	6^{8}
(India) A Kadhe (India) D Sharan	6	7^{10}
(Sweden) F Bergevi (Greece) Pe Tsitsipas	6	2	[14]
(Czech Republic) M Gengel (Czech Republic) L Rosol	4	6	[12]
(Brazil) M Pucinelli de Almeida (Brazil) F Romboli	7^{7}	4	[8]
4	(Romania) VV Cornea (New Zealand) A Sitak	6^{3}	6	[10]
(Belgium) M Geerts (Belgium) J Vliegen	6	6
WC	(France) R Bertrand (Ukraine) V Uzhylovskyi	3	4
(United Kingdom) L Johnson (Tunisia) S Mansouri	6	6
2	(Netherlands) D Pel (Poland) S Walków	3	4

Quarterfinals
1	(Monaco) R Arneodo (France) A Olivetti	6	7
(Bulgaria) A Donski (Bulgaria) A Lazarov	4	5
3	(India) Y Bhambri (India) S Myneni	6	3	[10]
(India) A Kadhe (India) D Sharan	3	6	[6]
(Sweden) F Bergevi (Greece) Pe Tsitsipas	6^{7}	6	[3]
4	(Romania) VV Cornea (New Zealand) A Sitak	7^{9}	3	[10]
(Belgium) M Geerts (Belgium) J Vliegen	7^{7}	6
(United Kingdom) L Johnson (Tunisia) S Mansouri	6^{4}	3

Semifinals
1	(Monaco) R Arneodo (France) A Olivetti	6	4	[10]
3	(India) Y Bhambri (India) S Myneni	3	6	[8]
4	(Romania) VV Cornea (New Zealand) A Sitak	6^{4}	1
(Belgium) M Geerts (Belgium) J Vliegen	7^{7}	6

Final
1	(Monaco) R Arneodo (France) A Olivetti	4	6^{6}
(Belgium) M Geerts (Belgium) J Vliegen	6	7^{8}
