= 2025 Cassis Open Provence =

- Date: 1–7 September
- Edition: 7th
- Surface: Hard
- Location: Cassis, France

Champions

Singles
- (United Kingdom) Billy Harris

Doubles
- (Austria) David Pichler / (Austria) Jurij Rodionov
← 2024 ·	Cassis Open Provence	· 2026 →

The 2025 Cassis Open Provence was a professional tennis tournament played on hard courts. It was the seventh edition of the tournament which was part of the 2025 ATP Challenger Tour. It took place in Cassis, France between 1 and 7 September 2025.

== Singles main-draw entrants ==
=== Seeds ===
Country	Player	Rank^{1}	Seed
FRA	Quentin Halys	70	1
EST	Mark Lajal	147	2
GBR	Billy Harris	151	3
AUT	Jurij Rodionov	154	4
FRA	Titouan Droguet	159	5
KAZ	Timofey Skatov	192	6
FRA	Sascha Gueymard Wayenburg	206	7
MON	Valentin Vacherot	216	8

- ^{1} Rankings are as of 25 August 2025.

=== Other entrants ===
The following players received wildcards into the singles main draw:

- (France) Étienne Donnet
- (France) Maé Malige
- (France) Benoît Paire

The following player received entry into the singles main draw through the Next Gen Accelerator programme:

- (India) ~~Aryan Shah~~

The following players received entry into the singles main draw as alternates:

- (Estonia) Daniil Glinka
- (Sweden) Olle Wallin

The following players received entry from the qualifying draw:

- (France) Kenny de Schepper
- (Germany) Justin Engel
- (France) Maxime Janvier
- (Switzerland) Jakub Paul
- (Poland) Olaf Pieczkowski
- (United Kingdom) Hamish Stewart

The following player received entry as a lucky loser:

- (Italy) Filippo Moroni

== Champions ==
=== Singles ===
- (United Kingdom) Billy Harris def. (Estonia) Daniil Glinka 3–6, 7–5, 6–3.

=== Doubles ===
- (Austria) David Pichler / (Austria) Jurij Rodionov def. (France) Arthur Reymond / (France) Luca Sanchez 7–6^{(7–2)}, 6–4.
