= 2018 Cassis Open Provence – Singles =

Singles
- 2018 Cassis Open Provence

Final
- Champion: (France) Enzo Couacaud
- Runner-up: (France) Ugo Humbert
- Score: 6–2, 6–3

Events
Singles	Doubles
- Cassis Open Provence

This was the first edition of the tournament.

Enzo Couacaud won the title after defeating Ugo Humbert 6–2, 6–3 in the final.

== Seeds ==
1. (Lithuania) Ričardas Berankis (first round)
2. (France) Corentin Moutet (first round)
3. (Spain) Adrián Menéndez Maceiras (semifinals)
4. (Ukraine) Sergiy Stakhovsky (first round)
5. (France) Ugo Humbert (final)
6. (Australia) Bernard Tomic (first round)
7. (France) Grégoire Barrère (first round)
8. (Germany) Mats Moraing (second round, retired)

== Draw ==
Key

- Q = Qualifier
- WC = Wild card
- LL = Lucky loser
- Alt = Alternate
- ITF = ITF entry
- PR = Protected ranking
- SR = Special ranking
- SE = Special exempt
- JE = Junior exempt
- JR = Junior Accelerator Programme entrant
- CO = College Accelerator Programme entrant
- NG = Next Gen Accelerator Program entrant
- w/o = Walkover
- r = Retired
- d = Defaulted

=== Finals ===
Semifinals
Q	(France) Enzo Couacaud	6	6
3	(Spain) Adrián Menéndez Maceiras	4	4
(United Kingdom) James Ward	6^{3}	4
5	(France) Ugo Humbert	7^{7}	6

Final
Q	(France) Enzo Couacaud	6	6
5	(France) Ugo Humbert	2	3

=== Top half ===
First round
1	(Lithuania) R Berankis	7^{7}	3	4
Q	(France) E Couacaud	6^{5}	6	6
(Portugal) G Oliveira	3	1
(Germany) M Bachinger	6	6
(Netherlands) S Griekspoor	6	6
(Russia) E Karlovskiy	4	4
(Slovakia) N Gombos	6^{6}	5
8	(Germany) M Moraing	7^{8}	7
3	(Spain) A Menéndez Maceiras	7^{9}	6
WC	(France) A Rinderknech	6^{7}	3
WC	(France) A Müller	6	6
Q	(United Kingdom) D Evans	3	4
WC	(France) E Benchetrit	6	6
Q	(France) TK Wang	1	4
(France) A Hoang	3	7^{7}	7
7	(France) G Barrère	6	6^{2}	5

Second round
Q	(France) E Couacaud	6	6
(Germany) M Bachinger	4	3
(Netherlands) S Griekspoor	6
8	(Germany) M Moraing	5^{r}
3	(Spain) A Menéndez Maceiras	6	7
WC	(France) A Müller	2	5
WC	(France) E Benchetrit	4	7^{7}	1
(France) A Hoang	6	6^{5}	6

Quarterfinals
Q	(France) E Couacaud	3	6	6
(Netherlands) S Griekspoor	6	4	1
3	(Spain) A Menéndez Maceiras	6	6^{5}	6
(France) A Hoang	2	7^{7}	3

Semifinals
Q	(France) E Couacaud	6	6
3	(Spain) A Menéndez Maceiras	4	4

=== Bottom half ===
First round
6	(Australia) B Tomic	7^{7}	5	5
(Netherlands) T Griekspoor	6^{5}	7	7
(Serbia) N Milojević	4	7	4
(United Kingdom) J Ward	6	5	6
(Spain) O Roca Batalla	6	6
Q	(France) Jonathan Kanar	3	4
(Germany) O Otte	7^{7}	3	7
4	(Ukraine) S Stakhovsky	6^{2}	6	5
5	(France) U Humbert	7^{7}	6
(Turkey) C İlkel	6^{5}	4
(Germany) T Kamke	7	6
(Kazakhstan) A Nedovyesov	5	4
WC	(France) M Bourgue	7^{7}	1
(Czech Republic) V Šafránek	6^{5}	0^{r}
(France) Q Halys	7^{7}	6
2	(France) C Moutet	6^{4}	4

Second round
(Netherlands) T Griekspoor	6^{1}	6	3
(United Kingdom) J Ward	7^{7}	3	6
(Spain) O Roca Batalla	3	4
(Germany) O Otte	6	6
5	(France) U Humbert	6	7^{7}
(Germany) T Kamke	4	6^{4}
WC	(France) M Bourgue	6	6
(France) Q Halys	0	4

Quarterfinals
(United Kingdom) J Ward	7^{9}	3	6
(Germany) O Otte	6^{7}	6	3
5	(France) U Humbert	6	6
WC	(France) M Bourgue	3	3

Semifinals
(United Kingdom) J Ward	6^{3}	4
5	(France) U Humbert	7^{7}	6
