= 2026 Cassis Open Provence – Doubles =

Doubles
- 2026 Cassis Open Provence

Final
- Champions: (France) Dan Added (Germany) Daniel Masur
- Runners-up: (United Kingdom) Tom Hands (United Kingdom) Matthew Summers
- Score: 6–4, 6–2

Events
| Singles | Doubles |
- Cassis Open Provence

David Pichler and Jurij Rodionov were the defending champions but chose not to defend their title.

Dan Added and Daniel Masur won the title after defeating Tom Hands and Matthew Summers 6–4, 6–2 in the final.

== Seeds ==
1. (Australia) Thomas Fancutt / (Japan) Seita Watanabe (semifinals)
2. (United Kingdom) Tom Hands / (United Kingdom) Matthew Summers (final)
3. (France) Dan Added / (Germany) Daniel Masur (champions)
4. (United States) Zachary Fuchs / (Venezuela) Brandon Pérez (semifinals)

== Draw ==
Key

- Q = Qualifier
- WC = Wild card
- LL = Lucky loser
- Alt = Alternate
- ITF = ITF entry
- PR = Protected ranking
- SR = Special ranking
- SE = Special exempt
- JE = Junior exempt
- JR = Junior Accelerator Programme entrant
- CO = College Accelerator Programme entrant
- NG = Next Gen Accelerator Program entrant
- w/o = Walkover
- r = Retired
- d = Defaulted

First round
1 | (Australia) T Fancutt (Japan) S Watanabe | 6 | 7^{7}
(Italy) Matteo Covato (United States) Gray Voelzke | 2 | 6^{4}
(France) R Bertrand (Colombia) A Soriano Barrera | 6 | 7
(Sweden) Oliver Johansson (India) A Kalyanpur | 3 | 5
3 | (France) D Added (Germany) D Masur | 6 | 6
WC | (France) Paul Ambrosino (France) Thibaut Magand | 0 | 1
(France) F Balshaw (France) M Martineau | 6 | 7
(Finland) O Paldanius (Ukraine) V Uzhylovskyi | 1 | 5
(France) Mathieu Scaglia (France) Nicolas Tepmahc | 6^{2} | 7 | [8]
(Canada) J Boulais (France) Guillaume Dalmasso | 7^{7} | 5 | [10]
Alt | (France) M Janvier (France) Victor Paganetti | 2 | 2
4 | (United States) Zachary Fuchs (Venezuela) B Pérez | 6 | 6
PR | (Zimbabwe) B Lock (Zimbabwe) CJ Lock | 6 | 6
WC | (France) Matis Roche (France) Pierre Antoine Tailleu | 4 | 2
(Monaco) R Arneodo (France) U Blanchet | 6^{5} | 4
2 | (United Kingdom) T Hands (United Kingdom) M Summers | 7^{7} | 6

Quarterfinals
1 | (Australia) T Fancutt (Japan) S Watanabe | 4 | 7^{7} | [12]
(France) R Bertrand (Colombia) A Soriano Barrera | 6 | 6^{3} | [10]
3 | (France) D Added (Germany) D Masur | 5 | 7 | [10]
(France) F Balshaw (France) M Martineau | 7 | 5 | [7]
(Canada) J Boulais (France) G Dalmasso | 6^{3} | 7^{7} | [7]
4 | (United States) Z Fuchs (Venezuela) B Pérez | 7^{7} | 6^{3} | [10]
PR | (Zimbabwe) B Lock (Zimbabwe) CJ Lock | 2 | 4
2 | (United Kingdom) T Hands (United Kingdom) M Summers | 6 | 6

Semifinals
1 | (Australia) T Fancutt (Japan) S Watanabe | 4 | 2
3 | (France) D Added (Germany) D Masur | 6 | 6
4 | (United States) Z Fuchs (Venezuela) B Pérez | 2 | 7^{7} | [3]
2 | (United Kingdom) T Hands (United Kingdom) M Summers | 6 | 6^{4} | [10]

Final
3 | (France) D Added (Germany) D Masur | 6 | 6
2 | (United Kingdom) T Hands (United Kingdom) M Summers | 4 | 2
