= 2019 Cassis Open Provence =

- Date: 2–8 September
- Edition: 2nd
- Surface: Hard
- Location: Cassis, France

Champions

Singles
- (France) Jo-Wilfried Tsonga

Doubles
- (Sweden) André Göransson / (Netherlands) Sem Verbeek
← 2018 ·	Cassis Open Provence	· 2021 →

The 2019 Cassis Open Provence was a professional tennis tournament played on hard courts. It was the 2nd edition of the tournament which was part of the 2019 ATP Challenger Tour. It took place in Cassis, France between 2 and 8 September 2019.

== Singles main-draw entrants ==
=== Seeds ===
Country	Player	Rank^{1}	Seed
FRA	Jo-Wilfried Tsonga	65	1
FRA	Corentin Moutet	82	2
TUN	Malek Jaziri	103	3
FRA	Antoine Hoang	104	4
SWE	Mikael Ymer	107	5
GER	Yannick Maden	121	6
BLR	Ilya Ivashka	144	7
UKR	Sergiy Stakhovsky	147	8
CZE	Lukáš Rosol	152	9
FRA	Quentin Halys	161	10
ISR	Dudi Sela	166	11
IND	Ramkumar Ramanathan	177	12
GBR	Jay Clarke	187	13
FIN	Emil Ruusuvuori	209	14
KAZ	Aleksandr Nedovyesov	226	15
FRA	Gleb Sakharov	228	16

- ^{1} Rankings are as of 26 August 2019.

=== Other entrants ===
The following players received wildcards into the singles main draw:

- (France) Vivien Cabos
- (Belarus) Ilya Ivashka
- (France) Corentin Moutet
- (France) Rayane Roumane
- (France) Jo-Wilfried Tsonga

The following player received entry into the singles main draw using a protected ranking:

- (Austria) Maximilian Neuchrist

The following players received entry into the singles main draw as alternates:

- (Finland) Harri Heliövaara
- (Switzerland) Luca Margaroli
- (Spain) Jaume Pla Malfeito
- (Israel) Yoav Schab
- (Netherlands) Sem Verbeek

== Champions ==
=== Singles ===
- (France) Jo-Wilfried Tsonga def. (Israel) Dudi Sela 6–1, 6–0.

=== Doubles ===
- (Sweden) André Göransson / (Netherlands) Sem Verbeek def. (Netherlands) Sander Arends / (Netherlands) David Pel 7–6^{(8–6)}, 4–6, [11–9].
