= 2026 Cassis Open Provence – Singles =

Singles
- 2026 Cassis Open Provence

Final
- Champion: (France) Titouan Droguet
- Runner-up: (Estonia) Mark Lajal
- Score: 6–4, 7–6^{(7–3)}

Events
Singles	Doubles
- Cassis Open Provence

Billy Harris was the defending champion but lost in the second round to Moez Echargui.

Titouan Droguet won the title after defeating Mark Lajal 6–4, 7–6^{(7–3)} in the final.

== Seeds ==
1. (France) Titouan Droguet (champion)
2. (Austria) Jurij Rodionov (second round)
3. (Norway) Nicolai Budkov Kjær (semifinals)
4. (Estonia) Mark Lajal (final)
5. (Estonia) Daniil Glinka (quarterfinals)
6. (Belgium) Gauthier Onclin (first round)
7. (United Kingdom) Billy Harris (second round)
8. (France) Ugo Blanchet (quarterfinals)

== Draw ==
Key

- Q = Qualifier
- WC = Wild card
- LL = Lucky loser
- Alt = Alternate
- ITF = ITF entry
- PR = Protected ranking
- SR = Special ranking
- SE = Special exempt
- JE = Junior exempt
- JR = Junior Accelerator Programme entrant
- CO = College Accelerator Programme entrant
- NG = Next Gen Accelerator Program entrant
- w/o = Walkover
- r = Retired
- d = Defaulted

=== Finals ===
Semifinals
1	(France) Titouan Droguet	6^{4}	6	6
3	(Norway) Nicolai Budkov Kjær	7^{7}	2	4
4	(Estonia) Mark Lajal	7^{7}	7
Alt	(Germany) Daniel Masur	6^{2}	5

Final
1	(France) Titouan Droguet	6	7^{7}
4	(Estonia) Mark Lajal	4	6^{3}

=== Top half ===
First round
1	(France) T Droguet	6	6
Alt	(France) M Chazal	4	4
Alt	(Netherlands) G Brouwer	6	3	7^{7}
(France) M Martineau	2	6	6^{4}
Q	(France) Benjamin Pietri	3	4
(France) Mathys Erhard	6	6
Alt	(United Kingdom) R Peniston	6^{5}	2
5	(Estonia) D Glinka	7^{7}	6
3	(Norway) N Budkov Kjær	6	6
(France) F Balshaw	4	4
Q	(France) M Janvier	6	3	5
Q	(France) Yanis Ghazouani Durand	2	6	7
(Tunisia) M Echargui	6	6
(France) L Poullain	4	2
(France) H Grenier	5	3
7	(United Kingdom) B Harris	7	6

Second round
1	(France) T Droguet	6	7^{7}
Alt	(Netherlands) G Brouwer	2	6^{3}
(France) M Erhard	6^{3}	2^{r}
5	(Estonia) D Glinka	7^{7}	4
3	(Norway) N Budkov Kjær	6	7^{9}
Q	(France) Y Ghazouani Durand	1	6^{7}
(Tunisia) M Echargui	7	1	7^{7}
7	(United Kingdom) B Harris	5	6	6^{2}

Quarterfinals
1	(France) T Droguet	4	6	6
5	(Estonia) D Glinka	6	3	2
3	(Norway) N Budkov Kjær	6^{2}	7	6
(Tunisia) M Echargui	7^{7}	5	1

Semifinals
1	(France) T Droguet	6^{4}	6	6
3	(Norway) N Budkov Kjær	7^{7}	2	4

=== Bottom half ===
First round
6	(Belgium) G Onclin	4	2
(France) Raphael Perot	6	6
Q	(France) Mathieu Scaglia	2	4
(France) R Bertrand	6	6
WC	(France) Maé Malige	0	1
(France) S Gueymard Wayenburg	6	6
WC	(France) Lenny Couturier	3	3
4	(Estonia) M Lajal	6	6
8	(France) U Blanchet	6	6
WC	(France) L Lokoli	3	3
Q	(India) M Dhamne	3	4
(Spain) D Rincón	6	6
(France) D Added	4	4
Alt	(Germany) D Masur	6	6
Q	(France) M Bobichon	6^{4}	1
2	(Austria) J Rodionov	7^{7}	6

Second round
(France) R Perot	1	0
(France) R Bertrand	6	6
(France) S Gueymard Wayenburg	7^{7}	3	4
4	(Estonia) M Lajal	6^{3}	6	6
8	(France) U Blanchet	6	3	6
(Spain) D Rincón	3	6	3
Alt	(Germany) D Masur	5	6	6
2	(Austria) J Rodionov	7	3	1

Quarterfinals
(France) R Bertrand	3	0
4	(Estonia) M Lajal	6	6
8	(France) U Blanchet	6	4	6^{3}
Alt	(Germany) D Masur	2	6	7^{7}

Semifinals
4	(Estonia) M Lajal	7^{7}	7
Alt	(Germany) D Masur	6^{2}	5
