= 2019 Cassis Open Provence – Singles =

Singles
- 2019 Cassis Open Provence

Final
- Champion: (France) Jo-Wilfried Tsonga
- Runner-up: (Israel) Dudi Sela
- Score: 6–1, 6–0

Events
Singles	Doubles
- Cassis Open Provence

Enzo Couacaud was the defending champion but chose not to defend his title.

Jo-Wilfried Tsonga won the title after defeating Dudi Sela 6–1, 6–0 in the final.

== Seeds ==
All seeds receive a bye into the second round.

1. (France) Jo-Wilfried Tsonga (champion)
2. (France) Corentin Moutet (second round)
3. (Tunisia) Malek Jaziri (second round, retired)
4. (France) Antoine Hoang (second round)
5. (Sweden) Mikael Ymer (semifinals)
6. (Germany) Yannick Maden (third round, withdrew)
7. (Belarus) Ilya Ivashka (second round)
8. (Ukraine) Sergiy Stakhovsky (third round)
9. (Czech Republic) Lukáš Rosol (semifinals)
10. (France) Quentin Halys (second round)
11. (Israel) Dudi Sela (final)
12. (India) Ramkumar Ramanathan (second round)
13. (United Kingdom) Jay Clarke (second round)
14. (Finland) Emil Ruusuvuori (quarterfinals)
15. (Kazakhstan) Aleksandr Nedovyesov (quarterfinals)
16. (France) Gleb Sakharov (second round)

== Draw ==
Key

- Q = Qualifier
- WC = Wild card
- LL = Lucky loser
- Alt = Alternate
- ITF = ITF entry
- PR = Protected ranking
- SR = Special ranking
- SE = Special exempt
- JE = Junior exempt
- JR = Junior Accelerator Programme entrant
- CO = College Accelerator Programme entrant
- NG = Next Gen Accelerator Program entrant
- w/o = Walkover
- r = Retired
- d = Defaulted

=== Finals ===
Quarterfinals
1/WC	(France) Jo-Wilfried Tsonga	7^{8}	6
WC	(France) Rayane Roumane	6^{6}	3
(Kazakhstan) Dmitry Popko	4	4
5	(Sweden) Mikael Ymer	6	6
9	(Czech Republic) Lukáš Rosol	6	7
14	(Finland) Emil Ruusuvuori	2	5
11	(Israel) Dudi Sela	6	6
15	(Kazakhstan) Aleksandr Nedovyesov	4	4

Semifinals
1/WC	(France) Jo-Wilfried Tsonga	7	7^{8}
5	(Sweden) Mikael Ymer	5	6^{6}
9	(Czech Republic) Lukáš Rosol	3	2
11	(Israel) Dudi Sela	6	6

Final
1/WC	(France) Jo-Wilfried Tsonga	6	6
11	(Israel) Dudi Sela	1	0

=== Top half ===
==== Section 1 ====
First round
Alt	(Finland) H Heliövaara	6	7^{7}
(Brazil) F Meligeni Alves	4	6^{5}
(France) A Escoffier	3	6	6
Alt	(Switzerland) L Margaroli	6	1	2
(France) G Blancaneaux	3	6	4
WC	(France) R Roumane	6	4	6
(Belarus) U Ignatik	6^{5}	2
(France) T Lamasine	7^{7}	6

Second round
1/WC	(France) J-W Tsonga	6	6
Alt	(Finland) H Heliövaara	4	3
(France) A Escoffier	6	6
13	(United Kingdom) J Clarke	4	3
10	(France) Q Halys	6	1	4
WC	(France) R Roumane	3	6	6
(France) T Lamasine	6	6^{10}	1
8	(Ukraine) S Stakhovsky	2	7^{12}	6

Third round
1/WC	(France) J-W Tsonga	7	6
(France) A Escoffier	5	2
WC	(France) R Roumane	6	6
8	(Ukraine) S Stakhovsky	2	2

Quarterfinals
1/WC	(France) J-W Tsonga	7^{8}	6
WC	(France) R Roumane	6^{6}	3

==== Section 2 ====
First round
(Colombia) S Giraldo	6	6
WC	(France) Vivien Cabos	4	2
(Kazakhstan) D Popko	6	6
(France) D Added	2	3
(Germany) D Masur	6	6
(Germany) T Kamke	3	4
(Italy) A Arnaboldi	6	3	7
(France) A Müller	3	6	5

Second round
3	(Tunisia) M Jaziri	0^{r}
(Colombia) S Giraldo	2
(Kazakhstan) D Popko	6	6
16	(France) G Sakharov	1	2
12	(India) R Ramanathan	3	2
(Germany) D Masur	6	6
(Italy) A Arnaboldi	3	4
5	(Sweden) M Ymer	6	6

Third round
(Colombia) S Giraldo	1^{r}
(Kazakhstan) D Popko	4
(Germany) D Masur	2	6^{5}
5	(Sweden) M Ymer	6	7^{7}

Quarterfinals
(Kazakhstan) D Popko	4	4
5	(Sweden) M Ymer	6	6

=== Bottom half ===
==== Section 3 ====
First round
(France) H Gaston	6	6^{5}	3
(Switzerland) M-A Hüsler	4	7^{7}	6
Alt	(Israel) Yoav Schab	0	0
(Czech Republic) T Macháč	6	6
(Brazil) T Seyboth Wild	7^{7}	6
(France) M Martineau	6^{5}	4
(Russia) E Karlovskiy	6	6
(Austria) J Rodionov	3	4

Second round
6	(Germany) Y Maden	7	3	6
(Switzerland) M-A Hüsler	5	6	4
(Czech Republic) T Macháč	2	4
9	(Czech Republic) L Rosol	6	6
14	(Finland) E Ruusuvuori	6	6
(Brazil) T Seyboth Wild	3	3
(Russia) E Karlovskiy	6	7
4	(France) A Hoang	4	5

Third round
6	(Germany) Y Maden
9	(Czech Republic) L Rosol	w/o
14	(Finland) E Ruusuvuori	6	6
(Russia) E Karlovskiy	1	1

Quarterfinals
9	(Czech Republic) L Rosol	6	7
14	(Finland) E Ruusuvuori	2	5

==== Section 4 ====
First round
(United Kingdom) L Glasspool	4	4
(Ukraine) I Marchenko	6	6
Alt	(Netherlands) S Verbeek	6	6
(Norway) V Durasovic	1	4
Alt	(Spain) Jaume Pla Malfeito	5	1
(Sweden) M Eriksson	7	6
PR	(Austria) M Neuchrist	4	3
(France) H Grenier	6	6

Second round
7/WC	(Belarus) I Ivashka	6^{5}	4
(Ukraine) I Marchenko	7^{7}	6
Alt	(Netherlands) S Verbeek	6	4	1
11	(Israel) D Sela	3	6	6
15	(Kazakhstan) A Nedovyesov	6	6
(Sweden) M Eriksson	3	4
(France) H Grenier	6	6
2/WC	(France) C Moutet	3	2

Third round
(Ukraine) I Marchenko	6^{7}	0^{r}
11	(Israel) D Sela	7^{9}	4
15	(Kazakhstan) A Nedovyesov	6	6^{3}	6
(France) H Grenier	3	7^{7}	2

Quarterfinals
11	(Israel) D Sela	6	6
15	(Kazakhstan) A Nedovyesov	4	4
