= 2022 Cassis Open Provence =

- Date: 5–11 September
- Edition: 4th
- Surface: Hard
- Location: Cassis, France

Champions

Singles
- (France) Hugo Grenier

Doubles
- (Belgium) Michael Geerts / (Belgium) Joran Vliegen
← 2021 ·	Cassis Open Provence	· 2023 →

The 2022 Cassis Open Provence was a professional tennis tournament played on hard courts. It was the 4th edition of the tournament which was part of the 2022 ATP Challenger Tour. It took place in Cassis, France between 5 and 11 September 2022.

== Singles main-draw entrants ==
=== Seeds ===
Country	Player	Rank^{1}	Seed
FRA	Constant Lestienne	75	1
AUS	James Duckworth	83	2
FRA	Hugo Grenier	119	3
CZE	Tomáš Macháč	126	4
GER	Jan-Lennard Struff	135	5
GBR	Ryan Peniston	140	6
HUN	Zsombor Piros	158	7
JPN	Kaichi Uchida	168	8

- ^{1} Rankings are as of 29 August 2022.

=== Other entrants ===
The following players received wildcards into the singles main draw:

- (France) Clément Chidekh
- (France) Gabriel Debru
- (France) Sascha Gueymard Wayenburg

The following players received entry into the singles main draw as alternates:

- (Tunisia) Skander Mansouri
- (Japan) Hiroki Moriya
- (France) Clément Tabur

The following players received entry from the qualifying draw:

- (France) Térence Atmane
- (Brazil) Thomaz Bellucci
- (France) Robin Bertrand
- (France) Kenny de Schepper
- (France) Matteo Martineau
- (France) Albano Olivetti

== Champions ==
=== Singles ===
- (France) Hugo Grenier def. (Australia) James Duckworth 7–5, 6–4.

=== Doubles ===
- (Belgium) Michael Geerts / (Belgium) Joran Vliegen def. (Monaco) Romain Arneodo / (France) Albano Olivetti 6–4, 7–6^{(8–6)}.
