= 2024 Cassis Open Provence – Singles =

Singles
- 2024 Cassis Open Provence

Final
- Champion: (France) Richard Gasquet
- Runner-up: (Austria) Jurij Rodionov
- Score: 3–6, 6–1, 6–2

Events
Singles	Doubles
- Cassis Open Provence

Mattia Bellucci was the defending champion but chose not to defend his title.

Richard Gasquet won the title after defeating Jurij Rodionov 3–6, 6–1, 6–2 in the final, becoming the third-oldest Challenger champion in history.

== Seeds ==
1. (France) Constant Lestienne (second round)
2. (France) Benjamin Bonzi (second round)
3. (France) Richard Gasquet (champion)
4. (Argentina) Marco Trungelliti (second round)
5. (France) Titouan Droguet (quarterfinals)
6. (France) Ugo Blanchet (first round)
7. (Portugal) Jaime Faria (second round)
8. (Portugal) Henrique Rocha (semifinals)

== Draw ==
Key

- Q = Qualifier
- WC = Wild card
- LL = Lucky loser
- Alt = Alternate
- ITF = ITF entry
- PR = Protected ranking
- SR = Special ranking
- SE = Special exempt
- JE = Junior exempt
- JR = Junior Accelerator Programme entrant
- CO = College Accelerator Programme entrant
- NG = Next Gen Accelerator Program entrant
- w/o = Walkover
- r = Retired
- d = Defaulted

=== Finals ===
Semifinals
(Austria) Jurij Rodionov	6	3	6
8	(Portugal) Henrique Rocha	3	6	2
3/WC	(France) Richard Gasquet	6	6
Q	(Colombia) Adrià Soriano Barrera	4	2

Final
(Austria) Jurij Rodionov	6	1	2
3/WC	(France) Richard Gasquet	3	6	6

=== Top half ===
First round
1	(France) C Lestienne	7^{7}	6
Q	(France) S Gueymard Wayenburg	6^{3}	3
(Austria) J Rodionov	6	6
WC	(France) Maé Malige	4	4
(France) M Bourgue	2	1
(France) R Bertrand	6	6
(United Kingdom) L Broady	6^{2}	3
7	(Portugal) J Faria	7^{7}	6
4	(Argentina) M Trungelliti	7^{7}	7^{7}
LL	(France) Jules Marie	6^{5}	6^{2}
(France) M Guinard	6^{3}	3
Q	(France) L Lokoli	7^{7}	6
Q	(France) Damien Salvestre	2	4
Q	(France) D Added	6	6
(Paraguay) AD Vallejo	5	3
8	(Portugal) H Rocha	7	6

Second round
1	(France) C Lestienne	5	4
(Austria) J Rodionov	7	6
(France) R Bertrand	3	6	6
7	(Portugal) J Faria	6	3	2
4	(Argentina) M Trungelliti	6	3	3
Q	(France) L Lokoli	4	6	6
Q	(France) D Added	6	3	3
8	(Portugal) H Rocha	4	6	6

Quarterfinals
(Austria) J Rodionov	6	6
(France) R Bertrand	3	4
Q	(France) L Lokoli	2	3
8	(Portugal) H Rocha	6	6

Semifinals
(Austria) J Rodionov	6	3	6
8	(Portugal) H Rocha	3	6	2

=== Bottom half ===
First round
5	(France) T Droguet	6	7
Alt	(United Kingdom) A Gray	4	5
(Syria) H Naw	7^{7}	6
(United Kingdom) H Searle	6^{2}	3
(France) Antoine Cornut-Chauvinc	2	6	6
(France) M Martineau	6	4	3
(Switzerland) A Bellier	6^{4}	2
3/WC	(France) R Gasquet	7^{7}	6
6	(France) U Blanchet	7^{7}	2	6^{4}
WC	(Croatia) M Čilić	6^{5}	6	7^{7}
(France) A Escoffier	4	1
Q	(United Kingdom) K Edmund	6	6
LL	(France) L Poullain	2	3
Q	(Colombia) A Soriano Barrera	6	6
(United Kingdom) C Broom	3	6^{3}
2	(France) B Bonzi	6	7^{7}

Second round
5	(France) T Droguet	6	6
(Syria) H Naw	2	4
(France) A Cornut-Chauvinc	3	3
3/WC	(France) R Gasquet	6	6
WC	(Croatia) M Čilić	6	7
Q	(United Kingdom) K Edmund	2	5
Q	(Colombia) A Soriano Barrera	6	6
2	(France) B Bonzi	3	4

Quarterfinals
5	(France) T Droguet	2	7^{7}	3
3/WC	(France) R Gasquet	6	6^{1}	6
WC	(Croatia) M Čilić	6^{4}	5
Q	(Colombia) A Soriano Barrera	7^{7}	7

Semifinals
3/WC	(France) R Gasquet	6	6
Q	(Colombia) A Soriano Barrera	4	2
