= 2025 Cassis Open Provence – Singles =

Singles
- 2025 Cassis Open Provence

Final
- Champion: (United Kingdom) Billy Harris
- Runner-up: (Estonia) Daniil Glinka
- Score: 3–6, 7–5, 6–3

Events
Singles	Doubles
- Cassis Open Provence

Richard Gasquet was the defending champion but chose not to defend his title after retiring from professional tennis earlier in the year.

Billy Harris won the title after defeating Daniil Glinka 3–6, 7–5, 6–3 in the final.

== Seeds ==
1. (France) Quentin Halys (first round)
2. (Estonia) Mark Lajal (quarterfinals)
3. (United Kingdom) Billy Harris (champion)
4. (Austria) Jurij Rodionov (semifinals)
5. (France) Titouan Droguet (second round)
6. (Kazakhstan) Timofey Skatov (first round)
7. (France) Sascha Gueymard Wayenburg (first round)
8. (Monaco) Valentin Vacherot (quarterfinals)

== Draw ==
Key

- Q = Qualifier
- WC = Wild card
- LL = Lucky loser
- Alt = Alternate
- ITF = ITF entry
- PR = Protected ranking
- SR = Special ranking
- SE = Special exempt
- JE = Junior exempt
- JR = Junior Accelerator Programme entrant
- CO = College Accelerator Programme entrant
- NG = Next Gen Accelerator Program entrant
- w/o = Walkover
- r = Retired
- d = Defaulted

=== Finals ===
Semifinals
Alt	(Estonia) Daniil Glinka	6	6
4	(Austria) Jurij Rodionov	2	4
3	(United Kingdom) Billy Harris	6^{3}	7^{7}	6
Q	(Germany) Justin Engel	7^{7}	6^{5}	2

Final
Alt	(Estonia) Daniil Glinka	6	5	3
3	(United Kingdom) Billy Harris	3	7	6

=== Top half ===
First round
1	(France) Q Halys	4	6	3
Alt	(Estonia) D Glinka	6	1	6
Q	(United Kingdom) H Stewart	6	7^{10}
(France) D Added	3	6^{8}
(United Kingdom) A Fery	7^{7}	6
(Belgium) M Geerts	6^{5}	2
Q	(Poland) Olaf Pieczkowski	1	2
5	(France) T Droguet	6	6
4	(Austria) J Rodionov	6	6
(France) M Martineau	2	3
(France) R Bertrand	6	6
(Lithuania) E Butvilas	4	3
(France) L Poullain	5	3
(United States) M Mmoh	7	6
(France) C Chidekh	1	4
8	(Monaco) V Vacherot	6	6

Second round
Alt	(Estonia) D Glinka	7^{7}	6
Q	(United Kingdom) H Stewart	6^{5}	3
(United Kingdom) A Fery	6	6
5	(France) T Droguet	0	2
4	(Austria) J Rodionov	6	6
(France) R Bertrand	0	2
(United States) M Mmoh	3	4
8	(Monaco) V Vacherot	6	6

Quarterfinals
Alt	(Estonia) D Glinka	6	4	7^{7}
(United Kingdom) A Fery	2	6	6^{1}
4	(Austria) J Rodionov	6	3	6
8	(Monaco) V Vacherot	4	6	3

Semifinals
Alt	(Estonia) D Glinka	6	6
4	(Austria) J Rodionov	2	4

=== Bottom half ===
First round
6	(Kazakhstan) T Skatov	4	2
(France) A Escoffier	6	6
WC	(France) B Paire	3	4
WC	(France) Maé Malige	6	6
Q	(France) K de Schepper	5	7	2
(Ivory Coast) E Coulibaly	7	5	6
LL	(Italy) F Moroni	7^{7}	3	3
3	(United Kingdom) B Harris	6^{4}	6	6
7	(France) S Gueymard Wayenburg	4	4
WC	(France) Étienne Donnet	6	6
Q	(Switzerland) J Paul	7^{7}	6^{5}	1
Q	(Germany) J Engel	6^{3}	7^{7}	6
(France) T Paris	6	3	6
Alt	(Sweden) O Wallin	2	6	4
Q	(France) M Janvier	4	1
2	(Estonia) M Lajal	6	6

Second round
(France) A Escoffier	4	3
WC	(France) M Malige	6	6
(Ivory Coast) E Coulibaly	6^{1}	2
3	(United Kingdom) B Harris	7^{7}	6
WC	(France) É Donnet	6^{5}	2
Q	(Germany) J Engel	7^{7}	6
(France) T Paris	5	4
2	(Estonia) M Lajal	7	6

Quarterfinals
WC	(France) M Malige	6^{5}	1
3	(United Kingdom) B Harris	7^{7}	6
Q	(Germany) J Engel	7^{7}	4	6
2	(Estonia) M Lajal	6^{3}	6	3

Semifinals
3	(United Kingdom) B Harris	6^{3}	7^{7}	6
Q	(Germany) J Engel	7^{7}	6^{5}	2
