= 2021 Cassis Open Provence – Doubles =

Doubles
- 2021 Cassis Open Provence

Final
- Champions: (India) Sriram Balaji (India) Ramkumar Ramanathan
- Runners-up: (Mexico) Hans Hach Verdugo (Mexico) Miguel Ángel Reyes-Varela
- Score: 6–4, 3–6, [10–6]

Events
Singles	Doubles
← 2019 ·	Cassis Open Provence	· 2022 →

André Göransson and Sem Verbeek were the defending champions but chose not to defend their title.

Sriram Balaji and Ramkumar Ramanathan won the title after defeating Hans Hach Verdugo and Miguel Ángel Reyes-Varela 6–4, 3–6, [10–6] in the final.

== Seeds ==
1. (Monaco) Romain Arneodo / (France) Albano Olivetti (quarterfinals)
2. (Mexico) Hans Hach Verdugo / (Mexico) Miguel Ángel Reyes-Varela (final)
3. (India) Sriram Balaji / (India) Ramkumar Ramanathan (champions)
4. (India) Jeevan Nedunchezhiyan / (India) Purav Raja (first round)

== Draw ==
=== Key ===
- Q = Qualifier
- WC = Wild card
- LL = Lucky loser
- Alt = Alternate
- ITF = ITF entry
- PR = Protected ranking
- SR = Special ranking
- SE = Special exempt
- JE = Junior exempt
- JR = Junior Accelerator Programme entrant
- CO = College Accelerator Programme entrant
- NG = Next Gen Accelerator Program entrant
- w/o = Walkover
- r = Retired
- d = Defaulted

First round
WC	(India) A Chandrasekar (India) Vignesh Peranamallur	4	4
(United States) E Escobedo (Brazil) F Romboli	6	6
(Turkey) A Çelikbilek (Russia) R Safiullin	6	7^{8}
(United Kingdom) L Broady (United Kingdom) L Johnson	2	6^{6}
(Romania) VV Cornea (Greece) Pe Tsitsipas	6	7^{7}
(United States) JC Aragone (Colombia) N Barrientos	4	6^{5}
(Japan) T Matsui (Japan) K Uesugi	7	6
4	(India) J Nedunchezhiyan (India) P Raja	5	1
(France) A Cazaux (United States) Z Khan
(Poland) K Drzewiecki (Poland) K Żuk	w/o

Quarterfinals
1	(Monaco) R Arneodo (France) A Olivetti	6^{7}	6^{13}
(United States) E Escobedo (Brazil) F Romboli	7^{9}	7^{15}
3	(India) S Balaji (India) R Ramanathan	w/o
(Turkey) A Çelikbilek (Russia) R Safiullin
(Romania) VV Cornea (Greece) Pe Tsitsipas	7	4	[8]
(Japan) T Matsui (Japan) K Uesugi	5	6	[10]
(Poland) K Drzewiecki (Poland) K Żuk	1	3
2	(Mexico) H Hach Verdugo (Mexico) MÁ Reyes-Varela	6	6

Semifinals
(United States) E Escobedo (Brazil) F Romboli	3	2
3	(India) S Balaji (India) R Ramanathan	6	6
(Japan) T Matsui (Japan) K Uesugi	6	6^{4}	[7]
2	(Mexico) H Hach Verdugo (Mexico) MÁ Reyes-Varela	3	7^{7}	[10]

Final
3	(India) S Balaji (India) R Ramanathan	6	3	[10]
2	(Mexico) H Hach Verdugo (Mexico) MÁ Reyes-Varela	4	6	[6]
