= 2018 Cassis Open Provence – Doubles =

Doubles
- 2018 Cassis Open Provence

Final
- Champions: (Australia) Matt Reid (Ukraine) Sergiy Stakhovsky
- Runners-up: (Switzerland) Marc-Andrea Hüsler (Portugal) Gonçalo Oliveira
- Score: 6–2, 6–3

Events
| Singles | Doubles |
- Cassis Open Provence

This was the first edition of the tournament.

Matt Reid and Sergiy Stakhovsky won the title after defeating Marc-Andrea Hüsler and Gonçalo Oliveira 6–2, 6–3 in the final.

== Seeds ==
1. (Russia) Mikhail Elgin / (Belarus) Andrei Vasilevski (quarterfinals)
2. (Switzerland) Marc-Andrea Hüsler / (Portugal) Gonçalo Oliveira (final)
3. (Australia) Matt Reid / (Ukraine) Sergiy Stakhovsky (champions)
4. (Sweden) Markus Eriksson / (Sweden) André Göransson (semifinals)

== Draw ==
Key

- Q = Qualifier
- WC = Wild card
- LL = Lucky loser
- Alt = Alternate
- ITF = ITF entry
- PR = Protected ranking
- SR = Special ranking
- SE = Special exempt
- JE = Junior exempt
- JR = Junior Accelerator Programme entrant
- CO = College Accelerator Programme entrant
- NG = Next Gen Accelerator Program entrant
- w/o = Walkover
- r = Retired
- d = Defaulted

First round
1 | (Russia) M Elgin (Belarus) A Vasilevski | 6 | 6
(France) D Guez (France) A Müller | 3 | 2
(Slovakia) N Gombos (Czech Republic) V Šafránek
(Russia) E Karlovskiy (Kazakhstan) T Khabibulin | w/o
3 | (Australia) M Reid (Ukraine) S Stakhovsky | 2 | 7 | [10]
(United Kingdom) D Evans (United Kingdom) J O'Mara | 6 | 5 | [5]
WC | (Turkey) C İlkel (Turkey) E Kırkın | 1 | 4
(France) G Barrère (France) Q Halys | 6 | 6
(Serbia) N Milojević (Spain) O Roca Batalla | 7^{8} | 6
WC | (France) Tony Bourcet (France) A Escoffier | 6^{6} | 4
(Spain) A Menéndez Maceiras (Kazakhstan) A Nedovyesov | 5 | 3
4 | (Sweden) M Eriksson (Sweden) A Göransson | 7 | 6
(Germany) M Moraing (Germany) O Otte | 4 | 3
WC | (France) A Hoang (France) Maxime Tchoutakian | 6 | 6
(France) E Benchetrit (France) C Moutet | 4 | 5
2 | (Switzerland) M-A Hüsler (Portugal) G Oliveira | 6 | 7

Quarterfinals
1 | (Russia) M Elgin (Belarus) A Vasilevski | 4 | 6^{2}
(Russia) E Karlovskiy (Kazakhstan) T Khabibulin | 6 | 7^{7}
3 | (Australia) M Reid (Ukraine) S Stakhovsky | 6 | 6
(France) G Barrère (France) Q Halys | 4 | 3
(Serbia) N Milojević (Spain) O Roca Batalla | 4 | 6^{5}
4 | (Sweden) M Eriksson (Sweden) A Göransson | 6 | 7^{7}
WC | (France) A Hoang (France) M Tchoutakian | 6 | 2 | [4]
2 | (Switzerland) M-A Hüsler (Portugal) G Oliveira | 2 | 6 | [10]

Semifinals
(Russia) E Karlovskiy (Kazakhstan) T Khabibulin | 4 | 6^{1}
3 | (Australia) M Reid (Ukraine) S Stakhovsky | 6 | 7^{7}
4 | (Sweden) M Eriksson (Sweden) A Göransson | 0 | 5
2 | (Switzerland) M-A Hüsler (Portugal) G Oliveira | 6 | 7

Final
3 | (Australia) M Reid (Ukraine) S Stakhovsky | 6 | 6
2 | (Switzerland) M-A Hüsler (Portugal) G Oliveira | 2 | 3
