= 2021 Cassis Open Provence – Singles =

Singles
- 2021 Cassis Open Provence

Final
- Champion: (France) Benjamin Bonzi
- Runner-up: (France) Lucas Pouille
- Score: 7–6^{(7–4)}, 6–4

Events
Singles	Doubles
- Cassis Open Provence

Jo-Wilfried Tsonga was the defending champion but chose not to defend his title.

Benjamin Bonzi won the title after defeating Lucas Pouille 7–6^{(7–4)}, 6–4 in the final.

== Seeds ==
1. (France) Benjamin Bonzi (champion)
2. (Japan) Yasutaka Uchiyama (withdrew)
3. (Australia) Christopher O'Connell (withdrew)
4. (Kazakhstan) Mikhail Kukushkin (first round, retired)
5. (France) Lucas Pouille (final)
6. (France) Grégoire Barrère (first round)
7. (Austria) Jurij Rodionov (first round)
8. (United Kingdom) Liam Broady (semifinals)

== Draw ==
Key

- Q = Qualifier
- WC = Wild card
- LL = Lucky loser
- Alt = Alternate
- ITF = ITF entry
- PR = Protected ranking
- SR = Special ranking
- SE = Special exempt
- JE = Junior exempt
- JR = Junior Accelerator Programme entrant
- CO = College Accelerator Programme entrant
- NG = Next Gen Accelerator Program entrant
- w/o = Walkover
- r = Retired
- d = Defaulted

=== Finals ===
Semifinals
1	(France) Benjamin Bonzi	6	6
(Poland) Kacper Żuk	3	4
8	(United Kingdom) Liam Broady	4	3
5	(France) Lucas Pouille	6	6

Final
1	(France) Benjamin Bonzi	7^{7}	6
5	(France) Lucas Pouille	6^{4}	4

=== Top half ===
First round
1	(France) B Bonzi	7	6
(Italy) T Fabbiano	5	3
LL	(Canada) A Galarneau	6	6
Alt	(Australia) B Tomic	1	2
WC	(France) L Van Assche	5
Alt	(Japan) Yo Watanuki	0^{r}
(Turkey) A Çelikbilek	6	6
6	(France) G Barrère	3	3
4	(Kazakhstan) M Kukushkin	0	2^{r}
(Russia) R Safiullin	6	4
Q	(France) G Mpetshi Perricard	2	4
(Australia) T Kokkinakis	6	6
WC	(France) A Fils	6^{13}	7	1
Alt	(Japan) T Ito	7^{15}	5	6
(Poland) K Żuk	6	6
7	(Austria) J Rodionov	3	3

Second round
1	(France) B Bonzi	7	7^{7}
LL	(Canada) A Galarneau	5	6^{4}
WC	(France) L Van Assche	6	6^{0}	6
(Turkey) A Çelikbilek	3	7^{7}	3
(Russia) R Safiullin	6^{10}	6	2
(Australia) T Kokkinakis	7^{12}	3	6
Alt	(Japan) T Ito	5	3
(Poland) K Żuk	7	6

Quarterfinals
1	(France) B Bonzi	6	3	6
WC	(France) L Van Assche	3	6	2
(Australia) T Kokkinakis	4	6^{3}
(Poland) K Żuk	6	7^{7}

Semifinals
1	(France) B Bonzi	6	6
(Poland) K Żuk	3	4

=== Bottom half ===
First round
8	(United Kingdom) L Broady	6	6
(United States) E Escobedo	2	4
LL	(France) L Lokoli	2	2
(France) M Bourgue	6	6
Alt	(France) H Grenier	6	6^{11}	6
(Japan) G Soeda	4	7^{13}	1
(Latvia) E Gulbis	3	6	2
Q	(India) R Ramanathan	6	0	6
5	(France) L Pouille	6	7^{7}
(Portugal) J Sousa	1	6^{3}
(Sweden) E Ymer	7	6
(France) A Müller	5	4
Q	(Japan) H Moriya	6	7^{7}
Q	(Chile) N Jarry	4	6^{5}
WC	(France) C Chidekh	6	6
LL	(France) A Cazaux	4	4

Second round
8	(United Kingdom) L Broady	7^{7}	7^{7}
(France) M Bourgue	6^{3}	6^{0}
Alt	(France) H Grenier	6	3	4
Q	(India) R Ramanathan	4	6	6
5	(France) L Pouille	7^{7}	6
(Sweden) E Ymer	6^{5}	1
Q	(Japan) H Moriya	3	0
WC	(France) C Chidekh	6	6

Quarterfinals
8	(United Kingdom) L Broady	7^{9}	6
Q	(India) R Ramanathan	6^{7}	4
5	(France) L Pouille	7^{7}	6
WC	(France) C Chidekh	6^{1}	4

Semifinals
8	(United Kingdom) L Broady	4	3
5	(France) L Pouille	6	6
