= 2025 Cassis Open Provence – Doubles =

Doubles
- 2025 Cassis Open Provence

Final
- Champions: (Austria) David Pichler (Austria) Jurij Rodionov
- Runners-up: (France) Arthur Reymond (France) Luca Sanchez
- Score: 7–6^{(7–2)}, 6–4

Events
Singles	Doubles
- Cassis Open Provence

Jaime Faria and Henrique Rocha were the defending champions but chose not to defend their title.

David Pichler and Jurij Rodionov won the title after defeating Arthur Reymond and Luca Sanchez 7–6^{(7–2)}, 6–4 in the final.

== Seeds ==
1. (India) Jeevan Nedunchezhiyan / (Switzerland) Jakub Paul (semifinals)
2. (United States) Mac Kiger / (United Kingdom) Joshua Paris (withdrew)
3. (France) Arthur Reymond / (France) Luca Sanchez (final)
4. (Austria) David Pichler / (Austria) Jurij Rodionov (champions)

== Draw ==
Key

- Q = Qualifier
- WC = Wild card
- LL = Lucky loser
- Alt = Alternate
- ITF = ITF entry
- PR = Protected ranking
- SR = Special ranking
- SE = Special exempt
- JE = Junior exempt
- JR = Junior Accelerator Programme entrant
- CO = College Accelerator Programme entrant
- NG = Next Gen Accelerator Program entrant
- w/o = Walkover
- r = Retired
- d = Defaulted

=== Draw ===
First round
1	(India) J Nedunchezhiyan (Switzerland) J Paul	7^{7}	6
(United Kingdom) J MacKinlay (United Kingdom) H Stewart	6^{4}	3
(Belgium) M Geerts (Netherlands) T Loof	7^{7}	4	[10]
(France) C Chidekh (Antigua and Barbuda) J Maginley	6^{3}	6	[7]
4	(Austria) D Pichler (Austria) J Rodionov	6	6
(United States) Zachary Fuchs (United States) Wally Thayne	4	4
(Ivory Coast) E Coulibaly (Ghana) I Nortey	6	6
WC	(France) Hugo Cardinaud (France) Nicolas Tepmahc	1	3
WC	(France) Hugo Car (France) Pierre Antoine Tailleu	6	6
(United States) Felix Corwin (United States) Jamie Vance	3	2
(United States) S Bangoura (France) R Bertrand	6	3	[9]
3	(France) A Reymond (France) L Sanchez	4	6	[11]
(France) K de Schepper (France) A Escoffier	4	6	[3]
(Sweden) E Grevelius (Sweden) A Heinonen	6	4	[10]
(Bulgaria) A Genov (France) Enzo Wallart	7^{7}	6
Alt	(France) Robin Catry (Italy) F Moroni	6^{4}	3

Quarterfinals
1	(India) J Nedunchezhiyan (Switzerland) J Paul	6	6
(Belgium) M Geerts (Netherlands) T Loof	2	3
4	(Austria) D Pichler (Austria) J Rodionov	7	6
(Ivory Coast) E Coulibaly (Ghana) I Nortey	5	3
WC	(France) H Car (France) PA Tailleu	4	2
3	(France) A Reymond (France) L Sanchez	6	6
(Sweden) E Grevelius (Sweden) A Heinonen	6^{5}	4
(Bulgaria) A Genov (France) E Wallart	7^{7}	6

Semifinals
1	(India) J Nedunchezhiyan (Switzerland) J Paul	5	6^{3}
4	(Austria) D Pichler (Austria) J Rodionov	7	7^{7}
3	(France) A Reymond (France) L Sanchez	6	6
(Bulgaria) A Genov (France) E Wallart	2	0

Final
4	(Austria) D Pichler (Austria) J Rodionov	7^{7}	6
3	(France) A Reymond (France) L Sanchez	6^{2}	4
