= 2023 Cassis Open Provence – Singles =

Singles
- 2023 Cassis Open Provence

Final
- Champion: (Italy) Mattia Bellucci
- Runner-up: (Czech Republic) Tomáš Macháč
- Score: 6–3, 6–4

Events
Singles	Doubles
- Cassis Open Provence

Hugo Grenier was the defending champion but chose not to defend his title.

Mattia Bellucci won the title after defeating Tomáš Macháč 6–3, 6–4 in the final.

== Seeds ==
1. (France) Alexandre Müller (semifinals)
2. (United Kingdom) Liam Broady (semifinals)
3. (France) Benjamin Bonzi (first round)
4. (Czech Republic) Tomáš Macháč (final)
5. (Italy) Giulio Zeppieri (quarterfinals)
6. (France) Antoine Escoffier (withdrew)
7. (Italy) Mattia Bellucci (champion)
8. (Italy) Federico Gaio (second round)

== Draw ==
Key

- Q = Qualifier
- WC = Wild card
- LL = Lucky loser
- Alt = Alternate
- ITF = ITF entry
- PR = Protected ranking
- SR = Special ranking
- SE = Special exempt
- JE = Junior exempt
- JR = Junior Accelerator Programme entrant
- CO = College Accelerator Programme entrant
- NG = Next Gen Accelerator Program entrant
- w/o = Walkover
- r = Retired
- d = Defaulted

=== Finals ===
Semifinals
1	(France) Alexandre Müller	6	3	6^{8}
4	(Czech Republic) Tomáš Macháč	3	6	7^{10}
7	(Italy) Mattia Bellucci	6	6
2	(United Kingdom) Liam Broady	3	4

Final
4	(Czech Republic) Tomáš Macháč	3	4
7	(Italy) Mattia Bellucci	6	6

=== Top half ===
First round
1	(France) A Müller	6	2	7
(Portugal) J Sousa	3	6	5
(France) L Lokoli	7^{7}	7
(France) U Blanchet	6^{4}	5
(France) M Janvier	6	6
Q	(United States) Christian Langmo	3	3
Q	(Denmark) A Holmgren	3	3
5	(Italy) G Zeppieri	6	6
4	(Czech Republic) T Macháč	6	6
WC	(France) S Gueymard Wayenburg	2	4
(Colombia) N Mejía	4	6	6
WC	(France) A Hoang	6	3	3
(Tunisia) M Echargui	7^{8}	6^{1}	3
(Spain) A Moro Cañas	6^{6}	7^{7}	6
(North Macedonia) K Ivanovski	6	3	4
8	(Italy) F Gaio	1	6	6

Second round
1	(France) A Müller	6	6
(France) L Lokoli	3	2
(France) M Janvier	5	5
5	(Italy) G Zeppieri	7	7
4	(Czech Republic) T Macháč	6	6
(Colombia) N Mejía	4	4
(Spain) A Moro Cañas	6	6
8	(Italy) F Gaio	3	2

Quarterfinals
1	(France) A Müller	6	6
5	(Italy) G Zeppieri	4	2
4	(Czech Republic) T Macháč	7^{7}	6
(Spain) A Moro Cañas	6^{5}	1

Semifinals
1	(France) A Müller	6	3	6^{8}
4	(Czech Republic) T Macháč	3	6	7^{10}

=== Bottom half ===
First round
7	(Italy) M Bellucci	6	6
Q	(India) R Ramanathan	2	4
(France) Jules Marie	6	6^{3}	6^{4}
(Austria) M Neuchrist	2	7^{7}	7^{7}
Q	(United Kingdom) C Broom	6	7
LL	(United Kingdom) A McHugh	2	5
(France) L Poullain	6	6
3	(France) B Bonzi	3	1
LL	(Denmark) E Møller	6	6
Q	(Morocco) E Benchetrit	3	1
(Estonia) M Lajal	3	6^{6}
(United Kingdom) B Harris	6	7^{8}
Q	(United Kingdom) D Cox	2	6^{6}
(Portugal) F Ferreira Silva	6	7^{8}
(France) D Added	0	2
2	(United Kingdom) L Broady	6	6

Second round
7	(Italy) M Bellucci	6	6
(Austria) M Neuchrist	2	3
Q	(United Kingdom) C Broom	6^{5}	4
(France) L Poullain	7^{7}	6
LL	(Denmark) E Møller	1	5
(United Kingdom) B Harris	6	7
(Portugal) F Ferreira Silva	2	2
2	(United Kingdom) L Broady	6	6

Quarterfinals
7	(Italy) M Bellucci	1	6	6
(France) L Poullain	6	3	0
(United Kingdom) B Harris	4	3
2	(United Kingdom) L Broady	6	6

Semifinals
7	(Italy) M Bellucci	6	6
2	(United Kingdom) L Broady	3	4
