= 2021 Cassis Open Provence =

- Date: 6–12 September
- Edition: 3rd
- Surface: Hard
- Location: Cassis, France

Champions

Singles
- (France) Benjamin Bonzi

Doubles
- (India) Sriram Balaji / (India) Ramkumar Ramanathan
← 2019 ·	Cassis Open Provence	· 2022 →

The 2021 Cassis Open Provence was a professional tennis tournament played on hard courts. It was the 3rd edition of the tournament which was part of the 2021 ATP Challenger Tour. It took place in Cassis, France between 6 and 12 September 2021.

== Singles main-draw entrants ==
=== Seeds ===
Country	Player	Rank^{1}	Seed
FRA	Benjamin Bonzi	94	1
~~JPN~~	~~Yasutaka Uchiyama~~	~~123~~	~~2~~
~~AUS~~	~~Christopher O'Connell~~	~~126~~	~~3~~
KAZ	Mikhail Kukushkin	129	4
FRA	Lucas Pouille	133	5
FRA	Grégoire Barrère	136	6
AUT	Jurij Rodionov	140	7
GBR	Liam Broady	147	8

- ^{1} Rankings are as of 30 August 2021.

=== Other entrants ===
The following players received wildcards into the singles main draw:

- (France) Clément Chidekh
- (France) Arthur Fils
- (France) Luca Van Assche

The following players received entry into the singles main draw as alternates:

- (France) Hugo Grenier
- (Japan) Tatsuma Ito
- (Australia) Bernard Tomic
- (Japan) Yosuke Watanuki

The following players received entry from the qualifying draw:

- (Chile) Nicolás Jarry
- (Japan) Hiroki Moriya
- (France) Giovanni Mpetshi Perricard
- (India) Ramkumar Ramanathan

The following players received entry as lucky losers:

- (France) Arthur Cazaux
- (Canada) Alexis Galarneau
- (France) Laurent Lokoli

== Champions ==
=== Singles ===
- (France) Benjamin Bonzi def. (France) Lucas Pouille 7–6^{(7–4)}, 6–4.

=== Doubles ===
- (India) Sriram Balaji / (India) Ramkumar Ramanathan def. (Mexico) Hans Hach Verdugo / (Mexico) Miguel Ángel Reyes-Varela 6–4, 3–6, [10–6].
