= 2023 Cassis Open Provence =

- Date: 4–10 September
- Edition: 5th
- Surface: Hard
- Location: Cassis, France

Champions

Singles
- (Italy) Mattia Bellucci

Doubles
- (France) Dan Added / (France) Jonathan Eysseric
- Cassis Open Provence

The 2023 Cassis Open Provence was a professional tennis tournament played on hard courts. It was the fifth edition of the tournament which was part of the 2023 ATP Challenger Tour. It took place in Cassis, France between 4 and 10 September 2023.

== Singles main-draw entrants ==
=== Seeds ===
Country	Player	Rank^{1}	Seed
FRA	Alexandre Müller	84	1
GBR	Liam Broady	107	2
FRA	Benjamin Bonzi	108	3
CZE	Tomáš Macháč	121	4
ITA	Giulio Zeppieri	136	5
~~FRA~~	~~Antoine Escoffier~~	~~156~~	~~6~~
ITA	Mattia Bellucci	182	7
ITA	Federico Gaio	215	8

- ^{1} Rankings are as of 28 August 2023.

=== Other entrants ===
The following players received wildcards into the singles main draw:

- (France) ~~Kenny de Schepper~~
- (France) Sascha Gueymard Wayenburg
- (France) Antoine Hoang

The following players received entry from the qualifying draw:

- (Morocco) Elliot Benchetrit
- (United Kingdom) Charles Broom
- (United Kingdom) Daniel Cox
- (Denmark) August Holmgren
- (United States) Christian Langmo
- (India) Ramkumar Ramanathan

The following players received entry as lucky losers:

- (United Kingdom) Aidan McHugh
- (Denmark) Elmer Møller

== Champions ==
=== Singles ===
- (Italy) Mattia Bellucci def. (Czech Republic) Tomáš Macháč 6–3, 6–4.

=== Doubles ===
- (France) Dan Added / (France) Jonathan Eysseric def. (United Kingdom) Liam Broady / (France) Antoine Hoang 6–0, 4–6, [11–9].
