= Ugo Humbert =

French tennis player (born 1998)

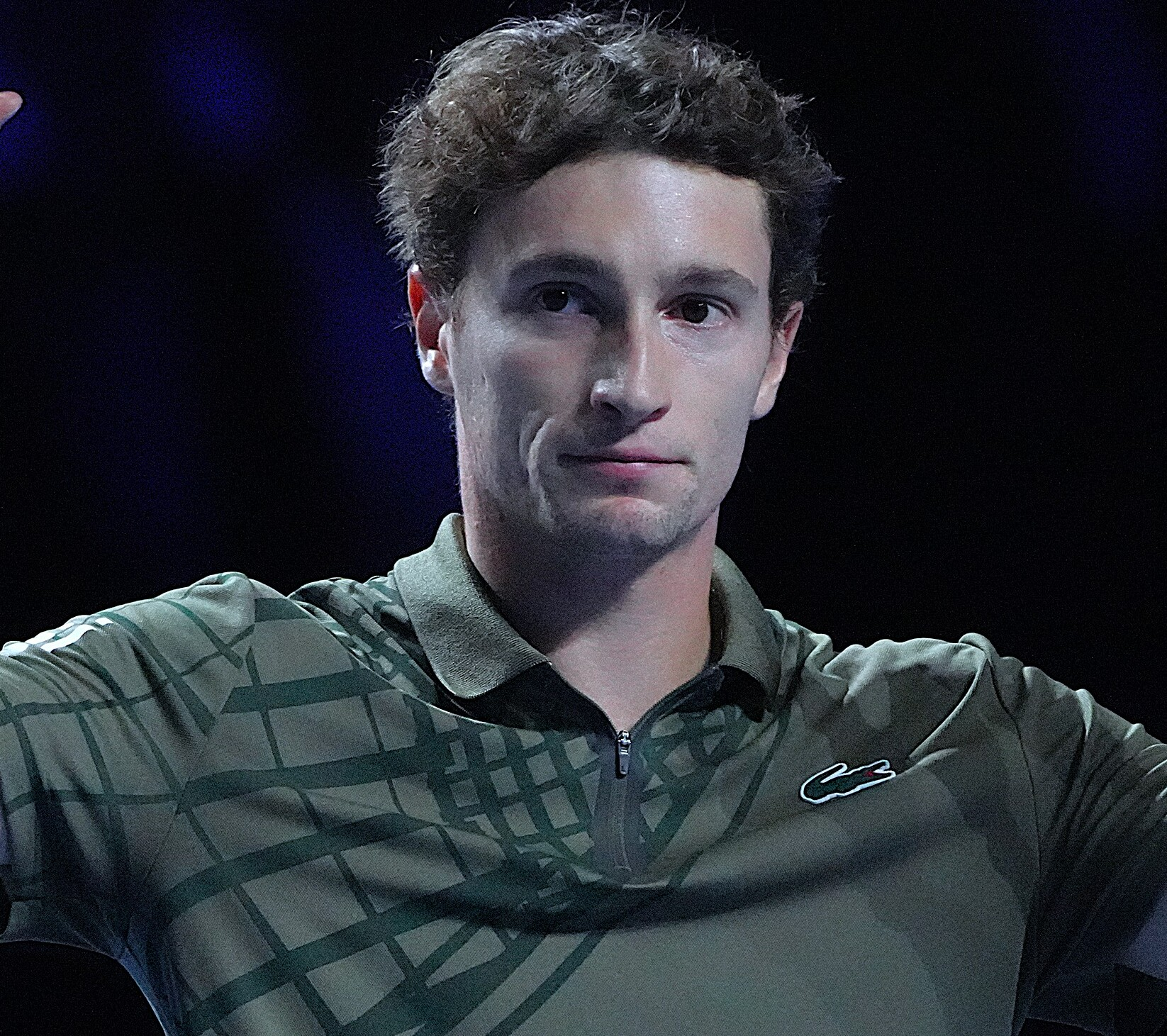
- Humbert at the 2025 Swiss Indoors
- Country (sports): France
- Residence: Luxembourg City, Luxembourg
- Born: 26 June 1998 (age 28) Metz, France
- Height: 1.88 m (6 ft 2 in)
- Turned pro: 2016
- Plays: Left-handed (two-handed backhand)
- Coach: Fabrice Martin (Dec 2024–Aug 2025), Jérémy Chardy (2022-Jan 2025, Sep 2025-)
- Prize money: US $11,808,708

Singles
- Career record: 193–166
- Career titles: 7
- Highest ranking: No. 13 (15 April 2024)
- Current ranking: No. 39 (9 November 2026)

Grand Slam singles results
- Australian Open: 4R (2025)
- French Open: 2R (2023, 2025, 2026)
- Wimbledon: 4R (2019, 2024)
- US Open: 2R (2018, 2020, 2024)

Other tournaments
- Olympic Games: QF (2021)

Doubles
- Career record: 7–34
- Career titles: 0
- Highest ranking: No. 348 (26 August 2024)

Grand Slam doubles results
- Australian Open: 1R (2020)
- French Open: 1R (2018, 2019, 2020, 2022)
- Wimbledon: 1R (2019, 2022, 2023)

Other doubles tournaments
- Olympic Games: 1R (2024)

Grand Slam mixed doubles results
- French Open: 1R (2018, 2024)
- Last updated on: 31 August 2026.

Ugo Humbert (French pronunciation: [yɡo œ̃bɛʁ]; born 26 June 1998) is a French professional tennis player. He has a career-high ATP singles ranking of world No. 13, achieved on 15 April 2024 and a doubles ranking of No. 348, achieved on 26 August 2024. He has won seven ATP Tour singles titles, and was finalist at the Masters 1000 event in 2024 Paris. He is currently the No. 3 singles player from France.

Humbert won his first ATP Tour match and made his major singles debut in 2018. At the 2019 Wimbledon Championships, he reached the fourth round, where he lost to eventual champion Novak Djokovic.

== Early life ==
Humbert was born in Metz, the son of Eric and Anne, and has one sister, Léa. Both parents and sister are butchers and caterers and run a store in Metz.

== Career ==
=== Juniors ===
When Humbert was 12, he made the difficult decision to take the train to Poitiers to train with the French Tennis Federation. He ended up moving to Poitiers and continued his training. However, he suffered a string of injuries that prevented him from playing for a year and a half.

In 2015, he reached the Abierto Juvenil Mexicano doubles final with Geoffrey Blancaneaux. His career-high junior ranking is No. 18, achieved in January 2016.

=== 2017: First ITF title ===
In September 2017, Humbert claimed his first Futures title in Bagnères-de-Bigorre where he had received a wildcard. A week later, he was again awarded a wildcard into the Moselle Open where he reached the second round but fell in three sets to Simone Bolelli.

In November, he achieved his first victory against a top 100 player by beating Thomas Fabbiano (No. 73) during Paris Masters first-round qualifying match.

=== 2018: Grand Slam, ATP and top 100 debuts ===
After a disappointing first half of the season on the ATP Challenger Tour, Humbert experienced a breakthrough over the summer when he reached three Challenger finals in as many weeks. After losing the first two in Gatineau and Granby, Humbert captured his maiden Challenger title in Segovia. That run allowed him to qualify for the US Open qualifying tournament, where he won a spot in his first singles Grand Slam main draw. In the opening round, he defeated Collin Altamirano, a fellow qualifier, before losing in four sets to Stan Wawrinka.

In September, Humbert reached once again the final of a Challenger tournament in Cassis, falling to Enzo Couacaud. The next week, he received a wildcard into the 2018 Moselle Open, where in reached the second round by defeating Bernard Tomic before falling to Nikoloz Basilashvili.

At the beginning of October, Humbert claimed his second Challenger title in Ortisei against world No. 55, Pierre-Hugues Herbert, rising to a career-high of world No. 99.

=== 2019: First tour-level semifinal, Wimbledon fourth round ===
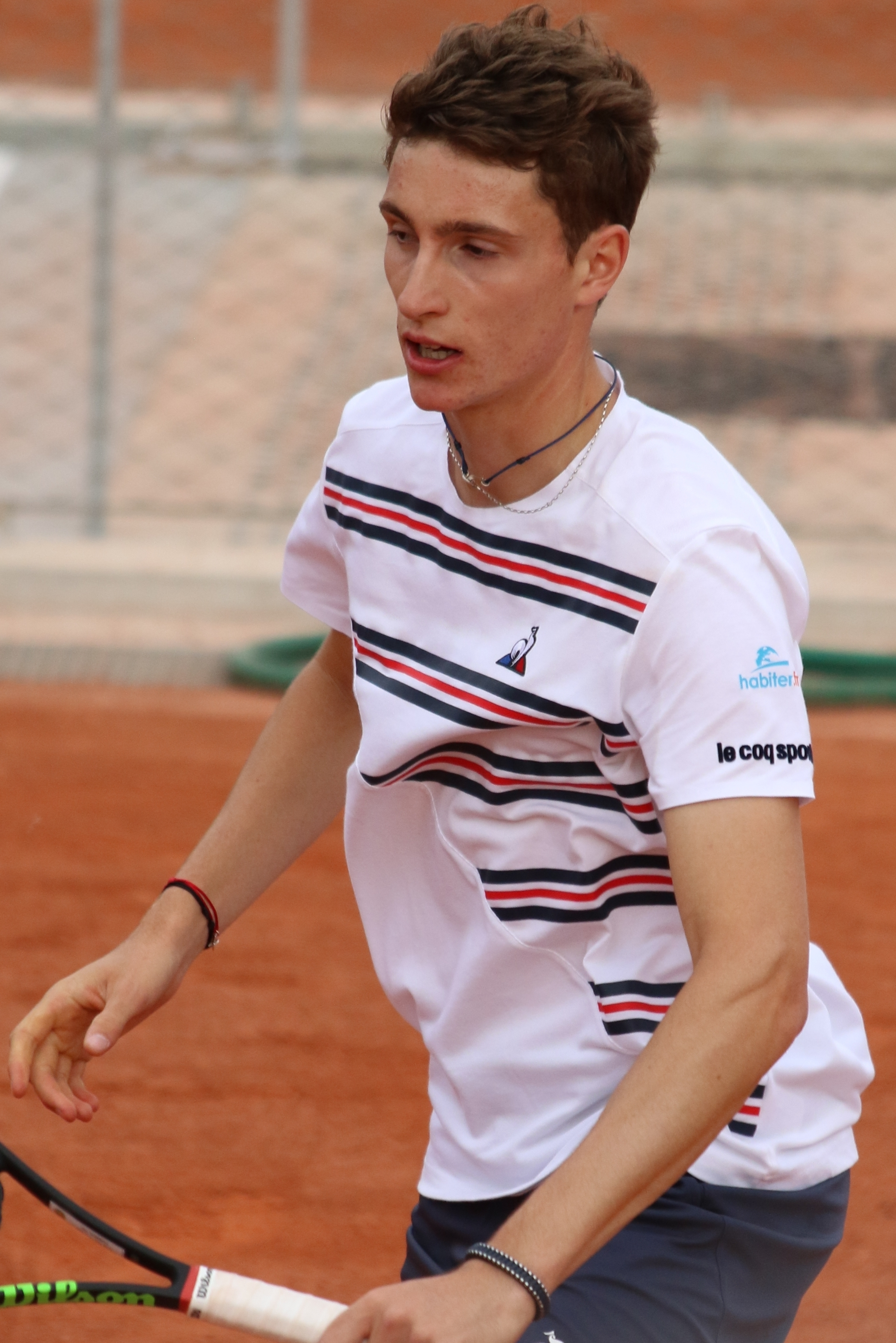
Humbert at the 2019 French Open

Humbert started the season at the Brisbane International. Getting past qualifying, he lost in the first round to Yasutaka Uchiyama. The following week, Humbert played at the ASB Classic in Auckland. He successfully qualified for the main draw. Once in the main draw, he drew lucky loser Pablo Cuevas, defeating him in straight sets for his first ATP match win of the year. He was defeated in the second round by Philipp Kohlschreiber. At the Australian Open, he fell in the first round to compatriot and future coach Jérémy Chardy in five thrilling sets. This match was the first match where a 10-point tiebreaker was used in the fifth set.

After the Australian Open, Humbert reached the semifinals in Quimper as the second seed, defeating Raúl Brancaccio, Oscar Otte and Tobias Kamke. He lost in the semifinals to Dan Evans. After this, he received a wildcard into Montpellier, where he lost to fellow wildcard Jo-Wilfried Tsonga in straight sets. At the challenger in Cherbourg, Humbert reached the final by defeating Elliot Benchetrit, Alexey Vatutin, Otte and Mats Moraing. He defeated qualifier Steve Darcis in the final to win his first challenger title of the year. The week after, Humbert was awarded a wildcard into Marseilles, where he defeated Ernests Gulbis, Borna Ćorić and Matthias Bachinger to reach his first tour-level semifinal, where he lost to Mikhail Kukushkin. From his success in France, Humbert entered the world's top 65.

Humbert made his debut in Indian Wells by qualifying for the main draw and Miami as a direct entrant. He lost in the first round of both to Maximilian Marterer and Mackenzie McDonald, respectively.

Humbert's clay season was less successful, as he had back to back losses in his main draw tournaments in Marrakech to Kyle Edmund and Munich to Taro Daniel. He also failed to qualify for any of the clay Masters tournaments, as he lost in Monte Carlo in the second round of qualifying to Andrey Rublev and Madrid in the first round to Roberto Carballés Baena. In Lyon, Humbert would pick up his only victory on clay in his year, beating Cameron Norrie in the first round before losing to Denis Shapovalov. At the French Open, Humbert lost to Alexei Popyrin in the first round.

On grass, Humbert began his season in Surbiton as the top seed. He lost to eventual finalist Viktor Troicki in the first round. The following week in Rosmalen, he lost in the first round to Robin Haase. Humbert found more success in Ilkley, where, as the second seed, he reached the quarterfinals, losing to eventual champion Dominik Köpfer, then more success in Wimbledon. There, he defeated 16th seed Gaël Monfils after coming back from two sets down after Monfils retired due to injury. Then, he defeated Marcel Granollers and 19th seed Félix Auger-Aliassime in straight sets to reach the fourth round of a Grand Slam for the first time in his career. He lost to world No. 1 and eventual champion, Novak Djokovic, in straight sets. Humbert's good form continued into Newport, where he reached his second semifinal of the year, beating Ramkumar Ramanathan and Ilya Ivashka. As a result of his grass court success, he made his debut in the top 50 after Wimbledon, rising to No. 46 after his run in Newport.

Outside of Newport, however, Humbert only played few tournaments in the U.S., winning in the first round in Atlanta against Colton Gromley and losing to Miomir Kecmanović in the second round, and winning in the first round in Winston-Salem against Bjorn Fratangelo before losing to top seed and eventual finalist Benoît Paire. In the US Open, he lost to Marius Copil in the first round.

After the US Open, Humbert played in Istanbul as the top seed. There, he defeated Marek Gengel, Hugo Grenier, Ruben Bemelmans and Blaž Kavčič to reach the second Challenger final of his year. There, he defeated Denis Istomin to win the title, claiming the second Challenger title of his year and fifth of his career. After the victory, however, Humbert lost two tournaments in a row in Metz to Yannick Maden and Orléans to Sergiy Stakhovsky, but then won his first match in Mouilleron le Captif against Robin Haase before losing to Jiří Veselý.

Humbert found success in the final few tournaments of his year. In Antwerp, he defeated Jozef Kovalík, then upset second seed and home favourite David Goffin in straight sets to reach the third ATP Tour-level quarterfinal of his season. He then defeated Guido Pella in the quarterfinals to advance to his third semifinal of the year, where he lost to eventual champion Andy Murray. After his run in Antwerp, Humbert played Brest, where, as the top seed, he defeated Maxime Janvier, Evgeny Karlovskiy, Antoine Hoang and Norbert Gombos to reach the final. There, he defeated Evgeny Donskoy to win his third Challenger title of the year and qualify for the 2019 Next Generation ATP Finals. Humbert finished his main season with a first-round loss in Paris to Grigor Dimitrov in three sets. At the Next Gen Finals in Milan, Humbert lost to Mikael Ymer and Frances Tiafoe before defeating eventual champion Jannik Sinner. He finished season ranked 57th in the world.

=== 2020: First two tour titles, top 30 ===
Humbert started the year at the Canberra Challenger. As the top seed, he lost in the third round to 15th seed Denis Kudla. He reached his first ATP Tour final at the ASB Classic, beating en route two top 20 players, Denis Shapovalov and John Isner. In the final, he beat his countryman, Benoît Paire, in three sets to win his first ATP Tour title. At the Australian Open, he was defeated in the first round by Australian John Millman.

Seeded eighth at the Open Sud de France, Humbert was eliminated in the first round by Feliciano López. Seeded fourth at the New York Open, he made it to the quarterfinals where he was beaten by sixth seed Miomir Kecmanović. Seeded sixth at the Delray Beach Open, he reached the semifinals where lost to Yoshihito Nishioka. At first, he had put on a show, beating Nishioka in the first set 6–1. However, in the second set, after a nearly 2 hour rain delay, he lost 6–4, and then the third set 6–0. Competing in Acapulco, he won his first-round match when his opponent, sixth seed and defending champion, Nick Kyrgios, retired due to a left wrist injury. He was defeated in the second round by eventual finalist, Taylor Fritz. As the top seed at the Oracle Challenger Series in Indian Wells, he was upset in the second round by eventual finalist, Jack Sock. The ATP Tour cancelled all tournaments from March through July due to the COVID-19 pandemic.

When the ATP resumed tournament play in August, Humbert played at the Western & Southern Open. This was held in New York this year not in Cincinnati due to COVID. He was eliminated in the first round by 14th seed Grigor Dimitrov. At the US Open, he was beaten in the second round by sixth seed and 2019 semifinalist, Matteo Berrettini.

In Rome, Humbert beat seventh seed and Italian, Fabio Fognini, in the second round. He lost in the third round to 12th seed Denis Shapovalov. At the Hamburg European Open, he knocked out top seed and world No. 5, Daniil Medvedev, in the first round. This win was his first over a top 10 player. He was defeated in the quarterfinals by Casper Ruud. At the French Open, he was eliminated in the first round by lucky loser Marc Polmans.

At the St. Petersburg Open in Russia, Humbert was beaten in the second round by third seed and eventual champion, Andrey Rublev. He won his second ATP title in Antwerp, beating eighth seed, Alex de Minaur, in the final. He competed in his final tournament of the season at the Paris Masters. Humbert claimed his second top-10 win by defeating second seed, Stefanos Tsitsipas, in the second round. He lost in the quarterfinals to tenth seed Milos Raonic, after having two match points. Following this run, he made his top 30 debut on 9 November 2020.

Humbert ended the year ranked 30.

=== 2021: First ATP 500 title, top 25 debut, injury and early end of season ===
Humbert began the 2021 season at the first edition of the Murray River Open. Seeded seventh, he lost in the second round to James Duckworth. Seeded 29th at the Australian Open, he was defeated in the second round by Australian, Nick Kyrgios, in a five-set thriller.

Seeded sixth at the Open Sud de France, Humbert reached the quarterfinals where he was eliminated by top seed and eventual finalist, Roberto Bautista Agut. In Rotterdam, he was beaten in the first round by qualifier Jérémy Chardy. Seeded fourth at the Open 13, he made it to the semifinals where he lost to compatriot Pierre-Hugues Herbert. Seeded 20th at the Miami Open, he was defeated in the third round by 12th seed Milos Raonic.

Starting his clay-court season at the Monte-Carlo Masters, Humbert was ousted from the tournament in the first round by John Millman. Seeded third at the Estoril Open, he reached the quarterfinals where he was beaten by eighth seed Alejandro Davidovich Fokina. At the Madrid Open, he lost in the first round to Aslan Karatsev. In Rome, he was defeated in the first round by Jannik Sinner. He was eliminated in the first round of the Lyon Open by Yoshihito Nishioka. Seeded 29th at the French Open, he lost in the first round by Ričardas Berankis.

Seeded sixth at the MercedesCup, his first grass-court tournament of the season, Humbert reached the quarterfinals where he lost to third seed and eventual finalist, Félix Auger-Aliassime. At the Halle Open, he won his first ATP 500 title by beating Sam Querrey, third seed Alexander Zverev, Sebastian Korda, Félix Auger-Aliassime, and fourth seed Andrey Rublev. As a result, he reached a career-high ATP ranking of No. 25 on 21 June 2021. Seeded seventh at the first edition of the Mallorca Championships, he withdrew from his second-round match against Sam Querrey due to food poisoning. Seeded 21st at Wimbledon, he was defeated in a first round thriller by Nick Kyrgios.

Representing France at the Summer Olympics, Humbert, the 14th seed, upset third seed, Stefanos Tsitsipas, in the third round. He was eliminated in the quarterfinals by 12th seed and eventual silver medalist, Karen Khachanov. In Toronto, he was beaten in the second round by third seed Tsitsipas. At the Western & Southern Open in Cincinnati, he lost in the first round to Frances Tiafoe. Seeded 23rd at the US Open, he was defeated in the first round by qualifier Peter Gojowczyk.

Seeded sixth at the Moselle Open, Humbert fell in the first round to Andy Murray. At the end of September, as the top seed at the Open d'Orléans, an ATP Challenger Tour event, he lost in the first round to compatriot Quentin Halys. On 1 November 2021, Humbert ended his season early due to injury, having withdrawn previously from Indian Wells, Antwerp and the Paris Masters.

Humbert ended the year ranked 35.

=== 2022: ATP Cup, Wimbledon third round, seventh Challenger ===
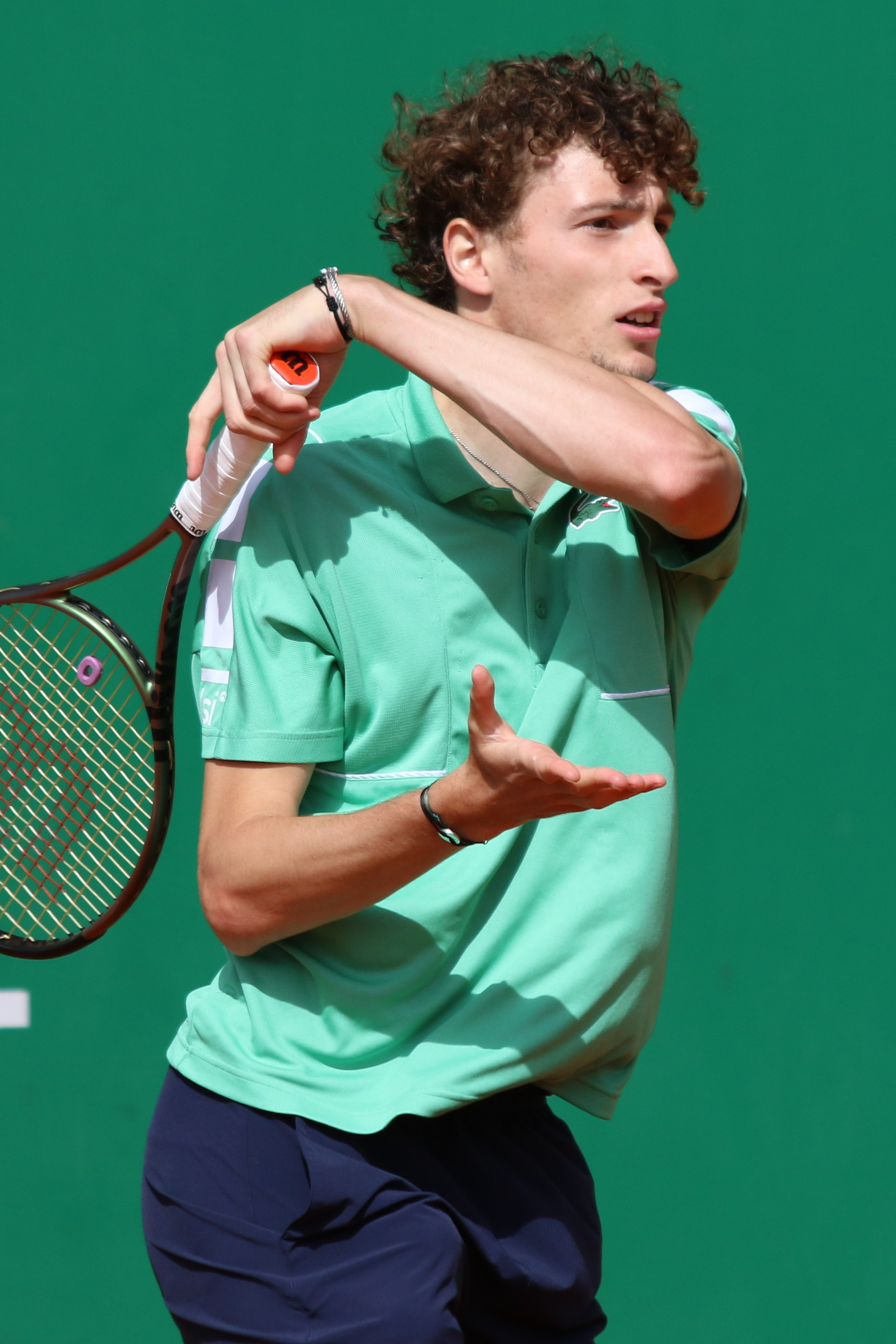
Humbert at the 2022 Monte-Carlo Masters

Humbert started his 2022 season at the ATP Cup. France was in Group B alongside Russia, Italy, and Australia. In his debut, he stunned world No. 2, Daniil Medvedev, for the biggest win of his career and first career win over a top 3 player. In his final two matches, he lost to Matteo Berrettini of Italy and Alex de Minaur of Australia. In the end, France ended fourth in Group B. Seeded 29th at the Australian Open, he was defeated in the first round by compatriot Richard Gasquet. Hours after his first-round exit, Humbert was told as he was exiting Australia that he had tested positive for COVID-19 and would need to isolate in the country.

Humbert returned to action on 2 February 2022 at the Open Sud de France in Montpellier. Seeded seventh, he lost in the first round to Richard Gasquet for the second time in two weeks. At the Rotterdam Open, he was eliminated in the first round by sixth seed and fellow leftie, Cameron Norrie. In March, Humbert competed at the Indian Wells Masters. He lost in round one to qualifier Holger Rune. At the Miami Open, he got his first win since 2 January by beating Aljaž Bedene in the first round. He lost in the second round to 29th seed Aslan Karatsev.

Starting his clay-court season at the Monte-Carlo Masters, Humbert lost in the first round to Pedro Martínez. In Barcelona, he was defeated in the second round by 10th seed and eventual semifinalist, Alex de Minaur, in three sets. At the Madrid Open, he fell in the final round of qualifying to Kwon Soon-woo. However, due to the withdrawal of Taylor Fritz due to a left foot injury, Humbert entered the main draw as a lucky loser. He lost in the first round to 14th seed Denis Shapovalov. At the Italian Open, he was defeated in the first round of qualifying by Brandon Nakashima. Playing his final tournament before the French Open at the Lyon Open, he lost in the second round to fourth seed de Minaur. This was his third straight loss to de Minaur. Ranked 46 at Roland Garros, he was beaten in the first round by Emil Ruusuvuori in five sets.

Humbert began his grass-court season at the BOSS Open in Stuttgart, Germany. Seeded eighth, he lost in the first round to compatriot Arthur Rinderknech. As the defending champion at the Halle Open, he was defeated in the second round by fifth seed and eventual champion, Hubert Hurkacz. Due to Humbert failing to defend the title in Halle, his ranking fell from 50 to out of the top 100 at No. 103. In Eastbourne, he was ousted from the tournament in the first round by qualifier Thiago Monteiro. Ranked No. 112 at Wimbledon, Humbert started off by beating Tomás Martín Etcheverry in the first round in five sets. In the second round, he upset world No. 6 and third seed, Casper Ruud, despite turning up to the match without any racquets. He lost in the third round to world No. 58, David Goffin, in four sets. He ended up his grass-court season playing in the 2022 Hall of Fame Open losing in the first round to Peter Gojowczyk.

As a result of poor form, several early rounds losses and not being able to get points at Wimbledon, his ranking plummeted out of the top 150 to No. 157 on 18 July 2022. In July and August, he reached three consecutive semifinals and a quarterfinal in Challengers and improved his ranking by close to 20 positions up to No. 138 on 29 August 2022. Following a first round exit at the US Open, in a tough five-setter loss against compatriot Bonzi, he won his seventh Challenger title at the 2022 Open de Rennes defeating wildcard Dominic Thiem and climbed close to 30 positions up to No. 110 on 19 September 2022. After a run to another Challenger semifinal at the 2022 Saint-Tropez Open, Humbert re-entered the top 100 on 17 October 2022.

He received a wildcard for the qualifying competition in his home tournament, the Paris Masters.

=== 2023: Major and Masters third rounds, French No. 1, fourth ATP title, top 20 ===
Humbert started his 2023 season at the Adelaide International 1. He fell in the first round of qualifying to Wu Yibing. Next, he competed at the ASB Classic. As the defending champion from when the event was last held in 2020, he was defeated in the first round by qualifier Christopher Eubanks. He reached the third round of the Australian Open for the first time at this Major defeating compatriot Richard Gasquet and lucky loser Denis Kudla. He lost in the third round to 9th seed and world No. 10, Holger Rune. As a result, his ranking moved 20 positions from No. 106 to No. 86 which put him back into the top 100.

Seeded third at the BW Open, Humbert was beaten in the first round by Belgian qualifier Gauthier Onclin. Representing France in the Davis Cup tie against Hungary, he won both of his matches by beating Márton Fucsovics and Fábián Marozsán. In the end, France won the tie over Hungary 3–2 to advance to the Davis Cup Finals. Playing as a wildcard at the Open Sud de France, he was forced to retire during his first-round match against fifth seed and friend, Alejandro Davidovich Fokina, due to a right leg injury after suffering a nasty fall. He returned to action during the week of 27 February at the Teréga Open Pau–Pyrénées. As the second seed, he reached the final where he lost to compatriot Luca Van Assche after having two match points, in 3 hours and 56 minutes, which set a record for the longest ATP Challenger final.

At the Indian Wells Open, he beat 25th seed and world No. 30, Denis Shapovalov, in the second round to reach the third round for the first time at this Masters. There, he lost to sixth seed and world No. 7, Andrey Rublev. In Miami, he was defeated in the second round by 29th seed and world No. 35, Miomir Kecmanović, in a tight three-set match. Seeded sixth he won the 2023 Sardegna Open Challenger 175 defeating fourth seed Laslo Djere. En route to the title, in the quarterfinals, he won the second longest best-of-three matches on the ITF circuit against Taro Daniel lasting close to four and a half hours. As a result, he returned to the top 50 on 8 May 2023. At the next Challenger 175 in Bordeaux, he again reached the final and became the French No. 1 ahead of Adrian Mannarino. He won the title with a win over Tomas Martin Etcheverry and returned to the top 40 in the rankings on 22 May 2023, for the first time since 31 January 2022. He won his first match at the 2023 French Open defeating compatriot Adrian Mannarino in straight sets.

He returned to the top 35 following a quarterfinal walkover against Grigor Dimitrov due to him being injured at the 2023 Citi Open on 7 August 2023.

Starting the Asian swing in Beijing, he reached the quarterfinals defeating sixth seed Andrey Rublev, his second win over the Russian, and eight career top-10 win overall. At the Shanghai Masters he reached the quarterfinals for only the second time in his career at the ATP Masters 1000 level, defeating fourth seed Stefanos Tsitsipas in the third round, his ninth career top-10 win, and JJ Wolf in the fourth. As a result, he returned to the top 30 in the rankings. Humbert lost in the quarterfinals to fifth seed Andrey Rublev. He reached the semifinals at the ATP 500 2023 Swiss Indoors but lost to Hubert Hurkacz. He reached the second round at his home tournament, the Paris Masters, defeating qualifier Marcos Giron and reached a new career high ranking in the top 25, returning to the French No. 1 position. He also reached the semifinals at the next home tournament, the 2023 Moselle Open in Metz defeating home favorite qualifier Harold Mayot. He reached his fourth career final defeating wildcard Fabio Fognini and eventually won the title triumphing over Alexander Shevchenko. As a result, he reached the top 20 in the singles rankings.

=== 2024: Second ATP 500 title, top 15, first Masters final ===
On home soil at the Open 13 Provence in Marseille, Humbert advanced to the final after defeating world No. 8 and top seed, Hubert Hurkacz, in the semifinals. He then defeated second seed Grigor Dimitrov to win his fifth title out of five finals. A few weeks later, Humbert won his sixth title, and second at the ATP 500 level, at the Dubai Championships, defeating seventh seed Alexander Bublik in the final. On doing so, he became the third man in the Open Era to win his first six ATP Tour finals, following Ernests Gulbis and Martin Kližan. En route, he defeated Gael Monfils and Andy Murray and two top 10 players in the quarterfinals and semifinals: No. 8 Hubert Hurkacz, saving three match points, and No. 4 Daniil Medvedev, the defending champion. As a result, he reached the top 15 in the singles rankings on 4 March 2024.

At the 2024 Monte-Carlo Masters he defeated Federico Coria, Zhang Zhizhen and lucky loser Lorenzo Sonego to reach his first clay Masters quarterfinal and only the third overall. He reached a new career-high of No. 13 in the singles rankings on 15 April 2024. However, he would not see the same success at any other clay court tournament he entered, and only won one other match at Madrid, and losing in the first round in Lyon and the French Open.

In the grass season, Humbert reached the semifinals at Rosmalen, but lost in the first round of Queen's Club and the second round of Mallorca as the second seed. At Wimbledon, Humbert reached the fourth round for the second time in his career, defeating Alexander Shevchenko, Botic van de Zandschulp and Brandon Nakashima before losing to Carlos Alcaraz. In the clay court tournament in Gstaad, Humbert lost in the second round to Gustavo Heide. At the Olympics, Humbert beat Fábián Marozsán, but lost to Francisco Cerúndolo in the second round.

He reached his seventh final at the 2024 Japan Open Tennis Championships, where he lost to compatriot Arthur Fils. This was notably the first final at tour level he had ever lost, having won a record first six.

Seeded 15th at the 2024 Rolex Paris Masters, Humbert beat Brandon Nakashima and Marcos Giron to reach the third round. There, he upset Carlos Alcaraz in three sets to reach his third Masters 1000 quarterfinal. Then, he beat Jordan Thompson and Karen Khachanov to reach his eighth final and first at a Masters 1000 level. He lost to Alexander Zverev.

=== 2025: Major fourth round, seventh ATP title ===
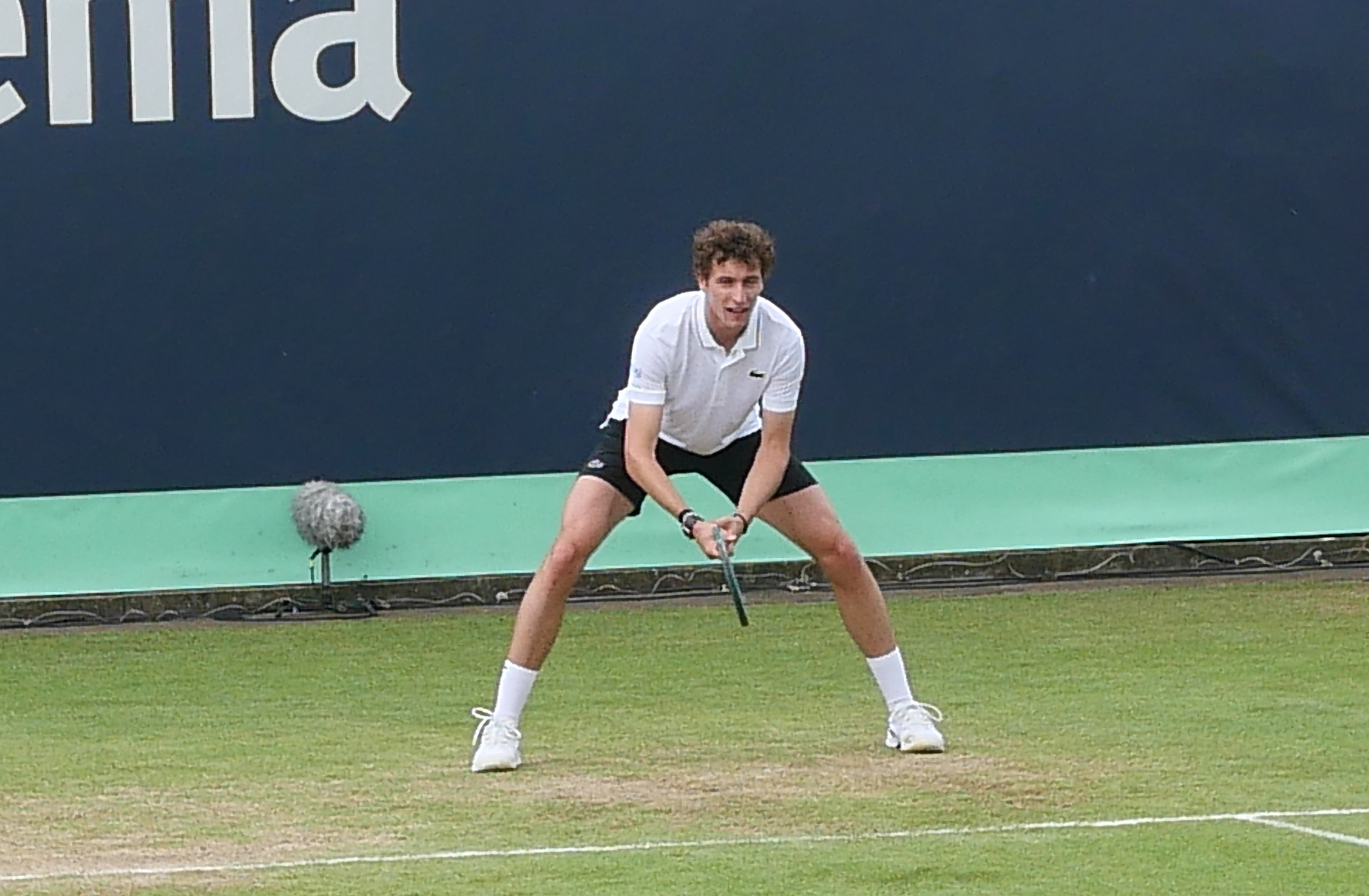
Ugo Humbert at the 2026 Libéma Open

Seeded 14th at the Australian Open, with wins over qualifiers Matteo Gigante and Hady Habib, followed by the retirement of 20th seed Arthur Fils, Humbert reached the fourth round. He lost to second seed Alexander Zverev in four sets.

Defending his title on home soil at the Open 13 Provence in Marseille, Humbert reached the final defeating Zizou Bergs in the semifinal.In the final he defeated Hamad Medjedovic in straight sets to win the title for second consecutive time.

At the 2025 Libéma Open Humbert reached the semifinals with a win over eight seed Nuno Borges. He lost to Gabriel Diallo in the semifinal.

At the Stockholm Open, Humbert reached the finals following the retirement of top seed Holger Rune in the semifinals. In the final he lost to second seed Casper Ruud. Humbert defeated top seed Taylor Fritz in the second round of 2025 Swiss Indoors - Singles to reach the semifinal. In the semifinal he retired against Alejandro Davidovich Fokina because of an injury. Humbert ended his season early after withdrawing from the 2025 Rolex Paris Masters where he was the previous year finalist.As a result of his Paris withdrawal he fell out of top 30 ending the year ranked 36.

=== 2026 ===
Humbert defeated top seed Alejandro Davidovich Fokina in the semifinal of Adelaide to reach his 11th ATP final where he was defeated by Tomas Machac in three sets.He defeated former World No.1 Daniil Medvedev in the first round of Rotterdam, he lost to eventual champion and top seed Alex de Minaur in the semifinals.He defeated Stefanos Tsitsipas in the first round of Dubai before losing to fifth seed Andrey Rublev.

He lost to eventual champion Ignacio Buse in the quarterfinals of Hamburg Open.He defeated Marin Cilic in the first round of Queen's Club, then he defeated Hamad Medjedovic and Rinky Hijikata before losing to Tommy Paul in the semifinal.

== Coaches ==
From late 2020 onwards to 2022, it was made clear the Humbert's main coach was Nicolas Copin, who coaches at the Allin Academy (tennis). He was also coached by Thierry Ascione, former top 100 tennis player from France. In the summer of 2022, it was revealed that Humbert had ended his coaching relationship with Copin.

From then on, Jérémy Chardy, also from France, who had been off the tour for a few months after revealing he (Chardy) had had a bad COVID-19 vaccine reaction, and was to be off the tour for more than a year, agreed to coach Humbert starting in July 2022. Humbert’s current physiotherapist is Laurent Tort, and he has worked with Holger Rune's physiotherapist Lapo Becherini in the past.

En route to his 2024 Open 13 Provence and Dubai titles he was also coached by his girlfriend and fellow tennis player Tessah Andrianjafitrimo.

In early 2025, it was announced that Humbert had amicably split with Chardy and Fabrice Martin was to take over the role. Martin started his coaching career as the French team captain at the 2025 United Cup which Humbert was a part of.

== Playing style ==
According to his former coach, Cédric Raynaud, Humbert is a true offensive player who likes to volley. His favourite shot is his backhand and his preferred surface is hard.

== Performance timelines ==
Key
W	F	SF	QF	#R	RR	Q#	P#	DNQ	A	Z#	PO	G	S	B	NMS	NTI	P	NH

(W) winner; (F) finalist; (SF) semifinalist; (QF) quarterfinalist; (#R) rounds 4, 3, 2, 1; (RR) round-robin stage; (Q#) qualification round; (P#) preliminary round; (DNQ) did not qualify; (A) absent; (Z#) Davis/Fed Cup Zonal Group (with number indication) or (PO) play-off; (G) gold, (S) silver or (B) bronze Olympic/Paralympic medal; (NMS) not a Masters tournament; (NTI) not a Tier I tournament; (P) postponed; (NH) not held; (SR) strike rate (events won / competed); (W–L) win–loss record.
To avoid confusion and double counting, these charts are updated at the conclusion of a tournament or when the player's participation has ended.

=== Singles ===
Tournament	2016	2017	2018	2019	2020	2021	2022	2023	2024	2025	2026	SR	W–L	Win %
Grand Slam tournaments
Australian Open	A	A	A	1R	1R	2R	1R	3R	3R	4R	1R	0 / 8	8–8	50%
French Open	A	A	Q1	1R	1R	1R	1R	2R	1R	2R	2R	0 / 8	3–8	27%
Wimbledon	A	A	Q1	4R	NH	1R	3R	1R	4R	1R	1R	0 / 7	8–7	53%
US Open	A	A	2R	1R	2R	1R	1R	1R	2R	1R	A	0 / 8	3–8	27%
Win–loss	0–0	0–0	1–1	3–4	1–3	1–4	2–4	3–4	6–4	4–4	1-3	0 / 31	22–31	42%
Year-end championships
ATP Finals	Did not qualify											0 / 0	0–0	–
National representation
Summer Olympics	A	Not Held				QF	Not Held		2R	Not Held		0 / 2	4–2	67%
Davis Cup	A	A	A	A	A	A	A		RR	RR		0 / 3	6–2	75%
ATP 1000
Indian Wells Open	A	A	A	1R	NH	A	1R	3R	3R	3R	2R	0 / 6	4–6	40%
Miami Open	A	A	A	1R	NH	3R	2R	2R	3R	2R	4R	0 / 7	6–7	46%
Monte-Carlo Masters	A	A	A	Q2	NH	1R	1R	1R	QF	1R	2R	0 / 6	4–6	40%
Madrid Open	A	A	A	Q1	NH	1R	1R	1R	2R	2R	2R	0 / 6	1–6	14%
Italian Open	A	A	A	A	3R	1R	Q1	1R	A	2R	3R	0 / 5	3–5	38%
Canadian Open	A	A	A	A	NH	2R	A	2R	2R	A	2R	0 / 4	3–4	43%
Cincinnati Open	A	A	A	A	1R	1R	A	2R	1R	3R	2R	0 / 6	2–6	25%
Shanghai Masters	A	A	A	A	NH			QF	3R	3R	2R	0 / 4	5–4	56%
Paris Masters	A	Q2	1R	1R	QF	A	Q1	2R	F	A	2R	0 / 6	10–6	60%
Win–loss	0–0	0–0	0–1	0–3	5–3	2–6	1–4	9–9	13–8	3–7	5–9	0 / 50	38–50	45%
Career statistics
	2016	2017	2018	2019	2020	2021	2022	2023	2024	2025	2026	Career		
Tournaments	0	0	3	22	14	21	20	24	26	20	16	166		
Titles	0	0	0	0	2	1	0	1	2	1	0	7		
Finals	0	0	0	0	2	1	0	1	4	2	1	11		
Overall win–loss	0–0	0–0	2–3	17–23	24–12	19–19	9–21	33–23	39–24	25–20	20-16	188–161		
Win %	–	–	40%	43%	67%	50%	30%	59%	62%	56%	56%	53.87%		
Year-end ranking	992	381	102	57	30	35	87	20	14	37		$11,519,852		

== ATP Masters 1000 finals ==
=== Singles: 1 (runner-up) ===
Result	Year	Tournament	Surface	Opponent	Score
Loss	2024	Paris Masters	Hard (i)	(Germany) Alexander Zverev	2–6, 2–6

== ATP Tour finals ==
=== Singles: 12 (7 titles, 5 runner-ups) ===
Legend Grand Slam (–) ATP 1000 (0–1) ATP 500 (2–1) ATP 250 (5–3)	Finals by surface Hard (6–4) Clay (–) Grass (1–1)	Finals by setting Outdoor (3–3) Indoor (4–2)

Result	W–L	Date	Tournament	Tier	Surface	Opponent	Score
Win	1–0	Jan 2020	Auckland Open, New Zealand	ATP 250	Hard	(France) Benoît Paire	7–6^{(7–2)}, 3–6, 7–6^{(7–5)}
Win	2–0	Oct 2020	European Open, Belgium	ATP 250	Hard (i)	(Australia) Alex de Minaur	6–1, 7–6^{(7–4)}
Win	3–0	Jun 2021	Halle Open, Germany	ATP 500	Grass	(Russia) Andrey Rublev	6–3, 7–6^{(7–4)}
Win	4–0	Nov 2023	Moselle Open, France	ATP 250	Hard (i)	Alexander Shevchenko	6–3, 6–3
Win	5–0	Feb 2024	Open 13, France	ATP 250	Hard (i)	(Bulgaria) Grigor Dimitrov	6–4, 6–3
Win	6–0	Mar 2024	Dubai Tennis Championships, UAE	ATP 500	Hard	(Kazakhstan) Alexander Bublik	6–4, 6–3
Loss	6–1	Oct 2024	Japan Open, Japan	ATP 500	Hard	(France) Arthur Fils	7–5, 6–7^{(6–8)}, 3–6
Loss	6–2	Nov 2024	Paris Masters, France	ATP 1000	Hard (i)	(Germany) Alexander Zverev	2–6, 2–6
Win	7–2	Feb 2025	Open 13, France (2)	ATP 250	Hard (i)	(Serbia) Hamad Medjedovic	7–6^{(7–4)}, 6–4
Loss	7–3	Oct 2025	Stockholm Open, Sweden	ATP 250	Hard (i)	(Norway) Casper Ruud	2–6, 3–6
Loss	7–4	Jan 2026	Adelaide International, Australia	ATP 250	Hard	(Czech Republic) Tomáš Macháč	4–6, 7–6^{(7–2)}, 2–6
Loss	7–5	Jun 2026	Eastbourne Open, UK	ATP 250	Grass	(Belgium) Zizou Bergs	6–3, 1–6, 4–6

=== Doubles: 1 (runner-up) ===
Legend Grand Slam (–) ATP 1000 (–) ATP 500 (–) ATP 250 (0–1)	Finals by surface Hard (–) Clay (0–1) Grass (–)	Finals by setting Outdoor (0–1) Indoor (–)

Result	W–L	Date	Tournament	Tier	Surface	Partner	Opponents	Score
Loss	0–1	Jul 2024	Swiss Open Gstaad, Switzerland	ATP 250	Clay	(France) Fabrice Martin	(India) Yuki Bhambri (France) Albano Olivetti	6–3, 3–6, [6–10]

== ATP Challenger Tour finals ==
=== Singles: 13 (9 titles, 4 runner-ups) ===
Legend ATP Challenger Tour (9–4)	Finals by surface Hard (7–4) Clay (2–0)

Result	W–L	Date	Tournament	Tier	Surface	Opponent	Score
Loss	0–1	Jul 2018	Challenger Nationale de Gatineau, Canada	Challenger	Hard	(United States) Bradley Klahn	3–6, 6–7^{(5–7)}
Loss	0–2	Jul 2018	Challenger Nationale de Granby, Canada	Challenger	Hard	(Canada) Peter Polansky	4–6, 6–1, 2–6
Win	1–2	Aug 2018	Open Castilla y León, Spain	Challenger	Hard	(Spain) Adrián Menéndez Maceiras	6–3, 6–4
Loss	1–3	Sep 2018	Cassis Open, France	Challenger	Hard	(France) Enzo Couacaud	2–6, 3–6
Win	2–3	Oct 2018	Sparkassen Challenger, Italy	Challenger	Hard (i)	(France) Pierre-Hugues Herbert	6–4, 6–2
Win	3–3	Nov 2018	Internazionali di Castel del Monte, Italy	Challenger	Hard (i)	(Italy) Filippo Baldi	6–4, 7–6^{(7–3)}
Win	4–3	Feb 2019	Challenger La Manche, France	Challenger	Hard (i)	(Belgium) Steve Darcis	6–7^{(6–8)}, 6–3, 6–3
Win	5–3	Sep 2019	Istanbul Challenger, Turkey	Challenger	Hard	(Uzbekistan) Denis Istomin	6–2, 6–2
Win	6–3	Oct 2019	Brest Challenger, France	Challenger	Hard (i)	(Russia) Evgeny Donskoy	6–2, 6–3
Win	7–3	Sep 2022	Open de Rennes, France	Challenger	Hard (i)	(Austria) Dominic Thiem	6–3, 6–0
Loss	7–4	Feb 2023	Open Pau–Pyrénées, France	Challenger	Hard (i)	(France) Luca Van Assche	6–7^{(5–7)}, 6–4, 6–7^{(6–8)}
Win	8–4	May 2023	Sardegna Open, Italy	Challenger	Clay	(Serbia) Laslo Djere	4–6, 7–5, 6–4
Win	9–4	May 2023	Primrose Bordeaux, France	Challenger	Clay	(Argentina) Tomás Martín Etcheverry	7–6^{(7–3)}, 6–4

== ITF Tour finals ==
=== Singles: 6 (4 titles, 2 runner-ups) ===
Legend ITF Futures (4–2)	Finals by surface Hard (2–1) Clay (1–0) Carpet (1–1)

Result	W–L	Date	Tournament	Tier	Surface	Opponent	Score
Loss	0–1	Oct 2015	France F20, Forbach	Futures	Carpet (i)	(Germany) Jan Choinski	3–6, 6–7^{(2–7)}
Loss	0–2	Mar 2017	Egypt F8, Sharm El Sheikh	Futures	Hard	(Bosnia and Herzegovina) Aldin Šetkić	3–6, 4–6
Win	1–2	Sep 2017	France F18, Bagnères-de-Bigorre	Futures	Hard	(United Kingdom) Edward Corrie	7–5, 2–6, 7–6^{(7–4)}
Win	2–2	Feb 2018	Switzerland F2, Bellevue	Futures	Carpet (i)	(Belgium) Niels Desein	6–7^{(2–7)}, 7–6^{(7–5)}, 6–3
Win	3–2	Mar 2018	Canada F1, Gatineau	Futures	Hard (i)	(United States) Strong Kirchheimer	6–4, 6–0
Win	4–2	Jul 2018	France F12, Bourg-en-Bresse	Futures	Clay	(France) Antoine Cornut-Chauvinc	6–3, 6–3

=== Doubles: 6 (3 titles, 3 runner-ups) ===
Legend ITF Futures (3–3)	Finals by surface Hard (1–1) Clay (2–2)

Result	W–L	Date	Tournament	Tier	Surface	Partner	Opponents	Score
Loss	0–1	Aug 2016	Belgium F8, Ostend	Futures	Clay	(France) Evan Furness	(Netherlands) Paul Monteban (Netherlands) Botic van de Zandschulp	6–3, 5–7, [5–10]
Loss	0–2	Jul 2017	France F17, Troyes	Futures	Clay	(France) Constant de la Bassetière	(France) Antoine Hoang (France) Grégoire Jacq	4–6, 0–6
Win	1–2	Aug 2017	Belarus F2, Minsk	Futures	Hard	(France) Maxime Cressy	(Ukraine) Vadym Ursu (Belarus) Ivan Liutarevich	4–6, 6–3, [10–5]
Loss	1–3	Oct 2017	France F24, Rodez	Futures	Hard	(France) Antoine Hoang	(United States) Alex Lawson (United States) Nathaniel Lammons	6–7^{(4–7)}, 6–4, [7–10]
Win	2–3	Jul 2018	France F11, Montauban	Futures	Clay	(United States) Ulises Blanch	(Argentina) Patricio Heras (Argentina) Gonzalo Villanueva	6–3, 3–6, [10–6]
Win	3–3	Jul 2018	France F12, Bourg-en-Bresse	Futures	Clay	(France) Dan Added	(France) Jérôme Inzerillo (France) Alexis Musialek	2–6, 6–1, [10–5]

== Wins over top-10 players ==
- Humbert has a 14–18 record against players who were, at the time the match was played, ranked in the top 10.

Season	2016	2017	2018	2019	2020	2021	2022	2023	2024	2025	Total
Wins	0	0	0	0	2	3	2	2	4	1	14

#	Player	Rk	Event	Surface	Rd	Score	Rk
2020
1.	(Russia) Daniil Medvedev	5	Hamburg Open, Germany	Clay	1R	6–4, 6–3	41
2.	(Greece) Stefanos Tsitsipas	6	Paris Masters, France	Hard (i)	2R	7–6^{(7–4)}, 6–7^{(6–8)}, 7–6^{(7–3)}	34
2021
3.	(Germany) Alexander Zverev	6	Halle Open, Germany	Grass	2R	7–6^{(7–4)}, 3–6, 6–3	31
4.	(Russia) Andrey Rublev	7	Halle Open, Germany	Grass	F	6–3, 7–6^{(7–4)}	31
5.	(Greece) Stefanos Tsitsipas	4	Tokyo Olympics, Japan	Hard	3R	2–6, 7–6^{(7–4)}, 6–2	28
2022
6.	(Russia) Daniil Medvedev	2	ATP Cup, Sydney, Australia	Hard	RR	6–7^{(5–7)}, 7–5, 7–6^{(7–2)}	35
7.	(Norway) Casper Ruud	6	Wimbledon, United Kingdom	Grass	2R	3–6, 6–2, 7–5, 6–4	112
2023
8.	Andrey Rublev	6	China Open, China	Hard	2R	5–7, 6–3, 7–6^{(7–3)}	36
9.	(Greece) Stefanos Tsitsipas	6	Shanghai Masters, China	Hard	3R	6–4, 3–6, 7–5	34
2024
10.	(Poland) Hubert Hurkacz	8	Open 13, France	Hard (i)	SF	6–4, 6–4	21
11.	(Poland) Hubert Hurkacz	8	Dubai Tennis Championships, UAE	Hard	QF	3–6, 7–6^{(10–8)}, 6–3	18
12.	Daniil Medvedev	4	Dubai Tennis Championships, UAE	Hard	SF	7–5, 6–3	18
13.	(Spain) Carlos Alcaraz	2	Paris Masters, France	Hard (i)	3R	6–1, 3–6, 7–5	18
2025
14.	(United States) Taylor Fritz	4	Swiss Indoors, Switzerland	Hard (i)	2R	6–3, 6–4	24

== Records ==
Event	Years	Record accomplished	Players matched
ATP Tour	2020–24	First six tournament finals won	Ernests Gulbis; Martin Kližan
