= 2024 Cassis Open Provence =

- Date: 2–8 September
- Edition: 6th
- Surface: Hard
- Location: Cassis, France

Champions

Singles
- (France) Richard Gasquet

Doubles
- (Portugal) Jaime Faria / (Portugal) Henrique Rocha
- Cassis Open Provence

The 2024 Cassis Open Provence was a professional tennis tournament played on hard courts. It was the sixth edition of the tournament which was part of the 2024 ATP Challenger Tour. It took place in Cassis, France between 2 and 8 September 2024.

== Singles main-draw entrants ==
=== Seeds ===
Country	Player	Rank^{1}	Seed
FRA	Constant Lestienne	111	1
FRA	Benjamin Bonzi	129	2
FRA	Richard Gasquet	136	3
ARG	Marco Trungelliti	141	4
FRA	Titouan Droguet	146	5
FRA	Ugo Blanchet	148	6
POR	Jaime Faria	155	7
POR	Henrique Rocha	164	8

- ^{1} Rankings are as of 26 August 2024.

=== Other entrants ===
The following players received wildcards into the singles main draw:

- (Croatia) Marin Čilić
- (France) Richard Gasquet
- (France) Maé Malige

The following player received entry into the singles main draw as an alternate:

- (United Kingdom) Alastair Gray

The following players received entry from the qualifying draw:

- (France) Dan Added
- (United Kingdom) Kyle Edmund
- (France) Sascha Gueymard Wayenburg
- (France) Laurent Lokoli
- (France) Damien Salvestre
- (Colombia) Adrià Soriano Barrera

The following players received entry as lucky losers:

- (France) Jules Marie
- (France) Lucas Poullain

== Champions ==
=== Singles ===
- (France) Richard Gasquet def. (Austria) Jurij Rodionov 3–6, 6–1, 6–2.

=== Doubles ===
- (Portugal) Jaime Faria / (Portugal) Henrique Rocha def. (France) Manuel Guinard / (France) Matteo Martineau 7–6^{(7–5)}, 6–4.
