= 2023 Cassis Open Provence – Doubles =

Doubles
- 2023 Cassis Open Provence

Final
- Champions: (France) Dan Added (France) Jonathan Eysseric
- Runners-up: (United Kingdom) Liam Broady (France) Antoine Hoang
- Score: 6–0, 4–6, [11–9]

Events
Singles	Doubles
- Cassis Open Provence

Michael Geerts and Joran Vliegen were the defending champions but chose not to defend their title.

Dan Added and Jonathan Eysseric won the title after defeating Liam Broady and Antoine Hoang 6–0, 4–6, [11–9] in the final.

== Seeds ==
1. (France) Dan Added / (France) Jonathan Eysseric (champions)
2. (Austria) Maximilian Neuchrist / (Netherlands) Sem Verbeek (first round)
3. (United Kingdom) Scott Duncan / (United Kingdom) Marcus Willis (semifinals)
4. (United Kingdom) Charles Broom / (United Kingdom) Ben Jones (quarterfinals)

== Draw ==
Key

- Q = Qualifier
- WC = Wild card
- LL = Lucky loser
- Alt = Alternate
- ITF = ITF entry
- PR = Protected ranking
- SR = Special ranking
- SE = Special exempt
- JE = Junior exempt
- JR = Junior Accelerator Programme entrant
- CO = College Accelerator Programme entrant
- NG = Next Gen Accelerator Program entrant
- w/o = Walkover
- r = Retired
- d = Defaulted

First round
1	(France) D Added (France) J Eysseric	7	6
(Colombia) A Soriano Barrera (Israel) R Stepanov	5	3
(Croatia) Z Babić (Bulgaria) A Donski	7^{11}	6
Alt	(Morocco) E Benchetrit; A Vatutin	6^{9}	4
3	(United Kingdom) S Duncan (United Kingdom) M Willis	6	7^{7}
(New Zealand) F Reynolds (New Zealand) A Sitak	1	6^{2}
WC	(France) Paul Ambrosino (France) David Couronne	0	5
(United Kingdom) A McHugh (United States) H Reese	6	7
(United Kingdom) B Harris (Australia) A Taylor	7	6
(Canada) JC Aguilar (Antigua and Barbuda) J Maginley	5	3
WC	(France) Hugo Cardinaud (France) Pierre Antoine Tailleu	4	6	[7]
4	(United Kingdom) C Broom (United Kingdom) B Jones	6	3	[10]
(Colombia) N Mejía (Peru) A Merino	6	6
(France) U Blanchet (France) L Poullain	3	2
(United Kingdom) L Broady (France) A Hoang	2	7^{7}	[10]
2	(Austria) M Neuchrist (Netherlands) S Verbeek	6	6^{4}	[3]

Quarterfinals
1	(France) D Added (France) J Eysseric	4	6	[10]
(Croatia) Z Babić (Bulgaria) A Donski	6	3	[8]
3	(United Kingdom) S Duncan (United Kingdom) M Willis	6	6
(United Kingdom) A McHugh (United States) H Reese	1	0
(United Kingdom) B Harris (Australia) A Taylor	6	7^{7}
4	(United Kingdom) C Broom (United Kingdom) B Jones	3	6^{1}
(Colombia) N Mejía (Peru) A Merino	1	2
(United Kingdom) L Broady (France) A Hoang	6	6

Semifinals
1	(France) D Added (France) J Eysseric	6	7^{7}
3	(United Kingdom) S Duncan (United Kingdom) M Willis	3	6^{3}
(United Kingdom) B Harris (Australia) A Taylor	2	5
(United Kingdom) L Broady (France) A Hoang	6	7

Final
1	(France) D Added (France) J Eysseric	6	4	[11]
(United Kingdom) L Broady (France) A Hoang	0	6	[9]
