= 2026 Cassis Open Provence =

- Date: 7–13 September
- Edition: 8th
- Surface: Hard
- Location: Cassis, France

Champions

Singles
- (France) Titouan Droguet

Doubles
- (France) Dan Added / (Germany) Daniel Masur
- Cassis Open Provence

The 2026 Cassis Open Provence was a professional tennis tournament played on hard courts. It was the eighth edition of the tournament which was part of the 2026 ATP Challenger Tour. It took place in Cassis, France between 7 and 13 September 2026.

== Singles main-draw entrants ==
=== Seeds ===
Country	Player	Rank^{1}	Seed
FRA	Titouan Droguet	103	1
AUT	Jurij Rodionov	143	2
NOR	Nicolai Budkov Kjær	149	3
EST	Mark Lajal	152	4
EST	Daniil Glinka	156	5
BEL	Gauthier Onclin	158	6
GBR	Billy Harris	161	7
FRA	Ugo Blanchet	199	8

- ^{1} Rankings are as of 31 August 2026.

=== Other entrants ===
The following players received wildcards into the singles main draw:

- (France) Lenny Couturier
- (France) Laurent Lokoli
- (France) Maé Malige

The following players received entry into the singles main draw as alternates:

- (Netherlands) Gijs Brouwer
- (France) Maxime Chazal
- (Germany) Daniel Masur
- (United Kingdom) Ryan Peniston

The following players received entry from the qualifying draw:

- (France) Matisse Bobichon
- (India) Manas Dhamne
- (France) Yanis Ghazouani Durand
- (France) Maxime Janvier
- (France) Benjamin Pietri
- (France) Mathieu Scaglia

== Champions ==
=== Singles ===
- (France) Titouan Droguet def. (Estonia) Mark Lajal 6–4, 7–6^{(7–3)}.

=== Doubles ===
- (France) Dan Added / (Germany) Daniel Masur def. (United Kingdom) Tom Hands / (United Kingdom) Matthew Summers 6–4, 6–2.
