= 2018 Cassis Open Provence =

- Date: 4–9 September
- Edition: 1st
- Surface: Hard
- Location: Cassis, France

Champions

Singles
- (France) Enzo Couacaud

Doubles
- (Australia) Matt Reid / (Ukraine) Sergiy Stakhovsky
- Cassis Open Provence

The 2018 Cassis Open Provence was a professional tennis tournament played on hard courts. It was the 1st edition of the tournament which was part of the 2018 ATP Challenger Tour. It took place in Cassis, France between 4 and 9 September 2018.

== Singles main-draw entrants ==
=== Seeds ===
Country	Player	Rank^{1}	Seed
LTU	Ričardas Berankis	104	1
FRA	Corentin Moutet	112	2
ESP	Adrián Menéndez Maceiras	114	3
UKR	Sergiy Stakhovsky	138	4
FRA	Ugo Humbert	139	5
AUS	Bernard Tomic	152	6
FRA	Grégoire Barrère	153	7
GER	Mats Moraing	154	8

- ^{1} Rankings are as of 27 August 2018.

=== Other entrants ===
The following players received wildcards into the singles main draw:

- (France) Elliot Benchetrit
- (France) Mathias Bourgue
- (France) Alexandre Müller
- (France) Arthur Rinderknech

The following players received entry from the qualifying draw:

- (France) Enzo Couacaud
- (United Kingdom) Dan Evans
- (France) Jonathan Kanar
- (France) Tak Khunn Wang

== Champions ==
=== Singles ===
- (France) Enzo Couacaud def. (France) Ugo Humbert 6–2, 6–3.

=== Doubles ===
- (Australia) Matt Reid / (Ukraine) Sergiy Stakhovsky def. (Switzerland) Marc-Andrea Hüsler / (Portugal) Gonçalo Oliveira 6–2, 6–3.
