= Cassis Open Provence =

- 2025 Cassis Open Provence

ATP Challenger Tour
- Event name: Cassis Open Provence
- Location: Cassis, France
- Venue: Tennis Sporting Club de Cassis Les Gorguettes
- Category: ATP Challenger Tour
- Surface: Hard
- Draw: 32S/32Q/16D
- Website: website

The Cassis Open Provence is a professional tennis tournament played on hardcourts. It is currently part of the ATP Challenger Tour. It has been held in Cassis, France since 2018.

== Past finals ==
=== Singles ===
| Year | Champion | Runner-up | Score |
|---|---|---|---|
| 2026 | (France) Titouan Droguet | (Estonia) Mark Lajal | 6–4, 7–6^{(7–3)} |
| 2025 | (United Kingdom) Billy Harris | (Estonia) Daniil Glinka | 3–6, 7–5, 6–3 |
| 2024 | (France) Richard Gasquet | (Austria) Jurij Rodionov | 3–6, 6–1, 6–2 |
| 2023 | (Italy) Mattia Bellucci | (Czech Republic) Tomáš Macháč | 6–3, 6–4 |
| 2022 | (France) Hugo Grenier | (Australia) James Duckworth | 7–5, 6–4 |
| 2021 | (France) Benjamin Bonzi | (France) Lucas Pouille | 7–6^{(7–4)}, 6–4 |
| 2020 | Not Held | | |
| 2019 | (France) Jo-Wilfried Tsonga | (Israel) Dudi Sela | 6–1, 6–0 |
| 2018 | (France) Enzo Couacaud | (France) Ugo Humbert | 6–2, 6–3 |

=== Doubles ===
| Year | Champions | Runners-up | Score |
|---|---|---|---|
| 2026 | (France) Dan Added (Germany) Daniel Masur | (United Kingdom) Tom Hands (United Kingdom) Matthew Summers | 6–4, 6–2 |
| 2025 | (Austria) David Pichler (Austria) Jurij Rodionov | (France) Arthur Reymond (France) Luca Sanchez | 7–6^{(7–2)}, 6–4 |
| 2024 | (Portugal) Jaime Faria (Portugal) Henrique Rocha | (France) Manuel Guinard (France) Matteo Martineau | 7–6^{(7–5)}, 6–4 |
| 2023 | (France) Dan Added (France) Jonathan Eysseric | (United Kingdom) Liam Broady (France) Antoine Hoang | 6–0, 4–6, [11–9] |
| 2022 | (Belgium) Michael Geerts (Belgium) Joran Vliegen | (Monaco) Romain Arneodo (France) Albano Olivetti | 6–4, 7–6^{(8–6)} |
| 2021 | (India) Sriram Balaji (India) Ramkumar Ramanathan | (Mexico) Hans Hach Verdugo (Mexico) Miguel Ángel Reyes-Varela | 6–4, 3–6, [10–6] |
| 2020 | Not Held | | |
| 2019 | (Sweden) André Göransson (Netherlands) Sem Verbeek | (Netherlands) Sander Arends (Netherlands) David Pel | 7–6^{(8–6)}, 4–6, [11–9] |
| 2018 | (Australia) Matt Reid (Ukraine) Sergiy Stakhovsky | (Switzerland) Marc-Andrea Hüsler (Portugal) Gonçalo Oliveira | 6–2, 6–3 |
