= 2012 Open de Rennes – Doubles =

Doubles
- 2012 Open de Rennes

Final
- Champions: (Germany) Philipp Marx (Romania) Florin Mergea
- Runners-up: (Poland) Tomasz Bednarek (Poland) Mateusz Kowalczyk
- Score: 6–3, 6–2

Events
Singles	Doubles
← 2011 ·	Open de Rennes	· 2013 →

Martin Emmrich and Andreas Siljeström were the defending champions but decided not to participate.
Philipp Marx and Florin Mergea won the title, defeating Tomasz Bednarek and Mateusz Kowalczyk 6–3, 6–2 in the final.

== Seeds ==
1. (France) Pierre-Hugues Herbert / (France) Michaël Llodra (quarterfinals, withdrew)
2. (Sweden) Johan Brunström / (South Africa) Raven Klaasen (quarterfinals)
3. (Poland) Tomasz Bednarek / (Poland) Mateusz Kowalczyk (final)
4. (Germany) Philipp Marx / (Romania) Florin Mergea (champions)

== Draw ==
=== Key ===
- Q = Qualifier
- WC = Wild card
- LL = Lucky loser
- Alt = Alternate
- SE = Special exempt
- PR = Protected ranking
- ITF = ITF entry
- JE = Junior exempt
- w/o = Walkover
- r = Retired
- d = Defaulted
- SR = Special ranking

=== Draw ===
First round
1	(France) P-H Herbert (France) M Llodra	7	6
(United Kingdom) D Rice (United Kingdom) S Thornley	5	3
(Belgium) M Authom (Belgium) Y Mertens	3	5
(France) M Gicquel (France) A Olivetti	6	7
3	(Poland) T Bednarek (Poland) M Kowalczyk	7^{8}	7
(Croatia) M Draganja (Croatia) L Zovko	6^{6}	5
(Argentina) F Delbonis (Spain) C Poch-Gradin	7^{7}	7
WC	(Serbia) D Petrović (Germany) Sami Reinwein	6^{5}	5
(Slovenia) A Bedene (Australia) C Ebelthite	6	6
(Serbia) F Krajinović (Poland) M Przysiężny	4	3
(France) F Martin (France) Julien Obry	3	6^{11}
4	(Germany) P Marx (Romania) F Mergea	6	7^{13}
WC	(France) Alexandre David (France) Constant Lestienne	1	2
(Belgium) N Desein (Germany) P Torebko	6	6
(Belgium) Arnaud Gerard (France) Glenn le Floch-Moen	2	1
2	(Sweden) J Brunström (South Africa) R Klaasen	6	6

Quarterfinals
1	(France) P-H Herbert (France) M Llodra
(France) M Gicquel (France) A Olivetti	w/o
3	(Poland) T Bednarek (Poland) M Kowalczyk	6	6
(Argentina) F Delbonis (Spain) C Poch-Gradin	4	3
(Slovenia) A Bedene (Australia) C Ebelthite	1	5
4	(Germany) P Marx (Romania) F Mergea	6	7
(Belgium) N Desein (Germany) P Torebko	7^{7}	6
2	(Sweden) J Brunström (South Africa) R Klaasen	6^{4}	4

Semifinals
(France) M Gicquel (France) A Olivetti	6^{4}	4
3	(Poland) T Bednarek (Poland) M Kowalczyk	7^{7}	6
4	(Germany) P Marx (Romania) F Mergea	6	6
(Belgium) N Desein (Germany) P Torebko	3	2

Final
3	(Poland) T Bednarek (Poland) M Kowalczyk	3	2
4	(Germany) P Marx (Romania) F Mergea	6	6
