= 2018 Open de Rennes – Singles =

Singles
- 2018 Open de Rennes

Final
- Champion: (Canada) Vasek Pospisil
- Runner-up: (Lithuania) Ričardas Berankis
- Score: 6–1, 6–2

Events
Singles	Doubles
← 2017 ·	Open de Rennes	· 2019 →

Uladzimir Ignatik was the defending champion but lost in the first round to Alexey Vatutin.

Vasek Pospisil won the title after defeating Ričardas Berankis 6–1, 6–2 in the final.

== Seeds ==
1. (Russia) Mikhail Youzhny (second round)
2. (Canada) Vasek Pospisil (champion)
3. (Portugal) Gastão Elias (first round)
4. (Ukraine) Sergiy Stakhovsky (first round)
5. (Germany) Dustin Brown (first round)
6. (France) Quentin Halys (quarterfinals)
7. (Lithuania) Ričardas Berankis (final)
8. (Slovakia) Norbert Gombos (second round)

== Draw ==
=== Key ===
- Q = Qualifier
- WC = Wild card
- LL = Lucky loser
- Alt = Alternate
- SE = Special exempt
- PR = Protected ranking
- ITF = ITF entry
- JE = Junior exempt
- w/o = Walkover
- r = Retired
- d = Defaulted
- SR = Special ranking

=== Finals ===
Semifinals
7/Alt	(Lithuania) Ričardas Berankis	7	6
(United Kingdom) Liam Broady	5	1
Q	(France) Antoine Hoang	4	6^{4}
2	(Canada) Vasek Pospisil	6	7^{7}

Final
7/Alt	(Lithuania) Ričardas Berankis	1	2
2	(Canada) Vasek Pospisil	6	6

=== Top half ===
First round
1	(Russia) M Youzhny	6	6
(France) C Moutet	1	2
(France) G Sakharov	6	4	6
WC	(France) U Humbert	3	6	3
(Italy) S Bolelli	6	7^{7}
(Austria) S Ofner	2	6^{1}
(France) M Bourgue	3	4
7/Alt	(Lithuania) R Berankis	6	6
3	(Portugal) G Elias	1	4
WC	(France) M Guinard	6	6
Q	(Sweden) M Ymer	7^{7}	5	2
WC	(Latvia) E Gulbis	6^{4}	7	6
WC	(France) M Janvier	7^{7}	6
(Spain) T Robredo	6^{5}	4
(United Kingdom) L Broady	6	4	7
5	(Germany) D Brown	3	6	5

Second round
1	(Russia) M Youzhny	4	1
(France) G Sakharov	6	6
(Italy) S Bolelli	5	3
7/Alt	(Lithuania) R Berankis	7	6
WC	(France) M Guinard	3	6	6
WC	(Latvia) E Gulbis	6	3	4
WC	(France) M Janvier	4	1
(United Kingdom) L Broady	6	6

Quarterfinals
(France) G Sakharov	1	6	4
7/Alt	(Lithuania) R Berankis	6	4	6
WC	(France) M Guinard	4	4
(United Kingdom) L Broady	6	6

Semifinals
7/Alt	(Lithuania) R Berankis	7	6
(United Kingdom) L Broady	5	1

=== Bottom half ===
First round
8	(Slovakia) N Gombos	6	6
(France) K de Schepper	2	3
(Belgium) A De Greef	6^{7}	6	3
Q	(France) A Hoang	7^{9}	3	6
(Serbia) N Milojević	7^{7}	2	4
(Germany) Y Maden	6^{5}	6	6
(Sweden) E Ymer	6	3	6
4	(Ukraine) S Stakhovsky	1	6	3
6	(France) Q Halys	6	7^{7}
Q	(France) T Lamasine	1	6^{5}
(Russia) A Vatutin	6	6
(Belarus) U Ignatik	1	4
SE	(Germany) M Moraing	6^{5}	6	6
(France) C Hemery	7^{7}	1	4
Q	(Japan) Y Uchiyama	3	4
2	(Canada) V Pospisil	6	6

Second round
8	(Slovakia) N Gombos	2	6	3
Q	(France) A Hoang	6	4	6
(Germany) Y Maden	6	6
(Sweden) E Ymer	4	4
6	(France) Q Halys	4	6	7^{10}
(Russia) A Vatutin	6	4	6^{8}
SE	(Germany) M Moraing	6^{4}	6^{0}
2	(Canada) V Pospisil	7^{7}	7^{7}

Quarterfinals
Q	(France) A Hoang	6	3	6
(Germany) Y Maden	3	6	2
6	(France) Q Halys	1	4
2	(Canada) V Pospisil	6	6

Semifinals
Q	(France) A Hoang	4	6^{4}
2	(Canada) V Pospisil	6	7^{7}
