= 2009 Open de Rennes – Singles =

Singles
- 2009 Open de Rennes

Final
- Champion: (Colombia) Alejandro Falla
- Runner-up: (France) Thierry Ascione
- Score: 6–3, 6–2

Events
Singles	Doubles
← 2008 ·	Open de Rennes	· 2010 →

Josselin Ouanna was the defending champion, but retired in the second round match against Stefano Galvani while scores were 6–7^{(1–7)}, 7–6^{(7–4)}.

Alejandro Falla won this tournament, by defeating Thierry Ascione 6–3, 6–2 in the final.

== Seeds ==
1. (France) Josselin Ouanna (second round, retired due to left thigh injury)
2. (Germany) Daniel Brands (second round)
3. (Australia) Carsten Ball (first round, retired due to lower back pain)
4. (South Africa) Kevin Anderson (quarterfinals)
5. (Colombia) Alejandro Falla (champion)
6. (France) Arnaud Clément (first round)
7. (France) Stéphane Robert (first round)
8. (Brazil) Thiago Alves (first round)

== Draw ==
=== Key ===
- Q = Qualifier
- WC = Wild card
- LL = Lucky loser
- Alt = Alternate
- ITF = ITF entry
- PR = Protected ranking
- SR = Special ranking
- SE = Special exempt
- JE = Junior exempt
- JR = Junior Accelerator Programme entrant
- CO = College Accelerator Programme entrant
- NG = Next Gen Accelerator Program entrant
- w/o = Walkover
- r = Retired
- d = Defaulted

=== Finals ===
Semifinals
(France) David Guez	2	6^{6}
5	(Colombia) Alejandro Falla	6	7^{7}
(Germany) Dieter Kindlmann	6^{3}	6^{4}
(France) Thierry Ascione	7^{7}	7^{7}

Final
5	(Colombia) Alejandro Falla	6	6
(France) Thierry Ascione	3	2

=== Top half ===
First round
1	(France) J Ouanna	7	7
(Slovakia) P Červenák	5	5
(Czech Republic) L Rosol	1	4
(Italy) S Galvani	6	6
(Belgium) D Goffin	6^{7}	6	6^{3}
WC	(France) C-A Brézac	7^{9}	3	7^{7}
(France) D Guez	6	6
6	(France) A Clément	3	3
3	(Australia) C Ball	2	r
Q	(Australia) R Junaid	6
(France) N Mahut	2	6	4
(Belgium) X Malisse	6	3	6
(Slovakia) D Hrbatý	7^{7}	6
WC	(France) R Jouan	6^{5}	4
WC	(France) G Mina	1	2
5	(Colombia) A Falla	6	6

Second round
1	(France) J Ouanna	7^{7}	6^{4}	r
(Italy) S Galvani	6^{1}	7^{7}
WC	(France) C-A Brézac	3	6	3
(France) D Guez	6	0	6
Q	(Australia) R Junaid	4	4
(Belgium) X Malisse	6	6
(Slovakia) D Hrbatý	6	4	1
5	(Colombia) A Falla	2	6	6

Quarterfinals
(Italy) S Galvani	3	6	3
(France) D Guez	6	2	6
(Belgium) X Malisse	6^{5}	6	2
5	(Colombia) A Falla	7^{7}	3	6

Semifinals
(France) D Guez	2	6^{6}
5	(Colombia) A Falla	6	7^{8}

=== Bottom half ===
First round
7	(France) S Robert	6	3	6^{8}
(France) A Sidorenko	2	6	7^{10}
(Germany) D Kindlmann	3	6	6
(Czech Republic) P Šnobel	6	4	4
(France) V Millot	3	3
(Germany) J Reister	6	6
(France) O Patience	6^{6}	2
4	(South Africa) K Anderson	7^{8}	6
8	(Brazil) T Alves	0	7^{7}	1
Q	(Morocco) R Chaki	6	6^{5}	6
Q	(Poland) J Janowicz	3	3
(Czech Republic) J Minář	6	6
WC	(France) J Obry	2	4
(France) T Ascione	6	6
Q	(France) J Haehnel	2	2
2	(Germany) D Brands	6	6

Second round
(France) A Sidorenko	3	2
(Germany) D Kindlmann	6	6
(Germany) J Reister	6^{3}	6^{3}
4	(South Africa) K Anderson	7^{7}	7^{7}
Q	(Morocco) R Chaki	3	3
(Czech Republic) J Minář	6	6
(France) T Ascione	7	7
2	(Germany) D Brands	5	5

Quarterfinals
(Germany) D Kindlmann	6	7
4	(South Africa) K Anderson	2	5
(Czech Republic) J Minář	3	5
(France) T Ascione	6	7

Semifinals
(Germany) D Kindlmann	6^{3}	6^{4}
(France) T Ascione	7^{7}	7^{7}
