= 2009 Open de Rennes – Doubles =

Doubles
- 2009 Open de Rennes

Final
- Champions: (United States) Eric Butorac (Croatia) Lovro Zovko
- Runners-up: (South Africa) Kevin Anderson (Slovakia) Dominik Hrbatý
- Score: 6–4, 3–6, [10–6]

Events
Singles	Doubles
← 2008 ·	Open de Rennes	· 2010 →

James Auckland and Dick Norman were the defending champions, but chose not to defend their title.
Eric Butorac and Lovro Zovko won the event, beating Kevin Anderson and Dominik Hrbatý 6–4, 3–6, [10–6] in the final.

== Seeds ==
1. (United States) Scott Lipsky / (Netherlands) Rogier Wassen (first round)
2. (United Kingdom) Colin Fleming / (United Kingdom) Ken Skupski (semifinals)
3. (United States) Eric Butorac / (Croatia) Lovro Zovko (champions)
4. (Germany) Philipp Marx / (Slovakia) Igor Zelenay (semifinals)

== Draw ==
=== Key ===
- Q = Qualifier
- WC = Wild card
- LL = Lucky loser
- Alt = Alternate
- SE = Special exempt
- PR = Protected ranking
- ITF = ITF entry
- JE = Junior exempt
- w/o = Walkover
- r = Retired
- d = Defaulted
- SR = Special ranking

=== Draw ===
First round
1	(United States) S Lipsky (Netherlands) R Wassen	6^{5}	3
(South Africa) K Anderson (Slovakia) D Hrbatý	7^{7}	6
ALT	(Morocco) R Chaki (Czech Republic) L Rosol	5	6	[10]
WC	(France) J-B Dupuy (France) V Lavergne	7	2	[2]
4	(Germany) P Marx (Slovakia) I Zelenay	4	7^{7}	[10]
ALT	(France) O Charroin (France) S Robert	6	6^{1}	[4]
WC	(France) F Martin (France) L Walter	7^{7}	2	[6]
WC	(France) C-A Brézac (France) V Stouff	6^{4}	6	[10]
(Australia) C Ball (United States) K Van't Hof	3	5
(France) A Clément (France) A Sidorenko	6	7
(Thailand) Sa Ratiwatana (Brazil) M Torres	6^{2}	4
3	(United States) E Butorac (Croatia) L Zovko	7^{7}	6
(United States) J Cerretani (Australia) R Junaid	6	6
(Switzerland) S Bohli (France) N Mahut	1	4
(Canada) P-L Duclos (Italy) A Motti	0	7^{7}	[4]
2	(United Kingdom) C Fleming (United Kingdom) K Skupski	6	6^{1}	[10]

Quarterfinals
(South Africa) K Anderson (Slovakia) D Hrbatý	6	7^{7}
ALT	(Morocco) R Chaki (Czech Republic) L Rosol	4	6^{3}
4	(Germany) P Marx (Slovakia) I Zelenay	6	6
WC	(France) C-A Brézac (France) V Stouff	4	1
(France) A Clément (France) A Sidorenko	w/o
3	(United States) E Butorac (Croatia) L Zovko
(United States) J Cerretani (Australia) R Junaid	4	3
2	(United Kingdom) C Fleming (United Kingdom) K Skupski	6	6

Semifinals
(South Africa) K Anderson (Slovakia) D Hrbatý	7	6
4	(Germany) P Marx (Slovakia) I Zelenay	5	3
3	(United States) E Butorac (Croatia) L Zovko	3	6	[11]
2	(United Kingdom) C Fleming (United Kingdom) K Skupski	6	1	[9]

Finals
(South Africa) K Anderson (Slovakia) D Hrbatý	4	6	[6]
3	(United States) E Butorac (Croatia) L Zovko	6	3	[10]
