= 2015 Open de Rennes – Doubles =

Doubles
- 2015 Open de Rennes

Final
- Champions: (Italy) Andrea Arnaboldi (Croatia) Antonio Šančić
- Runners-up: (Netherlands) Wesley Koolhof (Netherlands) Matwé Middelkoop
- Score: 6–4, 2–6, [14–12]

Events
| Singles | Doubles |
| ← 2014 · | Open de Rennes | · 2017 → |

Tobias Kamke and Philipp Marx were the defending champions, but chose not to defend their title. Unseeded pair Andrea Arnaboldi and Antonio Šančić won the title defeating Wesley Koolhof and Matwé Middelkoop in the final 6–4, 2–6, [14–12].

== Seeds ==
1. (Austria) Oliver Marach / (United States) Nicholas Monroe (quarterfinals)
2. (Czech Republic) František Čermák / (Croatia) Mate Pavić (first round)
3. (New Zealand) Marcus Daniell / (Brazil) Marcelo Demoliner (semifinals)
4. (Netherlands) Wesley Koolhof / (Netherlands) Matwé Middelkoop (final)

== Draw ==
=== Key ===
- Q = Qualifier
- WC = Wild card
- LL = Lucky loser
- Alt = Alternate
- SE = Special exempt
- PR = Protected ranking
- ITF = ITF entry
- JE = Junior exempt
- w/o = Walkover
- r = Retired
- d = Defaulted
- SR = Special ranking

First round
1 | (Austria) O Marach (United States) N Monroe | 6 | 6
(Czech Republic) J Mertl (Ukraine) A Smirnov | 2 | 3
(France) F Martin (United Kingdom) N Skupski | 6 | 6
(Portugal) Romain Barbosa (Belgium) S Darcis | 1 | 2
4 | (Netherlands) W Koolhof (Netherlands) M Middelkoop | w/o
WC | (France) E Couacaud (France) C Hemery
(France) A Sidorenko (France) M Teixeira | 6 | 6
WC | (France) D Guez (France) R Jouan | 2 | 2
(France) J Eysseric (Netherlands) R Haase | 7^{7} | 3 | [8]
(Slovakia) N Gombos (Russia) K Khachanov | 6^{2} | 6 | [10]
WC | (France) Simon Baudry (France) M Guinard | 1 | 1
3 | (New Zealand) M Daniell (Brazil) M Demoliner | 6 | 6
(Italy) A Arnaboldi (Croatia) A Šančić | 7 | 6
(Croatia) D Marcan (Austria) T-S Weissborn | 5 | 2
(Netherlands) I Sijsling (Sweden) A Siljeström | 6 | 6
2 | (Czech Republic) F Čermák (Croatia) M Pavić | 4 | 4

Quarterfinals
1 | (Austria) O Marach (United States) N Monroe | 6^{3} | 4
(France) F Martin (United Kingdom) N Skupski | 7^{7} | 6
4 | (Netherlands) W Koolhof (Netherlands) M Middelkoop | 6 | 7
(France) A Sidorenko (France) M Teixeira | 3 | 5
(Slovakia) N Gombos (Russia) K Khachanov | 3 | 4
3 | (New Zealand) M Daniell (Brazil) M Demoliner | 6 | 6
(Italy) A Arnaboldi (Croatia) A Šančić | 6^{3} | 6 | [10]
(Netherlands) I Sijsling (Sweden) A Siljeström | 7^{7} | 4 | [7]

Semifinals
(France) F Martin (United Kingdom) N Skupski | 4 | 6 | [6]
4 | (Netherlands) W Koolhof (Netherlands) M Middelkoop | 6 | 3 | [10]
(New Zealand) M Daniell (Brazil) M Demoliner | 6 | 3 | [7]
(Italy) A Arnaboldi (Croatia) A Šančić | 3 | 6 | [10]

Final
4 | (Netherlands) W Koolhof (Netherlands) M Middelkoop | 4 | 6 | [12]
(Italy) A Arnaboldi (Croatia) A Šančić | 6 | 2 | [14]
