= 2020 Open de Rennes – Singles =

Singles
- 2020 Open de Rennes

Final
- Champion: (France) Arthur Rinderknech
- Runner-up: (United Kingdom) James Ward
- Score: 7–5, 6–4

Events
Singles	Doubles
← 2019 ·	Open de Rennes	· 2021 →

Ričardas Berankis was the defending champion but chose not to defend his title.

Arthur Rinderknech won the title after defeating James Ward 7–5, 6–4 in the final.

== Seeds ==
All seeds receive a bye into the second round.

1. (Ukraine) Sergiy Stakhovsky (third round)
2. (Germany) Oscar Otte (second round)
3. (Serbia) Danilo Petrović (semifinals)
4. (Slovakia) Lukáš Lacko (second round)
5. (France) Maxime Janvier (second round)
6. (Russia) Alexey Vatutin (third round)
7. (Spain) Bernabé Zapata Miralles (second round)
8. (France) Tristan Lamasine (third round)
9. (Germany) Mats Moraing (third round)
10. (France) Constant Lestienne (quarterfinals)
11. (France) Alexandre Müller (second round, retired)
12. (Spain) Roberto Ortega Olmedo (quarterfinals)
13. (Germany) Tobias Kamke (semifinals)
14. (Russia) Pavel Kotov (second round)
15. (Turkey) Cem İlkel (quarterfinals)
16. (Austria) Lucas Miedler (second round)

== Draw ==
=== Key ===
- Q = Qualifier
- WC = Wild card
- LL = Lucky loser
- Alt = Alternate
- SE = Special exempt
- PR = Protected ranking
- ITF = ITF entry
- JE = Junior exempt
- w/o = Walkover
- r = Retired
- d = Defaulted
- SR = Special ranking

=== Finals ===
Quarterfinals
13	(Germany) Tobias Kamke	6	6
12	(Spain) Roberto Ortega Olmedo	3	3
15	(Turkey) Cem İlkel	6	1	4
(France) Arthur Rinderknech	3	6	6
10	(France) Constant Lestienne	2	6^{6}
3	(Serbia) Danilo Petrović	6	7^{8}
WC	(France) Kyrian Jacquet	5	6	3
(United Kingdom) James Ward	7	3	6

Semifinals
13	(Germany) Tobias Kamke	4	6	3
(France) Arthur Rinderknech	6	2	6
3	(Serbia) Danilo Petrović	6^{7}	6^{4}
(United Kingdom) James Ward	7^{9}	7^{7}

Final
(France) Arthur Rinderknech	7	6
(United Kingdom) James Ward	5	4

=== Top half ===
==== Section 1 ====
First round
(France) M Hamou	5	6^{3}
(Croatia) N Serdarušić	7	7^{7}
Alt	(Finland) P Niklas-Salminen	6	6
(Italy) L Vanni	3	4
(Czech Republic) V Šafránek	4	2
WC	(France) D Added	6	6
(Belarus) U Ignatik	3	7^{7}	4
WC	(France) E Furness	6	6^{2}	6

Second round
1	(Ukraine) S Stakhovsky	7^{7}	6
(Croatia) N Serdarušić	6^{3}	4
Alt	(Finland) P Niklas-Salminen	4	1
13	(Germany) T Kamke	6	6
12	(Spain) R Ortega Olmedo	7^{7}	6
WC	(France) D Added	6^{0}	3
WC	(France) E Furness	7^{8}	6
5	(France) M Janvier	6^{6}	2

Third round
1	(Ukraine) S Stakhovsky	2	1
13	(Germany) T Kamke	6	6
12	(Spain) R Ortega Olmedo	4	6	7
WC	(France) E Furness	6	2	5

Quarterfinals
13	(Germany) T Kamke	6	6
12	(Spain) R Ortega Olmedo	3	3

==== Section 2 ====
First round
Alt	(France) A Escoffier	6	6
(France) M Guinard	4	3
Alt	(Italy) A Bega	2	7^{7}	7
(Italy) A Pellegrino	6	6^{5}	5
(Egypt) K-M Maamoun	7^{7}	6
(Austria) J Rodionov	6^{5}	3
(Italy) A Arnaboldi	4	3
(France) A Rinderknech	6	6

Second round
4	(Slovakia) L Lacko	5	2
Alt	(France) A Escoffier	7	6
Alt	(Italy) A Bega	4	2
15	(Turkey) C İlkel	6	6
9	(Germany) M Moraing	6	6
(Egypt) K-M Maamoun	4	3
(France) A Rinderknech	6	3	7^{7}
7	(Spain) B Zapata Miralles	3	6	6^{3}

Third round
Alt	(France) A Escoffier	3	6	3
15	(Turkey) C İlkel	6	2	6
9	(Germany) M Moraing	2	3
(France) A Rinderknech	6	6

Quarterfinals
15	(Turkey) C İlkel	6	1	4
(France) A Rinderknech	3	6	6

=== Bottom half ===
==== Section 3 ====
First round
(Germany) M Zverev	6	6
(France) Baptiste Crepatte	0	1
(Czech Republic) T Macháč	6^{3}	7^{7}	4
WC	(Poland) J Janowicz	7^{7}	6^{4}	6
Q	(Russia) T Gabashvili	6	6
(Sweden) M Eriksson	1	3
WC	(France) V Royer	7^{10}	6
(France) R Roumane	6^{8}	3

Second round
6	(Russia) A Vatutin	6	6
(Germany) M Zverev	4	4
WC	(Poland) J Janowicz	6^{3}	4
10	(France) C Lestienne	7^{7}	6
16	(Austria) L Miedler	6^{6}	0
Q	(Russia) T Gabashvili	7^{8}	6
WC	(France) V Royer	1	6	3
3	(Serbia) D Petrović	6	3	6

Third round
6	(Russia) A Vatutin	5	3
10	(France) C Lestienne	7	6
Q	(Russia) T Gabashvili	5	2
3	(Serbia) D Petrović	7	6

Quarterfinals
10	(France) C Lestienne	2	6^{6}
3	(Serbia) D Petrović	6	7^{8}

==== Section 4 ====
First round
(Czech Republic) V Kopřiva	3	6	6
(Norway) V Durasovic	6	3	4
WC	(France) K Jacquet	3	7	6
(Turkey) A Çelikbilek	6	5	0
(France) B Bonzi	6	6^{6}	5
(United Kingdom) J Ward	3	7^{8}	7
Q	(France) C Denolly	6	3	6
(Slovakia) L Klein	2	6	3

Second round
8	(France) T Lamasine	6	3	6
(Czech Republic) V Kopřiva	3	6	0
WC	(France) K Jacquet	6	0
11	(France) A Müller	2	2^{r}
14	(Russia) P Kotov	3	7^{7}	3
(United Kingdom) J Ward	6	6^{5}	6
Q	(France) C Denolly	6	6
2	(Germany) O Otte	4	2

Third round
8	(France) T Lamasine	6	1	2
WC	(France) K Jacquet	2	6	6
(United Kingdom) J Ward	6	6
Q	(France) C Denolly	4	3

Quarterfinals
WC	(France) K Jacquet	5	6	3
(United Kingdom) J Ward	7	3	6
