= 2025 Open de Rennes =

- Date: 8–14 September
- Edition: 19th
- Surface: Hard (Indoor)
- Location: Rennes, France

Champions

Singles
- (France) Hugo Gaston

Doubles
- (Finland) Patrik Niklas-Salminen / (Czech Republic) Matěj Vocel
← 2024 ·	Open de Rennes	· 2026 →

The 2025 Open Blot Rennes was a professional tennis tournament played on hard courts. It was the 19th edition of the tournament and part of the 2025 ATP Challenger Tour. It took place in Rennes, France between 8 and 14 September 2025.

== Singles main-draw entrants ==
=== Seeds ===
Country	Player	Rank^{1}	Seed
FRA	Hugo Gaston	125	1
SUI	Stan Wawrinka	146	2
FRA	Harold Mayot	152	3
FRA	Titouan Droguet	159	4
~~FRA~~	~~Calvin Hemery~~	~~185~~	~~5~~
FRA	Sascha Gueymard Wayenburg	206	6
ITA	Federico Cinà	210	7
FRA	Arthur Bouquier	215	8

- ^{1} Rankings are as of 25 August 2025.

=== Other entrants ===
The following players received wildcards into the singles main draw:

- (France) Sean Cuenin
- (France) Daniel Jade
- (France) Maé Malige

The following players received entry into the singles main draw as alternates:

- (France) Grégoire Barrère
- (Ukraine) Vadym Ursu

The following players received entry from the qualifying draw:

- (France) Enzo Couacaud
- (France) Kenny de Schepper
- (France) Maxime Janvier
- (United States) Cannon Kingsley
- (France) Leo Raquillet
- Nikolay Vylegzhanin

The following players received entry as lucky losers:

- (France) Robin Catry
- Egor Gerasimov

== Champions ==
=== Singles ===
- (France) Hugo Gaston def. (Switzerland) Stan Wawrinka 6–4, 6–4.

=== Doubles ===
- (Finland) Patrik Niklas-Salminen / (Czech Republic) Matěj Vocel def. (Germany) Hendrik Jebens / (France) Albano Olivetti 6–3, 6–3.
