= 2011 Open de Rennes – Doubles =

Doubles
- 2011 Open de Rennes

Final
- Champions: (Germany) Martin Emmrich (Sweden) Andreas Siljeström
- Runners-up: (France) Kenny de Schepper (France) Édouard Roger-Vasselin
- Score: 6–4, 6–4

Events
Singles	Doubles
← 2010 ·	Open de Rennes	· 2012 →

Scott Lipsky and David Martin were the defending champions but decided not to participate.
Martin Emmrich and Andreas Siljeström won the title, defeating Kenny de Schepper and Édouard Roger-Vasselin in the final.

== Seeds ==
1. (Austria) Julian Knowle / (Brazil) André Sá (semifinals)
2. (Canada) Adil Shamasdin / (Croatia) Lovro Zovko (quarterfinals)
3. (France) Arnaud Clément / (France) Nicolas Mahut (quarterfinals)
4. (United States) James Cerretani / (Australia) Colin Ebelthite (first round)

== Draw ==
=== Key ===
- Q = Qualifier
- WC = Wild card
- LL = Lucky loser
- Alt = Alternate
- SE = Special exempt
- PR = Protected ranking
- ITF = ITF entry
- JE = Junior exempt
- w/o = Walkover
- r = Retired
- d = Defaulted
- SR = Special ranking

=== Draw ===
First round
1	(Austria) J Knowle (Brazil) A Sá	6	7^{7}
(United Kingdom) J Delgado (Australia) A Feeney	4	6^{3}
(Belgium) R Bemelmans (Germany) D Brown	6	3	[10]
(Lithuania) R Berankis (Ukraine) S Bubka	3	6	[7]
4	(United States) J Cerretani (Australia) C Ebelthite	7^{7}	4	[8]
(Germany) A Beck (United Kingdom) K Skupski	6^{5}	6	[10]
(France) K de Schepper (France) É Roger-Vasselin	w/o
(France) D Guez (France) A Mannarino
(Poland) T Bednarek (France) O Charroin	6	6
(Spain) A Brugués-Davi (Tunisia) M Jaziri	3	0
WC	(France) G Burquier (France) Tristan Lamasine	6^{2}	5
3	(France) A Clément (France) N Mahut	7^{7}	7
WC	(France) R Jouan (France) V Millot	4	4
(Germany) M Emmrich (Sweden) A Siljeström	6	6
WC	(France) Jean-Baptiste Dupuy (France) Vincent Lavergne	4	3
2	(Canada) A Shamasdin (Croatia) L Zovko	6	6

Quarterfinals
1	(Austria) J Knowle (Brazil) A Sá	6	4	[10]
(Belgium) R Bemelmans (Germany) D Brown	3	6	[3]
(Germany) A Beck (United Kingdom) K Skupski	3	4
(France) K de Schepper (France) É Roger-Vasselin	6	6
(Poland) T Bednarek (France) O Charroin	6^{6}	7^{7}	[10]
3	(France) A Clément (France) N Mahut	7^{8}	6^{5}	[6]
(Germany) M Emmrich (Sweden) A Siljeström	6	6
2	(Canada) A Shamasdin (Croatia) L Zovko	4	4

Semifinals
1	(Austria) J Knowle (Brazil) A Sá	6^{5}	6	[12]
(France) K de Schepper (France) É Roger-Vasselin	7^{7}	2	[14]
(Poland) T Bednarek (France) O Charroin	4	3
(Germany) M Emmrich (Sweden) A Siljeström	6	6

Final
(France) K de Schepper (France) É Roger-Vasselin	4	4
(Germany) M Emmrich (Sweden) A Siljeström	6	6
