= 2015 Open de Rennes – Singles =

Singles
- 2015 Open de Rennes

Final
- Champion: (Tunisia) Malek Jaziri
- Runner-up: (Netherlands) Igor Sijsling
- Score: 5–7, 7–5, 6–4

Events
Singles	Doubles
← 2014 ·	Open de Rennes	· 2017 →

Steve Darcis was the defending champion, but lost in the second round. Malek Jaziri won the title defeating Igor Sijsling in the final 5–7, 7–5, 6–4

== Seeds ==
1. (Netherlands) Robin Haase (first round)
2. (Colombia) Santiago Giraldo (first round)
3. (Belgium) Steve Darcis (second round)
4. (Tunisia) Malek Jaziri (champion)
5. (Serbia) Filip Krajinović (second round)
6. (Turkey) Marsel İlhan (quarterfinals)
7. (Croatia) Ivan Dodig (semifinals)
8. (Ukraine) Illya Marchenko (semifinals)

== Draw ==
=== Key ===
- Q = Qualifier
- WC = Wild card
- LL = Lucky loser
- Alt = Alternate
- SE = Special exempt
- PR = Protected ranking
- ITF = ITF entry
- JE = Junior exempt
- w/o = Walkover
- r = Retired
- d = Defaulted
- SR = Special ranking

=== Finals ===
Semifinals
8	(Ukraine) Illya Marchenko	6^{6}	6	4
(Netherlands) Igor Sijsling	7^{8}	3	6
4	(Tunisia) Malek Jaziri	6^{5}	6	7^{7}
7	(Croatia) Ivan Dodig	7^{7}	3	6^{3}

Final
(Netherlands) Igor Sijsling	7	5	4
4	(Tunisia) Malek Jaziri	5	7	6

=== Top half ===
First round
1	(Netherlands) R Haase	2	2
WC	(France) M Teixeira	6	6
(Russia) K Khachanov	4	7^{7}	7^{7}
(France) C Hemery	6	6^{5}	6^{4}
(Slovakia) N Gomboš	6	6
(Italy) A Arnaboldi	4	2
(Belgium) M Authom	1	3
8	(Ukraine) I Marchenko	6	6
3	(Belgium) S Darcis	7	6
Q	(Germany) Jeremy Jahn	5	4
(Netherlands) I Sijsling	6	7^{7}
Q	(France) R Jouan	2	6^{4}
(Czech Republic) J Mertl	6	6
Q	(Portugal) Romain Barbosa	4	3
WC	(France) M Janvier	4	5
5	(Serbia) F Krajinović	6	7

Second round
WC	(France) M Teixeira	3	4
(Russia) K Khachanov	6	6
(Slovakia) N Gomboš	1	6	5
8	(Ukraine) I Marchenko	6	2	7
3	(Belgium) S Darcis	4	2
(Netherlands) I Sijsling	6	6
(Czech Republic) J Mertl	6	6
5	(Serbia) F Krajinović	3	4

Quarterfinals
(Russia) K Khachanov	4	3
8	(Ukraine) I Marchenko	6	6
(Netherlands) I Sijsling	6^{8}	6	7^{7}
(Czech Republic) J Mertl	7^{10}	3	6^{3}

Semifinals
8	(Ukraine) I Marchenko	6^{6}	6	4
(Netherlands) I Sijsling	7^{8}	3	6

=== Bottom half ===
First round
6	(Turkey) M İlhan	2	7	6
WC	(France) E Couacaud	6	5	2
Alt	(France) J Eysseric	6	6
(Australia) J-P Smith	2	4
(France) D Guez	4	4
(Sweden) E Ymer	6	6
Q	(United Kingdom) James Marsalek	1	2
4	(Tunisia) M Jaziri	6	6
7	(Croatia) I Dodig	6	6
Alt	(Ukraine) A Smirnov	2	3
LL	(France) Sebastien Boltz	5	2
(Romania) M Copil	7	6
WC	(France) A Sidorenko	7^{7}	7^{7}
(Italy) L Vanni	6^{4}	6^{2}
(France) V Millot	7^{8}	6
2	(Colombia) S Giraldo	6^{6}	2

Second round
6	(Turkey) M İlhan	6	6
Alt	(France) J Eysseric	2	4
(Sweden) E Ymer	1^{r}
4	(Tunisia) M Jaziri	4
7	(Croatia) I Dodig	7	7^{7}
(Romania) M Copil	5	6^{3}
WC	(France) A Sidorenko	4	7^{8}	1
(France) V Millot	6	6^{6}	6

Quarterfinals
6	(Turkey) M İlhan	2	6	2
4	(Tunisia) M Jaziri	6	1	6
7	(Croatia) I Dodig	6	4	6
(France) V Millot	4	6	3

Semifinals
4	(Tunisia) M Jaziri	6^{5}	6	7^{7}
7	(Croatia) I Dodig	7^{7}	3	6^{3}
