= 2025 Open de Rennes – Doubles =

Doubles
- 2025 Open de Rennes

Final
- Champions: (Finland) Patrik Niklas-Salminen (Czech Republic) Matěj Vocel
- Runners-up: (Germany) Hendrik Jebens (France) Albano Olivetti
- Score: 6–3, 6–3

Events
Singles	Doubles
- Open de Rennes

Sander Arends and Grégoire Jacq were the defending champions but chose not to defend their title.

Patrik Niklas-Salminen and Matěj Vocel won the title after defeating Hendrik Jebens and Albano Olivetti 6–3, 6–3 in the final.

== Seeds ==
1. (Germany) Hendrik Jebens / (France) Albano Olivetti (final)
2. (India) Jeevan Nedunchezhiyan / (Germany) Christoph Negritu (first round)
3. (United States) Trey Hilderbrand / (United States) Mac Kiger (first round)
4. (Spain) Sergio Martos Gornés / (Germany) Tim Rühl (first round)

== Draw ==
Key

- Q = Qualifier
- WC = Wild card
- LL = Lucky loser
- Alt = Alternate
- ITF = ITF entry
- PR = Protected ranking
- SR = Special ranking
- SE = Special exempt
- JE = Junior exempt
- JR = Junior Accelerator Programme entrant
- CO = College Accelerator Programme entrant
- NG = Next Gen Accelerator Program entrant
- w/o = Walkover
- r = Retired
- d = Defaulted

=== Draw ===
First round
1	(Germany) H Jebens (France) A Olivetti	5	6	[11]
(France) A Reymond (France) L Sanchez	7	3	[9]
(France) D Added (France) A Bouquier	2	6	[7]
(France) C Chidekh (Antigua and Barbuda) J Maginley	6	3	[10]
3	(United States) T Hilderbrand (United States) M Kiger	4	3
(France) M Martineau (United Kingdom) J Paris	6	6
(Netherlands) M Hermans (Germany) P Zahraj	6	1	[10]
Alt	(Italy) F Moroni (Ukraine) Vadym Ursu	2	6	[7]
(Bulgaria) A Genov (Zimbabwe) CJ Lock	5	2
(Finland) P Niklas-Salminen (Czech Republic) M Vocel	7	6
WC	(France) E Couacaud (France) E Furness	7^{7}	5	[10]
4	(Spain) S Martos Gornés (Germany) T Rühl	6^{4}	7	[7]
E Gerasimov (Kazakhstan) M Kukushkin	7^{7}	6
WC	(France) Robin Catry (France) K de Schepper	6^{2}	4
(Belgium) M Geerts (Netherlands) T Loof	1	7^{7}	[10]
2	(India) J Nedunchezhiyan (Germany) C Negritu	6	6^{5}	[4]

Quarterfinals
1	(Germany) H Jebens (France) A Olivetti	7	6
(France) C Chidekh (Antigua and Barbuda) J Maginley	5	4
(France) M Martineau (United Kingdom) J Paris	7^{7}	6
(Netherlands) M Hermans (Germany) P Zahraj	6^{5}	3
(Finland) P Niklas-Salminen (Czech Republic) M Vocel	w/o
WC	(France) E Couacaud (France) E Furness
E Gerasimov (Kazakhstan) M Kukushkin	2	0
(Belgium) M Geerts (Netherlands) T Loof	6	6

Semifinals
1	(Germany) H Jebens (France) A Olivetti	6	4	[10]
(France) M Martineau (United Kingdom) J Paris	4	6	[4]
(Finland) P Niklas-Salminen (Czech Republic) M Vocel	6	6
(Belgium) M Geerts (Netherlands) T Loof	4	3

Final
1	(Germany) H Jebens (France) A Olivetti	3	3
(Finland) P Niklas-Salminen (Czech Republic) M Vocel	6	6
