= 2026 Open de Rennes – Singles =

Singles
- 2026 Open de Rennes

Final
- Champion: (France) Sascha Gueymard Wayenburg
- Runner-up: (France) Harold Mayot
- Score: 4–6, 6–3, 7–5

Events
Singles	Doubles
- Open de Rennes

Hugo Gaston was the defending champion but chose not to defend his title.

Sascha Gueymard Wayenburg won the title after defeating Harold Mayot 4–6, 6–3, 7–5 in the final.

== Seeds ==
1. (France) Adrian Mannarino (second round)
2. (France) Titouan Droguet (semifinals)
3. (France) Clément Tabur (first round)
4. (United Kingdom) Billy Harris (first round)
5. (Croatia) Borna Gojo (quarterfinals)
6. (Italy) Francesco Maestrelli (quarterfinals)
7. (Australia) Tristan Schoolkate (semifinals)
8. (France) Clément Chidekh (quarterfinals)

== Draw ==
Key

- Q = Qualifier
- WC = Wild card
- LL = Lucky loser
- Alt = Alternate
- ITF = ITF entry
- PR = Protected ranking
- SR = Special ranking
- SE = Special exempt
- JE = Junior exempt
- JR = Junior Accelerator Programme entrant
- CO = College Accelerator Programme entrant
- NG = Next Gen Accelerator Program entrant
- w/o = Walkover
- r = Retired
- d = Defaulted

=== Finals ===
Semifinals
7	(Australia) Tristan Schoolkate	3	3
(France) Harold Mayot	6	6
(France) Sascha Gueymard Wayenburg	4	7^{10}	6
2	(France) Titouan Droguet	6	6^{8}	3

Final
(France) Harold Mayot	6	3	5
(France) Sascha Gueymard Wayenburg	4	6	7

=== Top half ===
First round
1	(France) A Mannarino	6	6
(France) D Added	2	4
Q	(France) M Bobichon	6	6
(Ivory Coast) E Coulibaly	4	4
WC	(France) Mickael Kaouk	0	3
(United Kingdom) A Matusevich	6	6
Alt	(Czech Republic) M Gengel	1	3
7	(Australia) T Schoolkate	6	6
3	(France) C Tabur	6^{5}	6	4
(France) H Mayot	7^{7}	1	6
(United States) M Cassone	6	7^{10}
(Spain) I Montes de la Torre	3	6^{8}
(Spain) D Jordà Sanchis	5	4
(France) L Poullain	7	6
Q	(United Kingdom) F Bass	5	4
8	(France) C Chidekh	7	6

Second round
1	(France) A Mannarino	3	5
Q	(France) M Bobichon	6	7
(United Kingdom) A Matusevich	7^{9}	4	4
7	(Australia) T Schoolkate	6^{7}	6	6
(France) H Mayot	w/o
(United States) M Cassone
(France) L Poullain	3	4
8	(France) C Chidekh	6	6

Quarterfinals
Q	(France) M Bobichon	2	1
7	(Australia) T Schoolkate	6	6
(France) H Mayot	6	6
8	(France) C Chidekh	4	4

Semifinals
7	(Australia) T Schoolkate	3	3
(France) H Mayot	6	6

=== Bottom half ===
First round
6	(Italy) F Maestrelli	6	7^{7}
WC	(France) Arthur Nagel	4	6^{3}
WC	(France) Leo Raquillet	1	4
Q	(France) Yanis Ghazouani Durand	6	6
Q	(France) M Janvier	4	3
(France) S Gueymard Wayenburg	6	6
(France) U Blanchet	7	7^{7}
4	(United Kingdom) B Harris	5	6^{4}
5	(Croatia) B Gojo	6	7^{8}
Q	(Germany) D Masur	4	6^{6}
Q	(Germany) M Schönhaus	6^{2}	4
(France) M Martineau	7^{7}	6
(United Kingdom) H Stewart	7	2^{r}
(Spain) D Rincón	5	4
(Italy) M Ribecai	6^{1}	4
2	(France) T Droguet	7^{7}	6

Second round
6	(Italy) F Maestrelli	4	7^{7}	6
Q	(France) Y Ghazouani Durand	6	6^{3}	3
(France) S Gueymard Wayenburg	6	6
(France) U Blanchet	4	4
5	(Croatia) B Gojo	6	6
(France) M Martineau	4	4
(Spain) D Rincón	7	4	3
2	(France) T Droguet	5	6	6

Quarterfinals
6	(Italy) F Maestrelli	0	3
(France) S Gueymard Wayenburg	6	6
5	(Croatia) B Gojo	2	6	3
2	(France) T Droguet	6	3	6

Semifinals
(France) S Gueymard Wayenburg	4	7^{10}	6
2	(France) T Droguet	6	6^{8}	3
