= 2017 Open de Rennes – Doubles =

Doubles
- 2017 Open de Rennes

Final
- Champions: (Russia) Evgeny Donskoy (Russia) Mikhail Elgin
- Runners-up: (Austria) Julian Knowle (United Kingdom) Jonathan Marray
- Score: 6–4, 3–6, [11–9]

Events
Singles	Doubles
← 2015 ·	Open de Rennes	· 2018 →

Andrea Arnaboldi and Antonio Šančić were the defending champions but only Šančić chose to defend his title, partnering Marin Draganja. Šančić lost in the first round to Julian Knowle and Jonathan Marray.

Evgeny Donskoy and Mikhail Elgin won the title after defeating Knowle and Marray 6–4, 3–6, [11–9] in the final.

== Seeds ==
1. (United States) James Cerretani / (United States) Max Schnur (quarterfinals)
2. (Croatia) Marin Draganja / (Croatia) Antonio Šančić (first round)
3. (Peru) Sergio Galdós / (Brazil) Fabrício Neis (first round)
4. (Belarus) Aliaksandr Bury / (Belarus) Andrei Vasilevski (quarterfinals)

== Draw ==
Key

- Q = Qualifier
- WC = Wild card
- LL = Lucky loser
- Alt = Alternate
- ITF = ITF entry
- PR = Protected ranking
- SR = Special ranking
- SE = Special exempt
- JE = Junior exempt
- JR = Junior Accelerator Programme entrant
- CO = College Accelerator Programme entrant
- NG = Next Gen Accelerator Program entrant
- w/o = Walkover
- r = Retired
- d = Defaulted

First round
1	(United States) J Cerretani (United States) M Schnur	7	6
(Germany) G Kretschmer (Austria) T-S Weissborn	5	4
WC	(France) T Lamasine (France) A Olivetti	5	5
(Russia) E Donskoy (Russia) M Elgin	7	7
4	(Belarus) A Bury (Belarus) A Vasilevski	7^{8}	7^{7}
(Uruguay) A Behar (Chinese Taipei) H-y Peng	6^{6}	6^{2}
(Germany) A Begemann (Germany) T Kamke	6	6
WC	(France) E Furness (France) R Jouan	3	3
(Thailand) Sa Ratiwatana (Thailand) So Ratiwatana	6	7
(Argentina) G Andreozzi (El Salvador) M Arévalo	4	5
(Czech Republic) R Jebavý (Ukraine) S Stakhovsky	6	6
3	(Peru) S Galdós (Brazil) F Neis	4	3
(Slovakia) J Kovalík (Czech Republic) L Rosol	5	6	[10]
WC	(France) G Jacq (France) H Nys	7	3	[5]
(Austria) J Knowle (United Kingdom) J Marray	6	7^{7}
2	(Croatia) M Draganja (Croatia) A Šančić	3	6^{0}

Quarterfinals
1	(United States) J Cerretani (United States) M Schnur	3	6	[7]
(Russia) E Donskoy (Russia) M Elgin	6	3	[10]
4	(Belarus) A Bury (Belarus) A Vasilevski	4	6	[6]
(Germany) A Begemann (Germany) T Kamke	6	4	[10]
(Thailand) Sa Ratiwatana (Thailand) So Ratiwatana	6	5	[10]
(Czech Republic) R Jebavý (Ukraine) S Stakhovsky	3	7	[2]
(Slovakia) J Kovalík (Czech Republic) L Rosol	3	4
(Austria) J Knowle (United Kingdom) J Marray	6	6

Semifinals
(Russia) E Donskoy (Russia) M Elgin	6	6
(Germany) A Begemann (Germany) T Kamke	3	4
(Thailand) Sa Ratiwatana (Thailand) So Ratiwatana	3	7^{7}	[7]
(Austria) J Knowle (United Kingdom) J Marray	6	6^{5}	[10]

Final
(Russia) E Donskoy (Russia) M Elgin	6	3	[11]
(Austria) J Knowle (United Kingdom) J Marray	4	6	[9]
