= 2012 Open de Rennes – Singles =

Singles
- 2012 Open de Rennes

Final
- Champion: (France) Kenny de Schepper
- Runner-up: (Ukraine) Illya Marchenko
- Score: 7–6^{(7–4)}, 6–2

Events
Singles	Doubles
← 2011 ·	Open de Rennes	· 2013 →

Julien Benneteau was the defending champion but decided not to participate.
Kenny de Schepper won the title, defeating Illya Marchenko 7–6^{(7–4)}, 6–2 in the final.

== Seeds ==
1. (Slovenia) Aljaž Bedene (first round)
2. (Austria) Andreas Haider-Maurer (first round)
3. (Belgium) Ruben Bemelmans (first round)
4. (Belgium) Olivier Rochus (semifinals)
5. (France) Michaël Llodra (second round)
6. (Germany) Matthias Bachinger (second round)
7. (France) Florent Serra (second round)
8. (France) Josselin Ouanna (withdrew because of a right ischiotibial injury)
9. (Argentina) Federico Delbonis (first round)

== Draw ==
=== Key ===
- Q = Qualifier
- WC = Wild card
- LL = Lucky loser
- Alt = Alternate
- SE = Special exempt
- PR = Protected ranking
- ITF = ITF entry
- JE = Junior exempt
- w/o = Walkover
- r = Retired
- d = Defaulted
- SR = Special ranking

=== Finals ===
Semifinals
(France) Kenny de Schepper	7^{7}	6
(Belgium) Maxime Authom	6^{3}	3
4	(Belgium) Olivier Rochus	6	3	5
Q	(Ukraine) Illya Marchenko	1	6	7

Final
(France) Kenny de Schepper	7^{7}	6
Q	(Ukraine) Illya Marchenko	6^{4}	2

=== Top half ===
First round
1	(Slovenia) A Bedene	7^{7}	3	4
LL	(Austria) M Fischer	6^{5}	6	6
(France) P-H Herbert	6	7^{7}
(France) J Dasnières de Veigy	3	6^{3}
(France) A Olivetti	6^{5}	2
(France) K de Schepper	7^{7}	6
(Germany) P Torebko	3	4
7	(France) F Serra	6	6
3	(Belgium) R Bemelmans	6	6^{3}	3
WC	(France) G Burquier	1	7^{7}	6
Q	(France) F Martin	3	4
Q	(Austria) D Thiem	6	6
(Belgium) M Authom	6	6
Q	(Lithuania) L Grigelis	4	3
(United Kingdom) J Baker	4	5
5	(France) M Llodra	6	7

Second round
LL	(Austria) M Fischer	6	2	7^{7}
(France) P-H Herbert	3	6	6^{2}
(France) K de Schepper	6	6
7	(France) F Serra	3	4
WC	(France) G Burquier	4	4
Q	(Austria) D Thiem	6	6
(Belgium) M Authom	7^{7}	7^{7}
5	(France) M Llodra	6^{4}	6^{4}

Quarterfinals
LL	(Austria) M Fischer	3	4
(France) K de Schepper	6	6
Q	(Austria) D Thiem	5	2
(Belgium) M Authom	7	6

Semifinals
(France) K de Schepper	7^{7}	6
(Belgium) M Authom	6^{3}	3

=== Bottom half ===
First round
6	(Germany) M Bachinger	6	6
WC	(France) Julien Obry	1	2
(Poland) M Przysiężny	6^{4}	6	3
WC	(France) M Gicquel	7^{7}	4	6
WC	(France) M Teixeira	7^{7}	6
(France) V Millot	6^{5}	4
(France) A Mannarino	4	4
4	(Belgium) O Rochus	6	6
9	(Argentina) F Delbonis	1	6^{3}
(Belgium) Y Mertens	6	7^{7}
PR	(Serbia) F Krajinović	7^{7}	4	3
PR	(France) Charles-Antoine Brézac	6^{5}	6	6
(Belgium) N Desein	6	7^{8}
(Austria) P Oswald	2	6^{6}
Q	(Ukraine) I Marchenko	6	6
2	(Austria) A Haider-Maurer	4	4

Second round
6	(Germany) M Bachinger	5	4
WC	(France) M Gicquel	7	6
WC	(France) M Teixeira	2	1
4	(Belgium) O Rochus	6	6
(Belgium) Y Mertens	4	2
PR	(France) C-A Brézac	6	6
(Belgium) N Desein	3	6	2
Q	(Ukraine) I Marchenko	6	1	6

Quarterfinals
WC	(France) M Gicquel	6	1	6^{2}
4	(Belgium) O Rochus	3	6	7^{7}
PR	(France) C-A Brézac	6^{10}	3
Q	(Ukraine) I Marchenko	7^{12}	6

Semifinals
4	(Belgium) O Rochus	6	3	5
Q	(Ukraine) I Marchenko	1	6	7
