= 2014 Open de Rennes – Singles =

Singles
- 2014 Open de Rennes

Final
- Champion: (Belgium) Steve Darcis
- Runner-up: (France) Nicolas Mahut
- Score: 6–2, 6–4

Events
Singles	Doubles
← 2013 ·	Open de Rennes	· 2015 →

Nicolas Mahut, the defending champion, lost 2–6, 4–6 in the final to Steve Darcis.

== Seeds ==
1. (Germany) Jan-Lennard Struff (second round)
2. (Brazil) Thomaz Bellucci (first round)
3. (France) Paul-Henri Mathieu (second round)
4. (Israel) Dudi Sela (second round)
5. (Austria) Andreas Haider-Maurer (quarterfinals)
6. (Germany) Dustin Brown (quarterfinals)
7. (Germany) Andreas Beck (first round)
8. (Germany) Tobias Kamke (second round)

== Draw ==
=== Key ===
- Q = Qualifier
- WC = Wild card
- LL = Lucky loser
- Alt = Alternate
- SE = Special exempt
- PR = Protected ranking
- ITF = ITF entry
- JE = Junior exempt
- w/o = Walkover
- r = Retired
- d = Defaulted
- SR = Special ranking

=== Finals ===
Semifinals
WC	(France) Enzo Couacaud	0^{r}
(France) Nicolas Mahut	3
PR	(Belgium) Steve Darcis	6	6
(Turkey) Marsel İlhan	4	4

Final
(France) Nicolas Mahut	2	4
PR	(Belgium) Steve Darcis	6	6

=== Top half ===
First round
1	(Germany) J-L Struff	6	7^{7}
Q	(Germany) T Pütz	3	6^{5}
Q	(Netherlands) R Haase	6	6
(Spain) P Riba	4	2
WC	(France) T Lamasine	6^{3}	6	2
Q	(Russia) K Khachanov	7^{7}	2	6
WC	(France) E Couacaud	3	6	7^{7}
7	(Germany) A Beck	6	3	6^{4}
3/WC	(France) P-H Mathieu	7	5	6
(Croatia) M Delić	5	7	3
WC	(France) M Gicquel	6	6
(Austria) G Melzer	1	1
(France) N Mahut	6	6
(France) G Burquier	4	4
(France) V Millot	1	4
8	(Germany) T Kamke	6	6

Second round
1	(Germany) J-L Struff	3	4
Q	(Netherlands) R Haase	6	6
Q	(Russia) K Khachanov	6	1	3
WC	(France) E Couacaud	3	6	6
3/WC	(France) P-H Mathieu	6	6^{6}	1
WC	(France) M Gicquel	3	7^{8}	6
(France) N Mahut	7^{7}	6
8	(Germany) T Kamke	6^{4}	3

Quarterfinals
Q	(Netherlands) R Haase	4	7^{7}	6^{4}
WC	(France) E Couacaud	6	6^{5}	7^{7}
WC	(France) M Gicquel	4	2
(France) N Mahut	6	6

Semifinals
WC	(France) E Couacaud	0^{r}
(France) N Mahut	3

=== Bottom half ===
First round
6	(Germany) D Brown	6	2	6
(Romania) V Hănescu	4	6	4
(Slovakia) N Gomboš	5	1
(Italy) M Viola	7	6
PR	(Belgium) S Darcis	6	6
Q	(Austria) M Fischer	4	0
(Germany) A Zverev	3	3
4	(Israel) D Sela	6	6
5	(Austria) A Haider-Maurer	7^{10}	3	6
(Romania) M Copil	6^{8}	6	3
(Germany) M Bachinger	6	6
(Ukraine) I Marchenko	2	2
(France) K de Schepper	7	6
(Czech Republic) J Pospíšil	5	3
(Turkey) M İlhan	6^{4}	7^{7}	6
2	(Brazil) T Bellucci	7^{7}	6^{2}	3

Second round
6	(Germany) D Brown	6	6
(Italy) M Viola	3	3
PR	(Belgium) S Darcis	3	6	6
4	(Israel) D Sela	6	0	2
5	(Austria) A Haider-Maurer	6	7^{9}
(Germany) M Bachinger	3	6^{7}
(France) K de Schepper	6^{4}	6	6^{2}
(Turkey) M İlhan	7^{7}	4	7^{7}

Quarterfinals
6	(Germany) D Brown	6	4	1
PR	(Belgium) S Darcis	1	6	6
5	(Austria) A Haider-Maurer	6	5	3
(Turkey) M İlhan	3	7	6

Semifinals
PR	(Belgium) S Darcis	6	6
(Turkey) M İlhan	4	4
