= 2011 Open de Rennes – Singles =

Singles
- 2011 Open de Rennes

Final
- Champion: (France) Julien Benneteau
- Runner-up: (Belgium) Olivier Rochus
- Score: 6–4, 6–3

Events
Singles	Doubles
← 2010 ·	Open de Rennes	· 2012 →

Marc Gicquel was the defending champion but decided not to participate.

Julien Benneteau won the title, defeating Olivier Rochus in the final.

== Seeds ==
1. (Luxembourg) Gilles Müller (quarterfinals)
2. (France) Adrian Mannarino (second round)
3. (France) Julien Benneteau (champion)
4. (Belgium) Olivier Rochus (final)
5. (France) Nicolas Mahut (quarterfinals)
6. (Belgium) Steve Darcis (second round)
7. (Colombia) Alejandro Falla (first round)
8. (Germany) Cedrik-Marcel Stebe (first round)

== Draw ==
=== Key ===
- Q = Qualifier
- WC = Wild card
- LL = Lucky loser
- Alt = Alternate
- ITF = ITF entry
- PR = Protected ranking
- SR = Special ranking
- SE = Special exempt
- JE = Junior exempt
- JR = Junior Accelerator Programme entrant
- CO = College Accelerator Programme entrant
- NG = Next Gen Accelerator Program entrant
- w/o = Walkover
- r = Retired
- d = Defaulted

=== Finals ===
Semifinals
(France) Édouard Roger-Vasselin	2	2
4	(Belgium) Olivier Rochus	6	6
3	(France) Julien Benneteau	6	6
(Spain) Roberto Bautista-Agut	3	4

Final
4	(Belgium) Olivier Rochus	4	3
3	(France) Julien Benneteau	6	6

=== Top half ===
First round
1/WC	(Luxembourg) G Müller	7	6^{3}	6
(Ukraine) S Bubka	5	7^{7}	4
WC	(France) G Burquier	4	2
(Lithuania) R Berankis	6	6
(France) É Roger-Vasselin	6	6
(Argentina) F Delbonis	2	2
(France) A Gensse	4	3
6	(Belgium) S Darcis	6	6
4	(Belgium) O Rochus	6	2	6
WC	(France) J Dasnières de Veigy	2	6	2
Q	(Serbia) I Bozoljac	6	6
(Estonia) J Zopp	1	3
Q	(Czech Republic) I Minář	7^{12}	5	6^{2}
(Belgium) R Bemelmans	6^{10}	7	7^{7}
(Czech Republic) J Hájek	6	3	6
7	(Colombia) A Falla	3	6	1

Second round
1/WC	(Luxembourg) G Müller	6	6
(Lithuania) R Berankis	4	2
(France) É Roger-Vasselin	3	6	6
6	(Belgium) S Darcis	6	1	3
4	(Belgium) O Rochus	6	6
Q	(Serbia) I Bozoljac	3	4
(Belgium) R Bemelmans	7^{10}	6
(Czech Republic) J Hájek	6^{8}	1

Quarterfinals
1/WC	(Luxembourg) G Müller	5	2
(France) É Roger-Vasselin	7	6
4	(Belgium) O Rochus	6	6
(Belgium) R Bemelmans	2	3

Semifinals
(France) É Roger-Vasselin	2	2
4	(Belgium) O Rochus	6	6

=== Bottom half ===
First round
8	(Germany) C-M Stebe	2	3
Q	(United Kingdom) D Evans	6	6
(Germany) D Brown	5	2
(Tunisia) M Jaziri	7	6
(France) M Teixeira	1	4
(Slovakia) L Lacko	6	6
(Spain) A Brugués-Davi	3	0
3	(France) J Benneteau	6	6
5	(France) N Mahut	7^{7}	6
(France) D Guez	6^{1}	4
WC	(France) A Clément	6	6
Q	(Croatia) N Mektić	4	3
(Spain) R Bautista-Agut	4	6	7^{9}
(Germany) A Beck	6	3	6^{7}
(France) K de Schepper	6^{2}	6	6^{5}
2	(France) A Mannarino	7^{7}	4	7^{7}

Second round
Q	(United Kingdom) D Evans	6	4	3
(Tunisia) M Jaziri	1	6	6
(Slovakia) L Lacko	5	6	6^{5}
3	(France) J Benneteau	7	3	7^{7}
5	(France) N Mahut	6	6
WC	(France) A Clément	3	3
(Spain) R Bautista-Agut	4	7	6
2	(France) A Mannarino	6	5	3

Quarterfinals
(Tunisia) M Jaziri	7	5	0^{r}
3	(France) J Benneteau	5	7	3
5	(France) N Mahut	4	5
(Spain) R Bautista-Agut	6	7

Semifinals
3	(France) J Benneteau	6	6
(Spain) R Bautista-Agut	3	4
