= 2025 Open de Rennes – Singles =

Singles
- 2025 Open de Rennes

Final
- Champion: (France) Hugo Gaston
- Runner-up: (Switzerland) Stan Wawrinka
- Score: 6–4, 6–4

Events
Singles	Doubles
- Open de Rennes

Jacob Fearnley was the defending champion but chose not to defend his title.

Hugo Gaston won the title after defeating Stan Wawrinka 6–4, 6–4 in the final.

== Seeds ==
1. (France) Hugo Gaston (champion)
2. (Switzerland) Stan Wawrinka (final)
3. (France) Harold Mayot (quarterfinals)
4. (France) Titouan Droguet (second round)
5. (France) Calvin Hemery (withdrew)
6. (France) Sascha Gueymard Wayenburg (second round)
7. (Italy) Federico Cinà (second round)
8. (France) Arthur Bouquier (second round)

== Draw ==
Key

- Q = Qualifier
- WC = Wild card
- LL = Lucky loser
- Alt = Alternate
- ITF = ITF entry
- PR = Protected ranking
- SR = Special ranking
- SE = Special exempt
- JE = Junior exempt
- JR = Junior Accelerator Programme entrant
- CO = College Accelerator Programme entrant
- NG = Next Gen Accelerator Program entrant
- w/o = Walkover
- r = Retired
- d = Defaulted

=== Finals ===
Semifinals
1	(France) Hugo Gaston	6	2	6
(France) Clément Chidekh	3	6	2
(Germany) Patrick Zahraj	6^{3}	2
2	(Switzerland) Stan Wawrinka	7^{7}	6

Final
1	(France) Hugo Gaston	6	6
2	(Switzerland) Stan Wawrinka	4	4

=== Top half ===
First round
1	(France) H Gaston	6	7
(Germany) C Negritu	2	5
(Kazakhstan) M Kukushkin	5	3
Q	(France) E Couacaud	7	6
(Ivory Coast) E Coulibaly	6	6^{0}	6
Q	(France) Leo Raquillet	4	7^{7}	2
(France) T Paris	2	4
6	(France) S Gueymard Wayenburg	6	6
3	(France) H Mayot	6	6
(France) R Bertrand	0	3
Alt	(France) G Barrère	6	6
WC	(France) Daniel Jade	1	2
Alt	(Ukraine) Vadym Ursu	0	2
(France) C Chidekh	6	6
Q	(France) M Janvier	7^{7}	6
LL	E Gerasimov	6^{5}	4

Second round
1	(France) H Gaston	6	1
Q	(France) E Couacaud	3	0^{r}
(Ivory Coast) E Coulibaly	7^{8}	6
6	(France) S Gueymard Wayenburg	6^{6}	3
3	(France) H Mayot	6	7^{10}
Alt	(France) G Barrère	3	6^{8}
(France) C Chidekh	6	6^{4}	6
Q	(France) M Janvier	3	7^{7}	4

Quarterfinals
1	(France) H Gaston	7	6
(Ivory Coast) E Coulibaly	5	2
3	(France) H Mayot	2	6	4
(France) C Chidekh	6	2	6

Semifinals
1	(France) H Gaston	6	2	6
(France) C Chidekh	3	6	2

=== Bottom half ===
First round
8	(France) A Bouquier	4	6	6
(Czech Republic) M Gengel	6	3	4
Q	Nikolay Vylegzhanin	6	6^{2}	2
(Germany) P Zahraj	3	7^{7}	6
Q	(United States) C Kingsley	6	7^{7}
WC	(France) Sean Cuenin	4	6^{5}
(France) M Martineau	3	6	5
4	(France) T Droguet	6	3	7
7	(Italy) F Cinà	6	6
(France) L Poullain	1	3
(Belgium) M Geerts	6	3	6
LL	(France) Robin Catry	4	6	4
WC	(France) Maé Malige	4	3
(France) D Added	6	6
Q	(France) K de Schepper	4	4
2	(Switzerland) S Wawrinka	6	6

Second round
8	(France) A Bouquier	6	6^{5}	4
(Germany) P Zahraj	1	7^{7}	6
Q	(United States) C Kingsley	6	5	6
4	(France) T Droguet	2	7	3
7	(Italy) F Cinà	2	6^{4}
(Belgium) M Geerts	6	7^{7}
(France) D Added	3	4
2	(Switzerland) S Wawrinka	6	6

Quarterfinals
(Germany) P Zahraj	6	3	6
Q	(United States) C Kingsley	4	6	3
(Belgium) M Geerts	6^{2}	5
2	(Switzerland) S Wawrinka	7^{7}	7

Semifinals
(Germany) P Zahraj	6^{3}	2
2	(Switzerland) S Wawrinka	7^{7}	6
