= 2019 Open de Rennes – Doubles =

Doubles
- 2019 Open de Rennes

Final
- Champions: (Netherlands) Sander Arends (Austria) Tristan-Samuel Weissborn
- Runners-up: (Netherlands) David Pel (Croatia) Antonio Šančić
- Score: 6–4, 6–4

Events
Singles	Doubles
← 2018 ·	Open de Rennes	· 2020 →

Sander Gillé and Joran Vliegen were the defending champions but chose not to defend their title.

Sander Arends and Tristan-Samuel Weissborn won the title after defeating David Pel and Antonio Šančić 6–4, 6–4 in the final.

== Seeds ==
1. (Chinese Taipei) Hsieh Cheng-peng / (Indonesia) Christopher Rungkat (first round)
2. (France) Fabrice Martin / (France) Hugo Nys (first round)
3. (Netherlands) Sander Arends / (Austria) Tristan-Samuel Weissborn (champions)
4. (Brazil) Fabrício Neis / (India) Purav Raja (semifinals)

== Draw ==
=== Key ===
- Q = Qualifier
- WC = Wild card
- LL = Lucky loser
- Alt = Alternate
- SE = Special exempt
- PR = Protected ranking
- ITF = ITF entry
- JE = Junior exempt
- w/o = Walkover
- r = Retired
- d = Defaulted
- SR = Special ranking

First round
1	(Chinese Taipei) C-p Hsieh (Indonesia) C Rungkat	0	2
(Austria) J Melzer (Slovakia) F Polášek	6	6
(France) J Eysseric (France) Q Halys	7	6
WC	(France) M Janvier (Bulgaria) D Kuzmanov	5	4
3	(Netherlands) S Arends (Austria) T-S Weissborn	7	7^{7}
WC	(France) Antoine Cornut-Chauvinc (France) B Paire	5	6^{2}
WC	(France) E Furness (France) M Guinard	6^{4}	3
(Australia) R Junaid (Canada) A Shamasdin	7^{7}	6
ITF	(France) G Jacq (France) Hugo Voljacques	7	3	[10]
(Canada) F Auger-Aliassime (Italy) J Ocleppo	5	6	[7]
ITF	(Spain) J Barranco Cosano (Italy) R Brancaccio	4	5
4	(Brazil) F Neis (India) P Raja	6	7
(Switzerland) L Margaroli (Spain) D Vega Hernández	7	7^{7}
(France) C Moutet (Ukraine) S Stakhovsky	5	6^{4}
(Netherlands) D Pel (Croatia) A Šančić	7^{7}	7^{7}
2	(France) F Martin (France) H Nys	6^{5}	6^{5}

Quarterfinals
(Austria) J Melzer (Slovakia) F Polášek	7	6
(France) J Eysseric (France) Q Halys	5	4
3	(Netherlands) S Arends (Austria) T-S Weissborn	6	7^{7}
(Australia) R Junaid (Canada) A Shamasdin	4	6^{3}
ITF	(France) G Jacq (France) H Voljacques	2	2
4	(Brazil) F Neis (India) P Raja	6	6
(Switzerland) L Margaroli (Spain) D Vega Hernández	3	4
(Netherlands) D Pel (Croatia) A Šančić	6	6

Semifinals
(Austria) J Melzer (Slovakia) F Polášek	6	3	[6]
3	(Netherlands) S Arends (Austria) T-S Weissborn	3	6	[10]
4	(Brazil) F Neis (India) P Raja	3	4
(Netherlands) D Pel (Croatia) A Šančić	6	6

Final
3	(Netherlands) S Arends (Austria) T-S Weissborn	6	6
(Netherlands) D Pel (Croatia) A Šančić	4	4
