= 2020 Open de Rennes – Doubles =

Doubles
- 2020 Open de Rennes

Final
- Champions: (Croatia) Antonio Šančić (Austria) Tristan-Samuel Weissborn
- Runners-up: (Russia) Teymuraz Gabashvili (Slovakia) Lukáš Lacko
- Score: 7–5, 6–7^{(5–7)}, [10–7]

Events
Singles	Doubles
← 2019 ·	Open de Rennes	· 2021 →

Sander Arends and Tristan-Samuel Weissborn were the defending champions but only Weissborn chose to defend his title, partnering Antonio Šančić. Weissborn successfully defended his title after defeating Teymuraz Gabashvili and Lukáš Lacko 7–5, 6–7^{(5–7)}, [10–7] in the final.

== Seeds ==
1. (Croatia) Antonio Šančić / (Austria) Tristan-Samuel Weissborn (champions)
2. (India) Purav Raja / (Canada) Adil Shamasdin (quarterfinals)
3. (United States) Robert Galloway / (Mexico) Hans Hach Verdugo (first round)
4. (Croatia) Ivan Sabanov / (Croatia) Matej Sabanov (first round)

== Draw ==
=== Key ===
- Q = Qualifier
- WC = Wild card
- LL = Lucky loser
- Alt = Alternate
- SE = Special exempt
- PR = Protected ranking
- ITF = ITF entry
- JE = Junior exempt
- w/o = Walkover
- r = Retired
- d = Defaulted
- SR = Special ranking

First round
1	(Croatia) A Šančić (Austria) T-S Weissborn	6	6
(Belarus) U Ignatik (Austria) L Miedler	2	1
(France) D Added (France) A Olivetti	3	6	[10]
(Italy) A Arnaboldi (Italy) A Pellegrino	6	4	[6]
3	(United States) R Galloway (Mexico) H Hach Verdugo	6^{5}	6	[8]
(Serbia) D Petrović (Croatia) N Serdarušić	7^{7}	4	[10]
Alt	(Turkey) A Çelikbilek (Turkey) C İlkel	6	6
(Slovakia) L Klein (Russia) A Vatutin	2	2
WC	(France) E Furness (France) V Royer	2	2
PR	(Poland) J Janowicz (Poland) S Walków	6	6
WC	(France) M Guinard (France) A Rinderknech	7	6
4	(Croatia) I Sabanov (Croatia) M Sabanov	5	4
(Croatia) T Draganja (Russia) P Kotov	3	6^{0}
(Russia) T Gabashvili (Slovakia) L Lacko	6	7^{7}
WC	(France) Quentin Gueydan (France) Mathis Moysan	5	1
2	(India) P Raja (Canada) A Shamasdin	7	6

Quarterfinals
1	(Croatia) A Šančić (Austria) T-S Weissborn	6	6
(France) D Added (France) A Olivetti	1	3
(Serbia) D Petrović (Croatia) N Serdarušić	6	6
Alt	(Turkey) A Çelikbilek (Turkey) C İlkel	1	2
PR	(Poland) J Janowicz (Poland) S Walków	6^{4}	6^{4}
WC	(France) M Guinard (France) A Rinderknech	7^{7}	7^{7}
(Russia) T Gabashvili (Slovakia) L Lacko	7^{7}	6
2	(India) P Raja (Canada) A Shamasdin	6^{5}	4

Semifinals
1	(Croatia) A Šančić (Austria) T-S Weissborn	3	6	[10]
(Serbia) D Petrović (Croatia) N Serdarušić	6	3	[6]
WC	(France) M Guinard (France) A Rinderknech	3	6	[9]
(Russia) T Gabashvili (Slovakia) L Lacko	6	3	[11]

Final
1	(Croatia) A Šančić (Austria) T-S Weissborn	7	6^{5}	[10]
(Russia) T Gabashvili (Slovakia) L Lacko	5	7^{7}	[7]
