= 2010 Open de Rennes – Singles =

Singles
- 2010 Open de Rennes

Final
- Champion: (France) Marc Gicquel
- Runner-up: (Switzerland) Stéphane Bohli
- Score: 7–6^{(7–6)}, 4–6, 6–1

Events
Singles	Doubles
← 2009 ·	Open de Rennes	· 2011 →

Alejandro Falla was the defending champion, but decided not to participate this year.
Marc Gicquel won this tournament, by defeating 5th seed Stéphane Bohli 7–6^{(7–6)}, 4–6, 6–1 in the final.

== Seeds ==
1. (France) Arnaud Clément (quarterfinals)
2. (Slovakia) Lukáš Lacko (first round)
3. (France) Stéphane Robert (first round)
4. (Germany) Björn Phau (quarterfinals)
5. (Switzerland) Stéphane Bohli (final)
6. (France) David Guez (second round)
7. (Bulgaria) Grigor Dimitrov (second round)
8. (Serbia) Ilija Bozoljac (first round)

== Draw ==
=== Key ===
- Q = Qualifier
- WC = Wild card
- LL = Lucky loser
- Alt = Alternate
- SE = Special exempt
- PR = Protected ranking
- ITF = ITF entry
- JE = Junior exempt
- w/o = Walkover
- r = Retired
- d = Defaulted
- SR = Special ranking

=== Finals ===
Semifinals
PR	(Canada) Frank Dancevic	7^{8}	2	6^{9}
5	(Switzerland) Stéphane Bohli	6^{6}	6	7^{11}
(France) Marc Gicquel	6	6
(Spain) Roberto Bautista-Agut	1	2

Final
5	(Switzerland) Stéphane Bohli	6^{6}	6	1
(France) Marc Gicquel	7^{8}	4	6

=== Top half ===
First round
1	(France) A Clément	7^{7}	6
WC	(France) R Jouan	6^{3}	4
Q	(France) P-H Herbert	6	0	3
(France) J Ouanna	3	6	6
PR	(Canada) F Dancevic	7	7^{9}
Q	(Germany) M Bachinger	5	6^{7}
WC	(France) L Rochette	6	0	4
7	(Bulgaria) G Dimitrov	1	6	6
4	(Germany) B Phau	6	6
Q	(Morocco) R El Amrani	4	1
(France) B Paire	2	6	6^{3}
WC	(France) C-A Brézac	6	3	7^{7}
Q	(Finland) H Kontinen	7	6
(Czech Republic) L Rosol	5	4
(France) A Mannarino	6	1	5
5	(Switzerland) S Bohli	4	6	7

Second round
1	(France) A Clément	6	6
(France) J Ouanna	3	4
PR	(Canada) F Dancevic	7^{7}	7^{7}
7	(Bulgaria) G Dimitrov	6^{4}	6^{3}
4	(Germany) B Phau	6	4	6
WC	(France) C-A Brézac	2	6	1
Q	(Finland) H Kontinen	6^{4}	0
5	(Switzerland) S Bohli	7^{7}	6

Quarterfinals
1	(France) A Clément	7^{9}	4	4
PR	(Canada) F Dancevic	6^{7}	6	6
4	(Germany) B Phau	1	3
5	(Switzerland) S Bohli	6	6

Semifinals
PR	(Canada) F Dancevic	7^{8}	2	6^{9}
5	(Switzerland) S Bohli	6^{6}	6	7^{11}

=== Bottom half ===
First round
6	(France) D Guez	6	4	6
(Germany) D Gremelmayr	0	6	3
(France) V Millot	2	2
(Australia) M Ebden	6	6
WC	(Belgium) K Vliegen	6	6^{5}	3
(Netherlands) I Sijsling	4	7^{7}	6
(France) M Gicquel	6	6
3	(France) S Robert	3	4
8	(Serbia) I Bozoljac	7	3	6^{2}
(Belgium) N Desein	5	6	7^{7}
(Germany) D Kindlmann	6	2	1
(Republic of Ireland) C Niland	4	6	6
SE	(France) A Gensse	5	6^{1}
(Spain) R Bautista-Agut	7	7^{7}
(France) N Mahut	6^{8}	6	6
2	(Slovakia) L Lacko	7^{10}	2	4

Second round
6	(France) D Guez	2	2
(Australia) M Ebden	6	6
(Netherlands) I Sijsling	4	4
(France) M Gicquel	6	6
(Belgium) N Desein	6	1	4
(Republic of Ireland) C Niland	3	6	6
(Spain) R Bautista-Agut	6	6^{6}	6
(France) N Mahut	4	7^{8}	4

Quarterfinals
(Australia) M Ebden	3	1
(France) M Gicquel	6	6
(Republic of Ireland) C Niland	6	1	5
(Spain) R Bautista-Agut	3	6	7

Semifinals
(France) M Gicquel	6	6
(Spain) R Bautista-Agut	1	2
