= 2017 Open de Rennes – Singles =

Singles
- 2017 Open de Rennes

Final
- Champion: (Belarus) Uladzimir Ignatik
- Runner-up: (Russia) Andrey Rublev
- Score: 6–7^{(6–8)}, 6–3, 7–6^{(7–5)}

Events
| Singles | Doubles |
| ← 2015 · | Open de Rennes | · 2018 → |

Malek Jaziri was the defending champion but chose not to defend his title.

Uladzimir Ignatik won the title after defeating Andrey Rublev 6–7^{(6–8)}, 6–3, 7–6^{(7–5)} in the final.

== Seeds ==
1. (France) Jérémy Chardy (first round)
2. (France) Paul-Henri Mathieu (quarterfinals)
3. (Slovakia) Jozef Kovalík (second round)
4. (Ukraine) Sergiy Stakhovsky (second round)
5. (Argentina) Guido Andreozzi (second round)
6. (Czech Republic) Lukáš Rosol (second round)
7. (Russia) Evgeny Donskoy (first round, retired)
8. (Germany) Tobias Kamke (second round)

== Draw ==
=== Key ===
- Q = Qualifier
- WC = Wild card
- LL = Lucky loser
- Alt = Alternate
- SE = Special exempt
- PR = Protected ranking
- ITF = ITF entry
- JE = Junior exempt
- w/o = Walkover
- r = Retired
- d = Defaulted
- SR = Special ranking

=== Finals ===
Semifinals
(Russia) Andrey Rublev | 7^{7} | 7
PR | (Slovenia) Blaž Kavčič | 6^{5} | 5
(France) Mathias Bourgue | 4 | 4
LL | (Belarus) Uladzimir Ignatik | 6 | 6

Final
(Russia) Andrey Rublev | 7^{8} | 3 | 6^{5}
LL | (Belarus) Uladzimir Ignatik | 6^{6} | 6 | 7^{7}

=== Top half ===
First round
1 | (France) J Chardy | 4 | 6^{12}
(Russia) A Rublev | 6 | 7^{14}
(Slovenia) G Žemlja | 6 | 7^{8}
WC | (France) E Furness | 4 | 6^{6}
(Germany) D Brands | 5 | 4
(South Korea) D-h Lee | 7 | 6
Q | (United Kingdom) E Corrie | 6 | 2 | 3
6 | (Czech Republic) L Rosol | 4 | 6 | 6
4 | (Ukraine) S Stakhovsky | 6 | 5 | 6
Q | (France) R Boutillier | 3 | 7 | 2
PR | (Slovenia) B Kavčič | 4 | 6 | 6
Q | (Estonia) J Zopp | 6 | 1 | 4
WC | (France) G Blancaneaux | 5 | 3
(France) V Millot | 7 | 6
(Italy) S Napolitano | 6 | 3 | 4
5 | (Argentina) G Andreozzi | 2 | 6 | 6

Second round
(Russia) A Rublev | 6 | 7^{9}
(Slovenia) G Žemlja | 4 | 6^{7}
(South Korea) D-h Lee | 6 | 4 | 6
6 | (Czech Republic) L Rosol | 3 | 6 | 2
4 | (Ukraine) S Stakhovsky | 4 | 7^{7} | 6^{4}
PR | (Slovenia) B Kavčič | 6 | 6^{2} | 7^{7}
(France) V Millot | 7^{7} | 4 | 6
5 | (Argentina) G Andreozzi | 6^{4} | 6 | 2

Quarterfinals
(Russia) A Rublev | 6 | 3 | 6
(South Korea) D-h Lee | 4 | 6 | 4
PR | (Slovenia) B Kavčič | 7^{7} | 3 | 7
(France) V Millot | 6^{5} | 6 | 5

Semifinals
(Russia) A Rublev | 7^{7} | 7
PR | (Slovenia) B Kavčič | 6^{5} | 5

=== Bottom half ===
First round
7 | (Russia) E Donskoy | 1^{r}
(France) K de Schepper | 4
WC | (France) T Lamasine | 6^{5} | 7^{10} | 0
(Russia) T Gabashvili | 7^{7} | 6^{8} | 6
(France) M Bourgue | 6 | 6^{4} | 7
(Belgium) R Bemelmans | 4 | 7^{7} | 5
WC | (France) M Janvier | 3 | 5
3 | (Slovakia) J Kovalík | 6 | 7
8 | (Germany) T Kamke | 7^{7} | 4 | 6
(Hungary) M Fucsovics | 6^{3} | 6 | 4
LL | (Belarus) U Ignatik | 6 | 7^{7}
(Canada) S Diez | 2 | 6^{5}
(Belgium) A De Greef | 5 | 6 | 6
(Slovakia) N Gombos | 7 | 3 | 3
Q | (Greece) S Tsitsipas | 3 | 6 | 3
2 | (France) P-H Mathieu | 6 | 3 | 6

Second round
(France) K de Schepper | 4 | 3
(Russia) T Gabashvili | 6 | 6
(France) M Bourgue | 7^{7} | 6
3 | (Slovakia) J Kovalík | 6^{5} | 4
8 | (Germany) T Kamke | 4 | 6^{5}
LL | (Belarus) U Ignatik | 6 | 7^{7}
(Belgium) A De Greef | 7^{7} | 4 | 5
2 | (France) P-H Mathieu | 6^{1} | 6 | 7

Quarterfinals
(Russia) T Gabashvili | 1 | 6^{5}
(France) M Bourgue | 6 | 7^{7}
LL | (Belarus) U Ignatik | 6 | 6
2 | (France) P-H Mathieu | 4 | 4

Semifinals
(France) M Bourgue | 4 | 4
LL | (Belarus) U Ignatik | 6 | 6
