= 2009 Open de Rennes =

- Date: 12–18 October
- Edition: 4th
- Surface: Hard
- Location: Rennes, France

Champions

Singles
- (Colombia) Alejandro Falla

Doubles
- (United States) Eric Butorac / (Croatia) Lovro Zovko
← 2008 ·	Open de Rennes	· 2010 →

The 2009 Open de Tennis de Rennes was a professional tennis tournament played on indoor hard courts. It was the fourth edition of the tournament which was part of the 2009 ATP Challenger Tour. It took place in Rennes, France between 12 and 18 October 2009.

== ATP entrants ==
=== Seeds ===
Country	Player	Rank^{1}	Seed
FRA	Josselin Ouanna	88	1
GER	Daniel Brands	119	2
AUS	Carsten Ball	123	3
RSA	Kevin Anderson	128	4
COL	Alejandro Falla	131	5
FRA	Arnaud Clément	134	6
FRA	Stéphane Robert	135	7
BRA	Thiago Alves	147	8

- Rankings are as of October 5, 2009.

=== Other entrants ===
The following players received wildcards into the singles main draw:

- (France) Charles-Antoine Brézac
- (France) Romain Jouan
- (France) Gianni Mina
- (France) Julien Obry

The following players received entry from the qualifying draw:

- (Morocco) Rabie Chaki
- (France) Jérôme Haehnel
- (Poland) Jerzy Janowicz
- (Australia) Rameez Junaid

== Champions ==
=== Singles ===
(Colombia) Alejandro Falla def. (France) Thierry Ascione, 6–3, 6–2

=== Doubles ===
(United States) Eric Butorac / (Croatia) Lovro Zovko def. (South Africa) Kevin Anderson / (Slovakia) Dominik Hrbatý, 6–4, 3–6, [10–6]
