= 2026 Open de Rennes – Doubles =

Doubles
- 2026 Open de Rennes

Final
- Champions: (Netherlands) Sander Arends (Netherlands) Bart Stevens
- Runners-up: Ivan Liutarevich (United Kingdom) Joshua Paris
- Score: 6–1, 6–1

Events
Singles	Doubles
- Open de Rennes

Patrik Niklas-Salminen and Matěj Vocel were the defending champions but only Vocel chose to defend his title, partnering David Stevenson. They lost in the semifinals to Sander Arends and Bart Stevens.

Arends and Stevens won the title after defeating Ivan Liutarevich and Joshua Paris 6–1, 6–1 in the final.

== Seeds ==
1. (Netherlands) Sander Arends / (Netherlands) Bart Stevens (champions)
2. (France) Arthur Reymond / (France) Luca Sanchez (semifinals)
3. (United Kingdom) David Stevenson / (Czech Republic) Matěj Vocel (semifinals)
4. Ivan Liutarevich / (United Kingdom) Joshua Paris (final)

== Draw ==
Key

- Q = Qualifier
- WC = Wild card
- LL = Lucky loser
- Alt = Alternate
- ITF = ITF entry
- PR = Protected ranking
- SR = Special ranking
- SE = Special exempt
- JE = Junior exempt
- JR = Junior Accelerator Programme entrant
- CO = College Accelerator Programme entrant
- NG = Next Gen Accelerator Program entrant
- w/o = Walkover
- r = Retired
- d = Defaulted

First round
1	(Netherlands) S Arends (Netherlands) B Stevens	6	6
(France) S Gueymard Wayenburg (France) M Martineau	4	3
(United Kingdom) T Hands (United Kingdom) B Harris	3	4
(France) U Blanchet (Australia) T Schoolkate	6	6
3	(United Kingdom) D Stevenson (Czech Republic) M Vocel	7^{7}	4	[10]
(Spain) A Barroso Campos (Spain) I Montes de la Torre	6^{5}	6	[8]
(France) D Added (Germany) D Masur	6	6
Alt	(France) Yanis Ghazouani Durand (France) Arthur Nagel	4	2
(India) VS Prashanth (India) R Ramanathan	4	4
(United States) Zachary Fuchs (Venezuela) B Pérez	6	6
(United Kingdom) F Bass (United Kingdom) S Duncan	4	5
4	I Liutarevich (United Kingdom) J Paris	6	7
(Canada) J Boulais (Germany) P Zahraj	6	6
(United States) K Poling (United States) J Sheehy	4	4
WC	(France) K de Schepper (France) Leo Raquillet	5	6^{6}
2	(France) A Reymond (France) L Sanchez	7	7^{8}

Quarterfinals
1	(Netherlands) S Arends (Netherlands) B Stevens	6	7^{7}
(France) U Blanchet (Australia) T Schoolkate	4	6^{2}
3	(United Kingdom) D Stevenson (Czech Republic) M Vocel	6	3	[10]
(France) D Added (Germany) D Masur	3	6	[7]
(United States) Z Fuchs (Venezuela) B Pérez	6	2	[5]
4	I Liutarevich (United Kingdom) J Paris	3	6	[10]
(Canada) J Boulais (Germany) P Zahraj	4	4
2	(France) A Reymond (France) L Sanchez	6	6

Semifinals
1	(Netherlands) S Arends (Netherlands) B Stevens	7^{7}	6
3	(United Kingdom) D Stevenson (Czech Republic) M Vocel	6^{5}	2
4	I Liutarevich (United Kingdom) J Paris	6	7
2	(France) A Reymond (France) L Sanchez	4	5

Final
1	(Netherlands) S Arends (Netherlands) B Stevens	6	6
4	I Liutarevich (United Kingdom) J Paris	1	1
