= 2010 Open de Rennes – Doubles =

Doubles
- 2010 Open de Rennes

Final
- Champions: (United States) Scott Lipsky (United States) David Martin
- Runners-up: (Germany) Denis Gremelmayr (Germany) Björn Phau
- Score: 6–4, 5–7, [12–10]

Events
Singles	Doubles
← 2009 ·	Open de Rennes	· 2011 →

Eric Butorac and Lovro Zovko were the defending champions, but decided to not compete together this year.
Butorac partnered with Harsh Mankad and Zovko with Dušan Vemić, but they all lost in the first round (Butorac/Mankad was eliminated by Denis Gremelmayr and Björn Phau, Vemić/Zovko was eliminated by Johan Brunström and Lukáš Rosol).
Scott Lipsky and David Martin won the final against Gremelmayr and Phau 6–4, 5–7, [12–10].

== Seeds ==
1. (Germany) Philipp Marx / (Slovakia) Igor Zelenay (second round)
2. (Serbia) Dušan Vemić / (Croatia) Lovro Zovko (first round)
3. (United States) Eric Butorac / (India) Harsh Mankad (first round)
4. (United States) Scott Lipsky / (United States) David Martin (champions)

== Draw ==
=== Key ===
- Q = Qualifier
- WC = Wild card
- LL = Lucky loser
- Alt = Alternate
- SE = Special exempt
- PR = Protected ranking
- ITF = ITF entry
- JE = Junior exempt
- w/o = Walkover
- r = Retired
- d = Defaulted
- SR = Special ranking

=== Draw ===
First round
1	(Germany) P Marx (Slovakia) I Zelenay	6	4	[10]
(France) S Robert (Netherlands) I Sijsling	3	6	[6]
(Switzerland) Y Allegro (Austria) M Slanar	1	6^{3}
(United Kingdom) J Delgado (United Kingdom) J Marray	6	7^{7}
4	(United States) S Lipsky (United States) D Martin	6	6
WC	(France) R Jouan (France) V Millot	2	2
WC	(France) M Gicquel (France) D Guez	4	6
(United States) B Battistone (Sweden) A Siljeström	6	6
(Thailand) Sa Ratiwatana (Thailand) So Ratiwatana	5	3
WC	(France) C-A Brezac (France) V Stouff	7	6
(Germany) D Gremelmayr (Germany) B Phau	4	6	[10]
3	(United States) E Butorac (India) H Mankad	6	3	[5]
(South Africa) J Coetzee (Poland) M Kowalczyk	3	6^{7}
(United States) J Cerretani (Czech Republic) D Škoch	6	7^{9}
(Sweden) J Brunström (Czech Republic) L Rosol	6	4	[10]
2	(Serbia) D Vemić (Croatia) L Zovko	4	6	[8]

Quarterfinals
1	(Germany) P Marx (Slovakia) I Zelenay	6	5	[12]
(United Kingdom) J Delgado (United Kingdom) J Marray	4	7	[14]
4	(United States) S Lipsky (United States) D Martin	7^{7}	6
(United States) B Battistone (Sweden) A Siljeström	6^{4}	4
WC	(France) C-A Brezac (France) V Stouff	1	3
(Germany) D Gremelmayr (Germany) B Phau	6	6
(United States) J Cerretani (Czech Republic) D Škoch	7^{7}	6
(Sweden) J Brunström (Czech Republic) L Rosol	6^{4}	3

Semifinals
(United Kingdom) J Delgado (United Kingdom) J Marray	4	6	[7]
4	(United States) S Lipsky (United States) D Martin	6	3	[10]
(Germany) D Gremelmayr (Germany) B Phau	6	7^{8}
(United States) J Cerretani (Czech Republic) D Škoch	4	6^{6}

Finals
4	(United States) S Lipsky (United States) D Martin	6	5	[12]
(Germany) D Gremelmayr (Germany) B Phau	4	7	[10]
