= 2013 Open de Rennes – Singles =

Singles
- 2013 Open de Rennes

Final
- Champion: (France) Nicolas Mahut
- Runner-up: (France) Kenny de Schepper
- Score: 6–3, 7–6^{(7–3)}

Events
Singles	Doubles
← 2012 ·	Open de Rennes	· 2014 →

Kenny de Schepper was the defending champion, but lost to Nicolas Mahut in the final 6–3, 7–6^{(7–3)}.

== Seeds ==
1. (France) Kenny de Schepper (final)
2. (France) Nicolas Mahut (champion)
3. (France) Guillaume Rufin (first round)
4. (Netherlands) Jesse Huta Galung (first round)
5. (Czech Republic) Jan Hájek (second round)
6. (France) Marc Gicquel (semifinals)
7. (Slovakia) Andrej Martin (quarterfinals)
8. (Romania) Marius Copil (second round)

== Draw ==
Key

- Q = Qualifier
- WC = Wild card
- LL = Lucky loser
- Alt = Alternate
- ITF = ITF entry
- PR = Protected ranking
- SR = Special ranking
- SE = Special exempt
- JE = Junior exempt
- JR = Junior Accelerator Programme entrant
- CO = College Accelerator Programme entrant
- NG = Next Gen Accelerator Program entrant
- w/o = Walkover
- r = Retired
- d = Defaulted

=== Finals ===
Semifinals
1/WC	(France) Kenny de Schepper	4	7^{7}	6
(France) Maxime Teixeira	6	6^{5}	2
6	(France) Marc Gicquel	3	4
2/WC	(France) Nicolas Mahut	6	6

Final
1/WC	(France) Kenny de Schepper	3	6^{3}
2/WC	(France) Nicolas Mahut	6	7^{7}

=== Top half ===
First round
1/WC	(France) K de Schepper	6	4	6
(France) F Serra	1	6	3
(France) P-H Herbert	6^{6}	3
Q	(Germany) B Phau	7^{8}	6
Q	(Belgium) K Coppejans	6	6^{3}	6
Q	(Estonia) J Zopp	2	7^{7}	3
Q	(France) C Lestienne	2	1
5	(Czech Republic) J Hájek	6	6
4	(Netherlands) J Huta Galung	6	6^{5}	3
(France) M Teixeira	3	7^{7}	6
(Bosnia and Herzegovina) M Bašić	6^{5}	4
(Austria) M Fischer	7^{7}	6
(Canada) F Dancevic	7^{8}	6^{3}	0
(Italy) F Cipolla	6^{6}	7^{7}	6
(Spain) A Menéndez-Maceiras	6^{3}	3
7	(Slovakia) A Martin	7^{7}	6

Second round
1/WC	(France) K de Schepper	4	6	7^{11}
Q	(Germany) B Phau	6	3	6^{9}
Q	(Belgium) K Coppejans	6	6
5	(Czech Republic) J Hájek	1	1
(France) M Teixeira	6	6
(Austria) M Fischer	1	3
(Italy) F Cipolla	1	4
7	(Slovakia) A Martin	6	6

Quarterfinals
1/WC	(France) K de Schepper	6	6
Q	(Belgium) K Coppejans	0	3
(France) M Teixeira	6	6
7	(Slovakia) A Martin	4	3

Semifinals
1/WC	(France) K de Schepper	4	7^{7}	6
(France) M Teixeira	6	6^{5}	2

=== Bottom half ===
First round
6	(France) M Gicquel	6	6
(Austria) D Thiem	4	3
(Switzerland) H Laaksonen	4	2
(Italy) M Viola	6	6
(France) D Guez	4	4
(Netherlands) T Schoorel	6	6
(Germany) M Berrer	6	7^{8}
3/WC	(France) G Rufin	2	6^{6}
8	(Romania) M Copil	6	6
PR	(Germany) A Beck	3	3
(Germany) D Brown	3	6^{5}
WC	(France) J Ouanna	6	7^{7}
(Slovakia) N Gombos	7^{7}	7
(Ukraine) I Marchenko	6^{5}	5
(Belgium) R Bemelmans	3	7	6^{3}
2/WC	(France) N Mahut	6	5	7^{7}

Second round
6	(France) M Gicquel	6	6
(Italy) M Viola	2	4
(Netherlands) T Schoorel	3	4
(Germany) M Berrer	6	6
8	(Romania) M Copil	6^{2}	7^{7}	2
WC	(France) J Ouanna	7^{7}	6^{3}	6
(Slovakia) N Gombos	2	4
2/WC	(France) N Mahut	6	6

Quarterfinals
6	(France) M Gicquel	4	6	6
(Germany) M Berrer	6	2	2
WC	(France) J Ouanna	1	6	5
2/WC	(France) N Mahut	6	2	7

Semifinals
6	(France) M Gicquel	3	4
2/WC	(France) N Mahut	6	6
