= 2018 Open de Rennes – Doubles =

Doubles
- 2018 Open de Rennes

Final
- Champions: (Belgium) Sander Gillé (Belgium) Joran Vliegen
- Runners-up: (Netherlands) Sander Arends (Croatia) Antonio Šančić
- Score: 6–3, 6–7^{(1–7)}, [10–7]

Events
| Singles | Doubles |
| ← 2017 · | Open de Rennes | · 2019 → |

Evgeny Donskoy and Mikhail Elgin were the defending champions but chose not to defend their title.

Sander Gillé and Joran Vliegen won the title after defeating Sander Arends and Antonio Šančić 6–3, 6–7^{(1–7)}, [10–7] in the final.

== Seeds ==
1. (France) Jonathan Eysseric / (France) Hugo Nys (semifinals)
2. (Netherlands) Sander Arends / (Croatia) Antonio Šančić (final)
3. (Monaco) Romain Arneodo / (Austria) Tristan-Samuel Weissborn (quarterfinals)
4. (Belgium) Sander Gillé / (Belgium) Joran Vliegen (champions)

== Draw ==
=== Key ===
- Q = Qualifier
- WC = Wild card
- LL = Lucky loser
- Alt = Alternate
- SE = Special exempt
- PR = Protected ranking
- ITF = ITF entry
- JE = Junior exempt
- w/o = Walkover
- r = Retired
- d = Defaulted
- SR = Special ranking

First round
1 | (France) J Eysseric (France) H Nys | 7^{7} | 6
(Lithuania) R Berankis (Portugal) G Elias | 6^{4} | 0
(Japan) T Matsui (Italy) A Motti | 1 | 7^{7} | [6]
(France) K de Schepper (France) G Sakharov | 6 | 6^{5} | [10]
4 | (Belgium) S Gillé (Belgium) J Vliegen | 6 | 6
WC | (France) C Hemery (France) L Lokoli | 4 | 3
(United Kingdom) S Clayton (United Kingdom) J O'Mara | 4 | 7^{8} | [8]
(Germany) D Brown (Netherlands) D Pel | 6 | 6^{6} | [10]
WC | (France) M Guinard (France) M Janvier | 2 | 6 | [6]
(India) S Balaji (India) V Vardhan | 6 | 4 | [10]
(Belarus) U Ignatik (Japan) Y Uchiyama | 3 | 4
3 | (Monaco) R Arneodo (Austria) T-S Weissborn | 6 | 6
(Ukraine) S Stakhovsky (Russia) M Youzhny | 6 | 6
(Croatia) M Draganja (Croatia) T Draganja | 4 | 4
WC | (France) E Furness (France) T Lamasine | 2 | 4
2 | (Netherlands) S Arends (Croatia) A Šančić | 6 | 6

Quarterfinals
1 | (France) J Eysseric (France) H Nys | 6 | 6
(France) K de Schepper (France) G Sakharov | 4 | 0
4 | (Belgium) S Gillé (Belgium) J Vliegen | 6 | 6
(Germany) D Brown (Netherlands) D Pel | 3 | 2
(India) S Balaji (India) V Vardhan | 3 | 7^{7} | [10]
3 | (Monaco) R Arneodo (Austria) T-S Weissborn | 6 | 6^{4} | [7]
(Ukraine) S Stakhovsky (Russia) M Youzhny
2 | (Netherlands) S Arends (Croatia) A Šančić | w/o

Semifinals
1 | (France) J Eysseric (France) H Nys | 4 | 7^{8} | [7]
4 | (Belgium) S Gillé (Belgium) J Vliegen | 6 | 6^{6} | [10]
(India) S Balaji (India) V Vardhan | 4 | 4
2 | (Netherlands) S Arends (Croatia) A Šančić | 6 | 6

Final
4 | (Belgium) S Gillé (Belgium) J Vliegen | 6 | 6^{1} | [10]
2 | (Netherlands) S Arends (Croatia) A Šančić | 3 | 7^{7} | [7]
