= 2013 Open de Rennes =

- Date: 7–13 October
- Edition: 8th
- Surface: Hard
- Location: Rennes, France

Champions

Singles
- (France) Nicolas Mahut

Doubles
- (Romania) Florin Mergea / (Austria) Oliver Marach
← 2012 ·	Open de Rennes	· 2014 →

The 2013 Open de Rennes was a professional tennis tournament played on hard courts. It was the eighth edition of the tournament which was part of the 2013 ATP Challenger Tour. It took place in Rennes, France between 7 and 13 October 2013.

== Singles main-draw entrants ==
=== Seeds ===
Country	Player	Rank^{1}	Seed
FRA	Kenny de Schepper	67	1
FRA	Nicolas Mahut	68	2
FRA	Guillaume Rufin	84	3
NED	Jesse Huta Galung	96	4
CZE	Jan Hájek	101	5
FRA	Marc Gicquel	110	6
SVK	Andrej Martin	126	7
ROU	Marius Copil	130	8

- ^{1} Rankings are as of September 30, 2013.

=== Other entrants ===
The following players received wildcards into the singles main draw:

- (France) Kenny de Schepper
- (France) Nicolas Mahut
- (France) Josselin Ouanna
- (France) Guillaume Rufin

The following players used protected ranking to get into the singles main draw:

- (Germany) Andreas Beck

The following players received entry from the qualifying draw:

- (Belgium) Kimmer Coppejans
- (France) Constant Lestienne
- (Germany) Björn Phau
- (Estonia) Jürgen Zopp

== Champions ==
=== Singles ===
- (France) Nicolas Mahut def. (France) Kenny de Schepper 6–3, 7–6^{(7–3)}

=== Doubles ===
- (Romania) Florin Mergea / (Austria) Oliver Marach def. (United States) Nicholas Monroe / (Germany) Simon Stadler 6–4, 3–6, [10–7]
