= 2014 Open de Rennes – Doubles =

Doubles
- 2014 Open de Rennes

Final
- Champions: (Germany) Tobias Kamke (Germany) Philipp Marx
- Runners-up: (Czech Republic) František Čermák (Israel) Jonathan Erlich
- Score: 3–6, 6–2, [10–3]

Events
Singles	Doubles
- Open de Rennes

Florin Mergea and Oliver Marach were the defending champions, but they did not participate.

Tobias Kamke and Philipp Marx won the title, defeating František Čermák and Jonathan Erlich 3–6, 6–2, [10–3] in the final.

== Seeds ==
1. (United Kingdom) Colin Fleming / (United Kingdom) Jonathan Marray (quarterfinals)
2. (United Kingdom) Ken Skupski / (United Kingdom) Neal Skupski (quarterfinals, withdrew)
3. (Czech Republic) František Čermák / (Israel) Jonathan Erlich (final)
4. (Germany) Martin Emmrich / (Germany) Gero Kretschmer (semifinals)

== Draw ==
Key

- Q = Qualifier
- WC = Wild card
- LL = Lucky loser
- Alt = Alternate
- ITF = ITF entry
- PR = Protected ranking
- SR = Special ranking
- SE = Special exempt
- JE = Junior exempt
- JR = Junior Accelerator Programme entrant
- CO = College Accelerator Programme entrant
- NG = Next Gen Accelerator Program entrant
- w/o = Walkover
- r = Retired
- d = Defaulted

=== Draw ===
First round
(Germany) D Brown (Germany) C Kas	6	6
(Spain) I Cervantes (Spain) P Riba	1	4
(France) O Charroin (Czech Republic) J Pospíšil	3	7^{7}	[10]
(Romania) M Copil (Romania) V Hănescu	6	6^{5}	[6]
(Netherlands) Romano Frantzen (United Kingdom) D Walsh	6^{4}	1
(United States) J Cerretani (Sweden) A Siljeström	7^{7}	6
(Brazil) T Bellucci (Brazil) A Sá	4	2
4/WC	(Germany) M Emmrich (Germany) G Kretschmer	6	6
(France) K de Schepper (New Zealand) M Venus	6	3	[8]
(Germany) T Kamke (Germany) P Marx	4	6	[10]

Quarterfinals
1	(United Kingdom) C Fleming (United Kingdom) J Marray	4	4
(Germany) D Brown (Germany) C Kas	6	6
3	(Czech Republic) F Čermák (Israel) J Erlich	6^{5}	6	[10]
(France) O Charroin (Czech Republic) J Pospíšil	7^{7}	2	[7]
(United States) J Cerretani (Sweden) A Siljeström	6	6^{14}	[8]
4/WC	(Germany) M Emmrich (Germany) G Kretschmer	4	7^{16}	[10]
(Germany) T Kamke (Germany) P Marx	w/o
2	(United Kingdom) K Skupski (United Kingdom) N Skupski

Semifinals
(Germany) D Brown (Germany) C Kas	5	7^{7}	[8]
3	(Czech Republic) F Čermák (Israel) J Erlich	7	6^{3}	[10]
4/WC	(Germany) M Emmrich (Germany) G Kretschmer	6	3	[7]
(Germany) T Kamke (Germany) P Marx	4	6	[10]

Final
3	(Czech Republic) F Čermák (Israel) J Erlich	6	2	[3]
(Germany) T Kamke (Germany) P Marx	3	6	[10]
