= 2017 Open de Rennes =

- Date: 24–29 January
- Edition: 10th
- Surface: Hard
- Location: Rennes, France

Champions

Singles
- (Belarus) Uladzimir Ignatik

Doubles
- (Russia) Evgeny Donskoy / (Russia) Mikhail Elgin
← 2015 ·	Open de Rennes	· 2018 →

The 2017 Open de Rennes was a professional tennis tournament played on hard courts. It was the eleventh edition of the tournament and part of the 2017 ATP Challenger Tour. It took place in Rennes, France between 24 and 29 January 2017.

== Singles main-draw entrants ==
=== Seeds ===
Country	Player	Rank^{1}	Seed
FRA	Jérémy Chardy	72	1
FRA	Paul-Henri Mathieu	75	2
SVK	Jozef Kovalík	110	3
UKR	Sergiy Stakhovsky	111	4
ARG	Guido Andreozzi	116	5
CZE	Lukáš Rosol	118	6
RUS	Evgeny Donskoy	125	7
GER	Tobias Kamke	126	8

- ^{1} Rankings are as of January 16, 2016.

=== Other entrants ===
The following players received wildcards into the singles main draw:

- (France) Geoffrey Blancaneaux
- (France) Evan Furness
- (France) Maxime Janvier
- (France) Tristan Lamasine

The following player received entry into the singles main draw using a protected ranking:

- (Slovenia) Blaž Kavčič

The following players received entry from the qualifying draw:

- (France) Rémi Boutillier
- (United Kingdom) Edward Corrie
- (Greece) Stefanos Tsitsipas
- (Estonia) Jürgen Zopp

The following player received entry as a lucky loser:

- (Belarus) Uladzimir Ignatik

== Champions ==
=== Singles ===
- (Belarus) Uladzimir Ignatik def. (Russia) Andrey Rublev 6–7^{(6–8)}, 6–3, 7–6^{(7–5)}.

=== Doubles ===
- (Russia) Evgeny Donskoy / (Russia) Mikhail Elgin def. (Austria) Julian Knowle / (United Kingdom) Jonathan Marray 6–4, 3–6, [11–9].
