= 2013 Open de Rennes – Doubles =

Doubles
- 2013 Open de Rennes

Final
- Champions: (Romania) Florin Mergea (Austria) Oliver Marach
- Runners-up: (United States) Nicholas Monroe (Germany) Simon Stadler
- Score: 6–4, 3–6, [10–7]

Events
Singles	Doubles
- Open de Rennes

Philipp Marx and Florin Mergea were the defending champions but decided not to participate together.
Marx partnered with Dustin Brown but lost to Michael Berrer and Franko Škugor in the quarterfinal.
Mergea partnered with Oliver Marach and won the title over Nicholas Monroe and Simon Stadler 6–4, 3–6, [10–7].

== Seeds ==
1. (United States) Eric Butorac / (South Africa) Raven Klaasen (first round)
2. (Colombia) Juan Sebastián Cabal / (Colombia) Robert Farah (first round)
3. (United States) Nicholas Monroe / (Germany) Simon Stadler (final)
4. (Romania) Florin Mergea / (Austria) Oliver Marach (champions)

== Draw ==
Key

- Q = Qualifier
- WC = Wild card
- LL = Lucky loser
- Alt = Alternate
- ITF = ITF entry
- PR = Protected ranking
- SR = Special ranking
- SE = Special exempt
- JE = Junior exempt
- JR = Junior Accelerator Programme entrant
- CO = College Accelerator Programme entrant
- NG = Next Gen Accelerator Program entrant
- w/o = Walkover
- r = Retired
- d = Defaulted

=== Draw ===
First round
1	(United States) E Butorac (South Africa) R Klaasen	3	4
WC	(France) P-H Herbert (France) N Renavand	6	6
(Italy) F Cipolla (Czech Republic) J Hájek	3	5
(United Kingdom) K Skupski (United Kingdom) N Skupski	6	7
4	(Austria) O Marach (Romania) F Mergea	6	6
(United Kingdom) J Delgado (Australia) J Kerr	2	2
(Germany) G Kretschmer (Sweden) A Siljeström	3	3
PR	(Germany) A Beck (Germany) A Satschko	6	6
WC	(France) Antoine Benneteau (France) F Martin	6^{4}	7^{7}	[9]
(Croatia) M Draganja (Spain) A Menéndez-Maceiras	7^{7}	6^{4}	[11]
WC	(France) A Olivetti (France) M Teixeira	6^{3}	4
3	(United States) N Monroe (Germany) S Stadler	7^{7}	6
PR	(Slovakia) A Martin (Estonia) J Zopp	7^{8}	4	[5]
(Germany) M Berrer (Croatia) F Škugor	6^{6}	6	[10]
(Germany) D Brown (Austria) P Marx	7^{7}	6
2	(Colombia) JS Cabal (Colombia) R Farah	6^{4}	2

Quarterfinals
WC	(France) P-H Herbert (France) N Renavand	6	7^{7}
(United Kingdom) K Skupski (United Kingdom) N Skupski	4	6^{3}
4	(Austria) O Marach (Romania) F Mergea	6	7
PR	(Germany) A Beck (Germany) A Satschko	2	5
(Croatia) M Draganja (Spain) A Menéndez-Maceiras	6^{2}	5
3	(United States) N Monroe (Germany) S Stadler	7^{7}	7
(Germany) M Berrer (Croatia) F Škugor	6^{7}	7^{7}	[8]
(Germany) D Brown (Austria) P Marx	7^{9}	6^{2}	[10]

Semifinals
WC	(France) P-H Herbert (France) N Renavand	2	4
4	(Austria) O Marach (Romania) F Mergea	6	6
3	(United States) N Monroe (Germany) S Stadler	6	6
(Germany) D Brown (Austria) P Marx	3	3

Final
4	(Austria) O Marach (Romania) F Mergea	6	3	[10]
3	(United States) N Monroe (Germany) S Stadler	4	6	[7]
