= 2011 Open de Rennes =

- Date: 10–16 October
- Edition: 6th
- Surface: Hard
- Location: Rennes, France

Champions

Singles
- (France) Julien Benneteau

Doubles
- (Germany) Martin Emmrich / (Sweden) Andreas Siljeström
← 2010 ·	Open de Rennes	· 2012 →

The 2011 Open de Rennes was a professional tennis tournament played on hard courts. It was the sixth edition of the tournament which was part of the 2011 ATP Challenger Tour. It took place in Rennes, France between 10 and 16 October 2011.

== ATP entrants ==
=== Seeds ===
Country	Player	Rank^{1}	Seed
LUX	Gilles Müller	42	1
FRA	Adrian Mannarino	68	2
FRA	Julien Benneteau	73	3
BEL	Olivier Rochus	79	4
FRA	Nicolas Mahut	83	5
BEL	Steve Darcis	89	6
COL	Alejandro Falla	93	7
GER	Cedrik-Marcel Stebe	105	8

- ^{1} Rankings are as of October 3, 2011.

=== Other entrants ===
The following players received wildcards into the singles main draw:

- (France) Grégoire Burquier
- (France) Arnaud Clément
- (France) Jonathan Dasnières de Veigy
- (Luxembourg) Gilles Müller

The following players received entry from the qualifying draw:

- (Serbia) Ilija Bozoljac
- (United Kingdom) Daniel Evans
- (Croatia) Nikola Mektić
- (Czech Republic) Ivo Minář

== Champions ==
=== Singles ===
(France) Julien Benneteau def. (Belgium) Olivier Rochus, 6–4, 6–3

=== Doubles ===
(Germany) Martin Emmrich / (Sweden) Andreas Siljeström def. (France) Kenny de Schepper / (France) Édouard Roger-Vasselin, 6–4, 6–4
