= 2014 Open de Rennes =

- Date: 6–12 October
- Edition: 8th
- Surface: Hard
- Location: Rennes, France

Champions

Singles
- (Belgium) Steve Darcis

Doubles
- (Germany) Tobias Kamke / (Germany) Philipp Marx
← 2013 ·	Open de Rennes	· 2015 →

The 2014 Open de Rennes was a professional tennis tournament played on hard courts. It was the ninth edition of the tournament which was part of the 2014 ATP Challenger Tour. It took place in Rennes, France between 6 and 12 October 2014.

== Singles main-draw entrants ==
=== Seeds ===
Country	Player	Rank^{1}	Seed
GER	Jan-Lennard Struff	53	1
BRA	Thomaz Bellucci	68	2
FRA	Paul-Henri Mathieu	81	3
ISR	Dudi Sela	87	4
AUT	Andreas Haider-Maurer	94	5
GER	Dustin Brown	96	6
GER	Andreas Beck	100	7
GER	Tobias Kamke	102	8

- ^{1} Rankings are as of September 29, 2014.

=== Other entrants ===
The following players received wildcards into the singles main draw:

- (France) Paul-Henri Mathieu
- (France) Tristan Lamasine
- (France) Enzo Couacaud
- (France) Marc Gicquel

The following players used protected ranking to get into the singles main draw:

- (Belgium) Steve Darcis

The following players received entry from the qualifying draw:

- (Germany) Tim Pütz
- (Netherlands) Robin Haase
- (Russia) Karen Khachanov
- (Austria) Martin Fischer

== Champions ==
=== Singles ===
- (Belgium) Steve Darcis def. (France) Nicolas Mahut, 6–2, 6–4

=== Doubles ===
- (Germany) Tobias Kamke / (Germany) Philipp Marx def. (Czech Republic) František Čermák / (Israel) Jonathan Erlich, 3–6, 6–2, [10–3]
