= 2010 Open de Rennes =

- Date: 12–17 October
- Edition: 5th
- Surface: Hard
- Location: Rennes, France

Champions

Singles
- (France) Marc Gicquel

Doubles
- (United States) Scott Lipsky / (United States) David Martin
← 2009 ·	Open de Rennes	· 2011 →

The 2010 Open de Rennes was a professional tennis tournament played on hard courts. It was the fifth edition of the tournament which was part of the 2010 ATP Challenger Tour. It took place in Rennes, France between 12 and 17 October 2010.

== ATP entrants ==
=== Seeds ===
Country	Player	Rank^{1}	Seed
FRA	Arnaud Clément	62	1
SVK	Lukáš Lacko	71	2
FRA	Stéphane Robert	94	3
GER	Björn Phau	99	4
SUI	Stéphane Bohli	125	5
FRA	David Guez	131	6
BUL	Grigor Dimitrov	135	7
SRB	Ilija Bozoljac	136	8

- Rankings are as of October 4, 2010.

=== Other entrants ===
The following players received wildcards into the singles main draw:

- (France) Charles-Antoine Brézac
- (France) Romain Jouan
- (France) Laurent Rochette
- (Belgium) Kristof Vliegen

The following players received entry as a Special Exempt into the singles main draw:

- (France) Augustin Gensse

The following players received entry from the qualifying draw:

- (Germany) Matthias Bachinger
- (Morocco) Reda El Amrani
- (France) Pierre-Hugues Herbert
- (Finland) Henri Kontinen

== Champions ==
=== Singles ===
(France) Marc Gicquel def. (Switzerland) Stéphane Bohli, 7–6^{(8–6)}, 4–6, 6–1

=== Doubles ===
(United States) Scott Lipsky / (United States) David Martin def. (Germany) Denis Gremelmayr / (Germany) Björn Phau, 6–4, 5–7, [12–10]
