= 2020 Open de Rennes =

- Date: 20–26 January
- Edition: 14th
- Surface: Hard
- Location: Rennes, France

Champions

Singles
- (France) Arthur Rinderknech

Doubles
- (Croatia) Antonio Šančić / (Austria) Tristan-Samuel Weissborn
| ← 2019 · | Open de Rennes | · 2021 → |

The 2020 Open Blot Rennes was a professional tennis tournament played on hard courts. It was the fourteenth edition of the tournament and part of the 2020 ATP Challenger Tour. It took place in Rennes, France between 20 and 26 January 2020.

== Singles main-draw entrants ==
=== Seeds ===
| Country | Player | Rank^{1} | Seed |
|---|---|---|---|
| UKR | Sergiy Stakhovsky | 152 | 1 |
| GER | Oscar Otte | 163 | 2 |
| SRB | Danilo Petrović | 166 | 3 |
| SVK | Lukáš Lacko | 178 | 4 |
| FRA | Maxime Janvier | 201 | 5 |
| RUS | Alexey Vatutin | 207 | 6 |
| ESP | Bernabé Zapata Miralles | 210 | 7 |
| FRA | Tristan Lamasine | 214 | 8 |
| GER | Mats Moraing | 221 | 9 |
| FRA | Constant Lestienne | 224 | 10 |
| FRA | Alexandre Müller | 226 | 11 |
| ESP | Roberto Ortega Olmedo | 238 | 12 |
| GER | Tobias Kamke | 245 | 13 |
| RUS | Pavel Kotov | 247 | 14 |
| TUR | Cem İlkel | 264 | 15 |
| AUT | Lucas Miedler | 276 | 16 |

- ^{1} Rankings are as of 13 January 2020.

=== Other entrants ===
The following players received wildcards into the singles main draw:

- (France) Dan Added
- (France) Evan Furness
- (France) Kyrian Jacquet
- (Poland) Jerzy Janowicz
- (France) Valentin Royer

The following players received entry into the singles main draw as alternates:

- (Italy) Alessandro Bega
- (France) Antoine Escoffier
- (Finland) Patrik Niklas-Salminen

The following players received entry from the qualifying draw:

- (France) Corentin Denolly
- (Russia) Teymuraz Gabashvili

== Champions ==
=== Singles ===
- (France) Arthur Rinderknech def. (United Kingdom) James Ward 7–5, 6–4.

=== Doubles ===
- (Croatia) Antonio Šančić / (Austria) Tristan-Samuel Weissborn def. (Russia) Teymuraz Gabashvili / (Slovakia) Lukáš Lacko 7–5, 6–7^{(5–7)}, [10–7].
