= 2015 Open de Rennes =

- Date: 12–18 October
- Edition: 9th
- Surface: Hard
- Location: Rennes, France

Champions

Singles
- (Tunisia) Malek Jaziri

Doubles
- (Italy) Andrea Arnaboldi / (Croatia) Antonio Šančić
← 2014 ·	Open de Rennes	· 2017 →

The 2015 Open de Rennes was a professional tennis tournament played on hard courts. It was the tenth edition of the tournament which was part of the 2015 ATP Challenger Tour. It took place in Rennes, France between 12 and 18 October 2015.

== Singles main-draw entrants ==
=== Seeds ===
Country	Player	Rank^{1}	Seed
NED	Robin Haase	60	1
COL	Santiago Giraldo	65	2
BEL	Steve Darcis	66	3
TUN	Malek Jaziri	84	4
SRB	Filip Krajinović	87	5
TUR	Marsel İlhan	91	6
CRO	Ivan Dodig	109	7
UKR	Illya Marchenko	111	8

- ^{1} Rankings are as of October 5, 2015

=== Other entrants ===
The following players received wildcards into

- (France) Enzo Couacaud
- (France) Maxime Janvier
- (France) Alexandre Sidorenko
- (France) Maxime Teixeira

The following players entered the singles main draw as alternates:

- (France) Jonathan Eysseric
- (Ukraine) Artem Smirnov

The following players received entry from the qualifying draw:

- (Portugal) Romain Barbosa
- (Germany) Jeremy Jahn
- (France) Romain Jouan
- (United Kingdom) James Marsalek

The following player entered as a lucky loser:

- (France) Sebastien Boltz

== Champions ==
=== Singles ===
- (Tunisia) Malek Jaziri def. (Netherlands) Igor Sijsling, 5–7, 7–5, 6–4.

=== Doubles ===
- (Italy) Andrea Arnaboldi / (Germany) Antonio Šančić def. (Netherlands) Wesley Koolhof / (Netherlands) Matwé Middelkoop, 6–4, 2–6, [14–12]
