= 2019 Open de Rennes =

- Date: 21–27 January
- Edition: 13th
- Surface: Hard
- Location: Rennes, France

Champions

Singles
- (Lithuania) Ričardas Berankis

Doubles
- (Netherlands) Sander Arends / (Austria) Tristan-Samuel Weissborn
← 2018 ·	Open de Rennes	· 2020 →

The 2019 Open de Rennes was a professional tennis tournament played on hard courts. It was the thirteenth edition of the tournament and part of the 2019 ATP Challenger Tour. It took place in Rennes, France between 21 and 27 January 2019.

== Singles main-draw entrants ==
=== Seeds ===
Country	Player	Rank^{1}	Seed
FRA	Adrian Mannarino	42	1
FRA	Benoît Paire	61	2
CAN	Félix Auger-Aliassime	106	3
LTU	Ričardas Berankis	110	4
SWE	Elias Ymer	111	5
CYP	Marcos Baghdatis	122	6
GER	Yannick Maden	124	7
FRA	Quentin Halys	127	8
UKR	Sergiy Stakhovsky	132	9
~~ITA~~	~~Stefano Travaglia~~	~~137~~	~~10~~
AUT	Dennis Novak	141	11
FRA	Constant Lestienne	142	12
CZE	Lukáš Rosol	143	13
FRA	Antoine Hoang	147	14
FRA	Corentin Moutet	151	15
ITA	Salvatore Caruso	156	16

- ^{1} Rankings are as of 14 January 2019.

=== Other entrants ===
The following players received wildcards into the singles main draw:

- (France) Antoine Cornut-Chauvinc
- (France) Evan Furness
- (France) Hugo Gaston
- (France) Manuel Guinard
- (France) Adrian Mannarino

The following players received entry into the singles main draw as alternates:

- (Russia) Aslan Karatsev
- (Spain) Carlos Taberner

The following players received entry into the singles main draw using their ITF World Tennis Ranking:

- (Spain) Javier Barranco Cosano
- (Italy) Raúl Brancaccio
- (Bulgaria) Dimitar Kuzmanov
- (Italy) Roman Safiullin

The following players received entry from the qualifying draw:

- (France) Grégoire Jacq
- (France) Fabien Reboul

The following player received entry as a lucky loser:

- (Belgium) Yannick Mertens

== Champions ==
=== Singles ===
- (Lithuania) Ričardas Berankis def. (France) Antoine Hoang 6–4, 6–2.

=== Doubles ===
- (Netherlands) Sander Arends / (Austria) Tristan-Samuel Weissborn def. (Netherlands) David Pel / (Croatia) Antonio Šančić 6–4, 6–4.
