= 2018 Open de Rennes =

- Date: 22–28 January
- Edition: 12th
- Surface: Hard
- Location: Rennes, France

Champions

Singles
- (Canada) Vasek Pospisil

Doubles
- (Belgium) Sander Gillé / (Belgium) Joran Vliegen
← 2017 ·	Open de Rennes	· 2019 →

The 2018 Open de Rennes was a professional tennis tournament played on hard courts. It was the twelfth edition of the tournament and part of the 2018 ATP Challenger Tour, and it took place in Rennes, France between 22 and 28 January 2018.

== Singles main-draw entrants ==
=== Seeds ===
Country	Player	Rank^{1}	Seed
RUS	Mikhail Youzhny	90	1
CAN	Vasek Pospisil	105	2
POR	Gastão Elias	113	3
UKR	Sergiy Stakhovsky	120	4
GER	Dustin Brown	129	5
FRA	Quentin Halys	134	6
LTU	Ričardas Berankis	136	7
SVK	Norbert Gombos	137	8

- ^{1} Rankings are as of 15 January 2018.

=== Other entrants ===
The following players received wildcards into the singles main draw:

- (France) Manuel Guinard
- (Latvia) Ernests Gulbis
- (France) Ugo Humbert
- (France) Maxime Janvier

The following player received entry into the singles main draw as a special exempt:

- (Germany) Mats Moraing

The following player received entry into the singles main draw as an alternate:

- (Lithuania) Ričardas Berankis

The following players received entry from the qualifying draw:

- (France) Antoine Hoang
- (France) Tristan Lamasine
- (Japan) Yasutaka Uchiyama
- (Sweden) Mikael Ymer

== Champions ==
=== Singles ===
- (Canada) Vasek Pospisil def. (Lithuania) Ričardas Berankis 6–1, 6–2.

=== Doubles ===
- (Belgium) Sander Gillé / (Belgium) Joran Vliegen def. (Netherlands) Sander Arends / (Croatia) Antonio Šančić 6–3, 6–7^{(1–7)}, [10–7].
