= 2012 Open de Rennes =

- Date: 8–14 October
- Edition: 7th
- Surface: Hard
- Location: Rennes, France

Champions

Singles
- (France) Kenny de Schepper

Doubles
- (Germany) Philipp Marx / (Romania) Florin Mergea
← 2011 ·	Open de Rennes	· 2013 →

The 2012 Open de Rennes was a professional tennis tournament played on hard courts. It was the seventh edition of the tournament which was part of the 2012 ATP Challenger Tour. It took place in Rennes, France between 8 and 14 October 2012.

== Singles main-draw entrants ==
=== Seeds ===
Country	Player	Rank^{1}	Seed
SVN	Aljaž Bedene	90	1
AUT	Andreas Haider-Maurer	100	2
BEL	Ruben Bemelmans	108	3
BEL	Olivier Rochus	110	4
FRA	Michaël Llodra	111	5
GER	Matthias Bachinger	119	6
FRA	Florent Serra	120	7
FRA	~~Josselin Ouanna~~	122	8

- ^{1} Rankings are as of October 1, 2012.

=== Other entrants ===
The following players received wildcards into the singles main draw:

- (France) Grégoire Burquier
- (France) Marc Gicquel
- (France) Julien Obry
- (France) Maxime Teixeira

The following players received entry from the qualifying draw:

- (Lithuania) Laurynas Grigelis
- (Ukraine) Illya Marchenko
- (France) Fabrice Martin
- (Austria) Dominic Thiem

The following players received entry into the singles main draw as a lucky loser:

- (Austria) Martin Fischer

== Champions ==
=== Singles ===
- (France) Kenny de Schepper def. (Ukraine) Illya Marchenko, 6–3, 6–2

=== Doubles ===
- (Germany) Philipp Marx / (Romania) Florin Mergea def. (Poland) Tomasz Bednarek / (Poland) Mateusz Kowalczyk, 6–3, 6–2
