= 2026 Open de Rennes =

- Date: 14–20 September
- Edition: 20th
- Surface: Hard (indoor)
- Location: Rennes, France

Champions

Singles
- (France) Sascha Gueymard Wayenburg

Doubles
- (Netherlands) Sander Arends / (Netherlands) Bart Stevens
- Open de Rennes

The 2026 Open Blot Rennes was a professional tennis tournament played on indoor hard courts. It was the 20th edition of the tournament and part of the 2026 ATP Challenger Tour. It took place in Rennes, France between 14 and 20 September 2026.

== Singles main-draw entrants ==
=== Seeds ===
Country	Player	Rank^{1}	Seed
FRA	Adrian Mannarino	67	1
FRA	Titouan Droguet	103	2
FRA	Clément Tabur	159	3
GBR	Billy Harris	161	4
CRO	Borna Gojo	162	5
ITA	Francesco Maestrelli	168	6
AUS	Tristan Schoolkate	180	7
FRA	Clément Chidekh	185	8

- ^{1} Rankings are as of 31 August 2026.

=== Other entrants ===
The following players received wildcards into the singles main draw:

- (France) Mickael Kaouk
- (France) Arthur Nagel
- (France) Leo Raquillet

The following player received entry into the singles main draw as an alternate:

- (Czech Republic) Marek Gengel

The following players received entry from the qualifying draw:

- (United Kingdom) Finn Bass
- (France) Matisse Bobichon
- (France) Yanis Ghazouani Durand
- (France) Maxime Janvier
- (Germany) Daniel Masur
- (Germany) Max Schönhaus

== Champions ==
=== Singles ===
- (France) Sascha Gueymard Wayenburg def. (France) Harold Mayot 4–6, 6–3, 7–5.

=== Doubles ===
- (Netherlands) Sander Arends / (Netherlands) Bart Stevens def. Ivan Liutarevich / (United Kingdom) Joshua Paris 6–1, 6–1.
