= 2019 Open de Rennes – Singles =

Singles
- 2019 Open de Rennes

Final
- Champion: (Lithuania) Ričardas Berankis
- Runner-up: (France) Antoine Hoang
- Score: 6–4, 6–2

Events
Singles	Doubles
- Open de Rennes

Vasek Pospisil was the defending champion but chose not to defend his title.

Ričardas Berankis won the title after defeating Antoine Hoang 6–4, 6–2 in the final.

== Seeds ==
All seeds receive a bye into the second round.

1. (France) Adrian Mannarino (second round)
2. (France) Benoît Paire (quarterfinals, retired)
3. (Canada) Félix Auger-Aliassime (second round)
4. (Lithuania) Ričardas Berankis (champion)
5. (Sweden) Elias Ymer (quarterfinals)
6. (Cyprus) Marcos Baghdatis (quarterfinals)
7. (Germany) Yannick Maden (semifinals)
8. (France) Quentin Halys (quarterfinals)
9. (Ukraine) Sergiy Stakhovsky (third round)
10. (Italy) Stefano Travaglia (withdrew)
11. (Austria) Dennis Novak (second round)
12. (France) Constant Lestienne (second round)
13. (Czech Republic) Lukáš Rosol (third round)
14. (France) Antoine Hoang (final)
15. (France) Corentin Moutet (semifinals)
16. (Italy) Salvatore Caruso (third round)

== Draw ==
Key

- Q = Qualifier
- WC = Wild card
- LL = Lucky loser
- Alt = Alternate
- ITF = ITF entry
- PR = Protected ranking
- SR = Special ranking
- SE = Special exempt
- JE = Junior exempt
- JR = Junior Accelerator Programme entrant
- CO = College Accelerator Programme entrant
- NG = Next Gen Accelerator Program entrant
- w/o = Walkover
- r = Retired
- d = Defaulted

=== Finals ===
Quarterfinals
14	(France) Antoine Hoang	2	7^{7}	6
6	(Cyprus) Marcos Baghdatis	6	6^{5}	4
15	(France) Corentin Moutet	6	7
8	(France) Quentin Halys	4	5
5	(Sweden) Elias Ymer	4	4
4	(Lithuania) Ričardas Berankis	6	6
7	(Germany) Yannick Maden	6	2
2	(France) Benoît Paire	4	1^{r}

Semifinals
14	(France) Antoine Hoang	4	7^{7}	6
15	(France) Corentin Moutet	6	6^{4}	4
4	(Lithuania) Ričardas Berankis	6	6
7	(Germany) Yannick Maden	4	4

Final
14	(France) Antoine Hoang	4	2
4	(Lithuania) Ričardas Berankis	6	6

=== Top half ===
==== Section 1 ====
First round
(Netherlands) T de Bakker	6^{2}	6^{5}
(Austria) J Rodionov	7^{7}	7^{7}
ITF	(Spain) J Barranco Cosano	3	1
(Czech Republic) Z Kolář	6	6
WC	(France) E Furness	6	6
(Italy) F Baldi	4	4
(Slovakia) N Gombos	6	4	6
Alt	(Spain) C Taberner	0	6	1

Second round
1/WC	(France) A Mannarino	4	6	3
(Austria) J Rodionov	6	4	6
(Czech Republic) Z Kolář	3	4
14	(France) A Hoang	6	6
9	(Ukraine) S Stakhovsky	4	6	7^{9}
WC	(France) E Furness	6	3	6^{7}
(Slovakia) N Gombos	6	0	1
6	(Cyprus) M Baghdatis	4	6	6

Third round
(Austria) J Rodionov	6^{3}	6	4
14	(France) A Hoang	7^{7}	2	6
9	(Ukraine) S Stakhovsky	4	6^{2}
6	(Cyprus) M Baghdatis	6	7^{7}

Quarterfinals
14	(France) A Hoang	2	7^{7}	6
6	(Cyprus) M Baghdatis	6	6^{5}	4

==== Section 2 ====
First round
Alt	(Russia) A Karatsev	6	4
ITF	(Russia) R Safiullin	0	0^{r}
(Germany) M Moraing	6^{5}	0
(Germany) O Otte	7^{7}	6
Q	(France) G Jacq	5	0^{r}
ITF	(Italy) R Brancaccio	7	1
(Serbia) N Milojević	5	7	1
(Germany) D Masur	7	5	6

Second round
3	(Canada) F Auger-Aliassime	4	4
Alt	(Russia) A Karatsev	6	6
(Germany) O Otte	4	4
15	(France) C Moutet	6	6
11	(Austria) D Novak	2	6	6^{5}
ITF	(Italy) R Brancaccio	6	1	7^{7}
(Germany) D Masur	3	3
8	(France) Q Halys	6	6

Third round
Alt	(Russia) A Karatsev	2	3
15	(France) C Moutet	6	6
ITF	(Italy) R Brancaccio	7^{7}	4	4
8	(France) Q Halys	6^{4}	6	6

Quarterfinals
15	(France) C Moutet	6	7
8	(France) Q Halys	4	5

=== Bottom half ===
==== Section 3 ====
First round
Q	(France) F Reboul	7	6
(Spain) D Gimeno Traver	5	3
(Russia) E Karlovskiy	6	6
(Germany) R Molleker	4	2
(France) M Janvier	4	7^{7}	3
(Croatia) V Galović	6	6^{5}	6
WC	(France) M Guinard	3	6	6
ITF	(Bulgaria) D Kuzmanov	6	3	4

Second round
5	(Sweden) E Ymer	6	6
Q	(France) F Reboul	1	1
(Russia) E Karlovskiy	3	6^{2}
LL	(Belgium) Y Mertens	6	7^{7}
16	(Italy) S Caruso	4	6	6
(Croatia) V Galović	6	3	3
WC	(France) M Guinard	2	4
4	(Lithuania) R Berankis	6	6

Third round
5	(Sweden) E Ymer	6	6
LL	(Belgium) Y Mertens	3	4
16	(Italy) S Caruso	3	2
4	(Lithuania) R Berankis	6	6

Quarterfinals
5	(Sweden) E Ymer	4	4
4	(Lithuania) R Berankis	6	6

==== Section 4 ====
First round
(Kazakhstan) A Bublik	7	3	6
WC	(France) H Gaston	5	6	3
(Italy) A Arnaboldi	6	3	6
(Belarus) E Gerasimov	3	6	1
WC	(France) Antoine Cornut-Chauvinc	3	6^{1}
(France) G Barrère	6	7^{7}
(France) C Hemery	5	7^{11}	4
(United Kingdom) J Ward	7	6^{9}	6

Second round
7	(Germany) Y Maden	7^{7}	6
(Kazakhstan) A Bublik	6^{3}	1
(Italy) A Arnaboldi	4	7^{7}	6
12	(France) C Lestienne	6	6^{3}	3
13	(Czech Republic) L Rosol	3	7^{7}	6
(France) G Barrère	6	6^{5}	3
(United Kingdom) J Ward	2	6^{5}
2	(France) B Paire	6	7^{7}

Third round
7	(Germany) Y Maden	6	7^{7}
(Italy) A Arnaboldi	4	6^{2}
13	(Czech Republic) L Rosol	6^{4}	2
2	(France) B Paire	7^{7}	6

Quarterfinals
7	(Germany) Y Maden	6	2
2	(France) B Paire	4	1^{r}
