= Rabie Chaki =

Moroccan tennis player

- Full name: Abdel Mounim Rabie Chaki
- Country (sports): Morocco
- Born: 14 April 1982 (age 42); Tangier, Morocco
- Plays: Ambidextrous
- Prize money: $83,679

Singles
- Career record: 11–6 (ATP Tour & Davis Cup)
- Highest ranking: No. 338 (1 Feb 2010)

Doubles
- Career record: 4–6 (ATP Tour & Davis Cup)
- Highest ranking: No. 327 (21 Sep 2009)

Rabie Chaki (born 14 April 1982) is a Moroccan former professional tennis player.

Born in Tangier, Chaki was a France-based player and had a career best singles ranking of 338 in the world, winning eight ITF Futures titles. On the ATP Tour, he featured in the singles main draw at two editions of the Grand Prix Hassan II, including in 2009 when he troubled the top seed Igor Andreev in the first round, losing 5–7 in the third set.

Chaki played for the Morocco Davis Cup team between 2006 and 2010, appearing in a total of 13 ties. He had wins in 11 singles rubbers, which included victories over Malek Jaziri, Luka Gregorc, Frederik Nielsen and Dawid Olejniczak.

== ITF Futures titles ==
=== Singles: (8) ===
No.	Date	Tournament	Surface	Opponent	Score
1.	Jun 2006	Tunisia F3A, Carthage	Clay	(Egypt) Mohamed Mamoun	6–1, 6–2
2.	May 2007	Algeria F3, Algiers	Clay	(France) Éric Prodon	4–6, 6–4, 6–4
3.	Jun 2007	Tunisia F3, Carthage	Clay	(France) Romain Hardy	6–4, 5–7, 6–1
4.	Jun 2008	Tunisia F1, Sousse	Clay	(France) Nicolas Renavand	1–6, 6–4, 6–3
5.	Jun 2008	Morocco F5, Kenitra	Clay	(Spain) Cesar Ferrer-Victoria	5–7, 6–1, 6–4
6.	Aug 2008	Belgium F2, Koksijde	Clay	(Monaco) Clément Morel	6–4, 6–3
7.	Jun 2009	Morocco F4, Kenitra	Clay	(France) Clément Reix	6–3, 3–6, 6–3
8.	Oct 2009	France F20, Rodez	Hard	(France) Grégoire Burquier	6–4, 5–7, 7–6^{(7)}

=== Doubles: (8) ===
No.	Date	Tournament	Surface	Partner	Opponents	Score
1.	Jun 2006	Tunisia F2, Hammamet	Clay	(Greece) Alexandros Jakupovic	(France) Xavier Audouy (Germany) Peter Mayer-Tischer	6–3, 7–5
2.	Jun 2006	Tunisia F3, Djerba	Clay	(Morocco) Ali El Alaoui	(Nigeria) Candy Idoko (Senegal) Daouda Ndiaye	6–2, 6–4
3.	Jun 2007	Tunisia F2, Hammamet	Clay	(Egypt) Motaz Abou El Khair	(Australia) Evan Angelopoulos (Australia) Joshua Crowe	6–1, 6–7^{(1)}, 6–1
4.	Jun 2007	Tunisia F3, Carthage	Clay	(Egypt) Motaz Abou El Khair	(Tunisia) Haythem Abid (Tunisia) Walid Jallali	7–6^{(6)}, 6–3
5.	Mar 2008	Morocco F2, Rabat	Clay	(Morocco) Reda El Amrani	(Morocco) Mohamed Saber (Morocco) Mehdi Ziadi	6–3, 6–2
6.	Sep 2008	France F15, Plaisir	Hard	(Tunisia) Malek Jaziri	(Monaco) Thomas Oger (France) Alexandre Penaud	6–4, 7–6^{(2)}
7.	Oct 2008	France F19, La Roche-sur-Yon	Hard	(Georgia (country)) Lado Chikhladze	(Spain) Guillermo Alcaide (Russia) Nikolai Nesterov	6–2, 6–2
8.	Aug 2009	Belgium F2, Koksijde	Clay	(Belgium) Frederic de Fays	(United Kingdom) Alexander Ward (United Kingdom) Marcus Willis	6–3, 6–2

== See also ==
- List of Morocco Davis Cup team representatives
