= Open de Rennes =

Open Rennes
- 2025 Open de Rennes

ATP Challenger Tour
- Event name: Open Blot Rennes
- Location: Rennes, France
- Venue: Le Liberté
- Category: ATP Challenger Series, Challenger 100 (2023-)
- Surface: Hard (Indoor)
- Draw: 32S/32Q/16D
- Prize money: €145,250 (2025), €120,950 (2024)
- Website: www.openderennes.org

The Open Blot Rennes is a tennis tournament held in Rennes, France since 2006. The event is part of the ATP Challenger Tour and is played on indoor hardcourts.

== Past finals ==
=== Singles ===
Year	Champion	Runner-up	Score
2006	(France) Jo-Wilfried Tsonga	(Germany) Tobias Summerer	1–6, 7–5, 7–5
2007	(Germany) Philipp Petzschner	(Luxembourg) Gilles Müller	6–3, 6–4
2008	(France) Josselin Ouanna	(France) Adrian Mannarino	6–2, 6–3
2009	(Colombia) Alejandro Falla	(France) Thierry Ascione	6–3, 6–2
2010	(France) Marc Gicquel	(Switzerland) Stéphane Bohli	7–6^{(8–6)}, 4–6, 6–1
2011	(France) Julien Benneteau	(Belgium) Olivier Rochus	6–4, 6–3
2012	(France) Kenny de Schepper	(Ukraine) Illya Marchenko	7–6^{(7–4)}, 6–2
2013	(France) Nicolas Mahut	(France) Kenny de Schepper	6–3, 7–6^{(7–3)}
2014	(Belgium) Steve Darcis	(France) Nicolas Mahut	6–2, 6–4
2015	(Tunisia) Malek Jaziri	(Netherlands) Igor Sijsling	5–7, 7–5, 6–4
2016	Not Held		
2017	(Belarus) Uladzimir Ignatik	(Russia) Andrey Rublev	6–7^{(6–8)}, 6–3, 7–6^{(7–5)}
2018	(Canada) Vasek Pospisil	(Lithuania) Ričardas Berankis	6–1, 6–2
2019	(Lithuania) Ričardas Berankis	(France) Antoine Hoang	6–4, 6–2
2020	(France) Arthur Rinderknech	(United Kingdom) James Ward	7–5, 6–4
2021	(France) Benjamin Bonzi	(Germany) Mats Moraing	7–6^{(7–3)}, 7–6^{(7–3)}
2022	(France) Ugo Humbert	(Austria) Dominic Thiem	6–3, 6–0
2023	(United States) Maxime Cressy	(France) Benjamin Bonzi	6–3, 2–0 ret.
2024	(United Kingdom) Jacob Fearnley	(France) Quentin Halys	0–6, 7–6^{(7–5)}, 6–3
2025	(France) Hugo Gaston	(Switzerland) Stan Wawrinka	6–4, 6–4
2026	(France) Sascha Gueymard Wayenburg	(France) Harold Mayot	4–6, 6–3, 7–5

=== Doubles ===
Year	Champion	Runner-up	Score
2006	(France) Grégory Carraz (France) Mathieu Montcourt	(Poland) Tomasz Bednarek (Germany) Frank Moser	6–3, 3–6, [10–4]
2007	(Germany) Philipp Petzschner (Germany) Björn Phau	(Slovakia) Filip Polášek (Slovakia) Igor Zelenay	6–2, 6–2
2008	(United Kingdom) James Auckland (Belgium) Dick Norman	(Switzerland) Yves Allegro (Romania) Horia Tecău	6–3, 6–4
2009	(United States) Eric Butorac (Croatia) Lovro Zovko	(South Africa) Kevin Anderson (Slovakia) Dominik Hrbatý	6–4, 3–6, [10–6]
2010	(United States) Scott Lipsky (United States) David Martin	(Germany) Denis Gremelmayr (Germany) Björn Phau	6–4, 5–7, [12–10]
2011	(Germany) Martin Emmrich (Sweden) Andreas Siljeström	(France) Kenny de Schepper (France) Édouard Roger-Vasselin	6–4, 6–4
2012	(Germany) Philipp Marx (Romania) Florin Mergea	(Poland) Tomasz Bednarek (Poland) Mateusz Kowalczyk	6–3, 6–2
2013	(Austria) Oliver Marach (Romania) Florin Mergea (2)	(United States) Nicholas Monroe (Germany) Simon Stadler	6–4, 3–6, [10–7]
2014	(Germany) Tobias Kamke (Germany) Philipp Marx (2)	(Czech Republic) František Čermák (Israel) Jonathan Erlich	3–6, 6–2, [10–3]
2015	(Italy) Andrea Arnaboldi (Croatia) Antonio Šančić	(Netherlands) Wesley Koolhof (Netherlands) Matwé Middelkoop	6–4, 2–6, [14–12]
2016	Not Held		
2017	(Russia) Evgeny Donskoy (Russia) Mikhail Elgin	(Austria) Julian Knowle (United Kingdom) Jonathan Marray	6–4, 3–6, [11–9]
2018	(Belgium) Sander Gillé (Belgium) Joran Vliegen	(Netherlands) Sander Arends (Croatia) Antonio Šančić	6–3, 6–7^{(1–7)}, [10–7]
2019	(Netherlands) Sander Arends (Austria) Tristan-Samuel Weissborn	(Netherlands) David Pel (Croatia) Antonio Šančić	6–4, 6–4
2020	(Croatia) Antonio Šančić (Austria) Tristan-Samuel Weissborn	(Russia) Teymuraz Gabashvili (Slovakia) Lukáš Lacko	7–5, 6–7^{(5–7)}, [10–7]
2021	(Netherlands) Bart Stevens (Netherlands) Tim van Rijthoven	(Czech Republic) Marek Gengel (Czech Republic) Tomáš Macháč	6–7^{(2–7)}, 7–5, [10–3]
2022	(France) Jonathan Eysseric (Netherlands) David Pel	(France) Dan Added (France) Albano Olivetti	6–4, 6–4
2023	(Netherlands) Sander Arends (Netherlands) David Pel	(France) Antoine Escoffier (India) Niki Kaliyanda Poonacha	6–3, 6–2
2024	(Netherlands) Sander Arends (France) Grégoire Jacq	(France) Antoine Escoffier (United Kingdom) Joshua Paris	6–4, 6–2
2025	(Finland) Patrik Niklas-Salminen (Czech Republic) Matěj Vocel	(Germany) Hendrik Jebens (France) Albano Olivetti	6–3, 6–3
2026	(Netherlands) Sander Arends (Netherlands) Bart Stevens	Ivan Liutarevich (United Kingdom) Joshua Paris	6–1, 6–1
