= 2025 Open Nouvelle-Calédonie – Doubles =

Doubles
- 2025 Open Nouvelle-Calédonie

Final
- Champions: (Australia) Blake Bayldon (Northern Mariana Islands) Colin Sinclair
- Runners-up: (Japan) Ryuki Matsuda (Japan) Ryotaro Taguchi
- Score: 6–3, 7–5

Events
Singles	Doubles
- Open Nouvelle-Calédonie

Colin Sinclair and Rubin Statham were the defending champions but only Sinclair chose to defend his title, partnering Blake Bayldon. Sinclair successfully defended his title after defeating Ryuki Matsuda and Ryotaro Taguchi 6–3, 7–5 in the final.

== Seeds ==
1. (France) Théo Arribagé / (Portugal) Francisco Cabral (semifinals)
2. (Australia) Jake Delaney / (Australia) Jesse Delaney (quarterfinals)
3. (Australia) Blake Bayldon / (Northern Mariana Islands) Colin Sinclair (champions)
4. (Australia) Matt Hulme / (Netherlands) Thijmen Loof (first round)

== Draw ==
Key

- Q = Qualifier
- WC = Wild card
- LL = Lucky loser
- Alt = Alternate
- ITF = ITF entry
- PR = Protected ranking
- SR = Special ranking
- SE = Special exempt
- JE = Junior exempt
- JR = Junior Accelerator Programme entrant
- CO = College Accelerator Programme entrant
- NG = Next Gen Accelerator Program entrant
- w/o = Walkover
- r = Retired
- d = Defaulted

=== Draw ===
First round
(Japan) Kosuke Ogura (Japan) Keisuke Saitoh	7^{7}	6
(Japan) S Hazawa (Japan) T Ichikawa	6^{4}	3
3	(Australia) B Bayldon (Northern Mariana Islands) C Sinclair	6	7^{7}
(Japan) S Mochizuki (Paraguay) AD Vallejo	4	6^{5}
(Australia) Adrian Arcon (France) Gillian Osmont	3	2
WC	(France) Liam Branger (France) Heremana Courte	6	6
WC	(France) B Paire (France) Jalane Salaün-Ouillemon	4	3
(Australia) M Bouzige (United States) Andre Ilagan	6	6
(France) E Couacaud (Netherlands) J de Jong	6^{7}	6	[10]
4	(Australia) M Hulme (Netherlands) T Loof	7^{9}	4	[8]
(Japan) Ryuki Matsuda (Japan) Ryotaro Taguchi	6	7
(France) M Janvier (Australia) A Taylor	4	5

Quarterfinals
1	(France) T Arribagé (Portugal) F Cabral	4	7	[10]
(Japan) K Ogura (Japan) K Saitoh	6	5	[6]
3	(Australia) B Bayldon (Northern Mariana Islands) C Sinclair	6	6
WC	(France) L Branger (France) H Courte	3	4
(Australia) M Bouzige (United States) A Ilagan	7	5	[2]
(France) E Couacaud (Netherlands) J de Jong	5	7	[10]
(Japan) R Matsuda (Japan) R Taguchi	6	7^{7}
2	(Australia) Ja Delaney (Australia) Je Delaney	2	6^{4}

Semifinals
1	(France) T Arribagé (Portugal) F Cabral	6	4	[6]
3	(Australia) B Bayldon (Northern Mariana Islands) C Sinclair	4	6	[10]
(France) E Couacaud (Netherlands) J de Jong
(Japan) R Matsuda (Japan) R Taguchi	w/o

Final
3	(Australia) B Bayldon (Northern Mariana Islands) C Sinclair	6	7
(Japan) R Matsuda (Japan) R Taguchi	3	5
