= 2025 Open Nouvelle-Calédonie – Singles =

Singles
- 2025 Open Nouvelle-Calédonie

Final
- Champion: (Japan) Shintaro Mochizuki
- Runner-up: (Australia) Moerani Bouzige
- Score: 6–1, 6–3

Events
Singles	Doubles
- Open Nouvelle-Calédonie

Arthur Cazaux was the defending champion but chose not to defend his title.

Shintaro Mochizuki won the title after defeating Moerani Bouzige 6–1, 6–3 in the final.

== Seeds ==
1. (France) Adrian Mannarino (first round)
2. (Hungary) Márton Fucsovics (quarterfinals)
3. (Netherlands) Jesper de Jong (first round)
4. (Monaco) Valentin Vacherot (quarterfinals)
5. (Denmark) Elmer Møller (first round)
6. (Austria) Jurij Rodionov (semifinals)
7. (Netherlands) Gijs Brouwer (second round)
8. (France) Constant Lestienne (semifinals)

== Draw ==
Key

- Q = Qualifier
- WC = Wild card
- LL = Lucky loser
- Alt = Alternate
- ITF = ITF entry
- PR = Protected ranking
- SR = Special ranking
- SE = Special exempt
- JE = Junior exempt
- JR = Junior Accelerator Programme entrant
- CO = College Accelerator Programme entrant
- NG = Next Gen Accelerator Program entrant
- w/o = Walkover
- r = Retired
- d = Defaulted

=== Finals ===
Semifinals
6	(Austria) Jurij Rodionov	3	3
(Japan) Shintaro Mochizuki	6	6
8	(France) Constant Lestienne	7^{7}	3	4
(Australia) Moerani Bouzige	6^{3}	6	6

Final
(Japan) Shintaro Mochizuki	6	6
(Australia) Moerani Bouzige	1	3

=== Top half ===
First round
1	(France) A Mannarino	3	0
(Japan) Y Takahashi	6	6
(New Zealand) K Pannu	6	4	1
(France) E Couacaud	4	6	6
WC	(France) B Paire	6^{4}	6	7
(Northern Mariana Islands) C Sinclair	7^{7}	1	5
Q	(Australia) B Bayldon	4	2
6	(Austria) J Rodionov	6	6
3	(Netherlands) J de Jong	4	6^{5}
(United States) Andre Ilagan	6	7^{7}
(Japan) Keisuke Saitoh	4	4
(Japan) S Mochizuki	6	6
(Japan) T Ichikawa	6	2	6
Q	(France) Liam Branger	4	6	2
(Australia) B Tomic	4	1
7	(Netherlands) G Brouwer	6	6

Second round
(Japan) Y Takahashi	3	4
(France) E Couacaud	6	6
WC	(France) B Paire	4	7	2
6	(Austria) J Rodionov	6	5	6
(United States) A Ilagan	7^{7}	4	2
(Japan) S Mochizuki	6^{5}	6	6
(Japan) T Ichikawa	6	6
7	(Netherlands) G Brouwer	1	4

Quarterfinals
(France) E Couacaud	6	4	2
6	(Austria) J Rodionov	4	6	6
(Japan) S Mochizuki	6	6
(Japan) T Ichikawa	3	3

Semifinals
6	(Austria) J Rodionov	3	3
(Japan) S Mochizuki	6	6

=== Bottom half ===
First round
8	(France) C Lestienne	6	6
Q	(Australia) Ja Delaney	3	3
WC	(France) Heremana Courte	1	2
(Denmark) A Holmgren	6	6
(Japan) Ryotaro Taguchi	6	6
(Paraguay) AD Vallejo	3	4
Q	(Japan) S Hazawa	3	4
4	(Monaco) V Vacherot	6	6
5	(Denmark) E Møller	6	3	3
(Australia) M Bouzige	4	6	6
WC	(France) Charlie Camus	6	6
Q	(Japan) Kosuke Ogura	2	1
(France) M Janvier	6	6
(Japan) Ryuki Matsuda	3	3
Q	(Portugal) F Cabral	2	3
2	(Hungary) M Fucsovics	6	6

Second round
8	(France) C Lestienne	5	6	7^{7}
(Denmark) A Holmgren	7	2	6^{1}
(Japan) R Taguchi	1	2
4	(Monaco) V Vacherot	6	6
(Australia) M Bouzige	7	6
WC	(France) C Camus	5	3
(France) M Janvier	4	6	3
2	(Hungary) M Fucsovics	6	3	6

Quarterfinals
8	(France) C Lestienne	6	4	7
4	(Monaco) V Vacherot	2	6	5
(Australia) M Bouzige	6	6
2	(Hungary) M Fucsovics	3	3

Semifinals
8	(France) C Lestienne	7^{7}	3	4
(Australia) M Bouzige	6^{3}	6	6
