= 2024 Nottingham Open – Men's doubles =

Men's doubles
- 2024 Nottingham Open

Final
- Champions: (Australia) John Peers (United Kingdom) Marcus Willis
- Runners-up: (France) Harold Mayot (Australia) Luke Saville
- Score: 6–1, 6–7^{(1–7)}, [10–7]

Events
Singles	men	women
Doubles	men	women
← 2023 ·	Nottingham Open	· 2025 →

John Peers and Marcus Willis defeated Harold Mayot and Luke Saville in the final, 6–1, 6–7^{(1–7)}, [10–7], to win the men's doubles title at the 2024 Nottingham Open.

Jacob Fearnley and Johannus Monday were the defending champions, but only Fearnley chose to defend his title, partnering with Cameron Norrie. They lost in the first round to Rithvik Choudary Bollipalli and Niki Kaliyanda Poonacha.

== Seeds ==
1. (Australia) John Peers / (United Kingdom) Marcus Willis (champions)
2. (Sweden) André Göransson / (Netherlands) Sem Verbeek (semifinals)
3. (India) Anirudh Chandrasekar / (India) Arjun Kadhe (first round)
4. (India) Rithvik Choudary Bollipalli / (India) Niki Kaliyanda Poonacha (quarterfinals)

== Draw ==
=== Key ===
- Q = Qualifier
- WC = Wild card
- LL = Lucky loser
- Alt = Alternate
- ITF = ITF entry
- PR = Protected ranking
- SR = Special ranking
- SE = Special exempt
- JE = Junior exempt
- JR = Junior Accelerator Programme entrant
- CO = College Accelerator Programme entrant
- NG = Next Gen Accelerator Program entrant
- w/o = Walkover
- r = Retired
- d = Defaulted

=== Draw ===
First round
1	(Australia) J Peers (United Kingdom) M Willis	6	6
(Chile) T Barrios Vera (United States) P Kypson	2	3
(Australia) B Ellis (United Kingdom) J Paris	4	7^{7}	[4]
WC	(United Kingdom) A McHugh (United Kingdom) J Pinnington Jones	6	6^{2}	[10]
3	(India) A Chandrasekar (India) A Kadhe	5	6^{5}
(Canada) G Diallo (United States) E Nava	7	7^{7}
(Croatia) D Ajduković (Bosnia and Herzegovina) D Džumhur	3	6	[10]
(United States) C Harrison (France) F Martin	6	3	[7]
(France) H Mayot (Australia) L Saville	6	2	[10]
(Switzerland) L Riedi (Switzerland) D Stricker	2	6	[8]
(United Kingdom) J Fearnley (United Kingdom) C Norrie	6^{1}	4
4	(India) RC Bollipalli (India) N Kaliyanda Poonacha	7^{7}	6
(India) J Nedunchezhiyan (India) VS Prashanth	6	3	[7]
WC	(United Kingdom) C Broom (United Kingdom) B Jones	3	6	[10]
(Chinese Taipei) R Ho (Australia) C Puttergill	2	3
2	(Sweden) A Göransson (Netherlands) S Verbeek	6	6

Quarterfinals
1	(Australia) J Peers (United Kingdom) M Willis	w/o
WC	(United Kingdom) A McHugh (United Kingdom) J Pinnington Jones
(Canada) G Diallo (United States) E Nava
(Croatia) D Ajduković (Bosnia and Herzegovina) D Džumhur	w/o
(France) H Mayot (Australia) L Saville	6	7^{7}
4	(India) RC Bollipalli (India) N Kaliyanda Poonacha	1	6^{2}
WC	(United Kingdom) C Broom (United Kingdom) B Jones	3	3
2	(Sweden) A Göransson (Netherlands) S Verbeek	6	6

Semifinals
1	(Australia) J Peers (United Kingdom) M Willis	w/o
(Croatia) D Ajduković (Bosnia and Herzegovina) D Džumhur
(France) H Mayot (Australia) L Saville	6	6
2	(Sweden) A Göransson (Netherlands) S Verbeek	3	3

Final
1	(Australia) J Peers (United Kingdom) M Willis	6	6^{1}	[10]
(France) H Mayot (Australia) L Saville	1	7^{7}	[7]
