= 2025 Nottingham Open =

- Date: 15–22 June
- Edition: 10th (women); 29th (men)
- Category: WTA 250 (women); ATP Challenger Tour 125 (men)
- Draw: 32S / 16D (women); 32S / 16D (men)
- Surface: Grass
- Location: Nottingham, United Kingdom
- Venue: Nottingham Tennis Centre

Champions

Men's singles
- (Croatia) Marin Čilić

Women's singles
- (United States) McCartney Kessler

Men's doubles
- (Mexico) Santiago González / (United States) Austin Krajicek

Women's doubles
- (Brazil) Beatriz Haddad Maia / (Germany) Laura Siegemund
← 2024 ·	Nottingham Open	· 2026 →

The 2025 Nottingham Open (also known as the Lexus Nottingham Open for sponsorship purposes) was a professional tennis tournament played on outdoor grass courts. It was the 10th edition of the event for women and the 29th edition for men. It was classified as a WTA 250 tournament on the 2025 WTA Tour for the women and as a 2025 ATP Challenger Tour event for the men. The event took place at the Nottingham Tennis Centre in Nottingham, United Kingdom from 15 to 22 June 2025.

== Champions ==
=== Men's singles ===
- (Croatia) Marin Čilić def. (Japan) Shintaro Mochizuki 6–2, 6–3.

=== Women's singles ===
- (United States) McCartney Kessler def. (Ukraine) Dayana Yastremska, 6–4, 7–5

=== Men's doubles ===
- (Mexico) Santiago González / (United States) Austin Krajicek def. (Brazil) Fernando Romboli / (Australia) John-Patrick Smith 7–6^{(7–2)}, 6–4.

=== Women's doubles ===
- (Brazil) Beatriz Haddad Maia / (Germany) Laura Siegemund def. (Kazakhstan) Anna Danilina / (Japan) Ena Shibahara, 6–3, 6–2

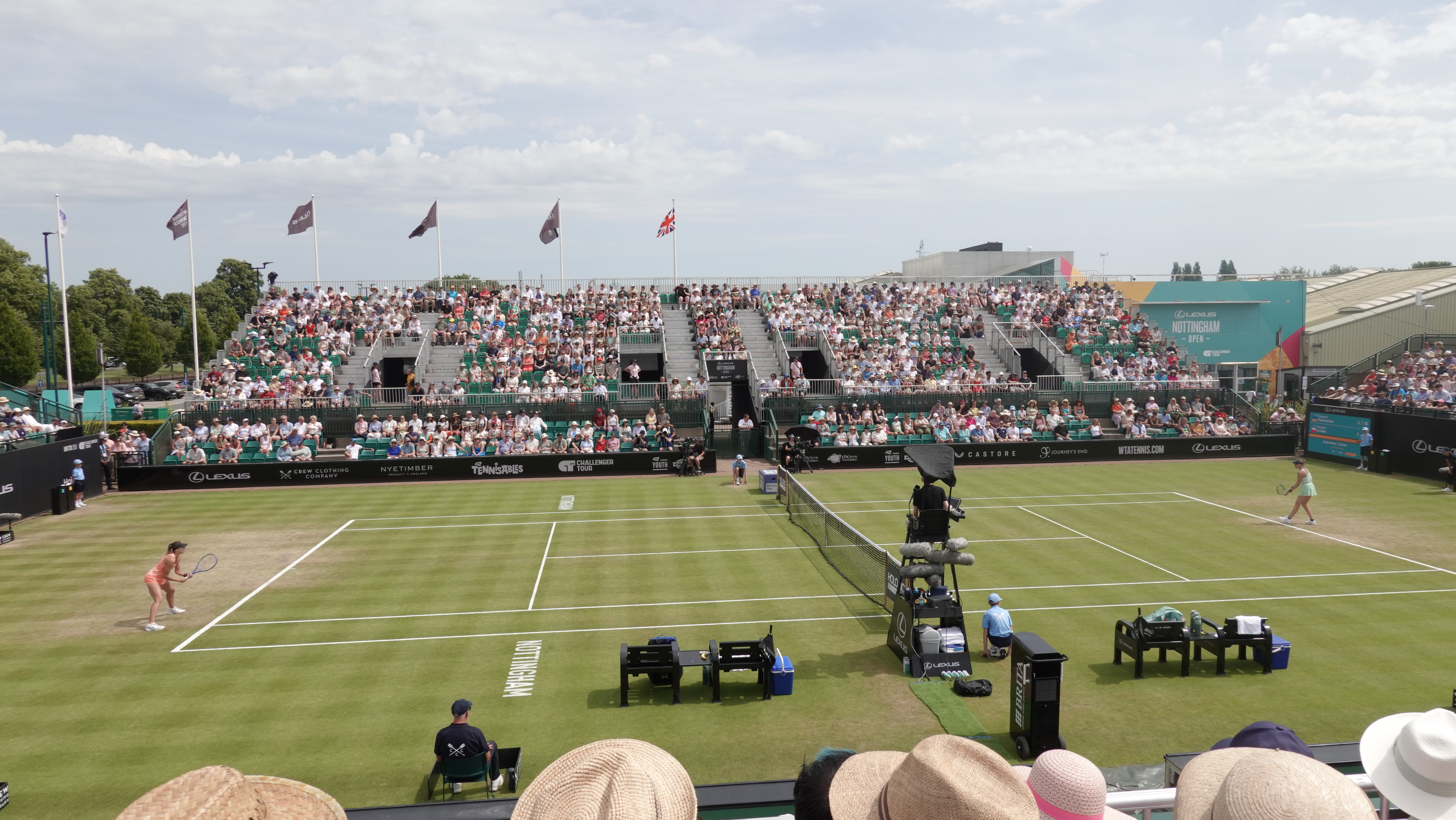
Women's singles semifinal match between Dayana Yastremska and Magda Linette.

== ATP singles main-draw entrants ==
=== Seeds ===
Country	Player	Rank^{1}	Seed
~~ITA~~	~~Luca Nardi~~	~~98~~	~~1~~
CRO	Marin Čilić	104	2
USA	Brandon Holt	106	3
~~USA~~	~~Christopher Eubanks~~	~~107~~	~~4~~
COL	Daniel Elahi Galán	110	5
CHI	Tomás Barrios Vera	111	6
FRA	Arthur Cazaux	113	7
USA	Tristan Boyer	115	8

- ^{1} Rankings are as of 9 June 2025.

=== Other entrants ===
The following players received wildcards into the main draw:

- (United Kingdom) George Loffhagen
- (United Kingdom) Ryan Peniston
- (United Kingdom) Jack Pinnington Jones

The following player received entry into the singles main draw using a protected ranking:

- (South Africa) Lloyd Harris

The following players received entry into the singles main draw as special exempts:

- (Japan) Shintaro Mochizuki
- (Argentina) Marco Trungelliti

The following player received entry into the singles main draw through the Next Gen Accelerator programme:

- (Norway) Nicolai Budkov Kjær

The following players received entry from the qualifying draw:

- (United Kingdom) Jan Choinski
- (United Kingdom) Arthur Fery
- (Italy) Matteo Gigante
- (France) Hugo Grenier
- (Australia) James McCabe
- (Japan) James Trotter

The following players received entry as lucky losers:

- (United States) Colton Smith
- (United States) Eliot Spizzirri

== WTA singles main-draw entrants ==
=== Seeds ===
Country	Player	Rank^{1}	Seed
BRA	Beatriz Haddad Maia	22	1
DEN	Clara Tauson	23	2
~~BEL~~	~~Elise Mertens~~	~~25~~	~~3~~
KAZ	Yulia Putintseva	27	4
CAN	Leylah Fernandez	30	5
POL	Magda Linette	31	6
CZE	Linda Nosková	32	7
GBR	Katie Boulter	34	8
SRB	Olga Danilović	38	9

- ^{1} Rankings are as of 9 June 2025.

=== Other entrants ===
The following players received wildcards into the main draw:

- (United Kingdom) Harriet Dart
- (United Kingdom) Francesca Jones
- (United Kingdom) Hannah Klugman
- (United Kingdom) Mingge Xu

The following players received entry using a protected ranking:

- ~~(Czech Republic) Petra Kvitová~~
- (China) Zhu Lin

The following player received entry as a special exempt:

- ~~(Germany) Tatjana Maria~~

The following players received entry from the qualifying draw:

- (Philippines) Alexandra Eala
- (France) Léolia Jeanjean
- Kamilla Rakhimova
- (Croatia) Antonia Ružić
- Aliaksandra Sasnovich
- (Germany) Laura Siegemund

The following players received entry as lucky losers:

- (Spain) Cristina Bucșa
- (Ukraine) Yuliia Starodubtseva
- (Romania) Anca Todoni

=== Withdrawals ===
- (Armenia) Elina Avanesyan → replaced by (Australia) Kimberly Birrell
- Polina Kudermetova → replaced by (Netherlands) Suzan Lamens
- (Czech Republic) Petra Kvitová → replaced by (Ukraine) Yuliia Starodubtseva
- (Germany) Tatjana Maria → replaced by (Spain) Cristina Bucșa
- (Belgium) Elise Mertens → replaced by (Romania) Anca Todoni
- (United States) Alycia Parks → replaced by Anna Blinkova
- Anastasia Pavlyuchenkova → replaced by (United States) Katie Volynets

== WTA doubles main-draw entrants ==
=== Seeds ===
Country	Player	Country	Player	Rank^{1}	Seed
TPE	Hsieh Su-wei	CHN	Zhang Shuai	27	1
	Irina Khromacheva	HUN	Fanny Stollár	64	2
BRA	Beatriz Haddad Maia	GER	Laura Siegemund	64	3
KAZ	Anna Danilina	JPN	Ena Shibahara	68	4

- ^{1} Rankings are as of 9 June 2025.

=== Other entrants ===
The following pairs received wildcards into the doubles main draw:

- (United Kingdom) Jodie Burrage / (United Kingdom) Sonay Kartal
- (United Kingdom) Hannah Klugman / (United Kingdom) Mika Stojsavljevic
