= 2024 Nottingham Open – Men's singles =

Men's singles
- 2024 Nottingham Open

Final
- Champion: (United Kingdom) Jacob Fearnley
- Runner-up: (United Kingdom) Charles Broom
- Score: 4–6, 6–4, 6–3

Details
- Draw: 32
- Seeds: 8

Events
Singles	men	women
Doubles	men	women
- Nottingham Open

Jacob Fearnley defeated Charles Broom in the final, 4–6, 6–4, 6–3, to win the men's singles title at the 2024 Nottingham Open.

Andy Murray was the defending champion, but chose to compete in Stuttgart instead.

== Seeds ==
1. (United Kingdom) Cameron Norrie (second round)
2. (United Kingdom) Dan Evans (quarterfinals)
3. (China) Shang Juncheng (quarterfinals)
4. (France) Harold Mayot (second round)
5. (United States) Emilio Nava (second round)
6. (Bosnia and Herzegovina) Damir Džumhur (first round)
7. (Croatia) Duje Ajduković (first round)
8. (South Africa) Lloyd Harris (second round)

== Draw ==
Key

- Q = Qualifier
- WC = Wild card
- LL = Lucky loser
- Alt = Alternate
- ITF = ITF entry
- PR = Protected ranking
- SR = Special ranking
- SE = Special exempt
- JE = Junior exempt
- JR = Junior Accelerator Programme entrant
- CO = College Accelerator Programme entrant
- NG = Next Gen Accelerator Program entrant
- w/o = Walkover
- r = Retired
- d = Defaulted

=== Finals ===
Semifinals
(Italy) Mattia Bellucci	3	1
Q	(United Kingdom) Jacob Fearnley	6	6
Alt	(United Kingdom) Billy Harris	4	4
Q	(United Kingdom) Charles Broom	6	6

Final
Q	(United Kingdom) Jacob Fearnley	4	6	6
Q	(United Kingdom) Charles Broom	6	4	3

=== Top half ===
First round
1/WC	(United Kingdom) C Norrie	6	4	6
Q	(Japan) S Shimabukuro	1	6	3
Q	(United Kingdom) J Pinnington Jones	4	7	6
WC	(United Kingdom) A Fery	6	5	3
(Canada) G Diallo	4	6	5
(Italy) M Bellucci	6	4	7
(Switzerland) L Riedi	7^{8}	4	3
5	(United States) E Nava	6^{6}	6	6
3	(China) J Shang	6	4	6
(Chile) T Barrios Vera	0	6	3
Q	(Australia) A Bolt	7^{14}	7
(United Kingdom) J Choinski	6^{12}	5
Alt	(China) Y Bu	2	5
Q	(United Kingdom) J Fearnley	6	7
WC	(United Kingdom) P Jubb	7^{7}	6
7	(Croatia) D Ajduković	6^{1}	4

Second round
1/WC	(United Kingdom) C Norrie	6	4	4
Q	(United Kingdom) J Pinnington Jones	1	6	6
(Italy) M Bellucci	6	6
5	(United States) E Nava	4	4
3	(China) J Shang	6	6
Q	(Australia) A Bolt	4	3
Q	(United Kingdom) J Fearnley	6	6^{14}	6
WC	(United Kingdom) P Jubb	1	7^{16}	3

Quarterfinals
Q	(United Kingdom) J Pinnington Jones	4	6^{0}
(Italy) M Bellucci	6	7^{7}
3	(China) J Shang	5	5
Q	(United Kingdom) J Fearnley	7	7

Semifinals
(Italy) M Bellucci	3	1
Q	(United Kingdom) J Fearnley	6	6

=== Bottom half ===
First round
6	(Bosnia and Herzegovina) D Džumhur	1	5
(Brazil) J Fonseca	6	7
Alt	(United Kingdom) B Harris	6	6
(Hong Kong) C Wong	3	4
(United States) P Kypson	7^{7}	5	6^{3}
(Kazakhstan) M Kukushkin	6^{3}	7	7^{7}
Alt	(Australia) M Polmans	4	3
4	(France) H Mayot	6	6
8	(South Africa) L Harris	4	7^{7}	6
(Kazakhstan) B Zhukayev	6	6^{4}	4
(Japan) S Mochizuki	7^{11}	4	2
Q	(United Kingdom) C Broom	6^{9}	6	6
(United States) D Kudla	6^{4}	4
Q	(United Kingdom) H Searle	7^{7}	6
(Switzerland) D Stricker	3	6	3
2	(United Kingdom) D Evans	6	4	6

Second round
(Brazil) J Fonseca	6^{5}	6	4
Alt	(United Kingdom) B Harris	7^{7}	3	6
(Kazakhstan) M Kukushkin	7^{7}	6
4	(France) H Mayot	6^{3}	3
8	(South Africa) L Harris	6^{2}	6	4
Q	(United Kingdom) C Broom	7^{7}	2	6
Q	(United Kingdom) H Searle	6^{4}	6^{5}
2	(United Kingdom) D Evans	7^{7}	7^{7}

Quarterfinals
Alt	(United Kingdom) B Harris	6	2
(Kazakhstan) M Kukushkin	1	1^{r}
Q	(United Kingdom) C Broom	3	6	6
2	(United Kingdom) D Evans	6	3	2

Semifinals
Alt	(United Kingdom) B Harris	4	4
Q	(United Kingdom) C Broom	6	6
