= 2024 Open Nouvelle-Calédonie =

- Date: 1–6 January
- Edition: 19th
- Surface: Hard
- Location: Nouméa, New Caledonia

Champions

Singles
- (France) Arthur Cazaux

Doubles
- (Northern Mariana Islands) Colin Sinclair / (New Zealand) Rubin Statham
- Open Nouvelle-Calédonie

The 2024 Open SIFA Nouvelle-Calédonie was a professional tennis tournament played on hard courts. It was the 19th edition of the tournament which was part of the 2024 ATP Challenger Tour. It took place in Nouméa, New Caledonia between 1 and 6 January 2024.

== Singles main-draw entrants ==
=== Seeds ===
Country	Player	Rank^{1}	Seed
FRA	Richard Gasquet	76	1
FRA	Constant Lestienne	87	2
FRA	Hugo Gaston	104	3
FRA	Benoît Paire	117	4
FRA	Arthur Cazaux	130	5
AUS	Marc Polmans	150	6
USA	Nicolas Moreno de Alboran	152	7
NED	Jesper de Jong	153	8

- ^{1} Rankings are as of 25 December 2023.

=== Other entrants ===
The following players received wildcards into the singles main draw:

- (France) Maxime Chazal
- (France) Jules Marie
- (Northern Mariana Islands) Colin Sinclair

The following players received entry from the qualifying draw:

- (Australia) Moerani Bouzige
- (Australia) Jesse Delaney
- (Japan) Hiroki Moriya
- (Australia) Blake Mott
- (Japan) Makoto Ochi
- (New Zealand) Rubin Statham

The following player received entry as a lucky loser:

- (Australia) Thomas Fancutt

== Champions ==
=== Singles ===
- (France) Arthur Cazaux def. (France) Enzo Couacaud 6–1, 6–1.

=== Doubles ===
- (Northern Mariana Islands) Colin Sinclair / (New Zealand) Rubin Statham def. (Japan) Toshihide Matsui / (Australia) Calum Puttergill 7–5, 6–2.
