= 2025 Nottingham Open – Men's singles =

Men's singles
- 2025 Nottingham Open

Final
- Champion: (Croatia) Marin Čilić
- Runner-up: (Japan) Shintaro Mochizuki
- Score: 6–2, 6–3

Details
- Draw: 32
- Seeds: 8

Events
Singles	men	women
Doubles	men	women
- Nottingham Open

Jacob Fearnley was the defending champion but chose not to defend his title.

Marin Čilić won the title after defeating Shintaro Mochizuki 6–2, 6–3 in the final. At 36 years and eight months old, Čilić became the oldest grass court champion in Challenger history. Mochizuki was the first Japanese finalist at the tournament.

== Seeds ==
1. (Italy) Luca Nardi (withdrew)
2. (Croatia) Marin Čilić (champion)
3. (United States) Brandon Holt (first round)
4. (United States) Christopher Eubanks (withdrew)
5. (Colombia) Daniel Elahi Galán (first round)
6. (Chile) Tomás Barrios Vera (quarterfinals)
7. (France) Arthur Cazaux (first round)
8. (United States) Tristan Boyer (second round)

== Draw ==
Key

- Q = Qualifier
- WC = Wild card
- LL = Lucky loser
- Alt = Alternate
- ITF = ITF entry
- PR = Protected ranking
- SR = Special ranking
- SE = Special exempt
- JE = Junior exempt
- JR = Junior Accelerator Programme entrant
- CO = College Accelerator Programme entrant
- NG = Next Gen Accelerator Program entrant
- w/o = Walkover
- r = Retired
- d = Defaulted

=== Finals ===
Semifinals
LL	(United States) Colton Smith	2	2
SE	(Japan) Shintaro Mochizuki	6	6
(Spain) Martín Landaluce	7^{8}	4	6^{7}
2	(Croatia) Marin Čilić	6^{6}	6	7^{9}

Final
SE	(Japan) Shintaro Mochizuki	2	3
2	(Croatia) Marin Čilić	6	6

=== Top half ===
First round
Q	(Australia) J McCabe	6	7^{7}
WC	(United Kingdom) G Loffhagen	3	6^{4}
SE	(Argentina) M Trungelliti	2	6	3
LL	(United States) C Smith	6	4	6
WC	(United Kingdom) J Pinnington Jones	3	7^{12}	3
(United States) E Nava	6	6^{10}	6
WC	(United Kingdom) R Peniston	5	6	6
5	(Colombia) DE Galán	7	4	2
3	(United States) B Holt	3	4
(Portugal) J Faria	6	6
LL	(United States) E Spizzirri	7	4	4
Q	(United Kingdom) J Choinski	5	6	6
(France) P-H Herbert	4	6^{7}
SE	(Japan) S Mochizuki	6	7^{9}
(United States) M Krueger	1	5
8	(United States) T Boyer	6	7

Second round
Q	(Australia) J McCabe	7	3	3
LL	(United States) C Smith	5	6	6
(United States) E Nava	7^{7}	6
WC	(United Kingdom) R Peniston	6^{5}	4
(Portugal) J Faria	7	6
Q	(United Kingdom) J Choinski	5	3
SE	(Japan) S Mochizuki	6	6
8	(United States) T Boyer	2	3

Quarterfinals
LL	(United States) C Smith	6^{5}	6	6
(United States) E Nava	7^{7}	4	4
(Portugal) J Faria	2	0
SE	(Japan) S Mochizuki	6	6

Semifinals
LL	(United States) C Smith	2	2
SE	(Japan) S Mochizuki	6	6

=== Bottom half ===
First round
7	(France) A Cazaux	4	3
(France) A Mannarino	6	6
(Spain) M Landaluce	6	2	6
NG	(Norway) N Budkov Kjær	2	6	2
(France) T Atmane	4	6	6
Q	(Italy) M Gigante	6	4	4
(Italy) F Fognini	3	6^{5}
Q	(United Kingdom) A Fery	6	7^{7}
6	(Chile) T Barrios Vera	6	6
Q	(Japan) J Trotter	3	4
(Australia) T Schoolkate	6	6
(Belgium) A Blockx	3	2
PR	(South Africa) L Harris	7^{8}	6
(France) V Royer	6^{6}	2
Q	(France) H Grenier	3	2
2	(Croatia) M Čilić	6	6

Second round
(France) A Mannarino	6	5	5
(Spain) M Landaluce	4	7	7
(France) T Atmane	5	6	6
Q	(United Kingdom) A Fery	7	3	4
6	(Chile) T Barrios Vera	6	7^{10}
(Australia) T Schoolkate	2	6^{8}
PR	(South Africa) L Harris	6	4	1^{r}
2	(Croatia) M Čilić	2	6	3

Quarterfinals
(Spain) M Landaluce	6^{3}	6	6
(France) T Atmane	7^{7}	2	3
6	(Chile) T Barrios Vera	1	3
2	(Croatia) M Čilić	6	6

Semifinals
(Spain) M Landaluce	7^{8}	4	6^{7}
2	(Croatia) M Čilić	6^{6}	6	7^{9}
