= 2024 Open Nouvelle-Calédonie – Doubles =

Doubles
- 2024 Open Nouvelle-Calédonie

Final
- Champions: (Northern Mariana Islands) Colin Sinclair (New Zealand) Rubin Statham
- Runners-up: (Japan) Toshihide Matsui (Australia) Calum Puttergill
- Score: 7–5, 6–2

Events
Singles	Doubles
- Open Nouvelle-Calédonie

Colin Sinclair and Rubin Statham were the defending champions and successfully defended their title, defeating Toshihide Matsui and Calum Puttergill 7–5, 6–2 in the final.

== Seeds ==
1. (Japan) Toshihide Matsui / (Australia) Calum Puttergill (final)
2. (Northern Mariana Islands) Colin Sinclair / (New Zealand) Rubin Statham (champions)
3. (Australia) Blake Bayldon / (Australia) Adam Taylor (first round)
4. (Australia) Thomas Fancutt / (New Zealand) Ajeet Rai (semifinals)

== Draw ==
Key

- Q = Qualifier
- WC = Wild card
- LL = Lucky loser
- Alt = Alternate
- ITF = ITF entry
- PR = Protected ranking
- SR = Special ranking
- SE = Special exempt
- JE = Junior exempt
- JR = Junior Accelerator Programme entrant
- CO = College Accelerator Programme entrant
- NG = Next Gen Accelerator Program entrant
- w/o = Walkover
- r = Retired
- d = Defaulted

First round
1	(Japan) T Matsui (Australia) C Puttergill	4	6	[10]
(France) G Blancaneaux (France) C Hemery	6	3	[5]
(France) U Blanchet (France) K Jacquet	3	7^{7}	[9]
(France) E Couacaud (France) H Mayot	6	6^{4}	[11]
3	(Australia) B Bayldon (Australia) A Taylor	6	3	[8]
WC	(France) M Chazal (France) Gillian Osmont	2	6	[10]
WC	(France) Louam Boivin (France) Charlie Camus	w/o
(Italy) R Brancaccio (United States) N Moreno de Alboran
(Netherlands) G Brouwer (Netherlands) J de Jong	7^{7}	6
(Australia) Ja Delaney (Australia) M Polmans	6^{4}	3
(France) H Grenier (France) B Paire	6^{4}	3
4	(Australia) T Fancutt (New Zealand) A Rai	7^{7}	6
(Australia) M Bouzige (Australia) B Mott	7^{7}	6
(Japan) M Imamura (Japan) Makoto Ochi	6^{3}	4
Alt	(Australia) Je Delaney (France) T Setodji	6^{0}	2
2	(Northern Mariana Islands) C Sinclair (New Zealand) R Statham	7^{7}	6

Quarterfinals
1	(Japan) T Matsui (Australia) C Puttergill	w/o
(France) E Couacaud (France) H Mayot
WC	(France) M Chazal (France) G Osmont	6	6
WC	(France) L Boivin (France) C Camus	1	0
(Netherlands) G Brouwer (Netherlands) J de Jong	4	6	[7]
4	(Australia) T Fancutt (New Zealand) A Rai	6	1	[10]
(Australia) M Bouzige (Australia) B Mott	6^{0}	3
2	(Northern Mariana Islands) C Sinclair (New Zealand) R Statham	7^{7}	6

Semifinals
1	(Japan) T Matsui (Australia) C Puttergill	6	6
WC	(France) M Chazal (France) G Osmont	2	4
4	(Australia) T Fancutt (New Zealand) A Rai	3	6	[3]
2	(Northern Mariana Islands) C Sinclair (New Zealand) R Statham	6	3	[10]

Final
1	(Japan) T Matsui (Australia) C Puttergill	5	2
2	(Northern Mariana Islands) C Sinclair (New Zealand) R Statham	7	6
