= 2024 Nottingham Open – Women's singles =

Women's singles
- 2024 Nottingham Open

Final
- Champion: (United Kingdom) Katie Boulter
- Runner-up: (Czech Republic) Karolína Plíšková
- Score: 4–6, 6–3, 6–2

Details
- Draw: 32 (6 Q / 4 WC )
- Seeds: 8

Events
Singles	men	women
Doubles	men	women
← 2023 ·	Nottingham Open	· 2025 →

Defending champion Katie Boulter defeated Karolína Plíšková in the final, 4–6, 6–3, 6–2 to win the women's singles tennis title at the 2024 Nottingham Open. Boulter became the first woman in the tournament's history to defend the title, and became the second player to win the tournament twice, after Elena Baltacha.

== Seeds ==
1. (Tunisia) Ons Jabeur (quarterfinals)
2. (Ukraine) Marta Kostyuk (first round)
3. (United Kingdom) Katie Boulter (champion)
4. (France) Clara Burel (first round)
5. (Poland) Magdalena Fręch (quarterfinals)
6. (Czech Republic) Karolína Plíšková (final)
7. (China) Zhu Lin (first round)
8. (United States) Caroline Dolehide (first round)

== Draw ==
=== Key ===
- Q = Qualifier
- WC = Wild card
- LL = Lucky loser
- Alt = Alternate
- ITF = ITF entry
- PR = Protected ranking
- SR = Special ranking
- SE = Special exempt
- JE = Junior exempt
- JR = Junior Accelerator Programme entrant
- CO = College Accelerator Programme entrant
- NG = Next Gen Accelerator Program entrant
- w/o = Walkover
- r = Retired
- d = Defaulted

=== Finals ===
Semifinals
6	(Czech Republic) Karolína Plíšková	6^{9}	6	6
(France) Diane Parry	7^{11}	1	4
3	(United Kingdom) Katie Boulter	6^{13}	6	6
WC	(United Kingdom) Emma Raducanu	7^{15}	3	4

Final
6	(Czech Republic) Karolína Plíšková	6	3	2
3	(United Kingdom) Katie Boulter	4	6	6

=== Top half ===
First round
1	(Tunisia) O Jabeur	6	6
(Colombia) C Osorio	2	3
(United Kingdom) L Miyazaki	4	5
Q	(Czech Republic) L Fruhvirtová	6	7
WC	(United Kingdom) H Watson	4	6	6
(United States) K Day	6	0	4
(United States) A Parks	4	4
6	(Czech Republic) Ka Plíšková	6	6
4	(France) C Burel	3	3
(Australia) D Saville	6	6
(Spain) C Bucșa	3	2
(France) D Parry	6	6
Q	(United Kingdom) E Appleton	3	5
Q	(Australia) K Birrell	6	7
Q	(Italy) L Stefanini	7^{7}	3	7
7	(China) L Zhu	6^{4}	6	5

Second round
1	(Tunisia) O Jabeur	6	6
Q	(Czech Republic) L Fruhvirtová	2	1
WC	(United Kingdom) H Watson	4	4
6	(Czech Republic) Ka Plíšková	6	6
(Australia) D Saville	4	1
(France) D Parry	6	6
Q	(Australia) K Birrell	6	6^{5}	6
Q	(Italy) L Stefanini	4	7^{7}	0

Quarterfinals
1	(Tunisia) O Jabeur	6^{8}	7^{7}	5
6	(Czech Republic) Ka Plíšková	7^{10}	6^{3}	7
(France) D Parry	6	7^{7}
Q	(Australia) K Birrell	3	6^{4}

Semifinals
6	(Czech Republic) Ka Plíšková	6^{9}	6	6
(France) D Parry	7^{11}	1	4

=== Bottom half ===
First round
5	(Poland) M Fręch	6	6
(Japan) N Hibino	1	4
(Germany) T Maria	4	7^{9}	7^{8}
(Colombia) E Arango	6	6^{7}	6^{6}
(Switzerland) V Golubic	1	4
Q	(Canada) R Marino	6	6
(United Kingdom) H Dart	7^{7}	4	5
3	(United Kingdom) K Boulter	6^{5}	6	7
8	(United States) C Dolehide	6^{3}	3
WC	(United Kingdom) F Jones	7^{7}	6
(United States) A Krueger	6	6
(China) Y Wang	3	3
Q	(Japan) E Shibahara	1	4
WC	(United Kingdom) E Raducanu	6	6
(Ukraine) D Snigur	6	6
2/WC	(Ukraine) M Kostyuk	3	3

Second round
5	(Poland) M Fręch	3	6	6
(Germany) T Maria	6	3	1
Q	(Canada) R Marino	4	3
3	(United Kingdom) K Boulter	6	6
WC	(United Kingdom) F Jones	6	4	7
(United States) A Krueger	4	6	5
WC	(United Kingdom) E Raducanu	6	6
(Ukraine) D Snigur	2	2

Quarterfinals
5	(Poland) M Fręch	2	4
3	(United Kingdom) K Boulter	6	6
WC	(United Kingdom) F Jones
WC	(United Kingdom) E Raducanu	w/o

Semifinals
3	(United Kingdom) K Boulter	6^{13}	6	6
WC	(United Kingdom) E Raducanu	7^{15}	3	4

== Qualifying ==
=== Seeds ===
1. (Czech Republic) Linda Fruhvirtová (qualified)
2. (Philippines) Alexandra Eala (qualifying competition)
3. (Canada) Rebecca Marino (qualified)
4. (Australia) Kimberly Birrell (qualified)
5. (Italy) Lucrezia Stefanini (qualified)
6. (Poland) Katarzyna Kawa (first round)
7. (Australia) Talia Gibson (qualifying competition)
8. (Australia) Destanee Aiava (qualifying competition)
9. (China) Ma Yexin (fiirst round)
10. (Canada) Carol Zhao (first round)
11. (Australia) Maddison Inglis (first round)
12. (United Kingdom) Sonay Kartal (qualifying competition)

=== Qualifiers ===
1. (Czech Republic) Linda Fruhvirtová
2. (Japan) Ena Shibahara
3. (Canada) Rebecca Marino
4. (Australia) Kimberly Birrell
5. (Italy) Lucrezia Stefanini
6. (United Kingdom) Emily Appleton

=== Qualifying draw ===
==== First qualifier ====
First round
1	(Czech Republic) Linda Fruhvirtová	6	4	7
WC	(United Kingdom) Amelia Rajecki	1	6	5
(United Kingdom) Samantha Murray Sharan	3	6	7
10	(Canada) Carol Zhao	7	4	5

Qualifying competition
1	(Czech Republic) Linda Fruhvirtová	7^{7}	6^{3}	6
(United Kingdom) Samantha Murray Sharan	6^{3}	7^{7}	3

==== Second qualifier ====
First round
2	(Philippines) Alexandra Eala	6	6
WC	(United Kingdom) Sarah Beth Grey	3	4
(Japan) Ena Shibahara	7^{7}	6
11	(Australia) Maddison Inglis	6^{1}	2

Qualifying competition
2	(Philippines) Alexandra Eala	7^{7}	0	2
(Japan) Ena Shibahara	6^{5}	6	6

==== Third qualifier ====
First round
3	(Canada) Rebecca Marino	6	6
Vitalia Diatchenko	3	1
(United Kingdom) Katy Dunne	1	1
12/WC	(United Kingdom) Sonay Kartal	6	6

Qualifying competition
3	(Canada) Rebecca Marino	7	6
12/WC	(United Kingdom) Sonay Kartal	5	2

==== Fourth qualifier ====
First round
4	(Australia) Kimberly Birrell	6	6
(Kazakhstan) Zarina Diyas	1	0
(United States) Jamie Loeb	3	4
8	(Australia) Destanee Aiava	6	6

Qualifying competition
4	(Australia) Kimberly Birrell	6	6
8	(Australia) Destanee Aiava	2	2

==== Fifth qualifier ====
First round
5	(Italy) Lucrezia Stefanini	6	2	6
(United Kingdom) Amarni Banks	4	6	4
(Sweden) Mirjam Björklund	5	2
7	(Australia) Talia Gibson	7	6

Qualifying competition
5	(Italy) Lucrezia Stefanini	6	6
7	(Australia) Talia Gibson	4	1

==== Sixth qualifier ====
First round
6	(Poland) Katarzyna Kawa	3	3
WC	(United Kingdom) Naiktha Bains	6	6
(United Kingdom) Emily Appleton	7^{8}	6
9	(China) Ma Yexin	6^{6}	0

Qualifying competition
WC	(United Kingdom) Naiktha Bains	6	2	2
(United Kingdom) Emily Appleton	4	6	6
