= 2024 Open Nouvelle-Calédonie – Singles =

Singles
- 2024 Open Nouvelle-Calédonie

Final
- Champion: (France) Arthur Cazaux
- Runner-up: (France) Enzo Couacaud
- Score: 6–1, 6–1

Events
Singles	Doubles
- Open Nouvelle-Calédonie

Raúl Brancaccio was the defending champion but lost in the first round to Titouan Droguet.

Arthur Cazaux won the title after defeating Enzo Couacaud 6–1, 6–1 in the final.

== Seeds ==
1. (France) Richard Gasquet (quarterfinals)
2. (France) Constant Lestienne (second round)
3. (France) Hugo Gaston (quarterfinals)
4. (France) Benoît Paire (quarterfinals)
5. (France) Arthur Cazaux (champion)
6. (Australia) Marc Polmans (first round)
7. (United States) Nicolas Moreno de Alboran (second round)
8. (Netherlands) Jesper de Jong (quarterfinals)

== Draw ==
Key

- Q = Qualifier
- WC = Wild card
- LL = Lucky loser
- Alt = Alternate
- ITF = ITF entry
- PR = Protected ranking
- SR = Special ranking
- SE = Special exempt
- JE = Junior exempt
- JR = Junior Accelerator Programme entrant
- CO = College Accelerator Programme entrant
- NG = Next Gen Accelerator Program entrant
- w/o = Walkover
- r = Retired
- d = Defaulted

=== Finals ===
Semifinals
(Netherlands) Gijs Brouwer	6	6^{6}	4
(France) Enzo Couacaud	3	7^{8}	6
5	(France) Arthur Cazaux	7^{7}	7^{7}
(France) Harold Mayot	6^{5}	6^{4}

Final
(France) Enzo Couacaud	1	1
5	(France) Arthur Cazaux	6	6

=== Top half ===
First round
1	(France) R Gasquet	7^{7}	6
(Ukraine) I Marchenko	6^{5}	2
(Bulgaria) D Kuzmanov	6^{4}	6	6^{3}
(France) G Mpetshi Perricard	7^{7}	3	7^{7}
(Netherlands) G Brouwer	6	7
LL	(Australia) T Fancutt	3	5
(France) C Hemery	5	7^{7}	4
7	(United States) N Moreno de Alboran	7	6^{4}	6
3	(France) H Gaston	6^{1}	7	7^{7}
WC	(France) M Chazal	7^{7}	5	6^{4}
Q	(Japan) Makoto Ochi	1	2
(France) K Jacquet	6	6
(France) H Grenier	6	3	6^{2}
Q	(Australia) M Bouzige	4	6	7^{7}
(France) E Couacaud	6	6
6	(Australia) M Polmans	1	2

Second round
1	(France) R Gasquet	6	7^{7}
(France) G Mpetshi Perricard	2	6^{3}
(Netherlands) G Brouwer	5	7	6
7	(United States) N Moreno de Alboran	7	5	2
3	(France) H Gaston	6	6
(France) K Jacquet	2	4
Q	(Australia) M Bouzige	3	6^{3}
(France) E Couacaud	6	7^{7}

Quarterfinals
1	(France) R Gasquet	6	2	5
(Netherlands) G Brouwer	4	6	7
3	(France) H Gaston	7^{7}	4	0
(France) E Couacaud	6^{4}	6	6

Semifinals
(Netherlands) G Brouwer	6	6^{6}	4
(France) E Couacaud	3	7^{8}	6

=== Bottom half ===
First round
5	(France) A Cazaux	6	3	6
WC	(France) Jules Marie	1	6	3
(United States) P Kypson	6	7
Q	(Australia) B Mott	3	5
Q	(New Zealand) R Statham	7^{7}	4	4
WC	(Northern Mariana Islands) C Sinclair	6^{2}	6	6
(France) G Blancaneaux	5	6	3
4	(France) B Paire	7	3	6
8	(Netherlands) J de Jong	6	7
Q	(Australia) Je Delaney	1	5
(Italy) R Brancaccio	3	6	4
(France) T Droguet	6	0	6
(France) H Mayot	6	6
(France) U Blanchet	2	0
Q	(Japan) H Moriya	1	0
2	(France) C Lestienne	6	6

Second round
5	(France) A Cazaux	3	7^{9}	6
(United States) P Kypson	6	6^{7}	2
WC	(Northern Mariana Islands) C Sinclair	6	2	2
4	(France) B Paire	4	6	6
8	(Netherlands) J de Jong	6	6
(France) T Droguet	0	0
(France) H Mayot	6	6
2	(France) C Lestienne	4	3

Quarterfinals
5	(France) A Cazaux	6	6
4	(France) B Paire	2	1
8	(Netherlands) J de Jong	6	5	4
(France) H Mayot	3	7	6

Semifinals
5	(France) A Cazaux	7^{7}	7^{7}
(France) H Mayot	6^{5}	6^{4}
