= 2025 Open Nouvelle-Calédonie =

- Date: 30 December 2024 – 4 January 2025
- Edition: 20th
- Surface: Hard
- Location: Nouméa, New Caledonia

Champions

Singles
- (Japan) Shintaro Mochizuki

Doubles
- (Australia) Blake Bayldon / (Northern Mariana Islands) Colin Sinclair
- Open Nouvelle-Calédonie

The 2025 BNC Tennis Open was a professional tennis tournament played on hardcourts. It was the 20th edition of the tournament which was part of the 2025 ATP Challenger Tour. It took place in Nouméa, New Caledonia between 30 December 2024 and 4 January 2025.

== Singles main-draw entrants ==
=== Seeds ===
Country	Player	Rank^{1}	Seed
FRA	Adrian Mannarino	66	1
HUN	Márton Fucsovics	104	2
NED	Jesper de Jong	112	3
MON	Valentin Vacherot	140	4
DEN	Elmer Møller	160	5
AUT	Jurij Rodionov	175	6
NED	Gijs Brouwer	177	7
FRA	Constant Lestienne	188	8

- ^{1} Rankings are as of 23 December 2024.

=== Other entrants ===
The following players received wildcards into the singles main draw:

- (France) Charlie Camus
- (France) Heremana Courte
- (France) Benoît Paire

The following players received entry from the qualifying draw:

- (Australia) Blake Bayldon
- (France) Liam Branger
- (Portugal) Francisco Cabral
- (Australia) Jake Delaney
- (Japan) Shinji Hazawa
- (Japan) Kosuke Ogura

== Champions ==
=== Singles ===
- (Japan) Shintaro Mochizuki def. (Australia) Moerani Bouzige 6–1, 6–3.

=== Doubles ===
- (Australia) Blake Bayldon / (Northern Mariana Islands) Colin Sinclair def. (Japan) Ryuki Matsuda / (Japan) Ryotaro Taguchi 6–3, 7–5.
