= 2023 Nottingham Open – Men's doubles =

Men's doubles
- 2023 Nottingham Open

Final
- Champions: (United Kingdom) Jacob Fearnley (United Kingdom) Johannus Monday
- Runners-up: (United Kingdom) Liam Broady (United Kingdom) Jonny O'Mara
- Score: 6–3, 6–7^{(6–8)}, [10–7]

Events
Singles	men	women
Doubles	men	women
- Nottingham Open

Jacob Fearnley and Johannus Monday won the title after defeating Liam Broady and Jonny O'Mara 6–3, 6–7^{(6–8)}, [10–7] in the final of the 2023 Nottingham Open men's doubles tournament.

O'Mara and Ken Skupski were the defending champions but only O'Mara chose to defend his title, partnering Broady.

== Seeds ==
1. (Sweden) André Göransson / (Japan) Ben McLachlan (first round)
2. (India) Yuki Bhambri / (India) Saketh Myneni (quarterfinals)
3. (United States) Robert Galloway / (Australia) John-Patrick Smith (semifinals)
4. (United Kingdom) Julian Cash / (United Kingdom) Luke Johnson (quarterfinals)

== Draw ==
Key

- Q = Qualifier
- WC = Wild card
- LL = Lucky loser
- Alt = Alternate
- ITF = ITF entry
- PR = Protected ranking
- SR = Special ranking
- SE = Special exempt
- JE = Junior exempt
- JR = Junior Accelerator Programme entrant
- CO = College Accelerator Programme entrant
- NG = Next Gen Accelerator Program entrant
- w/o = Walkover
- r = Retired
- d = Defaulted

First round
1	(Sweden) A Göransson (Japan) B McLachlan	4	6^{3}
WC	(United Kingdom) J Fearnley (United Kingdom) J Monday	6	7^{7}
Alt	(France) A Cazaux (France) L Lokoli	6^{5}	3
(India) A Chandrasekar (India) VS Prashanth	7^{7}	6
3	(United States) R Galloway (Australia) J-P Smith	6	6
(France) E Couacaud (Australia) A Harris	0	3
(France) T Arribagé (France) L Sanchez	6^{6}	7	[10]
(Portugal) N Borges (United States) A Kovacevic	7^{8}	5	[2]
(India) P Raja (India) D Sharan	3	2
WC	(United Kingdom) T Samuel (United Kingdom) C Thomson	6	6
Alt	(Italy) M Bellucci (China) Y Bu	6^{2}	6^{2}
4	(United Kingdom) J Cash (United Kingdom) L Johnson	7^{7}	7^{7}
(United Kingdom) L Broady (United Kingdom) J O'Mara	6	6
(India) S Balaji (Pakistan) A-u-H Qureshi	4	4
(Chinese Taipei) Y-h Hsu (Australia) L Saville	7^{8}	1	[5]
2	(India) Y Bhambri (India) S Myneni	6^{6}	6	[10]

Quarterfinals
WC	(United Kingdom) J Fearnley (United Kingdom) J Monday	7^{7}	6
(India) A Chandrasekar (India) VS Prashanth	6^{4}	3
3	(United States) R Galloway (Australia) J-P Smith	7^{7}	7^{14}
(France) T Arribagé (France) L Sanchez	6^{3}	6^{12}
WC	(United Kingdom) T Samuel (United Kingdom) C Thomson	6	6^{8}	[10]
4	(United Kingdom) J Cash (United Kingdom) L Johnson	3	7^{10}	[8]
(United Kingdom) L Broady (United Kingdom) J O'Mara	6	6
2	(India) Y Bhambri (India) S Myneni	1	4

Semifinals
WC	(United Kingdom) J Fearnley (United Kingdom) J Monday	2	6	[10]
3	(United States) R Galloway (Australia) J-P Smith	6	4	[8]
WC	(United Kingdom) T Samuel (United Kingdom) C Thomson	7^{11}	5	[3]
(United Kingdom) L Broady (United Kingdom) J O'Mara	6^{9}	7	[10]

Final
WC	(United Kingdom) J Fearnley (United Kingdom) J Monday	6	6^{6}	[10]
(United Kingdom) L Broady (United Kingdom) J O'Mara	3	7^{8}	[7]
