= 2025 Nottingham Open – Men's doubles =

Men's doubles
- 2025 Nottingham Open

Final
- Champions: (Mexico) Santiago González (United States) Austin Krajicek
- Runners-up: (Brazil) Fernando Romboli (Australia) John-Patrick Smith
- Score: 7–6^{(7–2)}, 6–4

Events
Singles	men	women
Doubles	men	women
← 2024 ·	Nottingham Open	· 2026 →

John Peers and Marcus Willis were the defending champions but chose not to defend their title.

Santiago González and Austin Krajicek won the title after defeating Fernando Romboli and John-Patrick Smith 7–6^{(7–2)}, 6–4 in the final.

== Seeds ==
1. (Argentina) Guido Andreozzi / (France) Théo Arribagé (semifinals)
2. (Mexico) Santiago González / (United States) Austin Krajicek (champions)
3. (Brazil) Fernando Romboli / (Australia) John-Patrick Smith (final)
4. (Uruguay) Ariel Behar / (Belgium) Joran Vliegen (first round)

== Draw ==
=== Key ===
- Q = Qualifier
- WC = Wild card
- LL = Lucky loser
- Alt = Alternate
- ITF = ITF entry
- PR = Protected ranking
- SR = Special ranking
- SE = Special exempt
- JE = Junior exempt
- JR = Junior Accelerator Programme entrant
- CO = College Accelerator Programme entrant
- NG = Next Gen Accelerator Program entrant
- w/o = Walkover
- r = Retired
- d = Defaulted

=== Draw ===
First round
1	(Argentina) G Andreozzi (France) T Arribagé	6	6
WC	(United Kingdom) Oliver Bonding (United Kingdom) R Peniston	2	3
(Germany) J Schnaitter (Germany) M Wallner	6	7
WC	(United Kingdom) L Maxted (United Kingdom) C Thomson	4	5
3	(Brazil) F Romboli (Australia) J-P Smith	6	7^{7}
(United States) R Cash (United States) JJ Tracy	2	6^{5}
(Brazil) O Luz (Mexico) M Reyes-Varela	6^{4}	5
(United Kingdom) J Paris (Japan) T Yuzuki	7^{7}	7
(Colombia) N Barrientos (India) RC Bollipalli	6	6
(Australia) B Bayldon (United States) R Stalder	3	4
(Ecuador) D Hidalgo (United States) P Trhac	6	6
4	(Uruguay) A Behar (Belgium) J Vliegen	4	4
(Germany) H Jebens (France) A Olivetti	4	6	[11]
Alt	(Portugal) J Faria (India) J Nedunchezhiyan	6	1	[13]
(Canada) C Harper (United States) E Spizzirri	3	3
2	(Mexico) S González (United States) A Krajicek	6	6

Quarterfinals
1	(Argentina) G Andreozzi (France) T Arribagé	6^{5}	6	[12]
(Germany) J Schnaitter (Germany) M Wallner	7^{7}	4	[10]
3	(Brazil) F Romboli (Australia) J-P Smith	7^{7}	6
(United Kingdom) J Paris (Japan) T Yuzuki	6^{4}	2
(Colombia) N Barrientos (India) RC Bollipalli	6^{9}	7^{7}	[5]
(Ecuador) D Hidalgo (United States) P Trhac	7^{11}	6^{5}	[10]
Alt	(Portugal) J Faria (India) J Nedunchezhiyan	6^{5}	2
2	(Mexico) S González (United States) A Krajicek	7^{7}	6

Semifinals
1	(Argentina) G Andreozzi (France) T Arribagé	4	6^{8}
3	(Brazil) F Romboli (Australia) J-P Smith	6	7^{10}
(Ecuador) D Hidalgo (United States) P Trhac	7^{8}	6^{2}	[6]
2	(Mexico) S González (United States) A Krajicek	6^{6}	7^{7}	[10]

Final
3	(Brazil) F Romboli (Australia) J-P Smith	6^{2}	4
2	(Mexico) S González (United States) A Krajicek	7^{7}	6
