= 2023 Nottingham Open – Men's singles =

Men's singles
- 2023 Nottingham Open

Final
- Champion: (United Kingdom) Andy Murray
- Runner-up: (France) Arthur Cazaux
- Score: 6–4, 6–4

Details
- Draw: 32
- Seeds: 8

Events
Singles	men	women
Doubles	men	women
- Nottingham Open

Andy Murray won the title of the men's singles tennis tournament at the 2023 Nottingham Open, defeating Arthur Cazaux 6–4, 6–4 in the final.

Dan Evans was the defending champion but chose not to defend his title.

== Seeds ==
1. (United Kingdom) Andy Murray (champion)
2. (France) Constant Lestienne (first round)
3. (Portugal) Nuno Borges (semifinals)
4. (Australia) Aleksandar Vukic (first round)
5. (Germany) Dominik Koepfer (semifinals)
6. (Australia) Thanasi Kokkinakis (first round)
7. (United States) Aleksandar Kovacevic (first round)
8. (Switzerland) Dominic Stricker (quarterfinals)

== Draw ==
Key

- Q = Qualifier
- WC = Wild card
- LL = Lucky loser
- Alt = Alternate
- ITF = ITF entry
- PR = Protected ranking
- SR = Special ranking
- SE = Special exempt
- JE = Junior exempt
- JR = Junior Accelerator Programme entrant
- CO = College Accelerator Programme entrant
- NG = Next Gen Accelerator Program entrant
- w/o = Walkover
- r = Retired
- d = Defaulted

=== Finals ===
Semifinals
1/WC	(United Kingdom) Andy Murray	6	6
3	(Portugal) Nuno Borges	3	2
Q	(France) Arthur Cazaux	7	6
5	(Germany) Dominik Koepfer	5	2

Final
1/WC	(United Kingdom) Andy Murray	6	6
Q	(France) Arthur Cazaux	4	4

=== Top half ===
First round
1/WC	(United Kingdom) A Murray	6	6
Q	(Belgium) J De Loore	3	4
(France) H Grenier	6	6
(United Kingdom) J Choinski	4	4
Alt	(United Kingdom) R Peniston	6	6
(Italy) M Bellucci	2	1
(United States) D Kudla	6^{6}	2
8	(Switzerland) D Stricker	7^{8}	6
3	(Portugal) N Borges	6	6
PR	(South Korea) H Chung	3	2
(South Korea) S-c Hong	6^{4}	2
(China) Y Bu	7^{7}	6
Q	(Japan) R Noguchi	7	1	2
(United Kingdom) L Broady	5	6	6
(Japan) S Shimabukuro	6	1	6
7	(United States) A Kovacevic	4	6	4

Second round
1/WC	(United Kingdom) A Murray	6	7
(France) H Grenier	3	5
Alt	(United Kingdom) R Peniston	4	2
8	(Switzerland) D Stricker	6	6
3	(Portugal) N Borges	6	3	6
(China) Y Bu	3	6	3
(United Kingdom) L Broady	6^{4}	4
(Japan) S Shimabukuro	7^{7}	6

Quarterfinals
1/WC	(United Kingdom) A Murray	7^{7}	7
8	(Switzerland) D Stricker	6^{2}	5
3	(Portugal) N Borges	6	6
(Japan) S Shimabukuro	4	4

Semifinals
1/WC	(United Kingdom) A Murray	6	6
3	(Portugal) N Borges	3	2

=== Bottom half ===
First round
6	(Australia) T Kokkinakis	6	2	6^{5}
Q	(United States) Z Svajda	4	6	7^{7}
Alt	(Chinese Taipei) Y-h Hsu	4	3
Q	(France) A Cazaux	6	6
(Canada) G Diallo	6	6
(France) E Couacaud	3	3
Q	(United States) A Michelsen	2	7^{9}	6
4	(Australia) A Vukic	6	6^{7}	4
5	(Germany) D Koepfer	6	6
LL	(France) L Lokoli	2	4
(United States) S Johnson	6	3	3
WC	(United Kingdom) A Fery	4	6	6
(Finland) O Virtanen	3	6^{6}
WC	(United Kingdom) G Loffhagen	6	7^{8}
Q	(China) J Shang	7^{7}	4	6
2	(France) C Lestienne	6^{5}	6	4

Second round
Q	(United States) Z Svajda	6^{3}	6^{4}
Q	(France) A Cazaux	7^{7}	7^{7}
(Canada) G Diallo	3	7	6
Q	(United States) A Michelsen	6	5	3
5	(Germany) D Koepfer	6	6
WC	(United Kingdom) A Fery	4	2
WC	(United Kingdom) G Loffhagen	6	5	6
Q	(China) J Shang	4	7	3

Quarterfinals
Q	(France) A Cazaux	7^{7}	7
(Canada) G Diallo	6^{2}	5
5	(Germany) D Koepfer	7	4	6
WC	(United Kingdom) G Loffhagen	5	6	3

Semifinals
Q	(France) A Cazaux	7	6
5	(Germany) D Koepfer	5	2
