= 2024 Nottingham Open – Women's doubles =

Women's doubles
- 2024 Nottingham Open

Final
- Champions: (Canada) Gabriela Dabrowski (New Zealand) Erin Routliffe
- Runners-up: (United Kingdom) Harriet Dart (France) Diane Parry
- Score: 5–7, 6–3, [11–9]

Events
Singles	men	women
Doubles	men	women
← 2023 ·	Nottingham Open	· 2025 →

Gabriela Dabrowski and Erin Routliffe defeated Harriet Dart and Diane Parry in the final, 5–7, 6–3, [11–9] to win the women's doubles tennis title at the 2024 Nottingham Open. They saved a championship point in the match tiebreaker.

Ulrikke Eikeri and Ingrid Neel were the reigning champions, but Eikeri chose not to participate, while Neel chose to compete in 's-Hertogenbosch instead.

== Seeds ==
1. (Canada) Gabriela Dabrowski / (New Zealand) Erin Routliffe (champions)
2. (United States) Nicole Melichar-Martinez / (Australia) Ellen Perez (quarterfinals)
3. (United States) Caroline Dolehide / (United States) Desirae Krawczyk (first round)
4. (Japan) Ena Shibahara / (United Kingdom) Heather Watson (quarterfinals, withdrew)

== Draw ==
=== Key ===
- Q = Qualifier
- WC = Wild card
- LL = Lucky loser
- Alt = Alternate
- ITF = ITF entry
- PR = Protected ranking
- SR = Special ranking
- SE = Special exempt
- JE = Junior exempt
- JR = Junior Accelerator Programme entrant
- CO = College Accelerator Programme entrant
- NG = Next Gen Accelerator Program entrant
- w/o = Walkover
- r = Retired
- d = Defaulted

=== Draw ===
First round
1	(Canada) G Dabrowski (New Zealand) E Routliffe	6	6
(United Kingdom) A Barnett (United Kingdom) F Christie	1	0
(Japan) N Hibino (United Kingdom) S Murray Sharan	5	3
(United Kingdom) N Bains (United Kingdom) M Lumsden	7	6
3	(United States) C Dolehide (United States) D Krawczyk	6	3	[4]
(United States) A Krueger (China) S Zhang	3	6	[10]
(Poland) M Fręch (Poland) K Kawa	6	6
(United States) Q Gleason (China) Q Tang	2	3
(France) C Burel (Colombia) C Osorio	6	6
(China) H Guo (China) X Jiang	3	2
WC	(United Kingdom) SB Grey (United Kingdom) T Moore	3	4
4	(Japan) E Shibahara (United Kingdom) H Watson	6	6
(Chinese Taipei) H-c Chan (Chinese Taipei) F-h Wu	2	2
(United Kingdom) H Dart (France) D Parry	6	6
(United States) A Parks (United States) A Smith	2	2
2	(United States) N Melichar-Martinez (Australia) E Perez	6	6

Quarterfinals
1	(Canada) G Dabrowski (New Zealand) E Routliffe	6	6
(United Kingdom) N Bains (United Kingdom) M Lumsden	1	3
(United States) A Krueger (China) S Zhang	6^{3}	6	[10]
(Poland) M Fręch (Poland) K Kawa	7	3	[7]
(France) C Burel (Colombia) C Osorio	w/o
4	(Japan) E Shibahara (United Kingdom) H Watson
(United Kingdom) H Dart (France) D Parry	6	6
2	(United States) N Melichar-Martinez (Australia) E Perez	4	4

Semifinals
1	(Canada) G Dabrowski (New Zealand) E Routliffe	6	6
(United States) A Krueger (China) S Zhang	0	4
(France) C Burel (Colombia) C Osorio
(United Kingdom) H Dart (France) D Parry	w/o

Final
1	(Canada) G Dabrowski (New Zealand) E Routliffe	5	6	[11]
(United Kingdom) H Dart (France) D Parry	7	3	[9]
