= 2025 Nottingham Open – Women's doubles =

Women's doubles
- 2025 Nottingham Open

Final
- Champions: (Brazil) Beatriz Haddad Maia (Germany) Laura Siegemund
- Runners-up: (Kazakhstan) Anna Danilina (Japan) Ena Shibahara
- Score: 6–3, 6–2

Events
Singles	men	women
Doubles	men	women
← 2024 ·	Nottingham Open	· 2026 →

Beatriz Haddad Maia and Laura Siegemund defeated Anna Danilina and Ena Shibahara 6–3, 6–2 in the final to win the women's doubles title at the 2025 Nottingham Open. For the first time, Siegemund and Haddad Maia won a title together, being previously runner ups in other two WTA tournaments finals. This was the second Nottingham doubles title for Haddad Maia.

Gabriela Dabrowski and Erin Routliffe were the reigning champions, but Dabrowski chose not to participate and Routliffe chose to compete in the German Open.

== Seeds ==
1. (Chinese Taipei) Hsieh Su-wei / (China) Zhang Shuai (semifinals)
2. Irina Khromacheva / (Hungary) Fanny Stollár (semifinals)
3. (Brazil) Beatriz Haddad Maia / (Germany) Laura Siegemund (champions)
4. (Kazakhstan) Anna Danilina / (Japan) Ena Shibahara (final)

== Draw ==
=== Key ===
- Q = Qualifier
- WC = Wild card
- LL = Lucky loser
- Alt = Alternate
- ITF = ITF entry
- PR = Protected ranking
- SR = Special ranking
- SE = Special exempt
- JE = Junior exempt
- JR = Junior Accelerator Programme entrant
- CO = College Accelerator Programme entrant
- NG = Next Gen Accelerator Program entrant
- w/o = Walkover
- r = Retired
- d = Defaulted

=== Draw ===
First round
1	(Chinese Taipei) S-w Hsieh (China) S Zhang	6	6
(Spain) C Bucșa (Japan) M Kato	3	2
(Japan) E Hozumi (Indonesia) A Sutjiadi	6	2	[10]
(Norway) U Eikeri (Japan) M Ninomiya	1	6	[7]
4	(Kazakhstan) A Danilina (Japan) E Shibahara	6^{3}	7	[10]
(Netherlands) I Haverlag (United Kingdom) M Lumsden	7^{7}	5	[8]
(Czech Republic) A Dețiuc (Netherlands) B Schoofs	3	6	[10]
(Serbia) O Danilović (Poland) M Linette	6	4	[4]
(Japan) S Aoyama (Poland) K Piter	6	2	[4]
(Italy) A Moratelli (United States) S Santamaria	4	6	[10]
WC	(United Kingdom) J Burrage (United Kingdom) S Kartal	2	6^{3}
3	(Brazil) B Haddad Maia (Germany) L Siegemund	6	7^{7}
(United States) M Kessler (Denmark) C Tauson	3	6	[10]
(Georgia (country)) O Kalashnikova; E Pridankina	6	3	[12]
WC	(United Kingdom) H Klugman (United Kingdom) M Stojsavljevic	6	3	[4]
2	I Khromacheva (Hungary) F Stollár	2	6	[10]

Quarterfinals
1	(Chinese Taipei) S-w Hsieh (China) S Zhang	6	6
(Japan) E Hozumi (Indonesia) A Sutjiadi	4	3
4	(Kazakhstan) A Danilina (Japan) E Shibahara	7^{7}	6
(Czech Republic) A Dețiuc (Netherlands) B Schoofs	6^{5}	3
(Italy) A Moratelli (United States) S Santamaria	0	3
3	(Brazil) B Haddad Maia (Germany) L Siegemund	6	6
(Georgia (country)) O Kalashnikova; E Pridankina	6^{6}	2
2	I Khromacheva (Hungary) F Stollár	7^{8}	6

Semifinals
1	(Chinese Taipei) S-w Hsieh (China) S Zhang	7	4	[4]
4	(Kazakhstan) A Danilina (Japan) E Shibahara	5	6	[10]
3	(Brazil) B Haddad Maia (Germany) L Siegemund	7	3	[10]
2	I Khromacheva (Hungary) F Stollár	5	6	[5]

Final
4	(Kazakhstan) A Danilina (Japan) E Shibahara	3	2
3	(Brazil) B Haddad Maia (Germany) L Siegemund	6	6
