= 2023 Nottingham Open =

- Date: 12–18 June
- Edition: 15th (women); 27th (men)
- Category: WTA 250 (women); ATP Challenger Tour (men)
- Draw: 32S / 16D (women); 32S / 16D (men)
- Surface: Grass
- Location: Nottingham, United Kingdom
- Venue: Nottingham Tennis Centre

Champions

Men's singles
- (United Kingdom) Andy Murray

Women's singles
- (United Kingdom) Katie Boulter

Men's doubles
- (United Kingdom) Jacob Fearnley / (United Kingdom) Johannus Monday

Women's doubles
- (Norway) Ulrikke Eikeri / (Estonia) Ingrid Neel
← 2022 ·	Nottingham Open	· 2024 →

The 2023 Nottingham Open (also known as the Rothesay Open Nottingham for sponsorship purposes) was a professional tennis tournament played on outdoor grass courts. It was the 15th edition of the event for women and the 27th edition for men. It was classified as a WTA 250 on the 2023 WTA Tour for the women, and as an ATP Challenger Tour event for the men. The event took place at the Nottingham Tennis Centre in Nottingham, United Kingdom from 12 through 18 June 2023.

== Champions ==
=== Men's singles ===
- (United Kingdom) Andy Murray def. (France) Arthur Cazaux 6–4, 6–4.

=== Women's singles ===
- (United Kingdom) Katie Boulter def. (United Kingdom) Jodie Burrage, 6–3, 6–3

=== Men's doubles ===
- (United Kingdom) Jacob Fearnley / (United Kingdom) Johannus Monday def. (United Kingdom) Liam Broady / (United Kingdom) Jonny O'Mara 6–3, 6–7^{(6–8)}, [10–7].

=== Women's doubles ===
- (Norway) Ulrikke Eikeri / (Estonia) Ingrid Neel def. (United Kingdom) Harriet Dart / (United Kingdom) Heather Watson, 7–6^{(8–6)}, 5–7, [10–8]

== ATP singles main-draw entrants ==
=== Seeds ===
Country	Player	Rank^{1}	Seed
GBR	Andy Murray	43	1
FRA	Constant Lestienne	70	2
POR	Nuno Borges	80	3
AUS	Aleksandar Vukic	97	4
GER	Dominik Koepfer	103	5
AUS	Thanasi Kokkinakis	108	6
USA	Aleksandar Kovacevic	114	7
SUI	Dominic Stricker	116	8

- ^{1} Rankings are as of 29 May 2023.

=== Other entrants ===
The following players received wildcards into the main draw:

- (United Kingdom) Arthur Fery
- (United Kingdom) George Loffhagen
- (United Kingdom) Andy Murray

The following players received entry into the singles main draw using protected rankings:

- (South Korea) Chung Hyeon
- (Czech Republic) ~~Jiří Veselý~~

The following players received entry into the singles main draw as alternates:

- (Chinese Taipei) Hsu Yu-hsiou
- (United Kingdom) Ryan Peniston

The following players received entry from the qualifying draw:

- (France) Arthur Cazaux
- (Belgium) Joris De Loore
- (United States) Alex Michelsen
- (Japan) Rio Noguchi
- (China) Shang Juncheng
- (United States) Zachary Svajda

The following player received entry as a lucky loser:

- (France) Laurent Lokoli

== WTA singles main-draw entrants ==
=== Seeds ===
Country	Player	Rank^{1}	Seed
GRE	Maria Sakkari	8	1
BRA	Beatriz Haddad Maia	14	2
POL	Magda Linette	21	3
CRO	Donna Vekić	22	4
UKR	Anhelina Kalinina	26	5
CHN	Zhang Shuai	31	6
ITA	Camila Giorgi	37	7
CHN	Zhu Lin	40	8

- ^{1} Rankings are as of 29 May 2023.

=== Other entrants ===
The following players received wildcards into the main draw:

- (United Kingdom) Katie Boulter
- (Brazil) Beatriz Haddad Maia
- (Greece) Maria Sakkari
- (United Kingdom) Katie Swan

The following players received entry from the qualifying draw:

- (United Kingdom) Emily Appleton
- (United Kingdom) Harriet Dart
- (Australia) Olivia Gadecki
- (United Kingdom) Sonay Kartal
- (United States) Elizabeth Mandlik
- (United Kingdom) Heather Watson

The following player received entry as a lucky loser:

- (Ukraine) Daria Snigur

=== Withdrawals ===
- (United States) Lauren Davis → replaced by (United Kingdom) Jodie Burrage
- (United States) Bernarda Pera → replaced by (United States) Madison Brengle
- (Kazakhstan) Yulia Putintseva → replaced by (Czech Republic) Tereza Martincová
- (Australia) Ajla Tomljanović → replaced by (Poland) Magdalena Fręch
- (Ukraine) Lesia Tsurenko → replaced by (Ukraine) Daria Snigur

== WTA doubles main-draw entrants ==
=== Seeds ===
Country	Player	Country	Player	Rank^{1}	Seed
KAZ	Anna Danilina	CHN	Xu Yifan	49	1
USA	Asia Muhammad	MEX	Giuliana Olmos	52	2
TPE	Chan Hao-ching	TPE	Latisha Chan	63	3
UKR	Nadiia Kichenok	POL	Alicja Rosolska	94	4

- ^{1} Rankings are as of 29 May 2023.

=== Other entrants ===
The following pairs received wildcards into the doubles main draw:

- (United Kingdom) Emily Appleton / (United Kingdom) Jodie Burrage
- (United Kingdom) Harriet Dart / (United Kingdom) Heather Watson
