= 2023 Nottingham Open – Women's doubles =

Women's doubles
- 2023 Nottingham Open

Final
- Champions: (Norway) Ulrikke Eikeri (Estonia) Ingrid Neel
- Runners-up: (United Kingdom) Harriet Dart (United Kingdom) Heather Watson
- Score: 7–6^{(8–6)}, 5–7, [10–8]

Events
| Singles | men | women |
| Doubles | men | women |
| ← 2022 · | Nottingham Open | · 2024 → |

Ulrikke Eikeri and Ingrid Neel defeated Harriet Dart and Heather Watson in the final, 7–6^{(8–6)}, 5–7, [10–8] to win the women's doubles title at the 2023 Nottingham Open.

Beatriz Haddad Maia and Zhang Shuai were the reigning champions, but chose not to defend their title.

== Seeds ==
1. (Kazakhstan) Anna Danilina / (China) Xu Yifan (semifinals)
2. (United States) Asia Muhammad / (Mexico) Giuliana Olmos (quarterfinals)
3. (Chinese Taipei) Chan Hao-ching / (Chinese Taipei) Latisha Chan (first round)
4. (Ukraine) Nadiia Kichenok / (Poland) Alicja Rosolska (first round)

== Draw ==
=== Key ===
- Q = Qualifier
- WC = Wild card
- LL = Lucky loser
- Alt = Alternate
- SE = Special exempt
- PR = Protected ranking
- ITF = ITF entry
- JE = Junior exempt
- w/o = Walkover
- r = Retired
- d = Defaulted
- SR = Special ranking

=== Draw ===
First round
1 | (Kazakhstan) A Danilina (China) Y Xu | 5 | 6 | [10]
(United States) D Krawczyk (Switzerland) J Teichmann | 7 | 2 | [8]
(Georgia (country)) N Dzalamidze (United States) S Santamaria | 6 | 6
L Marozava (Brazil) I Gamarra Martins | 4 | 4
4 | (Ukraine) N Kichenok (Poland) A Rosolska | 5 | 6 | [7]
(Chinese Taipei) F-h Wu (China) L Zhu | 7 | 1 | [10]
(United Kingdom) F Christie (United Kingdom) A Collins | 6 | 4 | [4]
(Norway) U Eikeri (Estonia) I Neel | 4 | 6 | [10]
(Greece) M Sakkari (Croatia) D Vekić | 6 | 4 | [6]
(Spain) C Bucșa (Japan) M Ninomiya | 3 | 6 | [10]
WC | (United Kingdom) H Dart (United Kingdom) H Watson | 6 | 6
3 | (Chinese Taipei) H-c Chan (Chinese Taipei) L Chan | 3 | 4
WC | (United Kingdom) E Appleton (United Kingdom) J Burrage | 4 | 4
(United Kingdom) A Barnett (United Kingdom) O Nicholls | 6 | 6
(France) A Cornet (Ukraine) A Kalinina | 4 | 2
2 | (United States) A Muhammad (Mexico) G Olmos | 6 | 6

Quarterfinals
1 | (Kazakhstan) A Danilina (China) Y Xu | 5 | 7^{12} | [10]
(Georgia (country)) N Dzalamidze (United States) S Santamaria | 7 | 6^{10} | [7]
(Chinese Taipei) F-h Wu (China) L Zhu | 1 | 4
(Norway) U Eikeri (Estonia) I Neel | 6 | 6
(Spain) C Bucșa (Japan) M Ninomiya | 4 | 6^{7}
WC | (United Kingdom) H Dart (United Kingdom) H Watson | 6 | 7^{9}
(United Kingdom) A Barnett (United Kingdom) O Nicholls | 6 | 6
2 | (United States) A Muhammad (Mexico) G Olmos | 3 | 2

Semifinals
1 | (Kazakhstan) A Danilina (China) Y Xu | 4 | 4
(Norway) U Eikeri (Estonia) I Neel | 6 | 6
WC | (United Kingdom) H Dart (United Kingdom) H Watson | 6 | 6
(United Kingdom) A Barnett (United Kingdom) O Nicholls | 4 | 4

Final
(Norway) U Eikeri (Estonia) I Neel | 7^{8} | 5 | [10]
WC | (United Kingdom) H Dart (United Kingdom) H Watson | 6^{6} | 7 | [8]
