= 2024 Nottingham Open =

- Date: 10–16 June
- Edition: 16th (women); 28th (men)
- Category: WTA 250 (women); ATP Challenger Tour (men)
- Draw: 32S / 16D (women); 32S / 16D (men)
- Surface: Grass
- Location: Nottingham, United Kingdom
- Venue: Nottingham Tennis Centre

Champions

Men's singles
- (United Kingdom) Jacob Fearnley

Women's singles
- (United Kingdom) Katie Boulter

Men's doubles
- (Australia) John Peers / (United Kingdom) Marcus Willis

Women's doubles
- (Canada) Gabriela Dabrowski / (New Zealand) Erin Routliffe
← 2023 ·	Nottingham Open	· 2025 →

The 2024 Nottingham Open (also known as the Rothesay Open Nottingham for sponsorship purposes) was a professional tennis tournament played on outdoor grass courts. It was the 16th edition of the event for women and the 28th edition for men. It was classified as a WTA 250 tournament on the 2024 WTA Tour for the women, and as an ATP Challenger Tour event for the men. The event took place at the Nottingham Tennis Centre in Nottingham, United Kingdom from 10 to 16 June 2024.

== Champions ==
=== Men's singles ===
- (United Kingdom) Jacob Fearnley def. (United Kingdom) Charles Broom 4–6, 6–4, 6–3.

=== Women's singles ===
- (United Kingdom) Katie Boulter def. (Czech Republic) Karolína Plíšková 4–6, 6–3, 6–2

=== Men's doubles ===
- (Australia) John Peers / (United Kingdom) Marcus Willis def. (France) Harold Mayot / (Australia) Luke Saville 6–1, 6–7^{(1–7)}, [10–7].

=== Women's doubles ===
- (Canada) Gabriela Dabrowski / (New Zealand) Erin Routliffe def. (United Kingdom) Harriet Dart / (France) Diane Parry 5–7, 6–3, [11–9]

== ATP singles main-draw entrants ==
=== Seeds ===
Country	Player	Rank^{1}	Seed
GBR	Cameron Norrie	33	1
GBR	Dan Evans	62	2
CHN	Shang Juncheng	92	3
FRA	Harold Mayot	122	4
USA	Emilio Nava	126	5
BIH	Damir Džumhur	128	6
CRO	Duje Ajduković	129	7
RSA	Lloyd Harris	132	8

- ^{1} Rankings are as of 27 May 2024.

=== Other entrants ===
The following players received wildcards into the main draw:

- (United Kingdom) Arthur Fery
- (United Kingdom) Paul Jubb
- (United Kingdom) Cameron Norrie

The following players received entry into the singles main draw as alternates:

- (China) Bu Yunchaokete
- (United Kingdom) Billy Harris
- (Australia) Marc Polmans

The following players received entry from the qualifying draw:

- (Australia) Alex Bolt
- (United Kingdom) Charles Broom
- (United Kingdom) Jacob Fearnley
- (United Kingdom) Jack Pinnington Jones
- (United Kingdom) Henry Searle
- (Japan) Sho Shimabukuro

== WTA singles main-draw entrants ==
=== Seeds ===
Country	Player	Rank^{1}	Seed
TUN	Ons Jabeur	9	1
UKR	Marta Kostyuk	20	2
GBR	Katie Boulter	28	3
FRA	Clara Burel	44	4
POL	Magdalena Fręch	49	5
CZE	Karolína Plíšková	52	6
CHN	Zhu Lin	58	7
USA	Caroline Dolehide	60	8

- ^{1} Rankings are as of 27 May 2024.

=== Other entrants ===
The following players received wildcards into the main draw:

- (United Kingdom) Francesca Jones
- (Ukraine) Marta Kostyuk
- (United Kingdom) Emma Raducanu
- (United Kingdom) Heather Watson

The following players received entry from the qualifying draw:

- (United Kingdom) Emily Appleton
- (Australia) Kimberly Birrell
- (Czech Republic) Linda Fruhvirtová
- (Canada) Rebecca Marino
- (Japan) Ena Shibahara
- (Italy) Lucrezia Stefanini

=== Withdrawals ===
- (Romania) Jaqueline Cristian → replaced by (United States) Alycia Parks
- (Czech Republic) Barbora Krejčiková → replaced by (Ukraine) Daria Snigur
- Anastasia Pavlyuchenkova → replaced by (Colombia) Emiliana Arango
- (Ukraine) Lesia Tsurenko → replaced by (United Kingdom) Lily Miyazaki

== WTA doubles main-draw entrants ==
=== Seeds ===
Country	Player	Country	Player	Rank^{1}	Seed
CAN	Gabriela Dabrowski	NZL	Erin Routliffe	8	1
USA	Nicole Melichar-Martinez	AUS	Ellen Perez	14	2
USA	Caroline Dolehide	USA	Desirae Krawczyk	37	3
JPN	Ena Shibahara	GBR	Heather Watson	71	4

- ^{1} Rankings are as of 27 May 2024.

=== Other entrants ===
The following pair received a wildcard into the doubles main draw:

- (United Kingdom) Sarah Beth Grey / (United Kingdom) Tara Moore
