= 2023 Nottingham Open – Women's singles =

Women's singles
- 2023 Nottingham Open

Final
- Champion: (United Kingdom) Katie Boulter
- Runner-up: (United Kingdom) Jodie Burrage
- Score: 6–3, 6–3

Details
- Draw: 32 (6 Q / 4 WC )
- Seeds: 8

Events
Singles	men	women
Doubles	men	women
← 2022 ·	Nottingham Open	· 2024 →

Katie Boulter defeated Jodie Burrage in the final, 6–3, 6–3 to win the women's singles tennis title at the 2023 Nottingham Open. It was Boulter's first WTA Tour title and Burrage's first tour final.

Beatriz Haddad Maia was the defending champion, but lost in the first round to Daria Snigur.

This was the first WTA Tour event in which both finalists represented the United Kingdom since the 1977 San Francisco Open. This was also the first event since the 1975 Paris Indoors where three of the four semifinalists represented the United Kingdom.

== Seeds ==
1. (Greece) Maria Sakkari (second round)
2. (Brazil) Beatriz Haddad Maia (first round)
3. (Poland) Magda Linette (second round)
4. (Croatia) Donna Vekić (second round)
5. (Ukraine) Anhelina Kalinina (second round)
6. (China) Zhang Shuai (first round)
7. (Italy) Camila Giorgi (second round)
8. (China) Zhu Lin (second round)

== Draw ==
=== Key ===
- Q = Qualifier
- WC = Wild card
- LL = Lucky loser
- Alt = Alternate
- SE = Special exempt
- PR = Protected ranking
- ITF = ITF entry
- JE = Junior exempt
- w/o = Walkover
- r = Retired
- d = Defaulted
- SR = Special ranking

=== Finals ===
Semifinals
(France) Alizé Cornet	5	5
(United Kingdom) Jodie Burrage	7	7
Q	(United Kingdom) Heather Watson	4	5
WC	(United Kingdom) Katie Boulter	6	7

Final
(United Kingdom) Jodie Burrage	3	3
WC	(United Kingdom) Katie Boulter	6	6

=== Top half ===
First round
1/WC	(Greece) M Sakkari	6	7^{8}
(China) Xiy Wang	2	6^{6}
WC	(United Kingdom) K Swan	6	1	4
(France) A Cornet	2	6	6
(Bulgaria) V Tomova	2	6	6^{5}
Q	(United States) E Mandlik	6	3	7^{7}
(United States) M Brengle	6^{5}	2
7	(Italy) C Giorgi	7^{7}	6
3	(Poland) M Linette	6	6
Q	(Australia) O Gadecki	4	4
(Czech Republic) T Martincová	6^{5}	6	6^{4}
(United Kingdom) J Burrage	7^{7}	3	7^{7}
Q	(United Kingdom) S Kartal	3	7	2
(Poland) M Fręch	6	5	6
(United States) A Parks	6^{5}	2
8	(China) L Zhu	7^{7}	6

Second round
1/WC	(Greece) M Sakkari	1	4
(France) A Cornet	6	6
Q	(United States) E Mandlik	7	5	6
7	(Italy) C Giorgi	5	7	3
3	(Poland) M Linette	5	3
(United Kingdom) J Burrage	7	6
(Poland) M Fręch	6	6
8	(China) L Zhu	2	4

Quarterfinals
(France) A Cornet	6	4	6
Q	(United States) E Mandlik	3	6	3
(United Kingdom) J Burrage	6	3	7
(Poland) M Fręch	2	6	5

Semifinals
(France) A Cornet	5	5
(United Kingdom) J Burrage	7	7

=== Bottom half ===
First round
6	(China) S Zhang	1	4
(Germany) T Maria	6	6
(Germany) J Niemeier	4	3
Q	(United Kingdom) H Watson	6	6
(Switzerland) J Teichmann	4	3
(Switzerland) V Golubic	6	6
(Spain) C Bucșa	2	6	1
4	(Croatia) D Vekić	6	4	6
5	(Ukraine) A Kalinina	7	6
(Spain) N Párrizas Díaz	5	3
Q	(United Kingdom) H Dart	6	6
(Canada) R Marino	4	2
Q	(United Kingdom) E Appleton	1	3
WC	(United Kingdom) K Boulter	6	6
LL	(Ukraine) D Snigur	6	6
2/WC	(Brazil) B Haddad Maia	4	3

Second round
(Germany) T Maria	4	4
Q	(United Kingdom) H Watson	6	6
(Switzerland) V Golubic	6	6
4	(Croatia) D Vekić	4	1
5	(Ukraine) A Kalinina	0	5
Q	(United Kingdom) H Dart	6	7
WC	(United Kingdom) K Boulter	7	6
LL	(Ukraine) D Snigur	5	3

Quarterfinals
Q	(United Kingdom) H Watson	7^{7}	7
(Switzerland) V Golubic	6^{2}	5
Q	(United Kingdom) H Dart	3	5
WC	(United Kingdom) K Boulter	6	7

Semifinals
Q	(United Kingdom) H Watson	4	5
WC	(United Kingdom) K Boulter	6	7

== Qualifying ==
=== Seeds ===
1. (United States) Elizabeth Mandlik (qualified)
2. (United States) Sofia Kenin (first round)
3. (Switzerland) Viktorija Golubic (moved to main draw)
4. (Switzerland) Simona Waltert (first round)
5. (United Kingdom) Harriet Dart (qualified)
6. (Ukraine) Dayana Yastremska (first round)
7. (Australia) Olivia Gadecki (qualified)
8. (Romania) Elena-Gabriela Ruse (qualifying competition)
9. (Ukraine) Daria Snigur (qualifying competition, lucky loser)
10. (United Kingdom) Heather Watson (qualified)
11. (Mexico) Marcela Zacarías (first round)
12. (United States) Katrina Scott (first round)

=== Qualifiers ===
1. (United States) Elizabeth Mandlik
2. (United Kingdom) Sonay Kartal
3. (United Kingdom) Heather Watson
4. (Australia) Olivia Gadecki
5. (United Kingdom) Harriet Dart
6. (United Kingdom) Emily Appleton

=== Lucky loser ===
1. (Ukraine) Daria Snigur

=== Qualifying draw ===
==== First qualifier ====
First round
1	(United States) Elizabeth Mandlik	6	6
Iryna Shymanovich	4	4
WC	(United Kingdom) Naiktha Bains	2	4
9	(Ukraine) Daria Snigur	6	6

Qualifying competition
1	(United States) Elizabeth Mandlik	6	2	7
9	(Ukraine) Daria Snigur	2	6	5

==== Second qualifier ====
First round
2	(United States) Sofia Kenin	2	6^{6}
(United Kingdom) Sonay Kartal	6	7^{8}
(Chinese Taipei) Joanna Garland	4	6^{0}
8	(Romania) Elena-Gabriela Ruse	6	7^{7}

Qualifying competition
(United Kingdom) Sonay Kartal	6	7
8	(Romania) Elena-Gabriela Ruse	2	5

==== Third qualifier ====
First round
Alt	(United States) Asia Muhammad	7^{7}	4	2
WC	(United Kingdom) Amelia Rajecki	6^{2}	6	6
(United States) Sophie Chang	3	3
10	(United Kingdom) Heather Watson	6	6

Qualifying competition
WC	(United Kingdom) Amelia Rajecki	3	2
10	(United Kingdom) Heather Watson	6	6

==== Fourth qualifier ====
First round
4	(Switzerland) Simona Waltert	6^{3}	1
(Australia) Arina Rodionova	7^{7}	6
(Australia) Lizette Cabrera	5	3
7	(Australia) Olivia Gadecki	7	6

Qualifying competition
(Australia) Arina Rodionova	6	5	3
7	(Australia) Olivia Gadecki	2	7	6

==== Fifth qualifier ====
First round
5	(United Kingdom) Harriet Dart	6	6
(Australia) Maddison Inglis	3	4
WC	(United Kingdom) Eden Silva	6	1	6
11	(Mexico) Marcela Zacarías	2	6	1

Qualifying competition
5	(United Kingdom) Harriet Dart	6	6
WC	(United Kingdom) Eden Silva	0	4

==== Sixth qualifier ====
First round
6	(Ukraine) Dayana Yastremska	2	4
(Colombia) Emiliana Arango	6	6
WC	(United Kingdom) Emily Appleton	4	7^{7}	6
12	(United States) Katrina Scott	6	6^{4}	3

Qualifying competition
(Colombia) Emiliana Arango	1	1
WC	(United Kingdom) Emily Appleton	6	6
