= Shintaro Mochizuki =

Japanese tennis player (born 2003)

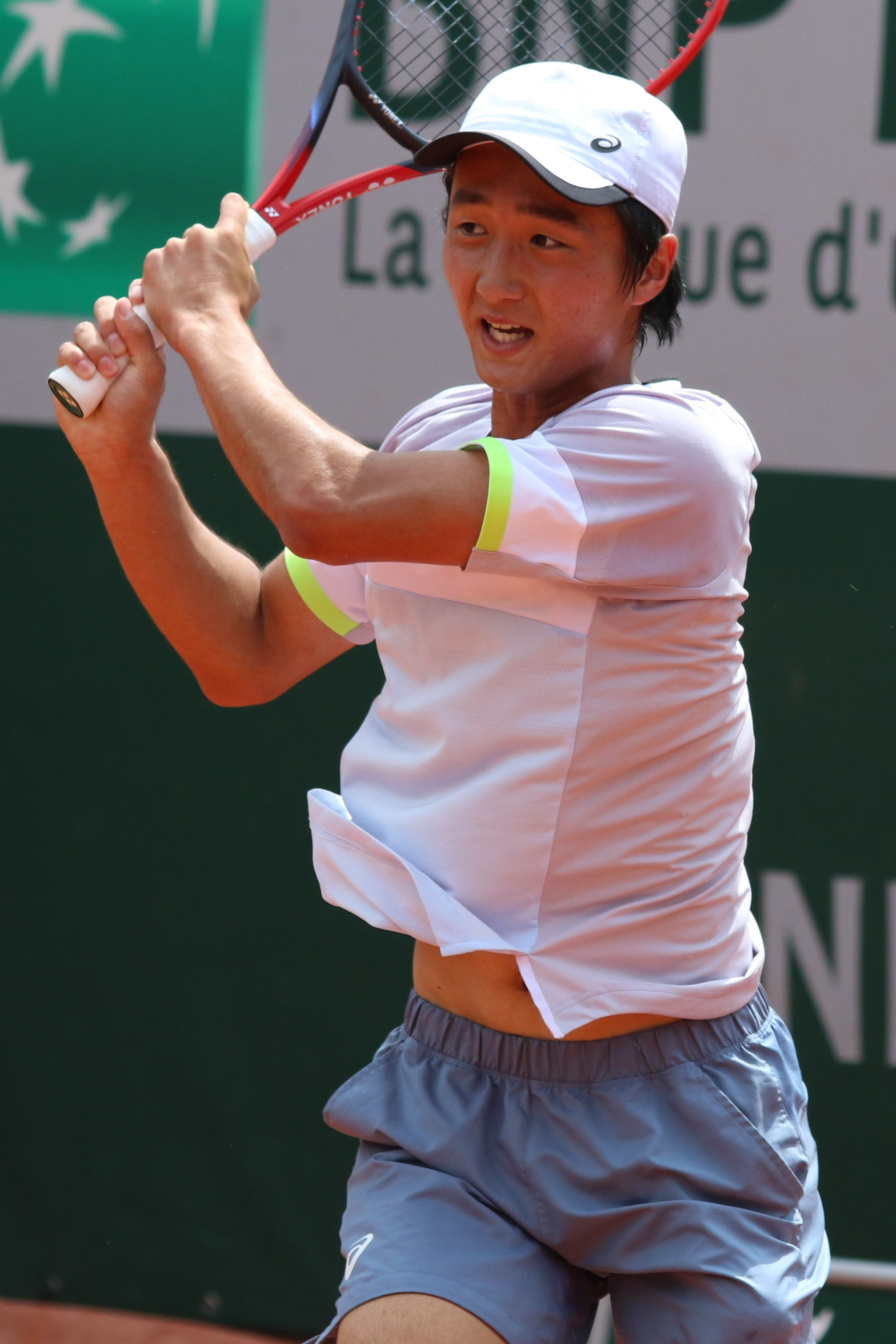
- Mochizuki at the 2023 French Open
- Country (sports): Japan
- Residence: Bradenton, Florida, United States
- Born: 2 June 2003 (age 23) Kawasaki, Japan
- Height: 1.75 m (5 ft 9 in)
- Turned pro: 2019
- Plays: Right-handed (two-handed backhand)
- Prize money: US $2,057,190

Singles
- Career record: 10–33
- Career titles: 0
- Highest ranking: No. 92 (10 November 2025)
- Current ranking: No. 117 (31 August 2026)

Grand Slam singles results
- Australian Open: 1R (2024, 2026)
- French Open: 1R (2024)
- Wimbledon: 4R (2026)
- US Open: 2R (2025)

Doubles
- Career record: 1–3
- Career titles: 0
- Highest ranking: No. 371 (18 October 2021)
- Last updated on: 31 August 2026.

Shintaro Mochizuki (Japanese: 望月 慎太郎, Mochizuki Shintarō, born 2 June 2003) is a Japanese professional tennis player. He has an ATP career-high singles ranking of world No. 92 on 10 November 2025 and a doubles ranking of No. 371 achieved on 18 October 2021. He is currently the No. 2 Japanese player. Mochizuki became the first Japanese male player in history to win a Grand Slam boys’ singles title at 2019 Wimbledon. Mochizuki achieved a career-high Junior ITF combined ranking of No. 1 on 15 July 2019.

== Early life ==
Shintaro Mochizuki was born in Kawasaki, Kanagawa, Japan. His name "Shintaro" was given by his father, inspired by the novelist and politician Shintaro Ishihara.

He started playing tennis at the age of 3. As a fifth grader, he represented Kawasaki Municipal Mukai Elementary School at the 32nd First Life National Elementary School Tennis Championship and managed to reach the semifinals.

At the age of 12, he passed the selection test for the Masaaki Morita Tennis Fund and went to the United States to train at the IMG Academy in Florida. He began attending N High School in 2019.

== Career ==
=== 2019: First Japanese man in a Junior major final ===
In 2019 Mochizuki won the Wimbledon title after becoming the first Japanese male player to reach a Grand Slam juniors singles final. In September that year, he led the Japanese team to win the Junior Davis Cup in Orlando, Florida.

=== 2021: ATP and Masters debuts ===
In February, Mochizuki made his ATP main draw debut as a wildcard at the 2021 Singapore Tennis Open where he lost to Altug Celikbilek in straight sets.

In March, he qualified for his first ATP Masters 1000 main draw at the 2021 Miami Open having been given a wildcard for the qualifying competition.

He received a wildcard for the qualifying event at the 2021 Wimbledon Championships where he defeated Hugo Gaston to reach the second qualifying round.

=== 2023-2024: Challenger title, Major debut, ATP semifinal, top 150 ===
He won his first-ever trophy as a professional by winning the 2023 Open Città della Disfida Challenger in Barletta, Italy, defeating the Argentine Santiago Rodriguez Taverna in straight sets, becoming the fourth teenage Challenger champion in the season (after Fils, Van Assche and Medjedovic). He reached the top 200 at world No. 198 on 12 June 2023. In July, he made his Grand Slam debut after qualifying for the main draw of the 2023 Wimbledon Championships, but lost in the first round to 16th seed Tommy Paul in straight sets. At the 2023 Hall of Fame Open he lost to Liam Broady also in the first round.

Ranked No. 215, he received a wildcard for the ATP 500 2023 Japan Championships. After nine attempts, he finally won his first match at the ATP Tour level, beating Tomás Martín Etcheverry in straight sets. Next he defeated top seed Taylor Fritz for his first Top 10 win, to reach his first ATP tour-level quarterfinal. In the quarterfinals, he defeated Alexei Popyrin to reach his first-ever ATP semifinal. He became the lowest-ranked Tokyo semifinalist since then-world No. 479 Kelly Jones in 1986. As a result, he moved up 84 positions to World No. 131 in the rankings on 23 October 2023. In November, following a quarterfinal showing at the Sydney Challenger he reached the top 130 in the rankings and 13th in the 2023 Next Generation ATP Finals race.

He made his debut in the main draw at the 2024 Australian Open as a lucky loser, but lost to Tomáš Macháč in straight sets. He also qualified for the main draw at the 2024 French Open.

=== 2025-2026: First Major wins and fourth round, top 100 ===
In January 2025, Mochizuki won his second Challenger at the 2025 Open Nouvelle-Calédonie title defeating Moerani Bouzige in straight sets. In June, Mochizuki reached the semifinals at the Lexus Ilkley Open and the final of the 2025 Nottingham Open. Following these good results in grass he qualified for the main draw at the 2025 Wimbledon Championships for the second time, and recorded his first main draw Grand Slam win over fellow qualifier Giulio Zeppieri in a five sets match, over two days. Following reaching the quarterfinals with wins over Arthur Cazaux and fourth seed Luciano Darderi at the 2025 Almaty Open, Mochizuki reached the top 100 in the singles rankings on 20 October 2025.

In July 2026, ranked No. 151 Mochizuki reached a major fourth round for the first time in his career at the 2026 Wimbledon Championships, upsetting 23rd seed Rafael Jodar, after qualifying for the main draw, previously defeating Ethan Quinn and Max Basing in the second and first rounds respectively. In the fourth round he lost in straight sets against the world n° 1 and defending champion Jannik Sinner, who would later confirm the title.

== Playing Style ==
Standing at only 5 foot 9, Mochizuki is not a prolific server. However, he is renowned for his low bouncing strokes and exceptional shotmaking. His profile was highly anticipated during his time in Japan, though he has struggled in the ATP tour, with his playstyle contrasting the high spin, heavy-serve environment.

== Performance timeline ==
Key
W	F	SF	QF	#R	RR	Q#	DNQ	A	NH

(W) winner; (F) finalist; (SF) semifinalist; (QF) quarterfinalist; (#R) rounds 4, 3, 2, 1; (RR) round-robin stage; (Q#) qualification round; (DNQ) did not qualify; (A) absent; (NH) not held; (SR) strike rate (events won / competed); (W–L) win–loss record.

=== Singles ===
Tournament	2021	2022	2023	2024	2025	2026	SR	W–L	Win%
Grand Slam tournaments
Australian Open	A	A	A	1R	Q1	1R	0 / 2	0–2	0%
French Open	A	A	Q1	1R	Q1	Q1	0 / 1	0–1	0%
Wimbledon	Q2	A	1R	Q1	2R	4R	0 / 3	4–3	57%
US Open	A	A	Q2	Q3	2R	1R	0 / 2	1–2	33%
Win–loss	0-0	0-0	0–1	0–2	2–2	3–3	0 / 8	5–8	38%
ATP Masters 1000
Indian Wells Masters	Q1	A	A	1R	A	Q2	0 / 1	0–1	0%
Miami Open	1R	Q2	A	Q1	Q2	Q1	0 / 1	0–1	0%
Monte Carlo Masters	A	A	A	A	A	A	0 / 0	0–0	–
Madrid Open	A	A	A	Q2	A	A	0 / 0	0-0	–
Italian Open	A	A	A	A	A		0 / 0	0–0	–
Canadian Open	A	A	A	A	1R		0 / 1	0–1	0%
Cincinnati Masters	A	A	A	A	Q2		0 / 0	0–0	–
Shanghai Masters	NH		Q1	Q1	Q1		0 / 0	0–0	–
Paris Masters	A	A	A	A	A		0 / 0	0–0	–
Win–loss	0–1	0–0	0–0	0–1	0–1		0 / 3	0–3	0%

== ATP Challenger Tour finals ==
=== Singles: 4 (2 titles, 2 runner-ups) ===
Legend ATP Challenger Tour (2–2)

Result	W–L	Date	Tournament	Tier	Surface	Opponent	Score
Win	1–0	Apr 2023	Barletta, Italy	Challenger	Clay	(Argentina) Santiago Rodríguez Taverna	6–1, 6–4
Win	2–0	Jan 2025	Nouméa, New Caledonia	Challenger	Hard	(Australia) Moerani Bouzige	6–1, 6–3
Loss	2–1	Feb 2025	Bengalaru, India	Challenger	Hard	(United States) Brandon Holt	3–6, 3–6
Loss	2–2	Jun 2025	Nottingham, UK	Challenger	Grass	(Croatia) Marin Čilić	2–6, 3–6

=== Doubles: 2 (1 title, 1 runner-up) ===
Legend ATP Challenger Tour (1–1)

Result	W–L	Date	Tournament	Tier	Surface	Partner	Opponents	Score
Loss	0–1	Feb 2020	Cuernavaca, Mexico	Challenger	Hard	(Spain) Carlos Gómez-Herrera	(Australia) Luke Saville (Australia) John-Patrick Smith	3–6, 7–6^{(7–4)}, [5–10]
Win	1–1	Jan 2023	Tenerife II, Spain	Challenger	Hard	(United States) Christian Harrison	(Italy) Francesco Passaro (Italy) Matteo Gigante	6–4, 6–3

== ITF World Tennis Tour finals ==
=== Singles: 1 (1 runner-up) ===
Legend ITF WTT (0–1)

Result	W–L	Date	Tournament	Tier	Surface	Opponent	Score
Loss	0–1	Aug 2021	M25 Grodzisk Mazowiecki, Poland	WTT	Clay	(Hungary) Zsombor Piros	3–6, 6–7^{(3–7)}

=== Doubles: 7 (7 titles) ===
Legend ITF WTT (7–0)	Finals by surface Hard (7–0) Clay (0–0)

Result	W–L	Date	Tournament	Tier	Surface	Partner	Opponents	Score
Win	1–0	Aug 2019	M15 Cancún, Mexico	WTT	Hard	(Argentina) Thiago Agustín Tirante	(United Kingdom) Isaac Stoute (Australia) Brandon Walkin	6–7^{(4–7)}, 7–5, [10–4]
Win	2–0	Oct 2019	M15 Changwon, South Korea	WTT	Hard	(Japan) Naoki Nakagawa	(South Korea) Chung Hong (South Korea) Lee Jea-moon	6–4, 6–4
Win	3–0	Jan 2020	M15 Cancún, Mexico	WTT	Hard	(Argentina) Alejo Lorenzo Lingua Lavallén	(United States) Tanner Smith (United States) Jordi Arconada	walkover
Win	4–0	Oct 2020	M15 Sharm El Sheikh, Egypt	WTT	Hard	(Japan) Rio Noguchi	(Netherlands) Ryan Nijboer (Netherlands) Gijs Brouwer	6–2, 7–5
Win	5–0	Nov 2020	M15 Santo Domingo, Dominican Republic	WTT	Hard	(Dominican Republic) Nick Hardt	(Chile) Gonzalo Lama (Ecuador) Antonio Cayetano March	6–3, 6–3
Win	6–0	Dec 2020	M15 Santo Domingo, Dominican Republic	WTT	Hard	(Dominican Republic) Nick Hardt	(United States) Nick Chappell (United States) Keegan Smith	4–6, 7–6^{(7–2)}, [10–5]
Win	7–0	Apr 2021	M15 Antalya, Turkey	WTT	Hard	(Japan) Rio Noguchi	(Germany) Constantin Schmitz (Lebanon) Benjamin Hassan	7–6^{(7–2)}, 6–2

== Junior Grand Slam finals ==
=== Singles: 1 (1 title) ===
Result	Year	Tournament	Surface	Opponent	Score
Win	2019	Wimbledon	Grass	(Spain) Carlos Gimeno Valero	6–3, 6–2

== Wins over top 10 players ==
- He has a 1–1 win-loss record against players who were, at the time the match was played, ranked in the top 10.

Season	2023	Total
Wins	1	1

#	Player	Rank	Event	Surface	Rd	Score	SMR
2023
1.	(United States) Taylor Fritz	10	Japan Open, Japan	Hard	2R	0–6, 6–4, 7–6^{(7–2)}	215

*As of 26 May 2024
