= 2025 Nottingham Open – Women's singles =

Women's singles
- 2025 Nottingham Open

Final
- Champion: (United States) McCartney Kessler
- Runner-up: (Ukraine) Dayana Yastremska
- Score: 6–4, 7–5

Details
- Draw: 32 (6 Q / 4 WC )
- Seeds: 8

Events
| Singles | men | women |
| Doubles | men | women |
- Nottingham Open

McCartney Kessler defeated Dayana Yastremska in the final, 6–4, 7–5 to win the women's singles tennis title at the 2025 Nottingham Open. It was her third WTA Tour title.

Katie Boulter was the two-time defending champion, but lost in the quarterfinals to Kessler.

== Seeds ==
1. (Brazil) Beatriz Haddad Maia (first round)
2. (Denmark) Clara Tauson (quarterfinals)
3. (Belgium) Elise Mertens (withdrew)
4. (Kazakhstan) Yulia Putintseva (second round)
5. (Canada) Leylah Fernandez (quarterfinals)
6. (Poland) Magda Linette (semifinals)
7. (Czech Republic) Linda Nosková (quarterfinals)
8. (United Kingdom) Katie Boulter (quarterfinals)
9. (Serbia) Olga Danilović (first round)

== Draw ==
Key

- Q = Qualifier
- WC = Wild card
- LL = Lucky loser
- Alt = Alternate
- ITF = ITF entry
- PR = Protected ranking
- SR = Special ranking
- SE = Special exempt
- JE = Junior exempt
- JR = Junior Accelerator Programme entrant
- CO = College Accelerator Programme entrant
- NG = Next Gen Accelerator Program entrant
- w/o = Walkover
- r = Retired
- d = Defaulted

=== Finals ===
Semifinals
(United States) McCartney Kessler | 6 | 6
(Slovakia) Rebecca Šramková | 4 | 2
(Ukraine) Dayana Yastremska | 6 | 6
6 | (Poland) Magda Linette | 4 | 4

Final
(United States) McCartney Kessler | 6 | 7
(Ukraine) Dayana Yastremska | 4 | 5

=== Top half ===
First round
1 | (Brazil) B Haddad Maia | 5 | 7^{7} | 5
(United States) M Kessler | 7 | 6^{3} | 7
PR | (China) L Zhu | 6 | 6
Q | A Sasnovich | 4 | 1
(United Kingdom) S Kartal | 6 | 6
Q | (France) L Jeanjean | 3 | 4
(New Zealand) L Sun | 2 | 2
8 | (United Kingdom) K Boulter | 6 | 6
4 | (Kazakhstan) Y Putintseva | 6 | 6
WC | (United Kingdom) H Klugman | 2 | 2
Q | (Germany) L Siegemund | 6^{2} | 6 | 6^{6}
(Slovakia) R Šramková | 7^{7} | 4 | 7^{8}
WC | (United Kingdom) F Jones | 7 | 6
WC | (United Kingdom) H Dart | 5 | 4
LL | (Romania) A Todoni | 4 | 6 | 6^{6}
7 | (Czech Republic) L Nosková | 6 | 3 | 7^{8}

Second round
(United States) M Kessler | 6 | 6
PR | (China) L Zhu | 1 | 4
(United Kingdom) S Kartal | 4 | 6 | 5
8 | (United Kingdom) K Boulter | 6 | 1 | 7
4 | (Kazakhstan) Y Putintseva | 1 | 6 | 4
(Slovakia) R Šramková | 6 | 4 | 6
WC | (United Kingdom) F Jones | 1 | 3
7 | (Czech Republic) L Nosková | 6 | 6

Quarterfinals
(United States) M Kessler | 6 | 3 | 6
8 | (United Kingdom) K Boulter | 3 | 6 | 4
(Slovakia) R Šramková | 3 | 6 | 6
7 | (Czech Republic) L Nosková | 6 | 4 | 4

Semifinals
(United States) M Kessler | 6 | 6
(Slovakia) R Šramková | 4 | 2

=== Bottom half ===
First round
5 | (Canada) L Fernandez | 6 | 4 | 7
(Netherlands) S Lamens | 3 | 6 | 5
LL | (Ukraine) Y Starodubtseva | 3 | 3
LL | (Spain) C Bucșa | 6 | 6
Q | (Croatia) A Ružić | 6 | 6
(Italy) L Bronzetti | 0 | 4
(Ukraine) D Yastremska | 6 | 7^{7}
9 | (Serbia) O Danilović | 4 | 6^{4}
6 | (Poland) M Linette | 6 | 6
Q | (Philippines) A Eala | 4 | 3
WC | (United Kingdom) M Xu | 6 | 6
(United States) K Volynets | 3 | 3
A Blinkova | 6 | 6
Q | K Rakhimova | 2 | 3
(Australia) K Birrell | 5 | 2
2 | (Denmark) C Tauson | 7 | 6

Second round
5 | (Canada) L Fernandez | 6 | 6
LL | (Spain) C Bucșa | 3 | 4
Q | (Croatia) A Ružić | 2 | 6 | 4
(Ukraine) D Yastremska | 6 | 2 | 6
6 | (Poland) M Linette | 7 | 6
WC | (United Kingdom) M Xu | 5 | 1
A Blinkova | 4 | 4
2 | (Denmark) C Tauson | 6 | 6

Quarterfinals
5 | (Canada) L Fernandez | 3 | 6^{6}
(Ukraine) D Yastremska | 6 | 7^{8}
6 | (Poland) M Linette | 6 | 7
2 | (Denmark) C Tauson | 2 | 5

Semifinals
(Ukraine) D Yastremska | 6 | 6
6 | (Poland) M Linette | 4 | 4

== Qualifying ==
=== Seeds ===
1. (Romania) Jaqueline Cristian (first round)
2. (Australia) Maya Joint (first round)
3. (United States) Hailey Baptiste (first round)
4. (Ukraine) Yuliia Starodubtseva (qualifying competition, lucky loser)
5. (Netherlands) Suzan Lamens (moved to main draw)
6. (Philippines) Alexandra Eala (qualified)
7. (Colombia) Emiliana Arango (first round)
8. (United States) Bernarda Pera (withdrew)
9. Kamilla Rakhimova (qualified)
10. (China) Yuan Yue (withdrew)
11. (Romania) Anca Todoni (qualifying competition, lucky loser)
12. (France) Léolia Jeanjean (qualified)

=== Qualifiers ===
1. (Croatia) Antonia Ružić
2. Aliaksandra Sasnovich
3. (Germany) Laura Siegemund
4. Kamilla Rakhimova
5. (France) Léolia Jeanjean
6. (Philippines) Alexandra Eala

=== Lucky losers ===
1. (Romania) Anca Todoni
2. (Ukraine) Yuliia Starodubtseva
3. (Spain) Cristina Bucșa

=== Qualifying draw ===
==== First qualifier ====
First round
1 | (Romania) Jaqueline Cristian | 6 | 6^{4} | 2
(Australia) Olivia Gadecki | 4 | 7^{7} | 6
(Croatia) Antonia Ružić | 7^{8} | 6
Alt | (United States) Varvara Lepchenko | 6^{6} | 3

Qualifying competition
(Australia) Olivia Gadecki | 3 | 6 | 3
(Croatia) Antonia Ružić | 6 | 0 | 6

==== Second qualifier ====
First round
2 | (Australia) Maya Joint | 6 | 4 | 1
Aliaksandra Sasnovich | 3 | 6 | 6
(Spain) Cristina Bucșa | 6 | 6
7 | (Colombia) Emiliana Arango | 0 | 4

Qualifying competition
Aliaksandra Sasnovich | 6 | 6
(Spain) Cristina Bucșa | 3 | 4

==== Third qualifier ====
First round
3 | (United States) Hailey Baptiste | 3 | 3
(Germany) Laura Siegemund | 6 | 6
PR | (France) Alizé Cornet | 6 | 4 | 3
Alt | (Japan) Ena Shibahara | 3 | 6 | 6

Qualifying competition
(Germany) Laura Siegemund | 6 | 3 | 6
Alt | (Japan) Ena Shibahara | 4 | 6 | 4

==== Fourth qualifier ====
First round
4 | (Ukraine) Yuliia Starodubtseva | 7^{7} | 6
(France) Diane Parry | 6^{2} | 1
WC | (United Kingdom) Amarni Banks | 3 | 6 | 3
9 | Kamilla Rakhimova | 6 | 1 | 6

Qualifying competition
4 | (Ukraine) Yuliia Starodubtseva | 7 | 5 | 2
9 | Kamilla Rakhimova | 5 | 7 | 6

==== Fifth qualifier ====
First round
Alt | Anastasia Zakharova | 2 | 4
WC | (United Kingdom) Mika Stojsavljevic | 6 | 6
WC | (United Kingdom) Heather Watson | 4 | 1
12 | (France) Léolia Jeanjean | 6 | 6

Qualifying competition
WC | (United Kingdom) Mika Stojsavljevic | 2 | 3
12 | (France) Léolia Jeanjean | 6 | 6

==== Sixth qualifier ====
First round
6 | (Philippines) Alexandra Eala | 6 | 3 | 6
(France) Varvara Gracheva | 3 | 6 | 3
WC | (United Kingdom) Jodie Burrage | 6^{2} | 1
11 | (Romania) Anca Todoni | 7^{7} | 6

Qualifying competition
6 | (Philippines) Alexandra Eala | 6 | 6^{4} | 6
11 | (Romania) Anca Todoni | 3 | 7^{7} | 3
