= Moerani Bouzige =

Australian tennis player (born 1999)

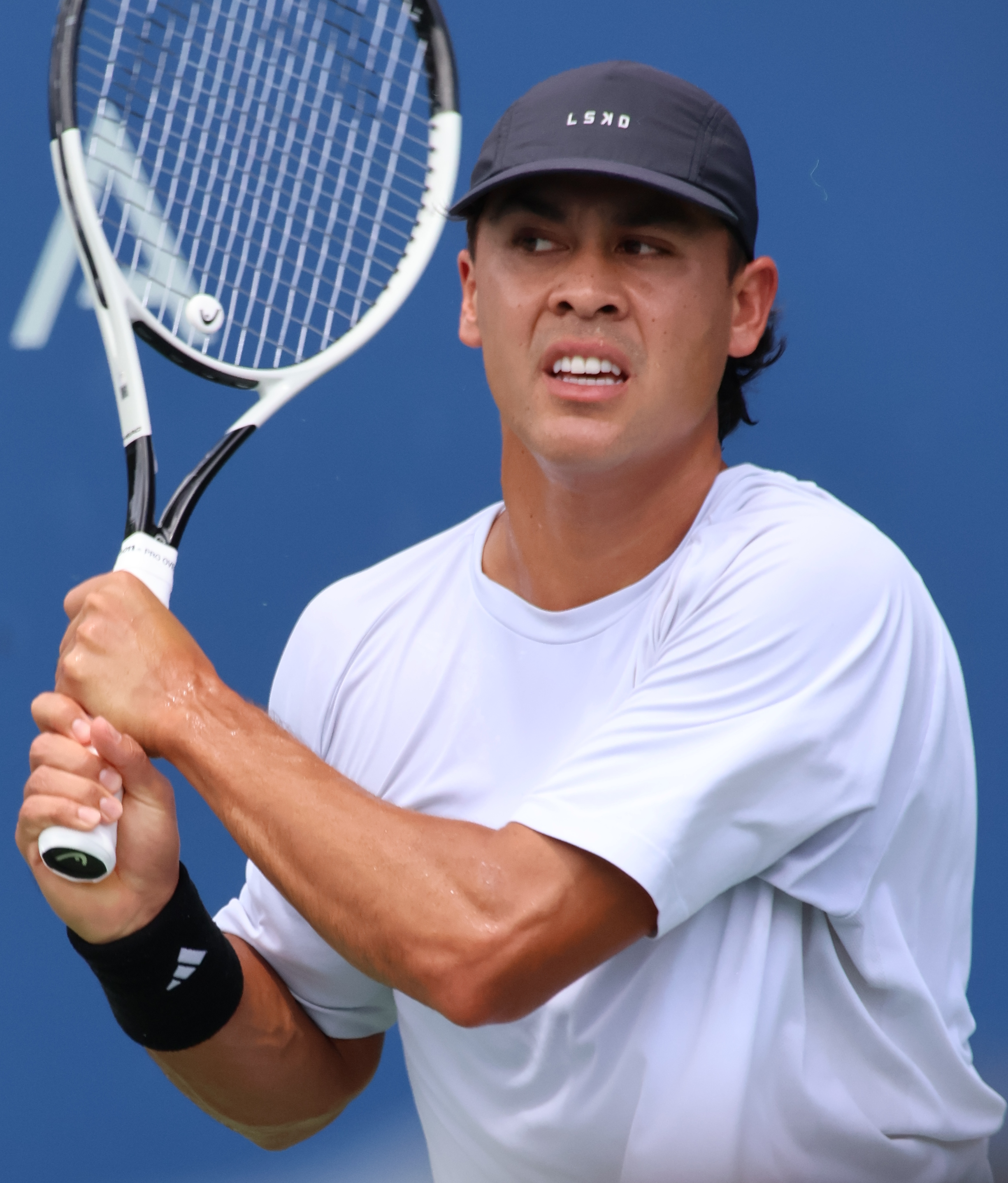
- Bouzige at the 2025 Washington Open
- Country (sports): Australia
- Born: 13 July 1999 (age 27) Gold Coast, Australia
- Height: 1.80 m (5 ft 11 in)
- Plays: Right-handed (two-handed backhand)
- Coach: Mitch Walden
- Prize money: US $167,239

Singles
- Career record: 0–0 (at ATP Tour level, Grand Slam level, and in Davis Cup)
- Career titles: 3 ITF
- Highest ranking: No. 314 (10 November 2025)
- Current ranking: No. 480 (9 November 2026)

Grand Slam singles results
- Australian Open: Q1 (2026)

Doubles
- Career record: 0–1 (at ATP Tour level, Grand Slam level, and in Davis Cup)
- Career titles: 0
- Highest ranking: No. 845 (28 July 2025)
- Current ranking: No. 1,457 (9 November 2026)
- Last updated on: 9 November 2026.

Moerani Bouzige (born 13 July 1999) is an Australian tennis player. He has a career high ATP singles ranking of world No. 314 achieved on 10 November 2025 and a doubles ranking of No. 845 achieved on 28 July 2025.

== Personal life ==
Bouzige's mother is from Tahiti, whilst his father is from France.

== Career ==
=== 2017-2021: Career beginnings, First ITF title ===
Bouzige made his debut on the ITF tour in September 2017 at the Australia F4. He won his first ITF title in October 2021 and second the following month.

=== 2022: ATP debut in doubles ===
Bouzige made his ATP main draw debut at the 2022 Sydney International after receiving a wildcard into the doubles main draw with Matthew Romios.

=== 2025: First Challenger final, top 350 ===
Ranked No. 517 at the Nouméa Challenger in New Caledonia, Bouzige made it to his first final at this level by upsetting Márton Fucsovics, for his first win against a top 100 player, and former top-50 player Constant Lestienne on his way there. He lost to Shintaro Mochizuki in the final. As a result he reached the top 500 at world No. 410, moving more than 100 positions up in the ATP singles rankings on 6 January 2025.

== Performance timeline ==
Key
W	F	SF	QF	#R	RR	Q#	DNQ	A	NH

(W) winner; (F) finalist; (SF) semifinalist; (QF) quarterfinalist; (#R) rounds 4, 3, 2, 1; (RR) round-robin stage; (Q#) qualification round; (DNQ) did not qualify; (A) absent; (NH) not held; (SR) strike rate (events won / competed); (W–L) win–loss record.
To avoid confusion and double counting, these charts are updated at the conclusion of a tournament or when the player's participation has ended.

=== Singles ===
Tournament	2026	SR	W–L	Win %
Grand Slam tournaments
Australian Open	Q1	0 / 0	0–0	–
French Open		0 / 0	0–0	–
Wimbledon		0 / 0	0–0	–
US Open		0 / 0	0–0	–
Win–loss	0–0	0 / 0	0–0	–
ATP Masters 1000
Indian Wells Masters		0 / 0	0–0	–
Miami Open		0 / 0	0–0	–
Monte Carlo Masters		0 / 0	0–0	–
Madrid Open		0 / 0	0-0	–
Italian Open		0 / 0	0–0	–
Canadian Open		0 / 0	0–0	–
Cincinnati Masters		0 / 0	0–0	–
Shanghai Masters		0 / 0	0–0	–
Paris Masters		0 / 0	0–0	–
Win–loss	0–0	0 / 0	0–0	–

== ATP Challenger Tour finals ==
=== Singles: 1 (1 runner-up) ===
Legend ATP Challenger Tour (0–1)

Result	W–L	Date	Tournament	Tier	Surface	Opponent	Score
Loss	0–1	Jan 2025	Nouméa, New Caledonia	Challenger	Hard	(Japan) Shintaro Mochizuki	1–6, 3–6

== ITF World Tennis Tour finals ==
=== Singles: 8 (5 titles, 3 runner-ups) ===
Legend ITF WTT (5–3)	Finals by surface Hard (5–3) Clay (0–0)

Result	W–L	Date	Tournament	Tier	Surface	Opponent	Score
Win	1–0	Oct 2021	M15 Monastir, Tunisia	WTT	Hard	(Monaco) Valentin Vacherot	6–4, 7–5
Loss	1–1	Oct 2021	M15 Monastir, Tunisia	WTT	Hard	(Tunisia) Skander Mansouri	2–6, 4–6
Win	2–1	Nov 2021	M15 Monastir, Tunisia	WTT	Hard	(France) Mathys Erhard	7–5, 6–4
Win	3–1	Dec 2024	M15 Tauranga, New Zealand	WTT	Hard	(Japan) Jay Dylan Hara Friend	7–5, 6–4
Loss	3–2	Jun 2025	M25 Santo Domingo, Dominican Republic	WTT	Hard	(Dominican Republic) Roberto Cid Subervi	3–6, 4–6
Loss	3–3	Nov 2025	M15 Yanagawa City, Japan	WTT	Hard	(United States) Braden Shick	3–6, 3–6
Win	4–3	Apr 2026	M15 Kashiwa, Japan	WTT	Hard	(Japan) Hikaru Shiraishi	6–3, 6–3
Win	5–3	May 2026	M25 Nakhon Pathom, Thailand	WTT	Hard	(Japan) Takuya Kumasaka	6–7^{(5–7)}, 7–6^{(7–4)}, 7–6^{(7–2)}

=== Doubles: 1 (1 runner-up) ===
Legend ITF WTT (0–1)

Result	W–L	Date	Tournament	Tier	Surface	Partner	Opponents	Score
Loss	0–1	Aug 2024	M15 Bali, Indonesia	WTT	Hard	(Japan) Shintaro Imai	(Netherlands) Thijmen Loof (Belgium) Tibo Colson	4–6, 3–6
