= Arthur Cazaux =

French tennis player (born 2002)

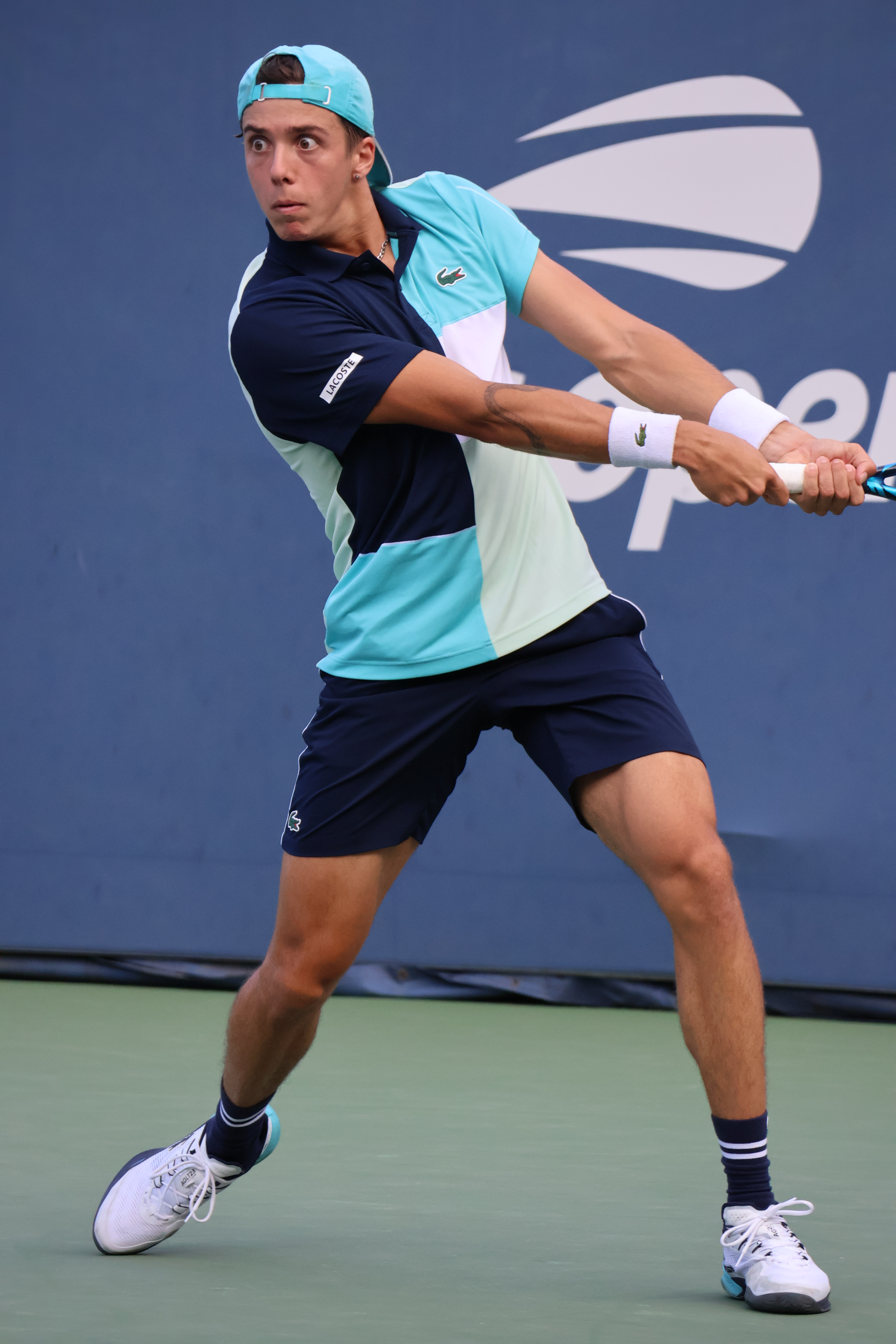
- Cazaux at the 2023 US Open
- Country (sports): France
- Residence: Les Matelles, France
- Born: 23 August 2002 (age 23) Montpellier, France
- Height: 1.83 m (6 ft 0 in)
- Turned pro: 2020
- Plays: Right-handed (two-handed backhand)
- Coach: Sam Sumyk (Oct 2024-), Stéphane Huet (2022-Jul 2024)
- Prize money: US $2,301,033

Singles
- Career record: 28–35
- Career titles: 0
- Highest ranking: No. 58 (13 October 2025)
- Current ranking: No. 138 (3 August 2026)

Grand Slam singles results
- Australian Open: 4R (2024)
- French Open: 1R (2021, 2023, 2024, 2025)
- Wimbledon: 2R (2024, 2025)
- US Open: 2R (2024)

Doubles
- Career record: 2–9
- Career titles: 0
- Highest ranking: No. 430 (1 November 2021)

Grand Slam doubles results
- Australian Open: 1R (2025)
- French Open: 2R (2021, 2025)
- Last updated on: 3 August 2026.

Arthur Cazaux (French pronunciation: [aʁtyʁ kazo]; born 23 August 2002) is a French professional tennis player. He has a career-high ATP singles ranking of world No. 58, achieved on 13 October 2025 and a doubles ranking of No. 430, achieved on 1 November 2021. Cazaux has won four Challenger singles titles.

== Junior career ==
As a junior, Cazaux reached his highest ranking of No. 4 in the world, in the combined singles and doubles junior ranking system. This was highlighted by a runner-up finish at the 2020 Australian Open where he was defeated by compatriot Harold Mayot in straight sets.

== Professional career ==
=== 2020: Grand Slam doubles debut ===
Cazaux made his ATP main draw debut at the 2020 Open 13 in the doubles draw partnering Harold Mayot as a wildcard entry. They were defeated in the first round by Nicolas Mahut and Vasek Pospisil in straight sets 5–7, 1–6.

Pairing Mayot again, they were also given a wildcard entry into the main doubles draw of the 2020 French Open but were defeated in the first round by Łukasz Kubot and Marcelo Melo in straight sets.

=== 2021: Major & top 300 singles debuts, first ATP win ===
Cazaux made his singles debut the following year in 2021 Geneva Open as a wildcard, winning his first ATP match against compatriot Adrian Mannarino in three sets. As a result, he entered the top 500 for the first time in his career.

He made his Grand Slam main draw singles debut at the 2021 French Open as a wildcard where he was defeated by Kamil Majchrzak. At the same tournament, he reached the second round in doubles also as a wildcard partnering with fellow Frenchman Hugo Gaston.

=== 2022: First Challenger title ===
Cazaux won his maiden Challenger title in September 2022 in Nonthaburi, Thailand, entering the main draw as a qualifier and defeating Omar Jasika in the final. Reaching the final of that same tournament the following week, Cazaux lost to Brit, Stuart Parker, pulling out due to injury in the second set.

=== 2023: Top 125 and US Open debuts ===
In January 2023, he won his second title also at the Nonthaburi 2 Challenger defeating former top 50 player Lloyd Harris. Continuing his good form, Cazaux reached the final again the following week, losing to Japanese player Sho Shimabukuro in straight sets. As a result of his performances, he achieved a new career-high, moving more than 100 positions up to No. 265 on 16 January 2023. He reached the top 200 at No. 199 on 10 April 2023 following a semifinal showing in the Zadar Challenger.

He received a wildcard for the 2023 French Open. He reached the Challenger 125 final at the 2023 Nottingham Open as a qualifier, his first on grass, defeating Gabriel Diallo and fifth seed Dominik Koepfer in the semifinals without dropping a set, before losing to top seed Andy Murray in the final. As a result he reached the top 150 at No. 147 on 19 June 2023 and seventh place in the Next Gen race. The following week, he reached the semifinals of the 2023 Ilkley Trophy and reached a new career high of world No. 139 on 26 June 2023.

Ranked No. 119 in August, Cazaux made his debut at the US Open as a lucky loser, losing to eight seed Andrey Rublev in the first round. He received a wildcard for the 2023 Moselle Open.

=== 2024: Major fourth round, Masters debut & third round, top 65 ===
In January, Cazaux won his third Challenger at the Open Nouvelle-Calédonie defeating fellow Frenchman Enzo Couacaud in the final.

Ranked No. 122, for his Grand Slam tournament debut at the Australian Open, Cazaux received a wildcard. He recorded his first Major win defeating Laslo Djere in five sets. In the second round, he upset world No. 8 Holger Rune in four sets. He defeated 28th seed Tallon Griekspoor in straight sets to advance to the fourth round of a Major for the first time in his career. In the fourth round, he lost to Hubert Hurkacz in straight sets. As a result, he reached the top 85 in the rankings. A week later, in Montpellier, he defeated Maximilian Marterer and reached the top 80 in the rankings. At the end February, he qualified for the Dubai Tennis Championships and defeated Lorenzo Musetti in the first round.

In June, Cazaux participated in his third French Open but lost in the first round to 29th seed Tomás Martín Etcheverry. In July, he won his first Wimbledon match by defeating Zizou Bergs in the first round in five sets with a super tiebreak. He made his Masters debut and recorded his first win at this level at the Shanghai Masters over Marin Čilić. Following the late withdrawal of top seed Jannik Sinner at the Paris Masters, Cazaux entered the main draw as a lucky loser replacement directly into the second round. He then defeated Ben Shelton in straight sets to reach the third round for the first time at a Masters level.

=== 2025: First ATP final, top 60 ===
At the Australian Open, Cazaux defeated 28th seed Sebastián Báez in five sets to reach the second round, where he lost to Jacob Fearnley.

In July, Cazaux reached his first ATP Tour semifinal at the Swiss Open Gstaad, defeating fourth seed Tomás Martín Etcheverry in the second round. He lost in the semifinal to second seed Alexander Bublik. As a result, Cazaux reentered the top 100 on 21 July 2025. The following week, Cazaux reached his first ATP Tour final at the Generali Open Kitzbühel, entering the main draw as a special exempt. He defeated seventh seed Francisco Comesaña in the second round. and Jan-Lennard Struff in the quarterfinal. He then defeated fellow countryman Arthur Rinderknech to reach the final. As a result he returned to the top 75 in the singles rankings on 28 July 2025. In the final, he lost to Alexander Bublik for the second consecutive week.

In October, Cazaux won the Jinan Open title, defeating Mackenzie McDonald in the final. As a result he made his debut in the top 60 at world No. 58 on 13 October 2025.

== Performance timeline ==
Key
W	F	SF	QF	#R	RR	Q#	DNQ	A	NH

(W) winner; (F) finalist; (SF) semifinalist; (QF) quarterfinalist; (#R) rounds 4, 3, 2, 1; (RR) round-robin stage; (Q#) qualification round; (DNQ) did not qualify; (A) absent; (NH) not held; (SR) strike rate (events won / competed); (W–L) win–loss record.
To avoid confusion and double counting, these charts are updated at the conclusion of a tournament or when the player's participation has ended.

=== Singles ===
Current through the 2026 Miami Open.

Tournament	2020	2021	2022	2023	2024	2025	2026	SR	W–L	Win %
Grand Slam tournaments
Australian Open	A	A	A	A	4R	2R	A	0 / 2	4–2	67%
French Open	Q1	1R	Q1	1R	1R	1R	A	0 / 4	0–4	0%
Wimbledon	NH	A	A	Q1	2R	2R	A	0 / 2	2–2	50%
US Open	A	A	A	1R	2R	Q3		0 / 2	1–2	33%
Win–loss	0–0	0–1	0–0	0–2	5–4	2–3	0–0	0 / 10	7–10	41%
ATP Tour Masters 1000
Indian Wells Open	NH	A	A	A	Q1	Q1	A	0 / 0	0–0	–
Miami Open	NH	A	A	A	Q1	A	2R	0 / 1	1–1	50%
Monte-Carlo Masters	NH	A	A	A	A	A	A	0 / 0	0–0	–
Madrid Open	NH	Q2	A	Q2	A	A	A	0 / 0	0–0	–
Italian Open	A	A	A	A	A	A	A	0 / 0	0–0	–
Canadian Open	NH	A	A	A	Q2	A		0 / 0	0–0	–
Cincinnati Open	A	A	A	A	Q2	2R		0 / 1	0–1	0%
Shanghai Masters	NH			A	2R	2R		0 / 2	2–2	50%
Paris Masters	Q1	A	A	Q1	3R	2R		0 / 2	2–2	50%
Win–loss	0–0	0–0	0–0	0–0	2–2	2–3	1–1	0 / 6	5–6	45%

=== Doubles ===
Tournament	2020	2021	2022	2023	2024	2025	SR	W–L	Win %
Grand Slam tournaments
Australian Open	A	A	A	A	A	1R	0 / 1	0–1	0%
French Open	1R	2R	A	A	A	2R	0 / 3	2–3	40%
Wimbledon	NH	A	A	A	A	A	0 / 0	0–0	–
US Open	A	A	A	A	A	A	0 / 0	0–0	–
Win–loss	0–1	1–2	0–0	0–0	0–0	1–2	0 / 4	2–4	33%

== ATP Tour finals ==
=== Singles: 1 (runner-up) ===
Legend Grand Slam (–) ATP 1000 (–) ATP 500 (–) ATP 250 (0–1)	Finals by surface Hard (–) Clay (0–1) Grass (–)	Finals by setting Outdoor (0–1) Indoor (–)

Result	W–L	Date	Tournament	Tier	Surface	Opponent	Score
Loss	0–1	Jul 2025	Generali Open Kitzbühel, Austria	ATP 250	Clay	(Kazakhstan) Alexander Bublik	4–6, 3–6

== ATP Challenger Tour finals ==
=== Singles: 9 (4 titles, 5 runner-ups) ===
Legend ATP Challenger Tour (4–5)	Finals by surface Hard (4–4) Grass (0–1)

Result	W–L	Date	Tournament	Tier	Surface	Opponent	Score
Win	1–0	Sep 2022	Nonthaburi Challenger II, Thailand	Challenger	Hard	(Australia) Omar Jasika	7–6^{(8–6)}, 6–4
Loss	1–1	Sep 2022	Nonthaburi Challenger III, Thailand	Challenger	Hard	(United Kingdom) Stuart Parker	4–6, 1–4 ret.
Win	2–1	Jan 2023	Nonthaburi Challenger II, Thailand (2)	Challenger	Hard	(South Africa) Lloyd Harris	7–6^{(7–5)}, 6–2
Loss	2–2	Jan 2023	Nonthaburi Challenger III, Thailand	Challenger	Hard	(Japan) Sho Shimabukuro	2–6, 5–7
Loss	2–3	Jun 2023	Nottingham Open, UK	Challenger	Grass	(United Kingdom) Andy Murray	4–6, 4–6
Loss	2–4	Jul 2023	Lexington Challenger, US	Challenger	Hard	(United States) Steve Johnson	6–7^{(5–7)}, 4–6
Win	3–4	Jan 2024	Open Nouvelle-Calédonie, New Caledonia (France)	Challenger	Hard	(France) Enzo Couacaud	6–1, 6–1
Loss	3–5	Oct 2024	Shenzhen Longhua Open, China	Challenger	Hard	(United States) Mackenzie McDonald	4–6, 6–7^{(4–7)}
Win	4–5	Oct 2025	Jinan Open, China	Challenger	Hard	(United States) Mackenzie McDonald	6–3, 6–2

== ITF World Tennis Tour finals ==
=== Singles: 6 (3 titles, 3 runner-ups) ===
Legend ITF WTT (3–3)	Finals by surface Hard (3–1) Clay (0–2)

Result	W–L	Date	Tournament	Tier	Surface	Opponent	Score
Loss	0–1	Oct 2019	M15 Pretoria, South Africa	WTT	Hard	(Bulgaria) Alexander Donski	6–7^{(3–7)}, 7–6^{(7–5)}, 6–7^{(6–8)}
Win	1–1	Dec 2020	M15 Torelló, Spain	WTT	Hard	(France) Quentin Robert	4–6, 7–6^{(7–3)}, 6–2
Loss	1–2	Apr 2021	M25 Meerbusch, Germany	WTT	Clay	(Austria) Alexander Erler	2–6, 6–4, 5–7
Loss	1–3	Aug 2021	M25+H Bacău, Romania	WTT	Clay	(Israel) Yshai Oliel	4–6, 6–4, 4–6
Win	2–3	Oct 2021	M25 Setúbal, Portugal	WTT	Hard	(Australia) Rinky Hijikata	7–5, 6–0
Win	3–3	Oct 2021	M25 Quinta do Lago, Portugal	WTT	Hard	(Japan) Naoki Nakagawa	6–3, 6–4

=== Doubles: 2 (2 runner-ups) ===
Legend ITF WTT (0–2)

Result	W–L	Date	Tournament	Tier	Surface	Partner	Opponents	Score
Loss	0–1	Dec 2020	M15 Torelló, Spain	WTT	Hard	(Switzerland) Leandro Riedi	(Spain) Gerard Granollers Pujol (Spain) Oriol Roca Batalla	6–7^{(7–9)}, 6–3, [9–11]
Loss	0–2	Apr 2021	M25 Angers, France	WTT	Clay	(France) Titouan Droguet	(France) Manuel Guinard (France) Corentin Denolly	walkover

== Junior Grand Slam finals ==
=== Singles: 1 (runner-up) ===
Result	Year	Tournament	Surface	Opponent	Score
Loss	2020	Australian Open	Hard	(France) Harold Mayot	4–6, 1–6

== Wins over top 10 players ==
- Cazaux has a 1–3 record against players who were, at the time the match was played, ranked in the top 10.

Season	2024	2025	Total
Wins	1	0	1

#	Player	Rank	Event	Surface	Rd	Score	ACR
2024
1.	(Denmark) Holger Rune	8	Australian Open, Australia	Hard	2R	7–6^{(7–4)}, 6–4, 4–6, 6–3	122
