= 2022 Maspalomas Challenger – Singles =

Singles
- 2022 Maspalomas Challenger

Final
- Champion: (Serbia) Dušan Lajović
- Runner-up: (Canada) Steven Diez
- Score: 6–1, 6–4

Events
Singles	Doubles
Maspalomas Challenger	· 2023 →

This was the first edition of the tournament.

Dušan Lajović won the title after defeating Steven Diez 6–1, 6–4 in the final.

== Seeds ==
1. (Serbia) Dušan Lajović (champion)
2. (Germany) Yannick Hanfmann (withdrew)
3. (Czech Republic) Vít Kopřiva (quarterfinals, withdrew)
4. Alexander Shevchenko (first round)
5. (Belgium) Kimmer Coppejans (first round)
6. (Bulgaria) Adrian Andreev (quarterfinals, withdrew)
7. (Czech Republic) Dalibor Svrčina (first round)
8. (Serbia) Miljan Zekić (first round)

== Draw ==
=== Key ===
- Q = Qualifier
- WC = Wild card
- LL = Lucky loser
- Alt = Alternate
- SE = Special exempt
- PR = Protected ranking
- ITF = ITF entry
- JE = Junior exempt
- w/o = Walkover
- r = Retired
- d = Defaulted
- SR = Special ranking

=== Finals ===
Semifinals
1	(Serbia) Dušan Lajović	3	6	6
WC	(Spain) Pablo Llamas Ruiz	6	2	2
(Spain) Oriol Roca Batalla	2	4
(Canada) Steven Diez	6	6

Final
1	(Serbia) Dušan Lajović	6	6
(Canada) Steven Diez	1	4

=== Top half ===
First round
1	(Serbia) D Lajović	6	6
Q	Andrey Chepelev	3	4
(Netherlands) R Haase	6	4	3
Q	(Spain) Imanol López Morillo	3	6	6
(Sweden) DN Mădăraș	2^{r}
WC	(Spain) Iñaki Cabrera Bello	5
Q	(Spain) D Pérez Sanz	2	1
6	(Bulgaria) A Andreev	6	6
4	A Shevchenko	7	2	2
WC	(Spain) A Moro Cañas	5	6	6
WC	(Spain) P Llamas Ruiz	6	6
(Poland) D Michalski	1	4
(Italy) L Giustino	7	6
(Norway) V Durasovic	5	4
(Austria) L Neumayer	6	6
8	(Serbia) M Zekić	1	3

Second round
1	(Serbia) D Lajović	6	6
Q	(Spain) I López Morillo	3	4
WC	(Spain) I Cabrera Bello	1	1
6	(Bulgaria) A Andreev	6	6
WC	(Spain) A Moro Cañas	4	6^{6}
WC	(Spain) P Llamas Ruiz	6	7^{8}
(Italy) L Giustino	6	7
(Austria) L Neumayer	3	5

Quarterfinals
1	(Serbia) D Lajović	w/o
6	(Bulgaria) A Andreev
WC	(Spain) P Llamas Ruiz	6	7^{9}
(Italy) L Giustino	4	6^{7}

Semifinals
1	(Serbia) D Lajović	3	6	6
WC	(Spain) P Llamas Ruiz	6	2	2

=== Bottom half ===
First round
7	(Czech Republic) D Svrčina	6^{4}	3
(Belgium) M Geerts	7^{7}	6
(Spain) N Sánchez Izquierdo	2	4
(Spain) O Roca Batalla	6	6
(Germany) Timo Stodder	7^{7}	6^{8}	6
Q	(Ukraine) Eric Vanshelboim	6^{2}	7^{10}	1
(Spain) J Barranco Cosano	2	1^{r}
3	(Czech Republic) V Kopřiva	6	1
5	(Belgium) K Coppejans	7	3	6^{4}
(France) T Droguet	5	6	7^{7}
LL	(Germany) R Molleker	4	6	6^{4}
Q	(Italy) GM Moroni	6	3	7^{7}
(Monaco) V Vacherot	6	2	4
(Canada) S Diez	1	6	6
Alt	(Italy) Edoardo Lavagno	4	6	1
Q	(Tunisia) M Echargui	6	3	6

Second round
(Belgium) M Geerts	6^{5}	6^{5}
(Spain) O Roca Batalla	7^{7}	7^{7}
(Germany) T Stodder	1	7	3
3	(Czech Republic) V Kopřiva	6	5	6
(France) T Droguet	6^{6}	5
Q	(Italy) GM Moroni	7^{8}	7
(Canada) S Diez	6	3	6
Q	(Tunisia) M Echargui	4	6	3

Quarterfinals
(Spain) O Roca Batalla	w/o
3	(Czech Republic) V Kopřiva
Q	(Italy) GM Moroni	2	6	4
(Canada) S Diez	6	1	6

Semifinals
(Spain) O Roca Batalla	2	4
(Canada) S Diez	6	6
