= 2022 Maspalomas Challenger – Doubles =

Doubles
- 2022 Maspalomas Challenger

Final
- Champions: (United States) Evan King (United States) Reese Stalder
- Runners-up: (Italy) Marco Bortolotti (Spain) Sergio Martos Gornés
- Score: 6–3, 5–7, [11–9]

Events
Singles	Doubles
- Maspalomas Challenger

This was the first edition of the tournament.

Evan King and Reese Stalder won the title after defeating Marco Bortolotti and Sergio Martos Gornés 6–3, 5–7, [11–9] in the final.

== Seeds ==
1. (Serbia) Ivan Sabanov / (Serbia) Matej Sabanov (semifinals)
2. (Italy) Marco Bortolotti / (Spain) Sergio Martos Gornés (final)
3. (Finland) Patrik Niklas-Salminen / (Netherlands) Bart Stevens (semifinals)
4. (United States) Evan King / (United States) Reese Stalder (champions)

== Draw ==
Key

- Q = Qualifier
- WC = Wild card
- LL = Lucky loser
- Alt = Alternate
- ITF = ITF entry
- PR = Protected ranking
- SR = Special ranking
- SE = Special exempt
- JE = Junior exempt
- JR = Junior Accelerator Programme entrant
- CO = College Accelerator Programme entrant
- NG = Next Gen Accelerator Program entrant
- w/o = Walkover
- r = Retired
- d = Defaulted

First round
1	(Serbia) I Sabanov (Serbia) M Sabanov	6	7
(Norway) V Durasovic (Belgium) M Geerts	2	5
(Sweden) F Bergevi (Ukraine) Eric Vanshelboim	6^{2}	6	[10]
(Czech Republic) V Kopřiva (Czech Republic) D Svrčina	7^{7}	2	[3]
4	(United States) E King (United States) R Stalder	6	2	[10]
(Germany) R Molleker (Germany) Timo Stodder	2	6	[3]
WC	(Spain) A Barroso Campos (Spain) Imanol López Morillo	6	6
WC	(Spain) M Alcalá Gurri (Spain) Ignasi de Rueda de Genover	1	2
(Croatia) Z Babić (Poland) P Matuszewski	1	0^{r}
(France) T Arribagé (France) T Droguet	6	0
(Spain) J Barranco Cosano (Spain) D Vega Hernández	4	1
3	(Finland) P Niklas-Salminen (Netherlands) B Stevens	6	6
(Canada) S Diez (Italy) GM Moroni	5	4
2	(Italy) M Bortolotti (Spain) S Martos Gornés	7	6

Quarterfinals
1	(Serbia) I Sabanov (Serbia) M Sabanov	4	6	[10]
(Sweden) F Bergevi (Ukraine) E Vanshelboim	6	3	[6]
4	(United States) E King (United States) R Stalder	6	4	[11]
WC	(Spain) A Barroso Campos (Spain) I López Morillo	4	6	[9]
(France) T Arribagé (France) T Droguet	7^{7}	4	[5]
3	(Finland) P Niklas-Salminen (Netherlands) B Stevens	6^{4}	6	[10]
(Spain) A Moro Cañas (Spain) O Roca Batalla	6^{0}	4
2	(Italy) M Bortolotti (Spain) S Martos Gornés	7^{7}	6

Semifinals
1	(Serbia) I Sabanov (Serbia) M Sabanov	6^{7}	6^{4}
4	(United States) E King (United States) R Stalder	7^{9}	7^{7}
3	(Finland) P Niklas-Salminen (Netherlands) B Stevens	6^{4}	6	[4]
2	(Italy) M Bortolotti (Spain) S Martos Gornés	7^{7}	4	[10]

Final
4	(United States) E King (United States) R Stalder	6	5	[11]
2	(Italy) M Bortolotti (Spain) S Martos Gornés	3	7	[9]
