= 2023 Maspalomas Challenger – Doubles =

Doubles
- 2023 Maspalomas Challenger

Final
- Champions: (United Kingdom) Scott Duncan (United Kingdom) Marcus Willis
- Runners-up: (France) Théo Arribagé (France) Sadio Doumbia
- Score: 7–6^{(7–5)}, 6–4

Events
Singles	Doubles
- Maspalomas Challenger

Evan King and Reese Stalder were the defending champions but chose not to defend their title.

Scott Duncan and Marcus Willis won the title after defeating Théo Arribagé and Sadio Doumbia 7–6^{(7–5)}, 6–4 in the final.

== Seeds ==
1. (France) Théo Arribagé / (France) Sadio Doumbia (final)
2. (India) Jeevan Nedunchezhiyan / (India) Vijay Sundar Prashanth (semifinals)
3. (Spain) Sergio Martos Gornés / (Netherlands) Sem Verbeek (semifinals)
4. (United Kingdom) Scott Duncan / (United Kingdom) Marcus Willis (champions)

== Draw ==
Key

- Q = Qualifier
- WC = Wild card
- LL = Lucky loser
- Alt = Alternate
- ITF = ITF entry
- PR = Protected ranking
- SR = Special ranking
- SE = Special exempt
- JE = Junior exempt
- JR = Junior Accelerator Programme entrant
- CO = College Accelerator Programme entrant
- NG = Next Gen Accelerator Program entrant
- w/o = Walkover
- r = Retired
- d = Defaulted

First round
1	(France) T Arribagé (France) S Doumbia	4	6	[10]
(Ukraine) O Krutykh (Ukraine) Eric Vanshelboim	6	3	[5]
(Spain) A Barroso Campos (Spain) Imanol López Morillo	2	6^{5}
WC	(Ukraine) G Kravchenko (Spain) Sergi Pérez Contri	6	7^{7}
3	(Spain) S Martos Gornés (Netherlands) S Verbeek	6	6
(Spain) J Barranco Cosano (Spain) D Vega Hernández	2	2
Alt	Svyatoslav Gulin (Bulgaria) Leonid Sheyngezikht	6	3	[8]
(Italy) R Brancaccio (Canada) S Diez	3	6	[10]
(Greece) M Kalovelonis (Canada) K Stevenson	7	7^{7}
(Germany) R Molleker (Germany) H Squire	5	6^{3}
(Spain) D Jordà Sanchis (Spain) N Sánchez Izquierdo	6	2	[7]
4	(United Kingdom) S Duncan (United Kingdom) M Willis	2	6	[10]
(Czech Republic) J Forejtek (India) S Nagal
Andrey Chepelev; I Gakhov	w/o
(Romania) A Jecan (Romania) Dan Alexandru Tomescu	6^{7}	3
2	(India) J Nedunchezhiyan (India) VS Prashanth	7^{9}	6

Quarterfinals
1	(France) T Arribagé (France) S Doumbia	6	7
WC	(Ukraine) G Kravchenko (Spain) S Pérez Contri	4	5
3	(Spain) S Martos Gornés (Netherlands) S Verbeek	6	6
(Italy) R Brancaccio (Canada) S Diez	4	4
(Greece) M Kalovelonis (Canada) K Stevenson	3	4
4	(United Kingdom) S Duncan (United Kingdom) M Willis	6	6
A Chepelev; I Gakhov	6^{4}	6	[8]
2	(India) J Nedunchezhiyan (India) VS Prashanth	7^{7}	4	[10]

Semifinals
1	(France) T Arribagé (France) S Doumbia	6	7
3	(Spain) S Martos Gornés (Netherlands) S Verbeek	4	5
4	(United Kingdom) S Duncan (United Kingdom) M Willis	6	6^{2}	[11]
2	(India) J Nedunchezhiyan (India) VS Prashanth	2	7^{7}	[9]

Final
1	(France) T Arribagé (France) S Doumbia	6^{5}	4
4	(United Kingdom) S Duncan (United Kingdom) M Willis	7^{7}	6
