= 2024 Taipei OEC Open – Doubles =

Doubles
- 2024 Taipei OEC Open

Final
- Champions: (United Kingdom) David Stevenson (United Kingdom) Marcus Willis
- Runners-up: (South Korea) Nam Ji-sung (United Kingdom) Joshua Paris
- Score: 6–3, 6–3

Events
Singles	Doubles
Taipei OEC Open	· 2025 →

This was the first edition of the tournament.

David Stevenson and Marcus Willis won the title after defeating Nam Ji-sung and Joshua Paris 6–3, 6–3 in the final.

== Seeds ==
1. (United States) Evan King / (United States) Reese Stalder (first round)
2. (India) Rithvik Choudary Bollipalli / (India) Arjun Kadhe (withdrew)
3. (Colombia) Cristian Rodríguez / (Australia) Matthew Romios (quarterfinals)
4. (India) Anirudh Chandrasekar / (India) Niki Kaliyanda Poonacha (first round)
5. (United Kingdom) David Stevenson / (United Kingdom) Marcus Willis (champions)

== Draw ==
=== Key ===
- Q = Qualifier
- WC = Wild card
- LL = Lucky loser
- Alt = Alternate
- SE = Special exempt
- PR = Protected ranking
- ITF = ITF entry
- JE = Junior exempt
- w/o = Walkover
- r = Retired
- d = Defaulted
- SR = Special ranking

=== Draw ===
First round
1	(United States) E King (United States) R Stalder	6	6^{3}	[12]
WC	(Chinese Taipei) T-l Wu (Chinese Taipei) C-h Yi	3	7^{7}	[14]
WC	(Chinese Taipei) C-p Hsieh (Indonesia) C Rungkat	4	6	[9]
(South Korea) J-s Nam (United Kingdom) J Paris	6	4	[11]
4	(India) A Chandrasekar (India) N Kaliyanda Poonacha	7^{8}	1	[4]
(Japan) T Matsui (Japan) K Uesugi	6^{6}	6	[10]
(Philippines) FC Alcantara (New Zealand) F Reynolds	3	5
PR	(Thailand) P Isaro (India) D Sharan	6	7
Alt	(India) Sai Karteek Reddy Ganta (Japan) R Noguchi	4	1
(United States) V Kirkov (Netherlands) B Stevens	6	6
(India) S Myneni (India) R Ramanathan	5	4
3	(Colombia) C Rodríguez (Australia) MC Romios	7	6
Alt	(South Korea) Y-s Chung (Chinese Taipei) Y-h Hsu	4	3
Alt	(France) A Escoffier (France) B Paire	6	6
(Chinese Taipei) R Ho (Chinese Taipei) C-h Tseng	2	7^{7}	[10]
5	(United Kingdom) D Stevenson (United Kingdom) M Willis	6	6^{5}	[12]

Quarterfinals
WC	(Chinese Taipei) T-l Wu (Chinese Taipei) C-h Yi	7	6^{4}	[9]
(South Korea) J-s Nam (United Kingdom) J Paris	5	7^{7}	[11]
(Japan) T Matsui (Japan) K Uesugi	4	3
PR	(Thailand) P Isaro (India) D Sharan	6	6
(United States) V Kirkov (Netherlands) B Stevens	6	7^{7}
3	(Colombia) C Rodríguez (Australia) MC Romios	2	6^{5}
Alt	(France) A Escoffier (France) B Paire	3	3
5	(United Kingdom) D Stevenson (United Kingdom) M Willis	6	6

Semifinals
(South Korea) J-s Nam (United Kingdom) J Paris	7^{7}	6
PR	(Thailand) P Isaro (India) D Sharan	6^{4}	4
(United States) V Kirkov (Netherlands) B Stevens	4	6^{7}
5	(United Kingdom) D Stevenson (United Kingdom) M Willis	6	7^{9}

Final
(South Korea) J-s Nam (United Kingdom) J Paris	3	3
5	(United Kingdom) D Stevenson (United Kingdom) M Willis	6	6
