= 2024 Taipei OEC Open =

- Date: 21 – 27 October
- Edition: 1st
- Surface: Hard (indoor)
- Location: Taipei, Taiwan

Champions

Singles
- (Japan) Taro Daniel

Doubles
- (United Kingdom) David Stevenson / (United Kingdom) Marcus Willis
Taipei OEC Open	· 2025 →

The 2024 Taipei OEC Open was a professional tennis tournament played on indoor hardcourts. It was the first edition of the tournament which was part of the 2024 ATP Challenger Tour. It took place in Taipei, Taiwan between 21 and 27 October 2024.

== Singles main draw entrants ==
=== Seeds ===
Country	Player	Rank^{1}	Seed
AUS	Aleksandar Vukic	85	1
JPN	Taro Daniel	89	2
AUS	Adam Walton	102	3
TPE	Tseng Chun-hsin	125	4
HKG	Coleman Wong	133	5
USA	Mackenzie McDonald	137	6
JPN	Yasutaka Uchiyama	140	7
TPE	Wu Tung-lin	228	8

- ^{1} Rankings are as of 14 October 2024.

=== Other entrants ===
The following players received wildcards into the singles main draw:

- (South Korea) Chung Hyeon
- (Chinese Taipei) Ray Ho
- (Chinese Taipei) Huang Tsung-hao

The following player received entry into the singles main draw using a protected ranking:

- (Italy) Julian Ocleppo

The following players received entry from the qualifying draw:

- (Thailand) Thanapet Chanta
- (Chinese Taipei) Lee Kuan-yi
- (Malaysia) Mitsuki Wei Kang Leong
- (South Korea) Shin San-hui
- (Japan) Yusuke Takahashi
- (Japan) Kaito Uesugi

== Champions ==
=== Singles ===
- (Japan) Taro Daniel def. (Australia) Adam Walton 6–4, 7–5.

=== Doubles ===
- (United Kingdom) David Stevenson / (United Kingdom) Marcus Willis def. (South Korea) Nam Ji-sung / (United Kingdom) Joshua Paris 6–3, 6–3.
