= 2024 Taipei OEC Open – Singles =

Singles
- 2024 Taipei OEC Open

Final
- Champion: (Japan) Taro Daniel
- Runner-up: (Australia) Adam Walton
- Score: 6–4, 7–5

Events
Singles	Doubles
Taipei OEC Open	· 2025 →

This was the first edition of the tournament.

Taro Daniel won the title after defeating Adam Walton 6–4, 7–5 in the final.

== Seeds ==
1. (Australia) Aleksandar Vukic (semifinals)
2. (Japan) Taro Daniel (champion)
3. (Australia) Adam Walton (final)
4. (Chinese Taipei) Tseng Chun-hsin (semifinals)
5. (Hong Kong) Coleman Wong (quarterfinals)
6. (United States) Mackenzie McDonald (quarterfinals)
7. (Japan) Yasutaka Uchiyama (second round)
8. (Chinese Taipei) Wu Tung-lin (first round)

== Draw ==
Key

- Q = Qualifier
- WC = Wild card
- LL = Lucky loser
- Alt = Alternate
- ITF = ITF entry
- PR = Protected ranking
- SR = Special ranking
- SE = Special exempt
- JE = Junior exempt
- JR = Junior Accelerator Programme entrant
- CO = College Accelerator Programme entrant
- NG = Next Gen Accelerator Program entrant
- w/o = Walkover
- r = Retired
- d = Defaulted

=== Finals ===
Semifinals
1	(Australia) Aleksandar Vukic	3	7	3
3	(Australia) Adam Walton	6	5	6
4	(Chinese Taipei) Tseng Chun-hsin	3	4
2	(Japan) Taro Daniel	6	6

Final
3	(Australia) Adam Walton	4	5
2	(Japan) Taro Daniel	6	7

=== Top half ===
First round
1	(Australia) A Vukic	6	7^{7}
Q	(Japan) Y Takahashi	1	6^{3}
(France) M Janvier	6	6
WC	(Chinese Taipei) R Ho	1	2
Q	(Thailand) Thanapet Chanta	6	2	0
(India) M Sasikumar	2	6	6
WC	(South Korea) H Chung	0	3
7	(Japan) Y Uchiyama	6	6
3	(Australia) A Walton	6	1	6
(France) A Escoffier	4	6	1
PR	(Italy) J Ocleppo	5	4
WC	(Chinese Taipei) T-h Huang	7	6
(India) R Ramanathan	6^{3}	6^{5}
(Japan) K Isomura	7^{7}	7^{7}
Q	(Japan) K Uesugi	2	4
6	(United States) M McDonald	6	6

Second round
1	(Australia) A Vukic	6	3	7^{8}
(France) M Janvier	4	6	6^{6}
(India) M Sasikumar	5	6	7^{7}
7	(Japan) Y Uchiyama	7	3	6^{4}
3	(Australia) A Walton	7	6
WC	(Chinese Taipei) T-h Huang	5	1
(Japan) K Isomura	2	0
6	(United States) M McDonald	6	6

Quarterfinals
1	(Australia) A Vukic	6	6
(India) M Sasikumar	2	2
3	(Australia) A Walton	6	7^{7}
6	(United States) M McDonald	1	6^{0}

Semifinals
1	(Australia) A Vukic	3	7	3
3	(Australia) A Walton	6	5	6

=== Bottom half ===
First round
8	(Chinese Taipei) T-l Wu	4	7^{8}	0
(Venezuela) G Oliveira	6	6^{6}	6
(Chinese Taipei) Y-h Hsu	6	6
(Japan) Y Watanuki	3	4
(Thailand) K Samrej	6^{4}	6	2
(Japan) K Uchida	7^{7}	4	6
(Japan) H Moriya	2	0
4	(Chinese Taipei) C-h Tseng	6	6
5	(Hong Kong) C Wong	6	3	6
Q	(South Korea) Shin San-hui	4	6	1
Q	(Malaysia) Mitsuki Wei Kang Leong	4	6	5
Q	(Chinese Taipei) K-y Lee	6	1	7
(Japan) R Noguchi	5	5
(France) B Paire	7	7
(United States) A Ayeni	6^{5}	3
2	(Japan) T Daniel	7^{7}	6

Second round
(Venezuela) G Oliveira	7^{7}	6^{6}	4
(Chinese Taipei) Y-h Hsu	6^{4}	7^{8}	6
(Japan) K Uchida	7	5	5
4	(Chinese Taipei) C-h Tseng	5	7	7
5	(Hong Kong) C Wong	6	6^{3}	6
Q	(Chinese Taipei) K-y Lee	1	7^{7}	3
(France) B Paire	2	4
2	(Japan) T Daniel	6	6

Quarterfinals
(Chinese Taipei) Y-h Hsu	4	4
4	(Chinese Taipei) C-h Tseng	6	6
5	(Hong Kong) C Wong	4	4
2	(Japan) T Daniel	6	6

Semifinals
4	(Chinese Taipei) C-h Tseng	3	4
2	(Japan) T Daniel	6	6
