= 2023 Maspalomas Challenger – Singles =

Singles
- 2023 Maspalomas Challenger

Final
- Champion: (Spain) Pedro Martínez
- Runner-up: (Switzerland) Kilian Feldbausch
- Score: 6–4, 4–6, 6–3

Events
Singles	Doubles
- Maspalomas Challenger

Dušan Lajović was the defending champion but chose not to defend his title.

Pedro Martínez won the title after defeating Kilian Feldbausch 6–4, 4–6, 6–3 in the final.

== Seeds ==
1. (Spain) Pedro Martínez (champion)
2. (India) Sumit Nagal (second round)
3. (Austria) Filip Misolic (semifinals)
4. Ivan Gakhov (second round)
5. (Spain) Oriol Roca Batalla (first round)
6. (Italy) Raúl Brancaccio (second round)
7. (Spain) Daniel Rincón (semifinals)
8. (Germany) Rudolf Molleker (first round)

== Draw ==
Key

- Q = Qualifier
- WC = Wild card
- LL = Lucky loser
- Alt = Alternate
- ITF = ITF entry
- PR = Protected ranking
- SR = Special ranking
- SE = Special exempt
- JE = Junior exempt
- JR = Junior Accelerator Programme entrant
- CO = College Accelerator Programme entrant
- NG = Next Gen Accelerator Program entrant
- w/o = Walkover
- r = Retired
- d = Defaulted

=== Finals ===
Semifinals
1	(Spain) Pedro Martínez	3	6	6
3	(Austria) Filip Misolic	6	3	4
7	(Spain) Daniel Rincón	3	1
Q	(Switzerland) Kilian Feldbausch	6	6

Final
1	(Spain) Pedro Martínez	6	4	6
Q	(Switzerland) Kilian Feldbausch	4	6	3

=== Top half ===
First round
1	(Spain) P Martínez	6	6
(Romania) ND Ionel	1	2
PR	(Spain) Carlos López Montagud	6	6^{7}	4
Q	(Lithuania) V Gaubas	2	7^{9}	6
Q	Svyatoslav Gulin	6	3
(Bosnia and Herzegovina) N Fatić	4	2^{r}
(Canada) S Diez	4	2
6	(Italy) R Brancaccio	6	6
3	(Austria) F Misolic	6	6
(Germany) H Squire	3	4
(South Korea) G Campaña Lee	4	6	6
(Italy) L Giustino	6	1	3
(Spain) D Jordà Sanchis	6	6
WC	(Spain) C Sánchez Jover	1	3
(Bulgaria) A Andreev	6	7^{7}
5	(Spain) O Roca Batalla	4	6^{3}

Second round
1	(Spain) P Martínez	6	6
Q	(Lithuania) V Gaubas	3	1
Q	S Gulin	7	4	6
6	(Italy) R Brancaccio	5	6	3
3	(Austria) F Misolic	4	6	6
(South Korea) G Campaña Lee	6	4	3
(Spain) D Jordà Sanchis	3	6^{5}
(Bulgaria) A Andreev	6	7^{7}

Quarterfinals
1	(Spain) P Martínez	6	6
Q	S Gulin	4	4
3	(Austria) F Misolic	6	6
(Bulgaria) A Andreev	3	3

Semifinals
1	(Spain) P Martínez	3	6	6
3	(Austria) F Misolic	6	3	4

=== Bottom half ===
First round
7	(Spain) D Rincón	6	7
(Spain) N Sánchez Izquierdo	2	5
(Austria) L Neumayer	3	3
(Germany) Timo Stodder	6	6
WC	(Spain) A Barroso Campos	2	6	4
Q	(Czech Republic) J Forejtek	6	4	6
(Italy) Edoardo Lavagno	5	6^{4}
4	I Gakhov	7	7^{7}
8	(Germany) R Molleker	6	4	2
(Ukraine) O Krutykh	4	6	6
WC	(Spain) N Álvarez Varona	2^{r}
Q	(Switzerland) K Feldbausch	4
Q	(Spain) Imanol López Morillo	7	6
Q	(Spain) J Barranco Cosano	5	4
(Spain) A Moro Cañas	0	2
2	(India) S Nagal	6	6

Second round
7	(Spain) D Rincón	7	6
(Germany) T Stodder	5	3
Q	(Czech Republic) J Forejtek	2	6	6
4	I Gakhov	6	4	3
(Ukraine) O Krutykh	6	3	1
Q	(Switzerland) K Feldbausch	3	6	6
Q	(Spain) I López Morillo	3	6	7
2	(India) S Nagal	6	4	5

Quarterfinals
7	(Spain) D Rincón	3	6	6
Q	(Czech Republic) J Forejtek	6	4	4
Q	(Switzerland) K Feldbausch	6	6
Q	(Spain) I López Morillo	2	2

Semifinals
7	(Spain) D Rincón	3	1
Q	(Switzerland) K Feldbausch	6	6
