= 2022 Maspalomas Challenger =

- Date: 28 November – 4 December
- Edition: 1st
- Surface: Clay
- Location: Maspalomas, Spain

Champions

Singles
- (Serbia) Dušan Lajović

Doubles
- (United States) Evan King / (United States) Reese Stalder
Maspalomas Challenger	· 2023 →

The 2022 Maspalomas Challenger was a professional tennis tournament played on clay courts. It was the first edition of the tournament which was part of the 2022 ATP Challenger Tour. It took place in Maspalomas, Spain from 28 November to 4 December 2022.

== Singles main-draw entrants ==
=== Seeds ===
Country	Player	Rank^{1}	Seed
SRB	Dušan Lajović	102	1
~~GER~~	~~Yannick Hanfmann~~	~~131~~	~~2~~
CZE	Vít Kopřiva	153	3
	Alexander Shevchenko	156	4
BEL	Kimmer Coppejans	199	5
BUL	Adrian Andreev	207	6
CZE	Dalibor Svrčina	226	7
SRB	Miljan Zekić	239	8

- ^{1} Rankings are as of 21 November 2022.

=== Other entrants ===
The following players received wildcards into the singles main draw:

- (Spain) Iñaki Cabrera Bello
- (Spain) Pablo Llamas Ruiz
- (Spain) Alejandro Moro Cañas

The following player received entry into the singles main draw as an alternate:

- (Italy) Edoardo Lavagno

The following players received entry from the qualifying draw:

- Andrey Chepelev
- (Tunisia) Moez Echargui
- (Spain) Imanol López Morillo
- (Italy) Gian Marco Moroni
- (Spain) David Pérez Sanz
- (Ukraine) Eric Vanshelboim

The following player received entry as a lucky loser:

- (Germany) Rudolf Molleker

== Champions ==
=== Singles ===
- (Serbia) Dušan Lajović def. (Canada) Steven Diez 6–1, 6–4.

=== Doubles ===
- (United States) Evan King / (United States) Reese Stalder def. (Italy) Marco Bortolotti / (Spain) Sergio Martos Gornés 6–3, 5–7, [11–9].
