= 2023 Maspalomas Challenger =

- Date: 27 November – 3 December
- Edition: 2nd
- Surface: Clay
- Location: Maspalomas, Spain

Champions

Singles
- (Spain) Pedro Martínez

Doubles
- (United Kingdom) Scott Duncan / (United Kingdom) Marcus Willis
← 2022 ·	Maspalomas Challenger	· 2024 →

The 2023 Maspalomas Challenger was a professional tennis tournament played on clay courts. It was the second edition of the tournament which was part of the 2023 ATP Challenger Tour. It took place in Maspalomas, Spain from 27 November to 3 December 2023.

== Champions ==
=== Singles ===
- (Spain) Pedro Martínez def. (Switzerland) Kilian Feldbausch 6–4, 4–6, 6–3.

=== Doubles ===
- (United Kingdom) Scott Duncan / (United Kingdom) Marcus Willis def. (France) Théo Arribagé / (France) Sadio Doumbia 7–6^{(7–5)}, 6–4.

== Singles main-draw entrants ==
=== Seeds ===
Country	Player	Rank^{1}	Seed
ESP	Pedro Martínez	114	1
IND	Sumit Nagal	141	2
AUT	Filip Misolic	158	3
	Ivan Gakhov	172	4
ESP	Oriol Roca Batalla	189	5
ITA	Raúl Brancaccio	195	6
ESP	Daniel Rincón	196	7
GER	Rudolf Molleker	198	8

- ^{1} Rankings are as of 20 November 2023.

=== Other entrants ===
The following players received wildcards into the singles main draw:

- (Spain) Nicolás Álvarez Varona
- (Spain) Alberto Barroso Campos
- (Spain) Carlos Sánchez Jover

The following player received entry into the singles main draw using a protected ranking:

- (Spain) Carlos López Montagud

The following players received entry from the qualifying draw:

- (Spain) Javier Barranco Cosano
- (Switzerland) Kilian Feldbausch
- (Czech Republic) Jonáš Forejtek
- (Lithuania) Vilius Gaubas
- Svyatoslav Gulin
- (Spain) Imanol López Morillo
