= 2023 Cary Challenger =

- Date: 7–13 August
- Edition: 10th
- Surface: Hard
- Location: Cary, North Carolina, United States

Champions

Singles
- (Australia) Adam Walton

Doubles
- (United States) Evan King / (United States) Reese Stalder
- Cary Challenger

The 2023 Cary Challenger was a professional tennis tournament being played on hard courts. It was the 10th edition of the tournament which was part of the 2023 ATP Challenger Tour. It took place in Cary, North Carolina, United States between 7 and 13 August 2023.

== Singles main-draw entrants ==
=== Seeds ===
Country	Player	Rank^{1}	Seed
	Alexander Shevchenko	93	1
AUS	Rinky Hijikata	110	2
GBR	Liam Broady	125	3
USA	Nicolas Moreno de Alboran	137	4
FRA	Arthur Cazaux	138	5
NED	Gijs Brouwer	144	6
ECU	Emilio Gómez	155	7
SUI	Leandro Riedi	159	8

- ^{1} Rankings are as of July 31, 2023.

=== Other entrants ===
The following players received wildcards into the singles main draw:

- (Australia) Rinky Hijikata
- (United States) Patrick Kypson
- (United States) Ethan Quinn

The following players received entry into the singles main draw as alternates:

- (United States) Bjorn Fratangelo
- (United Kingdom) Ryan Peniston

The following players received entry from the qualifying draw:

- (United States) Stefan Dostanic
- (Australia) Blake Ellis
- (United Kingdom) Billy Harris
- (United States) Karl Poling
- (United States) Keegan Smith
- (United States) Quinn Vandecasteele

The following player received entry as a lucky loser:

- (Japan) Yuki Mochizuki

== Champions ==
=== Singles ===
- (Australia) Adam Walton def. (United States) Nicolas Moreno de Alboran 6–4, 3–6, 7–5.

=== Doubles ===
- (United States) Evan King / (United States) Reese Stalder def. (Latvia) Miķelis Lībietis / (Australia) Adam Walton 6–3, 7–6^{(7–4)}.
