= 2023 Cary Challenger – Doubles =

Doubles
- 2023 Cary Challenger

Final
- Champions: (United States) Evan King (United States) Reese Stalder
- Runners-up: (Latvia) Miķelis Lībietis (Australia) Adam Walton
- Score: 6–3, 7–6^{(7–4)}

Events
Singles	Doubles
← 2022 ·	Cary Challenger	· 2023 →

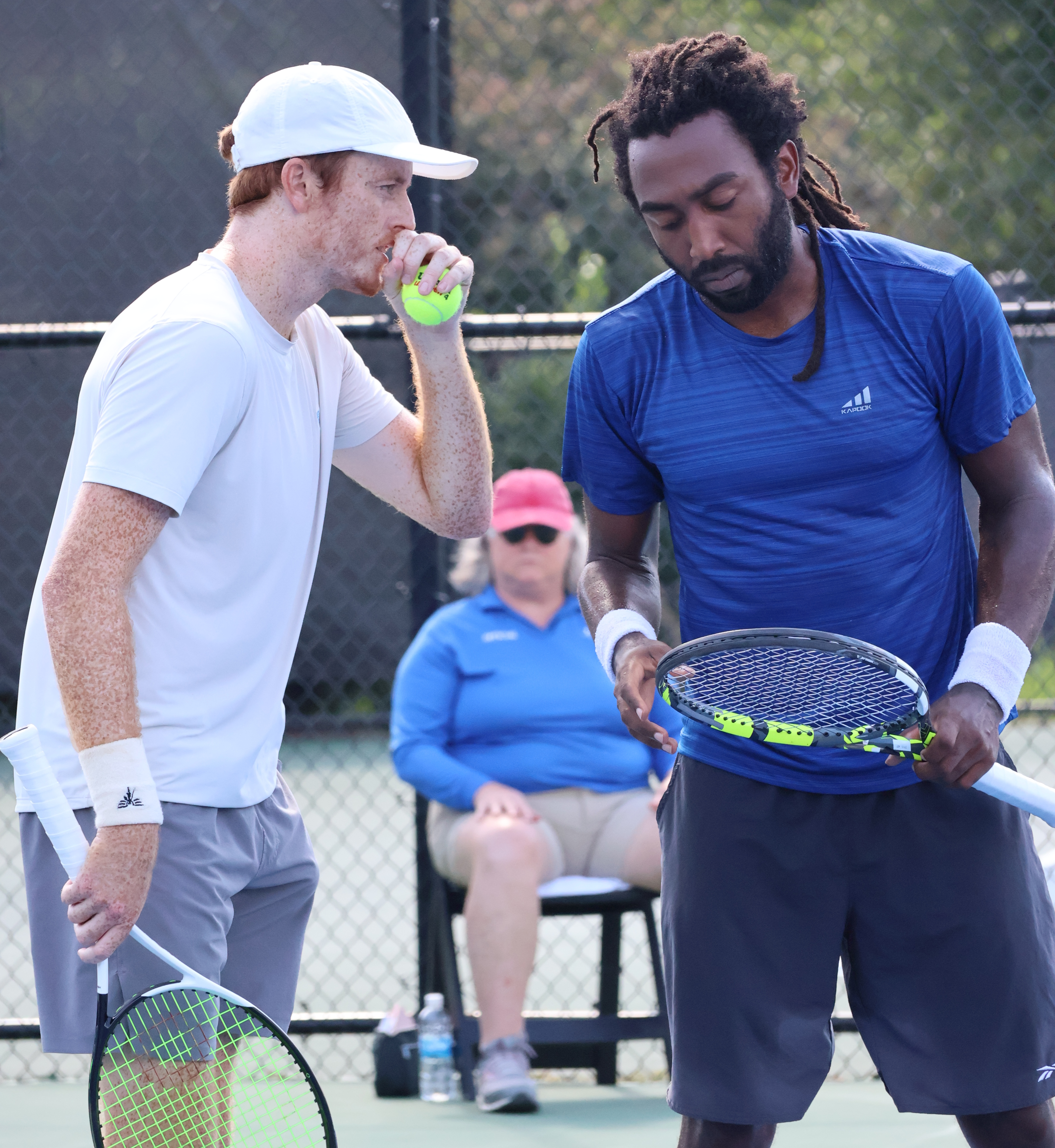
Reese Stalder and Evan King (pictured in the second round) won the title.

Nathaniel Lammons and Jackson Withrow were the defending champions but chose not to defend their title.

Evan King and Reese Stalder won the title after defeating Miķelis Lībietis and Adam Walton 6–3, 7–6^{(7–4)} in the final.

== Seeds ==
1. (United States) Evan King / (United States) Reese Stalder (champions)
2. (Finland) Patrik Niklas-Salminen / (Netherlands) Bart Stevens (first round)
3. (United Kingdom) Luke Johnson / (United Kingdom) Henry Patten (quarterfinals)
4. (Greece) Michail Pervolarakis / (Greece) Petros Tsitsipas (first round)

== Draw ==
=== Key ===
- Q = Qualifier
- WC = Wild card
- LL = Lucky loser
- Alt = Alternate
- ITF = ITF entry
- PR = Protected ranking
- SR = Special ranking
- SE = Special exempt
- JE = Junior exempt
- JR = Junior Accelerator Programme entrant
- CO = College Accelerator Programme entrant
- NG = Next Gen Accelerator Program entrant
- w/o = Walkover
- r = Retired
- d = Defaulted

First round
1	(United States) E King (United States) R Stalder	6^{7}	7	[10]
WC	(Netherlands) Fons van Sambeek (United States) Joseph Wayand	7^{9}	5	[7]
(United Kingdom) B Harris (United Kingdom) R Peniston	1	2
(Australia) R Hijikata (United States) M Kiger	6	6
3	(United Kingdom) L Johnson (United Kingdom) H Patten	6	7^{7}
(Netherlands) G Brouwer (United States) N Moreno de Alboran	1	6^{3}
(Switzerland) L Riedi (Switzerland) A Ritschard	6	7
(South Korea) S-c Hong (Japan) S Shimabukuro	3	5
(Latvia) M Lībietis (Australia) A Walton	6	6
(United States) H Reese (New Zealand) A Sitak	4	4
(Australia) B Ellis (Australia) C Puttergill	6	4	[10]
4	(Greece) M Pervolarakis (Greece) Pe Tsitsipas	4	6	[5]
(India) P Raja (India) R Ramanathan	6	6
(United Kingdom) S Duncan (United States) A Lawson	4	4
WC	(United States) Casey Kania (United States) B Kittay	6	6
2	(Finland) P Niklas-Salminen (Netherlands) B Stevens	1	2

Quarterfinals
1	(United States) E King (United States) R Stalder	6	6
(Australia) R Hijikata (United States) M Kiger	4	4
3	(United Kingdom) L Johnson (United Kingdom) H Patten	5	6	[6]
(Switzerland) L Riedi (Switzerland) A Ritschard	7	4	[10]
(Latvia) M Lībietis (Australia) A Walton	2	7	[10]
(Australia) B Ellis (Australia) C Puttergill	6	5	[4]
(India) P Raja (India) R Ramanathan	6	7^{7}
WC	(United States) C Kania (United States) B Kittay	4	6^{2}

Semifinals
1	(United States) E King (United States) R Stalder	6	3	[10]
(Switzerland) L Riedi (Switzerland) A Ritschard	2	6	[6]
(Latvia) M Lībietis (Australia) A Walton	6	6
(India) P Raja (India) R Ramanathan	3	0

Final
1	(United States) E King (United States) R Stalder	6	7^{7}
(Latvia) M Lībietis (Australia) A Walton	3	6^{4}
