= Touchtennis =

Modified version of tennis played on a compact court with foam balls and shorter rackets

touchtennis
- First played: 2002, London, UK

Characteristics
- Contact: No
- Team members: Single or doubles
- Mixed-sex: Yes, separate singles and doubles & mixed doubles
- Type: racket sport
- Equipment: Touchtennis ball, 21 in (53 cm) tennis rackets
- Venue: Indoor or outdoor 12 m × 6 m (39 ft × 20 ft) court with a tennis net

Presence
- Country or region: UK, United States, Canada, Australia, Spain, Brazil, France, Belgium, New Zealand, Singapore, Serbia
- Olympic: No
- Paralympic: No

Touchtennis is a modified version of tennis played on a compact court with foam balls and shorter (21-inch or 53-centimetre) rackets. It is regularly featured on Sky Sports and is growing in popularity and acceptance as an alternative form of the full size game.

Former and current ATP Players include Fernando Gonzalez, Marcus Willis, Jeff Tarango and Chris Eaton. TV personality Bear Grylls plays tournaments and is a vocal supporter as is comedian Miranda Hart.

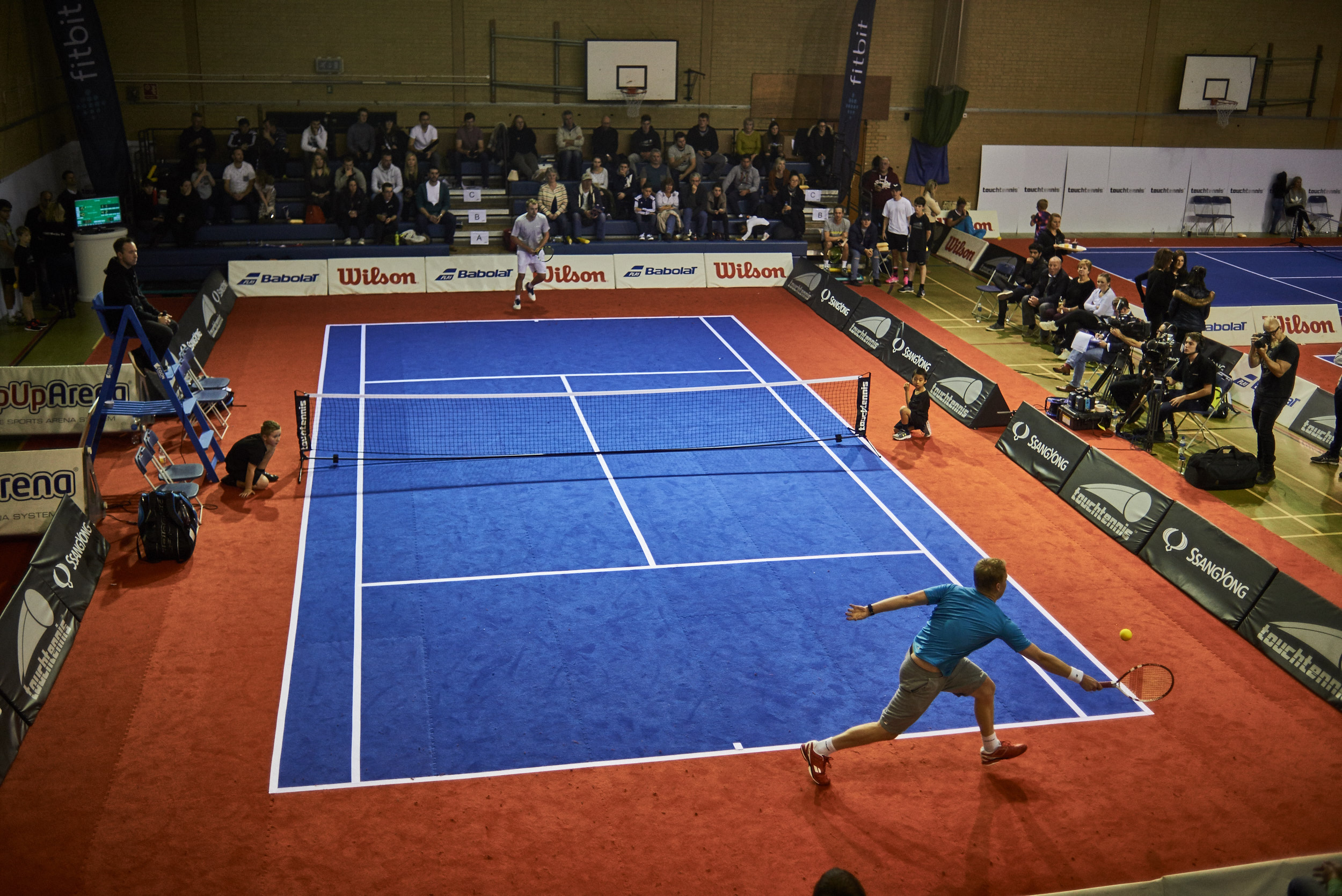
A touchtennis tournament in London 2016

It is also used as a tool by the Lawn Tennis Association in the United Kingdom and the RFET in Spain to increase the number of people playing an adaptation of tennis.

== History ==
Touchtennis was created by Rashid Ahmad as a means of entertaining his young daughter in the back garden. It was developed to include a tour, complete with rankings, 4 major Grand Slams as well as Masters events and other smaller tournaments that offer a lower value of ranking points.

== Equipment ==
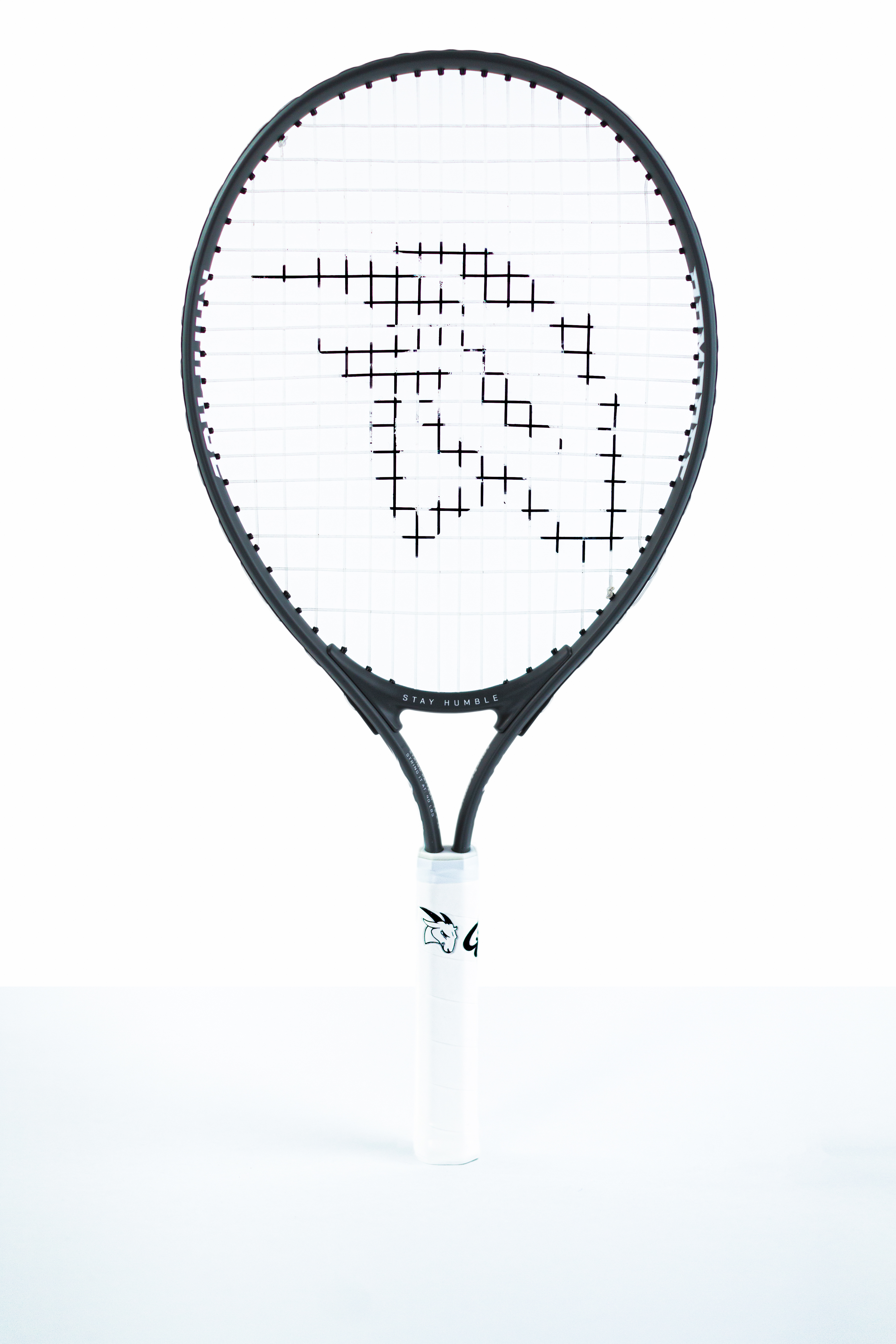
The only certified touchtennis racket

=== Rackets ===
Official touchtennis rackets must be no shorter than 20.9 inches (53.1 cm) and no longer than 21.1 inches (53.6 cm). The racket's head size may be no greater than 107 square inches (690 cm^{2}).

=== Balls ===
Special foam balls have been developed to withstand heavy hitting. The official ball of touchtennis is 8 cm (3.1 in) in diameter and made from white cut foam.

== Court ==
The dimensions of an official touchtennis court are 12 m × 5 m (39 ft × 16 ft) for singles and 12 m × 6 m (39 ft × 20 ft) for doubles. However, variances of up to 25cm are tolerated on all lines in order to make the game more accessible and varied. Players can also utilize a badminton court by lowering the net and taping a new service line 2 metres (6 ft 7 in) away from the badminton service line towards the baseline.
