= 2023 Cary Challenger – Singles =

Singles
- 2023 Cary Challenger

Final
- Champion: (Australia) Adam Walton
- Runner-up: (United States) Nicolas Moreno de Alboran
- Score: 6–4, 3–6, 7–5

Events
Singles	Doubles
- Cary Challenger

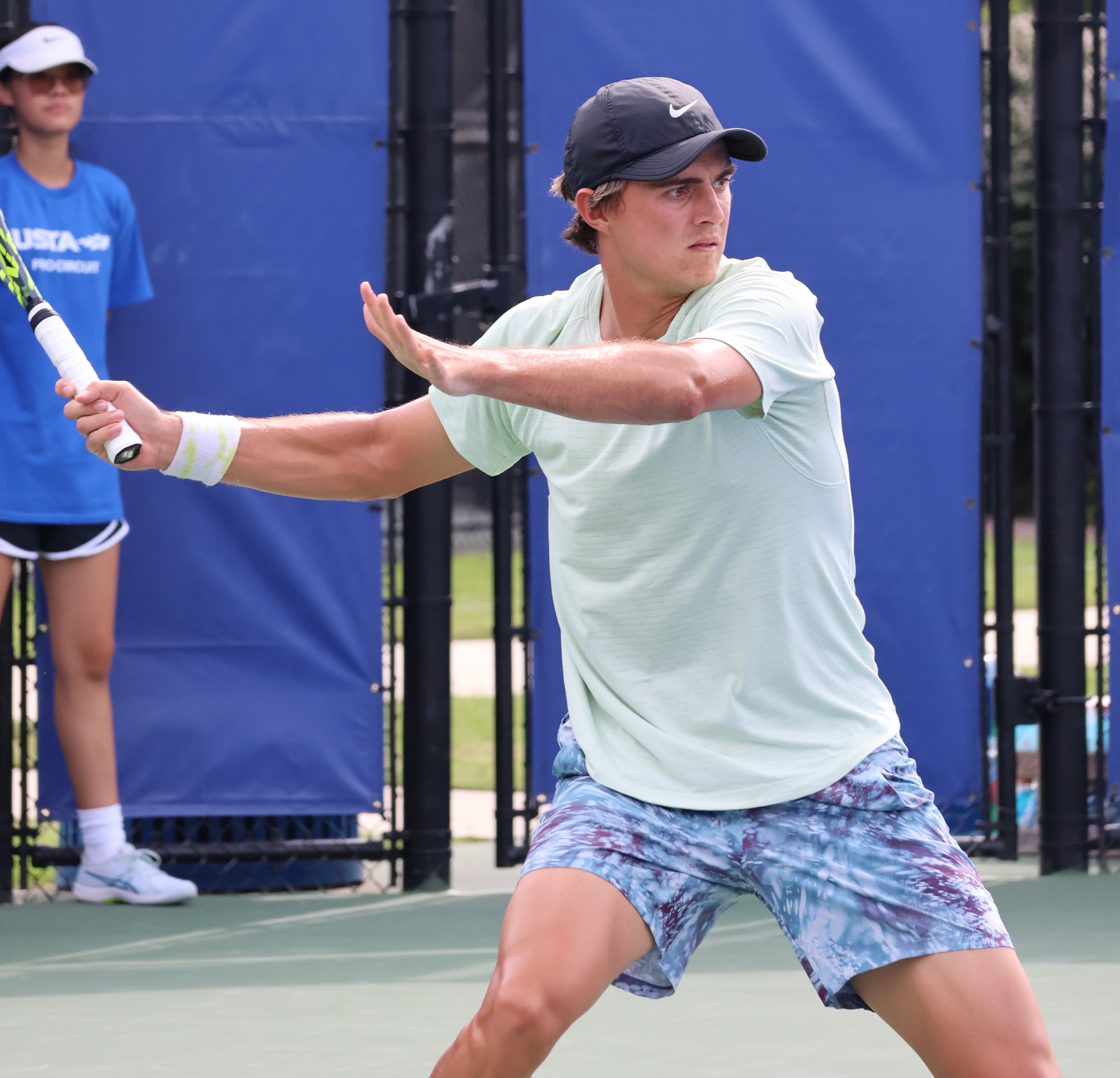
Adam Walton (pictured in the first round) won the title.

Michael Mmoh was the defending champion but chose not to defend his title.

Adam Walton won the title after defeating Nicolas Moreno de Alboran 6–4, 3–6, 7–5 in the final.

== Seeds ==
1. Alexander Shevchenko (first round)
2. (Australia) Rinky Hijikata (quarterfinals)
3. (United Kingdom) Liam Broady (semifinals)
4. (United States) Nicolas Moreno de Alboran (final)
5. (France) Arthur Cazaux (second round)
6. (Netherlands) Gijs Brouwer (second round)
7. (Ecuador) Emilio Gómez (first round)
8. (Switzerland) Leandro Riedi (first round)

== Draw ==
Key

- Q = Qualifier
- WC = Wild card
- LL = Lucky loser
- Alt = Alternate
- ITF = ITF entry
- PR = Protected ranking
- SR = Special ranking
- SE = Special exempt
- JE = Junior exempt
- JR = Junior Accelerator Programme entrant
- CO = College Accelerator Programme entrant
- NG = Next Gen Accelerator Program entrant
- w/o = Walkover
- r = Retired
- d = Defaulted

=== Finals ===
Semifinals
WC	(United States) Patrick Kypson	7^{12}	3	1
4	(United States) Nicolas Moreno de Alboran	6^{10}	6	6
3	(United Kingdom) Liam Broady	4	5
(Australia) Adam Walton	6	7

Final
4	(United States) Nicolas Moreno de Alboran	4	6	5
(Australia) Adam Walton	6	3	7

=== Top half ===
First round
1	A Shevchenko	6	3	6^{4}
(South Korea) S-c Hong	3	6	7^{7}
Q	(United States) K Smith	3	2
WC	(United States) P Kypson	6	6
(Chinese Taipei) T-l Wu	4	6	6
LL	(Japan) Yuki Mochizuki	6	3	2
(Paraguay) AD Vallejo	6	6
8	(Switzerland) L Riedi	3	4
4	(United States) N Moreno de Alboran	6	7
Q	(United States) Q Vandecasteele	3	5
Q	(United States) S Dostanic	7^{7}	6
(United States) Z Svajda	6^{5}	3
Q	(United States) K Poling	2	6	5
Alt	(United Kingdom) R Peniston	6	1	7
WC	(United States) E Quinn	7^{7}	3	1
6	(Netherlands) G Brouwer	6^{2}	6	6

Second round
(South Korea) S-c Hong	4	4
WC	(United States) P Kypson	6	6
(Chinese Taipei) T-l Wu	6	3	6
(Paraguay) AD Vallejo	1	6	1
4	(United States) N Moreno de Alboran	6	7^{7}
Q	(United States) S Dostanic	2	6^{5}
Alt	(United Kingdom) R Peniston	5	7	6
6	(Netherlands) G Brouwer	7	5	2

Quarterfinals
WC	(United States) P Kypson	6	7^{7}
(Chinese Taipei) T-l Wu	3	6^{4}
4	(United States) N Moreno de Alboran	6	6
Alt	(United Kingdom) R Peniston	3	4

Semifinals
WC	(United States) P Kypson	7^{12}	3	1
4	(United States) N Moreno de Alboran	6^{10}	6	6

=== Bottom half ===
First round
5	(France) A Cazaux	6	6
(Jordan) A Shelbayh	3	0
(Japan) S Mochizuki	7^{7}	3	2
(South Africa) L Harris	6^{4}	6	6
(United States) T Sandgren	3	6	3
Q	(Australia) B Ellis	6	1	6
(United States) E Spizzirri	2	2
3	(United Kingdom) L Broady	6	6
7	(Ecuador) E Gómez	5	6^{5}
Q	(United Kingdom) B Harris	7	7^{7}
(Kazakhstan) B Zhukayev	4	3
(Australia) A Walton	6	6
Alt	(United States) B Fratangelo	3	6	2
(Switzerland) A Ritschard	6	4	6
(Japan) S Shimabukuro	3	2
2/WC	(Australia) R Hijikata	6	6

Second round
5	(France) A Cazaux	4	6^{4}
(South Africa) L Harris	6	7^{7}
Q	(Australia) B Ellis	3	3
3	(United Kingdom) L Broady	6	6
Q	(United Kingdom) B Harris	6	6^{7}	6^{3}
(Australia) A Walton	3	7^{9}	7^{7}
(Switzerland) A Ritschard	6^{4}	3
2/WC	(Australia) R Hijikata	7^{7}	6

Quarterfinals
(South Africa) L Harris	3	4
3	(United Kingdom) L Broady	6	6
(Australia) A Walton	6	6
2/WC	(Australia) R Hijikata	2	4

Semifinals
3	(United Kingdom) L Broady	4	5
(Australia) A Walton	6	7
