= Taipei OEC Open =

Defunct tennis tournament
- Location: Taipei, Taiwan
- Venue: Taipei Arena
- Category: ATP Challenger Tour 125 (2024)
- Surface: Hard (indoor)
- Prize money: $164,000 (2024)
- Website: Website

The Taipei OEC Open was a professional tennis tournament played on indoor hardcourts. It was part of the ATP Challenger Tour. It was held in Taipei, Taiwan in 2024 as a Challenger 125.

== Past finals ==
=== Singles ===
Year	Champion	Runner-up	Score
2024	(Japan) Taro Daniel	(Australia) Adam Walton	6–4, 7–5

=== Doubles ===
Year	Champions	Runners-up	Score
2024	(United Kingdom) David Stevenson (United Kingdom) Marcus Willis	(South Korea) Nam Ji-sung (United Kingdom) Joshua Paris	6–3, 6–3
