= Adam Walton =

Australian tennis player (born 1999)

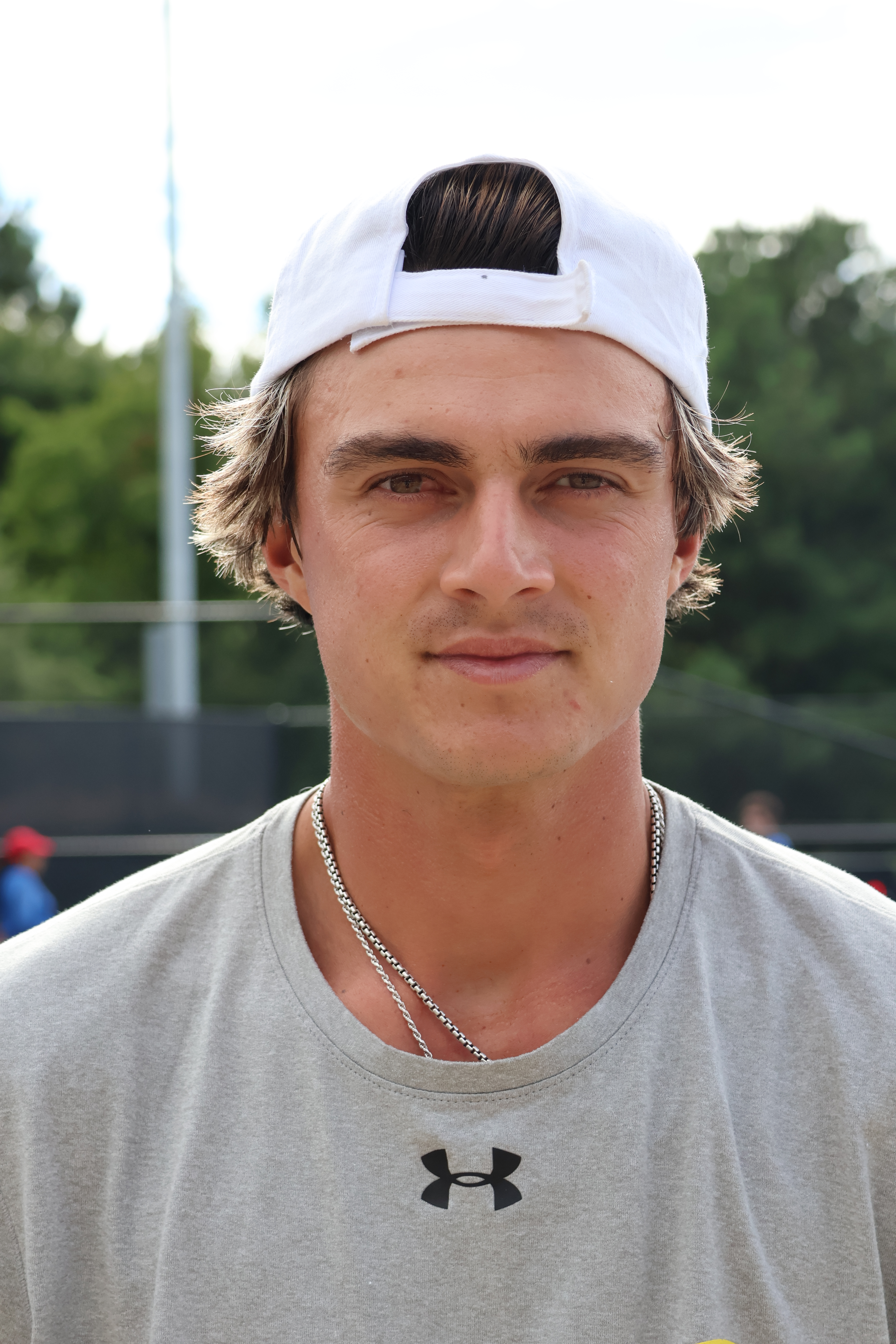
- Walton at the 2023 Cary Challenger
- Country (sports): Australia
- Born: 17 April 1999 (age 27) Home Hill, Queensland, Australia
- Height: 1.83 m (6 ft 0 in)
- Turned pro: 2022
- Plays: Right-handed (two-handed backhand)
- College: Tennessee
- Coach: Mark Draper
- Prize money: US $2,689,226

Singles
- Career record: 25–49
- Career titles: 0
- Highest ranking: No. 74 (20 October 2025)
- Current ranking: No. 96 (9 November 2026)

Grand Slam singles results
- Australian Open: 1R (2024, 2025, 2026)
- French Open: 2R (2025, 2026)
- Wimbledon: 2R (2024)
- US Open: 2R (2025)

Doubles
- Career record: 7–12
- Career titles: 0
- Highest ranking: No. 134 (18 March 2024)
- Current ranking: No. 684 (28 September 2026)

Grand Slam doubles results
- Australian Open: 2R (2025)
- Wimbledon: 1R (2025)
- US Open: 1R (2025, 2026)

Grand Slam mixed doubles results
- Australian Open: 1R (2024)
- Last updated on: 28 September 2026.

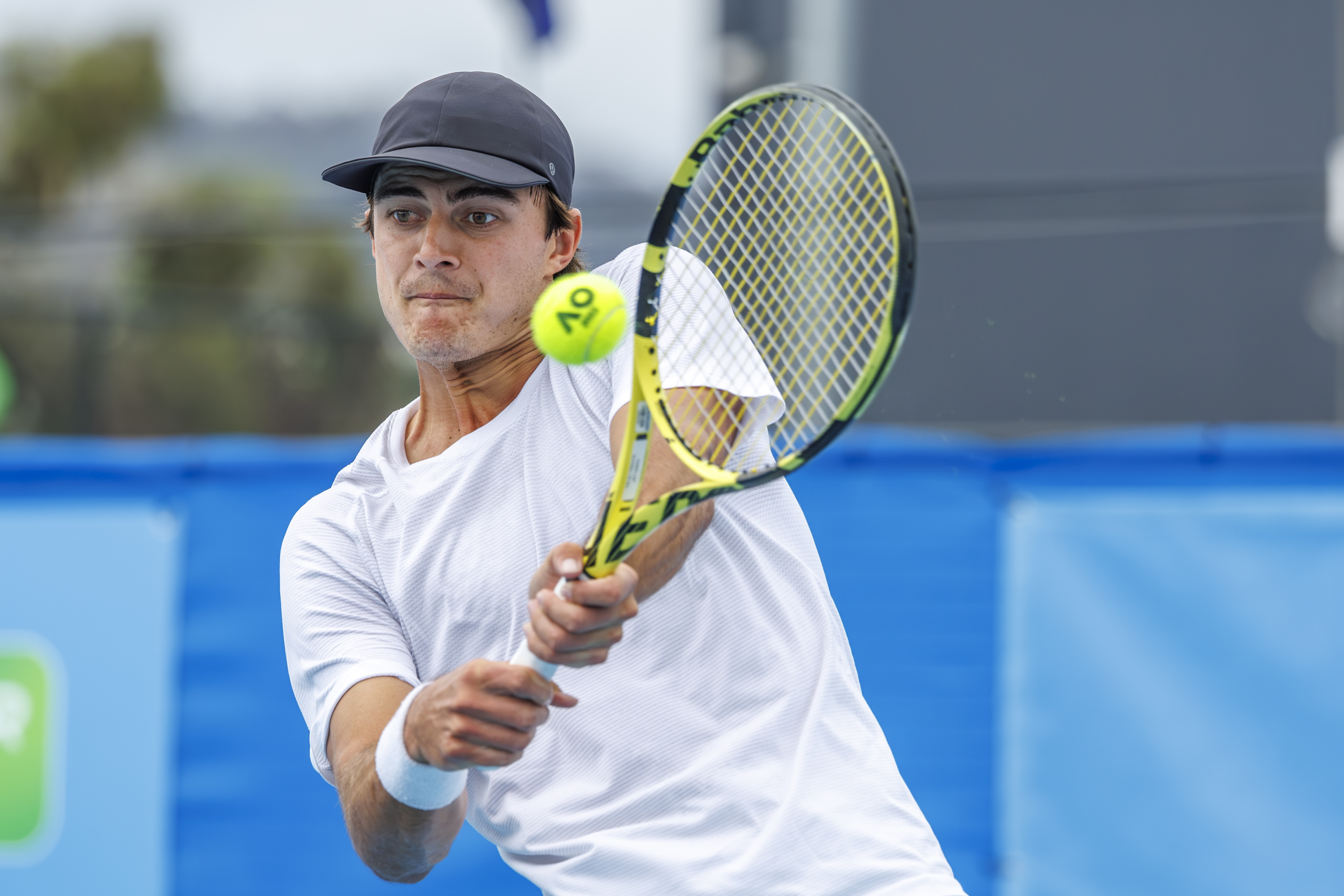
Canberra- 1 January 2023 - Australia's Adam Walton (WC)- in a round one qualifying match at the Canberra International ATP 100 Challenger tournament.

Adam Walton (born 17 April 1999) is an Australian professional tennis player. Walton has a career-high ATP singles ranking of world no. 74 achieved on 20 October 2025. He also has a career-high ATP doubles ranking of no. 134 achieved on 18 March 2024. He has won five singles and four doubles titles on the ATP Challenger Tour.

== Early life ==
Walton was born and raised in Home Hill, a small rural town in North Queensland. He began playing tennis at five years old and moved to Brisbane at 14 when he received a tennis scholarship to attend Anglican Church Grammar School for the final three years of his schooling. The move allowed him to begin training in the National Academy at the Queensland Tennis Centre.

== College career ==
Walton played college tennis at the University of Tennessee, where he won the 2021 NCAA doubles title with Patrick Harper.

== Professional career ==
=== 2023: First Challenger title ===
Walton won his maiden ATP Challenger doubles title at the San Luis Open Challenger with Colin Sinclair. He won his first singles Challenger in August at the Atlantic Tire Championships in Cary, North Carolina.

=== 2024: Major debut, top-100 ===
For his Grand Slam main-draw debut, he received a wildcard for the Australian Open, but lost to Matteo Arnaldi in the first round.

Ranked No. 150, he qualified for the Miami Open making his Masters debut, losing in the first round to Félix Auger-Aliassime.

Following his third singles title at the Taipei Challenger, with a win over Illya Marchenko he reached the top-100 at world No. 95 on 20 May 2024.

Walton received a wildcard entry for the French Open, but lost to Arthur Rinderknech in the first round. He recorded his first ATP main-draw win at the Mallorca Championships defeating Yannick Hanfmann,before losing to Paul Jubb in the second round.

He qualified Wimbledon making his debut and recorded his first Major win over Federico Coria, before losing to Francisco Comesaña in the second round.

=== 2025: Miami fourth round, first ATP semifinal ===
At the Australian Open, where he gained direct entry into the main-draw due to his ranking, Walton lost in the first round to Quentin Halys in five sets.

In March at the Indian Wells Open, he defeated Giulio Zeppieri for first at the Masters-level win, before losing to 27th seed Denis Shapovalov in the second round.

At the Miami Open, where he entered the main-draw as a lucky loser directly into the second round, replacing Hubert Hurkacz after his late withdrawal, Walton defeated Luciano Darderi and wildcard entrant Coleman Wong to reach his first Masters fourth round, at which point he lost to third seed Taylor Fritz.

In July, Walton reached his first ATP Tour semifinal at the 2025 Los Cabos Open. He lost to third seed Denis Shapovalov in the semifinal.

At the Cincinnati Open, he defeated qualifier Mariano Navone and 12th seed Daniil Medvedev to make it into the third round, where his run was ended by 22nd seed Jiří Lehečka.

=== 2026: Two Masters second rounds ===
At the Australian Open, Walton lost to world No. 1 and eventual champion Carlos Alcaraz in the first round.

In March, reached back-to-back Masters' tournament second rounds at Indian Wells, where he defeated Quentin Halysand before losing to 25th seed Learner Tien, followed by the Miami Open, where he qualified and overcame Sebastián Báez and then lost to 12th seed Jakub Menšík.

Given a wildcard entry into the main-draw at the French Open, Walton defeated sixth seed Daniil Medvedev in the first round for his maiden win over a top 10 ranked player. He lost to Zachary Svajda in the second round.

== ATP Challenger and ITF Tour finals ==
=== Singles: 20 (10 titles, 10 runner-ups) ===
| Legend (singles) ATP Challenger Tour (5–7) Futures/ITF World Tennis Tour (5–3) | Finals by surface Hard (10–9) Clay (0–0) Grass (0–1) |

| Result | W–L | Date | Tournament | Tier | Surface | Opponent | Score |
|---|---|---|---|---|---|---|---|
| Loss | 0–1 | Sep 2019 | M15 Champaign, USA | World Tour | Hard | (Argentina) Axel Geller | 3–6, 6–4, 3–6 |
| Win | 1–1 | Jul 2022 | M15 Waco, USA | World Tour | Hard | (Australia) Li Tu | 7–5, 0–6, 6–1 |
| Win | 2–1 | Jul 2022 | M15 Cancún, Mexico | World Tour | Hard | (Brazil) Fernando Yamacita | 6–4, 6–1 |
| Loss | 2–2 | Aug 2022 | M15 Cancún, Mexico | World Tour | Hard | (Peru) Jorge Panta | 6–1, 3–6, 4–6 |
| Win | 3–2 | Aug 2022 | M15 Cancún, Mexico | World Tour | Hard | (Ecuador) Andrés Andrade | 7–6^{(7–3)}, 2–6, 6–3 |
| Loss | 3–3 | Feb 2023 | M25 Santo Domingo, Dominican Republic | World Tour | Hard | (Australia) Alex Bolt | 6–4, 1–6, 6–7^{(5–7)} |
| Win | 4–3 | May 2023 | M15 Tbilisi, Georgia | World Tour | Hard | (Israel) Orel Kimhi | 6–1, 6–2 |
| Win | 5–3 | Jun 2023 | M25 Tulsa, USA | World Tour | Hard | (United States) Nick Chappell | 6–1, 6–3 |
| Win | 6–3 | Aug 2023 | Cary 1, USA | Challenger | Hard | (United States) Nicolas Moreno de Alboran | 6–4, 3–6, 7–5 |
| Loss | 6–4 | Oct 2023 | Tiburon, USA | Challenger | Hard | (United States) Zachary Svajda | 2–6, 2–6 |
| Win | 7–4 | Feb 2024 | Burnie, Australia | Challenger | Hard | (Australia) Dane Sweeny | 6–2, 7–6^{(7–4)} |
| Loss | 7–5 | Feb 2024 | Pune, India | Challenger | Hard | (Monaco) Valentin Vacherot | 6–3, 6–7^{(5–7)}, 6–7^{(5–7)} |
| Loss | 7–6 | Apr 2024 | Acapulco, Mexico | Challenger | Hard | (France) Giovanni Mpetshi Perricard | 3–6, 3–6 |
| Loss | 7–7 | May 2024 | Guangzhou, China | Challenger | Hard | (Australia) Tristan Schoolkate | 3–6, 6–3, 3–6 |
| Win | 8–7 | May 2024 | Santaizi, Taiwan | Challenger | Hard | (Ukraine) Illya Marchenko | 3–6, 6–2, 7–6^{(7–3)} |
| Loss | 8–8 | Oct 2024 | Taipei, Taiwan | Challenger | Hard | (Japan) Taro Daniel | 4–6, 5–7 |
| Win | 9–8 | Feb 2025 | Brisbane, Australia | Challenger | Hard | (Australia) Jason Kubler | 7–6^{(8–6)}, 7–6^{(7–4)} |
| Loss | 9–9 | May 2026 | Jiujiang, China | Challenger | Hard | (Hong Kong) Coleman Wong | 5–7, 6–7^{(4–7)} |
| Win | 10–9 | Jun 2026 | Tyler, USA | Challenger | Hard | (United States) Andre Ilagan | 7–5, 6–1 |
| Loss | 10–10 | Jul 2026 | Newport, USA | Challenger | Grass | (United Kingdom) Jacob Fearnley | 7–5, 6–7^{(8–10)}, 4–6 |

=== Doubles: 14 (5 titles, 9 runner-ups) ===
| Legend (doubles) ATP Challenger Tour (4–4) Futures/ITF World Tennis Tour (1–5) | Finals by surface Hard (4–8) Clay (1–1) |

| Result | W–L | Date | Tournament | Tier | Surface | Partner | Opponents | Score |
|---|---|---|---|---|---|---|---|---|
| Loss | 0–1 | Aug 2022 | M15 Cancún, Mexico | World Tour | Hard | (United States) Tyler Zink | (Japan) Taisei Ichikawa (Japan) Seita Watanabe | 6–1, 6–7^{(9–11)}, [8–10] |
| Win | 1–1 | Aug 2022 | M15 Cancún, Mexico | World Tour | Hard | (United States) Andrew Rogers | (United Kingdom) Blu Baker (Japan) Kosuke Ogura | 6–2, 6–2 |
| Loss | 1–2 | Sep 2022 | M25 Darwin, Australia | World Tour | Hard | (Australia) Joshua Charlton | (Australia) Calum Puttergill (Australia) Dane Sweeny | 6–7^{(5–7)}, 3–6 |
| Loss | 1–3 | Oct 2022 | M25 Cairns, Australia | World Tour | Hard | (Australia) James McCabe | (Northern Mariana Islands) Colin Sinclair (United States) Kyle Seelig | 4–6, 2–6 |
| Loss | 1–4 | Feb 2023 | M25 Burnie, Australia | World Tour | Hard | (Australia) Calum Puttergill | (Australia) Tristan Schoolkate (Australia) Luke Saville | 5–7, 4–6 |
| Loss | 1–5 | Feb 2023 | M25 Santo Domingo, Dominican Republic | World Tour | Hard | (United States) Ezekiel Clark | (Peru) Arklon Huertas del Pino (Peru) Conner Huertas del Pino | 4–6, 3–6 |
| Win | 2–5 | Apr 2023 | San Luis, Mexico | Challenger | Clay | (Northern Mariana Islands) Colin Sinclair | (Zimbabwe) Benjamin Lock (New Zealand) Rubin Statham | 5–7, 6–3, [10–5] |
| Win | 3–5 | Jul 2023 | Bloomfield Hills, USA | Challenger | Hard | (Australia) Tristan Schoolkate | (Australia) Blake Ellis (Australia) Calum Puttergill | 7–5, 6–3 |
| Loss | 3–6 | Jul 2023 | Granby, Canada | Challenger | Hard | (Australia) Tristan Schoolkate | (United States) Christian Harrison (Latvia) Miķelis Lībietis | 4–6, 3–6 |
| Loss | 3–7 | Aug 2023 | Cary 1, USA | Challenger | Hard | (Latvia) Miķelis Lībietis | (United States) Evan King (United States) Reese Stalder | 3–6, 6–7^{(4–7)} |
| Loss | 3–8 | Jan 2024 | Burnie, Australia | Challenger | Hard | (Australia) Tristan Schoolkate | (Australia) Alex Bolt (Australia) Luke Saville | 7–5, 3–6, [10–12] |
| Win | 4–8 | Feb 2024 | Pune, India | Challenger | Hard | (Australia) Tristan Schoolkate | (France) Dan Added (South Korea) Chung Yun-seong | 7–6^{(7–4)}, 7–5 |
| Loss | 4–9 | Mar 2024 | Mexico City, Mexico | Challenger | Clay | (Australia) Tristan Schoolkate | (United States) Ryan Seggerman (United States) Patrik Trhac | 7–5, 4–6, [5–10] |
| Win | 5–9 | Sep 2024 | Nonthaburi, Thailand | Challenger | Hard | (Australia) Blake Ellis | (India) Rithvik Choudary Bollipalli (India) Arjun Kadhe | 3–6, 7–5, [10–8] |

== Performance timelines ==
Key
| W | F | SF | QF | #R | RR | Q# | DNQ | A | NH |

(W) winner; (F) finalist; (SF) semifinalist; (QF) quarterfinalist; (#R) rounds 4, 3, 2, 1; (RR) round-robin stage; (Q#) qualification round; (DNQ) did not qualify; (A) absent; (NH) not held; (SR) strike rate (events won / competed); (W–L) win–loss record.
To avoid confusion and double counting, these charts are updated at the conclusion of a tournament or when the player's participation has ended.

=== Singles ===
| Tournament | 2023 | 2024 | 2025 | 2026 | SR | W–L |
|---|---|---|---|---|---|---|
Grand Slam tournaments
| Australian Open | Q2 | 1R | 1R | 1R | 0 / 3 | 0–3 |
| French Open | A | 1R | 2R | 2R | 0 / 3 | 2–3 |
| Wimbledon | A | 2R | 1R | 1R | 0 / 3 | 1–3 |
| US Open | A | 1R | 2R | 1R | 0 / 2 | 1–3 |
| Win–loss | 0–0 | 1–4 | 2–4 | 1–4 | 0 / 12 | 4–12 |
ATP Tour Masters 1000
| Indian Wells | A | Q1 | 2R | 2R | 0 / 2 | 2–2 |
| Miami Open | A | 1R | 4R | 2R | 0 / 3 | 3–3 |
| Monte-Carlo | A | A | A | 2R | 0 / 1 | 1–1 |
| Madrid Open | A | A | A | A | 0 / 0 | 0–0 |
| Italian Open | A | A | A | A | 0 / 0 | 0–0 |
| Canadian Open | A | Q1 | 2R | 1R | 0 / 2 | 1–2 |
| Cincinnati Open | A | A | 3R | 3R | 0 / 2 | 4–2 |
| Shanghai Masters | A | Q2 | 1R | | 0 / 1 | 0–1 |
| Paris Masters | A | A | Q1 | | 0 / 0 | 0–0 |
| Win–loss | 0–0 | 0–1 | 6–5 | 5–5 | 0 / 11 | 11–11 |
Career statistics
| | 2023 | 2024 | 2025 | 2026 | Total | |
| Tournaments | 0 | 11 | 20 | 18 | 49 | |
| Titles | 0 | 0 | 0 | 0 | 0 | |
| Finals | 0 | 0 | 0 | 0 | 0 | |
| Win/Loss | 0–0 | 3–11 | 13–20 | 9–18 | 25–49 | |
| Win % | – | 21% | 39% | 33% | 34% | |
| Year-end ranking | 176 | 90 | 78 | | | |

=== Doubles ===
| Tournament | 2024 | 2025 | 2026 | SR | W–L |
|---|---|---|---|---|---|
Grand Slam tournaments
| Australian Open | 1R | 2R | 1R | 0 / 3 | 1–3 |
| French Open | A | A | A | 0 / 0 | 0–0 |
| Wimbledon | A | 1R | A | 0 / 1 | 0–1 |
| US Open | A | 1R | A | 0 / 1 | 0–1 |
| Win–loss | 0–1 | 1–3 | 0–1 | 0 / 5 | 1–5 |
Career statistics
| | 2024 | 2025 | 2026 | Total | |
| Tournaments | 2 | 2 | 8 | 0 | 13 |
| Titles | 0 | 0 | 0 | 0 | |
| Finals | 0 | 0 | 0 | 0 | |
| Win/Loss | 1–2 | 6–8 | 0–3 | 7–13 | |
| Win % | 33% | 43% | – | 35% | |
| Year-end ranking | 185 | 197 | | | |

== Wins over top-10 players ==
| Season | 2026 | Total |
|---|---|---|
| Wins | 1 | 1 |

| # | Player | Rk | Event | Surface | Rd | Score | Rk | Ref |
|---|---|---|---|---|---|---|---|---|
2026
| 1. | Daniil Medvedev | 8 | French Open, France | Clay | 1R | 6–2, 1–6, 6–1, 1–6, 6–4 | 97 | |
