= Marcus Willis =

British tennis player (born 1990)

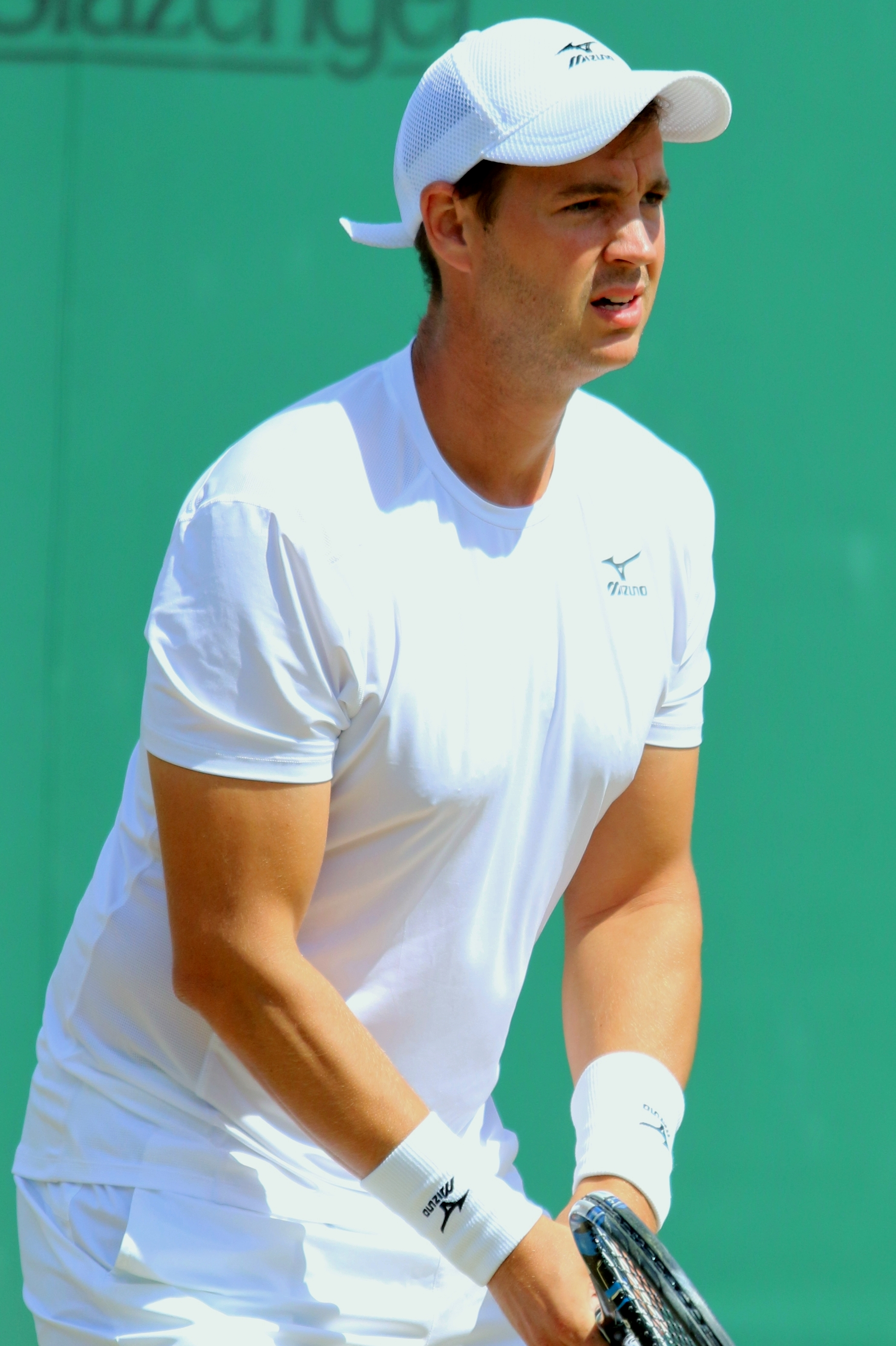
- Willis at the 2017 Wimbledon Championships
- Country (sports): (United Kingdom) Great Britain
- Born: 9 October 1990 (age 36) Slough, Berkshire, England, UK
- Height: 1.91 m (6 ft 3 in)
- Turned pro: 2007
- Retired: 2021 (singles)
- Plays: Left-handed (two-handed backhand)
- Coach: Matt Smith
- Prize money: US $517,973

Singles
- Career record: 1–1
- Career titles: 0
- Highest ranking: No. 322 (16 June 2014)

Grand Slam singles results
- Wimbledon: 2R (2016)

Doubles
- Career record: 19–20
- Career titles: 0
- Highest ranking: No. 58 (24 August 2026)
- Current ranking: No. 58 (24 August 2026)

Grand Slam doubles results
- Australian Open: 2R (2026)
- French Open: 3R (2026)
- Wimbledon: 3R (2017)
- US Open: 3R (2025)

Mixed doubles
- Career record: 3–3
- Career titles: 0

Grand Slam mixed doubles results
- Wimbledon: QF (2024)
- Last updated on: 7 September 2026.

Marcus Willis (born 9 October 1990) is a British professional tennis player who currently specialises in doubles. He has a career high ATP doubles ranking of world No. 58 achieved on 24 August 2026 and a best singles ranking of No. 322 achieved on 16 June 2014.

Willis made his ATP tour debut at the 2016 Wimbledon Championships after qualifying for the main draw, where he gained recognition after playing against Roger Federer in the second round on Centre Court.

He has won 9 titles on the ATP Challenger Tour and 37 on the ITF World Tennis Tour from 70 career doubles finals. He has a record of 46 wins and 24 losses. He has also won 9 singles titles on the ITF Tour from 16 finals.

Willis also played touchtennis, in which he has a career-high ranking of No. 1 in singles, having won 13 singles and two doubles titles.

== Personal life ==
Willis began playing tennis at the age of 9. His mother is a learning support assistant and his father is an accountant. Willis attended St Paul's Primary School, Wokingham and The Forest School, Winnersh. Willis is married to Jennifer Bate, an NHS dental surgeon and former beauty model whom he had met at a concert.

== Juniors ==
Willis played his first junior match in April 2006 at the age of 15 at a grade 5 tournament in the UK. Throughout his junior career, he reached a high of No. 15 in the combined junior world rankings in September 2008 at posted a win–loss record of 92–36.

Willis was sent home from the 2008 Australian Open by the Lawn Tennis Association (LTA) for his "slack attitude" when he missed the bus to a practice session and eventually arrived without rackets, having left them at his hotel.

Junior Slam results – Singles:

French Open: 2R (2008)
Wimbledon: 3R (2007, 2008)
US Open: 2R (2008)

Junior Slam results – Doubles:

French Open: 1R (2008)
Wimbledon: 2R (2007)
US Open: 2R (2008)

== Professional career ==
=== 2007–2015 ===
Willis officially turned pro in 2007 at the age of 17. Throughout 2007–2015, he made 14 ITF singles finals and 41 ITF doubles finals (winning 8 singles and 25 doubles). He only made one challenger final, the 2014 Charlottesville Challenger where he made the doubles final partnering Lewis Burton where they lost to top seed Treat Huey and Frederik Nielsen in three sets. He got a wildcard spot into the 2009 Wimbledon Qualifying where he lost in the second round and the 2014 Wimbledon Qualifying where he lost in the first round. He achieved a career-high ranking of 322 on June 16, 2014.

=== 2016: Wimbledon second round ===
The only success for Willis in the first five months of 2016 was qualifying for the Tunisia Futures F1 in January, and progressing to the quarterfinals, where he won $356. His failure to defend the previous year's points led to his ranking falling to number 772 by the start of Wimbledon.

Willis was considering his retirement in 2016 as he had just torn his hamstring and was offered a tennis teaching job in Philadelphia. His girlfriend, Jennifer Bate, convinced him to keep playing professional tennis and to give it one more try. He trained heavily throughout February to May to play his next event at Wimbledon qualifying.

Willis was awarded a spot into the qualifying draw after countryman David Rice withdrew. He won three matches to qualify for the main draw of the 2016 Wimbledon Championships, which included wins against future top-ten players Daniil Medvedev and Andrey Rublev. In the first round, Willis upset Ričardas Berankis, a player ranked more than 700 places above him, to set up a clash with seven-time champion Roger Federer. Willis was defeated by Federer 6–0, 6–3, 6–4 on Centre Court in the second round, receiving a standing ovation nevertheless. The BBC later held a vote for the best shot made of the tournament, and Willis's lob over Federer earned him the win.

Injury prevented Willis from playing immediately after Wimbledon 2016, but he was given a wild card into qualifying for the Erste Bank Open 500 in Vienna over the weekend of October 22–23. He has also been invited to play Tie Break Tens at the same venue on Sunday 23 October, against Andy Murray, Dominic Thiem and Jo Wilfried Tsonga.

His second tournament after Wimbledon was a Future in Kuwait which he won both the singles and the doubles.

=== 2017: Wimbledon doubles third round ===
Willis played few tournaments in the first half of 2017 due to injuries and becoming a father to his first child (a girl) but played in the Great Britain F1, F2 and F3, reaching the second round, semi-finals and finals respectively, winning $2283 overall. He then reached the quarter-finals of the U.S.A. F15 but lost in the first round of the Spain F14. He then failed to qualify for the Challenger in Surbiton and then reached the second round of the Ilkley Challenger, losing to Sam Groth.

At the 2017 Wimbledon Championships, Willis lost in the final round of qualifying to Illya Marchenko in straight sets, although Willis had been hindered by a knee injury he suffered against fellow Brit Liam Broady in the previous round. Since he failed to defend his points from last years Wimbledon his ranking fell below number 500 in the world.

In the Wimbledon doubles, he and partner Jay Clarke had been awarded a wild card for the main draw. In the opening round, they beat Jared Donaldson and Jeevan Nedunchezhiyan after coming back from two sets to love. They caused a big surprise by defeating the defending champions and second seeds Nicolas Mahut and Pierre-Hugues Herbert in the next round, also in a five-setter. Their run ended with a loss to Oliver Marach and Mate Pavić in the third round.

=== 2018–2020: Final years in singles ===
Willis missed Wimbledon in singles after losing to Dan Evans in the pre-qualifying playoffs. His final professional match was in the qualifying event for the 2018 Wimbledon doubles. After Wimbledon, he played for the San Diego Aviators in the 2018 World TeamTennis league, where the team narrowly missed the WTT finals.

He had continued to play doubles tournaments at Futures events since November 2020.

His most recent participation in touchtennis dated back to September 2020, prior to his return in 2022.

=== 2021: Retirement in singles ===
In March 2021, Willis announced he was retiring from the sport.

=== 2022–2023: Doubles comeback, first Challenger title ===
WIllis resumed playing doubles on the ITF tour from August 2022. Until May 2023, he won seven ITF 25k tournaments, six of them with partner Scott Duncan. He then mainly plays on the ATP Challenger Tour. On 2 December 2023, he won his first ATP Challenger title in Maspalomas, again with partner Duncan.

=== 2024: Wimbledon mixed doubles quarterfinal, top 100 ===
In January, Willis won his second doubles title on the ATP Challenger Tour in Oeiras, partnering Jay Clarke. Over the course of the next five months he went on to win another five Challenger titles including his first on grass at the Nottingham Open, where he and John Peers defeated Harold Mayot and Luke Saville in the final when it went to a deciding champions tiebreak. As a result of winning the title he reached the top 100 in the doubles rankings at world No. 95 on 17 June 2024.

Partnering Alicia Barnett at Wimbledon, Willis reached the mixed doubles quarterfinals, losing to eventual finalists Santiago González and Giuliana Olmos in straight sets. He also received a wildcard for the doubles event partnering Jay Clarke.

In October, he won his seventh Challenger title of the season at the Taipei OEC Open, partnering David Stevenson to a straight sets victory over Nam Ji-sung and Joshua Paris in the final.

=== 2025: Maiden ATP doubles final ===
Partnering Patrik Trhac, Willis reached his first ATP Tour doubles final at the Croatia Open, losing to fourth seeds Romain Arneodo and Manuel Guinard.

In August, he made his debut at the US Open, after receiving a last-minute place in the draw as an alternate alongside Karol Drzewiecki following the withdrawal of Francisco Cerúndolo and Federico Agustín Gómez. They defeated 16th seeds Matthew Ebden and Jordan Thompson, before overcoming John Peers and Jackson Withrow to reach the third round, at which point they lost to Tomáš Macháč and Matěj Vocel.

=== 2026: Second ATP doubles final ===
In July, Willis reached the doubles final at the Croatia Open Umag for the second year in succession, this time partnering with David Stevenson, but he again had to settle for being runner-up as they lost to top seeds Adam Pavlásek and Patrik Rikl in a deciding champions tiebreak.

== Performance timelines ==
Key
| W | F | SF | QF | #R | RR | Q# | DNQ | A | NH |

(W) winner; (F) finalist; (SF) semifinalist; (QF) quarterfinalist; (#R) rounds 4, 3, 2, 1; (RR) round-robin stage; (Q#) qualification round; (DNQ) did not qualify; (A) absent; (NH) not held; (SR) strike rate (events won / competed); (W–L) win–loss record.
To avoid confusion and double counting, these charts are updated at the conclusion of a tournament or when the player's participation has ended.

=== Singles ===
| Tournament | 2008 | 2009 | 2010 | 2011 | 2012 | 2013 | 2014 | 2015 | 2016 | 2017 | 2018 | SR | W–L |
|---|---|---|---|---|---|---|---|---|---|---|---|---|---|
Grand Slam tournaments
| Wimbledon | A | Q2 | A | A | A | A | Q1 | A | 2R | Q3 | A | 0 / 1 | 1–1 |
Career statistics
| Overall win–loss | 0–0 | 0–0 | 0–0 | 0–0 | 0–0 | 0–0 | 0–0 | 0–0 | 1–1 | 0–0 | 0–0 | 1–1 | |
| Year-end ranking | 965 | 606 | 609 | 729 | 962 | 350 | 365 | 474 | 441 | 598 | – | | |

=== Doubles ===
Current through the 2026 Lyon Open.

| Tournament | 2008 | 2009 | 2010 | 2011 | 2012 | 2013 | 2014 | 2015 | 2016 | 2017 | 2018 | 2019 | 2020 | 2021 | 2022 | 2023 | 2024 | 2025 | 2026 | SR | W–L |
|---|---|---|---|---|---|---|---|---|---|---|---|---|---|---|---|---|---|---|---|---|---|
Grand Slam tournaments
| Australian Open | A | A | A | A | A | A | A | A | A | A | A | A | A | A | A | A | A | A | 2R | 0 / 1 | 1–1 |
| French Open | A | A | A | A | A | A | A | A | A | A | A | A | A | A | A | A | A | A | 3R | 0 / 1 | 1–1 |
| Wimbledon | Q1 | Q1 | Q1 | A | A | A | Q1 | A | A | 3R | Q1 | A | NH | A | A | A | 1R | 2R | 2R | 0 / 4 | 4–4 |
| US Open | A | A | A | A | A | A | A | A | A | A | A | A | A | A | A | A | A | 3R | 1R | 0 / 2 | 2–2 |
| Win–loss | 0–0 | 0–0 | 0–0 | 0–0 | 0–0 | 0–0 | 0–0 | 0–0 | 0–0 | 2–1 | 0–0 | 0–0 | 0–0 | 0–0 | 0–0 | 0–0 | 0–1 | 3–2 | 3–4 | 0 / 8 | 8–8 |
Career statistics
| Tournaments | 0 | 0 | 0 | 0 | 0 | 0 | 0 | 0 | 0 | 1 | 0 | 0 | 0 | 0 | 0 | 0 | 1 | 7 | 14 | 23 | |
| Titles | 0 | 0 | 0 | 0 | 0 | 0 | 0 | 0 | 0 | 0 | 0 | 0 | 0 | 0 | 0 | 0 | 0 | 0 | 0 | 0 | |
| Finals | 0 | 0 | 0 | 0 | 0 | 0 | 0 | 0 | 0 | 0 | 0 | 0 | 0 | 0 | 0 | 0 | 0 | 1 | 1 | 2 | |
| Overall win–loss | 0–0 | 0–0 | 0–0 | 0–0 | 0–0 | 0–0 | 0–0 | 0–0 | 0–0 | 2–1 | 0–0 | 0–0 | 0–0 | 0–0 | 0–0 | 0–0 | 0–1 | 8–7 | 9–14 | 19–23 | |
| Year-end ranking | – | 378 | 489 | 617 | 898 | 325 | 251 | 432 | 1052 | 230 | 750 | – | 1367 | 1470 | 446 | 166 | 89 | 78 | | 45% | |

=== Mixed doubles ===
| Tournament | 2024 | 2025 | 2026 | SR | W–L |
|---|---|---|---|---|---|
Grand Slam tournaments
| Wimbledon | QF | 1R | 2R | 0 / 3 | 3–3 |

== ATP Tour finals ==
=== Doubles: 2 (2 runner-ups) ===
| Legend Grand Slam (–) ATP 1000 (–) ATP 500 (–) ATP 250 (0–2) | Finals by surface Hard (–) Clay (0–2) Grass (–) |

| Result | W–L | Date | Tournament | Tier | Surface | Partner | Opponents | Score |
|---|---|---|---|---|---|---|---|---|
| Loss | 0–1 | Jul 2025 | Croatia Open, Croatia | ATP 250 | Clay | (United States) Patrik Trhac | (Monaco) Romain Arneodo (France) Manuel Guinard | 5–7, 6–7^{(2–7)} |
| Loss | 0–2 | Jul 2026 | Croatia Open, Croatia | ATP 250 | Clay | (United Kingdom) David Stevenson | (Czech Republic) Adam Pavlásek (Czech Republic) Patrik Rikl | 3–6, 6–4, [6–10] |

== ATP Challenger finals ==
=== Doubles: 16 (11 titles, 5 runner-ups) ===
Finals by surface
Hard (5–5)
Clay (4–0)
Grass (2–0)

| Result | W–L | Date | Tournament | Surface | Partner | Opponents | Score |
|---|---|---|---|---|---|---|---|
| Loss | 0–1 | Nov 2014 | Charlottesville, United States | Hard (i) | (United Kingdom) Lewis Burton | (Philippines) Treat Huey (Denmark) Frederik Nielsen | 6–3, 3–6, [2–10] |
| Win | 1–1 | Dec 2023 | Maspalomas, Spain | Clay | (United Kingdom) Scott Duncan | (France) Théo Arribagé (France) Sadio Doumbia | 7–6^{(7–5)}, 6–4 |
| Win | 2–1 | Jan 2024 | Oeiras, Portugal | Hard (i) | (United Kingdom) Jay Clarke | (France) Théo Arribagé (Belgium) Michael Geerts | 6–4, 6–7^{(9–11)}, [10–3] |
| Loss | 2–2 | Jan 2024 | Oeiras, Portugal | Hard (i) | (India) Arjun Kadhe | (Poland) Karol Drzewiecki (Poland) Piotr Matuszewski | 3–6, 4–6 |
| Win | 3–2 | Feb 2024 | Glasgow, United Kingdom | Hard (i) | (United Kingdom) Scott Duncan | (United Kingdom) Kyle Edmund (United Kingdom) Henry Searle | 6–3, 6–2 |
| Win | 4–2 | Mar 2024 | Lille, France | Hard (i) | (United States) Christian Harrison | (France) Titouan Droguet (France) Giovanni Mpetshi Perricard | 7–6^{(8–6)}, 6–3 |
| Win | 5–2 | Apr 2024 | Savannah, United States | Clay | (United States) Christian Harrison | (Sweden) Simon Freund (Denmark) Johannes Ingildsen | 6–3, 6–3 |
| Win | 6–2 | May 2024 | Tunis, Tunisia | Clay | (Argentina) Federico Agustín Gómez | (Czech Republic) Patrik Rikl (Czech Republic) Michael Vrbenský | 4–6, 6–1, [10–6] |
| Win | 7–2 | Jun 2024 | Nottingham, United Kingdom | Grass | (Australia) John Peers | (France) Harold Mayot (Australia) Luke Saville | 6–1, 6–7^{(1–7)}, [10–7] |
| Win | 8–2 | Oct 2024 | Taipei, Taiwan | Hard (i) | (United Kingdom) David Stevenson | (South Korea) Nam Ji-sung (United Kingdom) Joshua Paris | 6–3, 6–3 |
| Loss | 8–3 | Feb 2025 | Glasgow, United Kingdom | Hard (i) | (United States) Vasil Kirkov | (Israel) Daniel Cukierman (United Kingdom) Joshua Paris | 7–5, 4–6, [10–12] |
| Win | 9–3 | Apr 2025 | San Luis Potosí, Mexico | Clay | Ivan Liutarevich | (United States) Trey Hilderbrand (United States) Alfredo Perez | 6–3, 6–4 |
| Loss | 9–4 | Nov 2025 | Bratislava, Slovakia | Hard (i) | (United Kingdom) Joshua Paris | (Belgium) Sander Gillé (Netherlands) Sem Verbeek | 6–7^{(3–7)}, 3–6 |
| Win | 10–4 | Nov 2025 | Bergamo, Italy | Hard (i) | (United Kingdom) Joshua Paris | (Czech Republic) David Poljak (Germany) Tim Rühl | 7–6^{(7–3)}, 6–4 |
| Win | 11–4 | Jun 2026 | Ilkley, United Kingdom | Grass | (United Kingdom) David Stevenson | (India) Rithvik Choudary Bollipalli (United States) Trey Hilderbrand | 7–6^{(7–5)}, 6–3 |
| Loss | 11–5 | Oct 2026 | Roanne, France | Hard (i) | (United Kingdom) David Stevenson | (Monaco) Romain Arneodo (Germany) Hendrik Jebens | 4–6, 4–6 |

== ITF Tour finals ==
=== Singles: 16 (9–7) ===
Finals by surface
Hard (7–7)
Clay (1–0)
Grass (1–0)

| Result | W–L | Date | Tournament | Surface | Opponent | Score |
|---|---|---|---|---|---|---|
| Loss | 0–1 | Oct 2008 | Great Britain F16, Glasgow | Hard (i) | (United Kingdom) Dan Evans | 2–6, 1–3 ret. |
| Win | 1–1 | Jan 2013 | Great Britain F1, Glasgow | Hard (i) | (United Kingdom) Josh Goodall | 6–4, 6–4 |
| Loss | 1–2 | Mar 2013 | Great Britain F6, Shrewsbury | Hard (i) | (United Kingdom) Dan Evans | 6–7^{(3–7)}, 6–7^{(1–7)} |
| Win | 2–2 | Jul 2013 | Great Britain F14, Felixstowe | Grass | (United Kingdom) Neil Pauffley | 6–2, 6–4 |
| Loss | 2–3 | Aug 2013 | Great Britain F17, Wrexham | Hard | (United Kingdom) Daniel Cox | 2–6, 3–6 |
| Loss | 2–4 | Sep 2013 | Kuwait F2, Mishref | Hard | (Slovakia) Ivo Klec | 6–3, 1–6, 4–6 |
| Win | 3–4 | Oct 2013 | Kuwait F3, Mishref | Hard | (France) Tak Khunn Wang | 6–3, 6–2 |
| Loss | 3–5 | Mar 2014 | Thailand F3, Nonthaburi | Hard | (South Korea) Chung Hyeon | 2–6, 4–6 |
| Win | 4–5 | Mar 2014 | Great Britain F8, Tipton | Hard (i) | (Republic of Ireland) Sam Barry | 7–6^{(7–4)}, 6–4 |
| Win | 5–5 | May 2014 | Great Britain F10, Edinburgh | Clay | (United Kingdom) Neil Pauffley | 6–1, 6–3 |
| Loss | 5–6 | Sep 2014 | Great Britain F15, London | Hard | (Denmark) Frederik Nielsen | 6–2, 4–6, 4–6 |
| Win | 6–6 | Sep 2014 | Spain F27, Madrid | Hard | (France) Mick Lescure | 6–3, 6–2 |
| Win | 7–6 | May 2015 | Spain F11, Móstoles | Hard | (Spain) Jorge Hernando-Ruano | 6–7^{(14–16)}, 6–3, 7–6^{(10–8)} |
| Win | 8–6 | May 2015 | Egypt F20, Sharm El Sheikh | Hard | (Belgium) Julien Dubail | 7–5, 6–7^{(8–10)}, 7–5 |
| Win | 9–6 | Nov 2016 | Kuwait F3, Mishref | Hard | (Germany) Daniel Altmaier | 6–3, 7–6^{(10–8)} |
| Loss | 9–7 | Feb 2017 | Great Britain F3, Shrewsbury | Hard (i) | (Germany) Oscar Otte | 5–7, 6–7^{(4–7)} |

=== Doubles: 58 (37–21) ===
Finals by surface
Hard (27–17)
Clay (6–3)
Grass (2–1)
Carpet (2–0)

| Result | W–L | Date | Tournament | Surface | Partner | Opponents | Score |
|---|---|---|---|---|---|---|---|
| Loss | 0–1 | Feb 2009 | France F2, Feucherolles | Hard (i) | (United Kingdom) Dan Evans | (France) Olivier Charroin (France) Nicolas Tourte | 3–6, 4–6 |
| Win | 1–1 | May 2009 | Great Britain F6, Edinburgh | Clay | (United Kingdom) Daniel Smethurst | (United Kingdom) Richard Gabb (United Kingdom) Ashley Hewitt | 6–7^{(3–7)}, 6–3, [14–12] |
| Loss | 1–2 | Jul 2009 | Great Britain F9, Frinton | Grass | (United Kingdom) Neil Pauffley | (Republic of Ireland) Tristan Farron-Mahon (Republic of Ireland) Colin O'Brien | 7–6^{(7–5)}, 6–7^{(3–7)}, [6–10] |
| Loss | 1–3 | Aug 2009 | Belgium F2, Koksijde | Clay | (United Kingdom) Alexander Ward | (Morocco) Rabie Chaki (Belgium) Frederic De Fays | 3–6, 2–6 |
| Win | 2–3 | Sep 2009 | Italy F28, Porto Torres | Hard | (Canada) Vasek Pospisil | (Italy) Alessandro Giannessi (Italy) Francesco Piccari | 4–6, 6–3, [10–8] |
| Loss | 2–4 | Sep 2009 | Italy F29, Alghero | Hard | (Canada) Vasek Pospisil | (Italy) Federico Gaio (Italy) Alessandro Giannessi | 2–6, 5–7 |
| Loss | 2–5 | May 2010 | Great Britain F6, Edinburgh | Clay | (Republic of Ireland) Barry King | (Republic of Ireland) James Cluskey (Republic of Ireland) Colin O'Brien | 3–6, 3–6 |
| Loss | 2–6 | May 2010 | Great Britain F7, Newcastle | Clay | (United Kingdom) Maniel Bains | (Spain) Ignacio Coll Riudavets (Spain) Gerard Granollers | 1–6, 4–6 |
| Loss | 2–7 | Sep 2010 | Great Britain F14, Nottingham | Hard | (United Kingdom) Sean Thornley | (United Kingdom) Lewis Burton (United Kingdom) Dan Evans | 5–7, 6–1, [11–13] |
| Win | 3–7 | Oct 2010 | Greece F3, Heraklion | Carpet | (Republic of Ireland) Daniel Glancy | (Republic of Ireland) Sam Barry (Republic of Ireland) Colin O'Brien | 7–5, 5–7, [10–8] |
| Loss | 3–8 | Mar 2011 | Great Britain F3, Tipton | Hard (i) | (United Kingdom) Miles Bugby | (United Kingdom) Chris Eaton (United Kingdom) Josh Goodall | 2–6, 2–6 |
| Win | 4–8 | Sep 2011 | Great Britain F14, Roehampton | Hard | (United Kingdom) Josh Goodall | (United Kingdom) Lewis Burton (United Kingdom) James Marsalek | 6–3, 5–7, [10–5] |
| Win | 5–8 | Sep 2011 | Great Britain F15, Nottingham | Hard | (United Kingdom) Josh Goodall | (United Kingdom) David Rice (United Kingdom) Sean Thornley | 6–4, 7–6^{(8–6)} |
| Win | 6–8 | Jul 2012 | Great Britain F9, Manchester | Grass | (United Kingdom) Josh Goodall | (United Kingdom) Tom Burn (United Kingdom) Dan Evans | 6–2, 7–6^{(7–3)} |
| Win | 7–8 | May 2013 | Great Britain F10, Edinburgh | Clay | (United Kingdom) Matthew Short | (United Kingdom) Richard Gabb (United Kingdom) Jonny O'Mara | 4–6, 6–4, [10–8] |
| Win | 8–8 | Aug 2013 | Great Britain F17, Wrexham | Hard | (United Kingdom) George Coupland | (United Kingdom) Liam Broady (United Kingdom) Joshua Ward-Hibbert | 7–6^{(8–6)}, 6–3 |
| Win | 9–8 | Sep 2013 | Great Britain F18, Sheffield | Hard | (United Kingdom) Lewis Burton | (United Kingdom) Richard Bloomfield (United Kingdom) Daniel Cox | 6–1, 6–1 |
| Win | 10–8 | Sep 2013 | Great Britain F19, Roehampton | Hard | (United Kingdom) Lewis Burton | (United Kingdom) Edward Corrie (United Kingdom) Joshua Ward-Hibbert | 4–6, 6–4, [10–8] |
| Win | 11–8 | Sep 2013 | Kuwait F1, Mishref | Hard | (United Kingdom) Lewis Burton | (United States) Patrick Davidson (India) Saketh Myneni | 6–4, 7–5 |
| Loss | 11–9 | Sep 2013 | Kuwait F2, Mishref | Hard | (United Kingdom) Lewis Burton | (South Africa) Ruan Roelofse (France) Tak Khunn Wang | 6–4, 3–6, [6–10] |
| Win | 12–9 | Oct 2013 | Kuwait F3, Mishref | Hard | (United Kingdom) Lewis Burton | (Austria) Thomas Statzberger (Austria) Sam Weissborn | 6–2, 6–2 |
| Win | 13–9 | Oct 2013 | Great Britain F22, Tipton | Hard (i) | (United Kingdom) Lewis Burton | (United Kingdom) Graeme Dyce (United Kingdom) Calum Gee | 7–6^{(7–0)}, 6–2 |
| Win | 14–9 | Nov 2013 | Greece F20, Rethymno | Hard | (United Kingdom) Lewis Burton | (Serbia) Nikola Čačić (Greece) Alexandros Jakupovic | 6–4, 7–6^{(7–5)} |
| Win | 15–9 | Jan 2014 | Israel F1, Eilat | Hard | (United Kingdom) Lewis Burton | (Uzbekistan) Shonigmatjon Shofayziyev (Russia) Anton Zaitcev | 6–3, 6–4 |
| Loss | 15–10 | Jan 2014 | Israel F2, Eilat | Hard | (United Kingdom) Lewis Burton | (Chinese Taipei) Huang Liang-chi (Israel) Amir Weintraub | 3–6, 6–7^{(9–11)} |
| Win | 16–10 | Jan 2014 | Israel F3, Eilat | Hard | (United Kingdom) Lewis Burton | (Italy) Claudio Grassi (Israel) Amir Weintraub | 6–3, 7–5 |
| Loss | 16–11 | Feb 2014 | Thailand F1, Nonthaburi | Hard | (United Kingdom) Lewis Burton | (Japan) Yuichi Ito (Japan) Hiroki Kondo | 6–3, 3–6, [8–10] |
| Loss | 16–12 | Feb 2014 | Thailand F2, Nonthaburi | Hard | (United Kingdom) Lewis Burton | (South Korea) Chung Hyeon (South Korea) Nam Ji-sung | 4–6, 7–6^{(7–4)}, [7–10] |
| Win | 17–12 | Mar 2014 | Thailand F3, Nonthaburi | Hard | (United Kingdom) Lewis Burton | (South Korea) Chung Hyeon (South Korea) Nam Ji-sung | 6–3, 7–5 |
| Win | 18–12 | Mar 2014 | Great Britain F8, Tipton | Hard (i) | (United Kingdom) Lewis Burton | (United Kingdom) David Rice (United Kingdom) Sean Thornley | 4–6, 7–6^{(7–5)}, [10–6] |
| Win | 19–12 | Apr 2014 | Great Britain F9, Bournemouth | Clay | (United Kingdom) Lewis Burton | (Australia) Jake Eames (United Kingdom) Brydan Klein | 6–1, 7–5 |
| Win | 20–12 | May 2014 | Great Britain F10, Edinburgh | Clay | (United Kingdom) Jonny O'Mara | (Australia) Maverick Banes (Australia) Gavin van Peperzeel | 7–6^{(7–3)}, 6–1 |
| Win | 21–12 | May 2014 | Great Britain F11, Newcastle | Clay | (United Kingdom) Jonny O'Mara | (Australia) Maverick Banes (Australia) Gavin van Peperzeel | 7–6^{(10–8)}, 6–1 |
| Loss | 21–13 | Aug 2014 | Spain F24, Pozoblanco | Hard | (United Kingdom) Lewis Burton | (United Kingdom) Edward Corrie (United Kingdom) David Rice | 4–6, 5–7 |
| Win | 22–13 | Jan 2015 | Great Britain F2, Sunderland | Hard (i) | (United Kingdom) Lewis Burton | (Sweden) Isak Arvidsson (Finland) Micke Kontinen | 6–3, 6–2 |
| Loss | 22–14 | Mar 2015 | Great Britain F5, Shrewsbury | Hard (i) | (United Kingdom) Sean Thornley | (United Kingdom) Luke Bambridge (United Kingdom) Scott Clayton | 6–7^{(3–7)}, 4–6 |
| Loss | 22–15 | May 2015 | Spain F11, Móstoles | Hard | (Spain) José Checa Calvo | (Spain) Juan-Samuel Arauzo (Spain) Ivan Arenas-Gualda | 3–6, 7–5, [5–10] |
| Win | 23–15 | May 2015 | Egypt F19, Sharm El Sheikh | Hard | (United Kingdom) Daniel Smethurst | (Egypt) Karim-Mohamed Maamoun (Syria) Issam Haitham Taweel | 6–4, 6–4 |
| Win | 24–15 | May 2015 | Egypt F20, Sharm El Sheikh | Hard | (United Kingdom) Daniel Smethurst | (Egypt) Karim Hossam (Syria) Issam Haitham Taweel | 6–1, 6–3 |
| Win | 25–15 | Jul 2015 | Great Britain F6, Frinton | Grass | (United Kingdom) Daniel Smethurst | (United Kingdom) Evan Hoyt (Australia) Bradley Mousley | 6–4, 6–4 |
| Loss | 25–16 | Sep 2015 | Sweden F4, Falun | Hard (i) | (United Kingdom) James Marsalek | (Republic of Ireland) David O'Hare (United Kingdom) Joe Salisbury | 3–6, 5–7 |
| Win | 26–16 | Nov 2016 | Kuwait F3, Mishref | Hard | (Germany) Daniel Altmaier | (Netherlands) Roy Sarut De Valk (France) Ronan Joncour | 6–1, 6–1 |
| Loss | 26–17 | Feb 2017 | Great Britain F3, Shrewsbury | Hard (i) | (United Kingdom) Jack Molloy | (United Kingdom) Scott Clayton (United Kingdom) Luke Johnson | 6–3, 4–6, [6–10] |
| Win | 27–17 | Aug 2017 | Portugal F17, Sintra | Hard | (United Kingdom) Edward Corrie | (France) Yanais Laurent (France) Maxime Tchoutakian | 6–1, 6–4 |
| Loss | 27–18 | Feb 2018 | Great Britain F1, Glasgow | Hard (i) | (United Kingdom) Neil Pauffley | (Austria) Matthias Haim (Germany) Jakob Sude | 3–6, 7–6^{(7–5)}, [6–10] |
| Win | 28–18 | Feb 2018 | Great Britain F3, Shrewsbury | Hard (i) | (United Kingdom) Scott Clayton | (Finland) Harri Heliövaara (Denmark) Frederik Nielsen | 6–2, 7–5 |
| Loss | 28–19 | Sep 2022 | France M25, Bagnères-de-Bigorre | Hard | (United Kingdom) James MacKinlay | (Belgium) Joris de Loore (Belgium) Yannick Mertens | 6–7^{(3–7)}, 7–6^{(8–6)}, [6–10] |
| Win | 29–19 | Sep 2022 | Spain M25, Madrid | Clay | (United Kingdom) Scott Duncan | (Morocco) Lamine Ouahab (Algeria) Mohamed Nazim Makhlouf | 6–1, 6–3 |
| Loss | 29–20 | Oct 2022 | France M25, Nevers | Hard (i) | (Argentina) Federico Agustín Gómez | (France) Sascha Gueymard Wayenburg (France) Antoine Hoang | 7–6^{(12–10)}, 6–7^{(5–7)}, [7–10] |
| Win | 30–20 | Oct 2022 | France M25, Sarreguemines | Carpet (i) | (United Kingdom) Scott Duncan | (France) Grégoire Jacq (France) Arthur Bouquier | 4–6, 6–3, [10–8] |
| Win | 31–20 | Nov 2022 | France M15, Villers-lès-Nancy | Hard (i) | (United Kingdom) Scott Duncan | (France) Grégoire Jacq (France) Arthur Bouquier | 6–1, 2–0 ret. |
| Win | 32–20 | Jan 2023 | Great Britain M25, Sheffield | Hard (i) | (United Kingdom) Scott Duncan | (France) Corentin Denolly (Sweden) Simon Freund | 6–3, 6–4 |
| Win | 33–20 | Feb 2023 | Great Britain M25, Bath | Hard (i) | (United Kingdom) Scott Duncan | (United Kingdom) Ben Jones (United Kingdom) Daniel Little | 6–3, 6–4 |
| Loss | 33–21 | Mar 2023 | Canada M25, Montreal | Hard (i) | (United Kingdom) Scott Duncan | (Canada) Juan Carlos Aguilar (United Kingdom) Joe Tyler | 4–6, 7–5, [9–11] |
| Win | 34–21 | Apr 2023 | Great Britain M25, Nottingham | Hard | (Austria) Neil Oberleitner | (Denmark) August Holmgren (Denmark) Johannes Ingildsen | 7–6^{(7–1)}, 6–3 |
| Win | 35–21 | May 2023 | Great Britain M25, Nottingham | Hard | (United Kingdom) Scott Duncan | (United Kingdom) Giles Hussey (United Kingdom) Ben Jones | 6–3, 6–2 |
| Win | 36–21 | Nov 2023 | Great Britain M25, Sunderland | Hard (i) | (United Kingdom) David Stevenson | (United Kingdom) James Davis (United Kingdom) Joshua Goodger | 6–4, 7–6^{(7–3)} |
| Win | 37–21 | Jan 2024 | Great Britain M25, Sunderland | Hard (i) | (United Kingdom) David Stevenson | (France) Dan Added (France) Clément Chidekh | 4–6, 7–6^{(8–6)}, [10–8] |

== Wins over top 10 players ==
=== Doubles ===
| # | Partner | Opponents | Rank | Tournament | Surface | Rd | Score | Willis Rank |
|---|---|---|---|---|---|---|---|---|
2017
| 1. | (United Kingdom) Jay Clarke | (France) Nicolas Mahut (France) Pierre-Hugues Herbert | 4; 7 | Wimbledon, United Kingdom | Grass | 2R | 3–6, 6–1, 7–6^{(7–3)}, 5–7, 6–3 | 708 |
