= Maspalomas Challenger =

- 2023 Maspalomas Challenger

ATP Challenger Tour
- Event name: Maspalomas Challenger
- Location: Maspalomas, Spain
- Category: ATP Challenger Tour
- Surface: Clay

The Maspalomas Challenger is a professional tennis tournament played on clay courts. It is part of the Association of Tennis Professionals (ATP) Challenger Tour. It is held in Maspalomas, Spain.

== Past finals ==
=== Singles ===
Year	Champion	Runner-up	Score
2023	(Spain) Pedro Martínez	(Switzerland) Kilian Feldbausch	6–4, 4–6, 6–3
2022	(Serbia) Dušan Lajović	(Canada) Steven Diez	6–1, 6–4

=== Doubles ===
Year	Champions	Runners-up	Score
2023	(United Kingdom) Scott Duncan (United Kingdom) Marcus Willis	(France) Théo Arribagé (France) Sadio Doumbia	7–6^{(7–5)}, 6–4
2022	(United States) Evan King (United States) Reese Stalder	(Italy) Marco Bortolotti (Spain) Sergio Martos Gornés	6–3, 5–7, [11–9]
