= Steven Diez =

Canadian tennis player

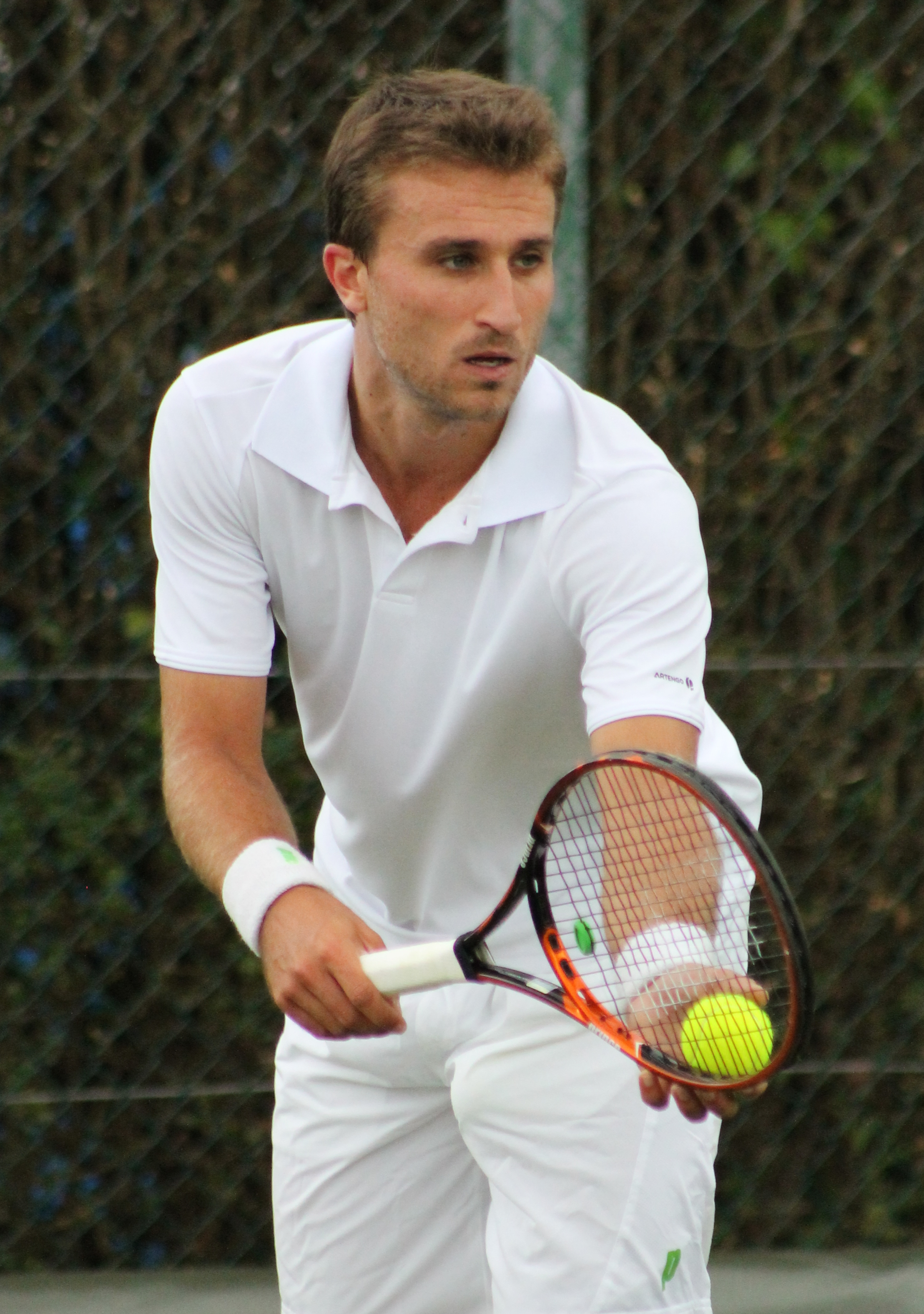
- Country (sports): Canada
- Residence: Barcelona, Spain
- Born: March 17, 1991 (age 34) Toronto, Ontario, Canada
- Height: 1.75 m (5 ft 9 in)
- Turned pro: 2009
- Retired: 2025
- Plays: Right-handed (two-handed backhand)
- Coach: Marcos Roy
- Prize money: US$ 1,061,164

Singles
- Career record: 2–14
- Career titles: 0
- Highest ranking: No. 134 (18 November 2019)

Grand Slam singles results
- Australian Open: Q2 (2013, 2020, 2021)
- French Open: 1R (2020)
- Wimbledon: Q2 (2013, 2017, 2019)
- US Open: Q3 (2016, 2019)

Doubles
- Career record: 1–1
- Career titles: 0
- Highest ranking: No. 267 (8 February 2021)

Steven Diez (Spanish: Díez, pronounced [ˈdi.eθ]; born March 17, 1991) is a Canadian former professional tennis player. He has a career-high ATP singles ranking of No. 134, achieved on 18 November 2019 and a doubles ranking of No. 267, achieved on 8 February 2021.

Diez competed for Spain earlier in his career.

== Nationality change ==
Raised primarily in and competing for Spain early in his career, he has since gone on to represent the country of his birth, Canada, in the Davis Cup. Diez was a member of the Canadian team that won the 2022 ATP Cup.

== Tennis career ==
=== 2007 ===
Diez competed in the main draw of two senior level ITF Futures tournaments in the autumn, losing both times in the first round. In his first match, at Spain F39 in late October, he fell to world No. 422 Carles Poch Gradin. He fared much better a month later taking a set off world No. 425 Juan Albert Viloca-Puig before losing.

=== 2008 ===
Diez won his first tour match in his third tournament of the year, Spain F11. He won his first ever doubles match too, partnering Ignacio Morente-Gemas to the second round of Spain F13. He then won two matches partnering Javier Valenzuela-Gonzalez to reach the semifinals of Spain F14. The same pairing reached the semis in their next tournament too, in July, at Spain F26.

In late April he competed in qualifying for an ATP World Tour event, the 2008 Torneo Godó, losing in the first round to Marc López. In July in consecutively played Futures he won his first-round match, but he failed, in singles, to reach the second round in his last five events of the year. Partnering Valenzuela-Gonzalez, he reached the second round in more events than not during this same stretch. He finished the year ranked world No. 1190 in singles and No. 1274 in doubles.

=== 2009 ===
In his third main draw for the year Diez had a break through in reaching the semi-finals of Spain F5. Two weeks later he reached his first career final, in doubles partnering José Checa Calvo at Spain F7. In June, he competed in his first main draw in an ATP Challenger, as a wild card entrant at the 2009 Open Diputación Ciudad de Pozoblanco, and reached the quarterfinals, where he lost to eventual runner-up, Thiago Alves.

The following week Diez captured his first tour title, that of Spain F23 in singles, defeating David Canudas-Fernandez in the final. His singles wins stopped there as he won only one further tour main draw for the remainder of the year while losing eight. In doubles, however, Diez continued to do well not losing in the first round for the year aside from his very first tourney. He finished the year ranked world No. 571 in singles and No. 893 in doubles.

=== 2010 ===
Diez did not win a singles main-draw match in his first five events of the year leading into a call-up of sorts by Tennis Canada to represent the country of his birth in the Davis Cup. Diez was recruited for his clay court ability as Canada faced Colombia on red clay in Bogotá. Despite breaking the serve in the first game of the match, Diez went down to World No. 93 Santiago Giraldo in straight sets as Canada lost the tie, 1–4.

In April, Diez finally won a main draw singles match, at Spain F11. He reached the second round in three consecutive events before taking his second title of this career, Spain F15 in May. He then reached the semi-finals in two of his next three events. As one of the top-ranked Canadians, Diez received wild cards into events in Canada this summer. After losing in the first round of the Challenger de Granby, he qualified for the main draw of the Vancouver Open, but lost in three close sets to Alex Kuznetsov in the first round. He won a set from Michael Russell, before falling in the first round of qualifying for the 2010 Rogers Cup in Toronto, in early August.

After reaching the semifinals of Spain F30 the week after the Rogers Cup, and losing in the first round of Belgium F3 the following week, Diez was off from match play until last week, where, as the No. 6 seed at Canada F4, he reached the semifinals. En route he won his quarterfinal match over No. 2 seed Brendan Evans, 3–6, 6–1, 3–0 ret. In doubles, he and partner Nikolai Haessig, a top Canadian junior, lost in the first round.

The following week Diez was upset in the first round of Canada F5, as the No. 4 seed, to world No. 792 Phillip Simmonds, 2–6, 3–6. He and partner Haessig reached the semifinals in doubles however. This result saw Steven's doubles ranking reach a new career high the following week, of World No. 769. After two weeks off, he played three consecutive Futures events in Spain, reaching the second round in Spain F37 in Sabadell, the quarterfinals at Spain F38 in Sant Cugat, and losing in the first round of Spain F39 in Vilafranca del Penedès. In doubles, he and partner Abraham Gonzalez-Jimenez reached the second round of Spain F37 and lost in the first round of Spain F38. They did not compete at Spain F39.

=== 2019: Career-high ranking ===
He reached a career-high ranking of world No. 134, on 18 November 2019.

=== 2020: Grand Slam debut at French Open ===
After 15 attempts at qualifying at a major, he finally made his Grand Slam debut at the 2020 French Open.

=== 2022: ATP Cup champion ===
He won the ATP Cup with team Canada defeating the Spanish team.

== Singles performance timeline ==
Key
W	F	SF	QF	#R	RR	Q#	DNQ	A	NH

(W) winner; (F) finalist; (SF) semifinalist; (QF) quarterfinalist; (#R) rounds 4, 3, 2, 1; (RR) round-robin stage; (Q#) qualification round; (DNQ) did not qualify; (A) absent; (NH) not held; (SR) strike rate (events won / competed); (W–L) win–loss record.

Tournament	2010	2011	2012	2013	2014	2015	2016	2017	2018	2019	2020	2021	2022	2023	SR	W–L	Win %
Grand Slam tournaments
Australian Open	A	A	A	Q2	Q1	A	A	Q1	A	A	Q2	Q2	A	A	0 / 0	0–0	–
French Open	A	A	A	Q1	Q1	A	A	Q2	A	A	1R	Q2	A	A	0 / 1	0–1	0%
Wimbledon	A	A	A	Q2	Q1	A	Q1	Q2	A	Q2	NH	Q1	A	A	0 / 0	0–0	–
US Open	A	A	A	Q1	A	A	Q3	A	A	Q3	A	Q1	A	A	0 / 0	0–0	–
Win–loss	0–0	0–0	0–0	0–0	0–0	0–0	0–0	0–0	0–0	0–0	0–1	0–0	0–0	0–0	0 / 1	0–1	0%
ATP Tour Masters 1000
Indian Wells	A	A	A	A	Q1	A	A	A	A	A	NH	Q1	A	A	0 / 0	0–0	–
Rome	A	A	A	A	A	A	A	A	A	A	Q2	A	A	A	0 / 0	0–0	–
Toronto / Montreal	Q1	Q1	A	Q1	Q1	A	2R	A	A	Q2	NH	Q1	Q1	A	0 / 1	1–1	50%
Win–loss	0–0	0–0	0–0	0–0	0–0	0–0	1–1	0–0	0–0	0–0	0–0	0–0	0–0	0–0	0 / 1	1–1	50%

== Other finals ==
=== Team competitions: 1 (1 title) ===
Result	Date	Tournament	Surface	Partners	Opponents	Score
Win	Jan 2022	ATP Cup, Sydney	Hard	(Canada) Félix Auger-Aliassime (Canada) Denis Shapovalov (Canada) Brayden Schnur	(Spain) Roberto Bautista Agut (Spain) Pablo Carreño Busta (Spain) A Davidovich Fokina (Spain) Albert Ramos Viñolas (Spain) Pedro Martínez	2–0

== Challenger and Futures finals ==
=== Singles: 41 (23–18) ===
Legend (singles) ATP Challenger Tour (1–5) ITF Futures Tour (22–13)	Titles by surface Hard (6–7) Clay (17–11)

Result	W–L	Date	Tournament	Tier	Surface	Opponent	Score
Win	1–0	Jul 2009	Spain F23, Elche	Futures	Clay	(Spain) David Cañudas-Fernández	6–1, 6–4
Win	2–0	May 2010	Spain F15, Balaguer	Futures	Clay	(Spain) David Estruch	6–2, 6–1
Win	3–0	Apr 2011	Brazil F11, Aracaju	Futures	Clay (i)	(Czech Republic) Roman Vögeli	6–1, 6–2
Loss	3–1	Jul 2011	Canada F3, Mississauga	Futures	Hard	(China) Li Zhe	2–6, 3–6
Win	4–1	Oct 2011	Spain F39, Vilafranca	Futures	Clay	(Spain) Jordi Samper Montaña	3–6, 6–2, 6–4
Win	5–1	Nov 2011	Spain F41, Madrid	Futures	Clay	(Netherlands) Matthew Pierot	6–0, 6–2
Loss	5–2	Jan 2012	Turkey F3, Antalya	Futures	Hard	(Bulgaria) Dimitar Kutrovsky	3–6, 0–6
Win	6–2	Feb 2012	Spain F3, Murcia	Futures	Clay	(Portugal) Pedro Sousa	2–6, 6–4, 6–3
Loss	6–3	May 2012	Spain F11, Lleida	Futures	Clay	(Spain) Sergio Gutiérrez Ferrol	6–3, 1–6, 5–7
Win	7–3	May 2012	Poland F1, Sobota	Futures	Clay	(Poland) Andriej Kapaś	7–6^{(7–4)}, 6–3
Win	8–3	Oct 2012	Algeria F1, Annaba	Futures	Clay	(Austria) Gerald Melzer	6–2, 6–3
Win	9–3	Oct 2012	Algeria F2, Annaba	Futures	Clay	(United Kingdom) Alexander Slabinsky	4–6, 6–4, 6–1
Win	10–3	Oct 2012	Algeria F3, Alger	Futures	Clay	(Italy) Francesco Picco	6–1, 4–6, 6–2
Loss	10–4	May 2013	Spain F14, Valldoreix	Futures	Clay	(Japan) Taro Daniel	3–6, 2–6
Win	11–4	Jun 2013	Spain F16, Santa Margarida de Montbui	Futures	Hard	(Spain) José Checa Calvo	6–1, 6–2
Win	12–4	Jun 2013	Spain F17, Martos	Futures	Hard	(India) Ramkumar Ramanathan	7–5, 6–7^{(4–7)}, 6–4
Loss	12–5	Jan 2014	Nouméa, New Caledonia	Challenger	Hard	(Colombia) Alejandro Falla	2–6, 2–6
Win	13–5	Aug 2015	Switzerland F4, Sion	Futures	Clay	(Argentina) Federico Coria	5–7, 7–5, 6–1
Win	14–5	Oct 2015	Spain F32, Sant Cugat del Vallès	Futures	Clay	(Spain) Marcos Giraldi Requena	6–1, 6–0
Loss	14–6	Oct 2015	Greece F8, Heraklion	Futures	Hard	(Czech Republic) Václav Šafránek	6–7^{(8–10)}, 4–6
Win	15–6	Nov 2015	Greece F9, Heraklion	Futures	Hard	(Greece) Stefanos Tsitsipas	6–2, 6–0
Loss	15–7	Jan 2016	Spain F1, Castelldefels	Futures	Clay	(Spain) Gerard Granollers Pujol	3–6, 1–6
Win	16–7	Feb 2016	Spain F2, Peguera	Futures	Clay	(Poland) Paweł Ciaś	4–6, 6–2, 7–6^{(9–7)}
Win	17–7	Feb 2016	Spain F4, Murcia	Futures	Clay	(Australia) Alex de Minaur	6–3, 6–4
Win	18–7	Mar 2016	Spain F6, Tarragona	Futures	Clay	(Spain) Gerard Granollers Pujol	5–7, 6–1, 6–0
Loss	18–8	Mar 2016	Morocco F2, Beni Mellal	Futures	Clay	(Morocco) Lamine Ouahab	2–6, 6–4, 2–6
Loss	18–9	Apr 2016	Spain F7, Madrid	Futures	Hard	(Japan) Akira Santillan	4–6, 6–7^{(5–7)}
Loss	18–10	Jun 2016	Moscow, Russia	Challenger	Clay	(Kazakhstan) Mikhail Kukushkin	3–6, 3–6
Loss	18–11	Oct 2017	Spain F31, Sabadell	Futures	Clay	(Spain) Sergio Gutiérrez Ferrol	3–6, 6–7^{(5–7)}
Win	19–11	Oct 2017	Spain F32, Melilla	Futures	Clay	(Spain) Miguel Semmler	6–2, 6–0
Loss	19–12	Oct 2017	Tunisia F31, Hammamet	Futures	Clay	(Croatia) Nino Serdarušić	3–6, 6–3, 4–6
Loss	19–13	Jan 2018	China F2, Anning	Futures	Clay	(Chinese Taipei) Yang Tsung-hua	3–6, 6–3, 6–7^{(4–7)}
Win	20–13	Apr 2018	Spain F10, Majadahonda	Futures	Clay	(Argentina) Pedro Cachin	6–3, 3–6, 7–5
Loss	20–14	Nov 2018	Tunisia F39, Monastir	Futures	Hard	(Russia) Ivan Gakhov	6–3, 2–6, 1–6
Win	21–14	Dec 2018	Tunisia F43, Monastir	Futures	Hard	(France) Gabriel Petit	6–2, 6–3
Win	22–14	Dec 2018	Tunisia F45, Monastir	Futures	Hard	(France) Clément Tabur	6–3, 7–6^{(7–3)}
Win	23–14	Jan 2019	Burnie, Australia	Challenger	Hard	(Australia) Maverick Banes	7–5, 6–1
Loss	23–15	Oct 2019	Ningbo, China	Challenger	Hard	(Japan) Yasutaka Uchiyama	1-6, 3-6
Loss	23–16	Feb 2021	Las Palmas, Spain	Challenger	Clay	(France) Enzo Couacaud	6–7^{(5–7)}, 6–7^{(3–7)}
Loss	23–17	Oct 2022	M25 Girona, Spain	World Tennis Tour	Clay	(Spain) Oriol Roca Batalla	3–6, 3–6
Loss	23–18	Dec 2022	Maspalomas, Spain	Challenger	Clay	(Serbia) Dušan Lajović	1–6, 4–6

=== Doubles: 21 (9–12) ===
Legend (doubles) ATP Challenger Tour (0–1) ITF Futures Tour (9–11)	Finals by surface Hard (3–8) Clay (6–4)

Result	W–L	Date	Tournament	Tier	Surface	Partner	Opponents	Score
Loss	0–1	Mar 2009	Spain F7, Terrassa	Futures	Clay	(Spain) José Checa Calvo	(Italy) Francesco Aldi (Italy) Alessandro Piccari	0–6, 2–6
Loss	0–2	Oct 2009	Spain F34, Córdoba	Futures	Hard	(Spain) Juan Lizariturry	(Spain) Agustín Boje-Ordóñez (Spain) Pablo Martín-Adalia	3–6, 3–6
Loss	0–3	Jan 2011	Israel F1, Eilat	Futures	Hard	(Spain) Fernando Vicente	(Slovakia) Jozef Kovalík (Slovakia) Adrian Sikora	6–2, 3–6, [10–12]
Loss	0–4	Jan 2011	Israel F2, Eilat	Futures	Hard	(Serbia) Nikola Ćaćić	(Bosnia and Herzegovina) Damir Džumhur (Bosnia and Herzegovina) Ismar Gorčić	3–6, 4–6
Win	1–4	Mar 2011	Portugal F1, Faro	Futures	Hard	(Spain) Fernando Vicente	(Spain) Agustín Boje-Ordóñez (Spain) Pablo Martín-Adalia	6–3, 6–4
Win	2–4	Apr 2011	Brazil F9, Santa Maria	Futures	Clay	(Czech Republic) Roman Vögeli	(Paraguay) Daniel Alejandro López Cassaccia (Argentina) Martín Ríos-Benítez	7–6^{(7–5)}, 6–3
Win	3–4	Apr 2011	Brazil F11, Aracaju	Futures	Clay (i)	(Czech Republic) Roman Vögeli	(Bolivia) Mauricio Doria-Medina (Paraguay) Daniel Alejandro López Cassaccia	6–1, 7–6^{(7–0)}
Loss	3–5	Jun 2011	Spain F20, Martos	Futures	Hard	(Russia) Ilya Belyaev	(Finland) Harri Heliövaara (Ukraine) Denys Molchanov	3–6, 4–6
Win	4–5	Oct 2011	Spain F35, Sevilla	Futures	Clay	(Spain) Fernando Vicente	(Spain) Axel Álvarez Llamas (Spain) Ricardo Ojeda Lara	6–2, 6–1
Win	5–5	Oct 2011	Spain F38, Sabadell	Futures	Clay	(Portugal) João Sousa	(Spain) Miguel Ángel López Jaén (Spain) Gabriel Trujillo Soler	6–3, 3–6, [10–7]
Win	6–5	Oct 2012	Algeria F2, Annaba	Futures	Hard	(Spain) Marc Giner	(Spain) Francesc Montañés-Roca (Russia) Ronald Slobodchikov	6–4, 6–2
Win	7–5	Mar 2013	Croatia F5, Rovinj	Futures	Clay	(Bosnia and Herzegovina) Tomislav Brkić	(Austria) Nikolaus Moser (Austria) Tristan-Samuel Weissborn	6–2, 6–2
Loss	7–6	Jun 2013	Russia F8, Moscow	Futures	Clay	(Russia) Vladislav Dubinsky	(Belarus) Aliaksandr Bury (Ukraine) Volodymyr Uzhylovskyi	0–6, 1–6
Loss	7–7	Aug 2014	Como, Italy	Challenger	Clay	(Spain) Enrique López Pérez	(Argentina) Guido Andreozzi (Argentina) Facundo Argüello	2–6, 2–6
Loss	7–8	Oct 2015	Spain F32, Sant Cugat del Vallès	Futures	Clay	(Spain) Andrés Artuñedo Martínavarro	(Spain) Sergio Martos Gornés (Spain) Pol Toledo Bagué	2–6, 3–6
Loss	7–9	Nov 2015	Cyprus F2, Limassol	Futures	Hard	(Spain) Andrés Artuñedo Martínavarro	(Cyprus) Petros Chrysochos (Croatia) Nino Serdarušić	6–1, 4–6, [3–10]
Loss	7–10	Dec 2015	Cyprus F3, Limassol	Futures	Hard	(Spain) Andrés Artuñedo Martínavarro	(Greece) Konstantinos Economidis (Russia) Markos Kalovelonis	6–4, 3–6, [5–10]
Win	8–10	Oct 2017	Tunisia F31, Hammamet	Futures	Clay	(Spain) Bruno Mardones	(Netherlands) Guy den Heijer (Netherlands) Sidane Pontjodikromo	6–2, 6–4
Loss	8–11	Mar 2018	Portugal F6, Lisbon	Futures	Hard	(Spain) Bruno Mardones	(Estonia) Kenneth Raisma (Finland) Emil Ruusuvuori	6–7^{(2–7)}, 2–6
Win	9–11	Nov 2018	Tunisia F40, Monastir	Futures	Hard	(Spain) Sergio Martos Gornés	(Belarus) Mikalai Haliak (Belarus) Alexander Zgirovsky	6–3, 6–1
Loss	9–12	Dec 2018	Tunisia F43, Monastir	Futures	Hard	(Italy) Marco Bortolotti	(United Kingdom) Evan Hoyt (United Kingdom) Luke Johnson	4–6, 2–6
