= 2024 Open de Rennes =

- Date: 9–15 September
- Edition: 18th
- Surface: Hard (Indoor)
- Location: Rennes, France

Champions

Singles
- (United Kingdom) Jacob Fearnley

Doubles
- (Netherlands) Sander Arends / (France) Grégoire Jacq
← 2023 ·	Open de Rennes	· 2025 →

The 2024 Open Blot Rennes was a professional tennis tournament played on hard courts. It was the 18th edition of the tournament and part of the 2024 ATP Challenger Tour. It took place in Rennes, France between 9 and 15 September 2024.

== Singles main-draw entrants ==
=== Seeds ===
Country	Player	Rank^{1}	Seed
FRA	Adrian Mannarino	42	1
FRA	Constant Lestienne	111	2
FRA	Harold Mayot	113	3
FRA	Quentin Halys	119	4
FRA	Benjamin Bonzi	129	5
FRA	Titouan Droguet	146	6
FRA	Lucas Pouille	147	7
GBR	Jacob Fearnley	158	8

- ^{1} Rankings are as of 26 August 2024.

=== Other entrants ===
The following players received wildcards into the singles main draw:

- (France) Sascha Gueymard Wayenburg
- (France) Laurent Lokoli
- (France) Adrian Mannarino

The following player received entry into the singles main draw using a protected ranking:

- (France) Evan Furness

The following players received entry into the singles main draw as alternates:

- (France) Mathias Bourgue
- (Belgium) Michael Geerts

The following players received entry from the qualifying draw:

- (Georgia (country)) Nikoloz Basilashvili
- (France) Arthur Bouquier
- (Ivory Coast) Eliakim Coulibaly
- (France) Kenny de Schepper
- (Canada) Steven Diez
- (Germany) Max Wiskandt

== Champions ==
=== Singles ===
- (United Kingdom) Jacob Fearnley def. (France) Quentin Halys 0–6, 7–6^{(7–5)}, 6–3.

=== Doubles ===
- (Netherlands) Sander Arends / (France) Grégoire Jacq def. (France) Antoine Escoffier / (United Kingdom) Joshua Paris 6–4, 6–2.
