= 2023 Open de Rennes – Doubles =

Doubles
- 2023 Open de Rennes

Final
- Champions: (Netherlands) Sander Arends (Netherlands) David Pel
- Runners-up: (France) Antoine Escoffier (India) Niki Kaliyanda Poonacha
- Score: 6–3, 6–2

Events
Singles	Doubles
- Open de Rennes

Jonathan Eysseric and David Pel were the defending champions but chose to defend their title with different partners. Eysseric partnered Quentin Halys but lost in the first round to Sander Arends and Pel. Pel partnered Arends and successfully defended his title, defeating Antoine Escoffier and Niki Kaliyanda Poonacha 6–3, 6–2 in the final.

== Seeds ==
1. (France) Sadio Doumbia / (France) Fabien Reboul (semifinals)
2. (Netherlands) Sander Arends / (Netherlands) David Pel (champions)
3. (India) Jeevan Nedunchezhiyan / (Australia) John-Patrick Smith (first round)
4. (France) Théo Arribagé / (France) Luca Sanchez (first round)

== Draw ==
Key

- Q = Qualifier
- WC = Wild card
- LL = Lucky loser
- Alt = Alternate
- ITF = ITF entry
- PR = Protected ranking
- SR = Special ranking
- SE = Special exempt
- JE = Junior exempt
- JR = Junior Accelerator Programme entrant
- CO = College Accelerator Programme entrant
- NG = Next Gen Accelerator Program entrant
- w/o = Walkover
- r = Retired
- d = Defaulted

First round
1	(France) S Doumbia (France) F Reboul	6	6
(United Kingdom) L Johnson (Netherlands) B Stevens	4	2
(United States) H Reese (Poland) S Walków	7^{7}	3	[12]
PR	(India) S Balaji (Germany) A Begemann	6^{3}	6	[10]
4	(France) T Arribagé (France) L Sanchez	5	4
(France) A Escoffier (India) N Kaliyanda Poonacha	7	6
(United Kingdom) S Duncan (United Kingdom) M Willis	6	2	[8]
(Italy) M Bellucci (Italy) L Nardi	0	6	[10]
WC	(France) Maxence Beaugé (France) Lucas Bouquet	5	3
WC	(Ukraine) V Uzhylovskyi (Italy) Samuel Vincent Ruggeri	7	6
(France) M Guinard (France) G Jacq	6	6
3	(India) J Nedunchezhiyan (Australia) J-P Smith	2	2
(United States) U Blanch (United States) Em Nava	6	2	[8]
(Philippines) R Gonzales (Austria) M Neuchrist	2	6	[10]
(France) J Eysseric (France) Q Halys	6^{7}	4
2	(Netherlands) S Arends (Netherlands) D Pel	7^{9}	6

Quarterfinals
1	(France) S Doumbia (France) F Reboul	7^{7}	7
(United States) H Reese (Poland) S Walków	6^{4}	5
(France) A Escoffier (India) N Kaliyanda Poonacha	w/o
(Italy) M Bellucci (Italy) L Nardi
WC	(Ukraine) V Uzhylovskyi (Italy) S Vincent Ruggeri	2	4
(France) M Guinard (France) G Jacq	6	6
(Philippines) R Gonzales (Austria) M Neuchrist	6^{10}	3
2	(Netherlands) S Arends (Netherlands) D Pel	7^{12}	6

Semifinals
1	(France) S Doumbia (France) F Reboul	5	6	[7]
(France) A Escoffier (India) N Kaliyanda Poonacha	7	2	[10]
(France) M Guinard (France) G Jacq	3	4
2	(Netherlands) S Arends (Netherlands) D Pel	6	6

Final
(France) A Escoffier (India) N Kaliyanda Poonacha	3	2
2	(Netherlands) S Arends (Netherlands) D Pel	6	6
