= 2024 Open de Rennes – Singles =

Singles
- 2024 Open de Rennes

Final
- Champion: (United Kingdom) Jacob Fearnley
- Runner-up: (France) Quentin Halys
- Score: 0–6, 7–6^{(7–5)}, 6–3

Events
Singles	Doubles
← 2023 ·	Open de Rennes	· 2025 →

Maxime Cressy was the defending champion but chose not to defend his title.

Jacob Fearnley won the title after defeating Quentin Halys 0–6, 7–6^{(7–5)}, 6–3 in the final.

== Seeds ==
1. (France) Adrian Mannarino (quarterfinals)
2. (France) Constant Lestienne (semifinals)
3. (France) Harold Mayot (semifinals)
4. (France) Quentin Halys (final)
5. (France) Benjamin Bonzi (second round)
6. (France) Titouan Droguet (quarterfinals)
7. (France) Lucas Pouille (quarterfinals)
8. (United Kingdom) Jacob Fearnley (champion)

== Draw ==
=== Key ===
- Q = Qualifier
- WC = Wild card
- LL = Lucky loser
- Alt = Alternate
- ITF = ITF entry
- PR = Protected ranking
- SR = Special ranking
- SE = Special exempt
- JE = Junior exempt
- JR = Junior Accelerator Programme entrant
- CO = College Accelerator Programme entrant
- NG = Next Gen Accelerator Program entrant
- w/o = Walkover
- r = Retired
- d = Defaulted

=== Finals ===
Semifinals
8	(United Kingdom) Jacob Fearnley	6	6
3	(France) Harold Mayot	4	2
4	(France) Quentin Halys	6	7^{7}
2	(France) Constant Lestienne	4	6^{4}

Final
8	(United Kingdom) Jacob Fearnley	0	7^{7}	6
4	(France) Quentin Halys	6	6^{5}	3

=== Top half ===
First round
1/WC	(France) A Mannarino	6	6
(France) M Bourgue	1	2
Q	(Germany) M Wiskandt	4	6	3
Q	(Georgia (country)) N Basilashvili	6	3	6
(France) G Blancaneaux	4	4
WC	(France) S Gueymard Wayenburg	6	6
(France) B Paire	1	0
8	(United Kingdom) J Fearnley	6	6
3	(France) H Mayot	6	6
(France) M Janvier	3	4
Q	(France) A Bouquier	2	7^{7}	6
PR	(France) E Furness	6	6^{5}	4
WC	(France) L Lokoli	2	2^{r}
Alt	(Belgium) M Geerts	6	4
(Syria) H Naw	3	6	4
5	(France) B Bonzi	6	4	6

Second round
1/WC	(France) A Mannarino	7^{7}	3	6
Q	(Georgia (country)) N Basilashvili	6^{5}	6	3
WC	(France) S Gueymard Wayenburg	6	2	4
8	(United Kingdom) J Fearnley	1	6	6
3	(France) H Mayot	6	6
Q	(France) A Bouquier	4	3
Alt	(Belgium) M Geerts	6	6
5	(France) B Bonzi	4	4

Quarterfinals
1/WC	(France) A Mannarino	3	3
8	(United Kingdom) J Fearnley	6	6
3	(France) H Mayot	6	6
Alt	(Belgium) M Geerts	2	4

Semifinals
8	(United Kingdom) J Fearnley	6	6
3	(France) H Mayot	4	2

=== Bottom half ===
First round
6	(France) T Droguet	6	6
Q	(Canada) S Diez	3	4
Q	(France) K de Schepper	6^{1}	3
(France) H Grenier	7^{7}	6
Q	(Ivory Coast) E Coulibaly	0	1
(France) M Martineau	6	6
(United States) M Damm	7^{7}	6^{4}	2
4	(France) Q Halys	6^{5}	7^{7}	6
7	(France) L Pouille	6	6
(France) C Hemery	3	4
(France) A Escoffier	7^{7}	4	7^{7}
(United Kingdom) L Broady	6^{4}	6	6^{5}
(Germany) D Masur	6	2	5
(France) Jules Marie	4	6	7
(France) R Bertrand	6	3	3
2	(France) C Lestienne	2	6	6

Second round
6	(France) T Droguet	3	7^{7}	7
(France) H Grenier	6	6^{3}	5
(France) M Martineau	6^{2}	6^{2}
4	(France) Q Halys	7^{7}	7^{7}
7	(France) L Pouille	6	6
(France) A Escoffier	3	3
(France) J Marie	5	1
2	(France) C Lestienne	7	6

Quarterfinals
6	(France) T Droguet	6^{11}	1
4	(France) Q Halys	7^{13}	6
7	(France) L Pouille	6	3	6^{4}
2	(France) C Lestienne	3	6	7^{7}

Semifinals
4	(France) Q Halys	6	7^{7}
2	(France) C Lestienne	4	6^{4}
