= 2026 Hall of Fame Open =

- Date: July 6–12
- Edition: 50th (men); 2nd (women)
- Category: ATP Challenger Tour 125 (men); WTA 125 (women)
- Prize money: $225,000
- Surface: Grass / outdoor
- Location: Newport, Rhode Island, United States
- Venue: International Tennis Hall of Fame

Champions

Men's singles
- (United Kingdom) Jacob Fearnley

Women's singles
- (Germany) Tatjana Maria

Men's doubles
- (New Zealand) Finn Reynolds / (New Zealand) James Watt

Women's doubles
- Iryna Shymanovich / (United States) Katie Volynets
- Hall of Fame Open

The 2026 Hall of Fame Open, sponsored by Cerity Partners, was a combined men's and women's professional tennis tournament played on outdoor grass courts. It was the 50th edition of the men's event and the second edition of the women's event. The tournament was classified as an ATP Challenger Tour 125 event on the 2026 ATP Challenger Tour and a 2026 WTA 125 tournament. It took place at the International Tennis Hall of Fame in Newport, Rhode Island, United States, from July 6 through July 12, 2026.

== ATP singles main-draw entrants ==
=== Seeds ===
Country	Player	Rank^{1}	Seed
FRA	Adrian Mannarino	40	1
USA	Alex Michelsen	46	2
~~USA~~	~~Jenson Brooksby~~	~~81~~	~~3~~
AUS	Adam Walton	85	4
CHN	Wu Yibing	102	5
AUS	Aleksandar Vukic	104	6
CHN	Bu Yunchaokete	107	7
FRA	Arthur Géa	136	8

- ^{1} Rankings are as of 29 June 2026.

=== Other entrants ===
The following players received wildcards into the main draw:

- (United States) Murphy Cassone
- (France) Adrian Mannarino
- (United States) Alex Michelsen

The following player received entry into the singles main draw as a special exempt:

- (United States) Braden Shick

The following players received entry into the singles main draw as alternates:

- (Japan) Rio Noguchi
- (Japan) Kaichi Uchida

The following players received entry from the qualifying draw:

- (United States) Andre Ilagan
- (Chinese Taipei) Jason Jung
- (United States) Stefan Kozlov
- (United States) Patrick Maloney
- (United States) Daniel Milavsky
- (United States) Tyler Zink

The following players received entry as lucky losers:

- (United States) Garrett Johns
- (Japan) Hayato Matsuoka

== WTA singles main draw entrants ==
=== Seeds ===
Country	Player	Rank^{1}	Seed
CZE	Darja Vidmanova	92	1
GER	Tatjana Maria	96	2
USA	Katie Volynets	101	3
USA	Mary Stoiana	130	4
ITA	Lucrezia Stefanini	163	5
THA	Mananchaya Sawangkaew	164	6
USA	Elizabeth Mandlik	165	7
CAN	Kayla Cross	197	8

- ^{1} Rankings are as of 29 June 2026.

=== Other entrants ===
The following players received wildcards into the main draw:

- (United States) Reese Brantmeier
- (United States) Kylie Collins
- (United States) Olivia Lincer
- (United States) Lea Ma

The following players received entry from the qualifying draw:

- (Canada) Ariana Arseneault
- (Japan) Momoko Kobori
- (United States) Alana Smith
- (India) Sahaja Yamalapalli

=== Withdrawals ===
Before the tournament

- (Georgia (country)) Mariam Bolkvadze → replaced by (Canada) Katherine Sebov
- (United States) Fiona Crawley → replaced by (United States) Carolyn Ansari
- (United Kingdom) Harriet Dart → replaced by (United States) Madison Brengle
- (Australia) Storm Hunter → replaced by (United States) Anna Rogers
- (United States) Elvina Kalieva → replaced by (United States) Katrina Scott
- (Serbia) Teodora Kostović → replaced by (Japan) Sayaka Ishii
- (United States) Ashlyn Krueger → replaced by (Mexico) Ana Sofía Sánchez
- (United States) Caty McNally → replaced by (United States) Clervie Ngounoue
- (United States) Alycia Parks → replaced by (United States) Sachia Vickery
- (Australia) Taylah Preston → replaced by (Canada) Carol Zhao
- (Czech Republic) Vendula Valdmannová → replaced by (Japan) Hayu Kinoshita
- (China) Zhang Shuai → replaced by (Japan) Mei Yamaguchi

=== Retirements ===
- (United States) Clervie Ngounoue (dizziness)

== WTA doubles main draw entrants ==
=== Seeds ===
Country	Player	Country	Player	Rank	Seed
JPN	Momoko Kobori	THA	Peangtarn Plipuech	204	1
CAN	Kayla Cross	USA	Anna Rogers	259	2
CAN	Ariana Arseneault		Ekaterina Ovcharenko	339	3
IND	Ankita Raina	IND	Prarthana Thombare	375	4

- Rankings are as of 29 June 2026.

=== Withdrawals ===
- (Japan) Hiroko Kuwata / (United States) Clervie Ngounoue (Ngounoue - dizziness)

== Champions ==
=== Men's singles ===
- (United Kingdom) Jacob Fearnley def. (Australia) Adam Walton 5–7, 7–6^{(10–8)}, 6–4.

=== Women's singles ===
- (Germany) Tatjana Maria def. (United States) Katie Volynets 6–2, 6–4.

=== Men's doubles ===
- (New Zealand) Finn Reynolds / (New Zealand) James Watt def. (Brazil) Fernando Romboli / (Australia) John-Patrick Smith 6–1, 6–7^{(2–7)}, [10–6].

=== Women's doubles ===
- Iryna Shymanovich / (United States) Katie Volynets def. (United States) Savannah Broadus / (United States) Kylie Collins 6–2, 7–6^{(8–6)}
