= 2024 Open de Rennes – Doubles =

Doubles
- 2024 Open de Rennes

Final
- Champions: (Netherlands) Sander Arends (France) Grégoire Jacq
- Runners-up: (France) Antoine Escoffier (United Kingdom) Joshua Paris
- Score: 6–4, 6–2

Events
Singles	Doubles
- Open de Rennes

Sander Arends and David Pel were the defending champions but only Arends chose to defend his title, partnering Grégoire Jacq. Arends successfully defended his title after he and Jacq defeated Antoine Escoffier and Joshua Paris 6–4, 6–2 in the final.

== Seeds ==
1. (Netherlands) Sander Arends / (France) Grégoire Jacq (champions)
2. (United States) George Goldhoff / (Brazil) Fernando Romboli (quarterfinals)
3. (United Kingdom) Ben Jones / (United Kingdom) Marcus Willis (quarterfinals)
4. (India) Anirudh Chandrasekar / (Spain) David Vega Hernández (quarterfinals)

== Draw ==
Key

- Q = Qualifier
- WC = Wild card
- LL = Lucky loser
- Alt = Alternate
- ITF = ITF entry
- PR = Protected ranking
- SR = Special ranking
- SE = Special exempt
- JE = Junior exempt
- JR = Junior Accelerator Programme entrant
- CO = College Accelerator Programme entrant
- NG = Next Gen Accelerator Program entrant
- w/o = Walkover
- r = Retired
- d = Defaulted

=== Draw ===
First round
1	(Netherlands) S Arends (France) G Jacq	6	4	[10]
(France) G Blancaneaux (France) C Hemery	1	6	[8]
(United States) M Damm (United States) V Kirkov	7	6
(Belgium) M Geerts (India) D Sharan	5	4
3	(United Kingdom) B Jones (United Kingdom) M Willis	6	6
(France) B Paire (France) L Sanchez	1	3
PR	(France) E Furness (France) A Reymond	4	6	[11]
(Croatia) Z Babić (Germany) Niklas Schell	6	1	[9]
WC	(France) Axel Garcian (France) H Mayot	6	6
(Germany) D Masur (Germany) K Wehnelt	2	2
(Ukraine) V Uzhylovskyi (Italy) Augusto Virgili	2	4
4	(India) A Chandrasekar (Spain) D Vega Hernández	6	6
(France) A Escoffier (United Kingdom) J Paris	6	6
WC	(France) Maxence Beaugé (France) Lucas Bouquet	3	1
I Liutarevich (Austria) D Pichler	6^{6}	5
2	(United States) G Goldhoff (Brazil) F Romboli	7^{8}	7

Quarterfinals
1	(Netherlands) S Arends (France) G Jacq	6	6
(United States) M Damm (United States) V Kirkov	4	4
3	(United Kingdom) B Jones (United Kingdom) M Willis	5	6^{12}
PR	(France) E Furness (France) A Reymond	7	7^{14}
WC	(France) A Garcian (France) H Mayot	6	6
4	(India) A Chandrasekar (Spain) D Vega Hernández	3	4
(France) A Escoffier (United Kingdom) J Paris	6	7^{8}
2	(United States) G Goldhoff (Brazil) F Romboli	3	6^{6}

Semifinals
1	(Netherlands) S Arends (France) G Jacq	6	6
PR	(France) E Furness (France) A Reymond	2	1
WC	(France) A Garcian (France) H Mayot	4	2
(France) A Escoffier (United Kingdom) J Paris	6	6

Final
1	(Netherlands) S Arends (France) G Jacq	6	6
(France) A Escoffier (United Kingdom) J Paris	4	2
