= 2026 Hall of Fame Open – Men's singles =

Men's singles
- 2026 Hall of Fame Open

Final
- Champion: (United Kingdom) Jacob Fearnley
- Runner-up: (Australia) Adam Walton
- Score: 5–7, 7–6^{(10–8)}, 6–4

Events
Singles	men	women
Doubles	men	women
- Hall of Fame Open

Zachary Svajda was the defending champion but chose not to defend his title.

Jacob Fearnley won the title after defeating Adam Walton 5–7, 7–6^{(10–8)}, 6–4 in the final.

== Seeds ==
1. (France) Adrian Mannarino (second round)
2. (United States) Alex Michelsen (semifinals)
3. (United States) Jenson Brooksby (withdrew)
4. (Australia) Adam Walton (final)
5. (China) Wu Yibing (first round)
6. (Australia) Aleksandar Vukic (first round)
7. (China) Bu Yunchaokete (second round)
8. (France) Arthur Géa (quarterfinals)

== Draw ==
Key

- Q = Qualifier
- WC = Wild card
- LL = Lucky loser
- Alt = Alternate
- ITF = ITF entry
- PR = Protected ranking
- SR = Special ranking
- SE = Special exempt
- JE = Junior exempt
- JR = Junior Accelerator Programme entrant
- CO = College Accelerator Programme entrant
- NG = Next Gen Accelerator Program entrant
- w/o = Walkover
- r = Retired
- d = Defaulted

=== Finals ===
Semifinals
(Canada) Alexis Galarneau	7^{7}	3	4
(United Kingdom) Jacob Fearnley	6^{2}	6	6
4	(Australia) Adam Walton	7^{7}	6
2/WC	(United States) Alex Michelsen	6^{2}	4

Final
(United Kingdom) Jacob Fearnley	5	7^{10}	6
4	(Australia) Adam Walton	7	6^{8}	4

=== Top half ===
First round
1/WC	(France) A Mannarino	6	6
(Switzerland) R Bertola	2	1
(Canada) A Galarneau	4	6	7^{7}
(Argentina) JP Ficovich	6	4	6^{4}
Q	(United States) D Milavsky	6	6
Alt	(Japan) K Uchida	4	3
(Estonia) D Glinka	4	4
7	(China) Y Bu	6	6
LL	(United States) G Johns	3	6	6
Q	(United States) Patrick Maloney	6	3	4
WC	(United States) M Cassone	4	6	3
(United States) Dar Blanch	6	1	6
(United Kingdom) J Fearnley	7	3	6
(Estonia) M Lajal	5	6	1
Q	(United States) S Kozlov	6	2	6
5	(China) Y Wu	4	6	4

Second round
1/WC	(France) A Mannarino	3	6	6^{5}
(Canada) A Galarneau	6	3	7^{7}
Q	(United States) D Milavsky	6	6
7	(China) Y Bu	2	1
LL	(United States) G Johns	7	3	3
(United States) Dar Blanch	5	6	6
(United Kingdom) J Fearnley	3	6	6
Q	(United States) S Kozlov	6	3	2

Quarterfinals
(Canada) A Galarneau	6	6
Q	(United States) D Milavsky	3	2
(United States) Dar Blanch	3	3
(United Kingdom) J Fearnley	6	6

Semifinals
(Canada) A Galarneau	7^{7}	3	4
(United Kingdom) J Fearnley	6^{2}	6	6

=== Bottom half ===
First round
8	(France) A Géa	6	6
Q	(United States) T Zink	2	3
(Denmark) A Holmgren	3	7^{7}	3
(Australia) T Schoolkate	6	6^{3}	6
(Australia) B Tomic	6	6
SE	(United States) B Shick	2	3
(United States) M McDonald	1	3
4	(Australia) A Walton	6	6
6	(Australia) A Vukic	6^{4}	3
(United Kingdom) L Broady	7^{7}	6
Q	(United States) Andre Ilagan	7	3	6
Alt	(Japan) R Noguchi	5	6	3
(Australia) J McCabe	4	3
Q	(Chinese Taipei) J Jung	6	6
LL	(Japan) H Matsuoka	1	4
2/WC	(United States) A Michelsen	6	6

Second round
8	(France) A Géa	4	7^{9}	7
(Australia) T Schoolkate	6	6^{7}	5
(Australia) B Tomic	4	6	2
4	(Australia) A Walton	6	4	6
(United Kingdom) L Broady	6	7^{7}
Q	(United States) A Ilagan	3	6^{2}
Q	(Chinese Taipei) J Jung	1	3
2/WC	(United States) A Michelsen	6	6

Quarterfinals
8	(France) A Géa	4	4
4	(Australia) A Walton	6	6
(United Kingdom) L Broady	3	6^{6}
2/WC	(United States) A Michelsen	6	7^{8}

Semifinals
4	(Australia) A Walton	7^{7}	6
2/WC	(United States) A Michelsen	6^{2}	4
