= 2024 Open d'Orléans =

- Date: 23 – 29 September
- Edition: 19th
- Surface: Hard (Indoor)
- Location: Orléans, France

Champions

Singles
- (United Kingdom) Jacob Fearnley

Doubles
- (France) Benjamin Bonzi / (France) Sascha Gueymard Wayenburg
← 2023 ·	Open d'Orléans	· 2025 →

The 2024 CO'Met Orléans Open was a professional tennis tournament played on indoor hardcourts. It was the 19th edition of the tournament which was part of the 2024 ATP Challenger Tour. It took place in Orléans, France between 23 and 29 September 2024.

== Singles main-draw entrants ==
=== Seeds ===
Country	Player	Rank^{1}	Seed
FRA	Quentin Halys	98	1
CAN	Denis Shapovalov	101	2
FRA	Constant Lestienne	103	3
FRA	Luca Van Assche	111	4
FRA	Harold Mayot	118	5
FRA	Richard Gasquet	122	6
FRA	Pierre-Hugues Herbert	128	7
GBR	Jacob Fearnley	129	8

- ^{1} Rankings are as of 16 September 2024.

=== Other entrants ===
The following players received wildcards into the singles main draw:

- (France) Robin Bertrand
- (France) Antoine Escoffier
- (Slovakia) Norbert Gombos

The following players received entry from the qualifying draw:

- (Ivory Coast) Eliakim Coulibaly
- (France) Jonathan Eysseric
- (Estonia) Mark Lajal
- (France) Tristan Lamasine
- Alexey Vatutin
- (Italy) Samuel Vincent Ruggeri

The following player received entry as a lucky loser:

- (France) Maxime Janvier

== Champions ==
=== Singles ===
- (United Kingdom) Jacob Fearnley def. (France) Harold Mayot 6–3, 7–6^{(7–5)}.

=== Doubles ===
- (France) Benjamin Bonzi / (France) Sascha Gueymard Wayenburg def. (France) Manuel Guinard / (France) Grégoire Jacq 7–6^{(9–7)}, 4–6, [10–5].
