= 2026 Hall of Fame Open – Women's singles =

Women's singles
- 2026 Hall of Fame Open

Final
- Champion: (Germany) Tatjana Maria
- Runner-up: (United States) Katie Volynets
- Score: 6–2, 6–4

Events
Singles	men	women
Doubles	men	women
- Hall of Fame Open

Tatjana Maria won the title, defeating Katie Volynets 6–2, 6–4 in the final.

Caty McNally was the reigning champion, but withdrew from the tournament as she was still participating at Wimbledon.

== Seeds ==
1. (Czech Republic) Darja Vidmanova (second round)
2. (Germany) Tatjana Maria (champion)
3. (United States) Katie Volynets (final)
4. (United States) Mary Stoiana (quarterfinals)
5. (Italy) Lucrezia Stefanini (quarterfinals)
6. (Thailand) Mananchaya Sawangkaew (semifinals)
7. (United States) Elizabeth Mandlik (quarterfinals)
8. (Canada) Kayla Cross (second round)

== Draw ==
Key

- Q = Qualifier
- WC = Wild card
- LL = Lucky loser
- Alt = Alternate
- ITF = ITF entry
- PR = Protected ranking
- SR = Special ranking
- SE = Special exempt
- JE = Junior exempt
- JR = Junior Accelerator Programme entrant
- CO = College Accelerator Programme entrant
- NG = Next Gen Accelerator Program entrant
- w/o = Walkover
- r = Retired
- d = Defaulted

=== Finals ===
Semifinals
(Belgium) Greet Minnen	3	2
3	(United States) Katie Volynets	6	6
6	(Thailand) Mananchaya Sawangkaew	2	1
2	(Germany) Tatjana Maria	6	6

Final
3	(United States) Katie Volynets	2	4
2	(Germany) Tatjana Maria	6	6

=== Top half ===
First round
1	(Czech Republic) D Vidmanova	6	6
(United States) C Ansari	3	1
(Japan) M Yamaguchi	5	3
(Belgium) G Minnen	7	6
(United States) M Brengle	7	6
(Mexico) AS Sánchez	5	3
(Japan) S Ishii	2	3
8	(Canada) K Cross	6	6
3	(United States) K Volynets	3	6	6
Q	(Canada) A Arseneault	6	1	1
WC	(United States) K Collins	6	6
Q	(United States) A Smith	4	4
(United States) S Vickery	1	4
WC	(United States) R Brantmeier	6	6
Q	(Japan) M Kobori	1	4
7	(United States) E Mandlik	6	6

Second round
1	(Czech Republic) D Vidmanova	6^{2}	6	1
(Belgium) G Minnen	7^{7}	4	6
(United States) M Brengle	6	6
8	(Canada) K Cross	3	1
3	(United States) K Volynets	6	6
WC	(United States) K Collins	3	4
WC	(United States) R Brantmeier	3	6	2
7	(United States) E Mandlik	6	4	6

Quarterfinals
(Belgium) G Minnen	7	6
(United States) M Brengle	5	0
3	(United States) K Volynets	3	6	6
7	(United States) E Mandlik	6	4	3

Semifinals
(Belgium) G Minnen	3	2
3	(United States) K Volynets	6	6

=== Bottom half ===
First round
6	(Thailand) M Sawangkaew	6	6
(United States) C Dolehide	3	4
WC	(United States) L Ma	6	6
(United States) C Ngounoue	4	6^{r}
I Shymanovich	6	6
(Japan) H Kinoshita	3	2
(United States) K Scott	2	2
4	(United States) M Stoiana	6	6
5	(Italy) L Stefanini	6	6
(Canada) C Zhao	3	1
Q	(India) S Yamalapalli	6^{5}	4
(United States) A Rogers	7^{7}	6
(Canada) K Sebov	6	6
(Canada) C Brace	2	2
WC	(United States) O Lincer	3	2
2	(Germany) T Maria	6	6

Second round
6	(Thailand) M Sawangkaew	6	6
WC	(United States) L Ma	2	3
I Shymanovich	6	2	3
4	(United States) M Stoiana	3	6	6
5	(Italy) L Stefanini	6	6
(United States) A Rogers	2	1
(Canada) K Sebov	3	3
2	(Germany) T Maria	6	6

Quarterfinals
6	(Thailand) M Sawangkaew	3	6	7
4	(United States) M Stoiana	6	2	5
5	(Italy) L Stefanini	1	0
2	(Germany) T Maria	6	6

Semifinals
6	(Thailand) M Sawangkaew	2	1
2	(Germany) T Maria	6	6

== Qualifying ==
=== Seeds ===
1. (Japan) Momoko Kobori (qualified)
2. (India) Sahaja Yamalapalli (qualified)
3. (United States) Alana Smith (qualified)
4. (Canada) Ariana Arseneault (qualified)

=== Qualifiers ===
1. (Japan) Momoko Kobori
2. (India) Sahaja Yamalapalli
3. (United States) Alana Smith
4. (Canada) Ariana Arseneault

=== Qualifying draw ===
==== First qualifier ====
Qualifying competition
1	(Japan) Momoko Kobori	6	4	6
	(United States) Mary Lewis	2	6	0

==== Second qualifier ====
Qualifying competition
2	(India) Sahaja Yamalapalli	6	6
	Ekaterina Ovcharenko	3	4

==== Third qualifier ====
Qualifying competition
3	(United States) Alana Smith	6	7
WC	(United States) Sydney Jara	2	5

==== Fourth qualifier ====
Qualifying competition
4	(Canada) Ariana Arseneault	7	7
WC	(United States) Victoria Osuigwe	5	5
