= 2026 Hall of Fame Open – Men's doubles =

Men's doubles
- 2026 Hall of Fame Open

Final
- Champions: (New Zealand) Finn Reynolds (New Zealand) James Watt
- Runners-up: (Brazil) Fernando Romboli (Australia) John-Patrick Smith
- Score: 6–1, 6–7^{(2–7)}, [10–6]

Events
Singles	men	women
Doubles	men	women
- Hall of Fame Open

Robert Cash and JJ Tracy were the defending champions but chose not to defend their title.

Finn Reynolds and James Watt won the title after defeating Fernando Romboli and John-Patrick Smith 6–1, 6–7^{(2–7)}, [10–6] in the final.

== Seeds ==
1. (Brazil) Fernando Romboli / (Australia) John-Patrick Smith (final)
2. (New Zealand) Finn Reynolds / (New Zealand) James Watt (champions)
3. (Thailand) Pruchya Isaro / (India) Niki Kaliyanda Poonacha (semifinals)
4. (Australia) Patrick Harper / (United States) Mac Kiger (first round, withdrew)

== Draw ==
Key

- Q = Qualifier
- WC = Wild card
- LL = Lucky loser
- Alt = Alternate
- ITF = ITF entry
- PR = Protected ranking
- SR = Special ranking
- SE = Special exempt
- JE = Junior exempt
- JR = Junior Accelerator Programme entrant
- CO = College Accelerator Programme entrant
- NG = Next Gen Accelerator Program entrant
- w/o = Walkover
- r = Retired
- d = Defaulted

First round
1	(Brazil) F Romboli (Australia) J-P Smith	6	6
(Japan) R Noguchi (Japan) S Watanabe	3	4
WC	(United States) A Rybakov (United States) T Zink	2	2
(Chinese Taipei) J Jung (United States) M McDonald	6	6
4	(Australia) P Harper (United States) M Kiger
PR	(Mexico) H Hach Verdugo (Venezuela) LD Martínez	w/o
(United States) N Lammons (United States) J Withrow	3	6	[10]
(Australia) B Bayldon (United States) T Hilderbrand	6	3	[8]
(United States) G Goldhoff (Canada) C Harper	4	4
(South Korea) J-s Nam (Finland) P Niklas-Salminen	6	6
WC	(Venezuela) Juan José Bianchi (United States) D Milavsky	6	3	[6]
3	(Thailand) P Isaro (India) N Kaliyanda Poonacha	3	6	[10]
Alt	(United Kingdom) L Broady (India) S Myneni	6	6
(Antigua and Barbuda) J Maginley (Australia) T Schoolkate	1	4
(Australia) K Pearson (Australia) C Puttergill	6^{5}	4
2	(New Zealand) F Reynolds (New Zealand) J Watt	7^{7}	6

Quarterfinals
1	(Brazil) F Romboli (Australia) J-P Smith	7^{7}	6
(Chinese Taipei) J Jung (United States) M McDonald	6^{5}	4
PR	(Mexico) H Hach Verdugo (Venezuela) LD Martínez	3	4
(United States) N Lammons (United States) J Withrow	6	6
(South Korea) J-s Nam (Finland) P Niklas-Salminen	3	4
3	(Thailand) P Isaro (India) N Kaliyanda Poonacha	6	6
Alt	(United Kingdom) L Broady (India) S Myneni	4	5
2	(New Zealand) F Reynolds (New Zealand) J Watt	6	7

Semifinals
1	(Brazil) F Romboli (Australia) J-P Smith	6	6
(United States) N Lammons (United States) J Withrow	4	4
3	(Thailand) P Isaro (India) N Kaliyanda Poonacha	6	4	[3]
2	(New Zealand) F Reynolds (New Zealand) J Watt	2	6	[10]

Final
1	(Brazil) F Romboli (Australia) J-P Smith	1	7^{7}	[6]
2	(New Zealand) F Reynolds (New Zealand) J Watt	6	6^{2}	[10]
