= 2024 Open d'Orléans – Singles =

Tennis tournament in France

Singles
- 2024 Open d'Orléans

Final
- Champion: (United Kingdom) Jacob Fearnley
- Runner-up: (France) Harold Mayot
- Score: 6–3, 7–6^{(7–5)}

Events
Singles	Doubles
← 2023 ·	Open d'Orléans	· 2025 →

Tomáš Macháč was the defending champion but chose not to defend his title.

Jacob Fearnley won the title after defeating Harold Mayot 6–3, 7–6^{(7–5)} in the final.

== Seeds ==
1. (France) Quentin Halys (first round)
2. (Canada) Denis Shapovalov (second round)
3. (France) Constant Lestienne (first round)
4. (France) Luca Van Assche (first round)
5. (France) Harold Mayot (final)
6. (France) Richard Gasquet (first round)
7. (France) Pierre-Hugues Herbert (second round)
8. (United Kingdom) Jacob Fearnley (champion)

== Draw ==
=== Key ===
- Q = Qualifier
- WC = Wild card
- LL = Lucky loser
- Alt = Alternate
- ITF = ITF entry
- PR = Protected ranking
- SR = Special ranking
- SE = Special exempt
- JE = Junior exempt
- JR = Junior Accelerator Programme entrant
- CO = College Accelerator Programme entrant
- NG = Next Gen Accelerator Program entrant
- w/o = Walkover
- r = Retired
- d = Defaulted

=== Finals ===
Semifinals
5	(France) Harold Mayot	6	6
(Switzerland) Marc-Andrea Hüsler	4	3
8	(United Kingdom) Jacob Fearnley	6	6
(Belgium) Alexander Blockx	4	3

Final
5	(France) Harold Mayot	3	6^{5}
8	(United Kingdom) Jacob Fearnley	6	7^{7}

=== Top half ===
First round
1	(France) Q Halys	6^{8}	6	6^{6}
Q	(Ivory Coast) E Coulibaly	7^{10}	4	7^{8}
(France) B Bonzi	6	6
(Austria) J Rodionov	4	2
Q	(Italy) Samuel Vincent Ruggeri	2	2
WC	(France) A Escoffier	6	6
(Poland) K Majchrzak	4	6	6^{1}
5	(France) H Mayot	6	4	7^{7}
4	(France) L Van Assche	6	3	1
(Croatia) B Gojo	4	6	6
Q	A Vatutin	4	2
(Serbia) H Medjedovic	6	6
(Switzerland) M-A Hüsler	6	6
Q	(France) T Lamasine	2	2
(France) G Barrère	6^{4}	6	1
7	(France) P-H Herbert	7^{7}	1	6

Second round
Q	(Ivory Coast) E Coulibaly	0	0
(France) B Bonzi	6	6
WC	(France) A Escoffier	4	6^{4}
5	(France) H Mayot	6	7^{7}
(Croatia) B Gojo	7^{7}	3	2
(Serbia) H Medjedovic	6^{4}	6	6
(Switzerland) M-A Hüsler	6	6
7	(France) P-H Herbert	4	2

Quarterfinals
(France) B Bonzi	4	4
5	(France) H Mayot	6	6
(Serbia) H Medjedovic	6^{4}	0
(Switzerland) M-A Hüsler	7^{7}	6

Semifinals
5	(France) H Mayot	6	6
(Switzerland) M-A Hüsler	4	3

=== Bottom half ===
First round
8	(United Kingdom) J Fearnley	6	3	6
Q	(France) J Eysseric	2	6	1
(United States) M Damm	6	4	6^{4}
WC	(France) R Bertrand	2	6	7^{7}
LL	(France) M Janvier	6^{4}	5
(France) H Grenier	7^{7}	7
(Italy) M Gigante	6	6^{2}	6
3	(France) C Lestienne	4	7^{7}	4
6	(France) R Gasquet	6^{3}	3
(France) C Hemery	7^{7}	6
Q	(Estonia) M Lajal	4	7	6
(France) M Martineau	6	5	3
(Belgium) A Blockx	6	6
WC	(Slovakia) N Gombos	1	4
(Lebanon) B Hassan	3	1
2	(Canada) D Shapovalov	6	6

Second round
8	(United Kingdom) J Fearnley	6	6
WC	(France) R Bertrand	3	3
(France) H Grenier	4	5
(Italy) M Gigante	6	7
(France) C Hemery	4	6	6^{3}
Q	(Estonia) M Lajal	6	3	7^{7}
(Belgium) A Blockx	6	6^{5}	6
2	(Canada) D Shapovalov	4	7^{7}	2

Quarterfinals
8	(United Kingdom) J Fearnley	6	6
(Italy) M Gigante	1	0
Q	(Estonia) M Lajal	3	3
(Belgium) A Blockx	6	6

Semifinals
8	(United Kingdom) J Fearnley	6	6
(Belgium) A Blockx	4	3
