= Jacob Fearnley =

British tennis player (born 2001)

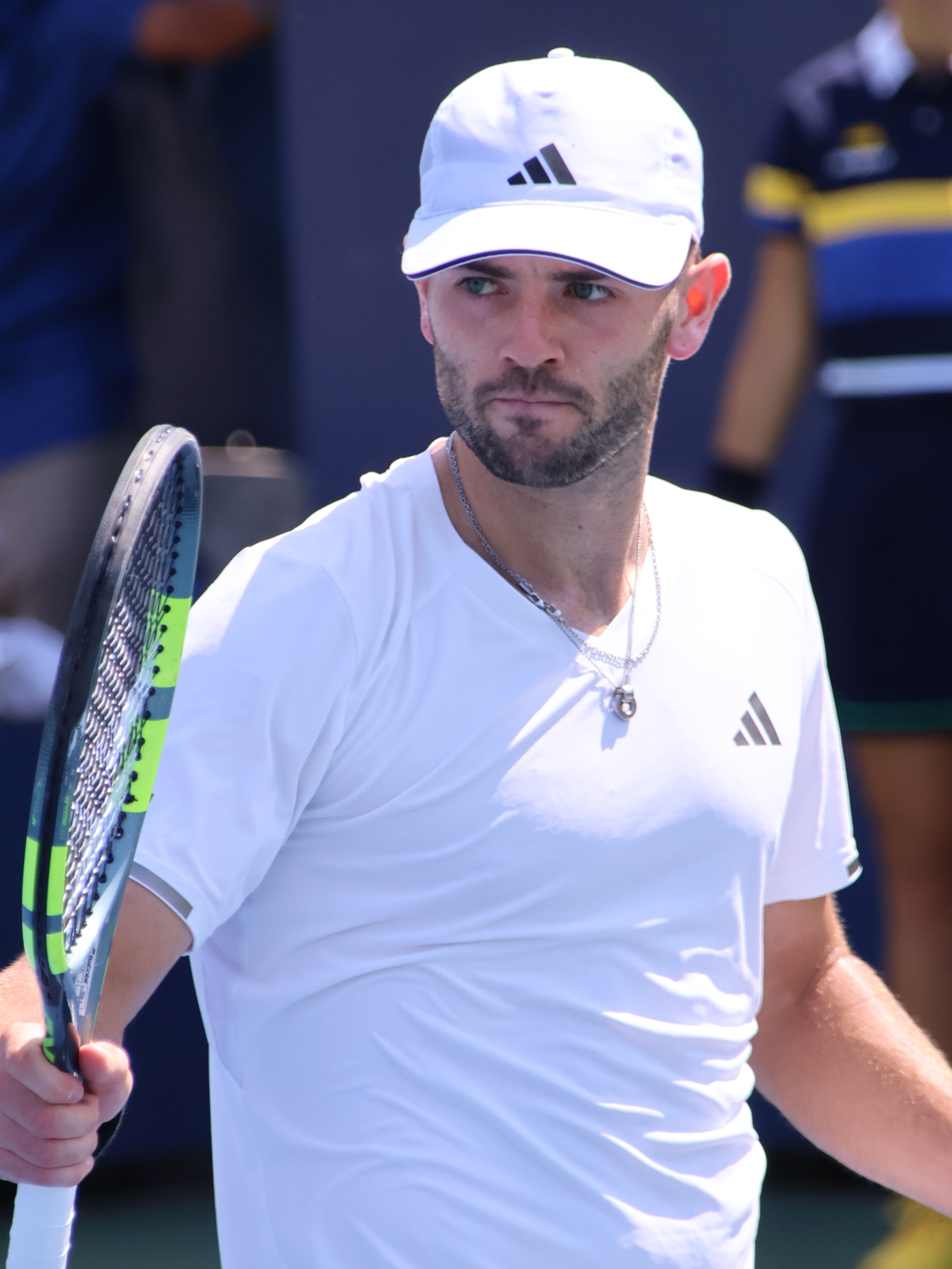
- Fearnley at the 2026 US Open
- Country (sports): (United Kingdom) Great Britain
- Born: 15 July 2001 (age 25) Worcester, England
- Height: 1.83 m (6 ft 0 in)
- Plays: Right-handed (two-handed backhand)
- College: TCU
- Coach: Toby Smith, Juan Martín
- Prize money: US $2,267,228

Singles
- Career record: 24–34 (at ATP Tour level, Grand Slam level, and in Davis Cup)
- Career titles: 0
- Highest ranking: No. 49 (9 June 2025)
- Current ranking: No. 87 (9 November 2026)

Grand Slam singles results
- Australian Open: 3R (2025)
- French Open: 3R (2025)
- Wimbledon: 2R (2024, 2026)
- US Open: 2R (2025, 2026)

Doubles
- Career record: 4–6 (at ATP Tour level, Grand Slam level, and in Davis Cup)
- Career titles: 0
- Highest ranking: No. 211 (14 July 2025)

Grand Slam doubles results
- French Open: 2R (2025)
- Wimbledon: 2R (2023)
- Last updated on: 26 October 2026.

Jacob Fearnley (born 15 July 2001) is a British professional tennis player. He has a career-high ATP singles ranking of world No. 49 achieved on 9 June 2025 and a doubles ranking of No. 211 achieved on 14 July 2025.

== Early life ==
Fearnley was born in Worcester, England. When he was aged two, the family moved to Dalkeith, just south of Edinburgh. It was in Dalkeith where Fearnley started playing tennis aged four, with his mother and grandfather both keen tennis players. As a child he played tennis in his grandfather's back garden and on the courts of Dalkeith. He went to Merchiston Castle School.

== College career ==
Fearnley played college tennis for coach David Roditi at Texas Christian University in Fort Worth, Texas. At TCU, he earned All-Big 12 and All-America honours all four years, leading the Horned Frogs to back-to-back ITA Indoor National Championships in 2022 and 2023 and the school's first NCAA Division I men's tennis championship in 2024.

== Professional career ==
=== 2023: Major debut in doubles ===
Fearnley won his maiden ATP Challenger doubles title at the Nottingham Open with Johannus Monday. The pair received a wildcard entry into the doubles draw at Wimbledon, where they lost to sixth seeds Rohan Bopanna and Matthew Ebden in the second round.

=== 2024: Maiden Challenger title, ATP, Major and top 100 debuts ===
Fearnley won his first singles ATP Challenger title at the Nottingham Open as a qualifier, getting his first top-100 win against Shang Juncheng in the quarterfinals, and defeating compatriot Charles Broom in the final. It was only Fearnley's second appearance in the main draw of an ATP Challenger event. He became the fourth British player to win the trophy after Andy Murray (2023), Dan Evans (2019 & 2022) and Greg Rusedski (1997 & 2003).

Ranked No. 270, he made his ATP debut at the Eastbourne International as a wildcard entrant. He lost to compatriot and fellow wildcard Billy Harris.

Fearnley made his Grand Slam singles debut at Wimbledon after being awarded a wildcard entry. He recorded his first Major win over debutant Alejandro Moro Canas and moved 50 positions up into the top 225 in the rankings. In the second round, he lost to second seed Novak Djokovic in four sets.

He won his second ATP Challenger singles title at the Lincoln Challenger, defeating Coleman Wong in straight sets in the final. As a result he moved up to a new career-high ranking of No. 160 on 19 August 2024.

Following his third title at the Rennes Challenger, defeating five French players in a row, Benoît Paire in 37 minutes, wildcard Sascha Gueymard Wayenburg, wildcard and top seed Adrian Mannarino, his first Top 50 win, third seed Harold Mayot, and finally fourth seed Quentin Halys, he reached the top 130 in the rankings on 16 September 2024. After winning his fourth Challenger at the Open d'Orléans, he reached the top-100 in the rankings.

Having qualified for the Stockholm Open in October, Fearnley won his 13th match in a row and second at the ATP Tour level with a first round success against Corentin Moutet. He lost in the second round to seventh seed Tallon Griekspoor.

On 2 December 2024, Fearnley was world No. 99, having started the season at No. 646, climbing 547 positions and setting a record in the ATP singles rankings for the year.

=== 2025: Major & Masters third rounds, Davis Cup & top 50 debuts ===
For the first time in his career, Fearnley gained direct admission into a Grand Slam tournament main draw, entering the Australian Open with his ranking of 99 after the withdrawal of Sebastian Ofner. Wins over Nick Kyrgios and Arthur Cazaux saw him reach the third round, where his run was ended by second seed Alexander Zverev.

Fearnley made his debut for the Great Britain Davis Cup Team in their qualifier against Japan, defeating Kei Nishikori. He then lost to Yoshihito Nishioka as Japan won the tie 3-2.

In March, Fearnley made his first ATP Masters 1000 main draw appearance at Indian Wells, but lost in the opening round to João Fonseca in three sets. He followed this up by qualifying for the Miami Open, where he defeated Benjamin Bonzi in the first round. Fearnley lost in the second round to top seed Alexander Zverev in a repeat of their match from the Australian Open earlier in the year.

Fearnley entered the Barcelona Open in April as a lucky loser and defeated Roberto Carballés Baena in the first round to claim his maiden ATP Tour clay-court win. He lost his next match to fifth seed Alex de Minaur. Fearnley qualified for the Madrid Open and overcame Yunchaokete Bu to reach the second round, where he defeated 19th seed Tomáš Macháč to record his first win over a top-20 ranked player. He lost to 15th seed Grigor Dimitrov in the third round.

In May at the Italian Open, Fearnley defeated wildcard entrant Fabio Fognini, before losing to 29th seed Matteo Berrettini in the second round. At the Geneva Open he defeated wildcard entrant Dušan Lajović to reach the second round, where he lost to fifth seed Alexei Popyrin.

At the French Open, Fearnley defeated Stan Wawrinka in the first round. He then advanced to the third round when his next opponent, 22nd seed Ugo Humbert, retired due to injury. Fearnley lost his next match to Cameron Norrie in three sets. As a result he made his top 50 debut at world No. 49 on 9 June 2025.

In June at the Queen's Club Championships in London, Fearnley defeated qualifiers Alex Bolt and Corentin Moutet to reach his first ATP Tour quarterfinal, which he lost to Jiří Lehečka. The following week at the Eastbourne Open, he overcame fifth seed Flavio Cobolli in the first round, but lost his next match to Marcos Giron. Fearnley then moved on to Wimbledon, where he lost to João Fonseca in the first round.

Making his main-draw debut at the US Open, Fearnley defeated Roberto Bautista Agut in the first round, before losing to third seed Alexander Zverev.

=== 2026: Masters win, out of top 150 ===
Fearnley lost to Kamil Majchrzak in the first round of the Australian Open. In March at the Indian Wells Open, he defeated Damir Dzumhur to record his first ATP Tour main-draw win since October 2025. Fearnley lost to seventh seed Taylor Fritz in the second round. Having fallen to world No. 122 by time he arrived at the French Open in May, Fearnley dropped another significant chunk of ranking points after losing in the first round to Juan Manuel Cerúndolo and therefore failing to match his third round run from the previous year.

Given a wildcard entry into the main-draw at Wimbledon, Fearnley, now ranked at world No. 159, fought back from two sets down for the first time in his career to defeat world No. 46 Alex Michelsen, before losing to Jaume Munar in the second round. Dropping down to the Challenger circuit, he won the Hall of Fame Open, defeating fourth seed Adam Walton in the final. The following week, Fearnley reached another Challenger final at the Cranbrook Tennis Classic, but lost to top seed Alex Michelsen in straight sets. Entering the main-draw at the US Open as a lucky loser, he overcame Martin Landaluce in five sets to make it into the second round, where he was eliminated by 27th seed Tomás Martín Etcheverry.

In October, as top seed Fearnley reached the final at the Olbia Challenger, but lost to second seed Damir Džumhur. Back on the main ATP Tour the next week, he defeated Hugo Gaston to reach the second round at the European Open, at which point he lost to qualifier Clément Chidekh. Fearnley followed this by qualifying for the main-draw at the Vienna Open, but retired due to injury in the first set of his opening round match against British No. 1 Arthur Fery.

== Performance timeline ==
Key
W	F	SF	QF	#R	RR	Q#	DNQ	A	NH

(W) winner; (F) finalist; (SF) semifinalist; (QF) quarterfinalist; (#R) rounds 4, 3, 2, 1; (RR) round-robin stage; (Q#) qualification round; (DNQ) did not qualify; (A) absent; (NH) not held; (SR) strike rate (events won / competed); (W–L) win–loss record.
To avoid confusion and double counting, these charts are updated at the conclusion of a tournament or when the player's participation has ended.

=== Singles ===
Tournament	2024	2025	2026	SR	W–L	Win %
Grand Slam tournaments
Australian Open	A	3R	1R	0 / 2	2–2	50%
French Open	A	3R	1R	0 / 2	2–2	50%
Wimbledon	2R	1R	2R	0 / 2	2–3	40%
US Open	Q1	2R	2R	0 / 2	2–2	50%
Win–loss	1–1	5–4	2–4	0 / 8	8–9	47%
National representation
Davis Cup	A	WG1		0 / 2	2–1	67%
ATP Masters 1000
Indian Wells Open	A	1R	2R	0 / 2	1–2	33%
Miami Open	A	2R	1R	0 / 2	1–2	33%
Monte-Carlo Masters	A	A	A	0 / 0	0–0	–
Madrid Open	A	3R	A	0 / 1	2–1	67%
Italian Open	A	2R	1R	0 / 1	1–2	50%
Canadian Open	A	1R	2R	0 / 1	0–1	0%
Cincinnati Open	A	1R	Q1	0 / 1	0–1	0%
Shanghai Masters	A	A	A	0 / 0	0–0	–
Paris Masters	A	1R		0 / 1	0–1	0%
Win–loss	0–0	4–7	1–2	0 / 9	5–9	36%
Career statistics
Tournaments	3	20	4	27		
Overall win–loss	2–3	16–21	2–4	20–28		
Year-end ranking	99	71		42%		

== ATP Challenger Tour finals ==
=== Singles: 8 (5 titles, 3 runner-up) ===
Legend ATP Challenger Tour (5–2)	Finals by surface Hard (3–1) Grass (2–1)

Result	W–L	Date	Tournament	Tier	Surface	Opponent	Score
Win	1–0	Jun 2024	Nottingham Open, United Kingdom	Challenger	Grass	(United Kingdom) Charles Broom	4–6, 6–4, 6–3
Win	2–0	Aug 2024	Lincoln Challenger, United States	Challenger	Hard	(Hong Kong) Coleman Wong	6–4, 6–2
Win	3–0	Sep 2024	Open de Rennes, France	Challenger	Hard (i)	(France) Quentin Halys	0–6, 7–6^{(7–5)}, 6–3
Win	4–0	Sep 2024	Orléans Open, France	Challenger	Hard (i)	(France) Harold Mayot	6–3, 7–6^{(7–5)}
Loss	4–1	Jun 2026	Ilkley Open, United Kingdom	Challenger	Grass	(China) Bu Yunchaokete	3–6, 6–7^{(1–7)}
Win	5–1	Jul 2026	Hall of Fame Open, United States	Challenger	Grass	(Australia) Adam Walton	5–7, 7–6^{(10–8)}, 6–4
Loss	5–2	Jul 2026	Cranbrook Tennis Classic, United States	Challenger	Hard	(United States) Alex Michelsen	6–7^{(4–7)}, 3–6
Loss	5–3	Oct 2026	Olbia Challenger, Italy	Challenger	Hard	(Bosnia and Herzegovina) Damir Džumhur	6–7^{(4–7)}, 3–6

=== Doubles: 1 (1 title) ===
Legend ATP Challenger Tour (1–0)

Result	W–L	Date	Tournament	Tier	Surface	Partner	Opponents	Score
Win	1–0	Jun 2023	Nottingham Open, United Kingdom	Challenger	Grass	(United Kingdom) Johannus Monday	(United Kingdom) Liam Broady (United Kingdom) Jonny O'Mara	6–3, 6–7^{(6–8)}, [10–7]

== ITF World Tennis Tour finals ==
=== Singles: 4 (2 titles, 2 runners-up) ===
Legend ITF WTT (2–2)	Finals by surface Hard (2–2) Clay (0–0)

Result	W–L	Date	Tournament	Tier	Surface	Opponent	Score
Loss	0–1	Nov 2019	M15 Austin, US	WTT	Hard	(United States) Collin Altamirano	6–4, 4–6, 4–6
Win	1–1	Oct 2023	M25 Edgbaston, United Kingdom	WTT	Hard (i)	(United Kingdom) Kyle Edmund	6–3, 6–1
Loss	1–2	Nov 2023	M25 Columbus, US	WTT	Hard (i)	(United States) Learner Tien	0–2 ret.
Win	2–2	Jan 2024	M25 Esch-sur-Alzette, Luxembourg	WTT	Hard (i)	(Czech Republic) Jonáš Forejtek	6–4, 6–4

=== Doubles: 2 (2 titles) ===
Legend ITF WTT (2–0)

Result	W–L	Date	Tournament	Tier	Surface	Partner	Opponents	Score
Win	1–0	Oct 2023	M25 Edgbaston, United Kingdom	WTT	Hard (i)	(United Kingdom) Connor Thomson	(United Kingdom) David Stevenson (United Kingdom) Charles Broom	7–6^{(7–2)}, 6–7^{(5–7)}, [10–7]
Win	2–0	Jan 2024	M25 Esch-sur-Alzette, Luxembourg	WTT	Hard (i)	(United States) Alex Rybakov	(Luxembourg) Raphael Calzi (France) Amaury Reynel	6–3, 6–3

== Wins over top 10 players ==
- Jacob Fearnley has a 0–6 (0%) record against players who were, at the time the match was played, ranked in the top 10.

Season	2024	2025	Total
Wins	0	0	0
