= 2026 Hall of Fame Open – Women's doubles =

Women's doubles
- 2026 Hall of Fame Open

Final
- Champions: Iryna Shymanovich (United States) Katie Volynets
- Runners-up: (United States) Savannah Broadus (United States) Kylie Collins
- Score: 6–2, 7–6^{(8–6)}

Events
Singles	men	women
Doubles	men	women
- Hall of Fame Open

Iryna Shymanovich and Katie Volynets won the title, defeating Savannah Broadus and Kylie Collins 6–2, 7–6^{(8–6)} in the final.

Carmen and Ivana Corley were the defending champions, but only Carmen chose to compete, partnering Reese Brantmeier. They lost in the semifinals to Shymanovich and Volynets.

== Seeds ==
1. (Japan) Momoko Kobori / (Thailand) Peangtarn Plipuech (quarterfinals )
2. (Canada) Kayla Cross / (United States) Anna Rogers (first round)
3. (Canada) Ariana Arseneault / Ekaterina Ovcharenko (first round)
4. (India) Ankita Raina / (India) Prarthana Thombare (quarterfinals)

== Draw ==
Key

- Q = Qualifier
- WC = Wild card
- LL = Lucky loser
- Alt = Alternate
- ITF = ITF entry
- PR = Protected ranking
- SR = Special ranking
- SE = Special exempt
- JE = Junior exempt
- JR = Junior Accelerator Programme entrant
- CO = College Accelerator Programme entrant
- NG = Next Gen Accelerator Program entrant
- w/o = Walkover
- r = Retired
- d = Defaulted

=== Draw ===
First round
(United States) R Brantmeier (United States) C Corley	2	6	[10]
(United States) E Mandlik (United States) A Smith	6	3	[8]
4	(India) A Raina (India) P Thombare	6	5	[10]
(Canada) C Brace (United States) K Scott	0	7	[3]
I Shymanovich (United States) K Volynets	6	6
(United States) S Jara (United States) O Lincer	2	2
(Japan) H Kuwata (United States) C Ngounoue	6	7^{7}
(United States) C Ansari (Mexico) AS Sánchez	1	6^{5}
(United States) M Lewis (Canada) K Sebov	6	6
3	(Canada) A Arseneault; E Ovcharenko	1	1
(United States) S Broadus (United States) K Collins	6	6
(United States) J Daniel (United States) A Zamarripa	4	4
(Thailand) M Sawangkaew (Hong Kong) C Wong	6	3	[10]
2	(Canada) K Cross (United States) A Rogers	3	6	[6]

Quarterfinals
1	(Japan) M Kobori (Thailand) P Plipuech	2	6	[7]
(United States) R Brantmeier (United States) C Corley	6	4	[10]
4	(India) A Raina (India) P Thombare	5	6^{4}
I Shymanovich (United States) K Volynets	7	7^{7}
(Japan) H Kuwata (United States) C Ngounoue
(United States) M Lewis (Canada) K Sebov	w/o
(United States) S Broadus (United States) K Collins	6	6
(Thailand) M Sawangkaew (Hong Kong) C Wong	2	3

Semifinals
(United States) R Brantmeier (United States) C Corley	2	2
I Shymanovich (United States) K Volynets	6	6
(United States) M Lewis (Canada) K Sebov	1	2
(United States) S Broadus (United States) K Collins	6	6

Final
I Shymanovich (United States) K Volynets	6	7^{8}
(United States) S Broadus (United States) K Collins	2	6^{6}
