= 2024 Wimbledon Championships – Men's singles =

Tennis championship

Gentlemen's singles
- 2024 Wimbledon Championships

Final
- Champion: (Spain) Carlos Alcaraz
- Runner-up: (Serbia) Novak Djokovic
- Score: 6–2, 6–2, 7–6^{(7–4)}

Details
- Draw: 128 (16 Q / 8 WC)
- Seeds: 32

Events
Singles	men	women		boys	girls
Doubles	men	women	mixed	boys	girls
WC Singles	men	women	quad
WC Doubles	men	women	quad
14&U Singles	boys	girls
Legends	men	women	mixed

Qualification
Singles	men	women
- Wimbledon Championships

Defending champion Carlos Alcaraz defeated Novak Djokovic in a rematch of the previous year's final, 6–2, 6–2, 7–6^{(7–4)} to win the gentlemen's singles tennis title at the 2024 Wimbledon Championships. It was his second Wimbledon title and fourth major title overall, becoming the sixth and youngest man in the Open Era to complete the Channel Slam at just 21 years, 70 days old. Alcaraz broke the previous record of 22 years, 32 days old, by Björn Borg, and Rafael Nadal was 1 day older at the age of 22 years, 33 days. Alcaraz was the second man in the Open Era, after Roger Federer, to win his first four major finals, and the first man outside of the Big Three to defend a major title since Gustavo Kuerten at the 2001 French Open. This marked Djokovic's record-extending 37th major final.

The tournament featured 37 five-set matches, the most at a major in the Open Era, breaking the previous record of 35 jointly held by the 1983 US Open and 2024 Australian Open.

Giovanni Mpetshi Perricard was the first lucky loser to reach the fourth round of a major since Stéphane Robert at the 2014 Australian Open, and the first to do so at Wimbledon since Dick Norman in 1995.

== Seeds ==
1. (Italy) Jannik Sinner (quarterfinals)
2. (Serbia) Novak Djokovic (final)
3. (Spain) Carlos Alcaraz (champion)
4. (Germany) Alexander Zverev (fourth round)
5. Daniil Medvedev (semifinals)
6. Andrey Rublev (first round)
7. (Poland) Hubert Hurkacz (second round, retired)
8. (Norway) Casper Ruud (second round)
9. (Australia) Alex de Minaur (quarterfinals, withdrew)
10. (Bulgaria) Grigor Dimitrov (fourth round, retired)
11. (Greece) Stefanos Tsitsipas (second round)
12. (United States) Tommy Paul (quarterfinals)
13. (United States) Taylor Fritz (quarterfinals)
14. (United States) Ben Shelton (fourth round)
15. (Denmark) Holger Rune (fourth round)
16. (France) Ugo Humbert (fourth round)
17. (Canada) Félix Auger-Aliassime (first round)
18. (Argentina) Sebastián Báez (first round)
19. (Chile) Nicolás Jarry (first round)
20. (United States) Sebastian Korda (first round)
21. Karen Khachanov (second round)
22. (France) Adrian Mannarino (first round)
23. (Kazakhstan) Alexander Bublik (third round)
24. (Chile) Alejandro Tabilo (third round)
25. (Italy) Lorenzo Musetti (semifinals)
26. (Argentina) Francisco Cerúndolo (first round)
27. (Netherlands) Tallon Griekspoor (second round)
28. (United Kingdom) Jack Draper (second round)
29. (United States) Frances Tiafoe (third round)
30. (Argentina) Tomás Martín Etcheverry (second round)
31. (Argentina) Mariano Navone (first round)
32. (China) Zhang Zhizhen (second round)

Click on the seed number of a player to go to their draw section.

== Draw ==
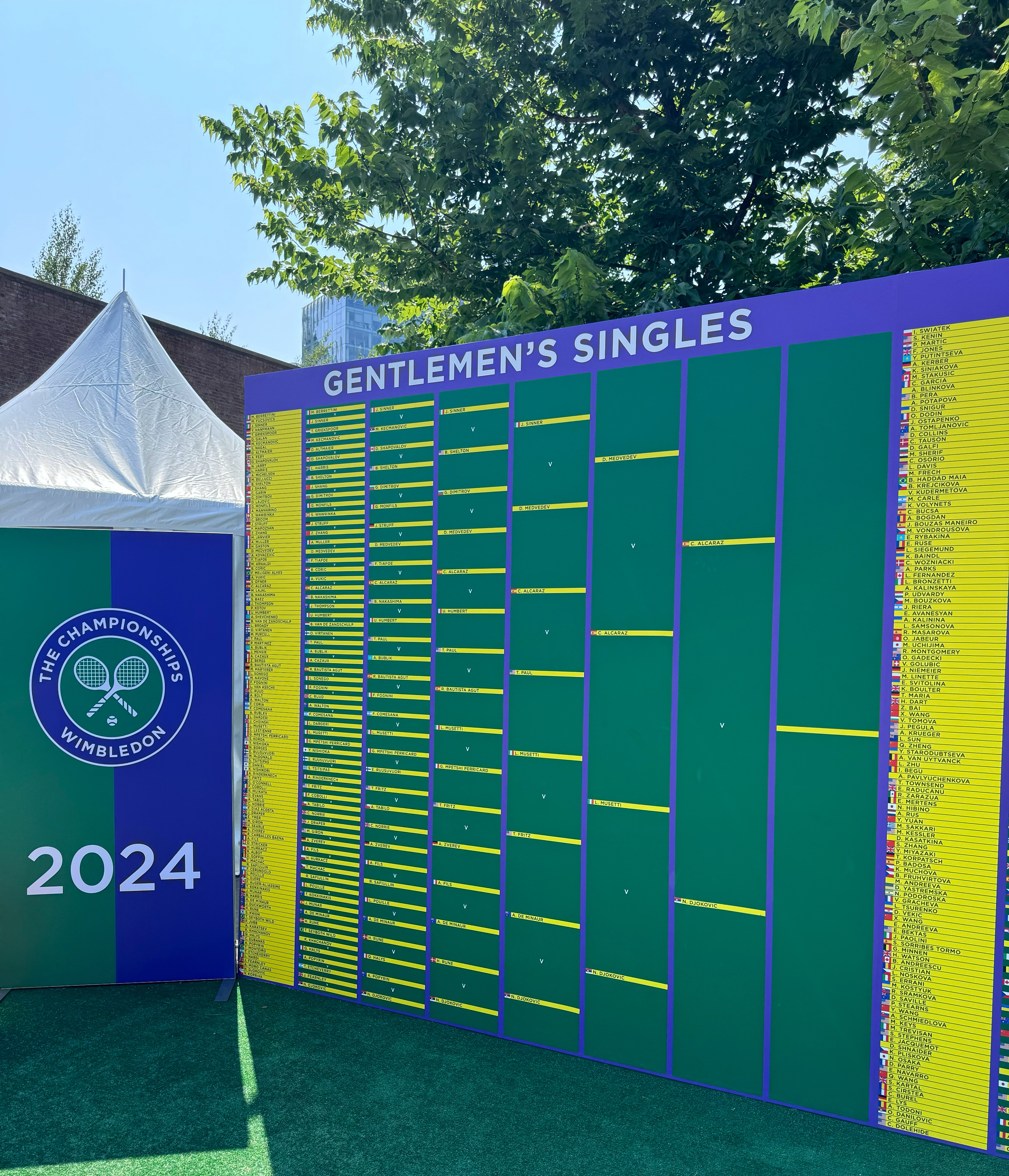
Wimbledon 2024 gentlemen’s singles draw

Key

- Q = Qualifier
- WC = Wild card
- LL = Lucky loser
- Alt = Alternate
- ITF = ITF entry
- PR = Protected ranking
- SR = Special ranking
- SE = Special exempt
- JE = Junior exempt
- JR = Junior Accelerator Programme entrant
- CO = College Accelerator Programme entrant
- NG = Next Gen Accelerator Program entrant
- w/o = Walkover
- r = Retired
- d = Defaulted

=== Finals ===
Quarter-finals
1	(Italy) Jannik Sinner	7^{9}	4	6^{4}	6	3
5	Daniil Medvedev	6^{7}	6	7^{7}	2	6
3	(Spain) Carlos Alcaraz	5	6	6	6
12	(United States) Tommy Paul	7	4	2	2
25	(Italy) Lorenzo Musetti	3	7^{7}	6	3	6
13	(United States) Taylor Fritz	6	6^{5}	2	6	1
9	(Australia) Alex de Minaur
2	(Serbia) Novak Djokovic	w/o

Semi-finals
5	Daniil Medvedev	7^{7}	3	4	4
3	(Spain) Carlos Alcaraz	6^{1}	6	6	6
25	(Italy) Lorenzo Musetti	4	6^{2}	4
2	(Serbia) Novak Djokovic	6	7^{7}	6

Final
3	(Spain) Carlos Alcaraz	6	6	7^{7}
2	(Serbia) Novak Djokovic	2	2	6^{4}

=== Top half ===
==== Section 1 ====
First round
1	(Italy) J Sinner	6	6	3	6
(Germany) Y Hanfmann	3	4	6	3
(Italy) M Berrettini	7^{7}	6	3	6
(Hungary) M Fucsovics	6^{3}	2	6	1
(India) S Nagal	2	6	3	4
(Serbia) M Kecmanović	6	3	6	6
LL	(Colombia) DE Galán	6^{3}	3	4
27	(Netherlands) T Griekspoor	7^{7}	6	6
19	(Chile) N Jarry	1	5	4
PR	(Canada) D Shapovalov	6	7	6
(Germany) D Altmaier	4	7^{8}	1	6	6
WC	(United Kingdom) A Fery	6	6^{6}	6	3	1
Q	(South Africa) L Harris	3	4	7^{7}	6	7^{11}
(United States) A Michelsen	6	6	6^{5}	2	6^{9}
Q	(Italy) M Bellucci	6	3	6	3	4
14	(United States) B Shelton	4	6	3	6	6

Second round
1	(Italy) J Sinner	7^{7}	7^{7}	2	7^{7}
(Italy) M Berrettini	6^{3}	6^{4}	6	6^{4}
(Serbia) M Kecmanović	4	7^{9}	1	6	6
27	(Netherlands) T Griekspoor	6	6^{7}	6	2	3
PR	(Canada) D Shapovalov	7^{7}	6	1	6^{3}	6
(Germany) D Altmaier	6^{3}	3	6	7^{7}	4
Q	(South Africa) L Harris	6	6^{5}	7^{7}	3	6^{7}
14	(United States) B Shelton	4	7^{7}	6^{5}	6	7^{10}

Third round
1	(Italy) J Sinner	6	6	6
(Serbia) M Kecmanović	1	4	2
PR	(Canada) D Shapovalov	7^{7}	2	4	6	2
14	(United States) B Shelton	6^{4}	6	6	4	6

Fourth round
1	(Italy) J Sinner	6	6	7^{11}
14	(United States) B Shelton	2	4	6^{9}

==== Section 2 ====
First round
10	(Bulgaria) G Dimitrov	6	6	7
(Serbia) D Lajović	3	4	5
Q	(Chile) C Garín	5	4	4
(China) J Shang	7	6	6
(Switzerland) S Wawrinka	6	7	6
WC	(United Kingdom) C Broom	3	5	4
(France) G Monfils	6	3	7	6
22	(France) A Mannarino	4	6	5	4
32	(China) Z Zhang	7^{7}	6	6
Q	(France) M Janvier	6^{4}	3	2
(Germany) J-L Struff	6	6^{4}	6	6
(Hungary) F Marozsán	4	7^{7}	2	3
(France) A Müller	6	7^{7}	7^{7}
Q	(France) H Gaston	4	6^{2}	6^{5}
(United States) A Kovacevic	3	4	2
5	D Medvedev	6	6	6

Second round
10	(Bulgaria) G Dimitrov	5	6^{4}	6	6	6
(China) J Shang	7	7^{7}	4	2	4
(Switzerland) S Wawrinka	6^{5}	4	6^{3}
(France) G Monfils	7^{7}	6	7^{7}
32	(China) Z Zhang	7	3	6^{1}	6^{8}
(Germany) J-L Struff	5	6	7^{7}	7^{10}
(France) A Müller	7^{7}	6^{4}	4	5
5	D Medvedev	6^{3}	7^{7}	6	7

Third round
10	(Bulgaria) G Dimitrov	6	6	6
(France) G Monfils	3	4	3
(Germany) J-L Struff	1	3	6	6^{3}
5	D Medvedev	6	6	4	7^{7}

Fourth round
10	(Bulgaria) G Dimitrov	3^{r}
5	D Medvedev	5

==== Section 3 ====
First round
3	(Spain) C Alcaraz	7^{7}	7	6
Q	(Estonia) M Lajal	6^{3}	5	2
(Australia) A Vukic	6^{9}	6	6	3	7^{10}
(Austria) S Ofner	7^{11}	4	4	6	6^{8}
(Croatia) B Ćorić	6	7^{7}	6
Q	(Brazil) F Meligeni Alves	3	6^{2}	3
(Italy) M Arnaldi	7^{7}	6	1	3	3
29	(United States) F Tiafoe	6^{5}	2	6	6	6
18	(Argentina) S Báez	2	3	4
(United States) B Nakashima	6	6	6
P Kotov	7	7	4	4	4
(Australia) J Thompson	5	5	6	6	6
(Netherlands) B van de Zandschulp	6	4	6	6
WC	(United Kingdom) L Broady	2	6	3	2
(Kazakhstan) A Shevchenko	1	6	6^{2}	7^{7}	1
16	(France) U Humbert	6	4	7^{7}	6^{3}	6

Second round
3	(Spain) C Alcaraz	7^{7}	6	6
(Australia) A Vukic	6^{5}	2	2
(Croatia) B Ćorić	6^{5}	1	3
29	(United States) F Tiafoe	7^{7}	6	6
(United States) B Nakashima	6	6	6
(Australia) J Thompson	3	2	2
(Netherlands) B van de Zandschulp	6^{9}	1	3
16	(France) U Humbert	7^{11}	6	6

Third round
3	(Spain) C Alcaraz	5	6	4	7^{7}	6
29	(United States) F Tiafoe	7	2	6	6^{2}	2
(United States) B Nakashima	6^{9}	3	7^{7}	6^{6}
16	(France) U Humbert	7^{11}	6	6^{5}	7^{8}

Fourth round
3	(Spain) C Alcaraz	6	6	1	7
16	(France) U Humbert	3	4	6	5

==== Section 4 ====
First round
12	(United States) T Paul	6	6	4	6
(Spain) P Martínez	2	1	6	3
Q	(Finland) O Virtanen	6	6	6
(Australia) M Purcell	3	2	2
Q	(Belgium) Z Bergs	1	4	7^{7}	7^{7}	6^{8}
(France) A Cazaux	6	6	6^{2}	6^{4}	7^{10}
(Czech Republic) J Menšík	6	7^{7}	4	4	2
23	(Kazakhstan) A Bublik	4	6^{2}	6	6	6
31	(Argentina) M Navone	4	6^{2}	4
(Italy) L Sonego	6	7^{7}	6
(Spain) R Bautista Agut	6	6	6
(Germany) M Marterer	3	1	4
LL	(France) L Van Assche	1	3	5
(Italy) F Fognini	6	6	7
Q	(Australia) A Bolt	6^{2}	4	4
8	(Norway) C Ruud	7^{7}	6	6

Second round
12	(United States) T Paul	4	6	5	7	6
Q	(Finland) O Virtanen	6	3	7	5	4
(France) A Cazaux	4	6^{1}	4
23	(Kazakhstan) A Bublik	6	7^{7}	6
(Italy) L Sonego	3	6	3	4
(Spain) R Bautista Agut	6	3	6	6
(Italy) F Fognini	6	7	6^{1}	6
8	(Norway) C Ruud	4	5	7^{7}	3

Third round
12	(United States) T Paul	6	6	6
23	(Kazakhstan) A Bublik	3	4	2
(Spain) R Bautista Agut	7^{8}	3	5	7^{7}	6
(Italy) F Fognini	6^{6}	6	7	6^{1}	4

Fourth round
12	(United States) T Paul	6	7^{7}	6
(Spain) R Bautista Agut	2	6^{3}	2

=== Bottom half ===
==== Section 5 ====
First round
6	A Rublev	4	7	2	6^{5}
(Argentina) F Comesaña	6	5	6	7^{7}
(Argentina) F Coria	3	3	5
(Australia) A Walton	6	6	7
(Italy) L Darderi	7	4	2	7	6
WC	(United Kingdom) J Choinski	5	6	6	5	2
(France) C Lestienne	6	6^{4}	2	2
25	(Italy) L Musetti	4	7^{7}	6	6
20	(United States) S Korda	6^{5}	7^{7}	6^{6}	7^{7}	3
LL	(France) G Mpetshi Perricard	7^{7}	6^{4}	7^{8}	6^{4}	6
(Japan) Y Nishioka	6	7^{8}	2	6
(Portugal) N Borges	2	6^{6}	6	3
(Finland) E Ruusuvuori	7^{8}	4	5	7^{8}	6
(United States) M McDonald	6^{6}	6	7	6^{6}	3
(Japan) T Daniel	6^{5}	4	5
11	(Greece) S Tsitsipas	7^{7}	6	7

Second round
(Argentina) F Comesaña	7	1	6^{12}	6	7^{10}
(Australia) A Walton	5	6	7^{14}	1	6^{8}
(Italy) L Darderi	4	6	7^{7}	4	4
25	(Italy) L Musetti	6	4	6^{5}	6	6
LL	(France) G Mpetshi Perricard	6	6	6
(Japan) Y Nishioka	4	1	2
(Finland) E Ruusuvuori	7^{8}	7^{12}	3	6
11	(Greece) S Tsitsipas	6^{6}	6^{10}	6	3

Third round
(Argentina) F Comesaña	2	7^{7}	6^{3}	3
25	(Italy) L Musetti	6	6^{4}	7^{7}	6
LL	(France) G Mpetshi Perricard	4	6	7^{7}	6
(Finland) E Ruusuvuori	6	2	6^{5}	4

Fourth round
25	(Italy) L Musetti	4	6	6	6
LL	(France) G Mpetshi Perricard	6	3	3	2

==== Section 6 ====
First round
13	(United States) T Fritz	6	6	6
(Australia) C O'Connell	1	2	4
PR	(Japan) K Nishikori	7	4	7^{7}	3	2
(France) A Rinderknech	5	6	6^{2}	6	6
(Italy) F Cobolli	7	4	6	6
(Australia) R Hijikata	5	6	4	4
(United Kingdom) D Evans	2	5	3
24	(Chile) A Tabilo	6	7	6
28	(United Kingdom) J Draper	3	6	6	4	6
Q	(Sweden) E Ymer	6	3	3	6	3
(United Kingdom) C Norrie	7	7	6
(Argentina) F Díaz Acosta	5	5	3
WC	(United Kingdom) H Searle	6	3	4	4
(United States) M Giron	3	6	6	6
(Spain) R Carballés Baena	2	4	2
4	(Germany) A Zverev	6	6	6

Second round
13	(United States) T Fritz	6	6	3	6
(France) A Rinderknech	3	4	6	4
(Italy) F Cobolli	6^{4}	6^{4}	6	6	4
24	(Chile) A Tabilo	7^{7}	7^{7}	4	4	6
28	(United Kingdom) J Draper	6^{3}	4	6^{6}
(United Kingdom) C Norrie	7^{7}	6	7^{8}
(United States) M Giron	2	1	4
4	(Germany) A Zverev	6	6	6

Third round
13	(United States) T Fritz	7^{7}	6	7
24	(Chile) A Tabilo	6^{3}	3	5
(United Kingdom) C Norrie	4	4	6^{15}
4	(Germany) A Zverev	6	6	7^{17}

Fourth round
13	(United States) T Fritz	4	6^{4}	6	7^{7}	6
4	(Germany) A Zverev	6	7^{7}	4	6^{3}	3

==== Section 7 ====
First round
7	(Poland) H Hurkacz	5	6	6	6
Q	(Moldova) R Albot	7	4	3	4
(France) A Fils	6	6	3	6
PR	(Switzerland) D Stricker	3	2	6	4
LL	(Belgium) D Goffin	6	6	4	1	6^{5}
(Czech Republic) T Macháč	3	3	6	6	7^{10}
R Safiullin	6^{5}	3	7	6	6
26	(Argentina) F Cerúndolo	7^{7}	6	5	3	4
17	(Canada) F Auger-Aliassime	6	7	6^{9}	4	4
(Australia) T Kokkinakis	4	5	7^{11}	6	6
Q	(France) L Pouille	3	7^{7}	3	6	6
(Serbia) L Djere	6	6^{4}	6	3	1
(Spain) J Munar	6	6	3	6
WC	(United Kingdom) B Harris	4	4	6	3
LL	(Australia) J Duckworth	6^{1}	6^{3}	6^{4}
9	(Australia) A de Minaur	7^{7}	7^{7}	7^{7}

Second round
7	(Poland) H Hurkacz	6^{2}	4	6	6^{r}
(France) A Fils	7^{7}	6	2	6
(Czech Republic) T Macháč	2	4	7	3
R Safiullin	6	6	5	6
(Australia) T Kokkinakis	6	5	2^{r}
Q	(France) L Pouille	2	7	5
(Spain) J Munar	2	2	5
9	(Australia) A de Minaur	6	6	7

Third round
(France) A Fils	4	6	1	6	6
R Safiullin	6	3	6	4	3
Q	(France) L Pouille
9	(Australia) A de Minaur	w/o

Fourth round
(France) A Fils	2	4	6	3
9	(Australia) A de Minaur	6	6	4	6

==== Section 8 ====
First round
15	(Denmark) H Rune	6	6	6
PR	(South Korea) S-w Kwon	1	4	4
WC	(United Kingdom) P Jubb	6	6	6^{6}	4	5
(Brazil) T Seyboth Wild	1	3	7^{8}	6	7
Q	(France) Q Halys	6	6	6
(United States) C Eubanks	4	4	2
A Karatsev	3	7^{7}	6^{11}	0^{r}
21	K Khachanov	6	6^{4}	7^{13}	2
30	(Argentina) TM Etcheverry	6	6	6
(Italy) L Nardi	1	4	2
(Australia) A Popyrin	6	6^{8}	6	6
(Brazil) T Monteiro	4	7^{10}	3	4
WC	(United Kingdom) J Fearnley	7	6	7^{14}
Q	(Spain) A Moro Cañas	5	4	6^{12}
Q	(Czech Republic) V Kopřiva	1	2	2
2	(Serbia) N Djokovic	6	6	6

Second round
15	(Denmark) H Rune	3	6	6	6
(Brazil) T Seyboth Wild	6	3	2	2
Q	(France) Q Halys	4	6	3	6	6
21	K Khachanov	6	3	6	3	4
30	(Argentina) TM Etcheverry	6	4	6	4	3
(Australia) A Popyrin	3	6	4	6	6
WC	(United Kingdom) J Fearnley	3	4	7	5
2	(Serbia) N Djokovic	6	6	5	7

Third round
15	(Denmark) H Rune	1	6^{4}	6	7^{7}	6
Q	(France) Q Halys	6	7^{7}	4	6^{4}	1
(Australia) A Popyrin	6	3	4	6^{3}
2	(Serbia) N Djokovic	4	6	6	7^{7}

Fourth round
15	(Denmark) H Rune	3	4	2
2	(Serbia) N Djokovic	6	6	6

== Final match statistics ==
Category	Alcaraz	Djokovic
Aces	5	8
Double faults	6	4
1st serve % in	56–95	71–101
Winning % on 1st Serve	47–56	47–71
Winning % on 2nd Serve	20–39	12–30
Net points won	16–22	27–53
Break points won	5–14	1–3
Receiving points won	42–101	28–95
Winners	42	26
Unforced errors	24	25
Winners-UFE	+18	+1
Total points won	109	87
Total games won	19	10

== Seeded players ==
The following are the seeded players. Seedings are based on ATP rankings as of 24 June 2024. Rankings and points before are as of 1 July 2024.

Seed	Rank	Player	Points before	Points defending	Points earned	Points after	Status
1	1	(Italy) Jannik Sinner	9,890	720	400	9,570	Quarterfinals lost to Daniil Medvedev [5]
2	2	(Serbia) Novak Djokovic	8,360	1,200	1,300	8,460	Runner-up, lost to (Spain) Carlos Alcaraz [3]
3	3	(Spain) Carlos Alcaraz	8,130	2,000	2,000	8,130	Champion, defeated (Serbia) Novak Djokovic [2]
4	4	(Germany) Alexander Zverev	6,905	90	200	7,015	Fourth round lost to (United States) Taylor Fritz [13]
5	5	Daniil Medvedev	6,445	720	800	6,525	Semifinals lost to (Spain) Carlos Alcaraz [3]
6	6	Andrey Rublev	4,420	360	10	4,070	First round lost to (Argentina) Francisco Comesaña
7	7	(Poland) Hubert Hurkacz	4,235	180	50	4,105	Second round retired against (France) Arthur Fils
8	8	(Norway) Casper Ruud	4,025	45	50	4,030	Second round lost to (Italy) Fabio Fognini
9	9	(Australia) Alex de Minaur	3,830	45	400	4,185	Quarterfinals withdrew due to hip injury
10	10	(Bulgaria) Grigor Dimitrov	3,750	180	200	3,770	Fourth round retired against Daniil Medvedev [5]
11	11	(Greece) Stefanos Tsitsipas	3,745	180	50	3,615	Second round lost to (Finland) Emil Ruusuvuori
12	13	(United States) Tommy Paul	3,100	90	400	3,410	Quarterfinals lost to (Spain) Carlos Alcaraz [3]
13	12	(United States) Taylor Fritz	3,350	45	400	3,705	Quarterfinals lost to (Italy) Lorenzo Musetti [25]
14	14	(United States) Ben Shelton	2,595	45	200	2,750	Fourth round lost to (Italy) Jannik Sinner [1]
15	15	(Denmark) Holger Rune	2,370	360	200	2,210	Fourth round lost to (Serbia) Novak Djokovic [2]
16	16	(France) Ugo Humbert	2,300	10	200	2,490	Fourth round lost to (Spain) Carlos Alcaraz [3]
17	17	(Canada) Félix Auger-Aliassime	2,075	10	10	2,075	First round lost to (Australia) Thanasi Kokkinakis
18	18	(Argentina) Sebastián Báez	2,020	10	10	2,020	First round lost to (United States) Brandon Nakashima
19	20	(Chile) Nicolás Jarry	1,825	90	10	1,745	First round lost to (Canada) Denis Shapovalov [PR]
20	21	(United States) Sebastian Korda	1,795	10	10	1,795	First round lost to (France) Giovanni Mpetshi Perricard [LL]
21	22	Karen Khachanov	1,780	0	50	1,830	Second round lost to (France) Quentin Halys [Q]
22	24	(France) Adrian Mannarino	1,625	45	10	1,590	First round lost to (France) Gaël Monfils
23	23	(Kazakhstan) Alexander Bublik	1,730	180	100	1,650	Third round lost to (United States) Tommy Paul [12]
24	19	(Chile) Alejandro Tabilo	1,904	(75+36)^{†}	100+25	1,918	Third round lost to (United States) Taylor Fritz [13]
25	25	(Italy) Lorenzo Musetti	1,620	90	800	2,330	Semifinals lost to (Serbia) Novak Djokovic [2]
26	30	(Argentina) Francisco Cerúndolo	1,315	45	10	1,280	First round lost to Roman Safiullin
27	27	(Netherlands) Tallon Griekspoor	1,470	10	50	1,510	Second round lost to (Serbia) Miomir Kecmanović
28	28	(United Kingdom) Jack Draper	1,461	0	50	1,511	Second round lost to (United Kingdom) Cameron Norrie
29	29	(United States) Frances Tiafoe	1,355	90	100	1,365	Third round lost to (Spain) Carlos Alcaraz [3]
30	31	(Argentina) Tomás Martín Etcheverry	1,290	45	50	1,295	Second round lost to (Australia) Alexei Popyrin
31	32	(Argentina) Mariano Navone	1,282	(50)^{†}	10	1,242	First round lost to (Italy) Lorenzo Sonego
32	38	(China) Zhang Zhizhen	1,221	10	50	1,261	Second round lost to (Germany) Jan-Lennard Struff

† The player did not qualify for the main draw in 2023. He is defending points from one or more ATP Challenger Tour events instead.

=== Withdrawn players ===
The following players would have been seeded, but withdrew before the tournament began.

Rank	Player	Points before	Points dropped	Points after	Withdrawal reason
26	(Czech Republic) Jiří Lehečka	1,585	180	1,405	Lower back injury

== Other entry information ==
=== Wildcards ===
- (United Kingdom) Liam Broady
- (United Kingdom) Charles Broom
- (United Kingdom) Jan Choinski
- (United Kingdom) Jacob Fearnley
- (United Kingdom) Arthur Fery
- (United Kingdom) Billy Harris
- (United Kingdom) Paul Jubb
- (United Kingdom) Henry Searle

=== Protected ranking ===
- ~~(Spain) Pablo Carreño Busta (18)~~
- (Canada) Denis Shapovalov (27)
- (Japan) Kei Nishikori (48)
- (South Korea) Kwon Soon-woo (80)
- (Switzerland) Dominic Stricker (94)

=== Qualifiers ===
- (Moldova) Radu Albot
- (Italy) Mattia Bellucci
- (Belgium) Zizou Bergs
- (Australia) Alex Bolt
- (Chile) Cristian Garín
- (France) Hugo Gaston
- (France) Quentin Halys
- (South Africa) Lloyd Harris
- (France) Maxime Janvier
- (Czech Republic) Vít Kopřiva
- (Estonia) Mark Lajal
- (Brazil) Felipe Meligeni Alves
- (Spain) Alejandro Moro Cañas
- (France) Lucas Pouille
- (Finland) Otto Virtanen
- (Sweden) Elias Ymer

=== Lucky losers ===
- (Australia) James Duckworth
- (Colombia) Daniel Elahi Galán
- (Belgium) David Goffin
- (France) Giovanni Mpetshi Perricard
- (France) Luca Van Assche

=== Withdrawals ===
The entry list was released based on the ATP rankings for the week of 20 May 2024.

- ‡ (Spain) Rafael Nadal (9 PR) → replaced by (Germany) Maximilian Marterer (99)
- ‡ (Czech Republic) Jiří Lehečka (24) → replaced by (Netherlands) Botic van de Zandschulp (100)
- § (France) Corentin Moutet (79) → replaced by (Australia) James Duckworth (LL)
- § (Germany) Dominik Koepfer (67) → replaced by (France) Luca Van Assche (LL)
- § (Spain) Alejandro Davidovich Fokina (34) → replaced by (France) Giovanni Mpetshi Perricard (LL)
- § (Spain) Pablo Carreño Busta (18 PR) → replaced by (Colombia) Daniel Elahi Galán (LL)
- § (United Kingdom) Andy Murray (75) → replaced by (Belgium) David Goffin (LL)

‡ – withdrew from entry list
§ – withdrew from main draw

Preceded by 2024 French Open – Men's singles	Grand Slam men's singles	Succeeded by 2024 US Open – Men's singles
