= 2024 Open d'Orléans – Doubles =

Tennis tournament in France

Doubles
- 2024 Open d'Orléans

Final
- Champions: (France) Benjamin Bonzi (France) Sascha Gueymard Wayenburg
- Runners-up: (France) Manuel Guinard (France) Grégoire Jacq
- Score: 7–6^{(9–7)}, 4–6, [10–5]

Events
Singles	Doubles
- Open d'Orléans

Constantin Frantzen and Hendrik Jebens were the defending champions but chose not to defend their title.

Benjamin Bonzi and Sascha Gueymard Wayenburg won the title after defeating Manuel Guinard and Grégoire Jacq 7–6^{(9–7)}, 4–6, [10–5] in the final.

== Seeds ==
1. (Sweden) André Göransson / (Netherlands) Sem Verbeek (first round)
2. (Netherlands) Robin Haase / (Austria) Lucas Miedler (quarterfinals)
3. (Netherlands) Sander Arends / (United Kingdom) Luke Johnson (quarterfinals)
4. (France) Manuel Guinard / (France) Grégoire Jacq (final)

== Draw ==
Key

- Q = Qualifier
- WC = Wild card
- LL = Lucky loser
- Alt = Alternate
- ITF = ITF entry
- PR = Protected ranking
- SR = Special ranking
- SE = Special exempt
- JE = Junior exempt
- JR = Junior Accelerator Programme entrant
- CO = College Accelerator Programme entrant
- NG = Next Gen Accelerator Program entrant
- w/o = Walkover
- r = Retired
- d = Defaulted

=== Draw ===
First round
1	(Sweden) A Göransson (Netherlands) S Verbeek	3	2
(Germany) J Schnaitter (Germany) M Wallner	6	6
(Bulgaria) A Genov (Italy) Samuel Vincent Ruggeri	6	2	[10]
(France) A Escoffier (France) C Hemery	3	6	[7]
3	(Netherlands) S Arends (United Kingdom) L Johnson	6	6
(Austria) D Pichler (Austria) J Rodionov	3	3
(France) J Eysseric (France) H Mayot	6	6^{10}	[7]
(France) B Bonzi (France) S Gueymard Wayenburg	4	7^{12}	[10]
WC	(France) T Lamasine (France) T Paris	6	1	[10]
(France) M Janvier; A Vatutin	1	6	[8]
WC	(France) R Bertrand (France) A Bouquier	5	4
4	(France) M Guinard (France) G Jacq	7	6
(United Kingdom) C Broom (United Kingdom) M Willis	5	6	[6]
(France) H Grenier (France) L Sanchez	7	3	[10]
(India) A Chandrasekar (India) N Kaliyanda Poonacha	2	4
2	(Netherlands) R Haase (Austria) L Miedler	6	6

Quarterfinals
(Germany) J Schnaitter (Germany) M Wallner	7	6
(Bulgaria) A Genov (Italy) S Vincent Ruggeri	5	3
3	(Netherlands) S Arends (United Kingdom) L Johnson	4	6	[5]
(France) B Bonzi (France) S Gueymard Wayenburg	6	3	[10]
WC	(France) T Lamasine (France) T Paris	6	1	[3]
4	(France) M Guinard (France) G Jacq	3	6	[10]
(France) H Grenier (France) L Sanchez	6	4	[10]
2	(Netherlands) R Haase (Austria) L Miedler	3	6	[2]

Semifinals
(Germany) J Schnaitter (Germany) M Wallner	3	5
(France) B Bonzi (France) S Gueymard Wayenburg	6	7
4	(France) M Guinard (France) G Jacq	7^{7}	6
(France) H Grenier (France) L Sanchez	6^{3}	2

Final
(France) B Bonzi (France) S Gueymard Wayenburg	7^{9}	4	[10]
4	(France) M Guinard (France) G Jacq	6^{7}	6	[5]
