= 2025 Mutua Madrid Open – Men's singles =

Men's singles
- 2025 Mutua Madrid Open

Final
- Champion: (Norway) Casper Ruud
- Runner-up: (United Kingdom) Jack Draper
- Score: 7–5, 3–6, 6–4

Details
- Draw: 96 (12Q, 5WC)
- Seeds: 32

Events
Singles	men	women
Doubles	men	women
- Madrid Open

Casper Ruud defeated Jack Draper in the final, 7–5, 3–6, 6–4 to win the men's singles tennis title at the 2025 Madrid Open. By winning his first ATP 1000 title, he became the first Norwegian champion in ATP 1000 history (since 1990). Aged 23 years and 121 days old, Draper was the youngest British man in the Open Era to reach ATP Tour finals on clay, grass and hardcourt.

Andrey Rublev was the defending champion, but lost in the third round to Alexander Bublik. Aged 38 years and 7 months old, Gaël Monfils became the oldest man to win a singles main draw match in tournament history.

== Seeds ==
All seeds received a bye into the second round.

1. (Germany) Alexander Zverev (fourth round)
2. (Spain) Carlos Alcaraz (withdrew)
3. (United States) Taylor Fritz (fourth round)
4. (Serbia) Novak Djokovic (second round)
5. (United Kingdom) Jack Draper (final)
6. (Australia) Alex de Minaur (fourth round)
7. Andrey Rublev (third round)
8. (Denmark) Holger Rune (second round, retired)
9. Daniil Medvedev (quarterfinals)
10. (Italy) Lorenzo Musetti (semifinals)
11. (United States) Tommy Paul (fourth round)
12. (United States) Ben Shelton (third round)
13. (France) Arthur Fils (second round)
14. (Norway) Casper Ruud (champion)
15. (Bulgaria) Grigor Dimitrov (fourth round)
16. (United States) Frances Tiafoe (fourth round)
17. (Greece) Stefanos Tsitsipas (third round)
18. (Canada) Félix Auger-Aliassime (second round)
19. (Czech Republic) Tomáš Macháč (second round)
20. (Argentina) Francisco Cerúndolo (semifinals)
21. (France) Ugo Humbert (second round)
22. (Czech Republic) Jakub Menšík (quarterfinals)
23. (United States) Sebastian Korda (third round)
24. Karen Khachanov (third round)
25. (Australia) Alexei Popyrin (second round)
26. (Czech Republic) Jiří Lehečka (second round)
27. (Poland) Hubert Hurkacz (second round)
28. (Spain) Alejandro Davidovich Fokina (third round)
29. (Canada) Denis Shapovalov (third round)
30. (Italy) Matteo Berrettini (third round, retired)
31. (United States) Brandon Nakashima (fourth round)
32. (Argentina) Sebastián Báez (second round)

Click on the seed number of a player to go to their draw section.

== Draw ==
Key

- Q = Qualifier
- WC = Wild card
- LL = Lucky loser
- Alt = Alternate
- ITF = ITF entry
- PR = Protected ranking
- SR = Special ranking
- SE = Special exempt
- JE = Junior exempt
- JR = Junior Accelerator Programme entrant
- CO = College Accelerator Programme entrant
- NG = Next Gen Accelerator Program entrant
- w/o = Walkover
- r = Retired
- d = Defaulted

=== Finals ===
Quarterfinals
20	(Argentina) Francisco Cerúndolo	3	7^{7}	6
22	(Czech Republic) Jakub Menšík	6	6^{5}	2
14	(Norway) Casper Ruud	6	7
9	Daniil Medvedev	3	5
5	(United Kingdom) Jack Draper	6	6
(Italy) Matteo Arnaldi	0	4
10	(Italy) Lorenzo Musetti	6	6
LL	(Canada) Gabriel Diallo	4	3

Semifinals
20	(Argentina) Francisco Cerúndolo	4	5
14	(Norway) Casper Ruud	6	7
5	(United Kingdom) Jack Draper	6	7^{7}
10	(Italy) Lorenzo Musetti	3	6^{4}

Final
14	(Norway) Casper Ruud	7	3	6
5	(United Kingdom) Jack Draper	5	6	4

=== Top half ===
==== Section 1 ====
First round
(Spain) R Bautista Agut	6	2	6
(Spain) J Munar	4	6	3
(Portugal) N Borges	6^{7}	7^{7}	6
WC	(Spain) P Carreño Busta	7^{9}	6^{3}	3
(France) C Moutet	3	2^{r}
Q	(France) H Mayot	6	4
(Argentina) F Comesaña	6	6
(Spain) P Martínez	4	4

Second round
1	(Germany) A Zverev	6	6
(Spain) R Bautista Agut	2	2
(Portugal) N Borges	2	3
28	(Spain) A Davidovich Fokina	6	6
20	(Argentina) F Cerúndolo	6	6
Q	(France) H Mayot	3	4
(Argentina) F Comesaña	7^{7}	6
13	(France) A Fils	6^{4}	4

Third round
1	(Germany) A Zverev	2	7^{7}	7^{7}
28	(Spain) A Davidovich Fokina	6	6^{3}	6^{0}
20	(Argentina) F Cerúndolo	6	6
(Argentina) F Comesaña	4	4

Fourth round
1	(Germany) A Zverev	5	3
20	(Argentina) F Cerúndolo	7	6

==== Section 2 ====
First round
(France) G Mpetshi Perricard	4	4
(Argentina) M Navone	6	6
Q	(Serbia) D Lajović	3	4
Q	(United States) E Quinn	6	6
(United States) A Michelsen	6^{2}	6^{4}
(Kazakhstan) A Bublik	7^{7}	7^{7}
(France) G Monfils	1	6	6
Q	(Croatia) B Gojo	6	2	4

Second round
12	(United States) B Shelton	4	7^{7}	6
(Argentina) M Navone	6	6^{5}	3
Q	(United States) E Quinn	6^{4}	1
22	(Czech Republic) J Menšík	7^{7}	6
25	(Australia) A Popyrin	4	6^{4}
(Kazakhstan) A Bublik	6	7^{7}
(France) G Monfils
7	A Rublev	w/o

Third round
12	(United States) B Shelton	1	4
22	(Czech Republic) J Menšík	6	6
(Kazakhstan) A Bublik	6	0	6
7	A Rublev	4	6	4

Fourth round
22	(Czech Republic) J Menšík	6	6
(Kazakhstan) A Bublik	3	2

==== Section 3 ====
First round
(Australia) C O'Connell	6	6
(Argentina) C Ugo Carabelli	3	4
(France) B Bonzi	6	6
WC	(Croatia) M Čilić	3	2
WC	(Italy) F Cinà	7^{7}	6
WC	(Hong Kong) C Wong	6^{5}	1
R Safiullin	6^{4}	1
(France) A Rinderknech	7^{7}	6

Second round
3	(United States) T Fritz	6	6
(Australia) C O'Connell	1	4
(France) B Bonzi	6	7
27	(Poland) H Hurkacz	4	5
23	(United States) S Korda	6	3	6
WC	(Italy) F Cinà	3	6	1
(France) A Rinderknech	3	4
14	(Norway) C Ruud	6	6

Third round
3	(United States) T Fritz	4	7	0
(France) B Bonzi	6	5	0^{r}
23	(United States) S Korda	3	3
14	(Norway) C Ruud	6	6

Fourth round
3	(United States) T Fritz	5	4
14	(Norway) C Ruud	7	6

==== Section 4 ====
First round
Q	(Italy) F Fognini	2	3
(Serbia) L Djere	6	6
Q	(Argentina) JM Cerúndolo	3	7	6
(United States) A Kovacevic	6	5	2
PR	(Austria) S Ofner	6	6
Q	(France) H Gaston	4	3
(Hungary) F Marozsán	6^{4}	5
(Italy) F Cobolli	7^{7}	7

Second round
9	D Medvedev	w/o
(Serbia) L Djere
Q	(Argentina) JM Cerúndolo	7^{7}	6
18	(Canada) F Auger-Aliassime	6^{5}	4
31	(United States) B Nakashima	6	7^{7}
PR	(Austria) S Ofner	3	6^{3}
(Italy) F Cobolli	6	0
8	(Denmark) H Rune	2	0^{r}

Third round
9	D Medvedev	6	6
Q	(Argentina) JM Cerúndolo	2	2
31	(United States) B Nakashima	7	6
(Italy) F Cobolli	5	3

Fourth round
9	D Medvedev	3	6	6
31	(United States) B Nakashima	6	1	4

=== Bottom half ===
==== Section 5 ====
First round
(Netherlands) T Griekspoor	6	6
Q	(Czech Republic) V Kopřiva	1	4
(United States) L Tien	1	6	6^{4}
(United States) M Giron	6	1	7^{7}
PR	(United States) R Opelka	7	7
LL	(Australia) R Hijikata	5	5
(Brazil) J Fonseca	6	6
Q	(Denmark) E Møller	2	3

Second round
5	(United Kingdom) J Draper	6	6
(Netherlands) T Griekspoor	3	4
(United States) M Giron	7^{7}	6^{6}	1
30	(Italy) M Berrettini	6^{3}	7^{8}	6
24	K Khachanov	7^{7}	7^{7}
PR	(United States) R Opelka	6^{3}	6^{4}
(Brazil) J Fonseca	6^{7}	6^{3}
11	(United States) T Paul	7^{9}	7^{7}

Third round
5	(United Kingdom) J Draper	7^{7}	0
30	(Italy) M Berrettini	6^{2}	0^{r}
24	K Khachanov	3	6	2
11	(United States) T Paul	6	3	6

Fourth round
5	(United Kingdom) J Draper	6	6
11	(United States) T Paul	2	2

==== Section 6 ====
First round
(France) Q Halys	4	4
(Italy) L Darderi	6	6
(Belgium) D Goffin	3	6	0^{r}
(France) A Müller	6	3	1
(Bosnia and Herzegovina) D Džumhur	4	6	6
(Italy) M Bellucci	6	4	2
(Italy) M Arnaldi	4	6	7
Q	(Croatia) B Ćorić	6	4	5

Second round
16	(United States) F Tiafoe	7	3
(Italy) L Darderi	5	1^{r}
(France) A Müller	6	6^{3}	7^{7}
21	(France) U Humbert	2	7^{7}	6^{5}
32	(Argentina) S Báez	6	1	2
(Bosnia and Herzegovina) D Džumhur	1	6	6
(Italy) M Arnaldi	6	6
4	(Serbia) N Djokovic	3	4

Third round
16	(United States) F Tiafoe	6	6
(France) A Müller	3	3
(Bosnia and Herzegovina) D Džumhur	3	4
(Italy) M Arnaldi	6	6

Fourth round
16	(United States) F Tiafoe	3	5
(Italy) M Arnaldi	6	7

==== Section 7 ====
First round
(Italy) L Sonego	6	7^{7}
(Serbia) M Kecmanović	4	6^{5}
(Australia) A Vukic	4	6	3
(Japan) K Nishikori	6	3	6
LL	(Netherlands) B van de Zandschulp	5	6	1^{r}
(Germany) J-L Struff	7	2	4
(Argentina) TM Etcheverry	6	6^{4}	6
(Serbia) H Medjedovic	4	7^{7}	4

Second round
6	(Australia) A de Minaur	6	6
(Italy) L Sonego	2	3
(Japan) K Nishikori	1	4
29	(Canada) D Shapovalov	6	6
17	(Greece) S Tsitsipas	3	6	6
(Germany) J-L Struff	6	4	3
(Argentina) TM Etcheverry	6^{3}	2
10	(Italy) L Musetti	7^{7}	6

Third round
6	(Australia) A de Minaur	6	7^{7}
29	(Canada) D Shapovalov	3	6^{3}
17	(Greece) S Tsitsipas	5	6^{3}
10	(Italy) L Musetti	7	7^{7}

Fourth round
6	(Australia) A de Minaur	4	2
10	(Italy) L Musetti	6	6

==== Section 8 ====
First round
Q	(Germany) D Altmaier	3	2
(Chile) N Jarry	6	6
(China) Y Bu	3	6^{2}
Q	(United Kingdom) J Fearnley	6	7^{7}
WC	(Spain) M Landaluce	7^{7}	5	4
(United Kingdom) C Norrie	6^{4}	7	6
(Belgium) Z Bergs	1	2
LL	(Canada) G Diallo	6	6

Second round
15	(Bulgaria) G Dimitrov	6	6
(Chile) N Jarry	3	4
Q	(United Kingdom) J Fearnley	1	6	6
19	(Czech Republic) T Macháč	6	3	2
26	(Czech Republic) J Lehečka	6	4	0
(United Kingdom) C Norrie	2	6	6
LL	(Canada) G Diallo	7	4	6
LL	(Poland) K Majchrzak	5	6	4

Third round
15	(Bulgaria) G Dimitrov	6	7^{7}
Q	(United Kingdom) J Fearnley	4	6^{3}
(United Kingdom) C Norrie	6	4	4
LL	(Canada) G Diallo	2	6	6

Fourth round
15	(Bulgaria) G Dimitrov	7	6^{7}	4
LL	(Canada) G Diallo	5	7^{9}	6

== Seeded players ==
The following are the seeded players. Seedings are based on ATP rankings as of 21 April 2025. Rankings and points before are as of 21 April 2025.

Seed	Rank	Player	Points before	Points defending	Points earned	Points after	Status
1	2	(Germany) Alexander Zverev	8,085	100	100	8,085	Fourth round lost to (Argentina) Francisco Cerúndolo [20]
2	3	(Spain) Carlos Alcaraz	8,050	200	0	7,850	Withdrew due to adductor injury
3	4	(United States) Taylor Fritz	5,115	400	100	4,815	Fourth round lost to (Norway) Casper Ruud [14]
4	5	(Serbia) Novak Djokovic	4,120	0	10	4,130	Second round lost to (Italy) Matteo Arnaldi
5	6	(United Kingdom) Jack Draper	3,820	30	650	4,440	Runner-up, lost to (Norway) Casper Ruud [14]
6	7	(Australia) Alex de Minaur	3,585	(50)^{†}	100	3,635	Fourth round lost to (Italy) Lorenzo Musetti [10]
7	8	Andrey Rublev	3,530	1,000	50	2,580	Third round lost to (Kazakhstan) Alexander Bublik
8	9	(Denmark) Holger Rune	3,480	50	10	3,440	Second round retired against (Italy) Flavio Cobolli
9	10	Daniil Medvedev	3,290	200	200	3,290	Quarterfinals lost to (Norway) Casper Ruud [14]
10	11	(Italy) Lorenzo Musetti	3,200	10+90	400+50	3,550	Semifinals lost to (United Kingdom) Jack Draper [5]
11	12	(United States) Tommy Paul	3,160	50	100	3,210	Fourth round lost to (United Kingdom) Jack Draper [5]
12	13	(United States) Ben Shelton	3,020	50	50	3,020	Third round lost to (Czech Republic) Jakub Menšík [22]
13	14	(France) Arthur Fils	2,920	10	10	2,920	Second round lost to (Argentina) Francisco Comesaña
14	15	(Norway) Casper Ruud	2,815	100	1,000	3,715	Champion, defeated (United Kingdom) Jack Draper [5]
15	16	(Bulgaria) Grigor Dimitrov	2,595	10	100	2,685	Fourth round lost to (Canada) Gabriel Diallo [LL]
16	17	(United States) Frances Tiafoe	2,550	10	100	2,640	Fourth round lost to (Italy) Matteo Arnaldi
17	18	(Greece) Stefanos Tsitsipas	2,415	(45)^{†}	50	2,420	Third round lost to (Italy) Lorenzo Musetti [10]
18	19	(Canada) Félix Auger-Aliassime	2,375	650	10	1,735	Second round lost to (Argentina) Juan Manuel Cerúndolo [Q]
19	20	(Czech Republic) Tomáš Macháč	2,235	30	10	2,215	Second round lost to (United Kingdom) Jacob Fearnley [Q]
20	21	(Argentina) Francisco Cerúndolo	2,225	200	400	2,425	Semifinals lost to (Norway) Casper Ruud [14]
21	22	(France) Ugo Humbert	2,185	50	10	2,145	Second round lost to (France) Alexandre Müller
22	23	(Czech Republic) Jakub Menšík	2,032	50	200	2,182	Quarterfinals lost to (Argentina) Francisco Cerúndolo [20]
23	24	(United States) Sebastian Korda	2,020	50	50	2,020	Third round lost to (Norway) Casper Ruud [14]
24	25	Karen Khachanov	1,960	100	50	1,910	Third round lost to (United States) Tommy Paul [11]
25	26	(Australia) Alexei Popyrin	1,860	10	10	1,860	Second round lost to (Kazakhstan) Alexander Bublik
26	27	(Czech Republic) Jiří Lehečka	1,795	400	10	1,405	Second round lost to (United Kingdom) Cameron Norrie
27	28	(Poland) Hubert Hurkacz	1,755	100	10	1,665	Second round lost to (France) Benjamin Bonzi
28	29	(Spain) Alejandro Davidovich Fokina	1,745	50	50	1,745	Third round lost to (Germany) Alexander Zverev [1]
29	30	(Canada) Denis Shapovalov	1,726	50	50	1,726	Third round lost to (Australia) Alex de Minaur [7]
30	31	(Italy) Matteo Berrettini	1,620	0	50	1,670	Third round retired against (United Kingdom) Jack Draper [5]
31	32	(United States) Brandon Nakashima	1,605	30	100	1,675	Fourth round lost to Daniil Medvedev [9]
32	33	(Argentina) Sebastián Báez	1,580	50	10	1,540	Second round lost to (Bosnia and Herzegovina) Damir Džumhur

† The player's 2024 points were replaced by a better result for purposes of his ranking as of 21 April 2025. Points for his 19th best result will be deducted instead.

=== Withdrawn seeded players ===
The following player would have been seeded, but withdrew before the tournament began.

Rank	Player	Points before	Points dropping	Points after	Withdrawal reason
1	(Italy) Jannik Sinner	9,930	200	9,730	Suspension for doping violation

== Other entry information ==
=== Wildcards ===
- (Spain) Pablo Carreño Busta
- (Croatia) Marin Čilić
- (Italy) Federico Cinà
- (Spain) Martín Landaluce
- (Hong Kong) Coleman Wong

=== Protected ranking ===
- (Austria) Sebastian Ofner
- (United States) Reilly Opelka

=== Withdrawals ===
- § (Spain) Carlos Alcaraz → replaced by (Poland) Kamil Majchrzak (LL)
- § (Spain) Roberto Carballés Baena → replaced by (Australia) Rinky Hijikata (LL)
- ‡ (China) Shang Juncheng → replaced by (United States) Aleksandar Kovacevic
- § (Japan) Yoshihito Nishioka → replaced by (Canada) Gabriel Diallo (LL)
- ‡ (Italy) Jannik Sinner → replaced by (Australia) Christopher O'Connell
- ‡ (Chile) Alejandro Tabilo → replaced by (United Kingdom) Cameron Norrie
- § (Australia) Jordan Thompson → replaced by (Netherlands) Botic van de Zandschulp (LL)
- ‡ (China) Zhang Zhizhen → replaced by (Kazakhstan) Alexander Bublik

‡ – withdrew from entry list
§ – withdrew from main draw

== Qualifying ==
=== Seeds ===
1. (Germany) Daniel Altmaier (qualified)
2. (United Kingdom) Jacob Fearnley (qualified)
3. (Canada) Gabriel Diallo (qualifying competition, lucky loser)
4. (France) Hugo Gaston (qualified)
5. (Australia) Rinky Hijikata (qualifying competition, lucky loser)
6. (Netherlands) Botic van de Zandschulp (qualifying competition, lucky loser)
7. (Hungary) Márton Fucsovics (first round)
8. (Poland) Kamil Majchrzak (qualifying competition, lucky loser)
9. (Brazil) Thiago Monteiro (qualifying competition)
10. (Netherlands) Jesper de Jong (first round)
11. (Czech Republic) Vít Kopřiva (qualified)
12. (Serbia) Dušan Lajović (qualified)
13. (United States) Mackenzie McDonald (first round, retired)
14. (Bolivia) Hugo Dellien (qualifying competition)
15. (Italy) Luca Nardi (qualifying competition)
16. (Chinese Taipei) Tseng Chun-hsin (first round)
17. (Kazakhstan) Alexander Shevchenko (first round)
18. (United Kingdom) Billy Harris (first round)
19. (United States) Nishesh Basavareddy (first round)
20. (Croatia) Borna Ćorić (qualified)
21. (Brazil) Thiago Seyboth Wild (first round)
22. (Italy) Fabio Fognini (qualified)
23. (France) Valentin Royer (qualifying competition)
24. (Colombia) Daniel Elahi Galán (qualifying competition)

=== Qualifiers ===
1. (Germany) Daniel Altmaier
2. (United Kingdom) Jacob Fearnley
3. (Croatia) Borna Ćorić
4. (France) Hugo Gaston
5. (Italy) Fabio Fognini
6. (Argentina) Juan Manuel Cerúndolo
7. (Croatia) Borna Gojo
8. (Denmark) Elmer Møller
9. (United States) Ethan Quinn
10. (France) Harold Mayot
11. (Czech Republic) Vít Kopřiva
12. (Serbia) Dušan Lajović

=== Lucky losers ===
1. (Australia) Rinky Hijikata
2. (Netherlands) Botic van de Zandschulp
3. (Canada) Gabriel Diallo
4. (Poland) Kamil Majchrzak

=== Qualifying draw ===
==== First qualifier ====
First round
1	(Germany) Daniel Altmaier	7^{12}	6
WC	(France) Luca Van Assche	6^{10}	4
WC	(Germany) Diego Dedura-Palomero	7^{9}	4	1
24	(Colombia) Daniel Elahi Galán	6^{7}	6	6

Qualifying competition
1	(Germany) Daniel Altmaier	7^{7}	3	6
24	(Colombia) Daniel Elahi Galán	6^{3}	6	1

==== Second qualifier ====
First round
2	(United Kingdom) Jacob Fearnley	4	6	6
Pavel Kotov	6	4	1
(France) Adrian Mannarino	3	6^{8}
14	(Bolivia) Hugo Dellien	6	7^{10}

Qualifying competition
2	(United Kingdom) Jacob Fearnley	7	6
14	(Bolivia) Hugo Dellien	5	1

==== Third qualifier ====
First round
3	(Canada) Gabriel Diallo	6	6
(United States) Nicolas Moreno de Alboran	3	3
(Finland) Otto Virtanen	7^{7}	5	2
20	(Croatia) Borna Ćorić	6^{1}	7	6

Qualifying competition
3	(Canada) Gabriel Diallo	3	6^{6}
20	(Croatia) Borna Ćorić	6	7^{8}

==== Fourth qualifier ====
First round
4	(France) Hugo Gaston	7^{8}	4	6
(Germany) Yannick Hanfmann	6^{6}	6	4
WC	(India) Manas Dhamne	4	4
15	(Italy) Luca Nardi	6	6

Qualifying competition
4	(France) Hugo Gaston	6	6
15	(Italy) Luca Nardi	4	2

==== Fifth qualifier ====
First round
5	(Australia) Rinky Hijikata	6	6^{11}	4
(South Africa) Lloyd Harris	4	7^{13}	1^{r}
(Switzerland) Alexander Ritschard	1	6^{6}
22	(Italy) Fabio Fognini	6	7^{8}

Qualifying competition
5	(Australia) Rinky Hijikata	4	7	5
22	(Italy) Fabio Fognini	6	5	7

==== Sixth qualifier ====
First round
6	(Netherlands) Botic van de Zandschulp	6	6
WC	(France) Moïse Kouamé	3	2
(Argentina) Juan Manuel Cerúndolo	6	6
21	(Brazil) Thiago Seyboth Wild	4	4

Qualifying competition
6	(Netherlands) Botic van de Zandschulp	6^{3}	7	6^{5}
(Argentina) Juan Manuel Cerúndolo	7^{7}	5	7^{7}

==== Seventh qualifier ====
First round
7	(Hungary) Márton Fucsovics	6	3	2
PR	(Croatia) Borna Gojo	2	6	6
(Switzerland) Jérôme Kym	4	0
13	(United States) Mackenzie McDonald	6	2^{r}

Qualifying competition
PR	(Croatia) Borna Gojo	7^{14}	6
(Switzerland) Jérôme Kym	6^{12}	3

==== Eighth qualifier ====
First round
8	(Poland) Kamil Majchrzak	6	6
WC	(United States) Darwin Blanch	1	4
(Denmark) Elmer Møller	6	6
19	(United States) Nishesh Basavareddy	1	1

Qualifying competition
8	(Poland) Kamil Majchrzak	7	4	4
(Denmark) Elmer Møller	5	6	6

==== Ninth qualifier ====
First round
9	(Brazil) Thiago Monteiro	7	6
(United States) Mitchell Krueger	5	3
(United States) Ethan Quinn	6	6
18	(United Kingdom) Billy Harris	3	4

Qualifying competition
9	(Brazil) Thiago Monteiro	6	6^{5}	6^{0}
(United States) Ethan Quinn	2	7^{7}	7^{7}

==== Tenth qualifier ====
First round
10	(Netherlands) Jesper de Jong	6	6^{4}	4
(United States) Tristan Boyer	3	7^{7}	6
(France) Harold Mayot	6	7
17	(Kazakhstan) Alexander Shevchenko	2	5

Qualifying competition
(United States) Tristan Boyer	5	2
(France) Harold Mayot	7	6

==== Eleventh qualifier ====
First round
11	(Czech Republic) Vít Kopřiva	7	5	6
(Argentina) Román Andrés Burruchaga	5	7	4
(Japan) Taro Daniel	3	2
23	(France) Valentin Royer	6	6

Qualifying competition
11	(Czech Republic) Vít Kopřiva	1	6	7^{7}
23	(France) Valentin Royer	6	3	6^{3}

==== Twelfth qualifier ====
First round
12	(Serbia) Dušan Lajović	6	7^{8}
(Argentina) Thiago Agustín Tirante	3	6^{6}
(Chile) Cristian Garín	2	6	7
16	(Chinese Taipei) Tseng Chun-hsin	6	3	5

Qualifying competition
12	(Serbia) Dušan Lajović	6	6
(Chile) Cristian Garín	4	2
