= 2023 Open de Rennes – Singles =

Singles
- 2023 Open de Rennes

Final
- Champion: (United States) Maxime Cressy
- Runner-up: (France) Benjamin Bonzi
- Score: 6–3, 2–0 ret.

Events
Singles	Doubles
- Open de Rennes

Ugo Humbert was the defending champion but chose not to defend his title.

Maxime Cressy won the title after Benjamin Bonzi retired trailing 3–6, 0–2 in the final.

== Seeds ==
1. (France) Richard Gasquet (quarterfinals)
2. (France) Grégoire Barrère (semifinals)
3. (France) Quentin Halys (first round)
4. (France) Corentin Moutet (second round)
5. (France) Constant Lestienne (first round)
6. (Moldova) Radu Albot (quarterfinals)
7. (United Kingdom) Liam Broady (first round)
8. (France) Benjamin Bonzi (final, retired)

== Draw ==
Key

- Q = Qualifier
- WC = Wild card
- LL = Lucky loser
- Alt = Alternate
- ITF = ITF entry
- PR = Protected ranking
- SR = Special ranking
- SE = Special exempt
- JE = Junior exempt
- JR = Junior Accelerator Programme entrant
- CO = College Accelerator Programme entrant
- NG = Next Gen Accelerator Program entrant
- w/o = Walkover
- r = Retired
- d = Defaulted

=== Finals ===
Semifinals
8	(France) Benjamin Bonzi	6	6
Q	(France) Matteo Martineau	4	4
(United States) Maxime Cressy	7^{7}	7^{7}
2	(France) Grégoire Barrère	6^{3}	6^{4}

Final
8	(France) Benjamin Bonzi	3	0^{r}
(United States) Maxime Cressy	6	2

=== Top half ===
First round
1	(France) R Gasquet	7	6
(France) Jules Marie	5	3
(Italy) L Nardi	4	6	1
Alt	(France) M Guinard	6	3	6
(Belgium) G Onclin	6	6
(Italy) G Zeppieri	2	2
Q	(France) Maxence Beaugé	6^{3}	1
8	(France) B Bonzi	7^{7}	6
3	(France) Q Halys	7^{7}	4	3
(France) A Escoffier	6^{5}	6	6
Alt	(Jordan) A Shelbayh	0	1
Q	(France) M Martineau	6	6
(France) T Droguet	6	2	6
WC	(France) D Added	1	6	4
PR	(France) L Pouille	6	3	6
5	(France) C Lestienne	2	6	1

Second round
1	(France) R Gasquet	6	7
Alt	(France) M Guinard	3	5
(Belgium) G Onclin	1	2
8	(France) B Bonzi	6	6
(France) A Escoffier	5	7^{10}	2
Q	(France) M Martineau	7	6^{8}	6
(France) T Droguet	4	2
PR	(France) L Pouille	6	6

Quarterfinals
1	(France) R Gasquet	6^{5}	0
8	(France) B Bonzi	7^{7}	6
Q	(France) M Martineau	2
PR	(France) L Pouille	2^{r}

Semifinals
8	(France) B Bonzi	6	6
Q	(France) M Martineau	4	4

=== Bottom half ===
First round
7	(United Kingdom) L Broady	4	4
(Belgium) Z Bergs	6	6
(Austria) M Neuchrist	4	2
(Italy) M Bellucci	6	6
(United States) M Cressy	7^{7}	7^{7}
(United States) Em Nava	6^{2}	6^{4}
LL	(Ivory Coast) E Coulibaly	4	1
4/WC	(France) C Moutet	6	6
6	(Moldova) R Albot	6	6
(Estonia) M Lajal	1	2
Q	(France) G Debru	3	3
WC	(France) L Poullain	6	6
Q	(Spain) A Moro Cañas	2	6	7
Q	A Vatutin	6	1	5
Q	(Poland) K Żuk	3	1
2	(France) G Barrère	6	6

Second round
(Belgium) Z Bergs	5	3
(Italy) M Bellucci	7	6
(United States) M Cressy	7^{7}	6
4/WC	(France) C Moutet	6^{1}	2
6	(Moldova) R Albot	6	7^{7}
WC	(France) L Poullain	3	6^{2}
Q	(Spain) A Moro Cañas	3	6	3
2	(France) G Barrère	6	4	6

Quarterfinals
(Italy) M Bellucci	6^{2}	5
(United States) M Cressy	7^{7}	7
6	(Moldova) R Albot	2	2
2	(France) G Barrère	6	6

Semifinals
(United States) M Cressy	7^{7}	7^{7}
2	(France) G Barrère	6^{3}	6^{4}
