= 2023 Open de Rennes =

- Date: 11–17 September
- Edition: 17th
- Surface: Hard (Indoor)
- Location: Rennes, France

Champions

Singles
- (United States) Maxime Cressy

Doubles
- (Netherlands) Sander Arends / (Netherlands) David Pel
- Open de Rennes

The 2023 Open Blot Rennes was a professional tennis tournament played on hard courts. It was the 17th edition of the tournament and part of the 2023 ATP Challenger Tour. It took place in Rennes, France between 11 and 17 September 2023.

== Singles main-draw entrants ==
=== Seeds ===
Country	Player	Rank^{1}	Seed
FRA	Richard Gasquet	55	1
FRA	Grégoire Barrère	59	2
FRA	Quentin Halys	70	3
FRA	Corentin Moutet	72	4
FRA	Constant Lestienne	101	5
MDA	Radu Albot	102	6
GBR	Liam Broady	107	7
FRA	Benjamin Bonzi	108	8

- ^{1} Rankings are as of 28 August 2023.

=== Other entrants ===
The following players received wildcards into the singles main draw:

- (France) Dan Added
- (France) Corentin Moutet
- (France) Lucas Poullain

The following player received entry into the singles main draw using a protected ranking:

- (France) Lucas Pouille

The following players received entry into the singles main draw as alternates:

- (France) Manuel Guinard
- (Jordan) Abdullah Shelbayh

The following players received entry from the qualifying draw:

- (France) Maxence Beaugé
- (France) Gabriel Debru
- (France) Mattteo Martineau
- (Spain) Alejandro Moro Cañas
- Alexey Vatutin
- (Poland) Kacper Żuk

The following player received entry as a lucky loser:

- (Ivory Coast) Eliakim Coulibaly

== Champions ==
=== Singles ===
- (United States) Maxime Cressy def. (France) Benjamin Bonzi 6–3, 2–0 ret.

=== Doubles ===
- (Netherlands) Sander Arends / (Netherlands) David Pel def. (France) Antoine Escoffier / (India) Niki Kaliyanda Poonacha 6–3, 6–2.
