= Grégoire Jacq =

French tennis player

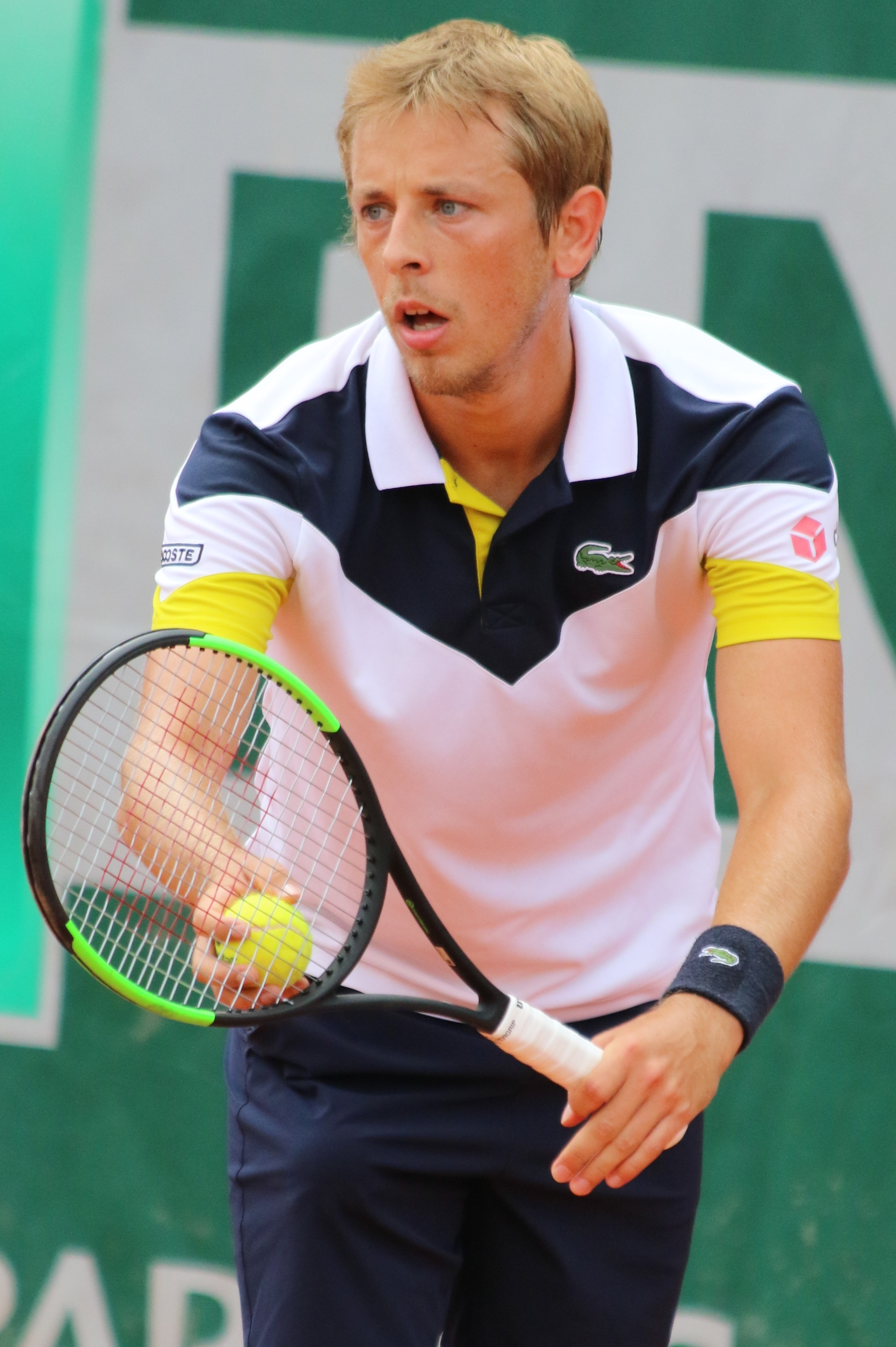
- Jacq at the 2018 French Open
- Country (sports): France
- Residence: Villiers-sur-Morin, France
- Born: 9 November 1992 (age 33) Clermont-Ferrand, France
- Height: 1.80 m (5 ft 11 in)
- Plays: Left-handed (two-handed backhand)
- Coach: Frantois-Xavier Paulin
- Prize money: $ 332,552

Singles
- Career record: 0–0
- Career titles: 5 Futures
- Highest ranking: No. 332 (29 October 2018)

Doubles
- Career record: 17–22 (at ATP Tour level, Grand Slam level, and in Davis Cup)
- Career titles: 10 Challenger, 19 Futures
- Highest ranking: No. 59 (3 February 2025)
- Current ranking: No. 100 (3 November 2025)

Grand Slam doubles results
- Australian Open: 2R (2025)
- French Open: 3R (2024)
- Wimbledon: 1R (2025)
- US Open: 1R (2024)

Grand Slam mixed doubles results
- French Open: 1R (2025, 2026)
- Last updated on: 6 November 2025.

Grégoire Jacq (born 9 November 1992) is a French tennis player who specializes in doubles. He has a career high ATP doubles ranking of world No. 59 achieved on 3 February 2025. Jacq has won 10 ATP Challenger doubles titles. He also has a career high singles ranking of No. 332 achieved on 29 October 2018.

== Career ==
=== 2017: Major debut in doubles ===
Jacq made his main draw debut at the 2017 French Open after receiving a wildcard to the doubles main draw with Hugo Nys. They were defeated by Jan-Lennard Struff and Mischa Zverev in the first round.

=== 2023-2025: First ATP finals, top 75 debut ===
Following five doubles Challenger titles starting in June 2023 and another two in the first three months of 2024 (six of the total with Manuel Guinard), he reached a career high doubles ranking of No. 97 on 6 May 2024. Next, the French duo Jacq/Guinard entered their home Slam, the 2024 French Open as alternates, and on their Major debut as a team, defeated 14th seeded American pair of Nathaniel Lammons and Jackson Withrow in the first round. They reached the third round with a win over Guido Andreozzi and Rinky Hijikata. They lost to the Tsitsipas brothers.

He reached his first ATP final with Guinard at the 2024 Swedish Open defeating defending champions and top seeded pair of Aleksandr Nedovyesov and Gonzalo Escobar. They lost to Brazilian duo Rafael Matos and Orlando Luz. The following week the pair reached their second ATP final at the 2024 Croatia Open Umag. As a result he reached the top 70 in the doubles rankings on 29 July 2024.

At the 2025 Australian Open Jacq recorded his first win at the tournament, partnering Orlando Luz, over alternate pair Jeevan Nedunchezhiyan and Vijay Sundar Prashanth.

== ATP Tour career finals ==
=== Doubles: 2 (2 runners-up) ===
Legend Grand Slam tournaments (0–0) ATP Masters 1000 (0–0) ATP 500 (0–0) ATP 250 (0–2)	Finals by surface Hard (0–0) Clay (0–2) Grass (0–0)	Finals by setting Outdoor (0–2) Indoor (0–0)

Result	W–L	Date	Tournament	Tier	Surface	Partner	Opponents	Score
Loss	0–1	Jul 2024	Swedish Open, Sweden	250 Series	Clay	(France) Manuel Guinard	(Brazil) Orlando Luz (Brazil) Rafael Matos	5–7, 4–6
Loss	0–2	Jul 2024	Croatia Open, Croatia	250 Series	Clay	(France) Manuel Guinard	(Argentina) Guido Andreozzi (Mexico) Miguel Ángel Reyes-Varela	4–6, 2–6

== ATP Challenger and ITF Tour finals ==
=== Singles: 13 (5–8) ===
Legend ATP Challenger (0–0) ITF Futures (5–8)	Finals by surface Hard (2–4) Clay (2–4) Grass (0–0) Carpet (1–0)

Result	W–L	Date	Tournament	Tier	Surface	Opponent	Score
Loss	0–1	Jun 2015	Bulgaria F3, Blagoevgrad	Futures	Clay	(Russia) Ivan Nedelko	6–3, 4–6, 2–6
Loss	0–2	Aug 2015	Turkey F32, Sakarya	Futures	Hard	(France) Yannick Jankovits	4–6, 4–6
Win	1–2	Mar 2016	Italy F1, Trento	Futures	Carpet	(Germany) Dominik Boehler	6–1, 6–4
Loss	1–3	May 2016	Algeria F2, Algiers	Futures	Clay	(Spain) Mario Vilella Martínez	4–6, 2–6
Loss	1–4	Jun 2016	France F10, Mont-de-Marsan	Futures	Clay	(France) Maxime Hamou	4–6, 5–7
Win	2–4	Jun 2016	Germany F4, Kaltenkirchen	Futures	Clay	(Germany) Yannick Maden	3–6, 3–2 ret.
Loss	2–5	Aug 2016	Slovakia F3, Slovenska Lupca	Futures	Clay	(Czech Republic) Petr Michnev	5–7, 2–6
Loss	2–6	Oct 2016	France F21, Nevers	Futures	Hard	(France) Albano Olivetti	6–7^{(6–8)}, 3–6
Loss	2–7	Jan 2017	France F2, Bressuire	Futures	Hard	(France) Gleb Sakharov	3–6, 3–6
Win	3–7	Aug 2017	Slovakia F2, Piešťany	Futures	Clay	(Slovakia) Lukas Klein	6–4, 3–6, 6–3
Loss	3–8	Sep 2018	France F17, Mulhouse	Futures	Hard	(Spain) Andres Artunedo Martinavarro	6–7^{(6–8)}, 5–7
Win	4–8	Oct 2018	France F20, Nevers	Futures	Hard	(France) Gleb Sakharov	6–3, 6–2
Win	5–8	Oct 2018	France F22, Rodez	Futures	Hard	(France) Rémi Boutillier	7–6^{(7–5)}, 6–4

=== Doubles: 53 (29 titles, 24 runners-up) ===
Legend (doubles) ATP Challenger Tour (10–3) ITF Futures Tour (19–21)	Titles by surface Hard (8–12) Clay (19–9) Grass (0–0) Carpet (1–3)

==== ATP Challengers Finals (10–3) ====
Result	W–L	Date	Tournament	Tier	Surface	Partner	Opponents	Score
Loss	0–1	Jun 2023	Troisdorf, Germany	Challenger	Clay	(France) Manuel Guinard	(Spain) Íñigo Cervantes (Spain) Oriol Roca Batalla	2–6, 6–7^{(1–7)}
Win	1–1	Jun 2023	Lyon, France	Challenger	Clay	(France) Manuel Guinard	(Germany) Constantin Frantzen (Germany) Hendrik Jebens	6–4, 2–6, [10–7]
Win	2–1	Jun 2023	Blois, France	Challenger	Clay	(France) Dan Added	(France) Théo Arribagé (France) Luca Sanchez	6–4, 6–4
Win	3–1	Jul 2023	Troyes, France	Challenger	Clay	(France) Manuel Guinard	(Spain) Álvaro López San Martín (Spain) Daniel Rincón	Walkover
Win	4–1	Jul 2023	Amersfoort, Netherlands	Challenger	Clay	(France) Manuel Guinard	(Netherlands) Mats Hermans (Netherlands) Sander Jong	6–4, 6–4
Win	5–1	Aug 2023	Meerbusch, Germany	Challenger	Clay	(France) Manuel Guinard	(Brazil) Fernando Romboli (Brazil) Marcelo Zormann	7–5, 7–6
Win	6–1	Jan 2024	Nonthaburi, Thailand	Challenger	Hard	(France) Manuel Guinard	(Philippines) Francis Casey Alcantara (China) Sun Fajing	6–4, 7–6^{(8–6)}
Win	7–1	Mar 2024	Zadar, Croatia	Challenger	Clay	(France) Manuel Guinard	(Czech Republic) Roman Jebavý (Czech Republic) Zdeněk Kolář	6–4, 6–4
Win	8–1	Jun 2024	Lyon, France	Challenger	Clay	(France) Manuel Guinard	(Greece) Markos Kalovelonis (Ukraine) Vladyslav Orlov	4–7, 6–3, [10–6]
Loss	8–2	Jul 2024	Karlsruhe, Germany	Challenger	Clay	(France) Dan Added	(Germany) Jakob Schnaitter (Germany) Mark Wallner	4–6, 0–6
Win	9–2	Jul 2024	Salzburg, Austria	Challenger	Clay	(France) Manuel Guinard	(Czech Republic) Petr Nouza (Czech Republic) Patrik Rikl	2–6, 6–3, [14–12]
Win	10–2	Sep 2024	Rennes, France	Challenger	Clay	(Netherlands) Sander Arends	(France) Antoine Escoffier (United Kingdom) Joshua Paris	6–4, 6–2
Loss	10–3	Sep 2024	Orléans, France	Challenger	Hard (i)	(France) Manuel Guinard	(France) Benjamin Bonzi (France) Sascha Gueymard Wayenburg	6–7^{(7–9)}, 6–4, [5-10]
