= 2025 Monte-Carlo Masters – Doubles =

Doubles
- 2025 Monte-Carlo Masters

Final
- Champions: (Monaco) Romain Arneodo (France) Manuel Guinard
- Runners-up: (United Kingdom) Julian Cash (United Kingdom) Lloyd Glasspool
- Score: 1–6, 7–6^{(10–8)}, [10–8]

Events
Singles	Doubles
← 2024 ·	Monte-Carlo Masters	· 2026 →

Romain Arneodo and Manuel Guinard defeated Julian Cash and Lloyd Glasspool in the final, 1–6, 7–6^{(10–8)}, [10–8] to win the doubles tennis title at the 2025 Monte-Carlo Masters. It was both players' first Masters 1000 title, and the first ATP Tour title for Guinard and second for Arneodo. Arneodo was the first Monégasque champion in the tournament's history.

Sander Gillé and Joran Vliegen were the reigning champions, but chose not to compete together this year. Gillé partnered Jan Zieliński, but lost in the first round to Máximo González and Andrés Molteni. Vliegen partnered Rafael Matos, but lost in the quarterfinals to Harri Heliövaara and Henry Patten.

Aged 45 years and 1 month, Rohan Bopanna became the oldest man to win a Masters 1000 match, surpassing the record previously held by Daniel Nestor. Bopanna was attempting to extend his own record as the oldest man to win a Masters 1000 title, but lost in the quarterfinals.

== Seeds ==
The top four seeds received a bye into the second round.

1. (El Salvador) Marcelo Arévalo / (Croatia) Mate Pavić (semifinals)
2. (Finland) Harri Heliövaara / (United Kingdom) Henry Patten (semifinals)
3. (Italy) Simone Bolelli / (Italy) Andrea Vavassori (second round)
4. (Germany) Kevin Krawietz / (Germany) Tim Pütz (quarterfinals)
5. (Spain) Marcel Granollers / (Argentina) Horacio Zeballos (first round)
6. (Croatia) Nikola Mektić / (New Zealand) Michael Venus (first round)
7. (United Kingdom) Julian Cash / (United Kingdom) Lloyd Glasspool (final)
8. (Argentina) Máximo González / (Argentina) Andrés Molteni (second round)

== Draw ==
=== Key ===
- Q = Qualifier
- WC = Wild card
- LL = Lucky loser
- Alt = Alternate
- ITF = ITF entry
- PR = Protected ranking
- SR = Special ranking
- SE = Special exempt
- JE = Junior exempt
- JR = Junior Accelerator Programme entrant
- CO = College Accelerator Programme entrant
- NG = Next Gen Accelerator Program entrant
- w/o = Walkover
- r = Retired
- d = Defaulted

=== Finals ===
Semifinals
1	(El Salvador) Marcelo Arévalo (Croatia) Mate Pavić	6^{2}	7^{7}	[6]
7	(United Kingdom) Julian Cash (United Kingdom) Lloyd Glasspool	7^{7}	6^{5}	[10]
WC	(Monaco) Romain Arneodo (France) Manuel Guinard	6	7
2	(Finland) Harri Heliövaara (United Kingdom) Henry Patten	4	5

Final
7	(United Kingdom) Julian Cash (United Kingdom) Lloyd Glasspool	6	6^{8}	[8]
WC	(Monaco) Romain Arneodo (France) Manuel Guinard	1	7^{10}	[10]

=== Top half ===
First round
(France) S Doumbia (France) F Reboul	6	6
(United States) R Galloway (United States) J Withrow	4	2
(Australia) A de Minaur (Germany) J-L Struff	5	7	[10]
(India) Y Bhambri (Australia) A Popyrin	7	5	[5]
(Belgium) S Gillé (Poland) J Zieliński	6^{5}	1
8	(Argentina) M González (Argentina) A Molteni	7^{7}	6
(United Kingdom) J Murray (United States) R Ram	7^{7}	5	[5]
(Monaco) H Nys (France) É Roger-Vasselin	6^{3}	7	[10]
WC	(Greece) Pe Tsitsipas (Greece) S Tsitsipas	4	7^{9}	[10]
(United States) C Harrison (United States) E King	6	6^{7}	[8]
(Brazil) M Melo (Germany) A Zverev	1	4
7	(United Kingdom) J Cash (United Kingdom) L Glasspool	6	6

Second round
1	(El Salvador) M Arévalo (Croatia) M Pavić	6	3	[10]
(France) S Doumbia (France) F Reboul	3	6	[7]
(Australia) A de Minaur (Germany) J-L Struff	3	6	[10]
8	(Argentina) M González (Argentina) A Molteni	6	2	[6]
4	(Germany) K Krawietz (Germany) T Pütz	6	6^{4}	[14]
(Monaco) H Nys (France) É Roger-Vasselin	3	7^{7}	[12]
WC	(Greece) Pe Tsitsipas (Greece) S Tsitsipas	1	6^{5}
7	(United Kingdom) J Cash (United Kingdom) L Glasspool	6	7^{7}

Quarterfinals
1	(El Salvador) M Arévalo (Croatia) M Pavić	6	3	[10]
(Australia) A de Minaur (Germany) J-L Struff	3	6	[2]
4	(Germany) K Krawietz (Germany) T Pütz	4	2
7	(United Kingdom) J Cash (United Kingdom) L Glasspool	6	6

Semifinals
1	(El Salvador) M Arévalo (Croatia) M Pavić	6^{2}	7^{7}	[6]
7	(United Kingdom) J Cash (United Kingdom) L Glasspool	7^{7}	6^{5}	[10]

=== Bottom half ===
First round
5	(Spain) M Granollers (Argentina) H Zeballos	3	6	[8]
WC	(Monaco) R Arneodo (France) M Guinard	6	4	[10]
(United States) S Korda (Australia) J Thompson	3	6^{4}
(United Kingdom) J Draper (Czech Republic) T Macháč	6	7^{7}
(India) R Bopanna (United States) B Shelton	6	7
(Argentina) F Cerúndolo (Chile) A Tabilo	3	5
6	(Croatia) N Mektić (New Zealand) M Venus	4	2
K Khachanov; A Rublev	6	6
Alt	(Brazil) R Matos (Belgium) J Vliegen	6	6^{7}	[10]
WC	(France) A Rinderknech (Monaco) V Vacherot	4	7^{9}	[2]
(United Kingdom) J Salisbury (United Kingdom) N Skupski	7^{7}	6
(Australia) M Ebden (Australia) J Peers	6^{5}	3

Second round
WC	(Monaco) R Arneodo (France) M Guinard	w/o
(United Kingdom) J Draper (Czech Republic) T Macháč
(India) R Bopanna (United States) B Shelton	2	7^{7}	[10]
3	(Italy) S Bolelli (Italy) A Vavassori	6	6^{4}	[7]
K Khachanov; A Rublev
Alt	(Brazil) R Matos (Belgium) J Vliegen	w/o
(United Kingdom) J Salisbury (United Kingdom) N Skupski	3	3
2	(Finland) H Heliövaara (United Kingdom) H Patten	6	6

Quarterfinals
WC	(Monaco) R Arneodo (France) M Guinard	6	4	[10]
(India) R Bopanna (United States) B Shelton	2	6	[7]
Alt	(Brazil) R Matos (Belgium) J Vliegen	1	6	[5]
2	(Finland) H Heliövaara (United Kingdom) H Patten	6	3	[10]

Semifinals
WC	(Monaco) R Arneodo (France) M Guinard	6	7
2	(Finland) H Heliövaara (United Kingdom) H Patten	4	5
