= 2026 Swiss Indoors =

- Date: 26 October–1 November
- Edition: 55th
- Category: ATP 500
- Draw: 32S / 16D
- Surface: Hard / indoor
- Location: Basel, Switzerland
- Venue: St. Jakobshalle

Champions

Singles
- (Monaco) Valentin Vacherot

Doubles
- (France) Théo Arribagé / (France) Albano Olivetti
- Swiss Indoors

The 2026 Swiss Indoors Basel was a men's tennis tournament played on indoor hardcourts. It was the 55th edition of the event, and part of the ATP 500 tournaments of the 2026 ATP Tour. It took place at the St. Jakobshalle in Basel, Switzerland, from 26 October to 1 November 2026.

== Finals ==
=== Singles ===
- (Monaco) Valentin Vacherot def. (Czech Republic) Jiří Lehečka, 2–6, 6–3, 6–3

=== Doubles ===
- (France) Théo Arribagé / (France) Albano Olivetti def. (Switzerland) Henry Bernet / (Switzerland) Dominic Stricker, 7–6^{(8–6)}, 7–6^{(8–6)}

== Singles main draw entrants ==
Valentin Vacherot holds the trophy after defeating eighth-seeded Jiri Lehecka 2–6, 6–3, 6–3 in the final of Swiss Indoors Basel 2026.

=== Seeds ===
Country	Player	Rank^{1}	Seed
USA	Ben Shelton	4	1
FRA	Arthur Fils	10	2
ESP	Rafael Jódar	11	3
SRB	Novak Djokovic	12	4
~~ESP~~	~~Alejandro Davidovich Fokina~~	~~13~~	~~5~~
USA	Taylor Fritz	14	6
~~KAZ~~	~~Alexander Bublik~~	~~19~~	~~7~~
CZE	Jiří Lehečka	20	8
NOR	Casper Ruud	24	9
POL	Hubert Hurkacz	30	10

- Rankings are as of 19 October 2026

=== Other entrants ===
The following players received wildcards into the singles main draw:

- (Serbia) Novak Djokovic
- (Switzerland) Jérôme Kym
- (Switzerland) Dominic Stricker
- (Switzerland) Stan Wawrinka

The following player received entry as a special exempt:

- (Germany) Jan-Lennard Struff

The following players received entry from the qualifying draw:

- (Switzerland) Rémy Bertola
- (Argentina) Juan Manuel Cerúndolo
- (Germany) Yannick Hanfmann
- (France) Giovanni Mpetshi Perricard

The following players received entry as lucky losers:

- (Germany) Daniel Altmaier
- (Switzerland) Mika Brunold
- (Australia) Rinky Hijikata
- (United States) Aleksandar Kovacevic

=== Withdrawals ===
- (Canada) Félix Auger-Aliassime → replaced by (France) Quentin Halys
- (Kazakhstan) Alexander Bublik → replaced by (United States) Aleksandar Kovacevic
- (Belgium) Raphaël Collignon → replaced by (Switzerland) Mika Brunold
- (Spain) Alejandro Davidovich Fokina → replaced by (Germany) Daniel Altmaier
- (Brazil) João Fonseca → replaced by (Portugal) Nuno Borges
- (Greece) Stefanos Tsitsipas → replaced by (Australia) Rinky Hijikata

== Doubles main draw entrants ==
=== Seeds ===
Country	Player	Country	Player	Rank^{1}	Seed
GER	Kevin Krawietz	GER	Tim Pütz	23	1
GBR	Julian Cash	GBR	Lloyd Glasspool	26	2
FRA	Théo Arribagé	FRA	Albano Olivetti	41	3
POR	Francisco Cabral	USA	JJ Tracy	55	4

- ^{1} Rankings as of 19 October 2026

=== Other entrants ===
The following pairs received wildcards into the doubles main draw:

- (Switzerland) Henry Bernet / (Switzerland) Dominic Stricker
- (Switzerland) Jakub Paul / (Czech Republic) Matěj Vocel

The following pair received entry from the qualifying draw:

- (France) Arthur Reymond / (France) Luca Sanchez
