= 2022 Tiburon Challenger – Singles =

Singles
- 2022 Tiburon Challenger

Final
- Champion: (United States) Zachary Svajda
- Runner-up: (United States) Ben Shelton
- Score: 2–6, 6–2, 6–4

Events
Singles	Doubles
← 2019 ·	Tiburon Challenger	· 2023 →

Tommy Paul was the defending champion but chose not to defend his title.

Zachary Svajda won the title after defeating Ben Shelton 2–6, 6–2, 6–4 in the final.

== Seeds ==
1. (United States) Denis Kudla (semifinals, retired)
2. (United States) Stefan Kozlov (second round)
3. (United States) Michael Mmoh (second round)
4. (United States) Ben Shelton (final)
5. (France) Enzo Couacaud (quarterfinals)
6. (China) Shang Juncheng (first round)
7. (United States) Ernesto Escobedo (quarterfinals)
8. (United States) Mitchell Krueger (quarterfinals)

== Draw ==
=== Key ===
- Q = Qualifier
- WC = Wild card
- LL = Lucky loser
- Alt = Alternate
- SE = Special exempt
- PR = Protected ranking
- ITF = ITF entry
- JE = Junior exempt
- w/o = Walkover
- r = Retired
- d = Defaulted
- SR = Special ranking

=== Finals ===
Semifinals
1	(United States) Denis Kudla	6	4	0^{r}
4	(United States) Ben Shelton	3	6	3
(United States) Zachary Svajda	6	6
(Canada) Alexis Galarneau	4	4

Final
4	(United States) Ben Shelton	6	2	4
(United States) Zachary Svajda	2	6	6

=== Top half ===
First round
1	(United States) D Kudla	6	2
(United States) B Holt	4	1^{r}
WC	(United States) P Kypson	6	4	1
(Switzerland) L Riedi	2	6	6
Q	(United States) Christian Langmo	3	4
Q	(Australia) L Saville	6	6
(United Kingdom) C Broom	3	3
5	(France) E Couacaud	6	6
4	(United States) B Shelton	3	6	7^{7}
(Ecuador) R Quiroz	6	2	6^{4}
WC	(United States) S Riffice	6^{6}	7	6
Q	(United States) E King	7^{8}	5	1
Q	(United States) N Chappell	7^{7}	3	6
(Colombia) N Mejía	6^{4}	6	1
Alt	(Greece) M Pervolarakis	3	6^{2}
8	(United States) M Krueger	6	7^{7}

Second round
1	(United States) D Kudla	6	6
(Switzerland) L Riedi	2	3
Q	(Australia) L Saville	6	0	3
5	(France) E Couacaud	4	6	6
4	(United States) B Shelton	6	6
WC	(United States) S Riffice	3	2
Q	(United States) N Chappell	3	7^{8}	5
8	(United States) M Krueger	6	6^{6}	7

Quarterfinals
1	(United States) D Kudla	7	7^{10}
5	(France) E Couacaud	5	6^{8}
4	(United States) B Shelton	6	6
8	(United States) M Krueger	3	4

Semifinals
1	(United States) D Kudla	6	4	0^{r}
4	(United States) B Shelton	3	6	3

=== Bottom half ===
First round
7	(United States) E Escobedo	6	6
WC	(Sweden) Jonas Eriksson Ziverts	2	4
(United States) E Zhu	6	4	4
(Monaco) V Vacherot	4	6	6
Q	(Denmark) A Holmgren	6	3	6^{5}
(United States) Z Svajda	4	6	7^{7}
Alt	(Zimbabwe) B Lock	1	3
3	(United States) M Mmoh	6	6
6	(China) J Shang	5	6	6^{5}
Q	(United States) A Michelsen	7	4	7^{7}
(United States) G Nanda	5	6	3
(United Kingdom) P Jubb	7	4	6
(Germany) S Fanselow	5	6	3
(Canada) A Galarneau	7	4	6
Alt	(Italy) G Oradini	1	4
2	(United States) S Kozlov	6	6

Second round
7	(United States) E Escobedo	6	6
(Monaco) V Vacherot	2	4
(United States) Z Svajda	6	5	7^{7}
3	(United States) M Mmoh	3	7	6^{4}
Q	(United States) A Michelsen	2	3
(United Kingdom) P Jubb	6	6
(Canada) A Galarneau	6	7
2	(United States) S Kozlov	1	5

Quarterfinals
7	(United States) E Escobedo	3	6^{3}
(United States) Z Svajda	6	7^{7}
(United Kingdom) P Jubb	3	7^{7}	4
(Canada) A Galarneau	6	6^{3}	6

Semifinals
(United States) Z Svajda	6	6
(Canada) A Galarneau	4	4
