= 2025 Monte-Carlo Masters =

- Date: 6–13 April
- Edition: 118th
- Category: Masters 1000
- Draw: 56S / 28D
- Prize money: €6,128,940
- Surface: Clay
- Location: Roquebrune-Cap-Martin, France (billed as Monte Carlo, Monaco)
- Venue: Monte Carlo Country Club

Champions

Singles
- (Spain) Carlos Alcaraz

Doubles
- (Monaco) Romain Arneodo / (France) Manuel Guinard
← 2024 ·	Monte-Carlo Masters	· 2026 →

The 2025 Monte-Carlo Masters (also known as the Rolex Monte-Carlo Masters for sponsorship reasons) was a tennis tournament for male professionals played on outdoor clay courts. It was the 118th edition of the annual Monte Carlo Masters tournament, sponsored by Rolex for the 16th time. It was held at the Monte Carlo Country Club in Roquebrune-Cap-Martin, France (though billed as Monte Carlo, Monaco). The event was an ATP Masters 1000 tournament on the 2025 ATP Tour.

== Champions ==
=== Singles ===
- (Spain) Carlos Alcaraz def. (Italy) Lorenzo Musetti 3–6, 6–1, 6–0

=== Doubles ===
- (Monaco) Romain Arneodo / (France) Manuel Guinard def. (United Kingdom) Julian Cash / (United Kingdom) Lloyd Glasspool, 1–6, 7–6^{(10–8)}, [10–8]

== Points ==
Because the Monte Carlo Masters is a non-mandatory Masters 1000 event, special rules regarding points distribution are in place. The Monte Carlo Masters counts as one of a player's 500 level tournaments, while distributing Masters 1000 points.

Event	W	F	SF	QF	Round of 16	Round of 32	Round of 64	Q	Q2	Q1
Singles	1,000	650	400	200	100	50	10	30	16	0
Doubles	1,000	600	360	180	90	0	—	—	—	—

== Singles main draw entrants ==
=== Seeds ===
Country	Player	Rank^{1}	Seed
GER	Alexander Zverev	2	1
ESP	Carlos Alcaraz	3	2
SRB	Novak Djokovic	5	3
NOR	Casper Ruud	6	4
GBR	Jack Draper	7	5
GRE	Stefanos Tsitsipas	8	6
	Andrey Rublev	9	7
AUS	Alex de Minaur	10	8
	Daniil Medvedev	11	9
DEN	Holger Rune	12	10
USA	Ben Shelton	14	11
FRA	Arthur Fils	15	12
ITA	Lorenzo Musetti	16	13
USA	Frances Tiafoe	17	14
BUL	Grigor Dimitrov	18	15
CAN	Félix Auger-Aliassime	19	16

^{1} Rankings are as of 31 March 2024

=== Other entrants ===
The following players received wildcards into the main draw:

- (Italy) Fabio Fognini
- (France) Richard Gasquet
- (Monaco) Valentin Vacherot
- (Switzerland) Stan Wawrinka

The following players received entry via the qualifying draw:

- (Germany) Daniel Altmaier
- (China) Bu Yunchaokete
- (Serbia) Dušan Lajović
- (Hungary) Fábián Marozsán
- (France) Corentin Moutet
- (Argentina) Mariano Navone
- (Argentina) Camilo Ugo Carabelli

=== Withdrawals ===
- (United States) Taylor Fritz → replaced by (Spain) Roberto Bautista Agut
- (Poland) Hubert Hurkacz → replaced by (Serbia) Miomir Kecmanović

== Doubles main draw entrants ==
=== Seeds ===
Country	Player	Country	Player	Rank	Seed
ESA	Marcelo Arévalo	CRO	Mate Pavić	2	1
FIN	Harri Heliövaara	GBR	Henry Patten	7	2
ITA	Simone Bolelli	ITA	Andrea Vavassori	13	3
GER	Kevin Krawietz	GER	Tim Pütz	17	4
ESP	Marcel Granollers	ARG	Horacio Zeballos	21	5
CRO	Nikola Mektić	NZL	Michael Venus	27	6
GBR	Julian Cash	GBR	Lloyd Glasspool	31	7
ARG	Máximo González	ARG	Andrés Molteni	37	8

^{1} Rankings are as of 31 March 2025.

=== Other entrants ===
The following pairs received wildcards into the doubles main draw:

- (Monaco) Romain Arneodo / (France) Manuel Guinard
- (France) Arthur Rinderknech / (Monaco) Valentin Vacherot
- (Greece) Petros Tsitsipas / (Greece) Stefanos Tsitsipas

The following pair received entry as alternates:

- (Brazil) Rafael Matos / (Belgium) Joran Vliegen

=== Withdrawals ===
- (Bulgaria) Grigor Dimitrov / (Poland) Hubert Hurkacz → replaced by (United States) Christian Harrison / (United States) Evan King
- (France) Ugo Humbert / (Italy) Lorenzo Musetti → replaced by (Brazil) Rafael Matos / (Belgium) Joran Vliegen
