= 2022 Tiburon Challenger =

- Date: 3–9 October
- Edition: 14th
- Surface: Hard
- Location: Tiburon, United States

Champions

Singles
- (United States) Zachary Svajda

Doubles
- (Switzerland) Leandro Riedi / (Monaco) Valentin Vacherot
- Tiburon Challenger

The 2022 Tiburon Challenger was a professional tennis tournament played on outdoor hardcourts. It was the fourteenth edition of the tournament which was part of the 2022 ATP Challenger Tour. It took place in Tiburon, United States between October 3 and October 9, 2022.

== Singles main draw entrants ==
=== Seeds ===
Country	Player	Rank^{1}	Seed
USA	Denis Kudla	100	1
USA	Stefan Kozlov	127	2
USA	Michael Mmoh	134	3
USA	Ben Shelton	177	4
FRA	Enzo Couacaud	187	5
CHN	Shang Juncheng	197	6
USA	Ernesto Escobedo	200	7
USA	Mitchell Krueger	207	8

- ^{1} Rankings are as of September 26, 2022.

=== Other entrants ===
The following players received wildcards into the singles main draw:

- (Sweden) Jonas Eriksson Ziverts
- (United States) Patrick Kypson
- (United States) Sam Riffice

The following players received entry into the singles main draw as alternates:

- (Zimbabwe) Benjamin Lock
- (Italy) Giovanni Oradini
- (Greece) Michail Pervolarakis

The following players received entry from the qualifying draw:

- (United States) Nick Chappell
- (Denmark) August Holmgren
- (United States) Evan King
- (United States) Christian Langmo
- (United States) Alex Michelsen
- (Australia) Luke Saville

== Champions ==
=== Singles ===
- (United States) Zachary Svajda def. (United States) Ben Shelton 2–6, 6–2, 6–4.

=== Doubles ===
- (Switzerland) Leandro Riedi / (Monaco) Valentin Vacherot def. (United States) Ezekiel Clark / (United States) Alfredo Perez 6–7^{(2–7)}, 6–3, [10–2].
