= 2025 Abruzzo Open =

- Date: 5–11 May
- Edition: 7th
- Surface: Clay
- Location: Francavilla al Mare, Italy

Champions

Singles
- (Italy) Francesco Maestrelli

Doubles
- (Venezuela) Luis David Martínez / (Argentina) Facundo Mena
| ← 2024 · | Francavilla al Mare Open | · 2026 → |

The 2025 Abruzzo Open Francavilla al Mare was a professional tennis tournament played on clay courts. It was the seventh edition of the tournament which was part of the 2025 ATP Challenger Tour. It took place in Francavilla al Mare, Italy between 5 and 11 May 2025.

== Singles main-draw entrants ==
=== Seeds ===
| Country | Player | Rank^{1} | Seed |
|---|---|---|---|
| FRA | Kyrian Jacquet | 152 | 1 |
| CRO | Duje Ajduković | 167 | 2 |
| KAZ | Timofey Skatov | 172 | 3 |
| | Aslan Karatsev | 187 | 4 |
| ARG | Marco Trungelliti | 189 | 5 |
| ARG | Facundo Mena | 190 | 6 |
| EST | Mark Lajal | 199 | 7 |
| PER | Ignacio Buse | 210 | 8 |

- ^{1} Rankings are as of 21 April 2025.

=== Other entrants ===
The following players received wildcards into the singles main draw:

- (Italy) Lorenzo Carboni
- (Italy) Francesco Maestrelli
- (France) Benoît Paire

The following player received entry into the singles main draw through the Junior Accelerator Programme:

- (Romania) Luca Preda

The following players received entry into the singles main draw as alternates:

- (France) Clément Chidekh
- (Belgium) Kimmer Coppejans
- (Italy) Enrico Dalla Valle
- (France) Corentin Denolly
- (France) Mathys Erhard
- (Spain) Carlos Sánchez Jover
- (Switzerland) Dominic Stricker
- (Sweden) Elias Ymer

The following players received entry from the qualifying draw:

- (Italy) Jacopo Berrettini
- (Argentina) Pedro Cachin
- (Germany) Justin Engel
- (Italy) Giovanni Fonio
- (Italy) Stefano Travaglia
- Alexey Vatutin

== Champions ==
=== Singles ===
- (Italy) Francesco Maestrelli def. (Monaco) Valentin Vacherot 6–4, 6–4.

=== Doubles ===
- (Venezuela) Luis David Martínez / (Argentina) Facundo Mena def. (France) Théo Arribagé / (France) Grégoire Jacq 7–5, 2–6, [10–6].
