= 2025 Abruzzo Open – Singles =

Singles
- 2025 Abruzzo Open

Final
- Champion: (Italy) Francesco Maestrelli
- Runner-up: (Monaco) Valentin Vacherot
- Score: 6–4, 6–4

Events
Singles	Doubles
← 2024 ·	Francavilla al Mare Open	· 2026 →

Titouan Droguet was the defending champion but chose not to defend his title.

Francesco Maestrelli won the title after defeating Valentin Vacherot 6–4, 6–4 in the final.

== Seeds ==
1. (France) Kyrian Jacquet (second round)
2. (Croatia) Duje Ajduković (first round)
3. (Kazakhstan) Timofey Skatov (second round)
4. Aslan Karatsev (second round)
5. (Argentina) Marco Trungelliti (second round)
6. (Argentina) Facundo Mena (first round)
7. (Estonia) Mark Lajal (semifinals)
8. (Peru) Ignacio Buse (first round)

== Draw ==
=== Key ===
- Q = Qualifier
- WC = Wild card
- LL = Lucky loser
- Alt = Alternate
- ITF = ITF entry
- PR = Protected ranking
- SR = Special ranking
- SE = Special exempt
- JE = Junior exempt
- JR = Junior Accelerator Programme entrant
- CO = College Accelerator Programme entrant
- NG = Next Gen Accelerator Program entrant
- w/o = Walkover
- r = Retired
- d = Defaulted

=== Finals ===
Semifinals
Alt	(Switzerland) Dominic Stricker	6	6^{7}	0^{r}
WC	(Italy) Francesco Maestrelli	3	7^{9}	0
(Monaco) Valentin Vacherot	1	6	6
7	(Estonia) Mark Lajal	6	3	1

Final
WC	(Italy) Francesco Maestrelli	6	6
(Monaco) Valentin Vacherot	4	4

=== Top half ===
First round
1	(France) K Jacquet	6	6
JR	(Romania) L Preda	3	3
Alt	(Switzerland) D Stricker	7^{11}	6
(United Kingdom) P Jubb	6^{9}	3
Alt	(Belgium) K Coppejans	2	7	1
(Argentina) A Collarini	6	5	0^{r}
Q	(Argentina) P Cachin	2	5
5	(Argentina) M Trungelliti	6	7
3	(Kazakhstan) T Skatov	6	2	6
Q	(Germany) J Engel	4	6	4
WC	(France) B Paire	7	1	6
Q	(Italy) G Fonio	5	6	3
Alt	(France) C Denolly	5	5
WC	(Italy) F Maestrelli	7	7
(Moldova) R Albot	6	7^{7}
8	(Peru) I Buse	3	6^{2}

Second round
1	(France) K Jacquet	6	3	4
Alt	(Switzerland) D Stricker	1	6	6
Alt	(Belgium) K Coppejans	7^{7}	6
5	(Argentina) M Trungelliti	6^{5}	1
3	(Kazakhstan) T Skatov	6^{4}	6^{3}
WC	(France) B Paire	7^{7}	7^{7}
WC	(Italy) F Maestrelli	2	6	6
(Moldova) R Albot	6	3	2

Quarterfinals
Alt	(Switzerland) D Stricker	6	7
Alt	(Belgium) K Coppejans	2	5
WC	(France) B Paire	6	0	1
WC	(Italy) F Maestrelli	1	6	6

Semifinals
Alt	(Switzerland) D Stricker	6	6^{7}	0^{r}
WC	(Italy) F Maestrelli	3	7^{9}	0

=== Bottom half ===
First round
6	(Argentina) F Mena	4	4
Q	A Vatutin	6	6
Alt	(France) C Chidekh	1	0
(Monaco) V Vacherot	6	6
(France) G Barrère	6	5	5
Alt	(Sweden) E Ymer	4	7	7
Q	(Italy) S Travaglia	2	5
4	A Karatsev	6	7
7	(Estonia) M Lajal	6	6
Alt	(Italy) E Dalla Valle	3	4
Q	(Italy) J Berrettini	6	6
(Lithuania) E Butvilas	2	4
WC	(Italy) Lorenzo Carboni	3	6	3
Alt	(Spain) C Sánchez Jover	6	4	6
Alt	(France) Mathys Erhard	6^{6}	6	6
2	(Croatia) D Ajduković	7^{8}	4	3

Second round
Q	A Vatutin	3	5
(Monaco) V Vacherot	6	7
Alt	(Sweden) E Ymer	7	6
4	A Karatsev	5	0
7	(Estonia) M Lajal	7	7
Q	(Italy) J Berrettini	5	5
Alt	(Spain) C Sánchez Jover	6	6
Alt	(France) M Erhard	4	3

Quarterfinals
(Monaco) V Vacherot	4	6	6
Alt	(Sweden) E Ymer	6	3	2
7	(Estonia) M Lajal	6	6
Alt	(Spain) C Sánchez Jover	1	4

Semifinals
(Monaco) V Vacherot	1	6	6
7	(Estonia) M Lajal	6	3	1
