= 2026 Swiss Indoors – Doubles =

Doubles
- 2026 Swiss Indoors

Final
- Champions: (France) Théo Arribagé (France) Albano Olivetti
- Runners-up: (Switzerland) Henry Bernet (Switzerland) Dominic Stricker
- Score: 7–6^{(8–6)}, 7–6^{(8–6)}

Details
- Draw: 16
- Seeds: 4

Events
Singles	Doubles
- Swiss Indoors

Théo Arribagé and Albano Olivetti defeated Henry Bernet and Dominic Stricker in the final, 7–6^{(8–6)}, 7–6^{(8–6)} to win the doubles tennis title at the 2026 Swiss Indoors.

Marcel Granollers and Horacio Zeballos were the reigning champions, but did not participate this year.

== Seeds ==
1. (Germany) Kevin Krawietz / (Germany) Tim Pütz (semifinals)
2. (United Kingdom) Julian Cash / (United Kingdom) Lloyd Glasspool (quarterfinals)
3. (France) Théo Arribagé / (France) Albano Olivetti (champion)
4. (Portugal) Francisco Cabral / (United States) JJ Tracy (quarterfinals)

== Draw ==
Key

- Q = Qualifier
- WC = Wild card
- LL = Lucky loser
- Alt = Alternate
- ITF = ITF entry
- PR = Protected ranking
- SR = Special ranking
- SE = Special exempt
- JE = Junior exempt
- JR = Junior Accelerator Programme entrant
- CO = College Accelerator Programme entrant
- NG = Next Gen Accelerator Program entrant
- w/o = Walkover
- r = Retired
- d = Defaulted

=== Draw ===
First round
1	(Germany) K Krawietz (Germany) T Pütz	7^{7}	6
(Germany) J Schnaitter (Germany) M Wallner	6^{5}	3
(United States) R Galloway (Sweden) A Göransson	6	6^{4}	[6]
(Australia) M Polmans (Poland) J Zieliński	4	7^{7}	[10]
4	(Portugal) F Cabral (United States) JJ Tracy	6	4	[10]
Q	(France) A Reymond (France) L Sanchez	3	6	[7]
WC	(Switzerland) H Bernet (Switzerland) D Stricker	6	6
(France) S Doumbia (Netherlands) D Pel	4	4
WC	(Switzerland) J Paul (Czech Republic) M Vocel	5	1
(United States) A Michelsen (Netherlands) B van de Zandschulp	7	6
(Monaco) H Nys (France) É Roger-Vasselin	4	5
3	(France) T Arribagé (France) A Olivetti	6	7
(Argentina) M Navone (Chile) A Tabilo	3	5
(Germany) C Frantzen (Netherlands) R Haase	6	7
(Czech Republic) A Pavlásek (Czech Republic) P Rikl	5	6^{5}
2	(United Kingdom) J Cash (United Kingdom) L Glasspool	7	7^{7}

Quarterfinals
1	(Germany) K Krawietz (Germany) T Pütz	7^{7}	7^{7}
(Australia) M Polmans (Poland) J Zieliński	6^{3}	6^{5}
4	(Portugal) F Cabral (United States) JJ Tracy	6	6^{5}	[12]
WC	(Switzerland) H Bernet (Switzerland) D Stricker	2	7^{7}	[14]
(United States) A Michelsen (Netherlands) B van de Zandschulp	5	1
3	(France) T Arribagé (France) A Olivetti	7	6
(Germany) C Frantzen (Netherlands) R Haase	3	7^{8}	[10]
2	(United Kingdom) J Cash (United Kingdom) L Glasspool	6	6^{6}	[8]

Semifinals
1	(Germany) K Krawietz (Germany) T Pütz	4	4
WC	(Switzerland) H Bernet (Switzerland) D Stricker	6	6
3	(France) T Arribagé (France) A Olivetti	7^{7}	7^{7}
(Germany) C Frantzen (Netherlands) R Haase	6^{4}	6^{5}

Final
WC	(Switzerland) H Bernet (Switzerland) D Stricker	6^{6}	6^{6}
3	(France) T Arribagé (France) A Olivetti	7^{8}	7^{8}

== Qualifying ==
=== Seeds ===
1. (Belgium) Sander Gillé / (Netherlands) Sem Verbeek (first round)
2. (France) Arthur Reymond / (France) Luca Sanchez (qualified)

=== Qualifiers ===
1. (France) Arthur Reymond / (France) Luca Sanchez

=== Qualifying draw ===
First round
1	(Belgium) Sander Gillé (Netherlands) Sem Verbeek	6^{2}	7^{7}	[7]
Alt	(Monaco) Romain Arneodo (Germany) Hendrik Jebens	7^{7}	6^{5}	[10]
Alt	(Italy) Paolo Schiavone (Italy) Augusto Virgili	1	1
2	(France) Arthur Reymond (France) Luca Sanchez	6	6

Qualifying competition
Alt	(Monaco) Romain Arneodo (Germany) Hendrik Jebens	3	4
2	(France) Arthur Reymond (France) Luca Sanchez	6	6
