= 2025 Rolex Shanghai Masters – Doubles =

Doubles
- 2025 Rolex Shanghai Masters

Final
- Champions: (Germany) Kevin Krawietz (Germany) Tim Pütz
- Runners-up: (Sweden) André Göransson (United States) Alex Michelsen
- Score: 6–4, 6–4

Details
- Draw: 32 (3 WC)
- Seeds: 8

Events
Singles	Doubles
← 2024 ·	Shanghai Masters	· 2026 →

Kevin Krawietz and Tim Pütz defeated André Göransson and Alex Michelsen in the final, 6–4, 6–4 to win the doubles tennis title at the 2025 Shanghai Masters.

Wesley Koolhof and Nikola Mektić were the reigning champions, but Koolhof retired from professional tennis at the end of 2024. Mektić partnered Austin Krajicek, but lost to Marcelo Arévalo and Mate Pavić in the quarterfinals.

Lloyd Glasspool retained the ATP No. 1 doubles ranking after Arévalo and Pavić lost in the semifinals.

== Seeds ==
1. (El Salvador) Marcelo Arévalo / (Croatia) Mate Pavić (semifinals)
2. (Finland) Harri Heliövaara / (United Kingdom) Henry Patten (quarterfinals)
3. (Germany) Kevin Krawietz / (Germany) Tim Pütz (champions)
4. (Italy) Simone Bolelli / (Italy) Andrea Vavassori (first round)
5. (Monaco) Hugo Nys / (France) Édouard Roger-Vasselin (first round)
6. (United States) Christian Harrison / (United States) Evan King (second round)
7. (Argentina) Máximo González / (Argentina) Andrés Molteni (first round)
8. (Portugal) Francisco Cabral / (Austria) Lucas Miedler (first round)

== Draw ==
=== Key ===
- Q = Qualifier
- WC = Wild card
- LL = Lucky loser
- Alt = Alternate
- ITF = ITF entry
- PR = Protected ranking
- SR = Special ranking
- SE = Special exempt
- JE = Junior exempt
- JR = Junior Accelerator Programme entrant
- CO = College Accelerator Programme entrant
- NG = Next Gen Accelerator Program entrant
- w/o = Walkover
- r = Retired
- d = Defaulted

=== Finals ===
Semifinals
1	(El Salvador) Marcelo Arévalo (Croatia) Mate Pavić	6^{2}	6	[7]
(Sweden) André Göransson (United States) Alex Michelsen	7^{7}	2	[10]
3	(Germany) Kevin Krawietz (Germany) Tim Pütz	6	7^{10}
Alt	(Argentina) Guido Andreozzi (France) Manuel Guinard	3	6^{8}

Final
(Sweden) André Göransson (United States) Alex Michelsen	4	4
3	(Germany) Kevin Krawietz (Germany) Tim Pütz	6	6

=== Top half ===
First round
1	(El Salvador) M Arévalo (Croatia) M Pavić	6	7
Alt	(Uruguay) A Behar (Brazil) R Matos	4	5
(United Kingdom) N Skupski (Australia) J-P Smith	6	7^{7}
(Canada) F Auger-Aliassime (Netherlands) R Haase	4	6^{5}
(United States) A Krajicek (Croatia) N Mektić	7	6
(Austria) A Erler (United States) R Galloway	5	4
(Canada) G Diallo (United States) B Nakashima	4	2
6	(United States) C Harrison (United States) E King	6	6
4	(Italy) S Bolelli (Italy) A Vavassori	3	5
(Australia) J Peers (Poland) J Zieliński	6	7
(Monaco) R Arneodo (Belgium) Z Bergs	6^{1}	3
Alt	(Germany) J Schnaitter (Germany) M Wallner	7^{7}	6
(Czech Republic) A Pavlásek (Brazil) F Romboli	6^{4}	6	[11]
K Khachanov; A Rublev	7^{7}	2	[13]
(Sweden) A Göransson (United States) A Michelsen	6	7^{8}
8	(Portugal) F Cabral (Austria) L Miedler	2	6^{6}

Second round
1	(El Salvador) M Arévalo (Croatia) M Pavić	6	6
(United Kingdom) N Skupski (Australia) J-P Smith	3	2
(United States) A Krajicek (Croatia) N Mektić	6^{7}	6	[10]
6	(United States) C Harrison (United States) E King	7^{9}	3	[4]
(Australia) J Peers (Poland) J Zieliński	7^{7}	6^{3}	[2]
Alt	(Germany) J Schnaitter (Germany) M Wallner	6^{5}	7^{7}	[10]
K Khachanov; A Rublev
(Sweden) A Göransson (United States) A Michelsen	w/o

Quarterfinals
1	(El Salvador) M Arévalo (Croatia) M Pavić	3	6	[10]
(United States) A Krajicek (Croatia) N Mektić	6	4	[3]
Alt	(Germany) J Schnaitter (Germany) M Wallner	1	6	[6]
(Sweden) A Göransson (United States) A Michelsen	6	3	[10]

Semifinals
1	(El Salvador) M Arévalo (Croatia) M Pavić	6^{2}	6	[7]
(Sweden) A Göransson (United States) A Michelsen	7^{7}	2	[10]

=== Bottom half ===
First round
7	(Argentina) M González (Argentina) A Molteni	4	3
(Mexico) S González (Netherlands) D Pel	6	6
WC	(China) J Shang (China) Z Zhang	3	3
(France) C Moutet (France) A Müller	6	6
(United States) R Cash (United States) JJ Tracy	7^{7}	6
WC	(India) R Bopanna (Netherlands) J-J Rojer	6^{5}	2
(France) S Doumbia (France) F Reboul	4	3
3	(Germany) K Krawietz (Germany) T Pütz	6	6
5	(Monaco) H Nys (France) É Roger-Vasselin	2	6^{4}
Alt	(Argentina) G Andreozzi (France) M Guinard	6	7^{7}
(Argentina) F Cerúndolo (Italy) L Darderi	6	7^{7}
Alt	(Australia) MC Romios (United States) R Seggerman	3	6^{2}
(Brazil) M Melo (Germany) A Zverev	6^{3}	6	[5]
WC	(China) Y Bu (Chinese Taipei) R Ho	7^{7}	4	[10]
(Netherlands) S Arends (United Kingdom) L Johnson	7^{7}	4	[4]
2	(Finland) H Heliövaara (United Kingdom) H Patten	6^{2}	6	[10]

Second round
(Mexico) S González (Netherlands) D Pel	7^{7}	6
(France) C Moutet (France) A Müller	6^{5}	4
(United States) R Cash (United States) JJ Tracy	1	2
3	(Germany) K Krawietz (Germany) T Pütz	6	6
Alt	(Argentina) G Andreozzi (France) M Guinard	6^{5}	6	[10]
(Argentina) F Cerúndolo (Italy) L Darderi	7^{7}	3	[4]
WC	(China) Y Bu (Chinese Taipei) R Ho	7^{7}	6^{4}	[8]
2	(Finland) H Heliövaara (United Kingdom) H Patten	6^{3}	7^{7}	[10]

Quarterfinals
(Mexico) S González (Netherlands) D Pel	7^{7}	5	[4]
3	(Germany) K Krawietz (Germany) T Pütz	6^{4}	7	[10]
Alt	(Argentina) G Andreozzi (France) M Guinard	2	6	[12]
2	(Finland) H Heliövaara (United Kingdom) H Patten	6	4	[10]

Semifinals
3	(Germany) K Krawietz (Germany) T Pütz	6	7^{10}
Alt	(Argentina) G Andreozzi (France) M Guinard	3	6^{8}

== Seeded teams ==
The following are the seeded teams. Seedings are based on ATP rankings as of 29 September 2025.

Country	Player	Country	Player	Rank^{1}	Seed
ESA	Marcelo Arévalo	CRO	Mate Pavić	6	1
FIN	Harri Heliövaara	GBR	Henry Patten	14	2
GER	Kevin Krawietz	GER	Tim Pütz	25	3
ITA	Simone Bolelli	ITA	Andrea Vavassori	29	4
MON	Hugo Nys	FRA	Édouard Roger-Vasselin	35	5
USA	Christian Harrison	USA	Evan King	35	6
ARG	Máximo González	ARG	Andrés Molteni	42	7
POR	Francisco Cabral	AUT	Lucas Miedler	51	8

== Other entrants ==
=== Wildcards ===
- (India) Rohan Bopanna / (Netherlands) Jean-Julien Rojer
- (China) Bu Yunchaokete / (Chinese Taipei) Ray Ho
- (China) Shang Juncheng / (China) Zhang Zhizhen

=== Alternates ===
- ~~(Germany) Daniel Altmaier / (Argentina) Camilo Ugo Carabelli~~
- (Argentina) Guido Andreozzi / (France) Manuel Guinard
- (Uruguay) Ariel Behar / (Brazil) Rafael Matos
- (Australia) Matthew Romios / (United States) Ryan Seggerman
- (Germany) Jakob Schnaitter / (Germany) Mark Wallner

=== Withdrawals ===
- (Germany) Daniel Altmaier / (Argentina) Camilo Ugo Carabelli → replaced by (Uruguay) Ariel Behar / (Brazil) Rafael Matos
- (Kazakhstan) Alexander Bublik / (United States) Ben Shelton → replaced by (Germany) Jakob Schnaitter / (Germany) Mark Wallner
- (Australia) Alex de Minaur / (Australia) Rinky Hijikata → replaced by (Australia) Matthew Romios / (United States) Ryan Seggerman
