= 2025 Monte-Carlo Masters – Singles =

Tennis tournament event

Singles
- 2025 Monte-Carlo Masters

Final
- Champion: (Spain) Carlos Alcaraz
- Runner-up: (Italy) Lorenzo Musetti
- Score: 3–6, 6–1, 6–0

Details
- Draw: 56 (7 Q / 4 WC)
- Seeds: 16

Events
Singles	Doubles
- Monte-Carlo Masters

Carlos Alcaraz defeated Lorenzo Musetti in the final, 3–6, 6–1, 6–0 to win the men's singles tennis title at the 2025 Monte-Carlo Masters. It was his sixth ATP 1000 title and 18th career ATP Tour title.

Stefanos Tsitsipas was the defending champion, but lost to Musetti in the quarterfinals. Valentin Vacherot was the first Monégasque player to win a main-draw match at the tournament since Jean-René Lisnard in 2009.

== Seeds ==
The top eight seeds received a bye into the second round.

1. (Germany) Alexander Zverev (second round)
2. (Spain) Carlos Alcaraz (champion)
3. (Serbia) Novak Djokovic (second round)
4. (Norway) Casper Ruud (third round)
5. (United Kingdom) Jack Draper (third round)
6. (Greece) Stefanos Tsitsipas (quarterfinals)
7. Andrey Rublev (third round)
8. (Australia) Alex de Minaur (semifinals)
9. Daniil Medvedev (third round)
10. (Denmark) Holger Rune (first round, retired)
11. (United States) Ben Shelton (first round)
12. (France) Arthur Fils (quarterfinals)
13. (Italy) Lorenzo Musetti (final)
14. (United States) Frances Tiafoe (second round)
15. (Bulgaria) Grigor Dimitrov (quarterfinals)
16. (Canada) Félix Auger-Aliassime (first round)

Click on the seed number of a player to go to their draw section.

== Draw ==
Key

- Q = Qualifier
- WC = Wild card
- LL = Lucky loser
- Alt = Alternate
- ITF = ITF entry
- PR = Protected ranking
- SR = Special ranking
- SE = Special exempt
- JE = Junior exempt
- JR = Junior Accelerator Programme entrant
- CO = College Accelerator Programme entrant
- NG = Next Gen Accelerator Program entrant
- w/o = Walkover
- r = Retired
- d = Defaulted

=== Finals ===
Quarterfinals
13	(Italy) Lorenzo Musetti	1	6	6
6	(Greece) Stefanos Tsitsipas	6	3	4
15	(Bulgaria) Grigor Dimitrov	0	0
8	(Australia) Alex de Minaur	6	6
(Spain) Alejandro Davidovich Fokina	6	6
(Australia) Alexei Popyrin	3	2
12	(France) Arthur Fils	6	5	3
2	(Spain) Carlos Alcaraz	4	7	6

Semifinals
13	(Italy) Lorenzo Musetti	1	6	7^{7}
8	(Australia) Alex de Minaur	6	4	6^{4}
(Spain) Alejandro Davidovich Fokina	6^{2}	4
2	(Spain) Carlos Alcaraz	7^{7}	6

Final
13	(Italy) Lorenzo Musetti	6	1	0
2	(Spain) Carlos Alcaraz	3	6	6

=== Top half ===
==== Section 1 ====
First round
Q	(Argentina) M Navone	4	4
(Italy) M Berrettini	6	6
(Czech Republic) J Lehečka	6	7^{9}
(United States) S Korda	3	6^{7}
Q	(China) Y Bu	6	5	3
13	(Italy) L Musetti	4	7	6
10	(Denmark) H Rune	2	0^{r}
(Portugal) N Borges	6	3
(Italy) L Sonego	4	6	2
(Spain) P Martínez	6	1	6
(Australia) J Thompson	6	6
(France) G Mpetshi Perricard	4	3

Second round
1	(Germany) A Zverev	6	3	5
(Italy) M Berrettini	2	6	7
(Czech Republic) J Lehečka	6	5	2
13	(Italy) L Musetti	1	7	6
(Portugal) N Borges	7	6^{4}	6
(Spain) P Martínez	5	7^{7}	4
(Australia) J Thompson	6	4	2
6	(Greece) S Tsitsipas	4	6	6

Third round
(Italy) M Berrettini	3	3
13	(Italy) L Musetti	6	6
(Portugal) N Borges	1	1
6	(Greece) S Tsitsipas	6	6

Quarterfinals
13	(Italy) L Musetti	1	6	6
6	(Greece) S Tsitsipas	6	3	4

==== Section 2 ====
First round
WC	(Switzerland) S Wawrinka	6	5	5
(Chile) A Tabilo	1	7	7
(Germany) J-L Struff	2	1
WC	(Monaco) V Vacherot	6	6
(Chile) N Jarry	3	4
15	(Bulgaria) G Dimitrov	6	6
9	D Medvedev	7	4	6
K Khachanov	5	6	4
(France) A Müller	6	6
Q	(Argentina) C Ugo Carabelli	4	4
(Czech Republic) T Macháč	3	6	6
(Argentina) S Báez	6	3	2

Second round
3	(Serbia) N Djokovic	3	4
(Chile) A Tabilo	6	6
WC	(Monaco) V Vacherot	6	3	1
15	(Bulgaria) G Dimitrov	4	6	6
9	D Medvedev	7^{8}	5	6
(France) A Müller	6^{6}	7	2
(Czech Republic) T Macháč	6	0	3
8	(Australia) A de Minaur	3	6	6

Third round
(Chile) A Tabilo	3	6	2
15	(Bulgaria) G Dimitrov	6	3	6
9	D Medvedev	2	2
8	(Australia) A de Minaur	6	6

Quarterfinals
15	(Bulgaria) G Dimitrov	0	0
8	(Australia) A de Minaur	6	6

=== Bottom half ===
==== Section 3 ====
First round
(United States) M Giron	6	7^{7}
(Canada) D Shapovalov	3	6^{5}
(Argentina) TM Etcheverry	4	6	6
Q	(France) C Moutet	6	1	4
(Spain) A Davidovich Fokina	6^{2}	6	6
11	(United States) B Shelton	7^{7}	2	1
14	(United States) F Tiafoe	6	5	7^{7}
(Serbia) M Kecmanović	2	7	6^{5}
(Australia) A Popyrin	3	7^{7}	6
(France) U Humbert	6	6^{2}	4
(Spain) R Bautista Agut	6	6
(United States) B Nakashima	2	4

Second round
5	(United Kingdom) J Draper	6	6
(United States) M Giron	1	1
(Argentina) TM Etcheverry	6^{2}	3
(Spain) A Davidovich Fokina	7^{7}	6
14	(United States) F Tiafoe	6	3	3
(Australia) A Popyrin	3	6	6
(Spain) R Bautista Agut	2	1
4	(Norway) C Ruud	6	6

Third round
5	(United Kingdom) J Draper	3	7^{8}	4
(Spain) A Davidovich Fokina	6	6^{6}	6
(Australia) A Popyrin	6	3	7
4	(Norway) C Ruud	4	6	5

Quarterfinals
(Spain) A Davidovich Fokina	6	6
(Australia) A Popyrin	3	2

==== Section 4 ====
First round
(France) G Monfils	4	6	6
Q	(Hungary) F Marozsán	6	1	1
Q	(Serbia) D Lajović	4	2
(Italy) F Cobolli	6	6
(Netherlands) T Griekspoor	7^{7}	4	2
12	(France) A Fils	6^{3}	6	6
16	(Canada) F Auger-Aliassime	6^{5}	3
Q	(Germany) D Altmaier	7^{7}	6
(Italy) M Arnaldi	3	6	4
WC	(France) R Gasquet	6	4	6
WC	(Italy) F Fognini	0	3
(Argentina) F Cerúndolo	6	6

Second round
7	A Rublev	6	7^{7}
(France) G Monfils	4	6^{2}
(Italy) F Cobolli	2	4
12	(France) A Fils	6	6
Q	(Germany) D Altmaier	7	5	6
WC	(France) R Gasquet	5	7	2
(Argentina) F Cerúndolo	6	0	1
2	(Spain) C Alcaraz	3	6	6

Third round
7	A Rublev	2	3
12	(France) A Fils	6	6
Q	(Germany) D Altmaier	3	1
2	(Spain) C Alcaraz	6	6

Quarterfinals
12	(France) A Fils	6	5	3
2	(Spain) C Alcaraz	4	7	6

== Qualifying ==
=== Seeds ===
1. (Belgium) Zizou Bergs (first round)
2. (Belgium) David Goffin (qualifying competition)
3. (Spain) Jaume Munar (first round)
4. (Argentina) Mariano Navone (qualified)
5. (France) Benjamin Bonzi (first round)
6. (Argentina) Camilo Ugo Carabelli (qualified)
7. (Argentina) Francisco Comesaña (first round)
8. (China) Bu Yunchaokete (qualified)
9. (Italy) Mattia Bellucci (qualifying competition)
10. (Serbia) Hamad Medjedovic (qualifying competition)
11. (France) Arthur Rinderknech (qualifying competition)
12. (France) Corentin Moutet (qualified)
13. (Australia) Aleksandar Vukic (first round)
14. (Kazakhstan) Alexander Bublik (first round)

=== Qualifiers ===
1. (Hungary) Fábián Marozsán
2. (France) Corentin Moutet
3. (Germany) Daniel Altmaier
4. (Argentina) Mariano Navone
5. (China) Bu Yunchaokete
6. (Argentina) Camilo Ugo Carabelli
7. (Serbia) Dušan Lajović

=== Qualifying draw ===
==== First qualifier ====
First round
1	(Belgium) Zizou Bergs	2	6^{5}
(Hungary) Fábián Marozsán	6	7^{7}
(United Kingdom) Cameron Norrie	4	6	3
9	(Italy) Mattia Bellucci	6	2	6

Qualifying competition
(Hungary) Fábián Marozsán	6	6
9	(Italy) Mattia Bellucci	1	2

==== Second qualifier ====
First round
2	(Belgium) David Goffin	7	4	6
Alt	(Germany) Yannick Hanfmann	5	6	4
(Canada) Gabriel Diallo	7	4	4
12	(France) Corentin Moutet	5	6	6

Qualifying competition
2	(Belgium) David Goffin	6	6^{4}	5
12	(France) Corentin Moutet	2	7^{7}	7

==== Third qualifier ====
First round
3	(Spain) Jaume Munar	5	6	5
(Germany) Daniel Altmaier	7	3	7
WC	(France) Pierre-Hugues Herbert	4	6	6
13	(Australia) Aleksandar Vukic	6	2	3

Qualifying competition
(Germany) Daniel Altmaier	7^{7}	6
WC	(France) Pierre-Hugues Herbert	6^{3}	3

==== Fourth qualifier ====
First round
4	(Argentina) Mariano Navone	6	6
Alt	(Chinese Taipei) Chun-hsin Tseng	3	1
(Italy) Luca Nardi	4	4
11	(France) Arthur Rinderknech	6	6

Qualifying competition
4	(Argentina) Mariano Navone	6	6^{5}	6
11	(France) Arthur Rinderknech	0	7^{7}	1

==== Fifth qualifier ====
First round
5	(France) Benjamin Bonzi	4	6	3
WC	(Spain) Albert Ramos Viñolas	6	0	6
WC	(Norway) Nicolai Budkov Kjær	3	1
8	(China) Bu Yunchaokete	6	6

Qualifying competition
WC	(Spain) Albert Ramos Viñolas	4	4
8	(China) Bu Yunchaokete	6	6

==== Sixth qualifier ====
First round
6	(Argentina) Camilo Ugo Carabelli	6	6
Alt	(France) Hugo Gaston	4	0
Alt/PR	(Croatia) Borna Gojo	4	4
10	(Serbia) Hamad Medjedovic	6	6

Qualifying competition
6	(Argentina) Camilo Ugo Carabelli	7	6
10	(Serbia) Hamad Medjedovic	5	4

==== Seventh qualifier ====
First round
7	(Argentina) Francisco Comesaña	4	4
(Serbia) Laslo Djere	6	6
WC	(Serbia) Dušan Lajović	6	6^{5}	6
14	(Kazakhstan) Alexander Bublik	2	7^{7}	0

Qualifying competition
(Serbia) Laslo Djere	4	2
WC	(Serbia) Dušan Lajović	6	6
