= 2026 Davis Cup World Group I play-offs =

Tennis tournament

The 2026 Davis Cup World Group I play-offswere held from 6 to 8 February 2026. The thirteen winners of this round qualified for the 2026 Davis Cup World Group I while the thirteen losers competed at the 2026 Davis Cup World Group II.

== Teams ==
Twenty-six teams will play for thirteen spots in the World Group I, in series decided on a home and away basis.

These twenty-six teams are:

- 13 losing teams from 2025 World Group I
- 13 winning teams from 2025 World Group II

The 13 winning teams from the play-offs will qualify for the World Group I and the 13 losing teams will play at the World Group II.

#: Nations Ranking as of 15 September 2025.

Seeded teams

1. Finland (#17)
2. Switzerland (#25)
3. Portugal (#27)
4. Chinese Taipei (#28)
5. Bosnia and Herzegovina (#30)
6. Kazakhstan (#31)
7. Israel (#32)
8. Turkey (#35)
9. Poland (#36)
10. Colombia (#38)
11. Greece (#39)
12. Romania (#40)
13. Ukraine (#41)

Unseeded teams

- Egypt (#42)
- Luxembourg (#43)
- Monaco (#44)
- Lithuania (#45)
- Morocco (#46)
- Mexico (#47)
- New Zealand (#48)
- Lebanon (=#51)
- Tunisia (=#51)
- Hong Kong (=#53)
- China (#59)
- Slovenia (#64)
- Paraguay (#65)

== Results summary ==
Home team	Score	Away team	Location	Venue	Surface
Hong Kong	1–3	Finland [1]	Hong Kong	Victoria Park Tennis Stadium	Hard
Switzerland [2]	4–0	Tunisia	Biel/Bienne	Swiss Tennis Arena	Hard (i)
China	3–1	Portugal [3]	Guangzhou	Nansha International Tennis Center	Hard
Chinese Taipei [4]	3–1	Lebanon	Taipei	Taipei Tennis Center	Hard
New Zealand	3–2	Bosnia and Herzegovina [5]	Whangārei	McKay Stadium	Hard
Kazakhstan [6]	1–3	Monaco	Astana	Beeline Arena	Hard (i)
Israel [7]	1–3	Lithuania	Netanya	Netanya Arena	Hard
Slovenia	1–3	Turkey [8]	Velenje	Bela dvorana Velenje	Clay (i)
Egypt	0–4	Poland [9]	Cairo	Gezira Sporting Club	Clay
Morocco	1–3	Colombia [10]	Casablanca	Union Sportive Marocaine Tennis Club	Clay
Greece [11]	3–1	Mexico	Athens	Faliro Sports Pavilion Arena	Hard (i)
Paraguay	3–1	Romania [12]	Asunción	Club Internacional de Tenis	Clay
Luxembourg	3–1	Ukraine [13]	Luxembourg	Coque - Centre National Sportif et Culturel	Hard (i)

== Results ==
=== Hong Kong vs. Finland ===
Hong Kong
1
Victoria Park Tennis Stadium, Hong Kong
7–8 February 2026
Hard

Finland
3

			1	2	3
1	(Hong Kong) (Finland)	Siu Chi Nicholas Cheng; Otto Virtanen	0; 6	1; 6
2	(Hong Kong) (Finland)	Coleman Wong; Eero Vasa	6; 4	6; 2
3	(Hong Kong) (Finland)	Siu Chi Nicholas Cheng / Coleman Wong; Patrik Niklas-Salminen / Otto Virtanen	4; 6	5; 7
4	(Hong Kong) (Finland)	Coleman Wong; Otto Virtanen	5; 7	2; 6
5	(Hong Kong) (Finland)	Siu Chi Nicholas Cheng; Eero Vasa				not played

=== Switzerland vs. Tunisia ===
Switzerland
4
Swiss Tennis Arena, Biel/Bienne, Switzerland
6–7 February 2026
Hard (i)

Tunisia
0

			1	2	3
1	(Switzerland) (Tunisia)	Jérôme Kym; Moez Echargui	7^{7} 6^{2}	6; 4
2	(Switzerland) (Tunisia)	Leandro Riedi; Alaa Trifi	6; 1	6; 0
3	(Switzerland) (Tunisia)	Jakub Paul / Dominic Stricker; Moez Echargui / Skander Mansouri	6; 4	7^{7} 6^{3}
4	(Switzerland) (Tunisia)	Mika Brunold; Aziz Ouakaa	6; 2	6; 2
5	(Switzerland) (Tunisia)	Jérôme Kym; Alaa Trifi				not played

=== China vs. Portugal ===
China
3
Nansha International Tennis Center, Guangzhou, China
6–7 February 2026
Hard

Portugal
1

			1	2	3
1	(China) (Portugal)	Bu Yunchaokete; Henrique Rocha	4; 6	4; 6
2	(China) (Portugal)	Wu Yibing; Nuno Borges	6; 1	7^{7} 6^{3}
3	(China) (Portugal)	Zhang Zhizhen / Zhou Yi; Nuno Borges / Francisco Cabral	6; 4	3; 6	6; 4
4	(China) (Portugal)	Zhang Zhizhen; Nuno Borges	7; 5	6; 4
5	(China) (Portugal)	Wu Yibing; Henrique Rocha				not played

=== Chinese Taipei vs. Lebanon ===
Chinese Taipei
3
Taipei Tennis Center, Taipei, Chinese Taipei
7–8 February 2026
Hard

Lebanon
1

			1	2	3
1	(Chinese Taipei) (Lebanon)	Wu Tung-lin; Hady Habib	6; 3	6; 2
2	(Chinese Taipei) (Lebanon)	Huang Tsung-hao; Benjamin Hassan	4; 6	4; 6
3	(Chinese Taipei) (Lebanon)	Hsieh Cheng-peng / Huang Tsung-hao; Benjamin Hassan / Hasan Ibrahim	7^{8} 6^{6}	6; 3
4	(Chinese Taipei) (Lebanon)	Wu Tung-lin; Benjamin Hassan	6; 3	6; 4
5	(Chinese Taipei) (Lebanon)	Huang Tsung-hao; Hady Habib				not played

=== New Zealand vs. Bosnia and Herzegovina ===
New Zealand
3
McKay Stadium, Whangārei, New Zealand
7–8 February 2026
Hard

Bosnia and Herzegovina
2

			1	2	3
1	(New Zealand) (Bosnia and Herzegovina)	Anton Shepp; Andrej Nedić	4; 6	6; 4	5; 7
2	(New Zealand) (Bosnia and Herzegovina)	James Watt; Mirza Bašić	2; 6	6^{5} 7^{7}
3	(New Zealand) (Bosnia and Herzegovina)	Ajeet Rai / Finn Reynolds; Tomislav Brkić / Vladan Tadić	6; 2	6; 1
4	(New Zealand) (Bosnia and Herzegovina)	James Watt; Andrej Nedić	6; 3	7^{7} 6^{4}
5	(New Zealand) (Bosnia and Herzegovina)	Anton Shepp; Mirza Bašić	6; 2	6; 4

=== Kazakhstan vs. Monaco ===
Kazakhstan
1
Beeline Arena, Astana, Kazakhstan
6–7 February 2026
Hard (i)

Monaco
3

			1	2	3
1	(Kazakhstan) (Monaco)	Alexander Bublik; Hugo Nys	6; 0	6; 3
2	(Kazakhstan) (Monaco)	Alexander Shevchenko; Valentin Vacherot	0; 6	3; 6
3	(Kazakhstan) (Monaco)	Alexander Bublik / Beibit Zhukayev; Romain Arneodo / Hugo Nys	7^{7} 6^{1}	6^{6} 7^{8}	6^{5} 7^{7}
4	(Kazakhstan) (Monaco)	Alexander Bublik; Valentin Vacherot	6^{4} 7^{7}	6^{7} 7^{9}
5	(Kazakhstan) (Monaco)	Alexander Shevchenko; Hugo Nys				not played

=== Israel vs. Lithuania ===
Israel
1
Netanya Arena, Netanya, Israel
6–7 February 2026
Hard

Lithuania
3

			1	2	3
1	(Israel) (Lithuania)	Amit Vales; Edas Butvilas	6^{3} 7^{7}	0; 6
2	(Israel) (Lithuania)	Ofek Shimanov; Vilius Gaubas	0; 6	4; 6
3	(Israel) (Lithuania)	Daniel Cukierman / Ofek Shimanov; Edas Butvilas / Vilius Gaubas	7^{11} 6^{9}	6; 3
4	(Israel) (Lithuania)	Amit Vales; Vilius Gaubas	1; 6	6; 3	2; 6
5	(Israel) (Lithuania)	Ofek Shimanov; Edas Butvilas				not played

=== Slovenia vs. Turkey ===
Slovenia
1
Bela dvorana Velenje, Velenje, Slovenia
6–7 February 2026
Clay (i)

Turkey
3

			1	2	3
1	(Slovenia) (Turkey)	Sebastian Dominko; Mert Alkaya	5; 7	6^{4} 7^{7}
2	(Slovenia) (Turkey)	Bor Artnak; Yankı Erel	6^{2} 7^{7}	1; 6
3	(Slovenia) (Turkey)	Filip Jeff Planinšek / Žiga Šeško; Yankı Erel / Ergi Kırkın	6^{3} 7^{7}	3; 6
4	(Slovenia) (Turkey)	Filip Jeff Planinšek; Kaan Işık Koşaner	6^{4} 7^{7}	6; 1	10; 4
5	(Slovenia) (Turkey)	Sebastian Dominko; Yankı Erel				not played

=== Egypt vs. Poland ===
Egypt
0
Gezira Sporting Club, Cairo, Egypt
7–8 February 2026
Clay

Poland
4

			1	2	3
1	(Egypt) (Poland)	Fares Zakaria; Karol Filar	2; 6	0; 6
2	(Egypt) (Poland)	Michael Bassem Sobhy; Maks Kaśnikowski	1; 6	6^{7} 7^{9}
3	(Egypt) (Poland)	Michael Bassem Sobhy / Fares Zakaria; Karol Drzewiecki / Jan Zieliński	6^{4} 7^{7}	4; 6
4	(Egypt) (Poland)	Karim Ibrahim; Filip Pieczonka	5; 7	2; 6
5	(Egypt) (Poland)	Michael Bassem Sobhy; Karol Filar				not played

=== Morocco vs. Colombia ===
Morocco
1
Union Sportive Marocaine Tennis Club, Casablanca, Morocco
7–8 February 2026
Clay

Colombia
3

			1	2	3
1	(Morocco) (Colombia)	Reda Bennani; Adrià Soriano Barrera	7^{7} 6^{4}	7; 5
2	(Morocco) (Colombia)	Taha Baadi; Nicolás Mejía	3; 6	2; 6
3	(Morocco) (Colombia)	Karim Bennani / Younes Lalami; Nicolás Barrientos / Juan Sebastián Gómez	6^{5} 7^{7}	6^{6} 7^{8}
4	(Morocco) (Colombia)	Reda Bennani; Nicolás Mejía	1; 6	6; 4	2; 6
5	(Morocco) (Colombia)	Taha Baadi; Adrià Soriano Barrera				not played

=== Greece vs. Mexico ===
Greece
3
Faliro Sports Pavilion Arena, Athens, Greece
7–8 February 2026
Hard (i)

Mexico
1

			1	2	3
1	(Greece) (Mexico)	Stefanos Sakellaridis; Rodrigo Pacheco Méndez	2; 6	6; 4	3; 6
2	(Greece) (Mexico)	Stefanos Tsitsipas; Alan Magadán	6; 3	7^{7} 6^{1}
3	(Greece) (Mexico)	Stefanos Sakellaridis / Stefanos Tsitsipas; Alan Magadán / Rodrigo Pacheco Méndez	6; 3	6; 4
4	(Greece) (Mexico)	Stefanos Tsitsipas; Rodrigo Pacheco Méndez	6; 1	7; 5
5	(Greece) (Mexico)	Stefanos Sakellaridis; Alan Magadán				not played

=== Paraguay vs. Romania ===
Paraguay
3
Club Internacional de Tenis, Asunción, Paraguay
6–7 February 2026
Clay

Romania
1

			1	2	3
1	(Paraguay) (Romania)	Alex Santino Nuñez Vera; Radu David Țurcanu	1; 6	6; 3	6^{2} 7^{7}
2	(Paraguay) (Romania)	Daniel Vallejo; Gabriel Ghetu	6; 1	6; 4
3	(Paraguay) (Romania)	Daniel Vallejo / Martin Vergara del Puerto; Mircea-Alexandru Jecan / Bogdan Pavel	6; 3	7; 5
4	(Paraguay) (Romania)	Daniel Vallejo; Ștefan Paloși	6; 1	6; 2
5	(Paraguay) (Romania)	Alex Santino Nuñez Vera; Gabriel Ghetu				not played

=== Luxembourg vs. Ukraine ===
Luxembourg
3
Coque - Centre National Sportif et Culturel, Luxembourg
7–8 February 2026
Hard (i)

Ukraine
1

			1	2	3
1	(Luxembourg) (Ukraine)	Chris Rodesch; Oleksii Krutykh	6; 3	6; 1
2	(Luxembourg) (Ukraine)	Alex Knaff; Vladyslav Orlov	7^{7} 6^{2}	6; 2
3	(Luxembourg) (Ukraine)	Alex Knaff / Chris Rodesch; Vladyslav Orlov / Oleksandr Ovcharenko	6; 4	6; 2
4	(Luxembourg) (Ukraine)	Raphaël Calzi; Oleksandr Ovcharenko	4; 6	4; 6
5	(Luxembourg) (Ukraine)	Alex Knaff; Oleksii Krutykh				not played
