= 2022 Tiburon Challenger – Doubles =

Doubles
- 2022 Tiburon Challenger

Final
- Champions: (Switzerland) Leandro Riedi (Monaco) Valentin Vacherot
- Runners-up: (United States) Ezekiel Clark (United States) Alfredo Perez
- Score: 6–7^{(2–7)}, 6–3, [10–2]

Events
Singles	Doubles
- Tiburon Challenger

Robert Galloway and Roberto Maytín were the defending champions but chose not to defend their title.

Leandro Riedi and Valentin Vacherot won the title after defeating Ezekiel Clark and Alfredo Perez 6–7^{(2–7)}, 6–3, [10–2] in the final.

== Seeds ==
1. (United Kingdom) Julian Cash / (United Kingdom) Henry Patten (quarterfinals)
2. (Australia) Andrew Harris / (Australia) Luke Saville (quarterfinals)
3. (Tunisia) Malek Jaziri / (Greece) Michail Pervolarakis (first round)
4. (Zimbabwe) Benjamin Lock / (Zimbabwe) Courtney John Lock (first round)

== Draw ==
Key

- Q = Qualifier
- WC = Wild card
- LL = Lucky loser
- Alt = Alternate
- ITF = ITF entry
- PR = Protected ranking
- SR = Special ranking
- SE = Special exempt
- JE = Junior exempt
- JR = Junior Accelerator Programme entrant
- CO = College Accelerator Programme entrant
- NG = Next Gen Accelerator Program entrant
- w/o = Walkover
- r = Retired
- d = Defaulted

First round
1	(United Kingdom) J Cash (United Kingdom) H Patten	6	6
(Germany) S Fanselow (United States) E Zhu	1	3
(Switzerland) L Riedi (Monaco) V Vacherot	6	7^{7}
(United States) N Chappell (United States) R Stalder	4	6^{4}
3	(Tunisia) M Jaziri (Greece) M Pervolarakis	6^{5}	5
(India) A Chandrasekar (India) VS Prashanth	7^{7}	7
WC	(India) S Banthia (Denmark) CE Overbeck	5	7^{7}	[11]
(United States) D Kudla (United States) B Shelton	7	6^{4}	[9]
(United States) E Escobedo (Colombia) N Mejía	6	4	[10]
(United States) E King (United States) M Krueger	3	6	[8]
WC	(United States) Ezekiel Clark (United States) A Perez	6	6
4	(Zimbabwe) B Lock (Zimbabwe) CJ Lock	1	1
(Canada) A Galarneau (Italy) G Oradini	6^{4}	3
(United Kingdom) C Broom (Germany) C Frantzen	7^{7}	6
(Spain) C Gómez-Herrera (Ecuador) R Quiroz	1	6^{4}
2	(Australia) A Harris (Australia) L Saville	6	7^{7}

Quarterfinals
1	(United Kingdom) J Cash (United Kingdom) H Patten	6^{5}	3
(Switzerland) L Riedi (Monaco) V Vacherot	7^{7}	6
(India) A Chandrasekar (India) VS Prashanth	3	5
WC	(India) S Banthia (Denmark) CE Overbeck	6	7
(United States) E Escobedo (Colombia) N Mejía	3	6	[7]
WC	(United States) E Clark (United States) A Perez	6	2	[10]
(United Kingdom) C Broom (Germany) C Frantzen	6	6^{8}	[10]
2	(Australia) A Harris (Australia) L Saville	3	7^{10}	[7]

Semifinals
(Switzerland) L Riedi (Monaco) V Vacherot	6	6
WC	(India) S Banthia (Denmark) CE Overbeck	4	3
WC	(United States) E Clark (United States) A Perez	6	6
(United Kingdom) C Broom (Germany) C Frantzen	1	4

Final
(Switzerland) L Riedi (Monaco) V Vacherot	6^{2}	6	[10]
WC	(United States) E Clark (United States) A Perez	7^{7}	3	[2]
