= 2026 Monte-Carlo Masters – Singles =

Tennis tournament event

Singles
- 2026 Monte-Carlo Masters

Final
- Champion: (Italy) Jannik Sinner
- Runner-up: (Spain) Carlos Alcaraz
- Score: 7–6^{(7–5)}, 6–3

Details
- Draw: 56 (7 Q / 4 WC)
- Seeds: 16

Events
Singles	Doubles
- Monte-Carlo Masters

Jannik Sinner defeated defending champion Carlos Alcaraz in the final, 7–6^{(7–5)}, 6–3 to win the singles tennis title at the 2026 Monte-Carlo Masters. It was his eighth ATP Masters 1000 title, and first title on clay courts since 2022. By winning the title, Sinner regained the world No. 1 singles ranking from Alcaraz. He was the third man (after Novak Djokovic and Rafael Nadal) to win four consecutive ATP Masters 1000 titles, and the first to win the first three ATP Masters 1000 events of the season since Djokovic in 2015.

Sinner's record of 37 consecutive sets won at ATP Masters 1000 events ended in the third round when Tomáš Macháč won the second set.

Valentin Vacherot became the first Monégasque singles player in the Open Era to reach the quarterfinals and semifinals of the Monte-Carlo Masters, and the first to reach the top 20 in the ATP singles rankings. Félix Auger-Aliassime became the third player born in the 2000s to reach at least the quarterfinals at all nine ATP Masters 1000 events (after Alcaraz and Sinner), and became the first Canadian player to do so.

== Seeds ==
The top eight seeds received a bye into the second round.

1. (Spain) Carlos Alcaraz (final)
2. (Italy) Jannik Sinner (champion)
3. (Germany) Alexander Zverev (semifinals)
4. (Italy) Lorenzo Musetti (second round)
5. (Australia) Alex de Minaur (quarterfinals)
6. (Canada) Félix Auger-Aliassime (quarterfinals)
7. Daniil Medvedev (second round)
8. (Kazakhstan) Alexander Bublik (quarterfinals)
9. (Norway) Casper Ruud (third round, retired)
10. (Italy) Flavio Cobolli (second round)
11. (Czech Republic) Jiří Lehečka (third round)
12. Karen Khachanov (first round)
13. Andrey Rublev (second round)
14. (United States) Frances Tiafoe (withdrew)
15. (Italy) Luciano Darderi (first round)
16. (Argentina) Francisco Cerúndolo (second round)

Click on the seed number of a player to go to their draw section.

== Draw ==
Key

- Q = Qualifier
- WC = Wild card
- LL = Lucky loser
- Alt = Alternate
- ITF = ITF entry
- PR = Protected ranking
- SR = Special ranking
- SE = Special exempt
- JE = Junior exempt
- JR = Junior Accelerator Programme entrant
- CO = College Accelerator Programme entrant
- NG = Next Gen Accelerator Program entrant
- w/o = Walkover
- r = Retired
- d = Defaulted

=== Finals ===
Quarterfinals
1	(Spain) Carlos Alcaraz	6	6
8	(Kazakhstan) Alexander Bublik	3	0
(Monaco) Valentin Vacherot	6	3	6
5	(Australia) Alex de Minaur	4	6	3
(Brazil) João Fonseca	5	7^{7}	3
3	(Germany) Alexander Zverev	7	6^{3}	6
6	(Canada) Félix Auger-Aliassime	3	4
2	(Italy) Jannik Sinner	6	6

Semifinals
1	(Spain) Carlos Alcaraz	6	6
(Monaco) Valentin Vacherot	4	4
3	(Germany) Alexander Zverev	1	4
2	(Italy) Jannik Sinner	6	6

Final
1	(Spain) Carlos Alcaraz	6^{5}	3
2	(Italy) Jannik Sinner	7^{7}	6

=== Top half ===
==== Section 1 ====
First round
(Argentina) S Báez	7	7
WC	(Switzerland) S Wawrinka	5	5
(Argentina) TM Etcheverry	6	2	6
(Bulgaria) G Dimitrov	4	6	3
(France) T Atmane	6	6
LL	(United States) E Quinn	1	4
11	(Czech Republic) J Lehečka	7^{7}	6^{8}	6
Q	(United States) E Nava	6^{1}	7^{10}	2
(Hungary) M Fucsovics	4	3
(Chile) A Tabilo	6	6
WC	(France) G Monfils	6^{7}	6	6
(Netherlands) T Griekspoor	7^{9}	1	4

Second round
1	(Spain) C Alcaraz	6	6
(Argentina) S Báez	1	3
(Argentina) TM Etcheverry	3	6	6
(France) T Atmane	6	3	2
11	(Czech Republic) J Lehečka	4	7^{7}	6
(Chile) A Tabilo	6	6^{4}	3
WC	(France) G Monfils	4	4
8	(Kazakhstan) A Bublik	6	6

Third round
1	(Spain) C Alcaraz	6	4	6
(Argentina) TM Etcheverry	1	6	3
11	(Czech Republic) J Lehečka	2	5
8	(Kazakhstan) A Bublik	6	7

Quarterfinals
1	(Spain) C Alcaraz	6	6
8	(Kazakhstan) A Bublik	3	0

==== Section 2 ====
First round
(Monaco) V Vacherot	5	6	6
Q	(Argentina) JM Cerúndolo	7	2	1
LL	(Bosnia and Herzegovina) D Džumhur	2	1
(Hungary) F Marozsán	6	6
PR	(Poland) H Hurkacz	7^{7}	5	6
15	(Italy) L Darderi	6^{4}	7	1
10	(Italy) F Cobolli	7	2	6
Q	(Argentina) F Comesaña	5	6	3
(Canada) D Shapovalov	4	6	3
Q	(Belgium) A Blockx	6	4	6
(United Kingdom) C Norrie	6	4	7^{7}
(Serbia) M Kecmanović	2	6	6^{0}

Second round
4	(Italy) L Musetti	6^{6}	5
(Monaco) V Vacherot	7^{8}	7
(Hungary) F Marozsán	2	3
PR	(Poland) H Hurkacz	6	6
10	(Italy) F Cobolli	3	3
Q	(Belgium) A Blockx	6	6
(United Kingdom) C Norrie	6^{5}	6	2
5	(Australia) A de Minaur	7^{7}	2	6

Third round
(Monaco) V Vacherot	6^{4}	6	6
PR	(Poland) H Hurkacz	7^{7}	3	4
Q	(Belgium) A Blockx	5	6^{4}
5	(Australia) A de Minaur	7	7^{7}

Quarterfinals
(Monaco) V Vacherot	6	3	6
5	(Australia) A de Minaur	4	6	3

=== Bottom half ===
==== Section 3 ====
First round
LL	(Spain) R Bautista Agut	0^{r}
WC	(Italy) M Berrettini	4
(Brazil) J Fonseca	6	6
(Canada) G Diallo	2	3
(France) A Rinderknech	7	6
12	K Khachanov	5	2
13	A Rublev	6	1	6
(Portugal) N Borges	4	6	1
(Belgium) Z Bergs	6	6
(France) A Mannarino	4	3
Q	(Chile) C Garín	6	6
LL	(Italy) M Arnaldi	2	4

Second round
7	D Medvedev	0	0
WC	(Italy) M Berrettini	6	6
(Brazil) J Fonseca	7	4	6
(France) A Rinderknech	5	6	3
13	A Rublev	4	1
(Belgium) Z Bergs	6	6
Q	(Chile) C Garín	6	4	5
3	(Germany) A Zverev	4	6	7

Third round
WC	(Italy) M Berrettini	3	2
(Brazil) J Fonseca	6	6
(Belgium) Z Bergs	2	5
3	(Germany) A Zverev	6	7

Quarterfinals
(Brazil) J Fonseca	5	7^{7}	3
3	(Germany) A Zverev	7	6^{3}	6

==== Section 4 ====
First round
(Croatia) M Čilić	6	6
Q	(Kazakhstan) A Shevchenko	1	3
(France) C Moutet	6	6
Q	(France) A Müller	4	1
(Australia) A Popyrin	3	4
9	(Norway) C Ruud	6	6
16	(Argentina) F Cerúndolo	7	6
(Greece) S Tsitsipas	5	4
(Germany) D Altmaier	4	6	3
(Czech Republic) T Macháč	6	1	6
WC	(France) M Kouamé	3	5
(France) U Humbert	6	7

Second round
6	(Canada) F Auger-Aliassime	7^{7}	6
(Croatia) M Čilić	6^{4}	3
(France) C Moutet	5	3
9	(Norway) C Ruud	7	6
16	(Argentina) F Cerúndolo	6^{2}	3
(Czech Republic) T Macháč	7^{7}	6
(France) U Humbert	3	0
2	(Italy) J Sinner	6	6

Third round
6	(Canada) F Auger-Aliassime	7	2
9	(Norway) C Ruud	5	2^{r}
(Czech Republic) T Macháč	1	7^{7}	3
2	(Italy) J Sinner	6	6^{3}	6

Quarterfinals
6	(Canada) F Auger-Aliassime	3	4
2	(Italy) J Sinner	6	6

== Qualifying ==
=== Seeds ===
1. (United States) Ethan Quinn (qualifying competition, lucky loser)
2. (Peru) Ignacio Buse (first round)
3. (Argentina) Juan Manuel Cerúndolo (qualified)
4. (Czech Republic) Vít Kopřiva (first round)
5. (Bosnia and Herzegovina) Damir Džumhur (qualifying competition, lucky loser)
6. (Germany) Jan-Lennard Struff (first round)
7. (Kazakhstan) Alexander Shevchenko (qualified)
8. (Spain) Roberto Bautista Agut (qualifying competition, lucky loser)
9. (Australia) Aleksandar Vukic (first round)
10. (Argentina) Francisco Comesaña (qualified)
11. (France) Quentin Halys (first round)
12. (Belgium) Alexander Blockx (qualified)
13. (France) Alexandre Müller (qualified)
14. (Netherlands) Jesper de Jong (first round)

=== Qualifiers ===
1. (Argentina) Francisco Comesaña
2. (United States) Emilio Nava
3. (Argentina) Juan Manuel Cerúndolo
4. (France) Alexandre Muller
5. (Belgium) Alexander Blockx
6. (Chile) Cristian Garín
7. (Kazakhstan) Alexander Shevchenko

=== Lucky losers ===
1. (United States) Ethan Quinn
2. (Spain) Roberto Bautista Agut
3. (Italy) Matteo Arnaldi
4. (Bosnia and Herzegovina) Damir Džumhur

=== Qualifying draw ===
==== First qualifier ====
First round
1	(United States) Ethan Quinn	3	6	6
(Finland) Otto Virtanen	6	2	3
WC	(Monaco) Romain Arneodo	2	1
10	(Argentina) Francisco Comesaña	6	6

Qualifying competition
1	(United States) Ethan Quinn	5	2
10	(Argentina) Francisco Comesaña	7	6

==== Second qualifier ====
First round
2	(Peru) Ignacio Buse	6	3	3
WC	(Belgium) David Goffin	2	6	6
(United States) Emilio Nava	6	6
11	(France) Quentin Halys	4	4

Qualifying competition
WC	(Belgium) David Goffin	3	7^{8}	6^{2}
(United States) Emilio Nava	6	6^{6}	7^{7}

==== Third qualifier ====
First round
3	(Argentina) Juan Manuel Cerúndolo	6	6
WC	(Monaco) Hugo Nys	3	3
(Spain) Pedro Martínez	6	6
9	(Australia) Aleksandar Vukic	2	4

Qualifying competition
3	(Argentina) Juan Manuel Cerúndolo	6	2	6
(Spain) Pedro Martínez	2	6	3

==== Fourth qualifier ====
First round
4	(Czech Republic) Vít Kopřiva	6	3	2
(Italy) Matteo Arnaldi	2	6	6
(United Kingdom) Jan Choinski	6^{1}	3
13	(France) Alexandre Müller	7^{7}	6

Qualifying competition
(Italy) Matteo Arnaldi	1	7^{7}	4
13	(France) Alexandre Müller	6	6^{4}	6

==== Fifth qualifier ====
First round
5	(Bosnia and Herzegovina) Damir Džumhur	7^{7}	7
WC	(Norway) Nicolai Budkov Kjær	6^{4}	5
(Italy) Francesco Maestrelli	6^{3}	2
12	(Belgium) Alexander Blockx	7^{7}	6

Qualifying competition
5	(Bosnia and Herzegovina) Damir Džumhur	6^{8}	2
12	(Belgium) Alexander Blockx	7^{10}	6

==== Sixth qualifier ====
First round
6	(Germany) Jan-Lennard Struff	3	3
Alt	(Georgia (country)) Nikoloz Basilashvili	6	6
(Chile) Cristian Garín	7	1	6
14	(Netherlands) Jesper de Jong	5	6	1

Qualifying competition
Alt	(Georgia (country)) Nikoloz Basilashvili	5	0
(Chile) Cristian Garín	7	6

==== Seventh qualifier ====
First round
7	(Kazakhstan) Alexander Shevchenko	6	0
Alt	(Italy) Andrea Pellegrino	0	0^{r}
(France) Benjamin Bonzi	4	3
8	(Spain) Roberto Bautista Agut	6	6

Qualifying competition
7	(Kazakhstan) Alexander Shevchenko	7^{7}	7^{7}
8	(Spain) Roberto Bautista Agut	6^{3}	6^{4}
