= 2025 Abruzzo Open – Doubles =

Doubles
- 2025 Abruzzo Open

Final
- Champions: (Venezuela) Luis David Martínez (Argentina) Facundo Mena
- Runners-up: (France) Théo Arribagé (France) Grégoire Jacq
- Score: 7–5, 2–6, [10–6]

Events
Singles	Doubles
- Francavilla al Mare Open

Théo Arribagé and Victor Vlad Cornea were the defending champions but chose to defend their title with different partners. Arribagé partnered Grégoire Jacq but lost in the final to Luis David Martínez and Facundo Mena. Cornea partnered Karol Drzewiecki but lost in the first round to Martínez and Mena.

Martínez and Mena won the title after defeating Arribagé and Jacq 7–5, 2–6, [10–6] in the final.

== Seeds ==
1. (France) Théo Arribagé / (France) Grégoire Jacq (final)
2. (Ecuador) Gonzalo Escobar / (Ecuador) Diego Hidalgo (first round, retired)
3. (United States) Robert Cash / (United States) JJ Tracy (semifinals)
4. (Romania) Victor Vlad Cornea / (Poland) Karol Drzewiecki (first round)

== Draw ==
Key

- Q = Qualifier
- WC = Wild card
- LL = Lucky loser
- Alt = Alternate
- ITF = ITF entry
- PR = Protected ranking
- SR = Special ranking
- SE = Special exempt
- JE = Junior exempt
- JR = Junior Accelerator Programme entrant
- CO = College Accelerator Programme entrant
- NG = Next Gen Accelerator Program entrant
- w/o = Walkover
- r = Retired
- d = Defaulted

=== Draw ===
First round
1	(France) T Arribagé (France) G Jacq	7	3	[10]
WC	(Italy) Alessandro Coccioli (Italy) Lorenzo Lorusso	5	6	[6]
(New Zealand) F Reynolds (New Zealand) J Watt	4	7^{10}	[7]
I Liutarevich (Netherlands) M Veldheer	6	6^{8}	[10]
3	(United States) R Cash (United States) JJ Tracy	6	7^{7}
(Spain) Í Cervantes (Argentina) G Durán	4	6^{4}
(Peru) A Merino (Germany) C Negritu	7^{7}	6^{5}	[10]
(Romania) A Jecan (Netherlands) T Loof	6^{3}	7^{7}	[6]
(Netherlands) M Hermans (Portugal) T Pereira	1	6	[4]
(India) S Banthia (Bulgaria) A Donski	6	3	[10]
(Venezuela) LD Martínez (Argentina) F Mena	3	6	[11]
4	(Romania) V Cornea (Poland) K Drzewiecki	6	3	[9]
WC	(Italy) G Ricca (Italy) Lorenzo Sciahbasi	6^{1}	7^{7}	[9]
(France) J Eysseric (United States) G Goldhoff	7^{7}	6^{2}	[11]
(Belgium) K Coppejans (Spain) S Martos Gornés	0	4
2	(Ecuador) G Escobar (Ecuador) D Hidalgo	6	4^{r}

Quarterfinals
1	(France) T Arribagé (France) G Jacq	7^{7}	6
I Liutarevich (Netherlands) M Veldheer	6^{4}	3
3	(United States) R Cash (United States) JJ Tracy	6	7^{16}
(Peru) A Merino (Germany) C Negritu	4	6^{14}
(India) S Banthia (Bulgaria) A Donski	6	1	[5]
(Venezuela) LD Martínez (Argentina) F Mena	2	6	[10]
(France) J Eysseric (United States) G Goldhoff	6	6
(Belgium) K Coppejans (Spain) S Martos Gornés	2	3

Semifinals
1	(France) T Arribagé (France) G Jacq	7	7^{7}
3	(United States) R Cash (United States) JJ Tracy	5	6^{3}
(Venezuela) LD Martínez (Argentina) F Mena	6^{7}	6	[10]
(France) J Eysseric (United States) G Goldhoff	7^{9}	3	[8]

Final
1	(France) T Arribagé (France) G Jacq	5	6	[6]
(Venezuela) LD Martínez (Argentina) F Mena	7	2	[10]
