= 2026 Swiss Indoors – Singles =

Singles
- 2026 Swiss Indoors

Final
- Champion: (Monaco) Valentin Vacherot
- Runner-up: (Czech Republic) Jiří Lehečka
- Score: 2–6, 6–3, 6–3
- Date: 1 November 2026

Details
- Draw: 32 (4 Q / 3 WC )
- Seeds: 8

Events
Singles	Doubles
- Swiss Indoors

At the 2026 Swiss Indoors, Valentin Vacherot defeated Jiří Lehečka in the final, 2–6, 6–3, 6–3 to win the men's singles tennis title. The tournament took place on indoor hard courts in Basel, Switzerland and was an ATP 500-level event. It was his second career ATP Tour singles title.

João Fonseca was the reigning champion, but withdrew before the tournament due to injury.

This tournament marked the final professional appearance of three-time major champion, Olympic doubles gold medalist, and former world No. 3 Stan Wawrinka. He lost in the first round to Lehečka.

== Seeds ==
1. (United States) Ben Shelton (second round)
2. (France) Arthur Fils (quarterfinals, retired)
3. (Spain) Rafael Jódar (second round)
4. (Serbia) Novak Djokovic (second round)
5. (Spain) Alejandro Davidovich Fokina (withdrew)
6. (United States) Taylor Fritz (semifinals)
7. (Kazakhstan) Alexander Bublik (withdrew)
8. (Czech Republic) Jiří Lehečka (final)
9. (Norway) Casper Ruud (second round)
10. (Poland) Hubert Hurkacz (second round)

== Draw ==
Key

- Q = Qualifier
- WC = Wild card
- LL = Lucky loser
- Alt = Alternate
- ITF = ITF entry
- PR = Protected ranking
- SR = Special ranking
- SE = Special exempt
- JE = Junior exempt
- JR = Junior Accelerator Programme entrant
- CO = College Accelerator Programme entrant
- NG = Next Gen Accelerator Program entrant
- w/o = Walkover
- r = Retired
- d = Defaulted

=== Finals ===
Semifinals
8	(Czech Republic) Jiří Lehečka	3	7	6
SE	(Germany) Jan-Lennard Struff	6	5	4
(Monaco) Valentin Vacherot	7^{7}	6
6	(United States) Taylor Fritz	6^{5}	3

Final
8	(Czech Republic) Jiří Lehečka	6	3	3
(Monaco) Valentin Vacherot	2	6	6

=== Top half ===
First round
1	(United States) B Shelton	6^{4}	7^{7}	7^{7}
LL	(United States) A Kovacevic	7^{7}	6^{3}	6^{4}
WC	(Switzerland) J Kym	7^{7}	6
(France) A Rinderknech	6^{1}	4
LL	(Germany) D Altmaier	6^{5}	7^{7}	6
Q	(Argentina) JM Cerúndolo	7^{7}	6^{4}	4
WC	(Switzerland) S Wawrinka	5	6^{2}
8	(Czech Republic) J Lehečka	7	7^{7}
4/WC	(Serbia) N Djokovic	4	6	6
(France) U Humbert	6	3	4
Q	(Germany) Y Hanfmann	4	3
SE	(Germany) J-L Struff	6	6
LL	(Switzerland) M Brunold	3	1
(Portugal) N Borges	6	6
WC	(Switzerland) D Stricker	6	5	3
9	(Norway) C Ruud	4	7	6

Second round
1	(United States) B Shelton	3	7^{7}	6^{1}
WC	(Switzerland) J Kym	6	6^{4}	7^{7}
LL	(Germany) D Altmaier	5	4
8	(Czech Republic) J Lehečka	7	6
4/WC	(Serbia) N Djokovic	7^{7}	5	6^{5}
SE	(Germany) J-L Struff	6^{4}	7	7^{7}
(Portugal) N Borges	1	6	6
9	(Norway) C Ruud	6	3	4

Quarterfinals
WC	(Switzerland) J Kym	4	2
8	(Czech Republic) J Lehečka	6	6
SE	(Germany) J-L Struff	6	6
(Portugal) N Borges	2	3

Semifinals
8	(Czech Republic) J Lehečka	3	7	6
SE	(Germany) J-L Struff	6	5	4

=== Bottom half ===
First round
10	(Poland) H Hurkacz	3	6	6
(Belgium) Z Bergs	6	3	4
PR	(Denmark) H Rune	6	6^{2}	7^{7}
(France) Q Halys	4	7^{7}	6^{5}
(Monaco) V Vacherot	6	7^{7}
(Argentina) M Navone	3	6^{4}
(Chile) A Tabilo	4	2
3	(Spain) R Jódar	6	6
6	(United States) T Fritz	6	7^{7}
LL	(Australia) R Hijikata	4	6^{3}
Q	(Switzerland) R Bertola	4	2
(Canada) D Shapovalov	6	6
(United States) A Michelsen	5	6	6
(Netherlands) B van de Zandschulp	7	3	3
Q	(France) G Mpetshi Perricard	6^{5}	5
2	(France) A Fils	7^{7}	7

Second round
10	(Poland) H Hurkacz	6	3	6^{7}
PR	(Denmark) H Rune	3	6	7^{9}
(Monaco) V Vacherot	7^{7}	2	7^{7}
3	(Spain) R Jódar	6^{4}	6	6^{5}
6	(United States) T Fritz	6	6
(Canada) D Shapovalov	4	3
(United States) A Michelsen	6	3	6^{5}
2	(France) A Fils	4	6	7^{7}

Quarterfinals
PR	(Denmark) H Rune	3	6	3
(Monaco) V Vacherot	6	3	6
6	(United States) T Fritz	6	2
2	(France) A Fils	2	0^{r}

Semifinals
(Monaco) V Vacherot	7^{7}	6
6	(United States) T Fritz	6^{5}	3

== Qualifying ==
=== Seeds ===
1. (Argentina) Sebastián Báez (first round)
2. (Argentina) Juan Manuel Cerúndolo (qualified)
3. (Portugal) Jaime Faria (first round)
4. (Serbia) Miomir Kecmanović (first round)
5. (Germany) Jan-Lennard Struff (special exempt to main draw)
6. (Germany) Yannick Hanfmann (qualified)
7. (Germany) Daniel Altmaier (qualifying competition, lucky loser)
8. (Australia) James Duckworth (first round)

=== Qualifiers ===
1. (France) Giovanni Mpetshi Perricard
2. (Argentina) Juan Manuel Cerúndolo
3. (Switzerland) Rémy Bertola
4. (Germany) Yannick Hanfmann

=== Lucky losers ===
1. (Germany) Daniel Altmaier
2. (Switzerland) Mika Brunold
3. (United States) Aleksandar Kovacevic
4. (Australia) Rinky Hijikata

=== Qualifying draw ===
==== First qualifier ====
First round
1	(Argentina) Sebastián Báez	3	6	3
(France) Giovanni Mpetshi Perricard	6	3	6
(United States) Aleksandar Kovacevic	7^{8}	6
8	(Australia) James Duckworth	6^{6}	3

Qualifying competition
(France) Giovanni Mpetshi Perricard	7^{7}	7^{8}
(United States) Aleksandar Kovacevic	6^{2}	6^{6}

==== Second qualifier ====
First round
2	(Argentina) Juan Manuel Cerúndolo	6	6
(United States) Zachary Svajda	4	3
WC	(Switzerland) Henry Bernet	5	6^{5}
7	(Germany) Daniel Altmaier	7	7^{7}

Qualifying competition
2	(Argentina) Juan Manuel Cerúndolo	7^{11}	6
7	(Germany) Daniel Altmaier	6^{9}	3

==== Third qualifier ====
First round
3	(Portugal) Jaime Faria	6^{4}	6^{5}
WC	(Switzerland) Mika Brunold	7^{7}	7^{7}
WC	(Switzerland) Rémy Bertola	6	6
Alt	(Switzerland) Jakub Paul	2	1

Qualifying competition
WC	(Switzerland) Mika Brunold	6^{5}	4
WC	(Switzerland) Rémy Bertola	7^{7}	6

==== Fourth qualifier ====
First round
4	(Serbia) Miomir Kecmanović	6^{5}	3
(Australia) Rinky Hijikata	7^{7}	6
(United States) Marcos Giron	2	7	4
6	(Germany) Yannick Hanfmann	6	5	6

Qualifying competition
(Australia) Rinky Hijikata	4	6	3
6	(Germany) Yannick Hanfmann	6	1	6
