= 2025 Rolex Shanghai Masters – Singles =

Singles
- 2025 Rolex Shanghai Masters

Final
- Champion: (Monaco) Valentin Vacherot
- Runner-up: (France) Arthur Rinderknech
- Score: 4–6, 6–3, 6–3

Details
- Draw: 96 (12 Q / 5 WC)
- Seeds: 32

Events
Singles	Doubles
- Shanghai Masters

Qualifier Valentin Vacherot defeated his first cousin Arthur Rinderknech in the final, 4–6, 6–3, 6–3 to win the singles tennis title at the 2025 Shanghai Masters. It was his first ATP Tour title, and he defeated five seeded opponents consecutively en route. Vacherot became the first Monégasque player to win a tour singles title, the first unseeded champion at the Shanghai Masters, and the lowest-ranked ATP Masters 1000 champion (ranked No. 204). Vacherot was the third qualifier (after Roberto Carretero and Albert Portas at the 1996 and 2001 Hamburg Masters, respectively) to win an ATP Masters 1000 title, and the fifth player overall to win an ATP Masters 1000 as their first tour-level title.

This marked the first Shanghai final, and third ATP Masters 1000 final (after the 1996 Hamburg Masters and the 2003 Paris Masters) to be contested by two unseeded opponents. As first cousins, Vacherot and Rinderknech were the first pair of family members to contest an ATP Tour final since brothers John and Patrick McEnroe at the 1991 Chicago Open.

Jannik Sinner was the defending champion, but retired in the third round against Tallon Griekspoor.

At 38 years, 140 days old, Novak Djokovic reached a record 80th ATP Masters 1000 semifinal and extended his record as the oldest such semifinalist (since the format's establishment in 1990). The second-round match between Djokovic (38 years, 134 days) and Marin Čilić (37 years, 5 days) was the oldest Masters 1000 singles match in terms of combined ages (75 years and 139 days) since the format began in 1990.

== Seeds ==
All seeds received a bye into the second round.

1. (Spain) Carlos Alcaraz (withdrew)
2. (Italy) Jannik Sinner (third round, retired)
3. (Germany) Alexander Zverev (third round)
4. (Serbia) Novak Djokovic (semifinals)
5. (United States) Taylor Fritz (third round)
6. (United States) Ben Shelton (second round)
7. (Australia) Alex de Minaur (quarterfinals)
8. (Italy) Lorenzo Musetti (fourth round)
9. Karen Khachanov (second round)
10. (Denmark) Holger Rune (quarterfinals)
11. (Norway) Casper Ruud (second round, retired)
12. (Canada) Félix Auger-Aliassime (quarterfinals)
13. Andrey Rublev (second round)
14. (Kazakhstan) Alexander Bublik (second round)
15. (Czech Republic) Jiří Lehečka (fourth round)
16. Daniil Medvedev (semifinals)
17. (Czech Republic) Jakub Menšík (second round)
18. (Spain) Alejandro Davidovich Fokina (third round)
19. (Argentina) Francisco Cerúndolo (third round)
20. (Czech Republic) Tomáš Macháč (third round, retired)
21. (France) Ugo Humbert (third round)
22. (Italy) Flavio Cobolli (second round)
23. (Canada) Denis Shapovalov (third round)
24. (Greece) Stefanos Tsitsipas (withdrew)
25. (United States) Frances Tiafoe (second round)
26. (Italy) Luciano Darderi (third round)
27. (Netherlands) Tallon Griekspoor (fourth round)
28. (United States) Alex Michelsen (second round)
29. (United States) Brandon Nakashima (second round)
30. (United Kingdom) Cameron Norrie (third round)
31. (Canada) Gabriel Diallo (fourth round)
32. (France) Giovanni Mpetshi Perricard (fourth round)
33. (France) Corentin Moutet (second round)

Click on the seed number of a player to go to their draw section.

== Draw ==
Key

- Q = Qualifier
- WC = Wild card
- LL = Lucky loser
- Alt = Alternate
- ITF = ITF entry
- PR = Protected ranking
- SR = Special ranking
- SE = Special exempt
- JE = Junior exempt
- JR = Junior Accelerator Programme entrant
- CO = College Accelerator Programme entrant
- NG = Next Gen Accelerator Program entrant
- w/o = Walkover
- r = Retired
- d = Defaulted

=== Finals ===
Quarterfinals
16	Daniil Medvedev	6	6
7	(Australia) Alex de Minaur	4	4
(France) Arthur Rinderknech	6	6
12	(Canada) Félix Auger-Aliassime	3	4
(Belgium) Zizou Bergs	3	5
4	(Serbia) Novak Djokovic	6	7
10	(Denmark) Holger Rune	6	6^{4}	4
Q	(Monaco) Valentin Vacherot	2	7^{7}	6

Semifinals
16	Daniil Medvedev	6	2	4
(France) Arthur Rinderknech	4	6	6
4	(Serbia) Novak Djokovic	3	4
Q	(Monaco) Valentin Vacherot	6	6

Final
(France) Arthur Rinderknech	6	3	3
Q	(Monaco) Valentin Vacherot	4	6	6

=== Top half ===
==== Section 1 ====
First round
(United States) L Tien	4	6	6
(Serbia) M Kecmanović	6	3	4
(France) A Cazaux	6	3	7
(Spain) P Martínez	3	6	5
(Italy) M Arnaldi	7^{7}	6
Q	(Japan) R Sakamoto	6^{3}	4
WC	(China) Y Wu	5	0^{r}
Q	(Czech Republic) D Svrčina	7	0

Second round
33	(France) C Moutet	6	4	4
(United States) L Tien	4	6	6
(France) A Cazaux	3	6	6^{5}
30	(United Kingdom) C Norrie	6	0	7^{7}
18	(Spain) A Davidovich Fokina	6	6
(Italy) M Arnaldi	4	4
Q	(Czech Republic) D Svrčina	1	1
16	D Medvedev	6	6

Third round
(United States) L Tien	7^{7}	6
30	(United Kingdom) C Norrie	6^{4}	3
18	(Spain) A Davidovich Fokina	3	6^{5}
16	D Medvedev	6	7^{7}

Fourth round
(United States) L Tien	6^{6}	7^{7}	4
16	D Medvedev	7^{8}	6^{1}	6

==== Section 2 ====
First round
(United States) A Kovacevic	4	6	3
WC	(China) J Shang	6	3	6
(Netherlands) B van de Zandschulp	6^{5}	6^{5}
(Portugal) N Borges	7^{7}	7^{7}
(Poland) K Majchrzak	6	6
(United States) E Quinn	3	4
(Argentina) C Ugo Carabelli	4
(France) T Atmane	4^{r}

Second round
9	K Khachanov	6^{3}	3
WC	(China) J Shang	7^{7}	6
(Portugal) N Borges	7^{9}	6
LL	(Australia) A Vukic	6^{7}	4
29	(United States) B Nakashima	4	0
(Poland) K Majchrzak	6	6
(Argentina) C Ugo Carabelli	4	2
7	(Australia) A de Minaur	6	6

Third round
WC	(China) J Shang	6^{5}	6	3
(Portugal) N Borges	7^{7}	4	6
(Poland) K Majchrzak	1	5
7	(Australia) A de Minaur	6	7

Fourth round
(Portugal) N Borges	5	2
7	(Australia) A de Minaur	7	6

==== Section 3 ====
First round
Q	(France) V Royer	3	6	6
(Argentina) M Navone	6	4	4
(France) A Rinderknech	6^{3}	1
(Serbia) H Medjedovic	7^{7}	0^{r}
(Bosnia and Herzegovina) D Džumhur	2	4
(Australia) C O'Connell	6	6
LL	(United States) M McDonald	3	2
(France) Q Halys	6	6

Second round
3	(Germany) A Zverev	6	6
Q	(France) V Royer	4	4
(France) A Rinderknech	6	6
28	(United States) A Michelsen	3	4
23	(Canada) D Shapovalov	6	6
(Australia) C O'Connell	3	2
(France) Q Halys	4	5
15	(Czech Republic) J Lehečka	6	7

Third round
3	(Germany) A Zverev	6	3	2
(France) A Rinderknech	4	6	6
23	(Canada) D Shapovalov	4	4
15	(Czech Republic) J Lehečka	6	6

Fourth round
(France) A Rinderknech	6	7^{7}
15	(Czech Republic) J Lehečka	3	6^{5}

==== Section 4 ====
First round
(United States) M Giron	4	3
Q	(Chile) A Tabilo	6	6
WC	(China) Y Zhou	7^{7}	2	6^{3}
(Netherlands) J de Jong	6^{1}	6	7^{7}
(China) Y Bu	6	6^{5}	6
(Argentina) JM Cerúndolo	3	7^{7}	3
(Argentina) F Comesaña	6	6
Q	(France) U Blanchet	4	2

Second round
12	(Canada) F Auger-Aliassime	6	6
Q	(Chile) A Tabilo	3	3
(Netherlands) J de Jong	4	7^{7}	6
17	(Czech Republic) J Menšík	6	6^{2}	4
26	(Italy) L Darderi	6	6
(China) Y Bu	4	4
(Argentina) F Comesaña	4	0
8	(Italy) L Musetti	6	6

Third round
12	(Canada) F Auger-Aliassime	6	7
(Netherlands) J de Jong	4	5
26	(Italy) L Darderi	5	6^{1}
8	(Italy) L Musetti	7	7^{7}

Fourth round
12	(Canada) F Auger-Aliassime	6	6
8	(Italy) L Musetti	4	2

=== Bottom half ===
==== Section 5 ====
First round
(Belgium) D Goffin	6^{6}	6	6
(France) A Müller	7^{8}	1	1
(United States) R Opelka	6^{2}	4
(France) B Bonzi	7^{7}	6
(France) A Mannarino	7	7^{7}
(Italy) M Berrettini	5	6^{5}
(United States) S Korda	4	5
(Belgium) Z Bergs	6	7

Second round
6	(United States) B Shelton	2	4
(Belgium) D Goffin	6	6
(France) B Bonzi	4	4
31	(Canada) G Diallo	6	6
19	(Argentina) F Cerúndolo	7^{7}	7^{7}
(France) A Mannarino	6^{3}	6^{4}
(Belgium) Z Bergs	3	7	4
11	(Norway) C Ruud	6	5	1^{r}

Third round
(Belgium) D Goffin	0^{r}
31	(Canada) G Diallo	3
19	(Argentina) F Cerúndolo	6^{1}	3
(Belgium) Z Bergs	7^{7}	6

Fourth round
31	(Canada) G Diallo	6	5	6^{8}
(Belgium) Z Bergs	3	7	7^{10}

==== Section 6 ====
First round
Q	(Japan) Y Nishioka	6	6
(Kazakhstan) A Shevchenko	1	2
(Spain) J Munar	4	7	6
(Hungary) M Fucsovics	6	5	1
(Italy) L Sonego	6	3	1
Q	(Germany) Y Hanfmann	2	6	6
(Croatia) M Čilić	6	7^{7}
Q	(Georgia (country)) N Basilashvili	3	6^{5}

Second round
13	A Rublev	6	1	4
Q	(Japan) Y Nishioka	2	6	6
(Spain) J Munar	7	6
22	(Italy) F Cobolli	5	1
25	(United States) F Tiafoe	7^{11}	2	1
Q	(Germany) Y Hanfmann	6^{9}	6	6
(Croatia) M Čilić	6^{2}	4
4	(Serbia) N Djokovic	7^{7}	6

Third round
Q	(Japan) Y Nishioka	4	7	1
(Spain) J Munar	6	5	6
Q	(Germany) Y Hanfmann	6	5	3
4	(Serbia) N Djokovic	4	7	6

Fourth round
(Spain) J Munar	3	7	2
4	(Serbia) N Djokovic	6	5	6

==== Section 7 ====
First round
(Hungary) F Marozsán	6	4	6
WC	(Switzerland) S Wawrinka	1	6	4
PR	(Austria) S Ofner	6	3	2
(Italy) L Nardi	3	6	6
(Australia) J Thompson	4	6	6
Q	(Denmark) A Holmgren	6	3	4
WC	(China) Z Zhang	6	3	4
(Argentina) S Báez	2	6	6

Second round
5	(United States) T Fritz	2	7^{7}	7^{7}
(Hungary) F Marozsán	6	6^{4}	6^{1}
(Italy) L Nardi	3	6^{4}
32	(France) G Mpetshi Perricard	6	7^{7}
21	(France) U Humbert	6	7^{7}
(Australia) J Thompson	3	6^{4}
(Argentina) S Báez	5	4
10	(Denmark) H Rune	7	6

Third round
5	(United States) T Fritz	4	5
32	(France) G Mpetshi Perricard	6	7
21	(France) U Humbert	4	4
10	(Denmark) H Rune	6	6

Fourth round
32	(France) G Mpetshi Perricard	4	7^{9}	3
10	(Denmark) H Rune	6	6^{7}	6

==== Section 8 ====
First round
(Serbia) L Djere	3	4
Q	(Monaco) V Vacherot	6	6
(Australia) A Walton	6^{6}	1
(Italy) M Bellucci	7^{8}	6
PR	(United States) J Brooksby	7^{7}	6
Q	(Japan) J Trotter	6^{2}	1
Q	(Australia) T Schoolkate	3	4
(Germany) D Altmaier	6	6

Second round
14	(Kazakhstan) A Bublik	6	3	4
Q	(Monaco) V Vacherot	3	6	6
(Italy) M Bellucci	3	4
20	(Czech Republic) T Macháč	6	6
27	(Netherlands) T Griekspoor	6	1	6
PR	(United States) J Brooksby	1	6	1
(Germany) D Altmaier	3	3
2	(Italy) J Sinner	6	6

Third round
Q	(Monaco) V Vacherot	6	3
20	(Czech Republic) T Macháč	0	1^{r}
27	(Netherlands) T Griekspoor	6^{3}	7	3
2	(Italy) J Sinner	7^{7}	5	2^{r}

Fourth round
Q	(Monaco) V Vacherot	4	7^{7}	6
27	(Netherlands) T Griekspoor	6	6^{1}	4

== Seeded players ==
The following are the seeded players. Seedings are based on ATP rankings as of 22 September 2025. Rankings and points before are as of 29 September 2025.

Seed	Rank	Player	Points before	Points dropping	Points won	Points after	Status
1	1	(Spain) Carlos Alcaraz	11,540	200	0	11,340	Withdrew due to ankle injury
2	2	(Italy) Jannik Sinner	10,950	1,000	50	10,000	Third round retired against (Netherlands) Tallon Griekspoor [27]
3	3	(Germany) Alexander Zverev	5,980	100	50	5,930	Third round lost to (France) Arthur Rinderknech
4	5	(Serbia) Novak Djokovic	4,830	650	400	4,580	Semifinals lost to (Monaco) Valentin Vacherot [Q]
5	4	(United States) Taylor Fritz	4,995	400	50	4,645	Third round lost to (France) Giovanni Mpetshi Perricard [32]
6	6	(United States) Ben Shelton	4,190	100	10	4,100	Second round lost to (Belgium) David Goffin
7	7	(Australia) Alex de Minaur	3,735	0	200	3,935	Quarterfinals lost to Daniil Medvedev [16]
8	9	(Italy) Lorenzo Musetti	3,555	10	100	3,645	Fourth round lost to (Canada) Félix Auger-Aliassime [12]
9	10	Karen Khachanov	3,190	10	10	3,190	Second round lost to (China) Shang Juncheng [WC]
10	11	(Denmark) Holger Rune	2,990	100	200	3,090	Quarterfinals lost to (Monaco) Valentin Vacherot [Q]
11	12	(Norway) Casper Ruud	2,945	10	10	2,945	Second round retired against (Belgium) Zizou Bergs
12	13	(Canada) Félix Auger-Aliassime	2,755	(50)^{†}	200	2,905	Quarterfinals lost to (France) Arthur Rinderknech
13	14	Andrey Rublev	2,560	10	10	2,560	Second round lost to (Japan) Yoshihito Nishioka [Q]
14	17	(Kazakhstan) Alexander Bublik	2,445	(25)^{†}	10	2,430	Second round lost to (Monaco) Valentin Vacherot [Q]
15	19	(Czech Republic) Jiří Lehečka	2,365	50	100	2,415	Fourth round lost to (France) Arthur Rinderknech
16	18	Daniil Medvedev	2,410	200	400	2,610	Semifinals lost to (France) Arthur Rinderknech
17	16	(Czech Republic) Jakub Menšík	2,455	200	10	2,265	Second round lost to (Netherlands) Jesper de Jong
18	20	(Spain) Alejandro Davidovich Fokina	2,240	30	50	2,260	Third round lost to Daniil Medvedev [16]
19	21	(Argentina) Francisco Cerúndolo	2,135	(50)^{†}	50	2,135	Third round lost to (Belgium) Zizou Bergs
20	23	(Czech Republic) Tomáš Macháč	1,920	400	50	1,570	Third round retired against (Monaco) Valentin Vacherot [Q]
21	26	(France) Ugo Humbert	1,725	50	50	1,725	Third round lost to (Denmark) Holger Rune [10]
22	22	(Italy) Flavio Cobolli	1,990	50	10	1,950	Second round lost to (Spain) Jaume Munar
23	24	(Canada) Denis Shapovalov	1,838	50	50	1,838	Third round lost to (Czech Republic) Jiří Lehečka [15]
24	25	(Greece) Stefanos Tsitsipas	1,830	100	0	1,730	Withdrew due to leg injury
25	28	(United States) Frances Tiafoe	1,640	50	10	1,600	Second round lost to (Germany) Yannick Hanfmann [Q]
26	29	(Italy) Luciano Darderi	1,609	10	50	1,649	Third round lost to (Italy) Lorenzo Musetti [8]
27	31	(Netherlands) Tallon Griekspoor	1,565	50	100	1,615	Fourth round lost to (Monaco) Valentin Vacherot [Q]
28	34	(United States) Alex Michelsen	1,385	30	10	1,365	Second round lost to (France) Arthur Rinderknech
29	32	(United States) Brandon Nakashima	1,470	(50)^{†}	10	1,430	Second round lost to (Poland) Kamil Majchrzak
30	33	(United Kingdom) Cameron Norrie	1,397	0+14	50+0	1,433	Third round lost to (United States) Learner Tien
31	35	(Canada) Gabriel Diallo	1,308	30+35	100+25	1,368	Fourth round lost to (Belgium) Zizou Bergs
32	37	(France) Giovanni Mpetshi Perricard	1,275	10	100	1,365	Fourth round lost to (Denmark) Holger Rune [10]
33	38	(France) Corentin Moutet	1,258	(25)^{†}	10	1,243	Second round lost to (United States) Learner Tien

† The player's 2024 points were replaced by a better result for purposes of his ranking as of 29 September 2025. Points for his 19th best result will be deducted instead.

=== Withdrawn seeded players ===
The following players would have been seeded, but withdrew before the tournament began.

Rank	Player	Points before	Points dropping	Points after	Withdrawal reason
8	(United Kingdom) Jack Draper	3,590	0	3,590	Arm injury
15	(United States) Tommy Paul	2,460	100	2,360	Foot injury
27	(Bulgaria) Grigor Dimitrov	1,645	100	1,545	Pectoral injury
30	(France) Arthur Fils	1,570	10	1,560	Back injury

== Other entry information ==
=== Wildcards ===
- (China) Shang Juncheng
- (Switzerland) Stan Wawrinka
- (China) Wu Yibing
- (China) Zhang Zhizhen
- (China) Zhou Yi

=== Protected ranking ===
- (United States) Jenson Brooksby
- (Austria) Sebastian Ofner

=== Withdrawals ===
- § (Spain) Carlos Alcaraz → replaced by (United States) Mackenzie McDonald (LL)
- ‡ (Spain) Roberto Bautista Agut → replaced by (Netherlands) Jesper de Jong
- ‡ (Bulgaria) Grigor Dimitrov → replaced by (Belgium) David Goffin
- ‡ (United Kingdom) Jack Draper → replaced by (France) Adrian Mannarino
- ‡ (Argentina) Tomás Martín Etcheverry → replaced by (Argentina) Juan Manuel Cerúndolo
- ‡ (United Kingdom) Jacob Fearnley → replaced by (Australia) Adam Walton
- ‡ (France) Arthur Fils → replaced by (Argentina) Mariano Navone
- ‡ (Brazil) João Fonseca → replaced by (Italy) Luca Nardi
- ‡ (Poland) Hubert Hurkacz → replaced by (United States) Ethan Quinn
- ‡ (France) Gaël Monfils → replaced by (Australia) Christopher O'Connell
- ‡ (United States) Tommy Paul → replaced by (France) Arthur Cazaux
- ‡ (Australia) Alexei Popyrin → replaced by (France) Arthur Rinderknech
- § (Greece) Stefanos Tsitsipas → replaced by (Australia) Aleksandar Vukic (LL)

‡ – withdrew from entry list
§ – withdrew from main draw

== Qualifying ==
=== Seeds ===
1. (Chile) Alejandro Tabilo (qualified)
2. (France) Valentin Royer (qualified)
3. (Czech Republic) Dalibor Svrčina (qualified)
4. (Australia) Aleksandar Vukic (qualifying competition, lucky loser)
5. (United States) Mackenzie McDonald (qualifying competition, lucky loser)
6. (Austria) Filip Misolic (first round)
7. (Australia) Tristan Schoolkate (qualified)
8. (Georgia (country)) Nikoloz Basilashvili (qualified)
9. (Japan) Shintaro Mochizuki (first round)
10. (United States) Nishesh Basavareddy (first round)
11. (Australia) James Duckworth (first round)
12. (Australia) Rinky Hijikata (qualifying competition)
13. (United States) Brandon Holt (first round)
14. (Canada) Liam Draxl (qualifying competition)
15. (United States) Tristan Boyer (first round)
16. (Chinese Taipei) Tseng Chun-hsin (first round)
17. (United States) Eliot Spizzirri (qualifying competition)
18. (United Kingdom) Billy Harris (qualifying competition)
19. (United States) Colton Smith (first round)
20. (Japan) Yosuke Watanuki (qualifying competition)
21. (France) Ugo Blanchet (qualified)
22. (France) Harold Mayot (qualifying competition)
23. (Hungary) Zsombor Piros (withdrew)
24. (Hong Kong) Coleman Wong (first round)

=== Qualifiers ===
1. (Chile) Alejandro Tabilo
2. (France) Valentin Royer
3. (Czech Republic) Dalibor Svrčina
4. (Japan) Yoshihito Nishioka
5. (Japan) Rei Sakamoto
6. (France) Ugo Blanchet
7. (Australia) Tristan Schoolkate
8. (Georgia (country)) Nikoloz Basilashvili
9. (Germany) Yannick Hanfmann
10. (Monaco) Valentin Vacherot
11. (Denmark) August Holmgren
12. (Japan) James Trotter

=== Lucky losers ===
1. (United States) Mackenzie McDonald
2. (Australia) Aleksandar Vukic

=== Qualifying draw ===
==== First qualifier ====
First round
1	(Chile) Alejandro Tabilo	6	7
WC	(China) Cui Jie	3	5
WC	(China) Sun Fajing	5	3
22	(France) Harold Mayot	7	6

Qualifying competition
1	(Chile) Alejandro Tabilo	6	6
22	(France) Harold Mayot	3	4

==== Second qualifier ====
First round
2	(France) Valentin Royer	6	6
(France) Titouan Droguet	1	2
(Japan) Taro Daniel	4	2
18	(United Kingdom) Billy Harris	6	6

Qualifying competition
2	(France) Valentin Royer	7^{7}	6
18	(United Kingdom) Billy Harris	6^{2}	4

==== Third qualifier ====
First round
3	(Czech Republic) Dalibor Svrčina	6	6
(Italy) Giulio Zeppieri	2	4
WC	(China) Liu Hanyi	6^{3}	2
20	(Japan) Yosuke Watanuki	7^{7}	6

Qualifying competition
3	(Czech Republic) Dalibor Svrčina	6	6
20	(Japan) Yosuke Watanuki	4	0

==== Fourth qualifier ====
First round
4	(Australia) Aleksandar Vukic	1	7	7^{7}
Alt	(Switzerland) Marc-Andrea Hüsler	6	5	6^{5}
(Japan) Yoshihito Nishioka	6	6
Alt	(Japan) Rio Noguchi	3	2

Qualifying competition
4	(Australia) Aleksandar Vukic	3	3
(Japan) Yoshihito Nishioka	6	6

==== Fifth qualifier ====
First round
5	(United States) Mackenzie McDonald	6	6
(Australia) Omar Jasika	0	4
(Japan) Rei Sakamoto	6	7
13	(United States) Brandon Holt	1	5

Qualifying competition
5	(United States) Mackenzie McDonald	4	3
(Japan) Rei Sakamoto	6	6

==== Sixth qualifier ====
First round
6	(Austria) Filip Misolic	5	6	2
(United States) Christopher Eubanks	7	4	6
WC	(China) Te Rigele	4	3
21	(France) Ugo Blanchet	6	6

Qualifying competition
(United States) Christopher Eubanks	4	4
21	(France) Ugo Blanchet	6	6

==== Seventh qualifier ====
First round
7	(Australia) Tristan Schoolkate	3	7^{7}	6
(Australia) James McCabe	6	6^{1}	2
(Kazakhstan) Beibit Zhukayev	7^{7}	7^{7}
19	(United States) Colton Smith	6^{3}	6^{5}

Qualifying competition
7	(Australia) Tristan Schoolkate	6	7^{7}
(Kazakhstan) Beibit Zhukayev	3	6^{5}

==== Eighth qualifier ====
First round
8	(Georgia (country)) Nikoloz Basilashvili	4	6	6
(Australia) Bernard Tomic	6	3	1
WC	(China) Xiao Linang	4	1
17	(United States) Eliot Spizzirri	6	6

Qualifying competition
8	(Georgia (country)) Nikoloz Basilashvili	6	6
17	(United States) Eliot Spizzirri	4	4

==== Ninth qualifier ====
First round
9	(Japan) Shintaro Mochizuki	3	5
(Germany) Yannick Hanfmann	6	7
(Australia) Jason Kubler	7^{7}	6
24	(Hong Kong) Coleman Wong	6^{4}	3

Qualifying competition
(Germany) Yannick Hanfmann	6	6
(Australia) Jason Kubler	2	3

==== Tenth qualifier ====
First round
10	(United States) Nishesh Basavareddy	7^{9}	4	2
(Monaco) Valentin Vacherot	6^{7}	6	6
(France) Kyrian Jacquet	4	7^{7}	6^{5}
14	(Canada) Liam Draxl	6	6^{1}	7^{7}

Qualifying competition
(Monaco) Valentin Vacherot	4	7^{7}	6
14	(Canada) Liam Draxl	6	6^{5}	4

==== Eleventh qualifier ====
First round
11	(Australia) James Duckworth	6^{0}	5
Alt	(Belgium) Gauthier Onclin	7^{7}	7
(Denmark) August Holmgren	4	7	6
16	(Chinese Taipei) Tseng Chun-hsin	6	5	3

Qualifying competition
Alt	(Belgium) Gauthier Onclin	4	6^{3}
(Denmark) August Holmgren	6	7^{7}

==== Twelfth qualifier ====
First round
12	(Australia) Rinky Hijikata	6	6
PR	(Italy) Stefano Napolitano	3	2
(Japan) James Trotter	5	6	6
15	(United States) Tristan Boyer	7	4	2

Qualifying competition
12	(Australia) Rinky Hijikata	3	7	4
(Japan) James Trotter	6	5	6
