= 2025 Rolex Shanghai Masters =

- Date: 1–12 October 2025
- Edition: 14th
- Category: ATP 1000
- Surface: Hard / outdoor
- Location: Shanghai, China
- Venue: Qizhong Forest Sports City Arena

Champions

Singles
- (Monaco) Valentin Vacherot

Doubles
- (Germany) Kevin Krawietz / (Germany) Tim Pütz
- Shanghai Masters

The 2025 Rolex Shanghai Masters was a tennis tournament played on outdoor hard courts. It was the 14th edition of the Shanghai Masters and was classified as an ATP Masters 1000 event on the 2025 ATP Tour. It took place at Qizhong Forest Sports City Arena in Shanghai, China from 1 to 12 October 2025.

The tournament was criticized for the heat, with Holger Rune calling the temperatures of more than 30°C and humidity of over 80 percent "brutal" and Novak Djokovic saying it was "very challenging physically", vomiting and dropping to the court frequently. Spectators used fans and cool packs.

== Champions ==
=== Singles ===
- (Monaco) Valentin Vacherot def. (France) Arthur Rinderknech, 4–6, 6–3, 6–3

=== Doubles ===
- (Germany) Kevin Krawietz / (Germany) Tim Pütz def. (Sweden) André Göransson / (United States) Alex Michelsen, 6–4, 6–4
