= Valentin Vacherot =

Monégasque tennis player (born 1998)

- Vacherot at the 2026 Swiss Indoors Basel
- Country (sports): Monaco (2022–present); France (–2022)
- Born: 16 November 1998 (age 28) Roquebrune-Cap-Martin, France
- Height: 1.93 m (6 ft 4 in)
- Turned pro: 2021
- Plays: Right-handed (two-handed backhand)
- College: Texas A&M University
- Coach: Benjamin Balleret
- Prize money: US $5,249,828

Singles
- Career record: 50–29
- Career titles: 2
- Highest ranking: No. 14 (5 October 2026)
- Current ranking: No. 27 (9 November 2026)

Grand Slam singles results
- Australian Open: 3R (2026)
- French Open: 2R (2026)
- Wimbledon: Q1 (2025)
- US Open: 3R (2026)

Doubles
- Career record: 7–9
- Career titles: 0
- Highest ranking: No. 104 (4 May 2026)
- Current ranking: No. 111 (2 November 2026)

Grand Slam doubles results
- Australian Open: 1R (2026)

Grand Slam mixed doubles results
- US Open: Q1 (2026)

Team competitions
- Davis Cup: 14–3
- Last updated on: 2 November 2026.

Valentin Vacherot (French: [valɑ̃tɛ̃ vaʃʁo]; born 16 November 1998) is a Monégasque professional tennis player. He has been ranked as high as world No. 14 in singles by the ATP, achieved in October 2026, making him the highest-ranked Monégasque singles player in history. He is the current No. 1 Monégasque singles player.

Vacherot has won two ATP Tour singles titles, including a Masters 1000 event at the 2025 Shanghai Masters. There, he became the first player from his nation to win an ATP Tour singles title as well as the lowest-ranked Masters 1000 champion in history (since 1990). He is the first Monégasque player to reach the top 20 and above in singles.

Vacherot also has a best doubles ranking of No. 104, achieved in May 2026. He played college tennis at Texas A&M. He represents Monaco at the Davis Cup, where he has a win–loss record of 14–3.

Vacherot is coached professionally by his elder half-brother, Benjamin Balleret. Tennis runs in Vacherot's family, as his mother is a tennis coach in Monaco. Other notable tennis players in his family include his cousins Arthur Rinderknech and Chloé Paquet, as well as his aunt Virginie Paquet.

== Early life ==
Vacherot was born in Roquebrune-Cap-Martin to parents Josse and Nadine Vacherot. He has three siblings. He holds dual French and Monégasque citizenship, having gone to school in and frequently visited Monaco; he therefore opted to represent them internationally in 2022.

== Professional career ==
=== 2022: First Challenger title ===
In 2022, Vacherot won his first Challenger title at the Nonthaburi Challenger, Thailand, beating Lý Hoàng Nam in the final. Vacherot became Monaco’s second Challenger champion and the first since Jean-René Lisnard in 2004.

=== 2023: Masters debut ===
Vacherot received a wildcard for the 2023 Monte-Carlo Masters main draw, making his Masters debut. He lost in the first round to Luca Nardi.

=== 2024: Grand Slam and top 110 debuts ===
Vacherot received a wildcard for the 2024 Monte-Carlo Masters, losing to ninth seed Grigor Dimitrov. Ranked No. 136, he qualified for the main draw at the 2024 Țiriac Open but lost his opening match to eventual champion Márton Fucsovics. Vacherot reached the top 120 on 6 May 2024, following a semifinal appearance as a qualifier, at the 2024 Open Aix Provence., losing to eventual champion Alejandro Tabilo.

Vacherot made his Grand Slam debut at the 2024 French Open after qualifying, becoming the first player from the Monégasque Tennis Federation to qualify for the main draw. He lost in the first round to Alejandro Davidovich Fokina.

=== 2025: Historic Masters title and top 30 ===
Vacherot also received a wildcard for the 2025 Monte-Carlo Masters and recorded his first Masters win over Jan-Lennard Struff in straight sets. He became the first Monégasque player to win a main draw match at the tournament since Jean-René Lisnard in 2009.

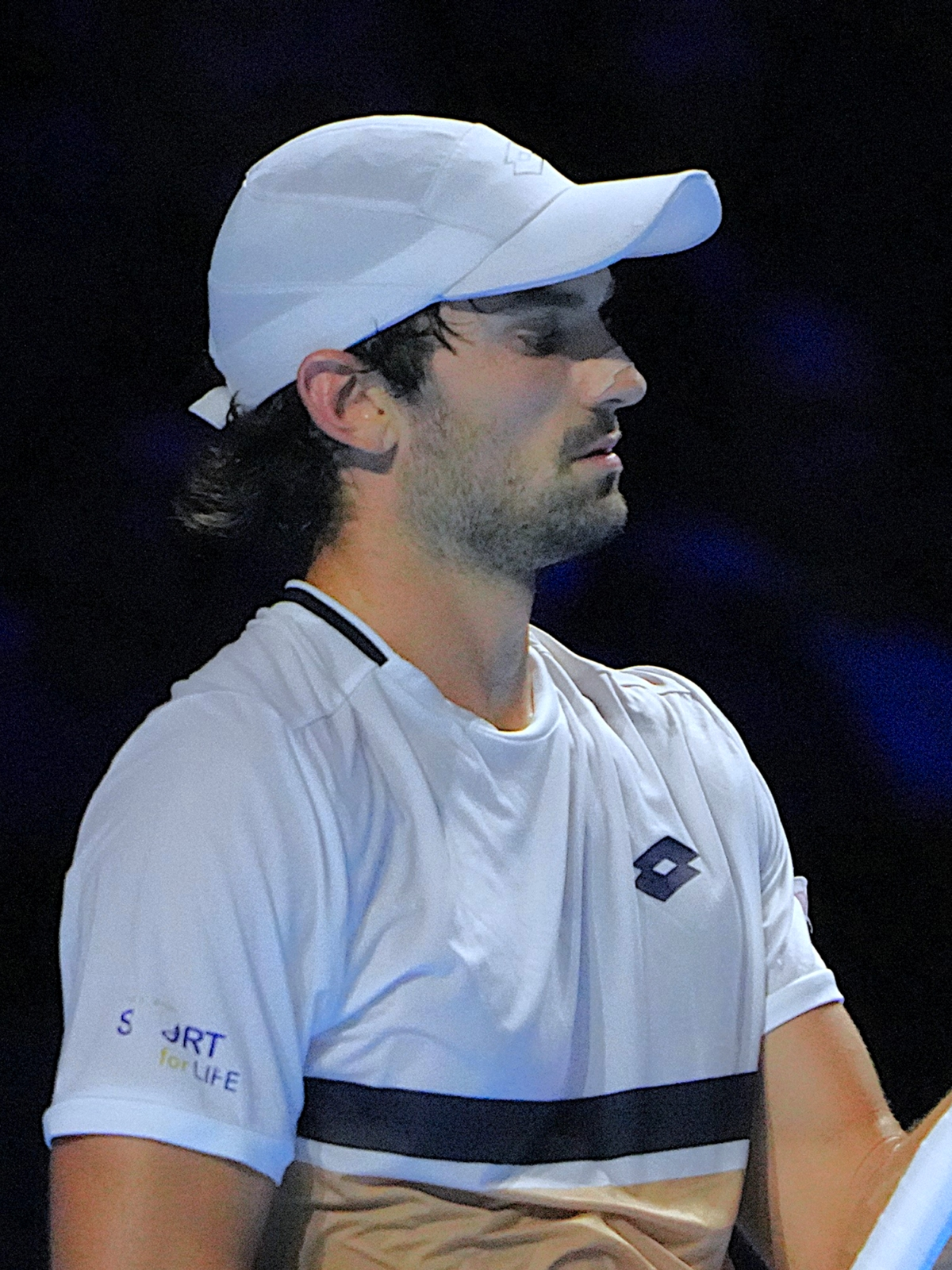
Vacherot at the 2025 Swiss Indoors

In October, ranked No. 204, Vacherot won his first title at the 2025 Rolex Shanghai Masters as a qualifier, becoming the lowest ranked player to win a Masters 1000 tournament. After qualifying, he recorded his second and third Masters wins by defeating Laslo Djere in straight sets and then Alexander Bublik in the second round. Vacherot reached his first Masters 1000 fourth round following the retirement of 20th seed Tomáš Macháč. He then upset Tallon Griekspoor to reach his first Masters quarterfinal and thus became the lowest-ranked quarterfinalist in the event history in Shanghai, and the first player from Monaco to reach an ATP Tour and Masters-level quarterfinal at the same time. Next he defeated Holger Rune in the quarterfinals. Vacherot defeated Novak Djokovic in the semifinals, recording the first top 10 (and top 5) win for a Monégasque player in history, and becoming the lowest ranked player to reach a Masters 1000 final. In Vacherot’s 27th tour-level match, he defeated his cousin Arthur Rinderknech to win his first ATP Tour and Masters 1000 title. Going into the Shanghai final, Vacherot and Rinderknech had each won 3 matches after dropping the first set and collectively the cousins defeated 10 of the 32 seeds (5 each) in the draw.

Vacherot received a wildcard for the Swiss Open in Basel, but lost to Taylor Fritz, and he also received a wildcard for the Paris Masters and reached the quarterfinals. Vacherot reached a new career-high ranking in the top 30 on 3 November 2025.

=== 2026: Major third round, top 15 and his second ATP title ===
In 2026, Vacherot continued his impressive ascent on the ATP Tour. He made his debut at the 2026 Australian Open, where he was seeded for the first time and recorded his first major match wins to reach the third round. In February, he reached the quarterfinals at the Dubai Tennis Championships, securing a victory over Ugo Humbert. In April, he made a standout Masters 1000 run by reaching the semifinals of the Monte-Carlo Masters as an unseeded player, with wins over Lorenzo Musetti, Hubert Hurkacz, and Alex de Minaur before falling to Carlos Alcaraz. He followed this by reaching the third round of the French Open and later reached the semifinals at the Japan Open in Tokyo, defeating Stefanos Tsitsipas and Arthur Fils. These strong results propelled him to a new career-high ranking of world No. 14 on 5 October 2026.

However, the late-season brought challenges, highlighted by a third-round defeat as the defending champion at the Shanghai Masters against Tommy Paul.

Vacherot quickly bounced back from this setback in November, winning the second ATP title of his career—and his first at the ATP 500 level—at the Swiss Indoors, where he defeated Jiří Lehečka 2–6, 6–3, 6–3 in the final after recovering from a set down. During his stellar title run in Basel, he secured consecutive victories over Rafael Jódar, Holger Rune, and Taylor Fritz.

== Performance timeline ==
Key
W	F	SF	QF	#R	RR	Q#	DNQ	A	NH

(W) winner; (F) finalist; (SF) semifinalist; (QF) quarterfinalist; (#R) rounds 4, 3, 2, 1; (RR) round-robin stage; (Q#) qualification round; (DNQ) did not qualify; (A) absent; (NH) not held; (SR) strike rate (events won / competed); (W–L) win–loss record.
To avoid confusion and double counting, these charts are updated at the conclusion of a tournament or when the player's participation has ended.

=== Singles ===
Tournament	2021	2022	2023	2024	2025	2026	SR	W–L	Win %
Grand Slam tournaments
Australian Open	A	A	A	A	Q2	3R	0 / 1	2–1	67%
French Open	A	A	A	1R	Q2	2R	0 / 2	1–1	50%
Wimbledon	A	A	A	A	Q1	A	0 / 0	0–0	–
US Open	A	A	A	Q2	A	3R	0 / 1	2–1	67%
Win–loss	0–0	0–0	0–0	0–1	0–0	5–2	0 / 4	5–3	63%
National representation
Davis Cup	A	G2	G2	G2	G2	G1	0 / 0	14–3	82%
ATP 1000 tournaments
Indian Wells Open	A	A	A	A	A	3R	0 / 1	1–1	50%
Miami Open	A	A	A	Q2	A	4R	0 / 1	2–1	67%
Monte-Carlo Masters	A	Q1	1R	1R	2R	SF	0 / 4	5–4	56%
Madrid Open	A	A	A	Q2	A	2R	0 / 1	0–1	0%
Italian Open	A	A	A	Q1	A	A	0 / 0	0–0	–
Canadian Open	A	A	A	A	A	2R	0 / 1	0–1	0%
Cincinnati Open	A	A	A	A	A	2R	0 / 1	0–1	0%
Shanghai Masters	NH		A	A	W	3R	1 / 2	8–1	89%
Paris Masters	A	A	A	A	QF	1R	0 / 2	3–2	60%
Win–loss	0–0	0–0	0–1	0–1	11–2	7–7	1 / 13	19–12	61%
Career statistics
Tournaments	0	0	1	3	5	17	26		
Titles	0	0	0	0	1	1	1		
Finals	0	0	0	0	1	1	1		
Overall win–loss	0–0	2–1	2–3	2–3	15–4	29-18	1 / 26	44–27	62%
Year-end ranking	574	290	280	140	31		$4,097,273		

== ATP Masters 1000 finals ==
=== Singles: 1 (title) ===
Result	Year	Tournament	Surface	Opponent	Score
Win	2025	Shanghai Masters	Hard	(France) Arthur Rinderknech	4–6, 6–3, 6–3

=== Doubles: 1 (runner-up) ===
Result	Year	Tournament	Surface	Partner	Opponents	Score
Loss	2026	Indian Wells Open	Hard	(France) Arthur Rinderknech	(Argentina) Guido Andreozzi (France) Manuel Guinard	6–7^{(3–7)}, 3–6

== ATP Tour finals ==
=== Singles: 2 (2 titles) ===
Legend ATP 1000 (1–0) ATP 500 (1–0)	Finals by surface Hard (2–0)	Finals by setting Outdoor (1–0) Indoor (1–0)

Result	W–L	Date	Tournament	Tier	Surface	Opponent	Score
Win	1–0	Oct 2025	Shanghai Masters, China	ATP 1000	Hard	(France) Arthur Rinderknech	4–6, 6–3, 6–3
Win	2–0	Oct 2026	Swiss Indoors, Switzerland	ATP 500	Hard (i)	(Czech Republic) Jiří Lehečka	2–6, 6–3, 6–3

=== Doubles: 1 (runner-up) ===
Legend ATP 1000 (0–1)	Finals by surface Hard (0–1)	Finals by setting Outdoor (0–1)

Result	W–L	Date	Tournament	Tier	Surface	Partner	Opponents	Score
Loss	0–1	Mar 2026	Indian Wells Open, US	ATP 1000	Hard	(France) Arthur Rinderknech	(Argentina) Guido Andreozzi (France) Manuel Guinard	6–7^{(3–7)}, 3–6

== ATP Challenger Tour finals ==
=== Singles: 5 (4 titles, 1 runner-up) ===
Legend ATP Challenger (4–1)	Finals by surface Hard (4–0) Clay (0–1)

Result	W–L	Date	Tournament	Surface	Opponent	Score
Win	1–0	Aug 2022	Nonthaburi Challenger, Thailand	Hard	(Vietnam) Lý Hoàng Nam	6–3, 7–6^{(7–4)}
Win	2–0	Jan 2024	Nonthaburi Challenger, Thailand (2)	Hard	(France) Lucas Pouille	3–2 ret.
Win	3–0	Jan 2024	Nonthaburi Challenger II, Thailand	Hard	(France) Manuel Guinard	7–5, 7–6^{(7–4)}
Win	4–0	Feb 2024	Pune Challenger, India	Hard	(Australia) Adam Walton	3–6, 7–6^{(7–5)}, 7–6^{(7–5)}
Loss	4–1	May 2025	Abruzzo Open, Italy	Clay	(Italy) Francesco Maestrelli	4–6, 4–6

=== Doubles: 1 (title) ===
Legend ATP Challenger (1–0)

Result	W–L	Date	Tournament	Surface	Partner	Opponents	Score
Win	1–1	Oct 2022	Tiburon Challenger, US	Hard	(Switzerland) Leandro Riedi	(United States) Ezekiel Clark (United States) Alfredo Perez	6–7^{(2–7)}, 6–3, [10–2]

== ITF Tour finals ==
=== Singles: 13 (7 titles, 6 runner-ups) ===
Legend ITF Futures/World Tennis (7–6)	Finals by surface Hard (4–3) Clay (3–3)

Result	W–L	Date	Tournament	Surface	Opponent	Score
Loss	0–1	Sep 2016	Tunisia F24, Hammamet	Clay	(Argentina) Franco Agamenone	0–6, 1–6
Win	1–1	Jul 2021	M15 Monastir, Tunisia	Hard	(United States) Omni Kumar	6–4, 6–4
Loss	1–2	Jul 2021	M15 Monastir, Tunisia	Hard	(Australia) Rinky Hijikata	3–6, 1–6
Loss	1–3	Oct 2021	M15 Doha, Qatar	Hard	(Netherlands) Alec Deckers	4–6, 6–3, 3–6
Loss	1–4	Oct 2021	M15 Monastir, Tunisia	Hard	(Australia) Moerani Bouzige	4–6, 5–7
Win	2–4	Nov 2021	M15 New Delhi, India	Hard	(Australia) Philip Sekulic	5–7, 6–2, 7–6^{(7–3)}
Win	3–4	Jan 2022	M15 Monastir, Tunisia	Hard	(Belgium) Raphaël Collignon	6–3, 6–4
Win	4–4	Mar 2022	M25 Quinta do Lago, Portugal	Hard	(Chinese Taipei) Hsu Yu-hsiou	6–4, 6–3
Win	5–4	Jul 2022	M15 Kottingbrunn, Austria	Clay	(Netherlands) Max Houkes	6–3, 6–4
Win	6–4	Jun 2023	M25 Montauban, France	Clay	(France) Titouan Droguet	6–4, 2–6, 7–6^{(7–4)}
Win	7–4	Jul 2023	M25 Bourg-en-Bresse, France	Clay	(France) Tristan Lamasine	6–1, 2–6, 7–5
Loss	7–5	Aug 2023	M25 Ystad, Sweden	Clay	(Germany) Marvin Möller	6–2, 3–6, 5–7
Loss	7–6	Oct 2023	M25 Zlatibor, Serbia	Clay	(Czech Republic) Andrew Paulson	3–6, 7–5, 3–6

== Record against top-10 players ==
- Vacherot's match record against players who have been ranked in the Top 10, with those who are active in boldface.

Only ATP Tour (incl. Grand Slams) main draw and Davis Cup matches are considered.

Opponent	Highest ranking	Matches	Won	Lost	Win %	Last match
**Number 1 ranked players**
(Spain) **Carlos Alcaraz**	1	1	0	1	0%	Lost (4–6, 4–6) at 2026 Monte Carlo SF
(Serbia) **Novak Djokovic**	1	1	1	0	100%	Won (6–3, 6–4) at 2025 Shanghai SF
Number 2 ranked players
(Norway) **Casper Ruud**	2	1	0	1	0%	Lost (6–3, 3–6, 4–6) at 2026 Indian Wells 3R
Number 3 ranked players
(Bulgaria) **Grigor Dimitrov**	3	2	0	2	0%	Lost (6–4, 3–6, 1–6) at 2025 Monte Carlo 2R
(Greece) **Stefanos Tsitsipas**	3	1	1	0	100%	Won (4–6, 7–6^{(7–5)}, 6–4) at 2026 Tokyo 2R
Number 4 ranked players
(Canada) **Félix Auger-Aliassime**	4	1	0	1	0%	Lost (2–6, 2–6) at 2025 Paris Masters QF
(United States) **Taylor Fritz**	4	1	0	1	0%	Lost (6–4, 6–7^{(4–7)}. 5–7) at 2025 Basel 1R
(Denmark) **Holger Rune**	4	1	1	0	100%	Won (2–6, 7–6^{(7–4)}, 6–4) at 2025 Shanghai QF
(United States) **Ben Shelton**	4	1	0	1	0%	Lost (4–6, 4–6, 6–7^{(5–7)}) at 2026 Australian Open 3R
Number 5 ranked players
(Australia) **Alex de Minaur**	5	1	1	0	100%	Won (6–4, 3–6, 6–3) at 2026 Monte Carlo QF
(Italy) **Lorenzo Musetti**	5	1	1	0	100%	Won (7–6^{(8–6)}. 7–5) at 2026 Monte Carlo 2R
Number 6 ranked players
(Italy) **Matteo Berrettini**	6	1	1	0	100%	Won (7–6^{(7–5)}, 6–4) at 2026 Miami 3R
(Poland) **Hubert Hurkacz**	6	1	1	0	100%	Won (6–7^{(7–9)}, 6–3, 6–4) at 2026 Monte Carlo 3R
(France) **Gaël Monfils**	6	1	1	0	100%	Won (6–3, 6–3) at 2026 Acapulco QF
Number 8 ranked players
(United Kingdom) **Cameron Norrie**	8	1	1	0	100%	Won (7–6^{(7–4)}, 6–4) at 2025 Paris Masters 3R
(United States) **Frances Tiafoe**	8	1	0	1	0%	Lost (4–6, 2–6, 4–6) at 2026 US Open 3R
Number 9 ranked players
(France) **Arthur Fils**	9	2	1	1	50%	Won (7–5, 4–6, 6–4) at 2026 Tokyo QF
Number 10 ranked players
(Kazakhstan) **Alexander Bublik**	10	2	2	0	100%	Won (7–6^{(7–4)}, 7–6^{(8–6)}) at 2026 Davis Cup Playoffs RR
Total		21	12	9	57%	* Statistics correct as of 4 October 2026

== Wins over top-10 players ==
- Vacherot has a 5–5 (100%) match record against players who were, at the time the match was played, ranked in the top 10.

Season	2024	2025	2026	Total
Wins	0	1	4	5

#	Player	Rk	Event	Surface	Rd	Score	Rk	Ref
2025
1.	(Serbia) Novak Djokovic	5	Shanghai Masters, China	Hard	SF	6–3, 6–4	204	
2026
2.	(Kazakhstan) Alexander Bublik	10	Davis Cup, Astana, Kazakhstan	Hard (i)	WG1	7–6^{(7–4)}, 7–6^{(9–7)}	27	
3.	(Italy) Lorenzo Musetti	5	Monte-Carlo Masters, France	Clay	2R	7–6^{(8–6)}, 7–5	23	
4.	(Australia) Alex de Minaur	6	Monte-Carlo Masters, France	Clay	QF	6–4, 3–6, 6–3	23	
5.	(France) Arthur Fils	9	Japan Open, Japan	Hard	QF	7–5, 4–6, 6–4	19	

- Key: (Rk) first use, opponent rank; (Rd) round; (Rk) 2nd use, player rank; (Ref) reference; (F) final; (SF) semifinal; (QF) quarterfinal; (#R) rounds 4, 3, 2, 1; (RR) round-robin stage; (Q#) qualifying rounds or stages (3), 2, 1.

*As of 10 April 2026

== Exhibition matches ==
=== Singles ===
Result	Date	Tournament	Surface	Opponent	Score
Loss	Dec 2025	World Tennis Continental Cup, Shenzhen, China	Hard (i)	Andrey Rublev	6–2, 6–7^{(5–7)}, [7–10]
Win	Dec 2025	World Tennis Continental Cup, Shenzhen, China	Hard (i)	(China) Zhang Zhizhen	6–3, 7–6^{(7–3)}

=== Mixed doubles ===
Result	Date	Tournament	Surface	Partner	Opponents	Score
Loss	Dec 2025	World Tennis Continental Cup, Shenzhen, China	Hard (i)	(Poland) Iga Świątek	Andrey Rublev (Kazakhstan) Elena Rybakina	4–6, 4–6

=== Team competitions ===
Result	Date	Tournament	Surface	Team	Partner(s)	Opp. team	Opponent players	Score
Loss	Dec 2025	World Tennis Continental Cup, Shenzhen, China	Hard (i)	Europe Team	Flavio Cobolli; Iga Świątek; Belinda Bencic	World Team	Andrey Rublev; Zhang Zhizhen; Elena Rybakina; Wang Xinyu	7–15

Sporting positions
Preceded by (Portugal) Nuno Borges	SEC Tennis Player of the Year; 2021	Succeeded by (United States) Ben Shelton

Awards
Preceded by Inaugural	ATP Breakthrough of the Year; 2025	Succeeded by Incumbent
