= 2019 Internazionali di Tennis d'Abruzzo – Singles =

Singles
- 2019 Internazionali di Tennis d'Abruzzo

Final
- Champion: (Italy) Stefano Travaglia
- Runner-up: (Germany) Oscar Otte
- Score: 6–3, 6–7^{(3–7)}, 6–3

Events
Singles	Doubles
← 2018 ·	Internazionali di Tennis d'Abruzzo	· 2022 →

Gianluigi Quinzi was the defending champion but lost in the second round to Tomislav Brkić.

Stefano Travaglia won the title after defeating Oscar Otte 6–3, 6–7^{(3–7)}, 6–3 in the final.

== Seeds ==
All seeds receive a bye into the second round.

1. (Germany) Maximilian Marterer (semifinals, retired)
2. (Italy) Gianluigi Quinzi (second round)
3. (Germany) Oscar Otte (final)
4. (Italy) Salvatore Caruso (second round)
5. (Italy) Stefano Travaglia (champion)
6. (France) Quentin Halys (second round)
7. (Germany) Rudolf Molleker (quarterfinals)
8. (Sweden) Mikael Ymer (quarterfinals)
9. (Belgium) Arthur De Greef (withdrew)
10. (Belgium) Kimmer Coppejans (third round)
11. (Germany) Dominik Köpfer (second round)
12. (Netherlands) Tallon Griekspoor (second round)
13. (Austria) Jurij Rodionov (second round)
14. (Croatia) Viktor Galović (second round)
15. (Italy) Matteo Donati (second round, retired)
16. (Argentina) Facundo Argüello (second round)

== Draw ==
=== Key ===
- Q = Qualifier
- WC = Wild card
- LL = Lucky loser
- Alt = Alternate
- SE = Special exempt
- PR = Protected ranking
- ITF = ITF entry
- JE = Junior exempt
- w/o = Walkover
- r = Retired
- d = Defaulted
- SR = Special ranking

=== Finals ===
Quarterfinals
1	(Germany) Maximilian Marterer	6	6
8	(Sweden) Mikael Ymer	4	4
3	(Germany) Oscar Otte	6	6
7	(Germany) Rudolf Molleker	4	4
5	(Italy) Stefano Travaglia	6^{4}	6	7^{8}
(Italy) Federico Gaio	7^{7}	4	6^{6}
(Slovakia) Norbert Gombos	6	6
(Bosnia and Herzegovina) Tomislav Brkić	4	1

Semifinals
1	(Germany) Maximilian Marterer	1	1^{r}
3	(Germany) Oscar Otte	6	4
5	(Italy) Stefano Travaglia	6	6
(Slovakia) Norbert Gombos	3	4

Final
3	(Germany) Oscar Otte	3	7^{7}	3
5	(Italy) Stefano Travaglia	6	6^{3}	6

=== Top half ===
==== Section 1 ====
First round
ITF	(Spain) D Pérez Sanz	4	6^{4}
(Portugal) G Elias	6	7^{7}
(Russia) A Vatutin	6	6
Q	(Vietnam) NH Lý	1	4
(Russia) P Kotov	6	6
(France) G Sakharov	4	2
(Italy) M Viola	6	6
(Spain) Carlos Boluda-Purkiss	3	2

Second round
1	(Germany) M Marterer	6^{4}	6	6
(Portugal) G Elias	7^{7}	3	3
(Russia) A Vatutin	4	6	6
14	(Croatia) V Galović	6	3	3
12	(Netherlands) T Griekspoor	7^{7}	4	4
(Russia) P Kotov	6^{5}	6	6
(Italy) M Viola	1	2
8	(Sweden) M Ymer	6	6

Third round
1	(Germany) M Marterer	2	6	6
(Russia) A Vatutin	6	3	1
(Russia) P Kotov	6	5	5
8	(Sweden) M Ymer	0	7	7

Quarterfinals
1	(Germany) M Marterer	6	6
8	(Sweden) M Ymer	4	4

==== Section 2 ====
First round
Alt	(France) A Escoffier	2	3
(Spain) B Zapata Miralles	6	6
(Bosnia and Herzegovina) A Šetkić	1	2
(Brazil) T Bellucci	6	6
(Italy) GM Moroni	6	6
ITF	(Russia) I Nedelko	3	2
WC	(Italy) J Ocleppo	6	3	6
(France) J Tatlot	3	6	2

Second round
3	(Germany) O Otte	6	6
(Spain) B Zapata Miralles	1	4
(Brazil) T Bellucci	7^{7}	6
16	(Argentina) F Argüello	6^{4}	2
LL	(Italy) Andrea Del Federico	1	2
(Italy) GM Moroni	6	6
WC	(Italy) J Ocleppo	4	6	4
7	(Germany) R Molleker	6	3	6

Third round
3	(Germany) O Otte	4
(Brazil) T Bellucci	3^{r}
(Italy) GM Moroni	6	2	0
7	(Germany) R Molleker	3	6	6

Quarterfinals
3	(Germany) O Otte	6	6
7	(Germany) R Molleker	4	4

=== Bottom half ===
==== Section 3 ====
First round
(Italy) A Pellegrino	3	6	6
Q	(Italy) A Vavassori	6	1	2
ITF	(Spain) J Barranco Cosano	1	3
WC	(Italy) G Zeppieri	6	6
(Italy) A Basso	5	6	3
(Dominican Republic) J Hernández-Fernández	7	4	6
(France) E Couacaud	6^{6}	6	0
(Italy) F Gaio	7^{8}	4	6

Second round
5	(Italy) S Travaglia	7^{7}	6
(Italy) A Pellegrino	6^{5}	3
WC	(Italy) G Zeppieri	6	4	6
11	(Germany) D Köpfer	4	6	3
13	(Austria) J Rodionov	6^{7}	2
(Dominican Republic) J Hernández-Fernández	7^{9}	6
(Italy) F Gaio	6	7
4	(Italy) S Caruso	1	5

Third round
5	(Italy) S Travaglia	6	2
WC	(Italy) G Zeppieri	2	0^{r}
(Dominican Republic) J Hernández-Fernández	6^{4}	6	1
(Italy) F Gaio	7^{7}	0	6

Quarterfinals
5	(Italy) S Travaglia	6^{4}	6	7^{8}
(Italy) F Gaio	7^{7}	4	6^{6}

==== Section 4 ====
First round
(Belgium) S Darcis	6	2	3
(Slovakia) N Gombos	4	6	6
ITF	(Italy) R Bonadio	7	3	6
WC	(Italy) J Berrettini	5	6	3
WC	(Italy) Gianluca Di Nicola	3	6	4
WC	(Italy) L Musetti	6	3	6
ITF	(Italy) R Brancaccio	6	1	2
(Bosnia and Herzegovina) T Brkić	2	6	6

Second round
6	(France) Q Halys	2	2
(Slovakia) N Gombos	6	6
ITF	(Italy) R Bonadio	6	6^{4}	5
10	(Belgium) K Coppejans	4	7^{7}	7
15	(Italy) M Donati	4	0^{r}
WC	(Italy) L Musetti	6	0
(Bosnia and Herzegovina) T Brkić	6	6
2	(Italy) G Quinzi	3	0

Third round
(Slovakia) N Gombos	6	7
10	(Belgium) K Coppejans	4	5
WC	(Italy) L Musetti	5	3
(Bosnia and Herzegovina) T Brkić	7	6

Quarterfinals
(Slovakia) N Gombos	6	6
(Bosnia and Herzegovina) T Brkić	4	1
