= 2019 Internazionali di Tennis d'Abruzzo – Doubles =

Doubles
- 2019 Internazionali di Tennis d'Abruzzo

Final
- Champions: (Ukraine) Denys Molchanov (Slovakia) Igor Zelenay
- Runners-up: (Argentina) Guillermo Durán (Spain) David Vega Hernández
- Score: 6–3, 6–2

Events
Singles	Doubles
← 2018 ·	Internazionali di Tennis d'Abruzzo	· 2022 →

Julian Ocleppo and Andrea Vavassori were the defending champions but lost in the first round to Jonathan Eysseric and Andrei Vasilevski.

Denys Molchanov and Igor Zelenay won the title after defeating Guillermo Durán and David Vega Hernández 6–3, 6–2 in the final.

== Seeds ==
1. (Ukraine) Denys Molchanov / (Slovakia) Igor Zelenay (champions)
2. (Argentina) Guillermo Durán / (Spain) David Vega Hernández (final)
3. (Austria) Philipp Oswald / (Slovakia) Filip Polášek (semifinals)
4. (France) Jonathan Eysseric / (Belarus) Andrei Vasilevski (quarterfinals)

== Draw ==
=== Key ===
- Q = Qualifier
- WC = Wild card
- LL = Lucky loser
- Alt = Alternate
- SE = Special exempt
- PR = Protected ranking
- ITF = ITF entry
- JE = Junior exempt
- w/o = Walkover
- r = Retired
- d = Defaulted
- SR = Special ranking

First round
(Belgium) K Coppejans (Belgium) S Gillé	6	6^{5}	[9]
(France) E Couacaud (Germany) R Molleker	4	7^{7}	[11]
3	(Austria) P Oswald (Slovakia) F Polášek	w/o
ITF	(Italy) R Bonadio (Spain) D Pérez Sanz
WC	(Italy) Andrea Del Federico (Italy) S Travaglia	w/o
(France) Q Halys (France) G Sakharov
WC	(Italy) Alessio De Bernardis (Italy) Giuseppe Tresca	2	1
(Bosnia and Herzegovina) T Brkić (Serbia) N Čačić	6	6
(Italy) J Ocleppo (Italy) A Vavassori	6	3	[5]
4	(France) J Eysseric (Belarus) A Vasilevski	3	6	[10]
ITF	(Spain) J Barranco Cosano (Italy) R Brancaccio	4	1
WC	(Italy) L Musetti (Italy) G Zeppieri	6	0^{r}
(Croatia) V Galović (Italy) A Pellegrino	0	6	[9]
2	(Argentina) G Durán (Spain) D Vega Hernández	6	4	[11]

Quarterfinals
1	(Ukraine) D Molchanov (Slovakia) I Zelenay	6	6
(France) E Couacaud (Germany) R Molleker	3	3
3	(Austria) P Oswald (Slovakia) F Polášek	6	6
WC	(Italy) A Del Federico (Italy) S Travaglia	3	3
(Bosnia and Herzegovina) T Brkić (Serbia) N Čačić	6	7^{7}
4	(France) J Eysseric (Belarus) A Vasilevski	4	6^{3}
ITF	(Spain) J Barranco Cosano (Italy) R Brancaccio	3	1^{r}
2	(Argentina) G Durán (Spain) D Vega Hernández	6	4

Semifinals
1	(Ukraine) D Molchanov (Slovakia) I Zelenay	6	6
3	(Austria) P Oswald (Slovakia) F Polášek	3	1
(Bosnia and Herzegovina) T Brkić (Serbia) N Čačić	3	6^{4}
2	(Argentina) G Durán (Spain) D Vega Hernández	6	7^{7}

Final
1	(Ukraine) D Molchanov (Slovakia) I Zelenay	6	6
2	(Argentina) G Durán (Spain) D Vega Hernández	3	2
