= 2022 Internazionali di Tennis d'Abruzzo =

- Date: 16–22 May
- Edition: 4th
- Surface: Clay
- Location: Francavilla al Mare, Italy

Champions

Singles
- (Italy) Matteo Arnaldi

Doubles
- (France) Dan Added / (Argentina) Hernán Casanova
← 2019 ·	Internazionali di Tennis d'Abruzzo	· 2023 →

The 2022 Internazionali di Tennis d'Abruzzo was a professional tennis tournament played on clay courts. It was the fourth edition of the tournament which was part of the 2022 ATP Challenger Tour. It took place in Francavilla al Mare, Italy between 16 and 22 May 2022.

== Singles main-draw entrants ==
=== Seeds ===
Country	Player	Rank^{1}	Seed
~~USA~~	~~Nicolas Moreno de Alboran~~	~~242~~	~~1~~
HUN	Máté Valkusz	264	2
BRA	Daniel Dutra da Silva	266	3
ITA	Matteo Arnaldi	275	4
CAN	Alexis Galarneau	300	5
ARG	Hernán Casanova	305	6
FRA	Mathias Bourgue	307	7
DOM	Nick Hardt	312	8
UKR	Oleksii Krutykh	314	9

- ^{1} Rankings are as of 9 May 2022.

=== Other entrants ===
The following players received wildcards into the singles main draw:

- (Italy) Matteo Arnaldi
- (Italy) Matteo Gigante
- (Italy) Francesco Maestrelli

The following players received entry into the singles main draw using protected rankings:

- (Germany) Jeremy Jahn
- (China) Wu Yibing

The following players received entry into the singles main draw as alternates:

- (Italy) Filippo Baldi
- (Italy) Giovanni Fonio

The following players received entry from the qualifying draw:

- (Poland) Paweł Ciaś
- (Italy) Davide Galoppini
- (Italy) Omar Giacalone
- (France) Harold Mayot
- (Italy) Gian Marco Ortenzi
- (France) Arthur Reymond

The following players received entry as lucky losers:

- (Italy) Riccardo Balzerani
- (Australia) Tristan Schoolkate

== Champions ==
=== Singles ===
- (Italy) Matteo Arnaldi def. (Italy) Francesco Maestrelli 6–3, 6–7^{(7–9)}, 6–4.

=== Doubles ===
- (France) Dan Added / (Argentina) Hernán Casanova def. (Italy) Davide Pozzi / (Italy) Augusto Virgili 6–3, 7–5.
