= 2023 Internazionali di Tennis d'Abruzzo – Singles =

Singles
- 2023 Internazionali di Tennis d'Abruzzo

Final
- Champion: (Chile) Alejandro Tabilo
- Runner-up: (France) Benoît Paire
- Score: 6–1, 7–5

Events
Singles	Doubles
- Internazionali di Tennis d'Abruzzo

Matteo Arnaldi was the defending champion but chose not to defend his title.

Alejandro Tabilo won the title after defeating Benoît Paire 6–1, 7–5 in the final.

== Seeds ==
1. (United Kingdom) Liam Broady (withdrew)
2. (Argentina) Thiago Agustín Tirante (quarterfinals)
3. (Chile) Alejandro Tabilo (champion)
4. (France) Benoît Paire (final)
5. (Belgium) Kimmer Coppejans (quarterfinals)
6. (Bulgaria) Dimitar Kuzmanov (second round)
7. (Romania) Nicholas David Ionel (semifinals)
8. (United States) Nicolas Moreno de Alboran (second round)
9. (Belgium) Raphaël Collignon (quarterfinals)

== Draw ==
Key

- Q = Qualifier
- WC = Wild card
- LL = Lucky loser
- Alt = Alternate
- ITF = ITF entry
- PR = Protected ranking
- SR = Special ranking
- SE = Special exempt
- JE = Junior exempt
- JR = Junior Accelerator Programme entrant
- CO = College Accelerator Programme entrant
- NG = Next Gen Accelerator Program entrant
- w/o = Walkover
- r = Retired
- d = Defaulted

=== Finals ===
Semifinals
(Italy) Lorenzo Giustino	3	2
4	(France) Benoît Paire	6	6
3	(Chile) Alejandro Tabilo	6	7^{8}
7	(Romania) Nicholas David Ionel	1	6^{6}

Final
4	(France) Benoît Paire	1	5
3	(Chile) Alejandro Tabilo	6	7

=== Top half ===
First round
9	(Belgium) R Collignon	6	6
(Mexico) R Pacheco Méndez	3	0
(Belgium) G Onclin	3	0
Q	(Italy) S Travaglia	6	6
(Italy) L Giustino	7	6
Alt	(Kazakhstan) M Kukushkin	5	1
(Czech Republic) D Svrčina	4	4
6	(Bulgaria) D Kuzmanov	6	6
4	(France) B Paire	3	6	7^{15}
WC	(Italy) Giorgio Tabacco	6	4	6^{13}
Alt	(Italy) A Giannessi	3	6	6
(Argentina) M Trungelliti	6	3	4
Alt	(Italy) G Mager	7^{7}	5	7^{8}
WC	(Italy) G Piraino	6^{2}	7	6^{6}
(Tunisia) A Dougaz	4	2
8	(United States) N Moreno de Alboran	6	6

Second round
9	(Belgium) R Collignon	6	6
Q	(Italy) S Travaglia	3	4
(Italy) L Giustino	1	7^{7}	6
6	(Bulgaria) D Kuzmanov	6	6^{1}	2
4	(France) B Paire	7	7
Alt	(Italy) A Giannessi	5	5
Alt	(Italy) G Mager	2	7^{11}	6
8	(United States) N Moreno de Alboran	6	6^{9}	1

Quarterfinals
9	(Belgium) R Collignon	6^{5}	2
(Italy) L Giustino	7^{7}	6
4	(France) B Paire	6	3	6
Alt	(Italy) G Mager	1	6	3

Semifinals
(Italy) L Giustino	3	2
4	(France) B Paire	6	6

=== Bottom half ===
First round
5	(Belgium) K Coppejans	5	6	6
(Argentina) R Olivo	7	1	4
Q	(Croatia) D Ajduković	6	6
Q	(Italy) A Arnaboldi	2	2
Alt	(Italy) S Caruso	6	1	6^{3}
Q	(Italy) G Fonio	3	6	7^{7}
(Portugal) F Ferreira Silva	5	3
3	(Chile) A Tabilo	7	6
7	(Romania) ND Ionel	6	6
(Colombia) N Mejía	4	4
Q	(Italy) Edoardo Lavagno	6	6
(Netherlands) J de Jong	0	4
Alt	(Germany) Elmar Ejupovic	6	6
Q	(Tunisia) M Echargui	2	6^{r}
WC	(Italy) Fausto Tabacco	1	6^{7}
2	(Argentina) TA Tirante	6	7^{9}

Second round
5	(Belgium) K Coppejans	6	6
Q	(Croatia) D Ajduković	3	2
Q	(Italy) G Fonio	4	6^{5}
3	(Chile) A Tabilo	6	7^{7}
7	(Romania) ND Ionel	6	6
Q	(Italy) E Lavagno	4	3
Alt	(Germany) E Ejupovic	3	2
2	(Argentina) TA Tirante	6	6

Quarterfinals
5	(Belgium) K Coppejans	2	2
3	(Chile) A Tabilo	6	6
7	(Romania) ND Ionel	6	3	6
2	(Argentina) TA Tirante	2	6	3

Semifinals
3	(Chile) A Tabilo	6	7^{8}
7	(Romania) ND Ionel	1	6^{6}
