= 2017 Internazionali di Tennis d'Abruzzo – Singles =

Singles
- 2017 Internazionali di Tennis d'Abruzzo

Final
- Champion: (Portugal) Pedro Sousa
- Runner-up: (Italy) Alessandro Giannessi
- Score: 6–3, 7–6^{(7–3)}

Events
Singles	Doubles
Internazionali di Tennis d'Abruzzo	· 2018 →

This was the first edition of the tournament.

Pedro Sousa won the title after defeating Alessandro Giannessi 6–3, 7–6^{(7–3)} in the final.

== Seeds ==
1. (Portugal) Gastão Elias (first round)
2. (Italy) Alessandro Giannessi (final)
3. (Kazakhstan) Alexander Bublik (second round)
4. (Italy) Marco Cecchinato (semifinals)
5. (Spain) Rubén Ramírez Hidalgo (quarterfinals, retired)
6. (Italy) Stefano Napolitano (second round)
7. (France) Constant Lestienne (second round)
8. (Italy) Lorenzo Giustino (second round)

== Draw ==
Key

- Q = Qualifier
- WC = Wild card
- LL = Lucky loser
- Alt = Alternate
- ITF = ITF entry
- PR = Protected ranking
- SR = Special ranking
- SE = Special exempt
- JE = Junior exempt
- JR = Junior Accelerator Programme entrant
- CO = College Accelerator Programme entrant
- NG = Next Gen Accelerator Program entrant
- w/o = Walkover
- r = Retired
- d = Defaulted

=== Finals ===
Semifinals
(Portugal) Pedro Sousa	6	6^{4}	6
4	(Italy) Marco Cecchinato	3	7^{7}	3
(Italy) Stefano Travaglia	7	4	2
2	(Italy) Alessandro Giannessi	5	6	6

Final
(Portugal) Pedro Sousa	6	7^{7}
2	(Italy) Alessandro Giannessi	3	6^{3}

=== Top half ===
First round
1	(Portugal) G Elias	6^{3}	6	3
(Croatia) K Mesaroš	7^{7}	4	6
(Portugal) P Sousa	7^{7}	6
(Lithuania) L Grigelis	6^{3}	4
(Italy) M Donati	4	7^{13}	7
WC	(Italy) S Bolelli	6	6^{11}	5
(Netherlands) I Sijsling	2	1
8	(Italy) L Giustino	6	6
4	(Italy) M Cecchinato	6	6
(Italy) S Caruso	3	1
WC	(Italy) A Pellegrino	6	5	0
Q	(Serbia) F Krajinović	3	7	6
(Brazil) G Clezar	7^{9}	1	3
WC	(Italy) M Berrettini	6^{7}	6	6
(France) T Lamasine	4	7	6^{7}
7	(France) C Lestienne	6	5	7^{9}

Second round
(Croatia) K Mesaroš	4	1
(Portugal) P Sousa	6	6
(Italy) M Donati	6	6^{3}	6
8	(Italy) L Giustino	2	7^{7}	0
4	(Italy) M Cecchinato	6	4	7^{7}
Q	(Serbia) F Krajinović	4	6	6^{2}
WC	(Italy) M Berrettini	6	6
7	(France) C Lestienne	3	3

Quarterfinals
(Portugal) P Sousa	6	6
(Italy) M Donati	4	4
4	(Italy) M Cecchinato	6^{4}	7^{7}	6
WC	(Italy) M Berrettini	7^{7}	6^{3}	3

Semifinals
(Portugal) P Sousa	6	6^{4}	6
4	(Italy) M Cecchinato	3	7^{7}	3

=== Bottom half ===
First round
6	(Italy) S Napolitano	6	1	6
(Germany) Marc Sieber	4	6	4
(Italy) R Bellotti	5	2
(Italy) S Travaglia	7	6
(Czech Republic) V Šafránek	4	6	6
Q	(Austria) S Ofner	6	3	1
(Germany) Jeremy Jahn	6^{5}	3
3	(Kazakhstan) A Bublik	7^{7}	6
5	(Spain) R Ramírez Hidalgo	3	7^{7}	6
Q	(Italy) Omar Giacalone	6	6^{3}	3
Q	(Serbia) M Zekić	6^{5}	1
(Belgium) Y Reuter	7^{7}	6
WC	(Italy) L Sonego	7	6
(France) J Eysseric	5	4
(Greece) S Tsitsipas	6^{6}	4
2	(Italy) A Giannessi	7^{8}	6

Second round
6	(Italy) S Napolitano	3	4
(Italy) S Travaglia	6	6
(Czech Republic) V Šafránek	6	6
3	(Kazakhstan) A Bublik	1	4
5	(Spain) R Ramírez Hidalgo	6	6
(Belgium) Y Reuter	1	1
WC	(Italy) L Sonego	6	4	4
2	(Italy) A Giannessi	3	6	6

Quarterfinals
(Italy) S Travaglia	7	3	6
(Czech Republic) V Šafránek	5	6	3
5	(Spain) R Ramírez Hidalgo	6	4	0^{r}
2	(Italy) A Giannessi	4	6	0

Semifinals
(Italy) S Travaglia	7	4	2
2	(Italy) A Giannessi	5	6	6
