= 2017 Internazionali di Tennis d'Abruzzo – Doubles =

Doubles
- 2017 Internazionali di Tennis d'Abruzzo

Final
- Champions: (Austria) Julian Knowle (Slovakia) Igor Zelenay
- Runners-up: (Australia) Rameez Junaid (Germany) Kevin Krawietz
- Score: 2–6, 6–2, [10–7]

Events
Singles	Doubles
Internazionali di Tennis d'Abruzzo	· 2018 →

This was the first edition of the tournament.

Julian Knowle and Igor Zelenay won the title after defeating Rameez Junaid and Kevin Krawietz 2–6, 6–2, [10–7] in the final.

== Seeds ==
1. (Argentina) Guillermo Durán / (Israel) Jonathan Erlich (quarterfinals)
2. (Croatia) Antonio Šančić / (Canada) Adil Shamasdin (first round)
3. (Sweden) Johan Brunström / (Sweden) Andreas Siljeström (first round, retired)
4. (Austria) Julian Knowle / (Slovakia) Igor Zelenay (champions)

== Draw ==
=== Key ===
- Q = Qualifier
- WC = Wild card
- LL = Lucky loser
- Alt = Alternate
- SE = Special exempt
- PR = Protected ranking
- ITF = ITF entry
- JE = Junior exempt
- w/o = Walkover
- r = Retired
- d = Defaulted
- SR = Special ranking

First round
1	(Argentina) G Durán (Israel) J Erlich	6	7^{7}
(Poland) T Bednarek (Italy) S Travaglia	3	6^{4}
(Croatia) M Draganja (Croatia) T Draganja	6	6
(Russia) M Elgin (Kazakhstan) A Golubev	3	3
3	(Sweden) J Brunström (Sweden) A Siljeström	2^{r}
Alt	(Serbia) F Krajinović (Serbia) M Zekić	0
WC	(Slovenia) David Lucas Ambrozić (Italy) Andrea Del Federico	1	2
(Australia) R Junaid (Germany) K Krawietz	6	6
(Italy) S Napolitano (Greece) S Tsitsipas	4	6	[13]
(Italy) M Cecchinato (Italy) M Donati	6	3	[11]
(Belgium) S Gillé (Belgium) J Vliegen	6^{5}	4
4	(Austria) J Knowle (Slovakia) I Zelenay	7^{7}	6
(Uruguay) A Behar (Brazil) F Neis	6	6
(Italy) A Motti (Netherlands) D Pel	3	4
WC	(Italy) M Berrettini (Italy) L Sonego	6	6
2	(Croatia) A Šančić (Canada) A Shamasdin	3	1

Quarterfinals
1	(Argentina) G Durán (Israel) J Erlich	2	6^{4}
(Croatia) M Draganja (Croatia) T Draganja	6	7^{7}
Alt	(Serbia) F Krajinović (Serbia) M Zekić
(Australia) R Junaid (Germany) K Krawietz	w/o
(Italy) S Napolitano (Greece) S Tsitsipas	2	3
4	(Austria) J Knowle (Slovakia) I Zelenay	6	6
(Uruguay) A Behar (Brazil) F Neis	7^{7}	2	[3]
WC	(Italy) M Berrettini (Italy) L Sonego	6^{5}	6	[10]

Semifinals
(Croatia) M Draganja (Croatia) T Draganja	4	0
(Australia) R Junaid (Germany) K Krawietz	6	6
4	(Austria) J Knowle (Slovakia) I Zelenay	6	6
WC	(Italy) M Berrettini (Italy) L Sonego	4	3

Final
(Australia) R Junaid (Germany) K Krawietz	6	2	[7]
4	(Austria) J Knowle (Slovakia) I Zelenay	2	6	[10]
