= 2019 Internazionali di Tennis d'Abruzzo =

- Date: 22–28 April
- Edition: 3rd
- Surface: Clay
- Location: Francavilla al Mare, Italy

Champions

Singles
- (Italy) Stefano Travaglia

Doubles
- (Ukraine) Denys Molchanov / (Slovakia) Igor Zelenay
← 2018 ·	Internazionali di Tennis d'Abruzzo	· 2022 →

The 2019 Internazionali di Tennis d'Abruzzo was a professional tennis tournament played on clay courts. It was the third edition of the tournament which was part of the 2019 ATP Challenger Tour. It took place in Francavilla al Mare, Italy between 22 and 28 April 2019.

== Singles main-draw entrants ==
=== Seeds ===
Country	Player	Rank^{1}	Seed
GER	Maximilian Marterer	101	1
ITA	Gianluigi Quinzi	142	2
GER	Oscar Otte	148	3
ITA	Salvatore Caruso	150	4
ITA	Stefano Travaglia	154	5
FRA	Quentin Halys	156	6
GER	Rudolf Molleker	165	7
SWE	Mikael Ymer	176	8
~~BEL~~	~~Arthur De Greef~~	~~177~~	~~9~~
BEL	Kimmer Coppejans	181	10
GER	Dominik Köpfer	183	11
NED	Tallon Griekspoor	193	12
AUT	Jurij Rodionov	195	13
CRO	Viktor Galović	199	14
ITA	Matteo Donati	205	15
ARG	Facundo Argüello	212	16

- ^{1} Rankings are as of 15 April 2019.

=== Other entrants ===
The following players received wildcards into the singles main draw:

- (Italy) Jacopo Berrettini
- (Italy) Gianluca Di Nicola
- (Italy) Lorenzo Musetti
- (Italy) Julian Ocleppo
- (Italy) Giulio Zeppieri

The following players received entry into the singles main draw using their ITF World Tennis Ranking:

- (Spain) Javier Barranco Cosano
- (Italy) Riccardo Bonadio
- (Italy) Raúl Brancaccio
- (Russia) Ivan Nedelko
- (Spain) David Pérez Sanz

The following player received entry into the singles main draw as an alternate:

- (France) Antoine Escoffier

The following players received entry from the qualifying draw:

- (Vietnam) Lý Hoàng Nam
- (Italy) Andrea Vavassori

The following player received entry as a lucky loser:

- (Italy) Andrea Del Federico

== Champions ==
=== Singles ===
- (Italy) Stefano Travaglia def. (Germany) Oscar Otte 6–3, 6–7^{(3–7)}, 6–3.

=== Doubles ===
- (Ukraine) Denys Molchanov / (Slovakia) Igor Zelenay def. (Argentina) Guillermo Durán / (Spain) David Vega Hernández 6–3, 6–2.
