= 2024 Internazionali di Tennis Francavilla al Mare – Doubles =

Doubles
- 2024 Internazionali di Tennis Francavilla al Mare

Final
- Champions: (France) Théo Arribagé (Romania) Victor Vlad Cornea
- Runners-up: (Netherlands) Sander Arends (Netherlands) Matwé Middelkoop
- Score: 7–6^{(7–1)}, 7–6^{(9–7)}

Events
Singles	Doubles
← 2023 ·	Internazionali di Tennis Francavilla al Mare	· 2025 →

Nicolás Barrientos and Ariel Behar were the defending champions but chose not to defend their title.

Théo Arribagé and Victor Vlad Cornea won the title after defeating Sander Arends and Matwé Middelkoop 7–6^{(7–1)}, 7–6^{(9–7)} in the final.

== Seeds ==
1. (Netherlands) Sander Arends / (Netherlands) Matwé Middelkoop (final)
2. (France) Théo Arribagé / (Romania) Victor Vlad Cornea (champions)
3. (France) Jonathan Eysseric / (Netherlands) Bart Stevens (semifinals)
4. (France) Dan Added / (France) Luca Sanchez (first round)

== Draw ==
Key

- Q = Qualifier
- WC = Wild card
- LL = Lucky loser
- Alt = Alternate
- ITF = ITF entry
- PR = Protected ranking
- SR = Special ranking
- SE = Special exempt
- JE = Junior exempt
- JR = Junior Accelerator Programme entrant
- CO = College Accelerator Programme entrant
- NG = Next Gen Accelerator Program entrant
- w/o = Walkover
- r = Retired
- d = Defaulted

=== Draw ===
First round
1	(Netherlands) S Arends (Netherlands) M Middelkoop	6	6
WC	(Italy) A Giannessi (Italy) F Romano	4	4
Alt	(France) G Debru (United States) E Quinn	2
(Serbia) I Sabanov (Serbia) M Sabanov	0^{r}
4	(France) D Added (France) L Sanchez	6^{6}	3
(India) S Balaji (Germany) A Begemann	7^{8}	6
Alt	(Bulgaria) A Andreev (Poland) M Kaśnikowski	3	6	[10]
(United Kingdom) S Duncan (Denmark) J Ingildsen	6	2	[4]
Alt	(United States) Nicholas Bybel (United Kingdom) O Crawford	6	7^{7}
(United Kingdom) B Harris (Japan) S Mochizuki	2	6^{5}
WC	(Italy) Lorenzo Carboni (Italy) L Rottoli	6^{5}	4
3	(France) J Eysseric (Netherlands) B Stevens	7^{7}	6
(Dominican Republic) N Hardt (Australia) A Taylor	5	2
(Canada) A Galarneau (United States) M Kiger	7	6
(Italy) M Bortolotti (Switzerland) L Margaroli	2	1
2	(France) T Arribagé (Romania) V Cornea	6	6

Quarterfinals
1	(Netherlands) S Arends (Netherlands) M Middelkoop	6	6
Alt	(France) G Debru (United States) E Quinn	3	4
(India) S Balaji (Germany) A Begemann	1	6	[12]
Alt	(Bulgaria) A Andreev (Poland) M Kaśnikowski	6	4	[10]
Alt	(United States) N Bybel (United Kingdom) O Crawford
3	(France) J Eysseric (Netherlands) B Stevens	w/o
(Canada) A Galarneau (United States) M Kiger	3	1
2	(France) T Arribagé (Romania) V Cornea	6	6

Semifinals
1	(Netherlands) S Arends (Netherlands) M Middelkoop	5	6	[10]
(India) S Balaji (Germany) A Begemann	7	3	[7]
3	(France) J Eysseric (Netherlands) B Stevens	3	4
2	(France) T Arribagé (Romania) V Cornea	6	6

Final
1	(Netherlands) S Arends (Netherlands) M Middelkoop	6^{1}	6^{7}
2	(France) T Arribagé (Romania) V Cornea	7^{7}	7^{9}
