= 2024 National Bank Open – Men's singles =

Men's singles
- 2024 National Bank Open

Final
- Champion: (Australia) Alexei Popyrin
- Runner-up: Andrey Rublev
- Score: 6–2, 6–4

Details
- Draw: 56
- Seeds: 16

Events
Singles	men	women
Doubles	men	women
← 2023 ·	Canadian Open	· 2025 →

Alexei Popyrin defeated Andrey Rublev in the final, 6–2, 6–4 to win the men's singles tennis title at the 2024 Canadian Open. It was his first Masters 1000 title and third career ATP Tour title. Popyrin saved three match points en route to the title, in the third round against Grigor Dimitrov. He was the first Australian to win a Masters title since Lleyton Hewitt at the 2003 Indian Wells Masters. Ranked No. 62, Popyrin was the second lowest-ranked men's singles champion at the Canadian Open, after Mikael Pernfors (ranked No. 95) in 1993.

Jannik Sinner was the defending champion, but lost to Rublev in the quarterfinals. Rublev was just the third player born in 1990 or later to reach the quarterfinals or better at all nine Masters events and all four majors, after Daniil Medvedev and Dimitrov.

== Seeds ==
The top eight seeds received a bye into the second round.

1. (Italy) Jannik Sinner (quarterfinals)
2. (Germany) Alexander Zverev (quarterfinals)
3. Daniil Medvedev (second round)
4. (Poland) Hubert Hurkacz (quarterfinals)
5. Andrey Rublev (final)
6. (Norway) Casper Ruud (third round, withdrew)
7. (Bulgaria) Grigor Dimitrov (third round)
8. (Greece) Stefanos Tsitsipas (second round)

9. (United States) Taylor Fritz (second round)
10. (United States) Tommy Paul (second round)
11. (United States) Ben Shelton (second round)
12. (France) Ugo Humbert (second round)
13. (Denmark) Holger Rune (third round)
14. (Canada) Félix Auger-Aliassime (first round)
15. (Chile) Alejandro Tabilo (third round)
16. Karen Khachanov (second round)

Click on the seed number of a player to go to their draw section.

== Draw ==
=== Key ===
- Q = Qualifier
- WC = Wild card
- LL = Lucky loser
- Alt = Alternate
- ITF = ITF entry
- PR = Protected ranking
- SR = Special ranking
- SE = Special exempt
- JE = Junior exempt
- JR = Junior Accelerator Programme entrant
- CO = College Accelerator Programme entrant
- NG = Next Gen Accelerator Program entrant
- w/o = Walkover
- r = Retired
- d = Defaulted

=== Finals ===
Quarterfinals
1	(Italy) Jannik Sinner	3	6	2
5	Andrey Rublev	6	1	6
(Italy) Matteo Arnaldi	6	7
PR	(Japan) Kei Nishikori	4	5
(Australia) Alexei Popyrin	3	7^{7}	7
4	(Poland) Hubert Hurkacz	6	6^{5}	5
(United States) Sebastian Korda	7^{7}	1	6
2	(Germany) Alexander Zverev	6^{5}	6	4

Semifinals
5	Andrey Rublev	6	6
(Italy) Matteo Arnaldi	4	2
(Australia) Alexei Popyrin	7^{7}	6
(United States) Sebastian Korda	6^{0}	3

Final
5	Andrey Rublev	2	4
(Australia) Alexei Popyrin	6	6

=== Top half ===
==== Section 1 ====
First round
Q	(Croatia) B Ćorić	6	6
(Spain) P Martínez	4	4
(Italy) L Sonego	7^{9}	5	6
(Netherlands) T Griekspoor	6^{7}	7	4
(United States) F Tiafoe	4	2
15	(Chile) A Tabilo	6	6
10	(United States) T Paul	6	7^{7}
(Italy) L Darderi	4	6^{2}
WC	(Canada) D Shapovalov	4	5
Q	(United States) B Nakashima	6	7
(Argentina) TM Etcheverry	7^{7}	6^{5}	6
(Chile) N Jarry	6^{5}	7^{7}	2

Second round
1	(Italy) J Sinner	6	6
Q	(Croatia) B Ćorić	2	4
(Italy) L Sonego	4	2
15	(Chile) A Tabilo	6	6
10	(United States) T Paul	2	7^{7}	1
Q	(United States) B Nakashima	6	6^{5}	6
(Argentina) TM Etcheverry	6^{3}	2
5	A Rublev	7^{7}	6

Third round
1	(Italy) J Sinner	6	6
15	(Chile) A Tabilo	4	3
Q	(United States) B Nakashima	2	2
5	A Rublev	6	6

Quarterfinals
1	(Italy) J Sinner	3	6	2
5	A Rublev	6	1	6

==== Section 2 ====
First round
(Spain) A Davidovich Fokina	6	7
R Safiullin	2	5
Q	(United States) M McDonald	6	4	4
(Italy) M Arnaldi	4	6	6
WC	(Canada) G Diallo	4	4
16	K Khachanov	6	6
12	(France) U Humbert	6	6
(France) A Fils	2	2
(Portugal) N Borges	5	6	6
(Serbia) M Kecmanović	7	4	4
(United States) A Michelsen	6	5	4
PR	(Japan) K Nishikori	3	7	6

Second round
3	D Medvedev	4	6	2
(Spain) A Davidovich Fokina	6	1	6
(Italy) M Arnaldi	7	7
16	K Khachanov	5	5
12	(France) U Humbert	6	6^{2}	6^{4}
(Portugal) N Borges	3	7^{7}	7^{7}
PR	(Japan) K Nishikori	6	6
8	(Greece) S Tsitsipas	4	4

Third round
(Spain) A Davidovich Fokina	6	6^{5}	0^{r}
(Italy) M Arnaldi	4	7^{7}	3
(Portugal) N Borges	3	4
PR	(Japan) K Nishikori	6	6

Quarterfinals
(Italy) M Arnaldi	6	7
PR	(Japan) K Nishikori	4	5

=== Bottom half ===
==== Section 3 ====
First round
Q	(Australia) R Hijikata	6	7
Q	(Japan) T Daniel	1	5
(Australia) A Popyrin	6	6
(Czech Republic) T Macháč	3	4
(Kazakhstan) A Bublik	6^{4}	2
11	(United States) B Shelton	7^{7}	6
14	(Canada) F Auger-Aliassime	3	2
(Italy) F Cobolli	6	6
(France) A Mannarino	4	6	4
Q	(France) A Rinderknech	6	2	6
Q	(Australia) T Kokkinakis	6	6
(France) G Monfils	3	3

Second round
7	(Bulgaria) G Dimitrov	6	6
Q	(Australia) R Hijikata	1	0
(Australia) A Popyrin	6	7^{7}
11	(United States) B Shelton	4	6^{4}
(Italy) F Cobolli	3	2
Q	(France) A Rinderknech	6	6
Q	(Australia) T Kokkinakis	6	3	6^{6}
4	(Poland) H Hurkacz	4	6	7^{8}

Third round
7	(Bulgaria) G Dimitrov	6	6^{5}	3
(Australia) A Popyrin	4	7^{7}	6
Q	(France) A Rinderknech	6	3	4
4	(Poland) H Hurkacz	4	6	6

Quarterfinals
(Australia) A Popyrin	3	7^{7}	7
4	(Poland) H Hurkacz	6	6^{5}	5

==== Section 4 ====
First round
LL	(Australia) J Duckworth	6	6
(United States) M Giron	4	1
(United States) S Korda	2
WC	(Canada) V Pospisil	1^{r}
(Argentina) M Navone	4	1
9	(United States) T Fritz	6	6
13	(Denmark) H Rune	6	3	6
LL	(Spain) R Bautista Agut	2	6	2
(Hungary) F Marozsán	7^{10}	6^{6}	3
PR	(Spain) P Carreño Busta	6^{8}	7^{8}	6
(Australia) J Thompson	7	6
(United Kingdom) J Draper	5	2

Second round
6	(Norway) C Ruud	6	6^{5}	6
LL	(Australia) J Duckworth	2	7^{7}	3
(United States) S Korda	6	7^{7}
9	(United States) T Fritz	4	6^{4}
13	(Denmark) H Rune	6	6
PR	(Spain) P Carreño Busta	1	3
(Australia) J Thompson	1	1
2	(Germany) A Zverev	6	6

Third round
6	(Norway) C Ruud
(United States) S Korda	w/o
13	(Denmark) H Rune	3	6^{5}
2	(Germany) A Zverev	6	7^{7}

Quarterfinals
(United States) S Korda	7^{7}	1	6
2	(Germany) A Zverev	6^{5}	6	4

== Seeded players ==
The following are the seeded players. Seedings are based on ATP rankings as of 29 July 2024. Rankings and points before are as of 5 August 2024.

Seed	Rank	Player	Points before	Points defending	Points earned	Points after	Status
1	1	(Italy) Jannik Sinner	9,570	1,000	200	8,770	Quarterfinals lost to Andrey Rublev [5]
2	4	(Germany) Alexander Zverev	6,845	(50)^{†}	200	6,995	Quarterfinals lost to (United States) Sebastian Korda
3	5	Daniil Medvedev	6,525	180	10	6,355	Second round lost to (Spain) Alejandro Davidovich Fokina
4	6	(Poland) Hubert Hurkacz	4,105	90	200	4,215	Quarterfinals lost to (Australia) Alexei Popyrin
5	8	Andrey Rublev	3,975	10	650	4,615	Runner-up, lost to (Australia) Alexei Popyrin
6	9	(Norway) Casper Ruud	3,880	90	100	3,890	Third round withdrew due to illness
7	10	(Bulgaria) Grigor Dimitrov	3,600	0	100	3,700	Third round lost to (Australia) Alexei Popyrin
8	11	(Greece) Stefanos Tsitsipas	3,465	10	10	3,465	Second round lost to (Japan) Kei Nishikori [PR]
9	13	(United States) Taylor Fritz	3,330	90	50	3,290	Second round lost to (United States) Sebastian Korda
10	12	(United States) Tommy Paul	3,375	360	50	3,065	Second round lost to (United States) Brandon Nakashima [Q]
11	14	(United States) Ben Shelton	2,950	45	50	2,955	Second round lost to (Australia) Alexei Popyrin
12	15	(France) Ugo Humbert	2,360	45	50	2,365	Second round lost to (Portugal) Nuno Borges
13	17	(Denmark) Holger Rune	2,300	10	100	2,390	Third round lost to (Germany) Alexander Zverev [2]
14	19	(Canada) Félix Auger-Aliassime	2,115	10	10	2,115	First round lost to (Italy) Flavio Cobolli
15	21	(Chile) Alejandro Tabilo	1,918	(25)^{‡}	100	1,993	Third round lost to (Italy) Jannik Sinner [1]
16	22	Karen Khachanov	1,830	0	50	1,880	Second round lost to (Italy) Matteo Arnaldi

† The player's 2023 points were replaced by a better result for purposes of his ranking as of 5 August 2024. Points for his 19th best result will be deducted instead.
‡ The player did not qualify for the tournament in 2023. Points from his 19th best result will be deducted instead.

=== Withdrawn players ===
The following players would have been seeded, but withdrew before the tournament began.

Rank	Player	Points before	Points defending	Points after	Withdrawal reason
2	(Serbia) Novak Djokovic	8,460	0	8,460	Schedule change
3	(Spain) Carlos Alcaraz	8,130	180	7,950	Fatigue
7	(Australia) Alex de Minaur	4,080	600	3,480	Hip injury
16	(Italy) Lorenzo Musetti	2,340	90	2,250	Fatigue

== Other entry information ==
=== Wildcards ===
- (Canada) Gabriel Diallo
- (Canada) Vasek Pospisil
- ~~(Canada) Milos Raonic~~
- (Canada) Denis Shapovalov

=== Protected ranking ===
- (Spain) Pablo Carreño Busta
- (Japan) Kei Nishikori

=== Withdrawals ===
- ‡ (Spain) Carlos Alcaraz → replaced by (Italy) Flavio Cobolli
- ‡ (Argentina) Sebastián Báez → replaced by (Japan) Kei Nishikori
- ‡ (Argentina) Francisco Cerúndolo → replaced by (Australia) Alexei Popyrin
- ‡ (Australia) Alex de Minaur → replaced by (Serbia) Miomir Kecmanović
- ‡ (Serbia) Novak Djokovic → replaced by Roman Safiullin
- ‡ (Czech Republic) Jiří Lehečka → replaced by (United States) Marcos Giron
- ‡ (Italy) Lorenzo Musetti → replaced by (Portugal) Nuno Borges
- § (United Kingdom) Cameron Norrie → replaced by (Australia) James Duckworth
- § (Canada) Milos Raonic → replaced by (Spain) Roberto Bautista Agut
- ‡ (Germany) Jan-Lennard Struff → replaced by (Italy) Lorenzo Sonego
- ‡ (China) Zhang Zhizhen → replaced by (Spain) Pedro Martínez

‡ – withdrew from entry list
§ – withdrew from main draw

== Qualifying ==
=== Seeds ===
1. (France) Giovanni Mpetshi Perricard (first round)
2. (Japan) Yoshihito Nishioka (first round)
3. (Spain) Roberto Carballés Baena (first round)
4. (United States) Brandon Nakashima (qualified)
5. (Australia) Max Purcell (first round)
6. (Argentina) Facundo Díaz Acosta (first round)
7. (Czech Republic) Jakub Menšík (qualifying competition)
8. (France) Arthur Rinderknech (qualified)
9. (Finland) Emil Ruusuvuori (withdrew)
10. (Spain) Roberto Bautista Agut (qualifying competition, lucky loser)
11. (Australia) Rinky Hijikata (qualified)
12. (Australia) James Duckworth (qualifying competition, lucky loser)
13. (United States) Aleksandar Kovacevic (first round)
14. (Croatia) Borna Ćorić (qualified)

=== Qualifiers ===
1. (United States) Mackenzie McDonald
2. (France) Arthur Rinderknech
3. (Australia) Thanasi Kokkinakis
4. (United States) Brandon Nakashima
5. (Japan) Taro Daniel
6. (Australia) Rinky Hijikata
7. (Croatia) Borna Ćorić

=== Lucky losers ===
1. (Spain) Roberto Bautista Agut
2. (Australia) James Duckworth

=== Draw ===
==== First qualifier ====
First round
1	(France) Giovanni Mpetshi Perricard	7^{7}	3	4
(United States) Mackenzie McDonald	6^{5}	6	6
(Argentina) Camilo Ugo Carabelli	3	4
12	(Australia) James Duckworth	6	6

Qualifying competition
(United States) Mackenzie McDonald	7^{7}	7^{7}
12	(Australia) James Duckworth	6^{4}	6^{3}

==== Second qualifier ====
First round
2	(Japan) Yoshihito Nishioka	5	0
(Australia) Christopher O'Connell	7	6
(Australia) Aleksandar Vukic	3	7^{7}	3
8	(France) Arthur Rinderknech	6	6^{3}	6

Qualifying competition
(Australia) Christopher O'Connell	1^{r}
8	(France) Arthur Rinderknech	2

==== Third qualifier ====
First round
3	(Spain) Roberto Carballés Baena	6^{4}	3
(Australia) Thanasi Kokkinakis	7^{7}	6
Alt	Aslan Karatsev	6	5	2
10	(Spain) Roberto Bautista Agut	3	7	6

Qualifying competition
(Australia) Thanasi Kokkinakis	5	7	6
10	(Spain) Roberto Bautista Agut	7	5	4

==== Fourth qualifier ====
First round
4	(United States) Brandon Nakashima	6	6
WC	(Canada) Nicolas Arseneault	3	2
(Australia) Adam Walton	4	2
Alt	(United Kingdom) Billy Harris	6	6

Qualifying competition
4	(United States) Brandon Nakashima	6	7^{7}
Alt	(United Kingdom) Billy Harris	4	6^{2}

==== Fifth qualifier ====
First round
5	(Australia) Max Purcell	6	6^{9}	4
(France) Arthur Cazaux	4	7^{11}	6
(Japan) Taro Daniel	7^{7}	6
13	(United States) Aleksandar Kovacevic	6^{5}	2

Qualifying competition
(France) Arthur Cazaux	4	4
(Japan) Taro Daniel	6	6

==== Sixth qualifier ====
First round
6	(Argentina) Facundo Díaz Acosta	4	4
WC	(Canada) Alexis Galarneau	6	6
(Germany) Daniel Altmaier	6^{4}	1
11	(Australia) Rinky Hijikata	7^{7}	6

Qualifying competition
WC	(Canada) Alexis Galarneau	6	4	6^{5}
11	(Australia) Rinky Hijikata	2	6	7^{7}

==== Seventh qualifier ====
First round
7	(Czech Republic) Jakub Menšík	6	7
WC	(Canada) Taha Baadi	3	5
WC	(Canada) Liam Draxl	4	2
14	(Croatia) Borna Ćorić	6	6

Qualifying competition
7	(Czech Republic) Jakub Menšík	6^{1}	6	4
14	(Croatia) Borna Ćorić	7^{7}	3	6
