= 2017 Internazionali di Tennis d'Abruzzo =

- Date: 24–30 April
- Edition: 1st
- Surface: Clay
- Location: Francavilla al Mare, Italy

Champions

Singles
- (Portugal) Pedro Sousa

Doubles
- (Austria) Julian Knowle / (Slovakia) Igor Zelenay
Internazionali di Tennis d'Abruzzo	· 2018 →

The 2017 Internazionali di Tennis d'Abruzzo will be a professional tennis tournament played on clay courts. It will be the first edition of the tournament which will be part of the 2017 ATP Challenger Tour. It will take place in Francavilla al Mare, Italy between 24 and 30 April 2017.

== Point distribution ==
Event	W	F	SF	QF	Round of 16	Round of 32	Q	Q2
Singles	80	48	29	15	7	0	3	0
Doubles	80	48	29	15	0	—	—	—

== Singles main-draw entrants ==
=== Seeds ===
Country	Player	Rank^{1}	Seed
POR	Gastão Elias	88	1
ITA	Alessandro Giannessi	121	2
KAZ	Alexander Bublik	138	3
ITA	Marco Cecchinato	146	4
ESP	Rubén Ramírez Hidalgo	147	5
ITA	Stefano Napolitano	172	6
FRA	Constant Lestienne	187	7
ITA	Lorenzo Giustino	195	8

- ^{1} Rankings are as of April 17, 2017.

=== Other entrants ===
The following players received wildcards into the singles main draw:

- (Italy) Matteo Berrettini
- (Italy) Simone Bolelli
- (Italy) Andrea Pellegrino
- (Italy) Lorenzo Sonego

The following players received entry from the qualifying draw:

- (Italy) Omar Giacalone
- (Serbia) Filip Krajinović
- (Austria) Sebastian Ofner
- (Serbia) Miljan Zekić

== Champions ==
=== Singles ===
- (Portugal) Pedro Sousa def. (Italy) Alessandro Giannessi 6–3, 7–6^{(7–3)}.

=== Doubles ===
- (Austria) Julian Knowle / (Slovakia) Igor Zelenay def. (Australia) Rameez Junaid / (Germany) Kevin Krawietz 2–6, 6–2, [10–7].
