= Pomilio (surname) =

Pomilio is an Italian surname. Notable people with the surname include:

- Amedeo Pomilio (born 1967), Italian water polo player
- Mario Pomilio (1921–1990), Italian writer, essayist and journalist
- Vittorio Pomilio (1933–2025), Italian basketball player
