= 2018 Internazionali di Tennis d'Abruzzo =

- Date: 23–29 April
- Edition: 2nd
- Surface: Clay
- Location: Francavilla al Mare, Italy

Champions

Singles
- (Italy) Gianluigi Quinzi

Doubles
- (Italy) Julian Ocleppo / (Italy) Andrea Vavassori
← 2017 ·	Internazionali di Tennis d'Abruzzo	· 2019 →

The 2018 Internazionali di Tennis d'Abruzzo was a professional tennis tournament played on clay courts. It was the second edition of the tournament which was part of the 2018 ATP Challenger Tour. It took place in Francavilla al Mare, Italy between 23 and 29 April 2018.

== Singles main-draw entrants ==
=== Seeds ===
Country	Player	Rank^{1}	Seed
BEL	Ruben Bemelmans	108	1
ITA	Stefano Travaglia	109	2
~~POR~~	~~Gastão Elias~~	~~110~~	~~3~~
~~ITA~~	~~Simone Bolelli~~	~~144~~	~~4~~
GBR	Liam Broady	157	5
CAN	Félix Auger-Aliassime	175	6
CRO	Viktor Galović	183	7
ARG	Renzo Olivo	189	8
ITA	Salvatore Caruso	195	9

- ^{1} Rankings are as of 16 April 2018.

=== Other entrants ===
The following players received wildcards into the singles main draw:

- (Italy) Filippo Baldi
- (Italy) Gian Marco Moroni
- (Italy) Andrea Pellegrino
- (Italy) Gianluigi Quinzi

The following players received entry from the qualifying draw:

- (Belgium) Joris De Loore
- (France) Antoine Hoang
- (Bulgaria) Dimitar Kuzmanov
- (Italy) Luca Vanni

The following players received entry as lucky losers:

- (France) Elliot Benchetrit
- (Belgium) Kimmer Coppejans
- (Italy) Matteo Viola
- (China) Zhang Zhizhen

== Champions ==
=== Singles ===
- (Italy) Gianluigi Quinzi def. (Norway) Casper Ruud 6–4, 6–1.

=== Doubles ===
- (Italy) Julian Ocleppo / (Italy) Andrea Vavassori def. (Uruguay) Ariel Behar / (Argentina) Máximo González 7–6^{(7–5)}, 7–6^{(7–3)}.
