= 2024 Internazionali di Tennis Francavilla al Mare – Singles =

Singles
- 2024 Internazionali di Tennis Francavilla al Mare

Final
- Champion: (France) Titouan Droguet
- Runner-up: (Italy) Jacopo Berrettini
- Score: 6–3, 7–6^{(7–4)}

Events
| Singles | Doubles |
- Internazionali di Tennis Francavilla al Mare

Alejandro Tabilo was the defending champion but chose not to defend his title.

Titouan Droguet won the title after defeating Jacopo Berrettini 6–3, 7–6^{(7–4)} in the final.

== Seeds ==
1. (France) Titouan Droguet (champion)
2. (Canada) Alexis Galarneau (second round)
3. (Japan) Shintaro Mochizuki (first round)
4. (Italy) Andrea Pellegrino (quarterfinals)
5. (Bolivia) Hugo Dellien (withdrew)
6. (Italy) Stefano Travaglia (first round)
7. (United Kingdom) Oliver Crawford (first round)
8. (United States) Tristan Boyer (second round)

== Draw ==
Key

- Q = Qualifier
- WC = Wild card
- LL = Lucky loser
- Alt = Alternate
- ITF = ITF entry
- PR = Protected ranking
- SR = Special ranking
- SE = Special exempt
- JE = Junior exempt
- JR = Junior Accelerator Programme entrant
- CO = College Accelerator Programme entrant
- NG = Next Gen Accelerator Program entrant
- w/o = Walkover
- r = Retired
- d = Defaulted

=== Finals ===
Semifinals
1 | (France) Titouan Droguet | 6 | 7
(Italy) Franco Agamenone | 3 | 5
(Dominican Republic) Nick Hardt | 3 | 6 | 2
WC | (Italy) Jacopo Berrettini | 6 | 4 | 6

Final
1 | (France) Titouan Droguet | 6 | 7^{7}
WC | (Italy) Jacopo Berrettini | 3 | 6^{4}

=== Top half ===
First round
1 | (France) T Droguet | 6 | 6
(France) Jules Marie | 1 | 0
(United Kingdom) B Harris | 6 | 3 | 3
Q | (Italy) A Guerrieri | 4 | 6 | 6
(United States) E Quinn | 5 | 5
WC | (Italy) G Piraino | 7 | 7
Q | (Switzerland) D Wenger | 4 | 6^{4}
8 | (United States) T Boyer | 6 | 7^{7}
3 | (Japan) S Mochizuki | 4 | 5
Q | (Netherlands) Ryan Nijboer | 6 | 7
WC | (Italy) Lorenzo Carboni | 6 | 1 | 1^{r}
Q | (Italy) F Arnaboldi | 2 | 6 | 4
(Italy) M Cecchinato | 6 | 7^{7}
(Italy) Alexander Weis | 1 | 6^{2}
(Italy) F Agamenone | 6 | 6
6 | (Italy) S Travaglia | 3 | 2

Second round
1 | (France) T Droguet | 7^{8} | 6
Q | (Italy) A Guerrieri | 6^{6} | 4
WC | (Italy) G Piraino | 5 | 7 | 6
8 | (United States) T Boyer | 7 | 5 | 3
Q | (Netherlands) R Nijboer | 7^{7} | 6
Q | (Italy) F Arnaboldi | 6^{5} | 1
(Italy) M Cecchinato | 6^{9} | 6 | 4
(Italy) F Agamenone | 7^{11} | 2 | 6

Quarterfinals
1 | (France) T Droguet | 7 | 6
WC | (Italy) G Piraino | 5 | 1
Q | (Netherlands) R Nijboer | 4 | 0
(Italy) F Agamenone | 6 | 6

Semifinals
1 | (France) T Droguet | 6 | 7
(Italy) F Agamenone | 3 | 5

=== Bottom half ===
First round
7 | (United Kingdom) O Crawford | 1 | 5
(Poland) M Kaśnikowski | 6 | 7
(Dominican Republic) N Hardt | 7^{7} | 6
(Italy) E Dalla Valle | 6^{1} | 2
(Bulgaria) A Andreev | 6 | 6
(United States) Dar Blanch | 1 | 3
(Bolivia) M Dellien | 4 | 7 | 3
4 | (Italy) A Pellegrino | 6 | 5 | 6
Q | (Portugal) G Elias | 3 | 7^{7} | 6
(Italy) G Mager | 6 | 6^{5} | 2
Q | (Italy) A Giannessi | 1 | 0
LL | (Denmark) E Møller | 6 | 6
I Gakhov | 6^{7} | 6 | 5
WC | (Italy) J Berrettini | 7^{9} | 1 | 7
(Spain) D Rincón | 6^{3} | 6 | 1
2 | (Canada) A Galarneau | 7^{7} | 1 | 6

Second round
(Poland) M Kaśnikowski | 7^{9} | 3 | 2
(Dominican Republic) N Hardt | 6^{7} | 6 | 6
(Bulgaria) A Andreev | 3 | 6 | 5
4 | (Italy) A Pellegrino | 6 | 4 | 7
Q | (Portugal) G Elias | 4 | 6 | 1
LL | (Denmark) E Møller | 6 | 3 | 6
WC | (Italy) J Berrettini | 4 | 7 | 7
2 | (Canada) A Galarneau | 6 | 5 | 5

Quarterfinals
(Dominican Republic) N Hardt | 7^{7} | 6
4 | (Italy) A Pellegrino | 6^{1} | 3
LL | (Denmark) E Møller | 6 | 6^{3} | 3
WC | (Italy) J Berrettini | 4 | 7^{7} | 6

Semifinals
(Dominican Republic) N Hardt | 3 | 6 | 2
WC | (Italy) J Berrettini | 6 | 4 | 6
