= 2022 Internazionali di Tennis d'Abruzzo – Doubles =

Doubles
- 2022 Internazionali di Tennis d'Abruzzo

Final
- Champions: (France) Dan Added (Argentina) Hernán Casanova
- Runners-up: (Italy) Davide Pozzi (Italy) Augusto Virgili
- Score: 6–3, 7–5

Events
Singles	Doubles
- Internazionali di Tennis d'Abruzzo

Denys Molchanov and Igor Zelenay were the defending champions but chose not to defend their title.

Dan Added and Hernán Casanova won the title after defeating Davide Pozzi and Augusto Virgili 6–3, 7–5 in the final.

== Seeds ==
1. (France) Dan Added / (Argentina) Hernán Casanova (champions)
2. (Netherlands) Mats Hermans / (Romania) Alexandru Jecan (quarterfinals)
3. (Australia) Thomas Fancutt / (Australia) Tristan Schoolkate (first round)
4. (Italy) Matteo Arnaldi / (Italy) Matteo Gigante (first round)

== Draw ==
Key

- Q = Qualifier
- WC = Wild card
- LL = Lucky loser
- Alt = Alternate
- ITF = ITF entry
- PR = Protected ranking
- SR = Special ranking
- SE = Special exempt
- JE = Junior exempt
- JR = Junior Accelerator Programme entrant
- CO = College Accelerator Programme entrant
- NG = Next Gen Accelerator Program entrant
- w/o = Walkover
- r = Retired
- d = Defaulted

First round
1	(France) D Added (Argentina) H Casanova	6	6
(France) M Bourgue (France) M Martineau	4	2
(Brazil) D Dutra da Silva (Dominican Republic) N Hardt	6	4	[10]
(Italy) F Forti (Italy) F Maestrelli	2	6	[4]
4/WC	(Italy) M Arnaldi (Italy) M Gigante	6^{1}	3
(Italy) F Baldi (Italy) G Fonio	7^{7}	6
(Belgium) Christopher Heyman (Ukraine) O Krutykh	6^{4}	2
(Canada) A Galarneau (United States) A Rybakov	7^{7}	6
(United Kingdom) B Harris (Argentina) M Kestelboim	6^{14}	3
(Germany) Jeremy Jahn (Germany) M Rosenkranz	7^{16}	6
(United States) Jack Vance (United States) Tennyson Whiting	7^{9}	5	[13]
3	(Australia) T Fancutt (Australia) T Schoolkate	6^{7}	7	[11]
(Italy) Davide Pozzi (Italy) Augusto Virgili	6	7^{7}
(Australia) A Taylor (Australia) J Taylor	4	6^{5}
WC	(Italy) Lorenzo Claverie (India) MM Dhamne	2	0
2	(Netherlands) M Hermans (Romania) A Jecan	6	6

Quarterfinals
1	(France) D Added (Argentina) H Casanova	4	6	[10]
(Brazil) D Dutra da Silva (Dominican Republic) N Hardt	6	3	[8]
(Italy) F Baldi (Italy) G Fonio	1	6	[8]
(Canada) A Galarneau (United States) A Rybakov	6	3	[10]
(Germany) J Jahn (Germany) M Rosenkranz	6	6
(United States) Jac Vance (United States) T Whiting	4	1
(Italy) D Pozzi (Italy) A Virgili	2	6	[11]
2	(Netherlands) M Hermans (Romania) A Jecan	6	3	[9]

Semifinals
1	(France) D Added (Argentina) H Casanova	6	3	[13]
(Canada) A Galarneau (United States) A Rybakov	4	6	[11]
(Germany) J Jahn (Germany) M Rosenkranz	6^{4}	6^{5}
(Italy) D Pozzi (Italy) A Virgili	7^{7}	7^{7}

Final
1	(France) D Added (Argentina) H Casanova	6	7
(Italy) D Pozzi (Italy) A Virgili	3	5
