= 2024 Francavilla al Mare Open =

2024 Internazionali di Tennis Francavilla al Mare
- Date: 6–12 May
- Edition: 6th
- Surface: Clay
- Location: Francavilla al Mare, Italy

Champions

Singles
- (France) Titouan Droguet

Doubles
- (France) Théo Arribagé / (Romania) Victor Vlad Cornea
- Internazionali di Tennis Francavilla al Mare

The 2024 Francavilla al Mare Open was a professional tennis tournament played on clay courts. It was the sixth edition of the tournament which was part of the 2024 ATP Challenger Tour. It took place in Francavilla al Mare, Italy between 6 and 12 May 2024.

== Singles main-draw entrants ==
=== Seeds ===
Country	Player	Rank^{1}	Seed
FRA	Titouan Droguet	151	1
CAN	Alexis Galarneau	161	2
JPN	Shintaro Mochizuki	163	3
ITA	Andrea Pellegrino	166	4
~~BOL~~	~~Hugo Dellien~~	~~173~~	~~5~~
ITA	Stefano Travaglia	196	6
GBR	Oliver Crawford	197	7
USA	Tristan Boyer	200	8

- ^{1} Rankings are as of 22 April 2024.

=== Other entrants ===
The following players received wildcards into the singles main draw:

- (Italy) Jacopo Berrettini
- (Italy) Lorenzo Carboni
- (Italy) Gabriele Piraino

The following players received entry from the qualifying draw:

- (Italy) Federico Arnaboldi
- (Portugal) Gastão Elias
- (Italy) Alessandro Giannessi
- (Italy) Andrea Guerrieri
- (Netherlands) Ryan Nijboer
- (Switzerland) Damien Wenger

The following player received entry as a lucky loser:

- (Denmark) Elmer Møller

== Champions ==
=== Singles ===
- (France) Titouan Droguet def. (Italy) Jacopo Berrettini 6–3, 7–6^{(7–4)}.

=== Doubles ===
- (France) Théo Arribagé / (Romania) Victor Vlad Cornea def. (Netherlands) Sander Arends / (Netherlands) Matwé Middelkoop 7–6^{(7–1)}, 7–6^{(9–7)}.
