= 2022 Internazionali di Tennis d'Abruzzo – Singles =

Singles
- 2022 Internazionali di Tennis d'Abruzzo

Final
- Champion: (Italy) Matteo Arnaldi
- Runner-up: (Italy) Francesco Maestrelli
- Score: 6–3, 6–7^{(7–9)}, 6–4

Events
Singles	Doubles
- Internazionali di Tennis d'Abruzzo

Stefano Travaglia was the defending champion but chose not to defend his title.

Matteo Arnaldi won the title after defeating Francesco Maestrelli 6–3, 6–7^{(7–9)}, 6–4 in the final.

== Seeds ==
1. (United States) Nicolas Moreno de Alboran (withdrew)
2. (Hungary) Máté Valkusz (quarterfinals, retired)
3. (Brazil) Daniel Dutra da Silva (second round)
4. (Italy) Matteo Arnaldi (champion)
5. (Canada) Alexis Galarneau (semifinals)
6. (Argentina) Hernán Casanova (semifinals, retired)
7. (France) Mathias Bourgue (quarterfinals)
8. (Dominican Republic) Nick Hardt (first round)
9. (Ukraine) Oleksii Krutykh (first round)

== Draw ==
Key

- Q = Qualifier
- WC = Wild card
- LL = Lucky loser
- Alt = Alternate
- ITF = ITF entry
- PR = Protected ranking
- SR = Special ranking
- SE = Special exempt
- JE = Junior exempt
- JR = Junior Accelerator Programme entrant
- CO = College Accelerator Programme entrant
- NG = Next Gen Accelerator Program entrant
- w/o = Walkover
- r = Retired
- d = Defaulted

=== Finals ===
Semifinals
WC	(Italy) Francesco Maestrelli	6	7^{7}
5	(Canada) Alexis Galarneau	0	6^{4}
4/WC	(Italy) Matteo Arnaldi	6	0
6	(Argentina) Hernán Casanova	3	0^{r}

Final
WC	(Italy) Francesco Maestrelli	3	7^{9}	4
4/WC	(Italy) Matteo Arnaldi	6	6^{7}	6

=== Top half ===
First round
9	(Ukraine) O Krutykh	6	3	2
WC	(Italy) F Maestrelli	4	6	6
(France) M Martineau	6	4	6^{1}
(United Kingdom) B Harris	4	6	7^{7}
PR	(China) Y Wu	7	6
(Germany) M Rosenkranz	5	2
Q	(Italy) Davide Galoppini	6	0	1
7	(France) M Bourgue	4	6	6
3	(Brazil) D Dutra da Silva	6	6
Q	(France) A Reymond	2	4
Q	(Italy) Gian Marco Ortenzi	0	4
(United States) A Rybakov	6	6
LL	(Australia) T Schoolkate	4	2
LL	(Italy) Riccardo Balzerani	6	6
PR	(Germany) Jeremy Jahn	4	3
5	(Canada) A Galarneau	6	6

Second round
WC	(Italy) F Maestrelli	2	6	6
(United Kingdom) B Harris	6	3	2
PR	(China) Y Wu	5	0^{r}
7	(France) M Bourgue	7	3
3	(Brazil) D Dutra da Silva	7^{7}	3	1
(United States) A Rybakov	6^{4}	6	6
LL	(Italy) R Balzerani	3	0^{r}
5	(Canada) A Galarneau	6	4

Quarterfinals
WC	(Italy) F Maestrelli	3	6	6
7	(France) M Bourgue	6	3	1
(United States) A Rybakov	6	3	4
5	(Canada) A Galarneau	2	6	6

Semifinals
WC	(Italy) F Maestrelli	6	7^{7}
5	(Canada) A Galarneau	0	6^{4}

=== Bottom half ===
First round
8	(Dominican Republic) N Hardt	4	6	3
(France) D Added	6	1	6
Alt	(Italy) F Baldi	6	3	6
Q	(France) H Mayot	1	6	3
Q	(Poland) Paweł Ciaś	6	6
(Belgium) Christopher Heyman	1	2
(Italy) F Forti	1	3
4/WC	(Italy) M Arnaldi	6	6
6	(Argentina) H Casanova	7^{7}	6
Alt	(Italy) G Fonio	6^{1}	1
WC	(Italy) M Gigante	7	6^{4}	4
(Portugal) J Domingues	5	7^{7}	6
(Italy) M Viola	6	7^{7}
Q	(Italy) Omar Giacalone	2	6^{3}
(Spain) C Gimeno Valero	3	2^{r}
2	(Hungary) M Valkusz	6	5

Second round
(France) D Added	6	0	6
Alt	(Italy) F Baldi	3	6	4
Q	(Poland) P Ciaś	1	2
4/WC	(Italy) M Arnaldi	6	6
6	(Argentina) H Casanova	6	6
(Portugal) J Domingues	4	4
(Italy) M Viola	3	6	3
2	(Hungary) M Valkusz	6	2	6

Quarterfinals
(France) D Added	1	0
4/WC	(Italy) M Arnaldi	6	6
6	(Argentina) H Casanova	7^{7}	5
2	(Hungary) M Valkusz	6^{4}	3^{r}

Semifinals
4/WC	(Italy) M Arnaldi	6	0
6	(Argentina) H Casanova	3	0^{r}
