= 2023 Internazionali di Tennis d'Abruzzo – Doubles =

Doubles
- 2023 Internazionali di Tennis d'Abruzzo

Final
- Champions: (Colombia) Nicolás Barrientos (Uruguay) Ariel Behar
- Runners-up: (Netherlands) Sander Arends (Greece) Petros Tsitsipas
- Score: 7–6^{(7–1)}, 3–6, [10–6]

Events
Singles	Doubles
- Internazionali di Tennis d'Abruzzo

Dan Added and Hernán Casanova were the defending champions but chose not to defend their title.

Nicolás Barrientos and Ariel Behar won the title after defeating Sander Arends and Petros Tsitsipas 7–6^{(7–1)}, 3–6, [10–6] in the final.

== Seeds ==
1. (Colombia) Nicolás Barrientos / (Uruguay) Ariel Behar (champions)
2. (Netherlands) Sander Arends / (Greece) Petros Tsitsipas (final)
3. (France) Théo Arribagé / (France) Luca Sanchez (semifinals)
4. (Switzerland) Luca Margaroli / (India) Purav Raja (semifinals)

== Draw ==
Key

- Q = Qualifier
- WC = Wild card
- LL = Lucky loser
- Alt = Alternate
- ITF = ITF entry
- PR = Protected ranking
- SR = Special ranking
- SE = Special exempt
- JE = Junior exempt
- JR = Junior Accelerator Programme entrant
- CO = College Accelerator Programme entrant
- NG = Next Gen Accelerator Program entrant
- w/o = Walkover
- r = Retired
- d = Defaulted

First round
1	(Colombia) N Barrientos (Uruguay) A Behar	6	6
(Israel) D Cukierman (United States) N Moreno de Alboran	4	2
Alt	(Germany) Elmar Ejupovic (Italy) Alexander Weis	3	3
(Poland) P Matuszewski (Germany) K Wehnelt	6	6
4	(Switzerland) L Margaroli (India) P Raja	6	6
(Australia) C Puttergill (Canada) K Stevenson	4	4
WC	(Italy) Lorenzo Carboni (Italy) Lorenzo Sciahbasi	6	6
(Australia) J Taylor (Australia) B Walkin	3	4
Alt	(Netherlands) J de Jong (Netherlands) M Hermans	6	6^{7}	[10]
WC	(Italy) G Piraino (Italy) Giorgio Tabacco	3	7^{9}	[5]
(Argentina) R Olivo (Argentina) TA Tirante	6	4	[7]
3	(France) T Arribagé (France) L Sanchez	4	6	[10]
(Romania) ND Ionel (Romania) A Jecan	4	2
(Brazil) F Romboli (Italy) S Travaglia	6	6
(Tunisia) A Dougaz (Colombia) N Mejía	4^{r}
2	(Netherlands) S Arends (Greece) Pe Tsitsipas	4

Quarterfinals
1	(Colombia) N Barrientos (Uruguay) A Behar	4	6	[10]
(Poland) P Matuszewski (Germany) K Wehnelt	6	1	[5]
4	(Switzerland) L Margaroli (India) P Raja	6	7^{7}
WC	(Italy) L Carboni (Italy) L Sciahbasi	4	6^{5}
Alt	(Netherlands) J de Jong (Netherlands) M Hermans	6	6^{5}	[7]
3	(France) T Arribagé (France) L Sanchez	1	7^{7}	[10]
(Brazil) F Romboli (Italy) S Travaglia	6	1	[6]
2	(Netherlands) S Arends (Greece) Pe Tsitsipas	4	6	[10]

Semifinals
1	(Colombia) N Barrientos (Uruguay) A Behar	6	6
4	(Switzerland) L Margaroli (India) P Raja	3	4
3	(France) T Arribagé (France) L Sanchez	4	4
2	(Netherlands) S Arends (Greece) Pe Tsitsipas	6	6

Final
1	(Colombia) N Barrientos (Uruguay) A Behar	7^{7}	3	[10]
2	(Netherlands) S Arends (Greece) Pe Tsitsipas	6^{1}	6	[6]
