= 2023 Internazionali di Tennis d'Abruzzo =

- Date: 8–14 May
- Edition: 5th
- Surface: Clay
- Location: Francavilla al Mare, Italy

Champions

Singles
- (Chile) Alejandro Tabilo

Doubles
- (Colombia) Nicolás Barrientos / (Uruguay) Ariel Behar
- Internazionali di Tennis d'Abruzzo

The 2023 Internazionali di Tennis d'Abruzzo was a professional tennis tournament played on clay courts. It was the fifth edition of the tournament which was part of the 2023 ATP Challenger Tour. It took place in Francavilla al Mare, Italy between 8 and 14 May 2023.

== Singles main-draw entrants ==
=== Seeds ===
| Country | Player | Rank^{1} | Seed |
|---|---|---|---|
| ~~GBR~~ | ~~Liam Broady~~ | ~~136~~ | ~~1~~ |
| ARG | Thiago Agustín Tirante | 151 | 2 |
| CHI | Alejandro Tabilo | 154 | 3 |
| FRA | Benoît Paire | 161 | 4 |
| BEL | Kimmer Coppejans | 178 | 5 |
| BUL | Dimitar Kuzmanov | 191 | 6 |
| ROU | Nicholas David Ionel | 202 | 7 |
| USA | Nicolas Moreno de Alboran | 205 | 8 |
| BEL | Raphaël Collignon | 211 | 9 |

- ^{1} Rankings are as of 24 April 2023.

=== Other entrants ===
The following players received wildcards into the singles main draw:

- (Italy) Gabriele Piraino
- (Italy) Fausto Tabacco
- (Italy) Giorgio Tabacco

The following players received entry into the singles main draw as alternates:

- (Italy) Salvatore Caruso
- (Belgium) Raphaël Collignon
- (Germany) Elmar Ejupovic
- (Italy) Alessandro Giannessi
- (Kazakhstan) Mikhail Kukushkin
- (Italy) Gianluca Mager

The following players received entry from the qualifying draw:

- (Croatia) Duje Ajduković
- (Italy) Andrea Arnaboldi
- (Tunisia) Moez Echargui
- (Italy) Giovanni Fonio
- (Italy) Edoardo Lavagno
- (Italy) Stefano Travaglia

== Champions ==
=== Singles ===
- (Chile) Alejandro Tabilo def. (France) Benoît Paire 6–1, 7–5.

=== Doubles ===
- (Colombia) Nicolás Barrientos / (Uruguay) Ariel Behar def. (Netherlands) Sander Arends / (Greece) Petros Tsitsipas 7–6^{(7–1)}, 3–6, [10–6].
