= 2018 Internazionali di Tennis d'Abruzzo – Doubles =

Doubles
- 2018 Internazionali di Tennis d'Abruzzo

Final
- Champions: (Italy) Julian Ocleppo (Italy) Andrea Vavassori
- Runners-up: (Uruguay) Ariel Behar (Argentina) Máximo González
- Score: 7–6^{(7–5)}, 7–6^{(7–3)}

Events
Singles	Doubles
- Internazionali di Tennis d'Abruzzo

Julian Knowle and Igor Zelenay were the defending champions but only Zelenay chose to defend his title, partnering Denys Molchanov. Zelenay lost in the semifinals to Ariel Behar and Máximo González.

Julian Ocleppo and Andrea Vavassori won the title after defeating Behar and González 7–6^{(7–5)}, 7–6^{(7–3)} in the final.

== Seeds ==
1. (Argentina) Guillermo Durán / (United Kingdom) Joe Salisbury (quarterfinals)
2. (Uruguay) Ariel Behar / (Argentina) Máximo González (final)
3. (Belgium) Sander Gillé / (Belgium) Joran Vliegen (quarterfinals)
4. (Ukraine) Denys Molchanov / (Slovakia) Igor Zelenay (semifinals)

== Draw ==
Key

- Q = Qualifier
- WC = Wild card
- LL = Lucky loser
- Alt = Alternate
- ITF = ITF entry
- PR = Protected ranking
- SR = Special ranking
- SE = Special exempt
- JE = Junior exempt
- JR = Junior Accelerator Programme entrant
- CO = College Accelerator Programme entrant
- NG = Next Gen Accelerator Program entrant
- w/o = Walkover
- r = Retired
- d = Defaulted

First round
1	(Argentina) G Durán (United Kingdom) J Salisbury	6	6
(Australia) R Junaid (Netherlands) D Pel	4	4
(United Kingdom) L Broady (United Kingdom) S Clayton	2	2
(Germany) K Krawietz (Germany) A Mies	6	6
3	(Belgium) S Gillé (Belgium) J Vliegen	6	3	[10]
(Turkey) T Altuna (Czech Republic) Z Kolář	2	6	[3]
WC	(Italy) J Ocleppo (Italy) A Vavassori	5	7	[10]
(India) S Nagal (Portugal) G Oliveira	7	5	[8]
(Monaco) R Arneodo (France) A Hoang	6	6^{5}	[10]
WC	(Italy) F Baldi (Italy) A Pellegrino	4	7^{7}	[8]
(Croatia) M Draganja (Croatia) T Draganja	2	2
4	(Ukraine) D Molchanov (Slovakia) I Zelenay	6	6
(Italy) A Motti (Spain) D Vega Hernández	2	6	[11]
(Belgium) R Bemelmans (Netherlands) T Griekspoor	6	2	[13]
WC	(Italy) Andrea Del Federico (Bulgaria) D Kuzmanov	4	0
2	(Uruguay) A Behar (Argentina) M González	6	6

Quarterfinals
1	(Argentina) G Durán (United Kingdom) J Salisbury	6^{5}	4
(Germany) K Krawietz (Germany) A Mies	7^{7}	6
3	(Belgium) S Gillé (Belgium) J Vliegen	6	3	[8]
WC	(Italy) J Ocleppo (Italy) A Vavassori	4	6	[10]
(Monaco) R Arneodo (France) A Hoang	2	6^{3}
4	(Ukraine) D Molchanov (Slovakia) I Zelenay	6	7^{7}
(Belgium) R Bemelmans (Netherlands) T Griekspoor	7	4	[5]
2	(Uruguay) A Behar (Argentina) M González	5	6	[10]

Semifinals
(Germany) K Krawietz (Germany) A Mies	7^{7}	5	[8]
WC	(Italy) J Ocleppo (Italy) A Vavassori	6^{3}	7	[10]
4	(Ukraine) D Molchanov (Slovakia) I Zelenay	6	6^{1}	[6]
2	(Uruguay) A Behar (Argentina) M González	4	7^{7}	[10]

Final
WC	(Italy) J Ocleppo (Italy) A Vavassori	7^{7}	7^{7}
2	(Uruguay) A Behar (Argentina) M González	6^{5}	6^{3}
