= Vittorio Pomilio =

Italian basketball player (1933–2025)

Vittoria Pomilio
Personal information
- Born: 6 May 1933 Francavilla al Mare, Italy
- Died: 31 December 2024 (aged 91) Francavilla al Mare, Italy

Career history
- ?–?: Stella Azzurra Roma
- ?–?: Società Cestistica Mazzini
- 1957–1960: Italy

Vittorio Pomilio (6 May 1933 – 31 December 2024) was an Italian basketball player. He died on 1 January 2025, at the age of 91.
