= 2023 National Bank Open – Men's singles =

Men's singles
- 2023 National Bank Open

Final
- Champion: (Italy) Jannik Sinner
- Runner-up: (Australia) Alex de Minaur
- Score: 6–4, 6–1

Details
- Draw: 56
- Seeds: 16

Events
Singles	men	women
Doubles	men	women
- Canadian Open

Jannik Sinner defeated Alex de Minaur in the final, 6–4, 6–1 to win the men's singles title at the 2023 Canadian Open. It was his first ATP Masters 1000 title and eighth ATP Tour singles title overall.

Pablo Carreño Busta was the reigning champion, but withdrew before the tournament began due to injury.

== Seeds ==
The top eight seeds received a bye into the second round.

1. (Spain) Carlos Alcaraz (quarterfinals)
2. Daniil Medvedev (quarterfinals)
3. (Norway) Casper Ruud (third round)
4. (Greece) Stefanos Tsitsipas (second round)
5. (Denmark) Holger Rune (second round)
6. Andrey Rublev (second round)
7. (Italy) Jannik Sinner (champion)
8. (United States) Taylor Fritz (third round)
9. (United States) Frances Tiafoe (first round)
10. (Canada) Félix Auger-Aliassime (first round)
11. (United Kingdom) Cameron Norrie (first round)
12. (United States) Tommy Paul (semifinals)
13. (Germany) Alexander Zverev (second round)
14. (Croatia) Borna Ćorić (first round)
15. (Poland) Hubert Hurkacz (third round)
16. (Italy) Lorenzo Musetti (third round)

Click on the seed number of a player to go to their draw section.

== Draw ==
Key

- Q = Qualifier
- WC = Wild card
- LL = Lucky loser
- Alt = Alternate
- ITF = ITF entry
- PR = Protected ranking
- SR = Special ranking
- SE = Special exempt
- JE = Junior exempt
- JR = Junior Accelerator Programme entrant
- CO = College Accelerator Programme entrant
- NG = Next Gen Accelerator Program entrant
- w/o = Walkover
- r = Retired
- d = Defaulted

=== Finals ===
Quarterfinals
1	(Spain) Carlos Alcaraz	3	6	3
12	(United States) Tommy Paul	6	4	6
PR	(France) Gaël Monfils	4	6	3
7	(Italy) Jannik Sinner	6	4	6
(United States) Mackenzie McDonald	4	2
(Spain) Alejandro Davidovich Fokina	6	6
(Australia) Alex de Minaur	7^{9}	7
2	Daniil Medvedev	6^{7}	5

Semifinals
12	(United States) Tommy Paul	4	4
7	(Italy) Jannik Sinner	6	6
(Spain) Alejandro Davidovich Fokina	1	3
(Australia) Alex de Minaur	6	6

Final
7	(Italy) Jannik Sinner	6	6
(Australia) Alex de Minaur	4	1

=== Top half ===
==== Section 1 ====
First round
(United States) B Shelton	7^{7}	6
(Spain) B Zapata Miralles	6^{1}	4
Q	(Chile) C Garín	6^{2}	6	4
(Serbia) M Kecmanović	7^{7}	4	6
(Kazakhstan) A Bublik	3	6^{2}
15	(Poland) H Hurkacz	6	7^{7}
12	(United States) T Paul	6	3	6
Q	(Argentina) D Schwartzman	3	6	4
WC	(Canada) A Galarneau	2	6	4
(Argentina) F Cerúndolo	6	4	6
(Finland) E Ruusuvuori	6^{4}	6^{6}
Q	(United States) M Giron	7^{7}	7^{8}

Second round
1	(Spain) C Alcaraz	6	7^{7}
(United States) B Shelton	3	6^{3}
(Serbia) M Kecmanović	7	3	0
15	(Poland) H Hurkacz	5	6	6
12	(United States) T Paul	7^{7}	6^{2}	6
(Argentina) F Cerúndolo	6^{2}	7^{7}	3
Q	(United States) M Giron	6	4	6
5	(Denmark) H Rune	2	6	3

Third round
1	(Spain) C Alcaraz	3	7^{7}	7^{7}
15	(Poland) H Hurkacz	6	6^{2}	6^{3}
12	(United States) T Paul	6	6
Q	(United States) M Giron	3	2

Quarterfinals
1	(Spain) C Alcaraz	3	6	3
12	(United States) T Paul	6	4	6

==== Section 2 ====
First round
PR	(France) G Monfils	7^{7}	6^{4}	6
(United States) C Eubanks	6^{3}	7^{7}	1
(Argentina) TM Etcheverry	3	2
(United States) S Korda	6	6
LL	(Australia) A Vukic	6	6
14	(Croatia) B Ćorić	2	3
10	(Canada) F Auger-Aliassime	4	4
Q	(Australia) M Purcell	6	6
(Italy) L Sonego	6^{3}	0
(United Kingdom) A Murray	7^{7}	6
(France) G Barrère	4	3
(Italy) M Berrettini	6	6

Second round
4	(Greece) S Tsitsipas	4	3
PR	(France) G Monfils	6	6
(United States) S Korda	3	6	6^{5}
LL	(Australia) A Vukic	6	4	7^{7}
Q	(Australia) M Purcell	6^{2}	6	5
(United Kingdom) A Murray	7^{7}	3	7
(Italy) M Berrettini	4	3
7	(Italy) J Sinner	6	6

Third round
PR	(France) G Monfils	6	6
LL	(Australia) A Vukic	4	4
(United Kingdom) A Murray
7	(Italy) J Sinner	w/o

Quarterfinals
PR	(France) G Monfils	4	6	3
7	(Italy) J Sinner	6	4	6

=== Bottom half ===
==== Section 3 ====
First round
(United States) M McDonald	6	6
A Karatsev	3	4
(France) A Mannarino	6^{5}	4
Q	(Japan) T Daniel	7^{7}	6
WC	(Canada) M Raonic	6^{12}	7^{7}	6
9	(United States) F Tiafoe	7^{14}	6^{4}	3
13	(Germany) A Zverev	6	7^{7}
(Netherlands) T Griekspoor	4	6^{3}
(Spain) A Davidovich Fokina	6	6
(United States) JJ Wolf	0	2
(United States) B Nakashima	5	6	6^{2}
(Czech Republic) J Lehečka	7	3	7^{7}

Second round
6	A Rublev	4	3
(United States) M McDonald	6	6
Q	(Japan) T Daniel	4	3
WC	(Canada) M Raonic	6	6
13	(Germany) A Zverev	1	2
(Spain) A Davidovich Fokina	6	6
(Czech Republic) J Lehečka	6^{6}	4
3	(Norway) C Ruud	7^{8}	6

Third round
(United States) M McDonald	6	6
WC	(Canada) M Raonic	3	3
(Spain) A Davidovich Fokina	7^{7}	4	7^{7}
3	(Norway) C Ruud	6^{4}	6	6^{4}

Quarterfinals
(United States) M McDonald	4	2
(Spain) A Davidovich Fokina	6	6

==== Section 4 ====
First round
(France) U Humbert	4	6	6
(Chile) N Jarry	6	3	4
WC	(Canada) G Diallo	7^{7}	7
(United Kingdom) D Evans	6^{4}	5
(Australia) A de Minaur	7	6
11	(United Kingdom) C Norrie	5	4
16	(Italy) L Musetti	6	6
(Japan) Y Nishioka	4	1
(China) Z Zhang	5	4
Q	(Australia) T Kokkinakis	7	6
WC	(Canada) V Pospisil	4	4
Q	(Italy) M Arnaldi	6	6

Second round
8	(United States) T Fritz	7^{9}	3	6
(France) U Humbert	6^{7}	6	3
WC	(Canada) G Diallo	4	5
(Australia) A de Minaur	6	7
16	(Italy) L Musetti	4	7	6
Q	(Australia) T Kokkinakis	6	5	4
Q	(Italy) M Arnaldi	2	5
2	D Medvedev	6	7

Third round
8	(United States) T Fritz	6^{7}	6	1
(Australia) A de Minaur	7^{9}	4	6
16	(Italy) L Musetti	4	4
2	D Medvedev	6	6

Quarterfinals
(Australia) A de Minaur	7^{9}	7
2	D Medvedev	6^{7}	5

== Seeded players ==
The following are the seeded players. Seedings are based on ATP rankings as of 31 July 2023. Rank and points before are as of 7 August 2023.

Seed	Rank	Player	Points before	Points defending	Points won	Points after	Status
1	1	(Spain) Carlos Alcaraz	9,225	10	180	9,395	Quarterfinals lost to (United States) Tommy Paul [12]
2	3	Daniil Medvedev	6,360	10	180	6,530	Quarterfinals lost to (Australia) Alex de Minaur
3	5	(Norway) Casper Ruud	4,985	360	90	4,715	Third round lost to (Spain) Alejandro Davidovich Fokina
4	4	(Greece) Stefanos Tsitsipas	5,090	10	10	5,090	Second round lost to (France) Gaël Monfils [PR]
5	6	(Denmark) Holger Rune	4,825	45	10	4,790	Second round lost to (United States) Marcos Giron [Q]
6	7	Andrey Rublev	4,595	10	10	4,595	Second round lost to (United States) Mackenzie McDonald
7	8	(Italy) Jannik Sinner	3,815	90	1,000	4,725	Champion, defeated (Australia) Alex de Minaur
8	9	(United States) Taylor Fritz	3,605	90	90	3,605	Third round lost to (Australia) Alex de Minaur
9	10	(United States) Frances Tiafoe	3,085	45	10	3,050	First round lost to (Canada) Milos Raonic [WC]
10	12	(Canada) Félix Auger-Aliassime	2,680	180	10	2,510	First round lost to (Australia) Max Purcell [Q]
11	13	(United Kingdom) Cameron Norrie	2,505	90	10	2,425	First round lost to (Australia) Alex de Minaur
12	14	(United States) Tommy Paul	2,345	180	360	2,525	Semifinals lost to (Italy) Jannik Sinner [7]
13	16	(Germany) Alexander Zverev	2,265	0	45	2,310	Second round lost to (Spain) Alejandro Davidovich Fokina
14	15	(Croatia) Borna Ćorić	2,315	10	10	2,315	First round lost to (Australia) Aleksandar Vukic [LL]
15	17	(Poland) Hubert Hurkacz	2,195	600	90	1,685	Third round lost to (Spain) Carlos Alcaraz [1]
16	19	(Italy) Lorenzo Musetti	1,950	(45)^{†}	90	1,995	Third round lost to Daniil Medvedev [2]

† The player did not qualify for the event in 2022. Points from his 19th best result will be deducted instead.

=== Withdrawn players ===
The following players would have been seeded, but withdrew before the tournament began.

Rank	Player	Points before	Points defending	Points after	Withdrawal reason
2	(Serbia) Novak Djokovic	8,795	0	8,795	Fatigue
11	Karen Khachanov	2,900	45	2,855	Injury

== Other entry information ==
=== Wild cards ===
- (Canada) Gabriel Diallo
- (Canada) Alexis Galarneau
- (Canada) Vasek Pospisil
- (Canada) Milos Raonic

=== Protected ranking ===
- (France) Gaël Monfils

=== Withdrawals ===
- (Spain) Roberto Bautista Agut → replaced by (France) Grégoire Barrère
- (Spain) Pablo Carreño Busta → replaced by (United States) J. J. Wolf
- (Croatia) Marin Čilić → replaced by (China) Zhang Zhizhen
- (Bulgaria) Grigor Dimitrov → replaced by (Australia) Aleksandar Vukic
- (Serbia) Novak Djokovic → replaced by (United States) Christopher Eubanks
- Karen Khachanov → replaced by Aslan Karatsev
- (Australia) Nick Kyrgios → replaced by (Finland) Emil Ruusuvuori
- (Canada) Denis Shapovalov → replaced by (United States) Mackenzie McDonald
- (Germany) Jan-Lennard Struff → replaced by (Spain) Bernabé Zapata Miralles

== Qualifying ==
=== Seeds ===
1. (Australia) Aleksandar Vukic (qualifying competition, lucky loser)
2. (Italy) Matteo Arnaldi (qualified)
3. (United States) Marcos Giron (qualified)
4. (Australia) Christopher O'Connell (qualifying competition)
5. (Australia) Max Purcell (qualified)
6. (France) Corentin Moutet (qualifying competition)
7. (Australia) Thanasi Kokkinakis (qualified)
8. (Argentina) Diego Schwartzman (qualified)
9. (United States) Maxime Cressy (first round)
10. (Moldova) Radu Albot (qualifying competition)
11. (Japan) Yosuke Watanuki (withdrew)
12. (Chile) Cristian Garín (qualified)
13. (France) Constant Lestienne (qualifying competition)
14. (Japan) Taro Daniel (qualified)

=== Qualifiers ===
1. (Argentina) Diego Schwartzman
2. (Italy) Matteo Arnaldi
3. (United States) Marcos Giron
4. (Chile) Cristian Garín
5. (Australia) Max Purcell
6. (Japan) Taro Daniel
7. (Australia) Thanasi Kokkinakis

=== Lucky loser ===
1. (Australia) Aleksandar Vukic

=== Draw ===
==== First qualifier ====
First round
1	(Australia) Aleksandar Vukic	6	6
WC	(Canada) Dan Martin	3	4
WC	(Canada) Liam Draxl	6^{6}	4
8	(Argentina) Diego Schwartzman	7^{8}	6

Qualifying competition
1	(Australia) Aleksandar Vukic	4	4
8	(Argentina) Diego Schwartzman	6	6

==== Second qualifier ====
First round
2	(Italy) Matteo Arnaldi	6	6
(United States) Aleksandar Kovacevic	4	4
Ilya Ivashka	2	6^{3}
Alt	(Croatia) Matija Pecotić	6	7^{7}

Qualifying competition
2	(Italy) Matteo Arnaldi	6	6
Alt	(Croatia) Matija Pecotić	4	4

==== Third qualifier ====
First round
3	(United States) Marcos Giron	6	3	6
(United States) Nick Chappell	4	6	2
Alt	(India) Mukund Sasikumar	2	5
10	(Moldova) Radu Albot	6	7

Qualifying competition
3	(United States) Marcos Giron	6	6
10	(Moldova) Radu Albot	3	1

==== Fourth qualifier ====
First round
4	(Australia) Christopher O'Connell	6	2	6
PR	(United States) Thai-Son Kwiatkowski	2	6	4
(France) Maxime Janvier	3	3
12	(Chile) Cristian Garín	6	6

Qualifying competition
4	(Australia) Christopher O'Connell	6^{6}	4
12	(Chile) Cristian Garín	7^{8}	6

==== Fifth qualifier ====
First round
5	(Australia) Max Purcell	6	6
PR	(Canada) Peter Polansky	2	4
WC	(Canada) Brayden Schnur	4	7^{7}	7
9	(United States) Maxime Cressy	6	6^{2}	5

Qualifying competition
5	(Australia) Max Purcell	6	6
WC	(Canada) Brayden Schnur	2	1

==== Sixth qualifier ====
First round
6	(France) Corentin Moutet	6	6
WC	(Canada) Justin Boulais	0	3
(Australia) Dane Sweeny	6^{4}	5
14	(Japan) Taro Daniel	7^{7}	7

Qualifying competition
6	(France) Corentin Moutet	6^{8}	2
14	(Japan) Taro Daniel	7^{10}	6

==== Seventh qualifier ====
First round
7	(Australia) Thanasi Kokkinakis	7^{7}	4	7
(Croatia) Borna Gojo	6^{4}	6	5
(Australia) James Duckworth	1	6	4
13	(France) Constant Lestienne	6	2	6

Qualifying competition
7	(Australia) Thanasi Kokkinakis	7^{8}	6
13	(France) Constant Lestienne	6^{6}	3
