= 2018 Internazionali di Tennis d'Abruzzo – Singles =

Singles
- 2018 Internazionali di Tennis d'Abruzzo

Final
- Champion: (Italy) Gianluigi Quinzi
- Runner-up: (Norway) Casper Ruud
- Score: 6–4, 6–1

Events
Singles	Doubles
- Internazionali di Tennis d'Abruzzo

Pedro Sousa was the defending champion but chose not to defend his title.

Gianluigi Quinzi won the title after defeating Casper Ruud 6–4, 6–1 in the final.

== Seeds ==
1. (Belgium) Ruben Bemelmans (first round)
2. (Italy) Stefano Travaglia (first round)
3. (Portugal) Gastão Elias (withdrew)
4. (Italy) Simone Bolelli (withdrew)
5. (United Kingdom) Liam Broady (second round)
6. (Canada) Félix Auger-Aliassime (second round)
7. (Croatia) Viktor Galović (second round)
8. (Argentina) Renzo Olivo (second round)
9. (Italy) Salvatore Caruso (first round)

== Draw ==
Key

- Q = Qualifier
- WC = Wild card
- LL = Lucky loser
- Alt = Alternate
- ITF = ITF entry
- PR = Protected ranking
- SR = Special ranking
- SE = Special exempt
- JE = Junior exempt
- JR = Junior Accelerator Programme entrant
- CO = College Accelerator Programme entrant
- NG = Next Gen Accelerator Program entrant
- w/o = Walkover
- r = Retired
- d = Defaulted

=== Finals ===
Semifinals
(Netherlands) Tallon Griekspoor	4	2
WC	(Italy) Gianluigi Quinzi	6	6
(Norway) Casper Ruud	7	6
Q	(France) Antoine Hoang	5	4

Final
WC	(Italy) Gianluigi Quinzi	6	6
(Norway) Casper Ruud	4	1

=== Top half ===
First round
1	(Belgium) R Bemelmans	4	4
LL	(Belgium) K Coppejans	6	6
(Argentina) A Collarini	6	7^{8}
WC	(Italy) GM Moroni	2	6^{6}
(Netherlands) T Griekspoor	6	3	6
(Bosnia and Herzegovina) T Brkić	2	6	3
(Czech Republic) L Rosol	7^{7}	3	4
8	(Argentina) R Olivo	6^{5}	6	6
Q	(Italy) L Vanni	6	6^{2}	6
LL	(Italy) M Viola	2	7^{7}	4
WC	(Italy) G Quinzi	6	6
Q	(Belgium) J De Loore	4	3
LL	(France) E Benchetrit	6^{2}	6	4
WC	(Italy) A Pellegrino	7^{7}	3	6
LL	(China) Zh Zhang	1	4
7	(Croatia) V Galović	6	6

Second round
LL	(Belgium) K Coppejans	6	3	7
(Argentina) A Collarini	4	6	5
(Netherlands) T Griekspoor	7^{9}	6
8	(Argentina) R Olivo	6^{7}	4
Q	(Italy) L Vanni	6^{2}	2
WC	(Italy) G Quinzi	7^{7}	6
WC	(Italy) A Pellegrino	6	2	6
7	(Croatia) V Galović	3	6	3

Quarterfinals
LL	(Belgium) K Coppejans	0	1
(Netherlands) T Griekspoor	6	6
WC	(Italy) G Quinzi	6	5	6
WC	(Italy) A Pellegrino	4	7	2

Semifinals
(Netherlands) T Griekspoor	4	2
WC	(Italy) G Quinzi	6	6

=== Bottom half ===
First round
6	(Canada) F Auger-Aliassime	7	7^{7}
Q	(Bulgaria) D Kuzmanov	5	6^{2}
(Norway) C Ruud	7	2	6
(Belgium) A De Greef	5	6	1
(Croatia) N Serdarušić	3	2
(France) M Bourgue	6	6
(Italy) M Donati	6	6
9	(Italy) S Caruso	0	3
5	(United Kingdom) L Broady	6	2	7
(Czech Republic) Z Kolář	0	6	5
WC	(Italy) F Baldi	6	2	6
(Portugal) J Domingues	2	6	3
(India) S Nagal	4	2
Q	(France) A Hoang	6	6
(Portugal) G Oliveira	6	6
2	(Italy) S Travaglia	0	1

Second round
6	(Canada) F Auger-Aliassime	5	0
(Norway) C Ruud	7	6
(France) M Bourgue	4	6	4
(Italy) M Donati	6	2	6
5	(United Kingdom) L Broady	6^{8}	1
WC	(Italy) F Baldi	7^{10}	6
Q	(France) A Hoang	6	3	6
(Portugal) G Oliveira	1	6	3

Quarterfinals
(Norway) C Ruud	6^{6}	6	7
(Italy) M Donati	7^{8}	4	5
WC	(Italy) F Baldi	4	5
Q	(France) A Hoang	6	7

Semifinals
(Norway) C Ruud	7	6
Q	(France) A Hoang	5	4
