= Jacopo Berrettini =

Italian tennis player (born 1998)

- Country (sports): Italy
- Residence: Rome, Italy
- Born: 27 November 1998 (age 27) Rome, Italy
- Height: 1.91 m (6 ft 3 in)
- Turned pro: 2016
- Coach: Marco Gulisano
- Prize money: $220,596

Singles
- Career record: 1–1
- Career titles: 0
- Highest ranking: No. 298 (17 November 2025)
- Current ranking: No. 298 (17 November 2025)

Doubles
- Career record: 2–2
- Career titles: 0
- Highest ranking: No. 282 (12 September 2019)
- Current ranking: No. 1,202 (17 November 2025)
Medal record
Mediterranean Games
| Bronze medal – third place | 2018 Tarragona | Men's singles |
- Last updated on: 17 November 2025.

Jacopo Berrettini (born 27 November 1998) is an Italian tennis player. Berrettini has a career-high ATP singles ranking of No. 298 achieved 17 November 2025 and a career-high ATP doubles ranking of No. 282 achieved on 13 September 2019.

== Personal life ==
He is the younger brother of former top-10 tennis player Matteo Berrettini.

== Career ==
=== 2021: ATP debut in doubles ===
Berrettini debuted his ATP main draw at the 2021 Sardegna Open in the doubles draw, partnering with his older brother Matteo after receiving a wildcard. The pair reached the semifinals, where Simone Bolelli and Andrés Molteni defeated them.

=== 2023: ATP debut and first win in singles ===
In February, ranked No. 842, after receiving a wildcard for the qualifying draw of the Mexican Open, Berrettini managed to qualify for the main draw by defeating Geoffrey Blancaneaux and Luciano Darderi. He recorded his first ATP win when his opponent, Oscar Otte, retired in the third set. As a result, he moved more than 350 positions back up to the top 500 on 6 March 2023.

=== 2024: Maiden Challenger final, top 350 ===
In April 2024, ranked No. 878, he received a wildcard and reached a Challenger semifinal in Barletta, Italy, losing to top seed Harold Mayot. As a result, he moved back into the top 760 in the rankings on 8 April 2024.

Berrettini reached his maiden Challenger final at the Francavilla al Mare Open, where he lost to Titouan Droguet. As a result, he moved more than 250 positions back up to the top 540 in the singles rankings on 20 May 2024 and another 100 positions, reaching No. 447 two months later on 15 July 2024.

Following a quarterfinal showing at the 2024 Szczecin Open, he reached the top 350 in the rankings on 26 September 2024.

=== 2025: Four M25 titles ===
He participated at different tournaments in India where he didn't reach no more than the second round of qualifying. Then he moved to the European clay courts of Zadar, Naples, Barletta, Monza, Rome, Ostrava and Francavilla where he didn't reach no more than the second round.

In May he finally reached his first ITF25 final of the year in Cervia, he won the final match against Filippo Romano. The next week he made the same result in the ITF25 tournament of Cordoba.

He continued in the summer to do not reach no more than the second round in the tournaments of Sassuolo and Milan. He finally reached the semifinal in the Troyes tournament where he lost against the French tennis player Calvin Hemery. He continued his clay season on the courts of the tournaments of Gandia, Liberec, Augsburg, Como and Tulln.

In September he reached his third final and title at the ITF25 tournament of Santa Margherita against Daniel Michalski. Then he Lost at the First round at Hersonnissos and Hamburg.

In November the played in Tunisia and reached the final, playing and winning three of five matches at the third set. In the final he won against Tiago Pereira in two sets, winning his fourth title M25 of the season and seventh of his career.

== ATP Challenger and ITF Tour finals ==
=== Singles: 12 (7–5) ===
| Legend (singles) ATP Challenger Tour (0–1) Futures/ITF World Tennis Tour (7–4) | Finals by surface Hard (0–1) Clay (7–4) Grass (0–0) Carpet (0–0) |

| Result | W–L | Date | Tournament | Tier | Surface | Opponent | Score |
|---|---|---|---|---|---|---|---|
| Win | 1–0 | May 2018 | Italy F12, Reggio Emilia | Futures | Clay | (Italy) Marco Bortolotti | 0–6, 6–1, 7–5 |
| Win | 2–0 | Aug 2018 | Switzerland F3, Sion | Futures | Clay | (Switzerland) Johan Nikles | 7–5, 6–4 |
| Loss | 2–1 | Oct 2018 | Italy F31, Pula | Futures | Clay | (Romania) Nicolae Frunză | 4–6, 3–6 |
| Loss | 2–2 | Oct 2018 | Egypt M15, Sharm El Sheikh | Futures | Hard | (Slovakia) Lukáš Klein | 4–6, 4–6 |
| Loss | 2–3 | Aug 2020 | Netherlands M15, Alkmaar | Futures | Clay | (Netherlands) Igor Sijsling | 2–6, 1–6 |
| Loss | 2–4 | Jun 2022 | Netherlands M15, Alkmaar | Futures | Clay | (Spain) Daniel Rincon | 5–7, 1–6 |
| Loss | 2–5 | May 2024 | Francavilla al Mare, Italy | Challenger | Clay | (France) Titouan Droguet | 3–6, 6–7^{(4–7)} |
| Win | 3–5 | Jul 2024 | M25 Bolzano, Italy | WTT | Clay | (Italy) Gianmarco Ferrari | 6–1, 6–3 |
| Win | 4–5 | May 2025 | M25 Cervia, Italy | WTT | Clay | (Italy) Filippo Romano | 7–6^{(7–2)}, 6–2 |
| Win | 5–5 | Jun 2025 | M25 Córdoba, Spain | WTT | Clay | (Italy) Raul Brancaccio | 4–6, 7–6^{(7–2)}, 6–4 |
| Win | 6–5 | Sep 2025 | M25 Santa Margherita di Pula, Italy | WTT | Clay | (Poland) Daniel Michalski | 6–1, 7–5 |
| Win | 7–5 | Nov 2025 | M25 Monastir, Tunisia | WTT | Clay | (Portugal) Tiago Pereira | 7–6^{(7–3)}, 6–2 |

=== Doubles: 13 (7–6) ===
| Legend (doubles) ATP Challenger Tour (2–1) Futures/ITF World Tennis Tour (5-5) | Finals by surface Hard (5–3) Clay (2–3) Grass (0–0) Carpet (0–0) |

| Result | W–L | Date | Tournament | Tier | Surface | Partner | Opponents | Score |
|---|---|---|---|---|---|---|---|---|
| Loss | 0–1 | Sep 2019 | Italy M25, Pula | Futures | Clay | (Italy) Alessandro Petrone | (Netherlands) Thiemo de Bakker (France) Clément Tabur | 6–2, 1–6, [7–10] |
| Win | 1–1 | Sep 2019 | Italy M25, Pula | Futures | Clay | (Italy) Matteo Arnaldi | (Italy) Luciano Darderi (Italy) Francesco Maestrelli | 6–2, 6–2 |
| Win | 2–1 | Oct 2019 | Egypt M15, Sharm El Sheikh | Futures | Hard | (Italy) Alessandro Bega | (France) Arthur Bernabé (Russia) Boris Pokotilov | 7–6^{(7–5)}, 6–2 |
| Loss | 2–2 | Feb 2021 | Turkey M15, Antalya | Futures | Clay | (Italy) Raúl Brancaccio | (Portugal) Nuno Borges (United States) Alex Rybakov | 6–4, 6–7^{(1–7)}, [6–10] |
| Win | 3–2 | Mar 2021 | Egypt M15, Sharm El Sheikh | Futures | Hard | (Italy) Luca Nardi | (Chinese Taipei) Hsu Yu-hsiou (Japan) Shintaro Imai | 6–3, 2–6, [10–7] |
| Win | 4–2 | Mar 2021 | Egypt M15, Sharm El Sheikh | Futures | Hard | (Italy) Francesco Vilardo | (Austria) Lucas Miedler (Bosnia and Herzegovina) Aldin Šetkić | 6–2, 6–7^{(1–7)}, [10–8] |
| Win | 5–2 | Mar 2021 | Egypt M15, Sharm El Sheikh | Futures | Hard | (Austria) Neil Oberleitner | (Japan) Takuto Niki (Japan) Yusuke Takahashi | 6–3, 6–3 |
| Loss | 5–3 | Nov 2022 | Egypt M25, Sharm El Sheikh | WTT | Hard | (Italy) Francesco Forti | (South Korea) Jeong Yeong-seok (South Korea) Park Ui-sung | 1–6, 6–7^{(9–11)} |
| Loss | 5–4 | Jan 2023 | Qatar M15, Doha | WTT | Hard | (Estonia) Kristjan Tamm | (India) Parikshit Somani (Uzbekistan) Khumoyun Sultanov | 6–7^{(3–7)}, 2–6 |
| Loss | 5–5 | Feb 2023 | M25 Vila Real de Santo António, Portugal | WTT | Hard | (Italy) Federico Gaio | (Belgium) Simon Beaupain (Argentina) Juan Bautista Otegui | 2–6, 6–4, [8–10] |
| Win | 6–5 | Apr 2023 | Barletta, Italy | Challenger | Clay | (Italy) Flavio Cobolli | (Czech Republic) Zdeněk Kolář (Ukraine) Denys Molchanov | 1–6, 7–5, [10–6] |
| Loss | 6–6 | Apr 2023 | Roseto degli Abruzzi, Italy | Challenger | Clay | (Italy) Andrea Pellegrino | (France) Dan Added (France) Titouan Droguet | 2–6, 6–1, [10–12] |
| Win | 7–6 | Mar 2026 | Hersonissos, Greece | Challenger | Hard | (Belgium) Kimmer Coppejans | (United Kingdom) Finn Bass (Bulgaria) Anthony Genov | 3–6, 6–1, [10–3]. |
