= Matteo Arnaldi =

Italian tennis player (born 2001)

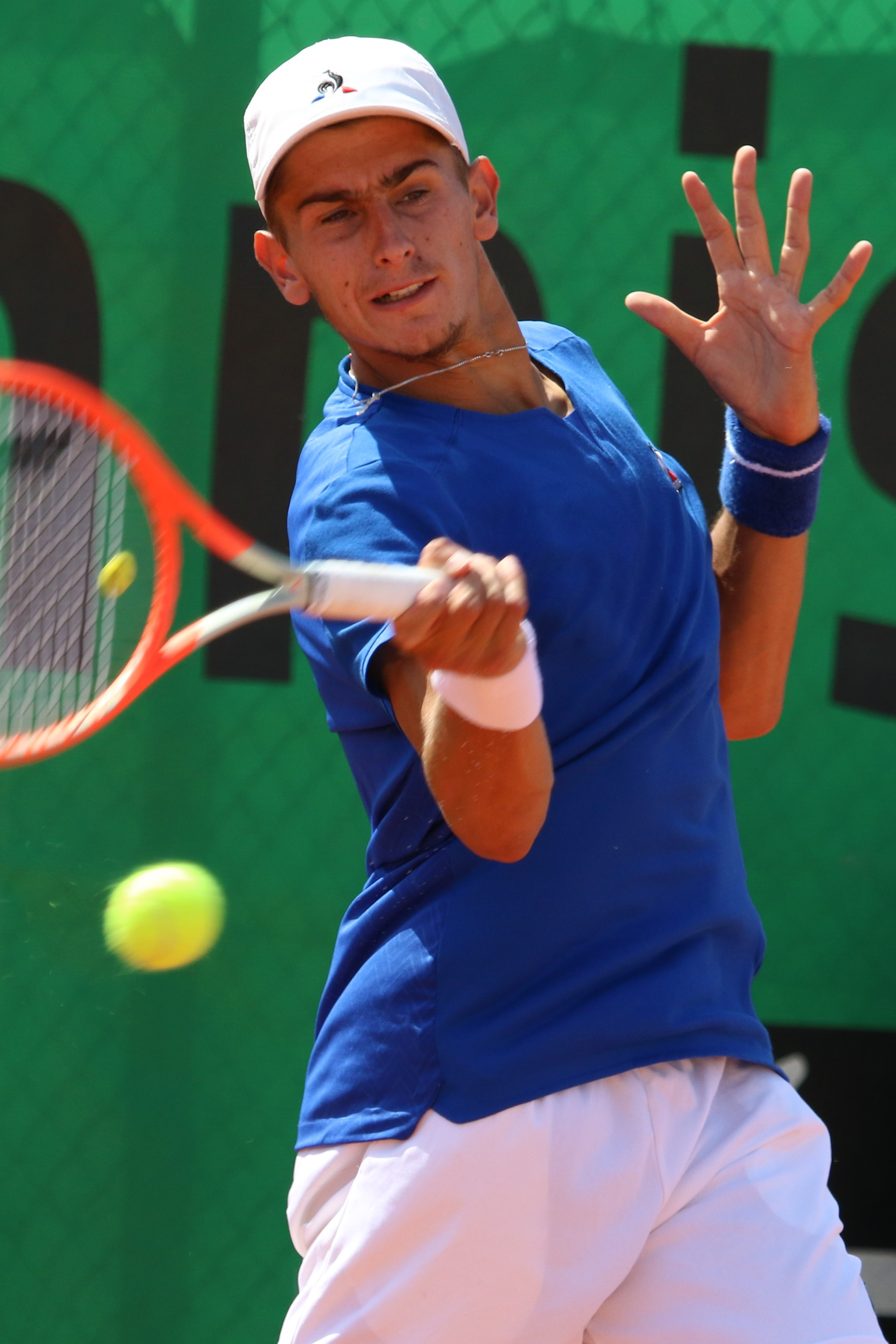
- Arnaldi at the 2022 Internationaux de Blois
- Country (sports): Italy
- Born: 22 February 2001 (age 25) Sanremo, Italy
- Height: 1.85 m (6 ft 1 in)
- Turned pro: 2019
- Plays: Right-handed (two-handed backhand)
- Coach: Alessandro Petrone; Jean-Marcel Du Coudray; Fabio Colangelo (Apr 2026–), Matteo Civarolo
- Prize money: US $6,045,110

Singles
- Career record: 77–80
- Career titles: 0
- Highest ranking: No. 30 (12 August 2024)
- Current ranking: No. 38 (9 November 2026)

Grand Slam singles results
- Australian Open: 2R (2024)
- French Open: SF (2026)
- Wimbledon: 1R (2023, 2024, 2025, 2026)
- US Open: 4R (2023)

Other tournaments
- Olympic Games: 2R (2024)

Doubles
- Career record: 3–11
- Career titles: 0
- Highest ranking: No. 286 (8 August 2022)
- Current ranking: No. 587 (31 August 2026)

Grand Slam doubles results
- Australian Open: 1R (2024)
- US Open: 2R (2023, 2026)

Team competitions
- Davis Cup: W (2023); Record: 3–2
Medal record
Mediterranean Games
Gold medal – first place	2022 Oran	Men's Doubles
- Last updated on: 31 August 2026.

Matteo Arnaldi (born 22 February 2001) is an Italian professional tennis player. He has a career high ATP singles ranking of world No. 30, achieved in August 2024, and a doubles ranking of No. 286, reached in August 2022. He is currently the No. 5 singles player from Italy. Arnaldi's best performance at the majors is reaching the semifinals at the 2026 French Open. Arnaldi was part of the victorious Italian team at the 2023 Davis Cup. He also won the gold medal at the 2022 Mediterranean Games in men's doubles.

== Career ==
=== 2022: ATP debut, first Challenger title ===
Arnaldi made his ATP Tour main-draw debut at the 2022 Italian Open after winning the pre-qualification wildcard tournament. He lost to Marin Čilić in the first round.

Arnaldi won his maiden ATP Challenger title at the Internazionali di Tennis d'Abruzzo as a wildcard entrant defeating Francesco Maestrelli.

Following Holger Rune's withdrawal to be first alternate at the 2022 ATP Finals, Arnaldi gained entry to participate in the 2022 Next Generation ATP Finals, where he lost all three of his group matches.

=== 2023: Major debut, Davis Cup champ ===
After his third Challenger title win at the Murcia Open, Arnaldi reached a career-high ATP ranking of No. 102 on 10 April 2023.

He qualified for the ATP 500 Barcelona Open and won his first match against Jaume Munar, before losing to 12th seed Dan Evans in the second round.

Arnaldi also qualified for the Madrid Open and won his first Masters 1000 match over fellow qualifier Benoit Paire Next, he upset world No. 4 Casper Ruud in straight sets for his first career top-10 win to reach the third round, at which point he lost to Jaume Munar in three sets. As a result of his run he made his debut into the top 100 at No. 99 in the rankings on 8 May 2023.

He received a wildcard entry for the main-draw at the Italian Open, where he defeated Diego Schwartzman, before losing to fellow Italian and 18th seed Lorenzo Musetti in the second round.

Arnaldi qualified to make his Grand Slam main-draw debut at the French Open and recorded a win over Daniel Elahi Galán to reach the second round, where he lost to 26th seed Denis Shapovalov. He also made his debut at Wimbledon, losing to Roberto Carballés Baena in the first round.

In Umag, Arnaldi defeated qualifier Jesper de Jong, qualifier Flavio Cobolli and top seed Jiří Lehečka to reach his first ATP semifinal, which he lost to eventual champion Alexei Popyrin in a match lasting more than three hours.

At the Canadian Open, Arnaldi qualified and defeated wildcard entrant Vasek Pospisil in the first round, then fell to world No. 3 Daniil Medvedev in the second. At the US Open, wins over Jason Kubler, Arthur Fils and 16th seed Cameron Norrie saw him reach the fourth round, where his run was ended by world No. 1 Carlos Alcaraz. Despite this loss, he reached the world's top 50 at No. 47 on 11 September 2023.

At the start of the Asian swing of the season he qualified for the ATP 500 China Open and reached the second round defeating fellow qualifier JJ Wolf, before losing to Nicolás Jarry. At the Shanghai Masters he defeated Alexei Popyrin and 21st seed Jan-Lennard Struff to reach the third round, at which point he lost to JJ Wolf.

In November, Arnaldi was part of the Italy team which won the Davis Cup, defeating Alexei Popyrin in the opening singles match of the final.

=== 2024: French success, ATP 1000 semis ===
Arnaldi recorded his first win at the Australian Open defeating wildcard entrant Adam Walton, before losing to 10th seed Alex de Minaur in the second round.

Ranked No. 43 at the Delray Beach Open he defeated Yoshihito Nishioka firing 21 aces and recording 50 winners, only to lose his next match against Rinky Hijikata in three sets. At the Indian Wells Open he reached the second round by defeating Luca Van Assche, before losing to before losing to second seed Carlos Alcaraz. At the Miami Open he defeated Arthur Fils 17th seed Alexander Bublik and Denis Shapovalov to reach the fourth round of a Masters for the first time, at which point he lost to Tomáš Macháč.

At the beginning of the clay court season, at the Barcelona Open, he reached the quarterfinals with wins over Arthur Cazaux, eighth seed Sebastian Baez and qualifier Marco Trungelliti. His run was halted by third seed Casper Ruud.

In May, at the French Open, he defeated Arthur Fils, Alexandre Müller and sixth seed Andrey Rublev to reach the fourth round for the first time at this Major, at which stage he was eliminated by Stefanos Tsitsipas.

At the Canadian Open, he reached the semifinals for the first time at a Masters level, defeating qualifier Mackenzie McDonald, 16th seed Karen Khachanov, Alejandro Davidovich Fokina and Kei Nishikori. He lost to Andrey Rublev in straight sets. As a result, he reached to the top 30 in the singles rankings on 12 August 2024.

Seeded 30th at the US Open, Arnaldi registered wins over wildcard entrant Zachary Svajda and Roman Safiullin, before losing to Jordan Thompson in the third round.

=== 2025: Madrid quarterfinal, top 5 win ===
In February at the Dallas Open, Arnaldi defeated qualifier Christopher Eubanks and Alejandro Davidovich Fokina, before losing to Jaume Munar in the quarterfinals. The following week at the Dallas Open, he received a bye as fourth seed and then overcame wildcard entrant Learner Tien and sixth seed Brandon Nakashima to reach the semifinals, at which point he lost to eighth seed Alejandro Davidovich Fokina.

Arnaldi made it through to the third round at Indian Wells with wins over Aleksandar Kovacevic and seventh seed Andrey Rublev and 32nd seed Brandon Nakashima.

In April at the Madrid Open, he defeated qualifier Borna Ćorić, fourth seed and 24-time Grand Slam champion Novak Djokovic, Damir Džumhur and 16th seed Frances Tiafoe to reach the quarterfinals, where he lost to fifth seed Jack Draper.

Seeded eighth at the Geneva Open, Arnaldi recorded wins against Hugo Gaston and Fábián Marozsán to make it into the quarterfinals, at which stage he lost to second seed Novak Djokovic.

=== 2026: First major semifinal, fifth Challenger title ===
In April at the Monte-Carlo Masters, Arnaldi entered the main-draw as a lucky loser, but was eliminated by qualifier Cristian Garín in the first round. The following month, having entered as an alternate at the Sardegna Open, he won his fifth ATP Challenger title and first since 2023, defeating sixth seed Hubert Hurkacz in the final. Entering as a wildcard at the Italian Open, Arnaldi defeated Jaume Munar and sixth seed Alex De Minaur to reach the third round, where he lost to 32nd seed Rafael Jodar.

At the French Open, Arnaldi defeated 29th seed Tallon Griekspoor, Stefanos Tsitsipas and Raphael Collignon to progress to the fourth round, where he overcame 19th seed Frances Tiafoe in a five set match lasting five hours and 26 minutes to make it through to his first major quarterfinal. He then advanced to the semifinals when his opponent in the last eight, fellow Italian Matteo Berrettini, retired due to injury with Arnaldi leading by a set and a break of serve. Arnaldi withdrew from the tournament before his semifinal against another fellow Italian, 10th seed Flavio Cobolli, because of illness.

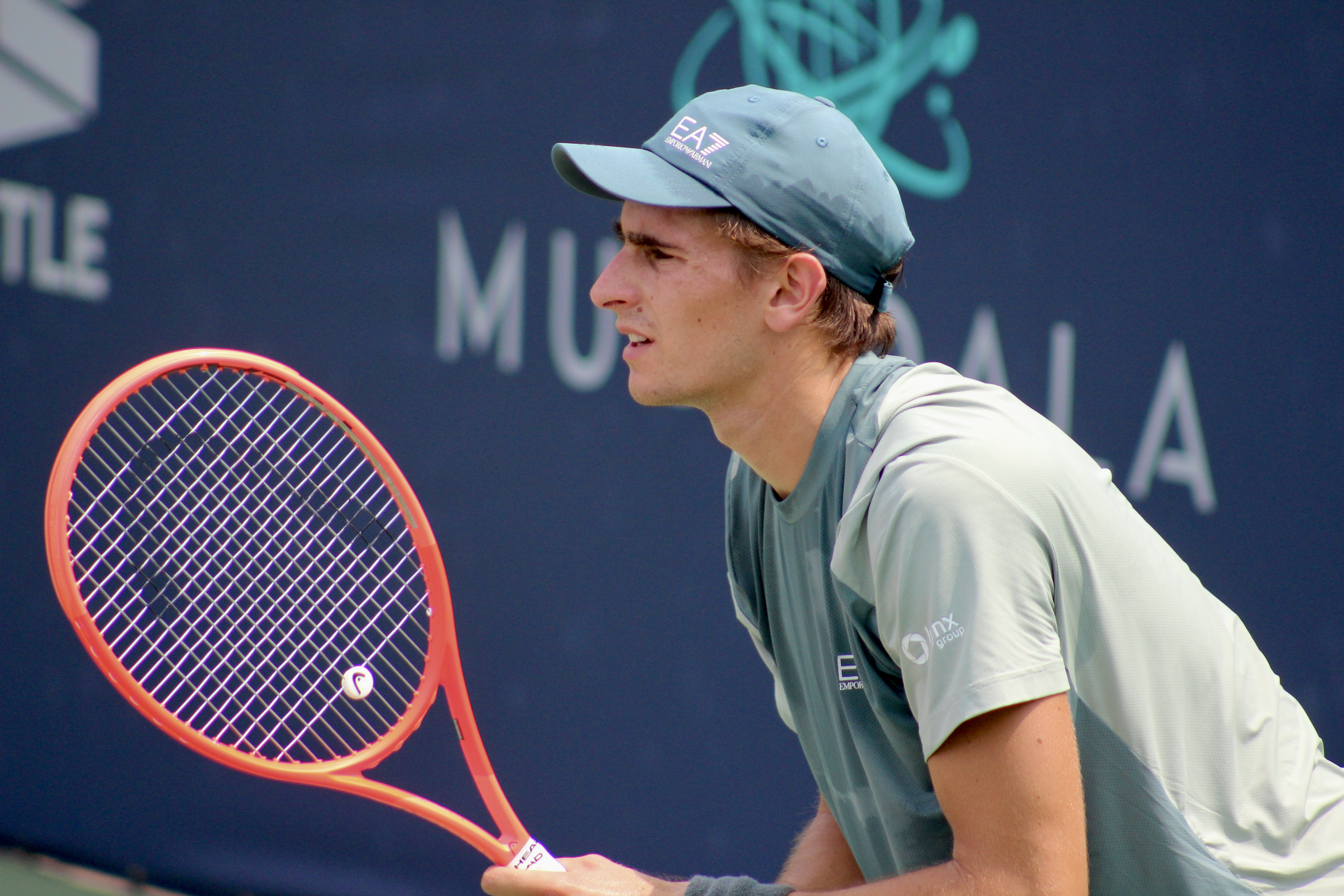
Arnaldi at DC Open, July 27, 2026

== Performance timeline ==
Key
W	F	SF	QF	#R	RR	Q#	P#	DNQ	A	Z#	PO	G	S	B	NMS	NTI	P	NH

(W) winner; (F) finalist; (SF) semifinalist; (QF) quarterfinalist; (#R) rounds 4, 3, 2, 1; (RR) round-robin stage; (Q#) qualification round; (P#) preliminary round; (DNQ) did not qualify; (A) absent; (Z#) Davis/Fed Cup Zonal Group (with number indication) or (PO) play-off; (G) gold, (S) silver or (B) bronze Olympic/Paralympic medal; (NMS) not a Masters tournament; (NTI) not a Tier I tournament; (P) postponed; (NH) not held; (SR) strike rate (events won / competed); (W–L) win–loss record.
To avoid confusion and double counting, these charts are updated at the conclusion of a tournament or when the player's participation has ended.

Tournament	2020	2021	2022	2023	2024	2025	2026	SR	W–L	Win%
Grand Slam tournaments
Australian Open	A	A	A	Q3	2R	1R	1R	0 / 3	1–3	33%
French Open	A	A	A	2R	4R	2R	SF (Note: Withdrew during the tournament. Not counted as a loss)	0 / 4	10–3	77%
Wimbledon	NH	A	Q1	1R	1R	1R	1R	0 / 4	0–4	0%
US Open	A	A	Q3	4R	3R	1R	1R	0 / 4	5–4	63%
Win–loss	0–0	0–0	0–0	4–3	6–4	1–4	5–2	0 / 14	16–14	53%
National representation
Summer Olympics	NH	A	NH		2R	NH		0 / 1	1–1	50%
ATP 1000 tournaments
Indian Wells Open	NH	A	A	Q2	2R	3R	1R	0 / 3	3–3	50%
Miami Open	NH	A	A	Q1	4R	2R	1R	0 / 3	4–3	57%
Monte-Carlo Masters	NH	A	A	A	1R	1R	1R	0 / 3	0–3	0%
Madrid Open	NH	A	A	3R	2R	QF	Q1	0 / 3	7–3	70%
Italian Open	A	A	1R	2R	2R	1R	3R	0 / 5	4–5	44%
Canadian Open	NH	A	A	2R	SF	3R	3R	0 / 4	8–4	67%
Cincinnati Open	A	A	A	Q1	1R	1R	2R	0 / 3	0–3	0%
Shanghai Masters	NH			3R	3R	2R	2R	0 / 4	5-4	57%
Paris Masters	A	A	A	A	1R	Q1	1R	0 / 2	0–2	0%
Win–loss	0–0	0–0	0–1	6–4	11–9	9–8	2–4	0 / 26	28–26	52%
Career statistics
Tournaments	0	0	2	14	25	21	11	73		
Overall win–loss	0–0	0–0	0–4	20–15	28–25	20–24	7–8	75–76		
Year-end ranking	998	363	134	44	37	61		50%		

== ATP Challenger and ITF Futures finals ==
=== Singles 11 (7–4) ===
Legend ATP Challenger (5–2) ITF Futures (2–2)	Finals by surface Hard (1–1) Clay (6–3) Grass (0–0)

Result	W–L	Date	Category	Tournament	Surface	Opponent	Score
Loss	0–1	Jul 2021	Futures	M25 Casinalbo, Italy	Clay	(Italy) Franco Agamenone	4–6, 5–7
Win	1–1	Aug 2021	Futures	M25 Bolzano, Italy	Clay	(Italy) Alexander Weis	6–0, 6–1
Loss	1–2	Sep 2021	Futures	M25 Eupen, Belgium	Clay	(Argentina) Facundo Diaz Acosta	6–7^{(6–8)}, 2–6
Win	2–2	Oct 2021	Futures	M25 Skopje, North Macedonia	Clay	(Germany) Louis Wessels	6–1, 6–0
Win	3–2	May 2022	Challenger	Francavilla al Mare, Italy	Clay	(Italy) Francesco Maestrelli	6–3, 6–7^{(7–9)}, 6–4
Loss	3–3	Aug 2022	Challenger	San Marino, San Marino	Clay	Pavel Kotov	6–7^{(5–7)}, 4–6
Loss	3–4	Oct 2022	Challenger	Saint-Tropez, France	Hard	(Italy) Mattia Bellucci	3–6, 3–6
Win	4–4	Feb 2023	Challenger	Tenerife, Spain	Hard	(Italy) Raúl Brancaccio	6–1, 6–2
Win	5–4	Apr 2023	Challenger	Murcia, Spain	Clay	(Croatia) Borna Gojo	6–4, 7–6^{(7–4)}
Win	6–4	Jun 2023	Challenger	Heilbronn, Germany	Clay	(Argentina) Facundo Diaz Acosta	7–6^{(7–4)}, 6–1
Win	7–4	May 2026	Challenger	Cagliari, Italy	Clay	(Poland) Hubert Hurkacz	6–4, 6–4

=== Doubles 2 (1–1) ===
Legend ATP Challenger (0–1) ITF Futures (1–0)	Finals by surface Hard (0–0) Clay (1–1) Grass (0–0)

Result	W–L	Date	Category	Tournament	Surface	Partner	Opponent	Score
Win	1–0	Sep 2019	Futures	M25 Pula, Italy	Clay	(Italy) Jacopo Berrettini	(Italy) Luciano Darderi (Italy) Francesco Maestrelli	6–2, 6–2
Loss	1–1	Mar 2023	Challenger	Las Palmas, Spain	Clay	(Italy) Luciano Darderi	(France) Sadio Doumbia (France) Fabien Reboul	7–5, 4–6, [7–10]

== Wins over top 10 players ==
- Matteo Arnaldi has a 6–17 (26.09%) record against players who were, at the time the match was played, ranked in the top 10.

Season	2023	2024	2025	2026	Total
Wins	1	2	2	1	6

#	Player	Rank	Event	Surface	Rd	Score	MAR
2023
1.	(Norway) Casper Ruud	4	Madrid Open, Spain	Clay	2R	6–3, 6–4	105
2024
2.	(United States) Taylor Fritz	10	Mexican Open, Mexico	Hard	1R	6–4, 4–6, 6–3	42
3.	Andrey Rublev	6	French Open, France	Clay	3R	7–6^{(8–6)}, 6–2, 6–4	35
2025
4.	Andrey Rublev	8	Indian Wells Open, United States	Hard	2R	6–4, 7–5	35
5.	(Serbia) Novak Djokovic	5	Madrid Open, Spain	Clay	2R	6–3, 6–4	44
2026
6.	(Australia) Alex de Minaur	8	Italian Open, Italy	Clay	2R	4–6, 7–6^{(7–5)}, 6–4	106

*As of 8 May 2026
