= Francavilla al Mare =

Francavilla a Mare
- Comune
- Comune di Francavilla a Mare
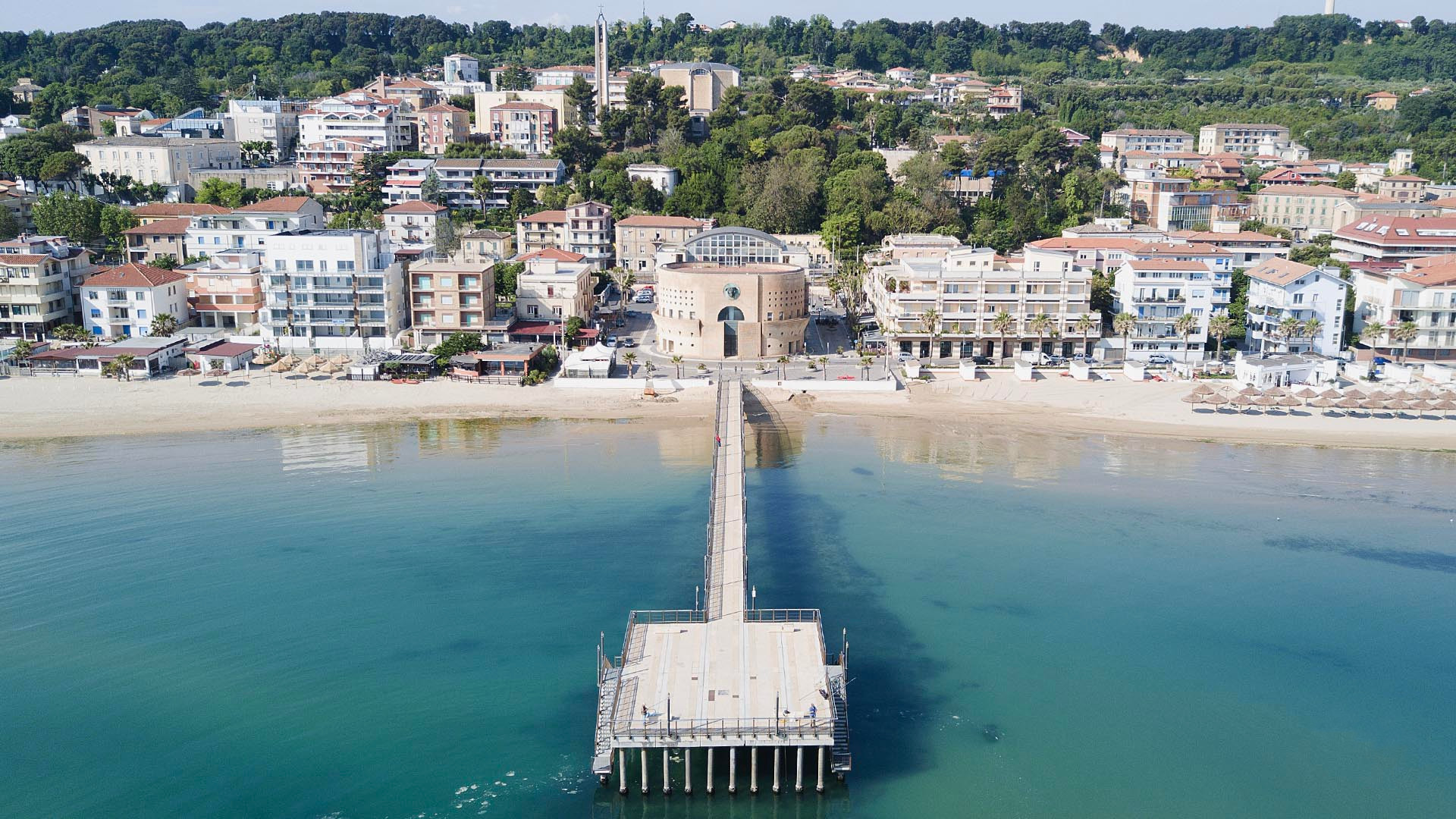

- Coat of arms

- Francavilla within the Province of Chieti

- Location within Italy Location within Abruzzo
- Coordinates: 42°25′N 14°18′E
- Country: Italy
- Region: Abruzzo
- Province: Chieti (CH)
- Frazioni: Arenaro, Castelvecchio, Cese, Cetti San Biagio, Coderuto, Fontechiaro, Foro, Michetti, Piane, Piane di Vallebona, Piattelli, Pretaro, Quercianotarrocco, San Giovanni, Santa Cecilia, Setteventi, Torre Ciarrapico, Valle Anzuca, Villanesi

Government
  - Mayor: Luisa Russo

Area
  - Total: 23.09 km^{2} (8.92 sq mi)
- Elevation: 19 m (62 ft)

Population (1 January 2023)
  - Total: 25,622
  - Density: 1,110/km^{2} (2,874/sq mi)
- Demonym: Francavillesi
- Time zone: UTC+1 (CET)
  - Summer (DST): UTC+2 (CEST)
- Postal code: 66023
- Dialing code: 085
- ISTAT code: 069035
- Patron saint: St. Frank and St. Liberata
- Saint day: 18 August
- Website: Official website

Francavilla al Mare (Italian: [ˌfraŋkaˈvilla al ˈmaːre]) is a comune and town in the province of Chieti, in the Abruzzo region of Italy.

The municipality, included in the urban area of Pescara, borders with Chieti, Miglianico, Ortona, Pescara, Ripa Teatina, San Giovanni Teatino and Torrevecchia Teatina.

== History ==
The area was inhabited since prehistory, and early remains have been found at St. Cecilia. In 1162 the village was granted immunity from taxes for 12 years, and this episode also gave origin to the name "Francavilla" (meaning "free town").

The harbour was a flourishing commercial key point in the Adriatic Sea, but in the 16th century was plundered by Turkish troops. The town was held by families such as the Caracciolo and D'Avalos in the following centuries.

In the late 19th century Francavilla was already a well known seaside resort and the seat of an artistic literary circle with relevant figures as Francesco Paolo Michetti, Gabriele D'Annunzio, F.P. Tosti, who met at the "Conventino", in the former monastery of Santa Maria di Gesù.

In 1944 the centre was destroyed by Americans and Nazi. Only Michetti convent is conserved between the city is totally built from new.

== Main sights ==
- Michetti Convent
- Michetti Museum
- Church of Santa Maria Maggiore
- Sirena Palace

== Sport ==
The local football club is the A.S.D. Francavilla, founded in 1927, that has its home ground in Valle Anzuca Stadium.

== People ==
- Guido Celano (1904–1988), actor
- Francesco Paolo Michetti (1851–1929), painter
- Antonio Russo (1960–2000), journalist
- Vittorio Pomilio (1933–2025), basketball player
