= Francavilla al Mare Open =

Abruzzo Open Francavilla al Mare
- 2025 Abruzzo Open

ATP Challenger Tour
- Event name: Abruzzo Open Francavilla al Mare
- Location: Francavilla al Mare, Italy
- Venue: Circolo Tennis Francavilla al Mare Sporting Club
- Category: ATP Challenger Tour
- Surface: Red Clay
- Draw: 32S/24Q/16D
- Prize money: €97,640 (2026), 32,160 (2022)
- Website: website

The Abruzzo Open Francavilla al Mare (Note: Italian: Internazionali di Tennis Francavilla al Mare) (formerly Francavilla al Mare Open) is a professional tennis tournament played on clay courts. It is currently part of the ATP Challenger Tour. It is held annually in Francavilla al Mare, Italy since 2017.

Igor Zelenay is the doubles record holder with two titles.

== Past finals ==
=== Singles ===
Year	Champion	Runner-up	Score
2026	(Argentina) Facundo Díaz Acosta	(Brazil) Gustavo Heide	5–7, 6–1, 6–2
2025	(Italy) Francesco Maestrelli	(Monaco) Valentin Vacherot	6–4, 6–4
2024	(France) Titouan Droguet	(Italy) Jacopo Berrettini	6–3, 7–6^{(7–4)}
2023	(Chile) Alejandro Tabilo	(France) Benoît Paire	6–1, 7–5
2022	(Italy) Matteo Arnaldi	(Italy) Francesco Maestrelli	6–3, 6–7^{(7–9)}, 6–4
2020– 2021	Not held		
2019	(Italy) Stefano Travaglia	(Germany) Oscar Otte	6–3, 6–7^{(3–7)}, 6–3
2018	(Italy) Gianluigi Quinzi	(Norway) Casper Ruud	6–4, 6–1
2017	(Portugal) Pedro Sousa	(Italy) Alessandro Giannessi	6–3, 7–6^{(7–3)}

=== Doubles ===
Year	Champions	Runners-up	Score
2026	(United States) Benjamin Kittay (United States) Ryan Seggerman	(France) Arthur Reymond (France) Luca Sanchez	6–4, 7–6^{(7–3)}
2025	(Venezuela) Luis David Martínez (Argentina) Facundo Mena	(France) Théo Arribagé (France) Grégoire Jacq	7–5, 2–6, [10–6]
2024	(France) Théo Arribagé (Romania) Victor Vlad Cornea	(Netherlands) Sander Arends (Netherlands) Matwé Middelkoop	7–6^{(7–1)}, 7–6^{(9–7)}
2023	(Colombia) Nicolás Barrientos (Uruguay) Ariel Behar	(Netherlands) Sander Arends (Greece) Petros Tsitsipas	7–6^{(7–1)}, 3–6, [10–6]
2022	(France) Dan Added (Argentina) Hernán Casanova	(Italy) Davide Pozzi (Italy) Augusto Virgili	6–3, 7–5
2020– 2021	Not held		
2019	(Ukraine) Denys Molchanov (Slovakia) Igor Zelenay (2)	(Argentina) Guillermo Durán (Spain) David Vega Hernández	6–3, 6–2
2018	(Italy) Julian Ocleppo (Italy) Andrea Vavassori	(Uruguay) Ariel Behar (Argentina) Máximo González	7–6^{(7–5)}, 7–6^{(7–3)}
2017	(Austria) Julian Knowle (Slovakia) Igor Zelenay (1)	(Australia) Rameez Junaid (Germany) Kevin Krawietz	2–6, 6–2, [10–7]
