= 2023 Sardegna Open – Singles =

Singles
- 2023 Sardegna Open

Final
- Champion: (France) Ugo Humbert
- Runner-up: (Serbia) Laslo Djere
- Score: 4–6, 7–5, 6–4

Events
Singles	Doubles
← 2021 ·	Sardegna Open	· 2024 →

Lorenzo Sonego was the defending champion but chose not to defend his title.

Ugo Humbert won the title after defeating Laslo Djere 4–6, 7–5, 6–4 in the final.

== Seeds ==
The top four seeds received a bye into the second round.

1. (Japan) Yoshihito Nishioka (second round)
2. (United States) Ben Shelton (semifinals)
3. (United States) Mackenzie McDonald (second round)
4. (Serbia) Laslo Djere (final)
5. (Argentina) Diego Schwartzman (first round)
6. (France) Ugo Humbert (champion)
7. (Italy) Marco Cecchinato (withdrew)
8. (Brazil) Thiago Monteiro (first round, retired)

== Draw ==
=== Key ===
- Q = Qualifier
- WC = Wild card
- LL = Lucky loser
- Alt = Alternate
- SE = Special exempt
- PR = Protected ranking
- ITF = ITF entry
- JE = Junior exempt
- w/o = Walkover
- r = Retired
- d = Defaulted
- SR = Special ranking

=== Finals ===
Semifinals
(Colombia) Daniel Elahi Galán	2	6^{3}
6	(France) Ugo Humbert	6	7^{7}
4	(Serbia) Laslo Djere	3	6	6
2	(United States) Ben Shelton	6	3	4

Final
6	(France) Ugo Humbert	4	7	6
4	(Serbia) Laslo Djere	6	5	4

=== Top half ===
First round
WC	(Italy) F Cobolli	7	1	2
(Colombia) DE Galán	5	6	6
Q	(Italy) S Travaglia	3	7^{8}	4
(Croatia) B Gojo	6	6^{6}	6
(Japan) Y Watanuki	6	4
8	(Brazil) T Monteiro	4	2^{r}
(United States) A Kovacevic	1	6	1
(Japan) T Daniel	6	4	6
WC	(Italy) F Maestrelli	6^{7}	4
LL	(Italy) A Pellegrino	7^{9}	6
Q	(Italy) G Mager	4	3
6	(France) U Humbert	6	6

Second round
1	(Japan) Y Nishioka	6	1	4
(Colombia) DE Galán	2	6	6
(Croatia) B Gojo	6	7
(Japan) Y Watanuki	4	5
3	(United States) M McDonald	2	3
(Japan) T Daniel	6	6
LL	(Italy) A Pellegrino	7^{7}	1	1^{r}
6	(France) U Humbert	6^{2}	6	3

Quarterfinals
(Colombia) DE Galán	6	4	6
(Croatia) B Gojo	3	6	3
(Japan) T Daniel	7^{13}	6^{7}	4
6	(France) U Humbert	6^{11}	7^{9}	6

Semifinals
(Colombia) DE Galán	2	6^{3}
6	(France) U Humbert	6	7^{7}

=== Bottom half ===
First round
Q	(Italy) A Giannessi	3	7^{9}	6
(Italy) F Passaro	6	6^{7}	4
(Australia) T Kokkinakis	6	6
(Georgia (country)) N Basilashvili	4	3
Q	(Canada) S Diez	6^{2}	4
Alt	(Slovakia) J Kovalík	7^{7}	6
5	(Argentina) D Schwartzman	6	2	3
Alt	(Italy) M Bellucci	2	6	6
WC	(Italy) A Vavassori	6^{0}	6	4
(Italy) G Zeppieri	7^{7}	4	6
Alt	(Italy) L Nardi	3	6	4
Alt	(Hungary) F Marozsán	6	4	6

Second round
Q	(Italy) A Giannessi	4	2
(Australia) T Kokkinakis	6	6
Alt	(Slovakia) J Kovalík	4	2
4	(Serbia) L Djere	6	6
Alt	(Italy) M Bellucci	2	0
(Italy) G Zeppieri	6	6
Alt	(Hungary) F Marozsán	4	6^{6}
2	(United States) B Shelton	6	7^{8}

Quarterfinals
(Australia) T Kokkinakis	6	1	1
4	(Serbia) L Djere	3	6	6
(Italy) G Zeppieri	4	6	5
2	(United States) B Shelton	6	4	7

Semifinals
4	(Serbia) L Djere	3	6	6
2	(United States) B Shelton	6	3	4
