= 2021 Sardegna Open – Doubles =

Doubles
- 2021 Sardegna Open

Final
- Champions: (Italy) Lorenzo Sonego (Italy) Andrea Vavassori
- Runners-up: (Italy) Simone Bolelli (Argentina) Andrés Molteni
- Score: 6–3, 6–4

Events
Singles	Doubles
← 2020 ·	Sardegna Open	· 2023 →

Marcus Daniell and Philipp Oswald were the defending champions, but chose to compete in Marbella instead.

Lorenzo Sonego and Andrea Vavassori won the title, defeating Simone Bolelli and Andrés Molteni in the final, 6–3, 6–4.

== Seeds ==
1. (Brazil) Marcelo Melo / (Netherlands) Jean-Julien Rojer (first round)
2. (Italy) Simone Bolelli / (Argentina) Andrés Molteni (final)
3. (Australia) Matthew Ebden / (India) Divij Sharan (first round)
4. (United Kingdom) Lloyd Glasspool / (United Kingdom) Jonny O'Mara (first round)

== Draw ==
=== Key ===
- Q = Qualifier
- WC = Wild card
- LL = Lucky loser
- Alt = Alternate
- SE = Special exempt
- PR = Protected ranking
- ITF = ITF entry
- JE = Junior exempt
- w/o = Walkover
- r = Retired
- d = Defaulted
- SR = Special ranking

=== Draw ===
First round
1	(Brazil) M Melo (Netherlands) J-J Rojer	3	6	[6]
(Italy) L Sonego (Italy) A Vavassori	6	3	[10]
WC	(Italy) A Pellegrino (Italy) G Zeppieri	7^{8}	1	[10]
(Georgia (country)) N Basilashvili (Germany) A Begemann	6^{6}	6	[7]
4	(United Kingdom) L Glasspool (United Kingdom) J O'Mara	6	3	[12]
(Italy) M Cecchinato (Italy) S Travaglia	3	6	[14]
(Argentina) F Coria (United Kingdom) D Evans	6	2	[10]
(Finland) H Heliövaara (Ukraine) D Molchanov	4	6	[6]
(Argentina) G Durán (Argentina) G Pella	7	4	[8]
WC	(Italy) J Berrettini (Italy) M Berrettini	5	6	[10]
(Philippines) T Huey (Denmark) F Nielsen	6	6
3	(Australia) M Ebden (India) D Sharan	1	4
PR	(Czech Republic) R Jebavý (Slovakia) I Zelenay	6	3	[8]
(United States) T Fritz (United States) T Paul	2	6	[10]
(United States) N Lammons (United States) J Withrow	5	4
2	(Italy) S Bolelli (Argentina) A Molteni	7	6

Quarterfinals
(Italy) L Sonego (Italy) A Vavassori	6	6
WC	(Italy) A Pellegrino (Italy) G Zeppieri	1	4
(Italy) M Cecchinato (Italy) S Travaglia	2	2
(Argentina) F Coria (United Kingdom) D Evans	6	6
WC	(Italy) J Berrettini (Italy) M Berrettini	7^{7}	6
(Philippines) T Huey (Denmark) F Nielsen	6^{5}	3
(United States) T Fritz (United States) T Paul	0	2
2	(Italy) S Bolelli (Argentina) A Molteni	6	6

Semifinals
(Italy) L Sonego (Italy) A Vavassori	w/o
(Argentina) F Coria (United Kingdom) D Evans
WC	(Italy) J Berrettini (Italy) M Berrettini	3	6	[3]
2	(Italy) S Bolelli (Argentina) A Molteni	6	4	[10]

Final
(Italy) L Sonego (Italy) A Vavassori	6	6
2	(Italy) S Bolelli (Argentina) A Molteni	3	4
