= 2020 Forte Village Sardegna Open – Singles =

Singles
- 2020 Forte Village Sardegna Open

Final
- Champion: (Serbia) Laslo Đere
- Runner-up: (Italy) Marco Cecchinato
- Score: 7–6^{(7–3)}, 7–5

Details
- Draw: 28
- Seeds: 8

Events
Singles	Doubles
Forte Village Sardegna Open	· 2021 →

This was the first edition of the tournament, primarily organised due to the cancellation of many tournaments in 2020, due to the COVID-19 pandemic.

Laslo Đere won the title, defeating Marco Cecchinato in the final, 7–6^{(7–3)}, 7–5.

== Seeds ==
The top four seeds received a bye into the second round.

1. (Italy) Fabio Fognini (withdrew due to testing positive for COVID-19)
2. (Serbia) Dušan Lajović (second round)
3. (Norway) Casper Ruud (second round)
4. (Spain) Albert Ramos Viñolas (quarterfinals)
5. (Italy) Lorenzo Sonego (second round)
6. (Spain) Pablo Andújar (second round)
7. (United States) Tommy Paul (second round)
8. (Uruguay) Pablo Cuevas (first round)

== Draw ==
=== Key ===
- Q = Qualifier
- WC = Wild card
- LL = Lucky loser
- Alt = Alternate
- SE = Special exempt
- PR = Protected ranking
- ITF = ITF entry
- JE = Junior exempt
- w/o = Walkover
- r = Retired
- d = Defaulted
- SR = Special ranking

=== Finals ===
Semifinals
LL	(Serbia) Danilo Petrović	1	0
WC	(Italy) Marco Cecchinato	6	6
WC	(Italy) Lorenzo Musetti	6	2	1^{r}
(Serbia) Laslo Đere	2	6	4

Final
WC	(Italy) Marco Cecchinato	6^{3}	5
(Serbia) Laslo Đere	7^{7}	7

=== Top half ===
First round
(Spain) R Carballés Baena	7	6
Q	(Argentina) F Coria	5	4
(Italy) A Seppi	5	6^{6}
(Argentina) F Delbonis	7	7^{8}
Q	(Slovakia) J Kovalík	5	5
6	(Spain) P Andújar	7	7
(France) C Moutet	7^{7}	6
(United States) F Tiafoe	6^{0}	4
(Italy) G Mager	7	6^{7}	2
WC	(Italy) M Cecchinato	5	7^{9}	6
LL	(Slovakia) A Martin	7	3	5
7	(United States) T Paul	5	6	7

Second round
LL	(Serbia) D Petrović	6	6
(Spain) R Carballés Baena	1	4
(Argentina) F Delbonis	5	7^{7}	6
6	(Spain) P Andújar	7	6^{5}	4
4	(Spain) A Ramos Viñolas	6	6
(France) C Moutet	0	3
WC	(Italy) M Cecchinato	7^{7}	6
7	(United States) T Paul	6^{1}	4

Quarterfinals
LL	(Serbia) D Petrović	7^{7}	6
(Argentina) F Delbonis	6^{3}	1
4	(Spain) A Ramos Viñolas	6	1	1
WC	(Italy) M Cecchinato	4	6	6

Semifinals
LL	(Serbia) D Petrović	1	0
WC	(Italy) M Cecchinato	6	6

=== Bottom half ===
First round
8	(Uruguay) P Cuevas	6^{4}	5
WC	(Italy) L Musetti	7^{7}	7
Q	(Italy) A Pellegrino	4	7^{9}	3
(Italy) S Travaglia	6	6^{7}	0^{r}
(Italy) S Caruso	0	4
(Germany) Y Hanfmann	6	6
5	(Italy) L Sonego	6	7^{7}
WC	(Italy) G Zeppieri	2	6^{4}
(Czech Republic) J Veselý	6	7
(Poland) K Majchrzak	1	5
(Serbia) L Đere	6	6
Q	(India) S Nagal	3	1

Second round
WC	(Italy) L Musetti	6	6
Q	(Italy) A Pellegrino	2	1
(Germany) Y Hanfmann	6	6
3	(Norway) C Ruud	2	1
5	(Italy) L Sonego	4	6	1
(Czech Republic) J Veselý	6	3	6
(Serbia) L Đere	6	7
2	(Serbia) D Lajović	4	5

Quarterfinals
WC	(Italy) L Musetti	6	6
(Germany) Y Hanfmann	2	4
(Czech Republic) J Veselý	4	4
(Serbia) L Đere	6	6

Semifinals
WC	(Italy) L Musetti	6	2	1^{r}
(Serbia) L Đere	2	6	4

== Qualifying ==
=== Seeds ===
1. (Argentina) Federico Coria (qualified)
2. (Slovakia) Andrej Martin (qualifying competition, lucky loser)
3. (Brazil) Thiago Seyboth Wild (first round)
4. (Japan) Taro Daniel (first round)
5. (Slovakia) Jozef Kovalík (qualified)
6. (India) Sumit Nagal (qualified)
7. (Serbia) Danilo Petrović (qualifying competition, lucky loser)
8. (Belgium) Kimmer Coppejans (qualifying competition)

=== Qualifiers ===
1. (Argentina) Federico Coria
2. (India) Sumit Nagal
3. (Italy) Andrea Pellegrino
4. (Slovakia) Jozef Kovalík

=== Lucky losers ===
1. (Slovakia) Andrej Martin
2. (Serbia) Danilo Petrović

=== Qualifying draw ===
==== First qualifier ====
First round
1	(Argentina) Federico Coria	6	1	7^{7}
(Italy) Matteo Viola	2	6	6^{4}
(Italy) Gian Marco Moroni	6	6^{3}	0
8	(Belgium) Kimmer Coppejans	2	7^{7}	6

Qualifying competition
1	(Argentina) Federico Coria	6	6
8	(Belgium) Kimmer Coppejans	1	4

==== Second qualifier ====
First round
2	(Slovakia) Andrej Martin	6	2	6
(United States) JC Aragone	4	6	2
(France) Geoffrey Blancaneaux	3	3
6	(India) Sumit Nagal	6	6

Qualifying competition
2	(Slovakia) Andrej Martin	4	2
6	(India) Sumit Nagal	6	6

==== Third qualifier ====
First round
3	(Brazil) Thiago Seyboth Wild	6	3	2
WC	(Italy) Andrea Pellegrino	4	6	6
(Argentina) Tomás Martín Etcheverry	4	2
7	(Serbia) Danilo Petrović	6	6

Qualifying competition
WC	(Italy) Andrea Pellegrino	7^{7}	3	6
7	(Serbia) Danilo Petrović	6^{5}	6	2

==== Fourth qualifier ====
First round
4	(Japan) Taro Daniel	3	6	4
(Italy) Andrea Arnaboldi	6	2	6
WC	(Italy) Matteo Gigante	4	0
5	(Slovakia) Jozef Kovalík	6	6

Qualifying competition
(Italy) Andrea Arnaboldi	2	4
5	(Slovakia) Jozef Kovalík	6	6
