= 2026 Sardegna Open – Singles =

Singles
- 2026 Sardegna Open

Final
- Champion: (Italy) Matteo Arnaldi
- Runner-up: (Poland) Hubert Hurkacz
- Score: 6–4, 6–4

Events
Singles	Doubles
- Sardegna Open

Mariano Navone was the defending champion but lost in the second round to Matteo Berrettini.

Matteo Arnaldi won the title after defeating Hubert Hurkacz 6–4, 6–4 in the final.

== Seeds ==
The top four seeds received a bye into the second round.

1. (Argentina) Mariano Navone (second round)
2. (France) Adrian Mannarino (second round)
3. (Portugal) Nuno Borges (quarterfinals)
4. (Argentina) Román Andrés Burruchaga (semifinals)
5. (Italy) Lorenzo Sonego (first round)
6. (Poland) Hubert Hurkacz (final)
7. (Argentina) Juan Manuel Cerúndolo (second round)
8. (United States) Marcos Giron (quarterfinals)

== Draw ==
Key

- Q = Qualifier
- WC = Wild card
- LL = Lucky loser
- Alt = Alternate
- ITF = ITF entry
- PR = Protected ranking
- SR = Special ranking
- SE = Special exempt
- JE = Junior exempt
- JR = Junior Accelerator Programme entrant
- CO = College Accelerator Programme entrant
- NG = Next Gen Accelerator Program entrant
- w/o = Walkover
- r = Retired
- d = Defaulted

=== Finals ===
Semifinals
6/WC	(Poland) Hubert Hurkacz	4	7^{7}	6
4	(Argentina) Román Andrés Burruchaga	6	6^{3}	3
Alt	(Italy) Matteo Arnaldi	1	6	6
WC	(Italy) Gianluca Cadenasso	6	1	0

Final
6/WC	(Poland) Hubert Hurkacz	4	4
Alt	(Italy) Matteo Arnaldi	6	6

=== Top half ===
First round
(United States) P Kypson	4	7^{7}	6^{5}
(Italy) M Berrettini	6	6^{5}	7^{7}
(United States) E Nava	6	3
(Bosnia and Herzegovina) D Džumhur	4	0^{r}
(United States) Z Svajda	2	6^{8}
6/WC	(Poland) H Hurkacz	6	7^{10}
Alt	(Italy) A Pellegrino	2	6	6
Q	(Greece) S Sakellaridis	6	4	4
Q	(Italy) Luca Potenza	3	6^{6}
(United States) A Kovacevic	6	7^{8}
(Australia) A Vukic	4	6	1
8	(United States) M Giron	6	1	6

Second round
1	(Argentina) M Navone	5	3
(Italy) M Berrettini	7	6
(United States) E Nava	4	1
6/WC	(Poland) H Hurkacz	6	6
4	(Argentina) RA Burruchaga	6	4	7
Alt	(Italy) A Pellegrino	4	6	5
(United States) A Kovacevic	2	6	4
8	(United States) M Giron	6	3	6

Quarterfinals
(Italy) M Berrettini	6	3	4
6/WC	(Poland) H Hurkacz	4	6	6
4	(Argentina) RA Burruchaga	6	2	7^{7}
8	(United States) M Giron	3	6	6^{1}

Semifinals
6/WC	(Poland) H Hurkacz	4	7^{7}	6
4	(Argentina) RA Burruchaga	6	6^{3}	3

=== Bottom half ===
First round
7	(Argentina) JM Cerúndolo	6^{8}	6	6
WC	(Italy) F Cinà	7^{10}	4	3
Q	(Italy) F Arnaboldi	7^{7}	4	2
Alt	(Italy) M Arnaldi	6^{3}	6	6
Alt	(Tunisia) M Echargui	7^{7}	4	2
Alt	(Chile) C Garín	6^{5}	6	6
5	(Italy) L Sonego	4	6	5
(Italy) M Bellucci	6	1	7
LL	(Italy) Lorenzo Carboni	3	1
WC	(Italy) G Cadenasso	6	6
Alt	(Italy) S Travaglia	7^{7}	3	1
Alt	(Netherlands) J de Jong	6^{4}	6	6

Second round
7	(Argentina) JM Cerúndolo	2	3
Alt	(Italy) M Arnaldi	6	6
Alt	(Chile) C Garín	4	6	6^{6}
3	(Portugal) N Borges	6	3	7^{8}
(Italy) M Bellucci	5	1
WC	(Italy) G Cadenasso	7	6
Alt	(Netherlands) J de Jong	6	3	6
2	(France) A Mannarino	3	6	1

Quarterfinals
Alt	(Italy) M Arnaldi	6	6^{2}	7^{7}
3	(Portugal) N Borges	3	7^{7}	6^{3}
WC	(Italy) G Cadenasso	6	5	6
Alt	(Netherlands) J de Jong	4	7	3

Semifinals
Alt	(Italy) M Arnaldi	1	6	6
WC	(Italy) G Cadenasso	6	1	0
