= 2020 Forte Village Sardegna Open =

- Date: 12–18 October
- Edition: 1st
- Category: ATP Tour 250 Series
- Surface: Clay / outdoor
- Location: Forte Village, Pula, Italy

Champions

Singles
- (Serbia) Laslo Đere

Doubles
- (New Zealand) Marcus Daniell / (Austria) Philipp Oswald
Sardegna Open	· 2021 →

The 2020 Forte Village Sardegna Open was an ATP tournament organised for male professional tennis players, held in Sardinia, Italy, in mid-October 2020 on outdoor clay courts. It was primarily organised due to the cancellation of many tournaments during the 2020 season, because of the ongoing COVID-19 pandemic. It was the first edition of the tournament, and it took place in Pula, Italy, from October 12 through 18, 2020.

== Singles main draw entrants ==
=== Seeds ===
Country	Player	Rank^{1}	Seed
~~ITA~~	~~Fabio Fognini~~	~~15~~	~~1~~
SRB	Dušan Lajović	24	2
NOR	Casper Ruud	25	3
ESP	Albert Ramos Viñolas	44	4
ITA	Lorenzo Sonego	46	5
ESP	Pablo Andújar	51	6
USA	Tommy Paul	58	7
URU	Pablo Cuevas	60	8

- Rankings are as of September 28, 2020.

=== Other entrants ===
The following players received wildcards into the singles main draw:

- (Italy) Marco Cecchinato
- ~~(Italy) Fabio Fognini~~
- (Italy) Lorenzo Musetti
- (Italy) Giulio Zeppieri

The following players received entry from the qualifying draw:

- (Argentina) Federico Coria
- (Slovakia) Jozef Kovalík
- (India) Sumit Nagal
- (Italy) Andrea Pellegrino

The following player received entry as a lucky loser:

- (Slovakia) Andrej Martin
- (Serbia) Danilo Petrović

=== Withdrawals ===
Before the tournament

- (Georgia (country)) Nikoloz Basilashvili → replaced by (Germany) Yannick Hanfmann
- (Chile) Cristian Garín → replaced by (Italy) Gianluca Mager
- (Germany) Philipp Kohlschreiber → replaced by (Spain) Roberto Carballés Baena
- (Argentina) Juan Ignacio Londero → replaced by (Slovakia) Andrej Martin
- (Argentina) Guido Pella → replaced by (Poland) Kamil Majchrzak
- (Argentina) Diego Schwartzman (schedule change) → replaced by (Serbia) Danilo Petrović
- (Portugal) João Sousa → replaced by (Italy) Stefano Travaglia

=== Retirements ===
- (Italy) Stefano Travaglia

== Doubles main draw entrants ==
=== Seeds ===
Country	Player	Country	Player	Rank^{1}	Seed
COL	Juan Sebastián Cabal	COL	Robert Farah	3	1
AUS	John Peers	NZL	Michael Venus	34	2
NZL	Marcus Daniell	AUT	Philipp Oswald	91	3
ITA	Simone Bolelli	ARG	Máximo González	116	4

- Rankings are as of September 20, 2020

=== Other entrants ===
The following pairs received wildcards into the doubles main draw:

- (Italy) Marco Cecchinato / (Italy) Andreas Seppi
- (Kazakhstan) Andrey Golubev / (Kazakhstan) Aleksandr Nedovyesov

=== Withdrawals ===
During the tournament

- (Spain) Pablo Andújar

== Champions ==
All dates and times are CEST (UTC+2)

=== Singles ===
- (Serbia) Laslo Đere def. (Italy) Marco Cecchinato, 7–6^{(7–3)}, 7–5

=== Doubles ===
- (New Zealand) Marcus Daniell / (Austria) Philipp Oswald def. (Colombia) Juan Sebastián Cabal / (Colombia) Robert Farah, 6–3, 6–4
