= 2026 Sardegna Open =

- Date: 28 April – 3 May
- Edition: 5th
- Surface: Clay
- Location: Cagliari, Italy

Champions

Singles
- (Italy) Matteo Arnaldi

Doubles
- (Belgium) Sander Gillé / (Netherlands) Sem Verbeek
- Sardegna Open

The 2026 Sardegna Open was a professional tennis tournament played on clay courts. It was the fifth edition of the tournament and part of the 2026 ATP Challenger Tour. It took place in Cagliari, Italy between 28 April and 3 May 2026.

== Singles main-draw entrants ==
=== Seeds ===
Country	Player	Rank^{1}	Seed
ARG	Mariano Navone	45	1
FRA	Adrian Mannarino	46	2
POR	Nuno Borges	49	3
ARG	Román Andrés Burruchaga	59	4
ITA	Lorenzo Sonego	62	5
POL	Hubert Hurkacz	63	6
ARG	Juan Manuel Cerúndolo	67	7
USA	Marcos Giron	76	8

- ^{1} Rankings as of 20 April 2026.

=== Other entrants ===
The following players received wildcards into the singles main draw:

- (Italy) Gianluca Cadenasso
- (Italy) Federico Cinà
- (Poland) Hubert Hurkacz

The following players received entry into the singles main draw as alternates:

- (Italy) Matteo Arnaldi
- (Netherlands) Jesper de Jong
- (Tunisia) Moez Echargui
- (Chile) Cristian Garín
- (Italy) Andrea Pellegrino
- (Italy) Stefano Travaglia

The following players received entry from the qualifying draw:

- (Italy) Federico Arnaboldi
- (Italy) Luca Potenza
- (Japan) ~~Rei Sakamoto~~
- (Greece) Stefanos Sakellaridis

The following player received entry as a lucky loser:

- (Italy) Lorenzo Carboni

== Champions ==
=== Singles ===
- (Italy) Matteo Arnaldi def. (Poland) Hubert Hurkacz 6–4, 6–4.

=== Doubles ===
- (Belgium) Sander Gillé / (Netherlands) Sem Verbeek def. (Czech Republic) Petr Nouza / (Austria) Neil Oberleitner 4–6, 6–3, [10–4].
