= 2024 Sardegna Open =

- Date: 30 April – 5 May
- Edition: 4th
- Surface: Clay
- Location: Cagliari, Italy

Champions

Singles
- (Argentina) Mariano Navone

Doubles
- (India) Sriram Balaji / (Germany) Andre Begemann
- Sardegna Open

The 2024 Sardegna Open was a professional tennis tournament played on clay courts. It was the fourth edition of the tournament and part of the 2024 ATP Challenger Tour. It took place in Cagliari, Italy between 30 April and 5 May 2024.

== Singles main-draw entrants ==
=== Seeds ===
Country	Player	Rank^{1}	Seed
USA	Frances Tiafoe	21	1
ITA	Lorenzo Musetti	29	2
ARG	Mariano Navone	41	3
USA	Christopher Eubanks	44	4
ITA	Lorenzo Sonego	52	5
HUN	Márton Fucsovics	53	6
POR	Nuno Borges	56	7
ITA	Luciano Darderi	60	8

- ^{1} Rankings as of 22 April 2024.

=== Other entrants ===
The following players received wildcards into the singles main draw:

- (Italy) Francesco Maestrelli
- (United States) Frances Tiafoe
- (Italy) Giulio Zeppieri

The following players received entry into the singles main draw as alternates:

- (Moldova) Radu Albot
- (Italy) Fabio Fognini
- (United States) Emilio Nava
- (Hungary) Zsombor Piros
- (United States) Zachary Svajda
- (Argentina) Camilo Ugo Carabelli
- (Peru) Juan Pablo Varillas

The following players received entry from the qualifying draw:

- (Argentina) Juan Manuel Cerúndolo
- (Netherlands) Jesper de Jong
- (Canada) Gabriel Diallo
- (Japan) Shintaro Mochizuki

== Champions ==
=== Singles ===
- (Argentina) Mariano Navone def. (Italy) Lorenzo Musetti 7–5, 6–1.

=== Doubles ===
- (India) Sriram Balaji / (Germany) Andre Begemann def. (Bolivia) Boris Arias / (Bolivia) Federico Zeballos 6–4, 6–7^{(3–7)}, [10–6].
