= 2024 Sardegna Open – Singles =

Singles
- 2024 Sardegna Open

Final
- Champion: (Argentina) Mariano Navone
- Runner-up: (Italy) Lorenzo Musetti
- Score: 7–5, 6–1

Events
Singles	Doubles
- Sardegna Open

Ugo Humbert was the defending champion but didn't defend his title as he was still competing in the Madrid Masters tournament.

Mariano Navone won the title after defeating Lorenzo Musetti 7–5, 6–1 in the final.

== Seeds ==
The top four seeds received a bye into the second round.

1. (United States) Frances Tiafoe (second round)
2. (Italy) Lorenzo Musetti (final)
3. (Argentina) Mariano Navone (champion)
4. (United States) Christopher Eubanks (second round)
5. (Italy) Lorenzo Sonego (second round)
6. (Hungary) Márton Fucsovics (quarterfinals, withdrew)
7. (Portugal) Nuno Borges (quarterfinals)
8. (Italy) Luciano Darderi (semifinals)

== Draw ==
Key

- Q = Qualifier
- WC = Wild card
- LL = Lucky loser
- Alt = Alternate
- ITF = ITF entry
- PR = Protected ranking
- SR = Special ranking
- SE = Special exempt
- JE = Junior exempt
- JR = Junior Accelerator Programme entrant
- CO = College Accelerator Programme entrant
- NG = Next Gen Accelerator Program entrant
- w/o = Walkover
- r = Retired
- d = Defaulted

=== Finals ===
Semifinals
8	(Italy) Luciano Darderi	3	5
3	(Argentina) Mariano Navone	6	7
(Colombia) Daniel Elahi Galán	1	4
2	(Italy) Lorenzo Musetti	6	6

Final
3	(Argentina) Mariano Navone	7	6
2	(Italy) Lorenzo Musetti	5	1

=== Top half ===
First round
Alt	(Italy) F Fognini	6^{4}	1^{r}
(Argentina) F Coria	7^{7}	3
(Japan) T Daniel	3	4
Alt	(Argentina) C Ugo Carabelli	6	6
(Argentina) TA Tirante	6	3	4
8	(Italy) L Darderi	3	6	6
Q	(Japan) S Mochizuki	6	1	6
(Germany) D Altmaier	4	6	3
Q	(Netherlands) J de Jong	1	3
Alt	(United States) E Nava	6	6
(United States) A Michelsen	3	6	3
5	(Italy) L Sonego	6	2	6

Second round
1/WC	(United States) F Tiafoe	1	5
(Argentina) F Coria	6	7
Alt	(Argentina) C Ugo Carabelli	3	0
8	(Italy) L Darderi	6	6
3	(Argentina) M Navone	6	4	6
Q	(Japan) S Mochizuki	0	6	3
Alt	(United States) E Nava	7^{7}	6
5	(Italy) L Sonego	6^{4}	4

Quarterfinals
(Argentina) F Coria	1	4^{r}
8	(Italy) L Darderi	6	3
3	(Argentina) M Navone	4	6	7^{7}
Alt	(United States) E Nava	6	1	6^{4}

Semifinals
8	(Italy) L Darderi	3	5
3	(Argentina) M Navone	6	7

=== Bottom half ===
First round
6	(Hungary) M Fucsovics	7	4
WC	(Italy) G Zeppieri	5	0^{r}
Alt	(Hungary) Z Piros	6^{5}	0
Alt	(United States) Z Svajda	7^{7}	6
(Colombia) DE Galán	2	7^{7}	6
Alt	(Moldova) R Albot	6	6^{3}	4
7	(Portugal) N Borges	6	7
WC	(Italy) F Maestrelli	3	5
Alt	(Peru) JP Varillas	2	4
(Japan) Y Nishioka	6	6
Q	(Canada) G Diallo	0	6^{4}
Q	(Argentina) JM Cerúndolo	6	7^{7}

Second round
6	(Hungary) M Fucsovics	6	6
Alt	(United States) Z Svajda	3	3
(Colombia) DE Galán	3	6	6
4	(United States) C Eubanks	6	2	2
7	(Portugal) N Borges	6	6^{3}	6
(Japan) Y Nishioka	3	7^{7}	3
Q	(Argentina) JM Cerúndolo	6^{4}	6^{4}
2	(Italy) L Musetti	7^{7}	7^{7}

Quarterfinals
6	(Hungary) M Fucsovics
(Colombia) DE Galán	w/o
7	(Portugal) N Borges	6	1	2
2	(Italy) L Musetti	1	6	6

Semifinals
(Colombia) DE Galán	1	4
2	(Italy) L Musetti	6	6
