= 2023 Sardegna Open – Doubles =

Doubles
- 2023 Sardegna Open

Final
- Champions: (Austria) Alexander Erler (Austria) Lucas Miedler
- Runners-up: (Argentina) Máximo González (Argentina) Andrés Molteni
- Score: 7–6^{(8–6)}, 6–3

Events
Singles	Doubles
- Sardegna Open

Lorenzo Sonego and Andrea Vavassori were the defending champions but only Vavassori chose to defend his title, partnering Marcelo Demoliner. Vavassori lost in the quarterfinals to Máximo González and Andrés Molteni.

Alexander Erler and Lucas Miedler won the title after defeating González and Molteni 7–6^{(8–6)}, 6–3 in the final.

== Seeds ==
1. (Argentina) Máximo González / (Argentina) Andrés Molteni (final)
2. (United States) Nathaniel Lammons / (United States) Jackson Withrow (quarterfinals, withdrew)
3. (Austria) Alexander Erler / (Austria) Lucas Miedler (champions)
4. (United Kingdom) Julian Cash / (United Kingdom) Henry Patten (semifinals)

== Draw ==
Key

- Q = Qualifier
- WC = Wild card
- LL = Lucky loser
- Alt = Alternate
- ITF = ITF entry
- PR = Protected ranking
- SR = Special ranking
- SE = Special exempt
- JE = Junior exempt
- JR = Junior Accelerator Programme entrant
- CO = College Accelerator Programme entrant
- NG = Next Gen Accelerator Program entrant
- w/o = Walkover
- r = Retired
- d = Defaulted

First round
1	(Argentina) M González (Argentina) A Molteni	6	6
Alt	(Italy) S Caruso (Italy) S Travaglia	3	1
(Brazil) M Demoliner (Italy) A Vavassori	5
(France) J Chardy (France) U Humbert	4^{r}
4	(United Kingdom) J Cash (United Kingdom) H Patten	7^{7}	6
(Italy) F Cobolli (Italy) F Passaro	6^{4}	2
WC	(Italy) F Bondioli (Italy) G Zeppieri	7^{7}	6
(Ecuador) G Escobar (Ecuador) D Hidalgo	6^{4}	2
(Colombia) N Barrientos (Uruguay) A Behar	6^{4}	5
(Germany) C Frantzen (Germany) H Jebens	7^{7}	7
(Serbia) N Ćaćić (Kazakhstan) A Nedovyesov	6^{5}	4
3	(Austria) A Erler (Austria) L Miedler	7^{7}	6
WC	(Italy) A Giannessi (Italy) A Pellegrino	4	4
(Netherlands) S Arends (Greece) Pe Tsitsipas	6	6
(Sweden) A Göransson (Japan) B McLachlan	5	6^{2}
2	(United States) N Lammons (United States) J Withrow	7	7^{7}

Quarterfinals
1	(Argentina) M González (Argentina) A Molteni	6	5	[10]
(Brazil) M Demoliner (Italy) A Vavassori	2	7	[4]
4	(United Kingdom) J Cash (United Kingdom) H Patten	6	6
WC	(Italy) F Bondioli (Italy) G Zeppieri	1	1
(Germany) C Frantzen (Germany) H Jebens	6^{4}	7^{7}	[6]
3	(Austria) A Erler (Austria) L Miedler	7^{7}	6^{5}	[10]
(Netherlands) S Arends (Greece) Pe Tsitsipas	w/o
2	(United States) N Lammons (United States) J Withrow

Semifinals
1	(Argentina) M González (Argentina) A Molteni	6	6
4	(United Kingdom) J Cash (United Kingdom) H Patten	3	3
3	(Austria) A Erler (Austria) L Miedler	7^{7}	7^{7}
(Netherlands) S Arends (Greece) Pe Tsitsipas	6^{5}	6^{4}

Final
1	(Argentina) M González (Argentina) A Molteni	6^{6}	3
3	(Austria) A Erler (Austria) L Miedler	7^{8}	6
