= 2026 Sardegna Open – Doubles =

Doubles
- 2026 Sardegna Open

Final
- Champions: (Belgium) Sander Gillé (Netherlands) Sem Verbeek
- Runners-up: (Czech Republic) Petr Nouza (Austria) Neil Oberleitner
- Score: 4–6, 6–3, [10–4]

Events
Singles	Doubles
- Sardegna Open

Sriram Balaji and Andre Begemann were the defending champions but only Balaji chose to defend his title, partnering Marcelo Demoliner. They lost in the first round to Adam Pavlásek and Patrik Rikl.

Sander Gillé and Sem Verbeek won the title after defeating Petr Nouza and Neil Oberleitner 4–6, 6–3, [10–4] in the final.

== Seeds ==
1. (Czech Republic) Adam Pavlásek / (Czech Republic) Patrik Rikl (semifinals)
2. (Germany) Constantin Frantzen / (Netherlands) Robin Haase (quarterfinals)
3. (Czech Republic) Petr Nouza / (Austria) Neil Oberleitner (final)
4. (Brazil) Fernando Romboli / (Australia) John-Patrick Smith (first round)

== Draw ==
Key

- Q = Qualifier
- WC = Wild card
- LL = Lucky loser
- Alt = Alternate
- ITF = ITF entry
- PR = Protected ranking
- SR = Special ranking
- SE = Special exempt
- JE = Junior exempt
- JR = Junior Accelerator Programme entrant
- CO = College Accelerator Programme entrant
- NG = Next Gen Accelerator Program entrant
- w/o = Walkover
- r = Retired
- d = Defaulted

First round
1	(Czech Republic) A Pavlásek (Czech Republic) P Rikl	6	4	[10]
(India) S Balaji (Brazil) M Demoliner	1	6	[7]
WC	(Italy) F Cinà (Italy) S Travaglia	6	1	[7]
(New Zealand) F Reynolds (New Zealand) J Watt	3	6	[10]
4	(Brazil) F Romboli (Australia) J-P Smith	4	4
(Belgium) S Gillé (Netherlands) S Verbeek	6	6
(Canada) C Harper (United Kingdom) D Stevenson	3	6^{1}
(Argentina) RA Burruchaga (Italy) A Pellegrino	6	7^{7}
(Colombia) N Barrientos (Uruguay) A Behar	3	3
(United States) B Kittay (United States) R Seggerman	6	6
(Portugal) N Borges (Romania) V Cornea	6^{2}	2
3	(Czech Republic) P Nouza (Austria) N Oberleitner	7^{7}	6
(United States) M Kiger (United States) R Stalder	2	7^{7}	[10]
(Ecuador) G Escobar (Croatia) N Serdarušić	6	6^{2}	[8]
WC	(Italy) G Cadenasso (Italy) Lorenzo Carboni	3	4
2	(Germany) C Frantzen (Netherlands) R Haase	6	6

Quarterfinals
1	(Czech Republic) A Pavlásek (Czech Republic) P Rikl	6	6
(New Zealand) F Reynolds (New Zealand) J Watt	2	2
(Belgium) S Gillé (Netherlands) S Verbeek	6	6
(Argentina) RA Burruchaga (Italy) A Pellegrino	4	3
(United States) B Kittay (United States) R Seggerman	6^{0}	2
3	(Czech Republic) P Nouza (Austria) N Oberleitner	7^{7}	6
(United States) M Kiger (United States) R Stalder	6	4	[10]
2	(Germany) C Frantzen (Netherlands) R Haase	4	6	[6]

Semifinals
1	(Czech Republic) A Pavlásek (Czech Republic) P Rikl	6	3	[8]
(Belgium) S Gillé (Netherlands) S Verbeek	4	6	[10]
3	(Czech Republic) P Nouza (Austria) N Oberleitner	6	6^{4}	[12]
(United States) M Kiger (United States) R Stalder	4	7^{7}	[10]

Final
(Belgium) S Gillé (Netherlands) S Verbeek	4	6	[10]
3	(Czech Republic) P Nouza (Austria) N Oberleitner	6	3	[4]
