= 2020 Forte Village Sardegna Open – Doubles =

Doubles
- 2020 Forte Village Sardegna Open

Final
- Champions: (New Zealand) Marcus Daniell (Austria) Philipp Oswald
- Runners-up: (Colombia) Juan Sebastián Cabal (Colombia) Robert Farah
- Score: 6–3, 6–4

Events
Singles	Doubles
- Forte Village Sardegna Open

This was the first edition of the tournament.

Marcus Daniell and Philipp Oswald won the title, defeating Juan Sebastián Cabal and Robert Farah in the final, 6–3, 6–4.

== Seeds ==
1. (Colombia) Juan Sebastián Cabal / (Colombia) Robert Farah (final)
2. (Australia) John Peers / (New Zealand) Michael Venus (semifinals)
3. (New Zealand) Marcus Daniell / (Austria) Philipp Oswald (champions)
4. (Italy) Simone Bolelli / (Argentina) Máximo González (semifinals)

== Draw ==
Key

- Q = Qualifier
- WC = Wild card
- LL = Lucky loser
- Alt = Alternate
- ITF = ITF entry
- PR = Protected ranking
- SR = Special ranking
- SE = Special exempt
- JE = Junior exempt
- JR = Junior Accelerator Programme entrant
- CO = College Accelerator Programme entrant
- NG = Next Gen Accelerator Program entrant
- w/o = Walkover
- r = Retired
- d = Defaulted

=== Draw ===
First round
1	(Colombia) JS Cabal (Colombia) R Farah	6	7
(Netherlands) S Arends (Netherlands) D Pel	4	5
(Sweden) A Göransson (Czech Republic) J Veselý	6^{7}	6	[9]
(United States) T Paul (United States) F Tiafoe	7^{9}	1	[11]
4	(Italy) S Bolelli (Argentina) M González	6	6
(Uruguay) A Behar (Ecuador) G Escobar	1	4
(Italy) L Sonego (Italy) A Vavassori	6^{3}	7^{7}	[15]
(Italy) F Fognini (Italy) L Musetti	7^{7}	6^{5}	[13]
(New Zealand) A Sitak (Slovakia) I Zelenay	w/o
(Spain) P Andújar (Uruguay) P Cuevas
Alt	(Spain) A Ramos Viñolas (Spain) D Vega Hernández	2	1
3	(New Zealand) M Daniell (Austria) P Oswald	6	6
WC	(Kazakhstan) A Golubev (Kazakhstan) A Nedovyesov	6	5	[4]
(El Salvador) M Arévalo (United Kingdom) J O'Mara	4	7	[10]
WC	(Italy) M Cecchinato (Italy) A Seppi	3	4
2	(Australia) J Peers (New Zealand) M Venus	6	6

Quarterfinals
1	(Colombia) JS Cabal (Colombia) R Farah	w/o
(United States) T Paul (United States) F Tiafoe
4	(Italy) S Bolelli (Argentina) M González	6	6
(Italy) L Sonego (Italy) A Vavassori	2	4
(New Zealand) A Sitak (Slovakia) I Zelenay	3	6^{3}
3	(New Zealand) M Daniell (Austria) P Oswald	6	7^{7}
(El Salvador) M Arévalo (United Kingdom) J O'Mara	1	2
2	(Australia) J Peers (New Zealand) M Venus	6	6

Semifinals
1	(Colombia) JS Cabal (Colombia) R Farah	6	6
4	(Italy) S Bolelli (Argentina) M González	2	4
3	(New Zealand) M Daniell (Austria) P Oswald	6	6
2	(Australia) J Peers (New Zealand) M Venus	4	3

Final
1	(Colombia) JS Cabal (Colombia) R Farah	3	4
3	(New Zealand) M Daniell (Austria) P Oswald	6	6
