= 2024 Sardegna Open – Doubles =

Doubles
- 2024 Sardegna Open

Final
- Champions: (India) Sriram Balaji (Germany) Andre Begemann
- Runners-up: (Bolivia) Boris Arias (Bolivia) Federico Zeballos
- Score: 6–4, 6–7^{(3–7)}, [10–6]

Events
Singles	Doubles
- Sardegna Open

Alexander Erler and Lucas Miedler were the defending champions but lost in the semifinals to Sriram Balaji and Andre Begemann.

Balaji and Begemann won the title after defeating Boris Arias and Federico Zeballos 6–4, 6–7^{(3–7)}, [10–6] in the final.

== Seeds ==
1. (United Kingdom) Julian Cash / (United States) Robert Galloway (first round)
2. (Austria) Alexander Erler / (Austria) Lucas Miedler (semifinals)
3. (India) Yuki Bhambri / (Portugal) Francisco Cabral (quarterfinals)
4. (Germany) Constantin Frantzen / (Germany) Hendrik Jebens (semifinals)

== Draw ==
Key

- Q = Qualifier
- WC = Wild card
- LL = Lucky loser
- Alt = Alternate
- ITF = ITF entry
- PR = Protected ranking
- SR = Special ranking
- SE = Special exempt
- JE = Junior exempt
- JR = Junior Accelerator Programme entrant
- CO = College Accelerator Programme entrant
- NG = Next Gen Accelerator Program entrant
- w/o = Walkover
- r = Retired
- d = Defaulted

=== Draw ===
First round
1	(United Kingdom) J Cash (United States) R Galloway	6^{3}	5
(United States) E King (Brazil) O Luz	7^{7}	7
(Bolivia) H Dellien (Colombia) DE Galán	4	2
(Bolivia) B Arias (Bolivia) F Zeballos	6	6
4	(Germany) C Frantzen (Germany) H Jebens	7	6
(Serbia) N Ćaćić (Netherlands) B Stevens	5	2
(Czech Republic) P Nouza (Mexico) MÁ Reyes-Varela	3	6	[10]
WC	(Italy) F Maestrelli (Italy) F Passaro	6	4	[5]
(Italy) L Darderi (Argentina) TA Tirante	6	3	[4]
PR	(India) S Balaji (Germany) A Begemann	4	6	[10]
WC	(Italy) Niccolò Dessì (Italy) Alberto Sanna	5	0
3	(India) Y Bhambri (Portugal) F Cabral	7	6
(Moldova) R Albot (Italy) A Pellegrino	6	5	[10]
(Argentina) F Coria (Argentina) C Ugo Carabelli	4	7	[6]
(Austria) P Oswald (Brazil) F Romboli	2	4
2	(Austria) A Erler (Austria) L Miedler	6	6

Quarterfinals
(United States) E King (Brazil) O Luz	5	3
(Bolivia) B Arias (Bolivia) F Zeballos	7	6
4	(Germany) C Frantzen (Germany) H Jebens	6	3	[10]
(Czech Republic) P Nouza (Mexico) MÁ Reyes-Varela	2	6	[8]
PR	(India) S Balaji (Germany) A Begemann	7^{7}	7^{7}
3	(India) Y Bhambri (Portugal) F Cabral	6^{5}	6^{4}
(Moldova) R Albot (Italy) A Pellegrino	5	6	[9]
2	(Austria) A Erler (Austria) L Miedler	7	4	[11]

Semifinals
(Bolivia) B Arias (Bolivia) F Zeballos	7	7^{7}
4	(Germany) C Frantzen (Germany) H Jebens	5	6^{5}
PR	(India) S Balaji (Germany) A Begemann	6	6
2	(Austria) A Erler (Austria) L Miedler	1	4

Final
(Bolivia) B Arias (Bolivia) F Zeballos	4	7^{7}	[6]
PR	(India) S Balaji (Germany) A Begemann	6	6^{3}	[10]
