= 2021 Sardegna Open =

- Date: 5–11 April 2021
- Edition: 2nd
- Category: ATP Tour 250
- Draw: 28S / 16D
- Surface: Clay
- Location: Cagliari, Italy
- Venue: Cagliari Tennis Club

Champions

Singles
- (Italy) Lorenzo Sonego

Doubles
- (Italy) Lorenzo Sonego / (Italy) Andrea Vavassori
← 2020 ·	Sardegna Open	· 2023 →

The 2021 Sardegna Open was a tennis tournament on the 2021 ATP Tour. It was played on outdoor clay courts in Cagliari, Sardinia, Italy. It was organised with a single-year licence in 2021, and was held at Tennis Club Cagliari from April 5 to 11, 2021.

The ATP 250 tournament debuted October 2020 as a response to the COVID-19 pandemic to increase earning opportunities for players. It returned to Sardegna in 2021 and opened the red-clay season in Europe.

== Champions ==
=== Singles ===
- (Italy) Lorenzo Sonego def. (Serbia) Laslo Đere, 2–6, 7–6^{(7–5)}, 6–4

=== Doubles ===
- (Italy) Lorenzo Sonego / (Italy) Andrea Vavassori def. (Italy) Simone Bolelli / (Argentina) Andrés Molteni, 6–3, 6–4

== Points and prize money ==
=== Point distribution ===
Event	W	F	SF	QF	Round of 16	Round of 32	Q	Q2	Q1
Singles	250	150	90	45	20	0	12	6	0
Doubles	250	150	90	45	0	—	—	—	—

=== Prize money ===
Event	W	F	SF	QF	Round of 16	Round of 32	Q2	Q1
Singles	€40,100	€28,750	€20,465	€13,650	€8,770	€5,275	€2,580	€1,340
Doubles*	€14,970	€10,730	€7,060	€4,590	€2,690	—	—	—

_{*per team}

== Singles main-draw entrants ==
=== Seeds ===
Country	Player	Rank^{1}	Seed
GBR	Dan Evans	29	1
USA	Taylor Fritz	32	2
ITA	Lorenzo Sonego	34	3
GEO	Nikoloz Basilashvili	38	4
GER	Jan-Lennard Struff	42	5
AUS	John Millman	43	6
ARG	Guido Pella	48	7
USA	Tommy Paul	53	8

- ^{1} Rankings are as of March 22, 2021

=== Other entrants ===
The following players received wildcards into the main draw:

- (Italy) Federico Gaio
- (Italy) Thomas Fabbiano
- (Italy) Giulio Zeppieri

The following players received entry from the qualifying draw:

- (United Kingdom) Liam Broady
- (Switzerland) Marc-Andrea Hüsler
- (Slovakia) Jozef Kovalík
- (India) Sumit Nagal

=== Withdrawals ===
Before the tournament

- (France) Jérémy Chardy → replaced by (Portugal) João Sousa
- (Chile) Cristian Garín → replaced by (Argentina) Federico Coria
- (Russia) Aslan Karatsev → replaced by (Italy) Lorenzo Musetti
- (Brazil) Thiago Monteiro → replaced by (Slovakia) Andrej Martin
- (Spain) Fernando Verdasco → replaced by (Germany) Yannick Hanfmann

== Doubles main-draw entrants ==
=== Seeds ===
Country	Player	Country	Player	Rank^{1}	Seed
BRA	Marcelo Melo	NED	Jean-Julien Rojer	43	1
ITA	Simone Bolelli	ARG	Andrés Molteni	133	2
AUS	Matthew Ebden	IND	Divij Sharan	138	3
GBR	Lloyd Glasspool	GBR	Jonny O'Mara	165	4

- Rankings are as of March 22, 2021.

=== Other entrants ===
The following pairs received wildcards into the doubles main draw:

- (Italy) Jacopo Berrettini / (Italy) Matteo Berrettini
- (Italy) Andrea Pellegrino / (Italy) Giulio Zeppieri

The following pair received entry using a protected ranking:

- (Czech Republic) Roman Jebavý / (Slovakia) Igor Zelenay

=== Withdrawals ===
Before the tournament

- (United States) Rajeev Ram / (United Kingdom) Joe Salisbury → replaced by (Finland) Harri Heliövaara / (Ukraine) Denys Molchanov
- (United Kingdom) Jonny O'Mara / (United Kingdom) Ken Skupski → replaced by (United Kingdom) Lloyd Glasspool / (United Kingdom) Jonny O'Mara

During the tournament

- (United Kingdom) Dan Evans / (Argentina) Federico Coria
