= 2023 Sardegna Open =

- Date: 2–7 May
- Edition: 3rd
- Surface: Clay
- Location: Cagliari, Italy

Champions

Singles
- (France) Ugo Humbert

Doubles
- (Austria) Alexander Erler / (Austria) Lucas Miedler
- Sardegna Open

The 2023 Sardegna Open was a professional tennis tournament played on clay courts. It was the third edition of the tournament which was part of the 2023 ATP Challenger Tour. It took place in Cagliari, Italy between 2 and 7 May 2023.

== Singles main-draw entrants ==
=== Seeds ===
Country	Player	Rank^{1}	Seed
JPN	Yoshihito Nishioka	34	1
USA	Ben Shelton	38	2
USA	Mackenzie McDonald	54	3
SRB	Laslo Djere	70	4
ARG	Diego Schwartzman	72	5
FRA	Ugo Humbert	77	6
~~ITA~~	~~Marco Cecchinato~~	~~85~~	~~7~~
BRA	Thiago Monteiro	97	8

- ^{1} Rankings as of 24 April 2023.

=== Other entrants ===
The following players received wildcards into the singles main draw:

- (Italy) Flavio Cobolli
- (Italy) Francesco Maestrelli
- (Italy) Andrea Vavassori

The following players received entry into the singles main draw as alternates:

- (Italy) Mattia Bellucci
- (Slovakia) Jozef Kovalík
- (Hungary) Fábián Marozsán
- (Italy) Luca Nardi

The following players received entry from the qualifying draw:

- (Canada) Steven Diez
- (Italy) Alessandro Giannessi
- (Italy) Gianluca Mager
- (Italy) Stefano Travaglia

The following player received entry as a lucky loser:

- (Italy) Andrea Pellegrino

== Champions ==
=== Singles ===
- (France) Ugo Humbert def. (Serbia) Laslo Djere 4–6, 7–5, 6–4.

=== Doubles ===
- (Austria) Alexander Erler / (Austria) Lucas Miedler def. (Argentina) Máximo González / (Argentina) Andrés Molteni 7–6^{(8–6)}, 6–3.
