= Laslo Djere =

Serbian tennis player (born 1995)

- Djere at the 2026 Wimbledon Championships
- Full name: Laslo Djere
- Native name: Ласло Ђере
- Country (sports): Serbia
- Residence: Senta, Serbia
- Born: 2 June 1995 (age 31) Senta, Serbia, FR Yugoslavia
- Height: 1.88 m (6 ft 2 in)
- Turned pro: 2013
- Plays: Right-handed (two handed-backhand)
- Coach: Mario Tudor (2025–)
- Prize money: US $6,862,096

Singles
- Career record: 156–168
- Career titles: 3
- Highest ranking: No. 27 (10 June 2019)
- Current ranking: No. 206 (31 August 2026)

Grand Slam singles results
- Australian Open: 2R (2023)
- French Open: 3R (2019, 2021)
- Wimbledon: 3R (2023)
- US Open: 3R (2023)

Doubles
- Career record: 3–27
- Career titles: 0
- Highest ranking: No. 346 (22 March 2021)

Grand Slam doubles results
- Australian Open: 2R (2021)
- Wimbledon: 1R (2019, 2021, 2022, 2023, 2025)
- US Open: 2R (2023)

Team competitions
- Davis Cup: SF (2017)
- Last updated on: 1 September 2026.

Laslo Djere (Note: Serbian Cyrillic: Ласло Ђере; Serbian Latin: Laslo Đere; Hungarian: Györe László) (born 2 June 1995) is a Serbian professional tennis player. On 10 June 2019, Djere reached his career-high singles ranking of world No. 27. On 22 March 2021, he reached his career-high at world No. 346 in the doubles rankings. He is currently the No. 5 Serbian player.

He has won three ATP Tour singles titles, all on clay, one an ATP 500 event in Rio in 2019, after which he made the break-through into top 30, and at the inaugural 2020 Forte Village Sardegna Open and the 2025 Chile Open both ATP 250 events. Djere debuted on the ATP Tour at the 2013 PTT Thailand Open, where he was a wildcard. His first qualification attempt to play in the main draw at any Grand Slam was at the 2015 French Open, but his first successful attempt and main draw debut happened at the 2016 French Open. At 2018 US Open, he recorded his first Grand Slam win, defeating Leonardo Mayer in the first round.

== Early life and background ==
Laslo Djere was born on 2 June 1995 to mother Hajnalka and father Csaba (or Čaba) Đere in Senta, then part of the Federal Republic of Yugoslavia. His parents were Hungarians. Both of his parents died from cancer. He is a member of the Hungarian community in Serbia. Djere began playing tennis at age 5 with his father. He also has one sister named Judit. He is fluent in Serbian, English, and Hungarian. His favorite surface is clay. His idols growing up were Andy Roddick, Lleyton Hewitt and Novak Djokovic. He is a supporter of the Chicago Bulls (NBA) and Seattle Seahawks (NFL).

== Junior career ==
On the junior tour, Djere won five singles titles in 10 finals (one final was canceled), while in doubles he won two titles in as many finals. In December 2012, he reached the finals in back-to-back tournaments at Eddie Herr and Orange Bowl, losing the first one (Grade 1 event) 6–0, 4–6, 5–7 to Cristian Garín despite leading 6–0, 4–1, but winning the latter more prestigious event (Grade A) over Elias Ymer 6–4, 6–4. This came after the recent passing of his mother Hajnalka. In May 2013, he played in the final of another Grade A event, Trofeo Bonfiglio, but lost to Alexander Zverev 6–7(5), 7–5, 5–7. Nevertheless, he reached a career-high combined ranking of No. 3 on 27 May 2013.

Junior Grand Slam results – Singles:

- Australian Open: 1R (2013)
- French Open: 3R (2013)
- Wimbledon: QF (2013)
- US Open: –

Junior Grand Slam results – Doubles:

- Australian Open: 2R (2013)
- French Open: 2R (2012, 2013)
- Wimbledon: 2R (2013)
- US Open: –

== Professional career ==
=== 2013–2016: ATP debut, top 200 ===
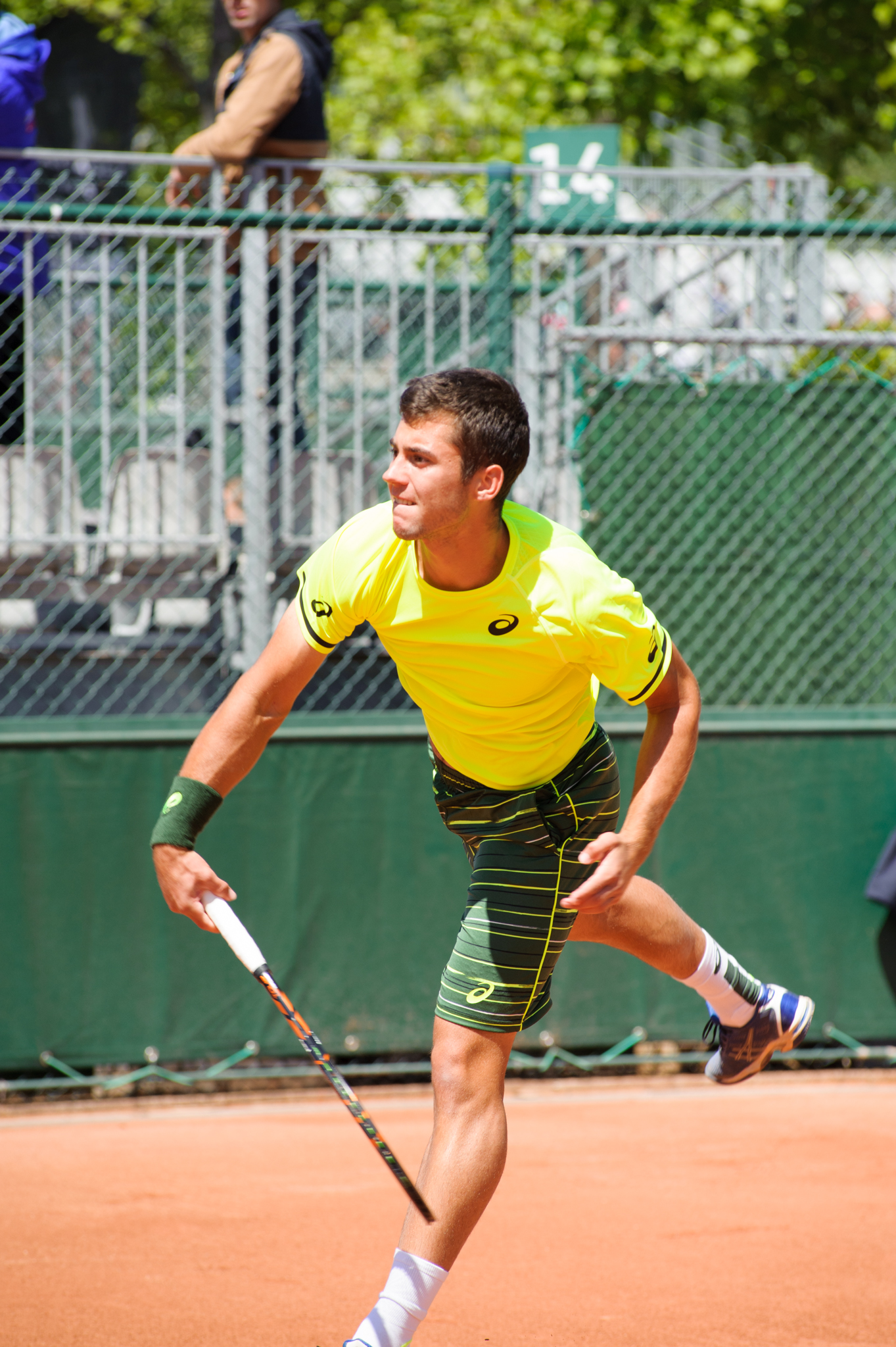
Djere at the 2015 French Open qualification

Djere started the 2013 season, playing mainly at Futures. In July 2013, he won the Serbia F6 Futures in Kikinda, defeating Teodor-Dacian Crăciun in the final. A month later, he won another Futures at Serbia F7 in Zlatibor. In September 2013, he made his ATP main draw debut at the 2013 PTT Thailand Open, where he received entry to the main draw as a wildcard entrant. In the first round, he lost to the sixth seed Feliciano López. By the end of the year, he was runner–up at two Futures in Cyprus.

In 2014, Djere played only Futures, as well as two unsuccessful Challenger attempts. At Prosperita Open in Ostrava, he lost in the third round of qualification, losing to Marek Michalička. In May, he won the Croatia F8 Futures in Bol, defeating Mike Urbanija in the final. A week later, he won another Futures in Bosnia&Herzegovina (F2) in Prijedor. At Vicenza International, he lost in the third round of qualification, losing to Zhang Ze. In September, he won the Serbia F13 Futures in Niš. His last tournament of the 2014 season was in December, at the Senegal F2 Futures in Dakar, where he won the title, defeating Aldin Šetkić in the final.

Djere started 2015 season successfully, playing in the semifinal of Morocco Tennis Tour – Casablanca, where Javier Martí stopped him to reach his first Challenger final. In late January, he won Egypt F3 Futures in Cairo, defeating Kamil Majchrzak in straight-sets. At Dubai Tennis Championships, he made his first attempt to play at some ATP 500 Series event, but failed in the second round of qualification, losing from Lucas Pouille. At French Open, he played in qualification, trying to reach his first main-draw at any grand-slams, but lost in the first round from Nikoloz Basilashvili. In June 2015, in the final of Czech Open challenger tournament in Prostějov, he lost to No. 2 seed Jiří Veselý (ranked No. 41 at the time), while beating three other top 80 players on his way to the final, No. 1 seed Martin Kližan, No. 6 seed Dušan Lajović, and No. 7 seed João Souza, respectively. After that result, on June 8, he debuted in top 200, reaching place of 182. He also reached the quarterfinal at Aspria Tennis Cup in Milan. At US Open, he failed to reach the main-draw, losing in first round of qualification from Mathias Bourgue. By the end of the year, he played quarterfinal at Morocco Tennis Tour – Casablanca II, and semifinal at Sparkassen ATP Challenger in Ortisei.

In May 2016, he played in a Grand Slam main draw for the first time after getting through the qualifying draw at the French Open. He reached two Challenger finals during the summer of 2016.

=== 2017–2018: Breakthrough, top 100 ===
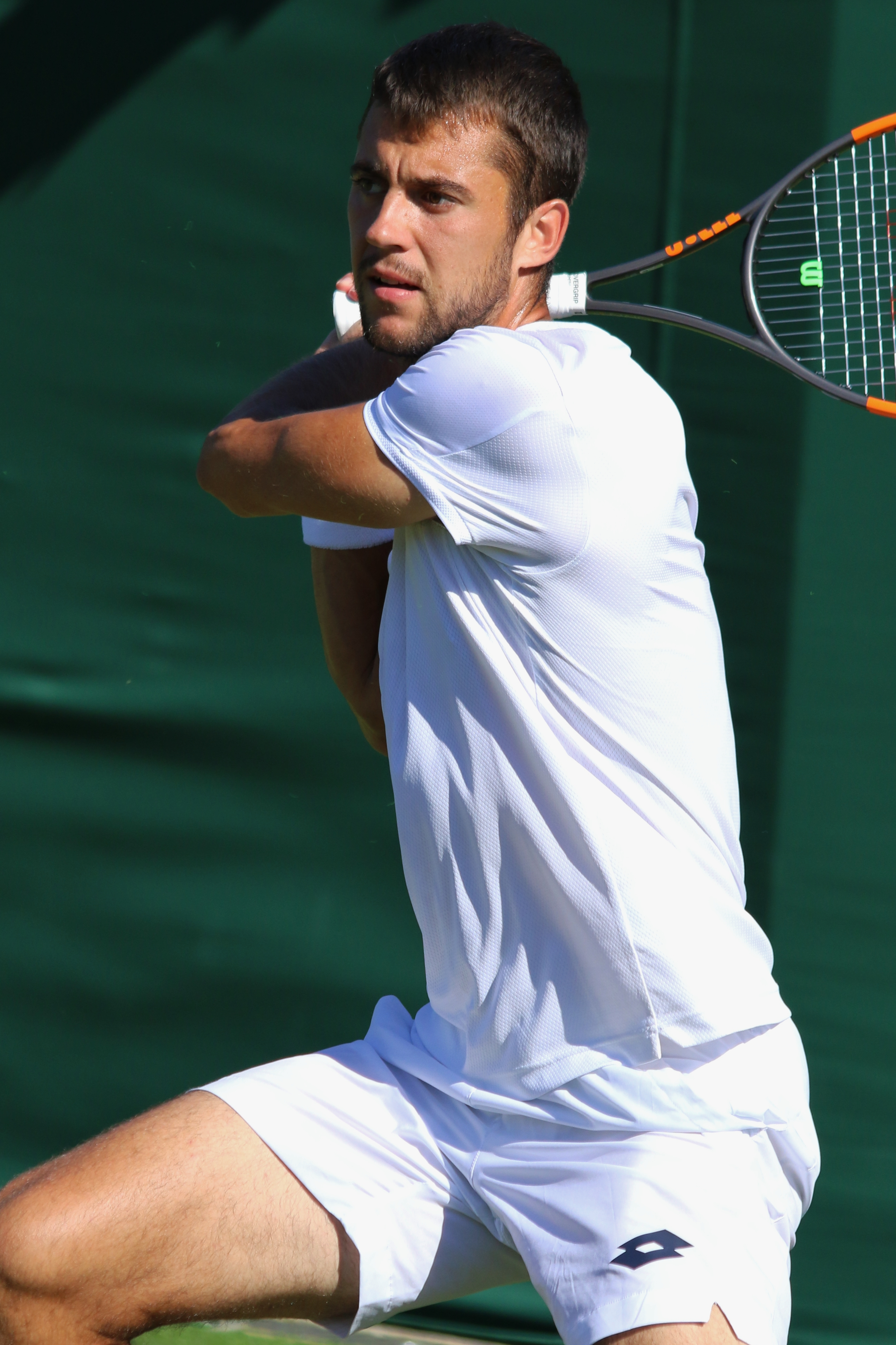
Djere at the 2018 Wimbledon Championships

In January, Djere played at Australian Open qualification, but lost in second round to Ivan Dodig, missing his chance to debut in main-draw there. Later, he won title at Croatia F4 Futures in Opatija, defeating Zdeněk Kolář in final. In April 2017, Djere recorded his first ATP main draw win at the Grand Prix Hassan II over Martin Kližan, before losing to second seed Albert Ramos Viñolas. At his next tournament, the Hungarian Open, he reached his first ATP semifinal after defeating the likes of Daniil Medvedev, Viktor Troicki and Fernando Verdasco, before being defeated by Aljaž Bedene. He followed this with a quarterfinal at Istanbul Open, where he was defeated by Troicki. At French Open, he lost in second round of qualification from Oscar Otte. Following the successes on the ATP level, he played in challengers during the summer, winning one (2017 Internazionali di Perugia) and reaching three other finals, which enabled him to break the top 100 for the first time on 24 July 2017 at No. 91. In September, Djere made his Davis Cup debut for Serbia in their 2017 semifinal clash against France, losing in straight sets to Jo-Wilfried Tsonga. In November, he played his first ATP Masters 1000 qualification, but wasn't good enough to beat Filip Krajinović in the second round, and qualify to main-draw. He finished the year ranked No. 88.

In January, Djere finally debuted in main-draw at Australian Open, playing in first round against Ivo Karlović, but didn't make it to the second round. He had his ATP Masters 1000 debut at the 2018 BNP Paribas Open, where he was defeated by Tim Smyczek. He reached two ATP semifinals in 2018, Istanbul Open in May and Swiss Open Gstaad in July, where he defeated Borna Ćorić among others. He recorded his first Grand Slam main draw win by defeating Leonardo Mayer at the US Open, before losing to Richard Gasquet in the second round when he failed to convert all 12 of his break point opportunities. He next played a home tie against India in the Davis Cup World Group play-offs, where he defeated Ramkumar Ramanathan in the opener for his first career win in a Davis Cup match and Serbia eventually won the tie 4–0. On 24 September 2018, after making semifinal at Sibiu Open, Djere reached a then-career high of world No. 83 on 24 September 2018, that in the same time was his highest ranking until 2019.

=== 2019: First ATP title, Major third round, top 30 ===
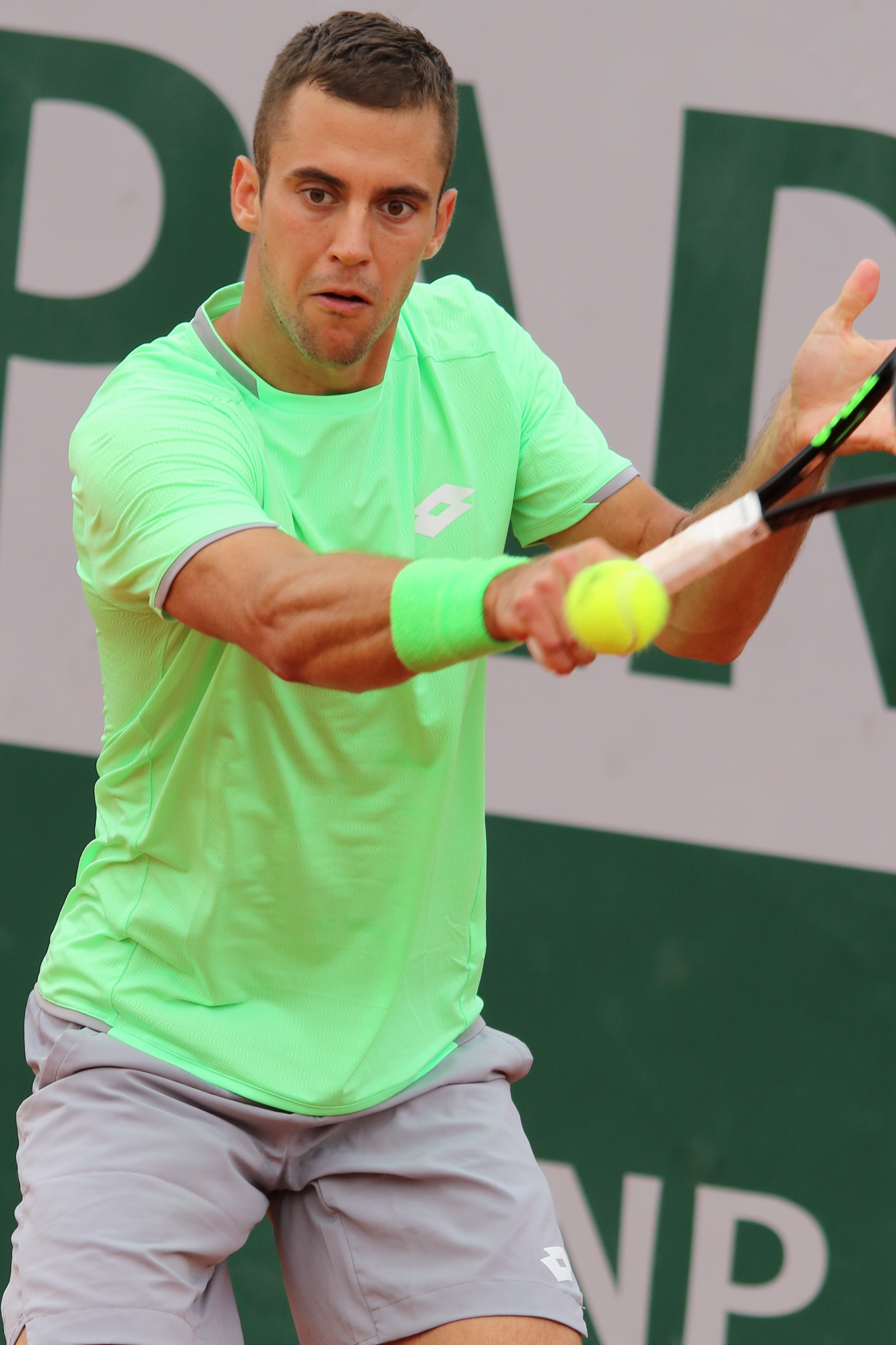
Djere at the 2019 French Open

In February, Djere won his first ATP title at the Rio Open, defeating Dominic Thiem in the process for the first top 10 win of his career and reached a then-career high ranking of No. 37. During the trophy presentation in Rio, Djere dedicated the title to his late parents in an emotional speech. This title, helped him enter the top 50 for the first time, climbing to World No. 37. After that he made the semifinal at 2019 Brasil Open in São Paulo, losing from Guido Pella.

He next played in Indian Wells, where he was seeded for the first time in his career in an ATP event (despite being a wildcard entrant), receiving a first round bye and then defeating Guido Andreozzi for his first Masters 1000 win, before being defeated by countryman Miomir Kecmanović in the third round, his best career showing at a Masters 1000 level. A semifinal at the Hungarian Open saw him climb to a career high of world No. 29. He next reached the third round of Madrid Masters, where he defeated Juan Martín del Potro for his second top 10 win, before losing to Marin Čilić. Winning only one match at the Rome Masters (lost in round two to Basilashvili), coupled with a few withdrawals proved to be enough for Djere to be seeded at a Grand Slam for the first time in his career.

At the French Open, he was seeded 31st, and had his best Grand Slam result so far. He reached the third round, winning against Albert Ramos Viñolas and Alexei Popyrin, in first two-round, before he lost from Kei Nishikori in third round.

=== 2020: Second ATP tour title ===
In October, Djere won the inaugural Forte Village Sardegna Open by beating home favorite Marco Cecchinato in straight sets in the finals.

=== 2021: Second French Open third round ===
In April, he reached the final of Sardegna Open where he lost in three tight sets against home favorite Lorenzo Sonego.

Djere reached the third round of a Grand Slam for a second time at the 2021 French Open where he was defeated by sixth seed Alexander Zverev.

=== 2022: Fourth ATP final in Winston-Salem ===
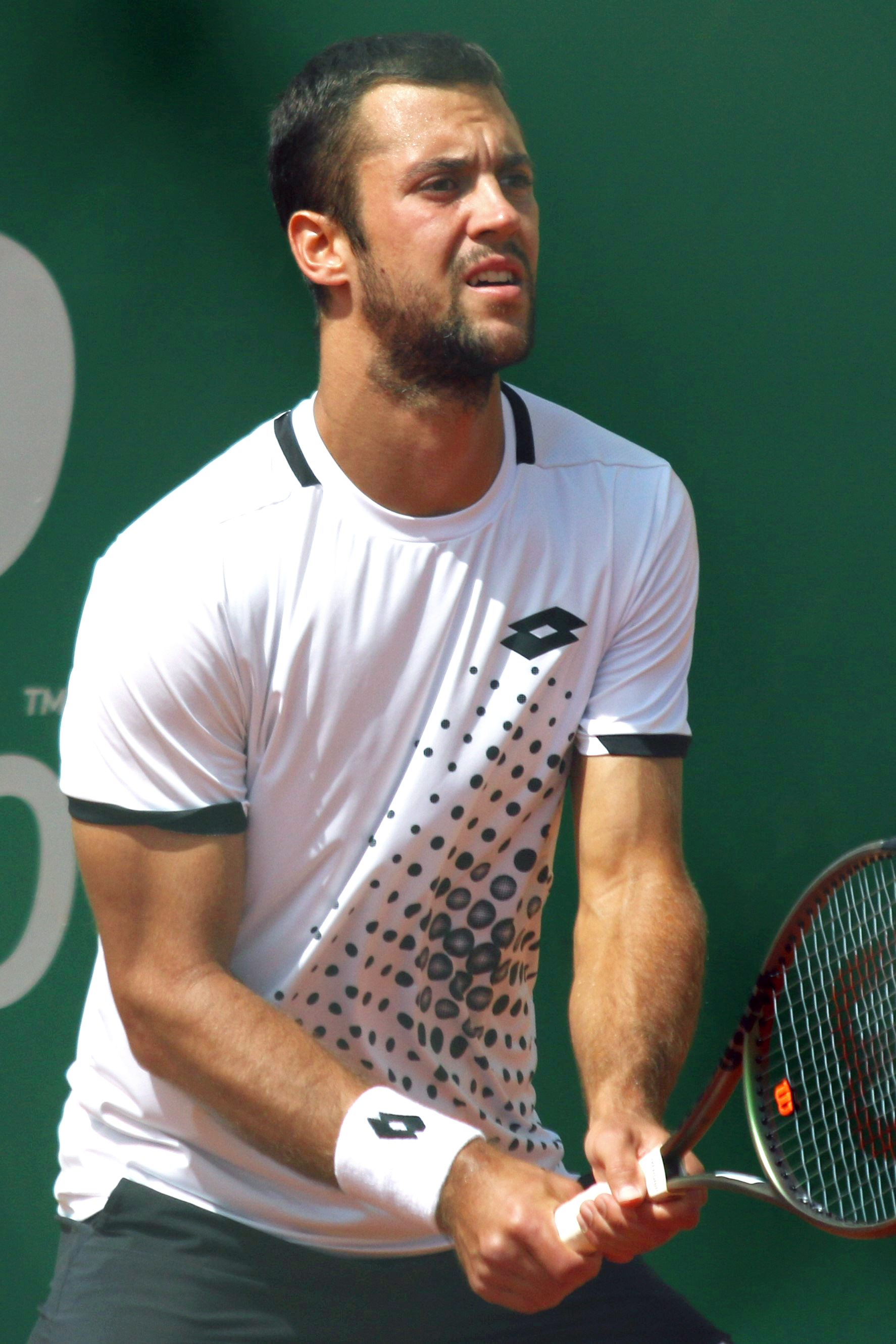
Djere at the 2022 Monte-Carlo Masters

Djere started his 2022 season at the Adelaide International 1. Seeded seventh, he reached the quarterfinals where he lost to third seed Marin Čilić. At the Australian Open, he was defeated in the first round by world No. 14 and eventual quarterfinalist, Denis Shapovalov.

Seeded eighth at the Argentina Open, Djere lost in the first round to compatriot, Miomir Kecmanović, in three sets. At the Rio Open, he was defeated in the first round by sixth seed and world No. 21, Lorenzo Sonego. In Acapulco, he was ousted from the tournament in the first round by third seed, world No. 4, and last year finalist, Stefanos Tsitsipas, despite having three set points in the first set. In March, he competed at the BNP Paribas Open. Here, he lost in the second round to 10th seed Jannik Sinner.

At the 2022 Monte-Carlo Masters he reached the third round for the first time at this Masters and only the third time in his career at this level. He defeated Maxime Cressy, 16th seed Lorenzo Sonego in straight sets before losing to third seed and eventual champion Stefanos Tsitsipas.

At the 2022 Winston-Salem Open he reached his fourth ATP tour final defeating David Goffin, 16th seed João Sousa, qualifier Jason Kubler, Richard Gasquet and qualifier Marc-Andrea Huesler after needing 9 match points to win.

=== 2023: First Top-5 win, Masters fourth round, ATP 500 final ===
Djere started his season at the Maharashtra Open. He defeated fifth seed, Alex Molčan, in the first round. He lost in the second round to qualifier Maximilian Marterer. At the ASB Classic, he stunned top seed and world No. 3, Casper Ruud, in the second round for his third Top-10 win of his career, and his first Top-5 victory. He was defeated in the quarterfinals by Constant Lestienne, despite having a match point in the second set. At the Australian Open, he got his first win at this Major event by beating qualifier Zizou Bergs in the first round. He lost in the second round to 27th seed and world No. 28 Grigor Dimitrov.

After the Australian Open, Djere represented Serbia in the Davis Cup tie against Norway. He played one match and won over Viktor Durasovic. In the end, Serbia won the tie over Norway 4–0 to advance to the Davis Cup Finals. At the Argentina Open, he lost in the second round to top seed, world No. 2, and eventual champion, Carlos Alcaraz, in three sets. In Rio, he was defeated in the second round by compatriot Dušan Lajović. Seeded sixth at the Chile Open, he reached the quarterfinals where he lost to third seed and previous year finalist, Sebastián Báez. In March, he competed at the BNP Paribas Open. He was beaten in the first round by Oscar Otte. In Miami, he lost in the second round to 10th seed, world No. 11, 2021 finalist, and eventual finalist, Jannik Sinner.

Djere started his clay court season at the Monte-Carlo Masters. He lost in the first round to 10th seed and world No. 13, Hubert Hurkacz, in a three-set thriller, despite having match point in the third set. At the first edition of the Srpska Open, he beat third seed and world No. 21, Borna Ćorić, in the second round. He fell in his quarterfinal match to Alex Molčan. In Madrid, he lost in the first round to qualifier and eventual semifinalist, Aslan Karatsev. Seeded fourth at the Sardegna Open, he made it to his 12th ATP Challenger tour final and first since July 2018 defeating Ben Shelton but lost to sixth seed Ugo Humbert. At the Italian Open, he defeated 23rd seed and world No. 30, Botic van de Zandschulp, in the second round. He reached the fourth round for the first in his career at a Masters 1000 level, benefitting from two retirements in the first and third rounds from Constant Lestienne and Cristian Garín respectively, but lost to world No. 4 Casper Ruud. At the 2023 Wimbledon Championships he reached the third round for the first time at this Major, defeating two Americans Maxime Cressy in four sets with four tiebreaks and 32nd seed Ben Shelton also in four sets. In July, Djere reached the final of Hamburg Open, where he was defeated by Alexander Zverev. In August, Djere reached the semifinals in Kitzbühel, where he was defeated in three sets after exactly three and a half hours of play by Dominic Thiem, despite having 5 match points.

During the US Open hardcourt swing, he reached quarterfinals of Winston-Salem Open by defeating Facundo Díaz Acosta in the second and Alex Michelsen in the third round, both in straight sets, before losing in the quarterfinals to the sixth seed and eventual champion Sebastián Báez. At the US Open, as No. 32 seed Djere reached the third round. In the first round he defeated Brandon Nakashima, while in the second, he defeated Frenchman Hugo Gaston, both times in straight sets. In the round of 32, he lost to Novak Djokovic in five sets, after being two sets to love up. In September, during the Davis Cup Finals in Valencia, Djere, playing singles as his country's No. 1 for the first time, won against Kwon Soon-woo from South Korea and gave the all-important second point to his Serbian Davis Cup team. In the tie against Spain, Djere won in straight sets against Albert Ramos Viñolas, helping Serbia win the tie 3:0.

In October 2023, Djere reached the semifinals of Stockholm Open, by defeating Leo Borg in the first, J. J. Wolf in the second round and outlasting Tomáš Macháč in the quarterfinals. In the semifinals, he lost to an eventual champion, Gael Monfils.

=== 2024–2025: Santiago title, 150th win ===
In November 2024, Djere reached the semifinals at his home tournament, the 2024 Belgrade Open in Serbia, but lost to compatriot Hamad Medjedovic.

In February 2025, Djere reached back-to back-semifinals during the Golden Swing at the 2025 Argentina Open and at the 2025 Chile Open defeating en route, fourth seed Alejandro Tabilo, Thiago Seyboth Wild as a qualifier, and fourth seed Pedro Martínez, Jaime Faria, respectively. He went one step further reaching his sixth tour-level final in Santiago with a win over top seed Francisco Cerúndolo and subsequently won the title defeating another Argentinian, the defending champion Sebastián Báez, his 150th career win. As a result he returned to the top 75 in the ATP singles rankings on 3 March 2025.

== Coaches ==
Djere's history of coaches include: Petar Čonkić in 2018, Boris Čonkić from 2018 to 2020, Eduardo Infantino from 2020 to 2022, Jaroslav Levinský from 2023 to 2024, and Mario Tudor since 2025.

== Performance timelines ==
Key
W	F	SF	QF	#R	RR	Q#	P#	DNQ	A	Z#	PO	G	S	B	NMS	NTI	P	NH

(W) winner; (F) finalist; (SF) semifinalist; (QF) quarterfinalist; (#R) rounds 4, 3, 2, 1; (RR) round-robin stage; (Q#) qualification round; (P#) preliminary round; (DNQ) did not qualify; (A) absent; (Z#) Davis/Fed Cup Zonal Group (with number indication) or (PO) play-off; (G) gold, (S) silver or (B) bronze Olympic/Paralympic medal; (NMS) not a Masters tournament; (NTI) not a Tier I tournament; (P) postponed; (NH) not held; (SR) strike rate (events won / competed); (W–L) win–loss record.
To avoid confusion and double counting, these charts are updated at the conclusion of a tournament or when the player's participation has ended.

=== Singles ===
Current through the 2026 Wimbledon Championships.

Tournament	2013	2014	2015	2016	2017	2018	2019	2020	2021	2022	2023	2024	2025	2026	SR	W–L	Win%
Grand Slam tournaments
Australian Open	A	A	A	Q1	Q2	1R	1R	1R	1R	1R	2R	1R	Q2	1R	0 / 8	1–8	11%
French Open	A	A	Q1	1R	Q2	1R	3R	1R	3R	2R	1R	1R	1R	A	0 / 9	5–9	36%
Wimbledon	A	A	A	A	Q1	1R	2R	NH	2R	1R	3R	1R	1R	A	0 / 7	4–7	36%
US Open	A	A	Q1	Q2	A	2R	1R	1R	1R	1R	3R	2R	A		0 / 7	4–7	36%
Win–loss	0–0	0–0	0–0	0–1	0–0	1–4	3–4	0–3	3–4	1–4	5–4	1–4	0–2	0–1	0 / 31	14–31	31%
National representation
Davis Cup	A	A	A	A	SF	1R	A	A (Note: Edition is split into the two years due to COVID-19.)		GS	SF	G1	A	A	0 / 5	5–5	50%
Summer Olympics	NH			A	NH				A	NH		A	NH		0 / 0	0–0	–
ATP 1000
Indian Wells Open	A	A	A	A	A	1R	3R	NH	1R	2R	1R	A	A	A	0 / 5	2–5	29%
Miami Open	A	A	A	A	A	A	A	NH	2R	1R	2R	2R	A	A	0 / 4	3–4	43%
Monte-Carlo Masters	A	A	A	A	A	A	1R	NH	1R	3R	1R	1R	Q2	A	0 / 5	2–5	29%
Madrid Open	A	A	A	A	A	A	3R	NH	Q1	A	1R	A	2R	A	0 / 2	2–2	50%
Italian Open	A	A	A	A	A	A	2R	A	1R	2R	4R	A	3R	A	0 / 4	5–4	56%
Canadian Open	A	A	A	A	A	A	1R	NH	A	A	A	A	A		0 / 1	0–1	0%
Cincinnati Open	A	A	A	A	A	A	1R	Q1	1R	A	Q1	A	A		0 / 2	0–2	0%
Shanghai Masters	A	A	A	A	A	A	A	NH			1R	A	1R		0 / 2	0–2	0%
Paris Masters	A	A	A	A	Q2	A	1R	1R	1R	Q2	2R	A	A		0 / 4	1–4	20%
Win–loss	0–0	0–0	0–0	0–0	0–0	0–1	4–4	0–1	1–6	4–4	5–7	1–2	3–2	0–0	0 / 28	15–28	35%
Career statistics
	2013	2014	2015	2016	2017	2018	2019	2020	2021	2022	2023	2024	2025	2026	Career		
Tournaments	1	0	1	1	4	16	23	10	26	24	24	16	15	4	Career total: 165		
Titles	0	0	0	0	0	0	1	1	0	0	0	0	1	0	Career total: 3		
Finals	0	0	0	0	0	0	1	1	1	1	1	0	1	0	Career total: 6		
Hard Win–loss	0–1	0–0	0–0	0–0	1–1	2–9	2–10	2–5	5–13	10–12	16–12	6–7	0–3	0–2	0 / 75	44–75	37%
Clay Win–loss	0–0	0–0	0–1	0–1	6–4	10–7	17–9	11–4	17–11	10–10	16–11	4–8	12–6	1–2	3 / 75	104–74	58%
Grass Win–loss	0–0	0–0	0–0	0–0	0–0	0–1	1–3	0–0	1–2	1–3	4–3	0–2	1–4	0–0	0 / 18	8–18	31%
Overall win–loss	0–1	0–0	0–1	0–1	7–5	12–17	20–22	13–9	23–26	21–25	36–26	10–17	13–13	1–4	3 / 168	156–167	48%
Win (%)	0%	–	0%	0%	58%	41%	48%	59%	47%	46%	58%	37%	50%	20%	Career total: 48%		
Year-end ranking	495	341	186	185	88	93	38	57	52	70	33	115	98		$6,803,951		

== ATP career finals ==
=== Singles: 6 (3 titles, 3 runner-ups) ===
Legend Grand Slam (0–0) ATP Finals (0–0) ATP 1000 (0–0) ATP 500 (1–1) ATP 250 (2–2)	Titles by surface Hard (0–1) Clay (3–2) Grass (0–0)	Titles by setting Outdoor (3–3) Indoor (0–0)

Result	W–L	Date	Tournament	Tier	Surface	Opponent	Score
Win	1–0	Feb 2019	Rio Open, Brazil	ATP 500	Clay	(Canada) Félix Auger-Aliassime	6–3, 7–5
Win	2–0	Oct 2020	Sardegna Open, Italy	ATP 250	Clay	(Italy) Marco Cecchinato	7–6^{(7–3)}, 7–5
Loss	2–1	Apr 2021	Sardegna Open, Italy	ATP 250	Clay	(Italy) Lorenzo Sonego	6–2, 6–7^{(5–7)}, 4–6
Loss	2–2	Aug 2022	Winston-Salem Open, United States	ATP 250	Hard	(France) Adrian Mannarino	6–7^{(1–7)}, 4–6
Loss	2–3	Jul 2023	Hamburg European Open, Germany	ATP 500	Clay	(Germany) Alexander Zverev	5–7, 3–6
Win	3–3	Mar 2025	Chile Open, Chile	ATP 250	Clay	(Argentina) Sebastián Báez	6–4, 3–6, 7–5

== ATP Challenger Tour and ITF Futures finals ==
=== Singles: 27 (13 titles, 14 runner-ups) ===
Legend (singles) ATP Challenger Tour (4–10) ITF Futures (9–4)	Titles by surface Hard (2–1) Clay (11–13) Grass (0–0)

Result	W–L	Date	Tournament	Tier	Surface	Opponent	Score
Loss	0–1	Jun 2015	Czech Open, Czech Republic	Challenger	Clay	(Czech Republic) Jiří Veselý	4–6, 2–6
Loss	0–2	Jun 2016	Aspria Tennis Cup, Italy	Challenger	Clay	(Italy) Marco Cecchinato	2–6, 2–6
Loss	0–3	Aug 2016	Cortina International, Italy	Challenger	Clay	(Brazil) João Souza	4–6, 6–7^{(4–7)}
Loss	0–4	Jun 2017	Vicenza International, Italy	Challenger	Clay	(Hungary) Márton Fucsovics	6–4, 6–7^{(7)}, 2–6
Loss	0–5	Jun 2017	Poprad Challenger, Slovakia	Challenger	Clay	(Germany) Cedrik-Marcel Stebe	0–6, 3–6
Win	1–5	Jul 2017	Perugia International, Italy	Challenger	Clay	(Spain) Daniel Muñoz de la Nava	7–6^{(4)}, 6–4
Loss	1–6	Jul 2017	San Benedetto Tennis Cup, Italy	Challenger	Clay	(Italy) Matteo Berrettini	3–6, 4–6
Loss	1–7	Oct 2017	Almaty Challenger, Kazakhstan	Challenger	Clay	(Serbia) Filip Krajinović	0–6, 3–6
Loss	1–8	May 2018	Garden Open, Italy	Challenger	Clay	(Czech Republic) Adam Pavlásek	6–7^{(1)}, 7–6^{(9)}, 4–6
Loss	1–9	Jun 2018	Moneta Czech Open, Czech Republic	Challenger	Clay	(Spain) Jaume Munar	1–6, 3–6
Win	2–9	Jul 2018	Aspria Tennis Cup, Italy	Challenger	Clay	(Italy) Gianluca Mager	6–2, 6–1
Loss	2–10	May 2023	Sardegna Open, Italy	Challenger	Clay	(France) Ugo Humbert	6–4, 5–7, 4–6
Win	3–10	May 2026	Open de Oeiras II, Portugal	Challenger	Clay	(United States) Emilio Nava	6–3, 6–4
Win	4–10	Oct 2026	Ferrero Challenger, Spain	Challenger	Hard	(Estonia) Daniil Glinka	6–4, 6–4
Loss	0–1	Sep 2012	F12 Subotica, Serbia	Futures	Clay	(Slovakia) Jozef Kovalík	6–3, 0–6, 3–6
Win	1–1	Jul 2013	F6 Kikinda, Serbia	Futures	Clay	(Romania) Teodor-Dacian Crăciun	6–2, 6–1
Win	2–1	Sep 2013	F11 Zlatibor, Serbia	Futures	Clay	(Serbia) Peđa Krstin	7–6^{(0)}, 6–3
Loss	2–2	Nov 2013	F1 Nicosia, Cyprus	Futures	Clay	(Austria) Bastian Trinker	2–6, 3–6
Loss	2–3	Nov 2013	F2 Nicosia, Cyprus	Futures	Hard	(Czech Republic) Michal Schmid	4–6, 2–6
Win	3–3	May 2014	F8 Bol, Croatia	Futures	Clay	(Slovenia) Mike Urbanija	6–1, 6–2
Win	4–3	May 2014	F2 Prijedor, Bosnia Herzegovina	Futures	Clay	(Bosnia and Herzegovina) Tomislav Brkić	6–3, 6–2
Loss	4–4	Jun 2014	F1 Budapest, Hungary	Futures	Clay	(Sweden) Patrik Rosenholm	3–6, 7–5, 4–6
Win	5–4	Sep 2014	F13 Niš, Serbia	Futures	Clay	(Serbia) Ivan Bjelica	7–6^{(6)}, 6–4
Win	6–4	Dec 2014	F2 Dakar, Senegal	Futures	Hard	(Bosnia and Herzegovina) Aldin Šetkić	7–5, 2–6, 6–4
Win	7–4	Feb 2015	F3 Cairo, Egypt	Futures	Clay	(Poland) Kamil Majchrzak	6–3, 7–5
Win	8–4	Feb 2016	F6 Hammamet, Tunisia	Futures	Clay	(Austria) Pascal Brunner	1–6, 6–1, 7–6^{(5)}
Win	9–4	Apr 2017	F4 Opatija, Croatia	Futures	Clay	(Czech Republic) Zdeněk Kolář	7–5, 6–4

=== Doubles: 1 (1 runner–up) ===
Legend (doubles) ATP Challenger Tour (0–1) ITF Futures (0–0)	Titles by surface Hard (0–0) Clay (0–1) Grass (0–0)

Result	W–L	Date	Tournament	Tier	Surface	Partner	Opponents	Score
Loss	0–1	May 2015	Samarkand Challenger, Uzbekistan	Challenger	Clay	(Serbia) Peđa Krstin	(Belarus) Sergey Betov (Russia) Mikhail Elgin	4–6, 3–6

== ITF Junior Tour ==
=== ITF Junior Circuit Category GA finals ===
==== Singles: 2 (1 titles, 1 runner-up) ====
Result	W–L	Date	Tournament	Surface	Opponent	Score
Win	1–0	Dec 2012	Orange Bowl, United States	Clay	(Sweden) Elias Ymer	6–4, 6–4
Loss	1–1	May 2013	Trofeo Bonfiglio, Italy	Clay	(Germany) Alexander Zverev	6–7^{(5–7)}, 7–5, 5–7

== Wins against top 10 players ==
- Djere has a 3–19 (13.64%) record against players who were, at the time the match was played, ranked in the top 10.

Season	2019	2020	2021	2022	2023	2024	Total
Wins	2	0	0	0	1	0	3

#	Player	Rk	Event	Surface	Rd	Score	Rk	Ref
2019
1.	(Austria) Dominic Thiem	8	Rio Open, Brazil	Clay	1R	6–3, 6–3	90	
2.	(Argentina) Juan Martín del Potro	8	Madrid Open, Spain	Clay	2R	6–3, 2–6, 7–5	32	
2023
3.	(Norway) Casper Ruud	3	Auckland Open, New Zealand	Hard	2R	3–6, 6–3, 7–6^{(7–5)}	70	

- Key: (Rk) first use, opponent rank; (Rd) round; (Rk) 2nd use, player rank; (Ref) reference; (F) final; (SF) semifinal; (QF) quarterfinal; (#R) rounds 4, 3, 2, 1; (RR) round-robin stage; (Q#) qualifying rounds or stages (3), 2, 1.

== National and international representation ==
=== Davis Cup: 3 (1–2) ===
Group membership World Group (0–2) WG play-off (1–0) Group I (0–0) Group II (0–0)	Matches by surface Hard (0–0) Clay (1–2) Grass (0–0) Carpet (0–0)	Matches by Type Singles (1–2) Doubles (0–0)

- ▲ ▼ indicates the outcome of the Davis Cup match followed by the score, date, place of event, the zonal classification and its phase, and the court surface.

Rubber outcome	No.	Rubber	Match type (partner if any)	Opponent nation	Opponent player(s)	Score
▼1–3; September 15–17, 2017; Stade Pierre-Mauroy, Lille, France; World Group semifinal; clay surface
Defeat	1.	II	Singles	France	Jo-Wilfried Tsonga	6–7^{(4–7)}, 3–6, 3–6
▼1–3; February 2–4, 2018; Čair Sports Center, Niš, Serbia; World Group first round; clay surface
Defeat	2.	I	Singles	(United States) USA	Sam Querrey	7–6^{(7–4)}, 2–6, 5–7, 4–6
▲4–0; September 14–16, 2018; Kraljevo Sports Hall, Kraljevo, Serbia; World Group play-off; clay surface
Victory	3.	I	Singles	India	Ramkumar Ramanathan	3–6, 6–4, 7–6^{(7–2)}, 6–2

== See also ==
- Serbia Davis Cup team
- Sport in Serbia
- Fastest recorded tennis serves
