= 2021 Sardegna Open – Singles =

Singles
- 2021 Sardegna Open

Final
- Champion: (Italy) Lorenzo Sonego
- Runner-up: (Serbia) Laslo Đere
- Score: 2–6, 7–6^{(7–5)}, 6–4

Details
- Draw: 28
- Seeds: 8

Events
Singles	Doubles
- Sardegna Open

Lorenzo Sonego defeated defending champion Laslo Đere in the final, 2–6, 7–6^{(7–5)}, 6–4 to win the men's singles title at the 2021 Sardegna Open. With the victory, Sonego became the first Italian in 15 years to capture an ATP Tour title on home soil.

== Seeds ==
The top four seeds received a bye into the second round.

1. (United Kingdom) Dan Evans (second round)
2. (United States) Taylor Fritz (semifinals)
3. (Italy) Lorenzo Sonego (champion)
4. (Georgia (country)) Nikoloz Basilashvili (semifinals)
5. (Germany) Jan-Lennard Struff (quarterfinals)
6. (Australia) John Millman (second round)
7. (Argentina) Guido Pella (first round)
8. (United States) Tommy Paul (first round)

== Draw ==
Key

- Q = Qualifier
- WC = Wild card
- LL = Lucky loser
- Alt = Alternate
- ITF = ITF entry
- PR = Protected ranking
- SR = Special ranking
- SE = Special exempt
- JE = Junior exempt
- JR = Junior Accelerator Programme entrant
- CO = College Accelerator Programme entrant
- NG = Next Gen Accelerator Program entrant
- w/o = Walkover
- r = Retired
- d = Defaulted

=== Finals ===
Semifinals
(Serbia) Laslo Đere	6	6
4	(Georgia (country)) Nikoloz Basilashvili	2	0
3	(Italy) Lorenzo Sonego	6	5	6
2	(United States) Taylor Fritz	4	7	1

Final
(Serbia) Laslo Đere	6	6^{5}	4
3	(Italy) Lorenzo Sonego	2	7^{7}	6

=== Top half ===
First round
(Italy) L Musetti	6	6
(Austria) D Novak	0	1
WC	(Italy) F Gaio	4	2
(Serbia) L Đere	6	6
(Argentina) F Coria	6^{5}	6	3
6	(Australia) J Millman	7^{7}	3	6
Q	(India) S Nagal	6	1	3
Q	(Slovakia) J Kovalík	3	6	6
Q	(Switzerland) M-A Hüsler	1	3
Q	(United Kingdom) L Broady	6	6
(Portugal) J Sousa	6	1	5
5	(Germany) J-L Struff	1	6	7

Second round
1	(United Kingdom) D Evans	1	6	6^{8}
(Italy) L Musetti	6	1	7^{10}
(Serbia) L Đere	6	6
6	(Australia) J Millman	3	3
4	(Georgia (country)) N Basilashvili	4	6	7
Q	(Slovakia) J Kovalík	6	4	5
Q	(United Kingdom) L Broady	4	2
5	(Germany) J-L Struff	6	6

Quarterfinals
(Italy) L Musetti	4	6	2
(Serbia) L Đere	6	4	6
4	(Georgia (country)) N Basilashvili	7	4	6
5	(Germany) J-L Struff	5	6	3

Semifinals
(Serbia) L Đere	6	6
4	(Georgia (country)) N Basilashvili	2	0

=== Bottom half ===
First round
8	(United States) T Paul	6^{8}	7	3
(Germany) Y Hanfmann	7^{10}	5	6
(Italy) M Cecchinato	6	4	6
WC	(Italy) T Fabbiano	4	6	3
(France) G Simon	1	6	6
(Italy) S Travaglia	6	3	4
7	(Argentina) G Pella	4	0
(Belarus) E Gerasimov	6	6
(Slovenia) A Bedene	1	7	7^{7}
WC	(Italy) G Zeppieri	6	5	6^{3}
(Slovakia) A Martin	6	2	6
(Czech Republic) J Veselý	4	6	1

Second round
(Germany) Y Hanfmann	7	6
(Italy) M Cecchinato	5	1
(France) G Simon	4	1
3	(Italy) L Sonego	6	6
(Belarus) E Gerasimov	4	6^{5}
(Slovenia) A Bedene	6	7^{7}
(Slovakia) A Martin	2	6^{4}
2	(United States) T Fritz	6	7^{7}

Quarterfinals
(Germany) Y Hanfmann	6	6^{6}	3
3	(Italy) L Sonego	3	7^{8}	6
(Slovenia) A Bedene	3	4
2	(United States) T Fritz	6	6

Semifinals
3	(Italy) L Sonego	6	5	6
2	(United States) T Fritz	4	7	1

== Qualifying ==
=== Seeds ===
1. (Slovakia) Jozef Kovalík (qualified)
2. (Germany) Cedrik-Marcel Stebe (qualifying competition, retired)
3. (India) Sumit Nagal (qualified)
4. (Austria) Jurij Rodionov (qualifying competition)
5. (United States) Brandon Nakashima (first round)
6. (Switzerland) Marc-Andrea Hüsler (qualified)
7. (United States) Maxime Cressy (first round)
8. (United Kingdom) Liam Broady (qualified)

=== Qualifiers ===
1. (Slovakia) Jozef Kovalík
2. (Switzerland) Marc-Andrea Hüsler
3. (India) Sumit Nagal
4. (United Kingdom) Liam Broady

=== Qualifying draw ===
==== First qualifier ====
First round
1	(Slovakia) Jozef Kovalík	6	6
(Tunisia) Malek Jaziri	3	1
(Italy) Matteo Viola	6^{4}	6	6
5	(United States) Brandon Nakashima	7^{7}	1	2

Qualifying competition
1	(Slovakia) Jozef Kovalík	7^{7}	4	7^{7}
(Italy) Matteo Viola	6^{3}	6	6^{4}

==== Second qualifier ====
First round
2	(Germany) Cedrik-Marcel Stebe	6	6
(Australia) Matthew Ebden	2	3
(Russia) Teymuraz Gabashvili	4	4
6	(Switzerland) Marc-Andrea Hüsler	6	6

Qualifying competition
2	(Germany) Cedrik-Marcel Stebe	5	1^{r}
6	(Switzerland) Marc-Andrea Hüsler	7	1

==== Third qualifier ====
First round
3	(India) Sumit Nagal	6	6
(Italy) Andrea Pellegrino	3	4
(France) Maxime Janvier	6	6
7	(United States) Maxime Cressy	4	3

Qualifying competition
3	(India) Sumit Nagal	6	6
(France) Maxime Janvier	2	1

==== Fourth qualifier ====
First round
4	(Austria) Jurij Rodionov	6	7^{7}
WC	(Italy) Francesco Forti	4	6^{4}
WC	(Italy) Jacopo Berrettini	4	1
8	(United Kingdom) Liam Broady	6	6

Qualifying competition
4	(Austria) Jurij Rodionov	5	6	0
8	(United Kingdom) Liam Broady	7	4	6
