= Sardegna Open =

Tournament information
- Event name: Sardegna Open
- Location: Cagliari, Italy
- Category: ATP Challenger Tour 175
- Surface: Clay
- Draw: 28S/16Q/16D
- Prize money: €205,000 (2024)
- Website: Website

The Sardegna Open is a professional tennis tournament part of the ATP Challenger Tour played on clay courts in Cagliari, Italy. It was primarily organised as an ATP 250 tournament due to the cancellation of many tournaments during the 2020 season, because of the COVID-19 pandemic. In its first edition the tournament was known as Forte Village Sardegna Open and it has been an ATP Tour event in its first two editions (2020 and 2021). It was downgraded to a Challenger 175 event in 2023, 2024 and after a year hiatus it came back in 2026.

== Past finals ==
=== Singles ===
Year	Champion	Runner-up	Score
↓ ATP 250 ↓
2020	(Serbia) Laslo Djere	(Italy) Marco Cecchinato	7–6^{(7–3)}, 7–5
2021	(Italy) Lorenzo Sonego	(Serbia) Laslo Djere	2–6, 7–6^{(7–5)}, 6–4
2022	Not held		
↓ ATP Challenger Tour ↓
2023	(France) Ugo Humbert	(Serbia) Laslo Djere	4–6, 7–5, 6–4
2024	(Argentina) Mariano Navone	(Italy) Lorenzo Musetti	7–5, 6–1
2025	Not held		
2026	(Italy) Matteo Arnaldi	(Poland) Hubert Hurkacz	6–4, 6–4

=== Doubles ===
Year	Champions	Runners-up	Score
↓ ATP 250 ↓
2020	(New Zealand) Marcus Daniell (Austria) Philipp Oswald	(Colombia) Juan Sebastián Cabal (Colombia) Robert Farah	6–3, 6–4
2021	(Italy) Lorenzo Sonego (Italy) Andrea Vavassori	(Italy) Simone Bolelli (Argentina) Andrés Molteni	6–3, 6–4
2022	Not held		
↓ ATP Challenger Tour ↓
2023	(Austria) Alexander Erler (Austria) Lucas Miedler	(Argentina) Máximo González (Argentina) Andrés Molteni	7–6^{(8–6)}, 6–3
2024	(India) Sriram Balaji (Germany) Andre Begemann	(Bolivia) Boris Arias (Bolivia) Federico Zeballos	6–4, 6–7^{(3–7)}, [10–6]
2025	Not held		
2026	(Belgium) Sander Gillé (Netherlands) Sem Verbeek	(Czech Republic) Petr Nouza (Austria) Neil Oberleitner	4–6, 6–3, [10–4]
