= Lorenzo Sonego =

Italian tennis player (born 1995)

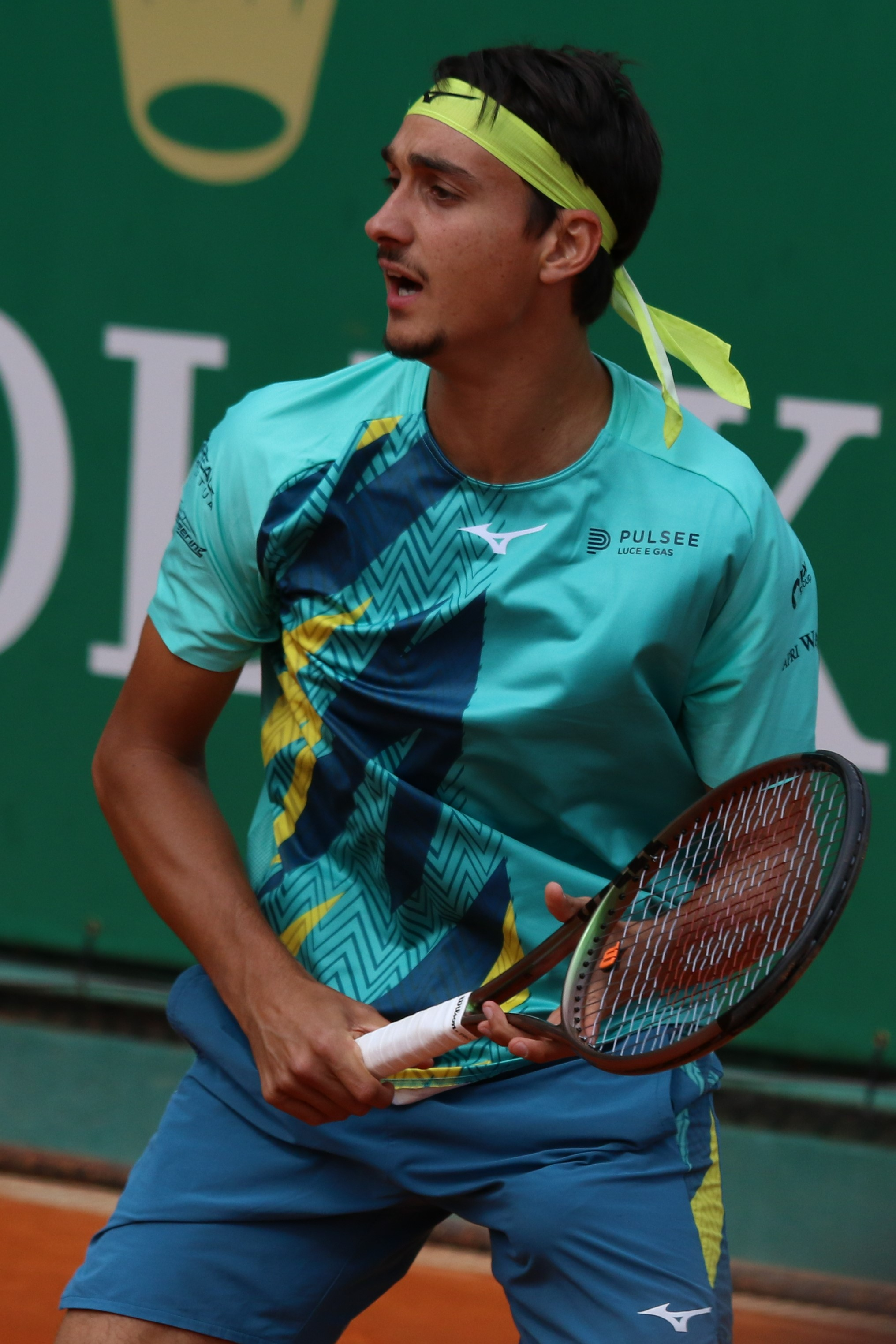
- Sonego at the 2022 Monte-Carlo Masters
- Country (sports): Italy
- Born: 11 May 1995 (age 31) Turin, Italy
- Height: 1.91 m (6 ft 3 in)
- Turned pro: 2013
- Plays: Right-handed (two-handed backhand)
- Coach: Fabio Colangelo (2024–Nov 2025)
- Prize money: US $10,141,347

Singles
- Career record: 178–198
- Career titles: 4
- Highest ranking: No. 21 (4 October 2021)
- Current ranking: No. 89 (31 August 2026)

Grand Slam singles results
- Australian Open: QF (2025)
- French Open: 4R (2020, 2023)
- Wimbledon: 4R (2021, 2025)
- US Open: 2R (2018, 2019, 2023)

Other tournaments
- Olympic Games: 2R (2021)

Doubles
- Career record: 51–53
- Career titles: 3
- Highest ranking: No. 60 (12 September 2022)
- Current ranking: No. 278 (31 August 2026)

Grand Slam doubles results
- Australian Open: 2R (2021)
- French Open: 2R (2019, 2022)
- Wimbledon: 1R (2024)
- US Open: 3R (2022)

Other doubles tournaments
- Olympic Games: 2R (2021)

Team competitions
- Davis Cup: W (2023, 2025)
- Last updated on: 1 September 2026.

Lorenzo Sonego (Italian pronunciation: [loˈrɛntso ˈsɔːneɡo]; born 11 May 1995) is an Italian professional tennis player and singer. He has a career-high ATP singles ranking of world No. 21, achieved on 4 October 2021 and a best doubles ranking of No. 60, reached on 12 September 2022. He is currently the No. 7 singles player from Italy.

Sonego has won four singles titles on the ATP Tour, and three in doubles. His most notable career achievement to date is the quarterfinal he reached at the 2025 Australian Open.

Sonego was part of the Italian team that won the Davis Cup in 2023 and 2025.

== Early life ==
Sonego was born in Turin, Italy. He began playing tennis when he was 11 years old, encouraged by his father Giorgio and his coach Gipo Arbino. A fan of Italian football club Torino, he played for the Torino youth academy between the age of six and 13 before focusing on tennis.

== Professional career ==
=== 2016–2017: ATP debut, first Challenger title ===
Sonego made his ATP Tour debut in May 2016 at the Italian Open, where he received a wild card and lost against João Sousa in the first round.

On 17 October 2017 he won his first Challenger title, defeating Tim Pütz at the 2017 Sparkassen ATP Challenger.

=== 2018: Grand Slam debut ===
Sonego started his Grand Slam career with a win over Robin Haase at the 2018 Australian Open. He was then defeated in the second round by Richard Gasquet.

Sonego entered 2018 Wimbledon as a lucky loser after being defeated by Ernests Gulbis in the third round of qualifying. He was defeated by Taylor Fritz in the first round in straight sets.

=== 2019: First ATP title, Masters 1000 quarterfinal ===
Sonego, as a qualifier, reached the quarterfinals of Monte-Carlo, upsetting 8th seed Karen Khachanov on the way. He lost to eventual runner-up Dušan Lajović in straight sets.

Sonego won his first ATP title in Antalya, Turkey in June 2019, defeating Serbian Miomir Kecmanović in three sets in the final.

=== 2020: Major fourth round, ATP 500 final, win over World No. 1 ===
Sonego made a career-best 4th round appearance at the 2020 French Open, defeating Emilio Gómez, Alexander Bublik, and 27th seed Taylor Fritz before losing to 12th seed Diego Schwartzman in straight sets. His match against Fritz had the longest tiebreak in French Open history in the third set, finishing eventually with a 19–17 score in favor of Sonego.

At the 2020 Erste Bank Open, Sonego, as a lucky loser, shocked world No. 1 Novak Djokovic in straight sets 6-2 6–1. It was only Djokovic's third loss of the year. Sonego went on to make the final of the event, but lost to fifth seed Andrey Rublev 4–6, 4–6.

=== 2021: Wimbledon fourth round, Masters semifinal, top 25 ===
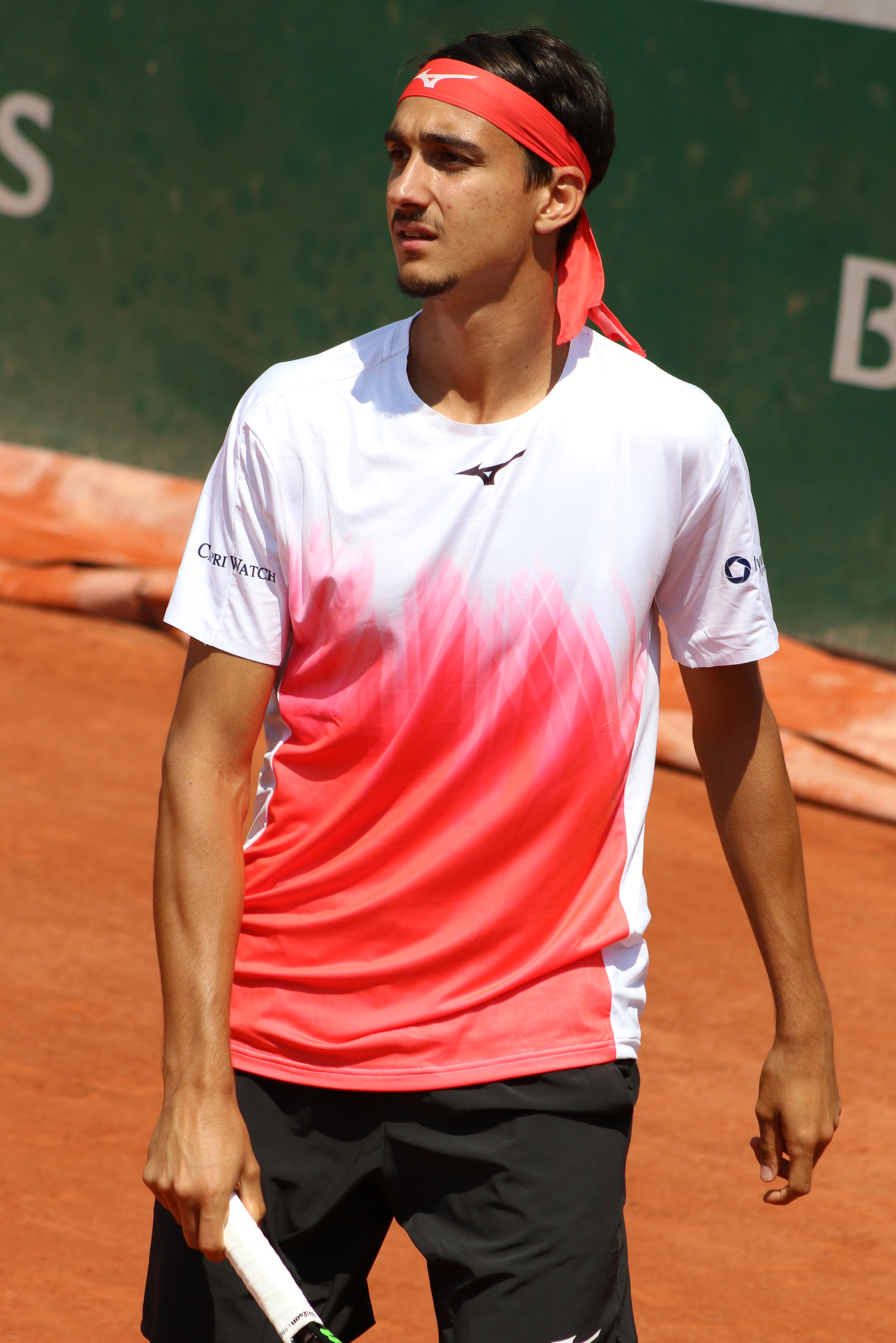
Sonego at the 2021 French Open

At the 2021 Sardegna Open in April, Sonego won both the singles and doubles titles. As a result, he achieved career-high singles ranking of world No. 28 and doubles ranking of No. 132 on 12 April 2021.

In Rome, Sonego scored his second top-10 win over Dominic Thiem, beating him in 3 sets in a match lasting over 3 hours. As a result, he made his second Masters quarterfinal, where he beat 7th seed Andrey Rublev, his third top-10 win. In the semifinal, he once again faced World No. 1 and defending champion Novak Djokovic but lost in 3 sets. At the French Open, Sonego lost in the first round to Lloyd Harris in straight sets.

In June, he reached his fourth final in his career and second for 2021 at the 2021 Eastbourne International where he lost to Alex de Minaur.

His next tournament was Queen's Club Championships, where he lost in the first round in straight sets to Viktor Troicki.

Following his fourth-round showing at the 2021 Wimbledon Championships for the first time in his career, he reached a career-high of World No. 25 on 9 August 2021. He ended up being the final player to ever be beaten by Roger Federer on the ATP Tour.

=== 2022: Drop in rankings, three Major third rounds, third ATP title ===
Sonego started his 2022 season at the Sydney Classic. Seeded fifth, he reached the quarterfinals where he lost to top seed and eventual champion, Aslan Karatsev. Seeded 25th at the Australian Open, he made it to the third round where he was defeated by Miomir Kecmanović.

Seeded fourth at the Córdoba Open, Sonego lost in the quarterfinals to sixth seed, last year finalist, and eventual champion, Albert Ramos Viñolas. Seeded third at the Argentina Open, he reached the semifinals where he was eliminated by second seed and defending champion, Diego Schwartzman. Seeded sixth at the Rio Open, he fell in the second round to qualifier Miomir Kecmanović. At the Mexican Open, he lost in the first round to qualifier J. J. Wolf. Representing Italy in the Davis Cup tie against Slovakia, Sonego played one match and lost to Filip Horanský. In the end, Italy won the tie over Slovakia 3–2. Seeded 21st at the Indian Wells Masters, he was ousted from the tournament in the second round by Benjamin Bonzi. Seeded 19th at the Miami Open, he lost in the second round to American qualifier Denis Kudla.

Sonego started his clay-court season at the Monte-Carlo Masters. Seeded 16th, he lost in the second round to Laslo Đere. Seeded 11th at the Barcelona Open, he was defeated in the third round by eighth seed and eventual finalist, Pablo Carreño Busta. In Madrid, he lost in the first round to British wildcard Jack Draper. Last year semifinalist at the Italian Open, he lost in a controversial first-round match to 13th seed Denis Shapovalov. Due to not defending his semifinalist points from last year, Sonego's ranking fell from 28 to 35. Seeded 32nd at the French Open, he reached the third round where he lost to eighth seed and eventual finalist, Casper Ruud, in five sets.

Sonego began his grass-court season at the BOSS Open in Stuttgart, Germany. Seeded sixth, he made it to the quarterfinals where he lost to second seed, compatriot, and eventual champion, Matteo Berrettini. At the Queen's Club Championships, he was defeated in the first round by lucky loser Denis Kudla. Last year finalist at the Eastbourne International, he fell in the second round to sixth seed and defending champion, Alex de Minaur, in a rematch of previous year's final. Seeded 27th at Wimbledon, he reached the third round where he was beaten by second seed, two-time champion, and former world no. 1, Rafael Nadal.

After Wimbledon, Sonego competed at the Swedish Open. He lost in the first round to Aslan Karatsev. In Gstaad, Switzerland, he was defeated in the first round by qualifier Juan Pablo Varillas.

At the 2022 Moselle Open he defeated Alexander Bublik in the final to win his third ATP title. As a result, he climbed 20 positions up in the top 50 in the rankings to world No. 45 on 26 September 2022.

=== 2023: 100th career wins, Miami & French Opens fourth rounds ===
Sonego started his 2023 season at the Adelaide International 1. He retired during the second set of his first-round match against third seed and world No. 7, Daniil Medvedev, due to a right arm injury. At the Adelaide International 2, he lost in the first round to Jack Draper. At the Australian Open, he lost in the second round to 10th seed and world No. 11, Hubert Hurkacz, in five sets.

In February, Sonego competed at the Open Sud de France. He reached the quarterfinals where he lost to second seed, world No. 17, compatriot, and eventual champion, Jannik Sinner. In Rotterdam, he was defeated in the first round by third seed, world No. 8, and defending champion, Félix Auger-Aliassime. At the Qatar ExxonMobil Open, he put up a fight, but he lost in the first round to two-time champion, former world No. 1, and eventual finalist, Andy Murray, in three sets, despite having three match points in the third set. At the Dubai Championships, he upset fourth seed and world No. 9, Félix Auger-Aliassime, in the second round for his first top 10 win of the season. He was eliminated in the quarterfinals by seventh seed and world No. 16, Alexander Zverev.

At the 2023 BNP Paribas Open he lost to Jason Kubler. In Miami he defeated Dominic Thiem and upset 23rd seed Dan Evans to reach the third round, recording his 100th career win. Next he defeated 12th seed Frances Tiafoe in straight sets to move to the fourth round, where he lost to Francisco Cerúndolo.

At the 2023 French Open he reached the fourth round for a second time in his career defeating world No. 7 Andrey Rublev in a five set thriller rallying from two sets to love down for the first time in his career, his first top-10 win at a Major.

At the 2023 Rolex Shanghai Masters he defeated qualifier Philip Sekulic and again tenth seed Frances Tiafoe to reach the third round for a third time in the season at a Masters 1000 level.

=== 2024–2025: Major quarterfinal, ATP title ===
Ranked No. 57 at the 2024 Monte-Carlo Masters, he entered as a lucky loser directly into the second round as a replacement for third seed Carlos Alcaraz after his late withdrawal due to injury, and defeated Felix Auger-Aliassime being 2-5 down in the second set to reach the round of 16.

Seeded tenth at the 2024 Winston-Salem Open, he reached his first ATP semifinal since July 2023 with a win over 15th seed Pavel Kotov, where he defeated David Goffin to reach his first final since 2022 and sixth overall. He won his fourth title over 11th seed Alex Michelsen in a little over an hour in straight sets. He became the 11th active player to have won on all surfaces grass, clay and hard. As a result, he returned to the top 50 in the singles rankings on 26 August 2024.

He reached the quarterfinals at the 2025 Australian Open for the first time at a Grand Slam event but lost to 21st seed Ben Shelton.

== Performance timelines ==
Key
W	F	SF	QF	#R	RR	Q#	P#	DNQ	A	Z#	PO	G	S	B	NMS	NTI	P	NH

(W) winner; (F) finalist; (SF) semifinalist; (QF) quarterfinalist; (#R) rounds 4, 3, 2, 1; (RR) round-robin stage; (Q#) qualification round; (P#) preliminary round; (DNQ) did not qualify; (A) absent; (Z#) Davis/Fed Cup Zonal Group (with number indication) or (PO) play-off; (G) gold, (S) silver or (B) bronze Olympic/Paralympic medal; (NMS) not a Masters tournament; (NTI) not a Tier I tournament; (P) postponed; (NH) not held; (SR) strike rate (events won / competed); (W–L) win–loss record.
To avoid confusion and double counting, these charts are updated at the conclusion of a tournament or when the player's participation has ended.

=== Singles ===
Tournament	2014	2015	2016	2017	2018	2019	2020	2021	2022	2023	2024	2025	2026	SR	W–L	Win %
Grand Slam tournaments
Australian Open	A	A	A	A	2R	Q3	1R	2R	3R	2R	2R	QF	2R	0 / 8	11–8	59%
French Open	A	A	A	A	Q2	1R	4R	1R	3R	4R	2R	1R	2R	0 / 8	10–8	56%
Wimbledon	A	A	A	A	1R	1R	NH	4R	3R	1R	2R	4R	3R	0 / 7	11–8	56%
US Open	A	A	A	A	2R	2R	1R	1R	1R	2R	1R	1R	1R	0 / 9	3–9	25%
Win–loss	0–0	0–0	0–0	0–0	2–3	1–3	3–3	4–4	6–4	5–4	3–4	7–4	4-4	0 / 33	35–33	52%
ATP Masters 1000 tournaments
Indian Wells Open	A	A	A	A	A	A	NH	2R	2R	1R	2R	1R	A	0 / 5	1–5	17%
Miami Open	A	A	A	A	A	2R	NH	4R	2R	4R	1R	2R	A	0 / 6	7–6	54%
Monte-Carlo Masters	A	A	A	A	Q1	QF	NH	2R	2R	2R	3R	1R	A	0 / 6	7–6	54%
Madrid Open	A	A	A	A	A	A	NH	A	1R	1R	2R	2R	1R	0 / 5	2–5	29%
Italian Open	A	A	1R	Q1	2R	1R	2R	SF	1R	3R	1R	1R	1R	0 / 10	8–10	44%
Canadian Open	A	A	A	A	A	A	NH	1R	A	1R	2R	3R	1R	0 / 5	2–5	29%
Cincinnati Open	A	A	A	A	A	1R	1R	3R	1R	2R	Q2	3R	2R	0 / 7	5–7	42%
Shanghai Masters	A	A	A	A	A	1R	NH			3R	1R	1R	Q1	0 / 4	2–4	33%
Paris Masters	A	A	A	A	A	Q1	2R	1R	1R	Q1	1R	3R	1R	0 / 6	3–6	33%
Win–loss	0–0	0–0	0–1	0–0	1–1	4–5	2–3	10–7	1–7	9–8	4–8	6–9	1–5	0 / 54	37–54	41%
Career statistics
	2014	2015	2016	2017	2018	2019	2020	2021	2022	2023	2024	2025	2026	Career		
Tournaments	0	0	1	0	6	24	14	22	29	28	29	29	5	189		
Titles	0	0	0	0	0	1	0	1	1	0	1	0	0	4		
Finals	0	0	0	0	0	1	1	2	1	0	1	0	0	6		
Overall win–loss	0–0	0–0	0–1	0–0	5–6	20–23	12–14	30–24	26–29	29–29	20–29	25–29	3–4	170–188		
Win (%)	–	–	0%	–	45%	47%	46%	56%	47%	50%	41%	46%	43%	48%		
Year-end ranking	812	370	300	212	107	52	33	27	45	46	53	40		$10,141,347		

== ATP Masters 1000 finals ==
=== Doubles: (1 runner-up) ===
Result	Year	Tournament	Surface	Partner	Opponents	Score
Loss	2025	Cincinnati Open	Hard	(Italy) Lorenzo Musetti	(Croatia) Nikola Mektić (United States) Rajeev Ram	6–4, 3–6, [5–10]

== ATP Tour finals ==
=== Singles: 6 (4 titles, 2 runner-ups) ===
Legend Grand Slam (–) ATP 1000 (–) ATP 500 (0–1) ATP 250 (4–1)	Finals by surface Hard (2–1) Clay (1–0) Grass (1–1)	Finals by setting Outdoor (3–1) Indoor (1–1)

Result	W–L	Date	Tournament	Tier	Surface	Opponent	Score
Win	1–0	Jun 2019	Antalya Open, Turkey	ATP 250	Grass	(Serbia) Miomir Kecmanović	6–7^{(5–7)}, 7–6^{(7–5)}, 6–1
Loss	1–1	Oct 2020	Vienna Open, Austria	ATP 500	Hard (i)	(Russia) Andrey Rublev	4–6, 4–6
Win	2–1	Apr 2021	Sardegna Open, Italy	ATP 250	Clay	(Serbia) Laslo Đere	2–6, 7–6^{(7–5)}, 6–4
Loss	2–2	Jun 2021	Eastbourne International, United Kingdom	ATP 250	Grass	(Australia) Alex de Minaur	6–4, 4–6, 6–7^{(5–7)}
Win	3–2	Sep 2022	Moselle Open, France	ATP 250	Hard (i)	(Kazakhstan) Alexander Bublik	7–6^{(7–3)}, 6–2
Win	4–2	Aug 2024	Winston-Salem Open, United States	ATP 250	Hard	(United States) Alex Michelsen	6–0, 6–3

=== Doubles: 5 (3 titles, 2 runner-ups) ===
Legend Grand Slam (–) ATP 1000 (0–1) ATP 500 (–) ATP 250 (3–1)	Finals by surface Hard (1–2) Clay (2–0) Grass (–)	Finals by setting Outdoor (3–2) Indoor (–)

Result	W–L	Date	Tournament	Tier	Surface	Partner	Opponents	Score
Win	1–0	Apr 2021	Sardegna Open, Italy	ATP 250	Clay	(Italy) Andrea Vavassori	(Italy) Simone Bolelli (Argentina) Andrés Molteni	6–3, 6–4
Win	2–0	Jul 2022	Austrian Open Kitzbühel, Austria	ATP 250	Clay	(Spain) Pedro Martínez	(Germany) Tim Pütz (New Zealand) Michael Venus	5–7, 6–4, [10–8]
Loss	2–1	Feb 2024	ATP Qatar Open, Qatar	ATP 250	Hard	(Italy) Lorenzo Musetti	(United Kingdom) Jamie Murray (New Zealand) Michael Venus	6–7^{(0–7)}, 6–2, [8–10]
Loss	2–2	Aug 2025	Cincinnati Open, United States	ATP 1000	Hard	(Italy) Lorenzo Musetti	(Croatia) Nikola Mektić (United States) Rajeev Ram	6–4, 3–6, [5–10]
Win	3–2	Jan 2026	Hong Kong Open, China SAR	ATP 250	Hard	(Italy) Lorenzo Musetti	Karen Khachanov; Andrey Rublev	6–4, 2–6, [10–1]

== ATP Challenger and ITF Tour finals ==
=== Singles: 11 (6 titles, 5 runner-ups) ===
Legend ATP Challenger Tour (3–1) ITF Futures (3–4)	Finals by surface Hard (–) Clay (5–4) Carpet (1–1)

Result	W–L	Date	Tournament	Tier	Surface	Opponent	Score
Win	1–0	Oct 2017	Sparkassen Challenger, Italy	Challenger	Carpet (i)	(Germany) Tim Pütz	6–4, 6–4
Loss	1–1	Oct 2017	Wolffkran Open, Germany	Challenger	Carpet (i)	(Germany) Yannick Hanfmann	4–6, 6–3, 5–7
Win	2–1	Sep 2018	AON Open, Italy	Challenger	Clay	(Germany) Dustin Brown	6–2, 6–1
Win	3–1	Sep 2019	AON Open, Italy (2)	Challenger	Clay	(Spain) Alejandro Davidovich Fokina	6–2, 4–6, 7–6^{(8–6)}
Loss	0–1	May 2015	F11 Lecco, Italy	Futures	Clay	(United States) Tommy Paul	1–6, 4–6
Win	1–1	Sep 2015	F26 Santa Margherita di Pula, Italy	Futures	Clay	(Germany) Daniel Altmaier	7–5, 6–4
Win	2–1	Oct 2015	F32 Santa Margherita di Pula, Italy	Futures	Clay	(Germany) George von Massow	6–4, 6–1
Loss	2–2	Nov 2015	F33 Santa Margherita di Pula, Italy	Futures	Clay	(Italy) Gianluca Mager	3–6, 3–6
Win	3–2	Oct 2017	F31 Santa Margherita di Pula, Italy	Futures	Clay	(Spain) Javier Martí	6–3, 3–1, ret.
Loss	3–3	Oct 2017	F35 Santa Margherita di Pula, Italy	Futures	Clay	(Italy) Federico Gaio	6–7^{(4–7)}, 6–2, 0–6
Loss	3–4	Nov 2017	F36 Santa Margherita di Pula, Italy	Futures	Clay	(Bosnia and Herzegovina) Tomislav Brkić	5–7, 4–6

== Wins over top 10 players ==
- Sonego has a 7–35 record against players who were, at the time the match was played, ranked in the top 10.
- As of 29 October 2025

Season	2020	2021	2022	2023	2024	2025	Total
Wins	1	2	1	2	0	1	7

#	Player	Rk	Event	Surface	Rd	Score	LSR
2020
1.	(Serbia) Novak Djokovic	1	Vienna Open, Austria	Hard (i)	QF	6–2, 6–1	42
2021
2.	(Austria) Dominic Thiem	4	Italian Open, Italy	Clay	3R	6–4, 6–7^{(5–7)}, 7–6^{(7–5)}	33
3.	(Russia) Andrey Rublev	7	Italian Open, Italy	Clay	QF	3–6, 6–4, 6–3	33
2022
4.	(Poland) Hubert Hurkacz	10	Moselle Open, France	Hard (i)	SF	7–6^{(7–5)}, 6–4	65
2023
5.	(Canada) Félix Auger-Aliassime	9	Dubai Tennis Championships, UAE	Hard	2R	7–6^{(7–4)}, 6–4	67
6.	Andrey Rublev	7	French Open, France	Clay	3R	5–7, 0–6, 6–3, 7–6^{(7–5)}, 6–3	48
2025
7.	(Italy) Lorenzo Musetti	8	Paris Masters, France	Hard (i)	2R	3–6, 6–3, 6–1	45

== Music ==
Sonego has released four singles, all alongside AlterEdo: "Un solo secondo" (2021), which has amassed 1.6 million streams on Spotify; "SWING" (2022), "Cielo Aperto" (2023), and "MIA MADAMA" (2025).
