= Alex de Minaur career statistics =

Professional tennis player

Career finals
Discipline	Type	Won	Lost	Total
Singles	Grand Slam	–	–	–
Singles	ATP Finals	–	–	–
Singles	ATP 1000	0	1	1
Singles	ATP 500	4	7	11
Singles	ATP 250	7	4	11
Singles	Olympics	–	–	–
Singles	Total	11	12	23
Doubles	ATP 1000	1	0	1
Doubles	ATP 500	–	–	–
Doubles	ATP 250	–	–	–
Doubles	Total	12	12	24

This is a list of the main career statistics of Australian professional tennis player Alex de Minaur. All statistics are per the ATP Tour and ITF websites.

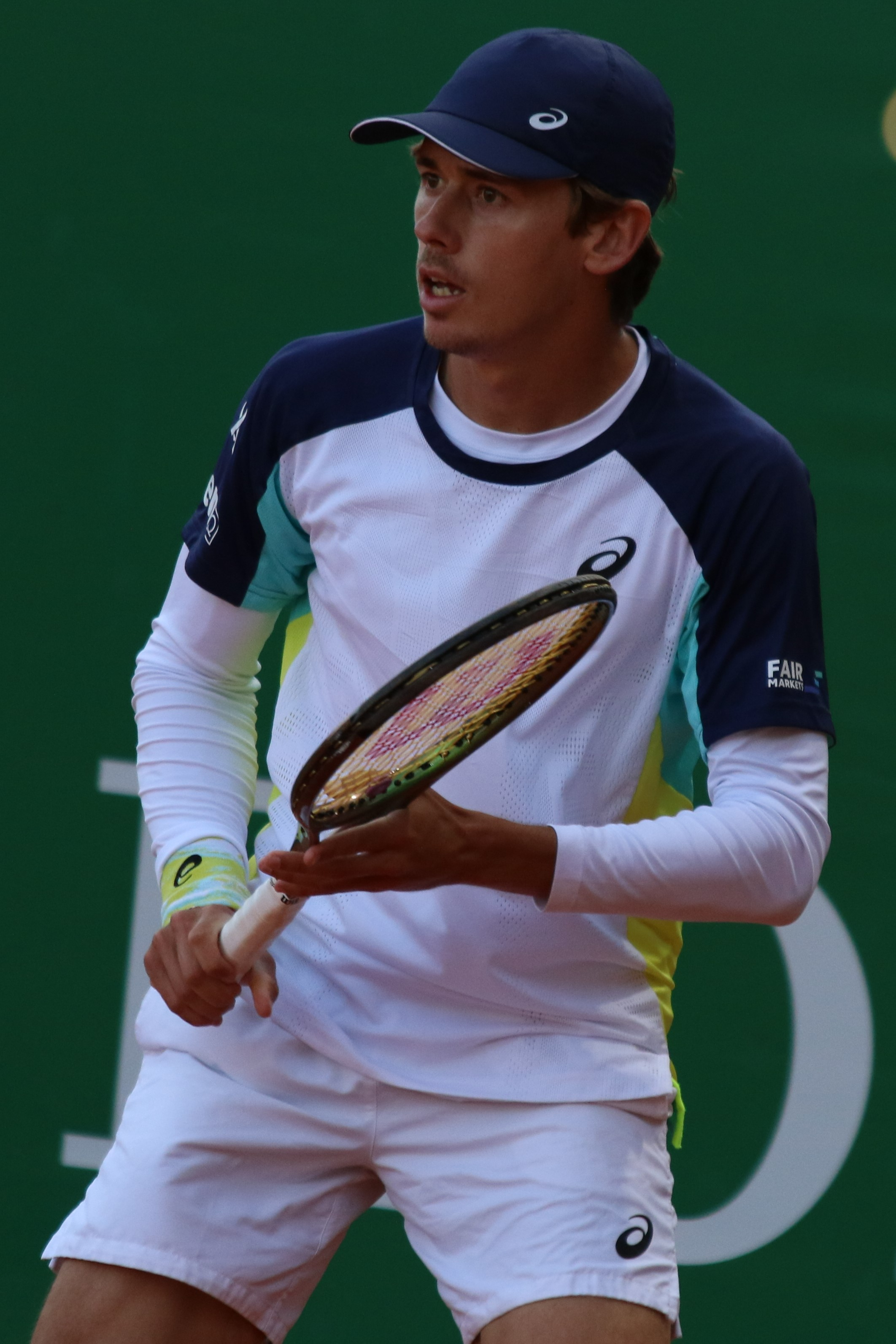
De Minaur at the 2022 Monte-Carlo Masters

== Performance timeline ==
Key
W	F	SF	QF	#R	RR	Q#	DNQ	A	NH

(W) winner; (F) finalist; (SF) semifinalist; (QF) quarterfinalist; (#R) rounds 4, 3, 2, 1; (RR) round-robin stage; (Q#) qualification round; (DNQ) did not qualify; (A) absent; (NH) not held; (SR) strike rate (events won / competed); (W–L) win–loss record.
To avoid confusion and double counting, these charts are updated at the conclusion of a tournament or when the player's participation has ended.

=== Singles ===
Current through the 2026 ATP Tour.

Tournament	2016	2017	2018	2019	2020	2021	2022	2023	2024	2025	2026	SR	W–L	Win %
Grand Slam tournaments
Australian Open	Q1	2R	1R	3R	A	3R	4R	4R	4R	QF	QF	0 / 9	22–9	71%
French Open	A	1R	1R	2R	1R	2R	1R	2R	QF	2R	3R (Note: De Minaur received a walkover in the second round, which does not count as a win.)	0 / 10	9–10	47%
Wimbledon	A	Q2	3R	2R	NH	1R	4R	2R	QF (Note: De Minaur received a walkover in the third round, which does not count as a win; he later withdrew in the quarterfinals, which does not count as a loss.)	4R	4R	0 / 8	16–7	70%
US Open	A	1R	3R	4R	QF	1R	3R	4R	QF	QF	2R	0 / 10	23–10	70%
Win–loss	0–0	1–3	4–4	7–4	4–2	3–4	8–4	8–4	14–3	12–4	9–4	0 / 37	70–36	66%
Year-end championships
ATP Finals	DNQ								RR	SF	Alt	0 / 2	1–6	14%
National representation
Summer Olympics	A	NH				A	NH		A	NH		0 / 0	0–0	–
Davis Cup	A	A	1R	QF	RR		F	F	SF	2R		0 / 7	17–10	63%
ATP 1000
Indian Wells Open	A	Q2	2R	2R	NH	4R	4R	2R	4R	4R	3R	0 / 8	10–8	56%
Miami Open	A	A	1R	A	NH	2R	3R	2R	4R	4R	2R	0 / 7	5–7	42%
Monte-Carlo Masters	A	A	A	A	NH	1R	2R	2R	QF	SF	QF	0 / 6	10–6	63%
Madrid Open	A	A	A	1R	NH	3R	2R	3R	2R	4R	2R	0 / 7	6–7	46%
Italian Open	A	A	A	1R	1R	1R	3R	2R	4R	4R	2R	0 / 8	5–8	38%
Canadian Open	A	A	A	1R	NH	2R	3R	F	A	QF	3R	0 / 6	10–6	63%
Cincinnati Open	A	A	A	3R	1R	2R	2R	2R	A	2R	4R	0 / 7	7–7	50%
Shanghai Masters	A	A	3R	1R	NH			2R	A	QF	QF	0 / 5	7–5	58%
Paris Masters	A	A	1R	3R	3R	1R	3R	QF	QF	QF	2R	0 / 9	14–9	61%
Win–loss	0–0	0–0	3–4	4–7	2–3	5–8	12–8	10–9	12–6	18–9	8–9	0 / 63	74–63	54%
Career statistics
	2016	2017	2018	2019	2020	2021	2022	2023	2024	2025	2026	Total		
Tournaments	0	5	20	23	8	24	24	24	19	22	22	Career total: 191		
Titles	0	0	0	3	0	2	1	1	2	1	1	Career total: 11		
Finals	0	0	2	4	1	2	1	4	3	2	4	Career total: 23		
Hard win–loss	0–0	2–4	25–16	38–13	13–8	13–17	31–15	36–18	30–15	43–17	31–13	9 / 125	262–136	66%
Clay win–loss	0–0	0–1	1–4	1–4	0–2	4–5	9–6	4–5	10–5	10–5	7–6	0 / 41	46–43	52%
Grass win–loss	0–0	0–0	2–3	2–3	0–0	8–3	7–4	6–3	7–1	3–2	8–3	2 / 25	43–22	66%
Overall win–loss	0–0	2–5	28–23	41–20	13–10	25–25	47–25	46–26	47–21	56–24	46–22	11 / 191	351–201	64%
Win %	–	29%	55%	67%	57%	50%	65%	64%	69%	70%	68%	Career total: 64%		
Year-end ranking	349	208	31	18	23	34	24	12	9	7	11	$28,043,960		

=== Doubles ===
Current through the 2026 Canadian Open.

Tournament	2017	2018	2019	2020	2021	2022	2023	2024	2025	2026	SR	W–L
Grand Slam tournaments
Australian Open	1R	A	A	A	1R	A	A	A	A	A	0 / 2	0–2
French Open	A	A	1R	2R	2R	A	A	A	A	A	0 / 3	2–3
Wimbledon	A	1R	2R	NH	1R	A	A	A	A	A	0 / 3	1–3
US Open	A	A	2R	A	1R	A	A	A	A	A	0 / 2	1–2
Win–loss	0–1	0–1	2–3	1–1	1–4	0–0	0–0	0–0	0–0	0–0	0 / 10	4–10
ATP 1000
Indian Wells Open	A	A	A	NH	1R	A	A	A	A	1R	0 / 2	0–2
Miami Open	A	A	A	NH	A	1R	A	1R	A	1R	0 / 3	0–3
Monte-Carlo Masters	A	A	A	NH	1R	1R	A	A	QF	1R	0 / 4	2–4
Madrid Open	A	A	A	NH	A	A	1R	1R	A	A	0 / 2	0–2
Italian Open	A	A	A	1R	1R	A	QF	1R	A	A	0 / 4	2–4
Canadian Open	A	A	2R	NH	1R	2R	1R	A	1R	A	0 / 5	2–5
Cincinnati Open	A	A	A	W	QF	2R	A	A	A	A	1 / 3	8–3
Shanghai Masters	A	1R	1R	NH			2R	A	A	A	0 / 3	1–3
Paris Masters	A	A	1R	A	1R	A	A	A	A		0 / 2	0–2
Win–loss	0–0	0–1	1–3	6–2	2–6	2–4	3–4	0–3	2–2	0–3	1 / 29	15–27
National representation
Summer Olympics	NH				A	NH		1R	NH		0 / 1	0–1
Career statistics
	2017	2018	2019	2020	2021	2022	2023	2024	2025	2026	Career	
Tournaments	1	6	10	5	14	9	7	6	4	4	66	
Titles	0	0	0	1	0	0	0	0	0	0	1	
Finals	0	0	0	1	0	0	0	0	0	0	1	
Overall win–loss	0–1	1–6	7–10	8–4	8–14	4–9	6–7	0–6	3–4	0–4	37–65	
Win %	0%	14%	41%	67%	36%	31%	45%	0%	43%	0%	36%	
Year-end ranking	1139	406	141	59	135	197	178	553	361			

== ATP 1000 tournaments finals ==
=== Singles: 1 (runner-up) ===
Result	Year	Tournament	Surface	Opponent	Score
Loss	2023	Canadian Open	Hard	(Italy) Jannik Sinner	4–6, 1–6

=== Doubles: 1 (title) ===
Result	Year	Tournament	Surface	Partner	Opponents	Score
Win	2020	Cincinnati Open	Hard	(Spain) Pablo Carreño Busta	(United Kingdom) Jamie Murray (United Kingdom) Neal Skupski	6–2, 7–5

== ATP Tour finals ==
=== Singles: 23 (11 titles, 12 runner-ups) ===
Legend ATP 1000 (0–1) ATP 500 (4–7) ATP 250 (7–4)	Finals by surface Hard (9–10) Grass (2–2)	Finals by setting Outdoor (10–7) Indoor (1–5)

Result	W–L	Date	Tournament	Tier	Surface	Opponent	Score
Loss	0–1	Jan 2018	Sydney International, Australia	ATP 250	Hard	(Russia) Daniil Medvedev	6–1, 4–6, 5–7
Loss	0–2	Aug 2018	Washington Open, United States	ATP 500	Hard	(Germany) Alexander Zverev	2–6, 4–6
Win	1–2	Jan 2019	Sydney International, Australia	ATP 250	Hard	(Italy) Andreas Seppi	7–5, 7–6^{(7–5)}
Win	2–2	Jul 2019	Atlanta Open, United States	ATP 250	Hard	(United States) Taylor Fritz	6–3, 7–6^{(7–2)}
Win	3–2	Sep 2019	Zhuhai Championships, China	ATP 250	Hard	(France) Adrian Mannarino	7–6^{(7–4)}, 6–4
Loss	3–3	Oct 2019	Swiss Indoors, Switzerland	ATP 500	Hard (i)	(Switzerland) Roger Federer	2–6, 2–6
Loss	3–4	Oct 2020	European Open, Belgium	ATP 250	Hard (i)	(France) Ugo Humbert	1–6, 6–7^{(4–7)}
Win	4–4	Jan 2021	Antalya Open, Turkey	ATP 250	Hard	(Kazakhstan) Alexander Bublik	2–0 ret.
Win	5–4	Jun 2021	Eastbourne International, United Kingdom	ATP 250	Grass	(Italy) Lorenzo Sonego	4–6, 6–4, 7–6^{(7–5)}
Win	6–4	Jul 2022	Atlanta Open, United States (2)	ATP 250	Hard	(United States) Jenson Brooksby	6–3, 6–3
Win	7–4	Feb 2023	Mexican Open, Mexico	ATP 500	Hard	(United States) Tommy Paul	3–6, 6–4, 6–1
Loss	7–5	Jun 2023	Queen's Club Championships, United Kingdom	ATP 500	Grass	(Spain) Carlos Alcaraz	4–6, 4–6
Loss	7–6	Aug 2023	Los Cabos Open, Mexico	ATP 250	Hard	(Greece) Stefanos Tsitsipas	3–6, 4–6
Loss	7–7	Aug 2023	Canadian Open, Canada	ATP 1000	Hard	(Italy) Jannik Sinner	4–6, 1–6
Loss	7–8	Feb 2024	Rotterdam Open, Netherlands	ATP 500	Hard (i)	(Italy) Jannik Sinner	5–7, 4–6
Win	8–8	Feb 2024	Mexican Open, Mexico (2)	ATP 500	Hard	(Norway) Casper Ruud	6–4, 6–4
Win	9–8	Jun 2024	Libéma Open, Netherlands	ATP 250	Grass	(United States) Sebastian Korda	6–2, 6–4
Loss	9–9	Feb 2025	Rotterdam Open, Netherlands	ATP 500	Hard (i)	(Spain) Carlos Alcaraz	4–6, 6–3, 2–6
Win	10–9	Jul 2025	Washington Open, United States	ATP 500	Hard	(Spain) Alejandro Davidovich Fokina	5–7, 6–1, 7–6^{(7–3)}
Win	11–9	Feb 2026	Rotterdam Open, Netherlands	ATP 500	Hard (i)	(Canada) Félix Auger-Aliassime	6–3, 6–2
Loss	11–10	Jun 2026	Libéma Open, Netherlands	ATP 250	Grass	(Poland) Kamil Majchrzak	3–6, 6–2, 6–7^{(5–7)}
Loss	11–11	Oct 2026	China Open, China	ATP 500	Hard	(Serbia) Novak Djokovic	6–7^{(3–7)}, 1–0 ret.
Loss	11–12	Oct 2026	Vienna Open, Austria	ATP 500	Hard (i)	(Spain) Carlos Alcaraz	1–6, 4–6

=== Doubles: 1 (title) ===
Legend ATP 1000 (1–0)	Finals by surface Hard (1–0)	Finals by setting Outdoor (1–0)

Result	Date	Tournament	Tier	Surface	Partner	Opponents	Score
Win	Aug 2020	Cincinnati Open, United States	ATP 1000	Hard	(Spain) Pablo Carreño Busta	(United Kingdom) Jamie Murray (United Kingdom) Neal Skupski	6–2, 7–5

== ATP Next Generation finals ==
=== Singles: 2 (2 runner-ups) ===
Result	Date	Tournament	Surface	Opponent	Score
Loss	Nov 2018	Next Generation ATP Finals, Italy	Hard (i)	(Greece) Stefanos Tsitsipas	4–2, 1–4, 3–4^{(3–7)}, 3–4^{(3–7)}
Loss	Nov 2019	Next Generation ATP Finals, Italy	Hard (i)	(Italy) Jannik Sinner	2–4, 1–4, 2–4

== Junior Grand Slam finals ==
=== Singles: 1 (runner-up) ===
Result	Year	Tournament	Surface	Opponent	Score
Loss	2016	Wimbledon	Grass	(Canada) Denis Shapovalov	6–4, 1–6, 3–6

=== Doubles: 1 (title) ===
Result	Year	Tournament	Surface	Partner	Opponents	Score
Win	2016	Australian Open	Hard	(Australia) Blake Ellis	(Slovakia) Lukáš Klein (Czech Republic) Patrik Rikl	3–6, 7–5, [12–10]

== National and international representation ==
=== Team competitions finals: 4 (2 titles, 2 runner-ups) ===
Finals by tournament Davis Cup (0–2) Laver Cup (2–0)	Finals by team Australia (0–2) World (2–0)

Result	Date	Tournament	Surface	Team	Teammates	Opponent team	Opponents	Score
Win	Sep 2022	Laver Cup, London	Hard (i)	Team World	Félix Auger-Aliassime; Taylor Fritz; Diego Schwartzman; Frances Tiafoe; Jack Sock	Team Europe	Casper Ruud; Rafael Nadal; Stefanos Tsitsipas; Novak Djokovic; Andy Murray; Roger Federer; Matteo Berrettini; Cameron Norrie	13–8
Loss	Nov 2022	Davis Cup, Málaga	Hard (i)	Australia	Jordan Thompson; Thanasi Kokkinakis; Max Purcell; Matthew Ebden	Canada	Félix Auger-Aliassime; Denis Shapovalov; Vasek Pospisil; Alexis Galarneau; Gabriel Diallo	0–2
Loss	Nov 2023	Davis Cup, Málaga	Hard (i)	Australia	Alexei Popyrin; Max Purcell; Jordan Thompson; Matthew Ebden	Italy	Jannik Sinner; Lorenzo Musetti; Matteo Arnaldi; Lorenzo Sonego; Simone Bolelli	0–2
Win	Sep 2025	Laver Cup, San Francisco	Hard (i)	Team World	Taylor Fritz; Francisco Cerúndolo; Alex Michelsen; João Fonseca; Reilly Opelka	Team Europe	Carlos Alcaraz; Alexander Zverev; Holger Rune; Casper Ruud; Jakub Menšík; Flavio Cobolli	15–9

== Exhibition matches ==
Result	Date	Tournament	Surface	Opponent	Score
Win	Oct 2020	Ultimate Tennis Showdown, Antwerp, Belgium	Hard (i)	(France) Richard Gasquet	24–9, 15–14, 20–10
Win	Jan 2024	Australian Open Opening Week Charity Match, Melbourne, Australia	Hard	(Spain) Carlos Alcaraz	6–4, 5–7, [10–3]
Loss	Feb 2024	Ultimate Tennis Showdown, Oslo, Norway	Hard	(Russia) Andrey Rublev	16–14, 10–17, 13–16, 12–20
Loss	Jan 2026	Australian Open Opening Week, Melbourne, Australia	Hard	(Spain) Carlos Alcaraz	3–6, 4–6

== Career Grand Slam statistics ==
=== Grand Slam tournament seedings ===
Legend seeded No. 4–10 (0 / 10) seeded No. 11–32 (0 / 19) unseeded (0 / 8)	Longest streak 5 14 5

Year	Australian Open	French Open	Wimbledon	US Open
2016	Did not qualify	Did not play		
2017	Wildcard	Wildcard	Did not qualify	Wildcard
2018	Wildcard	Wildcard	Unseeded	Unseeded
2019	27th	21st	25th	Unseeded
2020	Did not play	25th	cancelled (Note: Due to the COVID-19 pandemic, the 2020 edition of the Wimbledon Championships was cancelled.)	21st
2021	21st	21st	15th	14th
2022	32nd	19th	19th	18th
2023	22nd	18th	15th	13th
2024	10th	11th	9th	10th
2025	8th	9th	11th	8th
2026	6th	8th	5th	6th

=== Best Grand Slam tournament results details ===
Grand Slam winners are in boldface, and runner-ups are in italics (at time of matches played).

Australian Open
2025 Australian Open (8th seed)
Round	Opponent	Rank	Score
1R	(Netherlands) Botic van de Zandschulp	84	6–1, 7–5, 6–4
2R	(United States) Tristan Boyer (Q)	136	6–2, 6–4, 6–3
3R	(Argentina) Francisco Cerúndolo (31)	31	5–7, 7–6^{(7–3)}, 6–3, 6–3
4R	(United States) Alex Michelsen	42	6–0, 7–6^{(7–5)}, 6–3
QF	**(Italy) Jannik Sinner (1)**	**1**	3–6, 2–6, 1–6
2026 Australian Open (6th seed)
Round	Opponent	Rank	Score
1R	(United States) Mackenzie McDonald (LL)	113	6–2, 6–2, 6–3
2R	(Serbia) Hamad Medjedovic	90	6–7^{(5–7)}, 6–2, 6–2, 6–1
3R	(United States) Frances Tiafoe (29)	34	6–3, 6–4, 7–5
4R	(Kazakhstan) Alexander Bublik (10)	10	6–4, 6–1, 6–1
QF	**(Spain) Carlos Alcaraz (1)**	**1**	5–7, 2–6, 1–6

Wimbledon
2024 Wimbledon (9th seed)
Round	Opponent	Rank	Score
1R	(Australia) James Duckworth (LL)	81	7–6^{(7–1)}, 7–6^{(7–3)}, 7–6^{(7–4)}
2R	(Spain) Jaume Munar	63	6–2, 6–2, 7–5
3R	(France) Lucas Pouille (Q)	212	Walkover
4R	(France) Arthur Fils	34	6–2, 6–4, 4–6, 6–3
QF	(Serbia) Novak Djokovic (2)	2	Walkover

French Open
2024 French Open (11th seed)
Round	Opponent	Rank	Score
1R	(United States) Alex Michelsen	60	6–1, 6–0, 6–2
2R	(Spain) Jaume Munar	64	7–5, 6–1, 6–4
3R	(Germany) Jan-Lennard Struff	41	4–6, 6–4, 6–3, 6–3
4R	Daniil Medvedev (5)	5	4–6, 6–2, 6–1, 6–3
QF	(Germany) Alexander Zverev (4)	4	4–6, 6–7^{(5–7)}, 4–6

US Open
2020 US Open (21st seed)
Round	Opponent	Rank	Score
1R	(Slovakia) Andrej Martin	98	6–4, 6–3, 7–5
2R	(France) Richard Gasquet	51	6–4, 6–3, 6–7^{(6–8)}, 7–5
3R	(Russia) Karen Khachanov (11)	16	6–4, 0–6, 4–6, 6–3, 6–1
4R	(Canada) Vasek Pospisil	94	7–6^{(8–6)}, 6–3, 6–2
QF	**(Austria) Dominic Thiem (2)**	3	1–6, 2–6, 4–6
2024 US Open (10th seed)
Round	Opponent	Rank	Score
1R	(United States) Marcos Giron	46	6–3, 6–4, 5–7, 6–4
2R	(Finland) Otto Virtanen (Q)	125	7–5, 6–1, 7–6^{(7–3)}
3R	(United Kingdom) Dan Evans	184	6–3, 6–7^{(4–7)}, 6–0, 6–0
4R	(Australia) Jordan Thompson	32	6–0, 3–6, 6–3, 7–5
QF	(United Kingdom) Jack Draper (25)	25	3–6, 5–7, 2–6
2025 US Open (8th seed)
Round	Opponent	Rank	Score
1R	(Australia) Christopher O'Connell	81	6–3, 6–4, 6–4
2R	(Japan) Shintaro Mochizuki (Q)	112	6–2, 6–4, 6–2
3R	(Germany) Daniel Altmaier	56	6–7^{(7–9)}, 6–3, 6–4, 2–0 ret.
4R	(Switzerland) Leandro Riedi (Q)	435	6–3, 6–2, 6–1
QF	(Canada) Félix Auger-Aliassime (25)	27	6–4, 6–7^{(7–9)}, 5–7, 6–7^{(4–7)}

== Wins against top 10 players ==
- De Minaur has a 24–65 (26.97%) record against players who were, at the time the match was played, ranked in the top 10.

Season	2019	2020	2021	2022	2023	2024	2025	2026	Total
Wins	3	1	0	3	6	5	2	4	24

#	Opponent	Rk	Event	Surface	Rd	Score	Rk	Ref
2019
1.	(Japan) Kei Nishikori	7	US Open, United States	Hard	3R	6–2, 6–4, 2–6, 6–3	38	
2.	(Spain) Roberto Bautista Agut	10	Zhuhai Championships, China	Hard	SF	6–2, 6–2	31	
3.	(Spain) Roberto Bautista Agut	10	Paris Masters, France	Hard (i)	2R	7–6^{(7–2)}, 7–6^{(7–1)}	18	
2020
4.	(Germany) Alexander Zverev	7	ATP Cup, Australia	Hard	RR	4–6, 7–6^{(7–3)}, 6–2	18	
2022
5.	(Italy) Matteo Berrettini	7	ATP Cup, Australia	Hard	RR	6–3, 7–6^{(7–4)}	34	
6.	(United Kingdom) Cameron Norrie	10	Barcelona Open, Spain	Clay	QF	6–3, 5–7, 6–1	25	
7.	Daniil Medvedev	3	Paris Masters, France	Hard (i)	2R	6–4, 2–6, 7–5	25	
2023
8.	(Spain) Rafael Nadal	2	United Cup, Australia	Hard	RR	3–6, 6–1, 7–5	24	
9.	Andrey Rublev	5	Rotterdam Open, Netherlands	Hard (i)	1R	6–4, 6–4	25	
10.	(Denmark) Holger Rune	9	Mexican Open, Mexico	Hard	SF	3–6, 7–5, 6–2	23	
11.	(Denmark) Holger Rune	6	Queen's Club, United Kingdom	Grass	SF	6–3, 7–6^{(7–2)}	18	
12.	(United States) Taylor Fritz	9	Canadian Open, Canada	Hard	3R	7–6^{(9–7)}, 4–6, 6–1	18	
13.	Daniil Medvedev	3	Canadian Open, Canada	Hard	QF	7–6^{(9–7)}, 7–5	18	
2024
14.	(United States) Taylor Fritz	10	United Cup, Australia	Hard	RR	6–4, 6–2	12	
15.	(Serbia) Novak Djokovic	1	United Cup, Australia	Hard	QF	6–4, 6–4	12	
16.	(Germany) Alexander Zverev	7	United Cup, Australia	Hard	SF	5–7, 6–3, 6–4	12	
17.	Andrey Rublev	5	Rotterdam Open, Netherlands	Hard (i)	QF	7–6^{(7–5)}, 4–6, 6–3	11	
18.	Daniil Medvedev	5	French Open, France	Clay	4R	4–6, 6–2, 6–1, 6–3	11	
2025
19.	(Germany) Alexander Zverev	3	Laver Cup, United States	Hard (i)	RR	6–1, 6–4	8	
20.	(United States) Taylor Fritz	6	ATP Finals, Italy	Hard (i)	RR	7–6^{(7–3)}, 6–3	7	
2026
21.	(Kazakhstan) Alexander Bublik	10	Australian Open, Australia	Hard	4R	6–4, 6–1, 6–1	6	
22.	(Canada) Félix Auger-Aliassime	6	Rotterdam Open, Netherlands	Hard	F	6–3, 6–2	8	
23.	(Germany) Alexander Zverev	2	Laver Cup, United Kingdom	Hard (i)	RR	2–6, 7–6^{(7–5)}, [11–9]	9	
24.	(Germany) Alexander Zverev	2	Vienna Open, Austria	Hard (i)	SF	6–4, 1–6, 7–6^{(7–4)}	10	

* as of 31 October 2026.
