= 2023 Zhuhai Championships – Doubles =

Doubles
- 2023 Zhuhai Championships

Final
- Champions: (United Kingdom) Jamie Murray (New Zealand) Michael Venus
- Runners-up: (United States) Nathaniel Lammons (United States) Jackson Withrow
- Score: 6–4, 6–4

Events
Singles	Doubles
← 2019 ·	Zhuhai Championships

Jamie Murray and Michael Venus defeated Nathaniel Lammons and Jackson Withrow in the final, 6–4, 6–4 to win the doubles title at the 2023 Zhuhai Championships.

Sander Gillé and Joran Vliegen were the reigning champions from 2019, when the tournament was last held, but lost in the semifinals to Lammons and Withrow.

== Seeds ==
1. (Belgium) Sander Gillé / (Belgium) Joran Vliegen (semifinals)
2. (United Kingdom) Jamie Murray / (New Zealand) Michael Venus (champions)
3. (United States) Nathaniel Lammons / (United States) Jackson Withrow (final)
4. (Austria) Alexander Erler / (Austria) Lucas Miedler (quarterfinals)

== Draw ==
=== Key ===
- Q = Qualifier
- WC = Wild card
- LL = Lucky loser
- Alt = Alternate
- SE = Special exempt
- PR = Protected ranking
- ITF = ITF entry
- JE = Junior exempt
- w/o = Walkover
- r = Retired
- d = Defaulted
- SR = Special ranking

=== Draw ===
First round
1	(Belgium) S Gillé (Belgium) J Vliegen	6	6
(Australia) A Harris (Australia) R Hijikata	2	2
(United States) E King (United States) R Stalder	6	6
WC	(China) Y Mo (China) X Wang	4	3
3	(United States) N Lammons (United States) J Withrow	7	6
(Japan) T Matsui (Japan) Y Nishioka	5	4
(India) A Chandrasekar (India) VS Prashanth	6	4	[10]
(India) A Kadhe (Pakistan) A-u-H Qureshi	2	6	[6]
PR	(India) S Balaji (Germany) A Begemann	6^{3}	3
(United States) S Korda (United States) M McDonald	7^{7}	6
(Mexico) MÁ Reyes-Varela (Spain) D Vega Hernández	1	6^{4}
4	(Austria) A Erler (Austria) L Miedler	6	7^{7}
WC	(China) X Gao (China) Z Li	7^{7}	7^{7}
Alt	(Australia) M Polmans (Australia) MC Romios	6^{4}	6^{4}
(Argentina) TM Etcheverry (Chile) C Garín	4	4
2	(United Kingdom) J Murray (New Zealand) M Venus	6	6

Quarterfinals
1	(Belgium) S Gillé (Belgium) J Vliegen	7	7^{7}
(United States) E King (United States) R Stalder	5	6^{5}
3	(United States) N Lammons (United States) J Withrow	6	7^{7}
(India) A Chandrasekar (India) VS Prashanth	4	6^{4}
(United States) S Korda (United States) M McDonald	6	7
4	(Austria) A Erler (Austria) L Miedler	4	5
WC	(China) X Gao (China) Z Li	4	4
2	(United Kingdom) J Murray (New Zealand) M Venus	6	6

Semifinals
1	(Belgium) S Gillé (Belgium) J Vliegen	6^{8}	6	[6]
3	(United States) N Lammons (United States) J Withrow	7^{10}	4	[10]
(United States) S Korda (United States) M McDonald	3	7^{7}	[2]
2	(United Kingdom) J Murray (New Zealand) M Venus	6	6^{4}	[10]

Final
3	(United States) N Lammons (United States) J Withrow	4	4
2	(United Kingdom) J Murray (New Zealand) M Venus	6	6
