= 2023 Zhuhai Championships – Singles =

Singles
- 2023 Zhuhai Championships

Final
- Champion: Karen Khachanov
- Runner-up: (Japan) Yoshihito Nishioka
- Score: 7–6^{(7–2)}, 6–1

Details
- Draw: 28 (4 Q / 3 WC )
- Seeds: 8

Events
Singles	Doubles
← 2019 ·	Zhuhai Championships

Karen Khachanov defeated Yoshihito Nishioka in the final, 7–6^{(7–2)}, 6–1 to win the singles title at the 2023 Zhuhai Championships. It was his fifth ATP Tour singles title and first since 2018.

Alex de Minaur was the reigning champion from 2019, when the tournament was last held, but chose not to participate this year.

== Seeds ==
The top four seeds received a bye into the second round.

1. Karen Khachanov (champion)
2. (United Kingdom) Cameron Norrie (quarterfinals)
3. (Germany) Jan-Lennard Struff (quarterfinals)
4. (United States) Sebastian Korda (semifinals)
5. (Argentina) Tomás Martín Etcheverry (quarterfinals)
6. (United States) Mackenzie McDonald (quarterfinals)
7. (United Kingdom) Andy Murray (second round)
8. (Japan) Yoshihito Nishioka (final)

== Draw ==
Key

- Q = Qualifier
- WC = Wild card
- LL = Lucky loser
- Alt = Alternate
- ITF = ITF entry
- PR = Protected ranking
- SR = Special ranking
- SE = Special exempt
- JE = Junior exempt
- JR = Junior Accelerator Programme entrant
- CO = College Accelerator Programme entrant
- NG = Next Gen Accelerator Program entrant
- w/o = Walkover
- r = Retired
- d = Defaulted

=== Finals ===
Semifinals
1	Karen Khachanov	7	6
4	(United States) Sebastian Korda	5	4
8	(Japan) Yoshihito Nishioka	6	6
Aslan Karatsev	4	4

Final
1	Karen Khachanov	7^{7}	6
8	(Japan) Yoshihito Nishioka	6^{2}	1

=== Top half ===
First round
Q	(Australia) A Bolt	6	4
(Argentina) D Schwartzman	3	2^{r}
(United States) A Kovacevic	6^{4}	1
(Belgium) K Coppejans	7^{7}	6
(China) J Shang	4	7^{7}	3
6	(United States) M McDonald	6	6^{3}	6
(France) A Müller	6	6
(Australia) R Hijikata	3	2
WC	(China) Z Li	4	3
(Czech Republic) D Svrčina	6	6
Q	(Australia) L Saville	4	4
5	(Argentina) TM Etcheverry	6	6

Second round
1	K Khachanov	6	6
Q	(Australia) A Bolt	4	4
(Belgium) K Coppejans	6	3	2
6	(United States) M McDonald	4	6	6
4	(United States) S Korda	6	2	6
(France) A Müller	1	6	3
(Czech Republic) D Svrčina	2	3
5	(Argentina) TM Etcheverry	6	6

Quarterfinals
1	K Khachanov	4	6	6
6	(United States) M McDonald	6	4	4
4	(United States) S Korda	6	6
5	(Argentina) TM Etcheverry	1	2

Semifinals
1	K Khachanov	7	6
4	(United States) S Korda	5	4

=== Bottom half ===
First round
8	(Japan) Y Nishioka	0	6	6
(France) T Atmane	6	4	2
(South Africa) L Harris	6	6
PR	(Czech Republic) J Veselý	4	2
WC	(China) Y Zhou	6	4	2
(Chile) C Garín	4	6	6
7	(United Kingdom) A Murray	7	6
WC	(China) Y Mo	5	3
(Italy) M Arnaldi	7^{7}	6^{5}	2
A Karatsev	6^{5}	7^{7}	6
Q	(Australia) M Polmans	6	6
Q	(Australia) D Sweeny	3	1

Second round
8	(Japan) Y Nishioka	7^{7}	7^{7}
(South Africa) L Harris	6^{4}	6^{5}
(Chile) C Garín	3	6	4
3	(Germany) J-L Struff	6	1	6
7	(United Kingdom) A Murray	6	3	2
A Karatsev	4	6	6
Q	(Australia) M Polmans	0	3
2	(United Kingdom) C Norrie	6	6

Quarterfinals
8	(Japan) Y Nishioka	6	7
3	(Germany) J-L Struff	4	5
A Karatsev	7^{7}	7^{7}
2	(United Kingdom) C Norrie	6^{5}	6^{5}

Semifinals
8	(Japan) Y Nishioka	6	6
A Karatsev	4	4

== Qualifying ==
=== Seeds ===
1. (Australia) Marc Polmans (qualified)
2. (Australia) Dane Sweeny (qualified)
3. (Italy) Stefano Napolitano (qualifying competition)
4. (Italy) Lorenzo Giustino (first round)
5. (Czech Republic) Dominik Palán (qualifying competition)
6. (France) Arthur Weber (qualifying competition)
7. (Australia) Luke Saville (qualified)
8. (Switzerland) Antoine Bellier (qualifying competition)

=== Qualifiers ===
1. (Australia) Marc Polmans
2. (Australia) Dane Sweeny
3. (Australia) Luke Saville
4. (Australia) Alex Bolt

=== Qualifying draw ===
==== First qualifier ====
First round
1	(Australia) Marc Polmans	6	6
WC	(China) Dong Bohua	0	2
(Latvia) Robert Strombachs	6	1	6^{4}
6	(France) Arthur Weber	4	6	7^{7}

Qualifying competition
1	(Australia) Marc Polmans	6	6
6	(France) Arthur Weber	3	0

==== Second qualifier ====
First round
2	(Australia) Dane Sweeny	1	6	6
(Poland) Filip Peliwo	6	2	2
WC	(China) Wang Chukang	3	6	6^{5}
5	(Czech Republic) Dominik Palán	6	2	7^{7}

Qualifying competition
2	(Australia) Dane Sweeny	4	6	6
5	(Czech Republic) Dominik Palán	6	3	4

==== Third qualifier ====
First round
3	(Italy) Stefano Napolitano	6	6
(United States) Omni Kumar	2	0
(Greece) Stefanos Sakellaridis	5	7^{8}	4
7	(Australia) Luke Saville	7	6^{6}	6

Qualifying competition
3	(Italy) Stefano Napolitano	3	2
7	(Australia) Luke Saville	6	6

==== Fourth qualifier ====
First round
4	(Italy) Lorenzo Giustino	4	3
(Australia) Alex Bolt	6	6
(Northern Mariana Islands) Colin Sinclair	3	4
8	(Switzerland) Antoine Bellier	6	6

Qualifying competition
(Australia) Alex Bolt	6	7^{7}
8	(Switzerland) Antoine Bellier	4	6^{0}
