= 2025 ABN AMRO Open =

- Date: 3–9 February
- Edition: 52nd
- Category: ATP Tour 500
- Draw: 32S / 16D
- Surface: Hard (indoor)
- Location: Rotterdam, Netherlands
- Venue: Rotterdam Ahoy

Champions

Singles
- (Spain) Carlos Alcaraz

Doubles
- (Italy) Simone Bolelli / (Italy) Andrea Vavassori
- Rotterdam Open

The 2025 ABN AMRO Open was a men's tennis tournament played on indoor hard courts. It took place at the Rotterdam Ahoy in the Dutch city of Rotterdam, between 3 February and 9 February 2025. It was the 52nd edition of the Rotterdam Open, and part of the ATP Tour 500 series on the 2025 ATP Tour. The tournament also included a wheelchair tennis singles and doubles draw for both men and women. First-seeded Carlos Alcaraz won the singles title.

== Finals ==
=== Singles ===
- (Spain) Carlos Alcaraz defeated (Australia) Alex de Minaur, 6–4, 3–6, 6–2

=== Doubles ===
- (Italy) Simone Bolelli / (Italy) Andrea Vavassori defeated (Belgium) Sander Gillé / (Poland) Jan Zieliński, 6–2, 4–6, [10–6]

== Point distribution ==
Event	W	F	SF	QF	Round of 16	Round of 32	Q	Q2	Q1
Singles	500	330	200	100	50	0	25	13	0
Doubles	500	300	180	90	0	—N/a	45	25	0

=== Prize money ===
Event	W	F	SF	QF	Round of 16	Round of 32	Q2	Q1
Singles	€449,160	€241,650	€128,785	€65,795	€35,120	€18,730	€9,600	€5,385
Doubles*	€147,520	€78,670	€38,800	€19,910	€10,300	—N/a	—N/a	—N/a
Doubles prize money per team

== Singles main-draw entrants ==
=== Seeds ===
Country	Player	Ranking^{1}	Seed
ESP	Carlos Alcaraz	3	1
	Daniil Medvedev	7	2
AUS	Alex de Minaur	8	3
	Andrey Rublev	10	4
DEN	Holger Rune	12	5
GRE	Stefanos Tsitsipas	13	6
FRA	Arthur Fils	19	7
POL	Hubert Hurkacz	21	8

- ^{1} Rankings are as of 27 January 2025.

=== Other entrants ===
The following players received wildcards into the main draw:

- (Netherlands) Mees Röttgering
- (Greece) Stefanos Tsitsipas
- (Netherlands) Botic van de Zandschulp
- (Switzerland) Stan Wawrinka

The following player received a special exempt into the main draw:

- (United States) Aleksandar Kovacevic

The following players received entry from the qualifying draw:

- (Italy) Mattia Bellucci
- (France) Constant Lestienne
- (France) Harold Mayot
- (Italy) Andrea Vavassori

The following player received entry as a lucky loser:

- (Germany) Daniel Altmaier

=== Withdrawals ===
- (Bulgaria) Grigor Dimitrov → replaced by (Spain) Roberto Bautista Agut
- (United Kingdom) Jack Draper → replaced by (Belgium) David Goffin
- (United States) Sebastian Korda → replaced by (Hungary) Fábián Marozsán
- (France) Giovanni Mpetshi Perricard → replaced by (Germany) Daniel Altmaier
- (Italy) Jannik Sinner → replaced by (Czech Republic) Jakub Menšík
- (Australia) Jordan Thompson → replaced by (Italy) Lorenzo Sonego

== Doubles main-draw entrants ==
=== Seeds ===
Country	Player	Country	Player	Rank^{1}	Seed
ESA	Marcelo Arévalo	CRO	Mate Pavić	2	1
GER	Kevin Krawietz	GER	Tim Pütz	15	2
ITA	Simone Bolelli	ITA	Andrea Vavassori	21	3
CRO	Nikola Mektić	NZL	Michael Venus	27	4

- ^{1} Rankings as of 27 January 2025.

=== Other entrants ===
The following pairs received wildcards into the doubles main draw:

- (Netherlands) Tallon Griekspoor / (Netherlands) Botic van de Zandschulp
- (Netherlands) Robin Haase / (Netherlands) Sem Verbeek

The following pair received entry from the qualifying draw:

- (Germany) Jakob Schnaitter / (Germany) Mark Wallner

The following pair received entry as lucky losers:

- (Czech Republic) Petr Nouza / (Czech Republic) Patrik Rikl

=== Withdrawals ===
- (India) Yuki Bhambri / (France) Giovanni Mpetshi Perricard → replaced by (Czech Republic) Petr Nouza / (Czech Republic) Patrik Rikl
- (Croatia) Ivan Dodig / (Tunisia) Skander Mansouri → replaced by (Croatia) Ivan Dodig / (China) Zhang Zhizhen
- (Poland) Hubert Hurkacz / (United States) Sebastian Korda → replaced by (Poland) Hubert Hurkacz / (Czech Republic) Jakub Menšík
