= 2023 Zhuhai Championships =

Male tennis tournament

- Date: 20–26 September
- Edition: 2nd
- Category: ATP Tour 250 series
- Draw: 28S / 16D
- Surface: Hard / outdoor
- Location: Zhuhai, China
- Venue: Hengqin International Tennis Center

Champions

Singles
- Karen Khachanov

Doubles
- (United Kingdom) Jamie Murray / (New Zealand) Michael Venus
- Zhuhai Championships

The 2023 Zhuhai Championships (also known as the Huafa Properties Zhuhai Championships for sponsorship reasons) was a men's tennis tournament played on outdoor hard courts. It was the second and last edition of the Zhuhai Championships, after the inaugural edition in 2019 following the intervening editions were cancelled due to the COVID-19 pandemic in mainland China. It took place at the Hengqin International Tennis Center in Zhuhai, China, from 20 to 26 September 2023. First-seeded Karen Khachanov won the singles title.

== Finals ==
=== Singles ===
- Karen Khachanov defeated (Japan) Yoshihito Nishioka, 7–6^{(7–2)}, 6–1

=== Doubles ===
- (United Kingdom) Jamie Murray / (New Zealand) Michael Venus defeated (United States) Nathaniel Lammons / (United States) Jackson Withrow, 6–4, 6–4

== Singles main-draw entrants ==
=== Seeds ===
| Country | Player | Rank^{1} | Seed |
|---|---|---|---|
| | Karen Khachanov | 15 | 1 |
| GBR | Cameron Norrie | 17 | 2 |
| GER | Jan-Lennard Struff | 23 | 3 |
| USA | Sebastian Korda | 33 | 4 |
| ARG | Tomás Martín Etcheverry | 35 | 5 |
| USA | Mackenzie McDonald | 39 | 6 |
| GBR | Andy Murray | 41 | 7 |
| JPN | Yoshihito Nishioka | 46 | 8 |

- ^{1} Rankings are as of 18 September 2023

=== Other entrants ===
The following players received wildcards into the singles main draw:

- (China) Li Zhe
- (China) Mo Yecong
- (China) Zhou Yi

The following player received entry using a protected ranking into the singles main draw:

- (Czech Republic) Jiří Veselý

The following players received entry from the qualifying draw:

- (Australia) Alex Bolt
- (Australia) Marc Polmans
- (Australia) Luke Saville
- (Australia) Dane Sweeny

=== Withdrawals ===
- (Croatia) Borna Ćorić → replaced by (China) Shang Juncheng
- (Netherlands) Tallon Griekspoor → replaced by (Argentina) Diego Schwartzman
- (Australia) Jason Kubler → replaced by (Czech Republic) Dalibor Svrčina
- Daniil Medvedev → replaced by (United States) Aleksandar Kovacevic
- Alexander Shevchenko → replaced by (Belgium) Kimmer Coppejans
- (Italy) Lorenzo Sonego → replaced by (Australia) Rinky Hijikata
- (Netherlands) Botic van de Zandschulp → replaced by (South Africa) Lloyd Harris
- (United States) J. J. Wolf → replaced by (France) Térence Atmane

== Doubles main-draw entrants ==
=== Seeds ===
| Country | Player | Country | Player | Rank^{1} | Seed |
|---|---|---|---|---|---|
| BEL | Sander Gillé | BEL | Joran Vliegen | 41 | 1 |
| GBR | Jamie Murray | NZL | Michael Venus | 50 | 2 |
| USA | Nathaniel Lammons | USA | Jackson Withrow | 55 | 3 |
| AUT | Alexander Erler | AUT | Lucas Miedler | 75 | 4 |

- ^{1} Rankings are as of 18 September 2023

=== Other entrants ===
The following pairs received wildcards into the doubles main draw:

- (China) Gao Xin / (China) Li Zhe
- (China) Mo Yecong / (China) Wang Xiaofei

The following pair received entry as alternates:

- (Australia) Marc Polmans / (Australia) Matthew Christopher Romios

=== Withdrawals ===
- Aslan Karatsev / (Australia) Luke Saville → replaced by (Australia) Marc Polmans / (Australia) Matthew Christopher Romios
- (Japan) Ben McLachlan / (Japan) Yoshihito Nishioka → replaced by (Japan) Toshihide Matsui / (Japan) Yoshihito Nishioka
