= 2026 ABN AMRO Open – Doubles =

Doubles
- 2026 ABN AMRO Open

Final
- Champions: (Italy) Simone Bolelli (Italy) Andrea Vavassori
- Runners-up: (Chinese Taipei) Ray Ho (Germany) Hendrik Jebens
- Score: 6–3, 6–4

Details
- Draw: 16 (1Q, 2WC)
- Seeds: 4

Events
Singles	Doubles
- ABN AMRO Open

Defending champions Simone Bolelli and Andrea Vavassori defeated qualifiers Ray Ho and Hendrik Jebens in the final, 6–3, 6–4 to win the doubles tennis title at the 2026 Rotterdam Open.

== Seeds ==
1. (El Salvador) Marcelo Arévalo / (Croatia) Mate Pavić (semifinals)
2. (Germany) Kevin Krawietz / (Germany) Tim Pütz (first round)
3. (Monaco) Hugo Nys / (France) Édouard Roger-Vasselin (first round)
4. (Italy) Simone Bolelli / (Italy) Andrea Vavassori (champions)

== Draw ==
Key

- Q = Qualifier
- WC = Wild card
- LL = Lucky loser
- Alt = Alternate
- ITF = ITF entry
- PR = Protected ranking
- SR = Special ranking
- SE = Special exempt
- JE = Junior exempt
- JR = Junior Accelerator Programme entrant
- CO = College Accelerator Programme entrant
- NG = Next Gen Accelerator Program entrant
- w/o = Walkover
- r = Retired
- d = Defaulted

=== Draw ===
First round
1	(El Salvador) M Arévalo (Croatia) M Pavić	6	6
(Netherlands) T Griekspoor (Netherlands) B van de Zandschulp	4	3
(India) Y Bhambri (Sweden) A Göransson	4	3
WC	(United States) V Kirkov (Netherlands) B Stevens	6	6
3	(Monaco) H Nys (France) É Roger-Vasselin	6^{3}	6	[6]
Q	(Chinese Taipei) R Ho (Germany) H Jebens	7^{7}	2	[10]
WC	(Netherlands) D de Jonge (Netherlands) P de Lange	7	4	[8]
(Mexico) S González (Netherlands) D Pel	5	6	[10]
(Netherlands) S Arends (Monaco) R Arneodo	6^{4}	1
(Belgium) S Gillé (Netherlands) S Verbeek	7^{7}	6
LL	(Denmark) J Ingilsden (Netherlands) M Veldheer	3	6^{8}
4	(Italy) S Bolelli (Italy) A Vavassori	6	7^{10}
(Poland) H Hurkacz; K Khachanov	7^{8}	6^{4}	[14]
(Portugal) F Cabral (Austria) L Miedler	6^{6}	7^{7}	[16]
(Germany) J Schnaitter (Germany) M Wallner	7^{7}	3	[13]
2	(Germany) K Krawietz (Germany) T Pütz	6^{5}	6	[11]

Quarterfinals
1	(El Salvador) M Arévalo (Croatia) M Pavić	6	6^{6}	[10]
WC	(United States) V Kirkov (Netherlands) B Stevens	1	7^{8}	[6]
Q	(Chinese Taipei) R Ho (Germany) H Jebens	6	6
(Mexico) S González (Netherlands) D Pel	2	4
(Belgium) S Gillé (Netherlands) S Verbeek	3	2
4	(Italy) S Bolelli (Italy) A Vavassori	6	6
(Portugal) F Cabral (Austria) L Miedler	5	4
(Germany) J Schnaitter (Germany) M Wallner	7	6

Semifinals
1	(El Salvador) M Arévalo (Croatia) M Pavić	3	6	[9]
Q	(Chinese Taipei) R Ho (Germany) H Jebens	6	1	[11]
4	(Italy) S Bolelli (Italy) A Vavassori	7^{7}	3	[10]
(Germany) J Schnaitter (Germany) M Wallner	6^{5}	6	[7]

Final
Q	(Chinese Taipei) R Ho (Germany) H Jebens	3	4
4	(Italy) S Bolelli (Italy) A Vavassori	6	6

== Qualifying ==
=== Seeds ===
1. (Chinese Taipei) Ray Ho / (Germany) Hendrik Jebens (qualified)
2. (Denmark) Johannes Ingildsen / (Netherlands) Mick Veldheer (qualifying competition, lucky losers)

=== Qualifiers ===
1. (Chinese Taipei) Ray Ho / (Germany) Hendrik Jebens

=== Lucky losers ===
1. (Denmark) Johannes Ingildsen / (Netherlands) Mick Veldheer

=== Qualifying draw ===
First round
1	(Chinese Taipei) Ray Ho (Germany) Hendrik Jebens	6^{2}	6	[10]
(Ukraine) Denys Molchanov (Austria) David Pichler	7^{7}	1	[4]
WC	(Netherlands) Mats Hermans (Netherlands) Mees Röttgering	3	5
2	(Denmark) Johannes Ingildsen (Netherlands) Mick Veldheer	6	7

Qualifying competition
1	(Chinese Taipei) Ray Ho (Germany) Hendrik Jebens	6	6^{5}	[11]
2	(Denmark) Johannes Ingildsen (Netherlands) Mick Veldheer	4	7^{7}	[9]
