= 2025 ABN AMRO Open – Doubles =

Doubles
- 2025 ABN AMRO Open

Final
- Champions: (Italy) Simone Bolelli (Italy) Andrea Vavassori
- Runners-up: (Belgium) Sander Gillé (Poland) Jan Zieliński
- Score: 6–2, 4–6, [10–6]

Details
- Draw: 16 (1Q, 2WC)
- Seeds: 4

Events
| Singles | Doubles |
| ← 2024 · | ABN AMRO Open | · 2026 → |

Simone Bolelli and Andrea Vavassori defeated Sander Gillé and Jan Zieliński in the final, 6–2, 4–6, [10–6] to win the men's doubles title at the 2025 Rotterdam Open.

Wesley Koolhof and Nikola Mektić were the reigning champions, but Koolhof retired from professional tennis at the end of 2024. Mektić partnered Michael Venus, but they lost in the quarterfinals to Sander Gillé and Jan Zieliński.

== Seeds ==
1. (El Salvador) Marcelo Arévalo / (Croatia) Mate Pavić (semifinals)
2. (Germany) Kevin Krawietz / (Germany) Tim Pütz (quarterfinals)
3. (Italy) Simone Bolelli / (Italy) Andrea Vavassori
4. (Croatia) Nikola Mektić / (New Zealand) Michael Venus (quarterfinals)

== Draw ==
=== Key ===
- Q = Qualifier
- WC = Wild card
- LL = Lucky loser
- Alt = Alternate
- SE = Special exempt
- PR = Protected ranking
- ITF = ITF entry
- JE = Junior exempt
- w/o = Walkover
- r = Retired
- d = Defaulted
- SR = Special ranking

=== Draw ===
First round
1 | (El Salvador) M Arévalo (Croatia) M Pavić | 6 | 6
LL | (Czech Republic) P Nouza (Czech Republic) P Rikl | 3 | 2
(Monaco) H Nys (France) É Roger-Vasselin | 7^{7} | 7^{7}
(France) S Doumbia (France) F Reboul | 6^{5} | 6^{2}
4 | (Croatia) N Mektić (New Zealand) M Venus | 6 | 6
(Australia) M Ebden (Belgium) J Vliegen | 4 | 4
(Croatia) I Dodig (China) Z Zhang | 5 | 5
(Belgium) S Gillé (Poland) J Zieliński | 7 | 7
(Czech Republic) A Pavlásek (Netherlands) J-J Rojer | 3 | 6 | [8]
Q | (Germany) J Schnaitter (Germany) M Wallner | 6 | 4 | [10]
(Poland) H Hurkacz (Czech Republic) J Menšík | 5 | 6^{1}
3 | (Italy) S Bolelli (Italy) A Vavassori | 7 | 7^{7}
WC | (Netherlands) R Haase (Netherlands) S Verbeek | 4 | 4
(United Kingdom) J Cash (United Kingdom) L Glasspool | 6 | 6
WC | (Netherlands) T Griekspoor (Netherlands) B van de Zandschulp | 3 | 6^{5}
2 | (Germany) K Krawietz (Germany) T Pütz | 6 | 7^{7}

Quarterfinals
1 | (El Salvador) M Arévalo (Croatia) M Pavić | 6 | 7^{7}
(Monaco) H Nys (France) É Roger-Vasselin | 4 | 6^{4}
4 | (Croatia) N Mektić (New Zealand) M Venus | 6^{5} | 6^{3}
(Belgium) S Gillé (Poland) J Zieliński | 7^{7} | 7^{7}
Q | (Germany) J Schnaitter (Germany) M Wallner | 6^{3} | 3
3 | (Italy) S Bolelli (Italy) A Vavassori | 7^{7} | 6
(United Kingdom) J Cash (United Kingdom) L Glasspool | 6 | 6
2 | (Germany) K Krawietz (Germany) T Pütz | 3 | 4

Semifinals
1 | (El Salvador) M Arévalo (Croatia) M Pavić | 6^{7} | 6^{6}
(Belgium) S Gillé (Poland) J Zieliński | 7^{9} | 7^{8}
3 | (Italy) S Bolelli (Italy) A Vavassori | 7^{7} | 7^{7}
(United Kingdom) J Cash (United Kingdom) L Glasspool | 6^{1} | 6^{3}

Final
(Belgium) S Gillé (Poland) J Zieliński | 2 | 6 | 6
3 | (Italy) S Bolelli (Italy) A Vavassori | 6 | 4 | [10]

== Qualifying ==
=== Seeds ===
1. (Germany) Hendrik Jebens / (Germany) Andreas Mies (first round)
2. (Czech Republic) Petr Nouza / (Czech Republic) Patrik Rikl (qualifying competition, lucky losers)

=== Qualifiers ===
1. (Germany) Jakob Schnaitter / (Germany) Mark Wallner

=== Lucky losers ===
1. (Czech Republic) Petr Nouza / (Czech Republic) Patrik Rikl

=== Qualifying draw ===
First round
1 | (Germany) Hendrik Jebens (Germany) Andreas Mies | 4 | 6 | [3]
(Germany) Jakob Schnaitter (Germany) Mark Wallner | 6 | 3 | [10]
WC | (Netherlands) Matwé Middelkoop (Netherlands) Mick Veldheer | 6 | 6^{5} | [7]
2 | (Czech Republic) Petr Nouza (Czech Republic) Patrik Rikl | 4 | 7^{7} | [10]

Qualifying competition
(Germany) Jakob Schnaitter (Germany) Mark Wallner | 6 | 7^{7}
2 | (Czech Republic) Petr Nouza (Czech Republic) Patrik Rikl | 2 | 6^{0}
