= 2019 Zhuhai Championships – Doubles =

Doubles
- 2019 Zhuhai Championships

Final
- Champions: (Belgium) Sander Gillé (Belgium) Joran Vliegen
- Runners-up: (Brazil) Marcelo Demoliner (Netherlands) Matwé Middelkoop
- Score: 7–6^{(7–2)}, 7–6^{(7–4)}

Events
Singles	Doubles
- Zhuhai Championships

This was the first edition of the tournament.

Sander Gillé and Joran Vliegen won the title, defeating Marcelo Demoliner and Matwé Middelkoop in the final, 7–6^{(7–2)}, 7–6^{(7–4)}.

== Seeds ==
1. (Netherlands) Jean-Julien Rojer / (Romania) Horia Tecău (quarterfinals)
2. (United Kingdom) Luke Bambridge / (Japan) Ben McLachlan (quarterfinals)
3. (New Zealand) Marcus Daniell / (Austria) Philipp Oswald (quarterfinals)
4. (Belgium) Sander Gillé / (Belgium) Joran Vliegen (champions)

== Draw ==
Key

- Q = Qualifier
- WC = Wild card
- LL = Lucky loser
- Alt = Alternate
- ITF = ITF entry
- PR = Protected ranking
- SR = Special ranking
- SE = Special exempt
- JE = Junior exempt
- JR = Junior Accelerator Programme entrant
- CO = College Accelerator Programme entrant
- NG = Next Gen Accelerator Program entrant
- w/o = Walkover
- r = Retired
- d = Defaulted

=== Draw ===
First round
1	(Netherlands) J-J Rojer (Romania) H Tecău	6	3	[10]
(Australia) N Kyrgios (Australia) M Reid	3	6	[7]
(Ukraine) D Molchanov (Pakistan) A-u-H Qureshi	5	4
(Germany) D Koepfer (South Korea) S-w Kwon	7	6
4	(Belgium) S Gillé (Belgium) J Vliegen	4	6	[10]
(Serbia) M Kecmanović (India) J Nedunchezhiyan	6	3	[6]
WC	(China) M Gong (China) Ze Zhang	5	7	[11]
(Italy) T Fabbiano (Italy) A Seppi	7	5	[9]
(Brazil) M Demoliner (Netherlands) M Middelkoop	6	7
(United Kingdom) C Norrie (Spain) A Ramos Viñolas	3	5
WC	(China) D Wu (China) Zh Zhang	2	1
3	(New Zealand) M Daniell (Austria) P Oswald	6	6
(Italy) M Cecchinato (Norway) C Ruud	6^{3}	6^{4}
(Portugal) G Oliveira (Belarus) A Vasilevski	7^{7}	7^{7}
(India) D Sharan (New Zealand) A Sitak	6^{2}	4
2	(United Kingdom) L Bambridge (Japan) B McLachlan	7^{7}	6

Quarterfinals
1	(Netherlands) J-J Rojer (Romania) H Tecău	4	6	[5]
(Germany) D Koepfer (South Korea) S-w Kwon	6	1	[10]
4	(Belgium) S Gillé (Belgium) J Vliegen	6	6
WC	(China) M Gong (China) Ze Zhang	3	4
(Brazil) M Demoliner (Netherlands) M Middelkoop	6^{2}	7	[10]
3	(New Zealand) M Daniell (Austria) P Oswald	7^{7}	5	[7]
(Portugal) G Oliveira (Belarus) A Vasilevski	6^{7}	6	[10]
2	(United Kingdom) L Bambridge (Japan) B McLachlan	7^{9}	3	[8]

Semifinals
(Germany) D Koepfer (South Korea) S-w Kwon	4	3
4	(Belgium) S Gillé (Belgium) J Vliegen	6	6
(Brazil) M Demoliner (Netherlands) M Middelkoop	7^{7}	6
(Portugal) G Oliveira (Belarus) A Vasilevski	6^{4}	3

Final
4	(Belgium) S Gillé (Belgium) J Vliegen	7^{7}	7^{7}
(Brazil) M Demoliner (Netherlands) M Middelkoop	6^{2}	6^{4}
