= 2019 Zhuhai Championships =

Male tennis tournament

- Date: September 23–29
- Edition: 1st
- Category: ATP Tour 250 series
- Draw: 28S / 16D
- Surface: Hard / outdoor
- Location: Zhuhai, China
- Venue: Hengqin International Tennis Center

Champions

Singles
- (Australia) Alex de Minaur

Doubles
- (Belgium) Sander Gillé / (Belgium) Joran Vliegen
- Zhuhai Championships

The 2019 Zhuhai Championships was a men's tennis tournament played on outdoor hard courts. It was the inaugural edition of the Zhuhai Championships (replacing the Shenzhen Open), and part of the ATP Tour 250 series of the 2019 ATP Tour. It took place at the Hengqin International Tennis Center in Zhuhai, China, from September 23 until September 29, 2019. Seventh-seeded Alex de Minaur won the singles title.

== Finals ==
=== Singles ===
- (Australia) Alex de Minaur defeated (France) Adrian Mannarino, 7–6^{(7–4)}, 6–4

=== Doubles ===
- (Belgium) Sander Gillé / (Belgium) Joran Vliegen defeated (Brazil) Marcelo Demoliner / (Netherlands) Matwé Middelkoop, 7–6^{(7–2)}, 7–6^{(7–4)}

== Singles main-draw entrants ==
=== Seeds ===
Country	Player	Rank^{1}	Seed
GRE	Stefanos Tsitsipas	7	1
ESP	Roberto Bautista Agut	10	2
FRA	Gaël Monfils	12	3
CRO	Borna Ćorić	15	4
FRA	Lucas Pouille	26	5
AUS	Nick Kyrgios	27	6
AUS	Alex de Minaur	31	7
ESP	Albert Ramos Viñolas	46	8

- ^{1} Rankings are as of September 16, 2019

=== Other entrants ===
The following players received wildcards into the singles main draw:

- (China) Wu Di
- (China) Zhang Ze
- (China) Zhang Zhizhen

The following player received entry using a protected ranking into the singles main draw:

- (United Kingdom) Andy Murray

The following players received entry from the qualifying draw:

- (Bosnia and Herzegovina) Damir Džumhur
- (Japan) Tatsuma Ito
- (Germany) Dominik Koepfer
- (South Korea) Kwon Soon-woo

=== Withdrawals ===
- (Czech Republic) Tomáš Berdych → replaced by (United States) Tennys Sandgren
- (France) Pierre-Hugues Herbert → replaced by (United States) Steve Johnson
- (Russia) Andrey Rublev → replaced by (Germany) Peter Gojowczyk

=== Retirements ===
- (Norway) Casper Ruud (illness)
- (Greece) Stefanos Tsitsipas (breathing problem)

== Doubles main-draw entrants ==
=== Seeds ===
Country	Player	Country	Player	Rank^{1}	Seed
NED	Jean-Julien Rojer	ROU	Horia Tecău	40	1
GBR	Luke Bambridge	JPN	Ben McLachlan	85	2
NZL	Marcus Daniell	AUT	Philipp Oswald	90	3
BEL	Sander Gillé	BEL	Joran Vliegen	94	4

- ^{1} Rankings are as of September 16, 2019

=== Other entrants ===
The following pairs received wildcards into the doubles main draw:

- (China) Gong Maoxin / (China) Zhang Ze
- (China) Wu Di / (China) Zhang Zhizhen
