= 2026 ABN AMRO Open =

- Date: 9–15 February
- Edition: 53rd
- Category: ATP Tour 500
- Draw: 32S / 16D
- Surface: Hard (indoor)
- Location: Rotterdam, Netherlands
- Venue: Rotterdam Ahoy

Champions

Singles
- (Australia) Alex de Minaur

Doubles
- (Italy) Simone Bolelli / (Italy) Andrea Vavassori
- Rotterdam Open

The 2026 ABN AMRO Open was a men's tennis tournament played on indoor hard courts. It took place at the Rotterdam Ahoy in the Dutch city of Rotterdam, between 9 and 15 February 2026. It was the 53rd edition of the Rotterdam Open, and part of the ATP Tour 500 series on the 2026 ATP Tour. The tournament also includes a wheelchair tennis singles and doubles draw for both men and women.

== Champions ==
=== Singles ===
- (Australia) Alex de Minaur def. (Canada) Félix Auger-Aliassime, 6–3, 6–2

=== Doubles ===
- (Italy) Simone Bolelli / (Italy) Andrea Vavassori def. (Chinese Taipei) Ray Ho / (Germany) Hendrik Jebens, 6–3, 6–4

== Point distribution and prize money ==
=== Point distribution ===
Event	W	F	SF	QF	Round of 16	Round of 32	Q	Q2	Q1
Singles	500	330	200	100	50	0	25	13	0
Doubles	500	300	180	90	0	—N/a	45	25	0

=== Prize money ===
Event	W	F	SF	QF	Round of 16	Round of 32	Q2	Q1
Singles	€460,555	€247,800	€132,060	€67,470	€36,015	€19,205	€9,845	€5,525
Doubles*	€151,280	€80,680	€40,820	€20,420	€10,560	—N/a	—N/a	—N/a
Doubles prize money per team

== Singles main-draw entrants ==
^{‡}	Champion
^{†}	Runner-up

=== Seeds ===
Country	Player	Ranking^{1}	Seed
AUS	Alex de Minaur^{‡}	6	1
CAN	Félix Auger-Aliassime^{†}	8	2
KAZ	Alexander Bublik	10	3
	Daniil Medvedev	11	4
	Karen Khachanov	18	5
GBR	Cameron Norrie	26	6
NED	Tallon Griekspoor	29	7
FRA	Arthur Rinderknech	31	8

- ^{1} Rankings are as of 2 February 2026.

=== Other entrants ===
The following players received wildcards into the main draw:

- (Norway) Nicolai Budkov Kjær
- (Netherlands) Guy den Ouden
- (Switzerland) Stan Wawrinka

The following players received entry from the qualifying draw:

- (France) Hugo Grenier
- (Australia) Christopher O'Connell
- (France) Luka Pavlovic
- (Netherlands) Mees Röttgering

The following players received entry as lucky losers:

- (Netherlands) Thijs Boogaard
- (Serbia) Hamad Medjedovic

=== Withdrawals ===
- (Spain) Carlos Alcaraz → replaced by (France) Giovanni Mpetshi Perricard
- (United Kingdom) Jack Draper → replaced by (Spain) Roberto Bautista Agut
- (Czech Republic) Tomáš Macháč → replaced by (Netherlands) Botic van de Zandschulp
- (Poland) Kamil Majchrzak → replaced by (Germany) Jan-Lennard Struff
- (Hungary) Fábián Marozsán → replaced by (Serbia) Hamad Medjedovic (LL)
- (Australia) Aleksandar Vukic → replaced by (Netherlands) Thijs Boogaard (LL)
- (Germany) Alexander Zverev → replaced by (Netherlands) Jesper de Jong

== Doubles main-draw entrants ==
=== Seeds ===
Country	Player	Country	Player	Rank^{1}	Seed
ESA	Marcelo Arévalo	CRO	Mate Pavić	12	1
GER	Kevin Krawietz	GER	Tim Pütz	24	2
MON	Hugo Nys	FRA	Édouard Roger-Vasselin	33	3
ITA	Simone Bolelli	ITA	Andrea Vavassori	37	4

- ^{1} Rankings as of 2 February 2026.

=== Other entrants ===
The following pairs received wildcards into the doubles main draw:

- (Netherlands) Daniel de Jonge / (Netherlands) Pieter de Lange
- (United States) Vasil Kirkov / (Netherlands) Bart Stevens

The following pair received entry from the qualifying draw:

- (Chinese Taipei) Ray Ho / (Germany) Hendrik Jebens

The following pair received entry as lucky losers:

- (Denmark) Johannes Ingildsen / (Netherlands) Mick Veldheer

=== Withdrawals ===
- (Kazakhstan) Alexander Bublik / (France) Valentin Royer → replaced by (Denmark) Johannes Ingildsen / (Netherlands) Mick Veldheer
