= 2019 Zhuhai Championships – Singles =

Singles
- 2019 Zhuhai Championships

Final
- Champion: (Australia) Alex de Minaur
- Runner-up: (France) Adrian Mannarino
- Score: 7–6^{(7–4)}, 6–4

Details
- Draw: 28 (4 Q / 3 WC )
- Seeds: 8

Events
Singles	Doubles
- Zhuhai Championships

This was the first edition of the tournament.

Alex de Minaur won the title, defeating Adrian Mannarino in the final, 7–6^{(7–4)}, 6–4.

== Seeds ==
The top four seeds received a bye into the second round.

1. (Greece) Stefanos Tsitsipas (second round, retired)
2. (Spain) Roberto Bautista Agut (semifinals)
3. (France) Gaël Monfils (quarterfinals)
4. (Croatia) Borna Ćorić (quarterfinals)
5. (France) Lucas Pouille (first round)
6. (Australia) Nick Kyrgios (first round)
7. (Australia) Alex de Minaur (champion)
8. (Spain) Albert Ramos Viñolas (semifinals)

== Draw ==
Key

- Q = Qualifier
- WC = Wild card
- LL = Lucky loser
- Alt = Alternate
- ITF = ITF entry
- PR = Protected ranking
- SR = Special ranking
- SE = Special exempt
- JE = Junior exempt
- JR = Junior Accelerator Programme entrant
- CO = College Accelerator Programme entrant
- NG = Next Gen Accelerator Program entrant
- w/o = Walkover
- r = Retired
- d = Defaulted

=== Finals ===
Semifinals
(France) Adrian Mannarino	6	4	6
8	(Spain) Albert Ramos Viñolas	0	6	1
7	(Australia) Alex de Minaur	6	6
2	(Spain) Roberto Bautista Agut	2	2

Final
(France) Adrian Mannarino	6^{4}	4
7	(Australia) Alex de Minaur	7^{7}	6

=== Top half ===
First round
(France) A Mannarino	7^{8}	7
WC	(China) Ze Zhang	6^{6}	5
Q	(Bosnia and Herzegovina) D Džumhur	5	6	6
(Italy) M Cecchinato	7	4	2
Q	(South Korea) S-w Kwon	7^{7}	6
5	(France) L Pouille	6^{4}	2
(Germany) P Gojowczyk	1	4
(United Kingdom) C Norrie	6	6
(Norway) C Ruud	2	0^{r}
(Serbia) M Kecmanović	6	0
(Japan) Y Nishioka	2	1
8	(Spain) A Ramos Viñolas	6	6

Second round
1	(Greece) S Tsitsipas	6	5	0^{r}
(France) A Mannarino	3	7	0
Q	(Bosnia and Herzegovina) D Džumhur	7^{7}	6
Q	(South Korea) S-w Kwon	6^{3}	2
3	(France) G Monfils	5	6	6
(United Kingdom) C Norrie	7	3	4
(Serbia) M Kecmanović	6^{2}	3
8	(Spain) A Ramos Viñolas	7^{7}	6

Quarterfinals
(France) A Mannarino	6	6
Q	(Bosnia and Herzegovina) D Džumhur	1	4
3	(France) G Monfils	5	4
8	(Spain) A Ramos Viñolas	7	6

Semifinals
(France) A Mannarino	6	4	6
8	(Spain) A Ramos Viñolas	0	6	1

=== Bottom half ===
First round
7	(Australia) A de Minaur	6	6
(Australia) J Millman	1	3
(United States) T Sandgren	3	7^{8}	1
PR	(United Kingdom) A Murray	6	6^{6}	6
Q	(Japan) T Ito	6	3	5
WC	(China) D Wu	3	6	7
6	(Australia) N Kyrgios	6^{5}	1
(Italy) A Seppi	7^{7}	6
Q	(Germany) D Koepfer	5	2
WC	(China) Zh Zhang	7	6
(United States) S Johnson	6	2	1
(Spain) P Andújar	2	6	6

Second round
7	(Australia) A de Minaur	4	6	6
PR	(United Kingdom) A Murray	6	2	4
WC	(China) D Wu	3	3
4	(Croatia) B Ćorić	6	6
(Italy) A Seppi	7^{7}	4	7^{10}
WC	(China) Zh Zhang	6^{4}	6	6^{8}
(Spain) P Andújar	5	5
2	(Spain) R Bautista Agut	7	7

Quarterfinals
7	(Australia) A de Minaur	6	4	6
4	(Croatia) B Ćorić	2	6	4
(Italy) A Seppi	2	2
2	(Spain) R Bautista Agut	6	6

Semifinals
7	(Australia) A de Minaur	6	6
2	(Spain) R Bautista Agut	2	2

== Qualifying ==
=== Seeds ===
1. (South Korea) Kwon Soon-woo (qualified)
2. (Germany) Dominik Koepfer (qualified)
3. (Bosnia and Herzegovina) Damir Džumhur (qualified)
4. (Italy) Thomas Fabbiano (first round)
5. (Canada) Brayden Schnur (qualifying competition)
6. (Switzerland) Henri Laaksonen (qualifying competition)
7. (Japan) Yūichi Sugita (qualifying competition)
8. (Czech Republic) Jiří Veselý (qualifying competition, retired)

=== Qualifiers ===
1. (South Korea) Kwon Soon-woo
2. (Germany) Dominik Koepfer
3. (Bosnia and Herzegovina) Damir Džumhur
4. (Japan) Tatsuma Ito

=== Qualifying draw ===
==== First qualifier ====
First round
1	(South Korea) Kwon Soon-woo	6	6
Alt	(Netherlands) Miliaan Niesten	3	2
WC	(China) Hua Runhao	3	3
6	(Switzerland) Henri Laaksonen	6	6

Qualifying competition
1	(South Korea) Kwon Soon-woo	6	5	6
6	(Switzerland) Henri Laaksonen	2	7	4

==== Second qualifier ====
First round
2	(Germany) Dominik Koepfer	6	7^{7}
Alt	(China) He Yecong	4	6^{3}
WC	(China) Zhao Zhao	0	0
7	(Japan) Yūichi Sugita	6	6

Qualifying competition
2	(Germany) Dominik Koepfer	7^{7}	6
7	(Japan) Yūichi Sugita	6^{5}	3

==== Third qualifier ====
First round
3	(Bosnia and Herzegovina) Damir Džumhur	6	2	6
(Australia) Alex Bolt	4	6	4
(Portugal) Gonçalo Oliveira	5	3
5	(Canada) Brayden Schnur	7	6

Qualifying competition
3	(Bosnia and Herzegovina) Damir Džumhur	6	6
5	(Canada) Brayden Schnur	2	2

==== Fourth qualifier ====
First round
4	(Italy) Thomas Fabbiano	4	3
(Japan) Tatsuma Ito	6	6
(Japan) Yasutaka Uchiyama	7^{7}	6^{2}	6^{5}
8	(Czech Republic) Jiří Veselý	6^{5}	7^{7}	7^{7}

Qualifying competition
(Japan) Tatsuma Ito	6	0
8	(Czech Republic) Jiří Veselý	4	0^{r}
