= 2025 ABN AMRO Open – Singles =

Singles
- 2025 ABN AMRO Open

Final
- Champion: (Spain) Carlos Alcaraz
- Runner-up: (Australia) Alex de Minaur
- Score: 6–4, 3–6, 6–2

Details
- Draw: 32 (4 Q / 3 WC )
- Seeds: 8

Events
Singles	Doubles
- Rotterdam Open

Carlos Alcaraz defeated Alex de Minaur in the final, 6–4, 3–6, 6–2 to win the singles tennis title at the 2025 Rotterdam Open. It was his 17th ATP Tour title, and first on indoor hardcourt.

Jannik Sinner was the reigning champion, but withdrew before the tournament began.

== Seeds ==
1. (Spain) Carlos Alcaraz (champion)
2. Daniil Medvedev (second round)
3. (Australia) Alex de Minaur (final)
4. Andrey Rublev (quarterfinals)
5. (Denmark) Holger Rune (second round)
6. (Greece) Stefanos Tsitsipas (quarterfinals)
7. (France) Arthur Fils (second round)
8. (Poland) Hubert Hurkacz (semifinals)

== Draw ==
Key

- Q = Qualifier
- WC = Wild card
- LL = Lucky loser
- Alt = Alternate
- ITF = ITF entry
- PR = Protected ranking
- SR = Special ranking
- SE = Special exempt
- JE = Junior exempt
- JR = Junior Accelerator Programme entrant
- CO = College Accelerator Programme entrant
- NG = Next Gen Accelerator Program entrant
- w/o = Walkover
- r = Retired
- d = Defaulted

=== Finals ===
Semifinals
1	(Spain) Carlos Alcaraz	6	6^{5}	6
8	(Poland) Hubert Hurkacz	4	7^{7}	3
3	(Australia) Alex de Minaur	6	6
Q	(Italy) Mattia Bellucci	1	2

Final
1	(Spain) Carlos Alcaraz	6	3	6
3	(Australia) Alex de Minaur	4	6	2

=== Top half ===
First round
1	(Spain) C Alcaraz	7^{7}	3	6
WC	(Netherlands) B van de Zandschulp	6^{3}	6	1
Q	(Italy) A Vavassori	6^{3}	6	0
(Canada) F Auger-Aliassime	7^{7}	4	0^{r}
(Spain) P Martínez	6	6
(Spain) R Bautista Agut	3	2
(Italy) L Sonego	6^{4}	4
5	(Denmark) H Rune	7^{7}	6
4	A Rublev	6	6
(China) Z Zhang	3	4
(Germany) J-L Struff	3	6	6^{3}
(Hungary) F Marozsán	6	4	7^{7}
(Czech Republic) J Lehečka	7	6
(Australia) A Popyrin	5	2
(Italy) F Cobolli	3	2
8	(Poland) H Hurkacz	6	6

Second round
1	(Spain) C Alcaraz	6	6
Q	(Italy) A Vavassori	2	1
(Spain) P Martínez	6	6
5	(Denmark) H Rune	4	1
4	A Rublev	7^{7}	7^{9}
(Hungary) F Marozsán	6^{2}	6^{7}
(Czech Republic) J Lehečka	5	0^{r}
8	(Poland) H Hurkacz	7	2

Quarterfinals
1	(Spain) C Alcaraz	6	6
(Spain) P Martínez	2	1
4	A Rublev	7^{7}	3	4
8	(Poland) H Hurkacz	6^{5}	6	6

Semifinals
1	(Spain) C Alcaraz	6	6^{5}	6
8	(Poland) H Hurkacz	4	7^{7}	3

=== Bottom half ===
First round
7	(France) A Fils	6^{4}	6	6
Q	(France) C Lestienne	7^{7}	2	1
SE	(United States) A Kovacevic	6	4	3
LL	(Germany) D Altmaier	1	6	6
(Kazakhstan) A Bublik	4	4
(Czech Republic) J Menšík	6	6
(Belgium) D Goffin	2	4
3	(Australia) A de Minaur	6	6
6/WC	(Greece) S Tsitsipas	6	7
Q	(France) H Mayot	1	5
(Italy) M Berrettini	3	7^{7}	6^{4}
(Netherlands) T Griekspoor	6	6^{2}	7^{7}
Q	(Italy) M Bellucci	6	6
WC	(Netherlands) M Röttgering	3	2
WC	(Switzerland) S Wawrinka	7^{10}	4	1
2	D Medvedev	6^{8}	6	6

Second round
7	(France) A Fils	4	6	5
LL	(Germany) D Altmaier	6	3	7
(Czech Republic) J Menšík	4	4
3	(Australia) A de Minaur	6	6
6/WC	(Greece) S Tsitsipas	6^{5}	7^{8}	7
(Netherlands) T Griekspoor	7^{7}	6^{6}	5
Q	(Italy) M Bellucci	6	6^{6}	6
2	D Medvedev	3	7^{8}	3

Quarterfinals
LL	(Germany) D Altmaier	1	4
3	(Australia) A de Minaur	6	6
6/WC	(Greece) S Tsitsipas	4	2
Q	(Italy) M Bellucci	6	6

Semifinals
3	(Australia) A de Minaur	6	6
Q	(Italy) M Bellucci	1	2

== Qualifying ==
=== Seeds ===
1. (France) Quentin Halys (withdrew)
2. (Germany) Daniel Altmaier (qualifying competition, lucky loser)
3. (Italy) Mattia Bellucci (qualified)
4. (Kazakhstan) Mikhail Kukushkin (qualifying competition)
5. (France) Harold Mayot (qualified)
6. (United Kingdom) Dan Evans (first round)
7. (France) Constant Lestienne (qualified)
8. (Netherlands) Gijs Brouwer (qualifying competition)

=== Qualifiers ===
1. (Italy) Andrea Vavassori
2. (France) Constant Lestienne
3. (Italy) Mattia Bellucci
4. (France) Harold Mayot

=== Lucky loser ===
1. (Germany) Daniel Altmaier

=== Qualifying draw ===
==== First qualifier ====
First round
Alt	(Netherlands) Niels Visker	6^{2}	2
(Italy) Andrea Vavassori	7^{7}	6
(France) Geoffrey Blancaneaux	6	6
6	(United Kingdom) Dan Evans	4	3

Qualifying competition
(Italy) Andrea Vavassori	6	6
(France) Geoffrey Blancaneaux	3	4

==== Second qualifier ====
First round
2	(Germany) Daniel Altmaier	6	6
Alt	(Spain) Carlos Sánchez Jover	3	2
Alt	(Netherlands) Ryan Nijboer	6^{3}	6^{6}
7	(France) Constant Lestienne	7^{7}	7^{8}

Qualifying competition
2	(Germany) Daniel Altmaier	6^{3}	4
7	(France) Constant Lestienne	7^{7}	6

==== Third qualifier ====
First round
3	(Italy) Mattia Bellucci	6	6
WC	(Netherlands) Thijs Boogaard	3	1
Alt	(Netherlands) Max Houkes	3	4
8/WC	(Netherlands) Gijs Brouwer	6	6

Qualifying competition
3	(Italy) Mattia Bellucci	6	6
8/WC	(Netherlands) Gijs Brouwer	1	1

==== Fourth qualifier ====
First round
4	(Kazakhstan) Mikhail Kukushkin	6	6
WC	(Netherlands) Jelle Sels	4	1
Alt	(Czech Republic) Michael Vrbenský	2	2
5	(France) Harold Mayot	6	6

Qualifying competition
4	(Kazakhstan) Mikhail Kukushkin	1	6^{4}
5	(France) Harold Mayot	6	7^{7}
