= 2026 ABN AMRO Open – Singles =

Singles
- 2026 ABN AMRO Open

Final
- Champion: (Australia) Alex de Minaur
- Runner-up: (Canada) Félix Auger-Aliassime
- Score: 6–3, 6–2

Details
- Draw: 32 (4 Q / 3 WC )
- Seeds: 8

Events
Singles	Doubles
- Rotterdam Open

Alex de Minaur defeated Félix Auger-Aliassime in the final, 6–3, 6–2 to win the singles tennis title at the 2026 Rotterdam Open. It was his first title at the event, following runner-up finishes the previous two years, and 11th ATP Tour title overall. De Minaur became the first player in tournament history to reach three consecutive finals.

Carlos Alcaraz was the reigning champion, but withdrew before the tournament began.

The first-round match between Stan Wawrinka (40 years, 320 days) and Thijs Boogaard (17 years, 221 days) marked the largest age gap between two players in an ATP Tour singles main-draw match since the 2011 Vienna Open first-round match between Thomas Muster and Dominic Thiem, and the second-largest gap overall since the establishment of the ATP Tour in 1990.

== Seeds ==
1. (Australia) Alex de Minaur (champion)
2. (Canada) Félix Auger-Aliassime (final)
3. (Kazakhstan) Alexander Bublik (semifinals)
4. Daniil Medvedev (first round)
5. Karen Khachanov (second round)
6. (United Kingdom) Cameron Norrie (second round)
7. (Netherlands) Tallon Griekspoor (quarterfinals)
8. (France) Arthur Rinderknech (first round)

== Draw ==
Key

- Q = Qualifier
- WC = Wild card
- LL = Lucky loser
- Alt = Alternate
- ITF = ITF entry
- PR = Protected ranking
- SR = Special ranking
- SE = Special exempt
- JE = Junior exempt
- JR = Junior Accelerator Programme entrant
- CO = College Accelerator Programme entrant
- NG = Next Gen Accelerator Program entrant
- w/o = Walkover
- r = Retired
- d = Defaulted

=== Finals ===
Semifinals
1	(Australia) Alex de Minaur	6	6
(France) Ugo Humbert	4	3
3	(Kazakhstan) Alexander Bublik	1	2
2	(Canada) Félix Auger-Aliassime	6	6

Final
1	(Australia) Alex de Minaur	6	6
2	(Canada) Félix Auger-Aliassime	3	2

=== Top half ===
First round
1	(Australia) A de Minaur	7^{7}	6
(France) A Fils	6^{3}	2
LL	(Netherlands) T Boogaard	3	4
WC	(Switzerland) S Wawrinka	6	6
Q	(France) L Pavlovic	6^{5}	3
(Netherlands) B van de Zandschulp	7^{7}	6
(Greece) S Tsitsipas	7	6
8	(France) A Rinderknech	5	3
4	D Medvedev	6^{4}	6	3
(France) U Humbert	7^{7}	3	6
WC	(Netherlands) G den Ouden	7^{7}	6
(Hungary) M Fucsovics	6^{5}	1
(France) V Royer	4	6	6^{4}
Q	(Australia) C O'Connell	6	4	7^{7}
(Spain) R Bautista Agut	6^{3}	1
6	(United Kingdom) C Norrie	7^{7}	6

Second round
1	(Australia) A de Minaur	6	6
WC	(Switzerland) S Wawrinka	4	2
(Netherlands) B van de Zandschulp	6	7^{7}
(Greece) S Tsitsipas	4	6^{4}
(France) U Humbert	6	6
WC	(Netherlands) G den Ouden	4	3
Q	(Australia) C O'Connell	7^{11}	6
6	(United Kingdom) C Norrie	6^{9}	4

Quarterfinals
1	(Australia) A de Minaur	3	7^{7}	7
(Netherlands) B van de Zandschulp	6	6^{4}	5
(France) U Humbert	6	6
Q	(Australia) C O'Connell	4	1

Semifinals
1	(Australia) A de Minaur	6	6
(France) U Humbert	4	3

=== Bottom half ===
First round
5	K Khachanov	3	6	7
(Netherlands) J de Jong	6	4	5
WC	(Norway) N Budkov Kjær	1	3
(Spain) J Munar	6	6
Q	(France) H Grenier	0	4
(Germany) J-L Struff	6	6
(Poland) H Hurkacz	7^{7}	6^{1}	5
3	(Kazakhstan) A Bublik	6^{2}	7^{7}	7
7	(Netherlands) T Griekspoor	6	6
(France) G Mpetshi Perricard	4	4
(France) Q Halys	3	6	6
Q	(Netherlands) M Röttgering	6	1	1
(Belgium) Z Bergs	6^{5}	6^{5}
LL	(Serbia) H Medjedovic	7^{7}	7^{7}
(Australia) A Popyrin	5	3
2	(Canada) F Auger-Aliassime	7	6

Second round
5	K Khachanov	6^{8}	6	3
(Spain) J Munar	7^{10}	3	6
(Germany) J-L Struff	6^{2}	6	3
3	(Kazakhstan) A Bublik	7^{7}	4	6
7	(Netherlands) T Griekspoor	7	7^{13}
(France) Q Halys	5	6^{11}
LL	(Serbia) H Medjedovic	4	4
2	(Canada) F Auger-Aliassime	6	6

Quarterfinals
(Spain) J Munar	4	7^{7}	6^{3}
3	(Kazakhstan) A Bublik	6	6^{4}	7^{7}
7	(Netherlands) T Griekspoor	6^{2}	2
2	(Canada) F Auger-Aliassime	7^{7}	6

Semifinals
3	(Kazakhstan) A Bublik	1	2
2	(Canada) F Auger-Aliassime	6	6

== Qualifying ==
=== Seeds ===
1. (Serbia) Hamad Medjedovic (qualifying competition, lucky loser)
2. (Spain) Roberto Bautista Agut (moved to main draw)
3. (France) Hugo Gaston (qualifying competition)
4. (Spain) Pablo Carreño Busta (first round)
5. (France) Kyrian Jacquet (first round)
6. (Australia) Christopher O'Connell (qualified)
7. (United Kingdom) Jan Choinski (first round)
8. (United Kingdom) Billy Harris (first round)

=== Qualifiers ===
1. (France) Luka Pavlovic
2. (France) Hugo Grenier
3. (Australia) Christopher O'Connell
4. (Netherlands) Mees Röttgering

=== Lucky losers ===
1. (Serbia) Hamad Medjedovic
2. (Netherlands) Thijs Boogaard

=== Qualifying draw ===
==== First qualifier ====
First round
1	(Serbia) Hamad Medjedovic	6	6
(Georgia (country)) Nikoloz Basilashvili	3	4
(France) Luka Pavlovic	6	6
8	(United Kingdom) Billy Harris	4	3

Qualifying competition
1	(Serbia) Hamad Medjedovic	6^{5}	6	6^{8}
(France) Luka Pavlovic	7^{7}	3	7^{10}

==== Second qualifier ====
First round
Alt	(Belgium) Kimmer Coppejans	6	6^{6}	2
WC	(Netherlands) Thijs Boogaard	3	7^{8}	6
(France) Hugo Grenier	7	6
7	(United Kingdom) Jan Choinski	5	2

Qualifying competition
WC	(Netherlands) Thijs Boogaard	6	6^{3}	4
(France) Hugo Grenier	2	7^{7}	6

==== Third qualifier ====
First round
3	(France) Hugo Gaston	6	6^{2}	7^{7}
WC	(Netherlands) Alec Deckers	3	7^{7}	6^{2}
(Ukraine) Vitaliy Sachko	3	5
6	(Australia) Christopher O'Connell	6	7

Qualifying competition
3	(France) Hugo Gaston	2	3
6	(Australia) Christopher O'Connell	6	6

==== Fourth qualifier ====
First round
4	(Spain) Pablo Carreño Busta	4	6	1
(Spain) Roberto Carballés Baena	6	3	6
WC	(Netherlands) Mees Röttgering	0	6	6
5	(France) Kyrian Jacquet	6	4	4

Qualifying competition
(Spain) Roberto Carballés Baena	6^{3}	7^{10}	3
WC	(Netherlands) Mees Röttgering	7^{7}	6^{8}	6
