= Mo Yecong =

Chinese tennis player

- Country (sports): China
- Born: 26 June 2000 (age 25) Shaodong, China
- Height: 1.83 m (6 ft 0 in)
- Plays: Right-handed (two-handed backhand)
- Prize money: $52,186

Singles
- Career record: 0–1 (at ATP Tour level, Grand Slam level, and in Davis Cup)
- Career titles: 1 ITF
- Highest ranking: No. 545 (10 June 2024)
- Current ranking: No. 582 (16 September 2024)

Doubles
- Career record: 1–1 (at ATP Tour level, Grand Slam level, and in Davis Cup)
- Career titles: 0
- Highest ranking: No. 914 (25 September 2023)
- Current ranking: No. 1194 (16 September 2024)
- Last updated on: 20 September 2024.

Mo Yecong (born 26 June 2000) is a Chinese tennis player.

Mo has a career high ATP singles ranking of 545 achieved on 10 June 2024. He also has a career high ATP doubles ranking of 914 achieved on 25 September 2023.

Mo made his ATP main draw debut at the 2023 Zhuhai Championships after receiving wildcards into the singles and doubles main draws. He also made an appearance at the 2024 Chengdu Open with a wildcard into the doubles main draw, where he recorded his first ATP-level win.
