= Sander Gillé =

Belgian tennis player

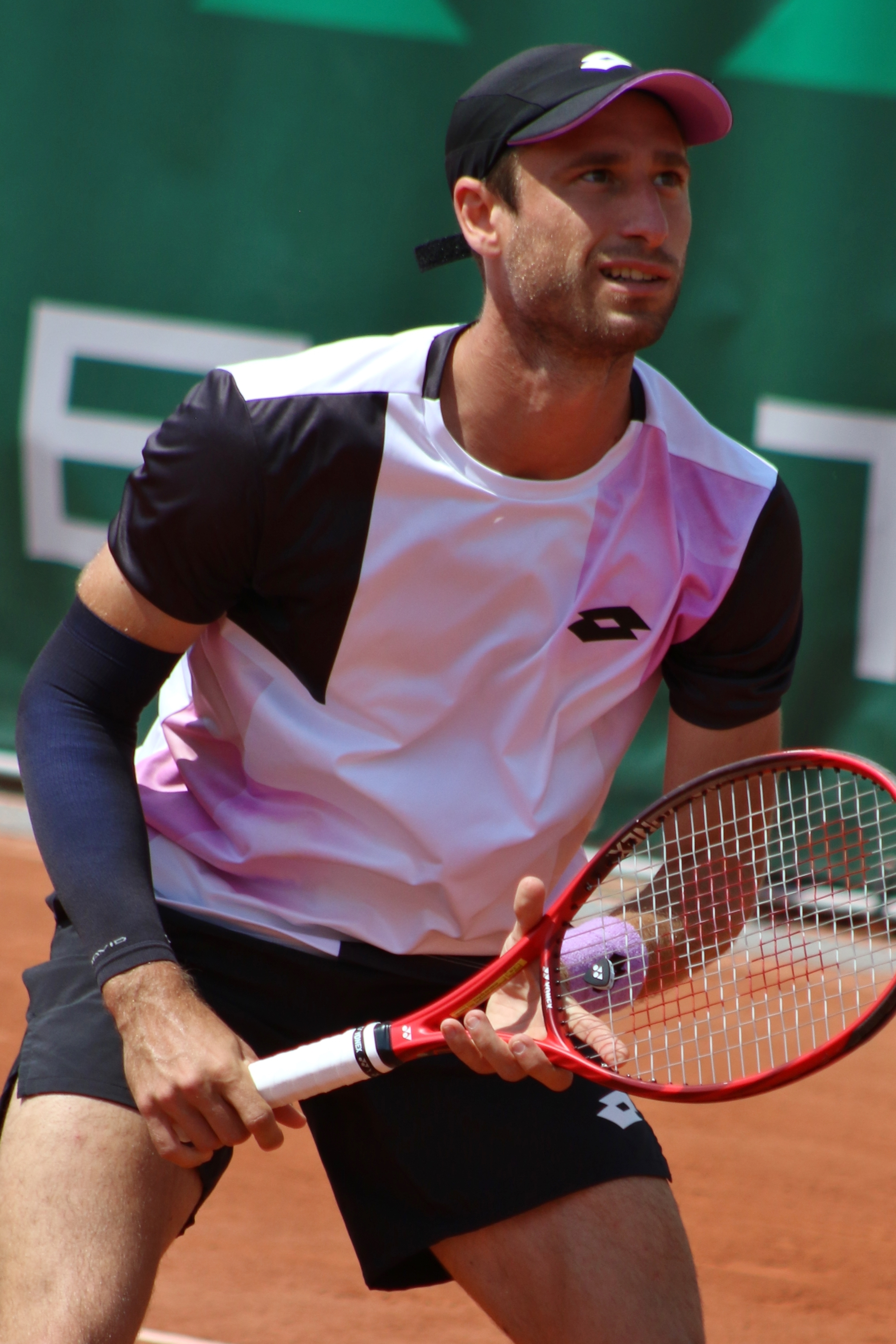
- Gillé at the 2021 French Open
- Country (sports): Belgium
- Residence: Hasselt, Belgium
- Born: 15 January 1991 (age 35) Hasselt
- Height: 6 ft 1 in (185 cm)
- Turned pro: 2013
- Plays: Right-handed (one-handed backhand)
- College: ETSU
- Prize money: $ 1,939,941

Singles
- Career record: 0–0
- Career titles: 0
- Highest ranking: No. 574 (24 December 2018)

Doubles
- Career record: 162 - 166
- Career titles: 8
- Highest ranking: No. 18 (25 September 2023)
- Current ranking: No. 56 (27 October 2025)

Grand Slam doubles results
- Australian Open: 3R (2025)
- French Open: F (2023)
- Wimbledon: 3R (2023, 2026)
- US Open: QF (2020)

Other doubles tournaments
- Olympic Games: 1R (2021, 2024)

Grand Slam mixed doubles results
- Australian Open: QF (2021, 2024)
- French Open: 2R (2022)
- Wimbledon: 3R (2021)
- US Open: QF (2021, 2024)

Team competitions
- Davis Cup: 1–1
- Last updated on: 27 October 2025.

Sander Gillé (born 15 January 1991) is a Belgian professional tennis player who specializes in doubles. He has a career-high doubles ranking of World No. 18 by the ATP, achieved on 25 September 2023. He also has a career-high singles ranking of World No. 574, reached on 24 December 2018. Gillé has won eight ATP Tour doubles titles with partner Joran Vliegen, including an ATP Masters 1000 title at the 2024 Monte-Carlo Masters.

== Career ==
=== 2019: Three ATP doubles titles ===
Gillé won his first ATP Tour doubles title at the 2019 Swedish Open with fellow Belgian Joran Vliegen. A week later, they won their second title at Gstaad. In the next week, their 11-match winning streak was ended in the final of Kitzbühel. Two months later, Gillé and Vliegen picked up their third title of 2019 at the Zhuhai Championships.

=== 2020–2021: Two ATP doubles titles, first Major quarterfinal, Masters semifinal, top 25 ===
Gillé won two more titles with his partner Jordan Vliegen at the 2020 Astana Open and at the 2021 Singapore Open. They also reached the quarterfinals at the 2020 US Open (tennis) losing to the eventual runners-up Mektic/Koolhof, their best showing as a pair at a Grand Slam thus far.

The pair made their first Masters 1000 semifinal at the 2021 Madrid Open, losing to the second-seeded pair of Pavic/Mektic. As a result, Gillé reached a career-high of No. 33 on 10 May 2021.

=== 2023: First Grand Slam doubles final, top 20 debut ===
At the 2023 French Open, Gillé having never get passed the third round at this Major, partnering Vliegen as an unseeded pair, they reached their first Major final defeating fourth seeds Croatians Nikola Mektić/Mate Pavić, Roman Jebavý/Luis David Martínez, ninth seeds Santiago González/Édouard Roger-Vasselin, 14th seed Argentines Andrés Molteni/Máximo González and 12th seeds Andreas Mies/Matwé Middelkoop. In the final, they lost to Ivan Dodig and Austin Krajicek in straight sets. He made his top 20 debut on 7 August 2023.

=== 2024–2025: Masters title, new partnership with Zieliński ===
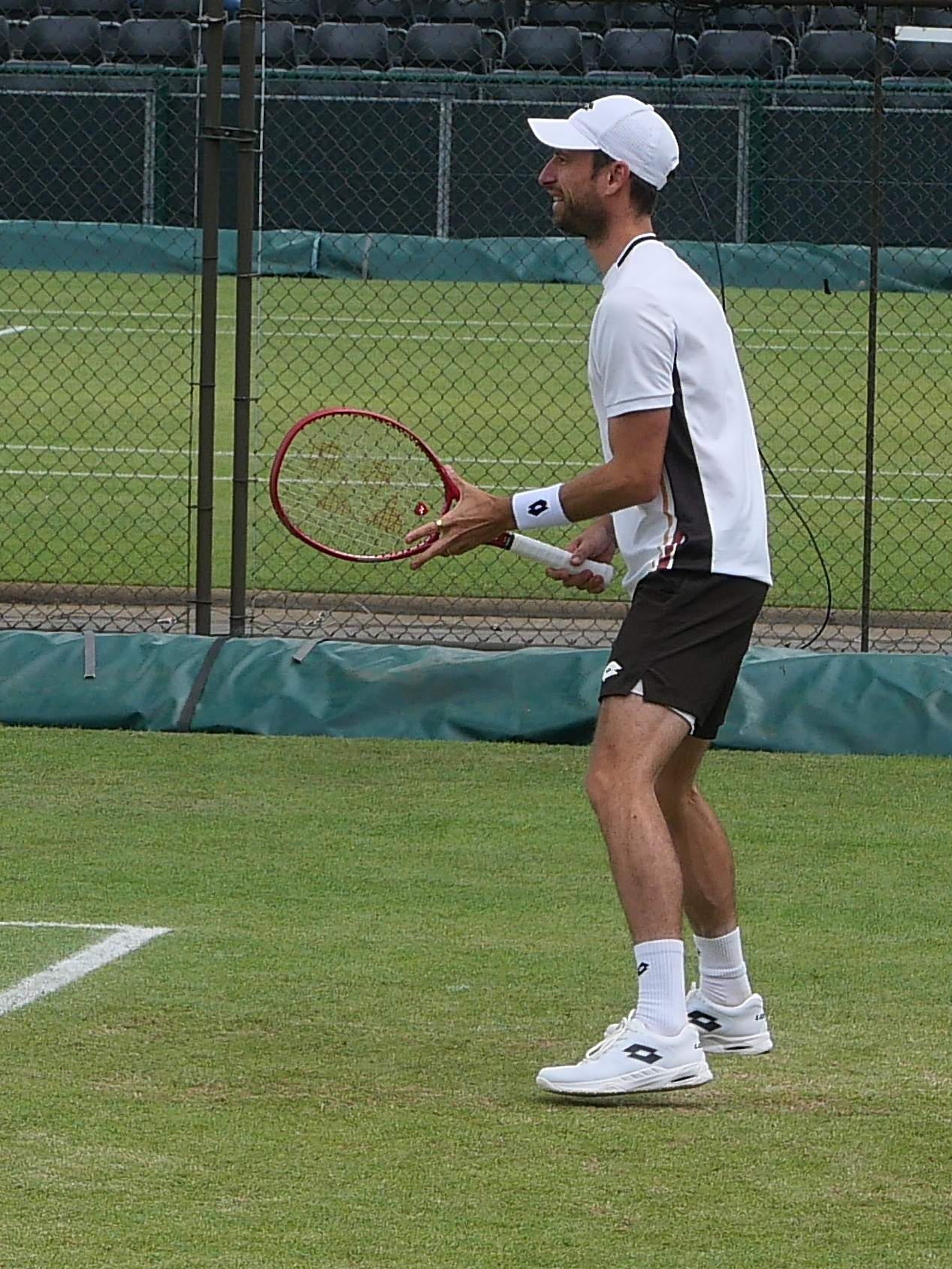
Sander Gillé at the 2026 Libéma Open

At the 2024 Monte-Carlo Masters with Vliegen, they defeated wildcard pair of Jannik Sinner and Lorenzo Sonego, defending champions and second seeds Austin Krajicek and Ivan Dodig in the second round, and sixth seeds Tim Pütz and Kevin Krawietz to reach the semifinals. They reached their first Masters 1000 final upsetting third seeds Horacio Zeballos and Marcel Granollers. They won their first Masters title defeating alternate pair of Alexander Zverev and Marcelo Melo. They became just the second and third Belgians to win a Masters 1000 doubles title after Xavier Malisse won in Indian Wells in 2010.

== Significant finals ==
=== Grand Slam finals ===
==== Doubles: 1 (runner-up) ====
Result	Year	Tournament	Surface	Partner	Opponents	Score
Loss	2023	French Open	Clay	(Belgium) Joran Vliegen	(Croatia) Ivan Dodig (United States) Austin Krajicek	3–6, 1–6

=== Masters 1000 finals ===
==== Doubles: 1 (title) ====
Outcome	Year	Championship	Surface	Partner	Opponents	Score
Win	2024	Monte Carlo	Clay	(Belgium) Joran Vliegen	(Brazil) Marcelo Melo (Germany) Alexander Zverev	5–7, 6–3, [10–5]

== ATP career finals ==
=== Doubles: 15 (8 titles, 7 runner-ups) ===
Legend Grand Slam tournaments (0–1) ATP World Tour Finals (0–0) ATP World Tour Masters 1000 (1–0) ATP World Tour 500 Series (0–2) ATP World Tour 250 Series (7–4)	Finals by surface Hard (4–3) Clay (4–4) Grass (0–0)	Finals by setting Outdoor (6–5) Indoor (2–2)

Result	W–L	Date	Tournament	Tier	Surface	Partner	Opponents	Score
Win	1–0	Jul 2019	Swedish Open	250 Series	Clay	(Belgium) Joran Vliegen	(Argentina) Federico Delbonis (Argentina) Horacio Zeballos	6–7^{(5–7)}, 7–5, [10–5]
Win	2–0	Jul 2019	Swiss Open	250 Series	Clay	(Belgium) Joran Vliegen	(Austria) Philipp Oswald (Slovakia) Filip Polášek	6–4, 6–3
Loss	2–1	Aug 2019	Austrian Open	250 Series	Clay	(Belgium) Joran Vliegen	(Austria) Philipp Oswald (Slovakia) Filip Polášek	4–6, 4–6
Win	3–1	Sep 2019	Zhuhai Championships, China	250 Series	Hard	(Belgium) Joran Vliegen	(Brazil) Marcelo Demoliner (Netherlands) Matwé Middelkoop	7–6^{(7–2)}, 7–6^{(7–4)}
Win	4–1	Nov 2020	Astana Open, Kazakhstan	250 Series	Hard (i)	(Belgium) Joran Vliegen	(Australia) Max Purcell (Australia) Luke Saville	7–5, 6–3
Win	5–1	Feb 2021	Singapore Open	250 Series	Hard (i)	(Belgium) Joran Vliegen	(Australia) Matthew Ebden (Australia) John-Patrick Smith	6–2, 6–3
Loss	5–2	May 2021	Bavarian Championships, Germany	250 Series	Clay	(Belgium) Joran Vliegen	(Netherlands) Wesley Koolhof (Germany) Kevin Krawietz	6–4, 4–6, [5–10]
Win	6–2	Jan 2023	Maharashtra Open, India	250 Series	Hard	(Belgium) Joran Vliegen	(India) Sriram Balaji (India) Jeevan Nedunchezhiyan	6–4, 6–4
Win	7–2	Apr 2023	Estoril Open, Portugal	250 Series	Clay	(Belgium) Joran Vliegen	(Serbia) Nikola Ćaćić (Serbia) Miomir Kecmanović	6–3, 6–4
Loss	7–3	Jun 2023	French Open, France	Grand Slam	Clay	(Belgium) Joran Vliegen	(Croatia) Ivan Dodig (United States) Austin Krajicek	3–6, 1–6
Loss	7–4	Jul 2023	Hamburg European Open, Germany	500 Series	Clay	(Belgium) Joran Vliegen	(Germany) Kevin Krawietz (Germany) Tim Pütz	6–7^{(4–7)}, 3–6
Loss	7–5	Jan 2024	Hong Kong Open, Hong Kong	250 Series	Hard	(Belgium) Joran Vliegen	(El Salvador) Marcelo Arévalo (Croatia) Mate Pavić	6–7^{(3–7)}, 4–6
Win	8–5	Apr 2024	Monte-Carlo Masters, Monaco	Masters 1000	Clay	(Belgium) Joran Vliegen	(Brazil) Marcelo Melo (Germany) Alexander Zverev	5–7, 6–3, [10–5]
Loss	8–6	Feb 2025	Rotterdam Open, Netherlands	ATP 500	Hard (i)	(Poland) Jan Zieliński	(Italy) Simone Bolelli (Italy) Andrea Vavassori	2–6, 6–4, [6–10]
Loss	8–7	Feb 2025	Open 13, France	ATP 250	Hard (i)	(Poland) Jan Zieliński	(France) Benjamin Bonzi (France) Pierre-Hugues Herbert	3–6, 4–6

== Challenger and Futures finals ==
=== Singles: 2 (1–1) ===
Legend ATP Challenger Tour (0–0) ITF Futures Tour (1–1)	Finals by surface Hard (0–1) Clay (1–0)

Result	W–L	Date	Tournament	Tier	Surface	Opponent	Score
Loss	0–1	Nov 2015	Norway F3, Oslo	Futures	Hard (i)	(Sweden) Carl Söderlund	4–6, 2–6
Win	1–1	May 2016	Ukraine F1, Cherkasy	Futures	Clay	(Ukraine) Vladyslav Manafov	6–4, 3–6, 6–4

=== Doubles: 69 (46–23) ===
Legend ATP Challenger Tour (20–9) ITF Futures Tour (26–14)	Finals by surface Hard (16–7) Clay (29–16) Grass (0–0) Carpet (1–0)

Result	W–L	Date	Tournament	Tier	Surface	Partner	Opponents	Score
Loss	0–1	Aug 2011	Belgium F9, Jupille-sur-Meuse	Futures	Clay	(Belgium) Marco Dierckx	(Chile) Guillermo Hormazábal (Chile) Rodrigo Pérez	4–6, 6–7^{(2–7)}
Loss	0–2	Mar 2013	Great Britain F6, Shrewsbury	Futures	Hard (i)	(Belgium) Jonas Merckx	(United Kingdom) David Rice (United Kingdom) Sean Thornley	2–6, 1–6
Win	1–2	Jul 2013	Belgium F4, Knokke	Futures	Clay	(Belgium) Maxime Braeckman	(Belgium) Joris De Loore (Chile) Juan Carlos Sáez	6–2, 5–7, [10–6]
Loss	1–3	Aug 2013	Belgium F7, Ostend	Futures	Clay	(Spain) Roger Ordeig	(Belgium) Kimmer Coppejans (Belgium) Niels Desein	2–6, 3–6
Win	2–3	Aug 2013	Belgium F8, Eupen	Futures	Clay	(Belgium) Joran Vliegen	(Argentina) Gustavo Gómez Buyatti (France) Antoine Hoang	6–3, 6–3
Win	3–3	Nov 2013	Cyprus F2, Nicosia	Futures	Hard	(France) Matthieu Roy	(Italy) Erik Crepaldi (Portugal) André Gaspar Murta	6–1, 6–3
Loss	3–4	Jun 2014	Israel F9, Tel Aviv	Futures	Hard	(Greece) Alexandros Jakupovic	(United States) Peter Kobelt (United States) Devin McCarthy	2–6, 7–6^{(7–3)}, [4–10]
Win	4–4	Jul 2014	Belgium F8, Heist	Futures	Clay	(Belgium) Julien Cagnina	(Russia) Evgeny Karlovskiy (Germany) Tom Schönenberg	6–4, 7–5
Loss	4–5	Aug 2014	Belgium F9, Ostend	Futures	Clay	(France) Antoine Hoang	(Netherlands) Scott Griekspoor (Netherlands) Alban Meuffels	2–6, 4–6
Win	5–5	Aug 2014	Belgium F11, Koksijde	Futures	Clay	(Belgium) Joran Vliegen	(Australia) Jake Eames (Spain) David Pérez Sanz	3–6, 6–3, [12–10]
Loss	5–6	Sep 2014	Tunisia F4, Carthage	Futures	Clay	(Greece) Alexandros Jakupovic	(Italy) Claudio Grassi (Italy) Stefano Travaglia	2–6, 3–6
Loss	5–7	Nov 2014	Greece F11, Heraklion	Futures	Clay	(France) Alexis Musialek	(Greece) Alexandros Jakupovic (Russia) Markos Kalovelonis	6–7^{(1–7)}, 6–7^{(4–7)}
Win	6–7	Dec 2014	Egypt F35, Sharm El Sheikh	Futures	Hard	(Belgium) Germain Gigounon	(Austria) Pascal Brunner (Slovenia) Janez Semrajc	1–6, 6–1, [10–8]
Loss	6–8	Feb 2015	Sri Lanka F2, Colombo	Futures	Clay	(Chinese Taipei) Huang Liang-chi	(Czech Republic) Libor Salaba (Czech Republic) Jan Šátral	2–6, 6–4, [9–11]
Win	7–8	Jun 2015	Belgium F2, Damme	Futures	Clay	(Belgium) Joran Vliegen	(France) Antoine Hoang (Luxembourg) Ugo Nastasi	6–2, 6–3
Loss	7–9	Jun 2015	Belgium F3, Havré	Futures	Clay	(Belgium) Joran Vliegen	(United States) Deiton Baughman (Brazil) Fabrício Neis	6–2, 4–6, [2–10]
Win	8–9	Jul 2015	Belgium F7, Duinbergen	Futures	Clay	(Belgium) Joran Vliegen	(Belgium) Julien Cagnina (Belgium) Jonas Merckx	6–7^{(5–7)}, 6–4, [10–6]
Loss	8–10	Aug 2015	Belgium F8, Middelkerke	Futures	Hard	(Belgium) Joran Vliegen	(Netherlands) Sander Arends (Uruguay) Ariel Behar	7–6^{(7–1)}, 4–6, [7–10]
Loss	8–11	Aug 2015	Belgium F9, Eupen	Futures	Clay	(Belgium) Joran Vliegen	(United Kingdom) Billy Harris (United Kingdom) Evan Hoyt	6–7^{(5–7)}, 3–6
Win	9–11	Aug 2015	Belgium F10, Koksijde	Futures	Clay	(Belgium) Joran Vliegen	(United Kingdom) Evan Hoyt (United Kingdom) Toby Martin	6–2, 6–1
Win	10–11	Aug 2015	Belgium F11, Jupille-sur-Meuse	Futures	Clay	(Belgium) Joran Vliegen	(United Kingdom) Evan Hoyt (United Kingdom) Toby Martin	6–1, 6–4
Win	11–11	Oct 2015	Norway F2, Oslo	Futures	Hard (i)	(Belgium) Joran Vliegen	(Croatia) Ivan Sabanov (Croatia) Matej Sabanov	6–7^{(4–7)}, 7–6^{(7–5)}, [10–8]
Win	12–11	Nov 2015	Norway F3, Oslo	Futures	Hard (i)	(Belgium) Joran Vliegen	(Croatia) Ivan Sabanov (Croatia) Matej Sabanov	7–6^{(7–3)}, 6–1
Win	13–11	Dec 2015	Israel F17, Ramat Gan	Futures	Hard	(Belgium) Michael Geerts	(Israel) Yannai Barkai (Israel) Daniel Dudockin	6–2, 6–1
Win	14–11	Dec 2015	Israel F18, Ramat Gan	Futures	Hard	(Belgium) Julien Dubail	(Romania) George Botezan (Israel) Mor Bulis	6–3, 4–6, [10–4]
Win	15–11	Jan 2016	France F2, Bressuire	Futures	Hard (i)	(Belgium) Joran Vliegen	(France) Benjamin Bonzi (France) Grégoire Jacq	7–6^{(7–1)}, 7–5
Win	16–11	Jan 2016	France F3, Veigy-Foncenex	Futures	Carpet (i)	(Belgium) Joran Vliegen	(United Kingdom) Scott Clayton (United Kingdom) Richard Gabb	6–7^{(4–7)}, 7–6^{(8–6)}, [10–7]
Loss	16–12	Mar 2016	Egypt F7, Sharm El Sheikh	Futures	Hard	(Belgium) Joran Vliegen	(Czech Republic) Dominik Kellovský (Czech Republic) Jaroslav Pospíšil	6–3, 3–6, [11–13]
Win	17–12	Mar 2016	Egypt F8, Sharm El Sheikh	Futures	Hard	(Belgium) Joran Vliegen	(Germany) Tom Schönenberg (Germany) Matthias Wunner	6–3, 7–6^{(7–2)}
Win	18–12	Apr 2016	Uzbekistan F2, Bukhara	Futures	Hard	(Belgium) Joran Vliegen	(Russia) Evgeny Elistratov (Russia) Vitaly Kozyukov	6–4, 6–3
Win	19–12	May 2016	Ukraine F1, Cherkasy	Futures	Clay	(Belgium) Joran Vliegen	(Switzerland) Antoine Bellier (Ukraine) Vladyslav Manafov	6–3, 4–6, [11–9]
Win	20–12	Jun 2016	Belgium F2, Havré	Futures	Clay	(Belgium) Joran Vliegen	(Australia) Adam Taylor (Australia) Jason Taylor	6–2, 6–4
Win	21–12	Jul 2016	Belgium F3, Nieuwpoort	Futures	Clay	(Belgium) Joran Vliegen	(Belgium) Stijn Meulemans (Belgium) Laurens Verboven	6–2, 6–3
Win	22–12	Jul 2016	Belgium F6, Knokke	Futures	Clay	(Belgium) Joran Vliegen	(United States) Hunter Johnson (United States) Yates Johnson	6–4, 6–4
Win	23–12	Jul 2016	Belgium F7, Duinbergen	Futures	Clay	(Belgium) Joran Vliegen	(Belgium) Michael Geerts (Belgium) Jeroen Vanneste	6–7^{(4–7)}, 6–3, [10–4]
Win	24–12	Aug 2016	Morocco F5, Tangier	Futures	Clay	(France) Antoine Hoang	(France) Gianni Mina (France) Alexandre Müller	6–4, 7–6^{(9–7)}
Win	25–12	Aug 2016	Trnava, Slovakia	Challenger	Clay	(Belgium) Joran Vliegen	(Poland) Tomasz Bednarek (Czech Republic) Roman Jebavý	6–2, 7–5
Loss	25–13	Aug 2016	Meerbusch, Germany	Challenger	Clay	(Belgium) Joran Vliegen	(Russia) Mikhail Elgin (Belarus) Andrei Vasilevski	6–7^{(6–8)}, 4–6
Loss	25–14	Aug 2016	Belgium F11, Huy	Futures	Clay	(Belgium) Joran Vliegen	(United Kingdom) Jarryd Bant (United Kingdom) Tom Farquharson	3–6, 2–6
Loss	25–15	Mar 2017	Turkey F10, Antalya	Futures	Clay	(Belgium) Joran Vliegen	(Turkey) Tuna Altuna (Turkey) Cem İlkel	6–0, 2–6, [8–10]
Win	26–15	May 2017	Italy F12, Naples	Futures	Clay	(Belgium) Joran Vliegen	(Netherlands) Antal van der Duim (Netherlands) Boy Westerhof	6–4, 6–2
Win	27–15	May 2017	Romania F1, Bucharest	Futures	Clay	(Belgium) Joran Vliegen	(Romania) Andrei Ștefan Apostol (Romania) Nicolae Frunză	7–6^{(7–5)}, 6–2
Win	28–15	Jun 2017	Lyon, France	Challenger	Clay	(Belgium) Joran Vliegen	(Germany) Gero Kretschmer (Germany) Alexander Satschko	6–7^{(2–7)}, 7–6^{(7–2)}, [14–12]
Win	29–15	Jun 2017	Blois, France	Challenger	Clay	(Belgium) Joran Vliegen	(Argentina) Máximo González (Brazil) Fabrício Neis	3–6, 6–3, [10–7]
Win	30–15	Jul 2017	Scheveningen, Netherlands	Challenger	Clay	(Belgium) Joran Vliegen	(Slovakia) Jozef Kovalík (Greece) Stefanos Tsitsipas	6–2, 4–6, [12–10]
Win	31–15	Jul 2017	Tampere, Finland	Challenger	Clay	(Belgium) Joran Vliegen	(Mexico) Lucas Gómez (Argentina) Juan Ignacio Londero	6–2, 6–7^{(5–7)}, [10–3]
Loss	31–16	Sep 2017	Sibiu, Romania	Challenger	Clay	(Belgium) Joran Vliegen	(Italy) Marco Cecchinato (Italy) Matteo Donati	3–6, 1–6
Loss	31–17	Sep 2017	Rome, Italy	Challenger	Clay	(Belgium) Joran Vliegen	(Slovakia) Martin Kližan (Slovakia) Jozef Kovalík	3–6, 6–7^{(5–7)}
Win	32–17	Nov 2017	Brescia, Italy	Challenger	Hard (i)	(Netherlands) Sander Arends	(Switzerland) Luca Margaroli (Austria) Tristan-Samuel Weissborn	6–2, 6–3
Loss	32–18	Nov 2017	Andria, Italy	Challenger	Hard (i)	(Netherlands) Sander Arends	(Italy) Lorenzo Sonego (Italy) Andrea Vavassori	3–6, 6–3, [7–10]
Win	33–18	Jan 2018	Rennes, France	Challenger	Hard (i)	(Belgium) Joran Vliegen	(Netherlands) Sander Arends (Croatia) Antonio Šančić	6–3, 6–7^{(1–7)}, [10–7]
Loss	33–19	Feb 2018	Quimper, France	Challenger	Hard (i)	(Belgium) Joran Vliegen	(United Kingdom) Ken Skupski (United Kingdom) Neal Skupski	3–6, 6–3, [7–10]
Loss	33–20	May 2018	Rome, Italy	Challenger	Clay	(Belgium) Joran Vliegen	(Germany) Kevin Krawietz (Germany) Andreas Mies	3–6, 6–2, [4–10]
Win	34–20	Jul 2018	Prague, Czech Republic	Challenger	Clay	(Belgium) Joran Vliegen	(Brazil) Fernando Romboli (Spain) David Vega Hernández	6–4, 6–2
Win	35–20	Aug 2018	Liberec, Czech Republic	Challenger	Clay	(Belgium) Joran Vliegen	(Slovakia) Filip Polášek (Czech Republic) Patrik Rikl	6–3, 6–4
Win	36–20	Aug 2018	Pullach, Germany	Challenger	Clay	(Belgium) Joran Vliegen	(Italy) Daniele Bracciali (Italy) Simone Bolelli	6–2, 6–2
Win	37–20	Oct 2018	Ortisei, Italy	Challenger	Hard (i)	(Belgium) Joran Vliegen	(India) Purav Raja (Croatia) Antonio Šančić	3–6, 6–3, [10–3]
Win	38–20	Oct 2018	Brest, France	Challenger	Hard (i)	(Belgium) Joran Vliegen	(India) Leander Paes (Mexico) Miguel Ángel Reyes-Varela	3–6, 6–4, [10–2]
Win	39–20	Nov 2018	Mouilleron-le-Captif, France	Challenger	Hard (i)	(Belgium) Joran Vliegen	(Monaco) Romain Arneodo (France) Quentin Halys	6–3, 4–6, [10–2]
Loss	39–21	Jan 2019	Punta del Este, Uruguay	Challenger	Clay	(Belgium) Joran Vliegen	(Argentina) Guido Andreozzi (Argentina) Guillermo Durán	2–6, 7–6^{(8–6)}, [8–10]
Loss	39–22	Mar 2019	Marbella, Spain	Challenger	Clay	(Belgium) Joran Vliegen	(Germany) Kevin Krawietz (Germany) Andreas Mies	6–7^{(6–8)}, 6–2, [6–10]
Win	40–22	Jun 2019	Bratislava, Slovakia	Challenger	Clay	(Belgium) Joran Vliegen	(Slovakia) Lukáš Klein (Slovakia) Alex Molčan	6–2, 7–5
Loss	40-23	Sep 2019	New Haven, USA	Challenger	Hard	(Belgium) Joran Vliegen	(United States) Nathaniel Lammons (United States) Robert Galloway	5–7, 4–6
Win	41–23	Sep 2025	Villena, Spain	Challenger	Hard	(Netherlands) Sem Verbeek	(Czech Republic) Petr Nouza (Czech Republic) Patrik Rikl	6–3, 6–4
Win	42–23	Oct 2025	Brest, France	Challenger	Hard (i)	(Netherlands) Sem Verbeek	(France) Théo Arribagé (France) Albano Olivetti	7–6^{(7–5)}, 7–6^{(7–4)}
Win	43–23	Oct 2025	Bratislava, Slovakia	Challenger	Hard (i)	(Netherlands) Sem Verbeek	(United Kingdom) Joshua Paris (United Kingdom) Marcus Willis	7–6^{(7–3)}, 6–3
Win	44–23	Apr 2026	Monza, Italy	Challenger	Clay	(Netherlands) Sem Verbeek	(Switzerland) Jakub Paul (Czech Republic) Matěj Vocel	4–6, 7–6^{(7–3)}, [10–8]
Win	45–23	Apr 2026	Cagliari, Italy	Challenger	Clay	(Netherlands) Sem Verbeek	(Czech Republic) Petr Nouza (Austria) Neil Oberleitner	4–6, 6–3, [10–4]
Win	46–23	June 2026	Perugia, Italy	Challenger	Clay	(Netherlands) Sem Verbeek	(United States) Ryan Seggerman (United States) Theodore Winegar	7–6^{(7–3)}, 4–6, [10–6]

== Performance timelines ==
Key
W	F	SF	QF	#R	RR	Q#	DNQ	A	NH

(W) winner; (F) finalist; (SF) semifinalist; (QF) quarterfinalist; (#R) rounds 4, 3, 2, 1; (RR) round-robin stage; (Q#) qualification round; (DNQ) did not qualify; (A) absent; (NH) not held; (SR) strike rate (events won / competed); (W–L) win–loss record.
To avoid confusion and double counting, these charts are updated at the conclusion of a tournament or when the player's participation has ended.

=== Doubles ===
Current through the 2025 Hellenic Championship.

Tournament	2017	2018	2019	2020	2021	2022	2023	2024	2025	SR	W–L	Win %
Grand Slam tournaments
Australian Open	A	A	A	2R	1R	1R	1R	1R	3R	0 / 6	3–6	33%
French Open	A	A	A	1R	3R	3R	F	QF	1R	0 / 6	11–6	65%
Wimbledon	A	Q2	2R	NH	1R	A	3R	2R	1R	0 / 5	4–5	44%
US Open	A	A	1R	QF	2R	1R	1R	2R	A	0 / 6	4–6	40%
Win–loss	0–0	0–0	1–2	3–3	3–4	2–3	7–4	4–4	2–3	0 / 23	22–23	49%
ATP Masters 1000 tournaments
Indian Wells Masters	A	A	A	NH	2R	1R	A	2R	1R	0 / 4	2–4	33%
Miami Open	A	A	A	NH	1R	1R	A	1R	2R	0 / 4	1–4	20%
Monte-Carlo Masters	A	A	A	NH	1R	1R	A	W	1R	1 / 4	5–3	63%
Madrid Open	A	A	A	NH	SF	A	A	2R	QF	0 / 3	5–3	63%
Rome Masters	A	A	A	2R	1R	1R	A	QF	2R	0 / 5	4–5	44%
Canadian Open	A	A	A	NH	SF	A	2R	1R	A	0 / 3	4–3	57%
Cincinnati Masters	A	A	A	1R	1R	A	1R	1R	A	0 / 4	0–4	0%
Shanghai Masters	A	A	A	NH			1R	2R	A	0 / 2	1–2	33%
Paris Masters	A	A	1R	2R	QF	2R	A	1R	A	0 / 5	4–5	44%
Win–loss	0–0	0–0	0–1	2–3	8–8	1–5	1–3	10–8	4–5	1 / 34	26–33	44%
Career statistics
Tournaments	1	4	15	15	25	32	25	28	24	Career total: 169		
Titles	0	0	3	1	1	0	2	1	0	Career total: 8		
Finals	0	0	4	1	2	0	4	2	2	Career total: 15		
Overall win–loss	0–1	1–5	28–13	16–16	24–23	15–32	32–24	27–28	21–25	8 / 169	164–167	50%
Year-end ranking	114	82	47	40	24	61	25	31	49	$1,952,551		

=== Mixed doubles ===
This table is current through the 2025 French Open.

Tournament	2021	2022	2023	2024	2025	SR	W–L	Win %
Australian Open	QF	1R	A	QF	1R	0 / 4	4–4	50%
French Open	1R	2R	A	1R	1R	0 / 4	1–4	20%
Wimbledon	3R	A	1R	1R	A	0 / 3	1–3	25%
US Open	QF	A	1R	QF (Note: Withdraw during the tournament. Not counted as a loss.)	A	0 / 3	3–2	60%
Win–loss	4–4	1–2	0–2	4–3	0–2	0 / 14	9–13	41%

== Davis Cup ==
=== Participations: (1–1) ===
Group membership World Group (0–1) Qualifying Round (1–0) WG Play-off (0–0) Group I (0–0)	Matches by surface Hard (0–1) Clay (1–0) Grass (0–0) Carpet (0–0)	Matches by type Singles (0–0) Doubles (1–1)

- ▲ ▼ indicates the outcome of the Davis Cup match followed by the score, date, place of event, the zonal classification and its phase, and the court surface.

Rubber outcome	No.	Rubber	Match type (partner if any)	Opponent nation	Opponent player(s)	Score
▼0–4; 6–8 April 2018; Curb Event Center, Nashville, United States; World Group Quarterfinal; hard surface
Defeat	1	III	Doubles (with Joran Vliegen)	United States	Ryan Harrison / Jack Sock	7–5, 6–7^{(1–7)}, 6–7^{(3–7)}, 4–6
▲3–1; 1–2 February 2019; Ginásio Municipal Tancredo Neves, Uberlândia, Brazil; Davis Cup qualifying round; clay (indoor) surface
Victory	2	III	Doubles (with Joran Vliegen)	Brazil	Marcelo Melo / Bruno Soares	6–4, 7–6^{(7–4)}
