= Zhuhai Championships =

Defunct tennis tournament
- Founded: 2019; 7 years ago
- Abolished: 2023
- Editions: 2
- Location: Zhuhai; China
- Venue: Hengqin International Tennis Center
- Surface: Hard – outdoors
ATP Tour
- Category: ATP Tour 250
- Draw: 28S / 16Q / 16D
- Prize money: US$1,000,000 (2019)

Zhuhai Championships
- Simplified Chinese: 珠海网球冠军赛
- Traditional Chinese: 珠海網球冠軍賽
Transcriptions
Standard Mandarin
- Hanyu Pinyin: Zhūhǎi Wǎngqiú Guànjūnsài
Yue: Cantonese
- Jyutping: zyu1 hoi2 mong5 kau4 gun3 gwan1 coi3

The Zhuhai Championships (Chinese: 珠海网球冠军赛) was an ATP 250 series men's tennis tournament. It was played on outdoor hard courts of the Hengqin International Tennis Center in Zhuhai, Guangdong Province, China, which has 17 outdoor courts and a 5,000-seat stadium. In February 2019, ATP and Huafa Group announced Zhuhai to host the event in September. Starting with the 2024 season, the tournament was replaced by the Hangzhou Open.

== Venue ==
The Zhuhai Championships shared the same venue of Hengqin International Tennis Center with the WTA Elite Trophy and the Zhuhai Open.

Venue	Years	Stadium	Surface	Capacity
Zhuhai, China	2019–2023	Hengqin International Tennis Center	Hard	5,000

== Past finals ==
=== Singles ===
Year	Champion	Runner-up	Score
2019	(Australia) Alex de Minaur	(France) Adrian Mannarino	7–6^{(7–4)}, 6–4
2020–2022	Not held due to COVID-19 pandemic		
2023	Karen Khachanov	(Japan) Yoshihito Nishioka	7–6^{(7–2)}, 6–1

=== Doubles ===
Year	Champions	Runners-up	Score
2019	(Belgium) Sander Gillé (Belgium) Joran Vliegen	(Brazil) Marcelo Demoliner (Netherlands) Matwé Middelkoop	7–6^{(7–2)}, 7–6^{(7–4)}
2020–2022	Not held due to COVID-19 pandemic		
2023	(United Kingdom) Jamie Murray (New Zealand) Michael Venus	(United States) Nathaniel Lammons (United States) Jackson Withrow	6–4, 6–4

== See also ==
- WTA Elite Trophy
- Zhuhai Open
